= List of MPs elected in the 2016 Ghanaian parliamentary election =

Colonial Era
1951 Assembly	(election)
1954 Assembly	(election)
1956 Assembly	(election)
First Republic
1957 Parliament	(election)
1965 Parliament	(election)
Second Republic
1969 Parliament	(election)
Third Republic
1979 Parliament	(election)
Fourth Republic
1st Parliament	(1992)
2nd Parliament	(1996)
3rd Parliament	(2000)
4th Parliament	(2004)
5th Parliament	(2008)
6th Parliament	(2012)
7th Parliament	(2016)
8th Parliament	(2020)
9th Parliament	(2024)

The election of Members of Parliament (MPs) to the 7th Parliament of the Fourth Republic was held on 7 December 2016. The Speaker is not an elected member of parliament though he/she is qualified to stand for election as such. There are a total of 275 constituencies in Ghana. 45 new constituencies were created prior to the 2012 election. The 7th Parliament had its first sitting on Sunday 7 January 2017 shortly after midnight to elect a Speaker and Deputy Speakers as well as for the administration of oaths to the Speaker and Members of Parliament.

== Current composition ==
Results from 275 constituencies are shown in the table below.

Affiliation	Members
New Patriotic Party (NPP)	169
National Democratic Congress (NDC)	106
Total	275
Government Majority	63

== List of MPs elected in the general election ==
Table of contents:

Ahafo Region • Ashanti Region • Bono Region • Bono East region • Central Region • Eastern Region • Greater Accra Region • Northern Region
North East Region • Oti Region • Savannah Region • Upper East Region • Upper West Region • Volta Region • Western Region • Western North Region
Changes • By-elections • Notes and References • See also • External links and sources

=== Ahafo Region - 6 seats ===
Constituency	Elected MP	Elected Party	Majority	Previous MP	Previous Party
Asunafo North	Evans Bobie Opoku	NPP	7,681	Robert Sarfo-Mensah	NPP
Asunafo South	Eric Opoku	NDC	2,527	Eric Opoku	NDC
Asutifi North	Benhazin Joseph Dahah	NPP	2,985	Benhazin Joseph Dahah	NPP
Asutifi South	Collins Dauda	NDC	3,829	Collins Dauda	NDC
Tano North	Freda Prempeh	NPP	6,014	Freda Prempeh	NPP
Tano South	Benjamin Yeboah Sekyere	NPP	3,803	Hanna Louisa Bisiw	NDC
=== Ashanti Region - 47 seats ===
Constituency	Elected MP	Elected Party	Majority	Previous MP	Previous Party
Adansi-Akrofuom	Kwabena Appiah-Pinkrah	NPP	6,845	Kwabena Appiah-Pinkrah	NPP
Adansi-Asokwa	Kobina Tahir Hammond	NPP	4,079	Kobina Tahir Hammond	NPP
Afigya Kwabre North	Nana Amaniampong Marfo	NPP	11,289	Nana Amaniampong Marfo	NPP
Afigya Kwabre South	William Owuraku Aidoo	NPP	39,967	William Owuraku Aidoo	NPP
Afigya Sekyere East	Mavis Nkansah Boadu	NPP	31,553	Hennric David Yeboah	NPP
Ahafo Ano North	Suleman Adamu Sanid	NPP	4,416	Adusei Kwasi	NDC
Ahafo Ano South East	Francis Manu-Adabor	NPP	2,558	Francis Manu-Adabor	NPP
Ahafo Ano South West	Johnson Kweku Adu	NPP	4,775	Johnson Kweku Adu	NPP
Asante-Akim Central	Kwame Anyimadu - Antwi	NPP	19,534	Kwame Anyimadu - Antwi	NPP
Asante-Akim North	Andy Kwame Appiah-Kubi	NPP	12,590	Kwadwo Baah Agyemang	NPP
Asante-Akim South	Kwaku Asante - Boateng	NPP	16,393	Kwaku Asante - Boateng	NPP
Asawase	Muntaka Mohammed Mubarak (Minority Chief Whip)	NDC	5,605	Muntaka Mohammed Mubarak	NDC
Asokwa	Patricia Appiagyei	NPP	45,752	Patricia Appiagyei	NPP
Atwima-Kwanwoma	Kojo Appiah-Kubi	NPP	28,605	Kojo Appiah-Kubi	NPP
Atwima-Mponua	Isaac Kwame Asiamah	NPP	11,273	Isaac Kwame Asiamah	NPP
Atwima-Nwabiagya North	Benito Owusu Bio	NPP	26,969	Benito Owusu Bio	NPP
Atwima-Nwabiagya South	Emmanuel Adjei Anhwere	NPP	38,484	Anthony Osei Boakye	NPP
Bantama	Daniel Okyem Aboagye	NPP	44,373	Henry Kwabena Kokofu	NPP
Bekwai	Joseph Osei-Owusu (First Deputy Speaker)	NPP	42,191	Joseph Osei-Owusu	NPP
Bosome-Freho	Joyce Adwoa Akoh Dei	NPP	10,842	Kwadwo Kyei Frimpong	NPP
Bosomtwe	Yaw Osei Adutwum	NPP	39,023	Simon Osei Mensah	NPP
Effiduase-Asokore	Nana Ayew Afriyie	NPP	21,601	Frank Boakye Agyen	NPP
Ejisu	Kwabena Owusu Aduomi	NPP	45,023	Kwabena Owusu Aduomi	NPP
Ejura-Sekyedumase	Muhammad Bawah Braimah	NDC	1,482	Mohammed Salisu Bamba	NPP
Fomena^{d}	Andrew Amoako Asiamah^{d}	NPP	10,643	Atta Boafo Daniel Kingsley	NPP
Juaben	Ama Pomaa Boateng	NPP	17,585	Ama Pomaa Andoh	NPP
Kumawu	Philip Basoah	NPP	15,895	Philip Basoah	NPP
Kwabre East ^{e}	Francisca Oteng Mensah^{h}	NPP	58,084^{e}	Kofi Frimpong	NPP
Kwadaso^{e}	Samiu Kwadwo Nuamah	NPP	55,368^{e}	Owusu Afriyie Akoto	NPP
Mampong	Kwaku Ampratwum-Sarpong	NPP	26,138	Francis Addai-Nimoh	NPP
Manhyia North	Collins Owusu Amankwah	NPP	25,344	Collins Owusu Amankwah	NPP
Manhyia South	Mathew Opoku Prempeh	NPP	30,915	Mathew Opoku Prempeh	NPP
Manso Edubia	Frimpong Yaw Addo	NPP	16,962	Frimpong Yaw Addo	NPP
Manso Nkwanta	Joseph Albert Quarm	NPP	26,637	Grace Addo	NPP
New Edubease	George Oduro	NPP	4,427	Ernest Kofi Yakah	NDC
Nhyiaeso	Kennedy Kwasi Kankam	NPP	38,137	Richard Winfred Anane	NPP
Nsuta-Kwamang-Beposo	Kwame Asafu-Adjei	NPP	6,410	Kwame Asafu-Adjei	NPP
Obuasi East	Patrick Boakye-Yiadom	NPP	17,111	Edward Michael Ennin	NPP
Obuasi West	Kwaku Agyemang Kwarteng	NPP	20,462	Agyeman Kwaku Kwarteng	NPP
Odotobri	Emmanuel Akwasi Gyamfi	NPP	19,157	Emmanuel Akwasi Gyamfi	NPP
Offinso North	Augustine Collins Ntim	NPP	2,294	Augustine Collins Ntim	NPP
Offinso South	Ben Abdallah Banda	NPP	18,554	Ben Abdallah Banda	NPP
Oforikrom	Emmanuel Marfo	NPP	41,048	Elizabeth Agyeman	NPP
Old Tafo	Anthony Akoto Osei	NPP	32,362	Anthony Akoto Osei	NPP
Sekyere Afram Plains	Alex Adomako-Mensah	NDC	2,095	Alex Adomako-Mensah	NDC
Suame^{e}	Osei Kyei Mensah Bonsu (Majority Leader)	NPP	54,443^{e}	Osei Kyei Mensah Bonsu (Minority leader)	NPP
Subin	Eugene Boakye Antwi	NPP	35,815	Isaac Osei	NPP
=== Bono Region - 12 seats ===
Constituency	Elected MP	Elected Party	Majority	Previous MP	Previous Party
Banda	Ahmed Ibrahim (First Deputy Minority Whip)	NDC	507	Ahmed Ibrahim	NDC
Berekum East	Kwabena Twum-Nuamah	NPP	7,209	Kwabena Twum-Nuamah	NPP
Berekum West	Kwaku Agyenim-Boateng	NPP	2,429	Kwaku Agyenim-Boateng	NPP
Dormaa Central	Kwaku Agyeman-Manu	NPP	2,905	Kwaku Agyeman-Manu	NPP
Dormaa East	William Kwasi Sabi	NPP	6,147	William Kwasi Sabi	NPP
Dormaa West	Ali Maiga Halidu	NPP	291	Vincent Oppong Asamoah	NDC
Jaman North	Siaka Stevens	NPP	1,499	Siaka Stevens	NPP
Jaman South	Yaw Afful	NPP	11,839	Yaw Afful	NPP
Sunyani East	Kwasi Ameyaw-Cheremeh (Majority Chief Whip)	NPP	23,460	Kwasi Ameyaw Cheremeh	NPP
Sunyani West	Ignatius Baffour Awuah	NPP	11,526	Ignatius Baffour Awuah	NPP
Tain^{f}	Gabriel Osei	NPP	41^{f}	Kwasi Agyemang Gyan-Tutu	NDC
Wenchi	George Yaw Gyan-Baffour	NPP	4,017	George Yaw Gyan-Baffuor	NPP
=== Bono East Region - 11 seats ===
Constituency	Elected MP	Elected Party	Majority	Previous MP	Previous Party
Atebubu-Amantin	Kofi Amoakohene	NPP	1,140	Sanja Nanja	NDC
Kintampo North	Kwasi Etu-Bonde	NDC	4,797	Stephen Kunsu	NDC
Kintampo South	Felicia Adjei	NDC	1,056	Yaw Effah-Baafi	NDC
Nkoranza North	Derrick Oduro	NPP	2,253	Derrick Oduro	NPP
Nkoranza South	Charles Konadu-Yiadom	NPP	985	Emmanuel Kwadwo Agyekum	NDC
Pru East	Kwabena Donkor	NDC	4,763	Kwabena Donkor	NDC
Pru West^{f}	Masawud Mohammed	NDC	42^{f}	Masawud Mohammed	NDC
Sene East	Dominic Napare	NDC	5,242	Dominic Napare	NDC
Sene West	Kwame Twumasi Ampofo	NDC	1,482	Kwame Twumasi Ampofo	NDC
Techiman North	Martin Oti Gyarko	NPP	2,940	Alex Kyeremeh	NDC
Techiman South	Henry Yeboah Yiadom-Boachie	NPP	1,573	Adjei Mensah	NDC
=== Central Region - 23 seats ===
Constituency	Elected MP	Elected Party	Majority	Previous MP	Previous Party
Abura-Asebu-Kwamankese	Elvis Morris Donkoh	NPP	1,737	Anthony Christian Dadzie	NDC
Agona East	Queenstar Pokua Sawyerr	NDC	1,276	Queenstar Pokua Sawyerr	NDC
Agona West	Cynthia Mamle Morrison	NPP	9,347	Charles Obeng-Inkoom	NDC
Ajumako-Enyan-Essiam	Cassiel Ato Baah Forson	NDC	3,698	Cassiel Ato Baah Forson	NDC
Asikuma-Odoben-Brakwa	Anthony Effah	NPP	430	Georgina Nkrumah Aboah	NDC
Assin Central	Kennedy Agyapong	NPP	7,361	Ken Ohene Agyapong	NPP
Assin North	Abena Durowaa Mensah	NPP	4,802	Ambre Samuel	NDC
Assin South	John Ntim Fordjuor	NPP	7,625	Dominic Kwaku Fobih	NPP
Awutu-Senya East	Mavis Hawa Koomson	NPP	10,283	Mavis Hawa Koomson	NPP
Awutu-Senya West	George Nenyi Kojo Andah	NPP	3,203	Hanna Serwaa Tetteh	NDC
Cape Coast North	Barbara Asher Ayisi	NPP	3,166	Ebo Barton - Odro (former MP for Cape Coast); First Deputy Speaker	NDC
Cape Coast South	Kweku George Ricketts-Hagan	NDC	738	Kweku George Ricketts-Hagan	NDC
Effutu	Alexander Afenyo-Markin	NPP	10,336	Alexander Afenyo-Markin	NPP
Ekumfi	Francis Kingsley Ato Codjoe	NPP	608	Abeiku Crentsil	NDC
Gomoa Central	Naana Eyiah Quansah	NPP	1,320	Rachel Florence Appoh	NDC
Gomoa East	Kojo Asemanyi	NPP	2,644	Ekow Panyin Okyere Eduamoah	NDC
Gomoa West	Alexandar Kodwo Kom Abban	NPP	1,737	Francis Kojo Arthur	NDC
Hemang Lower Denkyira	Bright Wireko Brobbey	NPP	4,705	Foster Joseph Andoh	NDC
Komenda-Edina-Eguafo-Abirem	Samuel Atta Mills	NDC	3,097	Stephen Nana Ato Arthur	NPP
Mfantseman^{c}	Ekow Hayford^{c}	NPP	726	Aquinas Tawia Quansah	NDC
Twifo-Atii Morkwaa	Abraham Dwuma Oddom	NPP	6,344	Samuel Ato Amoah	NDC
Upper Denkyira East	Nana Amoakoh	NPP	5,915	Nana Amoakoh	NPP
Upper Denkyira West	Samuel Nsowah-Djan	NPP	6,226	Benjamin Kofi Ayeh	NPP
=== Eastern Region - 33 seats ===
Constituency	Elected MP	Elected Party	Majority	Previous MP	Previous Party
Abetifi	Bryan Achemapong	NPP	15,457	Peter Wiafe Pepera	NPP
Abirem	Frimpong John Osei	NPP	6,991	Esther Obeng Dapaah	NPP
Abuakwa North	Gifty Twum Ampofo	NPP	6,084	Gifty Twum Ampofo	NPP
Abuakwa South	Samuel Atta Akyea	NPP	20,752	Samuel Atta Akyea	NPP
Achiase	Robert Kwasi Amoah	NPP	8,320	Robert Kwasi Amoah	NPP
Afram Plains North	Betty Crosby Mensah	NDC	13,326	Emmanuel Aboakye Didieye	NDC
Afram Plains South	Eric Owusu Osei	NDC	2,103	Joseph Appiah Boateng	NDC
Akim Oda	William Agyapong Quaittoo	NPP	14,239	William Agyapong Quaittoo	NPP
Akim Swedru	Kennedy Osei Nyarko	NPP	7,402	Kennedy Osei Nyarko	NPP
Akropong	Nana Ama Dokua Asiamah Adjei	NPP	19,706	William Ofori Boafo	NPP
Akwapim South	Osei Bonsu Amoah	NPP	5,632	Osei Bonsu Amoah	NPP
Akwatia	Mercy Adu-Gyamfi	NPP	5,528	Baba Jamal Mohammed Ahmed	NDC
Asene-Akroso-Manso	George Kwame Aboagye	NPP	11,392	Yaw Owusu-Boateng	NPP
Asuogyaman	Thomas Nyarko Ampem	NDC	1,825	Kofi Osei-Ameyaw	NPP
Atiwa East	Abena Osei Asare	NPP	12,437	Abena Osei Asare	NPP
Atiwa West	Kwesi Amoako Atta	NPP	12,461	Kwesi Amoako Atta	NPP
Ayensuano	Samuel Ayeh-Paye	NPP	3,716	Samuel Ayeh-Paye	NPP
Fanteakwa North	Kwabena Amankwa Asiamah	NPP	1,908	Kwabena Amankwa Asiamah	NPP
Fanteakwa South	Kofi Okyere-Agyekum	NPP	5,548	Kofi Okyere-Agyekum	NPP
Kade	Kwabena Ohemeng-Tinyase	NPP	19,354	Ofosu Asamoah	NPP
Lower Manya Krobo	Ebenezer Okletey Terlabi	NDC	327	Ebenezer Okletey Terlabi	NDC
Lower West Akim	Eyiah Kyei Baffour	NPP	9,045	Gifty Klenam	NPP
Mpraeso	Seth Kwame Acheampong	NPP	12,986	Seth Kwame Acheampong	NPP
New Juaben North	Kwasi Boateng Adjei	NPP	11,643	Hackman Owusu-Agyeman	NPP
New Juaben South	Mark Assibey-Yeboah	NPP	20,528	Mark Assibey-Yeboah	NPP
Nkawkaw	Eric Kwakye Darfour	NPP	25,088	Eric Kwakye Darfour	NPP
Nsawam Adoagyiri	Frank Annoh-Dompreh	NPP	8,271	Frank Annoh-Dompreh	NPP
Ofoase-Ayirebi	Kojo Oppong-Nkrumah	NPP	9,601	David Oppong Kusi	NPP
Okere	Daniel Botwe	NPP	9,825	Daniel Botwe	NPP
Suhum	Frederick Opare-Ansah	NPP	9,825	Frederick Opare-Ansah	NPP
Upper Manya Krobo	Joseph Tetteh	NPP	3,376	Jeff Kavianu	NDC
Upper West Akim	Ohene Assifo Derek Bekoe	NPP	430	Joseph Sam Amankwanor	NDC
Yilo Krobo	Magnus Kofi Amoatey	NDC	7,529	Magnus Kofi Amoatey	NDC
=== Greater Accra Region - 34 seats ===
Constituency	Elected MP	Elected Party	Majority	Previous MP	Previous Party
Ablekuma Central	Ebenezer Gilbert Nii Narh Nartey	NPP	6,198	Theophilus Tetteh Chaie	NDC
Ablekuma North	Nana Akua Owusu Afriyie	NPP	27,885	Justice Joe Appiah	NPP
Ablekuma South	Alfred Okoe Vanderpuije	NDC	5,432	Fritz Baffour	NDC
Ablekuma West	Ursula G Owusu	NPP	13,400	Ursula G Owusu	NPP
Ada	Comfort Doyoe Cudjoe-Ghansah (Second Deputy Minority Whip)	NDC	15,792	Comfort Doyoe Cudjoe-Ghansah	NDC
Adenta	Asamoa Yaw Buaben	NPP	1,364	Emmanuel Nii Ashie Moore	NDC
Amasaman	Emmanuel Nii Okai Laryea	NDC	268	Emmanuel Nii Okai Laryea	NDC
Anyaa-Sowutuom	Shirley Ayorkor Botchwey	NPP	30,861	Shirley Ayorkor Botchwey	NPP
Ashaiman	Ernest Henry Norgbey	NDC	16,703	Alfred Kwame Agbesi	NDC
Ayawaso Central	Henry Quartey	NPP	6,546	Henry Quartey	NPP
Ayawaso East	Naser Mahama Toure	NDC	9,808	Naser Mahama Toure	NDC
Ayawaso North	Yussif I Jajah	NDC	7,500	Mustapha Ahmed (Formerly MP for Ayawaso East)	NDC
Ayawaso West Wuogon^{a}^{g}	Emmanuel Kyeremanteng Agyarko^{a}	NPP	10,057	Emmanuel Kyeremateng Agyarko	NPP
Bortianor-Ngleshie-Amanfro	Habiab Saad	NPP	6,629	Bright Edward Kodzo Demordzi	NDC
Dade Kotopon	Vincent Sowah-Odote	NPP	1,622	Nii Amasah Namoale	NDC
Dome Kwabenya	Sarah Adwoa Safo (Deputy Majority Leader)	NPP	34,096	Sarah Adwoa Safo	NPP
Domeabra-Obom	Sophia Karen Edem Ackuaku	NDC	10,591	Daoud Anum Yemoh	NPP
Korle Klottey	Zenator Agyeman Rawlings	NDC	4,487	Nii Armah Ashietey	NDC
Kpone-Katamanso	Joseph Nii Laryea Afotey Agbo	NDC	3,540	Joseph Nii Laryea Afotey Agbo	NDC
Krowor	Elizabeth Afoley Quaye	NPP	2,106	Nii Oakley Quaye-Kumah	NDC
Ledzokuku	Benard Oko-Boye	NPP	2,167	Benita Sena Okity-Duah	NDC
Madina	Saddique Boniface Abu-bakar	NPP	8,633	Amadu Bukari Sorogho	NDC
Ningo-Prampram	Samuel George Nartey	NDC	10,272	Enoch Teye Mensah	NDC
Odododiodio	Edwin Nii Lantey Vanderpuye	NDC	9,935	Edwin Nii Lantey Vanderpuye	NDC
Okaikwei Central	Patrick Yaw Boamah	NPP	10,875	Patrick Yaw Boamah	NPP
Okaikwei North	Issah Fuseini	NPP	4,466	Elizabeth Kwatsoe Tawiah Sackey	NPP
Okaikwei South	Ahmed Arthur	NPP	11,896	Ahmed Arthur	NPP
Sege	Christian Corleytey Otuteye	NDC	1,927	Christian Corleytey Otuteye	NDC
Shai-Osudoku ^{g}	Linda Obenwaa Akweley Ocloo^{g}	NDC	13,596	David Tetteh Assumeng	NDC
Tema Central	Kofi Brako	NPP	15,397	Kofi Brako	NPP
Tema East	Daniel Nii Kwartey Titus-Glover	NPP	4,025	Daniel Nii Kwartey Titus-Glover	NPP
Tema West	Carlos Kingsley Ahenkora	NPP	14,837	Irene Naa Torshie Addo	NPP
Trobu	Moses Anim (Second Deputy Majority Whip)	NPP	22,600	Moses Anim	NPP
Weija Gbawe	Tina Gifty Naa Ayeley Mensah	NPP	9,129	Rosemund Comfort Abrah	NPP
=== Northern Region - 18 seats ===
Constituency	Elected MP	Elected Party	Majority	Previous MP	Previous Party
Bimbilla	Dominc Aduna Bingab Nitiwul	NPP	11,909	Dominc Aduna Bingab Nitiwul (Deputy Minority leader)	NPP
Gushiegu	Ziblim Iddi	NPP	4,050	Thomas Kwesi Nassan	NDC
Karaga	Alhassan Sualihu Dandaawa	NDC	5,393	Alhassan Sualihu Dandaawa	NDC
Kpandai	Matthew Nyindam (First Deputy Majority Whip)	NPP	743	Matthew Nyindam	NPP
Kumbungu	Ras Mubarak	NDC	10,372	Amadu Moses Yahaya	CPP
Mion	Abdul-Aziz Mohammed	NDC	5,827	Ahmed Alhassan Yakubu	NDC
Nanton	Mohammed Hardi Tuferu	NPP	895	Ibrahim Murtala Muhammed	NDC
Saboba	Charles Bintin Binipon	NPP	4,607	Bukari Nikpe Joseph	NDC
Sagnarigu	Alhassan Bashir Fuseini	NDC	19,010	Alhassan Bashir Fuseini	NDC
Savelugu	Abdul-Samed Gunu Mohammed	NPP	744	Mary Salifu Boforo	NDC
Tamale Central	Alhassan Inusah Fuseini	NDC	13,301	Alhassan Inusah Fuseini	NDC
Tamale North	Suhuyini Alhassan Sayibu	NDC	15,951	Alhassan Dahamani	Independent
Tamale South	Haruna Iddrisu (Minority Leader)	NDC	33,303	Haruna Iddrisu	NDC
Tatale-Sanguli	Tampi Achemapong Simon	NDC	2,344	James C Yanwube	NPP
Tolon	Wahab Suhiyini Wumbei	NPP	1,057	Wahab Suhiyini Wumbei	NPP
Wulensi	Thomas Donkor Ogajah	NPP	3,889	Laliri George Maban	NDC
Yendi	Mohammad Habibu Tijani	NPP	3,194	Mohammad Habibu Tijani	NPP
Zabzugu (Formerly Zabzugu-Tatale)	Alhassan Umar	NDC	157	Jabaah John Bennam	NPP
=== North East Region - 6 seats ===
Constituency	Elected MP	Elected Party	Majority	Previous MP	Previous Party
Bunkpurugu	Solomon Namliit Boar	NPP	284	Solomon Namliit Boar	NPP
Chereponi	Samuel Abdulai Jabanyite	NDC	1,530	Azumah Namoro Sanda	NPP
Nalerigu Gambaga	Alima Hajia Mahama	NPP	4,351	Tia Alfred Sugri	NDC
Walewale	Sagre Bambangi	NPP	2,580	Sagre Bambangi	NPP
Yagaba-Kubori (Walewale West)	Abdul-Rauf Tanko Ibrahim	NDC	2,696	Ussif Mustapha	NPP
Yunyoo	Naabu Joseph Bipoba	NDC	372	Naabu Joseph Bipoba	NDC
=== Oti Region - 8 seats ===
Constituency	Elected MP	Elected Party	Majority	Previous MP	Previous Party
Akan	Azuz Abdl Amuniru	NDC	4,211	Joseph Kwadwo Ofori	Independent
Biakoye	Nyanpong Kojo Aboagye	NDC	11,436	Emmanuel Kwasi Bandua	NDC
Buem	Daniel Kosi Ashiamah	NDC	8,903	Daniel Kosi Ashiamah	NDC
Krachi East^{f}	Yaw Michael Gyato	NPP	47^{f}	Wisdom Gidisu	NDC
Krachi Nchumuru	John Majisi	NDC	977	John Majisi	NDC
Krachi West	Helen Adjoa Ntoso	NDC	4,628	Helen Adjoa Ntoso	NDC
Nkwanta North	John Oti Kwabena Bless	NDC	8,035	John Oti Kwabena Bless	NDC
Nkwanta South	Geoffrey Kini	NDC	12,788	Gershon Kofi Bediako Gbediame	NDC
=== Savannah Region - 7 seats ===
Constituency	Elected MP	Elected Party	Majority	Previous MP	Previous Party
Bole Bamboi	Yusif Sulemana	NDC	11,615	Joseph Akati Saaka (Former MP for Bole)	NDC
Daboya-Mankarigu	Shaibu Mahama Kalba	NDC	619	Tika Samuel Yeyu	NPP
Damango	Adam Mutawakilu	NDC	2,124	Adam Mutawakilu	NDC
Salaga North	Alhassan Mumuni	NDC	3,326	Alhassan Mumuni	NDC
Salaga South^{f}	Salifu Adam Braimah	NPP	47^{f}	Ibrahim Dey Abubakari	NDC
Sawla-Tuna-Kalba	Andrew Dari Chiwetey	NDC	8,908	Donald Dari Soditey	NDC
Yapei-Kusawgu	John Abdulai Jinapor	NDC	3,794	Amadu Seidu	NDC
=== Upper East Region - 15 seats ===
Constituency	Elected MP	Elected Party	Majority	Previous MP	Previous Party
Bawku Central	Mahama Ayariga	NDC	1,507	Mahama Ayariga	NDC
Binduri	Robert Baba Kuganab-Lem	NDC	5,614	Noah Ben Azure	NDC
Bolgatanga Central	Isaac Adongo	NDC	9,432	Emmanuel Opam-brown Akolbire	NDC
Bolgatanga East	Dominic Akuritinga Ayine	NDC	6,268	Dominic Akuritinga Ayine	NDC
Bongo	Edward Abambire Bawa	NDC	5,510	Albert Abongo	NDC
Builsa North	James Agalga	NDC	5,234	James Agalga	NDC
Builsa South	Clement Apaak	NDC	3,204	Alhassan Azong	PNC
Chiana-Paga	Rudolph Nsowine Amenga-Etego	NDC	3,908	Abuga Pele	NDC
Garu	Albert Akuka Alaalzuga	NDC	1,953	Dominic Azimbe Azumah	NDC
Nabdam	Mark Kurt Nawaane	NDC	2,845	Boniface Gambila Adagbila	NPP
Navrongo Central	Joseph Kofi Adda	NPP	3,464	Mark Owen Woyongo	NDC
Pusiga	Laadi Ayii Ayamba	NDC	5,528	Laadi Ayii Ayamba	NDC
Talensi	Benson Tongo Baaba	NDC	3,674	Benson Tongo Baaba	NDC
Tempane	Joseph Dindiock Kpemka	NPP	2,666	David Adakudugu	NDC
Zebilla	Frank Fuseini Adongo	NPP	240	Cletus Apul Avoka	
=== Upper West Region - 11 seats ===
Constituency	Elected MP	Elected Party	Majority	Previous MP	Previous Party
Daffiama-Bussie-Issa	Sebastian Ngmenenso Sandaare	NDC	3,793	Puozaa Mathias Asuma (Former MP Nadowli East)	NDC
Jirapa	Francis Bawaana Dakurah	NDC	13,319	Paul Derigubah	Independent
Lambussie	Edward Kaale-Ewola Dery	NDC	2,821	Edward Kaale-Ewola Dery	NDC
Lawra	Anthony N-Yoh Abayifaa Karboh	NPP	1,228	Samson Abu	NDC
Nadowli Kaleo	Alban Sumana Kingsford Bagbin (Second Deputy Speaker)	NDC	4,890	Alban Sumana Kingsford Bagbin	NDC
Nandom	Ambrose Dery	NPP	878	Benjamin Kunbuor	NDC
Sissala East	Abass Ridwan Dauda	NPP	796	Sulemana Alijata	NDC
Sissala West	Patrick Al-hassan Adamah	NPP	3,368	Amin Amidu Sulemana	NDC
Wa Central	Abdul-Rashid Hassan Pelpuo	NDC	571	Abdul-Rashid Hassan Pelpuo	NDC
Wa East	Bayon Godfrey Tangu	NPP	1,336	Ameen Salifu	NDC
Wa West	Joseph Yieleh Chireh	NDC	5,243	Joseph Yieleh Chireh	NDC
=== Volta Region - 18 seats ===
Constituency	Elected MP	Elected Party	Majority	Previous MP	Previous Party
Adaklu	Kwame Governs Agbodza	NDC	9,289	Kwame Governs Agbodza	NDC
Afadjato South	Oforiwaa Angela Alorwu-Tay	NDC	16,353	Joseph Zaphenat Amenowode (former MP for Hohoe South)	NDC
Agotime-Ziope	Charles Ageve	NDC	8,385	Juliana Azumah-Mensah (Ho East)	NDC
Akatsi North	Peter Nortsu-Kotoe	NDC	10,103	Peter Nortsu-Kotoe	NDC
Akatsi South	Bernard Ahiafor	NDC	4,940	Bernard Ahiafor	NDC
Anlo	Clement Kofi Humado	NDC	19,236	Clement Kofi Humado	NDC
Central Tongu	Alexander R Hottordze	NDC	23,532	Joe Kwashie Gidisu	NDC
Ho Central	Benjamin Komla Kpodo	NDC	41,299	Benjamin Komla Kpodo	NDC
Ho West	Emmanuel Kwasi Bedzra	NDC	23,819	Emmanuel Kwasi Bedzra	NDC
Hohoe	Bernice Adiku Heloo	NDC	28,975	Bernice Adiku Heloo	NDC
Keta	Richard Quashigah	NDC	26,478	Richard Quashigah	NDC
Ketu North	James Klutse Avedzi (Deputy Minority Leader)	NDC	9,664	James Klutse Avedzi	NDC
Ketu South	Fifi Fiavi Franklin Kwetey	NDC	44,575	Fifi Fiavi Franklin Kwetey	NDC
Kpando	Della Sowah	NDC	14,260	Della Sowah	NDC
North Dayi	Joycelin Tetteh	NDC	9,999	George Loh	NDC
North Tongu	Samuel Okudzeto Ablakwa	NDC	19,184	Samuel Okudzeto Ablakwa	NDC
South Dayi	K E Rockson-Nelson Dafeamekpor	NDC	8,092	Simon Edem Asimah	NDC
South Tongu	Kobena Mensah Wisdom Woyome	NDC	28,383	Kobena Mensah Wisdom Woyome	NDC
=== Western Region - 17 seats ===
Constituency	Elected MP	Elected Party	Majority	Previous MP	Previous Party
Ahanta West	Ebenezer Kojo Kum	NPP	16,812	George Kwame Aboagye	NDC
Amenfi Central	Peter Yaw Kwakye Ackah	NDC	545	George Kofi Arthur	NDC
Amenfi East	Patrick Bogyako-Saim	NPP	5,254	Akwasi Opong-Fosu	NDC
Amenfi West	Eric Afful	NDC	6,337	Eric Afful	NDC
Effia	Joseph Cudjoe	NPP	8,320	Joseph Cudjoe	NPP
Ellembelle	Emmanuel Armah-Kofi Buah	NDC	2,550	Emmanuel Armah-Kofi Buah	NDC
Essikado-Ketan	Joe Ghartey	NPP	9,629	Joe Ghartey; Second Deputy Speaker	NPP
Evalue-Ajomoro-Gwira	Catherine Abelema Afeku	NPP	1,586	Kweku Tanikyi Kessie	NDC
Jomoro	Paul Essien	NPP	4,453	Francis Kabenlah Anaman	NDC
Kwesimintsim	Joseph Mensah	NPP	12,122	Joe Baidoo-Ansah	NPP
Mpohor	Alex Kofi Agyekum	NPP	1,417	Alex Kofi Agyekum	NPP
Prestea-Huni Valley	Barbara Oten-Gyasi	NPP	4,371	Francis Adu-Blay Koffie	NDC
Sekondi	Andrew Kofi Egyapa Mercer	NPP	5,764	Papa Owusu-Ankomah	NPP
Shama	Ato Panford	NPP	4,975	Gabriel Kodwo Essilfie	NDC
Takoradi	Kwabena Okyere Darko-Mensah	NPP	15,946	Kwabena Okyere Darko-Mensah	NPP
Tarkwa-Nsuaem	George Mireku Duker	NPP	18,550	Gifty Eugenia Kusi	NPP
Wassa East	Isaac Adjei Mensah	NDC	2,014	Isaac Adjei Mensah	NDC
=== Western North Region - 9 seats ===
Constituency	Elected MP	Elected Party	Majority	Previous MP	Previous Party
Aowin	Mathias Kwame Ntow	NDC	1,605	Mathias Kwame Ntow	NDC
Bia East	Richard Acheampong	NDC	6,113	Richard Acheampong	NDC
Bia West	Augustine Tawiah	NDC	13,812	Michael Coffie Boampong	NDC
Bibiani-Anhwiaso-Bekwai	Kingsley Aboagye-Gyedu	NPP	3,244	Kingsley Aboagye-Gyedu	NPP
Bodi	Sampson Ahi	NDC	4,004	Sampson Ahi	NDC
Juabeso	Kwabena Mintah Akandoh	NDC	1,629	Kwabena Mintah Akandoh	NDC
Sefwi-Akontombra	Djornobuah Alex Tetteh	NPP	296	Herod Cobbina	NDC
Sefwi-Wiawso	Kwaku Afriyie	NPP	5,631	Paul Evans Aidoo	NDC
Suaman^{f}	Kofi Essuah Michael Stephen Ackah	NDC	12^{f}	Stephen Michael Essuah Kofi Ackah	NDC

== Changes ==
- ^a Emmanuel Kyeremateng Agyarko, MP for Ayawaso West Wuogon in the Greater Accra Region died in the United States where he had been receiving medical treatment on 21 November 2018.
- ^bDecember 2018 - A referendum was conducted on 27 December 2018 on the creation of six new regions. All the new regions were approved. The Brong-Ahafo region was split into three, adding the Bono and the Bono East regions. The Northern Region was also split into three, the new additions being Savannah Region and North East Region. The Oti Region was carved out of the Volta Region and the Western Region was split into Western and Western North Region respectively.
- ^c - Mfantseman - 9 October 2020: The incumbent MP, Ekow Hayford of the NPP was murdered by armed robbers on the Nkusukum Mankessim-Abeadze Duadze Road on his way from a campaign trip. As his death is less than three months before the 2020 Ghanaian general election, Article 112 (5) of the 1992 Ghanaian Constitution stipulates that there shouldl not be a by-election in the constituency.
- ^d - Fomena - Following the decision of the standing MP, Andrew Amoako Asiamah to stand as an independent candidate in the 2020 Ghanaian general election, the NPP which he had left, petitioned the Speaker of Parliament to expel him as by registering as an independent candidate, the party no more recognised him as a member. Mike Oquaye subsequently ruled that his seat had become vacant in line with Article 97(1)(g) of the constitution.

== By-elections ==
- Ayawaso West - 31 January 2019 - Following the death of Emmanuel Agyarko of the New Patriotic Party (NPP), the Electoral Commission of Ghana conducted a by-election. This was contested by four parties. The National Democratic Congress (NDC) declared on the eve of the election that they were withdrawing their candidate due to some reported violence. The election was won by one of the wives of the deceased former MP, Lydia Seyram Alhassan of the NPP with 68.8% of the votes. Kwasi Delali Brempong of the NDC, whose name was still on the ballot was the runner up with 30.52% of the votes. William Kofi Dowokpor of the Progressive People's Party had 0.58% while Clement Boadi of the Liberal Party of Ghana had 0.1% of the total votes cast.
- Mfantseman - As the death of the sitting MP, Ekow Hayford was less than 3 months before the 2020 Ghanaian general election, no by-election was arranged as stipulated by the Ghanaian Constitution.

== Notes ==
- ^e The largest winning majority in the 2016 election of 58,084 was by Francisca Oteng-Mensah of the NPP in the Kwabre East constituency of the Ashanti Region. The other constituencies with majorities greater than 50,000 are all in the Ashanti Region. They are Kwadaso where Samiu Kwadwo Nuamah of the NPP had a margin of 55,386 and Suame where Osei Kyei Mensah Bonsu also of the NPP had a winning majority of 54,443.
- ^f The smallest winning majority of just 12 votes was by Kofi Essuah Michael Stephen Ackah of the NDC in the Suaman constituency in the Western Region. Since the creation of new regions in December 2018, it is now located within the Western North Region. Other constituencies with very small winning margins are Salaga South, Savannah Region where Salifu Adam Braimah of NPP had 47, Krachi East, Oti Region, Michael Yaw Gyato of NPP, 47, Pru West, Bono East Region, Masawud Mohammed, NDC, 42 and Tain, Bono Region, where Gabriel Osei, NPP had a winning majority of 41.
- ^g Linda Obenewaa Akweley Ocloo, MP for Shai-Osudoku constituency only stood for election in 2016 because her husband, who was the designated NDC parliamentary candidate, died prior to the election. The MP for Ayawaso West, Emmanuel Agyarko also died during the lifetime of this parliament and was replaced by his wife, Lydia Alhassan in the subsequent by-election.
- ^h Francisca Oteng-Mensah, MP for Kwabre East was reportedly the youngest member of parliament. She entered parliament at the age of 23 years.
- ^i A total of 11 members decided to retire from parliament and not contest the 2020 general election. Those from the NPP who retired were Anthony Akoto Osei, MP for Tafo Pankrono, Kwabena Appiah-Pinkrah, MP for Akrofuom, Ziblim Iddi MP for Gushegu and Shirley Ayorkor Botchwey MP for Anyaa Sowutuom. The 7 from the NDC who retired were Alban Bagbin, MP for Nadowli, Richard Quashigah, MP for Keta, Inusah Fuseini, Tamale Central, Bernice Adiku Heloo, Hohoe, Magnus Kofi Amoatey, Yilo Krobo, Clement Kofi Humado, Anlo and Fiifi Kwetey for Ketu South. In addition, 41 NPP MPs and 8 NDC MPs also lost out in the primaries.

== See also ==
- List of female members of the Seventh Parliament of the Fourth Republic of Ghana
- 2016 Ghanaian general election
- Parliament of Ghana
- Mike Oquaye - Speaker of the 7th Parliament of the 4th Republic.
