= John Tia =

Ghanaian politician (1954–2024)

Hon. John Akologu Tia

Member of the Ghana Parliament for Talensi
- In office 7 January 1993 – 6 January 2013
- Preceded by: David Zanlerigu
- Succeeded by: Benson Tongo Baba

Minister for Information
- In office 2010–2012
- President: John Atta Mills
- Preceded by: Zita Okaikoi
- Succeeded by: Fritz Baffour

Personal details
- Born: 23 September 1954 Gambaga, Northern Territories of the Gold Coast
- Died: 24 March 2024 (aged 69) Bolgatanga, Ghana
- Party: National Democratic Congress
- Children: 4
- Education: Ghana Institute of Journalism
- Profession: Journalist, Politician

John Akologu Tia (23 September 1954 – 24 March 2024) was a Ghanaian politician who served as Minister for Information. He was the Member of Parliament for Talensi from 7 January 1993 until he lost to Robert Nachinab Doameng in the 2012 General election.

== Early life and education ==
Akologu was born at Gambaga in the Northern Region of Ghana. He attended the Zobzia Primary School and then the Local Authority Middle School both at Gambaga. His secondary education was at the Tamale Secondary School from 1969 to 1974 where he obtained the GCE Ordinary Level. He later obtained a Diploma in Journalism at the Ghana Institute of Journalism in 1980. He was a student at the Ghana Institute of Management and Public Administration (GIMPA) from 2005 to 2008. He was awarded the Certificate in Management in June 2006. He then got a Diploma in Public Administration in June 2007 and a Bachelor of Arts degree in Public Administration in 2008.

== Career ==
Tia first worked as a pupil teacher between 1974 and 1976. He then worked with the Information Services Department in Ghana in various capacities taking him from Gambaga to Bolgatanga in 1980. Between 1982 and 1990, he worked with the Ghana News Agency. Akologu was active in the Trade Unions between 1985 and 1992. He was a branch secretary and National Executive Council member of the Public Services Workers' Union.

== Politics ==
Tia got involved in local politics in 1982 when he became the Press Secretary of the Upper East Regional Secretariat of Peoples Defence Committees/Workers Defence Committees set up by the Provisional National Defence Council military government. He was elected an MP in the 1992 parliamentary election as a National Democratic Congress candidate. He was the MP for Talensi constituency from the first parliament in the Fourth Republic in January 1993. He was a Member of the ECOWAS Parliament beginning in 2007. In 2009, he was appointed by President Mills as Minister for Information.

== Elections ==
Akologu was first elected into Parliament during the December 1992 Ghanaian parliamentary election. He was re-elected in 1996 when he won with 16,978 votes out of the 23,815 valid votes cast representing 56.60% over Mariam Adukuma Abagna Kahid who polled 5,759 votes representing 19.20% and Belmogre Caspard Nyaaba who polled 1,078 votes representing 3.60%. He won in the 2000 general election with 9,655 votes out of the 21,311 valid votes cast representing 45.30% over Hajia M. A. Abagna-Khaldi who polled 7,607 votes representing 35.70%, Samuel Kuug Narook who polled 3,341 votes representing 15.70%, John T.Z. Yaroh who polled 459 votes representing 2.20% and Oscar Kurug Tindaan who polled 249 votes representing 1.20%.

Tia was elected once again as the member of parliament for the Talensi constituency in the 2004 Ghanaian general election. He won on the ticket of the National Democratic Congress. His constituency was a part of the 9 parliamentary seats out of 13 seats won by the National Democratic Congress in that election for the Upper East Region. The National Democratic Congress won a minority total of 94 parliamentary seats out of 230 seats. He was elected with 8,346 votes out of 22,148 total valid votes cast. This was equivalent to 37.4% of total valid votes cast. He was elected over Samuel Kuug Narook of the Peoples’ National Convention, Hajia Mariam Abagna Khalidi of the New Patriotic Party, John Teroug Zongbil of the Convention People's Party and Robert N. Doameng Mosore an independent candidate. These obtained 3,001, 5,354, 865 and 4,582 votes respectively of total votes cast. These were equivalent to 13.5%, 24.2%, 3.9% and 20.7% respectively of total valid votes cast.

== Personal life and death ==
Akologu was married with four children. He died at the Upper East Regional Hospital on 24 March 2024, at the age of 69. Akologu is a Christian.

== See also ==
- List of Mills government ministers

== External links and sources ==
- John Tia on Ghana Parliament website
- Profile on Ghana government website
- Profile on GhanaDistricts.com

Parliament of Ghana
New title	Talensi; 1993–2013	Succeeded by Benson Tongo Baba
Political offices
Preceded by Zita Okaikoi	Minister for Information; 2010–2012	Succeeded by Fritz Baffour
