= Agyekum =

Agyekum is a surname. Notable people with the name include:

- Joseph Kwaku Afrifah-Agyekum (born 1954), Ghanaian Catholic prelate
- Alex Kofi Agyekum (born 1962), Ghanaian politician and member of parliament
- Beryl Agyekum, Ghanaian Digital Marketer, Founder and CEO of Echo House Ghana Limited
- Daniel Ohene Agyekum (born 1942), Ghanaian diplomat, politician and ambassador
- Dennis Agyekum (born 1996), Ghanaian footballer
- Emil Agyekum (born 1999), German hurdler and sprinter
- Emmanuel Kwadwo Agyekum, Ghanaian politician and a member of parliament
- Jeremie Agyekum Frimpong (born 2000), Dutch professional footballer
- John Agyekum Kuffuor (born 1938), Ghanaian politician, President of Ghana,
- Junior Agyekum (born 2002), Canadian soccer player
- Kofi Okyere-Agyekum (born 1958), Ghanaian politician and member of parliament
- Kwame Poku Agyekum, Ghanaian politician and member of parliament
- Lawrence Agyekum (born 2003), Ghanaian professional footballer
- Mark Agyekum (born 1992), Ghanaian professional footballer
- Owusu Agyekum (born 1942), Ghanaian politician and a member of parliament
- Forster-Khiz Agyekum, Ghanaian banking professional

== See also ==
- FPSO John Agyekum Kufour, floating production storage and offloading (FPSO) vessel
