= Kyei =

Kyei is a surname. It may refer to:

Surname

- Afua Kyei (born 1982), British financial executive, CFO of the Bank of England
- F. P. Kyei, Ghanaian police officer, Inspector General of Police
- Grejohn Kyei (born 1995), French footballer
- Jeffrey Kyei (born 1989), German footballer
- Nana Kyei (born 1998), English footballer
- Obi Kyei (born 1994), Australian-British basketball player

Middle name

- Eyiah Kyei Baffour (born 1968), Ghanaian politician and member of the Ghanaian Parliament
- Osei Kyei Mensah Bonsu (born 1957), Ghanaian urban planner and politician.
- Kwadwo Kyei Frimpong (born 1946), Ghanaian politician and member of Parliament
- Jaren Kyei Merrell (born 1989), American drag queen known as Shea Couleé
