= Ameen Salifu =

Ghanaian politician

Hon. Ameen Salifu

Member of Parliament for Wa East, Upper West Region, Ghana
- Incumbent
- Assumed office 2012
- Preceded by: Bayon Godfrey Tangu

Personal details
- Born: 25 July 1965 (age 61) Wa, Upper West Region
- Party: National Democratic Congress
- Children: 3
- Education: London School of Economics
- Profession: Chartered surveyor

Ameen Salifu (born July 25, 1965) is a Ghanaian politician and member of the Sixth Parliament of the Fourth Republic of Ghana representing the Wa East Constituency in the Upper West Region of Ghana on the ticket of the National Democratic Congress.

== Personal life ==
Salifu is a Muslim (Ahmadi). He is married with three children.

== Early life and education ==
Salifu was born on July 25, 1965. He hails from Goripe, a town in the Western Region of Ghana. He entered University of East London and obtained his master's degree in NGO and Development Management in 2007. He also attended the London School of Economics and obtained his master's degree in science in International Housing and Social Change in 2000.

== Politics ==
Salifu is a member of the National Democratic Congress (NDC). In 2012, he contested for the Wa East seat on the ticket of the NDC sixth parliament of the fourth republic and won.

== Employment ==
- Capital Works Surveyor, Presentation Housing Association, London
- District Chief Executive (Wa District), April 2009 – January 7, 2013
