= Gyedu =

Gyedu is both a given name and surname. Notable people with the surname include:

- David Hickson Gyedu (born 1997), Norwegian footballer
- Gyedu-Blay Ambolley, Ghanaian highlife musician, songwriter, producer, and composer
- Kingsley Aboagye Gyedu (born 1969), Ghanaian politician
