= Elizabeth Amoah Tetteh =

Educationist and Ghanaian politician

Hon. Elizabeth Amoah-Tetteh

Member of Parliament
- In office 7 January 2005 – 6 January 2009
- President: John Kufuor
- Preceded by: None
- Constituency: Twifu-Atti Morkwaa

Member of Parliament
- In office 7 January 2009 – 6 January 2013
- President: John Atta Mills
- Succeeded by: Samuel Ato Amoah
- Constituency: Twifu-Atti Morkwaa
- Majority: NDC

Personal details
- Born: 25 November 1945 (age 80)
- Party: National Democratic Congress
- Education: Specialist training College, Winneba
- Occupation: Educationist

Elizabeth Amoah-Tetteh (born 25 November 1945) is an educationist and Ghanaian politician. She was the Member of Parliament for the Twifu-Atti Morkwaa constituency in the 5th Parliament of the 4th Republic of Ghana.

== Early life and education ==
Amoah-Tetteh was born on 25 November 1945. She hails from Twifo-Abodom in the Central Region of Ghana. In 1974 she obtained a Diploma in Physical Education at the Specialist Training College in Winneba.

== Career ==
Amoah-Tetteh worked as an assistant director for Data Collection at the Teacher Education Division of the Ghana Education Service in Accra. She was a member of Parliament for the Twifo-Atti Morkwaa constituency and also the Deputy Minister of Education in-charge of Pre-tertiary Education during regime of His Excellency the Ex-President of Ghana John Dramani Mahama.

== Politics ==
Elizabeth Amoah-Tetteh first represented the Twifo-Atti Morkwaa constituency as a member of parliament in the Fifth Parliament of the Fourth Republic of Ghana after winning on the ticket of the National Democratic Congress in the 2008 Ghanaian general elections. She obtained a total votes count of 14,724 votes out of the 28,632 valid votes cast representing 51.4% over her other candidates, Abraham Dwuma Odoom of the New Patriotic Party who pulled 13,086 votes representing 42.90% and Rose Buah-Bassuah of the Conventions People's Party who also obtained 1,577 votes representing 5.2%.

== Personal life ==
Amoah-Tetteh is married with seven children. She is a Christian.
