= Michael Yaw Gyato =

Ghanaian politician (born 1970)

Member of the Ghana Parliament for Krachi East Constituency

Personal details
- Born: 2 April 1970 (age 56) Dambai, Volta Region, Ghana
- Party: New Patriotic Party

Michael Yaw Gyato (born 2 April 1970) is a Ghanaian politician and member of the Seventh Parliament of the Fourth Republic of Ghana representing the Krachi East Constituency in the Volta Region on the ticket of the New Patriotic Party.

== Early life and education ==
Michael Gyato was born on 2 April 1970, in Dambai, in the Volta Region of Ghana. He acquired his HND from Accra Polytechnic and his Master's degree from the Ghana Institute of Management. He is the founder, Board Member and Executive Director of Smiling Heart Foundation. A non-profit organization in the Krachi East Municipality of the Oti Region that seeks to help the needy and provide support to people with disabilities.

== Political Life ==
Gyato served as the Deputy Minister for Sanitation and Water Resources in the first term of the Akuffo-Addo led government from 2017-2021

=== 2016 election ===
Michael Gyato contested the 2016 Ghanaian general election on the ticket of the New Patriotic Party for Krachi East constituency in the Volta Region of Ghana and won the election with 14,551 votes representing 49.74% of the total votes. He won the parliamentary seat over Wisdom Gidisu of the National Democratic Congress, who polled 14,504 votes which is equivalent to 49.58%, and the parliamentary candidate for the PPP Henry Awatwe who had 199 votes representing 0.68% of the total number of votes.

==== 2020 election ====
Gyato again contested the Krachi East Parliamentary seat on the New Patriotic Party ticket during the 2020 Ghanaian general election but lost the election to Wisdom Gidisu of the National Democratic Congress.
