= Godfred Seidu Jasaw =

Ghanaian politician

Hon. Godfred Seidu Jasaw
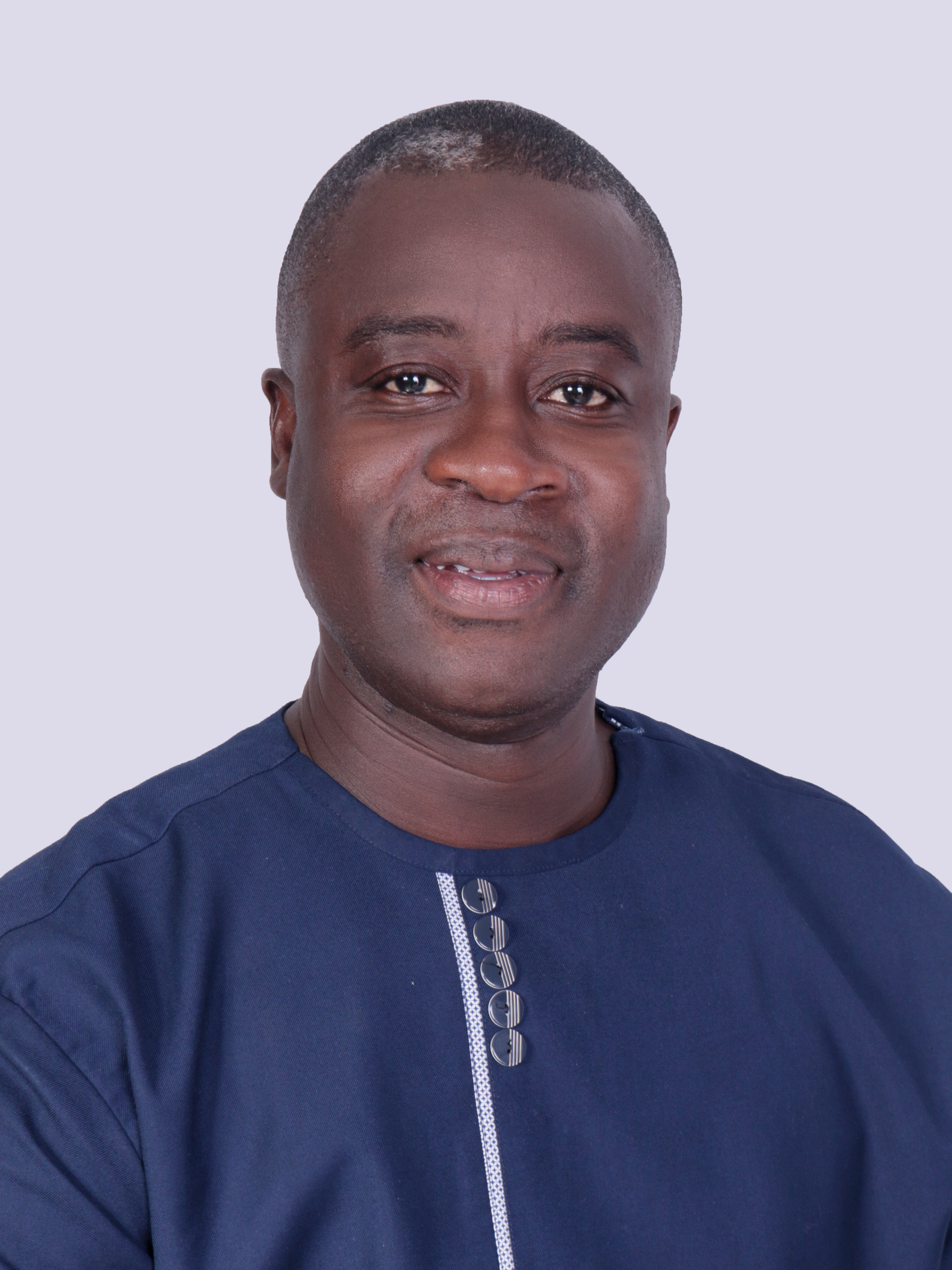

Member of the Ghana Parliament for Wa East
- Incumbent
- Assumed office 7 January 2020
- President: Nana Akufo-Addo
- Preceded by: Godfrey Tangu Bayon

Personal details
- Born: 14 March 1977 (age 49)
- Party: National Democratic Congress (Ghana)
- Children: 2
- Profession: Academic
- Committees: Food, Agriculture and Cocoa Affairs Committee (8th Parliament of 4th Republic of Ghana); House Committee (8th Parliament of 4th Republic of Ghana)

Godfred Seidu Jasaw (born 14 March 1977) is a Ghanaian politician and member of the National Democratic Congress. He is the member of parliament for the Wa East constituency in the Upper West Region of Ghana .

== Early life and education ==
Jasaw was born in Jeriyi on Monday, 14 March 1977. He holds a PHD (Sustainability science) – 2016, BSc (Agricultural Economics) – 2005.

== Politics ==
Jasaw was elected as a member of parliament for the Wa East constituency during the 2020 general elections. He was able to poll 16259 vote (59.99%).

In July 2025, Jasaw was appointed by President John Dramani Mahama for the position of board chair for the Ghana Export Promotion Authority.

== Personal life ==
Jasaw is a muslim.
