= Mutawakilu Adam =

Ghanaian politician

Hon. Mutawakilu Adam

Member of the Ghana Parliament for Damango Constituency
- In office 7 January 2013 – 6 January 2021
- Preceded by: split constituency
- Succeeded by: Samuel Abu Jinapor

Personal details
- Born: 2 March 1972 (age 54)
- Party: National Democratic Congress
- Children: 5
- Education: University of Ghana; Kwame Nkrumah University of Science and Technology
- Occupation: Accountant
- Committees: Mines and Energy; Members Holding Offices of Profit Committee

Mutawakilu Adam (born 2 March 1974) is a Ghanaian accountant and politician who is member of the Seventh Parliament of the Fourth Republic of Ghana representing the Damango Constituency in the Savanna Region on the ticket of the National Democratic Congress (NDC).

== Early life and education ==
Mutawakilu Adam comes from Damango in the Savanna Region.

He is an accountant and financial officer. He holds a teacher's certificate A from Bagabaga Training College. He earned a bachelor's degree in Administration from University of Ghana in 2002, and Commonwealth Executive Master of Business Administration (CEMBA) from Kwame Nkrumah University of Science and Technology in 2010.

== Career ==
Adam was nominated by John Evans Atta Mills to serve as district chief executive for West Gonja District, whose capital is Damango, his hometown. He served as DCE from May 2009 to January 2013. As DCE, he worked to improve the lives of the people within his communities, with a focus on education, water, sanitation and healthcare.

Prior to being appointed as DCE, Adam worked as a chief cashier and head of treasury from 2004 to 2009 at University for Development Studies, at the Central Administration in Tamale. He also worked as class tutor from 1996 to 2003 at Ghana Education Service.

== Politics ==
=== Member of Parliament ===
==== 2012 Elections ====
Adam contested for the Damango constituency seat in 2012 on the ticket of the National Democratic Congress, and won by getting 9,518 votes, representing 56.79% against Albert Kassim Diwura, his closest contender and the New Patriotic Party's candidate, who got 7,041 votes representing 42.01%. Adam served on the majority bench from 2013 to 2017 since his party had retained power in the elections through President John Dramani Mahama and had maintained their majority seats in parliament.

==== 2016 elections ====
In 2016, Adam contested for reelection for the Damango Constituency. He won the parliamentary elections by getting 10,263 votes, which represented 55.22%, against Albert Kassim Diwura, the same candidate from the 2012 elections, who this time had 8,139 votes representing 43.79%. His party lost the general presidential elections to the New Patriotic Party, and had lost their majority seats. Therefore, this time, he was to serve on the minority bench of the parliament.

Adam is a member of the Minority Bench of the 7th Parliament of the 4th Republic in Ghana. He is the minority spokesperson on Mines and Energy. He also served on the Members Holding Ofiices of Profit Committee.

Serving as the ranking member on Mines and Energy, Adam pushed to secure funding from the Ghana National Petroleum Corporation (GNPC) foundation for projects within his constituency. The projects included drilling of four mechanized boreholes, 12 hand pump boreholes and two 12 seater KVIPs in some selected communities as reported by the West Gonja District. In September 2020, he presented an ambulance to the Busunu Health Centre in fulfillment of a promise he made to the chiefs and people, to help in the transportation of patients from the health care to the district hospital.

Adam, in his capacity as ranking member on mines and energy, called for the arrest of both Prof. Frimpong-Boateng, Minister of Science and Technology, and the Minister for Lands and Natural Resources, regarding the scandal of about 500 missing excavators which were seized from illegal miners by the task force Galamstop.

== Personal life ==
Adam is a Muslim. He is married, with five children.
