= Abass Ridwan Dauda =

Ghanaian politician

Abass Ridwan Duada

Member of the Ghana Parliament for Sissala East Constituency

Personal details
- Born: 24 December 1983 (age 42)
- Party: New Patriotic Party

Abass Ridwan Dauda is a Ghanaian politician and member of the Seventh Parliament of the Fourth Republic of Ghana representing the Sissala East Constituency in the Upper West Region on the ticket of the New Patriotic Party.

== Early life and education ==
He graduated from Islamic University College in Ghana with a bachelor's degree in business administration and a certificate in broadcasting from Radio Broadcasting. Between 2013 and 2015, Abass Ridwan Dauda served as the administrator of Kolon Global Corporation after serving as the business manager at Radford FM from 2008 to 2012.
