= Mathias Kwame Ntow =

Ghanaian politician

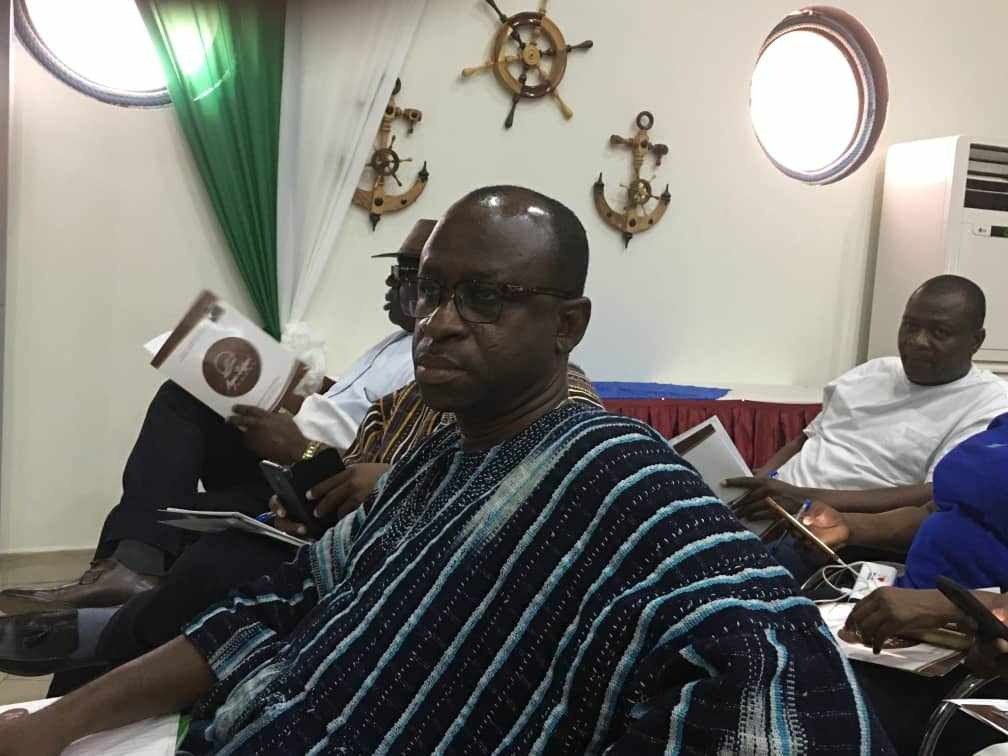

Member of the Ghana Parliament for Aowin Constituency

Personal details
- Born: 11 November 1957 (age 68) Nkwanta No. 2
- Party: National Democratic Congress
- Occupation: Politician
- Profession: Educationist

Mathias Kwame Ntow is a Ghanaian politician and member of the Seventh Parliament of the Fourth Republic of Ghana representing the Aowin Constituency in the Western Region on the ticket of the National Democratic Congress.

== Personal life ==
Elder Ntow is a Christian, a member of the Church of Pentecost. He is married to Mrs. Victoria Sam (with six children).

== Early life ==
Hon. Ntow was born in Nkwanta No. 2 on Monday, 11 November 1957. He attended the University of Winneba and had a Bachelor of Education Degree in Social Studies. He also had Teacher's Certificate A from the Enchi College of Education

Ntow graduated from University of Education Winneba with a Masters of Art in Human Rights in 2007.

== Career ==
Mr. Ntow is an Educationist by profession. He was also employed by GES (Principal Supt and Social Science Tutor, Enchi College of Education).

== Politics ==
Ntow is a member of the National Democratic Congress (NDC). In 2008, he contested for the Aowin seat on the ticket of the NDC for the fifth parliament of the fourth republic and won. He was the MP for Aowin Constituency, Western Region. He was also a member of parliament for the sixth and the seventh parliament of the fourth Republic of Ghana.

=== 2008 election ===
Ntow contested for Aowin constituency in the Western Region of Ghana on the ticket of the National Democratic Congress in the 2008 Ghanaian general election and won the parliamentary seat with 19,291 votes representing 54.09% of the total votes. He won the election over Samuel Adu Gyamfi of the New Patriotic Party who polled 15,393 votes representing 43.16%, parliamentary candidate for PNC Ebenezer Ebbi Kwaw Dankwa had 631 votes which is equivalent to 1.77% and parliamentary candidate for the Convention People's Party Martin Boadu had 347 votes representing 0.97% of the total votes.

==== 2012 election ====
Ntow was re-elected as a member of parliament for Aowin constituency in the Western Region of Ghana on the ticket of the National Democratic Congress during the 2012 Ghanaian general election. He was elected with 30,035 votes representing 56.67% of the total votes. He won the parliamentary seat over Samuel Adu Gyamfi of the New Patriotic Party, Solomon Appiah of IND, Abdu Hawa of PPP, and John Brew of the NDP. They obtained 21,030 votes, 756 votes, 700 votes, and 269 votes respectively, equivalent to 39.68%, 1.43%, 1.32%, and 0.51% of the total votes.

===== 2016 election =====
Ntow again contested the Aowin constituency in the Western Region of Ghana on the ticket of the National Democratic Congress in the 2016 Ghanaian general election and won the election with 22,385 representing 50.70% of the total votes. He won the parliamentary seat over Samuel Adu Gyamfi of the New Patriotic Party who polled 20,780 votes which is equivalent to 47.06%, parliamentary candidate for the PPP Isaac Wilson Kwaw had 853 votes representing 1.93% and parliamentary candidate for the Convention People's Party Solomon Asamoah had 134 votes representing 0.30% of the total votes.
