= David Oppong Kusi =

Ghanaian politician

Hon. David Oppong Kusi
- Constituency: Ayirebi/Ofoase

Member of Parliament
- In office 7 January 2009 – 6 January 2013
- President: John Atta Mills

Personal details
- Born: 9 August 1958 (age 68)
- Party: New Patriotic Party
- Children: 7
- Education: Kwame Nkrumah University of Science and Technology
- Profession: Development Planners/Architects/Quantity Surveyors

David Oppong Kusi is a Ghanaian politician and a member of the Sixth Parliament of the Fourth Republic of Ghana representing the Ofoase/Ayirebi Constituency in the Eastern Region on the ticket of the New Patriotic Party.

== Personal life ==
Kusi is a Christian (Methodist). He is married (with seven children).

== Early life and education ==
Kusi was born on 9 August 1958. He hails from Akyem Ofoase, a town in the Eastern Region of Ghana. He entered Kwame Nkrumah University of Science and Technology and obtained his Bachelor of Science degree in architectural technology in 1987. He also attended University of Ghana and obtained his Master of Business Administration degree in project management in 2006.

== Politics ==
Kusi was first elected into parliament on the ticket of the New Patriotic Party (NPP) during the December 2008 general elections as a member of parliament for Ofoase/Ayirebi constituency. He obtained 14,938 votes out of the 27,614 valid votes cast representing 54.10%. He again contested in 2012 elections of which he won with 19,025 votes out of the 35,262 valid votes cast representing 53.95%.

== Employment ==
- Contracts Manager, Department of Urban Roads, Accra
- Member of Parliament (January, 2005–present; 3rd term)
- Development worker/architect/quantity surveyor

== Ban on Plastics ==
Kusi called for a ban on the use of plastics on 1 June 2005. He said,"If we do not act now, we shall be engulfed with filth and pay a dear price in the future". He also made a claim that,"We are selfishly mortgaging the survival of future generation for the convenience of the current generation".
