= Noah Ben Azure =

Ghanaian politician

Noah Ben Azure (born December 5, 1960) is a Ghanaian politician and member of the Sixth Parliament of the Fourth Republic of Ghana representing the Binduri Constituency in the Upper East Region on the ticket of the National Democratic Congress.

== Personal life ==
Azure is a Christian (Assemblies of God Church). He is married (with three children).

== Early life and education ==
Azure was born on December 5, 1960. He hails from Binduri, a town in the Upper East Region of Ghana. He entered University of Education, Winneba, Mampong Campus and obtained his bachelor's degree in education in 2000.

== Politics ==
Azure is a member of the National Democratic Congress (NDC). In 2012, he contested for the Binduri seat on the ticket of the NDC sixth parliament of the fourth republic and won.
