= Eric Afful =

Ghanaian politician

Hon Eric Afful
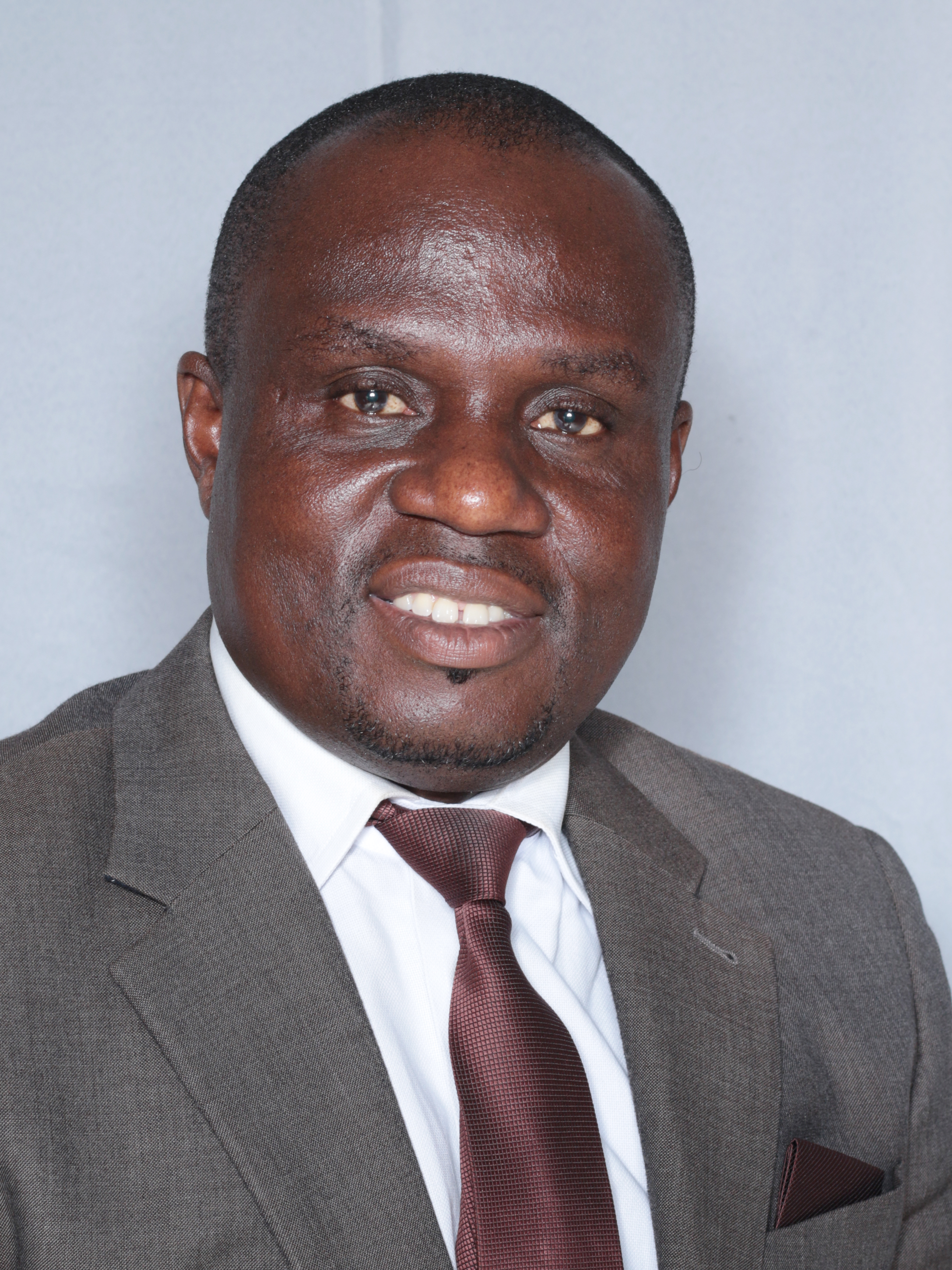

Member of the Ghana Parliament for Amenfi West
- Incumbent
- Assumed office 7 January 2021

Personal details
- Born: Eric Afful {1st January1974 Asankragwa
- Party: National Democratic Congress
- Occupation: Politician
- Committees: Health Committee, Business Committee

Eric Afful (born 1 January 1974) is a Ghanaian politician and member of the Seventh Parliament of the Fourth Republic of Ghana representing the Amenfi West Constituency in the Western Region on the ticket of the National Democratic Congress.

== Early life and education ==
Afful was born on 1 January 1974. He hails from Asankragwa, a town in the Western Region of Ghana. He entered Kwame Nkrumah University of Science and Technology and obtained his master's degree in Economic in 2010. He also went to University of Cape Coast, Ghana and obtained his Masters of Art in Human Resource Development in 2016.

== Politics ==
Afful is a member of the National Democratic Congress (NDC). In 2012, he contested for the Amenfi West seat on the ticket of the NDC sixth parliament of the fourth republic and won. He was also a member of the seventh parliament of the fourth republic of Ghana.

== Personal life ==
Afful is a Christian (Methodist). He is married (with three children).
