= Robert Nachinab Doameng =

Ghanaian politician

Robert Nachinab Doameng (born November 1, 1953) is a Ghanaian politician and member of the Sixth Parliament of the Fourth Republic of Ghana representing the Talensi Constituency in the Upper East Region on the ticket of the New Patriotic Party.

== Personal life ==
Doameng is a Christian (Catholic). He is married (with three children).

== Early life and education ==
Doameng was born on November 1, 1953. He hails from Tongo, a town in the Upper East Region of Ghana. He entered University of Cape Coast, Ghana and obtained his master's degree in Environmental Management and Policy in 2008.

== Politics ==
Doameng is a member of the New Patriotic Party (NPP). In 2012, he contested for the Talensi seat on the ticket of the NPP sixth parliament of the fourth republic and won.
