= Jeff Kavianu =

Ghanaian politician

Jeff Kavianu (born May 2, 1964) is a Ghanaian politician and member of the Sixth Parliament of the Fourth Republic of Ghana representing the Upper manya Krobo Central Constituency in the Eastern Region on the ticket of the National Democratic Congress.

== Personal life ==
Kavianu is a Christian (New Fountain of Life Ministries International; Presiding Elder). He is married with four children.

== Early life and education ==
Kavianu was born on May 2, 1964. He hails from Odumase-Krobo, a town in the Eastern Region of Ghana. He entered University of Gothenburg, Sweden, and obtained his bachelor's of science degree in social work in 2006.

== Politics ==
Kavianu is a member of the National Democratic Congress (NDC). In 2012, he contested for the Upper manya Krobo Central seat on the ticket of the NDC sixth parliament of the fourth republic and won.

== Employment ==
- CEO, Rural Water and Sanitation Services
- Manager/administrator/HR practitioner
