= Azumah Namoro Sanda =

Ghanaian educationist and politician (born 1956)

Azumah Namoro Sanda (born 4 November 1956) is the member of Parliament for Chereponi in the Northern region of Ghana. He is a member of the Sixth Parliament of the Fourth Republic of Ghana representing the Chereponi Constituency in the Northern Region on the ticket of the New Patriotic Party.

== Early life and education ==
Sanda was born on 4 November 1956 in Tiekasu in the Northern region. He earned a diploma in Basic Education at University of Education, Winneba in 2005.

== Career ==
Azumah is an educationist. He was District Coordinator, School from September, 2003 to January, 2009. He is a farmer.

== Political career ==
Sanda is a member of the New Patriotic Party (NPP). In 2012, he contested for the Chereponi seat on the ticket of the NPP sixth parliament of the fourth republic and won.

== Personal life ==
Sanda is married with nine children. He is a Muslim.
