= Alhassan Dahamani =

Ghanaian politician

Alhassan Dahamani (born June 6, 1968) is a Ghanaian politician and member of the Sixth Parliament of the Fourth Republic of Ghana representing the Tamale North Constituency in the Northern Region as an independent.

== Personal life ==
Dahamani is a Muslim. He is married (with three children).

== Early life and education ==
Dahamani was born on June 6, 1968. He hails from Damankunyilli – Tamale, a town in the Northern Region of Ghana. He entered University of Cape Coast, Ghana and obtained his bachelor's in Management Studies in 2008.

== Politics ==
In 2012, he contested as an independent for the Tamale North seat on the ticket of the sixth parliament of the fourth republic and won.

== Employment ==
- Senior Administrative Assistant, VRA-NEDCo, Sunyani
- Administrator
