= Benson Tongo Baba =

Ghanaian politician

Hon Benson Tongo Baba
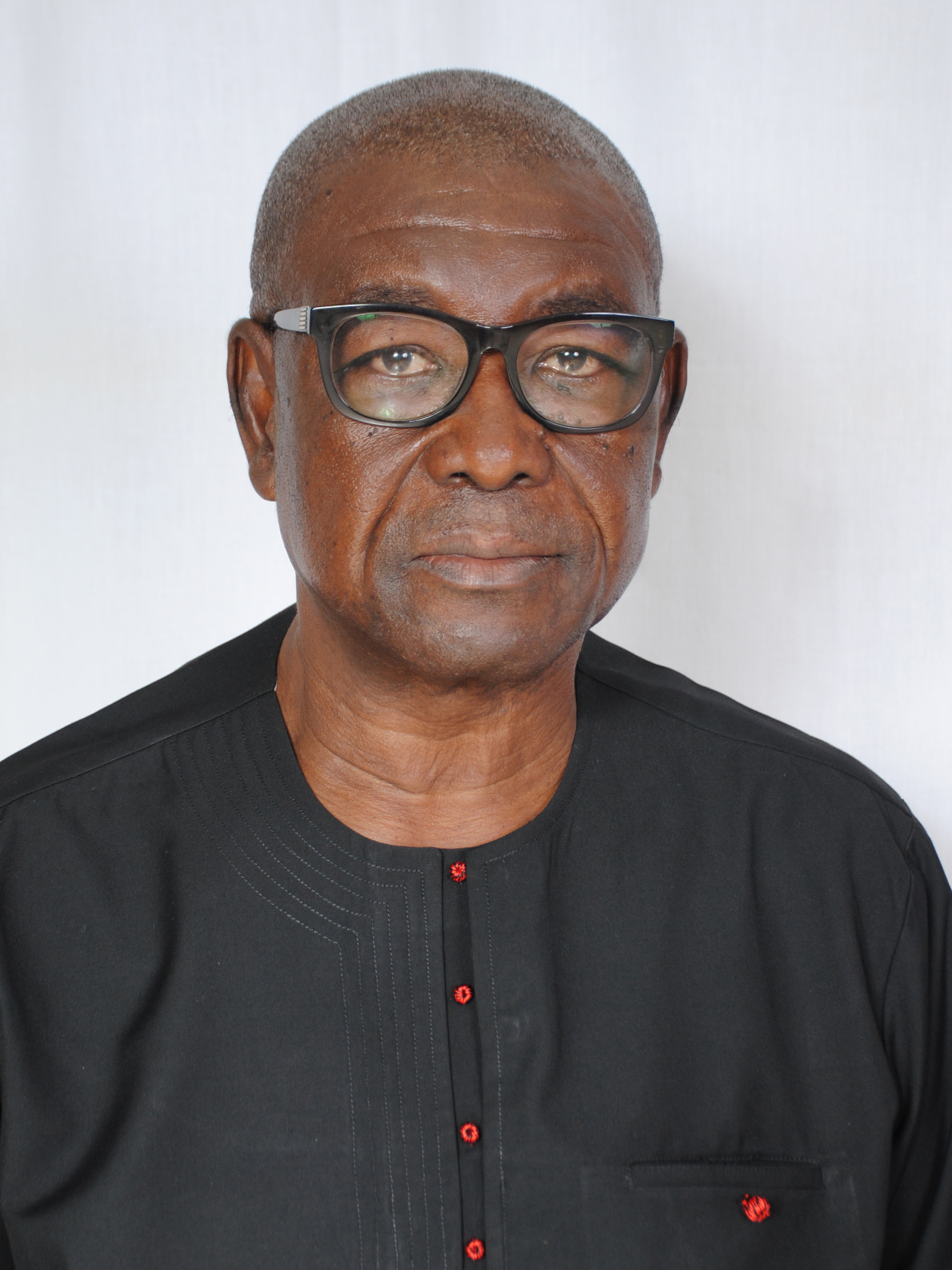

Member of the Ghana Parliament for Talensi
- Incumbent
- Assumed office 7 January 2021

Personal details
- Born: Benson Tongo Baba; 23 September 1948 (age 77) Bugubelle
- Party: National Democratic Congress
- Occupation: Politician
- Committees: Poverty Reduction Strategy Committee, Youth, Sports and Culture Committee, Defence and Interior Committee

Benson Tongo Baba (born 23 September 1948) is a Ghanaian politician and member of the Seventh Parliament of the Fourth Republic of Ghana representing the Talensi Constituency in the Upper East Region on the ticket of the National Democratic Congress.

== Early life and education ==
Benson hails from Tengzuk-Tongo. He holds a teacher’s Cert A from the Pusiga Training College and University of Education Winneba.

== Personal life ==
He is a christian.

== Politics ==
Hon. Benson Tongo Baba is a member of National Democratic Congress and a member parliament for Talensi constituency in the Upper East Region of Ghana in the Seventh and Eighth Parliament of the Fourth Republic of Ghana.

=== 2016 election ===
Hon. Tongo Baba contested the Talensi (Ghana parliament constituency) parliamentary seat on the ticket of National Democratic Congress during the 2016 Ghanaian general election and won with 12,874 representing 41.68% of the total votes. He won the parliamentary seat over Michael Wombeogo of PNC, Mr Wuni Thomas Pearson Duanab zaŋ of New Patriotic Party (NPP), Ayam John Bosco of Progressive People's Party (PPP) and Clinton Nambuligyin Bukari of Convention People's Party. They obtained 9,200 votes, 8,382 votes, 248 votes and 187 votes respectively. These is equivalent to 29.78%, 27.15%, 0.80% and 0.61% of the total votes respectively.

==== 2020 election ====
Benson Tongo Baba was re-elected as a member of parliament for Talensi constituency in the Upper East Region with 16,651 votes representing 45.65% of the total votes on the ticket of National Democratic Congress. He was elected over Thomas Pearson Duanab Wuni of New Patriotic Party who pulled 13,033 votes which is equivalent to 35.73% and the parliamentary candidate for PNC Michael Wombeogo had 6,971 votes representing 18.62% of the total votes.
