= Kofi Brako =

Ghanaian politician

Member of the Ghana Parliament for Tema Central Constituency
- Incumbent
- Assumed office 7 January 2013
- Preceded by: New

Personal details
- Born: 11 September 1959 (age 66)
- Party: New Patriotic Party

Kofi Brako (born 11 September 1959) is a Ghanaian politician and member of the Seventh Parliament of the Fourth Republic of Ghana representing the Tema Central Constituency in the Greater Accra Region on the ticket of the New Patriotic Party.

== Early life and education ==
Brako was born on 11 September 1959. He hails from Akyem Bieni in the Eastern Region of Ghana. He obtained his Diploma in Freight Forwarding from Zürich, Switzerland in 2013.

== Career ==
Prior to entering politics, Brako was the chief executive officer of Teamwork Freight Services in Tema.

== Politics ==
Brako entered parliament on 7 January 2013 on the ticket of the New Patriotic Party representing the Tema Central Constituency. Out of the 41,581 valid votes cast, he polled 28,334 votes (68.31%%) to win the seat. He was re-elected in 2016 to remain in parliament for another four (4)-year term.

In parliament, he has served on various committees, some of which include; the Roads and Transport Committee, the Gender and Children Committee, and the Youth, Sports and Culture Committee.

== Personal life ==
Brako is married with four children. He identifies as a Christian and a member of the Church of Jesus Christ of Latter-day Saints. He completed takoradi senior high school in 1977(tadisco)
