= Theresa Amerley Tagoe =

Ghanaian politician (1943–2010)

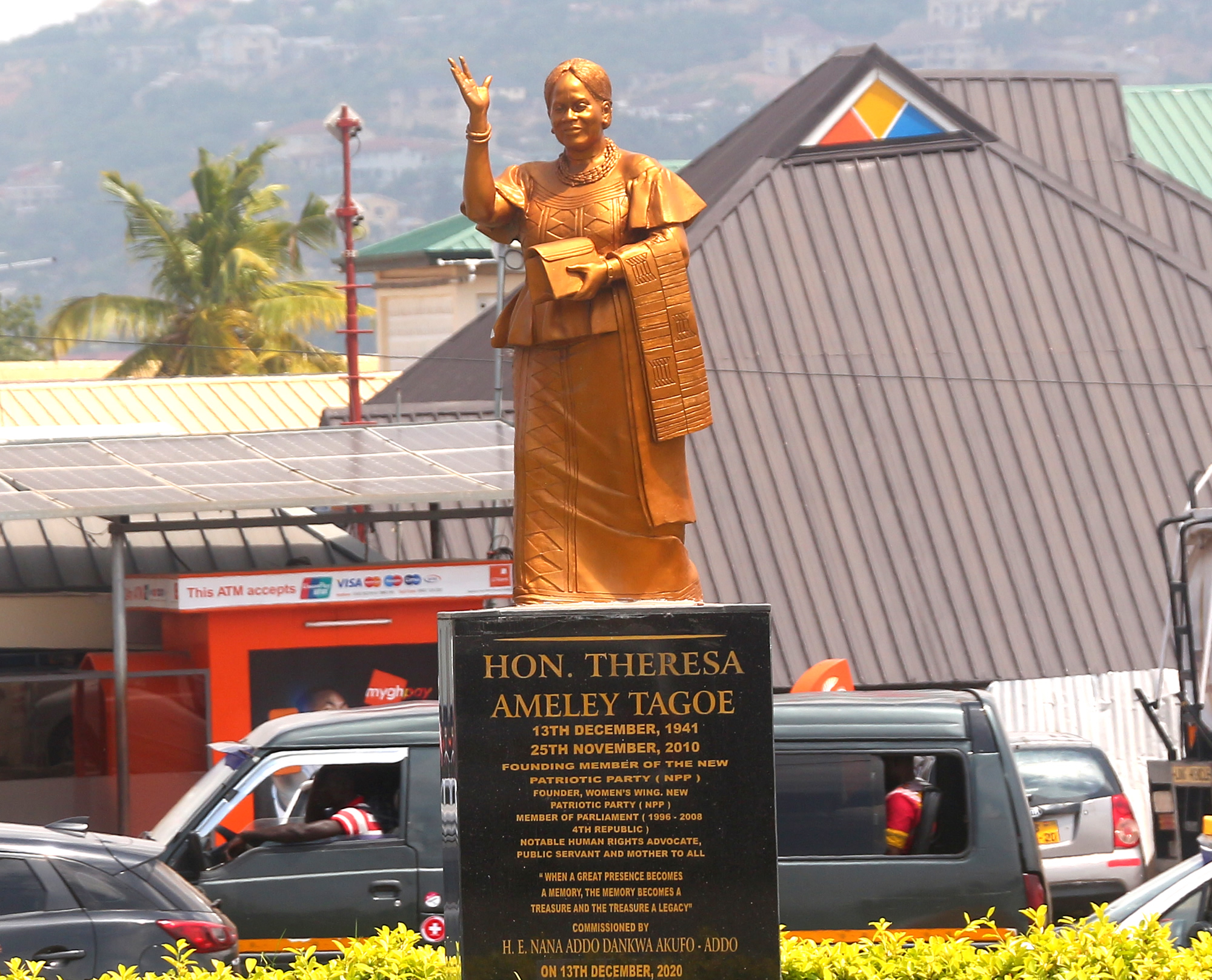

Member of the Ghana Parliament for Ablekuma North
- In office 7 January 1997 – 6 January 2001
- President: Jerry John Rawlings

Deputy Minister of Works and Housing
- President: John Kufuor

Deputy Minister for Greater Accra Region
- President: John Kufuor

Deputy Minister Ministry of lands and Forestry
- President: John Kufuor

Personal details
- Born: Theresah Amerley Tagoe; December 13, 1943
- Died: November 25, 2010 (aged 66) Accra, Ghana
- Spouse: Married
- Occupation: Politician

Theresa Amerley Tagoe (born on December 13, 1943 – November 25, 2010) also known as Iron Lady was a Ghanaian female politician and a leading member of the New Patriotic Party and a former Member of Parliament of the Ablekuma South Constituency.

== Early life ==
Tagoe, of the Ga people, was born on 13 December 1943.

== Education ==
Tagoe had her secondary education at Aburi Girls Senior High School where she was the school prefect. She obtained a bachelor's degree in French from the University of Ghana.

== Philanthropy ==
Tagoe owned a girls' secretarial school that included French in its curriculum, as well as starting charitable programs including one to help orphaned and street girls learn productive trades and a micro-credit loan program for women marketing dried fish on the streets of Accra.

== Political career ==
Theresa Tagoe was also the deputy Greater Accra Regional Minister and deputy Minister of Lands, Forestry and Mines under the erstwhile John Kufuor's administration.

Tagoe was also one time national women's organizer of the New Patriotic Party.

She was elected into parliament on 7 January 1997 after emerging winner at the 1996 Ghanaian General Elections. She obtained 39.90% of the total votes cast which is equivalent to 47,644 votes by defeating Ebo Hawkson of the National Democratic Congress who obtained 35.70% which is equivalent to 42,568 votes

== Legacy ==
Tagoe served as a member of Council of State and was a lifelong member of the Council of Women World Leaders. The Dansoman Roundabout was named after her known as the 'Theresa Ameley Tagoe Roundabout' and a statue was raised to honor her.

== Personal life ==
Theresa Tagoe had two sons.
