= Nelson Kofi Djabab =

Ghanaian politician

Nelson Kofi Djabab MP

Member of Parliament for Krachi East
- Incumbent
- Assumed office January 2025

Personal details
- Born: February 24, 1974 (age 52) Pai-Katanga, Ghana
- Party: National Democratic Congress
- Education: Ghana Communication Technology University, University of Ghana, Dambai College of Education
- Occupation: Politician, educator, logistics professional

Nelson Kofi Djabab (born 24 February 1974) is a Ghanaian politician and educator. He was elected as the Member of Parliament for the Krachi East Constituency in the 2024 Ghanaian general election on the ticket of the National Democratic Congress (NDC).

== Early life and education ==
Djabab hails from Pai-Katanga in the Oti Region of Ghana. He obtained his Senior Secondary School Certificate Examination (SSCE) at Kadjebi Asato Secondary School in 1995. He earned a Teachers' Certificate A from Dambai College of Education in 2000.

He continued his studies at the University of Ghana, obtaining a Diploma in 2005 and a Bachelor of Arts degree in Information Studies and History in 2008. He later completed a Master of Science degree in logistics from Ghana Communication Technology University in August 2014.

== Career ==
Djabab has worked across the education, logistics, and finance sectors. He began his professional career as a teacher with the Ghana Education Service, later serving as Shipping Manager at Ghana Supply Company Limited, and subsequently as managing director of GC Microcredit. In 2024, he contested the general election on the ticket of the National Democratic Congress (NDC) and was elected as the Member of Parliament for Krachi East, marking his first term in Parliament. He serves on the Information and Communications Committee and the Standing Orders Committee.

== See also ==
- List of MPs elected in the 2024 Ghanaian general election
- Parliament of Ghana
