= Ben Abdallah Banda =

Ghanaian politician

Member of the Ghana Parliament for Offinso South

Personal details
- Born: August 15, 1971 (age 55)
- Party: New Patriotic Party
- Education: University of Ghana

Ben Abdallah Banda (born August 15, 1971) is a Ghanaian politician and member of the Seventh Parliament of the Fourth Republic of Ghana representing the Offinso South Constituency in the Ashanti Region on the ticket of the New Patriotic Party.

== Early life and education ==
Banda was born on August 15, 1971. He hails from Abofour-Offinso a town in the Ashanti Region of Ghana. He obtained his bachelor's degree in law from the University of Ghana in 1998. He also earned a bachelor of law degree from the Ghana School of Law in 2000.

== Politics ==
Banda is a Ghanaian politician and a member of the Fifth Parliament of the Fourth Republic of Ghana representing the Offinso South Constituency in the Ashanti region of Ghana on the ticket of the New Patriotic Party. He served as a Member of Parliament for the Offinso South Constituency for three consecutive terms from 2009 to 2021.

He was the chairperson of the Judiciary Committee. He also served as the chairperson of the Constitutional, Legal and Parliamentary Affairs Committee and a member of the Subsidiary Legislation Committee.

== Employment ==
Banda is a lawyer. He is a partner at Obeng Manu Law Firm, Kumasi. On June 30, 2021 President Akufo-Addo named Ben Abdallah Banda as the Presidential Coordinator for the Zongo Development Fund, underscoring his commitment to the advancement of Zongo communities in Ghana.

On February 15, 2023, he was appointed as the Chairman of the Hajj Board by President Akufo-Addo following the reconstitution of the previous board. This appointment is to ensure the seamless execution of the Hajj pilgrimage.

== Personal life ==
Banda is Muslim. He is married with three children.
