= Donald Dari Soditey =

Ghanaian politician

Hon. Donald Dari Soditey

Member of Parliament
- In office January 2005 – 2008
- President: John Kufuor
- Preceded by: Joseph Trumah Bayel
- Constituency: Sawla/Tuna/Kalba

Member of Parliament
- In office 7 January 2009 – 6 January 2013
- President: John Atta Mills
- Constituency: Sawla/Tuna/Kalba
- Majority: NDC

Personal details
- Born: 25 September 1957 (age 69)
- Party: National Democratic Congress
- Children: 8
- Education: University of Education, Winneba
- Occupation: Teacher

Donald Dari Soditey (born September 25, 1957) is a Ghanaian politician and member of the Sixth Parliament of the Fourth Republic of Ghana representing the Sawla/Tuna/Kalba Constituency in the Northern Region on the ticket of the National Democratic Congress.

== Early life and education ==
Soditey was born on September 25, 1957. He hails from Carpenteryir - Sawla, a town in the Northern Region of Ghana. He earned a teachers' certificate in 1990. He also studied for a Diploma in Education at the University of Education, Winneba.

== Career ==
Donald was a Principal Superintendent and a Headteacher as Belma Primary School. He has been a Member of Parliament from January 2005. He is an educationist and a teacher as well.

== Politics ==
Soditey is a member of the National Democratic Congress (NDC). In the 2008 Ghanaian general elections, he was elected as the Member of Parliament for the Sawla/Tuna/Kalba constituency for the 5th parliament of the 4th republic. He was elected with 12,290 out of 21,050 of total valid votes cast, equivalent to 58.38% of total valid votes cast. He was elected over Joseph Hongiri Naah Vugu of the New Patriotic Party, Yaapuo Edward Kwabena of the People's National Convention, Gilbieri Jonathan Laamiitey of the Democratic Freedom Party and Abdulai A Wahid of the Convention People's Party. These obtained 38.33%, 1.49%, 0.67% and 1.13% respectively of total valid votes cast. In 2012, he contested for the Sawla/Tuna/Kalba seat on the ticket of the NDC for the Member of parliament of the sixth parliament of the fourth republic and won.

== Personal life ==
Soditey is a Christian (Catholic). He is married with eight children.
