= Francis Bawaana Dakura =

Ghanaian politician

Member of the Ghana Parliament for Jirapa Constituency

Personal details
- Born: 17 October 1961 (age 64)
- Party: National Democratic Congress

Francis Bawaana Dakura (born 17 October 1961) is a Ghanaian politician and member of the Seventh Parliament of the Fourth Republic of Ghana representing the Jirapa Constituency in the Upper West Region on the ticket of the National Democratic Congress.

== Education ==
He graduated from the University of St. Andrews in Fife, Scotland, with a Ph.D. and an M.LITT Masters degree. Additionally, he holds a Master's degree from the University of London Goldsmiths College, a B.A. with honors from Havering College in the United Kingdom, and a Diploma from the Institute of Social Sciences. The Chartered Institute of Secretaries and Administrators' CISA Finals are held in the UK.

== Politics ==
Dakura was the member of parliament for Jirapa (Ghana parliament constituency) in the Upper West Region of Ghana in the seventh parliament of the fourth republic of Ghana. He contested the 2016 Ghanaian general election on the ticket of National Democratic Congress and won the Jirapa parliamentary seat with 15,390 votes which is equivalent to 59.29% of the total votes. He won the election over Paul Derigubaa of IND who polled 8,249 votes representing 31.78%, New patriotic party parliamentary candidate Kpieta Jesse Sung had 2,071 votes representing 7.98%, the parliamentary candidate of Convention people's party Bagbulo Joseph who polled 90 votes which is equivalent to 0.35%, Kaawaasan Petter of GCPP had 89 votes representing 0.34% and APC parliamentary candidate Paalee Jacqueline had 70 votes representing 0.27% of the total votes.
