= Boniface Gambila Adagbila =

Ghanaian politician

Boniface Gambila Adagbila (born 9 June 1959) is a Ghanaian politician and member of the Sixth Parliament of the Fourth Republic of Ghana representing the Nabdam Constituency in the Upper East Region on the ticket of the New Patriotic Party.

== Personal life ==
Adagbila is married with three children. He is a Catholic.

== Early life and education ==
Adagbila was born on 9 June 1959. He hails from Damolg-Tindongo, a town in the Upper East Region of Ghana. He entered the University of Ghana and obtained his master's degree in Psychology and Political Science in 1986. He also attended the University of Manchester and obtained a postgraduate diploma in Human Resource Training and Development in 1992.

== Politics ==
Adagbila is a member of the New Patriotic Party (NPP). In 2012, he contested for the Nabdam seat on the ticket of the NPP sixth parliament of the fourth republic and won.

== Employment ==
- Manager/administrator
- Human resource practitioner
- Executive Director of National Service Scheme, 2002–2005
- Upper East Regional Minister, 2005–2007
- Principal Trainer (BSMP & PTUA), VRA Accra
