= Sagre Bambangi =

Ghanaian politician

Member of the Ghana Parliament for Walewale Constituency

Personal details
- Born: May 2, 1966 (age 60)
- Party: New Patriotic Party

Sagre Bambangi (born May 2, 1966) is a Ghanaian politician and member of the Seventh Parliament of the Fourth Republic of Ghana representing the Walewale Constituency in the Northern Region on the ticket of the New Patriotic Party.

== Personal life ==
Bambangi is a Muslim. He is married, with six children.

== Early life and education ==
Bambangi was born on May 2, 1966. He hails from Wungu, a town in the Northern Region of Ghana. He attended Navrongo Senior High School and obtained SC/GCE O level and GCE A level. He entered University of Ghana and obtained his Doctor of Philosophy degree in Agricultural Economics in 2009. He was a lecturer at the University for Development Studies from 1997 to 2016.

== Politics ==
Bambangi is a member of the New Patriotic Party (NPP). In 2012, he contested for the Walewale seat on the ticket of the NPP sixth parliament of the fourth republic and won.

== Employment ==
Bambangi is a lecturer in economics at the University for Development Studies - Wa Campus.

He has been a member of the Parliament since January 7, 2013; he is in his second term.
