= Bright Edward Kodzo Demordzi =

Ghanaian politician

Bright Edward Kodzo Demordzi (born 18 December 1972) is a Ghanaian politician and member of the Sixth Parliament of the Fourth Republic of Ghana representing the Bortianor/Ngleshie/Amanfro (new) Constituency in the Greater Accra Region on the ticket of the National Democratic Congress.

== Personal life ==
Demordzi is a Christian (Overcomers Praise Assembly International). He is married with three children.

== Early life and education ==
Demordzi was born on 18 December 1972. He hails from Anloga, a town in the Volta Region of Ghana. He entered Ghana Institute of Management and Public Administration and obtained his Master of Business Administration degree's in Marketing in 2009. He also attended Chartered Institute of Marketing (CIM UK) and obtained his professional postgraduate diploma in 2009.

== Politics ==
Demordzi is a member of the National Democratic Congress (NDC). In 2012, he contested for the Bortianor/Ngleshie/Amanfro (new) seat on the ticket of the NDC sixth parliament of the fourth republic and won.

== Employment ==
- Commercial Manager, Yara (Ghana), Limited, Airport - Accra
- PR/journalist/sdvertiser/marketer
