= Paul Derigubah =

Ghanaian politician

Paul Derigubah (born April 23, 1963) is a Ghanaian politician and member of the Sixth Parliament of the Fourth Republic of Ghana representing the Jirapa Constituency in the Upper West Region as an independent.

== Personal life ==
Derigubah is a Christian (Catholic). He is married (with six children).

== Early life and education ==
Derigubah was born on April 23, 1963. He hails from Jirapa, a town in the Upper West Region of Ghana. He entered Agriculture University of, Wageningen, Netherlands and obtained his master's degree in Agriculture in 1985.

== Politics ==
Derigubah is an independent. In 2012, he contested for the Jirapa seat in the sixth parliament of the fourth republic and won.

== Employment ==
- Programme Specialist, United Nations Development Programme, Accra
- Farmer/agriculturist
