= Kofi Okyere-Agyekum =

Ghanaian politician (born 1958)

Hon Kofi Okyere-Agyekum
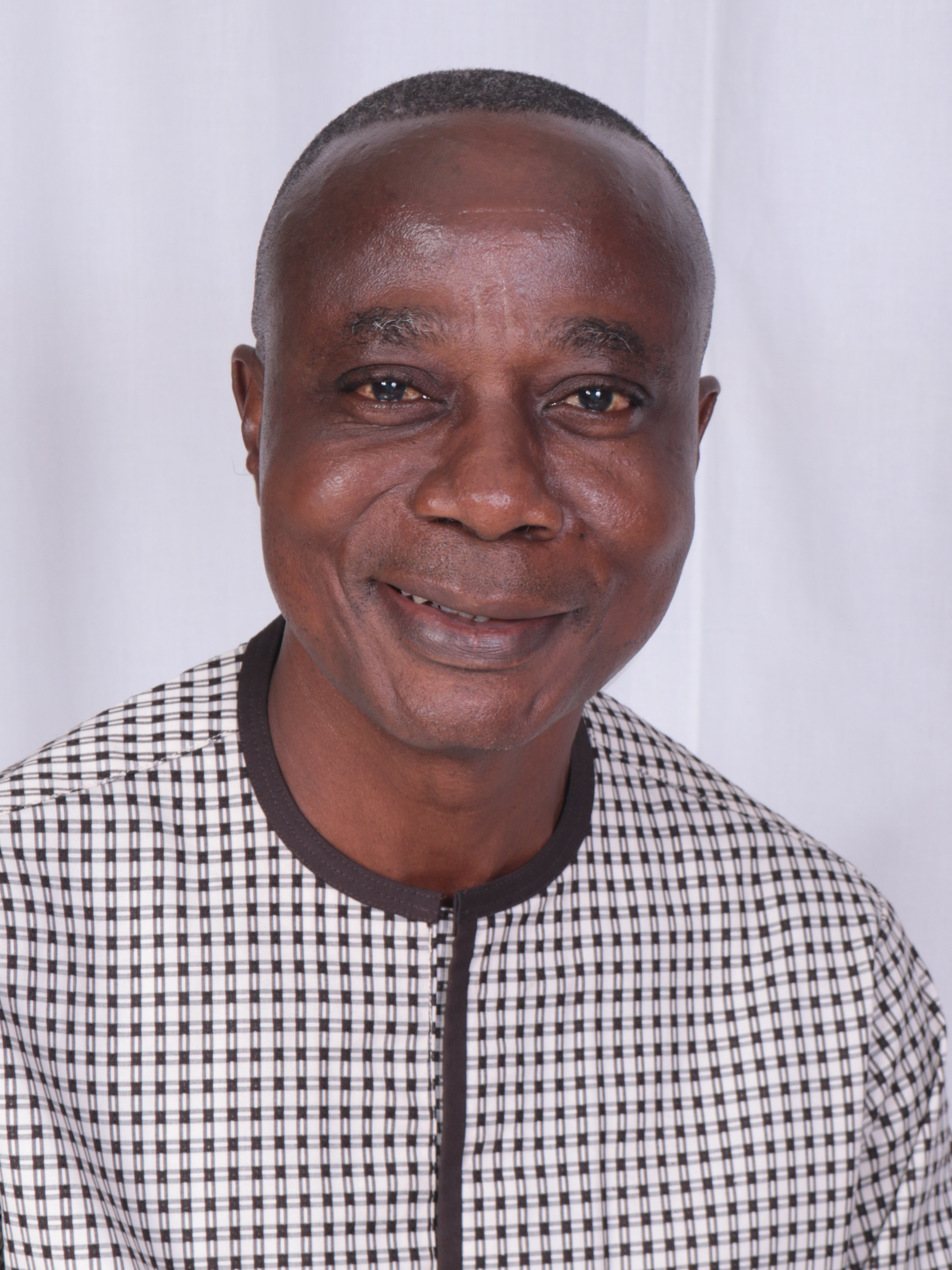

Member of the Ghana Parliament for Fanteakwa South Constituency
- Incumbent
- Assumed office 7 January 2021

Personal details
- Born: Kofi Okyere-Agyekum; 8 March 1958 (age 68) Osino
- Party: New Patriotic Party
- Education: University of Ghana
- Occupation: Politician
- Committees: Public Accounts Committee, Employment, Social Welfare and State Enterprises Committee, Lands and Forestry Committee

Kofi Okyere-Agyekum (born 8 March 1958) is a Ghanaian politician and member of the Seventh Parliament of the Fourth Republic of Ghana representing the Fanteakwa South Constituency in the Eastern Region on the ticket of the New Patriotic Party.

== Early life and education ==
Okyere-Agyekum was born on 8 March 1958. He hails from Osino, a town in the Eastern Region of Ghana. He entered the University of Ghana and obtained his Bachelor of Science degree in agricultural economics in 1981. He also attended Ghana Institute of Management and Public Administration and obtained a Master's of Business Administration degree in finance in 2007.

== Politics ==
Okyere-Agyekum is a member of the New Patriotic Party (NPP). In 2012, he contested for the Fanteakwa South seat on the ticket of the NPP sixth parliament of the fourth republic and won. He again represent the constituency in the Seventh and Eighth Parliament of the Fourth Republic of Ghana.

=== 2016 election ===
Agyekum contested the Fanteakwa South constituency parliamentary seat on the ticket of the New Patriotic Party during the 2016 Ghanaian general election and won with 11,274 votes representing 60.79% of the total votes. He was elected over Abigail Elorm Akwambea Mensah of the National Democratic Congress, Godfried Mark Dankwah Nyarko of the PPP, Danso Okra Daniel (IND) and Kwablah Isaac Tetteh of the Convention People's Party. They obtained 5,726 votes, 1,256 votes, 223 votes and 66 votes respectively, equivalent to 30.88%, 6.77%, 1.20% and 0.36% of the total votes respectively.

==== 2020 election ====
Agyekum was again elected as a member of parliament for Fanteakwa South (Ghana parliament constituency) on the ticket of the New Patriotic Party during the 2020 Ghanaian general election. He won the election with 10,565 votes representing 49.09% over Gyan Stephen Ayisi (IND) who polled 5,775 votes which is equivalent to 26.83% and parliamentary candidate for the National Democratic Congress Richard Fred Kwashie Junior had 5,181 votes representing 24.07% of the total votes.

== Employment ==
- Corporate manager, Uniliver, 1984–2000
- Supply chain manager, Cleansing Solution Limited, Tema
- Member of Parliament (January 7, 2013–present; 2nd term)

== Personal life ==
Okyere-Agyekum is a Christian (Presbyterian). He is married (with three children).
