= Fritz Baffour =

Ghanaian journalist and politician

Hon Fritz Baffour

Member of the Ghana Parliament for Ablekuma South
- In office Jan 2009 – Jan 2017
- Preceded by: Theresa Amerley Tagoe
- Succeeded by: Alfred Vanderpuije
- Majority: 5,283

Minister for Information
- In office Jan 2012 – Dec 2012
- President: John Atta Mills
- Preceded by: John Tia

Personal details
- Born: 11 March 1952 (age 74) Accra, Ghana
- Relations: R. P. Baffour
- Profession: Journalist, media consultant

Fritz Baffour (born 11 March 1952) is a Ghanaian journalist, politician and communications consultant. He was the Member of Parliament for Ablekuma South constituency in the Parliament of Ghana and the Minister for Information during the Mills Administration.

== Early life and education ==
Baffour was born on 11 March 1952 in Korle Gonno in Accra, the capital of Ghana. His father was R. P. Baffour, an academician and one of the first Ghanaian mechanical engineers as well as the first Ghanaian Vice Chancellor of the Kwame Nkrumah University of Science and Technology. His mother was a midwife. His secondary education was at the Prempeh College and the Technology Secondary School, both in Kumasi in the Ashanti Region of Ghana. He obtained his GCE Ordinary Level certificate in 1968. His sixth form education was at the City of Bath College in Somerset in the United Kingdom between 1972 and 1974, completing with the GCE Advanced Level certificate. Baffour also attended the Bristol Polytechnic between 1974 and 1976. Fritz Baffour did a master's degree in Communication Studies from the Leicester University between 2007 and 2012.

== Career ==
Baffour worked as a journalist. He was a producer with Ghana Television, the TV channel of the state owned Ghana Broadcasting Corporation as a producer and director. He has also worked with Liberian Television, Nigerian Television, Tyne Tees TV UK, Diverse Production in UK and Back to Back Productions USA. He was also a media consultant to the government of Jerry Rawlings.

Hon. Baffour is an entertainer known for his comedy skills. He has audiences in West Africa and beyond. While known for his natural sense of humor, he also maintains a serious demeanor. His managerial skills and leadership qualities have earned him appointments to the boards and governing councils of various corporate organizations, both domestically and internationally.

== Politics ==
Baffour was involved with the National Democratic Congress from its inception in 1991. He became a member of parliament in January 2009 after winning the Ablekuma South seat in the Ghanaian parliamentary election in 2008. He was appointed Minister for information by President John Atta Mills in 2012.

== See also ==
- List of Mills government ministers
- National Democratic Congress
- Ablekuma South constituency

Parliament of Ghana
Preceded by Theresa Tagoe	Member of Parliament for Ablekuma South; 2009–2016
Political offices
Preceded by John Tia	Minister for Information; 2012–2013
