= Ablekuma South =

Ghana parliament constituency

- constituency for the Parliament of Ghana
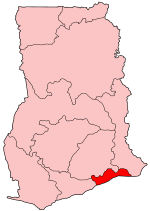
- District: Accra Metropolis District
- Region: Greater Accra Region of Ghana

Current constituency
- Party: National Democratic Congress
- MP: Dr.Alfred Okoe Vanderpuije

Ablekuma South is one of the constituencies represented in the Parliament of Ghana. It elects one Member of Parliament (MP) by the first past the post system of election. Ablekuma South is located in the Accra Metropolitan Area of the Greater Accra Region of Ghana. It is one of the three sub metropolitan district councils of Accra Metropolitan Assembly.

== History ==
Accra has been Ghana's capital when it was transferred from Cape Coast since the year 1877. Currently, it was one of the growing and populated Metropolis in Africa with annual growth rate of 3.1%. Firstly, it was attempted to set up a Town Council back in 1859 under an Ordinance, which was nullified in the January 1861. However, the Accra Town Council was formally established in 1898 under the Town Council Ordinance 1894.

== Boundaries ==
The seat is located entirely within the Accra Metropolitan Area of the Greater Accra Region of Ghana. It shares boundaries with Ablekuma North, Ashiedu Keteke and Ablekuma Central. The boundary from its current office location moves through the Kpakpo Oti road Intersection to Ring Road West, from there it moves eastwards to Lartebiokorshie Intersection and turns left from Lartebiokorshie road to Link road intersection to Chemu road. Then from Sempe Traffic Light Street through Mampong Stream to Oblogo road, then from Oblogo of Mars road intersection. From Mars road intersection to Dansoman roundabout. From Dansoman main road to Poultry farm Avenue to Dansoman High Street through to SSNIT flats and back to Otorjor, Opetekwei, Gbegbeyise and Shaibu Communities.

== Members of Parliament ==
Election	Member	Party
1992	Quannor Metel	National Democratic Congress
1996	Theresa Ameley Tagoe	New Patriotic Party
2008	Fritz Baffour	National Democratic Congress
2016	Dr. Alfred Okoe Vanderpuije	National Democratic Congress

== Elections ==
2008 Ghanaian parliamentary election: Ablekuma South Sources:MyJoyOnline / Ghana Home Page
Party	Candidate	Votes	%	±%
National Democratic Congress	Fritz Baffour	56,162	51.3	—
New Patriotic Party	Francis Kojo Smith	50,879	46.5	—
People's National Convention	Godfred Agyemang Kennedy	915	0.8	—
Convention People's Party	Apostle Veronica Quartey	837	0.8	—
Democratic Freedom Party	Jonathan Nii Odotei Quarcoo	315	0.3	—
Independent	John Kabutey Tettegah	313	0.3	—
Democratic People's Party	Goodman Baah	90	0.1	—
Majority		5,823	4.8	—
Turnout				—

== Economic Achievements ==
Ablekuma South has contributed to the economic development of Accra in Ghana. Fishing and fish mongering activities are the dominant activities in Ablekuma South because of majority of its communities are found along the coast line. Business entities such as banks, supermarkets, hotels, educational institutions, and fuel stations among others can be found in Ablekuma South.

== Mission ==
The mission of Ablekuma South is to Improve the Quality of Life within the City of Accra by Providing Leadership and Opportunities for Social and Economic Development Whilst Maintaining a Clean, Attractive and Secured Environment.

== Vision ==
The vision of Ablekuma South is A Smart, Sustainable, Resilient City.

== See also ==
- List of Ghana Parliament constituencies
