= Krachi East (Ghana parliament constituency) =

Constituency in Ghana

- constituency for the Parliament of Ghana
- District: Krachi East District
- Region: Oti Region of Ghana

Current constituency
- Created: 2004
- Party: National Democratic Congress
- MP: Nelson Kofi Djabab

Krachi East is one of the constituencies represented in the Parliament of Ghana. It elects one Member of Parliament (MP) by the first past the post system of election. Nelson Kofi Djabab is the member of parliament for the constituency. Krachi East is located in the Krachi East district of the Oti Region of Ghana.

== Boundaries ==
The seat is located within the Krachi East District of the Volta Region of Ghana. The constituency was originally located within the Volta Region of Ghana until new Regions were created following the December 2018 referendum.

== History ==
The constituency was first created in 2004 by the Electoral Commission of Ghana along with 29 other new ones, increasing the number of constituencies from 200 to 230. This seat was created prior to the Ghanaian parliamentary election in 2004 when the Krachi constituency was split into the Krachi East and the Krachi West constituencies respectively.

== Members of Parliament ==
Election	Member	Party
2004	Constituency created	
2004	Wisdom Gidisu	National Democratic Congress
2016	Michael Yaw Gyato	New Patriotic Party
2024	Nelson Kofi Djabab	National Democratic Congress

== Elections ==
2012 Ghanaian parliamentary election: Krachi East Source:GhanaWeb
Party	Candidate	Votes	%	±%
National Democratic Congress	Wisdom Gidisu	13,493	43.92	−12.98
New Patriotic Party	Patrick Charty Jilimah	10,405	33.87	−4.23
Independent	Yao Gago	5,797	18.87	—
Progressive People's Party	Boateng Kofi Emmanuel	795	2.59	—
Independent	Emmanuel Kwasi Annor	156	0.51	—
National Democratic Party	Lawson Apreko	73	0.24	—
Majority		3,088	10.05	−8.75
Turnout		30,719		—

National Democratic Party

2008 Ghanaian parliamentary election: Krachi East Source:GhanaWeb
Party	Candidate	Votes	%	±%
National Democratic Congress	Wisdom Gidisu	12,340	56.9	−13.2
New Patriotic Party	Patrick Charty Jilimah	8,263	38.1	+8.2
Convention People's Party	Boateng Kofi Emmanuel	947	4.4	—
Democratic Freedom Party	Joseph Kwaku Asiedu	146	0.7	—
Majority		4,077	18.8	−21.4
Turnout				—

2004 Ghanaian parliamentary election:Krachi East Source:Ghana Home Page
Party	Candidate	Votes	%	±%
National Democratic Congress	Wisdom Gidisu	14,652	70.1	N/A
New Patriotic Party	John Gyamfi	6,261	29.9	N/A
Majority		8,391	40.2	N/A

== See also ==
- List of Ghana Parliament constituencies
