= Samuel Ato Amoah =

Ghanaian politician

Member of the Ghana Parliament for Twifo Atti Morkwaa
- In office 2012–2016

Personal details
- Born: 7 January 1966 (age 60)
- Party: National Democratic Congress
- Education: University of Cape Coast

Samuel Ato Amoah (born 7 January 1966) is a former member of the Sixth Parliament of the Fourth Republic of Ghana. He represented the Twifo Atti Morkwaa in the Central Region of Ghana,

== Personal life ==
Amoah is married with four children. He is a Christian who fellowships at the Seventh Day Adventist. He is a successful entrepreneur with ventures in the pharmaceutical, education, and radio broadcasting sectors. He is the CEO of SweetFM 106.5, a radio station located in Twifo Praso.

== Early life and education ==
Amoah was born on 7 January 1966 in Twifo Nyinase in the Central Region of Ghana.

He attended the University of Cape Coast and graduated with a bachelor's degree in Business Administration in 2009.

== Politics ==
Amoah is a member of National Democratic Congress (NDC). He contested in the 2012 Ghanaian elections under the ticket of NDC and won giving him the chance to represent the Twifo Atti Morkwaa constituency. He garnered 19,410 votes which represents 56.16% of the total valid votes and hence defeated the other contestants including Francis Owusu-Mensah, Ringo Gottah and Seth Kwame Ofori. In 2016, he contested in the general elections and lost to Abraham Dwuma Odoom; as a result, he could not represent his constituency for the second time.

== Employment ==
Amoah was the Regional Monitoring and Evaluation Officer of National Health Insurance Authority in Ho.
