= Godfrey Tangu Bayon =

Ghanaian politician

Hon. Godfrey Tangu Bayon

Member of Parliament for Wa East Constituency
- In office 7 January 2017 – 6 January 2021
- President: Nana Akufo-Addo
- Preceded by: Ameen Salifu

Member of Parliament for Wa East Constituency
- In office 7 January 2009 – 6 January 2013
- President: John Atta Mills; John Mahama
- Succeeded by: Ameen Salifu

Member of Parliament for Wa East Constituency
- In office 7 January 2005 – 6 January 2009
- President: John Kufuor
- Preceded by: Alhaji Issahaku Salia

Personal details
- Born: 3 March 1956 (age 70)
- Party: New Patriotic Party
- Children: 2
- Education: Gbewah Training College
- Profession: Educationist
- Committees: Poverty Reduction Strategy Committee - Chairperson Food, Agriculture and Cocoa Affairs Committee (7th Parliament of 4th Republic of Ghana)

Godfrey Tangu Bayon (born 1956) is a Ghanaian politician and member of the Seventh Parliament of the Fourth Republic of Ghana representing the Wa East Constituency in the Upper West Region on the ticket of the New Patriotic Party.

== Early life and education ==
Bayon was born on 3 March 1956. He hails from Ducie, a town in the Upper West Region of Ghana. He worked as teacher before joining politics in 2001. He obtained an A Level Certificate at Gbewah Training College in 1982. He also attended the Institute of Adult Education. Wa in 1973.

== Career ==
Bayon worked as a teacher at the Ghana Education Service from 1977 to 2000. He served as the headmaster Ducia Primary School. Bayon is a teacher by profession.

== Political career ==
Bayon is a member of the New Patriotic Party (NPP). He was the Wa District Chief Executive between 2001 and 2005. He was appointed Minister of States (Roads and Highways) under the government of the then President John Kufour between 2007 and 2008. He represented Wa East Constituency in the 4th, 5th and 7th Parliament of the 4th Republic of Ghana.

=== 2004 Elections ===
Bayon was elected as the member of parliament for the Wa East constituency in the 2004 Ghanaian general elections. He thus represented the constituency in the 4th parliament of the 4th republic of Ghana. He was elected with 10,947votes out of 21,307 total valid votes cast. This was equivalent to 51.4% of the total valid votes cast. He was elected over Albert Solomon Bawah Sulley of the People's National Convention and Saliah Issaku Alhaji of the National Democratic Congress. These obtained 1,085votes and 9,275votes out of the total valid votes cast. These were equivalent to 5.1% and 43.5% of the total valid votes cast. Bayon was elected on the ticket of the New Patriotic Party. In all the New Patriotic Party won a majority total of 194 parliamentary representation out of a total 230seats in the 4th parliament of the 4th republic of Ghana.

== Personal life ==
Bayon is a Christian(Baptist) and is married with two children.
