= Eyiah Kyei Baffour =

Ghanaian politician (born 1968)

Member of the Ghana Parliament for Lower West Akim Constituency

Personal details
- Born: 1 February 1968 (age 58)
- Party: New Patriotic Party
- Education: University of Ghana

Eyiah Kyei Baffour (born 1 February 1968) is a Ghanaian politician and member of the Seventh Parliament of the Fourth Republic of Ghana representing the Lower West Akim Constituency in the Eastern Region on the ticket of the New Patriotic Party.

== Education ==
He earned his CA from the Institute of Chartered Accountants, Ghana, his MBA from the University of Ghana, and his CTA from the Chartered Institute of Tax Accountants.

== Politics ==
Baffour is a member of New Patriotic Party and was the member of parliament for the Lower West Akim constituency in the Eastern Region in the Seventh Parliament of the Fourth Republic of Ghana.

=== 2016 election ===
Baffour contested the Lower West Akim (Ghana parliament constituency) parliamentary seat on the ticket of the New Patriotic Party during the 2016 Ghanaian general election and won the election with 27,056 votes, representing 59.87% of the total votes. He won the election over Naana Osei Ampem of the National Democratic Congress who polled 18,011 votes which is equivalent to 39.86%, and the parliamentary candidate for the Convention People's Party Muhammed Osman had 124 votes, representing 0.27% of the total votes.
