= Owusu Agyekum =

Ghanaian politician (born 1942)

MP for Birim North
- In office 7 January 1993 – 6 January 1997
- President: Jerry John Rawlings

Personal details
- Born: Birim North District, Eastern Region, Ghana
- Citizenship: Ghanaian
- Party: National Convention Party
- Education: London Institute of Neurology, Moscow First Medical School, Moscow Institute of Tropical Medicine
- Occupation: Politician
- Profession: Medical officer

Owusu Agyekum (born 29 November 1942) is a Ghanaian politician and a member of the First Parliament of the fourth Republic representing the Birim North constituency in Eastern Region of Ghana.

== Early life and education ==
Agyekum was born on 29 November 1942 at Birim North in the Eastern Region of Ghana. He attended the London Institute of Neurology, Moscow First Medical School land the Moscow Institute of Tropical Medicine and he studied Medicine and obtained his Doctor of Philosophy, Medical Degree and his CSIM respectively.

== Career ==
Agyekum is a physician by profession.

=== Politics ===
Agyekum was first elected into Parliament on the ticket of the National Convention Party for the Yilo Krobo Constituency in the Eastern Region of Ghana during the 1992 Ghanaian parliamentary election. He was defeated in the by Kweku Boateng-Lovinger of the National Democratic Congress who polled 20,737 votes out of the 100% valid votes cast representing 36.00% over his oppositions Owusu Agyekum of the Convention People's Party who polled 12,139 votes representing 21.10%, Victor Biscoff Owusu Ahinkorah of the New Patriotic Party who polled 11,306 votes representing 19.60%, Agyenim Boateng who polled 448 votes representing 0.80% and Alex Oduro-Ampadu who polled 0 vote representing 0.00%.

== Personal life ==
Agyekum is a Christian.
