= Alex Kofi Agyekum =

Ghanaian politician (born 1962)

Member of the Ghana Parliament for Mpohor Constituency

Personal details
- Born: 18 August 1962 (age 64)
- Party: New Patriotic Party
- Education: University of Cape Coast

Alex Kofi Agyekum (born 18 August 1962) is a Ghanaian politician and member of the Seventh Parliament of the Fourth Republic of Ghana representing the Mpohor constituency in the Western Region on the ticket of the New Patriotic Party.

== Early life and education ==
Agyekum was born on 18 August 1962. He obtained a BA degree from the University of Cape Coast, as well as an M.ED in Management and a diploma in Education.

== Career ==
Agyekum was a teaching and research assistant at University of Cape Coast from 1991 to 1992. He was the head of the department for economics in Holy Child School from 1993 to 2003, and was the assistant headmaster at Holy Child School from 2003 to 2013.

== Politics ==
Agyekum entered parliament on 7 January 2013 as a member of parliament for the Mpohor constituency on the ticket of the New Patriotic Party. He has remained in parliament, winning the subsequent elections (2012 and 2016) since 2012.

=== 2012 election ===
Agyekum contested the 2012 Ghanaian general election on the ticket of the New Patriotic Party and won the Mpohor parliamentary seat with 7,114 votes out of the total votes, equivalent to 40.43%. He won the election over the National Democratic Congress parliamentary candidate Anthony Bassaw, who polled 6,333 votes, representing 35.99%, while Mary Ankoman, the parliamentary candidate for the PPP, had 4, 151 votes, representing 23.59% of the total votes cast.

==== 2016 election ====
During the 2016 Ghanaian general election, Agyekum again contested the Mpohor parliamentary seat on the ticket of New Patriotic Party and won, therefore representing the constituency in the Parliament of Ghana for two consecutive terms (2012 and 2016). He won the election with 8,364 votes out of the total votes representing 48.72% over the National Democratic Congress parliamentary candidate Eric Kweku Kyeremah, who polled 6,947 votes which is equivalent to 40.46%, while Joseph Benedict Auby of the PPP had 1,857 votes, representing 10.82% of the total votes.

He was elected by parliament as the chairman of the youth, sports and culture committee to look into issues of the Ghana Football Association.

== Personal life ==
Agyekum is married, and has four children. He is a Christian and fellowships at Methodist.
