= Islamic University College, Ghana =

Private higher-education institution in Ghana

- Type: Private
- Established: 2000; 26 years ago
- Affiliations: University of Ghana; University of Education, Winneba (UEW); Al-Mustafa International University
- President: Hadi Kamal Ezzat
- Vice-president: Mohammadreza Taheri
- Location: East Legon, Adjringanor, Greater Accra Region, Ghana
- Website: www.iug.edu.gh

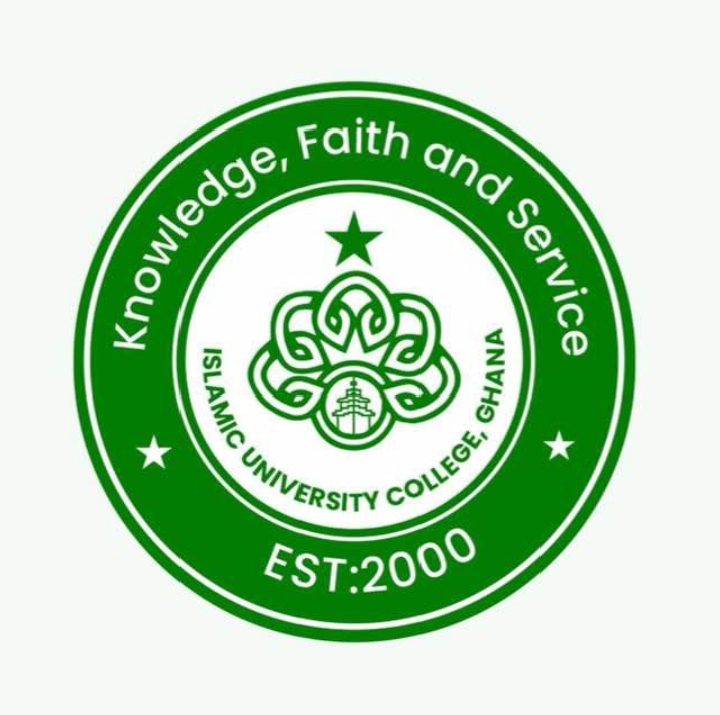
Islamic University College, Ghana

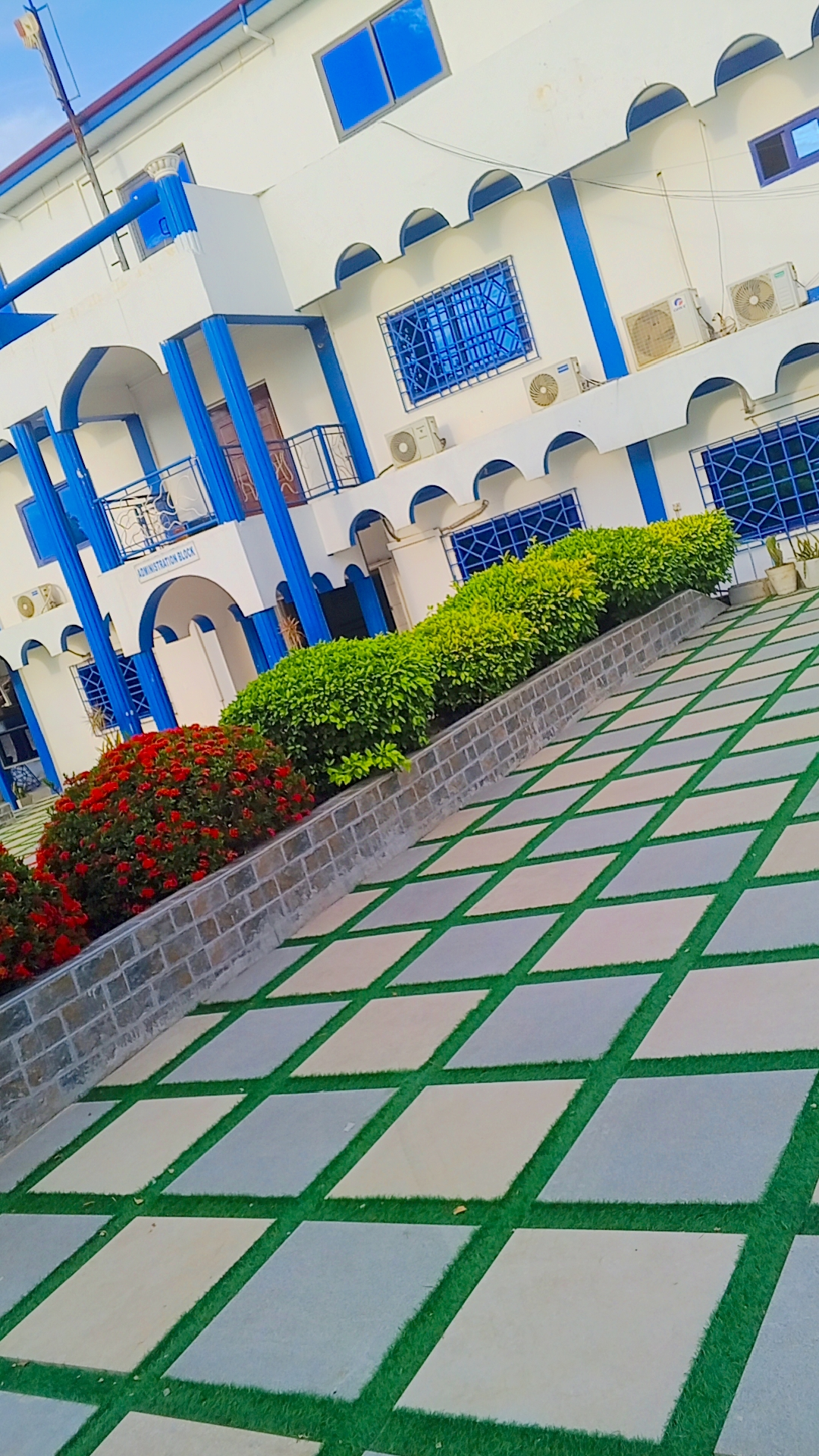
IUCG compound

The Islamic University College, Ghana is one of the private universities in Ghana. It is located at East Legon, Adjringanor in the Greater Accra Region. It was established in 2000 by Dr. Abdolmajid Hakimollahi. This was under the sponsorship of the Ahlul Bait Foundation of the Islamic Republic of Iran. It was granted accreditation provisionally in 2001 and finally in 2002.2002.

== Undergraduate programmes ==
=== Department of Business Administration ===
- BBA Accounting
- BBA Banking and Finance
- BBA Marketing
- BBA Human Resource Management

=== Department of Islamic Studies ===
- BA Religious Studies (Islamic Studies)
- MPhil Islamic Studies

=== Department of Communication Studies ===
- BA Communication Studies (Journalism)
- BA Communication Studies (Public Relations)
- BA Communication Studies (Advertisement)

=== Department of Education ===
- Bachelor of Education (Early Childhood Education)
- Diploma in Education (Early Childhood Education)

=== Department of Nursing ===
- BSc in Nursing (Critical Care Nursing)

== Graduate programmes ==
- MPhil Islamic Studies

== Affiliations ==
- University of Ghana, Legon
- University of Education, Winneba (UEW)
- Al Moustapha University, Iran

== Early History ==
The university was not built from scratch in 2000. The Ahlul-Bait Foundation ran an Islamic Training Institute in Abelenkpe, Accra, back in 1986. That became the Ahlul Bait Islamic School in 1988. The college only became a university later.

Mature students who are 25 or older have to take an entrance exam. The exam covers English, Math, and a general paper. After the exam, there is an interview. Some students with diplomas or HND certificates can skip to Level 200 or 300, but they still have to do an interview.

== Graduation ceremony ==
Early years The school took its first students in 2001. I think there were only 15 of them. They were all studying Religious Studies. The next batch came in September of that year, 42 more students. So the first graduation probably happened around 2005 or 2006, but I haven't found a news article about that yet.

== 2018 graduation ==
The 14th graduation was on April 28, 2018. According to GhanaWeb, 295 students got their degrees that day. There were 167 men and 128 women.

Some students got awards. Siisu Oldman Mohammed was best in Taxation. Ruhaina Issah was best in Business Administration. Sama-Madjaladjo Aziz Mohammed was best in Religious Studies.

== 2019 graduation ==
The next year, 2019, the school graduated 212 students. That number was 108 men and 104 women. The same event also welcomed 350 new students.

The president back then was Dr Mohsen Maarefi. He told the government they should create a fund to help private universities.

== 2022 graduation ==
This one was for the 2020/2021 academic year. It happened in March 2022. A total of 220 students graduated. The Ghanaian Times reported the numbers.

Out of those 220, 144 were male and 106 were female. For the programs: 103 studied Business, 94 studied Communication, and 23 studied Religious Studies.

Nine students got first class honours. Seventy-five got second class upper. One hundred and seventeen got second class lower. Nineteen got third class.

The awards went to Iddrisu Zakiyatu Dumah for overall best, Abukari Fatimata for best in Communication, and Mohammed Saeed Baba for best in Business.

== 2023 graduation ==
This graduation was on March 18, 2023. It was the 19th congregation. Two hundred and twenty-two students graduated: 113 men and 109 women.

Eighty-three studied Business, 71 studied Communication, 39 studied Religious Studies, and 29 studied Education.

== 22nd graduation ceremony ==
On June 13, 2026, Islamic University College Ghana (IUCG) held its 22nd graduation ceremony at the University forecourt on the theme: “Projecting into the Sciences in the IUCG’s Tertiary Education Opportunities.” The event marked a significant traditional milestone for the institution.

The Minister for Education, Hon. Haruna Iddrisu, graced the occasion as the Special Guest of Honour. In his address, he stressed the importance of students remaining truthful in every situation they may encounter, basing his remarks on the Hadith of the Holy Prophet.

Hon. Haruna Iddrisu also disclosed that the overall best student would benefit from a scholarship scheme he established in honour of his late mother. He further presented 10,000 Ghana cedis to the overall best student.

The keynote speaker, Prof. Masud Ibrahim an alumnus of IUCG, is currently an Associate Professor of Marketing and Management, and serves as the Head of the Department of Management Studies at the University of Skills Training and Entrepreneurial Development (USTED). He encouraged graduates to consider further studies after graduation and cautioned them not to assume that their education ends on the day of graduation.

Other dignitaries present included Dr. Ali Ghomashi, the Ambassador of Iran to Ghana, representatives of the Iranian Cultural Consulate, the President of IUCG and his Vice, representatives from the Vice-Chancellor’s office of the University of Ghana, and representatives from the University of Education, Winneba, as well as lawyers, chiefs, and parents.
