= Wisdom Gidisu =

Ghanaian politician

Hon. Wisdom Gidisu
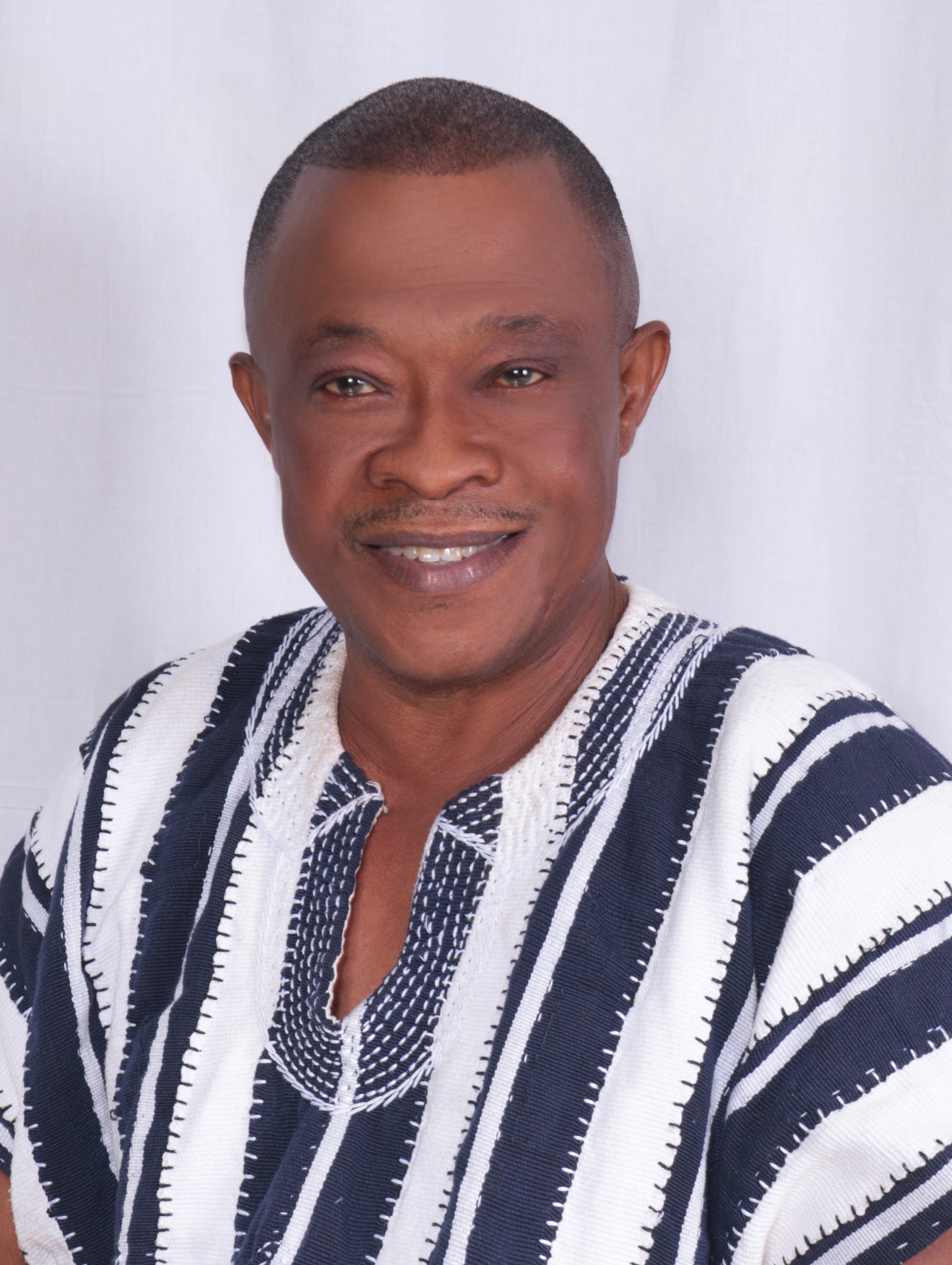

Member of the Ghana Parliament for Krachi East
- In office 7 January 2005 – 6 January 2017

Personal details
- Party: National Democratic Congress
- Education: Harvard University

Wisdom Gidisu (born 5 May 1967) is a Ghanaian politician who is the member of parliament for Krachi East Constituency in the Oti Region of Ghana.

== Early life and education ==
Gidisu was born on 5 May 1967 in a town known as Bakpa-Adidome in Volta Region of Ghana. Gidisu graduated from Harvard University's John F. Kennedy School of Government with a BSc in Public Administration. He then returned to the same institution to earn his master's degree in Governance and Leadership. He also had his Executive MBA from GIMPA in 2012. He had his certificate in Executive Education, Managing Change in Dynamic World from Harvard Kennedy in the USA. He also had a certificate in Advance Health System Management in Israel.

== Career ==
He is a managing director of Top-in-Town enterprise in Dambai.

== Political career ==
Gidisu began his political career as a member of the parliament in January 2005 after winning the 2004 general elections with National Democratic Congress (NDC) ticket.

He had a run of 3 terms in the office. He lost his seat to Micheal Gyato of the New Patriotic Party in the 2016 Ghanaian General Elections and he was aspiring for a comeback in 2020. He was a member and also the Vice Chairman of the Committee of Privileges, Health, House. Wisdom Gidisu makes a comeback after losing in 2016 to win the Krachi East seat in the 2020 General Election..[15]

== Personal life ==
He is married with eight children. He is a Christian (Evangelical Presbyterian).

== Philanthropy ==
He constructed classroom blocks and provided water facilities as well as markets for communities in his constituency. He also facilitated rural electrification for some villages. He also distributed corn mils to serve 80 communities whiles a legislator in his community.
