= Kingsley Aboagye Gyedu =

Ghanaian politician

Kingsley Aboagye Gyedu MP

Regional Minister of Western North
- In office March 2017 – March 2021
- President: Nana Akuffo-Addo
- Succeeded by: Joojo Rocky (Richard) Obeng

Personal details
- Born: Ghana
- Party: New Patriotic Party

Kingsley Aboagye Gyedu (born November 29, 1969) is a Ghanaian politician and a former Member of Parliament of Ghana. He is a member of the New Patriotic Party, a former deputy minister for health and former regional minister for the Western North Region of Ghana.

== Early life and education ==
Gyedu was born on November 29, 1969. He hails from the town of Sefwi Anhiawuso in the western region of Ghana. He holds an MBA in finance from the University of Leister in the UK, and earned his CA in Ghana and his BA in economics at University of Ghana, Legon.

== Career ==
Gyedu was a financial analyst at USAID in 2005, the Finance Manager at Bat West Africa Area from 2005 to 2007 and the executive director at Kingsag Associates Limited from 2007 to 2012.

== Personal life ==
Gyedu identifies as a Christian and a Methodist. He is married with five children.

== Politics ==
Gyedu obtained 33,145 votes which represents 51.80% of the total valid votes cast, and thus won the seat of Bibiani-Anwiaso-Bekwai constituency of the Western Region of Ghana. He was appointed to join the land and forestry committee and public accounts committee.
