= Kwadwo Kyei Frimpong =

Ghanaian politician

Kwadwo Kyei Frimpong is a Ghanaian politician and member of the 6th Parliament of the 4th Republic of Ghana representing the people of Bosome Freho in the Ashanti Region of Ghana.

== Early years and education ==
Frimpong was born on August 26, 1946, in a town called Amansie Nsuaem in the Ashanti region. He had his Bachelor of Science degree in Land Economy from Kwame Nkrumah University of Science and Technology, Kumasi in 1974.

== Career ==
He is a chattered surveyor and worked at Land Commission, Accra as Senior Lands Officer.

== Personal life ==
He is a Christian and married with five children.

== Political career ==
Frimpong began his political career in 2012 after defeating his opposition with 57.82%.
