= Fanteakwa South (Ghana parliament constituency) =

Constituency for the Parliament of Ghana

- constituency for the Parliament of Ghana
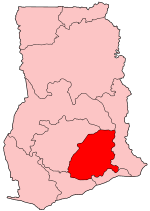
- District: Fanteakwa District
- Region: Eastern Region of Ghana

Current constituency
- Party: New Patriotic Party
- MP: Duke Ofori-Atta

Fanteakwa South is one of the constituencies represented in the Parliament of Ghana. It elects one Member of Parliament (MP) by the first past the post system of election. Duke Ofori-Atta is the member of parliament for the constituency. Fanteakwa South is located in the Fanteakwa District of the Eastern Region of Ghana.

== Boundaries ==
The constituency is located within the Fanteakwa District of the Eastern Region of Ghana. And compromise of towns like Nsutam, Nsuapemso, Saamang, Osino, Hemang, Dwenase, Abompe

== Members of Parliament ==
| Election | Member | Party |
|---|---|---|
| 2016 | Kofi Okyere-Agyekum | NPP |

2016 Ghanaian general election: Fanteakwa North Source: Peacefmonline
| Party | Candidates | Votes | % |
|---|---|---|---|
| NPP | Kofi Okyere-Agyekum | 11,274 | 60.79 |
| NDC | Abigail Elorm Akawambea Mensah | 5,726 | 30.88 |
| PPP | Godfried Mark Dankwah Nyarko | 483 | 6.77 |
| IND | Danso Okra Daniel | 223 | 1.20 |
| CPP | Kwablah Isaac Tettey | 66 | 0.36 |

== See also ==
- List of Ghana Parliament constituencies
- List of political parties in Ghana
