= Wa East (Ghana parliament constituency) =

Constituency in Ghana

- constituency for the Parliament of Ghana
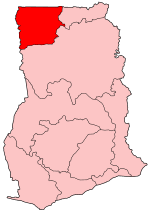
- District: Wa East District
- Region: Upper West Region of Ghana

Current constituency
- Party: National Democratic Congress
- MP: Godfred Seidu Jasaw

Wa East is one of the constituencies represented in the Parliament of Ghana. It elects one Member of Parliament (MP) by the first past the post system of election. Wa East is located in the Wa East District of the Upper West Region of Ghana.

== Boundaries ==
The seat is located within the Wa East District of the Upper West Region of Ghana.

== Members of Parliament ==
Election	Member	Party
1992	Alhaji Issahaku Saliah	National Democratic Congress
2004	Bayon Godfrey Tangu	New Patriotic Party
2020	Godfred Seidu Jasaw	

== Elections ==
2008 Ghanaian parliamentary election: Wa East Source:Ghana Home Page
Party	Candidate	Votes	%	±%
New Patriotic Party	Bayon Godfrey Tangu	10,047	48.0	—
National Democratic Congress	Ameen Salifu	9,037	43.2	—
Independent	Adam Basuglo Surajdeen	1,319	6.3	—
People's National Convention	Ibrahim Hidaya Sungjun	371	1.8	—
Convention People's Party	Yakubu Sangu	140	0.7	—
Majority		1,010	4.8	—
Turnout		—	—	—

== See also ==
- List of Ghana Parliament constituencies
