= Damango (Ghana parliament constituency) =

Parliamentary constituency in Ghana

- constituency for the Parliament of Ghana
- District: West Gonja District
- Region: Savannah Region of Ghana

Current constituency
- Party: New Patriotic Party
- MP: Samuel Abu Jinapor

Damango is one of the constituencies represented in the Parliament of Ghana. It elects one Member of Parliament (MP) by the first past the post system of election. Samuel Abu Jinapor is the member of parliament for the constituency. The Damango constituency is located in the West Gonja District of the Savannah Region of Ghana.

== Boundaries ==
The seat is located entirely within the West Gonja District of the Savannah Region of Ghana.

== Members of Parliament ==
| Election | Member | Party |
|---|---|---|
| 2016 | Adam Mutawakilu | NDC |

Ghanaian parliamentary election, 2016 : Damango Source:Peacefmonline
| Party | Candidates | Votes | % |
|---|---|---|---|
| NDC | Adam Mutawakilu | 10,263 | 55.22 |
| NPP | Albert Kassim Diwura | 8,19 | 43.79 |
| PPP | Abdul-Rashid Lawal | 112 | 0.60 |
| CPP | Sulemana Hamdal | 72 | 0.39 |

== See also ==
- List of Ghana Parliament constituencies
- List of political parties in Ghana
