= Talensi (Ghana parliament constituency) =

Constituency in Ghana

- constituency for the Parliament of Ghana
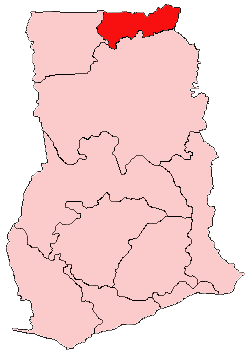
- District: Talensi-Nabdam District
- Region: Upper East Region of Ghana

Current constituency
- Created: 2004
- Party: National Democratic Congress
- MP: Daniel Dung Mahama

Talensi is one of the constituencies represented in the Parliament of Ghana. It elects one Member of Parliament (MP) by the first past the post system of election. Daniel Dung Mahama is the member of parliament for the constituency. Talensi is located in the Talensi-Nabdam district of the Upper East Region of Ghana.

== Boundaries ==
The seat is located within the Talensi-Nabdam District in the Upper East Region of Ghana.

== Members of Parliament ==
| Election | Member | Party |
|---|---|---|
| 1992 | John Akologu Tia | National Democratic Congress |
| 2012 | Robert Nachinab Doameng | National Patriotic Party |
| 2015 | Benson Tongo Baba | National Democratic Congress |

== Elections ==
Following Robert Nachinab Doameng (NPP) becoming the Paramount Chief of Tongo, a by-election was held resulting in Benson Tongo Baba of the NDC being elected MP for Talensi with a margin of 3521.

Talensi by-election, 2015 Source: Ghana Home Page
| Party | Candidate | Votes | % | ±% |
|---|---|---|---|---|
| National Democratic Congress | Benson Tongo Baba | 10,366 | 42.31 | +9.09 |
| New Patriotic Party | Thomas Pearson Duanab Wuni | 6,845 | 27.94 | −13.52 |
| People's National Convention | Michael Namalteng Wombeogo | 6,836 | 27.9 | +4.51 |
| Progressive People's Party | Joseph Toatoba | 214 | 0.87 | −0.05 |
| New Vision Party | James Mambora Doubil | 93 | | |
| Ghana Freedom Party | Philip Bameezina Yaro | 58 | | |
| United Progressive Party | Isaac Kungasore | 49 | | |
| Independent People's Party | Dennis Atiah Tambil | 38 | | |
| Majority | | 3,521 | 14.37 | |
| Turnout | | 24,499 | | |

2012 Ghanaian general election Source: Ghana Home Page
| Party | Candidate | Votes | % | ±% |
|---|---|---|---|---|
| New Patriotic Party | Robert Nachinab Doameng | 11,380 | 41.46 | |
| National Democratic Congress | John Akologu Tia | 9,119 | 33.22 | |
| People's National Convention | Michael Wombeogo | 6,420 | 23.39 | |
| Convention People's Party | Ramson Yinbil Dabitzaaya | 278 | 1.01 | |
| Progressive People's Party | Mogre Dominic | 253 | 0.92 | |
| Majority | | 2,261 | 8.24 | |
| Turnout | | 27,450 | | |

2008 Ghanaian parliamentary election: Talensi Source:Ghana Home Page
| Party | Candidate | Votes | % | ±% |
|---|---|---|---|---|
| National Democratic Congress | John Akologu Tia | 9,548 | 44.2 | |
| New Patriotic Party | Bisnab Sebastian Tibil | 7,496 | 34.7 | |
| People's National Convention | Michael Wombeogo | 4,394 | 20.4 | |
| Democratic Freedom Party | Grace Akua Yinmadug | 148 | 0.7 | |
| Majority | | 1,052 | 9.5 | |
| Turnout | | | | — |

== See also ==
- List of Ghana Parliament constituencies
