= List of MPs elected in the 2012 Ghanaian parliamentary election =

Colonial Era
1951 Assembly	(election)
1954 Assembly	(election)
1956 Assembly	(election)
First Republic
1957 Parliament	(election)
1965 Parliament	(election)
Second Republic
1969 Parliament	(election)
Third Republic
1979 Parliament	(election)
Fourth Republic
1st Parliament	(1992)
2nd Parliament	(1996)
3rd Parliament	(2000)
4th Parliament	(2004)
5th Parliament	(2008)
6th Parliament	(2012)
7th Parliament	(2016)
8th Parliament	(2020)
9th Parliament	(2024)

The election of Members of Parliament (MPs) to the 6th Parliament of the Fourth Republic was held on 7 and 8 December 2012. The Speaker is not an elected member of parliament though he/she is qualified to stand for election as such. There are a total of 275 constituencies in Ghana. 45 new constituencies were created prior to the 2012 election. The 6th Parliament shall have its first sitting on Monday 7 January 2013 at "five minutes past twelve midnight" (12:05 GMT) to elect a Speaker and Deputy Speakers as well as for the administration of Oaths to the Speaker and Members of Parliament.

== Current composition ==
Results from 275 constituencies are shown in the table below.

Affiliation	Members
National Democratic Congress (NDC)	148
New Patriotic Party (NPP)	122
Independent	4
People's National Convention (PNC)	1
Total	275
Government Majority	21

Current composition due to by-elections. The last by-election was the Talensi by-election which was conducted on 7 July 2015.

Affiliation	Members
National Democratic Congress (NDC)	148
New Patriotic Party (NPP)	121
Independent	4
Convention People's Party (CPP)	1
People's National Convention (PNC)	1
Total	275
Government Majority	21

== List of MPs elected in the general election ==
The following table is a list of MPs elected on 7 and 8 December 2012, ordered by region and constituency. The previous MP and previous party column shows the MP and party holding the seat prior to the election.

Table of contents:

Ashanti Region • Brong Ahafo Region • Central Region • Eastern Region • Greater Accra Region
Northern Region • Upper East Region • Upper West Region • Volta Region • Western Region
Changes • By-elections • Notes and References • See also • External links and sources

=== Ashanti Region - 47 seats ===
Constituency	Elected MP	Elected Party	Majority	Previous MP	Previous Party
Adansi-Akrofuom (formerly Akrofuom)	Kwabena Appiah-Pinkrah	NPP	1,387	Kwabena Appiah-Pinkrah (MP for Akrofuom)	NPP
Adansi-Asokwa	Kobina Tahir Hammond	NPP	1,639	Kobina Tahir Hammond	NPP
Afigya Kwabre North	Nana Marfo Amaniampong	NPP	11,390	New constituency	
Afigya Kwabre South	William Owuraku Aidoo	NPP	35,930	New constituency	
Afigya Sekyere East	David Hennric Yeboah	NPP	23,541	Hennric David Yeboah	NPP
Ahafo Ano North	Adusei Kwasi	NDC	423	Richard Akuoko Adiyiah	NPP
Ahafo Ano South East (New constituency)	Francis Manu-Adabor	NPP	2,285	New constituency	
Ahafo Ano South West	Johnson Kwaku Adu	NPP	4,845	formerly Ahafo Ano South	
Asante-Akim Central	Kwame Anyimadu-Antwi	NPP	15,559	New constituency	
Asante-Akim North	Kwadwo Baah Agyemang	NPP	5,207	Kwame Anyimadu Antwi	NPP
Asante-Akim South	Kwaku Asante-Boateng	NPP	11,961	Gifty Ohene Konadu	NPP
Asawase	Alhaji Muntaka Mohammed Mabarak	NDC	12,904	Alhaji Muntaka Mohammed Mabarak	NDC
Asokwa	Patricia Appiagyei	NPP	52,257	Maxwell Kofi Jumah	NPP
Atwima-Kwanwoma	Dr. Kojo Appiah-Kubi	NPP	38,888	Dr. Kojo Appiah-Kubi	NPP
Atwima-Mponua	Isaac Kwame Asiamah	NPP	9,504	Isaac Kwame Asiamah	NPP
Atwima-Nwabiagya North	Benito Owusu Bio	NPP	17,792	Benito Owusu Bio (MP for Atwima-Nwabiagya)	NPP
Atwima-Nwabiagya South	Anthony Osei Boakye	NPP	30,023	New constituency	
Bantama	Henry Kwabena Kokofu	NPP	40,387	Cecilia Abena Dapaah	NPP
Bekwai	Joseph Osei-Owusu	NPP	40,633	Joseph Osei-Owusu	Independent
Bosome-Freho	Kwadwo Kyei Frimpong	NPP	8,826	Nana Yaw Edward Ofori-Kuragu	Independent
Bosomtwe	Simon Osei Mensah	NPP	17,555	Simon Osei Mensah	NPP
Effiduase-Asokore	Frank Boakye Agyen	NPP	16,397	Frank Boakye Agyen	NPP
Ejisu	Kwabena Owusaduomi	NPP	40,188	(Ejisu-Juaben)	
Ejura-Sekyedumase	Mohammed Salisu Bamba	NPP	295	Alhaji Issifu Pangabu Mohammed	NDC
Fomena	Atta Boafo Daniel Kingsley	NPP	7,430	Nana Abu Bonsra	NPP
Juaben (New constituency)	Ama Pomaa Andoh	NPP	15,259	New constituency	
Kumawu	Philip Basoah	NPP	14,716	Yaw Baah	NPP
Kwabre East	Kofi Frimpong	NPP	44,527	Kofi Frimpong	NPP
Kwadaso	Owusu Afriyie Akoto	NPP	46,488	Owusu Afriyie Akoto	NPP
Mampong	Francis Addai-Nimoh	NPP	22,435	Francis Addai-Nimoh	NPP
Manhyia North (New constituency)	Collins Owusu Amankwah	NPP	23,336	New constituency	
Manhyia South	Matthew Opoku Prempeh	NPP	28,262	Matthew Opoku Prempeh (MP for Manhyia)	NPP
Manso Edubia (New constituency)	Yaw Frimpong Addo	NPP	18,042	New constituency	
Manso Nkwanta	Grace Addo (Former MP for Amansie West)	NPP	22,497	New constituency	
New Edubease	Ernest Kofi Yakah	NDC	3,699	Ernest Kofi Yakah	NDC
Nhyiaeso	Richard Winfred Anane	NPP	33,085	Richard Winfred Anane	NPP
Nsuta-Kwamang-Beposo	Kwame Asafu-Adjei	NPP	8,357	Kwame Osei Prempeh	NPP
Obuasi East (New constituency)	Edward Michael Ennin	NPP	8,831	Edward Michael Ennin (MP for Obuasi)	NPP
Obuasi West	Kwaku Agyeman Kwarteng	NPP	14,839	New constituency	
Odotobri	Emmanuel Akwasi Gyamfi	NPP	21,300	Emmanuel Akwasi Gyamfi	NPP
Offinso North	Augustine Collins Ntim	NPP	607	A. C. Ntim	NPP
Offinso South	Ben Abdallah Banda	NPP	17,133	Ben Abdallah Banda	NPP
Oforikrom	Elizabeth Agyemang	NPP	29,419	Elizabeth Agyemang	NPP
Old Tafo	Dr. Anthony Akoto Osei	NPP	44,257	Dr. Anthony Akoto Osei	NPP
Sekyere Afram Plains (New constituency)	Alex Adomako-Mensah	NDC	3,819	New constituency	
Suame	Osei Kyei Mensah Bonsu (Minority leader)	NPP	50,240	Osei Kyei Mensah Bonsu	NPP
Subin	Isaac Osei	NPP	31,721	Isaac Osei	NPP
=== Brong Ahafo Region - 29 seats ===
Constituency	Elected MP	Elected Party	Majority	Previous MP	Previous Party
Asunafo North	Robert Sarfo-Mensah	NPP	1,584	Robert Sarfo-Mensah	NPP
Asunafo South	Eric Opoku	NDC	2,775	George Boakye	NPP
Asutifi North	Benhazin Joseph Dahah	NPP	827	Paul Okoh	NPP
Asutifi South	Collins Dauda	NDC	3,257	Collins Dauda	NDC
Atebubu-Amantin	Sanja Nanja	NDC	5,551	Emmanuel Owusu Manu	NDC
Banda	Ahmed Ibrahim (Former MP for Tain)	NDC	695	New constituency	
Berekum East	Kwabena Twum-Nuamah	NPP	6,170	New constituency	
Berekum West	Kwaku Agyenim-Boateng	NPP	3,126	Kwaku Agyenim-Boateng (former MP for Berekum )	NPP
Dormaa Central	Kwaku Agyemang-Manu	NPP	2,944	New constituency	
Dormaa East	William Kwasi Sabi	NPP	3,805	Yaw Ntow Ababio	NPP
Dormaa West	Vincent Oppong Asamoah	NDC	1,893	Kwaku Agyemang Manu	NPP
Jaman North	Siaka Stevens	NPP	202	Alexander Asum-Ahensah	NDC
Jaman South	Yaw Afful	NPP	6,712	Afful Yaw Maama	NPP
Kintampo North	Stephen Kunsu	NDC	5,257	Stephen Kunsu	NDC
Kintampo South	Yaw Effah-Baafi	NDC	4,085	Yaw Effah-Baafi	NDC
Nkoranza North	Major Derrick Oduro	NPP	720	Major Derek Oduro	NPP
Nkoranza South	Emmanuel Kwadwo Agyekum	NDC	5,002	Kwame Ampofo Twumasi	NPP
Pru East	Kwabena Donkor	NDC	9,776	(Formerly Pru)	
Pru West	Masawud Mohammed	NDC	1,187	New constituency	
Sene East	Dominic Napare	NDC	5,406	New constituency	
Sene West	Kwame Twumasi Ampofo	NDC	5,790	(Formerly Sene)	
Sunyani East	Kwasi Ameyaw-Cheremeh	NPP	17,337	Kwasi Ameyaw Cheremeh	NPP
Sunyani West	Ignatius Baffour Awuah	NPP	457	Ignatius Baffour Awuah	NPP
Tain	Kwasi Agyemang Gyan-Tutu	NDC	4,368	Ahmed Ibrahim	NDC
Tano North	Freda Prempeh	NPP	3,742	Ernest Akobuor Debrah	NPP
Tano South	Hanna Louisa Bissiw	NDC	1,380	Andrews Adjei-Yeboah	NPP
Techiman North	Alex Kyeremeh	NDC	2,810	Christopher Ameyaw Akumfi	NPP
Techiman South	Adjei Mensah	NDC	7,772	Simons Addai	NDC
Wenchi	George Yaw Gyan-Baffour	NPP	2,218	George Yaw Gyan-Baffuor	NPP
=== Central Region - 23 seats ===
Constituency	Elected MP	Elected Party	Majority	Previous MP	Previous Party
Abura-Asebu-Kwamankese	Anthony Christian Dadzie	NDC	8,250	Anthony Christian Dadzie	NDC
Agona East	Queenstar Pokuah Sawyerr	NDC	17,652	John Agyabeng	NPP
Agona West	Charles Obeng-Inkoom	NDC	4,769	Samuel Kweku Obodai	NPP
Ajumako-Enyan-Essiam	Cassiel Ato Baah Forson	NDC	3,290	Cassiel Ato Baah Forson	NDC
Asikuma-Odoben-Brakwa	Georgina Nkrumah Aboah	NDC	2,700	Paul Collins Appiah-Ofori	NPP
Assin Central	Kennedy Agyapong (Former MP for Assin North)	NPP	3,145	New constituency	
Assin North	Ambre Samuel	NDC	2,057	Ken Ohene Agyapong	NPP
Assin South	Dominic Kwaku Fobih	NPP	1,931	Dominic Kwaku Fobih	NPP
Awutu-Senya East	Mavis Hawa Koomson	NPP	4,170	New constituency	
Awutu-Senya West	Hanna Serwaa Tetteh	NDC	4,545	Formerly Awutu-Senya	
Cape Coast North	Ebo Barton Oduro (former MP for Cape Coast); First Deputy Speaker	NDC	1,631	New constituency	
Cape Coast South	Kweku George Ricketts-Hagan	NDC	2,944	(formerly Cape Coast)	
Effutu	Alexander Afenyo-Markin	NPP	2,085	Mike Allen Hammah	NDC
Ekumfi	Abeiku Crentsil	NDC	7,220	New constituency	
Gomoa Central	Rachel Florence Appoh	NDC	4,334	New constituency	
Gomoa East	Ekow Panyin Okyere Eduamoah	NDC	3,089	Ekow Panyin Okyere Eduamoah	NDC
Gomoa West	Francis Kojo Arthur	NDC	7,954	Francis Kojo Arthur	NDC
Hemang Lower Denkyira	Foster Joseph Andoh	NDC	31	Rev. Benjamin Bimpong Donkor	NPP
Komenda-Edina-Eguafo-Abirem	Stephen Nana Ato Arthur	NPP	6,590	Joseph Samuel Annan	NDC
Mfantseman	Aquinas Tawiah Quansah	NDC	2,361	Aquinas Tawia Quansah (formerly MP for Mfantseman West))	NDC
Twifo-Atii Morkwaa	Samuel Ato Amoah	NDC	4,260	Elizabeth Amoah Tetteh	NDC
Upper Denkyira East	Nana Amoakoh	NPP	3,701	Nana Amoakoh	NPP
Upper Denkyira West	Benjamin Kofi Ayeh	NPP	3,919	Benjamin Kofi Ayeh	NPP
=== Eastern Region - 33 seats ===
Constituency	Elected MP	Elected Party	Majority	Previous MP	Previous Party
Abetifi	Peter Wiafe Pepera	NPP	9,002	Peter Wiafe Pepera	NPP
Abirem	Esther Obeng Dapaah	NPP	2,832	Esther Obeng Dapaah	NPP
Abuakwa North	Joseph Boakye Danquah Adu	NPP	6,503	Samuel Kwadwo Amoako (formerly Akim Abuakwa North)	NPP
Abuakwa South	Samuel Atta Akyea	NPP	22,421	Samuel Atta Akyea (formerly Akim Abuakwa South)	NPP
Achiase	Robert Kwasi Amoah	NPP	5,862	New constituency	
Afram Plains North	Emmanuel Aboagye Didieye	NDC	12,194	Emmanuel Aboakye Didieye	NDC
Afram Plains South	Joseph Appiah Boateng	NDC	7,598	Raphael Kofi Ahaligah	NDC
Akim Oda	William Agyapong Quaittoo	NPP	12,667	Yaw Owusu-Boateng	NPP
Akim Swedru	Kennedy Osei Nyarko	NPP	5,332	Joseph Ampomah Bosompem	NPP
Akropong	William Ofori Boafo	NPP	11,240	New constituency	
Akwapim South	Osei Bonsu Amoah	NPP	4,026	New constituency	
Akwatia	Baba Jamal Mohammed Ahmed	NDC	557	Kofi Asare	NPP
Asene-Akroso-Manso	Yaw Owusu-Boateng	NPP	6,116	New constituency	
Asuogyaman	Kofi Osei-Ameyaw	NPP	2,100	Joses Asare-Akoto	NDC
Atiwa East	Abena Osei Asare	NPP	9,929	New constituency	
Atiwa West	Kwesi Amoako Atta	NPP	11,192	Kwesi Amoako Atta (MP for Atiwa)	NPP
Ayensuano	Samuel Ayeh-Paye	NPP	5,014	Samuel Ayeh-Paye	NPP
Fanteakwa North	Kwabena Amankwa Asiamah	NPP	973	Kwabena Amankwa Asiamah (MP for Fanteakwa)	NPP
Fanteakwa South	Kofi Okyere-Agyekum	NPP	5,123	New constituency	
Kade	Ofosu Asamoah	NPP	10,338	Ofosu Asamoah	NPP
Lower Manya Krobo	Ebenezer Okletey Terlabi	NDC	8,186	Michael Teye Nyuanu	NDC
Lower West Akim	Gifty Klenam	NPP	8,438	Gifty Klenam	NPP
Mpraeso	Seth Kwame Acheampong	NPP	13,625	Seth Kwame Acheampong	NPP
New Juaben North	Kwasi Boateng Adjei	NPP	28,881	Hackman Owusu-Agyeman	NPP
New Juaben South	Mark Assibey-Yeboah	NPP	3,105	Beatrice Bernice Boateng	NPP
Nkawkaw	Eric Kwakye Darfour	NPP	20,256	Seth Adjei Baah	Independent
Nsawam Adoagyiri	Frank Annoh Dompreh	NPP	2,411	New constituency	
Ofoase-Ayirebi	David Oppong Kusi	NPP	5,366	David Oppong Kusi	NPP
Okere	Daniel Botwe	NPP	5,485	Daniel Botwe	NPP
Suhum	Frederick Opare-Ansah	NPP	388	Frederick Opare-Ansah	NPP
Upper Manya Krobo	Jeff Kavianu	NDC	7,020	Stephen Amoanor Kwao	NDC
Upper West Akim	Joseph Sam Amankwanor	NDC	3,763	Joseph Sam Amankwanor	NDC
Yilo Krobo	Magnus Kofi Amoatey	NDC	12,074	Raymond Tawiah	NDC
=== Greater Accra Region - 34 seats ===
Constituency	Elected MP	Elected Party	Majority	Previous MP	Previous Party
Ablekuma Central	Theophilus Tetteh Chaie	NDC	1,401	Chaie Tettey Theophilus	NDC
Ablekuma North	Justice Joe Appiah	NPP	18,581	Justice Joe Appiah	NPP
Ablekuma South	Frederic Fritz Baffour	NDC	10,034	Fritz Baffour	NDC
Ablekuma West	Ursula Owusu	NPP	10,822	New constituency	
Ada	Comfort Doyoe Cudjoe-Ghansah	NDC	14,451	Alex Narh Tettey-Enyo	NDC
Adenta	Emmanuel Nii Ashie Moore	NDC	4,613	Kojo Adu Asare	NDC
Amasaman	Emmanuel Nii Okai Laryea	NDC	7,963	(Formerly Trobu-Amasaman)	
Anyaa-Sowutuom	Shirley Ayorkor Botchway	NPP	21,660	New constituency	
Ashaiman	Alfred Kwame Agbesi	NDC	14,504	Alfred Kwame Agbesi	NDC
Ayawaso Central	Henry Quartey	NPP	635	Sheikh Ibrahim C. Quaye	NPP
Ayawaso East	Naser Toure Mahama	NDC	12,760	Mustapha Ahmed	NDC
Ayawaso North	Mustapha Ahmed (Formerly MP for Ayawaso East)	NDC	8,196	New constituency	
Ayawaso West Wuogon (New constituency)	Emmanuel Kyeremateng Agyarko	NPP	1,691	Akosua Frema Osei-Opare (Former MP for Ayawaso West)	NPP
Bortianor-Ngleshie-Amanfro	Bright Edward Kodzo Demordzi	NDC	188	New constituency	
Dade Kotopon	Nii Amasah Namoale	NDC	15,483	Nii Amasah Namoale	NDC
Dome Kwabenya	Sarah Adwoa Safo	NPP	28,007	Aaron Michael Oquaye (Second Deputy Speaker)	NPP
Domeabra-Obom	Daoud Anum Yemoh	NPP	4,529	Daoud Anum Yemoh	NPP
Korle Klottey	Nii Armah Ashitey	NDC	1,275	Nii Armah Ashitey	NDC
Kpone-Katamanso	Joseph Nii Laryea Afotey-Agbo	NDC	9,614	Josep Nii Laryea Afotey-Agbo	NDC
Krowor	Nii Oakley Quaye-Kumah	NDC	2,820	Nii Oakley Quaye-Kumah	NDC
Ledzokuku	Benita Sena Okity-Duah	NDC	10,516	Nii Nortey Duah	NDC
Madina	Amadu Bukari Sorogho (Formerly MP for Abokobi-Madina)	NDC	6,596	Amadu Bukari Sorogho	NDC
Ningo-Prampram	Enoch Teye Mensah	NDC	4,056	Enoch Teye Mensah	NDC
Odododiodio	Edwin Nii Lante Vanderpuye	NDC	19,698	Jonathan Nii Tackie Komey	NDC
Okaikwei Central	Patrick Yaw Boamah	NPP	7,264	New constituency	
Okaikwei North	Elizabeth Kwatsoe Tawiah Sackey	NPP	1,924	Elizabeth Kwatsoe Tawiah Sackey	NPP
Okaikwei South	Ahmed Arthur	NPP	9,831	Nana Akomea	NPP
Sege	Christian Corleytey Otuteye	NDC	3,119	Alfred Wallace Gbordzor Abayateye	NDC
Shai-Osudoku	David Tetteh Assumeng	NDC	11,098	David Tetteh Assumeng	NDC
Tema Central	Kofi Brako	NPP	12,588	New constituency	
Tema East	Daniel Titus-Glover	NPP	3	Samuel Evans Ashong Narh	NPP
Tema West	Irene Naa Torshie Addo	NPP	945	Irene Naa Torshie Addo	NPP
Trobu	Moses Anim	NPP	18,560	New Constituency	
Weija Gbawe	Rosemund Comfort Abrah	NPP	5,962	Shirley Ayorkor Botchway (MP for Weija)	NPP
=== Northern Region - 31 seats ===
Constituency	Elected MP	Elected Party	Majority	Previous MP	Previous Party
Bimbilla	Dominc Aduna Bingab Nitiwul (Deputy Minority leader)	NPP	13,487	Dominc Aduna Bingab Nitiwul	NPP
Bole Bamboi	Joseph Akati Saaka (Former MP for Bole)	NDC	6,350	Joseph Akati Saaka	NDC
Bunkpurugu	Solomon Namliit Boar	NPP	680	Duut Emmanuel Kwame (Formerly MP for Bunkpurugu-Yunyoo)	NDC
Chereponi	Azumah Namoro Sanda	NPP	1,115	Samuel Abdulai Jabanyite	NDC
Daboya-Mankarigu	Shaibu Mahama	NPP	1,603	New constituency	
Damango	Mutawakilu Adam	NDC	2,477	New constituency Formerly (Damango=Daboya)	
Gushiegu	Thomas Kwesi Nasah	NDC	337	Thomas Kwesi Nasah	NDC
Karaga	Alhassan Sualihu Dandaawa	NDC	2,541	Iddrisu Dawuda	NDC
Kpandai	Matthew Nyindam	NPP	2,427	Lipkalimor Kwajo Tawiah	NDC
Kumbungu	Muhammed Mumuni	NDC	9,762	Alhaji Yakubu K. Imoro	NDC
Mion	Ahmed Alhassan Yakubu	NDC	551	Ahmed Alhassan Yakubu	NDC
Nalerigu Gambaga	Tia Sugri Alfred (formerly MP for Nalerigu)	NDC	420	Tia Alfred Sugri	NDC
Nanton	Ibrahim Murtala Muhammed	NDC	1,702	Alhaji Abdul-Kareem	NPP
Saboba	Bukari Nikpe Joseph	NDC	676	Bukari Nikpe Joseph	NDC
Sagnarigu	Alhassan Bashir Fuseini	NDC	22,573	New constituency	
Salaga North	Alhassan Mumuni	NDC	3,310	New constituency	
Salaga South	Ibrahim Dey Abubakari (Formerly MP for Salaga)	NDC	2,255	Ibrahim Dey Abubakari	NDC
Savelugu	Mary Salifu Boforo	NDC	17,443	Mary Salifu Boforo	NDC
Sawla-Tuna-Kalba	Donald Dari Soditey	NDC	3,598	Donald Dari Soditey	NDC
Tamale Central	Inusah Fuseini	NDC	15,784	Alhassan Fuseini Inusah	NDC
Tamale North	Alhassan Dahamani	Independent	694	Alhaji Abubakari Sumani	NDC
Tamale South	Haruna Iddrisu	NDC	36,925	Haruna Iddrisu	NDC
Tatale-Sanguli	James C. Yanwube	NPP	36	New constituency	
Tolon	Wahab Suhiyini Wumbei	NPP	2,414	Umar Abdul-Razak	NDC
Walewale	Sagre Bambangi	NPP	4,136	Alidu Iddrisu Zakari	NDC
Wulensi	Laliri George Maban	NDC	1,027	Alhaji Saani Iddi	Independent
Yagaba-Kubori (Walewale West)	Ussif Mustapha	NPP	948	Abdul-Rauf Tanko Ibrahim	NDC
Yapei-Kusawgu	Amadu Seidu	NDC	667	Seidu Amadu	NDC
Yendi	Mohammed Habibu Tijani	NPP	8,733	Sulemana Ibn Iddrisu, Jnr	NDC
Yunyoo (New constituency)	Joseph Bipoba Naabu	NDC	5,273	Duut Emmanuel Kwame (Bunkpurugu-Yunyoo)	NDC
Zabzugu (Formerly Zabzugu-Tatale)	Jabaah John Bennam	NPP	1,087	Jabaah John Bennam	NPP
=== Upper East Region - 15 seats ===
Constituency	Elected MP	Elected Party	Majority	Previous MP	Previous Party
Bawku Central	Mahama Ayariga	NDC	4,989	Adamu Daramani	NPP
Binduri	Noah Ben Azure	NDC	8,545	Stephen Yakubu	NPP
Bolgatanga Central	Emmanuel Opam-Brown Akolbire	NDC	9,857	Akolbire Emmanuel Opam-Brown	NDC
Bolgatanga East	Dominic Ayine	NDC	5,318	New constituency	
Bongo	Albert Abongo	NDC	7,491	Albert Abongo	NDC
Builsa North	James Agalga	NDC	5,102	Timothy Awotiirim Ataboadey	NDC
Builsa South	Alhassan Azong	PNC	1,388	Alhassan Azong	PNC
Chiana-Paga	Abuga Pele	NDC	14,316	Allowe Leo Kabah	NPP
Garu	Dominic Azimbe Azumah	NDC	1,187	Dominic Azimbe Azumah	NDC
Nabdam	Boniface Gambila Adagbila	NPP	552	Moses Aduku Asaga	NDC
Navrongo Central	Mark Owen Woyongo	NDC	2,464	Joseph Kofi Adda	NPP
Pusiga	Laadi Ayii Ayamba	NDC	8,425	Simon Atingban Akunye	NDC
Talensi	Robert Nachinab Doameng	NPP	2,261	John Akologu Tia	NDC
Tempane	David Adakudugu	NDC	4,181	New constituency	
Zebilla	Cletus Apul Avoka	NDC	4,818	Cletus Apul Avoka (Majority Leader)	NDC
=== Upper West Region - 11 seats ===
Constituency	Elected MP	Elected Party	Majority	Previous MP	Previous Party
Daffiama-Bussie-Issa	Puozaa Mathias Asuma (Former MP Nadowli East)	NDC	2,362	New constituency	
Jirapa	Paul Derigubah	Independent	9,007	Francis Bawaana Dakurah	NDC
Lambussie	Edward K. Dery	NDC	5,875	John Duoghr Baloroo	NPP
Lawra	Samson Abu	NDC	6,147	Ambrose P. Dery	NPP
Nadowli Kaleo	Alban Sumana Kingsford Bagbin	NDC	3,990	Alban Sumana Kingsford Bagbin (Majority Leader)	NDC
Nandom	Benjamin Kunbuor (Majority leader)	NDC	5,839	New constituency	
Sissala East	Sulemana Alijata	NDC	2,384	Alhassan Dubie Halutie	NDC
Sissala West	Amin Amidu Sulemana	NDC	3,150	Haruna Bayirga	PNC
Wa Central	Abdul-Rashid Hassan Pelpuo	NDC	5,845	Abdul-Rashid Hassan Pelpuo	NDC
Wa East	Ameen Salifu	NDC	341	Bayon Godfrey Tangu	NPP
Wa West	Joseph Yieleh Chireh	NDC	6,450	Joseph Yieleh Chireh	NDC
=== Volta Region - 26 seats ===
Constituency	Elected MP	Elected Party	Majority	Previous MP	Previous Party
Adaklu	Kwame Governs Agbodza	NDC	10,927	New constituency	
Afadjato South	Joseph Zaphenat Amenowode (former MP for Hohoe South)	NDC	18,245	New constituency	
Agotime-Ziope	Juliana Azumah-Mensah (Ho East)	NDC	12,550	New constituency	
Akan	Joseph Kwadwo Ofori	Independent	803	Joseph Kwadwo Ofori	NDC
Akatsi North	Peter Nortsu-Kotoe	NDC	8,908	New constituency	
Akatsi South	Edward Korbly Doe Adjaho (Avenor-Ave)	NDC	11,643	Edward Korbly Doe Adjaho (First Deputy Speaker)	NDC
Anlo	Clement Kofi Humado	NDC	29,055	Clement Kofi Humado	NDC
Biakoye	Emmanuel Kwasi Bandua	NDC	10,622	Emmanuel Kwasi Bandua	NDC
Buem	Henry Ford Kofi Kamel	NDC	13,627	Henry Ford Kofi Kamel	NDC
Central Tongu	Joe Kwashie Gidisu	NDC	22,3589	Joe Kwashie Gidisu	NDC
Ho Central	Benjamin Komla Kpodo	NDC	53,371	George Kofi Nfodjoh	NDC
Ho West	Emmanuel Kwasi Bedzrah	NDC	29,609	Emmanuel Kwasi Bedzrah	NDC
Hohoe	Mrs. Bernice Adiku Heloo	NDC	34,128	New constituency	
Keta	Richard Quashigah	NDC	32,298	Richard Lassey Agbenyefia	NDC
Ketu North	James Klutse Avedzi	NDC	25,672	James Klutse Avedzi	NDC
Ketu South	Fifi Fiavi Franklin Kwetey	NDC	73,715	Albert Kwasi Zigah	NDC
Kpando	Della Sowah	NDC	16,769	New constituency	
Krachi East	Wisdom Gidisu	NDC	3,088	Wisdom Gidisu	NDC
Krachi Nchumuru	John Majisi	NDC	5,280	New constituency	
Krachi West	Helen Adjoa Ntoso	NDC	5,280	Francis Y. Osei Sarfo	NDC
Nkwanta North	John Oti Kwabena Bless	NDC	8,897	Joseph K. Nayan	NPP
Nkwanta South	Gershon Kofi Bediako Gbediame	NDC	5,405	Gershon Kofi Bediako Gbediame	NDC
North Dayi	George Loh	NDC	10,733	Akua Sena Dansua	NDC
North Tongu	Samuel Okudzeto Ablakwa	NDC	30,900	Charles Hodogbey	NDC
South Dayi	Simon Edem Asimah	NDC	9,186	Simon Edem Asimah	NDC
South Tongu	Kobena Mensah Woyome	NDC	28,368	Woyome Kobla Mensah	NDC
=== Western Region - 26 seats ===
Constituency	Elected MP	Elected Party	Majority	Previous MP	Previous Party
Ahanta West	George Kwame Aboagye	NDC	1,044	Samuel Johnfiah	NPP
Amenfi Central	George Kofi Arthur	NDC	4,258	George Kofi Arthur	NDC
Amenfi East	Akwasi Opong-Fosu	NDC	10,357	Joseph Baiden Aidoo	NPP
Amenfi West	Thomas Charlie Brown	NDC	9,606	John Gyetuah	NDC
Aowin	Mathias Kwame Ntow	NDC	9,005	Mathias Kwame Ntow	NDC
Bia East	Richard Acheampong	NDC	8,562	New constituency	
Bia West	Michael Coffie Boampong (Former MP for Bia)	NDC	16,375	New constituency (Formerly Bia but now Bia West and Bia East))	
Bibiani-Anhwiaso-Bekwai	Kingsley Aboagye-Gyedu	NPP	2,076	Christopher Addae	NPP
Bodi	Sampson Ahi	NDC	10,960	New constituency	
Effia	Joseph Cudjoe	NPP	10,960	New constituency (Formerly Effia-Kwesimintsim)	
Ellembelle	Emmanuel Armah-Kofi Buah	NDC	8,277	Emmanuel Armah-Kofi Buah	NDC
Essikado-Ketan	Joe Ghartey; Second Deputy Speaker	NPP	7,675	Joe Ghartey	NPP
Evalue-Ajomoro-Gwira	Kweku Tanikyi Kesse	NDC	2,212	New constituency (Formerly Evalue-Gwira)	
Jomoro	Francis Kabenlah Anaman	NDC	3,541	Samia Nkrumah	CPP
Juabeso	Kwabena Mintah Akandoh	NDC	8,649	Sampson Ahi	NDC
Kwesimintsim	Joe Baidoo-Ansah	NPP	6,278	Joe Baidoo-Ansah (Former MP for Effia-Kwesimintsim)	NPP
Mpohor	Alex Kofi Agyekum	NPP	781	New constituency	
Prestea-Huni Valley	Francis Adu-Blay Koffie	NDC	8,599	Francis Adu-Blay Koffie	NDC
Sefwi-Akontombra	Herod Cobbina	NDC	6,358	Herod Cobbina	NDC
Sefwi-Wiawso	Paul Evans Aidoo	NDC	10,067	Paul Evans Aidoo	NDC
Sekondi	Papa Owusu-Ankomah	NPP	1,094	Papa Owusu-Ankomah	NPP
Shama	Gabriel Kodwo Essilfie	NDC	1,252	Gabriel Kodwo Essilfie	NDC
Suaman	Stephen Michael Essuah Kofi Ackah	NDC	4,124	Stephen Michael Essuah Kofi Ackah	NDC
Takoradi	Kwabena Okyere Darko-Mensah	NPP	10,070	Kwabena Okyere Darko-Mensah	NPP
Tarkwa-Nsuaem	Gifty Eugenia Kusi	NPP	4,686	Gifty Eugenia Kusi	NPP
Wassa East	Isaac Adjei Mensah	NDC	5,246	New constituency (Formerly Mpohor-Wassa East)	

== Changes ==
- Henry Ford Kamel, MP for Buem and Minister for the Volta Region in the Mahama NDC government died suddenly on 25 December 2012 at Jasikan.
- Joseph Boakye Danquah Adu, the NPP MP for Abuakwa North constituency, was murdered at his home on 9 February 2016.

== By-elections ==
- Akatsi South constituency - 5 February 2013 - Edward Adjaho of the NDC became the Speaker of Parliament on 7 January 2013 triggering a by-election. Bernard Ahiafor of the NDC won by a majority of 3,767 votes (18.2%) to become the new MP.
- Buem - 26 February 2013 - Due to the death of Henry Ford Kamel of the NDC, a by-election was scheduled for late February 2013. This was won by Daniel Kosi Ashiaman of the NDC with a majority of 8,640 (78%) votes.
- Kumbungu - 30 April 2013 - Due to Alhaji Mohammed Mumuni vacating his seat to take up the position of Secretary-General of African, Caribbean and Pacific States, a by-election was held to elect his replacement. The seat was contested by the NDC, CPP and PPP. Amadu Moses Yahaya of the CPP, won with over 2,000 votes from his nearest competitor, Imoro Yakubu Kakpagu of the NDC. This becomes the first seat won by the CPP in the current parliament.
- Talensi - 7 July 2015 - Following Robert Nachinab Doameng (NPP) becoming the Paramount Chief of Tongo, a by-election was held resulting in Benson Tongo Baba of the NDC being elected MP for Talensi with a margin of 3521.
- Amenfi West - 15 December 2015 - A by-election was held to replace the late John Gyetuah of the NDC who died after a protracted illness. Eric Afful also of the NDC, won the seat with 52.64% of the vote. The closest in the election was Paul Dekyi of the NPP who had 43.54% of the total votes cast.
- Abuakwa North - 29 March 2016 - Following the death of J B Danquah Adu of the NPP, a by-election was conducted by the Electoral Commission of Ghana at the end of March 2016. The election on 29 March 2016 was worn by Gifty Twum Ampofo of the NPP, who won 89.6% of the total votes cast. The NDC did not take part in this election out of respect to J B Danquah Adu. Isaac Quartey of the United Front Party won 8.05% of the votes and Samuel Frimpong of the Ghana Freedom Party won 2.35% of the votes.

== See also ==
- 2012 Ghanaian parliamentary election
- Parliament of Ghana
- Edward Adjaho - Speaker of the 6th parliament of the 4th Republic.
