= Samuel Sallas Mensah =

Ghanaian politician

Hon. Sammuel Sallas Mensah

MP for Upper West Akim
- In office 7 January 1993 – 6 January 2005
- President: John Agyekum Kufour

Personal details
- Born: 7 July 1954 (age 72) Upper west Akim, Eastern Region Gold Coast (now Ghana)
- Party: National Democratic Congress
- Education: University of Pennsylvania,
- Occupation: Politician
- Profession: Chartered accountant

Samuel Sallas Mensah (born 7 July 1954) is a Ghanaian politician and a former member of parliament for the Upper West Akim constituency of the Eastern Region. He is also an accountant and a former chairman of the public accounts committee as well as a former chief executive officer of the public procurement authority. Mensah is currently the national treasurer of the National Democratic Congress, and was a parliamentary candidate for the upcoming 2020 Ghanaian general elections.

== Early life and education ==
Mensah was born on 7 July 1954 in Upper West Akim in the Eastern Region of Ghana. He attended the University of Pennsylvania and obtained his Bachelor of Arts after he studied Business administration. He was also a member of the American Institute of Certified Public Accountants and The Institute of Chartered Accountants, Ghana in 1199.He lso studied at The Ghana Institute of Taxationin 1986.

== Politics ==
Mensah was first elected to parliament on the ticket of the National Democratic Congress during the December 1992 Ghanaian General elections as a member of parliament representing the Upper West Akim Constituency in the Eastern Region of Ghana. In 1996, he obtained 16,684 votes out of the 28,395 valid votes cast representing 51.50% over Asamoah Evans Gilbertson who polled 10,634 votes, Joseph Cobbina Adika who polled 497 votes, Lawrence Boateng who polled 384 votes and Isaac Annoh who also polled 196 votes. In 2000, he won the seat with 12,150 votes out of the 22,503 valid votes cast representing 54.00% over his opponents Raymond Kwame Akuffour who polled 8,983 votes, Alex Addai-Mensah who polled 924 votes, Joseph Cobbina Adika who polled 309 votes and Ayisi Gyeke Opare who polled 137 votes. He again won the seat in 2004 with 14,064 votes out of the 28,947 valid votes cast representing 48.60% over Nana Yaw Asare Koranteng an NPP who polled 13,819 representing 47.70%, John Martey a CPP member who polled 765 votes representing 2.60%, Nana Asabir Nkum an EGLE member who polled 165 votes representing 0.60%, Agnes Akeley Adorshie a PNC member who polled 134 votes representing 0.50%, Salifu Alaru an IND member who polled 0 vote representing 0.00% and Raymond Kwame Akuffo an IND member who polled 0 vote representing 0.00%. He lost the seat in 2008 Ghanaian general election to Joseph Sam Amankwanor.

== Career ==
He is a chartered accountant by profession and a former member of Parliament for the Upper West Akim Constituency in the Eastern Region. He also worked as a tax expert.

== Personal life ==
Mensah is a Christian.
