= Yaw Owusu-Boateng =

Ghanaian politician

Yaw Owusu-Boateng (born July 25, 1955) is a Ghanaian educationist and politician. He was a member of the Sixth Parliament of the Fourth Republic of Ghana who represented the Asene/Akroso/Manso constituency in the Eastern Region on the ticket of the New Patriotic Party.

== Early life and education ==
Owusu-Boateng was born on July 25, 1955. He hails from Akyem Asene, a town in the Eastern Region of Ghana. He is a graduate of the University of Cape Coast where he obtained a Bachelor of Arts degree in Sociology and Geography in 1986. In 1999, he also earned his Postgraduate Certificate in Education in Comparative Education Research and project Management from University of Copenhagen in Denmark .

== Career ==
Prior to his appointment to parliament, he worked as program coordinator at American Field Service.

== Political career ==
Owusu-Boateng is a member of the New Patriotic Party. He was a member of the Fifth and Sixth Parliament of the Fourth Republic of Ghana. He was elected into the sixth parliament on 7 January 2013 after obtaining 57.57% of the valid votes cast in the 2012 Ghanaian general election. He was a member of committee on Housing and Special Budget.

== Personal life ==
He is a Christian, and is married with three children.
