= Alexander Gyan =

Ghanaian politician

Hon. Alexander Gyan
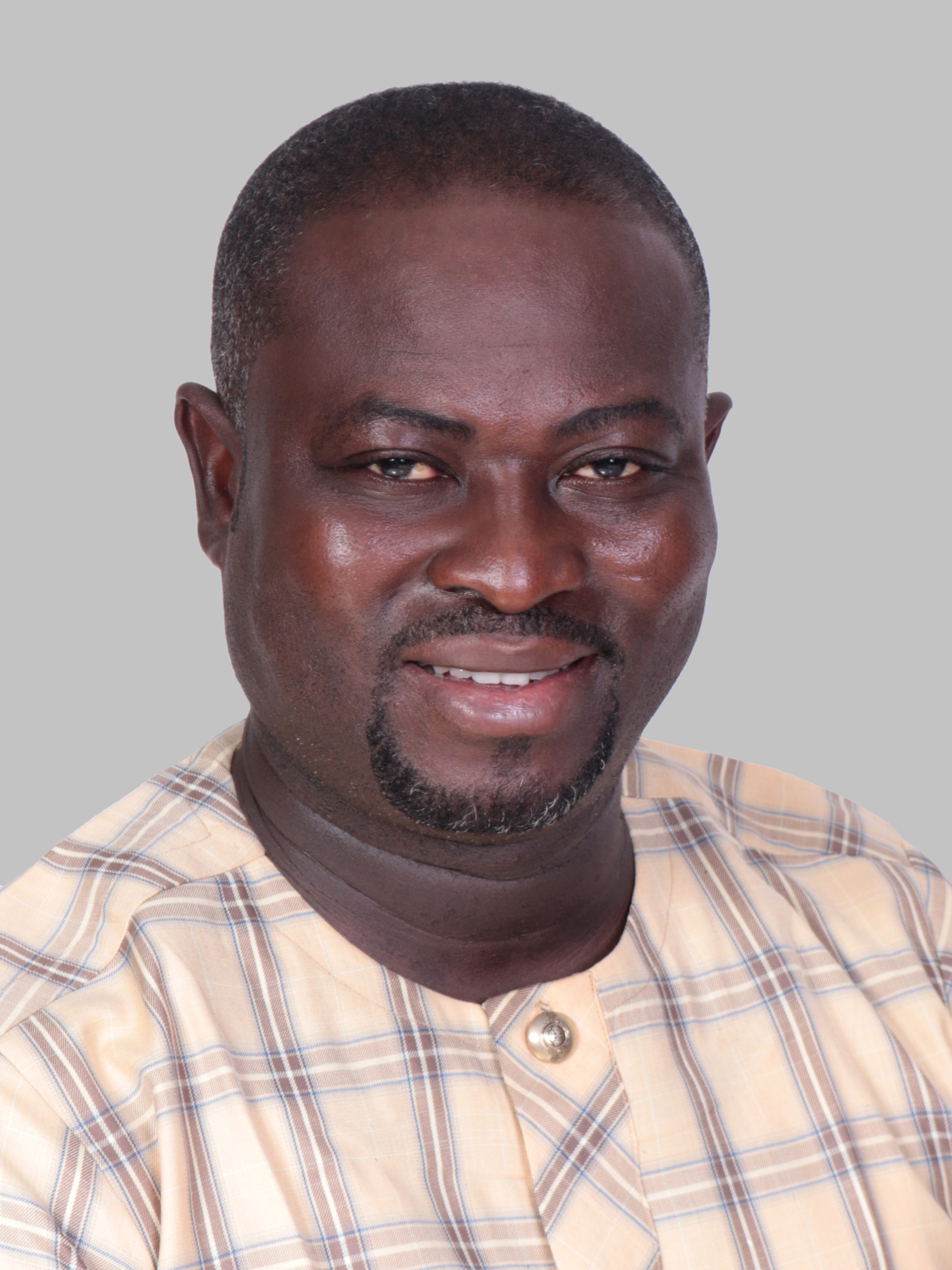

Member of Parliament for Kintampo South Constituency
- Incumbent
- Assumed office 7 January 2021
- Preceded by: Felicia Adjei

Personal details
- Born: Alexander Gyan; 26 March 1980 (age 46) Ampoma Kintampo, Ghana
- Party: New Patriotic Party
- Occupation: Politician
- Committees: Government Assurance Committee, Communications Committee

Alexander Gyan is a Ghanaian politician and member of parliament for the Kintampo South constituency in the Bono East region of Ghana.

== Early life and education ==
Alexander was born on 26 March 1980 and hails from Ampoma-Kintampo South in the Bono East region of Ghana. He had his SSSCE in 1999. He further had his BSc. in Agriculture Education in 2012.

== Career ==
Alexander was the District Chief Executive at the Ministry of Local Government and Rural Development for Kintampo South District.

=== Political career ===
Alexander is a member of NPP and currently the MP for Kintampo South Constituency.

=== Committees ===
Alexander is a member of the Government Assurance Committee and also a member of the Communications Committee.

== Philanthropy ==
In November 2021, Alexander provided free food and transportation to about 1357 students who were BECE candidates in the Kintampo South constituency.

== Controversy ==
In October 2020 when he was the then DCE of the Kintampo South District, he presented an award to his father as the 'best farmer' in the district. According to Mathew Atanga, a Communication's officer for NDC claimed other deserving farmers were robbed in a statement.
