= Zabzugu (Ghana parliament constituency) =

Ghana parliament constituency

- constituency for the Parliament of Ghana
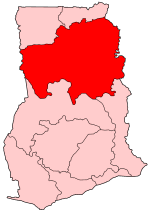
- District: Zabzugu/Tatale District
- Region: Northern Region of Ghana

Current constituency
- Party: NDC
- MP: Alhassan Umar

Zabzugu is one of the constituencies represented in the Parliament of Ghana. It elects one Member of Parliament (MP) by the first past the post system of election. The Zabzugu constituency is located in the Zabzugu/Tatale District of the Northern Region of Ghana.

== Boundaries ==
The seat is located entirely within the Zabzugu/Tatale District of the Northern Region of Ghana.

== Members of Parliament ==
Election	Member	Party
2016	Alhassan Umar	NDC

Ghanaian parliamentary election, 2016 : Zabzugu Source:Peacefmonline
Party	Candidates	Votes	%
NDC	Alhassan Umar	13,591	50.29
NPP	Jabaah John Bennam	13,434	49.71

== See also ==
- List of Ghana Parliament constituencies
- List of political parties in Ghana
