= Joseph Azumah =

Ghanaian politician

Hon. Joseph Azumah MP

Member of Parliament for Akrofuom Constituency
- Incumbent
- Assumed office 8 January 2024
- Incumbent
- Assumed office 7 January 2025
- President: John Mahama
- Vice President: Jane Naana Opoku-Agyemang
- Preceded by: Alex Blankson

Personal details
- Born: 15 April 1998; Zebila
- Party: National Democratic Congress
- Occupation: Politician

Joseph Azumah (born 15 April 1988) is a Ghanaian politician and a member of the National Democratic Congress. He represents Akrofuom constituency of the Ashanti region in the 9th Parliament of the 4th republic of Ghana.

== Early life and education ==
Azumah was born on 15 April 1988. He hails from Zebilla town in the Upper East Region of Ghana. He attended Mensonso D/A JHS and Primary to attain his Basic Education Certificate Examination(B.E.C.E) in 2005. He continued his education at Kumasi Secondary Technical School where he obtained his technical Certificate. He furthered his tertiary education at University of Cape Coast where he obtained his diploma and Degree in Management Studies in the year 2016 and 2018 respectively. He is currently pursuing his Bachelor of Law at Presbyterian University College.
