= Boamah =

Boamah is a surname of Akan origin meaning 'helper of nations'. Notable people with the surname include:

- Edward Omane Boamah (1974 – 2025), Ghanaian politician
- Michael Boamah (born 2003), Finnish footballer
- Patrick Yaw Boamah (born 1974), Ghanaian politician
