= Derek Darko Ohene Assifo Bekoe =

Ghanaian politician (born 1967)

Member of the Ghana Parliament for Upper West Akim Constituency

Personal details
- Born: 6 April 1967 (age 59)
- Party: National Democratic Congress

Derek Darko Ohene Assifo Bekoe (born 6 April 1967) is a Ghanaian politician and member of the Seventh Parliament of the Fourth Republic of Ghana representing the Upper West Akim Constituency in the Eastern Region on the ticket of the National Democratic Congress.

== Politics ==
Assifo Bekoe is a member of the National Democratic Congress (NDC) and was the member of parliament for the Upper West Akim constituency in the Eastern Region in the Seventh Parliament of the Fourth Republic of Ghana.

=== 2016 election ===
Assifo Bekoe contested the Upper West Akim constituency parliamentary seat on the ticket of the National Democratic Congress in the 2016 Ghanaian general election and won with 17,091 votes representing 50.26% of the total votes. He won the election over Eugene Sackey of the New Patriotic Party who polled 16,661 votes representing 49.00% and parliamentary candidate for the APC had 251 votes representing 0.71% of the total votes.

==== 2020 election ====
Assifo Bekoe again contested the Upper West Akim constituency parliamentary seat on the ticket of the National Democratic Congress during the 2020 Ghanaian general election but lost the election to Frederick Obeng Adom of the New Patriotic Party.
