= Kofi Frimpong =

Ghanaian politician

Hon. Kofi Frimpong

Member of the Ghana Parliament for Kwabre East Constituency
- In office 7 January 2013 – 6 January 2017
- President: John Mahama

Member of Parliament for Kwabre East Constituency
- In office 7 January 2009 – 6 January 2013
- President: John Atta Mills; John Mahama

Member of Parliament for Kwabre East Constituency
- In office 7 January 2005 – 6 January 2009
- President: John Kufuor

Personal details
- Born: 17 June 1951 (age 75)
- Party: New Patriotic Party
- Education: University of Ghana
- Profession: Businessman

Kofi Frimpong (born 17 June 1951) is a businessman and Ghanaian politician of the Republic of Ghana. He was the Member of Parliament representing Kwabre East constituency of the Ashanti Region of Ghana in the 4th,5th and 6th Parliament of the 4th Republic of Ghana. He is a member of the New Patriotic Party.

== Early life and education ==
Frimpong was born on 17 June 1951. He hails from Ntonso, a town in the Ashanti Region of Ghana. He is a product of the University of Ghana (UG). He holds a Bachelor of Arts degree in Sociology and Political Science from the university. He acquired the degree in 1978.

== Career ==
Frimpong is a businessman. He was the managing director of Bakota Medical Technology Limited in Kumasi. This was before he run for political office in 2004.

== Political career ==
Frimpong is a member of the New Patriotic Party. He became a member of parliament from January 2005 after emerging winner in the General Election in December 2004. He run for two more terms and won. He was the MP for Kwabre East constituency. He was elected as the member of parliament for this constituency in the fourth, fifth and sixth parliament of the fourth Republic of Ghana.

== Elections ==
Frimpong was elected as the member of parliament for the Kwabre East constituency of the Ashanti Region of Ghana for the first time in the 2004 Ghanaian general elections. He won on the ticket of the New Patriotic Party. His constituency was a part of the 36 parliamentary seats out of 39 seats won by the New Patriotic Party in that election for the Ashanti Region. The New Patriotic Party won a majority total of 128 parliamentary seats out of 230 seats. He was elected with 42,094 votes out of 51,871 total valid votes cast. This was equivalent to 81.2% of total valid votes cast. He was elected over Augustine Yeboah Domfeh of the National Democratic Congress and Agnes Donkor of the Convention People's Party. These obtained 8,906 and 871 votes respectively of the total valid votes cast. These were equivalent to 17.2% and 1.7% respectively of total valid votes cast.

In 2008, he won the general elections on the ticket of the New Patriotic Party for the same constituency. His constituency was part of the 34 parliamentary seats out of 39 seats won by the New Patriotic Party in that election for the Ashanti Region. The New Patriotic Party won a minority total of 109 parliamentary seats out of 230 seats. He was elected with 41,454 votes out of 54,517 total valid votes cast. This was equivalent to 76.04% of total valid votes cast. He was elected over Bismark Adu-Asere of the National Democratic Congress, Zacharia Awuah of Democratic Freedom Party and Alice Duah Boateng of the Convention People's Party. These obtained 10,824, 555 and 1,684 votes respectively of total valid votes cast. These were equivalent to 19.85%, 1.02% and 3.09% respectively of the total votes cast.

In 2012, he won the general elections once more on the ticket of the New Patriotic Party for the same constituency. He was elected with 62,048 votes out of 82,377 total valid votes cast. This was equivalent to 75.32% of total valid votes cast. He was elected over Fatao Iliyasu of the National Democratic Congress, Zacharia Awuah of the Progressive People's Party and Edward J.B Danquah an independent candidate. These obtained 17,521, 1,284 and 1,524 votes of the total valid votes cast. These were equivalent to 21.27%, 1.56% and 1.85% respectively of the total votes cast.

== Personal life ==
Frimpong is a Christian. He is a Seventh-day Adventist. He is married with ten children.

== See also ==
- List of MPs elected in the 2004 Ghanaian parliamentary election
- List of MPs elected in the 2008 Ghanaian parliamentary election
- List of MPs elected in the 2012 Ghanaian parliamentary election
