= Shaibu Mahama =

Ghanaian politician (born 1970)

Member of the Ghana Parliament for Daboya-Mankarigu Constituency

Personal details
- Born: 15 October 1970 (age 55) Ghana
- Party: National Democratic Congress
- Education: University of Cape Coast; Kwame Nkrumah University of Science and Technology; Ghana School of Law

Shaibu Mahama (born 15 October 1970) is a Ghanaian politician and member of the Seventh Parliament of the Fourth Republic of Ghana representing the Daboya-Mankarigu Constituency in Ghana's Northern Region on the ticket of the National Democratic Congress.

== Early life and education ==
Mahama was born on 15 October 1970. He hails from Daboya, a town in the Northern Region of Ghana. He went to Leicester Business School in the United Kingdom, where he obtained his Master of Business Administration degree in finance in 2001. He also studied at the University of Cape Coast, Ghana, and obtained a Bachelor of Commerce with Diploma in Education in 1997. He also attended Kwame Nkrumah University of Science and Technology, and Ghana School of Law, in 2008 and 2010 respectively.

== Politics ==
Mahama is a member of the National Democratic Congress (NDC). In 2016, he contested the Daboya-Mankarigu seat on the ticket of the NDC Seventh Parliament of the Fourth Republic of Ghana and won.

=== 2016 election ===
Mahama contested the Daboya-Mankarigu parliamentary seat on the ticket of National Democratic Congress during the 2016 Ghanaian general election and won with 9,208 votes representing 51.46% over Tika Samuel Yeyu of the New Patriotic Party who pulled 8,589 votes, which is equivalent to 48.00% and the parliamentary candidate for the Convention People's Party Alidu Mahama had 95 votes representing 0.53% of the total votes.

==== 2020 election ====
Mahama again contested the Daboya- Mankarigu (Ghana parliament constituency) on the ticket of National Democratic Congress during the 2020 Ghanaian general election but lost the election to Mahama Asei Seini of the New Patriotic Party.

== Employment ==
- Legal Office, Savanna Accelerated Development Authority (SADA), Accra Office Mahama worked at Ghana Breweries Limited from 1999 to 2000 as the Brewery Accountant, Purchase To Pay Manager at Guinness Ghana Breweries Limited from 2003 to 2007, an Associate at Just Kings & Associate from 2010 to 2012.

== Personal life ==
Mahama is Muslim, and is married with five children. He has five biological siblings and over 90 paternal siblings.
