= Frank Annoh Dompreh =

Ghanaian politician (b. 1977)

Hon. Frank Annoh-Dompreh MP
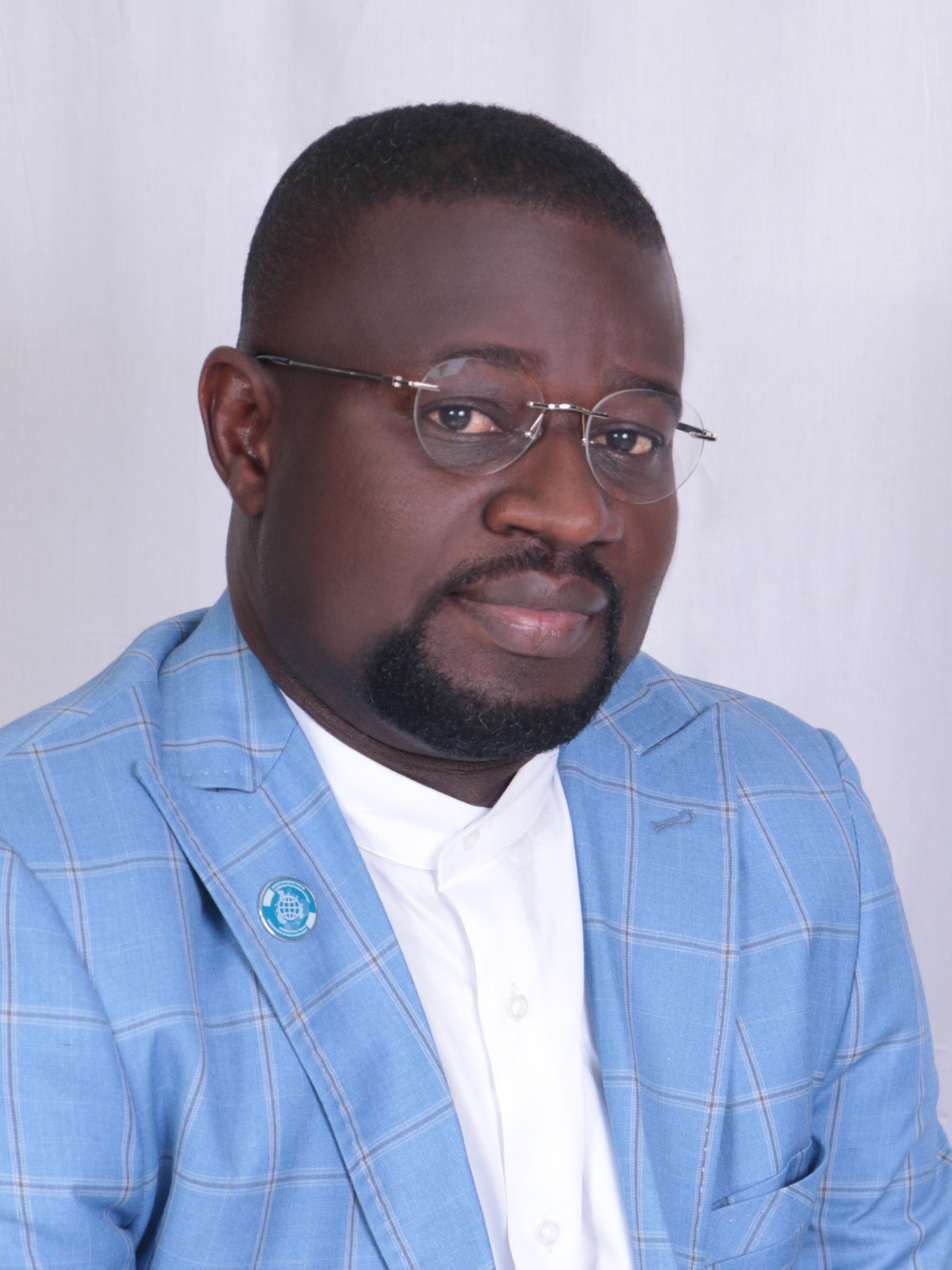

Member of the Ghana Parliament for Nsawam-Adoagyiri
- In office Jan 2013 – Jan 2025
- Preceded by: First

Personal details
- Born: 25 October 1977 (age 48) Nsawam-Adoagyiri, Eastern Region, Ghana
- Party: New Patriotic Party
- Education: University of Cape Coast
- Occupation: Politician
- Profession: Consultant
- Committees: Housing Committee (Vice-chairperson); Finance Committee; Education Committee; Foreign Affairs Committee, Appointments Committee, Business Committee; Committee of Selection Committee

Frank Annoh-Dompreh (born 25 October 1977) is a Ghanaian politician and consultant. He is a member of the New Patriotic Party and was the Member of Parliament for Nsawam-Adoagyiri between Jan 2013 and Jan 2025. He is the chairperson for the Parliamentary Select Committee on Foreign Affairs and a member of the Subsidiary Legislation and Roads and Transport Committee.

== Early life ==
Annoh-Dompreh was born in 1977 at Nsawam-Adoagyiri, Eastern Region, Ghana. He graduated from the University of Cape Coast with a Bachelor of Science in agriculture. He also studied at Mountcrest University where he obtained an LLB and LLM. He also obtained MSC. ENVIRONMENTAL SCIENCE from Institute of Local Government. He gained MSC. CLIMATE CHANGE at University of Ghana.

== Politics ==
Annoh-Dompreh started his engagement in politics as a student politician when he contested and was elected as president of the National Union of Ghana Students (NUGS) while a student of the university of Cape Coast in 2000. He was selected as the Eastern regional Youth Organizer for the New Patriotic Party. In 2012, He contested in the Nsawam/Adoagyiri NPP Parliamentary primaries against Seth Wiafe Danquah and was given the nod by delegates in the constituency, to represent them in the 2012 Ghanaian parliamentary election, by obtaining 366 out of the 482 votes cast. He proceed to win the seat against Ben Ohene-ayeh of the NDC. He retained his seat in the 2016 Ghanaian parliamentary election. He is also a member of the Parliamentary Select Committees on Subsidiary Legislation and Roads & Transport.

=== Committees ===
Annoh-Dompreh is the vice-chairperson of the Housing Committee. He is also a member of the Finance Committee; a member of the Education Committee; a member of the Foreign Affairs Committee, a member of the Appointments Committee, a member of the Business Committee and also a member of the Committee of Selection Committee.

== Personal life ==
Annoh-Dompreh is a Christian and attends the Church of Pentecost. He is married with three children.

== Controversies ==
In January 2025 during the vetting process, Annoh-Dompreh had an altercation with Emeafa Hardcastle who he accused of calling him "silly". It was alleged that Hardcastle confronted Annoh-Dompreh and said: "You are threatening me that you are taking me on because who are you? What do you mean by taking me on? You are a micro-minority. Doesn’t Afenyo-Markin himself use that phrase? I don’t have time for that. You think you can bully me here?" She later apologized to him.

In January 2025, he was suspended by Alban Bagbin for two weeks after he was involved in chaos during the sitting of the Appointments Committee.
