= Alhassan Umar =

Ghanaian politician

Member of the Ghana Parliament for Zabzugu Constituency

Personal details
- Party: National Democratic Congress

Alhassan Umar (born 29 June 1966) is a Ghanaian politician and member of the Seventh Parliament of the Fourth Republic of Ghana representing the Zabzugu Constituency in the Northern Region on the ticket of the National Democratic Congress.

== Early life ==
Alhassan was born on 29 June 1966 in Zabzugu on the Northern region of Ghana.

== Education ==
He holds a Master of Business Administration from the University of Phoenix, a BA Biological Science the State University of NJ, Rutgers University. He also holds a Diploma Teachers Certificate from Gambaga Training College.

== Personal life ==
he is a Muslim.
