= Emmanuel Kwasi Bandua =

Ghanaian lawyer and politician

MP for Biakoye
- Incumbent
- Assumed office 7 January 2012
- President: John Dramani Mahama

Personal details
- Born: 11 September 1949 (age 76) Bowiri-Anyinase, Volta Region Ghana)
- Party: National Democratic Congress
- Children: 3
- Education: University of Cape Coast, Ghana
- Occupation: Politician
- Profession: Lawyer

Emmanuel Kwasi Bandua (born 11 September 1949) is a Ghanaian lawyer and politician. He was the member of parliament that represented Biakoye constituency in the Volta region of Ghana in the Fourth and Fifth and Sixth parliament of the Fourth Republic of Ghana.

== Personal life ==
Bandua is married with three children. He is a Christian.

== Early life and education ==
Bandua was born on 11 September 1949. He hails from Bowiri-Anyinase in the Volta region of Ghana. He obtained his Bachelor of Arts degree in Economics and Sociology. He obtained a diploma in Education from the University of Cape Coast in 1980. He is also an alumnus of Ghana School of Law where he obtained his Bachelor of Law degree in 1990.

== Political career ==
Bandua is a member of the National Democratic Congress. He was first elected into office in the 2004 Ghanaian general election obtaining 16,083 votes out of 24,207 valid votes in his Constituency. He represented his constituency until 6 January 2017. He was a committee member of Business, Foreign Affairs, Lands and Forestry.

== Employment ==
Bandua is a lawyer. He was the Deputy Chief Manager of Bank of Ghana. He has been MP since January 2005.

== Committee ==
He was a member of committee for business, foreign affairs, Lands and forestry.
