= Frederick Obeng Adom =

Ghanaian politician

Hon Frederick Obeng Adom
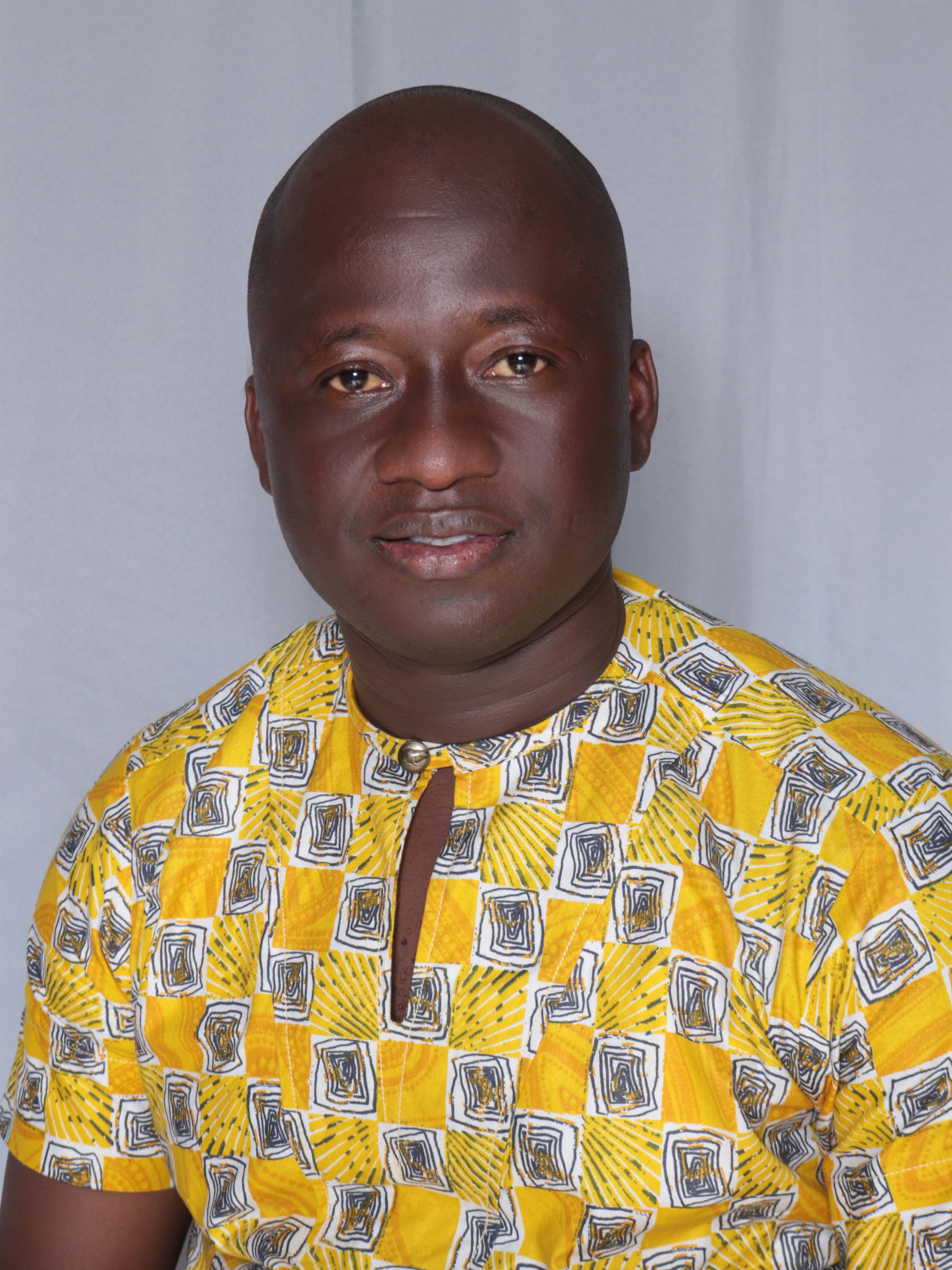

Member of the Ghana Parliament for Upper West Akim
- Incumbent
- Assumed office 7 January 2021

Personal details
- Born: Frederick Obeng Adom; 11 January 1984 (age 42) Aburi
- Party: New Patriotic Party
- Occupation: Politician
- Committees: Gender and Children Committee, Youth, Sports and Culture Committee

Frederick Obeng Adom (born 11 January 1984) is a Ghanaian Politician. He is a member of the Eighth Parliament of the Fourth Republic of Ghana representing the Upper West Akim Constituency in the Eastern Region on the ticket of the New Patriotic Party (NPP). He is the deputy minister of transportation.

== Early life and career ==
Adom was born on 11 January 1984. He hails from Aburi. He is a graduate of Ghana Institute of Management and Public Administration, where he was awarded a Bachelor of Science marketing in 2013. He was the business development officer of Fonak Technologies Ltd and Chief Executive Officer of Surveying Precision Market Ltd.

== Politics ==
Adom is a member of the New Patriotic Party (NPP). In June 2020 NPP parliamentary primaries, he contested and won to represent the NPP in the 2020 Ghanaian general election. He won the Upper West Akim Constituency seat in the general elections to unseat the incumbent member of parliament Ohene Assifo Derek Bekoe of the NDC, He polled 21,863 of the valid vote cast. He serves as member of House Committee and Mines and Energy Committee respectively in the Eighth Parliament of the Fourth Republic of Ghana.

He was nominated and appointed as the deputy minister of transportation by President Nana Akufo-Addo.
