= Kwabena Appiah-Pinkrah =

Ghanaian politician

Hon. Kwabena Appiah-Pinkrah

Member of Parliament for Akrofuom Constituency
- In office 7 January 2017 – 6 January 2021
- President: Nana Akufo-Addo

Member of the Ghana Parliament for Akrofuom Constituency
- In office 7 January 2013 – 6 January 2017
- President: John Mahama

Member of Parliament for Akrofuom Constituency
- In office 7 January 2009 – 6 January 2013
- President: John Atta Mills; John Mahama

Member of Parliament for Akrofuom Constituency
- In office 7 January 2005 – 6 January 2009
- President: John Kufuor

Personal details
- Born: 23 August 1947 (age 79)
- Party: New Patriotic Party
- Education: Fairleigh Dickson University, USA University of Bremen West, Germany
- Profession: Consultant
- Committees: Local Government and Rural Development Committee and Government Assurance Committee(7th Parliament of 4th Republic of Ghana)

Kwabena Appiah-Pinkrah (born August 23, 1947) is a consultant and Ghanaian politician of the Republic of Ghana. He is the Member of Parliament representing Akrofoum constituency of the Ashanti Region of Ghana in the 4th,5th,6th and 7th Parliament of the 4th Republic of Ghana. He is a member of the New Patriotic Party.

== Early life and education ==
Appiah-Pinkrah was born on August 23, 1947. He hails from Akrofoum, a town in the Ashanti Region of Ghana. He is a product of the Fairleigh Dickson University in the United States of America. He holds a Master of Arts in International Studies from the university. He acquired a diploma (higher level degree) from the University of Bremen West Germany.

== Career ==
Appiah-Pinkrah is a management and development consultant. He is the CEO of Global Linkages Company Limited in Accra.

== Political career ==
Appiah-Pinkrah is a member of the New Patriotic Party. He became a member of parliament from January 2005 after emerging winner in the General Election in December 2004. He has since then had a run of four consecutive terms in office. He is the MP for Akrofoum constituency. He has been elected as the member of parliament for this constituency in the fourth, fifth, sixth and seventh parliament of the fourth Republic of Ghana. He was a member of the Local Government and Rural Development Committee and Government Assurance Committee in the 7th Parliament of the 4th Republic of Ghana.

== Elections ==
Appiah-Pinkrah was elected as the member of parliament for the Akrofoum constituency of the Ashanti Region of Ghana for the first time in the 2004 Ghanaian general elections. He won on the ticket of the New Patriotic Party. His constituency was a part of the 36 parliamentary seats out of 39 seats won by the New Patriotic Party in that election for the Ashanti Region. The New Patriotic Party won a majority total of 128 parliamentary seats out of 230 seats. He was elected with 10,808 votes out of 15,645 total valid votes cast equivalent to 70.4% of total valid votes cast. He was elected over Joseph K. Abim of the National Democratic Congress. He obtained 29.6% of total valid votes cast.

In 2008, he won the general elections on the ticket of the New Patriotic Party for the same constituency. His constituency was part of the 34 parliamentary seats out of 39 seats won by the New Patriotic Party in that election for the Ashanti Region. The New Patriotic Party won a minority total of 109 parliamentary seats out of 230 seats. He was elected with 8,976 votes out of 14,606 total valid votes cast equivalent to 61.45% of total valid votes cast. He was elected over Opoku Ampofo Manu of the National Democratic Congress, Anthony Kwakye Ameyaw of the Convention People's Party and Boniface Nickson an independent candidate. These obtained 32.38%, 4.92% and 1.24% respectively of the total votes cast.

== Personal life ==
Appiah-Pinkrah is a Christian. He fellowships with the Methodist Church. He is married with four children.

== See also ==
- List of MPs elected in the 2004 Ghanaian parliamentary election
- List of MPs elected in the 2008 Ghanaian parliamentary election
- List of MPs elected in the 2012 Ghanaian parliamentary election
- List of MPs elected in the 2016 Ghanaian parliamentary election
