= Bia (Ghana parliament constituency) =

Ghana parliament constituency

- constituency for the Parliament of Ghana
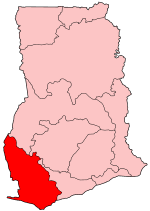
- District: Bia District
- Region: Western Region of Ghana

Current constituency
- Party: National Democratic Congress
- MP: Michael Coffie Boampong

Michael Coffie Boampong is the member of parliament for the constituency. He was elected on the ticket of the National Democratic Congress (NDC) won a majority of 14,605 votes to become the MP. He also was the incumbent MP before the 2008 elections.

== See also ==
- List of Ghana Parliament constituencies
