= Lower Manya (Ghana parliament constituency) =

Ghana parliament constituency

Lower Manya Krobo
- constituency for the Parliament of Ghana
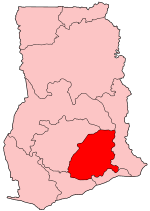
- District: Lower Manya Krobo District
- Region: Eastern Region of Ghana

Current constituency
- Party: National Democratic Congress
- MP: Ebenezer Okletey Terlabi

The Lower Manya Krobo constituency is in the Eastern region of Ghana. The current member of Parliament for the constituency is Ebenezer Okletey Terlabi. He was elected on the ticket of the National Democratic Congress.

== List of MPs ==
Year	Member of Parliament	Political Party	Votes	President
1996	Michael Teye Nyuanu	National Democratic Party (Ghana)	24,763	Jerry Rawlings
2000	Michael Teye Nyuanu	National Democratic Party (Ghana)	13,876	John Kufuor
2004	Michael Teye Nyuanu	National Democratic Party (Ghana)	18,571	John Kufuor
2008	Michael Teye Nyuanu	National Democratic Party (Ghana)	19,593	John Atta Mills
2012	Ebenezer Okletey Terlabi	National Democratic Party (Ghana)	24,367	John Mahama
2016	Ebenezer Okletey Terlabi	National Democratic Party (Ghana)	19,710	Nana Akufo-Addo
2020	Ebenezer Okletey Terlabi	National Democratic Party (Ghana)	26,991	Nana Akufo-Addo
2024	Ebenezer Okletey Terlabi	National Democratic Party (Ghana)	29,048	John Dramani Mahama

== See also ==
- List of Ghana Parliament constituencies
