= Yaw Effah-Baafi =

Ghanaian politician

Hon. Yaw Effah-Baafi

Member of the Ghana Parliament for Kintampo South
- In office 7 January 2013 – 6 January 2017
- President: John Mahama
- Succeeded by: Felicia Adjei

Member of Parliament for Kintampo South Constituency
- In office 7 January 2009 – 6 January 2013
- President: John Atta Mills; John Mahama

Member of Parliament for Kintampo South Constituency
- In office 7 January 2005 – 6 January 2009
- President: John Kufuor
- Preceded by: new constituency

Personal details
- Born: 21 September 1955 (age 71)
- Party: National Democratic Congress
- Children: 5
- Education: Kwame Nkrumah University of Science and Technology, Ghana Institute of Management and Public Administration
- Profession: Agriculturist

Yaw Effah-Baafi (born 21 September 1955) served as the Member of Parliament of Kintampo South in the Brong Ahafo region of Ghana.

== Early life and education ==
Effah-Baafi was born on 21 September 1955 in Tanfiano No. 2 in the Brong Ahafo region. He attended Kwame Nkrumah University of Science and Technology (KNUST) where he earned his BSc. in Agriculture in 1985. He also graduated from Ghana institute of Management and Public Administration(GIMPA) where he obtained a postgraduate certificate in Administration in 1997 and EMGL in 2008.

== Career ==
Effah-Baafi is an agriculturist. He was the Regional Coordinator for On-Farm trial in MOFA. He also served as the board chairman of Kintampo Rural Bank.

== Politics ==
Effah-Baafi is a member of National Democratic Congress. He was the Deputy Minister in the Ministry of Food and Agriculture. He was also Deputy Minister in the Ministry of Chieftaincy and Traditional Affairs Ghana. He was elected as Member of the Parliament in January 2001 and had a run of 4 terms in office. He was member of committees on Poverty Reduction Strategy, Roads and Transport, Standing Orders Committee, Subsidiary Legislation Committee.

== Elections ==
=== 2000 Elections ===
In the year 2000, Effah Baafi won the Ghanaian general elections as the member of parliament for the Kintampo constituency of the Brong Ahafo Region of Ghana. He won on the ticket of the National Democratic Congress. His constituency was a part of the 7 parliamentary seats out of 21 seats won by the National Democratic Congress in that election for the Brong Ahafo Region. The National Democratic Congress won a minority total of 92 parliamentary seats out of 200 seats in the 3rd parliament of the 4th republic of Ghana. He was elected with 14,134 votes out of 45,801 total valid votes cast. This was equivalent to 32.0% of the total valid votes cast. He was elected over Yaw Adjei-Duffour of the New Patriotic Party, Ishmale Bin Abdallah, Emmanuel Nsiah Dwomoh and Gladys Abena Nsowaa - independent candidates, Peter Ndela of the People's National Convention, Ahmed Mohammed Dapaah of the Convention People's Party, Sulemana Badivare Kukuje of the National Reform Party and Anarwat Joseph Yendu of the United Ghana Movement. These obtained 13,039, 4,760, 3,473, 1,737, 3,593, 1,626, 976 and 815 votes respectively out of the total valid votes cast. These were equivalent to 29.5%, 10.8%, 7.9%, 3.9%, 8.1%, 3.7%, 2.2% and 1.8% respectively of total valid votes cast.

=== 2004 Elections ===
Effah- Baafi was elected as the Member of Parliament for the Kintampo South constituency in the 2004 Ghanaian general elections. He thus represented the constituency in the 4th parliament of the 4th republic of Ghana. He was elected with 14,040votes out of 24,869 total valid votes cast. This was equivalent to 56.50% of total valid votes cast. He was elected over Kwasi Adu Gyan of the New Patriotic Party, Appiah Emmanuel Kwame of the Democratic People's Party and Duffour Stephen K of the Convention People's Party. These obtained 38.10%, 4.00% and 1.50% of respectively of total valid votes cast. Effah-Baafi was elected on the ticket of the National Democratic Congress. His constituency formed a part of 10 parliamentary seats won by the party out of a total 24 parliamentary seats for the Brong Ahafo region. In the 2004 Ghanaian general elections the National Democratic Congress won a minority total of 94 parliamentary representation out of a total of 230 parliamentary seats in the 4th parliament of the 4th republic of Ghana.

Effah-Baafi was re-elected as the Member of parliament for the Kintampo South constituency in the 2008 Ghanaian general elections. He represented the constituency again in the 5th parliament of the 4th republic of Ghana. He was elected with 13,009votes out of 23,921 total valid votes cast. This was equivalent to 54.38% of total valid votes cast. He was elected over Yaw Adjei-Duffour of the New Patriotic Party and Atomeh Koranteng Joseph of the People's National Convention. These obtained 44.52% and 1.16% respectively of all total valid votes cast. Effah-Baafi was elected again on the ticket of the National Democratic Congress. The National Democratic Congress won majority total of 114 parliamentary representation out of a total 230parliamentary seats in the 5th parliament of the 4th republic of Ghana.

== Personal life ==
He is married with five children. He is a Christian and attends the Church of Pentecost.
