= Mahama Asei Seini =

Ghanaian politician

Hon. Mohammed Asei Seini
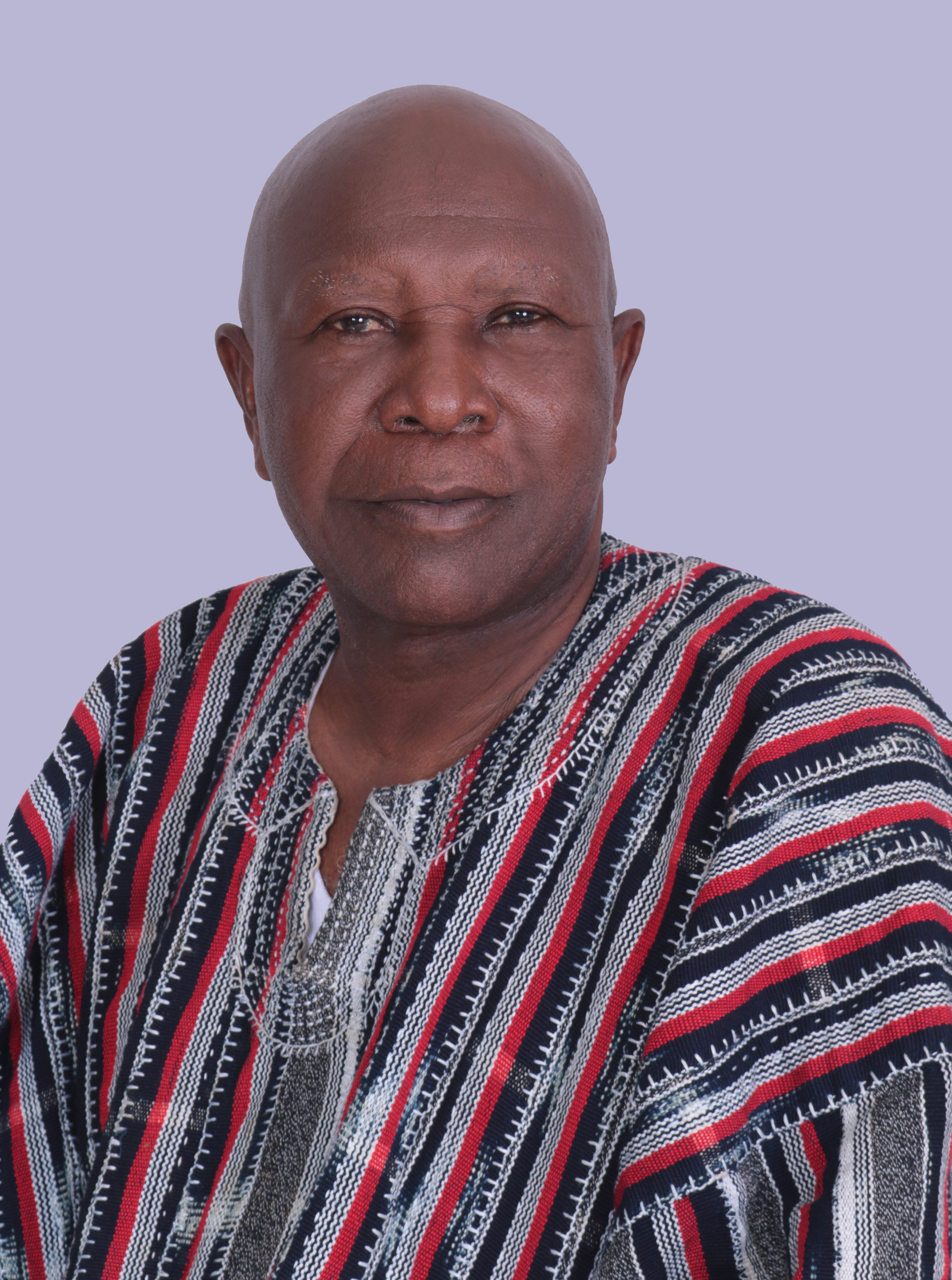

Member of Parliament for Daboya Mankarigu Constituency
- Incumbent
- Assumed office 7 January 2021
- Preceded by: Shaibu Mahama

Personal details
- Born: Mohammed Asei Seini; 15 November 1960 (age 65) Daboya, Savannah Region, Ghana
- Party: New Patriotic Party
- Occupation: Politician
- Committees: Gender and Children Committee; Food, Agriculture and Cocoa Affairs Committee

Mahama Asei Seini (born 15 November 1960) is a Ghanaian politician. He is a member of the Eighth Parliament of the Fourth Republic of Ghana representing the Daboya Mankarigu Constituency in the North Gonja District in the Savannah Region of Ghana. He is the deputy minister for Health

== Early life and career ==
Seini was born on 15 November 1960. He hails from Daboya. He holds a degree in B.A economic and law (1992). He was a Chief revenue officer of Ghana Revenue Authority.

== Politics ==
Seini is a member of the New Patriotic Party. He was the party's candidate for the December 2020 election. He won the parliamentary election with 14,391 votes representing 59.6% of the total votes cast, beating his main opponent and incumbent member of parliament Shaibu Mahama of the NDC who obtained 9,751 votes representing 40.4% of the total valid votes cast.

=== Committees ===
He serves as a member of the Gender and Children Committee and Food, Agriculture and Cocoa Affairs Committee respectively in the Eighth Parliament of the Fourth Republic of Ghana.

== Personal life ==
He is a Muslim.
