= Samson Abu =

Ghanaian politician (born 1969)

Hon. Samson Abu

Member of Ghana Parliament Lawra
- In office 7 January 2013 – 6 January 2017

Personal details
- Born: 18 December 1969 (age 56) Dikpe - Lawra, Ghana
- Party: National Democratic Congress
- Education: University of Ghana
- Profession: Teacher, Administrator

Samson Abu (born 18 December 1969) is a Ghanaian politician and member of the Sixth Parliament of the Fourth Republic of Ghana representing the Lawra Constituency in the Upper West Region of Ghana.

== Personal life ==
Abu is married with four children. He is a Christian (Catholic).

== Early life and education ==
Abu was born on 18 December 1969 and hails from Dikpe - Lawra in the Upper West Region. He attended the University of Ghana where he earned his bachelor's degree in Administration in 2004.

== Politics ==
Abu is a member of the National Democratic Congress and the Member of Parliament for the Lawra Constituency from 2013 to 2017.

He was a committee member for Education, Youth, Sports and Culture and Judiciary.

=== Independent candidacy ===
In 2016, Abu defected from the NDC and became an independent candidate after he was defeated by Bede Ziedeng in their primaries.

== Employment ==
Abu was a Ghana Health Service Administrator at the Lawra Hospital. He was at the Office of President as a DCE from April 2005 to January 2013. He was a teacher with Ghana Education Service from 1994 to 2000. He is a health worker.
