= Felicia Adjei =

Ghanaian politician

Hon. Felicia Adjei
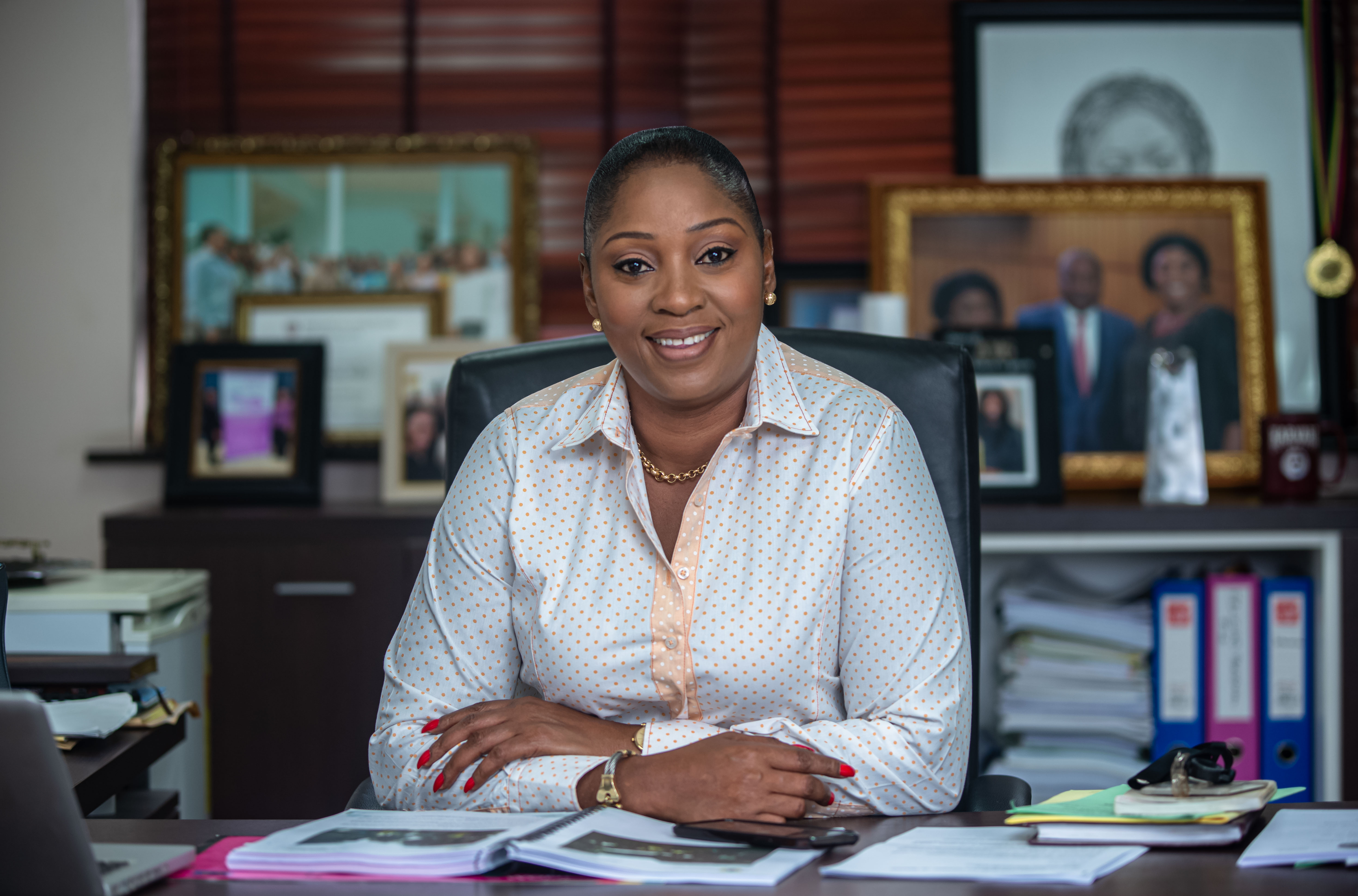

Member of the Ghana Parliament for Kintampo South
- Incumbent
- Assumed office 7 January 2017
- Preceded by: Yaw Effah-Baafi

Personal details
- Born: Felicia Adjei; 3 March 1974 (age 52) Anyima, Brong Ahafo Region
- Party: National Democratic Congress
- Children: 1
- Education: Adventist Vocational Institution
- Occupation: Politician
- Profession: Consultant
- Committees: Government Assurance Committee, Mines and Energy Committee

Felicia Adjei (born 3 March 1974) is a Ghanaian politician and was the Member of Parliament for Kintampo South Constituency in the Brong Ahafo Region of Ghana. She is a member of National Democratic Congress .

== Early life and education ==
Adjei was born in Anyima, Brong Ahafo Region. She had her early education at the Kintampo Methodist School. She holds an advanced diploma in Catering, Food and Nutrition from the Adventist Vocational Institution now Techiman Campus of the Valley View University. She also holds a Cookery for Catering Industry diploma from the Sunyani Polytechnic now Sunyani Technical University.

== Career ==
She moved to the United States of America for a while after working at the Catering Guest House in Sunyani. She returned to Ghana to work as the managing director of Addfal FA Limited. She also founded the Felicia Adjei foundation with the objective of to empower women through vocational training, youth development through education and sports, farming, supporting the physically challenged and the provision of healthcare and other of community development.

== Politics ==
She is a member of the National Democratic Congress. She won the 2016 parliamentary elections to become a member of parliament for Kintampo South Constituency in the 7th parliament of the 4th Republic of Ghana.

She won after garnering 15,266 votes representing 51.79% against her contender Gyan Alexander of the New Patriotic Party who had 14,210 representing 48.21%. In the 7th parliament she served on the Gender and Children committee and the communications committee.

== Personal life ==
She is single with one daughter. Felicia is a Christian.
