= Emeafa Hardcastle =

Ghanaian lawyer

Victoria Emeafa Hardcastle is a Ghanaian lawyer, energy expert and legal practitioner. In January 2025, John Mahama appointed her as acting chief executive officer of the Petroleum Commission.

== Education ==
Hardcastle had her BA in law and sociology from the University of Ghana, Legon. She further had her LLM in banking and finance from the London School of Economics and Political Science as a Chevening scholar. She also had her BL from the Ghana School of Law.

== Career ==
Hardcastle is a member of the Ghana Bar Association. She was admitted into the Ghana Bar in 1995. She is a senior partner at LithurBrew & Company. She worked with the Petroleum Commission of Ghana from 2011 to 2017. She also participated in the International Lawyers for Africa program at the UK-based law firm Hogan Lovells. She has also worked at the Swiss embassy as a deputy head, Economic Section, Economic Trade attaché.

== Awards ==
Hardcastle received the F.K.A. Apaloo Prize for Company Law.

== Controversy ==
In January 2025 during the vetting process, Hardcastle had an altercation with Frank Annoh-Dompreh, who accused her of calling him "silly". It was alleged she confronted Annoh-Dompreh and said: "You are threatening me that you are taking me on because who are you? What do you mean by taking me on? You are a micro-minority. Doesn’t Afenyo-Markin himself use that phrase? I don’t have time for that. You think you can bully me here?" She later apologized to him.

The Minority caucus in the Parliament of Ghana condemned her conduct and called for action against her.

Haruna Iddrisu also condemned the incident and apologised on her behalf.
