= Charles Obeng-Inkoom =

Ghanaian politician

Charles Obeng-Inkoom (born 30 April 1958) is the member of parliament for Agona West in the Central region of Ghana.

== Personal life ==
Charles is married with four children. He is a Christian (Church of Pentecost).

== Early life and education ==
He was born on 30 April 1958 in Agona-Abodom in Central region. He had his LLB at University of Ghana in 1985 and his BL at Ghana School of Law in 1988.

== Politics ==
He is a member of National Democratic Congress.

== Employment ==
He is a lawyer. He was the assistant general manager (legal) for The Ecobank Ghana Limited in Accra from 2012/05/01- 2012/10/01.

The Trust Bank assistant general manager from 1996/11/04- 2012/04/30. Assistant Manager for Meridian Biao Bank.
