= Ebenezer Okletey Terlabi =

Ghanaian politician (born 1963)

Hon. Ebenezer Okletey Terlabi MP
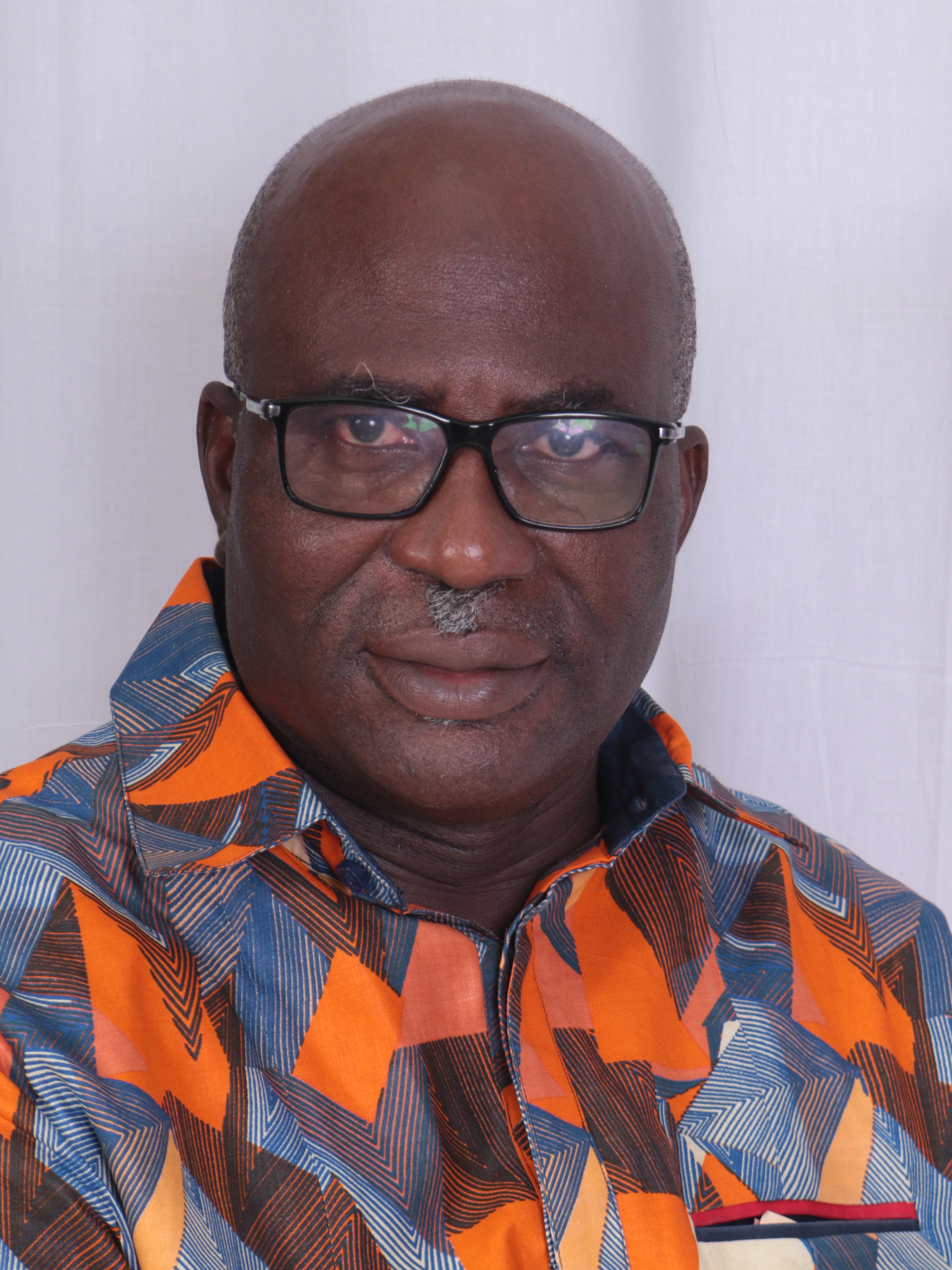
- In office 2009–2013
- Succeeded by: Mavis Ama Frimpong
- President: John Dramani Mahama

Personal details
- Born: 3 September 1963 (age 63) Ghana
- Party: NDC
- Education: Kwame Nkrumah University of Science and Technology
- Occupation: Lecturer
- Profession: Biochemist
- Cabinet: Deputy Minister for Defense

Ebenezer Okletey Terlabi (born 3 September 1963) is a Ghanaian politician and a former deputy Eastern Regional Minister of Ghana. He was appointed by President John Atta Mills and served till January 2013. He is currently the deputy Minister of Defence of Ghana.

== Personal ==
Terlabi is a Christian (Church of Pentecost). He is married with three children.

== Early life and education ==
Terlabi was born on 3 September 1963. He hails from Odumase-Krobo, a town in the Eastern Region of Ghana. He studied at Kwame Nkrumah University of Science and Technology, where he obtained his Master of Philosophy degree in biochemistry in 2000.

== Politics ==
Terlabi is a member of the National Democratic Congress (NDC). In 2012, he contested for the Lower Manya Krobo seat on the ticket of the NDC sixth parliament of the fourth republic and won. He won against the then incumbent Hon. Michael Teye Nyaunu.

=== 2016 election ===
Terlabi contested the Lower Manya Krobo constituency parliamentary seat on the ticket of the National Democratic Congress during the 2016 Ghanaian general election and won the election with 19,710 votes, representing 49.74% of the total votes. He won the election over Samuel Nuertey Ayertey of the New Patriotic Party had 19,383 which is equivalent to 48.91% and the parliamentary candidate for the Convention People's Party Foster Emmanuel Okley had 536 votes representing 1.35% of the total votes.

==== 2020 election ====
During the 2020 Ghanaian general election, Terlabi again contested the Lower Manya Krobo constituency parliamentary seat on the ticket of the National Democratic Congress and won the election with 26,991 votes representing 54.27% of the total votes. He won the election over Samuel Nuertey Ayertey of the New Patriotic Party who polled 22,029 votes which is equivalent to 44.29% and the parliamentary candidate for the GUM Daniel Ofoe Kudonu had 714 votes representing 1.44% of the total votes.

=== Committees ===
Terlabi is a member of Environment, Science and Technology committee, Gender and Children committee and selection committee.

== Employment ==
- Lecturer of Biochemistry
- Deputy Easter Regional Minister, 2011 – January 7, 2013
