= James Cecil Yanwube =

Ghanaian politician

James Cecil Yanwube (born December 25, 1962) was a Ghanaian politician and member of the Sixth Parliament of the Fourth Republic of Ghana representing the Tatale-Sanguli Constituency in the Northern Region on the ticket of the New Patriotic Party. He previously occupied the position of Tatale/Sanguli District chief executive in the northern region of Ghana.

== Personal life ==
Yanwube is a Christian (Baptist). He is married (with four children).

== Early life and education ==
Yanwube was born on December 25, 1962. He hails from Sheini, a town in the Northern Region of Ghana. He entered Lincolnshire and Humberhshide, London, UK and obtained his master's degree in Information Technology in 2000. He attended Fellowship Chartered Certified Accountant in 1997. He also attended Associates of Cost and Management Accountants and Institute of Chartered Accountants (Ghana) in 2000.

== Politics ==
Yanwube was a member of the New Patriotic Party (NPP). In 2012, he contested for the Tatale-Sanguli seat on the ticket of the NPP sixth parliament of the fourth republic and won.

== Employment ==
He is a Senior Lecturer/Dean of Graduate School, Wisconsin International University College, Accra.

He works as an accountant and financial officer.
