= Michael Teye Nyuanu =

Ghanaian politician and account officer

Hon. Michael Nyuanu Teye

Member of Parliament for Lower Manya Constituency
- In office 7 January 2005 – 6 January 2009
- President: John Agyekum Kufuor
- Preceded by: Incumbent
- Succeeded by: Ebenezer Okletey Terlabi

Personal details
- Born: 13 June 1955 (age 71) Manya Kpogunor
- Party: National Democratic Congress
- Children: four
- Education: Ghana Institute of Management and Public Administration, GIMPA
- Occupation: Business man (Transport)
- Profession: Accounts Officer

Michael Nyuanu Teye (June 13, 1955) was a member of the Second, Third and Fourth parliament of the Fourth Republic for the Lower Manya constituency in the Eastern Region of Ghana. He is also known as MTN.

== Personal life ==
Nyuanu Teye is married with four children. He is a devoted Christian and fellowships as a Baptist.

== Early life and education ==
Nyaunu Teye was born on 13 June 1955 in Manya Kpogunor in the Eastern Region of Ghana.

He attended Ghana Institute of Management and Public Administration (GIMPA) and had a post-graduate certificate in Business Administration in 2001. He also had his Executive Masters in Governance and Leadership from GIMPA.

== Career ==
He is an Account Officer by profession and he also owns a transport business (self-employed). He was also the Deputy Speaker of ECOWAS Parliament.

== Politics ==
In 1996, He was first elected into Parliament with 24,763 votes out of the 30,963 valid votes cast representing 59.50% over his opponents Kodjiku Lawerence Kpabitey an NPP member, Robert Kwesi Nartey a PNC member, Samuel Terlabie a CPP member and John Tetteh Akuerter an EGLE member who polled 5,718 votes, 482 votes, 0 vote and 0 vote respectively.

He was elected on the ticket of the National Democratic Congress and won a majority of 4,697 votes more than candidate closest in the race, to win the constituency election to become the MP. He won by attaining 53.00%. He contested with four other candidates from the New Patriotic Party (NPP), Convention People's Party (CPP), National Reform Party (NRP), and People's National Convention (PNC). Henry Derma Narh of the NPP polled 9,291 votes. CPP's representative Mr. Accam emerged third with a total votes of 1,600. Thomas Narh Batsa of the NRP attained 1,062 and Robert Nartey of the PNC had 361 votes. Their votes were equivalent to 35.50%, 6.10%,4.10% and 1.40% respectively. He was also part of the 2nd parliament of the 4th Republic of Ghana(1997).

In the 2004 Elections, He polled 18,571 votes out of the 35,248 valid votes cast representing 52.70% over his opponents Mrs Difie Agyarko Kusi an NPP member, Anim Amartey Francis Cecil a IND member, Emmanuel Kwame Adjei Okrah a CPP member, Robert Nartey Kwesi a PNC member and Cecilia Kosi Akuerter a EGLE member who polled 15,228 votes, 704 votes, 286 votes, 238 votes and 221 votes respectively.

He was also part of the former vice president campaign team. He was suspended by the NDC in the Lower Manya Krobo constituency for misconduct along with three other party members in the constituency. He also contested as an independent parliamentary candidate in the 2012 elections after forfeiting his membership of the NDC.
