= Alex Blankson =

Ghanaian politician

Hon. Alex Blankson
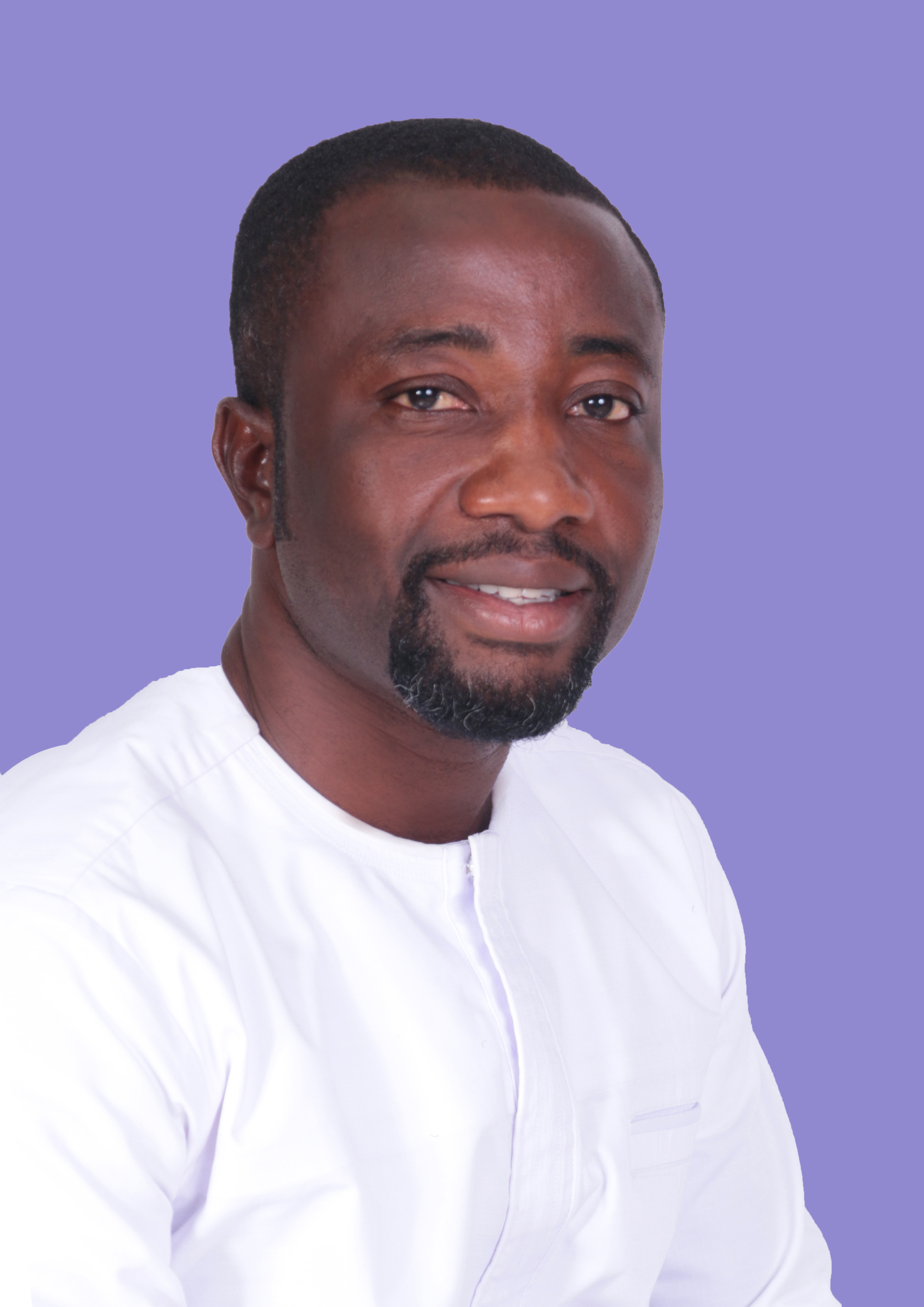

Member of Parliament for Akrofuom Constituency
- In office 7 January 2021 – 6 January 2025
- Preceded by: Samuel Abdulai Jabanyite

Personal details
- Born: Alex Blankson; 26 December 1980 (age 45) Adansi Akrofuom, Ghana
- Party: New Patriotic Party
- Occupation: Politician
- Committees: Youth, Sports and Culture Committee, Special Budget Committee

Alex Blankson (born 26 December 1980) is a Ghanaian politician and was a member of the eight parliament of the republic of Ghana who represented Akrofuom constituency of the Ashanti region. He is a member of the New Patriotic Party.

== Early life and education ==
Blankson was born on 26 December 1980. He hails from Adansi Akrofuom. Blankson attended Adisadel College and obtained his Senior Secondary School Certificate in 1999.

== Career ==
Alex was the CEO for Day by Day Healthcare Limited.

=== Political career ===
During the 2020 Ghanaian general election, Blankson contested for the Akrofuom seat with Joseph Azumah of the NDC, and Prosper Maar of NDP. He polled 11,992 votes representing 58.51% of the total valid votes against Joseph Azumah 8400 votes and Prosper Maar 103 votes, representing 41.5% and 0.5% of the total valid votes cast respectively. In 2021, Alan Kyeremanten sworn in Alex Blankson as a board member in a seven-member governing body of Ghana Heavy Equipment Limited.

==== Committees ====
Alex is a member of the Youth, Sports and Culture Committee and also a member of the Special Budget Committee.

== Personal life ==
Alex is a Christian. He is the grandson of Nana Okai Ababio.

== Philanthropy ==
In December 2021, he presented about 400 pieces of roofing sheets to aid in the completion of the Grumesa community center. In June 2021, he aided in the planting of over 9,000 trees in the Adansi Akrofuom area.
