= Okaikwei Central (Ghana parliament constituency) =

Constituency in Ghana

- constituency for the Parliament of Ghana
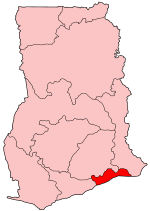
- District: Accra Metropolitan Area
- Region: Greater Accra Region of Ghana

Current constituency
- Party: New Patriotic Party
- MP: Patrick Yaw Boamah

Okaikwei Central is one of the constituencies represented in the Parliament of Ghana. It elects one Member of Parliament (MP) by the first past the post system of election. The Okaikwei Central constituency is located in the Greater Accra Region of Ghana.

== Boundaries ==
The constituency is located within the Accra Metropolis District of the Greater Accra Region of Ghana.

== Members of Parliament ==
Election	Member	Party
2012	Patrick Yaw Boamah	New Patriotic Party
2016	Patrick Yaw Boamah	New Patriotic Party
2020	Patrick Yaw Boamah	New Patriotic Party
2024	Patrick Yaw Boamah	New Patriotic Party

2016 Ghanaian general election: Okaikwei Central Source: Peacefmonline
Party	Candidates	Votes	%
NPP	Patrick Yaw Boamah	28,505	61.33
NDC	Abdul Rashid Issah	17,630	37.93
PPP	Michael Mireku Sasu	246	0.53
CPP	Sophia T. Annan	94	0.20

== See also ==
- List of Ghana Parliament constituencies
- List of political parties in Ghana
