= Gifty Klenam =

Ghanaian politician

Hon. Gifty Klenam
- Constituency: Lower West Akim

Member of Parliament
- In office 7 January 2009 – 6 January 2013
- President: John Atta Mills
- Preceded by: James Appietu-Ankrah

Personal details
- Born: 12 July 1970 (age 56)
- Party: New Patriotic Party
- Children: 2
- Education: Ghana Institute of Management and Public Administration
- Occupation: Industrialist/Farming

Gifty Klenam is a Ghanaian politician and was the member of parliament for Lower West Akim in the Eastern Region of Ghana in the 5th parliament of the 4th republic of Ghana.

== Early life and education ==
Klenam was born on July 12, 1970. She hails from Asamankese in the Eastern Region of Ghana. She obtained a certificate in Administration Management at Ghana Institute of Management and Public Administration in 2008.

== Career ==
Proior to being elected and becoming a member of parliament, Gifty Klenam is an industrialist and farmer, She was also the chief executive officer of Sunharvest Company Limited sited in Pokuase. Currently, she serves as a chairperson on the Ghana Export Promotion Authority.

== Political career ==
Klenam is member of the New Patriotic Party. She was first elected as Member of Parliament to represent Lower West Akim Constituency in the 2008 Ghanaian General Elections and she assumed office on 7 January 2009. She was re-elected in the 2012 General Elections but lost her primaries to Eyiah Kyei-Baffour in 2015 and was not able to contest in the 2016 Ghanaian General Elections.

== Elections ==
Klenam was elected in the 2008 Ghanaian general elections as the Member of parliament for the Lower West Akim constituency in the 5th parliament of the 4th republic of Ghana. She was elected on the ticket of the New Patriotic party after obtaining 21,912 votes out of the 36,337 valid votes cast, equivalent to 60.3% of total votes cast. She was elected over Yahuza Mohammed Awale of the People's National Convention, Seth Otchere of the National Democratic Congress, Nyadua Kofi Evans of the Democratic People's Party, Patrick Kwabena Adjei of the Convention People's Party and Martin Bruce Opare an independent candidate. These obtained 1.69%, 35.45%, 0.32% and 2.23% respectively of all total valid votes cast.

== Personal life ==
Klenam is married and has two children. She is a Christian who worships at the International Central Gospel Church. She has also worshipped with the Salvation Gate Chapel.
