= Sulemana Alijata =

Ghanaian politician

- Born: 25 August 1975 (age 51); Tumu, Upper West region
- Citizenship: Ghana
- Education: Rural Development College
- Occupation: Politics

Sulemana Alijata (25 August 1975) is a Ghanaian politician, social worker and former District Chief Executive/Member of Parliament for Sissala East in the Upper West region of Ghana.

== Personal life ==
Alijata is married (with children). She is a Muslim.

== Early life and education ==
Alijata was born on 25 August 1975 in Tumu in the Upper West region.

She earned her diploma in Community Development at the Rural Development College from 2005 to 2007.

== Politics ==
Alijata is a member of the National Democratic Congress. Her vision in politics was to build and empower women in the party.

She was a committee member on Gender and Children, Lands and Forestry.

== Career ==
=== District Chief Executive ===
Alijata was appointed District Chief Executive of Sissala West District from 2008 to 2013.

=== Member of Parliament ===
She served as MP for Sissala East in Ghana's Sixth Parliament (2013-2017) under the banner of the NDC. At the constituency level, she helped extend electricity to communities, lobbied for ICT access and used her Common Fund allocation to establish several Community-Based Health Planning and Services (CHPS)compounds, supplying equipment to 4 CHPS facilities. Alijata pledged 20 percent of her MP salary to breast cancer support for women in her constituency and sponsored 23 surgical operations for breast cancer patients.

She is a volunteer for the NGO People Action to Win Life All-round.
