= Nsawam Adoagyiri (Ghana parliament constituency) =

- constituency for the Parliament of Ghana
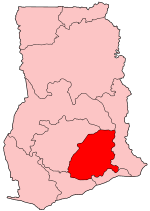
- District: Akuapim South Municipal District
- Region: Eastern Region of Ghana

Current constituency
- Party: New Patriotic Party
- MP: Frank Annoh-Dompreh

Nsawam Adoagyiri is one of the constituencies represented in the Parliament of Ghana. It elects one Member of Parliament (MP) by the first past the post system of election. Nsawam Adoagyiri is one of the constituencies created from the now defunct Aburi-Nsawam constituency in the Eastern Region of Ghana.

== Boundaries ==
The seat is located entirely within the Akuapem South Municipal Assembly of the Eastern Region of Ghana.

== Members of Parliament ==
| Election | Member | Party |
|---|---|---|
| 2012 | Frank Annoh-Dompreh | New Patriotic Party |
| 2016 | Frank Annoh-Dompreh | New Patriotic Party |

== See also ==
- List of Ghana Parliament constituencies
- Akuapim South Municipal District
