= George Kwame Aboagye =

Ghanaian politician

Hon George Kwame Aboagye
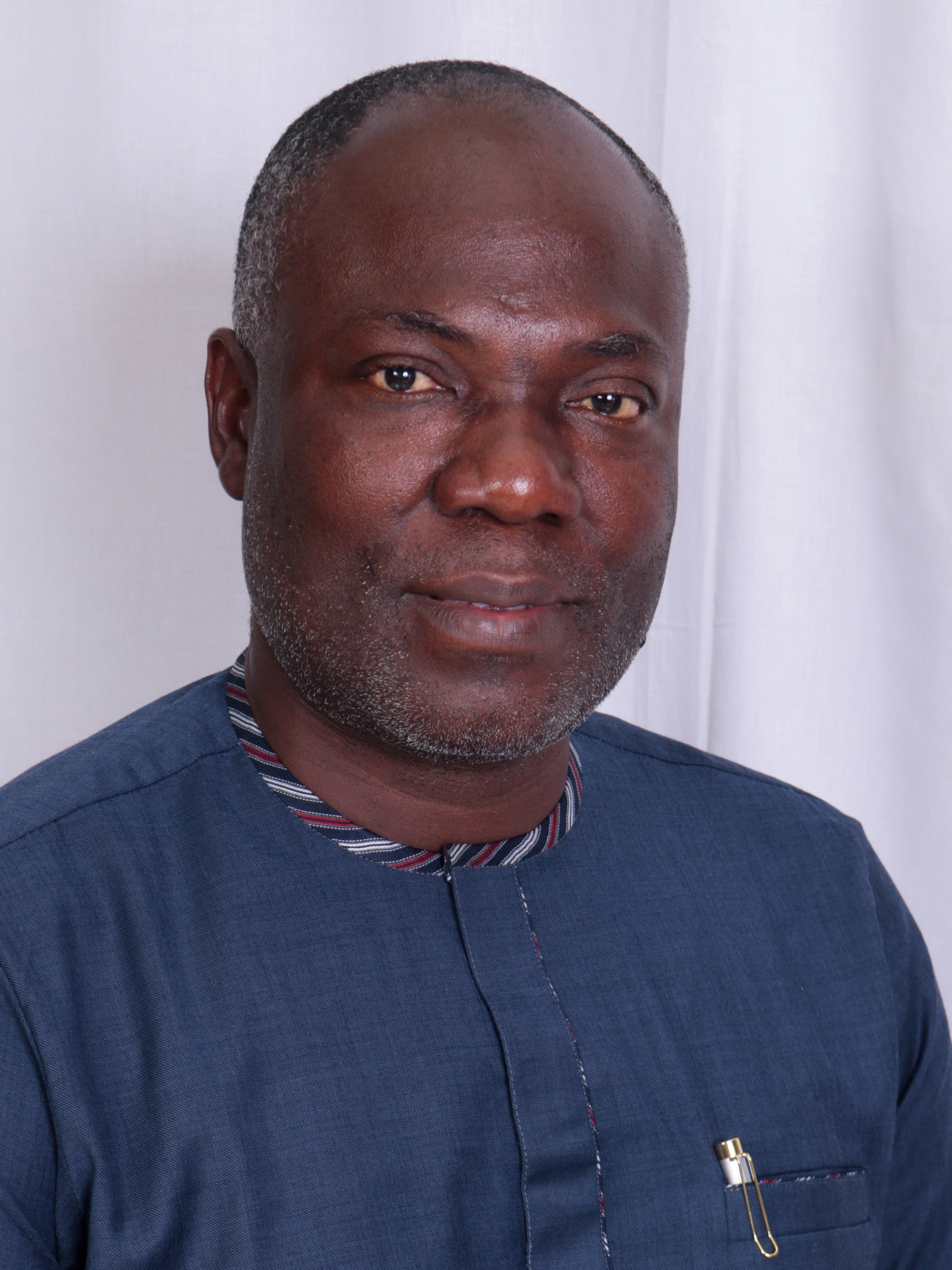

Member of the Ghana Parliament for Asene Akroso-Manso
- Incumbent
- Assumed office 7 January 2021

Personal details
- Born: Frederick Obeng Adom; August 24, 1968 (age 57) Akim Manso
- Party: New Patriotic Party
- Spouse: Mrs Aboagye
- Children: 4
- Occupation: Politician
- Committees: Lands and Forestry Committee, Poverty Reduction Strategy Committee, Environment, Science and Technology Committee

George Kwame Aboagye (born 24 August 1968) is a Ghanaian politician and member of the Seventh Parliament of the Fourth Republic of Ghana representing the Asene-Akroso-Manso Constituency in the Eastern Region on the ticket of the New Patriotic Party.

== Early life and education ==
Aboagye was born on 24 August 1968 at Akim Manso in the Eastern region of Ghana. In 1987, he obtained a certificate in mechanical engineering, he also earned his diploma at Zenith University college and his LLB at Lancaster University, Ghana campus.

== Career ==
He was the chief executive officer at Geospence Ghana Limited from 2008 to 2016.

== Personal life ==
Aboagye identifies as a Christian and an elder at the Church of Pentecost. He is married with four children.

== Politics ==
Aboagye won the seat of Asene-Akroso-Manso constituency on the ticket of the New Patriotic Party by obtaining 21,148 votes out of 31,078 valid votes cast, which is equal to 68.44%. He was then nominated to join the land and forestry committee and members holding offices of profits committee.
