= Asene Akroso-Manso (Ghana parliament constituency) =

Constituency in the Eastern Region, Ghana

- constituency for the Parliament of Ghana
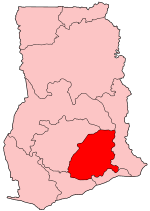
- District: Birim Central Municipal District
- Region: Eastern Region of Ghana

Current constituency
- Party: New Patriotic Party
- MP: George Kwame Aboagye

Asene Akroso-Manso is one of the constituencies represented in the Parliament of Ghana. It elects one Member of Parliament (MP) by the first past the post system of election. Asene Akroso-Manso was one of the constituencies created before the 2012 general elections in Ghana.

== Boundaries ==
The seat is located entirely within the Birim Central Municipal Assembly of the Eastern Region of Ghana.

== Members of Parliament ==
Election	Member	Party
2012	Yaw Owusu-Boateng	New Patriotic Party
2016	George Kwame Aboagye	New Patriotic Party

== See also ==
- List of Ghana Parliament constituencies
- Birim Central Municipal District
