= Tain (Ghana parliament constituency) =

Constituency in the Bono Region of Ghana

- constituency for the Parliament of Ghana
- District: Tain District
- Region: Bono Region of Ghana

Current constituency
- Party: New Patriotic Party
- MP: Adama Sulemana

Tain is one of the constituencies represented in the Parliament of Ghana. It was created in 2004. It elects one Member of Parliament (MP) by the first past the post system of election. Tain is located in the Bono Region of Ghana.

== Boundaries ==
The seat is located within the Tain District of the Bono Region of Ghana.

== Members of Parliament ==
Election	Member	Party
2016	GABRIEL OSEI	NPP
2012	KWASI AGYEMANG GYAN-TUTU	NDC

== Elections ==
Ghanaian parliamentary election, 2016 : Tain Source : Peacefmonline
Party	Candidate	Votes	%
NPP	GABRIEL OSEI	14,569	45.66
NDC	KWASI AGYEMANG GYAN-TUTU	14,528	45.54
NDP	JONES TANNOR	2,477	7.76
PPP	BEKOE PAUL	251	0.79
CPP	ADJEIWAA RITA	80	0.25

Ghanaian parliamentary election, 2012 : Tain Source : Peacefmonline
Party	Candidate	Votes	%
NDC	KWASI AGYEMANG GYAN-TUTU	17,403	56.05
NPP	JOSEPH OFORI AMANFO	13,035	41.98
PPP	TWUM KWAME ERIC	429	1.38
NDP	SIED ISHAQ HAMZA	181	0.58

== See also ==
- List of Ghana Parliament constituencies
- List of political parties in Ghana
