= Upper West Akim =

Ghana parliament constituency

- constituency for the Parliament of Ghana
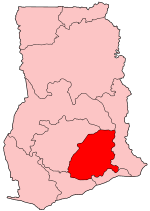
- District: West Akim District
- Region: Eastern Region of Ghana

Current constituency
- Party: National Democratic Congress (NDC)
- MP: Emmanuel Drah

The Upper West Akim constituency is in the Eastern region of Ghana. The current member of Parliament for the constituency is Emmanuel Drah. He was elected on the ticket of the National Democratic Congress and won a majority of 22,759 votes to win the constituency election to become the MP. He succeeded Frederick Obeng Adom who had represented the constituency in the 8th parliament of the 4th Republican parliament also on the ticket of the (NDC). The capital is Adeiso.

== List of MPs ==
Year	Member of Parliament	Political Party	Votes	President
2000	Samuel Sallas Mensah	National Democratic Congress (Ghana)	12,150	John Kufuor
2004	Samuel Sallas Mensah	National Democratic Congress (Ghana)	14,064	John Kufuor
2008	Joseph Amankwanor	National Democratic Congress (Ghana)	15,309	John Atta Mills
2012	Joseph Amankwanor	National Democratic Congress (Ghana)	18,736	John Mahama
2016	Derek Darko Ohene Assifo Bekoe	National Democratic Congress (Ghana)	17,091	Nana Akufo-Addo
2020	Frederick Obeng Adom	New Patriotic Party	21,863	Nana Akufo-Addo
2024	Emmanuel Drah	National Democratic Congress (Ghana)	22,759	John Mahama

== See also ==
- List of Ghana Parliament constituencies

https://web.archive.org/web/20101208084535/http://www.ghanamps.gov.gh/mps/details.php?id=64
