= Adusei Kwasi =

Ghanaian politician

Adusei Kwasi (born 20 October 1976) is a Ghanaian politician and member of the 6th parliament of the 4th republic of Ghana.

== Early and personal life ==
Kwasi was born on 20 October 1976 in the town of Tatale in the Northern Region of Ghana. He earned his Higher National Diploma in Education from Sunyani Polytechnic, Sunyani (now Sunyani Technical University) in 2010 where he majored in Electrical Engineering.

He is an educationalist by profession. He is married with three children.

== Career ==
Kwasi represents Ahafo Ano North constituency in the Ashanti Region of Ghana. He obtained 50.02% of the votes cast for National Democratic Congress (NDC). He began his tenure on 7 January 2013 after the completion of the 2012 general elections and ended on 6 January 2017 after the dissolution of the parliament.
