= Anthony Osei Boakye =

Ghanaian politician

Anthony Osei Boakye (born 15 October 1949) is a Ghanaian politician and a member of the Sixth Parliament of the Fourth Republic of Ghana representing Atwima Nwabiagya South in the Ashanti Region of Ghana.

== Personal life and education ==
Boakye was born on 15 October 1949 in a town known as Toase. He earned his Bachelor of Science degree in education from the University of Cape Coast in 1977.

Boakye was the immediate past managing director of Produce Buying Company Limited.

Boakye is a Christian and is married with three children and seven grandchildren.

== Political career ==
Boakye was elected into the sixth parliament of the fourth republic of Ghana on 7 January 2013 after the completion of the 2012 Ghanaian general election, where he obtained 74.29% of the valid votes cast. He served until 6 January 2017.
