= Lower West Akim (Ghana parliament constituency) =

Constituency in Ghana

- constituency for the Parliament of Ghana
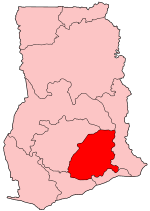
- District: West Akim District
- Region: Eastern Region of Ghana

Current constituency
- Party: National Democratic Congress
- MP: Owen Kwame Frimpong

The Lower West Akim constituency is in the Eastern region of Ghana. The current member of Parliament for the constituency is Owen Kwame Frimpong. He was elected on the ticket of the National Democratic Congress (NDC) who finished ahead of the next candidate. He succeeded Gifty Klenam who had represented the constituency in the 4th Republican parliament on the ticket of the NPP.

== See also ==
- List of Ghana Parliament constituencies
