= Akrofuom (Ghana parliament constituency) =

Constituency in the Ashanti Region of Ghana

- constituency for the Parliament of Ghana
- District: Obuasi Municipal District
- Region: Ashanti Region of Ghana

Current constituency
- Created: 2004
- Party: National Democratic Congress
- MP: Joseph Azumah

Akrofuom is one of the constituencies represented in the Parliament of Ghana. It elects one Member of Parliament (MP) by the first past the post system of election. Joseph Azumah is the member of parliament for the constituency. Akrofuom is located in the Obuasi Municipal District of the Ashanti Region of Ghana.

This seat was created prior to the Ghanaian parliamentary election in 2004.

== Boundaries ==
The seat is located within the Obuasi Municipal District of the Ashanti Region of Ghana.

== History ==
The constituency was first created in 2004 by the Electoral Commission of Ghana along with 29 other new ones, increasing the number of constituencies from 200 to 230.

== Members of Parliament ==
Election	Member	Party
2004	Constituency created	
2004	Kwabena Appiah-Pinkrah	New Patriotic Party
2008	Kwabena Appiah-Pinkrah	New Patriotic Party
2012	Kwabena Appiah-Pinkrah	New Patriotic Party
2016	Kwabena Appiah-Pinkrah	New Patriotic Party
2020	Alex Blankson	New Patriotic Party

== Elections ==
2004 Ghanaian parliamentary election:Akrofuom Source:Ghana Home Page
Party	Candidate	Votes	%	±%
New Patriotic Party	Kwabena Appiah-Pinkrah	10,808	70.4	N/A
National Democratic Congress	Joseph Kwaku Abim	4,535	29.6	N/A
Majority		6,273	40.8	N/A

== See also ==
- List of Ghana Parliament constituencies
