= Abrah Comfort Rosemond =

Ghanaian politician

Hon. Abrah Comfort Rosemond

Member of the Ghana Parliament for Weija Gbawe constituency

Personal details
- Born: 16 July 1950 (age 76)
- Party: New Patriotic Party
- Children: Two
- Education: University of Cape Coast, 2002
- Profession: Educationist

Abrah Comfort Rosemond (July 16, 1960) is a female Ghanaian politician. She was the member of parliament for the Weija Gbawe Constituency.

== Early life and education ==
She obtained an MPhil (guidance and counseling) from the University of Cape Coast in 2002.

== Career ==
Comfort is also a trained educationist and was appointed district director of the Kwaebibirem District Office of the GES. She won the 2012 parliamentary elections with 32,861 votes representing 53.59% of the total votes cast on the ticket of the New Patriotic Party (NPP).

== Personal life ==
Comfort Rosemond is married with two children.
