= Joseph Amankwanor =

Ghanaian politician

Joseph Sam Amankwanor (born October 14, 1954) is a Ghanaian politician and the current member of the Parliament of Ghana representing the Upper West Akim constituency. On January 22, 2012, he won the primary election within the National Democratic Congress; He was a member of the 5th and 6th parliament of the Republic of Ghana.

== Personal life ==
Amankwanor is a Christian (Royal House Church). He is married with five children.

== Early life and education ==
Amankwanor was born on October 14, 1954. He hails from Adeiso, a town in the Eastern Region of Ghana. He is an alumnus of the Institute of the Motor Industry, London and obtained his certificate in 1980.

== Political career ==
Amankwanor is a member of the National Democratic Congress (NDC). He was first elected into office in December 2008 polling 18,736 votes out of 34,741 valid votes. He represented Upper West Akim constituency in the 5th parliament of the 4th Republic of Ghana. He served the second term in office after he was re-elected in the 2012 Ghanaian general election by obtaining 15,308 votes out of 28,517 valid votes in his constituency.
