= Daboya-Mankarigu (Ghana parliament constituency) =

Parliamentary constituency in Ghana

- constituency for the Parliament of Ghana
- District: West Gonja District
- Region: Savannah Region of Ghana

Current constituency
- Party: National Democratic Congress
- MP: Shaibu Mahama

Daboya-Mankarigu is one of the constituencies represented in the Parliament of Ghana. It elects one Member of Parliament (MP) by a first past the post system of election. Shaibu Mahama is the member of parliament for the constituency. The Daboya-Mankarigu constituency is located in the West Gonja District of the Savannah Region of Ghana.

He succeeded Mahama Asei Seini who was elected as a member of parliament for the constituency on the ticket of New Patriotic Party during the 2020 Ghanaian general election.

== Boundaries ==
The seat is located entirely within the West Gonja District of the Savannah Region of Ghana.

== Members of Parliament ==
Election	Member	Party
2016	Shaibu Mahama	NDC

Ghanaian parliamentary election, 2016 : Daboya-Mankarigu. Source:Peacefmonline
Party	Candidates	Votes	%
NDC	Shaibu Mahama	9,208	51.46
NPP	Tika Samuel Yeyu	8,589	48.00
CPP	Alidu Mahama	95	0.53

The table below shows the parliamentary election results for Daboya Mankarigu constituency in the 2020 Ghanaian general election.

== See also ==
- List of Ghana Parliament constituencies
- List of political parties in Ghana
