= Patrick Yaw Boamah =

Ghanaian politician

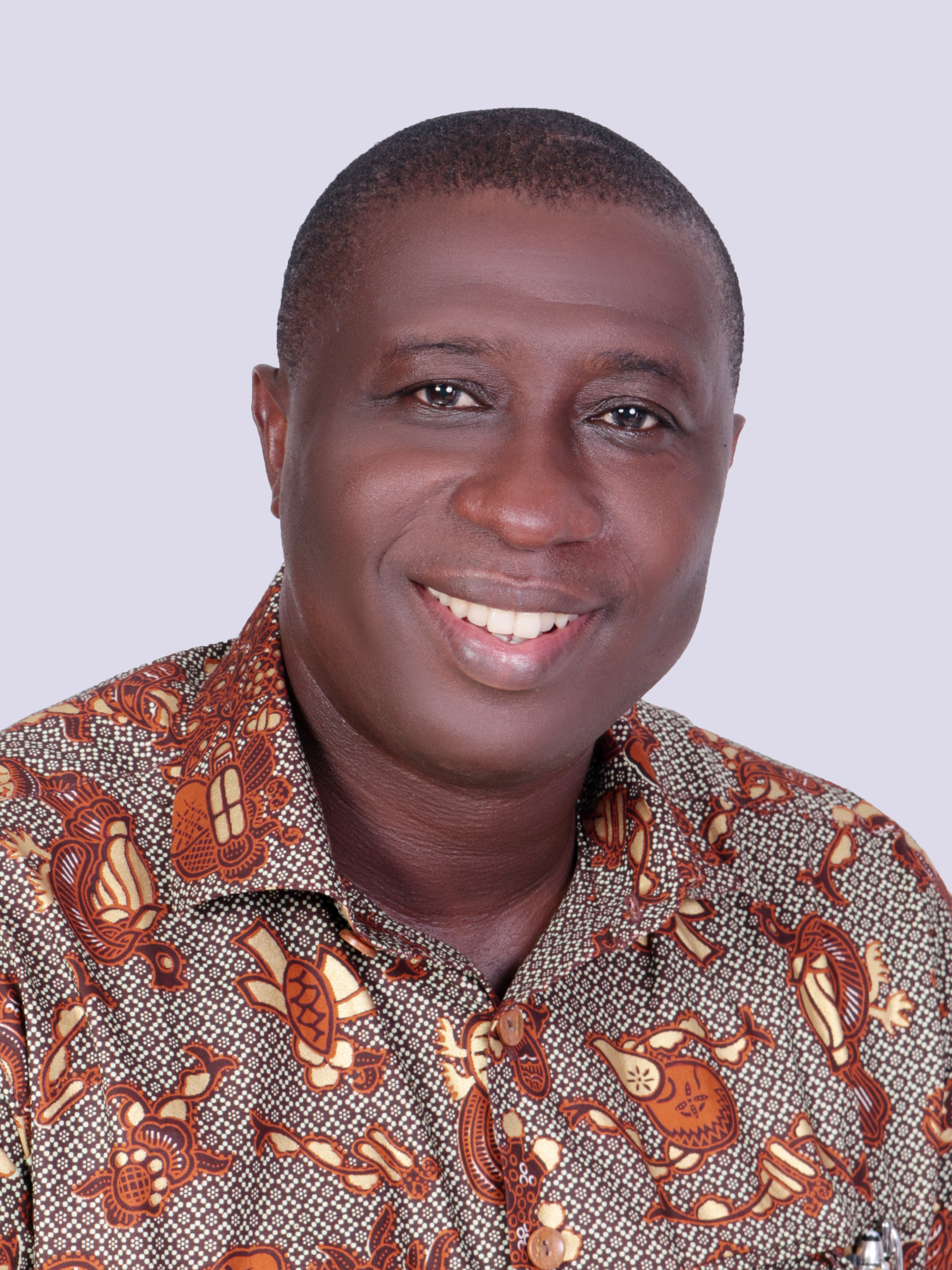

Member of the Ghana Parliament for Okaikwei Central Constituency
- Incumbent
- Assumed office 7 January 2013
- Preceded by: New

Personal details
- Born: 19 September 1974 (age 51)
- Party: New Patriotic Party
- Education: University of Ghana; Ghana School of Law
- Occupation: Politician
- Profession: Lawyer

Patrick Yaw Boamah (born 1974) is a Ghanaian politician and member of the 8th Parliament of the Fourth Republic of Ghana representing the Okaikwei Central Constituency in the Greater Accra Region on the ticket of the New Patriotic Party.

== Early life and education ==
Boamah was born on 19 September 1974. He hails from Mourso-Effiduase, in the Ashanti Region of Ghana. He obtained his bachelor of laws and master's degree in international affairs from the University of Ghana in 2004 and 2005 respectively. He later proceeded to the Ghana School of Law where he received his barrister-at-law degree in 2009. He attained his LLB from University of Ghana in 2008.

== Career ==
Boamah is a lawyer by profession. Before entering politics, he was an associate at the Sam Okudzato and Associates law firm. He was also a lawyer at Boamah & Partners.

== Politics ==
Boamah entered parliament on 7 January 2013 on the ticket of the New Patriotic Party representing the Okaikwei Central Constituency. He was re-elected in the 2016 ,2020 and 2024 Ghanaian General Election to represent the constituency for a second consecutive term.

In parliament, he has served on various committees, some of which include; the Subsidiary Legislation Committee, the Judiciary Committee, and the Foreign Affairs Committee.

He contested in the 2020 Ghanaian General Election as the parliamentary candidate for the New Patriotic Party and he won.

He is currently the vice chairman of the financial committee and a member of standing order and appointment committees of the Parliament.

Boamah is a member of the Ghana Bar Association, Commonwealth Lawyers Association, He worked as an associate for five years at Sam Okudzeto & Associate, a leading law firm in Accra. He led a legal practice called Boamah & Partners, which he established in 2013.

== Personal life ==
Boamah is married with two children. He identifies as a Christian and a member of the Methodist Church of Ghana.
