= Zabzugu-Tatale (Ghana parliament constituency) =

Ghana parliament constituency

Coordinates: 9°30′N 1°00′W

- constituency for the Parliament of Ghana
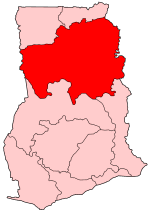
- District: Zabzugu/Tatale District
- Region: Northern Region of Ghana

Current constituency
- Party: New Patriotic Party (NPP)
- MP: Jabaah John Bennam

Zabzugu-Tatale is one of the constituencies represented in the Parliament of Ghana. It elects one Member of Parliament (MP) by the first past the post system of election. It is located in the Northern Region of Ghana. The current member of Parliament for the constituency is Jabaah John Bennam. He was elected on the ticket of the New Patriotic Party (NPP) and won a majority of 6,654 votes more than candidate closest in the race, to win the constituency election to become the MP. He succeeded Mohammed Jagrihad represented the constituency in the 4th Republican parliament on the ticket of the National Democratic Congress.

== See also ==
- List of Ghana Parliament constituencies
