= Jabaah John Bennam =

Ghanaian politician

Hon. Jabaah John Bennam
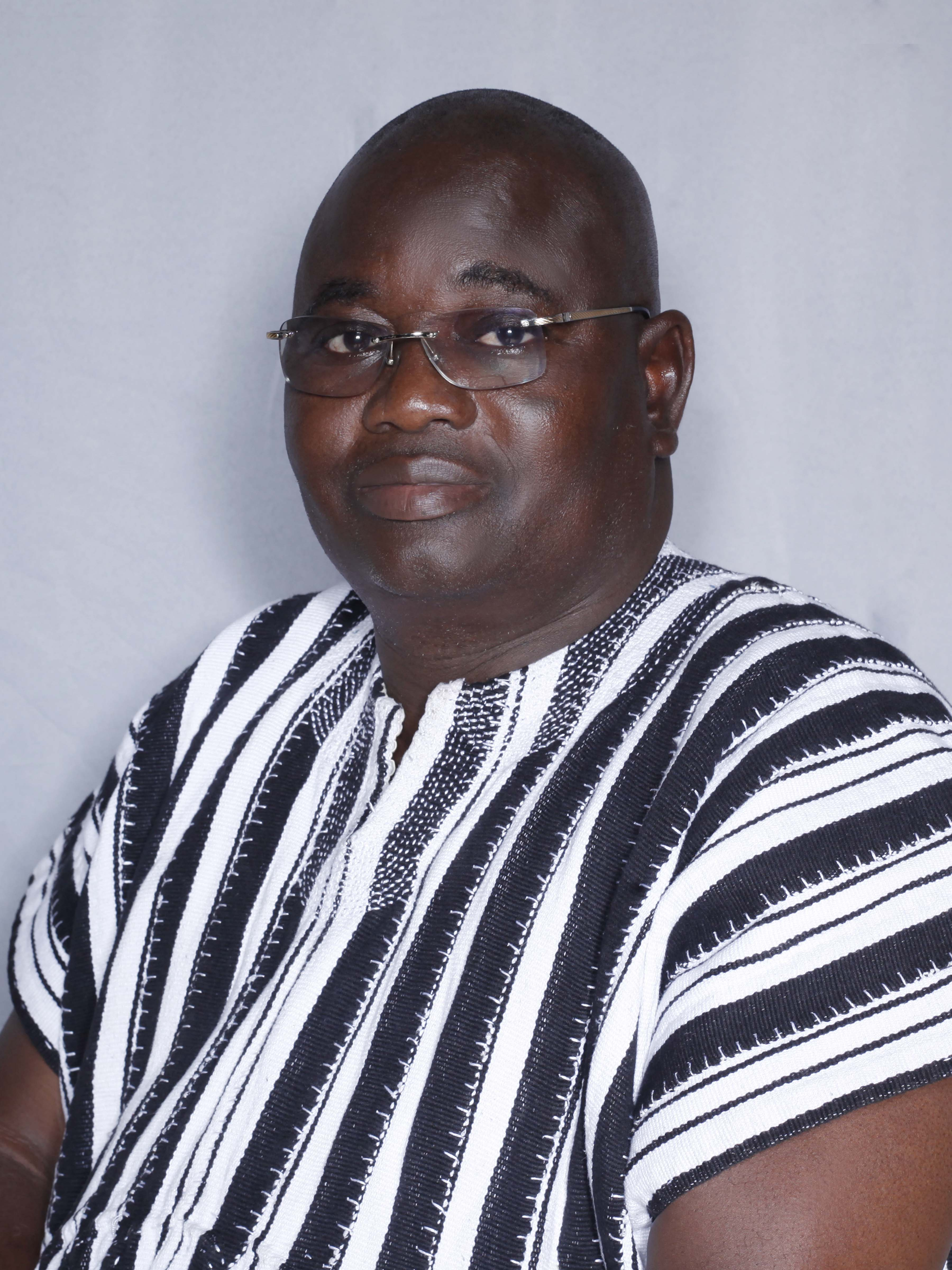

Member of the Ghana Parliament for Zabzugu-Tatale Constituency
- In office 7 January 2009 – 6 January 2017
- Preceded by: Mohammed Jagri
- Succeeded by: Alhassan Umar

Personal details
- Born: 4 May 1965 (age 61) Ghana
- Party: New Patriotic Party
- Education: University of Education, Winneba; University of Phoenix

Jabaah John Bennam (born 1965) is a Ghanaian politician who served as the member of parliament for the Zabzugu-Tatale Constituency from 7 January 2009 to 6 January 2017.

== Early life and education ==
Bennam was born on 4 May 1965. He hails from Kuntumbiyile a town in the Northern Region of Ghana. He received his diploma in basic education from University of Education, Winneba, and his Bachelor of Business Administration (BBA) degree and master's degree in Project Management from the University of Phoenix, Phoenix, Arizona, United States in 2009 and 2012 respectively.

== Career ==
Bennam was the Deputy Manager of Ghana Co-operative Market from 1990 to 1993. From 1993 to 2001 he became self-employed as a sole entrepreneur.

== Politics ==
Bennam served as a Deputy Minister from 2001 to 2005. He entered parliament on 7 January 2013 on the ticket of the New Patriotic Party to represent the Zabzugu-Tatale Constituency. He served in that capacity for two consecutive terms. In 2016, he lost the seat to Alhassan Umar of the National Democratic Congress.

== Personal life ==
Bennam is married with seven children. He identifies as a Christian.
