= Michael Coffie Boampong =

Ghanaian accountant and politician

- Succeeded by: Augustine Tawiah

MP for Bia West
- In office 7 January 2009 – 6 January 2013
- President: John Evans Atta Mills

Personal details
- Born: 6 March 1962
- Died: 29 January 2018 (aged 55)
- Party: National Democratic Congress
- Children: 6
- Education: Kumasi Polytechnic
- Occupation: Politician
- Profession: Accountant

Michael Coffie Boampong (6 March 1962 – 29 January 2018) was an Accountant and Ghanaian politician and member of the Sixth Parliament of the Fourth Republic of Ghana representing the Bia West Constituency in the Western Region on the ticket of the National Democratic Congress.

== Early life and education ==
Boampong was born on 6 March 1962. He hailed from Sefwi Essam, a town in the Western Region of Ghana. He graduated from the Kumasi Polytechnic, Ghana, and obtained his Diploma in Business Studies (Accounting Option) in 1987.

== Politics ==
Boampong was a member of the National Democratic Congress (NDC). He became MP representing Bia West Constituency in January 2001 and had a run of three consecutive terms afterwards. In 2012, he contested for the Bia West seat on the ticket of the NDC Sixth Parliament of the Fourth Republic and won, which was his last term in office. He was a committee member on the committees for Poverty Reduction Strategy, Roads and Transport, and the Special Budget Committee.

Boampong was elected as the Member of Parliament for the Bia West constituency in the Western Region of Ghana in the 2000 Ghanaian general elections. He therefore represented the constituency in the 4th parliament of the 4th republic of Ghana. He was elected with 24,267 votes out of the total votes cast. This is equivalent to 68.50% of the total valid votes cast. He was elected over Benjamin Armah of the New Patriotic Party and Albert Adomako of the Convention People's Party. These two obtained 11,179 and 0 votes respectively of the total valid votes cast. These were equivalent to 31.50% and 0.00% respectively of the total valid votes cast. Boampong was elected on the ticket of the National Democratic Congress. The National Democratic Congress won a total of nine parliamentary seats in the Western Region in that elections. In all, the party won a minority total of 89 parliamentary representation out of 200 seats in the 3rd Parliament of the 4th Republic of Ghana.

== Career ==
Boampong worked as an accountant. He was an Assistant Inspector of Taxes at the IRS. He was an MP since January 2001.

== Personal life ==
Boampong was married and had six children. He was a Christian (Methodist).

== Death ==
Boampong died on 29 January 2018 on admission at the 37 Military Hospital, Accra after a short illness.
