= Kintampo South (Ghana parliament constituency) =

Constituency in the Bono East Region of Ghana

- constituency for the Parliament of Ghana
- Region: Bono East Region of Ghana

Current constituency
- Party: National Democratic Congress
- MP: Felicia Adjei

Kintampo South is one of the constituencies represented in the Parliament of Ghana. It elects one Member of Parliament (MP) by the first past the post system of election.

Felicia Adjei is the member of parliament for the constituency. She was elected on the ticket of the National Democratic Congress. She succeeded Alexander Gyan.

== See also ==
- List of Ghana Parliament constituencies
