= 2017 Atomic Junction gas explosion =

2017 fatal accident in Ghana

Atomic Junction Gas Explosion
- Date: 7 October 2017
- Location: Atomic Junction near Madina, Greater Accra Region, Ghana; 5°40′0.9″N 0°10′41.0″W
- Cause: Explosion
- Deaths: At least 7
- Injuries: At least 132

On 7 October 2017, an offloading petrol tanker located at the state-owned Ghana Oil Company (GOIL) caught fire resulting in a large-scale explosion at the site of a liquefied natural gas station located at Atomic Junction in Madina, Accra, Ghana.

The explosion was not isolated to the tanker at the station, with the fire promptly radiating towards a cooking gas depot situated next door. The Ministry of Information released a formal statement that confirmed seven people had been killed and 132 people were injured during the blast..

Residents of the busy intersection in northeast Accra were forced to flee as the blasts were followed by a giant fireball erupting into the sky over eastern Accra.

The Interior Minister, Hon. Ambrose Dery MP, attended the scene alongside other government officials and emergency service personnel from the Atomic Fire Brigade, Ghana National Fire Service, Ghana Police Service, and the National Disaster Management Organisation to monitor the situation. In the aftermath of the explosion, a constituency official delivered a statement to the Parliament of Ghana in which they addressed the threats posed to the public because of recurrent gas explosions in the region, including the threat to human lives, subsequent damage to properties and businesses, declines in available resources and nationwide job shortages. As a result of the quantity of both lives and properties lost, a statement was read in parliament encouraging the consideration of the relocation of such liquefied natural gas stations to the outside of residential regions and spaces accessible by the public. On 8 October 2017, Mahamudu Bawumia, the Vice President of Ghana, addressed the public during a press conference vowing a national response in the aftermath of the explosion to put new policies and procedures into action to minimise the risk of similar incidents occurring in the future.

== Explosion ==
The news gathered from the explosion reports that the Gas station exploded first before affecting a Total Filling Station nearby which also caught fire. There were a number of fatalities, with at least seven deaths and 192 injuries being reported. Students from Presbyterian Boys' Senior High School, Legon and University of Ghana who were close to the explosion sites quickly fled from their hostels in fear, creating a stampede which injured many students. Residents around Madina and Haatso in Accra who were also close to the explosion zone were also being evacuated. As of 7 October 2017, personnel from the Ghana National Fire Service, Ghana Police Service and National Disaster Management Organisation were onsite trying to put the fire under control. As of 7 October 2017, the source of the explosion was not known. The total cost of property destroyed is estimated to be GHS 1,503,010.

== Response ==
=== Local Response ===
On 7 October 2017, media coverage of the Atomic Junction Gas Explosion portrayed the incident as promptly under control, with the Atomic Fire Brigade praised for their swift response. However, this media coverage of events was met with scepticism by residents who believed that the media had deliberately exaggerated the success of the actions of the Atomic Fire Brigade in controlling the explosion. It was speculated that the media acted in such a way to prevent mass hysteria and uncoordinated evacuation efforts in response to the imminent threat to the public due to numerous underground petrol tanks situated in the surrounding area. The humanitarian response orchestrated in the immediate aftermath of the explosion saw the Interior Minister, government officials and emergency services personnel attend the scene to assess the situation, with 7 deaths and 132 injured casualties confirmed by the 37 military hospitals that became receiving centres for victims of the incident.

=== National Response ===
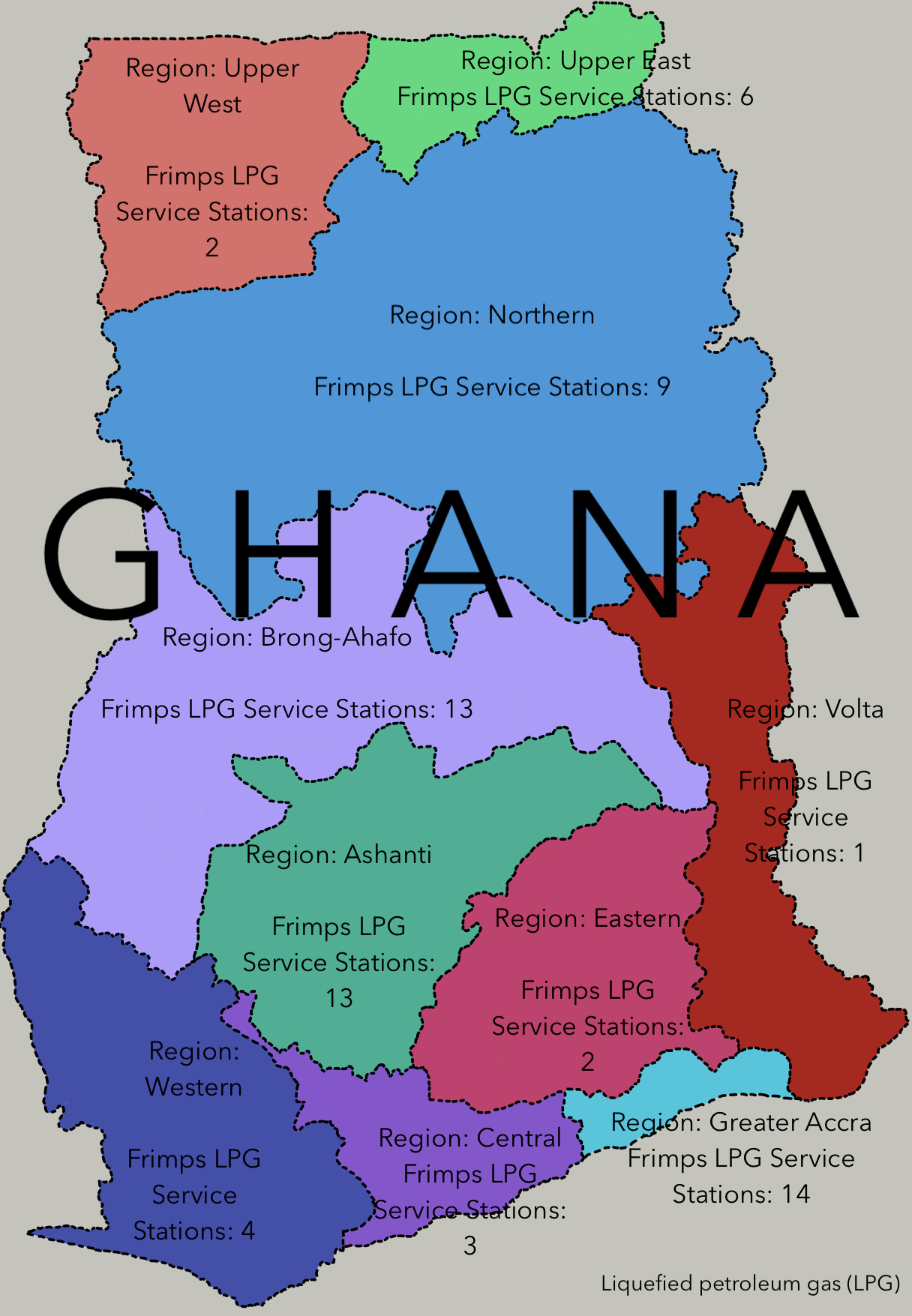
The regional distribution of liquid petroleum gas (LPG) service stations operated by Frimps Oil, a National Petroleum Authority (NPA) accredited Oil Marketing Company (OMC), across Ghana.

The aftermath of the explosion saw the honourable member for Manhyia North Constituency, Collins Owusu Amankwah, take to the floor of the Parliament of Ghana to address the avoidant response of national agencies to prevent the reoccurring incidence of gas explosions across Ghana. National records documented 252 deaths over a 12-year period due to gas explosions across the nation and remained critical of the ingenuine motivations of Gas Station operators. He cited that the guidelines published by the National Petroleum Authority (NPA) stated that gas and fuel stations should remain a minimum of 30.8 meters away from any residential area. It was suggested that the absence of any legislation backed by law to enforce these guidelines had enabled fuel and gas operators to ignore abiding by them; with the lack of legal repercussions resulting in deaths in residential areas following gas explosions. Amankwah called on parliament to assemble the appropriate committee to enforce regulatory legislation under Article 103(3) of the 1992 Republican Constitution.

== Ways the 2017 atomic junction gas explosion relevant by the geographical proximity ==
- 2015 Accra explosion
- Atomic Junction Gas Explosion
- 2022 Bogoso explosion
