= 2022 Bogoso explosion =

Deadly accident in Western Region, Ghana

Bogoso explosion
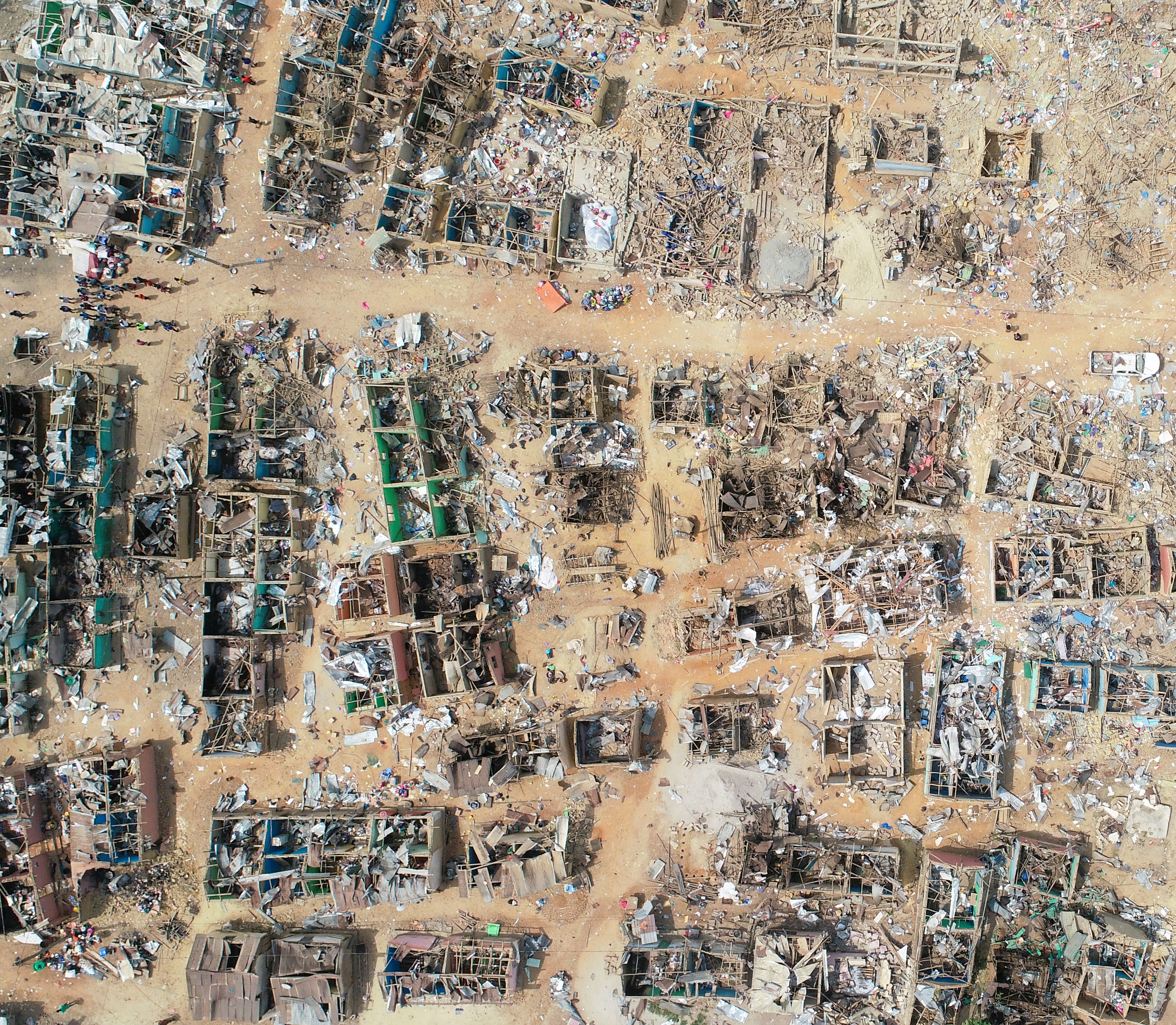
- Aftermath of explosion
- Date: 20 January 2022 (4 years ago)
- Location: Apiate near Bogoso, Western Region, Ghana; 05°35′06″N 02°02′47″W
- Cause: Collision
- Deaths: 13
- Injuries: 200

On 20 January 2022, a large explosion occurred in Apiate, a suburban community near Bogoso in the Western Region of Ghana, after a truck transporting mining explosives collided with a motorcycle. The explosion leveled the community, killing 13 people and injuring 200.

== Explosion ==
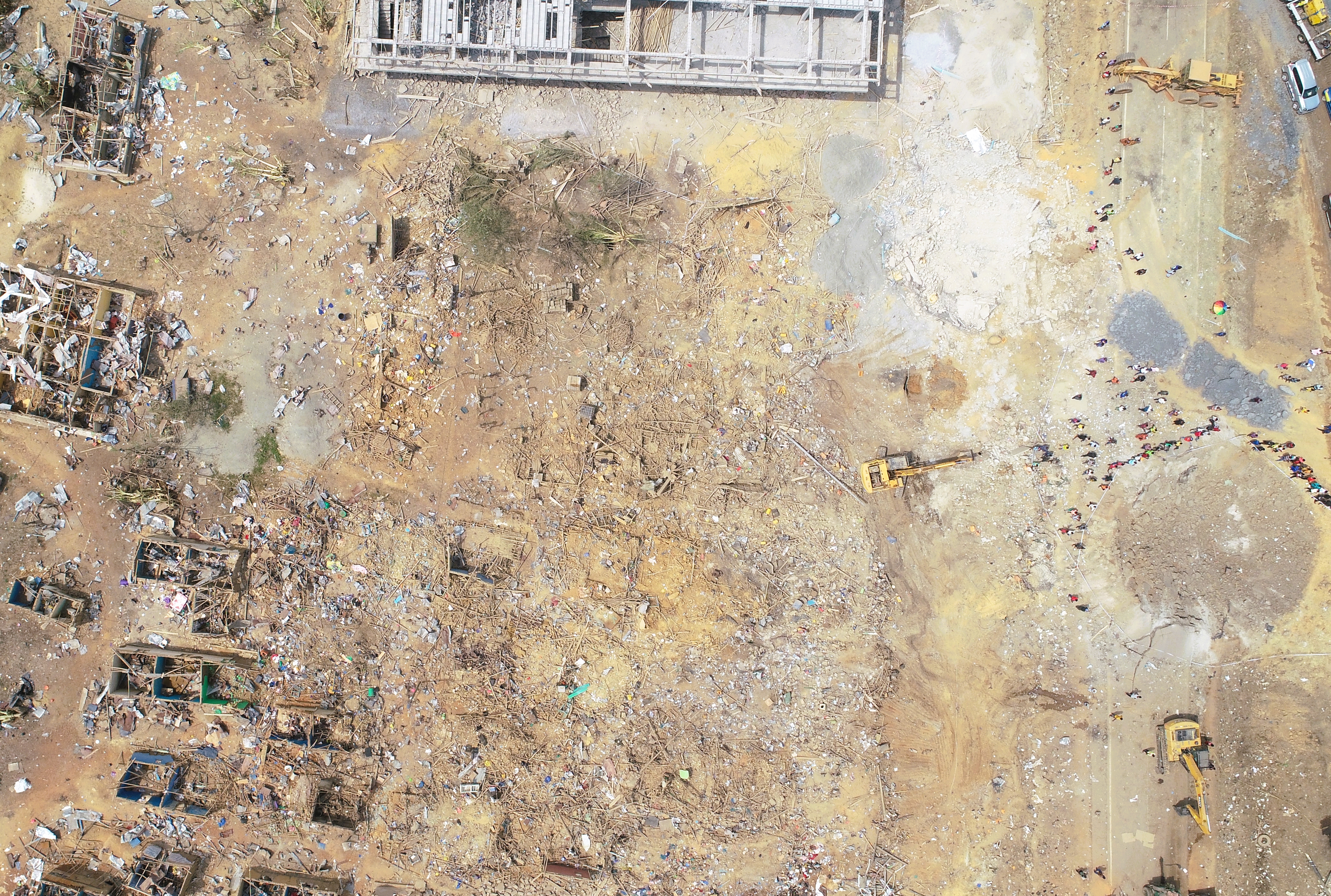
Large crater left in road after explosion

The explosion occurred on the Tarkwa-Bogoso-Ayamfuri road on 20 January 2022 after a truck operated by Maxam transporting 10 tons of mining explosives between Tarkwa and Chirano collided head-on with a motorcycle. The motorcycle was then driven over by the truck which was en route to the Kinross Gold-owned Chirano Gold Mine. The collision occurred at around 1:25 pm with the explosion coming about 45 minutes later. Emergency services had not reached the scene before the vehicle exploded.

A police spokesman said that the truck was escorted by a Maxam security car in front of it and a police vehicle behind it. The police also stated that the driver of the truck had noticed a fire after the collision and, with the escorting police officer, rushed to alert people nearby to run to safety including a nearby school and petrol station. This account of events was disputed by some locals, who stated that they had not seen any escort vehicles.

Many people were nearby taking photographs and videos of the incident when the truck exploded. The blast created a 20-metre (66 ft) wide crater in the road.

The explosion affected the nearby Apiate village. The blast destroyed several buildings and left a large crater in the road. At least 13 people were killed and 200 injured, of whom 45 received in-patient treatment. The National Disaster Management Organization stated that 500 buildings have been damaged in the explosion and some people were trapped by the collapse of structures. Others were damaged by fire in the aftermath of the explosion. At least 380 residents were left without shelter. Around 100 road vehicles were also damaged by the blast. A Power Distribution Services Ghana (PDSG) electricity transformer was located close to the site of the incident and was badly damaged. This and other electricity infrastructure damage cut power to around 30,000 people and would cost more than 1 million Ghanaian cedi to repair.

Despite initial reports that he died, the motorcyclist survived the crash and was taken to hospital. The truck driver sustained a deep cut to the head in the incident and was also taken to hospital. The explosive truck's police escort driver was unhurt, though his vehicle was thrown a significant distance by the explosion.

== Response ==
Ghanaian police and army explosives experts were sent to the scene to avoid the risk of a second explosion. Police requested that local residents "move out of the area to nearby towns for their safety while recovery efforts are underway" and requested that nearby communities "open up their classrooms, churches etc to accommodate surviving victims".

Casualties were taken to the nearby Aseda Hospital, as well as a health centre in Bogoso, hospitals in Tarkwa and the Effia Nkwanta Regional Hospital in Takoradi. The Ghana National Fire and Rescue Service brought an excavator to the scene to assist with recovery efforts. PDSG restored power to all affected residents, outside of Apiatse, within 48 hours of the explosion.

To prevent fraudulent activities, NADMO set up a 17-member committee, including six people who survived the explosion and are residents of Apeatse, to help in the distribution of relief items.

=== Government ===
The Ministry of Lands and Natural Resources launched the Appiatse Endowment Fund to support people affected by the explosion. Samuel Abu Jinapor claimed its establishment would help in the rebuilding of the community. A five-member committee was launched to check and coordinate materials for rebuilding the community. In May 2024, Mahamudu Bawumia commissioned more than 120 housing units that were completed for occupancy at Appiatse.

=== Fine ===
In February 2022, Africanews reported that Maxam Ghana had agreed to pay a $6 million fine for "breaches regarding the manufacture, storage, and transportation of explosives". Conditions were also set by the Lands minister, Samuel Abu Jinapor that Maxam must meet before their operating permit was restored. However, industry experts in Ghana are apprehensive on the effect of the fine on the mining economy in Ghana

== See also ==
- 2015 Accra explosion
- Atomic Junction Gas Explosion
