= Ghana Immigration Service =

Ghanaian government agency

- Emblem of the Ghana Immigration Service

Department overview
- Formed: 1989
- Jurisdiction: Republic of Ghana
- Headquarters: Independence Avenue, Accra, Greater Accra, Ghana
- Minister responsible: Muntaka Mohammad-Mubarak, Minister for the Interior
- Department executive: Samuel Basintale Amadu, Comptroller-General Of Immigration
- Parent Department: Ministry of Interior (Ghana)
- Website: https://home.gis.gov.gh/

The Ghana Immigration Service (GIS) is the government agency responsible for immigration and border management in Ghana. It operates under the Ministry of the Interior. Under the Immigration Service Act, 2016 (Act 908), the Service examines the travel documents of people entering or leaving Ghana, enforces laws concerning the immigration and employment of non-Ghanaians, manages and patrols the country's borders, and implements international cooperation agreements concerning migration. The Service may also issue entry visas and residence or work permits through the Comptroller-General or an authorised representative.

== History ==
The organisation originated as the Immigration and Passport Unit of the Gold Coast Colonial Police Force. The unit was led by British officer Nevile C. Hill and initially handled comparatively limited cross-border movement.

In May 1960, the government transferred the Immigration and Passport Unit from the police to the Ministry of the Interior, where it became a separate department. Responsibility for issuing Ghanaian passports was transferred to the Ministry of Foreign Affairs. The Aliens Act, 1963 (Act 160) subsequently provided a statutory basis for immigration operations.

The Ghana Immigration Service was formally established as a paramilitary institution under the Immigration Service Act, 1989 (PNDCL 226). The Immigration Act, 2000 (Act 573) later provided the principal framework for regulating the entry and departure of travellers and the residence and employment of foreign nationals.

In 2016, the Immigration Service Act, 2016 (Act 908) repealed the 1989 legislation and established the Service's current governance structure and statutory functions.

== Functions ==
The Immigration Service Act, 2016 defines the Service's objectives as the effective administration and management of migration and contributing to national security. Its statutory functions include:

- examining the travel documents of people entering or leaving Ghana;
- enforcing laws governing the immigration and employment of non-Ghanaians;
- advising on and implementing international cooperation agreements concerning migration;
- managing and patrolling Ghana's borders;
- issuing entry visas and residence or work permits through the Comptroller-General or an authorised representative; and
- performing other functions assigned by law.

== Governance and administration ==
The Service is governed by a 13-member Immigration Service Council appointed by the President under Article 70 of the Constitution. The Council advises the Minister for the Interior on immigration policy and oversees matters including administration, staff welfare, training, discipline, senior appointments and promotions, and international cooperation on migration.

The Comptroller-General is appointed by the President and serves as the head of the Service. Subject to the Council's policy direction, the Comptroller-General is responsible for its day-to-day administration. The office is supported by three Deputy Comptrollers-General responsible respectively for Finance and Administration; Command Post and Operations; and Legal, Research and Monitoring.

== Border management ==
A 2016 assessment by the International Organization for Migration examined selected border-crossing points in Ghana's Volta and Western regions and the training capacity of the Immigration Service. It identified problems including inadequate infrastructure, unreliable communications, shortages of serviceable transport, limited access to electricity and water, and gaps in training and management information.

From 2019 to 2025, the Service participated in the European Union-funded Strengthening Border Security in Ghana project, implemented by the International Centre for Migration Policy Development. The programme supported staff training, equipment, border-management information systems, cooperation with neighbouring countries and coordination between Ghanaian agencies. It also established joint mobile teams intended to improve responses to human trafficking, migrant smuggling and other cross-border threats.

== See also ==
- Ministry of Interior (Ghana)
- Refugee Board (Ghana)
- Immigration to Ghana
- Illegal immigration in Ghana
