= Kenneth Dzirasah =

Ghanaian politician

Hon. Kenneth Dzirasah

Member of the Ghana Parliament for South Tongu
- In office 7 January 1997 – 6 January 2009
- Preceded by: Oscar Ameyedowo
- Succeeded by: Kobla Mensah Woyome
- Majority: 23,730 (Dec 2004)

Chairman of Ghana Refugee Board
- Incumbent
- Assumed office January 2011
- President: John Atta Mills
- Preceded by: Emmanuel Owusu Bentil

Personal details
- Born: 13 January 1954 (age 72) Ghana
- Party: National Democratic Congress
- Education: University of Ghana
- Occupation: Politician
- Profession: Lawyer

Kenneth Dzirasah is a Ghanaian politician and lawyer. He was first deputy speaker from 1993 to 2001 and second deputy speaker from 2001 to 2005. He also served as a Member of Parliament (MP) for the South Tongu Constituency from 1997 to 2005 and MP for North Tongu from 2005 to 2008.

== Early life and education ==
Dzirasah was born on 13 January 1954. He attended the Ghana School of Law where he obtained his law degree prior to that he attended the University of Ghana, Legon.

== Career ==
He was a member of the 2nd, 3rd and 4th parliament of the 4th republic of Ghana in 2004 Ghanaian general election. He was the First Deputy Speaker of Parliament in 2000 and the Second Deputy Speaker of Parliament in 2004 all of which was under former President John Agyekum Kuffour administration. In January 2011, he was sworn in as the Chairman of the Ghana Refugee Board in 2011.

== Politics ==
Dzirasah was re-elected as member of the second parliament of the fourth republic of Ghana for South Tongu in 1996, 2000, 2004, all on the ticket of the National Democratic Congress. In 1996, he won the South Tongu seat with 22,254 votes out of the 26,942 valid votes cast, gaining 72.10% out of 100% over his opponents Kuma Abenyega who polled 4,235 votes, Francis Seko Ahoegba who polled 258 votes, Paul Kofi Hormeku who polled 195 votes. He again won the South Tongu seat in 2000 with 21,428 votes out of the 24,235 valid votes cast, gaining 88.40% out of 100% over his opponents Kuma Agbenyega who polled 1,514 votes, Daniel Kwaku Eworyi who polled 546 votes, Jacob A. A. Gharbin who polled 472 votes and Victor Best Gavi who polled 129 votes. He retained the seat again in 2004 with 27,140 out of the 31,046 valid votes cast, gaining 87.40% out of 100% over his opponents Micheal Zewu Glover who polled 3,410 votes, Apedo Samuel Kofi who polled 290 votes and Adjin Lewis Stephen who polled 206 votes. In the 2008 elections, Woyome Kobla Mensah instead of Dzirasah represented the National Democratic Congress and he won the South Tongu seat.

== Personal life ==
He is a Christian. He has a son named Edem.

== See also ==
- Refugee Board Ghana.
- List of MPs elected in the 2000 Ghanaian parliamentary elections.
- List of MPs elected in the 2004 Ghanaian parliamentary elections.
