= Muhammad Bawah Braimah =

Ghanaian politician

Hon. Alhaji Muhammad Bawah Braimah
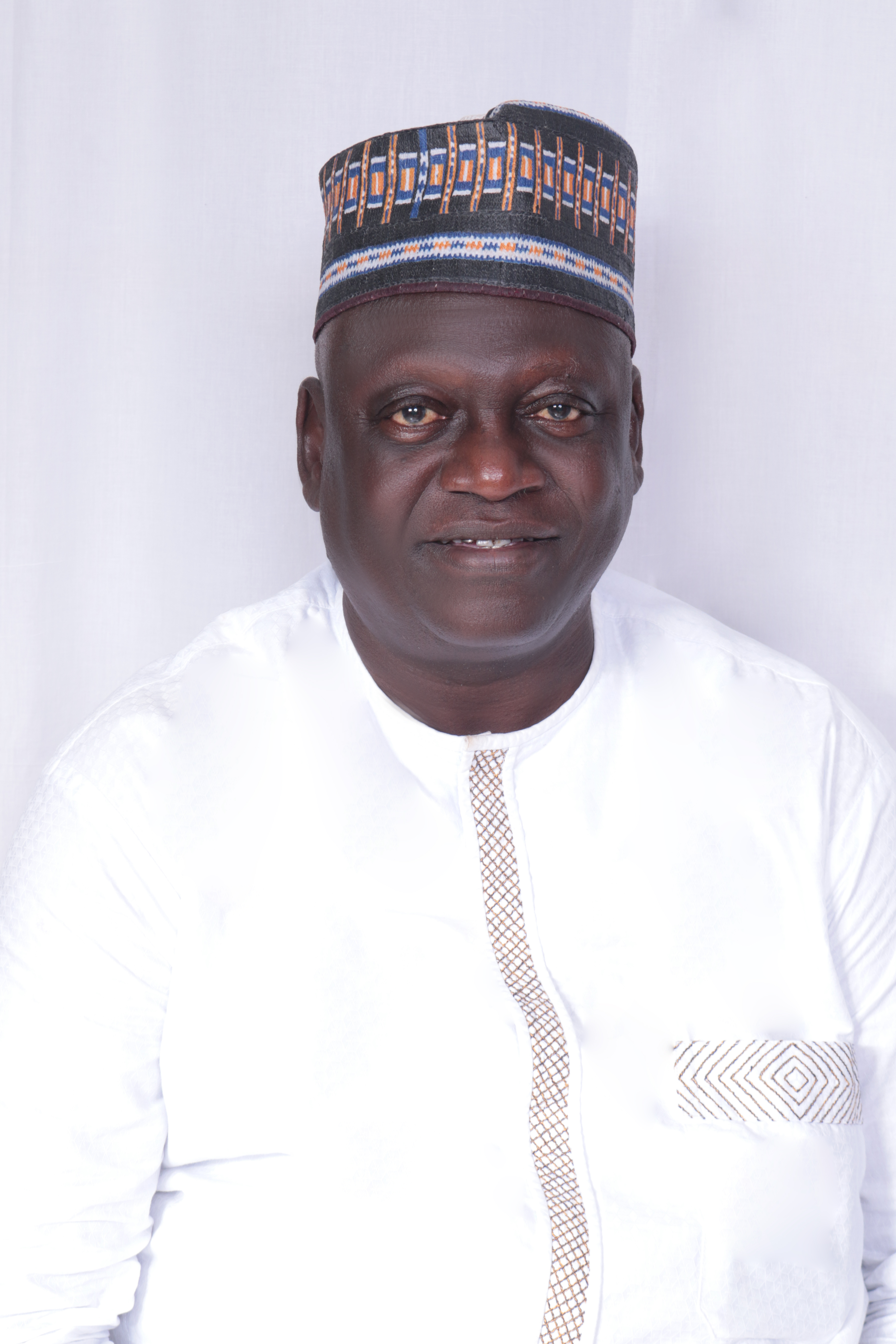

Member of Parliament for Ejura-Sekyedumase Constituency
- Incumbent
- Assumed office 7 January 2021

Personal details
- Born: Muhammad Bawah Braimah; 28 November 1959 (age 66) Kulungugu, Ghana
- Party: National Democratic Congress
- Occupation: Politician
- Profession: Municipal Chief Executive
- Committees: Public Accounts Committee; Defense and Interior Committee

Alhaji Muhammad Bawah Braimah is a Ghanaian politician and member of the Eighth Parliament of the Fourth Republic of Ghana representing the Ejura-Sekyedumase Constituency in the Ashanti Region on the ticket of the National Democratic Congress.

== Early life ==
Braimah was born on 28 November 1959 and hails from Kulungugu in the Upper East Region of Ghana. He attended Tamale Secondary School where he had his GCE 'O' Level June, 1979. He also attended GIMPA where he had BSc In Public Administration June, 2025. He had his MBA in Management at Almond Institute.

== Career ==
Braimah was the Municipal Coordinator for NADMO from 2009 to 2013 and later became the Municipal Chief Executive for Ejura-Sekyedumase Municipal Assembly from 2013 to 2016. He is also the Managing Director for Mubabra Company Limited in Ejura.

== Politics ==
Braimah is a member of the National Democratic Congress and the member of parliament for Ejura-Sekyedumase Constituency in the Ashanti Region of Ghana. In the 2016 Ghanaian general elections, Braimah won the parliamentary seat with 23,277 votes whilst the NPP parliamentary aspirant Mohammed Salisu Bamba had 21,795 votes. CPP's aspirant Abdalla Mahawan Sani also had 132 votes whiles PNC's aspirant Laari Samuel had 83 votes. In the 2020 Ghanaian general elections, he again won the parliamentary seat with 30,056 votes whilst the NPP parliamentary aspirant Mohammed Salisu Bamba had 25,009 votes. CPP's aspirant Adams Hussein also had 119 votes whiles PNC's aspirant Laari Samuel had 53 votes.

=== Committees ===
Braimah is a member of the Public Accounts Committee and also a member of the Defense and Interior Committee.

== Personal life ==
Braimah is a Muslim.

== Honor ==
Braimah was honored by the Concerned Youth of Ejura for his efforts in the improvement of education in the community.
