= Explosives truck =

Type of truck used to move explosives

An explosives truck is a type of specially designed trucks, in order to move explosives.

Containers containing explosives are loaded and unloaded according to prescribed safety methods, are parked in specially designated areas, and have specific regulations about e.g. record keeping of the moved materials.

== Qualifications of explosive truck drivers ==
Typical requirements for the job include:
- Physical ability to load and unload explosives safely
- Experience driving large vehicles
- Commercial driver's license (CDL)
- Knowledge of federal, state, and local regulations related to transporting explosives
- Ability to pass a background check and obtain necessary clearances

== Specialty trucks ==
Explosives trucks that are specifically designed or modified for transporting explosives. They typically include specialized explosive storage boxes commonly referred to as “day boxes,” for the safe, temporary storage and transport of small quantities of explosives.

== Regulations ==
Federal explosive truck regulations are issued by the Office of Hazardous Materials Safety, part of the Pipeline and Hazardous Materials Safety Administration, an agency of the United States Department of Transportation.

These regulations typically require the truck driver to park at specific locations, and also to assure safe transport of the explosives'.

These rules involve what are called "safe havens", areas designated by the federal, state or local government for the parking of unattended vehicles transporting explosives. There are approved standards for the construction and maintenance of safe havens used for unattended storage of explosives.

== Notable explosives truck accidents ==
- 17 September 1943, Naval Station Norfolk, Virginia, killing 24, and injuring 250 people.
- 7 August 1956, Cali, Colombia, caused 1,300 deaths and 4000 injuries.
- 7 september 2007, Mexico City, which killed 37.
- 1 November 2011, Fuquan, Guizhou province, China, which killed eight people.
- 6 September 2014, near Charleville, Queensland, Australia, which injured eight people.
- 20 January 2022, Appiate, Ghana, killing 13 and injuring 59.
