= Kobla Mensah Wisdom Woyome =

Ghanaian politician (born 1971)

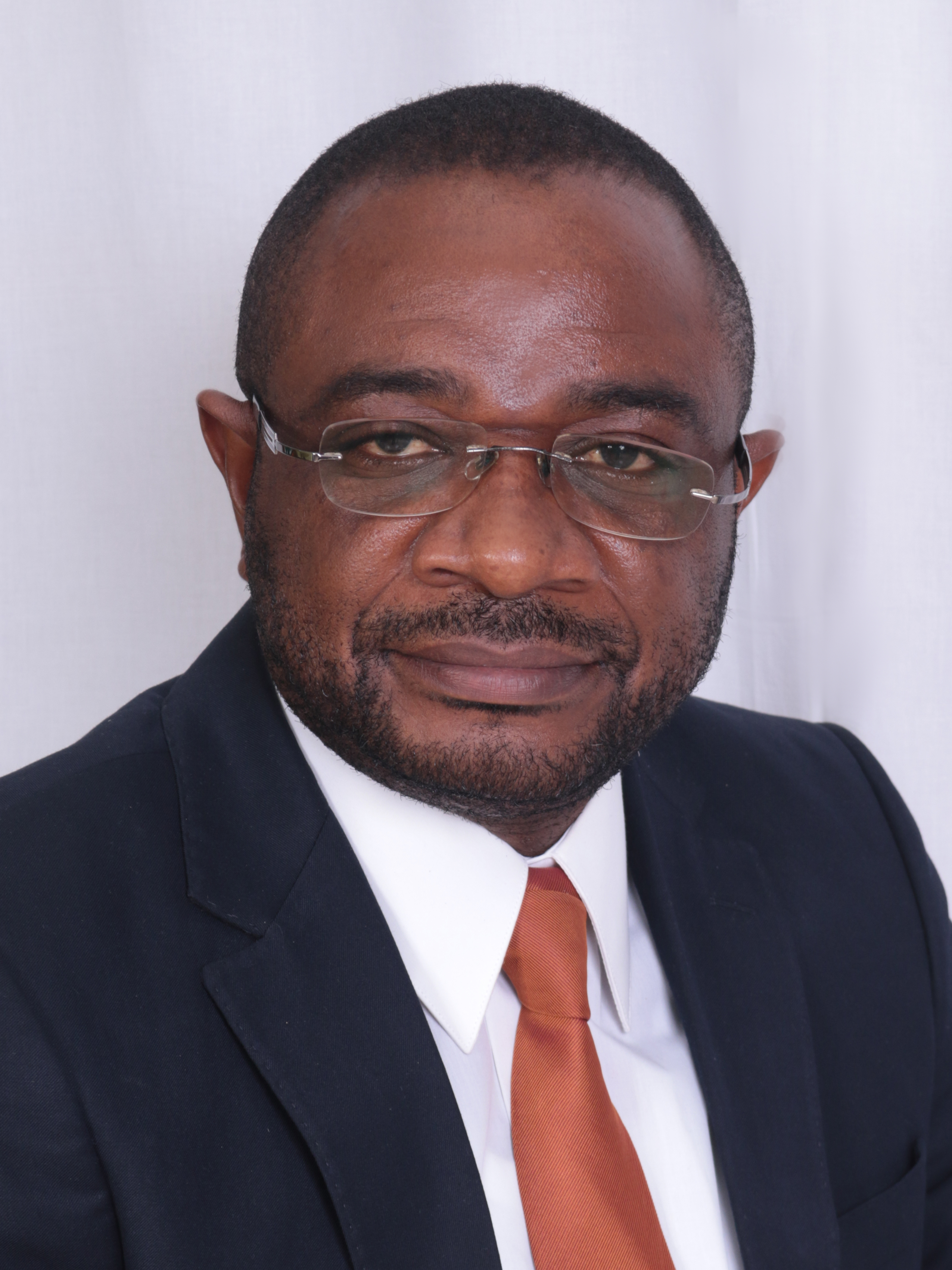

Member of Ghana Parliament for South Tongu
- In office 7 January 2009 – 7 January 2025
- Preceded by: Kenneth Dzirasah

Personal details
- Born: 1 September 1971 (age 55) Dabala, Volta Region Ghana
- Party: National Democratic Congress
- Children: 3
- Education: Presbyterian Boys' Secondary School; University of Ghana
- Occupation: Politician
- Profession: Business Person

Kobla Mensah Wisdom Woyome (born 21 September 1971) is a Ghanaian politician and was a member of the Seventh Parliament of the Fourth Republic of Ghana representing the South Tongu in the Volta Region on the ticket of the National Democratic Congress. He lost his bid to represent his the South Tongu constituency and the NDC at the 2024 general elections after losing theNDC presidential and parliamentary primaries on Saturday, May 13, 2023, to Maxwell Kwame Lukutor.

== Early life and education ==
Woyome was born on 21 September 1971. He hails from Dabala a town in the South Tongu District of the Volta Region of Ghana. Woyome is a graduate of the Presbyterian Boys' Secondary School and Sixth Form Science College, Legon. Woyome completed his Bachelor of Science degree in Computer Science and Statistics at the University of Ghana, Legon, in 1997. He also had his postgraduate diploma in business administration at the Ghana Institute of Management and Public Administration (GIMPA).

== Career ==
Woyome was the chief executive officer of the Stewise group of companies from 2009 until he became the MP for South Tongu.

== Political life ==
He was a minority member of the 6th parliament of the 4th republic of Ghana. He was appointed to the Youth, Sports and Culture Committee as a ranking member. He was also a member of the Foreign Affairs Committee and Standing Order committee.

=== 2016 election ===
Woyome contested the South Tongu constituency parliamentary seat in the Volta Region on the ticket of the National Democratic Congress during the 2016 Ghanaian general election and won with 31,978 votes, representing 87.09% of the total votes cast. He was elected over Seth Kwasi Agbi of the New Patriotic Party, who polled 3,595 votes which is equivalent to 9.79%, while parliamentary candidate for the Convention People's Party Avuwoada Robert Mensah had 704 votes, representing 1.92% and the parliamentary candidate for the PPP Vorsah Wisdom Justice Kofi had 441 votes, representing 1.20% of the total votes.

=== 2020 election ===
Woyome was re-elected as a member of parliament for South Tongu (Ghana parliament constituency) on the ticket of the National Democratic Congress during the 2020 Ghanaian general election with 48,795 votes, representing 82.91% of the total votes. He won the election over Joseph Wisdom Ahadjie of the New Patriotic Party who polled 10,058 votes which is equivalent to 17.09% and parliamentary candidate for the GUM Williams MacDonald Hoggar had 352 votes representing 0.58% of the total votes cast.

== Personal life ==
Woyome identifies as a Christian and is a member of Action Chapel International. He is married with three children.
