= Peter Boakye-Ansah =

Ghanaian politician (1949–2018)

Member of parliament for Ejura-Sekyedumase Constituency
- In office 7 January 1993 – 6 January 2001
- President: Jerry John Rawlings
- Preceded by: New
- Succeeded by: Sampson Atakora

Personal details
- Born: 29 July 1949 Ashanti Region, Gold Coast (now Ghana)
- Died: 19 July 2008 (aged 58)
- Party: National Democratic Congress
- Education: Osei Tutu Training College, Kumasi
- Occupation: Politician
- Profession: Teacher

Peter Boakye-Ansah (29 July 1949 – 19 July 2018) was a Ghanaian politician and a member of the 1st and 2nd parliaments of the 4th Republic of Ghana. He was a member of parliament for the Ejura Sekyedumasi constituency from 7 January 1993 to 6 January 2001.

== Early life and education ==
Boakye-Ansah was born in September 1949. He studied at Osei Tutu Training College where he obtained his Teachers' Training Certificate, and Bonsu Agricultural Training School where he trained as an Agricultural Field Assistant.

== Career and politics ==
Prior to entering politics Boakye-Ansah was a trained teacher. He was the district secretary for the Ejura Sekyedumase district prior to entering parliament. He assumed office as a member of the 1st parliament of the 4th republic of Ghana on the ticket of the National Democratic Congress on 7 January 1993 after he emerged winner at the 1992 Ghanaian parliamentary election held on 29 December 1992. During the 1996 Ghanaian General Elections, Boakye-Ansah stood for the Ejura Sekyedumase seat once again, and he polled 16,992 votes which represented 62% of the total votes cast. He served as a member of parliament for the Ejura-Sekyedumase constituency from 7 January 1993 until 6 January 2001. He was succeeded by Sampson Atakora, also of the NDC.

== Personal life and death ==
Boakye-Ansah was a Christian. He died on 19 July 2018 after a short illness.
