= Peter Ekpe Mawuli =

Ghanaian media personality

- Born: Peter Ekpe Mawuli; Bogoso, Western Region, Ghana
- Other name: Abro
- Citizenship: Ghanaian
- Occupations: Media personality, film producer, entertainment pundit, political communicator
- Known for: Entertainment commentary, media panel discussions
- Political party: New Patriotic Party

Peter Ekpe Mawuli, known as Abro, is a Ghanaian media personality, film producer, entertainment pundit, and political communicator. He is known for commentary on Ghanaian entertainment and political issues across media platforms.

He has also been associated with Ghana’s film industry and political communication activities within the New Patriotic Party.

== Media and entertainment ==
Mawuli has participated in Ghanaian media commentary focused on entertainment and public affairs. He has been described in media reports as a commentator on music industry issues and artist performance standards. He has publicly expressed views supporting Shatta Wale as a leading figure in Ghanaian music.

== Film industry involvement ==
He has been linked to commentary on Ghana’s film industry and policy discussions related to creative arts development. In public statements, he has engaged in discussions involving funding and development of film infrastructure projects.

== Political involvement ==
Mawuli has been associated with political commentary within Ghana’s New Patriotic Party environment. He has appeared in media discussions addressing political leadership and party-related developments.

== Public commentary ==
He is known for commentary on Ghana’s entertainment industry, including public criticism of judicial and institutional decisions affecting public figures. His statements on musicians and entertainment policy have generated public discussion in Ghanaian media.

== Reception ==
His commentary has been reported in entertainment and political news coverage, often generating public debate on social media and radio discussions.
