= South Tongu (Ghana parliament constituency) =

Ghana parliament constituency

- constituency for the Parliament of Ghana
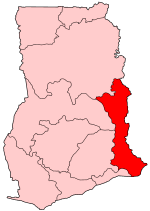
- District: South Tongu District
- Region: Volta Region of Ghana

Current constituency
- Created: 2004
- Party: National Democratic Congress
- MP: Maxwell Kwame Lukutor

South Tongu is one of the constituencies represented in the Parliament of Ghana. It elects one Member of Parliament (MP) by the first past the post system of election. South Tongu is located in the South Tongu district of the Volta Region of Ghana.

== Boundaries ==
The seat is located within the South Tongu District of the Volta Region of Ghana.

== Members of Parliament ==
First elected	Member	Party
1992	Oscar Ameyedowo	National Democratic Congress
1996	Kenneth Dzirasah	National Democratic Congress
2008	Kobena Mensah Woyome	National Democratic Congress
2024	Maxwell Kwame Lukutor	National Democratic Congress

== Elections ==
2024 Ghanaian general election: South Tongu
Party	Candidate	Votes	%	±%
NDC	Maxwell Kwame Lukutor	42,881	91.89	
NPP	Lady Elizabeth Segbenu Agah	2,620	5.61	
PAG	Olivia Sosu Quarshie	1,165	2.50	
Majority		40,261	86.28	
Turnout		46,927		—
Registered electors				

2020 Ghanaian general election: South Tongu
Party	Candidate	Votes	%	±%
NDC	Woyome Kobla Mensah	48,795	82.42	
NPP	Ahadjie Joseph Wisdom	10,058	16.99	
Ghana Union Movement	Hoggar Williams Macdonald	352	0.59	
Majority		38,737	65.43	
Turnout				—
Registered electors				

2016 Ghanaian general election: South Tongu
Party	Candidate	Votes	%	±%
NDC	Woyome Kobla Mensah	31,978	87.09	
NPP	Seth Kwasi Agbi	3,595	9.79	
CPP	Avuwoada Robert Mensah	704	1.92	
PPP	Vorsah Wisdom Justice Kofi	441	1.20	
Majority		28,383	77.3	
Turnout		37,074	63.63	—
Registered electors		58,269		

2012 Ghanaian general election: South Tongu
Party	Candidate	Votes	%	±%
NDC	Woyome Kobla Mensah	32,785	83.03	
Independent	Klutse Kudomor	4,417	11.19	
NPP	Leonard Kwaku Baanjo - Klogo	1,945	4.13	
PPP	Ahiabu Holy Kofi	248	0.63	
CPP	Richard Kofi Bedzra	69	0.17	
NDP	Prosper Senyo Glover	22	0.06	
Majority		28,368	71.84	
Turnout		40,343	77.3	—
Registered electors		52,183		

2008 Ghanaian parliamentary election: South Tongu
Party	Candidate	Votes	%	±%
National Democratic Congress	Woyome Kobla Mensah	28,083	72.4	−15.3
Independent	Mensah Dawukpor	7,701	19.9	—
New Patriotic Party	Aglah Cate Aku	2,659	6.9	−4.1
Democratic Freedom Party	Samuel Kofi Apedo	169	0.4	—
Convention People's Party	Dr. Prosper Kofi Ashilevi	162	0.4	−0.5
Majority		20,382	52.5	−24.2
Turnout		33,073	73.6	—
Registered electors		44,946		

2004 Ghanaian parliamentary election:South Tongu
Party	Candidate	Votes	%	±%
National Democratic Congress	Kenneth Dzirasah	27,140	87.7	−0.7
New Patriotic Party	Michael Zewu Glover	3,410	11.0	+8.8
Convention People's Party	Samuel Kofi Apedo	290	0.9	−1.0
Every Ghanaian Living Everywhere	Lewis Stephen Adjin	106	0.3	
Majority		23,730	76.7	−5.5
Turnout		31,335	90.3	—
Registered electors		34,700		

2000 Ghanaian parliamentary election:South Tongu Source:Adam Carr's Election Archives
Party	Candidate	Votes	%	±%
National Democratic Congress	Kenneth Dzirasah	21,428	88.4	+6.2
Independent	Kuma Agbenyega	1,514	6.2	−9.5
New Patriotic Party	Daniel Kwaku Eworyi	546	2.2	
Convention People's Party	Jacob A A Gharbin	472	1.9	—
People's National Convention	Victor Best Gavi	129	0.5	−0.2
National Reform Party	Ahorgba Francis Seko	82	0.3	
United Ghana Movement	Zewu Stephen Quarshie	64	0.3	
Majority		19,914	82.2	+15.3
Turnout		24,513	70.3	
Registered electors		34,871		

1996 Ghanaian parliamentary election:South Tongu Source:Electoral Commission of Ghana
Party	Candidate	Votes	%	±%
National Democratic Congress	Kenneth Dzirasah	22,254	82.6	
Independent	Kuma Abenyega	4,235	15.7	—
People's Convention Party	Francis Seko Ahorgba	258	1.0	—
People's National Convention	Paul Kofi Hormeku	195	0.7	—
Majority		18,019	66.9	—
Turnout		26,942	87.2	—

1992 Ghanaian parliamentary election:South Tongu Source:
Party	Candidate	Votes	%	±%
National Democratic Congress	Kenneth Dzirasah			

== See also ==
- List of Ghana Parliament constituencies
