= Daniella Mawusi Ntow Sarpong =

Ghanaian fire service officer

- Born: April 6, 1967 (age 59)
- Citizenship: Ghana
- Education: Ghana Institute of Management and Public Administration, Kwame Nkrumah University of Science and Technology, and University of Cape Coast
- Occupation: Fire officer
- Organization: Ghana National Fire and Rescue Service

Daniella Mawusi Ntow Sarpong is a Ghanaian female fire officer. On November 1, 1992, she was enlisted into the Ghana National Fire Service as a Cadet Officer. She was born on April 6, 1967. She is a Ghanaian fire service officer and public safety administrator who serves as the Chief Fire Officer of the Ghana National Fire and Rescue Service. She is the first woman to lead the service since its establishment.

== Education ==
Daniella Ntow-Sarpong is a Ghanaian professional in human resource development and public administration. She holds a Master of Arts in Human Resource Development (MA-HRD) and has received academic training from notable Ghanaian institutions, including the Ghana Institute of Management and Public Administration, Kwame Nkrumah University of Science and Technology, and the University of Cape Coast.

Ntow-Sarpong is recognized for her work in organizational development, capacity building, and public service administration. Through her academic background and professional experience, she has contributed to strengthening institutional performance and promoting effective management practices within the public sector.

== Appointment as Chief Fire Officer ==
Ntow Sarpong was officially sworn in as Chief Fire Officer at the Jubilee House in Accra, where she formally assumed responsibility for overseeing fire safety, emergency response operations, and national fire prevention strategies. She was first appointed to the position in March 2025. As Chief Fire Officer, she leads the development and implementation of national strategies on fire prevention, public safety education, and emergency management.

The officials were sworn in by John Dramani Mahama, who urged them to discharge their duties with integrity, discipline, and a strong commitment to national service. After the official sworn in as the Chief Fire Officer of the Ghana National Fire Service (GNFS), she became the first woman to lead the institution.

== Career ==
Before her appointment as Chief Fire Officer, Ntow Sarpong served as Deputy Chief Fire Officer and Director of Fire Safety within the Ghana National Fire Service.

With over three decades of experience in the fire service, she has contributed to strengthening fire safety education, operational preparedness, and national emergency response systems. Her leadership is expected to enhance operational readiness and public awareness on fire safety as Ghana continues efforts to reduce fire incidents and protect lives and property.
