= Immigration to Ghana =

Immigration to Ghana is managed by the Ghana Immigration Service (GIS). Ghana is a country located at the western part of the African continent with a population of 28.83 million and gained independence on 6 March 1957.

The Ghanaian government has most recently reviewed its immigration policy, as its intention is to increase immigration of skilled labour.

== Support and control of immigration ==
=== Features of skilled immigration ===
A skilled worker is any worker who has special skill, training, knowledge, and (usually acquired) ability in their work. A skilled worker may have attended a college, university or technical school. Or, a skilled worker may have learned their skills on the job. Examples of skilled labor include engineers, software development, paramedics, police officers, soldiers, physicians, crane operators, truck drivers, machinist, drafters, plumbers, craftsmen, cooks and accountants. These workers can be either blue-collar or white-collar workers, with varied levels of training or education. Ghana has a skilled worker immigration policy aimed at creating a highly skilled and knowledgeable Ghanaian population, capable of creating wealth for Ghana and rapidly increasing the Ghanaian economy GDP output; and has recruited highly skilled professional experts in the fields of information and communications technology, manufacturing, health care, construction, finance and banking, retailing and the oil and gas industry sectors of the Ghanaian economy.

Skilled worker immigrants in Ghana include Indian, South Korean, Japanese, Malaysian, Cuban, Lebanese, Chinese, German and Dutch nationals and however after seven years as Ghanaian permanent residents with the Ghana Card permanent residency; skilled workers have gone on to become Ghanaian nationals. Since 2012, Ghana has also had its highly professional skilled worker expatriates returning from the diaspora back to Ghana.

=== Return to roots: African Americans in Ghana ===
Lydia Frances Polgreen (born 1975) is a journalist, who is the editor-in-chief of HuffPost. She was previously the editorial director of NYT Global at The New York Times, and the West Africa bureau chief for the same publication, based in Dakar, Senegal, from 2005–2009. She won many awards, most recently the Livingston award in 2009. She also reported from India. She was then based in Johannesburg, South Africa where she was The New York Times Johannesburg Bureau Chief. As reported by the journalist Lydia Polgreen in a New York Times article, the fact that Ghanaian slave exports to the Americas were so important between the 16th and 19th centuries means that Ghana currently is trying to attract African slave descendants from the Americas in order that they settle there, and so that they return to make the country the new home to many descendants of the Ghanaian diaspora – though not all are of Ghanaian descent. Accordingly, as reported by Valerie Papaya Mann, president of the African American Association of Ghana, thousands of African Americans are already now living in Ghana, at least for part of the year. To encourage migration or visits by the descendants of enslaved Africans from the Americas, Ghana decided in 2005 to offer them a special visa and grant them Ghanaian passports.

The history of African Americans in Ghana goes back to individuals such as American civil rights activist and writer W. E. B. Du Bois, who settled in Ghana in the last years of his life and is buried in the capital Accra. Since then, other African Americans who are descended from slaves imported from areas within the present-day jurisdiction of Ghana and neighboring states have applied for permanent resident status in Ghana. As of 2015, the number of African-American residents has been estimated at around 3,000 people, a large portion of whom live in Accra.

== Country of birth of residents in Ghana ==
According to the Ghana Statistics Service 375,000 of the Ghana resident population were born outside Ghana, representing 2.5% of the total Ghana resident population. In 2010 Census, European-born population was 14,295 in which some of them could be children of Ghanaians living in Europe.

Country	2012
Togo	142,688
Nigeria	57,056
Ivory Coast	46,058
Liberia	20,056
Benin	19,502
Niger	9,205
Mali	7,819
United Kingdom	2,117
Sierra Leone	1,939
Lebanon	1,142
India	989
United States	952
Canada	320
Netherlands	284
Italy	268
China	264
France	254
Switzerland	227
Guinea	161
Cameroon	113

== See also ==
- Illegal immigration in Ghana
