= Issifu Pangabu Mohammed =

Ghanaian politician

Hon. Issifu Pangabu Mohammed

Member of Parliament
- In office 7 January 2005 – 6 January 2009
- President: John Kufuor
- Preceded by: Sampson Atakora
- Constituency: Ejura-Sekyedumase

Member of Parliament
- In office 7 January 2009 – 6 January 2013
- President: John Atta Mills
- Succeeded by: Mohammed Salisu Bamba
- Constituency: Ejura-Sekyedumase
- Majority: NDC

Personal details
- Born: 6 March 1962 (age 64)
- Party: National Democratic Congress
- Children: 6
- Occupation: Farmer/Agriculturist

Issifu Pangabu Mohammed (born 6 March 1962) is an agriculturist and a politician from Ghana. He was a member of parliament on the ticket of the National Democratic Congress party, representing the Ejura-Sekyedumase constituency in the Ashanti Region of Ghana in the 4th and 5th parliaments of the 4th republic of Ghana.

== Early life and education ==
Mohammed was born on 6 March 1962. He hails from Bawku, a town in the Upper East Region of Ghana. He obtained his GCE O Level secondary education qualification in 1979.

== Career ==
Mohammed is the owner and managing director of Pee Farms in Ejura.

== Political career ==
Mohammed is a member of the National Democratic Congress. He became a member of parliament from January 2005 after emerging winner in the General Election in December 2004. He run for a second time and won.7,8 He was the MP for Ejura-Sekyedumase constituency. He was elected as the member of parliament for this constituency in the fourth and fifth parliament of the fourth Republic of Ghana.

== Elections ==
Mohammed was elected as the member of parliament for the Ejura-Sekyedumase constituency of the Ashanti Region of Ghana for the first time in the 2004 Ghanaian general elections. He won on the ticket of the National Democratic Congress. His constituency was a part of the 3 parliamentary seats out of 39 seats won by the National Democratic Congress in that election for the Ashanti Region. The National Democratic Congress won a minority total of 94 parliamentary seats out of 230 seats. He was elected with 17,058 votes out of 33,448 total valid votes cast. This was equivalent to 51% of total valid votes cast. He was elected over Raymond Abuska of the Peoples’ National Convention, Richard Ofori Dwamena of the New Patriotic Party, Mathias N. G. Naala of the Convention People's Party and Dominic Kwabena Anomah B. an independent candidate. These obtained 324, 13,608,240 and 2,218 votes respectively of the total valid votes cast. These were equivalent to 1%, 40.7%, 0.7% and 6.6% respectively of total valid votes cast.

In 2008, he won the general elections on the ticket of the National Democratic Congress for the same constituency. His constituency was part of the 3 parliamentary seats out of 39 seats won by the National Democratic Congress in that election for the Ashanti Region. The National Democratic Congress won a majority total of 113 parliamentary seats out of 230 seats. He was elected with 20,038 votes out of 38,618 total valid votes cast equivalent to 51.89% of total valid votes cast. He was elected over Dr. Josuah Ayarkwa of the New Patriotic Party, Patrick K. Konadu of the People's National Convention, K.K. Nti Oliver of the Democratic Freedom Party, Joseph Snwok Lambon of the Convention People's Party and Yusif Mohammed Kpajal an independent candidate. These obtained 17,312, 218, 136, 376 and 538 votes respectively of the total valid votes cast. This was equivalent to 44.83%, 0.56%, 0.35%, 0.97% and 1.39% respectively of the total votes cast.

== Personal life ==
Mohammed is a Muslim. He is married with six children.

== See also ==
- List of MPs elected in the 2004 Ghanaian parliamentary election
- List of MPs elected in the 2008 Ghanaian parliamentary election

Parliament of Ghana
Preceded by Sampson Atakora	Member of Parliament for Ejura-Sekyedumase; 2009 – 2013
Political offices
Preceded by Issifu Pangabu Mohammed	Succeeded by Mohammed Salisu Bamba
