= Ministry of Interior (Ghana) =

Government ministry of Ghana

Ministry of the Interior

Agency overview
- Jurisdiction: Government of Ghana
- Headquarters: P.O Box M42, Accra
- Minister responsible: Hon. Mubarak Mohammed Muntaka
- Website: mint.gov.gh

The Ministry of the Interior is a ministry of the government of Ghana.

== About the Ministry ==
The Ministry is headed by the Minister of Interior, who is appointed by the President of Ghana and is approved by the Ghana Parliament after a vetting process. The current Minister of Interior is Hon.Mubarak Mohammed Muntaka. He is a Renowned Politician who is the Member of Parliament for Asawase constituency in Ashanti region. Hon. Muntaka was instated on 30 January 2025.

The mandate of the Ministry of the Interior and its Agencies is guided by the 1992 Constitution of Ghana. It is further guided by the Civil Service Act 1993 (PNDCL327) and other relevant enactment.

== Objectives of the Ministry ==
In order to ensure the proper functioning of the Ministry, it has it functions being divided into seven major objectives. These are aimed at achieving the wholist purpose of the Ministries aim of maintaining internal peace:

1. Ensure adequate protection of life and property.
2. Ensure effective and efficient crime prevention and detection.
3. Strengthen disaster prevention, management and social mobilisation.
4. Regulate and monitor the entry, stay and exit of nationals of all countries.
5. Develop a highly efficient and humane custodial and reformatory system.
6. Improve institutional capacity.
7. Improve the public relations system

== Related agencies ==
The Ministry of Interior being the government's chief agency in charge of maintenance and enforcement of Internal Law and Order has agencies under it that have specific functions aimed at achieving the overall purpose of the Ministry and the country as a whole. The Institutions through which the Ministry performs its functions are: To achieve its mandate and objectives, the Ministry operates through ten (10) Agencies:

- Ghana Police Service
- Ghana Prisons Service
- Ghana National Fire Service
- Ghana Immigration Service
- Narcotics Control Commission
- National Disaster Management Organization
- Gaming Commission of Ghana
- National Commission on Small Arms and Light Weapons
- National Peace Council
- Ghana Refugee Board
- Interior Headquarters

== Functions of the Ministry ==
Under section 13 of the Civil Service Act, 1993 (PNDCL 327), the Ministry of the Interior is responsible for formulating and implementing internal security policies, contributing to national development planning, and overseeing performance of agencies and institution within its sector.

Its principal functions include:

- Developing and reviewing policies on internal security in line with national priorities and public needs.
- Supervising, monitoring and evaluating the activities and performance of agencies under the Ministry's jurisdiction.
- Formulating and updating regulations, standards and operational guidelines to improve sector governance and effectiveness.
- Encouraging the adoption of modern management practices, digital technologies, electronic service delivery to strengthen institutional performance.
- Supporting research, staff training and capacity-building initiatives to enhance service delivery.
- Designing strategies to mobilize financial and other resources for the effective operation of the sector.
- Strengthening cooperation with domestic and international partners, including ministries, departments, agencies, and metropolitan, municipal and district assemblies (MMDAs).
- Coordinating assessment and implementing relevant international agreements, treaties, conventions, and protocols affecting the sector.
- Providing policy direction and regulatory oversight for institutions operating within the Ministry's mandate.
- Promoting Ghana's reputation as a peaceful, secure and attractive destination for investment.

== Acts passed under the Ministry ==
Security and Intelligence Agencies Acts, 2026 (1168), establishes the framework governing the National Security Council, Regional Security Councils (REGSECs) and District Security Councils (DISECs) with the aim of enhancing coordination among security agencies, promoting accountability and supporting intelligence-led decision-making

The Anti-Terrorism Act, 2008 (Act 762), establishes the framework for preventing, detecting, and suppressing acts of terrorism, regulating the use of Ghana's territory, resources and financial services for terrorist activities, and providing related counter-terrorism measures

The Anti-Terrorism (Amendment) Act, 2012 (Act 842) amended the Anti-Terrorism Act, 2008 (Act 762) to authorize the Attorney-General and Minister of Justice to issue directives for implementing United Nations Security Council sanctions relating to terrorism. The Act gave effect to obligation under UN Security Council Resolutions 1267 (1999), 1373 (2001), 1718 (2006) and their successor resolutions, particularly regarding the freezing and seizure of terrorist assets, while making related amendments

The Human Trafficking Act, 2005 (Act 694), establishes the legal framework for the prevention, reduction, and punishment of human trafficking, as well as the rehabilitation and reintegration of trafficked persons

The Economic and Organised Crime Act, 2010, established the Economic and Organised Crime Office (EOCO) as a specialised agency responsible for preventing, monitoring and investigating economic and organised crimes. The Act also provides EOCO with the mandate to assist in the prosecution of such offences under the authority of the Attorney-General, recover proceeds derived from criminal activities and address other related matters

The National Peace Council Act, 2011 (Act 818), established the National Peace Council as an independent statutory body to promote sustainable peace in Ghana. The Act defines the Council's mandate, functions, composition, and administrative framework, including its role in conflict prevention, management, resolution, and the promotion of national unity and peace

The Criminal Procedure Code, 1960 (Act 30), is the principal legislation governing criminal procedure in Ghana, setting out the rules and processes for the investigation, prosecution, trial, and disposition of criminal cases

The Public Holidays Act, 2001 (Act 601) is a law that governs the declaration and observance of statutory public holidays in Ghana, including the President's authority to declare additional or substitute public holidays, and provides for related matters

The Anti-Money Laundering Act, 2008 (Act 749) is an Act of Parliament that prohibits money laundering, establishes the Financial Intelligence Centre to receive, analyse, and disseminate financial intelligence, and provides the legal framework for the prevention, detection, investigation, and prosecution of money laundering and related offences

The Anti-Money Laundering (Amendment) Act, 2014 (Act 874) amended Ghana's Anti-Money Laundering Act, 2008 (Act 749). It broaden the scope of the offence of money laundering by expanding the definition of prohibited conduct involving property derived from unlawful activity. the Act also amended several provisions of Act 749 to strengthen the legal framework for preventing, detecting, and prosecuting money laundering and related offences

The Electronic Transactions Act, 2008 (Act 772) is an Act of Parliament that regulates electronic communications and electronic transactions in Ghana. It establishes the legal framework for the recognition and use of electronic records, electronic signatures, electronic contracts, and certification service providers, and provides for matters connected with electronic commerce and cyber crime

The Criminal Offences (Amendment) Act, 2012 (Act 849) amended the Criminal Offences Act, 1960 (Act 29) to criminalize offences such as unlawful use of human body parts, enforced disappearance, sexual exploitation, illicit trafficking in explosive, firearms and ammunition, participation in organized criminal groups, and racketeering, while making related amendments to the criminal law

== Heads of the Ministry (Fourth Republic) ==
Name	Duration	Profession	Political Party	Deputy
Mubarak Mohammed Muntaka	2025 - Present	Politician and Agricultural Economist	NDC	Ebenezer Okletey Terlabi
Henry Quartey	2024 - 2025	Entrepreneur and politician	NPP	Naana Eyiah Quansah
Ambrose Dery	2017 - 2024	Lawyer and Politician	NPP	Henry Quartey 2017 -2020 Naana Eyiah Quansah 2021 -2024
Prosper Douglass K. Bani	2016 - 2017	Senior manager and specialist in international peace-building and development processes	NDC	James Agalga
Mark Owen Woyongo	2014 - 2016	Journalist and public relation/communication expert	NDC	James Agalga
Kwesi Ahwoi	2013 - 2014	Economist, administrator and diplomat	NDC	James Agalga
William Kwasi Aboah	2012 - 2013	Lawyer and senior law enforcement officer	NDC	Kobby Acheampong
Benjamin Kunbuor	2011 - 2012	Lawyer, law lecturer and politician	NDC	Kobby Acheampong
Martin Alamisi Burns Kaiser Amidu	2010 - 2011	Lawyer and legal practitioner	NDC	Kwasi Akyem Apea-Kubi
Cletus Apul Avoka	2009 - 2010	Lawyer and politician	NDC	Kwasi Apea-Kubi
Kwame Addo-Kuffour	2008 - 2009	Physician and politician	NPP	Kwaku Agyeman-Manu
Peter Kwamena Essilfie Bartels	2007 - 2008	Lawyer and politician	NPP	Kwaku Agyeman-Manu
Albert Kan-Dapaah	2006 - 2007	Chartered accountant and politician	NPP	Kwaku Agyeman-Manu
Papa Owusu-Ankomah	2005 - 2006	Lawyer and politician	NPP	Nkrabeah Effah Darteh
Hackman Owusu Agyeman	2003 - 2005	Agricultural economist and politician	NPP	Nkrabeah Effah Darteh
Kwame Addo-Kuffour	2002 - 2003	Physician and politician	NPP	Thomas Broni
Malik Al-Hassan Yakubu	2001 - 2002	Lawyer, educator and politician	NPP	Thomas Broni
Nii Okaidja Adamafio	1997 - 2001	Lawyer and politician	NDC	Albert Bhair
Alhaji Mahama Iddrisu	1996 - 1997	Businessman and politician	NDC	
Emmanuel M. Osei-Owusu	1993 - 1996	Military officer and politician	NDC	Albert Bhair

== Projects and Initiatives undertaken by the Ministry ==
- Under the Mahama-led administration, the Ghana Immigration Service launched a project "Secure Our Borders (SECOBOR)", an initiative aimed at strengthening security at borders
- The Ministry constructed seven new Regional Immigration Offices nationwide and also a Ghana Immigration Service Headquarters at Ho
- The Ministry launched the BORDER Project an initiative designed to foster peace, enhance security and strengthen resilience in Ghana's border communities. This was done in collaboration with World Vision Ghana, PATRIP Foundation and RACED Ghana
- As part of the Ministry's peace initiatives, the Ministry collaborated with United Nations Development Programme (UNDP) to develop peace map and peace index initiatives aimed at strengthen national conflict prevention and peacebuilding frameworks
- The Ministry launched the Centralised Services E-Recruitment Portal (C-Serp) designed to provide a unified digital gateway for evaluating personnel into all the interior agencies
- In March 2026, the Ministry, in collaboration with the National Peace Council and the Dallaire Institute, launched the Dialoguing with the Youth in Selected Hotspots on Conflict Prevention initiative. The four-day program was intended to engage people from conflict-prone communities in discussions on conflict prevention, peace building, and resilience, and to provide training on identifying early warning signs of conflict and promoting peaceful coexistence

== Achievements ==
- Under the Mahama-led administration and the leadership of Mubarak Mohammed Muntaka, the National Peace Council resolved 429 conflict cases of which 168 were chieftaincy disputes, 105 were land-related conflict and 57 were ethnic disputes.
- The National Peace Council also established Local and Community Peace Committees in conflict-prone areas.
- The National Disaster Management Organization (NADMO) responded to 332 emergencies and conducted 2,268 field assessments.
