= Mohammed Salisu Bamba =

Ghanaian politician

Member of the Ghana Parliament for Ejura-Sekyedumase Constituency
- In office 7 January 2013 – 6 January 2017

Personal details
- Born: September 17, 1975 (age 51)
- Party: New Patriotic Party
- Education: University of Ghana BA.Phychology and History Kwame Nkrumah University of science and technology (KNUST) Master of public administration (MPA)
- Occupation: Agri business consultant, Farmer, Real Estate developer, Hotelier, Agricultural machinery and impliments dealer.
- Profession: Administrator

Mohammed Salisu Bamba (born September 17, 1975) is a Ghanaian politician and member of the Sixth Parliament of the Fourth Republic of Ghana representing the Ejura-Sekyedumase Constituency in the Ashanti Region on the ticket of the New Patriotic Party.

== Early life and education ==
Bamba was born on September 17, 1975. He hails from Yendi, a town in the Northern Region of Ghana. He attended the University of Ghana and obtained his Bachelor of Arts degree in psychology. He is a Muslim and is married with four children.

== Politics ==
Bamba is a member of the New Patriotic Party (NPP). In 2012, he contested for the Ejura-Sekyedumase seat on the ticket of the NPP in the 2012 Ghanaian general elections and won. During the elections, he garnered 21,461 votes which represents 49.78% of the total valid votes cast and hence defeated the other contestants. However, in 2016, he contested for the seat again and lost in the 2016 Ghanaian general elections, and as a result, he could represent his constituency for the second time.
