= Apeatse =

Suburb of Bogoso, Ghana

Apiate
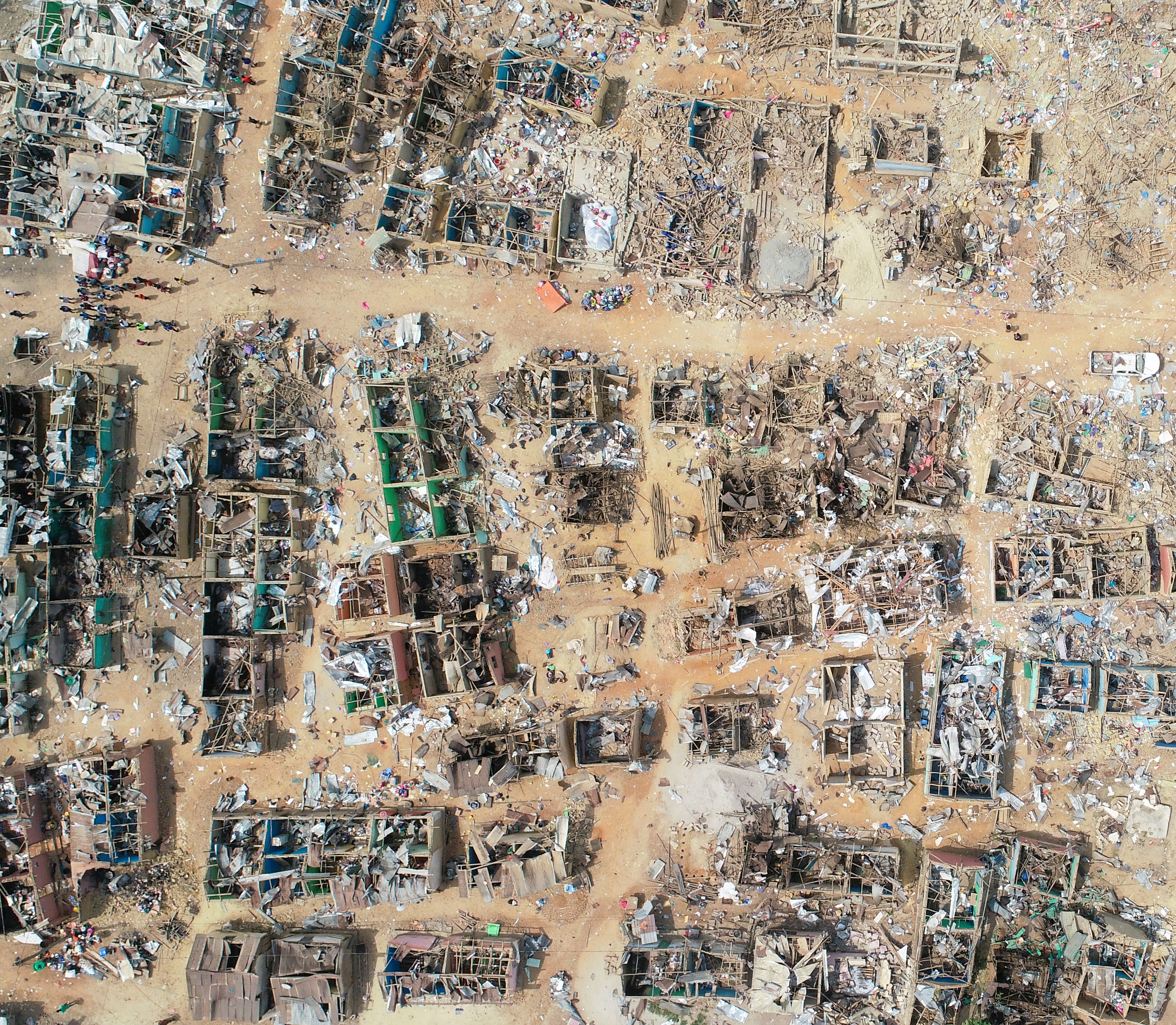
- Aftermath of explosion
- Date: 20 January 2022 (4 years ago)
- Location: Apiate near Bogoso, Western Region, Ghana; 05°35′06″N 02°02′47″W
- Cause: Collision
- Deaths: 17
- Injuries: 200

Apiate (also spelled Apeatse) is a suburban community near Bogoso, a town in the Prestea-Huni Valley District of Ghana’s Western Region. The settlement gained international attention following a catastrophic Explosion in January 2022.
