= Samuel Basintale Amadu =

Ghanaian immigration officer and public official

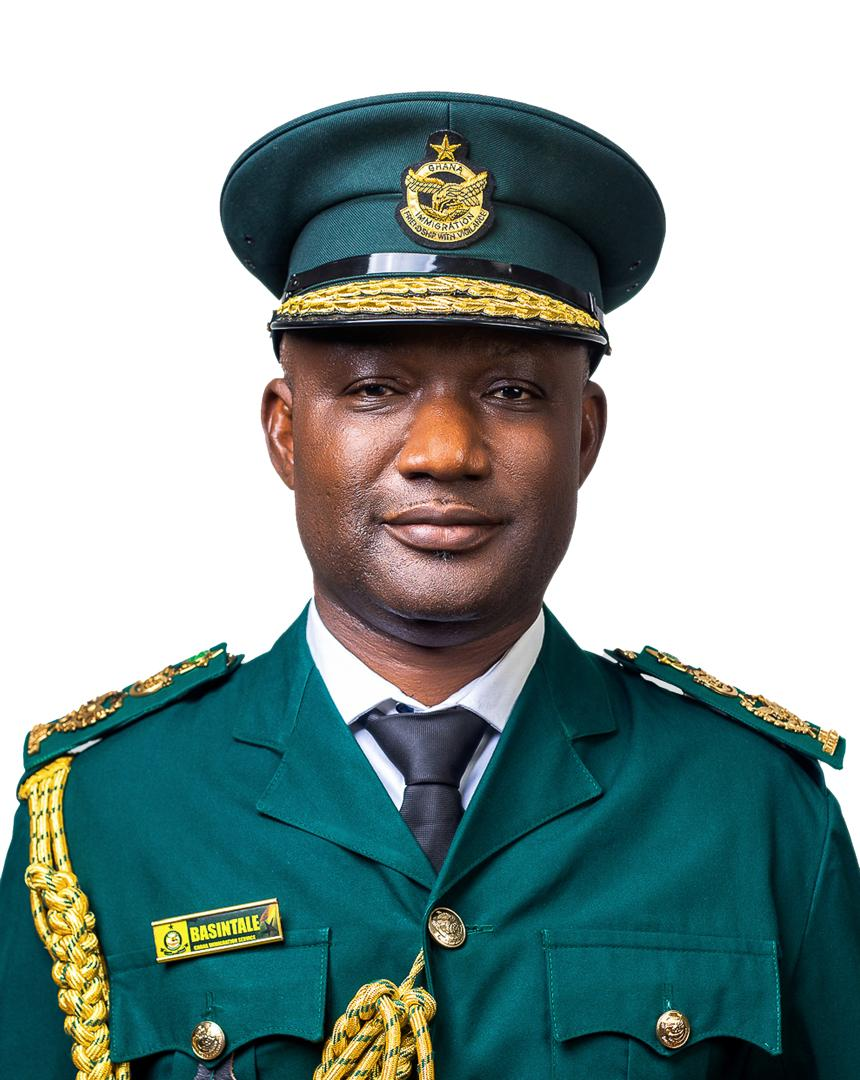
- Official Portrait, 2025

Comptroller-General of the Ghana Immigration Service
- Incumbent
- Assumed office March 2025
- President: John Dramani Mahama
- Preceded by: Kwame Asuah Takyi

Personal details
- Born: April 17, 1972 (age 53) Bawku, Upper East Region, Ghana
- Education: University of Ghana; Ghana Institute of Management and Public Administration
- Occupation: Immigration officer

Samuel Basintale Amadu is a Ghanaian immigration officer and public official who has served as Comptroller-General of the Ghana Immigration Service since March 2025. He has spent more than three decades in the Service, holding senior operational, administrative, and command positions prior to his appointment as its head.

== Early life and education ==
Samuel Basintale Amadu was born on 17 April 1972 in Bawku in the Upper East Region of Ghana. He studied at the University of Ghana, where he obtained a Bachelor of Arts degree in Psychology with Philosophy. He later earned a Postgraduate Certificate in Public Administration from the Ghana Institute of Management and Public Administration and a Master of Arts degree in International Affairs from the Legon Centre for International Affairs and Diplomacy, University of Ghana.

== Career ==
Amadu joined the Ghana Immigration Service on 1 September 1993. He was promoted to the rank of Assistant Superintendent of Immigration in November 2000 and subsequently served as Staff Officer at the Aflao Command and at the Western Europe Section at the Service’s national headquarters.

He later served as Head of the Ghana Passport Processing Section at the Service’s headquarters from 2005 to September 2008. From September 2008 to October 2009, he was Second-in-Command of the National Enforcement Department before being appointed Second-in-Command and Acting Commander at Accra International Airport, a position he held from October 2009 to 2017.

In May 2017, Amadu was appointed Head of Operations at the Service’s national headquarters and later served as Tema Regional Commander from October 2017 to May 2019. He was subsequently appointed Greater Accra Regional Commander, serving from May 2019 to May 2021, during which period he also headed the Service’s COVID-19 Technical Team beginning in March 2020.

From May 2021 to July 2022, he served as Head of Administration at the national headquarters and was thereafter appointed Bono Regional Commander, serving from July 2022 to September 2024. In September 2024, he was appointed Deputy Commissioner of Immigration (DCOI) at Large at the Service’s headquarters prior to his elevation to the position of Comptroller-General of Immigration on 14 March 2025.

== Comptroller-General of Immigration ==
In March 2025, Amadu was appointed Comptroller-General of the Ghana Immigration Service by President John Dramani Mahama, succeeding Kwame Asuah Takyi.

As Comptroller-General, he is responsible for the strategic leadership and administration of the Service, including border security management, immigration enforcement, and the implementation of immigration policy. During his tenure, he has overseen disciplinary reviews within the Service and immigration enforcement operations involving foreign nationals.
