= Oscar Ameyedowo =

Ghanaian politician

Hon. Oscar Ameyedowo

Member of parliament for South Tongu
- In office 7 January 1993 – 7 January 1997
- President: Jerry John Rawlings
- Preceded by: Godfried K. Agama
- Succeeded by: Kenneth Dzirasah

Personal details
- Died: November 2022
- Party: National Democratic Congress
- Occupation: Politician

Emmanuel Oscar Ameyedowo was a Ghanaian politician who was Ghana's Ambassador to China from 1997 to 2001 and Member of Parliament for South Tongu from 1993 to 1997.

== Early life ==
Ameyedowo was educated at Sogakofe Senior High School where he received his GCE Ordinary level certificate in 1967 and the Accra Academy for his Advanced level certificate from 1967 to 1969. He attended and graduated from the University of Ghana with a B.A. in Political Science and Modern History in 1972. He studied and received a diploma in industrial management in 1979 at the Kwame Nkrumah University of Science and Technology.

== Career ==
He taught at Tamale Senior High School from 1972 to 1974 and gained employment with the Social Security and National Insurance Trust from 1974 to 1981. He left for Nigeria where he became an educational instructor from 1982 to 1986. He returned to Ghana and became the Registrar of the Ghana Institute of Journalism from 1986 to 1992.

== Politics ==
Ameyedowo was elected as MP for South Tongu during the 1992 Ghanaian parliamentary election on the ticket of the National Democratic Congress (NDC). He chaired the Foreign Affairs Committee of the first parliament of the Fourth Republic. Ameyedowo did not contest the 1996 Ghanaian general election but was replaced by Kenneth Dzirasah of the NDC who retained the seat for the NDC. This was to allow Dzirasah to continue as first deputy speaker in accordance with new rules that asked that both deputy speakers belong to a caucus in parliament and hence be a member of parliament.

Ameyedowo was appointed Ghana's Ambassador to China by President Jerry Rawlings in 1997 and held this post until 2001.

Ameyedowo was appointed to the board of the National Lottery Authority by President John Mahama and was chairman of the board until 2017. In 2019, the NDC named Ameyedowo to its Vetting Committee for presidential flagbearer aspirants.
