= Kofi Portuphy =

Ghanaian politician

Ebenezer Kofi Ofori Portuphy is a Ghanaian politician and founding member of the NDC. He was the first national coordinator of the National Disaster Management Organization and later in January 2009. He contested for the National Chairmanship of National Democratic Congress party in December 2014 which he won.

== NADMO resignation ==
Kofi Portuphy resigned his position as NADMO boss in May 2015 due to pressure from civil society groups. The pressure was to ensure smooth running of the organisation and avoid conflict of interest issues.
