= 2015 Accra explosion =

Fatal petrol station fire and explosion in Ghana

- Accra (Ghana)
- Date: 3 June 2015
- Location: Accra, Ghana; 5°34′4.8″N 0°12′55.4″W
- Cause: Fuel fire, explosion, flooding
- Deaths: 256

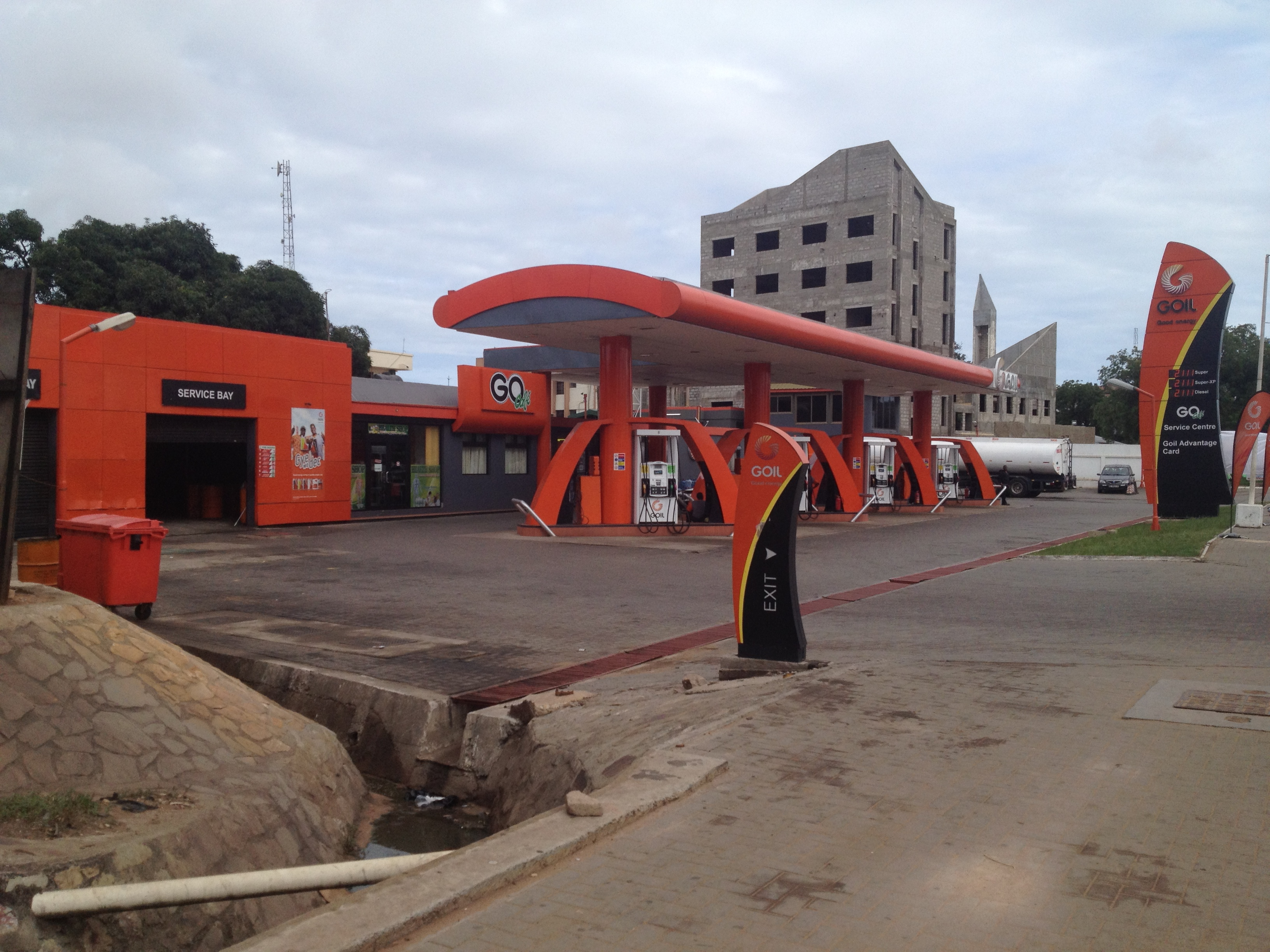
Goil gas station in Ghana.

On June 3, 2015, an explosion and a fire occurred at a petrol station in Ghana's capital city Accra, killing over 250 people.

== Explosion ==
The GOIL station, near Kwame Nkrumah Interchange in the city's downtown area, was being used as a shelter from heavy rains and flooding from several days of flooding in the city, and was packed with people, cars and buses, waiting to leave to their various destinations when the explosion occurred. The source of the explosion is unknown though believed to have occurred in the station's fuel tanks. One survivor stated that the power had gone out before the explosion, but after the power was restored, they heard a "pop" and then the fire erupted. About 96 people were taking shelter at the station before they were killed by the fire.

Due to the flooding, water had mixed in with the fuel, and when the tanks exploded, the water exacerbated the spread of the fire to nearby buildings, killing additional citizens. The ongoing rainfall and flooding made rescue efforts difficult. So many bodies were taken to the 37 Military Hospital, the largest specialist hospital in Ghana, that the morgue was overwhelmed.

== Reactions ==
Ghana's president John Dramani Mahama visited the site, and called for three days of mourning over the losses starting on 8 June 2015. He also authorized a GH₵ 60 million ($14.5 million) recovery fund. President Mahama stated that he would start to push for legislation to prevent building on waterways in order to prevent such accidents from happening again. The incident was the worst disaster for the country since the 2001 Accra Sports Stadium disaster, where 127 people were crushed in a stampede during a football match at Accra Sports Stadium.

The Cardinal Secretary of State, Pietro Cardinal Parolin, in the name of Pope Francis, sent a telegram of condolence for the victims of the explosion to the Right Reverend Joseph Osei-Bonsu, President of the Ghana Bishops' Conference.

== See also ==
- 2017 Atomic Junction gas explosion
- 2022 Bogoso explosion
