= Anita De Sosoo =

Ghanaian politician

- Jemima Anita De-Sosoo

National Disaster Management Organization
- President: John Dramani Mahama
- Preceded by: New position

Personal details
- Party: National Democratic Congress

Anita De Sosoo is a Ghanaian politician and the National Women's Organiser of the National Democratic Congress (NDC) and former member of the National Disaster Management Organization. Anita De Sosoo gained popularity when as a panelist on Adom FM she stated that magical dwarfs were responsible for the poor economy. Anita de Sosoo received widespread condemnation in her native Ghana.

Anita De Sosoo later resigned from her post.

== Education ==
Anita has a first degree from Ghana Institute of Management and Public Administration and currently enrolled in the Law School.
