= Douglas Asiedu =

Ghanaian police officer

DCOP Douglas Akrofi Asiedu is a Ghanaian police officer who served in the Ghana Police Service. He rose to the rank of Deputy Commander of Police and was appointed the Greater Accra Regional Police Commander. He later became a public servant and was the 4th national coordinator of the National Disaster Management Organization in Ghana.

== NADMO Coordinator ==
Douglas Asiedu was appointed by President John Kufour as the national coordinator of NADMO. He served in that capacity from January 2007 to December 2009.
