= Francis Sanziri =

Ghanaian military officer (1957–2019)

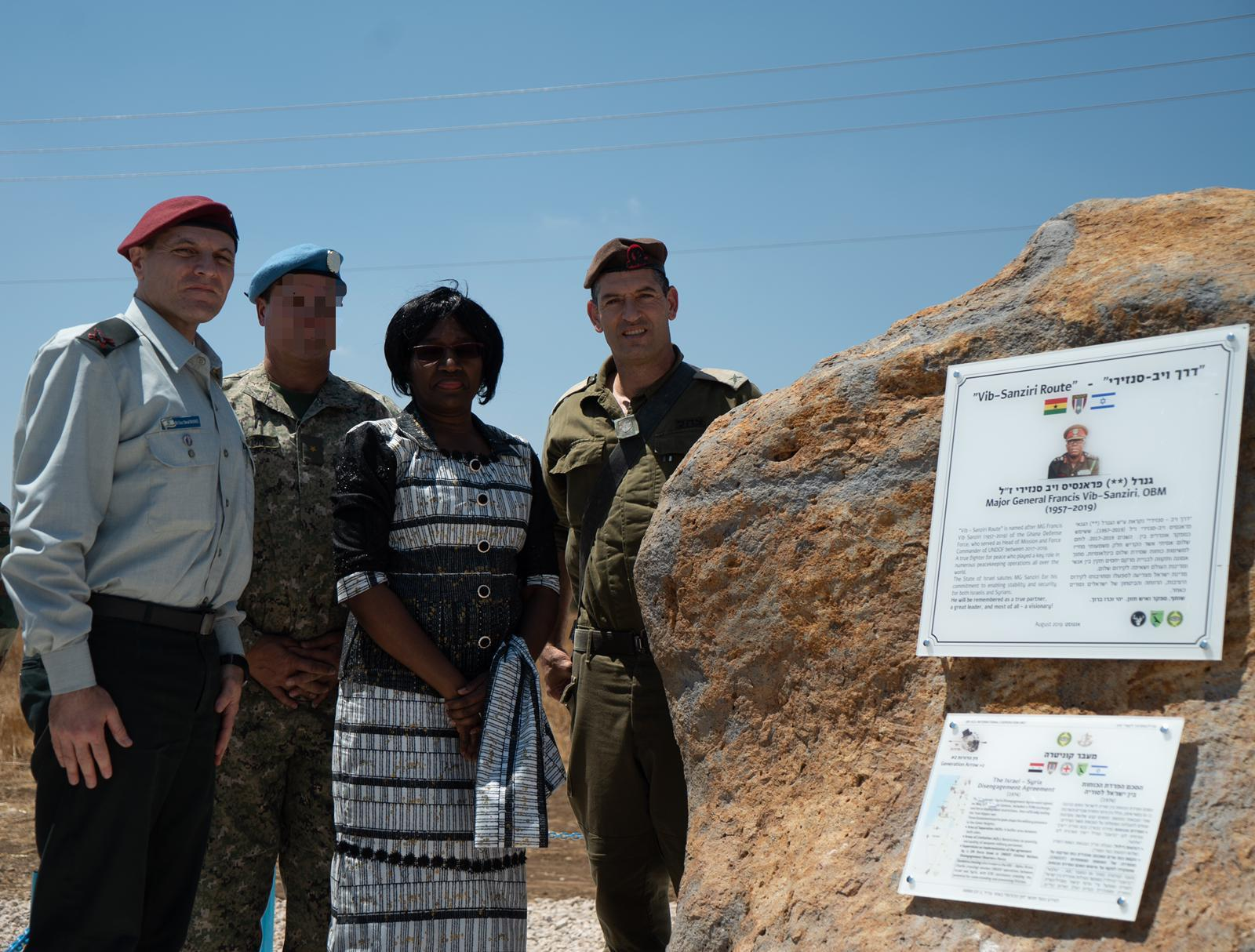
Cornerstone ceremony in the access road to Quneitra border crossing in Israel in the memory of Francis Vib Sanziri, July 2019

Francis Vib Sanziri (1957 – 19 April 2019) was a Ghanaian military officer who served in the Ghana Army. He rose to the rank of Major General and served as the Director General of Joint Operations at the General Headquarters of the Ghana Army in Accra. He was appointed by President John Dramani Mahama to serve as the 6th National Coordinator of the National Disaster Management Organization. He held the position from May 2015 to March 2017. He was appointed head of the UNDOF in October 2017.

He died of heart attack on 19 April 2019, at the age of 61.
