= Eastern Regional Hospital =

- Ministry of Health
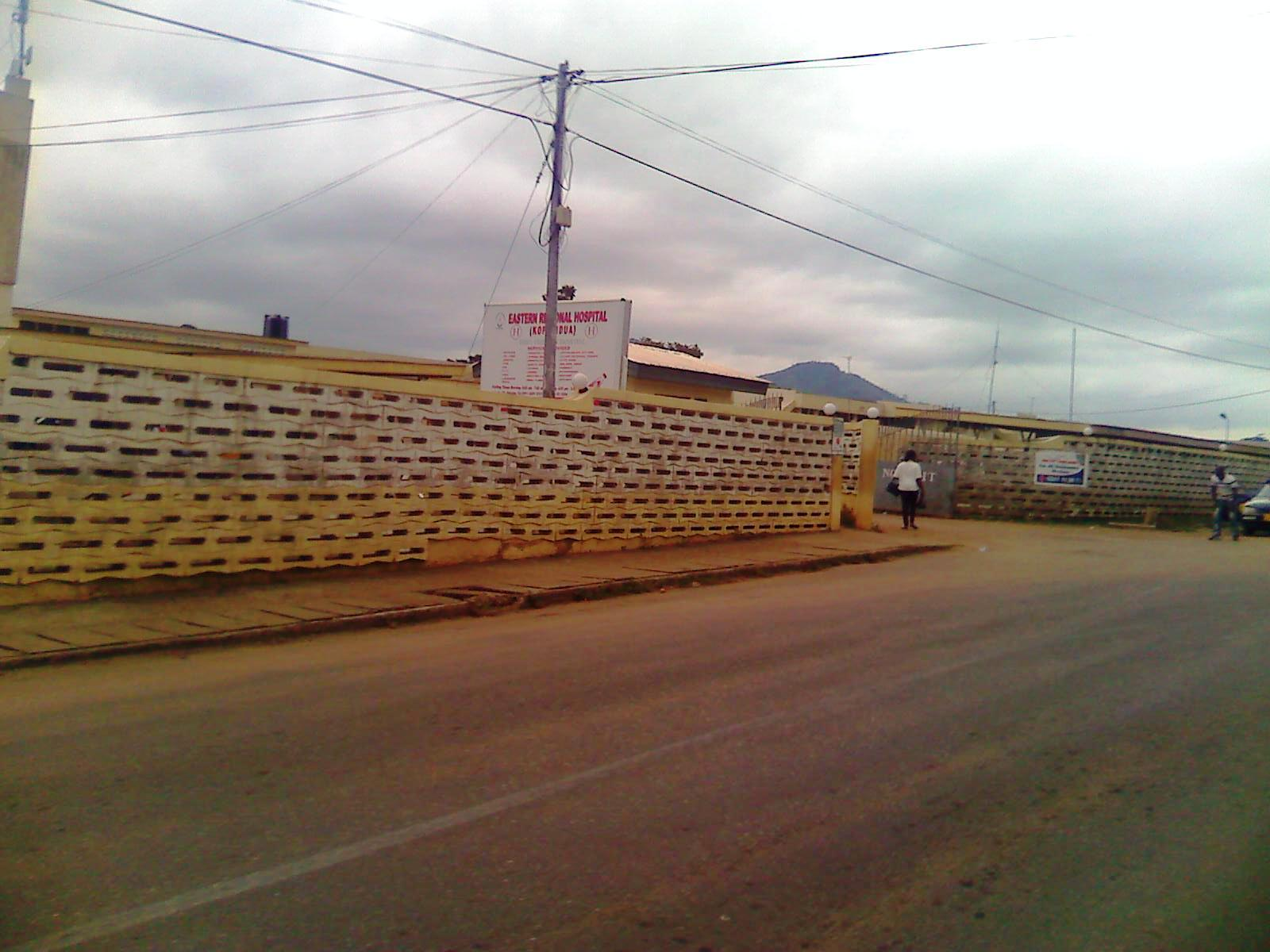

Geography
- Location: Koforidua, Eastern Region, Ghana
- Coordinates: 6.09766°N 0.25720°W

Organisation
- Care system: Public - Ghana Health Service
- Affiliated university: All Nations University

Services
- Emergency department: Yes

History
- Founded: 1959

Links
- Website: erhk.org
- Lists: Hospitals in Ghana

The Eastern Regional Hospital also known as Koforidua Regional Hospital is a regional and proposed teaching hospital in Koforidua in the Eastern region of Ghana. The Koforidua Regional Hospital was established in 1926. The hospital is located in the New Jauben Municipality in the Eastern Region.

== Emergencies ==
The hospital's emergency ward was renovated in 2020 to make room for more patients during the COVID-19 pandemic.
