= Joseph Odei =

Ghanaian military officer

Brigadier General (rtd) Joseph Odei is a Ghanaian military officer who served in the Ghana Army. He later became a public servant and was the 2nd national coordinator of the National Disaster Management Organization in Ghana.

== NADMO Coordinator ==
Joseph Odei was appointed by President John Kufour as the national coordinator of NADMO. He served in that capacity from January June 2001 to August 2006.
