= Regional hospitals of Ghana =

Ghana, since it independence from the British on 6 March 1957, has made great strides towards improving its health care facilities and the services offered in them. The Ghana Health Service, the health policy implementer of the Ministry of Health, has over the years developed the health care services offered to Ghanaians in the initial then (10) but now sixteen (16) administrative regions of the country.

== The 10 regional hospitals ==
The regional hospitals in Ghana are tabulated below.

Region	Hospital Name
Western	Effia Nkwanta Regional Hospital, Sekondi
Eastern	Regional Hospital, Koforidua
Central	Central Regional Hospital, Cape Coast
Northern	Tamale Regional Hospital
Greater Accra	Ridge Regional Hospital, Ridge, Accra
Bono	Regional Hospital, Sunyani
Upper East	Regional Hospital, Bolgatanga
Upper West	Regional Hospital, Wa
Volta	Ho Teaching Hospital
Ashanti	Suntreso Government Hospital , Kumasi
