= Central Regional Hospital, Cape Coast =

Hospital in Cape Coast, Central, Ghana

Central Regional Hospital

Geography
- Location: Central Region, Cape Coast, Ghana

Services
- Beds: 400

Links
- Lists: Hospitals in Ghana

The Central Regional Hospital, is a regional hospital in Cape Coast which is in the Central region of Ghana. It is now a teaching hospital and is known as the Cape-Coast Teaching Hospital (CCTH). It serves as a facility for medical students from the University of Cape Coast. It is also a center of learning for several nurses training colleges.

== Governing Board members ==
In the year 2020, the then Minister for health Kwaku Agyeman-Manu inaugurated the board of the Cape Coast Teaching Hospital (CCTH) tasking them to make service delivery to clients their priority. The membership was consist of 11 of which they are as follows;

- Nana Ehhnuborim Prah Agyensaim VI, Traditional Chief
- Ofosu Asamoah, Legal Practitioner
- Dr. Kwabena Opoku-Adusei, Principal Kintampo College of Health and Well-Being (COHK)
- Alberta Amissah Rockson, President Ghana Physiotherapy Association
- Philomina Adjoa Nyarkoa Woolley, Deputy Registrar Nurses and Midwives Council
- Delese Afia Amoako Mimi Darko, CEO, FDA
- Dr. Akwasi Anyanful, Researcher
- Dr. Nancy Innocentia Ebu Enyan m, Dean, School of Nursing Cape Coast University College
- Caxton Oduro-Donkor and
- Dr. Eric Kofi Ngyedu, CEO, CCTH

== Development ==
on the 4th of March 2026 the general hospital commissioned State of the art 33 bed eye surgical training center of excellence.the centre is commission by Ghana Minister of health.

== Medical Directors ==
The Medical director of the teaching hospital is DR. STEPHEN LARYEA. And the chief executive officer is DR. ERIC KOFI NGYEDU.
