= Effia Nkwanta Regional Hospital =

Hospital in Western region (Ghana)

Effia Nkwanta Regional Hospital is one of the ten regional hospitals of Ghana located in the Western Region. It is a secondary health facility which also receives referrals from the Western corridor of Ghana. It was established in 1938 as military hospital by the Gold Coast government. The hospital is located in the Sekondi-Takoradi Metropolis.

Nana Addo Dankwa Akufo-Addo, the President of the Republic of Ghana has uncover a statue of himself at the entrance of Effia Nkwanta Regional Hospital in Sekondi as part of his one day "thank you" tour of the Western Region. Western Regional Minister, Kwabena Okyere Darko Mensah declared that the statue was put up in honour of the President for the diverse initiatives he has undertaken.

On the part of the President, he said he has achieved 80 percent of the promises made to the people of Ghana.

== History ==
Founded in 1938, the hospital has grown into a major healthcare provider in the region.

== Location ==
It is located in Takoradi in the Western Region of Ghana.
