= Ejura-Sekyedumase (Ghana parliament constituency) =

Constituency in the Ashanti Region of Ghana

Coordinates: 7.412°N 1.377°W

- constituency for the Parliament of Ghana
- District: District
- Region: Ashanti Region of Ghana

Current constituency
- Created: 2016
- Party: National Democratic Congress
- MP: Muhammad Bawah Braimah

Ejura-Sekyedumase is one of the constituencies represented in the Parliament of Ghana. It elects one Member of Parliament (MP) by the first past the post system of election. Ejura-Sekyedumase is located in the Ejura-Sekyedumase district of the Ashanti Region of Ghana.

== Boundaries ==
The seat is located within the Ejura–Sekyedumase District of the Ashanti Region of Ghana. It shares boundaries with Mampong Constituency, Nkoranza south constituency and Atebubu Amantin constituency respectively.

== Members of Parliament ==
| Election | Member | Party | Ref |
|---|---|---|---|
| 1992 | Peter Boakye Ansah | National Democratic Congress | |
| 1996 | Peter Boakye Ansah | National Democratic Congress | |
| 2000 | Sampson Atakora | National Democratic Congress | |
| 2004 | Issifu Pangabu Mohammed | National Democratic Congress | |
| 2008 | Issifu Pangabu Mohammed | National Democratic Congress | |
| 2012 | Mohammed S. Bamba | New Patriotic Party | |
| 2016 | Muhammad Bawah Braimah | National Democratic Congress | |
| 2020 | Muhammad Bawah Braimah | National Democratic Congress | |
| 2024 | | | |

== Elections ==
2008 Ghanaian parliamentary election:Ejura-Sekyedumase Source:Ghana Home Page
| Party | Candidate | Votes | % | ±% |
|---|---|---|---|---|
| National Democratic Congress | Alhaji Issifu Pangabu Mohammed | 20,038 | 51.9 | — |
| New Patriotic Party | Dr. Josuah Ayarkwa | 17,312 | 44.8 | — |
| Independent | Yusif Mohammed Kpajal | 538 | 1.4 | — |
| Convention People's Party | Joseph Sanwok Lambon | 376 | 1.0 | — |
| People's National Convention | Patrick Kweku Konadu | 218 | 0.6 | — |
| Democratic Freedom Party | K.K. Nti Oliver | 136 | 0.4 | — |
| Majority | | 2,726 | 7.1 | — |

== See also ==
- List of Ghana Parliament constituencies
