= Illegal immigration to Ghana =

Illegal immigration in a country

The Ghana Immigration Service (GIS) is in charge of the removal and deportation of illegal immigrants in Ghana.

The Ghanaian government has agreed to work with other Government and international agencies to prevent illegal immigration inside and outside the country.

== Terminology ==
Illegal immigration describes people entering a country without formal permission. There are many views on illegal immigration, depending on political standpoint:

- illegal alien
- illegal immigrant
- clandestine workers
- sans papiers / "without papers"
- irregular immigrant/migrant/alien/worker/resident
- people "hiding/living/staying/working/ in the shadows"
- undocumented immigrant/migrant/alien/worker/resident
- unauthorized immigrant/migrant/alien/worker/resident
- paperless immigrant/migrant/alien/worker/resident
- immigrant "without immigration/legal status"
- out of status immigrant/migrant/alien/worker/resident
- unnaturalized immigrant/migrant/alien/worker/resident
- boat people

Many types of migrants are considered illegal immigrant, this includes those without any travel documents, refugee, runaway workers, workers working in different sectors than those stated in their work permit, overstay, fake travel documents, fake work permit, fake Ghana Card, fake UN Cards, stateless people as well as those born in Ghana by illegal immigrants.

== Demographics ==
In 2010, it was estimated by the Ghanaian government that there were 3.1 million aliens and that the number of illegal immigrants was as high as 3.1 million in both South and North Ghana, including refugees. The nations home to the highest percentages of the illegal immigrant population were Nigeria, Burkina Faso, Mali, Togo, Ivory Coast, Benin, Liberia, Niger, and Cameroon. From a little over 3,000,000 as at 1952/53 Ghana population had steadily grown to nearly 6,000,000 between 1957 and 1960 mainly through immigration at the time of the "Ghana Aliens Compliance Order" with foreigners alone forming over 20% of Ghana’s population in the 1960s. By reason of reversal of frontier rules due to changes in government and deportation policies, Ghana in 2013 houses approximately 20 million inhabitants. An overwhelming majority of beggars on the streets of Ghana in Accra, Kumasi, Tamale, Takoradi and the major Regional and District capitals are illegal immigrants.

=== Source countries by types of activity ===
- Normal jobs (service, retail, mining etc.) - Nigeria, Benin, Ivory Coast, Togo, and Liberia
- Beggars - Nigeria, Mali, Niger, Benin, Burkina Faso, Togo, Liberia, and Cameroon
- Human trafficking/prostitution - Nigeria, Ivory Coast, and Togo

== Illegal Immigrants ==
Due to Ghana's emerging economy and rapidly developing standard of living; thousands of illegal immigrants have smuggled into Ghana to seek greener pastures. In 2013, Ghana began the deportation of all illegal immigrants in Ghana for illegally engaging in the Ghana mining (galamsey), agriculture, and retailing industries; among other crimes. Illegal immigrants and aliens in Ghana specifically concluded; 2.6 million Nigerian nationals, 0.3 million Burkinabe nationals, Togolese, Ivorians, Nigeriens, Malians; and mostly nationals from west Africa and elsewhere in Africa 0.2 million.

== Crackdown and Deportation ==
=== Ghana Aliens Compliance Order (GACO) ===
In 1969, under the "Ghana Aliens Compliance Order" (GACO) enacted by Ghanaian Prime Minister Kofi Abrefa Busia; Nigerians and other African and non-African immigrants were forced to leave Ghana as they made up 20 percent of Ghana's population at the time, and Ghana deported over 3 million Nigerians and other African and non-African immigrants in 3 months. In April 2013, 120 foreign Chinese nationals were deported from Ghana for illegally engaging in mining and possessing false work permits. More Chinese nationals have been deported since then.
