= Bogoso =

- Municipal Capital
- Nickname: Bogoo
- Location in Ghana
- Coordinates: 05°34′07″N 02°00′21″W
- Country: Ghana
- Region: Western Region
- Municipal: Prestea-Huni Valley Municipal
- Elevation: 300 ft (90 m)

Population
  - Estimate: over 50,000

Bogoso is the Capital town of the Prestea-Huni Valley Municipal District in the Western Region of Ghana. It's known for its rich gold mining activities and agricultural production.

== History ==
Bogoso's history is tied to gold mining, which has driven its economy since the colonial era. The town grew significantly in the 20th century with the establishment of mining companies like Golden Star Resources (Bogoso/Prestea Mine).

A tragic explosion occurred in Apiate, a Suburb of Bogoso on January 20, 2022, when a track transporting mining explosives collided with a motorcycle, killing over 12 people and injuring dozens.

== Geography ==
Bogoso lies approximately 30 km northeast of Tarkwa and 50 km southeast of Takoradi. It is situated in a tropical rainforest zone, with seasonal rainfall supporting agriculture.

== Economy ==
- Mining: Bogoso is a hub for small-scale and industrial gold mining. The Bogoso/Prestea Mine, operated by Future Global Resources (FGR) as of 2023, has faced criticism for environmental and safety issues.
- Agriculture: Major crops include cocoa, oil palm, and cassava. Many residents engage in subsistence farming.

== Demographics ==
According to the 2010 Ghana Population and Housing Census, Bogoso had a population of 13,753. The Akan ethnic groups are predominant, with Fiase and Fante (Twi) as widely spoken languages.

== Infrastructure ==
- Transport: Bogoso is connected to the N1 highway, linking it to Accra and Takoradi. Public transport includes shared taxis ("trotros").
- Healthcare: The Bogoso Government Hospital and private clinics serve the town.
- Education: Public, Private, primary, and junior high schools exist, alongside St. Augustine Senior High School.

== Notable events ==
- 2022 Explosion: The accidental detonation of mining explosives in Apiate, a suburb of Bogoso, in 2022 drew national attention to safety concerns in artisanal mining.

=== Commodities ===
- Gold
- Diamonds
- Cocoa

=== Rock types ===
- Basalt
- Mylonite
- Shale
