= Sampson Atakora =

Ghanaian politician

MP forEjura Sekyedumasi
- In office 7 January 2001 – 6 January 2005
- President: John Agyekum Kufour

Personal details
- Born: Ejura Sekyedumasi, Ashanti Region
- Party: National Democratic Congress
- Occupation: Politician

Sampson Atakora is a Ghanaian Politician and a member of the Third Parliament of the Fourth Republic representing the Ejura Sekyedumasi in the Ashanti Region of Ghana.

== Early life and education ==
Atakora was born at Ejura Sekyedumasi, a town in the Ashanti Region of Ghana.

== Politics ==
Atakora was first elected into parliament on the Ticket of the National Democratic Congress during the 2000 Ghanaian General Elections. He polled 10,787 votes out of the 25,679 valid votes cast representing 42.00% He was defeated by Alhaji Issifu Pangabu Mohammed in the 2004 party's primary elections.

== Career ==
Atakora is an Engineer at the Community Water and Sanitation Agency. He also is a former member of Parliament for the Ejura Sekyedumasi Constituency in the Ashanti Region of Ghana.

== Arrest ==
On October 19, 2004, he was arrested for visa fraud. It was alleged that he tried to use fake birth certificates to acquire America visa for his two children.
