= Maxwell Kwame Lukutor =

Ghanaian politician

Maxwell Kwame Lukutor (born March 16, 1974) is a Ghanaian politician and a member of the ninth parliament of the fourth Republic of Ghana for South Tongu constituency located in the Volta Region of Ghana.

== Early life and education ==
Maxwell Kwame Lukutor was born in 1974, hails from Tefle in the Volta Region of Ghana. He finished his O-Level at Sogakope Senior High School in June 1993. He studied at the Kwame Nkrumah University of Science and Technology where he obtained BSC Geodetic Engineering in June 2001. He later on obtained a Commonwealth Executive Masters in Public Administration in June 2019 in KNUST,IDL.

== Political career ==
Among the roles he played were the president of Ghana Institution of Surveyors in Volta Region, member of the Ghana Institution Engineers, executive positions in the Licensed Surveyors, Association of Ghana, a member of the Volta Regional Lands Commission as well as a leader in the Sogasco Old Students' Association. He is the CEO of Global Surveys. He is also the managing director of the Malmaxi Group of Companies. He won the primaries after he failed three times and secured 597 votes to beat the incumbent member of parliament, Kobena Mensah Woyome who had 562 votes.

== Personal life ==
Maxwell Kwame Lukutor is a Christian.
