= National Disaster Management Organization =

Government agency in Ghana

National Disaster Management Organisation

Agency overview
- Formed: 1996
- Jurisdiction: Republic of Ghana
- Headquarters: Ghana
- Minister responsible: Major(rtd) Dr. Joseph Bikanyi Kuyon, Director General of NADMO
- Website: Official website

The National Disaster Management Organisation (NADMO) is the government agency that is responsible for the management of disasters as well as other emergencies in Ghana. The board operates under Ghana's Ministry of Interior.

== History ==
Ghana formed the National Disaster Management Organisation in 1996, backed by an act of Parliament (Act 927) to manage disasters and emergencies. This was after Ghana had responded to the United Nations Declaration GAD 44/236 of 1989 declaring 1990 to 1999 as the International Decade for Natural Disaster Reduction (IDNDR).

NADMO is part of the Ghana Ministry of Interior. It has a board of directors selected from, the Ministries of Health, Finance, Social Welfare, Interior, Information, National Mobilization Programme, Ghana Armed Forces, and non-governmental organizations (NGOs), among others. The first board was chaired by, Brig. (Rtd.) Dr. G. K. Deh, Director of Medical Services (DMS), Ghana Armed Forces

Prior to the formation of NADMO, the National Mobilization Programme—set up after the 1982–1983 crises of drought, bushfires, famine, and the deportation of 1.2 million Ghanaians from Nigeria—served as the implementing agency of the Disaster Relief Committee. After the formation, Kofi Portuphy, a member of the Relief Committee who had been instrumental in coordinating the drafting of the Act, became the first National Coordinator of NADMO.

Below is a table of all the Director Generals of NADMO:

	Year	Director General
1	Jan 1997 − June 2001	Kofi Portuphy
2	June 2001 − August 2006	Brigadier General (retired) Joseph Odei
3	August 2006 − December 2007	Hon George Isaac Amoo
4	January 2007 − December 2009	DCOP Douglas Akrofi Asiedu
5	January 2009 − May 2015	Kofi Portuphy
6	May 2015 – March 2017	Brig Gen Francis Vib Sanziri
7	March 2017 −	Eric Nana Agyeman-Prempeh

== Functions ==
NADMO performs specific functions which are all aimed at ensuring that in times of emergency, the government is ready to support relief efforts. These functions are:

1. Rehabilitation services for victims of disasters
2. Mobilization of people at various levels of society to support governmental programmes
3. Ensuring the preparedness of the country in the management of disasters
4. Coordinating the activities of various governmental and non-governmental agencies in the management of disasters.

The organization's mandate includes response to earthquakes, floods and rainstorms, and market fires.

== Presence ==
The mandate of NADMO stipulates that it offers relief support in times of emergencies in any location of the country. As such, the organization has structured its offices on the national, regional, district and zonal levels.

== Challenges ==
A major challenge that NADMO faces is lack of adequate resources to function effectively. This challenge was highlighted in March 2011, when the arrival of 16,700 Ghanaian returnees from Libya and 7,000 returnees from Côte d'Ivoire overstretched the board's resources. During such periods, appeals are sent out to the donor community for aid in the form of food, medicine, clothing, tents, mattresses, and other materiel to enable NADMO to provide basic necessities to those in need.

== 2011 Ivorian crisis ==
Over 5000 refugees entered Ghana during the post-election violence that erupted after the Ivorian presidential elections of 2011. The results of the elections showed opposition leader Alassane Ouattara won the majority of the votes cast. He was declared winner of the presidential election by the electoral body, but the then incumbent President Laurent Gbagbo, who was declared winner by the Constitutional Council, declared he would not hand over power to Mr. Ouattara. In the wake of violent protests, thousands of Ivorians fled to neighbouring countries, including Ghana. It was announced in March 2011 that NADMO would establish five refugee camps in the regions that shared a border with the Côte d'Ivoire to aid these refugees. NADMO received support from other agencies such as the Ghana Refugee Board, the Catholic Secretariat, UN High Commissioner for Refugees, UNICEF, UN Population Fund, and other NGOs for the provision of humanitarian services to potential asylum seekers.

== See also ==
- Ministry of Interior (Ghana)
- Anita De Sosoo
