= Refugee Board (Ghana) =

Ghana Refugee Board
Agency overview
- Formed: 1992
- Jurisdiction: Republic of Ghana
- Headquarters: Ghana
- Agency executive: Shaka ballo, Chairman
- Website: www.grb.gov.gh

The Ghana Refugee Board was established under the Ghana Refugee Law 1992 (PNDCL 305D), and is charged with the management of activities relating to refugees in Ghana. It is under the control of the Ministry of the Interior.

== Functions of the board ==
The main preoccupation of the Refugee Board is with refugees. Its functions include:

- interviewing individuals seeking refugee status
- granting refugee status to asylum seekers from areas of civil conflict or places where they face political persecution.
- oversight over all refugee camps in the country.

The board also cooperates with other agencies to carry out its mandate, as it did in March 2011 faced with an influx of refugees from Côte d'Ivoire (Ivory Coast), who had fled during the Second Ivorian Civil War.

== Head of the board ==
The head of the Refugee Board is Chairman Kenneth Dzirasah. Dzirasah was the Former First Deputy Speaker of Parliament and succeeded Emmanuel Owusu Bentil.

== Liberian refugees ==
The Budumburam Camp in the Central Region of Ghana is home to over 11,000 Liberian refugees. These refugees have lived in the camp for over two decades since they fled the civil war in that country. In 2008, about 500 Liberian refugees in the camp embarked on an "indefinite sit-down strike". This was to draw attention to the perceived unsatisfactory arrangements to have them repatriated to Liberia in that year. Of the 11,000 Liberian refugees, only 198 have accepted repatriation back to Liberia as of 2008.

The refugees are requesting resettlement in another country, but the Refugee Board maintains that no country is willing to accept them. The Refugee Board has now prepared plans for integrating in Ghana those refugees who are not repatriated, a move which is being strongly opposed by the refugees.

== Refugees from Côte d'Ivoire ==
In March 2011, refugees fleeing the fighting in the Second Ivorian Civil War entered Ghana. In total, some 116,000 Ivorians fled to eight West African countries, including Ghana, Mali, Burkina Faso, Guinea, Liberia, Togo, Benin and Nigeria. Ghana received 3,129 new refugees, mainly from the Ivorian capital of Abidjan and its suburbs. The UNHCR set up a transit centre at the Elubo border crossing.

The Refugee Board partnered with the UNHCR and Ghanaian state agencies such as NADMO to assist these refugees. After the setting up of the transit centre, the Refugee Board is looking for land to convert into a temporary shelter for the refugees, ahead of building a more permanent place in the Elembelle constituency. The UNHCR also set up a refugee camp in the town of Ampain that could hold 3,000 people.

== See also ==
- Ministry of Interior (Ghana)
