= Ghana National Fire and Rescue Service =

Ghana's nationwide fire service

Agency overview
- Established: 1997
- Employees: 18,000
- Staffing: 6,000 management and support staff; 800 communications centre staff
- Fire chief: Daniella Mawusi Ntow Sapong

Facilities and equipment
- Stations: 140

Website
- https://www.gnfs.gov.gh/

The Ghana National Fire and Rescue Service (GNFRS) is an agency under the Ghanaian Ministry of the Interior, constituting Ghana's nationwide fire service. It was established under Act 219 to Extinguish fires and provide humanitarian services and re-established by Act 537 in 1997 with a broad objective of prevention and management of undesired fires and other related matters. That includes inspection of high rise and commercial buildings equipped with the necessary fire engineering, Organize and education the public on the hazards of fire, Road Traffic extrication and other matters related.

== Change in name of the Ghana fire service ==
In March 2010, it was announced that the Ghana National Fire Service was to change its name to the Ghana National Fire and Rescue Service. The new mandate of the service was to operate both fire and ambulance services.

== Gallery ==
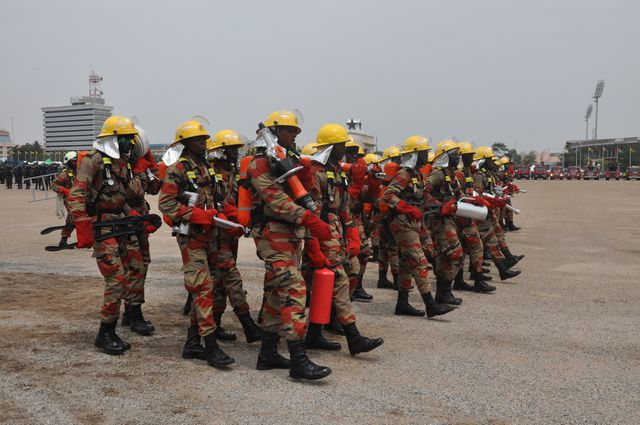
Ghana National Fire and Rescue Service (GNFRS) Firefighters.

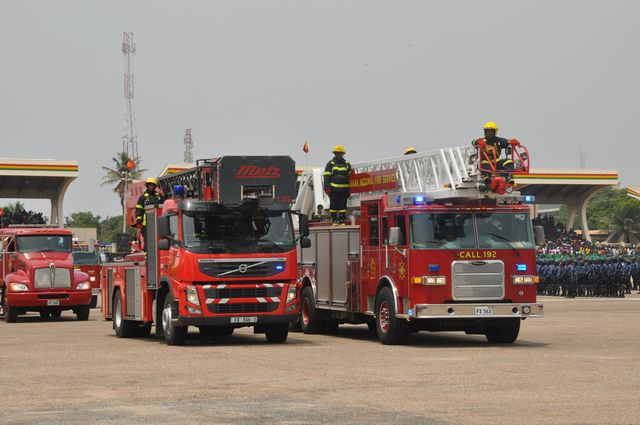
Ghana National Fire and Rescue Service (GNFRS) Fire Engines.

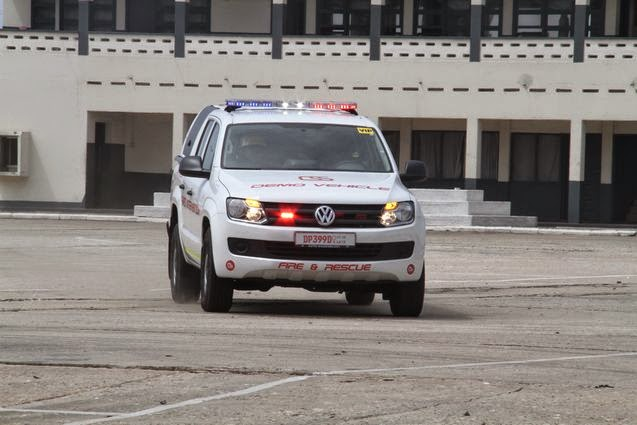
Ghana National Fire and Rescue Service (GNFRS) Rapid Intervention Fire Tender.

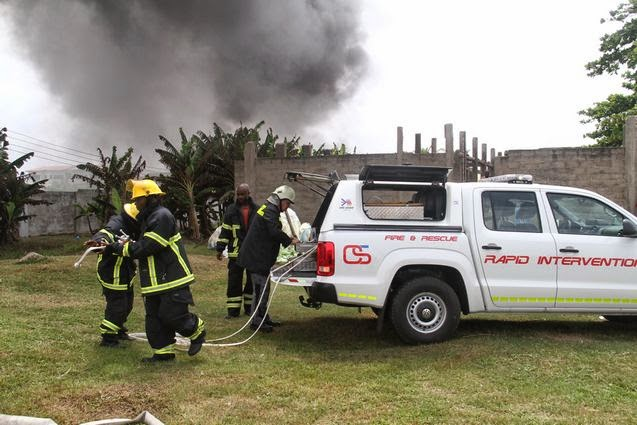
Ghana National Fire and Rescue Service (GNFRS) Rapid Intervention Fire Tender.

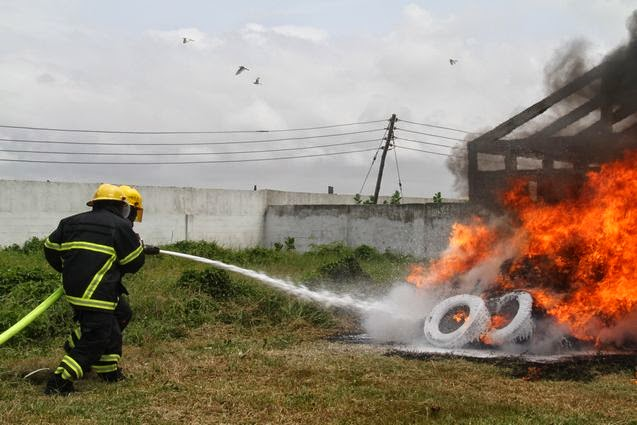
Ghana National Fire and Rescue Service (GNFRS) Rapid Intervention Firefighters Firefighting.
