= Cabinet of John Mahama =

Ghanaian cabinet

Cabinet of President John Mahama
- Cabinet of Ghana
- Date formed: February 2025

People and organisations
- Head of state: John Mahama
- Head of government: John Mahama
- Member party: National Democratic Congress (Ghana)
- Status in legislature: Majority
- Opposition party: New Patriotic Party

History
- Outgoing election: December 2024
- Predecessor: Cabinet of Nana Akufo-Addo
- Successor: Incumbent

The Cabinet of President John Dramani Mahama consists of the ministers of state appointed by Ghanaian President John Mahama during his second term in office. The cabinet takes responsibility for making key government decisions in Ghana following the 2024 Ghanaian general elections. The president announced his cabinet in February 2025.

== Formation ==
The Cabinet was formed in February 2025 and consists of nineteen ministers of state.

== List ==
Portrait	Portfolio	Incumbent	Term
	Ministry of Finance and Economic Planning (Ghana)	Cassiel Ato Forson	2025 -
	Ministry of Interior (Ghana)	Mubarak Mohammed Muntaka	2025 -
	Ministry of Health (Ghana)	Kwabena Mintah Akandoh	2025 -
	Ministry of Defence (Ghana)	Edward Omane Boamah	2025 -
	Office of Attorney General and Ministry of Justice	Dominic Akuritinga Ayine	2025 -
	Ministry of Energy	John Abdulai Jinapor	2025 -
	Ministry of Education	Haruna Iddrisu	2025 -
	Ministry of Trade and Industry|Ministry of Trade, Agribusiness and Industry	Elizabeth Ofosu-Adjare	2025 -
	Ministry of Lands and Natural Resources	Emmanuel Armah Kofi Buah	2025 -
	Ministry of Foreign Affairs	Samuel Okudzeto Ablakwa	2025 -
	Ministry of Food and Agriculture	Eric Opoku	2025 -
	Ministry of Communication, Digital Technology an Innovations	Sam Nartey George	2025 -
	Ministry of Roads and Highways	Kwame Governs Agbodza	2025 -
	Ministry of Environment, Science, Technology and Innovation	Ibrahim Murtala Muhammed	2025 -
	Ministry of Works, housing and Water Resources	Kenneth Gilbert Adjei	2025 -
	Ministry of local Government, Chieftaincy and Religious Affairs	Ahmed Ibrahim	2025 -
	Ministry of Women and Children's Affairs	Agnes Naa Momo Lartey	2025 -
	Ministry of Transport	Joseph Bukari	2025 -
	Ministry of Employment and Labour Relations	Abdul-Rashid Pelpuo	2025 -

== See also ==
- Cabinet of Ghana
- Mahama government from 2025
- Second presidency of John Mahama
