= Cabinet of Nana Akufo-Addo =

Ghanaian cabinet

Cabinet of President Nana Akufo-Addo
- Cabinet of Ghana
- Date formed: May 2016

People and organisations
- Head of state: Nana Akufo-Addo
- Head of government: Nana Akufo-Addo
- Member party: New Patriotic Party
- Opposition party: National Democratic Congress

History
- Predecessor: Cabinet of President John Dramani Mahama
- Successor: Cabinet of John Mahama

The Cabinet of President Nana Akufo-Addo consists of the ministers of state appointed by Ghanaian President Nana Akufo-Addo. The cabinet takes responsibility for making key government decisions in Ghana following the 2016 elections. The president announced his cabinet in May 2017.

== Formation ==
The Cabinet was formed in May 2017 and consists of nineteen ministers of state.

== List ==
Portrait	Portfolio	Incumbent	Term
	Ministry of Trade and Industry	Alan Kyeremanten	2017 -
	Ministry of Finance	Ken Ofori-Atta	2017 -
	Ministry of Defence	Dominic Nitiwul	2017 -
	Ministry of the Interior	Ambrose Dery	2017 -
	Ministry of Energy	Boakye Agyarko	2017 -
	Office of Attorney General and Ministry of Justice	Gloria Akuffo	2017 -
	Ministry of Foreign Affairs	Shirley Ayorkor Botchway	2017 -
	Ministry of Food and Agriculture	Dr. Owusu Afriyie Akoto	2017 -
	Ministry of Education	Dr. Matthew Opoku Prempeh	2017 -
	Ministry of Health	Kwaku Agyemang-Manu	2017 -
	Minister of Monitoring and Evaluation	Dr. Anthony Akoto Osei	2017 -
	Ministry of Regional Reorganization and Development	Dan Kweku Botwe	2017 -
	Ministry of Lands and Natural Resources	John Peter Amewu	2017 -
	Ministry of Sanitation and Water Resources	Joseph Kofi Adda	2017 -
	Ministry of Railway Development	Joe Ghartey	2017 -
	Ministry of Employment and Labour Relations	Ignatius Bafuor Awuah	2017 -
	Ministry of Transport	Kweku Ofori Asiamah	2017 -
	Ministry of Tourism, Arts and Culture	Catherine Afeku	2017 -
	Ministry of Special Development Initiative	Mavis Hawa Koomson	2017 -
	Ministry of Fisheries and Aquaculture Development	Elizabeth Afoley Quaye	2017 -
	Ministry of Roads and Highways	Kwasi Amoako Atta	2017 -
	Ministry of Youth and Sports	Isaac Kwame Asiamah	2017 -
	Deputy minister (Ghana)	William Owuraku Aidoo	

== See also ==
- Cabinet of Ghana
