= Dan Botwe =

Ghanaian politician (born 1958)

Hon. Dan Botwe Former MP
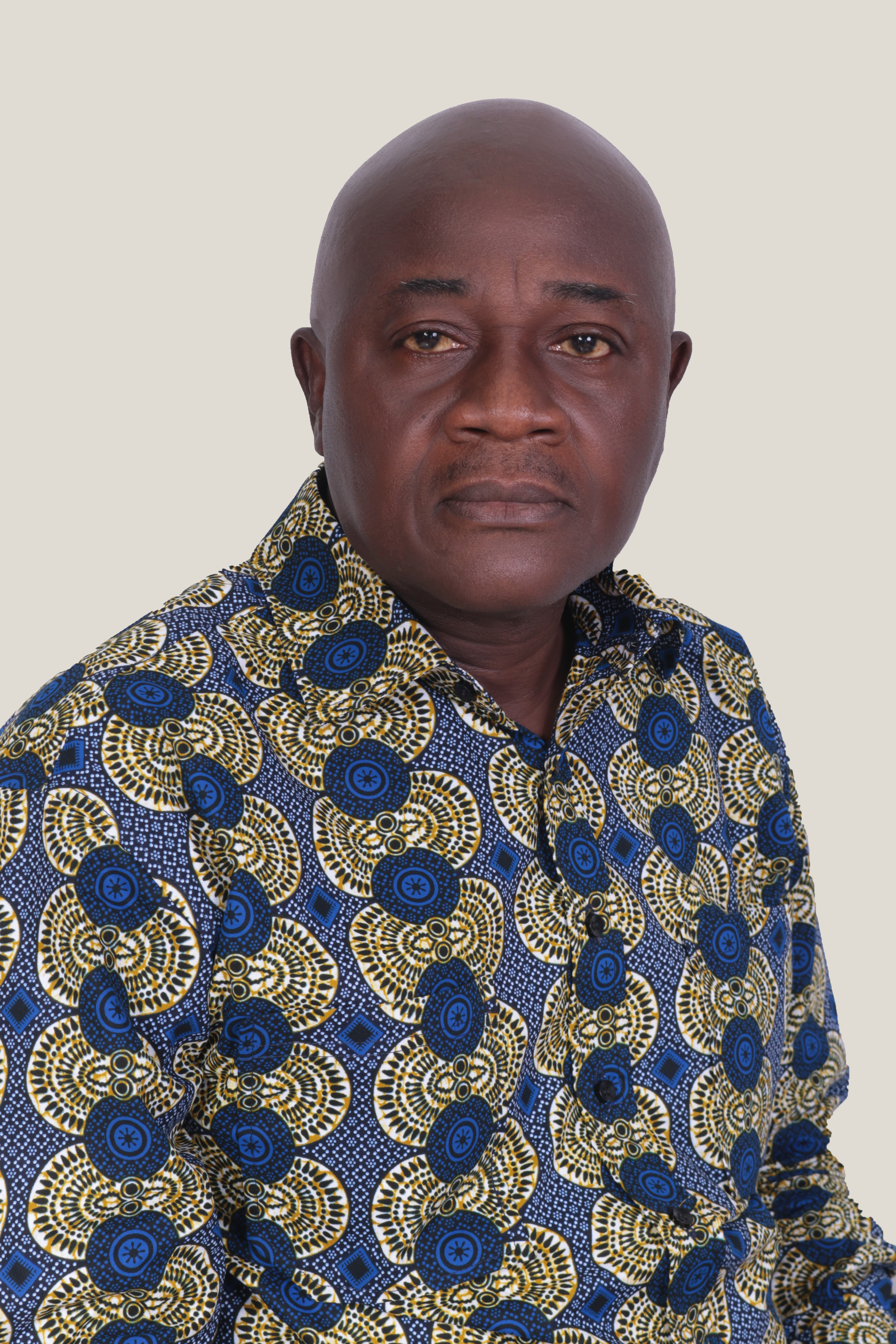
- Image of Dan Botwe

Former Member of Parliament for Okere
- In office 7 January 2009 – 6 January 2025
- Preceded by: Brandford Kwame Daniel Adu
- Succeeded by: Daniel Nana Addo-Kenneth

Minister for Information and National Orientation
- In office 2005–2006
- President: John Kufuor
- Preceded by: Nana Akomea
- Succeeded by: Kwamina Bartels

Ministry of Regional Reorganization and Development
- In office February 2017 – 14 February 2024
- President: Nana Akufo-Addo
- Preceded by: (New Ministry)

Personal details
- Born: Dan Kweku Botwe; 26 February 1958 (age 68) Ghana
- Party: New Patriotic Party
- Children: 3
- Education: Achimota School
- Profession: ICT specialist

Daniel Kwaku Botwe (born February 26, 1958) is a Ghanaian politician. He was the Member of Parliament of Okere constituency in the Eastern Region of Ghana. He served as Minister for Information and National Orientation in the John Agyekum Kufour administration and also served as the Minister for Regional Reorganization and Development and the Minister for Local Government, Decentralisation and Rural Development in the Nana Akufo-Addo first and second term of office respectively.

== Early life and education ==
Dan Kwaku Botwe was born on February 26, 1958, in Abiriw-Akuapem, located in the Eastern Region of Ghana. He hails from Abiriw Akuapem He was enrolled at the Presbyterian Primary and Middle Schools at Mabang in the Ahafo-Ano District of the Ashanti Region for his basic education. He obtained his GCE Ordinary level certificate at Kumasi Academy and his GCE Advanced level certificate in 1977 from Achimota School. He gained admission into the Kwame Nkrumah University of Science and Technology to pursue a Bachelor of Science degree in computer science.

== Working life ==
In 1985, Dan Botwe was employed by the Ghana Cocobod as a computer analyst. He worked there until 1993 when he entered private business. He was appointed director of Danmaud Limited, a private company in Accra.

== Political life ==
While at KNUST, he was elected as the national secretary of the National Union of Ghana Students (NUGS) from 1982 to 1983. His election coincided with the beginning of the military rule led by the Provisional National Defence Council. His activism and criticism of the ruling elite resulted in him being targeted as a troublemaker. He was sentenced to exile with other Ghanaians to the Ivory Coast. He later returned to Ghana and worked as a computer analyst at the Ghana cocoa board from 1985 to 1993 before moving into a private business.

Botwe contested and won the New Patriotic Party General Secretary election in 1998. He was instrumental in the election of John Kufour as President of Ghana in the 2000 general election. He served in other various capacities in the party, including the National Treasurer of the Youth Wing of the New Patriotic Party, and Director of Operations and Research at the National Headquarters. He has been described by President Akufo-Addo as "a heavy hitter, a political weight", for his achievement in taking the New Patriotic Party out of the opposition and into the government in 2001. Currently, he has been appointed as the National Campaign Chairman for Vice President Alhaji Dr. Mahamadu Bawumia’s campaign team.

=== Member of Parliament ===
Dan Botwe contested the parliamentary election in Okere in 2008 after the incumbent, Brandford Kwame Daniel Adu, had decided to step down as the constituency's parliamentarian. Dan Botwe obtained 11,974 votes out of the 19,684 total votes cast, representing 60.8% of the vote, to become the new member of parliament. He went on to win successive parliamentary elections in 2012, 2016 and 2020.

He was the minority chief whip in the 6th Parliament from 2013 to 2017. As MP he has contributed to the total development of his constituency in several ways. He promised his support for Dreams FC, a Ghana Premier League team that plays their home game at Dawu, a town in his constituency.

=== Flag bearer ambition ===
Dan Botwe contested the 2007 New Patriotic Party primaries for flag bearer. The primaries were organized to find a replacement for John Agyekum Kufour, who had served his full term as the party's flag bearer and President of Ghana. The contest pitched 16 other aspirants against Botwe. The elections took place in Accra on 22 December 2007. Botwe had asserted that the flag bearer position needed a youthful person and should not be considered as a "retirement package" for the aged. He lost the election to Nana Akufo-Addo.

=== Minister of Information ===
From 2006 to 2007 Dan Botwe served as the Minister for Information (Ghana) in the John Agyekum Kufour administration. He succeeded Kwamina Bartels.

=== Minister for Regional Reorganisation ===
In January 2017, President Akufo-Addo named Dan Botwe as the Minister for the newly created Ministry of Regional Reorganization and Development. Akufo-Addo created the ministry to oversee the division of several regions in the country in fulfillment of one of his political promises. The Volta region will be redrawn to create the Oti region, and the Western Region (Ghana) will be redrawn to create the Western-North Region.

=== Cabinet minister ===
In May 2017, President Nana Akufo-Addo named Dan Botwe as one of 19 ministers who would form his cabinet. The names of the 19 ministers were submitted to the Parliament of Ghana and announced by the Speaker of the House, Rt. Hon. Prof. Mike Ocquaye. As a Cabinet minister, Dan Botwe is part of the inner circle of the president and will aid in key decision-making activities in the country.

== Personal life ==
Dan Kwaku Botwe is married with three children. He is a Christian with the Presbyterian denomination.
