= National Anti-Illegal Mining Operations Secretariat =

Anti-illegal Minning Unit

National Anti-Illegal Mining Operations Secretariat (NAIMOS) is a special-purpose unit established to fight illegal minning also known as Galamsey.The unit was established by Hon. Emmanuel Armah-Kofi Buah under the Ministry of Lands and Natural Resources.

== Activities ==
The unit came at a time where illegal mining activities was at it height in Ghana leading to the destruction of the forest, water bodies, livelihood and causing health hazards to communities where these illegal activities takes place, with cordinated support from various security service like the Ghana Police, Military and other security services support the activities of NAIMOS.
