= Cabinet of Ghana =

Executive of the government of Ghana

The Cabinet of Ghana is a key part of the Executive Branch of the Government of Ghana. The Cabinet members are appointed by the President and report to the President. The Cabinet is constituted in conformity with Article 76 (1) of the 1992 Constitution of Ghana. The Constitution enjoins the President to have a Cabinet of no fewer than 10 and not more than 19 ministers.

== Current cabinet ==
Portrait	Portfolio	Incumbent	Term
	Ministry of Finance and Economic Planning (Ghana)	Cassiel Ato Forson	2025 -
	Ministry of Interior (Ghana)	Mubarak Mohammed Muntaka	2025 -
	Ministry of Health (Ghana)	Kwabena Mintah Akandoh	2025 -
	Ministry of Defence (Ghana)	Edward Omane Boamah	2025 -
	Office of Attorney General and Ministry of Justice	Dominic Akuritinga Ayine	2025 -
	Ministry of Energy	John Abdulai Jinapor	2025 -
	Ministry of Education	Haruna Iddrisu	2025 -
	Ministry of Trade and Industry|Ministry of Trade, Agribusiness and Industry	Elizabeth Ofosu-Adjare	2025 -
	Ministry of Lands and Natural Resources	Emmanuel Armah Kofi Buah	2025 -
	Ministry of Foreign Affairs	Samuel Okudzeto Ablakwa	2025 -
	Ministry of Food and Agriculture	Eric Opoku	2025 -
	Ministry of Communication, Digital Technology an Innovations	Sam Nartey George	2025 -
	Ministry of Roads and Highways	Kwame Governs Agbodza	2025 -
	Ministry of Environment, Science, Technology and Innovation	Ibrahim Murtala Muhammed	2025 -
	Ministry of Works, housing and Water Resources	Kenneth Gilbert Adjei	2025 -
	Ministry of local Government, Chieftaincy and Religious Affairs	Ahmed Ibrahim	2025 -
	Ministry of Women and Children's Affairs	Agnes Naa Momo Lartey	2025 -
	Ministry of Transport	Joseph Bukari	2025 -
	Ministry of Employment and Labour Relations	Abdul-Rashid Pelpuo	2025 -

== See also ==
- Politics of Ghana
