= Daniel Nana Addo-Kenneth =

Ghanaian politician and educator

Member of Parliament for Okere (Ghana parliament constituency)
- Incumbent
- Assumed office January 7, 2025
- Preceded by: Dan Botwe

Personal details
- Born: May 11, 1985 (age 41) Awukugua Ghana
- Party: New Patriotic Party
- Education: Nifa Senior High School; University of Ghana; Presbyterian University College
- Occupation: Teacher, Politician

Daniel Nana Addo-Kenneth (born May 11, 1985) is a teacher, Ghanaian New Patriotic Party politician and Member of Parliament for Okere (Ghana parliament constituency) in the ninth parliament of the Fourth Republic of Ghana.

He was the District Chief Executive officer for the Okere District between 2016 and 2024 before winning the parliamentary elections.

== Early life and education ==
Addo-Kenneth was born in Awukugua in the Eastern Region (Ghana) of Ghana. He had his secondary school education at the Nifa Senior High School in Adukrom. He later went to the University of Ghana, where he obtained a Bachelor of Arts. He further proceeded to the Presbyterian University College for his Master of Arts degree. He worked as a teacher with the Ghana Education Service.

== Politics ==
In September 2021, Addo-Kenneth was confirmed as the District Chief Executive officer of the Okere District after his nomination by the then president Nana Akufo-Addo.

In 2023, he filed his nomination to contest for the parliamentary candidacy to represent the New Patriotic Party in the Okere (Ghana parliament constituency) during the 2024 Ghanaian general election.

In January 2024, he won the New Patriotic Party's parliamentary primaries to become the party's candidate going into the 2024 General Elections.

He subsequently won the 2024 Ghanaian general election parliamentary seat for the New Patriotic Party in the Okere (Ghana parliament constituency), beating the candidate of the National Democratic Congress (Ghana), Prince Henry Akim-Owiredu. He polled 19,080 votes representing 68.43%, while his opponent 8,803 representing 31.37%.
