= Freddie Blay =

Ghanaian politician

Hon. Freddie Blay

Member of Parliament for Ellembelle
- In office 1997–2008
- Preceded by: John Aitpillah
- Succeeded by: Emmanuel Armah Kofi Buah

Personal details
- Born: Frederick Worsemao Armah Blay; 1951 (age 74–75) Nzema
- Party: New Patriotic Party
- Children: 3
- Education: Adisadel College; University of Ghana
- Profession: Barrister

Frederick Worsemao Armah Blay is a Ghanaian lawyer and a politician who served as a member of the Second, Third and Fourth Parliament of the Fourth Republic of Ghana, representing the Ellembelle Constituency in the Western Region. He was National Chairman of the New Patriotic Party.

== Education and career ==
Blay attended Adisadel College, the University of Ghana (Bachelor of Law, LLB) and the Ghana School of Law. He is Barrister at law and a member of the Ghana Bar Association. He has been the Senior Partner at Blay and Associates since 1987. Blay was appointed to the position of board chairman for the Ghana National Petroleum Corporation (GNPC). In 2021, his appointment was renewed by Nana Akufo-Addo. He is also the board chairman and majority shareholder of Western Publications Limited, publishers of the Daily Guide newspaper, the flagship of the Group, Business Guide, News-One and Young Blazers.

== Politics ==
Blay was a Member of Parliament in Ghana and served as the First Deputy Speaker in the Fourth Parliament of Ghana. He lost his seat in the general elections held on 7 December 2008 to Armah Kofi Buah of the NDC. He was a member of the Convention People's Party (CPP), but resigned to join the New Patriotic Party (NPP) after being criticized by some CPP stalwarts for not campaigning for the CPP flagbearer Paa Kwesi Nduom, instead endorsing NPP presidential candidate Nana Akufo-Addo.

After joining the NPP, he stood for and got elected to the post of Vice Chairman of the party in April 2014. After the party expelled its Chairman Paul Afoko, it appointed Blay as its acting chairman. He stood for and was elected as substantive Chairman of the party at an NPP party national conference in Koforidua that took place from 7 to 8 July 2018. He served in this position until he was succeeded by Stephen Ntim in 2022.

In the prelude to the Chairmanship race, lots of controversies were generated when Blay promised and eventually bought 275 buses for the 275 constituencies of the party for a purported cost of 11 million dollars. The opposition asked for an investigation. Blay's opponent in the election called it vote-buying. Blay stated that the buses were bought with a loan facility from the Universal Merchant Bank to be run by State Transport Company on the behalf of the NPP's constituencies.

=== 1996, 2000 and 2004 elections ===
Blay was elected as a member of parliament for the Ellembele constituency in the Western region of Ghana in 1996, 2000, and 2004 Ghanaian general elections. He thus represented the constituency in the 2nd, 3rd and 4th parliaments of the 4th republic of Ghana. He stood on the ticket of the Convention Peoples' Party, who then had a political marriage with New patriotic Party (NPP), and as such did not field an NPP candidate in the Ellembele Constituency. In Parliament in 1996, the minority headed by the NPP, chose him as the Second Deputy Speaker, while NDC's Ken Dzirasah was the First.

When the NPP won the 2000 elections, Blay became the First Deputy Speaker, with Dzirasah as the Second. In 2004, the NDC put up Ala Adjetey, the previous speaker for the same position, against the majority NPP's Ebenezer Sekyi-Hughs. This cost Dzirasah and the NDC the Second Deputy Speaker position, which went to NPP's Alhaji Alhassan.

He was first elected in 1996 with 11,674 votes out of the 25,099 valid votes cast representing 30.20% over his opponents Constance Nyamikey-Quaicoe an NDC member who polled 11,663 votes and Abdul Karim Pennah a PNC member who polled 1,762 votes.

He polled 13,722 votes out of the 24,127 valid votes cast representing 56.90%, Kaku Korsah an NDC member who polled 9,554 votes representing 39.60%, Frank Acquah Adamu an NRP member who polled 630 votes representing 2.60% and Abdul Karim Pennah a PNC member who polled 221 votes representing 2.60%.

Blay was elected in 2004 with 18,428 votes out of 34,969 total valid votes cast. This was equivalent to 52.7% of the total valid votes cast. He was elected over Shaibu Chie Issaka of the People's National Convention, Kaku Korsah of the National Democratic Congress and Kyiamah Kaku an independent candidate. These obtained 388 votes, 11,322 votes and 902 votes respectively out of the total valid votes cast. Blay was elected on the ticket of the Convention People's Party.

Parliament of Ghana
Preceded by ?	Member of Parliament for Ellembelle; 1997 – 2008	Succeeded by Emmanuel Armah Kofi Buah
Political offices
Preceded by ?	Second Deputy Speaker of Parliament; 1997 – 2001	Succeeded by Kenneth Dzirasah
Preceded by Kenneth Dzirasah	First Deputy Speaker of Parliament; 2001 – 2008	Succeeded by Edward Doe Adjaho
