= Presidency of John Mahama =

Presidency of John Mahama may refer to:

- First presidency of John Mahama, the Ghanaian presidential administration from 2012 to 2017
- Second presidency of John Mahama, the Ghanaian presidential administration since 2025
