= Austin Akufo Gamey =

Ghanaian politician

Hon. Austin Akufo Gamey

Deputy Minister for Employment and Labor Relations
- In office 1992–1996
- President: Jerry John Rawlings
- President: Jerry John Rawlings

Member of Parliament for North Tongu constituency
- In office 7 January 1993 – 6 January 2001
- Preceded by: Jonathan K. Dowokpor
- Succeeded by: Joe Gidisu

Personal details
- Born: 26 October 1949 (age 76) Volo North Tongu constituency
- Party: National Democratic Congress
- Spouse: Gladys Gamey
- Children: 7
- Education: Fourah Bay College
- Profession: Mediator

Austin Akufo Gamey (born 26 October 1949) is a Ghanaian politician and labor dispute resolution expert and consultant. He served for two terms as member of parliament for North Tongu constituency in the Volta region of Ghana, from 1992 to 2001. During the Jerry John Rawlings administration he was appointed deputy minister for employment and social welfare now ministry of employment and labor relations. He is a labor expert and Alternative Dispute Resolution (ADR) practitioner in Ghana.

== Early life and education ==
Gamey was born on 26 October 1949, in Volo, a community in the Salem hood of North Tongu a locality in the Volta region of Ghana. He was born to the late Emmanuel T.T. Avorvuttor and the late Madam Lucia Aya Avorvuttor who were a farmer and petty trader respectively. Austin Gamey was christened Augustine Akufo Gameduabao which was later shortened to Austin Akufo Gamey. Gamey was fondly called Akufo growing up in his community. He is the fifth child of his parents.

He started his early education at Evangelical Presbyterian primary school then he continued at the Local Authority middle school in volo community in North Tongu. His middle school leaving certificate was cancelled by the West African Examination Council (WAEC). After the cancellation of his results, Gamey relocated to Ashaiman a suburb in the Greater Accra region in 1967, later in 1968 he moved to Tema. He was engaged in sports which helped him gain admission at Akodzo middle School in Tema with the help of his former Headmaster Mr McCarthy.

In 1968, Gamey passed his middle School leaving certificate exam. While at Akodzo due to his athletic abilities he was referred to as "Akodzo Miler."

From 1970 to 1971, He moved to Adabraka a town in the Greater Accra where he engaged in part-time jobs to pay for his fees at Accra Polytechnic now Accra Technical University. In 1976, He studied Advanced Industrial Relations at Fourah Bay College in Sierra Leone.

He studied Industrial relations and labor standards at the Institute of labor studies, in Geneva and Turin Center. From 1997 to 1998 He studied International labor relations and conflict resolution at various institutions and universities in the United States of America and Canada. He also had training in Mediation and interest based negotiation with FMCS in Washington. Later, in 1996, he obtained a certificate in Preventive and Professional Coaching in Mediation from Mediation Training Institute International in Kansas city United States of America.

From 1997 to 1999 he studied labor management at the Japan Institute of Labor in Japan.

== Career ==
He was the industrial relations officer of maritime and dockworkers union, Tema, from 1985 to 1986. From 1987 to 1992, he worked as executive manager, industrial relations and communications, Mankoadze Fisheries, Tema.

He was the president of the Institute of Human Resource and Management Practitioners, Ghana from 1998 to 2003. From 2004 to 2006, he was once Presidential Commissioner on pensions.

In 2002 he set up the Gamey and Gamey Academy of Mediation and he is also the chief executive officer. The company is made up of Alternative Dispute Resolution consultancy and training firms.

On 24 August 2007, He was appointed as Executive consultant for PULSE Africa Incorporated in Canada.

== Politics ==
In 1992, He was elected as member of parliament for North Tongu. He represented the North Tongu constituency in the First parliament of the Fourth republic of Ghana and Second parliament of the Fourth republic of Ghana. He was elected on 7 January 1997 after he was pronounced winner at the 1996 Ghanaian general elections having defeated Patience Ami Ameku who was an independent candidate and Alexander Avor of the Convention People's Party. He claimed 54.10% of the total valid votes cast which is equivalent to 43,639 votes while his oppositions obtained 24.00% which is equivalent to 19,388 votes and 1.90% which is equivalent to 1,554 votes respectively. served for two terms under the Rawlings government. His term ended on 6 January 2001, He was succeeded by Joe Gidisu.

He was appointed deputy minister of employment and social welfare now Ministry of employment and labor relations from 1995 to 2001. He was chairman for the parliamentary committee on conditions of service for members of parliament from 1993 to1996. Between 1997 and 1999, he was chairman of the committee that drafted the Codified Labor Bill for Ghana.

In 2020, He challenged President Nana Addo Dankwa Akuffo Addos' order that the Auditor general of Daniel Yaw Dumelevo is mandated to take his accumulated leave of 123 days. Of which he had only taken seven days since he assumed office in 2017. According to Gamey the Constitution of Ghana does not permit accumulation of leave. He affirmed: “Section 31 of our law clearly states that you cannot even connive with anybody to forego your leave because the intent here is to even enable people rest before they return to work. There is no excuse whatsoever under our labor practice that somebody can accumulate leave. So with the case of the Auditor General, the reality is that the leave has been forfeited”.

== Personal life ==
He is married to Gladys Gamey who is a retired teacher. He has six children four boys and two girls. He is a Christian and a Pastor at the Token Tabernacle.

== See also ==
- Rawlings government .
