= Central Tongu =

Constituency in Ghana

- constituency for the Parliament of Ghana
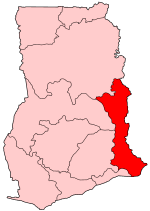
- District: North Tongu District
- Region: Volta Region of Ghana

Current constituency
- Created: Boundaries altered 2004
- Party: National Democratic Congress
- MP: Alexander Roosevelt Hottordze

Central Tongu is one of the constituencies represented in the Parliament of Ghana. It elects one Member of Parliament (MP) by the first past the post system of election. Central Tongu is located in the North Tongu district of the Volta Region of Ghana.

It is made up of three Traditional areas; Bakpa, Mafi and Kpoviedzi. Its capital is Mafi Adidome

== Boundaries ==
The seat is located within the North Tongu District of the Volta Region of Ghana. Before the 2004 December presidential and parliamentary elections, old North Tongu constituency was divided into the current North Tongu and the Central Tongu constituencies.

== Members of Parliament ==
First elected	Member	Party
1956	Ferdinand Goka	Convention People's Party
North Tongu
1992	Austin Akufo Gamey	National Democratic Congress
2000	Joe Gidisu	National Democratic Congress
Central Tongu Boundaries changed in 2004
2004	Joe Gidisu	National Democratic Congress
2016	Alexander Roosevelt Hottordze	National Democratic Congress

== Elections ==
2024 Ghanaian general election: Central Tongu
Party	Candidate	Votes	%	±%
NDC	Alexander Roosevelt Hottordze	25,437	72.05	−11.78
Independent	Dramani Selorm Dzramado	5,344	15.14	—
NPP	Godwin Ayikpa	3,825	10.83	−5.34
NDP	Courage Akafua-Hotor	266	0.75	−0.15
Liberal Party of Ghana	Lawrencia Esenam Avudoahor	64	0.18	—
Majority		20,093	56.91	−10.75
Turnout		35,305	—	—
Registered electors		—		

2020 Ghanaian general election: Central Tongu
Party	Candidate	Votes	%	±%
NDC	Alexander Roosevelt Hottordze	30,818	83.07	−7.19
NPP	Raymond Escambellar Abledu	5,944	16.02	7.59
NDP	Eugene Siabi-Mensah	335	0.9	—
Majority		24,874	67.05	−14.78
Turnout		37,019	87.04	20.18
Registered electors		42,530		

2016 Ghanaian general election: Central Tongu
Party	Candidate	Votes	%	±%
NDC	Alexander Roosevelt Hottordze	25,955	90.26	+5.18
NPP	Ebenezer Kwadzo Azumah	2,423	8.43	−3.84
PPP	Hozame Geoffery	286	0.99	−0.14
CPP	Patrick Kwadwo Agboyibor	93	0.32	−1.2
Majority		23,532	81.83	9.02
Turnout		29,013	66.86	−12.79
Registered electors		43,392		

2012 Ghanaian parliamentary election: Central Tongu Source:GhanaWeb
Party	Candidate	Votes	%	±%
NDC	Joe Kwashie Gidisu	26,127	85.08	+12.48
NPP	Thomas Moore Zonyirah	3,769	12.27	−5.73
CPP	Evans Akpeke	466	1.52	−7.18
PPP	Kabu Mensah John	346	1.13	—
Majority		22,358	72.81	18.21
Turnout		31,258	79.65	8.56
Registered electors		39,242		

2008 Ghanaian parliamentary election: Central Tongu
Party	Candidate	Votes	%	±%
NDC	Joe Kwashie Gidisu	16,598	72.6	3.5
NPP	Thomas Moore Zonyirah	4,110	18.0	10.6
CPP	Mrs Victoria Norgbey Amaglo	1,998	8.7	−14.4
DFP	Emmanuel Kumah Atsem	155	0.7	—
Majority		12,488	54.6	8.6
Turnout		23,278	71.09	—
Registered electors		32,743		

The Central Tongu constituency was carved out of the North Tongu constituency in 2004. This was the first election for the Central Tongu as a stand alone constituency.

2004 Ghanaian parliamentary election:Central Tongu
Party	Candidate	Votes	%	±%
NDC	Joe Kwashie Gidisu	16,807	69.1	−8.0
CPP	Patience Ami Ameku	5,620	23.1	+4.6
NPP	John Cudjo Dunyo	1,793	7.4	+5.0
People's National Convention	Battorvi Brown Cooper	105	0.4	0.0
Majority		11,187	46.0	−12.16
Turnout		25,016	89.2	+23.9
Registered electors		28,047		

2000 Ghanaian parliamentary election:North Tongu
Party	Candidate	Votes	%	±%
NDC	Joe Kwashie Gidisu	42,392	77.1	9.53
CPP	Patience Ami Ameku	10,172	18.5	—
NPP	George Amedofu Kpobi	1,296	2.4	—
National Reform Party	Emmanuel A K Bokor	637	1.2	—
United Ghana Movement	Larweh Atsu J Confucious	251	0.5	—
People's National Convention	Olivia Akua Kpo	204	0.4	—
Majority		32,220	58.6	21.05
Turnout		55,870	65.3	−14.71
Registered electors		85,558		

1996 Ghanaian parliamentary election:North Tongu
Party	Candidate	Votes	%	±%
NDC	Austin Akufo Gamey	43,639	67.57	
Independent	Patience Ami Ameku	19,388	30.02	
People's Convention Party	Alexander Avor	1,554	2.41	
Majority		24,251	37.55	
Turnout		64,581	80.01	—
Registered electors		80,721		

1992 Ghanaian parliamentary election:North Tongu Source:
Party	Candidate	Votes	%	±%
NDC	Austin Akufo Gamey			

== See also ==
- List of Ghana Parliament constituencies
