= Ghana GoldBod =

Ghana Gold Board

Ghana Gold Board
- GoldBod

Agency overview
- Formed: 2025
- Jurisdiction: Government of Ghana
- Headquarters: Accra, Ghana
- Minister responsible: Emmanuel Armah Kofi Buah, Minister for Lands and Natural Resources
- Agency executive: Sammy Gyamfi, CEO
- Parent department: Ministry of Lands and Natural Resources (Ghana)
- Website: goldbod.gov.gh

The Ghana Gold Board (commonly known as GoldBod) (/ˈɡɑːnəɡoʊldbɔːd/) is a government-owned entity established under the GoldBod Act 1140 of Parliament in March 2025. It operates under the Ministry of Lands and Natural Resources and is authorized to buy, assay, sell, and export gold and other minerals produced by licensed artisanal and small-scale miners (ASM) in Ghana.

== History and establishment ==
On 28 March 2025, Parliament passed the GoldBod Bill, which was subsequently signed into law by President John Dramani Mahama. The legislation, introduced by the Ministry of Finance, aimed to restructure the country’s gold sector by establishing GoldBod as a regulatory body with authority over gold trading and export activities involving artisanal and small-scale miners.

During the passage of the bill, Finance Minister, Cassiel Ato Forson described the legislation as "transformative", stating that it aims to regulate the entire gold value chain, from extraction to export.

== Mandate ==
The Ghana Gold Board (GoldBod) was established with a mandate to purchase gold from licensed artisanal and small-scale miners (ASM) in Ghana, with the stated goal of reducing smuggling and improving traceability. According to the 2025 national budget, the Board was allocated a revolving fund of US $279 million to support its operations, including the weekly purchase and export of up to three tones of gold. In addition to trading, GoldBod is tasked with contributing to Ghana’s foreign exchange strategy by supporting gold reserves and facilitating local gold retention. The Board also oversees activities across the gold value chain, such as refining and marketing, and works toward compliance with international standards like those of the London Bullion Market Association (LBMA). In addition to the it mandate to ensure the purchase of legally mind or refine gold, it has a taskforce who monitor and arrest all illegal gold deals in Ghana

== Government Board ==
Sustaining the fully operational of the Ghana Gold Board (GoldBoD), the Minister for Finance on behalf of the President of Ghana John Dramani Mahama in May 2025 inaugurated a 13- board members of the GoldBod tasking them with controlling and supporting of the currency strength and its stability. The members include the following;

1. Hon. Kojo Oppong Nkrumah
2. Mr Sammy Gyamfi - CEO /member
3. Mr. Emmanuel Armah Kofi Bush - MP, Minister for Lands and Natural Resources/ member
4. Thomas Nyarko Ampen - MP, Deputy Finance Minister/ member
5. Johnson Asiamah - Governor of Bank of Ghana/member
6. Mr. Nelson Ahedor - Representative, Minerals Commission/member
7. Christopher Opoku Nyarko - Representative, Chamber of Mines/member
8. Mr. Godwin Nichelson Armah - Representative, Ghana Small Scale Miners Association/Member
9. Mr. Kwaku Effah Asuahene - Representative, Chamber of Bullion Traders/member
10. Mr. Kojo Fynn - Chairperson

== Governance ==
GoldBod is overseen by a board appointed by the Ministry of Lands and Natural Resources and funded through government appropriations and gold purchase revenue.

2026 association https://www.youtube.com/watch?v=jrqndGwez84
