= Sunyani West =

Sunyani West may refer to:

- Sunyani West (Ghana parliament constituency)
- Sunyani West District
