= Alexander R. Hottordze =

Ghanaian politician (born 1969)

Alexander Gabby Hottordze
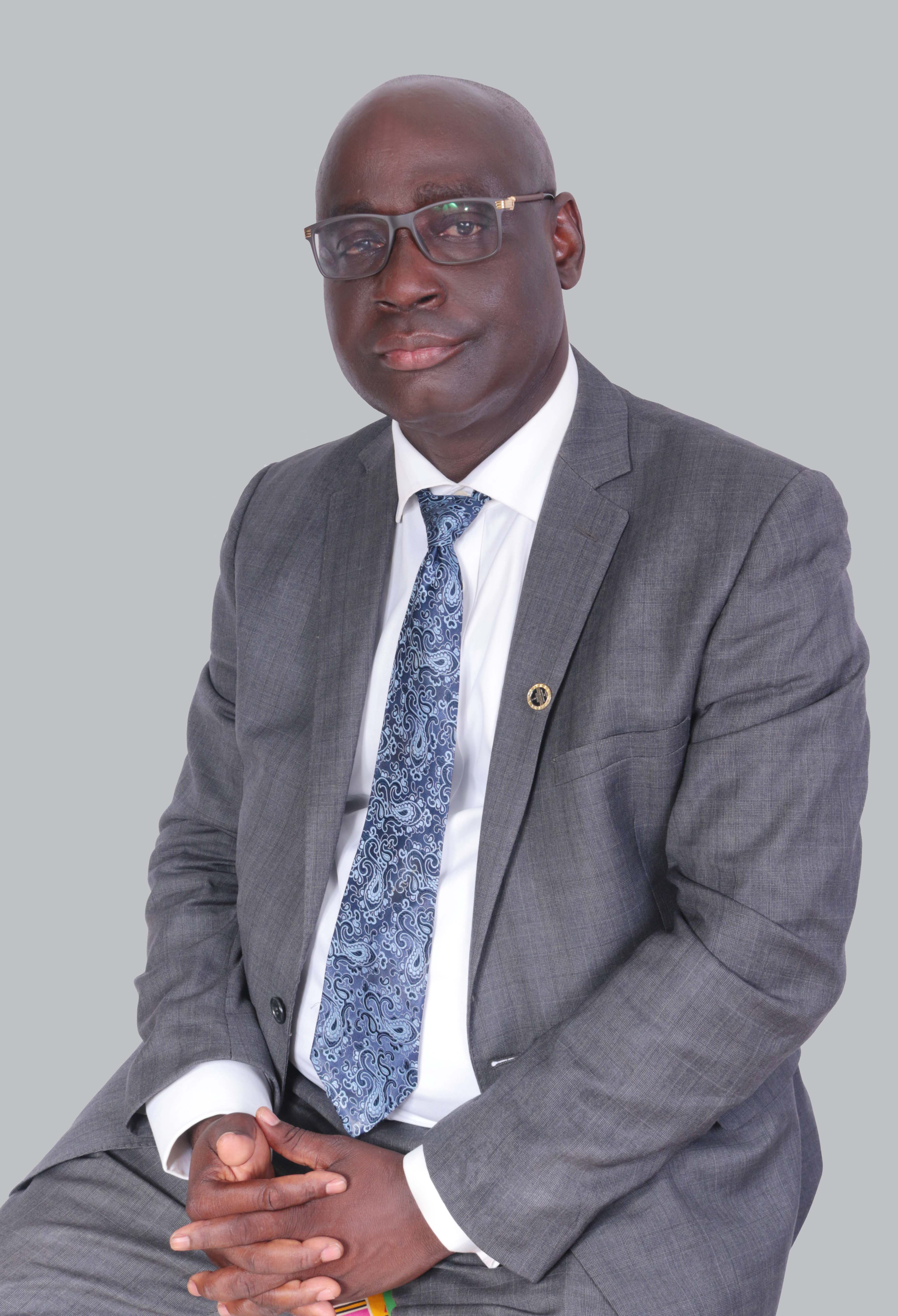

Member of the Ghana Parliament for Central Tongu
- Incumbent
- Assumed office 7 January 2017
- Preceded by: Joe Gidisu
- Majority: 24,874

Personal details
- Born: 9 May 1969 (age 57) Mafi-Kumase, Ghana
- Party: National Democratic Congress
- Education: Mafi kumase senior high technical school
- Occupation: Manager and Administrator

Alexander Roosevelt. Hottordze (born 9 May 1969) is a Ghanaian politician and member of the Seventh Parliament of the Fourth Republic of Ghana representing the Central Tongu Constituency in the Volta Region on the ticket of the National Democratic Congress (NDC).

== Early life and education ==
Born on 9 May 1969, Hottordze hails from Mafi-Kumase. He holds an M.B.A from the Cape Coast University and an M.A from the University of Social Studies.

== Politics ==
Hottordze is a member of the National Democratic Congress and represented the Central Tongu constituency in the Seventh and Eighth Parliament of the Fourth Republic of Ghana.

=== 2016 election ===
Hottordze contested the Central Tongu constituency parliamentary seat on the ticket of the National Democratic Congress during the 2016 Ghanaian general election and Won with 25,955 votes representing 90.26% of the total votes. He was elected over Ebenezer Kwadzo Azumah of the New Patriotic Party who polled 2,423 votes which is equivalent 8. 43%, parliamentary candidate for the PPP Hozame Geoffrey had 286 votes representing 0.99% and parliamentary candidate for the Convention People's Party Patrick Kwadwo Agboyibor had 93 votes representing 0.32% of the total votes.

==== 2020 election ====
Hottordze was re-elected as a member of parliament for Central Tongu(Ghana parliament constituency) in the Volta Region on the ticket of the National Democratic Congress during the 2020 Ghanaian general election. He was elected with 30,818 votes representing 83.07% over Raymond Escambellar Ablebu of the New Patriotic Party who polled 5,944 votes, which is equivalent to 16.02% and the parliamentary candidate for the NDP Eugene Siabi-Mensah had 335 votes representing 0.90% of the total votes.

=== Committees ===
Hottordze is a member of the special budget committee and Health committee.

== Personal life ==
alexander r. hottordze is a Christian.

Parliament of Ghana
Preceded by Joe Gidisu	Member of Parliament for Central Tongu; 2017–present	Incumbent
