= Joseph Gyamfi =

Ghanaian politician

Member of Parliament for Sunyani West constituency
- President: Jerry John Rawlings
- Parliamentary group: National Democratic Congress

Personal details
- Born: 22 January 1954 (age 72)
- Education: University of Ghana
- Occupation: Teacher

Joseph Gyamfi is a Ghanaian politician and member of the first parliament of the fourth republic of Ghana representing Sunyani West Constituency under the membership of the National Democratic Congress.

== Early life and education ==
Joseph was born on 22 January 1954. He attended University of Ghana where he obtained his Bachelor of Arts in political science. He worked as a teacher before going into parliament.

== Politics ==
Joseph began his political career in 1992 when he became the parliamentary candidate for the National Democratic Congress (NDC) to represent his constituency in the Brong-Ahafo region of Ghana prior to the commencement of the 1992 Ghanaian parliamentary election. He was elected into the first parliament of the fourth republic of Ghana on 7 January 1993 after being pronounced winner at the 1992 Ghanaian election held on 29 December 1992. He lost his candidacy to his fellow party comrade Kwadwo Nyamekye-Marfo who lost to Kwadwo Adjei Darko of the New Patriotic Party at the 1996 Ghanaian general elections. Kwadwo Nyamekye-Marfo polled 37.90% of the total valid votes cast which was equivalent to 13,204 votes but his opponent polled 39.50% of the total valid votes cast which was equivalent to 13,737 votes.
