= Sunyani West (Ghana parliament constituency) =

Constituency in the Bono Region of Ghana

- constituency for the Parliament of Ghana
- District: Sunyani West District
- Region: Bono Region of Ghana

Current constituency
- Party: National Democratic Congress
- MP: Millicent Yeboah Amankwah

Sunyani West is one of the constituencies represented in the Parliament of Ghana. It elects one Member of Parliament (MP) by the first past the post system of election.

Millicent Yeboah Amankwaa is the member of parliament for the constituency. She was elected on the ticket of the National Democratic Congress (NDC) won a majority to become the MP. She succeeded Ignatius Baffour Awuah who had also represented the constituency in the 4th Republic parliament.

== Members of Parliament ==
First elected	Member	Party
Sunyani West
1951	Boahene Yeboah-Afari	Convention People's Party
1954	Stephen Willie Yeboah	Convention People's Party
First Republic
1956	Stephen Willie Yeboah	Convention People's Party
Sunyani
1965	Kyere Awua Gyan	Convention People's Party
Second Republic
1969	Joseph Henry Mensah	Progress Party
Third Republic
1979	Kwadwo Owusu-Sekyere	Independent
Fourth Republic
Sunyani West
1992	Joseph Gyamfi	National Democratic Congress
1996	Kwadwo Adjei-Darko	New Patriotic Party
2008	Ignatius Baffour Awuah	New Patriotic Party
2024	Millicent Yeboah Amankwah	National Democratic Congress

== Election results ==
2024 Ghanaian general election: Sunyani West
Party	Candidate	Votes	%	±%
NDC	Millicent Yeboah Amankwah	26,828	57.64	+16.46
NPP	Ignatius Baffour Awuah	19,715	42.36	−5.21
People's National Convention	Matilda Akatu Adongo	128	0.27	+0.01
Majority		7,113	15.28	+8.31
Turnout		47,083	59.26	—
Registered electors		79,455		—

2020 Ghanaian general election: Sunyani West
Party	Candidate	Votes	%	±%
NPP	Ignatius Baffour Awuah	26,907	47.15	−14.76
NDC	Millicent Yeboah Amankwah	23,499	41.18	+3.91
Independent	Bernard Oduro Takyi	6,507	11.40	—
People's National Convention	Matilda Akatu Adongo	150	0.26	−0.01
Majority		3,408	6.97	−17.63
Turnout				—
Registered electors				—

2016 Ghanaian general election: Sunyani West
Party	Candidate	Votes	%	±%
NPP	Ignatius Baffour Awuah	29,215	61.91	+11.83
NDC	Justice Samuel Adjei	17,589	37.27	−11.78
CPP	Baah Fred	255	0.54	—
People's National Convention	Matilda Akatu Adongo	129	0.27	—
Majority		11,626	24.64	+23.61
Turnout		47,672	71.92	—
Registered electors		66,288		—

2012 Ghanaian general election: Sunyani West
Party	Candidate	Votes	%	±%
NPP	Ignatius Baffour Awuah	22,620	50.08	−10.44
NDC	Kwadwo Nyamekye-Marfo	22,153	49.05	+11.06
PPP	Akan Al-Sadat	298	0.66	—
NDP	Charles Antwi-Yeboah	93	0.21	—
Majority		467	1.03	−21.50
Turnout		49,750	84.06	—
Registered electors		59,185		—

2008 Ghanaian general election: Sunyani West
Party	Candidate	Votes	%	±%
NPP	Ignatius Baffour Awuah	22,674	60.52	+7.22
NDC	Kwadwo Nyamekye-Marfo	14,233	37.99	+4.39
CPP	Frederick Kwadwo Antepim	250	0.67	−0.13
People's National Convention	Elizabeth Takyiwaa	189	0.50	—
DFP	Ben Amoah Amponsah	72	0.19	—
DPP	Collins Ansu Yeboah	49	0.13	−0.37
Majority		7,514	19.7	−2.83
Turnout		39,219	71.04	−16.06
Registered electors		55,206		—

2004 Ghanaian general election: Sunyani West
Party	Candidate	Votes	%	±%
NPP	Kwadwo Adjei-Darko	20,350	53.3	+0.1
NDC	Ahmed Boadan	12,836	33.6	−6.2
Independent	Francis Obiri	4,494	11.8	+10.1
CPP	Samuel Gyabaah	302	0.8	−1.5
DPP	King Kingsford Fordjour	206	0.5	—
Majority		8,441	22.53	+9.21
Turnout		38,866	87.1	+22.91
Registered electors		44,632		—

2000 Ghanaian general election: Sunyani West
Party	Candidate	Votes	%	±%
NPP	Kwadwo Adjei-Darko	14,823	53.2	+3.69
NDC	Kwadwo Nyamekye-Marfo	11,111	39.8	−7.79
CPP	Kwaku Twumasi-Ankrah	650	2.3	—
National Reform Party	Monica Kyei-Mensah	578	2.1	—
Independent	Patrick Obeng-Mensah	487	1.7	—
People's National Convention	Wilberforce Nabita Amoah	237	0.8	−2.09
Majority		3,712	13.32	+11.42
Turnout		28,413	64.19	−17.01
Registered electors		44,258		—

1996 Ghanaian general election: Sunyani West
Party	Candidate	Votes	%	±%
NPP	Kwadwo Adjei-Darko	13,737	49.51	—
NDC	Kwadwo Nyamekye-Marfo	13,204	47.59	—
People's National Convention	Sara Obeng Amoako	803	2.89	—
Majority		533	1.92	—
Turnout		28,256	81.20	—
Registered electors		34,798		—

Many parties boycotted the 1992 parliamentary elections claiming that the 1992 Ghanaian presidential election won by Jerry Rawlings of the National Democratic Congress (NDC) and the Progressive Alliance which comprised the NDC, Every Ghanaian Living Everywhere (EGLE) and National Convention Party (NCP) held on 3 November 1992 had been rigged. The boycotting parties were New Patriotic Party (NPP), People's National Convention (PNC), National Independence Party (NIP), and the People's Heritage Party (PHP).

1992 Ghanaian parliamentary election: Sunyani West
Party	Candidate	Votes	%	±%
NDC	Joseph Gyamfi			—
Majority				—
Turnout		7,468	22.66	—
Registered electors		32,953		—

== See also ==
- List of Ghana Parliament constituencies
