= Nifa Senior High School =

Secondary school in Okere, Ghana

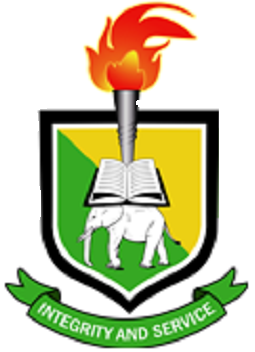
The school's crest

Nifa Senior High School (NISEC) is a category B co-educational second-cycle institution in Adukrom, situated in the Okere District in the Eastern Region of Ghana.

== History ==
A community-based institution, the school was established in 1971 as a product of the phasing out of the then Adukrom Teacher Training College by the Ministry of Education (now Ghana Education Service). The general objective of the change in status was to provide full secondary school education to the growing number of boys and girls, especially those resident around the Okere community who had little chance of receiving secondary level education elsewhere due to shortages of such schools.

== Boarding ==
The school has boarding facilities for both boys and girls. It also has a hostel outside the school for students who could not make it into the boarding house.

The school also has four houses that are students: Gyeke Darko, Air Marshall Otu, Opare Baidoo and Otutu Ababio.

== Religious service ==
The school is a non-denominational institution. There is a complete freedom of worship. Morning assembly and Sunday morning worship must be attended by all irrespective of their religious background.

== Enrollment ==
The school has about 2,500 students enrolled in Business, Science, general arts, general agric, Home Economics and visual arts courses

== Facilities ==
- 3 Science Laboratories ( Physics, Biology and Chemistry)
- I.C.T Lab
- Library
- Home Economics Lab
- Visual Arts Center
- School Farm
- Sports (standard field for soccer and athletics, basketball court, volley and handball court)
- School Clinic
- Barbering shop
- Assembly hall

== Courses ==
- Business
- Agriculture
- Home Economics
- General Science
- General Arts
- Visual Arts

== See also ==
- Education in Ghana
- List of senior high schools in Ghana
