= North Tongu (Ghana parliament constituency) =

Constituency in Ghana

- constituency for the Parliament of Ghana
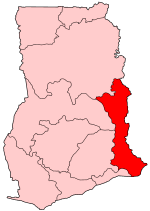
- District: North Tongu District
- Region: Volta Region of Ghana

Current constituency
- Party: National Democratic Congress
- MP: Samuel Okudzeto Ablakwa

North Tongu is one of the constituencies represented in the Parliament of Ghana. It elects one Member of Parliament (MP) by the first past the post system of election. North Tongu is located in the North Tongu district of the Volta Region of Ghana.

== Boundaries ==
The seat is located within the North Tongu District of the Volta Region of Ghana. It was formed before the 2004 December presidential and parliamentary elections by the division of the old North Tongu constituency into the new North Tongu and Central Tongu constituencies. The boundaries of the present constituency thus differs from the North Tongu constituency of elections prior to 2004.

== Members of Parliament ==
First elected	Member	Party
1992	Austin Akufo Gamey	National Democratic Congress
2000	Joe Gidisu	National Democratic Congress
Border changes effected in 2004
2004	Charles Sename Hodogbey	National Democratic Congress
2012	Samuel Okudzeto Ablakwa	National Democratic Congress

== Elections ==
2024 Ghanaian general election: North Tongu
Party	Candidate	Votes	%	±%
NDC	Samuel Okudzeto Ablakwa	41,073	93.12	+3.41
NPP	John Saviour Yaw Eleblu	3,035	6.88	−2.41
Majority		38,038	86.24	+5.74
Turnout		44,383	66.0	—
Registered electors		67,220		

2020 Ghanaian general election: North Tongu
Party	Candidate	Votes	%	±%
NDC	Samuel Okudzeto Ablakwa	42,011	89.71	+14.22
NPP	Richard Collins Arku	4,312	9.21	+6.12
Ghana Union Movement	Akaho Raymond	505	1.08	—
Majority		37,699	80.50	+25.97
Turnout		—	—	—
Registered electors		—		

2016 Ghanaian general election: North Tongu
Party	Candidate	Votes	%	±%
NDC	Samuel Okudzeto Ablakwa	26,560	75.49	−14.96
Independent	Christopher Kofi Eleblu ¨	7,376	20.96	—
NPP	Arku Richard Collins	1,086	3.09	−3.74
PPP	Kudjordzi A. K. Prosper	66	0.19	—
CPP	Morti-Dzivor Albert Mawuena	52	0.15	−0.21
NDP	Gordon Bedzra-Gamey	45	0.13	−0.62
Majority		19,184	54.53	−29.09
Turnout		35,696	65.7	−11.6
Registered electors		54,338		

2012 Ghanaian general election: North Tongu
Party	Candidate	Votes	%	±%
NDC	Samuel Okudzeto Ablakwa	33,422	90.45	
NPP	Nicholas Ahiadorme	2,522	6.83	—
United Renaissance Party	David K. Amansunu	350	0.95	—
NDP	Gordon Bedzra-Gamey	276	0.75	—
People's National Convention	Agbodza Peter Nash	245	0.66	—
CPP	Medegli Emmanuel Tse	134	0.36	—
Majority		30,900	83.62	—
Turnout		37,532	77.3	—
Registered electors		48,577		

2008 Ghanaian parliamentary election: North Tongu
Party	Candidate	Votes	%	±%
NDC	Charles Sename Hodugbey	22,876	78.6	7.1
NPP	Moses Mensah Assem	4,065	14.0	7.1
CPP	Emmanuel Yaovi Bobobee	2,042	7.0	—
DFP	Eunice Mordey	133	0.5	—
Majority		18,811	64.6	14.6
Turnout		29,485	71.3	—
Registered electors		41,352		

2004 Ghanaian parliamentary election:North Tongu
Party	Candidate	Votes	%	±%
NDC	Charles Sename Hodogbey	21,857	71.5	−6.6
Independent	Cosmos Kodjo Etse Asem	6,465	21.1	N/A
NPP	Nicholas M. K. Ahiadorme	2,104	6.9	4.5
People's National Convention	David Kwasi Amansunu	151	0.5	0.1
Majority		15,392	50.4	N/A
Turnout		31,034	88.6	—
Registered electors		35,042		

2000 Ghanaian parliamentary election:North Tongu
Party	Candidate	Votes	%	±%
NDC	Joe Kwashie Gidisu	42,392	77.1	9.53
CPP	Patience Ami Ameku	10,172	18.5	—
NPP	George Amedofu Kpobi	1,296	2.4	—
National Reform Party	Emmanuel A K Bokor	637	1.2	—
United Ghana Movement	Larweh Atsu J Confucious	251	0.5	—
People's National Convention	Olivia Akua Kpo	204	0.4	—
Majority		32,220	58.6	21.05
Turnout		55,870	65.3	−14.71
Registered electors		85,558		

1996 Ghanaian parliamentary election:North Tongu
Party	Candidate	Votes	%	±%
NDC	Austin Akufo Gamey	43,639	67.57	
Independent	Patience Ami Ameku	19,388	30.02	
People's Convention Party	Alexander Avor	1,554	2.41	
Majority		24,251	37.55	
Turnout		64,581	80.01	—
Registered electors		80,721		

1992 Ghanaian parliamentary election:North Tongu Source:Electoral Commission of Ghana
Party	Candidate	Votes	%	±%
NDC	Austin Akufo Gamey			
Majority				
Turnout		40,045	61.3	—

== See also ==
- List of Ghana Parliament constituencies
