= John Aitpillah =

Ghanaian politician

William Kwaku Asante

MP for Ellembelle
- In office 7 January 1993 – 6 January 1997
- President: Jerry John Rawlings

Personal details
- Born: John Aitpillah Ellembelle, Western Region, Gold Coast (now Ghana)
- Party: National Democratic Congress
- Occupation: Politician

John Aitpillah is a Ghanaian politician and a member of the first Parliament of the fourth Republic representing the Ellembelle Constituency in the Western Region of Ghana.

== Early life ==
William Kwaku Asante was born in Ellembelle in the Western region of Ghana.

== Politics ==
He was first elected into Parliament on the ticket of the National Democratic Congress for the Ellembelle constituency during the 1992 Ghanaian general elections.

== Career ==
He is a former member of Parliament for the Ellembelle constituency from 1993 to 1997. He served only one term as the member of Parliament for the constituency. He was also a district chief executive and a teacher in Axim.

== Personal life and death. ==
He is a Christian. Aitpillah died at age 81 on September 21, 2005.
