= Millicent Yeboah Amankwah =

Ghanaian politician

Hon. Millicent Yeboah Amankwah MP

Member of Parliament for Sunyani West
- Incumbent
- Assumed office 7 January 2025
- Preceded by: Ignatius Baffour Awuah

Personal details
- Born: July 22, 1992 (age 34)
- Party: National Democratic Congress
- Spouse: Mahama Ayariga
- Education: Notre Dame High School (Ghana); Kwame Nkrumah University of Science and Technology; University of Law

Millicent Yeboah Amankwah (born July 22, 1992) is a Ghanaian politician and is a member of the National Democratic Congress (NDC). She is currently the member of parliament for the Sunyani West constituency. She represents the constituency in the Ninth Parliament of the Fourth Republic of Ghana. She is married to Hon. Mahama Ayariga, Bawku Central Member of Parliament.

== Early life and education ==
Millicent hails from Odumase-Sunyani in the Bono Region of Ghana. She attended Notre Dame High School (Ghana). She earned a Bachelor of Arts degree from the Kwame Nkrumah University of Science and Technology in 2016 and a Graduate Diploma in Law from the University of Law in 2022.

== Politics ==
In August 2019, she stood for the National Democratic Congress primaries for Sunyani West. Amankwah defeated Justice Samuel Adjei and Abdullai Yah garnering 623 votes against 171 and 286 votes.

In the 2024 General Elections, Amankwaah run for the Sunyani West Constituency seat on the ticket of the against the then incumbent MP, Ignatius Baffour Awuah of the New Patriotic Party. She polled 26,828 votes representing 57.64% defeating her opponent who obtained 19,715 votes representing 42.36% of the total votes cast.
