= Brandford Daniel Adu =

Ghanaian politician

Hon. Brandford Daniel Adu

Member of Parliament for Okere Constituency
- In office 7 January 2005 – 6 January 2009
- President: John Kufuor

Member of Parliament for Okere Constituency
- In office 7 January 2001 – 6 January 2005
- President: John Kufuor

Personal details
- Born: Brandford Kwame Daniel Adu; 2 June 1942 (age 84)
- Party: New Patriotic Party
- Education: Ghana Institute of Management and Public Administration
- Profession: Business executive

Brandford Kwame Daniel Adu (born 2 June 1942) is a Ghanaian businessman, politician, and Member of Parliament of the third and fourth parliaments of the Fourth Republic of Ghana, representing the Okere Constituency in the Eastern Region of Ghana.

== Early life and education ==
Adu was born on 2 June 1942. He attended the Ghana Institute of Management and Public Administration, GIMPA and obtained his Diploma in Paint Technology.

== Politics ==
Adu is a member of the New Patriotic Party. He served as a member of parliament in the 3rd and fourth parliaments of the 4th republic of Ghana for the Okere constituency in the Eastern region of Ghana. He took over from Fuzzy Dapaah Torbay of the major opposition party, the National Democratic Congress, after the dissolution of the 2nd parliament of the 4th republic of Ghana. He was however oust after his second term as the member of parliament for the same constituency by another representative of the New Patriotic Party, Daniel Botwe.

=== 2000 Elections ===
Adu was elected as the member of parliament for the Okere constituency in the 2000 Ghanaian general elections. He was elected on the ticket of the New Patriotic Party. His constituency was a part of the 18 parliamentary seats out of 26 seats won by the New Patriotic Party in that election for the Eastern Region. The New Patriotic Party won a majority total of 100 parliamentary seats out of 200 seats in the 3rd parliament of the 4th republic of Ghana. He was elected with 7,322 votes equivalent to 47.30%. He was elected over Fuzzy Dapaah Torbay of the National Democratic Congress, Seth Otibu Mpare of the Convention People's Party, David Opare of the National Reform Party and Simson Samuel Duodu of the People's National Convention. These obtained 7,313, 508, 264 and 77 votes respectively out of the total valid votes cast. These were equivalent to 47.20%, 3.30%,1.70% and 0.50% respectively of total valid votes cast.

=== 2004 elections ===
Adu was elected into Parliament on the ticket of the New Patriotic Party during the December 2004 Ghanaian General elections for the Okere Constituency in the Eastern Region of Ghana. He obtained 10,902 votes out of the 18,412 valid votes cast representing 59.20%. He was elected over Gloria Adu Nartey of the National Democratic Congress and Akoto Kwasi of the Convention People's Party.

These obtained 6,867 votes and 643 votes respectively of the total valid votes cast. These were equivalent to 37.3% and 3.5% respectively of the total valid votes cast. His constituency was a part of the 22 constituencies won by the New Patriotic Party in the Eastern region in that elections.

In all, the New Patriotic Party won a total 128 parliamentary seats in the 4th parliament of the 4th republic of Ghana.

== Personal life ==
Adu is a Christian.
