= Mabang =

Coordinates: 7°00′N 2°13′W

Mabang is a town in the Ahafo-Ano District of the Ashanti Region of Ghana.
