= Kwadwo Adjei-Darko =

Ghanaian politician

Hon. Kwadwo Adjei Darko

Member of Parliament for Sunyani West Constituency
- In office 7 January 1997 – 6 January 2001
- President: Jerry John Rawlings

Member of Parliament for Sunyani West Constituency
- In office 7 January 2001 – 6 January 2005
- President: John Kufuor

Member of Parliament for Sunyani West Constituency
- In office 7 January 2005 – 6 January 2009
- President: John Kufuor

Personal details
- Born: 10 May 1948 (age 78)
- Party: New Patriotic Party
- Education: University of Cape Coast
- Profession: Artist

Kwadwo Adjei Darko is a Ghanaian politician. He was the Member of parliament for the Sunyani West constituency in the Brong Ahafo Region of Ghana.

== Early life and education ==
Adjei Darko was born on 10 May 1948. He obtained a Bachelor of Science degree at the University of Cape Coast. He majored in education.

== Career ==
Adjei Darko is an artist by profession.

== Political career ==
Adjei-Darko was the Member of Parliament for the Sunyani West constituency in the 3rd and 4th parliaments of the 4th republic of Ghana. He was the former Minister of Mines back in the early 2000s, and as of 2008, he was the Minister of Local Government, Rural Development and Environment of Ghana and a Member of Parliament for the Sunyani West Constituency. He has done much work to facilitate rural development in Ghana, particularly with the mining of salt and diamonds. However, as of May 2009, Adjei-Darko is believed to no longer be a minister. He played a major role in the women's ministry too by arranging cars for young women who were entering the work force. He even used his own money to purchase cars for them.

=== 2000 Elections ===
Adjei-Darko was first elected at the Member of parliament in the 2000 Ghanaian General elections. He therefore represented the Sunyani West constituency in the 3rd parliament of the 4th republic of Ghana. He e was elected with 14,823votes out of 27,886 total valid votes cast. This was equivalent to 53.2% total valid votes cast. He was elected over Kwadwo Nyamekye-Marfo of the National Democratic Congress, Kwaku Twumasi-Ankrah of the Convention People's Party, Kyei-Mensah Monica of the National Reform Party, Patrick Obeng-Mensah an independent candidate and Wilberforce Nabita Amoah of People's National Convention. These obtained 11,111votes, 650votes, 578votes, 487votes and 237votes respectively of the total valid votes cast. These were equivalent to 39.8%, 2.3%, 2.1%, 1.7% and 0.8% respectively of all total valid votes cast. Adjei-Darko was elected on the ticket of the New Patriotic Party. His constituency was a part of 14 parliamentary seats out of a total 21 seats won by the New Patriotic Party in that elections in the Brong Ahafo Region of Ghana. In all, the New Patriotic Party won a majority total of 100 parliamentary representation out of 200parliamentary seats in the 3rd parliament of the 4th republic of Ghana.

=== 2004 Elections ===
Adjei-Darko was, re-elected as the Member of Parliament for the Sunyani West constituency in the 2008 Ghanaian general elections. He thus re-represented the constituency in the 4th parliament of the 4th republic of Ghana. He was elected with 20,350votes out of 38,188total valid votes cast. This was equivalent to 53.3% of total valid votes cast. He was elected over Ahmed Boadan of the National Democratic Party, Gyabah Samuel of the Convention People's Party, King Kingsford Fordjour of the Democratic People's Party, Obiri Francis an independent candidate. These obtained 12,836 votes, 302 votes, 206 votes and 4,494 votes respectively out of the total valid votes cast. These were equivalent to 33.6%, 0.8%, 0.5% and 11.8% respectively of the total valid votes cast. Adjei-Darko was re-elected on the ticket of the New Patriotic Party. His constituency was a part of 14 parliamentary seats out of a total 24 seats won by the New Patriotic Party in the Brong Ahafo region of Ghana in that elections. In all, the New Patriotic Party won a majority total of 114 parliamentary representation out of a total 230 seats in the 4th parliament of the 4th republic of Ghana.

== Personal life ==
Adjei Darko is a Christian. Adjei Darko has three daughters.
