= Ministry of Regional Reorganization and Development =

Government ministry of Ghana

The Ministry of Regional Re-organisation is Government of Ghana ministry charged with the responsibility of supervising the creation of new regions in Ghana. The ministry is headed by Hon. Dan Botwe. It was created in January 2017 by President Akufo-Addo.

== New Regions ==
President Akufo-Addo promised to split the Volta region into two separated regions namely the Volta Region in the South and the Oti Region in the North. The Western Region was also to be split into the Western and Western-north regions. The Northern Region was to be split into North East, Savannah and the Northern regions. The Brong Ahafo Region was also to be split into three sections, namely Bono, Bono East and Ahafo Region respectively.
