= Second presidency of John Mahama =

Ghanaian presidency since 2025

- Second presidency of John Mahama; 7 January 2025 – present
- President: John Mahama
- Cabinet: Cabinet of John Mahama
- Party: National Democratic Congress
- Election: 2024
- Seat: Jubilee House
- Seal of the President

The second and current tenure of John Mahama as the president of Ghana began on 7 January 2025, when he was inaugurated as the 14th president. Mahama, who previously served as president from 2012 to 2017, was elected for a full second term in the 2024 Ghanaian general election. Following his victory, Mahama became the first president in Ghanaian history to be democratically elected to a non-consecutive second term. He will be ineligible for reelection in 2028; the constitution limits the president to two terms, even if they are non-consecutive.

== Background ==
=== First presidency ===
John Mahama became the 12th president of Ghana when he succeeded John Atta Mills following the latter's death in office on 24 July 2012. Mahama previously served as Vice-President of Ghana from January 2009 to July 2012, and was the first head of state of Ghana to have been born after the country's independence. In December 2012, he was elected for a full term as president.

Upon assuming office, Mahama continued the Better Ghana Agenda policy vision initiated by his predecessor. He contested re-election for a second term in the 2016 election, but lost to the New Patriotic Party candidate Nana Akufo-Addo.

=== 2024 Ghanaian general election ===
After unsuccessfully contesting the 2020 election, Mahama ran as the candidate of his National Democratic Congress (NDC) in the 2024 election for a second non-consecutive term as president by obtaining 56.55% of the valid votes, defeating the ruling New Patriotic Party (NPP) candidate and incumbent vice-president Mahamudu Bawumia. Bawumia conceded defeat the morning after the election.

== Inauguration ==
Mahama was inaugurated on 7 January 2025 at the Black Star Square in Accra.
