= Ellembelle (Ghana parliament constituency) =

Constituency in Ghana

- constituency for the Parliament of Ghana
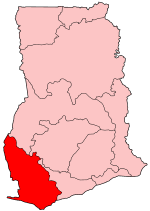
- District: Ellembelle District
- Region: Western Region of Ghana

Current constituency
- Party: National Democratic Congress
- MP: Emmanuel Armah Kofi Buah

Ellembelle is a parliamentary constituency in Ghana. It elects one Member of Parliament (MP) by the first past the post system of election. Emmanuel Armah Kofi Buah is the member of parliament for the constituency. He was elected on the ticket of the National Democratic Congress (NDC) with a majority of 1,649 votes. He took over from Freddie Blay, who had represented the constituency on the ticket of the Convention People's Party (CPP).

== See also ==
- List of Ghana Parliament constituencies
