= Ignatius Baffour-Awuah =

Ghanaian politician

Hon. Ignatius Baffour-Awuah MP
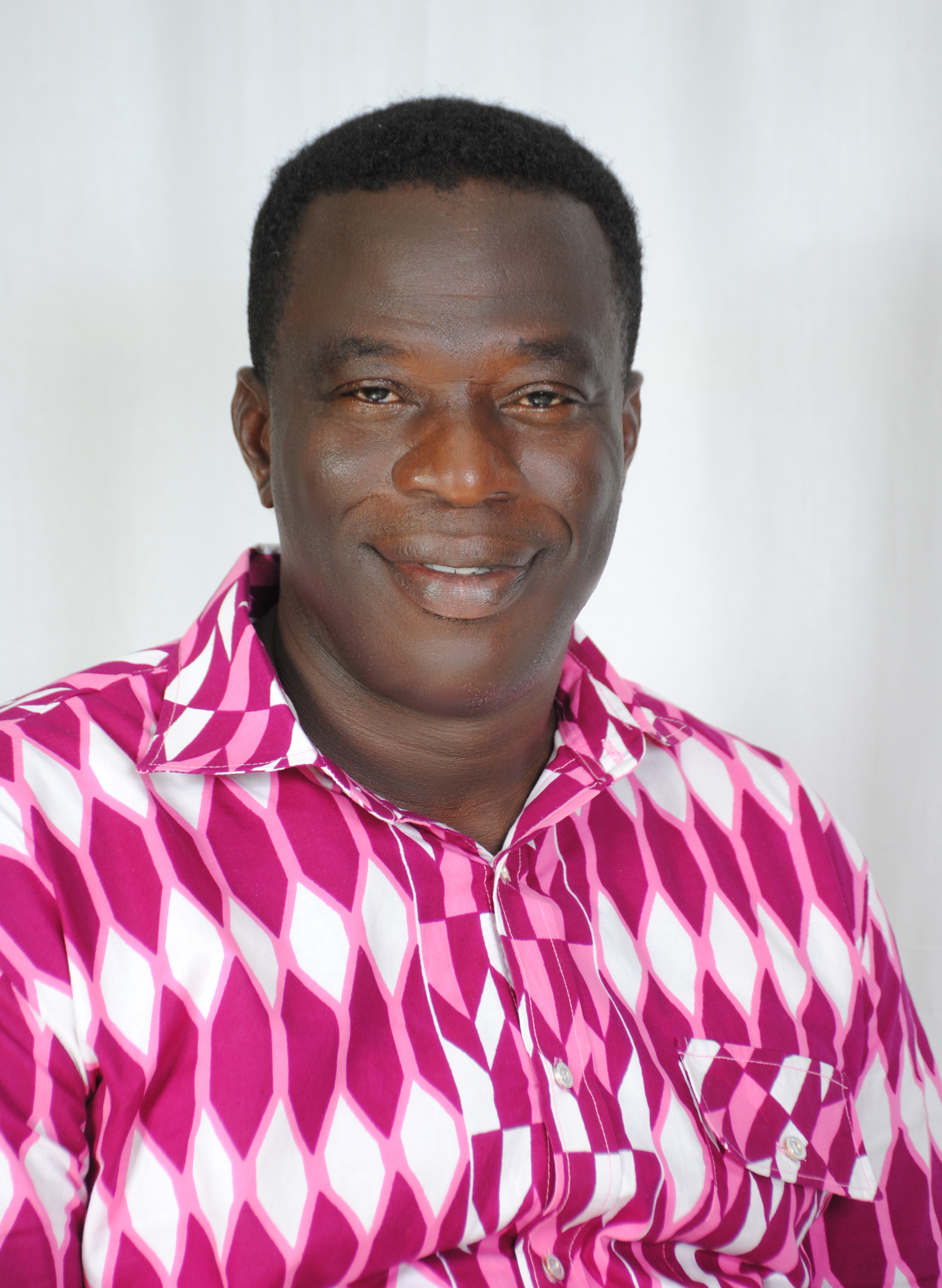

Member of Parliament for Sunyani West Constituency
- In office 7 January 2013 – 6 January 2025
- Preceded by: Millicent Yeboah Amankwah

Personal details
- Born: Ignatius Baffour-Awuah; 24 August 1966 (age 59) Nsoatre
- Party: New Patriotic Party
- Occupation: Politician
- Committees: House Committee; Privileges Committee and Committee of Selection Committee

Ignatius Baffour-Awuah (born 24 August 1966), a Ghanaian politician is the former Minister of Employment and Labour Relations.

== Early life and education ==
He was born on 24 August 1966 and hails from Nsoatre in the Bono Region of Ghana. He had his bachelor's degree in accounting in 1992. He also had his post-graduate diploma in management consultancy in 2017.

== Political life ==
He joined the New Patriotic Party and was a member of President Kufour's government as a District Chief Executive of the Sunyani District Assembly. He later became the deputy regional minister for the Brong-Ahafo region and subsequently became the regional minister under the same Kuffour administration. He ran for Member of Parliament for the Sunyani West constituency and won in the 2008 parliamentary elections. His party, the NPP however lost the presidential election. He was re-elected as MP in the same constituency in 2012 and 2016, 2020. Unfortunately, he lost the parliamentary seat to Hon. Millicent Amankwah in the 2024 election.

=== Cabinet minister ===
In May 2017, President Nana Akufo-Addo named Baffour-Awuah as part of nineteen ministers who would form his cabinet. The names of the 19 ministers were submitted to the Parliament of Ghana and announced by the Speaker of the House, Rt. Hon. Prof. Mike Ocquaye. As a Cabinet minister, Baffour-Awuah is part of the inner circle of the president and is to aid in key decision-making activities in the country.

==== Committees ====
Baffour-Awuah was a member of House Committee; a member of Privileges Committee and also a member of Committee of Selection Committee.

== Career ==
Hon Baffour Awuah started his career as an Accountant working with the European Union funded Micro-projects in Atebubu. He then worked as a management trainee and eventually became the Operations Manager for Nsotreman Rural Bank.

In 2001, he made his official entrance into local politics being appointed as the District Chief Executive (DCE) for the Sunyani District Assembly. He served as the DCE for four years before becoming the Deputy Regional Minister of the Brong Ahafo Region in 2005 and later in 2006 -2008 he was made the substantive Regional Minister.

== Personal life ==
Baffour-Awuah is married with three children. He is a Catholic.

== Arrest ==
On February 3, 2025, Baffour-Awuah was arrested by Ghana police service on suspicion of murder. He was arrested in connection with the murder of the supporter of the Kumasi Asante Kotoko FC Francis Yaw Frimpong, popularly known as Nana Pooley.
