= Samuel Okudzeto Ablakwa =

Ghanaian politician

The Honourable Samuel Okudzeto Ablakwa MP
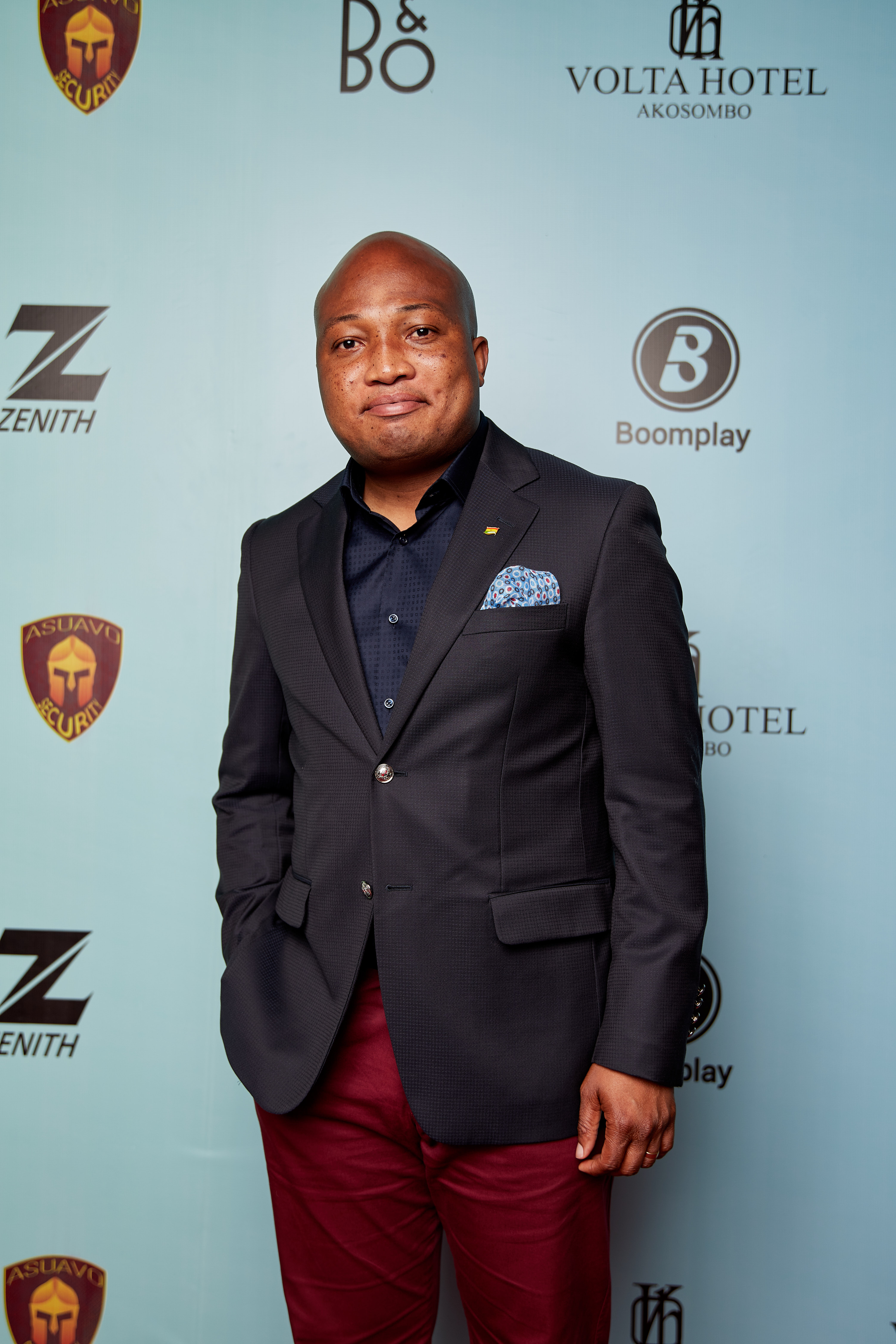
- Ablakwa in 2022

Minister for Minister for Foreign Affairs of Ghana
- Incumbent
- Assumed office 7 February 2025
- President: John Mahama
- Preceded by: Shirley Ayorkor Botchwey

Member of the Ghanaian Parliament for North Tongu
- Incumbent
- Assumed office 7 January 2013

Deputy Minister for Education
- In office 2013 – 7 January 2017
- President: John Mahama
- Succeeded by: Yaw Osei Adutwum

Deputy Minister for Information
- In office 2009–2013
- President: John Atta Mills
- Succeeded by: Felix Kwakye Ofosu

Personal details
- Born: 11 August 1980 (age 46) Korle-Bu, Accra, Ghana
- Party: National Democratic Congress
- Spouse: Nuhela Seidu
- Education: University of Ghana; Presbyterian Boys' Senior Secondary School - Legon (Presec-Legon)
- Occupation: Politician
- Committees: Foreign Affairs Committee; Appointments Committee

Samuel Okudzeto Ablakwa (born 11 August 1980) is a Ghanaian politician who has served as the Member of Parliament for North Tongu Constituency in the Volta region since 2013, elected on the ticket of the National Democratic Congress (NDC). He was appointed Minister for Foreign Affairs in 2025 under the government of President John Dramani Mahama. He previously served as Deputy Minister for Information and Deputy Minister for Education during the administrations of Presidents John Atta Mills and Mahama. He is a member of the 8th parliament of the fourth republic of Ghana.

== Early life and education ==
Ablakwa was born on 11 August 1980 in Aveyime-Battor in the Volta Region of Ghana. He attended the Presbyterian Boys' Secondary School, Legon (Presec-Legon), where he served as Vice President of the Scripture Union. He studied Political Science and Philosophy at the University of Ghana, earning a Bachelor of Arts degree. He later pursued a Master of Arts in communication, Media and Public Relations at the University of Leicester.

He also holds a certificate in leadership from the Harvard Kennedy School of Governance and a Master of Science degree in Defense and International Politics from the Ghana Armed Forces Command and Staff College. Prior to entering politics, he was the managing director of Savvi Solutions, a communications firm.

== Political career ==
=== Early involvement ===
While at the University of Ghana, Ablakwa served as President of the National Union of Ghana Students (NUGS) from 2005 to 2006. He was also involved in drafting youth policies for the NDC's 2008 election manifesto and was a member of the Committee for Joint Action (CJA), a pressure group advocating for economic and social reforms.

=== Member of Parliament ===
Ablakwa was first elected to Parliament in 2012, winning the North Tongu seat with 90.5% of valid votes cast. He was re-elected in the 2016, 2020, and 2024 general elections. As a Member of Parliament, he has served on the Appointments Committee and is the Ranking Member of the Foreign Affairs Committee. He also chaired the Assurances Committee and has been associated with a parliamentary initiative known as Operation Recover All Loot (ORAL), launched under the Mahama administration.

=== Deputy Ministerial roles ===
In 2009, Ablakwa was appointed Deputy Minister for Information at age 28, becoming one of the youngest ministers in Ghana's Fourth Republic. He later served as Deputy Minister for Education, focusing on tertiary education, from 2013 to 2016.

=== Minister for Foreign Affairs ===
In January 2025, Ablakwa was nominated and approved as Minister for Foreign Affairs. He was sworn into office in February 2025, succeeding Shirley Ayorkor Botchwey.

== Public initiatives ==
In August 2023, Ablakwa announced plans for a public demonstration under the theme Enough of the Looting, focused on issues of public accountability.

In February 2024, he inaugurated a housing project for victims displaced by the Akosombo Dam spillage, an initiative led by former President John Dramani Mahama.

== Personal life ==
Ablakwa is married to Nuhela Seidu, a lawyer and daughter of the late Mumuni Abudu Seidu. They have two children. He is a Christian. His uncle, Sam Okudzeto, is a lawyer and founder of Sena Chartered Secretaries Limited.

== Philanthropy ==
In 2022, Ablakwa awarded a scholarship to Samelia Mekporsigbe, a pupil from Battor DA Primary School, who had won the Volta Regional USAID Learning Initiative competition.

== Awards and recognition ==
Ablakwa has received several recognitions, including:

- Outstanding Youth Leader in West Africa by the West Africa Students' Union (2009)
- Special Alumnus Award by the National Union of Ghana Students (2009)
- Recognition from the Mepe and Tepa Traditional Councils

== Employment ==
- Minister for Foreign Affairs (2025–present)
- Deputy Minister for Education (2013–2016)
- Deputy Minister for Information (2009–2013)
- Member of Parliament, North Tongu (2013–present)
- Managing Director, Savvi Solutions (2007–2009)
