= Joe Gidisu =

Ghanaian politician

Hon. Joe Kwashie Gidisu

Member of the Ghana Parliament for Central Tongu
- Incumbent
- Assumed office Jan 2005
- Preceded by: First
- Majority: 12,488

Member of the Ghana Parliament for North Tongu
- In office Jan 2001 – Jan 2005
- Preceded by: Austin Gamey
- Succeeded by: Charles Hodogbey
- Majority: 32,220

Minister for Roads and Highways
- Incumbent
- Assumed office Feb 2009
- President: John Atta Mills

Personal details
- Party: National Democratic Congress
- Children: 3
- Education: University of Ghana
- Profession: Teacher
- Committees: Committee on Members Holding Offices of Profit; Lands and Forestry committee

Joe Kwashie Gidisu is a politician and teacher and a former Minister for Roads and Highways of Ghana.

== Early life and education ==
Joe Gidisu was born on 22 February 1952 at Bakpa Alabonu in the Volta Region of Ghana. He had his primary education at the Bakpa Alabonu Local Authority Primary School between 1959 and 1963.

He then attended the Mafi Devime Local Authority Middle School which he completed in 1967. He then proceeded to the Kibi Men's Training College where he obtained the Teachers' Certificate 'A'. Between 1975 and 1977, he attended the Advanced Teacher Training College at Winneba where he obtained the Specialist Teachers' Certificate.

Gidisu then attended the University of Ghana where he obtained B.A. Hons in 1981. He proceeded to the Netherlands where he undertook postgraduate studies at the Institute of Social Studies, The Hague where he obtained the M.A. in Development Studies.

== Career ==
Gidisu taught at the Bontibor Local Authority Primary School between 1971 and 1973. After leaving the Kibi Men's Training College, he taught at the Dormaa Secondary School between 1977 and 1978.

== Politics ==
Gidisu was elected as Member of Parliament for North Tongu in the December 2000 parliamentary election. After boundaries were redrawn, he stood for and won the seat for the Central Tongu in the 2004 Ghanaian parliamentary election and occupied that seat in January 2005.

He retained his seat in the 2008 Ghanaian parliamentary election. Following this election, he was appointed as Minister for Roads and Highways in February, 2009 by John Evans Atta Mills, President of the Republic of Ghana.

Parliament of Ghana
Preceded by Austin Gamey	North Tongu; 2001 – 2005	Succeeded by Charles Hodogbey
New title	Central Tongu; 2005 – present	Incumbent
Political offices
Preceded by Richard Anane	Minister for Roads and Highways; 2009 – present	Incumbent
