= Okere (Ghana parliament constituency) =

Constituency in Ghana

- constituency for the Parliament of Ghana
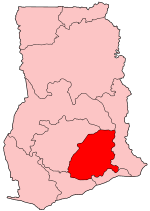
- District: Okere District
- Region: Eastern Region of Ghana

Current constituency
- Party: New Patriotic Party
- MP: Daniel Nana Addo-Kenneth

Okere is a parliament constituency in the Republic of Ghana. Hon. Daniel Nana Addo-Kenneth is the member of parliament for the constituency. He was elected on the ticket of the New Patriotic Party (NPP) in 2024 and won with a total number of 9,080 votes representing 68.43% of the vote cast to become the MP. He succeeded Dan Botwe who had represented the constituency in the 5th, 6th, 7th and 8th Republic parliament on the ticket of the New Patriotic Party (NPP). The Okere constituency is one of the 276 constituencies under the 9th Parliament of the Republic of Ghana.

== See also ==
- List of Ghana Parliament constituencies
- MPs elected in the Ghanaian parliamentary election, 2008
