= Ministry of Employment and Labour Relations (Ghana) =

Government ministry of Ghana

Agency overview
- Formed: 2013
- Jurisdiction: Government of Ghana
- Headquarters: Accra, Ghana
- Minister responsible: Hon. Ignatius Baffour-Awuah (MP), Minister of Employment and Labour Relations
- Website: www.melr.gov.gh

The Ministry of Employment and Labour Relations is mandated to formulate policies on Labour and Employment issues, develop sector plans, coordinate Employment and Labour related interventions across sectors, promote harmonious labour relations and workplace safety, monitor & evaluate policies, programmes/ projects for accelerated employment creation for national development. Its offices are located in Accra, Greater Accra.

== Objectives of the Ministry ==
The Policy Objectives pursued by the Ministry are stipulated in the National Medium Term Development Policy Framework (NMTDPF) for the period 2014–2017. These Policy objectives form the basis for the medium-term programmes being implemented by the Ministry.

== Mandate ==
The Ministry is mandated to formulate, plan, coordinate, monitor and evaluate policies, programmes/projects and the performance of the Employment & Labour Relations Sector towards accelerated employment generation for national development; to promote harmonious industrial (labour) relations and ensure workplace safety; as well as to create an enabling policy environment and opportunities for profitable job creation, career and professional development.
