= Ministry of Lands and Natural Resources (Ghana) =

Government ministry of Ghana

The Ministry of Lands and Natural Resources is a Government of Ghana ministry with the responsibility of formulating policies and exercising oversight responsibilities for all land and resources in Ghana. The ministry is headed by Emmanuel Armah Kofi Buah.

== Setup ==
The Ministry of Lands and Natural Resources was established under Section 11 of the Civil Service Law 1993 PNDC Law 327. The ministry as part of its mandate is to ensure the sustainable management and utilization of the nation's lands, forests and wildlife resources as well as the efficient management of the mineral resources for socio-economic growth and development. The Ministry consists of three sub-sectors; Lands, Forestry and Mining. The recently established Ghana GoldBod operates under this ministry.
