= Emmanuel Armah Kofi Buah =

Ghanaian politician (born 1966)

The Honourable Emmanuel Armah Kofi Buah MP
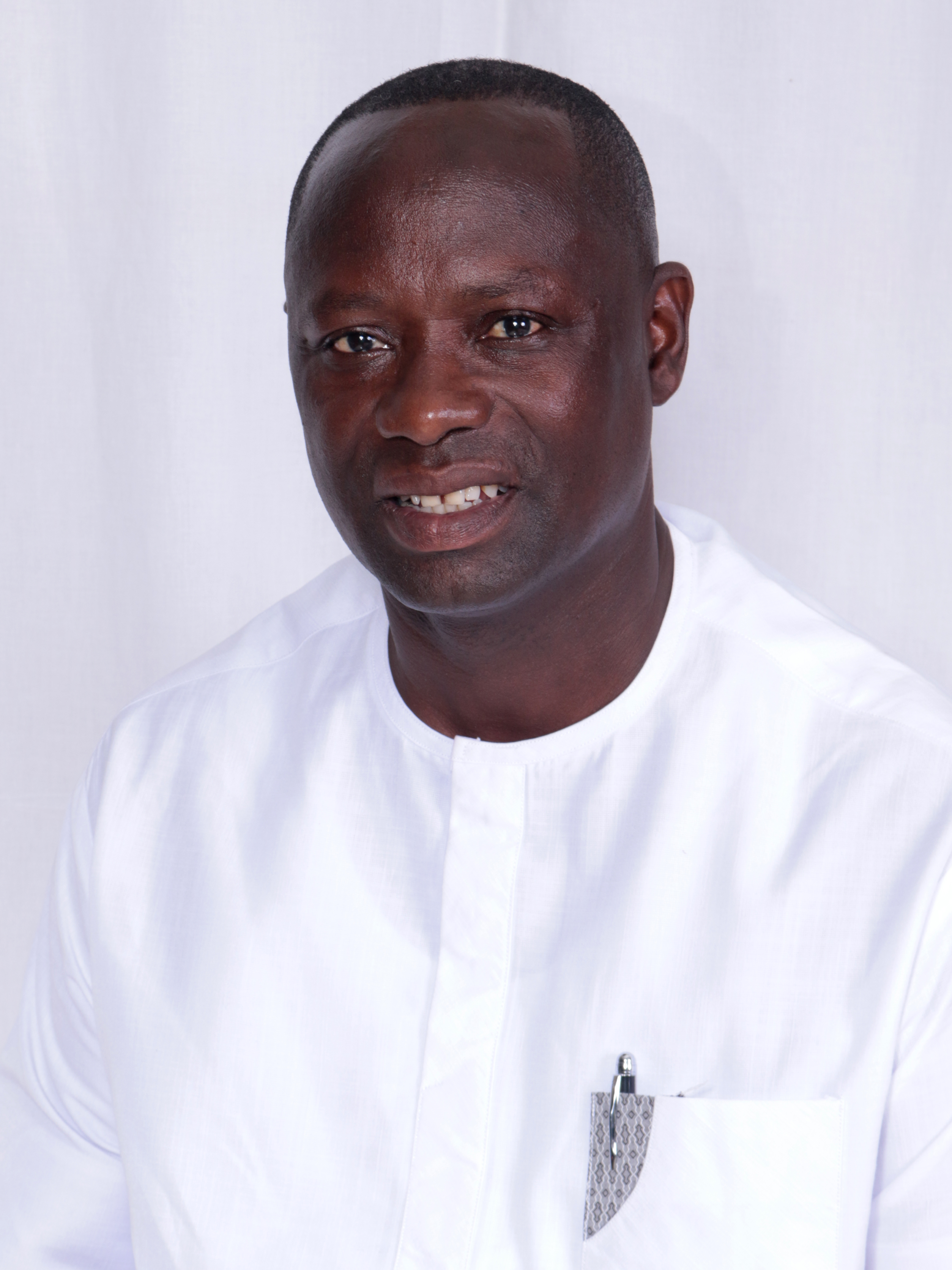

Minister for Ministry of Lands and Natural Resources (Ghana)
- Incumbent
- Assumed office February 2025
- Preceded by: Samuel Abu Jinapor

Former Minister for Ministry of Energy and Petroleum (Ghana)
- In office January 2013 – January 2017
- Preceded by: Joe Oteng-Adjei
- Succeeded by: Boakye Agyarko

Ellembelle
- Incumbent
- Assumed office January 2009
- President: John Dramani Mahama
- Preceded by: Freddie Blay

Personal details
- Born: Emmanuel Armah Kofi Buah; 10 May 1966 (age 60) Atuabo, Ghana
- Party: National Democratic Congress
- Spouse: Joyce Buah
- Children: 2
- Education: Kwame Nkrumah University of Science and Technology; University of Maryland University College (MSc)
- Committees: Trade, Industry and Tourism Committee; Members Holding Offices of Profit Committee; Privileges Committee; Committee of Selection Committee

Emmanuel Armah Kofi Buah (born 1966) is a Ghanaian politician, Member of Parliament of Ellembelle constituency in the Western Region, and the Minister of Lands and Natural Resources.

He served in the government of Ghana as Minister of Energy and Petroleum in the John Mahama administration from 2013 to 2016. He is a member of the National Democratic Congress and was the Deputy Minority Leader in the eighth Parliament of Ghana after replacing James Klutse Avedzi.

== Early life and education ==
Emmanuel Armah Kofi Buah hails from Atuabo in the Western Region. He holds a law degree from the Kwame Nkrumah University of Science and Technology and a Master of Science in Management from the University of Maryland, University College in the United States.

== Politics ==
In 2009, Kofi Buah was nominated by President Atta Mills to serve as deputy Minister of Energy. On 17 January 2013, Buah was named Minister for Energy and Petroleum. He was succeeded by Hon. Boakye Agyarko in 2017 when the New Patriotic Party won the 2016 Presidential elections. He has been a member of parliament for the Ellembelle Constituency since 2009. He serves on the Trade, Industry, and Tourism Committee, Members Holding Offices of Profit Committee, Privileges Committee, and Committee of Selection Committee.

In August 2025, following the death of the Minister for Environment in a military helicopter crash in the Ashanti Region, former President John Dramani Mahama appointed Buah to act as Minister for Environment, Science, Technology and Innovation.

== Personal life ==
Buah has two children. He is a Christian.

He shared his insights on the top three things leaders do in an episode of Logistics with Purpose. During this podcast, he also shared his early life

== See also ==
- List of Mahama government ministers

Parliament of Ghana
Political offices
Preceded by Joe Oteng-Adjei	Minister for Energy and Petroleum; 2013 – 2017	Succeeded by Boakye Agyarko
Parliament of Ghana
Preceded by Freddie Blay	Member of Parliament for Ellembelle; 2013 – present	Incumbent
