= Adamu =

Adamu is a surname or given name.

== Mononym ==
- Adamu (Assyrian king) (lived c. 2400 BC — c. 2300 BC), an Assyrian king

== Given name ==
- Adamu Aliero (born 1957), Nigerian politician, governor of Kebbi State in Nigeria (1999–2007)
- Adamu Atta (1927–2014), Nigerian politician, first civilian governor of the Nigerian Kwara State
- Adamu Bello (born 1951), Nigerian politician
- Adamu Ciroma (1934–2018), Nigerian politician and Governor of the Central Bank of Nigeria
- Adamu Daramani Sakande (1962–2020), Ghanaian politician and a member of Parliament
- Adamu Garba Talba (born 1952), Nigerian politician and Senator
- Adamu Gumba (born 1948), Nigerian politician and Senator
- Adamu Hashimu Ranga, Nigerian politician
- Adamu Maikori (1942–2020), Nigerian lawyer, banker and politician
- Adamu Mohammed (born 1983), Ghanaian footballer
- Adamu Sidi Ali (born 1952), Nigerian politician and farmer
- Adamu Tesfaw (born 1922), also called Qes Adamu Tesfaw, an Ethiopian artist and former priest
- Adamu Wayya or Dan Maraya or Adamu Danmaraya Jos (1946–2015), Nigerian Hausa griot best known for playing the kontigi
- Adamu Waziri (born 1952), Nigerian police officer, Nigerian minister of Police Affairs

== Middle name ==
- Abubakar Adamu Mohamed (born 1997), Nigerian footballer
- Abubakar Adamu Mohamed (born 1997), Nigerian footballer
- Abubakar Adamu Rasheed, Nigerian academician, administrator, Professor of English
- Amina Adamu Aliyu, Nigerian judge
- Baba Adamu Iyam, Nigerian military officer who served as Military Administrator
- Gagdi Adamu Yusuf (born 1980), Nigerian politician and Member of Nigerian Federal House of Representatives
- Gibril Adamu Mohammed, Ghanaian politician
- Mohammed Adamu Bello (born 1957), Nigerian politician, businessman and Senator
- Mohammed Adamu Ramadan (born 1975), Ghanaian politician
- Mustapha Adamu Animashaun (1885–1968), prominent Lagos Islamic leader
- Shuaibu Adamu Ahmed, Nigerian politician and minister
- Suleiman Adamu Kazaure, Nigerian politician and minister
- Suleman Adamu Sanid (born 1970), Ghanaian politician and Member of Parliament
- Zainab Adamu Bulkachuwa (born 1950), Nigerian Judge and President of the Nigerian courts of appeal Justice

== Surname ==
- Abdalla Uba Adamu (born 1956), Nigerian academic, educator, publisher and media scholar
- Abdulahi Bala Adamu, Nigerian politician and Senator
- Abdullahi Adamu (born 1945), Nigerian politician
- Abu Kasim Adamu, Nigerian botanist and professor of science
- Adamu Adamu (born 1954), Nigerian accountant, journalist, minister
- Ahmed Adamu, Nigerian petroleum economist and lecturer
- Amos Adamu, Nigerian administrator, Director General of the Nigerian National Sports Commission
- Baba Adamu (born 1979), known occasionally simply by his nickname Armando, Ghanaian footballer
- Birtukan Adamu Ali (born 1992), Ethiopian runner
- Charles Adamu (born 1977), Ghanaian boxer
- Edward Lametek Adamu, Nigerian quantity surveyor, business consultant and leadership strategist
- Fatima Adamu (born 1972), Nigerian entrepreneur and philanthropist
- Ibrahim Adamu (born 1981), Nigerian badminton player
- Junior Adamu (born 2001), Nigerian-born Austrian footballer
- Mamudu Adamu (born 1960), Nigerian judoka
- Mohammed Adamu (born 1961), Nigerian police officer, formerly a Nigerian inspector-general of police
- Mohammed Adamu (disambiguation), a number of people with the name
- Semira Adamu (born 1978), Nigerian refugee who was suffocated to death with a pillow, by two Belgian police officers during her expulsion
- Suleiman Adamu (1963–2020), Nigerian politician. Member of the Nasarawa State House of Assembly
- Yahaya Adamu (born 1993), Nigerian footballer
- Yakubu Adamu (born 1981), Nigerian footballer

== Fictional characters ==
- Emmanuel Adamu, Chef Sydney's father
- Sydney Adamu, fictional American chef on The Bear TV series

== See also ==
- Adamu Tafawa Balewa College of Education, Nigeria
- Adamus (disambiguation)
- Adămuș, a commune in Mureș County, Transylvania, Romania
- Hussaini Adamu Federal Polytechnic (HAFEDPOLY), polytechnic located in Kazaure, Jigawa State, Nigeria
