= Nigerian National Assembly delegation from the Federal Capital Territory =

FCT's delegation in Nigeria's National Assembly

The Nigerian National Assembly delegation from the Federal Capital Territory comprises one Senator representing Abuja, and two Representatives representing Abuja-South and AMAC/Bwari .

== Fourth Republic ==
=== 10th National Assembly (2023–till date) ===
OFFICE	NAME	PARTY	CONSTITUENCY	TERM
Senator	Ireti Kingibe	LP	Federal Capital Territory	2023–2027
Representative	Ajiya Abdulrahaman	APC	Abaji/Kuje/Kwali Gwagwalada	2023–2027
Representative	Joshua Chinedu Obika	LP	Abuja Municipal / Bwari	2023–2027

=== 9th National Assembly (2019–2023) ===
OFFICE	NAME	PARTY	CONSTITUENCY	TERM
Senator	Philips Tanimu Aduda	PDP	Federal Capital Territory	2019–2023
Representative	Hassan Sokodabo Usman	PDP	Abaji/Kuje/Kwali Gwagwalada	2019–2023
Representative	Micah Yohanna Jiba	PDP	Abuja Municipal / Bwari	2019–2023

=== 8th National Assembly (2015–2019) ===
OFFICE	NAME	PARTY	CONSTITUENCY	TERM
Senator	Philips Tanimu Aduda	PDP	Federal Capital Territory	2015–2019
Representative	Angulu Zakari	APC	Abaji/Kuje/Kwali Gwagwalada	2015–2019
Representative	Zephaniah Bitrus Jisalo	PDP	Abuja Municipal / Bwari	2015–2019

=== 7th National Assembly (2011–2015) ===
OFFICE	NAME	PARTY	CONSTITUENCY	TERM
Senator	Philips Tanimu Aduda	PDP	Federal Capital Territory	2011–2015
Representative	Egah Dobi	PDP	Abaji/Kuje/Kwali Gwagwalada	2011–2015
Representative	Zephaniah Bitrus Jisalo	PDP	Abuja Municipal / Bwari	2011–2015

=== 6th National Assembly (2007–2011) ===
OFFICE	NAME	PARTY	CONSTITUENCY	TERM
Senator	Philips Tanimu Aduda	PDP	Federal Capital Territory	2007–2011
Representative	Egah Dobi	PDP	Abaji/Kuje/Kwali Gwagwalada	2007–2011
Representative	Amanda Iyabode Pam	ANPP	Abuja Municipal / Bwari	2007–2011

=== 5th National Assembly (2003–2007) ===
OFFICE	NAME	PARTY	CONSTITUENCY	TERM
Senator	Isa Maina	PDP	Federal Capital Territory	2003–2007
Representative	Ado Sidi	ANPP	Abaji/Kuje/Kwali Gwagwalada	2003–2007
Representative	Philip Tanimu Aduda	PDP	Abuja Municipal / Bwari	2003–2007

=== 4th National Assembly (1999–2003) ===
OFFICE	NAME	PARTY	CONSTITUENCY	TERM
Senator	Khairat Abdulrazaq-Gwadabe	PDP	Federal Capital Territory	1999–2003
Representative	Yusuf Usman Babatakwa	PDP	Abaji/Kuje/Kwali Gwagwalada	1999–2003
Representative	Nicholas Ukachukwu	PDP	Abuja Municipal / Bwari	1999–2003
