= Mubarak Mohammed Muntaka =

Ghanaian politician (born 1971)

The Honourable Muntaka Mohammed Mubarak MP
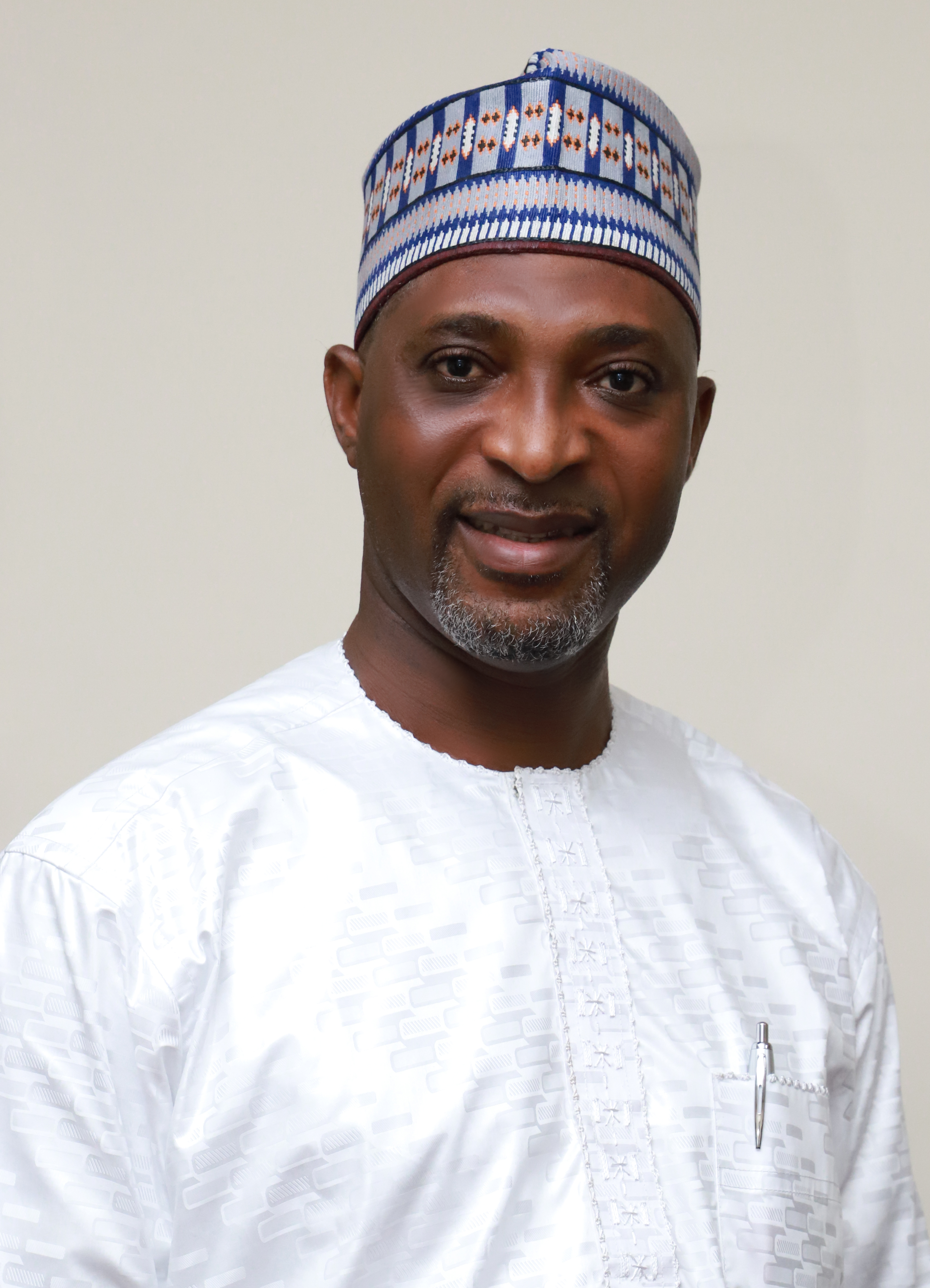

Minister for the Interior
- Incumbent
- Assumed office 30 January 2025
- President: John Mahama
- Preceded by: Henry Quartey

Member of Ghanaian Parliament for Asawase Constituency
- Incumbent
- Assumed office 21 April 2005
- Preceded by: Gibril Adamu Mohammed

Minister for Youth and Sports
- In office January 2009 – 25 June 2009
- President: John Atta Mills
- Preceded by: Nana Akomea
- Succeeded by: Abdul-Rashid Pelpuo

Personal details
- Born: Muntaka; 17 October 1971 (age 54) Kumbungu
- Party: National Democratic Congress
- Spouse: Meimuna Ezideen Abdul Wahab
- Relations: Ras Mubarak (nephew)
- Children: 5 children
- Education: Kwame Nkrumah University of Science and Technology
- Occupation: Development Planner / Quantity Surveyor
- Profession: Teacher
- Committees: House Committee; Appointments Committee; Health Committee; Mines and Energy Committee; Committee for Selection Committee; Business Committee and Standing Orders Committee

Alhaji Mohammed Mubarak Muntaka is the Member of Parliament for Asawase in the Ashanti Region of Ghana of the 4th, 5th, 6th, 7th and the 8th parliaments of the 4th Republic of Ghana. He was the Minority Chief Whip in the Parliament of Ghana.

== Early life and education ==
Muntaka was born on 17 October 1971 and hails from Akuse in the Ashanti Region of Ghana but his parents originally came from the northern part of Ghana in a town called Kumbungu.

He is a product of the Kwame Nkrumah University of Science and Technology. He acquired a Master of Science degree in development policy and planning from the university in the year 2004. Muntaka wrote his common entrance exam in 1987.and continued to gain his BSc agric (agriculture economist) in 2000 and MSc development policy and planning (development planner) in 2004.

== Career ==
Muntaka was the head of research at one of the units (RME) of Adwumapa Buyers Limited, a cocoa buying company.

== Political career ==
=== Member of Parliament ===
Muntaka first entered the Parliament of Ghana on the ticket of the National Democratic Congress in 2005 when he won a by-election in the Asawase constituency with a majority of 11,142, replacing the late Dr Gibril Adamu Mohammed also of the NDC who had won the seat in December 2004 with a majority of 4,474. The Ghana Center for Democratic Development deemed this by-election as "fair and transparent, but not free from fear." He retained his seat in the Ghanaian parliamentary election held in December 2008. He also won the next election in 2012. Muntaka was the Chief Majority Whip in parliament for the NDC caucus, the majority in Government.

=== Minister for Youth and Sports ===
He was the Minister for Youth and Sports in the Ghana government. In January 2009, Mubarak was appointed as Minister-designate for the Youth and Sports Ministry by President John Evans Atta Mills. His appointment was applauded by the National Youth Council due to his youthfulness and youthful exuberance as by the time of his appointment, he was 39 years. He served as Minister for Youth and sports until he was made to proceed on a leave while allegations of corruption leveled against him were investigated. However, he resigned from government following the acceptance by President Mills of the findings of the investigating committee. He was replaced subsequently by Abdul-Rashid Pelpuo.

=== Committees ===
Muntaka holds membership in multiple committees, including the House Committee, the Appointments Committee, the Standing Orders Committee, the Health Committee, the Mines and Energy Committee, the Business Committee, and the Committee of Selection Committee.

=== Minister of Interior ===
He was appointed as Minister in charge of Interior by President John Mahama in March 2025.

== Elections ==
Muntaka was elected as the member of parliament for the Asawase constituency during the by-elections in 2005 after the demise of Gibril Adamu Mohammed the then Member of Parliament for the Asawase constituency.

In 2008, he won the general elections on the ticket of the National Democratic Congress for the same constituency. His constituency was one of the three Ashanti Region parliamentary seats out of thirty-nine that the National Democratic Congress won in that election. The National Democratic Congress won a majority total of 113 parliamentary seats out of 230 seats.

He was elected with 36,557 votes out of 64,443 total valid votes cast equivalent to 56.73% of total valid votes cast. He was elected over Dr. Mohammed Abdul-Kabir of the New Patriotic Party, Elyasu Mohammed of the People's National Convention, Mohammed Bashir Tijani of the Democratic Freedom Party and Alhaji Baba Musah of the Convention People's Party. These obtained 27,168, 371, 86 and 261 votes respectively of the total valid votes cast. This was equivalent to 42.16%, 0.58%, 0.13 and 0.41% respectively of the total votes cast.

In 2012, he won the general elections once again for the same constituency. He was elected with 43,917 votes out of 77,034 total valid votes cast. This was equivalent to 57.01% of total valid votes cast. He was elected over Nana Okyere-Tawiah Antwi of the New Patriotic Party, Jerry Joseph Quayson of the Progressive People's Party, Abdulai Umaru of the People's National Convention, Elias Mohammed of the Convention People's Party, Yakubu Adams Zakaria of the National Democratic Party and Alhassan Abdul Majeed an independent candidate. These obtained 31,013, 458, 267, 251, 182 and 946 votes respectively of the total valid votes cast. These were equivalent to 40.26%, 0.59%, 0.35%, 0.33%, 0.24% and 1.23% respectively of the total votes cast.

Muntaka retained the parliamentary seat in the 2020 general election to represent in the 8th Parliament of the Fourth Republic. He won with 51,659 votes while the NPP parliamentary candidate polled 31,256.

Muntaka on Saturday, 13 May 2023, was retained as National Democratic Congress parliamentary representative for the Member of Parliament for Asawase Constituency by beating Masawudu Mubarick in the NDC 2023 primaries for a chance to represent the party in the 2024 parliamentary elections. He won with 1,063 votes against Masawudu who polled 735 votes.

Although supporters of Muntaka Mubarak and his contender, Masawudu Mubarick got into a scuffle that was swiftly curtailed by personnel of the Ghana Police Service. The intervention of the police officers prevented the confusion from escalating. Supporters of Muntaka alleged that some supporters of Masawudu Mubarick booed at the incumbent Asawase MP who was leaving the centre after casting his ballot.

== Controversies ==
During the 2020 general election, Muntaka was said to have allowed his 6-year-old daughter to thumbprint his ballot on his behalf, an act that attracted wide condemnation as the Ghana electoral laws only permit people above 18 years to participate in elections.

He was requested by President John Atta Mills to proceed on leave while allegations of corruption against him were investigated. He however resigned from government following the acceptance by President Mills of the findings of the investigating committee.

In January 2021, he allegedly said a Supreme Court judge offered an inducement to a female member of parliament of the NDC in an attempt to persuade her to cast a vote for Mike Oquaye during the Speaker of parliament election. He was widely condemned by lawyers and was asked to provide evidences.

He was charged with allegations of abuse of office and conflict of interest by some officials of the Ministry of Youth and Sports for using his position to secure a German visa for his alleged girlfriend. However, after investigations by Chraj he was cleared of all charges on the basis that there was no enough evidence to convict him of the crime per the laws of Ghana.

Muntaka engaged in a verbal fight with the MP of Assin Central Kennedy Agyapong when he confronted him about dragging him to the Parliamentary Privileges Committees for allegedly calling on to attackers to deal with Ahmed Hussein Suale an investigative journalist with Tiger Eye who was later murdered by unknown assassins. They two MP's where seen in a video insulting each other in parliament.

== Political Statements ==
In November 2025, he revealed that investigations into the electoral violence and brutalities in the 2024 Ghanaian general election and the 2024 Ghanaian general election which resulted in the deaths of some 7 people were caused by the military and police. He revealed this while providing an update on government's review of electoral violence cases.

== Personal life ==
Muntaka is married to Meimuna Ezideen Adul Wahab and has five (5) children. He is a Muslim.

== See also ==
- Asawase constituency
- List of Mills government ministers

Parliament of Ghana
Preceded by Gibril Adamu Mohammed	Member of Parliament for Asawase; 2005 – present	Incumbent
Political offices
Preceded by Henry Quartey	Minister for the Interior; 2025 – present	Incumbent
Preceded by Nana Akomea	Minister for Youth and Sports; 2009	Succeeded by Abdul-Rashid Pelpuo
