= 2015 Nigerian Senate election in the Federal Capital Territory =

2015 Nigerian Senate election in Federal Capital Territory

The 2015 Nigerian Senate election in Federal Capital Territory was held on March 28, 2015, to elect the member of the Nigerian Senate to represent Federal Capital Territory. Philips Tanimu Aduda representing FCT Senatorial District won on the platform of Peoples Democratic Party.

== Overview ==
Affiliation	Party		Total
Affiliation	PDP	APC	Total
Before Election			1
After Election	1	–	1

== Summary ==
District	Incumbent	Party	Elected Senator	Party
FCT Senatorial District			Philips Tanimu Aduda	PDP

== Results ==
=== FCT Senatorial District ===
Peoples Democratic Party candidate Philips Tanimu Aduda won the election, defeating All Progressives Congress candidate Adamu Muhammad and other party candidates.

2015 Nigerian Senate election in Federal Capital Territory
Party	Candidate	Votes	%
PDP	Philips Tanimu Aduda		
APC	Adamu Muhammad		
Total votes			
PDP hold			
