= 2011 Nigerian Senate election in the Federal Capital Territory =

2011 Nigerian Senate election in Federal Capital Territory

The 2011 Nigerian Senate election in Federal Capital Territory was held on 9 April 2011, to elect the member of the Nigerian Senate to represent the Federal Capital Territory. Philips Tanimu Aduda representing FCT Senatorial District won on the platform of Peoples Democratic Party.

== Overview ==
Affiliation	Party		Total
Affiliation	PDP	ANPP	Total
Before Election	0	1	1
After Election	1	0	1

== Summary ==
District	Incumbent	Party	Elected Senator	Party
FCT Senatorial District	Usman Jibrin Wowo	ANPP	Philips Tanimu Aduda	PDP

== Results ==
=== FCT Senatorial District ===
Peoples Democratic Party candidate Philips Tanimu Aduda won the election, defeating Congress for Progressive Change candidate Musa Abari and other party candidates.

2011 Nigerian Senate election in Federal Capital Territory
Party	Candidate	Votes	%
PDP	Philips Tanimu Aduda		
CPC	Musa T Abari		
Total votes			
PDP hold			
