= Adamus =

Adamus may refer to:

- Adămuș, a commune in Mureș County, Transylvania, Romania
- Latin form of the given name Adam
- Adamus (surname), people with the name
- Pomus Adamus
- Adamus, a character from the Philippine fantasy drama series Encantadia Chronicles: Sang'gre

== See also ==
- Adam (disambiguation)
- Adamu, a given name and surname
