= 1999 Nigerian Senate election in the Federal Capital Territory =

1999 Nigerian Senate election in Federal Capital Territory

The 1999 Nigerian Senate election in Federal Capital Territory was held on February 20, 1999, to elect member of the Nigerian Senate to represent Federal Capital Territory. Khairat Abdulrazaq-Gwadabe representing FCT Senatorial District won on the platform of the Peoples Democratic Party.

== Overview ==
Affiliation	Party		Total
Affiliation	PDP	ANPP	Total
Before Election			1
After Election	1	0	1

== Summary ==
District	Incumbent	Party	Elected Senator	Party
FCT Senatorial District			Khairat Abdulrazaq-Gwadabe	PDP

== Results ==
=== FCT Senatorial District ===
The election was won by Khairat Abdulrazaq-Gwadabe of the Peoples Democratic Party.

1999 Nigerian Senate election in Federal Capital Territory
Party	Candidate	Votes	%
PDP	Khairat Abdulrazaq-Gwadabe		
Total votes			
PDP hold			
