= Mohammed Adamu (disambiguation) =

Mohammed Adamu may refer to:

- Mohammed Adamu (born 1961), Nigerian police officer, 20th Inspector General of Police
- Mohammed Adamu Aliero (born 1957), Nigerian politician
- Mohammed Adamu Ramadan (born 1975), Ghanaian politician

== See also ==
- Adamu Mohammed (born 1983), Ghanaian footballer
- Gibril Adamu Mohammed (1961–2005), Ghanaian politician
