= 1992 Nigerian Senate election in the Federal Capital Territory =

1992 Nigerian Senate election in Federal Capital Territory

The 1992 Nigerian Senate election in Federal Capital Territory was held on July 4, 1992, to elect member of the Nigerian Senate to represent Federal Capital Territory. Hassan Asa Haruna Tadanyigbe representing FCT Senatorial District won on the platform of the Social Democratic Party.

== Overview ==
Affiliation	Party		Total
Affiliation	SDP	NRC	Total
Before Election			1
After Election	1	0	1

== Summary ==
District	Incumbent	Party	Elected Senator	Party
FCT Senatorial District			Hassan Asa Haruna Tadanyigbe	SDP

== Results ==
=== FCT Senatorial District ===
The election was won by Hassan Asa Haruna Tadanyigbe of the Social Democratic Party.

1992 Nigerian Senate election in Federal Capital Territory
Party	Candidate	Votes	%
SDP	Hassan Asa Haruna Tadanyigbe		
Total votes			
SDP hold			
