= Animashaun =

Animashaun is a Yoruba surname common in Nigeria. It means “the one who gives freely”.

== Notable people with the surname ==
- Ayo Animashaun (born 1972), Nigerian entertainment executive
- Mustapha Adamu Animashaun (1885–1968), Nigerian astrologer
- Samuel Animashaun Perry, also known as Broda Shaggi, Nigerian comedian
