= 2003 Nigerian Senate election in the Federal Capital Territory =

2003 Nigerian Senate election in Federal Capital Territory

The 2003 Nigerian Senate election in the Federal Capital Territory was held on April 12, 2003, to elect members of the Nigerian Senate to represent Federal Capital Territory. Isah Maina, representing the FCT Senatorial District, won on the platform of the Peoples Democratic Party.

== Overview ==
Affiliation	Party		Total
Affiliation	PDP	ANPP	Total
Before Election			1
After Election	1	0	1

== Summary ==
District	Incumbent	Party	Elected Senator	Party
FCT Senatorial District			Isah Maina	PDP

== Results ==
=== FCT Senatorial District ===
The election was won by Isah Maina of the Peoples Democratic Party.

2003 Nigerian Senate election in Federal Capital Territory
Party	Candidate	Votes	%
PDP	Isah Maina		
Total votes			
PDP hold			
