= Ibrahim Cudjoe Quaye =

Ghanaian politician and publisher

Hon. Ibrahim Cudjoe Quaye

Member of Parliament for Ayawaso Central Constituency
- In office 7 January 1997 – 6 January 2001
- Preceded by: Said Sinare

Member of Parliament for Ayawaso Central Constituency
- In office 7 January 2005 – 6 January 2013

Personal details
- Born: 30 July 1937 (age 88) La, Ghana
- Party: New Patriotic Party
- Children: 5
- Education: Rapid Results College, Cambridge School
- Profession: Publisher

Sheikh Ibrahim Cudjoe Quaye born 30 July 1937 is a Ghanaian politician who represented the constituency of Ayawaso Central in the Parliament of Ghana from 1996 to 2011. He has also served as Regional Minister of the Greater Accra Region under Kufuor's government from 2001 to 2009.

== Early life and education ==
Quaye was born 30 July 1937. He hails from La-Accra in the Accra Region of Ghana. He is a product of the Cambridge School. He acquired a certificate in 1958. He is also a product of Rapid Results College. He acquired a Diploma in Business Administration from the college. This was in 1962. In 1967, he acquired a Diploma in Journalism from the same college.

== Career ==
Quaye is a publisher by profession.

== Political career ==
Quaye began his political career in 1969 when he became the parliamentary candidate for the Progress Party (PP) to represent the Bawku West constituency prior to the commencement of the 1969 Ghanaian parliamentary election.

Quaye is a member of the New Patriotic Party. He was elected into office in the 1996 Ghanaian General Elections and became a member of the second Parliament of the 4th Republic of Ghana to represent Ayawaso Central Constituency of the Greater Accra Region, and he assumed office in January 1997. He was re-elected to represent in the 3rd, 4th and 5th Parliament consecutively. He also served as the Greater Accra Regional Minister under the government of John Kufuor.

== Elections ==
Quaye was elected as the member of parliament for the Ayawaso Central constituency of the Greater Accra Region of Ghana in the 2004 Ghanaian general elections. He won on the ticket of the New Patriotic Party. His constituency was a part of the 16 parliamentary seats out of 27 seats won by the New Patriotic Party in that election for the Greater Accra Region. The New Patriotic Party won a majority total of 128 parliamentary seats out of 230 seats. He was elected with 36,021 votes out of 67,404 total valid votes cast. This was equivalent to 53.4% of total valid votes cast. He was elected over Zalia Seidu of the People's National Convention, Mariama Sinare of the National Democratic Congress, Christiana Martey of the Convention People's Party and Charles Boateng an independent candidate. These obtained 858, 29,360, 482 and 683 votes respectively of total valid votes cast. These were equivalent to 1.3%, 43.6%, 0.7% and 1.0% respectively of total valid votes cast.

In 2008, he won the general elections on the ticket of the New Patriotic Party. His constituency was part of the 18 parliamentary seats out of 27 seats won by the New Patriotic Party in that election in the Greater Accra Region. The New Patriotic Party won a minority total of 108 parliamentary seats out of 230 seats. He was elected with 30,915 votes out of 62,960 total valid votes cast. This was equivalent to 49.1% of total valid votes cast. He was selected over Kwasi Ofei Agyemang of the National Democratic Congress, Zalia Seidu of the People's National Convention, Daniel Kofi Aidoo of the Convention People's Party and Benjamin Bediako of the Democratic Freedom Party. These obtained 30,058, 622, 1,160 and 205 votes respectively of the total valid votes cast. These were equivalent to 47.74%, 0.99%, 1.84% and 0.33% respectively of total valid votes cast.

== Personal life ==
Quaye is a Muslim. He is married with five children.

== See also ==
- Busia government
- List of MPs elected in the 1969 Ghanaian parliamentary election
