= Said Sinare =

Ghanaian diplomat and politician

Amb. Said Sinare

Ghana Ambassador to Saudi Arabia
- In office October 2014 – January 2017
- Preceded by: Alhaji Abdulai Salifu
- Succeeded by: Sheikh T. B. Damba

Ghana Ambassador to Egypt
- In office January 2012 – October 2014
- Preceded by: Amin Amidu Sulemana
- Succeeded by: Lt Col Umar Sanda Ahmed

Member of Parliament for Ayawaso Central Constituency
- In office 7 January 1993 – 6 January 1997
- Preceded by: new parliament
- Succeeded by: Sheikh Ibrahim Cudjoe Quaye

Personal details
- Born: 14 October 1958 (age 68)
- Party: National Democratic Congress
- Relations: Kalsoume Sinare (sister); Anthony Baffoe (brother in law)
- Education: International Bureau of Investigation
- Occupation: Politician
- Profession: Investigator

Said Sinare (born 14 October 1958) is a Ghanaian diplomat and politician, who is a member of the National Democratic Congress (NDC). He is currently a National Vice Chairman of the party. He is a former member of parliament for Ayawaso Central Constituency. He is also a former Ambassador to Saudi Arabia and Egypt. Sinare is an investigator and the founder of Zongo for NDC, a group to help advocate to Muslims and period within the Zongos in Ghana.

== Early life and education ==
Said Sinare was born on 14 October 1958. He attended International Bureau of Investigation.

== Politics ==
=== Member of Parliament ===
In 1992, Sinare entered into politics when he was elected member of parliament of the 1st parliament of the 4th Republic after President Jerry John Rawlings had enacted a new constitution moving Ghana into a multi party state. He served as the member of parliament for the Ayawaso Central Constituency for one term and lost the seat to Sheikh Ibrahim Codjoe Quaye in when he was bidding for a second term in 1996 elections.

He returned in 2008 to the party after his resignation barely a week ago. He told Joy News he was not ready to join any political party; but was firm the NDC will win the 2008 elections.

=== Ambassador ===
Sinare was appointed as Ambassador to Egypt in January 2012 by President John Evans Atta Mills to replace Amin Amidu Sulemana after a major reshuffle of his ministers and appointees. During his tenure he had to ensure safety for Ghanaians in Egypt and especially the Black Stars, the Ghana national football team when they were going to play their FIFA World Cup 2014 qualifying play off second leg game against Egypt in Cairo during the post-coup unrest in Egypt (2013–2014) after the 2013 Egyptian coup d'état.

In October 2014, Sinare was appointed by President John Dramani Mahama as Ghana's Ambassador to Saudi Arabia He served in that role until 2017 after his party lost power in the December 2016 Presidential elections and he was replaced by Sheikh T. B. Damba.

=== Vice Chairman of National Democratic Congress ===
In 2018 he stood for reelection as the vice-chairmanship position of the National Democratic Congress (NDC) along with Awudu Sofo Asorka, Sherry Ayittey, Yaw Owusu Obimpeh, Adu-Yeboah, Amadu Bukari Sorogho, Seth Ofosu-Ohene, Sumaila Mahama and Kwame Ampofo. At the end of the national congress he was voted to serve as one of the three vice chairpersons for the party with Awudu Sofo Asorka serving as 1st Vice, Sherry Ayittey serving as 2nd Vice and him as the 3rd Vice.

In 2020, Sinare was taken to intend violence or foment trouble in the 2020 elections, he said I'm not violent; I will never disturb Ghana's peace.

In 2021, he spoke during the burial service of the late former president of Ghana Jerry John Rawlings, he said: '' Rawlings happened to be the roots of Ghana's Socio-Economic fortune when he seized power as a captain in the Air Force '', he added you cannot talk about Ghana's March to Economic freedom and Political stability without Mentioning Rawlings Name.

== Personal life ==
He is the brother of Ghanaian actress and former model, Kalsoume Sinare who is married to retired Ghanaian international footballer Anthony Baffoe. He is a Muslim.
