= Ayawaso Central =

Ghana parliament constituency

- constituency for the Parliament of Ghana
- District: Accra Metropolis District
- Region: Greater Accra Region of Ghana

Current constituency
- Party: National Democratic Congress
- MP: Abdul Rauf Tongym Tubazu

Ayawaso Central is one of the constituencies represented in the Parliament of Ghana. It is one of the six newly created assemblies and districts that was inaugurated by Government of Ghana across the nation, simultaneously. It elects one Member of Parliament (MP) by the first past the post system of election. Abdul Rauf Tongym Tubazu is the member of parliament for the constituency.

== Members of Parliament ==
Election	Member	Party
1992	Said Sinare	National Democratic Congress
1996	Sheikh Ibrahim Cudjoe Quaye	New Patriotic Party
2000	Sheikh Ibrahim Cudjoe Quaye	New Patriotic Party
2002	Sheikh Ibrahim Cudjoe Quaye	New Patriotic Party
2004	Sheikh Ibrahim Cudjoe Quaye	New Patriotic Party
2008	Sheikh Ibrahim Cudjoe Quaye	New Patriotic Party
2012	Henry Quartey	New Patriotic Party
2016	Henry Quartey	New Patriotic Party

== Elections ==
MPs elected in the Ghanaian parliamentary election, 2008:Ayawaso Central Source: Ghana Home Page
Party	Candidate	Votes	%	±%
New Patriotic Party	Sheikh Ibrahim Cudjoe Quaye	30,915	49.1	—
National Democratic Congress	Kwasi Ofei Agyemang	30,068	47.7	—
Convention People's Party	Daniel Kofi Aidoo	1,160	1.8	—
People's National Convention	Zalia Seidu	622	1.0	—
Democratic Freedom Party	Benjamin Bediako	205	0.3	—
Majority		874	1.4	—
Turnout		—	—	—

== See also ==
- List of Ghana Parliament constituencies
- Ayawaso Central Municipal District
