= Adamus (surname) =

Adamus is a surname. Notable people with this surname include:

- Bartłomiej Adamus (born 2000), Polish weightlifter
- Bernard Adamus (born 1977), Canadian singer-songwriter
- Dariusz Adamus (born 1957), Polish javelin thrower
- Jan Tomasz Adamus (born 1968), Polish conductor, organist, chamber musician, recording artist and music administrator
- Sławomir Adamus (born 1961), Polish footballer

== See also ==
- Adomas
