= Abdul Rauf Tongym Tubazu =

Ghanaian politician

Abdul Rauf Tongym Tubazu is a Ghanaian politician and a member of the National Democratic Congress (NDC). He represents Ayawaso Central constituency in the parliament of the republic of Ghana.

== Early life and education ==
Tubazu was born on 28 September 1983. He hails from Bawku/ walewale in Upper East Region of Ghana.
