= 2007 Nigerian Senate election in the Federal Capital Territory =

2007 Nigerian Senate election in Federal Capital Territory

The 2007 Nigerian Senate election in Federal Capital Territory was held on 21 April 2007, to elect a member of the Nigerian Senate to represent Federal Capital Territory. Usman Jibrin Wowo representing FCT Senatorial District won on the platform of the All Nigeria Peoples Party.

== Overview ==
Affiliation	Party		Total
Affiliation	PDP	ANPP	Total
Before Election			1
After Election	0	1	1

== Summary ==
District	Incumbent	Party	Elected Senator	Party
FCT Senatorial District			Usman Jibrin Wowo	ANPP

== Results ==
=== FCT Senatorial District ===
The election was won by Usman Jibrin Wowo of the All Nigeria Peoples Party.

2007 Nigerian Senate election in Federal Capital Territory
Party	Candidate	Votes	%
ANPP	Usman Jibrin Wowo		
Total votes			
ANPP hold			
