= Adomas =

Adomas is a Lithuanian language given name, the Lithuanized form of the name Adam. Notable people known under this name include:

- Pranas Končius (code name Adomas; died 1965), last anti-Soviet Lithuanian partisan killed in action
- Icikas Meskupas (pseudonym Adomas; 1907–1942), leader of the Lithuanian Komsomol and Communist Party in interwar Lithuania
- Adomas Drungilas (born 1990), Lithuanian professional basketball player
- Adomas Galdikas (1893–1969), Lithuanian painter, graphic artist, and scenographer
- Adomas Šernas (1884–1965), Lithuanian Calvinist priest
- Adomas Varnas (1879–1979), Lithuanian painter, photographer, collector, philanthropist, and educator
