= Suleiman Adamu =

Nigerian politician (1963–2020)

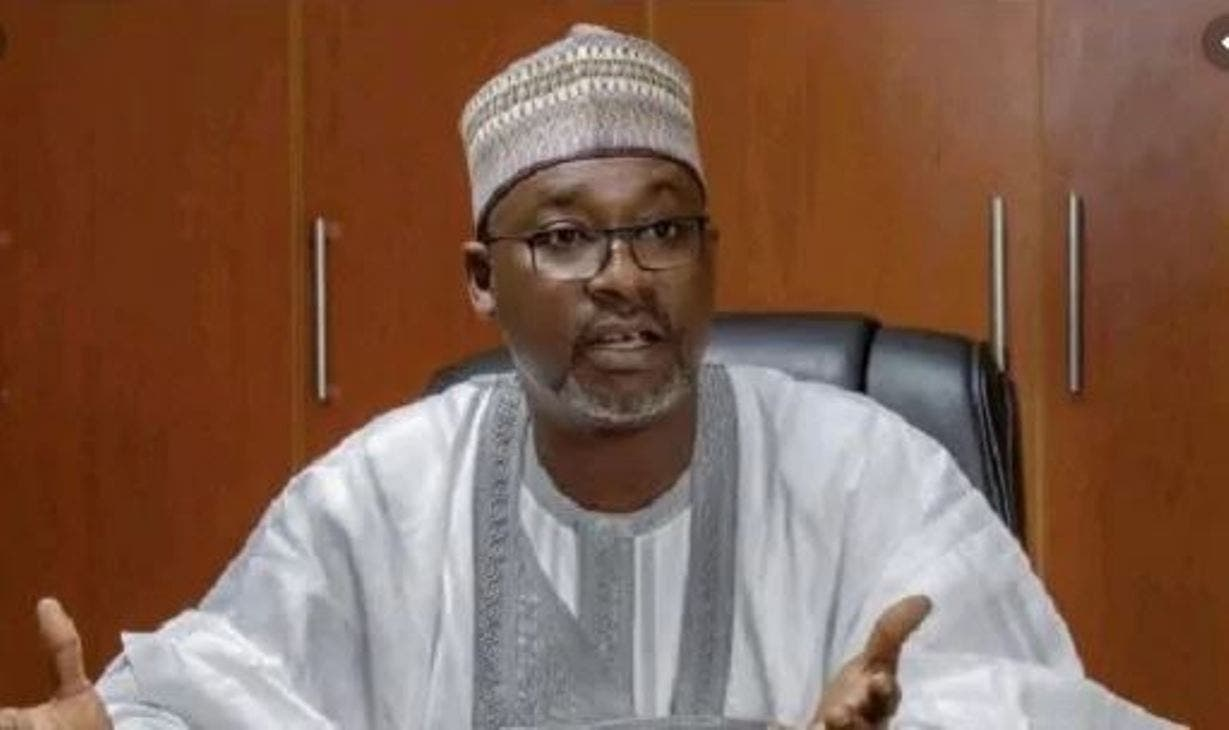
Suleiman Adamu

Suleiman Adamu ( - 30 April 2020) was a Nigerian politician.

He was serving as a member of the Nasarawa State House of Assembly, representing Nasarawa Central constituency, at the time of his death due to COVID-19 in April 2020.

== Death ==
Suleiman Adamu died from COVID-19 at Federal Medical Centre (FMC) in Keffi, Nasarawa State, Nigeria, on 30 April 2020. He was buried on 1 May in his hometown, Nasarawa. His test results, which were not completed until after he died, confirmed COVID-19.

Adamu was the first recorded fatality from COVID-19 in Nasarawa State during the COVID-19 pandemic in Nigeria.

In response to his death, the state government closed the Nasarawa State House of Assembly building for decontamination and imposed a lockdown on Suleiman Adamu's hometown of Nasarawa to slow the spread of COVID-19.
