= Henry Quartey =

Ghanaian politician

Hon. Henry Quartey MP
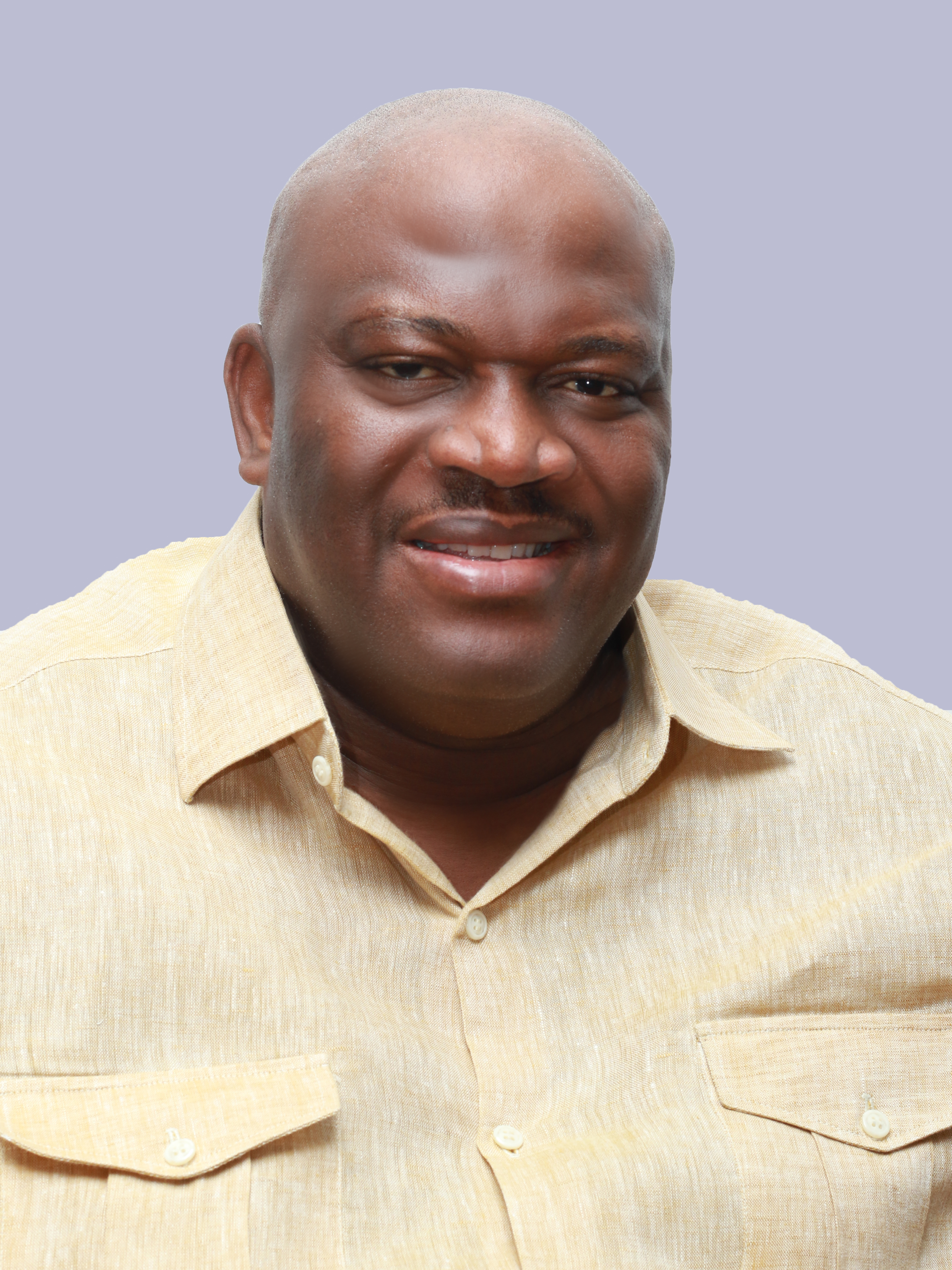

Member of the Ghana Parliament for Ayawaso Central Constituency
- Incumbent
- Assumed office 7 January 2017

Personal details
- Born: 12 March 1971 (age 55) Otublohum, Accra
- Party: New Patriotic Party
- Education: GIMPA
- Occupation: Politician
- Committees: Roads and Transport Committee; Appointments Committee

Henry Quartey (born 12 March 1971) is a Ghanaian politician and member of the Seventh Parliament of the Fourth Republic of Ghana representing the Ayawaso Central Constituency in the Greater Accra Region on the ticket of the New Patriotic Party. He served as the Minister for Greater Accra Region. On 14 February 2024, he was approved as the minister of the interior of Ghana replacing Ambrose Dery.

== Early life and education ==
Quartey was born on 12 March 1971. He hails from Otublohum-Accra, a town in the Greater Accra Region of Ghana. He had his secondary educations at the Hams Secondary School in Dansoman and Zams Secondary/Technical School in Bolgatanga. He had his G.C.E. O'level at Osu Presbyterian Senior High School. He entered Ghana Institute of Management and Public Administration and obtained his postgraduate certificate in Public Administration.

== Politics ==
Quartey is a member of the New Patriotic Party (NPP). In 2012, he contested for the Ayawaso Central seat on the ticket of the NPP sixth parliament of the fourth republic and won. He was a member of the Roads and Transport Committee as well as Gender and Children Committee. He also represented his constituency at Seventh Parliament of the Fourth Republic of Ghana. He defeated Abdul Rauf Tubazu with 33,002 who lost with 28,363.

=== Committees ===
Quartey is a member of Roads and Transport Committee and also a member of the Appointments Committee.

== Career ==
He was the CEO of Krafty Hospitality Services Limited in Accra from 2003 to date. He was also the Sales and Marketing Manager of B.B.C Trading from 1992 to 1996. He later became the Regional Director of Dalebrook Company Limited from 1997 to 1998. He was also the Sales Manager and Director of Pecoll Aluminium Systems from 1995 to 2000. He was the Deputy Minister for Interior. He was the Deputy Minister for National Security. He is currently the Greater Accra Regional Minister.

== Personal life ==
Quartey is a Christian. He is married to Sybil Ansah Quartey with six children.

== Philanthropy ==
In September 2021, Quartey pledged to support Psalm Adjeteyfio with a monthly stipend of GH¢1,500. Quartey claimed he was inspired by Psalm's impact in the film and entertainment industry in Ghana, hence the pledge.
