= Abubakar Adamu Mohamed =

Nigerian footballer (born 1997)

Adamu Mohamed
Personal information
- Full name: Abubakar Adamu Mohamed
- Date of birth: 15 October 1997 (age 29)
- Place of birth: Gombe, Nigeria
- Height: 1.86 m (6 ft 1 in)
- Position: Goalkeeper

Team information
- Current team: Wikki Tourists F.C.
- Number: 22

Senior career*
Years	Team	Apps	(Gls)
2015–2018	Shooting Stars S.C.		
2018–2019	El-Kanemi Warriors F.C.		
2019–2020	Wikki Tourists F.C.		
2021–2022	Katsina United F.C.		

International career
2012	Nigeria U-17	0	(0)
2015	Nigeria U-20	0	(0)
2019–	Nigeria U-23	6	(0)
- * Club domestic league appearances and goals

Abubakar Adamu Mohamed (born 15 October 1997) is a Nigerian professional footballer who plays as a goalkeeper for Wikki Tourists F.C.
