= Adamu Tafawa Balewa College of Education =

College of education in Bauchi, Nigeria

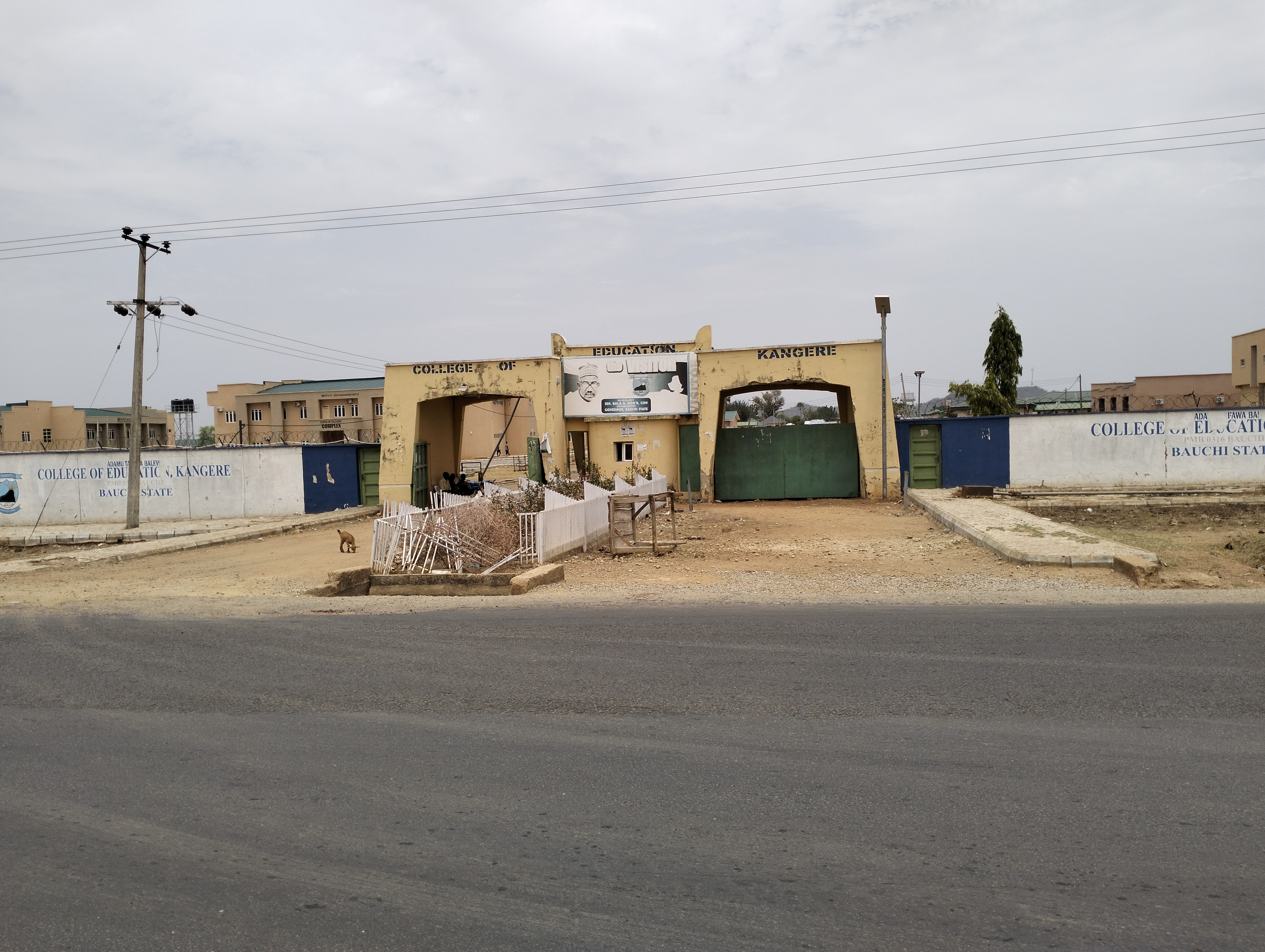
- Adamu Tafawa Balewa College of Education Kangere
- Type: Public
- Established: 2014
- Provost: Dr Dauda Sanda Buteh
- Location: Kangere, Bauchi State, Nigeria; 10°15′43.2″N 9°59′59.6″E
- Website: coekangere.edu.ng

The Adamu Tafawa Balewa College of Education is a state-owned tertiary institution located in Kangere, along Bauchi Gombe road, Bauchi State, Nigeria. The current provost is Dr. Dauda Buteh Sanda.

== History ==
The Adamu Tafawa Balewa College of Education was established in 2014. It was formerly known as Bauchi State Institute ADAMU TAFAWA BALEWA COLLEGE OF EDUCATION KANGERE.

== Courses ==
The institution offers the following courses;

- Home Economics
- Business Education
- Agricultural Science Education
- Islamic Religion Studies
- Education and Arabic
- Economics
- Early Childhood and Primary Education
- Education and English
- Hausa
- Physical and Health Education
- French
- Physics Education
- Geography
- Chemistry Education
- Biology Education
- Adult and Non-Formal Education
- Mathematics
- Management Studies
- Computer Science Education
- Social Development
- Integrated Science Education
- Social Studies Double Major
- Nomadic Education
- Christian Religious Studies
- English / Social Studies
