= Federal Capital Territory senatorial district =

The Federal Capital Territory senatorial district in Federal Capital Territory, Nigeria covers 6 local governments which include: Abuja, Abaji, Kwali, Bwari, Gwagwalada and Kuje. FCT senate district has within its territory Nigeria's seat of power (Aso Rock Presidential Villa, the National Assembly and Judicial headquarters). Ireti Kingibe is the current representative of FCT senatorial district.

== List of senators representing FCT ==
Senator	Party	Year	Assembly	Electoral history
Khairat Abdulrazaq-Gwadabe	PDP	1999–2003	4th	
Isa Maina	PDP	2003–2007	5th	
Adamu Sidi Ali	PDP	2007–2011	6th	
Philips Tanimu Aduda	PDP	2011–2023	7th 8th 9th	
Ireti Kingibe	LP	2023–present	10th	
