= Asawase (Ghana parliament constituency) =

Constituency in the Ashanti Region of Ghana

- constituency for the Parliament of Ghana
- District: Kumasi Metropolitan District
- Region: Ashanti Region of Ghana

Current constituency
- Created: 2004
- Party: National Democratic Congress
- MP: Muntaka Mohammed Mubarak

Asawase is one of the constituencies represented in the Parliament of Ghana. It elects one Member of Parliament (MP) by the first past the post system of election, Asawase is famous for being a stronghold for NDC in the Ashanti Region. Asawase is located in the Kumasi Metropolitan district of the Ashanti Region of Ghana.

This seat was created prior to the Ghanaian parliamentary election in 2004 and has since been held by the National Democratic Congress. It is one of the hottest seats in the Ashanti Region and as such elections on there are keenly contested. The current member of parliament for the Asawase Constituency is Hon Muntaka Mohammed Mubarak a leading member in the NDC.

== Boundaries ==
The seat is located within the Kumasi Metropolitan District of the Ashanti Region of Ghana.

== History ==
The constituency was formed in 2004 by the Electoral Commission of Ghana along with 29 other new ones, increasing the number of constituencies from 200 to 230. The Asokwa East and Asokwa West constituencies were realigned, forming the Asawase (Asokwa) constituency and the new Oforikrom constituency.

== Members of parliament ==
Election	Member	Party
2004	Constituency created	
2004	Gibril Adamu Mohammed	National Democratic Congress
2005	Muntaka Mohammed Mubarak	National Democratic Congress

== Elections ==
2008 Ghanaian parliamentary election: Asawase Source:Ghana Home Page
Party	Candidate	Votes	%	±%
National Democratic Congress	Muntaka Mohammed Mubarak	36,234	56.6	−3.8
New Patriotic Party	Mohammed Abdul Kabir	27,118	42.4	+3.7
People's National Convention	Elyasu Mohammed	369	0.6	−0.2
Convention People's Party	Alhaji Baba Musah	262	0.4	N/A
Democratic Freedom Party	Mohammed Bashir Tijani	0	0	N/A
Majority		9,116	14.2	−7.5

- A by-election was held following the death of the incumbent MP, Dr. Gibril. Muntaka Mohammed Mubarak won with a majority of 11,142 replacing the late Dr Gibrine also of the NDC who had won the seat in December 2004 with a majority of 4,474. The Ghana Center for Democratic Development deemed that this by-election was "fair and transparent, but not free from fear." He subsequently retained his seat in the Ghanaian parliamentary election held in December 2008.

Asawase By-election, 2005 Source:Ghana Home Page
Party	Candidate	Votes	%	±%
National Democratic Congress	Muntaka Mohammed Mubarak	31,017	60.4	+10.7
New Patriotic Party	Shuaibu Musah Sharif	19,875	38.7	−4.4
People's National Convention	Ibrahim Mohammed Issaka	417	0.8	−1.6
Majority		11,142	21.7	+15.1
Turnout		51,635	64.29	

2004 Ghanaian parliamentary election: Asawase Source:Ghana Home Page
Party	Candidate	Votes	%	±%
National Democratic Congress	Gibril Adamu Mohammed	33,541	49.7	N/A
New Patriotic Party	Patrick Appiagyei	29,067	43.1	N/A
Independent	Abdul Majeed Alhassan	2,505	3.7	N/A
People's National Convention	Thomas Tangwanse Atigah	1,598	2.4	N/A
Convention People's Party	King Hassan Abu Bong	570	0.8	N/A
Democratic People's Party (Ghana)	Adam Diyawu Rahman	204	0.3	N/A
Majority		4,474	6.6	N/A

== See also ==
- List of Ghana Parliament constituencies
