= Zephaniah Jisalo =

Nigerian politician

Zephaniah Bitrus Jisalo (born 3 April 1970), is a Nigerian politician. He is currently serving as the Minister of Special Duties and Inter-Governmental Affairs.

== Career ==
In 2011, Jisalo was elected to the Federal House of Representatives, representing the Abuja Municipal/Bwari Constituency. In 2023, he was appointed by President Bola Tinubu as the Minister of Special Duties and Inter-Governmental Affairs.
