= Adămuș =

Adămuș Ádámos
- Commune
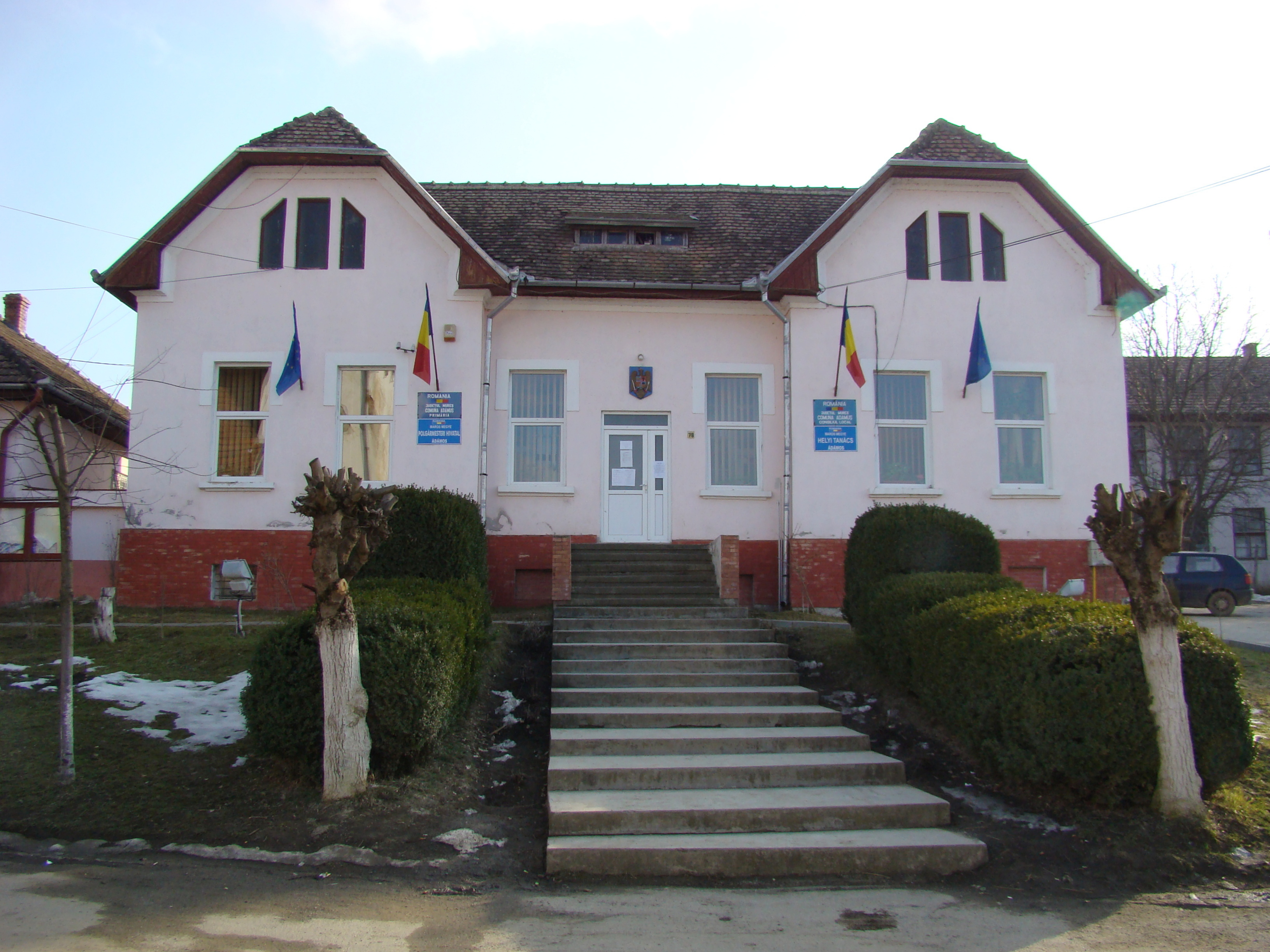
- Adămuș town hall

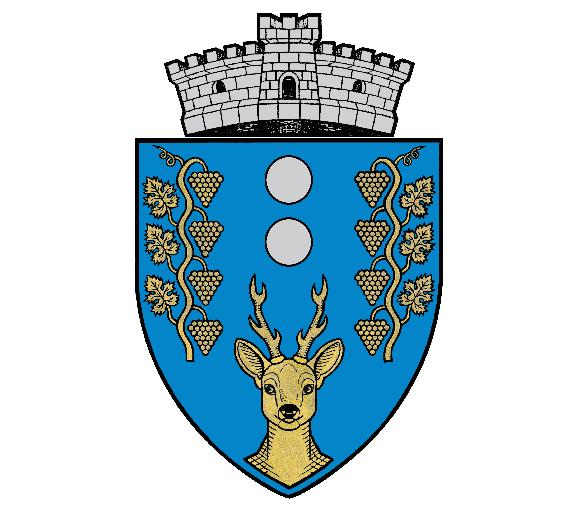
- Coat of arms

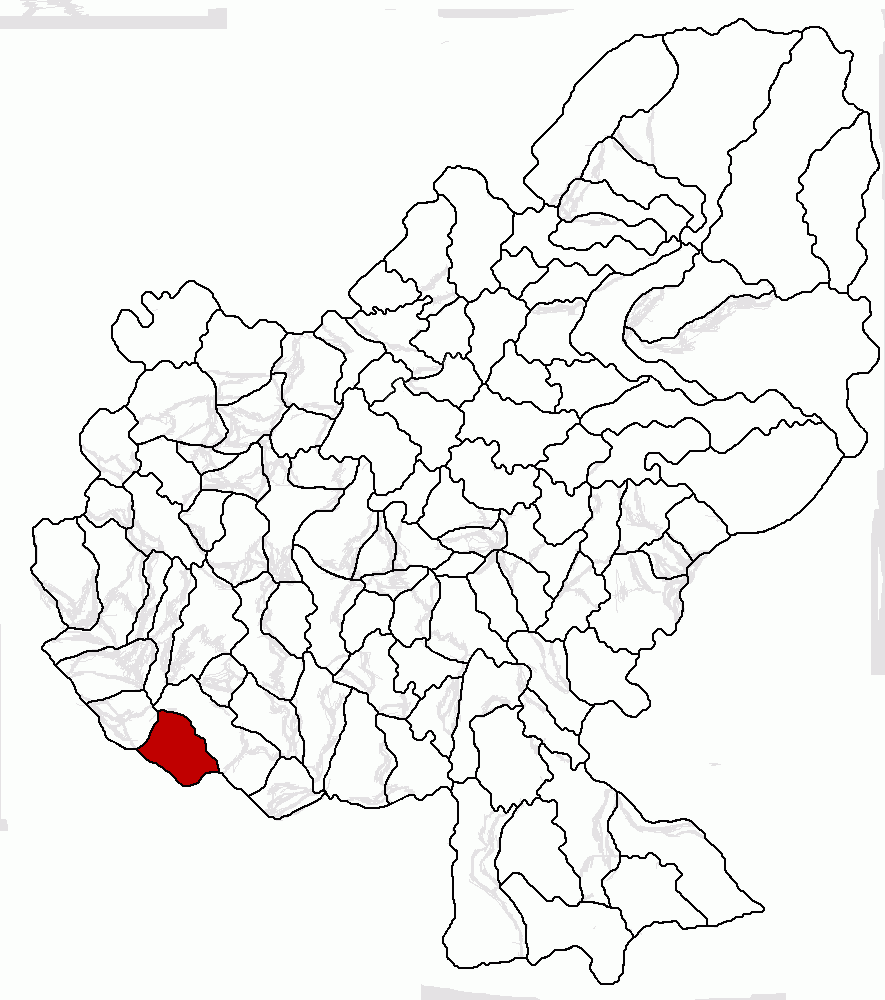
- Location in Mureș County

- Location in Romania
- Coordinates: 46°18′N 24°14′E
- Country: Romania
- County: Mureș

Government
  - Mayor (2020–2024): Tibor-Laszlo Miklos (UDMR)
- Area: 82.35 km^{2} (31.80 sq mi)
- Elevation: 290 m (950 ft)
- Population (2021-12-01): 4,993
  - Density: 60.63/km^{2} (157.0/sq mi)
- Time zone: UTC+02:00 (EET)
  - Summer (DST): UTC+03:00 (EEST)
- Postal code: 547015
- Area code: +(40) 265
- Vehicle reg.: MS
- Website: primariaadamus.ro

Adămuș (Hungarian: Ádámos; Hungarian pronunciation: [ˈaːdaːmoʃ]) is a commune in Mureș County, Transylvania, Romania. It is composed of six villages: Adămuș, Chinciuș (Kincses), Cornești (Sövényfalva), Crăiești (Magyarkirályfalva), Dâmbău (Küküllődombó; German: Hügeldorf), and Herepea (Magyarherepe).

== Geography ==
The commune is situated on the Transylvanian Plateau, on the left bank of the river Târnava Mică. It is located in the southwestern part of the county, on the border with Alba County and near the border with Sibiu County. Adămuș is at a distance of 6.5 km (4 mi) from Târnăveni, 28 km (17 mi) from Mediaș, and 43 km (27 mi) from the county seat, Târgu Mureș.

== History ==
Until 1918, the village belonged to the Kis-Küküllő County of the Kingdom of Hungary. After the Hungarian–Romanian War of 1918–19 and the Treaty of Trianon of 1920, it became part of Romania.

== Demographics ==
Historical population
Year	Pop.	±%
1850	5,216	—
1880	5,003	−4.1%
1900	5,926	+18.4%
1910	6,549	+10.5%
1930	6,773	+3.4%
1956	7,445	+9.9%
1966	7,785	+4.6%
1977	7,373	−5.3%
1992	6,084	−17.5%
2002	5,966	−1.9%
2011	5,147	−13.7%
2021	4,993	−3.0%
Source: Census data

According to the 2011 census, Adămuș has a population of 5,147, of which 43.46% were Romanians, 38.47% Hungarians, and 14.96% Roma. At the 2021 census, the commune had a population of 4,993; of those, 43.6% were Romanians, 31% Hungarians, and 21.03% Roma.

== Natives ==
- László Hunyadi (born 1933), sculptor
- Jenő Korodi (born 1922), painter
- Lajos Ütő (1885–1977), pastor

== See also ==
- List of Hungarian exonyms (Mureș County)
- Unitarian church from Adămuș
- Wooden church from Chinciuș
- Wooden church from Dâmbău
