= Mustapha Adamu Animashaun =

Nigerian astrologer and fortune teller

Adamu Animashaun
- Born: 1885; Kano, Nigeria
- Died: 1968 (aged 82–83); Lagos, Nigeria
- Occupations: Businessman and editor
- Writing career
- Genre: Islam
- Subject: Islamic History
- Literary movement: Islamic

Mustapha Adamu Animashaun (1885–1968) was a prominent Lagos Islamic leader in the first half of the twentieth century. He was also an author, fortune teller, publisher and political leader. He was involved in various progressive movements and controversial issues in the Islamic community in Lagos for most of the first half of the twentieth century, when the Muslims then constituted about half of the Lagos population. His major influence was also his master, a prominent Lagos Muslim, Idris Animashaun.

As a religious leader, he promoted the adoption of Western education among Muslims and sought the enactment of a constitution for the Lagos Central Mosque and the general Lagos Muslim community. However, the agitation for the latter led to some conflicts with fellow Muslims in Lagos.

== Early life ==
Animashaun was born as a freeman in the ancient city of Kano. The name of his father was Usman, while his mother was the daughter of the Chief Imam of Kano, Mallam Ibrahim. At the early age of eight, he lost his status as a freeman when he was captured as a slave, during a turbulent time in Kano. He was then sold to the palace of the Emir of Zazzau and was trained by the emir's son. As a steward in the Emir's palace, he was afforded the opportunity to travel to a few Northern Nigerian cities, he also lived in Cairo for five years. However, his search for freedom soon hit the rocks; while returning from Egypt, he was captured again and re-sold as a slave to the Waziri of Sokoto. He later left the Islamic city of Sokoto for Ilorin with a Sokoto man, Mallam Madugu. In Ilorin, he was sold to Alfa (cleric) Bello of Agbaji quarters, an Islamic center of renowned scholarship. While in Ilorin, he was raised and taught in the Islamic way; he also chose the name Adamu, a popular name at the time and was also quite popular among his peers. He was finally sold to his last master, Idris Animashaun, the head of a government Muslim school in Lagos. He enrolled in the Muslim school in 1896, where he was able to apply the Arabic and astrology knowledge he had learned in Egypt and Ilorin. His experience in the school was quite a success, he only spent two years in the school as he was already an astute and literate man well versed in Islamic knowledge which was the major vocal point of the Lagos Islamic School.

== Career ==
=== Shop manager ===
After completing his studies, he apprenticed under his tutor and master, Idris Animashaun as an assistant Shop keeper. He later became the manager of the shop in 1912. During the same year, he was given a certificate of freedom and he became a freeman. He then followed his mentor's foot step and opened a shop in 1913, the shop specialised in selling Arabic books on Shitta street, Lagos. By the time, he had begun to assimilate into the elite Muslim community of Lagos, due in part to the influence of Idris Animashaun. He married, the daughter of the Chief Imam of Lagos, the cleric Ibrahim.

=== Publisher and author ===
To complement the services offered in his store, he opened a small printing business in 1914. The business was involved in printing Islamic related posters and notices. He also used the business to print his version of a Nigerian almanac. He used his astrology knowledge to predict events for individual clients who came to his office, while he gained popularity as a fortune teller due in large part to his knowledge of the Arabic language and astrology which was quite high in relation to many residents of Lagos. However, his style of prediction mostly used and extrapolated from world and local events and societal issues.

In 1918, he acquired the Lagos Central Times from Mr Davies. The Times was established three and a half years earlier. He bought the paper after negative news generated as a result of a crisis in the Lagos Central Mosque. The paper was later financed by the Muslim community up to 1924. The Lagos crisis was between the Chief Imam, who had reneged on an earlier agreement to sign a constitution for the Lagos Muslim community while the members of the mosque, led by Animashaun had campaigned for rules and regulations for the central mosque. The crisis induced bad publicity for the Muslim community in the local press. To avail on what he felt was a propensity to inadequate reporting from the mainstream Lagos press on the Muslim community. He bought and became for a short time, the editor of the newspaper. He was quite successful, as the newspaper grew rapidly in its early years. As the publisher of the newspaper, he began to use the medium for his personal views on many issues, including a controversial Islamic group, the Ahmadiyya society. His influence among the community began to grow, so also did his opposition, including opposition from the Ahmadi's.

In 1937, he published a pamphlet on the History of Islam in Lagos. The book detailed the history of Imams of the central mosque and became an authoritative source on the timeline of Imams in Lagos. The book also expanded on major developments in the Lagos community from 1770 to the 1920s.

== Promoting education ==
Animashaun was a well read man and he wanted to improve the educational facilities available to Muslims in Lagos. From most indications he was a bibliophile, and well versed in the rudimentary of economics, Nigerian politics and Islamic studies and established a Muslim training school in Lagos. The school dealt mostly with literacy, as primary subjects where Arabic and English language. This approach to spreading education was soon followed by the Ahmadiyya movement and the Ansaruddeen society. A desired goal of his was to educate Muslim children to be employed as clerical workers in the Colonial Service.

== Later life ==
Animashaun left the heart of Lagos for Mushin, a district of the larger Lagos State in the 1930s. He later became the Seriki of Mushin, (leader of Mushin Muslims) and was a founding member of the United Muslim Party in 1953.
