= Gibril Adamu Mohammed =

Ghanaian politician

Hon. Gibril Adamu Mohammed

Member of Parliament for Asawase Constituency
- In office 7 January 2005 – 6 January 2009
- President: John Kufuor

Personal details
- Born: 1961
- Died: 15 February 2005
- Party: National Democratic Congress
- Occupation: Medical Doctor

Gibril Adamu Mohammed was a Ghanaian politician of the Republic of Ghana. He was the Member of Parliament representing Asawase constituency of the Ashanti Region of Ghana in the 4th Parliament of the 4th Republic of Ghana. He was a member of the National Democratic Congress.

== Career ==
Mohammed was a medical doctor by profession.

== Political career ==
Mohammed was a member of the National Democratic Congress. He became a member of parliament from January 2005 after emerging winner in the General Election in December 2004. He was elected as the member of parliament for the Asawase constituency in the fourth parliament of the fourth Republic of Ghana.

== Elections ==
Mohammed was elected as the member of parliament for the Asawase constituency of the Ashanti Region of Ghana for the first time in the 2004 Ghanaian general elections. He won on the ticket of the National Democratic Congress. His constituency was a part of the three parliamentary seats out of 39 seats won by the National Democratic Congress in that election for the Ashanti Region. The National Democratic Congress won a minority total of 94 parliamentary seats out of 230 seats. He was elected with 33,541 votes out of 67,485 total valid votes cast. This was equivalent to 49.7% of total valid votes cast. He was elected over Thomas Atigah of the People's National Convention, Patricia Appiagyei of the New Patriotic Party, Hassan B. A. Abu-Bong of the Convention People's Party, Adam Diyawu Rahaman of the Democratic People's Party and Abdul Majeed Alhassan an independent candidate. These obtained 1,598, 29,067, 570, 204 and 2,505 votes respectively of total votes cast. These were equivalent to 2.4%, 43.1%, 0.8%, 0.3% and 3.7% respectively of total valid votes cast.

== Personal life ==
Mohammed was a Muslim.

== Death ==
Mohammed died shortly after winning the parliamentary seat for Asawase constituency on 15 February 2005.

== See also ==
- List of MPs elected in the 2004 Ghanaian parliamentary election
