= Adamu Sidi Ali =

Nigerian politician

Sen Adamu Sidi-Ali

Senator of the Federal Republic of Nigeria from FCT, Abuja
- In office 2009–2011
- Preceded by: Isah Maina
- Succeeded by: Philips Tanimu Aduda
- Constituency: Abuja, FCT

Personal details
- Born: 14 May 1952 (age 74) Abaji, FCT, Nigeria
- Party: All Progressive Congress (APC)
- Occupation: Farming
- Profession: Politician

Adamu Muhammad Sidi-Ali (born 14 May 1952) is a Nigerian politician and farmer. He has run successfully for the offices of Chairman (Abaji Area council) and for the House of Representatives beginning in the early 2000s. In December 2014, he emerged again as the Senatorial Candidate of the All Progressives Congress for the 2015 elections. He is a native of Abaji Area Council in the Federal Capital Territory.

== Background ==
Sidi Ali was born in May 1952. He obtained a B.A in Public Administration from Ahmadu Bello University, Zaria. Before entering politics, Sidi Ali was a journalist. He was elected Chairman of the Abaji Area Council for two terms.

In April 2003, Sidi Ali was the All Nigeria Peoples Party (ANPP) candidate for the House of Representatives of Nigeria for Abuja South Federal Constituency, covering the Gwagwalada, Kuje, Kwali and Abuja area councils. The election was marred by reports of vote rigging, bribery and other irregularities. His election was confirmed after an initial result that gave victory to the rival PDP candidate was appealed since some ballots had not been included in the count. In turn, the PDP appealed the decision to nullify the election of their candidate, who had died two months after the election, saying the election should be a re-run due to his death. Their appeal was rejected.

Later, Sidi Ali changed allegiance to the Peoples Democratic Party (PDP). During a PDP campaign flag-off meeting before the April 2007 elections, he advised political opponents not to use thugs to destabilize the elections.

== Senate career ==
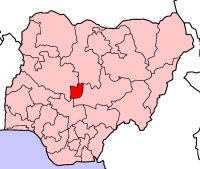
Federal Capital Territory, Nigeria

Sidi Ali became senator for the FCT following a re-run election in 2008.

In May 2008, Sidi Ali was named a member of the National Assembly Joint Committee on Constitution Review (JCCR). In June 2008, he accompanied Senator John Nanzip Shagaya on a tour of the Bonny naval base, and heard an appeal for more gun boats to police the waterways and to curb piracy. In an August 2008 interview, Senator Sidi Ali expressed confidence that the Senate and executive were handling budgetary issues more effectively, and that the judiciary was performing well in dealing with decisions from election tribunals. In June 2009, Senator Sidi-Ali announced a scholarship program for indigent FCT students who were studying science at tertiary institutions.

Senator Sidi-Ali sponsored the following bills:

- A bill for an act to provide for rent control in the Federal Capital Territory and Other Related Matters (2010) SB410
- A bill for an act to provide for the administrative and political structure of Area councils in the Federal Capital Territory and For Other Related Matters.
- Federal Capital Territory Re-settlement, Compensation and Rehabilitation Board (Establishment etc. Bill 2010) SB409
- A bill for an act to provide for the establishment of the Federal Capital Territory University of Science and Technology, Abaji, and for Related matters (2010) SB401.
