= Adamu Mohammed =

Ghanaian football defender (born 1983)

Personal information
- Full name: Adamu Mohamed
- Date of birth: July 24, 1983 (age 43)
- Place of birth: Accra, Ghana
- Position: Defender

Senior career*
Years	Team	Apps	(Gls)
–2006	Real Sportive		
2006–2008	Asante Kotoko		
2008	Gençlerbirliği S.K.	11	(0)
2008–2009	→ Hacettepespor (loan)	2	(0)
2008–2009	→ KS Vllaznia (loan)	1	(0)
2009	→ Tema Youth (loan)		
2009–2010	Eleven Wise		
2010–	Hapoel Be'er Sheva	9	(0)
- * Club domestic league appearances and goals as of May 16, 2010

Adamu Mohammed (born July 24, 1983, in Accra) is a Ghanaian football defender.

== Club career ==
Mohammed is a tall defender who was signed in 2006 by Asante Kotoko from Real Sportive. In July 2008, he moved to Gençlerbirliği S.K. for a club record transfer fee of €4.5 million. In 2008, he went to Hacettepespor and in late 2008 he was loaned to KS Vllaznia Shkodër in Albania. In January 2009, he left Macedonia to sign with Tema Youth on loan from Hacettepespor and in September 2009 was sold to Eleven Wise. In 2010, he played for Hapoel Be'er Sheva.

== International career ==
Mohammed was part of the Ghana national under-23 side that won bronze at the 203 All-African Games in Abuja.
