= Khairat Abdulrazaq-Gwadabe =

Nigerian politician

Senator for Abuja FCT
- In office 29 May 1999 – 29 May 2003
- Succeeded by: Isah Maina

Personal details
- Born: April 1957 (age 69) Ilorin, Kwara State, Nigeria
- Education: University of Buckingham

Khairat Abdulrazaq-Gwadabe was in born 1957. She is a Nigerian Lawyer and politician. Khairat was elected as the Senator for the Abuja Federal Capital Territory constituency, Nigeria at the start of the Nigerian Fourth Republic, running on the People's Democratic Party (PDP) platform. She held office from May 1999 to May 2003.

Khairat Abdulrazaq-Gwadabe is the sister of Governor AbdulRahman AbdulRazaq and wife of Colonel Lawan Gwadabe, a former military governor of Niger State. She was born in Ilorin on April 23, 1957. She studied law at the University of Buckingham. After taking her seat in the Senate, she was appointed to committees on the Environment, Health, Women Affairs (chairman), Federal Character, Tourism and Culture and Federal Capital Territory. She was also a member of the Panel of Review of Nigeria Customs and Excise.

Khairat Abdulrazaq-Gwadabe was a contender to be PDP candidate for her senate seat in 2003, but lost in the primaries. This may have been due to her previous support for a move to impeach President Olusegun Obasanjo. In January 2003, she announced her decision to defect to the All Nigeria People's Party (ANPP) due to unfair treatment by the PDP.

In August 2005, six years after marriage, Khairat Abdulrazaq-Gwadabe gave birth to her first child, a boy, at a hospital in Miami, Florida, US. She was aged 48. The father of the new baby, Colonel Lawan Gwadabe, a former military governor of Niger State. As of December 2011, Khairat Abdulrazaq-Gwadabe was the chairman of the Senators Forum, through which former and serving senators share their knowledge and experience.
