= Philip Aduda =

Nigerian politician

Philips Aduda CON
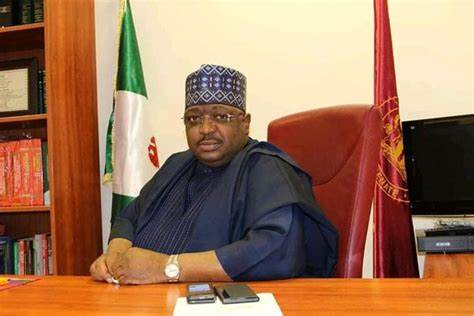

Senator for FCT
- In office 6 June 2011 – 11 June 2023
- Preceded by: Adamu Sidi Ali
- Succeeded by: Ireti Kingibe

Personal details
- Born: Philips Tanimu Aduda Karu, FCT, Nigeria
- Party: People's Democratic Party

Philips Tanimu Aduda CON is a Nigerian politician. He served two terms in the Nigerian House of Representatives between 2003 and 2011, and was elected to the Senate for the Abuja Federal Capital Territory in the 9 April 2011 elections, running on the People's Democratic Party (PDP) ticket.

== Background ==
Aduda was born in Karu, FCT Abuja. He attended Government Secondary School, Gwagwalada (1983–1987) and Kaduna Polytechnic (1987–1990) for his secondary education. Studying at the University of Jos (1990–1992) he gained a Diploma in Social works and social development. He was a Managing Director of Aduda Nigeria Limited from 1992 to 1995. At the Federal Polytechnic, Bida, Abuja Campus (1993–1997) he gained a Higher Diploma in Public Administration. His brother, Gabriel Aduda is also a Federal Permanent Secretary.

== Political career ==
In 1996, Aduda ran as an independent and was elected a Councilor of Karu Ward, Abuja, and held various positions on the Abuja Municipal Area Council. He was elected as Member of the House of Representatives for AMAC/Bwara in Abuja (2003–2007), and was appointed Chairman, of the House committee on Federal Capital Territory, and member of other committees. He was re-elected to representing Bwari Area, Abuja in the House of Representatives in 2008. In October 2009, he was given the Best Performing Legislator Award for his contribution to the development of the people.

Before the 9 April 2011 elections, the Federal Capital Integrity Group and other NGOs declared their support for the candidature of Aduda for the FCT Senate seat. Two days before the election, the Labour Party candidate Kayode Ajulo was abducted by gunmen. In the elections, Aduda won 105,562 votes. His main remaining opponent, Musa Tanko Abari of the Congress for Progressive Change (CPC), scored 54,307. After his swearing in, he was appointed Chairman Senate Committee on Power.

On 28 March 2015 he was re-elected into the Nigerian Senate for a second term representing Federal Capital Territory. After re-election, his opponent Sani Sidi sued Aduda to the Election Petition Tribunal on grounds of election malpractices but the case was struck out and Adudua was announced legitimate winner of the election. In 2017, he was appointed Senate Miniority Whip.

On 26 February 2019, he was re-elected for a third term into the Nigerian senate. Aduda won with the total vote of 263,055.

== Awards ==
Aduda holds the National Honours of the Commander of the Order of the Niger (CON).
