= List of female members of the Seventh Parliament of the Fourth Republic of Ghana =

This is a list of women who have been elected as member of the Seventh Parliament of the Fourth Republic of Ghana.

== Lists ==
Name	Constituency	Party	Regions
Tina Gifty Naa Ayeley Mensah	Weija Gbawe	NPP	Greater Accra
Sophia Karen Ackuaku	Domeabra/Obom	NDC	Greater Accra
Shirley Ayorkor Botchwey	Anyaa Sowutuom	NPP	Greater Accra
Sarah Adwoa Sarfo	Dome Kwabenya	NPP	Greater Accra
Sheila Bartels	Ablekuma North	NPP	Greater Accra
Ursula Owusu	Ablekuma West	NPP	Greater Accra
Zanetor Agyeman Rawlings	Klottey Korle	NDC	Greater Accra
Elizabeth Afoley Quaye	Krowor	NPP	Greater Accra
Linda Obenewaa Akweley Ocloo	Shai Osudoku	NDC	Greater Accra
Cudjoe Comfort Doyoe	Ada	NDC	Greater Accra
Nana Dokua Asiamah Adjei	Akropong	NPP	Eastern Region
Adu Gyamfi Mercy	Akwatia	NPP	Eastern Region
Gifty Twum-Ampofo	Abuakwa North	NPP	Eastern Region
Abena Osei-Asare	Atiwa East	NPP	Eastern Region
Mensah Betty Nana Efua Krosby	Afram Plains North	NDC	Eastern Region
Barbara Asher Ayisi	Cape Coast North	NPP	Central Region
Naana Eyiah	Gomoa Central	NPP	Central Region
Mavis Hawa Koomson	Awutu Senya East	NPP	Central Region
Cynthia Mamle Morrison	Agona West	NPP	Central Region
Queenstar Pokuah Sawyerr	Agona East	NDC	Central Region
Abena Durowaa Mensah	Assin North	NPP	Central Region
Joycelyn Tetteh	North Dayi	NDC	Volta Region
Della Sowah	Kpando	NDC	Volta Region
Bernice Adiku Heloo	Hohoe	NDC	Volta Region
Angela Oforiwa Alorwu-Tay	Afadzato South	NDC	Volta Region
Helen Adjoa Ntoso	Krachi West	NDC	Volta Region
Catherine Abelema Afeku	Evalue Ajomoro Gwira	NPP	Western Region
Barbara Oteng-Gyasi	Prestea Huni Valley	NPP	Western Region
Ayamba Laadi Ayi	Pusiga	NDC	Upper East Region
Joyce Adwoa Akoh	Bosome Freho	NPP	Ashanti Region
Patricia Appiagyei	Asokwa	NPP	Ashanti Region
Francisca Oteng Mensah	Kwabre East	NPP	Ashanti Region
Ama Pomaa Boateng	Juaben	NPP	Ashanti Region
Freda Prempeh,	Tano North	NPP	Brong Ahafo Region

== See also ==
- List of female members of the Eighth Parliament of the Fourth Republic of Ghana
