= List of female members of the Eighth Parliament of the Fourth Republic of Ghana =

This is a list of women who have been elected as member of the Eighth Parliament of the Fourth Republic of Ghana. Within the 8th parliament, the National Democratic Congress and the New Patriotic Party both have 20 female members each making a total of 40 out 275 being females.

== Lists ==
	Name	Constituency	Party	Regions
1	Tina Gifty Naa Ayeley Mensah	Weija Gbawe	NPP	Greater Accra
2	Sarah Adwoa Sarfo	Dome Kwabenya	NPP	Greater Accra
3	Lydia Seyram Alhassan	Ayawaso West Wuogon	NPP	Greater Accra
4	Sheila Bartels	Ablekuma North	NPP	Greater Accra
5	Ursula Owusu	Ablekuma West	NPP	Greater Accra
6	Dakoa Newman	Okaikoi South	NPP	Greater Accra
7	Sophia Karen Ackuaku	Domeabra/Obom	NDC	Greater Accra
8	Rita Naa Odoley Sowah	La Dadekotopon	NDC	Greater Accra
9	Theresa Lardi Awuni	Okaikwei North	NDC	Greater Accra
10	Zanetor Agyeman Rawlings	Klottey Korle	NDC	Greater Accra
11	Agnes Naa Momo Lartey	Krowor	NDC	Greater Accra
12	Linda Obenewaa Akweley Ocloo	Shai Osudoku	NDC	Greater Accra
13	Cudjoe Comfort Doyoe	Ada	NDC	Greater Accra
14	Nana Dokua Asiamah Adjei	Akropong	NPP	Eastern Region
15	Gifty Twum-Ampofo	Akim Abuakwa North	NPP	Eastern Region
16	Abena Osei-Asare	Atiwa East	NPP	Eastern Region
17	Mensah Betty Nana Efua Krosby	Afram Plains North	NDC	Eastern Region
18	Gizella Tetteh	Awutu Senya West	NDC	Central Region
19	Queenstar Pokuah Sawyerr	Agona East	NDC	Central Region
20	Naana Eyiah Quansah	Gomoa Central	NPP	Central Region
21	Mavis Hawa Koomson	Awutu Senya East	NPP	Central Region
22	Cynthia Mamle Morrison	Agona West	NPP	Central Region
23	Ophelia Hayford	Mfantseman	NPP	Central Region
24	Joycelyn Tetteh	North Dayi	NDC	Volta Region
25	Della Sowah	Kpando	NDC	Volta Region
26	Dzifa Abla Gomashie	Ketu South	NDC	Volta Region
27	Angela Oforiwa Alorwu-Tay	Afadzato South	NDC	Volta Region
28	Helen Adjoa Ntoso	Krachi West	NDC	Oti Region
29	Dorcas Affo-Toffey	Jomoro	NDC	Western Region
30	Adelaide Ntim	Nsuta-Kwamang-Beposo	NPP	Ashanti Region
31	Mavis Nkansah Boadu	Afigya Sekyere East	NPP	Ashanti Region
32	Patricia Appiagyei	Asokwa	NPP	Ashanti Region
33	Francisca Oteng Mensah	Kwabre East	NPP	Ashanti Region
34	Ama Pomaa Boateng	Juaben	NPP	Ashanti Region
35	Freda Prempeh	Tano North	NPP	Ahafo Region
36	Elizabeth Ofosu Agyare	Techiman North	NDC	Bono East Region
37	Akanvariva Lydia Lamisi	Tempane	NDC	Upper East Region
38	Akuka Albert Alalzuuga	Garu	NDC	Upper East Region
39	Zuwera Mohammed Ibrahimah	Salaga South	NDC	Savannah region
40	Lariba Abudu	Walewale	NPP	North East Region

== See also ==
- List of MPs elected in the 2020 Ghanaian general election
- Joyce Bamford-Addo - first female speaker of parliament in West Africa
- List of female members of the Seventh Parliament of the Fourth Republic of Ghana
