= Michael Afedi Gizo =

Ghanaian politician

MP for Shai-Osudoku
- In office 7 January 1993 – 6 January 2005
- President: John Agyekum Kufour

Personal details
- Born: 10 March 1946 (age 80) Shai-Osudoku, Greater Accra Region, Ghana
- Party: National Democratic Congress
- Education: Ghana Institute of Journalism, Ghana
- Occupation: Politician

Michael Afedi Gizo (born March 10, 1946) is a Ghanaian politician. He is a former member of the 3rd parliament of the 4th Republic of Ghana. He represented the Dangme West which is now Shai-Osudoku constituency in the Greater Accra Region on the ticket of the National Democratic Congress (NDC).

He was Greater Accra Regional Minister from 1992 to 1996. He also served as Minister of Tourism and also a Deputy Minister of Information. In 2015, Mr. Gizo was accepted as the new Paramount Chief of the Shai Traditional Area. He succeeded the late Nene Nagai Kassa VII. He is currently the chief of Agomeda.

== Early life and education ==
Gizo was born on 10 March 1946. He attained an academic degree at the Ghana Institute of Journalism majoring in Public relations.

== Politics ==
He was elected into the first parliament of the fourth republic of Ghana on 7 January 1993 after he was pronounced winner at the 1992 Ghanaian parliamentary election held on 29 December 1992. Gizo thereafter assumed office as the member of parliament for the Shai-Osudoku constituency after he had won the Ghana parliamentary elections in 1996.

He was succeeded by David Tetteh Assumeng. Michael won the Dangme West now Shai Osudoku parliamentary seat again in the Ghanaian parliamentary elections for the 3rd time in the 4th Republic of Ghana on the ticket of the National Democratic Congress (NDC) at the 1996 Ghanaian General Election.

He was pronounced winner after defeating Kwame Tetteh-Korly Agban of the New Patriotic Party and John Awuku Dziwornu of the Convention People's Party. Gizo obtained 65.80% of the total valid votes which is equivalent to 14,814 votes while his oppositions obtained 10.30% which is equivalent to 2,319 votes and 4.90% which is equivalent to 1,108 votes respectively.
