= Inspector Bediako =

Ghanaian TV Series

- Genre: Detective crime series
- Created by: Kojo Yankah
- Written by: Odie Hawkins
- Directed by: Odie Hawkins
- Creative director: Odie Hawkins
- Starring: Oscar Provencal (Inspector Bediako) & (Sowah); Ray Bediako (Inspector Bediako); Akosua Abdullah (Ayesha); Gloria Nsia Ababio (Dela); Martin Owusu (Bentle); Teiko
- Composer: William Anku
- Country of origin: Ghana
- Original language: English

Production
- Executive producer: Kojo Yankah
- Running time: 30 minutes
- Production company: Dateline Productions Limited

Original release
- Network: GTV
- Release: 3 April 1993

Inspector Bediako is a Ghanaian TV series which was aired in the 1990s. It portrayed the character of a young intelligent detective who catches criminals using various investigative methods of which he succeeds no matter the situation. The TV series was loved by Stephanie S. Sullivan. At the time it was on air, it was the only locally produced law enforcement series on television in Ghana.

== TV series ==
Inspector Bediako was launched on 24 March 1993 in Accra by Kojo Yankah who also created the series. He was the director of the Ghana Institute of Journalism until 1993. He was also Member of Parliament for Agona West from January 1993. The first episode entitled "Murder of Bontuku" was aired on 3 April 1993 on GTV. They were 30 minute episodes. This episode highlighted the cooperation necessary between the police and the public in solving crime. This programme filled a void left after Derrick, a crime detection series stopped showing in Ghana.

There has been speculation that the series was due to return in Ghana in 2017. Auditions were done for people interested in playing some of the characters in Accra in March 2017.

== Cast ==
- Oscar Provencal He was the lead actor, Inspector Bediako.
- Ray Bediako is reported as playing the part of Inspector Bediako in the first episode.
- Akosua Abdallah
- Gloria Nsia Ababio (Dela)
- Martin Owusu (Bentle)
- Teiko

== Creator ==
Kojo Yankah created the series and invited Odie Hawkins to write and direct Inspector Bediako.

== Director ==
The initial writer and director was Odie Hawkins. Jim Fara Awindor wrote and directed six episodes of Inspector Bediako in 1997.

== Music ==
Some of the music for the series was composed by William Anku.

== Awards ==
Provencal won the best Actor in Comedy (Bigman Wahala) at the Golden Movie Awards Africa.
