= Kwame Asare Obeng =

Ghanaian politician

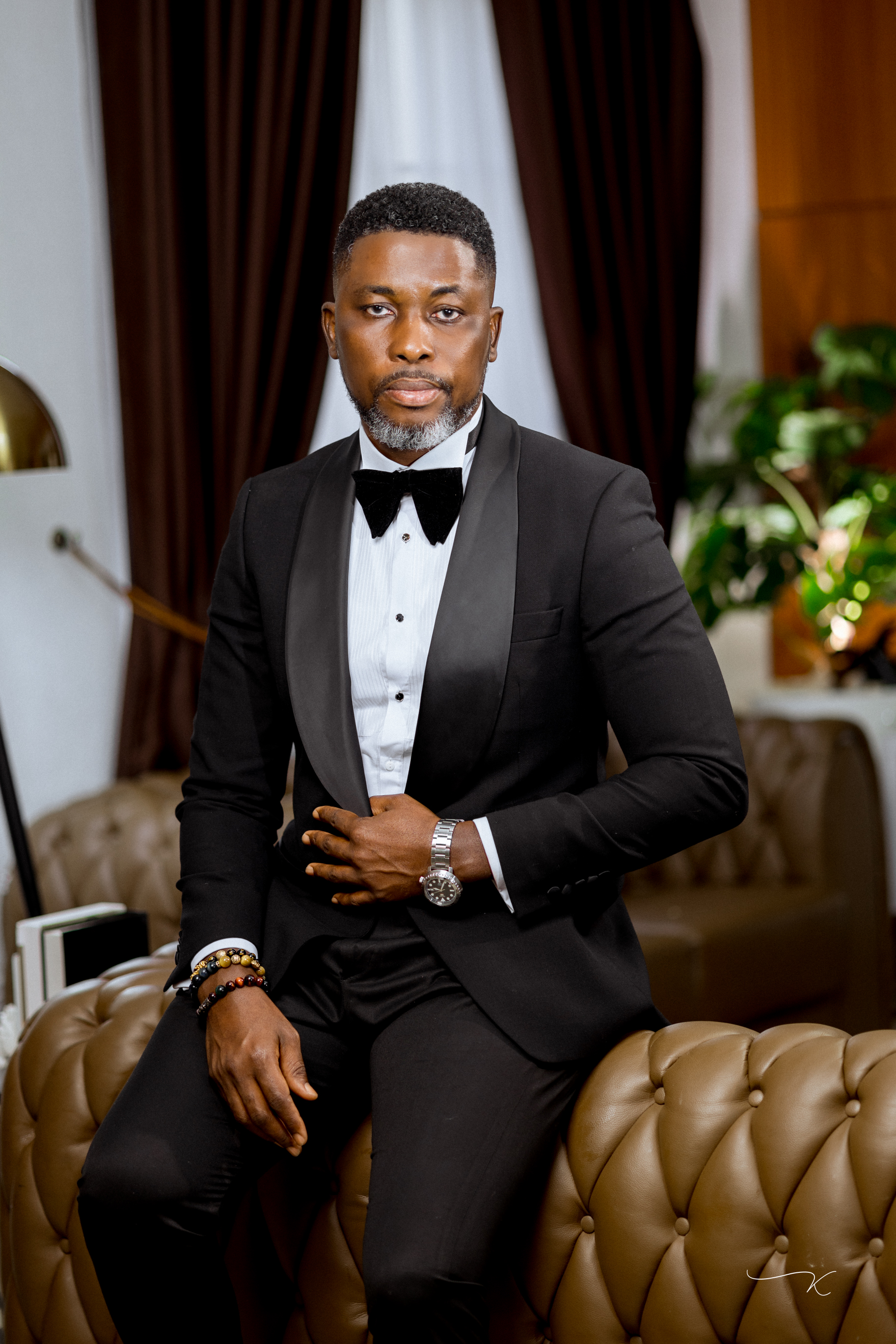
Kwame Asare Obeng in 2023

Kwame Asare Obeng, popularly known as A Plus, is a Ghanaian hiplife musician, political activist, and politician. He is the member of parliament for Gomoa Central constituency.

== Early life and education ==
Born on March 6, 1977, in Saltpond, Ghana, he is the second of six children of Mr. Daniel Kwasi Obeng, a proprietor, and Madam Elizabeth Obeng, a trader. A Plus spent his early years in Gomoa Asebu, in the Central Region of Ghana. His father owned the Gomoaman Preparatory School, where A Plus began his education. He has multiple degrees such as a Bsc in Public Administration and a Masters in International Relations Development (MIRD) from GIMPA. He also has an LLB from the University of Ghana Legon

== Musical career ==
A Plus emerged in the Ghanaian music scene as a hiplife artist with a strong inclination towards political and social commentary. He gained prominence with his 2000 album, "Freedom of Speech," released during Ghana's general elections. The hit track, "Mesuro Mpo Na Merekeka Yi O" (meaning "I am afraid of what I am saying but I will say it anyway"), boldly criticized politicians, reflecting his fearless approach to addressing societal issues through music.

Throughout his musical career, A Plus continued to produce songs that addressed political corruption and social injustices, solidifying his reputation as a musician unafraid to speak truth to power.

== Political career ==
Leveraging his musical platform, A Plus transitioned into active politics, maintaining his role as a social commentator and activist. In the 2024 Ghanaian general elections, he contested as an independent candidate and was elected as the member of parliament for the Gomoa Central Constituency, defeating the incumbent MP, Naana Eyiah Quansah.

Following his election, A Plus expressed his intention to align with the National Democratic Congress (NDC) caucus in Parliament, stating that while he had been approached by both major political parties, his inclinations leaned towards the NDC.

== Personal life ==
A Plus is married and has children. He is known for his outspoken nature and continues to be an influential figure in both the entertainment and political landscapes of Ghana.
