= Nana Asafo-Adjei Ayeh =

Ghanaian politician

Hon. Nana Asafo-Adjei Ayeh MP

Member of Parliament for Bosome-Freho
- Incumbent
- Assumed office 7 January 2025
- Preceded by: Akwasi Boateng
- President: John Dramani Mahama
- Vice President: Jane Naana Opoku-Agyemang

Personal details
- Born: 25 April 1987 (age 39) Asiwa, Ashanti Region, Ghana
- Party: New Patriotic Party
- Education: GIMPA, University of Ghana, Ghana Institute of Journalism
- Occupation: Politician
- Committees: Foreign Affairs and Regional Integration Committee; Public Administration & State Interests Committee

Nana Asafo‑Adjei Ayeh (born April 25, 1987) is a Ghanaian politician serving as the Member of Parliament for the Bosome-Freho constituency in the Ashanti Region. He represents the New Patriotic Party (NPP) in the Ninth Parliament of the Fourth Republic of Ghana.

== Early life and education ==
Ayeh was born on 25 April 1987, in Asiwa, a town in the Ashanti Region of Ghana. He holds a Master of Arts degree from the Ghana Institute of Management and Public Administration (GIMPA) a master's degree from the Ghana Institute of Journalism in December 2019, and another master's degree from the University of Ghana in May 2017. He also completed a Postgraduate Certificate at GIMPA in December 2023.

== Career ==
Ayeh has served as Director of International Relations at the National Disaster Management Organisation (NADMO).

=== Politics ===
Ayeh contested and won the Bosome-Freho seat in the December 7, 2024 general election, flipping the seat from the NDC and winning by a margin of 1,076 votes
