= Kojo Acquah Yankah =

Ghanaian politician (born 1954)

Kojo Acquah Yankah is a Ghanaian politician and member of the first parliament of the fourth republic of Ghana representing Agona East constituency under the membership of the National Democratic Congress (NDC).

== Early life and education ==
Kojo was born on 15 July 1954.

== Politics ==
He began his political career in 1992 when he became the parliamentary candidate for the National Democratic Congress (NDC) to represent his constituency in the Central Region of Ghana prior to the commencement of the 1992 Ghanaian parliamentary election.

He was sworn into the First Parliament of the Fourth Republic of Ghana on 7 January 1993 after being pronounced winner at the 1992 Ghanaian election held on 29 December 1992.

After serving his four years tenure in office, He retained the seat in the 1996 election to have a second term with 13,336 votes out of the total valid votes cast representing 43.40% over his Opponents Yeboah Alex Duodo a New Patriotic Party (NPP) member who polled 8,605 representing 28.00% votes out of the total valid votes cast, Kweku James Mensah a National Convention Party (NCP) member who polled 1,843 votes representing 6.00% out of the total valid votes cast, Kofi Owusu a Convention People's Party (CPP) member who polled 470 votes representing 1.50% out of the total valid votes cast, Martin Kobina Nkum a New Patriotic Party (NPP) member who polled 389 votes representing 1.30% out of the total valid votes cast and Kojo A. Yankah a New Patriotic Party (NPP) member who also polled 0 votes representing 0.00% out of the total valid votes cast. He was thereafter re-elected on 7 January 1997.
