= Rachel Appoh =

Ghanaian politician

- Born: Rachel Florence Appoh; 6 October 1980 (age 44); Gomoa Aboso, central region, Ghana
- Education: Cape Coast Polytechnic: Diploma, Accounting (2000-2002); Pentecost University College, B.S., Accounting (2005–2008)
- Occupation: Member of Parliament
- Employer(s): Kama Health Service, Internal auditor (2011–12); AngloGold Ashanti, Cost Accountant / Cost Controller (2008–10); Peace FM, Finance & Administration (2006–07); Pentecost University, Public Relation Officer (2007–08)

Rachel Florence Appoh (born 6 October 1980) is a Ghanaian politician and former National Democratic Congress (NDC) member of Parliament for Gomoa Central Constituency, Central Region of Ghana. Formerly the Deputy Minister of Gender, Children and Social Protection, she was succeeded by Naana Ayiah Quansah during the 2016 parliamentary elections

== Early life and education ==
Rachel Florence Appoh (born 6 October 1980) Member of Parliament for Gomoa Central Region of [Ghana].She has two master's degrees currently. MSC International Finance and Accounting at University of Buckinghamshire (UK) 2015 and Masters in Governance and Leadership (MGL) at Gimpa Accra 2019. She had her tertiary education at Pentecost university, Accra where she acquired Bsc Accounting in 2008. She belongs to the National Democratic Congress party and represents the majority in parliament.

== Employment ==
She worked as an Auditor at KAMA Health Service, Labone in Accra.She also worked as a Cost controller/ Ac countant at Anglo Gold Ashanti Ltd and PeaceFm respectively. She represented Gomoa Central Constituency as Member of Parliament between 2013 and 2016. She became Deputy Minister of Gender, Children and Social Protection afterwards

== Politics ==
Formerly the Deputy Minister of Gender, Children and Social Protection, she was succeeded by Naana Ayiah Quansah during the 2016 parliamentary elections.

According to Appoh, the Ghanaian political system has been monetized to the extent that without money one cannot win any election. In an interview monitored by The Ghana Report, she said she took a loan of GHC700,000 to finance her 2016 parliamentary bid in Gomoa Central Constituency in the Central Region, which she lost.

== Personal life ==
Appoh is married to Samuel Nana Opoku, and has one child.
