= Akwasi Gyamfi Onyina‑Acheampong =

Ghanaian politician

Hon. Akwasi Gyamfi Onyina‑Acheampong MP

Member of the Ghana Parliament for Kwabre East
- Incumbent
- Assumed office 7 January 2025
- Preceded by: Francisca Oteng-Mensah
- President: John Dramani Mahama
- Vice President: Jane Naana Opoku-Agyemang

Personal details
- Born: 13 January 1980 (age 46) Abira, Ashanti Region, Ghana
- Party: New Patriotic Party
- Education: University of Cape Coast; Kumasi High School
- Occupation: Politician
- Profession: Development planner

Akwasi Gyamfi Onyina‑Acheampong (born January 13, 1980) is a Ghanaian politician serving as the Member of Parliament for the Kwabre East constituency in the Ashanti Region. He represents the New Patriotic Party (NPP) in the Ninth Parliament of the Fourth Republic of Ghana.

== Early life and education ==
Onyina‑Acheampong was born in Abira, a town in the Ashanti Region of Ghana. He began his education at Kumasi High School, where he completed his GCE Ordinary Level in June 1994 and Advanced Level in June 1996. He later attended the University of Cape Coast, graduating in July 2001 with a Bachelor of Education degree in psychology (First Class Honours).

== Career ==
Onyina‑Acheampong began his career in the cocoa and cashew sector. He held positions at AgroEcom Ghana Ltd, including District Manager, Area Manager, Operations Manager, and Acting Head of the Licensed Buying Company (Cocoa). He also served as General Manager for both Ecom Ghana (Kiteko) and Ecom Ghana (Unicom). His earlier roles include supervisory and managerial positions at Sompa Kokoo and Caspian UK.

=== Politics ===
Akwasi Gyamfi Onyina‑Acheampong contested and won the Kwabre East parliamentary seat in the December 2024 general elections on the ticket of the New Patriotic Party (NPP), succeeding Francisca Oteng‑Mensah. In Parliament, he serves on the Budget Committee and the Independent Constitutional Bodies Committee
