= Ernestina Ofori Dangbey =

Ghanaian politician

Hon. Ernestina Ofori Dangbey MP

Member of Parliament for Agona West
- Incumbent
- Assumed office 7 January 2025
- Preceded by: Cynthia Mamle Morrison

Personal details
- Party: National Democratic Congress

Ernestina Ofori Dangbey is a Ghanaian politician who is a member of the National Democratic Congress (NDC). She is currently the member of parliament for Agona West Constituency.

== Politics ==
In July 2023, she stood as the National Democratic Congress parliamentary candidate in primaries for Agona West.

In 2024 General Elections Ernestina Ofori Dangbey stood in Agona West Constituency against Christopher Arthur the New Patriotic Party candidate and the incumbent Cynthia Mamle Morrison who was standing as an independent candidate receiving 25,965 votes (48.23%) defeating her opponents who obtained 20,625 votes (38.31%) and 7,243 votes (13.45%) respectively.
