= Akwasi Boateng =

Ghanaian politician

Hon Akwasi Darko Boateng
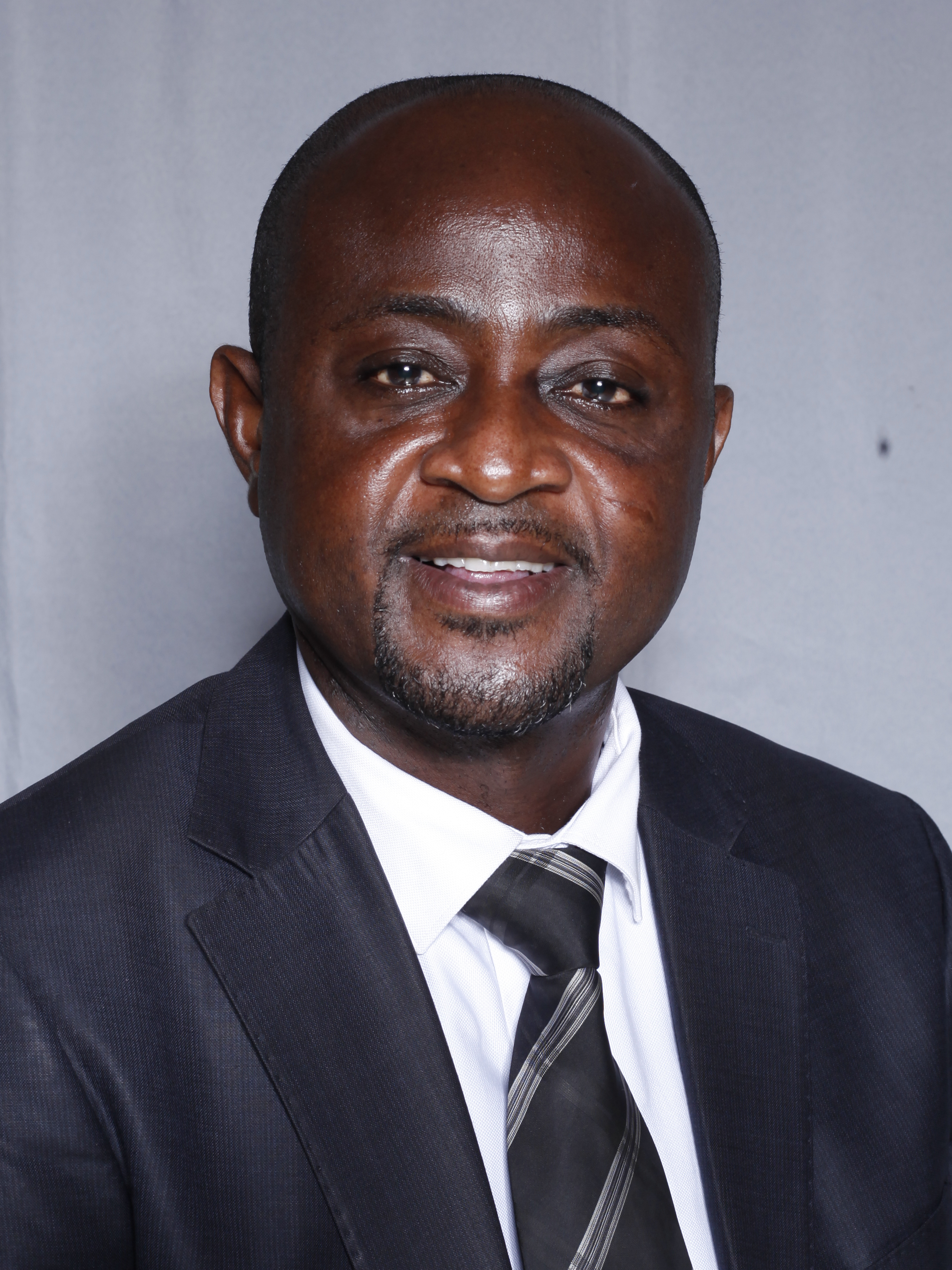

Member of the Ghana Parliament for Bosome Freho
- Incumbent
- Assumed office 7 January 2021

Personal details
- Born: Akwasi Darko Boateng; 20 June 1967 (age 59) Apewu-Dwumakro
- Party: New Patriotic Party
- Occupation: Politician
- Profession: Managing Director
- Committees: Youth, Sports and Culture Committee; Judiciary Committee

Akwasi Darko Boateng is the member of parliament for Bosome Freho Constituency, Ashanti Region, Ghana. He has been a member of parliament since 7 January 2021.

== Early life and education ==
Boateng was born on Tuesday, 20 June 1967 and hails from Apewu-Dwumako in the Ashanti Region of Ghana. He obtained his Executive Masters in Governance and leadership and his Post Graduate Diploma in Business Administration in 2018. He also had his Ordinary and Advance levels in 1990 and 1993 respectively.

== Career ==
Boateng is a Ghanaian politician. He has been the member of parliament for the Bosome Freho Constituency since January 2021. Prior to entering parliament, he worked with Auto-Life Company Limited and Pescourt Hotel.

== Politics ==
Boateng came out victorious after contesting two aspiring candidates on the ticket of the New Patriotic Party (NPP) during the parliamentary primaries organized to get a candidate to represent the NPP in the 2020 December election. The two aspirants he contested were Hon Joyce Adwoa Akoh Dei and Mr. Peter Adjei Agyemang. Out of 415 delegates who cast their votes, Boateng won the primaries by 191 votes against the first runner up, Agyemang who polled 140 votes while the then incumbent MP, Dei placed third with 76 votes, 8 votes were rejected.

In the 7 December 2020 parliamentary elections, Boateng polled 20,401 votes representing 73.10% out of 27,910 total votes cast. Based on the outcome of the parliamentary elections he was declared the member of parliament elect for the Bosome Freho Constituency of the Ashanti Region, Ghana.

In the parliamentary primaries of 2024 for the NPP, he was defeated in his attempt to represent the party by Nana Kwame Asafo-Adjei Ayeh. Ayeh secured 233 votes, surpassing Boateng who received 187 votes out of the total valid votes cast.

=== Committees ===
Boateng is a member of the Youth, Sports and Culture Committee and also a member of the Judiciary Committee.

== Personal life ==
Boateng is a Christian.

== Philanthropy ==
In February 2021, he presented 2,400 hand sanitizers, 50 shaving machines for barbers 130 sewing machines, 1,500 school uniforms, 2,400 nose masks, 30 sterilize cabinets, 5 boxes of boots and 5 boxes of machetes for famers in the Bosome Freho Constituency in the Ashanti Region. He also launched the educational fund to care for the needy but brilliant students with the seed money of GHS30,000 and also pledged to support GHS20,000 every year.
