= David Tetteh Assumeng =

Ghanaian politician

Hon. David Tetteh Assumeng

Member of the Ghana Parliament for Shai Osudoku Constituency
- In office 7 January 2005 – 6 January 2017
- Preceded by: Michael Afedi Gizo
- Succeeded by: Linda Obenewaa Akweley Ocloo

Personal details
- Born: 10 September 1961 (age 64) Ghana
- Party: National Democratic Congress
- Education: University of Ghana; Ghana Institute of Management and Public Administration
- Occupation: Politician

David Tetteh Assumeng is a Ghanaian politician. He was the member of parliament for the Shai Osudoku Constituency from 7 January 2005 to 6 January 2017.

== Early life and education ==
Assumeng was born on 10 September 1961. He hails from Osudoku in the Greater Accra Region of Ghana. He obtained his Diploma from the University of Ghana in 2004 and his Masters in Governance and Leadership (EMGL) from the Ghana Institute of Management and Public Administration (GIMPA) in 2008.

== Career ==
Prior to entering politics, Assumeng was the Youth Co-ordinator of the National Youth Council at the Ada West District.

== Politics ==
Assumeng entered parliament on 7 January 2005 on the ticket of the National Democratic Congress representing the Shai Osudoku Constituency. He lost the NDC primaries in 2015 and was consequently unable to contest for the seat in the 2016 Ghanaian general election. His term in parliament ended on 6 January 2017.

== Personal life ==
Assumeng is married with a child. He identifies as a Christian and a member of the Presbyterian Church of Ghana.
