= Daoud Anum Yemoh =

Ghanaian politician

Member of Ghana Parliament
- Constituency: Domeabra-Obom

Personal details
- Born: May 6, 1954
- Party: National Democratic Congress
- Education: Ghana Institute of Journalism

Daoud Anum Yemoh (born May 6, 1954) is a Ghanaian journalist and politician. He was a member of the Sixth Parliament of the Fourth Republic of Ghana representing the Domeabra Obom Constituency in the Greater Accra Region on the ticket of the National Democratic Congress.

== Personal life ==
Yemoh is Christian. He is married with five children.

== Early life and education ==
Yemoh was born on May 6, 1954. He hails from La-Accra, a town in the Greater Accra Region of Ghana. He graduated from Ghana Institute of Journalism and obtained his Bachelor of Science degree in journalism in 1981. He also attended Sofia-Bulgaria and obtained his diploma in Social Sciences from the Academy of Science and Management in 1985.

== Politics ==
Yemoh is a member of the National Democratic Congress (NDC). He was first elected as member of the parliament to represent Domeabra Obom Constituency in the 2004 Ghanaian general election and assumed office in January 2005. He became a member of the Fifth Parliament after his re-election into office in January 2009. In 2012, he contested for third time on the ticket of the NDC and won.
