= Justice Joe Appiah =

Ghanaian politician

Justice Joe Appiah (born December 21, 1959) is a Ghanaian politician. He was the member of the Sixth Parliament of the Fourth Republic of Ghana representing the Ablekuma North Constituency in the Greater Accra Region on the ticket of the New Patriotic Party.

== Personal life ==
Appiah is a Christian who fellowships at the Assemblies of God Church. He is married with five children.

== Early life and education ==
Appiah was born on December 21, 1959. He hails from Akim Oda, a town in the Eastern Region of Ghana. He had a Diploma in Network Engineering, Net Africa Ghana in 2007. He is also a graduate of the Ghana Institute of Management and Public Administration and obtained his Certificate in Administration and Management in 2008.

== Politics ==
Appiah is a member of the New Patriotic Party (NPP). He became a member of the 5th parliament of Ghana after emerging winner in the 2008 Ghanaian General Elections in his constituency. In 2012, he contested for a re-election into the Ablekuma North parliamentary office on the ticket of the NPP sixth parliament of the fourth republic and won. In the 2015 Parliamentary primaries, he lost to Hon. Nana Akua Owusu Afriyie, who went to become the MP for Ablekuma North (2017-2021).
