= Frank Afriyie =

Ghanaian politician

Frank Afriyie is a Ghanaian politician representing Afadjato South constituency in the 9th Parliament of the 4th Republic of Ghana under the auspices of the National Democratic Congress (NDC).

== Early life ==
Frank Afriyie was born on 18 December 1978. He earned his SSSCE in the year May 1997 from Bishop Herman Senior High School and graduated from College of Agriculture and Allied Sciences with a General certificate in Agriculture in 2002. In 2007 Frank Afriyie graduated from University of Ghana, Legon with a certificate in BA Political Science with Psychology. He then acquired his Masters in 2013 from GIMPA.

== Employment ==
At the Office of the President of the National Democratic Congress (NDC), Afriyie worked as the Staffer/Administrator for the Afadjato South constituency.

== Personal life ==
He is a Christian who hails from Have-Etoe in the Volta Region of Ghana.
