= Isaac Awuku Yibor =

Ghanaian politician

Isaac Awuku Yibor is a Ghanaian politician and a member of the National Democratic Congress (NDC). He represent Domeabra Obom constituency in the Greater Accra Region of Ghana.

== Early life and education. ==
Isaac Awuku Yibor was born on Wednesday, 8th August, 1979. He hails from a city called Mafi-Avedo. He had his BECE at Obom JSS in 1992. He then moved to Amasaman for his SSC in the year 1996.
