= Obuobia Darko-Opoku =

Ghanaian politician, journalist and philanthropist

Obuobia Darko Opoku
- Citizenship: Ghana
- Occupations: Politician, Journalist and Philanthropist
- Organization: Obuobia foundation
- Known for: Host for pause for three minutes
- Notable work: Former parliamentary candidate for the National Democratic congress in weija Gbawes. Hosted TV Africa's morning show "Breakfast Live"

Obuobia Darko-Opoku is a Ghanaian politician, journalist and philanthropist. She is a former parliamentary candidate for the National Democratic Congress in Weija-Gbawe.

== Career ==
She used to host TV Africa's Morning Show dubbed "Breakfast Live" along with actress Nikki Samonas and Khadijat. She is the host for Pause for three minutes, a motivational show which was nominated for L.E.A.D series award in 2017.

== Philanthropy ==
Darko-Opoku founded the Obuobia Foundation, a non profit organization which provides support to women and her constituents. Through her foundation she has made various donations to the Muslim community, the Weija Gbawe Constituency and the Ga South Municipality.

== Politics ==
During the 2012 and 2016 General Elections, she contested for the Weija-Gbawe parliamentary seat and lost. In 2019, she was appointed by the National Democratic Congress to be the party's Deputy National Communications Director. And she is the former Deputy Chief Executive Director of Ghana Free Zones Authority.
