= Nana Akua Owusu Afriyie =

Ghanaian politician

Hon. H.E. Nana Akua Owusu Afriyieh
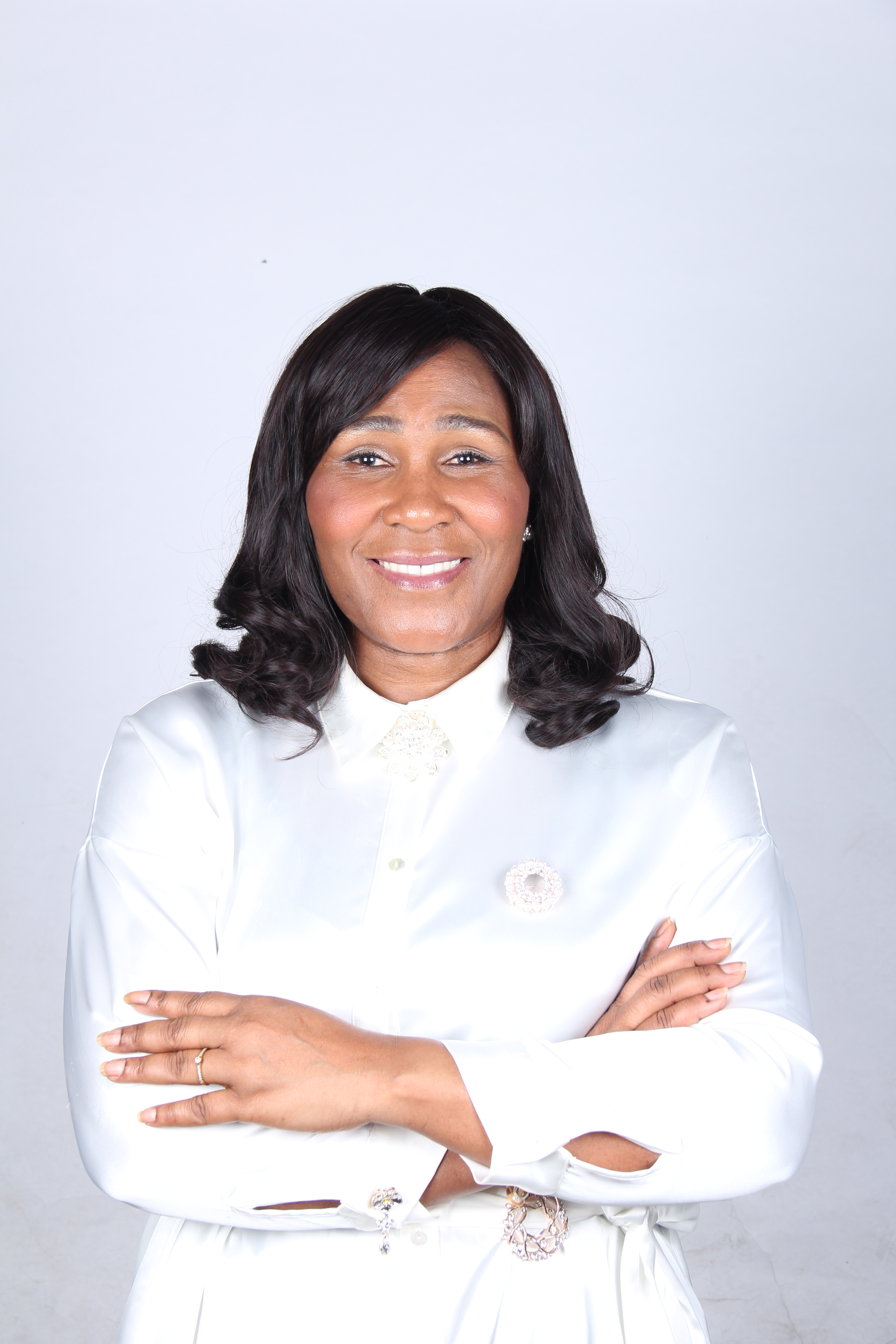

Member of Ghanaian parliament for Ablekuma North constituency
- In office 7 January 2017 – 6 January 2021
- Preceded by: Justice Joe Appiah
- Succeeded by: Shiela Bartels

Ghana's Deputy Ambassador to China

Personal details
- Born: Nana Akua Simpson; 3 September 1969 (age 57) Saltpond, Ghana
- Party: New Patriotic Party
- Children: 4
- Education: University of Cape Coast; Accra Girls Senior High School

Nana Akua Owusu Afriyieh (born 3 September 1969) is a Ghanaian politician and a member of the New Patriotic Party. She is currently Ghana's Deputy Ambassador to China. She was the Member of Parliament for Ablekuma North constituency.

== Early life and education ==
Owusu Afriyieh was born on 3 September 1969 in Saltpond, Central Region. She holds a diploma in Management Studies from the University of Cape Coast.

== Politics ==
In 2015, she contested and won the NPP parliamentary seat for the Ablekuma North Constituency in the Greater Accra Region. She won this parliamentary seat during the 2016 Ghanaian general elections. Three other candidates, namely Sally Amaki Darko of the National Democratic Congress, and Akwasi Asiama Adade of the Conventions People's Party also contested in the 2016 by-election of Ablekuma North held on 7 December 2016. Owusu Afriyie won the election by obtaining 54,698 votes out of the 82,091 cast, representing 66.84 percent of total valid votes.

== Personal life ==
Owusu Afriyieh is a widow with four children. She identifies as a Christian.
