= Tina Gifty Mensah =

Ghanaian politician (born 1964)

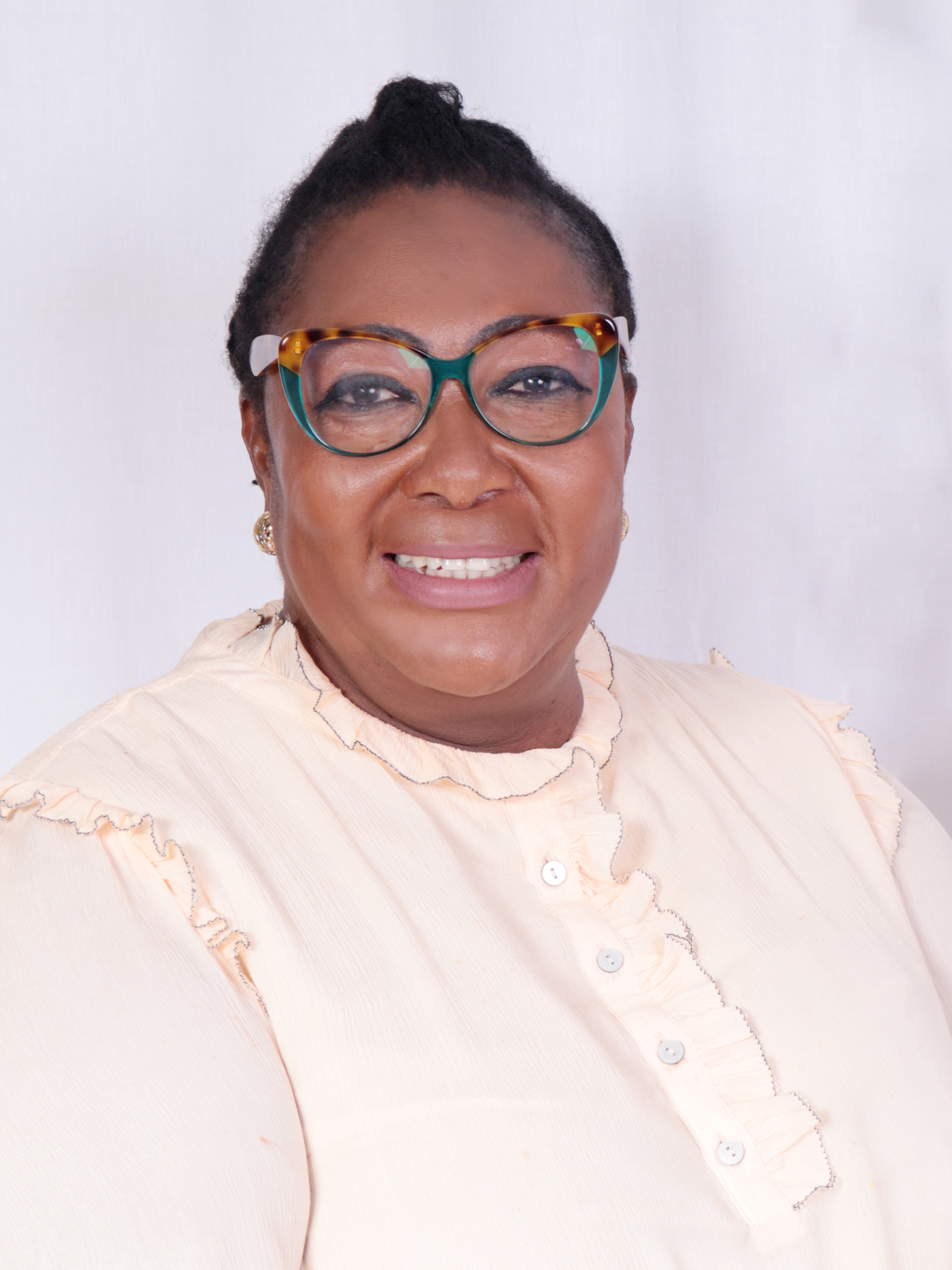

Member of Parliament
- In office 7 January 2017 – 6 January 2021
- Preceded by: Obuobia Darko-Opoku
- Parliamentary group: New Patriotic Party
- In office 7 January 2021 – 6 January 2025

Personal details
- Born: 23 January 1964 (age 62) Jamestown
- Education: Accra Girls School.
- Profession: Politician

Tina Gifty Naa Ayele Mensah (born 23 January 1964) is a Ghanaian politician and the member of parliament for Weija-Gbawe constituency. She is a member of the New Patriotic Party and was appointed into office as deputy Health Minister by Nana Addo on 15 March 2017.

== Early life and education ==
Mensah was born on 23 January 1964 in Jamestown, British Accra of the Greater Accra Region. She had her secondary education at Accra Girls School. She holds a bachelor's degree in Public Administration and Masters in international relations and Diplomacy from the Ghana Institute of Management and Public Administration (GIMPA)

== Politics ==
Tina Gifty Mensah is a member of New Patriotic Party and was a member of parliament for Weija-Gbawe constituency in the Greater Accra Region in the Seventh and Eighth Parliament of the Fourth Republic of Ghana.

=== 2016 election ===
Mensah secured 34,216 votes out of the 59,926 valid votes cast in the 2016 Ghanaian general election. She defeated Obuobia Darko-Opoku and Jessica Adwoa Mannuell.

=== 2020 election ===
Mensah again contested the Weija- Gbawe (Ghana parliament constituency)parliamentary seat during the 2020 Ghanaian general election as the parliamentary candidate for the New Patriotic Party and won with 36,875 votes out of 70,399 votes representing 52.38%. She was elected over Cleland Nii Ayaa Ayison of the National Democratic Congress, Nii Djaban Abbey Oromasis of GUM, Saviour Kofi Gdedze of the Convention People's Party Rita Dugah of APC and Thomas Moon Jnr of the PPP. They obtained 32,218 votes, 654 votes, 652 votes, 0 votes and 0 votes respectively. These is equivalent to 45.76%, 0.93%, 0.93%, 0.00% and 0.00% of the total votes respectively.

In the parliamentary primaries of 2024 for the NPP, she was defeated in her attempt to represent the party by Jerry Ahmed Shaib. Shaib secured 783 votes to Gifty Mensah's 361 votes, out of the total valid votes cast.

== Career ==
She was the managing director of Gemens Company LTD. in Mamprobi, Accra.

== Awards ==
On 4 August 2017, she was awarded by the Ghana-Nigeria Youth Organization for outstanding leadership. In 2017 she was adjudged best Deputy Minister by FAKS Investigative Services.

== Personal life ==
Tina is married with three children. She identifies as a Christian.
