= Oscar Provencal =

Ghanaian Actor

- Born: Oscar Provencal
- Citizenship: Ghanaian
- Occupations: Actor, Director, Producer
- Known for: His role as Inspector Bediako in the TV series Inspector Bediako.
- Notable work: Deadly Voyage

Oscar Provencal is a Ghanaian actor, director, philanthropist and producer .

Provencal, son of the late Ghanaian politician H.S.T Provencal, is best known for his role as Inspector Bediako in the TV series Inspector Bediako.

== Career ==
In the early 1990s, Provencal played Inspector Bediako. He also contested for the position of Deputy of Creative Arts Minister. He was the judge for Ghana Most Beautiful Beauty Pageant and is also known for his philanthropy.

== Filmography ==
- Deadly Voyage
- Inspector Bediako
- Bigman Wahala
- The Other Side of the Rich
- Sin City
