= Sophia Karen Edem Ackuaku =

Ghanaian politician (b. 1972)

Hon. Sophia Karen Edzem Ackuaku MP
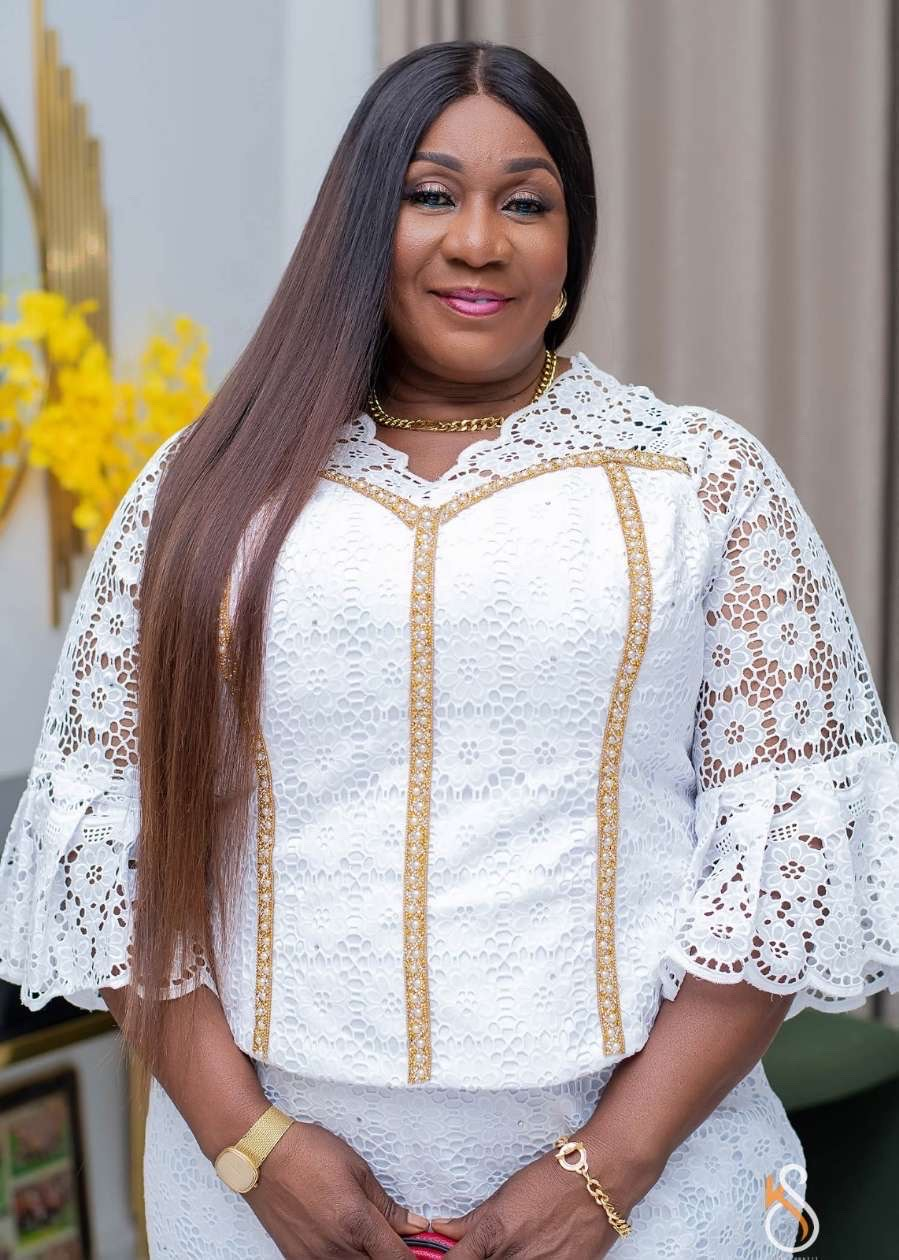

Deputy Director of National Service Scheme (2013-2017) Member of Parliament for Domeabra Obom Constituency (2017-2025) CEO of Eligreen Enterprise Limited (2012-present) CEO of AMSOS Ghana Limited (2012-present)

Member of the Ghana Parliament for Domeabra-Obom Constituency
- Incumbent
- Assumed office 7 January 2017
- Preceded by: Daoud Anum Yemoh
- President: Nana Akuffo-Addo

Personal details
- Born: Sophia Karen Edem Ackuaku; 7 January 1972 (age 54) Ghana
- Party: National Democratic Congress
- Children: 3
- Education: MountCrest University College
- Occupation: Politician, Businesswoman
- Profession: Politician, Lawyer, Businesswoman
- Committees: Food, Agriculture and Cocoa Affairs, Poverty Reduction Strategy Committee

Sophia Karen Edzem Ackuaku is a Ghanaian politician and member of the Seventh Parliament of the Fourth Republic of Ghana representing the Domeabra-Obom Constituency in the Greater Accra Region on the ticket of the National Democratic Congress.

== Early life and education ==
Ackuaku was born on 7 January 1972. She hails from Anyarko in the Volta Region of Ghana. Ackuaku earned her Bachelor of Laws from MountCrest University College and a certificate in public relation, advertisement and marketing from the Ghana Institute of Journalism. She also has a diploma in social work from the School of Social Work in Osu-Accra and a proficiency in Dutch Language from Zadkine College in Rotterdam, Holland. Ackuaku also has a certificate in leadership, human rights and HIV/AIDS from the Ark Foundation in Ghana.

== Politics ==
Sophia contested and won the parliamentary seat for the Domeabra-Obom Constituency in the 2016 Ghanaian general elections. She contested against four others namely Darison Barba Mohammed of the New Patriotic Party, Ekow Jones Mensah of the Conventions People's Party, Gideon Dudu of the Progressive People's Party and Pius Kwame Fiakuna an independent candidate. She won the election by obtaining 14,301 votes out of the 21,506 cast, representing 68.3 percent of the total valid votes cast. She served as a member on the Food, Agriculture and Cocoa Affairs Committee and Poverty Reduction Strategy Committee.

=== 2020 election ===
Ackuaku was re-elected as a member of parliament for Domeabra- Obom (Ghana parliament constituency) on the ticket of National Democratic Congress during the 2020 Ghanaian general election with 22,083 votes representing 60.46% of the total votes. She was elected over Philip E. K Doe of the New Patriotic Party, who pulled 13,989 votes which is equivalent to 38.30% and the parliamentary candidate for Progressive People's Party Duodu Gideon had 454 votes representing 1.24% of the total votes.

== Career ==
As a parliamentarian in the Ghanaian parliament, she has served on the Food, Agriculture and Cocoa Affairs Committee and the Poverty Reduction Strategy Committee of parliament. Before her status as a member of the Ghanaian parliament, she has worked as the deputy executive director in charge of operations at the Ghana National Service Scheme, from 2013 to 2016. From 2004 to 2013 she worked as a managing director at Eligreen/Amsos Ghana Limited. Before this she has worked previously as the FBWE focal person for the Federation of Business Women Entrepreneurs from 2001 to 2010.

== Personal life ==
Ackuaku is married with three children. She identifies with the Christian religion.

=== Awards ===
Ackuaku was pronounced Africa Iconic Female Parliamentarian of the Year at the Africa Iconic Women Recognition Awards (AIWRA) 2023.

Enstoolment

Sophia Karen Edzem Akuaku was enstooled as the nkosuoheneba (developmental queen) of Adenkrebi in the Eastern Region of Ghana on 16 December 2014.She bears the title Nana Afia Amponsah Ackuaku I. She was bestowed his honor due to unwavering commitment to supporting development in Adenkrebi. Many years into er reign she still continues to work towards ensuring a more developed area.
