= Francisca Oteng-Mensah =

Ghanaian politician and businesswoman

Hon. Francisca Oteng-Mensah MP
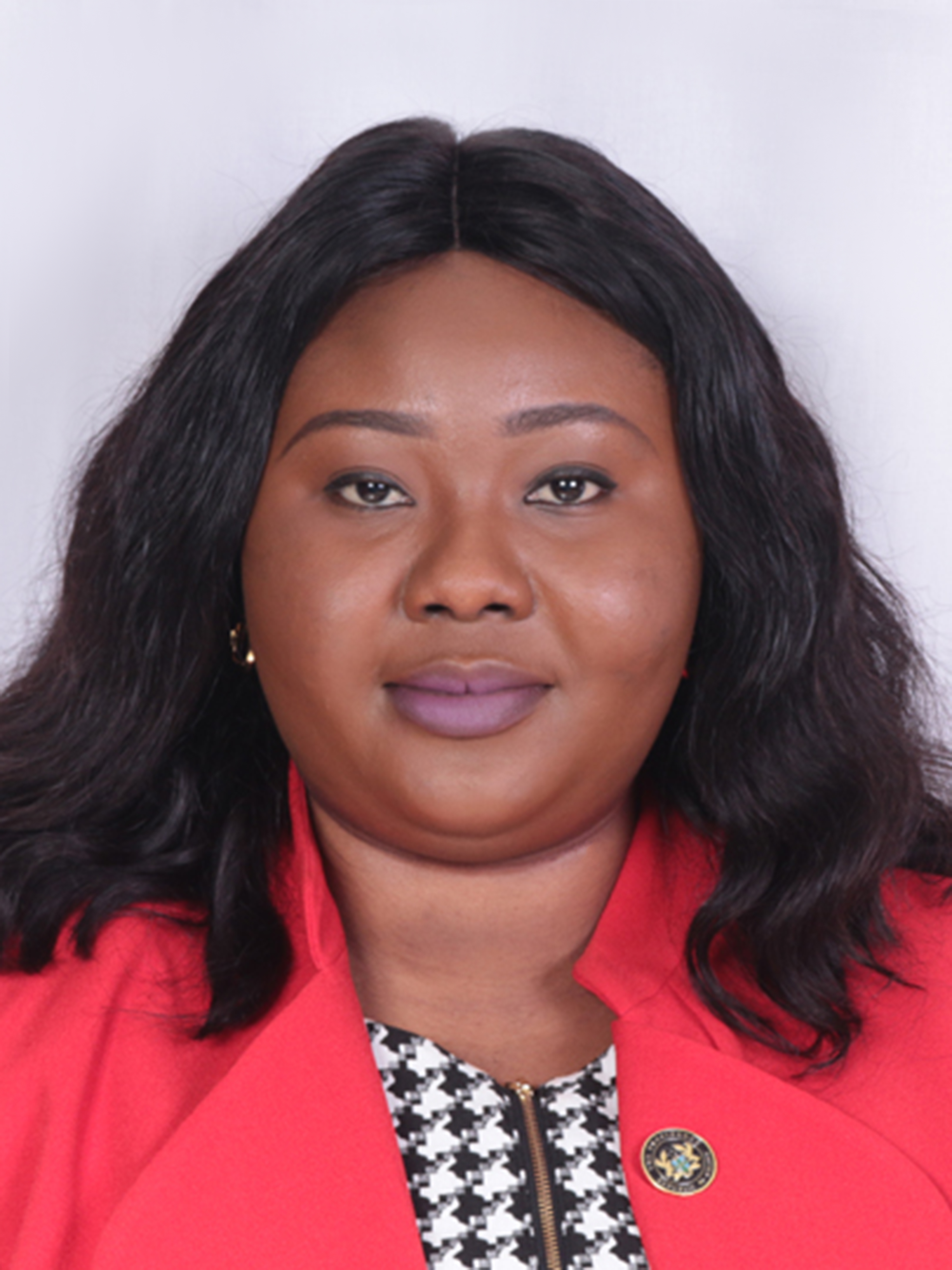

Member of the Ghana Parliament for Kwabre East
- In office 7 January 2017 – 6 January 2025
- Succeeded by: Akwasi Gyamfi Onyina‑Acheampong
- President: Nana Akuffo-Addo

Personal details
- Born: Francisca Oteng-Mensah; 15 February 1993 (age 33) Mamponteng, Ghana
- Party: New Patriotic Party
- Parent: Obeng Gyasi
- Education: Kwame Nkrumah University of Science and Technology
- Occupation: Politician
- Profession: Member of Parliament
- Cabinet: Member of Parliament
- Committees: Trade, Industry and Tourism Committee, Privileges Committee

Francisca Oteng-Mensah (born 14 February 1993) is a member of parliament of the New Patriotic Party for the Kwabre East Constituency and was known as the youngest parliamentarian of the fourth republic of Ghana at the time of her election in 2016.

== Early life ==
Francisca was born at Aboaso Hospital at Mamponteng, Ashanti Region on 14 February 1993 . She is a daughter of Mrs. Joyce Oteng and Dr Kwaku Oteng a doctor and a businessman who is the C.E.O of the Angel Group of Companies.

== Education ==
Francisca attended three different schools during her basic and primary education. She first attended the Mamponteng Roman Catholic School, then to Revival Preparatory School at Breman and finally to Supreme Saviour International where she completed her Primary Six. She completed her Junior High education at Angel Educational Complex. She then continued to St. Roses Senior High School to complete her Senior High Education.

She studied law at the Faculty of Law at the Kwame Nkrumah University of Science and Technology (KNUST). Francisca was a second year Law student at the Kwame Nkrumah University of Science and Technology at the time she contested the elections in 2016.

== Career ==
Before her appointment as a member of parliament, she was employed as a Secretary at the Angel Group of Companies in Kumasi. In December 2017, she was appointed as the chairperson of the National Youth Authority.

== Politics ==
She won her parliamentary seat for the Kwabre East Constituency in the Ashanti Region of Ghana, after the 2016 Ghanaian general elections. She is currently the youngest person to be in parliament at the age of 23. She was nominated as the Deputy-Minister for Gender, Children and Social Protection by Nana Akuffo-Addo. She was sworn into office as a Deputy-Minister for Gender, Children and Social Protection on Wednesday (December 28, 2022).

== Religion ==
Francisca is a Christian and fellowships with Assemblies of God Church.

== Personal life ==
Francisca is married to Kwadwo Adade Amponsah.
