= Kojo Yankah =

Ghanaian politician (born 1945)

Hon. Kojo Acquah Yankah

Member of the Ghana Parliament for Agona East
- In office 7 January 1993 – 6 January 2001
- Succeeded by: Kwaku Adu Yeboah
- Majority: 4,731 (19.2%)

Ashanti Regional Minister
- In office 1998 – 4 November 1999
- President: Jerry Rawlings
- Succeeded by: Samuel Nuamah-Donkoh

Personal details
- Born: 16 August 1945 (age 81) Agona Duakwa, Ghana
- Party: National Democratic Congress
- Spouse(s): Susan Roseline Esi Thompson (deceased); Ekua Essandoh (deceased)
- Children: Esi Yankah Dr. Abena Yankah Maame Yankah
- Education: University of Ghana

Kojo Acquah Yankah (born 16 August 1945) is a former Member of Parliament in Ghana. He also served as a Minister of State in the Rawlings government. He is the founder and President of the African University College of Communications and is also a former editor of the Daily Graphic, the widest circulation newspaper in Ghana.

== Education ==
Kojo Yankah was born at Agona Duakwa in the Agona East District of the Central Region of Ghana. His primary education was in various schools in the Central Region. He attended Adisadel College for his secondary education. He then taught for a few years before proceeding to the University of Ghana, where he graduated with a Bachelor of Arts Honours degree in English. He pursued further education at the University of Ghana for the Graduate Diploma in Journalism & Communication (1976) and also the M.Phil., African Studies (1988). He also went on Fellowship at the University of Nairobi, Kenya and Cornell University, Cornell, Ithaca, New York, to study Communication Studies for Development.

== Communications and Culture ==
After graduation, Yankah was invited to teach English at his alma mater Adisadel College for two years. He worked with various government institutions, including the Information Services Department and the Social Security and National Insurance Trust. He was appointed Deputy Public Relations Manager of the Ghana Industrial Holding Corporation (GIHOC) in 1978–1980, after which he resigned to establish his PR firm, Yankah & Associates, from where he also practiced as a freelance Broadcaster, journalist and PR consultant. In 1982, after the Provisional National Defence Council (PNDC) military government came to power, he was appointed editor of the government-owned Daily Graphic newspaper which had the highest circulation in Ghana. He was later appointed Director of the Ghana Institute of Journalism (GIJ) in 1984 until 1993 when he opted to stand for elections and won to become Member of Parliament for Agona East Constituency. The President appointed him Deputy Minister for Information (1993–96), Minister of Central Region (!997-1998), and Minister for Ashanti Region (late 1998 till he resigned from office in December 1999 for personal reasons). He went back to public relations consultancy under Yankah & Associates while planning to establish a Communication institution. In 2002, he established the Africa Institute of Journalism and Communications which became the African University College of Communications, affiliated to the University of Ghana and with accreditation from the National Accreditation Board in March 2004.

Kojo Yankah, a writer and Cultural activist, created and produced the first local detective television series, INSPECTOR BEDIAKO, on Ghana and Nigerian Television in 1990 for about 6 years. It is currently shown on DSTV. While as Minister of State, he was invited to serve as Chairman of the Marketing Committee of the newly established Pan African Historical Theatre Festival (PANAFEST).In 1997, he was elected Chairman of the International Board PANAFEST until he retired in 2007. Yankah later founded the Pan African Heritage World Museum (pahmuseum.org). He is also patron of the Ghana Culture Forum.

== Politics ==
With the return to party politics in Ghana, Yankah stood for elections as MP in the 1992 Ghanaian parliamentary election on the National Democratic Congress ticket and won the seat for the Agona East constituency. He retained the seat in the 1996 election to have a second term with 13,336 votes out of the 24,652 valid votes cast, representing 43.40% over his opponents: Yeboah Alex Duodo, an NPP member who polled 8,605 votes, Kweku James Mensah, an NCP member who polled 1,843 votes, Kofi Owusu, a CPP member who polled 470 votes, Martin Kobina Nkum, an NPP member who polled 389 votes and Kojo A. Yankah, an NPP member who also polled 0 votes. During the second term of the Rawlings government, Yankah was first appointed Central Regional Minister. He was later shifted to Ashanti Regional Minister, a position he held for only 11 months before he was moved to the National Development Planning Commission as a Minister of State. This led to his resignation from the government.

== Family ==
Kojo Yankah married Susan Roseline Esi Thompson, a Home Economics tutor, in 1977. She died on 30 July 2001 from a respiratory ailment. He was married to Ekua Essandoh, a banker, now deceased from breast cancer. He is currently married to Nana Nyarkoa Yankah (Maud Griffin), a graduate of University of Cape Coast and Nkosuohemaa of Agona Abodom.

He is the brother of Kofi Yankah, a Marketing Consultant, Prof Kwesi Yankah, an academic professor who was the Minister of Tertiary Education in the Government of Nana Akufo-Addo of the New Patriotic Party, and George Yankah, a retired PR officer of SSNIT.

== Publications ==
- Yankah, Kojo (1982). Crossroads at Ankobea. Accra: Asempa. ISBN 978-9964-78-044-9.
- Yankah, Kojo (1984). End of a journey: or a journalists report from the Libyan Jamahiriya. Dateline. ASIN B001A1GSSQ.
- Yankah, Kojo (1989).Dialogue with the North
- Yankah, Kojo (1990). The story of Namibia. p. 140. ISBN 978-9964-91-002-0.
- Yankah, Kojo (1990). Woes of a Kwatriot: Reflections on the Ghanaian Situation. Woeli Publishing Services. ISBN 978-9964904258.
- Yankah, Kojo (1992). The trial of J.J. Rawlings: Echoes of the 31st December Revolution. U.B. & U.S. Communication Systems. ISBN 978-1564110398.
- Yankah, Kojo (2007). Introduction to Branding and Marketing Communications Management.
- Yankah, Kojo (2009). Otumfuo Osei Tutu II: the King on the Golden Stool.
- Skinner, Chris; Kiuluku, Peter; Tikolo, Kentice; Yankah, Kojo (2016). Proactive Public Relations (Kindle ed.). Moran Publishers and Worldreader.

.Yankah, Kojo (2018) : Our Motherland - My Life. Publisher, Ayebia Publishing, London, UK.

. Yankah, Kojo (2019): From Jamestown to Jamestown, Publisher Uhuru Publications

Parliament of Ghana
Preceded by Start of 4th Republic	Member of Parliament for Agona East; 1993 – 2001	Succeeded by Kwaku Adu Yeboah
Political offices
Preceded by Ebenezer Kwabena Fosu	Central Regional Minister; 1997 – 1998	Succeeded by Jacob Arthur
Preceded by ?	Ashanti Regional Minister; 1998 – 1999	Succeeded by Samuel Nuamah-Donkoh
