= Joyce Akoh Dei =

Ghanaian politician (born 1965)

Hon. Joyce Adwoa Akoh Dei

Member of the Ghana Parliament for Bosome-Freho
- In office 7 January 2017 – 2021
- Majority: Yes
- President: Nana Akufo-Addo

Personal details
- Born: 12 October 1964 (age 61) Asiwa, Ashanti Region, Ghana
- Party: New Patriotic Party
- Children: 3
- Occupation: Politician
- Profession: Businesswoman
- Committees: Government Assurance Committee, Food, Agriculture and Cocoa Affairs Committee

Joyce Adwoa Akoh Dei (born 12 October 1964)) is a Ghanaian politician and a member of the New Patriotic Party (NPP). She was the member of parliament for Bosome-Freho constituency in the Ashanti Region of Ghana.

== Early life and education ==
Joyce Adwoa Akoh Dei was born on 12 October 1965 in Asiwa, Ashanti Region. She holds a diploma in Christian Ministry, and an NVQ Level 3 from the National Council for Vocational Qualifications and City and Guilds 7306 from City and Guilds.

== Career ==
Akoh Dei is a businesswoman and a Ghanaian politician in the New Patriotic Party (NPP). She holds a level 3/Adult and further Education Teachers Certificate.

== Politics ==
Akoh Dei is a member of the New Patriotic Party and was the member of Parliament for Bosome-Freho constituency in the seventh parliament of the fourth republic of Ghana.

=== 2016 election ===
Akoh Dei contested the Bosome-Freho constituency parliamentary seat in the Ashanti Region on the ticket of the New Patriotic Party in the 2016 Ghanaian general election and won with 15,497 votes, representing 62.17% of the total votes.

She won the election over Nana Yaw Ofori-Kuragu (Independent) who polled 4,655 votes, equivalent to 18.68%, while parliamentary candidate for the National Democratic Congress Kwame Adarkwa had 4,550 votes, representing 18.25%, Bright Baffour Asare of the PPP polled 123 votes, representing 0.49% and the parliamentary candidate for the Convention People's Party Yeboah Samuel had 100 votes, equivalent to 0.40% of the total votes.

== Personal life ==
She is a Christian. She is divorced, with three children.
