= Joseph Amenowode =

Ghanaian politician and academic

Honourable Joseph Zaphenat Amenowode

Member of the Ghana Parliament for Hohoe South
- In office 7 January 2005 – 6 January 2013
- Preceded by: Kosi Kedem
- Succeeded by: Constituency redemarcation
- Majority: 17,851 (84.5%)

Volta Region Minister
- In office Jan 2009 – Mar 2012
- President: John Atta Mills
- Preceded by: Kofi Dzamesi
- Succeeded by: Henry Ford Kamel

Personal details
- Born: Accra
- Party: National Democratic Congress (Ghana)
- Children: 7
- Education: Kwame Nkrumah University of Science and Technology; Pratt Institute
- Occupation: Lecturer
- Committees: Committee of Privileges

Joseph Zaphenat Amenowode is a Ghanaian politician and academic. He was the member of parliament for Hohoe South and was the minister for the Volta Region of Ghana from January 2009 until his dismissal on 6 March 2012. He has worked as a university lecturer prior to going into politics.

== Early life in education ==
Amenowode's family hails from Ve-Deme in the Hohoe Municipal District of the Volta Region. He was born in Accra, the capital of Ghana. He attended the Hohoe Evangelical Presbyterian Secondary School between 1966 and 1971 obtaining the General Certificate of Education (GCE) Ordinary Level. He proceeded to Kpando Secondary School for his sixth form education, completing the GCE Advanced Level in 1973. His undergraduate university education was at the Kwame Nkrumah University of Science and Technology where he obtained the Bachelor of Arts Honours degree in 1979. He continued for an extra year to complete a postgraduate diploma in 1980. In 1991, he obtained a master's degree from the same university. He attended the Pratt Institute in New York City where he completed a Master of Professional Studies degree in Art Therapy in 1997.

== Career ==
Amenowode initially taught in the Ghana Education Service. He later became a lecturer at the University of Education, Winneba in the Central Region of Ghana.

He was the former chairman of the Parliamentary Select Committee on Employment, Social Welfare and State Enterprises.

== Politics ==
Joseph Amenowode is a member of the National Democratic Congress. He first stood for elections in the Ghanaian parliamentary election in 2004, winning with a majority of 17,720 (75.6%) and taking his seat in the fourth parliament of the Fourth Republic. He retained his seat in the 2008 election. In 2009, he was appointed the Volta Regional Minister by the President of Ghana, John Atta Mills, a position he held until he was dropped in a cabinet reshuffle by President Mills in early 2012.

== See also ==
- List of Mills government ministers
- National Democratic Congress (Ghana)
- Hohoe South

Parliament of Ghana
Preceded by Kosi Kedem	Member of Parliament for Hohoe South; 2005 – present	Incumbent
Political offices
Preceded by Kofi Dzamesi	Volta Regional Minister; 2009 – 2012	Succeeded by Henry Ford Kamel
