= Angela Alorwu-Tay =

Ghanaian politician

Angela Oforiwa Alorwu-Tay
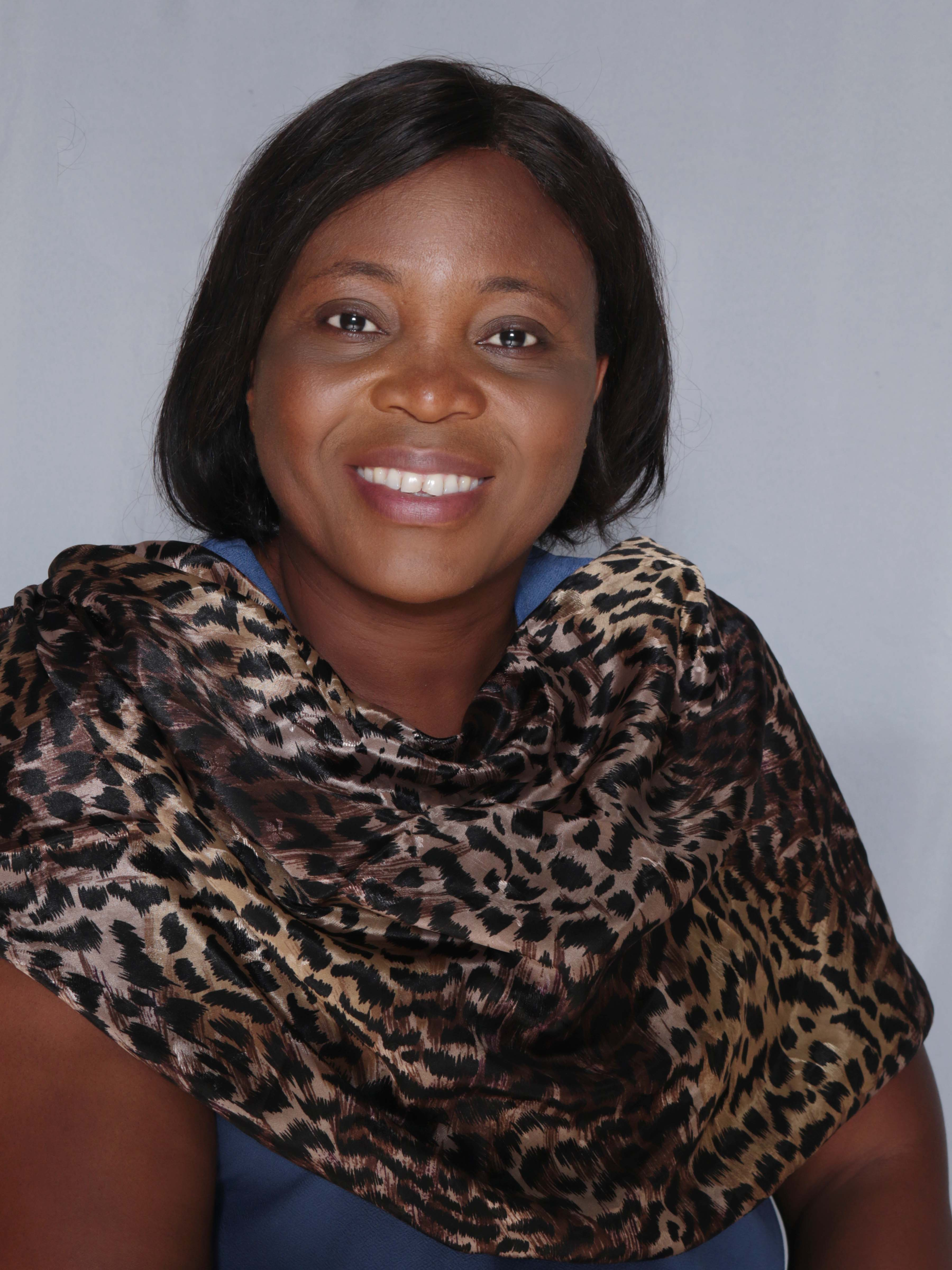

Member of the Ghana Parliament for Afadjato South
- Incumbent
- Assumed office 7 January 2017
- Preceded by: Joseph Amenowode
- Majority: 11,901

Personal details
- Born: 16 April 1971 (age 55)
- Party: National Democratic Congress
- Children: 2 children
- Education: University of Ghana, University of Cape Coast
- Occupation: MP
- Profession: Manager/administrator/hr practitioner

Angela Oforiwa Alorwu-Tay is a Ghanaian politician and member of the Seventh Parliament of the Fourth Republic of Ghana representing the Afadjato South Constituency in the Volta Region on the ticket of the National Democratic Congress (Ghana). She was one of the five women elected out of nine that contested during the 2016 general elections in the Volta Region.

== Education ==
She has a (Hons) BA from University of Ghana, a diploma from West Africa Computer Science Institute and has a GCE O'level from Nkonya Secondary School. She also has an MA degree in Democracy, Governance, Law & Development from the University of Cape Coast.

== Religion ==
Angela is a Christian.

== Personal life ==
Angela Alorwu Tay was born on 16 April 1971. She is widowed with two children.

== Politics ==
In 2015, she contested and won the NDC parliamentary seat for the Afadjato South Constituency in the Volta Region and polled 5,138 votes to beat Mr Reuben Kornu with 1,419 votes, Miss Kafui Takyi −1,366 votes, Mr Eben Kay Hodo – 820 votes, Mr Victus Agbesi with 577 votes and Miss Susie Adoboe with 559 votes. She also advocates for the gender parity issue Ghana is facing and holds the current government of Ghana to redeem his campaign promise of 30% women in his cabinet.

== Employment ==
She served as a secretary Unique Insurance CO. between the period of 1999 to 2003. She also served as a Manager at Tahnaf Service between 2004 and 2012. She added on as a District Chief Executive from 2012 to 2016.

Parliament of Ghana
Preceded by Joseph Amenowode	Member of Parliament for 2017–present	Incumbent
