= Jerry Ahmed Shaib =

Ghanaian lawyer and politician (born 1976)

- Born: 9 August 1976 (age 50)
- Occupations: Lawyer, Politician
- Political party: New Patriotic Party

Jerry Ahmed Shaib (born August 9, 1976) is a Ghanaian lawyer and politician. He was appointed by President Nana Akufo-Addo as the chief executive officer of the Coastal Development Authority.

== Early life and education ==
Jerry is a product of Keta Senior High Technical School. He holds Bachelor of Arts in Social Sciences (Economics and Sociology) from the University of Cape Coast, Bachelor of Laws and Master of Philosophy in Sociology from the University of Ghana as well as an Executive MBA in Marketing from the University of Ottawa in 2023. He was awarded a Qualifying Certificate Law by the Ghana School of Law and called to the Bar in 2010. He also had his Master of Business Administration at the University of Professional Studies at 2019.

== Career ==
Between 2005 and 2008, he worked as the Special Assistant for the former mayor of Accra, Stanley Nii Adjiri Blankson and led various change initiatives driven by the Accra Metropolitan Assembly. He also worked as Assistant to the managing Director at Crown Channel Ghana, University of Ghana, Legon as Graduate Teaching Assistant, Kuenyehia & Nutsukpui as Legal Practitioner, Coastal Development Authority as Deputy Chief Executive Officer, Korle Bu Teaching Hospital as a Board Member.

He has also represented Ghana at various for functions on behalf of the Accra Metropolitan Assembly. Most recently he attended a sustainable development program in Liverpool as Ghana's representative.

Before he was elevated to the CEO position in 2018 at CODA, he was the Deputy chief executive officer. He contested on the ticket of the New Patriotic Party for the parliamentary seat of Ablekuma South Constituency in the 2016 parliamentary elections.

=== Political career ===
Shaib is a member of New Patriotic Party and currently the Member of Parliament for Weija-Gbawe Constituency. He is also the Second Deputy Minority Whip in the Parliament of Ghana.

== Personal life ==
Shaib is a Christian born on Monday, 9 August 1976

== Controversy ==
In January 2025, Shaib was suspended by Alban Bagbin for 2 weeks after he was involved in chaos during the sitting of the Appointments Committee.
