= Della Sowah =

Ghanaian politician (born 1959)

Hon. Della Sowah
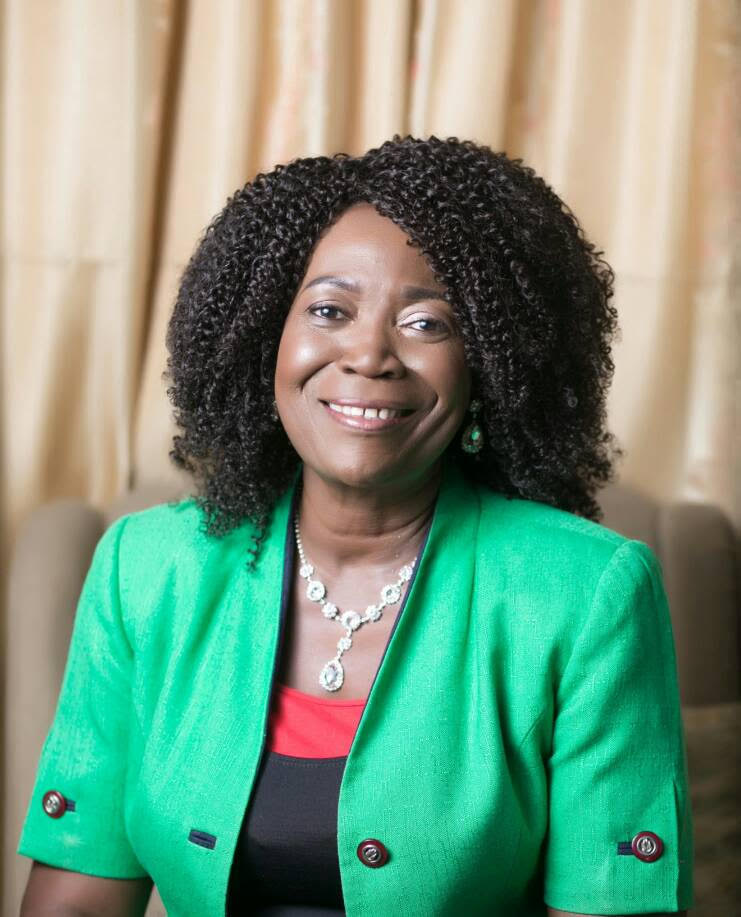

Member of the Ghana Parliament for Kpandu
- President: John Dramani Mahama
- President: John Atta Mills; John Mahama

Personal details
- Born: 23 November 1959 (age 66) Kpandu, Ghana
- Party: National Democratic Congress
- Education: Kwame Nkrumah University of Science and Technology
- Profession: Journalist, advertiser, marketer

Della Adjoa Sowah (born 23 November 1959) is a Ghanaian former Deputy Minister for Gender, Children and Social Protection. She is also the Member of Parliament for Kpando constituency.

== Early life ==
Sowah was born in Kpandu, Volta Region of Ghana on 23 November 1959.

== Education ==
Sowah earned her degree in Social Sciences from the Kwame Nkrumah University of Science and Technology in 1981. She holds a Diploma in Finance and Master of business administration.

== Career ==
- Deputy Minister
- Member of Parliament, 2012–2016 (government of Ghana)
- Partner, financial planner, 2001–2012 (Speed Masters)
- Marketing, MD, 1990–2000 (DAPEG LTD)
- Research, 1986–1990 (ESSOR LTD)

== Politics ==
Sowah is a member of National Democratic Congress and a member of parliament for Kpando ( Ghana parliament constituency) in 6th, 7th and Eighth Parliament of the Fourth Republic of Ghana.

=== 2016 election ===
Sowah contested the Kpando constituency parliamentary seat on the ticket of the National Democratic Congress during the 2016 Ghanaian general election and won with 17,318 votes, representing 82.38% of the total votes. She won the election over Djampoh Elvis Kweku of the New Patriotic Party who polled 3,058 votes which is equivalent to 14.55%, parliamentary candidate for the NDP Daniel Karl had 359 votes representing 1.71% and the parliamentary candidate for Convention People's Party Isaac Adjanya had 286 votes representing 1.36% of the total votes.

==== 2020 election ====
Sowah again contested the Kpando constituency parliamentary seat in the Volta Region on the ticket of the National Democratic Congress during the 2020 Ghanaian general election and won with 13,582 votes representing 62.29% over the parliamentary candidate for the New Patriotic Party Quist Ernest Theophilus who polled 8,221 votes which is equivalent to 37.71% of the total votes.

=== Committees ===
Sowah is a member of Mines and Energy committee, Standing Orders committee and Business committee.

== Personal life ==
Sowah is a Christian. She is married, and has three children.
