= Linda Obenewaa Akweley Ocloo =

Ghanaian politician

Hon. Linda Obenewaa Akweley Ocloo MP
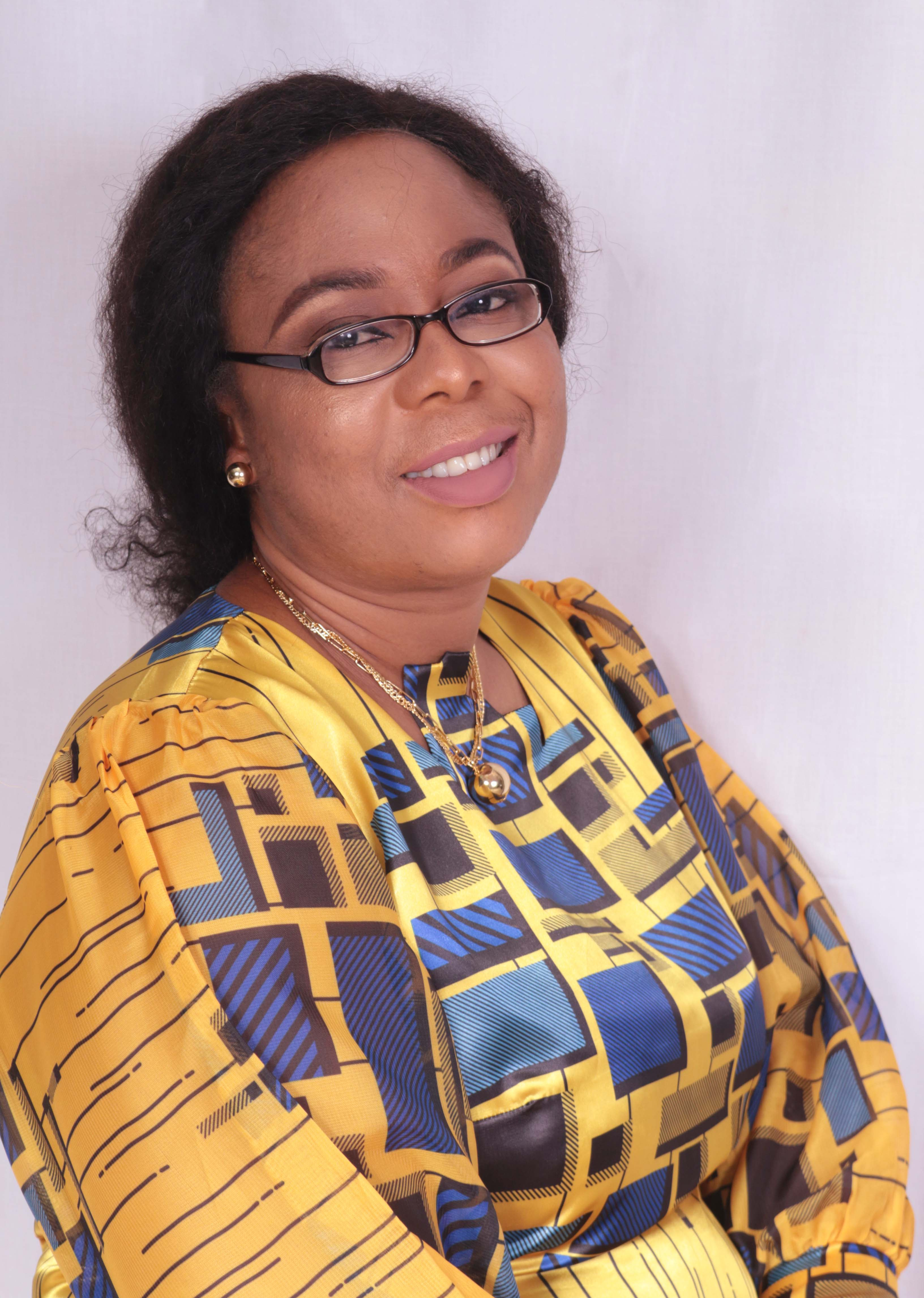

Regional Minister for Greater Accra Region
- Incumbent
- Assumed office February 2025
- President: John Mahama
- Preceded by: Henry Quartey
- Majority: 13,596

Member of Parliament for Shai-Osudoku
- Incumbent
- Assumed office 7 January 2017
- President: Nana Akuffo-Addo
- Preceded by: David Tetteh Assumeng

Personal details
- Born: Linda Obenewaa Akweley Ocloo; 21 February 1979 (age 47) Ghana
- Party: National Democratic Congress
- Education: University of Cape Coast; National Insurance College
- Occupation: Economist/banker/insurer
- Profession: Politician

Linda Obenewaa Akweley Ocloo, born on 21 February 1979 at Ayinaa Abasa, is a Ghanaian politician and member of the Seventh, eighth and ninth Parliament of the Fourth Republic of Ghana representing the Shai-Osudoku constituency in the Greater Accra Region on the ticket of the National Democratic Congress (NDC).

She is the Greater Accra Regional minister; her appointment came in January 2025 as the NDC government took over the governance of the country after winning the 2024 elections.

== Education ==
In 2000, Ocloo obtained her Diploma in Banking from the Cambridge Academy in Accra and a Business Administration (BA) from the University of Cape Coast, Ghana. She holds a diploma in insurance from the National Insurance College at Airport-Accra, which she achieved in 2004. She also has an Honoring Doctorate Degree from Elohim Theological College & Seminary in 2024 as well as an MA in Banking and Finance from the Methodist University of Ghana in 2025.

== Career ==
Ocloo is an economist, banker and an insurer by profession. She served as a Client Service Consultant at Old Mutual Assurance, formerly Provident Life Insurance.

== Politics ==
Ocloo is a member of the National Democratic Congress representing Shai-Osudoku constituency in the Greater Accra Region in the Seventh and Eighth Parliament of the Fourth Republic of Ghana.

=== 2016 election ===
Ocloo contested the Shai-Osudoku constituency parliamentary seat on the ticket of the National Democratic Congress during the 2016 Ghanaian general election, and won with 20,114 votes representing 67.07% of the total votes. She was elected over Stephen Nene Oyortey of the New Patriotic Party who polled 6,518 votes, equivalent to 21.73%, parliamentary candidate for the PPP Emmanuel Martey Tetteh had 3,203 votes representing 10.68% and the parliamentary candidate for the Convention People's Party had 154 votes ,representing 0.51% of the total votes.

=== 2020 election ===
Ocloo was re-elected as a member of parliament for Shai-Osudoku on the ticket of the National Democratic Congress during the 2020 Ghanaian general election. She was elected with 32,516 votes, representing 67.2% over the parliamentary candidate for the New Patriotic Party Benjamin Nargeh, who had 15,900 votes, representing 32.8% of the total votes.

== As the Regional Minister, Greater Accra ==
Madam Ocloo, the regional minister for the Greater Accra Region, said as part of the government's intervention in response to the flooding situation in the region, it has set 10 July 2026, for a clean-up campaign.

Madam Ocloo said all Metropolitan, Municipal and District Assemblies in the region have been assigned specific roles; there are itinerary prepared for institutions and individuals who want to participate in the campaign.

== Personal life ==
Ocloo is widowed and has five children. Her husband, Desmond William Ocloo, was the original NDC parliamentary candidate for the Shai-Osudoku constituency but died prior to the election following a road traffic collision in May 2016. The party then chose her to stand in place of her husband and she won with a majority of 13,596 votes. She is a Christian (Mission of God Church, Dodowa)

== Employment ==
Ocloo has worked at; Parliament of Ghana

1. Standard Chartered Bank as branch secretary
2. Electricity Company of Ghana as a Personal Assistant to the MD.
3. Old Mutual Assurance as client service consultant.

== Honours/Awards ==
In 2022, Ocloo was given the Award for Outstanding Female MP in Ghana by West Africa Young Leaders Awards (WAYLA) for her exceptional effective service.

Linda Ocloo, the Greater Accra Regional Minister, received the Best Regional Minister Award at the 6th Ghana Ministers of State Excellence Awards on Saturday, 6 June 2026.
