= Sheila Bartels =

Ghanaian entrepreneur and politician

Hon. Sheila Bartels
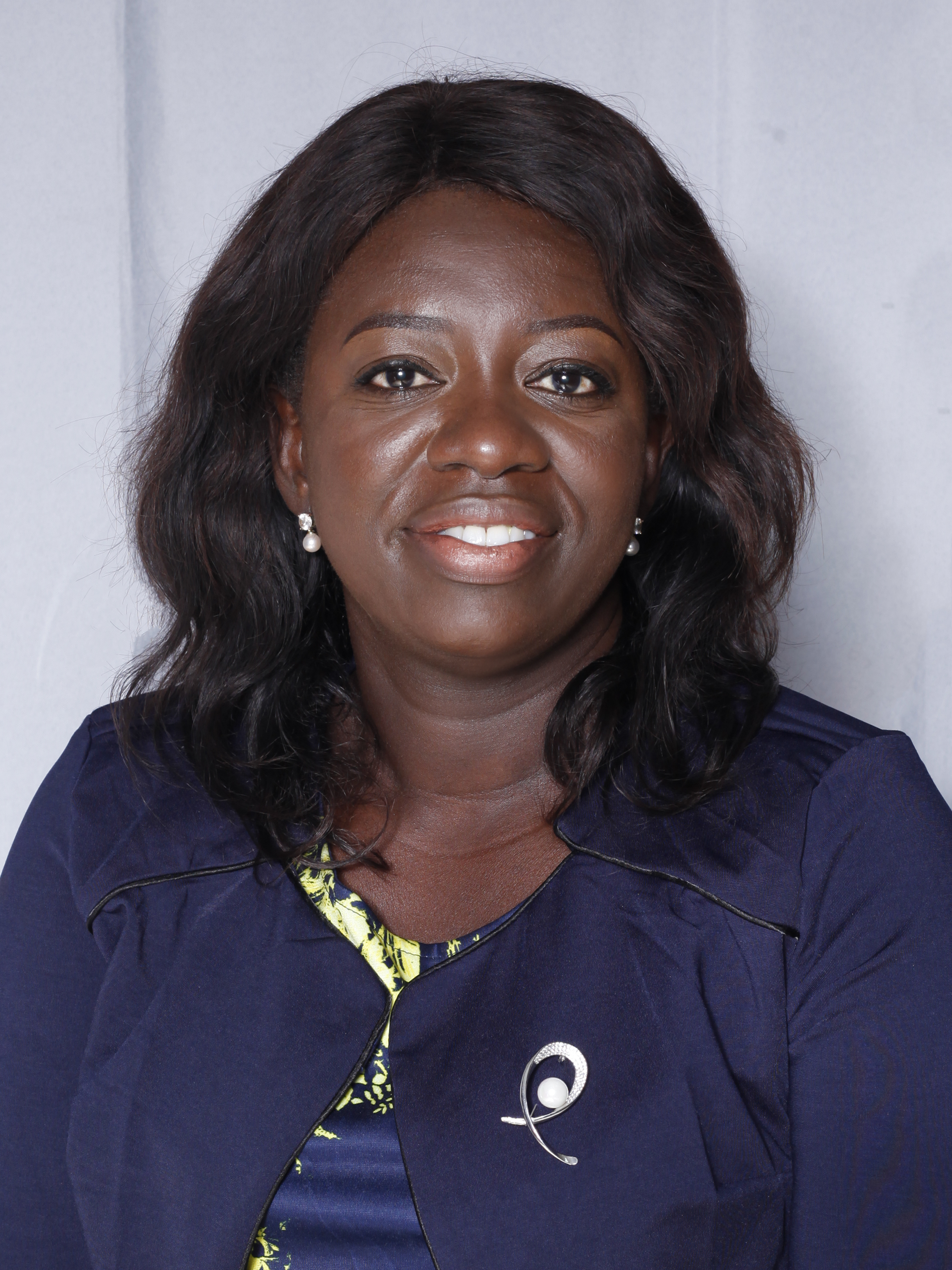

Member of Parliament for Ablekuma North Constituency
- Incumbent
- Assumed office 7 January 2021
- Preceded by: Nana Akua Owusu Afriyie

Personal details
- Party: New Patriotic Party
- Relations: Kwamena Bartels (father)

Sheila Penelope Bartels is a Ghanaian entrepreneur and politician. She contested in the 2020 Ghanaian General Election and won the parliamentary seat for Ablekuma North Constituency.

== Politics ==
Bartels is a member of the New Patriotic Party. In December 2020, she was elected member of Parliament for Ablekuma North Constituency after she competed in the 2020 Ghanaian General Election and won. She polled 54,821 votes which represents 64.26% of the total votes cast. She was elected over Ashley Mensah Winifred of the National Democratic Congress and Princess Agyemang Awuku of the Ghana Union Movement. These obtained 29,772, and 716 votes respectively out of the total valid votes cast. These were equivalent to 34.90%, and 0.84% respectively of total valid votes cast. Sheila Bartels was also a member of the parliament's Finance and Works and Housing Committees.

In the parliamentary primaries of 2024 for the NPP, she was defeated in her attempt to represent the party by Nana Akua Afriyie, a former MP of the constituency. Afriyie secured 756 votes, surpassing her opponent who received 637 votes out of the total valid votes cast.

== Personal life ==
She is the daughter of Kwamena Bartels who was also member of parliament of Ablekuma North from January 1997 to January 2009. She was born on 3 September 1975. She is from Gomoa Assin in the Central Region in Ghana. She is a Christian.
