= Ablekuma North =

Constituency in Ghana

- constituency for the Parliament of Ghana
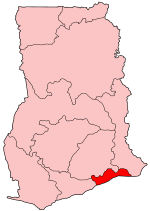
- District: Accra Metropolis District
- Region: Greater Accra Region of Ghana

Current constituency
- Party: NDC
- MP: Ewurabena Aubynn

Ablekuma North is one of the constituencies represented in the Parliament of Ghana. It elects one Member of Parliament (MP) by the first past the post system of election. Ablekuma North is located in the Accra Metropolis in the Greater Accra Region of Ghana. According to the Multidimensional Poverty Index(MPI) rankings released by the Ghana Statistical Service, Ablekuma North emerged as the top-performing district.

== Boundaries ==
The constituency also doubles as the Ablekuma North Municipal Assembly of the Greater Accra Region of Ghana. It shares boundaries with the Ablekuma Central, Ablekuma West, Okaikwei North, Okaikwei Central, Okaikwei South, Anyaa Sowutuom, and Weija Gbawe Constituencies.

== Members of Parliament ==
Election	Member	Party
1992	Adam Baako Nortey Yeboah	National Democratic Congress
1996	Kwamena Bartels	New Patriotic Party
2000	Kwamena Bartels	New Patriotic Party
2004	Kwamena Bartels	New Patriotic Party
2008	Justice Joe Appiah	New Patriotic Party
2012	Justice Joe Appiah	New Patriotic Party
2016	Nana Akua Owusu Afriyie	New Patriotic Party
2020	Sheila Penelope Bartels	New Patriotic Party
2024	Ewurabena Aubynn	National Democratic Congress

== Elections ==
2012 Ghanaian parliamentary election: Source: Ghana Home Page
Party	Candidate	Votes	%	±%
New Patriotic Party	Justice Joe Appiah			
National Democratic Congress	Ras Mubarak			
Independent	Nana Kwame Minimsaah			
Progressive People's Party	Ishmael Paakwesi Longdon			
Convention People's Party	Odartey Mills			
People's National Convention	Ali Awudu			
National Democratic Party	Nana Antwi - Boasiako			
Majority				
Turnout		—	—	—

2008 Ghanaian parliamentary election: Source: Ghana Home Page
Party	Candidate	Votes	%	±%
New Patriotic Party	Justice Joe Appiah	45,630	57.6	−7.8
National Democratic Congress	Ashford Tawiah Smith	30,150	38.1	+5.4
Convention People's Party	Ernest Kweku Ortsin	1,512	1.9	+1.0
Independent	Doris Osei Frimpong	1,165	1.5	+1.1
People's National Convention	Bala S. Maikankan	772	1.0	+0.3
Majority		15,480	19.5	−13.2
Turnout		—	—	—

2004 Ghanaian parliamentary election: Ablekuma North Source:Electoral Commission of Ghana
Party	Candidate	Votes	%	±%
New Patriotic Party	Kwamena Bartels	55,999	65.4	−3.8
National Democratic Congress	Ashford Tawiah Smith	27,988	32.7	+4.1
Convention People's Party	Benjamin Agbo	769	0.9	−1.3
People's National Convention	Bala S. Maikankan	612	0.7	—
Independent	Kow Asare Nyarko	304	0.4	—
Majority		28,011	32.7	−7.9
Turnout		85,926	84.7	—

2000 Ghanaian parliamentary election: Ablekuma North Source:Adam Carr's Election Archives
Party	Candidate	Votes	%	±%
New Patriotic Party	Kwamena Bartels	34,508	69.2	—
National Democratic Congress	Albert Okpoti Botchway	14,236	28.6	—
Convention People's Party	Doreen Naadjah Sackey	1,092	2.2	—
Majority		20,272	40.6	—
Turnout				—

1996 Ghanaian parliamentary election: Ablekuma North Source:Electoral Commission of Ghana
Party	Candidate	Votes	%	±%
New Patriotic Party	Kwamena Bartels	35,747	61.1	—
National Democratic Congress	Denanyoh Ben Mensah	20,214	34.5	—
National Convention Party	Nathaniel Addo	2,559	4.4	—
Majority		15,553	26.6	—
Turnout		58,520	77.3	—

== See also ==
- List of Ghana Parliament constituencies
