= Abena Osei Asare =

Ghanaian politician (born 1979)

Hon. Abena Osei-Asare
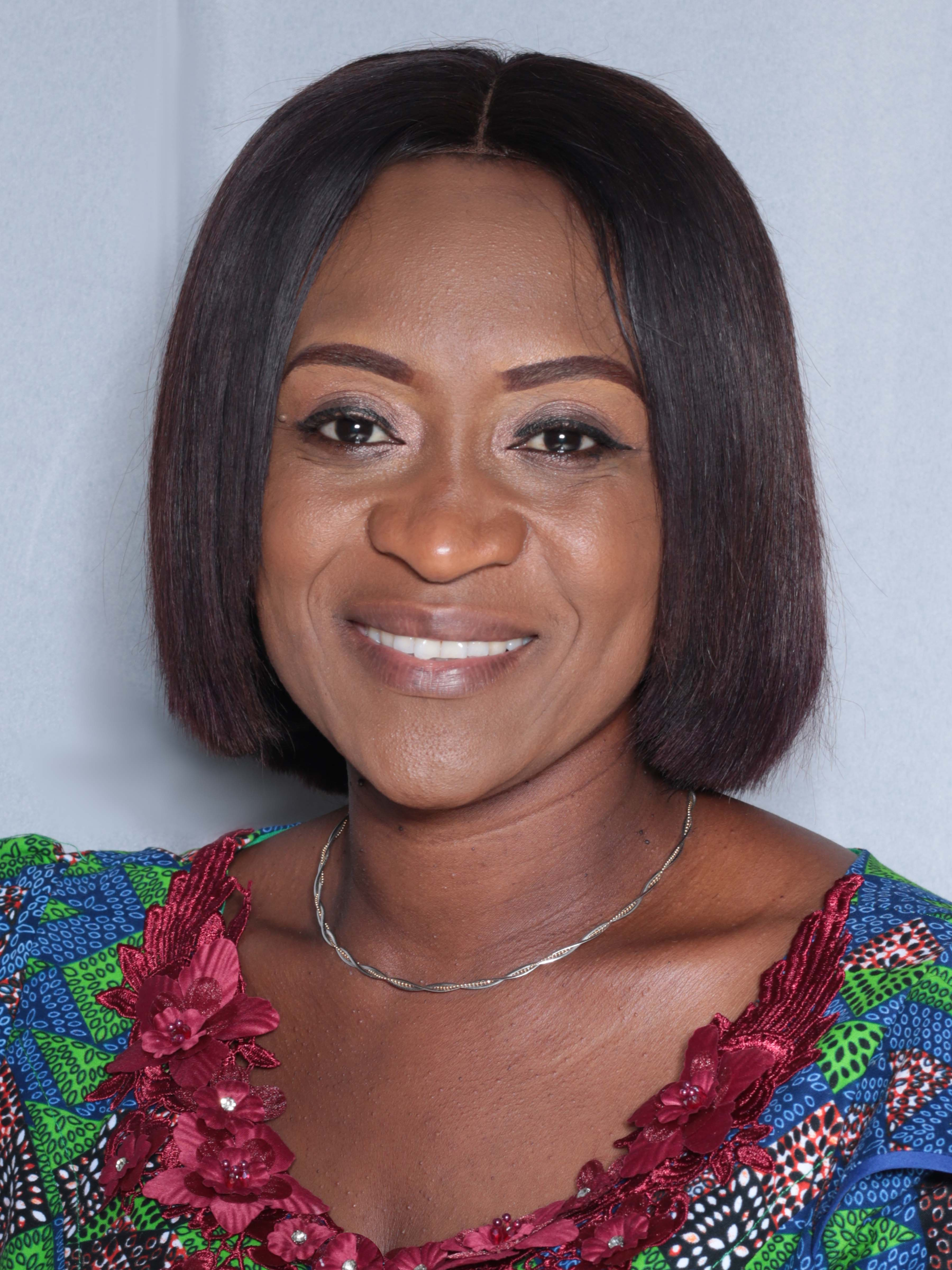
- Osei-Asare in 2021

Member of Parliament for Atiwa East constituency
- Incumbent
- Assumed office 2012
- President: Nana Akufo-Addo

Personal details
- Born: 16 January 1979 (age 47)
- Party: New Patriotic Party
- Education: University of Ghana
- Profession: Accountant and financial officer

Abena Osei-Asare (born 16 January 1979) is a Ghanaian politician, chartered accountant, and currently a Member of Parliament for Atiwa East in the Eastern Region of Ghana. She served as a Deputy Finance Minister from 2017 to 2025. She worked at the New York University as the Assistant Director between 2004 and 2007 and also as Customer Team Leader from 2007 to 2009 and also as Dealer for the Treasury Department from 2009 to 2012 both at Barclays Bank Ghana Limited.

== Early life and education ==
Abena Osei Asare attended Achimota Primary School and continue her secondary education at Wesley Girls High School-Cape-Coast (1995–97) where she read General Arts with elective subjects as Economics, Geography and Elective Mathematics.

She later acquired her tertiary education from the University of Ghana where she studied Economics and Geography and completed in 2003. She holds a B.A. (Hons.) in Economics with Geography from the University of Ghana and an Msc. Development Finance from the University of Ghana Business School.

She became a member of the Association of Chartered Certified Accountants (ACCA) in 2009 and later a fellow in 2014. Also, her membership extends to the Institute of Chartered Accountants Ghana (ICAG).

She also has a certificate in Dealing from ACI (Financial Markets Association).

== Career ==
Abena Osei-Asare upon completion of her first degree did her national service at the President's Special Initiative on Textiles and Garments under President John Agyekum Kufuor.

She proceeded to work as the assistant director for Facilities and Finance at the New York University, Accra in Ghana between the period of (2004 and 2007).

She continued her career at Absa Bank [then Barclays Bank Ghana] and served as a customer team lead in the retail department between 2007-2009. She took a dealer role for the Treasury Department between 2009–2012.

In the year 2000 she became a member of the New Patriotic Party and it was on the ticket of this political party that she contested for the Member of Parliament of the then newly created constituency Atiwa East (Eastern Region) during the 2012 parliamentary elections.

== Politics ==
Abena contested and won the New Patriotic Party parliamentary seat for Atiwa East Constituency in the Eastern Region of Ghana in 2012. She won the seat again during the 2016 Ghanaian general elections. She contested against one other candidate namely, Asante Foster of the National Democratic Congress.

Abena won the election by obtaining 17,399 votes of the 22,486 cast, representing 77.81 percent of total valid votes.

As a Member of Parliament, she actively participated in the business of parliament as a representative of the people of Atiwa East. She served on the Finance Committee, Public Accounts Committee, and Employment and Social Welfare and State Enterprises Committee in Parliament and has played a key role in passing legislation and agreements as well as interrogating auditees on the Annual Auditor General's Report. Again, she was also a board member of the Prestigious Parliamentary Service Board (PSB).

At the Ministry of Finance, her schedule included acting as intermediary between the Ministry and Parliament in terms of loan agreements, bills and annual National budget. As the Deputy Minister in charge of budget, she, acting under the Minister of Finance, supported in the preparation and implementation of the government budget under the first four years of H.E. Nana Addo Dankwa Akufo-Addo.

She has also represented the Minister at various international conferences including the UN meetings on SDGs and ILO on labour issues. In terms of Corporate Governance, She represented the Ministry of Finance as a Director on the following boards; ADB BANK, SSNIT, NHIA and GIADEC.

The 2024 general elections

She garnered 17,501 votes, representing 66.38% of the total 26,364 votes cast

== Personal life ==
Abena is a Christian who fellowships at the Presbyterian church. She is married with three children. She also runs an NGO, The Waterbrook Foundation which supports brilliant but needy students with their Education.

== See also ==
- MPs elected in the Ghanaian parliamentary election, 2012
- New Patriotic Party
