= Gomoa Central (Ghana parliament constituency) =

Constituency in the Central Region of Ghana

Gomoa central
- constituency for the Parliament of Ghana
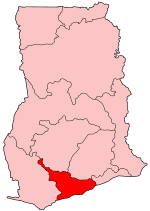
- District: Gomoa Central District
- Region: Central Region of Ghana

Current constituency
- Created: 2016
- Party: Independent
- MP: Kwame Asare Obeng

Kwame Asare Obeng is the member of parliament-elect for the constituency, succeeding Naana Eyiah who was elected on the ticket of the New Patriotic Party (Ghana)|New Patriotic Party (NPP) in 2020 and won a majority of 14,178 votes to become the MP. She succeeded Rachel Florence Appoh who had represented the constituency in the same year on the ticket of the National Democratic Congress (NDC) with minority votes of 12,858.

== Members of Parliament ==
Period	Member	Party
2012 - 2016	Rachel N. A. Appoh	National Democratic Congress
2016 - 2025	Naana Eyiah	New Patriotic Party
2025 - 2028	Kwame Asare Obeng	Independent Candidate

== Boundaries ==
The seat is within the Gomoaman Traditional area and shares boundaries with Gomoa East and Gomoa West Districts and Agona West Municipal all in the Central Region of Ghana.
