= Atiwa East (Ghana parliament constituency) =

Constituency in the Eastern Region of Ghana

Atiwa East Constituency
- constituency for the Parliament of Ghana
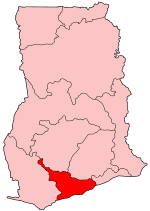
- District: Atiwa District
- Region: Eastern Region(Ghana) of Ghana

Current constituency
- Party: New Patriotic Party
- MP: Abena Osei Asare

Atiwa East is one of the constituencies represented in the Parliament of Ghana. It elects one Member of Parliament (MP) by the first past the post system of election. The Atiwa East constituency is located in the Atiwa district of the Eastern Region of Ghana.

== Boundaries ==
The seat is located entirely within the Atiwa district of the Eastern Region of Ghana.

== Members of Parliament ==
Election	Member	Party
2008	Kwasi Annch	New Patriotic Party
2012	Abena Osei Asare	New Patriotic Party
2016	Abena Osei Asare	New Patriotic Party

== Elections ==
Abena Osei Asare the current MP for the Atiwa East constituency.

== See also ==
- List of Ghana Parliament Constituencies
- Atiwa District
