= Kpando (Ghana parliament constituency) =

Ghana parliament constituency

- constituency for the Parliament of Ghana
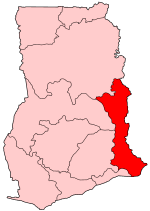
- District: Kpando District
- Region: Volta Region of Ghana

Current constituency
- Party: National Democratic Congress
- MP: Sebastian Fred Deh

Kpando is one of the constituencies represented in the Parliament of Ghana. It elects one Member of Parliament (MP) by the first past the post system of election. Sebastian Fred Deh is the member of parliament for the constituency. The Kpando constituency is located in the Kpando District of the Volta Region of Ghana.

== Boundaries ==
The seat is located entirely within the Kpando District of the Volta Region of Ghana.

== Members of Parliament ==
First elected	Member	Party
1965	Regina Asamany	Convention People's Party
New constituency
2012	Della Sowah	National Democratic Congress
2024	Sebastian Fred Deh	National Democratic Congress

== Elections ==
2024 Ghanaian general election: Kpando
Party	Candidate	Votes	%	±%
NDC	Sebastian Fred Deh	18,326	73.56	+24.10
Independent	Kodzosika Samuel	4,914	19.73	−10.21
NPP	Antoinette Abena Oklu	1,672	6.71	−3.46
Majority		13,412	53.83	+34.31
Turnout		25,032	—	—
Registered electors		—		

2020 Ghanaian general election: Kpando
Party	Candidate	Votes	%	±%
NDC	Adjoa Della Sowah	13,582	49.46	−32.92
Independent	Kodzosika Samuel	8,228	29.94	—
Independent	Nyagbe Isaac Newton	2,887	10.44	—
NPP	Quist Ernest Theophilus	2,792	10.17	−4.38
Majority		5,354	19.52	−48.31
Turnout		—	—	—
Registered electors		—		

2016 Ghanaian parliamentary election: North Dayi Source: Ghana Web
Party	Candidate	Votes	%	±%
National Democratic Congress	Della Sowah	17,318	82.38	+3.27
New Patriotic Party	Elvis Kwaku Djampoh	3,058	14.55	+5.07
National Democratic Party	Daniel Karl	359	1.71	+0.93
Convention People's Party	Isaac Adjanya	286	1.36	+0.91
Majority		14,260	67.83	−1.11
Turnout		21,021		—

2012 Ghanaian parliamentary election: North Dayi Source: Ghana Web
Party	Candidate	Votes	%	±%
National Democratic Congress	Della Sowah	19,243	79.11	—
Independent	Richard Akplotsyi	2,474	10.17	—
New Patriotic Party	Theresa Akosua Sewa Tettey	2,307	9.48	—
National Democratic Party	Nelson Selorm Agbo	190	0.78	—
Convention People's Party	Emmanuel Mawusi Dzakpa	110	0.45	—
Majority		16,769	68.94	—
Turnout		24,324		—

== See also ==
- List of Ghana Parliament constituencies
- List of political parties in Ghana
