= Afadjato South =

Constituency in Ghana

- constituency for the Parliament of Ghana
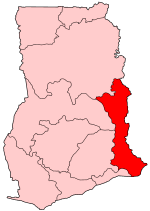
- District: Afadzato South District
- Region: Volta Region of Ghana

Current constituency
- Created: 2012
- Party: National Democratic Congress
- MP: Frank Afriyie

Afadjato South is one of the constituencies represented in the Parliament of Ghana. It elects one Member of Parliament (MP) by the first past the post system of election. Frank Afriyie is the member of parliament for the constituency. Afadjato South is located in the Afadzato South district of the Volta Region of Ghana. It was created in 2012 by the Electoral Commission of Ghana prior to the Ghanaian general election.

== Boundaries ==
The constituency is located within the Afadzato South District of the Volta Region of Ghana.

== Members of Parliament ==
First elected	Member	Party
2012	Constituency created	
2012	Joseph Zaphanat Amenowode	National Democratic Congress
2016	Angela Alorwu-Tay	National Democratic Congress
2024	Frank Afriyie	National Democratic Congress

The first ever election was held in December 2012 as part of the Ghanaian elections. The National Democratic Congress candidate won the seat with an 18,245 majority. The NDC retained its seat in the 2016 Ghanaian general election.

== Elections ==
2024 Ghanaian general election: Afadjato South
Party	Candidate	Votes	%	±%
NDC	Frank Afriyie	20,618	82.65	+10.82
NPP	James Etornam Flolu	3,459	13.87	−14.30
Liberal Party of Ghana	Tegbey Tracy Semanu	869	3.48	—
Majority		17,159	68.78	+25.12
Turnout		25,083		
Registered electors				

2020 Ghanaian general election: Afadjato South
Party	Candidate	Votes	%	±%
NDC	Angela Alorwu-Tay	19,577	71.83	−11.86
NPP	James Etornam Flolu	7,676	28.17	+14.71
NDP	Yaw Kumah Edem Bankas NDP	218	0.8	—
Majority		11,901	43.66	−26.57
Turnout		27,253		
Registered electors		35,228		

2016 Ghanaian general election: Afadjato South
Party	Candidate	Votes	%	±%
NDC	Angela Oforiwa Alorwu-Tay	19,486	83.69	−0.64
NPP	Seneadza Semanu Wisdom	3,133	13.46	−1.03
PPP	Fia Kwesi Hanson	612	2.63	—
CPP	George Kofi Kotoku	53	0.23	−1.67
Majority		16,353	70.23	+0.39
Turnout		23,284	—	—

2012 Ghanaian parliamentary election: Afadjato South
Party	Candidate	Votes	%	±%
NDC	Joseph Zaphanat Amenowode	22,029	84.33	—
NPP	Emma Millicent Kartey Kofiedu	3,784	14.49	—
CPP	Constant Yao Kumah Gidi	310	1.9	—
Majority		18,245	69.84	—
Turnout		26,123	—	—

== See also ==
- List of Ghana Parliament constituencies
- Hohoe South
