= Queenstar Pokuah Sawyerr =

Ghanaian politician

Hon. Queenster Maame Pokuah Sawyerr
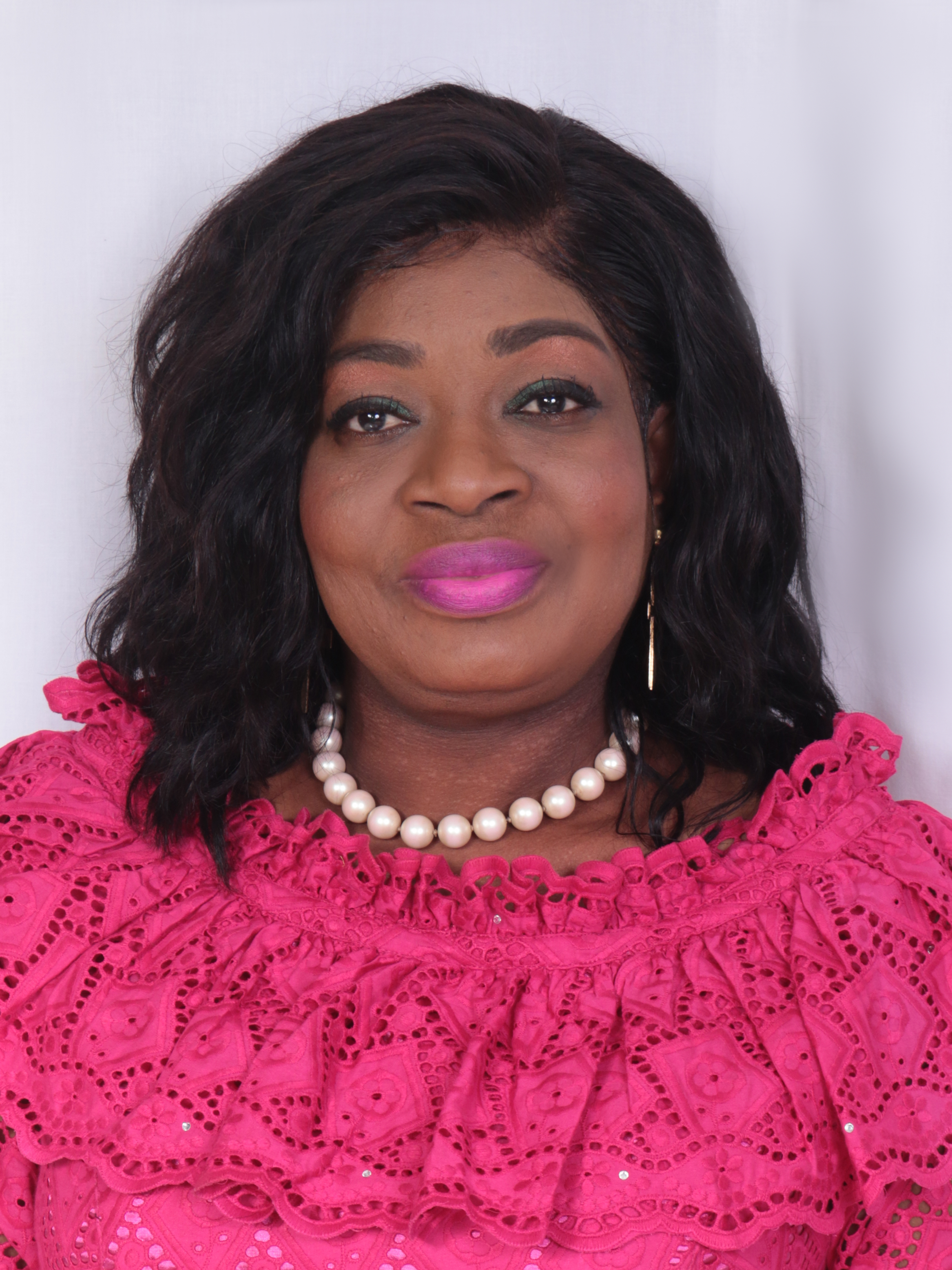

Member of Parliament for Agona East Constituency
- In office 2013–present

Deputy Central Regional Minister
- In office 2013–2017
- President: John Dramani Mahama

Personal details
- Born: 1 July 1964 (age 62) Agona Kwanyako, Central Region, Ghana
- Party: NDC
- Education: Accra Polytechnic, Atlantic International University
- Occupation: Politician
- Profession: Businesswoman
- Committees: Youth, Sports and Culture Committee; Public Accounts Committee; Education Committee

Queenstar Maame Pokua Sawyerr (born 1 July 1964) is a Ghanaian politician and the former deputy Central Regional Minister of Ghana. She has been the member of parliament of the Agona East Constituency since 2013.

== Early life and education ==
Sawyerr was born on 1 July 1964 and hails from Agona Kwanyako in the Central Region of Ghana. She received her higher national diploma from Accra Polytechnic and received a bachelor's degree in Business Administration and master's in Public Administration from Atlantic International University. Atlantic International University is an unaccredited distance learning institution that has been characterized as a degree mill, and its degrees have been widely dismissed as "fake."

== Career ==
Sawyerr is a business woman. She was CEO of Queenstar Real Estates Company Limited before assuming her position as a member of parliament.

== Politics ==
Sawyerr is the member of the National Democratic Congress. She is currently the Member of parliament for Agona East Constituency in the Central Region of Ghana.

=== 2020 elections ===
In the 2020 Ghanaian general elections, Sawyerr won the Agona East parliamentary seat with 23,247 votes making 50.6% of the total votes cast whilst the NPP parliamentary candidate Kwesi Yankah had 22,292 votes making 48.5% of the total votes cast and the LPG parliamentary candidate Samuel Aryeequaye had 204 votes making 0.4% of the total votes cast, the CPP parliamentary candidate Appiah Kubi Sharfiu had 139 votes making 0.3% of the total votes cast and an Independent parliamentary candidate Anthony Adjetey Adjei had 97 votes making 0.2% of the total votes cast.

=== 2024 election ===
She retained the seat as MP for Agona East Constituency on the ticket of the NDC with a total vote of 23,247 whiles her contender had 22,292 votes.

=== Committees ===
Sawyerr is a member of the Youth, Sports and Culture Committee; a member of the Public Accounts Committee; and also, a member of the Education Committee.

== Personal life ==
Sawyerr is married with four children. She is a Christian and worships as an Anglican.

== Philanthropy ==
For over 10 years, Sawyerr developed the Maame Pokua Loan Scheme (MPLS) to distribute money and support women traders in her constituency. The scheme is an interest free loan aimed to cushion women to expand their businesses.

In 2014, she presented mathematical sets to over 1400 students in her constituency who wrote the BECE.

In 2017, she also organized health screening for the widows and elderly at Gomoa Adzentum in the Gomoa East Constituency in the Central Region.

In 2017, she presented food items to Muslims in Agona East Constituency during the month of Ramadan.

In 2018, she also presented building materials and desks to about five schools in the Agona East Constituency. Also Hon. Saywerr presented 20 bags of cement and three packets of roofing sheets for the completion of a three-unit classroom block at the Agona Kwanyako SDA Primary School.

== Controversy ==
In October 2020, Sawyerr was banned from campaigning on the land of Agona by Nana Kojo Amuakwa V (the Chief of Agona Duakwa). She allegedly claimed to have paid the chief some amount of money for a project which the chief denied.
