= Weija (Ghana parliament constituency) =

Ghana parliament constituency

Weija-Gbawe
- constituency for the Parliament of Ghana
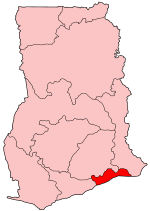
- District: Ga West District
- Region: Greater Accra Region of Ghana

Current constituency
- Party: New Patriotic Party
- MP: Jerry Ahmed Shaib

Weija constituency (now defunct) is a precursor constituency which was demarcated into three new constituencies – Anyaa-Sowutuom, Bortianor-Ngleshie-Amanfrom, and Weija-Gbawe ahead of the Ghanaian 2012 general elections . It no longer has a representation in the Parliament of Ghana and does not elect a Member of Parliament (MP) as the new name is Weija-Gbawe. The former Weija is located in the Ga West District of the Greater Accra Region of Ghana.

== Members of Parliament ==
Election	Member	Party
2004	Shirley Ayorkor Botchwey	New Patriotic Party
2008	Shirley Ayorkor Botchwey	New Patriotic Party
2012	Rosemund Comfort Abrah	New Patriotic Party
2016	Tina Gifty Naa Ayeley Mensah	New Patriotic Party
2020	Tina Gifty Naa Ayeley Mensah	New Patriotic Party
2024	Jerry Ahmed Shaib	New Patriotic Party

== Elections ==
MPs elected in the Ghanaian parliamentary election, 2008:Weija Source: Ghana Home Page
Party	Candidate	Votes	%	±%
New Patriotic Party	Shirley Ayorkor Botchway	63,371	53.7	—
National Democratic Congress	Sheriff Nii Otto Dodoo	51,961	44.1	—
Convention People's Party	Osman Ahmed Okyere CPP 2105 1.8	2,105	1.8	—
Democratic Freedom Party	Joshua Nee Sackey Oku	358	0.3	—
Democratic People's Party	Isaac Nii Otoo Otoo	113	0.1	—
Majority		12,410	9.6	—
Turnout		—	—	—

== See also ==
- List of Ghana Parliament constituencies
