= Agona East (Ghana parliament constituency) =

Constituency in the Central Region of Ghana

- constituency for the Parliament of Ghana
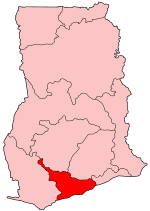
- District: Agona East District
- Region: Central Region of Ghana

Current constituency
- Party: National Democratic Congress
- MP: Queenstar Pokuah Sawyerr

Agona East (//) is one of the constituencies represented in the Parliament of Ghana. It elects one Member of Parliament (MP) by the first past the post system of election. Agona East is located in the Agona East district of the Central Region of Ghana.

== Boundaries ==
The seat is located entirely within the Agona East district of the Central Region of Ghana.

== Members of Parliament ==
First elected	Member	Party
1992	Kojo Acquah Yankah	National Democratic Congress
2000	Kweku Adu Yeboah	National Democratic Congress
2004	John Agyabeng	New Patriotic Party
2012	Queenstar Pokuah Sawyerr	National Democratic Congress

== Elections ==
2008 Ghanaian parliamentary election: Agona East Source:Ghana Home Page
Party	Candidate	Votes	%	±%
New Patriotic Party	John Agyabeng	15,125	49.6	−8.0
National Democratic Congress	Theophilus Fuseini Maranga	15,091	49.5	
Democratic Freedom Party	Magnus Idan	253	0.8	—
Majority		34	0.1	−33.8
Turnout				—

2004 Ghanaian parliamentary election: Agona East Source:Electoral Commission of Ghana
Party	Candidate	Votes	%	±%
New Patriotic Party	John Agyabeng	18,030	57.6	13.1
Independent	Theophilus Fuseini Maranga	7,427	23.7	—
National Democratic Congress	Kweku Adu Yeboah	5,515	17.6	−28.3
People's National Convention	Stephen Kwame Nkrumah	339	1.1	0.3
Majority		10,603	33.9	32.5
Turnout				—

2000 Ghanaian parliamentary election: Agona East Source:Adam Carr's Election Archives
Party	Candidate	Votes	%	±%
National Democratic Congress	Kweku Adu Yeboah	10,989	45.9	−8.2
New Patriotic Party	John Agyabeng	10,664	44.5	9.6
National Reform Party	Kofi Anane Adjei	1,816	7.6	—
Convention People's Party	Joseph Kodjo Duodu	268	1.1	—
People's National Convention	Isaiah Kwame Asante	199	0.8	−0.8
Majority		325	1.4	−17.8
Turnout		—	—	—

1996 Ghanaian parliamentary election: Agona East Source:Electoral Commission of Ghana
Party	Candidate	Votes	%	±%
National Democratic Congress	Kojo Yankah	13,336	54.1	—
New Patriotic Party	Yeboah Alex Duodu	8,605	34.9	—
National Convention Party	James Kweku Mensah	1,843	7.5	—
People's Convention Party	Kofi Owusu	470	1.9	—
People's National Convention	Martin Kobina Nkum	398	1.6	—
Majority		4,731	19.2	—
Turnout		25,329	82.5	55.7

1992 Ghanaian parliamentary election: Agona East Source:Electoral Commission of Ghana
Party	Candidate	Votes	%	±%
National Democratic Congress	Kojo Yankah			—
Majority				—
Turnout		7,825	26.8	—

== See also ==
- List of Ghana Parliament constituencies
