= Bosome-Freho (Ghana parliament constituency) =

Constituency in the Ashanti Region of Ghana

- constituency for the Parliament of Ghana
- District: Bosome Freho District
- Region: Ashanti Region of Ghana

Current constituency
- Party: New Patriotic Party
- MP: Nana Asafo-Adjei Ayeh

Bosome-Freho is one of the constituencies represented in the Parliament of Ghana. It elects one Member of Parliament (MP) by the first past the post system of election. Nana Asafo-Adjei Ayeh is the current member of parliament (MP) for the constituency. He was elected on his own ticket and won a majority of 1,076 votes to become the MP. He had also represented the constituency in the 4th Republic parliament.

== See also ==
- List of Ghana Parliament constituencies
