= Cynthia Mamle Morrison =

Ghanaian politician (b. 1964)

Hon. Cynthia Mamle Morrison MP
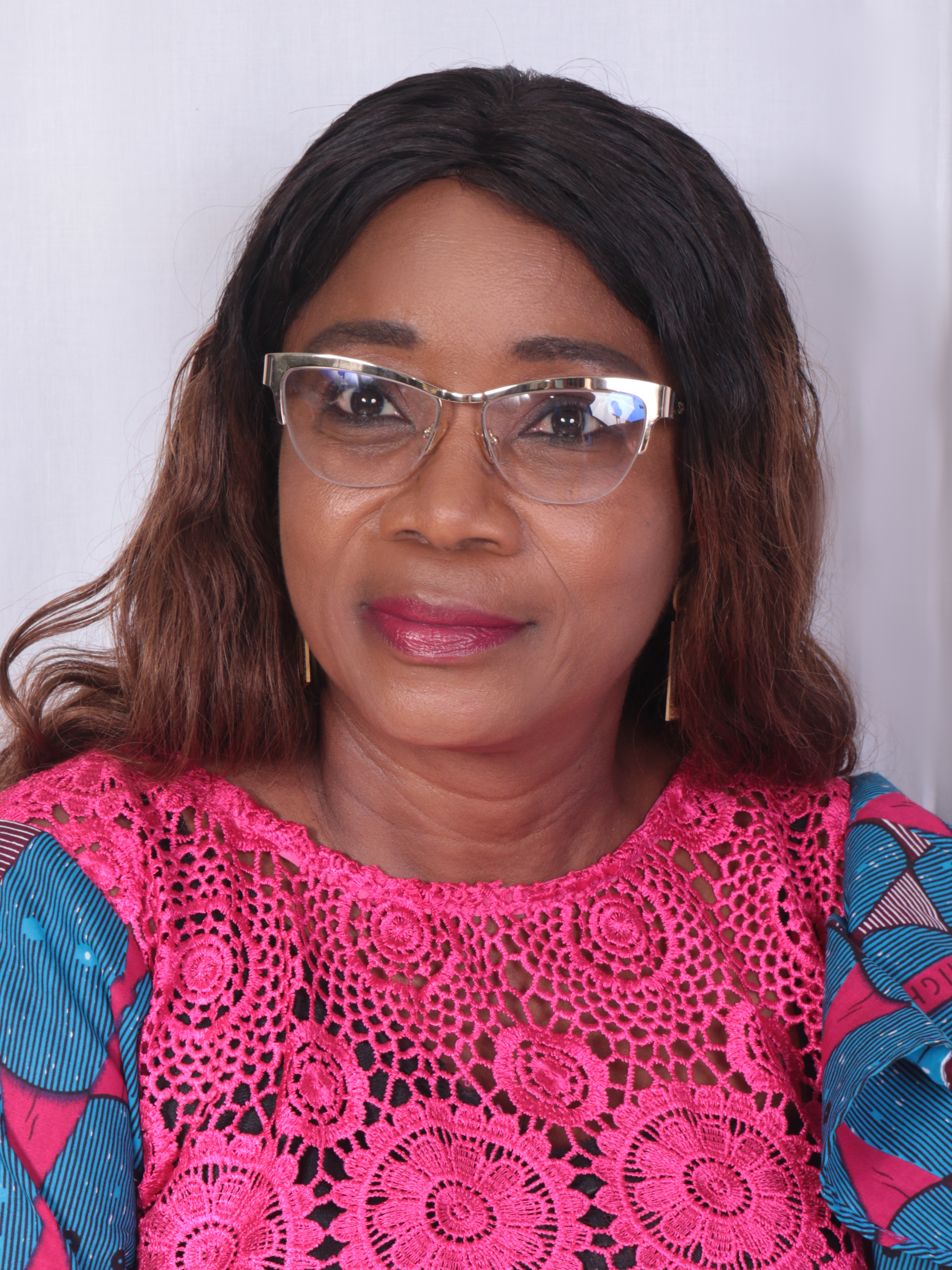

Member of the Ghana Parliament for Agona West constituency
- Incumbent
- Assumed office 7 January 2017

Minister of Gender, Children & Social Protection
- In office 8 August 2018 – 6 January 2021
- President: Nana Akuffo-Addo

Personal details
- Born: Cynthia Mamle Morrison; 17 January 1964 (age 62) Elmina, Central Region, Ghana
- Party: New Patriotic Party
- Children: seven
- Education: Maria Montessori Training School
- Occupation: Politician
- Profession: Educationist
- Committees: Government Assurance Committee (Chairperson); Communications Committee (Chairperson)

Cynthia Mamle Morrison (born 17 January 1964) is a Ghanaian politician from Elimina. She started her career in education and child care, leading her to establish her own school and later trained in Montessori education. She was a member of parliament representing Agona West Constituency for the New Patriotic Party until she announced her independent candidacy for the 2024 General Elections. On 9 August 2018, she was appointed Minister designate for Gender, Children and Social Protection by President Nana Akufo-Addo.

== Early life and education ==
Cynthia Morrison was born on 17 January 1964 in Elmina in the Central Region. She acquired a Teacher Training Certificate at Maria Montessori Training School in 1992 and also in Hepziba Montessori. She also has certificates in catering from Flair Catering.

== Career ==
She was the executive director and a Manager of her own company. She was also the Proprietress of Maryland Montessori in Dansoman. She was the Minister for Gender, Children and Social Protection.

== Philanthropy ==
Cynthia Morrison donated items including wheel chairs, walking coaches for the blind and crutches as part of her 52nd birthday celebration.

== Politics ==
Cynthia Mamle Morrison is a Ghanaian politician and was a member of the New Patriotic Party. She is currently the Member of parliament for Agona West Constituency in the Central Region.

=== 2016 elections ===
She won this seat during the 2016 Ghanaian general elections. Two other candidates namely Charles Obeng-Inkoom of National Democratic Congress and Evans Idan Coffie of Convention People's Party also contested in the 2016 by-election of the Agona West constituency held in 2016. Cynthia won the election by obtaining 32,770 votes out of the 56,878 cast, representing 58.03 percent of total valid votes.

=== 2020 elections ===
She contested the 2020 Ghanaian general election as the parliamentary candidate for the New Patriotic Party and was elected for a second four-year term. She polled 30,513 out of a total of 59,193 valid votes cast as against Paul Ofori-Amoah of the opposition National Democratic Congress who had 27,673 votes, and an independent candidate Ishmael Kofi Tekyi Turkson had 1,007 votes.

=== 2024 elections ===
Cynthia Mamle Morrison's eligibility to contest Agona west as an independent parliamentary candidate was in limbo as a District Magistrate court in Agona Swedru,was issued an injunction against her candidacy. the court ordered that Cynthia Mamle Morrison should refrain from any actions regarding the nomination process for the position of Member of pariliament for Agona West Constituency.

=== Committees ===
She is the Chairperson of the Government Assurance Committee and also the Chairperson of the Communications Committee.

=== Ministerial appointment ===
In 2018, the then President of Ghana, Nana Akufo-Addo appoint her as the minister-designate for Gender, Children, and Social Protection. She was subsequently confirmed and served in this position until January, 2021.

== Independent candidacy ==
In April 2024, Cynthia lost the primary elections for the Agona West Constituency to Chris Arthur. Despite a court injunction, she announced her decision to contest for the seat of Agona West constituency as an independent candidate forfeiting her membership to the New Patriotic Party. In October 2024, her decision to go independent was speculated in the media to have been rescinded by a section of the media after a picture of her and the New Patriotic Party leader in parliament, Alexander Afenyo-Markin went viral. However, she clarified that she will still contest as an independent candidate.

=== Attack ===
The incident occurred as supporters of Cynthia Morrison were returning from a mini-campaign launch in Otinkorang to Agona Swedru. A shot was fired into the crowd, causing panic and injuries. One person sustained gunshot wounds, while several others suffered minor injuries during the chaotic scene.

== Personal life ==
She is married to Herbert Morrison, with seven children. She is a Christian.
