= Agona West (Ghana parliament constituency) =

Constituency in the Central Region of Ghana

- constituency for the Parliament of Ghana
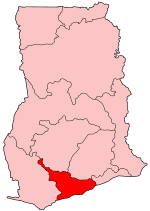
- District: Agona District
- Region: Central Region of Ghana

Current constituency
- Party: National Democratic Congress
- MP: Ernestina Ofori Dangbey

Agona West (//) is one of the constituencies represented in the Parliament of Ghana. It elects one member of parliament (MP) by the first past the post system of election. Agona West constituency is located in the Agona district of the Central Region of Ghana. The current MP for Agona West constituency is Mrs. Ernestina Ofori Dangbey.

== Boundaries ==
The seat is located entirely within the Agona district of the Central Region of Ghana.

== Members of Parliament ==
Election	Member	Party
1992	John Oscar Bimpong	National Democratic Congress
1996	Samuel Oppong	National Democratic Congress
2000	Samuel Kweku Obodai	New Patriotic Party
2020	Cynthia Morrison	New Patriotic Party
2024	Ernestina Ofori Dangbey	National Democratic Congress

== Elections ==
Ernestina Ofori Dangbey, the current MP for the Agona West constituency was elected in 2024.

== See also ==
- List of Ghana Parliament constituencies
- Agona District
