= Domeabra-Obom =

Constituency in Ghana

- constituency for the Parliament of Ghana
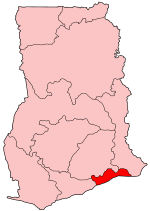
- District: Ga South Municipal
- Region: Greater Accra Region of Ghana

Current constituency
- Created: 2004
- Party: National Democratic Congress
- MP: Isaac Awuku Yibor

Domeabra-Obom is one of the constituencies represented in the Parliament of Ghana. It elects one Member of Parliament (MP) by the first past the post system of election. Isaac Awuku Yibor is the member of parliament for the constituency. Domeabra-Obom is located in the Ga South Municipal of the Greater Accra Region of Ghana.

== Boundaries ==
The seat is located within the Accra Metropolis District of the Greater Accra Region of Ghana. It was formed prior to the 2004 December presidential and parliamentary elections by the division of the old Ga South constituency into the new Domeabra-Obom, Weija and the Trobu-Amasaman constituencies.

== Members of Parliament ==
Election	Member	Party
2004	Daoud Anum Yemoh	National Democratic Congress

== Elections ==
2008 Ghanaian parliamentary election: Domeabra-Obom Source:Ghana Home Page
Party	Candidate	Votes	%	±%
National Democratic Congress	Daoud Anum Yemoh	11,312	73.0	+3.3
New Patriotic Party	Nii Akwei Addo	3,346	21.6	−0.6
Democratic Freedom Party	Joseph Nii Akwei Allotey	544	3.5	N/A
Convention People's Party	Ebenezer Kwesi Ocloo	301	1.9	−3.3
Majority		7,966	51.4	+3.8
Turnout				N/A

2004 Ghanaian parliamentary election:Domeabra-Obom Source:Electoral Commission of Ghana
Party	Candidate	Votes	%	±%
National Democratic Congress	Daoud Anum Yemoh	10,424	69.8	N/A
New Patriotic Party	Nii Akwei Addo	3,313	22.2	N/A
Convention People's Party	Ebenezer Kwesi Ocloo	781	5.2	N/A
Great Consolidated Popular Party	Godwin Senoo	414	2.8	N/A
Majority		7,111	47.6	N/A
Turnout		15,428	83.7	N/A

== See also ==
- List of Ghana Parliament constituencies
