= Kwabre East (Ghana parliament constituency) =

Constituency in the Ashanti Region of Ghana

- constituency for the Parliament of Ghana
- District: Kwabre East District
- Region: Ashanti Region of Ghana

Current constituency
- Party: New Patriotic Party
- MP: Onyina-Acheampong Akwasi Gyamfi

Kwabre East is one of the constituencies represented in the Parliament of Ghana. It elects one member of parliament (MP) by the first past the post system of election. Onyina-Acheampong Akwasi Gyamfi is the member of parliament for the constituency. He was elected on the ticket of the New Patriotic Party (NPP).

== List of members of parliament ==
Election	Member	Party	Ref
1996			
2000			
2004	Kofi Frimpong	New Patriotic Party	
2008	Kofi Frimpong	New Patriotic Party	
2012	Kofi Frimpong	New Patriotic Party	
2016	Francisca Oteng Mensah	New Patriotic Party	
2020	Francisca Oteng Mensah	New Patriotic Party	
2024	Onyina-Acheampong Akwasi Gyamfi	New Patriotic Party	

== See also ==
- List of Ghana Parliament constituencies
