= Shai-Osudoku =

Ghana parliament constituency

- constituency for the Parliament of Ghana
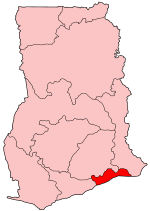
- District: Tema Municipal District
- Region: Greater Accra Region of Ghana

Current constituency
- Party: National Democratic Congress
- MP: Linda Obenewaa Akweley Ocloo

Shai-Osudoku is one of the constituencies represented in the Parliament of Ghana. It elects one Member of Parliament (MP) by the first past the post system of election. Linda Obenewaa Akweley Ocloo is the member of parliament for the constituency. Shai-Osudoku is located in the Tema Municipal District of the Greater Accra Region of Ghana.

== Members of Parliament ==
Election	Member	Party
1992	Michael Afedi Gizo	National Democratic Congress
2004	David Tetteh Assumeng	National Democratic Congress
2016	Linda Obenewaa Akweley Ocloo	National Democratic Congress

== Elections ==
MPs elected in the Ghanaian parliamentary election, 2008:Shai-Osudoku Source: Ghana Home Page
Party	Candidate	Votes	%	±%
National Democratic Congress	David Tetteh Assumeng	14,725	66.4	—
New Patriotic Party	Daniel Christian Dugan	5,565	25.1	—
Convention People's Party	Emmanuel Martey Tetteh	1,876	8.5	—
People's National Convention	Albert Nartey	0.0	0.0	—
Majority		9,160	41.3	—
Turnout		—	—	—

== See also ==
- List of Ghana Parliament constituencies
