= Naana Eyiah Quansah =

Ghanaian politician

Hon. Naana Eyiah MP
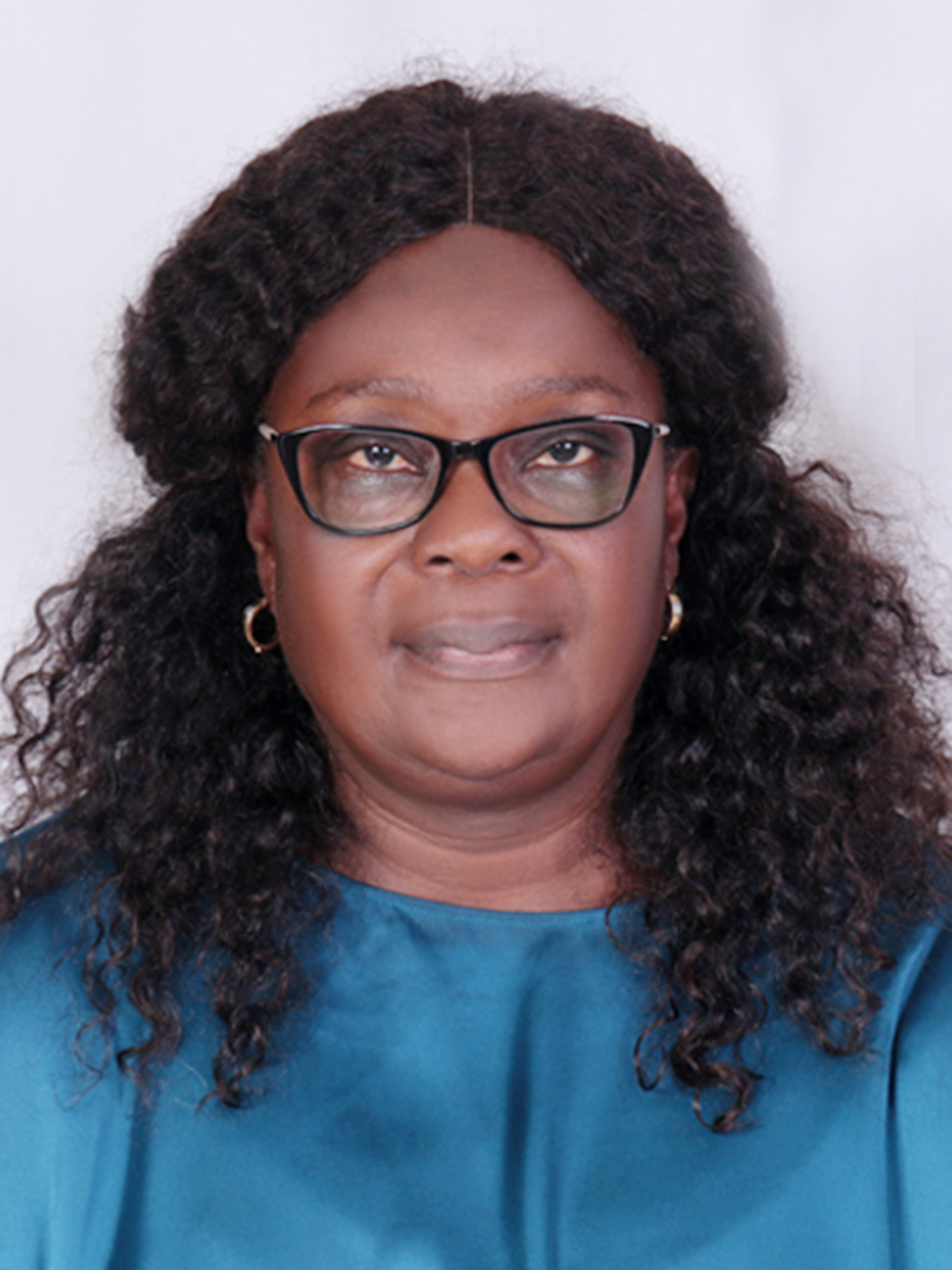

Member of the Ghana Parliament for Gomoa Central Constituency
- Incumbent
- Assumed office 7 January 2016

Deputy Minister for Lands and Natural Resources
- In office February 2017 – January 2021
- President: Nana Akuffo-Addo

Deputy Minister for Interior
- Incumbent
- Assumed office 2021
- President: Nana Akuffo-Addo

Personal details
- Born: 14 February 1963 (age 63) Gomoa Lome, Ghana)
- Party: New Patriotic Party
- Children: 1
- Education: Macquarie Graduate School of Management
- Occupation: Politician
- Profession: Chief Executive Officer
- Committees: Government Assurance Committee; Health Committee

Naana Eyiah is a Ghanaian politician and a member of the New Patriotic Party. She is the former member of parliament for Gomoa Central Constituency in the Central Region of Ghana. She was a Deputy Minister for Interior.

== Early life and education ==
Naana Eyiah was born on 14 February 1963 and hails from Gomoa Lome in the Central Region of Ghana. She had a diploma in Project Management in 2017.

== Career ==
Eyiah was the chief executive officer for Naaba Company Limited.

== Politics ==
Naana Eyiah is a member of the New Patriotic Party. She was the former Deputy Minister for Lands and Natural Resources.

=== 2016 election ===
In the 2016 Ghanaian general elections, she won the Gomoa Central Constituency parliamentary seat with 14,178 votes making 51.6% of the total votes cast whilst the NDC parliamentary candidate Rachel Florence Appoh had 12,858 votes making 46.8% of the total votes cast, the CPP parliamentary candidate Emmanuel Appoh Mensah had 280 votes making 1.0% of the total votes cast and the PPP parliamentary candidate Grace Ignophia Appiah had 174 votes making 0.6% of the total votes cast.

=== 2020 election ===
In the 2020 Ghanaian general elections, she again won the Gomoa Central Constituency parliamentary seat with 20,527 votes making 56.81% of the total votes cast whilst the NDC parliamentary candidate Jonamoah Moses Jehu-Appiah had 14,568 votes making 42.32% of the total votes cast, the GUM parliamentary candidate Hannah Chrissam had 561 votes making 1.6% of the total votes cast and the NDP parliamentary candidate Frank Otchere Painstil had 476 votes making 1.3% of the total votes cast.

=== Committees ===
Quansah is a member of the Government Assurance Committee and also a member of the Health Committee.

== Personal life ==
Naana Eyiah identifies as a Christian who is married with one child.

== Philanthropy ==
In May 2019, she gave clothing materials, food items and drinks to over 300 women in her constituency.

In February 2020, she donated health and office equipment to health facilities in the Gomoa Central Constituency.

In April 2022, she donated some school materials to about 120 graduates in her constituency who had admissions to senior high schools.
