= Jachie-Pramso Secondary School =

Co-ed school in Kumasi, Ashanti, Ghana

Coordinates: 6.5633277°N 1.5163346°W

The Jachie-Pramso Secondary School is a co-ed second cycle school in Jachie-Pramso in the Bosomtwe District of the Ashanti Region of Ghana.

== History ==
The school was established in 1970.

== Notable alumni ==
- Doctor Yaw Osei Adutwum - former education minister and a member of Parliament for Bosomtwe constituency
- Sarfo Ansah - Ghanaian sprinter, athlete at Tokyo 2020 Olympics
- Prof. Ken Attafuah - Ghanaian criminologist and head of National Identification Authority
