= Boakye Agyarko =

Ghanaian politician

Former Minister of Energy, Ghana Boakye Agyarko

Minister of Energy, Ghana
- In office February 2017 – August 2018
- President: Nana Akuffo-Addo
- Preceded by: Emmanuel Armah Kofi Buah
- Succeeded by: John Peter Amewu

Personal details
- Born: Boakye Kyeremateng Agyarko; 1956 (age 69–70) Kumasi Ghana
- Party: New Patriotic Party
- Education: Mfantsipim School, University of Ghana, Pace University
- Occupation: Politician
- Profession: Banker, economist, Politician

Boakye Kyeremateng Agyarko (born 1956) is a Ghanaian economist, politician and a former banker. He was the vice president of the Bank of New York. He is a former Minister of Energy.

== Early life and education ==
Agyarko was born in 1956, at Kumasi in the Ashanti Region to Kwasi Agyarko. His father was a merchant and United Party activist from Jamase in the Ashanti Region and his mother was Jane Ladze Padi from Krobo Odumase in the Eastern Region. He is the brother of Dedo Difie Agyarko-Kusi and Emmanuel Kwabena Kyeremateng Agyarko.

Agyarko attended the K. O. Methodist Primary School in Ashtown and the Kwame Nkrumah University of Science and Technology Primary School in Kumasi. He then proceeded to Mfantsipim School in Cape Coast for his secondary education from where he had both his GCE Ordinary Level and GCE Advanced Level certified. He obtained his Bachelor of Arts degree in Economics and Political Science from the University of Ghana, Legon. He immigrated to the United States of America as a political refugee. Whilst there, he obtained an Advanced Professional Certificate in Banking from the American Institute of Banking and a Master of Business Administration in Financial Economics from Pace University, New York.

== Working life ==
After graduating from the University of Ghana in 1980, Agyarko did his mandatory national service at the Ghana Union Nation of Students as the National Coordinator. When the national service ended in 1981, he was employed as a junior economist with Management and Investment Consultants in Accra. He worked there till 1984 where he was forced to flee Ghana due to an attempt on his life.

=== Wrongful arrest ===
After a failed coup d'état led by Lance Corporal Halidu Giwa and Sergeant Abdul Malik, the military high command assumed that he was part of coup plotters. This was due to his high political activism and criticism of the economic policies adopted by the country's military leaders led by Jerry John Rawlings. He was arrested by men from the Ghana Armed Forces who took him to the Air Force Base at Burma Camp in Accra. He was shot at the base and sent to the 37 Military Hospital morgue. At the morgue, a nurse realised that he was not dead and rushed him to the emergency services where he was operated upon by Henry Koku Akpalu. After the surgery he fled the country through the help of his two sisters and a French citizen, Monsieur Le Veloire. Agyarko emigrated to the United States as a political refugee and enrolled at Pace University.

=== Bank of New York ===
After graduating from Pace University, he was employed by the Bank of New York, the oldest bank in the United States. He spent over twenty years at the bank and worked at senior levels in various departments of the Bank. The positions he held included operations management and analysis, product development, global network managements, international banking and asset management and the Year 2000 (Y2K) Management Group. He had oversight responsibilities of various sectors and departments notably in trade, finance, loan syndications, asset securitization and structured finance. He was the principal negotiator on the setting up of the Bank of New York in Mexico. While working in New York he became a member of the American Economic Association and an Associate Member of the American Institute of Bankers. He rose through the ranks of the bank and became vice president and Head of Global Network Management for the Americas in the Investment Management and Services Division. He left the bank after 22 years so he could contest elections in Ghana. While in the US he wrote a weekly column in The Statesman Newspaper titled Letter from America from 1993 through 1998.

== Political life ==
Agyarko entered politics at an early age and was the National Coordinator for the Ghana Union of Students and Youth Associations from 1979 to 1980. He was a founding member of the New Patriotic Party in 1992. Within the party he has held several positions including chairman of The Danquah Busia Club of North America, and briefly served as a Trustee of the Busia Foundation. He was elected the coordinator for the New Patriotic Party in North America. Agyarko was appointed as National Campaign manager of the New Patriotic Party in the 2012 Presidential election. He was appointed the Policy Adviser to the Presidential Candidate of the New Patriotic Party during the 2016 election.

=== Ministerial appointment ===
In January 2017, Agyarko was appointed the minister of energy in the Akufo-Addo administration. He was approved by parliament in February 2017. As the Energy Minister, Agyarko had supervisory responsibility for fifteen major agencies under the ministry.

==== Controversy ====
Prior to Agyarko's ministerial confirmation in February 2017, he was accused by Mahama Ayariga at the parliamentary appointment committee of bribing members of the minority to facilitate his approval as a Minister of energy. Ayariga reported on Radio Gold, that Agyarko through Muntaka Mubarak, the minority Chief Whip, had tried to influence the decision of the Appointments Committee of Parliament by giving each minority member a bribe. The Speaker of Parliament, Aaron Mike Oquaye set up an ad hoc parliamentary committee to investigate the matter. After the investigation, the Joe Ghartey committee exonerated Agyarko but cited and found Ayariga guilty of being in contempt of parliament for making false allegations against a colleague and bringing the parliament into disrepute. Ayariga was made to render an apology on the floor of parliament and warned to be mindful of his actions in the future. After his ministerial appointment was approved, Ayariga publicly praised Agyarko for his track record asserting that his nomination was approved on merit.

=== Cabinet minister ===
In May 2017, President Nana Akufo-Addo named Boakye Agyarko as part of nineteen ministers who would form his cabinet. The names of the 19 ministers were submitted to the Parliament of Ghana and announced by the Speaker of the House, Rt. Hon. Prof. Mike Ocquaye. As a Cabinet minister, Agyarko was part of the inner circle of the president and aided in key decision-making activities in the country.

Political offices
Preceded by Emmanuel Armah Kofi Buah	Minister for Energy and Petroleum; 2017–present	Incumbent
Parliament of Ghana
Preceded by Frema Opare	Member of Parliament for Ayawaso West; 2009–present	Incumbent
