= Kofi Amankwa-Manu =

Ghanaian politician (born 1969)

Hon. Kofi Amankwa-Manu
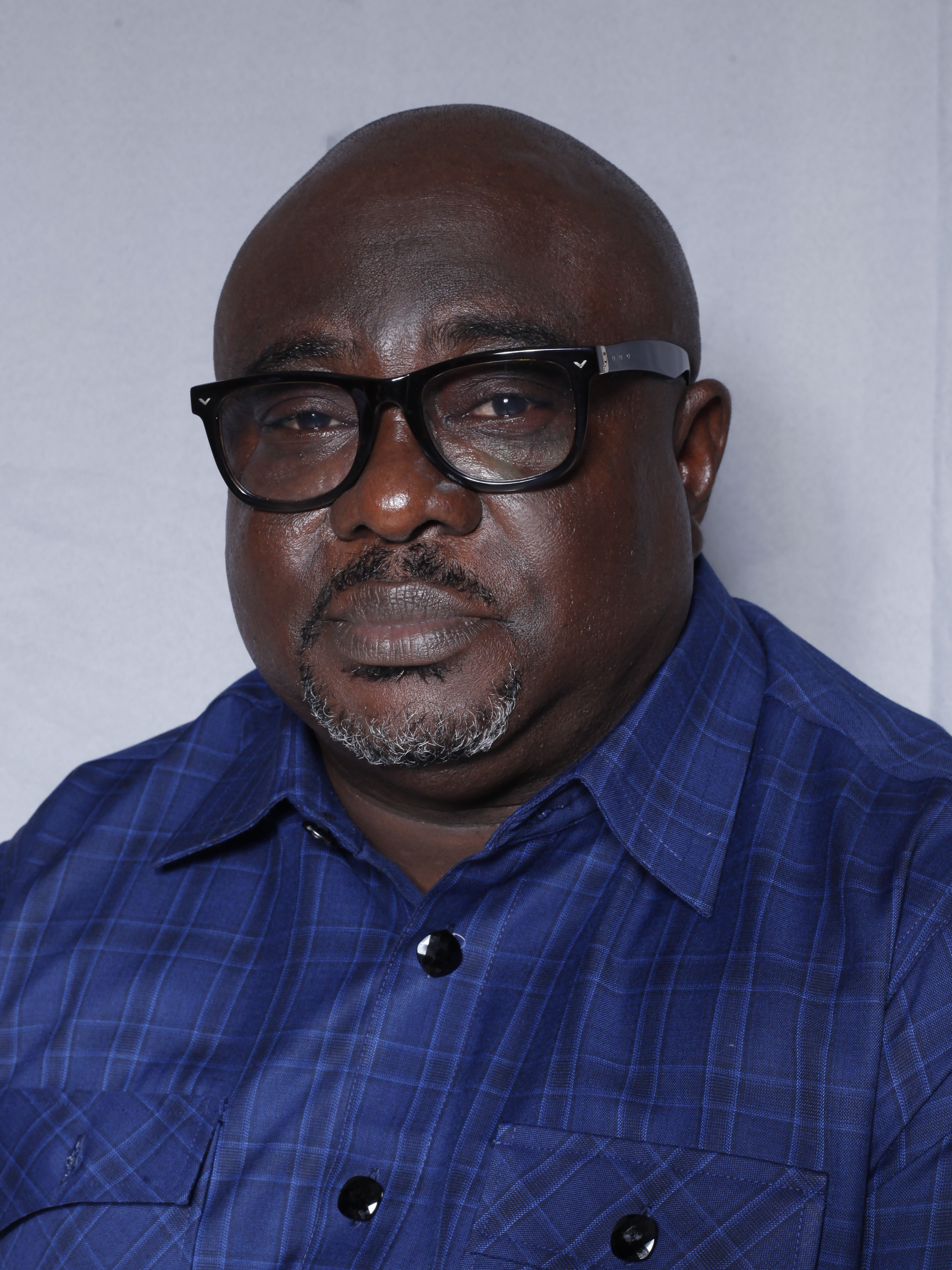

Member of Parliament for Atwima-Kwanwoma Constituency
- Incumbent
- Assumed office 7 January 2021

Personal details
- Born: 11 April 1968 (age 58) Atwima Foase, Ghana
- Party: New Patriotic Party
- Occupation: Politician
- Profession: Research Assistant
- Committees: Gender and Children Committee; Food, Agriculture and Cocoa Affairs Committee

Kofi Amankwa-Manu (born 11 April 1969) is a Ghanaian politician who is a member of the New Patriotic Party (NPP). He is the member of parliament for the Atwima-Kwanwoma Constituency in the Ashanti Region of Ghana.

== Early life and education ==
Amankwa-Manu was born on 11 April 1969 and hails from Atwima Foase in the Ashanti region of Ghana. He gained his Ordinary-level qualifications in 1989 and his Advanced levels in 1991. He further had his BSci in Banking and Finance in 2012 and his LLB in 2015.

== Career ==
Amankwa-Manu served in the office of the president as the Head of Impact Assessment Unit during the first term of President Nana Akufo-Addo. He was the research assistant Fonaa Institute. He was also the CEO of the Waltons Limited.

== Politics ==
Ahead of the 2020 Ghanaian general election, Amankwa-Manu entered the race for the parliamentary candidate in the NPP primaries in the Atwima-Kwanwoma Constituency. In June 2020, he won the primaries for the Atwima-Kwanwoma constituency after defeating incumbent member of parliament (MP) Kojo Appiah-Kubi, who had served as MP for three terms and had been in parliament since January 2009. He won by securing 415 votes, while the incumbent had 69 votes.

Amankwa-Manu was elected member of parliament for Atwima-Kwanwoma in the 2020 December parliamentary elections. He was declared winner in the parliamentary elections after obtaining 78,209 votes representing 83.78% against his closest contender the National Democratic Congress' candidate Grace Agyemang Asamoah of who had 14,730 votes representing 15.78%.

=== Committees ===
Amankwa-Manu is a member of the Gender and Children Committee and also the Food, Agriculture and Cocoa Affairs Committee.

== Personal life ==
Amankwa-Manu is a Christian.
