= Sampson Adu-Gyamfi =

Ghanaian politician

Sampson Adu Gyamfi

Member of Parliament for Atwima-Kwanwoma
- In office 7 January 1993 – 6 January 1997
- President: Jerry John Rawlings
- Preceded by: New
- Succeeded by: Kojo Appiah-Kubi

Personal details
- Born: 7 May 1950 (age 76) Kokobeng, Ashanti Region, (Gold Coast now Ghana)
- Party: National Democratic Congress
- Education: Osei Tutu Senior High School; Management Development And Productivity Institute
- Occupation: Politician
- Profession: Teacher

Sampson Adu Gyamfi (born 7 May 1950) is a Ghanaian politician and a member of the first Parliament of the fourth Republic Representing the Atwima-Kwanwoma constituency in the Ashanti Region of Ghana.

== Early life and education ==
Adu-Gyamfi was born on 7 May 1950 at Kokobeng, a town in the Ashanti Region of Ghana. He attended the Osei Tutu Training College where he obtained his Teachers' Training Certificate, and the Management Development And Productivity Institute (MDPI) where he studied various courses including Transport and Communication.

== Politics ==
Adu-Gyamfi was elected into parliament on the ticket of the National Democratic Congress during the December 1992 Ghanaian parliamentary election to represent the Atwima-Kwanwoma Constituency in the Ashanti Region of Ghana. He lost his seat to Matthew Kwaku Antwi of the opposition New Patriotic Party after he was defeated in his party's parliamentary primaries by Simon Atta.

== Career ==
Adu-Gyamfi is a teacher by profession and a former member of Parliament for the Atwima-Kwanwoma Constituency in the Ashanti Region of Ghana.

== Religion ==
He is a Christian.
