= Lamashegu shooting =

Shooting in Lamashegu in Ghana

Lamashegu Shooting
- Location: Lamashegu
- Date: February 13, 2022
- Attack type: Mass shooting
- Deaths: 1
- Injuries: 8
- Perpetrator: Security personnel

On 13 February 2022 at about 1pm(UTC), the Ghana Police clashed with some youth in Lamashegu in the Tamale South Municipality in the Northern region of Ghana.

== Incident ==
It started when the police patrols allegedly stopped an unregistered vehicle but the driver did not stop and was chased by the police. The young man entered into the Lamashe-Naa's Palace to avoid being caught by the security personnel. The young man about 24 years old was shot by the police. It resulted in the torching of woods and car tires on major roads in Tamale. The youth in the community threw stones at the Police and the Police responded with firing gunshots. Water cannon and shots fired were used to disperse the youth.

== Victims ==
One person identified as Abdul Hakim Yakubu died after he was hit by a stray bullet shot by the police. Eight persons got injured during the incident.

== Perpetrators ==
The Police interdicted six personnel for their involvement in the clash. They were Constable Doris Serwa Bonsu, General Constable Harrison Twum Danso, General Corporal Samson Kweku Darfour, General Corporal Prosper Mormesimu, General Constable Mathew Sah and General Constable Nuhu Muntari.

== Aftermath ==
Some youth in Lamashegu allegedly torched an apartment belonging to a fire service personnel who was mistaken to be a police officer. The boy who died after being shot was buried. The Tamale Circuit Court remanded the police officer who shot the unregistered vehicle by the name General Corporal Samson Kweku Darfour into police custody. He was charged for causing harm and unlawful discharge of weapon. Another police personnel called Corporal Monney Koranteng, allegedly made some statements against the Lamashegu Chief and the people on social media. He was charged for offensive conduct to the breach of peace.

== Condemnation ==
Naa Ziblim Abdulai who was the Chief of Lamashegu condemned the incident claiming the police officer who shot the young man must be made to face the law.

Haruna Iddrisu also condemned the use of live ammunition. He said: "The recurrent acts of attack on the inhabitants of Tamale, through the use of live ammunition by the Police to quell disturbances that result in loss of lives and injury to innocent bystanders, is unacceptable and is to be denounced."

== See also ==
- Ayawaso West-Wuogon violence
- Ejura Shooting, Ghana
- Nkoranza shooting
