= Bosomtwe-Atwima-Kwanwoma District =

- District
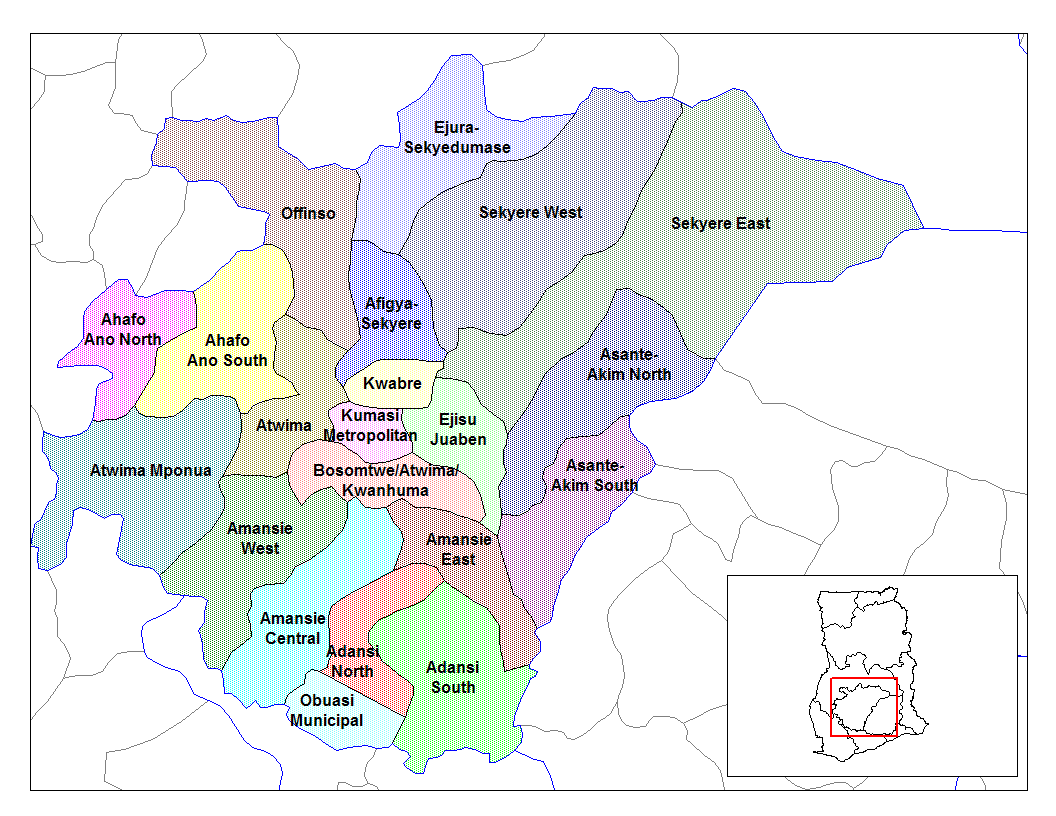
- Districts of Ashanti Region

- Location of Bosomtwe-Atwima-Kwanwoma District within Ashanti
- Coordinates: 6°32′N 1°29′W
- Country: Ghana
- Region: Ashanti
- Capital: Kuntanase

Area
  - Total: 718 km^{2} (277 sq mi)

Population (2012)
  - Total: —
- Time zone: UTC+0 (GMT)

Bosomtwe-Atwima-Kwanwoma District is a former district that was located in Ashanti Region, Ghana. Originally created as an ordinary district assembly in 1988, which was created from the former Ejisu-Juaben-Bosomtwe District Council. However on 29 February 2008, it was split off into two new districts: Botsomtwe District (capital: Kuntanase) and Atwima-Kwanwoma District (capital: Foase, later Twedie). The district assembly was located in the central part of Ashanti Region and had Kuntanase as its capital town.

== Sources ==
- "Districts of Ghana". Statoids.
- GhanaDistricts.com
