= Josephine Afua Addae-Mensah =

Ghanaian politician

Josephine Addae-Mensah Afua

MP for Bosomtwe
- In office 7 January 1993 – 6 January 1997
- President: Jerry John Rawlings
- Preceded by: New
- Succeeded by: Poku Adu-Gyamfi

Personal details
- Born: 1947 (age 78–79) Apinkra, Ashanti Region, Ghana
- Party: Every Ghanaian Living Everywhere
- Education: Akrokerri College of Education
- Occupation: Politician
- Profession: Teacher

Josephine Addae-Mensah Afua (born 1947) is a Ghanaian politician and a member of the first Parliament of the fourth Republic representing the Bosomtwe constituency in the Ashanti region. She represents the Every Ghanaian Living Everywhere political party.

== Early life and education ==
Afua Mensah was born in 1947 at Apinkra in the Ashanti Region of Ghana. She attended the Akorokerri Teacher Training College and obtained her Teacher's Training Certificate.

== Politics ==
Afua Mensah was first elected into Parliament on the ticket of the Every Ghanaian Living Everywhere Political Party during the 1992 Ghanaian parliamentary election for the Bosomtwe Constituency. she served for one term as a parliamentarian for the Bosomtwe constituency. She was succeeded by Adu Gyamfi Poku of the New Patriotic Party during the 1996 Ghanaian general elections.

== Career ==
Afua Mensah is a teacher by profession and a former member of parliament for the Bosomtwe Constituency in the Ashanti Region of Ghana.

== Personal life ==
Afua Mensah is a Christian.
