= Ghana Card =

National identity card of Ghana

ECOWAS IDENTITY CARD
- Ghana Card (with chip)
- Type: Identity card, optional replacement for passport for national travel
- Issued by: Ghana
- First issued: 1993
- Purpose: Proof of identity
- Valid in: Ghana
- Eligibility: Ghanaian citizenship
- Expiration: 10 years

The Ghana Card is the national Identity card that is issued by the Ghanaian authorities to Ghanaian citizens – both resident and non-resident, legal and permanent residents of foreign nationals. It is proof of identity, citizenship and residence of the holder. The current version is in ID1 format and biometric. It is issued by the National Identification Authority of Ghana and Regarded as a property of the country as such. In July 2023, through the initiative of the Vice President of Ghana, Dr. Mahamudu Bawumia, new card numbers were issued to newborn babies as part of pilot program to incorporate newborn babies unto the database.

== History ==
In 1973, national identity cards were issued to citizens in the border regions of Ghana including Volta, Northern, Upper East and Upper West, Brong Ahafo, and parts of the Western Region.

The project was discontinued three years later due to problems with logistics and lack of financial support. This was the first time the idea of national identification systems arose. Again, in 1987, the Government of the Provisional National Defence Council (PNDC) through the National Commission for Democracy (NCD), revisited the national identity card concept by establishing committees including a Technical Implementation Committee. Due to economic difficulties, the issue was not pursued. Once again, in 2001, when the National Economic Dialogue was convened, the National Identification System (NIS) was seen as a major policy concern. As a result, a multisectoral Technical Committee consisting of stakeholder organisations was established to do the following:

- Study and review the 1991 National Identification report;
- Establish the main principles and the conceptual procedures for an integrated national identification system for Ghana;
- Identify and recommend specific technologies for such a system; and
- Develop a plan of action and a time frame for the implementation of the system.

The Technical Committee completed its assignment in 2002 and submitted a report to the Cabinet. The report was accepted, but it had to form a basis for the government and state to:

- Cover all citizens including legally resident non Ghanaians;
- Help with crime prevention, healthcare, welfare services, disaster management;
- Assist in the delivery of public services to targeted populations, banking services;
- Create a credible voters register, social security;
- Check the application and acquisition of passports and drivers’ licences; and
- Aid with increased revenue collection.

By 2003, the National Identification Secretariat was set up to implement and manage the National Identification System (NIS). The Act establishing the National Identification Authority was passed in 2006, with Prof. Ernest Dumor appointed as the Executive Secretary. Under his tenure, the NIA was able to acquire a host of logistical items required for institutional building of the NIA. The authority was able to acquire 1,510 Mobile Registration Workstations for the mass registration exercise that came with chargers and batteries from the NIA's technical partner SAGEM from France.

Pick-up trucks, vans and civilian buses were procured for the mass registration exercise. Drivers were recruited, interviewed and selected. Materials like cartridges, registration forms and writing materials were acquired. Individuals were recruited, trained and selected as Mobile Registration Workstation Operators.

The National Identification Authority's Head Office was built and 97% of the building completed. A pilot mass registration exercise was held to test the forms and equipment deployed for the exercise as well as the registration process as outlined by the Authority. This pilot registration exercise took place in two communities — Abokobi and Sege — in the Greater Accra Region, for 10 days from July 27 to August 4, 2007. The testing selection and training of staff for the Central and Western regions were executed successfully, with mass registration taking off in the Central Region on July 1, 2008. By the end of July 2008, Prof. Kenneth Attafuah was appointed as the Executive Secretary and oversaw the execution of mass registration in the Western, Eastern and Volta Regions between August 2008 and July 2009.

On July 22, 2009, Dr. William Ahadzie began his appointment as the Executive Secretary of the National Identification Authority (NIA).

In 2019, the Automated Fingerprint Identification System (AFIS), the core platform technology for the NIS, which enables accurate and prompt fingerprint matching with real-time accessibility was launched by Authority and registration begun nationwide.

== National Identification Authority ==
The National Identification Authority (NIA) was set up in 2003 under the Office of the President with the mandate to issue national ID cards and manage the National Identification System (NIS). This resulted in the passing of the NIA Act, 2006 (Act 707) to give it the necessary legal premises on which to operate. The National Identity Register Act, 2008 (Act 750) was also passed to give authorisation for collection of personal and biometric data and to ensure the protection of privacy and personal information of enrollees.

The full mandate of the NIA included the establishment of a national data center so as to manage a national database, as well as to set up a system to collect, process, store, retrieve and disseminate personal data on the population (Ghanaian citizens – both resident and non-resident, and legally and permanently resident foreign nationals), ensure the accuracy, integrity and security of such data, and to issue and promote the use of national identity cards in Ghana.

The Automated Fingerprint Identification System (AFIS), the core platform technology for the NIS, enables accurate and prompt fingerprint matching with real-time accessibility when completed. The AFIS claims fingerprint identification accuracy of at least 99.9% and exceptional performance in terms of system processing speed.

The NIA facilitates the integration of all public sector/ civil operation, law enforcement, corporate and business applications/systems to the NIS, and the provision of general identification services. The process of issuing current generation of identity cards started on July 4, 2011. The setting up of the NIS is in response to providing up-to-date data that will facilitate the nation's development agenda.

== Card uses ==
The Ghana Card, which uniquely identifies the individual based on biometric features, can be used by the individual for the verification and authentication of identity in the following situations:

1. Health Delivery: The personal identification number (PIN) and biometrics/personal information is cross-checked with the existing data in the National Identification System during a Ghana Card holder's National Health Insurance Scheme (NHIS) registration.
2. Passport Acquisition: Any time a Ghana Card holder applies for a passport, their personal identification number (PIN) is captured on the passport and their personal information cross-checked with the data in the National Identification System. Ghanaian may not be able to acquire a passport if they do not possess the Ghana Card. This is because only people who qualify to hold Ghanaian passports will be issued with one since the individual's nationality can be properly checked from the National Identification System.
3. Acquisition of Driver's License: The personal identification number (PIN) is one of the required items of information the Driver and Vehicle Licensing Authority (DVLA) demands as soon as the Ghana Card is issued to applicants. The PIN is captured on a Ghana Card holder's driver's license and vehicle registration documents. The personal information is also verified from the NIA to determine a person's true identity for license acquisition and establish the true identities of vehicle owners. A time will come when a person may not be able to make a new registration or renewal at the DVLA without their Ghana Card.
4. Shipping and Clearing of Goods from the Port: All goods a Ghana Card holder exports out of Ghana or imports into Ghana are directly linked to their personal identification number (PIN) to eliminate fraud and theft in the shipping and clearing of goods at the ports and harbours of Ghana.
5. Receipt of Banking Services: A Ghana Card holder can use the card as an identity verification document when opening a bank account, withdrawing money from a bank, or receiving money transfers in Ghana. It is easier for a Ghana Card holder to take a loan from the bank whether they work in an identifiable institution or not. This is because their identity can be easily verified and the banks are confident that they can be traced in the event of loan default based on their PIN or biometric information stored on the Ghana Card.
6. Credit Information: The use of the Ghana Card can enable the banks in Ghana to easily establish a person's credit-worthiness from the Credit Referencing Agencies any time they apply for a loan. This may lead to a significant reduction in bank rates on loans since the banks can establish whether they are already servicing a loan from another bank, which in turn could result in a reduction in the incidence of bad debts.
7. Registration of Business: Business registration is linked to a Ghana Card holder's PIN to help identify them as the true owner of their business. The Registrar General's Department makes it a requirement for all business owners to provide their PIN on the Ghana Card during business registration. This eliminates business registration fraud through the exposure of false identities and prevents multiple registrations of businesses for fraudulent purposes.
8. Education: The PIN of a Ghana Card holder's child is captured during enrollment into primary school and the number is used for admission into every school level until the child completes tertiary education. This helps in tracking the progress of a Ghana Card holder's child in the educational sector for necessary policy interventions. It prevents a persons Ghana Card from by a replaced, and unqualified ones by some school authorities during admission. Students who qualify for student loans are able to use the Ghana Card to establish their identities to eliminate fraud. Data from the NIA database enables the Ministry of Education to plan effectively for the provision of targeted educational infrastructure and other resources for their community.
9. Job Search: The Ghana Card is used to establish a persons identity during job search. This boostes their chances of getting the job as employers will be sure they are dealing with the rightful owner of the certificates a person provides in support of their qualifications.
10. Disaster Management: Identification of true victims of disasters is often problematic because there are infiltrators who take advantage of the absence of credible identification system to benefit at the expense of the affected ones. Data on a persons Ghana Card is used to establish whether they live in an area affected by a disaster to enable them to receive relief items.
11. Access to Social Services: The Ghana Card authenticates a persons entitlement to government services. Services such as LEAP payments and free National Health Insurance Scheme (NHIS) registration for persons below 18 years or above 70 years is made dependent on the presentation of the Ghana Card.
12. Protecting the Rights of Children: Child trafficking especially for forced labour is on the increase in Ghana and children get lost daily. It has been very difficult to establish the identities of children rescued from human traffickers or those found in the streets to re-unite them with their legal ascendant(s). Since a Ghana Card holder's child's fingerprints and legal ascendant(s) information are stored in the national database, it is easier to return a Ghana Card holder's lost child to them when their live fingerprints are taken and matched into the NIS.
13. Electoral Registration: During voter registration, a Ghana Card holder's PIN is captured for the authentication of their citizenship, name, age and residence to determine whether they qualify to vote or not.
14. Travelling: The Ghana Card is used to validate a persons identity at airports, borders, police check posts and while booking tickets. The emerging Ghana railway travel may require a person to carry their Ghana Card especially if e-tickets are introduced.
15. E-Commerce & Payment Industry: The Ghana Card is used in a multiplicity of situations – to register for offline services such as a loan or an insurance plan, while buying a car. There have been past issues raised about Know Your Customer norms for Cash Cards like E-zwich and ATM Cards. The Ghana Card is likely to be made mandatory for the validation of all payments. Ghanaian companies currently offering m-commerce transactions such as Tigo Cash and the Airtel Zap service used for sending and receiving money, topping up airtime, transferring credit to others, paying utility bills as well as goods and services using the mobile phone opt for the Ghana Card as a verification document.
16. Pension Claims: As identity theft occurs when someone uses a persons personal information, such as Social Security number without their permission to commit fraud by claiming their benefits or that of a relation. The Ghana Card identifies a Ghana Card holder as the rightful and only person authorized to receive their pension benefits. In the event of the Ghana Card holder's death, only their children or spouse named on their Ghana Card will benefit from their pension claim.
17. SIM Card Registration: With previous generations of ID Cards one of the key issues with the directive by the National Communications Authority for registration of all SIM cards for getting a mobile connection has been the verification of the individual getting the connection. Particularly in urban areas, and with a migrant population in Ghana, authentication of individuals has been an issue; as a few people did not possess any ID at all. So the Ghana Card has become the acceptable verification document for mobile connection. In order to make it easier for consumers to check and know the number of SIM Cards registered with their Ghana Card, the National Communication Authority (NCA) on the 1st May, 2023 introduced a short code *402*1# of which if dialled, would display the number of SIMs registered.
18. Hire Purchase: The Ghana Card is used in establishing a persons identity when making hire purchase arrangements as it contains their digital picture and biometric information that conclusively establishes their identity in addition to their personal and residential information.
19. Insurance Claims: As a person needs to prove their identity in the event of any disaster for which they have to make insurance claims. The Ghana Card provides them with the necessary information they need to conclusively establish their identity.
20. Remittances from Abroad: Identity theft happens in many ways: a thief obtains credit card receipts or bank statements from your wallet or trash; personal information is inadvertently provided over the phone or Internet; or other confidential information. Before a person even realizes their personal information has been compromised, their credit and goods is claimed by fraudulent persons. The use of the Ghana Card and PIN in claiming goods and monies sent from abroad has been designed to prevent unauthorized persons from claiming what is due to the Ghana Card holder.

== Appearance ==
The Ghana Card (ID Card) is plastic and has the size of a credit card. The front contains the bearer's face the following fields written in English:

=== Front ===
Ghana Card (Ghanaian electronic ID Card) 2011 – (front)

1. Guilloches that form a continuous fine pattern.
2. Embedded ghost portrait of the cardholder which, if scratched on consistently, leaves a hold in the card.
3. "REPUBLIC OF GHANA"
4. Map of Ghana which changes colour depending on the tilt of the card.
5. Double Rainbow that changes colour to yellow/green depending on tilt of the card.
6. Ghana map with a star in the middle and a layer of stars attached to the left directly on ghost portrait depending on tilt of the card.
7. Ghana map with a star in the middle super-imposed on the coat of arms depending on the tilt of the card.
8. "REPUBLIC OF GHANA"
9. "FREEDOM AND JUSTICE"
10. Ghana's coat of arms super-imposed on main portrait.

NB: The ID card issued to citizens and non-citizens are the same apart from the national code in the Personal ID number (one reason that should make the Ghana Card usable by the EC). Visible inscriptions on front of the card:

i. “REPUBLIC OF GHANA”	vi. Sex
ii. “National Identity Card”	vii. Date of Birth
iii. Surname	viii. Height
Iv. First name	ix. Randomly generated Personal ID Number (PIN)
v. Middle Name(s)	x. Date of Expiry (normally 10 years after the date of issue)

Visible Images
- a. Ghana's national flag to the left top corner
- b. Ghana’s coat of arms to the right top corner
- c. Ghost portrait of cardholder
- d. Main portrait of image of cardholder
- e. Map of Ghana

=== Back ===
Ghana Card (Ghanaian electronic ID Card) 2011 – (back)

Visible Inscriptions/features

- a. THIS CARD IS THE PROPERTY OF THE GOVERNMENT OF THE REPUBLIC OF GHANA. IF FOUND PLEASE CONTACT THE NEAREST NIA OFFICE OR POLICE STATION
- b. Holder’s signature
- c. Serial Number
- d. Flying eagle to the right of the card.
- e. Holder’s biometric and personal information stored in a 2-D barcode which can only be read with a card reader.

NB: The Ghana Card contains second and third level security features by the NIA (National Identification Authority):

On the photo a micro-holographic reflecting stamp is placed. The back contains the machine readable zone. The microchip, inside the card contains biometric data such as fingerprints of the holder, the image, signature, etc. The data can be extracted from the chip with wireless RFID technology. The ID card serves as a travel document for national travel. The validity of the card is 10 years and is compulsory for citizens over 16.

== Issuing procedure ==
The identity card is requested at the districts (and is issued for free to all Ghanaians) where a digital picture of the bearer's face and fingerprints are taken. The card should be picked up in person after 15 days, where the bearer identifies himself/herself with his/her fingerprints.

The National Identification Authority has started an online process to issue Ghana Cards to individuals. This involves submitting the printed document at the NIA office. Barely 24 hours after the online registration took off, the NIA Shut down the registration site because their servers could not handle the number of requests coming in.

== Replacing Lost Cards ==
When the identity card is lost, replacement procedures are as follows:

- You first need to go to a police station and fill a form. You'll then be given a document to submit to the National Identification Authority(NIA) for the replacement, where you'll be asked to fill a form for card replacement.
- Ghanaians and Non-Ghanaians replacing lost cards are required to pay an amount of GH¢30.15 and $60 respectively, through mobile money or bank payment.

You will be given a document to submit to the National Identification Authority (NIA) for the replacement. At the NIA office, you will have to take a form for card replacement. For Ghanaians, you Pay a current amount of GHC 30.15 via mobile money. Non-Ghanaians Replacing loss Non-Ghanaian Identity Card, You pay U$60 or its equivalent. The payment will be verified by the officers.

== Contact Address of the National Identification Authority-Ghana Card ==
Address:

No.8 Nelson Mandela Avenue

Off Gulf House Street

South Legon, Accra, Ghana.

Digital Address: GA-237-1033

P.O. Box M680

Ministries Post Office

Accra, Ghana.

Contacts:

(+233) 302-99-9306-9

(+233) 73-8333

(+233) 242-43-8615

Email: info@nia.gov.gh

== See also ==
- Ghanaian passport
