= Matthew Kwaku Antwi =

Ghanaian politician (born 1941)

Hon. Matthew Kwaku Antwi

Member of the Ghana Parliament for Atwima-Kwanwoma
- In office 7 January 1997 – 6 January 2009
- Preceded by: Sampson Adu Gyamfi
- Succeeded by: Kojo Appiah-Kubi

Personal details
- Born: 4 October 1941 (age 85)
- Party: New Patriotic Party
- Occupation: Research Scientist

Matthew Kwaku Antwi (born 1941) is a Ghanaian politician of the Republic of Ghana. He was the Member of Parliament representing Atwima-Kwanwoma constituency of the Ashanti Region of Ghana in the 4th Parliament of the 4th Republic of Ghana. He is a member of the New Patriotic Party.

== Early life and education ==
Antwi was born on October 4, 1941. He holds a Bachelor of Science degree in Agricultural Science and a Phd.

== Career ==
Antwi is a research scientist.

== Political career ==
Antwi is a member of the New Patriotic Party. He began his career in 1997 after emerging the winner of the 1996 Ghanaian General Elections. He was the reelected on 7 January 2005 after emerging winner in the 2004 Ghanaian General Election in December that year. He was elected as the member of parliament for the Atwima-Kwanwoma constituency in the fourth parliament of the fourth Republic of Ghana.

== Elections ==
Antwi was first elected into Parliament on the Ticket of the New Patriotic Party during the December 1996 Ghanaian General Elections as a member of Parliament for the Atwima-Kwanwoma Constituency. He polled 18,056 votes out of the 23,150 votes representing 58.80% against Simon Atta an NDC member who polled 4,831 votes and Kwasi Amankwa Manu a CPP member who polled 293 votes.

In the year 2000, Antwi won the general elections as the member of parliament for the Atwima-Kwanwoma constituency of the Ashanti Region of Ghana. He won on the ticket of the New Patriotic Party. His constituency was a part of the 31 parliamentary seats out of 33 seats won by the New Patriotic Party in that election for the Ashanti Region. The New Patriotic Party won a majority total of 99 parliamentary seats out of 200 seats. He was elected with 19,656 votes out of 23,199 total valid votes cast. This was equivalent to 85% of the total valid votes cast. He was elected over Awere A. Dankyi of the National Democratic Congress and David O. Darko of the Convention People's Party. These won 2,670 and 799 votes out of the total valid votes cast respectively. These were equivalent to 11.5% and 3.5% respectively of total valid votes cast.

Antwi was elected as the member of parliament for the Atwima-Kwanwoma constituency of the Ashanti Region of Ghana for the first time in the 2004 Ghanaian general elections. He won on the ticket of the New Patriotic Party. His constituency was a part of the 36 parliamentary seats out of 39 seats won by the New Patriotic Party in that election for the Ashanti Region. The New Patriotic Party won a majority total of 128 parliamentary seats out of 230 seats. He was elected with 28,384 votes out of 35,050 total valid votes cast.4 This was equivalent to 81% of total valid votes cast. He was elected over Tony Agyemang Nyame of the National Democratic Congress, Aduhene Opoku Isaac of the Convention People's Party, Michael Yaw Owusu and Gyawu Charles Nantwi both independent candidates. These obtained 4,044, 610, 1,412 and 600 votes respectively of total votes cast. These were equivalent to 11.5%, 1.7%, 4.0% and 1.7% respectively of total valid votes cast.

== Personal life ==
Antwi is a Christian.

== See also ==
- List of MPs elected in the 2004 Ghanaian parliamentary election
