= St. Peter's Boys Senior High School =

Public Senior High school in Ghana

St. Peter's Senior Boys' Secondary School
- School crest
- Nkwatia Kwahu, Eastern Region; Ghana

Information
- Type: Public secondary/high school
- Motto: Dignitati Hominum (For the Dignity of Mankind)
- Religious affiliation: Roman Catholic
- Established: 1957 (69 years ago)
- School district: kwahu east
- Head of school: Rev. Fr. Samuel Ezah Bulu
- Grades: Forms [1-3]
- Enrollment: 1,200+
- Colors: Yellow and green
- Athletics: Track and field
- Mascot: Crocodile
- Nickname: Persco
- Affiliation: Divine Word Missionaries
- Patron Saint: Peter Claver
- First headmaster: Fr. Clement Hotze
- School anthem: "Youth of St. Peter's"

St. Peter's Senior High School, or PERSCO, is a Roman Catholic boys' senior high school in the Eastern Region of Ghana. The school was established in 1957 by the Divine Word Missionaries (SVD). The school is in the town of Nkwatia Kwahu on the Kwahu Ridge.

== Dormitories ==
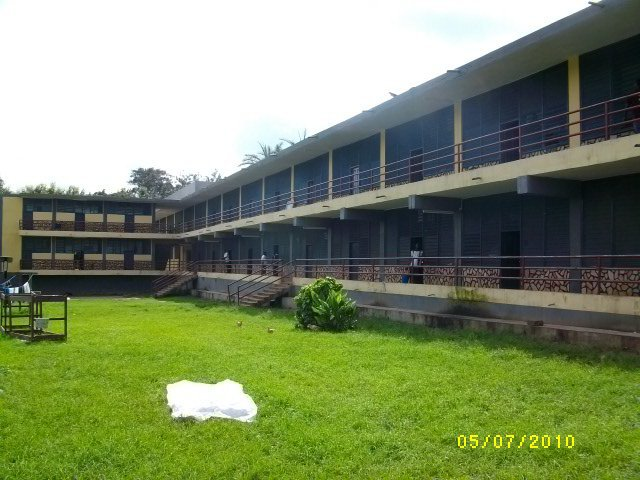
Old dormitory

The school has five dormitory blocks housing six houses named after Roman Catholic saints who were associated with Africa or Black people , and they are as follows:

- St. Peter Claver House
- St. Martin De Porres House
- St. Eugene De Foucauld House
- St. Kizito House
- St. Augustine House
- St. Charles Luanga House

== Academics ==
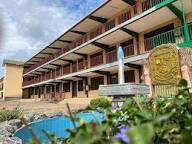
The Senior block of St. Peter's Senior High School

The school offers four programs of study - Visual Arts, General Arts, General Science , and Business. Until the introduction of the computerized placement system by the government for the placement of junior high graduates into secondary schools, the school conducted placement examinations for its first years.

The placement test was to make sure only the best students were selected for the science programs.

== Notable alumni ==
- Ken Attafuah - Ghanaian criminologist and head of the National Identification Authority
- Osei Kyei Mensah Bonsu - Majority leader of parliament and Minister of Parliamentary affairs
- Professor Ebenezer Oduro Owusu - Vice Chancellor of the University of Ghana
- Anthony Nsiah Asare - Director General, Ghana Health Service
- Archibald Letsa - Volta Regional Minister of Ghana
- Prince Kofi Amoabeng - Ghanaian businessman and a former military officer of the Ghanaian Armed Forces
- Kwaku Kwarteng - Deputy Minister of Finance, Ghana
- Kwabena Kwabena - Highlife musician
- Obrafour - Hiplife musician and rapper
- John Ofori-Tenkorang - Director General of the Social Security and National Insurance Trust (SSNIT)
- Selorm Adadevoh - Chief executive officer of MTN Ghana, a subsidiary of MTN Group
- Magnom - Musician and Music Producer
- Gilbert Asante - Ghanaian photographer

== See also ==
- Education in Ghana
- List of senior high schools in Ghana
- Roman Catholicism in Ghana
