= Yaw Osei Adutwum =

Ghanaian politician (born 1964)

Hon. Dr. Yaw Osei Adutwum
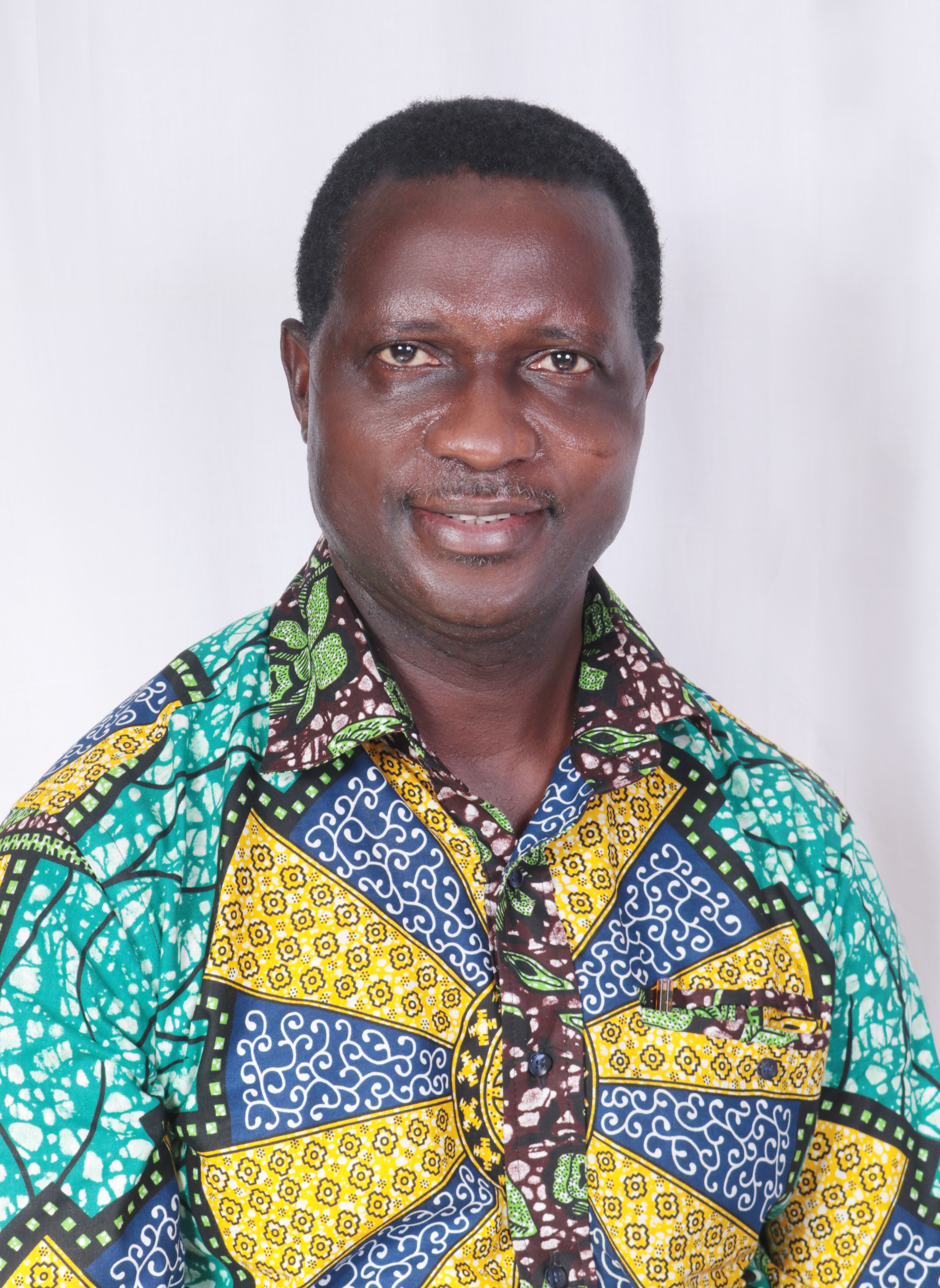

Minister for Education
- In office 5 March 2021 – 6 January 2025
- President: Nana Akufo-Addo
- Preceded by: Matthew Opoku Prempeh
- Succeeded by: Haruna Iddrisu

Member of Ghanaian Parliament for Bosomtwe Constituency
- Incumbent
- Assumed office 7 January 2017
- Preceded by: Simon Osei-Mensah

Deputy Minister for Education
- In office 1 March 2017 – 20 January 2021

Personal details
- Born: 9 April 1964 (age 62) Jachie
- Party: New Patriotic Party
- Education: Kumasi High School; Kwame Nkrumah University of Science and Technology; University of La Verne
- Occupation: Politician
- Committees: Members Holding Offices of Profit Committee; Works and Housing Committee; Poverty Reduction Strategy Committee

Dr. Yaw Osei Adutwum (born 9 April 1964) is a Ghanaian politician and member of the ninth Parliament of the Fourth Republic of Ghana, representing the Bosomtwe Constituency in the Ashanti Region on the ticket of the New Patriotic Party. On 5 March 2021, Adutwum was appointed by President Nana Akufo-Addo as the Minister of Education in Ghana.

== Early life and education ==
Yaw Osei Adutwum hails from Jachie in the Ashanti region of Ghana. He had his secondary education at Kumasi High School in the Ashanti Region of Ghana, where he received his Advanced level education certificate. He obtained a bachelor's degree in Land Economy (Business Administration with a major in Real Estate) from the Kwame Nkrumah University of Science and Technology prior to migrating to the United States. He holds a master's degree in Education Management from the University of La Verne and a PhD in Educational Policy, Planning and Administration from the University of Southern California.

== Career ==
In September 2004, he founded the New Designs Charter Schools in California, USA.

Prior to that, he worked as a Mathematics and Information Technology teacher at the Manual Arts High School for ten years, and within this period, he founded the International Studies Academy, which served as a small learning community for students. He also served as the lead math teacher in the USC/Manual Arts Neighborhood Academic Initiative (NAI). He was also part of the task force established by the National Research Council for Career and Technical Education to develop a national model for career and technical education at the high school and College levels.

On 9 September 2021, Adutwum was appointed as a member of the advisory board of the Capacity Building Center (CBC) in the School of Education and Information Studies at the University of California, Los Angeles (UCLA).

== Initiative ==
On 2022, he granted scholarships to 61 engineering and medical students from his constituency for the 2022 academic year. With this initiative, the total number of students receiving the MP's scholarship for engineering and medicine reaches 91, inching closer to his goal of supporting 100 students within a 10-year timeframe.

== Politics ==
Adutwum is a member of the New Patriotic Party, representing the Bosomtwe constituency in the Ashanti Region of Ghana in the Seventh and Eighth Parliament of the Fourth Republic of Ghana.

=== 2016 election ===
He contested the Bosomtwe Constituency in the Ashanti region of Ghana on the ticket of the New Patriotic Party during the 2016 Ghanaian general election, He obtained 46,238 votes out of the total 54,144 votes cast representing 85.82%, while his closest contender, the then District Chief Executive (DCE) of the Bosomtwe District, Veronica Antwi-Adjei of the National Democratic Congress (NDC), had 7,215 votes, representing 13.39%.

In the seventh parliament, Adutwum served on the Works and Housing and the Poverty Reduction Strategy Committees.

==== 2020 election ====
Adutwum was re-elected as a member of parliament during the 2020 Ghanaian general election with 57,939 votes out of 68,327 total valid votes, representing 84.80%, over Priscilla Mercy Nketia of the National Democratic Congress who had 10, 388 votes representing 15.2% of the total valid votes. He is a member of Members Holding Office of Profit Committee and the Employment and Social Welfare Committee of Parliament.

2024 election

In 2024 election he retained his seat as he won the parliamentary seat for Bosomtwe Constituency against his opponent Abdullah Hamidu of the National Democratic Congress party.

== Minister for Education ==
Adutwum was made the substantive Minister for Education in 2021, having served as Deputy to Mathew Opoku Prempeh for four years in which he helped in the implementation of the Free Senior High School policy.

=== STEM schools ===
Under the leadership of Adutwum, he sets out a plan to construct 35 STEM (Science, Technology, Engineering, and Mathematics) Senior High Schools (SHSs) and 5 STEM universities throughout the country. As a significant step towards this vision, 10 of these STEM SHSs were initiated in 2022. This initiative promotes STEM education and provides students with specialized learning opportunities to excel in these critical fields.

== Awards ==
In 2019, he was voted the Best Performing Deputy Minister by two research bodies: the Alliance for Social Equity and Public Accountability (ASEPA) and FAKS Investigative Services.

== Personal life ==
Adutwum is married with a child. He is a Christian and worships at the Pentecost Church.
