= Gyamerah =

Gyamerah is a Ghanaian surname. Notable people with the surname include:

- Jan Gyamerah (born 1995), Ghanaian footballer
- Nana Osei Gyamerah II (born 1967), Ghanaian businessman and chief of town
