= Simon Osei-Mensah =

Ghanaian politician (born 1961)

Hon. Simon Osei-Mensah

Ashanti Regional Minister
- In office February 2017 – January 2025
- Preceded by: Peter Anarfi-Mensah
- Succeeded by: Dr. Frank Amoakohene

Member of the Ghana Parliament for Bosomtwe Constituency
- In office 7 January 2013 – 6 January 2017
- President: John Mahama
- Succeeded by: Yaw Osei Adutwum

Member of Parliament for Bosomtwe Constituency
- In office 7 January 2009 – 6 January 2013
- President: John Atta Mills; John Mahama

Member of Parliament for Bosomtwe Constituency
- In office 7 January 2005 – 6 January 2009
- President: John Kufuor
- Preceded by: Poku Adu-Gyamfi

Personal details
- Born: 27 May 1961 (age 65)
- Party: New Patriotic Party
- Children: 5
- Education: University of National and World Economy
- Occupation: Economist/Banker

Simon Osei-Mensah (born 27 May 1961) is a Ghanaian politician, a member of the 6th Parliament and 4th Republic of Ghana, and a member of the New Patriotic Party in Ghana. He was the Ashanti Regional minister of Ghana from 2017 to 2025. He was appointed by President Nana Addo Danquah Akuffo-Addo in January 2017 and was approved by the members of parliament in February 2017.

== Early life and education ==
Osei-Mensah was born on 27 May 1961. He is from the town of Jachie in the Ashanti region. He obtained a Master of Science degree in economics from the University of National and World Economy in Sofia, Bulgaria, in 1991. He also has a Certificate in Banking from the Institute of Business in Odense, Denmark, acquired in 1998.

== Career ==
Osei-Mensah is an economist and banker. He worked as an operations manager at Kuapa Kokoo Credit Union before aspiring to political office.

== Political career ==
Osei-Mensah is a member of the New Patriotic Party. He became a member of parliament from January 2005 after emerging winner in the General Election in December 2004. He run for a second and third term and won. He was the MP for Bosomtwe constituency. He was elected as the member of parliament for this constituency in the fourth, fifth and sixth parliaments of the fourth Republic of Ghana. In February 2020, after his party came back into office, he was appointed by President Nana Akuffo-Addo as the Ashanti regional minister.

== Elections ==
Osei-Mensah was elected as the member of parliament for the Bosomtwe constituency of the Ashanti Region for the first time in the 2004 Ghanaian general elections. He won on the ticket of the New Patriotic Party. His constituency was a part of the 36 parliamentary seats out of 39 seats won by the New Patriotic Party in that election for the Ashanti Region. The New Patriotic Party won a majority total of 128 parliamentary seats out of 230 seats. He was elected with 28,052 votes out of 34,225 total valid votes cast equivalent to 82% of total valid votes cast. He was elected over Suleiman Mohammed of the People's National Convention, Edward Isaac Boateng of the National Democratic Congress and Paul Adomako Ansah of the Convention People's Party. These obtained 1.0%, 14.3% and 2.8% respectively of total valid votes cast.

In 2008, he won the general elections on the ticket of the New Patriotic Party for the same constituency. His constituency was part of the 34 parliamentary seats out of 39 seats won by the New Patriotic Party in that election for the Ashanti Region. The New Patriotic Party won a minority total of 109 parliamentary seats out of 230 seats. He was elected with 25,988 votes out of 37,194 total valid votes cast, equivalent to 69.87%, and elected over Suleiman Mohammed of the People's National Convention, Dr. Joseph Oteng Adjei of the National Democratic Congress and Gilbert Adler Alhassan of the Convention People's Party. These obtained 1.46%, 27.67% and 0.99% respectively of the total votes cast.

In 2012, he won the general elections one more time on the ticket of the New Patriotic Party for the same constituency. He was elected with 34,790 votes out of 52,269 total valid votes cast. This was equivalent to 66.56% of total valid votes cast. He was elected over Joe Oteng-Adjei of the National Democratic Congress, Kwame Ofosu Chei of Progressive People's Party and Yaw Wiredu of the People's National Convention. These obtained 32.97%, 0.36% and 0.11% respectively of the total votes cast.

== Personal life ==
Osei-Mensah is a Catholic Christian. He is married with five children.

== See also ==
- List of MPs elected in the 2004 Ghanaian parliamentary election
- List of MPs elected in the 2008 Ghanaian parliamentary election
- List of MPs elected in the 2012 Ghanaian parliamentary election
