= Dedesua =

Town in Bosomtwe District, Ashanti Region, Ghana

- Town
- Location of Dedesua in Ashanti Region
- Coordinates: 06°35′14.42″N 01°36′5.83″W
- Country: Ghana
- Region: Ashanti Region
- District: Bosomtwe District

Population (2012)
  - Total: 1,189
- Time zone: UTC0 (GMT)

Dedesua is a town in the Bosomtwe District in the Ashanti Region of Ghana. As at 2012, the community had a population of 1,189. As at 2021, the Chief of the town was Nana Owusu Sefa Brempong II. In 2026, a 200-acre land in the town was released by Osei Tutu II to the Government of Ghana for a Green City Housing Project. John Mahama cut the sod for the construction of the project.
