= Christopher Benjamin =

Christopher Benjamin may refer to:

- Christopher Benjamin (actor) (1934–2025), English actor
- Christopher Benjamin (politician), American politician
- Chris Benjamin (cricketer) (born 1999), South African cricketer
- Chris Benjamin (journalist) (born 1975), Canadian journalist, novelist and non-fiction writer
