= Nkoranza shooting =

Shooting during a protest in Nkoranza, Ghana

- Location: Nkoranza
- Date: 17 May 2022
- Attack type: Mass shooting
- Deaths: 1
- Injuries: 9
- Perpetrator: Security personnel

On 17 May 2022, one person was shot and killed by the security personnel in Nkoranza, in the Bono East Region of Ghana, and nine others were injured when the youth in the area went on rampage and attacked the Municipal Police headquarters.

== Incident ==
The incident was triggered by the alleged killing of Albert Donkor, a 28-year-old trader by the police whilst in custody. On 25 April 2022, Albert Donkor was arrested in Kasadjan at his mother's house. It was claimed by the Nkoranza Municipal Police Command that he was an armed robber who died during exchange of firearms with them. His family later refuted the claims and said the police picked him up from home into their custody, where he died. Oliver Barker-Vormawor claimed the mother of Albert Donkor visited him and saw him writing his statement and was shot two hours after she left. He said the police intentionally took Albert Donkor in their vehicle and shot him to death. He allegedly said Albert Donkor witnessed police officers committing a robbery and went to report to the police which caused his death. The youth in the community wore red armbands, blocked some roads, threw stones, clubs, torched used car tyres and destroyed properties whilst the police fired live rubber bullets and warning shots. The youth destroyed the Nkoranza District Police Station.

== Perpetrators ==
Kwasi Adu-Gyan, the Bono East Regional Minister claimed he was not aware who gave the Police order to shoot and kill during the clash. He admitted he called for back up when the youth attacked the Nkoranza Police Station for the rescue of his officers.

== Victim ==
One of the protestor, Victor Kwaku Owusu passed whiles receiving treatment at the hospital after he was shot in the head.

== Aftermath ==
The youth in the community freed other suspects who were picked by the Police together with Albert Donkor on allegation of being armed robbers. The Police later arrested two persons involved in the attack. The Police re-arrested a murder suspect who escaped during the mayhem. DCOP Kwesi Ofori in a statement said “additional persons have been arrested in connection with the disturbances, bringing the total number of arrested persons to five."

== Control ==
Personnel from the police and military were present on the main streets in Nkoranza to stop any further brawl between the Police and the youth in the community. The Police in statement said the situation was under control and calm was restored to make way for normal activities to go on.

== Investigation ==
Nana Kwame Baffoe who is the Chief of the Nkoranza Traditional Area called for a swift investigation into the killing of Albert Donkor.

The Government of Ghana was asked by the Commonwealth Human Rights Initiative to conduct an investigation independently into the death of Albert Donkor.

== See also ==
- Ayawaso West-Wuogon violence
- Lamashegu shooting
- Ejura shooting
