= Aputuogya =

Town in the Bosomtwe District, Ghana

Aputuogya, also written Aputuogya or Aputuoja is a town located in the Ashanti Region of Ghana. The community of Aputuogya is located in the Bosomtwe District and is located close to both Abuontem and the settlement of Feyiase.

== Geospatial location ==
Aputuogya can be found on the map with geocodes; Latitude 6° 36' 4" N and Longitude 1° 33' 31" W
