= Ejura shooting =

Mass shooting during a protest in Ejura, Ghana

Ejura shooting, Ghana
- Location: Ejura
- Date: June 28, 2021
- Attack type: Mass shooting
- Deaths: 2
- Injuries: 4
- Perpetrator: Security personnel

On June 28, 2021, two people were shot and killed by the security personnel in Ejura, Ghana and four others were injured during a demonstration which turned violent.

== Incident ==
This incident was triggered by the alleged murder of Ibrahim Mohammed also known as Macho Kaaka, who was a youth activist. It was claimed he was killed by armed men after his frequent criticisms of the government on his social media handle. He was assaulted when he was returning home on motorbike on 26 June 2021. He died at Komfo Anokye Teaching Hospital three days after the attack. The youth in Ejura protested after the death and burial of Kaaka. The protestors blocked the Ejura-Atebubu road thereby causing traffic. The police backed by the military clashed with the protestors which led to the shootings.

== Victims ==
Two young men were killed during the shooting. They were Nasiru Yussif and Murtala Mohammed. Four others were injured after the shooting. Awal Misbawu who was among the injured, got his right leg amputated after a doctor claimed Awal's leg cannot be worked on. Two of the injured were later treated and discharged from the Ejura Government Hospital.

== Perpetrators ==
Simon Osei Mensah, the then Ashanti Regional minister, claimed he called the military as a 'backup' to the police because of information gathered before the incident. He said the youth in Ejura planned to torch the Ejura District Police Station after the burial of Macho Kaaka. Seven military personnel were said to have begun firing warning shots into the air and later directed the shooting into the protestors for about 20 to 30 minutes. Brigadier General Joseph Aphour claimed it was the 'best' action the military could take during the shooting incident.

== Response ==
After the shooting, Nana Akufo-Addo instructed for the formation of a 3-member committee constituted by Ambose Dery to inquire into the sequence of events that led to the shootings at Ejura. The minister was to provide a report of the inquiry and recommendations for action. In September 2021, the government of Ghana released a 54-page report made by the committee ordered by the president Nana Akufo-Addo. The family of Maacho Kaaka rejected the report made by the committee.

National Peace Council released a statement condemning the incident and called for "investigations into the matter without delay". The council also expressed its condolences to the bereaved families and also cautioned media houses to control their pronouncement in the incident.

Organizations such as NCCE, the Federation of Muslims Councils of Ghana and the Ghana Catholic Bishops Conference released statements cautioning the security personnel in Ghana to be professional in maintaining order during demonstrations. Occupy Ghana also condemned the incidents by the military.

Mahamudu Bawumia, Osman Nuhu Sharubutu, Albert Kan-Dapaah, Simon Osei-Mensah and others went to Ejura to sympathize with bereaved families and the people in the community.

Ghanaian celebrities such as Kwesi Arthur, Sarkodie, Shatta Wale, Medikal, Edem, Wanlov, Trigmatic, Yvonne Nelson, Efia Odo, Lydia Forson, Prince David Osei, DKB, D-Black and Stonebowy also condemned the shooting incident.

== Compensation ==
On February 5, 2022, the Government of Ghana presented a check of GHS500,000 to the two families who lost their members during the shooting. Each family received GHS250,000 each. The Ejura Chief, Barimah Osei Hwedie II praised the government for the help and assistance.

== See also ==
- Ayawaso West-Wuogon violence
- Lamashegu shooting
- Nkoranza shooting
