= Chris Benjamin =

Chris Benjamin may refer to:

- Chris Benjamin (cricketer) (born 1999), South African cricketer
- Chris Benjamin (journalist) (born 1975), Canadian journalist
