= Rebecca Akweley Adotey =

Ghanaian politician

Hon. Rebecca Akweley Adotey

Member of Parliament for Ayawaso West-Wuogon Constituency
- In office 7 January 1996 – 6 January 2001

Personal details
- Party: National Democratic Congress
- Occupation: Executive secretary
- Profession: Politician

Rebecca Akweley Adotey is a Ghanaian politician. She was an executive secretary for the National Council for Women and Development and a member of parliament for the Ayawaso West-Wuogon constituency.

== Early life and education ==
Akweley Adotey holds a Bachelor of Arts in English. She was an educationist (assistant director) and an executive secretary for the National Council for Women and Development.

== Politics ==
As a politician, Akweley Adotey stood for the position of a member of parliament for the Ayawaso West-Wuogon Constituency in the year 1996. She contested and won in the 1996 Ghanaian general elections, on the ticket of the National Democratic Congress with a total valid votes of 15,089, representing 35.10%. This was against her opponents; George Isaac Amoo of the New Patriotic Party, who polled 14,795 votes, which represented 34.40% of the total valid votes; Andrews La-Anyane of the People's National Convention, who polled 1,127 votes, representing 2.60% of the total valid votes; Joyce Abla Tamaklo, an independent candidate, polled 855 votes, representing 2.00% of the total valid votes; and Jane Chinebuah of the Convention People's Party polled 852, which represented 2.00% of the total valid votes cast.
