= Zosimli Naa =

The Zosimli Naa is a royal title in Ghana. It directly translates as Chief of Zosimli. The title, Naa translates as King or Chief while Zosimli means: Cooperation, Alliance, Accord, Collaboration and Friendships. The Tamale-Louisville sister city relationship is administered under the office of a Zosimli Naa. The Zosimli Palace is located in Lamashegu, Tamale. The relationship between The Kingdom of Dagbon and Europe is also administered, separately, under the office of a Zo-simli Naa.

== History ==
The first Zosimli was Her Royal Highness, Naa Dr. Susan J Herlin. In 2022, a new Zosimli Naa, HRH Naa Ife Bell Tipaɣya was enskinned at a colorful ceremony.

== Genealogy ==
| Naa Susan; First Zosimli Naa. Beloved across the Kingdom of Dagbon. 1995–2014 |
| Naa Ife Bell Tipaɣya; Enskinned in 2021; 2021–present |

== Roles of Zosimli Naa ==
The Office of Zosimli Naa is an institution dedicated to promoting and fostering development initiatives within the chieftaincy.

== Dakpema Zosimli ==
In 2021, The Tamale Dakpema, HRH Fuseini Bawa, enskinned Kennedy S Johnson as Dakpema Zosimli Naa. The Dakpema Zosimli acts within the principality (Dakpamli) of the Dakpema. The role of the Dakpema is the governance of markets within Tamale.

The enskinment of Kennedy S Johnson as Dakpema Zosimli Naa by HRH Fuseini Bawa in 2021 marked a significant cultural milestone in Tamale. The Dakpema Zosimli Naa plays a pivotal role within the Dakpamli, assisting in the governance and administration under the authority of the Dakpema.
