= Emmanuel Kwabena Kyeremateng Agyarko =

Ghanaian politician (1957–2018)

Emmanuel Kwabena Kyeremateng Agyarko (10 December 1957 – 21 November 2018) was a Ghanaian politician from the New Patriotic Party (NPP). He served as the member of Parliament for the Ayawaso West Wuogon Constituency in Accra from 2012 until his death in 2018.

== Biography ==
He was a pharmacist by training and attended the Kwame Nkrumah University of Science and Technology, where he received an undergraduate degree in pharmacy. His mother was from Krobo Odumase in the Eastern Region of Ghana and his father from Jamasi in the Ashanti Region. He was married and had seven children. He died on 21 November 2018 after a short illness for which he had undergone corrective surgery.

He came from a political family. His brother, Boakye Agyarko served as the energy minister in the first NPP administration of Nana Akuffo Addo and also served as the chief executive officer of the Food and Drugs Board. His sister, Dedo Difie Agyarko-Kusi, is Ghana's current ambassador to South Korea and a former Parliamentary candidate for Lower Manya Krobo on the ticket of the NPP.

Agyarko was also the chairperson of the Environment, Science and Technology Committee of Parliament and once served on the Government's Assurance and Health Committees.

== Politics ==
Agyarko was a member of New Patriotic Party and was a member of Seventh Parliament of the Fourth Republic of Ghana representing the Ayawaso West Wuogon constituency in the Greater Accra Region.

=== 2016 election ===
Agyarko contested the Ayawaso West Wuogon constituency parliamentary seat on the ticket of New Patriotic Party during the 2016 Ghanaian general election and won with 32,591 votes representing 57.32% of the total. He was elected over Delali Kwasi Brempong of the National Democratic Congress, who polled 22,534 votes, which is equivalent to 39.63%, parliamentary candidate for the PPP William Dowokpor had 1,099 votes representing 1.93% and the parliamentary candidate for the Convention People's Party Kweku Quansah had 638 votes representing 1.12% of the total.

== Personal life ==
He was a Christian and married with seven children.

== Death ==
The formerly member of Parliament for Ayawaso West Wuogon constituency died 21 November 2018 in the United States where he was receiving to treatment. The cause of his death, at the Yale–New Haven Hospital, was reportedly acid reflux and a malignant gallbladder infection.

Parliament of Ghana
Preceded by Akosua Frema Osei-Opare	Member of Parliament for Ayawaso West; 2012 – 2018	Succeeded by Lydia Alhassan
