= Bosomtwe (Ghana parliament constituency) =

Constituency in the Ashanti Region of Ghana

- constituency for the Parliament of Ghana
- District: Bosomtwe
- Region: Ashanti Region of Ghana

Current constituency
- Party: New Patriotic Party
- MP: Yaw Osei Adutwum

Bosomtwe is one of the constituencies represented in the Parliament of Ghana. It elects one Member of Parliament (MP) by the first past the post system of election. It is located in the Bosomtwe District of the Ashanti Region of Ghana.

== Boundaries ==
Bosomtwe is located in the Bosomtwe District of the Ashanti Region of Ghana.

== Members of Parliament ==
Election	Member	Party
1992	Yaw Addai Boadu	EGLE
1996	Poku Adu-Gyamfi	New Patriotic Party
2000	Poku Adu-Gyamfi	New Patriotic Party
2004	Simon Osei Mensah	New Patriotic Party
2008	Simon Osei Mensah	New Patriotic Party
2012	Simon Osei Mensah	New Patriotic Party
2016	Yaw Osei Adutwum	New Patriotic Party
2020	Yaw Osei Adutwum	New Patriotic Party
2024	Yaw Osei Adutwum	New Patriotic Party

== Elections ==
2008 Ghanaian parliamentary election: Bosomtwe Source: Ghana Home Page
Party	Candidate	Votes	%	±%
New Patriotic Party	Simon Osei-Mensah	25,988	69.9	—
National Democratic Congress	Joseph Oteng Adjei	10,293	27.7	—
People's National Convention	Suleiman Mohammed	543	1.5	—
Convention People's Party	Gilbert Adler Alhassan	370	1.0	—
Majority		15,695	42.2	—
Turnout				

== See also ==
- List of Ghana Parliament constituencies
