= Dedo Difie Agyarko-Kusi =

Ghanaian politician and diplomat

Her Excellency Dedo Difie Agyarko-Kusi

Ambassador of Ghana to South Korea
- Incumbent
- Assumed office July 2017
- President: Nana Akuffo-Addo

Personal details
- Born: Dedo Difie Agyarko Ghana
- Party: New Patriotic Party
- Relations: Boakye Agyarko (brother); Emmanuel Kwabena Kyeremateng Agyarko (brother)

Dedo Difie Agyarko-Kusi is a Ghanaian politician. She served as Ghana's Ambassador to South Korea. She is a member of the New Patriotic Party. She is the sister of the Emmanuel Kwabena Kyeremateng Agyarko and Boakye Agyarko. She once served as a translator of French and Spanish for UNESCO.

== Early life and education ==
Agyarko-Kusi attended Wesley Girls' Senior High School. She later went the University of Ghana where she acquired her Bachelor of Arts degree in French. Kusi also holds a masters of law from the University of Paris.

== Politics ==
Kusi has served as a member of the NPP national council and also parliamentary candidate for Lower Manya Krobo in the Eastern Region.

== Career ==
=== Ambassador to South Korea ===
In July 2017, President Nana Akuffo-Addo named Agyarko-Kusi as Ghana's High Commissioner to South Korea. She was among the Ghanaians who were named to head various diplomatic Ghanaian missions across the world. She was sworn in on 2 August 2017 by the Nana Akufo-Addo.

== Personal life ==
Kusi is the sister of Boakye Agyarko and Emmanuel Kwabena Kyeremateng Agyarko.

Married to UN diplomat and lawyer, Jonathan Kusi (deceased)

3 children Kwame Atta-Kusi, Abena Bonbhel, Kwaku Atta-Kusi (deceased)
