= Selorm Adadevoh =

Ghanaian business and technology executive

- Born: Selorm Adadevoh; Ghana
- Education: Kwame Nkrumah University of Science and Technology (BSc.Civil Engineering), Wharton School of the University of Pennsylvania (MBA Finance and Strategic Management)
- Occupations: Business and Technology Executive
- Employers: Hewlett-Packard; L.E.K. Consulting; Tigo Ghana; Digicel Haiti; MTN Ghana

Selorm Adadevoh is a Ghanaian business and technology executive. He is the current chief commercial officer of the MTN Group, and former chief executive officer of MTN Ghana. He has worked as a telecommunication, business leader and consultant in Africa, the Caribbean, UK and US.

== Early life and education ==
Adadevoh had his secondary school education at St. Peter's Boys Senior High School. He holds a Bachelor of Science degree in civil engineering from Kwame Nkrumah University of Science and Technology (KNUST), Ghana and a Master's in Business Administration (MBA) in Finance and Strategic Management from The Wharton School of University of Pennsylvania, USA.

== Career ==
Adadevoh started his career and worked for 10 years as a technology consultant initially for Hewlett-Packard (HP) in the UK, where he served as an advisor to companies like Hutchison 3G, Vodafone, FTSE 100 and later as a Management Consultant at L.E.K. Consulting in the USA where he worked on Mergers, Acquisitions and Private Equity consulting projects for companies like the United Airlines, Jetblue, Procter & Gamble, Pfizer, Laidlaw and many others.

He later moved to Ghana to work as the chief commercial officer (CCO) and Head of Mobile Financial Services (MFS) for Tigo (Millicom) Ghana. In his role as CCO and Head of the MFS especially, he was responsible for ensuring the boost of the mobile money industry in Ghana concerning Tigo and other networks as well.

Adadevoh was later appointed as Global Director for Mobile Financial Services (MFS) at Digicel, Haiti in December 2014. He went on to work there for three years rising from his role as Global Director of MFS to Chief Operations Officer (COO) of Digicel in May 2015 and eventually his rise to chief executive officer (CEO) of Digicel, Haiti in March 2016, which is the largest of Digicel's 32 operations throughout the world.

In June 2018, Adadevoh was appointed as CEO of MTN Ghana, a subsidiary of MTN Group. He took over from Ebenezer Asante who had been promoted to Vice President of the MTN Group. He was awarded the Marketing Man of the Year 2020 at the 32nd Annual National Marketing Performance Awards organised by the Chartered Institute of Marketing.

In December 2023, he was appointed Chief Commercial Officer of the MTN Group.

== Boards and other works ==
Adadevoh is a board member of Women's World Banking Ghana (WWBG), Sahel Grains Ltd and Digital Impact Alliance (DIAL) which is funded by the UN Foundation. He is a TEDx fellow, and a member of the African Leadership Network (ALN).
