= John Ofori-Tenkorang =

Ghanaian engineer and academic

- Education: St. Peter's Boys Senior High School; Pearson College UWC; MIT (BS, MS, PhD)
- Occupations: Academic; Electrical Engineer; Investment Banker; Civil Servant
- Known for: Director General, Social Security and National Insurance Trust

John Ofori-Tenkorang is a Ghanaian public servant, an investment banker, an engineer and an academic who was the Director General of Social Security and National Insurance Trust (SSNIT) from 2017 to 2024.

== Early life and education ==
An ethnic Fante, Ofori-Tenkorang had his secondary education at St. Peter's Boys Senior High School, Nkwatia Kwahu. He proceeded to Pearson College UWC in Victoria, British Columbia, Canada. There, he obtained his International Baccalaureate Diploma. He enrolled at the Massachusetts Institute of Technology, where he earned his bachelor's, master's and doctorate degrees in electrical engineering and computer science.

== Career ==
Ofori-Tenkorang began his career as an instructor at the Massachusetts Institute of Technology. He developed propulsion systems and novel electric motors for electric vehicles for Ford Motor Company. He also worked for Quantum Corporation, Milpitas and Lutron Electronics Company in Coopersburg, Pennsylvania, Puerto Rico, and St. Kitts. He later joined the American International Group (AIG) where he worked with its financial subsidiary; AIG Trading Group. He became assistant vice president and later vice president of the group. He later joined AIG Financial Products Corporation (AIFP) and Banque AIG serving as its executive director. He was transferred to South Africa where he was responsible for the company's investment activities in Africa. In 2006, he left AIG to join Gödel Commodities Management, United States of America and Dubai Natural Resources World, United Arab Emirates.

He later returned to Ghana in 2016 to work at the office of the vice president as a technical adviser. He was appointed Director General of Social Security and National Insurance Trust (SSNIT) in 2017.

In 1991, Ofori-Tenkorang, David Otten and Leo Casey invented a "potentiometer state sensing circuit" in the US.

== Personal life ==
Aside from English, Ofori-Tenkorang is fluent in the French language. He is a member of the Tau Beta Pi society, Eta Kappa Nu society and Sigma XI Honour society.

== Awards and honours ==
Ofori-Tenkorang won the Carlton E. Tucker Teaching Award for Best Teacher at Massachusetts Institute of Technology. In addition, he has received the following awards:

- Outstanding Public Service Personality of the Year, 2022
- 2022 IT-Oriented Business Leadership Personality of the Year (Public Sector)
- Overall Best CEO of the Year, 2021
- Award for Outstanding Leadership and Contribution towards the Welfare of Pensioners, 2020
- 2020 Best CEO of State-Owned Enterprises
- Most Impressive Leader of the Decade, The Initiators of Change Foundation (ICF)
- Outstanding Director–General for the Year, 2018
- Induction into the West Africa Nobles Forum (WANF)

== Selected works ==
- Ofori-Tenkorang, J. (1997), "Permanent-magnet synchronous motors and associated power electronics for direct-drive vehicle propulsion", Ph.D. Thesis, Massachusetts Institute of Technology, Cambridge, MA, USA.
- Ofori-Tenkorang, J., Chapman, J., Lesieutre, B. C. (1996). "Transient and Stability Analysis of Time-Domain Reactive Current Analyzers using Averaged Waveforms"; IEEE Transactions on Instrumentation and Measurement, Volume 45, Issue 1, February 1996, pp. 280–287.
- Ofori-Tenkorang, J., Lang, J. H. (1995). "A Comparative Analysis Torque Production in Halbach and Conventional Surface-Mounted Permanent Magnet Synchronous Motors"; IEEE-IAS Annual Meeting, Orlando, FL, U.S.A, pp. 657–663.
- Ofori-Tenkorang, J., Lang, J. H. (1994), "Halbach Permanent Magnet Motors: A Candidate for Direct Drive Wheel Motors"; Universities Power Engineering Conference, Galway, Ireland, pp. 17–20.
- Ofori-Tenkorang, J., (1993). "A Microprocessor-Based Interactive Home Energy Monitor"; S.M. Thesis, Massachusetts Institute of Technology, Cambridge, MA, USA.
- Ofori-Tenkorang, K. M. (1993). "Wireless Telecommunications with Microwave Digital Radio", African Technology Forum, New Age Telecommunications, Volume 6, No. 2.
- Casey, L. F., Ofori-Tenkorang, J., Schlect, M. F. (1991). "CMOS Drive and Control Circuitry for 1-10 MHz Power Conversion"; IEEE Transactions on Power Electronics, Volume 6, Issue 4, 1991, pp. 749–758.
- Ofori-Tenkorang, J. (1989). "A Microprocessor-Controlled Household Power Monitoring Unit"; S.B. Thesis, Massachusetts Institute of Technology, Cambridge, MA, USA.

== See also ==
- List of Akufo-Addo government ministers and political appointees
- Social Security and National Insurance Trust
