= Ken Attafuah =

Ghanaian criminologist and human rights advocate

Prof. Professor Ken Attafuah

Executive Secretary of National Identification Authority
- In office January 2017 – November 2024
- President: Nana Akuffo-Addo

Personal details
- Born: Kenneth Agyeman Attafuah Ghana
- Party: New Patriotic Party
- Spouse: Joyce Agyeman Attafuah
- Children: 4
- Education: Jachie-Pramso Secondary School, St. Peter's Boys Secondary School, University of Ghana, University of Manitoba, Simon Fraser University
- Occupation: Lecturer
- Profession: Lawyer and Criminologist/ Government Consultant

Kenneth Agyeman Attafuah is a licensed Ghanaian criminologist, mediator, management consultant, and human rights advocate. He is a member of the New Patriotic Party of Ghana. From January 2017 to November 9, 2024 he served as the Head of the National Identification Authority and championed the implementation of the National Identity Card dubbed “Ghana Card”.

== Early life and education ==
Attafuah was born in the Ashanti Region of Ghana, the youngest of seven children. Though his parents were illiterate farmers, they valued education and ensured all their children attended school regularly. He started his primary education at Juaso Local Authority Primary School in Juaso. He has often described his early education as an unhappy one. He was not a brilliant child and the constant comparison with his twin brother did not help. He considered schooling as an institution for bullying and tyranny. He attributes his change of view to one of his primary school teachers who encouraged him to read Bible stories and use them to develop his intellect. He soon became the best student in his class.

Attafuah sat for his Common Entrance Examination in form two and gained admission into Prempeh College. However, he could not afford the admission fees and so lost his place in the school. He later enrolled at Jachie-Pramso Secondary School near Lake Bosumtwi. The school's campus was spread over the twin towns of Jachie and Pramso, this meant that his daily commute on foot from the boarding house to classroom was about 8 kilometres (5.0 mi). The school's boarding house was a converted cocoa shed. Since the shed was old and lacking renovation, its roof leaked whenever it rained. At secondary school, Attafuah became the president of the debating society, which allowed him to debate with students from all over Ghana on various secondary school campuses. After writing his GCE Ordinary Level examination, he gained admission to St. Peter's Boys Senior High School.

After completing his GCE Advanced Level he gained admission into the University of Ghana to pursue courses in sociology, political science, and philosophy. He graduated in 1982 with a Bachelor of Arts degree.

== Working life ==
Attafuah did his National Service at the University of Ghana as a teaching assistant until 1983. He was appointed as a tutor at the Abuakwa State College in Kibi in the Eastern Region of Ghana. Whilst at Abuakwa, he applied for and gained a scholarship from the Volta Aluminum Company Trust Fund to pursue a master's degree from the University of Manitoba, Winnipeg, Canada. Upon completion of the programme, he enrolled at the Simon Fraser University for a Doctor of Philosophy in criminology.

He returned to Ghana and was called to the Ghana Bar as a Barrister-at-Law and Solicitor of the Supreme Court of Ghana. As a legal practitioner he has held many positions in Ghana and around the world. He was appointed the Executive Secretary of Ghana's National Reconciliation Commission from 2002 to 2004. In 2008 he published the book Fighting Armed Robbery in Ghana. He has actively advocated for the well-being of prisoners in Ghana and promoted activities that will reduce crime in the country. He received an award from the Chartered Institute of Marketing Ghana in recognition of his advocacy on issues that promote accountability and transparency from public officials.

== Head of National Identification Authority ==
In January 2017, President Nana Akufo-Addo appointed Attafuah as acting head of the National Identification Authority. At the time of his appointment, he was the Dean of the Faculty of Law at Central University in Ghana. Whilst at Central University, he was voted the head of Convocation.

As head of the identification authority, Attafuah oversees the nationwide rollout of the Ghana card - a modern identification system and a smart identity card for Ghanaians.

== Positions held and awards ==
Attafuah has held several positions during the course of his working life. They include:

- Adjudicator with the Canadian Immigration and Refugee Board
- Commissioner for Human Rights in British Columbia, Canada
- Management Consultant to the United Nations Mission in Liberia
- UN's International Technical Advisor to the Truth and Reconciliation Commission of Liberia
- Associate Professor of Governance and Leadership at the Ghana Institute of Professional Studies, GIMPA
- Director of Anti-Corruption, Commission on Human Rights and Administrative Justice
- Chief Investigator and Director of Operation at CHRAJ
- Crime Prevention Policy Advisor/Analyst, Royal Canadian Mounted Police, West Vancouver Detachment, Canada
- Managing Solicitor of Ken Attafuah Law Place
- Executive Secretary of the National Reconciliation Commission
- Dean of the Faculty of Law for Central University

Awards

In the 2022 Entrepreneur and Corporate Executive awards, he won the Outstanding Public Service CEO in the Digital Information and Technology category.

== Personal life ==
Ken Attafuah and Joyce, his wife tied the knot on 31 December 1999.Attafuah and his wife Joyce have four children. He is the father of Businessman, politician and former National Service Personnel Association of Parliament President and Policy Analyst, Nana Boansi Agyeman Attafuah.

Political offices
Preceded by	Head of NIA; 2017 -	Incumbent
