= Nana Osei Gyamerah II =

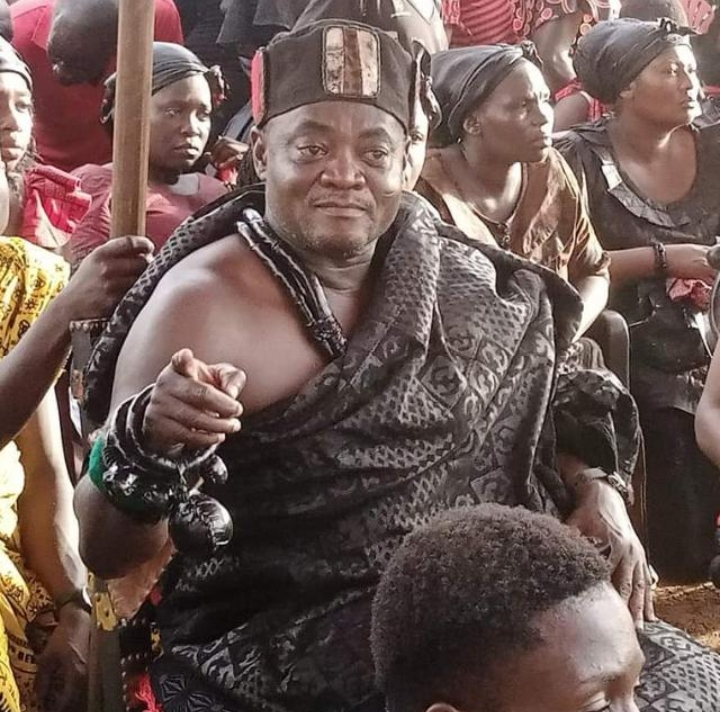
Nana Osei Afriyie Gyamerah II

Nana Osei Afriyie Gyamerah II, also known as "Nana Piasehene" or "The Chief of Piase"; (né Frank Richard Anokye), is a Ghanaian businessman enstooled as chief of the town of Piase in the Ashanti Region.

Born on 7 April 1967 in Kumasi, Ashanti Region, he was enstooled as chief Nana Osei Afriyie Gyamerah on 26 April 2004 after the death of the previous chief, Nana Atta Fosu. In 2018, he was reportedly the victim of assault by a rival chief and his gang during a meeting in Kuntenase.

Nana Osei Afriyie Gyamerah II
Reign	26 April 2004 – Present
Enstoolment	26 April 2004
Predecessor	Nana Atta Fosu II
Born	Frank Richard Anokye, 7 April 1967, Kumasi, Ghana
Spouse	Angelina Osei (m. 2011)
