= Royal Highness =

Style of address and reference

Royal Highness is a style, or form of address, used to address or refer to some members of royal families, usually princes or princesses. Kings and their female consorts, as well as queens regnant, are usually styled Majesty. The most common association of this term to a royal family is to the British royal family.

When used as a direct form of address, spoken or written, it takes the form Your Royal Highness. When used as a third-person reference, it is gender-specific (His Royal Highness or Her Royal Highness, both abbreviated HRH) and in plural, Their Royal Highnesses (TRH).

It is used also for hereditary members of former reigning royal houses.

== Origin ==
By the 17th century, all local rulers in Italy adopted the style Highness, which was once used by kings and emperors only. According to Denis Diderot's Encyclopédie, the style of Royal Highness was created on the insistence of Archduke Ferdinand of Austria, Cardinal-Infante of Spain, a younger son of King Philip III of Spain. The archduke was travelling through Italy on his way to the Low Countries and, upon meeting Victor Amadeus I, Duke of Savoy, refused to address him as Highness unless the Duke addressed him as Royal Highness. Thus, the first use of the style Royal Highness was recorded in 1633. Gaston, Duke of Orléans, younger son of King Henry IV of France, encountered the style in Brussels and assumed it himself. His children later used the style, considering it their prerogative as grandchildren of France.

By the 18th century, Royal Highness had become the prevalent style for members of a continental European reigning dynasty whose head bore the hereditary title of king or queen. The titles of family members of non-hereditary rulers (e.g., the Holy Roman Emperor, King of Poland, Princes of Moldavia and Wallachia—and even the kin of the Princes of Orange who held hereditary leadership though not monarchical position in much of the Netherlands, etc.) were less clear, varying until rendered moot in the 19th century. After dissolution of the Holy Roman Empire in 1806, several of Germany's prince-electors and other now sovereign rulers assumed the title of grand duke and with it, for themselves, their eldest sons and consorts, the style of Royal Highness (Baden, Hesse, Mecklenburg, Saxe-Weimar).

== African usage ==
The vast majority of African royalty that make use of titles such as prince, chief and sheikh, eschew the attendant styles often encountered in Europe. Even in the cases of the aforesaid titles, they usually only exist as courtesies and may or may not have been recognised by a reigning fons honorum. However, some traditional leaders and their family members use royal styles when acting in their official roles as representatives of sovereign or constituent states, distinguishing their status from others who may use or claim traditional titles.

For example, the Nigerian traditional rulers of the Yoruba are usually styled using the HRH The X of Y method, even though they are confusingly known as kings in English and not the princes that the HRH style usually suggests. The chiefly appellation "Kabiyesi" (lit. 'He/She whose words are beyond question') is likewise used as the equivalent of the HRH and other such styles by this class of royalty when rendering their full titles in the Yoruba language.

Furthermore, the wives of the king of the Zulu peoples, although all entitled to the title of queen, do not share their husband's style of Majesty but instead are each addressed as Royal Highness, with the possible exception of the great wife.

Another example, The Zosimli Naa is a female chieftaincy title in Ghana. The first Zosimli was Her Royal Highness, Naa Dr. Susan J Herlin. In 2022, a new Zosimli Naa, HRH Naa Ife Bell was enskinned at a colorful ceremony.

== Denmark and Sweden ==
In contrast to some other European kingdoms, the kingdoms of Denmark and Sweden by royal decree reserve the superior style of Royal Highness only to the children of the monarch and the children of the crown prince.

== Holy Roman Empire ==
The title of Archduke or Archduchess of Austria was known to be complemented with the style of Royal Highness for all non-reigning members of the House of Habsburg and later the House of Habsburg-Lorraine. Even though the Habsburgs held the Imperial crown of the Holy Roman Empire, it was nominally an elective office that could not be hereditarily transmitted, so the non-reigning family members adopted the style of members of the hereditary Royal family of Hungary, Croatia and Bohemia, etc.

This changed when Francis I of Austria dissolved the Holy Roman Empire in 1806, as the Archduchy of Austria was elevated to an Empire in 1804; the members of the House of Habsburg-Lorraine abandoned the style of Royal Highness in favour of the style of Imperial and Royal Highness to reflect the creation of the Empire of Austria.

At the Congress of Vienna in 1815, the former empress Marie Louise of France was restored to her Imperial and Royal style and granted the title of Duchess of Parma, Piacenza and Guastalla, as well as being restored to her premarital title of Archduchess and Imperial Princess of Austria, Royal Princess of Hungary, Croatia and Bohemia.

== Burma ==
The title of "Prince/Princess of the Burma with the accompanying style of HRH; direct translation of Burmese: Myint Myat Taw Mu Hla Thaw.

In Burmese Royal order called for Prince: Shwe Ko Daw Gyi Phaya; Taw Phya. For Princess: Hteik Su Gyi Phaya or Hteik Su Myat Phaya; Su Phya. That title used for Royal descendants of King Thibaw use that royal title.

Another Kongbaung Dynasty King's Descendants Prince and Princess are use His/ Her Imperial Royal Highness (Royal title).

- A former monarch upon abdication.
- The heir apparent to the throne.

== Netherlands ==
The title of "Prince/Princess of the Netherlands" with the accompanying style of HRH is or may be granted by law to the following classes of persons:

- A former monarch upon abdication.
- The heir apparent to the throne.
- The husband of a female monarch.
- The spouse of the heir apparent.
- The legitimate children of the monarch and the wife of any legitimate son of the monarch.
- The legitimate children of the heir apparent.

A separate title of "Prince/Princess of Orange-Nassau" may be granted by law to members of the Dutch royal house or, as a personal and non-hereditary title to former members of the royal house within three months of loss of membership. A Prince/Princess of Orange-Nassau who is not also a Prince/Princess of the Netherlands is addressed as "His/Her Highness" without the predicate "royal". That is the case for example of the children of Princess Margriet, younger daughter of the late Queen Juliana.

Finally, members of the royal house or former members of the royal house within three months of loss of their membership may be also inducted by royal decree into the Dutch nobility with a rank lower than prince/princess and, generally, the accompanying style of "His/Her Highborn Lord/Lady". That is the case for example of the children of the younger brother of King Willem-Alexander, Prince Constantijn, who were given the titles of "Count/Countess of Orange-Nassau" and the honorific predicate of "Jonkheer/Jonkvrouw van Amsberg", both hereditary in the male line. They were also given the surname "Van Oranje-Nassau van Amsberg.

== Norway ==
In Norway the style of Royal Highness is reserved for the children of the monarch and the eldest child of the heir apparent. Other children of the heir apparent have the style Highness.

== Spain ==
In Spain, the prince or princess of Asturias, their spouse and the infantes of Spain bear the style of Royal Highness. The infantes are the children of the monarch and the children of the prince or princess of Asturias. Their spouses are not infantes by marriage and do not bear the style of Royal Highness, although they usually bear the ducal title of their spouse along with the style of The Most Excellent, also used by the children of the infantes and the grandees of Spain.

The consort of a queen regnant bears the title of prince and the style of Royal Highness, although the last male consort, spouse of Queen Isabella II, was elevated to the dignity of king consort with the style of Majesty.

Finally, a regent designated outside of the royal family in the cases provided by law would bear the simpler style of Highness.

== Sweden ==
When Victoria, Crown Princess of Sweden married commoner Olof Daniel Westling in 2010, the Swedish Royal Court announced that Westling would become "Prince Daniel" and "Duke of Västergötland", corresponding in form to the style used by Swedish princes of royal birth, including Victoria's younger brother Prince Carl Philip, Duke of Värmland, i.e. Prince + Given name + Duke of [province]. Thus Westling was made a prince of Sweden and was granted the style Royal Highness, making him an official member of the Swedish royal family.

Princess Madeleine, Duchess of Hälsingland and Gästrikland married the commoner British-American banker Christopher O'Neill in 2013, but she did not adopt the surname O'Neill and instead retained the Bernadotte surname as do her children, and retained the style of Royal Highness. Christopher O'Neill kept his own name, unlike his brother-in-law Prince Daniel (above). O'Neill was not granted royal status and has remained a private citizen, since he wished to retain his British and United States citizenships and his business. He declined Swedish citizenship and for that reason could not be a member of the Swedish Royal Family or Duke of Hälsingland and Gästrikland (his wife's titles). To remain Swedish royalty and have succession rights to the Swedish throne, the couple's children will have to be raised in Sweden and as members of the Church of Sweden.

Three of the sisters of King Carl XVI Gustaf were granted honorary titles of Princess (without nationality) when they married commoners but lost their Royal Highness status, as did two of his uncles earlier in the 20th century.

In October 2019, the grandchildren of King Carl XVI Gustaf retained the titles of Prince or Princess but lost the style of Royal Highness, except for the children of the Crown Princess Victoria.

== Saudi Arabia ==
Sons, daughters, patrilineal grandsons and granddaughters of Ibn Saud are referred to by the style "His/Her Royal Highness" (HRH), differing from those belonging to the cadet branches, who are called "His/Her Highness" (HH) and in addition to that a reigning king has the title of Custodian of the Two Holy Mosques.

== United Kingdom ==
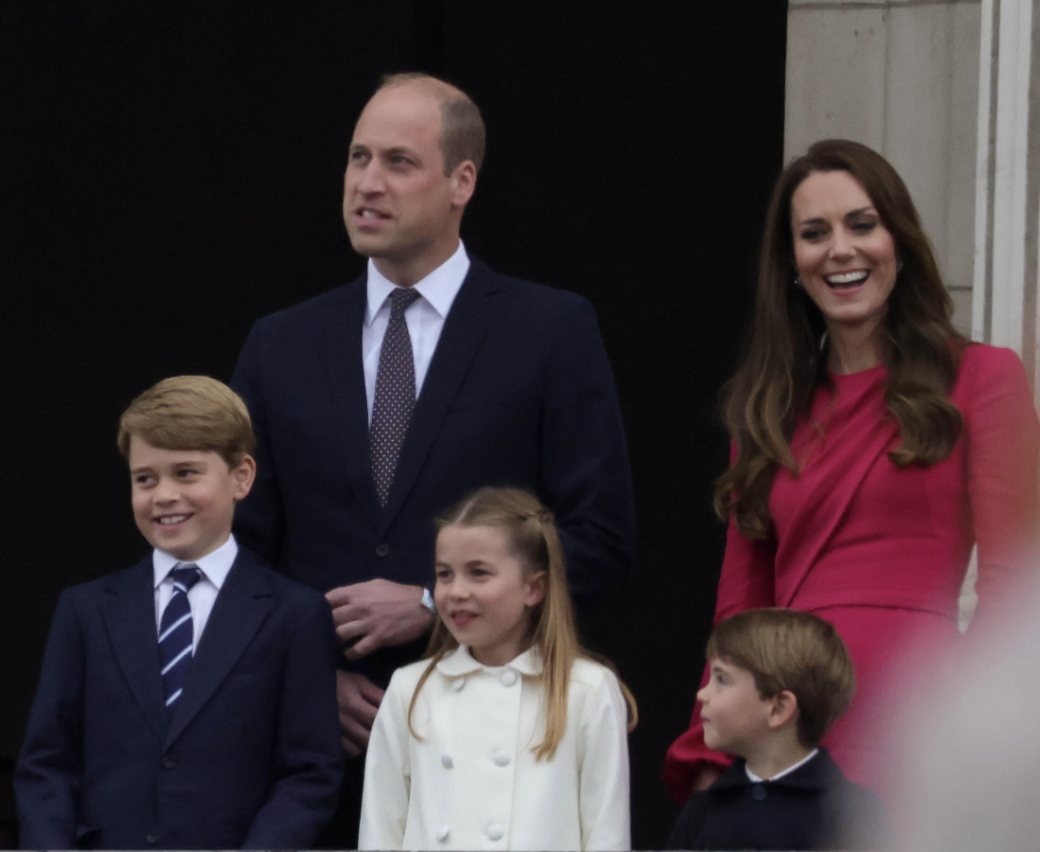
William, Prince of Wales and his family (pictured) all use royal highness as princes and princesses of the United Kingdom.

In British constitutional law, use of the style HRH or simply "Royal Highness" may only be conferred by letters patent. Since 1917, the style has usually been restricted to children of the monarch, or to male-line grandchildren (i.e., the children of the monarch's sons). (Note: "The children of sons of any Sovereign of Great Britain and Ireland are entitled to the style of "Royal Highness", this privilege having been conferred upon them by letters patent.) It is typically associated with the rank of prince or princess (although this has not always applied, an exception being Prince Philip, Duke of Edinburgh, who received the style in 1947 prior to his marriage to Princess Elizabeth but was not formally created a British prince until 1957). When a prince has another title such as Duke (or a princess the title of Duchess), they may be called HRH The Duke of .... For instance HRH The Duke of Connaught was a prince and a member of the royal family. When Edward VIII abdicated the throne in 1936 he was granted the style and title of HRH The Duke of Windsor. The woman he then married became the Duchess of Windsor, but she was denied the style HRH. Edward for much of the rest of his life attempted unsuccessfully to persuade the crown to grant her the style.

According to letters patent issued by King George V in 1917, the sons and daughters of sovereigns and the male-line grandchildren of sovereigns are entitled to the style. It is for this reason that the daughters of Andrew Mountbatten-Windsor (formerly, the Duke of York), Princess Beatrice and Princess Eugenie, carry the HRH status, but the children of Anne, Princess Royal, Peter Phillips and Zara Tindall, do not. Louise and James, the grandchildren of Queen Elizabeth II, at the request of their parents, Prince Edward, Duke of Edinburgh and Sophie, Duchess of Edinburgh, are styled as the children of a duke, and thus are known as Lady Louise Mountbatten-Windsor and Earl of Wessex. Under George V's letters patent, only the eldest son of the eldest living son of the Prince of Wales was also entitled to the style, but not younger sons or daughters of the eldest living son of the Prince of Wales. Queen Elizabeth II changed this in 2012 prior to the birth of Prince George so that all children of the eldest living son of the Prince of Wales would bear the style, returning to the position Queen Victoria had instituted in 1898. On 18 January 2020, Queen Elizabeth II announced that Harry and Meghan, the Duke and Duchess of Sussex, would no longer use the style of His/Her Royal Highness due to their decision to step down as working members of the royal family, though they are still legally entitled to the style. On 13 January 2022, it was announced that the then Prince Andrew, Duke of York would no longer use the style, following a lawsuit against him. On 30 October 2025, Buckingham Palace announced that King Charles III had started a "formal process" to remove Andrew's style, titles, and honours; as part of this process, he issued letters patent on 3 November that formally removed the style from Andrew.

Letters patent dated 21 August 1996 stated that the wife of a member of the royal family loses the right to the style of HRH in the event of their divorce.

== See also ==
- British prince and British princess
- Forms of address in the United Kingdom
- Royal and noble styles
- Table of Ranks (Russian)
