= Abdul Malik (sergeant) =

Ghanaian military personnel

Sergeant Abdul Malik was a Ghanaian soldier. He led a military coup d'etat with Lance Corporal Halidu Giwa on June 19, 1983.

== The coup ==
Though the coup attempt failed, lives were changed from that day. One of the casualties of that day was Boakye Agyarko who was shot and left at the 37 Military Hospital for dead. He survived and became a Vice President of the Bank of New York.
