= Grace Asamoah Agyemang =

Ghanaian politician

Municipal Chief Executive of Atwima Kwanwoma Municipal
- Incumbent
- Assumed office 16 May 2025
- Appointed by: President of Ghana

Personal details
- Born: Ghana
- Party: National Democratic Congress
- Profession: Auditor
- Known for: First female Municipal Chief Executive of Atwima Kwanwoma Municipal

Grace Asamoah Agyemang is a public servant and politician from Ghana. She currently serves as the Municipal Chief Executive (MCE) for the Atwima Kwanwoma District in the Ashanti Region. On May 16, 2025, she made history by becoming the first woman to be confirmed for the role since the district assembly started. Before joining politics, she worked as a public servant, serving as the Chief Internal Auditor for the Ghana Education Service (GES).

== Early life and career ==
Before joining local government, Agyemang had a rich background in auditing and public administration. She worked as the Chief Internal Auditor for the Ghana Education Service (GES). As the Chief Internal Auditor, she checked financial rules and internal control for one of the biggest public institutions in Ghana.

Hon Grace contested for member of parliament for the 2020 and 2024 general elections on the ticket of the NDC, gaining the best tally of votes by any NDC candidate in Atwima Kwanwoma for both presidential and parliamentary elections.

Agyemang entered local government politics through the National Democratic Congress (NDC). Before being appointed, Agyemang had spoken in defense of the party's "resetting agenda." She had also held various positions in the constituency's political network.

Hon Grace is a Christian and is married with 4 children namely; Nana Serwaah, Enkay, Nana Bonsu and Nana Amma.
