= Lydia Alhassan =

Ghanaian politician

Hon. Lydia Seyram Alhassan
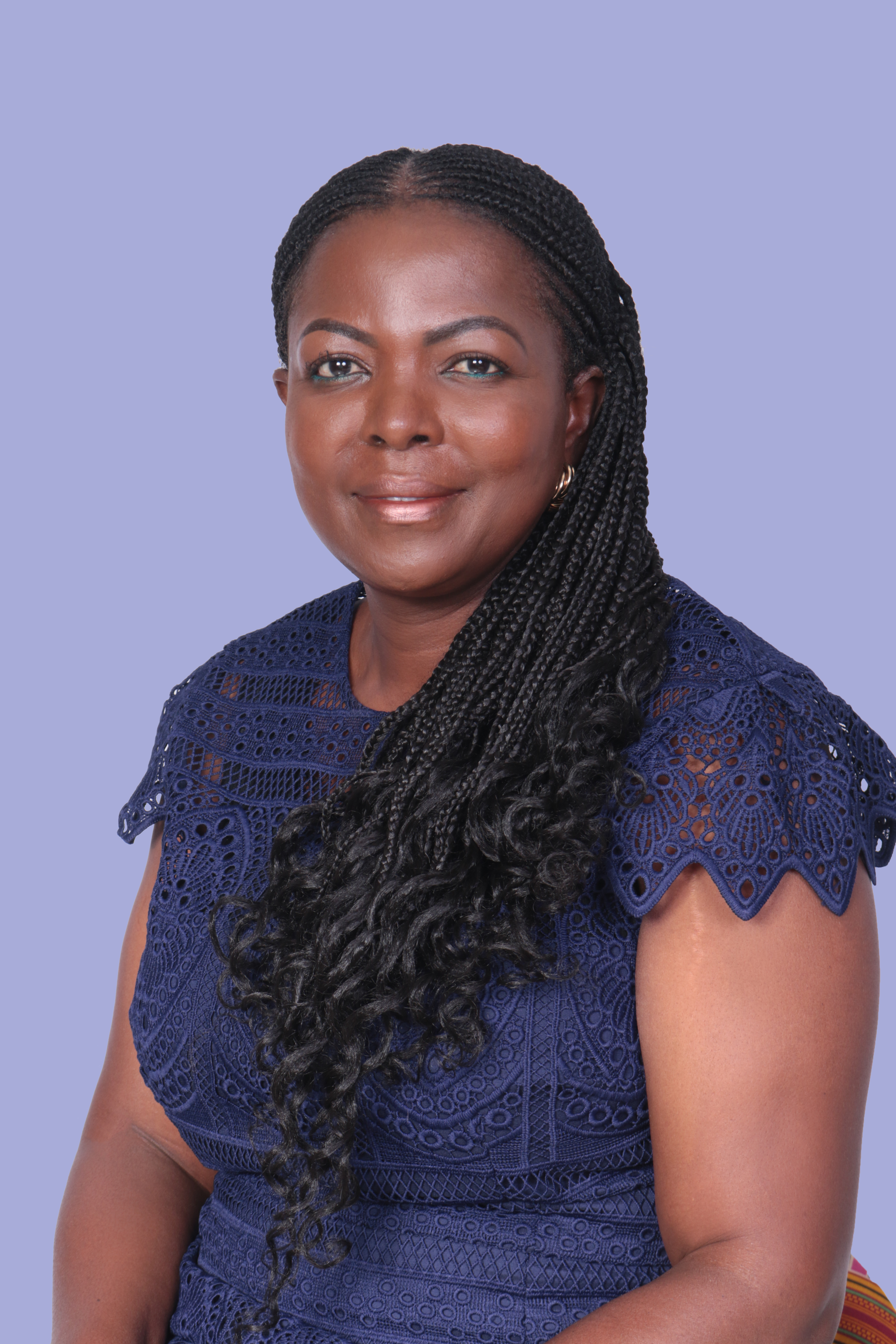

Member of Parliament for Ayawaso West Wuogon Constituency
- In office 7 January 2021 – 7 January 2025

Personal details
- Born: Lydia Seyram Alhassan; 31 January 1970 (age 56) Atiavi
- Party: New Patriotic Party
- Committees: Health Committee, Mines and Energy Committee, Business Committee, Committee of Selection Committee

Lydia Seyram Alhassan (born 31 January 1970) is a Ghanaian politician and member of the Seventh Parliament of the Fourth Republic of Ghana. She represented the Ayawaso West Wuogon Constituency in the Greater Accra Region on the ticket of the New Patriotic Party.

== Education ==
She holds an MBA in Marketing from the University of Ghana Business School and a Bachelor of Administration degree from the Ghana Institute of Management and Public Administration (GIMPA).

== Politics ==
In January 2019, Lydia contested the parliamentary seat for the Ayawaso West Wuogon Constituency. She contested on the ticket of the New Patriotic Party (NPP), and succeeded her late husband Emmanuel Boakye Agyarko. She won the election with 68.80 per cent of the valid votes cast. The other candidates, Kwasi Delali Brempong of the opposition National Democratic Congress (NDC) polled 30.52 per cent, William Kofi Dowokpor of the Progressive People's Party (PPP) polled 0.58 per cent, and Clement Boadi of the Liberal Party of Ghana (LPG) polled 0.10 per cent.

She successfully contested in the 2020 Ghanaian general election under the ticket of New Patriotic Party and won against Ghanaian celebrity and NDC candidate John Dumelo, polling 9,851 of the valid votes cast. The most recent honors that Hon. Lydia Alhassan has received for her services to the country's development are the Ghana Parma Awards' Woman of Excellence Award from 2017 and Personality of the Year Award from 2021.

In the 2024 Ghanaian general elections, Lydia was defeated by John Dumelo with Dumelo polling 47,560 votes with her securing 39,214 votes.

== Personal life ==
She was married to the late politician Emmanuel Boakye Agyarko until his death in 2018.
