= Halidu Giwa =

Ghanaian coup organizer

Carlos Halidu Giwa was a lance corporal in the Ghana Army. He led a military coup d'etat with Sergeant Abdul Malik on June 19, 1983.

== The coup ==
Though the coup attempt failed, lives were changed from that day. One of the casualties of that day was Boakye Agyarko who was shot and left at the 37 Military Hospital for dead. He survived and became a Vice President of the Bank of New York.
