= Ife Bell Tipaɣya =

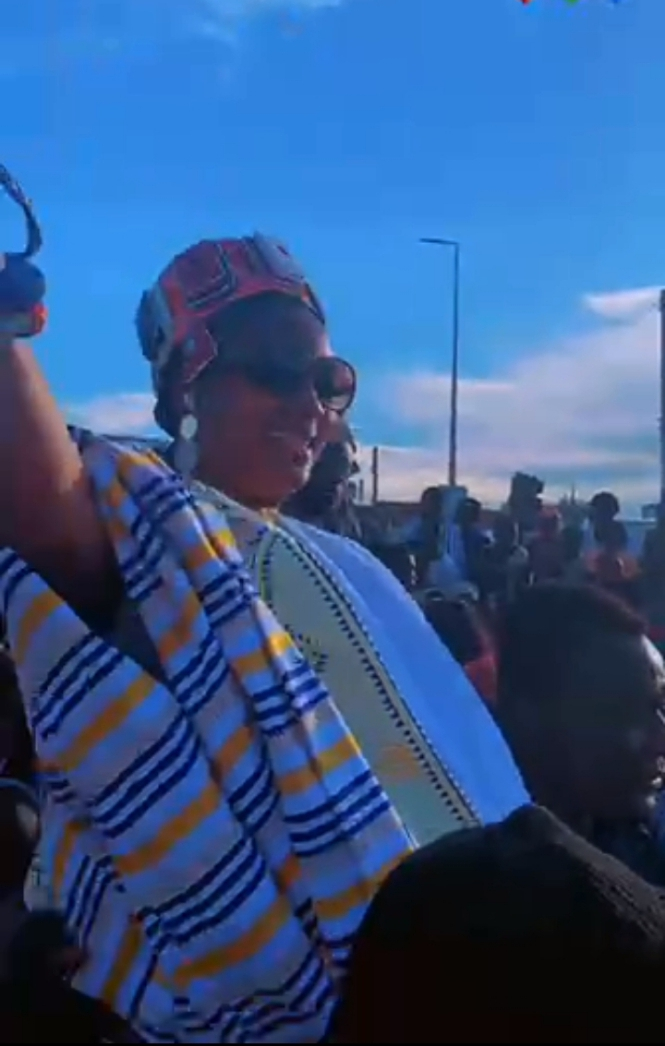
- Education: University of Cincinnati; Northern Kentucky University
- Title: Zosimli Naa
- Predecessor: Susan J. Herlin
- Website: www.zosimlinaa.net

HRH Ife Bell Tipaɣya is the current Zosimli Naa of the Gulkpegu Naa’s Palace in the Kingdom of Dagbon. She was enskinned (installed as leader) on Monday, Jul 5, 2021. She succeeds HRH Dr. Susan J. Herlin, who held the position from 1995 to 2014. She is an expert in leadership and a thought leader.

== Projects ==
1. US$400,000 Medical Supplies to Ghana
