= Susan J. Herlin =

Zosimli Naa Susan Jean Herlin
- Born: May 26, 1939; Port Arthur, Texas
- Died: May 21, 2014; Louisville, Kentucky
- Education: Trinity University, Boston University
- Occupation: Professor
- Title: Zosimli Naa of Kingdom of Dagbon
- Successor: Ife Bell Tipaɣya
- Board member of: Sustainable Foods Alliance
- Spouse(s): Morgan Robert Broadhead (1967-1985), HRH Wyatt MacGaffey (1997-)
- Children: Princes: Morgan Alexander, Jeremy Robert, Matthew Bruce

HRH Dr. Susan J. Herlin was an academic, royalty, and a humanitarian who dedicated herself to the promotion of development of Ghana. She was the first Zosimli Naa of the Kingdom of Dagbon. She was born on May 26, 1939, at Port Arthur, Texas, to Robert and Jean Herlin. She died on May 21, 2014, at Louisville, Kentucky. Herlin was inducted into the Hall of Fame of The University of Louisville's Pan-African Studies Department.

== Education ==
Herlin went to Thomas Jefferson High School from 1954 to 1957. Later, she graduated with a BA in Music History and Performance, from Trinity University, San Antonio, from 1957 to 1961. She went on to Boston University, where she wrote her doctoral dissertation in African History. For nearly three decades, she was a professor at the departments of History and Pan-African Studies at the University of Louisville. She was also an Associate Dean in the university's College of Arts and Sciences from 1993 to 2003.

== Projects ==
=== Zosimli Naa Scholarship ===
Herlin founded the Zosimli Naa Scholarship Program. More than 250 students in high schools and colleges have benefitted from the program since its inception.

== Personal life ==
Herlin was raised Presbyterian, but joined the Episcopal Church after her first marriage.

At the time of her death, she was married to Wyatt MacGaffey; she had three sons from her previous marriage.
