= George Isaac Amoo =

Ghanaian politician

Hon. George Isaac Amoo

Member of Parliament for Ayawaso West-Wuogon Constituency
- In office 7 January 2001 – 6 January 2005
- President: John Kufuor

Personal details
- Party: New Patriotic Party
- Profession: Politician

George Isaac Amoo is a Ghanaian politician who was member of parliament for the Ayawaso West Wuogon Constituency from January 2001 to January 2005. He was the 3rd national coordinator of the National Disaster Management Organization in Ghana.

== NADMO coordinator ==
Amoo was appointed by President John Kufour as the national coordinator of NADMO. He served in that capacity from August 2006 to December 2007.

== GMET ==
Amoo is currently the chairman of an 11-member Governing Board the Ghana Meteorological Agency(GMET) which was inaugurated in Accra on February 22, 2023. At the helm of the board is Mr. George Isaac Amoo, serving as chairman. Assisting him are esteemed members: Mr. Eric Esuman, Mrs. Magdalene Ewuraesi Apenteng, Madam Cecilia Sheitu Nyadia, Mr. Ben Yaw Ampomah, and Ing. Theophilus Nii Okai.

== Politics ==
Amoo is a member of the New Patriotic Party. He was elected as the member of parliament for the Ayawaso West-Wuogon constituency in the Greater Accra region in the 3rd parliament of the 4th republic of Ghana. He was succeeded by Akosua Frema Osei-Opare in the 2004 Ghanaian General elections.

== Elections ==
Amoo was elected as the member of parliament for the Ayawaso West-Wuogon constituency in the 2000 Ghanaian general elections. He was elected on the ticket of the New Patriotic Party. His constituency was a part of the 16 parliamentary seats out of 22 seats won by the New Patriotic Party in that election for the Greater Accra Region. The New Patriotic Party won a majority total of 100 parliamentary seats out of 200 seats in the 3rd parliament of the 4th republic of Ghana. He was elected with 17,555 votes out of 31,648 total valid votes cast. This was equivalent to 56.2% of the total valid votes cast. He was elected over Elvis Afriyie-Ankrah of the National Democratic Congress, Jane Chinebuah of the National Reform Party and Samuel Addy of the People's National Convention. These obtained 11,338, 1, 077, 715, and 477 votes respectively out of the total valid votes cast. These were equivalent to 36.5%, 3.5%, 2.3% and 1.5% respectively of total valid votes cast.
