= Kojo Appiah-Kubi =

Ghanaian politician

Hon. Kojo Appiah-Kubi
- Constituency: Atwima Kwanwoma

Member of Parliament
- In office 7 January 2009 – 6 January 2013
- President: John Atta Mills
- Preceded by: Dr. Matthew Kwaku Antwi

Personal details
- Born: 15 July 1956 (age 69)
- Party: New Patriotic Party
- Children: 5
- Occupation: Economist/Management Consultant

Kojo Appiah-Kubi (born 15 June 1956) is a Ghanaian politician and member of the Seventh Parliament of the Fourth Republic of Ghana representing the Atwima Kwawoma Constituency in the Ashanti Region on the ticket of the New Patriotic Party.

== Early life and education ==
Appiah-Kubi was born on 15 June 1956 and hails from Atwima Twedie in the Ashanti region of Ghana. He obtained his PhD degree from University of Mainz, Germany in 1994 where he studied Business Administration and Economics.

== Career ==
Appiah-Kubi joined the Parliament of Ghana in 2009 as the New Patriotic Party candidate representing Atwima Kwawoma Constituency. He is an Economist/Management Consultant. He was the Director of Policy Planning and Development at the National Development Planning Commission (NDPC) in Accra.

== Politics ==
Appiah-Kubi represented the Atwima Kwanwoma constituency as the Member of Parliament in the 5th parliament of the 4th republic of Ghana. He was elected on the ticket of the New Patriotic Party in the 2008 Ghanaian general elections. He obtained 32,367votes of 39,660 total valid votes cast, equivalent to 81.61% of total valid votes cast. He won against Nana Kwadwo Appiah of the National Democratic Congress and Acquah Evans Fordjour of the Reformed Patriotic Democrats. These obtained 14.93% and 3.46% respectively of total valid votes cast.

== Personal life ==
He is married with five children. He is a Christian who follows the Catholic doctrine.
