= The Statesman Newspaper =

Ghanaian newspaper

The Statesman Newspaper is a Ghanaian newspaper printed weekly in Ghana by the Graphic Communications Group. It is the oldest mainstream newspaper in Ghana. It has been in circulation since 1949.

== Past contributors ==
- Boakye Agyarko – weekly column titled Letters from America
