= Poku Adu-Gyamfi =

Ghanaian politician

Poku Adu Gyamfi

MP for Bosomtwe
- In office 7 January 1997 – 6 January 2005
- President: John Agyekum Kufour

Personal details
- Born: Bosomtwe District, Ashanti Region
- Party: New Patriotic Party
- Education: University of Hohenheim
- Occupation: Politician

Poku Adu Gyamfi is a Ghanaian Politician and a member of the Third Parliament of the Fourth Republic Republic representing the Bosomtwe Constituency in the Ashanti Region of Ghana.

== Early life and education ==
Adu was born Bosomtwe, a town in the Ashanti Region of Ghana. He attended the University of Hohenhem and also the Institute of Agricultural Sciences in Tropics (Hans-Ruthenberg-Institute).

== Politics ==
Adu was first elected into Parliament on the ticket of the New Patriotic Party during the December 1996 Ghanaian General Elections. He polled 11,606 votes out of the 22,537 valid votes cast representing 34.60% against Joseph Oteng-Adjei and NDC member who polled 7,339 votes, Bernard Kwabena Asamoah a CPP member who polled 3,389 votes and Joseph Appiah a PNC member who polled 203 votes. In the 2000 Ghanaian General Elections for the Bosomtwe Constituency in the Ashanti Region of Ghana, he polled 15,160 votes out of the 22,85 valid votes cast representing 63.30% against Joseph O. Adjei an NDC member who polled 7,361 votes representing 32.20%, Suleiman Mohammed a PNC member who polled 225 votes representing 1.00% and Violet Kankam a CPP member who polled 129 votes representing 0.60%. He was defeated by Simon Osei Mensah in the 2004 NPP parliamentary primaries.

== Career ==
He was a member of Parliament from 1997 to 2005 for the Bosomtwe Constituency in the Ashanti Region of Ghana.
