= Chris Benjamin (journalist) =

Canadian journalist

- Born: May 26, 1975 (age 51)
- Other name: Christopher Benjamin
- Occupations: journalist, novelist and non-fiction writer

Christopher Benjamin (born May 26, 1975) is a Canadian journalist, novelist and non-fiction writer.

== Education ==
Benjamin completed a Bachelor of Commerce from Dalhousie University (Halifax, Nova Scotia, Canada) in 1997 and a Master of Environmental studies (MES) from York University (Toronto, Ontario, Canada) in 2001. During his MES, Benjamin completed a six-month term in Makassar, Indonesia and subsequently published "Sharing Environmental Information in Makassar" in the anthology From Sky to Sea, published by the University of Waterloo Press in 2005.

== Influences ==
Much of Benjamin's writing has been influenced by his work and travel in the Caribbean, West Africa, East and Central Asia and Europe. From 2006 to 2007, Benjamin worked as a Development Correspondent at The Statesman, a daily national newspaper in Accra, Ghana.

== Personal ==
Benjamin currently lives in Halifax, Nova Scotia, with his wife and two children.

== Works ==
=== Non-fiction ===
- Eco-Innovators: Sustainability in Atlantic Canada (Nimbus, 2011; ISBN 1551098636) – Winner of the 2012 APMA Best Atlantic-Published Book Award; Finalist for the 2012 Evelyn Richardson Non-Fiction Award; listed in the Top 5 Atlantic Canadian books of 2011 by Arts East Magazine.
- The Shubenacadie Indian Residential School (Nimbus, 2014; ISBN TBD) – Winner of the 2013 Dave Greber Freelance Writer Award in the book category

=== Fiction ===
Drive-By Saviours (Roseway, 2010; ISBN 9781552663691) – Winner of the 2008 Percy Prize – Top Novel in the Atlantic Writing Competition; Long-listed for a 2011 ReLit Award; Long-listed for CBC Canada Reads 2011; selected to Salty Ink's top-notch books of 2010 list

=== Journalism ===
Since 2012, Chris Benjamin has been a columnist and regular contributor to Halifax Magazine. He was a regular contributor to Openfile Halifax until it went on hiatus in 2012. Since 2008, Benjamin has been a regular contributor and Sustainable City columnist with The Coast Magazine in Halifax, Nova Scotia. From 2006–2007, Benjamin worked as a Development Correspondent with The Statesman, a daily newspaper in Ghana. Benjamin has also published widely in other regional and national publications, including:

- "Clinical Culture Clash: The IWK's midwifery program was sabotaged by the hospital's own administration, say women who left", published by The Halifax Chronicle Herald, Sun, February 6, 2011
- "Rebuilding Halifax's Most Feared Neighbourhood", published by The Globe and Mail, September 25, 2010
- "The myth of the wealthy environmentalist" in Briarpatch Magazine, July/August 2009 – Honourable Mention 2009 National Magazine Awards
- "Retooling Schooling" in Briarpatch Magazine, September 2009
- "The destable solution: Prison reform in Ghana" in Briarpatch Magazine, May 2009
- "Incubating Ideas: Fernwood celebrates 20 years of radical publishing" in Briarpatch Magazine, July 2012
- "Midwifery is ready for delivery, but mainstream public health lags", published by This Magazine, February Issue, 2010
- "Imagine Fewer Schools", published by the Nova Scotia Policy Review, Cover Story, June 2008
- "Who Are the Real Crazies Here?", published by Now Magazine, News, April 14, 2005

Anthologies

- "The water bottle thief" in Everything is Political (Fernwood, 2013; ISBN 9781552665497).
- "Let us reinvent the wheel" in Year One Anthology (Open Heart Forgery, 2011; ISBN 9780986846106)
- "Bill on a Code of Ethic for the Province" in Year One Anthology (Open Heart Forgery, 2011; ISBN 9780986846106)
- "The Law Won" in Descant 150: Writers in Prison (Issue 150, Vol. 41, No. 3, Fall 2010)
- "The Futurology of Fatherhood" in Nova Scotia: Visions of the Future Anthology (Pottersfield Press, July 2009; ISBN 9781897426074)
- "Sharing Environmental Information in Makassar" in From Sky to Sea: Environment and Development in Indonesia (S.K. Wismer, T. Babcock, and B. Nurkin (Eds). Waterloo, Ontario, University of Waterloo, Department of Geography Publication Series No. 61.)

Radio

- "The Forest and the Trees", CBC Radio One, Maritime Magazine, aired Sunday, January 20, 2013
