= Twedie =

Trede
- District Capital
- Location in Ghana
- Coordinates: 6.659896°N 1.723764°W
- Country: Ghana
- Region: Ashanti Region
- District: Atwima Kwanwoma District
- Capital: Trede
- Elevation: 318 ft (97 m)

Trede is a town in the Ashanti Region of Ghana. It's located 16 km west of Kumasi, the Ashanti Regional capital. Trede is the district capital of the Atwima Kwanwoma District.

== History ==
Twedie is under the traditional authority of the Asantehene. In 2007, this town was named by the legislative instrument (L.I) 1853 as the capital of the then newly created Atwima Kwanwoma District. However, fierce resistance from a rival community, Trede made the government backtrack on its earlier decision and rather named a compromise community, Atwima Foase as the District capital.

The Chiefs and people of Twedie became aggrieved and sent the matter to the supreme Court of Ghana for redress. The matter travelled for five years and in May 2012, the Supreme court of Ghana quashed the Parliament's decision and restored Twedie as the capital of the Atwima Kwanwoma District. In 2017, the government decided to carry out the supreme Court's decision of May 2012 to relocate the administrative capital from Atwima Foase to Twedie.

A new Legislative Instrument (L.I.) 2253 therefore came into force in July 2017 by changing the District Administrative Capital from Atwima Foase to Twedie. This angered the Chiefs and residents of Atwima Foase which sparked of fierce agitations leading to the death of four (4) and several others sustaining various degrees of injuries.

== Economy ==
Twedie has basically an agrarian economy with agricultural activities very high, with farming being the most important productive activity with respect to output, income and employment. About 62.6 percent of the working population is estimated to be engaged in agriculture. However, small holder farmers who use traditional methods dominate these activities.

Twedie lies in the forest zone and has vast track of arable land and favourable rainfall patterns. The major crops produced include maize, cassava, vegetables, yam and plantain and tree crops (citrus, cocoa, oil palm). Tree crops are grown mainly for commercial purposes. Farmers in the area enjoy ready market for their produce because of its proximity to Kumasi.
