= Ayawaso West =

Ghana parliament constituency

Ayawaso West Wuogon
- constituency for the Parliament of Ghana
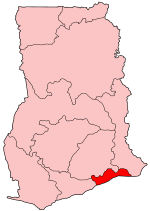
- District: Accra Metropolitan Area
- Region: Greater Accra Region of Ghana

Current constituency
- Party: National Democratic Congress
- MP: John Dumelo

Ayawaso West or Ayawaso West Wuogon is one of the constituencies in Accra represented in the Parliament of Ghana. It elects one Member of Parliament (MP) by the first past the post system of election. Ayawaso West is located in the Accra Metropolitan Area of the Greater Accra Region of Ghana. The current member of parliament for the constituency is John Dumelo.

== Members of Parliament ==
First elected	Member	Party	President
1992	Kenneth Dzirasah (First Deputy Speaker)	National Democratic Congress	Jerry Rawlings
1996	Mrs. Rebecca Akweley Adotey	National Democratic Congress	Jerry Rawlings
2000	George Isaac Amoo	New Patriotic Party	John Kufuor
2004	Akosua Frema Osei-Opare	New Patriotic Party	John Kufuor
2012	Emmanuel Kwabena Kyeremateng Agyarko	New Patriotic Party	John Atta Mills
2019	Lydia Alhassan	New Patriotic Party	Nana Akufo-Addo
2020	Lydia Alhassan	New Patriotic Party	Nana Akufo-Addo
2024	John Dumelo	National Democratic Congress (Ghana)	John Mahama

== Elections ==
2020 Ghanaian Election:Ayawaso West Source:
Party	Candidate	Votes	%	±%
New Patriotic Party	Lydia Seyram Alhassan	39,851	51.4	—
National Democratic Congress	John Dumelo	37,478	48.3	—
People's National Convention	Gifty Botchway	160	0.2	—
Majority		2,373	3.1	—
Turnout				—

Following the death of her husband, Lydia Alhassan stood for and won the by-election for his seat.

2019 By-election:Ayawaso West Source: GhanaWeb
Party	Candidate	Votes	%	±%
New Patriotic Party	Lydia Seyram Alhassan	12,041	68.80	—
National Democratic Congress	Kwasi Delali Brempong	5,341	30.52	—
Progressive People's Party	William Kofi Dowokpor	102	0.58	—
Liberal Party of Ghana	Clement Boadi	17	0.1	—
Majority		6,700	38.28	—
Turnout		17, 589	19.83	—

MPs elected in the Ghanaian parliamentary election, 2008:Ayawaso West Source: Ghana Home Page
Party	Candidate	Votes	%	±%
New Patriotic Party	Akosua Frema Osei-Opare	24,603	43.2	—
National Democratic Congress	Albert Kwadwo Twum Boafo	21,564	37.8	—
Convention People's Party	William Kofi Dowokpor	7,910	13.9	—
Independent	Samuel Kobby Adiepena	2,547	4.5	—
People's National Convention	Henry Haruna Asante	374	0.7	—
Majority		3,039	5.4	—
Turnout		—	—	—

== The Assembly ==
On the 15th of March, 2018, the Ayawaso West Municipal Assembly (AWMA) was established as a distinct entity, separated from the Accra Metropolitan Assembly (AMA), through the enactment of Legislative Instrument (LI) 2312. Its administrative center is located in Dzorwulu. The inaugural plan for the assembly is the 2018-2021 Medium Term Development Plan, which will lay the foundation for the Municipality's socio-economic advancement. Covering an area of 385 square kilometers, the Ayawaso West Municipal Assembly (AWMA) encompasses approximately 3.0% of the total land area of the Greater Accra Region.

The Ayawaso West Municipality stands as a contemporary and cosmopolitan region, boasting a rich tapestry of individuals from various socio-cultural backgrounds. The local populace primarily consists of Ga people who observe the Homowo Festival, while the area also accommodates Ga-Dangme, Akan with Northern heritage, Ewe, Nigerian, and other ethnic groups who either reside or work within its boundaries. Additionally, the municipality is host to an array of expatriates from around the globe, engaged in both living and working capacities. The prevalent languages spoken encompass Twi, Ga, Ewe, and a spectrum of other dialects.

Leading the administrative affairs is Mr. Bernard Kwesi Pari Sakyiama, serving as the present Municipal Coordinating Director for the assembly.

The Chief Municipal Executive, MCE, Hon. Sandra Owusu Ahinkorah has assured the people of Ayawaso West Municipality that the government would establish a senior high school in the area to enable them benefit from the free SHS program. She made this announcement at the 62nd Independence Day in Accra.

== Projects ==
- Construction of 3, 2 Unit school feeding kitchens - This is an ongoing project within the assembly that started on 18/09/2019. Beneficiary Communities includes Legon Staff Village School, Mamobi Prisons School, Abelenkpe Primary 1 Basic School.
- Construction of 6-unit classroom block with ancillary facilities - This project started in 17/09/2019 and is currently ongoing. Beneficiary Communities includes Abelenkpe.
- PARTIAL RECONSTRUCTION OF LOCAL ROADS - The project is currently underway in certain sections of the assembly, while sealing on the Westland By-Pass Link has been finished in other areas. The Westland community is among the beneficiaries of this initiative.

== See also ==
- List of Ghana Parliament constituencies
