= Ashtown, Ghana =

Suburb of Kumasi, Ghana

Ashanti New Town, commonly known as Ashtown, is a suburb of Kumasi in the Ashanti Region of Ghana. The town featured prominently in Ghanaian news in 2012, when two people were fatally shot by unknown assailants.
