= 2019 Ayawaso West by-election =

Election in Ghana

- 31 January 2019
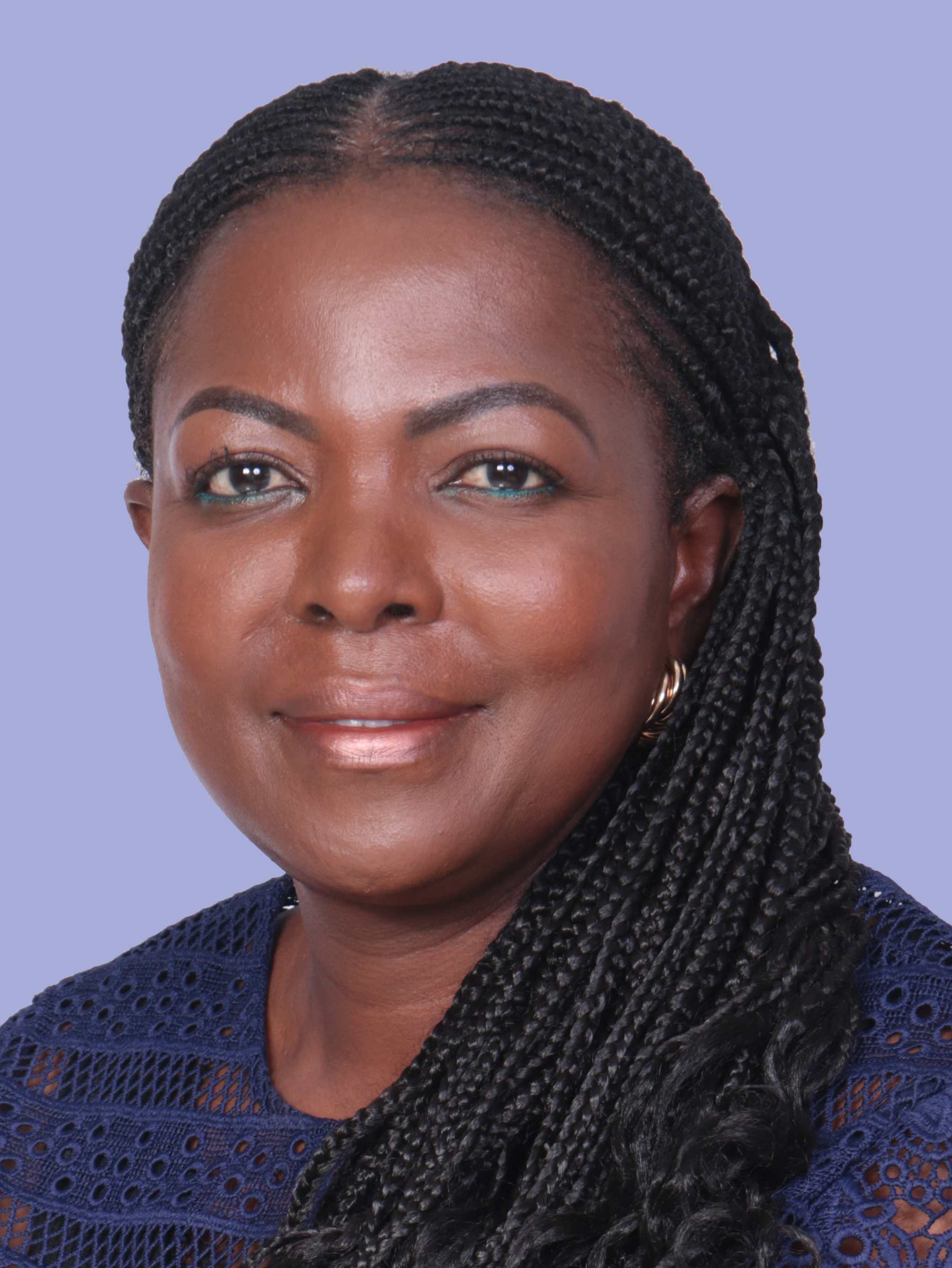
	First party	Second party
		NDC
Candidate	Lydia Alhassan	Delali Brempong
Party	NPP	NDC
Popular vote	12,041	5,341
Percentage	68.80%	30.52%
MP before election
Emmanuel Kwabena Kyeremateng Agyarko
NPP
Elected MP
Lydia Alhassan
NPP

The Ayawaso West by-election took place on 31 January 2019 after the death of the incumbent MP Emmanuel Kyeremateng Agyarko on 21 November 2018. Lydia Alhassan of the New Patriotic Party was elected with 69% of the vote.

== Violence ==
Violence erupted in the area of the La-Bawaleshie polling station two hours after the election had started, though there was no death recorded there were casualties. Ningo-Prampram MP Sam George was assaulted and 18 people were wounded by gunshot. According to YEN.com, the perpetrators were masked men and alleged to be National Security Operatives.

== Result ==
Candidate	Party	Votes	%
Lydia Alhassan	New Patriotic Party	12,041	68.80
Delali Brempong	National Democratic Congress	5,341	30.52
William Doworkpor	Progressive People's Party	102	0.58
Clement Boadi	Liberal Party of Ghana	17	0.10
Invalid/blank voted		88	–
Total		17,859	100
Registered voters/turnout		88,710	19.83
Source: Joy Online

== Commission ==
In February 2020, a 3-member commission was established by the GoG to investigate the violence during the by-election. It was claimed to be set-up by Mahamudu Bawumia with the permission of Nana Akufo-Addo.

== See also ==
- Ejura Shooting
