= Kuntanase =

- District Capital
- Location in Ghana
- Coordinates: 6°32′0.89″N 1°28′26.03″W
- Country: Ghana
- Region: Ashanti Region
- District: Bosomtwe District
- Elevation: 233 ft (71 m)

Kuntanase is a small town and is the capital of Bosomtwe, a district in the Ashanti Region of Ghana.
