= Atwima-Kwanwoma (Ghana parliament constituency) =

Constituency in the Ashanti Region of Ghana

- constituency for the Parliament of Ghana
- District: Botsomtwe/Atwima/Kwanhuma District
- Region: Ashanti Region of Ghana

Current constituency
- Party: New Patriotic Party
- MP: Kofi Amankwa-Manu

Atwima-Kwanwoma is one of the constituencies represented in the Parliament of Ghana. It elects one Member of Parliament (MP) by the first past the post system of election. Atwima-Kwanwoma is located in the Botsomtwe/Atwima/Kwanhuma district of the Ashanti Region of Ghana.

== Boundaries ==
The seat is located within the Botsomtwe/Atwima/Kwanhuma District of the Ashanti Region of Ghana.

== Members of Parliament ==
Election	Member	Party
1992	Sampson Adu Gyamfi	National Democratic Congress
1996	Dr. Matthew Kwaku Antwi	New Patriotic Party
2008	Dr. Kojo Appiah-Kubi	New Patriotic Party
2020	Kofi Amankwa-Manu	New Patriotic Party

== Elections ==
2008 Ghanaian parliamentary election: Atwima-Kwanwoma Source: Ghana Home Page
Party	Candidate	Votes	%	±%
New Patriotic Party	Dr. Kojo Appiah-Kubi	23,367	76.2	—
National Democratic Congress	Nana Kwadwo Appiah	5,922	19.3	—
Reformed Patriotic Democrats	Acquah Evans Fordjour	1,371	4.5	—
Majority		17,445	56.9	—
Turnout				

== See also ==
- List of Ghana Parliament constituencies
