= Lamashegu =

Community in the Northern region of Ghana

Lamashegu is a community (formerly in the Tamale Metropolitan District) currently in the Tamale South Municipality in the Northern Region of Ghana.

== See also ==
- Suburbs of Tamale (Ghana) metropolis
