= National Identification Authority =

Government of Ghana agency

The National Identification Authority is a Government of Ghana agency mandated to officially provide national identity credential to all citizens of Ghana and foreign residence in the country. The authority has the power to do so for both Ghanaians and foreigners. The Authority is headquartered in Accra and headed by Ken Attafuah.

With a population of 30, 8000, 000, NIA has registered 17, 385, 548 citizens, printed 16, 753,909 ID cards and issued 16,111,846 ID cards.

== Responsibilities ==
The authority was set up according Act 707 of parliament to:

To register Ghanaians legally and residents abroad under the National Identification System.

Issue them with National Identity Cards ( Ghana Cards) and control the database.

Build the national data system to collect, analyze, keep, retrieve and disseminate personal data on the population of Ghana ( resident and abroad)
