= Frema Opare =

Ghanaian politician

Hon. Frema Opare

Chief of staff
- In office 7 January 2017 – 6 January 2025
- President: Nana Akufo-Addo
- Preceded by: Julius Debrah
- Succeeded by: Julius Debrah

Member of Parliament for Ayawaso West-Wuogon Constituency
- In office 7 January 2009 – 6 January 2013
- President: John Atta Mills; John Mahama
- Succeeded by: Emmanuel Kyeremateng Agyarko

Member of Parliament for Ayawaso West-Wuogon Constituency
- In office 7 January 2005 – 6 January 2009
- President: John Kufuor
- Preceded by: George Isaac Amoo

Personal details
- Born: 5 June 1947 (age 79)
- Party: New Patriotic Party
- Spouse: Dr. Kwadwo Dua Opare
- Education: University of Guelph, Canada; University of Ghana, Legon
- Profession: Politician, lecturer, consultant

Akosua Frema Osei-Opare (born June 5, 1947) is a development practitioner, academic, economist and Ghanaian politician. She is a member of the New Patriotic Party (NPP). Having spent 40 years in these domains she is an expert in labour and hiring as well as development consulting. She represented Ayawaso West Wuogon Constituency in the Parliament of Ghana. She is a former and first female chief of staff of Ghana, serving from January 7, 2017 to January 6, 2025 under Nana Akufo-Addo.

== Early life and education ==
Frema was born on 5 June 1947. She hails from Wiamoase in the Ashanti Region of Ghana.

She attended St. Monica's Secondary School, Mampong- Ashanti. She had her bachelor's degree in Home Science from the University of Ghana. She proceeded to University of Guelph for a master's degree in Food Science.

== Career ==
Opare lectured at the Department of Home Sciences of the University of Ghana from 1976 to 1982. She eventually became the head of department.

She has worked with the United Nations in the Women in Fisheries project in various capacities in Uganda, Ethiopia, Congo and Namibia.

From 2005 to 2008, Opare worked under the government of President John Agyekum Kufuor as the deputy minister for Manpower, Youth and Employment. Between 2005 and 2013, she served as member of Parliament for Ayawaso West Wuogon.

On July 7, 2023, Valley View University bestowed an honorary doctorate degree upon Opare in recognition of her accomplishments and contributions to the advancement of Ghana. The citation stated, "On the basis of these achievements and contributions that you, your honour, had made to the development of Ghana and the general progress of humanity, Valley View University hereby acknowledges these achievements and hereby confer on you the Degree of Doctor Science (Honours Causa) this day, Friday, July 7, 2023."

On March 3, 2024, at the Jubilee House, Opare threw an exclusive event for representatives of the Black Queens.

== Political career ==
Opare is a leading member of the New Patriotic Party. She served two terms as the member of parliament representing Ayawaso West Wuogon Constituency between 2005 and 2013 under the ticket of the NPP. In 2017, when the NPP was voted in power, she was elected by President Nana Akuffo Addo to serve as the first female chief of staff at the presidency.

=== 2004 elections ===
Opare was elected as the member of parliament for the Ayawaso West-Wuogon constituency in the 2004 Ghanaian General elections. She thus represented the constituency in the 4th parliament of the 4th republic of Ghana. She was elected with 28,636 votes out of 54,988 total valid votes cast, or 52.1%. She was elected over Henry Haruna Asante of the People's National Convention, Samuel Adiepena of the National Democratic Congress and Greenstreet Kobina of the Convention People's Party. They obtained 1.0%, 37.9% and 9.0% of the total valid votes cast, respectively. Opare was elected on the ticket of the New Patriotic Party.

Opare's constituency was one of the 17 constituencies won by the New Patriotic Party in the Greater Accra region in that election. In all, the New Patriotic Party won a total 128 parliamentary seats in the 4th parliament of the 4th republic of Ghana.

== Personal life ==
Opare is married with four children.

She is a Christian.
