= Jachie-Pramso =

- Village
- Location within Ghana
- Coordinates: 6°36′N 1°44′W
- Country: Ghana
- Region: Ashanti Region
- District: Bosomtwe District
- Elevation: 873 ft (266 m)
- Time zone: GMT
  - Summer (DST): GMT

Jachie-Pramso are two separate towns in the Bosomtwe district, a district in the Ashanti Region of Ghana.
