= Atwima Kwanwoma District =

- District
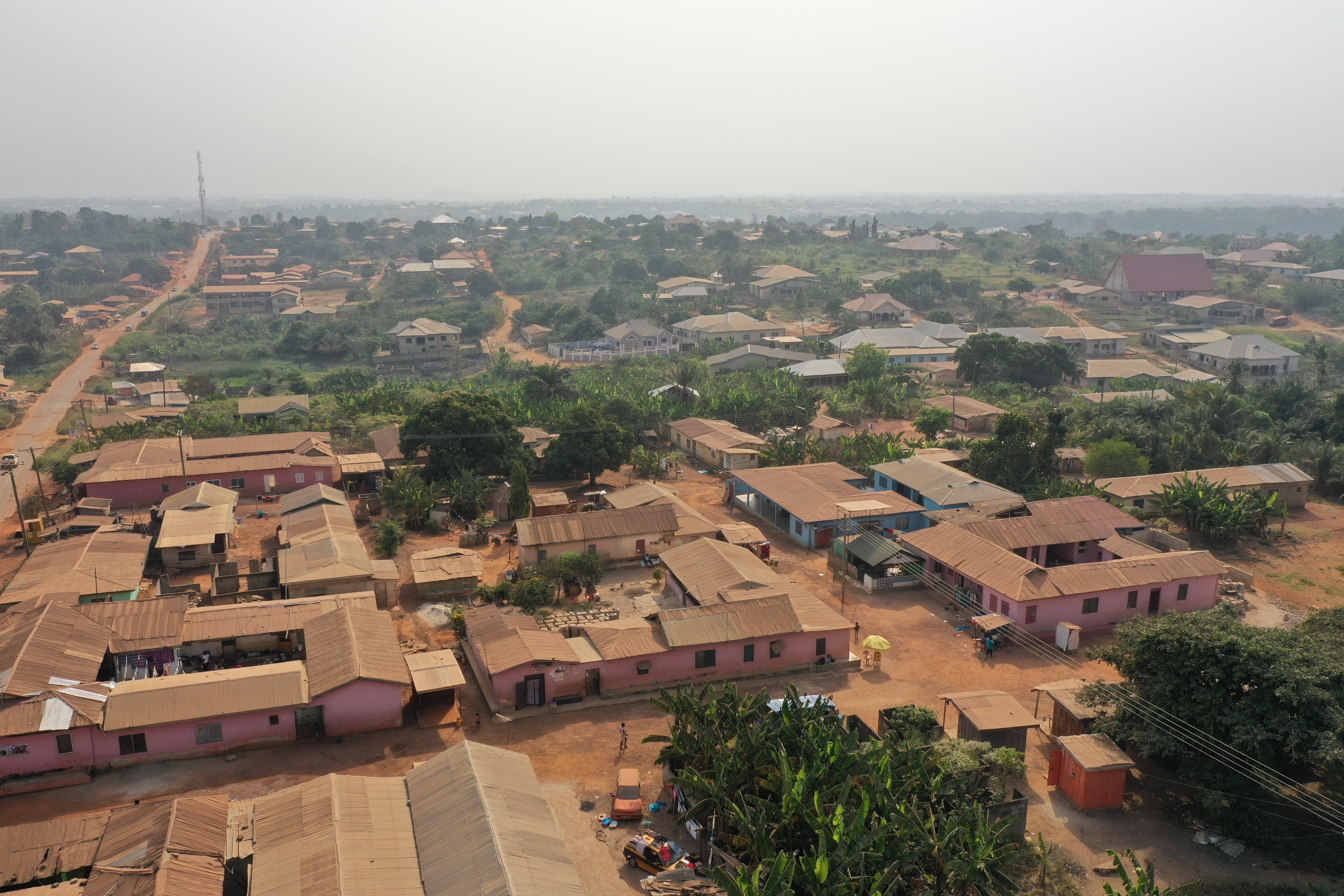

- Districts of Ashanti Region

- Location of Atwima Kwanwoma District within Ashanti
- Coordinates: 6°32′N 1°29′W
- Country: Ghana
- Region: Ashanti
- Capital: Twedie

Government
  - District Executive: Nana Okyere Tawiah Antwi
  - Succeeded: Hon. Emmanuel Kwame Adjei Darkwa

Population (2012)
  - Total: —
- Time zone: UTC+0 (GMT)

Atwima Kwanwoma District is one of the forty-three districts in Ashanti Region, Ghana. Originally it was part of the then-larger Bosomtwe-Atwima-Kwanwoma District which was carved out on 10 March 1989 from the Ejisu-Juaben-Bosomtwe District. In 2007, Atwima-Kwanwoma District was created with Foase as its capital which was later moved to Twedie as a result of a supreme Court ruling.

== Notable people ==
Former Head of State General Ignatious Kutu Akyeampong hailed from the district and is buried in his home town of Hwidiem, a town in the district.

== Education ==
Afia Kobi Girls Senior High School is located at Trabuom. Renamed after the late Asantehemaa Nana Afia Kobi, the school was formerly called Atwimaman Secondary School. It was opened in 1975.

== Sources ==
- "Districts of Ghana". Statoids.
- GhanaDistricts.com
