= Bosomtwe District =

- District
- Districts of Ashanti Region

- Location of Bosomtwe District within Ashanti
- Coordinates: 6°32′N 1°29′W
- Country: Ghana
- Region: Ashanti
- Capital: Kuntanase

Government
  - District Executive: Hon. Lawyer Joseph Kwasi Asuming

Area
  - Total: 718 km^{2} (277 sq mi)

Population (2021 Census)
  - Total: 165,180
  - Density: 230/km^{2} (596/sq mi)
- Time zone: UTC+0 (GMT)

Bosomtwe District is one of the 43 districts in Ashanti Region, Ghana. Originally, it was part of the then-larger Bosomtwe-Atwima-Kwanwoma District on 10 March 1989, which was created from the former Ejisu-Juaben-Bosomtwe District Council, until the western part of the district was split off on 29 February 2008 to create Atwima-Kwanwoma District; the remaining part was renamed Bosomtwe District. The district assembly is located in the central part of Ashanti Region and has Kuntanase as its capital town.

== Tourism ==
Bosomtwe District contains Lake Bosomtwe, one of the largest natural lakes in the world. The lake resort is a popular tourist destination.

== Economy ==
The district also contains minable gold, clay and sand.
