= Mahama government from 2025 =

Government of Ghana 2025 to date

== Mahama's third government ==
This is the second time that John Dramani Mahama has been President of Ghana. His first term in government was when he succeeded the government of President John Atta Mills, who died in office in 2012. Mahama has remained as the flag bearer of the National Democratic Congress since the death of Atta Mills. After winning the 2012 Ghanaian general election, he got to form his own government. He lost the 2016 Ghanaian general election and went into opposition for the following eight years. In the 2024 Ghanaian general election, he beat the New Patriotic Party candidate who was also the incumbent vice president of Ghana, Mahamudu Bawumia to become the president once again.

== Nomination and vetting of ministers ==
Mahama promised to reduce the size of the government in comparison to the outgoing one led by Nana Akufo-Addo and cap the number of ministers at 60. 42 nominees of Mahama were presented to the Appointments Committee of the Parliament of Ghana for vetting. The first two batches of six ministers completed their vetting on 21 January 2025 and were sworn in the next day by Mahama. The next two batches of a further six ministers completed their vetting on 23 January 2025. This included Agnes Naa Momo Lartey, MP for Krowor who missed the swearing in ceremony for personal reasons. This brought to 11 the number of ministers who had been cleared to start work. Following their vetting, a further six ministers and eight regional ministers were sworn in on 30 January by President Mahama. On 7 February 2025, an additional 14 ministers were sworn in bringing the total number of ministers in Mahama's government to 42.

== Two ministers lost in helicopter crash ==
Unfortunately, two ministers were among those who died when the helicopter in which they were travelling to Obuasi from Accra crashed. They were the Defence Minister Edward Omane Boamah and the Environment, Science and Technology Minister, Ibrahim Murtala Muhammed who was also MP for Tamale Central. Following the crash, President Mahama appointed the Finance Minister, Cassiel Ato Forson as acting Defence Minister. Emmanuel Armah Kofi Buah, Minister for Lands and Natural Resources was also asked to act as Minister for Environment, Science, Technology and Innovation.

== August 2026 reeshuffles ==
On 7 August 2026, Mahama moved Kenneth Gilbert Adjei from the Ministry of Works, Housing and Water Resources to head the Ministry of Defence. Ahmed Ibrahim from the Ministry of Local Government, Chieftaincy and Religious Affairs replaces him at the Ministry of Works, Housing and Water Resources. In addition, Zanetor Agyeman-Rawlings, MP for Korle Klottey was nominated for Minister of Environment, Science and Technology while Mahama Ayariga, Parliamentary Majority Leader was also nominated for the Local Government, Chieftaincy and Religious Affairs Ministry. On 26 August 2026, there was a further reshuffle with Abdul-Rashid Pelpuo (MP) moving from Ministry of Labour, Employment and Job Creation to the Ministry for Special Initiatives while Emmanuel Kwadwo-Agyekum (MP) moved in the opposite direction. Both Agyeman-Rawlings and Ayariga were approved by parliament and sworn in by President Mahama on 29 August 2026.

== List of ministers ==
Note: Ministers without a start date have not yet been sworn into office.

For List of Cabinet: Cabinet of Ghana
Office(s)	Officeholder	Start	End
President	John Dramani Mahama	7 January 2025	incumbent
Vice President	Jane Naana Opoku-Agyemang	7 January 2025	incumbent
Sector Ministers
Office(s)	Officeholder	Start	End
Minister for Foreign Affairs	Samuel Okudzeto Ablakwa (MP)	7 February 2025	incumbent
Minister for Finance and Economic Planning	Cassiel Ato Forson (MP)	22 January 2025	incumbent
Minister for the Interior	Mohammed Mubarak Muntaka (MP)	30 January 2025	incumbent
Minister for Defence	Edward Omane Boamah	30 January 2025	6 August 2025
Minister for Defence	Kenneth Gilbert Adjei	7 August 2026	Incumbent
Attorney General and Minister for Justice	Dominic Akuritinga Ayine (MP)	22 January 2025	incumbent
Minister for Education	Haruna Iddrisu (MP)	22 January 2025	incumbent
Minister for Food and Agriculture	Eric Opoku (MP)	22 January 2025	incumbent
Minister for Fisheries and Aquaculture	Emelia Arthur (MP)	25 January 2025	incumbent
Ministry of Trade and Industry	Elizabeth Ofosu-Adjare (MP)	25 January 2025	incumbent
Minister for Health	Kwabena Mintah Akandoh (MP)	7 February 2025	incumbent
Minister for Communications, Digitalisation, and Innovations	Samuel Nartey George (MP)	7 February 2025	incumbent
Minister for Energy	John Abdulai Jinapor (MP)	22 January 2025	incumbent
Minister for Transport	Joseph Bukari Nikpe (MP)	7 February 2025	incumbent
Minister for Roads and Highways	Kwame Governs Agbodza (MP)	22 January 2025	incumbent
Minister for Lands and Natural Resources	Emmanuel Armah Kofi Buah (MP)	30 January 2025	incumbent
Minister for Environment, Science and Technology	Ibrahim Murtala Muhammed (MP)	7 February 2025	6 August 2025
Minister for Environment, Science and Technology	Zanetor Agyeman-Rawlings (MP)	29 August 2026	Incumbent
Minister for Local Government, Chieftaincy and Religious Affairs	Ahmed Ibrahim (MP)	25 January 2025	7 August 2026
Minister for Local Government, Chieftaincy and Religious Affairs	Mahama Ayariga (MP)	29 August 2026	Incumbent
Minister for Tourism, Culture and Creative Arts	Dzifa Gomashie (MP)	25 January 2025	incumbent
Minister for Labour, Jobs and Employment	Abdul-Rashid Pelpuo (MP)	7 February 2025	26 August 2026
Minister for Labour, Jobs and Employment	Emmanuel Kwadwo-Agyekum (MP)	26 August 2026	Incumbent
Minister for Works, Housing and Water Resources	Kenneth Gilbert Adjei	30 January 2025	7 August 2026
Minister for Works, Housing and Water Resources	Ahmed Ibrahim (MP)	7 August 2026	Incumbent
Minister for Youth Development and Empowerment	George Opare Addo	25 January 2025	incumbent
Minister for Sports and Recreation	Kofi Iddie Adams (MP)	7 February 2025	incumbent
Minister for Gender, Children and Social Protection	Agnes Naa Momo Lartey (MP)	30 January 2025	incumbent
Minister of State for Special Initiatives	Emmanuel Kwadwo-Agyekum (MP)	30 January 2025	26 August 2026
Minister of State for Special Initiatives	Abdul-Rashid Pelpuo (MP)	26 August 2026	Incumbent
Minister of State for Government Communications	Felix Kwakye Ofosu (MP)	7 February 2025	incumbent
Minister of State in charge of Climate Change and Sustainability	Issifu Seidu	7 February 2025	incumbent
Minister of State for Public Sector Reforms	Lydia Lamisi Akanvariba (MP)	12 March 2025	incumbent
Regional Ministers
Region	Officeholder	Start	End
Ahafo Regional Minister	Charity Gardiner	7 February 2025	incumbent
Ashanti Regional Minister	Frank Amoakohene	30 January 2025	incumbent
Bono Regional Minister	Joseph Addae Akwaboa	7 February 2025	incumbent
Bono East Regional Minister	Francis Owusu Antwi	7 February 2025	incumbent
Central Regional Minister	Eduamoah Ekow Panyin Okyere	7 February 2025	incumbent
Eastern Regional Minister	Rita Akosua Awatey	30 January 2025	incumbent
Greater Accra Regional Minister	Linda Obenewaa Akweley Ocloo (MP)	30 January 2025	incumbent
Northern Regional Minister	Ali Adolf John	30 January 2025	incumbent
North East Regional Minister	Tia Ibrahim	30 January 2025	incumbent
Oti Regional Minister	John Kwadwo Gyapong	30 January 2025	incumbent
Savannah Regional Minister	Salisu Be-Awuribe Issifu	7 February 2025	incumbent
Upper East Regional Minister	Akamugri Atanga Donatus	30 January 2025	incumbent
Upper West Regional Minister	Puozuing Charles Lwanga	7 February 2025	incumbent
Volta Regional Minister	James Gunu	30 January 2025	incumbent
Western Regional Minister	Joseph Nelson	7 February 2025	incumbent
Western North Regional Minister	Wilbert Petty Brentum	7 February 2025	incumbent

Preceded by Akufo-Addo government (2017 – 2025)	Government of Ghana; 2025 – present	Incumbent
