= Amenu =

Amenu is a Ghanaian surname. Notable people with the surname include:

- D. C. K. Amenu, Ghanaian military officer
- Francis Amenu, Ghanaian engineer

== See also ==
- Amena (disambiguation)
- Ameni (disambiguation)
