= Charles Konadu-Yiadom =

Ghanaian politician (born 1968)

Hon. Charles Konadu-Yiadom

Member of the Ghana Parliament for Nkoranza South Constituency
- In office 7 January 2017 – 6 January 2021
- Preceded by: Emmanuel Kwadwo Agyekum
- Succeeded by: Emmanuel Kwadwo Agyekum

Personal details
- Born: May 24, 1968 (age 58) Nkoranza, Ghana
- Party: New Patriotic Party
- Education: University of Ghana
- Occupation: Politician
- Profession: Banker

Charles Konadu-Yiadom is a Ghanaian politician and member of the Seventh Parliament of the Fourth Republic of Ghana representing the Nkoranza South Constituency in the Bono East Region on the ticket of the New Patriotic Party.

== Early life and education ==
Konadu-Yiadom was born on 24 May 1968 and hails from Nkoranza in the Bono East Region of Ghana. He had his Diploma in Democracy, Governance, Leadership and Development from the University of Ghana.

== Career ==
Konadu-Yiadom was the Director at Brite Life Microfinance.

== Politics ==
Konadu-Yiadom is a member of the New Patriotic Party. He was the Member of Parliament for Nkoranza South Constituency from 2017 to 2021.

=== 2016 elections ===
In the 2016 Ghanaian general elections, he won the parliamentary seat with 22,300 votes making 50.7% of the total votes cast whilst the NDC parliamentary candidate Emmanuel Kwadwo Agyekum had 21,315 votes making 48.5% of the total votes cast, the PPP parliamentary candidate Emmanuel Osei Antwi had 227 votes making 0.5% of the total votes cast, the CPP parliamentary candidate Justice Baah Mathuselah had 100 votes making 0.2% of the total votes cast, the PNC parliamentary candidate Florence Ampour had 25 votes making 0.1% of the total votes cast.

=== 2020 elections ===
In the 2020 Ghanaian general elections, he lost the parliamentary seat to the NDC parliamentary candidate Emmanuel Kwadwo Agyekum. Konadu-Yiadom had 22,219 votes making 43.04% of the total votes cast whilst the NDC parliamentary candidate Emmanuel Kwadwo Agyekum had 29,408 votes making 56.96% of the total votes cast, the PNC parliamentary candidate Florence Ampour had 0 votes making 0% of the total votes cast.

== Personal life ==
Konadu-Yiadom is a Christian.

== Philanthropy ==
In 2018, he provided food to the BECE candidates in his constituency during the exams period. He also donated about 200 desks to the Nkoranza Senior High Technical School.

In 2019, he also donated about GHS 26,000.00 to support the construction of a borehole to the Nkoranza Senior High Technical School.

== Controversy ==
In November 2017, it was alleged Konadu-Yiadom fired gunshot at Diana Attaa Kissiwaa, the then Municipal Chief Executive of Nkoranza on social media. The Ghana Police later denied those allegations.
