= Opare =

Opare is a surname. Notable people with the surname include:

- Daniel Opare (born 1990), Ghanaian footballer
- Frederick Opare-Ansah (born 1968), Ghanaian electrical engineer and politician
- Frema Opare (born 1947), Ghanaian academic, economist and politician, Chief of Staff of Ghana
- George Opare-Addo (born 1981), Ghanaian Lawyer and politician
- Jessica Opare-Saforo (born 1981), Ghanaian media personality
- Kofi Opare (born 1990), Ghanaian footballer
- Kwadwo Opare-Hammond (fl. 2004–2019), Ghanaian politician
- Magnus Opare-Asamoah (born 1948), Ghanaian politician
