= Emmanuel Acheampong =

Ghanaian politician (died 2003)

Hon. Emmanuel Acheampong

Member of Parliament for Gomoa East
- In office 7 January 2001 – 6 January 2005
- Preceded by: Thomas Kweku Aubyn
- Succeeded by: Richard Sam Quarm

Personal details
- Died: 9 February 2003
- Party: New Patriotic Party
- Occupation: Politician

Emmanuel Acheampong (died 9 February 2003) was a Ghanaian politician. He served as a Member of Parliament for the Gomoa East constituency in Central Region of Ghana.

== Political career ==
Emmanuel Acheampong is a member of the 3rd parliament of the 4th republic of Ghana who took his seat during the 2000 Ghanaian general election on the ticket of the New Patriotic Party with a majority of 568 votes. He polled a total of 10,900 votes which represented 47.60% of the total votes cast. His opponents; Richard Annan of the National Democratic Congress (NDC) had 10,332 votes, Michael L.K. Amoah of the Convention People's Party had 792 votes which is 3.50% of the total votes cast. As if these two were not enough, James Kuaw Buafi of the National Reform Party (NRP), Kwame Ebure of the United Ghana Movement (UGM) and Sam Ken Mensah of the People's National Convention (PNC) had 2.20%, 1.00% and 0.00% respectively of the total votes cast. He took the seat from Thomas Kweku Aubyn of National Democratic Congress.

== Personal life and death ==
Acheampong was a Christian. He died on 9 February 2003, together with the Gomoa East NPP chairman Isaac Kofi Yomo Laryea Quarshie in an automobile collision on the Swedru/Winneba road.
