= Minister for Lands and Natural Resources =

The Minister for Lands and Natural Resources is the Minister of the government of Ghana responsible for the Ministry for land administration in the country. The configuration of the Ministry has changed over the years. For most of its existence, it has been known as the Ministry of Lands and Natural Resources. This made it responsible for also formulating policies and administering mining in the country. The Ministry is currently designated as the Ministry of Lands and Natural Resources. Areas covered by the Ministry includes oversight of the Lands Commission, Forestry Commission and the Minerals Commission. It is also responsible for the Office of the Administration of Stool Lands and the Ghana Boundary Commission among others.

== List of Ministers ==
The minister is appointed by the President of Ghana and is assisted by at least one deputy.

Number	Minister	Took office	Left office	Government	Party
Minister for Lands (1st Republic)
1	A. K. Puplampu (MP)	1 February 1965	24 February 1966	Nkrumah government	Convention People's Party
Commissioner for Land and Mineral Resources
2	J. V. L. Phillips	1966	1968	National Liberation Council	Military government
3	R. S. Amegashie	1968	30 September 1969	National Liberation Council	Military government
Minister for Lands, Mineral Resources, Forestry and Wildlife (2nd Republic)
4	R. R. Amponsah (MP)	1969	1971	Busia government	Progress Party
5	T. D. Brodie Mends (MP)	1971	13 January 1972	Busia government	Progress Party
Commissioner for Lands and Mineral Resources
6	Major Kwame Baah	1972	?	National Redemption Council	Military government
7	Major General D. C. K. Amenu	?	9 October 1975	National Redemption Council	Military government
8	Group Captain T. T. Kutin	9 October 1975	?	Supreme Military Council	Military government
9	Brigadier K. Osei-Boateng	?	?	Supreme Military Council	Military government
10	Lt. Col. Abdulai Ibrahim	?	1978	Supreme Military Council	Military government
11	George Benneh	1978	3 June 1979	Supreme Military Council	Military government
11	George Benneh	4 June 1979	24 September 1979	Armed Forces Revolutionary Council	Military government
Minister for Lands and Natural Resources (3rd Republic)
12	E. F. Yeboah Acheampong	1979	31 December 1981	Limann government	People's National Party
Secretary for Lands and Natural Resources
13	Kwesi Renner	1983	1986	Provisional National Defence Council	Military government
14	George Adamu	1986	1987	Provisional National Defence Council	Military government
15	Kwame Peprah	1987	1992	Provisional National Defence Council	Military government
16	J. A. Dansoh	1992	6 January 1993	Provisional National Defence Council	Military government
4th Republic
Minister for Lands and Forestry
17	David Kwasi Amankwah (MP)	1993	1994	Rawlings government	National Democratic Congress
18	Kwabena Adjei (MP)	1994	1997	Rawlings government	National Democratic Congress
19	Christine Amoako-Nuamah	1997	6 January 2001	Rawlings government	National Democratic Congress
Minister for Lands, Mines and Forestry
20	Kwaku Afriyie	8 February 2001	?	Kufuor government	New Patriotic Party
21	Raphael Kasim Kasanga	2002	1 April 2003	Kufuor government	New Patriotic Party
22	Dominic Fobih (MP)	1 April 2003	1 August 2007	Kufuor government	New Patriotic Party
23	Esther Obeng Dapaah (MP)	1 August 2007	6 January 2009	Kufuor government	New Patriotic Party
Minister for Lands and Natural Resources
24	Collins Dauda (MP)	2009	4 January 2011	Mills government	National Democratic Congress
25	Mike Hammah (MP)	4 January 2011	24 July 2012	Mills government	National Democratic Congress
25	Mike Hammah (MP)	24 July 2012	6 January 2013	Mahama government	National Democratic Congress
26	Inusah Fuseini (MP)	30 January 2013	16 July 2014	Mahama government	National Democratic Congress
27	Nii Osah Mills	16 July 2014	6 January 2017	Mahama government	National Democratic Congress
28	John Peter Amewu	2017	2018	Akufo-Addo government	New Patriotic Party
29	Kweku Asomah-Cheremeh	2018	2020	Akufo-Addo government	New Patriotic Party
30	Samuel Abu Jinapor (MP)	2021	6 January 2025	Akufo-Addo government	New Patriotic Party
31	Emmanuel Armah Kofi Buah (MP)	30 January 2025	Incumbent	Mahama government	National Democratic Congress
