= Emmanuel Akwasi Gyamfi =

Ghanaian politician (born 1974)

Hon. Emmanuel Akwasi Gyamfi MP
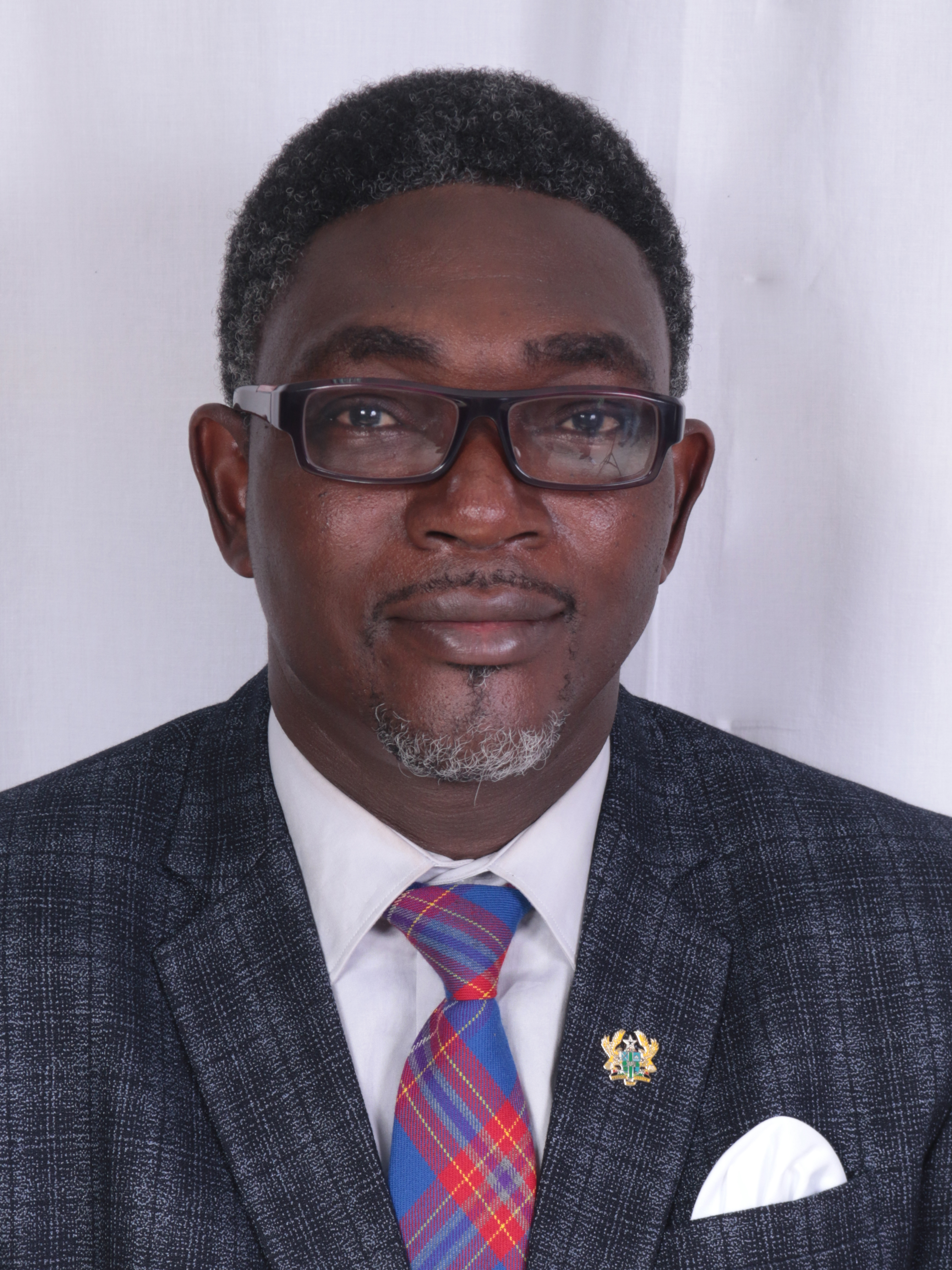

Member of the Ghana Parliament for Odotobri Constituency
- In office 7 January 2005 – 6 January 2025
- Preceded by: Samuel Nkrumah Gyimah
- Succeeded by: Anthony Mmieh

Personal details
- Born: 1 December 1974 (age 51) Homase No. 2
- Party: New Patriotic Party
- Children: 3
- Education: Ghana Institute of Management and Public Administration; Kwame Nkrumah University of Science and Technology
- Profession: Development Planner/ Banker
- Committees: Local Government and Rural Development Committee (Chairperson); Government Assurance Committee; Health Committee

Emmanuel Akwasi Gyamfi is a Ghanaian politician and member of the Seventh Parliament of the Fourth Republic of Ghana representing the Odotobri Constituency in the Ashanti Region on the ticket of the New Patriotic Party.

== Early life and education ==
Gyamfi was born on 1 December 1974. He hails from Homase No. 2 in the Ashanti region of Ghana. He had his Bachelor of Science degree in Planning from the Kwame Nkrumah University of Science and Technology, Kumasi. He obtained the degree in 2000. He is also a product of the Ghana Institute of Management and Public Administration. He obtained an Executive master's degree from the institute. This was in 2008.

== Career ==
Prior to his appointment into parliament, he worked as a project manager at Odotobri Rural Bank Limited. He also worked as an administrator and lead facilitator for a non-governmental organization from 2001 to 2002.

== Political career ==
Gyamfi entered parliament as the Member of parliament elected for the Odotobri Constituency in the 4th parliament of the 4th republic of Ghana. He maintained his seat in the 5th parliament of the 4th republic of Ghana from 7 January 2008 to 6 January 2013. He was elected with 22,914 votes out of the 27,700 valid votes cast equivalent to 82.7% of the total valid votes cast on the ticket of the New Patriotic Party in the 2008 Ghanaian general elections. He was elected again into parliament on 7 January 2013 after the completion of the 2012 Ghanaian General Elections. He was then reelected on 7 January 2017 after the 2016 Ghanaian General Elections where he obtained 66.13% of the valid votes cast. He is a member of the Mines and Energy Committee and the Children and Gender Committee of the 7th Parliament of the 4th Republic of Ghana.

=== Committees ===
Gyamfi is the chairperson of the Local Government and Rural Development Committee, a member of the Government Assurance Committee and also a member of the Health Committee.

== Elections ==
Gyamfi was elected as the member of parliament for the Odotobri constituency of the Ashanti Region of Ghana for the first time in the 2004 Ghanaian general elections. He won on the ticket of the New Patriotic Party. His constituency was a part of the 36 parliamentary seats out of 39 seats won by the New Patriotic Party in that election for the Ashanti Region. The New Patriotic Party won a majority total of 128 parliamentary seats out of 230 seats. He was elected with 23,804 votes out of 28,967 total valid votes cast. This was equivalent to 82.2% of total valid votes cast. He was elected over George Adu-Mensah of the National Democratic Congress, Thomas Appiah-Kubi of the Convention People's Party and Johnny Owusu-Boadi an independent candidate. These obtained 3,740, 423 and 1,000 votes respectively of the total valid votes cast. These were equivalent to 12.9%, 1.5% and 3.5% respectively of total valid votes cast.

=== 2008 General elections ===
In 2008, he won the general elections on the ticket of the New Patriotic Party for the same constituency. His constituency was part of the 34 parliamentary seats out of 39 seats won by the New Patriotic Party in that election for the Ashanti Region. The New Patriotic Party won a minority total of 109 parliamentary seats out of 230 seats. He was elected with 22,914 votes out of 27,700 total valid votes cast. This was equivalent to 82.72% of total valid votes cast. He was elected over Isaac Mensah of the People's National Convention, Kingsley Anning of the National Democratic Congress and Owusu Blessing of the Convention People's Party. These obtained 230, 3,146 and 1,410 votes respectively out of the total valid votes cast. These were equivalent to 0.83%, 11.36% and 5.09% respectively of the total votes cast.

=== 2012 General elections ===
In 2012, he won the general elections once again for the same constituency. He was elected with 27,526 votes out of 35,221 total valid votes cast. This was equivalent to 78.15% of total valid votes cast. He was elected over Robert Bennett Forkuoh of the National Democratic Congress and Kojo Ego Ayeboafo an independent candidate. These obtained 6,226 and 1,469 votes respectively of the total valid votes cast. These were equivalent to 17.68% and 4.17% respectively of the total votes cast.

=== 2016 General elections ===
In 2016, he won the general elections once again for the same constituency. He was elected with 23,255 votes. This was equivalent to 53.87% of total valid votes cast. He was elected over Dede Appiah Emmanuel of the National Democratic Congress, Anthony Danso-Appiah an independent candidate, Abraham Anokye also an independent candidate, Owusu Francis of the PPP and Minkah Prince of the CPP. These obtained 12,098; 4,005; 3,133; 451 and 223 votes respectively of the total valid votes cast. These were equivalent to 28.03%, 9.28%, 7.26%, 1.04% and 0.52% respectively of the total votes cast.

=== 2020 General elections ===
In 2020, he won the general elections once again for the same constituency. He was elected with 28,021 votes. This was equivalent to 57.38% of total valid votes cast. He was elected over Emmanuel Obeng Agyemang of the National Democratic Congress and Paul Agyeman-Bannor of the GUM. These obtained 10,456 and 10,358 votes respectively of the total valid votes cast. These were equivalent to 21.41% and 21.21% respectively of the total votes cast.

== Personal life ==
Gyamfi is married with three children. He is a Christian and Catholic.
