= 1719 in Great Britain =

Events from the year 1719 in Great Britain.

== Incumbents ==
- Monarch – George I

== Events ==
- February – The Royal Academy of Music is founded, establishing a London opera company that commissions new works from Handel, Bononcini and others.
- April – Bank rate set at 5%, at which it will remain for more than a century.
- 13 April – A Jacobite force under George Keith reaches Loch Alsh in the Scottish Highlands and disembarks, launching the Jacobite rising of 1719
- 28 April – A Peerage Bill, proposed by Charles Spencer, 3rd Earl of Sunderland and James Stanhope, 1st Earl Stanhope, to prevent the creation of peers in the House of Lords, is defeated in the House of Commons by the eloquence of Robert Walpole.
- 10 June – British Government forces defeat an alliance of Jacobite and Spanish forces at the Battle of Glen Shiel in Scotland.
- 18 June – Stopping Dagenham Breach by Capt. John Perry is completed.
- 10 October – British expedition under Lord Cobham captures Vigo during the War of the Quadruple Alliance.
- December – 1719 Establishment lays down the technical specifications for construction of warships for the Royal Navy.
- Undated
  - James Figg opens one of the first indoor venues for combat sports, adjoining the City of Oxford tavern in Oxford Road, London.
  - Raine's Foundation School, Bethnal Green (founded by Henry Raine), opens in Wapping; it will survive for 300 years.
  - The South Sea Company proposes a scheme by which it would buy more than half the national debt of Britain in exchange for concessions.

== Publications ==
- 25 April – Daniel Defoe's (anonymous) novel Robinson Crusoe.
- 20 November – John Dennis publishes his play The Invader of His Country following a performance at Drury Lane. Inspired by Shakespeare's Coriolanus, it is intended as a patriotic attack on the Jacobites.
- Eliza Haywood's (anonymous) amatory novel Love in Excess; Or, The Fatal Enquiry, vol. I.
- Isaac Watts's 'Our God, Our Help in Ages Past' published.

== Births ==
- 17 January – Samuel Enderby, whale oil merchant, sponsor of Arctic exploration (died 1797)
- 22 January – Henry Paget, 2nd Earl of Uxbridge (died 1769)
- 23 January – John Landen, mathematician (died 1790)
- 13 February – George Brydges Rodney, 1st Baron Rodney (died 1792)
- 4 March – George Pigot, Baron Pigot, governor of Madras (died 1777)
- 13 March – John Griffin, 4th Baron Howard de Walden, field marshal (died 1797)
- 29 March – John Hawkins, author (died 1789)
- 9 April – Sir Edward Blackett, 4th Baronet, politician (died 1804)
- 30 May – Roger Newdigate, politician (died 1806)
- 23 July – Frances Boscawen, diarist and bluestocking (died 1805)
- 11 August – George Augustus Selwyn, Member of Parliament (died 1791)
- 6 September – Somerset Hamilton Butler, 1st Earl of Carrick (died 1754)
- 21 September – Larcum Kendall, watchmaker (died 1790)
- 4 November – James Cawthorn, poet and schoolmaster (died 1761)

== Deaths ==
- 18 January – Samuel Garth, physician and poet (born 1661)
- 1 March – Richard Ingoldesby, soldier and colonial governor
- 31 May – Edmund Dunch, Whig politician (born 1657)
- 17 June – Joseph Addison, writer and politician (born 1672)
- 23 June – Christopher Wandesford, 2nd Viscount Castlecomer, 2nd Viscount Castlecomer and Member of Parliament (born 1684)
- 17 July – Elinor James, pamphleteer (born 1644)
- 7 September – John Harris, encyclopaedist (born c. 1666)
- 27 September – George Smalridge, Bishop of Bristol (born 1662)
- 22 November – William Talman, architect (born 1650)
- 26 November – John Hudson, classical scholar (born 1662)
- 31 December – John Flamsteed, astronomer (born 1646)
- Benjamin Hornigold, pirate, shipwrecked (born 1680)

== See also ==
- 1719 in Wales
