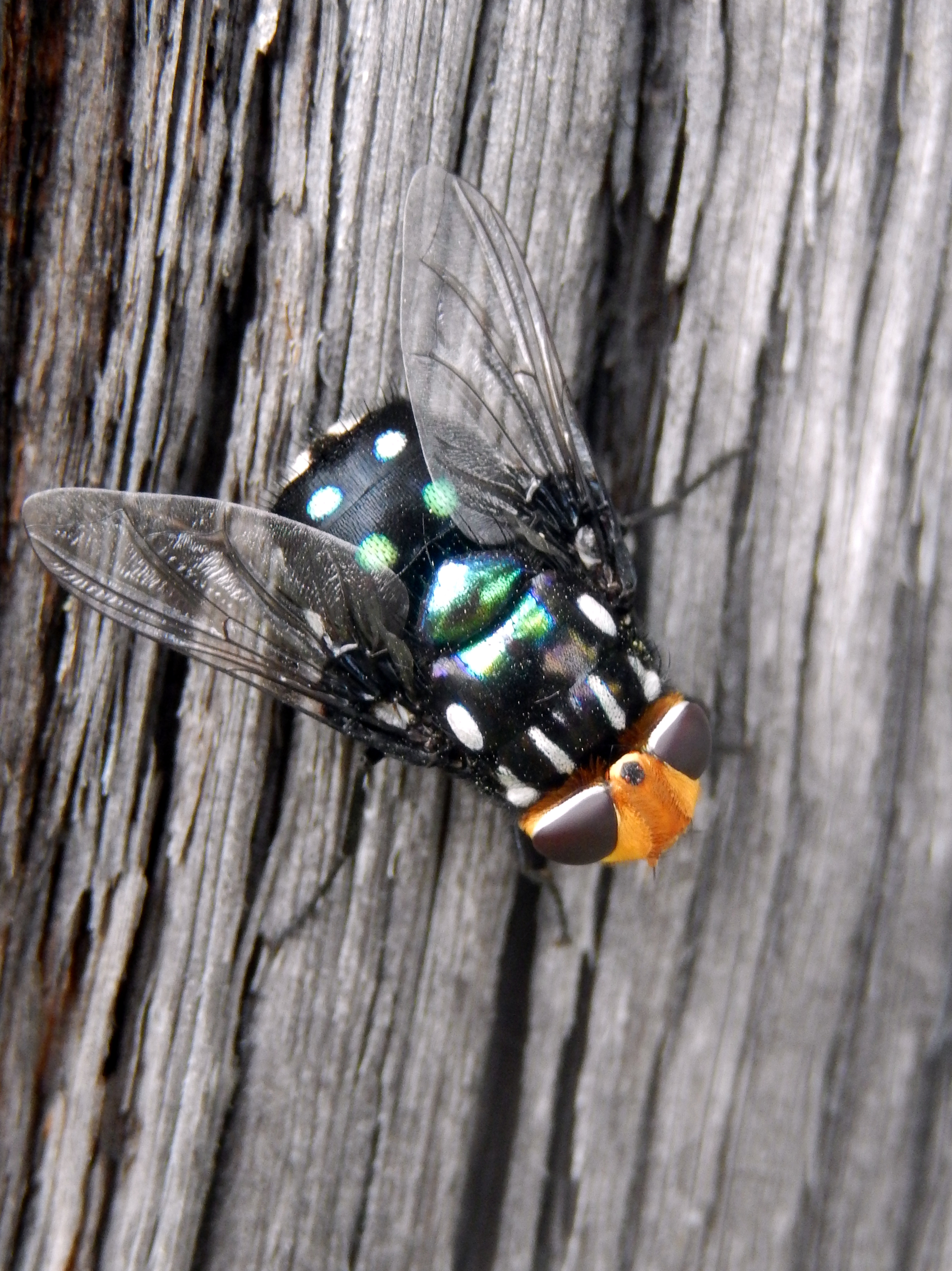

Scientific classification
- Domain: Eukaryota
- Kingdom: Animalia
- Phylum: Arthropoda
- Class: Insecta
- Order: Diptera
- Family: Calliphoridae
- Genus: Amenia
- Species: A. leonina

Binomial name
- Amenia leonina Fabricius, 1775

Synonyms
- Amenia enderleini Paramonov, 1957; Amenia chaetameniina Enderlein, 1936; Amenia stictica Engel, 1925; Ptylostylum albomaculata Macquart, 1851

= Amenia leonina =

Species of fly

Amenia leonina is a blowfly in the family Calliphoridae, found in Australia.
