= Amenia =

Amenia may refer to:

- Amenia, Illinois
- Amenia (town), New York
  - Amenia (NYCRR station), one of two former railway stations serving the New York town of the same name
  - Amenia (CDP), New York, a hamlet within the town
- Amenia, North Dakota
- Amenia Township, North Dakota
- Amenia (wife of Horemheb), ancient Egyptian
- Amenia (fly), a genus of blow-flies

== See also ==
- Armenia
- Amena (disambiguation)
