= J. T. D. Addy =

Ghanaian politician

Ashanti Regional Minister
- In office 1967–1968
- President: Joseph Arthur Ankrah
- Preceded by: D. C. K. Amenu
- Succeeded by: G. K. Yarboi

Western Regional Minister
- In office 1966–1967
- President: Joseph Arthur Ankrah
- Preceded by: Stephen Willie Yeboah
- Succeeded by: Ignatius Kutu Acheampong

Personal details
- Born: John Tetteh Doi Addy; 22 September 1926 Accra, Gold Coast
- Citizenship: Ghana
- Education: Accra Academy

John Tetteh Doi Addy (born 22 September 1926) was a Ghanaian soldier and politician. He was the Chairman of the Western Regional Administrative Committee from 1966 to 1967, and the Chairman for the Ashanti Regional Administrative Committee in 1967.

== Early life and education ==
Addy was born on 22 September 1926 in Accra. He attended Government Boys' School in Accra and proceeded to the Accra Academy for his secondary education from 1942 to 1945. He enrolled at Eaton Hall, U.K. in 1955 and was commissioned on 4 June 1955.

== Career ==
Addy was employed by Société Commerciale de l'Ouest Africain (S.C.O.A.), where he worked for two and a half years at the Head Office in Accra. In July 1949, he enlisted in the Army as an Education Instructor and later became a Sergeant. Addy served with the second and fourth battalions, and also joined the UN Forces in the Congo, during the Congo crisis in 1963. In March 1966, he was appointed Commanding Officer of the first battalion. That same year, he was made Chairman of the Western Regional Administrative Committee (Regional Minister) and on 4 April 1967, he was made Chairman of the Ashanti Regional Administrative Committee, assuming office on 1 May 1967. He was succeeded by G. K. Yarboi.

== Personal life ==
Addy was married to Josephine Adjele Owoo, they had six children. His hobbies included photography and football.
