= Anthony Mmieh =

Ghanaian politician (born 1971)

Hon. Anthony Mmieh MP

Member of the Ghana Parliament for Odotobri
- Incumbent
- Assumed office 7 January 2025
- Preceded by: Emmanuel Akwasi Gyamfi
- President: John Dramani Mahama
- Vice President: Jane Naana Opoku-Agyemang

Personal details
- Born: 13 May 1971 (age 55) Ebunusu, Ashanti Region, Ghana
- Party: New Patriotic Party
- Education: St. Hubert's Seminary; Achimota School; University of Ghana; Ghana School of Law; University of Phoenix
- Occupation: Politician, Lawyer
- Profession: Legal Practitioner

Anthony Mmieh (born May 13, 1971) is a Ghanaian lawyer and politician, currently serving as the Member of Parliament for the Odotobri constituency in the Ashanti Region. He represents the New Patriotic Party (NPP) and is a member of the Ninth Parliament of the Fourth Republic of Ghana.

== Early life and education ==
Anthony Mmieh was born on Thursday, 13 May 1971 and hails from EBUNUSU. He attended St. Hubert Seminary in 1989. Achimota college for his advanced level in 1991. He then proceeded to the University of Ghana for BA HONS in 1997.

== Early life and education ==
Mmieh was born on May 13, 1971, in Ebunusu, Ashanti Region. He attended St. Hubert's Seminary, completed his Ordinary Level in June 1989, and later attended Achimota College for A‑Levels in June 1991. He earned a BA (Hons) from the University of Ghana in July 1997, followed by an LL.B., and was called to the bar after attending the Ghana School of Law in October 2000. He also holds an MBA from the University of Phoenix (June 2009).

== Career ==
Mmieh is the managing Partner at Poku, Nyamaa & Associates, a legal firm in Kumasi and also the owner of TM legal consortium both in Kumasi and Accra He has been a member of the NPP Legal Team since 2016 and formerly served as vice-president of the Ghana Bar Association’s Ashanti Regional Chapter.

=== Politics ===
In February 2020, Mmieh declared his candidacy for the NPP parliamentary primaries in Odotobri, resigning from his Bar Association role to contest.

Mmieh contested and won the Odotobri parliamentary seat in the December 2024 general elections on the ticket of the New Patriotic Party (NPP), succeeding Emmanuel Akwasi Gyamfi. In Parliament, he serves on the Appointments Committee and the Constitutional, Legal and Parliamentary Affairs Committee.
