= Claudy Philips =

Welsh violinist (died 1732)

Claudy (Charles Claudius) Philips (died 1732) was a Welsh violinist who, although he died poor, has a monument in Wolverhampton Church.

The epitaph reads: "Near this place lies Charles Claudius Philips, whose absolute contempt of riches, and inimitable performances on the violin, made him the admiration of all who knew him. He was born in Wales, made the tour of Europe, and, after the experience of both kinds of fortune, died in 1732."

Dr Richard Wilkes wrote of him: "Exalted soul! Thy various sounds could please / The love-sick virgin, and the gouty ease, Could jarring crowds like old Amphion, move / To beauteous order and harmonious love./ Rest here in Peace, till angels bud these rise. /And meet thy Saviour's consort in the skies".

According to Boswell's Life of Johnson, the actor David Garrick recited Wilkes's poem to Dr Johnson, who then wrote his own “An Epitaph on Claudy Phillips, Musician” (1740): "Philips, whose touch harmonious could remove / The pangs of guilty power or hapless love; / Rest here, distressed by poverty no more. /Here find that calm thou gav'st so oft before; /Sleep, undisturbed, within this peaceful shrine, / Till angels wake thee with a note like thine". David Garrick also wrote an “Epitaph on Claudy Philips.”

Philips, who was a friend of the deaf clairvoyant Duncan Campbell, could speak sign language. Campbell says of him that he lodged at Claudy's mother's house, and that he "loved me all his Life"
