= Nii Armah Ashitey =

Ghanaian lawyer and politician

Hon Nii Armah Ashitey

Member of the Ghana Parliament for Korle Klottey
- In office 7 January 2009 – 7 January 2017
- Preceded by: Nii Adu Daku Mante
- Succeeded by: Zanetor Agyeman-Rawlings

Minister for Employment and Labour Relations
- In office 14 February 2013 – 7 January 2017
- President: John Dramani Mahama
- Preceded by: Moses Asaga (Employment and Social Welfare)

Greater Accra Regional Minister
- In office January 2009 – 7 January 2013
- President: John Atta Mills; John Dramani Mahama
- Preceded by: Shiekh Ibrahim Cudjoe Quaye
- Succeeded by: Joshua Nii Laryea Afotey-Agbo

Personal details
- Born: 28 January 1950 (age 76)
- Party: National Democratic Congress
- Education: Kwame Nkrumah University of Science and Technology
- Profession: Lawyer

Nii Armah Ashitey is a Ghanaian lawyer and politician. He is the Member of Parliament for Korle Klottey and is also the former minister for employment and labour relations in the Ghanaian government.

== Work ==
Ashietey studied at the Kwame Nkrumah University of Science and Technology at Kumasi, the capital of the Ashanti Region of Ghana. He graduated in 1975 with a Bachelor of Arts degree in social sciences. He later became a barrister-at-law in 1986 after studying at the Ghana School of Law. He worked as the chief executive officer of Ocerec Company Limited in Accra before going into politics.

== Politics ==
Ashitey was the chief executive for the Tema Metropolitan Area from 1993 to 2001. He joined the National Democratic Congress and stood on their ticket in the Ghanaian general election in December 2004, losing narrowly to the New Patriotic Party candidate Nii Adu Daku Mante. Four years later, he stood again for the same seat, winning with 50.6% of the vote and a majority of 2,622 (4.3%).

In 2009, he was appointed as the regional minister for the Greater Accra Region by President Mills. He continued in this position after the death of Mills. After John Dramani Mahama won the Ghanaian general election in December 2012, he was appointed as the new minister for employment and labour relations.

== See also ==
- Korle Klottey

Parliament of Ghana
Preceded by Nii Adu Daku Mante	MP for Korle Klottey; 2009 – 2017	Succeeded by Zanetor Agyeman-Rawlings
Political offices
Preceded by Shiekh Ibrahim Cudjoe Quaye	Greater Accra Regional Minister; 2009 – 2013	Succeeded by Joseph Nii Laryea Afotey-Agbo
Preceded by Moses Asaga	Minister for Employment and Labour Relations; 2013 – 2014	Succeeded by Haruna Iddrisu
