= Gomoa East (Ghana parliament constituency) =

Constituency in the Central Region of Ghana

- constituency for the Parliament of Ghana
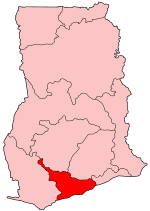
- District: Gomoa District
- Region: Central Region of Ghana

Current constituency
- Party: National Democratic Congress
- MP: Desmond De-Graft Paitoo

Gomoa East is one of the constituencies represented in the Parliament of Ghana. It elects one Member of Parliament (MP) by the first past the post system of election. Desmond De-Graft Paitoo is the member of parliament for the constituency. Gomoa East is located in the Gomoa district of the Central Region of Ghana.

== Boundaries ==
The seat is located entirely within the Gomoa district of the Central Region of Ghana.

== Members of Parliament ==
Election	Member	Party
1992	Franis Kow Bortsie-Ansah	National Democratic Congress
1996	Thomas Kweku Aubyn	National Democratic Congress
2000	Emmanuel Acheampong	New Patriotic Party
2003	Richard Sam Quarm	New Patriotic Party
2008	Ekow Panyin Okyere Eduamoah	National Democratic Congress
2016	Kojo Asemanyi	New Patriotic Party
2020	Desmond De-Graft Paitoo	National Democratic Congress

== Elections ==
2008 Ghanaian parliamentary election: Gomoa East Source:Electoral Commission of Ghana
Party	Candidate	Votes	%	±%
National Democratic Congress	Ekow Panyin Okyere Eduamoah	18,908	53.7	15.5
New Patriotic Party	Richmond Sam Quarm	13,300	37.8	−14.1
Convention People's Party	Richmond K. Anwumanyi	2,738	7.8	4.9
Democratic Freedom Party	Kofi Otu	266	0.8	—
Independent	Ato Aidoo Nyanor	217	0.3	−4.8
Majority		7,268	10.1	3.4
Turnout		35,905	64.7	−16.8

2004 Ghanaian parliamentary election: Gomoa East Source:National Electoral Commission, Ghana
Party	Candidate	Votes	%	±%
New Patriotic Party	Richmond Sam Quarm	19,634	51.9	−15.4
National Democratic Congress	Theophilus Kofi Ampah	14,454	38.2	+6.5
Independent	Kofi Otu	1933	5.1	—
Convention People's Party	Grace Ignophia Appiah	1102	2.9	—
Democratic People's Party	Evans Kofi Otoo	250	0.7	−0.3
People's National Convention	Justice Ekow Asafua Ocran	235	0.6	—
Independent	Michael L. K. Amoah	193	0.5	—
Majority		5180	13.7	−19.4
Turnout		38,505	82.1	—

Richmond Sam Quarm (NPP) won the by-election held on the 8 April 2003 following the death of Emmanuel Acheampong (NPP) in a road traffic accident on February 9, 2003.

Gomoa East by-election, 2003 Source:Ghana Home Page
Party	Candidate	Votes	%	±%
New Patriotic Party	Richmond Sam Quarm	11,380	67.3	19.7
National Democratic Congress	Richard Annan	5,356	31.7	−13.4
Democratic People's Party	Evans Kofi Otoo	175	1.0	—
Majority		6,024	35.6	33.1

2000 Ghanaian parliamentary election: Gomoa East Source:Adam Carr's Election Archives
Party	Candidate	Votes	%	±%
New Patriotic Party	Emmanuel Acheampong	10,900	47.6	12.9
National Democratic Congress	Richard Annan	10,332	45.1	−15.5
Convention People's Party	Michael L. K. Amoah	792	3.5	—
National Reform Party	James Kwaw Buafi	496	2.2	—
United Ghana Movement	Kwame Ebure	233	1.0	—
People's National Convention	Sam Ken Mensah	165	0.7	−1.4
Majority		568	2.5	−23.4

1996 Ghanaian parliamentary election: Cape Coast Source:Electoral Commission of Ghana
Party	Candidate	Votes	%	±%
National Democratic Congress	Thomas Kweku Aubyn	18,390	60.6	—
New Patriotic Party	Kofi Nyarko-Annan	10,547	34.7	—
People's Convention Party	Abraham Kofi Sackey	783	2.6	—
People's National Convention	Sam Ken Mensah	643	2.1	—
Majority		7,843	25.9	—
Turnout		30,929	72.6	—

1992 Ghanaian parliamentary election: Gomoa East Source:Electoral Commission of Ghana
Party	Candidate	Votes	%	±%
National Democratic Congress	Franis Kow Bortsie-Ansah	—	—	—
Majority		—	—	—
Turnout		12,095	30.9	—

== See also ==
- List of Ghana Parliament constituencies
