= Tamale South (Ghana parliament constituency) =

Ghana parliament constituency

- constituency for the Parliament of Ghana
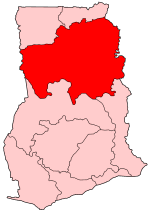
- District: Tamale Municipal District
- Region: Northern Region of Ghana

Current constituency
- Created: 2004
- Party: National Democratic Congress
- MP: Haruna Iddrisu

Tamale South is one of the constituencies represented in the Parliament of Ghana. It elects one member of Parliament (MP) by the first-past-the-post system of election. Tamale South is located in the Tamale Municipal district of the Northern Region of Ghana.

This seat was created prior to the Ghanaian parliamentary election in 2004.

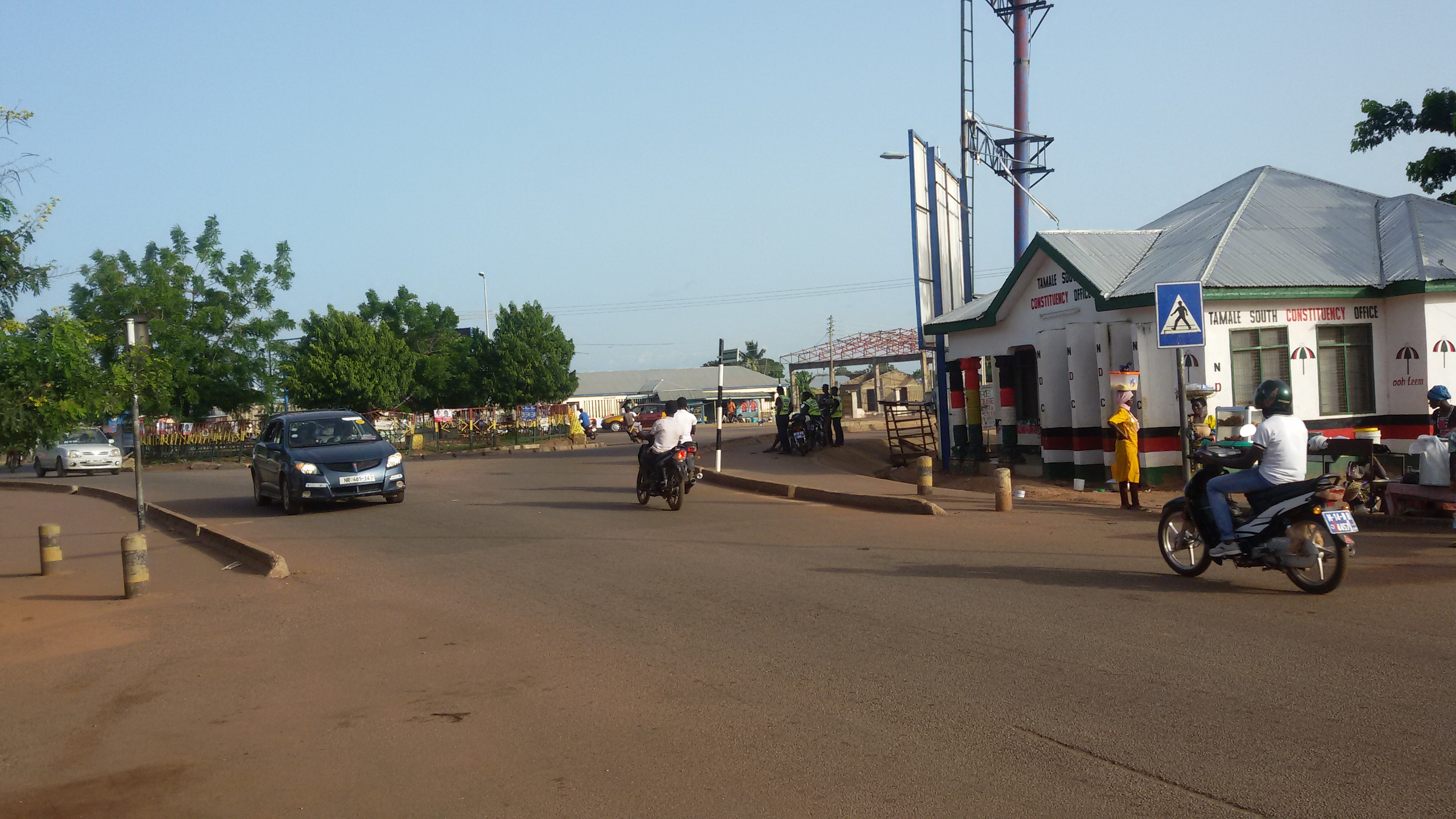
Tarred road towards roundabout at the center of Tamale South Constituency showing NDC office on the right

== Boundaries ==
The seat is located within the Tamale Municipal district of the Northern Region of Ghana.

== Members of Parliament ==
Election	Member	Party
2004	Constituency created	
2004	Haruna Iddrisu	National Democratic Congress
2008	Haruna Iddrisu	National Democratic Congress
2012	Haruna Iddrisu	National Democratic Congress
2016	Haruna Iddrisu	National Democratic Congress
2020	Haruna Iddrisu	National Democratic Congress

== Elections ==
2004 Ghanaian parliamentary election: Tamale South Source:Ghana Home Page
Party	Candidate	Votes	%	±%
National Democratic Congress	Haruna Iddrisu	39,204	72.8	—
New Patriotic Party	Alhaji Mustapha Ali Idris	12,116	22.5	—
Convention People's Party	Dr Abubakar Al-Hassan	1,908	3.5	—
People's National Convention	Mohammed Adam Nashiru	377	0.7	—
Democratic People's Party	Hajia Kande Abukari	251	0.5	—
Majority		27,008	50.3	—

The table below shows Tamale South constituency parliamentary election results for the 2008 Ghanaian general election.

2008 Ghanaian general election: Tamale South Source:Ghana Home Page
Party	Candidate	Votes	%	±%
National Democratic Congress	Haruna Iddrisu	44,332	78.30	—
New Patriotic Party	Ibrahim Abdul Kadir	11,356	20.06	—
Convention People's Party	Alhaji Fuseini Ibn Alhassan	717	1.27	—
Democratic People's Party	Ibrahim Mariam	213	0.38	—
Majority		44,332	78.30	—

The table below shows Tamale South constituency election results for 2012 Ghanaian general election.

2012 Ghanaian general election: Tamale South Source:.constituency.php?ID=141 Ghana Home Page
Party	Candidate	Votes	%	±%
National Democratic Congress	Haruna Iddrisu	53,320	74.69	—
New Patriotic Party	Abdallah Pegu Shamsudeen	16,395	22.5	—
PPP	Mohammed Abdul Karim	825	1.15	—
People's National Convention	Alidu Mohammed Nasirdeen	364	0.51	—
Convention People's Party	Abdul Rahman	290	0.41	—
NDP	Seidu Umar Farouk	126	0.18	—
Democratic People's Party	Ibrahim Mariam	72	0.10	—
Majority		53,320	74.69	—

This table shows Tamale South constituency 2016 Ghanaian general election.

2016 Ghanaian general election: Tamale South Source:Ghana Home Page
Party	Candidate	Votes	%	±%
National Democratic Congress	Haruna Iddrisu	52,235	72.56	—
New Patriotic Party	Yakubu Yussif	18,932	26.30	—
Convention People's Party	Abdul Jalilu Kassim	625	0.87	—
People's National Convention	Abdallah Alhassan Goudi	193	0.27	—
Majority		52,235	72.56	—

The below table shows the parliamentary election results for Tamale South constituency in the 2020 Ghanaian general election.

2020 Ghanaian general election: Tamale South Source:Ghana Home Page
Party	Candidate	Votes	%	±%
National Democratic Congress	Haruna Iddrisu	69,267	73.72	—
New Patriotic Party	Yakubu Yussif	23,417	24.92	—
Convention People's Party	Abdul Jalilu Kassim	732	0.78	—
PPP	Imoro Nabila Sualisu	541	0.58	—
Majority		69,267	73.72	—

== See also ==
- List of Ghana Parliament constituencies
