= Ashanti Regional Minister =

Ghana government official position

The Ashanti Regional Minister is the Ghana government official who is responsible for overseeing the administration of the Ashanti Region of Ghana. The region is home to the Ashanti people who are ruled by the Asantehene. It has always been a politically important region due to this. Since the December 2019 referendum, there are currently sixteen administrative regions in Ghana. The capital has always been at Kumasi.

== List of Ashanti Regional Ministers ==
Number	Minister	Took office	Left office	Government	Party
1	Charles de Graft Dickson (MP)	1957	Dec 1959	Nkrumah government	Convention Peoples' Party
2	R. O. Amoako-Atta (MP)	Dec 1959	Jul 1960	Nkrumah government	Convention Peoples' Party
3	Osei Owusu Afriyie (MP)	1960	1961	Nkrumah government	Convention Peoples' Party
4	R. O. Amoako-Atta (MP)	Nov 1961	Oct 1963	Nkrumah government	Convention Peoples' Party
5	Stephen Willie Yeboah (MP)	Oct 1963	1965	Nkrumah government	Convention Peoples' Party
6	R. O. Amoako-Atta (MP)	1965	Feb 1966	Nkrumah government	Convention Peoples' Party
7	Brigadier D. C. K. Amenu	Feb 1966	April 1967	National Liberation Council	Military government
8	J. T. D. Addy	April 1967	May 1967	National Liberation Council	Military government
9	G. K. Yarboi	May 1967	1969	National Liberation Council	Military government
10	H. R. Annan (MP)	October 1969	June 1971	Busia government	Progress Party
11	Maxwell Owusu (MP)	June 1971	January 1972	Busia government	Progress Party
12	Lt. Colonel E. A. Baidoo (Regional Commissioner)	January 1972	May 1974	National Redemption Council	Military government
13	Commander Joy K. Amedume (Regional Commissioner)	May 1974	October 1975	National Redemption Council	Military government
14	Major L. K. Kodjiku (Regional Commissioner)	October 1975	1977	Supreme Military Council	Military government
15	Commander G. E. Osei (Regional Commissioner)	1977	1978	Supreme Military Council	Military government
16	Colonel R. K. Zumah (Regional Commissioner)	1978	4 June 1979	Supreme Military Council	Military government
16	Colonel R. K. Zumah (Regional Commissioner)	4 June 1979	24 September 1979	Armed Forces Revolutionary Council	Military government
17	J. O. Afram	1979	31 Dec 1981	Limann government	People's National Party
18	J. Y. Ansah (Regional Secretary)			Provisional National Defence Council	Military government
19	Daniel Ohene Agyekum	April 1992	6 January 1993	Provisional National Defence Council	Military government
19	Daniel Ohene Agyekum	1993	6 Jan 1997	Rawlings government	National Democratic Congress
20	Kojo Yankah	1997	1999	Rawlings government	National Democratic Congress
21	Samuel Nuamah Donkor	1999	6 Jan 2001	Rawlings government	National Democratic Congress
22	Sampson Kwaku Boafo	2001	2006	Kufuor government	New Patriotic Party
23	Emmanuel A. Owusu-Ansah	2006	January 2009	Kufuor government	New Patriotic Party
24	Kofi Opoku-Manu	2009	2011	Mills government	National Democratic Congress
25	Kwaku Agyemang-Mensah	2011	24 July 2012	Mills government	National Democratic Congress
25	Kwaku Agyemang-Mensah	24 July 2012	January 2013	Mahama government	National Democratic Congress
25	Samuel Sarpong	February 2013	March 2013	Mahama government	National Democratic Congress
26	Eric Opoku	March 2013	July 2014	Mahama government	National Democratic Congress
27	Samuel Sarpong	July 2014	March 2015	Mahama government	National Democratic Congress
28	Peter Anarfi-Mensah	March 2015	2017	Mahama government	National Democratic Congress
29	Simon Osei-Mensah	February 2017	January 2025	Akufo-Addo government	New Patriotic Party
30	Frank Amoakohene	30 January 2025	Incumbent	Mahama government 2	National Democratic Congress

== See also ==
- Ministers of the Ghanaian Government
- Ashanti Region
