= G. K. Yarboi =

Ghanaian soldier, politician

Ashanti Regional Minister
- In office May 1967 – 1969
- President: Joseph Arthur Ankrah
- Preceded by: J. T. D. Addy
- Succeeded by: H. R. Annan

Personal details
- Born: Central Region
- Citizenship: Ghanaian

G. K. Yarboi was a Ghanaian soldier, politician, and member of the National Liberation Council. He was the Chairman of the Ashanti Region Committee of Administration from 1967 to 1969.

== Biography ==
Yarboi was born in 1936 in the Central Region. He joined the army as a private, and became a quartermaster in 1966. In May 1967, he was appointed Chairman of the Ashanti Regional Administration Committee (Regional Minister). He worked in this capacity from May 1967 to 1969 when the country was ushered into civilian rule. He was succeeded by Henry Reginald Annan.

Yarboi's hobbies included playing football.
