= Ekow Panyin Okyere Eduamoah =

Ghanaian politician (born 1972)

Hon. Ekow Panyin Okyere Eduamoah

Regional Minister for Central region (Ghana)
- Incumbent
- Assumed office February 2025
- President: John Mahama
- Vice President: Jane Naana Opoku-Agyemang
- Preceded by: Kwamena Duncan
- Constituency: Gomoa East

Member of Parliament
- In office 7 January 2009 – 6 January 2017
- President: John Atta Mills
- Preceded by: Richard Sam Quarm
- Succeeded by: Kojo Asemanyi
- Majority: NDC

Personal details
- Born: 23 November 1972 (age 53)
- Party: National Democratic Congress
- Children: 2
- Education: University of Cape Coast
- Occupation: Educationist

Ekow Panyin Okyere Eduamoah is a Ghanaian politician and a former member of parliament representing Gomoa East constituency in the Central region of Ghana.

He is currently serving as the Central region (Ghana)'s minister.

== Early life and education ==
Ekow was born on 3 November 1972 in Potsin, a town in the Central Region of Ghana.He is a graduate of the University of Cape Coast where he obtained a Diploma in Management Studies in 2006.

== Politics ==
He is a member of the National Democratic Congress. He was first elected as member of the parliament to represent Gomoa East Constituency in the 2008 Ghanaian General Elections. He thus represented the constituency in the 5th parliament of the 4th republic. He was elected with 18,908 votes out of the 35,212total valid votes cast, equivalent to 53.70% of total valid votes cast. He was elected over Richmond Sam Quarm of the New Patriotic Party, Kofi Otu of the Democratic Freedom Party and Richmond K. Anwumanyi Grant of the Convention People's Party. These obtained 37.77%, 0.76% and 7.78% respectively of total valid votes cast. He also won his re-election bid into the office in the 2012 General Elections but lost his third re-election bid into the office in 2016 General Elections. He was a committee member on Gender and Children, Employment, Social Welfare and State, Public Accounts. He was succeeded in office by kojo Asemanyi of the New Patriotic Party.

== Employment ==
He is an educationist/teacher and was the proprietor of Multi-Care Preparatory School in Gomoa-Potsin.

== Personal life ==
Ekow is married with two children. He is a Christian (Methodist).
