= Amena =

Amena may refer to:

- Amina (disambiguation)#Amena, the name of several people
- Amena, former name of Orange España
- Amena, a character in the 1719 novel Love in Excess; or, The Fatal Enquiry by Eliza Haywood
- Hovala amena, a butterfly in the family Hesperiidae

== See also ==
- Amenas (disambiguation)
- Amenia (disambiguation)
