= Richard Sam Quarm =

Ghanaian politician

Hon. Richard Sam Quarm

Member of Parliament for Gomoa East
- In office 7 January 2005 – 6 January 2009
- President: John Kufuor
- Preceded by: Emmanuel Acheampong
- Succeeded by: Ekow Panyin Okyere Eduamoah

Personal details
- Born: 28 July 1964 (age 62)
- Party: New Patriotic Party
- Education: University of Ghana
- Profession: Accountant

Richard Sam Quarm is a Ghanaian politician and was the Member of Parliament for the Gomoa East constituency in the Central Region of Ghana, in the 4th parliament of the 4th republic of Ghana.

== Early life and education ==
Quarm was born on 28 July 1964. He attended the University of Ghana, where he obtained a Master of Business degree. He majored in accounting.

== Career ==
Quarm is an accountant by profession. He is also a politician.

== Politics ==
Quarm entered politics after being elected as the member of parliament for the Gomoa East Constituency in the Central region of Ghana in the 2004 Ghanaian general elections. He is a member of the New Patriotic Party. Quarm served for only a term as the member of parliament for the Gomoa East constituency. He thus represented the constituency in the 4th parliament of the 4th republic of Ghana from 7 January 2005 to 6 January 2009. He was oust in the subsequent elections, the 2008 Ghanaian general elections, by Ekow Panyin Okyere Eduamoah of the major opposition party, the National Democratic Congress.

=== 2004 Elections ===
Quarm was elected as the member of parliament in the 2004 Ghanaian general elections with 19,634votes out of 37,801 total valid votes cast. THis was equivalent to 51.9% of the total valid votes cast. He was elected over Justice Ekow Asafua-Ocran of the People's National Convention, Theophilus Kofi Ampah of the National Democratic Congress, Grace Ignophia Appia of the Convention People's Party, Evans Kofi Otoo of the Democratic People's Party; and Kofi Otu and Michael Leonard Kojo Amoah—two independent candidates. These obtained 0.6%, 38.2%, 2.9%, 0.7%, 5.1% and 0.5% respectively of the total valid votes cast. Quarm was elected on the ticket of the New Patriotic Party. His constituency was a part of the 16 constituencies won by the New Patriotic Party in the Central region in that elections. In all, the New Patriotic Party won a majority total 128 parliamentary seats in the 4th parliament of the 4th republic of Ghana.

== Personal life ==
Quarm is a Christian.

== See also ==
- List of MPs elected in the 2004 Ghanaian parliamentary election
