= Franis Kow Bortsie-Ansah =

Ghanaian politician, born 1955

Hon. Francis Kow Bortsie-Ansah

Member of the Ghana Parliament for Gomoa East
- In office 7 January 1993 – 6 January 1997

Personal details
- Born: 3 January 1955 (age 71) Gomoa East
- Party: National Democratic Congress
- Education: University of Ghana
- Occupation: Teacher

Francis Kow Bortsie-Ansah (born 3 January 1955) is a Ghanaian politician who was a member of the first Parliament of the Fourth Republic representing the Gomoa East in the Central Region on the ticket of the National Democratic Congress.

== Early life and education ==
Bortsie-Ansah was born on 3 January 1955 at Gomoa East in the Central Region of Ghana. He attended the University of Ghana and obtained a Bachelor of Arts in SMCIT.

== Career ==
He is a Teacher by profession and a former member of Parliament for the Gomoa East Constituency in the Central Region of Ghana.

== Politics ==
He was first sworn into Parliament on the ticket of the National Democratic Congress during the December 1992 Ghanaian general elections for the Gomoa East constituency in the Central region of Ghana. In 1996 elections, he was defeated by Thomas Kweku Aubyn during the parliamentary primaries. Thomas polled, during the Ghanaian general election, 18,390 votes out of the 100% valid votes cast representing 43.20% over his opponents Kofi Nyarko-Annan of the New Patriotic Party who polled 10,547 votes representing 24.80% and Abraham Kofi Sackey of the Convention People's Party who polled 783 votes representing 1.80%. He served only One term as a Parliamentarian.

== Personal life ==
He is a Christian.
