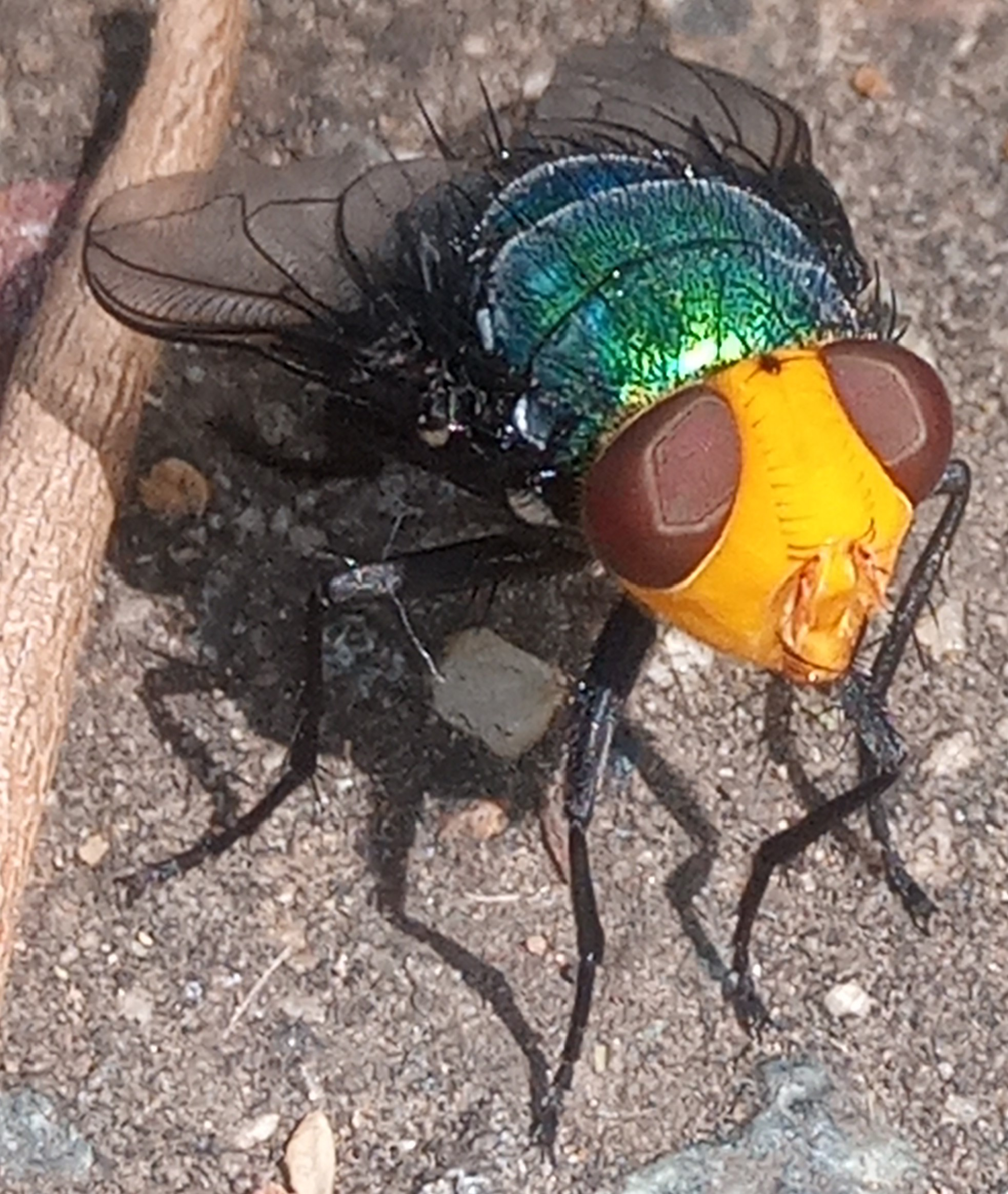

Scientific classification
- Domain: Eukaryota
- Kingdom: Animalia
- Phylum: Arthropoda
- Class: Insecta
- Order: Diptera
- Family: Calliphoridae
- Genus: Amenia
- Species: A. imperialis

Binomial name
- Amenia imperialis Robineau-Desvoidy, 1830

Synonyms
- Amenia imperialis imperialis, Crosskey, 1965; Grapholostylum latifrons, Enderlein, 1936; Amenia dubitalis, Malloch, 1927

= Amenia imperialis =

Species of fly

Amenia imperialis is a blowfly in the family Calliphoridae.

== Larvae ==
Studies suggest that Amenia imperialis is macrolarviparous, giving birth to well developed and large larvae.

== Distribution ==
Amenia imperialis is found in Australia.

It has been reported that "... that two other "forms" of A. imperialis can be distinguished: one occurring in northwestern Australia and arid areas of New South Wales and Queensland, the other in the vicinity of Cooktown, Queensland."

== Gallery ==
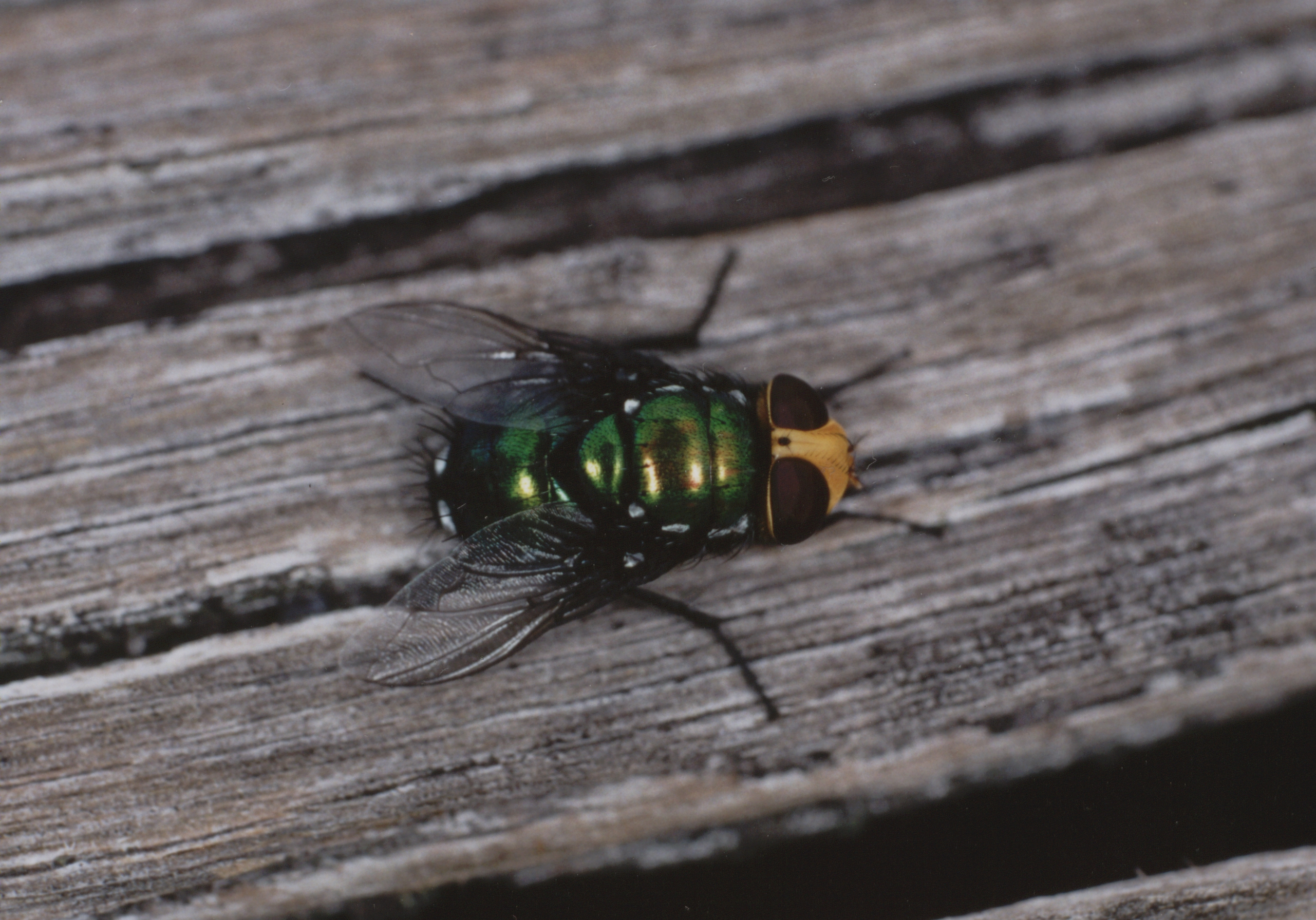
Yengo National Park, Australia 2009

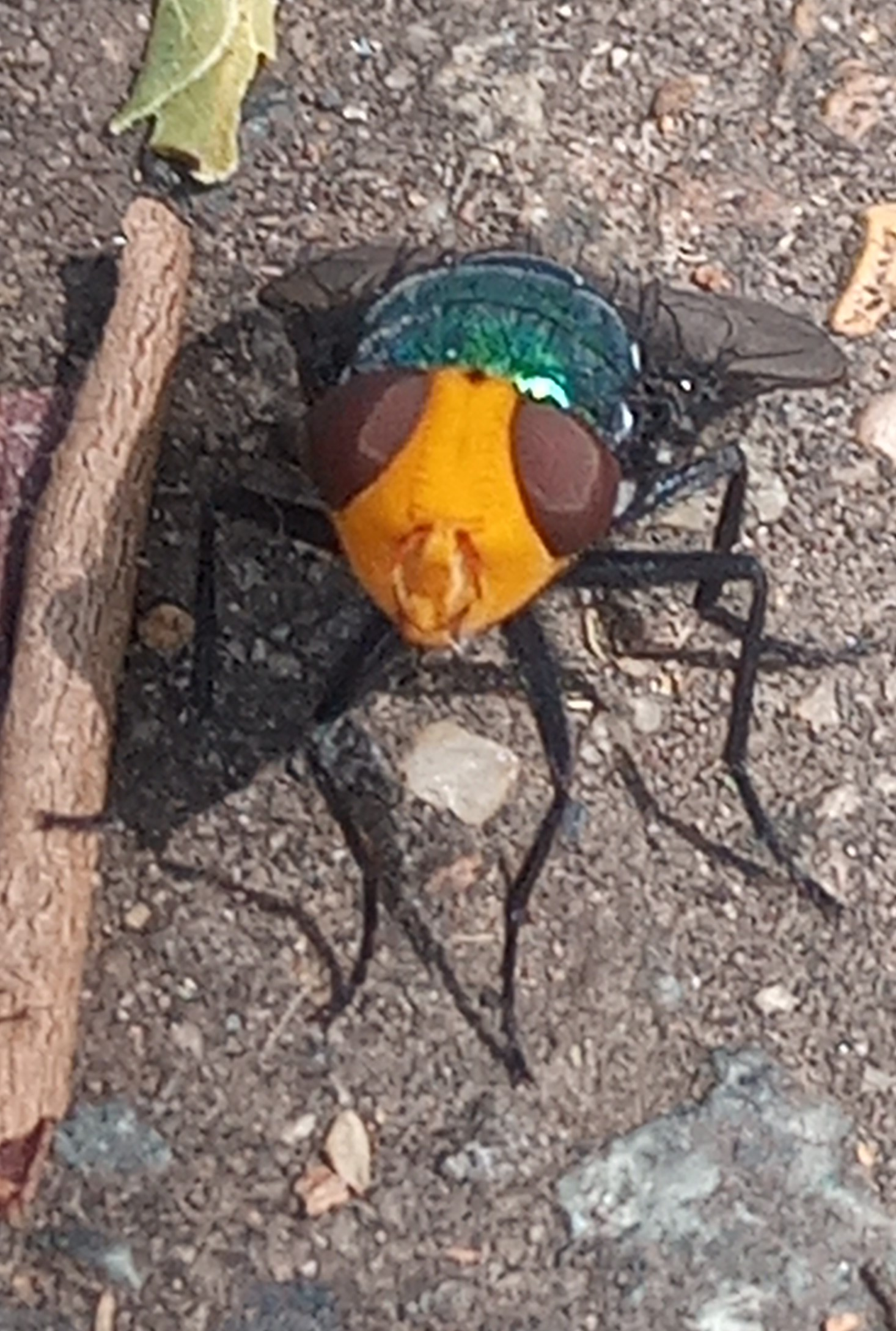
Sydney, Australia 2022
