= Desmond De-Graft Paitoo =

Ghanaian politician

Hon. Desmond De-Graft Paitoo MP
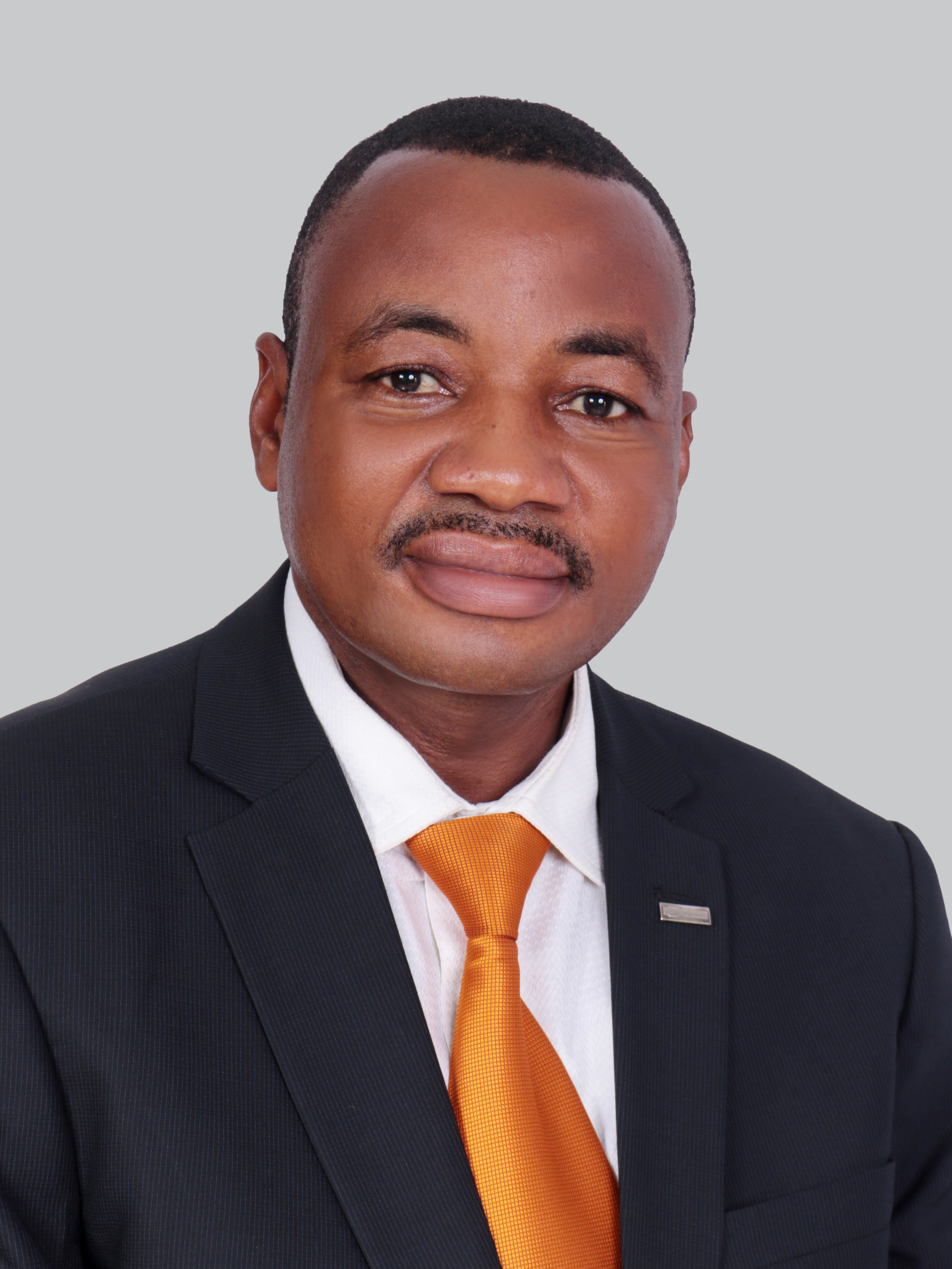

Member of Parliament for Gomoa East Constituency
- Incumbent
- Assumed office 7 January 2021
- President: Nana Akuffo Addo
- Preceded by: Kojo Asemanyi

Personal details
- Born: 21 August 1969 (age 56) Gomoa Dasum, Ghana
- Party: National Democratic Congress
- Occupation: Freight Forwarder
- Profession: Politician
- Committees: House Committee; Food, Agriculture and Cocoa Affairs Committee

Desmond De-Graft Paitoo (born 21 August 1969) is a Ghanaian politician who currently serves as the Member of Parliament for the Gomoa East Constituency.

== Early life and education ==
Desmond De-Graft was born on 21 August 1969 and hails from Gomoa Dasum in the Central Region of Ghana. Desmond De-Graft had his MSLC in 1987, City and Guild Intermediate in Mechanical Engineering in 1991 and his Degree in Supply Chain Management (Procurement) in 2018.

== Career ==
Desmond De-Graft is the Chief Executive Officer (CEO) of Desreen Shipping and Logistics. He is a freight forwarder.

== Political life ==
Desmond De-Graft is a member of the National Democratic Congress. He contested and won the NDC parliamentary primaries for Gomoa East Constituency in the Central Region of Ghana.

=== 2016 election ===
In the 2016 Ghanaian general election, he lost the Gomoa East Constituency parliamentary seat to the New Patriotic Party parliamentary candidate Kojo Asemanyi. He lost with 15,010 votes making 42.5% of the total votes cast whilst Kojo had 17,654 votes making 50.0% of the total votes cast, an Independent candidate Marcus Yaw Danso who had 1,604 votes making 4.5% of the total votes cast, Eunice Assuman of PPP who also had 920 votes making 2.6% of the total votes cast and Godfred Kumedzro Cudjo of CPP had 105 votes making 0.3% of the total votes cast.

=== 2020 election ===
Desmond De-Graft won the parliamentary seat for the Gomoa East Constituency during the 2020 Ghanaian general elections on the ticket of the National Democratic Congress with 36,637 votes making 49.46% of the total votes cast to join the Eighth (8th) Parliament of the Fourth Republic of Ghana against Kojo Asemanyi of the New Patriotic Party who had 135,873 votes making 48.42% of the total votes cast, Samuel Kofi Essel of GUM who had 1,397 votes making 1.89% of the total votes cast and Emmanuel Otchere of UPP who also had 173 votes making 0.23% of the total votes cast.

=== Committees ===
Desmond De-Graft is a member of the House Committee. He is also a member of the Food, Agriculture and Cocoa Affairs Committee of the Eighth (8th) Parliament of the Fourth Republic of Ghana.

== Personal life ==
Desmond De-Graft is a Christian

== Philanthropy ==
In January 2022, he pledged to support the construction of a health facility with hospital furniture and other items at Dampase in the Central Region.

== Controversy ==
In November 2020, De-Graft was sued by Akwasi Adjetey, a businessman for allegedly collapsing his business.
