= Kojo Asemanyi =

Ghanaian politician (born 1979)

Hon. Kojo Asemanyi MP

Member of the Ghana Parliament for Gomoa East Constituency
- In office 7 January 2017 – 6 January 2021
- Preceded by: Ekow Panyin
- Succeeded by: Desmond De-Graft Paitoo
- President: Nana Akuffo-Addo

Personal details
- Born: Kojo Asemanyi; 10 September 1979 (age 47) Gomoa Buduatta, Ghana
- Party: New Patriotic Party
- Education: Cape Coast Polytechnic, University of Cape Coast, University of Phoenix
- Occupation: Politician
- Profession: Sales and Marketing Executive
- Committees: Parliamentary Select Committee on Sports (Deputy Chairman)

Kojo Asemanyi is a Ghanaian politician and was a member of the Seventh Parliament of the Fourth Republic of Ghana representing the Gomoa East Constituency in the Central Region on the ticket of the New Patriotic Party. An Elder of the Church of Pentecost and a Christian, he is a husband and a father.

== Early life and education ==
Asemanyi was born on 10 September 1979 and hails from Gomoa Buduatta in the Central Region of Ghana. He had his Higher National Diploma from the Cape Coast Polytechnic. He had his bachelor's degree in Management Studies from the University of Cape Coast in 2011. He further had his master's degree in Public Administration in the University of Phoenix in Arizona in USA.

== Career ==
Asemanyi worked at the US Postal Service as a Rural Carrier Associate in Delaware in USA from 2013 to 2016. He was also a Program Officer at World Vision Ghana from 2005 to 2008. He was also a Sales supervisor for Tigo from 2008 to 2012. He was also a Production Associate for Nixon Uniforms from 2012 to 2013.

== Politics ==
Asemanyi is a member of the New Patriotic Party. He contested in the NPP primaries election and won against Dr Marqus Yaw Danso. He is the former Member of Parliament for Gomoa East Constituency in the Central Region.

=== 2016 election ===
He defeated Desmond De-Graft Paitoo in the 2016 Ghanaian general election to win the Gomoa East Constituency parliamentary seat. He won with 17,654 votes making 50.0% of the total votes cast whilst Desmond had 15,010 votes making 42.5% of the total votes cast, an Independent candidate Marcus Yaw Danso who had 1,604 votes making 4.5% of the total votes cast, Eunice Assuman of PPP who also had 920 votes making 2.6% of the total votes cast and Godfred Kumedzro Cudjo of CPP had 105 votes making 0.3% of the total votes cast.

=== Committee ===
Asemanyi was the Deputy Chairman of Parliamentary Select Committee on Sports.

=== 2020 election ===
Asemanyi lost the Gomoa East Constituency parliamentary seat during the 2020 Ghanaian general elections to the NDC parliamentary candidate Desmond De-Graft Paitoo. He lost with 35,873 votes making 48.4% of the total votes cast whilst Desmond had 36,637 votes making 49.5% of the total votes cast, Samuel Kofi Essel of GUM who had 1,397 votes making 1.89% of the total votes cast and Emmanuel Otchere of UPP who also had 173 votes making 0.23% of the total votes cast.

== Personal life ==
Asemanyi is a Christian.

== Philanthropy ==
In June 2017, he presented about 15 hospital beds to the Gomoa Nyanyano Health Center, Buduatta Health Center and the Ojobi Health Center in the Central Region.

In June 2019, Asemanyi presented about 35,000 liters of premix fuel to about 2,300 fishermen in the Central Region of Ghana.

In December 2019 during the Farmer's and Fisher's Day Celebration in Gomoa East, he presented a tricycle to the best farmer.
