= Amenas =

Amenas may refer to:

- In Amenas, town and municipality in eastern Algeria
- In Amenas District, district in Illizi Province, Algeria
- In Amenas Airport, airport in eastern Algeria

== See also ==
- In Amenas hostage crisis, a 2013 incident in eastern Algeria
- Amena (disambiguation)
