= Ameni =

Ameni may refer to:

- "Ameni" (song), by Miss Pru DJ, 2016
- Ameni, Egyptian prince on whose stele 20th century BCE Haankhes and Sobekemsaf I, Vayigash are recorded
- Ameny, Amenemhat II
- Ameni, old spelling of Amini, India
