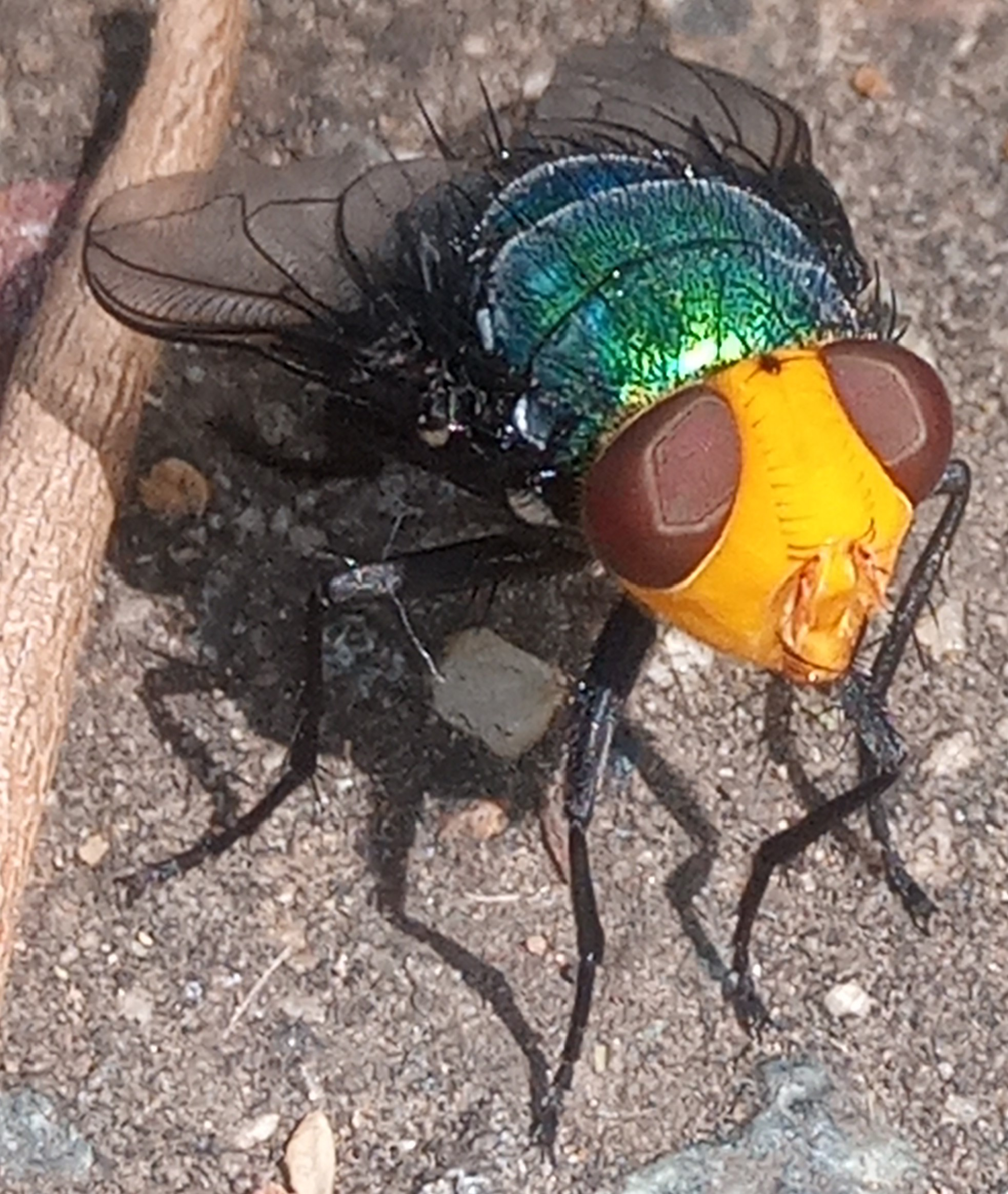
- Amenia imperialis

Scientific classification
- Domain: Eukaryota
- Kingdom: Animalia
- Phylum: Arthropoda
- Class: Insecta
- Order: Diptera
- Family: Calliphoridae
- Genus: Amenia; Robineau-Desvoidy, 1830

= Amenia (fly) =

Genus of insects

Amenia is a genus of flies belonging to the family Calliphoridae.

== Larvae ==
Studies suggest that all species of Amenia are macrolarviparous, giving birth to well developed and large larvae.

== Distribution ==
The species of the genus Amenia are found in Australia.

== Species ==
- Amenia albosquamata Colless, 1998
- Amenia chrysame (Walker, 1849)
- Amenia crinita Colless, 1998
- Amenia imperialis Robineau-Desvoidy, 1830
- Amenia leonina (Fabricius, 1775)
- Amenia longicornis (Malloch, 1930)
- Amenia sexpunctata Malloch, 1933
