= Frank Amoakohene =

Ghanaian politician and medical doctor

Ashanti Regional Minister
- Incumbent
- Assumed office February 2025
- President: John Dramani Mahama
- Preceded by: Simon Osei-Mensah

Personal details
- Born: 24 September 1990 (age 36)
- Party: National Democratic Congress (NDC)
- Children: 2
- Occupation: Politician, Medical Practitioner

Frank Amoakohene (born 24 September 1990) is a Ghanaian politician and medical practitioner. He has been serving as the Ashanti Regional Minister since January 2025, following his appointment by President John Dramani Mahama. Before his appointment, he served as the Ashanti Regional Secretary for the National Democratic Congress (NDC).

== Early life and education ==
Amoakohene began his early education at St. Monica’s Primary School and continued at St. Andrews Junior High School. He later attended Osei Tutu Senior High School in Kumasi, where he obtained his West African Senior School Certificate Examination (WASSCE) in 2008.

He enrolled at the University of Ghana and graduated in 2014 with a Bachelor of Science in Medical Laboratory Sciences. He continued his medical education at the same institution, earning a Bachelor of Medicine, Bachelor of Surgery (MBChB) degree in 2020. In 2023, he completed a Doctor of Medical Laboratory Science degree at the University for Development Studies (UDS). He also obtained a Master of Business Administration (MBA) from Accra Business School in 2024.

== Career ==
Amoakohene became active in politics through student leadership and later joined the National Democratic Congress (NDC). In the 2020 general elections, he contested as the NDC parliamentary candidate for the Mampong constituency.

In December 2022, he was elected Ashanti Regional Secretary of the NDC, where he helped coordinate party activities and engage with regional structures. On 14 January 2025, President John Dramani Mahama nominated him as Ashanti Regional Minister. Following parliamentary approval, he assumed office to oversee the implementation of government policies and development initiatives in the region.

== Personal life ==
Amoakohene is married to Juliet Amoakohene, who works as a registered midwife, and together they have three children.
