= Thomas Kweku Aubyn =

Ghanaian politician

Member of parliament for Gomoa East Constituency
- In office 7 January 1997 – 6 January 2001
- President: John Jerry Rawlings

Personal details
- Born: Gomoa East, Central Region Ghana
- Party: National Democratic Congress
- Occupation: Politician
- Profession: Lawyer

Thomas Kweku Aubyn is a Ghanaian politician and a member of the Second Parliament of the Fourth Republic representing the Gomoa East Constituency in the Central Region of Ghana.

== Early life ==
Thomas Kweku Aubyn was born at Gomoa East in the Central Region of Ghana.

== Politics ==
Aubyn was first elected into Parliament on the ticket of the National Democratic Congress for the Gomoa East Constituency in the Central Region of Ghana during the 1996 Ghanaian general elections. He polled 18,390 votes out of the 29,720 valid votes cast representing 43.20% over Kofi Nyarko-Annan of the New Patriotic Party who polled 10,547 votes representing 24.80% and Abraham Kofi Sackey of the Convention People's Party who polled 783 votes representing 1.80%.
