= Odotobri (Ghana parliament constituency) =

Constituency in the Ashanti Region of Ghana

- constituency for the Parliament of Ghana
- District: Amansie Central District
- Region: Ashanti Region of Ghana

Current constituency
- Party: New Patriotic Party
- MP: Anthony Mmieh

Odotobri is one of the constituencies represented in the Parliament of Ghana. It elects one Member of Parliament (MP) by the first past the post system of election

Anthony Mmieh is the current member of parliament for the constituency. He was elected on the ticket of the New Patriotic Party (NPP) in 2024. He had also represented the constituency in the 4th Republic parliament in 2004.
