= George Opare-Addo =

Minister of Youth Development and Empowerment: George Opare-Addo, ESQ

Hon George Opare-Addo, ESQ

Minister of Youth Development and Empowerment (National Youth Authority)
- Incumbent
- Assumed office Jan 2025
- President: John Dramani Mahama

Personal details
- Born: 15 March 1981 (age 45) Nima, Accra
- Party: National Democratic Congress
- Education: Adisadel College; University of Ghana
- Occupation: Politician
- Profession: Lawyer

George Opare-Addo (born 15 March 1981) is a Ghanaian politician who is the Minister of Youth Development and Empowerment of Ghana under the John Mahama Government. He also serves as National Youth Organizer to the National Democratic Congress party

== Early life and education ==
George Opare-Addo was born in Nima in the Greater Accra Region of Ghana. He had his primary school education with Achimota Primary School and had his secondary school education at Adisadel College (1997-1999).

He obtained a degree in Psychology and Philosophy B.A from the UG in Legon . He has a master degree in Governance from the Ghana Institute of Management and Public Administration. He also holds an LLB from the Ghana Institute Of Management and Public Administration (GIMPA). He holds a Qualifying Certificate in Law (QCL).

== Early career ==
After completing his undergraduate studies at the University of Ghana in 2005, George Opare-Addo joined the IGIT Group of Companies as a National Service Personnel. He rose through the ranks to become a manager by 2009, overseeing business strategy, budget management, and staff development. In 2009, he was appointed Municipal Chief Executive (MCE) of the Akuapem North Municipal Assembly, where he served until 2017. In this capacity, he represented central government interests at the local level, presided over municipal security council meetings, and directed day-to-day administrative functions. During this period, Opare-Addo also contested as the National Democratic Congress (NDC) Parliamentary Candidate for the Okere Constituency in 2008 and 2012.

== Political career ==
=== First Minister for Youth Development and Empowerment ===
George Opare-Addo began his political journey by serving as the Municipal Chief Executive (MCE) for the Akuapem North Municipal Assembly from 2009 to 2017, representing the central government in local economic development and presiding over municipal security council meetings. He contested as the National Democratic Congress (NDC) Parliamentary Candidate for the Okere Constituency in 2008 and 2012, providing financial and logistical support while working to expand the party's membership base in the region. In October 2018, he became the National Youth Organizer of the NDC, a position he held through December 2022 and continues to serve in. In this capacity, he offers strategic leadership to the party's Youth Wing, oversees research and advocacy efforts, and coordinates fundraising initiatives aligned with the party's social justice ideals. He is currently the first appointed Minister to oversee the affairs of the National Youth Development and Empowerment.

== External links and sources ==
- George Opare-Addo, ESQ: Minister for Youth Development and Empowerment
