= Nkoranza South (Ghana parliament constituency) =

Constituency in the Bono East Region of Ghana

Nkoranza South District
- constituency for the Parliament of Ghana
- District: Nkoranza South District
- Region: Bono East Region of Ghana

Current constituency
- Party: National Democratic Congress
- MP: Emmanuel Kwadwo Agyekum

Nkoranza South is one of the constituencies represented in the Parliament of Ghana. It elects one Member of Parliament (MP) by the first past the post system of election.

Emmanuel Kwadwo Agyekum is the member of parliament for the constituency. He was elected on the ticket of the National Democratic Congress. He had also represented the constituency in the 4th Republic parliament.

== See also ==
- List of Ghana Parliament constituencies
