= World Vision Ghana =

Ghanaian NGO

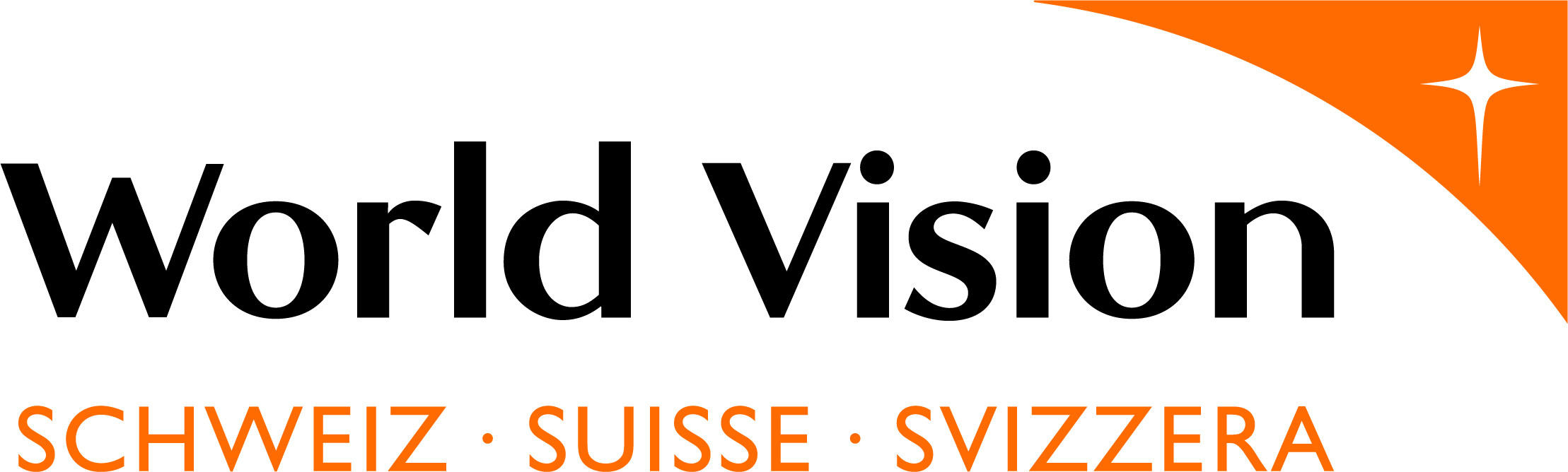
World Vision logo

World Vision Ghana is a non governmental organization in Ghana focused on relief, development and advocacy. It was formed in 1979 through its Community Development programs in each region in Ghana. In 1992, World Vision Ghana modified its approach to Area Development Programme which comprises communities and districts leading to a phase out of Community Development projects in 1998.

== History ==
World Vision Ghana is an affiliate of World Vision International. Ghana's branch named as World Vision Ghana focuses on community empowerment, such as building of schools, providing portable drinking water and ensuring the wellbeing of children in Ghana.

World Vision Ghana works closely with institutions such as Churches, District Assemblies, Non Governmental Organizations (NGOs), youth groups, women groups and other religious faith-based groups.

== Programs ==
Activities include; Education: inaugurates a 6 unite classroom it Oti Region in Ghana and also support children back to school.,

Health: helping the government of Ghana in fighting against COVID-19

Fighting against poverty: World Vision Ghana gives deprived students bicycles to curb absenteeism

providing portable drinking water and fighting against injustice.
