= Zanetor Agyeman-Rawlings =

Ghanaian politician and doctor (b. 1978)

Hon. Zanetor Agyeman-Rawlings MP
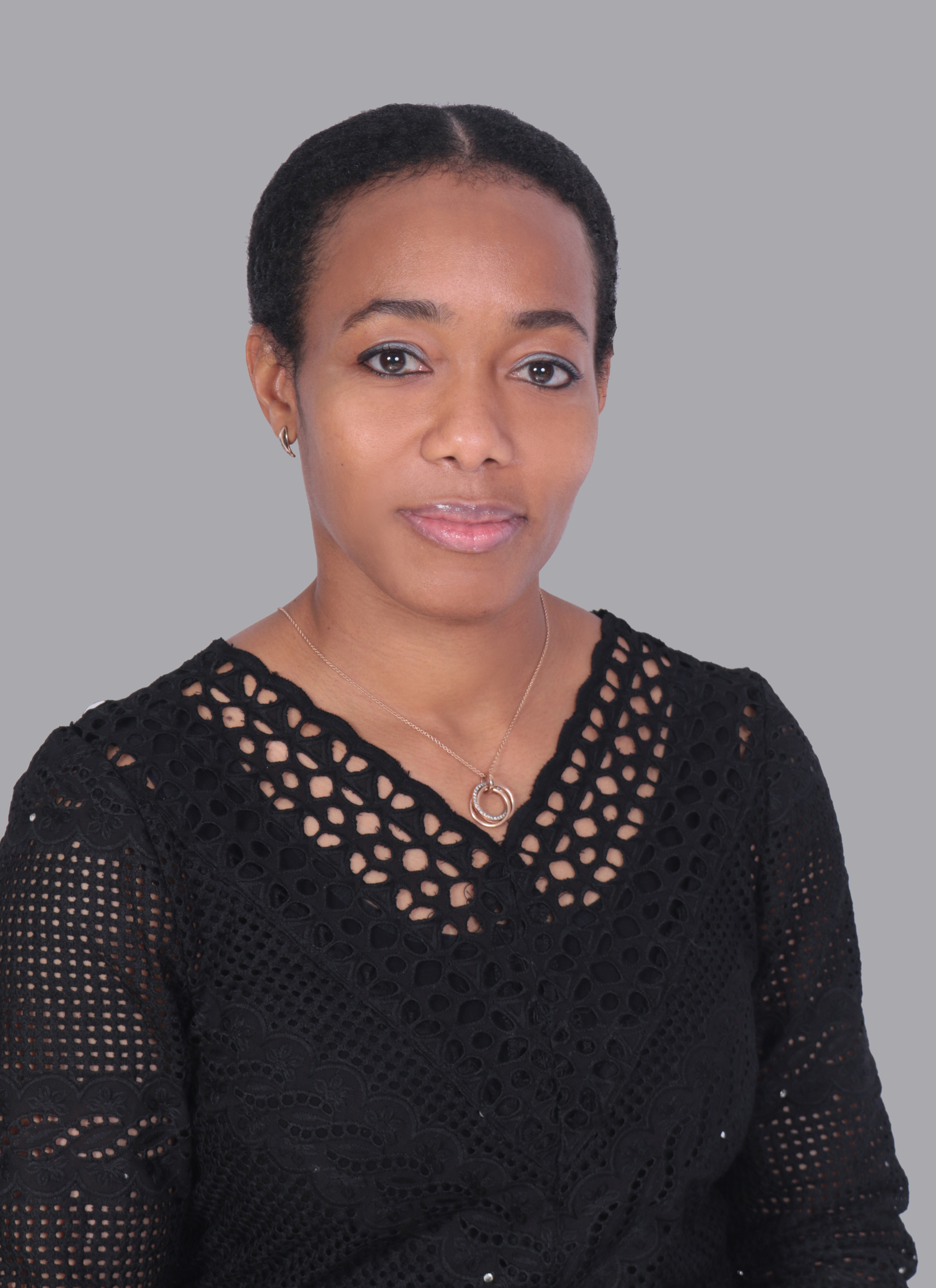

Member of the Ghana Parliament for Klottey-Korle Constituency
- Incumbent
- Assumed office January 2017
- Preceded by: Nii Armah Ashitey

Minister of Environment, Science, Technology and Innovation
- Incumbent
- Assumed office 29 August 2026
- President: John Dramani Mahama
- Preceded by: Ibrahim Murtala Muhammed

Personal details
- Born: Zanetor Agyeman-Rawlings; 1 June 1978 (age 48) Accra, Ghana
- Party: National Democratic Congress
- Children: 3
- Parent(s): Jerry John Rawlings; Nana Konadu Agyeman-Rawlings
- Education: Wesley Girls' Senior High School
- Profession: Medical doctor

Zanetor Agyeman-Rawlings (born 1 June 1978) is a Ghanaian medical doctor, politician, activist, and campaigner who is the eldest daughter of the 1st President under the 4th Republic of Ghana Jerry Rawlings (1993–2001) and first lady Nana Konadu Agyeman (1993–2001). She is National Democratic Congress' Member of Parliament for the Klottey-Korle Constituency in the 7th, 8th and the 9th parliament of the 4th Republic of Ghana and a humanitarian.

== Early life and education ==
Agyeman-Rawlings was born on 1 June 1978 in Accra. She hails from Dzelukope in the Volta Region. She attended the North Ridge Lyceum school and Achimota School for her basic education. She then graduated from the Wesley Girls High School in Cape Coast in 1996.

With her father being a political leader, as a child, Zanetor spent most of her time with her mother, Nana Konadu Agyeman Rawlings. Zanetor attended the Royal College of Surgeons in Ireland for her medical degree. She also has certificates in defense management and conflict and crisis management from the Ghana Armed Forces Command and Staff College. She also holds a master's degree certificate in Conflict, Peace and Security (EMCPS) from the Kofi Annan International Peacekeeping Training Centre (KAIPTC). She also has certificates in Women, Peace and Security from London School of Economics, Political Advisor in Peace Support Operations and Elections Observer all from KAIPTC. She also has a certificate in Counter Terrorism and Counter-Improvised Explosive Device from Ghana Armed Forces Command and Staff College.

== Career ==
=== Medical career ===
Agyeman-Rawlings worked as a medical doctor in general practice early in her career. She has participated in various foundations and initiatives championing women's and children's rights and improving sanitation in Ghana.

== Humanitarian work ==
As a humanitarian, Agyemang Rawlings, has led many efforts to provide relief to victims of disasters. In June 2015, she led a team to donate relief items to victims of the Goil Oil fire and flood disaster which took the lives of about 150 Ghanaians and displaced many. She also built a bridge for the Osu Anorhor community which has helped reduce the issue of floods and easy transportation in the community. In March 2014, Rawlings was a special guest of the exceptional Meeting of African Women in the framework of the crans-Montana Forum on Africa and the South-South Cooperation in Dakhla, which was aimed at promoting a more humane and impartial world.

== Politics ==
Agyeman-Rawlings had remained outside the mainline political spotlight for most of her life. In June 2015, while she was serving as an Ambassador for TV3's fundraising campaign, "TV3 June 3 Disaster Support Fund", which was aimed at raising funds to support the victims of the 3 June flood and fire disaster, there were reports which suggested she was using her relief effort to launch a political campaign. She denied the reports, stating that her activities over the weeks were geared towards raising funds for the victims of the disaster.

== Parliamentary bid ==
On 11 September 2015, Agyeman-Rawlings filed her nomination papers to contest the Korle Klottey parliamentary primaries as a Member of Parliament, running against the then incumbent Korle Klottey MP Nii Armah Ashitey and Leeford Kpakpo Quarshie.

At the filing of her nominations, she maintained she had no prior political ambitions and her decision to contest was recent. Her involvement, according to her, was based on popular calls for political involvement, borne out of her cleaning campaign and other environmental activism. Her father, John Rawlings, endorsed her candidature and mounted platforms to campaign for her.

== Member of Parliament ==
She won 10 November 2015 primaries for Korley Klottey constituency in the Greater Accra Region and went on to win the seat in the 2016 Ghanaian general election. She retained her seat In the 2020 general elections. She serves on the Gender and Children Committee and Environment, Science and Technology Committee. She was re-elected member of parliament for the same constituency in the 2024 elections.

== Minister of Environment, Science and Technology ==
Agyeman-Rawlings was appointed Minister of Environment, Science and Technology in August 2026.

== Personal life ==
Zanetor Agyeman-Rawlings has three children. The father of her first child was an Irishman Kenneth Kennedy, whom she met while living in Ireland. Two of the three children are born to Mr. Herbert Mensah, an ex-sportsmen.

Parliament of Ghana
Preceded by Nii Armah Ashitey	MP for Korle Klottey; 2017–	Incumbent
