= Erich Otto Engel =

German entomologist

Erich Otto Engel (29 September 1866 – 11 February 1944) was a German entomologist, who specialised in Diptera.

He was a graphic artist and administrator of the Diptera collection in Zoologische Staatssammlung München.

== Selected works ==
- Engel, E. O. (1925) Neue paläarktische Asiliden (Dipt.). Konowia. 4, 189–194.
- Engel, E. O., & Cuthbertson A. (1934) Systematic and biological notes on some Asilidae of Southern Rhodesia with a description of a species new to science. Proceedings of the Rhodesia Scientific Association. 34,
- Engel, E.O. 1930. Asilidae (Part 24), in E. Lindner (ed.) Die Fliegen der Paläarktischen Region, vol. 4. Schweizerbart'sche, Stuttgart. 491 pp.
- Engel, E.O. 1938-1954 Empididae. in Lindner, E. (Ed.). Die Fliegen der Paläarktischen Region, vol.4, 28, 1–400.
- Engel, E. O., & Cuthbertson A. (1939). Systematic and biological notes on some brachycerous Diptera of southern Rhodesia. Journal of the Entomological Society of Southern Africa. 2, 181–185.
