= Haruna Iddrisu =

Ghanaian lawyer and politician

The Honourable Haruna Iddrisu MP

Member of the Ghana Parliament for Tamale South
- Incumbent
- Assumed office Jan 2005
- Preceded by: Position established

Minister for Education
- Incumbent
- Assumed office 22 January 2025
- President: John Mahama
- Preceded by: Yaw Osei Adutwum

Minority Leader in Parliament
- In office July 2017 – January 2023
- President: Nana Akufo-Addo
- Preceded by: Osei Kyei-Mensa-Bonsu (MP)
- Succeeded by: Cassiel Ato Forson (MP)

Minister for Employment and Labour Relations
- In office 16 July 2014 – 6 January 2017
- President: John Dramani Mahama
- Preceded by: Nii Armah Ashitey (MP)
- Succeeded by: Ignatius Baffour-Awuah (MP)

Minister for Trade and Industry
- In office Feb 2013 – 16 July 2014
- President: John Dramani Mahama
- Preceded by: Hanna Tetteh
- Succeeded by: Ekwow Spio-Garbrah

Minister for Communications
- In office Feb 2009 – Feb 2013
- President: John Evans Atta Mills
- Preceded by: Ben Aggrey Ntim
- Succeeded by: Edward Omane Boamah

Personal details
- Born: 8 September 1970 (age 56) Tamale, Ghana
- Party: National Democratic Congress
- Children: 3
- Education: University of Ghana
- Profession: Barrister

Haruna Iddrisu (born 8 September 1970) is a Ghanaian politician who is currently the Minister for Education of the Republic of Ghana. He is a member of the ninth Parliament of the Fourth Republic of Ghana representing Tamale South. A member of the National Democratic Congress, he served as Minority Leader in Ghana's Parliament from 2017 to 2023

He is a Dagomba by tribe, an indigenous tribe from northern Ghana, belonging to the larger Mole-Dagbon ethnic group.

== Early life and education ==
Haruna Iddrisu was born in 1970 at Tamale, Ghana.He started his early education at Kulikuli school. Iddrisu studied at the University of Ghana between 1993 and 1997 where he obtained B.A. (Hons) in Sociology. He was active in student politics and was the President of the National Union of Ghana Students during his final year. Iddrisu is also a barrister and has been a member of the Ghana Bar Association since 2002. He attended two secondary schools which are Navorongo senior high school and Tamale senior high school

== Political career ==
After being a student leader for years in his tertiary education, Iddrisu transitioned into mainstream national politics and rose to become the National Youth Organizer for the National Democratic Congress in 2002. He held that position for 8 years even whilst serving as Minister of Communications in the Attah Mills Government. Iddrisu stepped down from the position in 2010.

An investigative tracking project on public accountability by the Media Foundatio for West Africa confirmed that Iddrisu was among the minority of high-ranking leadership in the 8th Parliament of Ghana who maintained full compliance with the Public Office Holders Asset Declaration Act.

=== As a Member of Parliament ===
He stood for MP in the 2004 parliamentary election in the then newly formed Tamale South constituency. Iddrisu served as the Ranking Member of the Parliamentary Select Committee on Communications and also the Minority Spokesman on Communications in the Fourth Parliament when the National Democratic Congress, his party was in opposition.

He retained his seat in the 2008 parliamentary election by gaining 78.2% of the total votes cast. He again retained his seat in the 2012 parliamentary elections by getting 74.6% of the total votes cast.

Even though his party lost the Presidential Elections, Haruna retained his seat in the 2016 Elections and was selected to lead the minority caucus as the Minority Leader of the 7th Parliament of the 4th Republic in Ghana.

In January 2020, Haruna Iddrisu donated a CHPS compound to the Duunyin community in the Northern region of Ghana to provide healthcare services to the indigents of the community. During the elections that year, Even though, Iddrisu's party, the NDC, failed to recapture power from the NPP, he retained the Tamale South Constituency seat after winning by a landslide.

In January 2023, Haruna's reign as Minority Leader came to an end after the minority NDC changed its leadership in parliament, replacing Haruna with Ato Forson.

In May 2023, Haruna ran unopposed for the NDC Parliamentary primaries and won. In the history of Ghana's politics, he is the only incumbent MP to run for primaries unopposed for 4 consecutive times.

He subsequently won the 2024 Ghanaian general election sixth time as the member of parliament for Tamale South (Ghana parliament constituency) on the ticket of the National Democratic Congress (Ghana). He won the seat with 27,366 votes which represent 57.35% over Seidu Naa Salifu Be-Awuribe of the New Partriotic Party.

In February 2026, Haruna Iddrisu denied the authenticity of social media posters suggesting he intended to run for the National Democratic Congress (NDC) flagbearer position. His office stated that the posters were not from him or his team and emphasized that he remained focused on his duties as Minister for Education and Member of Parliament for Tamale South.

On 13 June 2026, Haruna Iddrisu attended the 22nd graduation ceremony of the Islamic University College Ghana (IUCG) as the Special Guest of Honour. During his speech, he encouraged students to always be truthful in every situation, drawing inspiration from a Hadith of the Holy Prophet.

At the same event, Iddrisu announced that he had set up a scholarship in memory of his late mother. He revealed that the overall best student of the year would receive this scholarship. He also personally gave 10,000 Ghana cedis to the best graduating student.

=== As Minister of State ===
He has held various positions in government, including Minister for Communications under the Mills and Mahama administrations, and Minister for Trade and Industry from 2014 to 2017. He was appointed the Minister for Employment and Labour Relations by President Mahama in July 2014. He was appointed minister for Education in January 2025 in John Mahama's second term as president. And in the same January 2025, the parliament of Ghana led by the deputy speaker confirmed his approval as the Minister for Education. He was sworn in with the other five ministers of state by President Mahama.

==== As Minister of Education ====
Haruna Iddrisu was appointed by the president of the republic of Ghana on 22 January 2025 following the immediate approval of the elected president, following the approval from the national parliament.

== Personal life ==
He is a married Muslim, has 3 children, and hails from the Northern Region of Ghana., Tamale. The family house is located at Bayanwaya, an area in the Tamale South Constituency.

== Football ==
Haruna Iddrisu is a football enthusiast. He plays the game on weekends mostly at Nobisco school Park and Tamale sports Stadium annex and holidays in his native town, Tamale. Iddrisu also owns the Ghana Premier League club, Karela United, and Division One side, Steadfast FC, a club that produced Leicester City's winger, Abdul Fatawu Issahaku. The English Premier League outfit reportedly paid 17 million Euros to secure Issahaku's services from Sporting CP. Haruna Iddrisu and his Steadfast Football Club earned 7.9 million Euros from the deal.

== See also ==
- List of Mills government ministers
- List of Mahama government ministers
- Tamale South constituency
- Data Protection Act, 2012 (Act 843) – Ghana

Parliament of Ghana
Preceded by First	Member of Parliament for Tamale South; 2005 – present	Incumbent
Political offices
Preceded by Ben Aggrey Ntim	Minister for Communication; 2009 – 2013	Succeeded by Edward Omane Boamah
Preceded by Hanna Tetteh	Minister for Trade and Industry; 2013 – 2014	Succeeded by Ekwow Spio-Garbrah
Preceded by Nii Armah Ashitey	Minister for Employment and Labour Relations; 2014 –2017	Succeeded by Ignatius Bafuor Awuah (MP)
Preceded by Yaw Osei Adutwum	Minister for Education; 2025 –present	Incumbent
