= Emmanuel Kwadwo Agyekum =

Ghanaian politician

Hon Emmanuel Kwadwo Agyekum
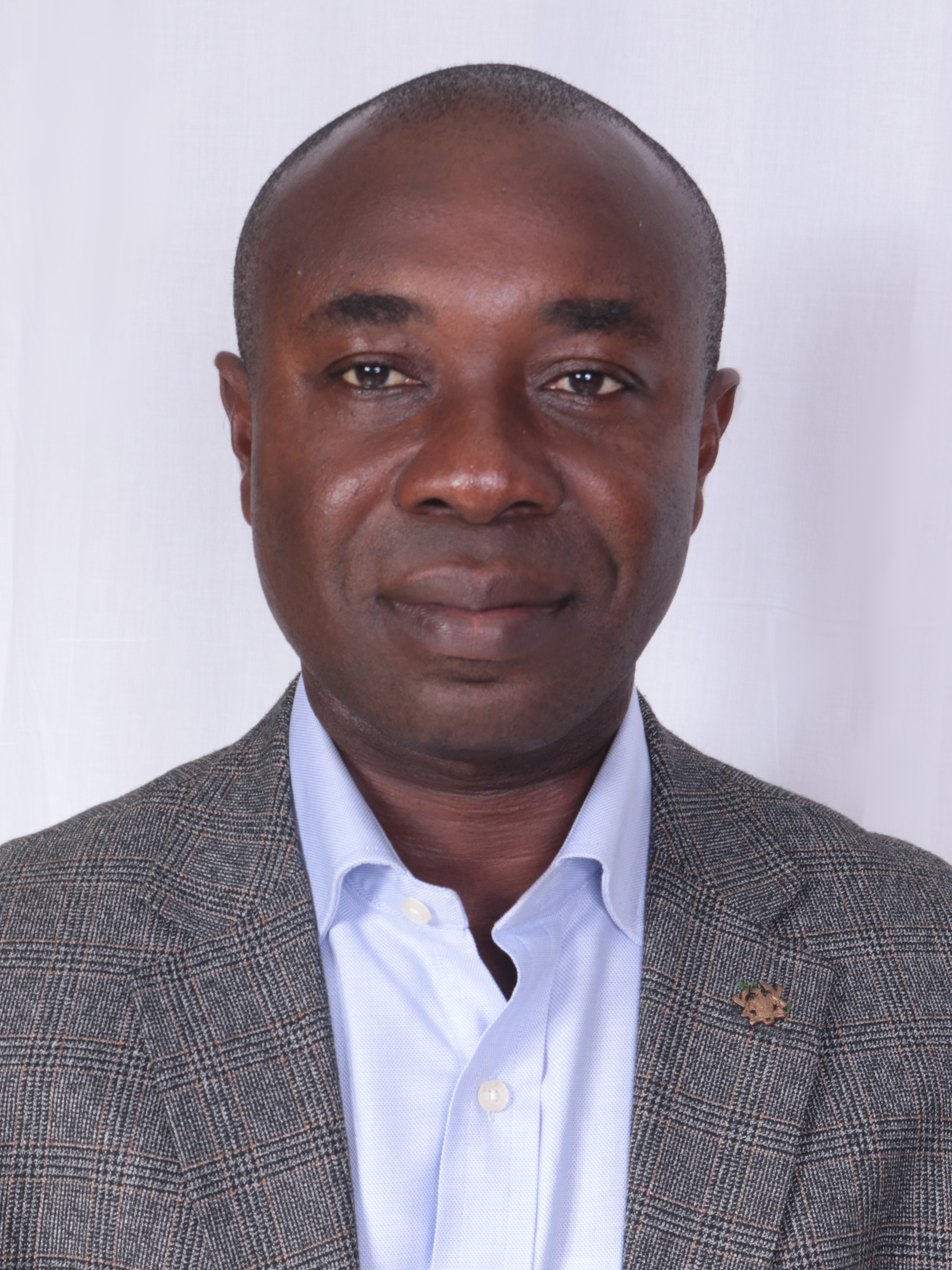

Member of the Ghana Parliament for Nkoranza South
- Incumbent
- Assumed office 7 January 2021

Personal details
- Born: Emmanuel Kwadwo Agyekum; 3 December 1973 (age 52) Nkoranza
- Party: National Democratic Congress
- Occupation: Politician
- Committees: Subsidiary Legislation Committee, Works and Housing Committee

Emmanuel Kwadwo Agyekum is a Ghanaian politician and a member of parliament for the Nkoranza South Constituency in the Bono East Region of Ghana. In May 2022, he alleged that the Ghana Police fired live bullets during the Nkoranza shooting and called on Ghanaians to stand against police brutality. He is currently the member of the 9th parliament.

== Personal life ==
Agyekum is a Seventh-day Adventist. He is married to Adwoa Santuo Agyekum.

== Early life and education ==
Born on 3 December 1973 in Nkoranza, Bono East Region, Ghana, Agyekum pursued higher education abroad. He obtained an MA in Global Business from the University of Westminster, London, in 2007. He also completed an International Master of Business Administration (IMBA) at the International Graduate Center and furthered his studies at the University of Applied Sciences in Bremen, Germany, in 2008.

== Political career ==
Agyekum is a member of the National Democratic Congress (NDC). He was first elected as the member of parliament for Nkoranza South after defeating the incumbent MP, Ampofo Twumasi of the New Patriotic Party (NPP). He served as the municipal chief executive (MCE) for Nkoranza South Municipality from January 2009 to January 2013. From 2013 to January 2017, he held the position of Deputy Minister of Local Government.

In the 2016 general elections, he lost his parliamentary seat to Charles Konadu-Yiadom of the NPP. However, he regained the seat in the 2020 elections, securing 29,408 votes (56.8%) against Konadu-Yiadom’s 22,219 votes (42.9%) and the People's National Convention (PNC) candidate Florence Ampour’s 121 votes (0.2%). He successfully retained his seat in the 2024 general elections.

=== Parliamentary committees ===
Agyekum serves as a member of the Subsidiary Legislation Committee and the Works and Housing Committee.

== Professional career ==
Before entering politics, Agyekum was the CEO of Special Care Recruitment Consultancy in London, United Kingdom. He later served as the municipal chief executive of Nkoranza South Municipality from May 2009 to January 2013.
