= Klottey Korle =

Constituency in Ghana

- constituency for the Parliament of Ghana
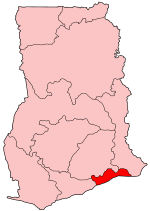
- District: Korle Klottey Municipal Assembly Municipal chief Executive Hon. Nii Adjei Tawiah
- Region: Greater Accra Region of Ghana

Current constituency
- Party: National Democratic Congress
- MP: Zanetor Agyeman-Rawlings

Klottey Korle is one of the constituencies represented in the Parliament of Ghana. It elects one Member of Parliament (MP) by the first-past-the-post system of election. The Klottey Korle constituency is located in the Greater Accra Region of Ghana.

The current Member of Parliament for the Klottey Korle Constituency is Dr. Zanetor Agyeman-Rawlings.

== Members of Parliament ==
First elected	MP	Party
1992	Nathan Tetteh Mensah	EGLE
1996	David Lamptey	National Democratic Congress
2000	Nii Adu Daku Mante	New Patriotic Party
2008	Nii Armah Ashietey	National Democratic Congress
2016	Zanetor Agyeman-Rawlings	National Democratic Congress

== Elections ==
2024 Ghanaian general election: Korle Klottey
Party	Candidate	Votes	%	±%
NDC	Zanetor Agyeman-Rawlings	39,997	62.78	—
NPP	Valentino Nii Noi Nortey	23,716	37.22	
Majority		16,281	25.56	—
Turnout		64,043	—	—
Registered electors				—

2020 Ghanaian general election: Korle Klottey
Party	Candidate	Votes	%	±%
NDC	Zanetor Agyeman-Rawlings	39,343	55.66	+5.37
NPP	Prince Appiah Debrah	31,154	44.07	+0.5
Liberal Party of Ghana	Fred Ntow Boateng	190	0.27	—
Majority		8,189	11.59	+4.87
Turnout		—	—	—
Registered electors		97,234		—

2016 Ghanaian general election: Korle Klottey
Party	Candidate	Votes	%	±%
NDC	Zanetor Agyeman-Rawlings	33,609	50.29	+1.74
NPP	Philip Kojo Addo Addison	29,122	43.57	−3.26
Independent	Nii Noi Nortey Valentino	3,911	5.85	—
CPP	Godwin Opare Addo	194	0.29	−0.26
Great Consolidated Popular Party	Joshua Kofi Brient Rockson	0	0.00	—
Majority		4,487	6.72	+5.00
Turnout		67,170	67.44	−11.43
Registered electors		99,603		—

2012 Ghanaian general election: Korle Klottey
Party	Candidate	Votes	%	±%
NDC	Nii Armah Ashietey	36,122	48.55	−2.05
NPP	Samuel Nii Adjei Tawiah	34,847	46.83	+0.83
Independent	Leeford Kpakpo Quarshie	1,354	1.82	—
PPP	Chris Bonaparte	1,151	1.55	—
CPP	Kabu Okai-Davies	408	0.55	−2.55
Independent	Godwin Opare-Addo	327	0.44	—
NDP	Charles Nii Otu Okunor	198	0.27	—
Majority		1,275	1.72	−2.58
Turnout		74,986	78.87	+11.87
Registered electors		95,067		—

2008 Ghanaian parliamentary election: Klottey Korle
Party	Candidate	Votes	%	±%
NDC	Nii Armah Ashietey	30,633	50.6	+5.0
NPP	Samuel J. Adjei Tawiah	28,011	46.3	−2.2
CPP	Monica Naa Ayao Quarcoopome	1,900	3.1	−1.4
Majority		2,622	4.3	+1.4
Turnout		60,320	67.0	−17.7
Registered electors		90,078		—

2004 Ghanaian general election: Korley Klottey
Party	Candidate	Votes	%	±%
NPP	Nii Adu Daku Mante	32,263	48.5	−3.2
NDC	Nii Armah Ashietey	30,351	45.6	+9.9
CPP	Godwin Opare-Addo	3,003	4.5	+0.4
People's National Convention	Richard Addo Buckman	910	1.4	+0.1
Majority		1,912	2.9	−13.1
Turnout		67,281	84.7	+24.3
Registered electors		79,464		

2000 Ghanaian general election: Korley Klottey
Party	Candidate	Votes	%	±%
NPP	Nii Adu Daku Mante	29,240	51.7	+24.07
NDC	David Lamptey	20,222	35.7	+2.358
United Ghana Movement	H. M. Nii Torgbor Cofie-Squire	2,717	4.8	—
CPP	Godwin Opare-Addo	2,298	4.1	—
National Reform Party	Emmanuel C. Gustav-Lartey	1,343	2.4	—
People's National Convention	U. Babamma Mohammed	747	1.3	—
Majority		9,018	16.0	—
Turnout		57,058	60.4	—
Registered electors		94,473		—

1996 Ghanaian general election: Korley Klottey
Party	Candidate	Votes	%	±%
NDC	David Lamptey	20,485	33.12	—
Independent	Tei Okunor	17,205	27.81	—
NPP	Gilbert K. Quartey	17,090	27.63	—
People's Convention Party	Adolf Lutterodt	4,897	7.92	—
Independent	Kwame Nyarko Akuffo-Mensah	2,173	3.51	—
Majority		3,280	5.31	—
Turnout		—	—	—
Registered electors		—		—

1992 Ghanaian parliamentary election: Korley Klottey
Party	Candidate	Votes	%	±%
EGLE	Nathan Tetteh Mensah	—	—	—
Majority				
Turnout				
Registered electors				

== See also ==
- List of Ghana Parliament constituencies
