= Duncan Campbell (soothsayer) =

Scottish soothsayer

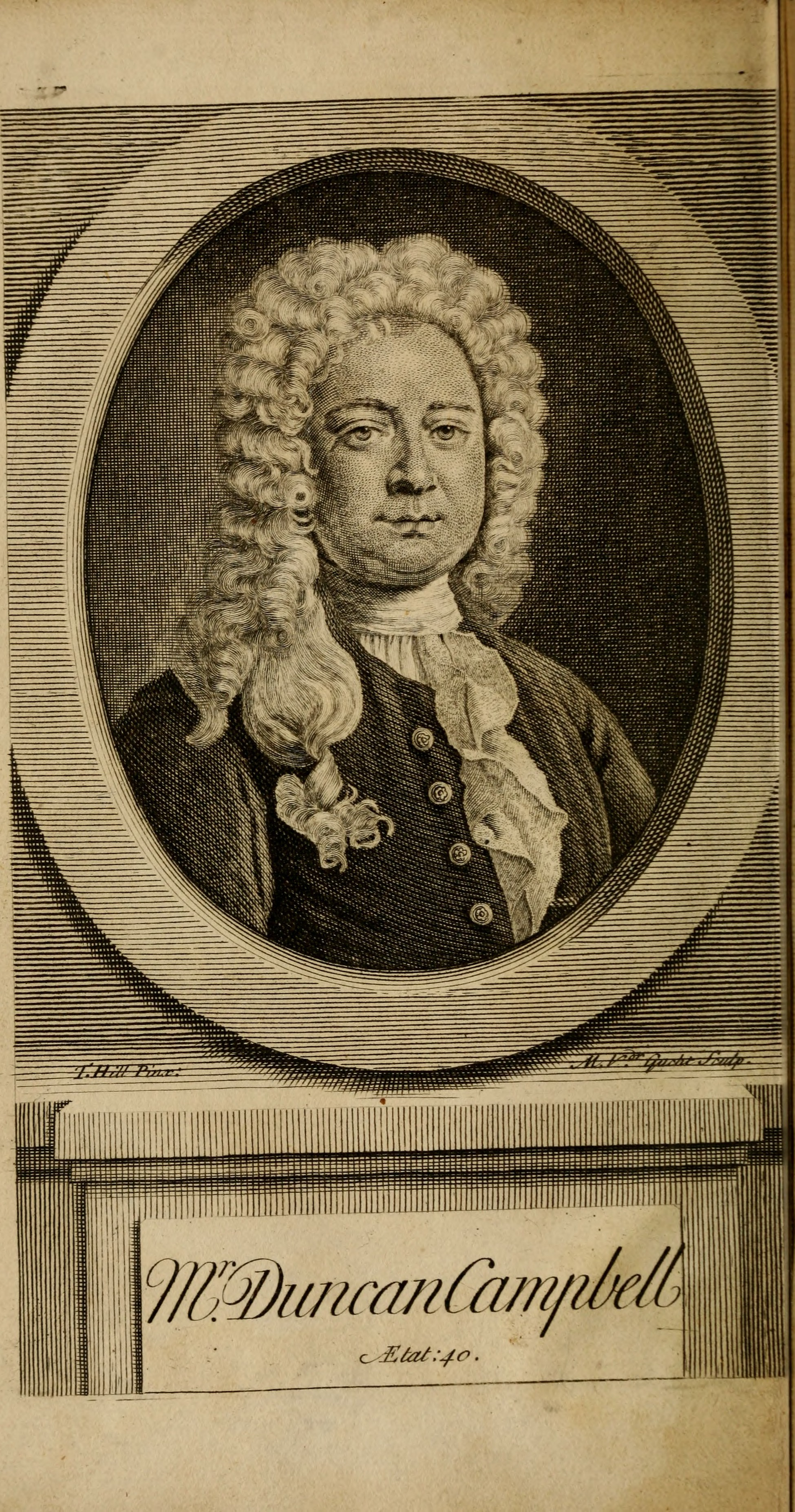
The history of the life and adventures of Mr. Duncan Campbell

Duncan Campbell (c. 1680–1730) was a Scottish deaf and mute man and professed soothsayer.

== Life ==
Campbell claimed he had been raised in Lapland, after his father became shipwrecked, whereupon he met Campbell's mother. Following the death of his mother, Campbell and his father moved to Scotland. This account has been questioned in later years, as Campbell may have manufactured his Lappish childhood to make his claims as a mystic more believable.

Campbell was born deaf and mute but learnt how to communicate at the University of Glasgow. He was taught fingerspelling using a method devised by John Wallis. Campbell went on to learn how to read and write.

In 1694, Campbell moved to London, where he began drawing attention for his predictions. Campbell claimed he had inherited the ability from his mother and used his powers by fall into a trance. Here, he would see the apparition of a boy with silver hair who wore a starry veil. The boy was accompanied by a lamb, wearing a collar adorned with nine bells. The boy would write his predictions in a book, ring a bell, and Campbell would awake from his trance.

By 1703, Campbell had run into debt and went to Rotterdam, where he enlisted as a soldier. He returned to London a few years later and began living in a house in Monmouth Street. It was here he began making a name for himself, with papers covering news of his predictions. Campbell was said to greet clients, writing down their names, or details of their lives, without first being introduced to them.

Campbell succeeded in obtaining the notice of royalty, as reporting in the 'Daily Post' of Wednesday, 4 May 1720: 'Last Monday Mr. Campbell, the deaf and dumb gentleman—introduced by Colonel Carr—kissed the king's hand, and presented to his majesty "The History of his Life and Adventures", which was by his majesty most graciously received.'

In 1726 Campbell appeared as a vendor of miraculous medicines. He published 'The Friendly Demon; It consists of two letters, the first by Duncan Campbell, giving an account of an illness which attacked him in 1717, and continued nearly eight years, until his good genius appeared and revealed that he could be cured by the use of the lodestone; the second on genii or familiar spirits, with an account of a marvellous sympathetic powder which had been brought from the East. A postscript informed the readers that at 'Dr. Campbell's house, in Buckingham Court, over against Old Man's Coffee House, at Charing Cross, they may be readily furnished with his "Pulvis Miraculosus", and finest sort of Egyptian loadstones.'

Throughout his life Campbell faced doubts from the public around his deafness. Individuals tried to prove that Campbell was faking his deafness in a variety of ways, including by slamming his fingers in a door, firing a pistol near his ear and by ordering drummers to march outside his place of work in an attempt to distract him. These attempts all failed and it was accepted by those close to Campbell that he was indeed deaf. He communicated to his wife and close friends with fingerspelling and hired a interpreter who travelled with him and was fluent in fingerspelling. When communicating with his clients, Campbell would write for them.

Campbell married and had two surviving children when he died following a severe illness in 1730.

== Literary references ==
'All his visitants,' says a writer in The Tatler No. 14, 'come to him full of expectations, and pay his own rate for the interpretations they put upon his shrugs and nods;' and he is referred to in The Spectator No. 560: 'Every one has heard of the famous conjuror who, according to the opinion of the vulgar, has studied himself dumb. Be that as it will, the blind Tiresias was not more famous in Greece than this dumb artist has been for some years last past in the cities of London and Westminster.'

Edmund Curll in 1720 published The History of the Life and Adventures of Mr. Duncan Campbell. It was probably written by William Bond; the traditional attribution to Daniel Defoe is now considered implausible.

On 18 June 1720, there appeared a pamphlet entitled Mr. Campbell's Pacquet.' This was edited by Bond; the third section of the pamphlet was written by Defoe (DNB). In 1724 there was published A Spy upon the Conjuror. This pamphlet was by Eliza Haywood. About a third of the pamphlet consists of letters— generally very amusing, sometimes of the most extraordinary character—written by Campbell's correspondents. The 1725 'The Dumb Projector; being a surprising account of a Trip to Holland made by Mr. Campbell, with the manner of his Reception and Behaviour there,' was also by Haywood.

An account of his life appeared in 1732, under the title 'Secret Memoirs of the late Mr. Duncan Campbell, the famous Deaf and Dumb Gentleman, written by himself, who ordered they should be published after his decease. To which is added an application by way of vindication of Mr. Duncan Campbell against the groundless aspersion cast upon him that he had pretended to be Deaf and Dumb.'
