= Love in Excess; or, The Fatal Enquiry =

Novel by Eliza Haywood

Love in Excess's title page

Love in Excess (1719–20) is Eliza Haywood's best known novel. It details the amorous escapades of Count D'Elmont, a rake who becomes reformed over the course of the novel. Love in Excess was a huge bestseller in its time, going through multiple reissues in the four years following its initial publication. It was once compared in terms of book sales with Gulliver's Travels and Robinson Crusoe. This information was later shown to be incorrect; the novel selling only about 6000 copies over 23 years.

== Summary ==
The first part of the novel details the rivalry between Alovisa and Amena, two upper-class young women, for the Count D'Elmont's attention. The narrator mentions the "custom which forbids women to make a declaration of their thoughts." This is important to both the plot and the theme of the novel. Alovisa writes an unsigned letter to D'Elmont. This inadvertently leads D'Elmont to court Amena instead. Amena's father refuses to allow his daughter to continue meeting with D'Elmont without a proposal of marriage. During one of their secret meetings, the pair are compromised by the intervention of Alovisa's servant, Charlo, who awakens Amena's household. Alovisa feigns desire to help the pair by allowing them to meet in her apartment; however, Alovisa colludes with Amena's father to ship Amena off to a convent in the countryside. D'Elmont, in the meanwhile, has left to receive his brother, Chevalier Brillian. During the course of their conversation, it is revealed that the Chevalier has fallen in love with Alovisa's sister Ansellina (who resides in Amiens).

Part the Second deals with D'Elmont's falling in "true" love with Melliora, a girl entrusted in his care. At the first sight of "the matchless Melliora", his "impregnable" heart "surrendered". The Baron D'Espernay, a close friend of D'Elmont, helps him plot to seduce Melliora—in part because he desires Alovisa for himself. D'Espernay plans a ball, during which D'Elmont is arranged to have access to Melliora, but Melantha, D'Espernay's sister, is enamored with D'Elmont and takes Melliora's room. When D'Elmont enters what he thinks is Melliora's chamber, he instead ravishes the too-willing Melantha. Alovisa, certain that D'Espernay can help her discover the identity of her husband's lover, agrees to trade sexual favors for this knowledge. In the chaos of the evening, Alovisa ends up running into D'Elmont's sword.

Part the Third commences with the aftermath of Alovisa's death; D'Elmont ends up in Italy, yearning endlessly for Melliora, while Melliora returns to the monastery where she was educated. Later, D'Elmont intervenes to rescue a stranger from certain death, killing a masked bravo, or "hired murderer", and narrowly escaping with his own life. To avoid being implicated, D'Elmont flees, stumbling into a garden belonging to his secret admirer. D'Elmont is confronted by Melliora's brother, Frankville, for tarnishing her reputation. Frankville is revealed to be the stranger whose life D'Elmont saved earlier on. Despite being affianced to Violetta (the chaste "good" woman), Frankville had fallen in love with a woman named Camilla, inciting the vengeance of Violetta's villainous father Cittolini, who is described as a "possessor of immense riches". D'Elmont attempts to assist Frankville by secretly delivering a letter to Camilla, who lives with Ciamara, the temptress who wrote to D'Elmont. Ciamara (the lusty "bad" woman) attempts to seduce D'Elmont when he mistakes her for Camilla, and this causes Frankville to spurn Camilla. Attempting to rectify this confusion, D'Elmont presents himself to Ciamara as a decoy long enough for Frankville to forcibly gain access to Camilla's quarters. But Camilla is unmoved by Frankville's pleading, and Frankville and D'Elmont narrowly escape an attack from Ciamara's servants. While Violetta was engaged to Frankville, she inevitably falls in love with D'Elmont and seeks to reunite Frankville and Camilla.

Receiving word that Melliora has been kidnapped from the monastery, and learning through Violetta of Ciamara and Cittolini's revenge plot, D'Elmont, Frankville, and Camilla flee Rome, accompanied by Fidelio, who is actually Violetta disguised as a pageboy. They learn that Ciamara had poisoned herself out of grief, and Violetta's vengeful father has also died. En route to Paris, the travelers—burdened by Fidelio who has fallen ill—take shelter from a storm with a wealthy gentleman, the Marquess D'Saguillier. D'Elmont is surprised in bed by Melliora, who reveals the events leading to her kidnapping: Betrothed to Melliora's friend, Charlotta, the Marquess instead desired Melliora and abducted her. Melliora secures her own freedom to leave with D'Elmont through an elaborate plot. Meanwhile, Fidelio is revealed to be Violetta, and she professes her undying love for D'Elmont on her deathbed. Violetta's fidelity is rewarded, as the Marquess D'Saguillier and Charlotta, Frankville and Camilla, and D'elmont and Melliora are wed. D'Elmont returns to Paris, where he is reunited with his brother. D'Elmont and Melliora are "still living, ... great and lovely examples of conjugal affection."

== Major themes ==
A work of amatory fiction, Love in Excess offers many models of female desire, and ultimately articulates the early-18th century "cultural shift toward a companionate model of marriage." Like Aphra Behn and Delarivier Manley, Haywood uses love triangles to illustrate the different roles women can play. Exploring the conflict between social expectations and individual desires, Haywood's novel illustrates how female desire is silenced by public norms. According to David Oakleaf, Haywood "laments that women cannot, like men, express their desire directly". Although Love in Excess is known for its female characters, Count D'Elmont is also an important character. Count Delmont is a "male version" of women who inspire sexual desire but are indifferent to their admirers.

== Publication history ==
Love in Excess, one of Haywood's' first and most popular novels, was published in three parts, by William Chetwood. Between 1719 and 1742 the novel was printed in six editions. Holly Luhning explains the publication history of Love in Excess, which was one of the most successful popular novels in the eighteenth century, through the prefatory poems. In the first part of the book, Chetwood included a dedicatory letter by the famous actress Anne Oldfield, instead of indicating that Haywood was the author. However, her name appeared in the second part and the third parts of her novel. In addition to this dedicatory letter, Chetwood also included several prefatory poems. The poems flatter Haywood's narrative skills and her ability to present "the power of physical and emotional love". The poems that were published in the early editions praised Love in Excess, but in the 6th edition, they also noticed Haywood's body of work, suggesting her higher reputation as a writer. Positive reaction to her work influenced more women to publish.
