= D. C. K. Amenu =

Ghanaian military officer

Brigadier D. C. K. Amenu
- Occupation: military officer Chief of Army Staff
- Term: November 1968 to August 1969

Brigadier D. C. K. Amenu was a Ghanaian military officer and a former Chief of Army Staff of the Ghana Army. He served as Chief of Army Staff from November 1968 to August 1969.
