= Ibrahim Murtala Muhammed =

Ghanaian politician (1974–2025)

The Honourable Ibrahim Murtala Muhammed MP
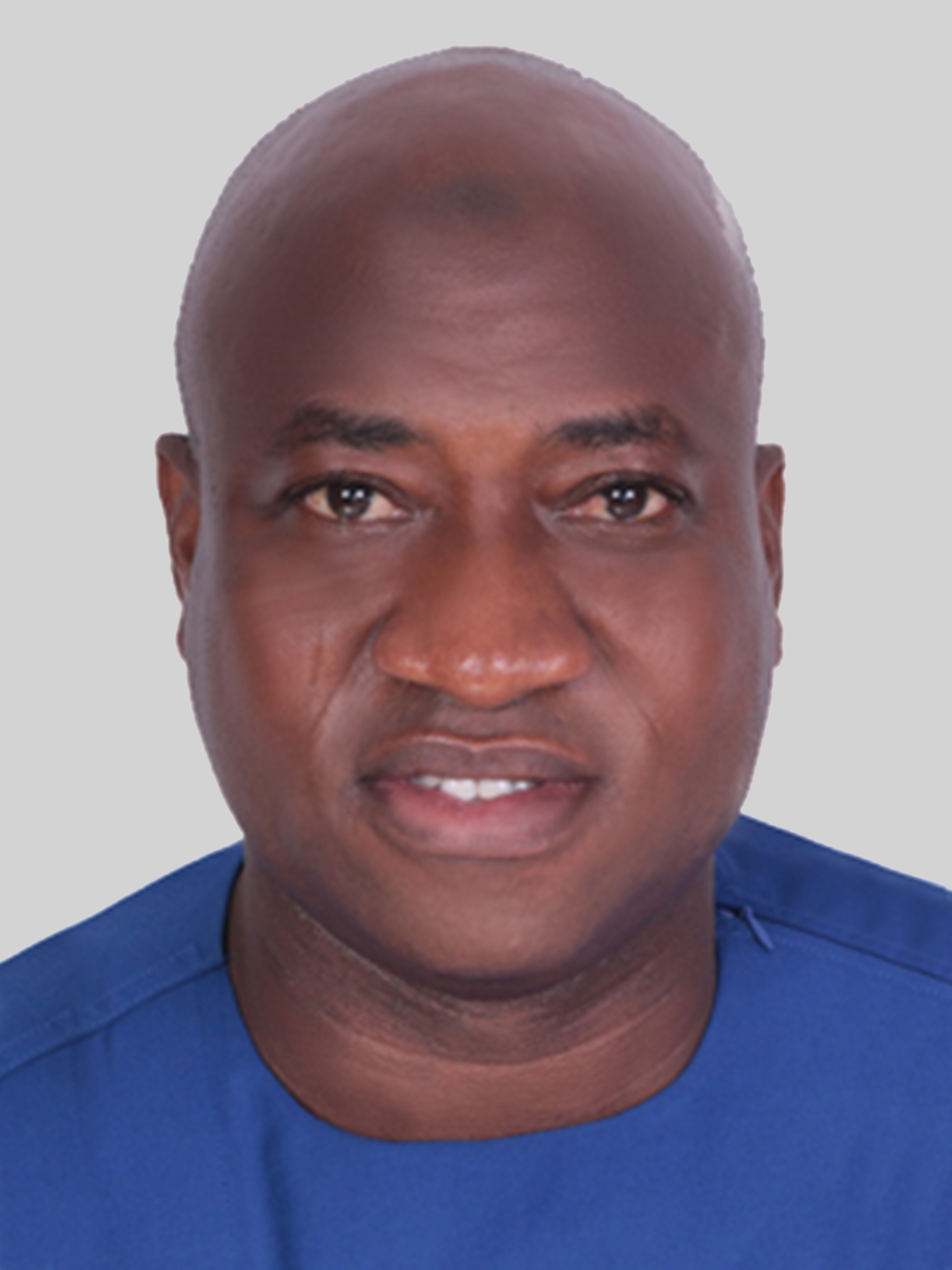
- Muhammed in 2021

Minister for Environment, Science, Technology and Innovation
- In office February 2025 – 6 August 2025
- President: John Mahama
- Preceded by: Kwaku Afriyie
- Succeeded by: Vacant

Deputy Minister for Trade and Industry
- In office 16 July 2014 – 6 January 2017 Serving with Kweku George Ricketts-Hagan
- President: John Mahama
- Minister: Ekwow Spio-Garbrah
- Preceded by: Edwin Nii Lante Vanderpuye
- Succeeded by: Carlos Kingsley Ahenkorah

Deputy Minister for Information
- In office March 2013 – 16 July 2014 Serving with Felix Kwakye Ofosu
- President: John Mahama
- Minister: Mahama Ayariga
- Preceded by: Samuel Okudzeto Ablakwa
- Succeeded by: Felix Kwakye Ofosu

Member of Parliament
- In office 7 January 2021 – 6 August 2025
- Preceded by: Inusah Fuseini
- Succeeded by: Alidu Mahama Seidu
- Constituency: Tamale Central
- In office 2013 – 6 January 2017
- Preceded by: Iddrisu Abdul-Kareem
- Succeeded by: Mohammed Hardi Tufeiru
- Constituency: Nanton

Personal details
- Born: 14 December 1974 Tamale, Ghana
- Died: 6 August 2025 (aged 50) Adansi District, Ashanti Region, Ghana
- Party: NDC
- Education: University of Ghana (BA, MA, PhD); Kwame Nkrumah University of Science and Technology (MSc); Mountcrest University College (LLB)
- Occupation: Politician; development planner

Ibrahim Murtala Muhammed (14 December 1974 – 6 August 2025) was a Ghanaian politician who served as the Minister of Environment, Science, Technology and Innovation and as a member of parliament until his death in the 2025 Ghanaian Air Force helicopter crash.

He previously served as the Deputy Minister for Information and Media Relations and the Deputy Minister of Trade and Industry. In December 2024, he was re-elected to serve as Member of Parliament for Tamale Central Constituency.

== Early life and education ==
Muhammed Murtala began his basic education at Tamale Presby Basic School (Kulikuli School) before enrolling at Ghana Senior High School in Tamale. He was a trained teacher who held a teacher's certificate A from Tamale College of Education (TACE), formerly Tamale training College (TATCO). He also held a master's degree in Development Planning and International Relations and Diplomacy from the Kwame Nkrumah University of Science and Technology and the University of Ghana respectively.

== Political career ==
In 2009, after a change of political power from the NPP to NDC, Muhammed was appointed the deputy national coordinator of the National Youth Employment Program (NYEP) by John Evans Atta Mills which was later rebranded into Ghana Youth Employment Development Agency, (GYEDA).

=== Member of Parliament ===
In 2006, following the decision by Wayo Seini, MP for Tamale Central constituency to defect to the NPP, a by-election was declared to fill the vacancy. Muhammed stood for the NDC primaries but lost to Inusah Fuseini who eventually won the by-election to replace Wayo Seini. Muhammed contested his party's primaries in 2008 and lost again to Fuseini who went on to retain his position in Parliament. Muhammed went on to contest for the primaries in the Nanton Constituency and this time, he won to represent the NDC as its Parliamentary candidate for the 2012 election.

==== 2012 Parliamentary elections ====
Muhammed served as a member of parliament for the Nanton Constituency in the sixth Parliament of the Fourth Republic of Ghana. In December 2012, he won the parliamentary election to represent the Nanton constituency by garnering 10,369 votes representing 52.66% of the total votes cast against his closest contender who was the incumbent member of parliament, Abdul-Kareem Iddrisu who got 8,667 votes representing 44.02%.

==== 2016 Parliamentary elections ====
In 2016, after serving one term in parliament, he lost his bid to be re-elected as member of parliament to Mohammed Hardi Tuferu. Tuferu garnered 11,346 votes representing 51.84% against Muhammed's 10,451 votes representing 47.75% of the votes cast. Ahead of the elections, Muhammed was heard publicly accusing an NDC MP in the northern region of plotting to unseat him.

==== 2020 Parliamentary elections ====
After the member of parliament for Tamale Central Inusah Fuseini decided not to seek re-election in the 2020 elections, Muhammed contested his Party's parliamentary primaries. In August 2019, he won the primaries after getting 737 votes against his two contenders Alhassan Adam and Abdul Hanan Gundado who got 181 votes and 319 votes respectively. He went on to win the main election, securing his return to parliament as MP for Tamale Central by obtaining 41,156 votes while the New Patriotic Party's (NPP) Ibrahim Anyars got 33,699 votes. In Parliament, Muhammed was a member of the Public Accounts Committee and Trade and Industry committees.

==== 2024 parliamentary election ====
In December 2024, he won the parliamentary election on the ticket of the NDC to represent Tamale Central by securing 52,263 votes while his opponent had 16,647 votes. He retained the seat as MP for Tamale Central.

== As a minister of State ==
In March 2013, John Mahama appointed Muhammed as Deputy Minister for Information and Media Relations and subsequently Trade and Industry under the John Mahama government from between 2013 and 2017. After serving in that capacity for a year, the Ministry of Information and Media Relations and the Ministry of Communications were merged and Muhammed was moved along with Kweku Rickets-Hagan to serve as deputy ministers under new Trade and Industry Minister, Ekwow Spio Garbrah. He served in this role until his party lost the 2016 elections and handed over government to the New Patriotic Party in January 2017.

In January 2025, President John Mahama appointed Murtala as the substantive Minister for Environment, Science and Technology. He assumed office on 12 February upon his approval by the president.

== Personal life ==
Muhammed was a Muslim and was married with three children.

=== Death ===
On 6 August 2025, Muhammed died in a military helicopter crash while travelling to Obuasi, in the Ashanti Region, for an event to combat galamsey (illegal mining). He was aboard a Ghana Armed Forces Z-9 helicopter that went down in the Adansi Akrofuom District. The crash killed all eight people on board, including the Minister of Defence, Edward Omane Boamah, Acting Deputy National Security Coordinator Limuna Mohammed Muniru, and NDC Vice Chairman Samuel Sarpong. He was buried on 10 August 2025. He and other victims of the crash were accorded a state funeral in Accra on 15 August that was attended by President John Mahama.
