= Mohammed Amin Adam =

Ghanaian politician and economist

Hon Mohammed Amin Adam
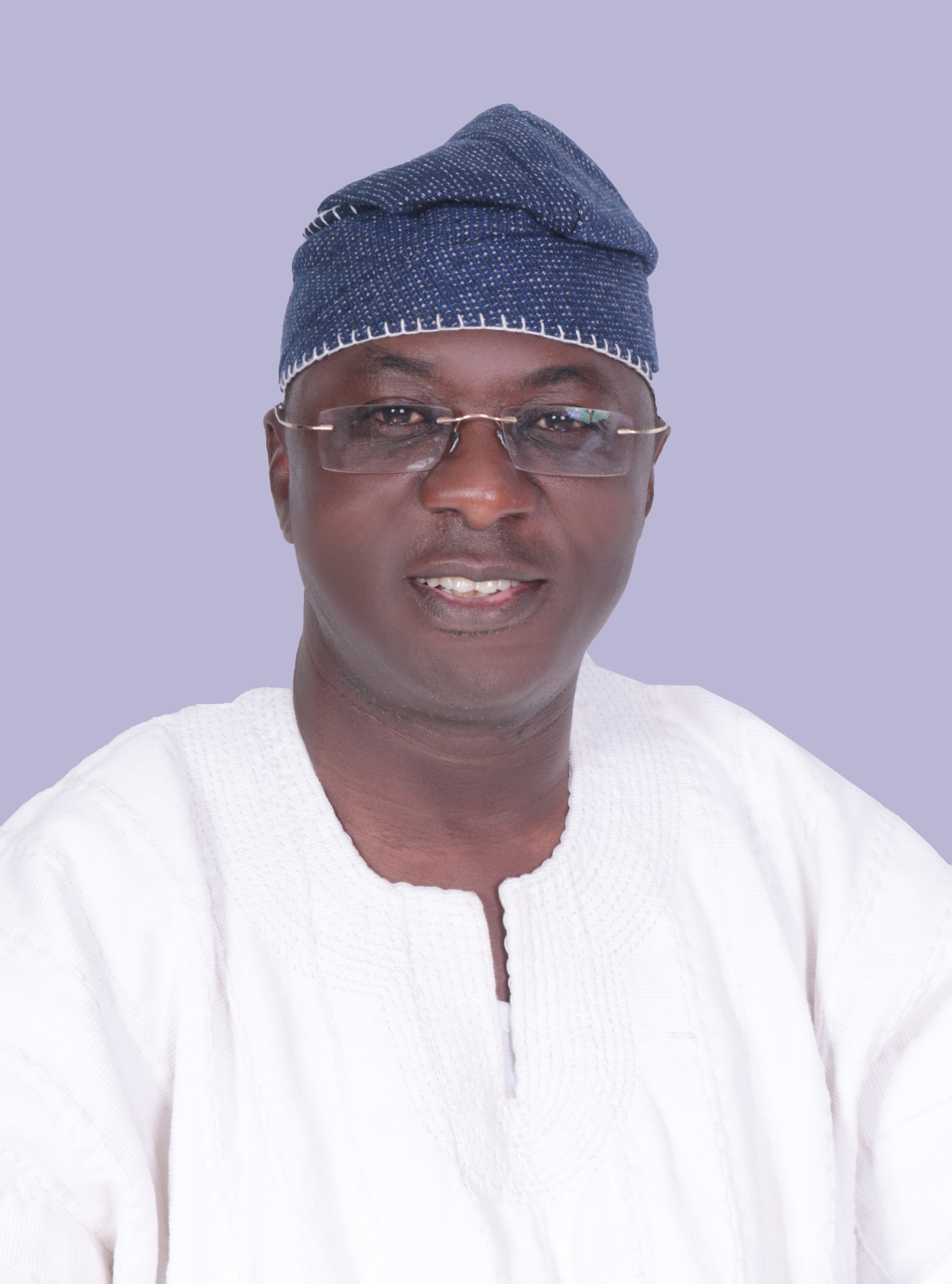

Member of the Ghana Parliament for Karaga
- Incumbent
- Assumed office 7 January 2021

Minister for Finance and Economic Planning
- In office 14 February 2024 – January 2025
- President: Nana Akufo-Addo
- Preceded by: Ken Ofori-Atta
- Succeeded by: Cassiel Ato Forson

Personal details
- Born: Mohammed Amin Adam; 15 April 1974 (age 52) Tamale
- Party: New Patriotic Party
- Occupation: Politician
- Committees: Finance Committee, Defence and Interior Committee

Mohammed Amin Adam (born April 15, 1974) is a Ghanaian politician who served as the Minister of Finance from February 2024 to January 2025. He is popularly referred to as Amin Anta.

Adam previously served as the Deputy Minister for Energy, with responsibility for the petroleum sector. He is the member of parliament for Karaga Constituency in the Northern Region of Ghana on the ticket of the New Patriotic Party and part of the majority in the 8th parliament of the Fourth Republic of Ghana. Prior to becoming the Deputy Minister for Energy, he was the Founder and executive director of the Africa Centre for Energy Policy. Previously, he served as the mayor of the city of Tamale in the year 2005, deputy minister for Northern Region of Ghana, and Minister of State in charge of for Finance.

== Educational background ==
Amin Adam attended the Northern School of Business (Nobisco) in Tamale from 1988 to 1991 and Tamale Secondary School (now Tamale Senior High School) from 1991 to 1993. He has a B.A (Hons) in Economics and an M.Phil. in Economics from the University of Cape Coast. He holds a Ph.D. in Petroleum Economics from the Centre for Energy, Petroleum & Mineral Law, and Policy at the University of Dundee in the United Kingdom, specializing in petroleum fiscal policy in resource-led economies and resource governance. Additionally, he is a fellow of the Institute of Certified Economists of Ghana. He has undertaken professional development trainings at Columbia University, University of Texas at Austin, and Harvard University in the US.

== Political career ==
Adam is a member of the New Patriotic Party (NPP). He began his involvement in politics at a young age. His interest in politics earned him the nickname 'political Anta' while at Nobisco. During his days at the University of Cape Coast, he was the secretary of TESCON. In 1998, he was elected the national secretary and later national president of the National Union of Students.

He contested as the parliamentary candidate of the NPP for Chogu Tishegu Constituency in 2000 but lost to Abubakari Sumani. In 2004, he was elected to contest as the NPP parliamentary candidate for the Tamale Central Constituency, he lost to Alhassan Wayo Seini of the NDC.

President John Kufour appointed him as the Deputy Northern regional minister in 2005 and later the Mayor of Tamale.

He founded and served as executive director of the Africa Centre for Energy Policy (ACEP) before taking on the position of Deputy Minister of Energy in 2017. In addition, he held a number of other posts in public and private organizations, including those of Africa Coordinator for Ibis' extractives industries, Commissioner of the Ghana Public Utilities Regulatory Commission, and Energy Policy Analyst at the Ministry of Energy in Ghana.

Adam was appointed by President Nana Akufo-Addo as Minister of Finance on February 14, 2024, after Ken Ofori-Atta was relieved of his duties after seven years.

== Finance Minister ==
=== Completion of the Kumasi International Airport ===
Shortly after assuming office, Amin Anta released a tranche of seven million euros for the completion of the Kumasi International Airport.

On July 23, 2024, Amin Adam, presented the country's mid-year fiscal policy review of the 2024 budget statement and economic policy to Parliament, fulfilling one of the major tasks of the Finance Minister's position.

== Other activities ==
- African Development Bank (AfDB), Ex-Officio Member of the Board of Governors (since 2024)
- ECOWAS Bank for Investment and Development (EBID), Ex-Officio Member of the Board of Governors (since 2024)
- Multilateral Investment Guarantee Agency (MIGA), World Bank Group, Ex-Officio Member of the Board of Governors (since 2024)
- World Bank, Ex-Officio Member of the Board of Governors (since 2024)

== Philanthropy ==
=== Tamale Teaching Hospital ===
Anta donated 10 water tanks to enhance water storage capacity at the Tamale Teaching Hospital. He also donated three dialysis machines and an amount of GHC 200,000 for the refurbishment of a defunct underground tank.

=== Aboabo and Zogbeli Educational Fund ===
Anta donated a one million Ghana Cedis seed amount for the establishment of an educational fund for Aboabo, a suburb of Tamale, Ghana. He also donated a five hundred thousand Ghana Cedis for an educational fund for Zogbeli. As MP, Amin Adam has established the Anta Education Fund to support brilliant-but-needy students in his constituency. The fund has since benefitted over 300 students. In August 2024, he donated two brand new Mitsubishi pick-up vehicles to the 6 Infantry Battalions of the Ghana Armed Forces. Amin Adam said, at a short ceremony held at Kamina Barracks in Tamale to handover the vehicles to the Military High Command, his gesture was meant to resource the army to facilitate their swift response to disturbances.

=== Tamale Secondary School ===
Anta on Monday, November 17, 2025, commissioned a 12-unit classroom block for his alma mater, Tamale Senior High School, as his way of appreciating the school for shaping his future. He also used the opportunity to speak to the students against drug and substance abuse.

== Ambariya Islamic Institute ==
Dr Mohammed Amin Adam (Anta) has commissioned and handed over a newly constructed 300-bed hostel facility to the Ambariya Islamic School, strengthening support for Islamic education in Northern Ghana. The project responds to a request from the leadership of the Ambariya Islamic Institute to ease accommodation challenges faced by students who travel from communities outside Tamale.

== Personal life ==
Adam is married to Rashida Adam. Adam is a Muslim.
