= Alidu Mahama Seidu =

Ghanaian politician and senior lecturer

Member of Parliament for Tamale Central
- Incumbent
- Assumed office 23 September 2025
- Preceded by: Ibrahim Murtala Mohammed

Personal details
- Born: May 24, 1980 (age 46) Tamale, Northern Region, Ghana
- Party: National Democratic Congress
- Education: MSc, Development Studies, LSE; PhD, Political Science and Governance, Leeds Metropolitan University
- Alma mater: University of Ghana
- Occupation: Politician, Senior Lecturer
- Profession: Lecturer, Executive Secretary (Water Resources Commission)
- Known for: Ghanaian politics, academic research

Alidu Mahama Seidu is a Ghanaian politician and a senior lecturer at the University of Ghana. He is a member of the National Democratic Congress (NDC) and the Member of Parliament for Tamale Central. He was declared winner of the constituency's seat on 23 September 2025, succeeding Ibrahim Murtala Mohammed, the former MP and Minister for Environment, Science, Technology and Innovation.Alidu Seidu was sworn into the 9th parliament on October 21, 2025.

== Early life and education ==
Alidu Seidu was born in Tamale in the Northern Region of Ghana. He was born on Saturday, 24th May,1980.

He had his Secondary School Certificate Examination (SSSCE) at Ghana Secondary School, now Ghana Senior High school. He studied Political Science at the University of Ghana, where he obtained a Bachelor of Arts with Honours between August 2000 and July 2004. He later travelled to the United Kingdom, enrolling at the London School of Economics and Political Science (LSE) and completed a Master of Science in Development Studies from September 2005 to July 2010. From January 2007 to July 2010, he pursued and earned a Doctor of Philosophy (PhD) in Political Science and Governance at Leeds Metropolitan University.

== Career ==
Seidu was appointed Executive Secretary of the Water Resources Commission by President John Dramani Mahama. He also serves as a Senior Lecturer in Political Science at the University of Ghana.

== Publications/Research Output ==
=== Peer Reviewed Journals ===
- Alidu, S., and Aggrey-Darkoh, E., (2018) “Rational Voting in National Elections: the 2012 and 2016 Elections in Perspective” Ghana Social Science Journal, 15(1), pp.98-121
- Debrah, E., Alidu, S., and Owusu-Mensah, I. (2016) “The Cost of Inter-ethnic conflict Northern Region: the case of the Nawuri-Gonja Conflicts” Journal of African Conflicts and Peace Studies, Vol. 3, Issue, 1, pp. 1-29
- Alidu, S., and Gyekye-Jandoh, M. (2016) “Civil Society and Democratic Governance in Ghana: Emerging roles and challenges” Contemporary Journal of African Development, Vol. 4, No. 1, pp. 1-26
- Alidu, S., Dankyi, E., and Tsiboe-Darko, A. (2016) Ageing policies in Ghana: a review of the Livelihood Empowerment against Poverty and the National Health Insurance Scheme, Ghana Studies, Volume 19, pp. 154-172
- Alidu, S., and Braimah, A. (2014). Ghana‟s Peaceful Election 2012: a Lesson for Africa? International Journal of Sciences: Basic and Applied Research, 18(2): 177-187
- Alidu, S., (2014). Party Politics and Electoral Malpractices in Ghana‟s Election 2012. Journal of Scientific Research and Report, 3(11):1449-1464.
- Alidu, S., and Asare, B. (2014). Challenges of Civil Society Networks in Ghana: A Comparative Study of Four Networks. British Journal of Economic, Management and Trade, 4(7): 1143-1158
