= Alhassan Sualihu Dandaawa =

Ghanaian politician (born 1983)

Member of the Ghana Parliament for Karaga Constituency

Personal details
- Born: 17 February 1983 (age 43)
- Party: National Democratic Congress

Alhassan Sualihu Dandaawa (born 17 February 1983) is a Ghanaian politician and member of the Seventh Parliament of the Fourth Republic of Ghana representing the Karaga Constituency in the Northern Region on the ticket of the National Democratic Congress.

== Personal life ==
Dandaawa is a Muslim and is married with a child.

== Early life and education ==
Dandaawa was born on February 17, 1983. He hails from Karaga, a town in the Northern Region of Ghana. He entered Islamic University College, Accra and obtained his Bachelor of Business Administration degree in Banking and Finance in 2009. He also attended Mouncrest University College, Kanda-Accra and obtained a bachelor of law degree.

== Politics ==
Dandaawa is a member of the National Democratic Congress (NDC). In 2012, he contested for the Karaga seat on the ticket of the NDC sixth parliament of the fourth republic and won.

=== 2012 election ===
Dandaawa contested the Karaga constituency parliamentary seat on the ticket of National Democratic Congress during the 2012 Ghanaian general election and won with 15,648 votes representing 51.20% of the total votes. He was elected over Baba Wahab of the New Patriotic Party, Abdulai Mohammed of IND, Fuseini Ziblim (Agyekum) of the progressive People's Party and Adam Yussif of the PNC. They obtained 13,107 votes, 1,514 votes, 177 votes and 119 votes respectively, equivalent to 42.88%, 4.95%, 0.58% and 0.39% of the total votes respectively.

==== 2016 election ====
Dandaawa was re- elected as a member of parliament for Karaga constituency on the ticket of the National Democratic Congress during the 2016 Ghanaian general election and won with 15,820 votes representing 48.97% of the total votes. He won the parliamentary seat over Sulemana Ibn Sa-eed of the New Patriotic Party who pulled 10,798 votes which is equivalent to 33.43%, parliamentary candidate for the Progressive People's Party Mohammed Alhassan had 5,405 votes representing 16.73%, Osman Adam Iddrisu of the Convention People's Party had 160 votes representing 0.50% and the parliamentary candidate for the PNC Alhassan Abdul Ganiyu had 120 votes representing 0.37% of the total votes.

===== 2020 election =====
Dandaawa again contested the Karaga (Ghana parliament constituency) parliamentary seat on the ticket of the National Democratic Congress during the 2020 Ghanaian general election but lost the election to Mohammed Amin Adam of the New Patriotic Party.

== Employment ==
- Administrative Assistant, Ministry of Foreign Affairs and Regional Integration, Accra
- Member of Parliament (January 7, 2013–January 7, 2021)
