= Rosina Zeinab Abdul‑Rahaman =

Ghanaian local government administrator

Hon. Rosina Zenabu Abdul-Rahaman

District Chief Executive of Nanton District
- Incumbent
- Assumed office 2025
- Appointed by: John Dramani Mahama
- President: John Dramani Mahama

Personal details
- Born: Rosina Zenabu Abdul-Rahaman
- Citizenship: Ghanaian
- Party: National Democratic Congress
- Occupation: Politician, Local Government Administrator
- Known for: First female DCE of Nanton District; only female DCE across Northern, Savannah, and North East regions

Hon. Rosina Zeinab Abdul-Rahaman is a Ghanaian local government administrator, who serves as the District Chief Executive (DCE) for the Nanton District in the Northern Region of Ghana. She was confirmed in April 2025 as the only female DCE across the Northern, Savannah, and North East regions following her appointment by President John Dramani Mahama.

== Political career ==
Rosina Zeinab Abdul-Rahaman was nominated by President John Dramani Mahama to serve as the District Chief Executive for the Nanton District in the Northern Region.

Her confirmation hearing was held in Nanton, on that day, Rosina secured 27 out of 28 eligible votes from the assembly members and government appointees, representing approximately 89% of the votes, a strong margin signaling significant support and confidence from the local leadership.

=== Development Initiates ===
In January 2026, as part of efforts to ensure a conducive learning environment for effective teaching and learning, the Nanton District Assembly under DCE Abdul-Rahaman Rosina handed over 450 school desks to the Nanton District Directorate of the Ghana Education Service (GSE).
