= Alhassan Wayo Seini =

Ghanaian politician

Member of Ghana Parliament for Tamale Central constituency
- In office 7 January 2005 – 2 March 2006
- Preceded by: new constituency
- Succeeded by: Inusah Fuseini

Personal details
- Born: 12 September 1945 (age 81) Tamale, Northern Region Gold Coast (now Ghana)
- Party: National Democratic Congress
- Education: Kwame Nkrumah University of Science and Technology, Kumasi
- Occupation: Politician
- Profession: Animal husbandry

Alhassan Wayo Seini (born 12 September 1945) is a Ghanaian politician and a former member of parliament for the 4th parliament of the 4th republic of Ghana.

== Early life and education ==
Wayo was born and raised in Tamale. He has a background in Agricultural Science and also holds a bachelor of Science degree from the Kwame Nkrumah University of Science and Technology.

== Career ==
Wayo is an animal husbandry officer and was a former member of parliament for Tamale Central Constituency in the Northern Region of Ghana between 2005 and 2009.

== Politics ==
Wayo was the second National Vice Chairman of the New Patriotic Party until September 2000 when he left the party.

Wayo joined the National Democratic Congress (NDC) in 2003. He was first elected into the Ghanaian parliament on the ticket of the NDC during the 2004 Ghanaian general elections as the member of parliament for Tamale Central Constituency. He won by 35,635 votes, representing 58.2 percent out of the total 61,271 valid votes cast.

== Personal life ==
He is a Muslim.
