= Cape Coast South (Ghana parliament constituency) =

Constituency in the Central Region of Ghana

- constituency for the Parliament of Ghana
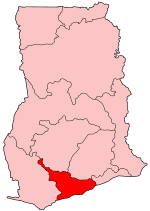
- District: Cape Coast Metropolitan Assembly
- Region: Central Region of Ghana

Current constituency
- Party: National Democratic Congress
- MP: Kweku George Ricketts-Hagan

Cape Coast South is one of the constituencies represented in the Parliament of Ghana. It elects one Member of Parliament (MP) by the first past the post system of election. Kweku George Ricketts-Hagan is the member of parliament for the constituency. Cape Coast South is located in the Cape Coast Metropolitan Assembly of the Central Region of Ghana.

== Members of Parliament ==
Election	Member	Party
2016	Kweku G. Ricketts-Hagan	National Democratic Congress
