= Tamale Central (Ghana parliament constituency) =

Constituencies in Ghana

- constituency for the Parliament of Ghana
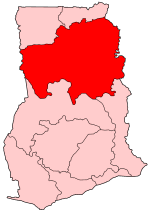
- District: Tamale Metropolitan District
- Region: Northern Region of Ghana

Current constituency
- Created: 2004
- Party: National Democratic Congress
- MP: Alidu Mahama Seidu

Tamale Central is one of the constituencies represented in the Parliament of Ghana. It elects one member of parliament (MP) by the first-past-the-post system of election. Tamale Central is located in the Tamale Metropolitan district of the Northern Region of Ghana.

This seat was created prior to the Ghanaian parliamentary election in 2004.

At the by-election held on 4 April 2006, Alhassan Fuseini Inusah of the National Democratic Congress (NDC) won with a majority of 17502. This followed the resignation of Alhassan Wayo Seini (NDC), who resigned to join the New Patriotic Party but lost the resultant by-election.

How Alidu Mahama Seidu got there: He won NDC primary 6 Sept 2025: Took 840 of 1,511 votes, beating 11 other aspirants. Closest rival Abdul Hannan Gundado got 536

== Boundaries ==
The seat is located within the Tamale Municipal district of the Northern Region of Ghana.

== Members of Parliament ==
First elected	Member	Party
2004	Constituency created	
2004	Alhassan Wayo Seini	National Democratic Congress
2006	Alhassan Fuseini Inusah	National Democratic Congress
2020	Ibrahim Murtala Muhammed	National Democratic Congress
2025	Alidu Mahama Seidu	National Democratic Congress

== Elections ==
=== 2006 by-election ===
Alhassan Wayo Seini who was the sitting MP in 2006 left the NDC to join the New Patriotic Party. This triggered a by-election. He stood for the by-election as an independent candidate but lost his seat to who the NDC nominated as his replacement.

=== 2025 by-election ===
The 2025 by-election was called after the death of Ibrahim Murtala Muhammed in a helicopter crash. The Electoral Commission set 30 September 2025 as the date for the by-election. The New Patriotic Party opted not to contest the election. Three candidates filed to contest the election. They were Alidu Mahama Seidu of the NDC, Ibrahim Mohammed Hafiz of the Liberal Party of Ghana (LPG) and Alidu Mohammed Nasir-deen of the People's National Convention (PNC). Later on the same day, the LPG and PNC candidates withdrew their candidaces. The Electoral Commission reopened nominations for the by-election following the withdrawals. No new candidates came forward so Alidu Mahama Seidu was declared elected unopposed on 30 September 2025 by the Electoral Commission.

== Election results ==
2025 by-election: Tamale Central
Party	Candidate	Votes	%	±%
NDC	Alidu Mahama Seidu	elected unopposed	—	—
Majority		—	—	—
Turnout				—
Registered electors				

2024 Ghanaian general election: Tamale Central
Party	Candidate	Votes	%	±%
NDC	Ibrahim Murtala Muhammed	52,263	75.84	—
NPP	Sulemana Salifu	16,647	24.16	—
Majority		35,616	+51.37	—
Turnout				—
Registered electors				

2020 Ghanaian general election: Tamale Central
Party	Candidate	Votes	%	±%
NDC	Ibrahim Murtala Muhammed	41,196	54.09	—
NPP	Ibrahim Anyars Imoro	33,627	44.08	—
People's National Convention	Mubarik Abdul Karim	179	0.2	—
Majority		41,196	54.09	—
Turnout				—
Registered electors				

2016 Ghanaian parliamentary election: Tamale Central
Party	Candidate	Votes	%	±%
NDC	Inusah Fuseini	38,531	59.81	—
NPP	Ibrahim Anyars Imoro	25,230	39.17	—
PPP	Baba Alhassan	310	0.48	—
CPP	Abubakari Abdulai Madugu	221	0.34	—
People's National Convention	Salifu Iddrisu	126	0.20	—
Majority		38,531	59.81	+0.14
Turnout		64,769	77.15	−5.52
Registered electors		83,947		

2012 Ghanaian parliamentary election: Tamale Central
Party	Candidate	Votes	%	±%
NDC	Inusah Fuseini	39,545	59.67	—
NPP	Iddrisu Musah	23,761	35.85	—
Independent	Aminu Ibrahim	1,090	1.64	—
PPP	Adam Mariama	630	0.95	—
Independent	Mahama Seth Sayibu	541	0.82	—
CPP	Haruna Hamza Kaasankomi	349	0.53	—
People's National Convention	Salifu Iddrisu	204	0.31	—
NDP	Abdulai Rashas Mamduhu	117	0.18	—
Majority		39,545	59.67	−6.46
Turnout		66,759	82.67	+8.82
Registered electors		80,751		

2008 Ghanaian parliamentary election: Tamale Central
Party	Candidate	Votes	%	±%
NDC	Inusah Fuseini	40,625	66.13	—
NPP	Mohammed Amin Adam	19,483	31.71	—
CPP	Abu Ismail	918	1.49	—
DFP	Ibrahim K. Abdul Rahaman	408	0.66	—
DPP	Ivy Amedior	0	0.00	—
People's National Convention	Baby Mladi	0	0.00	—
RPD	Emmanuel Mensah	0	0.00	—
Majority		40,625	66.13	+25.03
Turnout		62,292	73.85	—
Registered electors		84,346		

Tamale Central by-election, 2006
Party	Candidate	Votes	%	±%
NDC	Alhassan Fuseini Inusah	29,081	68.3	+10.1
Independent	Alhassan Wayo Seini	11,579	27.2	(−13.0)
CPP	Basharu Alhassan Daballi	1,365	3.2	+2.7
Independent	Ahmed Abdul-Rahim	416	0.9	—
DPP	Rita Adams Rukaya	157	0.3	—
Majority		17,502	41.1	+23.1
Turnout				—
Registered electors				

2004 Ghanaian parliamentary election: Tamale Central
Party	Candidate	Votes	%	±%
NDC	Alhassan Wayo Seini	35,635	58.2	—
NPP	Mohammed Amin Adam	24614	40.2	—
People's National Convention	Iddrisu Andani U-Azu	693	1.1	—
CPP	Dr Adam Gamel Nasser	329	0.5	—
Majority		11,021	18.0	—
Turnout		63,845	96.94	—
Registered electors		65,863		

== See also ==
- List of Ghana Parliament constituencies
