= Kweku George Ricketts-Hagan =

Ghanaian politician

The Honourable Kweku George Ricketts-Hagan MP
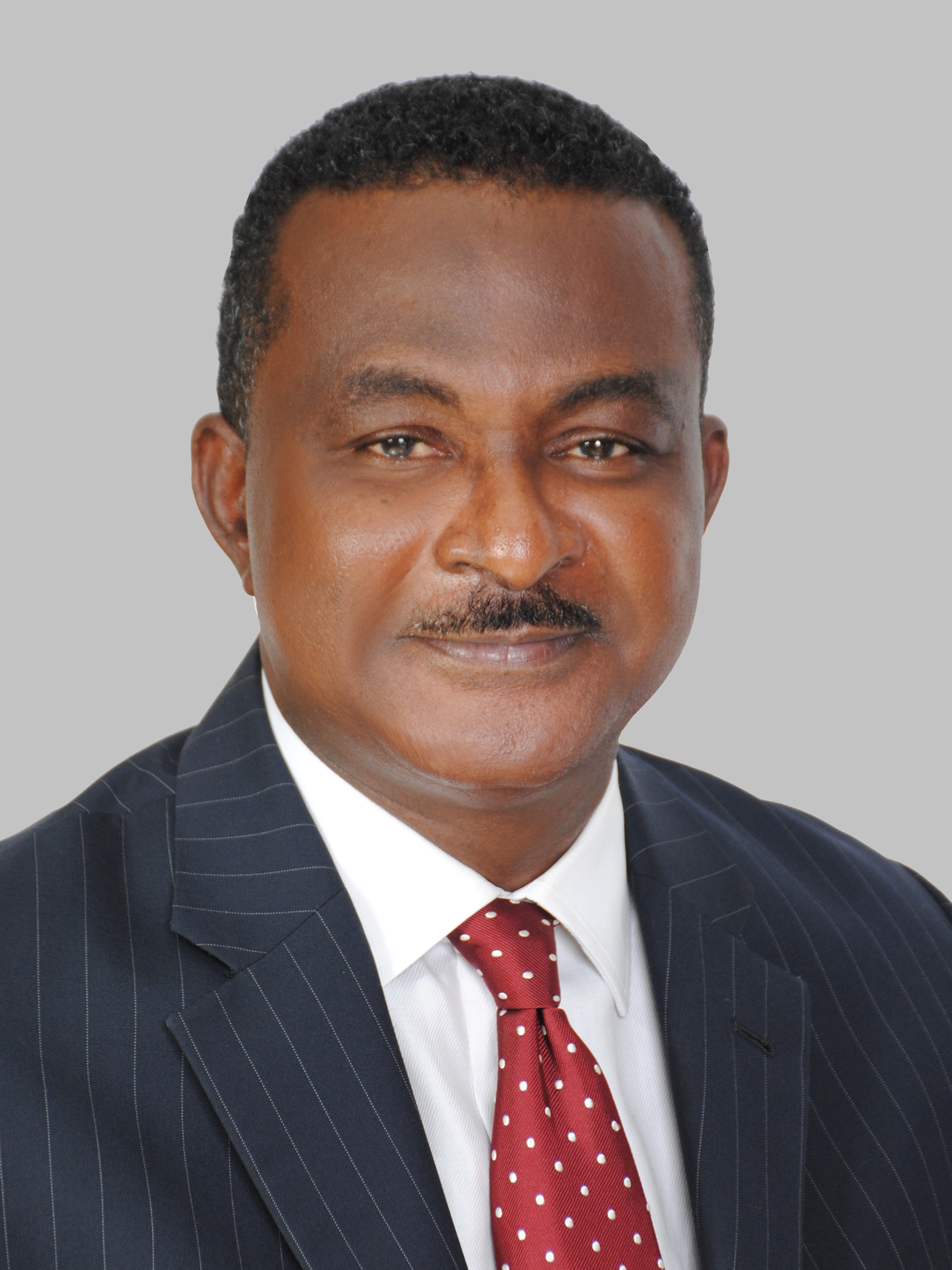

Member of the Ghana Parliament for Cape Coast South
- Incumbent
- Assumed office 7 January 2013

Deputy Minister for Trade and Industry
- In office July 2014 – January 2016 Serving with Ibrahim Murtala Muhammed
- President: John Mahama
- Minister: Ekwow Spio-Garbrah
- Preceded by: Edwin Nii Lante Vanderpuye

Deputy Minister for Finance
- In office 2013–2014
- President: John Mahama
- Minister: Seth Terkper
- Succeeded by: Mona Quartey

Personal details
- Born: 21 August 1963 (age 63) Cape Coast, Ghana
- Party: National Democratic Congress
- Spouse: Lillian Ricketts-Hagan
- Children: 5
- Education: University of Chicago Business School
- Occupation: Politician
- Profession: Economist, Investment Banker

Kweku George Ricketts-Hagan (born 1963) is a Ghanaian politician and member of the Seventh Parliament of the Fourth Republic of Ghana representing the Cape Coast South Constituency in the Central Region on the ticket of the National Democratic Congress.

== Early life and education ==
Ricketts-Hagan was born on 21 August 1963 in Cape Coast in the Central Region of Ghana. He holds an MBA from the University of Chicago Business School and a master's degree in Financial Economics from the University of London.

== Career ==
Ricketts-Hagan was the managing director of SAS Finance Group.

== Politics ==
Ricketts-Hagan is a member of the National Democratic Congress. He is currently the member of parliament representative for the Cape Coast South Constituency.

=== 2016 elections ===
In the 2016 Ghanaian general elections, he won the Cape Coast South Constituency parliamentary seat with 20,456 votes making 49.8% of the total votes cast whilst the NPP parliamentary candidate Michael Arthur Dadzie had 19,718 votes making 48.0% of the total votes cast, the PPP parliamentary candidate Bright Edem Droefenu had 606 votes making 1.5% of the total votes cast, an Independent parliamentary candidate Mr. Albert Isaac Kofi Cobbinah had 203 votes making 0.5% of the total votes cast and the CPP parliamentary candidate Ato Aidoo-Nyanor had 78 votes making 0.2% of the total votes cast.

=== 2020 elections ===
In the 2020 Ghanaian general elections, he again won the Cape Coast South Constituency parliamentary seat with 21,118 votes making 51.7% of the total votes cast whilst the NPP parliamentary candidate Ernest Arthur had 19,714 votes making 48.3% of the total votes cast.

=== 2024 election ===
He retained the seat as MP for Cape South Constituency on the ticket of the NDC with total votes of 21,277 whiles his opponent had 14,163 votes.

=== Minister ===
In 2016, Ricketts-Hagan became the minister of the Central Region of Ghana. He served in the Government of Ghana ministry as the deputy minister for Finance from 2013 to 2014 and the deputy minister for Trade and Industries from 2014 to 2016.

=== Committees ===
Ricketts-Hagan is a Ranking Member of the Privileges Committee, also a member of the Gender and Children Committee and also a member of the Trade, Industry and Tourism Committee.

== Personal life ==
Ricketts-Hagan is a Christian. He is married with five children.

== Controversy ==
In October 2021, Ricketts-Hagan was sued by Mr. Ernest Arthur who was the Metropolitan Chief Executive for Cape Coast for his defamatory comments made against him. Ricketts-Hagan was asked by the Cape Coast High Court to retract and apologize to Mr. Arthur. Ricketts-Hagan was also charged GH¢100,000.
