= Alhassan Yakubu =

Ghanaian politician and teacher

MP for Nanton
- In office 7 January 1993 – 6 January 2001
- President: Jerry John Rawlings

MP for Nanton
- In office 7 January 2005 – 6 January 2009
- President: John Agyekum Kufour
- Succeeded by: Alhaji Iddrisu Abdul-Kareem

Personal details
- Born: 7 June 1949 (age 77) Nanton, Northern Region Gold Coast (now Ghana)
- Party: National Democratic Congress
- Education: Kanton Teacher Training College
- Occupation: Politician
- Profession: teacher

Alhassan Yakubu is a Ghanaian politician and teacher. He served as a member of parliament for the Nanton constituency in the Northern Region of Ghana.

== Early life and education ==
Yakubu was born on 7 June 1949. He went to Kanton Teacher Training College where he obtained an O level in Teacher's Cert A and become an educationist.

== Politics ==
He was elected into the first parliament of the fourth republic of Ghana on 7 January 1993 after he was pronounced winner at the 1992 Ghanaian parliamentary election held on 29 December 1992.

Alhassan Yakubu is a member of the National Democratic Congress. He became a member of parliament for the third parliament of the fourth republic of Ghana for the Nanton constituency in the Northern Region of Ghana during the 2000 Ghanaian general elections with a total vote cast of 5,659 representing 50.50%.

He again became a member of parliament from January 2005 after winning the 2004 Ghanaian general election in December 2004. He was elected as the member of parliament for the Nanton Constituency in the fourth parliament of the fourth republic of Ghana under His excellency the Ex-President J.A Kufour's administration.

He obtain a total vote cast of 8,338 which represent 58.50% whiles his opponent candidates, Alhaji Abdul- Kareem Iddrisu of the New Patriotic Party polled 5,778 representing 40.60% of the votes and Abu Alhassan of the Convention Peoples Party obtained 132 also representing 0.90% of the total vote cast. Alhassan Yakubu emerge as the winner of the Nanto Constituency.

Prior to his election into the 3rd Parliament, he also represented his constituency at the 1996 Ghanaian General Elections. He was elected into the 2nd parliament on 7 January 1997 having defeated Tia Alhassan of the New Patriotic Party by obtaining 48.80% of the total votes cast which is equivalent to 6,682 while his opposition obtained 21.30% which is equivalent to 2,917 votes.

== Personal life ==
Alhassan Yakubu is a Muslim.
