= Iddrisu Abdul-Kareem =

Ghanaian politician

Member of Parliament of Ghana
- Incumbent
- Assumed office 2008
- Constituency: Nanton constituency

Personal details
- Born: June 1, 1948 (age 78) Northern Region (Ghana)
- Party: New Patriotic Party
- Education: Kwame Nkrumah University of Science and Technology
- Occupation: Politician

Iddrisu Abdul-Kareem (born June 1, 1948) is a Ghanaian Politician and a member of the Fifth Parliament of the Fourth Republic of Ghana. He represented the Nanton constituency of the Northern region of Ghana.

== Early life and education ==
Abdul-Kareem was born on June 1, 1948. He hails from Nanton in the Northern region of Ghana. He obtained a diploma in Accountancy, from the Institute of Planning and Technology Administration of the Kwame Nkrumah University of Science and Technology in 1974.

== Career and politics ==
Abdul-Kareem is the Chief executive officer of Kadil Company Limited in Tamale, Northern region of Ghana. He is a member of the New Patriotic Party. During the 2004 Ghanaian general elections, he contested on the ticket of the New Patriotic Party but lost against Alhaji Alhassan Yakubu of the National Democratic Congress. However, he contested again and won the Nanton constituency seat in the 2008 Ghanaian general election, with a 6,868 votes out of the 14,592 of the valid votes cast representing 45.9%.

== Personal life ==
He is a Muslim and married with seven children.
