= 2025 Ghanaian Air Force Harbin Z-9 crash =

2025 helicopter accident in Ghana

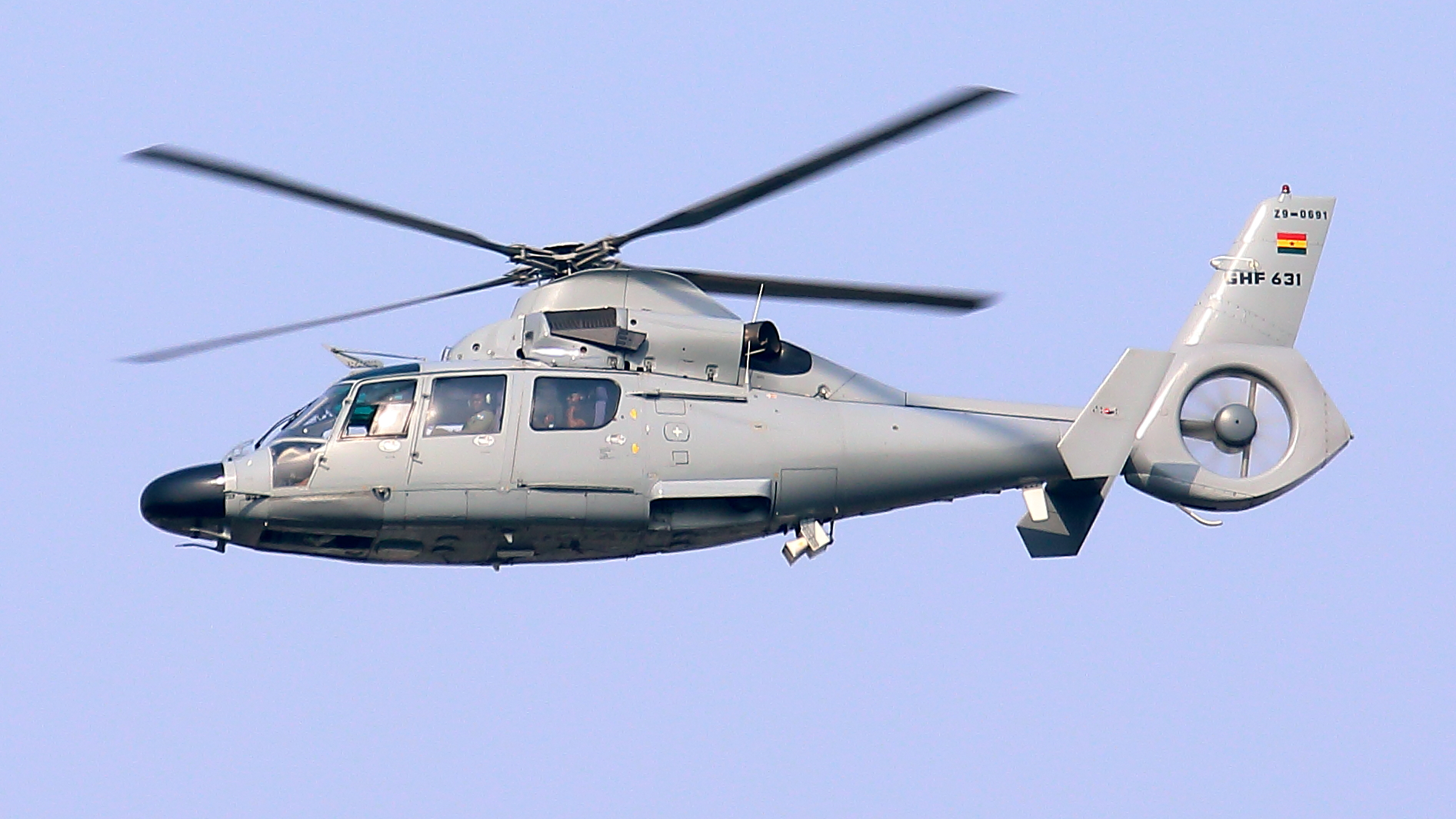
- GHF 631, the helicopter involved in the accident, seen in 2024

Accident
- Date: 6 August 2025
- Summary: Crashed en route; under investigation
- Site: Akrofuom District, Ashanti Region, Ghana; 6.28°N 1.60°W

Aircraft
- Aircraft type: Harbin Z-9EH
- Operator: Ghana Air Force
- Registration: GHF 631
- Flight origin: Accra International Airport
- Destination: Obuasi Airport
- Occupants: 8
- Passengers: 5
- Crew: 3
- Fatalities: 8
- Survivors: 0

On 6 August 2025, a Ghana Air Force Harbin Z-9 helicopter carrying eight people to an event about fighting illegal mining crashed into a forested mountainside in the Ashanti region of Ghana, killing all eight people on board. Among the dead were Ghana's defence minister Edward Omane Boamah and environment minister Ibrahim Murtala Muhammed.

== Background ==
=== Aircraft ===
The aircraft involved in the crash was a Harbin Z-9EH military helicopter, a Chinese-made naval platform known for its versatility and rugged performance. The Z-9EH is a specialized variant of the Z-9 helicopter, itself a Chinese-licensed version of the French Eurocopter AS365 Dauphin. It is primarily used by the People's Liberation Army Navy and other security forces for anti-submarine warfare, anti-ship operations and search and rescue missions.

=== Passengers and crew ===
The occupants were identified as Minister of Defence Edward Omane Boamah, Minister for Environment Ibrahim Murtala Muhammed, acting deputy national security coordinator Limuna Mohammed Muniru, vice chairman of the ruling National Democratic Congress (NDC) Samuel Sarpong, former parliamentary candidate Samuel Aboagye, Squadron Leader Peter Bafemi Anala, Flying Officer Twum Ampadu and Sergeant Ernest Addo Mensah.

President John Mahama had originally been scheduled to attend the event, but instead delegated the ministers to represent him due to a concurrent occasion.

== Crash ==
According to the Ghana Armed Forces, the helicopter took off from Accra International Airport in Accra at 9:12 a.m., heading northwest into the interior toward the gold-mining area for an event about tackling illegal mining at the Obuasi Black Park in Obuasi, Ashanti Region, when it went off the radar. The helicopter's wreckage was found later, with all of the victims being burnt beyond recognition in a post-crash fire.

Footage of the crash site showed debris on fire in a forest as people circled around to help. The crash was one of Ghana's worst air disasters in more than a decade.

== Aftermath ==
The remains of the victims were transported to Accra. Samples were flown to South Africa for DNA analysis to aid in their identification. The burial of the Muslim victims of the crash, which was scheduled on 7 August, was postponed due to identification procedures. A state funeral for the victims was held in Accra on 15 August and was attended by President Mahama.

== Investigation ==
The Ghana Armed Forces said an investigation was under way. The Ghana National Fire and Rescue Service confirmed they will investigate the crash in conjunction with other security agencies. The flight recorder of the helicopter was recovered by a team of investigators a day after the crash.

== Reactions ==
=== National ===
The Parliament of Ghana expressed deep sorrow over the crash and pledged solidarity with the nation in mourning.

Presidential chief of staff Julius Debrah described the crash as a "national tragedy", announced that flags will fly half-mast until further notice and led a government delegation to receive the remains of the victims.

President John Mahama suspended all activities and declared three days of national mourning. Vice President Jane Naana Opoku-Agyemang and other top officials visited the families of the victims.

The NDC described the crash as an irreplaceable loss to the party and expressing its "deepest and most heartfelt condolences to the bereaved families, the Ghana Armed Forces, and the people of Ghana".

=== International ===
Condolences were expressed by several countries and international organizations, including the United Kingdom, Sierra Leone, The Gambia, Nigeria, the African Development Bank, the United Nations, ECOWAS, the African Union, the World Trade Organization, Germany, Kenya, Namibia, Italy, and the Holy See.
