= Seidu Al-Hassan =

Ghanaian agricultural economist and university VC

Seidu Al-Hassan is a Ghanaian agricultural economist and vice-chancellor of the University for Development Studies in Tamale, Northern Region, Ghana. He took up the post of vice-chancellor on 1 September 2022.

== Early life and education ==
Al-Hassan is from Jisonaayili, a suburb of Tamale, and studied at the Northern School of Business. He studied economics at the University of Cape Coast (1989–1993) and has a master's degree (1994–1996) and PhD (2004) from the University of Ghana.

== Selected publications ==
- Al-Hassan, Seidu (2015). Ghana's Shea Industry: Knowing the Fundamentals. Institute for Continuing Education and Interdisciplinary Research, University for Development Studies. ISBN 978-9988-2-2174-4.
- Quartey, Peter; Al-Hassan, Seidu (2008). The Inter-relationship Between Land Ownership, Access to Finance, and Product Markets in Ghana. Institute of Statistical, Social & Economic Research, University of Ghana. ISBN 978-9964-75-064-0.
- Al-Hassan, Seidu (2008). Technical Efficiency of Rice Farmers in Northern Ghana. African Economic Research Consortium. ISBN 978-9966-778-26-0.
