= Northern School of Business =

School in Ghana

- Tamale, Northern Region, Ghana; Ghana

Information
- Type: Secondary/high school
- Motto: Ambition is the ladder to success
- Established: 1972 (54 years ago)
- Grades: Forms 1–3
- Nickname: NOBISCO

Northern School of Business (NOBISCO) is a mixed-gender school in Tamale in the Northern Region of Ghana. Nobisco Is a category C school under the Ghana Education Service placement module.

== History ==
A. S. O. Arthur founded the Northern School of Business as a private institution in 1972. After that, the school was housed in a temporary building lacking piped water, electricity, and other necessities. In 1976, the school became a part of the public system. In 1991, it was transformed into a senior secondary school in 1991. The current headmaster is Alhassan Issah Dokurugu. 50th Anniversary: Celebrated its 50th anniversary in November 2022.

On the 28th of January 2026, there was a fire outbreak at the Girls Dormitory.

== Population ==
As of November 2022, the school had more than 3,000 students enrolled and roughly 227 teaching and support staff members.

== Notable alumni ==
- Mohammed Amin Adam
- Seidu Al-hassan

== Programs offered ==
- Business
- General Science
- General Arts
- Home Economics
- Agriculture
- Visual Arts
