= Tamale Islamic Science Senior High School =

Coordinates: 9.4612°N 0.8354°W

Location
- P. O. Box 1485 Tamale; Tamale, Ghana; Northern Region; Ghana

Information
- School type: Secondary co-educational boarding school
- Motto: Knowledge, Supplication to God, Service to Humanity
- Religious affiliation: Islam
- Established: 1997; 29 years ago
- Status: Active
- School board: Board of Governors
- School district: Sagnarigu Municipal District
- Oversight: Ghana Education Service
- Grades: Forms 1–3 (Grades 10–12)
- Gender: Co-ed
- Age range: 14 to 18 years
- Education system: Senior High School
- Language: English
- Nickname: Tissec

Tamale Islamic Science Senior High School (Tissec) is a public, co-educational senior high school located in Tamale, the capital of the Northern Region of Ghana. It was established in 1997 as a STEM school by the Islamic Development Bank. Later, it was absorbed into the Ghanaian public school system. The school was used as a temporary lecture space for students of the University for Development Studies.

== Academics ==
Tissec offers a curriculum focused on science and technology, preparing students for further education and careers in science, technology, engineering, and mathematics. The school provides three main programs:

- General Science
- Home Economics
- Agriculture

== Facilities and student life ==
Tissec is primarily a boarding school, offering on-campus residence for almost all of its students. This allows students across Ghana to access quality science education. However, the school also accepts a limited number of day students who live close enough to commute daily. There are four residential houses:

- Kanvilli House (Blue)
- Saatingli House(Yellow)
- Gbanzaba House(Green)
- Nkrumah House(Red)

Other facilities essential for academic and student life, includes: biology, chemistry, physics, and computer laboratories, enabling scientific exploration and research. Additionally, an agricultural station dedicated to horticultural studies provides hands-on learning opportunities. Supporting student well-being, the campus features a dispensary, library, mosque, and sports field for medical assistance, academic resources, spiritual engagement, and recreational activities, respectively. A market area is also available for the purchase of hot meals, snacks, and school items, ensuring convenience for students and staff alike.

== Admissions and school performance ==
Students are admitted to TISSEC through the Computerized School Selection and Placement System (CSSPS), the centralized admissions system for Ghanaian senior high schools.

== Sister schools ==
Tissec has a sister school relationship with Kentucky Country Day School, Louisville, as part of the Tamale-Louisville sister city relationship administered under the office of the Zosimli Naa.

== Records ==
- 2023 Northern Zonal Champions, National Science and Math Quiz

== Motto ==
Knowledge Supplication to God and service to Humanity

== School Code ==
0080108
