= Karaga (Ghana parliament constituency) =

Constituency in Ghana

- constituency for the Parliament of Ghana
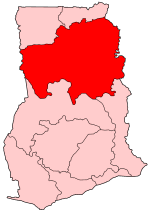
- District: Karaga District
- Region: Northern Region of Ghana

Current constituency
- Created: 2004
- Party: New Patriotic Party
- MP: Mohammed Amin Adam

Karaga is one of the constituencies represented in the Parliament of Ghana. It elects one Member of Parliament (MP) by the first past the post system of election. Karaga is located in the Karaga district of the Northern Region of Ghana.

== History ==
This was one of the many constituencies created prior to the 2004 presidential and parliamentary elections.

== Boundaries ==
The seat is located entirely within the Karaga district of the Northern Region of Ghana.

== Members of Parliament ==
First elected	Member	Party
2004	Iddrisu Dawuda	National Democratic Congress
2012	Alhassan Sualihu Dandaawa	National Democratic Congress
2020	Mohammed Amin Adam	New Patriotic Party

== Elections ==
The following table shows the parliamentary election results for Karaga constituency in the 2020 Ghanaian general election.

2020 Ghanaian general election: Karaga Source:Electoral Commission of Ghana
Party	Candidate	Votes	%	±%
New Patriotic Party	Mohammed Amin Adam	28,335	59.00	—
National Democratic Congress	Alhassan Sualihu Dandaawa	19,690	41.00	—
Majority		28,335	59.00	—

The table below shows the parliamentary election results for Karaga constituency during the 2016 Ghanaian general election.

2016 Ghanaian parliamentary election: Karaga Source:Ghana Home Page
Party	Candidate	Votes	%	±%
National Democratic Congress	Alhassan Sualihu Dandaawa	15,820	48.97	—
New Patriotic Party	Sulemana Ibn Sa-eed	10,798	33.43	—
Progressive People's Party	Mohammed Alhassan Somuah	5, 405	16.73	—
Convention People's Party	Osman Adam Iddrisu	160	0.50	—
People's National Convention	Alhassan Abdul Ganiu	120	0.37	—
Majority		15, 820	48.97	—

The following table shows the parliamentary election results for Karaga constituency in the 2012 Ghanaian general election.

2012 Ghanaian parliamentary election: Karaga Source:Ghana Home Page
Party	Candidate	Votes	%	±%
National Democratic Congress	Alhassan Sualihu Dandaawa	15,648	51.20	—
New Patriotic Party	Baba Wahab	13,107	42.88	—
IND	Abdulai Mohammed Sandow	1, 514	4.95	—
Progressive People's Party	Fuseini Ziblim Yakubu(Agyekum)	177	0.58	—
People's National Convention	Adam Yussif	119	0.39	—
Majority		15,648	51.20	—

2008 Ghanaian parliamentary election: Karaga Source:Ghana Home Page
Party	Candidate	Votes	%	±%
National Democratic Congress	Iddrisu Dawuda	13,361	56.2	−8.3
New Patriotic Party	Baba Wahab	9,783	41.1	+5.6
People's National Convention	Mohammed Tong Doo	301	1.3	—
Democratic Freedom Party	Haruna Abukari	264	1.1	—
Convention People's Party	Adam Abubakari Mohammed	86	0.4	—
Democratic People's Party	Adam Yussifu	0	0.0	—
Majority		3,578	35.1	+6.1
Turnout		—	—	—

2004 Ghanaian parliamentary election: Karaga Source:Electoral Commission of Ghana
Party	Candidate	Votes	%	±%
National Democratic Congress	Iddrisu Dawuda	14,868	64.5	—
New Patriotic Party	Osman Issah Abukari	8,192	35.5	—
Majority		6,676	29.0	—
Turnout		23,917	90.7	—

== See also ==
- List of Ghana Parliament constituencies
