= Edward Omane Boamah =

Ghanaian politician and physician (1975–2025)

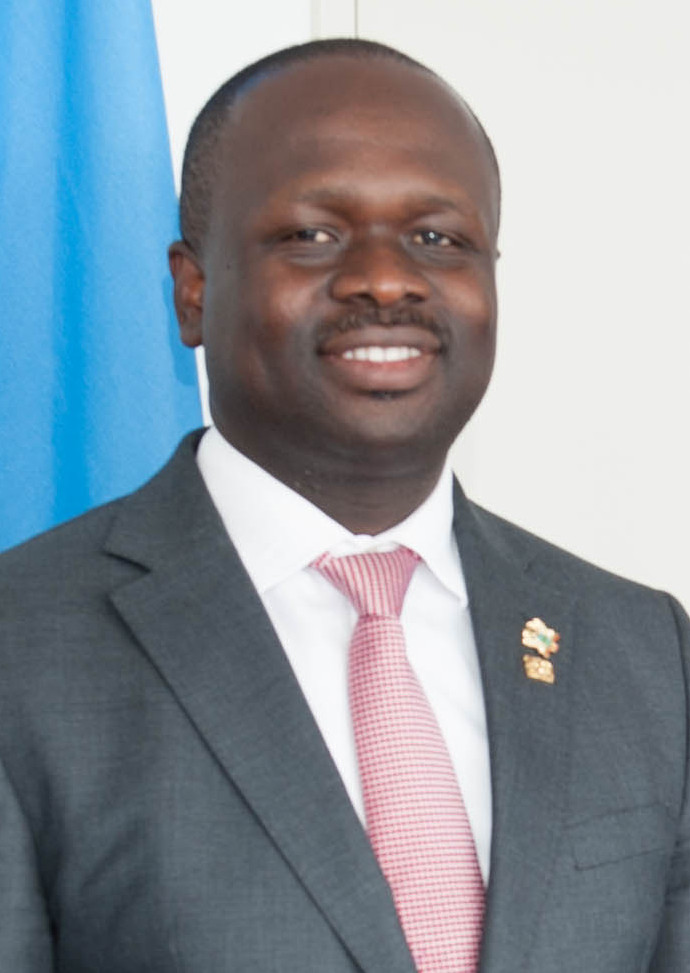
- Omane Boamah in 2015

Minister for Defence
- In office 30 January 2025 – 6 August 2025
- President: John Mahama
- Preceded by: Dominic Nitiwul
- Succeeded by: Vacant

Minister for Communications
- In office 14 February 2013 – January 2017
- President: John Mahama
- Preceded by: Haruna Iddrisu
- Succeeded by: Ursula Owusu

Deputy Minister of Youth and Sports
- In office February 2012 – January 2013
- President: John Atta-Mills

Deputy Minister for Environment, Science and Technology
- In office April 2009 – February 2012

Personal details
- Born: Edward Kofi Omane Boamah; 26 December 1975 Nkawkaw, Ghana
- Died: 6 August 2025 (aged 49) Adansi District, Ashanti Region, Ghana
- Party: National Democratic Congress
- Spouse: Rita Adubea Offei (m. 2006)
- Children: 3
- Education: University of Ghana Medical School; London School of Economics; London School of Hygiene and Tropical Medicine
- Profession: Medical Practitioner; Health Policy Planning and Financing Expert

Edward Kofi Omane Boamah (26 December 1975 - 6 August 2025) was a Ghanaian politician and physician who served as the minister of defence from 1 February 2025 until his death in a helicopter crash on 6 August 2025. As a member of the National Democratic Congress, he previously served as the Minister for Communications and spokesperson to the president of Ghana.

== Early life and education ==
Omane Boamah was born on 26 December 1975 in Nkawkaw to Edward Kwame Omane and Leticia Asante. He hailed from Koforidua Effiduase. He was married to Rita Adubea Offei and had three children. Raised Catholic, he was baptized at St. George's Catholic Church in Koforidua. He served as an altar boy in addition to being a member, and later became the president of the Koforidua Chapter of Knights of St. John Cadet Corps. He was also a Boy Scout.

He first attended Koforidua Presby 'B' School, continued at Nana Kwaku Boateng Experimental School, and furthered to Pope John Senior High School and Minor Seminary in Koforidua, Ghana. He was an alumnus of the University of Ghana Medical School, where he trained as a Medical Doctor. He briefly attended Washington University School of Medicine in St. Louis, Missouri, USA. In addition, he held a master's degree in health policy planning and financing from both London School of Economics and London School of Hygiene & Tropical Medicine. As a student, he served as a president of the National Union of Ghana Students (NUGS) and the coordinating secretary of the Federation of Ghana Medical Students Association (FGMSA).

In his early career, he served as spokesperson for Junior Doctors. As an activist, he was involved in a number of causes including being a member of the Committee for Joint Action (CJA) and the Free Tsatsu Movement.

== Political career ==
=== Deputy minister for environment, science and technology ===
From 2009 to 2012, he served as deputy minister for environment, science and technology, and later as National Democratic Congress's deputy campaign coordinator in the 2012 general elections. He also served as vice chairman of the United Nations Commission on Science and Technology for Development (UNCSTD). During his tenure, he assisted in the roll out of the flagship Mathematics, Science and Technology Scholarship Scheme (MASTESS) for 41,000 students and the implementation of the Free Laptops Initiative for Students and Teachers.

As deputy minister for environment, science and technology, he chaired the committees that investigated environmental contamination incidents including spillage of Low Toxicity Oil Based Mud (LTOBM) by KOSMOS Energy in the Jubilee Offshore Field – West Cape Three Points in Ghana and the spillage of sodium cyanide in a water body in Kenyase, Ghana, by Newmont Ghana Gold Limited. During his tenure, the government invested in a nationwide tree planting address issues relating to climate change and excessive cutting down of trees, which threatens the world. Additionally, he spearheaded a national tree-planting campaign against deforestation.

He led the Government of Ghana's delegation to the negotiations at the Conference of Parties to the United Nations Framework Convention on Climate Change (UNFCCC), Cancun- Mexico in 2010.

He was a Ghanaian representative at the conference on the Swine Flu Global Pandemic in Washington DC in August, 2009.

=== Deputy minister of youth and sports ===
Edward served as deputy minister for youth and sports in the administration of President John Atta Mills from 2012 to 2013, coordinating Ghana's participation in the 2013 Africa Cup of Nations.

=== Minister for communications ===
He was appointed in February 2013 by President John Mahama after the Ghanaian general election in December 2012, as spokesperson to the president Mahama from August 2014 to January 2017. Prior to these appointments, he was assigned the responsibility of coordinating Ghana's participation in the 2013 Africa Cup of Nations (Afcon 2013).

As minister for communications, he was an advocate for the protection of children online. He responded to the growing cyber threats by setting up the National Computer Emergency Response Team (CERT) and a National Committee on Child Online Protection to develop a national child online protection framework and usage of the internet. He served as a member of the board of Ghana AIDS Commission from 2014 to 2016. As minister, he launched initiatives such as Ghana's 4G LTE rollout (GOTA) for the security services. He was involved in the establishment of Ghana's first National Data Centre, and is credited for the Eastern Corridor Fibre Optic Backbone Infrastructure. He supervised Ghana's rapid nationwide mobile penetration. From 2014 to 2017, he also served as presidential spokesperson after President Mahama merged the Communications and Information Ministries.

Additionally, he represented Ghana at various cybersecurity conferences and meetings in Asia, South America and Europe between 2013 and 2016. He was a member of Ghana's delegation to the United Nations General Assembly Meetings in New York in 2015 and 2016. Between 2013 and 2017, he chaired the governing board of the Ghana Investment Fund for Electronic Communication (GIFEC).

He was a board member of the Ghana AIDS Commission from 2014 to January 2017.

=== NDC Director of Elections and IT ===
Within his political party, Omane Boamah served as the first person to hold the combined position of director of Elections and IT in 2024. In this role, he introduced reforms including a novel examination requirement for party polling agents and co-writing a manual on elections. He also led the establishment of an internal electoral collation system which was used in the 2024 general elections.

=== Minister of defence ===
Omane Boamah was nominated and appointed as minister for defence in January 2025. Among his priorities were military welfare, settling hidden defence debts, tackling illegal mining known locally as galamsey regional equity in military recruitments and recruitment drive to enlist 12,000 new Ghanaian soldiers. He also secured a €50 million EU-financed security support package for the Ghanaian armed forces. He was a member of the National Security Council. He was the chairman of the governing board of the Kofi Annan International Peacekeeping Training Centre (KAIPTC). He was also a member of the ministerial advisory board of the Ministry of Foreign Affairs.

== Medical career ==
Omane Boamah served as a member of the WHO volunteers monitoring the 2004 Expanded Program on Immunization in the Asuogyaman District in the Eastern Region of Ghana and was also a member of the Medical Rescue team for the Accra Sports Stadium disaster in 2001. He resumed his medical practice at Afrah International Hospital after his party, the National Democratic Congress, lost the 2016 general election.

== Notable previous assignments ==
- Spokesperson to the president of Ghana, John Mahama.
- Coordinator of Ghana's participation in the 2013 Africa Cup of Nations
- Chairman of Investigative Committees on the spillage of Low-Toxicity Oil-Based Mud (LTOBM) by Kosmos Energy in the Jubilee Offshore Field – West Cape Three Points in Ghana and the spillage of sodium cyanide in a Water Body in Kenyase, Ghana, by Newmont Ghana Gold Limited.

== Personal life ==
In 2006, Omane Boamah married Rita Adubea Offei, a chartered accountant and development finance professional and they had two daughters and a son.

== Death ==
Omane Boamah died in a military helicopter crash on 6 August 2025, while en route to Obuasi for an event to combat galamsey (illegal mining) in a Ghana Armed Forces Z‑9 helicopter. The accident, which occurred in the Adansi District in the Ashanti Region, killed all eight people aboard: Omane Boamah; minister for environment, science, technology and innovation Ibrahim Murtala Muhammed; acting deputy national security coordinator Limuna Mohammed Muniru; NDC vice chairman Samuel Sarpong; former parliamentary candidate Samuel Aboagye; pilot Peter Bafemi Anala; co-Pilot Manaen Twum Ampadu; and crewman Ernest Addo Mensah. He and other victims of the crash were accorded a state funeral in Accra on 15 August that was attended by President John Mahama.

== Works ==
Omane Boamah wrote a book on former president John Atta Mills, titled A Peaceful Man In An African Democracy, that is scheduled for posthumous release in late 2025.

Omane Boamah authored a 2004 book on advocacy in funding education in Ghana, “GETFund: A NUGS President’s Account”. He led the publication of “Accounting to the People; Changing Lives Transforming Ghana” which covered the achievements of the Mahama first administration, with a focus on the years between 2013 and 2015. He co-edited a W.H.O. Ghana sponsored Students’ newsletter focused on preventive health - “The Outreach”.

== See also ==
- List of Mahama government ministers
- National Democratic Congress

Political offices
Preceded by Haruna Iddrisu	Minister for Communications; 2013–2017	Succeeded by Ursula Owusu-Ekuful
