= Mohammed Hardi Tufeiru =

Ghanaian politician

Hon Mohammed Hardi Tuferu
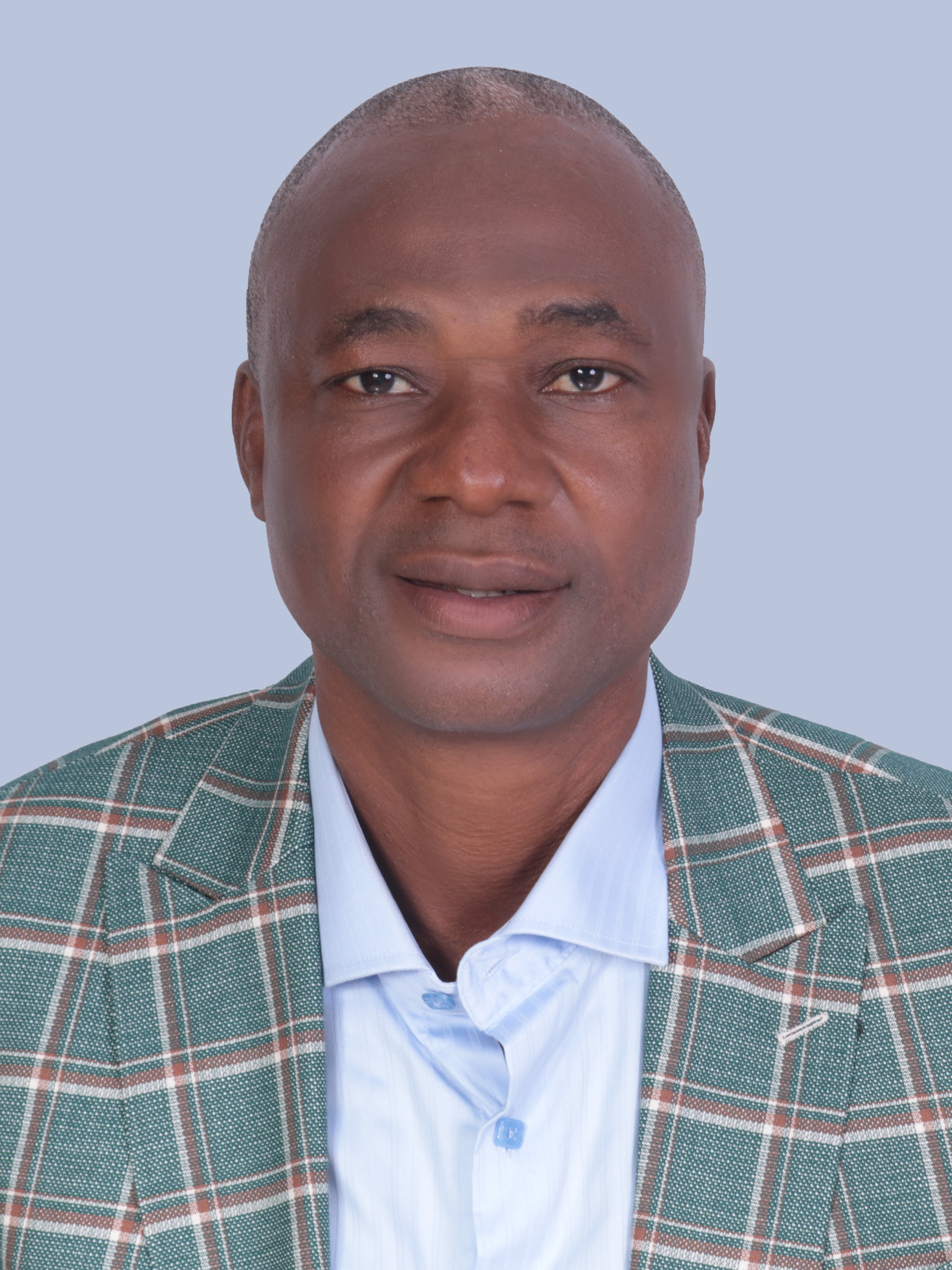

Member of the Ghana Parliament for Nanton Constituency
- Incumbent
- Assumed office 7 January 2021

Personal details
- Born: Mohammed Hardi Tuferu; 16 July 1969 (age 56) Zieng
- Party: New Patriotic Party
- Occupation: Politician
- Committees: Public Accounts Committee, Local Government and Rural Development Committee

Mohammed Hardi Tufeiru (born July 16, 1969) is a Ghanaian politician and member of the Seventh Parliament of the Fourth Republic of Ghana representing the Nanton Constituency in the Northern Region on the ticket of the New Patriotic Party. He is an academician and accountant, from the Institute of Chartered Accountant (ICAG) and holds MBA in Accounting from the University of Ghana and a Bachelor of Commerce degree from University of Cape Coast. He is currently the Deputy Minister of Agriculture.

== Education ==
He obtained GCE in 1996 and proceeded to University of Cape Coast to obtain B.Comm (Accounting) in the year 2000. He also obtained an M.B.A in accounting from the University of Ghana in the year 2006. He became a member of Institute of Chartered Accountant ( Accounting) in 2009. He is a member of IIA ( Auditing) 2016.

== Work ==
Hon. Mohamed Hardi Tuferu was a lecturer from 2001 to 2006 at the Tamale Technical University and the Head of Audit from 2006 to 2016. He sat on the Audit Reports Implementation Committees of a number of post secondary institutions between 2008 and 2016, including the University for Development Studies and Tamale Technical University. From 2007 to 2016, he was the Head of the Tamale Technical University's Internal Audit Department. At Tamale Technical University and the Institutes for Distance Learning, he taught accounting, Taxation, Cost & Management Accounting, Auditing, MIS, Public Sector Accounting, and Quantitative Methods (University of Cape Coast, University of Ghana and Kwame Nkrumah University of Science and Technology).

== Service at Parliament ==
During the 7th parliament, he was a Deputy Ranking Member of the Public Accounts Committee (PAC) and a member of the Committee on Environment, Science and Technology. He was also an African Parliamentary Union delegate. He was a member of the Petroleum Commission Ghana Board of Directors from 2017 to 2021, where he chaired the Finance and Local Content Committees. From 2017 to 2021, he also sat on the Audit Committee of the Board of Ghana Gas Co. Ltd. He is a member of the Public Accounts Committee (PAC) and the Committee on Local Government, Rural Development, and Decentralization in the current parliament.

== Personal life ==
Tuferu is Muslim, he is married to two wives with children
