= Inusah Fuseini =

Ghanaian lawyer and politician

Hon Inusah Abdulai B. Fuseini
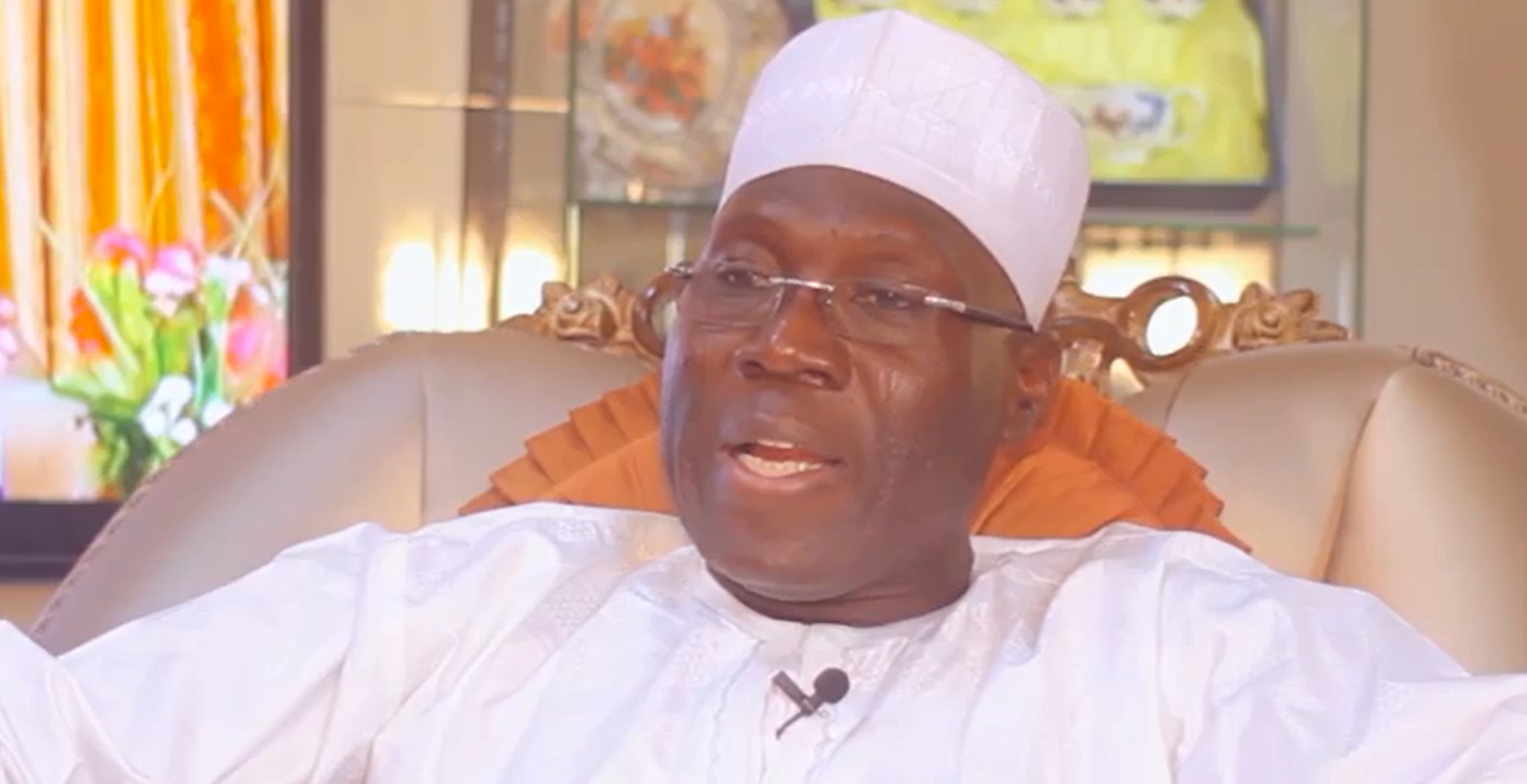

Member of the Ghana Parliament for Tamale Central
- In office 4 April 2006 – 6 January 2021
- Preceded by: Alhassan Wayo Seini
- Succeeded by: Ibrahim Murtala Muhammed

Ministry of Roads & Highways
- In office 30 January 2013 – 6 January 2017
- President: John Dramani Mahama
- Preceded by: Mike Hammah

Personal details
- Born: 23 January 1962 (age 64)
- Party: National Democratic Congress
- Children: 4
- Education: Bagabaga Training College; University of Ghana
- Profession: Lawyer

Inusah Abdulai Bistav Fuseini (born 23 January 1962) is a Ghanaian lawyer and politician. He is a former member of parliament for Tamale Central constituency and the former Minister for Lands and Natural Resources, former Minister of Roads and Highways in the Ghana government. He was the senior associate with the Law Trust Company in Accra before he went into politics.

== Early life and education ==
Fuseini is from Tishiegu-Tamale, in the Northern Region of Ghana. He was a senior associate with the Law Trust Company in Accra before he went into politics. He attended teacher training college at Bagabaga Training College (now Bagabaga College of Education) where he obtained his teacher certification to be a professional teacher. He then proceeded to the University of Ghana, Legon, for his bachelor's degree in law. He also has a master's degree in law from the University of Ghana.

== Political career ==
Fuseini, who is a member of the National Democratic Congress, became a member of parliament when Wayo Seini defected from the NDC to the New Patriotic Party (NPP). This triggered a by-election in the Tamale Central constituency on 4 April 2006. Fuseini won the election with a majority of 17,502. He successfully held his seat in the Ghanaian general election in December 2008 with 66% of the votes cast, in the Ghanaian general election in December 2012 and in 2016 with 59.81%.

He held positions as the Deputy Minister for Energy in 2009-2012, Minister for Land and Natural Resources in 2012-2013, Minister for Roads in 2013-2017.

== Personal life ==
Fuseini is a Muslim and was married to Abiba Fuseini. Fuseini has children.

== See also ==
- National Democratic Congress
- Tamale Central

Parliament of Ghana
Preceded by Wayo Seini	MP for Tamale Central; 2006 – present	Incumbent
Political offices
Preceded by Mike Hammah	Minister for Lands and Natural Resources; 2013 – present	Succeeded by Nii Osah Mills
