= Nanton (Ghana parliament constituency) =

Ghanaian electoral district

- constituency for the Parliament of Ghana
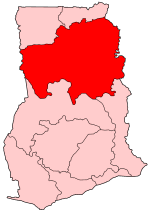
- District: Savelugu-Nanton District
- Region: Northern Region of Ghana

Current constituency
- Party: National Democratic Congress
- MP: Mohammed Sherif Abdul Khaliq

Nanton is one of the constituencies represented in the Parliament of Ghana. It elects one member of parliament (MP) by the first-past-the-post system of election. Nanton is located in the Northern Region of Ghana.

This constituency was carved out of the Savelugu-Nanton District Assembly as one of the 38 newly created and upgraded District Assemblies in 2018.

The current member of Parliament for the constituency is Mohammed Sherif Abdul-Khaliq. He was elected on the ticket of the National Democratic Congress and won a majority of votes more than candidate closest in the race, to win the constituency election to become the MP. He succeeded Alhaji Alhassan Yakubu who had represented the constituency in the 4th Republican parliament on the ticket of the National Democratic Congress. Ibrahim Mohammed Murtala is the NDC parliamentary candidate for the 2012 elections in the Nanton Constituency. He has been tipped by many to win the seat in the elections.

== Members of Parliament ==
Election	Member	Party
1996	Alhassan Yakubu	National Democratic Congress
2000	Alhassan Yakubu	National Democratic Congress
2004	Alhassan Yakubu	National Democratic Congress
2008	Iddrisu Abdul-Kareem	New Patriotic Party
2012	Ibrahim Murtala Muhammed	National Democratic Congress
2016	Mohammed Hardi Tufeiru	New Patriotic Party
2020	Mohammed Hardi Tufeiru	New Patriotic Party

== Elections ==
The following table shows the parliamentary election results for Nanton constituency in the 1996 Ghanaian general election.

1996 Ghanaian general election: Nanton Source:Ghana Home Page
Party	Candidate	Votes	%	±%
National Democratic Congress	Alhassan Yakubu	6,682	48.80	—
New Patriotic Party	Tia Alhassan	2,917	21.30	—
Convention People's Party	Ibrahim Dawud	1,353	9.90	—
Majority		6,682	48.80	—

The table below shows the parliamentary election results for Nanton constituency during the 2000 Ghanaian general election.

2000 Ghanaian general election: Nanton Source:Ghana Home Page
Party	Candidate	Votes	%	±%
National Democratic Congress	Alhassan Yakubu	5,659	50.50	—
New Patriotic Party	Iddrisu Abdul-Kareem	4,642	41.40	—
Convention People's Party	E. Abu Alhassan	447	4.00	—
NRP	Inusah A. Azindoo	447	4.00	—
PNC	Mohammed A Nashiru	89	0.80	—
UGM	Yakubu Abdulai	45	0.40	—
Majority		5,659	50.50	—

The below table shows the parliamentary election results for Nanton constituency in the 2004 Ghanaian general election.

2004 Ghanaian general election: Nanton Source:Ghana Home Page
Party	Candidate	Votes	%	±%
National Democratic Congress	Alhassan Yakubu	8,338	58.50	—
New Patriotic Party	Iddrisu Abdul-Kareem	5,778	40.60	—
Convention People's Party	Abu Alhassan	132	0.90	—
Majority		8,338	58.50	—

The following table shows the parliamentary election results for Nanton constituency in the 2008 Ghanaian general election.

2008 Ghanaian general election: Nanton Source:Ghana Home Page
Party	Candidate	Votes	%	±%
New Patriotic Party	Iddrisu Abdul-Kareem	6,868	46.12	—
National Democratic Congress	Alhassan Yakubu	6,177	41.48	—
Convention People's Party	Iddi Alhassan Shitobu	1,630	10.95	—
DFP	Ibrahim Mansuro Cheno	117	0.79	—
PNC	Yakubu Abdulai	100	0.67	—
Majority		6,868	46.12	—

The table below shows the parliamentary election results for Nanton constituency during the 2012 Ghanaian general election.

2012 Ghanaian general election: Nanton Source:Ghana Home Page
Party	Candidate	Votes	%	±%
National Democratic Congress	Ibrahim Murtala Muhammed	10,369	52.66	—
New Patriotic Party	Iddrisu Abdul-Kareem	8,667	44.02	—
Progressive People's Party	Iddi Alhassan Shitobu	654	3.32	—
Majority		10,369	52.66	—

The following table shows the parliamentary election results for Nanton constituency in the 2016 Ghanaian general election.

2016 Ghanaian general election: Nanton Source:Ghana Home Page
Party	Candidate	Votes	%	±%
New Patriotic Party	Mohammed Hardi Tufeiru	11,346	51.84	—
National Democratic Congress	Ibrahim Murtala Muhammed	10,451	47.75	—
Convention People's Party	Alhassan Mohammed Awal	90	0.40	—
Majority		11,346	51.84	—

The following table shows the parliamentary election results for 2020 Ghanaian general election.

2020 Ghanaian general election: Nanton Source:Ghana Home Page
Party	Candidate	Votes	%	±%
New Patriotic Party	Mohammed Hardi Tufeiru	16,000	56.03	—
National Democratic Congress	Salifu Yakubu	12,554	43.97	—
Majority		16,000	56.03	—

== See also ==
- List of Ghana Parliament constituencies
