= Tamale, Ghana =

City in Northern Region, Ghana

Tamale
- City
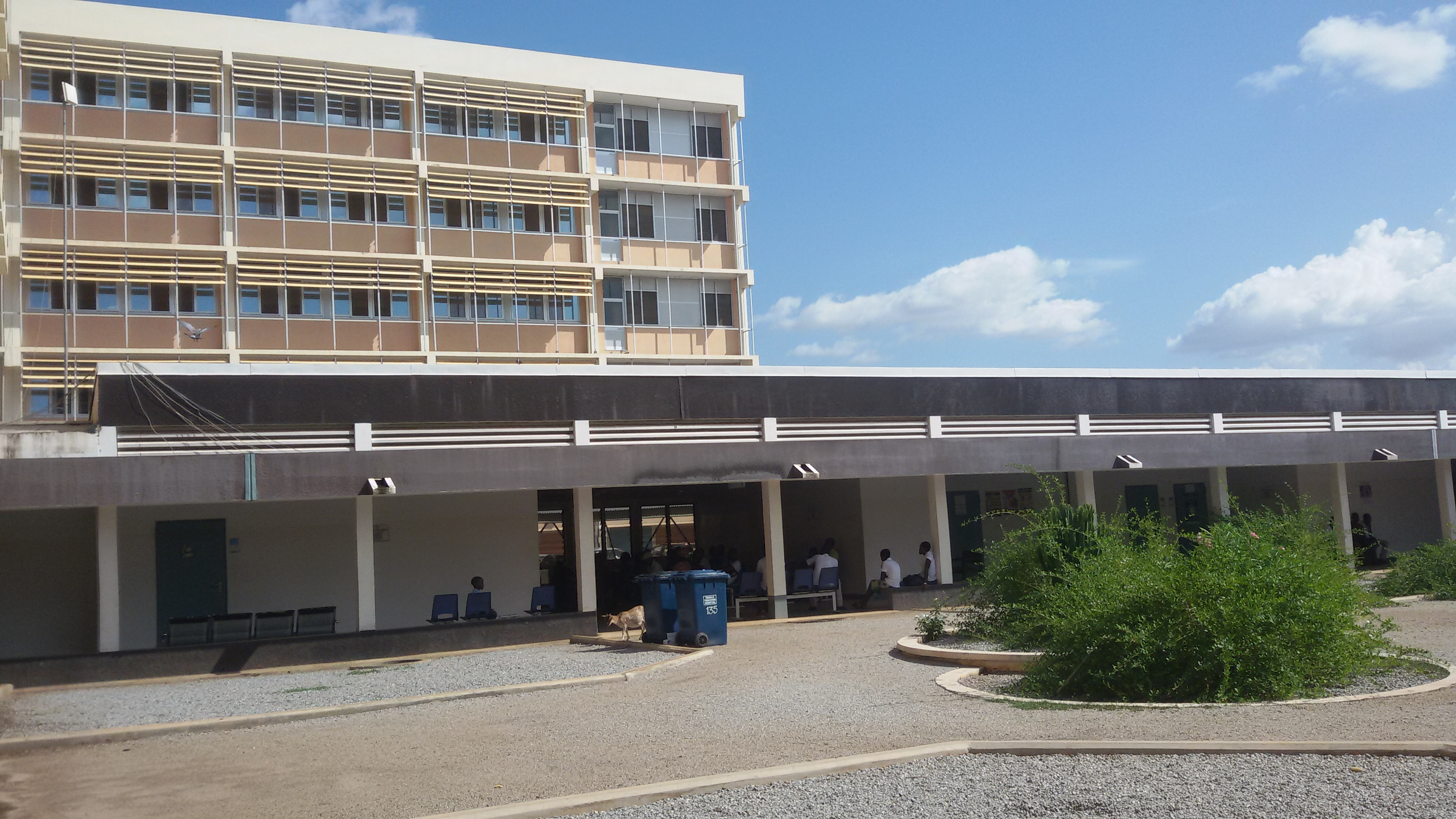
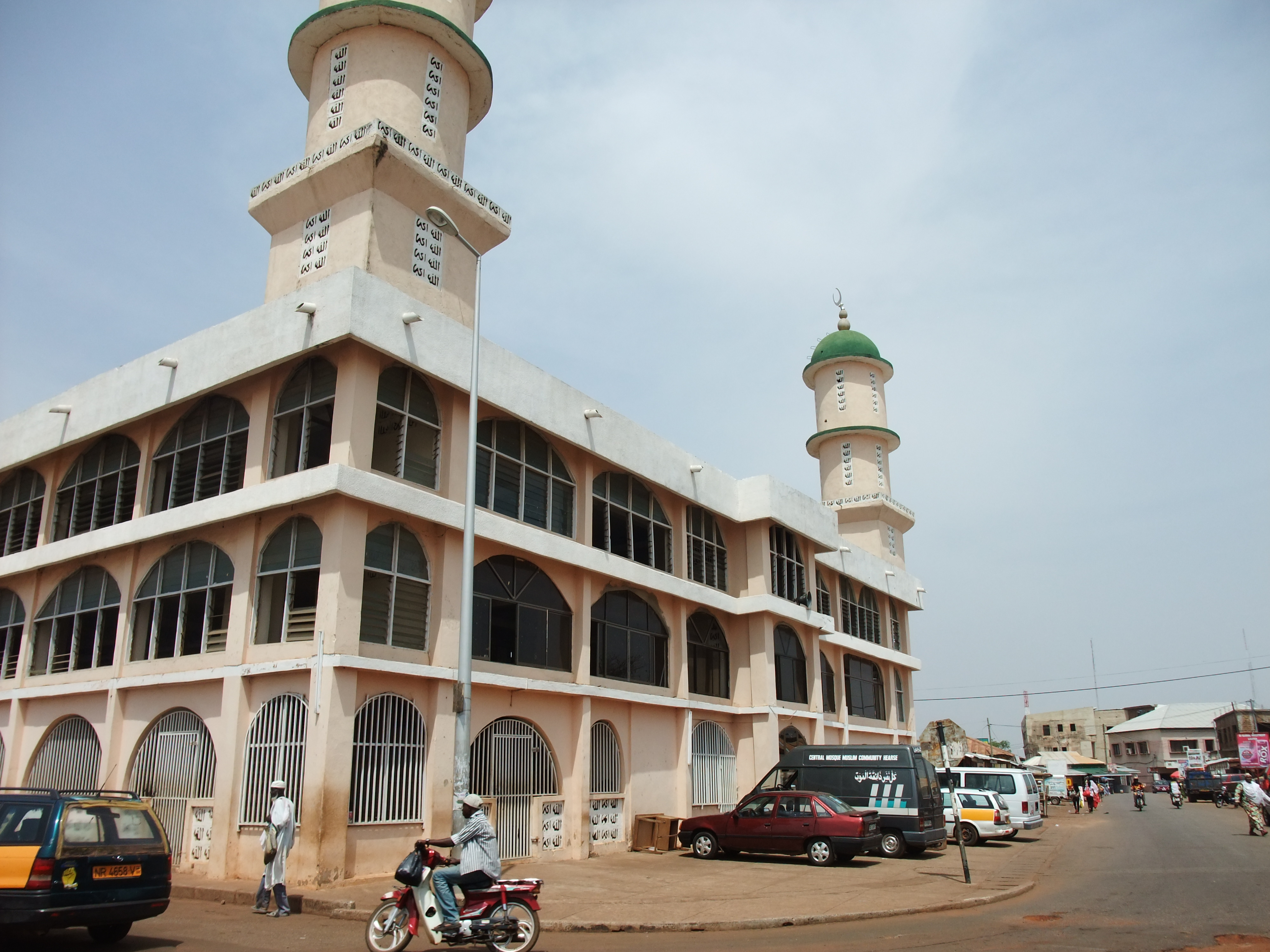
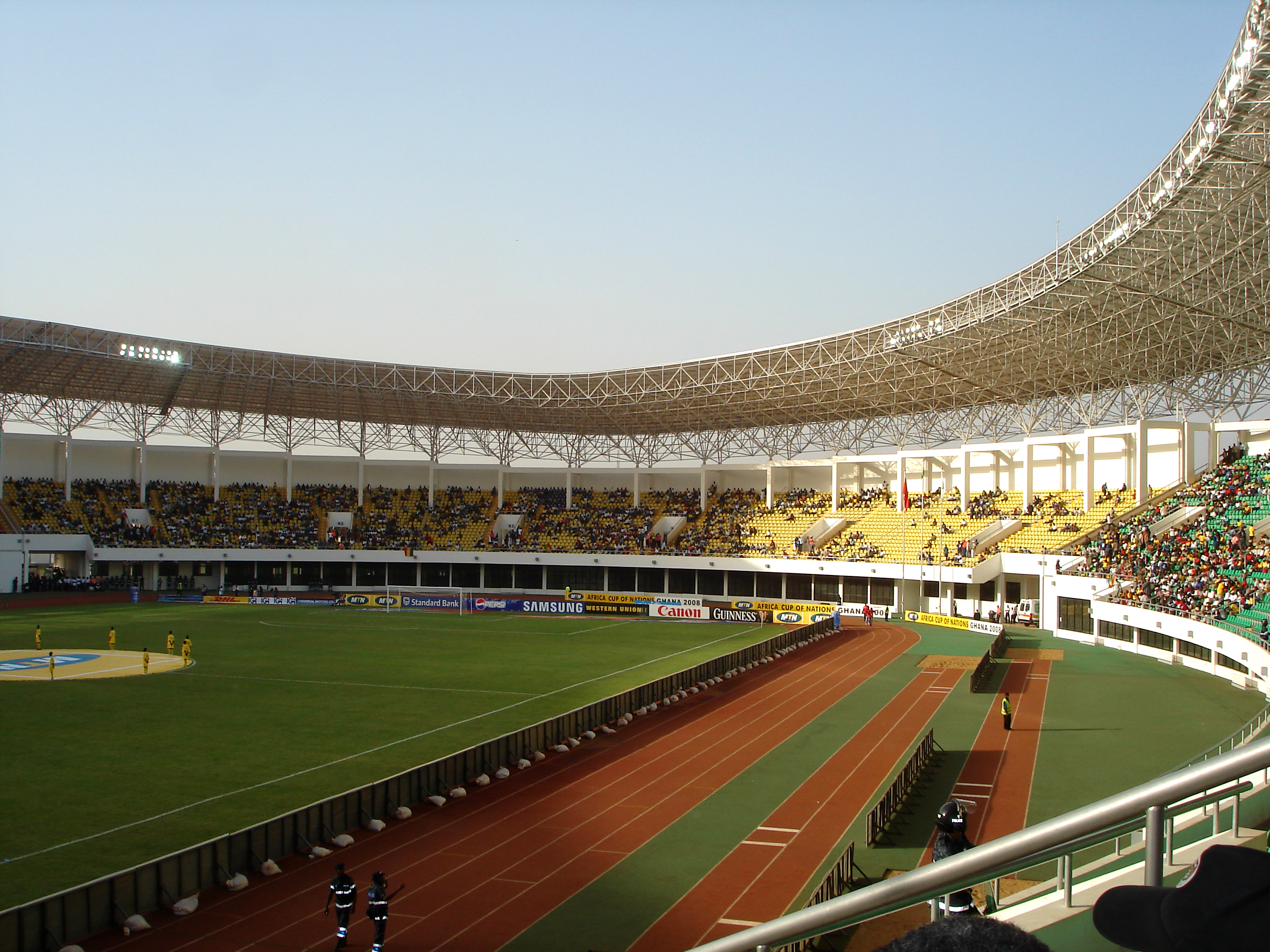
- Counter-Clockwise from top: entrance to Tamale Teaching Hospital, view of Tamale Central Mosque, Aliu Mahama Sports Stadium

- Location of Tamale in Northern region, Dagbon Tamale (Africa)
- Coordinates: 09°24′27″N 00°51′12″W
- Country: Ghana
- Region: Northern Region
- District: Tamale Metropolitan District
- Established: 1906

Government
  - Type: Mayor-Council
  - Metropolitan chief: Abu Takoro

Area
  - Total: 750 km^{2} (290 sq mi)
- Elevation: 151 m (495 ft)

Population (2021)
  - Total: 374,744
  - Density: 1,282.3/km^{2} (3,321/sq mi)
  - Ethnicities: Dagomba; Guan; Mamprusi; Akan
  - Religions: Islam; Christianity; Spirituality; Traditional African religions
- Time zone: UTC
- Postal codes: NT0000 - NT2701
- area code: 037
- Climate: Aw
- Website: tamalemetro.gov.gh

Tamale (Dagbani: [ˈtamali]) is the capital city of the Northern Region of Ghana. It is Ghana's third largest city, with a population of 374,744 people (185,051 males and 189,693 females) as of the 2021 population census). The city has been ranked as the fastest-growing city in West Africa. Tamale is located in the Kingdom of Dagbon, Ghana's oldest Kingdom. It is traditionally inhabited by Dagombas, and other current residents are Gonja, Mamprusi Nanumba, Konkomba and Akan. As of 2025, the Mayor is Hon. Abu Takoro.

The city grew from a small village to an important economic center in the Northern Territories after the British government established administrative headquarters in the area. It became the capital of the Northern Region in 1960. The local economy is based on agriculture, followed by trading, teaching, and manufactures.

Economic activities in Tamale revolve around farming and trading.

== History ==
=== Early settlement ===
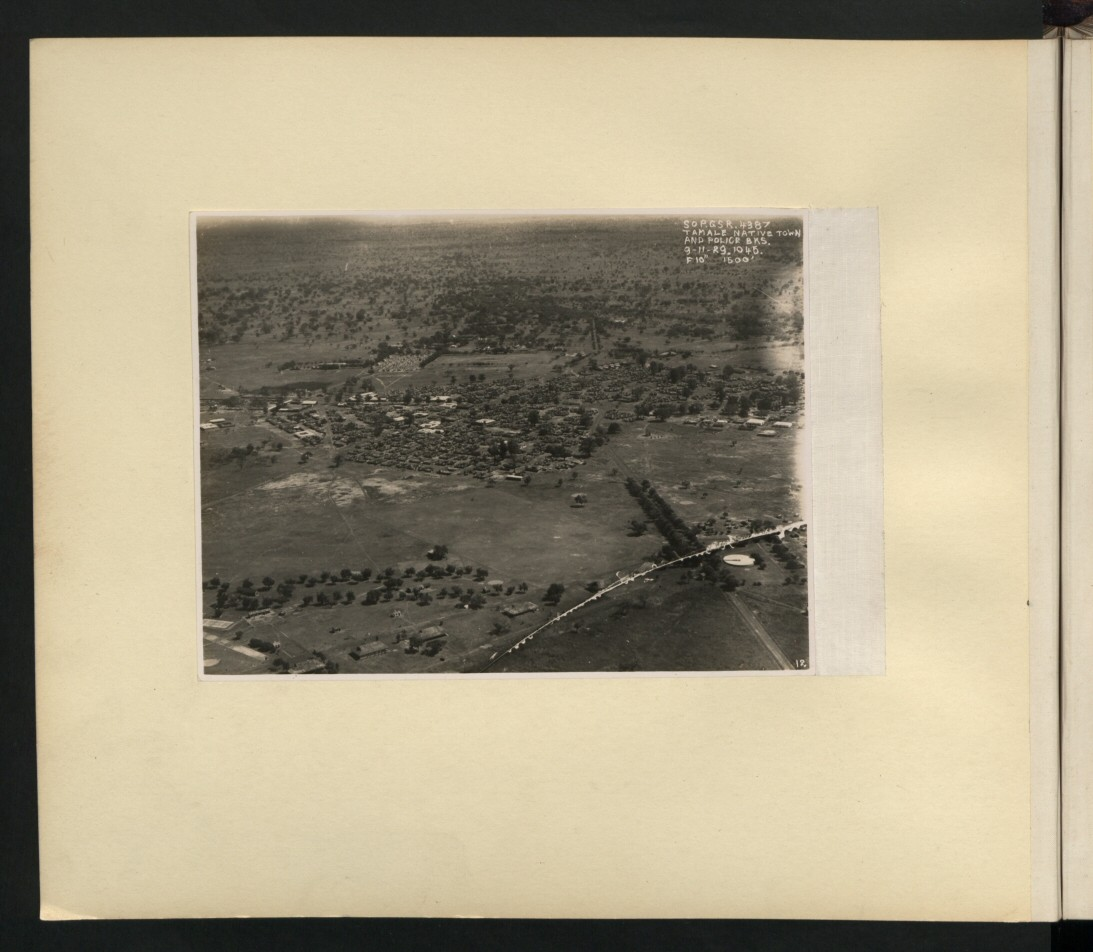
Aerial view of Tamale and police barracks in 1929

The area of Tamale used to consist of small villages, which were under the kingdom of Dagbon. it was a popular destination of cattle trails in the region. In 1907, the British decided to establish administrative headquarters in the area with help from the Dakpema after German officials have taken over Yendi. With the addition of a road in 1920, nicknamed the 'Great North Road', Tamale turned into an important center of business in the Northern Territories.

Throughout the 20th century, the population of Tamale was growing rapidly of people looking for abundant water supply and electricity. This have resulted in massive amounts of land used for infrastructure, threatening residents ability to farm. During this time, a series of disputes between the Gulkpe Na (Note: The Gulkpe naa is one of the seven district chiefs in Dagbon; in rank directly under the Paramount Chief, he overlooks the local chiefs in and around Tamale) and the Dakpema for power in Tamale occurred. This is in part due to the British incorporated indirect rule in the town, resulting in the imbalance of power between the chiefs. Although local councils were introduced and indirect rule was discontinued, tension between the chiefs continues even to this day.

In 1960, Tamale became the capital of the Northern Region after the region had separated from the rest of the north.

=== 21st century ===
==== Lamashegu shooting ====
On 13 February 2022 at approximately 1:00 p.m., Ghana Police officers clashed with youth in Lamashegu, a community in Tamale, due to them driving off after allegedly riding in an unregistered vehicle. This resulted in one person, Abdul Hakim Yakubu, being killed and 8 others getting injured.

== Economy ==
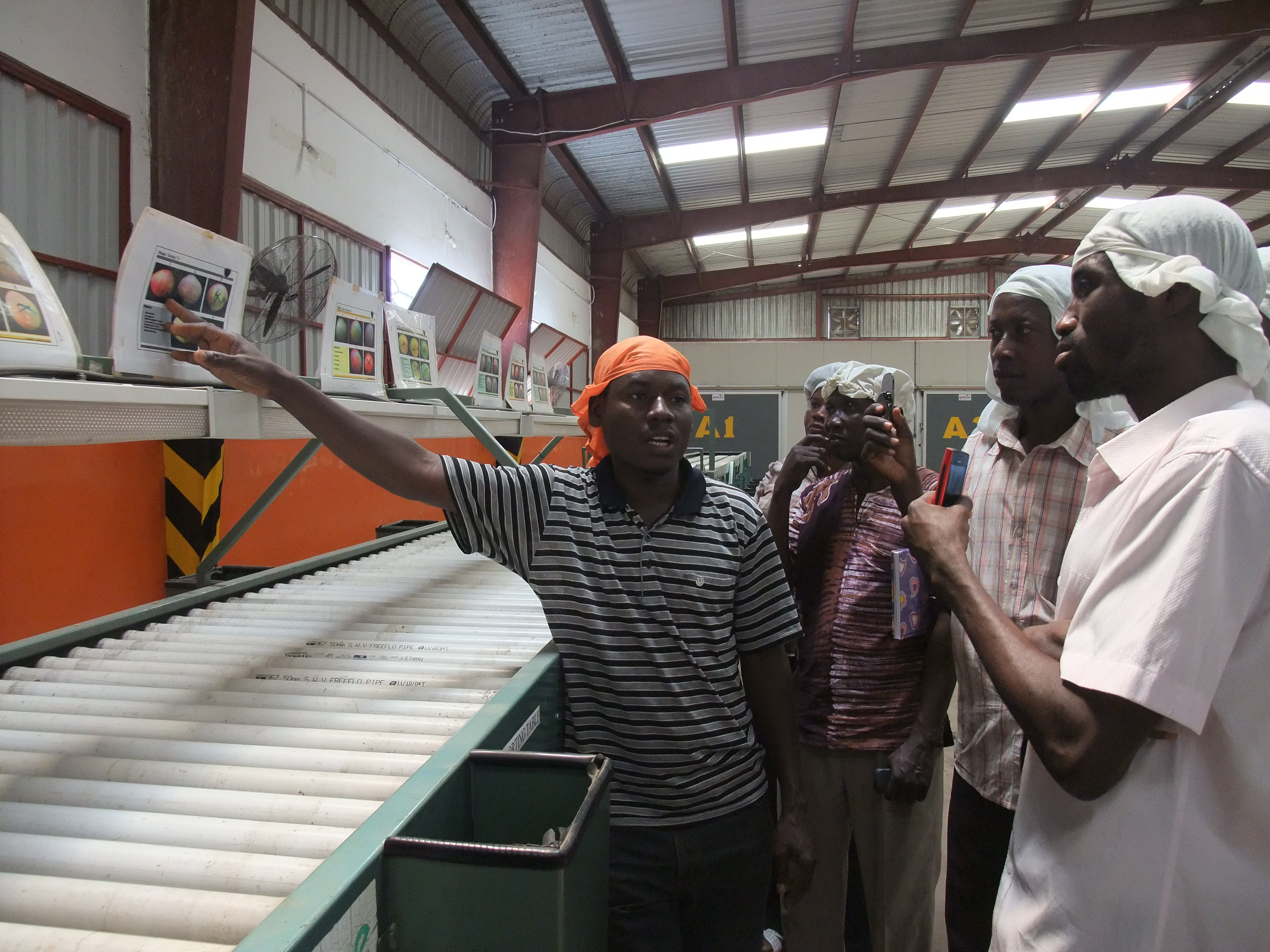
An agriculture factory in Tamale

Historically ruled by a rural agriculture system, Tamale's economy in recent times have diversified into many different sectors. Most of Tamale's population is employed in agriculture, although the common droughts in the region have threatened this sector. Other popular sectors including trading, teaching, and manufacturing. Even though the economy is considered diverse, Tamale suffers from a high unemployment rate and high rates of poverty. There is also a small amount of NGOs operating in the city.

== Demographics ==
Historical population
| Year | Pop. | ±% |
|---|---|---|
| 1921* | 3,800 | — |
| 1931* | 13,000 | +242.1% |
| 1948* | 14,500 | +11.5% |
| 1960 | 40,443 | +178.9% |
| 1970 | 84,653 | +109.3% |
| 1984 | 135,952 | +60.6% |
| 2010 | 371,351 | +173.1% |
| 2021 | 374,744 | +0.9% |
*Estimate; Source: Ghana Statistical Service.

As of the 2010 census, Tamale has a population of 371,351 people, a 60.6% increase from the last census. The city is made up of many different ethnic groups with the majority being the Dagombas. Other groups who lived in the area include the Gonjas, Mamprusis, Akan, Dagaabas and other groups from the Upper East Region. 90.5% of the population are Muslims, followed by Christians, spiritualists and traditionalists.

== Administration ==
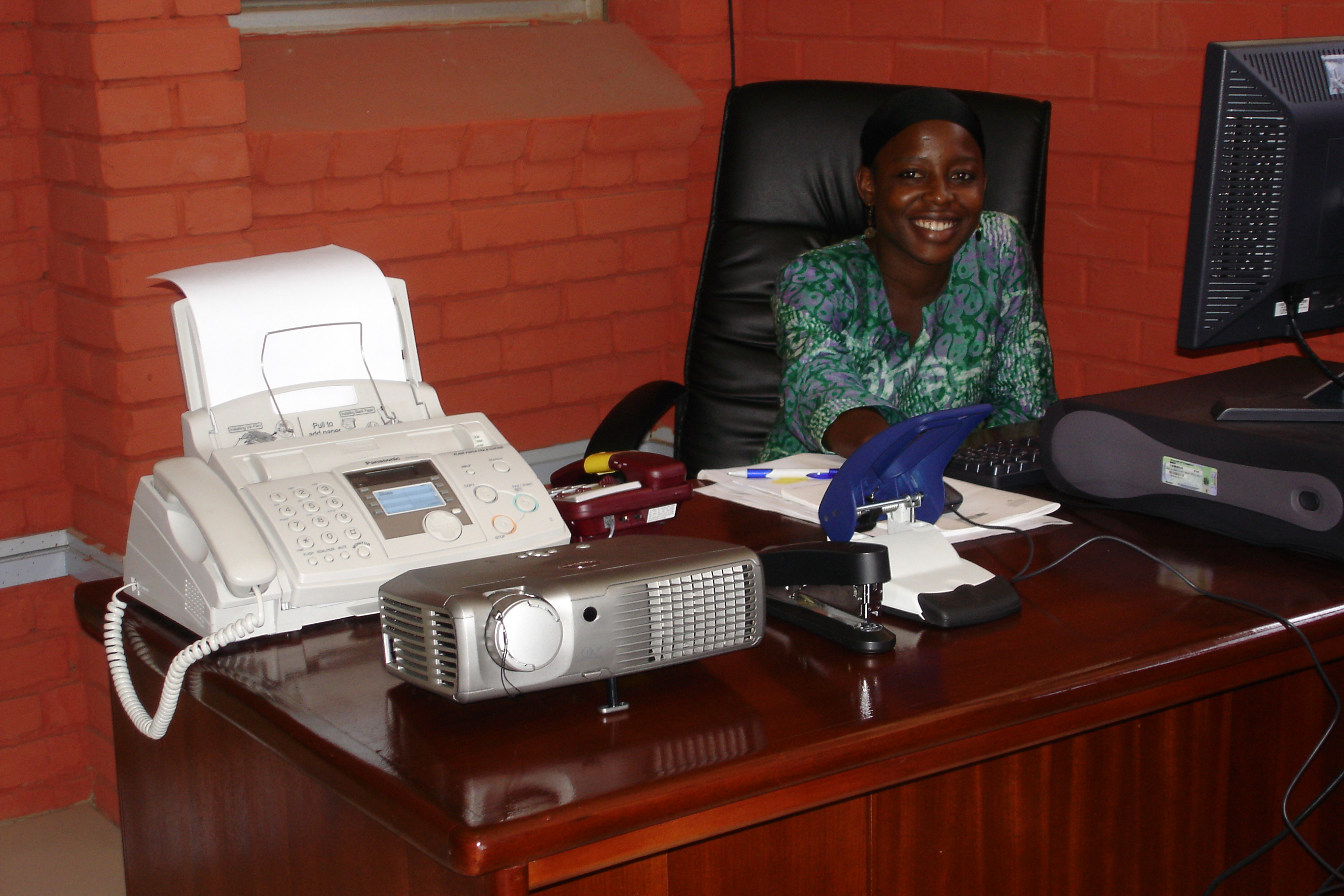
Tamale Metropolitan District's office

Although Tamale doesn't have a mayor on its own, the municipal has a mayor–council form of government. The mayor is appointed by the president of Ghana and approved by the town council, the Tamale Metropolitan Assembly. Although, suggestions have been made by residents to increase accountability of the office by having the mayor elected.

== Culture ==
Tamale is home to a culture center which showcases arts and tribes from all over the region. The Dagbamba people performed dances such as the Baamaya and Tora, with each having its own meaning behind it. Some annual festivals celebrated in the city are the Bugum chugu, Damba festival, Eid ul-Fitr, Eid Adha.

== Education ==
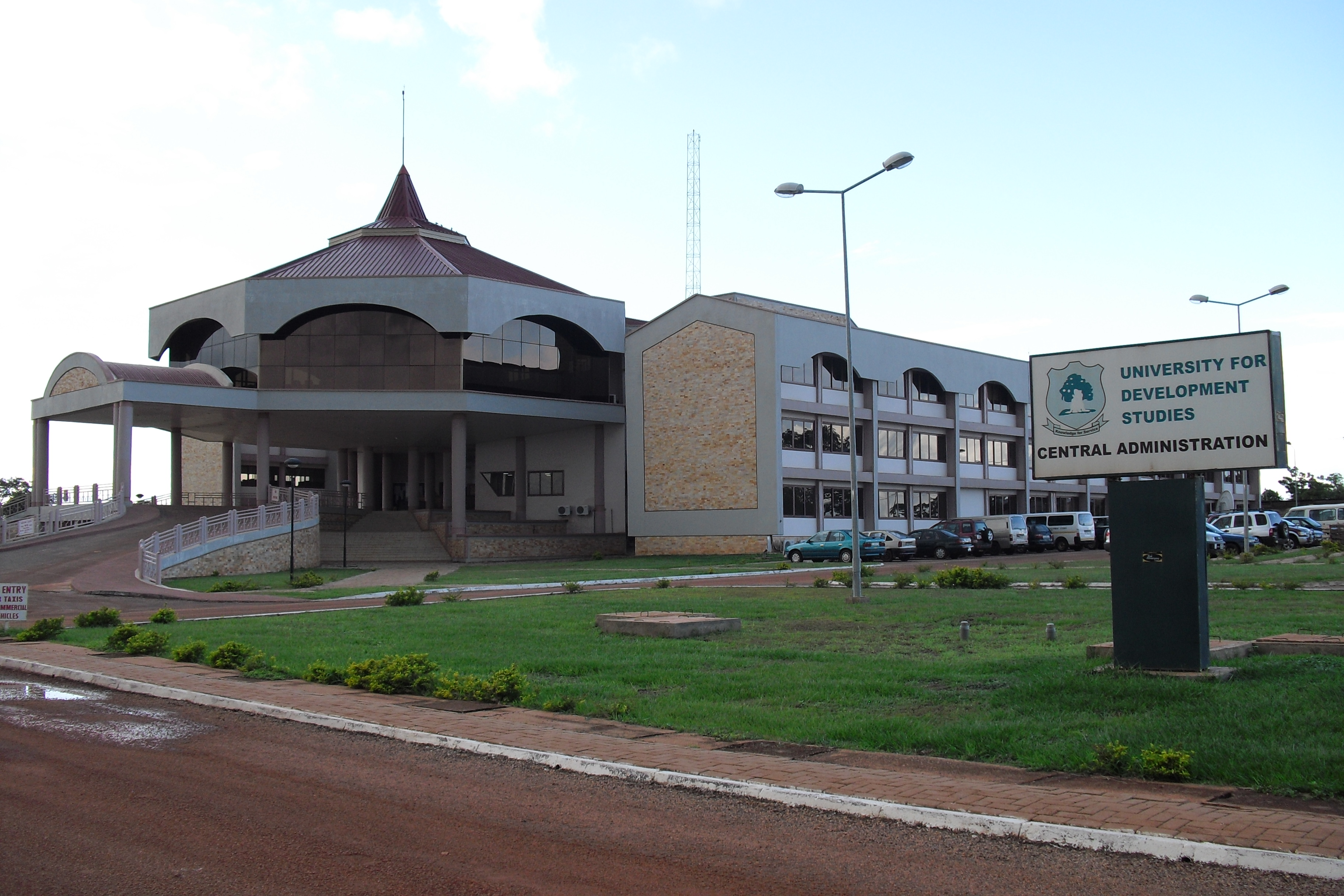
University for Development Studies (UDS)

The first education institution in the city was a teacher training college in 1944 followed by a secondary school in 1951. Due to the British wanting to keep the Northern Territories strictly agricultural and pastoral, education growth in the city was hindered. Besides that, Tamale eventually became the educational hub of Northern Ghana. Education Ridge, a suburb in Tamale, is known for being the location of multiple schools crammed into a small area of 3 km^{2} (1.2 mi^{2}).

The following is a list of senior high schools, colleges, and universities in Tamale:

| Institution | Type | Status |
|---|---|---|
Senior High Schools
| St. Charles Minor Seminary Senior High School | Public | Active |
| Tamale Senior High School (TAMASCO) | Public | Active |
| Ghana Senior High School (GHANASCO) | Public | Active |
| Tamale Islamic Science Senior High School | Public | Active |
| Tamale Girls Senior High School | Public | Active |
| Northern School of Business (NOBISCO) | Public | Active |
| Kalpohin Senior High School | Public | Active |
| Viting Senior High School | Public | Active |
| Abubakar Sidiq Senior High School | Private | Active |
Colleges and Universities
| Bagabaga College of Education | Public | Active |
| Tamale College of Education | Public | Active |
| University for Development Studies | Public | Active |
| Tamale Technical University | Public | Active |

== Transportation ==
=== Air ===
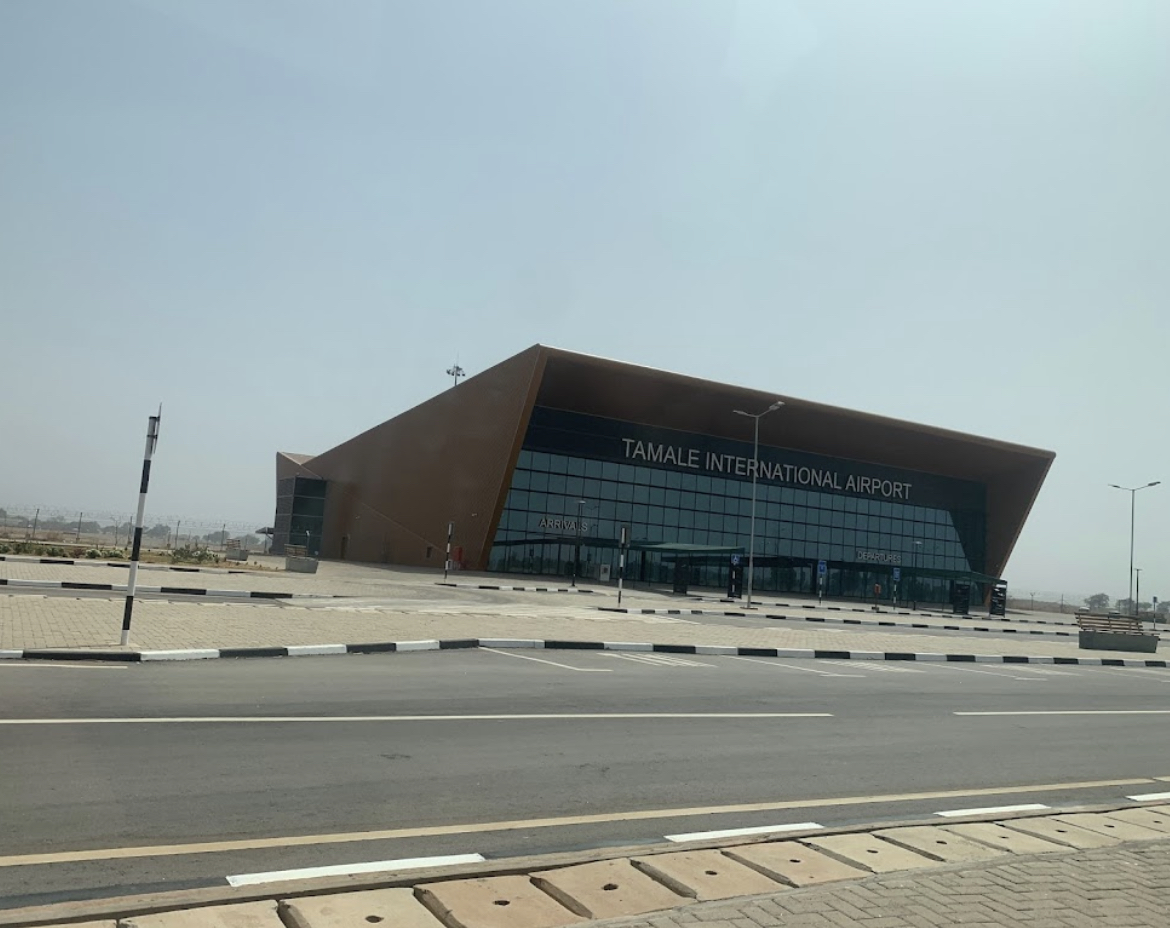
Roadside view of Tamale International Airport

Tamale is served by Tamale International Airport. Located about 11 km (6 nmi; 7 mi) from downtown Tamale, the airport is mainly used by commercial airlines such as Africa World Airlines and Passion Air which are the only operational companies as of 2024. They run regular flights between Tamale and Accra's Accra International Airport, along with other regional capitals.

=== Rapid transport ===
There are public transports from Tamale to major cities such as Kumasi, Accra, Mim, Ahafo, Cape Coast, Sunyani, Takoradi, Tema, Ho, Wa, Bolgatanga, Elubo, Aflao, and Techiman. They are operated by Tamale's bus rapid transit system, tro-tro, MetroMass, STC Bus Lines, and other privately owned bus companies.

=== Buses and taxis ===
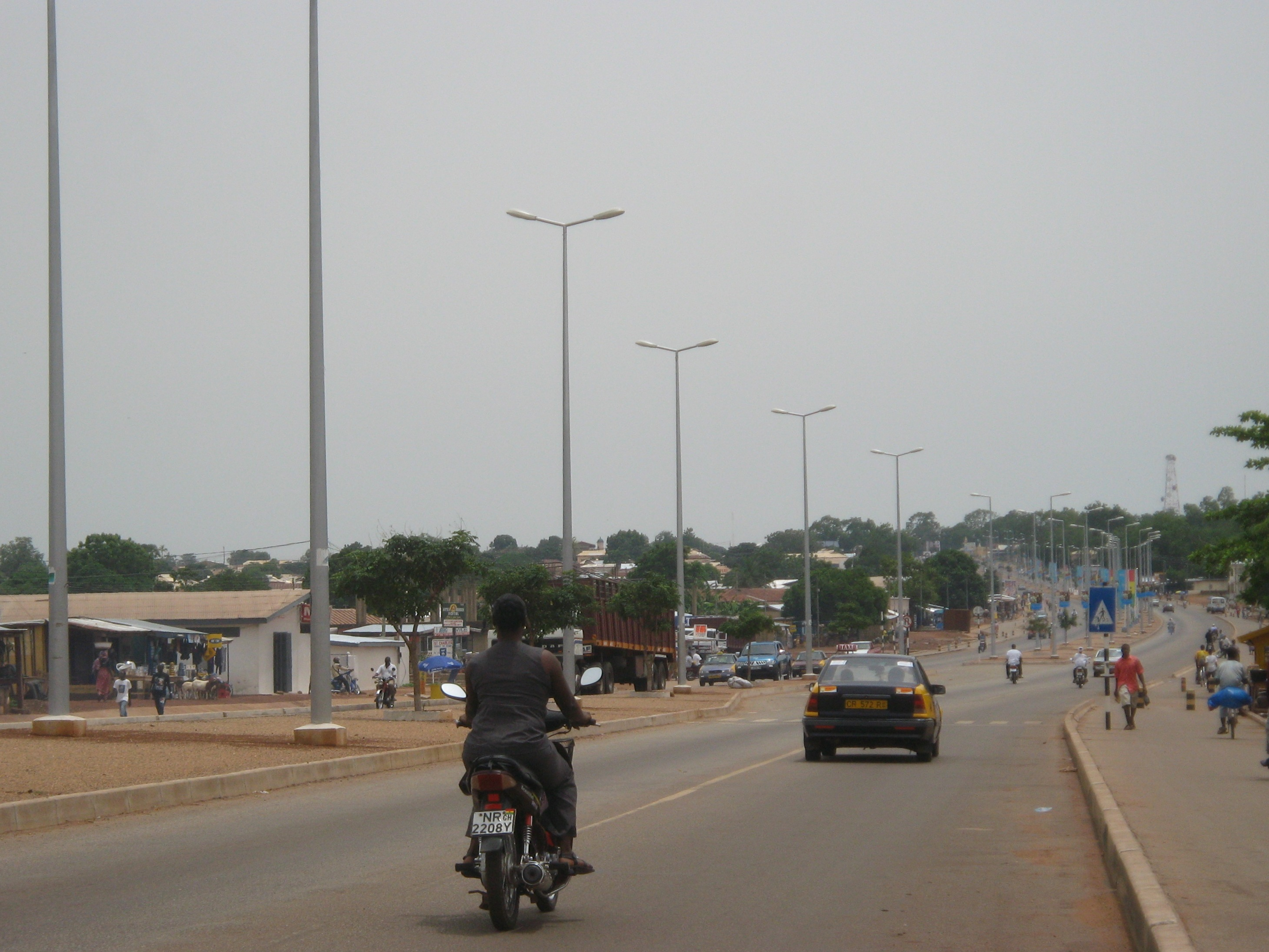
View of a high street in Tamale

Taxis in the past used to be one of the most popular means of getting around Tamale for visitors to the town until the arrival of the tricycles, popularly called 'Mahama-Cambuu' or 'yellow-yellow'. It rise to popularity due to being cheaper than the taxi despite being more dangerous. The popular means of travel for locals however is by motorbike. Motorbikes are the most used means of transport for the locals. In 2024, a record of 600,032 locals possess motorbikes. Another means of transport are huge buses such as intercity STC, VIP, VVIP among others and these buses are being used every day.

== Geography ==
=== Metropolitan area ===
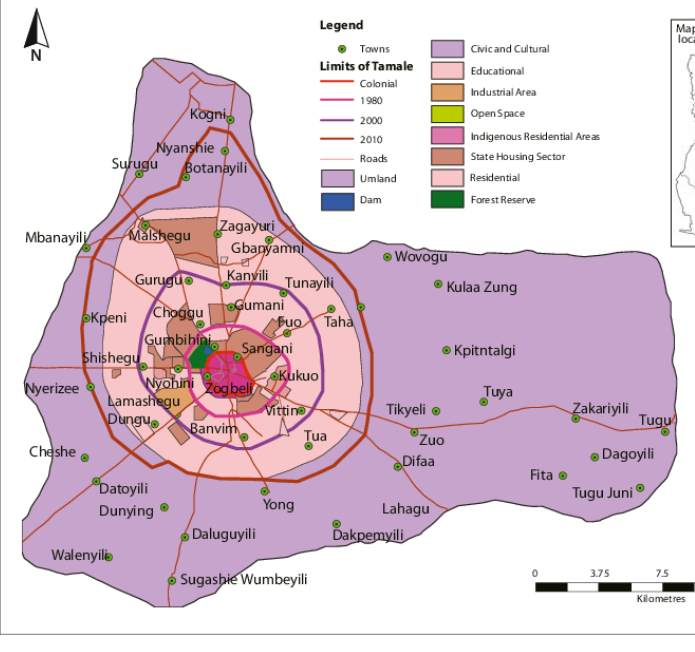
Map of Tamale Metropolitan District

Tamale is located in Tamale Metropolitan District, which has an area of about 647 km^{2} (250 sq mi). The district bordered the Sagnarigu District to the west and north, Mion District towards the east, East Gonja District to the south and the Central Gonja District towards the southwest.

=== Climate ===
Tamale

Climate chart (precipitation, max. and min. temperature)
| J | F | M | A | M | J | J | A | S | O | N | D |
| 3.2 36 20 | 10 38 23 | 35 39 26 | 82 37 26 | 114 35 25 | 140 32 24 | 178 31 23 | 189 30 23 | 206 31 23 | 106 34 23 | 6 37 22 | 3.4 36 20 |
- █ Average max. and min. temperatures in °C
- █ Precipitation totals in mm
- Source: BBC Weather
Imperial conversion
| J | F | M | A | M | J | J | A | S | O | N | D |
| 0.1 97 67 | 0.4 101 74 | 1.4 102 79 | 3.2 99 79 | 4.5 94 77 | 5.5 90 75 | 7 87 74 | 7.5 86 73 | 8.1 88 73 | 4.2 92 73 | 0.2 98 72 | 0.1 97 67 |
- █ Average max. and min. temperatures in °F
- █ Precipitation totals in inches

Tamale has a tropical savanna climate (Köppen climate classification Aw). The metropolis usually only experiences one rainy season a year, effecting staple crop farming. During the rainy season, it comes with tiny sunshine with heavy thunderstorms. The mean monthly rainfall is about 89 mm (3.5 in) within 95 days of rainfall in the form of tropical showers. The mean monthly temperatures is on average around 34 °C (93 °F) while the minimum monthly temperatures are around 23 °C (73 °F). The relative humidity in the city is usually the lowest between December and March at 30% while around August it is the highest at 70%.

==== Climate change ====
Climate change is threatening the livelihoods of Tamale residents due to droughts, floods, and heatwaves becoming more common. This hinders farmers ability to farm because they need consistent rainfall for their crops to survive. There are national policies and intervention from NGOs to make sure that the impact from climate change in the area is minimal.

Climate data for Tamale (1991–2020)
| Month | Jan | Feb | Mar | Apr | May | Jun | Jul | Aug | Sep | Oct | Nov | Dec | Year |
|---|---|---|---|---|---|---|---|---|---|---|---|---|---|
| Record high °C (°F) | 41.7 (107.1) | 42.8 (109.0) | 42.5 (108.5) | 41.8 (107.2) | 40.5 (104.9) | 37.6 (99.7) | 35.6 (96.1) | 35.4 (95.7) | 35.4 (95.7) | 38.2 (100.8) | 40.1 (104.2) | 39.4 (102.9) | 42.8 (109.0) |
| Mean daily maximum °C (°F) | 36.0 (96.8) | 38.2 (100.8) | 38.9 (102.0) | 37.0 (98.6) | 34.6 (94.3) | 32.2 (90.0) | 30.6 (87.1) | 30.2 (86.4) | 31.2 (88.2) | 33.6 (92.5) | 36.5 (97.7) | 36.3 (97.3) | 34.6 (94.3) |
| Daily mean °C (°F) | 27.9 (82.2) | 30.1 (86.2) | 30.9 (87.6) | 29.8 (85.6) | 28.6 (83.5) | 26.8 (80.2) | 26.0 (78.8) | 25.8 (78.4) | 25.9 (78.6) | 27.3 (81.1) | 28.2 (82.8) | 27.5 (81.5) | 27.9 (82.2) |
| Mean daily minimum °C (°F) | 19.5 (67.1) | 23.1 (73.6) | 26.2 (79.2) | 26.1 (79.0) | 25.1 (77.2) | 23.7 (74.7) | 23.3 (73.9) | 23.0 (73.4) | 22.7 (72.9) | 23.0 (73.4) | 22.0 (71.6) | 19.5 (67.1) | 23.1 (73.6) |
| Record low °C (°F) | 10.5 (50.9) | 15.8 (60.4) | 18.6 (65.5) | 20.0 (68.0) | 19.2 (66.6) | 18.9 (66.0) | 19.3 (66.7) | 19.8 (67.6) | 19.0 (66.2) | 19.2 (66.6) | 13.1 (55.6) | 12.2 (54.0) | 10.5 (50.9) |
| Average precipitation mm (inches) | 3.2 (0.13) | 10.4 (0.41) | 34.9 (1.37) | 82.1 (3.23) | 114.4 (4.50) | 139.7 (5.50) | 178.1 (7.01) | 189.3 (7.45) | 206.1 (8.11) | 106.2 (4.18) | 6.0 (0.24) | 3.4 (0.13) | 1,073.8 (42.28) |
| Average precipitation days (≥ 1.0 mm) | 0.2 | 0.9 | 2.4 | 4.8 | 7.2 | 9.5 | 10.5 | 11.7 | 14.3 | 8.8 | 0.6 | 0.2 | 71.1 |
| Average relative humidity (%) | 27 | 32 | 45 | 61 | 70 | 77 | 80 | 79 | 80 | 74 | 59 | 40 | 60 |
| Mean monthly sunshine hours | 238.7 | 219.8 | 229.3 | 232.6 | 233.1 | 208.1 | 173.2 | 158.0 | 175.8 | 252.1 | 262.2 | 253.3 | 2,636.2 |
| Mean daily sunshine hours | 8.6 | 8.4 | 8.1 | 7.7 | 8.0 | 6.8 | 5.2 | 4.5 | 5.2 | 8.4 | 9.4 | 8.8 | 7.4 |
Source 1: NOAA
Source 2: Deutscher Wetterdienst (mean temperature, humidity, daily sunshine hours 1961-1990)

== Healthcare ==
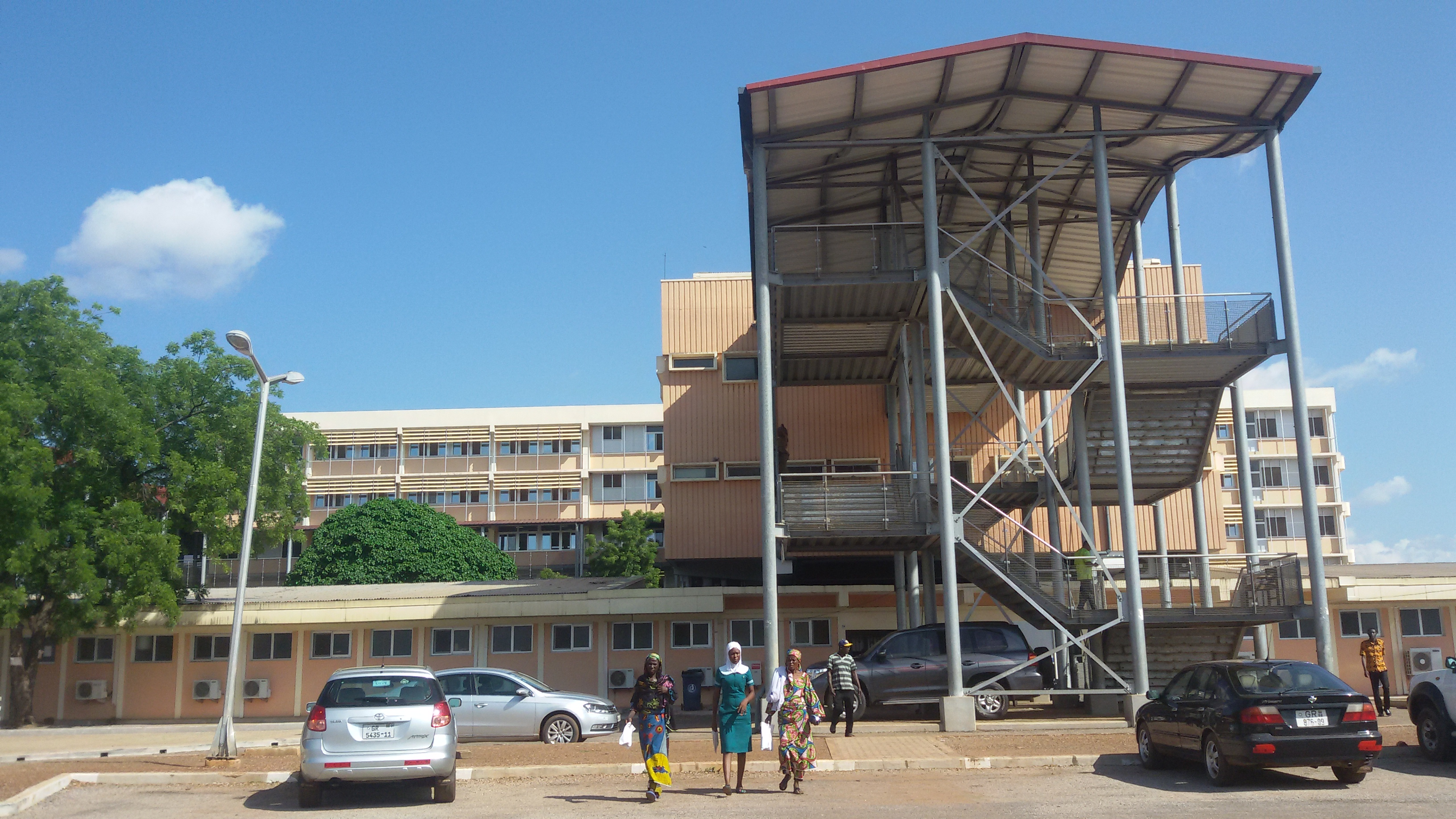
Tamale Teaching Hospital

The city is home to the Tamale Teaching Hospital, which helps to handle health related issues for the whole region. It is the 3rd largest hospital in the country. It also offers undergraduate and graduate programs in medicine, nursing, and nutrition.

== Sports ==
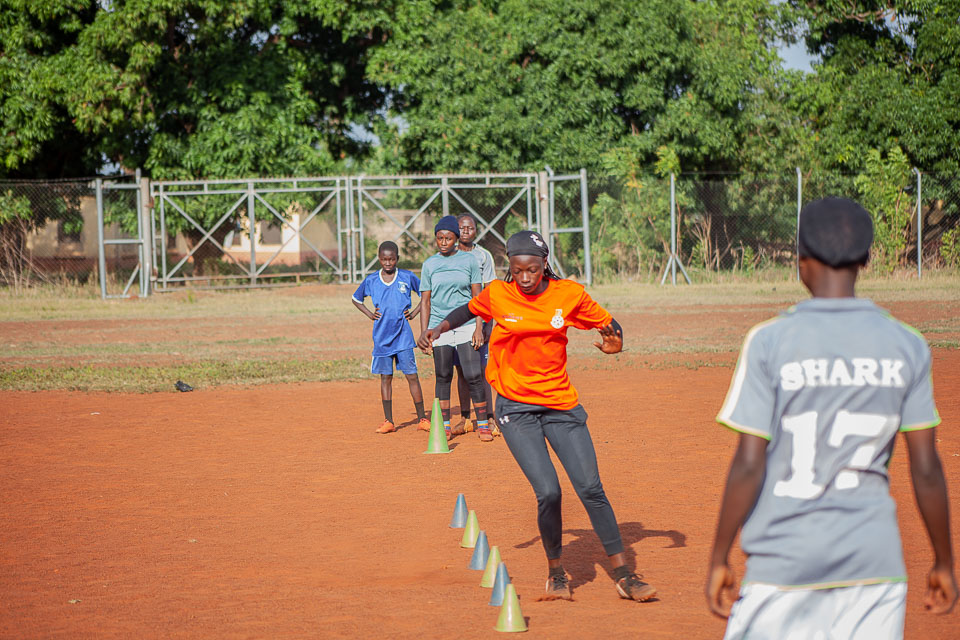
Football players training on a field in Tamale

Tamale is home to Real Tamale United along with other smaller clubs. They played at the Aliu Mahama Sports Stadium (formerly Tamale Sports Stadium), which was the location of some of the matches played during the 2008 African Cup of Nations. Due to the state of the stadium, FIFA and CAF have prevented international matches to be play at the facility.

== Media ==
Since the 1970s, modern communication in Tamale is rapid with it being operated by 6 mobile telecommunication companies. There are 11 FM radio stations located in the city.

== Sister cities ==
The following shows the cities that Tamale is twined with:

- Louisville, United States (1979)
- Fada N'Gourma, Burkina Faso (2003)
- Commune II Niamey, Niger (2007)

== Notable people ==
- Mubarak Wakaso, professional footballer
- Haruna Iddrisu, Member of Parliament for Tamale South and the former Minister for Employment and Labour Relations in Ghana, Minority leader of Parliament
- Abdul Majeed Waris, professional footballer
- Fancy Gadam, Afro-pop and dancehall artist
- Mahamudu Bawumia, politician
- Sheikh Bayan Basha, Islamic preacher
- Alhassan Suhiyini, politician
- Inusah Fuseini, politician
- Alhassan Bashir Fuseini, politician
- Mona 4Reall, Socialite, model, musician, and businesswoman
- Maccasio, Hip hop, hip life artist and an entrepreneur
- Ibrahim Mahama, artist
- Seidu Al-Hassan vice chancellor at UDS

== See also ==
- Tamale Central Market
