= Greater Accra metropolitan area =

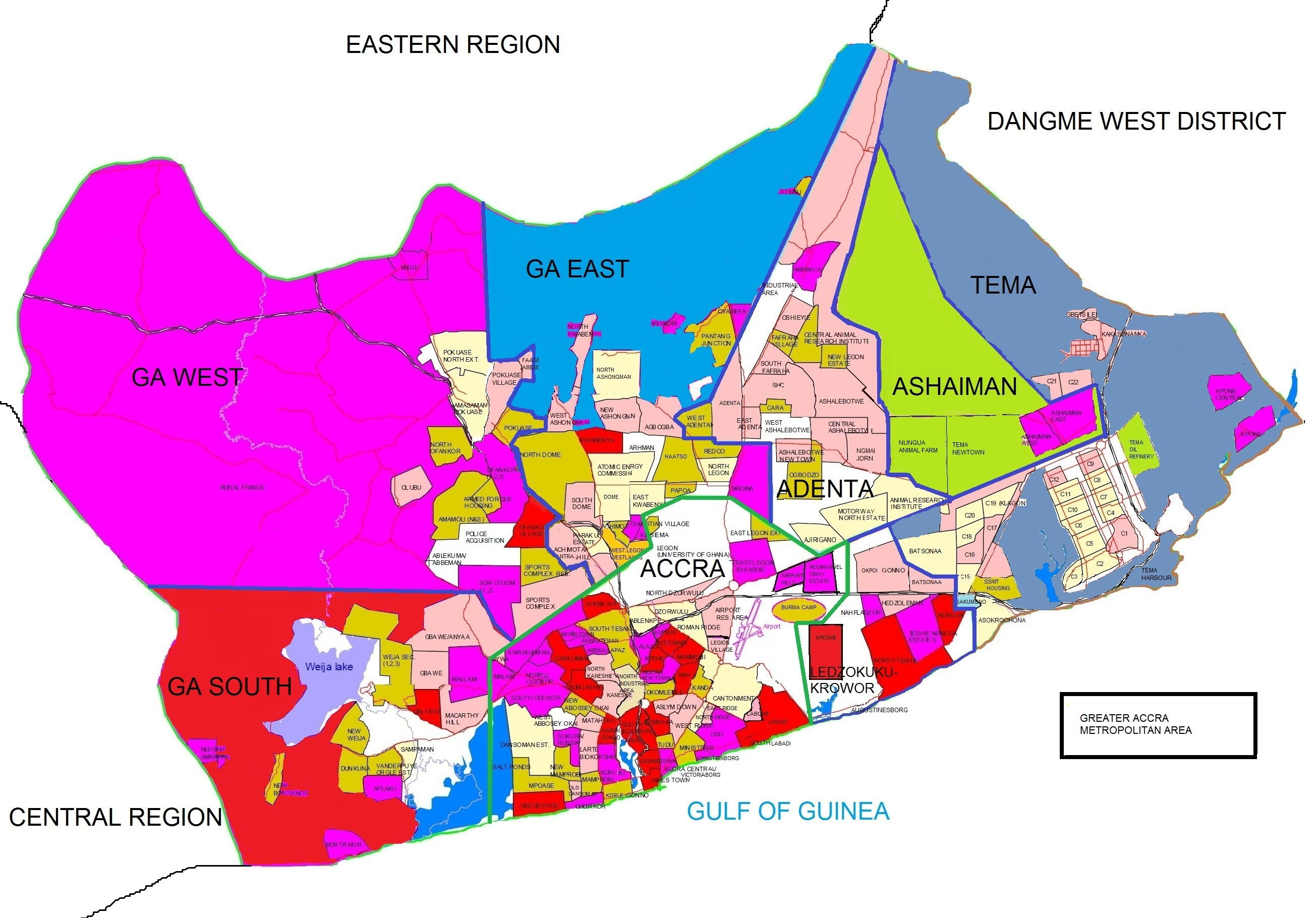
Greater Accra Metropolitan Area in 2008 district boundaries.

The Greater Accra metropolitan area (GAMA) is a metropolitan region centered in Ghana's capital Accra. With around five million inhabitants, the metropolitan area is one of the 90 largest agglomerations in the world. The GAMA is largely continuous, but not identical with the Greater Accra Region.

== Geography ==
The metropolitan region comprises 25 of the total 29 districts within the Greater Accra Region. It borders the Central Region to the west, the Eastern Region to the north, the Shai Osudoku District to the northeast and the Ningo Prampram District to the east.

Included in the metropolitan region are the following districts:

District	Population (2010)	Population (2021)
Ablekuma Central Municipal	233,220	169,145
Ablekuma North Municipal	184,731	159,208
Ablekuma West Municipal	59,708	153,490
Accra Metropolitan	440,946	284,124
Adenta Municipal	78,215	237,546
Ashaiman Municipal	190,972	208,060
Ayawaso Central Municipal	142,322	94,831
Ayawaso East Municipal	83,721	53,004
Ayawaso North Municipal	99,777	63,386
Ayawaso West Municipal	70,667	75,303
Ga Central Municipal	117,220	332,232
Ga East Municipal	147,742	283,379
Ga North Municipal	103,965	235,292
Ga South Municipal	234,191	350,121
Ga West Municipal	101,386	314,299
Korle-Klottey Municipal	121,723	68,633
Kpone Katamanso Municipal	109,864	417,334
Krowor Municipal	102,059	143,012
La Dade Kotopon Municipal	183,528	140,264
La Nkwantanang Madina Municipal	111,926	244,676
Ledzokuku Municipal	125,873	217,304
Okaikwei North Municipal	228,271	160,446
Tema Metropolitan	168,932	177,924
Tema West Municipal	123,841	196,224
Weija Gbawe Municipal	191,623	213,674
Greater Accra Metropolitan Area	3,756,423	4,992,911

== History ==
Before the relocation of the capital of the British crown colony Gold Coast from Cape Coast to Accra in 1877, the region was predominantly rural and consisted of fishing and farming settlements. By 1891, the new capital had developed into an urban area with a population of 20,000. With an area of 300 square kilometers within the official city limits, the capital could not absorb the rapid growth in population and economic activity, so urban development spread to the areas located in the surrounding countryside. In these areas, one could subsequently observe a corresponding increase in demand for land, improved infrastructure and jobs, allowing the suburban areas to gradually merge with the capital. At the same time, this led to a rapid change in the geographic and socioeconomic characteristics of these areas. The areas functionally linked to the capital are currently in various stages of urban transformation, with rural settlements on the one hand, whose residents live mainly from agriculture, and "townships" on the other, from which a significant proportion of residents commute to the capital.

== Economy ==
The Greater Accra metropolitan area is by far the most important economic center in Ghana and accounts for more than half of the nation's economic output and more than a quarter of the national workforce.
