= Weija Gbawe Municipal Assembly =

- Municipal Assembly
- Districts of Greater Accra Region

- Location of Weija Gbawe Municipal Assembly within Greater Accra
- Coordinates: 5°33′59.76″N 0°20′0.6″W
- Country: Ghana
- Region: Greater Accra
- Capital: Weija

Population (2021)
  - Total: 213,674
- Time zone: UTC+0 (GMT)
- ISO 3166 code: GH-AA-WG

Weija Gbawe Municipal Assembly is one of the twenty-nine districts in Greater Accra Region, Ghana. Originally it was formerly part of the then-larger Ga West District in 2004, until the western part of the district was split off to create the first Ga South Municipal Assembly on 29 February 2008, with Weija as its capital town; thus the remaining part was elevated to municipal district assembly status to become Ga West Municipal Assembly. Later, a small portion of the district was split off to create Ga Central Municipal Assembly on 28 June 2012; thus the remaining part has been retained as Ga South Municipal District. However, on 15 March 2018, the northern part of the district was split off to create a new Ga South Municipal District, with Ngleshie Amanfro as its capital town; thus the remaining part has been renamed as Weija Gbawe Municipal District, with Weija as its capital town. The municipality is located in the western part of Greater Accra Region and has Weija as its capital town.

== Population ==
According to 2021 population census, the municipal has a population of 213,674.

== Administration ==
The local authority of the district, the Weija Gbawe Municipal Assembly, is currently headed by Joseph Nyarni, who was appointed by the President of the Republic of Ghana in 2017 as the Municipal Chief Executive and serves as the political head of the district.

Administratively, the district is one of the 21 local authority districts of the Greater Accra Metropolitan Area, which include Accra Metropolitan Assembly, Ga Central Municipal Assembly, Ga West Municipal Assembly, Ga East Municipal Assembly, Ga North Municipal Assembly, Ga South Municipal Assembly, La Dade Kotopon Municipal District, Ledzokuku Municipal District, Krowor Municipal District, Okaikwei Municipal District, Ablekuma North Municipal District, Ablekuma West Municipal District, Ayawaso East Municipal District, Ayawaso North Municipal District, Ayawaso West Municipal District, Adentan Municipal District, Tema Metropolitan District, Tema West Municipal District, Ashaiman Municipal District, La Nkwantanang Madina Municipal District, and Kpone Katamanso Municipal District.
