= North Industrial Area, Accra =

Coordinates: 5°35′N 0°13′W

North Industrial Area
- Urban area
- Location within Ghana
- Country: Ghana
- Region: Greater Accra Region
- District: Accra Metropolitan
- Time zone: GMT
  - Summer (DST): GMT

== History ==
North Industrial Area is an area in Accra covering 3,245 square kilometers area of land which represents 1.4% of Ghana's total landmass. Despite its small land coverage, it is the most densely populated region with a population of 5,455,692 inhabitants as of 2021, representing significantly to the Ghana's 17.7% total population. Economically vibrant, the Greater Accra Region hosts key commercial centers such as Accra Mall, Melcom Shopping Centers, Marina Mall, and West Hills Mall. These centers contribute significantly to the region's economic prosperity.

North Industrial Area is a suburb of Accra noted for its industrial and commercial activities. About three decades ago, the North Industrial Area has been a hub for jobs to majority of young people, skilled and non-skilled.

== Banks ==
- Zenith Bank
- UniBank
- Access Bank
- GT Bank
- Universal Merchant Bank
- UT Bank
- Société Générale

== See also ==
- Kaneshie
