= Tse-Addo =

Community in Greater Accra Region, Ghana

Tse-Addo East La
- Town
- Country: Ghana
- Region: Greater Accra Region
- District: La Dade Kotopon Municipal District

Population
  - Total: —
- Time zone: GMT
  - Summer (DST): GMT

Tse-Addo (also known as East La) is a suburb of Labadi and a residential area in the Greater Accra Region of Ghana. It is located behind the Ghana International Trade Fair, La.

== Institution ==
- Tse Addo Police Post
