= Ayawaso Central Municipal Assembly =

Municipal district in Greater Accra region, Ghana

Ayawaso Central Municipal District
- Municipal District
- Districts of Greater Accra Region

- Location of Ayawaso Central Municipal District within Greater Accra
- Coordinates: 5°35′N 0°12′W
- Country: Ghana
- Region: Greater Accra
- Capital: Kokomlemle

Population (2021)
  - Total: 94,831
- Time zone: UTC+0 (GMT)
- ISO 3166 code: GH-EP-__

Ayawaso Central Municipal District is one of the twenty-nine districts in Greater Accra Region, Ghana. Originally it was formerly part of the then-larger Accra Metropolitan District in 1988, until a small portion of the district was split off to create Ayawaso Central Municipal District on 9 February 2019; thus the remaining part has been retained as Accra Metropolitan District. The municipality is located in the central part of Greater Accra Region and has Kokomlemle as its capital town.

== History ==
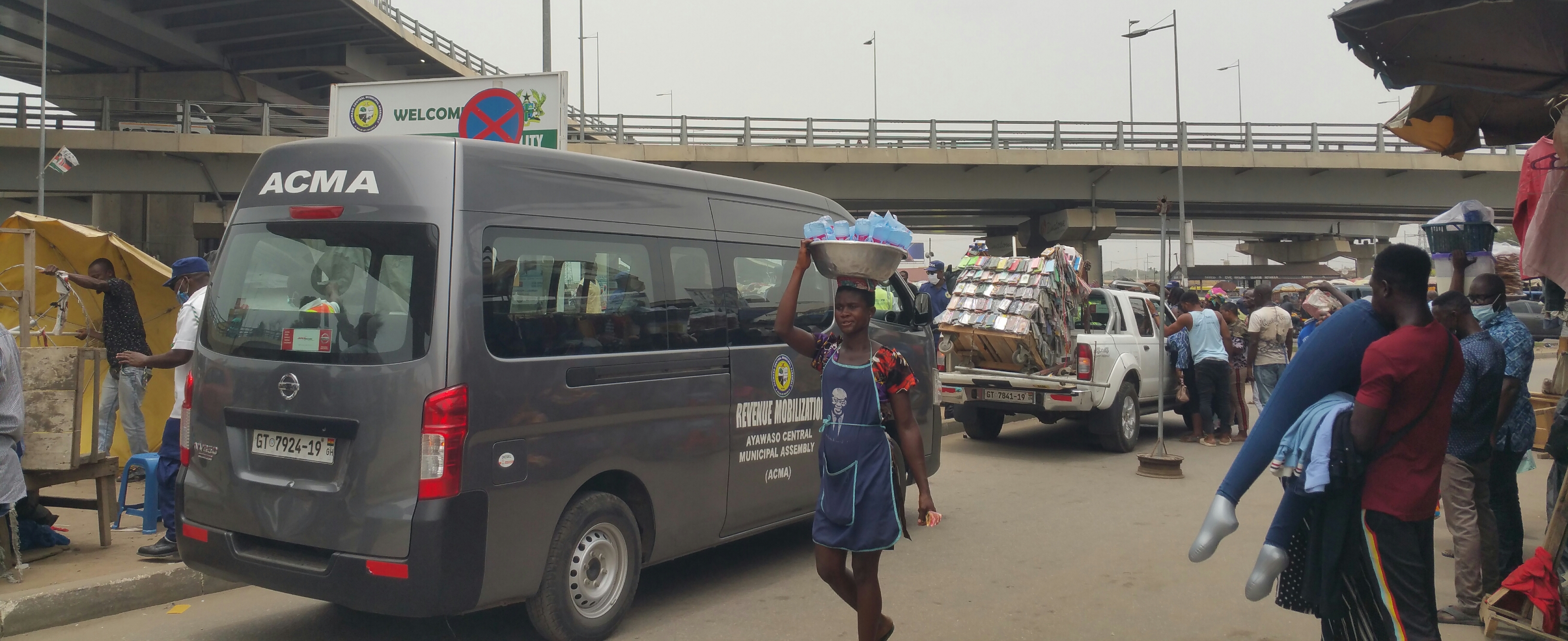
The Ayawaso Central Municipal Assembly raid on hawkers on pavements at Circle (2021).

The history of Ayawaso Central dates back to the days of the former president of Ghana Kwame Nkrumah, when Kwei Mensah who was known to be the first person to settle on the land joined several others in the country for the fight for multi-party democracy.

The Greater Accra Regional Minister, at the time, Ishmael Nii Ashitey, read a speech on behalf of the President of Ghana said, the new assemblies, which were created was in accordance with the 1992 Constitution and Local Governance Act, 2016 (Act 963) of the Constitution of Ghana.

The first Municipal Chief Executive (MCE) is Alhaji Ababio Mohammed Quaye. The Ayawaso Central constituency falls within the jurisdiction of the Municipal and the current Member of Parliament is Henry Quartey.

== Boundaries ==
Ayawaso Central Municipal District is bounded to the north by Ayawaso West Municipal District, to the West by Okaikoi South Municipal District, to the south by Korley Klottey Municipal District, and to the east by Ayawaso East Municipal District.

The 2010 population and housing census estimated the population of the district at 142,322 with 68,390 houses and 73,932 households. Using the Greater Accra Growth Rate of 3.1%, it is estimated that the 2018 population stands at 174,102.

Some of the communities within the municipal district include:

- Kotobabi
- New Town
- Alajo
- Kokomlemle

The district includes five (5) electoral areas:

- Maamobi West
- Kwoatsuru
- Maamobi East
- Nima West
- Kanda
