= Ali Baba Abature =

Ghanaian judge

Ali Baba Abature is a Ghanaian judge. In 2025, he was sworn in as a Justice of the Court of Appeal by John Dramani Mahama along with 19 others.

== Biography ==
In 2007, Abature was the Public Relations Officer of the Accra Metropolitan Assembly (AMA). He was also the head of Public Affairs Department of the AMA. He was also a special aide to the AMA Chief executive.

In 2014, he presided over cases at the Aflao Circuit Court.

In 2019, he was transferred from the Aflao Circuit Court to Adum-Kumasi Circuit Court ‘4’ due to unsafe environment. Nana Akuffo-Addo sworn him in as a High Court Judge along with thirty two others.

In 2024, he was a Circuit Court Judge. He was a judge at the Accra Circuit Court.

In 2025, he presided, dismissed a request and fined a cost against WAEC. He was also a presiding judge over a case involving ABSA Bank at the Accra High Court. He also dismissed the NPP's application for injunction against the Electoral Commission.

== Controversies ==
In 2022, Abature was dragged along with an Alfred Anum Quarshie, a legal practitioner by Stephen Okyere Nyame, a retired educationist to the General Legal Council over allegedly extorting of money from him for no job done.

In 2023, Abature was involved in a case where it was alleged Stanley Nii Adjiri Blankson, a former Mayor of Accra influenced him to tilt a ruling in favour of a party involved in a Chieftaincy dispute.
