= Dzorwulu =

- Town
- Location within Ghana
- Coordinates: 5°36′53″N 0°12′03″W
- Country: Ghana
- Region: Greater Accra Region
- District: Accra Metropolitan
- Elevation: 167 ft (51 m)
- Time zone: GMT
  - Summer (DST): GMT

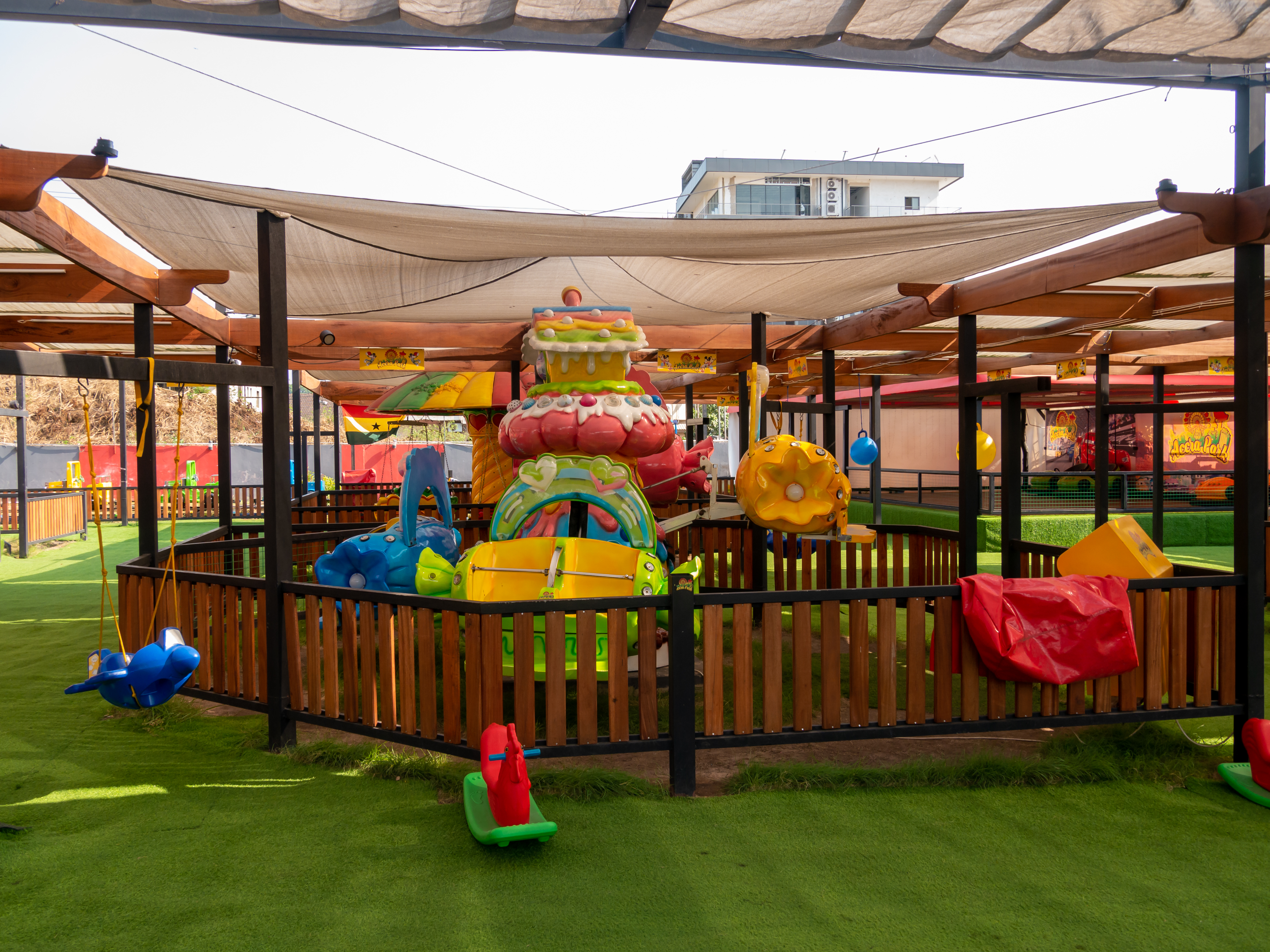
Children’s carousel at Accra Park in Dzorwulu

Dzorwulu is a town in the Greater Accra Region of Ghana. It is the capital of the Ayawaso West Municipal District. Dzorwulu and neighbouring North Dzorwulu are separated by the N1 highway.
