= Kotobabi =

Coordinates: 5°35′N 0°12′W

- Town
- Location within Ghana
- Country: Ghana
- Region: Greater Accra Region
- District: Accra Metropolitan
- Time zone: GMT
  - Summer (DST): GMT

Kotobabi is a town in the Accra Metropolitan district, a district of the Greater Accra Region of Ghana. It has a police station which serves suburbs in Accra like Roman Ridge, Pig Farm, Alajo, Maamobi, Kokomlemle, Alajo, Kpehe, Dzorwulu, Roman Ridge, Abelemkpe and Accra Newtown.
