= Mataheko Drainage Channel =

Drainage channel in Greater Accra, Ghana

Mataheko Drainage Channel Mataheko Drain

Location
- Country: Ghana
- Region: Greater Accra Region
- City: Accra

Physical characteristics
- Source: Western Accra
  - location: Mataheko, Accra
- Mouth: Odaw River
  - location: Greater Accra Region, Ghana

Basin features
- Progression: Mataheko Drainage Channel → Odaw River → Korle Lagoon → Gulf of Guinea
- River system: Odaw River Basin
- Landmarks: Korle Lagoon
- Purpose: Stormwater conveyance and flood control

The Mataheko Drainage Channel is a major urban stormwater drainage channel located in the Mataheko area of western Accra, Ghana. It forms part of the wider drainage infrastructure within the Odaw River Basin, one of the principal drainage systems in the Greater Accra Metropolitan Area. The channel plays an important role in conveying stormwater runoff from densely populated communities in western Accra and contributes to flood mitigation efforts within the metropolis

== Hydrological Significance and Location ==
The Mataheko Drainage Channel is situated within the catchment of the Odaw River Basin, covering approximately 270–272 km² in the Greater Accra Region. The Odaw River and its tributaries constitute the primary drainage network for Accra and discharge into the Korle Lagoon before reaching the Gulf of Guinea. The Mataheko channel is among several engineered tributary drains that feed into the larger Odaw drainage system.

The channel serves communities around Mataheko, South Kaneshie and adjoining urban settlements, conveying runoffs generated during periods of heavy rainfall. Because of rapid urbanisation, increased impervious surfaces and settlement expansion within the basin, the drainage channel has become an important component of Accra's flood-control infrastructure.

== Development and Infastructure ==
Improvement works on the Mataheko Drainage Channel formed part of the broader Accra Storm Drainage Improvement Works – Phase I, undertaken under the supervision of the Accra Metropolitan Assembly. Engineering consultancy firm Watertech Company Limited reported involvement in the detailed design, environmental impact assessment and construction supervision of the Mataheko drain as part of drainage enhancement projects implemented in Accra during the late 2000s.
