= Kokomlemle =

Coordinates: 5°35′N 0°12′W

- Town
- Location within Ghana
- Country: Ghana
- Region: Greater Accra Region
- District: Accra Metropolitan
- Time zone: GMT
  - Summer (DST): GMT

Kokomlemle is a town in the Accra Metropolitan District, a district of the Greater Accra Region of Ghana and noted for the location of Joy FM and Accra Technical Training Center (ATTC), among other institutions.

Kokomlemle is recognized as the capital town of the Ayawaso Central Municipal District. It is surrounded by other towns such as, Newtown, Nima and Asylum Down.
