= Accra Metropolitan District =

Accra Metropolitan District City of Accra
- City and metropolitan district
- Districts of Greater Accra Region

- Location of Accra Metropolitan District within Greater Accra
- Coordinates: 5°33′N 0°12′W
- Country: Ghana
- Region: Greater Accra
- Capital: Accra
- Founded: 1898 (Local Government Act, 1993 (Act 462)) (Legislative Instrument 1615)
- City Status: 1961

Government
  - Metropolitan Chief Executive: Elizabeth Kwatsoe Tawiah Sackey

Area
  - Total: 60 km^{2} (23 sq mi)
- Elevation: 61 m (200 ft)

Population (2021)
  - Total: 284,124
- Time zone: UTC+0 (GMT)
- Website: Official Website

The Accra Metropolitan District is one of the 254 Metropolitan, Municipal and Districts in Ghana, and among the 29 such districts in the Greater Accra Region with a population of 284,124 as of 2021. As of March 2018, it spans an area of approximately 60 km^{2} (23 mi^{2}) and encompasses the Ablekuma South, Ashiedu Keteke, and Okaikoi South sub-metropolitan district councils.

The district was established by the Local Government Act of 1993 (Act 462) and Legislative Instrument 1615. The local authority of the district, the Accra Metropolitan Assembly, is currently headed by Nii Kpapko Allotey, who was appointed by the President of the Republic of Ghana in 2025 as the Metropolitan Chief Executive and serves as the political head of the district and mayor of the City of Accra.

Since 1961, the district has been coterminous with the City of Accra, which also serves as its capital. Today, the Accra Metropolitan District is one of the 10 districts that make up the Accra Metropolitan Area, an area that serves as the capital of Ghana.

Administratively, the district is one of the 21 local authority districts of the Greater Accra Metropolitan Area, which include Ga South Municipal District, Ga Central Municipal District, Ga West Municipal District, Ga East Municipal District, Ga North Municipal District, Weija Gbawe Municipal District, La Dade Kotopon Municipal District, Ledzokuku Municipal District, Krowor Municipal District, Okaikwei North Municipal District, Ablekuma North Municipal District, Ablekuma West Municipal District, Ayawaso East Municipal District, Ayawaso North Municipal District, Ayawaso West Municipal District, Adentan Municipal District, Tema Metropolitan District, Tema West Municipal District, Ashaiman Municipal District, La Nkwantanang Madina Municipal District, and Kpone Katamanso Municipal District.

== Administrative Chronology ==
Since 1988, it was originally created as a metropolitan district assembly. However over the years, many former sub-metropolitan district councils had elevated into independent municipal district assemblies:

- 29 February 2008: the far eastern part of the district was split off to create Ledzokuku-Krowor Municipal District (capital: Teshie-Nungua); which was split off into two new municipal districts on 15 March 2018: Ledzokuku Municipal District (capital: Teshie-Nungua) and Krowor Municipal District (capital: Nungua)
- 28 June 2012: the eastern part of the district was split off to create La Dade Kotopon Municipal District (capital)
- 15 March 2018: six parts of the district was split off to create the following: Ablekuma North Municipal District, Ablekuma West Municipal District, Ayawaso East Municipal District, Ayawaso North Municipal District, Ayawaso West Municipal District and Okaikwei North Municipal District
- 19 February 2019: three parts of the district was split off to create the following: Ablekuma Central Municipal District, Ayawaso Central Municipal District and Korle-Klottey Municipal District

== History ==
Since its establishment, the Accra Metropolitan District has gone through numerous changes with respect to jurisdictional boundaries and number of sub-metropolitan district councils.

Under the local government arrangements when the Accra city council was created in 1953, six area councils were established namely Ablekuma, Ashiedu Keteke, Ayawaso, Okaikoi, Osu Klotey and Kpeshie (which comprised Teshie, Nungua and La). This system operated until 18 March 1989 when Accra was elevated to metropolitan district status and the area councils became sub-metropolitan district councils under Legislative Instrument 1500 of the new Local Government System (PNDCL 207) Act 462.

In 2003, part of the first schedule of the Accra Metropolitan Legislative Instrument of 1995 (LI 161) was amended and replaced with Legislative Instrument 1722 of 2003 which led to the creation of 7 more sub-metropolitan districts out of the existing six. The Kpeshie sub-metropolitan district was split into the Nungua, Teshie and La sub-metropolitan districts; the Ablekuma sub-metropolitan district was split into the Ablekuma North, Ablekuma Central, and Ablekuma South sub-metropolitan districts; the Ayawaso sub-metropolitan district was split into the Ayawaso Central, Ayawaso East, and Ayawaso West sub-metropolitan districts; and the Okaikoi sub-metropolitan district was split into the Okaikoi North and Okaikoi South sub-metropolitan districts. This intervention was informed by the need to break up the metropolitan district into smaller sectors to facilitate good governance.

In 2007, to promote efficiency in the administrative machinery and also meet the ever pressing demands for amenities and essential services, the Teshie and Nungua sub-metropolitan districts were merged and upgraded to municipal Status in 2007 as the Ledzokuku-Krowor Municipal District under Legislative Instrument 1865. Later, in 2012, the La sub-metropolitan district was carved out of the Accra Metropolitan District to form the La Dade-Kotopon Municipal District under Legislative Instrument 2038,

In November 2017, the government laid before Parliament Legislative Instruments (LI) which elevated the Ablekuma North sub-metropolitan district to municipal status as the Ablekuma North Municipal Assembly and carved out the western part of the Ablekuma South sub-metropolitan district to form the Ablekuma West Municipal Assembly. Additionally, the Ayawaso West, Ayawaso East, and part of the Ayawaso Central sub-metropolitan districts were carved out of the Accra Metropolitan Assembly to form the Ayawaso North, Ayawaso East and Ayawaso West Municipal Assemblies. The Okaikoi North sub-metropolitan district was also elevated to municipal status as the Okaikoi North Municipal Assembly.

== Administrative Area ==
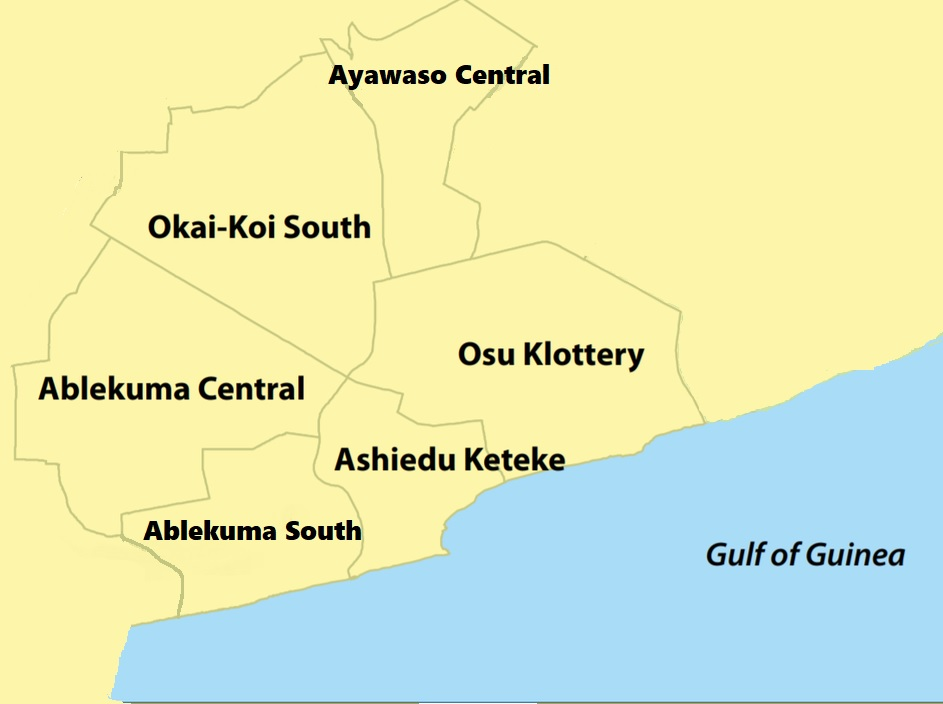
AMA borders with sub-metro areas as of 2018

The Accra Metropolitan district covers a total land area of 60 km^{2} (23 mi^{2}). It is bounded to the north by the Ayawaso West Municipal district and Okaikoi North Municipal district, to the west by the Ablekuma West Municipal district and Ablekuma North Municipal district, and to the east by the Ayawaso East Municipal district and the La Dade Kotopon Municipal district. The Gulf of Guinea serves as the southern border.

=== Sub-Metropolitan Districts ===
==== Ablekuma South Sub-Metropolitan District ====
The Ablekuma South sub-metropolitan district covers a total land area of approximately 2.58 km^{2} (1.00 mi^{2}). It shares boundaries with the Ablekuma West Municipal District to the west, Ablekuma Central sub-metropolitan district to the north, and Ashiedu Keteke sub-metropolitan district to the east.

Some of the communities within the sub-metropolitan district include:

- Korle Gonno
- Korle-Bu
- Chorkor
- Mamprobi
- New Mamprobi

==== Ashiedu Keteke Sub-Metropolitan District ====
The Ashiedu Keteke sub-metropolitan district covers a total land area of approximately 2.89 km^{2} (1.12 mi^{2}). It is bounded to the north by Ablekuma Central sub-metropolitan district, to the west by Ablekuma South sub-metropolitan district, to the east by Osu Klottey sub-metropolitan district, and to the south by the Gulf of Guinea. The sub-metropolitan district houses the Central Business District (CBD) and as such the hub of major commercial activities within the City of Accra.

The 2010 population and housing census estimated the population of the sub-metropolitan district at 117,525 with 13,732 houses and 34,964 households. Using the Greater Accra Growth Rate of 3.1%, it is estimated that the 2018 population stands at 143,768.

Some of the communities within the sub-metropolitan district include:

- Jamestown
- Usshertown
- Tudu
- Okaishie
- Central Business District

==== Okaikoi South Sub-Metropolitan District ====
The Okaikoi South sub-metropolitan district shares boundaries with Okaikoi North Municipal District to the North, Osu Klottey sub-metropolitan district to the South, Ablekuma Central sub-metropolitan district to the West, and Ayawaso Central sub-metropolitan district to the East.

The 2010 population and housing census estimated the population of the sub-metropolitan district at 121,718 with 13,378 houses and 34,800 households. Using the Greater Accra Growth Rate of 3.1%, it is estimated that the 2018 population stands at 148,897.

Some of the communities within the sub-metropolitan district include:

- Bubuashie
- Kaneshie
- North Kaneshie
- Awudome
- Avenor

=== Electoral Areas ===
The Accra Metropolitan Assembly is made up of 20 electoral areas covering three constituencies.

==== Ablekuma South Constituency ====
The Ablekuma South constituency falls within the Ablekuma South sub-metropolitan district and includes five (5) electoral areas:

- Korle Gonno
- Korlebu
- Chorkor
- Mamprobi
- New Mamprobi

==== Odododiodioo Constituency ====
The Odododiodioo constituency falls within the Ashiedu Keteke sub-metropolitan district and includes seven (7) electoral areas:

- Ngleshie
- Mudor
- Kinka
- Nmlitsagonno
- Amamomo
- Korle Wonkon
- Korle Dudor

==== Okaikoi South Constituency ====
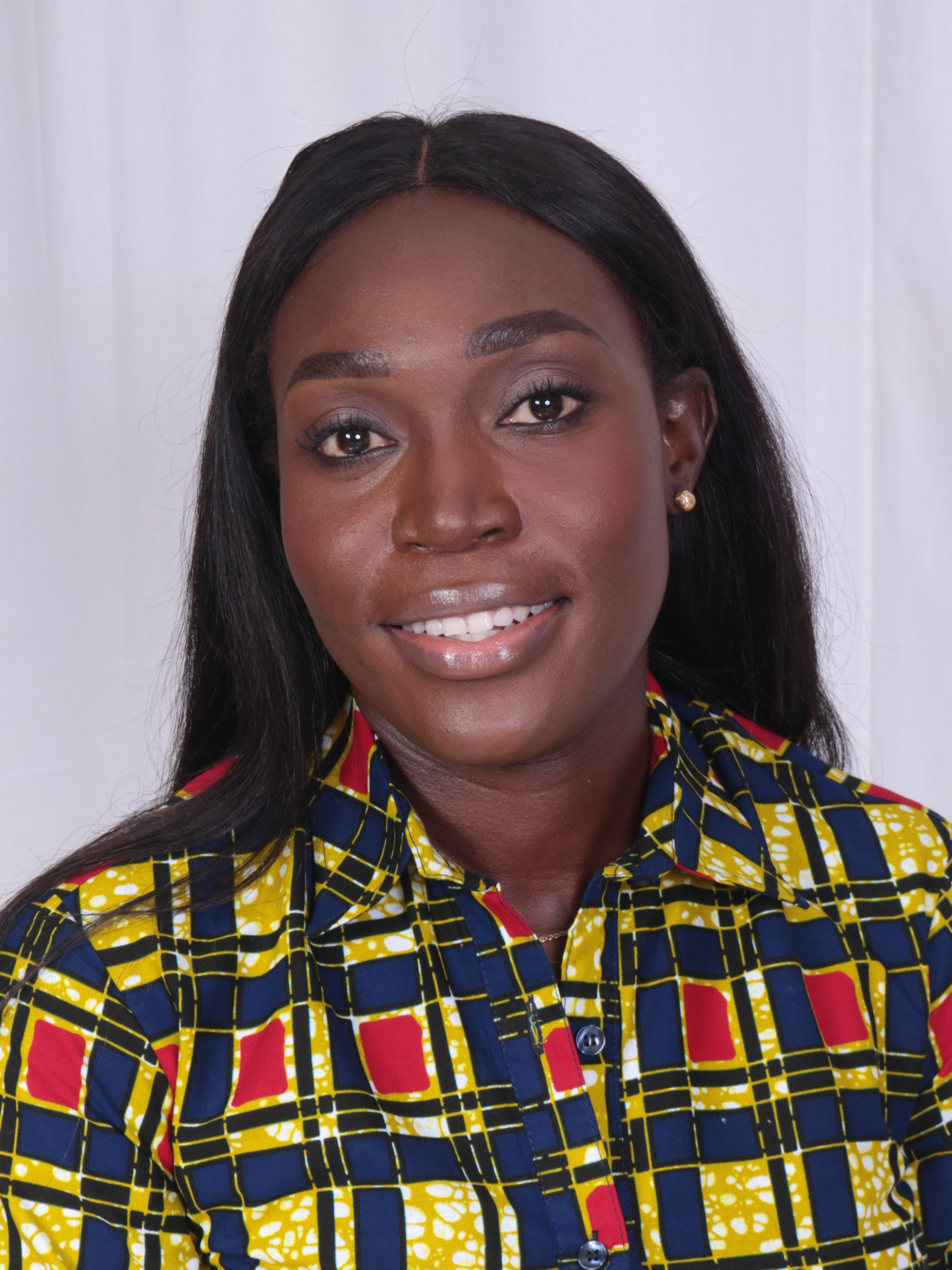
Member of Parliament, Okaikoi South Constituency

The Okaikoi South constituency falls within the Okaikoi South sub-metropolitan district and includes eight (8) electoral areas: The current member of parliament for the Okaikoi South constituency is Hon. Dakoa Newman of the New Patriotic Party.

- Awudome
- Goten
- Kaatsean
- Mukose
- Bubuashie
- Bubui
- Avenor
- Kaneshie

== Demographics ==
At the 2010 census, there were 1,665,086 people residing in the district. Out of the total population, about 47% were migrants (born elsewhere in the Greater Accra Region or other regions in Ghana or outside Ghana), with people born in the Eastern Region but resident in the district constituting 27.8% of the migrant population.

The total number of households in the district stood at 501,903 households, out of which 450,794 households lived in the 149,789 houses within the district The average household size in the district is 3.7 persons per household and the population per house is estimated at 11.1, indicating that compound houses are the most common type of dwelling (67.7%) within the district.

38.4% of the population were under the age of 19, 12.4% between 20 and 24, 11.5% between 25 and 29, 21.5% between 30 and 44, 12.2% between 45 and 64, and 4% age 65 and over. For every 100 females, there were about 93 males.

== Governance ==
The Accra Metropolitan district is administered by the Accra Metropolitan Assembly, which is the political and administrative authority for the City of Accra. Structurally, the Accra Metropolitan Assembly is made up of the General Assembly at the apex and six (6) sub-metropolitan district councils representing each of the six sub-metropolitan districts, which are subordinate bodies of the Assembly performing functions assigned or delegated to them by the Assembly.

The General Assembly, whose meetings are presided over by the Presiding Member, is composed of 21 elected members, 14 government appointees, 3 Members of Parliament, and the Metropolitan Chief Executive (mayor), who also chairs the Executive Committee. The General Assembly meetings are presided over by the Presiding Member.

Assembly Members

Name	Gender	Region Name	District Name	Constituency Name	Electoral Name
THEOPHILUS ISAAC	MALE	G. ACCRA	Accra Metropolitan	ABLEKUMA SOUTH	CHORKOR
RICHARD TAGOE	MALE	G. ACCRA	Accra Metropolitan	ABLEKUMA SOUTH	KORLE BU
ROBERT NII ASHIE KOTEY	MALE	G. ACCRA	Accra Metropolitan	ABLEKUMA SOUTH	KORLE DUDOR
IVAN ESINAM TEKPLI	MALE	G. ACCRA	Accra Metropolitan	ABLEKUMA SOUTH	KORLE GONNO
JOSEPH KWABENA BROWN	MALE	G. ACCRA	Accra Metropolitan	ABLEKUMA SOUTH	MAMPROBI
NATHENIAL OSEI WELBECK	MALE	G. ACCRA	Accra Metropolitan	ABLEKUMA SOUTH	NEW MAMPROBI
MUSAH ZIYAD	MALE	G. ACCRA	Accra Metropolitan	ODODODIODIOO	AMAMOMO
CARLOS NII AYAA MANKATTAH	MALE	G. ACCRA	Accra Metropolitan	ODODODIODIOO	KINKA
PETER ARYEE QUAYE	MALE	G. ACCRA	Accra Metropolitan	ODODODIODIOO	KORLE WONKON
FRANCIS ASARE	MALE	G. ACCRA	Accra Metropolitan	ODODODIODIOO	MUDOR
FESTUS NII AYI HARFORD	MALE	G. ACCRA	Accra Metropolitan	ODODODIODIOO	NGLESHIE
BOYE ISSAH QUARTEY	MALE	G. ACCRA	Accra Metropolitan	ODODODIODIOO	NMLITSA GONNO
ALFRED ASIEDU ADJEI	MALE	G. ACCRA	Accra Metropolitan	OKAIKWEI SOUTH	AVENOR
MICHAEL ADU	MALE	G. ACCRA	Accra Metropolitan	OKAIKWEI SOUTH	AWUDOME
DANIEL OMABOE	MALE	G. ACCRA	Accra Metropolitan	OKAIKWEI SOUTH	BUBIASHIE
DAVID ABALO	MALE	G. ACCRA	Accra Metropolitan	OKAIKWEI SOUTH	BUBUI
OBED NYARKO	MALE	G. ACCRA	Accra Metropolitan	OKAIKWEI SOUTH	GONTEN
FREDERICK ASANTE KRODUA	MALE	G. ACCRA	Accra Metropolitan	OKAIKWEI SOUTH	KANESHIE
IBRAHIM TETTEH ANKRAH	MALE	G. ACCRA	Accra Metropolitan	OKAIKWEI SOUTH	KANTSEIAN
EBENEZER QUAYE	MALE	G. ACCRA	Accra Metropolitan	OKAIKWEI SOUTH	MUKOSE

=== Administrative Structure ===
The Accra Metropolitan Assembly (AMA) has sixteen (16) statutory departments, some of which are state entities decentralized and incorporated into the Local Assembly structure, and report directly to the Metropolitan Coordinating Director (MCD) and ultimately to the Metropolitan Chief Executive. Some of these departments oversee other functional units.

==== Central Administration ====
The Central Administration department is headed by the Metropolitan Coordinating Director (MCD) and is responsible for ensuring the implementation of governmental policies, projects and programmes at the MMDAs level. The department guides policy formulation, planning and decision-making at the Assembly.

This department includes the following units: Public Relations, Human Resources, Development Planning, Procurement and Logistics, Security, Transport, Management Information Systems, Information Service, Protocol.

==== Finance Department ====
The Finance department leads in the management and use of financial resources to achieve value for money. It directs and controls financial management in line with public sector accounting principles thereby safeguarding of the Assembly's assets.

==== Public Health Department ====
The Public Health department provides strategic and administrative leadership for the management of policies and programs related to environmental sanitation. The department also promotes and protects public health and safety through collaboration innovation and strategic standard enforcement.

==== Physical Planning Department ====
The physical planning department manages the activities of the Department of Town and Country Planning and the Departments of Parks and Gardens.

The department's responsibilities include to:

- Advise the District Assembly on national policies on physical planning, land use and development
- Coordinate activities and projects of departments and other agencies including non-governmental organizations to ensure compliance with planning standards
- Assist in preparations of physical plans as a guide for the formulation of development policies, decisions and to design projects within the Assembly
- Advise on setting out approved plans for future development of land at the district level
- Advise on the conditions for the construction of public and private buildings and structures and assist to provide the layout for buildings for improved housing layout and settlements
- Ensure the prohibition of the construction of new buildings unless building plans submitted have been approved by the Assembly
- Advise and facilitate the demolishing of dilapidated buildings and recovery of incurred cost in connection with the demolishing
- Advise the Assembly on the siting of billboards and masts, and ensure compliance with the decisions of the Assembly
- Advise on the acquisition of land property in the public interest, and undertake street naming, numbering of houses and related issues.

==== Works Department ====
The Department of Works is a merger of the Public works Department, Department of Feeder Roads, Water & Sanitation Units, Department of Rural Housing, and the Works Unit of the Assembly.

Among the responsibilities of this department are to:

- Facilitate the implementation of policies on works and report to the Assembly, and provide advice on matters relating to Works in the Assembly.
- Facilitate the construction, repair and maintenance of public roads including feeder roads, and drains along any streets in the major settlements
- Encourage and facilitate the maintenance of public buildings and facilities
- Assist to build, equip, close and maintain markets and prohibit the erection of stores in places other than the markets
- Assist to inspect projects undertaken by the District Assembly with the relevant departments of the Assembly
- Advise the Assembly on the prohibition of digging of burrow pits and other evacuations in the sinking of wells
- Assist to maintain public buildings made up of offices, residential accommodations and ancillary structures
- Advise and encourage owners of building structures to remove dilapidated structures in any public place; paint, distemper, white wash or color wash the outside of any building forming part of the premises; and tidy up the premises and remove any derelict vehicles or objects which constitute nuisance
- Provide technical advice for the machinery and structural layout of building plans to facilitate escape from fire, rescue operation and fire management

==== Urban Roads Department ====
The Urban Roads department collects data for planning and development of road infrastructure in the district, assists with the evaluation of road designs by consultants, and ensures that funds from road fund and other sources are used for the designated roads in line with approved standards.

==== Waste Management Department ====
The Waste Management department is responsible for the provision of facilities, infrastructure Services and programs for effective and efficient waste management for the improvement in environmental sanitation, the protection of the environment and the promotion of public health.

As part of ensuring proper hygiene, the department supervises the cleansing of drains, streets, markets, car parks and weeding of road sides and open spaces as well as inspection and maintenance of sanitary facilities.

==== Education, Youth and Sports Department ====
The Education, Youth and Sport department primarily assists in the formulation and implementation of policies on education in the Assembly within the framework of national policies and guidelines. It also has an advisory role in the Assembly on matters related to pre-school, primary schools, and junior high schools in the district.

==== Budget and Rating Department ====
The Budget and Rating department provides technical leadership in the preparation and management of the budget in the Service. The department advises the Assembly on cost implications and financial decisions in the LGS, and coordinates the preparation of budgets, participates in the preparation of procurement plan and assists in fee-fixing resolutions.

==== Social Welfare and Community Development Department ====
The Social Welfare and Community Development department coordinates and promotes social development programs and policies to improve the welfare of people and communities. The department also plans, initiates and coordinates community-based projects, day care centers and services for the rehabilitation of the physically challenged.

==== Disaster Management and Prevention Department ====
The Disaster Management and Prevention department assists the planning and implementation of programs to prevent and/or mitigate disaster in the district. As part of its preventive role, the department assists and facilitates education and training of volunteers to fight fires and organizes public disaster education campaigns.

==== Food and Agriculture Department ====
The Food and Agriculture department provides leadership for the development of agriculture and sustainability of the agro-environment. The department promotes policies, strategies and appropriate agricultural technologies necessary to improve agribusiness, agro-processing and crop/animal/ fish production.

==== Legal Department ====
The Legal department facilitates the drawing up of rules and regulations to guide the activities of the Assembly as well as the interpretation of rules, laws and regulations to enhance the conduct of the Assembly's business.

== Climate ==
Accra

Climate chart (precipitation, max. and min. temperature)
J	F	M	A	M	J	J	A	S	O	N	D
15 31 23	33 31 24	56 31 24	81 31 24	142 31 24	178 29 23	46 27 23	15 27 22	36 27 23	64 29 23	36 31 24	23 31 24
- █ Average max. and min. temperatures in °C
- █ Precipitation totals in mm
- Source: BBC Weather
Imperial conversion
J	F	M	A	M	J	J	A	S	O	N	D
0.6 87 73	1.3 88 75	2.2 88 76	3.2 88 76	5.6 87 75	7 84 74	1.8 81 74	0.6 80 71	1.4 81 73	2.5 85 74	1.4 87 75	0.9 88 75
- █ Average max. and min. temperatures in °F
- █ Precipitation totals in inches

The Accra Metropolitan district features a tropical savanna climate (Köppen climate classification Aw) that borders on a hot semi-arid climate (BSh). The average annual rainfall is about 730 mm, which falls primarily during Ghana's two rainy seasons. The chief rainy season begins in April and ends in mid-July, whilst a weaker second rainy season occurs in October. Rain usually falls in short intensive storms and causes local flooding in which drainage channels are obstructed.

Very little variation in temperature occurs throughout the year. The mean monthly temperature ranges from 25.9 °C (78.6 °F) in August (the coolest) to 29.6 °C (85.3 °F) in March (the hottest), with an annual average of 27.6 °C (81.7 °F). The "cooler" months tend to be more humid than the warmer months. As a result, during the warmer months and particularly during the windy harmattan season, the city experiences a breezy "dry heat" that feels less warm than the "cooler" but more humid rainy season.

As a coastal city, Accra is vulnerable to the impacts of climate change and sea level rise, with population growth putting increasing pressure on the coastal areas. Drainage infrastructure is particularly at risk, which has profound implications for people's livelihoods, especially in informal settlements. Inadequate planning regulation and law enforcement, as well as perceived corruption in government processes, lack of communication across government departments and lack of concern or government co-ordination with respect to building codes are major impediments to progressing the development of Accra's drainage infrastructure, according to the Climate & Development Knowledge Network.

As Accra is close to the equator, the daylight hours are practically uniform during the year. Relative humidity is generally high, varying from 65% in the midafternoon to 95% at night. The predominant wind direction in Accra is from the WSW to NNE sectors. Wind speeds normally range between 8 and 16 km/h. High wind gusts occur with thunderstorms, which generally pass in squalls along the coast.

The maximum wind speed record in Accra is 107.4 km/h (58 knots). Strong winds associated with thunderstorm activity often cause damage to property by removing roofing material. Several areas of Accra experience microclimatic effects. Low-profile drainage basins with a north-south orientation are not as well ventilated as those oriented east-west.

Air is often trapped in pockets over the city, and an insulation effect can give rise to a local increase in air temperature of several degrees. This occurs most notably in the Accra Newtown sports complex areas.
