= Ablekuma Central Municipal Assembly =

- Municipal District
- Districts of Greater Accra Region

- Location of Ablekuma Central Municipal Assembly within Greater Accra
- Coordinates: 5°33′11.88″N 0°14′24.36″W
- Country: Ghana
- Region: Greater Accra
- Capital: Lartebiokorshie

Area
  - Total: 9 km^{2} (3.5 sq mi)

Population (2021)
  - Total: 169,145
  - Density: 19,000/km^{2} (49,000/sq mi)
- Time zone: UTC+0 (GMT)
- ISO 3166 code: GH-EP-__

Ablekuma Central Municipal Assembly is one of the twenty-nine districts in Greater Accra Region, Ghana. Originally it was formerly part of the then-larger Accra Metropolitan District in 1988, until a small portion of the district was split off to create Ablekuma Central Municipal District on 19 February 2019; thus the remaining part has been retained as Accra Metropolitan District. The municipality is located in the central part of Greater Accra Region and has Lartebiokorshie as its capital town.

== Governance ==
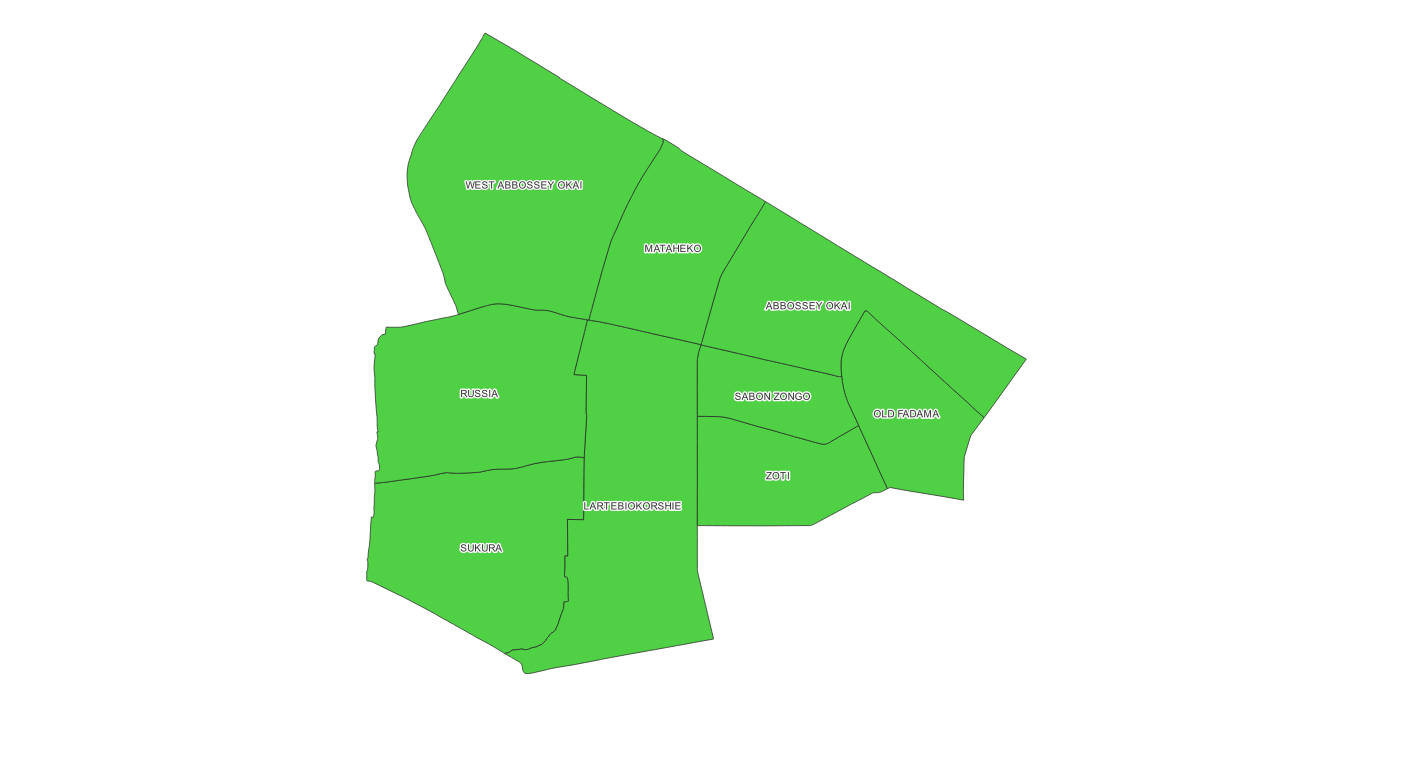
Localities in Ablekuma Central

The Ablekuma Central Municipal Assembly was established on 19 February 2019 by an LI 2376. The Assembly was carved out from Accra Metropolitan Assembly. The Assembly therefore started implementation of projects within its area of jurisdiction from March 2019. The Ablekuma Central Municipal is located at the northern part of the Greater Accra Region. Its western neighbour is Ablekuma West Municipal, Accra Metropolitan Assembly on the southeast and on the north by Ablekuma North Municipal. Whilst the northeast is bounded by Okaikoi South sub-metropolitan district. Some of the towns and areas in the district seen in the image below

== See also ==
- Ablekuma
