= Accra New Town =

Coordinates: 5°35′N 0°13′W

Accra Newtown
- Town
- Newtown
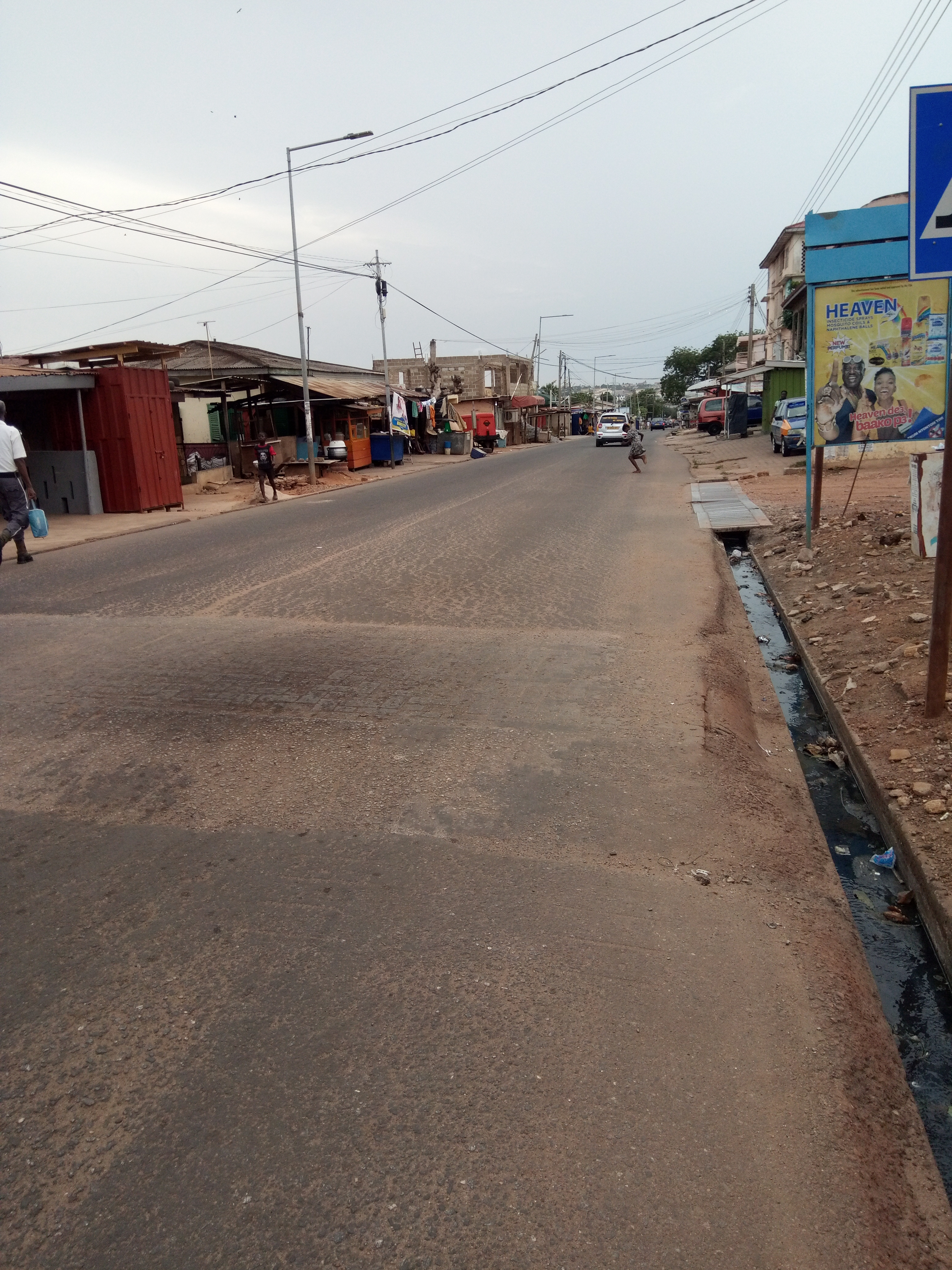
- A street image of Accra Newtown during the COVID-19 pandemic in Ghana
- Nickname: ANT
- Location within Ghana
- Country: Ghana
- Region: Greater Accra Region
- District: Accra Metropolitan
- Time zone: GMT
  - Summer (DST): GMT

Accra New Town is a town in the Ayawaso North district, a district of the Greater Accra Region of Ghana.

== Education ==
- Accra Newtown Experimental 1 JHS
