= Dickson Adomako Kissi =

Ghanaian politician and medical practitioner

Hon. Dickson Adomako Kissi MP
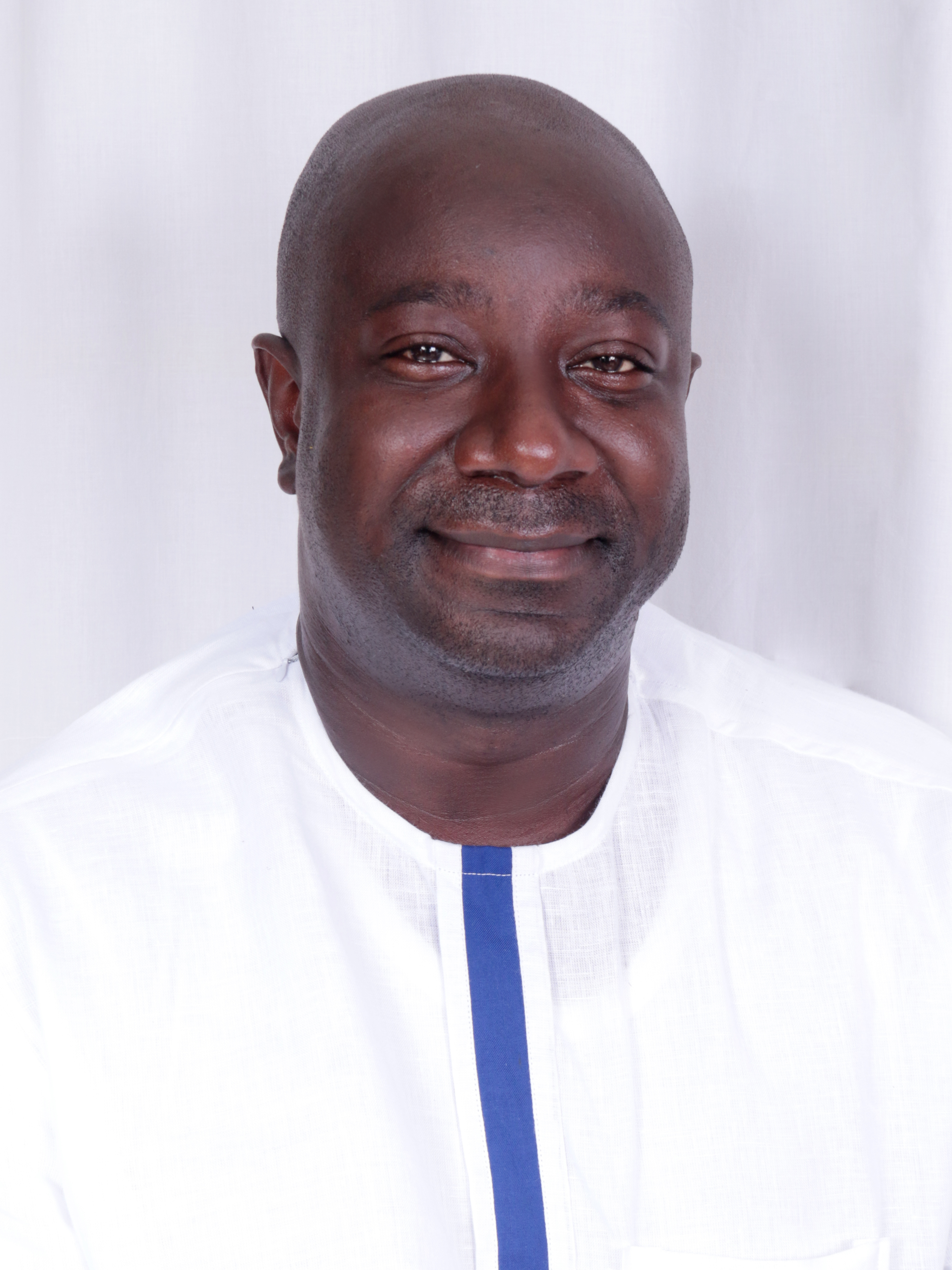

Member of the Ghana Parliament for Anyaa Sowutuom Constituency

Personal details
- Born: 23 August 1981 (age 45)
- Party: New Patriotic Party

Dickson Adomako Kissi (born 23 August 1981) is a Ghanaian politician and medical practitioner. He is a member of the Eighth Parliament of the Fourth Republic of Ghana representing the Anyaa Sowutuom Constituency in the Greater Accra Region on the ticket of the New Patriotic Party(NPP).

== Early life ==
Adomako Kissi was born on 23 August 1981 to Dr. Emanuel Abu Kissi, a medical doctor and Madam Elizabeth Bamfo Kissi, a Midwife nurse. He hails from Kwahu Mpreaso in the Eastern Region of Ghana. He had his secondary educations at St. Peter's Boys secondary school in Kwahu Nkwatia. He is a graduate of Brigham Young University, USA and the Ghana medical school where he obtain a Bachelor of Science Degree (Economics and Chemistry Minor) in 2004 and a Medical Degree (General Practitioner) in 2013 respectively.

== Politics ==
He is a member of the New Patriotic Party(NPP). In June 2015, he contested to represent the NPP at the 2016 Ghanaian general election but lost to the incumbent MP Shirley Ayorkor Botchway. He founder the Professionals for Political Action (PPA), a pro NPP group made up of professionals in all sectors to canvas votes for the party's presidential candidate, Nana Addo-Dankwa-Akufo-Addo, and Parliamentary Candidates. Adomako contested and won the June, 2020 parliamentary primaries to represent the NPP at the 2022 Ghanaian general elections. He won the Anyaa Sowutuom Constituency seat on the ticket of the NPP. He serves as the Vice Chairperson and a member of Environment, Science and Technology Committee and Public Accounts Committee respectively in the Eighth Parliament of the Fourth Republic of Ghana.

In the parliamentary primaries of 2024 for the NPP, he was defeated in his attempt to represent the party by Elder Emmanuel Tobbin. Tobbin secured 818 votes, surpassing his opponent who received 566 votes out of the total valid votes cast.

== Career ==
Adomako was a teaching Assistant at Brigham Young University while a student of the school. Upon graduating he joined Covidien Medtronics of Connecticut as a Product Analyst. He is currently a medical practitioner and the Business Development Advisor of Deseret Hospital in Accra.
