= Districts of Ghana =

Second-level administrative subdivisions of Ghana

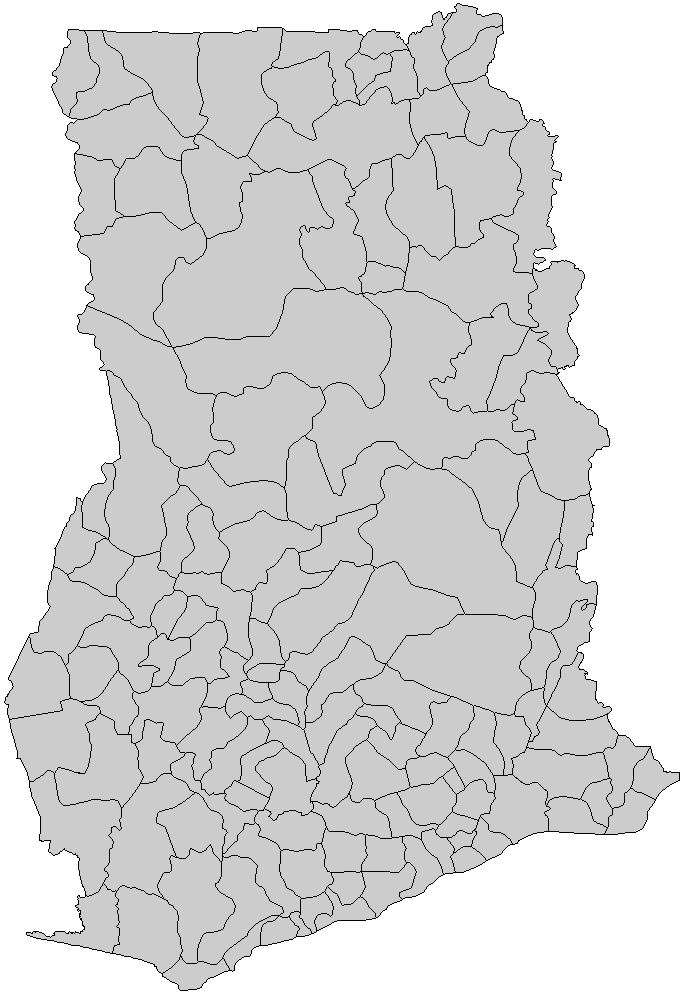
Districts of Ghana.

The Districts of Ghana are second-level administrative subdivisions of Ghana, below the level of region. There are currently 261 local metropolitan, municipal and district assemblies (or MMDA's).

== History ==
The districts of Ghana were re-organized in 1988/1989 in an attempt to decentralize the government and to assist in development. The reform of the late 1980s subdivided the regions of Ghana into 110 districts, where local district assemblies should deal with the local administration. By 2006, an additional 28 districts were created by splitting some of the original 110, bringing their number up to 138. In February 2008, there were more districts created and some were upgraded to municipal status. This brought the final number to 170 districts in Ghana. Since then, a further 46 districts have been added since 28 June 2012 bringing the total to 216 districts.

== Types of Districts ==
Districts are classified into three types: Ordinary Districts with a minimum population of seventy-five thousand (75,000) people, Municipal Districts with a minimum population of ninety-five thousand (95,000) people, and Metropolitan Districts with a minimum population of two hundred and fifty thousand (250,000) people.

== Governance and administration ==
=== District Assemblies ===
Districts are governed by District Assemblies, which are established by the Minister of Local Government, and serve as the highest political authority in each district. They consist of:

- the District Chief Executive, appointed by the President of the Republic
- one person from each electoral area within the district elected by universal adult suffrage
- the member or members of Parliament from the constituencies that fall within the area of authority of the District Assembly
- other members that shall not exceed thirty per cent of the total membership of the District Assembly appointed by the President in consultation with the traditional authorities and other interest groups in the district

==== District Chief Executive ====
The District Chief Executive is appointed by the President of the Republic and serves as the representative of the Central Government in the district. The incumbent presides at meetings of the Executive Committee of the District Assembly, and is responsible for:

- the day-to-day performance of the executive and administrative functions of the District Assembly
- the supervision of the departments of the District Assembly

==== Executive committee ====
The Executive Committee exercises the executive and coordinating functions of the District Assembly, and has the following members:

- the District Chief Executive, who serves as chairperson
- the chairpersons of the following Sub-Committees of the Executive Committee:
  - Development Planning,
  - Social Services
  - Works
  - Justice and Security
  - Finance and Administration
  - the chairperson of one ad hoc Sub-Committee of the Executive Committee elected by the District Assembly
  - any two other members elected by members of the District Assembly, at least one of whom is a woman

==== Presiding Member ====
Each District Assembly elects a Presiding Member from among their number, who convenes and presides at meetings of the District Assembly.

=== Functions of District Assemblies ===
As the political and administrative authorities over the districts, the primary function of District Assemblies is to promote local economic development.

The Local Government Act of 2016 also tasks District Assemblies to:

- formulate and execute plans, programs and strategies for the effective mobilization of the resources necessary for the overall development of the district
- promote and support productive activity and social development in the district and remove any obstacles to initiative and development
- sponsor the education of students from the district to fill particular manpower needs of the district especially in the social sectors of education and health, making sure that the sponsorship is fairly and equitably balanced between male and female students
- initiate programs for the development of basic infrastructure and provide municipal works and services in the district
- be responsible for the development, improvement and management of human settlements and the environment in the district
- in co-operation with the appropriate national and local security agencies, be responsible for the maintenance of security and public safety in the district
- ensure ready access to courts in the district for the promotion of justice
- act to preserve and promote the cultural heritage within the district
- initiate, sponsor or carry out studies that may be necessary for the discharge of any of their duties

The Act also grants the District Assemblies with the following authorities:

- Auction sales, as provided by the Auction Sales Act, 1989 (P.N.D.C.L. 230)
- Liquor licensing, as provided by the Liquor Licensing Act, 1970 (Act 331)
- Control bushfires, as provided by the Control and Prevention of Bushfires Act, 1990 (P.N.D.C.L. 229)*
- Execute the following provisions of the Criminal Offences Act, 1960 (Act 29) within its district: section 296 in respect of throwing rubbish in the street; and section 300 in respect of stray cattle

== List of Districts ==
=== Ahafo Region ===
Ahafo Region in Ghana

The Ahafo Region of Ghana was created by a referendum in December 2018. The regional capital is Goaso. It was part of the then Brong-Ahafo Region and contains 6 districts, 3 municipal and 3 ordinary districts. These are:

| District | Category | Capital | Established | Comments |
|---|---|---|---|---|
| Asunafo North | Municipal | Goaso (Note: Regional capitals in bold.) | 1912 | Regional capital |
| Asunafo South | District | Kukuom | 2012 | |
| Asutifi North | District | Kenyasi | | |
| Asutifi South | District | Hwidiem | 2012 | |
| Tano North | Municipal | Duayaw Nkwanta | 2004 | |
| Tano South | Municipal | Bechem | 2004 | |

=== Ashanti Region ===
Districts of the Ashanti Region

The Ashanti Region of Ghana is made up of 43 districts. This was increased from 30 districts. This is made up of 1 Metropolitan, 19 Municipal and 23 Ordinary districts. These are:

| District | Category | Capital | Established | Comments |
|---|---|---|---|---|
| Adansi Asokwa | District | Adansi Asokwa | 2018 | |
| Adansi North | District | Fomena | | |
| Adansi South | District | New Edubiase | | |
| Afigya-Kwabre North | District | Boamang | 2018 | |
| Afigya-Kwabre South | District | Kodie | 1 November 2007 | |
| Ahafo-Ano North | Municipal | Tepa | 1988 | |
| Ahafo-Ano South East | District | Adugyama | 2018 | |
| Ahafo-Ano South West | District | Mankranso | | |
| Akrofuom | District | Akrofuom | 15 March 2018 | |
| Amansie Central | District | Jacobu | 2004 | |
| Amansie West | District | Manso Nkwanta | 1988 | |
| Amansie South | District | Manso Adubia | 15 March 2018 | |
| Asante-Akim Central | Municipal | Konongo | 1988 | |
| Asante-Akim North | District | Agogo | | |
| Asante-Akim South | Municipal | Juaso | | |
| Asokore-Mampong | Municipal | Asokore Mampong | 29 June 2012 | |
| Asokwa | Municipal | Asokwa | 2018 | |
| Atwima-Kwanwoma | District | Twedie | November 2007 | |
| Atwima-Mponua | District | Nyinahin | | |
| Atwima-Nwabiagya | Municipal | Nkawie | | |
| Atwima-Nwabiagya North | District | Barekese | 2018 | |
| Bekwai | Municipal | Bekwai | | |
| Bosome Freho | District | Asiwa | | |
| Bosomtwe | District | Kuntanase | | |
| Ejisu | Municipal | Ejisu | | |
| Ejura/Sekyedumase | Municipal | Ejura | | |
| Juaben | Municipal | Juaben | 2018 | |
| Kumasi | Metropolitan | Kumasi | | |
| Kwabre East | Municipal | Mamponteng | | |
| Kwadaso | Municipal | Kwadaso | 2018 | |
| Mampong | Municipal | Mampong | | |
| Obuasi East | Municipal | Tutuka | 2018 | |
| Obuasi | Municipal | Obuasi | 2004 | |
| Offinso | Municipal | Offinso | 2007 | |
| Offinso North | District | Akomadan | | |
| Oforikrom | Municipal | Oforikrom | 2018 | |
| Old Tafo | Municipal | Old Tafo | 2018 | |
| Sekyere Afram Plains | District | Drobonso | 28 June 2012 | |
| Sekyere Central | District | Nsuta | | |
| Sekyere East | District | Effiduase | 1988 | |
| Sekyere Kumawu | District | Kumawu | 2008 | |
| Sekyere South | District | Agona | | |
| Suame | Municipal | Suame | 2018 | |

=== Bono Region ===
Bono Region in Ghana

The Bono Region of Ghana was created by a referendum in December 2018. It was part of the then Brong-Ahafo Region and contains 12 districts, 5 municipal and 7 ordinary districts. These are:

| District | Category | Capital | Established | Comments |
|---|---|---|---|---|
| Banda | District | Banda Ahenkro | | |
| Berekum East | Municipal | Berekum | | |
| Berekum West | District | Jinijini | | |
| Dormaa Central | Municipal | Dormaa Ahenkro | | |
| Dormaa East | District | Wamfie | | |
| Dormaa West | District | Nkrankwanta | | |
| Jaman North | District | Sampa | | |
| Jaman South | Municipal | Drobo | | |
| Sunyani | Municipal | Sunyani | | Regional capital |
| Sunyani West | District | Odumase | | |
| Tain | District | Nsawkaw | | |
| Wenchi | Municipal | Wenchi | | |

=== Bono East Region ===
Bono East Region in Ghana

The Bono East Region of Ghana was created by a referendum in December 2018. It was part of the then Brong-Ahafo Region of Ghana and contains 11 districts, 4 municipal and 7 ordinary districts. These are:

| District | Category | Capital | Established | Comments |
|---|---|---|---|---|
| Atebubu-Amantin | Municipal | Atebubu | | |
| Kintampo North | Municipal | Kintampo | | |
| Kintampo South | District | Jema | | |
| Nkoranza North | District | Busunya | | |
| Nkoranza South | Municipal | Nkoranza | | |
| Pru East | District | Yeji | | |
| Pru West | District | Prang | | |
| Sene East | District | Kajaji | | |
| Sene West | District | Kwame Danso | | |
| Techiman | Municipal | Techiman | | Regional capital |
| Techiman North | District | Tuobodom | | |

=== Central Region ===
Districts of the Central Region

The Central Region of Ghana contains 22 districts. These are made up of 1 metropolitan, 7 municipal and 14 ordinary districts. There were formally 20 districts in this region.

| District | Category | Capital | Established | Comments |
|---|---|---|---|---|
| Abura/Asebu/Kwamankese | District | Abura-Dunkwa | 1988 | |
| Agona East | District | Nsaba | | |
| Agona West Municipal | Municipal | Agona Swedru | | |
| Ajumako/Enyan/Essiam | District | Ajumako | | |
| Asikuma Odoben Brakwa | District | Breman Asikuma | 2 November 1988 | |
| Assin Central | Municipal | Assin Foso | | |
| Assin North | District | Assin Bereku | 15 March 2018 | |
| Assin South | District | Nsuaem Kyekyewere | | |
| Awutu Senya East | Municipal | Kasoa | 28 June 2012 | |
| Awutu Senya West | District | Awutu Breku | | |
| Cape Coast | Metropolitan | Cape Coast | | Municipal 1987; Metropolitan 2007 |
| Effutu | Municipal | Winneba | | |
| Ekumfi | District | Esakyir | June 2012 | |
| Gomoa East | District | Potsin | 2018 | |
| Gomoa Central | District | Afransi | 29 February 2008 | |
| Gomoa West | District | Apam | | |
| Komenda/Edina/Eguafo/Abirem | Municipal | Elmina | | |
| Mfantsiman | Municipal | Saltpond | | |
| Twifo Atti Morkwa | District | Twifo Praso | 2012 | |
| Twifo/Hemang/Lower Denkyira | District | Hemang | | |
| Upper Denkyira East | Municipal | Dunkwa-on-Offin | February 2008 | |
| Upper Denkyira West | District | Diaso | | |

=== Eastern Region ===
Districts of the Eastern Region

The Eastern Region of Ghana contains 33 districts made up of 13 municipal and 20 ordinary districts. These are:

| District | Category | Capital | Established | Comments |
|---|---|---|---|---|
| Abuakwa North | Municipal | Kukurantumi | 2018 | |
| Abuakwa South | Municipal | Kibi | | Municipal status 2008 |
| Achiase | District | Achiase | | |
| Akuapim North | Municipal | Akropong | 1988 | Municipal status 15 March 2012 |
| Akuapim South | District | Aburi | 2012 | |
| Akyemansa | District | Ofoase | 2008 | |
| Asene Manso Akroso | District | Manso | 2018 | |
| Asuogyaman | District | Atimpoku | | |
| Atiwa East | District | Anyinam | 2018 | |
| Atiwa West | District | Kwabeng | 2008 | |
| Ayensuano | District | Coaltar | 28 June 2012 | |
| Birim Central | Municipal | Akim Oda | 2007 | |
| Birim North | District | New Abirem | | |
| Birim South | District | Akim Swedru | 2008 | |
| Denkyembour | District | Akwatia | 28 June 2012 | |
| Fanteakwa North | District | Begoro | | |
| Fanteakwa South | District | Osino | 2018 | |
| Kwaebibirem | Municipal | Kade | 1988 | |
| Kwahu Afram Plains North | District | Donkorkrom | | |
| Kwahu Afram Plains South | District | Tease | 28 June 2012 | |
| Kwahu East | District | Abetifi | | |
| Kwahu South | District | Mpraeso | | |
| Kwahu West | Municipal | Nkawkaw | | |
| Lower Manya Krobo | Municipal | Krobo Odumase | | |
| New Juaben North | Municipal | Effiduase | 2018 | |
| New Juaben South | Municipal | Koforidua | 1988 | |
| Nsawam Adoagyire | Municipal | Nsawam | | |
| Okere | District | Adukrom | 15 March 2018 | |
| Suhum | Municipal | Suhum, Ghana | July 2012 | |
| Upper Manya Krobo | District | Asesewa | | |
| Upper West Akim | District | Adeiso | 28 June 2012 | |
| West Akim | Municipal | Asamankese | | |
| Yilo-Krobo | Municipal | Somanya | | |

=== Greater Accra Region ===
Districts of the Greater Accra Region

The Greater Accra Region of Ghana contains 29 districts made up of 2 metropolitan, 23 municipal and 4 ordinary districts. These are:

| District | Category | Capital | Established | Comments |
|---|---|---|---|---|
| Ablekuma Central | Municipal | Lartebiokorshie | 19 February 2019 | |
| Ablekuma North | Municipal | Darkuman | | |
| Ablekuma West | Municipal | Dansoman | | |
| Accra | Metropolitan | Accra | | |
| Ada East | District | Ada Foah | | |
| Ada West | District | Sege | | |
| Adenta | Municipal | Adenta | 2008 | |
| Ashaiman | Municipal | Ashaiman | 2008 | |
| Ayawaso Central | Municipal | Kokomlemle | 9 February 2019 | |
| Ayawaso East | Municipal | Nima | | |
| Ayawaso North | Municipal | Accra New Town | | |
| Ayawaso West | Municipal | Dzorwulu | | |
| Ga Central | Municipal | Sowutuom | | |
| Ga East | Municipal | Abokobi | | |
| Ga North | Municipal | Amomole | | |
| Ga South | Municipal | Ngleshie Amanfro | 2008 | |
| Ga West | Municipal | Amasaman | | |
| Korle-Klottey | Municipal | Osu | 19 February 2019 | |
| Kpone-Katamanso | Municipal | Kpone | | |
| Krowor | Municipal | Nungua | 2008 | |
| La-Dade-Kotopon | Municipal | La | | |
| La-Nkwantanang-Madina | Municipal | Madina | | |
| Ledzokuku | Municipal | Teshie | 2008 | |
| Ningo-Prampram | District | Prampram | | |
| Okaikwei North | Municipal | Tesano | | |
| Shai-Osudoku | District | Dodowa | | |
| Tema Metropolitan | Metropolitan | Tema | | |
| Tema West | Municipal | Tema Community 18 | | |
| Weija Gbawe | Municipal | Weija | | |

=== Northern Region ===
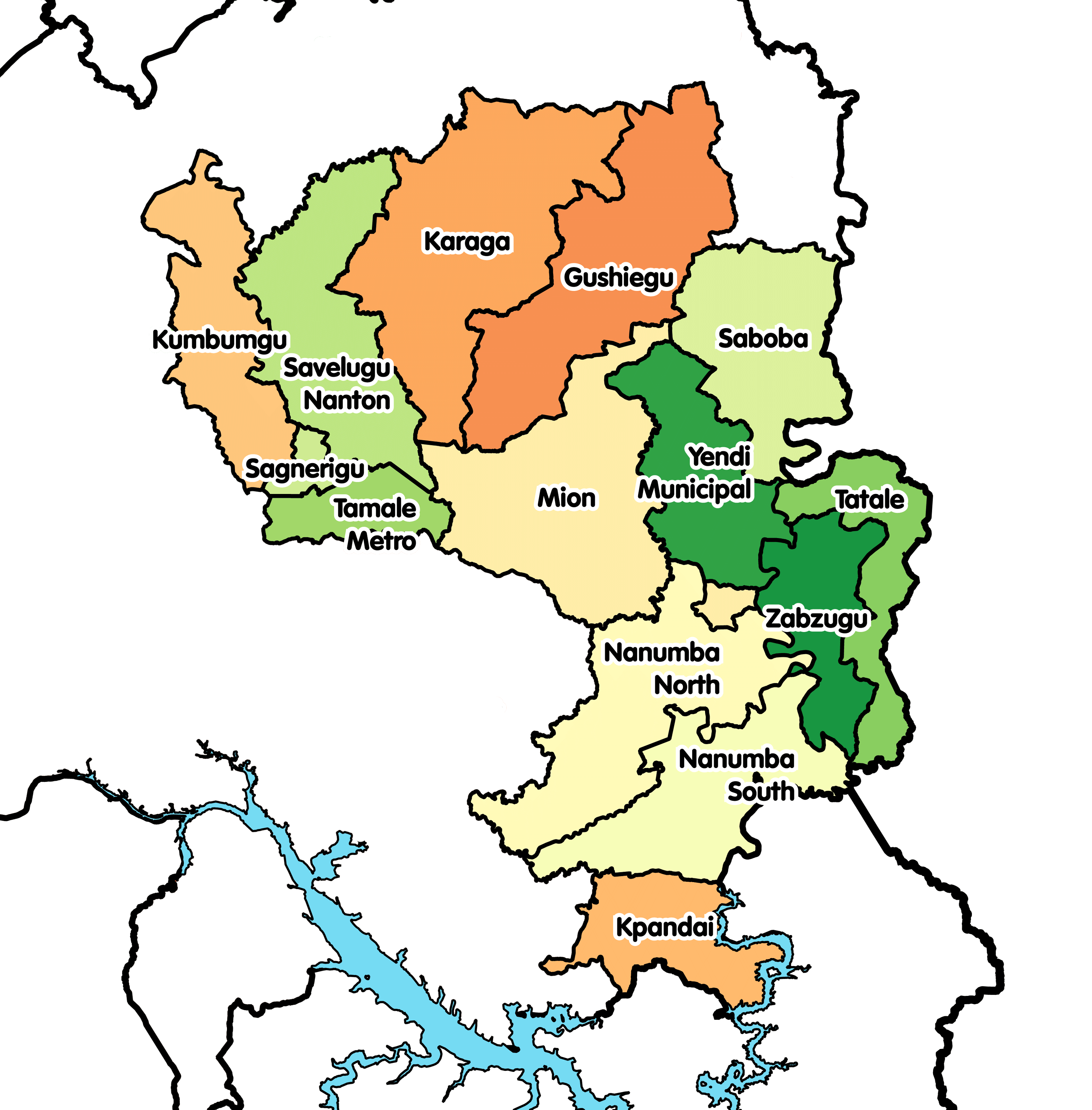
Districts of the Northern Region

The Northern Region of Ghana contains 16 districts; 1 metropolitan, 5 municipal and 10 ordinary districts. These are:

| District | Category | Capital | Established | Comments |
|---|---|---|---|---|
| Gushegu Municipal | Municipal | Gushegu | | |
| Karaga | District | Karaga | | |
| Kpandai | District | Kpandai | 29 February 2008 | |
| Kumbungu | District | Kumbungu | 28 June 2012 | |
| Mion | District | Sang | | |
| Nanton | District | Nanton | 15 March 2018 | |
| Nanumba North Municipal | Municipal | Bimbilla | 2004 | |
| Nanumba South | District | Wulensi | 2004 | |
| Saboba | District | Saboba | 1988 | |
| Sagnarigu Municipal | Municipal | Sagnarigu | | |
| Savelugu Municipal | Municipal | Savelugu | | |
| Tamale Metropolitan | Metropolitan | Tamale | | Metropolis since 2004 |
| Tatale Sanguli | District | Tatale | 28 June 2012 | |
| Tolon | District | Tolon | 2011 | |
| Yendi Municipal | Municipal | Yendi | 1988 | |
| Zabzugu | District | Zabzugu | 2012 | |

=== North East Region ===
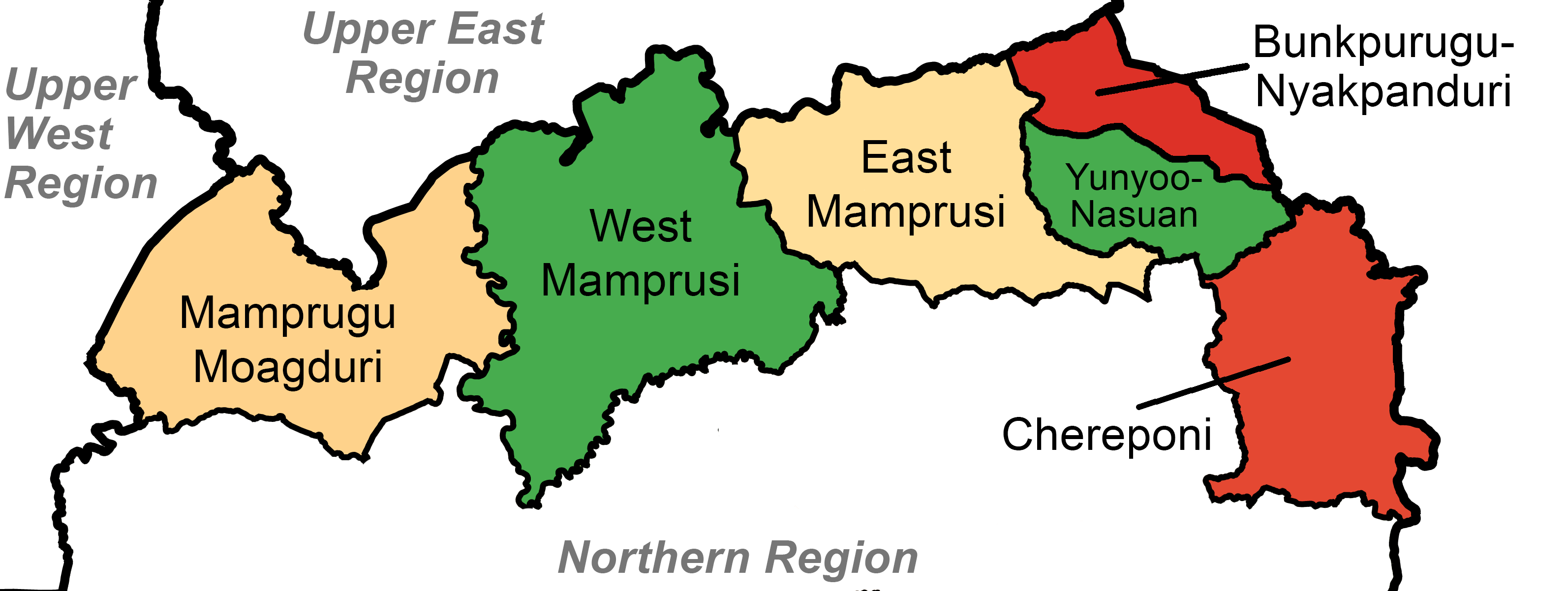
Districts of the North East Region

The North East Region of Ghana was created by a referendum in December 2018. It was part of the then Northern Region of Ghana. It contains 6 districts, 2 municipal and 4 ordinary districts. These are:

| District | Category | Capital | Established | Comments |
|---|---|---|---|---|
| Bunkpurugu Nyankpanduri | District | Bunkpurugu | August 2004 | |
| Chereponi | District | Chereponi | | |
| East Mamprusi | Municipal | Nalerigu | 2004 | One of the oldest districts. Municipal status in 2004 |
| Mamprugu Moagduri | District | Yagaba | 28 June 2012 | |
| West Mamprusi | Municipal | Walewale | 1988 | |
| Yunyoo-Nasuan | District | Yunyoo | 15 March 2018 | |

=== Oti Region ===
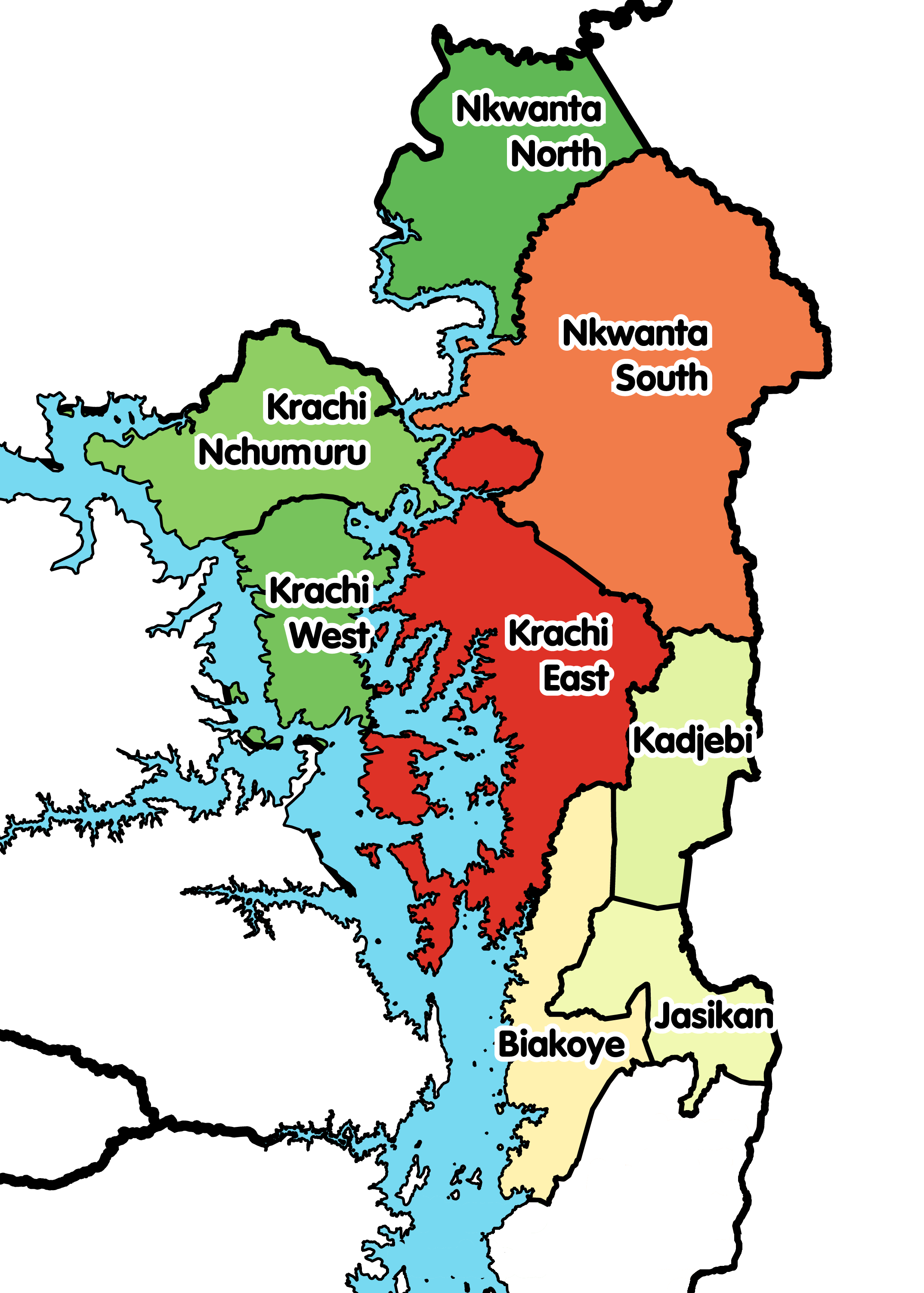
Districts of the Oti Region

The Oti Region of Ghana was created by a referendum in December 2018. It was part of the then Volta Region of Ghana. It contains 9 districts, 4 municipal and 5 ordinary districts. These are:

| District | Category | Capital | Established | Comments |
|---|---|---|---|---|
| Biakoye | District | Nkonya Ahenkro | 2008 | |
| Guan | District | Likpe-Mate | 2021 | |
| Jasikan | Municipal | Jasikan | | |
| Kadjebi | District | Kadjebi | | |
| Krachi East | Municipal | Dambai | | |
| Krachi Nchumuru | District | Chinderi | | |
| Krachi West | Municipal | Kete Krachi | | |
| Nkwanta North | District | Kpassa | | |
| Nkwanta South | Municipal | Nkwanta | | |

=== Savannah Region ===
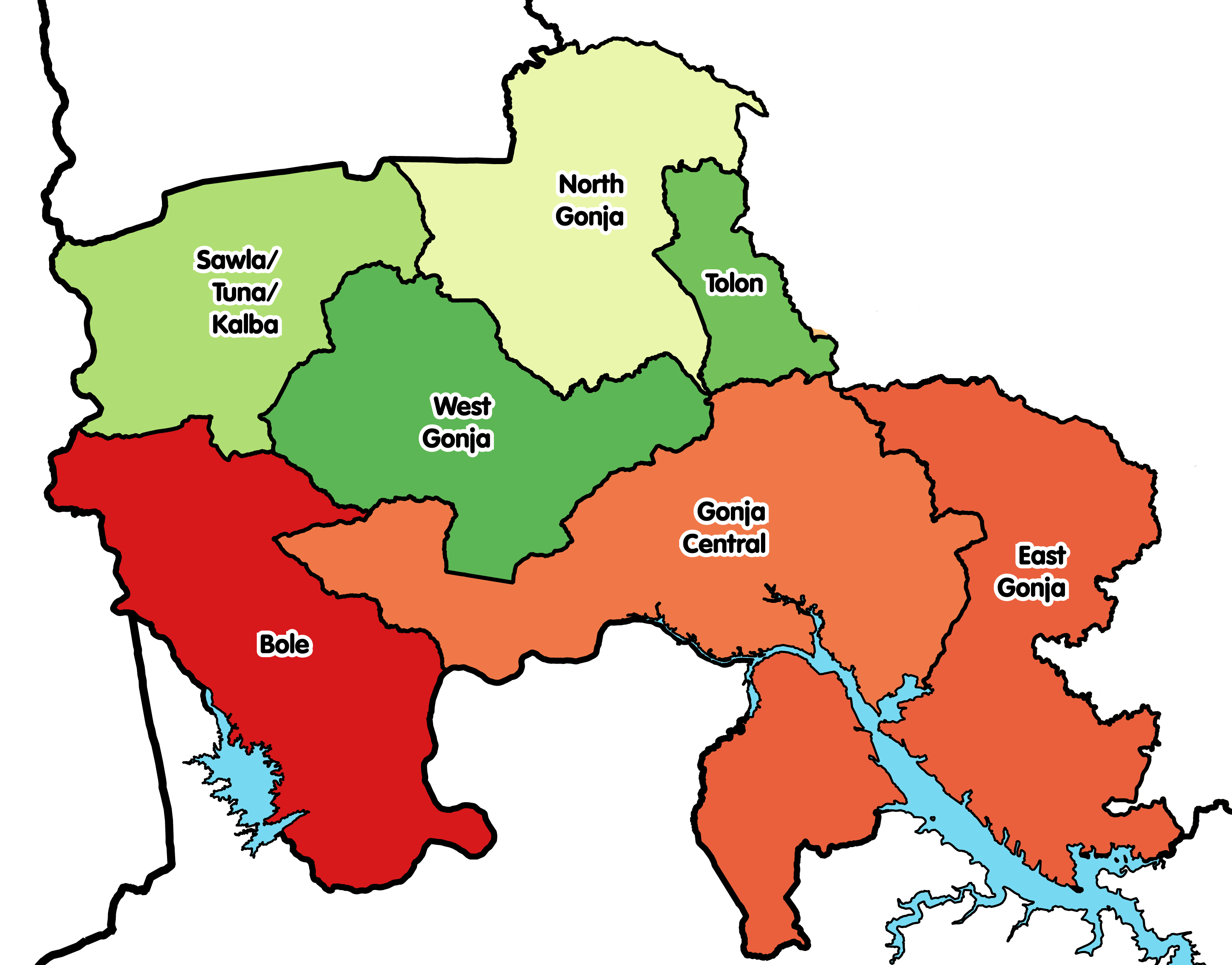
Districts of the Savannah Region

The Savannah Region of Ghana was created by a referendum in December 2018. It was part of then Northern Region of Ghana. It contains 7 districts, 1 municipal and 6 ordinary districts. These are:

| District | Category | Capital | Established | Comments |
|---|---|---|---|---|
| Bole | District | Bole | | |
| Central Gonja | District | Buipe | | |
| East Gonja Municipal | Municipal | Salaga | 2007 | |
| North Gonja | District | Daboya | 28 June 2012 | |
| North East Gonja | District | Kpalbe | | |
| Sawla-Tuna-Kalba | District | Sawla | 2004 | |
| West Gonja | Municipal | Damongo | 2004 | |

=== Upper East Region ===
Districts of the Upper East Region

The Upper East Region of Ghana contains 15 districts, 4 municipal and 11 ordinary districts. There were 13 districts previously.

| District | Category | Capital | Established | Comments |
|---|---|---|---|---|
| Bawku Municipal | Municipal | Bawku | | |
| Bawku West | District | Zebilla | | |
| Binduri | District | Binduri | 2012 | |
| Bolgatanga East | District | Zuarungu | 2018 | |
| Bolgatanga Municipal | Municipal | Bolgatanga | 2004 | |
| Bongo | District | Bongo | 1988 | |
| Builsa North Municipal | Municipal | Sandema | | |
| Builsa South | District | Fumbisi | | |
| Garu | District | Garu | | |
| Kassena-Nankana Municipal | Municipal | Navrongo | | |
| Kassena-Nankana West | District | Paga | 2008 | |
| Nabdam | District | Nangodi | | |
| Pusiga | District | Pusiga | | |
| Talensi | District | Tongo | | |
| Tempane | District | Tempane | | |

=== Upper West Region ===
Districts of the Upper West Region

The Upper West Region of Ghana contains 11 districts, 5 municipal and 6 ordinary districts. These are:

| District | Category | Capital | Established | Comments |
|---|---|---|---|---|
| Daffiama Bussie Issa | District | Issa | | |
| Jirapa Municipal | Municipal | Jirapa | | |
| Lambussie Karni | District | Lambussie | | |
| Lawra Municipal | Municipal | Lawra | | |
| Nadowli-Kaleo | District | Nadowli | | |
| Nandom Municipal | Municipal | Nandom | | |
| Sissala East Municipal | Municipal | Tumu | | |
| Sissala West | District | Gwollu | | |
| Wa East | District | Funsi | | |
| Wa Municipal | Municipal | Wa | | |
| Wa West | District | Wechiau | | |

=== Volta Region ===
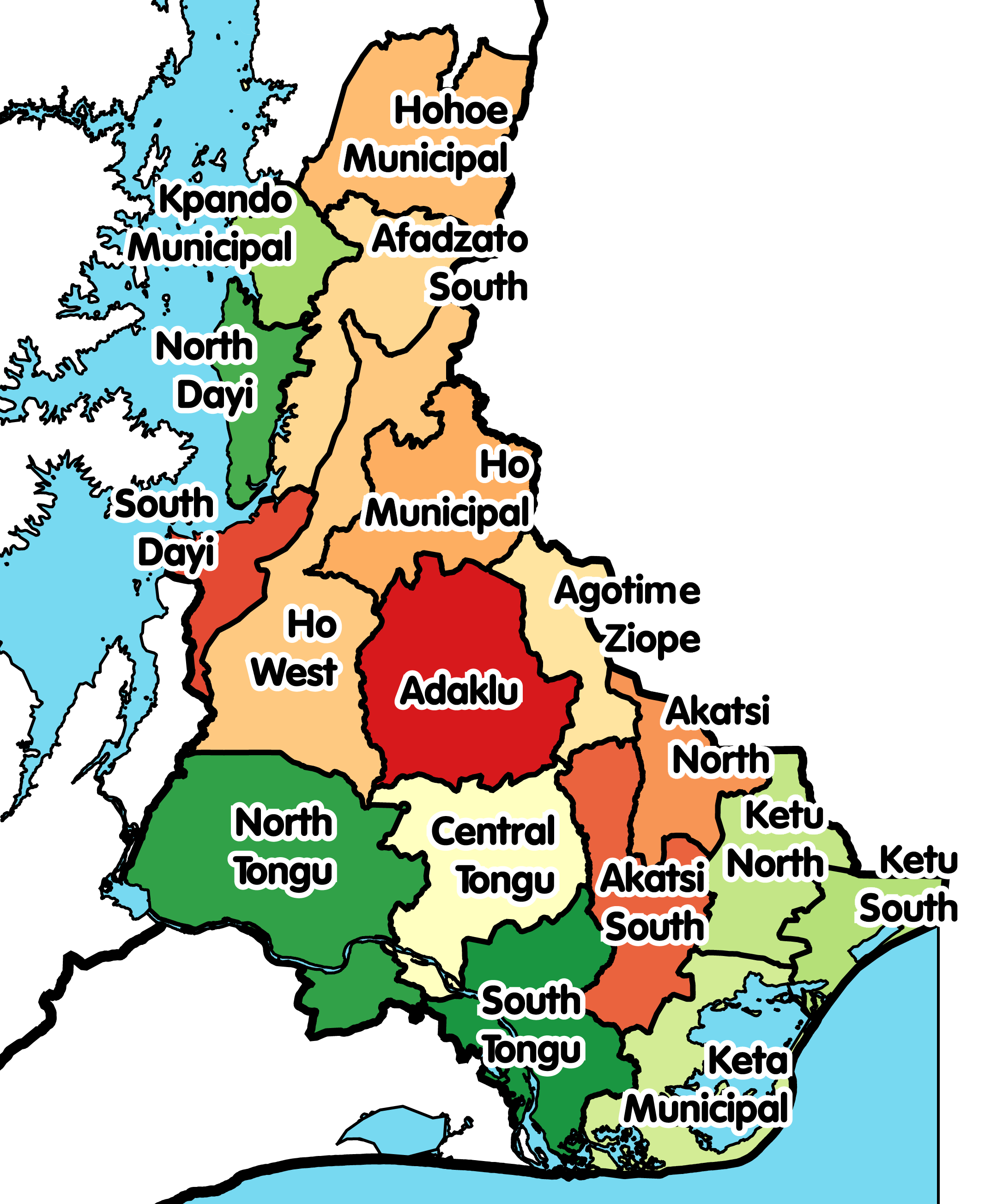
Districts of the Volta Region

The Volta Region of Ghana used to contain 17 districts, 5 municipal and 20 ordinary districts. It now has a total of 18 districts made up of 6 municipal and 12 ordinary districts since the regional demarcation in December 2018

| District | Category | Capital | Established | Comments |
|---|---|---|---|---|
| Adaklu District | District | Adaklu Waya | 2012 | |
| Afadzato South | District | Ve Golokwati | 2012 | |
| Agotime Ziope | District | Kpetoe | 2012 | |
| Akatsi North | District | Ave-Dakpa | 28 June 2012 | |
| Akatsi South | District | Akatsi | 15 March 2012 | |
| Anloga | District | Anloga | 2019 | |
| Central Tongu | District | Adidome | February 2012 | |
| Ho Municipal | Municipal | Ho | | |
| Ho West | District | Dzolokpuita | 2012 | |
| Hohoe Municipal | Municipal | Hohoe | | |
| Keta Municipal | Municipal | Keta | | |
| Ketu North Municipal | Municipal | Dzodze | 2008 | |
| Ketu South Municipal | Municipal | Denu | 1989 | |
| Kpando Municipal | Municipal | Kpando | | |
| North Dayi | District | Anfoega | 2012 | |
| North Tongu | District | Battor Dugame | 2012 | |
| South Dayi | District | Kpeve | 19 August 2004 | |
| South Tongu | District | Sogakope | 1989 | |

=== Western Region ===
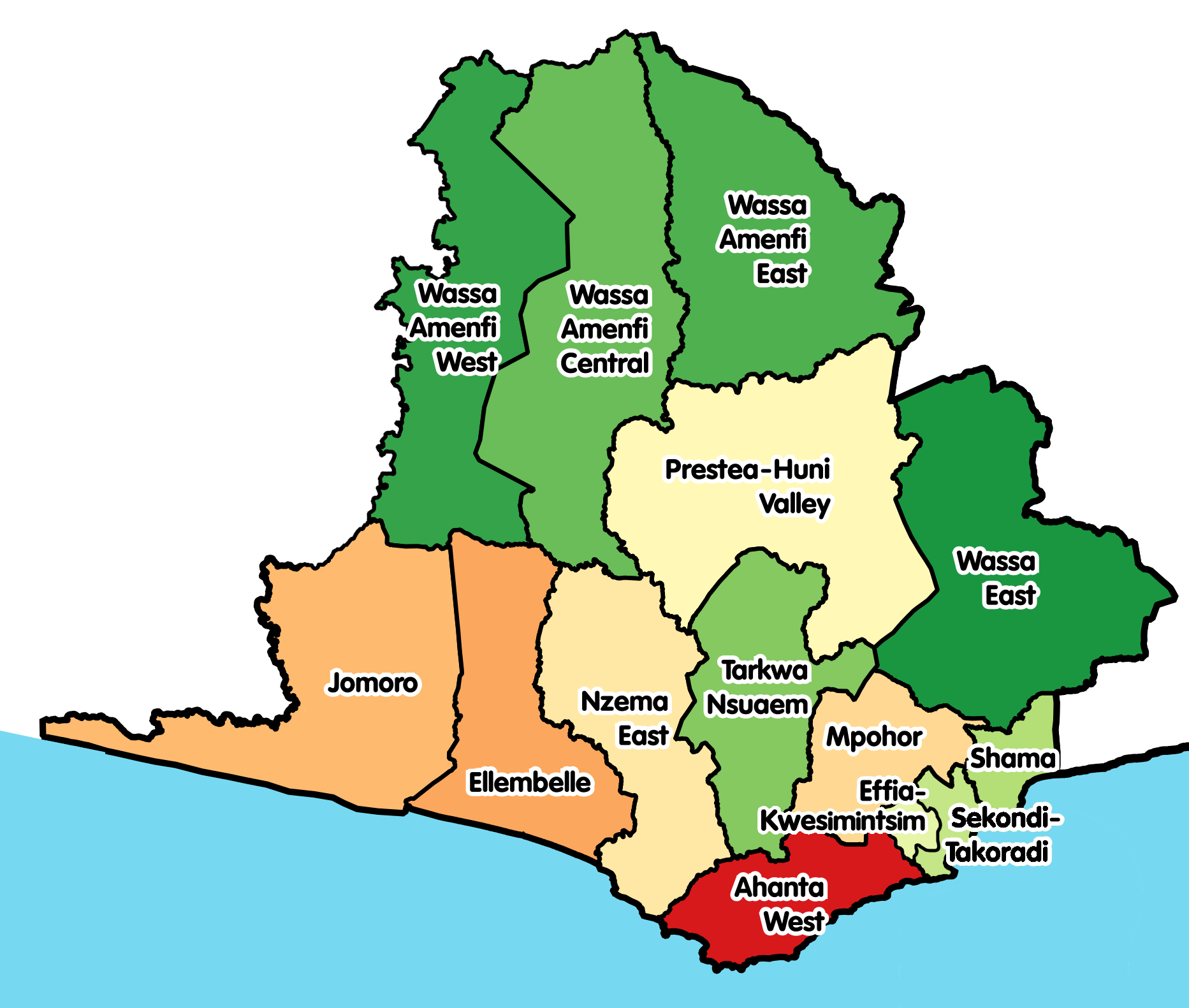
Districts of the Western Region

The Western Region of Ghana contains 14 districts, 1 metropolitan, 8 municipal and 5 ordinary districts. These are:

| District | Category | Capital | Established | Comments |
|---|---|---|---|---|
| Ahanta West | Municipal | Agona Ahanta | | |
| Amenfi Central | District | Manso Amenfi | | |
| Amenfi West | Municipal | Asankragua | | |
| Effia Kwesimintsim Municipal | Municipal | Kwesimintsim | | |
| Ellembelle | District | Nkroful | | |
| Jomoro | Municipal | Half Assini | | |
| Mpohor | District | Mpohor | | |
| Nzema East Municipal | Municipal | Axim | | |
| Prestea-Huni Valley Municipal | Municipal | Prestea | | |
| Sekondi Takoradi Metropolitan | Metropolitan | Sekondi-Takoradi | | |
| Shama | District | Shama | | |
| Tarkwa-Nsuaem Municipal | Municipal | Tarkwa | | |
| Wassa Amenfi East | Municipal | Wassa-Akropong | | |
| Wassa East | District | Daboase | | |

=== Western North Region ===
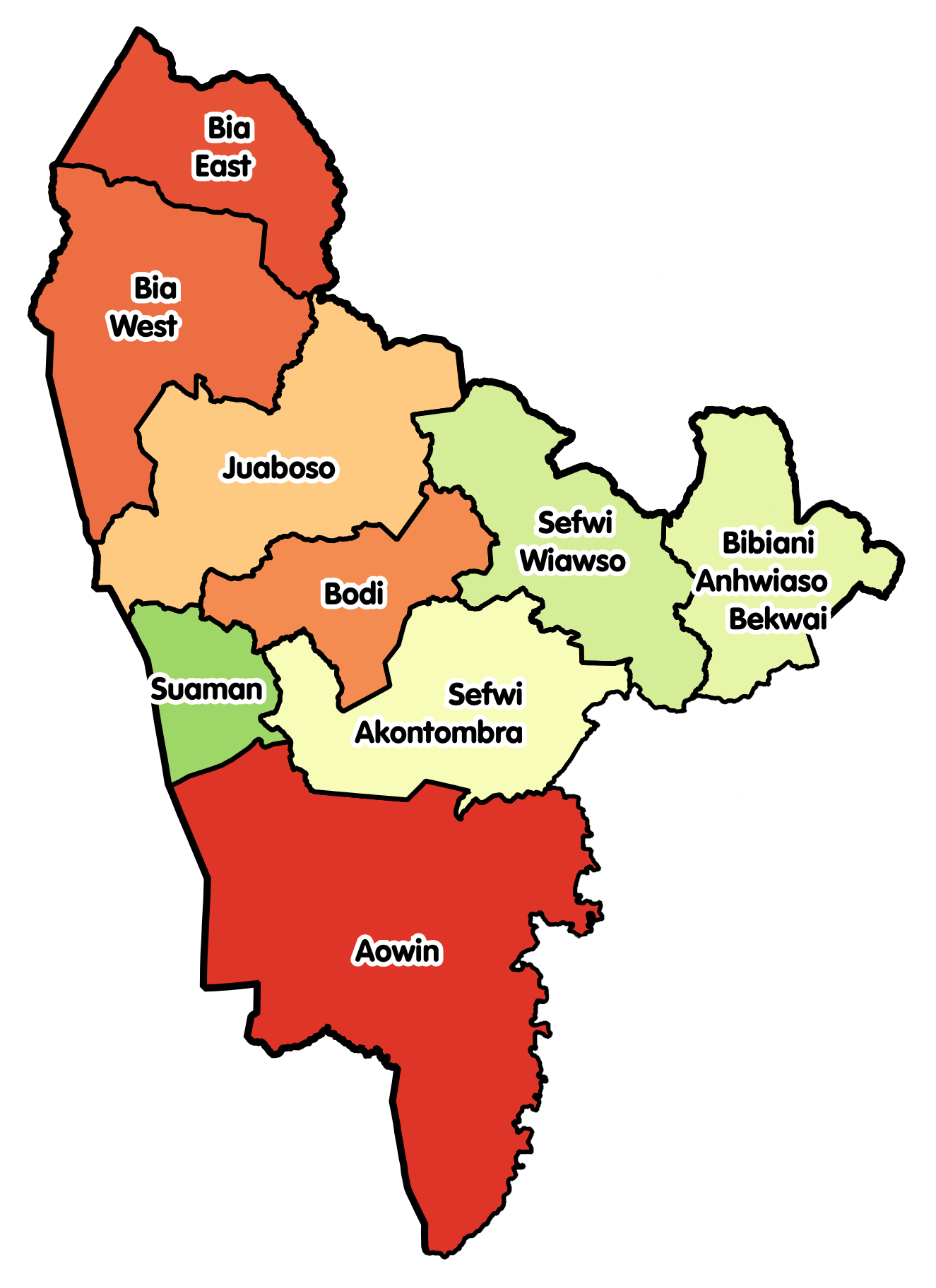
Western North Region

The Western North Region of Ghana was created by a referendum in December 2018. It was part of the then Western Region of Ghana. It contains 9 districts, 3 municipal and 6 ordinary districts. These are:

| District | Category | Capital | Established | Comments |
|---|---|---|---|---|
| Aowin | Municipal | Enchi | 2012 | Municipal status 2017 |
| Bia East | District | Sefwi Adabokrom | 28 June 2012 | |
| Bia West | District | Essam-Debiso | 2012 | |
| Bibiani Anhwiaso Bekwai | Municipal | Bibiani | 1988 | |
| Bodi | District | Sefwi Bodi | 28 June 2012 | |
| Juaboso | District | Juaboso | | |
| Sefwi Akontombra | District | Sefwi Akontombra | | |
| Sefwi-Wiawso | Municipal | Sefwi Wiawso | | |
| Suaman | District | Dadieso | 28 June 2012 | |

== See also ==
- Regions of Ghana
- Administrative divisions of Ghana
