= Ablekuma North Municipal Assembly =

- Municipal District
- Districts of Greater Accra Region

- Location of Ablekuma North Municipal Assembly within Greater Accra
- Coordinates: 5°35′N 0°15′W
- Country: Ghana
- Region: Greater Accra
- Capital: Darkuman Kokompe

Area
  - Total: 11 km^{2} (4.2 sq mi)

Population (2021)
  - Total: 159,208
  - Density: 14,000/km^{2} (37,000/sq mi)
- Time zone: UTC+0 (GMT)
- ISO 3166 code: GH-EP-__

Ablekuma North Municipal Assembly is one of the twenty-nine districts in Greater Accra Region, Ghana. Originally it was formerly part of the then-larger Accra Metropolitan District in 1988, until a small portion of the district was split off to create Ablekuma North Municipal District on 15 March 2018; thus the remaining part has been retained as Accra Metropolitan District. The municipality is located in the central part of Greater Accra Region and has Darkuman Kokompe as its capital town.
