= Okaikwei North Municipal District =

- Municipal District
- Districts of Greater Accra Region

- Location of Okaikwei North Municipal District within Greater Accra
- Coordinates: 5°36′23″N 0°15′5″W
- Country: Ghana
- Region: Greater Accra
- Capital: Abeka

Population (2021)
  - Total: 160,446
- Time zone: UTC+0 (GMT)
- ISO 3166 code: GH-EP-__

Okaikwei North Municipal District is one of the twenty-nine districts in Greater Accra Region, Ghana. Originally it was formerly part of the then-larger Accra Metropolitan District in 1988, until a small portion of the district was split off to create Okaikwei North Municipal District on 15 March 2018; thus the remaining part has been retained as Accra Metropolitan District. The municipality is located in the central part of Greater Accra Region and has Abeka as its capital town.
