= Ayawaso North Municipal Assembly =

- Municipal District
- Districts of Greater Accra Region

- Location of Ayawaso North Municipal Assembly within Greater Accra
- Coordinates: 5°35′N 0°13′W
- Country: Ghana
- Region: Greater Accra
- Capital: Accra Newtown

Population (2021)
  - Total: 63,386
- Time zone: UTC+0 (GMT)
- ISO 3166 code: GH-EP-__

Ayawaso North Municipal Assembly is one of the twenty-nine districts in Greater Accra Region, Ghana. Originally it was formerly part of the then-larger Accra Metropolitan Assembly in 1988, until a small portion of the district was split off to create Ayawaso North Municipal Assembly on 15 March 2018; thus the remaining part has been retained as Accra Metropolitan District. The municipality is located in the central part of Greater Accra Region and has Accra Newtown as its capital town.
