= La Dade Kotopon Municipal Assembly =

La-Dade-Kotopon Municipal Assembly
- Municipal Assembly
- Seal

- Districts of Greater Accra Region

- Location of La-Dade-Kotopon Municipal Assembly within Greater Accra
- Coordinates: 5°35′N 0°6′W
- Country: Ghana
- Region: Greater Accra
- Capital: La

Government
  - Municipal Chief Executive: Gladys TsoTsoo Mann-Dedey

Area
  - Total: 36.03 km^{2} (13.91 sq mi)

Population (2021)
  - Total: 140,264
- Time zone: UTC+0 (GMT)
- ISO 3166 code: GH-EP-LD
- Website: Official Website

La Dade Kotopon Municipal Assembly is one of the twenty-nine districts in Greater Accra Region, Ghana. Originally it was formerly part of the then-larger Accra Metropolitan Assembly in 1988 (later as a sub-metropolitan district council on 2003), until the eastern portion of the district was split off to create La Dade Kotopon Municipal Assembly on 28 June 2012; thus the remaining part has been retained as Accra Metropolitan Assembly. The municipality is located in the central part of Greater Accra Region and has La as its capital town.

La Dade Kotopon is one of the twelve districts that make up the Accra Metropolitan Area, an area that serves as the capital of Ghana.

== Population ==
As of 2010, it had a census population of 183,528. The current population based Ghana Statistical Service record is 226,148. It spans an area of 36.03 km^{2} (13.91 mi^{2})

== Administration ==
The local authority of the district, the La Dade Kotopon Municipal Assembly, is currently headed by Gladys TsoTsoo Mann-Dedey, who was appointed by the President of the Republic of Ghana in 2017 as the Municipal Chief Executive and serves as the political head of the district.

Administratively, the district is one of the 25 local authority districts of the Greater Accra Metropolitan Area, which include Accra Metropolitan Assembly, Tema Metropolitan District, Ga South Municipal District, Ga Central Municipal Assembly, Ga West Municipal Assembly, Ga East Municipal District, Adentan Municipal District, Ashaiman Municipal District, La Nkwantanang Madina Municipal District, Ledzokuku-Krowor Municipal District, and Kpone Katamanso District.

== History ==
The La Dade Kotopon Municipal Assembly is one of the newly created districts established and simultaneously inaugurated on 28 June 2012 under the Legislative Instrument (LI 2133).

Under the local government arrangements when the Accra city council was created in 1953, six area councils were established namely Ablekuma, Ashiedu Keteke, Ayawaso, Okaikoi, Osu Klotey and Kpeshie (which comprised Teshie, Nungua and La). This system operated until 18 March 1989 when Accra was elevated to metropolitan district status and the area councils became sub-metropolitan district councils under Legislative Instrument 1500 of the new Local Government System (PNDCL 207) Act 462.

In 2003, part of the first schedule of the Accra Metropolitan Legislative Instrument of 1995 (LI 1615) was amended and replaced with Legislative Instrument 1722 of 2003 which led to the creation of 7 more sub-metropolitan district councils out of the existing 6. The Kpeshie sub-metropolitan district council was split into the Nungua, Teshie and La sub-metropolitan districts; the Ablekuma sub-metropolitan district council was split into the Ablekuma North, Ablekuma Central, and Ablekuma South sub-metropolitan districts; the Ayawaso sub-metropolitan district council was split into the Ayawaso Central, Ayawaso East, and Ayawaso West sub-metropolitan district council; and the Okaikoi sub-metropolitan district council was split into the Okaikoi North and Okaikoi South sub-metropolitan district council. This intervention was informed by the need to break up the district into smaller sectors to facilitate good governance.

In 2012, to promote efficiency in the administrative machinery and also meet the ever pressing demands for amenities and essential services, the La sub-metropolitan district council was carved out of the Accra Metropolitan District and upgraded to a Municipal status as the La Dade Kotopon Municipal District under Legislative Instrument 2133.

== Administrative Area ==
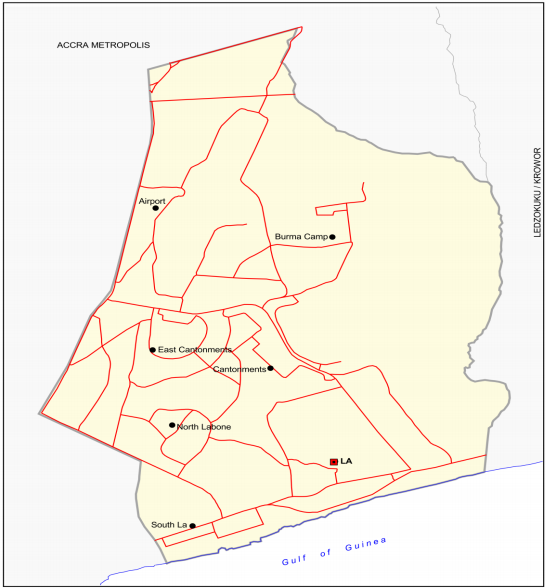
Communities within the La Dade Kotopon Municipal District

The district covers an area of 36.03 km^{2} (13.91 mi^{2}) and is bounded to the north and west by the Accra Metropolitan District, to the east by the Ledzokuku-Krowor Municipal District, and to the south by the Gulf of Guinea.

=== Communities ===
The largest 7 communities in the district by population are:

- La
- Burma Camp
- North Labone
- South La
- Cantonments
- Airport
- East Cantonments

=== Electoral Areas ===
The La Dade Kotopon Municipal District is made up of 20 electoral areas.

Constituency	Electoral Area
Dade Kotopon	Ako Adjei
Dade Kotopon	New Kaajarno
Dade Kotopon	Abafum/Abese/Kowe
Dade Kotopon	New Lakpanaa
Dade Kotopon	Adiembra
Dade Kotopon	Mantiase/Tse Ado
Dade Kotopon	Adobetor
Dade Kotopon	Labone
Dade Kotopon	Cantonments
Dade Kotopon	Burma Camp

== Demographics ==
At the 2010 census, there were 183,528 people residing in the district.

== Governance ==
The La Dade Kotopon Municipal district is administered by the La Dade Kotopon Municipal Assembly, which is the political and administrative authority for the district.

== Climate ==
Climate chart (precipitation, max. and min. temperature)
J	F	M	A	M	J	J	A	S	O	N	D
15 31 23	33 31 24	56 31 24	81 31 24	142 31 24	178 29 23	46 27 23	15 27 22	36 27 23	64 29 23	36 31 24	23 31 24
- █ Average max. and min. temperatures in °C
- █ Precipitation totals in mm
- Source: BBC Weather
Imperial conversion
J	F	M	A	M	J	J	A	S	O	N	D
0.6 87 73	1.3 88 75	2.2 88 76	3.2 88 76	5.6 87 75	7 84 74	1.8 81 74	0.6 80 71	1.4 81 73	2.5 85 74	1.4 87 75	0.9 88 75
- █ Average max. and min. temperatures in °F
- █ Precipitation totals in inches

La Dade Kotopon lies in the Coastal Grassland zone, which experiences a double maxima rainy season pattern. The district features a tropical savanna climate (Köppen climate classification Aw) that borders on a hot semi-arid climate (BSh). The average annual rainfall is about 730 mm, which falls primarily during Ghana's two rainy seasons. The chief rainy season begins in April and ends in mid-July, whilst a weaker second rainy season occurs in October. Rain usually falls in short intensive storms and causes local flooding in which drainage channels are obstructed.

Very little variation in temperature occurs throughout the year. The mean monthly temperature ranges from 25.9 °C (78.6 °F) in August (the coolest) to 29.6 °C (85.3 °F) in March (the hottest), with an annual average of 27.6 °C (81.7 °F). The "cooler" months tend to be more humid than the warmer months. As a result, during the warmer months and particularly during the windy harmattan season, the district experiences a breezy "dry heat" that feels less warm than the "cooler" but more humid rainy season.

As a coastal district, La Dade Kotopon is vulnerable to the impacts of climate change and sea level rise. Drainage infrastructure is particularly at risk, which has profound implications for people's livelihoods, especially in informal settlements. Inadequate planning regulation and law enforcement, as well as perceived corruption in government processes, lack of communication across government departments and lack of concern or government co-ordination with respect to building codes are major impediments to progressing the development of the district's drainage infrastructure, according to the Climate & Development Knowledge Network.

As La Dade Kotopon is close to the equator, the daylight hours are practically uniform during the year. Relative humidity is generally high, varying from 65% in the midafternoon to 95% at night. The predominant wind direction in the district is from the WSW to NNE sectors. Wind speeds normally range between 8 and 16 km/h. High wind gusts occur with thunderstorms, which generally pass in squalls along the coast.
