= Ablekuma West Municipal Assembly =

- Municipal District
- Districts of Greater Accra Region

- Location of Ablekuma West Municipal Assembly within Greater Accra
- Coordinates: 5°33′N 0°16′W
- Country: Ghana
- Region: Greater Accra
- Capital: Dansoman

Area
  - Total: 10 km^{2} (3.9 sq mi)

Population (2021)
  - Total: 153,490
  - Density: 15,000/km^{2} (40,000/sq mi)
- Time zone: UTC+0 (GMT)
- ISO 3166 code: GH-EP-__

Ablekuma West Municipal Assembly is one of the twenty-nine districts in Greater Accra Region, Ghana. Originally it was formerly part of the then-larger Accra Metropolitan Assembly in 1988, until a small portion of the district was split off to create Ablekuma West Municipal District on 15 March 2018; thus the remaining part has been retained as Accra Metropolitan District. The municipality is located in the central part of Greater Accra Region and has Dansoman as its capital town.
