= Ledzokuku Municipal District =

- Municipal District
- Districts of Greater Accra Region

- Location of Ledzokuku Municipal District within Greater Accra
- Coordinates: 5°35′N 0°5′W
- Country: Ghana
- Region: Greater Accra
- Capital: Teshie-Nungua

Population (2021)
  - Total: 217,304
- Time zone: UTC+0 (GMT)
- ISO 3166 code: GH-EP-__

Ledzokuku Municipal District is one of the twenty-nine districts in Greater Accra Region, Ghana. Originally it was formerly part of the defunct Ledzokuku-Krowor Municipal District on 29 February 2008 (which was created from Accra Metropolitan District on 1988), until part of the district was split off to create Krowor Municipal District on 15 March 2018; thus the remaining part has been renamed as Ledzokuku Municipal District. The municipality is located in the central part of Greater Accra Region and has Teshie-Nungua as its capital town.
