= Accra Metropolitan Assembly =

Metropolitan Assembly

Accra Metropolitan Assembly (AMA) is the political and administrative authority for the city of Accra. The Accra Metropolitan Assembly has a general assembly which is constituted by about 102 members: two-thirds are elected representatives and one-third are government appointees. Accra Metropolitan Assembly is one of the Two Hundred and Sixty-One (261) Metropolitan, Municipal and District Assemblies (MMDAs) in Ghana.The Assembly has ten sub-metropolitan district councils which are subordinate to the general assembly. They perform functions assigned to them by the instrument that sets up the Assembly or delegated to them by the general assembly.

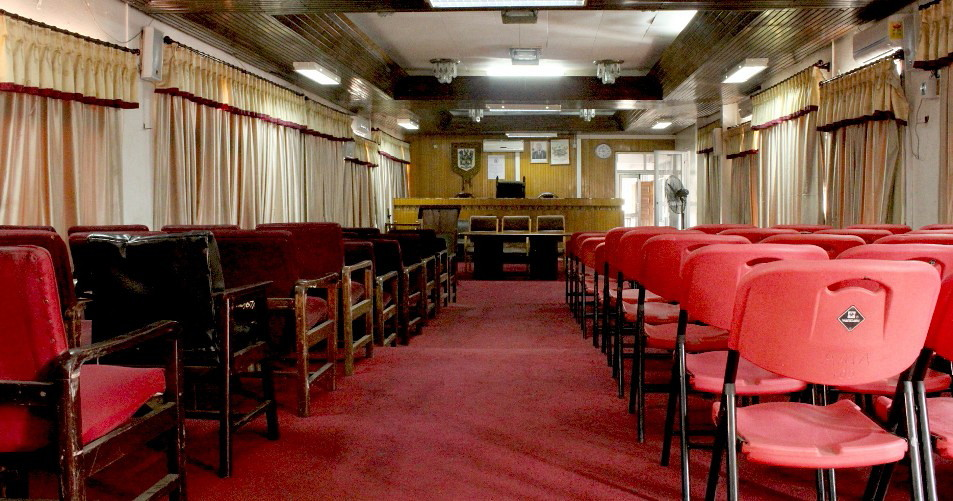
Assembly Hall of Accra Metropolitan Assembly

The Logo of Accra Metropolitan Assembly

Sub-Metro District Councils	Office Location
Ablekuma Central	Lartebiokorshie
Ablekuma West	Dansoman
Ablekuma North	Darkuman
Ablekuma South	Korle-Bu
Ashiedu Keteke	Jamestown
Ayawaso Central	Kokomlemle
Ayawaso East	Kanda
Ayawaso West	Abelemkpe
Okaikoi North	Abeka
Okaikoi South	North Industrial Area

== The Departments Of AMA ==
The Accra Metropolitan Assembly has (18) Statutory Departments; some of which are state entities decentralized and incorporated into the Local Assembly structure. Some of these Departments oversee other functional units.

Departments in AMA
Central Administration
Finance
Physical Planning
Metropolitan Health
Waste Management
Education, Youth and Sports
Social Welfare & Community Development
Agriculture
Education, Youth and Sports
Budget & Rating
Urban Roads
Metro Works
Industry & Trade
Parks and Gardens
Legal
Transport
Disaster Prevention & Management
GAMADA

The president of Ghana nominates a person for the office of Metropolitan Chief Executive. Then the nominee must be approved by at least two-thirds of the general assembly membership.

== Services ==
1. Environmental Health Service

2. Waste Management Service
