= Tema West Municipal District =

- District
- Districts of Greater Accra Region

- Location of Tema West Municipal District within Greater Accra
- Coordinates: 5°37′57.72″N 0°0′42.12″W
- Country: Ghana
- Region: Greater Accra
- Capital: Community 2

Population (2021)
  - Total: 196,224
- Time zone: UTC+0 (GMT)
- ISO 3166 code: GH-AA-TW

Tema West Municipal District is one of the twenty-nine districts in Greater Accra Region, Ghana. Originally it was formerly part of the then-larger Tema Municipal District, which was created from the former Tema District Council, until a small western portion of the district was split off to create Tema West Municipal District on 15 March 2018, which was established by Legislative Instrument (L.I.) 2317; thus the remaining part has been retained as Tema Metropolitan District. The municipality is located in the central part of Greater Accra Region and has Community 2 as its capital town.

== Sources ==
- "Districts of Ghana". Statoids.
- GhanaDistricts.com
