= Ayawaso East Municipal Assembly =

- Municipal District
- Districts of Greater Accra Region

- Location of Ayawaso East Municipal Assembly within Greater Accra
- Coordinates: 5°35′N 0°12′W
- Country: Ghana
- Region: Greater Accra
- Capital: Nima

Population (2021)
  - Total: 53,004
- Time zone: UTC+0 (GMT)
- ISO 3166 code: GH-EP-__

Ayawaso East Municipal Assembly is one of the twenty-nine districts in Greater Accra Region, Ghana. Originally it was formerly part of the then-larger Accra Metropolitan Assembly in 1988, until a small portion of the district was split off to create Ayawaso East Municipal Assembly on 15 March 2018; thus the remaining part has been retained as Accra Metropolitan Assembly. The municipality is located in the central part of Greater Accra Region and has Nima as its capital town.
