= Ga North Municipal Assembly =

- Municipal Assembly
- Districts of Greater Accra Region

- Location of Ga North Municipal Assembly within Greater Accra
- Coordinates: 5°39′48.24″N 0°15′55.44″W
- Country: Ghana
- Region: Greater Accra
- Capital: Ofankor

Population (2021)
  - Total: 235,292
- Time zone: UTC+0 (GMT)
- ISO 3166 code: GH-AA-GN

Ga North Municipal Assembly is one of the twenty-nine districts in Greater Accra Region, Ghana. Originally it was formerly part of the then-larger Ga West District in 2004, until the eastern part of the district was split off to create Ga North Municipal District on 15 March 2018, which was supported by Legislative Instrument (L.I.) 2314; thus the remaining part has been retained as Ga West Municipal Assembly. The municipality is located in the western part of Greater Accra Region and has Ofankor as its capital town.

== Schools in the Municipal Assembly ==
Reverend John Teye Memorial Institute

Pokuase Methodist Basic School

== Hospitals ==
- Ga North Municipal Hospital
- Amamorley Community Clinic
- Anglican Community Hospital at Pokuase
