= Greater Accra Region =

Region of Ghana

- Region
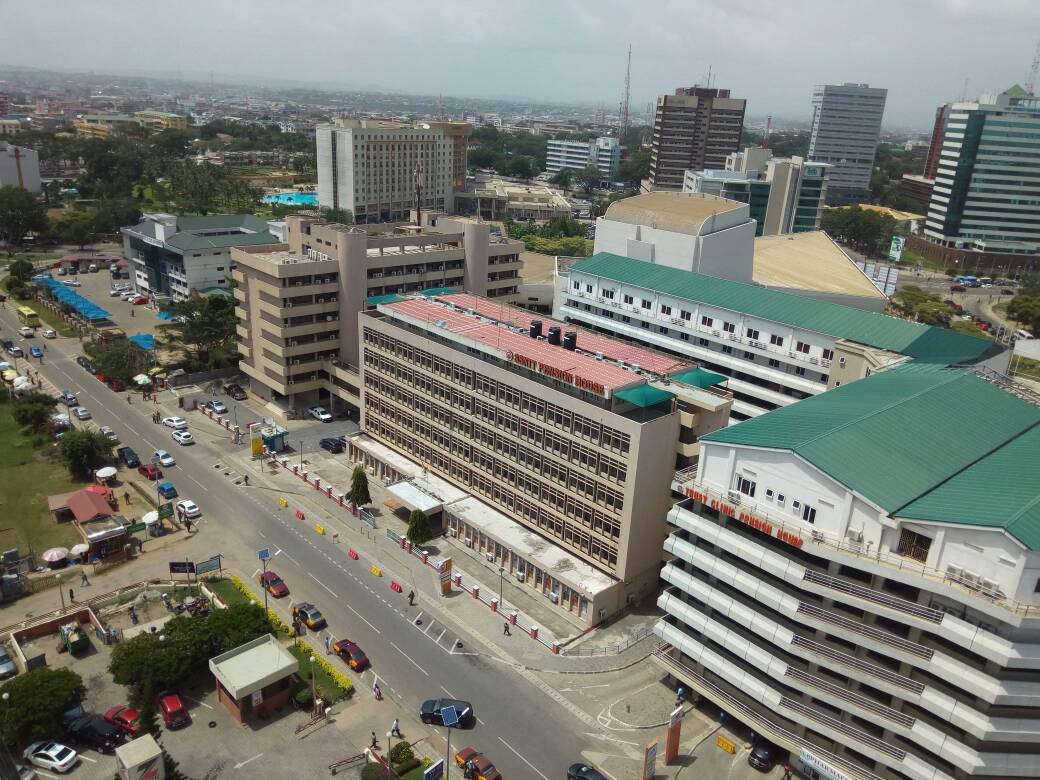
- Aerial View of Accra

- Flag

- Location of Greater Accra Region in Ghana
- Country: Ghana
- Capital: Accra
- Districts: 29

Government
  - Regional Minister: Linda Obenewaa Akweley Ocloo
  - Mayor: Mohammed Adjei Sowah

Area
  - Total: 3,245 km^{2} (1,253 sq mi)
  - Rank: Ranked 10th

Population (2021 Census)
  - Total: 5,455,692
  - Rank: Ranked 2nd
  - Density: 1,681/km^{2} (4,354/sq mi)

GDP (PPP)
  - Year: 2013
  - Per capita: $5,150

GDP (Nominal)
  - Year: 2013
  - Per capita: $2,500
- Time zone: GMT
- Area code: 030
- ISO 3166 code: GH-AA
- HDI (2021): ▲0.707 high · 1st

The Greater Accra Region has the smallest area of Ghana's 16 administrative regions, occupying a total land surface of 3,245 square kilometres. This is 1.4% of the total land area of Ghana. It is the most populated region, with a population of 5,455,692 in 2021, accounting for 17.7% of Ghana's total population. The Greater Accra region is the most urbanized region in the country, with 87.4% of its total population living in urban centres.

The Greater Accra Region is bordered on the north by the Eastern Region, on the east by the Volta Region, on the south by the Gulf of Guinea, and on the west by the Central Region. It is made up of 29 administrative areas. In 1960, Greater Accra, then referred to as Accra Capital District, was geographically part of the Eastern Region. It was administered separately by the Minister responsible for local government. With effect from 23 July 1982, Greater Accra was created by the Greater Accra Region Law (PNDCL 26) as a legally separate region.

== Governance ==
Districts of the Greater Accra Region

The political administration of the region is through the local government system. Under this administration system, the region is divided into 29 MMDA's (made up of 2 Metropolitan, 23 Municipal and 4 Ordinary Assemblies). Each District, Municipal or Metropolitan Area and it's corresponding constituency, is administered by a Chief Executive and a Member of Parliament, representing the central government but deriving authority from an Assembly headed by a presiding member elected from among the members themselves. The MMDA's were increased from 3 to 5 in 1988; then from 5 to 6 in 2004; then from 6 to 10 in 2008; then from 10 to 16 in 2012; and recently from 16 to 29 in 2018. The number of constituencies increased/spread from 22 to 27 in 2004 making and 34 prior to the 2012 Ghanaian general election. The list is as follows:

District	Capital	Constituency	Member of Parliament	Party
Ablekuma Central Municipal	Lartebiokorshie	Ablekuma Central	Dan Abdul-latif	NDC
Ablekuma North Municipal	Darkuman	Ablekuma North	Sheila Bartels	NPP
Ablekuma West Municipal	Dansoman	Ablekuma West	Ursula G Owusu	NPP
Accra Metropolitan	Accra	Ablekuma South	Alfred Okoe Vanderpuije	NDC
Accra Metropolitan	Accra	Odododiodio	Edwin Nii Lante Vanderpuye	NDC
Accra Metropolitan	Accra	Okaikwei Central	Patrick Yaw Boamah	NPP
Accra Metropolitan	Accra	Okaikwei South	Dakoa Newman	NPP
Ada East	Ada Foah	Ada	Comfort Doyoe Cudjoe-Ghansah	NDC
Ada West	Sege	Sege	Christian Corleytey Otuteye	NDC
Adenta Municipal	Adenta	Adenta	Mohammed Adamu Ramadan	NDC
Ashaiman Municipal	Ashaiman	Ashaiman	Ernest Henry Norgbey	NDC
Ayawaso Central Municipal	Kokomlemle	Ayawaso Central	Henry Quartey	NPP
Ayawaso East Municipal	Nima	Ayawaso East	Naser Toure Mahama	NDC
Ayawaso North Municipal	Accra New Town	Ayawaso North	Yussif Issaka Jajah	NDC
Ayawaso West Municipal	Dzorwulu	Ayawaso West	Lydia Alhassan	NPP
Ga Central Municipal	Sowutuom	Anyaa-Sowutuom	Dickson Adomako Kissi	NPP
Ga East Municipal	Abokobi	Dome-Kwabenya	Sarah Adwoa Safo	NPP
Ga North Municipal	Amomole	Trobu	Moses Anim	NPP
Ga South Municipal	Ngleshie Amanfro	Bortianor-Ngleshie-Amanfrom	Sylvester Tetteh	NPP
Ga South Municipal	Ngleshie Amanfro	Domeabra-Obom	Sophia Karen Edem Ackuaku	NDC
Ga West Municipal	Amasaman	Amasaman	Akwasi Owusu Afrifa-Mensah	NPP
Korle Klottey Municipal	Osu	Korle Klottey	Zanetor Agyeman-Rawlings	NDC
Kpone Katamanso Municipal	Kpone	Kpone-Katamanso	Joseph Akuerteh	NDC
Krowor Municipal	Nungua	Krowor	Agnes Naa Momo Lartey	NDC
La Dade Kotopon Municipal	La	Dade Kotopon	Rita Naa Odoley Sowah	NDC
La Nkwantanang Madina Municipal	Madina	Abokobi-Madina	Francis-Xavier Kojo Sosu	NDC
Ledzokuku Municipal	Teshie	Ledzokuku	Benjamin Ayiku Nartey	NDC
Ningo Prampram	Prampram	Ningo-Prampram	Samuel George Nartey	NDC
Okaikwei North Municipal	Achimota	Okaikwei North	Theresa Lardi Awuni	NDC
Shai Osudoku	Dodowa	Shai-Osudoku	Linda Obenewaa Akweley Ocloo	NDC
Tema Metropolitan	Tema	Tema Central	Yves Hanson-Nortey	NPP
Tema Metropolitan	Tema	Tema East	Isaac Ashai Odamtten	NDC
Tema West Municipal	Tema Community 18	Tema West	Carlos Kingsley Ahenkora	NPP
Weija Gbawe Municipal	Weija	Weija	Tina Gifty Naa Ayeley Mensah	NPP

== Demographics ==
=== Population ===
The center of population of the Greater Accra region is located in the Greater Accra Metropolitan Area which comprises the Accra Metropolitan, Tema Metropolitan, Adenta Municipal, La Nkwantanang Madina Municipal District, Ashaiman Municipal, Ledzokuku-Krowor Municipal, Ga East Municipal, Ga West Municipal, and Ga South Municipal districts

According to the 2010 census, the region had a population of 4,010,054, making it the second most populous (total number of people) region of Ghana behind the Ashanti Region.

Historical population
Year	Pop.	±%
1984	1,431,099	—
2000	2,905,726	+103.0%
2010	4,010,054	+38.0%
2021	5,455,692	+36.1%

The Ga sub-group of the Ga-Dangme people is the historical population of Accra. They form the largest ethnic sub-group in the Greater Accra Region, with 18.9% of the population. The Ga peoples were organized into six independent towns (Accra (Ga Mashie), Osu, La, Teshie, Nungua, and Tema). Each town had a stool, which served as the central object of Ga ritual and war magic. The town of La has a community bank which offers banking services to them.

The largest portion of the population of Accra is Akan, at 39.8% of the population. The next largest group is Ga-Dangme at 29.7% of the population. After this 18% of the population is Ewe.

In 1960 the population of the Greater Accra Region was 491,817. In 2000 the population was 2,905,726. In 2010 the population was 4,010,054.

=== Religion ===
The religious affiliations of the people of the Greater Accra region are below:

- Christian – 77.8%
- Muslim –16.2%
- Other Religions – 4.6%
- Traditional – 1.4%

== Transportation ==
The Greater Accra region is served by the Accra International Airport in Accra. The airport offers flight to destinations within Ghana, the African continent and to other continents.

There is an active railway line connecting Accra and Tema.

== Festivals ==
The Ga people celebrate the Homowo festival, which literally means "hooting at hunger." This festival originated several centuries ago. It is celebrated in remembrance of a famine that hit the Ga people in the 16th century. It is mainly a food festival which celebrates the passing of that period in Ga history. It takes place in August every year and is celebrated by all the Ga clans.

The Adangbe people from Ada celebrate the Asafotu festival, which is also called 'Asafotufiam', an annual warrior's festival celebrated by Ada people from the last Thursday of July to the first weekend of August commemorates the victories of the warriors in battle and is a memorial for those who fell on the battlefield. To re-enact these historic events, the warriors dress in traditional battle dress and stage a mock battle. This is also a time for male rites of passage, when men are introduced to warfare. The festival also coincides with the harvest cycle, when these customs and ceremonies are performed. These include purification ceremonies. The celebration reaches its climax with a durbar of chiefs, a colourful procession of the Chiefs in palanquins with their retinue. They are accompanied by traditional military groups called 'Asafo Companies' amidst drumming, singing and dancing through the streets and on the durbar grounds. At the durbar, greetings are exchanged between the chiefs, libations are poured and declarations of allegiance are made.
