= List of parliamentary constituencies of Ghana =

This is a list of the 276 constituencies in Ghana that will be contested in the Parliament of the Republic of Ghana from December 2024. There were 275 constituencies at the time of the 2020 Ghanaian general election. One more constituency, Guan, was added in 2023 and was contested for the first time in the 2024 Ghanaian general election. The number of constituencies has increased from 260 at the previous election held in December 2012 parliamentary election. Each constituency is represented by a single member of parliament (MP). There were 230 parliamentary constituencies previously.

== History ==
At the time Ghana became an independent country, there were 104 seats in parliament. This increased to 198 after 1965, when Ghana became a one-party state. With the start of the Second Republic in 1969, the number of seats was increased to 140. This did not change further until the start of the Fourth Republic when it was increased from 140 to 200. Following the December 2000 election, the number of seats was increased. After the 2000 population census, the number of districts increased from 110 to 138. Subsequently, the Electoral Commission of Ghana conducted a demarcation exercise which increased the number of constituencies from 200 to 230. The total list of constituencies was increased to 275 before the 2012 Ghanaian general election. This was done by the Electoral Commission of Ghana after the final results of the 2010 population census became available. Additionally, after referendum in December 2018, the number of administrative regions has also been increased from ten to sixteen.

== Constituencies per region ==
Constituencies per region
Region	Number of constituencies
Ahafo	6
Ashanti	47
Bono	12
Bono East	11
Central	23
Eastern	33
Greater Accra	34
North East	6
Northern	18
Oti	9
Savannah	7
Upper East	15
Upper West	11
Volta	18
Western	17
Western North	9

== Ahafo Region ==
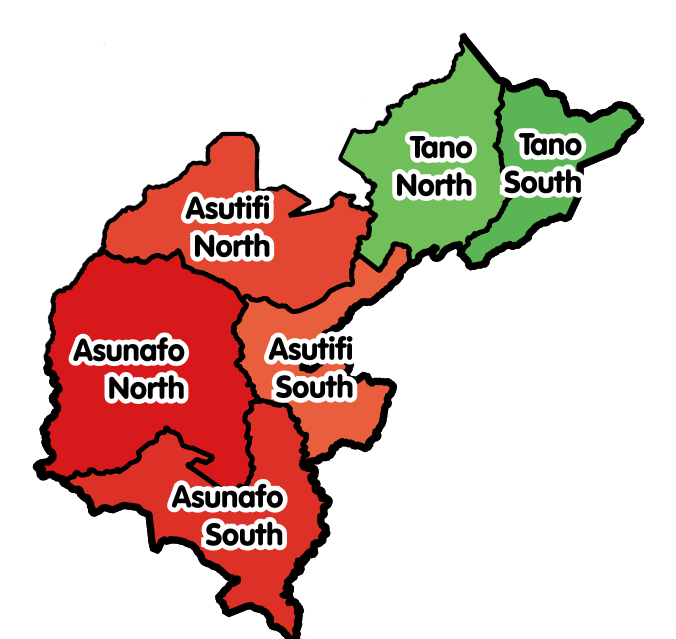
Districts of the Ahafo Region

The Ahafo Region is one of the two new regions carved out of the Brong-Ahafo Region, which was divided into three regions following the December 2018 referendum.

District	Capital	Constituency
Asunafo North Municipal	Goaso	Asunafo North
Asunafo South	Kukuom	Asunafo South
Asutifi North	Kenyasi	Asutifi North
Asutifi South	Hwidiem	Asutifi South
Tano North Municipal	Duayaw Nkwanta	Tano North
Tano South Municipal	Bechem	Tano South

== Ashanti Region ==
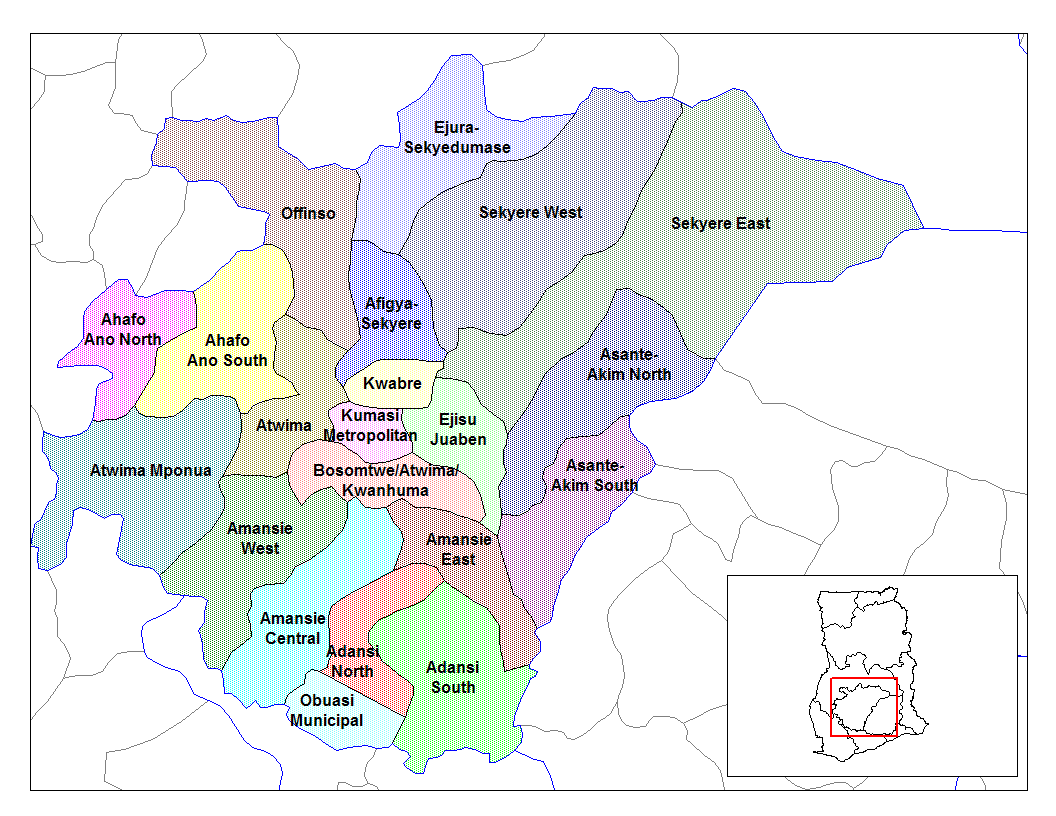
Districts of Ashanti

The number of constituencies in this region increased from 33 to 39 in 2004 and to 48 in 2012 before the 2012 Ghanaian general election. Some new districts were created in 2008, affecting the location of certain constituencies.

District	Capital	Constituency	Comments
Adansi Asokwa	Adansi Asokwa	Adansi-Asokwa	
Adansi North	Fomena	Fomena	
Adansi South	New Edubiase	New Edubease	
Afigya Kwabre North	Boamang	Afigya Kwabre North	
Afigya Kwabre South	Kodie	Afigya Kwabre South	
Ahafo Ano North Municipal	Tepa	Ahafo Ano North	
Ahafo Ano South East	Dwinyame / Adugyama	Ahafo Ano South East	Created 2012
Ahafo Ano South West	Mankranso	Ahafo Ano South West	
Akrofuom	Akrofuom	Akrofuom	Created 2004
Amansie Central	Jacobu	Odotobri	
Amansie West	Manso Nkwanta	Manso Nkwanta	
Amansie South	Manso Adubia	Manso Edubia	Created 2012
Asante Akim Central Municipal	Konongo	Asante Akim Central	
Asante Akim North	Agogo	Asante Akim North	Created 2012
Asante Akim South Municipal	Juaso	Asante Akim South	
Asokore Mampong	Asokore Mampong	Asawase	Created 2004
Asokwa Municipal	Asokwa	Asokwa	
Atwima Kwanwoma	Twedie	Atwima-Kwanwoma	
Atwima Mponua	Nyinahin	Atwima Mponua	
Atwima Nwabiagya Municipal	Nkawie	Atwima-Nwabiagya South	
Atwima Nwabiagya North	Barekese	Atwima-Nwabiagya North	Created 2012
Bekwai Municipal	Bekwai	Bekwai	
Bosome Freho	Asiwa	Bosome-Freho	
Bosomtwe	Kuntanse	Bosomtwe	
Ejisu Municipal	Ejisu	Ejisu	
Ejura Sekyedumase Municipal	Ejura	Ejura-Sekyedumase	
Juaben Municipal	Juaben	Juaben	Created 2012
Kumasi Metropolitan	Kumasi	Bantama	
Kumasi Metropolitan	Kumasi	Manhyia North	Created 2012
Kumasi Metropolitan	Kumasi	Manhyia South	
Kumasi Metropolitan	Kumasi	Nhyiaeso	Created 2004
Kumasi Metropolitan	Kumasi	Subin	
Kwabre East Municipal	Mamponteng	Kwabre East	
Kwadaso Municipal	Kwadaso	Kwadaso	Created 2004
Mampong Municipal	Mampong	Mampong	
Obuasi East Municipal	Tutuka	Obuasi East	Created 2012
Obuasi Municipal	Obuasi	Obuasi West	
Offinso Municipal	Offinso	Offinso South	
Offinso North	Akomadan	Offinso North	
Oforikrom Municipal	Oforikrom	Oforikrom	
Old Tafo Municipal	Old Tafo	Old Tafo	Created 2004
Sekyere Afram Plains	Drobonso	Sekyere Afram Plains	Created 2012
Sekyere Central	Nsuta	Nsuta-Kwamang-Beposo	
Sekyere East	Effiduase	Afigya Sekyere East	
Sekyere Kumawu	Kumawu	Kumawu	
Sekyere South	Agona	Effiduase-Asokore	
Suame Municipal	Suame	Suame	Created 2004

== Bono Region ==
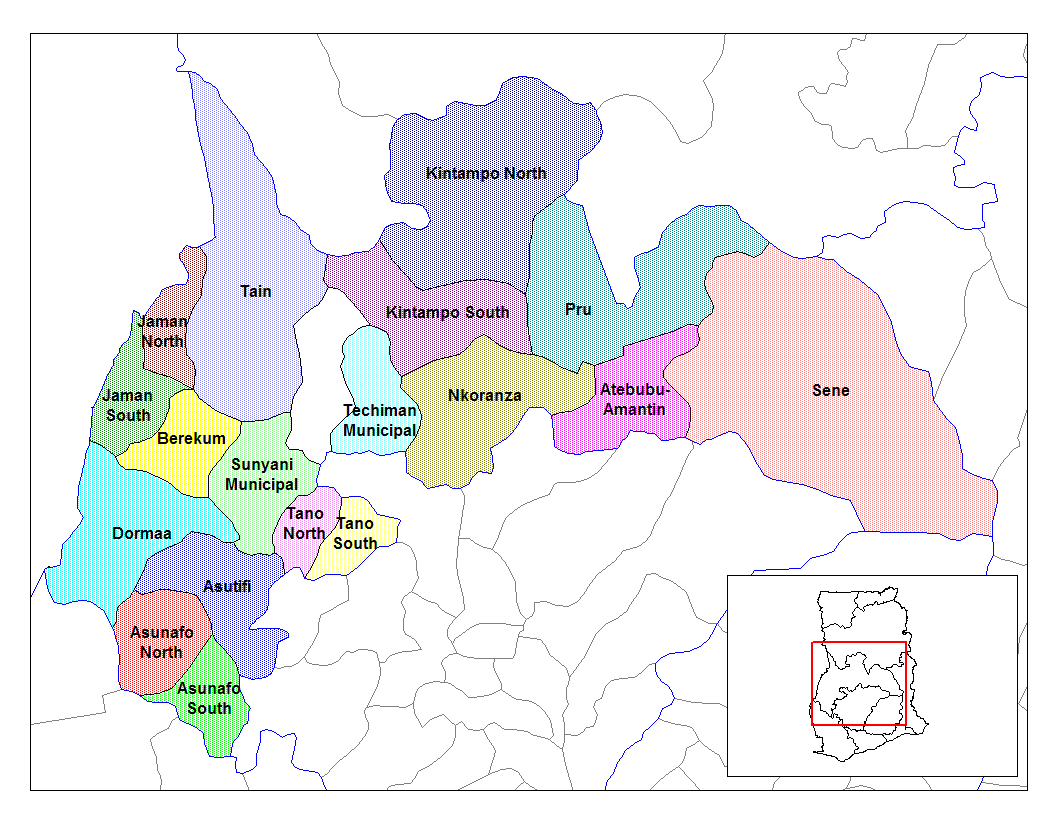
Districts of Brong Ahafo

The Brong-Ahafo Region was split into three regions following the December 2018 referendum.

District	Capital	Constituency	Comments
Banda	Banda Ahenkro	Banda Ahenkro	Created 2012
Berekum East Municipal	Berekum	Berekum East	
Berekum West	Jinijini	Berekum West	Created 2012
Dormaa Central Municipal	Dormaa Ahenkro	Dormaa Central	
Dormaa East District	Wamfie	Dormaa East	
Dormaa West	Nkrankwanta	Dormaa West	Created 2012
Jaman North	Sampa	Jaman North	Created 2004
Jaman South Municipal	Drobo	Jaman South	
Sunyani Municipal	Sunyani	Sunyani East	
Sunyani West	Odumase	Sunyani West	
Tain	Nsawkaw	Tain	Created 2004
Wenchi Municipal	Wenchi	Wenchi	Created 2004

== Bono East Region ==
The Bono East Region is one of the two new regions carved out of the Brong Ahafo Region. The Brong-Ahafo Region was divided into three regions following the December 2018 referendum.

District	Capital	Constituency	Comments
Atebubu-Amantin Municipal	Atebubu	Atebubu-Amantin	Created 2004
Kintampo North Municipal	Kintampo	Kintampo North	Created 2004
Kintampo South	Jema	Kintampo South	
Nkoranza North	Busunya	Nkoranza North	Created 2004
Nkoranza South Municipal	Nkoranza	Nkoranza South	
Pru East	Yeji	Pru East	Pru created 2004; Pru split 2012
Pru West	Prang	Pru West	Created 2012
Sene East	Kajaji	Sene East	Created 2012
Sene West	Kwame Danso	Sene West	
Techiman Municipal	Techiman	Techiman South	
Techiman North	Tuobodom	Techiman North	

== Central Region ==
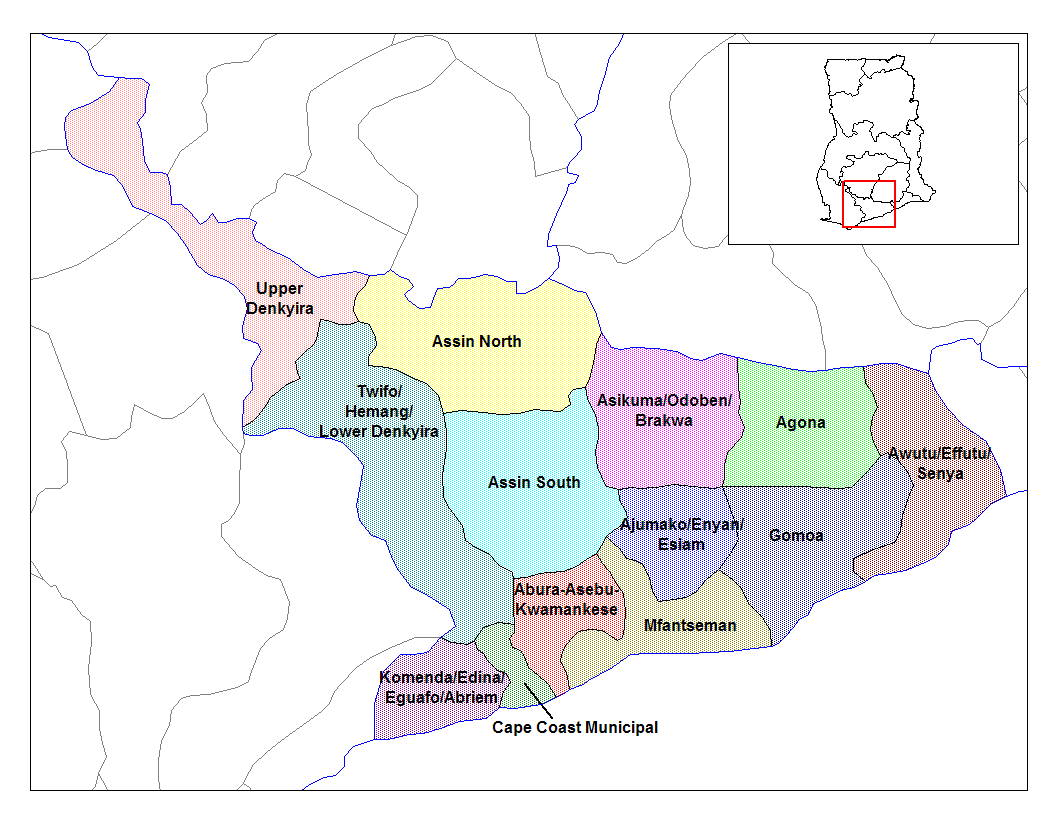
Districts of Central Ghana

The number of constituencies in the region increased from 17 to 19 in 2004 and to 23 in 2012 before the 2012 Ghanaian general election.

District	Capital	Constituency	Comments
Abura Asebu Kwamankese	Abura-Dunkwa	Abura-Asebu-Kwamankese	
Agona East	Nsaba	Agona East	
Agona West Municipal	Agona Swedru	Agona West	
Ajumako Enyan Essiam	Ajumako	Ajumako-Enyan-Essiam	
Asikuma Odoben Brakwa	Breman Asikuma	Asikuma-Odoben-Brakwa	
Assin Central Municipal	Assin Foso	Assin Central	Created 2012
Assin North	Assin Bereku	Assin North	
Assin South	Nsuaem Kyekyewere	Assin South	
Awutu Senya East Municipal	Kasoa	Awutu-Senya East	Created 2012
Awutu Senya West	Awutu Breku	Awutu-Senya West	
Cape Coast Metropolitan	Cape Coast	Cape Coast North	Created 2012
Cape Coast Metropolitan	Cape Coast	Cape Coast South	
Effutu Municipal	Winneba	Effutu	
Ekumfi	Apam	Ekumfi	
Gomoa East	Potsin	Gomoa East	
Gomoa Central	Afransi	Gomoa Central	Created 2012
Gomoa West	Esakyir	Gomoa West	
Komenda-Edina-Eguafo-Abirem Municipal	Elmina	Komenda-Edina-Eguafo-Abirem	
Mfantsiman Municipal	Saltpond	Mfantseman	
Twifo Atti Morkwa	Twifo Praso	Twifo-Atii Morkwaa	
Twifo/Heman/Lower Denkyira	Hemang	Hemang Lower Denkyira	Created 2004
Upper Denkyira East Municipal	Dunkwa-on-Offin	Upper Denkyira East	Created 2004
Upper Denkyira West	Diaso	Upper Denkyira West	Created 2004

== Eastern Region ==
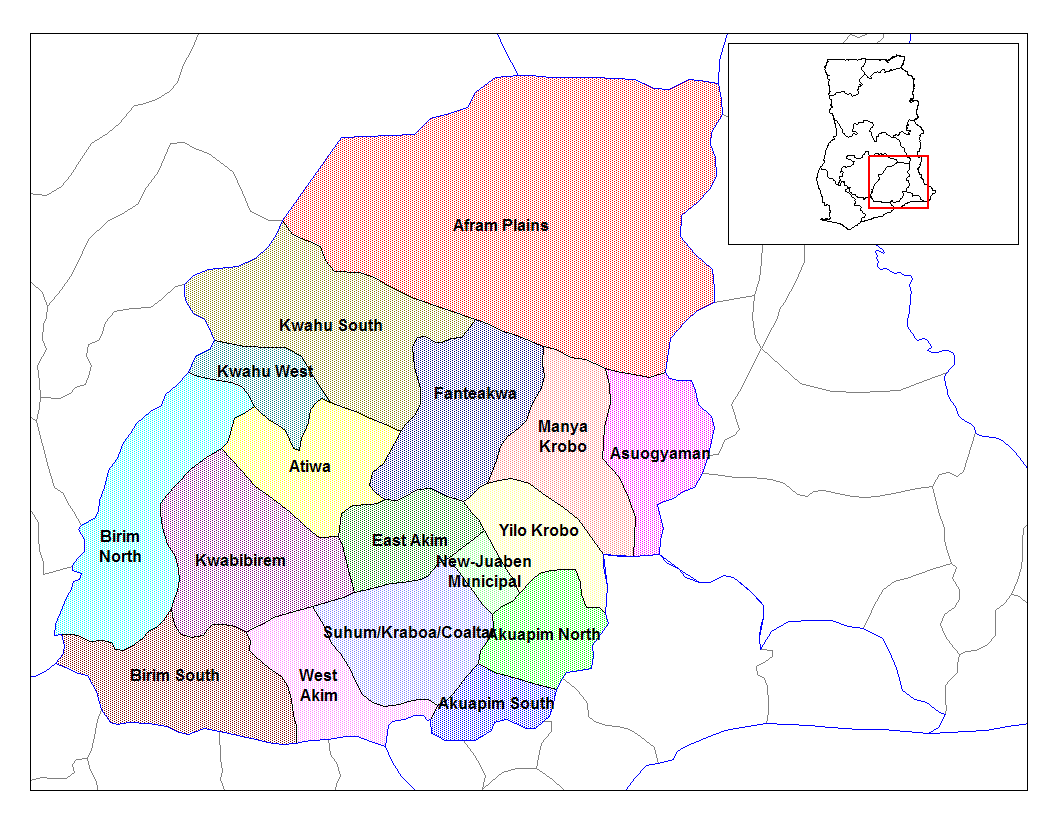
Districts of Eastern Ghana

The number of constituencies was increased from 26 to 28 in 2004 and to 33 in 2012 before the 2012 Ghanaian general election.

District	Capital	Constituency	Comments
Abuakwa North Municipal	Kukurantumi	Abuakwa North	Created 2004
Abuakwa South Municipal	Kibi	Abuakwa South	Created 2004
Achiase	Achiase	Achiase	Created 2012
Akuapim North Municipal	Akropong	Akropong	
Akuapim South	Aburi	Akwapim South	Created 2012
Akyemansa	Ofoase	Ofoase-Ayirebi	Created 2004
Asene Manso Akroso	Manso	Asene Akroso Manso	Created 2012
Asuogyaman	Atimpoku	Asuogyaman	
Atiwa East	Anyinam	Atiwa East	Created 2012
Atiwa West	Kwabeng	Atiwa West	
Ayensuano	Coaltar	Ayensuano	
Birim Central Municipal	Akim Oda	Akim Oda	
Birim North	New Abirem	Abirem	
Birim South	Akim Swedru	Akim Swedru	
Denkyembour	Akwatia	Akwatia	
Fanteakwa North	Begoro	Fanteakwa North	
Fanteakwa South	Osino	Fanteakwa South	Created 2012
Kwaebibirem Municipal	Kade	Kade	
Kwahu Afram Plains North	Donkorkrom	Afram Plains North	
Kwahu Afram Plains South	Tease, Ghana	Afram Plains South	
Kwahu East	Abetifi	Abetifi	
Kwahu South	Mpraeso	Mpraeso	
Kwahu West Municipal	Nkawkaw	Nkawkaw	
Lower Manya Krobo Municipal	Krobo Odumase	Lower Manya	
New Juaben North Municipal	Effiduase	New Juaben North	
New Juaben South Municipal	Koforidua	New Juaben South	Created 2004
Nsawam Adoagyire Municipal	Nsawam	Nsawam Adoagyiri	
Okere	Adukrom	Okere	
Suhum Municipal District	Suhum	Suhum	
Upper Manya Krobo	Asesewa	Upper Manya	
Upper West Akim	Adeiso	Upper West Akim	
West Akim Municipal	Asamankese	Lower West Akim	
Yilo Krobo Municipal	Somanya	Yilo Krobo	

== Greater Accra Region ==
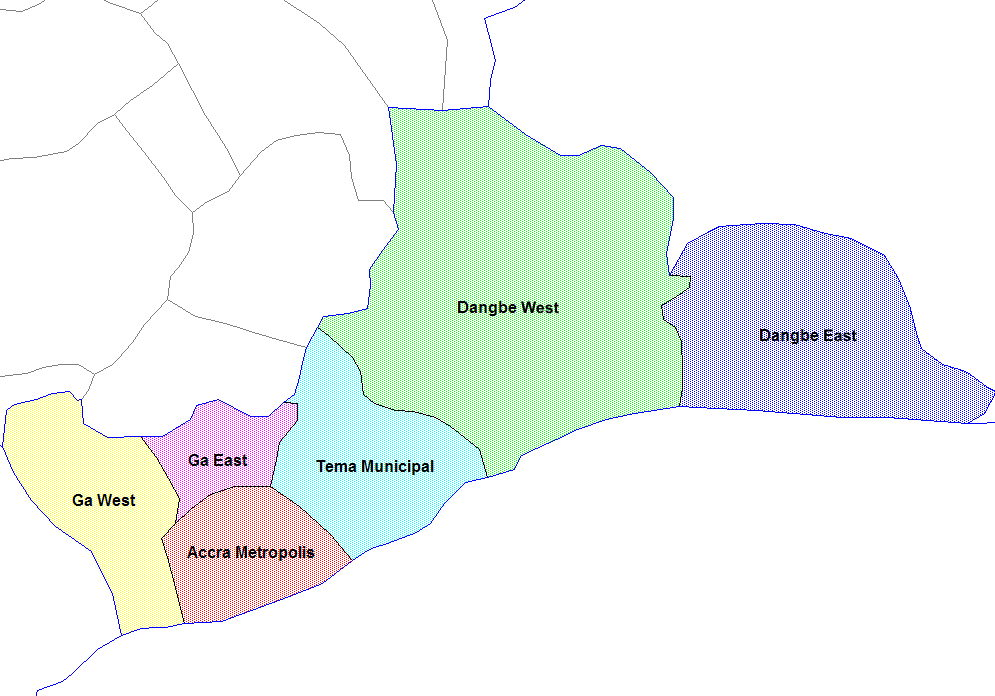
Districts of Greater Accra

The number of constituencies increased/spread from 22 to 27 in 2004 and to 34 before the 2012 Ghanaian general election.

District	Capital	Constituency	Comments
Ablekuma Central Municipal Assembly	Lartebiokorshie	Ablekuma Central	
Ablekuma North Municipal Assembly	Darkuman	Ablekuma North	
Ablekuma West Municipal Assembly	Dansoman	Ablekuma West	Created 2012
Accra Metropolitan Assembly	Accra	Ablekuma South	
Accra Metropolitan Assembly	Accra	Odododiodio	
Accra Metropolitan Assembly	Accra	Okaikwei Central	Created 2012
Accra Metropolitan Assembly	Accra	Okaikwei South	
Ada East	Ada Foah	Ada	
Ada West	Sege	Sege	Created 2004
Adenta Municipal	Adenta	Adenta	Created 2004
Ashaiman Municipal	Ashaiman	Ashaiman	
Ayawaso Central Municipal	Kokomlemle	Ayawaso Central	
Ayawaso East Municipal Assembly	Nima	Ayawaso East	
Ayawaso North Municipal Assembly	Accra New Town	Ayawaso North	Created 2012
Ayawaso West Wuogon Municipal Assembly	Dzorwulu	Ayawaso West	
Ga Central Municipal	Sowutuom	Anyaa-Sowutuom	Created 2012
Ga East Municipal	Abokobi	Dome-Kwabenya	Created 2004
Ga North Municipal	Amomole	Trobu	Created from Trobu-Amasaman 2012
Ga South Municipal	Ngleshie Amanfro	Bortianor-Ngleshie-Amanfrom	Created 2012
Ga South Municipal	Ngleshie Amanfro	Domeabra-Obom	Created 2004
Ga West Municipal	Amasaman	Amasaman	Trobu-Amasaman 2004; Split 2012
Korle-Klottey Municipal Assembly	Osu	Korle Klottey	
Kpone Katamanso Municipal Assembly	Kpone	Kpone-Katamanso	
Krowor Municipal Assembly	Nungua	Krowor	
La Dade Kotopon Municipal Assembly	La	Dade Kotopon	
La Nkwantanang Madina Municipal	Madina	Abokobi-Madina	Created 2004
Ledzokuku Municipal	Teshie	Ledzokuku	
Ningo Prampram	Prampram	Ningo-Prampram	
Okaikwei North Municipal	Tesano	Okaikwei North	
Shai Osudoku	Dodowa	Shai-Osudoku	
Tema Metropolitan Assembly	Tema	Tema Central	Created 2012
Tema Metropolitan Assembly	Tema	Tema East	
Tema West Municipal	Tema Community 18	Tema West	
Weija Gbawe Municipal Assembly	Weija	Weija	Created 2004

== North East Region ==
The Northeast Region was created following the December 2018 referendum.

District	Capital	Constituency	Comments
Bunkpurugu Nyankpanduri	Bunkpurugu	Bunkpurugu	
Chereponi	Chereponi	Chereponi	
East Mamprusi Municipal	Nalerigu	Nalerigu	
Mamprugu Moagduri	Yagaba	Yagaba-Kubori	Created 2004
West Mamprusi Municipal	Walewale	Walewale	Created 2004
Yunyoo-Nasuan	Yunyoo	Yunyoo	Created 2012

== Northern Region ==
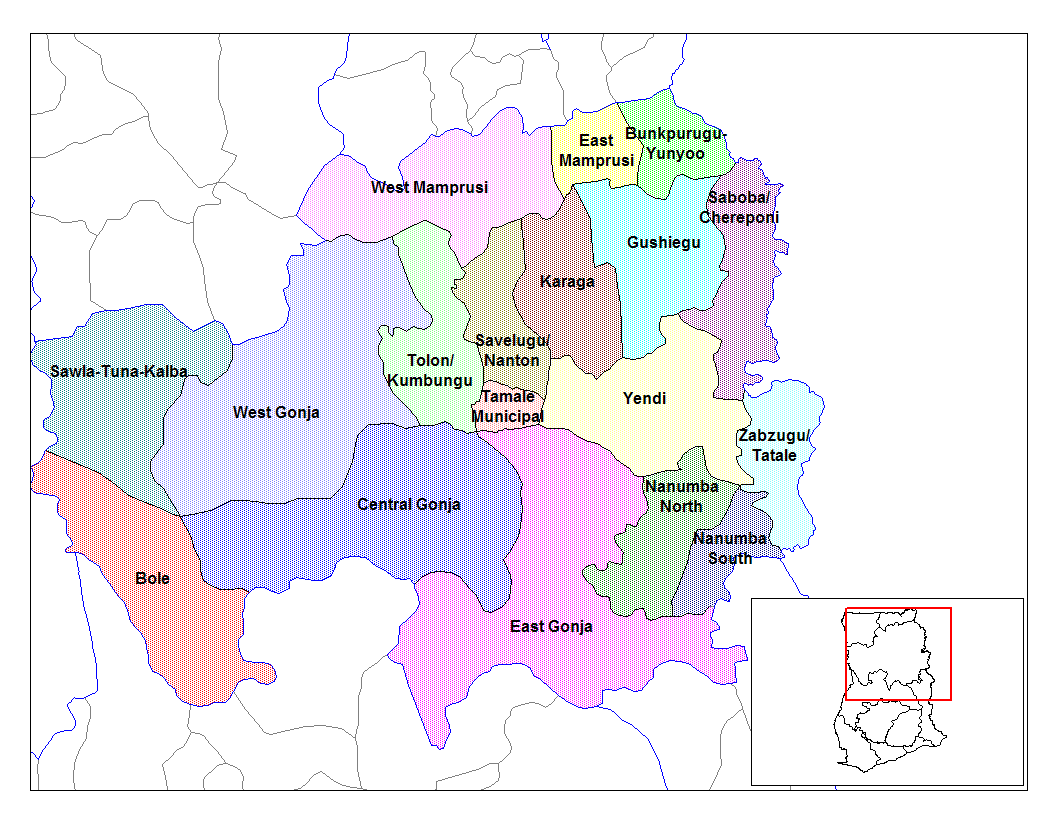
Districts of Northern Ghana

The number of constituencies increased from 23 to 26 in 2004 and to 31 in 2012 before the 2012 Ghanaian general election. After the division of the region into Northern and Northeastern regions, the region now has 18 constituencies.

District	Capital	Constituency	Comments
Gushegu Municipal	Gushegu	Gushegu	
Karaga	Karaga	Karaga	Created 2004
Kpandai	Kpandai	Kpandai	
Kumbungu	Kumbungu	Kumbungu	
Mion	Sang	Mion	
Nanton	Nanton	Nanton	
Nanumba North Municipal	Bimbilla	Bimbilla	
Nanumba South	Wulensi	Wulensi	
Saboba	Saboba	Saboba	
Sagnarigu Municipal	Sagnarigu	Sagnarigu	Created 2004
Savelugu Municipal	Savelugu	Savelugu	
Tamale Metropolitan	Tamale	Tamale Central	Created 2004
Tamale Metropolitan	Tamale	Tamale North	
Tamale Metropolitan	Tamale	Tamale South	Created 2004
Tatale Sanguli	Tatale	Tatale-Sanguli	Created 2012
Tolon	Tolon	Tolon	
Yendi Municipal	Yendi	Yendi	
Zabzugu	Zabzugu	Zabzugu	

== Oti Region ==
The Oti Region was created following the December 2018 referendum. There were 8 seats originally, but Guan was added before the 2024 general election.

District	Capital	Constituency	Comments
Biakoye	Nkonya Ahenkro	Biakoye	
Guan District	Likpe-Mate	Guan	created 2020
Jasikan	Jasikan	Buem	
Kadjebi	Kadjebi	Akan	
Krachi East Municipal	Dambai	Krachi East	Created 2004
Krachi Nchumuru	Chinderi	Krachi Nchumuru	Created 2012
Krachi West	Kete Krachi	Krachi West	Krachi split in 2004
Nkwanta North	Kpassa	Nkwanta North	Created 2004
Nkwanta South Municipal	Nkwanta	Nkwanta South	Split from Nkwanta 2004

== Savannah Region ==
The Savannah Region was created following the December 2018 referendum.

District	Capital	Constituency	Comments
Bole	Bole	Bole	
Central Gonja	Buipe	Yapei-Kusawgu	
East Gonja Municipal	Salaga	Salaga South	
North East Gonja	Kpalbe	Salaga North	Created 2012
North Gonja	Daboya	Daboya-Mankarigu	Created 2012
Sawla-Tuna-Kalba	Sawla	Sawla-Tuna-Kalba	
West Gonja Municipal	Damongo	Damango	

== Upper East Region ==
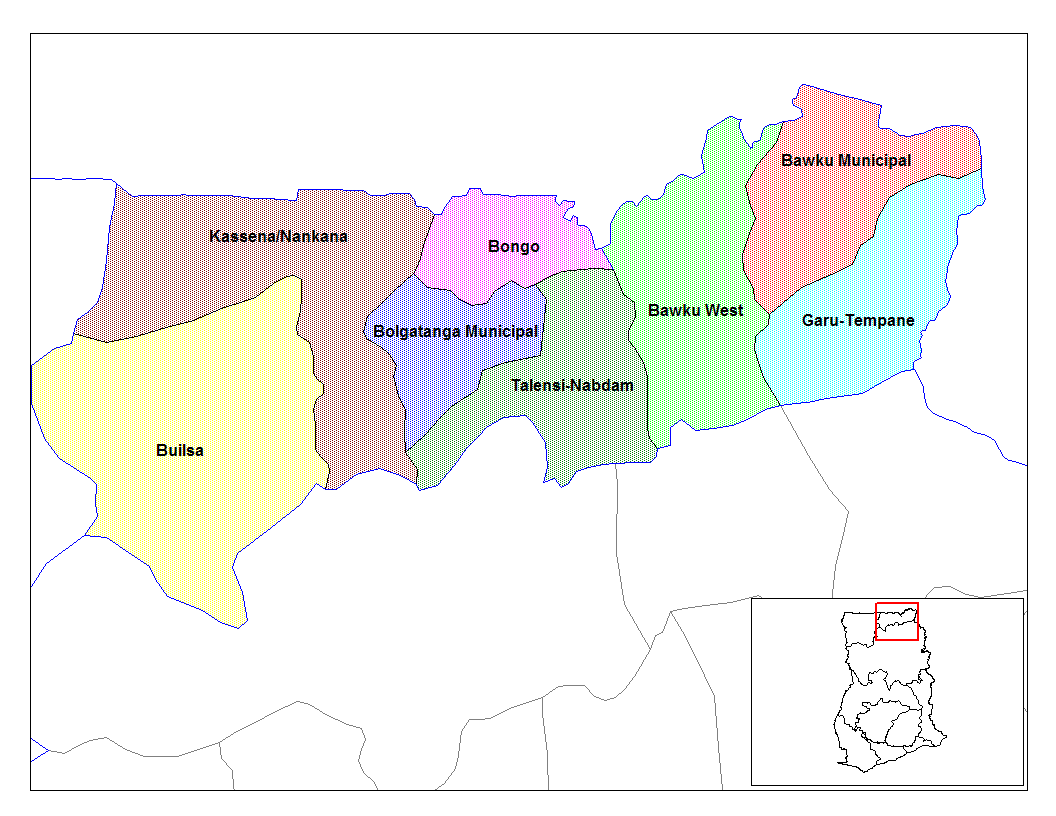
Districts of Upper East Ghana

The number of constituencies increased from 12 to 13 in 2004 and to 15 in 2012 before the 2012 Ghanaian general election.

District	Capital	Constituency	Comments
Bawku Municipal	Bawku	Bawku Central	
Bawku West	Zebilla	Zebilla	Created 2004
Binduri	Binduri	Binduri	
Bolgatanga East	Zuarungu	Bolgatanga East	Created 2012
Bolgatanga Municipal	Bolgatanga	Bolgatanga Central	
Bongo	Bongo	Bongo	
Builsa North Municipal	Sandema	Builsa North	
Builsa South	Fumbisi	Builsa South	
Garu	Garu	Garu	
Kassena Nankana Municipal	Navrongo	Navrongo Central	
Kassena Nankana West	Paga	Chiana-Paga	
Nabdam	Nangodi	Nabdam	
Pusiga	Pusiga	Pusiga	Created 2004
Talensi	Tongo	Talensi	
Tempane	Tempane	Tempane	Created 2012

== Upper West Region ==
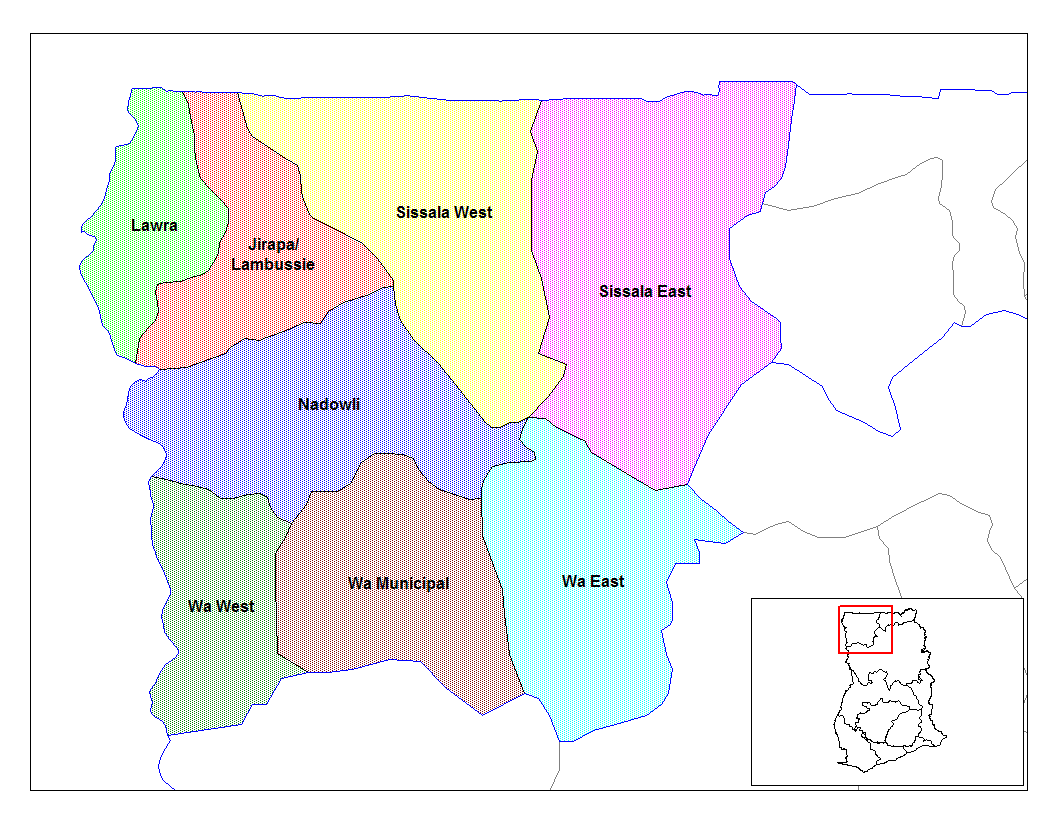
Districts of Upper West Ghana

The number of constituencies increased from 8 to 10 and to 11 in 2012 before the 2012 Ghanaian general election.

District	Capital	Constituency	Comments
Daffiama Bussie Issa	Issa	Daffiama-Bussie-Issa	Renamed from Nadowli East
Jirapa Municipal	Jirapa	Jirapa	
Lambussie Karni	Lambussie	Lambussie	
Lawra Municipal	Lawra	Lawra	
Nadowli-Kaleo	Nadowli	Nadowli Kaleo	Created 2004 as Nadowli West
Nandom Municipal	Nandom	Nandom	Created 2012
Sissala East Municipal	Tumu	Sissala East	Split from Sissala 2004
Sissala West	Gwollu	Sissala West	Split from Sissala 2004
Wa East	Funsi	Wa East	
Wa Municipal	Wa	Wa Central	
Wa West	Wechiau	Wa West	Created 2004

== Volta Region ==
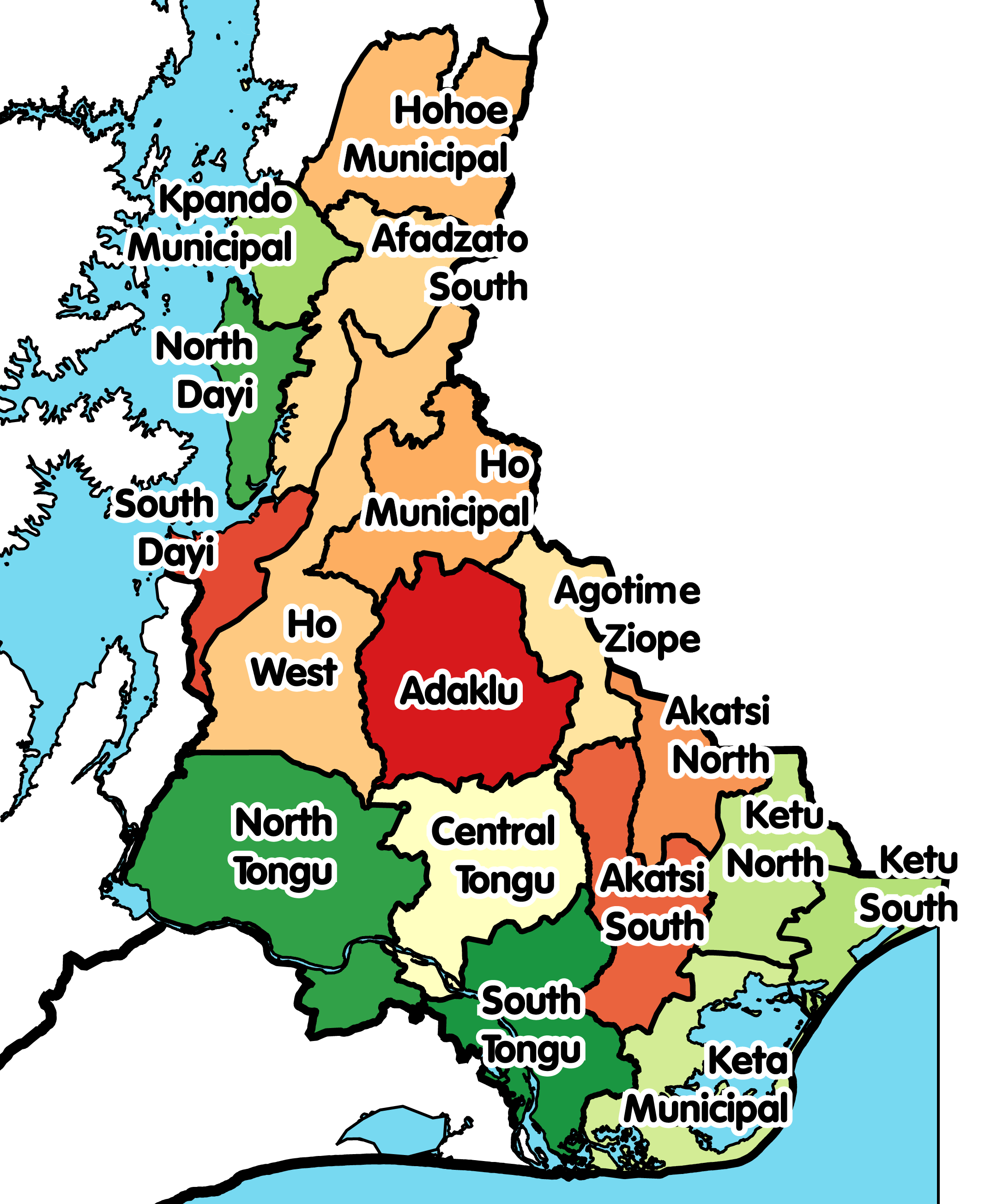
Districts of the Volta Region

The number of constituencies increased from 19 to 22 in 2004 and to 26 in 2012 before the 2012 Ghanaian general election. This was reduced to 18 after the December 2018 referendum which led to the creation of 6 new regions. The old Volta Region was divided into the Oti and Volta Regions.

District	Capital	Constituency	Comments
Adaklu District	Adaklu Waya	Adaklu	Created 2012
Afadzato South	Ve Golokwati	Afadjato South	
Agotime Ziope	Kpetoe	Agotime-Ziope	
Akatsi North	Ave-Dakpa	Akatsi North	Created 2012
Akatsi South	Akatsi	Akatsi South	
Anloga	Anloga	Anlo	
Central Tongu	Adidome	Central Tongu	Created 2004
Ho Municipal	Ho	Ho Central	
Ho West	Dzolokpuita	Ho West	
Hohoe Municipal	Hohoe	Hohoe	
Keta Municipal	Keta	Keta	
Ketu North Municipal	Dzodze	Ketu North	
Ketu South Municipal	Denu	Ketu South	
Kpando Municipal	Kpando	Kpando	
North Dayi	Anfoega	North Dayi	Created 2012
North Tongu	Battor Dugame	North Tongu	
South Dayi	Kpeve	South Dayi	
South Tongu	Sogakope	South Tongu	

== Western Region ==
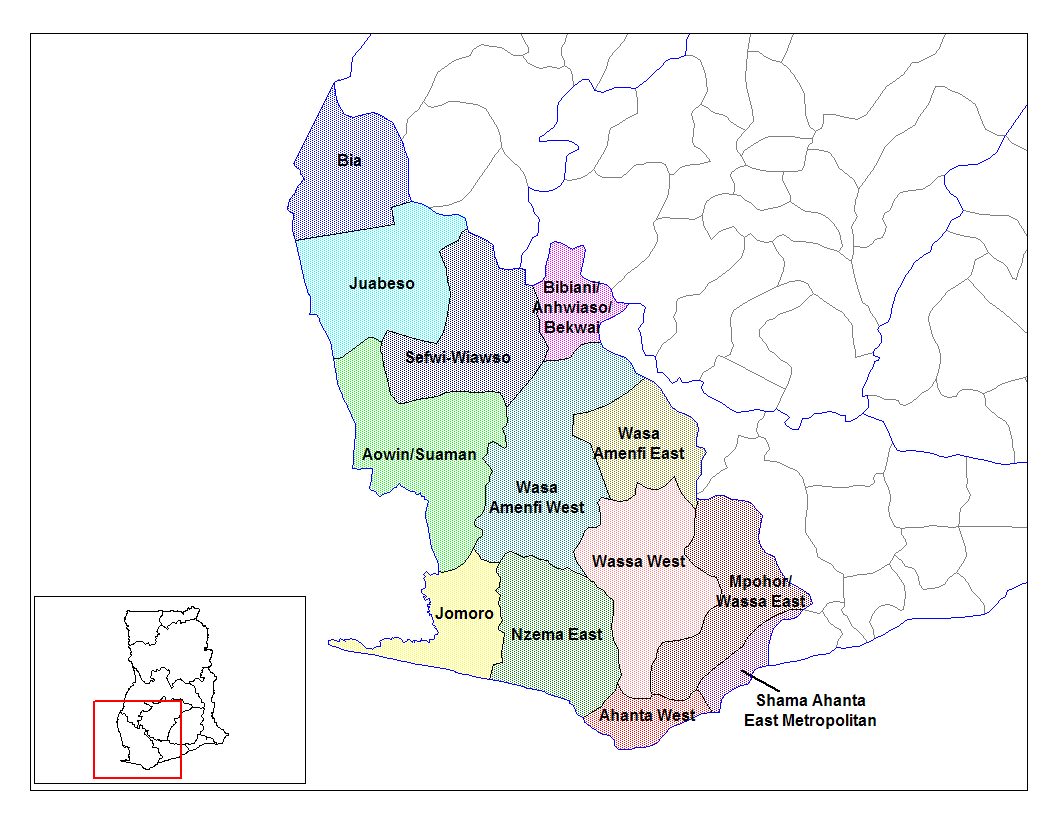
Districts of Western Ghana

The number of constituencies increased from 19 to 22 in 2004 and to 26 in 2012.

District	Capital	Constituency	Comments
Ahanta West Municipal	Agona Ahanta	Ahanta West	
Amenfi Central	Manso	Amenfi Central	
Amenfi West Municipal	Asankragua	Amenfi West	
Effia Kwesimintsim Municipal	Kwesimintsim	Effia	
Effia Kwesimintsim Municipal	Kwesimintsim	Kwesimintsim	Created 2012
Ellembelle	Nkroful	Ellembelle	
Jomoro Municipal	Half Assini	Jomoro	
Mpohor	Mpohor	Mpohor	Created 2012
Nzema East Municipal	Axim	Evalue Gwira Evalue-Gwira	
Prestea-Huni Valley Municipal	Bogoso	Prestea-Huni Valley	Created 2008
Sekondi Takoradi Metropolitan	Sekondi-Takoradi	Essikado-Ketan	Created 2004
Sekondi Takoradi Metropolitan	Sekondi-Takoradi	Sekondi	
Sekondi Takoradi Metropolitan	Sekondi-Takoradi	Takoradi	
Shama	Shama	Shama	
Tarkwa-Nsuaem Municipal	Tarkwa	Tarkwa-Nsuaem	
Wassa Amenfi East Municipal	Wassa-Akropong	Amenfi East	
Wassa East	Daboase	Wassa East	

== Western North Region ==
District	Capital	Constituency	Comments
Aowin Municipal	Enchi	Aowin	Created 2004
Bia East	Adabokrom	Bia East	Created 2012
Bia West	Essam	Bia West	
Bibiani Anhwiaso Bekwai Municipal	Bibiani	Bibiani-Anhwiaso-Bekwai	
Bodi	Bodi	Bodi	Created 2012
Juaboso	Juaboso	Juabeso	
Sefwi Akontombra	Sefwi Akontombra	Sefwi-Akontombra	Created 2004
Sefwi-Wiawso Municipal	Wiawso	Sefwi-Wiawso	
Suaman	Dadieso	Suaman	

== See also ==
- Parliament of Ghana
- Districts of Ghana
- Regions of Ghana
- Administrative divisions of Ghana

== External links and sources ==
- Ghana Parliament official website
- Constituencies and MPs on GhanaDistrict.com
- List of new constituencies by region on Ghana government website
- List of the new constituencies created in 2004 by National Electoral Commission – Page 11
