= Kwawkrom =

Community in Ghana

Coordinates: 6°25′N 2°53′W

Kwawkrom is a community in the Bibiani-Anhwiaso-Bekwai in the Western North Region of Ghana. It is a rain forest reserve situated near the Boin Tano Nature Reserve. It is approximately 20 kilometers southwest of Bibiani.

The community was established in 1957, the year of Ghanaian Independence.

== Facilities ==
The community has 53 homes built.

== Geography ==
The community is surrounded by rain forest and cocoa trees. The Suraw River runs alongside the Eastern side. Three boreholes provide drinking water.

== Economy ==
Business includes one sundries kiosk, a baker and a cocoa shed.

== Religion ==
A Roman Catholic church and a Pentecostal Church are present.

== Governance ==
The community has a Chief and a Queen Mother. The social structure is a Chieftaincy.

== Demographics ==
The population of the community is youthful and has grown in recent history.

Although the average life expectancy in Ghana] has risen in 2016 to 62.4 years (male and female) ranking it 25th in Africa, this community has several octogenarians including the present Chief.

The population is majority Christian.

== Language ==
The local community speaks Sefwi, a dialect Akan/ Twi.

== Culture ==
The community practices funeral rituals. It is not uncommon to see coffins reflecting the dreams, desires or the occupation of the deceased.

== Climate ==
The climate is tropical. The main rainy season runs from April to July with a minor rainy season from September to November. The region generally experiences Harmattan, a dry desert wind from the Sahara from December to March. This wind carries thick dust particles that can interfere with sunshine, cocoa production and transport.

== Economy ==
The economy is based primarily on the production of cocoa beans. The beans are sold to Ghana Cocoa Board through local cooperatives. The forests have been cut back to make way for cocoa farming on an industrial scale.

Local residents practice subsistence farming. They cultivate rice.

== Education ==
=== Primary schools ===
Children attend school at Anyinasie Primary School, 2 kilometers away from the community.

The Ghanaian Environmental Protection Agency (EPA) is building a new Kindergarten and Primary School within the community. Construction was expected to be completed by January 2017.

=== Junior high school ===
The closest Junior High is in Surano.

=== Senior high school ===
Children may attend school in other localities such as Bibiani or Wiawso.

A Public Senior High School is under construction in Chirano, approximately 5 kilometers away.

== Information technology ==
Access to information technology is limited. Connection to the electricity grid is now available.

== Health care ==
The local community has access to medical clinics in Etwebo, Chirano and Paboase. Residents can seek medical attention at either the Bibiani District Hospital and or Sefwi Wiawso District Hospital.

Malaria is the number one cause of death.
