= Western Region (Ghana) =

Region of Ghana

Western Region Région du Ouest
- Region
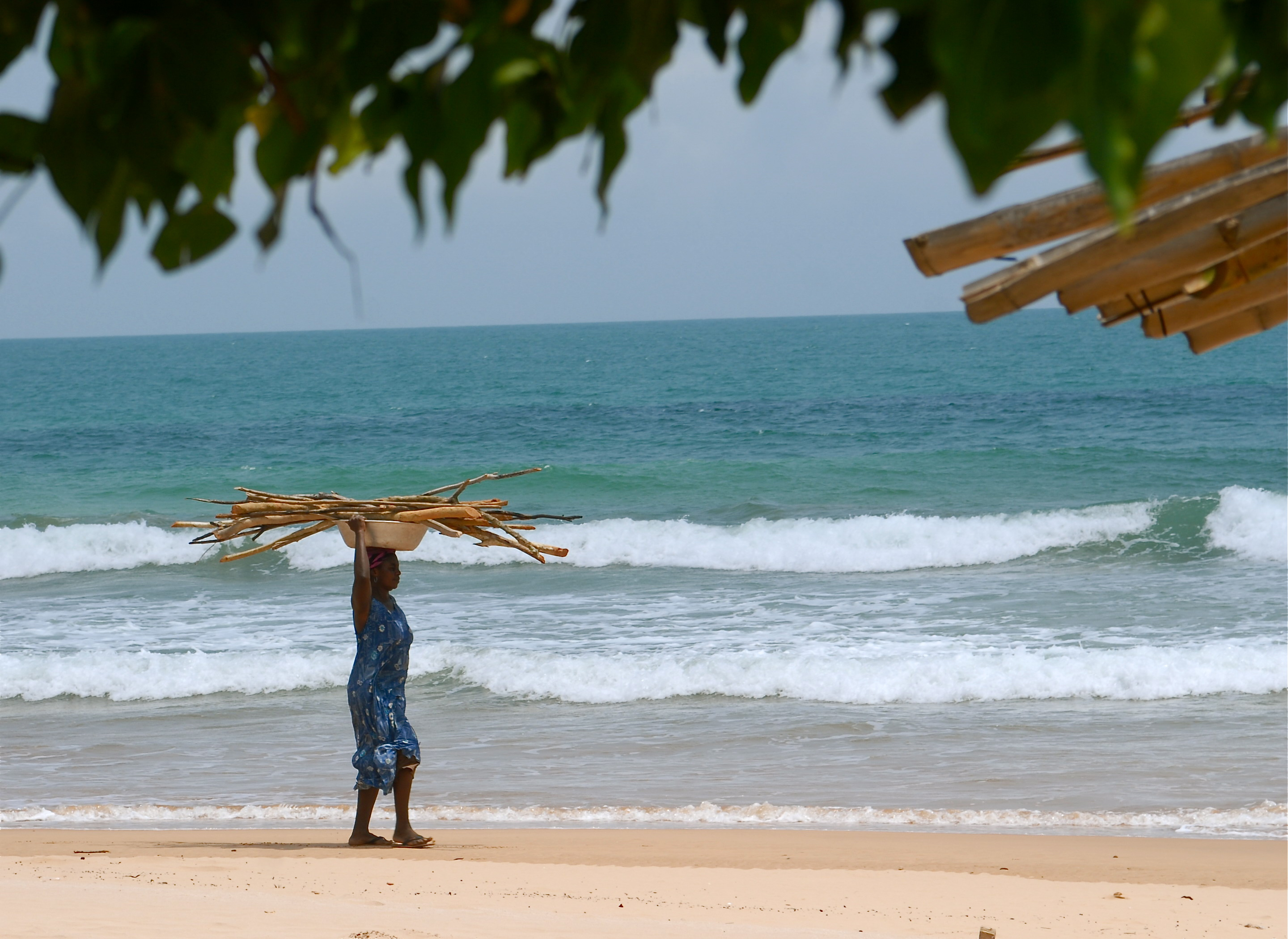
- Beach near Sekondi-Takoradi

- Coordinates: 5°30′N 2°30′W
- Country: Ghana
- Capital: Sekondi-Takoradi
- Districts: 22

Government
  - Regional Minister: Joseph Nelson

Area
  - Total: 13,842 km^{2} (5,344 sq mi)
  - Rank: Ranked 4th

Population (2021 Census)
  - Total: 2,060,585
  - Rank: Ranked 6th
  - Density: 148.86/km^{2} (385.56/sq mi)

GDP (PPP)
  - Year: 2013
  - Per capita: $5,150

GDP (Nominal)
  - Year: 2013
  - Per capita: $2,500
- Time zone: GMT
- Area code: 031
- ISO 3166 code: GH-WP
- HDI (2022): ▲0.648 medium · 3rd

The Western region, located in south Ghana, spreads from the Ivory Coast (Comoé District) in the west to the Central region in the east, includes the capital and large twin city of Sekondi-Takoradi on the coast, coastal Axim, and a hilly inland area including Elubo. It includes Ghana's southernmost location, Cape Three Points, where crude oil was discovered in commercial quantities in June 2007. The region covers an area of 13,842 km^{2}, and had a population of 2,060,585 at the 2021 Census. It has a coastline that stretches from South Ghana's border with the Ivory Coast to the boundary with the Central region on the east.

== Tourism ==
The largest rivers are the Ankobra River, the Bia River, and the Pra River in the east, with the Tano River partly forming the western national border. The area is known for the UNESCO World Heritage Site, the village of Nzulezo built entirely on stilts and platforms over water and the Ankasa Protected Area. There is a series of imposing Portuguese, Dutch, British, and Brandenburgian forts along the coast, built from 1512 on.

The region is an Akan region comprised Wassa, Ahanta, and Nzema. Wassa is the largest tribe in the region. However, the popular language spoken in the region is Fanti. The Western region boasts many beaches and mining companies. The popular Ghana Gold fields mine is located in the region at Tarkwa.

== Education ==
The Western region has many post-secondary schools, including teachers' and nursing colleges, and two universities--University of Mines and Technology (in Tarkwa) and Takoradi Technical University (formerly known as Takoradi Polytechnic).

== Administrative divisions ==
Before the regional demarcation in December 2018, the region had 23 MMDA's (made up of 1 Metropolitan, 11 Municipal and 11 Ordinary Assemblies). Therefore, as part of this reorganisation, nine MMDA's (those in bold and asterisks below, which were 3 Municipal and 6 Ordinary Assemblies) were removed from the Western region and formed into a new Western North region with its new capital at Wiawso.

The political administration of the region is through the local government system. Under this administration system, the region is divided into 14 MMDA's (made up of 1 Metropolitan, 8 Municipal and 5 Ordinary Assemblies). Each District, Municipal or Metropolitan Assembly, is administered by a Chief Executive, representing the central government but deriving authority from an Assembly headed by a presiding member elected from among the members themselves. The current list is as follows:

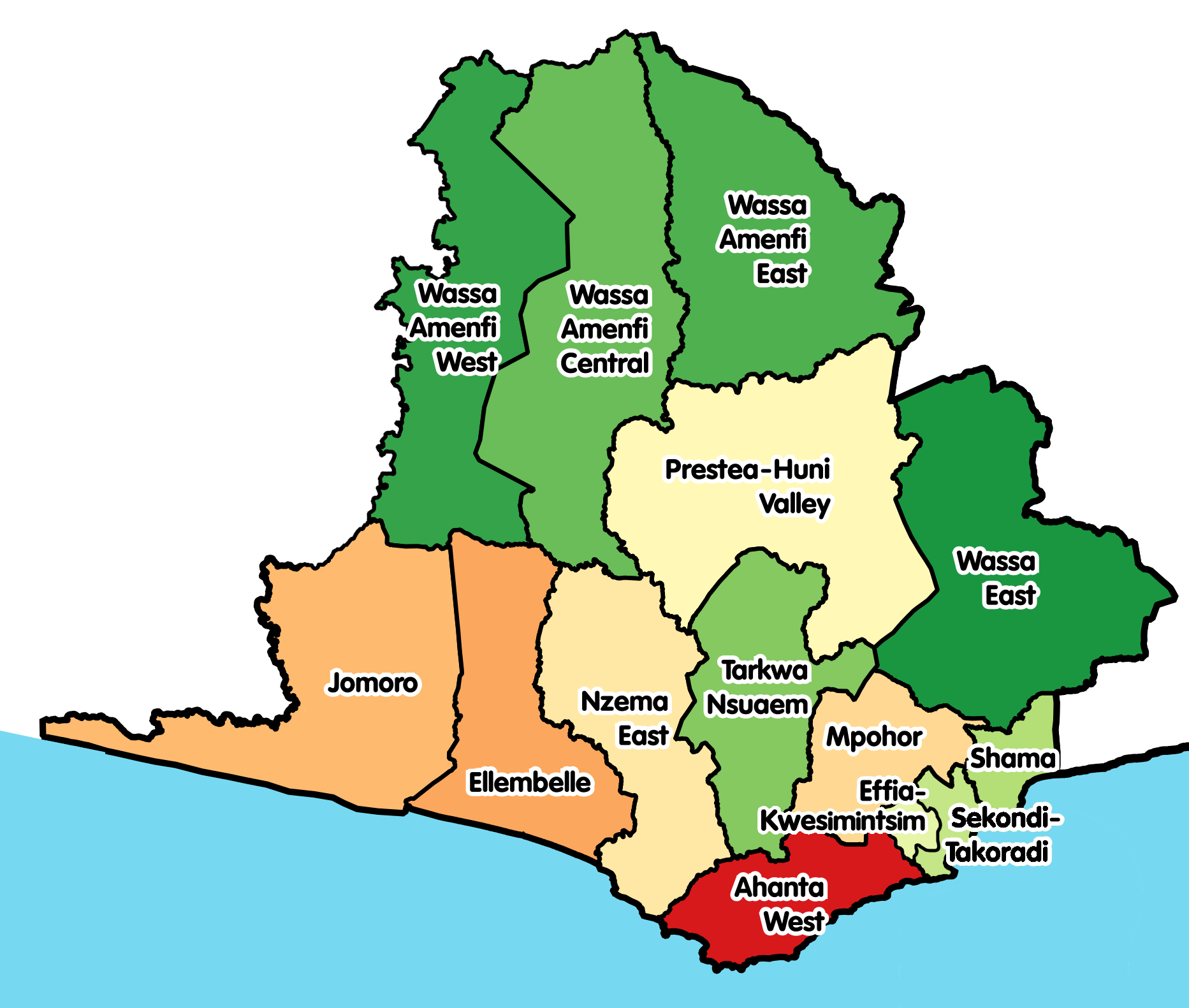
Districts of the Western region

Districts of the Western region
#	MMDA name	Capital	MMDA type	Population census 2010	Population projection 2019
1	Ahanta West	Agona Nkwanta	Municipal	106,215	139,188
-	**Aowin***	Enchi	Municipal	117,886	154,661
-	**Bia East***	Adabokrom	Ordinary	27,393	37,108
-	**Bia West***	Essam	Ordinary	88,939	111,355
-	**Bodi***	Bodi	Ordinary	53,314	68,055
2	Ellembelle	Nkroful	Ordinary	87,501	114,441
3	Jomoro	Half Assini	Municipal	150,107	194,808
-	**Juabeso***	Juaboso	Ordinary	58,435	77,678
4	Mpohor	Mpohor	Ordinary	42,923	55,678
5	Nzema East	Axim	Municipal	60,828	80,480
6	Prestea-Huni Valley	Bogoso	Municipal	159,304	207,237
-	**Sefwi-Akontombra***	Sefwi Akontombra	Ordinary	82,467	108,266
-	**Bibiani/Anhwiaso/Bekwai***	Bibiani	Municipal	123,272	160,844
-	**Sefwi-Wiawso***	Wiawso	Municipal	139,200	182,510
7	Sekondi-Takoradi	**Sekondi**	Metropolitan	559,548	726,905
8	Effia-Kwesimintsim	Kwesimintsim	Ordinary	N/A	N/A
9	Shama	Shama	Ordinary	81,966	105,173
-	**Suaman***	Dadieso	Ordinary	20,529	27,832
10	Tarkwa-Nsuaem	Tarkwa	Municipal	90,477	117,550
11	Wassa Amenfi Central	Manso Amenfi	Ordinary	69,014	89,703
12	Wassa Amenfi East	Wassa-Akropong	Municipal	83,478	108,272
13	Wassa Amenfi West	Asankragua	Municipal	92,152	120,643
14	Wassa East	Daboase	Ordinary	81,073	105,163
Total				2,376,021	3,093,201

== Famous native citizens ==
Famous native citizens of Western region
#	Citizen	Settlement
1	Samuel Inkoom	Sekondi-Takoradi
2	Nadia Buari	Sekondi-Takoradi
3	Boris Kodjoe	Sekondi-Takoradi
4	John Atta Mills	Tarkwa
5	Kwame Nkrumah	Nkroful (Nzema)
6	Anton Wilhelm Amo	Axim (Nzema)
7	Joseph Boahen Aidoo	Wassa, Afransie
8	Kofi Kinaata	Takoradi
9	Gyedu-Blay Ambolley	Sekondi-Takoradi
10	Godfried Gambrah	Sekondi-Takoradi
11	Kwame Yeboah	Wassa
12	Paa Kwasi	Axim (Nzema)
13	Bozoma Afiba Mamekyi Saint John	Nzema
