= Juaboso-Bodi District =

- District
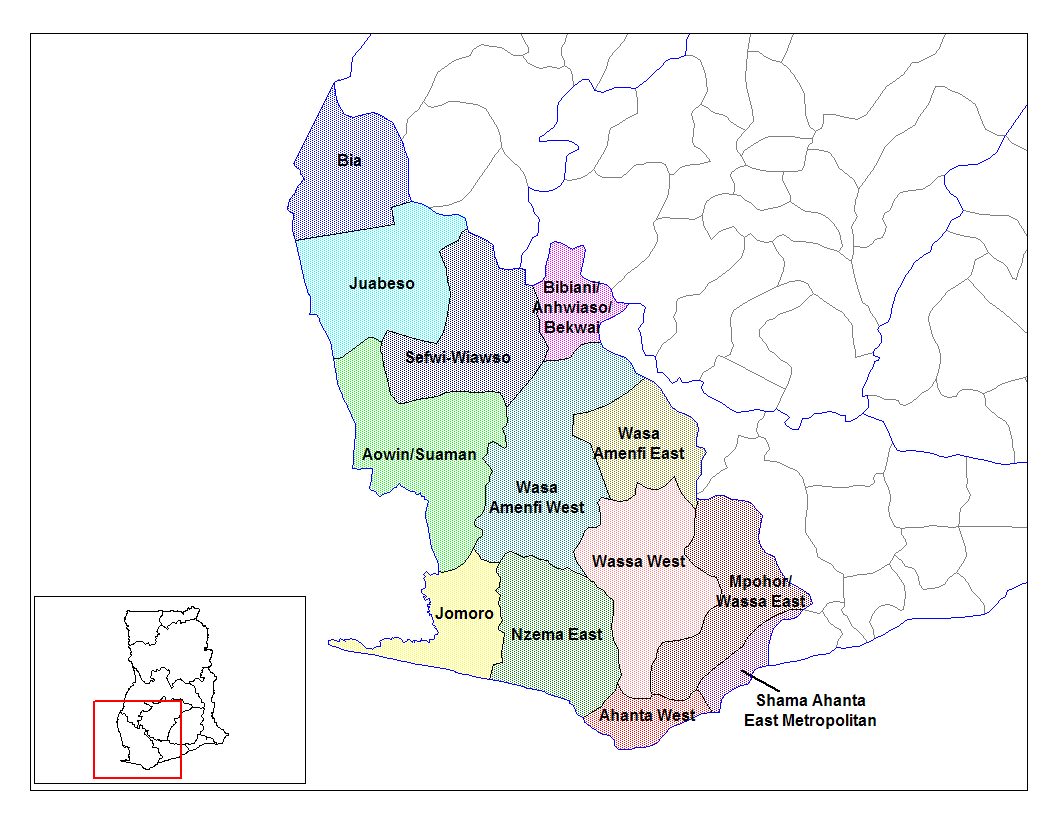
- Districts of Western North Region

- Location of Juaboso-Bodi District within Western North
- Coordinates: 6°20′25.08″N 2°49′29.64″W
- Country: Ghana
- Region: Western North
- Capital: Juaboso
- Time zone: UTC+0 (GMT)
- ISO 3166 code: GH-WP-JB

Juaboso-Bodi District is a former district that was located in Western Region, Ghana. Originally it was formerly part of the then-larger Juaboso-Bia District from 1988, which was created from the former Sefwi-Bibiani District Council, until the northwest part of the district was split off to create Bia District in August 2004. The remaining part was renamed Juaboso-Bodi District. On 28 June 2012, it was split off into two new districts: Juaboso District (capital: Juaboso) and Bodi District (capital: Bodi).

The district assembly was located in the northwest part of Western Region and had Juaboso as its capital town.
