= Juaboso-Bia District =

- District
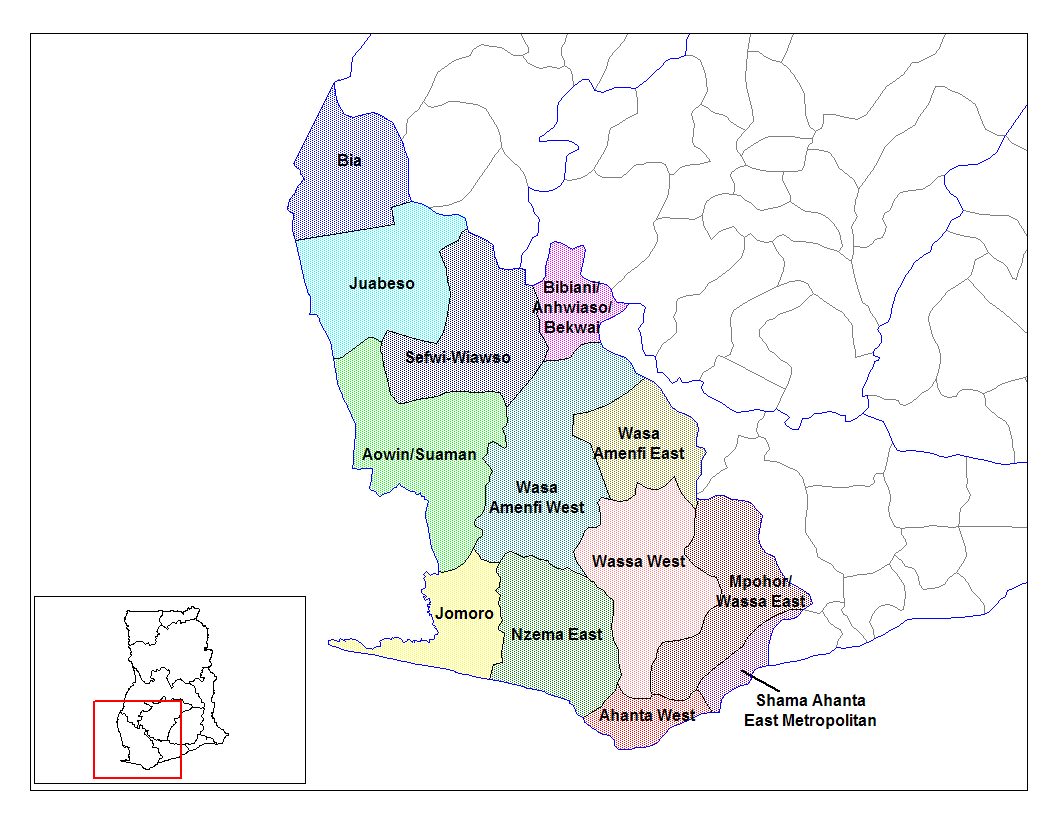
- Districts of Western North Region

- Location of Juaboso-Bia District within Western North
- Coordinates: 6°20′25.08″N 2°49′29.64″W
- Country: Ghana
- Region: Western North
- Capital: Juaboso
- Time zone: UTC+0 (GMT)
- ISO 3166 code: GH-WP-JB

Juaboso-Bia District is a former district that was located in Western Region (now currently at Western North Region), Ghana. Originally created as an ordinary district assembly in 1988, which was created from the former Sefwi-Bibiani District Council. However, in August 2004, it was split off into two new districts: Juaboso-Bodi District (capital: Juaboso) and Bia District (capital: Sefwi Essam). The district assembly was located in the northwest part of Western Region and had Juaboso as its capital town.
