= Bodi, Ghana =

Bodi, Ghana may refer to:

- Bodi (district)
- Bodi (Ghana parliament constituency)
- Bodi
