= Sefwi Bodi =

- District Capital
- Location in Ghana
- Coordinates: 6°13′12″N 2°45′11″W
- Country: Ghana
- Region: Western North Region
- District: Bodi (district)
- Capital: Sefwi Bodi
- Elevation: 200 ft (60 m)
- Time zone: GMT
  - Summer (DST): GMT

Sefwi Bodi is a town in the Western North Region of Ghana. The people in this community are mainly Sefwi people. In June 2012, Sefwi Bodi wa elevated as the capital of the then newly created Bodi (district). Bodi is 60 km west of Sefwi Wiawso the regional capital. Bodi is considered one of the breadbaskets of Ghana. Greater percentage of foodstuffs sent to major cities like Kumasi and Accra come from Sefwi Bodi. Sefwi Bodi is noted for the Bodi Senior High School which is the only second cycle institution in that area of the country.

== Economy ==
The economy of Sefwi Bodi is an agrarian one with over 80% of the population engaged in farming activities. The predominant cash crops grown in Sefwi Bodi is cocoa making it one of the highest cocoa producing towns in Ghana. The issue of child labour in these cocoa growing areas in Ghana have become issue of great concern.

== Festival ==
The Alluolue Festival is the major Festival celebrated by Sefwi Bodi and all the Sefwi people to mark an event that took place in the past. The festival brings together people for the planning of development and sew bonds of unity and friendship. During the festival, visitors are welcomed to share food and drinks. The people put on traditional clothes and there is durbar of chiefs. There is also dancing and drumming.

== Notable Personalities ==
- Sampson Ahi a politician
