= Bia District =

- Former District
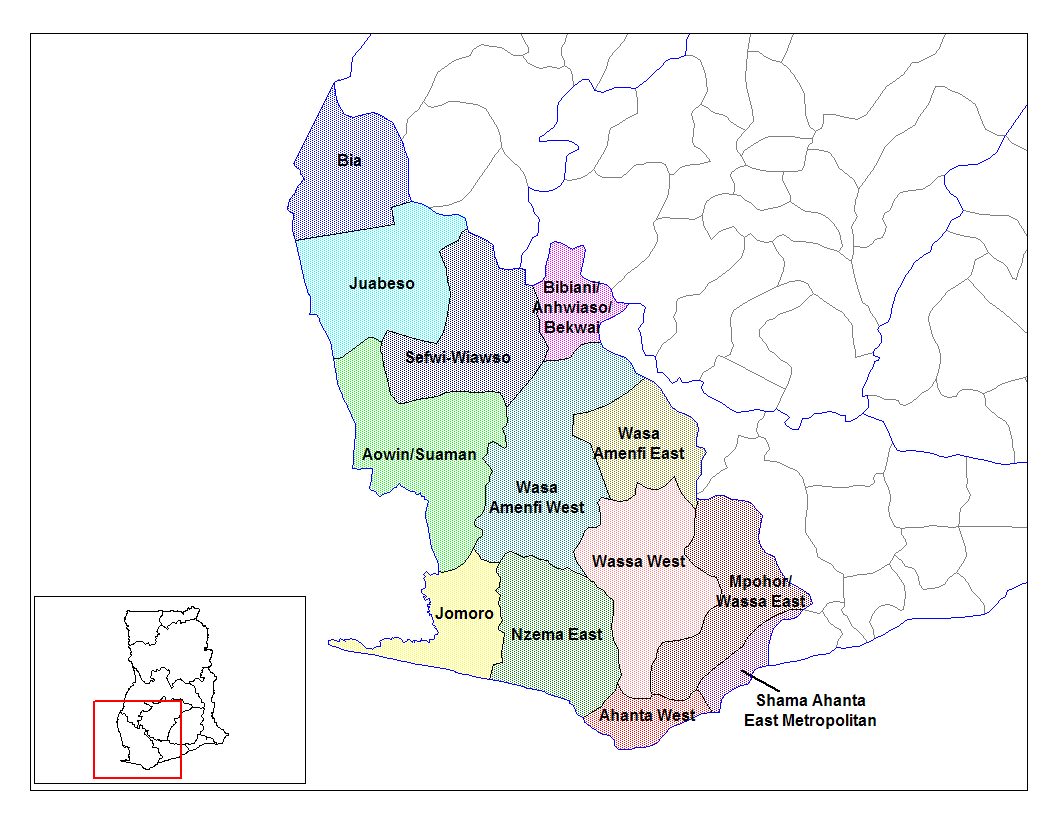
- Districts of Western North Region

- Location of Bia District within Western North
- Coordinates: 6°29′2.4″N 3°4′58.8″W
- Country: Ghana
- Region: Western North
- Capital: Sefwi Essam

Government
  - District Executive: Hon. Joseph Apreku
- Time zone: UTC+0 (GMT)
- ISO 3166 code: GH-WP-BI

Bia District is a former district that was located in Western Region, Ghana. Originally it was formerly part of the then-larger Juaboso-Bia District in 1988, which was created from the former Sefwi-Bibiani District Council, until the northwest part of the district was split off to create Bia District; thus the remaining part has been renamed as Juaboso-Bodi District. However, on 28 June 2012, it was split off into two new districts: Bia West District (capital: Sefwi Essam) and Bia East District (capital: Asokore Adaborkrom). The district assembly was located in the northwest part of Western Region and had Sefwi Essam as its capital town.

== Sources ==
- "Districts of Ghana". Statoids.
- Bia District
