= Benchema-Nkatieso =

- Village
- Location in Ghana
- Coordinates: 6°26′5″N 2°46′13″W
- Country: Ghana
- Region: Western North Region
- District: Juabeso District
- Time zone: GMT
  - Summer (DST): GMT

Benchema and Nkatieso are neighboring villages in the Juabeso district, a district in the southwest quadrant of Western North Region of Ghana, about 86 miles east of the Ivorian border.

== Demographics ==
=== People ===
The Sefwis of Benchema and Nkatieso speak a dialect of the Akan language, and the village's collective literacy rate is nearly 90%. Benchema's area is 23 km^{2}, and that of Nkatieso 31 km^{2}, making a total of 54 km^{2}.

== Economy ==
Together, Benchema and Nkatieso form a community jointly sustained by local food production and outside trade.

== Education ==
Each of the villages boasts of both public and private primary schools and middle schools, but the closest high school is located in another municipality five miles away—along with the nearest police station.

== Transport ==
Buses travelling on unpaved roads is the major form of transportation to major cities; Kumasi, the Ghana's second largest city, is a two-hour bus-ride from Benchema-Nkatieso. Kumasi is also home to the university nearest to Benchema-Nkatieso, the Kwame Nkrumah University of Science and Technology. Wiawso Teacher Training College in Sefwi-Wiawso is 22-miles from here. University of Mines and Technology (UDS) in Tarkwa, Western Region is about three hours drive from Benchema-Nkatieso.

Although Benchema and Nkatieso are connected to Ghana's power grid, the villages do not have a water supply network. Instead, boreholes provide safe drinking water for the residents. The Wiawso-Benchema Trunk Road is completed and also available. The tarring of the road from Wiawso to Benchema would make travelling along the Accra-Kumas-Bibiani-Wiawso-Benchema Highway very easy and time saving. Goods and services are transported to the towns and at a lower cost. The project is funded by the Ghana Highway Authority (GHA) through the Government of Ghana (GoG).
