= Sayerano =

Community in Western North Region, Ghana

- Town
- Location of Sayerano, Ghana in Western North Region
- Coordinates: 06°28′36.5″N 02°51′56″W
- Country: Ghana
- Region: Western North Region
- District: Juaboso District
- Time zone: UTC0 (GMT)

Sayerano also known as (Sefwi Sayerano) is a community in the Juaboso District in the Western North Region of Ghana. As at 2026, the Twafohene of Sefwi Sayerano is Nana Kwasi Sampa. The Asempaneye Forest is located near the town.

== Shooting ==
In July 2026, the Sefwi Wiawso Divisional Police Command stormed the community to arrest a suspected drug peddler. The members of the community tried to resist the arrest which led to a confrontation and the Police allegedly made some shots. The shooting claimed three lives whiles others had gunshot wounds and injuries.

8 security personnel of the Ghana Police Service were indicted after the incident.

The Twafohene later confirmed calm has been restored after the shooting.
