= Bia East (Ghana parliament constituency) =

Parliamentary constituency in Ghana

- constituency for the Parliament of Ghana
- District: Bia East District
- Region: Western North Region of Ghana

Current constituency
- Party: National Democratic Congress
- MP: Richard Acheampong

Bia East is one of the constituencies represented in the Parliament of Ghana. It elects one Member of Parliament (MP) by the first past the post system of election. Bia East is located in the Bia East District of the Western North Region of Ghana.

== Members of Parliament ==
Election	Member	Party
2016	Richard Acheampong	National Democratic Congress
