= Juabeso (Ghana parliament constituency) =

Parliamentary constituency in Ghana

- constituency for the Parliament of Ghana
- District: Juabeso District
- Region: Western North Region of Ghana

Current constituency
- Party: National Democratic Congress
- MP: Kwabena Mintah Akandoh

Kwabena Mintah Akandoh is the member of parliament for the constituency. He was elected on the ticket of the National Democratic Congress (NDC) won a majority of 17,619 votes to become the MP. He was also the incumbent MP before the 2008 elections.

== See also ==
- List of Ghana Parliament constituencies
