= Richard Acheampong =

Ghanaian politician

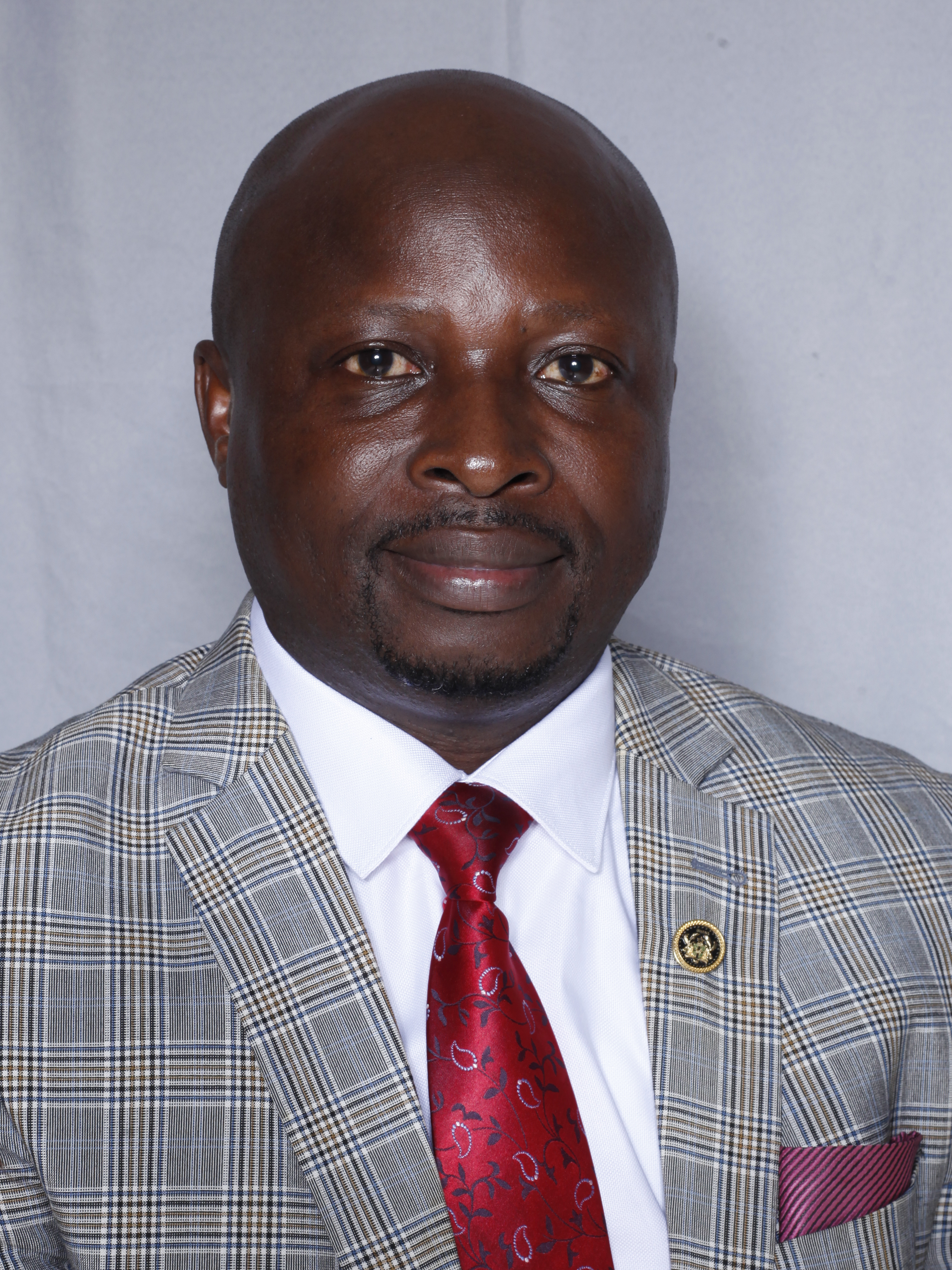

Member of the Ghana Parliament for Bia East
- Incumbent
- Assumed office 7 January 2013

Personal details
- Born: 18 May 1970 (age 56)
- Party: National Democratic Congress

Richard Acheampong (born May 18, 1970) is a Ghanaian politician and member of the Seventh Parliament of the Fourth Republic of Ghana representing the Bia East Constituency in the Western Region on the ticket of the National Democratic Congress.

== Early life and education ==
Acheampong was born on May 18, 1970. He hails from Adabokrom, a town in the Western Region of Ghana. He entered University College of Management Studies, Kumasi in 2011 and obtained his bachelor's degree in Human Resource. He also attended the Mountcrest University College, Kanda- Accra in 2016 and obtained his bachelor's degree in law.

== Career ==
Acheampong was a banker. He also worked as an assistant manager at Nfana Rural Bank Sampa.

== Politics ==
Acheampong is a member of the National Democratic Congress (NDC). In 2012, he contested for the Bia East seat on the ticket of the NDC sixth parliament of the fourth republic and won.

== Personal life ==
Acheampong is a Christian (Assemblies of God Church). He is married (with five children).

== Controversy ==
In April 2017, the British High Commission in Ghana allegedly accused Acheampong, George Boakye, Johnson Kwaku Adu, and Joseph Benhazin Dahah of helping their relatives enter the UK illegally using their diplomatic passports. He used his diplomatic passport to secure a holiday visa for his spouse for a two-week holiday, continued to stay in the UK for more than a year.
