= Bodi (Ghana parliament constituency) =

Parliamentary constituency in Ghana

- constituency for the Parliament of Ghana
- District: Bodi District
- Region: Western North Region of Ghana

Current constituency
- Party: National Democratic Congress
- MP: Sampson Ahi

Bodi is one of the constituencies represented in the Parliament of Ghana. It elects one Member of Parliament (MP) by the first past the post system of election. Bodi is located in the Bodi District of the Western North Region of Ghana. Sampson Ahi has remained the only member of Parliament ever since the constituency was formed.

== Members of Parliament ==
Election	Member	Party
2016	Sampson Ahi	National Democratic Congress
