= Sampson Ahi =

Ghanaian politician

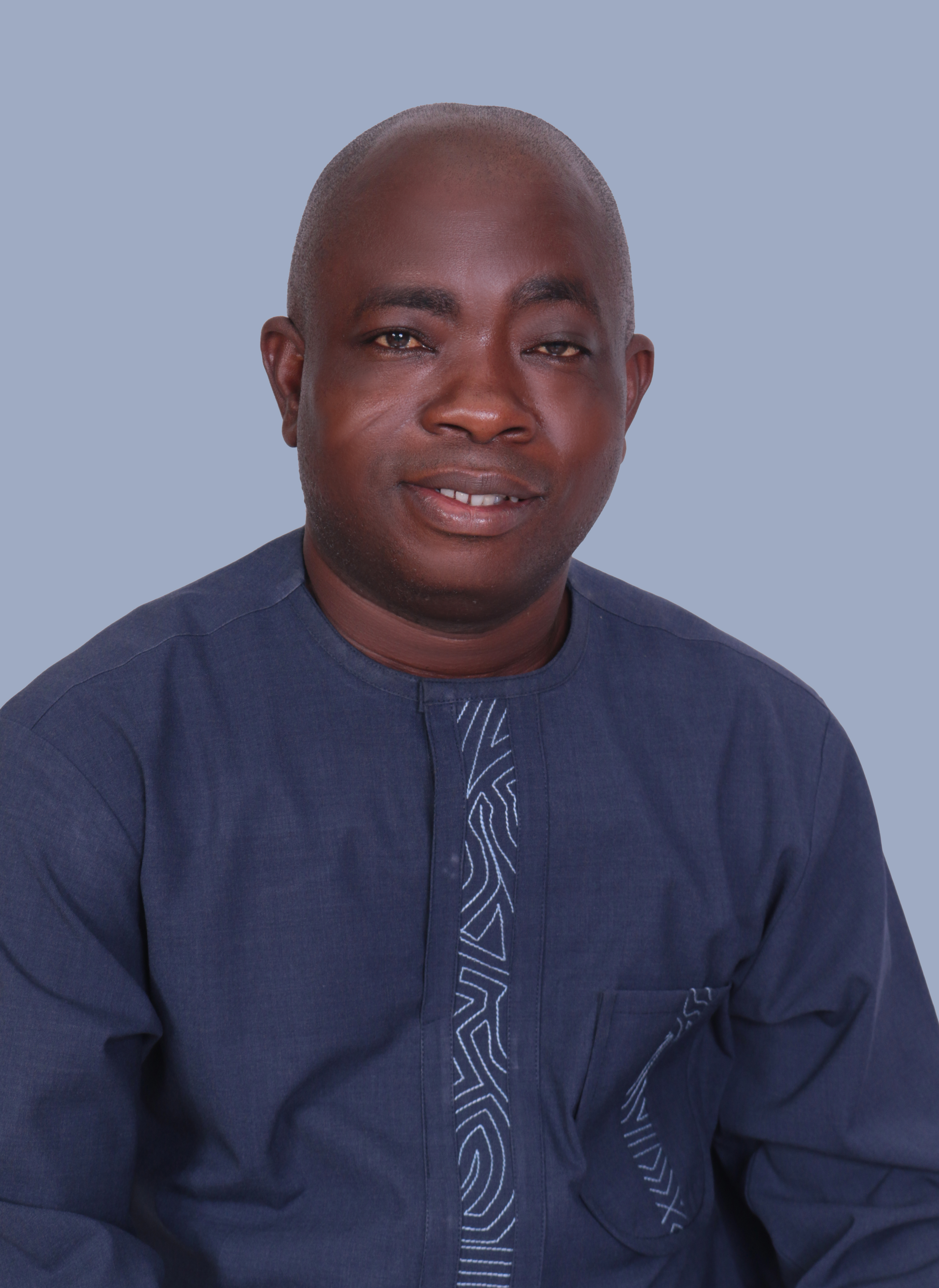

Member of the Ghana Parliament for Bodi Constituency
- Incumbent
- Assumed office 7 January 2013
- Preceded by: New

Member of the Ghana Parliament for Juabeso constituency
- In office 7 January 2005 – 6 January 2013
- Preceded by: Anthony K. Gyapong-Mensah
- Succeeded by: Kwabena Mintah Akandoh

Personal details
- Born: 14 September 1976 (age 49)
- Party: National Democratic Congress
- Education: University of Ghana; Ghana Institute of Management and Public Administration
- Occupation: Politician

Sampson Ahi is a Ghanaian politician and member of the Seventh Parliament of the Fourth Republic of Ghana representing the Bodi constituency in the Western region on the ticket of the National Democratic Congress. He is the Deputy Minister-Designate for Trade, Agribusiness, and Industry.

== Early life and education ==
Ahi was born on 14 September 1976. He hails from Sefwi Bodi a town in the Western Region of Ghana. He received his Bachelor of Arts degree from the University of Ghana, Legon and his Executive Masters in Governance and Leadership (EMGL) from the Ghana Institute of Management and Public Administration (GIMPA).

== Career ==
Prior to entering parliament, Ahi worked as a sector manager for Armar Jaro from 2003 to 2004. He was the Deputy Minister of Works and Housing under the Mahama administration.

== Politics ==
Ahi entered parliament on 7 January 2005 representing the Juabeso constituency on the ticket of the National Democratic Congress. He represented the constituency until 2012 when he stood for the seat of the then newly created Bodi constituency. He has been the member of parliament of the constituency to date.

== Personal life ==
Ahi is married with five children. He identifies as a Christian.
