= Kwabena Mintah Akandoh =

Ghanaian politician (born 1980)

The Honourable Kwabena Mintah Akandoh
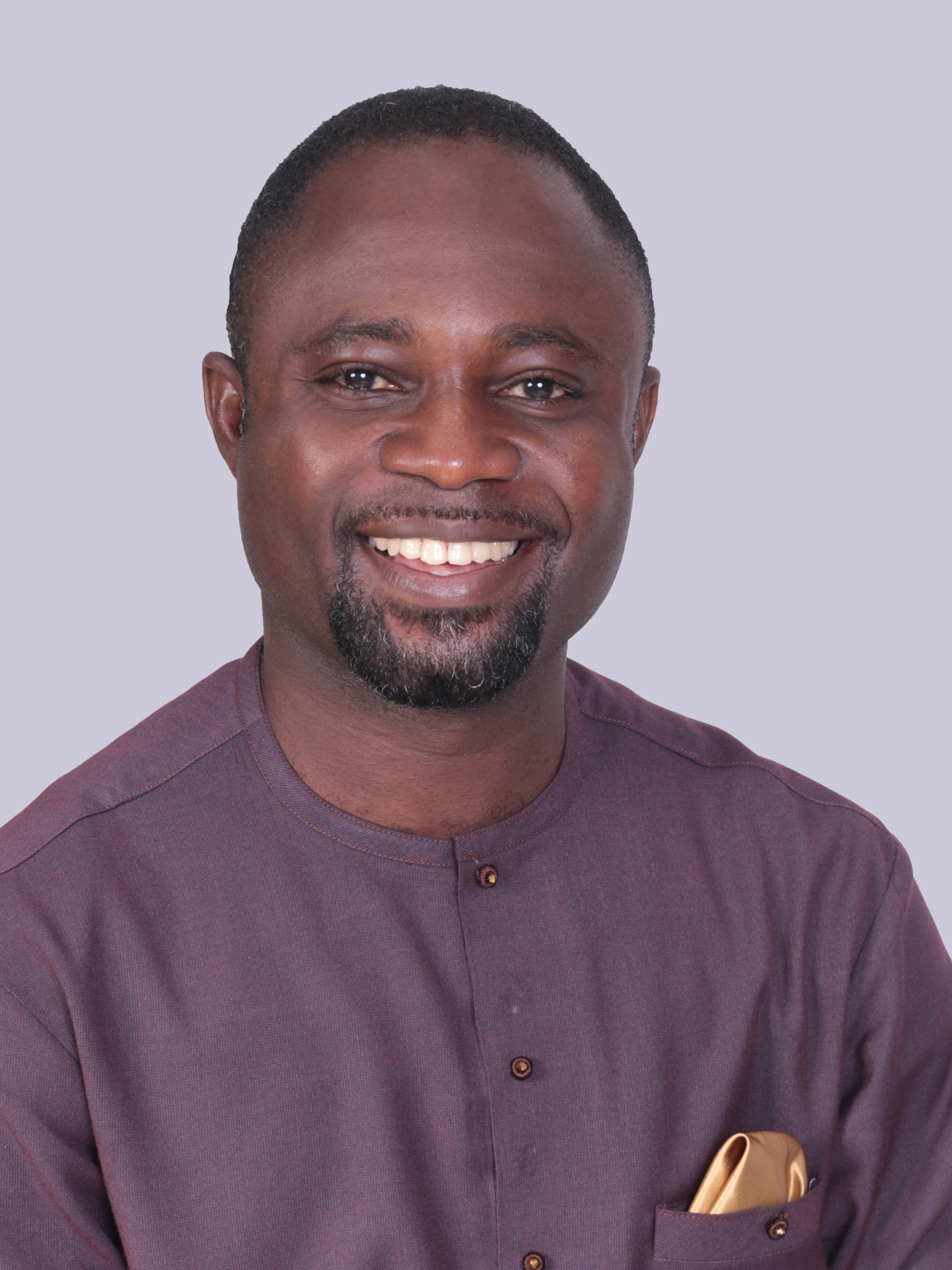

Member of the Ghana Parliament for Juaboso Constituency
- Incumbent
- Assumed office 7 January 2013
- Preceded by: Sampson Ahi

Minister of Health
- Incumbent
- Assumed office February 2025
- Preceded by: Bernard Okoe-Boye

Personal details
- Born: 19 June 1980 (age 46)
- Party: National Democratic Congress
- Education: Anglican Senior High School, Kumasi; University of Ghana; University of Cape Coast; Mountcrest University College
- Occupation: Politician

Kwabena Mintah Akandoh (born 19 June 1980) is a Ghanaian politician and member of the Ninth Parliament of the Fourth Republic of Ghana representing the Juaboso Constituency in the Western North Region on the ticket of the National Democratic Congress. He was appointed by President Dramani Mahama as the Minister of Health.

== Early life and education ==
Akandoh was born on 19 June 1980. He hails from Sefwi Antobia a town in the Western North Region of Ghana. He obtained his Bachelor of Science in Statistics and Mathematics from the University of Cape Coast in 2007. He also holds a Bachelor of Law degree (LL.B) from Mountcrest University College and Masters of Law Degree (LL.M) in Natural Resources Law from the University of Ghana.

== Career ==
Prior to entering politics, Akandoh was assistant director in charge of National Voluntary Programme of the National Service Scheme at its Head Office in Accra.

== Politics ==
Akandoh entered parliament on 7 January 2013 representing the Juaboso constituency on the ticket of the National Democratic Congress. He was elected to represent the constituency in the Seventh, Eighth and Ninth Parliament of the Fourth Republic of Ghana.

=== 2016 election ===
Akandoh contested the Juaboso constituency on the ticket of the National Democratic Congress during the 2016 Ghanaian general election and won with 17,233 votes representing 51.91% of the total votes. He was elected over Martha Kwayie Manu of New Patriotic Party, Stephen Mintah Cletron of the NDP, Oppong Ernestina of the Convention People's Party and Abdul-Karim Ibraimah Ibrahim of the PNC. They obtained 15,604 votes, 164 votes, 111 votes and 87 votes respectively, equivalent to 47.00%, 0.49%, 0.33% and 0.26% of the total votes respectively.

=== 2020 election ===
Akandoh was again elected as a member of parliament for the Juaboso constituency on the ticket of the National Democratic Congress during the 2020 Ghanaian general election with 22, 304 votes representing 53.10% of the total votes. He won the election over Martha Kwayie Manu of the New Patriotic Party who polled 19, 199 votes which is equivalent to 45.70%, parliamentary candidate for the GUM Teye Nicholas had 341 votes representing 0.81%, Elijah Appiah Frimpong of the PNC had 94 votes representing 0.22% and the parliamentary candidate for the Convention People's Party Oppong Ernestina had 69 votes, representing 0.16% of the total votes.

=== 2024 election ===
Akandoh was re-elected as the member of parliament for Juaboso Constituency on the ticket of National Democratic Congress NDC in the December 2024 parliamentary election with 20,724 votes representing 52.48% over Alex Apaabeng of the NPP 18,672 votes representing 47.29% and the CPP candidate Oppong Ernestina with 92 votes representing 0.23%.

== Personal life ==
Akandoh is married with five children. He identifies as a Christian and belongs to the Anglican denomination.

Akandoh had an accident on the Nyinahin-Kumasi road in the Ashanti Region of Ghana on Saturday, 29 July 2023, when his car collided with a Sprinter.
