= Sefwi Adabokrom =

- Town
- Location within Ghana
- Coordinates: 6.82159°N 3.01943°W
- Country: Ghana
- Region: Western North Region
- District: Bia East District
- Time zone: GMT
  - Summer (DST): GMT

Adabokrom is a town in Western North Region of Ghana. It is the capital of Bia East. Adabokrom was named the District capital after Bia East District split from Bia District in 2012. Adabokrom is about 250 km west of Kumasi. The town is noted for cocoa production.

== History ==
The settlement of Adabokrom began in the twentieth century driven by an upsurge of the cocoa industry. According to oral histories, until cocoa Adabokrom was a dense forest zone with one hamlet.

== Geology ==
The soil in this zone is mainly of the ferric acrisols and dystricfluvisols type. Ferric acrisols cover about 98% of the District, which supports the cultivation of crops including cocoa, coffee, oil palm, plantain, cocoyam and cassava, and other vegetables.

== Economy ==
Migrant cocoa farmers such as Asantes, Bonos, Kusasis, the Ahantas, Ewes, settled in Adabokrom. About 70% of the cocoa farms in the district belong to the migrant community.

== Geography ==
Adabokrom Grotto is located at the town's outskirts. It consists of a small rocky peak with natural formations and scenery. It serves as a sacred religious worship centre for the annual pilgrimage of the Catholic community. A natural spring in the midst of the attractive rocks couples with its serene environment.

The Elluoe (Yam Festival) is celebrated in November–December by the Sefwi people. It symbolises the first (minor) harvest of new yam usually around July and August. As customs demand, the chiefs are prohibited from eating the new yam until appropriate rituals have been performed.

Adabokrom vegetation is of the moist semi-deciduous (equatorial rain forest) type. The forest vegetation with its variety of tree species including wawa (Triplochitonselerexylon), mahogany (Khayainvorensis), esa (Celtis), ofram (Terminalia superba), edinam (Entandrophragmaivorensio), onyina (Ceiba petandra), kyenkyen (Antiaris Africana) and odum (Milicia exelsa).

== Festival ==
Like all the other communities within the Sefwi-Wiawso traditional area, the chiefs and people of Sefwi Adabokrom celebrate the Alluolue Festival. This festival marks an event that took place in the past and also thanks the gods for the yam harvest.

== Economy ==
Farming: The primary occupation is farming, including cultivation of cash crops and food crops. The predominant cash crop grown in this area is cocoa. The cocoa sector offers the biggest employment and income generation, employing about 80% of the working population. Another important farming activity in this area is livestock rearing.

Trading: Adabokrom is not a commercial center. However, Thursdays is the weekly market day for major towns such as : Kumasi, Dormaa Ahenkro, Mim Ahafo and other places. Due to the poor nature of roads in Adabokrom and its catchment areas, farmers find it difficult to transport their produce to the market center.

== Education ==
The notable educational institution in this town is the Adabokrom community Senior high school.
