= Sefwi Akontombra District =

Sefwi-Akontombra District
- District
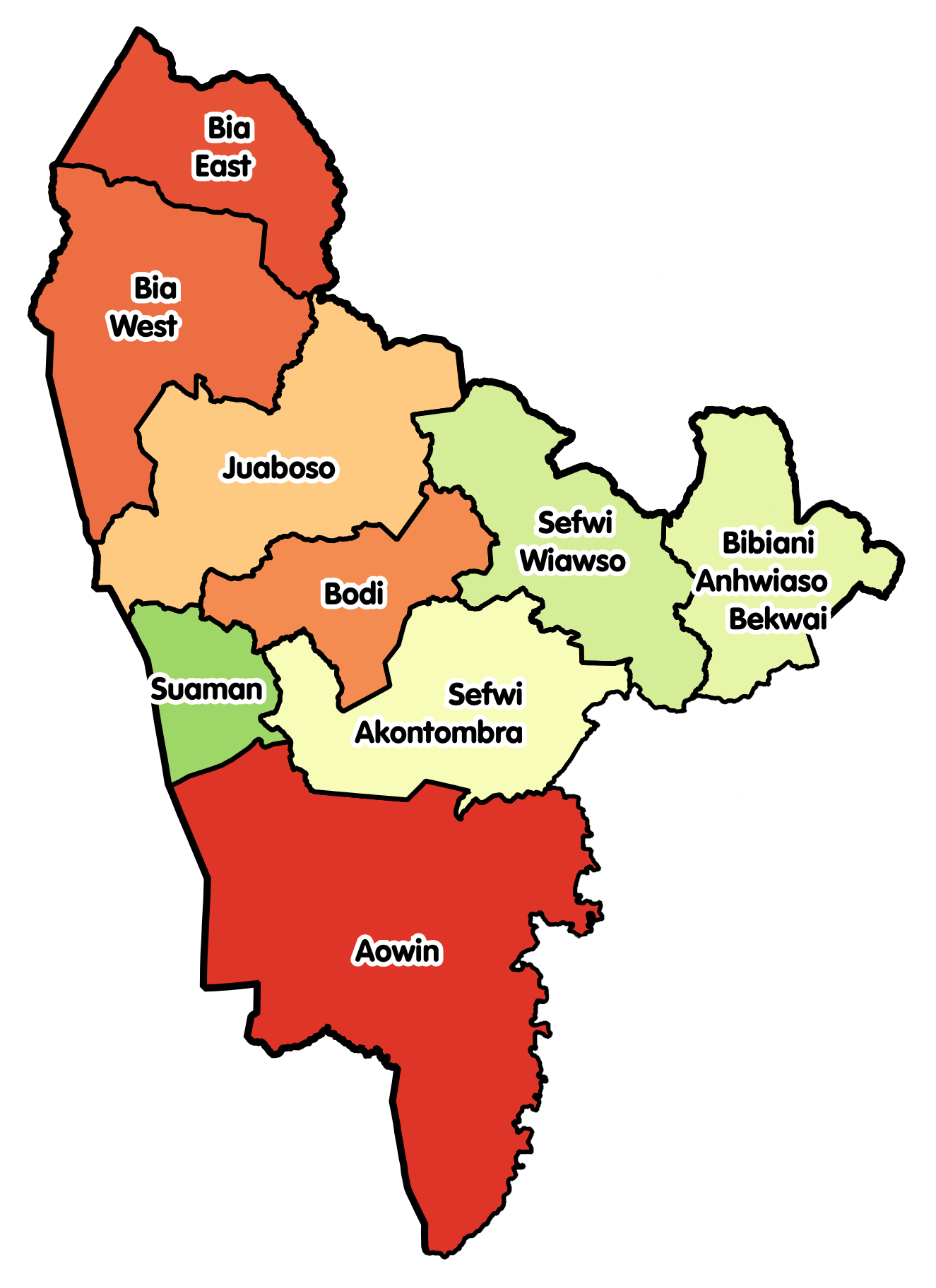
- Districts of Western North Region

- Location of Sefwi-Akontombra District within Western North
- Coordinates: 6°2′8″N 2°52′30″W
- Country: Ghana
- Region: Western North
- Capital: Akontombra

Government
  - District Executive: Hon. Peter Nkuah
  - Succeeded: Hon. Appiah-Kubi Baidoo

Area
  - Total: 1,157 km^{2} (447 sq mi)

Population (2021 census)
  - Total: 70,225
  - Density: 60.70/km^{2} (157.2/sq mi)
- Time zone: UTC+0 (GMT)
- ISO 3166 code: GH-WN-SA

Sefwi-Akontombra District is one of the nine districts in Western North Region, Ghana. Originally it was formerly part of the then-larger Sefwi-Wiawso District in 1988, which was created from the former Sefwi-Bibiani District Council, until the southwest part of the district was split off to create Sefwi-Akontombra District on 29 February 2008; thus the remaining part was retained as Sefwi-Wiawso District (which it was later elevated to municipal district assembly status in March 2012 (effectively 28 June 2012) to become Sefwi-Wiawso Municipal District). The district assembly is located in the northeast part of Western North Region and has Akontombra as its capital town.

== Sources ==
- "Districts of Ghana". Statoids.
- GhanaDistricts.com
