= Sefwi-Bibiani District =

Sefwi-Bibiani District Council
- Former District Council
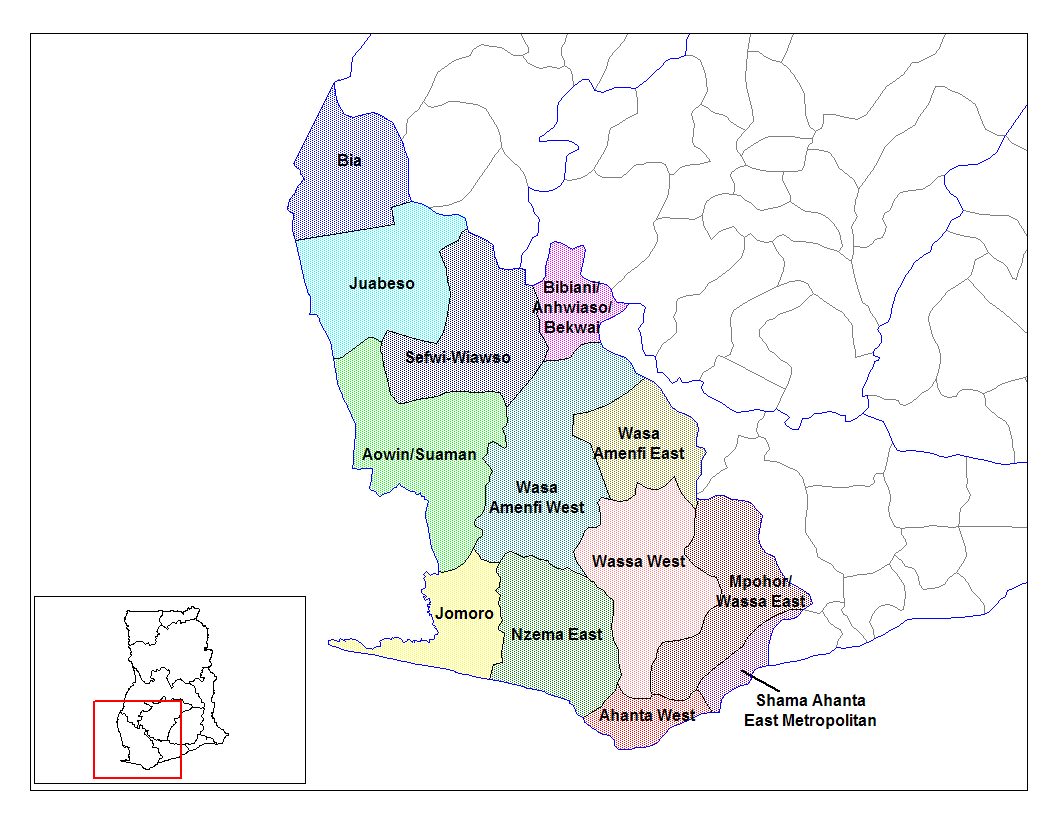
- Districts of Western Region

- Location of Sefwi-Bibiani District Council within Western
- Coordinates: 6°12′57″N 2°29′6″W
- Country: Ghana
- Region: Western
- Capital: Wiawso
- Time zone: UTC+0 (GMT)
- ISO 3166 code: GH-WP-SB

Sefwi-Bibiani District is a former district council that was located in Western Region (now currently in Western North Region), Ghana. Originally created as a district council in 1975. However, in 1988, it was split off into two new district assemblies: Sefwi-Wiawso District (capital: Wiawso), Juaboso-Bia District (capital: Juaboso) and Bibiani/Anhwiaso/Bekwai District (capital: Bibiani). The district council was located in the northern part of Western Region and had Wiawso as its capital town.
