= Bia East District =

District in Western North Region, Ghana

- District
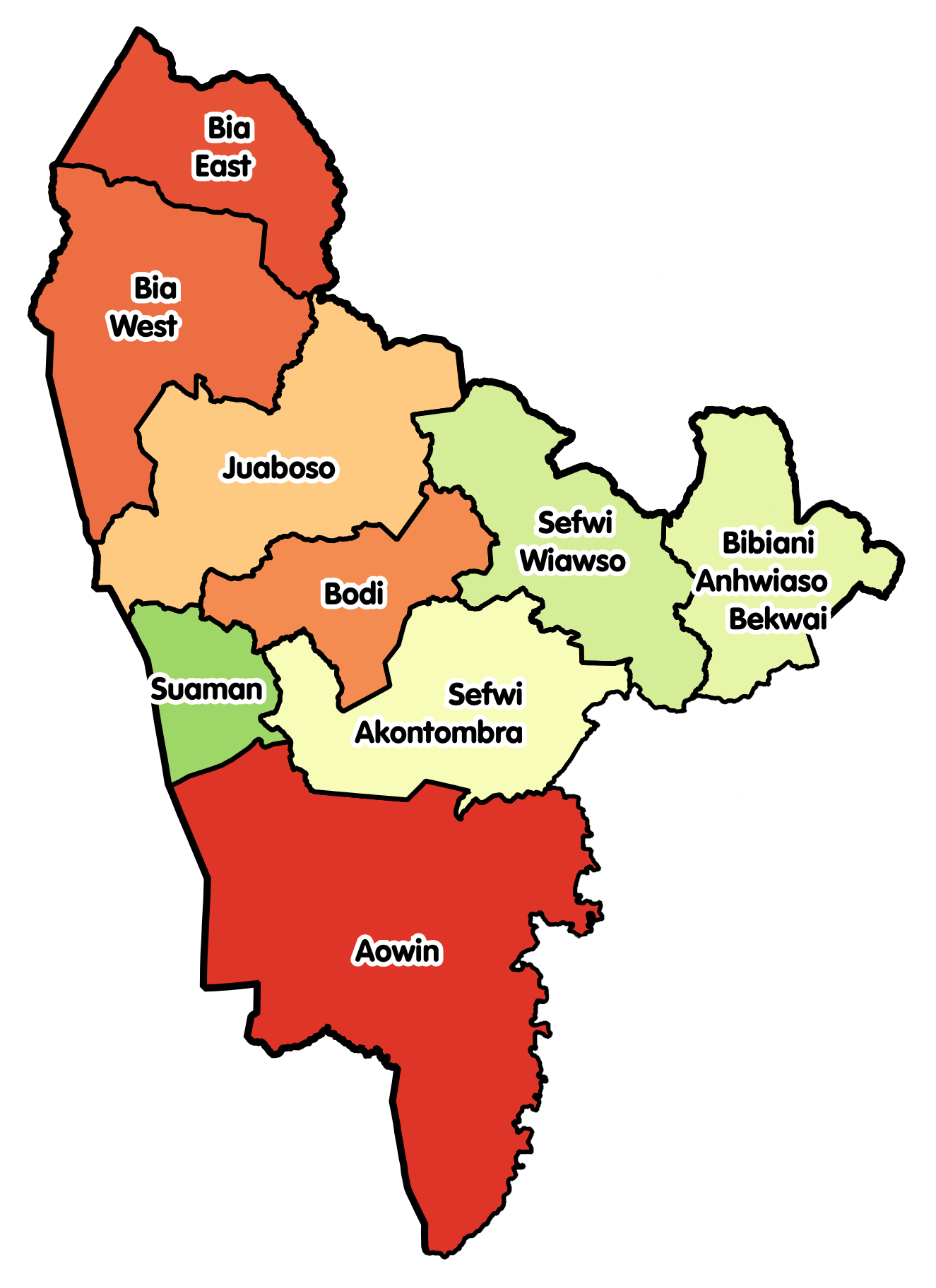
- Districts of Western North Region

- Location of Bia East District within Western North
- Coordinates: 6°49′17.76″N 3°1′10.2″W
- Country: Ghana
- Region: Western North
- Capital: Sefwi Adabokrom

Government
  - District Executive: Hon. Richard Chebure
  - Presiding Member: Hon. Joseph Apreku

Area
  - Total: 793.1 km^{2} (306.2 sq mi)

Population (2021 census)
  - Total: 53,073
  - Density: 66.92/km^{2} (173.3/sq mi)
- Time zone: UTC+0 (GMT)
- ISO 3166 code: GH-WN-BE

Bia East District is one of the nine districts in Western North Region, Ghana. It was formerly part of the then-larger Bia District until the Eastern part was split off in 2012 to form the Bia East District while the Western part was renamed as Bia West District. The district assembly is located in the northwest part of Western North Region and has Sefwi Adabokrom as its capital town. The larger Bia District was created from the former Sefwi-Bibiani District in 2004.

== Geography ==
Bia East District borders Dormaa District to the east, Asunafo North District to the north, Juabeso to the south and Bia West District to the west.
