= Juaboso District =

District in Western North Region, Ghana

- District
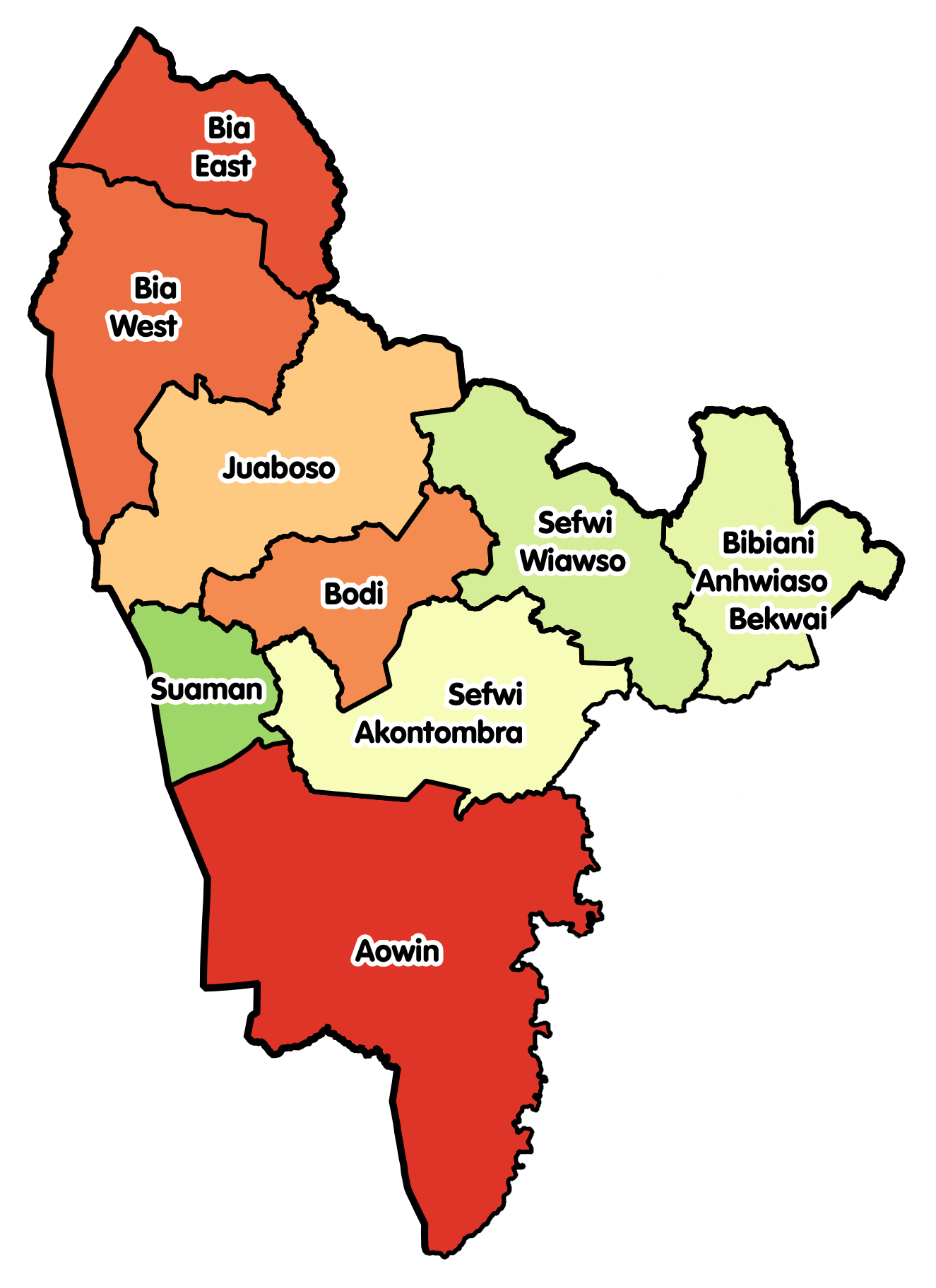
- Districts of Western North Region

- Location of Juaboso District within Western North
- Coordinates: 6°20′25.08″N 2°49′29.64″W
- Country: Ghana
- Region: Western North
- Capital: Juaboso

Government
  - District Executive: Martha Kwayie Manu

Area
  - Total: 1,369.9 km^{2} (528.9 sq mi)

Population (2021)
  - Total: 88,814
  - Density: 64.832/km^{2} (167.92/sq mi)
- Time zone: UTC+0 (GMT)
- ISO 3166 code: GH-WN-JU

Juaboso District is one of the nine districts in Western North Region, Ghana. Originally it was formerly part of the then-larger Juaboso-Bodi District in August 2004, which was created from the former Sefwi-Bibiani District Council, until the southeast part of the district was split off to create Bodi District on 28 June 2012; thus the remaining part has been renamed as Juaboso District. The district assembly is located in the northwest part of Western North Region and has Juaboso as its capital town.

== Juaboso City ==
It is about 65 kilometers northwest of the district capital Wiawso. It is also 360 kilometers northwest of Takoradi on the Atlantic Ocean coast and 225 kilometres south west of Kumasi, capital of the Ashanti Region.

== Geography ==
Juaboso District lies between latitude 6° 6'N and 7°N, and longitude 2°40'W and 3°15'W. To the north are the Bia East, Bia West and Asunafo North Municipal Districts. Its eastern neighbours are the Asunafo South and Bodi Districts. The Suaman District lies south and the La Cote d’Ivoire is to the west.

== Sub-district structures ==
Juaboso District has four area councils: Kofikrom-Proso, Asempaneye, Benchema-Nkatieso and Boinzan.

== Demographics ==
The population based on the 2021 population census is 88,814
