= Essam, Ghana =

Essam
- District Capital
- Location in Ghana
- Coordinates: 6°40′N 3°6′W
- Country: Ghana
- Region: Western North Region
- District: Bia West District
- Elevation: 177 m (581 ft)

Essam is a small town and is the capital of Bia West District, a district in the Western North Region of Ghana. The people there are mainly Sefwi people and their common language is the Sefwi language. The people there are mostly farmers
