= Bia West District =

District in Western North Region, Ghana

- District
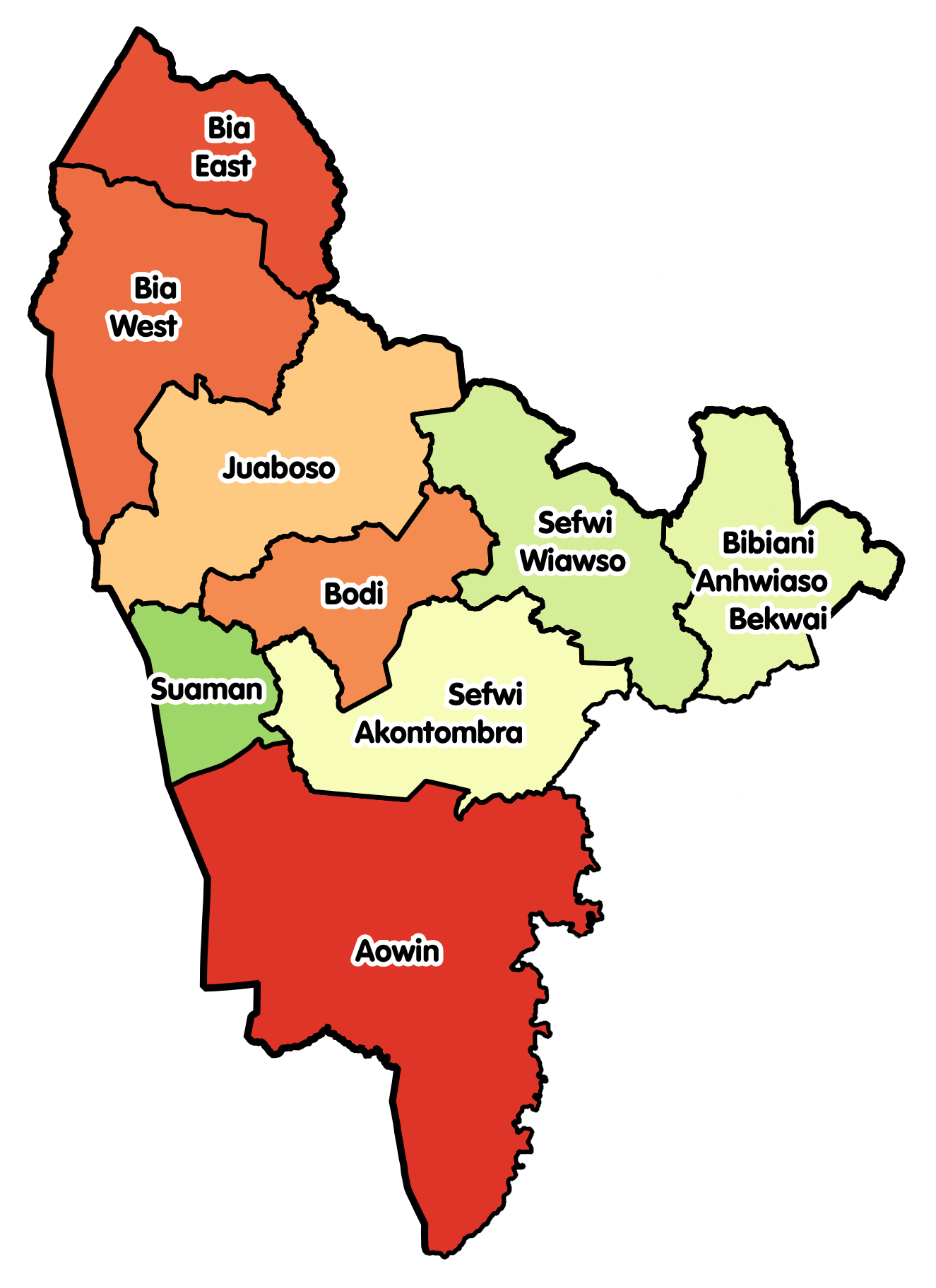
- Districts of Western North Region

- Location of Bia West District within Western North
- Coordinates: 6°29′2.4″N 3°4′58.8″W
- Country: Ghana
- Region: Western North
- Capital: Sefwi Essam

Government
  - District Executive: Hon. Mathew Annor

Area
  - Total: 1,342 km^{2} (518 sq mi)

Population (2021 census)
  - Total: 115,881
  - Density: 86.35/km^{2} (223.6/sq mi)
- Time zone: UTC+0 (GMT)
- ISO 3166 code: GH-WN-BW

Bia West District is one of the nine districts in Western North Region, Ghana. Originally it was formerly part of the then-larger Bia District in August 2004, which was created from the former Sefwi-Bibiani District Council, until the northeast part of the district was split off to create Bia East District on 28 June 2012; thus the remaining part has been renamed as Bia West District. The district assembly is located in the northwest part of Western North Region and has Sefwi Essam as its capital town.

== Sources ==
- "Districts of Ghana". Statoids.
- Bia West District
