= Sefwi Akontombra =

- District Capital
- Location in Ghana
- Coordinates: 6°2′8″N 2°52′30″W
- Country: Ghana
- Region: Western North Region
- District: Sefwi Akontombra District
- Elevation: 60 m (200 ft)
- Time zone: GMT
  - Summer (DST): GMT

Sefwi Akontombra is a small town and is the capital of Sefwi Akontombra district, a district in the Western North Region of Ghana.
