= Bibiani/Anhwiaso/Bekwai Municipal District =

District in Western North Region, Ghana

- District
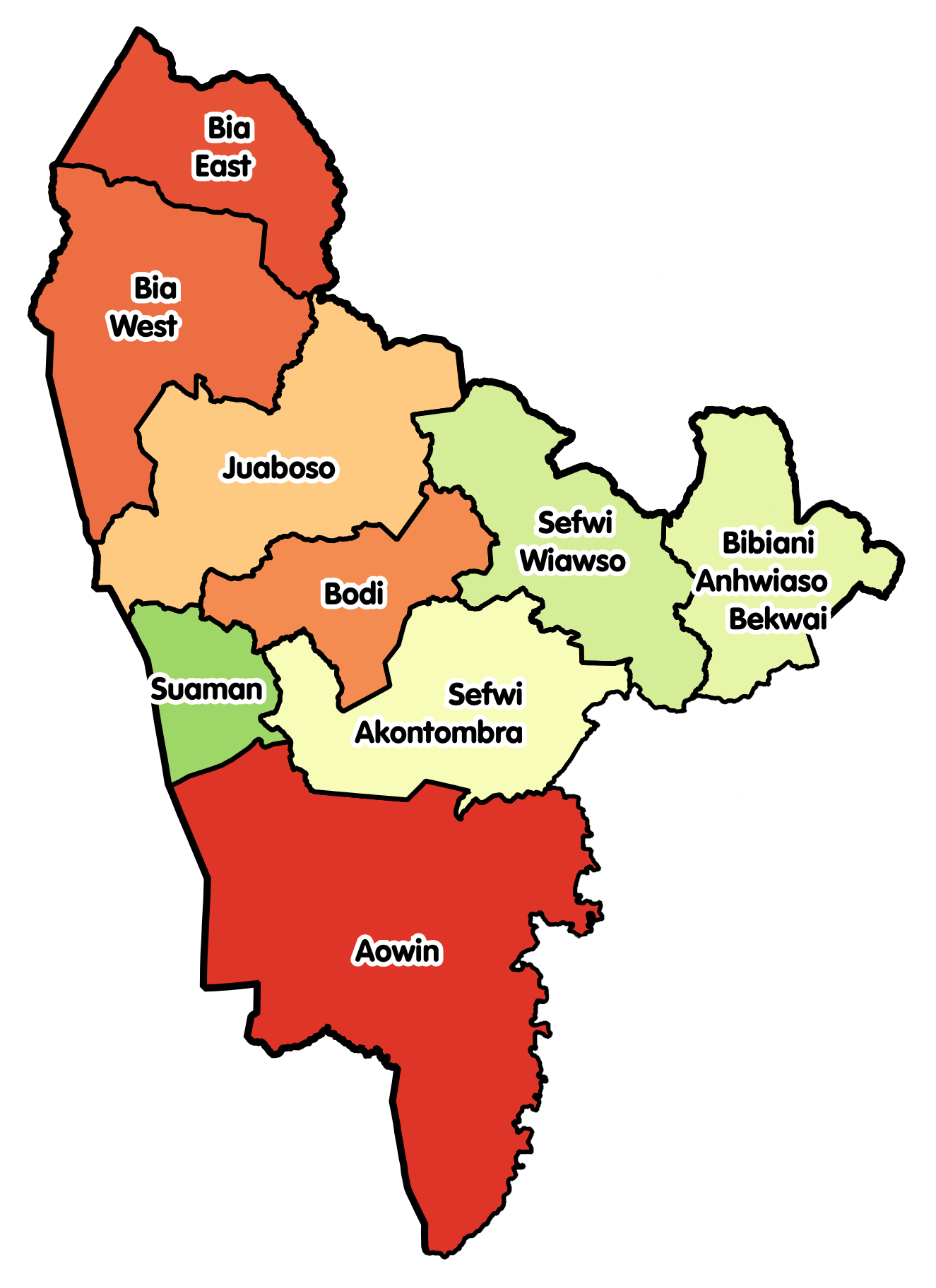
- Districts of Western North Region

- Location of Bibiani/Anhwiaso/Bekwai Municipal District within Western North
- Coordinates: 6°8′2.4″N 2°13′8.4″W
- Country: Ghana
- Region: Western North
- Capital: Bibiani

Government
  - Municipal Chief Executive: Hon. Adansi Bonah

Area
  - Total: 831.1 km^{2} (320.9 sq mi)

Population (2021 census)
  - Total: 167,971
  - Density: 202.1/km^{2} (523.5/sq mi)
- Time zone: UTC+0 (GMT)
- ISO 3166 code: GH-WN-BA

Bibiani/Anhwiaso/Bekwai Municipal District is one of the nine districts in Western North Region, Ghana. Originally created as an ordinary district assembly in 1988 when it was known as Bibiani/Anhwiaso/Bekwai District, which it was later elevated to municipal district assembly status in March 2012 to become Bibiani/Anhwiaso/Bekwai Municipal District. The municipality is located in the northeast part of Western North Region and has Bibiani as its capital town.

== Sources ==
- "Districts of Ghana". Statoids.
