= Sefwi people =

Ethnic group in Ghana

Sefwi
Total population
- 305,000

Regions with significant populations
- Western North Region

Languages
- Sefwi, French, English

Religion
- Akan religion, Christianity

Related ethnic groups
- Other Akans, especially Anyi, Baoulé, and Chakosi

The Sefwi are an Akan people.

The Akan sub-group live predominantly in Western North Region of Ghana. The Akan sub-group speak the Akan dialect Sefwi language.

The term Sefwi, which refers to the language spoken and the Sefwi people mythically originated from the withering of the Twi phrase, "Asa awie" which translates "War is over", by immigrants from Bono-Techiman, Wenchi, Adanse, Denkyira, Assin, and Asante who settled on the territories of Aowin (modern-day Sefwi) escaping the 17th century wars.

Geographically located on the Western North Region, Sefwi is about 200 kilometers from the coast, and covers an area of 2,695 square miles crossed by the Tano and Bia rivers.

The Sefwi like other Akan tribes originated from the ancient world; Northern part of modern Africa. Through wars many families forced their ways out to live in their present domains. For example, Obumangama of Sefwi Wiawso was told to have established his domain at Ewiaso because of its strategical position. Evidence suggests that by the end of the 17th century, Aowin's ambition to expand economically and politically led to confrontations with a strong new forces that try to control the trade routes and gold sources around 1715. This made Aowins eventually lose much of their territory to the new forces. New immigrants were victorious in their wars. They settled with many of their captives such as Aowin. This reveals why their language is seemly influenced by their closed tribes such as Bono, Wassa, Ahanta, Asante. Many of the families of Sefwi also stayed at different places among other tribes such as Adanse, Denkyira, and Asante, Bono, Aowin, Nzima before they finally settled at their new environment. Through these different staying at different places many of the Sefwi trace their origins from the immediate past where their memory can recall. For example, many of the families that trace their root to Denkyira, also classify themselves as Agona Royals.

Sefwi, collectively is made up of three traditional states namely Anhwiaso, Bekwai, and Wiawso, all of which have a mutually independent paramount chief and share a common deity Sobore and a common yam festival called Alluolue or Elue.

With a total population of about 880,231 (2021), Sefwi has 7 Districts and 7 Constituencies, comprising Bia West, Bia East, Bibiani/Anhwiaso/Bekwai, Bodi, Juabuso, Sefwi Akontombra and Sefwi Wiawso.

Sefwi is endowed with natural resources such as gold, bauxite and timber. The fertile nature of the land, has served as bait for farmers from other regions mostly Northern, Krobo and Ashanti. With cocoa farming as the main occupation of the people, Sefwi produces about 2/3 of Ghana's cocoa. Sefwi Wiawso, Asanwinso, Bibiani, and Sefwi Bekwai are the largest townships within the Sefwi land.
