= Bodi District =

District in Western North Region, Ghana

- District
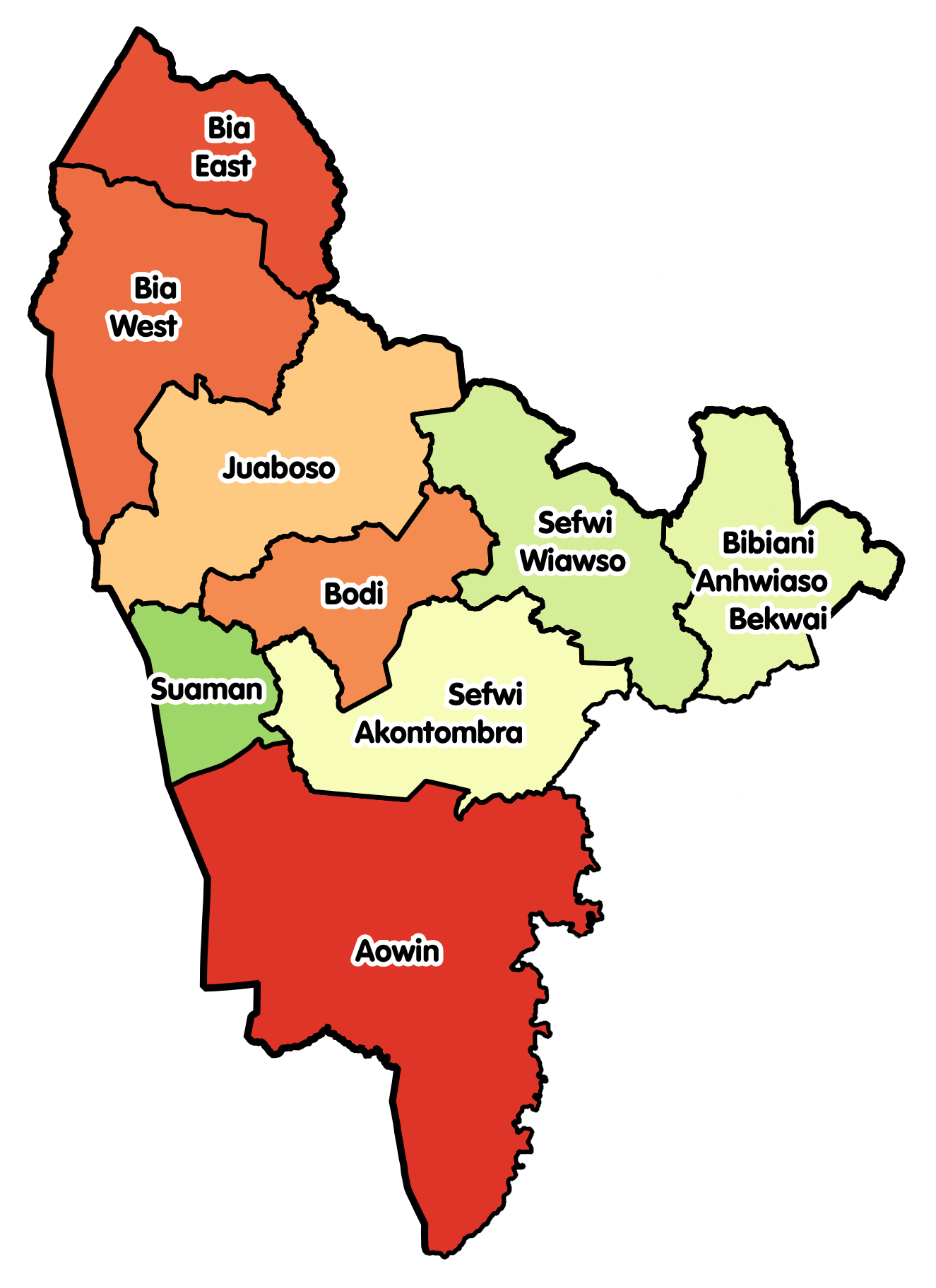
- Districts of Western North Region

- Location of Bodi District within Western North
- Coordinates: 6°13′12″N 2°45′11.88″W
- Country: Ghana
- Region: Western North
- Capital: Bodi

Area
  - Total: 678.1 km^{2} (261.8 sq mi)

Population (2021 census)
  - Total: 65,748
  - Density: 96.96/km^{2} (251.1/sq mi)
- Time zone: UTC+0 (GMT)
- ISO 3166 code: GH-WN-BD

Bodi District is one of the nine districts in Western North Region, Ghana. Originally it was formerly part of the then-larger Juaboso-Bodi District in August 2004, until the southeast part of the district was split off to create Bodi District on 28 June 2012; thus the remaining part has been renamed as Juaboso District. The district assembly is located in the northwest part of Western North Region and has Bodi as its capital town.
