= Juaboso =

- District Capital
- Location in Ghana
- Coordinates: 6°20′N 2°50′W
- Country: Ghana
- Region: Western North Region
- District: Juabeso District
- Elevation: 172 m (564 ft)
- Time zone: GMT
  - Summer (DST): GMT

Juaboso is a small town and is the capital of Juabeso district, a district in the Western North Region of Ghana.
