= Bibiani =

- Town & District Capital
- Location of Bibiani in Western North Region
- Coordinates: 6°13′0″N 2°21′0″W
- Country: Ghana
- Region: Western North Region
- District: Bibiani / Anhwiaso / Bekwai
- Elevation: 850 ft (260 m)

Population (2013)
  - Total: 21,583
- Time zone: Greenwich Mean Time
  - Summer (DST): GMT

Bibiani is a town and capital of the Bibiani/Anhwiaso/Bekwai Municipal Assembly, a district within the Western North Region of Ghana.

== Bibiani Gold Project ==
The Bibiani gold project is an ongoing underground mine development being developed by Asante Gold, based in Canada. Its first production is expected to be reached in late-2025.
