= Western North Region =

Region of Ghana

Coordinates: 6°18′N 2°48′W

Western North region Région du Nord-Ouest
- Region
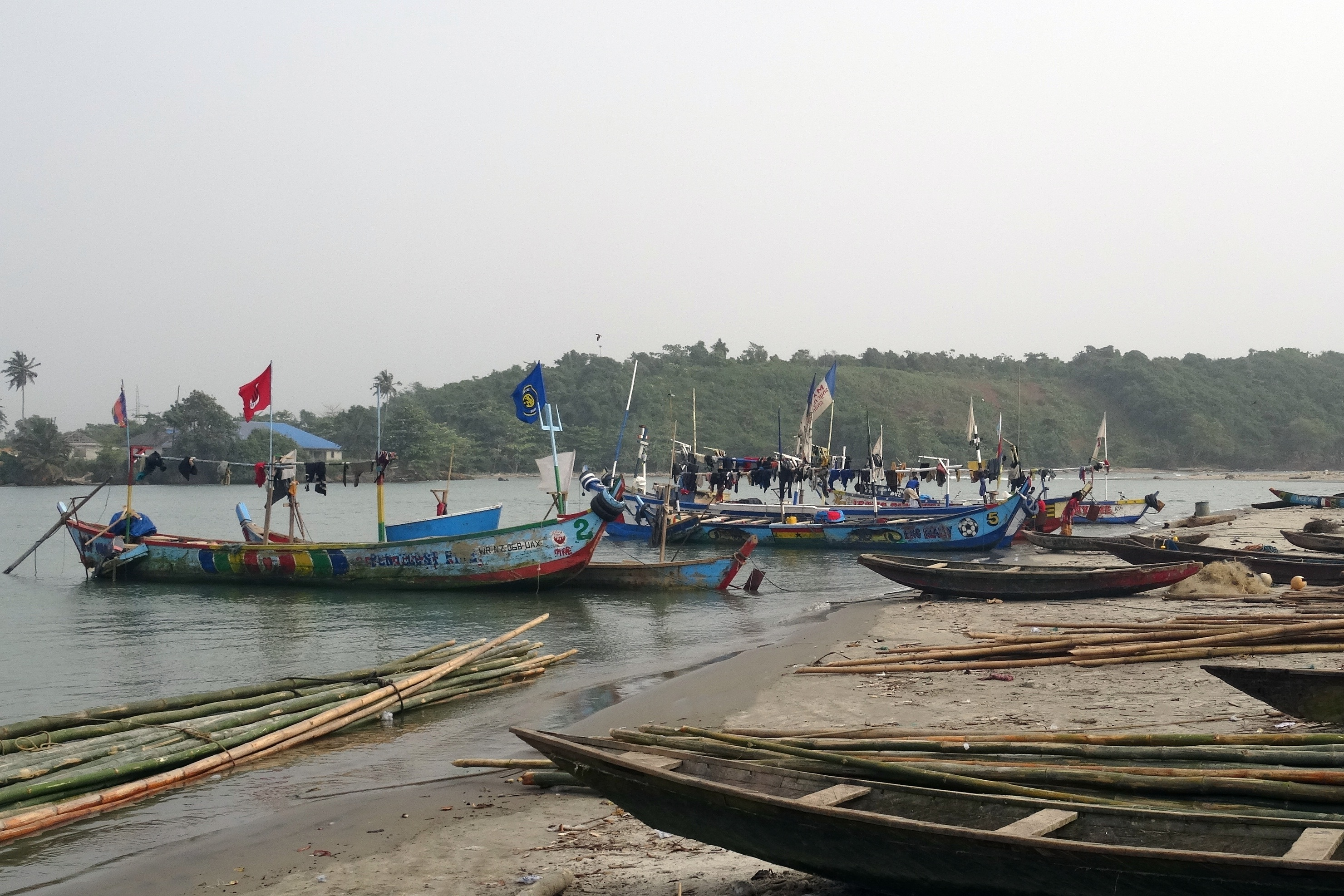
- Fishing Boats on the Ankobra River

- Location of Western North region in Ghana
- Country: Ghana
- Capital: Wiawso
- Districts: 9

Government
  - Regional Minister: Wilbert Petty Brentum

Area
  - Total: 10,079 km^{2} (3,892 sq mi)

Population (2021 census)
  - Total: 880,921
- Time zone: GMT
- Area code: 031

The Western North region is one of the six new regions of Ghana created in 2019. The region is bounded by the Ivory Coast (Comoé District) on the west, the Central region in the southeast, and the Ashanti, Ahafo, Bono East and Bono regions in the north. The Western North region has the highest rainfall in Ghana, lush green hills, and fertile soils. There are numerous small and large-scale gold mines companies in the region. The ethnic culture of the region is dominated by the Sefwi . The main languages spoken are Sefwi, Akan, French and English.

== History ==
The Western North region is a new region carved out of the existing Western region of Ghana. This creation of this new region was in fulfillment of a promise made by the New Patriotic Party prior to the 2016 Ghana general election. Upon winning the elections, the president, Nana Akuffo Addo created the Ministry of Regional Reorganization to oversee policy formulation and implementation. In all, six new regions were created from the existing ten regions of Ghana. The other new regions are Bono East, Ahafo, Savannah, North East, and Oti regions.

The execution of plans for the creation of the regions was ceded to the newly created Ministry of Regional Reorganization and Development which is under the leadership of Hon. Dan Botwe. In March 2017, the ministry sent the blueprint for the creation of the region along with others to the Council of State. The council met over 36 times from the time of submission to August 2017. The final stage for the creation of the region was decided through a referendum by the people within the area of the new region on 27 December 2018.

== Health ==
In August 2021, the region recorded an outbreak of H5N1 avian influenza.

== Administrative divisions ==
The political administration of the region is through the local government system. Under this administration system, the region is divided into nine MMDA's (made up of 0 Metropolitan, 3 Municipal and 6 Ordinary Assemblies). Each district, municipal or metropolitan assembly is administered by a chief executive, representing the central government but deriving authority from an assembly headed by a presiding member elected from among the members themselves. The current list is as follows:

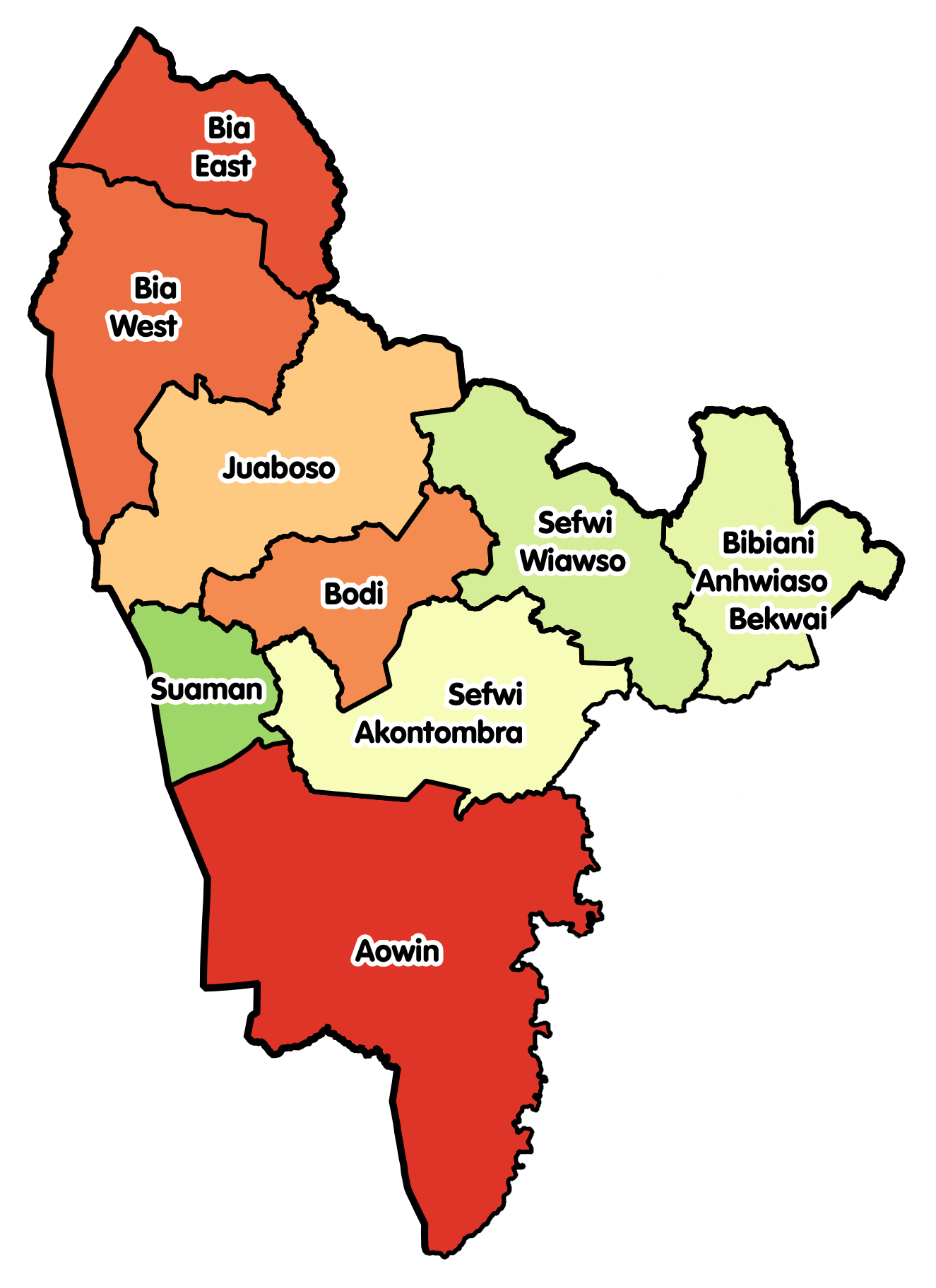
Districts of the Western North region

Districts of the Western North region
#	MMDA name	Capital	MMDA type	Population census 2010	Population 2019 projected
1	Aowin	Enchi	Municipal	117,886	154,661
2	Bia East	Adabokrom	Ordinary	27,393	37,108
3	Bia West	Essam	Ordinary	88,939	111,355
4	Bibiani/Anhwiaso/Bekwai	Bibiani	Municipal	123,272	160,844
5	Bodi	Bodi	Ordinary	53,314	68,055
6	Juaboso	Juaboso	Ordinary	58,435	77,678
7	Sefwi-Akontombra	Sefwi Akontombra	Ordinary	82,467	108,266
8	Sefwi-Wiawso	Wiawso	Municipal	139,200	182,510
9	Suaman	Dadieso	Ordinary	20,529	27,832
Total				658,835	928,309
