= Wasa people =

Ethnic group in Ghana

Wasa
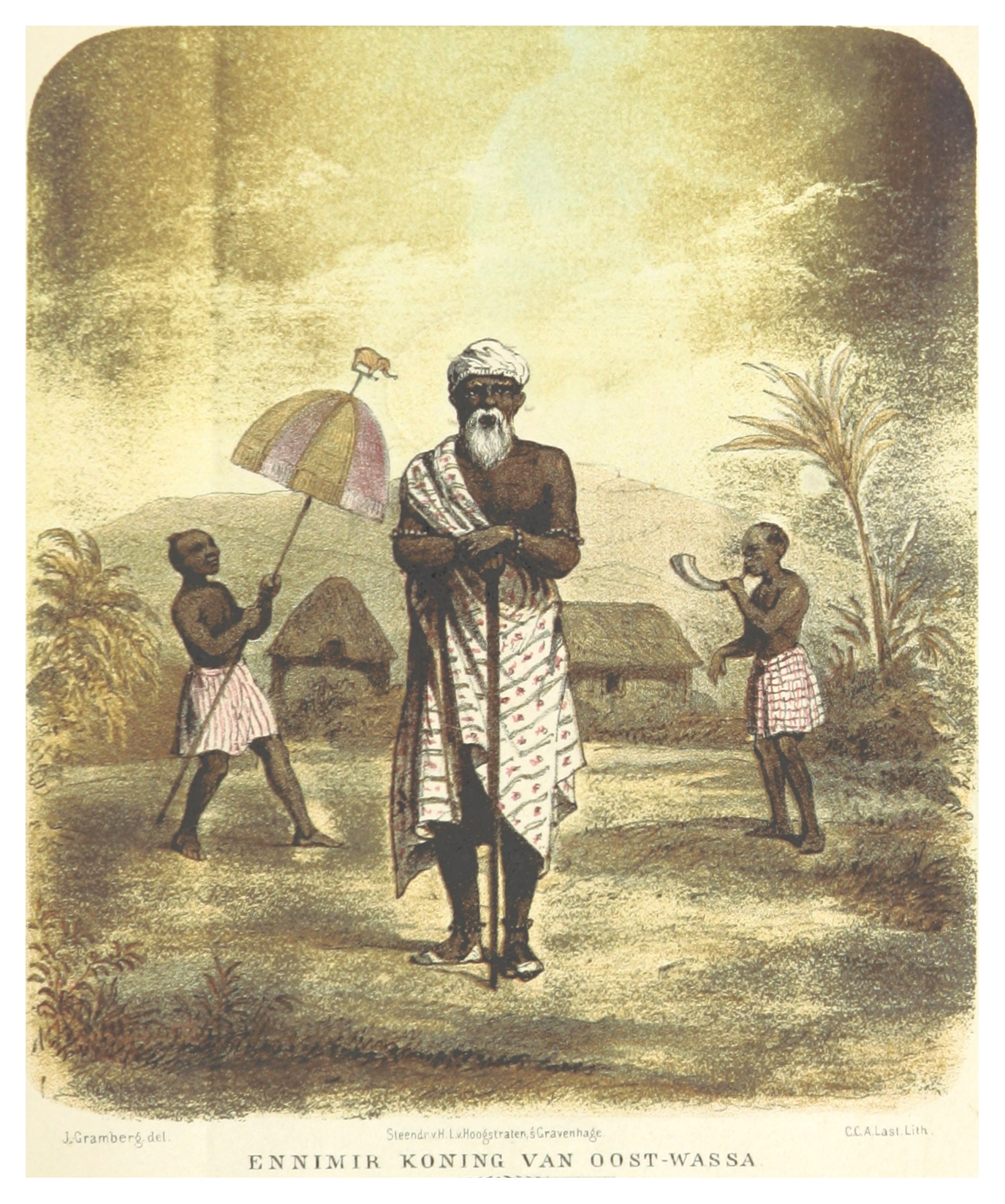
- Ennimir, a King of the Wasa (by Gramberg, Litho. 1861)

Total population
- About 1,890,1045

Regions with significant populations
- Western Region of Ghana

Languages
- Wassa Twi, English, Fante Twi

Religion
- Christianity, African Traditional Religion

Related ethnic groups
- Akan

The Wasa (or Wassa) is an Akan ethnic group predominantly inhabiting the Western Region of Ghana. Organized under the historic Wassa Traditional Area, they are renowned for their rich cultural heritage, gold resources, and agricultural contributions to Ghana’s economy.

== Geography and administrative districts ==
The Wassa traditional area spans approximately 9,638 square kilometers, making it one of the largest ethnic territories in Ghana. It is comparable in size to the Central Region (9,826 km²) and constitutes a significant portion of the Western Region, which now covers 14,293 km² after administrative reorganization.

Administratively, the Wassa territory is divided into seven municipal and district assemblies:

Districts of the Wassa Areas
#	MMDA name	Capital	MMDA type	Population census 2010	Population projection 2019
1	Tarkwa-Nsuaem	Tarkwa	Municipal	90,477	117,550
2	Prestea-Huni Valley	Bogoso	Municipal	159,304	207,237
3	Mpohor	Mpohor	Ordinary	42,923	55,678
4	Wassa Amenfi Central	Manso Amenfi	Ordinary	69,014	89,703
5	Wassa Amenfi East	Wassa-Akropong	Municipal	83,478	108,272
6	Wassa Amenfi West	Asankragua	Municipal	92,152	120,643
7	Wassa East	Daboase	Ordinary	81,073	105,163
Total				618,421	1,890,046

These districts are situated within the Western Region of Ghana and are characterized by tropical rainforests, fertile valleys, and mineral-rich landscapes. Wassa remains the largest ethnic group in the Western Region in terms of both land area and population.

== Culture and traditions ==
The Wassa people have a rich tradition of music and dance, with instruments like the djembe, kora, and fontomfrom drums being used to accompany traditional dances.

The Wassa people are renowned by many for their expertise in woodcarving and goldwork. They create intricate wooden carvings and gold ornaments that are highly prized among collectors.

The Wassa people wear traditional clothing made from colorful kente cloth, which is woven with symbolic patterns and designs.

The Wassa people celebrate several festivals throughout the year, including the Wassa Akwasidae festival, which honors the ancestors and gods.

In Wassa culture, elders are highly respected for their wisdom, knowledge, and life experience. Children are taught to show deference to their elders and seek their guidance

Wassa culture places a strong emphasis on community and social bonding. Extended family ties are important, and community members often come together to celebrate special occasions or support one another in times of need.

== Pre-Colonial Era ==
The Wassa people established a significant presence in the region, leveraging their strategic location along trade routes to exchange gold with European merchants. They maintained their autonomy during the expansion of neighboring empires, such as the Ashanti Empire.

== Colonial and Modern Governance ==
During British colonization, the Wassa Traditional Area became part of the Gold Coast. Today, governance blends traditional chieftaincy, led by the Omanhene (paramount chief), with modern district assemblies. The Wassa Traditional Area is divided into Wassa Amenfi and Wassa Fiase.

== Natural Resources and Economy ==
=== Gold Mining ===
The Wassa lands are central to Ghana’s gold industry, hosting major mining operations in towns like Tarkwa, Bogoso, Akyempim, and Prestea. Artisanal and small-scale mining, known locally as "galamsey," is widespread but has led to environmental challenges, including land degradation and water pollution.

== Agriculture ==
The region is also known for its agricultural productivity, cultivating crops such as cocoa, oil palm, rubber, plantains, and cassava. Cocoa farming remains a key livelihood for many Wassa people, contributing significantly to Ghana's status as one of the world's leading cocoa producers.

== Environmental Challenges ==
Illegal mining activities have resulted in environmental degradation, including deforestation and pollution of water bodies like the Ankobra River. Efforts are underway to rehabilitate affected ecosystems and promote sustainable mining practices.

== Language and Identity ==
The Wassa speak the Wasa language, a dialect of the Akan language, which is closely related to other Central Tano languages. Despite external influences, the Wassa have preserved their linguistic heritage, with Wasa being the primary language spoken in their communities.

== Traditional Governance ==
The Wassa people maintain a traditional governance system led by the Omanhene, who oversees customary laws and land disputes. This system operates alongside elected district officials, with communal lands managed by chiefs and family heads.

== Contemporary Issues ==
- Land Rights: Conflicts have arisen between mining companies, small-scale miners, and farmers over access to land and resources. These disputes highlight the need for clear land tenure policies and sustainable resource management.
- Urbanization: Towns like Wassa-Akropong have experienced rapid growth due to mining activities, leading to infrastructural challenges and changes in social dynamics.
- Cultural Preservation: Globalization and youth migration pose threats to traditional practices. However, efforts by local leaders and organizations aim to promote cultural education and preserve the Wassa heritage.

== Notable Sites ==
- Tarkwa Gold Mines: One of Ghana’s largest industrial mining operations, contributing significantly to the national economy.
- Wassa Akyempim Gold Mine: Operated by Golden Star Resources is one of the mining companies on the wassa land.
- Ankobra River: A vital waterway historically used for trade and irrigation, now facing environmental challenges due to mining activities.
- Bonsa Tyre Plant: A rubber-processing factory located in the Wassa area, highlighting the region's industrial contributions beyond mining.
- Aboso Glass Factory: A glass manufacturing company set up by Kwame Nkrumah in 1966, was a major manufacturer and supplier of bottles for the beverage industry, among many other products.

== Notable people ==
- Kwame Yeboah (born 17 November 1977), is a Ghanaian musician, guitarist, keyboardist, producer, recording- engineer, and multi-instrumentalist.
