= Wassa achempim =

Town in Western Ghana

Akyempim Wassa Akyempim
- Town
- Interactive map of Akyempim
- Country: Ghana
- Region: Western Region
- District: Wassa East District

Government
  - Chief: Nana Okumfo Nuamah I

Population (2012)
  - Total: 1,000
- Time zone: GMT
  - Summer (DST): UTCn (GMT)
- Area code: 00233

Wassa Akyempim (Akyempim or Achempim) is a village and community in the Wassa East District of the Western Region of Ghana. It is part of a cluster of settlements in the Wassa area that are closely linked with gold mining activities and rural economic life in southwestern Ghana.

== Location and geography ==
Wassa Akyempim is located in the Wassa East District in the Western Region of Ghana. The community lies near other small settlements such as Old Subri, and is situated within a predominantly rural and mineral-rich part of the country.

== Community and population ==
As part of the Wassa East District, Akyempim is one of several small towns and villages that contribute to the district’s population and rural economy. Projections by the district assembly list Akyempim among the principal settlements, with population estimates of around 4,000 people in the early 2020s, reflecting gradual growth over the decade.

== Economy ==
The economy of Wassa Akyempim and surrounding areas is strongly influenced by mining, agriculture, and informal economic activities. The community lies within the operational area of the Wassa Gold Mine, a major mining project in the Western Region. The presence of mining operations has shaped employment, land use, and local economic debates.

== History and community relations ==
Multiple towns in the Wassa East District, including Akyempim, have a history of engagement and occasional tension with mining companies. For example, demonstrations have occurred when local youth and residents protested perceived failures by mining firms to employ local labor or to implement community benefit agreements.

In 2019, twelve communities in the Wassa area — including Akyempim — signed a Memorandum of Understanding (MoU) with Golden Star Wassa Mines to promote cooperation and local development in matters such as employment, contracts, and community projects.

== Contemporary issues ==
Wassa Akyempim has also been mentioned in reports of illegal mining (galamsey) activities in the Wassa East District. In 2024, an incident involving suspected illegal miners and a military officer occurred near the community, highlighting ongoing security and environmental concerns related to unauthorized mining operations.

== Culture and society ==
The Wassa East District is ruled by the Wassa Fiase Paramountcy, with offices in Tarkwa. It has eight divisions, each led by a chief. People live peacefully and respect each other’s cultures. The main ethnic group is Wassa, but Akan, Ewe, and Dagomba also live there. People speak Wassa, Twi, Fante, and Hausa. The Yam Festival, held between October and November, is an important cultural celebration.
