= Old Subri =

Town in Western Ghana

Old Subri Subri Dada
- Town
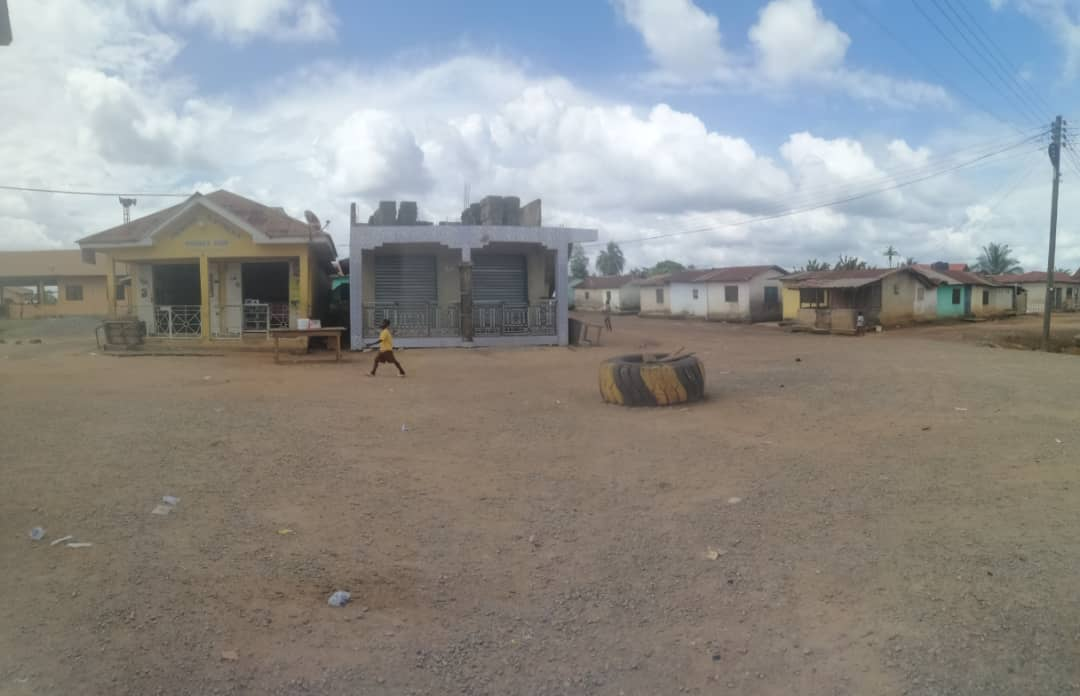
- Interactive map of Old Subri
- Country: Ghana
- Region: Western Region
- District: Wassa East District

Government
  - Chief: Nana Twumasi Ampaakwaw II

Population (2012)
  - Total: 1,000
- Time zone: GMT
  - Summer (DST): UTCn (GMT)
- Area code: 00233

Old Subri (Subri Dada) is a town in the western region of Ghana. The town is one of the catchment areas of the Golden Star Wassa Limited which is a mining company in Ghana. The people are part of the Wassa tribe.

== Projects ==
=== Water ===
The chiefs and residents of Old Subri in the Wassa East District of the Western Region in July 2023 received a community water project worth GH¢176,294.00 from Ghana Rubber Estate Limited (GREL). The chief mentioned that the timely assistance from companies like, Golden Star Resource, GREL, to consistently cater to community needs in their operational areas, had a significant positive impact on the host communities' lives.

The project includes a mechanized water system with two boreholes, three outlets, and a 20,000-liter capacity. This initiative aims to improve access to clean water for the local community. The community water project, started in 2021, faced a minor setback due to insufficient water from the first borehole. A supplementary borehole was added, and now it is expected to serve around 1,400 people in Old Subri, Western Region.

== Education ==
Peoples in the town and around can have their formal education at Old Subri D/A Basic School, a public school under the supervision of the district capital, Daboase.

== Traditional Leaders ==
=== Chief ===
Nana Twumasi Ampaakwaw II.

== Sports ==
=== Soccer Team ===
Royal Jet FC: A division two football team in Ghana.

== Controversies, Incidents and Lawsuits ==
=== Incidents ===
On Thursday evening, while the Royal Jet team members were on their route to Old Subri after experiencing a 2-0 loss to Tarkwa United, in a second division league match held at Akon Park, the Medeama SC home grounds in Tarkwa before the construction of the TnA Stadium by Goldfield Ghana Limited, the team experienced an accident. As a result of an unfortunate incident that occurred on the Huni Valley-Damang road, a number of individuals who are part of the roster of Royal Jet FC, a football team competing in the second division, and whose base is situated in the locale of Old Subri within the administrative jurisdiction of the Wassa East District in the Western Region, have unfortunately incurred substantial injuries.
