= Henry Antwi =

Australian researcher

Henry Antwi is an Australian-based mining engineer and mineral economist. He is a fellow of the Australasian Institute of Mining and Metallurgy (AusIMM) and the founder and sponsor of the Tarkwa Student Chapter of AusIMM at the University of Mines and Technology, Ghana.

== Biography ==
He attended Osei Tutu secondary school, Mfantsipim, and the UST School of Mines in Ghana. He continued his study in the Camborne School of Mines in England, where he earned a Bachelor's degree in engineering, and later attended the Colorado School of Mines in the United States to earn a Master's degree in engineering.

He obtained a Graduate Diploma in Business from Curtin University of Technology in Australia to diversify his studies.
