= Benjamin Kessie =

- Citizenship: Ghana
- Education: University of Cape Coast (Ba.Educ)
- Alma mater: University of Cape Coast, University of Media, Arts and Communication, University of Mines and Technology
- Occupations: Municipal Chief Executive, Tutor
- Employer: Tarkwa-Nsuaem Municipal District
- Predecessor: KD Asmah

Benjamin Kessie is a Ghanaian politician who was nominated by Nana Addo Dankwa for the position of Municipal Chief Executive for Tarkwa-Nsuaem.

== Early life and education ==
Kessie has a Bachelor of Education obtained in 2001, Masters Degree in Governance and Sustainable Development from the University of Cape Coast. He also earned a certificate in Marketing, Public Relations, and advertising from the Ghana Institute of Journalism in 2009 as well as a certificate in Safety and Management from the University of Mines and Technology in 2008.

== Career ==
Kessie was an Administrative Manager at Medeama Sporting Club, Public and Corporate Affairs Manager at Mospacka Group of Companies as well the Area Manager of PSI on Oil Palm, Ayiem. He also served as a circuit Facilitator of Community School Alliances at the USAID and as a tutor in various schools.

He nominated the Municipal Chief Executive for Tarkwa-Nsuaem where he replaced KD Asmah. Before, he served as a presiding member for the Tarkwa-Nsuaem Municipal Assembly and was also a three-time New Patriotic Party(NPP) Constituency Secretary.

== See also ==
- Nana Akufo-Ado
- Asamoah Obed
