= Aboso Glass Factory =

Glass company in Aboso, Ghana

Aboso Glass Factory is a glass company located in Aboso, a town near Tarkwa, which is the capital of Wassa West District, in the Western Region of Ghana.

== Controversy ==
The situation surrounding the Aboso Glass Factory highlights ongoing tensions regarding resource management and community involvement. The opposition by the youth to Linkin Birds Company accessing scraps from the factory suggests concerns about transparency, equitable benefits for locals, or potential environmental impacts.

Such disputes are common when decisions about local resources are made without sufficient community engagement, particularly when those resources hold economic or historical significance. GIHOC Distilleries Company, as a key stakeholder, might need to work closely with the community to address these concerns and ensure that any agreements are fair and mutually beneficial.

In a phone interview, Maxwell Kofi Jumah, Managing Director of GIHOC Distilleries Company, explained that the directive originated from a new investor and assured that only the scraps would be removed, with nothing else taken out.

The community, however, disputes this claim, stating that scraps are still being taken away. They allege that roofing sheets from the building have also been removed, and transformers powering the factory have been dismantled.

== History ==
The Aboso Glass Factory set up by Kwame Nkrumah in 1966, was a major manufacturer and supplier of bottles for the beverage industry, among many other products. Most of the employees were residents from Aboso and other neighbouring communities. The company was renamed as Tropical Glass Factory when it was handed over to Gilchrist Olympio. However due to financial constraints, the company collapsed. In 2003, Aboso Glass Factory was placed on a divestiture listing, after ECG ceased power supply for their works. The government in 2017 has announced plans of restoring the company to its former glory with the help of some investors. In 2019, GIHOC Distilleries Company Limited declared a takeover of the Aboso Glass Factory. Aboso youth in the Prestea Huni Valley Municipality of the Western Region to hit the streets if there are no signs of revising glass factory.
