= Awudua =

Community in Western Region, Ghana

- Country: Ghana
- Region: Western Region
- District: Prestea Huni-Valley Municipality

Awudua is a town near Tarkwa in the Prestea Huni-Valley Municipality in the Western Region of Ghana. The chief of the area is Nana Kobina Angu II.

== Institution ==
- Awudua Nkwanta Anglican Basic School
- Awudua Health Centre

== Notable native ==
- Deaconess Margaret Badu Tobbin, mother of Nana Amo Tobbin I (Executive Chairman of Tobinco Group of Companies)
