= Bentil Godfred Henry =

Ghanaian politician and Member of Parliament for Mpohor Constituency

Hon. Bentil Godfred Henry

Member of Parliament for Mpohor Constituency
- Incumbent
- Assumed office 7 January 2025
- President: John Dramani Mahama
- Preceded by: John Sanie

Personal details
- Born: November 14, 1988 (age 37) Mpohor, Western Region, Ghana
- Party: National Democratic Congress (NDC)
- Education: University for Development Studies; Ghana Institute of Management and Public Administration (GIMPA)
- Profession: Politician, Development Consultant
- Committees: Environment, Science and Technology Committee – Member; Backbenchers' Business Committee – Member

Bentil Godfred Henry (born 14 November 1988) is a Ghanaian politician and Member of Parliament for the Mpohor Constituency in the Western Region of Ghana. He was elected in the 2024 general election on the ticket of the National Democratic Congress (NDC), defeating the incumbent John Kobina Abbam Aboah Sanie of the New Patriotic Party (NPP), who had represented the constituency since 2017.

== Early life and education ==
Bentil Godfred Henry was born on 14 November 1988. He hails from Mpohor in the Western Region of Ghana. He holds a bachelor's degree in development studies and a master's in public administration.

== Political career ==
Henry began his political career within the National Democratic Congress (NDC) and contested the Mpohor parliamentary seat in the 2024 general election. He was elected with 11,680 votes, defeating the incumbent, John Kobina Abbam Aboah Sanie of the New Patriotic Party (NPP), who received 8,299 votes. His election marked the end of a 16-year period of NPP representation in the constituency.

== Parliamentary committees ==
As of 2025, Henry serves on Environment, Science and Technology Committee and Backbenchers' Business Committee
