= Albert Kwaku Obbin =

Ghanaian politician

- Preceded by: Kweku Acheampong Bonful

MP for Prestea Huni Valley
- In office 7 January 2001 – 6 January 2009
- President: John Kufuor
- Succeeded by: Francis Adu-Blay Koffie

Personal details
- Born: 4 May 1956 (age 70)
- Party: New Patriotic Party
- Education: University of Education Winneba, University of Cape Coast, Ghana Institute of Management and Public Administration
- Occupation: Politician

Albert Kwaku Obbin (born 4 May 1956) was a Ghanaian politician and a former member of parliament for the Prestea-Huni Valley constituency in the Western region of Ghana.

== Early life and education ==
Obbin was born in 1956. He obtained a diploma in Social studies from the University of Education, Winneba, a bachelor's degree in Education in Social science from the University of Cape Coast and an Executive Masters in Governance and Leadership from the Ghana Institute of Management and Public Administration.

== Politics ==
Obbin began his political career in 2000 after winning the parliamentary seat of Prestea-Huni Valley in 2000 general elections and becoming a member of parliament of the third and fourth parliament of the fourth Republic of Ghana. He won the Prestea-Huni Valley constituency in 2000 and 2004 on the ticket of the New Patriotic Party.

In 2000, he won the seat with 19,131 votes out of 39,487 valid votes cast, getting 48.40% out of 100%. His constituency was a part of the 9 parliamentary seats out of 19 seats won by the New Patriotic Party in that election for the Western Region of Ghana. The New Patriotic Party won a majority total of 99 parliamentary seats out of 200 seats.

He was elected over Kweku Acheampong Bonful of the National Democratic Congress, Mubashir Tamiru Dari of the Convention People's Party and Akosua Wirekowah of the Peoples National Convention. These respectively obtained 12,240, 7,154 and 962 votes out of the total valid votes. These were equivalent to 31.00%, 18.10% and 2.40% respectively, out of the total valid votes.

In 2004, he won the seat with 23,852 votes out of 54,536 valid votes cast, getting 43.70% out of 100%. During the 2008 elections, he lost his seat to Francis Adu-Blay Koffie. Obbin had a total of 18,077 out of 52,815 valid votes cast, whiles Koffie won the seat with 21,887 out of 52,815 valid votes cast. Obbin did not contest in the 2012 elections.

== Personal life ==
Obbin is a Christian.
