= Tarkwa Senior High School =

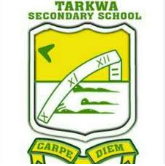

Location
- P. O. Box 47 Tarkwa, Western Region; Ghana
- 5°17′30″N 2°00′14″W

Information
- Type: Public high school
- Motto: Carpe Diem (Seize The Opportunity) [sic]
- Established: 1961 (65 years ago)
- Founder: Kwame Nkrumah
- Status: Active
- School district: Tarkwa-Nsuaem Municipal District
- Oversight: Ministry of Education
- Gender: Coed
- Age: 14 to 18
- Classes offered: Business, general arts, general science, visual arts
- Houses: 9

Tarkwa Senior High School is a co-educational senior high school in the mining town of Tarkwa in the Western Region of Ghana.

== History ==
The school was founded in 1961 by the first president of Ghana, Dr. Kwame Nkrumah, under the accelerated Development Plan for Education when Ghana attained independence.

== Houses ==
The school has a total of eight houses (four for boys and four for girls).

Houses	Boys'	Girls'
Bolsover	Ama Saa	
Fabil	Nightingale	
Sarbah	Yaa Asantewaa	
Aggrey	Nyaniba	

== Courses ==
- General Science
- General Arts
- Business
- Visual Arts
- Home Economics
- Agricultural Science

== Notable alumni ==
- Kwesi Amoako Atta - Ghanaian lawyer and politician
- Kwame Dzokoto - Ghanaian actor and comedian

== See also ==
- Education in Ghana
- List of senior high schools in Ghana
