= Isaac Mensah =

Isaac Mensah may refer to:

- Isaac Mensah (footballer, born 2002), Ghanaian football forward
- Isaac Mensah (footballer, born 1995), Ghanaian football midfielder
- Isaac Adjei Mensah, Ghanaian politician
- Isaac Lawrence Kumaning Mensah, Ghanaian politician
