= Emmanuel Appiah =

Emmanuel Appiah may refer to:

- Emmanuel Appiah (entrepreneur) (born 1987), Ghanaian entrepreneur
- Emmanuel Appiah (footballer) (born 1993), Ghanaian footballer
