= Mpohor (Ghana parliament constituency) =

Constituency in Ghana

- constituency for the Parliament of Ghana
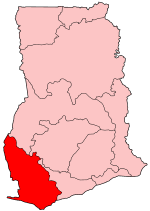
- District: Mpohor District
- Region: Western Region of Ghana

Current constituency
- Party: National Democratic Congress
- MP: Bentil Godfred Henry

Mpohor is one of the constituencies represented in the Parliament of Ghana. It elects one Member of Parliament (MP) by the first past the post system of election. Hon. Bentil Godfred Henry is the member of parliament for the constituency. Mpohor is located in the Mpohor District of the Western Region of Ghana.

== Members of Parliament ==
Election	Member	Party
2020	John Kobina Abbam Aboah Sanie	New Patriotic Party
2016	Alex Kofi Agyekum	New Patriotic Party
