= Wassa East (Ghana parliament constituency) =

Constituency in Ghana

Mpohor
- constituency for the Parliament of Ghana
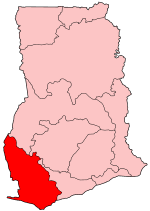
- District: Mpohor/Wassa East District
- Region: Western Region of Ghana

Current constituency
- Party: National Democratic Congress
- MP: Hon. Isaac Adjei Mensah

Wassa East is one of the constituencies represented in the Parliament of Ghana. It elects one Member of Parliament (MP) by the first past the post system of election. Wassa East is located in the Mpohor/Wassa East District of the Western Region of Ghana.

== Members of Parliament ==
Election	Member	Party
2016	Isaac Adjei Mensah	National Democratic Congress
