= Mpohor/Wassa East District =

Former district in Western region, Ghana

- Former District
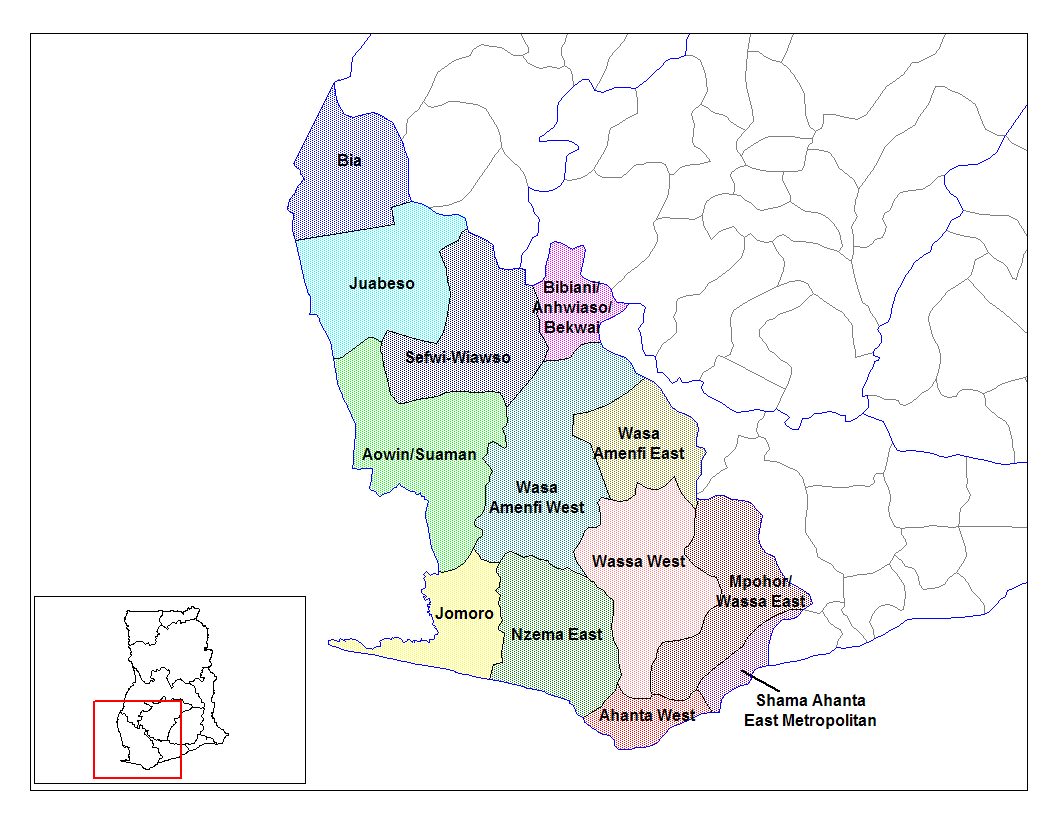
- Districts of Western Region

- Location of Mpohor/Wassa East District within Western
- Coordinates: 5°8′19.32″N 1°39′36″W
- Country: Ghana
- Region: Western
- Capital: Daboase
- Time zone: UTC+0 (GMT)
- ISO 3166 code: GH-WP-MW

Mpohor/Wassa East District is a former district that was located in Western Region, Ghana. Originally created as an ordinary district assembly in 1988, which was created from the former Wassa-Fiase-Mpohor District Council. However, on 28 June 2012, it was split off into two new districts: Wassa East District (capital: Daboase) and Mpohor District (capital: Mpohor). The municipality was located in the eastern part of Western Region and had Daboase as its capital town.
