= Akotom =

- Town
- Location within Ghana
- Coordinates: 5°28′0″N 1°58′0″W
- Country: Ghana
- Region: Western Region
- District: Prestea-Huni Valley District
- Elevation: 289 ft (88 m)
- Time zone: GMT
  - Summer (DST): GMT

Akotom (mostly referred to as Afamase Akotom) is a small town found in Prestea Huni Valley Municipality in the Western Region of Ghana. In 2018, an ultra-modern borehole was commissioned by Toyota Ghana Company Limited at Afamasi Akotom School.
