= Bawdie Arboretum Reserve =

National park in Ghana

- Location within Ghana
- Location: Western Region of Ghana
- Nearest city: Tarkwa
- Coordinates: 5°37′N 2°6′W
- Area: 1.5 km^{2} (0.58 sq mi)
- Established: 1990

Bawdie Arboretum is an ecotourism site located in Bawdie, a town in the Western Region. It is located about 156 km southwest of Kumasi. The reserve has a variety of plant species and game and wildlife living in their natural habitats, including the pangolin and cinnamon.
