= Robert Wisdom Cudjoe =

Ghanaian politician

Hon. Robert Wisdom Cudjoe
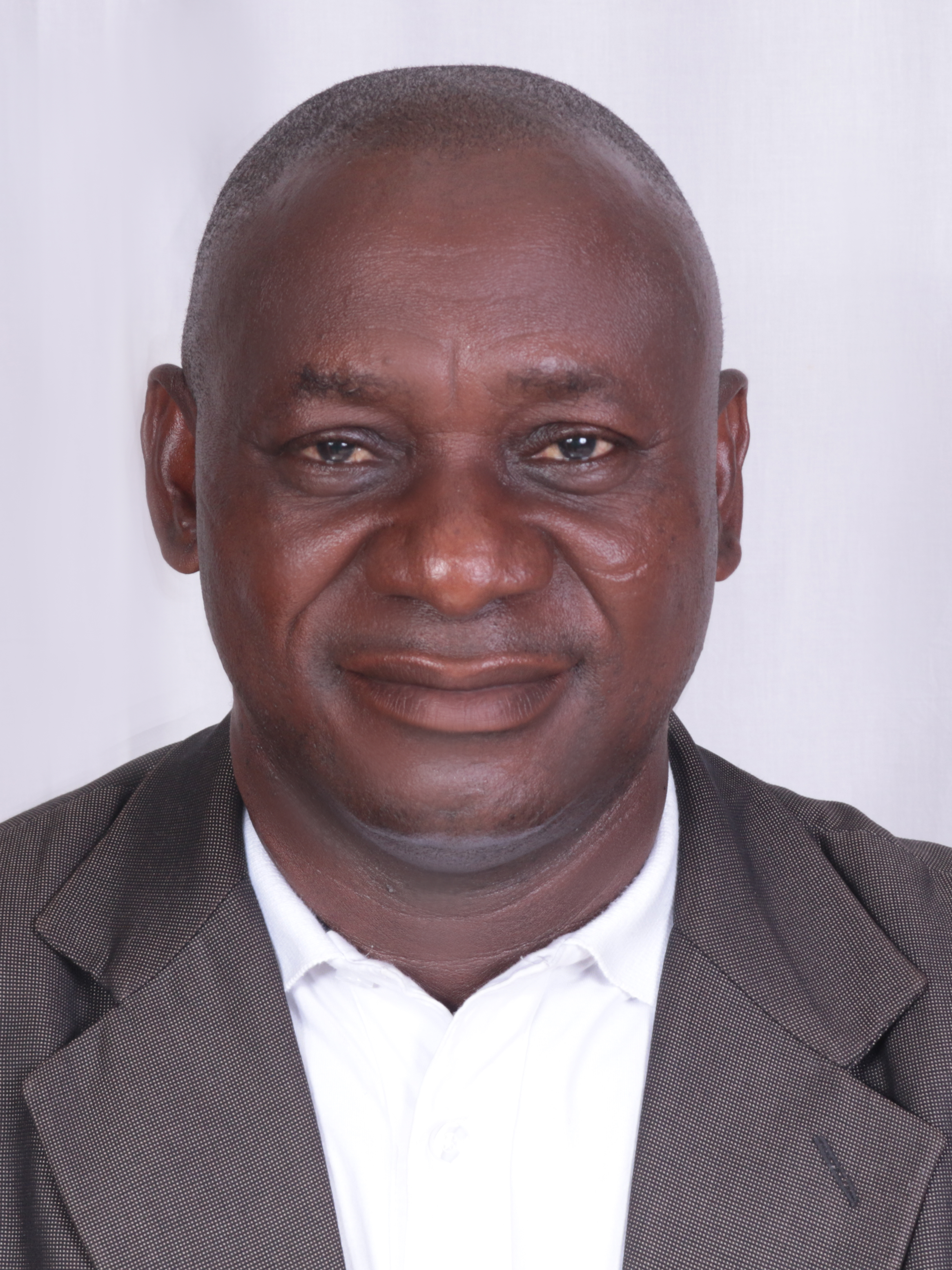

Member of the Ghana Parliament for Prestea-Huni Valley Constituency
- Incumbent
- Assumed office 7 January 2021
- Preceded by: Francis Adu-Blay Koffie
- Succeeded by: Barbara Oteng Gyasi

Personal details
- Born: 6 June 1965 (age 61) Aboso, Nsuaem
- Party: National Democratic Congress
- Education: MA Human Resource Management, B.ED Psyco. (Education), Diploma in Art (Religion), ASSOCIATE MEMBER (HRM), O LEVEL, A LEVEL
- Occupation: Politician
- Profession: Teacher

Robert Wisdom Cudjoe is a Ghanaian politician who serves as a member of parliament for the Prestea-Huni Valley Constituency.

== Early life and education ==
Cudjoe was born on June 6, 1965. He hails from Aboso Nsuaem in the Western Region of Ghana.He also served as district chief executive (DCE) from 2008 to 2016.

He holds an MA Human Resource Management, which was awarded to him in 2005; he also holds a B.ED. in Psychology (Education), which was also awarded to him in 1998.

Cudjoe also holds Diploma in Art (Religion), which he received in 1997, and an Associate Member (HRM) in 2019. He has both A and O levels, which were awarded to him in 1988 and 1986, respectively.

== Donations ==
On November 12, 2023, he donated sewing machines and 1,000 Ghanaian cedis to the Bogoso seamstress center, aiming to support its traninig programs.

== Personal life ==
Robert Wisdom Cudjoe is a Christian.
