= A. B. Crentsil =

Ghanaian musician (1943–2022)

- Born: Alfred Benjamin Crentsil Jr; 1943; Prestea, Gold Coast
- Died: 13 July 2022 (aged 78)
- Genres: Highlife
- Website: ghanabase.com/abcrentsil

Alfred Benjamin Crentsil (1943 – 13 July 2022) was a Ghanaian musician. He was one of the "big three" of contemporary Ghanaian vocalists. Crentsil won the Fontomfrom Evergreen Award, an honor bestowed upon a musician with 15–20 years of continuous music experience. He died on 13 July 2022.

== Family life ==
Crentsil had eight children with his wife Elizabeth.

== Biography ==
Alfred Benjamin Crentsil Jr was born in Prestea, Gold Coast (present-day Ghana), to Alfred Benjamin Crentsil Sr and Esi Yaaba in 1943. He was always known as AB junior until his father died in 1984, when he assumed the A. B. Crentsil name. His primary and middle school education was at the Takoradi Methodist Primary and Rev Cleveland Middle School respectively. After his middle-school examinations, AB worked as an electrical apprentice under his father, who was Works Superintendent of the technical branch of Ghana Railways at Takoradi.

While in middle school, Crentsil was introduced to the guitar and became proficient in playing guitar, singing along when playing it. He was simultaneously working as an electrician and playing with the Strollers Band. Crentsil has played with the El Dorados, the Sweet Talks – which latter group in the 1970s, under the joint leadership of Crentsil and Smart Nkansah, and were the resident band at The Talk Of The Town Hotel in Tema, with Crentsil as a lead singer and then finally the Ahenfo Band.

Crentsil opened a 16-track recording studio in 1990. "Devil" is among his best-known songs.
