= Emmanuel Appiah (entrepreneur) =

Ghanaian entrepreneur and CEO

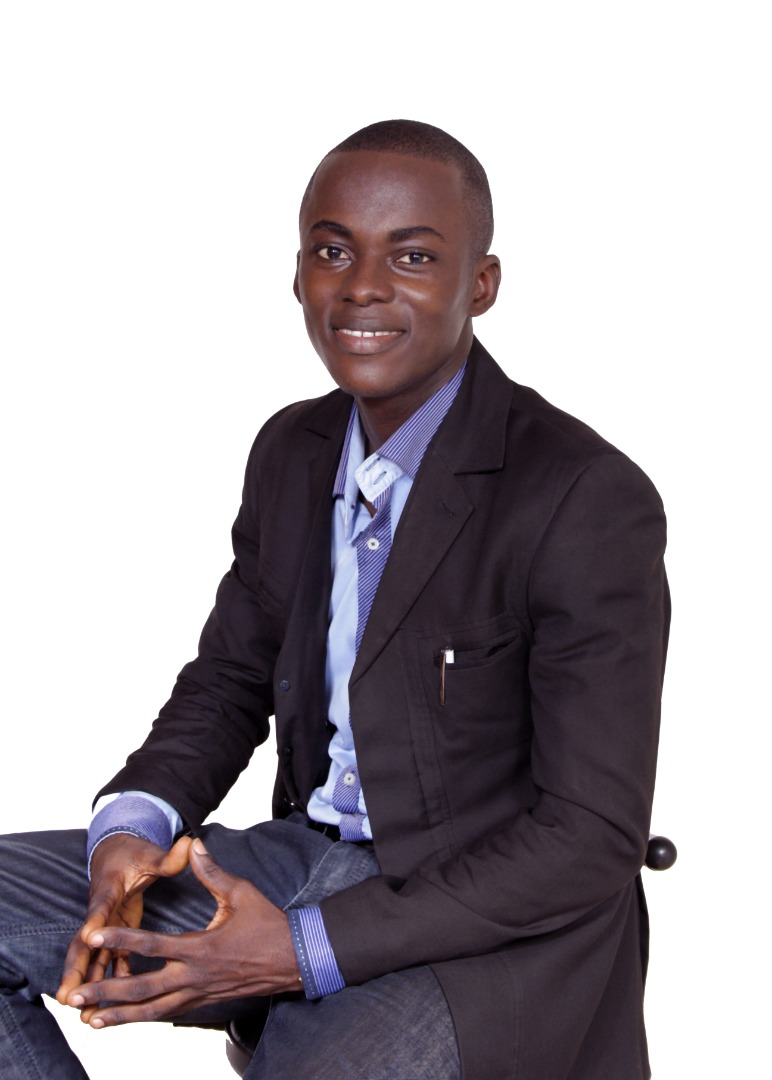
A picture of Emmanuel Appiah

Emmanuel Appiah is a Ghanaian technology entrepreneur and 'acting' Chief Executive Officer of Aireceive LLC, a technology company in Ghana. He is known to have developed an app to improve sanitation in Ghana and communicate without the use of internet.

== Education ==
He is a graduate of University of Mines and Technology where he studied Mechanical Engineering and Majored in selected and specific Computer Science Courses.

== Career and life ==
He has developed an app "Wonelcycler" (read backwards as 'recycle now' ) which aids persons with used empty bottles scan without the use of the internet and get paid. He has provided employment opportunities to vendors that meet at designated locations

== Achievements ==
- On August 8, 2019, he received Government funding of GH 20,000.00 out of the requested GH 97,800.00 in the National Entrepreneurship and Innovation Programme (N.E.I.P) towards the development of Aireceive at 10% pay back to the government, with the rest of the funding to be given within the first two years of paying back the first GH 20,000.00 puts the company valuation between GH 200,000.00 and GH 970,000.00.
- His application Wonelcycer came forth as the winners of Winners of Creatives in Augmented Reality Enterprises (CARE) hackathon in September 2018 at Kumasi Hive, Kentinkrono. Wonecyccer emerged as winners because it an Augmented reality app picking teach giving information of its worth in the market. The hackathon saw ten groups pitching their ideas with the first three groups receiving 250 Euros each. The program was organized by Kumasi Hive together with British Council and Department of Communication at Kwame Nkrumah University of Science and Technology with the focus of training participants in Augmented reality.
