= Barbara Oteng Gyasi =

Ghanaian politician (born 1964)

The Honourable Barbara Oteng Gyasi MP

Minister of Tourism, Culture and Creative Arts
- Incumbent
- Assumed office February 2019
- President: Nana Akuffo-Addo
- Preceded by: Catherine Afeku

Member of Ghana Parliament for Prestea-Huni Valley constituency
- In office 7 January 2017 – 6 January 2021
- Preceded by: Francis Adu-Blay Koffie
- Succeeded by: Robert Wisdom Cudjoe

Personal details
- Born: 5 October 1964 (age 61) Ghana
- Party: New Patriotic Party
- Spouse: Tony Oteng Gyasi
- Children: 5
- Education: University of Ghana; Ghana School of Law
- Profession: Lawyer

Barbara Oteng Gyasi (born 5 October 1964) is a Ghanaian politician and a former Member of Parliament for Prestea-Huni Valley constituency of the Western Region of Ghana. She is a member of the New Patriotic Party (NPP), and was a Deputy Minister for Lands and Natural Resources in Ghana and also the former Minister of Tourism, Culture and Creative Arts.

== Early life and education ==
Gyasi was born on 5 October 1964. She has a degree in law from the University of Ghana. and also holds a Bachelor of Law degree from the Ghana School of Law.

== Career ==
Gyasi worked as the head of legal department in Vivo Energy Ghana Limited from 2012 to 2016.

== Politics ==
As the NPP candidate, Gyasi was elected to represent the Prestea-Huni Valley Constituency in 2016, but failed to retain the seat in the 2020 Ghanaian elections, as she lost to Robert Wisdom Cudjoe of the National Democratic Congress (NDC).

=== 2016 election ===
Gyasi contested the Prestea-Huni Valley constituency parliamentary seat on the ticket of the New Patriotic Party during the 2016 Ghanaian general election and won with 36,444 votes, representing 51.86% of the total votes. He won the parliamentary seat over Robert Wisdom Cudjoe of the National Democratic Congress, Duku Edmund of the Progressive People's Party, Theophiles Badu Samora Barimah of the IND and Francis Owusu Eduku of the Convention People's Party. They obtained 32,073 votes, 848 votes, 755 votes and 152 votes respectively. These represent 45.64%, 1.21%, 1.06% and 0.23% of the total votes respectively.

==== 2020 election ====
Gyasi again contested the Prestea-Huni Valley (Ghana parliament constituency) on the ticket of the New Patriotic Party during the 2020 Ghanaian general election but lost the election to Robert Wisdom Cudjoe of the National Democratic Congress.

== Personal life ==
Oteng Gyasi is a Christian. She has five children:

- Nana Kwame Oteng-Gyasi (investment banker; entrepreneur; director family business)
- Francis Oteng-Gyasi (social worker)
- Anthony Oteng-Gyasi JNR (manager in family business)
- Barbara Oteng-Gyasi (college law student)
- Cheryl Oteng-Gyasi (college law student)
