= Tarkwa-Nsuaem (Ghana parliament constituency) =

Constituency in Ghana

Tarkwa-Nsuaem Municipal District
- constituency for the Parliament of Ghana
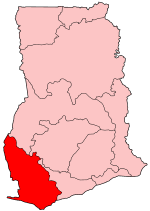
- District: Tarkwa-Nsuaem Municipal District
- Region: Western Region of Ghana

Current constituency
- Party: New Patriotic Party
- MP: George Mireku Duker

Tarkwa-Nsuaem is one of the constituencies represented in the Parliament of Ghana. It elects one Member of Parliament (MP) by the first past the post system of election. It is located in the Western Region of Ghana.

== LIST OF PAST MPs ==
George Mireku Duker 2016-2020

Gifty Eugenia Kwofie 2012-2016

Gifty Eugenia Kwofie 2008-2012

Gifty Eugenia Kwofie 2004-2008

Gifty Eugenia Kwofie 2000-2004

Joseph Ghansah 1996-2000

== See also ==
- List of Ghana Parliament constituencies
