= Pemeso =

- Country: Ghana
- Region: Western Region
- District: Prestea-Huni Valley District

Pemeso is a farming community in the Prestea-Huni Valley district, a district in the Western Region of Ghana. The community has a river known as the Peme river which flows from Pemeso into Mansi.
