= John Kobina Abbam Aboah Sanie =

Ghanaian politician

Hon John Kobina Abbam Aboah Sanie
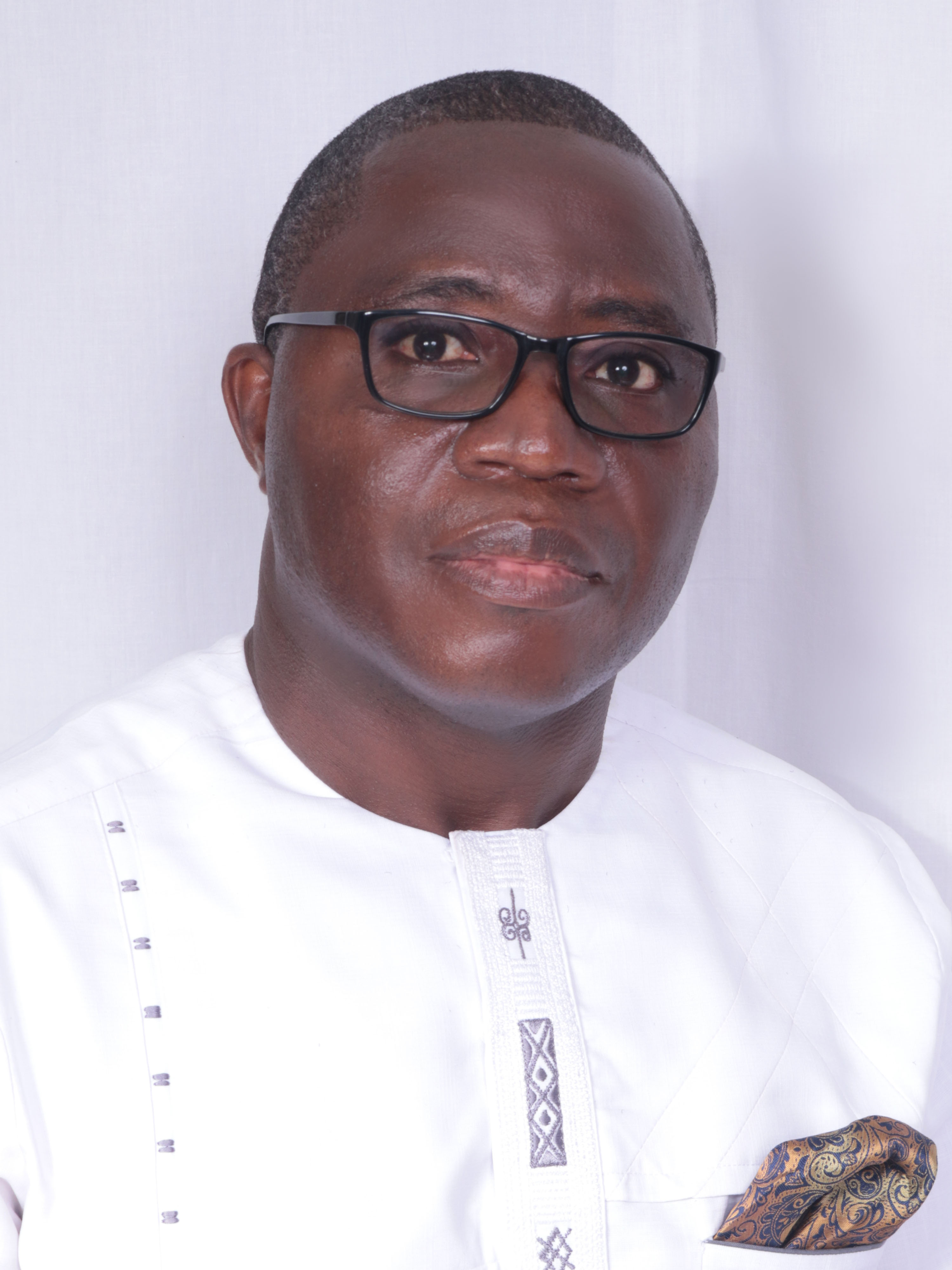

Member of the Ghana Parliament for Mpohor
- Incumbent
- Assumed office 7 January 2021

Personal details
- Born: John Kobina Abbam Aboah Sanie; 10 August 1971 (age 54) Mpohor
- Party: New Patriotic Party
- Occupation: Politician
- Committees: Privileges Committee, Trade, Industry and Tourism Committee

John Kobina Abbam Aboah Sanie (born 10 August 1971) is a Ghanaian politician and member of the New Patriotic Party. He is the member of parliament for the Mpohor Constituency, in the Western Region of Ghana

== Early life and education ==
Aboah Sanie hails from Mpohor. He holds a Bsc In Entrepreneurship

== Personal life ==
Sanie is a Christian.
