= Aboso =

- Town & District
- Location of Aboso in Western Region
- Coordinates: 5°21′48″N 1°56′52″W
- Country: Ghana
- Region: Western Region
- District: Prestea Huni-Valley District

Population (2013)
  - Total: 9,945
- Time zone: GMT
  - Summer (DST): GMT

Aboso is a town near Tarkwa, and is the capital of Wassa West district, a district in the Western Region of Ghana. Aboso is the 78th most populous settlement in Ghana, with a population of 9,945 people. At the Ghana census of 18 March 1984, there were 4,700 inhabitants living in the town.

The town has been in an important center in the goldfields in the Tarkwa hills since the late 19th century. The town is the namesake for Aboso Goldfield Ltd, a subsidiary of Gold Fields which operates the nearby Damang mine.

The town used to be the location for the Aboso Glass Factory, a major manufacturer and supplier of bottles for the beverage industry.

== See also ==
- Railway stations in Ghana
