= Francis Adu-Blay Koffie =

Ghanaian politician

Hon. Francis Adu-Blay Koffie

Member of the Ghana Parliament for Prestea-Huni Valley Constituency
- In office 7 January 2009 – 6 January 2017
- Preceded by: Albert Kwaku Obbin
- Succeeded by: Barbara Oten-Gyasi

Personal details
- Born: 25 October 1962 (age 63) Ghana
- Party: National Democratic Congress
- Education: Ghana Institute of Management and Public Administration
- Profession: Miner

Francis Adu-Blay Koffie is a Ghanaian politician who served as a member of parliament for the Prestea-Huni Valley Constituency from 2009 to 2017.

== Early life and education ==
Koffie was born on 25 October 1962. He hails from Heman in the Western Region of Ghana. He had his early education at the Prestea LA Middle School graduating with his Middle School Leaving Certificate in 1979. He obtained his diploma in accounting from the Ghana Institute of Management and Public Administration.

== Career ==
Koffie is a miner by profession. Prior to entering politics, he was the assistant storekeeper of the Prestea Sankofa Goldfields Company Limited.

== Politics ==
Koffie entered parliament on 7 January 2009 representing the Prestea-Huni Valley Constituency on the ticket of the National Democratic Congress (NDC). He remained in parliament for a second consecutive term but lost to Barbara Oten-Gyasi of the New Patriotic Party in his third bid to occupy the seat.

While in parliament, Koffie served on various parliamentary committees, some of which include; the Special Budget Committee, and the Works and Housing Committee.

== Personal life ==
Koffie is married with four children. He identifies as a Christian.
