= Minerals Income Investment Fund =

Ghanaian investment fund

The Minerals Income Investment Fund is a fund that seeks to manage the equity interests and receive mineral royalties and income for Ghana.These incomes are generated from mining and its operationalization.

== History ==
The fund was established by an ACT of Parliament of the Republic of Ghana, ACT 218, (Act 978), to manage and invest the mining royalties of the Republic. The Act was passed by Parliament of Ghana and President of the Republic of Ghana, Nana Akuffo Addo, assented the ACT on December, 3rd 2018, after Parliament passed it into law which according to him, there are no local companies mining in Ghana over a century.

In 2019, a board was inaugurated to enable the activities of the company to provide support for local sector players to compete with international cooperations.

=== Objectives ===
- To maximize the value of income that is due the republic.
- Raise Local Players in Mining Sector.

=== Members of the Governing Board ===
A nine member board was inaugurated to steer the activities of Minerals Investment Income Fund; George Mireku Duker serves as the Chairman Yaw Baah as the Executive Officer of the MIIF. Felicia Ashley, Maxwell Opoku Afari, Amiishadai Owusu Amoah, Naana Dufie Addo, Kow Essuman, Antoinette Kwofie serve in the capacity as members. The ninth member is yet to be appointed from the Ministry of Lands and Natural Resources.

== Activities ==
1. Raise indigenous players in the mining sector.
2. Manage the equity interests of the Republic in mining companies.
3. Receive mineral royalties
4. Provide for the management and investment of the assets of the Fund
