= Kumasi Hive =

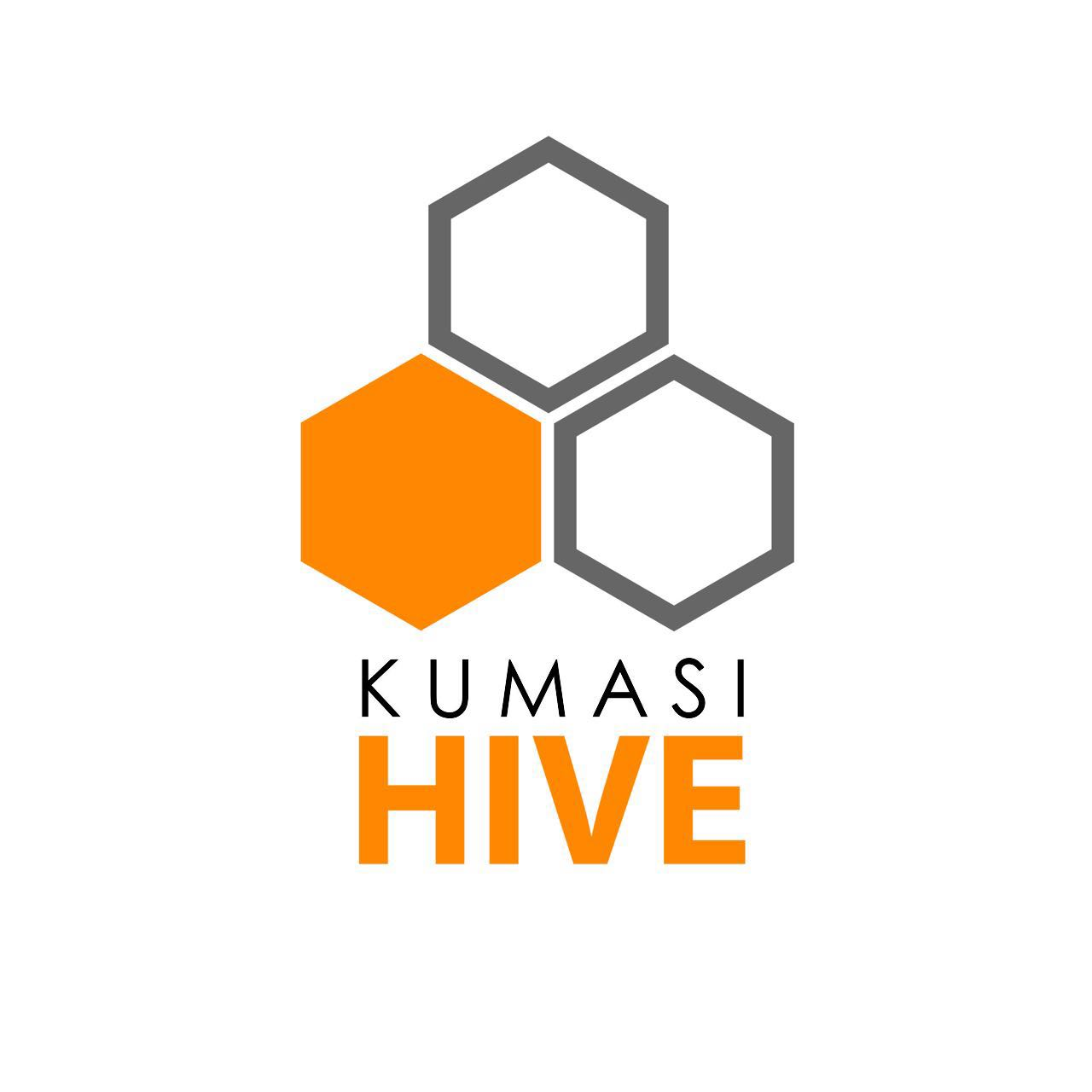
Logo of Kumasi Hive

Kumasi Hive is an innovation hub located in Kumasi, Ghana. The hub is a collaborative makerspace for entrepreneurs to prototype ideas and develop products that have market value. It seeks to develop a sustainable business in Ghana and has produced some brands in Ghana and beyond.

The hub provides innovative support to projects with business models, provides space for hardware and products for youth entrepreneurs. The Hub has two incubation or accelerator activities; hardware incubator and business accelerator.

== Achievements ==
- Kumasi Hive Wins 2018 Miss Africa Digital Prize Worth $5,000
- Solar Taxi, a renewable energy project sponsored by MasterCard Foundation
