= Prestea-Huni Valley (Ghana parliament constituency) =

Ghanaian constituency

- constituency for the Parliament of Ghana
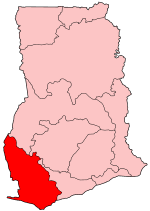
- District: Prestea-Huni Valley District
- Region: Western Region of Ghana

Current constituency
- Party: National Democratic Congress
- MP: Hon. Robert Wisdom Cudjoe

Prestea-Huni Valley is one of the constituencies represented in the Parliament of Ghana. It elects one Member of Parliament (MP) by the first past the post system of election. Robert Wisdom Cudjoe is the member of parliament for the constituency. He was elected on the ticket of the National Democratic Congress (NDC) won a majority of 56,464 votes to become the MP. He took over from Barbara Oteng Gyasi who had represented the constituency on the ticket of the New Patriotic Party (NPP).

== See also ==
- List of Ghana Parliament constituencies
