= Tarkwa-Nsuaem Municipal District =

Municipal district in Western Region, Ghana

- Municipal District
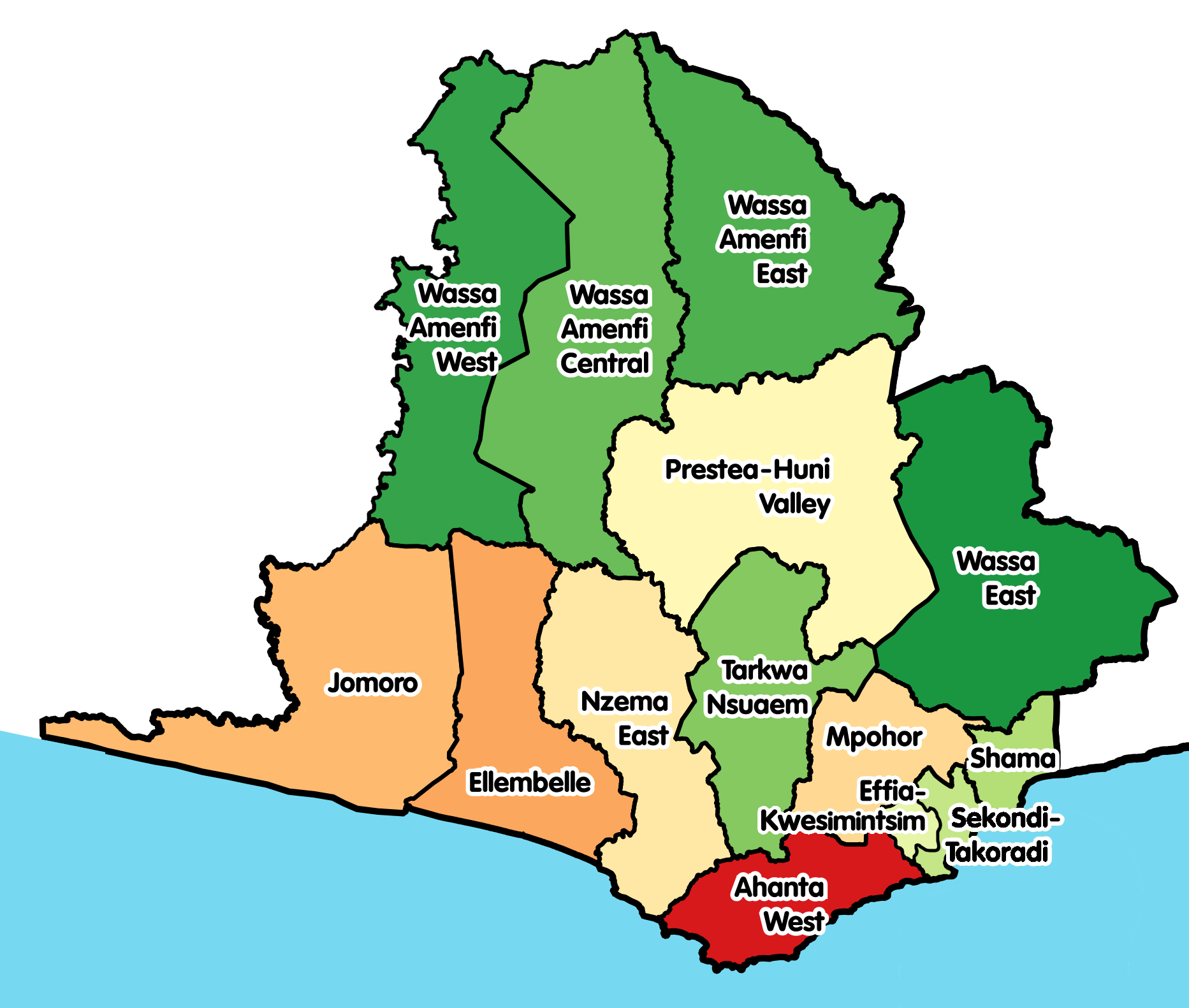
- Districts of Western Region

- Location of Tarkwa-Nsuaem Municipal District within Western
- Coordinates: 5°18′9″N 1°59′14.64″W
- Country: Ghana
- Region: Western
- Capital: Tarkwa

Government
  - Municipal Chief Executive: George Mireku Duker

Area
  - Total: 954.8 km^{2} (368.7 sq mi)

Population (2021)
  - Total: 218,664
  - Density: 229.0/km^{2} (593.1/sq mi)
- Time zone: UTC+0 (GMT)
- ISO 3166 code: GH-WP-TN

Tarkwa-Nsuaem Municipal District (French: District Municipal de Tarkwa-Nsuaem), as at 2024, is one of the fourteen districts in Western Region, Ghana. Originally, it was formerly part of the then-larger Wassa West District in 1988, which was created from the former Wassa-Fiase-Mpohor District Council, until the northern part of the district was split off to create Prestea-Huni Valley District on 29 February 2008; thus the remaining part has been renamed as Tarkwa-Nsuaem District, which was later elevated to municipal district assembly status on that same year to become Tarkwa-Nsuaem Municipal District. It has a population of about 218,664 people. The municipality is located in the eastern part of Western Region and has Tarkwa as its capital town.

== Geography ==
Tarkwa-Nsuaem Municipal District is located between Latitude 400’N and 500 40’N and Longitudes 10 45’ W and 20 10’W. It is bounded to the north by the Wassa Amenfi East District, to the south by the Ahanta West District, to the West by the Nzema East Municipal and to the East by Mpohor Wassa East. The municipality has a total land area of 2354 km^{2}.

== Resource ==
The district is one of the richest in Ghana in terms of natural resources. Like, Obuasi in the Ashanti Region of Ghana, gold is its major natural resource. There is also a manganese mine at Nsuta a suburb of Tarkwa. The Tarkwa glass factory, which was set up by Ghana's first president, Kwame Nkrumah though no defunct is also in the district. The Tarkwa Gold Mine is situated some four kilometers west of the town of Tarkwa. The district also has the region's only public university - the George Grant University of Mines and Technology.

== Sources ==
- "Districts of Ghana". Statoids.
- GhanaDistricts.com
