= Isaac Adjei Mensah =

Ghanaian politician

Hon. Isaac Adjei Mensah MP
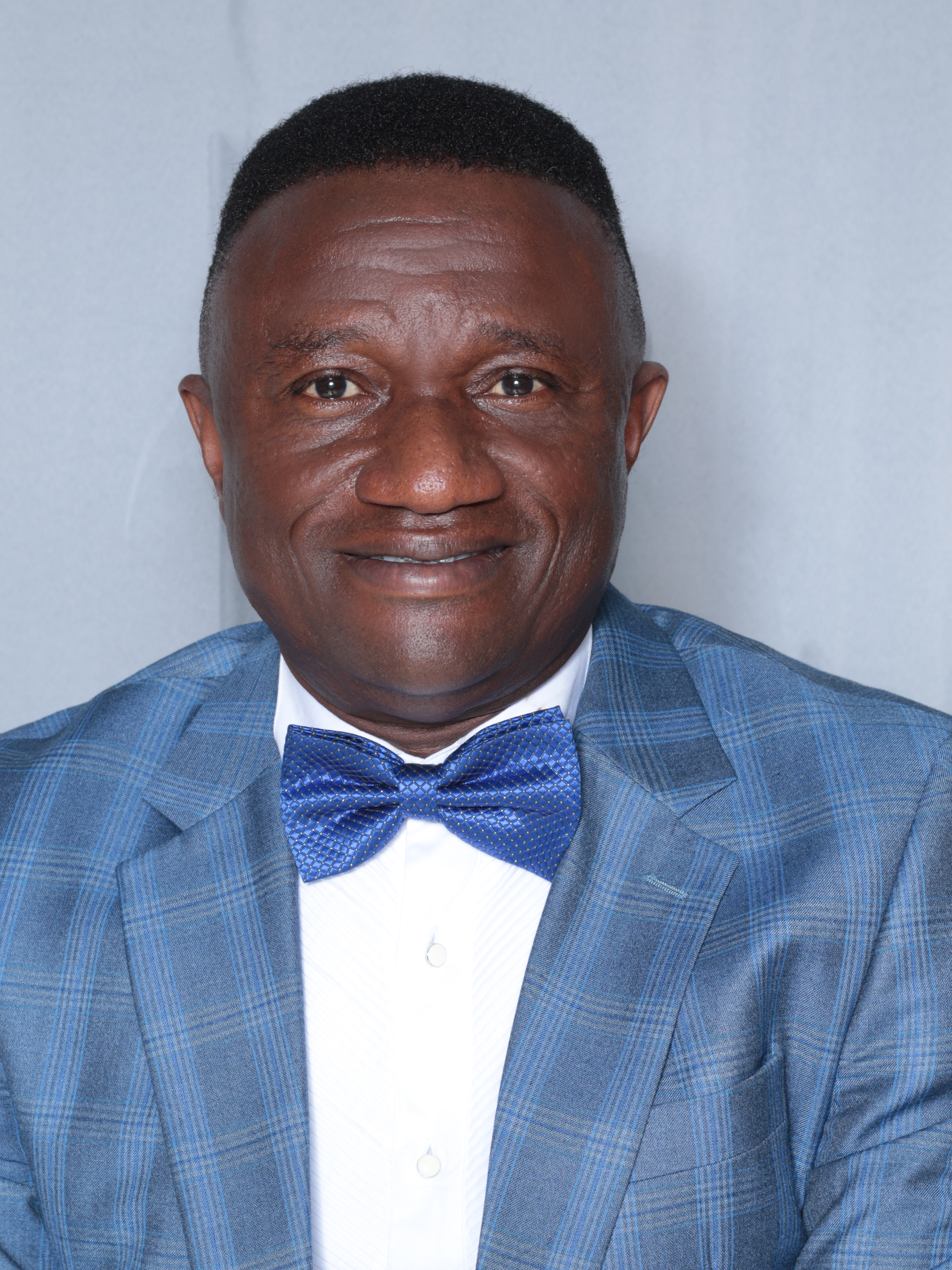

Member of the Ghana Parliament for Wassa East Constituency
- Incumbent
- Assumed office 7 January 2013
- Preceded by: Constituency split

Personal details
- Born: 26 March 1963 (age 63)
- Party: National Democratic Congress

Isaac Adjei Mensah is a Ghanaian politician and member of the Seventh Parliament of the Fourth Republic of Ghana representing the Wassa East Constituency in the Western Region on the ticket of the National Democratic Congress.

== Early life and education ==
Isaac Adjei Mensah was born on Tuesday 26 March 1963. He hails from Dompim Number 1, a town in the Western Region of Ghana. He entered the University of Ghana in 1988 and obtained his bachelor's degree in Sociology in 1991. He later proceeded to the University of Tromsø, Norway in 1992 for his post graduate studies. He graduated in 1997 with his MBA in Public Policy.

== Career ==
Prior to entering politics, Isaac was the Regional Human Resource Manager for Newmont Ghana Limited from 2006 to 2012.

== Politics ==
Isaac Adjei Mensah is a member of the National Democratic Congress (NDC). In 2012, he contested for the Wassa East seat on the ticket of the NDC and won. He was elected once again in 2016 to represent the constituency in the seventh parliament of the fourth republic. In parliament he has served on various committees, some of which include; the Education Committee, the House Committee and the Special Budget Committee.

== Personal life ==
He is married with five children and identifies as a Christian and a member of the Church of Pentecost.
