= Wassa West District =

Former District in Western region, Ghana

- Former District
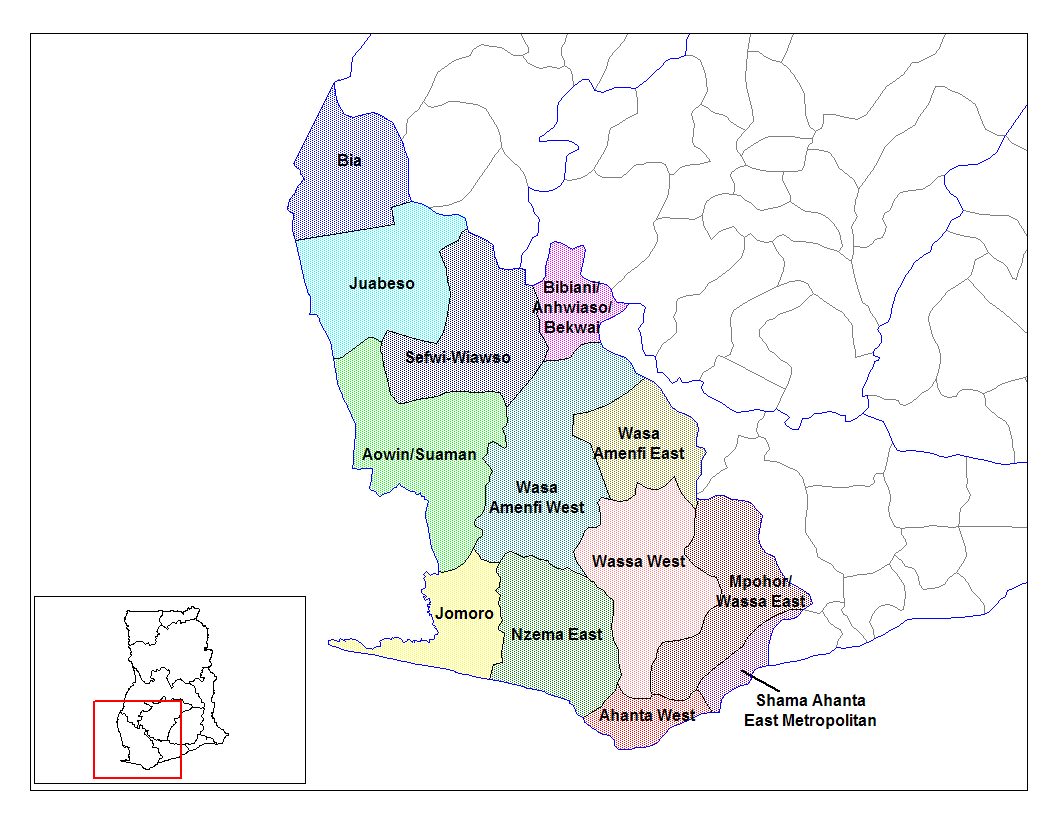
- Districts of Western Region

- Location of Wassa West District within Western
- Coordinates: 5°18′9″N 1°59′14.64″W
- Country: Ghana
- Region: Western
- Capital: Tarkwa

Government
  - District Executive: Emmanuel K. Ayensu

Area
  - Total: 2,578 km^{2} (995 sq mi)
- Time zone: UTC+0 (GMT)
- ISO 3166 code: GH-WP-WW

Wassa West District is a former district that was located in Western Region, Ghana. Originally, it was created as an ordinary district assembly in 1988, which was created from the former Wassa-Fiase-Mpohor District Council. However, on 29 February 2008, it was split off into two new districts: Tarkwa-Nsuaem Municipal District (which was elevated to municipal district assembly status on that same year; capital: Tarkwa) and Prestea-Huni Valley District (which was elevated to municipal district assembly status on 15 March 2018; capital: Bogoso). The district assembly was located in the eastern part of Western Region and had Tarkwa as its capital town.

== Sources ==
- "Districts of Ghana". Statoids.
- GhanaDistricts.com
