= Mpohor (district) =

District in Western region, Ghana

Mpohor District
- District
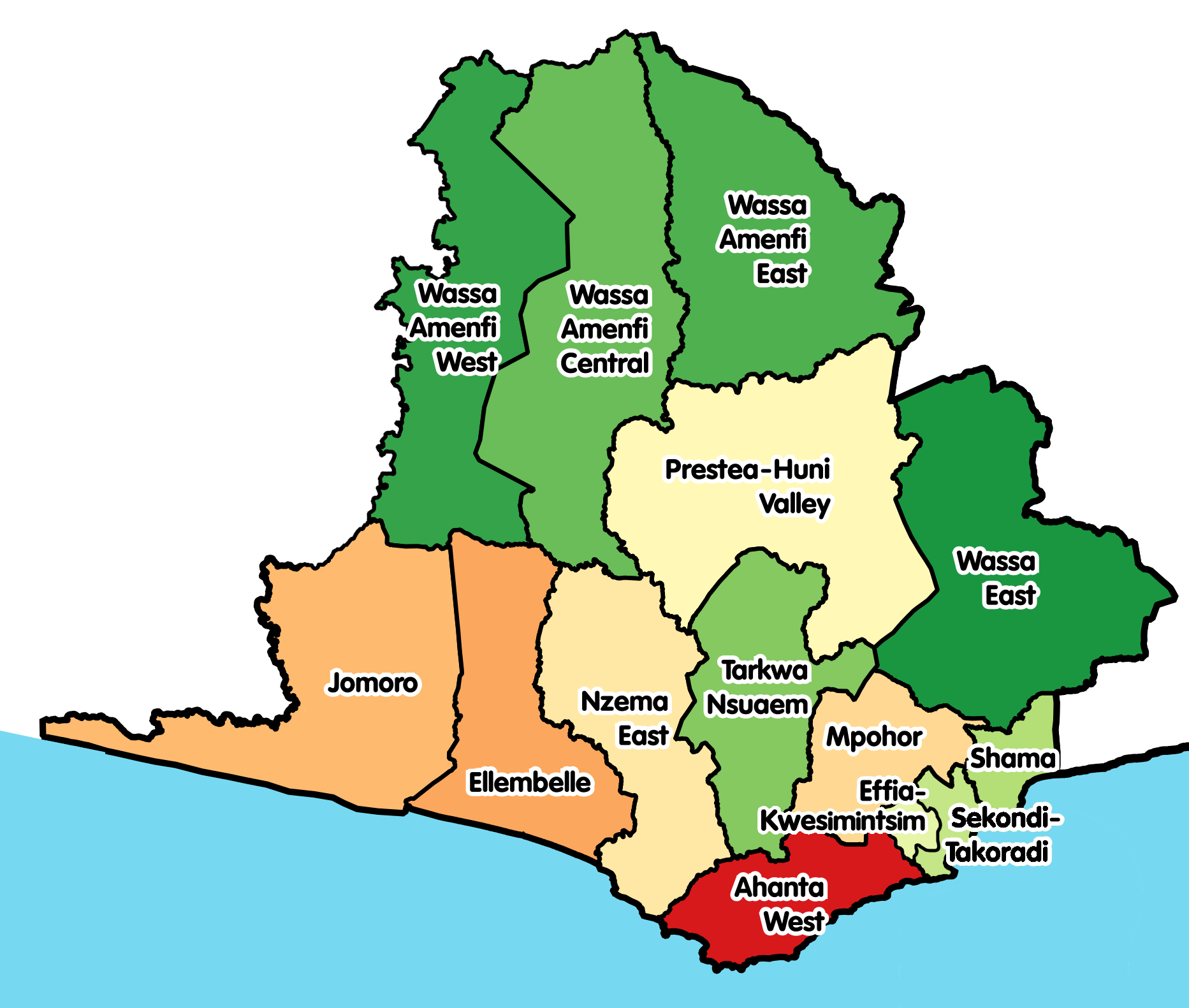
- Districts of Western Region

- Location of Mpohor District within Western
- Coordinates: 4°58′14″N 1°53′34″W
- Country: Ghana
- Region: Western
- Capital: Mpohor

Area
  - Total: 718.5 km^{2} (277.4 sq mi)

Population (2021)
  - Total: 52,473
  - Density: 73.03/km^{2} (189.2/sq mi)
- Time zone: UTC+0 (GMT)
- ISO 3166 code: GH-WP-MP

Mpohor District is one of the fourteen districts in Western Region, Ghana. Originally it was formerly part of the then-larger Mpohor/Wassa East District in 1988, which was created from the former Wassa-Fiase-Mpohor District Council, until the southwest part of the district was split off to create Mpohor District on 28 June 2012; thus the remaining part has been renamed as Wassa East District. The district assembly is located in the eastern part of Western Region and has Mpohor as its capital town.
