= Yam Festival (Aburi) =

Festival in Ghana by the people of Aburi

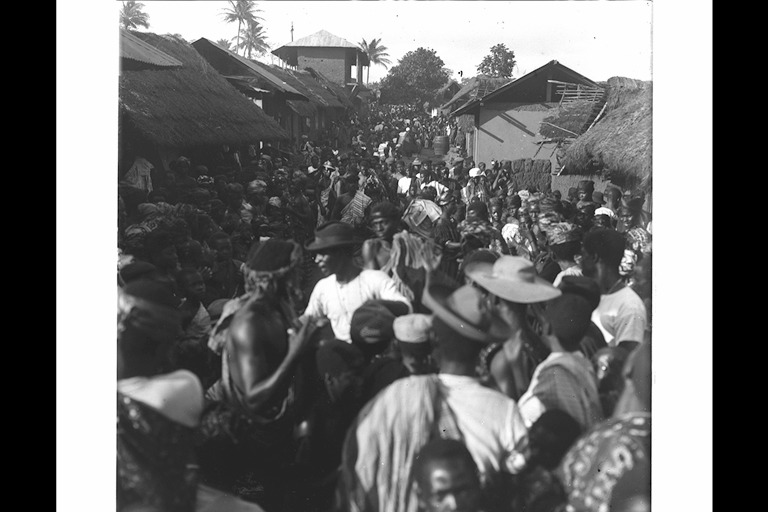
Yam Festival in Aburi

Yam Festival is an annual harvest festival celebrated by the chiefs and peoples of Aburi Traditional Area in the Eastern Region of Ghana. It is usually celebrated in the month of September.

== Celebrations ==
During the festival, visitors are welcomed to share food and drinks. The people put on traditional clothes and there is durbar of chiefs. There is also dancing and drumming.

== Significance ==
This festival is celebrated to mark the harvest of the new yam tuber and Ntoa, their god of harvest.
