= George Mireku Duker =

Ghanaian politician

Hon George Mireku Duker
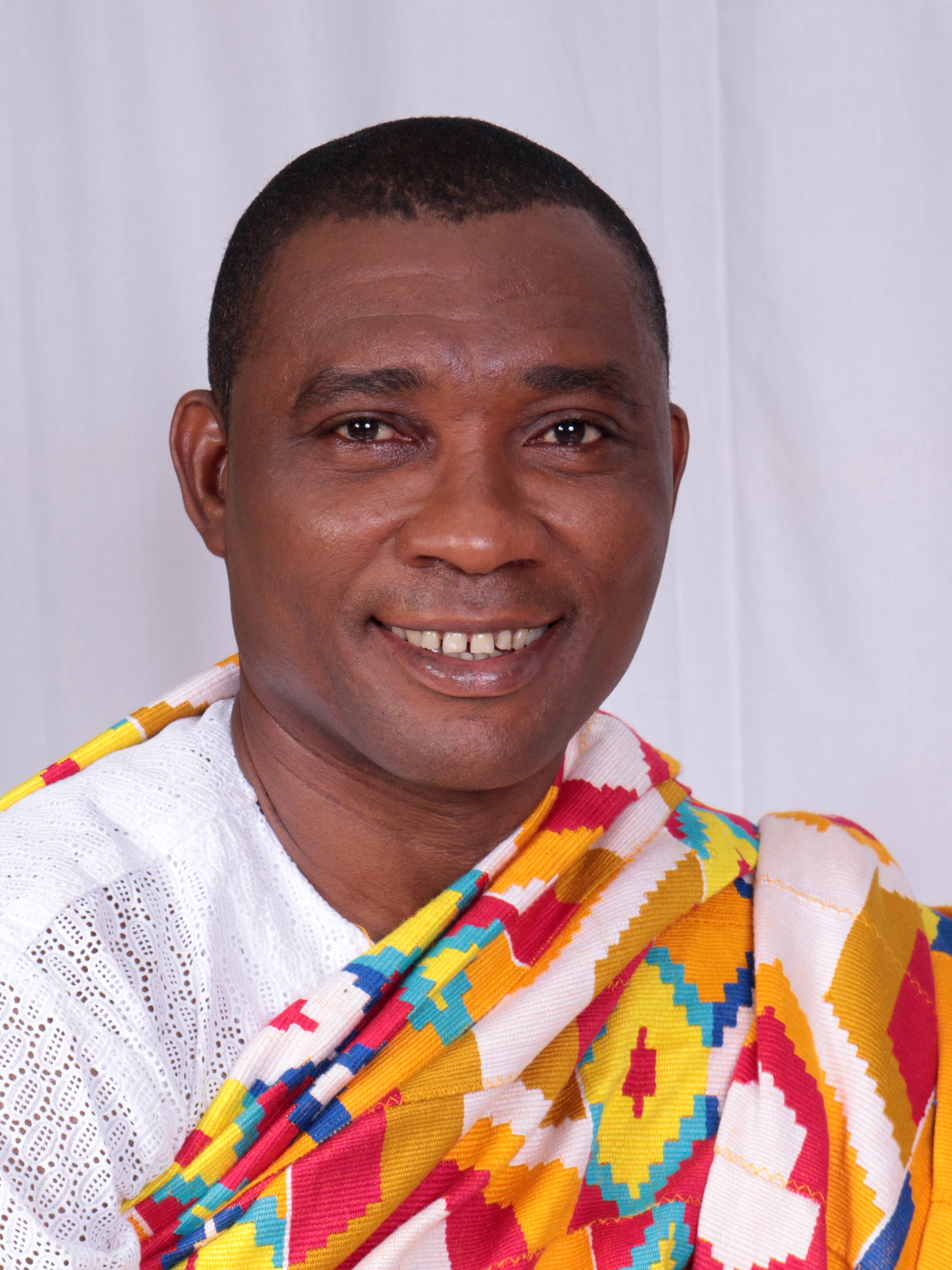

Member of the Ghana Parliament for Tarkwa-Nsuaem
- In office 7 January 2017 – 7 January 2025
- Preceded by: Gifty Eugenia Kwofie
- Succeeded by: Issah Salifu Taylor

Deputy Minister at Ministry of Lands and Natural Resources
- In office June 2021 – January 2025
- President: Nana Akufo-Addo
- Succeeded by: Yusif Sulemana

Municipal Chief Executive for Tarkwa-Nsuaem
- In office March 2008 – February 2009
- President: John Kufuor
- Preceded by: Emmanuel Kwesi Ayensu
- Succeeded by: Christiana Kobina

Personal details
- Born: 9 May 1975 (age 51) Dompim-Pepesa
- Party: New Patriotic Party
- Occupation: Politician

George Mireku Duker (born 9 May 1975) is a Ghanaian politician. He servied as a Deputy Minister at Ghana's Ministry of Lands and Natural Resources from 2021 to 2025 and was the former Member of Parliament for Tarkwa-Nsuaem between 2017 and 2025. He was elected into parliament on the ticket of the New Patriotic Party.

== Early life ==
George Mireku Duker was born on May 9, 1975 in Dompim-Pepesa in the Tarkwa municipality.

Duker graduated with a B.Ed in Accounting from the University of Education-Kumasi Campus (now A.A.M U.S.T.E.D.) in 2006. Duker hold a B. A. in Law from the University of London. Duker obtained a master's degree in Business Management from the University of Plymouth in 2010.

In May 2024, George Mireku Duker celebrated his birthday by donating 10 wheelchairs, 11 crutches, and funds to Persons with Disabilities (PWDs). Attendees included PWDs, MPs, NPP members, and religious leaders.

Duker encouraged PWDs to stay positive and emphasized the need for accessibility in building design. He also urged timely allocation of funds from local authorities to support PWDs.

== Personal life ==
George Mireku Duker is a christian.

== Early career ==
Duker was a teacher from 1998 to 2006 at Marysons College. In 2007, he became a Special Aide at Ghana's Ministry of Local Government before being appointed in 2008 as Municipal Chief Executive for Tarkwa-Nsuaem by President John Kufuor.

Duker was also the Programs Manager of Integrated Social Development Centre (ISODEC) from 2011 to 2012.

== MP in 7th Parliament (2017 - 2021) ==
In December 2016, Duker stood in the parliamentary elections as a parliamentary candidate of the New Patriotic Party in the Tarkwa-Nsuaem Constituency. He polled 42,594 votes representing 62.21% of the total votes cast. His contenders; Seth Kwame Dzokoto of the NDC polled 24,044 representing 35.12%, Eric Asiedu Simpey of the PPP polled 1624 representing 2.37% and Kwakye John Justice of the CPP polled 206 representing 0.30%.

Duker was sworn into the 7th parliament of the Fourth Republic on 7 January 2017. In the 7th parliament, he went on to serve as the Vice Chair on the Select Committee on Mines and Energy during the 7th parliament. In 2018, as Vice Chair of the Select Committee on Mines and Energy, he gave a briefing in the plenary session of parliament on the 2019 budgetary plan to capture the distribution of 60,000 gas stoves in Ghana to ensure implementation of the gas cylinder re-circulation model.

== Chair of Mineral Income Investment Fund (2019 - 2021) ==
In 2019, President Nana Akufo-Addo appointed Duker as first chairperson of the Minerals Income Investment Fund (MIIF). The fund manages the equity interest of the Republic of Ghana mining companies to receive minerals royalties and other related income due Ghana from mining operations. As chairperson of the fund, he defended the use of MIIF in creation of Agyapa Royalties, advocating on the potential of the Agyapa agreement to lead to job creation and infrastructure development.

== Re-elected as MP in 8th Parliament (2021 - ) ==
In December 2020, Duker defeated Justice Abbam of the NDC to retain his seat in parliament as MP for Tarkwa-Nsuaem in a close election. Duker polled 31,946 votes with Abbam polling 31,845 votes. The total valid votes cast was 93,938.

In the 8th Parliament, Duker serves on two committees which includes the Public Accounts Standing Committee where he is Deputy Ranking member on the committee.

In 2023, Duker was announced to chair Tarkwa-based Medeama Soccer Club's finance and sponsorship committee as they headed for the 2023 CAF Champions League.

== Deputy Minister in charge of Mines (2021-) ==
In April 2021, President Nana Akufo Addo nominated Duker for the post of Deputy Minister at the Ministry of Land and Natural Resources. Duker appeared before the Appointments Committee of Parliament in June 2021. That same month, Duker was sworn in as one of 39 deputy ministers for the second term of President Nana Akufo-Addo.
