= Prestea =

Prestea Wassa
- Town
- Location of Prestea in Western Region
- Coordinates: 05°26′00″N 02°09′00″W
- Country: Ghana
- Region: Western Region
- District: Prestea-Huni Valley District

Population (2013)
  - Total: 35,760
- Ranked 46th in Ghana
- Time zone: GMT
  - Summer (DST): GMT

Prestea is a town in the Western Region, in southwest Ghana and about 50 km north of the coast of the Atlantic Ocean. It lies on the west bank of the Ankobra River, about 60 mi (100 km) northwest of Cape coast. The town is part of the Prestea-Huni Valley District. Prestea is the forty-sixth most populous in Ghana, in terms of population, with a population of 35,760 people. A railway line connects Prestea to Tarkwa and beyond to the coastal city of Sekondi-Takoradi.

== History of Prestea ==
Since 1873 there has been mining of gold deposits in Prestea, and in 1965, independent gold mining companies based in Prestea were merged at the time by the government. The World Bank granted a loan in 1985 to finance the gold mining in Prestea, but after three years of continuous losses by the merged gold company, the mines that were privatized from 1994 to 1999 had their mineral rights sold to the Canadian company of Golden Star Resources. The mining of gold caused environmental problems, such as the storage of overburden in the vicinity of the hospital, and contamination of the river with toxic waste, as happened in October 2004. Due to the vibrations caused by the explosions, damage was caused to the buildings of the town. The gold mines are a tourist attraction, partly due to the smelter where the gold is melted down into ingots and two tennis courts and an 18-hole golf course.

== Economy ==
The Prestea community has suffered from the detrimental effects of over a century of mining activities, as of 2011 this town still boast of only one senior high school in the area although overwhelming amount of riches is being gained from their soils.

== Education ==
The higher education institution is the Prestea Senior High Technical School. There is also the Prestea Goldfields International School. Due to the presence of gold in abundance in Prestea, the kids don't like pursuing education but rather they like to chase money by indulging in small scale mining practices.

== Sports ==
In the years 2002 and 2003, the town's local football club Prestea Mines Stars played in the highest Ghanaian football league, the Ghana Premier League. The renovated Prestea stadium was financially supported by the company Bogoso Gold Limited. In 2019, a modern recreational park was established by Golden Star Bogoso/Prestea Limited. The recreational park has facilities like locker rooms, a lecture hall, two basketball courts and a car park as well as a vast utility area. Since its commissioning, the facility has become a center for social gatherings. Political parties host their Presidential Aspirants, Annual NBA Nights, Wedding Reception and Musical Festivals.

== Transport ==
Prestea is the terminus of a railway branchline linked with Tarkwa and Sekondi-Takoradi. It is located in the Western region of Ghana.

== See also ==
- Geology of Ghana
- Birimian
- Railway stations in Ghana
