= Wassa East District =

District in Western region, Ghana

- District
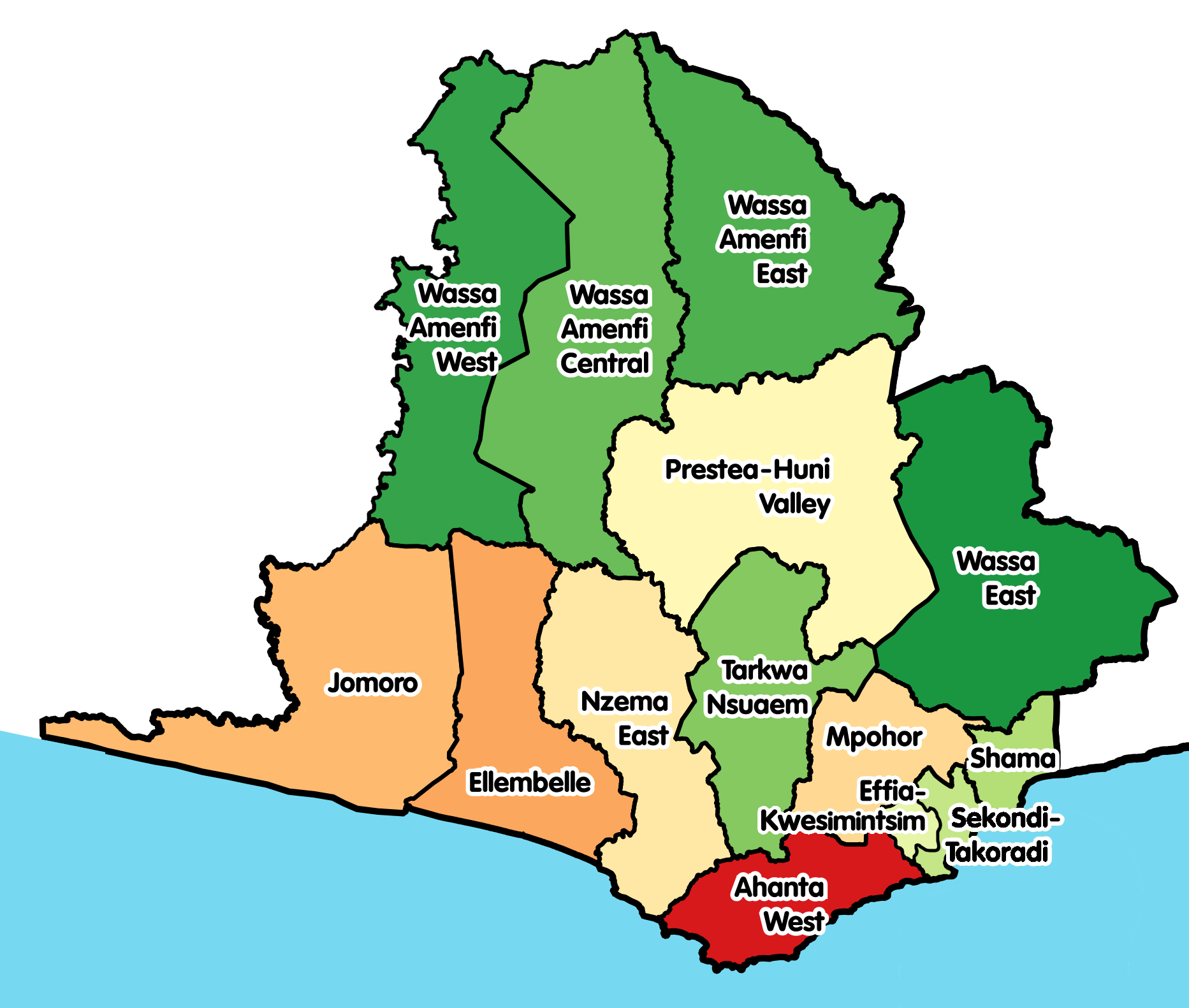
- Districts of Western Region

- Location of Wassa East District within Western
- Coordinates: 5°8′19.32″N 1°39′36″W
- Country: Ghana
- Region: Western
- Capital: Daboase

Government
  - District Executive: Wilson Arthur

Area
  - Total: 2,073 km^{2} (800 sq mi)

Population (2021)
  - Total: 99,641
- Time zone: UTC+0 (GMT)
- ISO 3166 code: GH-WP-WE

Wassa East District is one of the fourteen districts in Western Region, Ghana. Originally it was formerly part of the then-larger Mpohor/Wassa East District in 1988, which was created from the former Wassa-Fiase-Mpohor District Council, until the southwest part of the district was split off to create Mpohor District on 28 June 2012; thus the remaining part has been renamed as Wassa East District. The district assembly is located in the eastern part of Western Region and has Daboase as its capital town.

== Sources ==
- "Districts of Ghana". Statoids.
- GhanaDistricts.com
