= Wassa-Fiase-Mpohor District =

Wassa-Fiase-Mpohor District Council
- Former District Council
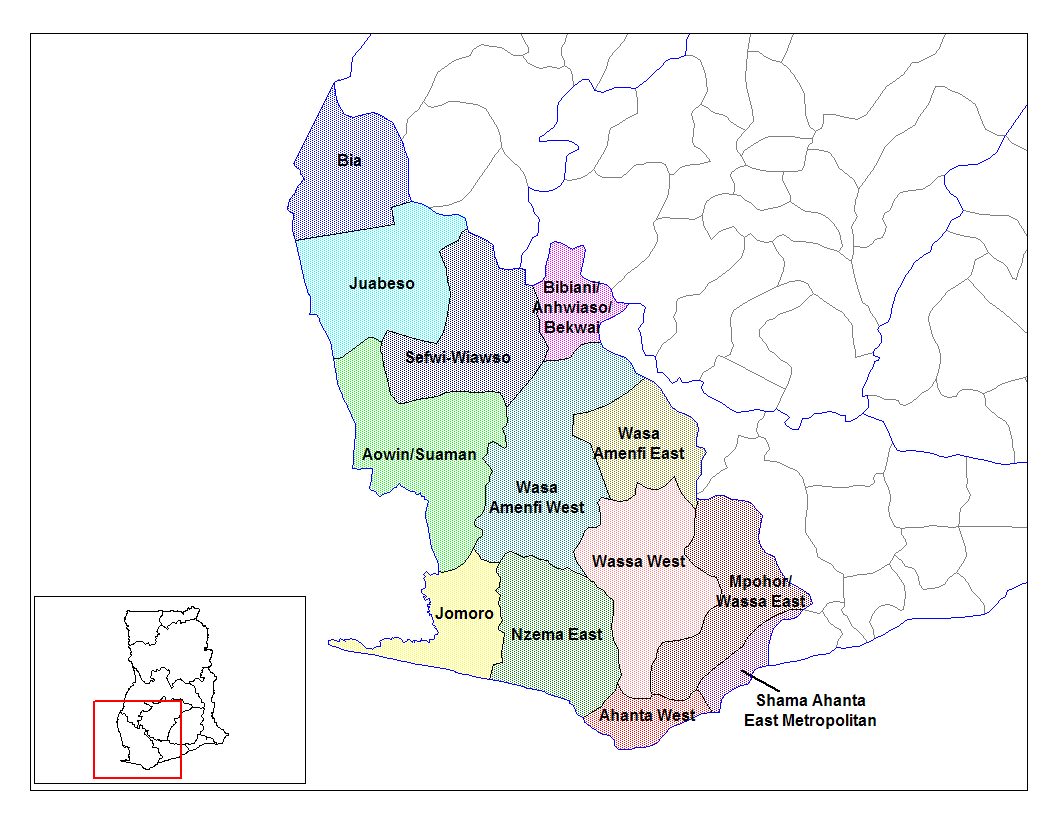
- Districts of Western Region

- Location of Wassa-Fiase-Mpohor District Council within Western
- Coordinates: 5°18′9″N 1°59′14.64″W
- Country: Ghana
- Region: Western
- Capital: Tarkwa
- Time zone: UTC+0 (GMT)
- ISO 3166 code: GH-WP-WF

Wassa-Fiase-Mpohor District is a former district council that was located in Western Region, Ghana. It was originally created as a district council in 1975. However, on 1988, it was split off into two new district assemblies: Wassa West District (capital: Tarkwa) and Mpohor/Wassa East District (capital: Daboase). The district council was located in the eastern part of Western Region and had Tarkwa as its capital town.
