= Mpohor, Ghana =

Mpohor
- Town
- Location of Mpohor
- Coordinates: 4°58′14″N 1°53′34″W
- Country: Ghana
- Region: Western Region
- District: Mpohor
- Elevation: 74 m (243 ft)
- Time zone: GMT
  - Summer (DST): GMT
- Ghana Post GPS: WM
- Area code: +2333120

Mpohor is the administrative capital of the Mpohor District in the Western Region of Ghana. It has been the capital of the district since its creation in 2012. It has a population of about 42,923 people.

The town is at an elevation of 74 metre above sea level.

Mpohor is located north west of Sekondi-Takoradi.

== Schools ==
Mpohor Senior High School

== See also ==
- Mpohor District
