= Daboase =

- District Capital
- Location in Ghana
- Coordinates: 5°8′N 1°39′W
- Country: Ghana
- Region: Western Region
- District: Wassa East
- Elevation: 30 ft (9 m)

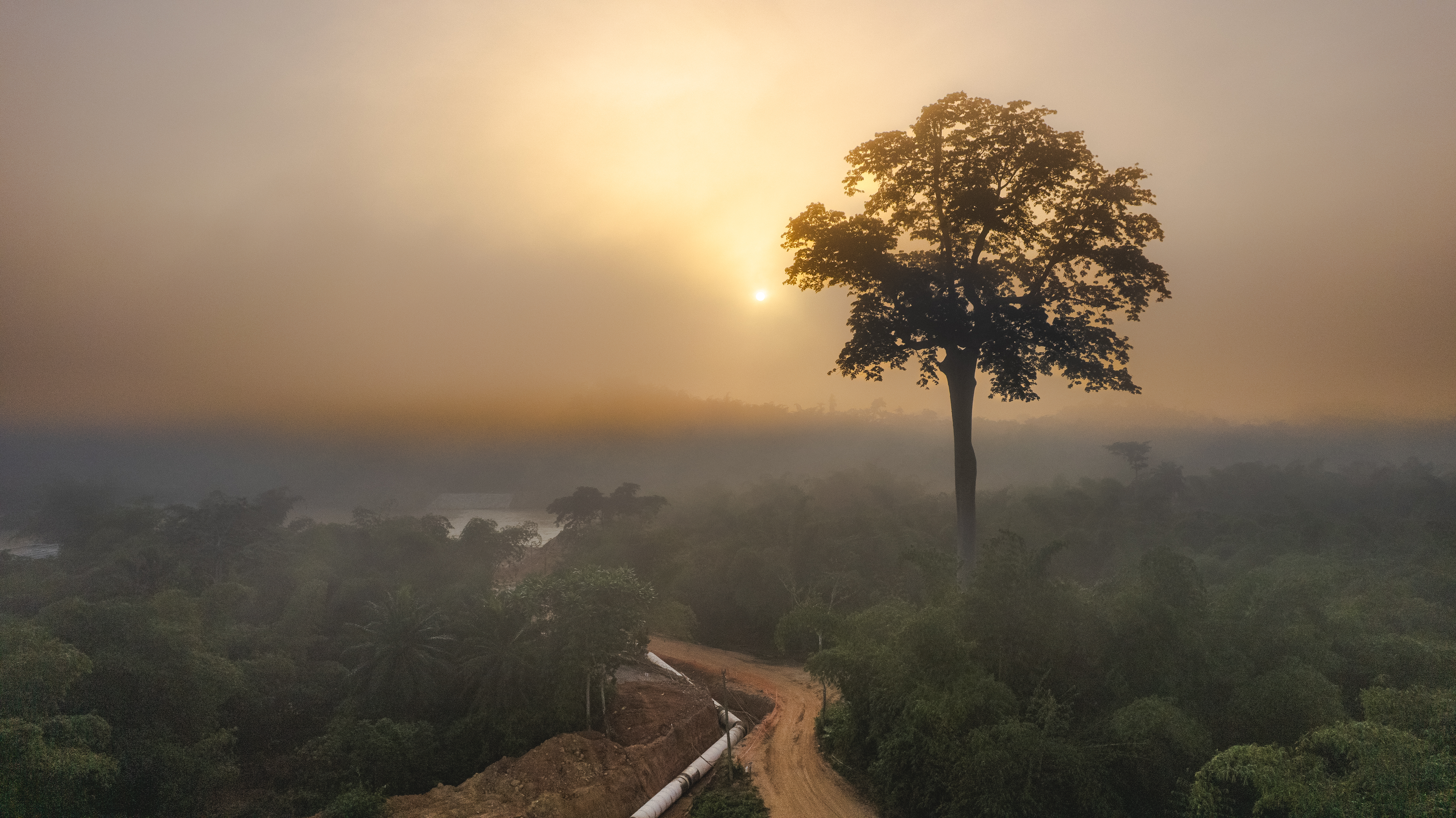
Sunrise near Daboase

Daboase is a town in the western region of Ghana in West Africa and is the capital of Wassa East District, a district in the Western Region of Ghana.
