= University of Mines and Technology =

Public university in Tarkwa, Ghana

Coordinates: 5.29853°N 2.00046°W

- Arms of the University of Mines and Technology
- Motto: Knowledge, Truth and Excellence
- Type: Public
- Established: 1952; 74 years ago as Tarkwa Technical Institute, October 2001/November 2004
- Chancellor: John Kofi Agyekum Kufuor
- Vice-Chancellor: Richard Kwasi Amankwah
- Location: Tarkwa, Western Region, Ghana
- Campus: Suburban area
Colours
Black, white, red, green, and gold
- Website: umat.edu.gh

The University of Mines and Technology (UMaT) is a public university located at Tarkwa in the Western Region of Ghana.

== History ==
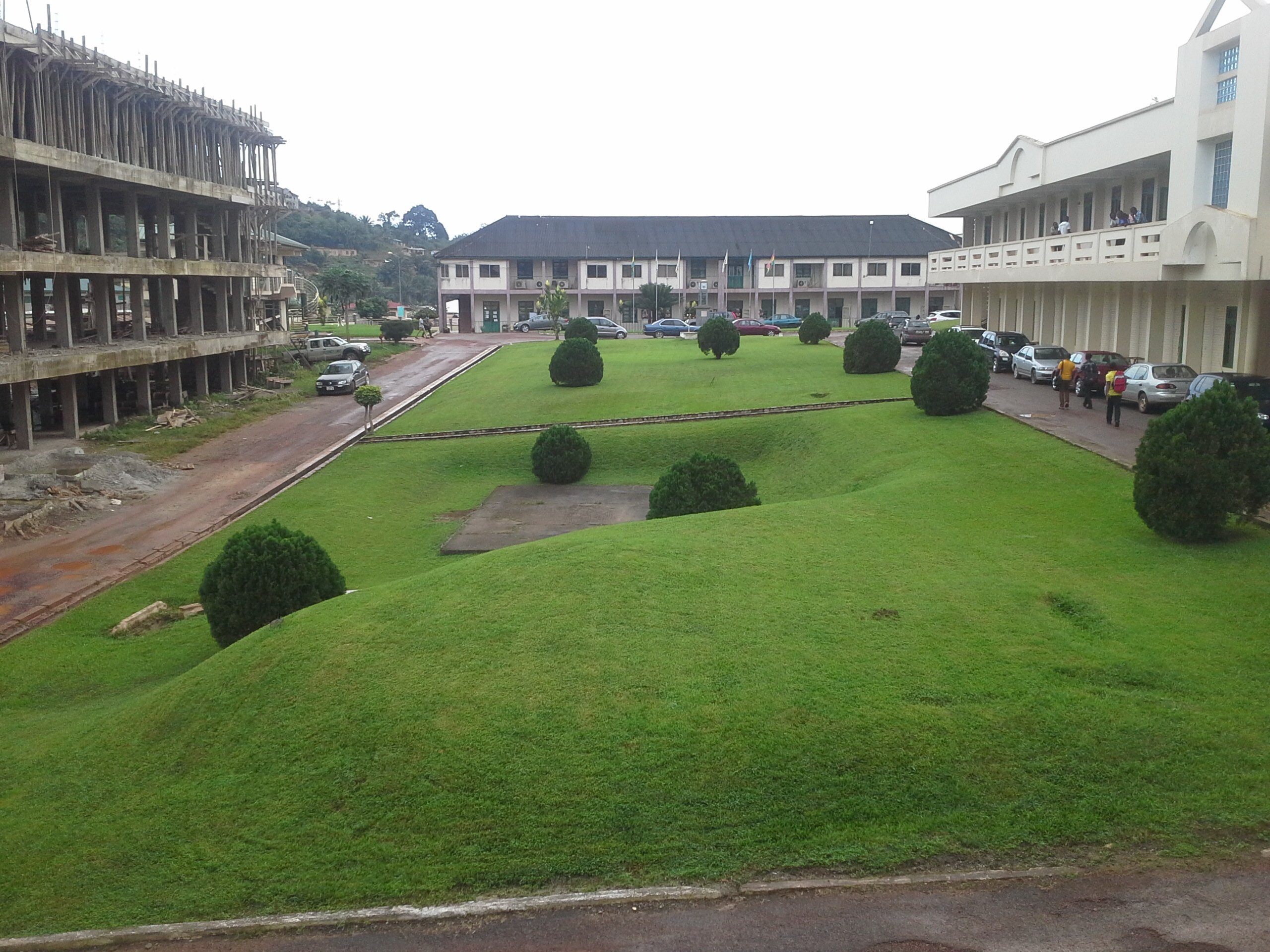
Part of University of Mines and Technology campus

UMaT was first established as the Tarkwa Technical Institute in 1952. In 1961, the university was changed to the Tarkwa School of Mines to help train manpower for the mining industry in Ghana. UMaT became a faculty of the Kwame Nkrumah University of Science and Technology (KNUST) in 1976. On 1 October 2001, UMaT was elevated to university college status and was known as the Western University College of KNUST. UMaT became a fully fledged University in November 2004 by act of Parliament (Act 677). In 2008, the first batch of Students graduated in Tarkwa without going to KNUST for the ceremony. On January 12, 2018, the university was renamed to George Grant University of Mines and Technology in honour of Paa Grant, this however have not practically taken place as of January 2025. In 2021, the university expanded by establishing another campus, the School of Railway and Infrastructural Development (SRID) located at Essikado, Takoradi.

== Faculties ==
=== Faculty of Computing and Mathematical Science ===
- Department of Mathematics
- Department of Computer Science and Engineering

=== Faculty of Engineering ===
The faculty of engineering has the following departments:

- Department of Electrical and Electronic Engineering
- Department of Mechanical Engineering
- Department of Renewable Energy Engineering

=== Faculty of Mineral Resources Technology ===
The faculty of mineral resources technology is the only such one in the West Africa sub-region for training high-level personnel in the mineral industry and continues to attract students from countries in the sub-region and across the Africa continent. The Faculty consists of two (2) Academic Departments which offer the four-year BSc programmes in:

- Department of Mineral Engineering
- Department of Mining Engineering

=== School of Petroleum Studies ===
The GNPC school of petroleum studies has 3 departments under it.

- Department of Petroleum Engineering
- Department of Petroleum Geosciences and Engineering
- Department of Chemical and Petrochemical Engineering Department

=== Faculty of Geosciences and Environmental Studies ===
- Department of Environmental and Safety Engineering
- Department of Geomatic Engineering
- Department of Geological Engineering

Faculty of Integrated Management Science

The Faculty of Integrated Management Science came into operations at the beginning of the 2017/2018 Academic Year. The Faculty consists of two academic departments, namely:

- Department of Technical Communication
- Department of Management Studies

School of Postgraduate Studies

All postgraduate programmes of study in the university may require course work together with research work, leading to the award of the following:

- Postgraduate Diploma (PgD)
- Master of Science (MSc)
- Master of Philosophy (MPhil)
- Doctor of Philosophy (PhD)

Past Principals and Vice Chancellors

- Prof. J.S.Y. Kuma (Vice Chancellor)
- Prof. Daniel Mireku-Gyimah (Vice Chancellor)
- Dr. John Kofi Borsah (Principal)
- Mr. Michael Tettey Kofi
- Mr. F. W. Philpott

== See also ==
- List of universities in Ghana
