= Prestea-Huni Valley Municipal District =

Municipal district in Western region, Ghana

- Municipal District
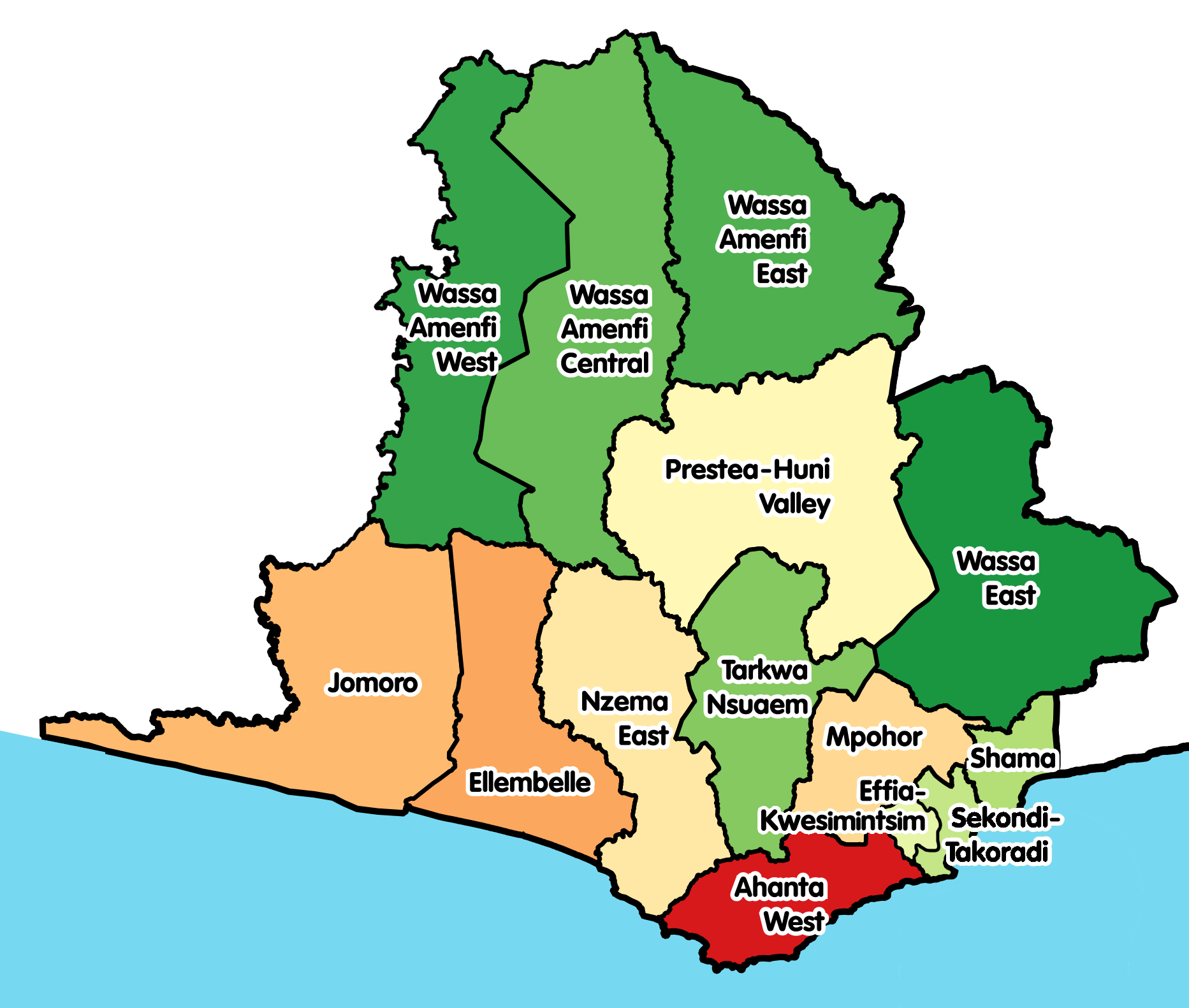
- Districts of Western Region

- Location of Prestea-Huni Valley Municipal District within Western
- Coordinates: 5°34′7.32″N 2°0′55.8″W
- Country: Ghana
- Region: Western
- Capital: Bogoso

Government
  - Municipal Chief Executive: Dr. Matthew Ayeh
  - Member of Parliament: Robert Wisdom Cudjoe

Area
  - Total: 1,791 km^{2} (692 sq mi)

Population (2021)
  - Total: 229,301
  - Density: 128.0/km^{2} (331.6/sq mi)
- Time zone: UTC+0 (GMT)
- ISO 3166 code: GH-WP-PV
- Website: https://phma.gov.gh

Prestea-Huni Valley Municipal District is one of the fourteen districts in Western Region, Ghana. Originally it was part of the then-larger Wassa West District in 1988, which was created from the former Wassa-Fiase-Mpohor District Council, until the northern part of the district was split off to create Prestea-Huni Valley District on 29 February 2008; thus the remaining part was renamed as Tarkwa-Nsuaem District (which was later elevated to municipal district assembly status on that same year to become Tarkwa-Nsuaem Municipal District). However, on 15 March 2018, it was later elevated to municipal district assembly status by President Nana Addo Dankwah Akuffo-Addo to become Prestea-Huni Valley Municipal District. The municipality is located in the eastern part of Western Region and has Bogoso as its capital town.

== Settlements ==
It has four major towns namely, Prestea, Huni Valley, Aboso and Bogoso. It also has about 29 villages and small-town notables including Damang and Bondaye which are all mining towns.

== Education ==
The municipal has three secondary schools namely, St. Augustine's senior high school, Huni Valley senior high school and Prestea senior high technical school.

== Resources ==
The municipal is rich in gold and cocoa, timber and magnesium.

It also have a historical site at Atwereboana, for the war of nsaman k), and the death place for Sir Guggesberg.

== Sources ==
- "Districts of Ghana". Statoids.
- GhanaDistricts.com
