= Tarkwa =

- Town
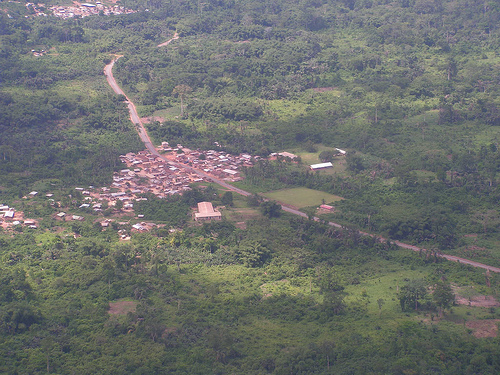

- Tarkwa-Nsuaem Municipal District logo

- Location of Tarkwa in Western region, South Ghana
- Coordinates: 05°18′00″N 01°59′00″W
- Country: Ghana
- Region: Western Region
- District: Tarkwa-Nsuaem Municipal

Population (2013)
  - Total: 34,941
- Time zone: GMT
  - Summer (DST): GMT

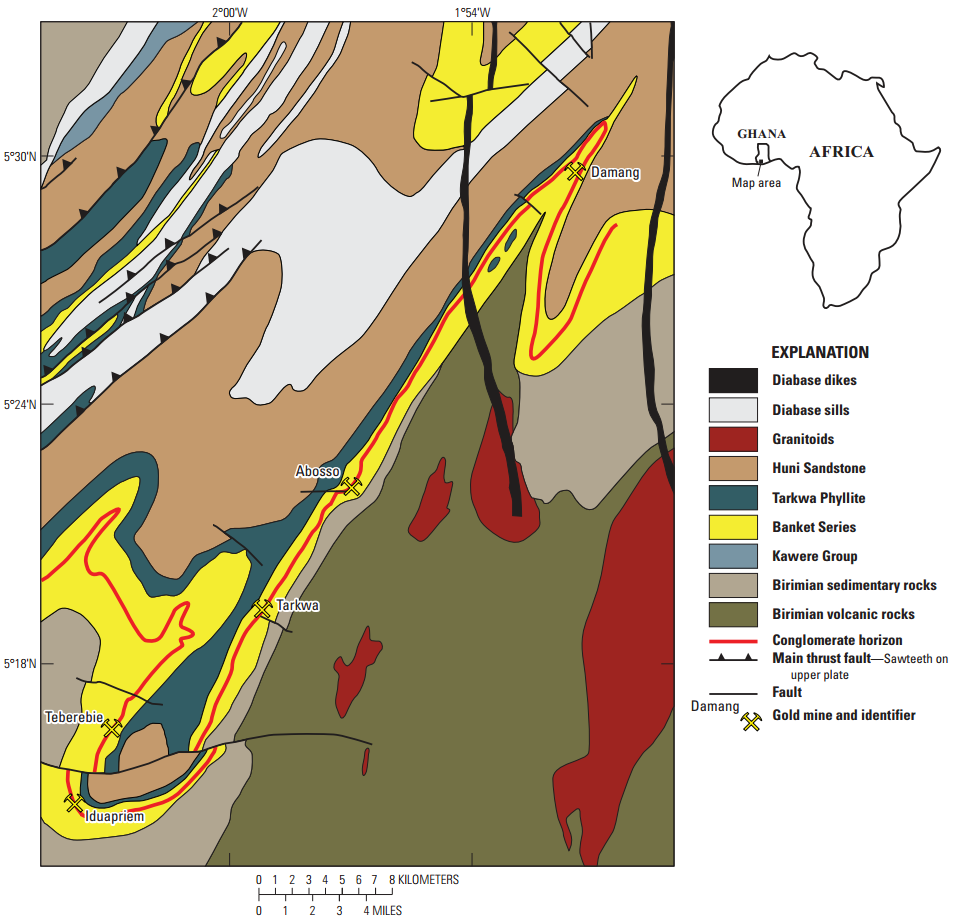
Geological map of the Tarkwa gold district in Ghana showing significant folding and faulting

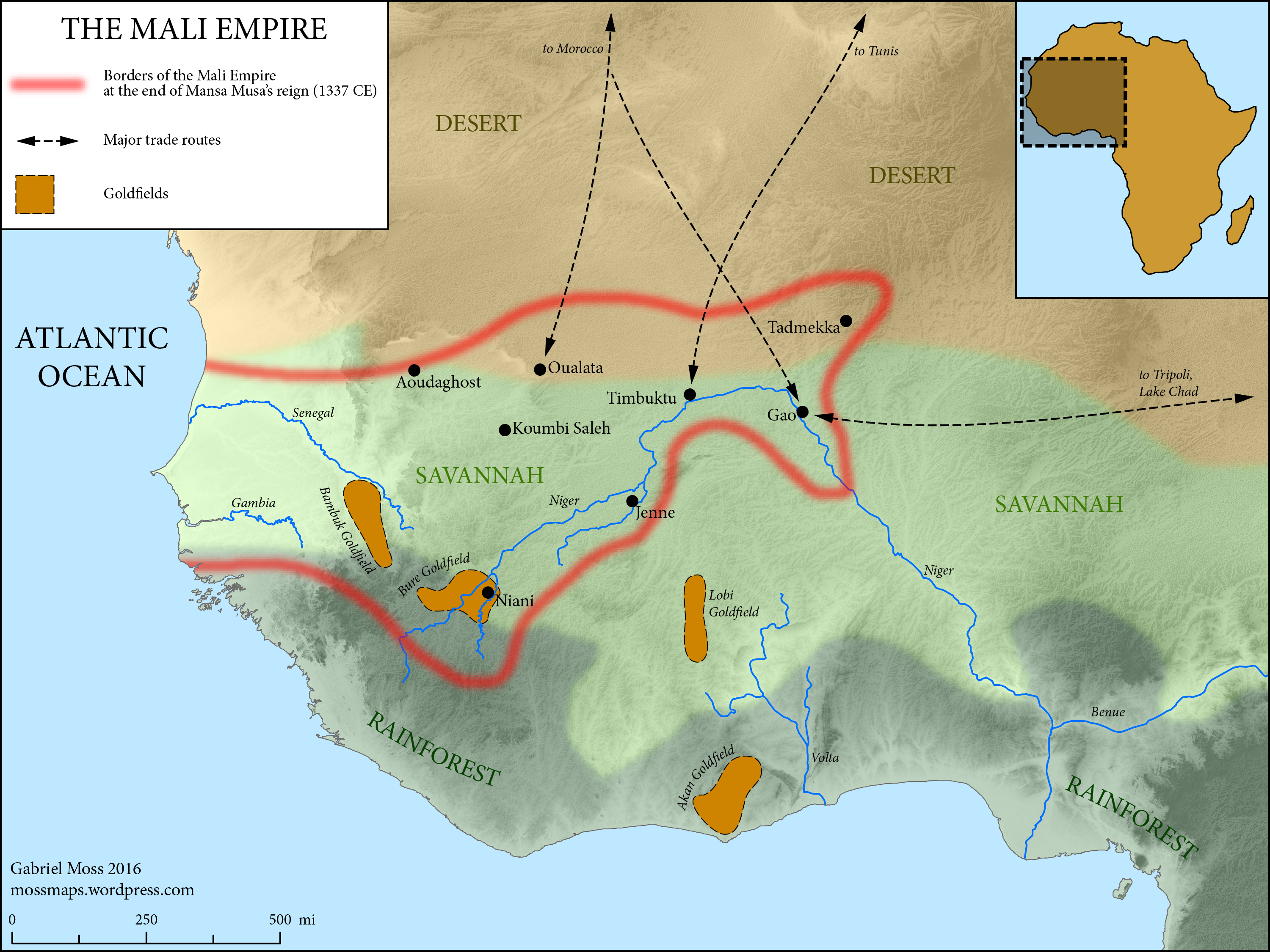
The Mali Empire in 1337, including the location of the Bambuk, Bure, Lobi and Akan Goldfields

Tarkwa is a town and is the capital of Tarkwa-Nsuaem Municipal District, a district in the Western Region southwest of South Ghana. Frequently dubbed as the "Golden City" by its indigenous populace, the region is characterized by a rich tapestry of Fante communities, among which include Efuanta, Tamso, Aboso, Akoon, Nzemaline,Bogrekrom, and Kwabedu.

Tarkwa has a population of 218,664 people according to 2021 settlement.

== Economy ==
=== Mining ===
Tarkwa is noted as a centre of gold mining and manganese mining. Tarkwa mine, which is a large open-cast gold mine, is situated to the northwest of the town, and Nsuta manganese mine is situated to the east of the town. Tarkwa Mine mines several low-grade conglomeratic "reefs" of Tarkwaian type. These reefs are of mid-Proterozoic age.

A number of mining companies cluster between the villages of Aboso and Tamso in the late 19th century.

Tarkwa Mine has the distinction of being one of the largest gold mines in South Ghana. Approximately 24 tons of gold is produced annually, and 100 million tons of earth is moved to achieve this production rate. The Iduapriem Gold Mine is also located near Tarkwa, 10 km south of the town. The Tarkwa Goldfield was discovered a few years before the Witwatersrand Goldfield in South Africa.

There are a number of accidents that have occurred in mining sites in Tarkwa with the latest being recorded on Saturday, September 23, 2023, when a pit caved in, killing 7 people.

Though mining is common in Tarkwa, some areas such as Ndumfri forest reserve are restricted from any mining activity and 3 people were jailed over 60 years for mining in a restricted area in September 2023.

== Climate ==
Climate data for Tarkwa
Month	Jan	Feb	Mar	Apr	May	Jun	Jul	Aug	Sep	Oct	Nov	Dec	Year
Mean daily maximum °C (°F)	32 (89)	32 (90)	32 (90)	31 (87)	32 (89)	30 (86)	27 (80)	27 (80)	29 (84)	30 (86)	31 (87)	30 (86)	32 (90)
Mean daily minimum °C (°F)	24 (75)	25 (77)	25 (77)	25 (77)	25 (77)	24 (75)	23 (73)	22 (71)	22 (72)	24 (75)	24 (76)	23 (74)	22 (72)
Average precipitation mm (inches)	25 (1.0)	25 (1.0)	100 (4.0)	130 (5.0)	200 (8.0)	330 (13.0)	100 (4.0)	25 (1.0)	51 (2.0)	150 (6.0)	130 (5.0)	51 (2.0)	1,320 (52.0)
Source: Myweather2.com

== Education ==
=== High schools ===
Tarkwa Senior High School (TARSCO), Tarkwa Technical Institute (TARKTECH) and Fiaseman Senior High School (FIASEC) are located in Tarkwa.

=== University ===
University of Mines and Technology (UMaT), is located in Tarkwa.

== Transport ==
=== Train ===
Tarkwa is a junction railway station and is served by Tarkwa Train Station on the Ghana Railway Corporation.

== Politics ==
Tarkwa is the main political region of the Tarkwa-Nsuaem Municipal Assembly. Tarkwa Nsuaem is a parliamentary constituency in the Western Region of Ghana, recognized for its contributions to the country's mining sector. Politically, it has consistently supported the New Patriotic Party (NPP), which has won the parliamentary seat in the last five consecutive elections. The constituency's political landscape is marked by high voter turnout and a history of strong support for the NPP.

During election periods, the area sees active engagement from candidates representing various political parties. It was considered a stronghold of the New Patriotic Party (NPP) for nearly three decades, however, in the 2024 elections, the seat was won by the National Democratic Congress (NDC).

=== Member of Parliament ===
- Issah Taylor
- George Mireku Duker (2008–2024)

== Tourism ==
=== Waterfall ===
- UMaT Waterfalls

== Gallery ==
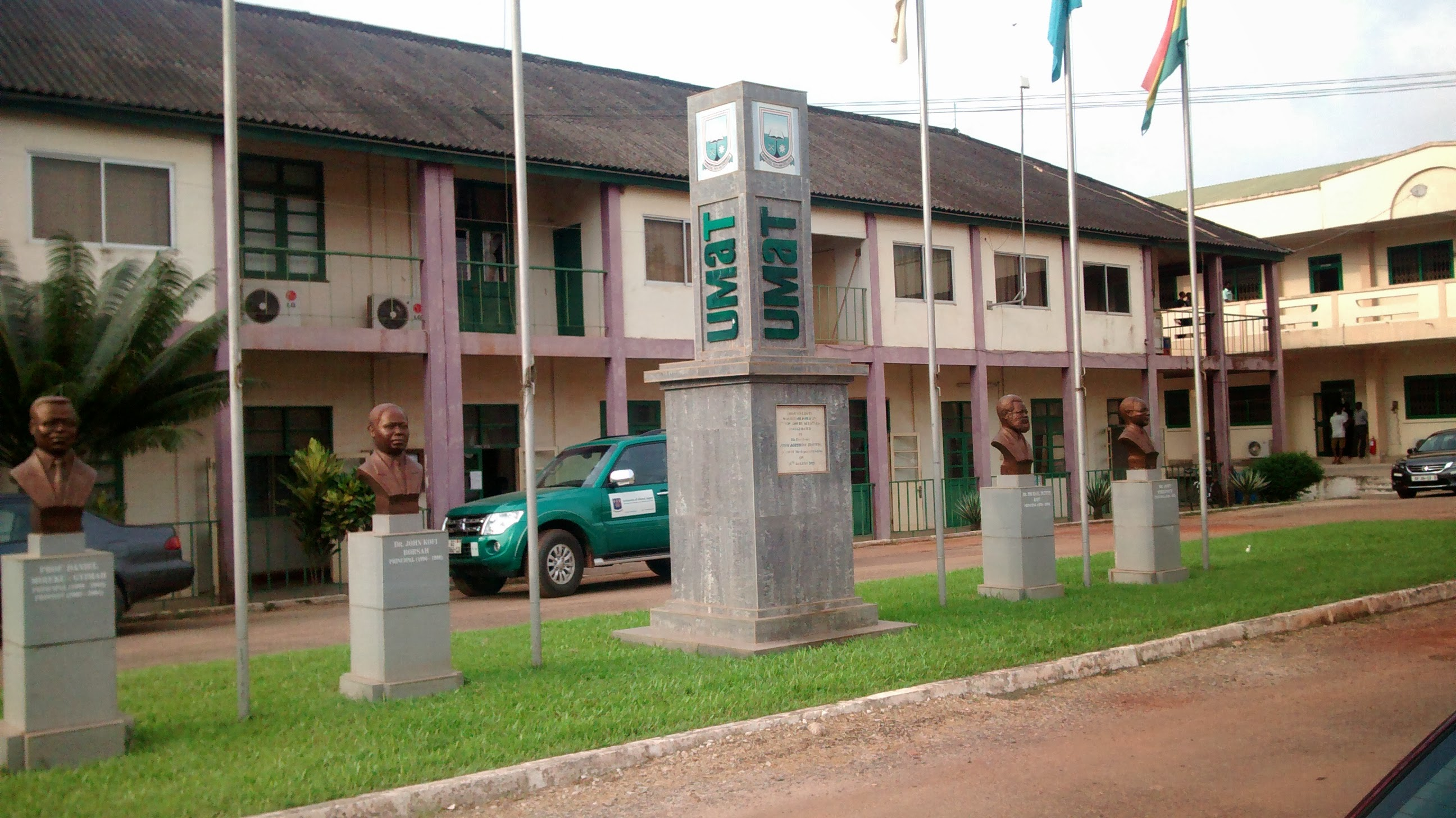
UMaT

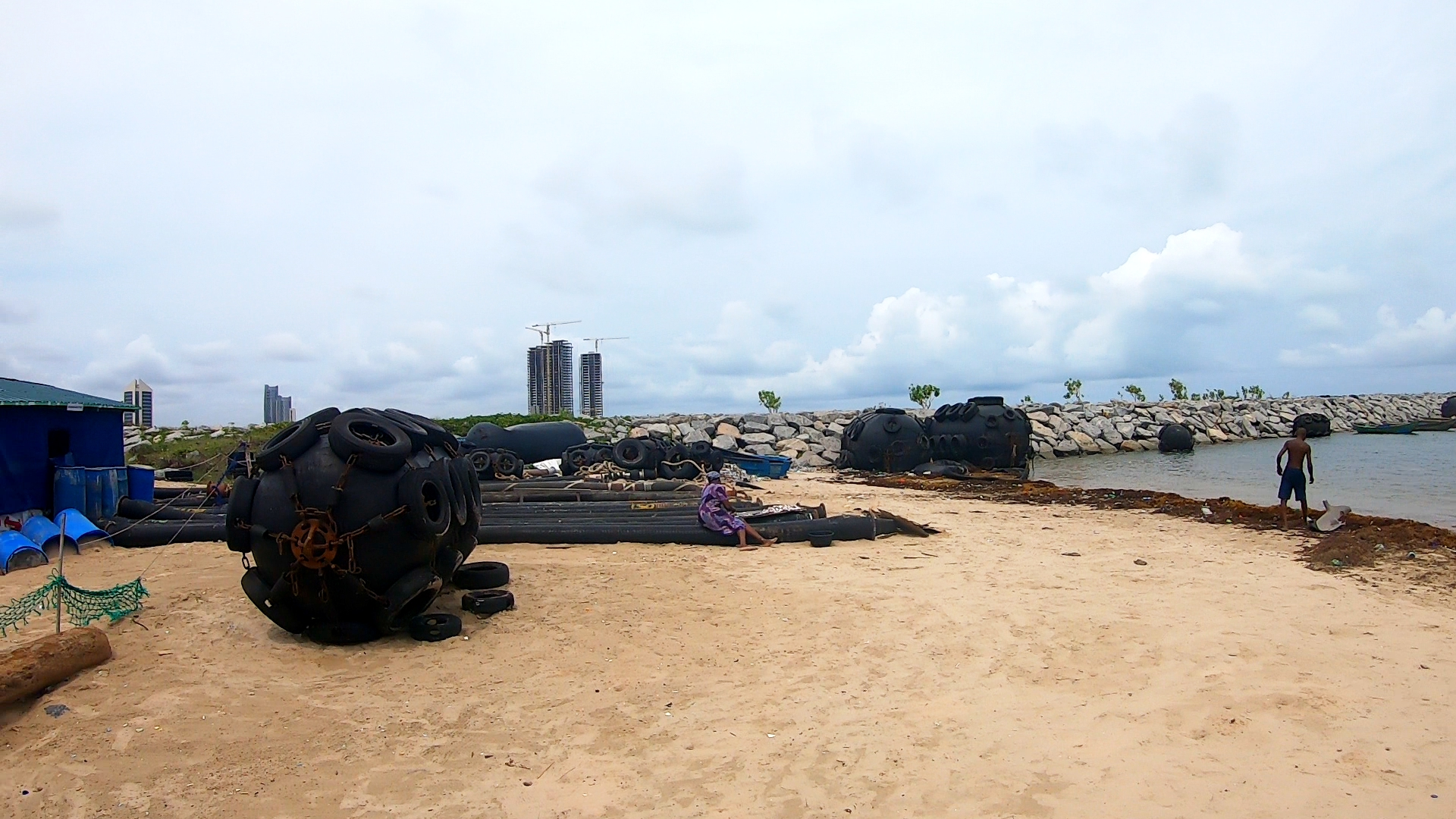
Tarkwa beach bay

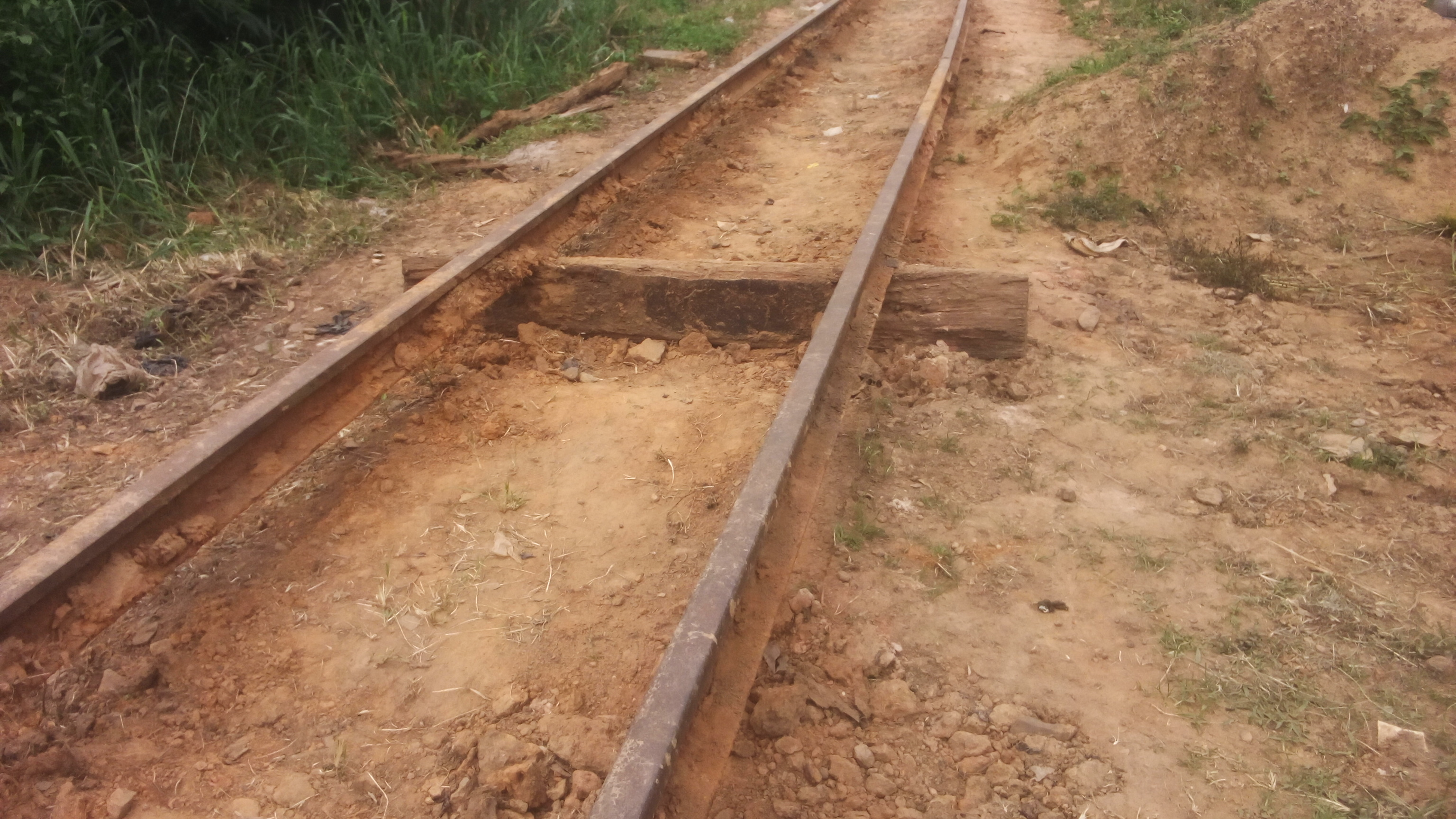
Tarkwa railway

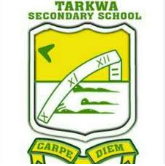
Badge of Tarkwa sec sch.

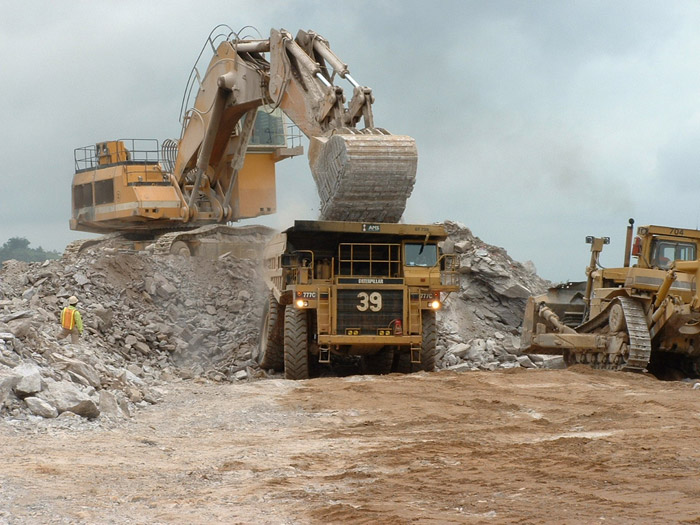
Tarkwa mining

== See also ==
- Railway stations in Ghana
- Geology of Ghana
- Birimian
- Akan goldweights
