= Suaman (Ghana parliament constituency) =

Parliamentary constituency in Ghana

- constituency for the Parliament of Ghana
- District: Aowin/Suaman District
- Region: Western North Region of Ghana

Current constituency
- Created: 2004
- Party: National Democratic Congress
- MP: Stephen Michael Essuah Kofi Ackah

Suaman is one of the constituencies represented in the Parliament of Ghana. It elects one Member of Parliament (MP) by the first past the post system of election. Suaman is located in the Aowin/Suaman district of the Western North Region of Ghana.

== Boundaries ==
The seat is located within the Aowin/Suaman District of the Western North Region of Ghana. It was formed prior to the 2004 December presidential and parliamentary elections by the division of the old Aowin-Suaman constituency into the new Suaman and Aowin constituencies.

== Members of Parliament ==
First elected	Member	Party
Aowin - Suaman constituency
1992	Arthur Sibieko Bullu	National Democratic Congress
1996	John Kwekuchur Ackah	National Democratic Congress
Suaman constituency
2004	Stephen Michael Essuah Kofi Ackah	National Democratic Congress
2020	Joseph Betino	National Democratic Congress
2024	Frederick Addy	New Patriotic Party

== Elections ==
=== 2024 ===
Candidate	Party	Votes	%
Frederick Addy	New Patriotic Party	9,027	52.17
Joseph Betino	National Democratic Congress	8,214	47.47
John Asare	Liberal Party of Ghana	61	0.35
Total		17,302	100.00
Valid votes		17,302	98.90
Invalid/blank votes		193	1.10
Total votes		17,495	100.00
Registered voters/turnout		24,710	70.80
Source: 3 News

=== 2004 ===
Candidate	Party	Votes	%
Stephen Michael Essuah Kofi Ackah	National Democratic Congress	6,931	57.79
Kojo Kwarteng	New Patriotic Party	5,063	42.21
Total		11,994	100.00
Source: Electoral Commission of Ghana

== See also ==
- List of Ghana Parliament constituencies
