= George Kofi Arthur =

Ghanaian politician

Member of the Ghana Parliament for Amenfi Central Constituency
- In office 2012–2016

Personal details
- Born: 24 February 1969 (age 57)
- Party: National Democratic Congress
- Education: University of Education, Winneba, Ghana Institute of Management and Public Administration

George Kofi Arthur (born 24 February 1969) is a Ghanaian politician. He was a member of the Sixth Parliament of the Fourth Republic representing the Amenfi Central Constituency in the Western region of Ghana.

== Personal life ==
Arthur is single. He identifies as a Christian.

== Early life and education ==
Arthur was born on 24 February 1969 in Agona Amenfi in Western region. He attended University of Education, Winneba where he acquired a Bachelor of Education degree in technology. He also attended Ghana Institute of Management and Public Administration where he obtained an EMGL in 2008.

== Employment ==
Arthur is an educationist. He worked as the managing director for Mynd FM in Kumasi. In 2005, he became a member of the Parliament of Ghana.

== Politics ==
Arthur is a member of the National Democratic Congress. In 2004, he contested for the seat of the Amenfi Central Constituency in the 2004 Ghanaian general elections and won. He garnered 14,139 votes which represented 48.10% of the total votes cast and hence defeated the other contestants including Peter Yaw Kwakye-Ackah and James Boateng. He was reelected in the 2008 Ghanaian general elections and the 2012 Ghanaian general elections which gave him the chance to represent his constituency for the second and third term.

=== 2004 Elections ===
Arthur was elected in the 2004 Ghanaian general elections on the ticket of the National Democratic Congress. He thus represented the Amenfi Central Constituency in the 4th parliament of the 4th republic of Ghana from 7 January 2005 to 6 January 2009. He was elected over Pater Yaw Kwakye-Ackah of the New Patriotic Party and James Boateng of the Convention People's Party. These obtained 47.7% and 4.2% respectively of the total valid votes cast.

=== 2008 Elections ===
Arthur was re-elected in the 2008 Ghanaian general elections. He thus re-represented the Amenfi Central Constituency in the 5th parliament of the 4th republic of Ghana from 7 January 2009 to 6 January 2013. He was elected with 39.31% of the total valid votes cast. He was elected on the ticket of the National Democratic Congress. He was elected over Padmore Kofi Yonkopa Arthur of the New Patriotic Party, James Boateng of the Convention People's party and Peter Yaw Kwakye Ackah an independent candidate,. These obtained 33.2 5, 0.7% and 26.7% of the total valid votes cast.
