= Aowin/Suaman District =

- Former District
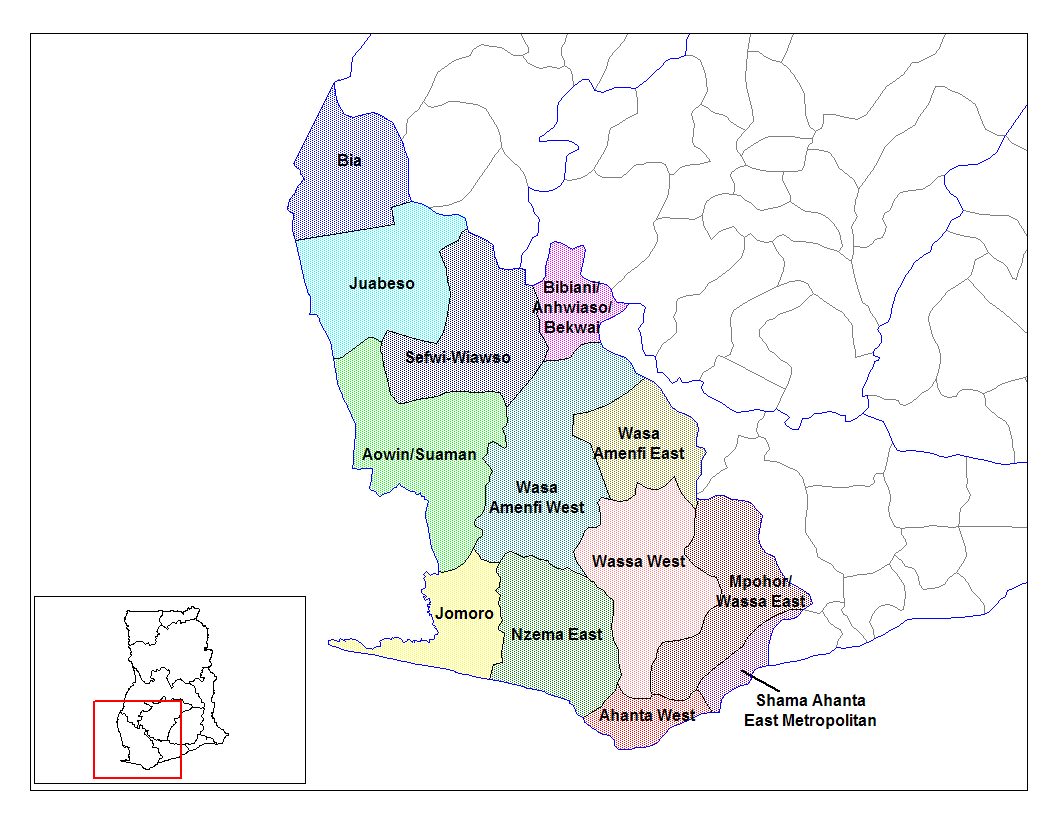
- Districts of Western North Region

- Location of Aowin/Suamin District within Western North
- Coordinates: 5°49′05″N 2°49′26″W
- Country: Ghana
- Region: Western North
- Capital: Enchi

Government
  - District Executive: Samuel Adu-Gyamfi

Area
  - Total: 2,638 km^{2} (1,019 sq mi)

Population (2021 census)
  - Total: 129,721
  - Density: 49.17/km^{2} (127.4/sq mi)
- Time zone: UTC+0 (GMT)
- ISO 3166 code: GH-WP-AS

Aowin/Suaman District is a former district in Western Region (now currently in Western North Region), Ghana. It was originally created as an ordinary district assembly in 1988, which was created from the former Aowin-Amenfi District Council. However, on 28 June 2012, it was split off into two new districts: Aowin Municipal District (which it was elevated to municipal district assembly status on 16 November 2017 (effectively 15 March 2018); capital: Enchi) and Suaman District (capital: Dadieso). The district assembly was located in the western part of Western Region and had Enchi as its capital town.

== Geography ==
Aowin/Suaman District shared common boundaries with Wassa Amenfi, Jomoro, Sefwi-Wiawso and Juabeso-Bia Districts. It was bordered by Côte d'Ivoire to the west. The two main rivers were Tano and Bia, and along with numerous tributaries there were perennials which drained the district all year round.

== Sources ==
- "Districts of Ghana". Statoids.
- GhanaDistricts.com
