= Wassa Amenfi East Municipal District =

Municipal district in Western region, Ghana

- Municipal District
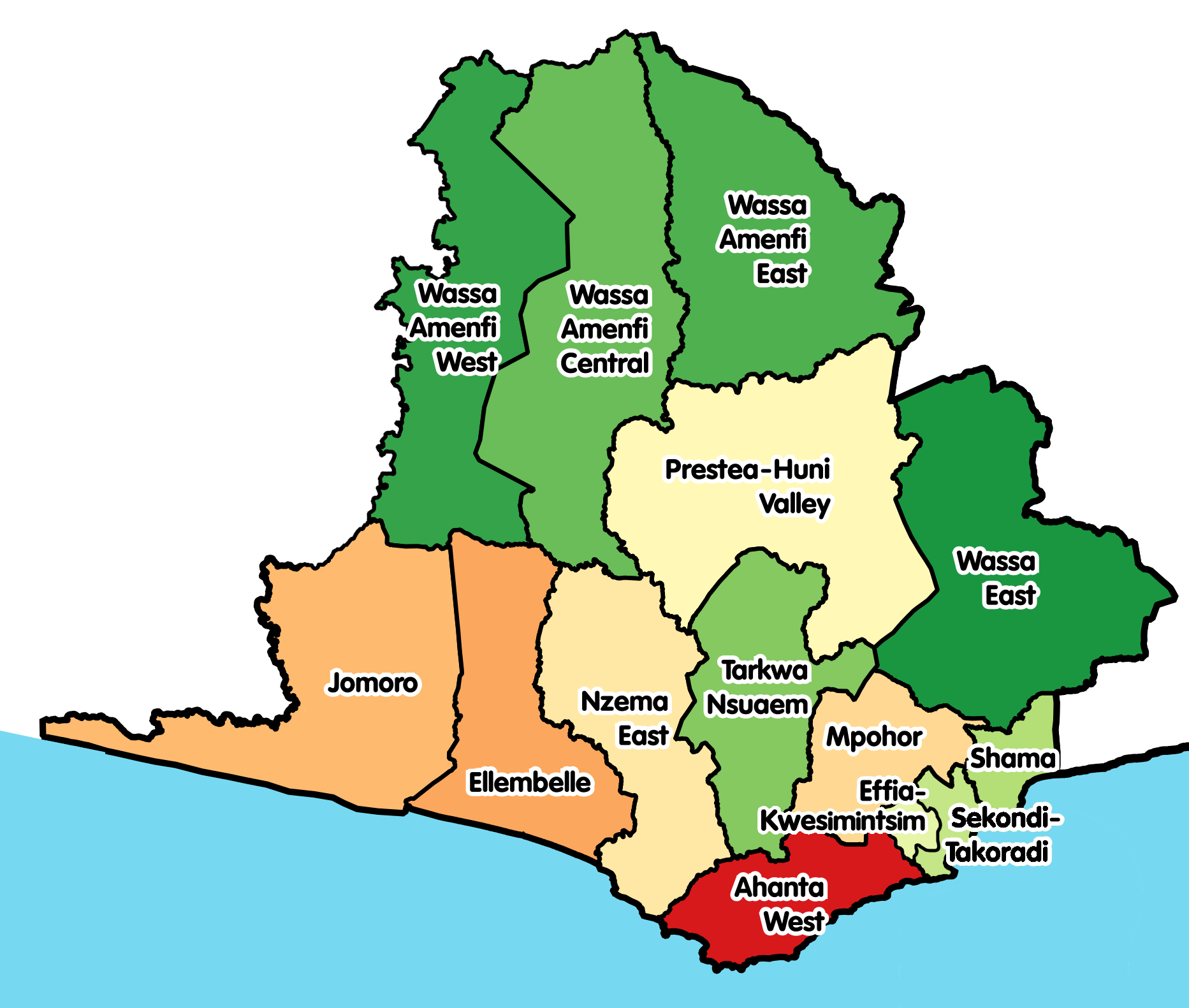
- Districts of Western Region

- Location of Wassa Amenfi East Municipal District within Western
- Coordinates: 5°46′22.8″N 2°5′31.2″W
- Country: Ghana
- Region: Western
- Capital: Wassa-Akropong

Government
  - Municipal Chief Executive: Hon. Helena Appiah

Area
  - Total: 1,729 km^{2} (668 sq mi)

Population (2021 census)
  - Total: 179,696
  - Density: 103.9/km^{2} (269.2/sq mi)
- Time zone: UTC+0 (GMT)
- ISO 3166 code: GH-WP-WE

Wassa Amenfi East Municipal District is one of the fourteen districts in Western Region, Ghana. Originally it was formerly part of the then-larger Wassa Amenfi District in 1988, which was created from the former Aowin-Amenfi District Council, until the eastern part of the district was split off to create Wassa Amenfi East District in August 2004; thus the remaining part has been renamed as Wassa Amenfi West District. However, on 15 March 2018, it was later elevated to municipal district assembly status to become Wassa Amenfi East Municipal District. The municipality is located in the northern part of Western Region and has Wassa-Akropong as its capital town.

== Sources ==
- "Districts of Ghana". Statoids.
- GhanaDistricts.com
