= Asankrangwa Senior High School =

Asankrangwa Senior High Technical School
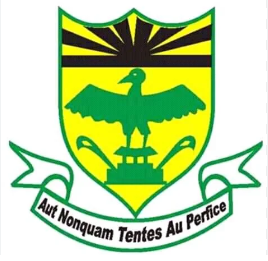
- Asankragwa, Wassa Amenfi West District, Western Region; Ghana

Information
- Type: secondary/high school
- Motto: Aut Nonquam Tentes Au Perfice (Attempt Not or Persevere)
- Denomination: Non-Denominational
- Established: 1960 (66 years ago)
- School district: Wassa Amenfi West District
- Grades: Forms [1-3]
- Nickname: ASECTECH

Asankrangwa Senior High School (now Asankrangwa Senior High Technical School also known as ASECTECH) is a mixed-gendered second cycle institution located in Asankragwa in the Wassa Amenfi West District in the Western Region of Ghana. Asankrangwa Senior High Technical is one of the senior high schools in the Western Region, serving the Asankragwa community.

== History ==
The school was established in 1991 as a result of the 1987 Educational Reforms Programmes where some of the Experimental and Ordinary Junior High Schools were being converted into second-cycle instituitons in Ghana. In the case of ASECTECH it was the then Buadum Middle School which was upgraded by the Ministry of Education as a Vocational/Technical (VOTECH) Resource Centre with the goal of providing training for the youth in skills acquisition which has grown to the present state.

== School code ==
The Ghana Education Service has assigned the code 0040501 for administrative purposes, including student registrations, placements, and national examinations such as the West African Senior School Certificate Examination (WASSCE) to Asankrangwa Senior High Technical School.

== School motto ==
The official motto of Anlo Senior High School is Aut Nonquam Tentes Au Perfice which translates in English as Attempt Not or Persevere.

== Academic programs and extra-curricular activities ==
Asankrangwa Senior High Technical School functions within the standard three-year Senior High School (SHS) curriculum framework established by Ghana's National Council for Curriculum and Assessment (NaCCA). Currently, ASECTECH runs six programs which include the following;

- Agriculture
- Business
- Home Economics
- Visual Arts
- General Arts
- General Science

== Facilities ==
Asectech has the following facilities;

- Science Laboratories
- Library
- Dining Hall
- Dormitories (Boys and Girls)
- ICT/computer laboratory
- Technical Workshop
