= Sefwi-Wiawso (Ghana parliament constituency) =

Parliamentary constituency in Ghana

- constituency for the Parliament of Ghana
- District: Sefwi-Wiawso District
- Region: Western North Region of Ghana

Current constituency
- Party: National Democratic Congress
- MP: Kofi Benteh Afful

Sefwi-Wiawso is a parliamentary constituency in the Western North Region of Ghana. The member of parliament for the constituency is Kwaku Afriyie, who was elected on the ticket of the New Patriotic Party (NPP) in the 2016 elections.

== Members of Parliament ==
First elected	Member	Party	Term
First Republic
1956	William Kwabena Aduhene	Convention People's Party	1956-1965
Second Republic
1969	Sebastian Kwaku Opon	Progress Party	1969-1972
Third Republic
1979	Isaac K. Fuakye	People's National Party	1979-1981
Fourth Republic
1992	John Kweku Danso	National Democratic Congress	1993-1997
1996	Isaac Kobina Nyame-Ofori	National Democratic Congress	1997-2005
2004	Paul Evans Aidoo	National Democratic Congress	2005-2017
2016	Kwaku Afriyie	New Patriotic Party	2017-2025
2024	Kofi Benteh Afful	National Democratic Congress	2025 - present

== See also ==
- List of Ghana Parliament constituencies
