= Aowin Municipal District =

Municipal District in Western North Region, Ghana

- Municipal District
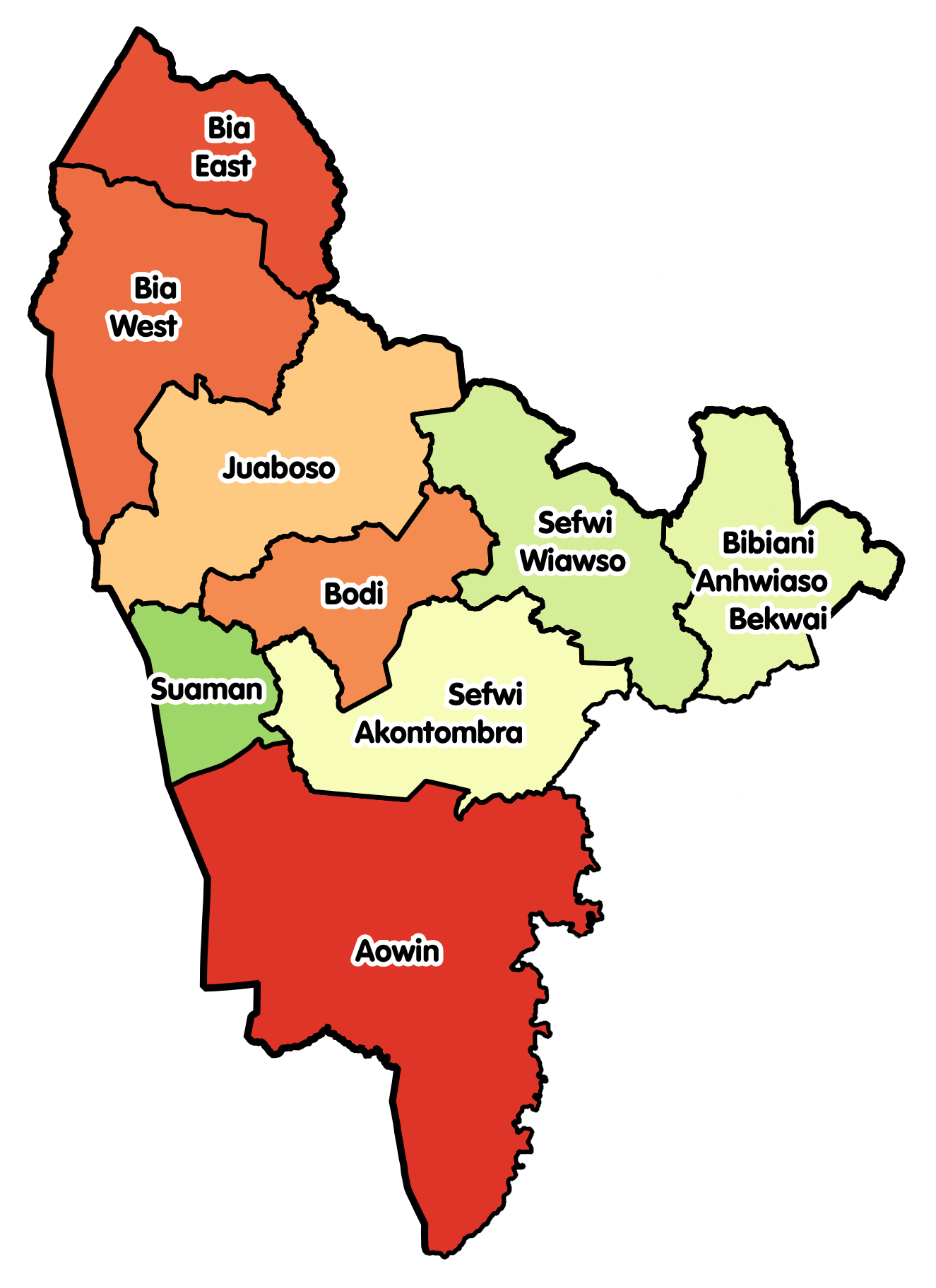
- Districts of Western North Region

- Location of Aowin Municipal District within Western North
- Coordinates: 5°49′05″N 2°49′26″W
- Country: Ghana
- Region: Western North
- Capital: Enchi

Government
  - Municipal Chief Executive: Samuel Adu-Gyamfi
- Time zone: UTC+0 (GMT)
- ISO 3166 code: GH-WP-AO

Aowin Municipal District is one of the nine districts in Western North Region, Ghana. Originally it was formerly part of the then-larger Aowin/Suaman District in 1988, which was created from the former Aowin-Amenfi District Council, until a small northwest part of the district was split off to create Suaman District on 28 June 2012; thus the remaining part has been renamed as Aowin District, which it was later elevated to municipal district assembly status on 16 November 2017 (effective 15 March 2018) to become Aowin Municipal District. The municipality is located in the southern part of Western North Region and has Enchi as its capital town.
