= Obed Ofori Bangdome =

Ghanaian entrepreneur

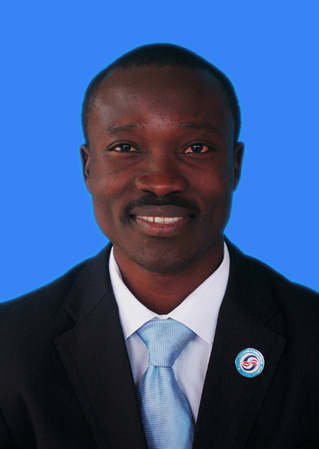
Obed Ofori Bangdome

Obed Ofori Bangdome (born October 10, 1989) popularly known as Taadi Mayor, is an author, entrepreneur and a Senior Technical Officer at the Western Regional Health Directorate.

== Early life ==
Taadi Mayor is a Ghanaian and was born in Subiri-Bibiani to late Eugene Bangdome and Margaret Ofori. He is the last born of their three children.

== Education ==
Bangdome is a product of Asankrangwa Senior High School where he read General Science course. He represented the school in its maiden appearance in the Ghana National Science and Maths Quiz in 2008. He is a graduate of College of Health and Well-being (formerly Kintampo Rural Health Training School) and was the Vice President of the Student Representative Council during his final year.

== National Service and Leadership Position ==
He was among the first batch of health trainees in Ghana who began national service in 2011. Obed was elected the President of National Service Personnel Association (NASPA) for Brong-Ahafo Region and Wenchi municipal. Obed was vociferous on poor working conditions of national service personnel posted to the state farm at Branam in Wenchi. His constant appeal to management to provide appropriate means of transportation to the state farm was granted in 2013 by Lee Ocran who was about leaving office as the Minister of Education. The minister presented 11 Yutong buses to the national service secretariat to transport service persons to the state farms.
