= Kwaku Afriyie =

Ghanaian politician

Hon. Dr Kwaku Afriyie
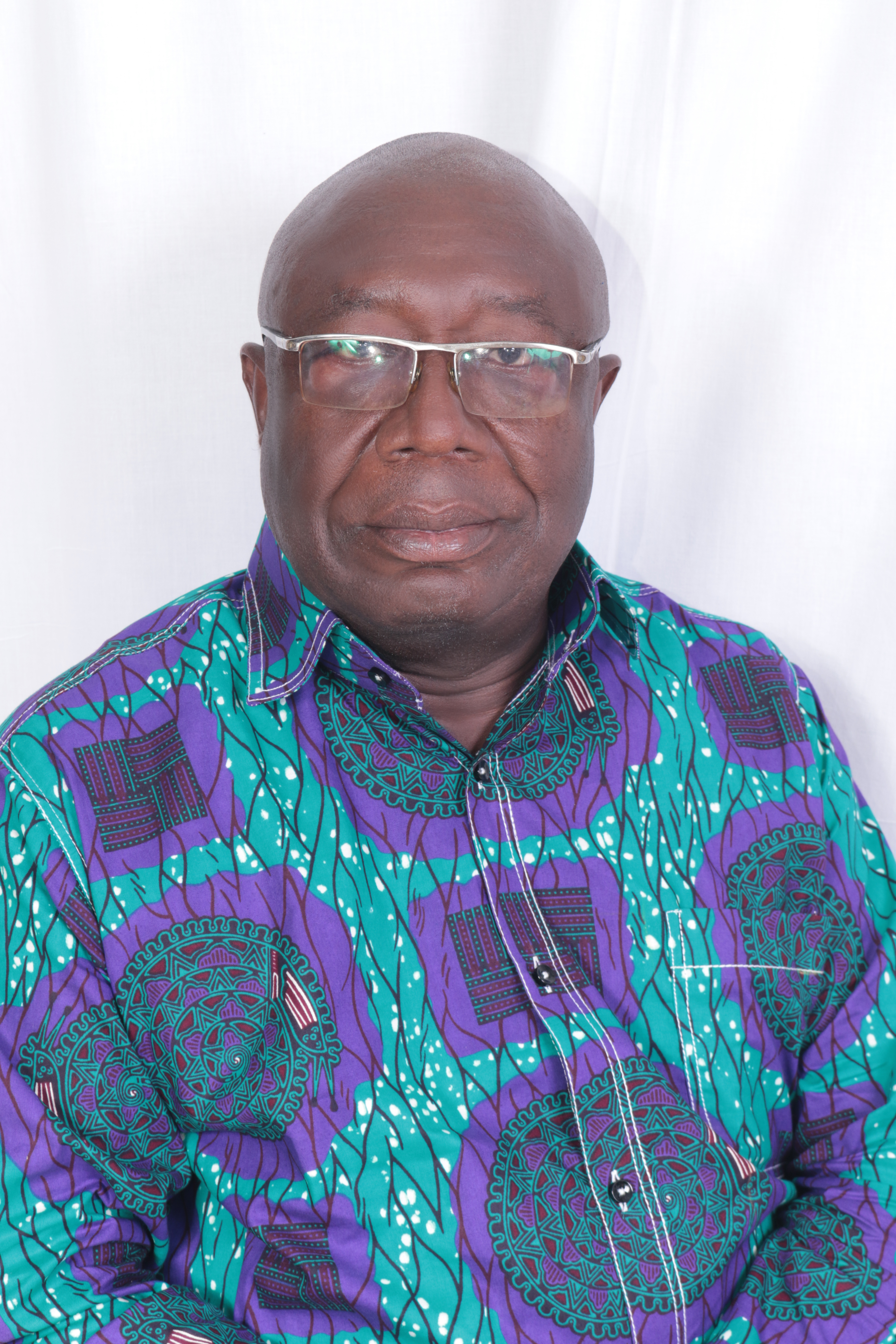

MP for Sefwi-Wiawso
- In office 7 January 2016 – 6 January 2025
- President: Nana Akuffo-Addo
- Preceded by: Paul Evans Aidoo
- Succeeded by: Kofi Benteh Afful

Western Regional Minister
- In office 19 February 2017 – March 2021
- President: Nana Akuffo-Addo
- Preceded by: Kwabena Frimpong-Boateng
- Succeeded by: Ibrahim Murtala Muhammed

Minister for Environment, Science and Technology
- In office March 2021 – 14 February 2024
- President: Nana Akuffo-Addo
- Preceded by: Kwabena Frimpong-Boateng
- Succeeded by: Ibrahim Murtala Muhammed

Personal details
- Born: Kwaku; 7 July 1954 (age 72) Sefwi Wiawso, Ghana
- Party: New Patriotic Party
- Spouse: Adoley Bulley
- Children: 3
- Education: Tulane University; University of Ghana Medical School; St. Augustine’s College
- Occupation: Consultant Physician
- Profession: Medical Doctor / Farmer
- Cabinet: State Interest and Governance Authority (SIGA)
- Committees: Health, Privileges
- Portfolio: Minister of State at the Presidency in charge of SIGA

Kwaku Afriyie (born 7 July 1954) is a Ghanaian politician, farmer and a member of the New Patriotic Party in Ghana. He was the Western Regional minister of Ghana from 2017 to 2018. He was appointed by President Nana Addo Danquah Akuffo-Addo in January 2017 and was approved by the Members of Parliament in February 2017. He was a member of Parliament for Sefwi Wiawso constituency in the Western North Region of Ghana in the 7th and Eighth Parliament of the Fourth Republic of Ghana.

== Early life and education ==
Kwaku Afriyie was born on 7 July 1954, at Sefwi Wiawso, Ghana. He has an MB CBH from the University of Ghana Medical School and a Master of Public Health from Tulane University, New Orleans, United States. He was also a fellow of the Ghana College of Physicians and Surgeons.

== Career ==
Kweku Afriyie began his career as a medical doctor, serving at Korle-Bu Teaching Hospital and Effia Nkwanta Hospital from 1982 to 1994 and was later ascended to the role of Health Service Director at Bibiani Government Hospital. from1990 to 2016 he was the Managing Director of Afriyie Farms

== Politics ==
Afriyie is a member of the New Patriotic Party and the member of Parliament for Sefwi Wiawso constituency in the Western North Region. Between 2001 and 2005, he was part of the Cabinet Sub-committee on Cocoa Affairs during President Kufuor's administration.

=== 2016 election ===
Afriyie contested the Sefwi Wiawso parliamentary seat on the ticket of the New Patriotic Party in the 2016 Ghanaian general election and won the election with 31,736 votes representing 54.29% of the total votes. He won the election over Evans Paul Aidoo of the National Democratic Congress who polled 26,105 votes which is equivalent to 44.66%, parliamentary candidate for the PPP Sebastian Webster Kwasi Andoh had 459 votes representing 0.79%, Baafi Kwame Fairfax of the Convention People's Party had 114 votes representing 0.20% and the parliamentary candidate for the GCPP Prince Akomeah Stephen polled 38 votes representing 0.07% of the total votes.

=== 2020 election ===
During the 2020 Ghanaian general election, Afriyie again contested the Sefwi Wiawso constituency parliamentary seat on the ticket of the New Patriotic Party and won the election with 29,091 votes representing 45.10% of the total votes. He won the election over Aidoo Evans Paul of the National Democratic Congress, Bonye Martin Kofi (IND), Louisa Nkuah Kwayie of the GUM and Prince Akomeah Stephen of the GCPP. They obtained 28,946 votes, 5,733 votes, 576 votes and 69 votes respectively, equivalent to 44.99%, 8.91%, 0.90% and 0.11% of the total votes respectively.

== Personal life ==
He is Christian.
