= Sebastian Kwaku Opon =

Ghanaian politician

Member of the Ghana Parliament for Sefwi Wiawso
- In office 1969–1972
- Preceded by: William Kwabena Aduhene
- Succeeded by: Isaac K. Fuakye

Personal details
- Born: 3 December 1934
- Citizenship: Ghana
- Education: St Augustine's Training College; University of Ghana University of Chicago
- Occupation: Teacher

Sebastian Kwaku Opon (born 3 December 1934) is a Ghanaian politician and member of the first parliament of the second republic of Ghana representing Sefwi Wiawso Constituency under the membership of the Progress Party(PP).

== Early life and education ==
Oppon was born on 3 December 1934. He attended St. Augustine's Training College where he obtained his Teachers' Training Certificate, and the University of Ghana where he was awarded his bachelor's degree. He later went to Chicago to study at the University of Chicago.

== Career and politics ==
Opon was a teacher by profession. He was elected in 1969 as a member of the first parliament of the second republic of Ghana representing the Sefwi Wiawso Constituency on the ticket of the Progress Party (PP). He was elected during the 1969 parliamentary election which was organised on 29 August 1969. He was sworn into office on 1 October 1969, and served in the capacity of a member of parliament for the Sefwi Wiawso Constituency until 13 January 1972 when the Busia government was overthrown.

== Personal life ==
Opon is a Christian.

== See also ==
- Busia government
- List of MPs elected in the 1969 Ghanaian parliamentary election
