= Peter Yaw Kwakye-Ackah =

Ghanaian politician

Hon. Peter Yaw Kwakye-Ackah
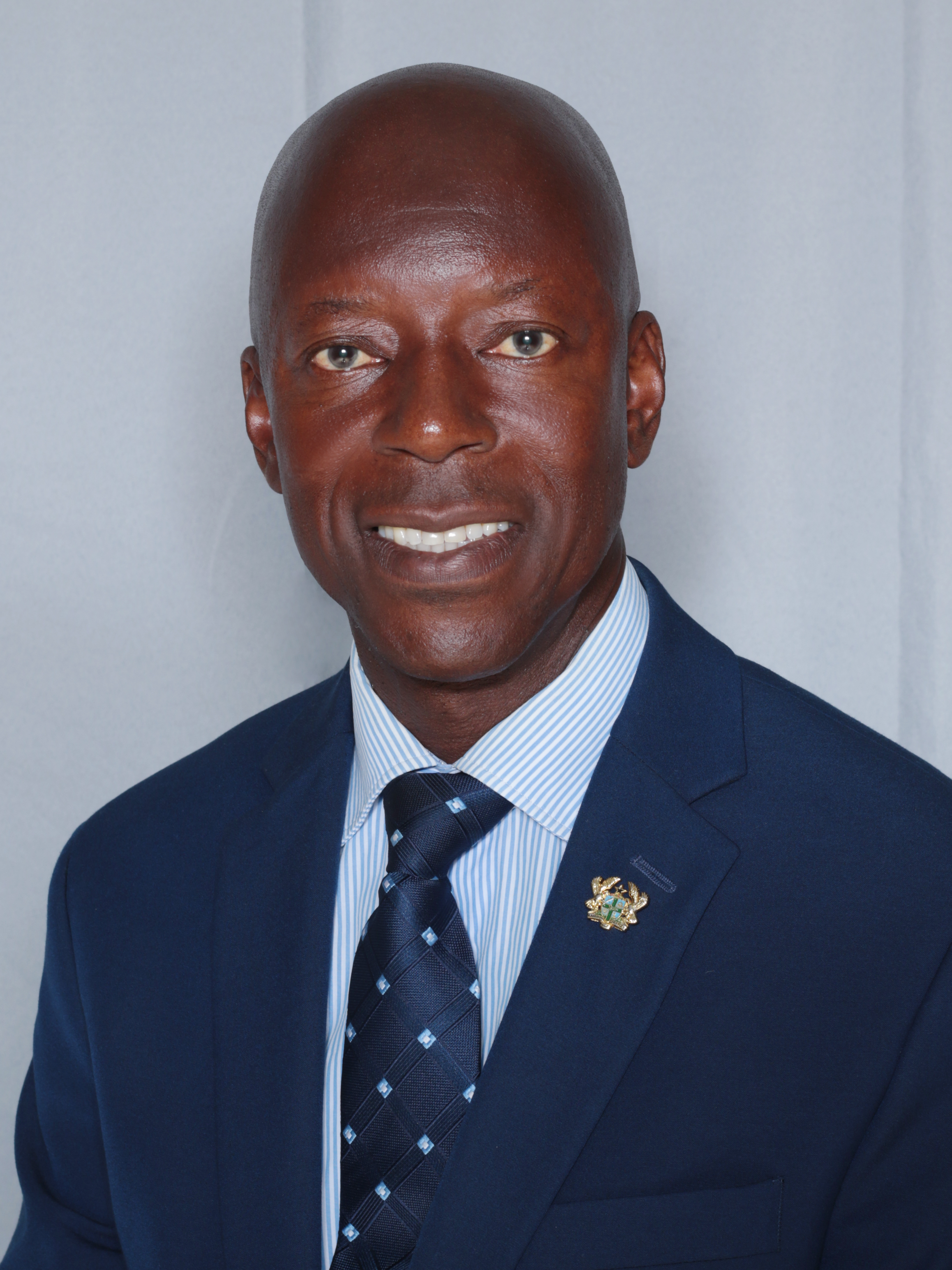

Member of the Ghana Parliament for Amenfi Central
- Incumbent
- Assumed office 7 January 2020
- President: Nana Akufo-Addo

Personal details
- Born: 15 June 1957 (age 69)
- Party: National Democratic Congress (Ghana)
- Committees: Public Accounts Committee, Education Committee

Peter Yaw Kwakye-Ackah (born 15 June 1957) is a Ghanaian politician and member of the Seventh Parliament of the Fourth Republic of Ghana representing the Amenfi Central Constituency in the Western Region on the ticket of the National Democratic Congress. Ahead of the 2024 elections, he decided to contest as an independent candidate after he lost the NDC primaries held on 13 May 2023. On 19 November 2024, he withdrew from the election and endorsed the NDC parliamentary candidate, Joana Gyan Cudjoe.

== Early life and education ==
Kwakye-Ackah hails from Manso-Amenfi. He holds an MBA in Marine Engineering from the Leicester University, UK and 1st Class Marine Engineering South Glamoorgan Institute of Higher Education, Cardiff, Wales (1990). He also holds a Second Marine Engineering Certificate from South Tyneside College, United Kingdom.

== Career ==
He worked as a Chief Engineer at Tidewater Marine in the US from 2007 to 2010. He also worked as Chief Engineer at Ocean Tankers Pte Ltd. in Singapore.

=== Politics ===
In 2012, he was appointed as District Chief Executive at the Ministry of Local Government and Rural Development and served till his tenure was over in 2016. In 2016, he won the member of parliament seat of the Amenfi Central Constituency and was reelected in the 2020 elections on the ticket of the National Democratic Congress. He is part of the Public Accounts Committee and Education Committee in parliament.

He chose to run as an independent candidate for the 2024 elections after losing the NDC primaries on 13 May 2023. On 19 November 2024, he decided to withdraw from the election and supported the NDC candidate, Joana Gyan Cudjoe.
