= Akropong (disambiguation) =

Akropong is a town in south Ghana.

Akropong may also refer to:

- Akropong (Ghana parliament constituency)
- Akropong–Akuapem, a kingdom-state
- Wassa-Akropong, a town
