= Wassa Amenfi District =

Former district in Western region, Ghana

- Former District
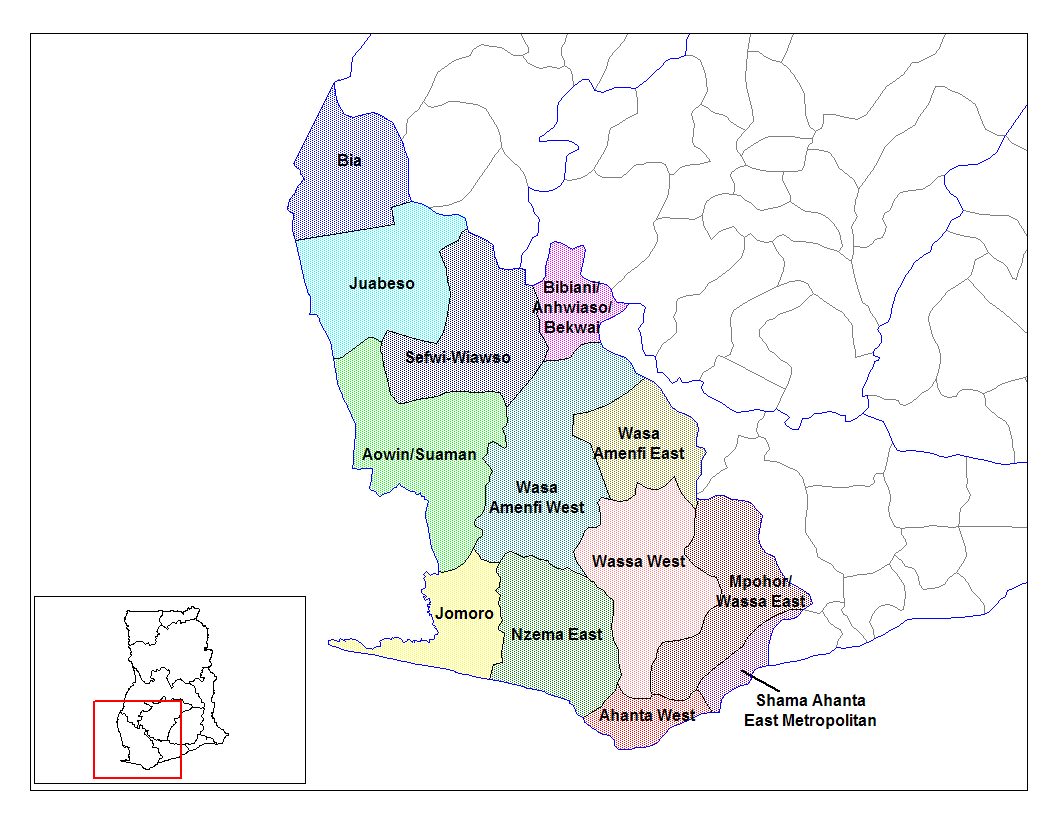
- Districts of Western Region

- Location of Wassa Amenfi District within Western
- Coordinates: 5°48′33.12″N 2°26′8.52″W
- Country: Ghana
- Region: Western
- Capital: Asankragua
- Time zone: UTC+0 (GMT)
- ISO 3166 code: GH-WP-WA

Wassa Amenfi District is a former district that was located in Western Region, Ghana. Originally created as an ordinary district assembly in 1988, which was created from the former Aowin-Amenfi District Council. However, in August 2004, it was split off into two new districts: Wassa Amenfi West District (which it was elevated to municipal district assembly status on 15 March 2018; capital: Asankragua) and Wassa Amenfi East District (which it was also elevated to municipal district assembly status on 15 March 2018; capital: Wassa-Akropong). The district assembly was located in the central part of Western Region and had Asankragua as its capital town.
