= John Frank Abu =

Ghanaian politician

Hon. John Frank Abu
- In office 7 January 1993 – 6 January 1997
- Succeeded by: George Kofi Arthur

MP for Amenfi Central
- In office 7 january 1997 – 6 January 2001
- President: John Agyekum Kufour
- In office 7 January 2001 – 6 january 2005

Personal details
- Born: Amenfi Central, Western Region
- Party: National Democratic Congress
- Education: University of Ghana
- Occupation: Politician
- Profession: Minister

John Frank Abu is a Ghanaian Politician and a member of the First, second and Third Parliament of the Fourth Republic of Ghana representing the Amenfi Central Constituency in the Western Region of Ghana. He is a former Minister for Mining and Energy and Minister for Trade and Industries. He was also the Western regional Minister in the erstwhile National Democratic Congress (NDC) government.

== Early life and education ==
Abu was born in Amenfi Central in the Western Region of Ghana. He attended the University of Guelph, Canada where he obtained his Doctor of Philosophy, PhD. He studied Agriculture at the University of Ghana where he gained his Master of Science and Bachelor of Science degrees.

== Politics ==
In 1997, He was appointed by Jerry John Rawlings as Minister of Mines and Energy. In 2007, He was elected as the NDC's regional chairman for the Western region beating his opponent Mr Seidu Adamu with 68 to 60 votes.

Abu was first elected into parliament as member of the first parliament of the fourth republic of Ghana in the 1992 Ghanaian parliamentary election on the ticket of the National Democratic Congress. He was in Parliament for the second time during the December 1996 Ghanaian General election. He polled 18,644 votes representing 67.7% out of 27,551 of the valid votes cast over his opponents Emmanuel O.K Duah who polled 8,136 votes representing 25.9% and Kofi Osei who polled 624 votes representing 2.3%, Lawrence K.Afari who polled 147 votes and Kwame Adjei-Amoahene who polled 0 vote.

=== 2000 Elections ===
Abu was elected as the member of parliament for the Amenfi Central constituency in the Western region of Ghana in the 2000 Ghanaian general elections. He therefore represented the constituency in the Third parliament of the Fourth republic of Ghana. He was elected with 13,319 votes out of 24,514 total valid votes cast. This is equivalent to 54.30% of the total valid votes cast. He was elected over Padmore Kofi Arthur of the New Patriotic Party, Osei Kofi of the Peoples National Convention Party and George K.Essem-Koffie of the Convention Peoples Party. These obtained 10,208, 527 and 460 votes respectively of the total valid votes cast, equivalent to 41.60%, 2.10% and 1.90% respectively of the total valid votes cast. The National Democratic Congress won a total of 9 seats out of 19 seats in the Western Region in that election. In all, the party won a minority total of 89 parliamentary representation out of 200 seats in the 3rd parliament of the 4th republic of Ghana.

In 2001, he condemned the Government of Ghana for not putting in place effective policies to advance the mining sector in the country. He claimed the sector was on the verge of collapse.

== Career ==
Abu is the Chairman of Tema Oil Refinery Limited. He is a former Minister of Mines and Energy. He worked as the Minister of Trade and Industries. He is also an Agriculturist.

== Personal life ==
Abu is a Christian.
