= William Kwabena Aduhene =

Ghanaian politician

Member of the Ghana Parliament for Wassaw-Akropong
- In office 1965–1966
- Preceded by: New
- Succeeded by: Constituency abolished

Member of the Ghana Parliament for Sefwi Wiawso
- In office 1956–1965
- Preceded by: New
- Succeeded by: Sebastian Kwaku Opon

Personal details
- Born: William Kwabena Aduhene; 8 August 1927 Aboduam, Sefwi-Wiawso District, Western Region, Gold Coast
- Party: Convention People's Party
- Education: St. Augustine's College
- Profession: Teacher

William Kwabena Aduhene was a Ghanaian teacher and politician. He was the member of parliament for the Sefwi Wiawso electoral district from 1956 to 1965. In 1965 he became the member of parliament representing the Wassaw-Akropong constituency. While in parliament, he held various appointments; he was the Ministerial Secretary to the Minister of State for Presidential Matters in Parliament, he was later appointed Deputy Minister for Defence and once served as the chairman of the State Diamond Mining Corporation. Prior to politics, Aduhene was a teacher at Sefwi Wiawso.

== Early life and education ==
Aduhene was born on 8 August 1927 at Aboduam in the Sefwi-Wiawso District, a district in the Western Region of the then Gold Coast. He had his early education at the Sefwi-Wiawso Government School from 1937 to 1944 where he obtained his Standard Seven School Leaving Certificate. He entered St. Augustine's College in 1946 to train as a teacher. He received his teachers' certificate "A" and qualified as a teacher in 1949.

== Career and politics ==
Aduhene begun work as a teacher at the Sefwi-Wiawso Local Council School at Dabunso in 1950. He gave up teaching in 1956 to venture politics. In 1956 he run for the Sefwi Wiawso seat on the ticket of the Convention People's Party and won. He remained in this post until 1965 when he became the member of parliament for the Wassaw-Akropong constituency. He remained in parliament until 1966 when the Nkrumah government was overthrown. While in parliament he held various appointments. He once served as the Ministerial Secretary to the Minister of State for Presidential Matters in Parliament and was later appointed as Deputy Minister for Defence. Prior to the 1966 coup d'état he was the chairman of the State Diamond Mining Corporation.

== Personal life ==
Aduhene married in 1951 however, the marriage was dissolved in 1952. In the marriage, he had one child. In 1959, he married Miss. Jane Ghartey.

== See also ==
- List of MLAs elected in the 1956 Gold Coast legislative election
- List of MPs elected in the 1965 Ghanaian parliamentary election
