= Enchi College of Education =

Teacher education college in Western North Region, Ghana

- Established: 1965
- Affiliations: University of Ghana, Government of Ghana
- Principal: Professor Francis Kwaw Andoh
- Dean: Dr Emmanuel Brew
- Location: Enchi, Aowin District District, WA00004, Ghana; 5.82944°N 2.82522°W
- Language: English
- Region Zone: Western; Central / Western
- Short name: Enchicoe
- Source: An Atlas of The Forty Colleges of Education in Ghana.

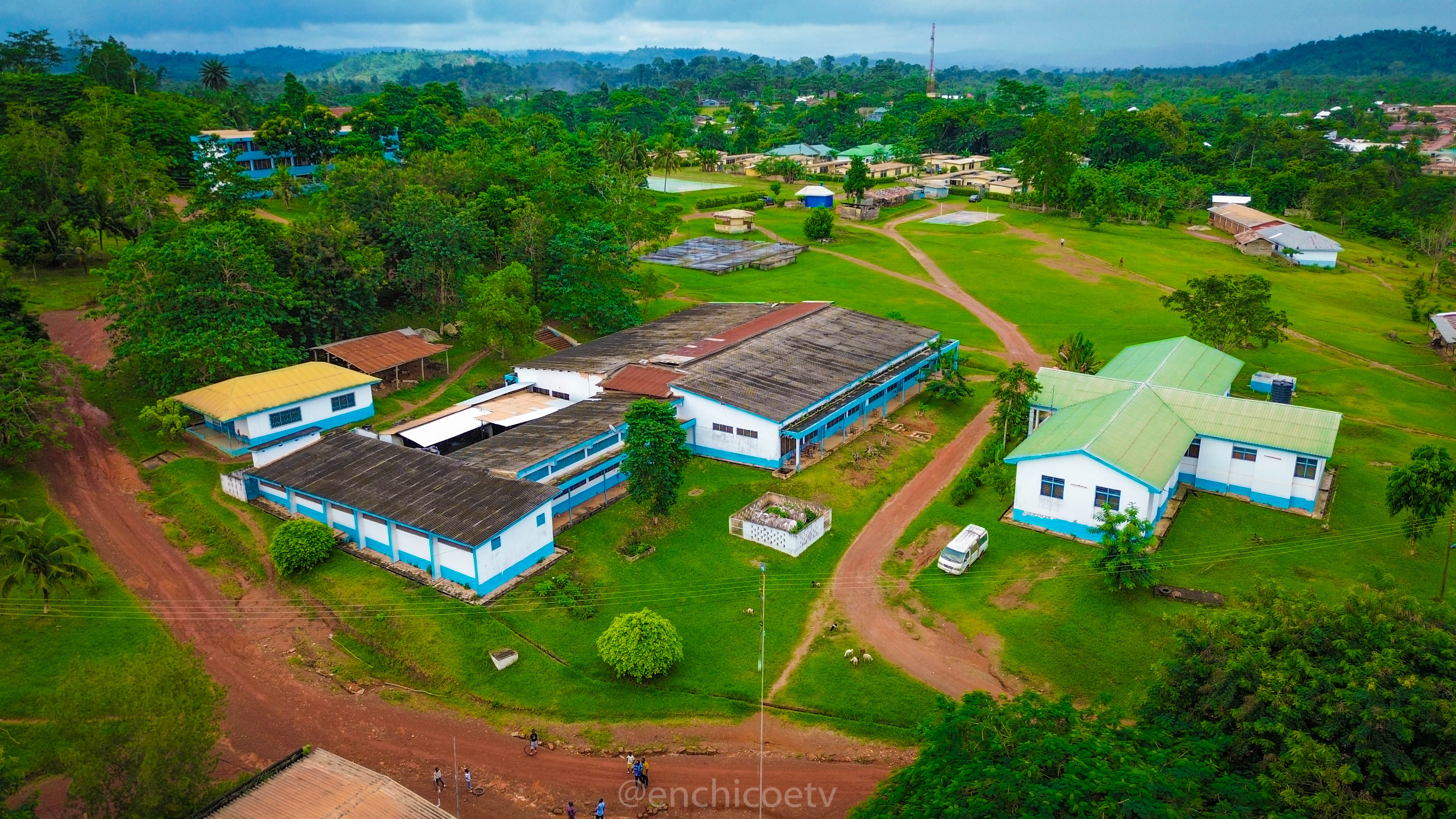
Campus View of Enchi College of Education

Enchi College of Education (ENCHICOE) is a teacher education college in Enchi, Western North Region, Ghana. It is one of the 49 public colleges of education in Ghana. The college participated in the DFID-funded T-TEL programme. Professor Francis Kwaw Andoh is the current Principal of the College since September 2025.

In May 2019, the College was affiliated to the University of Ghana.

== Programmes ==
Enchi College of Education offers the new Bachelor of Education programmes and they include the B.Ed Early Grade Education, B.Ed Upper Primary Education and B.Ed JHS Education (with specialisms in English, French, RME, Geography, History, Ghanaian Language). The College admitted 366 students for the 2025/2026 academic year

== Achievements ==
The College emerged as the Number One College for the Fidelity of Implementation of the Bachelor of Education Curriculum in 2023 among all 47 Colleges of Education in Ghana.

In 2024, the College emerged as the overall best College among all the Colleagues affiliated to the University of Ghana, Legon. Again, the Former Principal, Mr Philip Ntaah won the best principal among all UG affiliated Colleges of Education Principals in 2024

In 2025, the College emerged as a winner in the inter-college sports competition Organized at Our Lady of Apostles College of Education.

== History ==
Enchi College of Education was established in 1965 as a male institution and became co-educational a decade later with the admission of thirty-five women in the year 1975. It re-located to its present site in the year 1978. The College started with a 4-year post middle Teacher's Certificate ‘A’ programme. The college is located at the Aowin Municipality in the Western-North Region of the republic of Ghana. The College's original campus was sited at the southern end of the Enchi township, now being used as the Nana Brentu Secondary Technical School. The first principal of the College was Mr. Djeo Addisson. The college was converted into a three-year post-secondary teacher training college in 1988. The college's 61 years of existence so far has been marked by a number of achievements. With the initial enrolment of 70 students and 9 academic staff, the college now has a total enrolment of one thousand and seventy-eight teacher trainees. Also, the college has 199 staff, both teaching and non-teaching. In the 2002/2003 academic year, the University of Education, Winneba, chose the college as the Western Regional Centre for the Distance Education Programme to prepare certificate ‘A’ teachers for Diploma in Basic Education. In October 2019, the college started the Bachelor of Education Programmes. It is currently running distance programmes with the University of Cape Coast, University of Winneba, and Jackson College of Education alongside its regular programmes. The college has been able to produce over 8,814 teachers as at the 2022/2023 academic year, most of whom are currently occupying very enviable positions in the country.

== Key Management Officers of the College ==
Name	Position
Prof. Francis Andoh-kwaw	College Principal
Dr. Regine Kwaw	Vice Principal
Mr. Bright Appau	College Secretary
Mr. Ronald Andoh-Kwaw	Ag. College Librarian
Mr. John Nda Ackah Blay	Ag. Finance Officer
Mr. Vicent Takyi	Ag. Internal Auditor

List of principals:
Name	Years served
Mr. Djeo Addison	1965 – 1973
Mr. D.M. Korwumu	1974 – 1976
Mr. John Attipila	1976 – 1980
Mr. Assifuah Nunoo	1980 – 1983
Mr. A.B. Quansah	1983 – 2003
Ms. Victoria Aidoo	2007 – 2016
Mr. Philip Ntaah	2018 - 2025
Prof. Francis Andoh-Kwaw	2025 Present

== Notable Alumni ==
1. Prof. Francis Kwaw Andoh - An Associate Professor of Economics at the University of Cape Coast who graduated from Enchi College of Education’s 1997 year group and later returned as the college principal.
2. Hon Paul Evans Aidoo - is one of the notable alumnus who completed in the 1980 and former Western Regional Minister.
3. Hon Victor Samuel Meisu - An alumnus from the 1986 year batch and a former District Chief Executive of Wassa Amenfi West
4. Isaac Mensah Monnie - From the 1986 year group and a former College Secretary of Enchi College of Education
5. Dr. Emmanuel Adom Eshun
