= Manso Amenfi =

Town in Western Region, Ghana

Manso Amenfi Manso-Amenfi
- Town
- Location of Manso Amenfi in Western Region, Ghana Manso Amenfi (Africa)
- Coordinates: 5.64°N 2.26°W
- Country: Ghana
- Region: Western Region
- Time zone: GMT
  - Summer (DST): GMT

Manso Amenfi is a town and district capital of the Amenfi Central District in the Western Region of Ghana. As at 2018, the Assemblyman of the town was Alex Emmanuel Nti. As at 2018, the Chief of the town was Alhaji Sulemana Bukari.

== Facilities ==
There is a Cyber laboratory (Cyberlab) in the town. The town also has an Islamic school. The town also has Manso Amenfi SHS.

== Notable native ==
- Peter Yaw Kwakye-Ackah, Ghanaian politician
