= Joana Gyan Cudjoe =

Ghanaian politician and businesswoman

Joana Gyan Cudjoe is a Ghanaian politician, businesswoman, women's right advocate and a member of parliament representing the Amenfi Central Constituency in the Western Region of Ghana. She is said to be the only female gold exporter in Ghana.

== Early life ==
Cudjoe was born on 7 May 1984 and hails from Wassa Agona Amenfi in the Western Region of Ghana. She attended IPMC University College and graduated with a Diploma in Computer Science with Management in 2024. She also had her Diploma in Criminal Investigations and Intelligence Analysis from the Doyen Institute of Intelligence and Investigation.

== Career ==
Cudjoe is a businesswoman and was the President at Golden Empire Legacy Limited.

== Political career ==
Cudjoe is a member of the National Democratic Congress.

2024 elections

In October 2024, the Electoral Commission disqualified Cudjoe because of a court case against her.

Five people accused Cudjoe of forging her voter ID and her party card and they sued her. Later in November 2024, the Sekondi High Court allowed her to contest in the 2024 Ghanaian general election.

In the 2024 Ghanaian general election, she defeated the NPP candidate, Dr Albert Wiredu Arkoh. She secured 26,345 votes whilst Arkoh had 12,096.

== Personal life ==
Cudjoe is married to a member of Keche known as Keche Andrew.
