= Wassa Amenfi West Municipal District =

District in Western region, Ghana

- Municipal District
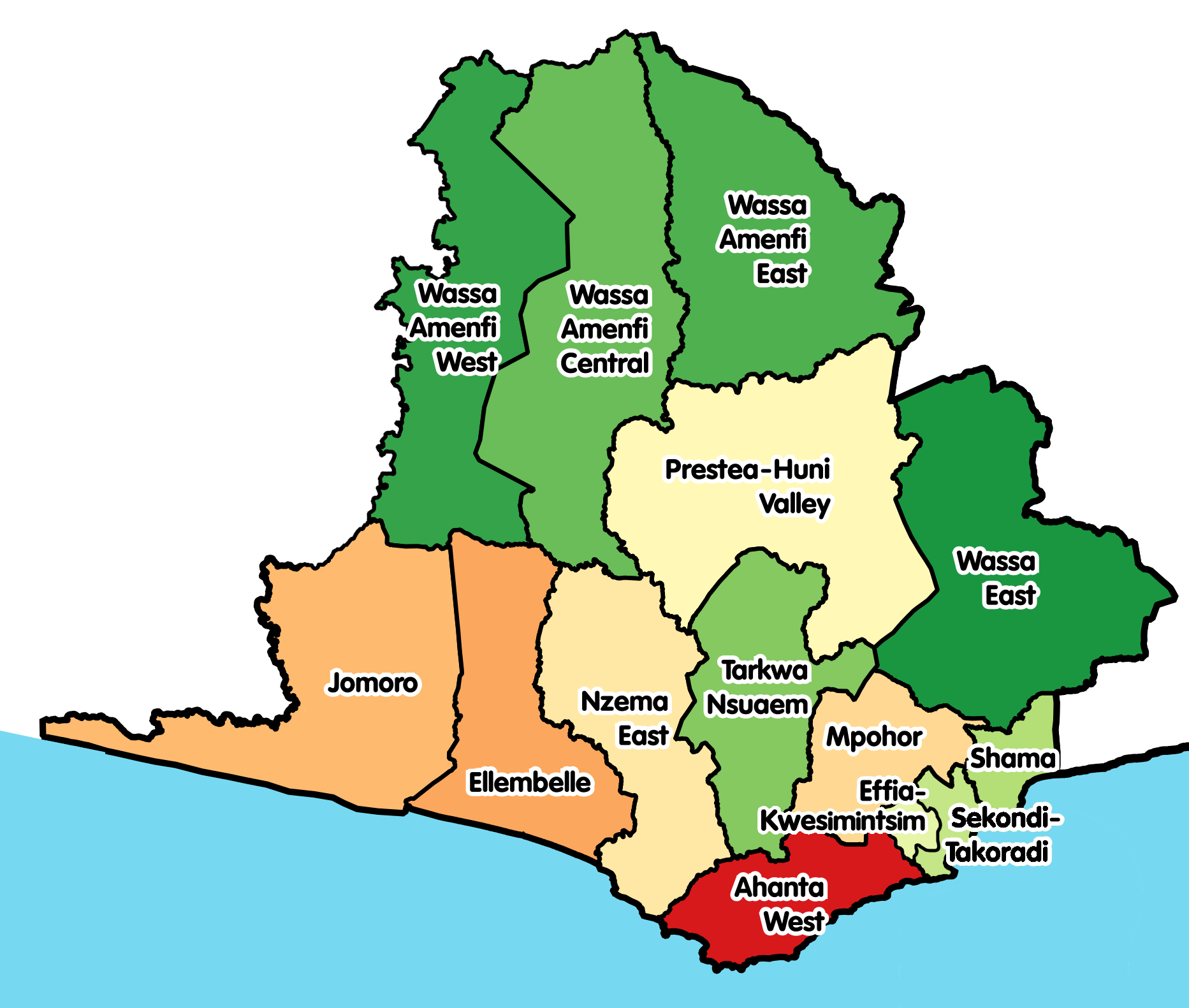
- Districts of Western Region

- Location of Wassa Amenfi West Municipal District within Western
- Coordinates: 5°48′33.12″N 2°26′8.52″W
- Country: Ghana
- Region: Western
- Capital: Asankragua

Government
  - Municipal Chief Executive: Hon. George Agyiri

Area
  - Total: 1,489 km^{2} (575 sq mi)

Population (2021)
  - Total: 129,882
  - Density: 87.23/km^{2} (225.9/sq mi)
- Time zone: UTC+0 (GMT)
- ISO 3166 code: GH-WP-WW

Wassa Amenfi West Municipal District is one of the fourteen districts in Western Region, Ghana. Originally it was formerly part of the then-larger Wassa Amenfi District in 1988, which was created from the former Aowin-Amenfi District Council, until eastern part of the district was split off to create Wassa Amenfi East District in August 2004; thus the remaining part has been renamed as Wassa Amenfi West District. Later, another part of the district was split off to create Wassa Amenfi Central District on 28 June 2012; thus the remaining part has been retained as Wassa Amenfi West District. However, on 15 March 2018, it was later elevated to municipal district assembly status to become Wassa Amenfi West Municipal District. The municipality is located in the northern part of Western Region and has Asankragua as its capital town.

== Sources ==
- "Districts of Ghana". Statoids.
- GhanaDistricts.com
