= John Kweku Danso =

Ghanaian politician

John Kwaku Danso

MP for Sefwi-Wiawso
- In office 7 January 1993 – 6 January 1997
- President: Jerry John Rawlings

Personal details
- Born: 27 September 1944 (age 82) Sefwi-Wiawso, Western Region Gold Coast (now Ghana)
- Party: National Democratic Congress
- Education: University of Cape Coast
- Occupation: Politician
- Profession: Teacher

John Kweku Danso (born 27 September 1944) is a Ghanaian politician and a member of the first Parliament of the fourth Republic representing the Sefwi-Wiawso constituency in the Western Region of Ghana. He represented the National Democratic Congress.

== Early life and education ==
John Kweku Danso was born on 27 September 1957 at Sefwi-Wiawso in the Western Region of Ghana. He attended the University of Cape Coast and obtained his Bachelor of Art.

== Politics ==
John Kweku Danso was first elected into Parliament on the ticket of the National Democratic Congress for the Sefwi-Wiawso constituency in the Western Region of Ghana during the 1992 Ghanaian General Elections. He was defeated by Isaac Kobina Nyame-Ofori in the 1996 Parliamentary primaries. He won in the general elections with 43,738 votes out of the 100% valid votes cast representing 61.90% over Kwasi Blay of the New Patriotic Party who polled 12,625 votes representing 17.90%.

== Career ==
Prior to being a former member of parliament for the Sefwi-Wiawso constituency in the Western Region of Ghana, he also is a teacher by profession.

== Personal life ==
Kweku is a Christian by faith.
