= Amenfi Central District =

- District
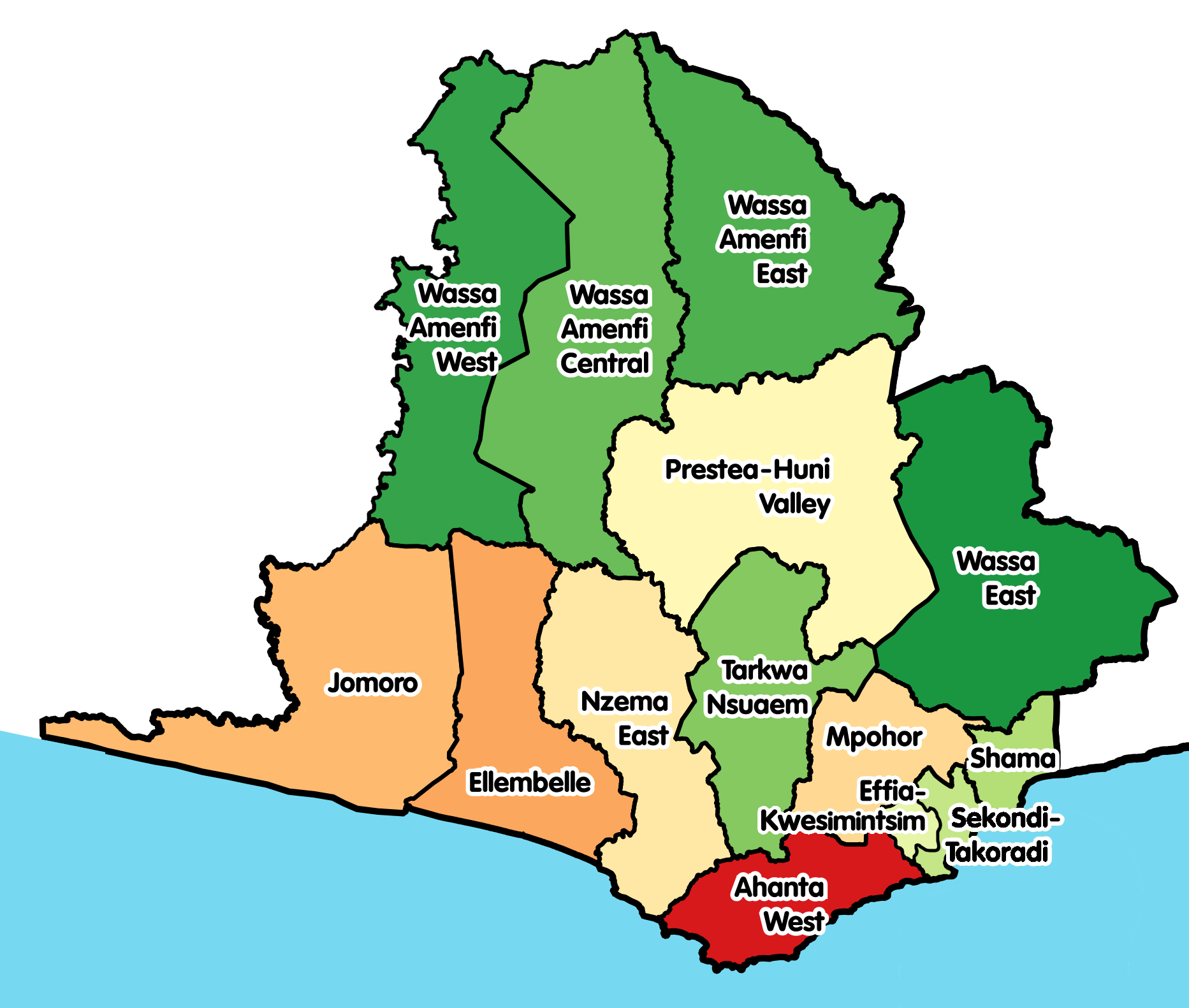
- Districts of Western Region

- Location of Amenfi Central District within Western
- Coordinates: 5°37′59.52″N 2°15′4.32″W
- Country: Ghana
- Region: Western
- Capital: Manson Amenfi

Area
  - Total: 1,643 km^{2} (634 sq mi)

Population (2021 census)
  - Total: 119,117
  - Density: 72.50/km^{2} (187.8/sq mi)
- Time zone: UTC+0 (GMT)
- ISO 3166 code: GH-WP-WC

Amenfi Central District is one of the fourteen districts in Western Region, Ghana. Originally it was formerly part of the then-larger Wassa Amenfi West District in August 2004, which was created from the former Aowin-Amenfi District Council, until the eastern part of the district was split off to create Amenfi Central District on 28 June 2012; thus the remaining part has been renamed as Wassa Amenfi West District (which it was later elevated to municipal district assembly status on 15 March 2018 to become Wassa Amenfi West Municipal District). The district assembly is located in the northern part of Western Region and has Manso Amenfi as its capital town.
