= Stephen Michael Essuah Kofi Ackah =

Ghanaian politician

Member of the Ghana Parliament for Suaman Constituency
- In office 7 January 2005 – 6 January 2021
- Preceded by: Constituency split
- Succeeded by: Joseph Betino

Personal details
- Born: 22 September 1950 (age 76)
- Party: National Democratic Congress
- Education: Wesley College, Kumasi; University of Education, Winneba; Ghana Institute of Management and Public Administration

Stephen Michael Essuah Kofi Ackah is a Ghanaian politician and member of the Seventh Parliament of the Fourth Republic of Ghana representing the Suaman Constituency in the Western Region on the ticket of the National Democratic Congress.

== Early life and education ==
Ackah hails from Suaman-Dadieso in the Western region. He had his post secondary teacher training at Wesley College, Kumasi and proceeded to the Specialist Training College (STC), Winneba where he obtained his diploma. He earned his Bachelor of Education (BEd) in Physical Education from the University of Education, Winneba in 2000, and had his Executive Masters in Governance and Leadership (EMGL) Ghana Institute of Management and Public Administration (GIMPA) in 2000.

== Career ==
He worked at the Ghana Education Service GES) as an assistant director and as a tutor at Ejisuman Senior High School.

== Politics ==
Ackah entered parliament on 7 January 2005 representing the Suaman constituency on the ticket of the National Democratic Party. He has remained in parliament for four consecutive parliamentary terms.

In parliament, he has served on various committees, including the Subsidiary Legislation Committee, the Local Government and Rural Development Committee, the Youth, Sports and Culture Committee, and the Special Budget Committee.

=== 2012 election ===
Ackah contested the Suaman (Ghana parliament constituency) parliamentary seat on the ticket of National Democratic Congress during the 2012 Ghanaian general election and won with 9,588 votes, representing 63.02% of the total votes. He won the parliamentary seat over Philip Kwabena Boahen of the New Patriotic Party who pulled 5,454 votes which is equivalent to 35.85% and the parliamentary candidate for the Progressive People's Party Andrews Boafo had 172 votes representing 1.13% of the total votes.

=== 2016 election ===
Ackah was re-elected as a member of parliament for Suaman constituency in the Western Region on the ticket of National Democratic Congress during the 2016 Ghanaian general election with 6,185 votes representing 47.95% of the total votes. He was elected over Christian Baah of the New Patriotic Party who pulled 6,173 votes which is equivalent to 47.86%, parliamentary candidate for the Progressive People's Party Andrews Boafo had 466 votes representing 3.61% and the parliamentary candidate for the Convention People's Party Kingsford Quaicoe had 74 votes representing 0.57% of the total votes.

== Personal life ==
Ackah is married with three children. He is a Christian who fellowships at Methodist.
