= Joseph Betino =

Ghana Politician

Hon. Joseph Betino MP
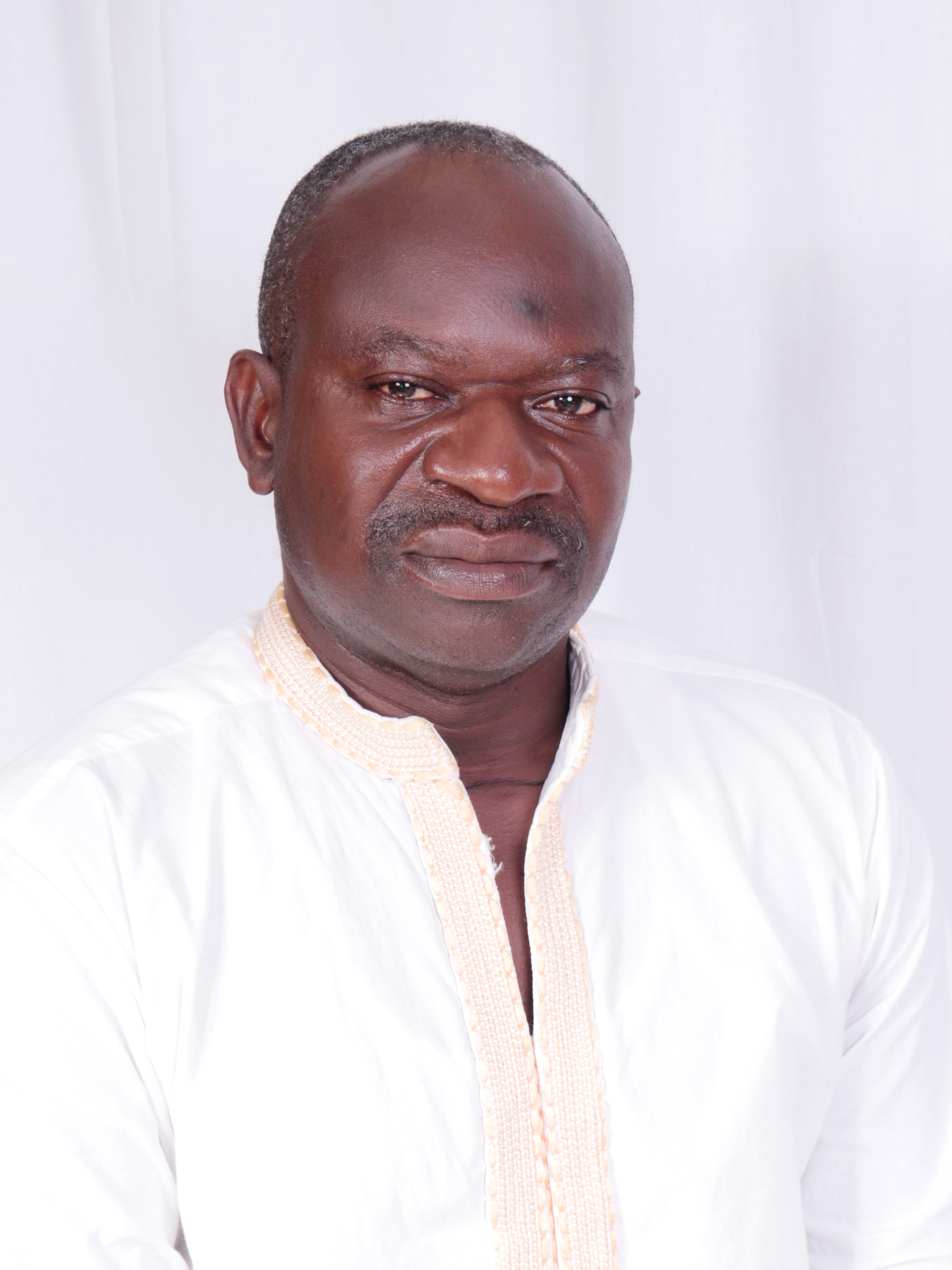

Member of the Ghana Parliament for Suaman Constituency
- Preceded by: Stephen Michael Essuah Kofi Ackah

Personal details
- Born: 27 August 1966 (age 59)
- Party: National Democratic Congress(NDC)

Joseph Betino (born 27 August 1966) is a Ghanaian politician and a member Eighth Parliament of the Fourth Republic of Ghana representing Suaman Constituency in the Western North Region. He became a member of parliament on the ticket of the National Democratic Congress.

== Early life and education ==
He comes from Nandom and was born on the 27th of August 1966. In 1990, Betino had his A level education.

== Politics ==
Betino was formerly the District Chief Executive for the Suaman Constituency. He contested and won the NDC Parliamentary Primaries at Suaman Constituency to become the party's candidate for the December 2020 election. He pulled 8900 votes representing 51.2% of the total vote to win.

=== Committees ===
He serves as a member of the standing Order Committee of parliament and the Food, Agriculture and Cocoa affairs Committee.

== Personal life ==
He is a Christian.
