= Frederick Addy =

Politician from Ghana

Frederick Addy is a politician and a member of Parliament for Suaman, Ghana. He was appointed by Nana Akufo-Addo as the new Deputy Chief Executive Officer in Charge of Finance and Investment. Addy was appointed NHIA's new deputy CEO of finance and investment.

== Education ==
Addy holds a Diploma in Basic Education at Jackson College (WINNEBA). He also holds a Master of Science Degree from Kwame Nkrumah University of Science and Technology. Frederick Addy completed Dadieso Senior High School in June 2007 and in 2020 he completed Ghana Baptist University where he attains Bachelor of Science.

== Political Career ==
His political journey started when he contested for Member of Parliament at Suaman Constituency best lost against Hon Betino in the year 2020. The President of the Republic of Ghana, His Excellency Nana Addo Dankwa Akufo-Addo, has appointed Mr. Frederick Gilbert Addy as the new Deputy Chief Executive Officer in charge of Finance and Investment.
