= Arthur Sibieko Bullu =

Ghanaian politician

MP for Aowin-Suaman
- In office 7 January 1993 – 6 January 1997
- President: Jerry John Rawlings

Personal details
- Born: 20 June 1937 (age 89) Aowin-Suaman, Western Region, Gold Coast (now Ghana)
- Party: National Democratic Congress
- Education: University of Pedagogy
- Occupation: Politician
- Profession: University lecturer

Arthur Sibieko Bullu (born 20 June 1937) is a Ghanaian politician and a member of the first Parliament of the fourth Republic representing the Aowin-Suaman Constituency in the Western Region of Ghana. He represented the National Democratic Congress.

== Early life and education ==
Arthur Sibieko Bullu was born in Aowin-Suaman, Ghana on 20 June 1937. He attended the Minsk University (USSR) where he obtained his Masters of Science in engineering. Subsequently, he attended the Power Engineering Institute, Russia, and was awarded the Diploma in Education. He continued at the University of Pedagogy and was awarded a Doctor of Philosophy in Engineering and the Marxist University awarded him a Doctor of philosophy in Political Science.

== Politics ==
Bullu was first elected into Parliament on the ticket of the National Democratic Congress for the Aowin-Suaman constituency in the Western Region of Ghana during the 1992 Ghanaian general elections. However, he wasn't re-elected as he lost to John Kwakucher Ackah in 1996. During the 1996 general elections, Ackah polled 29,092 votes out of the 100% valid votes cast representing 45.20% over his opponents Kingsley Ofori Asante of the New Patriotic Party who polled 9,580 votes representing 4.70%, S.B.Ing Arthur of the National Convention Party who polled 3002 votes representing 14.90% and Frank Ernest Prah who polled 1,532 votes representing 2.40%.

== Career ==
Bullu is a university lecturer and a former member of Parliament for the Aowin-Suaman constituency where he served a single term from 1993 to 1997.

== Personal life ==
He is a Christian.
