= Isaac Kobina Nyame-Ofori =

Ghanaian politician

Hon Isaac Kobina Nyame Ofori

Member of parliament for Sefwi-Wiawso Constituency
- In office 7 January 1997 – 6 January 2005
- President: John Jerry Rawlings
- Preceded by: John Kwaku Danso

Personal details
- Born: Sefwi-Wiawso, Western Region, Ghana
- Party: National Democratic Congress
- Occupation: Politician
- Profession: Farmer

Isaac Kobina Nyame-Ofori is a Ghanaian politician, farmer and a member of the 3rd parliament of the 4th republic of Ghana. He is a former member of Parliament for the Sefwi-Wiawso constituency in the Western Region a member of the National Democratic Congress political party in Ghana.

== Politics ==
Nyame-Ofori was a member of the 3rd parliament of the 4th republic of Ghana. He is a member of the National Democratic Congress and a representative of the Sefwi-Wiawso constituency of the Western Region of Ghana. His political career began when he contested in the 2000 Ghanaian General elections and won on the ticket of the National Democratic Congress.

=== 2000 Elections ===
Nyame-Ofori was elected as the member of parliament for the Sefwi-Wiawso constituency in the 2000 Ghanaian general elections. He won the elections on the ticket of the National Democratic Congress. His constituency was a part of the 9 parliamentary seats out of 19 seats won by the National Democratic Congress in that election for the Western Region succeeding John Kwaku Danso.

The National Democratic Congress won a minority total of 92 parliamentary seats out of 200 seats in the 3rd parliament of the 4th republic of Ghana. He was elected with 32,753 votes out of 52,883 total valid votes cast. This was equivalent to63.9% of the total valid votes cast. He was elected over Kwasi Blay of the New Patriotic Party and Francis Kwabena Bih of the Convention People's Party. These obtained 18,537 and 0 votes respectively out of the total valid votes cast. These were equivalent to 36.1% and 0% respectively of total valid votes cast.

== See also ==
- List of MPs elected in the 2000 Ghanaian parliamentary election
