= Dadieso =

Community in Oti Region, Ghana

- Location in Ghana
- Country: Ghana
- Region: Western North Region
- District: Suaman District

Dadieso is a community and the district capital of the Suaman District in the Western North Region of Ghana. It is the location of the Dadieso Forest Reserve.

== Institution ==
- Dadieso Senior High School

== Notable native ==
- DJ Switch (Ghanaian DJ)
