= Kofi Benteh Afful =

Ghanaian politician

Kofi Benteh Afful is a Ghanaian politician. He is a Member of Parliament in Ghana for Sefwi Wiawso. He is a member of the National Democratic Congress (NDC).

== Early life and education ==
Benteh hails from Sefwi Boako and was born on 24 February,1980. He earned his Basic Education Certificate in 1996 from Reutzel Memorial Junior Secondary School. He also earned the Senior Secondary School Certificate (SSSC). He graduated from the University of Cape Coast with a bachelor's degree in commerce.
