= Sefwi-Wiawso Municipal District =

- Municipal District
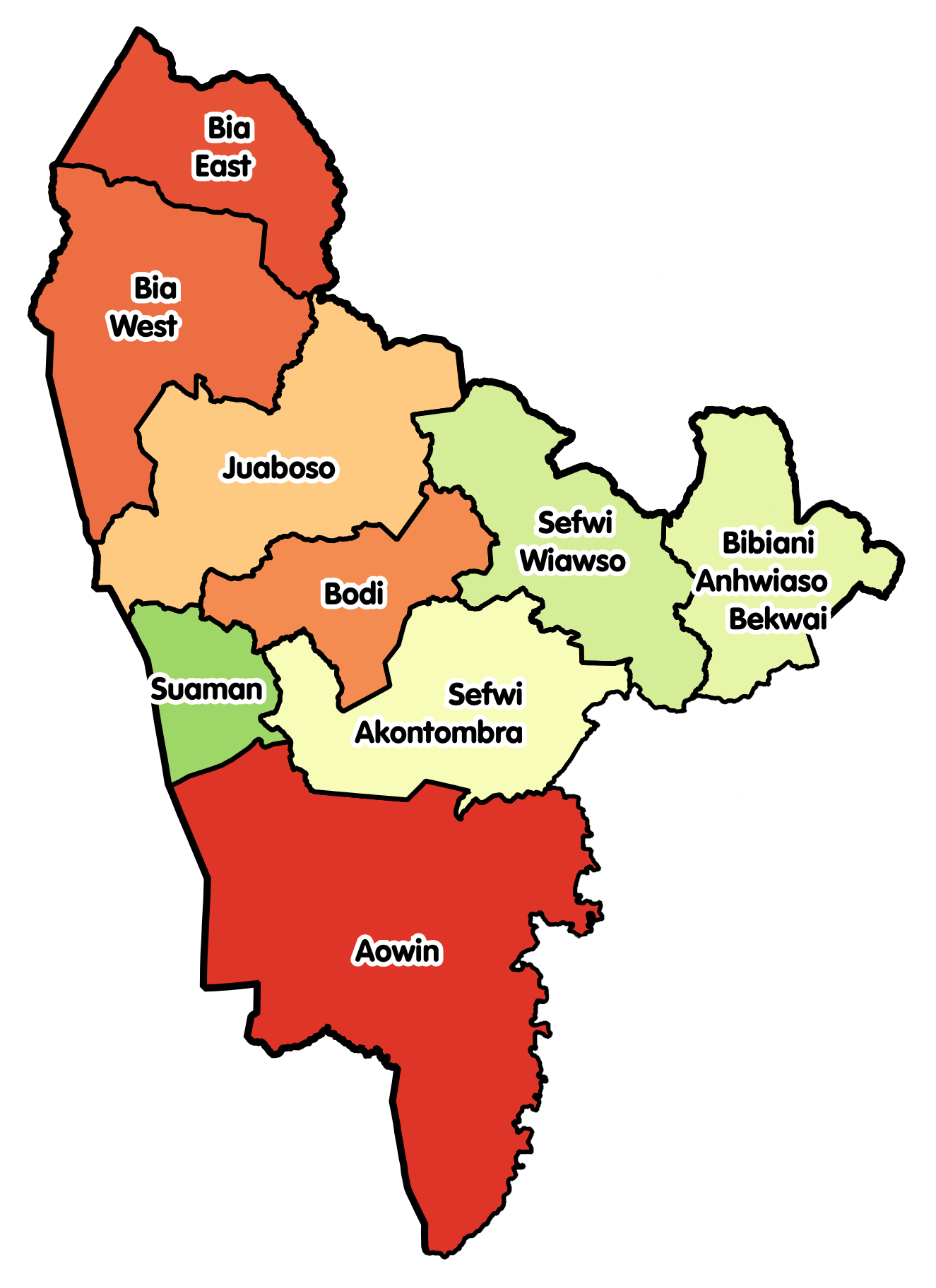
- Districts of Western North Region

- Location of Sefwi-Wiawso Municipal District within Western North
- Coordinates: 6°12′57″N 2°29′6″W
- Country: Ghana
- Region: Western North
- Capital: Wiawso

Government
  - Municipal Chief Executive: Appiah Kubi Baidoo

Area
  - Total: 992 km^{2} (383 sq mi)

Population (2021 census)
  - Total: 151,220
  - Density: 152/km^{2} (395/sq mi)
- Time zone: UTC+0 (GMT)
- ISO 3166 code: GH-WN-SW

Sefwi-Wiawso Municipal District is one of the nine districts in Western North Region, Ghana. Originally created as an ordinary district assembly in 1988 when it was known as Sefwi-Wiawso District, until the southwest part of the district was split off to create Sefwi-Akontombra District on 29 February 2008; thus the remaining part has been retained as Sefwi-Wiawso District, which it was later elevated to municipal district assembly status in March 2012 (effectively 28 June 2012) to become Sefwi-Wiawso Municipal District. The municipality is located in the northeast part of Western North Region and has Wiawso as its capital town.

== See also ==
- Sefwi-Wiawso (Ghana parliament constituency)

== Sources ==
- "Districts of Ghana". Statoids.
- GhanaDistricts.com
