= Enchi =

- Location in Ghana
- Coordinates: 5°49′N 2°49′W
- Country: Ghana
- Region: Western North Region
- District: Aowin District

Enchi is a town located in the Western North Region of Ghana. It is the capital of the Aowin Municipality. Other major towns in the municipality includes: Old and New Yakasi, Achimfo, Boinso, Jema, Omanpe, Sewum, Jensue, Yiwabra, Yiwabra Nkwanta, Nyankomam, Kwawu, Abochia, and Jomoro. The largest water body in the Municipality is the Tano river whose tributary, the Desue (Disue), flows through the township of Enchi.

The current leaders include the Paramount chief, Nana Beyeeman Tano Kwaw Benbuin III. The incumbent Municipal Chief Executive is Samuel Adu Gyamfi, while the member of Parliament is Honorable Oscar Ofori Larbi.

== Religions ==
The area includes Christian, Muslim and traditional religions. Christian denominations include Catholic, Methodist, Presbyterian, Anglican, Seventh Day Adventist, Church of Pentecost, Assemblies of God, New Covenant Family Church (West Africa), Higher Grounds Chapel, Apostolic Church of Ghana and The Makarios Church.

== Notable natives ==
Several natives recently named as exemplary for the youth to emulate include:

- John Kwekucher Ackah, Former Member of Parliament, Richard Cudjoe and
- Ackah Essuman of the University of Cape Coast,
- Joseph Quainoo, first to be consecrated to the episcopate,
- Susana Esi Quainoo, Assistant Director I (G.E.S);
- Cobbinah, Rtd., Commissioner of Police;
- Mercy Nuamah,
- Victoria Aidoo-Afo, Former Principal of Enchi College of Education;
- Alex Quainoo, Assistant Commissioner of Police A I/C Budget,
- S. B. Arthur
- Ben Angyewa Essuman (Esq)
- Prof. Francis Kwaw Andoh

== Education ==
The town has several basic schools notable among them are: Enchico Demonstration/Experimental School, Roman Catholic Basic School, Commey Memorial School, Anglican Basic School, SDA Basic School, Methodist Basic School and the Presbyterian Basic School . The town has a Senior High School named Nana Brentu Senior High/Tech School and can boast of a College of Education(Teacher Training) named Enchi College of Education.

== Health ==
The town has two main health centres, namely the Enchi Government Hospital and the Presbyterian Health Center .

== Economy ==
Cocoa bean farming is a large contributor to the local economy.
