= Amenfi Central (Ghana parliament constituency) =

Ghanaian constituency

- constituency for the Parliament of Ghana
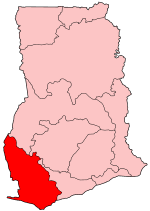
- District: Ahanta West District
- Region: Western Region of Ghana

Current constituency
- Party: National Democratic Congress
- MP: Joana Gyan Cudjoe

Amenfi Central is one of the constituencies represented in the Parliament of Ghana. It elects one Member of Parliament (MP) by the first past the post system of election. Joana Gyan Cudjoe is the member of parliament for the constituency. She was elected on the ticket of the National Democratic Congress (NDC).

== See also ==
- List of Ghana Parliament constituencies
