= Wassa-Akropong =

- Municipal
- Location in Ghana
- Coordinates: 05°47′14″N 02°05′01″W
- Country: Ghana
- Region: Western Region
- District: Wassa Amenfi East municipal
- Elevation: 45 m (148 ft)
- Time zone: GMT
  - Summer (DST): GMT

Wassa Akropong is a capital city of Wassa Amenfi East Municipal District in the Western Region of Ghana.
