= Asankragua =

Asankragua Asankrangwa
- District Capital
- Motto: add Kingstown Crescent a new suburb of Asankrangwa off Moseaso road
- Location in Ghana
- Coordinates: 5°48′0″N 2°26′20″W
- Country: Ghana
- Region: Western Region
- District: Wasa Amenfi West District
- Elevation: 331 ft (101 m)

Asankrangwa is the capital of Amenfi West Municipal, a district in the Western Region of Ghana.
