= Aowin-Amenfi District =

Aowin-Amenfi District Council
- Former District Council
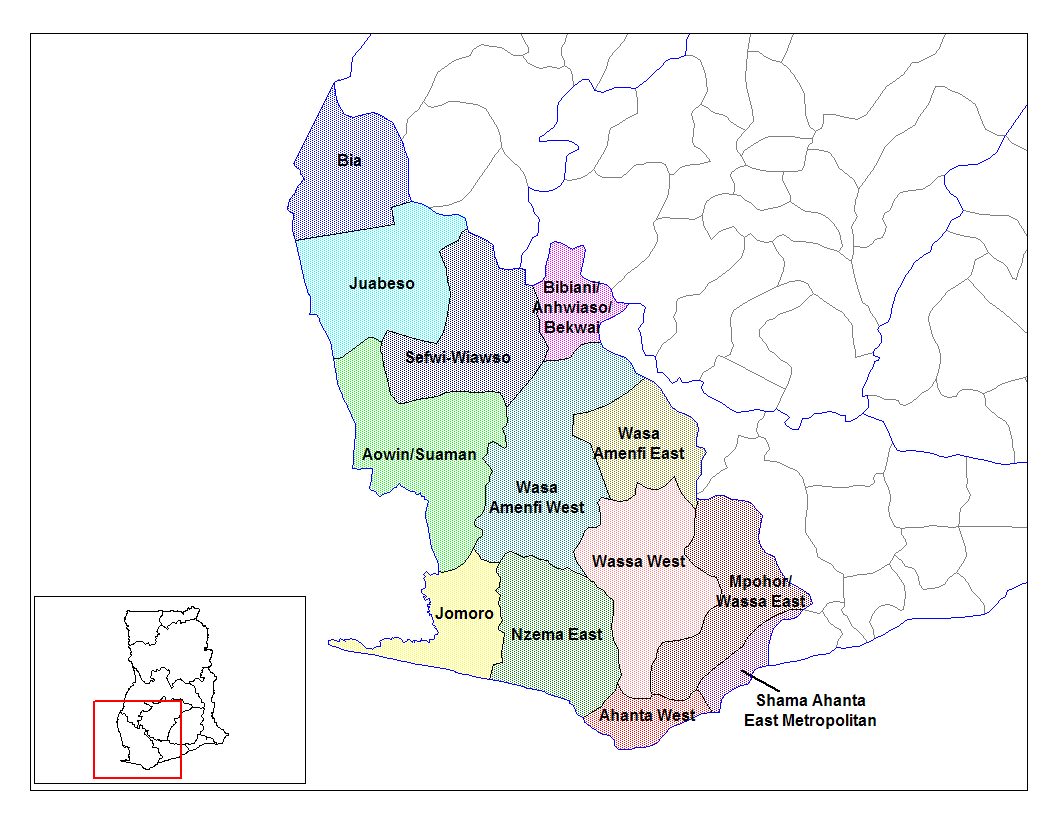
- Districts of Western Region

- Location of Aowin-Amenfi District Council within Western
- Coordinates: 5°48′33.12″N 2°26′8.52″W
- Country: Ghana
- Region: Western
- Capital: Asankragua
- Time zone: UTC+0 (GMT)
- ISO 3166 code: GH-WP-AA

Aowin-Amenfi District is a former district council that was located in Western Region, Ghana. It was originally created as a district council in 1975, but in 1988, it was split off into two new district assemblies: Wassa Amenfi District (capital: Asankragua) and Aowin/Suaman District (capital: Enchi). The district council was located in the northern part of the Western Region and had Asankragua as its capital town.
