= List of cities in Ghana =

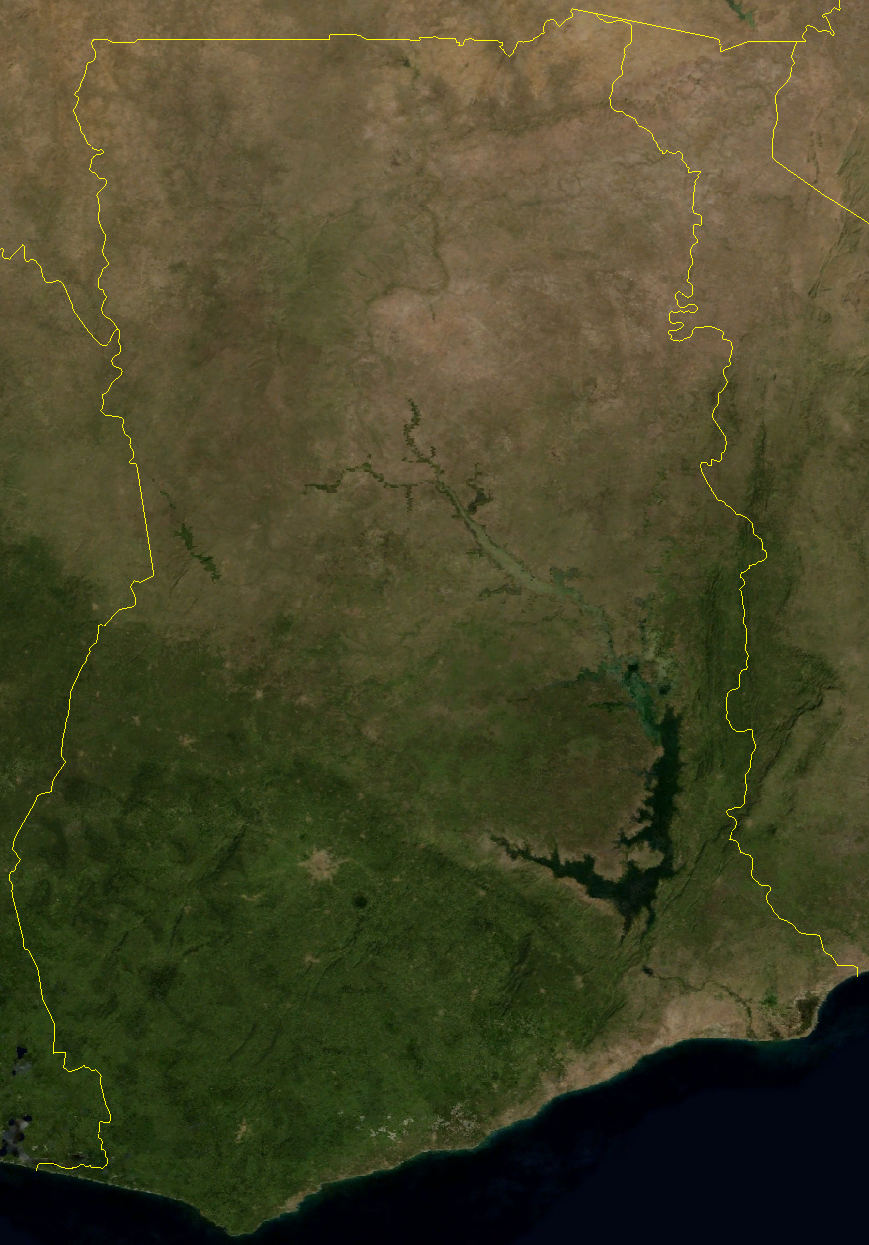
Satellite map of Ghana

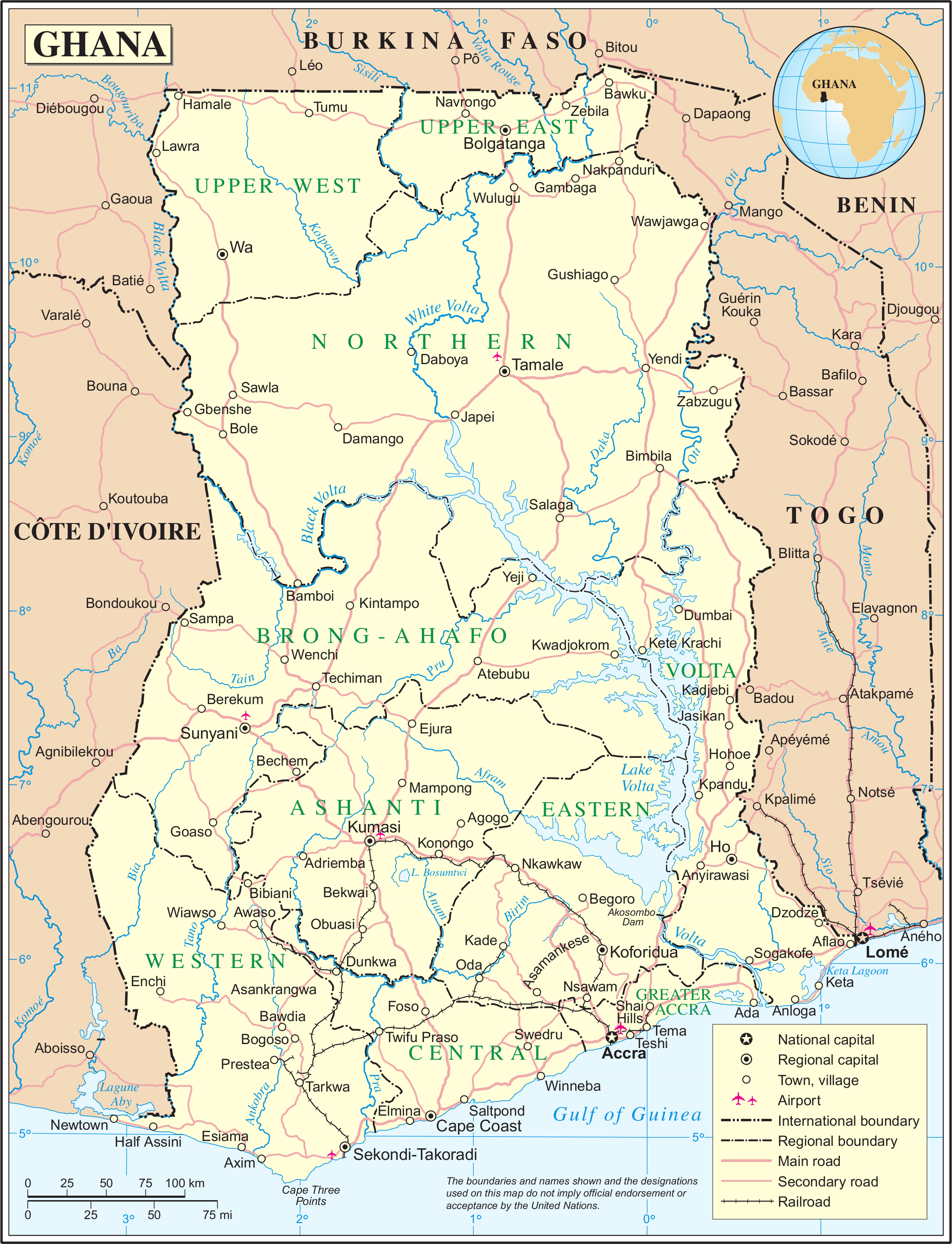
Detailed map of Ghana

This is a list of the cities and towns (i.e. human settlements) in the Republic of Ghana.

== List of cities in Ghana by population ==
Regional capital	Capital city

	Settlement	1970 census	1984 census	2000 census	2007 estimate	2013 estimate	2021 census	Location	Region
1.	Accra	564,194	867,459	1,659,136	2,096,653	2,291,352	2,864,779	5°33′N 0°12′W	Greater Accra
2.	Kumasi	260,286	489,586	1,171,311	1,604,909	2,069,350	2,495,580	06°42′00″N 01°37′30″W	Ashanti
3.	Tamale	83,653	135,952	202,317	222,730	562,919	749,488	09°24′27″N 00°51′12″W	Northern
4.	Sekondi-Takoradi	143,982	188,203	260,651	289,595	539,548	245,382	04°55′N 01°46′W	Western
5.	Ashaiman	22,549	50,918	150,312	228,509	298,841	208,060	5°42′N 0°02′W	Greater Accra
6.	Sunyani	28,780	40,634	61,992	210,748	248,496	329,597	07°20′N 02°20′W	Brong-Ahafo
7.	Cape Coast	51,653	57,224	118,105	154,204	227,269	306,034	05°06′N 01°15′W	Central
8.	Obuasi	31,005	60,617	115,564	147,614	180,334	196,698	06°12′N 01°41′W	Ashanti
9.	Teshie	39,382	59,552	92,359	154,513	176,597	143,012	5°35′N 0°06′W	Greater Accra
10.	Tema	60,767	100,052	141,479	161,106	161,612	177,924	05°40′N 00°00′W	Greater Accra
11.	Madina	7,480	28,364	76,697	112,888	143,356	244,676	05°41′00″N 00°10′00″W	Greater Accra
12.	Koforidua	46,235	58,731	87,315	99,890	130,810		6°06′N 0°16′W	Eastern
13.	Wa	13,740	36,067	66,644	83,091	105,821	200,672	10°4′N 2°30′W	Upper West
14.	Techiman	12,068	25,264	56,187	75,932	104,212	243,335	7°35′00″N 1°56′10″W	Brong-Ahafo
15.	Ho	24,199	37,777	61,658	73,498	99,375	180,420	6°36′43″N 0°28′13″E	Volta
16.	Nungua	13,839	29,146	62,902	75,622	86,431		5°36′0″N 0°4′0″W	Greater Accra
17.	Lashibi	N/A	507	30,193	54,789	86,188		5°41′4″N 0°2′17″W	Greater Accra
18.	Dome	772	1,954	29,618	56,655	84,904		5.655°N 0.235°W	Greater Accra
19.	Tema New Town	13,176	31,466	58,786	74,874	83,267		5°39′17.0″N 0°01′32.9″E	Greater Accra
20.	Gbawe	608	837	28,989	52,910	80,991		5°34′36″N 0°18′39″W	Greater Accra
21.	Kasoa	863	2,597	34,719	48,228	80,820		05°31′12″N 00°28′48″W	Central
22.	Ejura	10,664	18,775	29,478	49,954	75,390		7°23′N 1°22′W	Ashanti
23.	Taifa	N/A	1,009	26,145	48,927	74,264		5°39′58″N 0°15′8″W	Greater Accra
24.	Bawku	20,567	34,074	51,379	59,055	71,074		11°03′N 0°14′W	Upper East
25.	Aflao	1,397	20,904	38,927	48,876	69,284		06°08′48.4″N 01°10′47.6″E	Volta
26.	Agona Swedru	21,522	31,226	45,614	52,161	68,216		5°31′50″N 0°42′10″W	Central
27.	Bolgatanga	18,896	32,495	49,162	56,583	68,183	139,864	10°47′00″N 00°51′00″W	Upper East
28.	Tafo	N/A	25,688	N/A	53,165	62,382		6°44′9″N 1°36′29″W	Ashanti
29.	Berekum	14,296	22,264	39,649	49,149	62,364		7°27′N 2°35′W	Brong-Ahafo
30.	Nkawkaw	23,219	31,785	43,703	48,503	61,785		6°33′N 0°46′W	Eastern
31.	Akim Oda	20,957	24,629	38,741	45,332	60,604		05°55′25″N 00°59′18″W	Eastern
32.	Winneba	30,778	27,105	40,017	45,954	60,331		5°21′00″N 0°37′30″W	Central
33.	Hohoe	14,775	20,994	35,277	42,550	58,155		7°9′9″N 0°28′36″E	Volta
34.	Yendi	22,072	31,633	40,336	43,908	52,774		9°25′57″N 0°0′15″W	Northern
35.	Suhum	12,421	19,298	31,044	36,650	49,398	126,403	6°2′N 0°27′W	Eastern
36.	Kintampo	N/A	13,943	28,276	N/A	49,046		8°3′8″N 1°44′5″W	Brong-Ahafo
37.	Adenta East	N/A	N/A	31,070	39,730	45,409		5°43′28″N 0°9′48″W	Greater Accra
38.	Nsawam	25,518	20,439	29,986	34,142	44,522	155,597	05°48′00″N 00°21′00″W	Eastern
39.	Mampong	13,895	20,228	31,740	37,575	42,795		7°4′N 1°24′W	Ashanti
40.	Konongo	10,881	13,677	26,735	34,509	42,550		06°37′00″N 01°13′00″W	Ashanti
41.	Asamankese	16,905	23,077	34,855	37,349	39,435		5°52′N 0°49′W	Eastern
42.	Wenchi	13,836	18,583	28,141	32,735	39,187		7°33′33″N 1°55′45″W	Brong-Ahafo
43.	Savelugu	9,895	16,965	24,937	30,529	39,092		9°37′N 0°50′W	Northern
44.	Agogo	14,710	18,879	28,271	32,859	36,797		6°48′0″N 1°5′0″W	Ashanti
45.	Anloga	14,032	18,993	20,886	30,857	36,771		5°47′31″N 0°54′01″E	Volta
46.	Prestea	5,143	16,922	21,844	33,170	35,760		05°26′00″N 02°09′00″W	Western
47.	Effiakuma	N/A	N/A	N/A	31,876	35,094		4°55′26″N 1°45′44″W	Western
48.	Tarkwa	4,702	22,107	30,631	34,544	34,941		05°18′00″N 01°59′00″W	Western
49.	Elmina	N/A	17,000	N/A	N/A	33,576		5°05′N 1°21′W	Central
50.	Dunkwa-on-Offin	N/A	16,900	N/A	N/A	33,379		5.9667°N 1.7833°W	Central
51.	Begoro	N/A	18,200	N/A	N/A	29,516		6°23′N 0°23′W	Eastern
52.	Kpandu	N/A	15,700	N/A	N/A	28,917		7°0′N 0°18′E	Volta
53.	Navrongo	N/A	N/A	N/A	N/A	27,524		10°53′5″N 1°5′25″W	Upper East
54.	Axim	N/A	13,100	N/A	N/A	27,719		4°52′N 2°14′W	Western
55.	Apam	N/A	13,400	N/A	N/A	26,466		5°16′44″N 0°44′23″W	Central
56.	Salaga	N/A	11,400	N/A	N/A	26,153		8°33′N 0°31′W	Northern
57.	Saltpond	N/A	N/A	N/A	N/A	24,689		5°12′N 1°4′W	Central
58.	Akwatia	N/A	N/A	N/A	N/A	23,766		06°03′00″N 00°48′00″W	Eastern
59.	Shama	N/A	11,200	N/A	N/A	23,699		5°1′N 1°38′W	Western
60.	Keta	N/A	12,600	N/A	N/A	23,207		5°55′N 0°59′E	Volta
61.	Nyakrom	N/A	11,600	N/A	N/A	22,911		5°37′N 0°47′W	Central
62.	Bibiani	N/A	10,200	N/A	N/A	21,583		6°13′0″N 2°21′0″W	Western
63.	Somanya	N/A	N/A	N/A	N/A	20,596		6°6′14″N 0°0′54″W	Eastern
64.	Assin Fosu	N/A	10,400	N/A	N/A	20,541		5°42′00″N 1°16′40″W	Central
65.	Nyankpala	N/A	N/A	N/A	N/A	20,013		9°24′N 0°59′W	Northern
66.	Aburi	N/A	11,531	N/A	N/A	18,701		5°51′N 0°11′W	Eastern
67.	Mumford	N/A	N/A	N/A	N/A	18,368		5°15′45″N 0°45′28″W	Central
68.	Bechem	N/A	8,800	N/A	N/A	17,677		7°05′N 2°01′W	Brong-Ahafo
69.	Duayaw Nkwanta	N/A	8,700	N/A	N/A	17,476		7°10′N 2°06′W	Brong-Ahafo
70.	Kade	N/A	10,200	N/A	N/A	16,542		06°05′N 00°50′W	Eastern
71.	Anomabu	N/A	6,800	N/A	N/A	14,389		5°10′N 1°7′W	Central
72.	Akropong	N/A	8,500	N/A	N/A	13,785		5°58′27″N 0°5′17″W	Eastern
73.	Kete-Krachi	N/A	6,400	N/A	N/A	11,788		7°48′N 0°01′W	Volta
74.	Kibi	N/A	7,200	N/A	N/A	11,677		06°10′N 00°33′W	Eastern
75.	Kpandae	N/A	5,030	N/A	N/A	11,540		8°28′12″N 0°1′12″W	Northern
76.	Mpraeso	N/A	6,900	N/A	N/A	11,190		6°34′48″N 0°43′47″W	Eastern
77.	Akim Swedru	N/A	6,400	N/A	N/A	10,379		05°53′38.24″N 01°00′45.6″W	Eastern
78.	Aboso	N/A	4,700	N/A	N/A	9,945		5°21′48″N 1°56′52″W	Western
79.	Bekwai	N/A	2,169	N/A	N/A	5,267	137,967	6°27′13″N 1°35′02″W	Ashanti
80.	Drobo	N/A	N/A	11571	N/A	25,267		7°34′59″N 2°47′08″W	Brong-Ahafo
81.	Banda Ahenkro	1,324	1,940	1,788	2,795	5,267		8°10′N 2°22′W	Brong-Ahafo
82.	Dodowa	N/A	N/A	N/A	N/A	N/A		5°53′N 0°7′E	Greater Accra
83.	Larteh Akuapim	N/A	N/A	N/A	N/A	N/A		5°56′08″N 0°04′16″W	Eastern
84.	Tumu	N/A	N/A	N/A	N/A	N/A		N/A	Upper West
85.	Goaso								Ahafo

=== Gallery ===
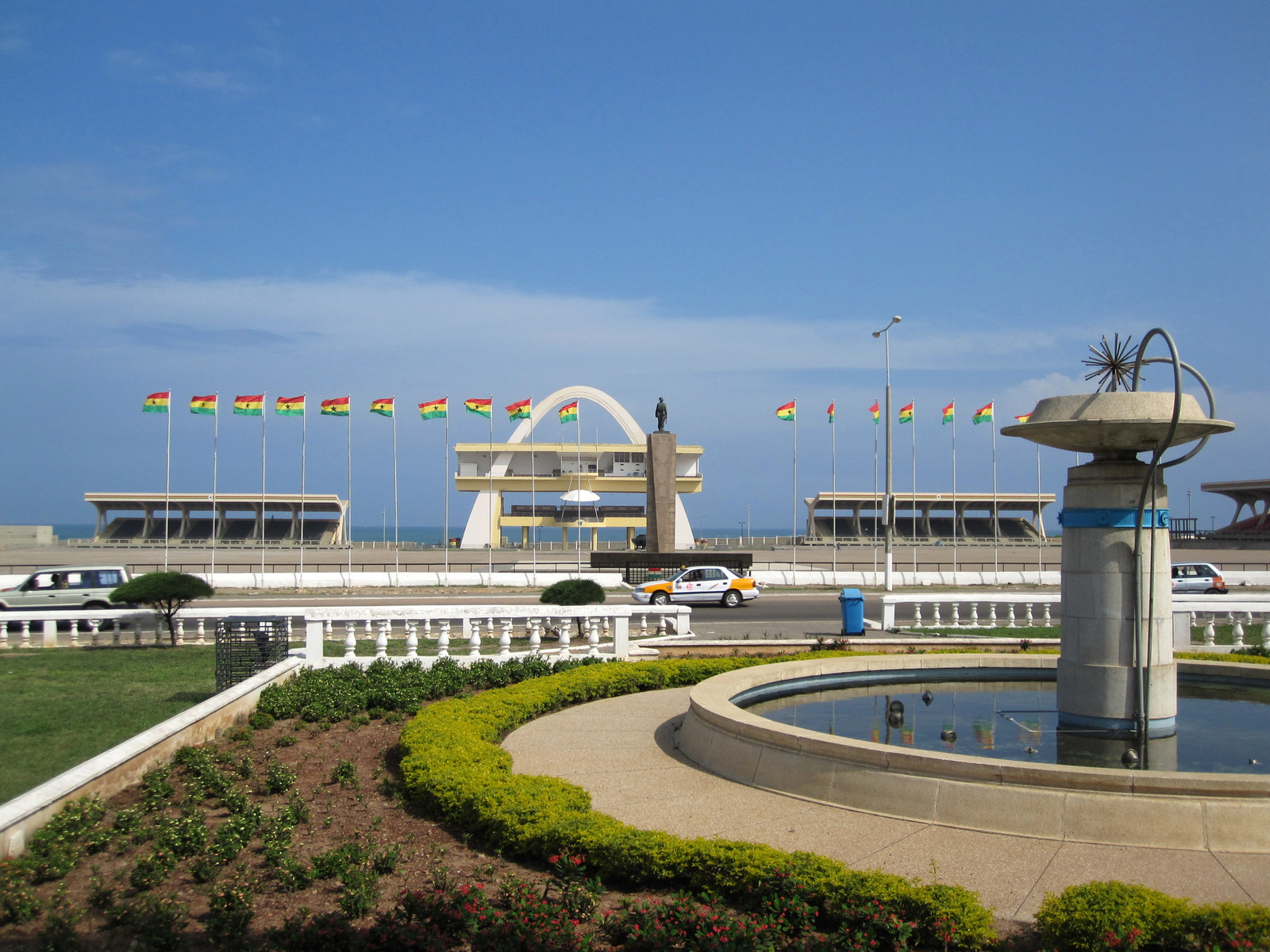
1. Accra, Greater Accra Region

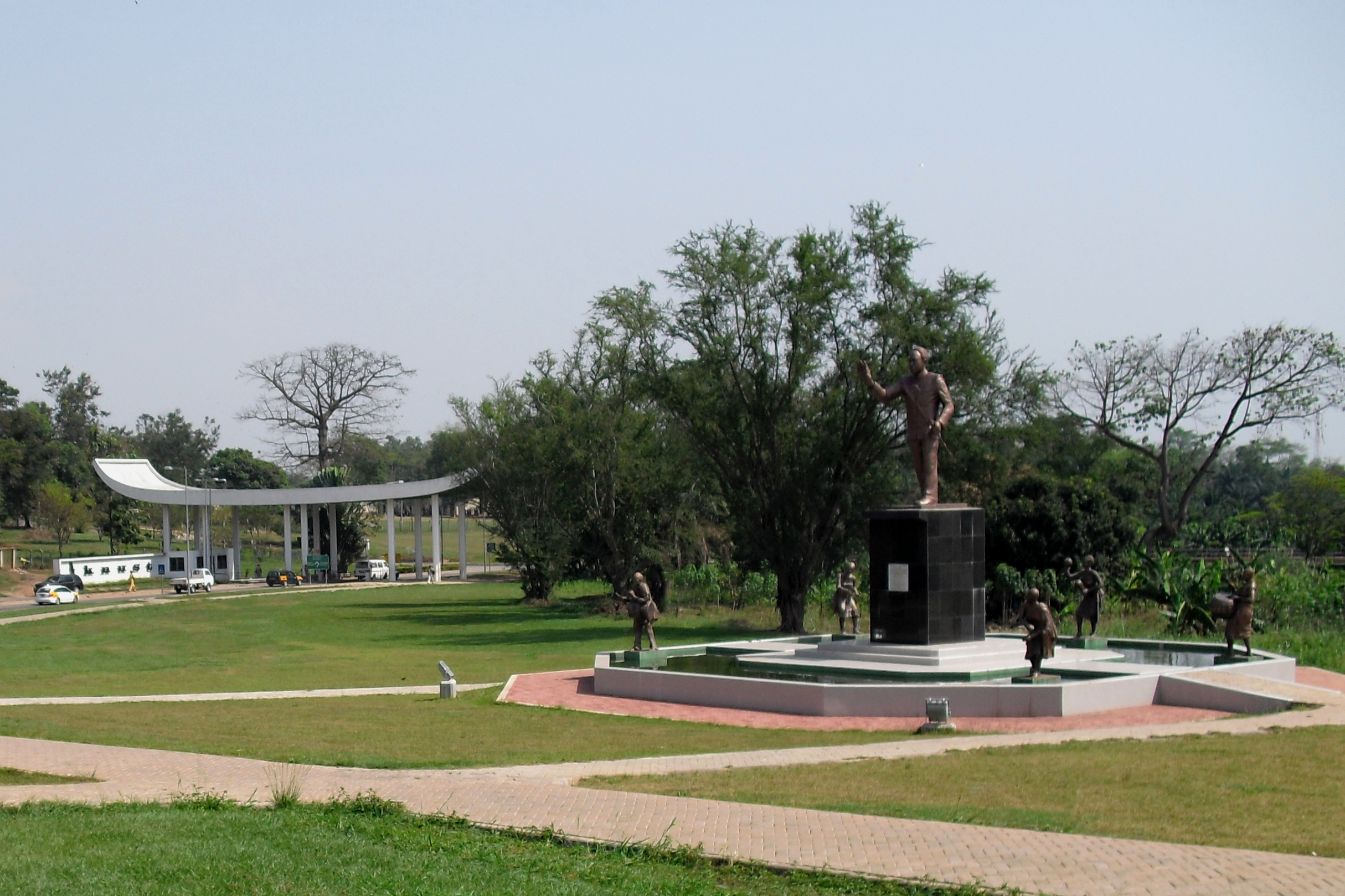
2. Kumasi, Ashanti Region

3. Tamale, Northern Region

4. Sekondi-Takoradi, Western Region

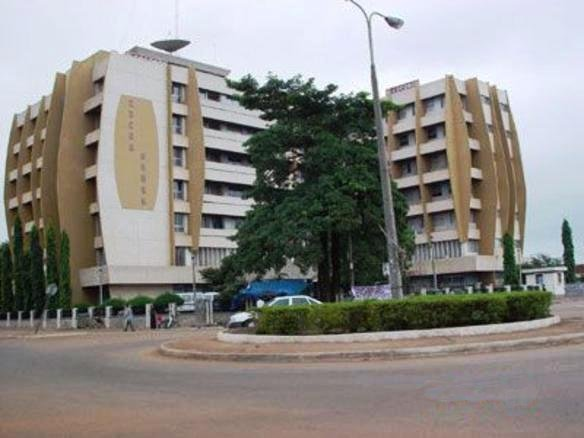
5. Sunyani, Bono Region

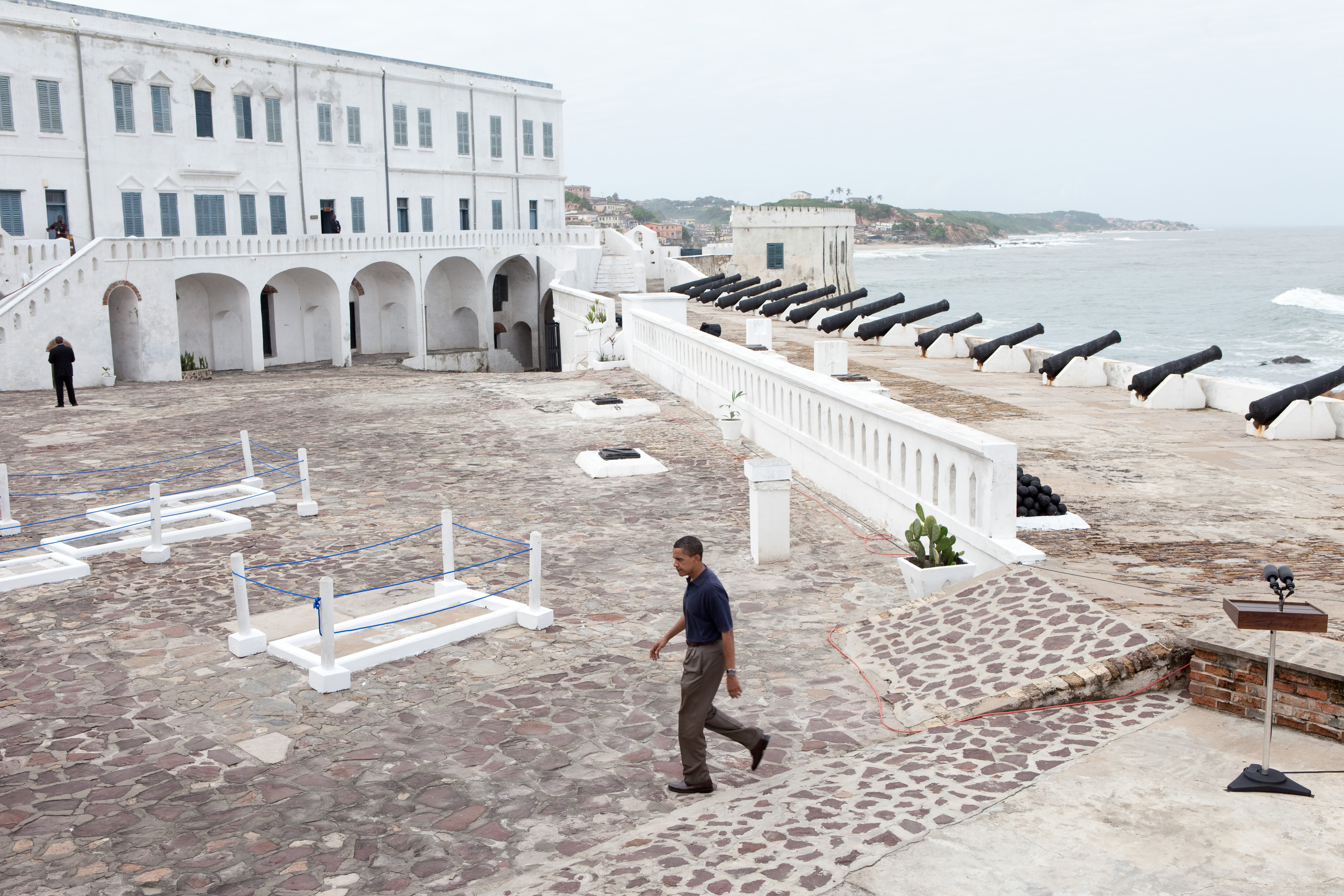
6. Cape Coast, Central Region

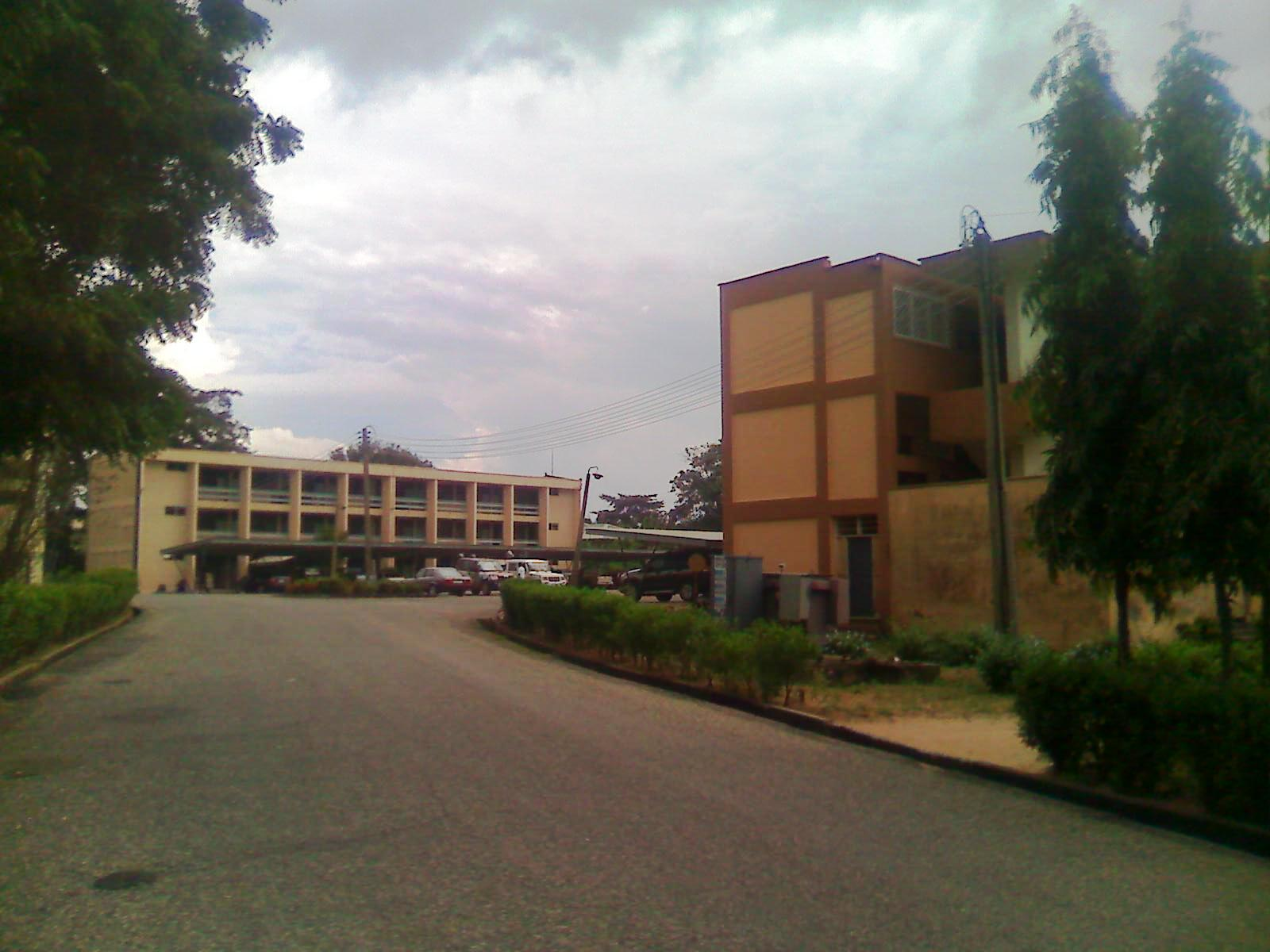
7. Koforidua, Eastern Region

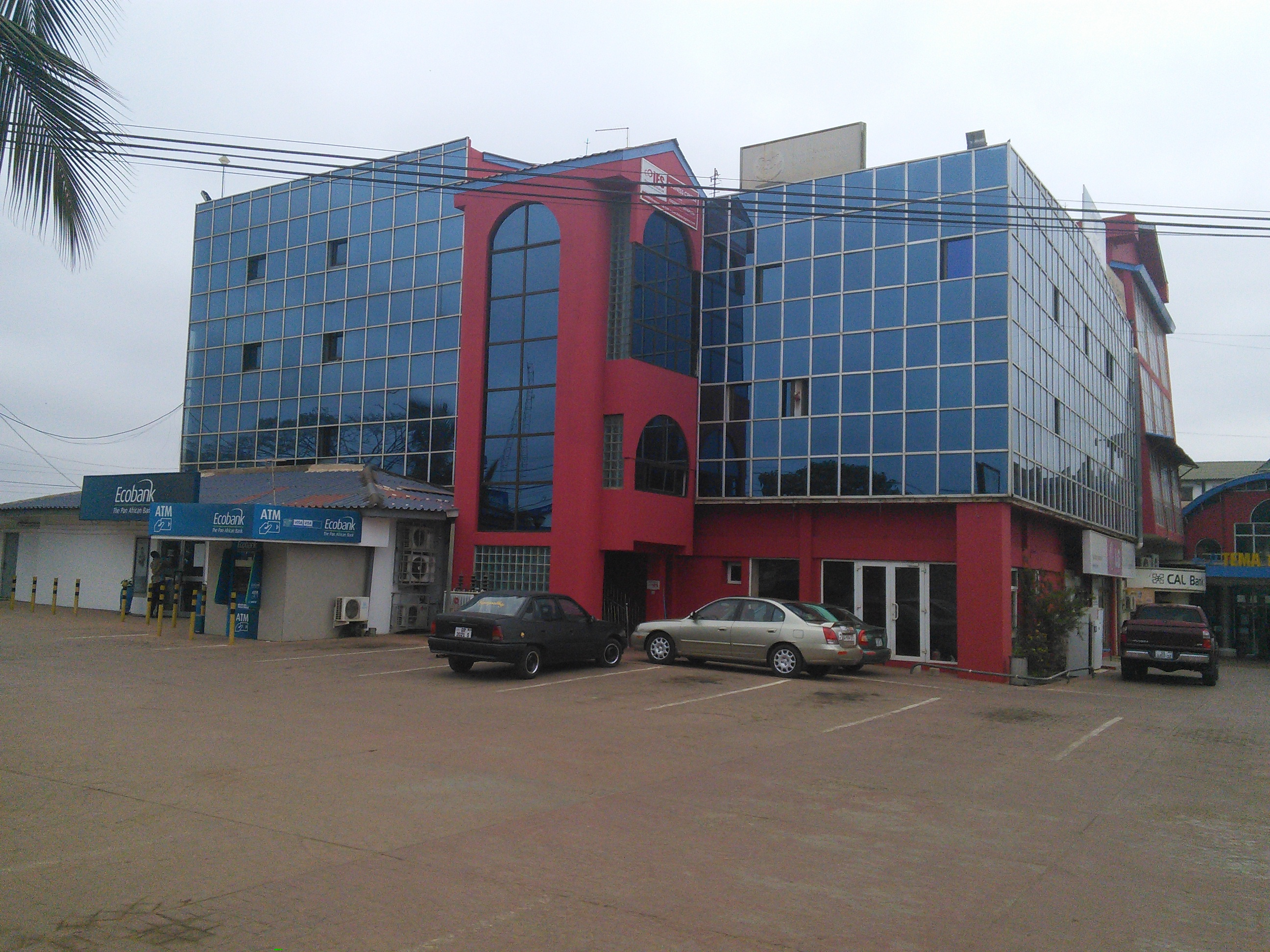
8. Tema, Greater Accra Region

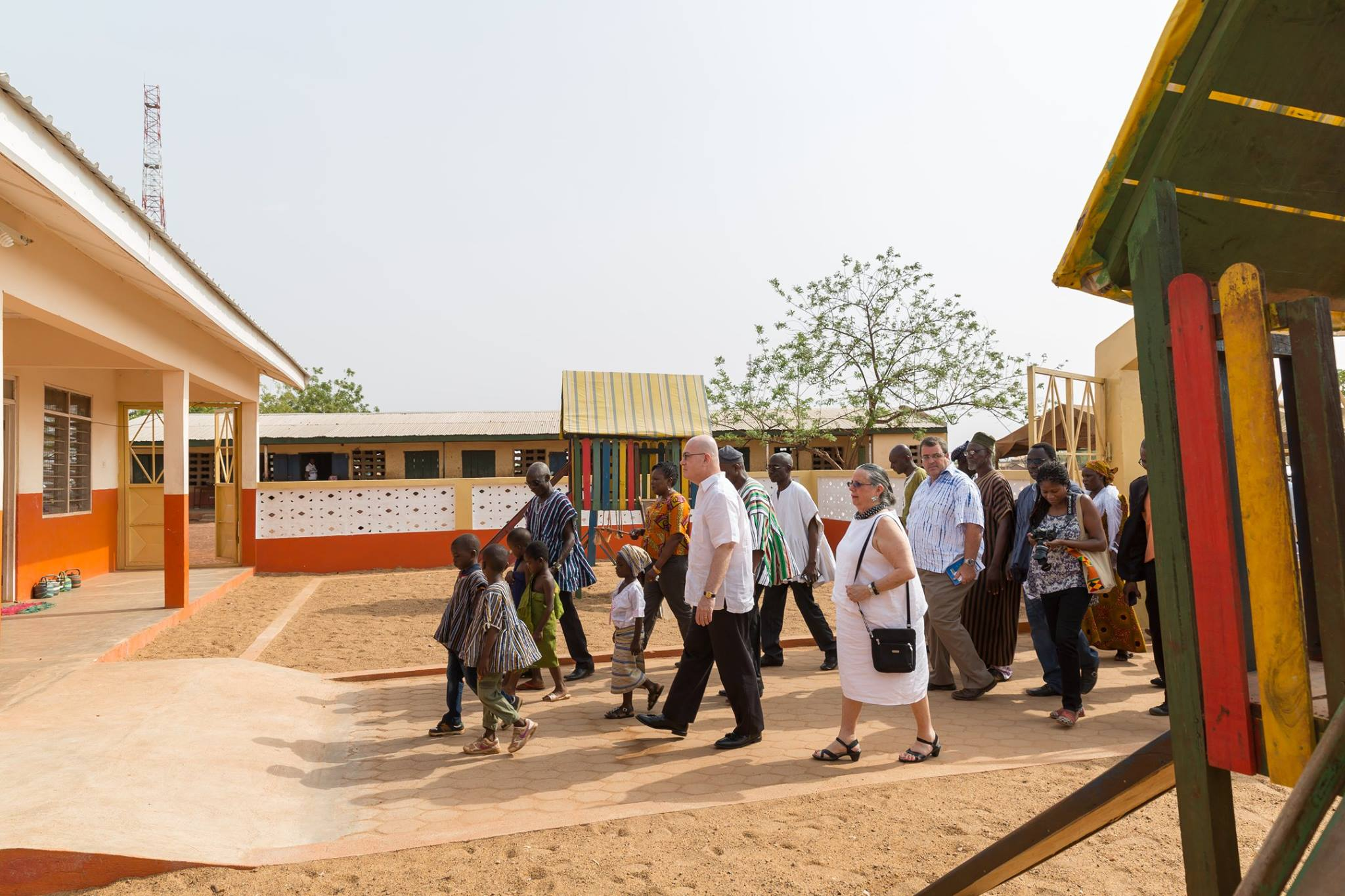
9. Nyankpala, Northern Region

== Top ten largest metropolitan areas ==
Rank	Metropolitan area	Population (2013) Census	Region
1	Accra	2,291,352	Greater Accra
2	Kumasi	2,069,350	Ashanti
3	Tamale	562,919	Northern region
4	Sekondi-Takoradi	445,205	Western region
5	Sunyani	248,496	Brong-Ahafo
6	Cape Coast	227,269	Central region
7	Obuasi	180,334	Ashanti
8	Teshie	176,597	Greater Accra
9	Tema	161,612	Greater Accra
10	Koforidua	130,810	Eastern region

== See also ==
- Urban planning in Africa (Ghana)
