= List of cemeteries in Accra =

Cemeteries located in Accra, Greater Accra Region of Ghana

The following military, mission-affiliated, public, private and royal cemeteries are located in Accra, Ghana:

- Ablekuma Cemetery
- Achimota Cemetery
- Adenta Cemetery
- Agbogba Cemetery
- Amrahia Cemetery
- Ankrah Royal Family Cemetery
- Ashongman Cemetery
- Asomdwee Park
- Awudome Cemetery
- Basel Mission Cemetery, Osu
- Bubuashie Cemetery
- Du Bois Memorial Centre
- Christiansborg Memorial Cemetery
- Christiansborg War Cemetery
- Domeabra Cemetery
- Gethsemane Memorial Garden, Shiashie
- Haatso-Ecomog Royal Cemetery
- Holy Spirit Cathedral, Accra Premises
- Kisseman Christian Village Cemetery
- Kwame Nkrumah Memorial Park and Mausoleum
- La Bethel Presbyterian Old Cemetery
- La Public Cemetery
- Madina Public Cemetery
- Mempeasem Mount Zion Presbyterian Cemetery
- Military Cemetery, Burma Camp
- Military Cemetery, Osu
- Mpoase Cemetery
- Muslim Cemetery
- Nikoi Olai Stool Royal Mausoleum
- Nungua Anglican Cemetery
- Oblogo Cemetery
- Ofankor Cemetery
- Ohenewaa Forever
- Osu Cemetery (formerly Christiansborg Civil Cemetery)
- Osu Mausoleum
- Pokuase Cemetery
- The Methodist Church Ghana Cemetery
- The Garden of Peace Cemetery, Lashibi
- Zimmermann Presbyterian Cemetery
