= Clubhouse Ghana =

NGO in Accra, Ghana

Clubhouse Ghana Mental Health Rehabilitation Center
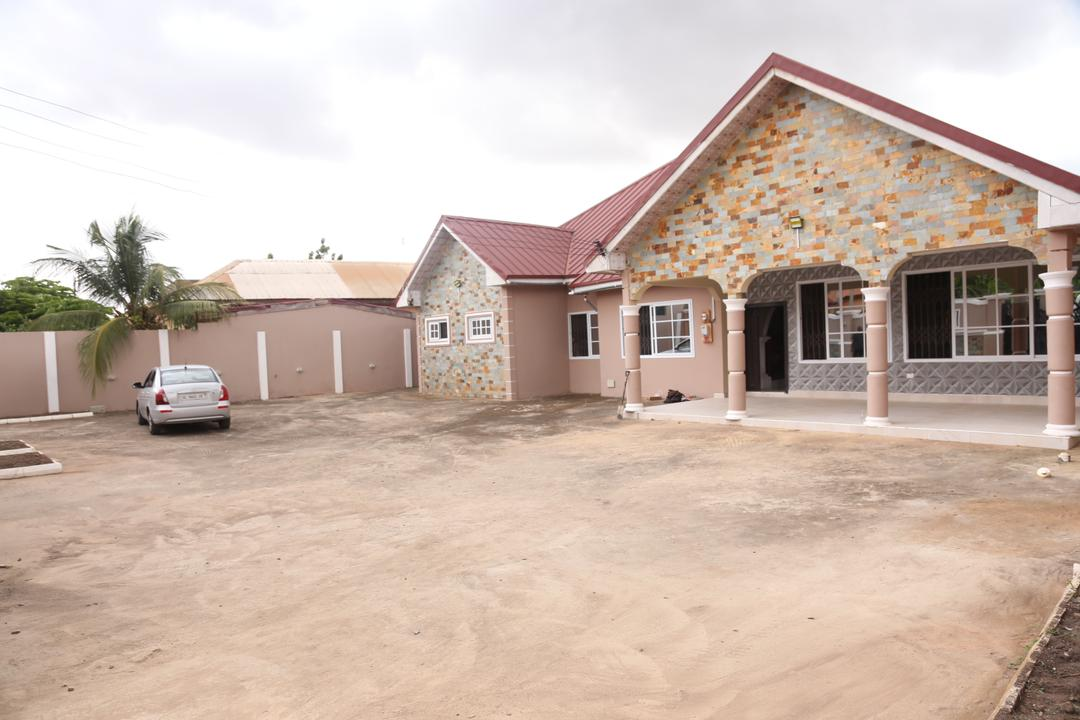
- Clubhouse Ghana office located at Oyarifa in the Greater Accra Region of Ghana
- Formation: 21 December 2021
- Founder: Mona Lisa ML Brookshire
- Headquarters: Oyarifa
- Services: Mental Health, Advocacy, Education, Empowerment
- Website: clubhouseghana.lovable.app

Clubhouse Ghana Mental Health Rehabilitation Center is an initiative under the ML4Lyfe Foundation, a non-profit organization, which focuses on addressing mental health issues in Ghana. It is located at Oyarifa in the Greater Accra Region of Ghana. It is the first-ever Clubhouse-franchised Rehabilitation Center in Ghana and also the first in West Africa.

== History ==
The organization was founded by ML Brookshire nee Blay-Miezah and was launched on 21 December 2021. As at 2023, the director of the organization was Mr. Samuel Kwakye Boaten.

Notable people such as Jewel Howard Taylor; Pat Thomas; Reggie Rockstone; Gyedu Blay-Ambolley; Dick Kuriger, CEO of the Rotary Club of Houston; Dr. Sammy Ohene, Lead Psychiatrist of Accra Psychiatric Hospital and Korle Bu; Joel Corcoran, CEO, Clubhouse International; Dr. Akwasi Osei, CEO of the Mental Health Authority in Ghana; Okoe Boye; and artistes like Pozo Hayes, Connell Thompson, Nakuye Miller took part in the launch of the organization through Zoom. Kwasi Kyei Darkwah was the host during the launch.

In June 2023, the facility admitted 22 people with mental disorder from the Pantang Psychiatric Hospital and the Accra Psychiatric Hospital.

== Operations ==
The organization was established to help revamp and re-integrate mental healthcare delivery in Ghana. It also focuses education and literacy; mother and child healthcare; water and sanitation; economic and community development among others.

== Partnerships and collaboration ==
The organization is in partnership and collaborated with Rotary Clubs located in Sekondi-Takoradi, Cantonments, Accra Industrial Area, Houston-Texas and Katy-Texas. The organization also partnered with the Ministry of Health and the Ministry of Education to achieve the aim of the organization.

== Donations ==
In April 2022, the organization in collaboration with some Rotary Clubs in Ghana presented some items to the Accra Psychiatric Hospital.
