= Tema Community 22 Polyclinic =

Health facility in Ashaiman, Ghana

- Ministry of Health

Geography
- Location: Ashaiman, Ashaiman Municipal District, Greater Accra Region, Ghana

Organisation
- Care system: Public - Ghana Health Service

Links
- Lists: Hospitals in Ghana

Tema Community 22 Polyclinic is a health facility located in Ashaiman in the Ashaiman Municipal District in the Greater Accra Region of Ghana. As at 2024, the administrator of the facility is Dr Adolph Bansah.

== History ==
In October 2021, the Korea International Cooperation Agency (KOICA) donated COVID-19 prevention and hospital items to the facility.

In November 2023, the facility was among eleven health facilities which received Splenda Sweeteners from Splenda Ghana.

In July 2024, Nii Annang Adzor, the Chief of Ashaiman pledged to support the facility during its 5th anniversary celebration.

In September 2024, FWF Microfinance Limited donated items which included one unit of baby cot and five units of three-in-one visitors’ chairs to the facility.

== Incident ==
In June 2026, a nurse was assaulted allegedly by a relative of a patient after asking the person to leave the facility. The Greater Accra Health Directorate condemned the attack on the health worker. The Union of Professional Nurses and Midwives, Ghana (UPNMG) also condemned the assault of the health worker at the facility. The Ghana Registered Nurses and Midwives Association (GRNMA) also condemned the attack. The National Association of Registered Midwives, Ghana (NARM-GH) also condemned the incident.

The suspect was arrested by the Ghana Police Service and expected to appear in court on 8 June. The man named Desmond Bosomtwe, was convicted and found guilty of assaulting senior staff midwife Priscilla Addo.
