= Francis-Xavier Kojo Sosu =

Ghanaian lawyer and politician

Hon. Francis-Xavier Kojo Sosu MP
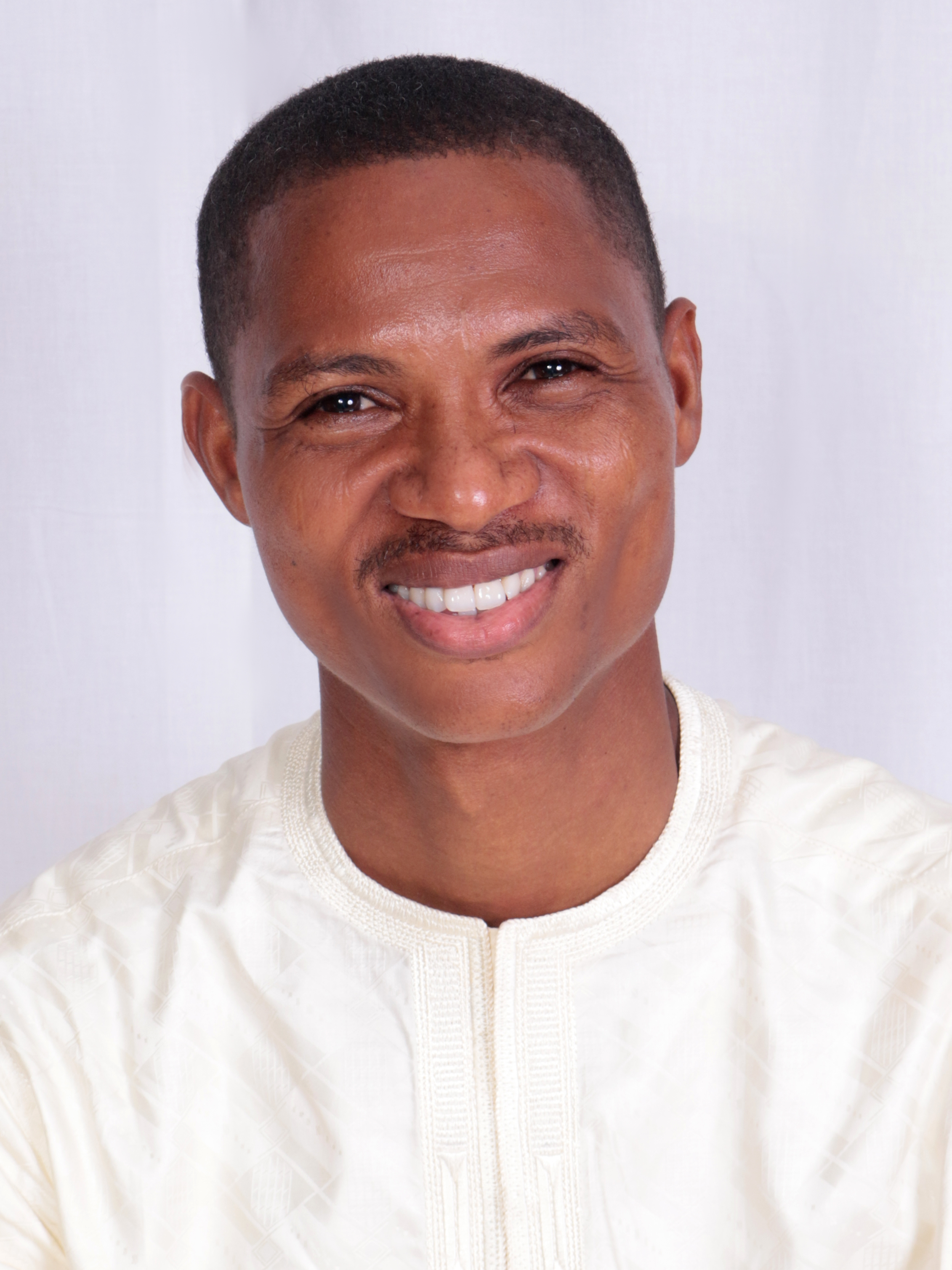

Member of Parliament for Madina Constituency
- Incumbent
- Assumed office 7 January 2021
- Preceded by: Abubakar Boniface Siddique

Personal details
- Born: Francis-Xavier Kojo Sosu; 12 February 1979 (age 47) Accra New Town
- Party: National Democratic Congress
- Spouse: Felicia Konadu Sosu
- Children: 4
- Education: University of Ghana; Ghana School of Law; University of Education
- Occupation: Human Rights Lawyer
- Profession: Lawyer
- Committees: Constitutional, Legal and Parliamentary Affairs Committee; Appointments Committee

Francis-Xavier Kojo Sosu (born 12 February 1979) is a Ghanaian lawyer and politician. He is a member of the National Democratic Congress (NDC). He is a member of the 9th parliament of the 4th Republic of Ghana representing the Madina Constituency. He is also Deputy Ranking Member of the Constitutional, Legal and Parliamentary Affairs Committee of Parliament.

== Early life and education ==
He is a native of Denu in the Volta Region but was born in Accra New Town. He attended St. John's Grammar School, Achimota-Accra. Sosu holds a Bachelor of Arts (BA) (Honors) in Sociology from the University of Ghana and a Bachelor of Law (LLB) also from the University of Ghana. He further proceeded to the Ghana School of Law for the Professional Certificate to practice law and was called to the Bar in October 2010. Sosu holds a master's degree in Oil and Gas Law (LLM) from the University of Ghana. He also has a Master of Arts (MA) degree in Economic Policy Management, from the Economics Department of University of Ghana and a Master of Philosophy (MPhil) in Conflict, Human Rights and Peace Studies from University of Education, Winneba.

Sosu earned his PhD in Law from the University of Ghana. He holds the distinction of being the first Vandal from Commonwealth Hall to obtain a PhD in Law since the establishment of the School of Law in the 1958/59 academic year.

== Career ==
Sosu is a human rights and public interest litigation lawyer. He started as a legal counsel at Logan & Associates before setting up F-X Law & Associates, a progressive Human Rights and Public Interest Law firm in Accra in 2012, which he currently serves as the Managing Partner. He has been appointed as notary public by the Supreme Court dated August 14, 2025.

== Politics ==
=== Parliamentary bid ===
Sosu was elected as the National Democratic Congress candidate for the Madina Constituency for the 2020 parliamentary Elections after getting 661 votes to beat his closest contender Sidii Abubakar, a former National Youth Organizer for the party, who polled 480 votes. Ibrahim Hussein Faila came third with 217 votes with Hajia Rukaya also getting only 16 votes. In November 2015, he lost narrowly in a similar primary against the then incumbent Amadu Bukari Sorogho. Sosu polled 1,486 votes as against the 1,738 votes polled by Sorogho who had been representing the constituency since 2005 but eventually lost to Abu-Bakar Saddique Boniface.

In the 2020 elections, Sosu beat the incumbent member of parliament, Abu-Bakar Saddique Boniface, the former Minister for Zongo and Inner City Development by getting 62,127 votes against his 46,985 votes to be declared member of parliament elect for the Madina Constituency.

=== Member of Parliament ===
Sosu was sworn in as Member of Parliament representing the Madina Constituency in the 8th Parliament of the 4th Republic of Ghana on 7 January 2021. He serves as a member on the Constitutional, Legal and Parliamentary Affairs Committee and the Appointments Committee of Parliament.

In July 2023, Sosu tabled and passed legislation to abolish capital punishment in Ghana, describing the move as a "great advancement of the human rights record of Ghana."

== Music ==
Sosu has disclosed the release of his single, "Grace for Race" prior to 7 December 2024 Ghanaian general election. Sosu goes by the stage name "Son of Grace" (SOG), he shared his inspirational path from a life on the streets where he hustled at Malam Atta Market pushing vehicles and lifting cargo before becoming a lawyer and an elected MP.

== Personal life ==
Sosu is married to Felicia Adwoa Konadu Sosu and together they have four children. He is a Christian.
