= List of TV stations in Ghana =

Ghanaian TV List

List of TV stations in Ghana is the list various television stations in Ghana.

== Greater Accra Region ==
- Pent Tv
- Angel Tv
- Konkonsa TV
- Adom TV
- Agoo TV
- Ashaiman TV
- Atinka TV
- Bryt TV
- Citi TV
- Crystal TV
- DGN
- e.tv Ghana
- EGM TV GH
- Family TV
- GHOne TV
- GTV
- GBC 2
- Homebase TV
- Kantanka TV
- Max TV
- Metro TV
- MTA Ghana
- Net 2 TV
- Obonu TV
- Oceans TV
- Onua TV
- Pan-African TV
- Praise TV
- Trotro TV
- TV Africa
- TV XYZ
- TV3
- TV 7
- UTV
- Zylofon TV
- Joy Prime
- 4Syte TV
- LwPlus TV in
- Dominion TV
- 3Music TV
- CLOG TV

== Ashanti Region ==
- ATV
- Kessben TV
- SECOND CHANCE TV
- ZTV
- GC TV
- Kingtom tv
- ROYAL TV (RTV)
- SOMPA TV

== Northern Region ==
- Prime7 TV
- NTV
- Sagani TV
- Might TV
- Zaa TV
- Saha TV
- Eeman Dawah TV
- Rahma TV
- Discovery Television (fmr)

Northern gold TV
