= Mariama Sammo =

Ghanaian judge

Mariama Sammo is a Ghanaian judge. In 2025, she was sworn in by John Mahama as a Justice of the Court of Appeal along with 20 others at the Jubilee House.

== Biography ==
In 2012, Sammo presided over a case at the Madina District Magistrate's Court Grade One.

In 2013, she was sworn in as a Circuit Court Judge by Georgina Wood. She presided over a case involving a military officer in Ho in the Volta Region of Ghana.

In 2014, she also presided over a case involving a farmer.

In 2019, she was sworn in as a High Court Judge by Nana Akuffo-Addo.

In 2020, she presided a case at the Accra High Court. The action by the Council of Elders of CPP was in keeping with the terms of the consent judgment adopted and granted by her.

In 2021, she originally presided and ruled in a case involving ENI Ghana Limited and Vitol Upstream Limited.

In 2023, she presided at the Adenta High Court in a case involving Black Sherif and Cruise People Limited.

In 2024, she presided over a case at the Adentan High Court 2. She raised a concern about indiscipline in Ghanaian societies among the youth.

In 2025, she presided over a case in Accra High Court involving Elsie Appau-Klu.

In 2026, she along with Jerome Noble Nkrumah and Francis Achibonga ordered restoration of the license of GN Savings and Loans Company Limited.
