= Taifa (disambiguation) =

A taifa was a small Islamic principality in Spain or Sicily.

Taifa may also refer to:

- Taifa, Accra, in Ghana
- Taifa, Morocco, in Taza Province
