= Ashaiman (disambiguation) =

Ashaiman is a town in Ghana. Ashaiman may also refer to:

- Ashaiman (Ghana parliament constituency)
- Ashaiman Municipal District, the district of which Ashaiman is the capital
