= List of slums in Ghana =

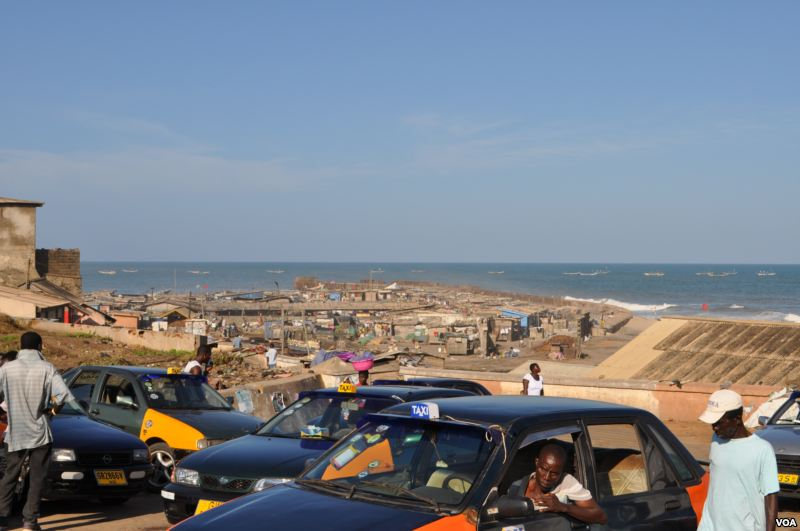
Taxi drivers waiting for fares near the beachfront slum in Accra's Jamestown

This is a list of slums in Ghana.

- Amui Djor
- Ashaiman
- Agbogbloshie
- Old Fadama
- Jamestown
- Kojokrom
- New Takoradi
- Suame Magazine
- Aboabo
- Maamobi & Nima

== See also ==
- List of slums
