= Sarah Adwoa Safo =

Ghanaian politician and lawyer

Hon Sarah Adwoa Safo

Member of the Ghana Parliament for Dome Kwabenya
- In office 7 January 2013 – 6 January 2025
- Preceded by: Aaron Mike Oquaye
- Succeeded by: Elikplim Akurugu
- President: Nana Akufo-Addo

Personal details
- Born: 28 December 1981 (age 44) Accra, Ghana
- Party: New Patriotic Party
- Relations: Kwadwo Safo Kantanka
- Children: 2
- Profession: Lawyer

Sarah Adwoa Safo (born 28 December 1981) is a Ghanaian lawyer and politician. She is a member of the New Patriotic Party and member of Parliament since 2013 for the Dome Kwabenya Constituency of the Greater Accra Region of Ghana. She was the Minister for Gender, Children and Social Protection until 28 July 2022 when she was dismissed by President Nana Akufo-Addo.

== Early life and education ==
Adwoa Safo was born to Ghanaian industrialist and pastor, Kwadwo Safo Kantanka on Monday, 28 December 1981. Her father is the founder of Kristo Asafo Church and locally assembled Kantanka vehicles. She was home-tutored and wrote and passed her GCE A’ Level in 1998. At age 17, she entered the University of Ghana Faculty of Law where she obtained Bachelor of Law (L.L.B.) degree in 2002. Safo was the vice-president of the Law Students Union (LSU) in her final year. She then continued to the Ghana School of Law and was called to the Bar in October 2004 at the age of 22. She holds an LLM from George Washington University. In September 2022, she graduated from the University of Nottingham with a Postgraduate Diploma in Public Procurement law and Policy.

== Career ==
She worked briefly with the Office of the Attorney General for the District of Columbia, Washington DC in the United States and thereafter returned to Ghana. In 2005, she joined the law firm Kulendi @ law, then Zoe, Akyea & Co, as a private legal practitioner and concurrently served on the Mediation Committee of the Legal Aid Board of Ghana as a Mediator.

She worked as the first legal officer of the Public Procurement Authority (PPA) for two (2) years and was very instrumental in the formulation of the proposals that formed the basis for the creation of the Appeals and Complaint Panel of PPA and the change of name of the Public Procurement Board to Public Procurement Authority.

She was first elected as the Member of Parliament for Dome Kwabenya in 2012.

She was re-elected in the 2016 and 2020 elections. She was Deputy Majority Leader of the 7th Parliament of the Republic of Ghana and is the only female MP in Ghana to ascend to the number 2 position of the Majority front.

She was appointed Minister of State in charge of Government Procurement in 2017, serving till 2021, under Nana Addo Dankwa Akufo-Addo, 5th president of the 4th Republic of Ghana.

In the eighth parliament under the fourth Republic of Ghana, Akufo-Addo appointed her as the Minister for Gender, Children and Social Protection. She served in this capacity until 28 July 2022 when she was relieved of her duties.

== Politics ==
Adwoa Safo is a member of New Patriotic Party and represent Dome Kwabenya constituency in the 6th, 7th and Eighth Parliament of the Fourth Republic of Ghana.

=== 2012 election ===
Sarah Adwao Safo contested the Dome Kwabenya constituency parliamentary seat during the 2012 Ghanaian general election on the ticket of New Patriotic Party and won with 63,373 votes representing 63.75% of the total votes. She was elected over the parliamentary candidate for National Democratic Congress Sophia Karen Ackuaku who had 35,366 votes which is equivalent to 35.58%, Ernest Kwesi Anyornisi of Progressive People's Party had 312 votes representing 0.31%, Abubakar Kwashie Gege Ebla of PNC who had 188 votes representing 0.19%, Franklin Frimpong- Mansu polled 107 votes representing 0.11% and the parliamentary candidate for NDP Sam Mireku had 56 votes representing 0.06% of the total votes.

==== 2016 election ====
Adwao Safo was re-elected as a member of parliament for Dome Kwabenya constituency on the ticket of New Patriotic Party in the 2016 Ghanaian general election with 63,488 votes representing 67.99%. She was elected over Nurudeen Mohammed of National Democratic Congress, Martha Akpah Yeboah of Convention People's Party and Abdul Kadir Issah of People's National Convention. They had 29,392 votes, 336 votes and 157 votes respectively which is equivalent to 31.48%, 0.36% and 0.17% of the total votes.

===== 2020 election =====
She was again elected as the member of parliament for Dome Kwabenya constituency on the ticket of New Patriotic Party during the 2020 Ghanaian general election with 75, 041 votes representing 58.4% of the total votes. She was elected over Faustina Elikplim Akurugu of National Democratic Congress, Kofi Kwachie Asante of LPG, Anderson Adongo Emmanuel of IND and Abdul Kadir Issah of People's National Convention. They obtained 52,262 votes, 804 votes, 271 votes and 221 votes, respectively, equivalent to 40.6%, 0.6%, 0.2% and 0.2% of the total votes.

She lost in the 2024 NPP parliamentary primaries to Micheal Oquaye Jnr who obtained 1,194 votes against 328 by Adwoa.

===== 2024 elections =====
Sarah Adwoa Safo, who represented the Dome Kwabenya constituency in Parliament since 2012, lost her seat in the 2024 general elections. In the New Patriotic Party (NPP) primaries held on January 27, 2024, she was defeated by Mike Oquaye Jnr, the son of former Speaker of Parliament, Professor Mike Oquaye. Oquaye Jnr secured 1,194 votes, while Adwoa Safo received 328 votes.

This development indicate that Sarah Adwoa Safo is no longer serving as a Member of Parliament.

== Personal life ==
Adwoa Safo who was born at Ashanti Bekwai, Ghana got married on Saturday, 17 August 2019. She is a Christian. She has two kids with Assin North member of parliament Mr. Kennedy Agyapong.

== Awards and recognition ==
Adwoa was a nominee for the Nobles Forum Award in 2012. She was honored by Glitz Africa as one of the Top 100 Women of the Year.
