= Pantang, Nurses Training College =

The Pantang Nurses' Training College is a public tertiary health institution located at Pantang in the Greater Accra Region of Ghana. The college is in the Accra Metropolitan Assembly. The activities of the institution is supervised by the Ministry of Education. The University of Cape Coast awards a Diploma in Nursing after students from the institution have successfully completed a three-year nursing training programme. The institution is accredited by the National Accreditation Board. The Nurses and Midwifery Council (NMC) regulates the activities, curriculum and examination of the student nurses and midwives. The council's mandate is enshrined under section 4(1) of N.R.C.D 117. The college specializes in the training of psychiatric nurses.
