= Lebanon, Ashaiman =

- Interactive map of Lebanon, Ashaiman
- Coordinates: 5°44′41″N 0°2′40″W
- Country: Ghana
- Region: Greater Accra Region

Lebanon is a town in the Greater Accra Region of Ghana and shares boundary with Ashaiman and Zenu. The town is divided into zones, from zone 1 to 5.

It is characterised by a mix of residential housing and local businesses, typical of the bustling Ashaiman municipal area.
