= Peduase Presidential Lodge =

- Interactive map of the Peduase Presidential Lodge area

General information
- Type: Presidential retreat / state guest accommodation
- Architectural style: Modernist / colonial-era institutional resort
- Location: Peduase, Akuapim South Municipal District, Eastern Region, Ghana
- Coordinates: 5.804435°N 0.181292°W
- Current tenants: President of Ghana, visiting dignitaries
- Completed: 1959
- Client: Government of Ghana
- Owner: Government of Ghana

Technical details
- Floor count: 4
- Grounds: (approx. figure not published)

Design and construction
- Architect: (not publicly documented)

Other information
- Facilities: Library, swimming pool, theatre complex, guest suites

Peduase Presidential Lodge is a state residence and retreat located in Peduase on the Akuapem Ridge near Aburi in Ghana's Eastern Region. Completed in 1959 during the presidency of Kwame Nkrumah, the lodge has served as a holiday residence for presidents and a venue for national meetings.

== History ==
=== Conception and construction ===
The lodge was conceived to provide a hill‑top retreat for the head of state, offering cooler climate conditions than Accra and promoting development in the surrounding region. Construction was completed in 1959 under Nkrumah's government.

=== Use by presidents ===
During Ghana's Second Republic and Third Republic, it served as the official temporal residence for presidents such as Edward Akufo-Addo and Hilla Limann.

=== Decline and rehabilitation ===
By the early 2000s, the lodge fell into disrepair, with infrastructure deteriorating due to lack of maintenance. A major rehabilitation programme was launched by the government in the mid‑2000s.

=== Modern usage ===
The lodge continues to host presidential retreats, cabinet meetings, and state events.

== Architecture and facilities ==
Peduase Presidential Lodge is a four‑storey building situated on a ridge with panoramic views. Facilities include guest suites, a library, a theatre complex, and indoor/outdoor recreational spaces such as a swimming pool.

== Land and compensation issues ==
In 2004, the Government of Ghana pledged compensation to landowners whose property was acquired for the lodge and associated projects.

== See also ==
- Aburi Botanical Gardens
- Jubilee House
