= Borteyman =

Town in Greater Accra Region, Ghana

- Location within Ghana
- Country: Ghana
- Region: Greater Accra Region
- District: Kpone Katamanso Municipal District
- Time zone: GMT
  - Summer (DST): GMT
- Postcode district: GB
- Area code: 030

Borteyman is a community in the Kpone Katamanso district in the Greater Accra region of Ghana.

== Facilities ==
=== Sports complex ===
It is the location of the $145 million sports complex which would be used for the 2023 African Games which is known as the Borteyman Sports Complex. The sports complex has the following facilities: 400-metre 6-lane athletics warm-up track with playing field for football; Washrooms for male and female; spectators stand for about 500 people; A thousand-seater competition swimming pool, collapsible to five hundred (500) seater. 8-lane competition swimming; 8-Lane warm-up swimming Pool; five hundred seater (500) temporary dome (handball, judo, karate, taekwondo, etc.); a thousand-seater (1,000) multi-purpose sports hall (badminton, boxing, volleyball, weightlifting, etc.); five (5) tennis courts complex which includes a thousand-seater (1,000) center court covered spectator stand with a VVIP viewing stand) and space for children's playground. Nana Akufo-Addo cut the sod for the commencement for the construction of the sports complex.

=== Housing project ===
It is also the location of the affordable housing project by the State Housing Company Limited which consists of five blocks with 72 units.

== See also ==
- Borteyman Sports Complex
