= Oyarifa =

- Town
- Location within Ghana
- Coordinates: 5°46′14″N 0°10′50″W
- Country: Ghana
- Region: Greater Accra Region
- District: La Nkwantanang Municipal Assembly
- Elevation: 236 ft (72 m)
- Time zone: GMT
  - Summer (DST): GMT

Oyarifa is a town in La Nkwantanang, a district in the Greater Accra Region of Ghana.

== Town structure ==
The town is under the jurisdiction of the Ga East Municipal District and is in the Abokobi-Madina constituency of the Ghana parliament.
