= Awaga =

Ghanaian sound engineer and DJ

- Born: Albert McCarthy Boateng; 20 August 1994 (age 31); Ashaiman, Ghana
- Origin: Ashanti Region, Ghana
- Genres: Afrobeats; Afropop; Hiplife; Dancehall; Reggae; Hip hop
- Occupations: Record Producer, Sound Engineer, Disc jockey, Singer
- Instruments: Drums Machine, Synthesizer, Sampler, Piano
- Years active: 2014–present
- Labels: Too Easy Music, KESSOVI ENTERTAINMENT

Albert McCarthy Boateng, professionally known as Awaga, is a Ghanaian record producer, sound engineer and disc jockey.

== Early life ==
Boateng Albert was born on August 20, 1994.

== Career ==
Awaga began his career in 2014, combining beat making with side mixing and mastering. He has worked with artists such as Stonebwoy and R2Bees.

== Discography ==
His major productions include Live In Love (Livingstone EP) by Stonebwoy which was considered for 2017 Grammy Award nominations, "We Made It" by Stonebwoy ft. R2Bees, "Enku Lenu" by Stonebwoy, "Guy Guy" by Stonebwoy ft Bisa Kdei, "Behw3 " by Dj Killer Fingers ft VVIP & Miyaki, "Anafra" by Miyaki, "Jah Love" by Eye Judah, "Support" by Eye Judah, "Beautiful Soul" by Eye Judah, "Sugar" by Dawuni X Dawuni(DXD) and "Jah Jah" by Netherlands-based Ghanaian reggae / dancehall artiste Dominiq.

In 2017, his first project The Shanti Riddim featured 30 artists from Africa and around the globe.

== Recognition ==
Year	Award ceremony	Award title	Result
2018	3rdtv Music Video Award	Best Producer	Nominated
2018	Ashaiman Music Awards	Best Producer	Nominated
2019	Ashaiman Music Awards	Best Producer	Nominated
