= Bansa =

- Village
- Location within Ghana
- Coordinates: 5°36′48″N 0°12′07″W
- Country: Ghana
- Region: Greater Accra Region
- District: Ga East Municipal
- Elevation: 203 ft (62 m)
- Time zone: GMT
  - Summer (DST): GMT

Bansa may also refer to a village in Nissing, Karnal district, Haryana, India.

Bansa is a village in the Ga East Municipal district, a district in the Greater Accra Region of Ghana.

== Village structure ==
The village is under the jurisdiction of the Ga East Municipal District and is in the Abokobi-Madina constituency of the Ghana parliament.
