= Dome-Kwabenya =

Constituency in Ghana

Dome Kwabenya
- constituency for the Parliament of Ghana
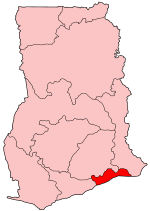
- District: Ga East District
- Region: Greater Accra Region of Ghana

Current constituency
- Created: 2004
- Party: National Democratic Congress
- MP: Elikplim Akurugu

Dome Kwabenya is one of the constituencies represented in the Parliament of Ghana. It elects one Member of Parliament (MP) by the first past the post system of election. Dome Kwabenya is located in the Ga East district of the Greater Accra Region of Ghana.

== Boundaries ==
The seat is located within the Ga East District of the Greater Accra Region of Ghana. It was formed prior to the 2004 December presidential and parliamentary elections by carving the new Dome Kwabenya out of the Abokobi-Madina constituencies.

== Members of Parliament ==
First elected	Member	Party
2004	Aaron Mike Oquaye	New Patriotic Party
2012	Sarah Adwoa Safo	New Patriotic Party
2024	Elikplim Akurugu	National Democratic Congress

== Elections ==
2024 Ghanaian general election: Dome Kwabenya
Party	Candidate	Votes	%	±%
NDC	Faustina Elikplim Akurugu	50,967	49.61	
NPP	Michael Aaron Yaw Nii Nortey Oquaye	50,699	49.61	
PPP	Remy Paa Kow Edmundson	302	2.95	—
People's National Convention (Ghana)	Dora Nyarko	220	2.15	—
Majority		268		—
Turnout				—
Registered electors				

2012 Ghanaian parliamentary election:Dome Kwabenya Source:
Party	Candidate	Votes	%	±%
New Patriotic Party	Sarah Adwoa Safo	99,402	63.75%	6.15
National Democratic Congress	Sophia Kareen Ackuaku	35,356	35.57	−3.87
People's National Convention	Ernest Kwashie Gege Ebla	188	0.19	−0.51
Independent Candidate	Franklin Frempong Manso	107	0.11	N/A
National Democratic Party	Sam Mireku	66	0.07	N/A
Majority		64,146	73.57	55.37
Turnout		—	—	—

2008 Ghanaian parliamentary election:Dome Kwabenya Source: Ghana Home Page
Party	Candidate	Votes	%	±%
New Patriotic Party	Aaron Michael Oquaye	35,321	57.6	−7.9
National Democratic Congress	Sabah Zita Okaikoi	24,163	39.4	+7.1
Convention People's Party	Emelia Osei	1,249	2.0	+1.3
People's National Convention	Abubakar Kwashie Gege Ebla	431	0.7	−0.7
Democratic Freedom Party	Christiana Affenyi	81	0.1	N/A
Democratic People's Party	Mohammed Salisu Sulemana	52	0.1	N/A
Majority		11,158	18.2	−15.0
Turnout		—	—	—

2004 Ghanaian parliamentary election:Dome Kwabenya Source: Electoral Commission of Ghana
Party	Candidate	Votes	%	±%
New Patriotic Party	Aaron Michael Oquaye	42,914	65.5	N/A
National Democratic Congress	Isaac Akanwuti Adama	21,161	32.3	N/A
People's National Convention	Abubakar Kwashie Gege Ebla	944	1.4	N/A
Convention People's Party	Raphael Agboli	481	0.7	N/A
Majority		21,753	33.2	N/A
Turnout		65,855	82.5	N/A

== See also ==
- List of Ghana Parliament constituencies
