= Elikplim Akurugu =

Ghanaian politician

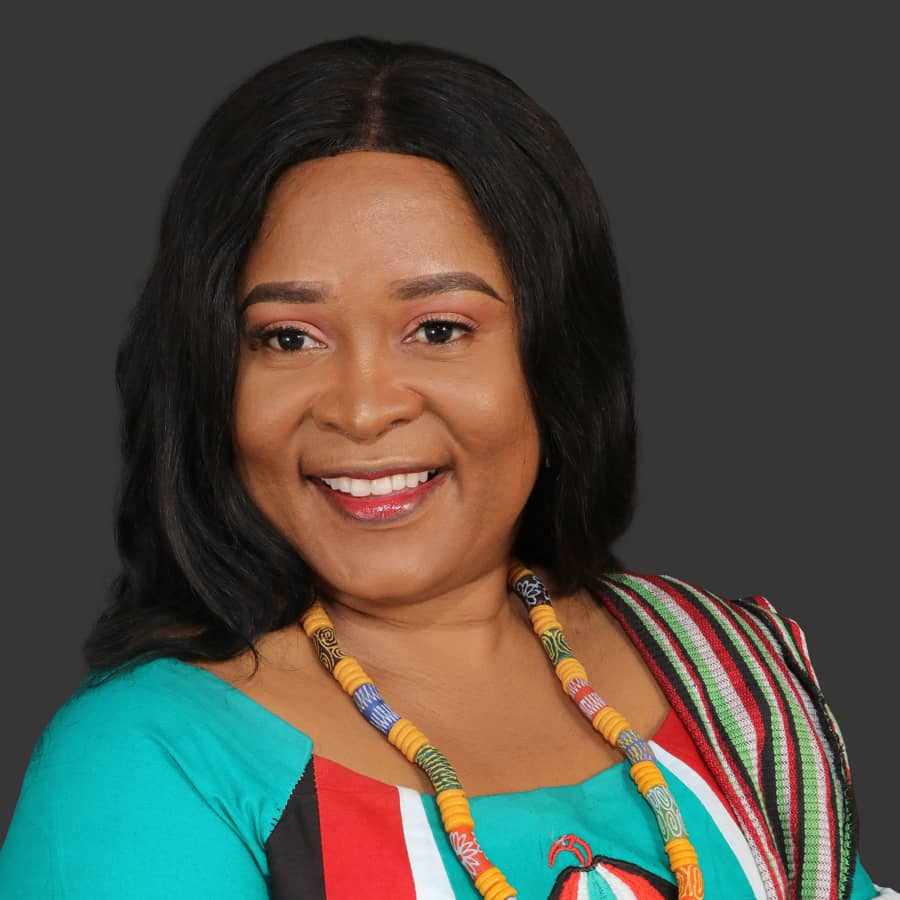

Member of Parliament
- In office 7 January 2024 – 6 January 2029
- Preceded by: Sarah Adwoa Sarfo
- Parliamentary group: National Democratic Congress
- Constituency: Dome-Kwabenya

Faustina Elikplim Akurugu is a Ghanaian politician and the Member of Parliament for the Dome-Kwabenya Constituency in the Greater Accra Region of Ghana.

== Early life and education ==
Akurugu was born on 8 April 1975 and hails from Adina in the Volta Region of Ghana. She had her secondary education from the Bolgatanga Girls Senior High School and she further went to the University of Ghana for her bachelor of arts degree. She further attended the Methodist University College where she graduated with a Master of Philosophy.

== Career ==
Akurugu began her career as a field officer at the World Vision Ghana.

=== Political career ===
Akurugu a member of the National Democratic Congress.

In the 2020 Ghanaian general election, she lost to Sarah Adwoa Sarfo after securing 44 percent of the parliamentary votes whiles Sarfo had about 75,000 votes.

In May 2023, she contested and won the NDC primaries after she had 1,564 votes.

In the 2024 Ghanaian general election, she defeated the NPP candidate, Mike Oquaye Junior. She secured 50,967 votes whilst Oquaye Junior had 50,669.

In March 2026, she cut the sod for the construction of 8.2 km and 5.2 km roads in the Ga East Municipal District.

== Personal life ==
Akurugu's father was Mr. Faustinus Rosiyah Anam. She is a Christian.

== Donations ==
In March 2026, Akurugu donated sports equipment and cash to the Ga East Municipal Education Directorate and their sports teams.

In October 2025, she donated GH¢150,000 to 150 students in the Dome-Kwabenya constituency.
