= Pantang =

Town in Greater Accra Region, Ghana

- Village
- Location within Ghana
- Coordinates: 5°43′04″N 0°11′22″W
- Country: Ghana
- Region: Greater Accra Region
- District: Ga East Municipal
- Elevation: 243 ft (74 m)
- Time zone: GMT
  - Summer (DST): GMT

Pantang is a village in the Ga East Municipal district, a district in the Greater Accra Region of Ghana.

== Village structure ==
The village is under the jurisdiction of the Ga East Municipal District and is in the Abokobi-Madina constituency of the Ghana parliament.
