= Kwadwo Safo Kantanka =

Ghanaian businessman (1948–2025)

- Born: 26 August 1948; Bekwai, Ashanti Region, Gold Coast (now Ghana)
- Died: 11 September 2025 (aged 77); Ghana
- Occupations: Businessman, pastor
- Years active: 1971–2025
- Known for: Founder of Kantanka Automobile and Kristo Asafo Mission
- Website: kantankaautomobile.com.gh

Kwadwo Safo Kantanka (also known as Prof. Emeritus Apostle Kwadwo Safo, 26 August 1948– 11 September 2025) was a Ghanaian businessman, and pastor. He founded Kantanka Automobile, a Ghana-based automotive company, and the Kristo Asafo Mission, a religious and industrial organization.

Safo is known for his contributions to local manufacturing and technological innovation in Ghana, particularly through vehicles like the Omama SUV and Onantefo pickup truck, designed for African markets.

== Biography ==
Kwadwo Safo Kantanka was born in Bekwai, Ashanti, He reportedly always had passion for science and technology and grew up desiring to pursue and develop his talent in that space. After completing basic education, he attended the Ghana Technical Works Institute in Kumasi, where he studied engineering, and later worked as a welder at the Volta Aluminium Company (VALCO) and other firms.

In 1969, Safo founded the Kristo Asafo Mission, initially as a prayer group. In 1971, the Mission became an African-initiated church, with it later expanding into manufacturing electronics, agricultural tools, and automobiles. The Mission promotes the renewal and development of Africa and teaches that, as the Holy Spirit dwells within all humans, all humans are gods themselves. Heaven and Hell are also described as states of mind rather than actual locations.

Safo established Kantanka Automobile in 1994 to produce vehicles suited for African conditions. The company began manufacturing in 1998, using locally sourced components for models like the Omama SUV and Onantefo pickup truck. In 2012, using the services of the Chinese company Chongqing Big Science & Technology, Kantanka Automobile established an assembly plant in Accra in order to produce cars from knock-down kits. Kantanka vehicles are assembled in Ghana using parts imported from China; the assembly process does require electricity. Completed vehicles are both sold domestically and exported to other West African countries, including Nigeria and Ivory Coast.

Safo died in Ghana on 11 September 2025.

== Personal life ==
Safo was married to Oheneyere Akosua Safo and had six children. Sarah Adwoa Safo, a former member of parliament, is one of his children.

== Awards and Achievements ==
- In 2017, Safo Kantanka was awarded with the Innovative Pioneer Award by the Grow, Unite, Build Africa (GUBA)
