= Abokobi =

- District Capital
- Location in Ghana
- Coordinates: 5°44′N 0°12′W
- Country: Ghana
- Region: Greater Accra Region
- District: Ga East District
- Elevation: 230 ft (70 m)

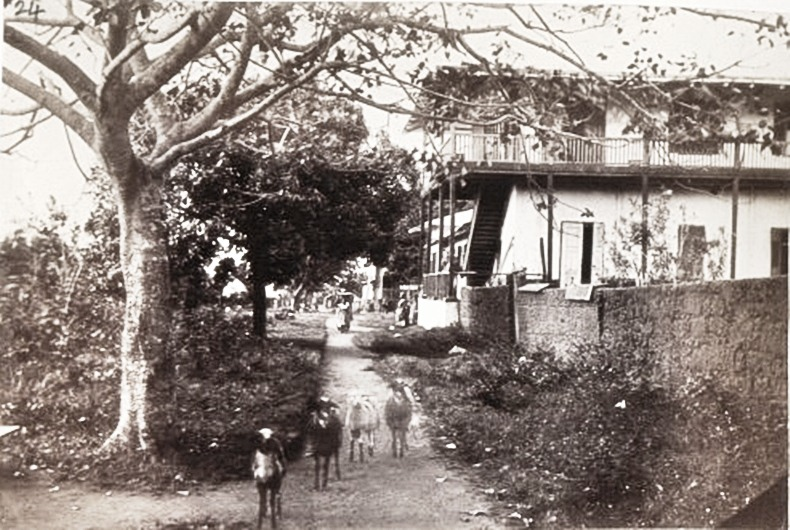
German Missionary Station, 1870s

Abokobi is a small town and is the capital of Ga East Municipal District, an MMDA located within the Greater Accra Region of Ghana.

The settlement was founded in 1854 by missionaries of the "Basler Missionsgesellschaft" (Basel Mission) for Christian refugees, who had left Osu (the former Danish-Accra, around Christiansborg) after the British colonial government had bombarded Osu from the Sea in response to the refusal of the inhabitants to pay the newly introduced head tax.

== Town structure ==
The town is under the jurisdiction of the Ga East District and is in the Abokobi-Madina constituency of the Ghana parliament.
