= Ebi Bright =

Ghanaian politician

Ebi Bright is a Ghanaian politician, a development communicator, wife of NDC MP for South Dayi constituency, Rockson Nelson Dafeamakpor, and a former actress who currently serves as the Metropolitan Chief Executive of Tema. She was appointed to this position in May 2025, and she is the first woman to serve as Metropolitan Chief Executive of the Tema Metropolitan Assembly. Ebi Bright was known in Ghana's film industry and as a social activist before she joined politics.

== Early life and education ==
Ebi Bright's mother comes from Ada in Ghana, while her father is from Bayelsa State, Nigeria. Although Ebi Bright was born in Nigeria, she grew up in Ghana. Ebi Bright's background played a crucial role in her career as a social activist. She is happily married to Ghanaian politician Rockson-Nelson Dafeamekpor.

Ebi Bright pursued a programme in Development Communication from the African University College of Communications in Accra, Ghana. To improve her leadership and management skills, Ebi Bright pursued a course in General Management from the University of Leicesterin the United Kingdom. Ebi Bright also speaks French, as she obtained four language certificates from the Centre International de Recherche et d’Études de Languesin France.

== Career ==
=== Entertainment ===
Before she entered politics, she had appeared in over 20 films. She became popular after the movie she appeared in, which was produced by Hero Productions, titled The Game. It is through the arts that she got the platform to mobilize the community and later venture into politics.

=== Political career ===
Ebi Bright is a member of the National Democratic Congress (NDC). Her first entry into politics was the contest for the position of Member of Parliament (MP) for the Tema Central Constituency. Although she did not win the contest, she became known for her activities in the constituency.

Ebi Bright was confirmed as the Metropolitan Chief Executive of Tema Metropolitan Assembly on the 9th of May 2025, with overwhelming endorsement from the assembly members. It is through her appointment that women were able to have a say in the governance of the local authorities in Ghana, as she became the first woman to hold the position.

Upon assuming the position, she rolled out the "Right Way to Together" plan, which aimed at restoring Tema to its original master plan as a modern industrial center.
