= Madina (Ghana parliament constituency) =

Ghana parliament constituency

- constituency for the Parliament of Ghana
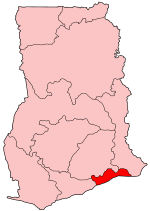
- District: Ga East District
- Region: Greater Accra Region of Ghana

Current constituency
- Created: 2012
- Party: National Democratic Congress
- MP: Hon. Francis-Xavier Kojo Sosu

Madina is one of the constituencies represented in the Parliament of Ghana. It elects one Member of Parliament (MP) by the first past the post system of election. Madina is located in the Accra Metropolitan Area of the Greater Accra Region of Ghana.

== Members of Parliament ==
Election	Member	Party
2016	Abubakar Boniface Siddique	New Patriotic Party
2021	Francis-Xavier Kojo Sosu	National Democratic Congress
