= Adina, Ghana =

Fishing community in Volta Region, Ghana

Adina
- Town
- Location of Adina, Ghana in Volta Region
- Coordinates: 06°2′1.7″N 01°4′1,2″E 6°2'1.7"N, 1°4'1.2"E
- Country: Ghana
- Region: Volta Region
- District: Ketu South Municipality

Population (2010)
  - Total: 3,291
- Time zone: UTC0 (GMT)

Adina is a fishing and a coastal community in the Ketu South Municipality in the Volta Region of Ghana. The town is known for the production of salt.

== History ==
As at 2014, the Royal Gbenyo Stool Father of Adina is Togbe Seth Abotsi.

In 2016, the Adina Sea Defence Project was awarded to Amandi Holdings for the construction of a 42 km sea defense.

== Institutions ==
Institutions located in Adina:

- Seven Seas Salt (SSS) Limited, a salt mining company.
- Kensington Industries Limited, an Indian salt mining company. others also claimed it is a British salt company.

== Notable natives ==
- Elikplim Akurugu, a Ghanaian politician
