= Squatting in Ghana =

Ghana on the globe

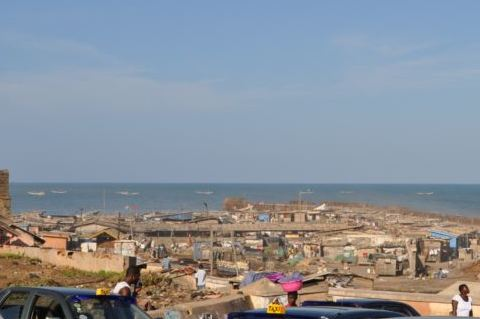
Seafront shanty town in Accra

Squatting in Ghana is the occupation of unused land or derelict buildings without the permission of the owner. Informal settlements are found in cities such as Kumasi and the capital Accra. Ashaiman, now a town of 100,000 people, was swelled by squatters. In central Accra, next to Agbogbloshie, the Old Fadama settlement houses an estimated 80,000 people and is subject to a controversial discussion about eviction. The residents have been supported by Amnesty International, the Centre on Housing Rights and Evictions and Shack Dwellers International.

== History ==
In Ghana, following British colonialism squatting occurred at a lower rate than in other countries both because of strong tribal control of land and because it is viewed in a negative light as it violates traditional views on indigenous property rights. A rare example of squatting in the 1960s is Ashaiman, which was expanded by workers building the new city of Tema and is now a town of 100,000 people. Another example is Adiembra at Kumasi.

More recently, the poor are generally excluded from housing and employment opportunities, so they squat land on the edge of cities to live on and also occupy pavements and public areas in order to sell goods as hawkers. The authorities frequently evict informal settlements; for example in the 2000s, 7,000 people were forcibly removed from beside Lake Volta in Digya National Park and the army evicted 800 people from Legion Village.

In the capital Accra, in 2018 a shanty town was evicted to make way for the Marine Drive Project and the following year hundreds of squatters were evicted by the Ablekuma West Municipal Assembly (AWMA).

== Old Fadama ==
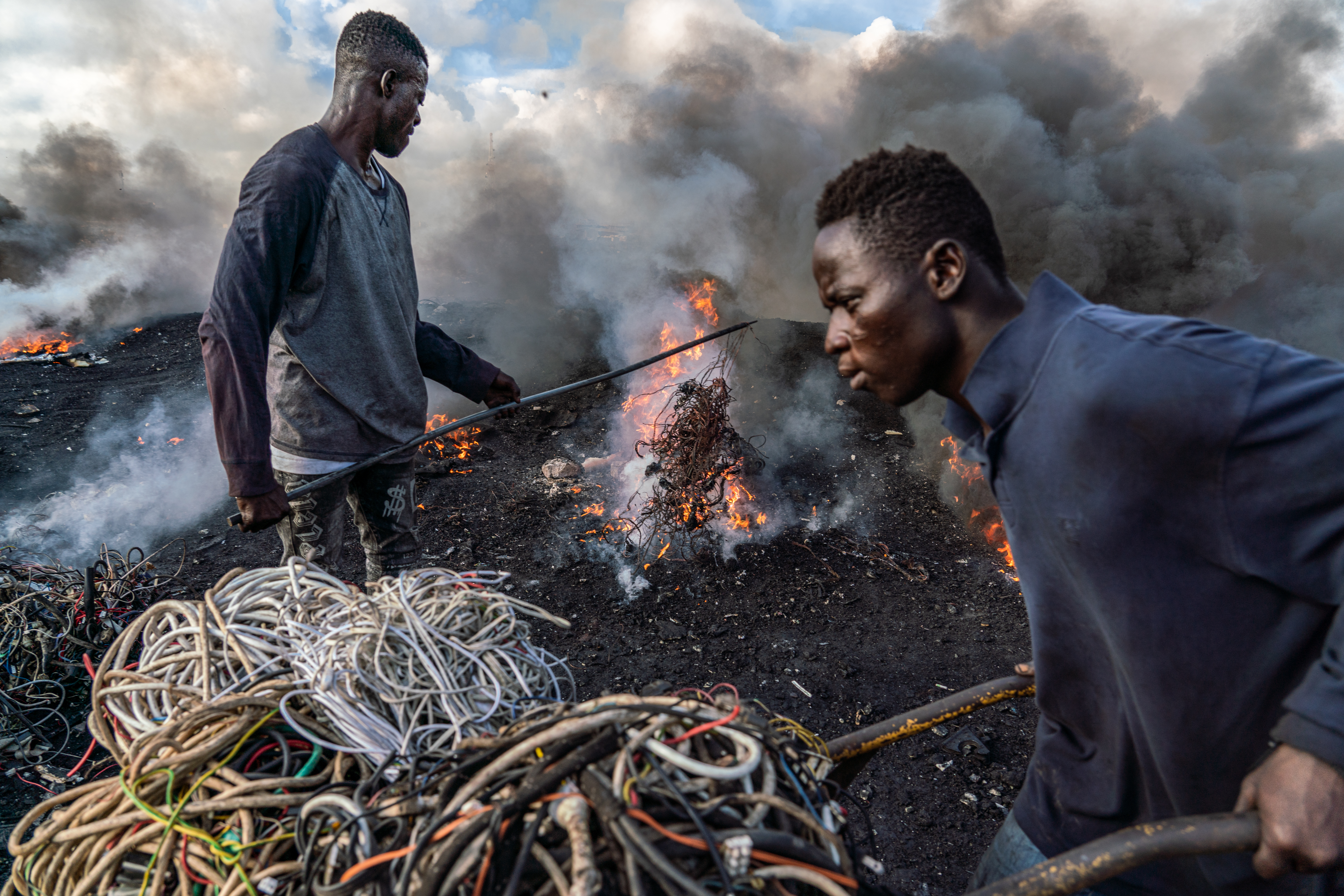
A man burning wires to recover copper at Agbogbloshie

In informal settlements such as Old Fadama next to Agbogbloshie in central Accra, an informal economy has developed in which squatter landlords rent out places to live. The Accra Metropolitan Assembly (AMA) decided in the early 2010s to evict Old Fadama, where an estimated 80,000 people were living. The site of 31.3 hectares had grown as a settlement from the 1990s onwards, housing both Ghanaian migrants fleeing conflict in the north and middle-class residents of Accra who lost their houses elsewhere. The settlement is mainly constructed of shacks without sanitation, and flooding from the nearby Odaw river occurs frequently.

The proposed eviction became a controversial issue, with the AMA wanting to redevelop the land next to the Korle Lagoon without supplying alternative accommodation for the squatters. It justified its position by referring to the illegality of the occupation and the health risks of the current site. The Centre on Housing Rights and Evictions (COHRE) produced a report showing that it would be possible to work on the lagoon and upgrade the settlement without the residents having to move. The Ghana Federation of the Urban Poor also backed the inhabitants and in co-operation with Shack Dwellers International set up a local savings scheme, which was successful and had spread to 82 other settlements by 2005. In 2009, conflict in Old Fadama between representatives of various political parties led to the new mayor restarting the eviction process. After COHRE and Amnesty International intervened, the plans were again dropped.

== See also ==
- List of slums in Ghana
