= Bryt TV =

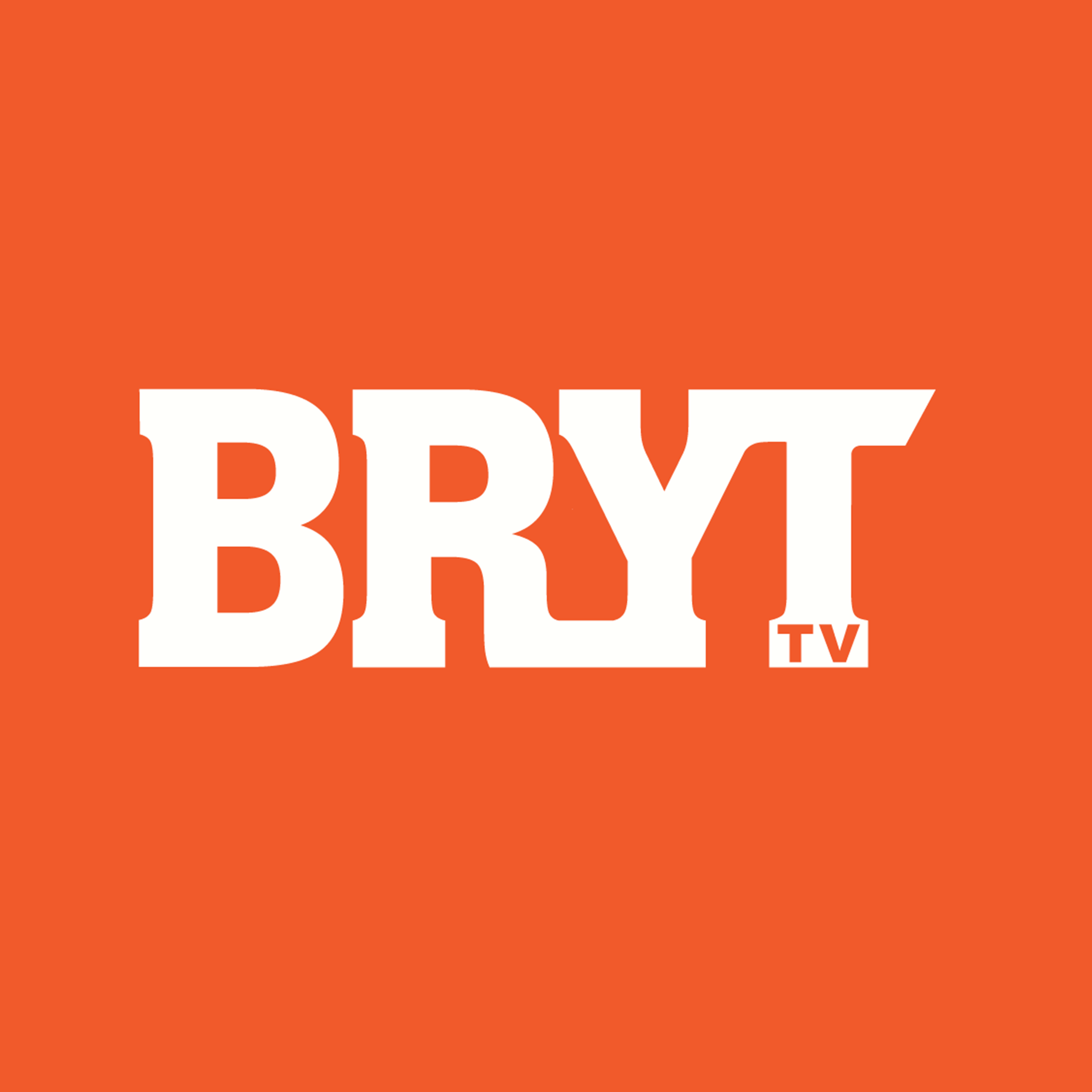
- Country: Ghana
- Broadcast area: Ghana
- Network: Bryt TV
- Headquarters: Taifa, Accra Ghana

Ownership
- Owner: Joy Daddy Multimedia
- Sister channels: Bryt FM, Dadi FM

History
- Launched: 2018

Links
- Website: http://www.mybryttvonline.com/

Bryt TV is a private, free-to-air television broadcaster in Ghana launched in 2018 by the Joy Daddy Multimedia headed by Dr. Manfred Takyi and Dr. Harrison Tetteh. Bryt TV airs and produces a variety of television programs including Bryt Extra, Daily Extra, Bryt TV Top 10, Out And About, Selfie Jam, Bryt TV Premiere, Yen Sere, and Yendi Dwa respectively. It currently has Ghanaian veteran actor Koo Fori as its managing director.

== Programs ==
- Bryt Extra
- Daily Extra
- Bryt TV Top 10
- Out And About
- Selfie Jam
- Bryt TV Music Premiere
- Yen Sere
- Yendi Dwa
- Bryt Top 10 Count Down

== Events ==
- Suhum Odwira Jam
- Ayeeko Live Band Performance With Dadi's Band
- Mothers’ Day with Luminary DMR
- Aboakyire Beach Rave
- Vandal Ubant,
- Ejisu Sokoo Concert
- Wob3ti - Akple Za
- Wob3ti Joseph Hill Memorial Concert
- Eastern Business Trade

== See also ==
- Media of Ghana
