= Haatso =

- town
- Location within Ghana
- Coordinates: 5°39′56″N 0°12′07″W
- Country: Ghana
- Region: Greater Accra Region
- District: Ga East Municipal
- Elevation: 190 ft (58 m)
- Time zone: GMT
  - Summer (DST): GMT

Haatso is a residential town located in the Ga East Municipal District, a district in the Greater Accra Region of Ghana. It serves as a major suburban hub north of central Accra and houses private tertiary institutions including Academic City University.

== Village structure ==
The town is under the jurisdiction of the Ga East Municipal District and is in the Dome-Kwabenya constituency of the Ghana parliament.

== Education ==
Haatso contains a diverse mix of public and private basic, secondary, and tertiary educational institutions. Notably, it is home to the permanent, purpose-built campus of Academic City University, a private institution focused on science, technology, engineering, arts, and mathematics (STEAM fields) that was granted a Presidential Charter in 2024.
