= Peduase =

- Town
- Location within Ghana
- Coordinates: 5°51′N 0°11′W
- Country: Ghana
- Region: Eastern Region
- District: Akuapim South Municipal

Population
  - Total: 18,701
- Time zone: GMT
  - Summer (DST): GMT

Peduase is a town in the Akuapim South Municipal District of the Eastern Region of south Ghana and known for the Peduase Lodge. It shares borders with Ayi Mensa which is one of the entry points from Accra to Akuapem.

== Peduase Lodge ==
Peduase is the location of a Presidential summer residence ('Peduase Lodge') built and first used by Ghana's first President, Kwame Nkrumah. It was used in the second republic of Ghana as the official residence of the then Ceremonial President, Edward Akufo-Addo. Since then it has not been permanently resided in by any Ghanaian head-of-state.

Peduase Lodge is still used as a Presidential accommodation for the state of Ghana guests. The Presidential Lodge is in Peduase, a town near Kitase on the road to Aburi.

== Notable places ==
- Peduase Logde
- Peduase valley resort
