= Adenta East =

- Town
- Location in Ghana
- Coordinates: 5°43′28″N 0°9′48″W
- Country: Ghana
- Region: Greater Accra Region
- District: Adenta Municipal District

Population (2012)
  - Total: 44,194
- Ranked 39th in Ghana
- Time zone: GMT
  - Summer (DST): GMT

Adenta East is a town in Adenta District in the Greater Accra Region of southeastern Ghana, and north of Madina. Adenta East is the thirty-ninth most populous settlement in Ghana, in terms of population, with a population of 44,194 people. At the Ghana census of 26 March 2000, the population was 31,070 inhabitants living in the town. Projections of 1 January 2007 estimated a population of 39,730 inhabitants.

== See also ==
- Railway stations in Ghana
