= Ayi Mensa =

- Location within Ghana
- Coordinates: 5°47′N 0°11′W
- Country: Ghana
- Region: Greater Accra Region
- District: Ga East Municipal
- Elevation: 413 ft (126 m)
- Time zone: GMT
  - Summer (DST): GMT

Ayi Mensa is a village in the Ga East Municipal district, a district in the Greater Accra Region of Ghana.

== Village structure ==
The village is under the jurisdiction of the Ga East Municipal District and is in the Abokobi-Madina constituency of the Ghana parliament.
