= Amadu Bukari Sorogho =

Ghanaian politician

Hon. Amadu Bukari Sorogho

Member of the Ghana Parliament for Abokobi-Madina Constituency
- In office 7 January 2005 – 6 January 2013
- Preceded by: New
- Succeeded by: Constituency split

Member of the Ghana Parliament for Madina Constituency
- In office 7 January 2013 – 6 January 2017
- Preceded by: Constituency split
- Succeeded by: Saddique Boniface Abu-Bakar

Personal details
- Born: 5 May 1955 (age 71) Ghana
- Party: National Democratic Congress
- Education: University of Ghana; Ghana Institute of Management and Public Administration; World Bank Institute
- Occupation: Politician

Amadu Bukari Sorogho is a Ghanaian politician. He was the member of parliament for the Abokobi-Madina Constituency from 7 January 2005 to 6 January 2013. From 7 January 2013 to 6 January 2017, he was the member of parliament for the Madina Constituency.

== Early life and education ==
Sorogho was born on 5 May 1955. He hails from Bawku, in the Upper East Region of Ghana. He obtained his bachelor of arts in political science from the University of Ghana in 1981 and later proceeded to the Ghana Institute of Management and Public Administration (GIMPA) for his post graduate studies graduating in 1993. He received a certificate in Trade and Finance from the World Bank Institute, Washington in 2009.

== Career ==
Sorogho is a Human Resource Manager and Public Relations Consultant by profession. Prior to entering politics, he was the Human Resource and Public Relations Consultant Manager for Desimone Group Of Companies Limited in Accra.

== Politics ==
Sorogho entered parliament on 7 January 2005 on the ticket of the National Democratic Congress (NDC) representing the Abokobi-Madina Constituency. He represented the constituency from 2005 until 2012 when the constituency was split. From 7 January 2013 until 6 January 2017 he was the member of parliament for the Madina Constituency. He contested for the seat for a second consecutive term but lost to Saddique Boniface Abu-Bakar of the New Patriotic Party during the 2016 Ghanaian general election. In 2018 he contested for the post of National Vice Chairman of the NDC but lost to Said Sinare.

== Personal life ==
Sorogho is married with six children. He identifies as a Muslim.
