= Domeabra =

- Town
- Location within Ghana
- Coordinates: 7°3′N 1°56′W
- Country: Ghana
- Region: Brong-Ahafo Region
- District: Asutifi District
- Elevation: 1,027 ft (313 m)
- Time zone: GMT
  - Summer (DST): GMT

Nsiakrom-(Domeabra) is a small town in the Prestea-Huni Valley Municipal District, a district in the Western Region of Ghana.

== Education ==
Domeabra is known as the DOMEABRA M/A BASIC School.

== Healthcare ==
The Saint John of God Hospital is located in Domeabra.

== See also ==
- Prestea-Huni Valley Municipal District
