= Dome, Ghana =

Dome
- Town
- Location in Ghana
- Coordinates: 5.655°N 0.235°W
- Country: Ghana
- Region: Greater Accra Region
- District: Ga East Municipal District

Population (2012)
  - Total: 78,785
- Ranked 20th in Ghana
- Time zone: GMT
  - Summer (DST): GMT

Dome (pronounced Dor-mi) is a town in the Ga East Municipal District, a district in the Greater Accra Region of Ghana. As of 2012, Dome was the nineteenth largest settlement in Ghana, in terms of population, with a population of 78,785 people. In 2026, the population of this district is estimated to be 108,677.
