= La Nkwantanang Madina Municipal Assembly =

La-Nkwantanang-Madina Municipal Assembly
- Municipal Municipal
- Municipalities of Greater Accra Region

- Location of La-Nkwantanang-Madina Municipal Assembly within Greater Accra
- Coordinates: 5°40′40″N 0°10′1″W
- Country: Ghana
- Region: Greater Accra
- Capital: Madina

Area
  - Total: 70.887 km^{2} (27.370 sq mi)

Population (2021)
  - Total: 244,676
- Time zone: UTC+0 (GMT)
- ISO 3166 code: GH-AA-LM

La Nkwantanang Madina Municipal District is one of the twenty-nine districts in Greater Accra Region, Ghana. Originally it was formerly part of the then-larger Ga East District in 2004, until the eastern part of the district was split off to create La-Nkwantanang-Madina Municipal Assembly on 28 June 2012, which was established by Legislative Instrument (L.I.) 2131; thus the remaining part has been retained as Ga East Municipal Assembly. The municipality is located in the western part of Greater Accra Region and has Madina as its capital town.

== Geography ==
The district is bordered to the north by Akuapim South District (in the Eastern Region), to the east by Kpone Katamanso Municipal District and Adenta Municipal District, to the south by the Accra Metropolis District, and to the west by Ga East Municipal Assembly. The total area of the district is 70.887 square kilometers.

== Population ==
According to the 2021 population census, the population of the district is 244,676.
