= Taifa, Morocco =

Taifa
- commune
- Location within Morocco
- Country: Morocco
- Region: Taza-Al Hoceima-Taounate
- Province: Taza

Population (2004)
  - Total: 8,808
- Time zone: UTC+0 (GMT)

Taifa is a commune in the Taza Province of the Taza-Al Hoceima-Taounate administrative region of Morocco. At the time of the 2004 census, the commune had a total population of 8,808 people living in 1,468 households.
