= Francis Apangabuno Achibonga =

Ghanaian judge

Francis Apangabuno Achibonga is a Ghanaian High Court and Court of Appeal judge. He was sworn in by John Mahama as a justice of the Court of Appeal along with 20 others.

== Biography ==
In 2025, he was at the Adenta High Court.

In 2026, in the trial of Director-general Kwabena Adu-Boahene, a former National Security Bureau, he replaced John Eugene Nyante Nyadu as the presiding judge. He is currently at the Accra High Court.
