= NET 2 Television =

Television broadcaster in Accra, Ghana

Net 2 Television is a private, free-to-air television broadcaster in Accra, Ghana.
