= Ga East Municipal Assembly =

- Municipal Assembly
- Districts of Greater Accra Region

- Location of Ga East Municipal Assembly within Greater Accra
- Coordinates: 5°44′17″N 0°11′42″W
- Country: Ghana
- Region: Greater Accra
- Capital: Abokobi

Government
  - Municipal Chief Executive: Hon. Janet Tulasi Mensah
  - Succeeded: Hon. John Kwao Sackey

Population (2021)
  - Total: 283,379
- Time zone: UTC+0 (GMT)
- ISO 3166 code: GH-AA-GE

Ga East Municipal Assembly is one of the twenty-nine districts in Greater Accra Region, Ghana. Originally it was formerly part of the then-larger Ga District in 1988, until the eastern part of the district was split off to create Ga East District in 2004; thus the remaining part has been renamed as Ga West District. It was later elevated to municipal district assembly status on 29 February 2008 to become Ga East Municipal District, until the eastern part of the district was split off to create La-Nkwantanang-Madina Municipal District on 28 June 2012; thus the remaining part has been retained as Ga East Municipal District. The municipality is located in the western part of Greater Accra Region and has Abokobi as its capital town.

== Population ==
The 2021 population based Ghana Statistical Service record is 283,379.

== Geography ==
Ga East Municipal Assembly is bordered on the north by the Akuapim South District in the Eastern Region of Ghana. It is bordered on its other three sides by other districts in the Greater Accra Region of Ghana. To the west is the Ga West Municipal Assembly, to the south Accra Metropolitan Assembly and in the east the Tema Metropolitan Assembly.

== Settlements ==
The towns in the district include: Abokobi the capital, Dome, Madina, Taifa, and the villages in the district include: Ashongman, Boi, Ayi Mensa, Bansa, Haatso, Kwabenya, Oyarifa and Pantang.

Abokobi is an important town historically as Presbyterian missionaries set up a mission here. It is still an important centre for the Presbyterian Church of Ghana. Madina is the biggest market town in the district. Kwabenya is the location of the Ghana Atomic Energy Commission.

== Health ==
There is a large psychiatry hospital at Pantang, which includes a psychiatry nursing training school.

== Sources ==
- "Districts of Ghana". Statoids.
- GhanaDistricts.com
