= Kwasi Kyei Darwkah =

Ghanaian presenter

Kwasi Kyei Darkwah
- Born: 9 December 1966; Accra, Ghana
- Other name: KKD the Finest also known as His Royal Blackness also known as The Master Communicator
- Occupations: Broadcaster, Chief Executive Officer, The Finest Productions
- Spouse: Lydia Akosua Ohenewaa Kyei-Darkwah née Bampoe (divorced since 2002)
- Children: Kwaku Darkwah Kyei-Darkwah, Ohemaa Asokwa Kyei-Darkwah
- Family: Father: Opanin Kwasi Darkwah of Adanse Dompoase Mother: Ohemaa Ama Asokwa Kyei Darkwah of Adanse Akrokyere & Abadwum

Kwasi Kyei Darkwah popularly known as KKD (born 19 December 1965, is a Ghanaian broadcaster, Master of Ceremonies, media, culture and tourism expert.

== Early life ==
KKD was born on 19 December 1965 in Tema to Opanin Kwasi Darkwah and Ohemaa Ama Asokwa Kyei Darkwah of royal lineage.

=== Education ===
Darkwah holds a Master of Arts Degree in Audio-Visual Production (Film & Television) from London Metropolitan University, a Diploma in Journalism from Ghana Institute of Journalism, a Certificate in Marketing Management from Ghana Institute of Management and Public Administration, a Certificate in Production and Cost Management from the Association of Overseas Technical Scholarship of Japan, a Certificate in Marketing Management from Ghana Institute of Management and Public Administration, and a Certificate in Delivering Learning to Adults from [Westminster Adult Education Service, London. He had his second cycle education at Ghana's prestigious second cycle institution, Presbyterian Boys' Secondary School - Legon (PRESEC), Accra.

== Career ==
KKD started as a broadcast journalist at the Ghana Broadcasting Corporation. He has held positions including Director of Public Communications at the Ghana Investment Promotion Council, Director of Programmes & Marketing at Sunshine Radio, General Manager of record company Megastar Limited, Account Manager for Corporate Healthcare at Gissings Consultancy Services in London. He also was Advertising & Promotions Manager at ABC Brewery Ltd.

== Rape charge ==
He was arrested on 27 December 2014 following a report accusing him of raping a 19-year-old woman in the bathroom of the African Regent Hotel in Accra, Ghana. He was formally charged with rape.

On 12 January 2015, the 19-year-old alleged victim expressed her disinterest in pursuing the case. Darwkah was freed and the rape charge against him was dropped on 22 April 2015 after the Attorney General entered a nolle prosequi for the case.

== See also ==
- Kojo Antwi
- Kofi Okyere Darko
