= Adenta Municipal Assembly =

Adentan Municipal Assembly
- District
- Districts of Greater Accra Region

- Location of Adenta Municipal Assembly within Greater Accra
- Coordinates: 5°42′25″N 0°10′15″W
- Country: Ghana
- Region: Greater Accra
- Capital: Adenta East

Government
  - Municipal Chief Executive: HON. CHRISTINE ELLA ESINAM NONGO

Area
  - Total: 92.84 km^{2} (35.85 sq mi)

Population (2021)
  - Total: 237,546
- Time zone: UTC+0 (GMT)
- ISO 3166 code: GH-AA-__

Adenta Municipal Assembly is one of the twenty-nine districts in Greater Accra Region, Ghana. Originally it was formerly part of the then-larger Tema Municipal District, which was created from the former Tema District Council, until two parts of the district were later split off to create Adenta Municipal District (from the northwest part) and Ashaiman Municipal District (from the north central part) respectively on 29 February 2008; thus the remaining part was elevated to metropolitan district assembly status on that same year to become Tema Metropolitan Assembly. The municipality is located in the central part of Greater Accra Region and has Adenta East as its capital town.

== Geography ==
The district is bordered to the north by La Nkwantanang Madina Municipal Assembly, to the east by Kpone Katamanso Municipal District and Tema Metropolitan District, to the south by Ledzokuku Municipal District and Krowor Municipal District, and to the west by Accra Metropolis District.

== Population ==
The total area of the district is 92.84 square kilometers. The current population according to 2021 population census is 237,546

== Demographics, weather, land use, investments ==
Land area	Arable area 50sq miles; Cultivable area- 5sq miles
Temperatures	28C – 32C; Hottest Months-November-March; Coldest month- July- August
Rainfall	762.5 millimeters-1220 millimeters; Major season: April – JulyMinor season: September – November
Crop production	About 30% of labour force is engaged in crop farming, fishing, processing, livestock and agro-forestry
Major Crops	Onion, pepper, tomatoes, okra, leafy vegetables, maize, plantain, legumes, watermelon mushroom and vegetable.
Livestock production	About 80 farmers are involved in producing Grasscutter. The average holding is about 10 but some farmers have as high as 300 animals. Most of these farmers are assisted technically by MOFA staff. CSIR staffs also assist by providing research information to assist farmers.; The total number of sheep and goats in the municipality is currently 2013 and 4437 respectively.; A few dozen of farmers are involved in dairy production. Some of these farmers practice zero grazing where the animals are kept completely in-house and their nutritional and other requirements provided by the farmers. The challenge is feeding during the dry season where farmers need to travel long distances to get fodder for the animals. A few kraals are still located within the Municipality. This poses a lot of problems to the owners since most of them have a very big challenge in feeding their animals.

== Sources ==
- "Districts of Ghana". Statoids.
- GhanaDistricts.com
