= Salaga (Ghana parliament constituency) =

Constituency in Ghana

- constituency for the Parliament of Ghana
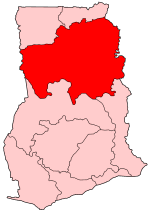
- District: East Gonja District
- Region: Northern Region of Ghana

Current constituency
- Party: National Democratic Congress
- MP: Ibrahim Bey Abubakari

Salaga is one of the constituencies represented in the Parliament of Ghana. It elects one Member of Parliament (MP) by the first past the post system of election. It is located in the Northern Region of Ghana. The current member of Parliament for the constituency is Ibrahim Bey Abubakari. He was elected on the ticket of the National Democratic Congress (NDC) and won a majority of 3,046 votes more than the candidate closest in the race, to win the constituency election to become the MP. He succeeded Boniface Abubakar Saddique who had represented the constituency in the 4th Republican parliament on the ticket of the New Patriotic Party (NPP). .

== See also ==
- List of Ghana Parliament constituencies
