= Labadi Beach =

Beach in Labadi, Ghana

Coordinates: 5°33′44″N 0°8′22″E

- Beach
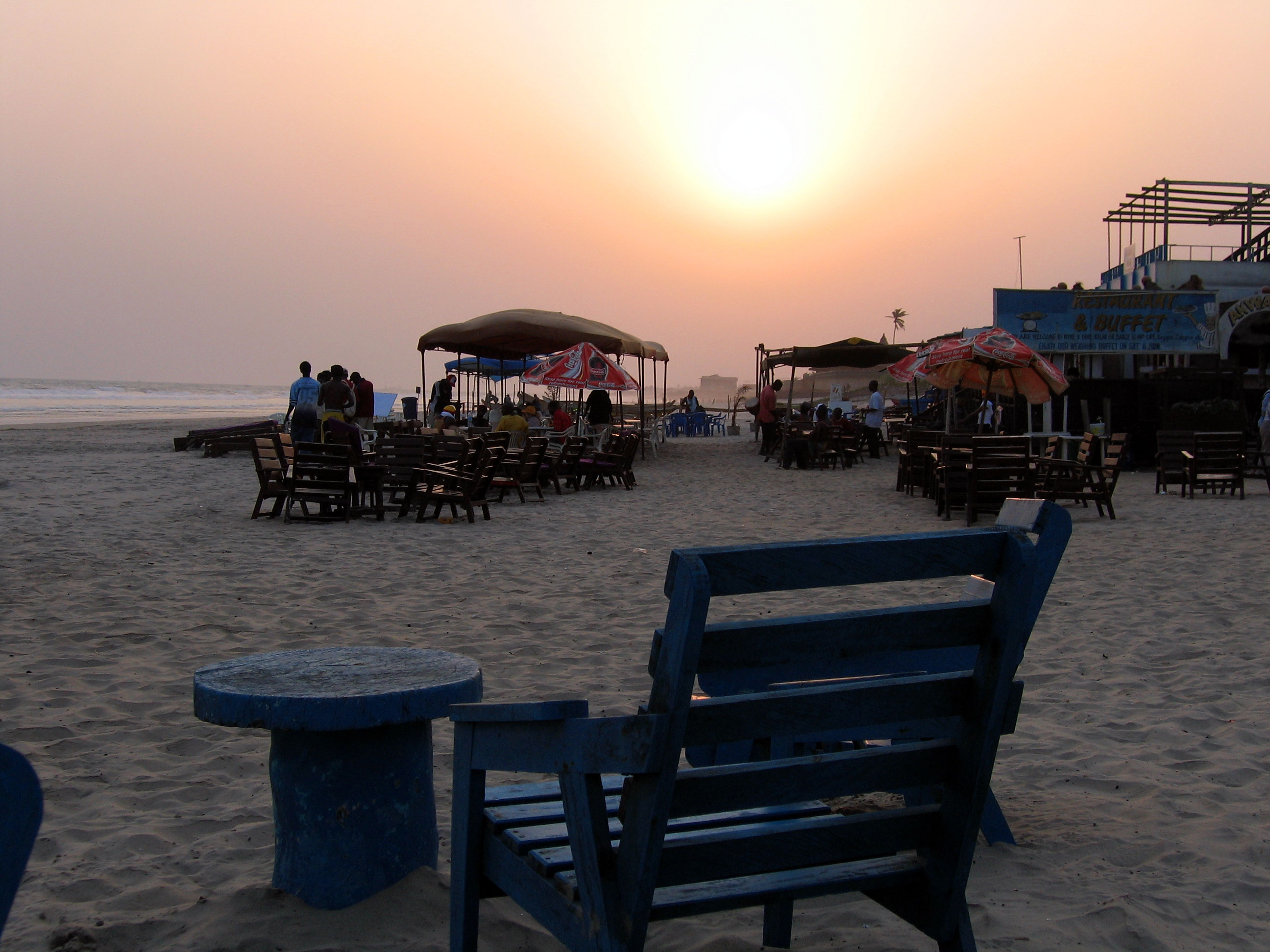
- Labadi Beach as seen in the daylight (left image)

- Location within Ghana
- Coordinates
- Location: Labadi, Accra, Ghana

Labadi Beach or more properly known as La Pleasure Beach is the busiest beach on Ghana's coast. It is one of Accra's beaches and is maintained by the local hotels. Labadi Beach is in a town called La, popularly known as Labadi, near Teshie in the Greater Accra Region of Ghana. An entrance fee to those not staying in the hotels is charged. On holidays and weekends there are often performances of reggae, hiplife, playback, and cultural drumming and dancing. Aside from visiting the beach to have fun, people visit the place early morning to work out, mostly on weekends.
