= Abubakar Boniface Siddique =

Ghanaian politician

Hon. Abubakar Boniface Siddique

Member of Parliament for Salaga constituency
- In office 7 January 2005 – 6 January 2009
- Preceded by: Hamidu Baba Braimah
- Succeeded by: Ibrahim Dey Abubakari
- President: John Kufuor

Personal details
- Born: 14 November 1960 (age 65)
- Party: New Patriotic Party
- Education: Kwame Nkrumah University of Science and Technology
- Profession: Economist, Civil Servant

Abu-Bakar Siddique Boniface (also: Abubakar Saddique Boniface) (born November 14, 1960) is a Ghanaian politician and currently Minister of State at the Office of the Vice President and a former minister for Inner cities and Zongo Development. He was a Minister of Youth, Labour, and Employment (Manpower, Youth and Employment) between 2005 and July 2007. In August 2007, Boniface joined the Ministry of Water Resources, Public Works and Housing as a government minister.

== Politics ==
Abu-Bakar Saddique Boniface from New Patriotic Party, is a member of the 4th parliament of the 4th republic of Ghana elected in 2004 Ghanaian general election for the salaga constituency and also a member of the 3rd parliament of the 4th parliament elected in 2000 Ghanaian general election with a majority of 1821 votes. He took the seat from Hamidu Baba Braimah of National Democratic Congress at this time he was an Independent. During his political duty, Alhaji Abubakar Saddique Boniface has promised to discharge his duty - as a Minister of State with diligence and treat all Zongo dwellers with fairly despite their religious, ethnic and social differences.

== Education ==
Abu-Bakar Saddique Boniface schooled at the University of Exeter where he obtained his master of Arts in Economics and after went to the Kwame Nkrumah University of Science and Technology. Abu-Bakar Saddique Boniface is an Economist and a Civil Servant.

== Career ==
Abu-Bakar Saddique Boniface is an Economist and a Civil Servant.

== Publications, ==
- Rural Housing Problems in Ghana (A case study of Kpandai)
- The Role of Foreign Aid in Structural Adjustment Programme (Ghana as case study)
- A Review of UK Retail Banking Industry and Performance Evaluation of Three Retail Banks

== Family ==
Boniface is a Muslim, married with 5 children.
