= Taifa, Accra =

Taifa
- Town
- Location in Ghana
- Coordinates: 5°39′58″N 0°15′8″W
- Country: Ghana
- Region: Greater Accra Region
- District: Ga East Municipal District

Population (2012)
  - Total: 68,459
- Ranked 26th in Ghana
- Time zone: GMT
  - Summer (DST): GMT

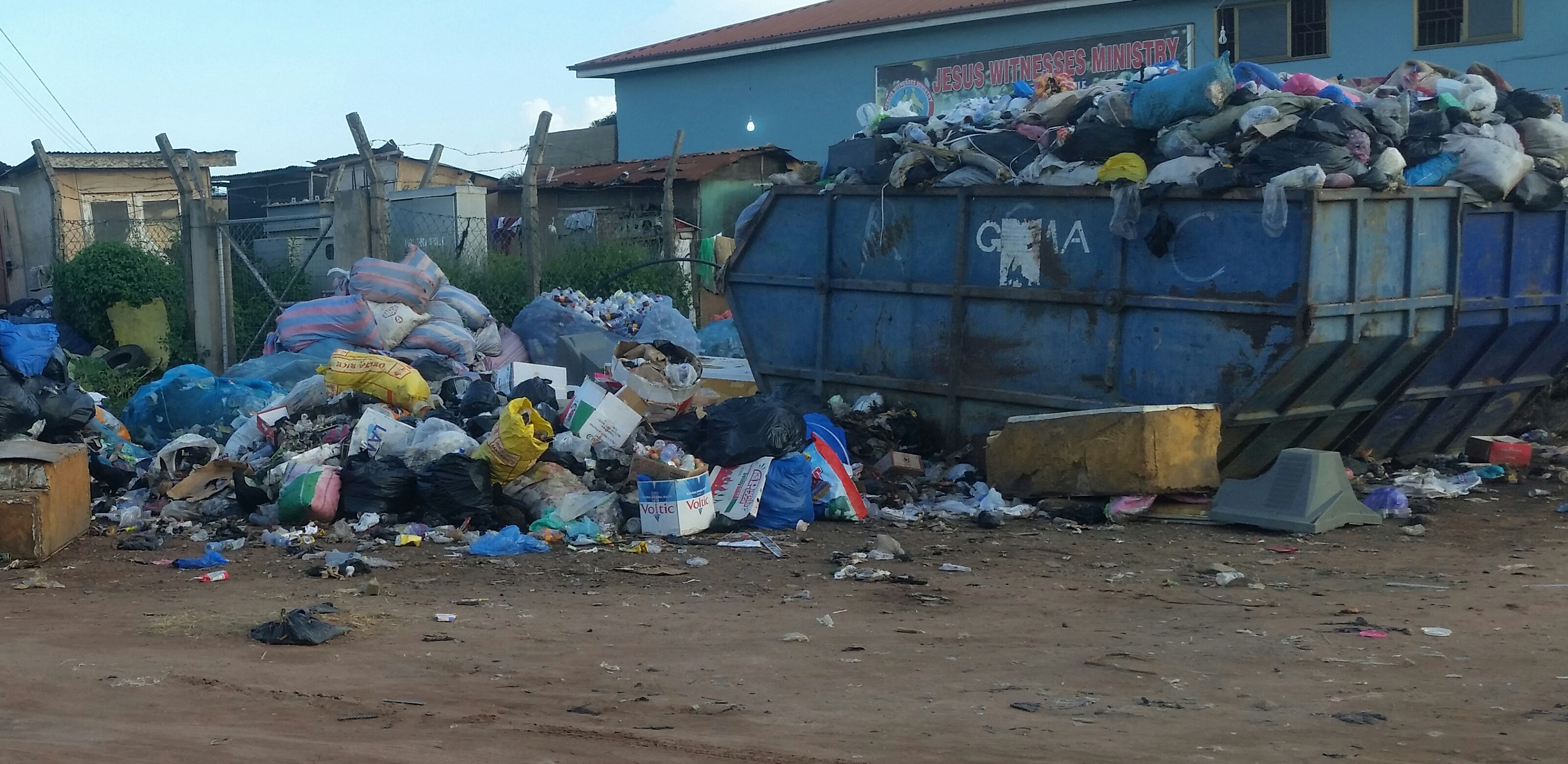
Problems with trash collection in Tifa

Taifa is a town in the Ga East Municipal District, a district in the Greater Accra Region of south-eastern Ghana near the capital Accra. Taifa is the twenty-sixth largest settlement in Ghana, in terms of population, with a population of 68,459 people. Taifa is located in the northwest suburbs area of Accra. It has a breakpoint on a railway line and a small park located on the northern edge of the location of the Taifa Ghana Atomic Energy Commission. At the Ghana 2000 census of 26 March 2000, the population was 26,145 inhabitants living in the city. Projections of 1 January 2007 estimated the population to be 48,927 inhabitants. In the census of 1984 there was only 1,009 inhabitants. The strong population growth of the Town is influenced by, among other things, many illegal immigrants from west African countries who move to towns and villages near the industrial town of Tema to find a job.

Additionally, one of the challenges faced by Taifa is the poor condition of its roads, which remain untarred and in a state of disrepair. Unfortunately, despite the evident issue, the government has not taken sufficient action to address this problem, leaving the community to contend with inadequate infrastructure.

== Town structure ==
The town in under the jurisdiction of the Ga East Municipal District and is in the Dome-Kwabenya constituency) of the Ghana parliament.

== See also ==
- Railway stations in Ghana
