= Lashibi =

Town in Greater Accra Region, Ghana

- Town
- Location in Ghana
- Coordinates: 5°41′4″N 0°2′17″W
- Country: Ghana
- Region: Greater Accra Region

Population (2012)
  - Total: 78,539
- Ranked 21st in Ghana
- Time zone: GMT
  - Summer (DST): GMT

Lashibi is a town in the Greater Accra Region of southeastern Ghana, near the capital Accra. Lashibi is the twenty-first-largest settlement in Ghana, in terms of population, with a population of 78,539 people.

== See also ==
- Railway stations in Ghana
