= Mike Oquaye Jnr =

Ghanaian politician and diplomat

His Excellency Mike Oquaye Jnr

CEO of Ghana Free Zones Authority
- Incumbent
- Assumed office July 2021
- President: Nana Akuffo-Addo

Personal details
- Born: Ghana
- Party: New Patriotic Party
- Education: Association International School, Airport, Accra; Presec, Legon.

Mike Oquaye Jnr is a Ghanaian politician and diplomat. He is a member of the New Patriotic Party of Ghana. He is currently Ghana's High Commissioner to India.

== Diplomatic appointment ==
In July 2021, President Nana Akuffo-Addo named Mike Oquaye Jnr as the CEO of Ghana Free Zones Authority. He was among twenty two other distinguished Ghanaians who were named to head various diplomatic Ghanaian missions in the world.
