= Kpone Katamanso Municipal Assembly =

District in Greater Accra region, Ghana

Kpone-Katamanso Municipal Assembly
- Municipal
- Municipal districts of Greater Accra Region

- Location of Kpone-Katamanso Municipal Assembly within Greater Accra
- Coordinates: 5°41′23″N 0°3′25″E
- Country: Ghana
- Region: Greater Accra
- Capital: Kpone

Area
  - Total: 208 km^{2} (80 sq mi)

Population (2021)
  - Total: 417,334
  - Density: 2,010/km^{2} (5,200/sq mi)
- Time zone: UTC+0 (GMT)
- ISO 3166 code: GH-AA-KP

Kpone-Katamanso Municipal District is one of the twenty-nine districts in Greater Accra Region, Ghana. Originally it was part of the then-larger Tema Municipal District, which was created from the former Tema District Council, until the eastern portion of the district was split off to create Kpone-Katamanso District on 28 June 2012, which was established by Legislative Instrument (L.I.) 2031; thus the remaining part has been retained as Tema Metropolitan Assembly. However on 15 March 2018, it was later elevated to municipal district assembly status to become Kpone-Katamanso Municipal District, which was established by Legislative Instrument (L.I.) 2271. The municipality is located in the central part of Greater Accra Region and has Kpone as its capital town.

In November 2024, the status of the Kpone Katamanso Municipal Assembly was elevated to a metropolitan assembly. It is now Kpone Katamanso Metropolitan Assembly.

== Administration ==
Kpone Katamanso Municipal Assembly, as of 14 March 2018, is headed by Hon. Solomon Appiah elected by the President, H.E Nana Akufo-Addo as the Municipal Chief Executive (DCE). He succeeds Hon. Alhaji Antiaye Tetteh who was the first Chief Executive of the Assembly under the presidency of H.E. John Dramani Mahama.

== Geography ==
The district is bordered to the north by Akuapim North Municipal District and Akuapim South District (both in the Eastern Region), to the east by Shai Osudoku District and Ningo Prampram District, to the south by the Gulf of Guinea, and to the west by Tema Metropolis District, Ashaiman Municipal District, Adenta Municipal District and La Nkwantanang Madina Municipal District.

According to the 2021 census, the population of the district was 417,334 with 208,040 males and 209,294 females.

The district is the home of several industries that generates revenue for the country, including Tema Oil Refinery, Olams Ghana and TT Brothers Limited.
