= Ashaiman Municipal District =

- District
- Districts of Greater Accra Region

- Location of Ashaiman Municipal District within Greater Accra
- Coordinates: 5°41′35.16″N 0°1′57.72″W
- Country: Ghana
- Region: Greater Accra
- Capital: Ashaiman

Government
  - Municipal Chief Executive: Hon. Ibrahim Baidoo

Area
  - Total: 17 km^{2} (6.6 sq mi)

Population (2021)
  - Total: 208,060
  - Density: 12,000/km^{2} (32,000/sq mi)
- Time zone: UTC+0 (GMT)
- ISO 3166 code: GH-AA-__

Ashaiman Municipal District is one of the twenty-nine districts in Greater Accra Region, Ghana. Originally it was formerly part of the then-larger Tema Municipal District, which was created from the former Tema District Council, until two parts of the district were later split off to create Adenta Municipal District (from the northwest part) and Ashaiman Municipal District (from the north central part) respectively on 29 February 2008; thus the remaining part was elevated to metropolitan district assembly status on that same year to become Tema Metropolitan District. The municipality is located in the central part of Greater Accra Region and has Ashaiman as its capital town.

== Economic activities ==
Retail business

scrap business

== Geography ==
The district is bordered to the north by Kpone Katamanso District and to the south by Tema Metropolis District. The total area of the district is 45 square kilometers.

== Population ==
According to the 2010 census, the population of the district is 190,972, with 93,727 males and 97,245 females. The current population based Ghana Statistical Service record is 235,465.

== Sources ==
- "Districts of Ghana". Statoids.
- GhanaDistricts.com
