= Tema Metropolitan Assembly =

- District
- Districts of Greater Accra Region

- Location of Tema Metropolitan Assembly within Greater Accra
- Coordinates: 5°38′32″N 0°0′9″W
- Country: Ghana
- Region: Greater Accra
- Capital: Tema

Government
  - Metropolitan Chief Executive: Ebi Bright

Area
  - Total: 565 km^{2} (218 sq mi)

Population (2021)
  - Total: 177,924
- Time zone: UTC+0 (GMT)
- ISO 3166 code: GH-AA-TE

Tema Metropolitan Assembly is one of the twenty-nine districts in Greater Accra Region, Ghana. Originally created as a municipal district assembly in 1988 when it was known as Tema Municipal District, which was created from the former Tema District Council, until two parts of the district were later split off to create Adenta Municipal Assembly (from the northwest part) and Ashaiman Municipal District (from the north central part) respectively on 29 February 2008; thus the remaining part was elevated to metropolitan district assembly status on that same year to become Tema Metropolitan District. However on 28 June 2012, the eastern part of the district was split off to create Kpone-Katamanso District (which was later elevated to municipal district assembly status to become Kpone-Katamanso Municipal District on 15 March 2018); thus the remaining part has been retained as Tema Metropolitan District. Later on 15 March 2018, a small western portion of the district was split off to create Tema West Municipal District; thus the remaining part has been retained as Tema Metropolitan District. The metropolis is located in the central part of Greater Accra Region and has Tema as its capital town.

== Background ==
Tema Metropolitan Assembly was made up of Three Constituencies (Tema East, Tema Central, Tema West). This metropolis is grouped into twenty-six communities. The most popular and busiest communities are Communities 1, 2, 4, 7, 8, 9, 13 (Sakumono), 18, 19 and 20.

== See also ==
- Tema Manhean
