= Madina, Ghana =

Madina
- Town
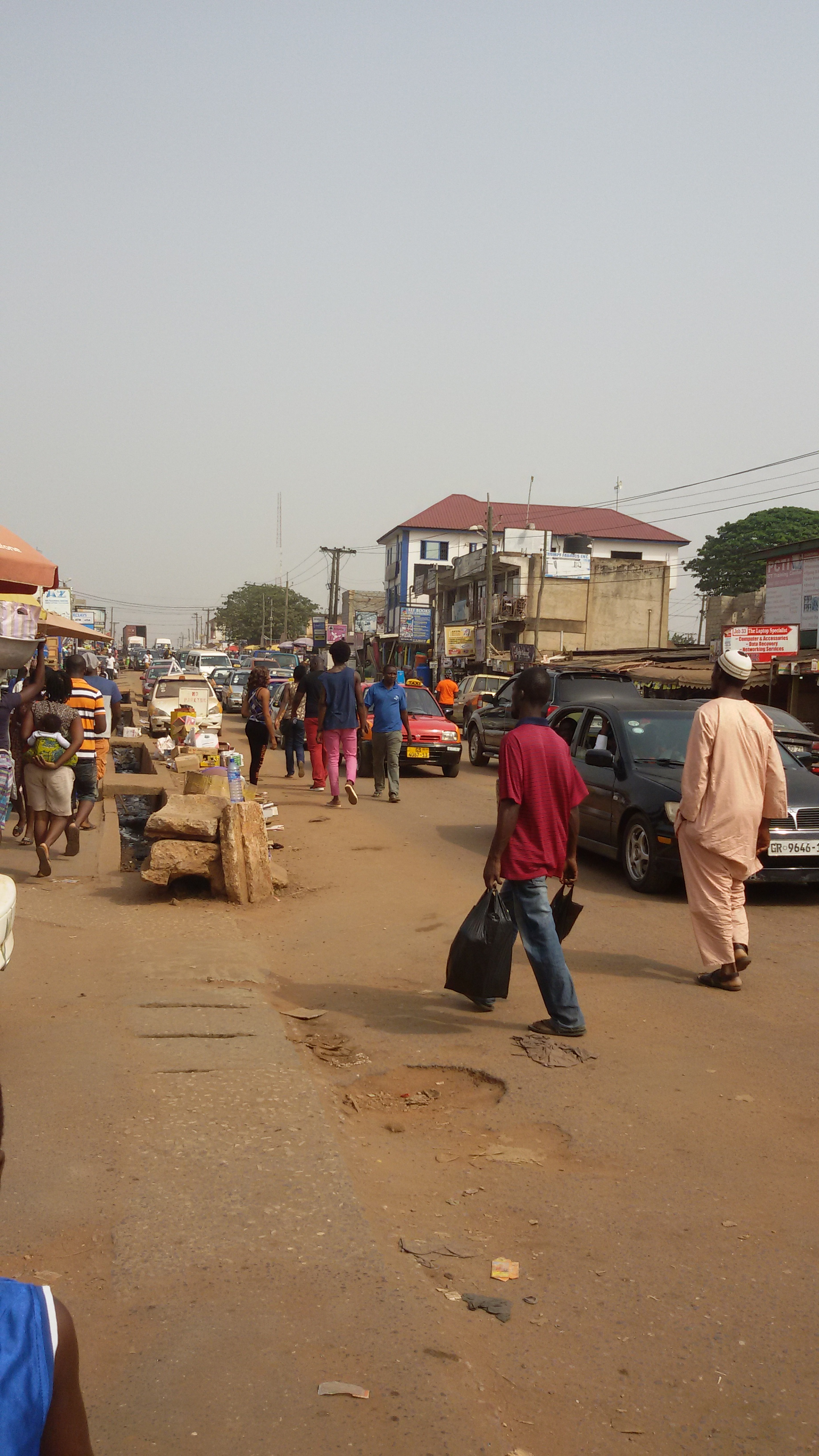
- Madina Market in Accra

- Location in Ghana
- Coordinates: 5°41′0″N 0°10′0″W
- Country: Ghana
- Region: Greater Accra Region
- District: La Nkwantanang Madina Municipal District

Population (2012)
  - Total: 137,162
- Ranked 12th in Ghana
- Time zone: GMT
  - Summer (DST): GMT

Madina is a suburb of Accra and in the La Nkwantanang Madina Municipal District, a district in the Greater Accra Region of southeastern Ghana. Madina is next to the University of Ghana and houses the Institute of Local Government. Madina is the twelfth most populous settlement in Ghana, in terms of population, with a population of 137,162 people. History has it that Madina was established by people from different ethnic backgrounds and some foreigners led by Alhaji Seidu Kardo. Madina is contained in the Madina electoral constituency of the republic of Ghana. It shares borders with Adentan Municipal on the west, the Accra Metropolitan Assembly to the South and the Akwapim South District. to the north.

== Education in Madina ==
Education in Madina can be categorised into Government, religious and private. Some tertiary and second cycle schools located within the municipality includes and not limited to University of Professional Studies formerly known as the Institute of professional Studies, Islamic University College Ghana established with the aim of providing quality tertiary education to the youths, especially Muslim and the less-privileged or marginalised communities in Ghana, Wisconsin International University. Accra College of Education is the only public teacher training college located in Accra. It was established in 1902 with the mission to train and orient student-teachers to become competent professional teachers of high caliber for Basic schools in Ghana through quality teaching and learning, research and application of modern technologies. Presbyterian Boys' Secondary School, Institute of Local Government Studies and Trinity Theological Seminary for the training of the Clergy,

== Politics ==
The multiparty system in Ghana permits citizens to freely join any political party of their choice. Parliamentary aspirants from the two main political parties won the parliamentary elections between 2005 and 2020 to become members of parliament. Members of parliament from 2005 to date are Alhaji Bukari Amadu Sorogho, who was a member of Parliament from 2005 to 2017, Alhaji Abu-bakar, and Saddique Boniface 2017 – 2021. The incumbent member of parliament for the Madina Municipality 2021 – 2025 is Lawyer Francis Xavier Kojo Sosu

== Religion and Beliefs ==
The majority of the residents are Muslims and Christians, with few practicing traditional religions. Although residents practice different religions, they co-exist peacefully.

== Madina Market ==
Madina market is one of the biggest and most vibrant markets in Accra. Located on the Chief Alhaji Seidu Street, popularly known as Old road. It spans from Madina Zongo junction to Madina Polyclinic, Kekele, the main entrance can be found opposite to the Madina Divisional Police Station. Vendors, sellers and providers of services at the market are active and competitive. Hawkers of various items mingle or display variety of items on tables and pavements along the street, thereby increases the visibility of the market to both travellers and visitors.

== See also ==
- Railway stations in Ghana
