= Ashaiman =

Town in Greater Accra Region, Ghana

Ashaiman Ashiaman
- Town
- Etymology: Ga: Ashaimam (Combination of "Ashai" and "Mang"–Ashai's town)
- Location of Ashaiman in Greater Accra Region
- Coordinates: 5°42′N 0°02′W
- Country: Ghana
- Region: Greater Accra Region
- District: Ashaiman Municipal District

Government
  - Mantse: Nii Annang Adzor
- Elevation: 128 ft (39 m)

Population (2021)
  - Total: 208,060
  - Ethnicities: Ga-Adangbe; Ga; Guan; Hausa; Fante people; Dagomba; Ewe; Ashanti; Akuapem
- Time zone: GMT
  - Summer (DST): GMT
- Postcode district: GB
- Area code: 030
- Climate: Aw
- Website: ashma.gov.gh

Ashaiman (often wrongly spelled as "Ashiaman") is a large town and the capital of the Ashaiman Municipal District in the Greater Accra Region of Ghana. According to the 2021 census, the town, along with the district, has a population of 208,060 people. Ethnic groups who resided in Ashaiman are the Ga-Adangbe, Ga, Guan, Hausa, Fante people, Dagomba, Ewe, Ashanti, and Akuapem. The current Mantse of the town is Nii Annang Adzor.

== Etymology ==
According to local belief, the name came from two Ga words: "Ashai", the first name of the man who had founded the town (Ibrahim Nii Ashai), and "Mang" which means "town". Therefore, it is abbreviated to "Ashaiman".

== History ==
Ashaiman was founded by Nii Ashai after he had moved from Tema. The town was expanded by squatters who were building Tema and others and had moved in to occupy government land.

== Demographics ==
Most of the population is religious coming in with 96.9% while the other 3.1% aren't affiliated with any religions. The biggest religions in the town are Christianity (approx. 80%), Islam (16.5%), and traditional religions (0.4%). Major Ethnic groups who lived in Ashaiman are the Ga-Adangbe, Ga, Guan, Hausa, Fante people, Dagomba, Ewe, Ashanti, and Akuapem.

== Economy ==
The biggest economic sector in the town is agriculture, followed by manufacturing and services.

== Culture ==
Ashaiman, along with other parts of Ghana, has a paramount chief or Omanhene in which the current placeholder is Nii Annang Adzor.

== Geography ==
Ashaiman is located in the Ashaiman Municipal which has an total land area of 45 square kilometres (17 sq mi). The district bordered Kpone Katamanso Municipal District to the north and east and the Tema Metropolitan District towards the south and the west.

=== Climate ===
The town has a tropical savanna climate (Köppen climate classification Aw), experiencing a wet season and a dry season and the temperature being hot year-round. The average annual rainfall ranges from 730 to 790 mm (2.40 to 2.59 ft). The wet season usually starts from April to June while the dry is from September to November.

== Human resources ==
=== Health ===
On 3 October 2024, it was announced that a 190-bed district hospital would be built in Ashaiman as part of Ghana's Agenda 111 programme, a national initiative aimed at improving access to healthcare infrastructure. The project was reported to have an estimated budget of US$12 million and was expected to be completed in late 2024.

As of December 2025, construction had not commenced at the proposed site, and no official public statement had been issued confirming the continuation or revised status of the project.

=== Education ===
The most well-known educational institution in the town is the Ashaiman Senior High School. It was founded in September 1990 by the Provisional National Defence Council and it began with 39 students and two teachers. Currently the school has a population of about 1,400 students and 104 teachers. Courses offered in the school include General Arts, General Science, Agriculture, Business and Visual Arts.

Local education commentators have highlighted the role of school discipline in improving academic performance and student outcomes in Ashaiman.

== See also ==
- Railway stations in Ghana
