= Abokobi-Madina =

Constituency in Ghana

- constituency for the Parliament of Ghana
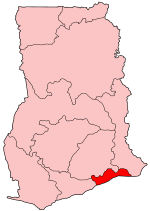
- District: Ga East District
- Region: Greater Accra Region of Ghana

Current constituency
- Created: 2004
- Party: New Patriotic Party
- MP: Hon. Abubakar Boniface

Abokobi-Madina is one of the constituencies represented in the Parliament of Ghana. It elects one Member of Parliament (MP) by the first past the post system of election. Abokobi-Madina is located in the Ga East District of the Greater Accra Region of Ghana.

== Boundaries ==
The constituency is located within the Ga East District of the Greater Accra Region of Ghana.

== Members of Parliament ==
Election	Member	Party
2004	Alhaji Amadu Bukari Sorogho	National Democratic Congress
2008	Alhaji Amadu Bukari Sorogho	National Democratic Congress

== Elections ==
2008 Ghanaian parliamentary election: Abokobi-Madina Source:Ghana Home Page
Party	Candidate	Votes	%	±%
National Democratic Congress	Alhaji Amadu Bukari Sorogho	34,073	55.5	+5.3
New Patriotic Party	Abdulai Baba Zakaria	27,368	44.5	+2.9
Majority		6,705	11.0	+8.2
Turnout				—

2004 Ghanaian parliamentary election: Abokobi-Madina Source:Electoral Commission of Ghana
Party	Candidate	Votes	%	±%
National Democratic Congress	Alhaji Amadu Bukari Sorogho	32,080	50.2	
New Patriotic Party	James Amoah	30,330	47.4	
Convention People's Party	Joseph Teye Mortey	752	1.2	—
Independent	Mrs. Hadaassa Adokaley Bush	408	0.6	—
Democratic People's Party	Frederick Kwaku Nfodjo	373	0.6	—
Majority		1,750	2.8	—
Turnout		64,556	84.3	—

== See also ==
- List of Ghana Parliament constituencies
