= Bernard Okoe-Boye =

Ghanaian politician

Member of the Ghana Parliament for Ledzokuku Constituency
- In office 7 January 2017 – 7 January 2021
- Preceded by: Benita Sena Okity-Duah
- Succeeded by: Benjamin Narteh Ayiku

Personal details
- Born: 25 January 1982 (age 44) Teshie
- Party: New Patriotic Party
- Education: Presbyterian Boys' Secondary; Kwame Nkrumah University of Science and Technology
- Occupation: Medical Doctor
- Profession: Medical Doctor

Bernard Okoe-Boye is a Ghanaian medical doctor. He is also a politician and was a member of the Seventh Parliament of the Fourth Republic of Ghana representing the Ledzokuku Constituency in the Greater Accra Region on the ticket of the New Patriotic Party. He was once the board chairman of the Korle Bu Teaching Hospital, the nation's largest medical facility. He was also the chief executive officer of the National Health InsuranceAuthority(NHIA) mandated to run the affairs of Ghana's pro-poor health insurance policy, the National Health Insurance Scheme (Ghana). On 14 February 2024, he was nominated for consideration by Parliament as Minister of Health.

He advocated for the removal of some tax handles on dialysis consumables to lessen the “enormous burden” associated with renal treatment in March 2024.

== Early life and education ==
He comes from Teshie which falls under the Ledzokuku Constituency where he served as member of Parliament. He attended the Field Engineers Junior High School for his Basic Education Certificate. Okoe-Boye is an old student of the Presbyterian Boys' Secondary School ( Presec-Legon) where he completed his secondary school education in the year 2000. Bernard Okoe Boye is a licensed medical practitioner. He holds BSC in Human Biology, Medicine and Surgery from the Kwame Nkrumah University of Science and Technology. He also holds a master's degree in Public Health (MPH) from Hamburg University of Applied Sciences and an A1 certificate in German from the Geothe Institute, Accra. Medical licence (MEDICAL AND DENTAL COUNCIL)

== Personal life ==
He is a Christian.

== Career ==
=== Health sector ===
Okoe-Boye had his house job at the Ghana Health Service from 2009 to 2012 at the Central Regional Hospital, Department of Surgery, Pediatrics and Obstetrics and Gynecology, Cape Coast, from 2009 to 2011, and then at the Department of Internal Medicine, Tema General Hospital. He then continued as a medical officer in the same institution for four years where he worked at Kibi Government Hospital, Department of Obstetrics and Gynecology and the La General Hospital. Prior to his entry into parliament, Oko-Boye was a medical officer at the LekMA Hospital in Accra.

=== Politics ===
Okoe-Boye was elected MP for Ledzokuku Constituency in the Greater Accra Region on 7 December 2016 was sworn in on 7 January 2017. He is a member of the Health and Government Assurances Committees of Parliament.

On 4 April 2020, Okoe-Boye was nominated by President Akufo-Addo to serve as a deputy health minister and was subsequently sworn in on 21 April 2020. He however lost the Ledzokuku parliamentary seat in the 2020 Ghanaian general election to Benjamin Narteh Ayiku of the NDC. On 21 April 2022, he was appointed the CEO of the National Health Insurance Agency overseeing the National Health Insurance Scheme

== Committees ==
1.Government Assurance Committee

2.Health Committee
