= Nii Nortey Duah =

Ghanaian politician

- Preceded by: Gladys Nortey Ashitey
- Succeeded by: Benita Sena Okity-Duah

MP for Ledzokuku
- In office 7 January 2009 – 6 January 2013
- President: John Evans Atta Mills

Personal details
- Born: 1 July 1953
- Died: 21 December 2017 (aged 64)
- Party: National Democratic Congress
- Children: 4
- Education: University of Ghana
- Occupation: Politician
- Profession: Journalist

Nii Nortey Duah (1 July 1953 – 21 December 2017) was a journalist, advertiser and communication expert. He was also a politician and former member of parliament for the Ledzokuku constituency in the Greater Accra Region of Ghana.

== Early life and career ==
Duah was born in 1953 and comes from Teshie-Accra in the Greater Accra Region of Ghana. He studied at the University of Ghana where he earned a Master of Arts degree in Communication studies in 1989. He worked as a lecturer at the Ghana Institute of Journalism.

== Politics ==
Duah's political career began in 2004 when he contested for the Ledzokuku seat on the ticket of the National Democratic Congress but lost the seat to Gladys Nortey Ashitey. He contested again in 2008 and won, becoming a member of the Fifth Parliament in the Fourth Republic of Ghana. He won the Ledzokuku seat on the ticket of the NDC with a total number of 42,087 votes out of the 73,989 valid votes cast, gaining a percentage of 56.9% out of 100%. In the 2012 elections, he lost the Ledzokuku seat to Benita Sena Okity-Duah.

== Personal life ==
Duah was a Christian who worshipped with the Presbyterian Church of Ghana. He was married with four children.

== Death ==
Duah died at the 37 Military hospital on 21 December 2017.
