= Benjamin Narteh Ayiku =

Ghanaian politician

Hon. Benjamin Narteh Ayiku MP
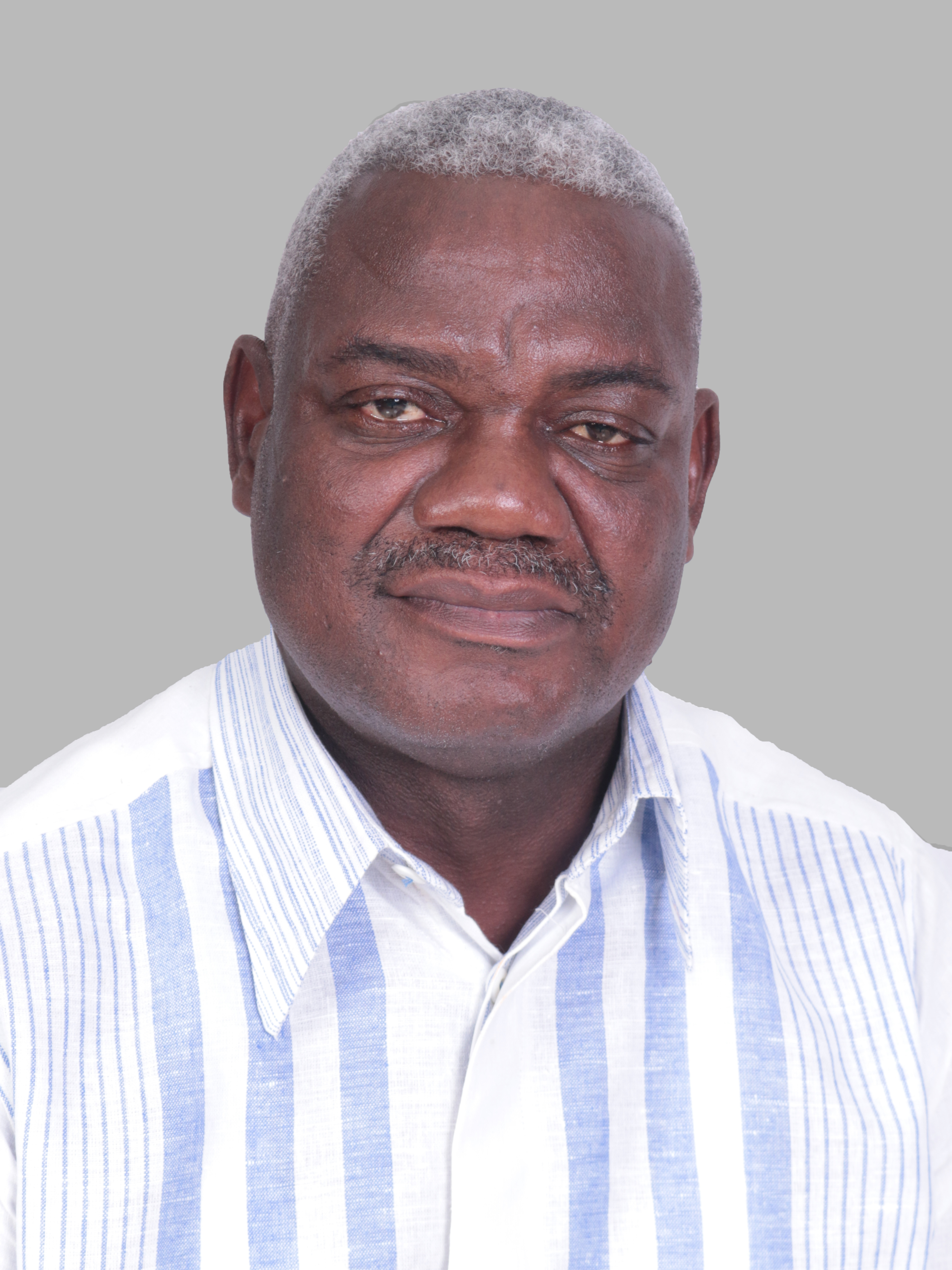

Member of the Ghana Parliament for Ledzokuku Constituency
- Incumbent
- Assumed office 7 January 2021
- Preceded by: Bernard Okoe Boye

Personal details
- Born: 5 August 1964 (age 62) Teshie
- Party: National Democratic Congress(NDC)
- Education: SAINT THOMAS AQUINAS SECONDARY SCHOOL
- Occupation: Politician
- Profession: Dealer

Parliament of Ghana

Benjamin Narteh Ayiku (born 5 August 1964) is a Ghanaian politician. He is a member of the Eighth Parliament of the Fourth Republic of Ghana representing the Ledzokuku Constituency in the Ledzokuku Municipal District in the Greater Accra Region of Ghana.

== Early life and career ==
Ayiku was born on 5 August 1964. He hails from Teshie. He holds a General Certificate Of Education (1986).

== Politics ==
Ayiku is a member of the National Democratic Congress(NDC). He was the party's candidate for the December 2020 election. He won the parliamentary election with 55,938 votes representing 50.5% of the total votes cast, beating his main opponent and incumbent member of parliament Bernard Okoe Boye of the New patriotic Party who obtained 54,072 votes representing 48.8% of the total valid votes cast.

In May 2023, he was selected through voting to represent yet again, the National Democratic Congress(NDC) in the upcoming 2024 general elections as the parliamentary candidate for the Ledzokuku Constituency

=== Committees ===
He serves as a member of Food, Agriculture and Cocoa Affairs Committee and Members holding Office of Profit Committee respectively in the Eighth Parliament of the Fourth Republic of Ghana.

== Personal life ==
He is a Christian.
