= Sakumo Ramsar Site =

Designations

Ramsar Wetland
- Designated: 14 August 1992
- Reference no.: 565

Sakumo Ramsar Site
- Location in Ghana
- Coordinates: 5°37′46″N 0°02′35″W
- Country: Ghana
- Region: Greater Accra Region

The Sakumo Ramsar Site also known as the Sakumo Lagoon is a wetland of international importance. It covers an area of 1,400 hectares (3,500 acres) and is situated along the coastal road between Accra and Tema in the Greater Accra Region of Ghana. It is about 3 km (1.9 mi) west of Tema. Activities ongoing within the site include farming, fishing, recreation, urban and industrial development.

== Ramsar Site ==
Sakumo wetlands was proposed as a Ramsar Site in 1987. In 1992 it was gazetted as a Ramsar Site by which time about one third of the area originally proposed had been used for settlement development.

== Lagoon ==
The size of the open lagoon varies from 100–350 hectares (250–860 acres) depending on the season. In the rainy season it expands, and shrinks in the dry season. Large portions of the lagoon dry up in the dry season, resulting in hyper-saline conditions. The lagoon is separated from the sea by a narrow road, connecting Accra and Tema. A small permanent connection to the sea has been established by an open sluice, constructed to prevent the flooding of the coastal road, such as had occurred in the past.

=== Flora ===
The flood-plain is periodically inundated, and the flooded areas are largely devoid of vegetation. There are also areas of freshwater marsh and coastal savanna grassland, the latter consisting mainly of Sesuvium portulacastrum with various associated grass species. Land-use in the catchment includes rice, cassava, and vegetable cultivation.

=== Fauna ===
==== Fish ====
The lagoon has 1 km^{2} (0.39 sq mi) surface area, and is defined as semi-closed because of its permanent, but limited interaction with the sea.

Sixteen fish species or genera have been found in the lagoon, and may be grouped in four main categories as follows:

- Fresh water fish occurring only during the rainy season (e.g. Clarias gariepinus)
- Permanent inhabitants of the lagoon (e.g. Sarotherodon melanotheron)
- Juvenile stages of marine fish swimming into the lagoon after the rainy season (e.g. Mugil cephalus)
- Marine fish coming for short incursions into the lagoon (e.g. Lutjanus fulgens)

The lagoon is heavily over-fished, resulting in a reduced catch over the years.

==== Avifauna ====
Past records have registered over seventy waterbird species at the site, with about 30,000 birds. The common species are common ringed plover, black tern, little egret, western reef heron, common tern, Sandwich tern and spotted redshank. Some breeding waterbirds include collared pratincole, Kittlitz's plover and little tern. The black heron is considered sacred and protected by local taboos. The site has been designated an Important Bird Area (IBA) by BirdLife International because it supports significant populations of many bird species.

==== Marine turtle ====
Species of marine turtle that have previously been recorded nesting on the beach are olive ridley, green and leatherback sea turtles.

== Conservation Issues ==
The area which was designated in 1992, currently has portions taken over by land developers (urban and industrial). The surrounding area has one of the highest urban growth-rates within the coastal zone. Sewage and domestic waste from the catchment also threatens the lagoon. The spread of urbanization continues, and if not stopped the entire catchment will be destroyed. The area has high recreational and educational or research value as one of the green areas left in the Accra-Tema Metropolitan Area. The lagoon is regarded as a fetish by the indigenous people of Tema, New Town.

During the dry season (August to March), the larger part of the lagoon dries up. The area is encroached upon by cattle grazing in the dry season, and by land developers who build very close to the site -- which is a government property and should not be used by any developer. There is a Biodiversity Conservation and Local Community Development Project to rehabilitate degraded areas and conserve the biodiversity within the Sakumo Ramsar Site.

== Rehabilitation of site ==
The Wildlife Division of the Forestry Commission is the government agency responsible for the area. The Environmental Protection Agency-Ghana and the United Nation Environment Programme initiated an afforestation project of planting trees in the wetland area, using treated waste water as a way of reforesting and conserving the degraded areas. Others are Sakumo Ramsar Conservation and Resource Users Association and the Friends of Ramsar Sites. The surrounding communities such as Klagon, Sakumono and Nungua are protecting the site.
