= Jacob Aplerh Tawiah =

Ghanaian politician

Hon. Jacob Aplerh Tawiah

Member of parliament for Krowor constituency
- In office 7 January 1993 – 7 January 1997
- President: Jerry John Rawlings
- Succeeded by: Joshua Alabi

Personal details
- Born: 12 September 1945 (age 81)
- Party: National Democratic Congress
- Education: University of Michigan
- Occupation: politician
- Profession: Hospital Administrator

Jacob Aplerh Tawiah (born 1945) is a Ghanaian politician and a Hospital Administrator. He served as a Member of Parliament for Krowor constituency in Greater Accra Region of Ghana.

== Early life and education ==
Tawiah was born on 12 September 1945. He attended the University of Michigan where he obtained a master of philosophy.

== Politics ==
Jacob Aplerh Tawiah was elected into parliament during the 1992 Ghanaian parliamentary election, and became a Member of the First Parliament of the Fourth Republic of Ghana on the ticket of the National Democratic Congress.

He lost the seat in 1996 Ghanaian general election to Joshua Alabi of National Democratic Congress who took the seat with 16,445 votes representing 39.5% of the share by defeating Samuel Okla Bortei-Doku of the New Patriotic Party who obtained 14,514 votes which represent 34.90% of the share; Samuel Carter of the People's National Convention who obtained 457 votes which represent 1.10% of the share; S. C. A. Botchway of Convention People's Party who obtained 445 votes which represent 1.10% of the share and aro Mahama an independent who obtained no votes.

== Career ==
Jacob Aplerh Tawiah was the former Member of the First Parliament of the Fourth Republic of Ghana for Krowor Constituency from 7 January 1993 to 6 January 1997. He is a Hospital Administrator.

== Personal life ==
Jacob Aplerh Tawiah is a Christian.

Spouse

Patience Afoley Odai

Children

Jemima Tawiah, Jones Borteye Aplerh, Abigail Sam-Brew, Patrick Tawiah Mills, Ransford Bortier, Edith Adams, Audrey Aplerh-Tawiah, Pearl Bortier, Eddna Aplerh-Tawiah
