= Bahubali (boxer) =

Ghanaian Boxer

Ernest Akushey
Personal information
- Other names: Bahubali
- Nationality: Ghanaian
- Born: Chorkor, Accra
- Height: 6 ft 6 in (198 cm)

Boxing career
- Weight class: Heavyweight and Light middleweight
- Stance: Orthodox

Boxing record
- Total fights: 8
- Wins: 6
- Win by KO: 5
- Losses: 2
- Draws: 0

Ernest Akushey (1993–23 September 2025) also known as Bahubali, was a Ghanaian boxer.

== Early life ==
He was born in Chorkor.

== Career ==
He fought in the Super heavyweight and Light middleweight division depending on the kind of opponent he faces. He had 8 fights, 6 of them were wins, 2 were loses, 5 of his fights came through knockout given him a 75% rating.

His last fight was with Jacob Dickson,on the 12 September 2025 at the Bukom Boxing Arena ended with a Technical Knockout (TKO) in round 8.

== Death ==
He died at the Teshie Lekma Hospital on 23 September 2025 due to an illness days after his bout.
