= List of candidates in the 2024 Ghanaian parliamentary election =

Prior to the 2024 Ghanaian parliamentary election, political parties chose candidates for the 276 seats in the Parliament of Ghana.

== New Patriotic Party ==
=== Constituencies with sitting MPs ===
Greater Accra

Constituency	Incumbent	Status	Candidates elect
Ayawaso Central	Henry Quartey	Retained	
Ablekuma North	Sheila Bartels	Lost	Nana Akua Owusu Afriyieh
Ablekuma West	Ursula Owusu-Ekuful	Retained	
Amasaman	Akwasi Owusu Afrifa Mensah	Lost	Yahya Kassim Atta
Anyaa Sowutuom	Dickson Adomako Kissi	Lost	Emmanuel Tobin
Bortianior-Ngleshie-Amanfrom	Sylvester Tetteh	Retained	
Dome Kwabenya	Sarah Adwoa Safo	Lost	Mike Oquaye Jnr
Tema Central	Yves Hanson-Nortey	Lost	Charles Forson
Trobu	Moses Anim	Lost	Gloria Owusu
Weija Gbawe	Tina Gifty Naa Ayeley Mensah	Lost	Jerry Ahmed Shab

Ashanti Region

Constituency	Incumbent	Status	Candidates elect
Adansi Asokwa	Kobina Tabir Hammond	Retained	

Afigya Kwabre North	Collins Adomako Mensah	Retained	
Afigya Sekyere East	Mavis Nkansah-Boadu	Retained	
Asante Akim Central	Kwame Ayimadu-Antwi	Retained	
Asante Akim North	Andy Kwame Appiah-Kubi	Retained	
Asante Akim South	Kwaku Asante-Boateng	Retained	
Asokwa	Patricia Appiagyei	Retained	
Atwima Kwanwoma	Kofi Amankwa-Manu	Retained	
Atwima Mponua	Isaac Kwame Asiamah	Lost	Owusu Sekyere
Atwima Nwabiagya South	Emmanuel Agyei Anhwere	Lost	Shirley Kyei
Bantama	Francis Asenso-Boakye	Retained	
Bosome Freho	Akwasi Darko Boateng	Lost	Nana Kwame Asafo Adjei Ayeh
Juaben	Ama Pomaa Boateng	Lost	Francis Kwabena B Owusu-Akyaw
Kwadaso	Kingsley Nvarko	Retained	
Mampong	Kwaku Ampratwum-Sarpong	Injunction	
Manhyia North	Akwasi Konadu	Retained	
Manhyia South	Dr. Matthew Opoku Prempeh	Retained	
Nyiaeso	Dr. Stephen Amoah	Retained	
Manso Adubia	Yaw Frimpong Addo	Retained	
Manso Nkwanta	George Kwabena Obeng Takyi	Lost	Tweneboa Kodua Fokuo
Nsuta Kwamang Beposo	Adelaide Ntim	Retained	

Obuasi East	Patrick Boakye-Yiadom	Retained	
Obuasi West	Kwaku Agyemang Kwarteng	Retained	
Odotobri	Emmanuel Akwasi Gyamfi	Lost	Anthony Mmiehm
Offinso North	Ntim Augustine Collins	Lost	Rockson Kwaku Adu Boahen
Old Tafo	Vicent Ekow Assafuah	Retained	
Subin	Eugene Boakye Antwi	Lost	Kofi Obiri-Frimpong

Eastern Region

Constituency	Incumbent	Status	Candidates elect
Abirem	Osei John Frimpong	Lost	Charles Owriedu
Abuakwa North	Gifty Twum-Ampofo	Lost	Nana Ampaw Addo-Frempong
Asene Akroso Manso	George Kwame Aboagye	Retained	
Ofoase/Ayirebi	Kojo Oppong Nkrumah	Retained	
Kade	Agyare Alexander	Retained	
Lower West Akim	Charles Acheampong	Retained	
Asene Akroso Manso	George Kwame Aboagye	Retained	
Nkawkaw	Joseph Frempong	Retained	
Atiwa East	Abena Osei-Asare	Retained	
Mpraeso	Davis Ansah Opoku	Retained	
Akim Swedru	Kennedy Osei Nyarko	Retained	
Suhum	Kwadjo Asante	Lost	Frank Asiedu Bekoe

New Juaben South	Michael Okyere Baafi	Retained	
Fanteakwa South	Kofi Okyere-Agyekum	Lost	Kwame Appiah Kodua
Fanteakwa North	Kwabena Amankwa Asiamah	Lost	Duke Ofori-Atta
Achiase	Kofi Ahenkorah Marfo	Retained	

Central Region

Constituency	Incumbent	Status	Candidates elect
Awutu Senya East	Mavis Hawa Koomson	Retained	
Agona West	Cynthia Mamle Morrison	Lost	Chris Jojo Arhin Arthur
Gomoa Central	Naana Eyiah	Retained	
Abura Asebu Kwamankese	Elvis Morris Donkoh	Lost	Etudur Kobina Nyanteh
Hemang Lower Denkyira	Bright Wireko-Brobby	Lost	Lawrence Agyinsam
Mfantseman	Ophelia Mensah	Retained	

Northern Region

Constituency	Incumbent	Status	Candidates Elect
Mion	Musah Abdul-Aziz Ayaba	Retained	

Nanton	Mohammed Hardi Tufeiru	Retained	
Yendi	Umar Farouk Aliu Mahama	Retained	
Zabzugu	Jabaah John Bennam	Lost	Alhaji Fawaz Aliu

Western Region

Constituency	Incumbent	Status	Candidates Elect
Efia	Joseph Cudjoe	Lost	Yaw Boamah-Nyarko
Tarkwa-Nsuaem	George Mireku Duker	Retained	
Kwesimintsim	Prince Hamid Armah	Retained	
Sekondi	Andrew Kofi Egyapa Mercer	Retained	
Mpohor	John Kobin Abbam Aboah Sanie	Retained	
Shama	Samuel Erickson Abakah	Lost	Isaac Kwamina Afful

Takoradi	Kwabena Okyere Darko-Mensah	Retained

Western North

Constituency	Incumbent	Status	Candidates Elect
Bibiani-Anhwiaso Bekwai	Alfred Obeng Boateng	Retained	
Sefwi Akontombra	Djornobuah Alex Tetteh	Retained	
Upper West Region
Sissala East	Amidu Chinnia Issahaku	Retained	
Savannah Region
Daboya-Mankarigu	Mahama Asei Seini	Lost	Samuel Tika Yeyu
Salaga North	Alhassan Abdallah Iddi	Retained	
North-East Region
Walewale	Lariba Zuwera Abudu	Lost	Dr. Kabiru Mahama
Bono East Region

Pru East	Dr. Kwabena Donkor	Lost	Lord Kwaku Boan
Ahafo Region
Tano North	Freda Prempeh	Lost	Dr Gideon Boako
Asunafo North	Asunafo North	Retained	
Asutifi North	Patrick Banor	Retained	
Bono Region
Berekum West	Kwaku Agyenim Boateng	Retained	
Dormaa Central	Kwaku Agyeman Manu	Retained	
Berekum East	Nelson Kyeremeh	Rationed	
Sunyani West	Ignatius Baffour Awuah	Retained	
Western North Region
Bibiani-Anhwiaso Bekwai	Alfred Obeng Boateng	Retained	
Sefwi Akontombra	Alex Tetteh	Retained	

=== Seats with retiring MPs ===
The following MPs who have decided not to seek re-election and the Individuals who were elected to replace them:

S/N	Constituency	Outgoing MP	Parliamentary candidate
1	Suame	Osei Kyei-Mensah-Bonsu	John Darko
2	Bekwai	Joe Osei Owusu	Ralph Poku-Adusei
3	Oforikrom	Emmanuel Marfo	Michael Kwesi Aidoo
4	Abuakwa South	Samuel Atta Akyea	Kinsley Agyeman
5	Okere	Dan Botwe	Daniel Nana Addo Kenneth
6	Essikado Ketan	Joe Ghartey	Charles Bissue
7	Assin Central	Kennedy Agyapong	Godfred Anti Anewu
8	Atiwa West	Kwasi Amoako-Atta	Lauretie Korkor Asante
9	Sefwi Wiaso	Dr. Kwaku Afriyie	Festus Bumakama Agyapong
10	Atwima Nwabiagya	Benito Owusu-Bio	Frank Yeboah
11	New Juaben North	Nana Kwasi Adjei Boateng	Nana Osei-Adjei
12	Afigya Kwabre South	William Owuraku Aidoo	Damata Ama Appianimaa Salam
13	Ahafo Ano South West	Johnson Adu	Elvis Osei Mensah Dapaah
14	Tema West	Carlos Ahenkorah	Dennis Amfo-Sefah
15	Ahafo Ano South East	Francis Manu-Adabor	Frederick Acheampong
16	Ahafo Ano North	Suleman Sanid	Eric Nana Agyemang-Prempeh
17	Ahanta West	Kojo Kum	Francis Eric Pobee
18	Kwabre East	Francis Oteng	Onyina-Acheampong Akwasi Gyamfi
19	Akuapem South	Osei Bonsu Amoah	Daniel Nana Addo Kenneth

== National Democratic Congress ==
Elected parliamentary candidates for the 2024 general elections

Upper East Region

Region	Constituency	Name of aspirants	Remarks
Upper East	Navrongo Central	Simon Akibange Aworigo	Elected
Upper East	Chiana-Paga	Nikyema Billa Alamzy	Elected
Upper East	Bolgatanga Central	Adongo Isaac	Unopposed
Upper East	Bolga East	Dr. Dominic Akuritinga Ayine	Elected
Upper East	Bongo	Charles Bawaduah	Elected
Upper East	Talensi	Mahama Daniel Dung	Elected
Upper East	Nabdam	Dr. Mark Kurt Nawaane	Elected
Upper East	Zebilla	Ebenezer Alumire Ndebilla	Elected
Upper East	Bawku Central	Mahama Ayariga	Elected
Upper East	Pusiga	Ayamba Laadi Ayii	Elected
Upper East	Garu	Thomas Winsum Anabah	Elected
Upper East	Tempane	Akanvariba Lydia Lamisi	Unopposed
Upper East	Binduri	Issifu Mahmoud	Elected

Northern Region

Region	Constituency	Name of aspirant	Remarks
Northern	Kpandai	Daniel Nsala Wakpal	Unopposed
Northern	Bimbilla	Joseph Kwabena Manboah-Rockson	Elected
Northern	Wulensi	Dawuni Abukari	Elected
Northern	Zabzugu	Alhassan Umar	Elected
Northern	Tatale/Sanguli	Ntebe Ayo William	Elected
Northern	Yendi	Abdul-Fatawu Alhassan	Elected
Northern	Mion	Misbahu Mahama Adams	Elected
Northern	Saboba	Bukari Nikpe Joseph	Elected
Northern	Gushegu	Mohammed Yussif Malimali	Elected
Northern	Karaga	Alhassan Sualihu Dandaawa	Elected
Northern	Savelugu	Abdulai Jacob Iddrisu	Elected
Northern	Nanton	Abdul-Khaliq Mohammed Sherif	Elected
Northern	Tamale South	Iddrisu Haruna	Unopposed
Northern	Tamale Central	Ibrahim Murtala Muhammed	Unopposed
Northern	Sagnarigu	Atta Issah	Elected
Northern	Tamale North	Alhassan Sayibu Suhuyini	Unopposed
Northern	Tolon	Osman Tahidu Damba	Elected
Northern	Kumbungu	Hamza Adam	Elected

Ashanti Region

Region	Constituency	Name of aspirant	Remarks
Ashanti	New Edubiase	Adams Abdul Salam	Elected
Ashanti	Akrofuom	Joseph Azumah	Unopposed
Ashanti	Fomena		No Elections Yet
Ashanti	Adansi Asokwa		No Elections Yet
Ashanti	Obuasi West	Faustilove Appiah Kannin	Elected
Ashanti	Obuasi East	Samuel Aboagye	Unopposed
Ashanti	Bekwai	Samuel Prempeh Jnr	Unopposed
Ashanti	Bosome Freho	Appiah-Kubi Charles	Unopposed
Ashanti	Odotobri	Emmanuel Obeng-Agyemang	Elected
Ashanti	Manso Nkwanta	Samuel Adjei	Elected
Ashanti	Manso Adubia	Marfo Benjamin	Elected
Ashanti	Atwima Nwabiagya South	Osei Boamah Wisdom	Elected
Ashanti	Atwima Nwabiagya North	Mba Zechariah Alenbilla	Elected
Ashanti	Atwima Mponua	Yeboah Stephen	Elected
Ashanti	Bosomtwe	Abdullah Hamidu	Elected
Ashanti	Atwima Kwanwoma	Grace Agyemang Asamoa	Elected
Ashanti	Bantama	Simeon Addai Dapaah	Elected
Ashanti	Nhyiaeso	Faustina Dery Bayor	Elected
Ashanti	Manhyia South	Rita Amonu Gyamfua	No Elections Yet
Ashanti	Manhyia North	Hamza Swallah	Unopposed
Ashanti	Subin	Nana Akwasi Denkyi Agyekum	Elected
Ashanti	Kwadaso Municipal	Eric Asibey	Elected
Ashanti	Old Tafo	Sahmudeen Mohammed Kamil	Unopposed
Ashanti	Suame	Frank Owusu Ansah	Elected
Ashanti	Asokwa	Amoh Kamel	Elected
Ashanti	Oforikrom	Anwel Sadat Ahmed	Elected
Ashanti	Asawase	Mohammed Mubarak Muntaka	Elected
Ashanti	Kwabre East	Frederick Sarfo-Asante	Elected
Ashanti	Afigya Kwabre South	Vivien Nyuzagla Muzagl	Elected
Ashanti	Afigya Kwabre North	Emmanuel Jackson Agumah	Elected
Ashanti	Juaben	Eunice Ohenewaa Ansu	Elected
Ashanti	Ejisu	Jerryne Asante	Elected
Ashanti	Asante Akim South	Maame Sarfoah Appiah	Elected
Ashanti	Asante Akim Central	Ebenezer Ekow Aidoo	Unopposed
Ashanti	Asante Akim North	Edward Kofi Asamoah	Elected
Ashanti	Effiduase/Asokore	Raymond Opoku Agyeman	Elected
Ashanti	Kumawu	Kwasi Amankwaa	Unopposed
Ashanti	Sekyere Afram Plains	Hajia Nasira Afrah	Elected
Ashanti	Nsuta/Kwamang/Beposo	Ofori Atta Aboagye	Elected
Ashanti	Mampong	Yakubu Issifu	No Elections Yet
Ashanti	Ejura Sekyedumase	Muhammad Bawah Braimah	Elected
Ashanti	Afigya Seyere East	Twumasi Evans Amoh	Elected
Ashanti	Offinso South	Asare Bediako Vincent	Elected
Ashanti	Offinso North	Ceasar Ofosu Acheampong	Elected
Ashanti	Ahafo Ano South West	Sadik Abubakar	Elected
Ashanti	Ahafo Ano South- East	Mohammed Yakubu	Elected
Ashanti	Ahafo Ano North	Kwasi Adusei	Elected

Greater Accra

Region	Constituency	Name of aspirant	Remarks
Greater Accra	Bortianor- Ngleshie Amanfro	Felix Akwetey Okle	Elected
Greater Accra	Domeabra-Obom	Isaac Awuku Yibor	Elected
Greater Accra	Weija-Gbawe	Felix Odartey Lamptey	Elected
Greater Accra	Anyaa/Sowutuom	Emmanuel Adotey Allotey	Elected
Greater Accra	Trobu	John Kofi Halm	Elected
Greater Accra	Amasaman	Sedem Kweku Afenyo	Elected
Greater Accra	Dome/Kwabenya	Faustina Elikplim Akurugu	Elected
Greater Accra	Madina	Francis Xavier Sosu	Unopposed
Greater Accra	Ayawaso East	Naser Mahama Toure	Elected
Greater Accra	Ayawaso North	Yussif Issaka Jajah	Elected
Greater Accra	Ayawaso Central	Abdul Rauf Tongym Tubazu	Elected
Greater Accra	Ayawaso West Wuogon	John Dumelo	Unopposed
Greater Accra	Okaikwei South	Ernest Adomako	Elected
Greater Accra	Ablekuma South	Okoe Vanderpuije	Unopposed
Greater Accra	Odododiodioo	Alfred Nii Kotei Ashie	Elected
Greater Accra	Okaikwei Central	Baba Sadiq Abdulai Abu	Elected
Greater Accra	Okaikwei North	Theresa Awuni	Unopposed
Greater Accra	Ablekuma North	Ewurabena Aubynn	Elected
Greater Accra	Ablekuma Central	Abdul-Latif Dan	Elected
Greater Accra	Ablekuma West	Kweku Addo	Elected
Greater Accra	Korle Klottey	Zanetor Agyeman- Rawlings	Elected
Greater Accra	Dadekotopon	Rita Naa Odoley Sowah	Elected
Greater Accra	Ledzokuku	Benjamin Narteh Ayiku	Elected
Greater Accra	Krowor	Agnes Naa Momo Lartey	Elected
Greater Accra	Tema East	Isaac Ashai Odamtten	Elected
Greater Accra	Tema Central	Ebi Bright	Elected
Greater Accra	Tema West	James Enu	Elected
Greater Accra	Kpone-Katamanso	Joseph Akuerteh Tettey	Elected
Greater Accra	Ashaiman	Ernest Henry Norgbey	Elected
Greater Accra	Adentan	Mohammed Adamu Ramadan	Elected
Greater Accra	Shai-Osudoku	Linda Akweley Obenewaa Ocloo	Elected
Greater Accra	Ningo Prampram	Samuel Nartey George	Elected
Greater Accra	Sege	Daniel Keshi Bessey	Elected
Greater Accra	Ada	Comfort Doyoe Cudjoe	Elected

Volta

S/N	Constituency	Name of Aspirant	Remarks
1	North Tongu	Samuel Okudzeto Ablakwa	Unopposed
2	Central Tongu	Alexander Roosevelt Hottordze	Elected
3	South Tongu	Maxwell Kwame Lukutor	Elected
4	Anlo	Richard Kwame Sefe	Elected
	Keta	Kwame Dzudzorli Gakpey	Elected
7	Akatsi North	Peter Nortsu Kotoe	Elected
8	Ketu South	Abla Dzifa Gomashie	Elected
9	Ketu North	Edem Agbana	Elected
10	Agortime Ziope	Charles Agbeve	Unopposed
11	Adaklu	Kwame Governs Agbodza	Elected
12	Ho Central	Edem Kofi Kpotosu	Elected
	Ho West	Emmanuel Kwasi Bedzrah	
14	Afadzato South	Frank Afriyie	Elected
15	South Dayi	Rochson -Nelson Etse Kwami Dafeamekpor	Elected
16	North Dayi	Joycelyn Tetteh	Elected
17	Kpando	Sebastian Fred Deh	Elected
18	Hohoe	Thomas Worlanyo Tsekpo	Elected

Oti

Region	Constituency	Name of aspirant	Remarks
Oti	Buem	Adams Iddie Kofi	Elected
Oti	Biakoye	Jean-Marie Formadi	Elected
Oti	Akan	Yao Gomado	Elected
Oti	Krachi East	Nelson Kofi Djabab	Elected
Oti	Krachi West	Helen Adjoa Ntoso	Elected
Oti	Krachi Nchumuru	Solomon Kuyon	Elected
Oti	Nkwanta South	Geofferey Kini	Elected
Oti	Nkwanta North	John Oti Bless	Elected
Oti	Guan	Agbenyo Fred Kwesi	Elected

Western North

Region	Constituency	Name of aspirant	Ballot Position
Western North	Aowin	Oscar Ofori Larbi	Elected
Western North	Suaman	Joseph Bentino	Unopposed
Western North	Bibiani-Anhwiaso- Bekwai	Bright Asamoah Brefo	Elected
Western North	Sefwi Wiawso	Kofi Benteh Afful	Elected
Western North	Sefwi Akontombra		No Election Yet
Western North	Juaboso	Kwabena Mintah Akandoh	Unopposed
Western North	Bodi	Sampson Ahi	Unopposed
Western North	Bia West	Mustapha Amadu Tanko	Elected
Western North	Bia East	Richard Acheampong	Unopposed

Bono

Region	Constituency	Name of aspirant	Remarks
Bono	Sunyani East	Seid Mubarak	Elected
Bono	Sunyani West		No Elections Yet
Bono	Dormaa West	Vincent Oppong Asamoah	Elected
Bono	Dormaa Central	John Kwame Adu Jack	Elected
Bono	Dormaa East	Rachel Owusuah	Elected
Bono	Berekum East	Simon Ampaabeng Kyeremeh	Elected
Bono	Berekum West	Dickson Kyere-Duah	Elected
Bono	Jaman South	Williams Okofo-Dateh	Unopposed
Bono	Jaman North	Frederick Yaw Ahenkwah	Unopposed
Bono	Banda	Ahmed Ibrahim	Unopposed
Bono	Tain	Sulemana Adama	Elected
Bono	Wenchi	Haruna Seidu	Unopposed

North-East

Region	Constituency	Name of aspirants	Remarks
North East	Walewale	Fuseini Musah Abubakari Abdallah Jamaldeen Tonzua Seidu Hamisu Shaibu	Elected
North East	Yagaba/ Kubori	Abu Iddrisu Rashid Ibrahim Mohammed Ali Musah Sibiri Hamidu Shaibu Baanni Azumah	Elected
North East	Nalerigu / Gambaga	Issifu Seidu Adam Imoro	Elected
North East	Bunkpurugu	Moisob Ambrose Binyoi Bandim Azumah Abed-Nego Tahidu Jagong Alhassan Lambongang	Elected
North East	Yunyoo	Naabu Joseph Bipoba Bouri Samuel Poyari Alhassan Sulemana	Elected
North East	Chereponi	Yakubu Seidu A. Kalanba Sulemana Issifu Frinjei Seidu Alhassan Alajor Alaza Labaram	Elected

Western Region

Region	Constituency	Name of aspirant	Remarks
Western	Jomoro	Dorcas Toffey	Elected
Western	Ellembele	Emmanuel Armah-Kofi Buah	Unopposed
Western	Evalue Ajomoro Gwira		No Elections Yet
Western	Ahanta West	Mavis Kuukua Bissue	Elected
Western	Takoradi	Frederick Faustinus Faidoo	Elected
Western	Sekondi	Nyameke Blay Armah	Elected
Western	Essikadu-Ketan	Grace Ayensu-Danquah	Elected
Western	Effia	Abdul Majeed Iddrisu Nassam	Elected
Western	Kwesimintsim	Lawyer Philip Fiifi Buckman	Unopposed
Western	Shama	Amelia Arthur	Elected
Western	Wassa East	Isaac Adjei Mensah	Unopposed
Western	Mpohor		No Elections Yet
Western	Tarkwa Nsuaem		No Elections Yet
Western	Prestea Huni- Valley	Robert Wisdom Cudjoe	Unopposed
Western	Amenfi East		No Elections Yet
Western	Amenfi Central	Joana Gyan Cudjoe	Elected

Western	Amenfi West	Eric Afful	Elected

Eastern Region

Region	Constituency	Name of aspirant	Remarks
Eastern	Asuogyaman	Thomas Ampem Nyarko	Elected
Eastern	Lower Manya Krobo	Ebenezer Okletey Terlabi	Elected
Eastern	Upper Manya Krobo	Nyarko Bismark Tetteh	Elected
Eastern	Yilo Krobo	Albert Tetteh Nyakotey	Elected
Eastern	New Juaben South	Martin Otu Offei	Elected
Eastern	New Juaben North	Adongo Samuel	Elected
Eastern	Akropong		No Elections Yet
Eastern	Okere	Prince Henry Anim Owiredu	Elected
Eastern	Akuapem South	Lawrencia Dziwornu	Elected
Eastern	Nsawam/Adoagyiri	Femmey Philibert Amenorpe	Elected
Eastern	Suhum	Prince Kwadwo Addo Tabiri	Elected
Eastern	Ayensuano		No Elections Yet
Eastern	Lower West Akim		No Elections Yet
Eastern	Upper West Akim	Drah Emmanuel	Elected
Eastern	Akim Oda	Jones Asante	Unopposed
Eastern	Asene/Manso/Akroso	Eric Ahinakwa	Unopposed
Eastern	Birim South	Taaju Abdul Rahim	Unopposed
Eastern	Achiase	Samuel Owusu Brako	Unopposed
Eastern	Ofoase/Ayirebi	Alfred Osei-Poku	Elected
Eastern	Kade	Emmanuel Kofi Nti	Elected
Eastern	Akwatia		No Elections Yet
Eastern	Abirem	Nurudeen Mohammed Fuseini	Ele Cted
Eastern	Abuakwa South	Nana Adu Sarpong Addo-Aikins	Unopposed

Eastern	Abuakwa North	Boateng Edgar Asamoah Richard Agyekum Asare Charles Darko Yeboah	No Elections Yet
Eastern	Atiwa West	Ofosuapea Dennis Owusu-Appiah	Elected
Eastern	Atiwa East	Kenneth Agyare	Elected
Eastern	Fanteakwa North	Apaw-Wiredu Haroun	Elected
Eastern	Fanteakwa South	Owusu Kingsley Newman	Elected
Eastern	Nkawkaw	Frederick Somuah Obeng	Unopposed
Eastern	Mpraeso	Muhayadeen Adams Kaleem	Unopposed
Eastern	Abetifi	Isaac Amoafo Addo	Elected
Eastern	Kwahu Afram Plains North	Mensah Krosbi Betty	Elected
Eastern	Afram Plains South		No Elections Yet
Eastern	Akuapem North	John Evans Kumordzi	Elected

Savannah Region

Region	Constituency	Name of aspirant	Ballot Positions
Savannah	Bole-Bamboi	Yusif Sulemana	Elected
Savannah	Sawla-Tuna-Kalba	Andrew Dari Chiwitey	Elected
Savannah	Damongo	Adam Mutawakilu	Elected
Savannah	Daboya / Mankarigu	Shaibu Mahama	Elected
Savannah	Yapei/Kusawgu	John Abdulai Jinapor	Unopposed
Savannah	Salaga South	Zuwera Mohammed Ibrahimah	Elected
Savannah	Salaga North	Alhassan Mumuni	Elected

Ahafo

Region	Constituency	Name of aspirant	Remarks
Ahafo	Asunafo South		No Elections Yet

Ahafo	Asunafo North		No Elections Yet
Ahafo	Asutifi South	Collins Dauda	Unopposed
Ahafo	Asutifi North	Ebenezer Kwaku Addo	Elected
Ahafo	Tano South	Charles Asiedu	Elected
Ahafo	Tano North		No Elections Yet

Upper West Region

Region	Constituency	Name of aspirant	Remarks
Upper West	Wa Central	Abdul-Rashid Hassan Pelpuo	Elected
Upper West	Wa West	Peter Lancehe Toobu	Elected
Upper West	Wa East	Godfred Seidu Jasaw	Elected
Upper West	Nadowli/Kaleo	Sumah Mwinkaara Anthony	Elected
Upper West	Daffiama/Bussie/Issa	Sebastain Ngmenenso Sandaare	Elected
Upper West	Jirapa	Cletus Seidu Dapilah	Elected
Upper West	Lambussie	Titus Kofi Beyuo	Elected
Upper West	Lawra	Bede Anwataazumo Ziedeng	Elected
Upper West	Nandom	Richard Kuuire	Elected
Upper West	Sissala West	Mohammed Adams Sukparu	Elected
Upper West	Sissala East	2.Mohammed Issah Bataglia	Elected

Central Region

No.	Name of Aspirant(S)	Remarks
1	Assin Central
1	Nurien Shaibu Migyimah	Unopposed

2	Hemang Lower Dnekyira
2	Seth Agyapong Mensah	Elected
3	Cape Coast North
3	Kwamena Minta Nyarku	Elected
4	Agona East
4	Sawyer Queenstar Pokuah	Unopposed
5	Ajumako Enyan Essiyam
5	Cassiel Ato Baah Forson	Unopposed
6	Assin South

	Stephen Kofi Baidoo	Elected
7	Asikuma Odoben Brakwa
7	Alhassan Kobina Ghanasah	Elected
8	Gomoa West
8	Richard Gyan - Mensah	Elected
9	Ekumfi
9	Ekow Othniel Kwainoe	Elected
10	Agona West
10	Ernestina Ofori Dangbey	Elected
11	Awutu Senya West
11	Gizella Akushika Tetteh- Agbotui	Unopposed
12	Cape Coast South
12	George Kweku Ricketts- Hagan	Elected
13	Abura Asebu Kwamankese
13	Felix Kwakye Ofosu	Elected
14	Gomoa East
14	Desmond De-Graft Paitoo	Elected
15	Upper Denkyira East
15	Lawyer Emelia Ankomah	Unopposed

16	Mfantseman
16	Ebenezer Prince Arhin	Elected
17	Upper Denkyira West
17	Lawyer Daniel Ohene Darko	Unopposed
18	Komenda/Edina/Eguafu/Abriam
18	Samuel Atta Mills	Elected
19	Awutu Senya East
19	Phillis Naa Koryoo Okunor	Elected
20	Twifo Atti Morkwa
20	David Theophilus Dominic Vondee	Elected

Bono East

No	Region	Constituency	Name of aspirant	Remarks
1	Bono East	Techiman South	Christopher Baasongti Beyere	Elected
2	Bono East	Kintampo North	Joseph Kwame Kumah	Elected
3	Bono East	Kintampo South	Felicia Adjei	Elected
4	Bono East	Nkoranza North	Joseph Kwasi Mensah	Elected
5	Bono East	Nkoranza South	Emmanuel Kojo Agyekum	Unopposed
6	Bono East	Atebubu/Amantin	Sanja Nanja	Elected
7	Bono East	Pru West	Emmanuel K. Ntekuni	Elected
8	Bono East	Pru East	Emmanuel Kwaku Boam	Elected
9	Bono East	Sene West	Kwame Twumasi Ampofo	Elected
10	Bono East	Sene East	Dominic Napare	Elected
11	Bono East	Techiman North	Elizabeth Ofosu Adjare	Elected
