= Nii Oakley Quaye-Kumah =

Ghanaian politician

Hon. Nii Oakley Quaye-Kumah

Member of the Ghana Parliament for Krowor Constituency
- In office 7 January 2009 – 6 January 2017
- Preceded by: Abraham Laryea Odai
- Succeeded by: Elizabeth Afoley Quaye

Personal details
- Born: 26 September 1959 (age 66) Ghana
- Died: 6th March,2023
- Party: National Democratic Congress
- Occupation: Politician
- Profession: Veterinary Surgeon

Nii Oakley Quaye-Kumah is a Ghanaian politician and a Veterinary Surgeon. He was the member of parliament for the Krowor Constituency from 7 January 2009 to 6 January 2017. He was also the chief executive officer of a number of veterinary hospitals.

== Early life and education ==
Quaye-Kumah was born on 26 September 1959. He hails from Nungua, in the Greater Accra Region of Ghana. He obtained his Master of Veterinary Science from a university in Ukraine in 1989.

== Career ==
Quaye-Kumah is a Veterinary Surgeon. Prior to entering politics, he was the chief executive officer of Beach Animal Hospital in Nungua and Westland Animal Hospital in West Legon, Accra.

== Politics ==
Quaye-Kumah entered parliament on 7 January 2009 on the ticket of the National Democratic Congress (NDC) representing the Krowor Constituency. He was re-elected to represent the constituency for a second consecutive term during the 2012 Ghanaian general election but was unable to contest for the seat for a third consecutive time due to poor health. He was replaced by Agnes Naa Momo Lartey who contested the seat for the NDC during the 2016 Ghanaian general election but lost to Elizabeth Afoley Quaye of the New Patriotic Party.

== Personal life ==
Quaye-Kumah is married with six children. He identifies as a Christian and a member of the International Central Gospel Church (ICGC).
