= Kpledjoo Festival =

Festival in Ghana by the Tema people

The Kpledjoo Festival is an annual harvest festival celebrated by the chiefs and peoples of Tema in the Greater Accra Region of Ghana. It is usually celebrated in late March or first week in April.

The festival has been celebrated for generations and originated before the colonial period. It is closely linked to the traditional religion and farming practices of the Tema people. Kpledjoo marks the beginning of the farming season, especially the planting of maize, which is later followed the Homowo Festival after the harvest.

The name is derived from two Ga words. "Kple", referring to a traditional Ga religion centered on the Supreme Being, and "Joo" meaning dance or performance. Thus, Kpledjoo literally ,means "Kple dance" or "Kple performance". The festival combines ritual, music, dance, drumming, spirit possession, and communal ceremonies that reaffirm the cultural identity and history of the Tema people.

Unlike Homowo, which celebrates a successful harvest, Kpledjoo serves as a period of spiritual preparation for the farming season. Traditional priests and priestesses perform sacred rites to invoke the blessings of the gods and ancestors for rainfall, fertility, peace, and a bumper harvest. These rituals are closely linked to the sacred Sakumo Lagoon, which has long been regarded as an important spiritual and ecological resource for the Tema community.

== Celebration ==
It is celebrated to facilitate the recovery of the Sakumo Lagoon for high yield during harvest. There is a 5-month temporary ban on trapping of crabs and fishing from the lagoon before the festival.

Before the public are allowed access to the lagoon, the priest of the Sakumo lagoon performs some rituals on the banks.

During the grand-durbar, there is merry-making and hugs from the chiefs and the inhabitants.

== Significance ==
The Kpledjoo Festival serves several important cultural, religious, and social functions. It marks the beginning of the farming season, particularly the planting of maize, and provides an opportunity for the people to seek blessings from the gods and ancestors for rainfall, fertility, peace, and a successful harvest. The festival also reinforces the traditional religious beliefs and practices of the Ga people while promoting unity, reconciliation, and a shared cultural identity among the people of Tema. In addition, it supports environmental conservation through the temporary closure of the Sakumo Lagoon to fishing and crab harvesting before the festival, allowing the ecosystem to recover and preserving its ecological and spiritual importance.
