= Emmanuel Adjei Boye =

Ghanaian politician

Hon. Emmanuel Adjei Boye

Member of Parliament for Krowor Constituency
- In office 7 January 2001 – 6 January 2005
- President: John Kufuor

Personal details
- Party: New Patriotic Party
- Profession: Politician

Emmanuel Adjei Boye is a Ghanaian politician and was the member of parliament for the Krowor constituency in the Greater Accra region of Ghana. He was a member of parliament in the 3rd parliament of the 4th republic of Ghana.

== Politics ==
Boye is a member of the New Patriotic Party. He was elected as the member of parliament for the Krowor constituency in the Greater Accra region in the 3rd parliament of the 4th republic of Ghana. He was succeeded by Abraham Laryea Odai in the 2004 Ghanaian General elections. He was a Former Deputy Minister for Roads and Transport.

== Elections ==
Boye was elected as the member of parliament for the Krowor constituency in the 2000 Ghanaian general elections. He was elected on the ticket of the New Patriotic Party. His constituency was a part of the 16 parliamentary seats out of 22 seats won by the New Patriotic Party in that election for the Greater Accra Region. The New Patriotic Party won a majority total of 100 parliamentary seats out of 200 seats in the 3rd parliament of the 4th republic of Ghana. He was elected with 14,275 votes out of 30,798 total valid votes cast. This was equivalent to 46.5% of the total valid votes cast. He was elected over Joshua Alabi of the National Democratic Congress, Seth Nakai-Akee Bortier, Theophilus M. Boye of the Convention People's Party, Joseph Nii- Anum Kpakpo of the People's National Convention and Kudoto Egypt of the United Ghana Movement. These obtained 12,973, 2,234, 739, 395 and 86 votes respectively out of the total valid votes cast. These were equivalent to 42.3%, 7.3%, 2.4%, 1.3 and 0.3% respectively of total valid votes cast.
