= Teshie-Nungua =

- District Capital
- Location in Ghana
- Coordinates: 5°35′N 0°5′W
- Country: Ghana
- Region: Greater Accra Region
- District: Ledzokuku-Krowor Municipal District

Teshie-Nungua is a small town and is the capital of Ledzokuku-Krowor Municipal district, a district in the Greater Accra Region of Ghana. Teshie is a town on its own and different from Nungua. The town shares boundaries with Sakumono, Lashibi and Tema.
