= Teshie =

- Town
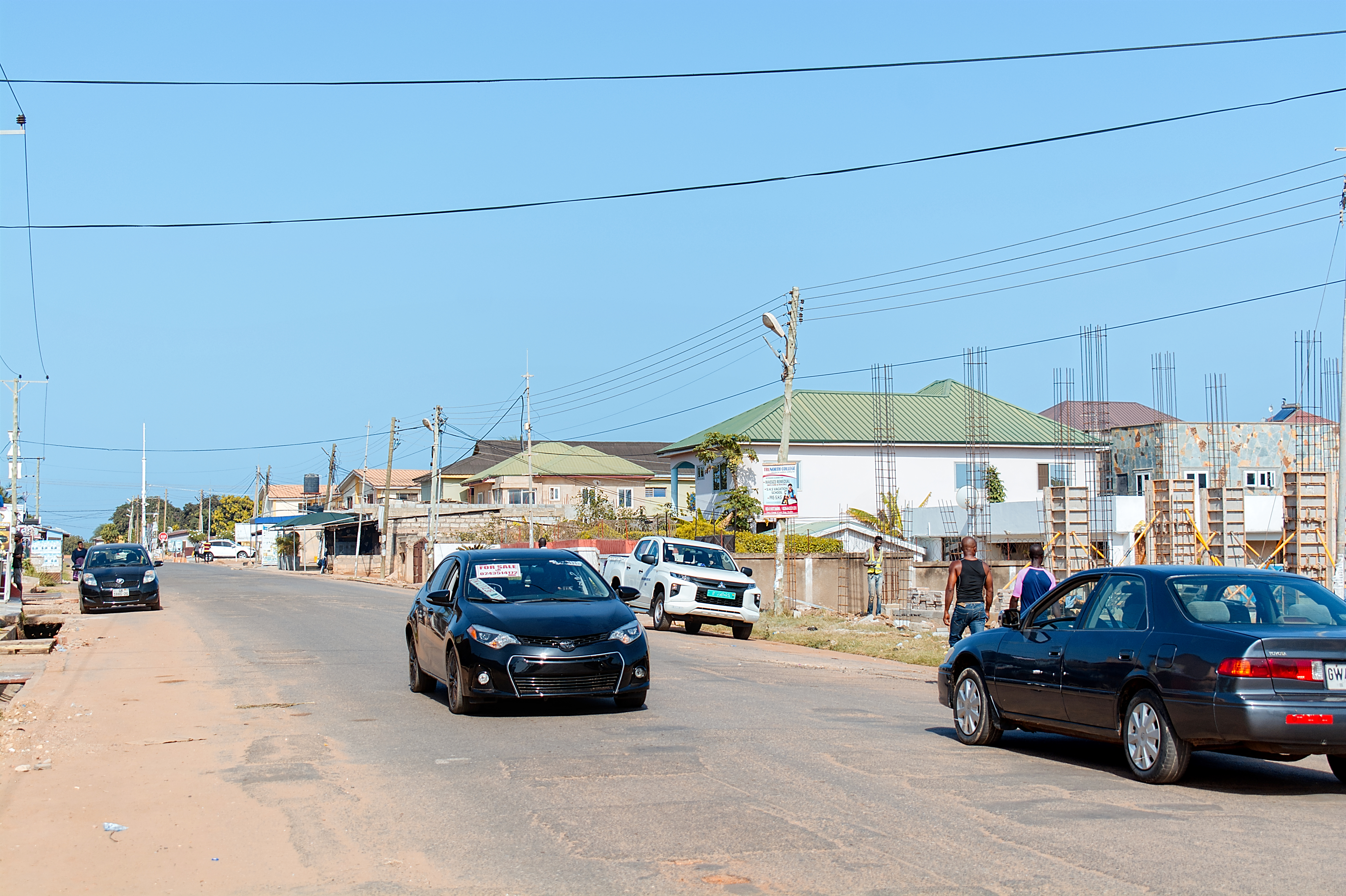
- A neighborhood in Teshie

- Location in Ghana
- Coordinates: 5°35′N 0°06′W
- Country: Ghana
- Region: Greater Accra Region
- District: Ledzokuku-Krowor Municipal District

Population (2012)
  - Total: 171,875
- Ranked 9th in Ghana
- Time zone: GMT
  - Summer (DST): GMT

Teshie is a coastal town in the Ledzokuku Municipal District, a district in the Greater Accra Region of southeastern Ghana. Teshie is the ninth most populous settlement in Ghana, with a population of 171,875 people.

== Politics ==
Teshie is in the Ledzokuku constituency led by Hon. Ben Ayiku, a member of the National Democratic Congress, who succeeded Hon. Dr Bernard Okoe Boye of the New Patriotic Party.Benita Sena Okity-Duah defeated candidates like former MCE Daniel Amartey Mensah and former MP Nii Nortey Dua to win the 2015 Ledzokuku Parliamentary primary with 62% of the legitimate vote.

== Traditions ==
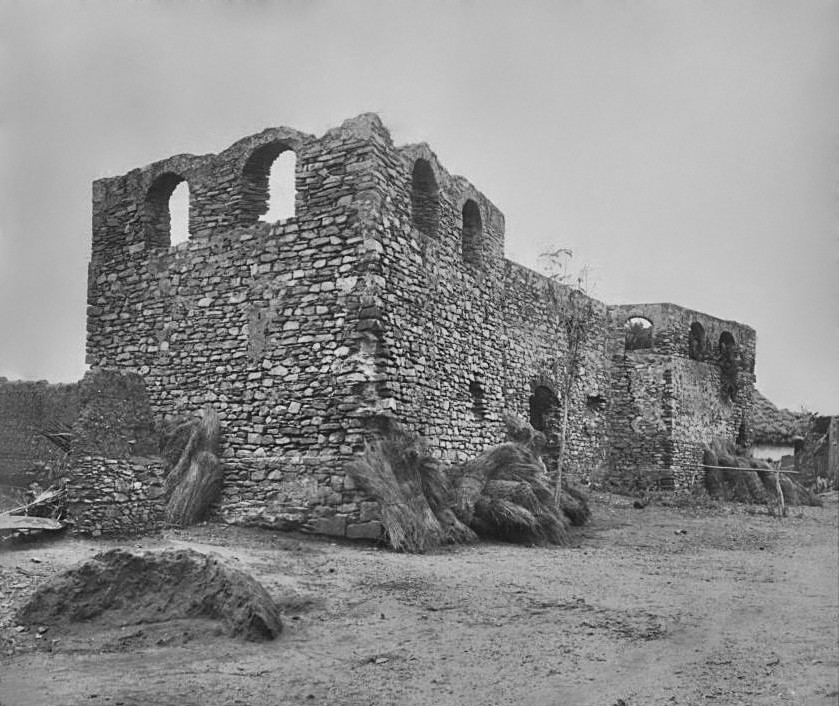
The ruines of Fort Augustaborg in Teshie around 1890

Teshie is one of the independent towns of the Ga State, every August, the town celebrates the Homowo festival. It is believed that the original Teshie people came from La, a town that lies to the west of Teshie.

Fort Augustaborg, built by the Danes in 1787, is located in Teshie and was occupied by the British from 1850 to 1957. It is believed that Teshie is 300 years old as of 2011.

Teshie stretches from the Kpeshie Lagoon to Teshie-Nungua Estates (first junction) from East to West on the Teshie Road. Teshie has grown enormously to become one of the biggest towns in Ghana.

The locals claim that the deteriorating status of the roads in Greda Estates, Tsuibleoo, Teshie Lascala, and other neighborhoods has a significant negative impact on their daily commute and calls for immediate action. The Greater Accra Region Minister, Henry Quartey, and the Registrar of the Greater Accra Regional House of Chiefs, Enoch Addo, have been warned by the chiefs and traditional leaders of Teshie, an Accra suburb, to refrain from meddling in Teshie's chieftaincy concerns.

== Kane Kwei Carpentry Workshop ==
The town of Teshie is also known as the home of design coffins, invented in the 1950s by Seth Kane Kwei and still made in the Kane Kwei Carpentry Workshop (run by Eric Adjetey Anang) and by several other artists.

== Notable sites ==
=== Labadi Beach ===
The Labadi Beach, or more properly known as La Pleasure Beach, is near Teshie. The beach is the busiest beach on Ghana's coast. It is one of Greater Accra Region's few beaches and is maintained by the local hotels.

=== Fort Augustaborg ===
The Fort Augustaborg was built in 1787 when Denmark occupied Ghana, and from 1850 until Ghana's independence, it was governed by the British. It is currently in a destroyed state.

== Schools ==
=== Tertiary ===
- Nursing and Midwifery Training College, Teshie
- Family Health University College, Nursing & Midwifery School
- Kofi Annan International Peacekeeping Training Centre (KAIPTC)
- Ghana Military Academy Training School.

=== Secondary ===
- Presbyterian Senior High School, Teshie
- Teshie Technical Training Centre
- O'Reilly Senior High School
- Saint Johns Senior High School
- Teshie Technical Training School (TTTC)
- Anglican Senior High School

== Transport ==
=== Road ===
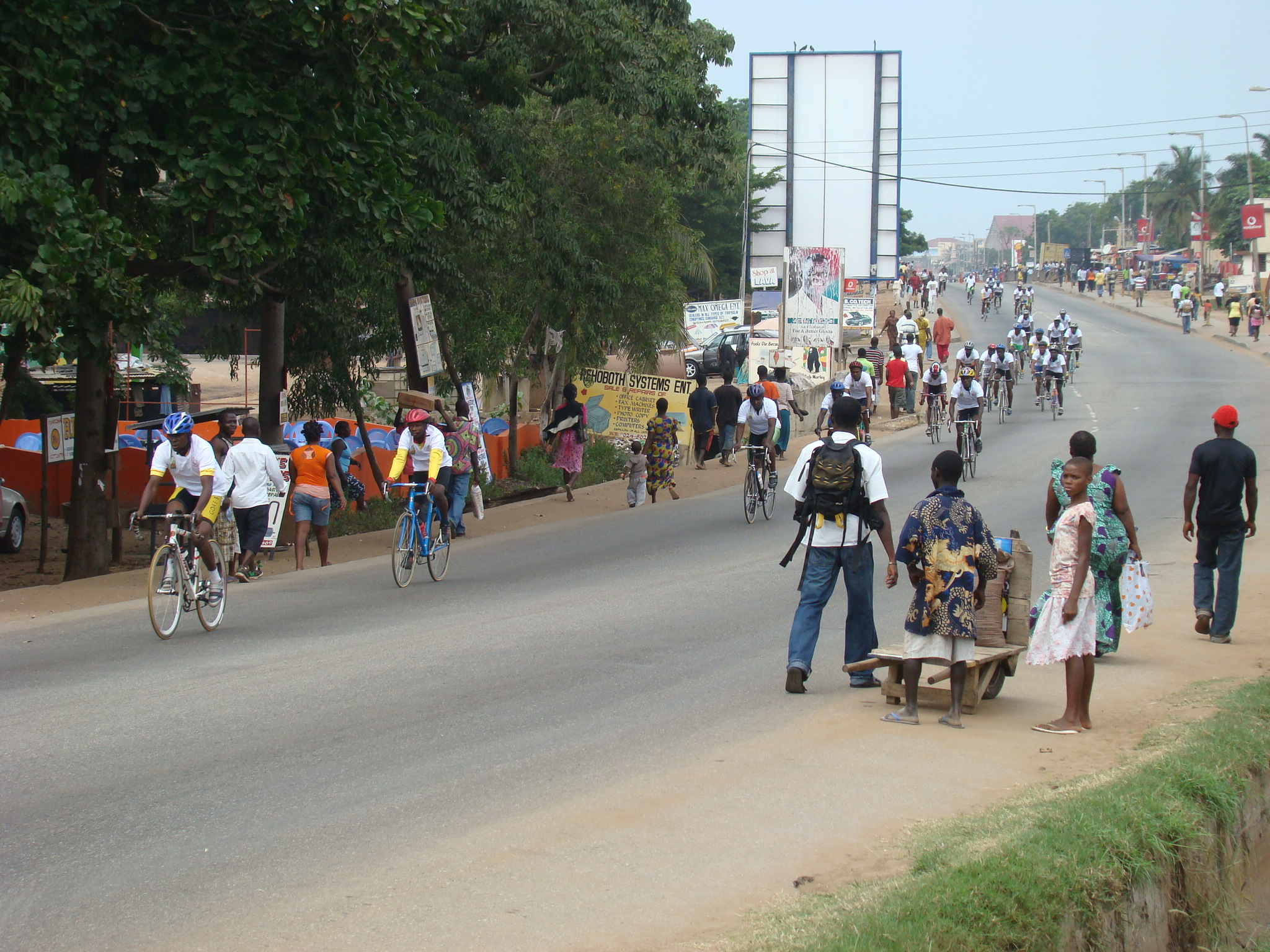
Cycling competition in Teshie during Homowo Festival 2009

The widening of the dual carriage way from OTU Barracks to First Junction was in the late 1970s.

=== Train ===
Teshie is served by a station of the eastern section of the national railway system.

== See also ==
- Railway stations in Ghana

== Publications ==
- 2013 Master of Coffins – 26 minutes documentary about artist Eric Adjetey Anang, by Luis Nachbin / Matrioska Films for GloboTV (Brazil)
- 2008 The Buried Treasures of the Ga: Coffin Art in Ghana. Regula Tschumi. Benteli, Bern. ISBN 978-3-7165-1520-4

== International exhibitions ==
- 2011/12.Sainsbury Centre of Visual Arts, Griff Rhys Jones' Ghanaian 'fantasy coffin'
- 2011/12. Miracles of Africa, Hämeenlinna Art Museum, Hämeenlinna and Oulu Museum of Art, Oulu, Finland
