= Elizabeth Afoley Quaye =

Ghanaian politician

Hon. Elizabeth Afoley Quaye MP

Member of the Ghana Parliament for Krowor Constituency
- In office 7 January 2017 – 6 January 2021
- Preceded by: Nii Oakley Quaye-Kumah
- Succeeded by: Agnes Naa Momo Lartey

Personal details
- Born: 1 November 1970 (age 55) Nungua, Ghana
- Party: New Patriotic Party
- Children: 4
- Education: Central University, Accra, Ghana
- Occupation: Agriculturist
- Profession: Agriculturist

Elizabeth Afoley Quaye (born 1970), is a former Member of Parliament for Krowor constituency in Greater Accra region Ghana. She is also a former Minister for Fisheries and Aquaculture.

== Education ==
Elizabeth holds a Bachelor of Science degree in Agribusiness from the Central University College. She obtained a National Diploma in General Agriculture from the University of Ghana, and also a certificate in General Agriculture from the Kwadaso Agricultural College.

== Career ==
Elizabeth has worked with Ministry of Food and Agriculture as Principal Production Officer for 20 years. She is the member of parliament for krowor constituency she is also the Minister designate for Fisheries and Aquaculture.

== Politics ==
Afoley Quaye contested and won the New Patriotic Party parliamentary elections for the Krowor Constituency in the Greater Accra Region in 2015. During the 2016 Ghanaian general elections, she won this same parliamentary seat to become the Member of Parliament for the Krowor Constituency. She contested with three other candidates, namely Agnes Naa Momo Lartey of the National Democratic Congress, Hugo Kofi Huppenbauer of the Progressive People's Party and Amartey Fanny of the Convention People's Party. Afoley Quaye won the elections with 32,463 votes out of 63,555 votes cast, representing 51.08 percent of total valid votes.

She is contested in the 2020 Ghanaian general election as the parliamentary candidate for the New Patriotic Party and lost to Agnes Naa Momo Lartey of the National Democratic Congress who she faced also in the 2016 elections (NDC)

== Personal life ==
She is married with four children. She identifies as a Christian.
