= Eddie Akita =

Ghanaian politician

Hon. Dr Edward Martey Akita
- In office 7 January 2001 – 6 January 2005
- Constituency: Ledzokuku

Member of Parliament
- President: John Agyekum Kuffour

Personal details
- Party: New Patriotic Party

Eddie Akita is a Ghanaian politician and a member of the 3rd Parliament of the 4th Republic of Ghana. He is also a former member of Parliament for Ledzokuku constituency of the Greater Accra Region of Ghana. Akita once served as Deputy Minister of Defence as well as a Minister of state in charge of fisheries in Ghana.

== Early life ==
Akita hails from Ledzokuku in the greater Accra Region of Ghana.

== Politics ==
Akita is a member of the 3rd Parliament and a politician of the New Patriotic Party who served for only one term in office. He contested in the 2000 Ghanaian general elections and won with 21,082 making 48.40% of the total votes cast. He lost in the delegate election of the New Patriotic Party and hence was not qualified to contest in the 2004 Ghanaian general elections.
