= Nii Adjei-Boye Sekan =

Ghanaian politician

Member of parliament for Ledzokuku Constituency
- In office 7 January 1993 – 6 January 2001
- President: Jerry John Rawlings

Personal details
- Born: 9 January 1959
- Died: 6 August 2006 (aged 47) Korle Bu Teaching Hospital
- Party: National Democratic Congress
- Occupation: Administrator

Nii Adjei-Boye Sekan is a Ghanaian former politician and a member of the 2nd parliament of the 4th republic of Ghana representing Ledzokuku Constituency under the membership of the National Democratic Congress (NDC).

== Early life ==
Sekan was born on 9 January 1959, in the Greater Accra Region of Ghana. He obtained his Master of Science degree in Social Science from Cuba. He worked as an administrator for years and later went into politics. He also lived as a Christian throughout his life.

== Political career ==
He was elected into the first parliament of the fourth republic of Ghana on 7 January 1993, after he was pronounced winner at the 1992 Ghanaian parliamentary election held on 29 December 1992.

Sekan was thereafter re-elected into parliament on 7 January 1997, after he was pronounced winner at the 1996 Ghanaian General Elections having defeated Ben Ablorh Annan of the New Patriotic Party, Seth Adjei Sowah of the Convention People's Party, Mary Bernice Sowah of the National Independence Party and Ebenezer William Armah-Oblie of the National Independence Party. He obtained 38.90% of the total valid votes cast which is equivalent to 24,776 votes. He was defeated at the 2000 Ghanaian General Election by Eddie Akita of the New Patriotic Party who obtained 48.40% of the total valid votes which is equivalent to 21,082 votes while Sekan obtained 34.40% which is equivalent to 14,981 votes.

== Death ==
Nii Adjei-Boye Sekan died on 6 August 2006 at the Korle Bu Teaching Hospital aged 47.
