= Sakumono =

- Town
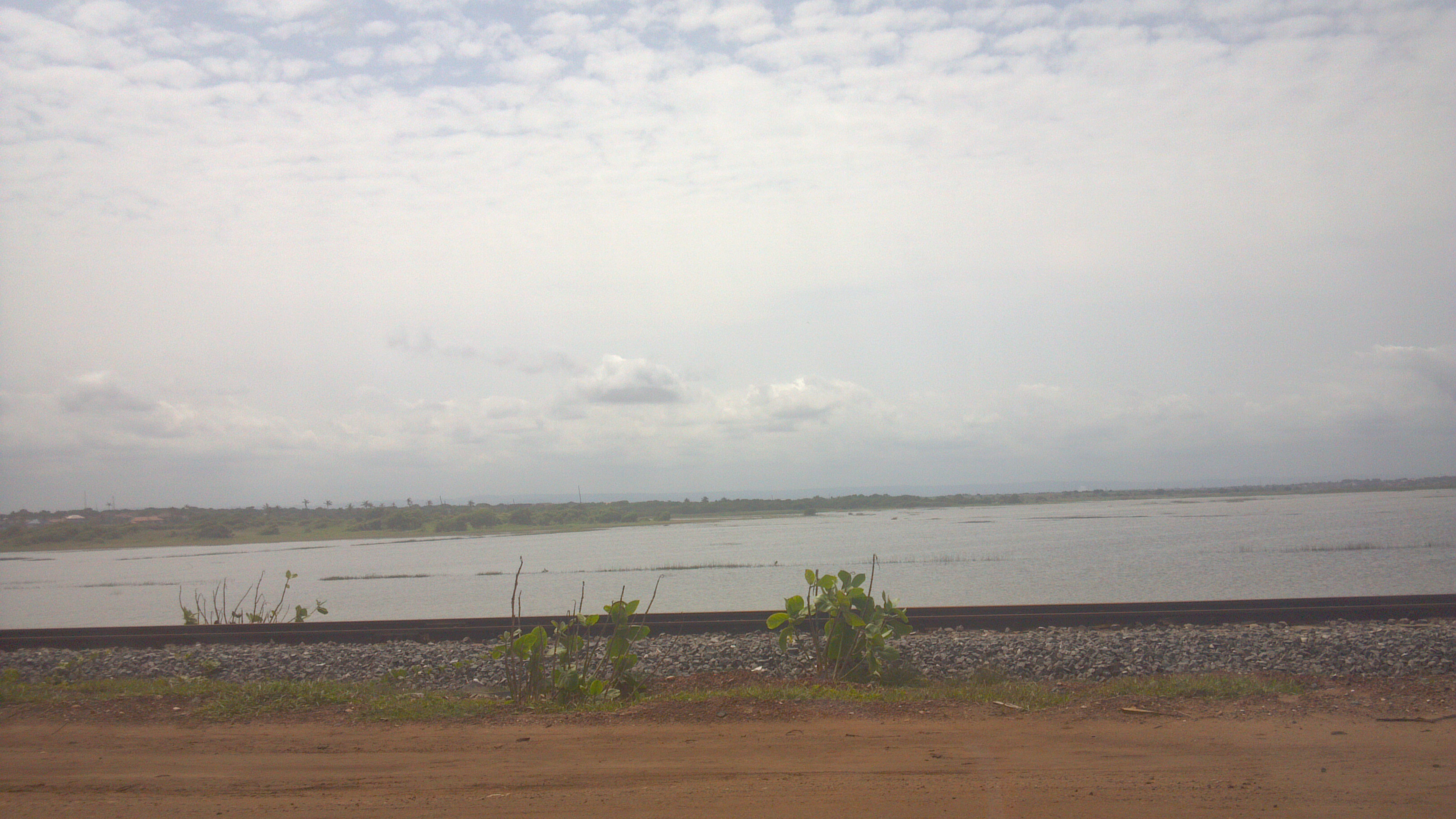

- Location in Ghana
- Coordinates: 05°37′00″N 00°03′00″W
- Country: Ghana
- Region: Greater Accra Region
- District: Tema Metropolitan District
- Elevation: 233 ft (71 m)

Sakumono is a small town before Nungua from Ashaiman. It is in the Tema Metropolitan district, a district in the Greater Accra Region of Ghana. It was originally a small fishing village on Sakumono Lagoon, but by 2008 was being swallowed up as the twin cities of Nungua and Tema were merging. Its elevation is 71m. Sakumono, also known as Community 13, is one of the interesting towns in the area, with the main township being close to the beach and the lagoon. It also has several sectors of Estate buildings and jurisdiction. Sakumono has a Ramsar site.

== Sakumono Ramsar site ==
Sakumono has a Ramsar Site, and people have built around the site blocking water passages which leads to flood. The Greater Accra Regional Security Council has launched a demolition exercise, targeting unauthorised structures in the Tema Metropolis, Sakumono, Klagon and surrounding areas. The operation began May 27, 2025, it is said to be part of a broader government initiative in order to solve the flooding issues in the capital. Unlike the initial operation, the second phase of the demolish was met with strong disagreement from the property owners who accused authorities of illegally demolishing of buildings, according to them, were not located in waterlogged areas. The Director General of NADMO, Joseph Bikanyi Kuyon, who was part of the task force, stated that despite the opposition from the residents the exercise would continue.

== Transport ==
The town is served by a station of the Ghana Railway Corporation called Asoprochona and a main GPRTU of TUC vehicle station called Estate Junction. Vehicles going to Accra, Circle, Nungua, Tema, Lashibi, Klagon, Ashaiman, Spintex, Airport, East Legon, Madina, Accra Mall (Tetteh Quarshie Roundabout) and Lapaz can all be found at Estate Junction.

== Gallery ==
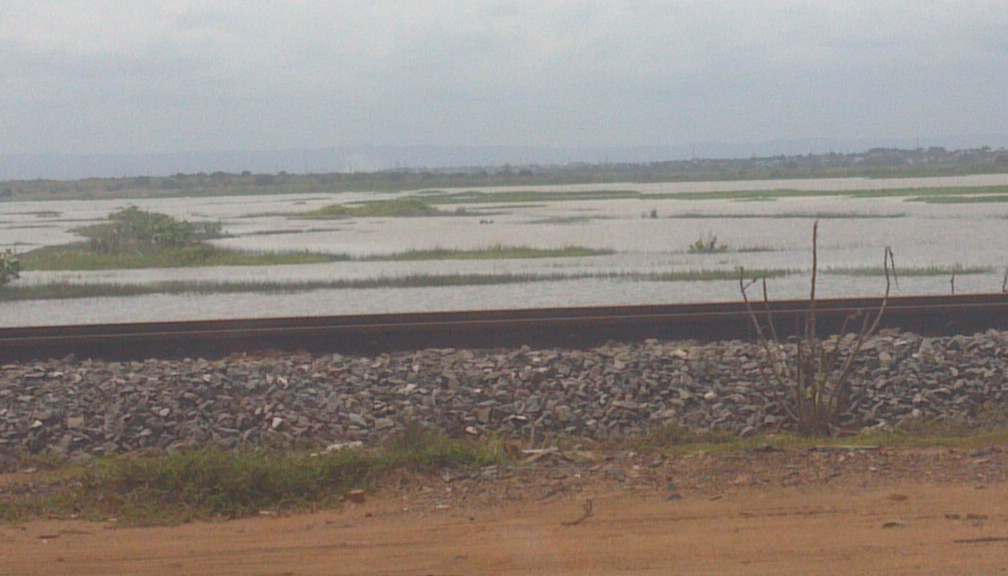

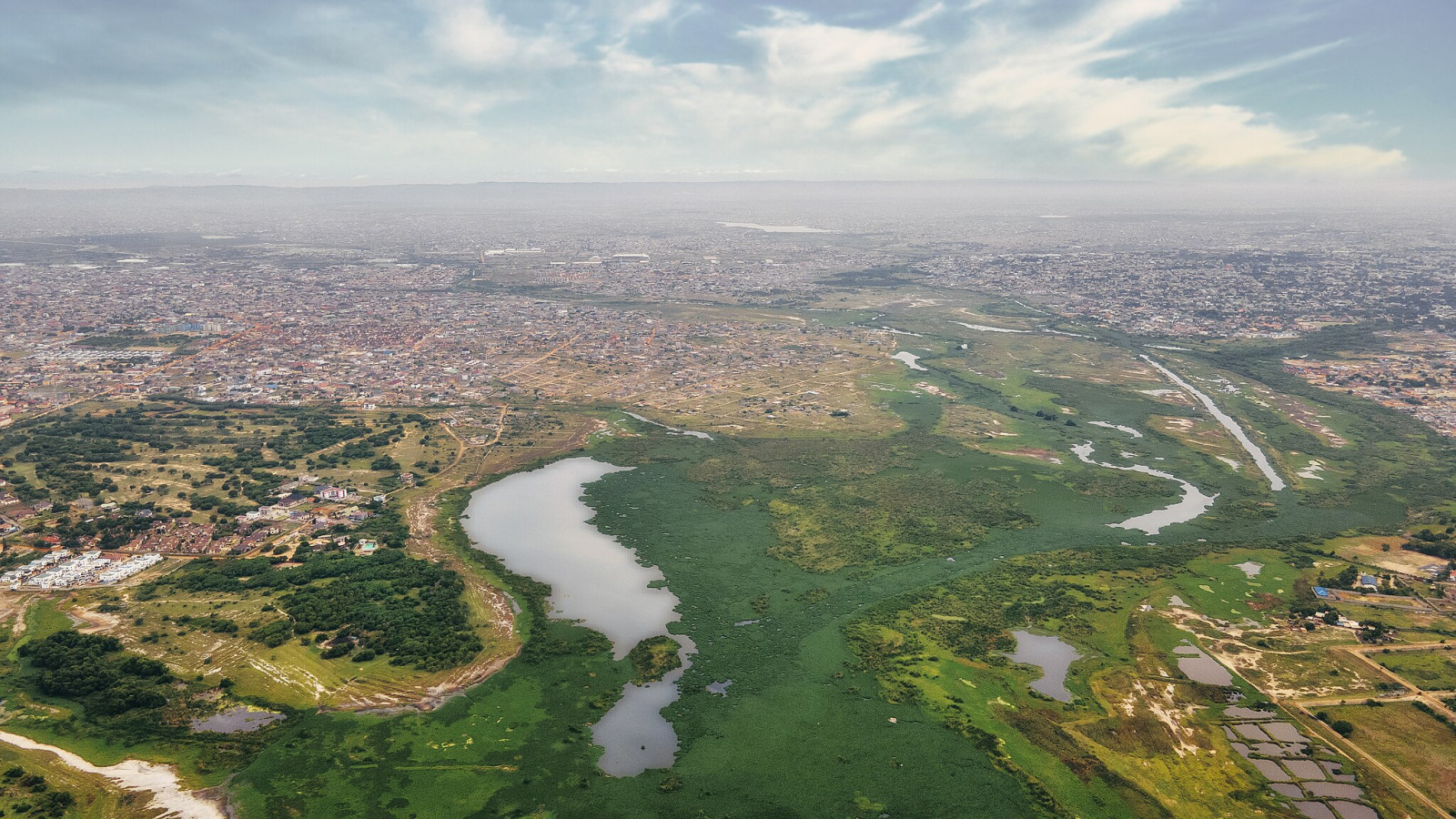
Sakumono Ramsar area

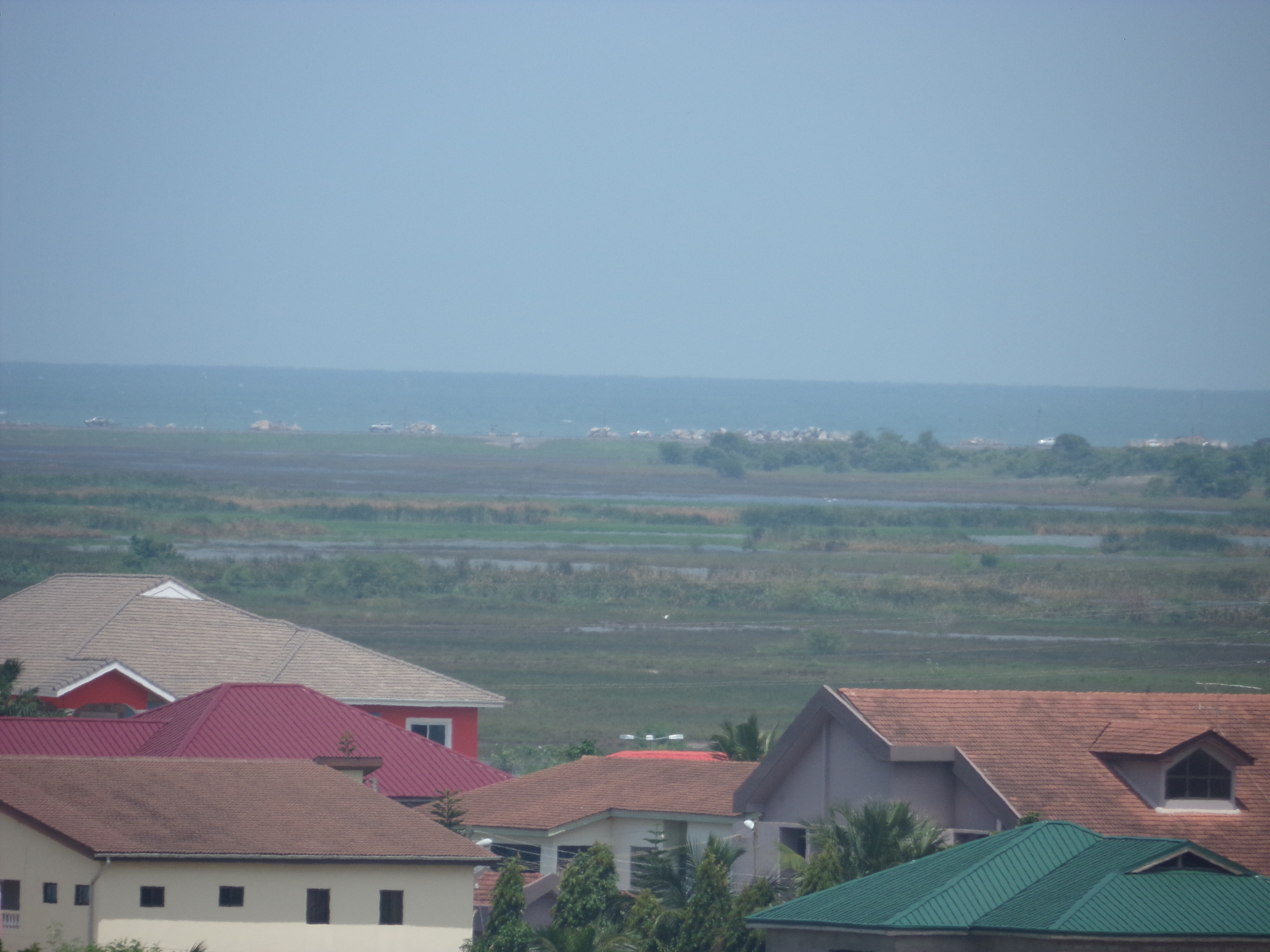
Sakumono Ramsar site

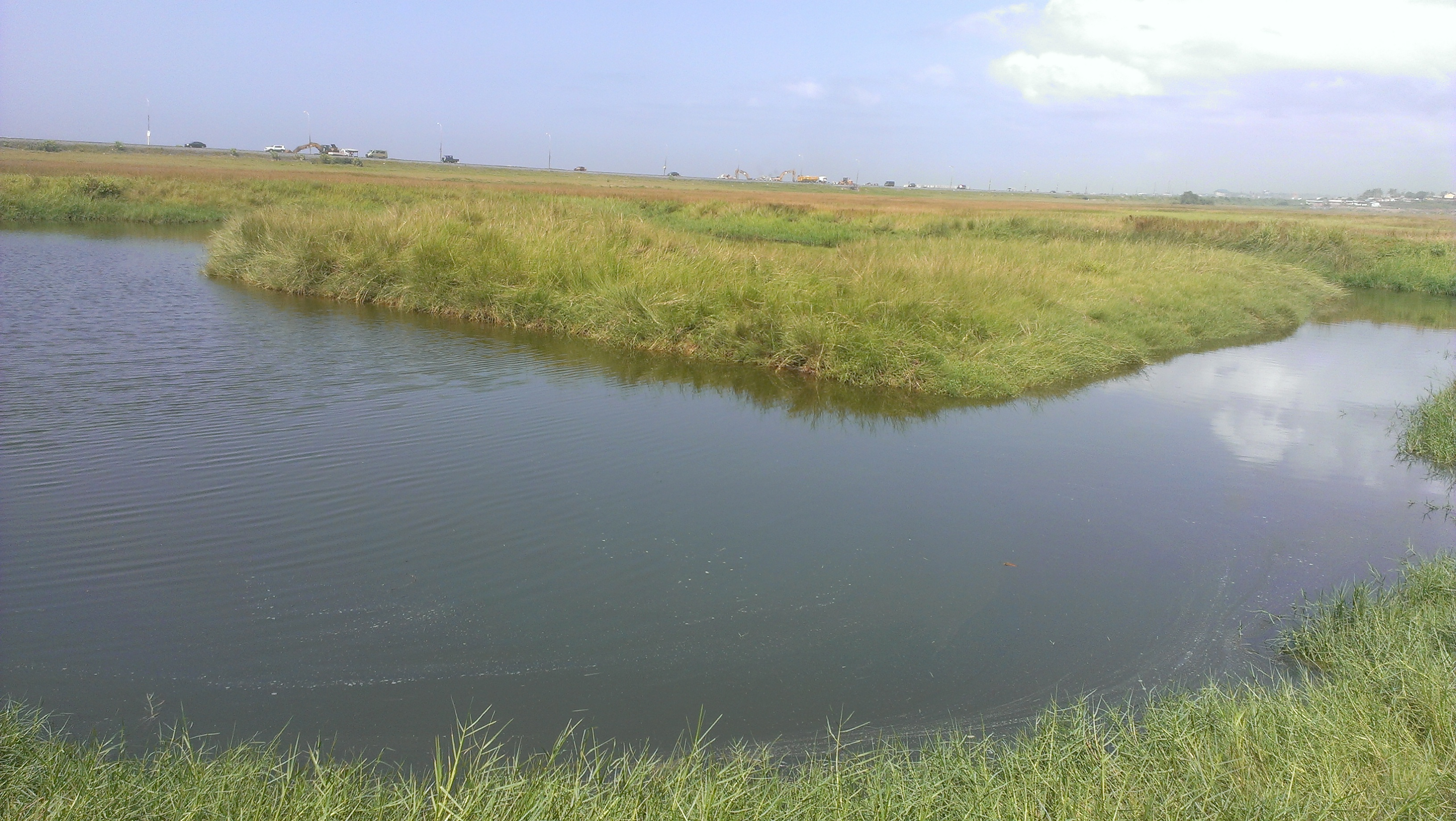

== See also ==
- Railway stations in Ghana
