= Krowor =

Ghana parliament constituency

- constituency for the Parliament of Ghana
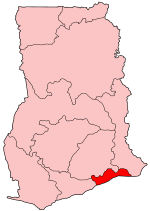
- District: Accra Metropolis District
- Region: Greater Accra Region of Ghana

Current constituency
- Party: National Democratic Congress
- MP: Agnes Naa Momo Lartey

Krowor is one of the constituencies represented in the Parliament of Ghana. It elects one Member of Parliament (MP) by the first past the post system of election. Agnes Naa Momo Lartey is the member of parliament for the constituency. Krowor is located in the Ledzokuku-Krowor Municipal District of the Greater Accra Region of Ghana.

== Boundaries ==
The seat is located entirely within the Ledzokuku-Krowor Municipal District of the Greater Accra Region of Ghana.

== Members of Parliament ==
Election	Member	Party
1992	J.A. Tawiah	National Democratic Congress
1996	Joshua Alabi	National Democratic Congress
2000	Emmanuel Adjei Boye	New Patriotic Party
2004	Abraham Laryea Odai	New Patriotic Party
2008	Nii Oakley Quaye-Kumah	National Democratic Congress
2016	Elizabeth Afoley Quaye	New Patriotic Party

== Elections ==
2008 Ghanaian parliamentary election: Krowor Sources:Ghana Home Page
Party	Candidate	Votes	%	±%
National Democratic Congress	Nii Oakley Quaye	27,339	54.7	+9.8
New Patriotic Party	Joseph Ayikoi Otoo	21,136	42.3	−2.6
Convention People's Party	Emmanuel Attuquaye Botchway	1,530	3.1	−2.1
Majority		6,203	12.4	+10.4
Turnout				—

2004 Ghanaian parliamentary election: Krowor Sources:Electoral Commission of Ghana / Ghana Home Page
Party	Candidate	Votes	%	±%
New Patriotic Party	Abraham Laryea Odai	25,405	46.9	+0.4
National Democratic Congress	Dr Nii Oakley Quaye-Kumah	24,339	44.9	+2.7
Convention People's Party	Theophilus Boye Mensah	2,808	5.2	+2.8
Independent	Emmanuel Borquaye Boyefio	945	1.7	—
Independent	Theophilus Tei Okunnor	658	1.2	—
Majority		1,066	2.0	−2.3
Turnout		54,781	82.2	—

2000 Ghanaian parliamentary election: Krowor Source:Adam Carr's Election Archives
Party	Candidate	Votes	%	±%
New Patriotic Party	Emmanuel Adjei Boye	14,275	46.5	—
National Democratic Congress	Joshua Alabi	12,973	42.2	—
National Reform Party	Seth Nakai-Akee Bortier	2,234	7.3	—
Convention People's Party	Theophilus M. Boye	739	2.4	—
People's National Convention	Joseph Nii-Anum Kpakpo	395	1.3	—
United Ghana Movement	Kudoto Egypt	86	0.3	—
Majority		1,302	4.3	—

1996 Ghanaian parliamentary election: Krowor Source:Google Archives of Ghana Review International
Party	Candidate	Votes	%	±%
National Democratic Congress	Joshua Alabi	—	—	—

1992 Ghanaian parliamentary election: Krowor Source:
Party	Candidate	Votes	%	±%
National Democratic Congress	J.A. Tawiah	—	—	—

== See also ==
- List of Ghana Parliament constituencies
- Parliamentary constituencies in the Greater Accra Region
