= Nana Oye Bampoe Addo =

Ghanaian barrister and gender advocate

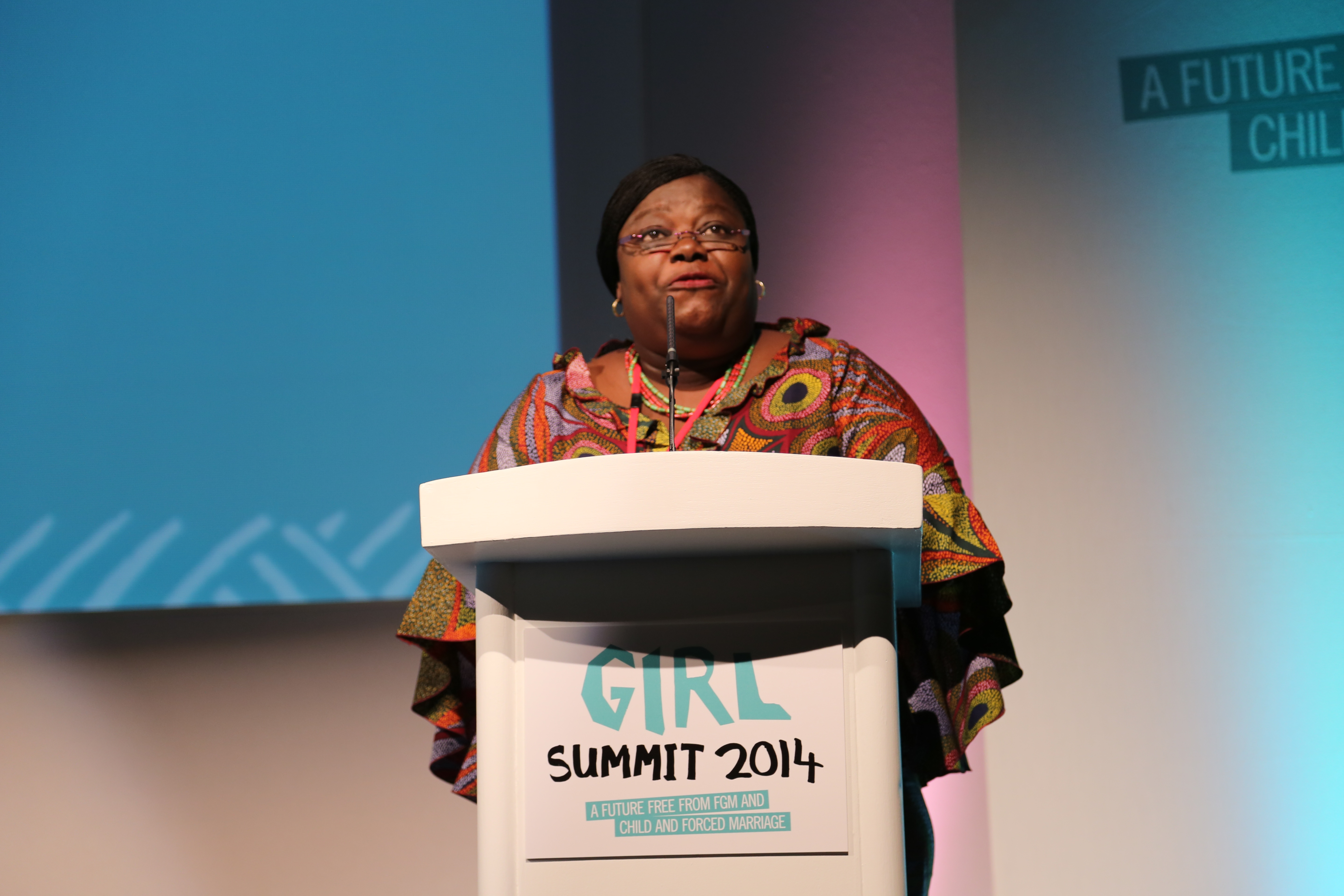
- Nana Oye Bampoe Addo

Minister for Gender, Children and Social Protection
- In office 14 February 2013 – 8 December 2016
- President: John Dramani Mahama
- Preceded by: First
- Succeeded by: Otiko Afisa Djaba

Deputy Chief of staff (Administration)
- Incumbent
- Assumed office 21 January 2025
- President: John Dramani Mahama
- Preceded by: Fawaz Aliu

Personal details
- Party: National Democratic Congress
- Spouse: Tony Lithur [divorced]
- Education: University of Ghana, Wesley Girls' Senior High School
- Occupation: Deputy Chief of Staff (Administration) Office of President Ghana
- Profession: Barrister

Nana Oye Bampoe Addo, formerly known as Nana Oye Lithur, is a Ghanaian barrister and a politician. She is a human rights advocate. She is currently the Deputy Chief of Staff (Administration) at the Office of the President in Ghana.

== Early life and education ==
She was educated at the Ridge Church School and Wesley Girls' Senior High School. She received a Bachelor of Law from the University of Ghana, Legon, and a Masters in Law, Human Rights and Democratization in Africa from the University of Pretoria, South Africa.

== Career ==
She has held the positions of executive director of the Human Rights Advocacy Centre as well as the Regional Coordinator (Africa Office) for the Commonwealth Human Rights Initiative. She has served as a member of the steering committee of the International Consortium on Medical Abortion and an advisory member of the International Consortium on Realising Reproductive Rights.

In 2022, the World Bank appointed her to its Advisory Council for the Partnership for Economic Inclusion, further affirming her global influence. She played a role in advocating for the adoption of the Maputo Protocol and the Declaration of Principles on Freedom of Expression and Access to Information in Africa. As ECOWAS Chair of the Conference of West African Ministers of Gender and Social Development, she facilitated the adoption of gender-related policies.

== Political career ==
She was the Minister for Gender, Children and Social Protection in Ghana from 2013 to 2017, appointed by President John Mahama after the Ghanaian general election. She is a member of the National Democratic Congress. She was appointed as the Secretary to the Manifesto drafting committee of the National Democratic Congress during the 2020 and 2024 elections.

She was also appointed the Board Secretary and CEO of the Atta Mills Memorial Heritage in memory of the Late President John Evans Atta-Mills.

She is currently the Deputy Chief of Staff (Administration) at the Office of the President under John Dramani Mahama.

== Awards and honours ==
- Recipient of the African Servant Leadership Award (2011)
- Champion of Women's Rights Award (2012)
- West African Women in Leadership Award for Distinguished Impact

== Personal life ==
Nana Oye is divorced and she has 4 children.

== See also ==
- List of Mahama government ministers
- National Democratic Congress

Political offices
New title	Minister for Gender, Children and Social Protection; 2013 – 2016	Incumbent
