= Ministry of Women and Children's Affairs =

Government ministry of Ghana

- Ministry of Gender, Children and Social Protection

Agency overview
- Formed: 2001
- Jurisdiction: Republic of Ghana
- Headquarters: Accra, Ghana
- Minister responsible: Agnes Naa Momo Lartey, Minister

The Ministry of Women and Children's Affairs (MWCA) or Ministry of Gender, Children and Social Protection (MGCSP) of Ghana is the government ministry responsible for the formulation of policies that promote the institutionalization and development of women and children issues.

== History ==
The ministry was created in 2001 by the John Kufuor administration to address women and children issues.

== Minister of the MWCA and MGCSP ==
The head of the ministry is the Minister of Women and Children's Affairs and Minister for Gender, Children and Social Protection. The first head of the ministry when it was created in 2001 was Gladys Asmah and first head of the ministry when it was renamed MGCSP in February 2013 is Nana Oye Lithur.

Year	Minister
2001–2005	Gladys Asmah
2005–2009	Alima Mahama
2009–2010	Akua Sena Dansua (MP)
2010–2012	Juliana Azumah-Mensah (MP)
2013–2017	Nana Oye Lithur
2017 -2018	Otiko Afisa Djaba
2018–2020	Cynthia Morrison (MP)
2021 - 2022	Sarah Adwoa Safo
2022 - 2024	Lariba Abudu
2025 -	Agnes Naa Momo Lartey

== Advocacy ==
The ministry's role makes it advocate for better treatment for women and children. Issues of concern that come to the fore are handled by the ministry. One of such issues was the 2011 when the ministry announced it would in collaboration with the Ghana Department of Social Welfare undertake a re-registration of orphanages in the country. This was due to media publications of poor management of certain Orphanages in the country. The publications reported that the orphanages were being used as transit points for child trafficking and had become places of abuse for inmates.

== Awards ==
The ministry in 2011 celebrated International Women's Day in Accra. During the celebration, the maiden Ghana Women of Excellence Awards was held at the Accra International Conference Centre. The awards day was themed ‘Empowering the Ghanaian Woman for National Development’. 34 Ghanaian women were honoured at the ceremony for their contribution to national development.
