= Gladys Nortey Ashitey =

Ghanaian politician

MP for Ledzokuku
- In office 7 January 2005 – 6 January 2009
- President: John Agyekum Kufour

Personal details
- Born: 21 November 1955 (age 70) Ledzokuku, Greater Accra Region Gold Coast (now Ghana)
- Party: New Patriotic Party
- Education: University of Ghana, Accra
- Occupation: Politician
- Profession: Physician

Gladys Nortey Ashitey (born 21 November 1955) is a Ghanaian Politician and a member of the Fourth Parliament of the Fourth Republic representing the Ledzokuku Constituency in the Greater Accra Region of Ghana.

== Early life and education ==
Ashitey was born on 21 November 1955 in Ledzokuku in the Greater Accra Region of Ghana on 21 November 1955. She attended the America University of the Caribbean and obtained a Degree in Doctor of Medicine after studying Medicine as a Programme. She also attended the University of Ghana and obtained her Bachelor of Science (Medicine).

== Politics ==
Ashitey was first elected into Parliament on the Ticket of the New Patriotic Party during the December 2004 Ghanaian General elections as a member of Parliament for the Ledzokuku Constituency in the Greater Accra Region of Ghana. She polled 33,039 votes out of the 76,674 valid votes cast representing 43.10%. She was defeated in 2008 by a National Democratic Congress Candidate Nii Nortey Dua. She served only one term as parliamentarian.

== Career ==
Ashitey is a physician and a former Member of Parliament for the Lezdokuku Constituency in the Greater Accra Region of Ghana.

== Personal life ==
Ashitey is a Christian.
