= Agnes Naa Momo Lartey =

Ghanaian politician

The Honourable Agnes Naa Momo Lartey
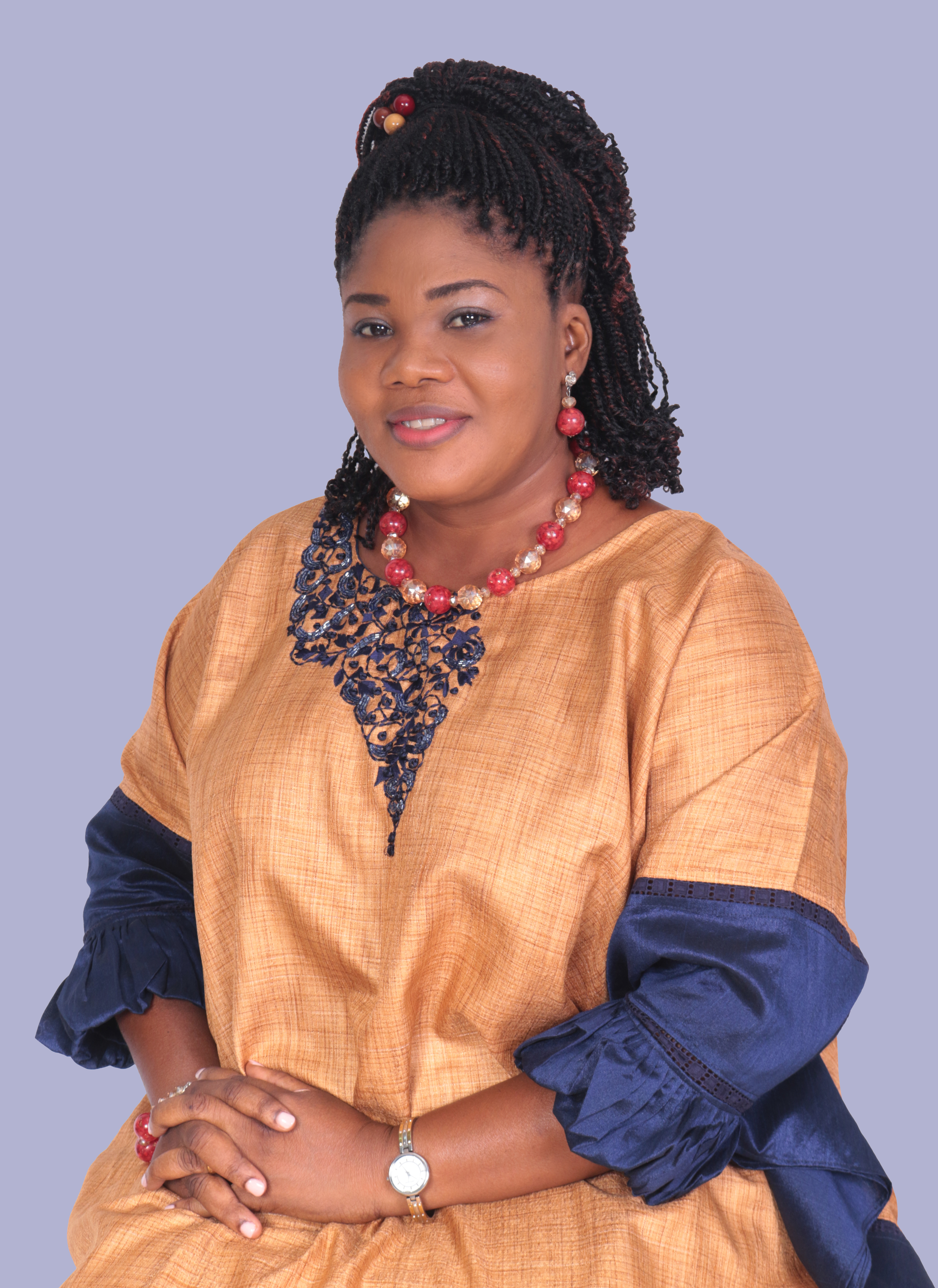

Minister for Ministry of Women and Children's Affairs
- Incumbent
- Assumed office February 2025
- Preceded by: Lariba Abudu

Member of Parliament for Krowor Constituency
- Incumbent
- Assumed office 7 January 2025
- President: John Dramani Mahama

Member of Parliament for Krowor Constituency
- In office 7 January 2021 – 6 January 2025
- President: Nana Akufo-Addo
- Preceded by: Elizabeth Afoley Quaye

Personal details
- Born: April 16, 1976 (age 50) Krowor
- Party: National Democratic Congress
- Website: naamomolartey.org

Agnes Naa Momo Lartey is a Ghanaian politician. She contested in the 2020 Ghanaian General Election and won the parliamentary seat for the Krowor Constituency. She retained the seat during the 2024 Ghanaian general election for the National Democratic Congress (Ghana). She is also the Minister in charge of the Ministry of Women and Children's Affairs.

== Early life and education ==
She was born on 16 April 1976. Her home town is Krowor. She is a Christian. She holds qualifications from the University of Professional Studies, Accra, the University of Cape Coast, and Central University College, among other institutions.

== Politics ==
Naa Momo began her political career in 2000. Since then, she has served as an assembly woman and a presiding member of the Krowor Municipal Assembly.

In December 2016, she contested in the 2016 Ghanaian General Election under the ticket of the National Democratic Congress and lost to Elizabeth Afoley Quaye of the New Patriotic Party. She contested again in the 2020 Ghanaian General Election under the ticket of the National Democratic Congress and won. She polled 41,850 votes which represents 55.80% of the total votes cast. She was elected over incumbent Elizabeth Afoley Quaye of the New Patriotic Party and Hannah Bortey of the Ghana Union Movement. These two parties obtained 32,604 and 545 votes respectively out of the total valid votes cast. Representing 43.47% and 0.73% respectively of total valid votes cast.

In 2024, she again contested on the ticket of the National Democratic Congress and won with 39,198 votes while her opponent from the New Patriotic Party, Emmanuel Laryea Odai polled 23,116 votes.

She was appointed Gender, Children and Social Protection minister designate by president in January 2024 but her swearing in was delayed even after parliamentary approval due to her being late.
