= Ledzokuku =

Parliamentary constituency in Ghana

- constituency for the Parliament of Ghana
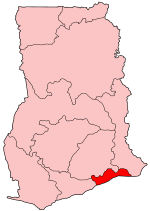
- District: Accra Metropolis District
- Region: Greater Accra Region of Ghana

Current constituency
- Party: National Democratic Congress
- MP: Benjamin Narteh Ayiku

Ledzokuku is one of the constituencies represented in the Parliament of Ghana. It elects one Member of Parliament (MP) by the first past the post system of election. Benjamin Narteh Ayiku is the member of parliament for the constituency. Ledzokuku is located in the Dangme East District of the Greater Accra Region of Ghana.

The municipality is bounded to the south by the Gulf of Guinea (from the Kpeshie Lagoon to the Sakumono Junction). It continues along the railway line through Sakumono to the ‘on the run’ traffic light. It is bounded to the East by the Spintex Road towards the Coca-Cola Roundabout. This turns to the left and right by Johnson Wax. To the north of the boundary is the Motorway through to the Tetteh Quarshie Interchange and moves south along the boundaries of the Ashitey Akomfra Electoral area and towards the estuary of the Kpeshie lagoon. The constituency is home to one of the main major hospitals in Accra, the Lekma hospital.

== Members of Parliament ==
Election	Member	Party
1992	Nii Adjei-Boye Sekan	National Democratic Congress
1996	Nii Adjei-Boye Sekan	National Democratic Congress
2000	Eddie Akita	New Patriotic Party
2004	Gladys Nortey Ashitey	New Patriotic Party
2008	Nii Nortey Duah	National Democratic Congress
2012	Benita Sena Okity-Duah	National Democratic Congress
2016	Bernard Okoe-Boye	New Patriotic Party
2020	Benjamin Narteh Ayiku	National Democratic Congress
2024	Benjamin Narteh Ayiku	National Democratic congress

== Elections ==
MPs elected in the Ghanaian parliamentary election, 2008:Ledzokuku Source: Ghana Home Page
Party	Candidate	Votes	%	±%
National Democratic Congress	Nii Nortey Dua	42,087	56.6	—
New Patriotic Party	Gladys Norley Ashitey	30,622	41.2	—
Convention People's Party	Griffiths Agoe Sowah	832	1.1	—
Independent (politics)	Olan Adjetey	612	0.8	—
Democratic Freedom Party	Nathaniel Nii Okai Aryittey	110	0.1	—
New Vision Party	Angela Adams	86	0.1	—
Majority				—
Turnout		—	—	—

MPs elected in the Ghanaian parliamentary election, 2016:Ledzokuku Source: [ https://ghanaelections.peacefmonline.com/pages/2016/greateraccra/ledzokuku/
Party	Candidate	Votes	%	±%
New Patriotic Party	BENARD OKOE BOYE	45,259	50.75%	—
National Democratic Congress	BENITA SENA OKITY-DUAH	43,092	48.32%	—
Convention People's Party	EMMANUEL NII ASHIA ANYANKOR	433	0.49%	—
Independent (politics)	STEPHEN STANLEY QUAYE	310	0.35%	—
People's National Convention	YAKUBU FAHARUDEEN	95	0.11%	—
Majority				—
Turnout		—	—	—

== See also ==
- List of Ghana Parliament constituencies
