= Abraham Laryea Odai =

Ghanaian politician

Hon. Abraham Laryea Odai

Member of Parliament for Krowor Constituency
- In office 7 January 2005 – 6 January 2009
- President: John Kufuor

Personal details
- Party: New Patriotic Party

Abraham Laryea Odai is a Ghanaian politician who served as a member of parliament for the Krowor Constituency.

== Political career ==
Odai is a member of the 4th parliament of the 4th republic. He became a member of parliament after winning the 2004 Ghanaian general election for the New Patriotic Party. He escaped an assassination attempt in 2007.

== Elections ==
Odai was elected as the member of parliament for the Krowor constituency of the Greater Accra Region of Ghana in the 2004 Ghanaian general elections. He won on the ticket of the New Patriotic Party. His constituency was a part of the 16 parliamentary seats out of 27 seats won by the New Patriotic Party in that election for the Greater Accra Region. The New Patriotic Party won a majority total of 128 parliamentary seats out of 230 seats. He was elected with 25,405 votes out of 54,155 total valid votes cast. This was equivalent to 46.9% of total valid votes cast. He was elected over Dr. Nii Oakley Quaye-Kumah of the National Democratic Congress, Theophilus Boye Mensah of the Convention People's Party, Theophilus Tei Okunor and Emmanuel Borquaye Boyefio both independent candidates. These obtained 24,339, 2,808, 658 and 945 votes respectively of total valid votes cast. These were equivalent to 44.9%, 5.2%, 1.2% and 1.7% respectively of total valid votes cast.

== Personal life ==
He is a Christian.
