= Fawaz Aliu =

Ghanaian diplomat (born 1982)

Deputy Chief of Staff
- In office 7 January 2021 – 6 January 2025
- President: Nana Akufo-Addo
- Preceded by: Francis Asenso-Boakye
- Succeeded by: Nana Oye Bampoe Addo

Personal details
- Born: Fawaz Aliu; 23 March 1982 (age 44)
- Party: New Patriotic Party
- Education: Tamale Secondary School, University of Cape Coast, University of Ghana, Diplomatic Academy of Vienna
- Profession: Politician, Ghanaian Diplomat, Administrator

Fawaz Aliu (born 23 March 1982) is a Ghanaian diplomat, administrator, politician and member of the New Patriotic Party. He was a deputy chief of staff at the office of Ghana's presidency. Before joining the presidency, Fawaz worked with Ghana's permanent Mission to the United Nations, serving as a delegate on social, cultural and humanitarian issues.

== Early life and education ==
Born in Tamale, Ghana in 1982, Fawaz had his basic education in the Northern Regional Capital. Between 1997 and 1999, Fawaz studied science at the Tamale Secondary School (TAMASCO) for his SSSCE honours. He entered the University of Cape Coast in 2002 and graduated in 2006 with a bachelor's degree in biological science. He earned a master of arts degree in international affairs from the University of Ghana in 2010. He also earned executive qualifications from the Diplomatic Academy of Vienna, Austria. Fawaz is a fellow of the Center for Strategic and International Studies of the Abshire-Inamori Academy in Washington, D.C.

== Career ==
Fawaz worked as the officer in-charge of biometric passport application at the Northern Region Passport Office. He was given additional responsibilities of overseeing applications from the Upper East and Upper West Regions. He also previously worked as front desk officer at the Ministry of Foreign Affairs and Regional Integration. Fawaz also served at Ghana's Permanent Mission to the United Nations as delegate on Social, Culture and Humanitarian issues.

In 2021, Fawaz was appointed to serve in Nana Akufo-Addo's second term as deputy chief of staff. Fawaz responsibility is liaising with the foreign ministry, diplomatic missions and international organisations to facilitate the president's foreign agenda and programs. In August 2024, Fawaz was sworn in by Nana AKufo-Addo as ambassador Extraordinary and Plenipotentiary At-large.

== Politics ==
Fawaz Aliu is the New Patriotic Party's parliamentary candidate for election 2024 in the Zabzugu Constituency in the Northern Region. He contested the party's parliamentary primaries in January 2024 and obtained 263 votes to beat incumbent John Jabaah Bennam who got 175 votes.
