= Lekma Hospital =

LEKMA Hospital
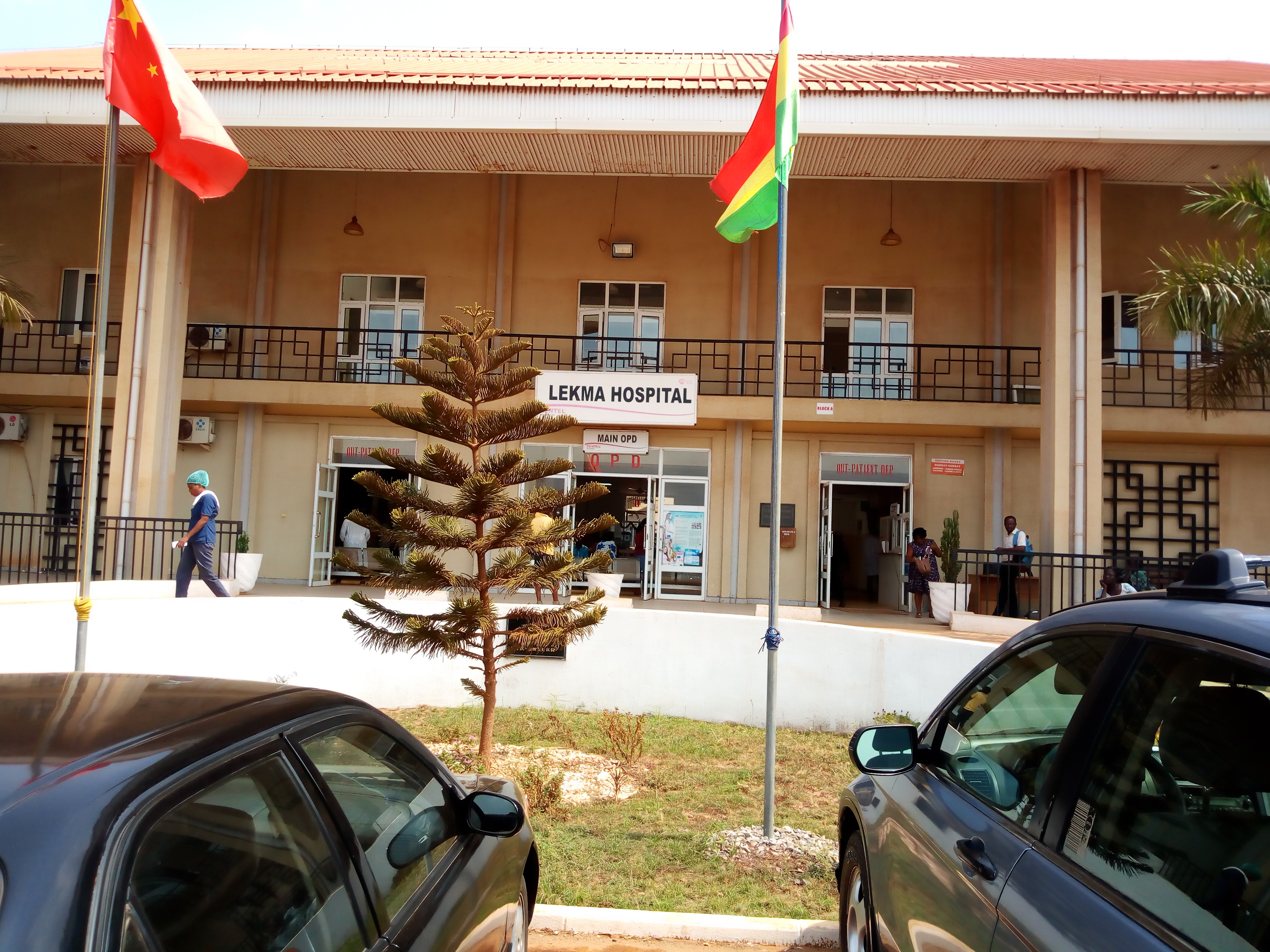
- Health service provider

Geography
- Location: Teshie, Greater Accra, Ghana

Links
- Website: www.lekmahospital.org
- Lists: Hospitals in Ghana

The Ledzokuku-Krowor Municipal Assembly (LEKMA) Hospital is a hospital located at Teshie in Accra. It is a government hospital.

== Donation ==
Consolidated Bank donated medical beds to LEKMA Hospital in Accra as part of its regional CSR activities.

LEKMA received a consignment of PPEs from Standard Chartered Bank
