= Sakumono Lagoon =

Lagoon in the Greater Accra Region, Ghana

Coordinates: 5°38′30″N 0°02′00″W

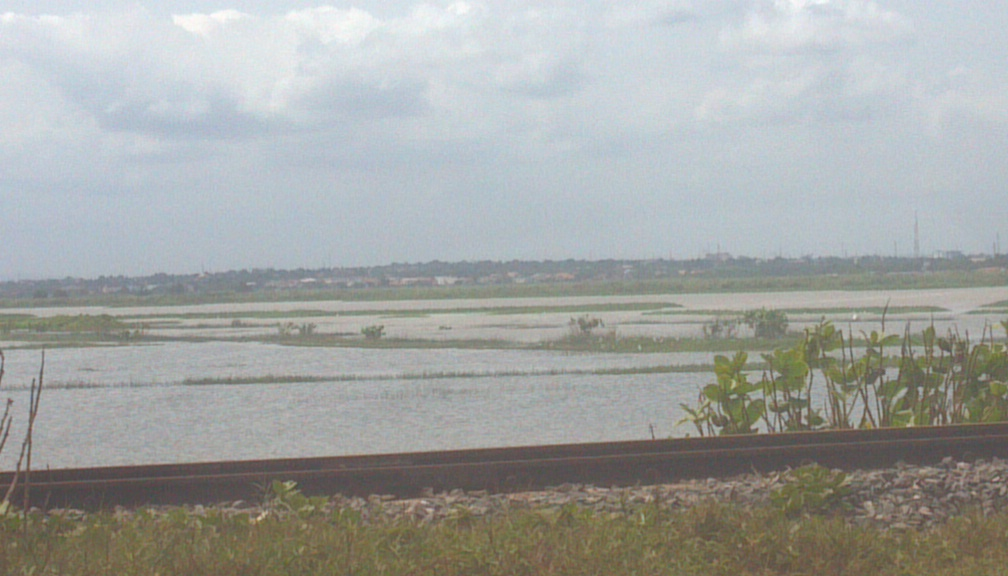

Sakumono Lagoon is a coastal lagoon in Sakumono near Tema in the Greater Accra Region of Ghana, West Africa. The site covers 1,340 hectares. It was designated to form the bulk of the Sakumo Ramsar Site, a Ramsar wetland site of international importance, on 14 August 1992.

== Physical features ==
The site consists of a broad coastal brackish lagoon with a narrow connection to the sea, the main habitats being open lagoon, surrounding floodplains, freshwater marsh and coastal savanna grassland.

== Fauna ==
The site of the lagoon receives rare and endangered migratory bird species, and several fish species.
