= Krowor Municipal Assembly =

- Municipal Assembly
- Assemblies of Greater Accra Region

- Location of Krowor Municipal Assembly within Greater Accra
- Coordinates: 5°36′N 0°4′W
- Country: Ghana
- Region: Greater Accra
- Capital: Nungua

Population (2021)
  - Total: 143,012
- Time zone: UTC+0 (GMT)
- ISO 3166 code: GH-EP-__

Krowor Municipal Assembly is one of the twenty-nine Assemblies in Greater Accra Region, Ghana. Originally it was formerly part of the defunct Ledzokuku-Krowor Municipal District on 29 February 2008 (which was created from Accra Metropolitan Assembly on 1988), until part of the district was split off to create Krowor Municipal Assembly on 15 March 2018; thus the remaining original part has been renamed as Ledzokuku Municipal Assembly. The municipality is located in the central part of Greater Accra Region and has Nungua as its capital town.
