= Ledzokuku-Krowor Municipal Assembly =

- Former Municipal Assembly
- Seal

- Districts of Greater Accra Region

- Location of Ledzokuku-Krowor Assembly within Greater Accra
- Coordinates: 5°36′N 0°4′W
- Country: Ghana
- Region: Greater Accra
- Capital: Teshie-Nungua

Government
  - Municipal Chief Executive: Evelyn Naa Adjeley Twum-Gyamrah

Area
  - Total: 47.58 km^{2} (18.37 sq mi)

Population (2019)
  - Total: 280,924
- Time zone: UTC+0 (GMT)
- ISO 3166 code: GH-EP-LK
- Website: Official Website

Ledzokuku-Krowor Municipal Assembly is a former district that was located in Greater Accra Region, Ghana. Originally it was formerly part of Accra Metropolitan Assembly in 1988 (later as a sub-metropolitan district council on 2003), until the far eastern portion of the district was split off to create Ledzokuku-Krowor Municipal Assembly on 1 November 2007 (effectively 29 February 2008); thus the remaining part has been retained as Accra Metropolitan District. However on 15 March 2018, it was split off into two new municipal districts: Ledzokuku Municipal District (capital: Teshie-Nungua) and Krowor Municipal District (capital: Nungua). The municipality was located in the central part of Greater Accra Region and had Teshie-Nungua as its capital town.

== Population ==
As of 2010, it had a census population of 227,932. It spans an area of 47.58 km^{2} (18.37 mi^{2}).

== Administration ==
The local authority of the district, the Ledzokuku-Krowor Municipal Assembly, is currently headed by Evelyn Naa Adjeley Twum-Gyamrah, who was appointed by the President of the Republic of Ghana in 2017 as the Municipal Chief Executive and serves as the political head of the district.

Administratively, the district is one of the 12 local authority districts of the Greater Accra Metropolitan Area, which include Accra Metropolitan Assembly, Tema Metropolitan Assembly, Ga South Municipal Assembly, Ga Central Municipal Assembly, Ga West Municipal Assembly, Ga East Municipal Assembly, Adentan Municipal District, Ashaiman Municipal District, La Nkwantanang Madina Municipal District, La Dade Kotopon Municipal Assembly, and Kpone Katamanso Municipal District.

== History ==
Under the local government arrangements when the Accra City Council was created in 1953, six area councils were established namely Ablekuma, Ashiedu Keteke, Ayawaso, Okaikoi, Osu Klotey and Kpeshie (which comprised Teshie, Nungua and La). This system operated until 18 March 1989 when Accra was elevated to metropolitan district status and the area councils became sub-metropolitan district councils under Legislative Instrument 1500 of the new Local Government System (PNDCL 207) Act 462.

In 2003, part of the first schedule of the Accra Metropolitan Legislative Instrument of 1995 (LI 161) was amended and replaced with Legislative Instrument 1722 of 2003 which led to the creation of 7 more sub-metropolitan district councils out of the existing 6. The Kpeshie sub-metropolitan district council was split into the Nungua, Teshie and La sub-metropolitan districts; the Ablekuma sub-metropolitan district council was split into the Ablekuma North, Ablekuma Central, and Ablekuma South sub-metropolitan districts; the Ayawaso sub-metropolitan district council was split into the Ayawaso Central, Ayawaso East, and Ayawaso West sub-metropolitan district council; and the Okaikoi sub-metropolitan district council was split into the Okaikoi North and Okaikoi South sub-metropolitan district council. This intervention was informed by the need to break up the district into smaller sectors to facilitate good governance.

In 2007, to promote efficiency in the administrative machinery and also meet the ever pressing demands for amenities and essential services, the Teshie and Nungua sub-metropolitan district councils were merged and upgraded to a Municipal Status in 2007 as the Ledzokuku-Krowor Municipal District under Legislative Instrument 1865.

In 2017, the government laid before Parliament Legislative Instruments (LI) for the creation new districts. In the LI, the Ledzokuku-Krowor Municipal Assembly is to be split into the Ledzokuku Municipal Assembly and the Krowor Municipal Assembly.

== Administrative area ==
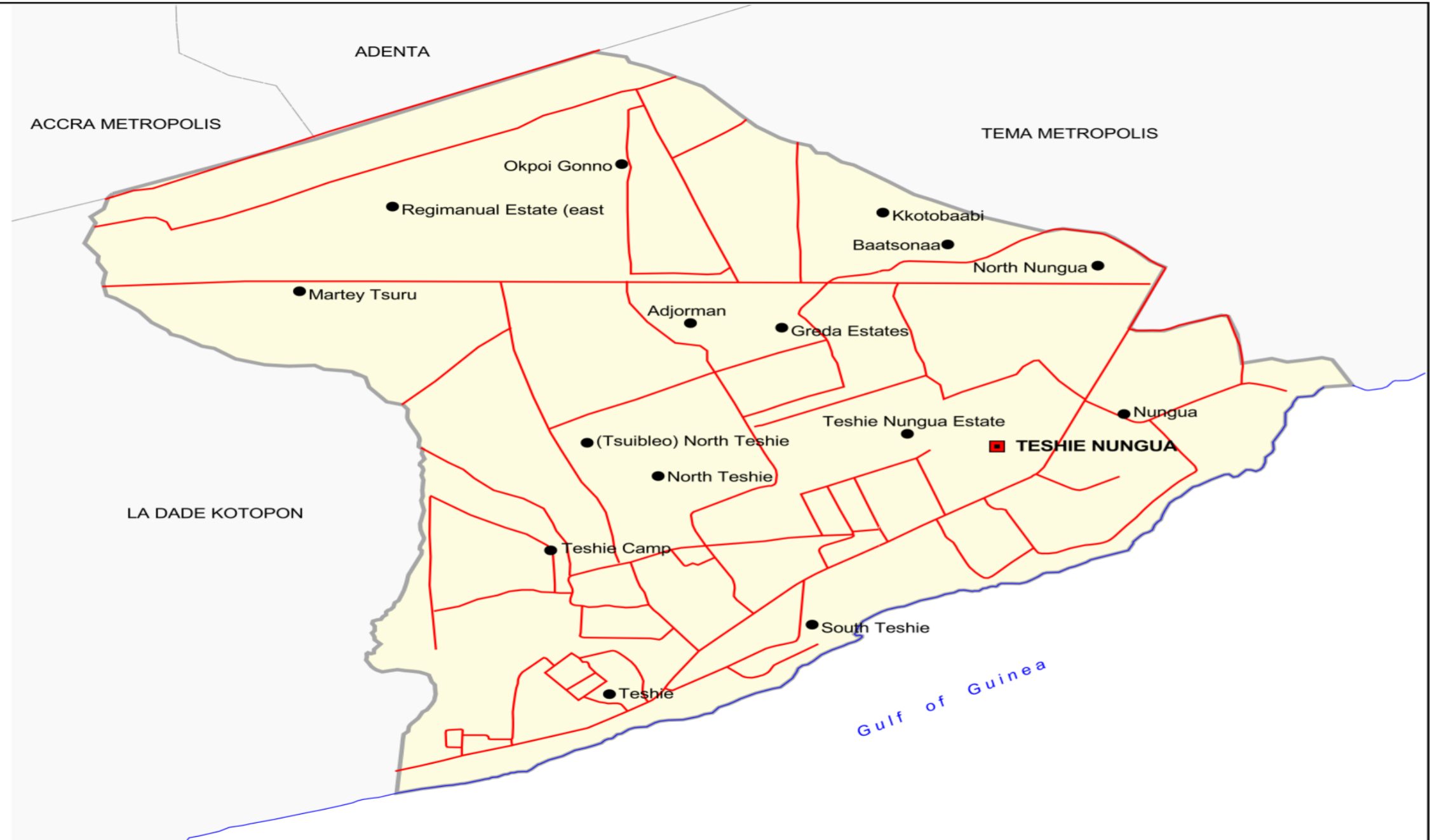
Communities within the Ledzokuku-Krowor Municipal Assembly

The district covers an area of 47.58 km^{2} (18.37 mi^{2}) and is bounded to the west by the La Dade Kotopon Municipal Assembly, to the east by the Tema Metropolitan Assembly, to the north by the Accra Metropolitan Assembly and Ashaiman Municipal district, and to the south by the Gulf of Guinea.

=== Communities ===
The largest 20 communities in the district by population are:

- Nungua
- North Teshie
- South Teshie
- Teshie Nungua Estate
- Teshie Camp
- Teshie
- Baatsonaa
- North Nungua
- Martey Tsuru
- Adjorman
- Greda Estates
- Regimanuel Estate (East Airport)
- Tsuibleo (North Teshie)
- Okpoi Gonno
- Kotobaabi

=== Electoral areas ===
The Ledzokuku Krowor Municipal District is made up of 24 electoral areas.

Constituency	Electoral area
Ledzokuku	West Akromadeokpo
Ledzokuku	East Akromadeokpo
Ledzokuku	Nii Ashitey Akomfra
Ledzokuku	Okesekor
Ledzokuku	Aborle-Bu
Ledzokuku	Sutsurunor
Ledzokuku	Agblesan
Ledzokuku	Tsuibleoo South
Ledzokuku	Tsuibleoo Central
Ledzokuku	Tsuibleoo North
Ledzokuku	South Teshie Nungua Estate
Ledzokuku	North Teshie Nungua Estate
Krowor	Kloowe Koo Naa
Krowor	Nkpor
Krowor	Adogon
Krowor	Nii Lawer
Krowor	Sookpoti
Krowor	Nii Odai Ablade
Krowor	Antwere Gonno
Krowor	Blekese East
Krowor	Blekese West
Krowor	Mukwedjor
Krowor	Baatsonaa
Krowor	Okpoi Gonno

== Demographics ==
At the 2010 census, there were 227,932 people residing in the district, out of which 26,621 were born elsewhere in the region, while 56,388 were born in other regions. The current population based Ghana Statistical Service record is 280,924. Migrants born in the Volta region have the largest proportion (34%) followed by those born in the Eastern region (23.6%).

The total household population in the district is 221,757, which comprises 60,859 households who live in the 21,366 houses within the district. The average household size in the district is 2.8 persons per household and the population per house is estimated at 10.4, indicating that compound houses are the most common type of dwelling (68.5%) within the district.

40.9% of the population were under the age of 19, 10.5% between 20 and 24, 10.7% between 25 and 29, 44.8% between 30 and 44, 12.1% between 45 and 64, and 3.3% age 65 and over. For every 100 females, there were about 91.9 males.

== Governance ==
The Ledzokuku Krowor Municipal Assembly is administered by the Ledzokuku Krowor Municipal Assembly.

The Assembly through the Local Government Act 1993 462 (section 10 sub sections 1,2,3,4 and 5), carries out the legislative, deliberative and executive functions of Government. These functions are summarized as follows:

- Provision of a sound sanitary and healthy environment
- Provision of educational infrastructure for first and second cycle schools
- Provision of markets and lorry parks within the Metropolis
- The planning and development control of all infrastructure within Accra
- Activities bordering on the maintenance of peace and security within the Metropolis
- Provision of public safety and comfort

These general functions are also reflected in the detailed 86 functions outlined in the second schedule of L.I. 1865, 2007 which established the Ledzokuku-Krowor Municipal Assembly. There are currently 38 Assembly members including the Municipal Chief Executive and two members of parliament for Ledzokuku and Krowor constituencies. The other 35 Assembly members are made up of 11 appointed and 24 elected members. Out of the 11 appointed members, the presiding member and 6 others are women while only two out of the elected 24 members are women. In all 7 out of the 38 Assembly members are women indicating only 18 percent participation level of women in Local governance at the Assembly level. This low level of women participation in governance indicates that more programmes needs to be put in place to encourage more women to participate in local level election. The elected Assembly members are from 24 electoral areas namely Tsuibleoo central, Tsui bleoo North, Teshie-Nungua North, Sutsuruno, Teshie-Nungua Estates South, Nii Laweh Blekese East, AddoGonno, Baatsonaa, Mukwedjor, Blekese West, Nii Odai Ablade, Nkpor, Kliowe Koo Naa, Sookpoti, OkpoiGonno, Aborlebu, Akror West, Okesekor, Tsuibleoo South, Antsewere Gonno, Akro East, Agblezaa and Nii Ashitey Akomfra.

== Climate ==
Climate chart (precipitation, max. and min. temperature)
J	F	M	A	M	J	J	A	S	O	N	D
15 31 23	33 31 24	56 31 24	81 31 24	142 31 24	178 29 23	46 27 23	15 27 22	36 27 23	64 29 23	36 31 24	23 31 24
- █ Average max. and min. temperatures in °C
- █ Precipitation totals in mm
- Source: BBC Weather
Imperial conversion
J	F	M	A	M	J	J	A	S	O	N	D
0.6 87 73	1.3 88 75	2.2 88 76	3.2 88 76	5.6 87 75	7 84 74	1.8 81 74	0.6 80 71	1.4 81 73	2.5 85 74	1.4 87 75	0.9 88 75
- █ Average max. and min. temperatures in °F
- █ Precipitation totals in inches

LEKMA lies in the Coastal Grassland zone which experiences a double maxima rainy season pattern. The Ledzokuku Krowor Municipal District features a tropical savanna climate (Köppen climate classification Aw) that borders on a hot semi-arid climate (BSh). The average annual rainfall is about 730 mm, which falls primarily during Ghana's two rainy seasons. The chief rainy season begins in April and ends in mid-July, whilst a weaker second rainy season occurs in October. Rain usually falls in short intensive storms and causes local flooding in which drainage channels are obstructed.

Very little variation in temperature occurs throughout the year. The mean monthly temperature ranges from 25.9 °C (78.6 °F) in August (the coolest) to 29.6 °C (85.3 °F) in March (the hottest), with an annual average of 27.6 °C (81.7 °F). The "cooler" months tend to be more humid than the warmer months. As a result, during the warmer months and particularly during the windy harmattan season, the district experiences a breezy "dry heat" that feels less warm than the "cooler" but more humid rainy season.

As a coastal district, Ledzokuku Krowor is vulnerable to the impacts of climate change and sea level rise. Drainage infrastructure is particularly at risk, which has profound implications for people's livelihoods, especially in informal settlements. Inadequate planning regulation and law enforcement, as well as perceived corruption in government processes, lack of communication across government departments and lack of concern or government co-ordination with respect to building codes are major impediments to progressing the development of the district's drainage infrastructure, according to the Climate & Development Knowledge Network.

As Ledzokuku Krowor is close to the equator, the daylight hours are practically uniform during the year. Relative humidity is generally high, varying from 65% in the midafternoon to 95% at night. The predominant wind direction in the district is from the WSW to NNE sectors. Wind speeds normally range between 8 and 16 km/h. High wind gusts occur with thunderstorms, which generally pass in squalls along the coast.
