= Nungua =

Town in Greater Accra Region, Ghana

- Town
- Location in Ghana
- Coordinates: 5°36′0″N 0°4′0″W
- Country: Ghana
- Region: Greater Accra Region
- District: Krowor Municipal District

Population (2012)
  - Total: 84,119
- Ranked 18th in Ghana
- Time zone: GMT
  - Summer (DST): GMT

Nungua is a town in Krowor Municipal District in the Greater Accra Region of southeastern Ghana near the coast. Nungua is the eighteenth most populous settlement in Ghana, in terms of population, with a population of 84,119 people.

== Politics ==
Nungua is located within Krowor Constituency led by Agnes Naa Momo Lartey, a member of the National Democratic Congress, who succeeded Elizabeth Afoley Quaye of the New Patriotic Party.

== Traditions ==
The people of Nungua are Ga Adangbes. They celebrate the Kpledzoo festival. They are in eight clans, namely: Nii Mantse, Nii Moi We, Nii Borte We, Nii Adzin We, Nii Borkwei We, Nii Osokrono We, Nii Odarteitse We, and Nii Djenge The paramount chief of Nungua is King (Dr) Odaifio Welentsi III.

== Education ==
Education can be accessed in all levels in Nungua. Notable schools include:

=== Tertiary schools ===
- The Regional Maritime University
- Laweh Open University College
- GCB Bank Training School

=== Senior high schools ===
- Nungua Secondary School
- Nungua Presbyterian Secondary Commercial school
- St Peter's Anglican Senior High School
- Royal Technical College

=== Basic schools (public) ===
- Nungua Methodist '1' Basic School
- Nungua Methodist '2' Basic School
- St. Paul Anglican Basic Schools
- Nungua Lekma Basic Schools
- Nungua Presby Basic Schools.

== Transport ==
Nungua is accessible by rail, road and sea. It is served by a station on the eastern network of the national railway system. A bridge that was out of service for some time was repaired in 2009. Taxi, tro tro (mini buses), Metro Transit Buses are available on road. Canoes are also used by local folks along the beach.

== See also ==
- Railway stations in Ghana
- Elizabeth Afoley Quaye
