= Benita Sena Okity-Duah =

Ghanaian member of parliament for Ledzokuku constituency in the Greater Accra Region

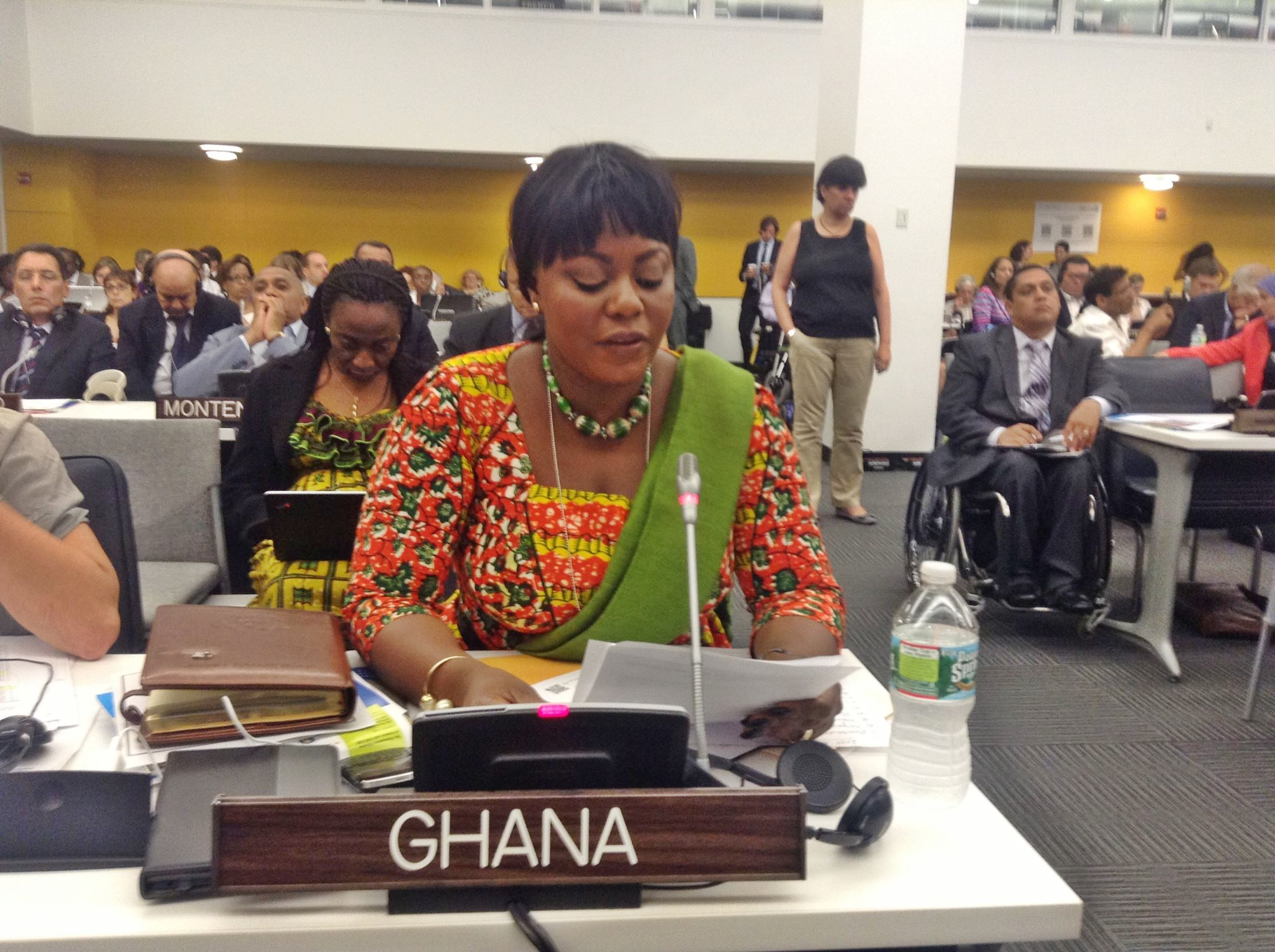
Benita Okity Duah at a UN session in New York in 2013

Benita Sena Okity-Duah (born 19 June 1976) is a Ghanaian fashion designer, politician and a former member of parliament for Ledzokuku constituency in the Greater Accra Region.

== Early life and education ==
She was born on 19 June 1976 in Anloga in the Volta Region of Ghana. She won the Miss Ghana pageant in 1997 at the age of 20 as a student. She attended Achimota School in Accra for her secondary school education. She then went on to study fashion at the London School of Fashion for four years.

== Career ==
She returned to Ghana in 2003 and has since carved a niche for herself in the Ghanaian fashion industry. She is the founder and CEO of LadyBird Fashions in Accra, Ghana.

== Politics ==
Benita resigned as the Women's Organizer of the National Democratic Congress of the Ledzokuku Constituency in the Greater Accra Region. She contested for the party primaries and defeated the then-incumbent member of parliament Nii Nortey Dua to represent the National Democratic Congress in the constituency. She won the election in 2012 to represent the people of Ledzokuku in the parliament of Ghana. She became the first ever Miss Ghana beauty queen to be elected as a member of parliament in Ghana. Additionally, she served as a Deputy Minister of Gender, Children and Social Protection of Ghana from April 2013 to June 2014. She was also the Deputy Minister of Fishery and Aquaculture of the Republic of Ghana. Benita lost her seat to Bernard Okoe-Boye who stood on the ticket of the New Patriotic Party in the 2016 Parliamentary election.

== Personal life ==
Benita is married to Steve Okity-Duah. Born Benita Golomeke, she was crowned Embassy pleasure Ms Ghana 1997. She is a Christian and a member of the Church of Jesus Christ of Latter-day Saints.
