= Eunice Ohui Ametor Williams =

Ghanaian politician and activist (1933–2023)

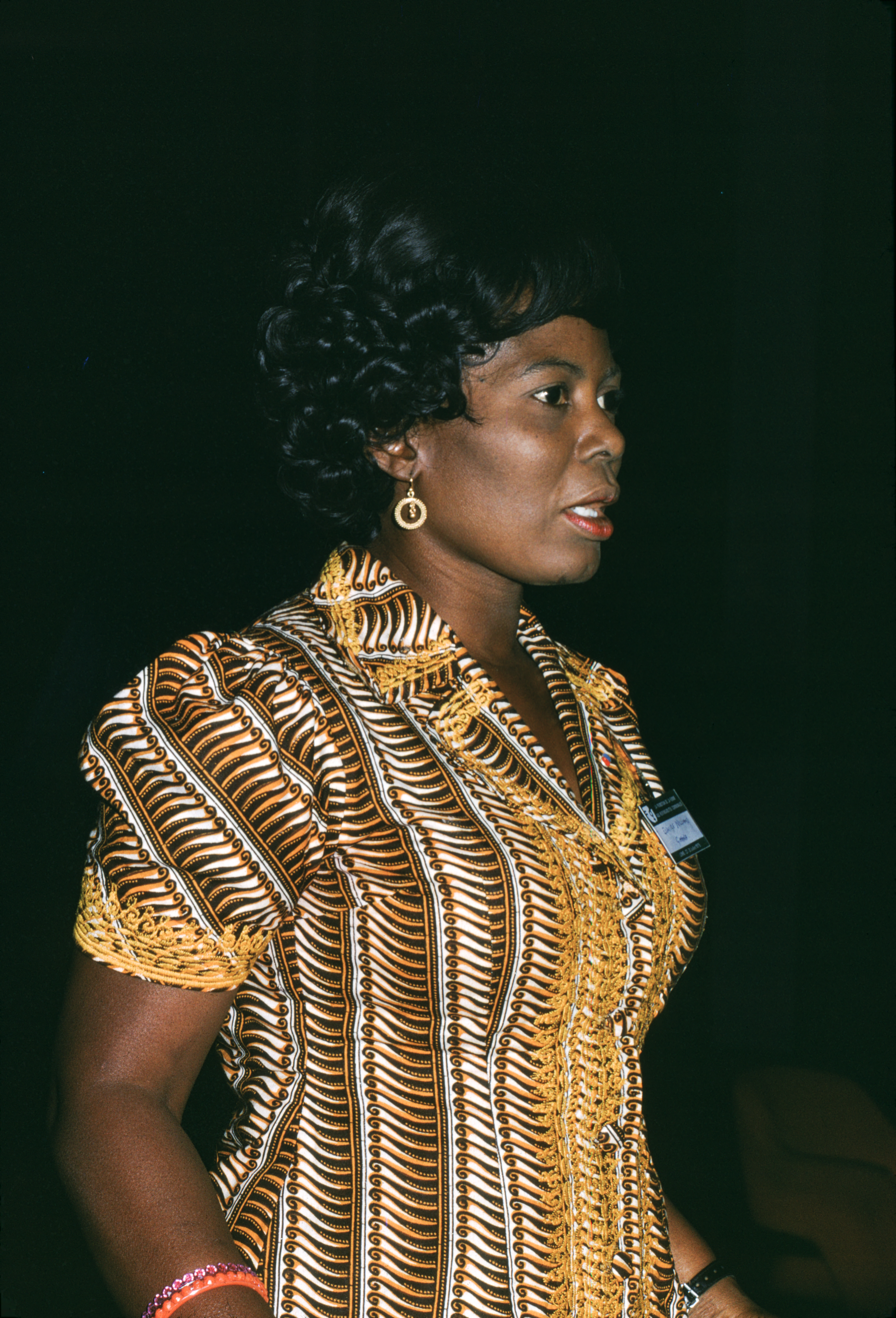
- Eunie in 1975

Member of the Ghana Parliament for Dangme East
- In office 1979 – 31 December 1981
- President: Hilla Limann

Personal details
- Born: Eunice Ohui Ametor Williams; 1933 Ada, Greater Accra Region, Gold Coast
- Died: 2023 (aged 89–90) Ghana
- Children: 5

Eunice Regina Ohui Ametor Williams (1933–2023) was a Ghanaian former politician, women's rights activist and the first female parliamentarian for Dangme East in the 1st Parliament of the 3rd Republic of Ghana who represented Ada Constituency, on the ticket of People's National Party, under the leadership of Hilla Limann from 24 September 1979 to 31 December 1981.

== Early life ==
Ametor Williams was born in 1933 and hailed from Ada in the Greater Accra Region of Ghana.

== Career ==
Ametor Williams was women's rights activist.

=== Political career ===
In 1979, she was elected to be the Member of Parliament for Dangme East in the 1st Parliament of the 3rd Republic of Ghana which represented Ada Constituency and also as first female parliamentarian.

== Personal life ==
Ametor Williams was married and had five children.

== Awards and honors ==
Ametor Williams was recognised and rewarded for her sterling role in the empowerment of women in the Ada Traditional Area.
