= Alfred Abayateye =

Ghanaian politician (born 1965)

Sege
- In office 7 January 2005 – 6 January 2013
- Preceded by: New Constituency
- Succeeded by: Christian Corleytey Otuteye

Personal details
- Born: Alfred Wallace Gbordzor Abayateye; 20 October 1965 (age 60)
- Party: National Democratic Congress
- Children: 6
- Education: University of Ghana
- Occupation: Politician
- Profession: Accountant

Alfred Wallace Gbordzor Abayateye (born 20 October 1965) is a Ghanaian banker and politician. He was the former member of parliament for the Sege constituency in the Greater Accra region of Ghana.

== Early life and education ==
Abayateye was born in 1965. He comes from Anyamam-Ada in the Greater Accra region of Ghana. He studied accounting in the University of Ghana, where he earned a Diploma in 1987.

== Personal life and career ==
Abayateye is a Christian and married with six children. He worships with the Presbyterian Church of Ghana. He is an Accountant by profession and currently the Deputy Manager of Bank of Ghana.

== Politics ==
Abayateye began his political career in 2004 when he became a member of parliament of the 4th parliament of the 4th republic of Ghana for the Sege constituency on the ticket of the National Democratic Congress. He won the Sege seat again in 2008 and became a 5th parliament of the 4th republic of Ghana, also on the ticket of the NDC. He won the seat with a total number of 12,451 votes out of the 19,182 valid votes cast making 64.9%. He lost his seat in the NDC 2012 parliamentary primaries to Christian Corletey Otuteye.
