= Dodowa Forest =

Protected area in Greater Accra Region, Ghana

Coordinates: 5.896°N 0.114°W

Dodowa Forest is a tourist site attraction at Dodowa in the Shai Osudoku District in the Greater Accra Region of Ghana. It covers an area of about 5 km^{2} (1.9 sq mi) and about 30 km (19 mi) northeast of the city of Accra. It is rich in resources and bush animals

The Tsenku Waterfalls also called also called Wuruduwurudu Falls are located in the Dodowa Forest. The Dodowa forest is the battle-field of the Kantamanso war which ended in 1826.

There is a giant Boabab tree at the edge of Dodowa where the ceremony was held to mark the end of conflict.
