= Sege (Ghana parliament constituency) =

Constituency in Ghana

- constituency for the Parliament of Ghana
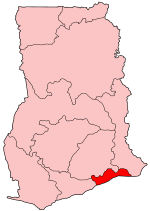
- District: Dangme East District
- Region: Greater Accra Region of Ghana

Current constituency
- Created: 2004
- Party: National Democratic Congress
- MP: Daniel Keshi Bessey

Sege is one of the constituencies represented in the Parliament of Ghana. It elects one Member of Parliament (MP) by the first past the post system of election. Daniel Keshi Bessey is the member of parliament for the constituency. Sege is located in the Ada West district of the Greater Accra Region of Ghana.

== Boundaries ==
The seat is located within the Ada West District of the Greater Accra Region of Ghana. It was formed prior to the 2004 December presidential and parliamentary elections by the division of the old Ada constituency into the new Sege and Ada constituencies.

== Members of Parliament ==
Election	Member	Party
2004	New Constituency	
2004	Alfred Wallace Gbordzor Abayateye	National Democratic Congress
2012	Christian Corletey Otuteye	National Democratic Congress
2016	Christian Corletey Otuteye	National Democratic Congress
2020	Christian Corletey Otuteye	National Democratic Congress
2024	Daniel Keshi Bessey	National Democratic Congress

== Elections ==
2016 Ghanaian general election: Sege Source: GhanaWeb
Party	Candidate	Votes	%	±%
National Democratic Congress	Christian Corletey Otuteye	13,269	53.48	−2.27
New Patriotic Party	Divine Otoo Agorhom	11,342	45.71	+2.56
Progressive People's Party	Inusah Doe Mortey	200	0.81	+.09
Majority		1,927	7.77	−4.83
Turnout		24,881		N/A

2012 Ghanaian general election: Sege Source: GhanaWeb
Party	Candidate	Votes	%	±%
National Democratic Congress	Christian Corletey Otuteye	13,792	55.75	−22.95
New Patriotic Party	Divine Otoo Agorhom	10,673	43.15	+24.85
Progressive People's Party	John Tetteh Kitcher	179	0.72	N/A
Convention People's Party	Johannes Nmonlotey Kirkfield	59	0.24	+1.66
National Democratic Party	Tettey Frank Korblah	179	0.72	N/A
Majority		3,119	12.6	−47.8
Turnout		24,737		N/A

2008 Ghanaian parliamentary election: Sege Source: Ghana Home Page
Party	Candidate	Votes	%	±%
National Democratic Congress	Alfred Wallace Gbordzor Abayateye	16,538	78.7	+23.8
New Patriotic Party	Divine Otoo Agorhom	3,843	18.3	+1.6
Convention People's Party	Victoria Korkor Kpodo	409	1.9	−26.4
People's National Convention	Joshua Puplampu Tetteh	225	1.1	
Majority		15,695	60.4	N/A
Turnout				N/A

2004 Ghanaian parliamentary election: Sege Source:Electoral Commission of Ghana
Party	Candidate	Votes	%	±%
National Democratic Congress	Alfred Gbordzor Abayateye	9,286	54.9	N/A
Convention People's Party	Wg. Cdr. (rtd) Patrick Sogbodjor Nelson	4,791	28.3	N/A
New Patriotic Party	Adzoteye Lawer Akrofi	2,830	16.7	N/A
Majority		4,495	26.6	N/A
Turnout		17,460	87.9	N/A

== See also ==
- List of Ghana Parliament constituencies
