= Gmayem Festival =

Festival in Ghana by Shai people

The Gmayem festival also known as Mgmayem festival is celebrated by the chiefs and peoples of Shai Osudoku District of Ghana. The Mgmayem festival is held annually and brings citizens of the area, both home and abroad, together to plan for ways to bring about development. The festival is also held in commemoration of the resolution of famine that afflicted the people centuries ago. At this time on the calendar of the traditional area, all funerals are suspended until the festival is over and urged the people to respect the arrangement and stiff punishment awaits anyone who goes against the order. The festival is said to celebrated in October every year but changes according to their traditional calendar.
