= Alex Tettey =

Alex Tettey is the name of:

- Alex Tettey-Enyo, Ghanaian politician
- Alexander Tettey, Norwegian footballer
