= Ada Kasseh =

Kasseh Ada Junction
- Town
- Nickname: Ada Junction
- Motto: In God We Trust
- Location in Ghana
- Coordinates: 5°50′N 0°39′E
- Country: Ghana
- Region: Greater Accra Region
- District: Ada East District
- Elevation: 6.6 ft (2 m)
- Time zone: UTC+ 0 ((UTC) Greenwich Mean Time : Dublin, Edinburgh, Lisbon, London)
  - Summer (DST): UTC+ 0 ((UTC) Greenwich Mean Time : Dublin, Edinburgh, Lisbon, London)
- Postal Code: KS

Kasseh is a town in the Ada East district, a district in the Greater Accra Region of Ghana. It is a major town located between Sege and Sogakope on the Accra-Aflao road. Kasseh has the biggest market in four districts (Ada West, Ada East, South Tongu and North Tongu) in its area. Kasseh is connected to almost all the towns and villages in the Ada East district by road or path. It is the most easily accessible town in the district. It is connected by road to the district capital town of Ada Foah and the Town called Big Ada.
