= Ningo Prampram District =

Ningo-Prampram District
- District
- Districts of Greater Accra Region

- Location of Ningo-Prampram District within Greater Accra
- Coordinates: 5°42′54″N 0°6′22″E
- Country: Ghana
- Region: Greater Accra
- Capital: Prampram

Government
  - District Executive: Raphael Uriel Nartey

Area
  - Total: 622.2 km^{2} (240.2 sq mi)

Population (2021)
  - Total: 204,673
- Time zone: UTC+0 (GMT)

Ningo Prampram District is one of the twenty-nine districts in Greater Accra Region, Ghana. Originally it was formerly part of the then-larger Dangme West District in 1988, which was created from the former Dangme District Council, until the southern part of the district was split off to create Ningo-Prampram District on 28 June 2012; thus the remaining part has been renamed as Shai-Osudoku District. The district assembly is located in the eastern part of Greater Accra Region and has Prampram as its capital town.

In November 2024, the Ningo Prampram District was elevated from district status to a municipal assembly, the Ningo Prampram Municipal Assembly.

== Background ==
The district is bordered to the north by Shai Osudoku District, to the east by Ada West District, to the south by the Gulf of Guinea, and to the west by Kpone Katamanso District. The total area of the district is 622.2 square kilometers.

According to the 2010 census, the population of the district was 70,923, with 33,514 males and 37,409 females. The most recent population count is 204, 673 based on the Ghana 2021 Population and Housing Census record is 87,393.
