= Comfort Doyoe Cudjoe-Ghansah =

Ghanaian politician

Hon. Comfort Doyoe Cudjoe-Ghansah MP
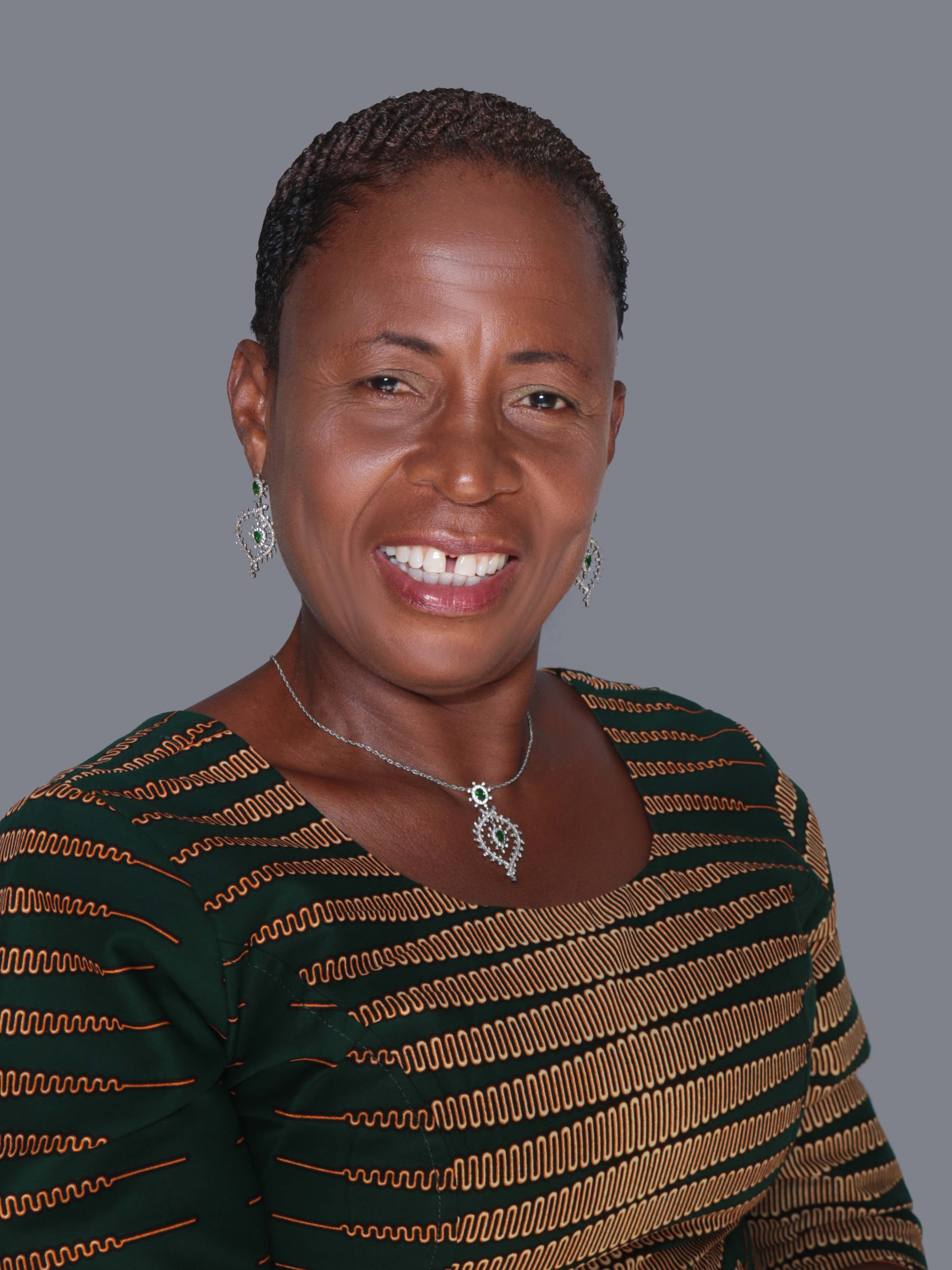

Member of the Ghana Parliament for Ada
- President: John Dramani Mahama
- President: John Atta Mills; John Mahama

Personal details
- Born: 3 November 1967 (age 58) Big Ada, Ghana
- Party: National Democratic Congress
- Children: Two
- Education: Ghana Institute of Journalism
- Profession: Stenographer, politician
- Portfolio: Social and Allied Institutions

Hon. Comfort Doyoe Cudjoe-Ghansah (born 3 November 1967) is a Ghanaian politician and the Member of Parliament for the Ada constituency. She served as the Minister of State in charge of Social and Allied Institutions. She was, as of 2023, the Deputy Government Chief Whip in the Parliament of Ghana.

== Early life and education ==
Cudjoe-Ghansah was born in Big Ada, Greater Accra Region on 3 November 1967. Comfort earned her diploma in stenography from the Royal Academy of Accounting, Accra in 1983. She earned a certificate in radio and television presentation from the Ghana Institute of Journalism in 2011.

== Political life ==
Cudjoe-Ghansah is the Member of Parliament for the Ada constituency, and sits on the committees for gender and children, and on foreign affairs. She was the Minister of State for the Ghanaian government on Social and Allied Institutions, having been named to the role in January 2013 by President of Ghana John Dramani Mahama. She denied accusations in 2014 that she had bribed assembly members to reject a District Chief Executive nominated by the President. Her name was cleared at an emergency meeting in the region.

She met with the Chinese Ambassador to Ghana later that year to discuss joint working on health and the well-being of children.

In 2016, she presented computers on behalf of the government to the head of the Ghanaian civil service, and over 500 desks to schools within her constituency. In a low key ceremony, she stressed the importance of education to Ghanaian citizens.

=== Politics ===
Cudjoe-Ghansah contested and won the National Democratic Congress parliamentary seat for the Ada Constituency in the Greater Accra Region. She won this seat during the 2016 Ghanaian general elections. Three other candidates, namely Kanor Saakey of the New Patriotic Party, Asupah Manasseh of the National Democratic Party and Daniel Katey Ossah of the Convention People's Party, also contested in the 2016 by-election of the Ada constituency held in 2016. Cudjoe-Ghansah won the election by obtaining 18,954 votes out of the 23,570 cast, representing 80.42 percent of total valid votes. In 2020, Cudjoe-Ghansah retained her seat, with 27,591 votes, gaining 82.14% of the votes cast for the Ada seat in Parliament.

Cudjoe-Ghansah was the incumbent Member of Parliament for Big Ada and was retained during the 7 December 2024 elections.

== Personal life ==
Cudjoe-Ghansah is a Christian, married with six children. She has spoken at events which have sought to bring religious cohesiveness to the area, praising the peace within Ghana.
