= Ada West District =

- District
- Districts of Greater Accra Region

- Location of Ada West District within Greater Accra
- Coordinates: 5°52′30″N 0°21′42″E
- Country: Ghana
- Region: Greater Accra
- Capital: Sege

Area
  - Total: 323.721 km^{2} (124.989 sq mi)

Population (2021)
  - Total: 76,087
- Time zone: UTC+0 (GMT)

Ada West District is one of the twenty-nine districts in Greater Accra Region, Ghana. Originally it was formerly part of the then-larger Dangme East District in 1988, which was created from the former Dangme District Council, until the western part of the district was split off to create Ada West District on 28 June 2012; thus the remaining part has been renamed as Ada East District. The district assembly is located in the eastern part of Greater Accra Region and has Sege as its capital town.

== Background ==
The district is bordered to the north by North Tongu District and South Tongu District (both in the Volta Region), to the east by Ada East District, to the south by the Gulf of Guinea, and to the west by Ningo Prampram District and Shai Osudoku District. The total area of the district is 323.721 square kilometers. According to the 2010 census, the population of the district is 59,124 with 28,579 males and 30,545 females. The current population according to 2021 population census is 76,087.
