= Amos Lawerh Buertey =

Ghanaian politician

MP for Ada
- In office 7 January 1993 – 6 January 2005
- President: John Agyekum Kufour

Personal details
- Born: 10 June 1954 (age 72) Ada, Greater Accra Region, Gold Coast (now Ghana)
- Party: National Democratic Congress
- Education: University of Ghana, Ghana School of Law
- Occupation: Politician
- Profession: Legal practitioner

Amos Lawerh Buertey (born 10 June 1954) is a Ghanaian politician, legal practitioner and a member of the Third Parliament of the Fourth Republic representing the Ada Constituency in the Greater Accra Region of Ghana.

== Early life and education ==
Lawerh was born on 10 June 1954, in Ada, a town in the Greater Accra Region of Ghana. He attended the Ghana School of Law and obtained a degree in Bachelor of Law(B.L) and (LL.B).

== Politics ==
Larweh was elected into the first parliament of the fourth republic of Ghana on 7 January 1993, after he was pronounced winner at the 1992 Ghanaian parliamentary election held on 29 December 1992.

She was a member of the Second Parliament of the Fourth Republic of Ghana and was elected as a member of parliament for the Ada Constituency on the Ticket of the National Democratic Congress during the December 1996 Ghanaian general elections.

He obtained 24,317 votes out of the 32,785 valid votes cast representing 57.70% over his opponents Apetorgbor Adinortey an individual candidate who also polled 4,466 votes representing 10.60% of the total votes cast and Patrick Nelson Sogbodjor of the Convention People's Party also polling 4,002 representing 9.50% of the total votes cast.

In 2000, he polled 13,317 votes out of the 24,364 valid votes casts representing 54.70%. Larwerh has been a member of Parliament from 1996 to 2004. He retired from politics in 2004 which paved the way Alex Narh Nartey-Enyo.

== Career ==
Larweh is a legal Practitioner and has worked as the Deputy Greater Accra Regional Minister.

== Personal life ==
Larwerh is a Christian.
