= Narh =

Narh may refer to:

- Alexander Narh Tettey-Enyo (born 1940), Ghanaian educationist
- Moses Narh (born 1986), Ghanaian-Nigerien football midfielder
