= Christian Corleytey Otuteye =

Ghanaian politician

Hon. Christian Corleytey Otuteye MP
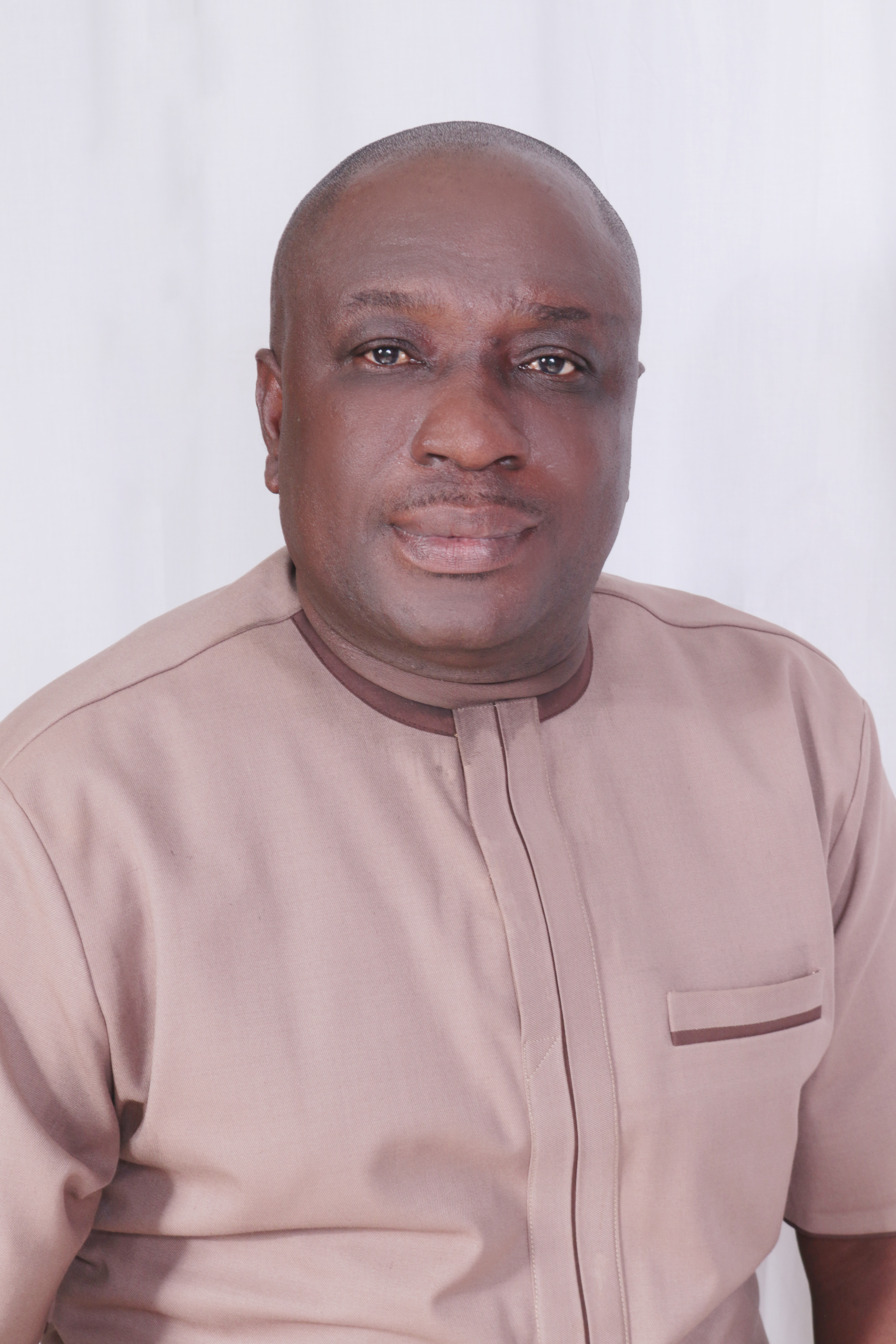

Member of the Ghana Parliament for Sege constituency

Personal details
- Born: 23 October 1973 (age 52)
- Party: National Democratic Congress

Christian Corleytey Otuteye (born October 23, 1973) is a Ghanaian politician and member of the Seventh Parliament of the Fourth Republic of Ghana representing the Sege constituency in the Greater Accra Region on the ticket of the National Democratic Congress.

== Early life and education ==
Otuteye was born on October 23, 1973, in Sege, a town in the Greater Accra Region of Ghana. He entered University of Kaiserslautern, Germany and obtained his Master of Science degree in Financial Mathematics in 2004.

== Political career ==
Otuteye is a member of the National Democratic Congress (NDC). In 2012, he contested for the Sege seat on the ticket of the NDC sixth parliament of the fourth republic and won. In the 2020 Ghanaian elections, he retained the Sege Constituency parliamentary seat.

=== 2016 election ===
Otuteye contested the Sege constituency parliamentary seat on the ticket of National Democratic Congress during the 2016 Ghanaian general election and won the election with 13, 269 votes representing 53.48% of the total votes. He was elected over Divine Otoo Agorhom of New Patriotic Party who polled 11, 342 votes which is equivalent to 45.71% and the parliamentary candidate for PPP Mortey Inusah Doe had 200 votes representing 0.81% of the total votes.

=== 2020 election ===
Otuteye was re-elected as a member of parliament for Sege constituency on the ticket of National Democratic Congress during the 2020 Ghanaian general election. He was elected with 17, 256 votes representing 52.50% of the total votes. He won the election over Lasi Eunice of New Patriotic Party who polled 15, 464 votes which is equivalent to 47.05% and the parliamentary candidate for Convention People's Party Johannes Nmonlotey Kirkfield had 146 votes representing 0.44% of the total votes.

=== 2023 Primaries ===
He was unable to lead the NDC in the constituency during the 2023 primaries, losing to Daniel Keshi Bessy, which ended his bid for a fourth term in Parliament. Otuteye received 206 votes, trailing behind Daniel K. Bessy, who secured 446 votes. Other contenders included Richard Kumadoe with 84 votes, Kwesi Abaya with 74 votes, Charles Otu Sebbie with 55 votes, and Fred Sebi-Doku with 14 votes.

== Personal life ==
Otuteye is a Presbyterian. He is married.

== Employment ==
- Lecturer in Quantitative Maths, Statistics and Research Methods, Ghana Institute of Management and Public Administration, Accra
- Member of Parliament (January 7, 2013–present; 2nd term)
