= Ada East District =

- District
- Districts of Greater Accra Region

- Location of Ada East District within Greater Accra
- Coordinates: 5°47′N 0°38′E
- Country: Ghana
- Region: Greater Accra
- Capital: Ada Foah

Government
  - District Executive: Sarah Dugbakie Pobee

Area
  - Total: 289.783 km^{2} (111.886 sq mi)

Population (2021)
  - Total: 76,411
- Time zone: UTC+0 (GMT)

Ada East District is one of the twenty-nine districts in Greater Accra Region, Ghana. Originally it was formerly the part of the then-larger Dangme East District in 1988, which was created from the former Dangme District Council, until the western part of the district was split off to create Ada West District on 28 June 2012; thus the remaining part has been renamed as Ada East District. The district assembly is located in the eastern part of Greater Accra Region and has Ada Foah as its capital town.

== Background ==
Ada East District is located within Latitudes 5°45 and 6°00 (North) and Longitudes 0°20 to 0°35 (East) respectively. The district is bordered to the north and east by North Tongu District (in the Volta Region), to the south by the Gulf of Guinea, and to the west by Ada West District. The total area of the district is 289.783 square kilometers. According to the 2010 census, the population of the district is 71,671 with 34,012 males and 37,659 females. Data available based on the record from Ghana Statistical Service shows the population as at 2019 is 88,321.
