= Katamanso War =

Conflict in 1826

Battle of Dodowa
- Part of Anglo-Ashanti wars
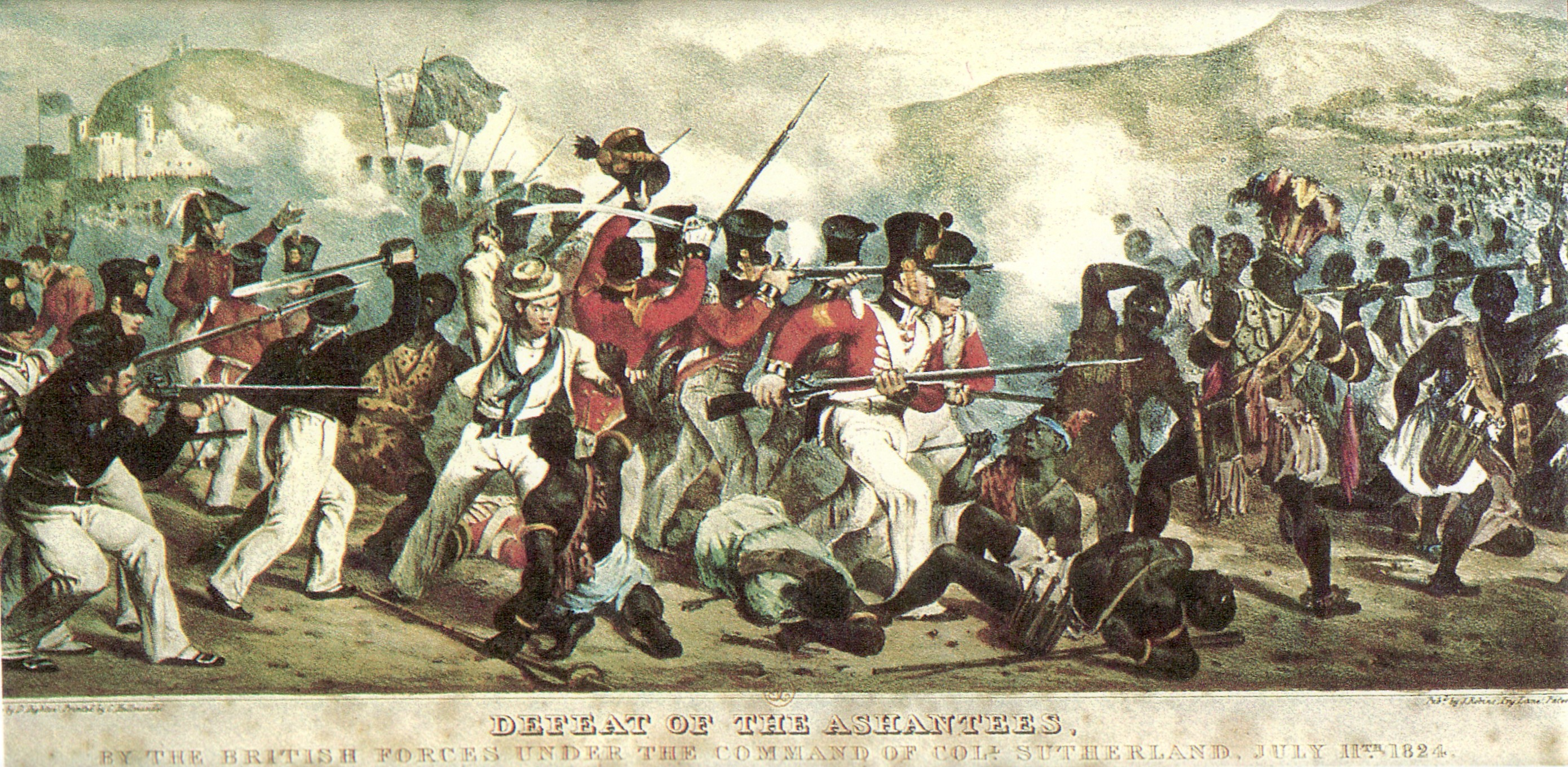
- Ashanti encounter on 11 July 1824
| Date | 7 August 1826 |
| Location | Near Accra |
| Result | Anglo-Danish-Dutch Victory |

Belligerents
| United Kingdom; Netherlands; Denmark | Ashanti Empire |

Commanders and leaders
| (Denmark) Richter Aarestrup (WIA) | Osei Yaw Akoto |

Strength
| (United Kingdom of Great Britain and Ireland) 6,500 men (Denmark) 5,000 men | 30,000; Reserves: 8,000; Royal guard: 2,000 |

Casualties and losses
| Minor | 5–6,000 killed |

The Katamanso War, also known as the Battle of Dodowa, was a war that several tribes united with the British, fought and prevented Ashantis from dominating the coast in 1826. Numerous tribes in the Gold Coast such as the Fantes, Ga, Akyems, Adas were led by the British army to fight the Ashantis. It is classified as one of the "Anglo-Ashanti Wars" according to historical evidence at the National Archives.

== History ==
The Ashanti King or Asantehene (Osei Yaw Akoto) at that time, furious at the Ga-Adangbe for aiding the Fantes in the Battle of Nsamankow of 1824, proposed to punish them. He decided to pursue them, even if they escape into the belly of kanfra (a small flat fish).

On 7 August 1826, the war began also known as the "Battle of Dodowa". However he met a coalition of other indigenous forces allied with the Ga-Adangbe of Prampram, Ningo and Ada people under their Monarch King Tackie Kome. British, Dutch and Danish forces all together not more than 60, aided in the war with new weapons after an attack on Cape Coast in July 1824. The Asantehene amassed an army of 40,000. An alliance of British with Ga-Adangbe, Fanti, Denkyira, Akwamu and Akyems at Katamanso near Dodowa faced the Ashanti army. The Akyems were led by the Okyenhemea, Nana Afia Dokuaa, the only woman ruler of a major state. But the allied forces fought gallantly and overcame the Ashanti Army with a devastating victory which paralyzed the Ashanti Empire and was a factor in the loss of its former glory. This contributed to the British power and prestige rise on the coast. The Ashantis held their position for nine hours (6 AM to 3 PM).

=== Effects of the war ===
The effects of the war included:

- Smooth trading activities with less fear of invasion.
- Unity of Ga-Adangbe.
- Accra became famous and their influence spread.
- Foreign countries and strangers traded with the coast for commercial purpose.

==== Historical facts ====
The King was made to swear an oath as the 'ka ntam' (Akan for swear), 'na su' (Akan for cry) = Corrupted into Katamanso.

The hair style worn by the Asante women called 'Gyese Nkran', (except Akra), vulgarized as Densinkran, was introduced to mourn the Asante dead in the Katamanso war.
