= Shai Osudoku District =

Shai-Osudoku District
- District
- Districts of Greater Accra Region

- Location of Shai-Osudoku District within Greater Accra
- Coordinates: 5°37′31.99″N 0°5′23.82″W
- Country: Ghana
- Region: Greater Accra
- Capital: Dodowa

Government
  - District Executive: Fred Offei

Area
  - Total: 1,522 km^{2} (588 sq mi)

Population (2021)
  - Total: 105,610
- Time zone: UTC+0 (GMT)
- Website: Official Website

Shai Osudoku District is one of the twenty-nine districts in Greater Accra Region, Ghana. Originally it was formerly part of the then-larger Dangme West District in 1988, which was created from the former Dangme District Council, until the southern part of the district was split off to create Ningo-Prampram District on 28 June 2012; thus the remaining part has been renamed as Shai-Osudoku District. The Shai Osudoku District Assembly is located in the eastern part of Greater Accra Region and has Dodowa as its capital town, which is about 39 km from the regional capital, Accra.

== Notable places ==
The main festival of the Shai Osudoku District is the Ngmayem festival. Notable tourist attraction found in the district are the Chenku Water Falls, Dodowa Forest, Shai Osudoku District Hospital, Asutsuare Rice Farms, Exotics Banana Farm and Shai Hills Resource Reserve. The Stone Lodge which serves visitors to the district is located at Osuwem Junction.

There are other notable institutions like Dodowa Health Research Centre, The Forest Hotel and the Shai Osudoku District Hospital.

== See also ==
- Eleme
