= Ada (Ghana parliament constituency) =

One of the constituencies represented in the Parliament of Ghana

- constituency for the Parliament of Ghana
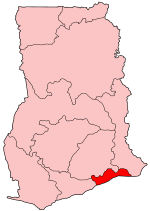
- District: Dangme East District
- Region: Greater Accra Region of Ghana

Current constituency
- Party: National Democratic Congress
- MP: Comfort Doyoe Cudjoe-Ghansah

Ada is one of the constituencies represented in the Parliament of Ghana. It elects one member of parliament by the first-past-the-post system of election. The Ada constituency is located in the Dangme East District of the Greater Accra Region of Ghana.

== Boundaries ==
The seat is located entirely within the Accra Metropolitan Area of the Greater Accra Region of Ghana.

== Members of Parliament ==
First elected	Member	Party	Tenure
1954	Charles Ofoe Cudeto Amattey	Convention People's Party	1954 – 1956
1956	Andrews Kwabla Puplampu	Convention People's Party	1956 – 1966
1969	Emmanuel Kabutey Narter-Olaga	National Alliance of Liberals	1969 – 1972
1979	Eunice Ametor-Williams	People's National Party	1979 – 1981
1992	Amos Lawerh Buertey	National Democratic Congress	1993 – 2004
2004	Alex Narh Tettey-Enyo	National Democratic Congress	2005 – 2012
2012	Comfort Doyoe Cudjoe-Ghansah	National Democratic Congress	2013 – to date

== Elections ==
2008 Ghanaian parliamentary election: Ada Sources:Ghana Home Page
Party	Candidate	Votes	%	±%
National Democratic Congress	Alex Narh Tettey-Enyo	16,538	79.5	4.0
New Patriotic Party	Kofi Plahar	3,843	18.5	−0.5
Convention People's Party	Gordon Chiatey Amenya	409	2.0	−3.5
Majority		12,695	61.0	4.5
Turnout				—

2004 Ghanaian parliamentary election: Ada Sources:Electoral Commission of Ghana
Party	Candidate	Votes	%	±%
National Democratic Congress	Alex Narh Tettey-Enyo	15,039	75.5	—
New Patriotic Party	Kabutey Caesar	3,787	19.0	—
Convention People's Party	Richard Ofotsu Apronti	1,092	5.5	—
Majority		11,252	56.5	—
Turnout				—

== See also ==
- List of Ghana Parliament constituencies
