= Dangme East District =

Dangme West District
- Former District
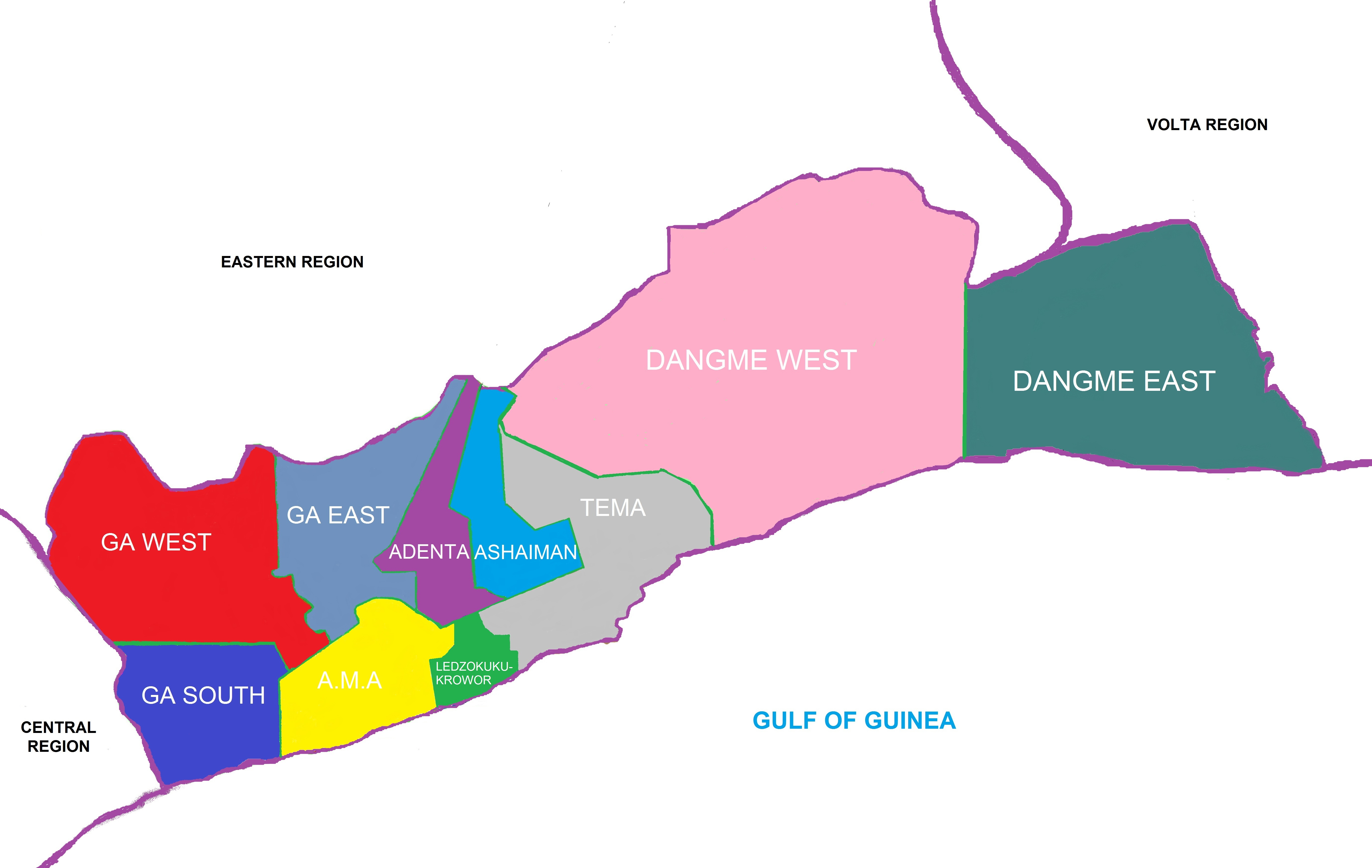
- Districts of Greater Accra Region

- Location of Dangme East District within Greater Accra
- Coordinates: 5°46′N 0°37′E
- Country: Ghana
- Region: Greater Accra
- Capital: Ada Foah

Government
  - District Executive: Hon. Rex Daniel Wusah

Area
  - Total: 909 km^{2} (351 sq mi)

Population (2012)
  - Total: —
- Time zone: UTC+0 (GMT)
- ISO 3166 code: GH-AA-DE

Dangme East District is a former district that was located in Greater Accra Region, Ghana. Originally created as an ordinary district assembly in 1988, which was created from the former Dangme District Council. However on 28 June 2012, it was split off into two new districts: Ada East District (capital: Ada Foah) and Ada West District (capital: Sege). The district assembly was located in the eastern part of Greater Accra Region and had Ada Foah as its capital town.

== Background ==
It used to cover a surface of 909 km². Major towns in the district were Big Ada and Ada Kasseh. Ada Foah, which was the district capital, is located at the beach and river estuary. Most of the inhabitants (85.9%) belonged to the cultural group of the Dangme. It had a population of 71,671.

== History ==
According to oral history, the people of Ada, who are called Dangmeli, are believed to have migrated from Tagologo near Shai-Osodoku in the Dangme West District. It has been estimated that several hundred years ago they initially settled at a place called Okorwhem in the south-western part of the district. After several years of inhabitancy, part of the people decided to move downwards to Togbloku and settled there. While staying at Togbloku, the founder of the Kudzragbe clan, Torgbe Adela Atsu discovered that Big Ada was a good place to stay and the Dangmeli and Togbloku people inhabited the area.

Ada, according to oral history backed by many historical edifices, was founded by an Adangbe man known as Lomowe jointly with an Ewe man known as Togbe Havi Etse (who is also the founder of the Kudzragbe clan of Ada). There exist authorities of oral history (concerning this particular facts) in Ada who could be contacted for further verification. The current head of the Kudzrabe clan at Ada, Nene Havi Atsu VI could be contacted, since he is a direct descendant of Torgbe Havi Etse.In the olden days the people of Ada spoke two languages, i.e., Ewe and Agdangbe. Ewe language was mainly spoken in the evening/night whiles Dangbe was spoken during the day.

== Geography and climate ==
=== Location and size ===
The Dangme East District is part of the Greater Accra Region. It is bordered on the west by the Dangme West District, on the east and north by Keta district, South Tongu and North Tongu (Volta Region) and on the south by the Gulf of Guinea.

=== Infrastructure ===
The Dangme East District is conveniently located off the main connecting road between the Ghanaian capital of Accra and the Togolese capital of Lomé. Its proximity to Accra (about 120 km distance) and the good connection with public transport make the district an obvious holiday and short-trip location. The quality of the road is good compared to similar roads around the country. Away from the main roads, tourists without their own transportation can get around easily with car or motorcycle taxis or boats. Since there are no schedules or regular routes transport is less predictable but in general a lot faster and better adjusted to the passengers needs.

Coming from the Volta Region, passengers can cross the river with the ferry that connects Anyanui and Ada Foah twice on market day every Wednesday.

Electricity and water supply was broadly introduced in the district in the 1990s which accelerated tourism development considerably.

=== Nature ===
The district's coconut palm fringed coastline is 45 kilometers long and provides a living to many people that are employed in fishing and fish processing. However, this coastline is constantly being eroded by the strong tidal waves that are washing away or threatening several villages that are located close to the beach. In order to solve this problem, the construction of a sea defense wall is under way since 2010.

The long, sandy beaches are certainly some of the most important tourist attractions. However, there are certain obstacles such as the lack of toilets in the villages close to the beach and the consequence of using the beach as such. Also, garbage – mostly plastic – is piling up at the beach, some of it disposed there, some washed up from the sea by the tide.

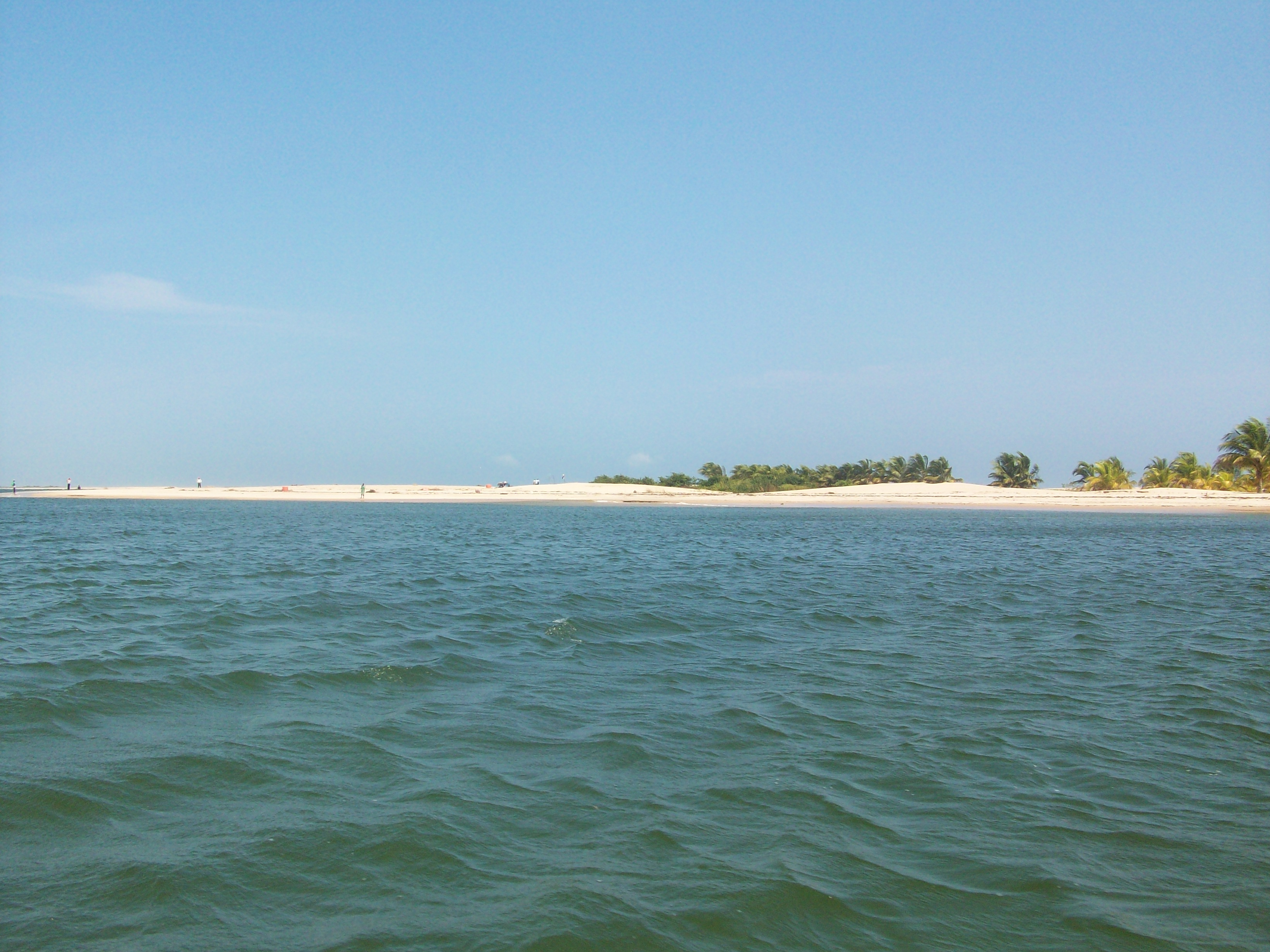
Volta River Estuary

Apart from the sandy beaches, another natural attraction in the district is the Volta River and its estuary. The Volta River forms the eastern boundary of the district before it reaches the Gulf of Guinea. The islands in the river and in the estuary are a wildlife paradise: marine turtles, birds, crocodiles and monkeys are some of the animals living there. The mangrove vegetation in the salty parts of the estuary is another attraction and an important ecosystem. It is however endangered by human activity along with rare animals that are often hunted down.

The estuary also offers the best conditions for water sports like sailing, canoeing, fishing, water skiing, wake boarding and jet skiing.

Another important water body and one of the most important salt mining areas in the country is the Songor Lagoon. Additional to visiting it and learning about salt mining it serves as a base for birdwatchers.

=== Climate ===
Temperatures are high throughout the year, ranging from 23 to 33 °C, but the sea has a cooling effect. Rainfall is generally heavy during the major seasons between March and September. However, during the harmattan season the area is very dry with no rainfall at all. In general, humidity is very high due to the proximity of the sea, the Volta River and other water bodies.

== Demographics ==
Because 82% of the population lives in rural areas the pressure on the land and on the resources is growing. Consequently, many young people are moving away from the district for the lack of job opportunities. The development of the district towards a tourism destination is expected to help reducing youth unemployment and change this migration trend. For this purpose special Youth Employment Programs have been put in place to provide youth with community jobs such as teaching assistants, health workers, environmental aids and agricultural workers.

The majority of the population works in the informal sector. Apart from commercial salt mining companies that employ about 300 people at the Songor lagoon there are no bigger companies employing the local population.

=== Social security ===
There is no social security system in place that would help people with no income such as unemployed, children and senior citizens. So far, the traditional system of family support is still working in rural areas but gradually losing its basis as more and more young people move to the cities and turn away from the extended families, having only few children themselves.

=== Health ===
To combat the major health issues in the country a National Health Insurance Scheme (Ghana) was introduced in 2003 to ensure that all inhabitants have the possibility to contract a health insurance at a reasonable price for 14 Cedis/year (about 7 Euro) and be covered for general treatment. Only 3 years after the implementation, already 56% of the inhabitants of the district are covered by the health insurance.

=== Education ===
Although there is a high number of schools in the district, in the recent years a lack of pre-school facilities could be noted. This has been addressed and plans are in place to solve this problem.

=== Language ===
The local language in the Dangme East District is Dangme, also called Adangme. It is a Kwa language and is spoken by people in the Dangme East and Dangme West District. English is also spoken by nearly everyone since it is the official language of the country. Many people also speak Twi, and some Ewe (to communicate with neighboring people of the Volta Region who may speak Ewe).

== Culture ==
The district capital Ada Foah, is located at the beach and river estuary. Ada Foah is also the major town and serves as the economic hub for the district. The Other major towns in the district are Big Ada and Ada Kasseh.

The biggest event in the district is the annual Asafotufiam festival. Funerals also play a big role with their loud and colorful celebrations that take place every weekend. In general, religion and its practice – either Christian or traditional – are present in everyday life and can be witnessed by tourists. The festivities also include Traditional African shrines, Traditional African priest and celebrations.

Local handicrafts such as basket weaving, pottery and rum distilling are carried out at various places in the district and sold on the markets. Salt mining was once the main economic activities of the indigenous till part of the Songho was sold to a private company. The art of building specially shaped coffins is a common and unique practice carried out in the district. Depending on the profession of the deceased, the coffin can be of the shape of a fish (fisherman), book (teacher) or sewing machine (tailor), to name but a few. Local food like Makun ke luei - banku and tilapia, Otim - Kenkey, and sometimes Fufu can be purchased at numerous places in the district. As in the whole country the people are well known for their hospitality and openness towards strangers.

== Tourism ==
- Asafotufiami Festival
- Shrines
- Traditional handicraft such as basket weaving, fishing, pottery, rum distillery, special coffins, tailors
- Old trading fort at the seaside
- Presbyterian church and missionary cemetery
- Markets in Kasseh and Ada Foah
- Beaches along the coast and the river
- Volta River Estuary
- Songor lagoon
- Sea turtle watching
- Monkey and bird watching
- Annual boat race on the Volta River

== Sources ==
- "Districts of Ghana". Statoids.
- GhanaDistricts.com
