= Dangme West District =

- Former District
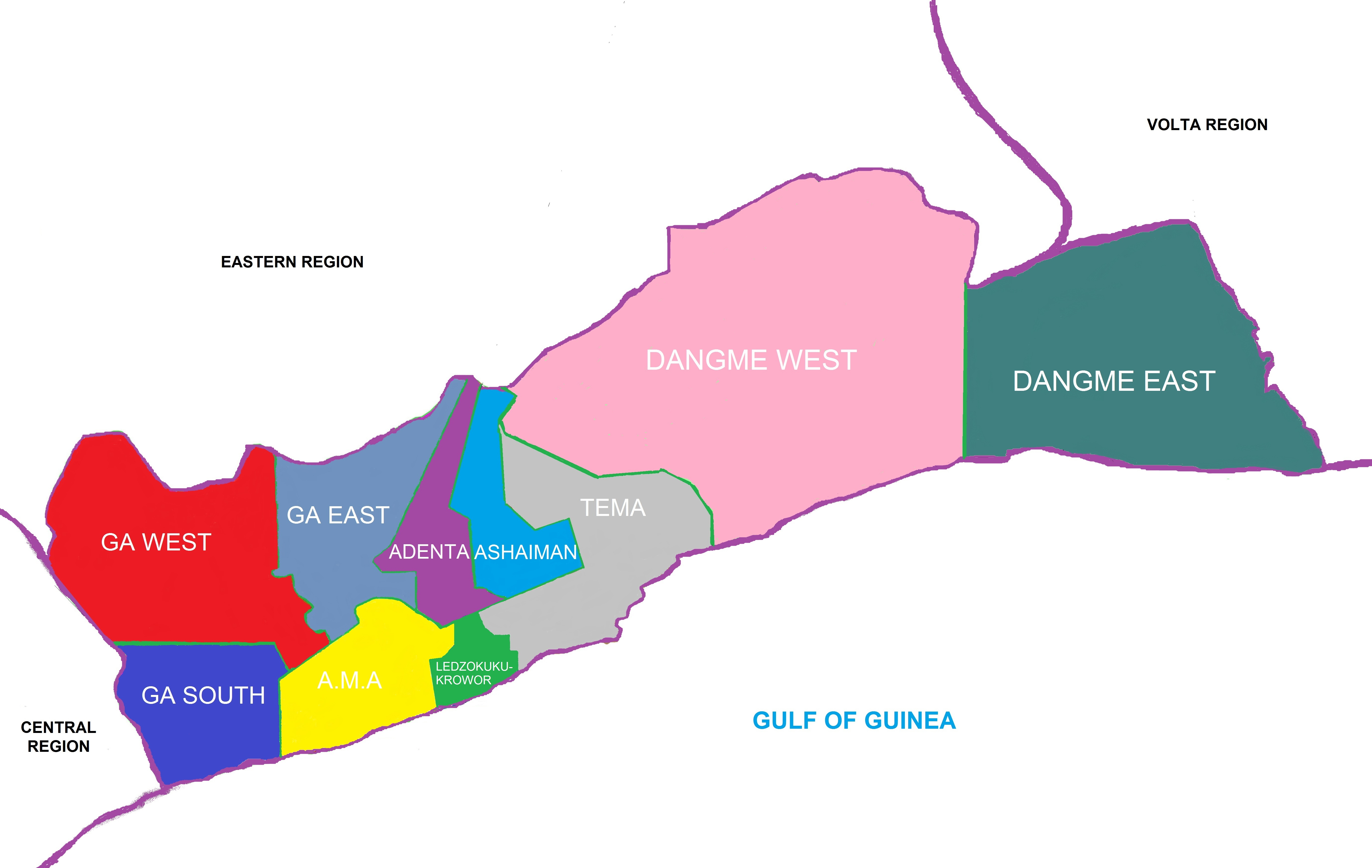
- Districts of Greater Accra Region

- Location of Dangme West District within Greater Accra
- Coordinates: 5°37′31.99″N 0°5′23.82″W
- Country: Ghana
- Region: Greater Accra
- Capital: Dodowa

Government
  - District Executive: Daniel Akuffo

Area
  - Total: 1,522 km^{2} (588 sq mi)

Population (2012)
  - Total: 64,000
- Time zone: UTC+0 (GMT)
- ISO 3166 code: GH-AA-__

Dangme West District is a former district that was located in Greater Accra Region, Ghana. Originally created as an ordinary district assembly in 1988, which was created from the former Dangme District Council. However on 28 June 2012, it was split off into two new districts: Shai-Osudoku District (capital: Dodowa) and Ningo-Prampram District (capital: Prampram). The district assembly was located in the eastern part of Greater Accra Region and had Dodowa as its capital town.

== See also ==
- Eleme
