= Tsenku Waterfall =

Tsenku Falls
- Interactive map of Tsenku Falls
- Location: Dodowa, Greater Accra Region, Ghana
- Type: Chute

Tsenku Falls

Tsenku Falls is a waterfall located near Dodowa in the Greater Accra Region of Ghana

Tsenku waterfall drops from a height of about 250 feet and is running on stratified rocks into a cool and clean pool with a large tilapia population.

The Tsenku Waterfalls, also referred to as Wuruduwurudu, is within the Po stream valley is joined by two other streams "Sanyade" and "Popotsi" before it meanders into the sea.
