= Eleme, Ghana =

Eleme
- Town
- Interactive map of Eleme
- Country: Ghana
- Administrative Region: Greater Accra Region
- District: Dangme West District

Eleme is a town at 6.0667°N 0.9°E in Dangme West District, Greater Accra Region, Ghana, near the mouth of the Volta River, and between Bokuve and Heluvi.
