= Alex Tettey-Enyo =

Ghanaian educationalist and politician

Hon. Alexander Narh Tettey-Enyo

Member of the Ghana Parliament for Ada
- Incumbent
- Assumed office Jan 2005
- Preceded by: Amos Lawerh Buertey
- Majority: 12,695

Minister for Education
- In office Feb 2009 – Jan 2011
- President: John Atta Mills
- Preceded by: Dominic Fobi
- Succeeded by: Betty Mould-Iddrisu

Personal details
- Born: 6 June 1940 (age 86) Akuse, Ghana
- Party: National Democratic Congress
- Children: 5
- Education: Presbyterian Boys' Secondary; University of Cape Coast
- Occupation: Educationist

Alexander Narh Tettey-Enyo (born 6 June 1940) is an educationist and politician. He has been the Member of Parliament for Ada since 2005 and the Ghanaian Minister for Education between 2009 and 2011.

== Early life and education ==
Alex Tettey-Enyo was born at Akuse in the Greater Accra Region of Ghana. He started his primary education at the Akuse Methodist Primary School in 1946. In 1948, he continued at the James Town Accra Methodist Primary School and completed at the Somanya Methodist Primary/Middle School where he studied between 1949 and 1953. His secondary education started at the Volta District Secondary School, Odumase Krobo in 1954. He continued at the Presbyterian Boys' Secondary also at Odumase Krobo between 1956 and 1957. He completed the post-secondary teachers course at the Wesley College, Kumasi between 1959 and 1960. He attended the Kwame Nkrumah University of Science and Technology during 1961 and 1962 and then proceeded to the University of Cape Coast where he studied between 1962 and 1965, obtaining the Bachelor of Arts degree in education. He attended the University of Science and Technology, Kumasi (1961-1962) and the University College of Cape Coast (1963-1965).

== Career ==
=== Education ===
He started his first teaching job at the Yilo State School at Somanya in 1958. His next job was at the Ghanata Secondary School, Dodowa. After his university education, during which he was President of the national socialist students' organisation (Ghanaso), he joined a group of students from the Kwame Nkrumah Ideological Institute who went to the GDR's central party school in Berlin for extended study. Whilst there, he was approached after the fall of Kwame Nkrumah to return to Ghana by supporters of the deposed President to return to work on his behalf, but declined. The evidence for his time in Berlin is in the Bundesarchiv, Berlin Lichterfelde, SAPMO-BArch, DY 30, IV A 2/ 9.09/ 125. He returned to his former school in 1966, eventually becoming Assistant Headmaster from 1971 to 1974. In 1982, he was appointed head of Ada Secondary School, a position he held until 1990. He was made the Director of Education for the Dangme East District in the Ghana Education Service (GES) in 1990. In 1991, he became Director for Secondary Education at the headquarters of the GES in 1991. Four years later, he was the Director for Manpower and Training at GES headquarters. In 1996, he became the Deputy Director-General of the Ghana Education Service and then the Acting Director General from 2001.

=== Politics ===
Tettey-Enyo acted as District Secretary for the Dangme East District Assembly in 1990. He first stood for parliament in the Ghanaian parliamentary election in December 2004 on the ticket of the National Democratic Congress, entering parliament in January 2005. In 2009, President John Atta Mills appointed Tettey-Enyo as Minister for Education in his government. Tettey-Enyo's term as minister ended in 2011 following the cabinet reshuffle by President Mills.

== Family ==
Tettey-Enyo is married with five children.

== Hobbies ==
Tettey-Enyo's hobbies include reading, stamp collection, swimming and debating.

== See also ==
- List of Mills government ministers
- Ada constituency

Parliament of Ghana
Preceded by Amos Lawerh Buertey	Member of Parliament for Ada; 2005 – present	Incumbent
Political offices
Preceded by Dominic Fobi	Minister for Education; 2009 – 2011	Succeeded by Betty Mould-Iddrisu
