= Dodowa =

Town in the Greater Accra Region of Ghana

- District Capital
- Location in Ghana
- Coordinates: 5°53′N 0°7′E
- Country: Ghana
- Region: Greater Accra Region
- District: Dangme West District
- Elevation: 554 ft (169 m)

Dodowa is a town located in the Greater Accra Region of Ghana, it is the district capital of Dangme West district, now Shai Osudoku District.

The city is 39 km from the capital city, Accra. The notable tourist site found there is the Dodowa Forest. They celebrate the Ngmayemi Festival. There is a historical forest where the Katamanso War ended. The Tsenku Waterfall is located in Dodowa Forest.

There is also the Dodowa Health Research Centre which majors in health related researches and implementation researches.

== Education ==
There are several schools in Dodowa. The Ghana Christian International High School (GCIHS) is located about 6 km on the main Dodowa-Afienya road. The school is made up of a Junior High School and a Senior High School. One of the country's oldest Senior High Schools known as Ghanata Senior High School founded in 1936 can also be found in the town.

== Institutions in Dodowa ==
Government institutions located in Dodowa includes the Shai-Osudoku District Hospital managed by the Ghana Health Service is situated in the Dodowa town. It was established in 1970 and has metamorphosed from Health post to health center and finally to a district hospital in mid-2009.

Some of the major government utility companies operating in the town that extend its services to the neighbouring villages are the Ghana Water Company Limited, a company fully owned by the state responsible for potable water supply to all urban communities in Ghana. The Ghana National Fire Service provides an efficient and valued fire and rescue service to meet statutory required in Act 537 and public expectation. in charge of organising public fire education programmes to create and sustain awareness of the hazards of fire, heighten the role of the individual in the prevention of fire and provide technical advice for building plans with regard to machinery and structural layouts to facilitate escape from fire, rescue operations, and fire management. The Electricity Company of Ghana for the Dodowa district to provide electricity services to support growth and development. Shai-Osudoku District Assembly exists to create the enabling environment for the provision of services for the total development of the District in collaboration with all stakeholders.

== Regional House of Chiefs ==
The Greater Accra Regional House of Chiefs is located at Dodowa
