= Sege (town) =

- District Capital
- Location in Ghana
- Coordinates: 5°52′30″N 0°21′42″E
- Country: Ghana
- Region: Greater Accra Region
- District: Ada West District

Population (2010)
  - Total: 5,990

Sege is a town located in the Greater Accra Region of Ghana, it is the district capital of Ada West District. According to the Ghana Statistical Service's 2010 Population and Housing Census, the population of Sege was 5,990.
