= Dangme District =

- Former District Council
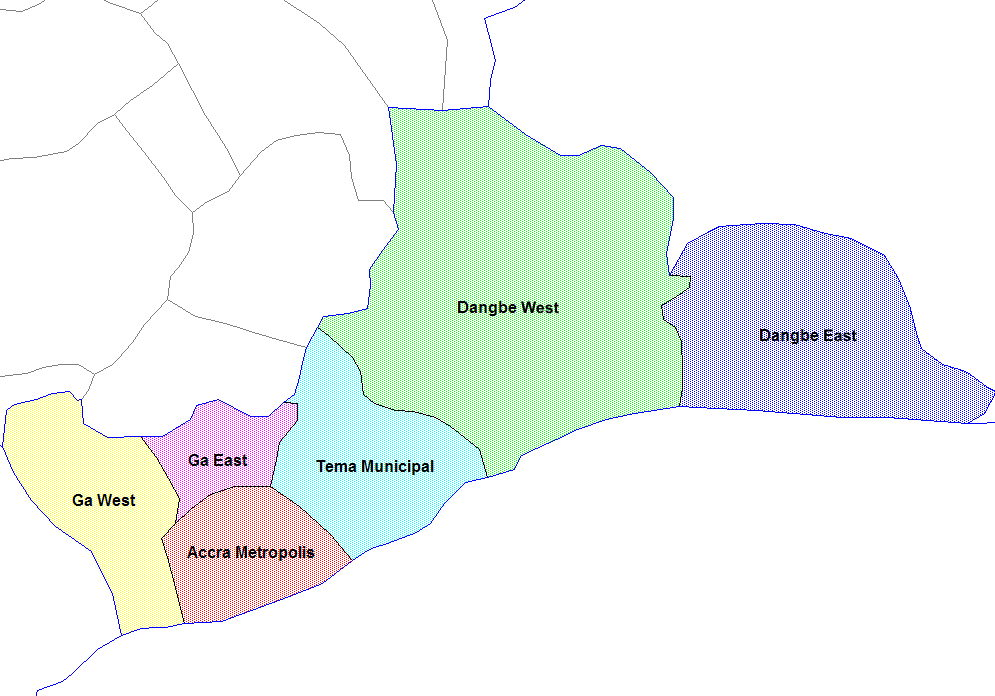
- Districts of Greater Accra Region

- Location of Dangme District within Greater Accra
- Coordinates: 5°47′N 0°38′E
- Country: Ghana
- Region: Greater Accra
- Capital: Ada Foah
- Time zone: UTC+0 (GMT)
- ISO 3166 code: GH-AA-DM

Dangme District is a former district council that was located in Greater Accra Region, Ghana. Originally created as an ordinary district assembly in 1975, in 1988, it was split into two new district assemblies: Dangme East District (capital: Ada Foah) and Dangme West District (capital: Dodowa). The district assembly was located in the eastern part of Greater Accra Region and had Ada Foah as its capital town.
