= Big Ada =

- Village
- Location in Ghana
- Coordinates: 5°49′N 0°37′E
- Country: Ghana
- Region: Greater Accra Region
- District: Ada East District

Government

Area
  - Water: 92,456.0 sq mi (239,460.0 km^{2})
- Elevation: 6.6 ft (2 m)
  - Density: 322/sq mi (124.3/km^{2})
- Website: https://ghana.places-in-the-world.com/2303041-place-big-ada.html

Big Ada is a town in the Ada East District, a district in the Greater Accra Region of Ghana. The settlement lies along the road from Ada Kasseh to the district capital Ada Foah, just off the Accra-Aflao motorway.

== History ==
The Ada people first migrated from Ancient Egypt, then to Nigeria in a town called Ile-Ife, through Benin among the Fon People then to Togo, and finally to Big Ada in the Greater Accra Region (present day Ghana). Big Ada was one of the first places the Ada people settled. From there, they spread out to different settlements, but always perceived Big Ada as their home base.

The village that is located on the riverbank of the Volta used to be an important trading center, profiting from the river's fantastic location. From there, goods were transported to the hinterland by canoe past the Shai and Akwamu mountains. The economic activities reached a peak around 1901 when a transportation system called the Volta River Transport System was launched. Ada's decline started with the construction of the harbor sea port in Takoradi that made the transport on the Volta River unnecessary. Today, Ada is not as popular as far as social life and economic activities are concerned. Hardly any traces of physical structures such as factories and shops remain.

== Services ==
Big Ada consists of two main roads passing through the town and a highway at the outskirts of the town leading straight to the estuary with many smaller paths in between. The area has some guesthouses, hotels such as Aqua Safari Resort Treasure Island etc.. many chop bars and spots, a police station, Fire service station and a small library. The local radio station Radio Ada that broadcasts in the local language Dangme has its office just outside Big Ada and a newly established radio station Eagle Fm which broadcast in English and the local language [danmge] Big Ada is also the office of the paramount King of Ada Nene Abram Kabu Akuaku who is head over the various local chiefs.

== Asafotufiami Festival ==
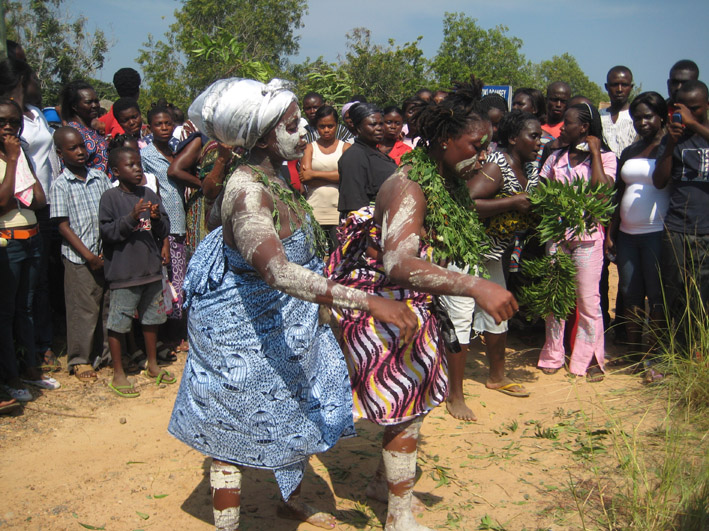
Asafotufiami Festival

Ada is the venue of the well-known, annual Asafotufiami festival that takes place starting from the first Thursday in the first week of August and is one of the biggest events in the district. The event celebrates ancient wars(firing of musketry) and draws a big crowd of people to Ada. Historically, the Asafotufiami is a remembrance of ancient wars with neighboring tribes such as the Ewe. The "Asafotu" are companies of warriors who fire their muskets in celebration. These days, the festival is a grand homecoming for the Ada and African diaspora. As many of the Ada's were enslaved during the transatlantic Slave trade.

The celebration starts on a Thursday in the first week of August and goes on until the following week. Young men are initiated and instructed in the ancient tactics of warfare, the paramount chief of Ada Nene Abram Kabu Akuaku the chiefs of the various clans and invited guests such as the president or vice president of Ghana and invited chiefs and kings from other regions of the country gather for processions and speeches and parties and celebrations continue throughout the whole festival. On Sunday, there is an open-air church service. The following days are filled with beach parties, boat races, river excursions and football matches.
