= Ada Foah =

Ada Foah Ada
- District Capital
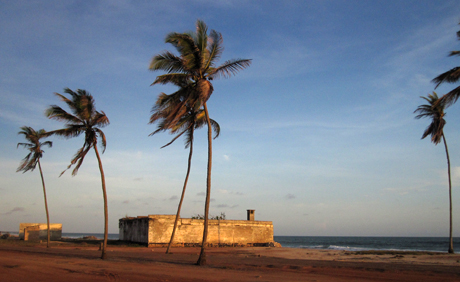
- Old trading fort at Ada Foah

- Location in Ghana
- Coordinates: 5°47′N 0°38′E
- Country: Ghana
- Region: Greater Accra Region
- District: Ada East

Ada Foah is a town on the southeast coast of Ghana, where the Volta River meets the Atlantic Ocean. The town is located along the Volta River, off of the Accra-Aflao motorway. Known for palm-lined beaches and estuary islands, Ada Foah is also the capital of the Ada East District (formerly Dangme East District) and the seat of the District Assembly.

== History ==
Danish colonialism into Ada in the 16th century saw development of a trading post in 1775. The name "Foah" comes from the word Fort, as from 1783, Fort Kongenstein was built by the Danish and used in the Transatlantic Slave Trade and Sub-Saharan Slave Trade. The fort was purchased by the English on 15 March 1850.

Only traces of Fort Kongenstein are found in Ada, in the Greater Accra Region. The port of Ada is located at the mouth of the Volta River. Ada people were sold and shipped to the Americas through this fort as slaves. The fort has almost disappeared into the sea and is half eroded, gradually washing the building that once used to be a prison into the ocean. As rising water levels continues to jeopardise the coast and local communities, construction of the sea defence wall hope to stop this progress.

British colonial rule was imposed at the end of the 19th century. Trading with the Europeans in the transatlantic slave trade, Ada became a major market for the slave trade in human exports. After the slave trade had been abolished, the Dangmes traded products of the African tropical forests (mostly palm oil, palm kernels and rubber).

Ada used to be a major trading centre and trade was one of the main sources of income. There were large warehouses for storing the trading goods close to the seaside. Its location at the estuary ensured a quick transportation along the Volta River up to the north of the country.

== Ada today ==
Today, Ada is a shadow of its former self as far as social life and economic activities are concerned. There are hardly any traces of physical structures such as forts, factories and shops remaining, since large parts of the town have been eroded and washed into the sea. Especially with the start of the cocoa industry, Ada lost its importance, since cocoa was transported on the road instead of the river and was harvested far away from the Volta River. Also, the construction of the hydroelectric dam, in Akosombo, completed in 1965, dried up the Volta River and ships could no longer pass. Nene Abram Kabu Akuaku III is the current Paramount Chief of the Ada Traditional Area.

== Tourism ==
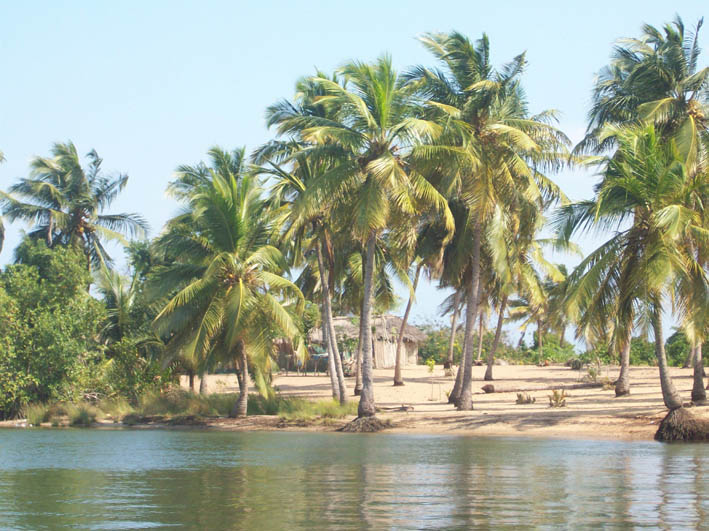
Beach in Ada Foah

Ada Foah is the tourism centre of the Ada East District with its beaches, the estuary and many tourism attractions and services. With the river and the ocean, Ada Foah is famous for water sports like swimming, sailing, fishing, and boat cruises. The river shore is mostly blocked by holiday chalets as many people from Accra use the place as a weekend getaway. There is a ferry and boat harbor at the riverside where boats can be rented for a cruise around the islands in the river. The Ghana Sailing Club, located at the Volta River, is open to members only.

Ada Turtle Bay, developed by Trasacco Estates Development Company, a real estate developer based in Ghana, is a private residence project including 40 private villas and a Hilton Resort and Spa.

== Sights ==
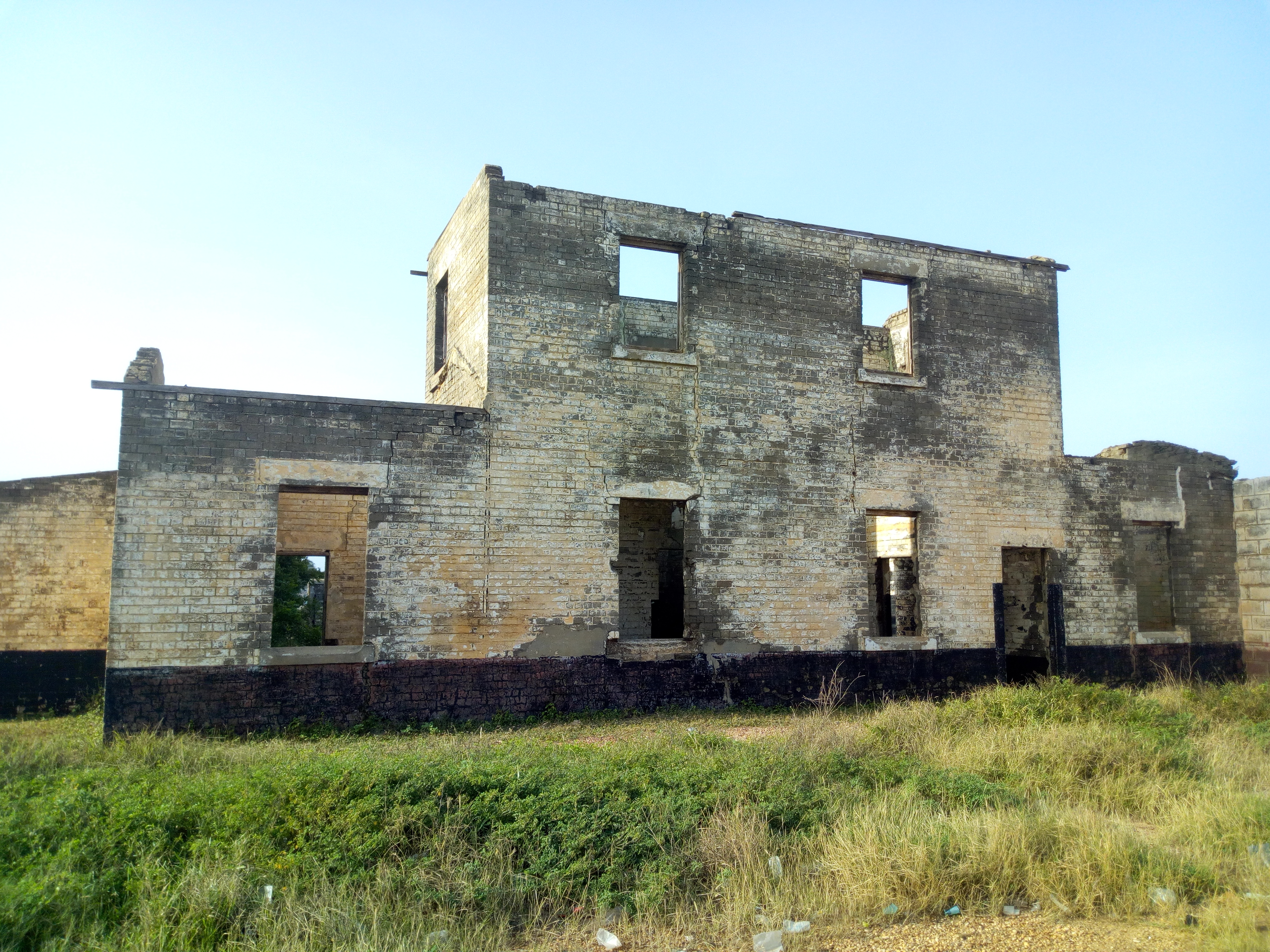
Remains of Fort Kongenstein

Although the old trading fort, built by Danish traders in the 18th century, is already halfway eroded and washed into the ocean, the remains can still be visited. Close to the fort is the Presbyterian Church that was built by the first generation of Ghanaian Christians. Next to it is the old missionary cemetery.

Ghanaian artist Kwame Akoto-Bamfo's installation, Nkyinkyim, which consists of more than 1,300 cement effigies, is embedded in a field in Nuhalenya Ada, a town outside Accra. This collection of cement effigies represents those people involved in the slave trade, opening a dialogue about African history, of which Ada Foah played its role as a trading fort.

== Events ==
Ada Foah is the secondary venue of the annual Asafotufiami Festival that takes place during the first week of August. Its main venue is Big Ada but many celebrations also take place in Ada Foah.

There is a beach soccer tournament on the first weekend of each month at the seaside near the estuary, where teams from different communities in the district compete against each other. Before the start of the tournament, the beach is cleaned, which is the underlying intention of the whole event. Once a month, there is a symposium on the ferry that operates between Ada Foah and Anyanui. This is to inform both locals and tourists about specific topics concerning health, tradition and education.

A boat race takes place every year in December. Paddle boats for 5 or 15 people compete against each other. Visitors can watch the race and also participate if they register as a group about a week in advance.

== Geography ==
=== Climate ===
Tropical savanna climates have monthly mean temperature above 18 °C (64 °F) in every month of the year and typically a pronounced dry season, with the driest month having precipitation less than 60 mm (2.36 in) of precipitation. The Köppen climate classification subtype for this climate is Aw, tropical savanna climate.

Climate data for Ada Foah
Month	Jan	Feb	Mar	Apr	May	Jun	Jul	Aug	Sep	Oct	Nov	Dec	Year
Record high °C (°F)	36.0 (96.8)	35.8 (96.4)	36.7 (98.1)	35.0 (95.0)	35.0 (95.0)	33.9 (93.0)	32.8 (91.0)	31.7 (89.1)	32.8 (91.0)	34.4 (93.9)	35.0 (95.0)	35.6 (96.1)	36.7 (98.1)
Mean daily maximum °C (°F)	30.6 (87.1)	31.1 (88.0)	31.6 (88.9)	31.6 (88.9)	30.9 (87.6)	28.9 (84.0)	27.5 (81.5)	26.9 (80.4)	28.1 (82.6)	29.7 (85.5)	31.1 (88.0)	31.3 (88.3)	29.9 (85.8)
Daily mean °C (°F)	27.6 (81.7)	28.3 (82.9)	28.6 (83.5)	28.4 (83.1)	27.7 (81.9)	26.4 (79.5)	25.2 (77.4)	24.4 (75.9)	25.6 (78.1)	26.9 (80.4)	28.1 (82.6)	28.0 (82.4)	27.1 (80.8)
Mean daily minimum °C (°F)	24.7 (76.5)	25.5 (77.9)	25.7 (78.3)	25.2 (77.4)	24.5 (76.1)	23.9 (75.0)	23.0 (73.4)	22.0 (71.6)	23.1 (73.6)	24.1 (75.4)	25.1 (77.2)	24.7 (76.5)	24.3 (75.7)
Record low °C (°F)	17.0 (62.6)	19.5 (67.1)	20.5 (68.9)	20.0 (68.0)	20.5 (68.9)	19.5 (67.1)	19.0 (66.2)	19.5 (67.1)	20.5 (68.9)	20.5 (68.9)	20.5 (68.9)	17.9 (64.2)	17.0 (62.6)
Average precipitation mm (inches)	4.2 (0.17)	29.6 (1.17)	55.3 (2.18)	107.9 (4.25)	154.6 (6.09)	212.1 (8.35)	61.4 (2.42)	16.3 (0.64)	48.3 (1.90)	76.0 (2.99)	26.2 (1.03)	10.1 (0.40)	802.0 (31.57)
Average precipitation days (≥ 1.0 mm)	0.4	1.5	3.3	5.9	9.4	10.9	4.4	2.6	5.1	5.9	2.7	0.9	53.0
Average relative humidity (%) (at 15:00)	76	76	76	76	78	83	83	83	81	79	77	74	79
Mean monthly sunshine hours	159.2	170.2	222.0	219.5	204.4	145.0	157.4	159.4	199.8	234.4	214.8	204.9	2,291
Mean daily sunshine hours	6.8	7.0	6.9	6.8	6.6	4.3	5.8	6.7	6.4	7.7	8.6	8.2	6.8
Source 1: NOAA (records low, precipitation, sun 1991-2020)
Source 2: Deutscher Wetterdienst

== Gallery ==
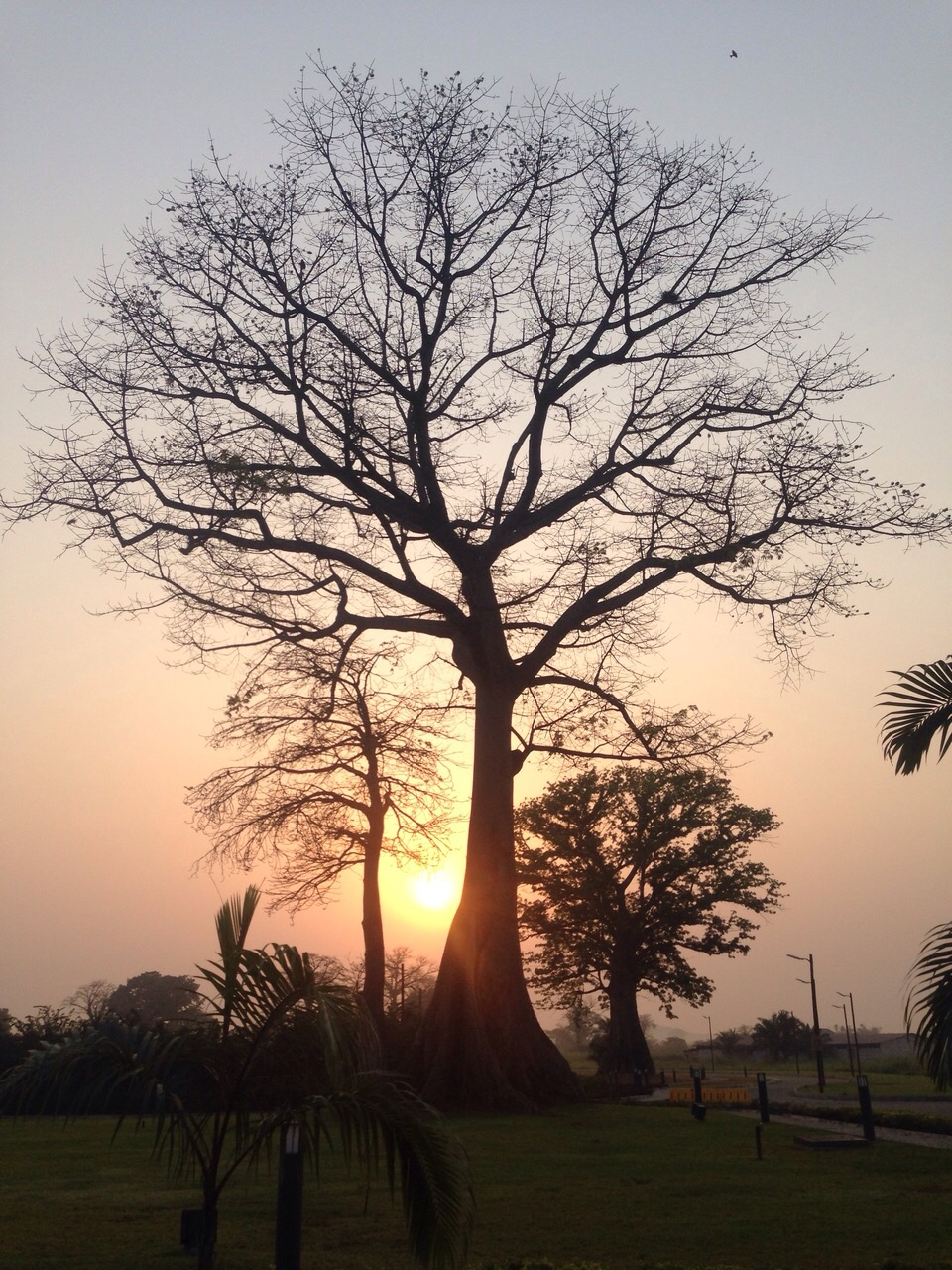
A Tree in Ada

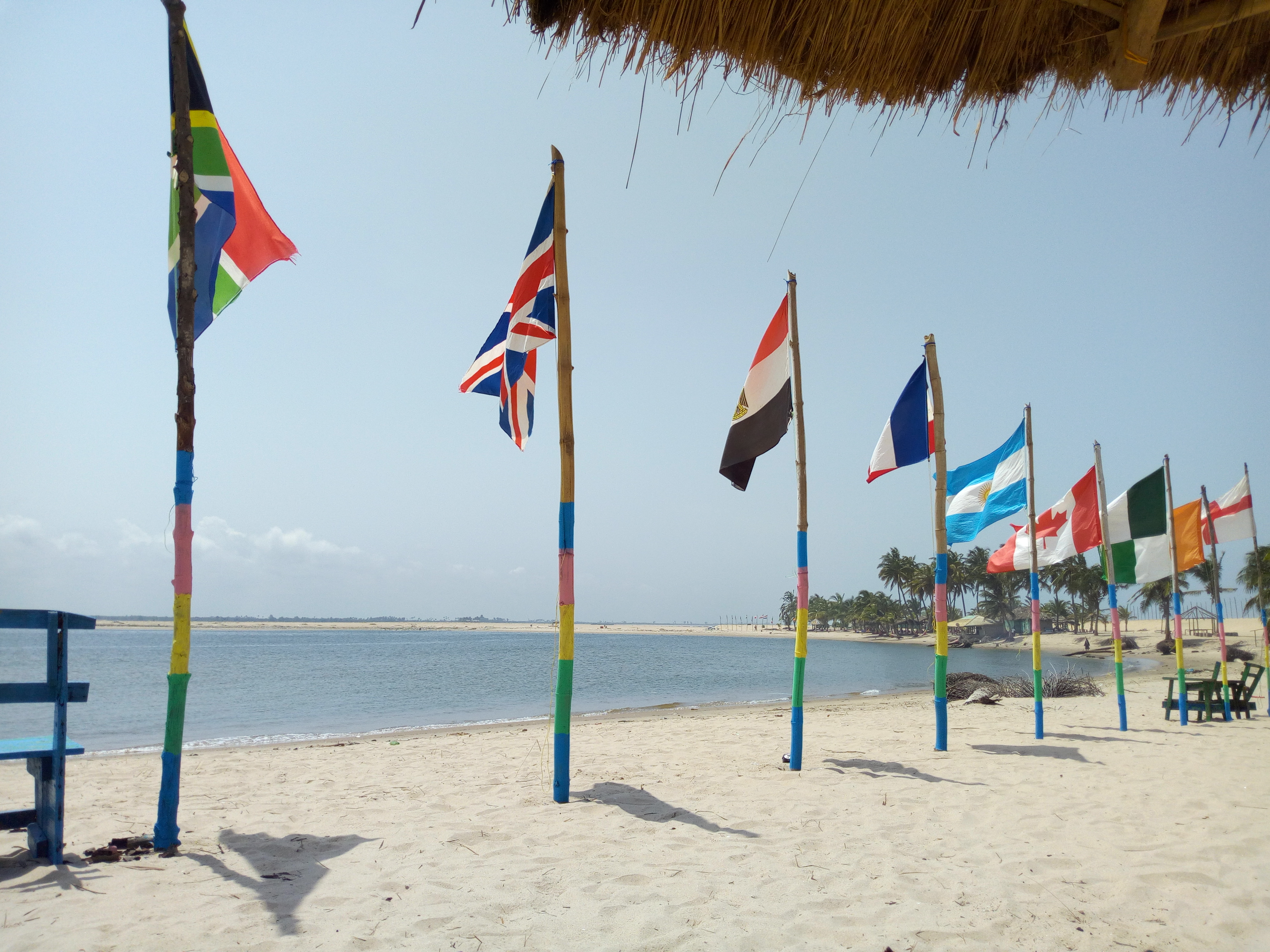
Golden sand at Maranatha Beach Resort

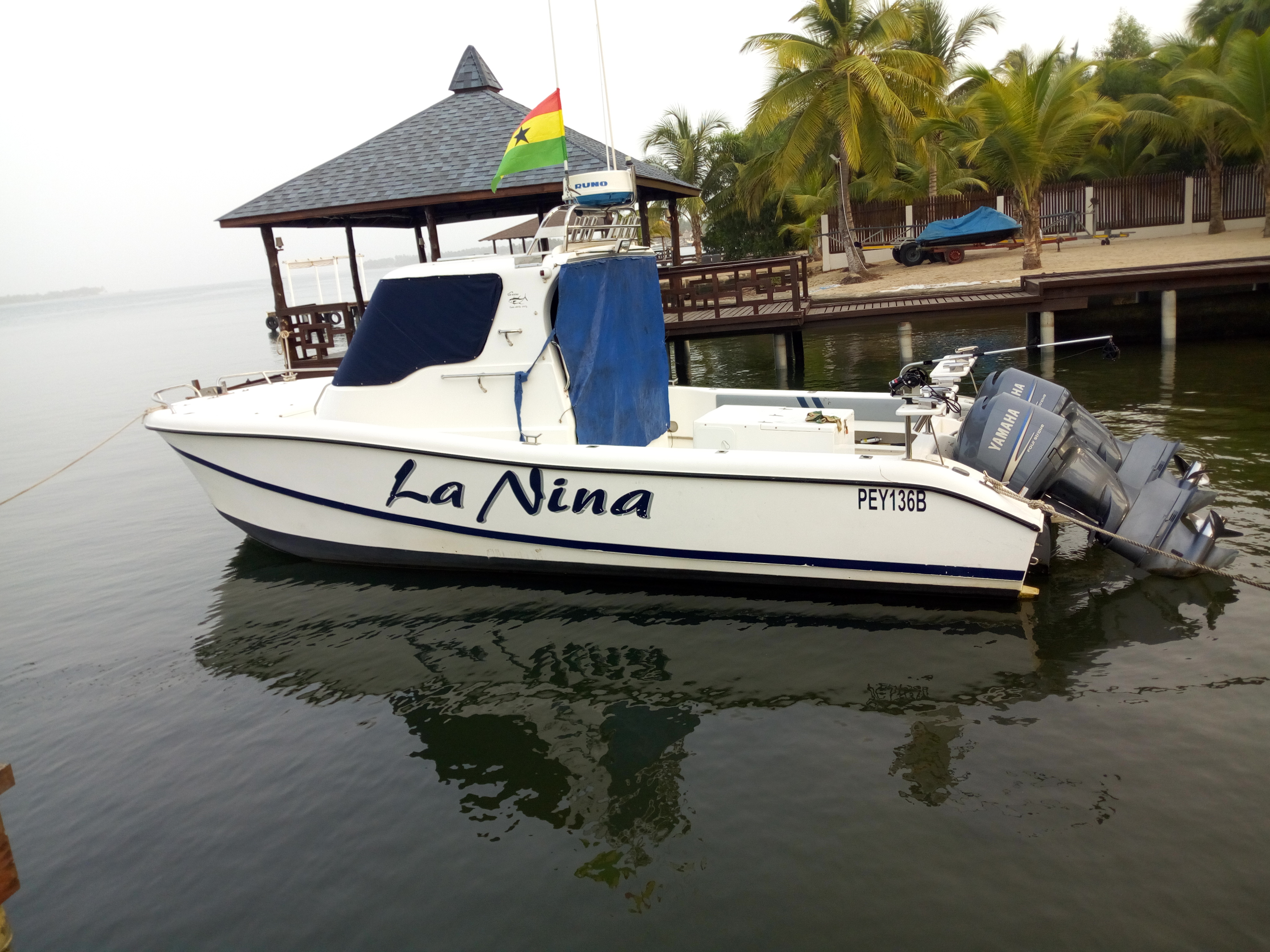
Cruise boat at Ada Foah

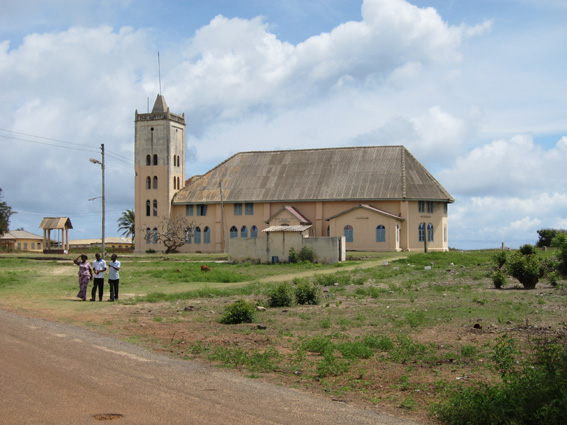
Presbyterian Church in Ada Foah

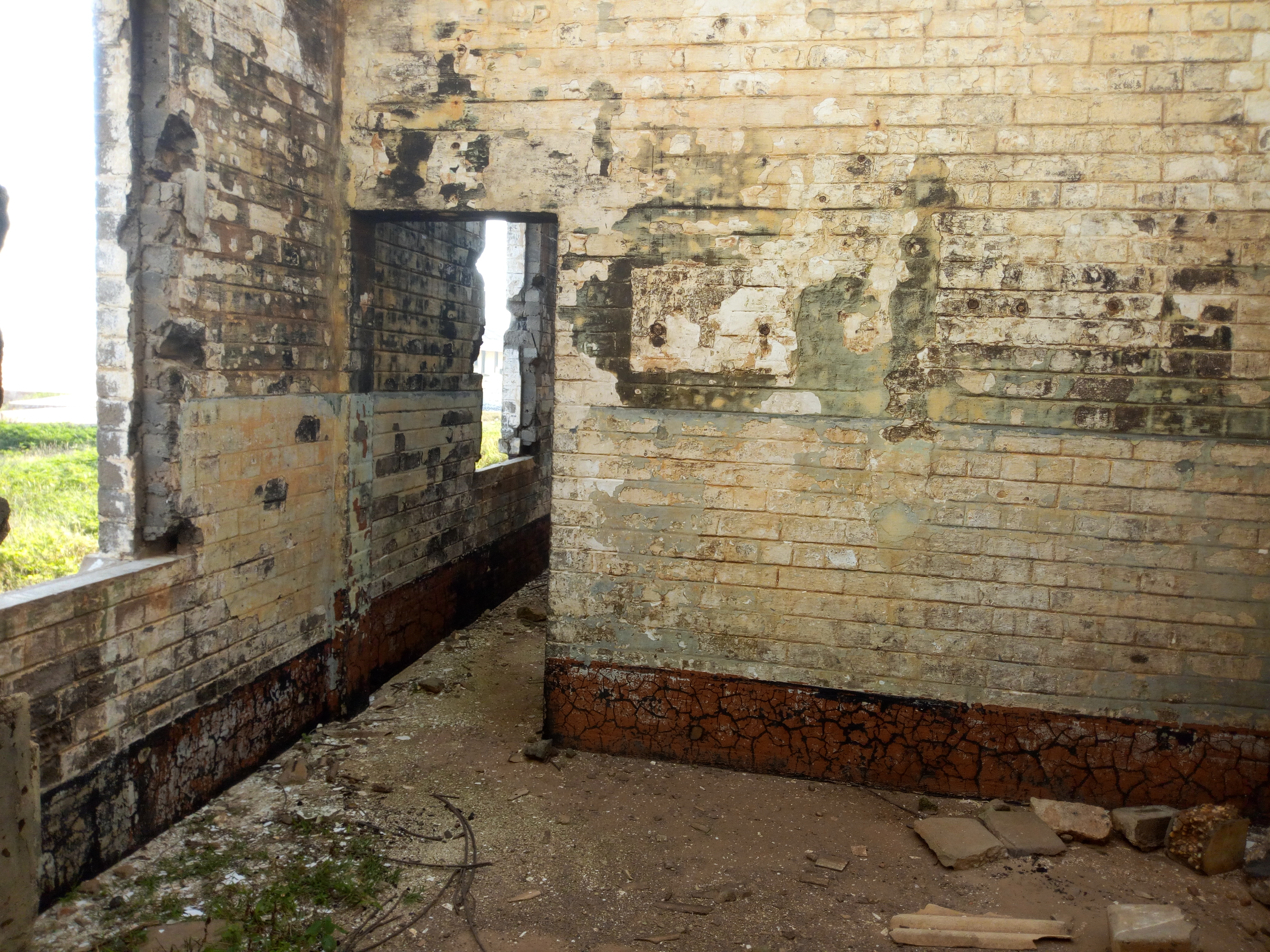
Remains of Fort Kongenstein (2)

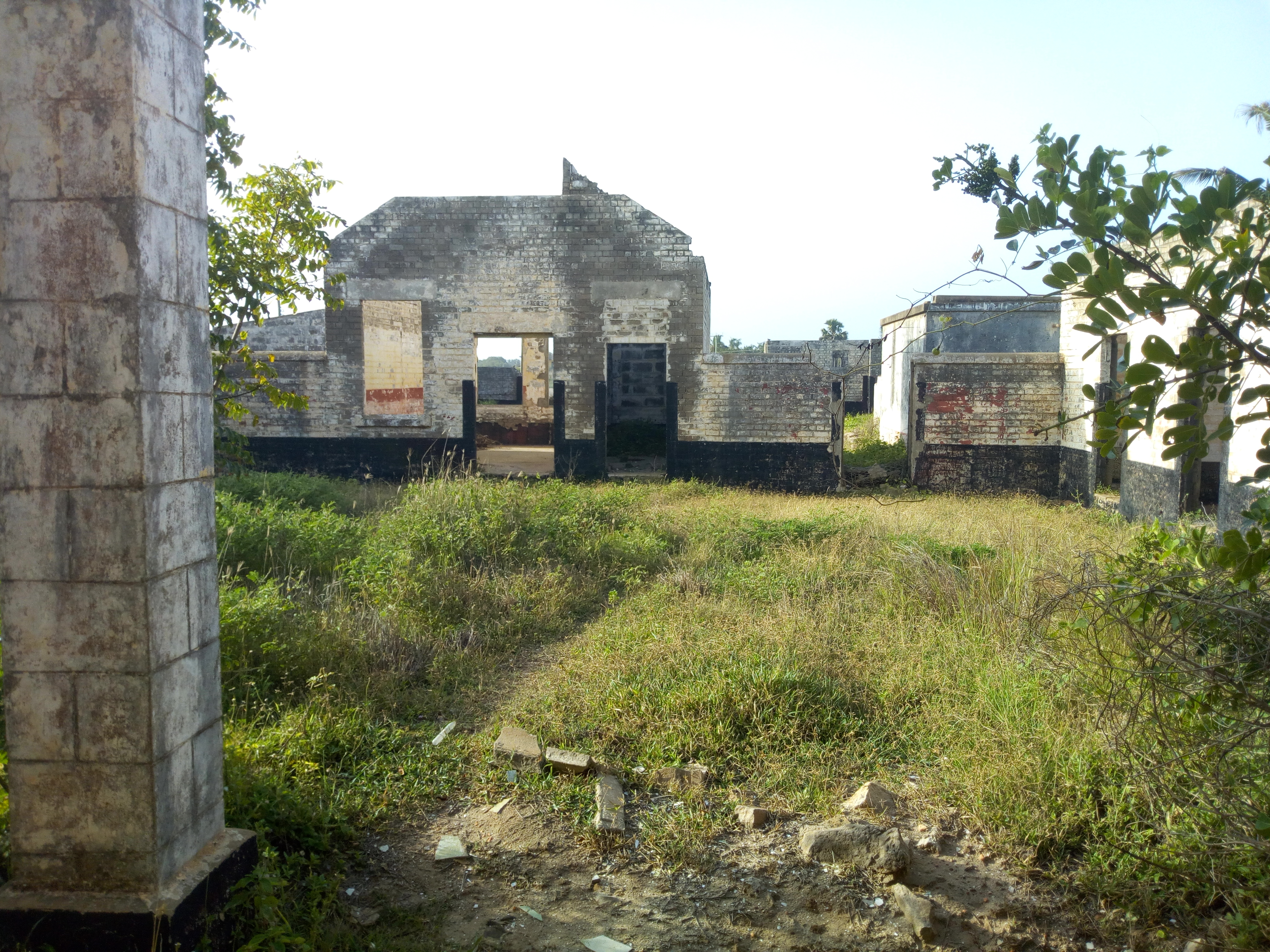
Remains of Fort Kongenstein (3)

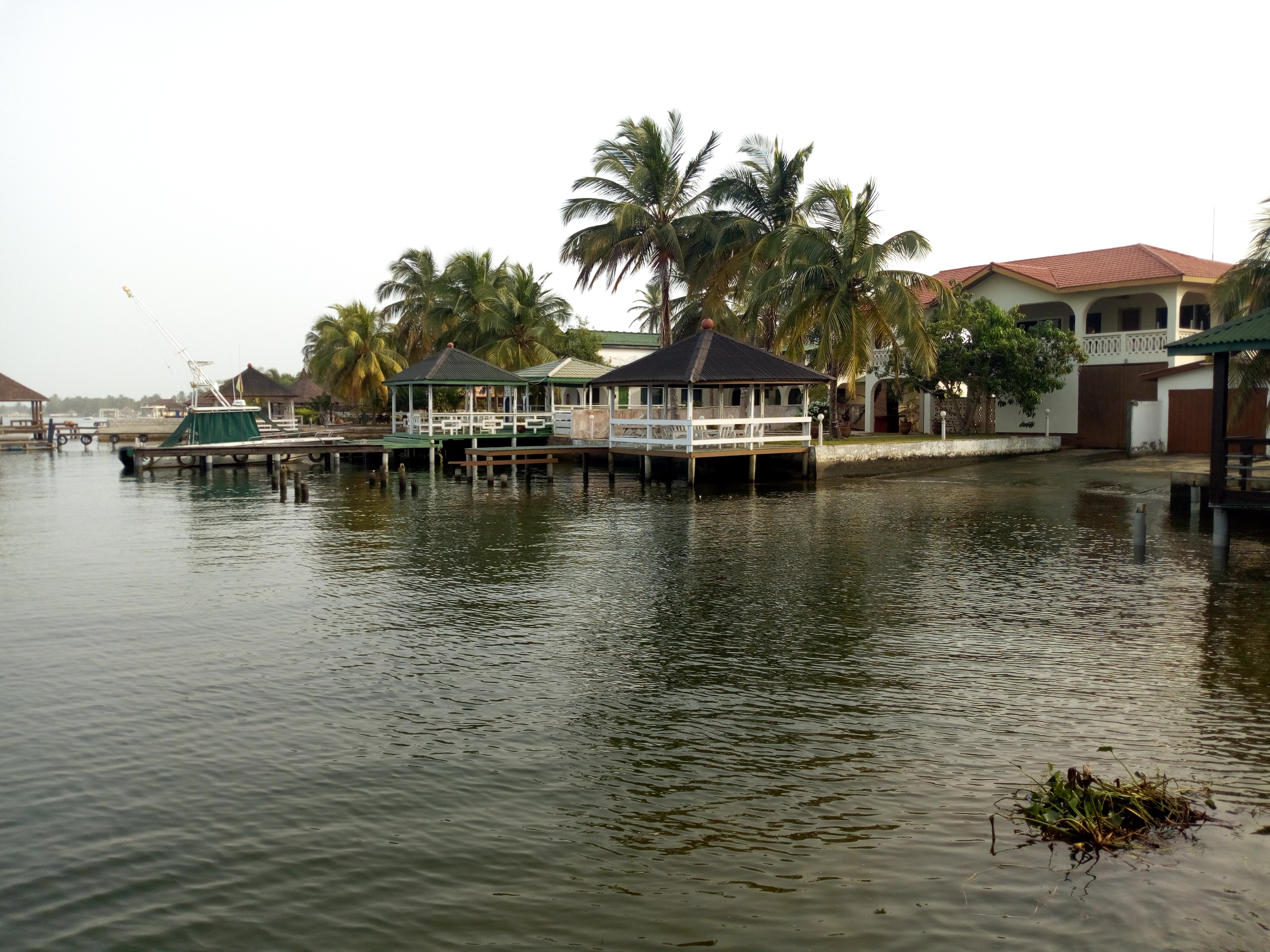
Some chalets along River Volta

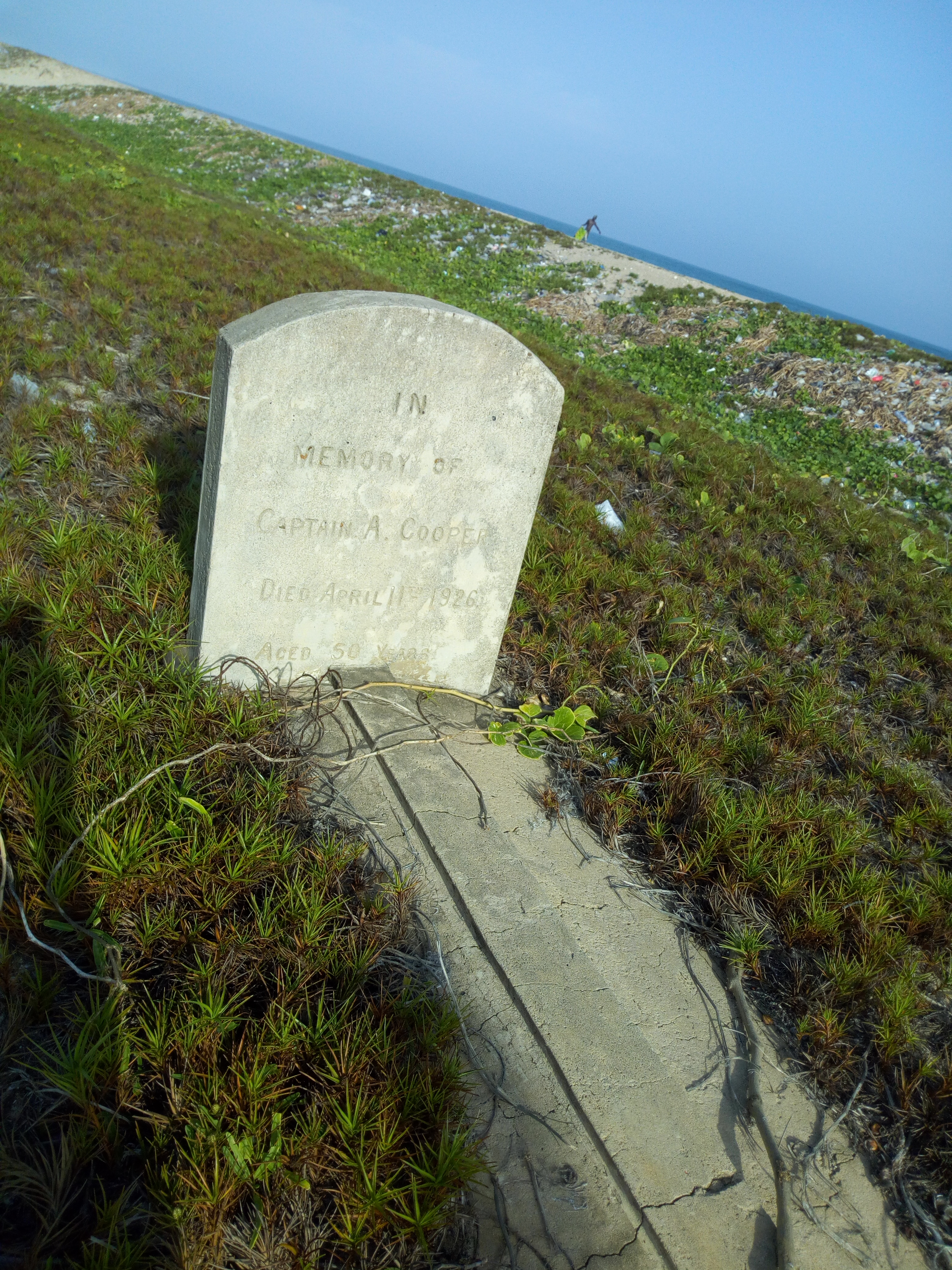
Grave of Captain A. Cooper (1876 - 1926) who died on 11 April 1926, aged 50

== See also ==
- Ada Foah Wave Farm
