= Samuel Nuamah Donkor =

Ghanaian politician and social worker (1958–2022)

Hon. Samuel Nuamah Donkor
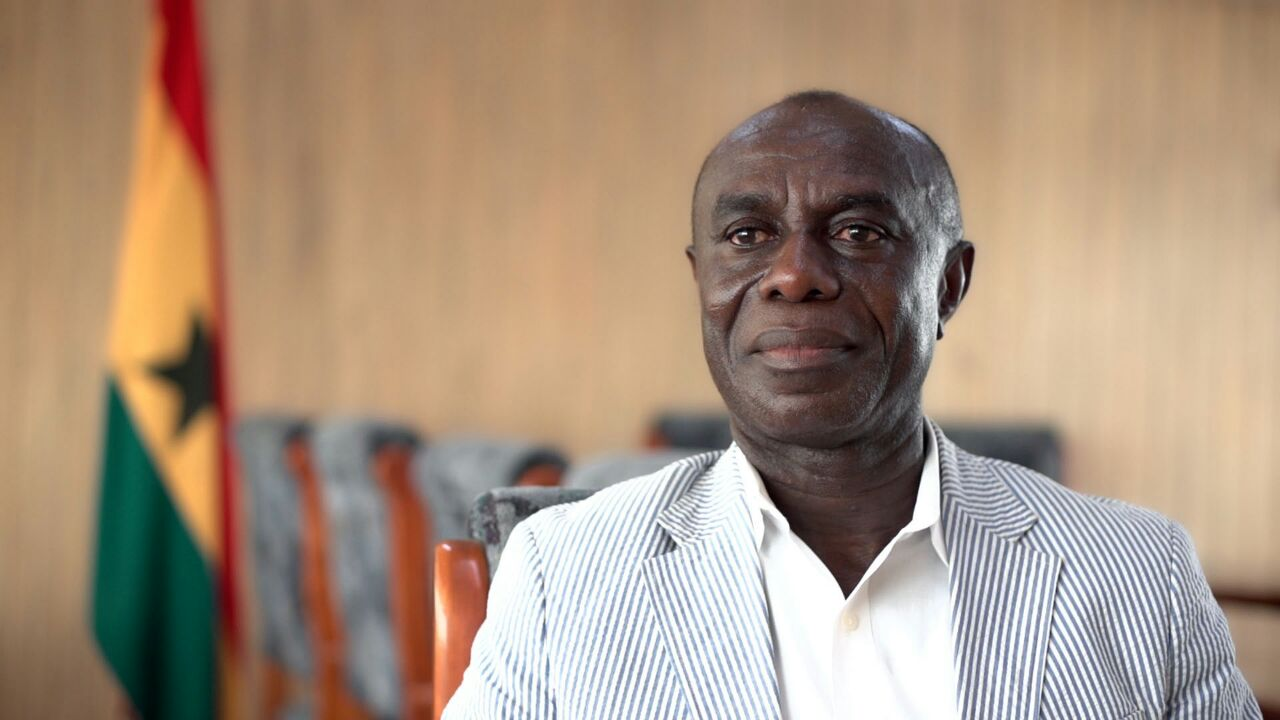

Managing Director Intercity STC
- In office 2014–2017
- President: John Dramani Mahama
- Succeeded by: Nana Akomea

Ashanti Regional Minister
- In office 1999–2001
- President: Jerry John Rawlings
- Succeeded by: Sampson Kwaku Boafo

Minister for Health
- In office 1998–1999
- President: Jerry John Rawlings

Deputy Minister for Health
- In office 1996–1998
- President: Jerry John Rawlings
- Succeeded by: Kwaku Danso-Boafo

Member of Parliament for New Juaben North constituency
- In office 1993–1997
- President: Jerry John Rawlings
- Succeeded by: Hackman Owusu-Agyeman

Personal details
- Born: 5 September 1958 Asokore- Koforidua
- Died: 14 August 2022 (aged 63) Ghana
- Party: National Democratic Congress
- Children: Survived by five children. Raphael Nuamah, Abena Nuamah Yeboah, Princess Terry Nuamah, Samuel Einstein Nuamah Donkor, Oti Boateng Nuamah
- Education: Escuela National De Cuadros

Samuel Nuamah Donkor (5 September 1958 – 14 August 2022) was a Ghanaian politician and social worker. He was a Minister for Health, Minister for Ashanti Region and a member of the first parliament of the fourth republic of Ghana representing New Juaben North constituency under the membership of the National Convention Party (NCP).

In 1982, he was appointed by chairman Jerry John Rawlings of the Provisional National Defence Council (PNDC) as the Deputy regional coordinator for Peoples Defence Committees and Workers Defence Committees (PDCs / WDCs) and additional position as coordinator for New Juaben 1982 to 1992.

Under Jerry John Rawlings administration in 1996 he was appointed Deputy Minister of Health of Ghana before becoming the substantive Minister of Health in 1998.

In 1999, he was appointed the Ashanti Regional Minister position which he held until January 2001, when the National Democratic Congress handed over government to the opposition party, the New Patriotic Party.

In March 2014, he was appointed the managing director of the Intercity State Transport Company limited (STC) in the National Democratic Congress, under John Mahama administration from 2014 to 2017.

== Early life and education ==
Samuel Nuamah Donkor was born on 5 September 1958 to Opanin Kwabena Agyekum, Gyaasehene of Asokore-Koforidua in the Eastern Region of Ghana and Madam Abena Akyaamah also from Asokore- Koforidua.

He schooled in Pope John Senior High School and Minor Seminary for his GCE O level. Having completed his O level studies in 1978, he continued his studies at Koforidua Secondary Technical for his GCE Advanced level certificate in physics, chemistry and biology. He attended Escuela National De Cuadros, Management Development and Productivity Institute where he obtained his Diploma and Certificate in Social Science and Management Studies respectively. He worked as a social worker before going into parliament.

== Career ==
In March 2014 Donkor was appointed the managing director of the state transport company limited.

== Politics ==
He began his political career in 1982, appointed by chairman Jerry John Rawlings of the Provisional National Defence Council PNDC as the Deputy regional coordinator for Peoples Defence Committees and Workers Defence Committees (PDCs / WDCs) and additional position as coordinator for New Juaben North 1982 to 1992, when he became the parliamentary candidate for the National Convention Party (NCP) to represent his constituency in the Eastern Region of Ghana prior to the commencement of the 1992 Ghanaian parliamentary election. Under the Jerry John Rawlings administration, he served as minister for health.

=== Member of parliament ===
He was sworn into the First Parliament of the Fourth Republic of Ghana on 7 January 1993 after being pronounced winner at the 1992 Ghanaian election held on 29 December 1992. After serving his four years tenure in office, Samuel Nuamah Donkor lost his seat in the 1996 Ghanaian General Elections to his counterpart in the New Patriotic Party (NPP), Hackman Owusu Agyemang who polled 11,629 votes which represented 52.60% of the total votes cast. Donkor who represented National Democratic Congress (NDC) polled 7,494 votes representing 33.90% of the total valid votes cast, Michael Adu-Bonsu of the People's National Convention (PNC) polled 264 votes representing 1.20% of the total valid votes cast, John Buabeng of the Convention People's Party (CPP) polled 77 votes representing 0.30% of the total valid votes cast and Samuel Osei-Owusu of the National Convention Party polled 43 votes representing 0.20% of the total votes cast.

In parliament, he was appointed the deputy minority leader of Parliament from 1983 to 1996. He also served on the Parliamentary committees of defence and interior, finance and foreign affairs. In 1995, he was appointed the chairman of the foreign affairs committee of Parliament.

=== Minister of state ===
In 1996, he was appointed Deputy Minister of Health of Ghana in the Jerry John Rawlings administration. He assisted the minister in introducing reforms in the health sector. It was during that period that guinea worm was eradicated from Ghana.

In 1998, as Minister for Health of Ghana, he introduced the popular Addition Duty Hours Allowance (ADHA) for doctors and health professionals. This allowance served as motivation for doctors and health professionals which reduce incidence of "strike actions" from such professionals.

He was awarded a certificate of honour by the Ghana medical Association (GMA) in its annual conference held in Suyani in the Brong Ahafo Region. The nurses used to call him "The darling boy of the Nurses".

In 1999, he was appointed the Ashanti Regional Minister, a position he held till January, 2001.

== Personal life ==
Donkor identified as a Christian.

== Death ==
Samuel Nuamah Donkor died on Sunday 14 August 2022. He left behind a wife, Irene Nuamah Donkor, and five children, Raphael Nuamah, Abena Nuamah Yeboah, Princess Terry Nuamah, Samuel Einstein Nuamah Donkor and Oti Boateng Nuamah.
