= Nana Amba Eyiaba I =

Ghanaian queen mother (born 1950)

- Born: Eunice Amba Amoah; February 18, 1950 (age 76); Cape Coast, Gold Coast
- Education: Bachelor of Education, University of Cape Coast, 1997; Diploma in Advanced study of Education, University of Cape Coast, 1980
- Occupations: Educator, advocate
- Title: Queen Mother of Effutu 16
- Board member of: Ghana Museums and Monuments Board, Panafest, OLA College of Education, Graphic Communications Group Limited, the Central Region Tourism Development Committee, the Environmental Protection Agency, and the Central Regional Peace Council Board.

Nana Amba Eyiaba I, known non-formally as Eunice Amba Amoah (born February 18, 1950), is a Ghanaian queen mother from the Effutu Municipal District of Central Region, Ghana. She is the former Director of Education for Central Region. From 2004 to 2010, Eyiaba was appointed by President John Kufuor to serve as a member of the national Electoral Commission of Ghana, co-organizing and supervising the parliamentary and presidential elections of 2004 and 2008.

As an advocate for the increased recognition and political participation of queen mothers in Ghanaian society, Eyiaba was instrumental in establishing the national Council of Women Traditional Leaders (CWTL) in 2001. She served as an executive member for CWTL until 2016.

Eyiaba has served on the board of directors for the Ghana Museums and Monuments Board, Panafest, the Central Region Tourism Development Committee, the Environmental Protection Agency, the OLA College of Education, the Graphic Communications Group Limited, and the Mental Health Authority Board. In 2017, she was Vice-Chairperson for the Central Regional Peace Council Board.

== Early life and education ==
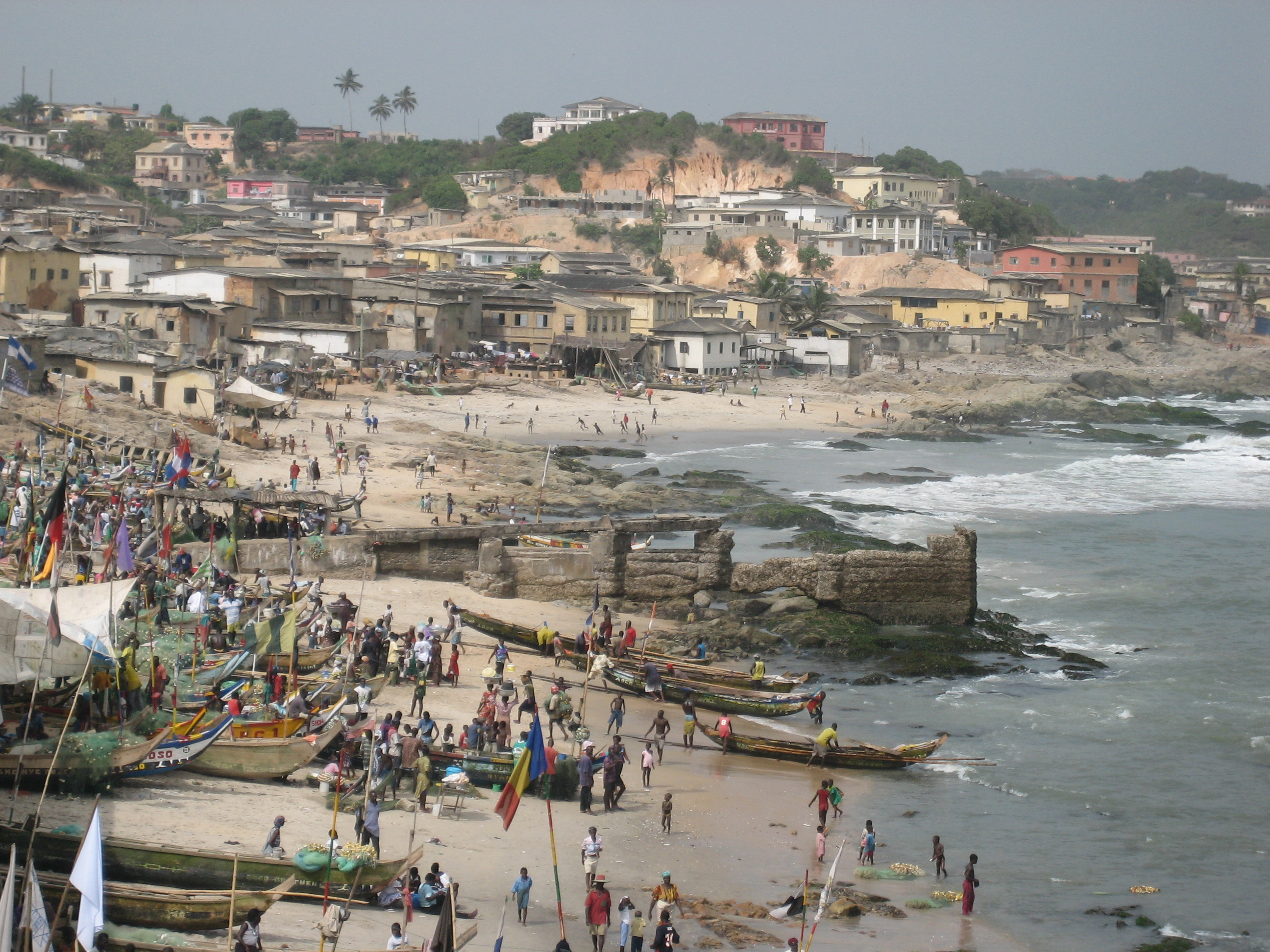
A view of Cape Coast, Ghana (c. 2002)

Eunice Amba Amoah was born on February 18, 1950, in Cape Coast, Ghana.

In 1971, after finishing her basic schooling and working as an untrained teacher for several years, Amoah completed her Teachers’ Certificate ‘A’ from the Teachers’ Training College in Accra. In 1977, she took an Education Specialist course at the Advanced Teacher Training College at the University of Education, Winneba. In 1980, Amoah received her Diploma in Advanced study of Education from the University of Cape Coast (UCC), and from 1994 to 1997, Amoah studied in the Bachelor of Education program at UCC, completing her degree with a major in Educational Psychology.

== Appointment as queen mother ==
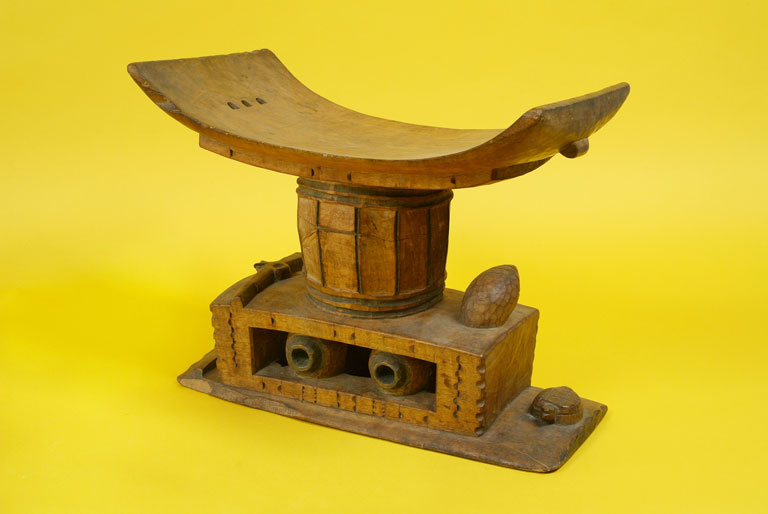
A Ghanaian queen mother's stool, used in the ceremonial appointment of new queen mothers

Every town or village in Ghana traditionally selects a woman as queen mother from the local "royal family" – the original family who first settled in the area. Queen mothers partner with male chiefs to provide leadership, and are responsible for maintaining local cultural traditions and providing care for women and children in the area. The title "Nana" is a term of respect that signifies status, and queen mothers are given the role for life. As of 2016, there were approximately 10,000 queen mothers across Ghana.

In 1982, Eunice Amba Amoah was officially appointed – or "enstooled" – as Nana Amba Eyiaba I, the queen mother of Effutu 16 of the Effutu Municipal District.

== Council of Traditional Women Leaders ==
=== Historical background ===
Although there have been queen mothers in Ghana for hundreds of years, their political influence was diminished when European colonialists arrived and insisted on dealing solely with male chiefs. In 1957, when Ghana declared independence, queen mothers were excluded from regional institutions, and male chiefs were given sole recognition as regional leaders. By 1992, the constitution of the Republic of Ghana had formally recognized queen mothers under the definition of chiefs, but both the Regional House and National House of Chiefs did not allow queen mothers to be admitted as regular members.

=== Development of national council ===
In 2001, after a national conference on leadership and representation was held by the University of Ghana, a group of queen mothers developed the national Council of Women Traditional Leaders (CWTL). Although queen mothers were the initial members of CWTL, membership eventually grew to include other women traditional leaders of Ghana, including women from Asafo warrior companies.

Nana Amba Eyiaba I played a key role in the development of CWTL, and served as an executive member for the council until 2016. She has advocated for new and better political forums for queen mothers, proposing the creation of a National House of Queenmothers.

After a decision by the national Minister of Chieftaincy in 2013, queen mothers could attend meetings of the regional and national Houses of Chiefs, but held no voting rights. In 2016, CWTL was in the process of fighting for full representation.

== Ministry of education, board work, and electoral commission ==
After completing her Bachelor of Education degree from UCC in 1997, Eyiaba worked as a school inspector for the Regional Education Directorate, later becoming the Acting Regional Chief Inspector of Schools for the Central Region of Ghana. She was eventually promoted to Director of Education for the Central Region, before retiring from the Ghana Education Service of the Ministry of Education at the age of 59.

Eyiaba has served on the board of directors for the Ghana Museums and Monuments Board, Panafest, the Central Region Tourism Development Committee, the Environmental Protection Agency, the OLA College of Education, the Graphic Communications Group Limited, and the Mental Health Authority Board. In 2017, she was Vice-Chairperson for the Central Regional Peace Council Board.

In 2004, Eyiaba was appointed a member of the Electoral Commission of Ghana by President John Kufuor. She co-organized and supervised the Ghanaian parliamentary and presidential elections of 2004 and 2008. In 2008, as the Commissioner for the Brong-Ahafo Regional office of the Electoral Commission, Eyiaba assisted in the resolution of a dispute over the Asutifi South parliamentary election results. She retired from the Electoral Commission in 2010.
