= Ishmael Ashitey =

Ghanaian politician (1954–2022)

Hon. Ishmael Ashitey

Greater Accra Regional Minister
- In office February 2017 – March 2021
- President: Nana Akufo-Addo
- Preceded by: Joshua Nii Laryea Afotey-Agbo
- Succeeded by: Henry Quartey

Member of the Ghana Parliament for Tema East
- In office 7 January 1997 – 6 January 2009
- Preceded by: Erasmus Aruna Quao
- Succeeded by: Samuel Evans Ashong Narh
- Parliamentary group: National Patriotic Party

Personal details
- Born: 20 November 1954 Gold Coast (now Ghana)
- Died: 7 January 2022 (aged 67) Ghana
- Party: New Patriotic Party
- Children: Sheba Ashitey, Janet Ashitey, Nelda Ashitey, Emmanuel Ashitey
- Education: Ghana Institute of Management and Public Administration
- Profession: Mechanical Engineer

Ishmael Ashitey (20 November 1954 – 7 January 2022) was a Ghanaian politician who was a Member of Parliament for the New Patriotic Party. He was the Greater Accra Regional Minister of Ghana. He was appointed by President Nana Addo Dankwa Akuffo-Addo in January 2017, and was approved by the Parliament of Ghana in February 2017.

== Early life and education ==
Ashitey was born on 20 November 1954. He had his basic school at the Manhean Middle Mixed School in Tema. He further went to the Kpando Technical Institute in the Volta region and later to the Accra Polytechnic where he studied Mechanical engineering. He had his diploma in mechanical engineering at KNUST. He attended the Ghana Institute of Management and Public Administration. From the institute, he obtained an Executive Masters in Governance and Leadership.

== Career ==
Prior to his career in politics, Ashitey was a mechanical engineer. He worked in many companies in and outside Ghana such as Accra Brewery Limited, Tema Steel Works, Tecnofin Nederlands and General Establishment for Plastics & Industries in Libya.

== Politics ==
Ashitey had served as the member of parliament for the Tema East constituency in the 2nd, 3rd and 4th parliaments of the 4th republic of Ghana. This spanned over the period from 7 January 1997 to 6 January 2009.

=== 1996 Elections ===
Ashitey emerged winner of the 1996 Ghanaian General Elections. As a member of parliament of the second parliament of the fourth republic of Ghana, he was sworn into office on 7 January 1997. He won with 33,421 votes representing 35.80% of the total valid votes hence defeating his opponents; Nii Adjei Larbie of the National Democratic Congress who polled 29,914 votes representing 32.00% of the total valid votes cast, Seth Laryea Tetteh of the Convention People's Part polled 4,211 votes which represent 4.50% and Frank Sontim-Bour Yendork of the People's National Convention polled 1,803 votes which represent 1.90% of the total votes cast .

=== 2000 Elections ===
Ashitey was elected as the member of parliament for the Tema East constituency in the 3rd parliament of the 4th republic in the 2000 Ghanaian general elections. He was elected on the ticket of the New Patriotic Party. His constituency was a part of the six out of 22 parliamentary seats won by the New Patriotic Party in that election for the Greater Accra Region. The National Democratic Congress won a minority total of 92 parliamentary seats out of 200 seats in the 3rd parliament of the 4th republic of Ghana. He was elected with 35,044 votes out of 63,034 total valid votes cast. This was equivalent to 56.2% of the total valid votes cast. He was elected over Eben T. Anuwa-Armah of the National Democratic Congress, Dr. Frederick W. Asante Akuffo of the Convention People's Party, William Kobb-Lumor of the National Reform party, Erasmus Aruna Quao of the People's National Convention and Mensah Steve of the United Ghana Movement. These obtained 18,432, 5,028, 2,262, 1,198 and 402 votes respectively out of the total valid votes cast. These were equivalent to 29.6%, 8.1%, 3.6%, 1.9 and 0.6% respectively of total valid votes cast.

=== 2004 Elections ===
Ashitey was elected as the member of Parliament in the 4th parliament of the 4th republic of Ghana in the 2004 Ghanaian general elections. He was elected with 41,519 votes out of the 86,284 total values cast. This was equivalent to 48.1% of the total valid votes cast. He was elected over Emelia Kai Adjei of the National Democratic Congress, Charles Akwetey Fynn-Williams of the Convention People's Party; and Albert Anawi Nuamah, Lord Koranteng Hamah and Ramseyer Agyeman Prempeh all independent candidates. These obtained 31.6%,1.7%, 6.4%, 2.0% and 10.3% respectively of the total valid votes cast. Ashitey was elected on the ticket of the New Patriotic Party. His constituency was a part of the 17 constituencies won by the New Patriotic Party in the Greater Accra region in that election. In all, the New Patriotic Party won a total 128 parliamentary seats in the 4th parliament of the 4th republic of Ghana.

== Personal life ==
Ashitey was a Christian and was a Presbyterian and enjoyed reading, swimming, walking and listening to music. He had a wife with four children.

== Death ==
He died on 7 January 2022 at the International Maritime Hospital in Tema, at the age of 67. Other source also claimed he passed on at the Tema General Hospital at 68.
