= Pope John Senior High School and Minor Seminary =

Boys boarding school in Koforidua, Ghana

- Pojoss Insignia

Location
- P. O. Box 370; Koforidua, Ghana; Eastern Region; Koforidua, Ghana, Eastern Region, 23321; Ghana

Information
- School type: Boys Boarding/ Residential; Government funded
- Motto: Vela Damus (We Set Sail)
- Religious affiliation: Christianity
- Denomination: Roman Catholic
- Patron saints: Sacred Heart of Jesus and St. John
- Established: 21 January 1958; 68 years ago
- Founder: Bishop Joseph Oliver Bowers SVD
- School board: Board of Governors
- School district: New Juabeng North Municipal
- GES Category: A
- Oversight: Ghana Education Service
- Rector: Rev. Fr. Marcellus Gorleku
- Headmaster: Rev. Fr. Benjamin Ohene
- Chaplain: Rev. Fr. Joel Kwame
- Staff: 93 teachers
- Grades: Forms' (1–3)
- Gender: Boys
- Age range: 14–18
- Campus: Effiduase
- Houses: 7
- Colours: Yellow and blue-black
- Slogan: Pojoba Daasebre!!
- Song: O Great Pojomma Arise and Shine!
- Fight song: Sacred Heart of Jesus
- Athletics: Track and Field
- Mascot: Boat
- Nickname: POJOSS
- Rival: St. Peter's Senior High School
- Publication: POJOMAG
- Newspaper: The Gong
- Affiliation: Roman Catholic Church, Ghana
- Alumni: Pope John Old Boys Association(POJOBA)
- Website: popejohnshs.edu.gh

Pope John Senior High School and Minor Seminary (POJOSS), formerly St. John's Seminary and College, is a Catholic all-boys day-boarding school located in Effiduase, Koforidua, in the Eastern Region of Ghana. Established in 1958 by Bishop Joseph Oliver Bowers of the Society of the Divine Word (SVD), the school was originally founded as a seminary for boys aspiring to become priests, primarily for those interested in the Catholic priesthood.

The school offers programs in General arts, General science, Business, and Visual arts. Its aim is to prepare students to sit for the West African Senior School Certificate Examination (WASSCE), a prerequisite for admission into tertiary institutions in Ghana. The student body comprises approximately 2,100 boys, who are colloquially referred to as "Pojomma", while alumni are known as "POJOBA", with the response "Daasebre" serving as a cultural identifier among them. Pope John Senior High won the National Science and Maths Quiz for 2001 in Ghana.

== History ==
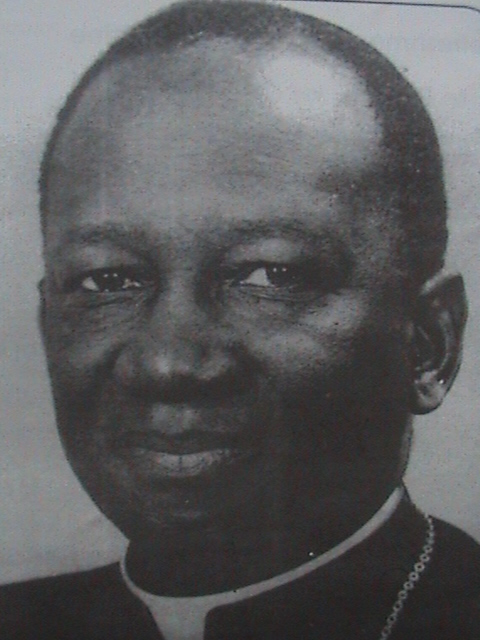
Bishop Joseph Oliver Bowers

On 8 November 1953, Bishop Joseph Oliver Bowers, then Catholic Bishop of the Diocese of Accra, visited the New Juaben Traditional Area in Ghana's Eastern Region on a pastoral mission. During this visit, he held discussions with Nana Frempong Moposo II, the local chief, which led to the acquisition of land at Effiduase, Koforidua, for a Roman Catholic Church mission.

In early 1955, Bishop Bowers initiated plans to establish a junior seminary on the acquired land for the Diocese of Accra. Father Anthony Bauer and Father Henk Janseen surveyed the site, and their reports supported the development. Construction began in January 1955, with Fr. Jude SVD, Dr. Balduricus, and Dr. Lucian Orians overseeing the building of a classroom block, a combined residence, and administrative facility. In early 1957, Dr. Damian Brockmann, SVD, constructed the first science block, later replaced by a dormitory known as Elsbend House, named after the first headmaster.

In October 1957, Bishop Bowers appointed Rev. Fr. Alphonse Elsbend as the first Headmaster and Seminary Rector, supported by Rev. John O'Sullivan, Rev. Joseph Skorupka, and Bismark Sosu. The school's chapel was completed in 1958.

=== Opening ===
On 21 January 1958, St. John's Seminary and College officially opened with an initial enrollment of 45 students, comprising 14 seminarians and 31 day students across two forms. The initital teaching staff comprised included three SVD priests appointed by the bishop and one Ghanaian lay teacher, Mr. Paul Ohene-Boakye, who supported in the students' academic, and religious formation.

In June 1958, electricity was extended to the school at a cost of £45. By this time, the school's enrollment had grown to 113 students, including 23 seminarians and 90 day students.

=== Change of Name and Absorption Into the Public Education System ===
From 1958 to 1968, St. John's College operated as a private Catholic institution funded by the Catholic Diocese of Accra and student fees. However, the high cost of maintaining the school led Father Fredrichs, the second Headmaster, with the approval of Bishop Joseph Oliver Bowers, to apply for the school's incorporation into Ghana's Public Education System under the Ministry of Education.

On 1 September 1968, the school was absorbed into the Ghana Education Service as a government-assisted secondary school. The name was changed to Pope John Secondary School and Junior Seminary to distinguish it from other Catholic schools in Ghana named St. John. The new name honored Pope John XXIII, who had convened the Second Vatican Council, while preserving the identity and mission of the original institution.

Following the 2007 Ghana education reform under the administration of President John Kufuor, the school was renamed Pope John Senior High School and Minor Seminary.

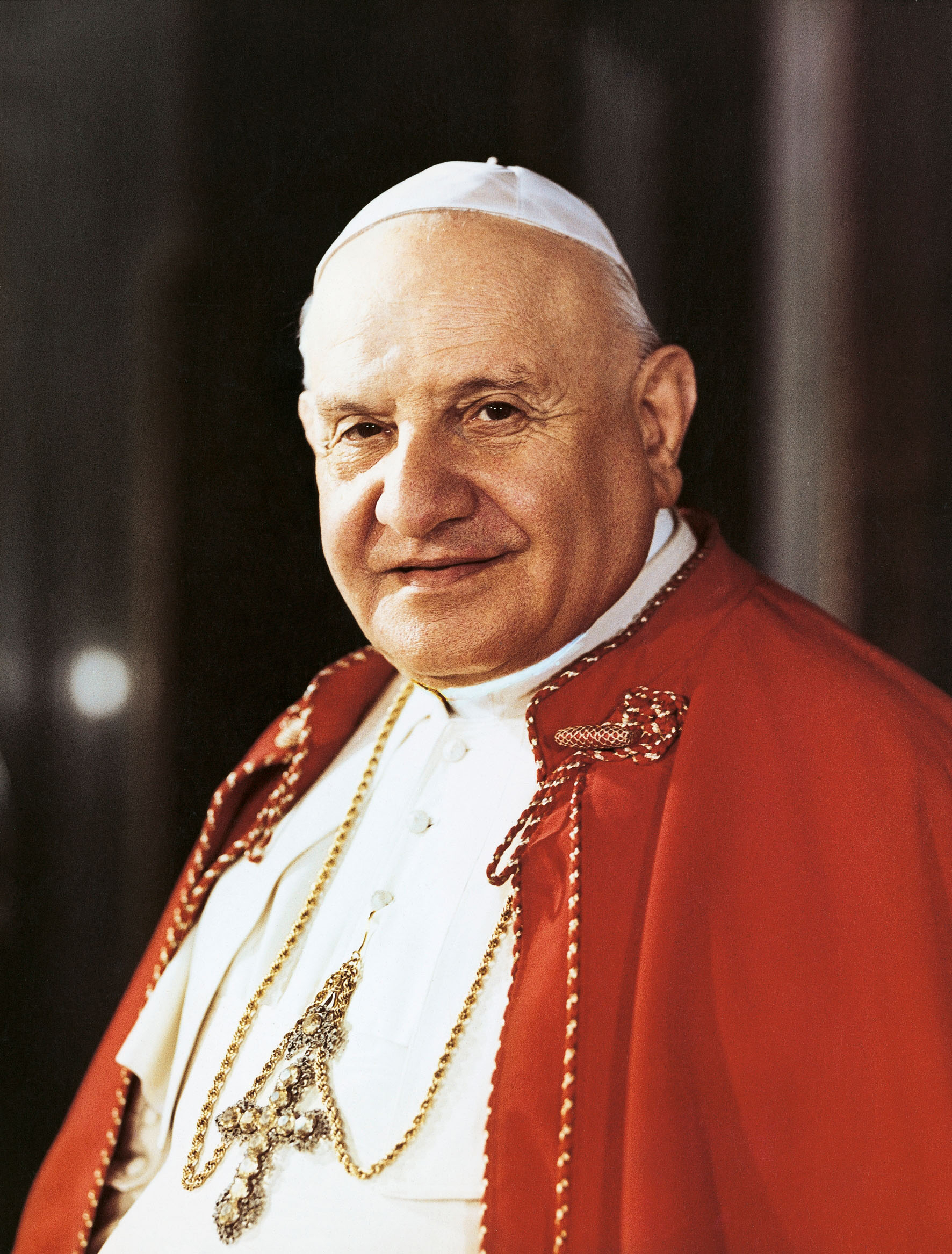
Pope John XXIII

=== Growth and development ===
The foundation laid by the Society of the Divine Word (SVD) Fathers under the supervision of Bishop Joseph Oliver Bowers has contributed to the development of Pope John Senior High School and Minor Seminary. In July 1992, the Roman Catholic Diocese of Koforidua was established, gaining autonomy from the Metropolitan Roman Catholic Archdiocese of Accra. The Most Rev. Dr. Charles G. Palmer-Buckle became the first bishop of the new diocese, which assumed responsibility for managing the school within the Ecclesiastical Province of Accra.

The school has a teaching staff of 92 and a non-teaching staff of 85. It accommodates over 2,000 boarding students, including nearly 100 seminarians. Since its establishment, approximately 8,000 students have graduated, with over 100 alumni ordained as Catholic priests.

== Academic performance ==
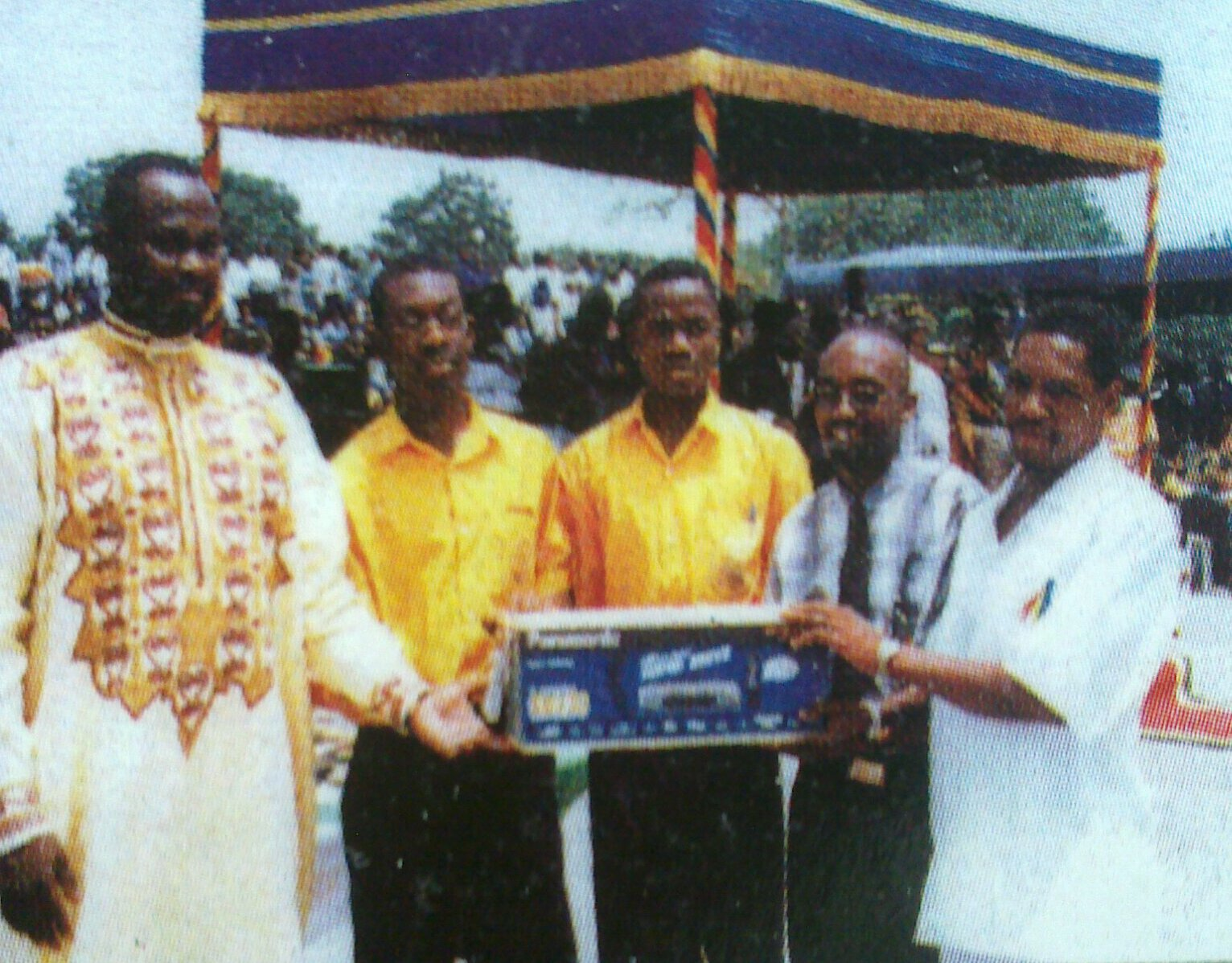
Pope John wins National Independence Day Debate 2000. Team members include renowned Ghanaian journalist Kojo Oppong Nkrumah, second from left.

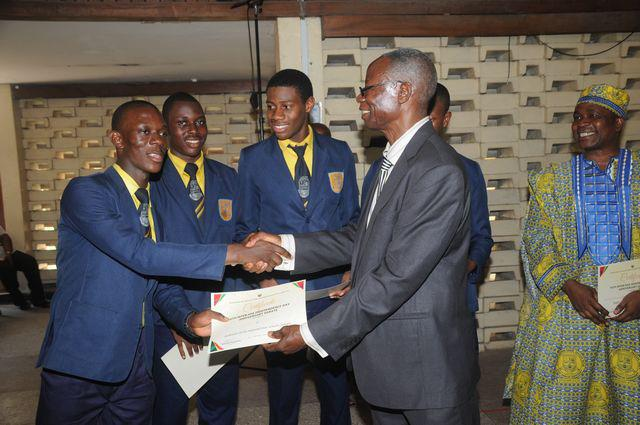
2013 National Independence Day Debate Victory

In 2012, the school placed 9th on the WASSCE order of merit (Education in Koforidua).

=== Awards, recognition ===
- VALCO Soccer Tournament (1999) (Winner)
- National Science and Maths Quiz (2001) (Winner)
- VALCO Soccer Tournament (2002) (Winner)
- Project Citizen National Showcase (2011) (Placed 3rd)
- Ghana Youth Forum Debate (2012) (Winner)
- National Independence Debate Championship (2013) (Winner)
- NSMQ 2023: Pope John Minor Seminary SHS Defeats PERSCO To Win Eastern Regional Championship.

=== Notable teachers ===
- Charles G. Palmer-Buckle (former chaplain and teacher)

== Notable alumni ==
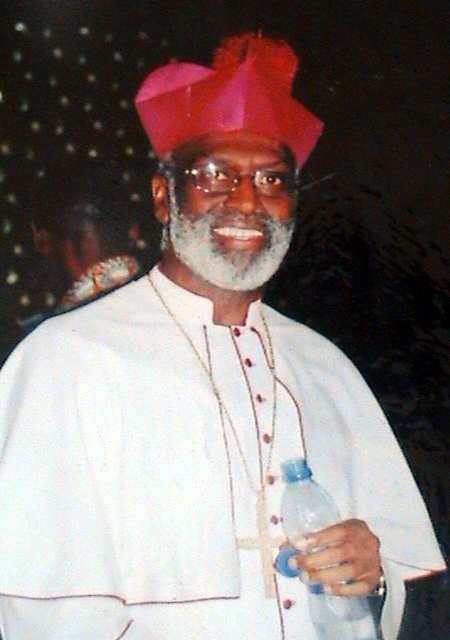
Archbishop Charles G. Palmer-Buckle, Archbishop of Cape Coast.

=== Clergy ===
- Archbishop Charles G. Palmer- Buckle, Metropolitan Archbishop of Cape Coast
- Dennis Kofi Agbenyadzi, Archbishop of the Roman Catholic Archdiocese of Berbérati, Central African Republic

=== Politics, government, and public policy ===
- Justice Nana Barima Yaw Kodie Oppong, Court of Appeal Judge
- Samuel Nuamah Donkor, Former MP for New Juaben North, Minister of Health and Ashanti Regional Minister
- Edward Omane Boamah, Former Minister of Defence
- Ebenezer Okletey Terlabi, MP for Lower Manya Krobo and Deputy Minister of Interior
- Kojo Oppong Nkrumah, MP for Ofoase-Ayirebi constituency and Former Minister of Information
- Paul Apreku Twum Barimah, Former MP for Dormaa East
- Kingsley Agyemang, MP for Akim Abuakwa South (Ghana parliament constituency)
- Nana Osei-Adjei, MP for New Juaben North (Ghana parliament constituency)
- Titus Kofi Beyuo, MP for Lambussie Constituency
- Franklin Cudjoe, Founder and President of IMANI Centre for Policy and Education
- Kwame Akuffo Anoff-Ntow, Former Director General of the Ghana Broadcasting Corporation
- Edmund Fianko, Director General of the National Communications Authority

=== Law enforcement ===
- Joseph Boateng Danquah, Former Chief of Defense Staff (CDS) of the Ghana Armed Forces and Member of Council of State
- Major General William Omane Agyekum, Commandant of Military Academy and Training Schools
- Major General Cornelius Kobla Lithur, Commandant of the Ghana Military Academy
- Brigadier General Kweku Asamoah Yeboah, Director General of International Peace Support Operations, Ghana Armed Forces

=== Academia ===
- William Otoo Ellis, former Vice Chancellor of KNUST
- Denis Worlanyo Aheto, Vice Chancellor of the University of Cape Coast

=== Corporate, business, and finance ===
- Maxwell Opoku-Afari, Economist and Former first Deputy Governor of the Bank of Ghana.
- Fredrick Odame, Vice President and Senior banking officer at PNC Bank

=== Arts and entertainment ===
- D-Black, Hip-hop star and entrepreneur
- Ibrahim Mahama (artist), Author and Artist of monumental installations

== See also ==
- Ministry of Education (Ghana)
- List of senior secondary schools in Ghana
- Joseph Oliver Bowers
- List of schools in Ghana
