= Rosemond Aboagyewa Boohene =

Ghanaian academic

Pro Vice-Chancellor of University of Cape Coast
- Incumbent
- Assumed office 1 January 2022
- Preceded by: Dora Francisca Edu-Buandoh

Personal details
- Born: Rosemond Boohene
- Education: University of Cape Coast; University of Otago; University of New England
- Alma mater: University of Cape Coast (BA); University of Otago (MCom; University of New England (PhD)
- Profession: Academic; University Administrator

Academic work
- Discipline: Accounting; Entrepreneurship
- Institutions: University of Cape Coast, Cape Coast

Rosemond Boohene is a Ghanaian academic, accountant, university administrator and entrepreneurship scholar who has been appointed as the Pro Vice Chancellor of the University of Cape Coast.

== Early life and education ==
She graduated from the University of Cape Coast with a Bachelor of Commerce (Hons) degree and a Diploma in Education. She subsequently obtained a Postgraduate Diploma in Commerce and Master of Commerce (Accounting) from the University of Otago, New Zealand. After that she obtained her PhD from the University of New England, Armidale, Australia. Professor Boohene subsequently studied at the Galilee College, Israel obtaining a Diploma in Small & Medium Scale Enterprises Management and Development. She was awarded a certificate in Facilitating and Designing E-Learning (Level 5) from the Open Polytechnic, New Zealand. Professor Boohene is a German Academic Exchange Service (DAAD) Scholar.

Rosemond has participated in various training programmes in higher education management including the Senior Academic Leadership Training for Senior University Managers at the University of Ghana; Management of Internationalisation at the Leibniz University, Germany; Higher Education Management for Anglophone African Countries at the Zhejiang Normal University, Jinhua China; and Higher Education Management and Leadership at the University of Osnabruck, Germany.

== Career ==
Boohene began her career as a lecturer at the business school at the University of Cape Coast. She previously served as the director of the Centre for Entrepreneurship and Small Enterprise Development. She was the former head of Management Studies Department, vice-dean of the school of business, dean for international education, University of Cape Coast. She was a visiting professor at the Bonn-Rhein-Sieg University of Applied Sciences, Germany.

She worked for the Council for Technical, Vocational Education and Training (COTVET) and worked as an expert trainer at various workshops for Coastal Network Consortium to improve the capacities of personnel of District Assemblies on the Functional and Organisational Assessment Tool (FOAT) project. She worked on numerous projects funded by the EXIM Bank Ghana, Rainforest Alliance, European Union (EU), the German Federal Ministry for Economic Co-operation and Development (BMZ), and the United Nations Office of Project Services (UNOPS) on Small and Medium-Sized Enterprises, Electronic Waste Management and Entrepreneurship.

She led a pioneer team that founded the Centre for Entrepreneurship and Small Enterprise Development, the Design Thinking and Innovation Hub, the University of Cape Coast Business incubator. She spearheaded the implementation of an entrepreneurship course at all levels of the University of Cape Coast. She consulted for and worked with her peers from the University of Turku, Finland to develop a United Nations Economic Commission for Africa (UNECA) sponsored online course for entrepreneurial universities.

=== Memberships and fellowships ===
- Member/Chair, Ghana Tertiary Education Commission (GTEC)/National Accreditation Board (NAB)
- Association of African Universities (AAU)
- Fellow, German Academic Exchange Service (DAAD)

== Research ==
Boohene's research interests is in the area of entrepreneurship development, accounting and management of small and medium-sized businesses.

== Personal life ==
Professor Boohene is married with children.
