= Nii Kwartei Titus Glover =

Ghanaian politician (born 1966)

Nii Kwartei Titus Glover MP

Deputy Minister for Transport
- In office March 2017 – January 2021
- President: Nana Akuffo-Addo
- Preceded by: Joyce Bawah Mogtari

Member of Ghana Parliament for Tema East Constituency
- In office January 2013 – January 2021
- Preceded by: Samuel Evans Ashong Narh
- Succeeded by: Isaac Ashai Odamtten

Personal details
- Born: Daniel Nii Kwartei Titus Glover; 28 August 1966 (age 60) Asere-Ga Mashie, Ghana
- Party: New Patriotic Party
- Children: 6
- Education: University of Cape Coast; Warwick University

Daniel Nii Kwartei Titus Glover (born 28 August 1966) is a Ghanaian politician and the Member of Parliament of Tema East constituency. He is a member of the New Patriotic Party and the Deputy Minister of Transport in Ghana.

== Early life ==
Glover was born on 28 August 1966 in Asere-Ga Mashie in the Greater Accra Region.

Glover had a year of secondary education at the Nungua Presbyterian Secondary School in 1981. He studied for and obtained his ordinary level certificate at the Presbyterian Boy's Senior High School, Legon between 1982 and 1986. He continued at the Accra Academy privately from 1987 to 1988 and obtained his Advanced Level Certificate. Glover holds a master's degree from Warwick University, Coventry. He also has a certificate of higher education from Ruskin College, Oxford, and a certificate in labour studies from University of Cape Coast.

== Personal life ==
He is a member of the Miracle Life Gospel Church. He is married with four children.

== Politics ==
Glover is a member of the New Patriotic Party (NPP). In 2012, he won the Tema East seat on the NPP ticket for the sixth parliament of the fourth republic.

He contested in the 2020 Ghanaian general election as the parliamentary candidate for the New Patriotic Party. and lost his seat to his National Democratic Congress (Ghana) opponent, Isaac Ashai Odamtten

== Employment ==
He works as a human resources manager for Ken City Media Ltd.
