= Isaac Odamtten =

Ghanaian politician

Hon. Isaac Odamtten MP
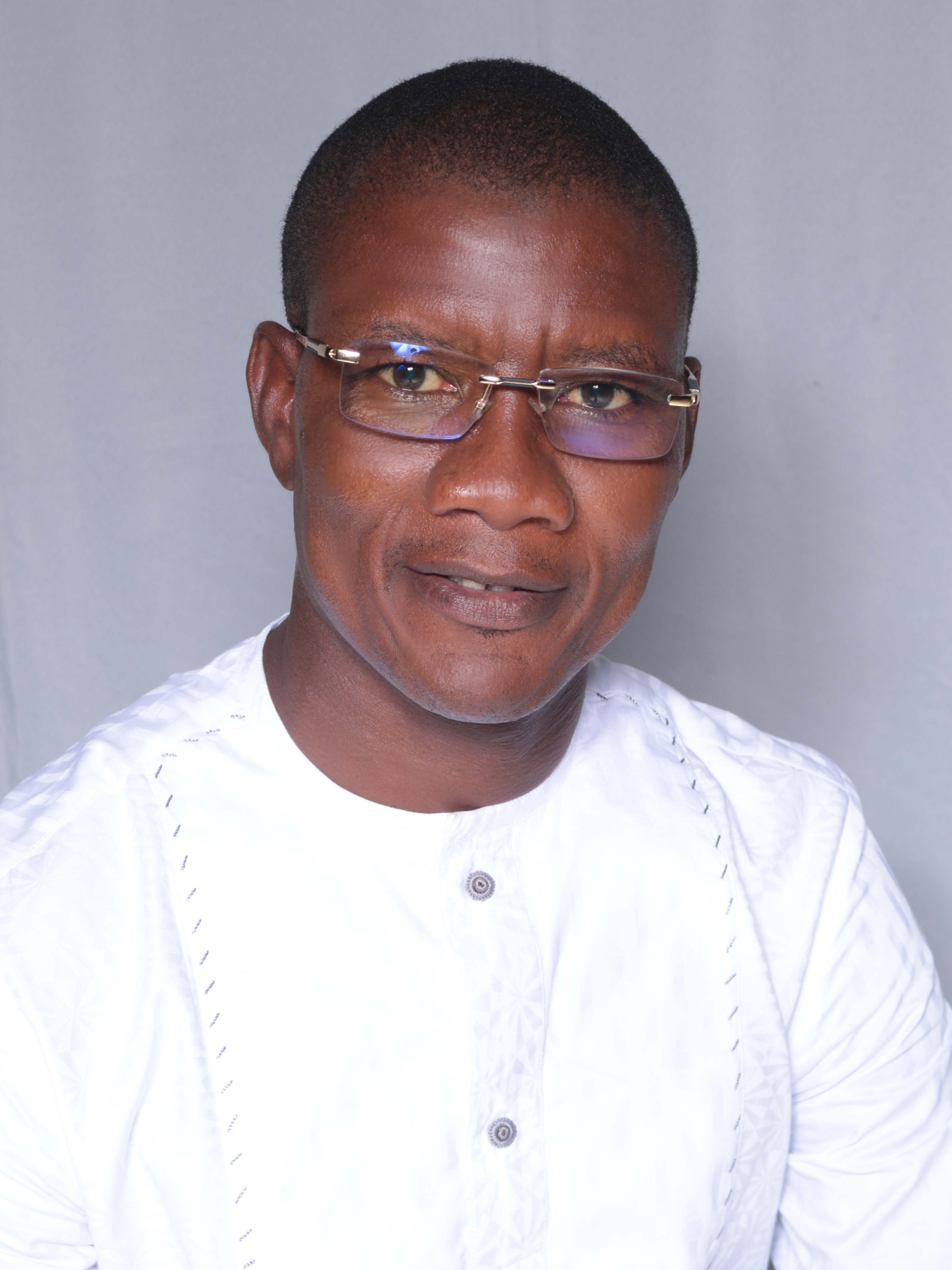

Member of Parliament Elect for Tema East Constituency
- Incumbent
- Assumed office 7 January 2021
- Preceded by: Daniel Titus Glover

Personal details
- Born: Isaac Ashai Odamtten; 13 May 1972 (age 54) Ghana
- Party: National Democratic Congress
- Occupation: Teacher, politician

Isaac Ashai Odamtten (born 13 May 1972) is a Ghanaian politician who is a member of the National Democratic Congress. He is the member of Parliament Elect for the Tema East Constituency. From 2013 to 2017, he served the Mayor and Metropolitan Chief Executive of Tema Metropolitan Area.

== Early life and education ==
Odamtten was born on 13 May 1972. He is a native of Tema in the Greater Accra Region of Ghana. He completed the University of Cape Coast in 1999 with bachelor of commerce degree (BCom). He holds a Master of Business administration (MBA) in Accounting, Master of Arts (MPT) from Oral Robert University in 2025 and a certificate in project management.

== Career ==
=== Early career ===
Odamtten is a teacher by profession and started his career as a tutor for the Ghana Education Service before rising to become a Finance officer and Bursar under the same institution. He moved to the International Commercial Bank to serve as the head of finance and senior manager of corporate services before being nominated by John Dramani Mahama to serve as Mayor of Tema in 2013. He also got elected as the president of the National Association of Local Authorities of Ghana (NALAG) in March 2016.

=== Mayor of Tema ===
He served as Mayor and Metropolitan Chief Executive of the Tema Metropolitan Assembly from 2013 to 2017. One of his achievements was connected to helping fishermen and boosting the fisheries and aquaculture sector to generate more income through the provision of outboard motors to fishermen associations within Tema.

On 3 March 2016, he was elected as the president of the National Association of Local Authorities of Ghana (NALAG) and sworn in during the 19th biennial national delegates conference held in Sunyani. He was sworn in after polling 624 votes out the 980 total valid votes cast to beat his sole contender, James Gunu, the district chief executive (DCE) for Akatsi North, who canvassed 356 votes.

He served as a member of the 16-member executive committee of the United Cities and Local Governments of Africa (UCLG Africa). He served as one of the two board members representing West Africa on the Commonwealth Local Government Forum (CLGF).

On World Cities Day 2016, and following Habitat III, he was one of the speakers brought in from cities around the world as a result of Overseas Development Institute (ODI) Global Challenges event to explore how urban areas can deliver their global SDG goals.

From the 16 to 22 March 2016, he led a delegation on a visit to the Royal Borough of Greenwich with support from GUBA Enterprise led by Dentaa. The visit was part of a twinning link partnership between the city of Tema and the Royal Borough of Greenwich involving co-operation between the two communities in areas of Education, Sports and Governance.

== Politics ==
=== Parliamentary bid ===
Odamtten won the parliamentary bid to represent the National Democratic Congress for the Tema East Constituency ahead of the 2020 elections.

In December 2020, Odamtten beat the incumbent Member of Parliament for Tema East Constituency Daniel Titus Glover with 41,692 votes as against 31,956 votes to win the seat in the 2020 Elections.

=== Member of Parliament ===
On 7 January 2021, Odamtten was sworn in as the Member of Parliament representing the Tema East Constituency in the 8th Parliament of the 4th Republic of Ghana. He serves as a member on the Gender and Children Committee and the Employment, Social Welfare and State Enterprises Committee of Parliament.

Odamtten secured a second term in Parliament with a victory in the 2024 elections. He garnered 37,231 votes, representing 61.73%, while his opponent, Yohane Amarh Ashitey of the NPP, received 23,081 votes, accounting for 38.27%.

== Personal life ==
Odamtten is a Christian.
