= Denis Worlanyo Aheto =

Ghanaian academic and marine scientist (born 1972)

- Prof. Denis Worlanyo Aheto (right) and Dr. Jeff Bordes (Left)

Vice-Chancellor of University of Cape Coast
- Incumbent
- Assumed office 24 September 2025
- Preceded by: Johnson Nyarko Boampong

Personal details
- Born: Denis Worlanyo Aheto; April 1, 1972 (age 54) Nsawam, Eastern Region, Ghana
- Education: St. Martin's Secondary School; Pope John Secondary School
- Alma mater: University of Cape Coast (BSc); Swedish University of Agricultural Sciences (MSc); University of Bremen (MSc; PhD)
- Profession: Academic; University Administrator
- Website: directory.ucc.edu.gh/p/denis-worlanyo-aheto

Academic work
- Discipline: Marine science
- Institutions: University of Cape Coast

Denis Worlanyo Aheto, born on 1 April 1972 at Nsawam in the Eastern Region, is a Ghanaian academic, marine scientist, university administrator and the current Vice-Chancellor of the University of Cape Coast. He is the founding director of the Centre for Coastal Management (CCM) and the Africa Centre of Excellence in Coastal Resilience (ACECoR), a research and capacity-building initiative focused on coastal resilience and sustainable ocean governance in Africa.

Aheto's research focuses on coastal and marine ecosystem conservation, wetlands ecology, small-scale fisheries governance, marine spatial planning, and ocean conflict management. He has led numerous internationally funded research projects and capacity-building initiatives supported by organizations such as the World Bank, the African Union, the United States Agency for International Development (USAID), and the Danish International Development Agency (DANIDA). His scholarly work has contributed significantly to coastal management policy and marine conservation in West Africa.

== Early life and education ==
Denis Worlanyo in the Eastern Region of Ghana, completed his secondary education at St. Martin's Secondary School in Nsawam, obtaining his O-Level certificate in 1990, and later attended Pope John Secondary School and Minor Seminary in Koforidua, where he completed his A-Level studies in 1992.

Aheto pursued undergraduate studies at the University of Cape Coast, earning a Bachelor of Science (Hons) in Biological Sciences and a Diploma in Education in 1998.

He later pursued postgraduate studies internationally. In 2002, he obtained a Master of Science in Rural Development from the Swedish University of Agricultural Sciences. He subsequently studied at the University of Bremen, where he earned:

- MSc in Tropical Aquatic Ecology (2004)
- PhD in Environmental Science (2008)

His doctoral research focused on ecological processes and management challenges in tropical marine and coastal ecosystems.

== Career ==
Aheto began his academic career at the University of Cape Coast as a Teaching Assistant (1998–1999) shortly after completing his undergraduate studies.

In 1999 he briefly served as a biology teacher at St. Augustine's College under the Ghana Education Service.

Following completion of his doctoral studies in Germany, he returned to the University of Cape Coast and joined the Department of Fisheries and Aquatic Sciences as a lecturer in 2009. He was promoted to Senior Lecturer (2013–2017), later becoming Associate Professor, and in 2020 was appointed Full Professor of Coastal Ecology and Interdisciplinary Ocean Studies.

He served as Head of the Department of Fisheries and Aquatic Sciences (2012–2016) and later became Director of the Centre for Coastal Management (CCM). Under his leadership the centre developed into a major hub for marine research and policy engagement in Africa and became the host institution for the Africa Centre of Excellence in Coastal Resilience (ACECoR) supported by the World Bank.

In December 2024, the Governing Council of the University of Cape Coast appointed Aheto as Pro Vice-Chancellor, with a three-year term beginning 1 January 2025 and ending 31 December 2027.

In September 2025, he was appointed Acting Vice-Chancellor of the University of Cape Coast following a directive from the Ghana Tertiary Education Commission during a leadership transition at the university. He later assumed the role permanently on 15 May 2026.

During his tenure in university leadership, Aheto has advocated for strengthened partnerships between universities, governments, and private sector actors to advance research, innovation, and infrastructure development in higher education.
