= Mercy Catherine Adjabeng =

Ghanaian author, writer and reporter

- Occupations: Editor-in-chief, Author
- Notable work: Discovery Teen Magazine

Mercy Catherine Adjabeng is a Ghanaian author, editor-in-chief and Managing Editor of the Discovery Teen Magazine. She is also the Communications and Media Advisor of Women in Law and Development in Africa (WiLDAF).

== Education ==
Adjabeng studied at the University of Cape Coast for her Bachelor of Education degree in Psychology with English from 1994 to 1998. She is a communications specialist, gender advocate, writer, and public speaker with a record of working in the government, NGO & Education industry and Diplomatic community. She has skills in advocacy, strategic planning, and media management.

She also earned qualifications from the following institutions:

Certificate	Institution	Year awarded
Executive Certificate, Project Management Certificate	PRINCE 2 Overview, PMProfessional Learning, London	2007
Executive Certificate, Leadership Certificate	African Women's Leadership Institute, Uganda	2010
Post Graduate Certificate, Advocacy & Citizen engagement, Certificate	The Coady International Institute, Canada	2011
Good Governance & Social Accountability Tools, Communication & Social Media Certificate	The Coady International Institute, Canada	2012
Executive Certificate for Managers & Policy Makers, Social Safety Net Core Course Certificate	The World Bank: Social Protection & Labor Human Development Network	2013
Executive Certificate for Managers & Policy Makers Reform Communication: Leadership, Strategy & Stakeholder Alignment Certificate	World Bank Institute & USC Annenberg School for Communication	2014

== Career ==
Adjabeng is a former English language and literature teacher at Wesley Girls' High School in Cape Coast. She interviewed the US Ambassador to Ghana, Robert Potter Jackson. She partnered with French Embassy in Ghana, GOLDKEY Properties and UNFPA Ghana to launch the Discovery Teen Magazine and the Discovery Teen Chat forum. She has also partnered with Stanbic Bank Ghana, I-ZAR Group, Effe Farms and Trading Enterprise among others. She currently works at 3FM. She is also the Research and Public Affairs Officer of the Australian High Commission in Ghana.

== Philanthropy ==
Adjabeng seeks to address issues confronting teenagers like challenges they face at their teen stage. She donated her book called Understanding English Literature to Wesley Girls' High School. The books donated were claimed to worth GH¢6,000.

She also donated her books to St. Thomas Aquinas and Forces Secondary Technical School in Accra.
