= Alfred P. Addaquay =

Ghanaian musician

- Also known as: Addaquay
- Born: Alfred Patrick Addaquay; 17 September 1985; Kumasi, Ghana
- Genres: Classical, Art music
- Years active: 1997 -

Alfred Patrick Addaquay (born 17 September 1985) is an associate professor of musicology at the department of music (University of Ghana). He is a product of the Mfantsipim School and the University of Cape Coast. He has several publications and compositions to his name and performed his first oratorio, titled "Laudateur Christus", an African Cantata named Afe Nsakrae, a Ghanaian Sonata kyekyekule, a Concerto titled "Sanku Concerto" and many more

== Early life and education ==
Alfred Patrick Addaquay was born in Kumasi in the Ashanti Region of Ghana. He was enrolled at the Kwame Nkrumah University of Science and Technology primary school. He started learning to play the piano at an early age and continued all through his primary education. Addaquay's music skills was first came to the fore from 1994 when he played for several Ghanaian choral groups. He was admitted to the elite Mfantsipim School in the year 2001, Cape Coast. Upon being admitted to Mfantsipim School, a new set of audience became aware of his music skills and he was appointed the school's junior organist in form one and later became the school's principal organist. From 2001 to 2004 he really entertained students and teachers of the school with his music talent in such a way that he was always a topic to discuss by students, parents and old boys of the school. He was mentored by Peter Lyte Koomson, a music tutor at the school. Whilst at Mfantsipim School, he received several music prizes and was awarded the discovery of the year 2002 by the school. He was the first recipient of the award. In 2003, he received the "Initiative & Drive" award for his keyboard performances.

After graduation from Mfantsipim in 2004, Addaquay gained admission to the University of Cape Coast. He graduated in 2009 with a Bachelor of Music degree. He enrolled at the same university and pursued a Master of Philosophy in music theory and composition. He continued with his PhD (in music theory and Composition) and successfully completed in March 2020. He was appointed as a lecturer in the University of Ghana in November 2021. He became a senior lecturer in the year 2024 and promoted to the rank of an associate professor in musicology in September 2026.

== Music career ==
Addaquay composed his first oratorio, comprising 32 classical music pieces, in 2006, at the age of 20; it was called "Laudate". The two-hour oratorio, performed before an audience at the University of Cape Coast Auditorium, was the first of its kind in Ghana in 2005. His compositions include a cantata titled "Afe Nsakrae". In 2016, Addaquay revised his first oratorio and called it the Laudatur Christus.
