= Doris Dartey =

Ghanaian female journalist (died 2020)

- Died: 2020
- Citizenship: Ghana
- Education: University of Cape Coast
- Occupation: Journalist

Doris Yaa Korantenmaa Dartey (died 19 July 2020) was a Ghanaian communication educator, consultant and onetime member and chairperson of GJA Awards Committee. She was the former chairperson of the Graphic Communications Group Limited in Ghana.

== Education ==
Dartey studied at the University of Cape Coast, where she graduated with BA in education. She also obtained a graduate diploma in journalism and mass communication from the School of Communication Studies at University of Ghana, and an MA in international affairs (development communication), a graduate diploma in women's studies and a PhD in organizational communication from Ohio University in the US.

== Career ==
She was a communication consultant and worked for donor-funded projects such as African Union Commission, African Development Bank, UNESCO, GIZ, among others.

She also served as a member on the National Media Commission before she became a chairperson of the board of directors of GCGL. She taught communication courses in the USA and Ghana at the University of Dayton, Mount Mercy University, GIMPA, and GIJ.

She was a journalist and hosted some programs in Ghana for some years. She also wrote a column in The Spectator newspaper in Ghana called The WatchWoman which talked about environmental issues, sanitation, health, children and other societal issues. She was a mentor of many journalists, communicators and public relations practitioners in Ghana.

== Personal life ==
She had One daughter and One son.

== Death ==
She died at KBTH in Accra on Sunday, 19 July 2020 after succumbing to complications of breast cancer. She was laid to rest at the Lashibi Funeral Home, a place near Tema.
