= Millison Narh =

Ghanaian banker and chartered accountant (1955–2023)

Deputy Governor, Bank of Ghana
- In office 20 July 2009 – 31 July 2017
- President: John Dramani Mahama
- Preceded by: Kofi Wampah
- Succeeded by: Nashiru

30th

Personal details
- Born: 4 May 1955
- Died: 8 July 2023 (aged 68) United States
- Education: University of Cape Coast (B.Com.)

Millison Kwadwo Narh (4 May 1955 – 8 July 2023) was a Ghanaian banker and chartered accountant, who was the deputy governor of the Bank of Ghana from 2009 to 2017.

== Early life and education ==
Millison Kwadwo Narh was born in May 1955. He trained as a chartered accountant at Accra Polytechnic from 1976 to 1979. Then he studied at the University of Cape Coast from 1979 to 1983 where he took a diploma in education and a Bachelor of Commerce. After this he took a master's degree in banking and finance at Finafrica Foundation in Milan in Italy.

== Career ==
Narh started working in the Central Bank as early as 1976, after completing Ghanata Secondary School. From 1993 to 1995, he was Chief Manager, leading the division for domestic banking industry. He led the Central Bank's department for central bank branches from 1996 to 1999, where he was responsible for establishing five new branches. He had two stints at the National Banking College, the first stint was from 1995 to 1997, when he was chief adviser to the College, and the second time (a short period) from June to October 2001, when he was acting Principal.

From 2001 to 2002, Narh was deputy director and chief internal auditor in the central bank's internal audit department, and after that, until 2008, he was director of the department responsible for the banking industry. In the period, he was responsible for both domestic and foreign banks, and led five branches with a total of 500 employees. Before his appointment to the Deputy Governor position, he had served the Bank of Ghana for 33 years.

In May 2009, Narh was promoted to second deputy governor by President John Atta Mills. In August 2013 he was promoted to first deputy governor. Abdul-Nasir Ishaq took over when Narh was made the first deputy governor.

== Death ==
Narh died in the United States on 8 July 2023, at the age of 68.
