= Maxwell Opoku-Afari =

Ghananian economist

1st Deputy Governor of the Bank of Ghana
- Incumbent
- Assumed office August 2017
- President: Nana Akuffo-Addo

Personal details
- Born: Ghana
- Education: Pope John Senior High School and Minor Seminary, University of Ghana, University of Nottingham
- Occupation: Banker
- Profession: Economist

Maxwell Opoku-Afari is a Ghanaian economist and currently the First Deputy Governor of the Bank of Ghana. He was appointed to this position on August 7, 2017.

Prior to assuming the role of Deputy Governor, Opoku-Afari worked at the International Monetary Fund (IMF). Opoku-Afari also worked for 13 years at the Bank of Ghana, rising through the ranks to become the Head of the Special Studies Division in the Research Department between January 2005 and June 2006, and later elevated to the position of the Special Assistant to the Governor of Bank of Ghana from June 2006 until he left the Bank of Ghana in October 2009.

== Education ==
Opoku-Afari attended the Pope John Senior High School and Minor Seminary from 1987 to 1989. After graduating, he went to University of Ghana, Legon for his first degree in economics and statistics and an MPhil in economics. In 2004, he obtained a Ph.D. in economics from the University of Nottingham in the United Kingdom.

== Career ==
Prior to assuming the role of Deputy Governor, Opoku-Afari worked at the International Monetary Fund (IMF) from December 2009, rising through the ranks to the level of Deputy Division Chief and Mission Chief. He was the Deputy Division Chief in the Regional Studies Division in the African Department of the IMF where he led and supervised the production of one of the IMF's flagship publication—the Regional Economic Outlook for sub-Saharan Africa. In addition, he also served as the Mission Chief for Mauritius, where he led policy discussions on a wide range of issues including the financial sector, macro-financial linkages, fiscal and monetary policies, and growth strategies. He previously worked in the Strategy, Policy and Review Department of the IMF.

While at the IMF, Opoku-Afari participated in IMF negotiation missions to several African and Caribbean countries and handled extensive policy discussions on Rwanda, Zambia, Jamaica and Sao Tome and Principe—where he led the program negotiation mission in 2015. He was also a reviewer of country policy documents for a number of developing countries.

Prior to joining the IMF in 2009, Opoku-Afari worked for 13 years at the Bank of Ghana, rising through the ranks to become the Head of the Special Studies Division in the Research Department between January 2005 and June 2006, and later elevated to the position of the Special Assistant to the Governor of Bank of Ghana from June 2006 until he left the Bank of Ghana in October 2009. He was also a member of the Government of Ghana's Capital Markets Committee from 2006 to 2008.

Opoku-Afari's work at the IMF also focused on policy design, in particular, on monetary policy modernization and macro-financial linkages. He has co-authored a number of IMF Policy Papers including one on “Modernizing Monetary Policy Frameworks in Low and Developing Countries” and another on “Monetary Policy Conditionality for Countries with Evolving Monetary Policy Regimes”. These two policy papers are currently being used to drive modernization of monetary policy frameworks in a number of low and developing countries. He has extensive publications on monetary policy, inclusive growth, short-term output indicators in low income countries, aid effectiveness, and on capital flows and real exchange rate dynamics.

=== Other positions ===
As First Deputy Governor of the Bank of Ghana, Opoku-Afari serves as a member on many Government of Ghana agencies and committees that deal with financial policy and management, including:

- Member Board of Directors of Bank of Ghana (August 2017 to present)
- Member Monetary Policy Committee of Bank of Ghana (August 2017 to present)
- Alternate Governor at the IMF for the Government of Ghana (October 2017 to present)
- Appointed Member of the Government of Ghana Post-COVID-19 Pandemic Economic Revitalization Team of Experts (March 2020 to present)
- Alternate Chair of National Payments Systems Advisory Council (December 2019 to present)
- Chair of Governing Council, Ghana Fixed Income Market (August 2017 to present)
- Board Member, Ghana Minerals Income Investment Fund (January 2019 to present)
- Board Member, Ghana Interbank Payments and Settlement Systems—GhIPSS (August 2017 to present)
- Board Member, Ghana Revenue Authority—GRA (August 2017 to present)
- Board Member, Ghana Investment Promotion Center—GIPC (January 2018 to present)
- Board Member, Ghana Data Protection Commission (January 2018 to present)
- Chair of Governing Council, National Banking College (August 2017 to present)
- Board Chair, Ghana Central Securities Depository (August 2017 to present)
- Board Chair, African Rural and Agricultural Credit Association (AFRACA), Nairobi, Kenya (August 2017 – July 2019)
- Member and Deputy Board Chair, Ghana International Bank, PLC (A United Kingdom-Based PRA and FCA Regulated Financial Institution) - (January 2018 to present)
- Member and co-chair, Economic Policy Coordinating Committee of the Government of Ghana (August 2018 to present)
- Member and Key Presenter to Investors for all Government of Ghana Sovereign Bond Programmes (August 2017 to present)

== Works ==
Opoku-Afari's work at the IMF focused on policy design, in particular, on monetary policy modernization and macro-financial linkages. He has co-authored a number of IMF Policy Papers including one on “Modernizing Monetary Policy Frameworks in Low and Developing Countries” and another on “Monetary Policy Conditionality for Countries with Evolving Monetary Policy Regimes”.

These two policy papers are currently being used to drive modernization of monetary policy frameworks in a number of low and developing countries. He has extensive publications on monetary policy, inclusive growth, short-term output indicators in low income countries, aid effectiveness, and on capital flows and real exchange rate dynamics.

He is the author and co-author of the following works:

- 2000, “A Review of the Literature on Financial Sector Reform and its Impact on the Poor: Any Lessons from Ghana?” (with E.K.Y Addison and M. Bawumia). A Research Project Funded by the Social Unit of the Enterprise & Co-operative Development Department of ILO and the Government of Netherlands, November, 2000.
- 2004, “Measurement of Real Effective Exchange Rate (REER) in Ghana” CREDIT Research Paper 04/11, University of Nottingham, UK.
- 2004, “Real Exchange Rate Response to Capital Inflows: A Dynamic Analysis for Ghana” CREDIT Research Paper 04/12, University of Nottingham, UK (with Morrissey, O and Lloyd, T).
- 2005, “The Future of Domestic Capital Markets in Developing Countries”. Edited by Robert Litan, Michael Pomerleano and V SUNDARARAJAN (Washington DC: Brookings Institution Press, 2003, pp. 532, p/bk £29.00), Journal of International Development, 2005, 17 (8), pp: 1097–8.
- 2007, “Capital Flows and Current Account Sustainability: The Ghanaian Experience” CREDIT Research Paper 07/07, University of Nottingham, UK.
- 2009, “Fiscal Effects of Aid in Developing Countries: A Comparative Dynamic Analysis” in Mavrotas G. and McGillivray, M (eds.) Development Aid: A Fresh Look, Palgrave Macmillan Publishers (with Lloyd, T, McGillivray, M. and Morrissey, O).
- 2012, “Tracking Short Term Dynamics of Economic Activity in LICs in the Absence of High Frequency Data” IMF Working Paper 12/119 (with S. Dixit).
- 2013, “Inclusive Growth: Application of the Social Opportunity Function to Selected African Countries” IMF Working Paper 13/139 (with O. Adedeji, and H Du).
- 2014, “Exchange Rate Dynamics and Monetary Integration in the EAC” –Submitted to Journal of African Economies (with S. Cuiabano).
