= Our Lady of Apostles College of Education =

Teachers training college in Cape Coast, Ghana

Our Lady of Apostles (OLA) College of Education
- Motto: Semper Fidelis
- Established: 1924; 102 years ago
- Affiliations: University of Cape Coast
- Principal: Dr Mrs Regina Okyere-Dankwa
- Location: Cape Coast, Central Region, Ghana; 5°6′14.9″N 1°16′25″W
- Nickname: OLA

Our Lady of Apostles (OLA) College of Education (formerly OLA Training College) is a women's college of education in Cape Coast, Ghana. It is one of 46 public colleges of education in Ghana and participates in the DFID-funded T-TEL programme. The principal is Dr. Regina Okyere-Dankwa.

The college is affiliated with the University of Cape Coast.

== Education ==
At the 8th congregation ceremony in 2015, 275 student teachers were awarded a Diploma in Basic Education. The college,during the diploma period offered specialisations in Early Childhood Education, Science and Mathematics Education, and Social Science.

At the 14th Congregation in 2021, OLA College of Education recorded 40 First Class Honours for the last batch of Diploma in Basic Education Teacher-Trainees.

OLA College currently runs 4-year Bachelor of Education programmes in Early Childhood (Early Grade) Education, Primary education, and Junior High School (JHS) Education.

== History ==
The Sisters of Our Lady of Apostles, a Catholic Missionary order, established the college in 1924. The college participated in the Sabre Trust's Fast-track Transformational Teacher Training programme in 2016.

Our Lady of Apostles (OLA) College of Education, formerly known as OLA Training College, was established by the Missionary Sisters of Our Lady of Apostles (a Catholic Missionary Order). The College started in 1924 in a room at Saint Mary's Convent School, Cape Coast when Rev. Mother Acquiline Tobin anticipated the need to train Ghanaian female teachers to help the white Sisters in running their convent schools. Thus, with the support of her Religious Order, Mother Acquiline began the training of four Ghanaian girls who had completed Middle school with an outstanding performance from OLA Girls Senior High School (Ho).

To meet various teacher needs of the country, the college has run various pre-service teacher training programmes at different times.

- From 1926 to 1960 the College operated as a two-year certificate ‘B’ College.
- In 1960 a 4-year certificate ‘A’ teachers’ programme was started. A parallel two-year post ‘B’ programme was run alongside to upgrade certificate ‘B’ teachers to Certificate ‘A’.
- Between 1968 and 1973 the College was charged to run a specialist home economics course to train teachers for the country's experimental junior secondary schools which were about starting.
- In 1975 the college embraced a new educational reform and introduced the three-year post-secondary teachers’ programme which became the focal point for the training of teachers for almost thirty years.
- In September 2002, a new Teacher Education Policy dubbed IN-IN-OUT was born, which followed a reform of upgrading teacher training colleges into diploma awarding institutions introduced in October 2004.

The college's student population has grown considerably over the years. Their enrollment, which rose to 280 in 1962, now stands at 1,387. The academic staff establishment is 62, made up of 30 female and 32 male tutors, and the non-teaching supporting staff is 50. The growth is reflected in the expansion of the College's physical plant made in recent years by the Government of Ghana through the Ministry of Education (Ghana), and with support from other development partners: the Japan International Cooperation Agency(JICA), Arrownetworks, the International Foundation for Education and Self-Help (IFESH), UNESCO, Irish Aid and Mercy Education Fund (USA), and OLA Sisters International. Other physical development projects include a 1500-capacity assembly hall, a resource centre, a science complex, a modern library complex, lecture halls, and an e-learning centre.

Roll of Principals:
Name	Years served
Rev. Mother Acquiline Tobin	1924 – 1928
Rev. Mother Patricia Loughane	1928 – 1930
Rev. Mother Acquiline Tobin	1930 – 1932
Rev. Sister Angela O’Mahony	1932 – 1934
Rev. Sister Borgia Thomas	1934 – 1937
Rev. Sister Salve O’Reilly	1937 – 1938
Rev. Sister Borgia Thomas	1938 – 1943
College was transferred to Holy Child School 1946 – 1953	
Rev. Sister Francis de Sales Conlon	1960 – 1966
Rev. Sister Colombiere O’Driscoll	1966 – 1971
Rev. Sister Mary Rita O’Mahony	1971 – 1977
Agnes Koranteng	1977 – 2002
Rev. Sister Elizabeth Amoako-Arhen-	2002 – 2020
Dr. Regina Okyere-Dankwa	2021 – present

== Anniversary ==
On 8 April 2024, OLA marked its centenary anniversary. The anniversary was celebrated on the theme: "100 years of teacher training, retrospection and prospects”. The occasion was attended by dignitaries including the second lady of Ghana, Mrs. Samira Bawumia.

== See also ==
- List of colleges of education in Ghana
