= Nana Osei-Adjei =

Ghanaian politician and Banker

Hon. Nana Osei-Adjei

Member of the Ghanaian Parliament for New Juaben North
- Incumbent
- Assumed office 07 January 2025
- President: John Mahama

Personal details
- Born: 2 February 1975 (age 51) Jumapo Koforidua, Ghana
- Party: New Patriotic Party
- Education: Pope John Senior High School and Minor Seminary; Kwame Nkrumah University of Science and Technology; GIMPA
- Occupation: Politician, Banker

Nana Osei-Adjei (born 2 February 1975) is a Ghanaian politician and banker. He is a member of the ninth parliament of the fourth Republic of Ghana and the member of parliament for the New Juaben North (Ghana parliament constituency) succeeding Kwasi Boateng Adjei.

== Early life and education ==
Osei-Adjei was born in Jumapo Koforidua, in the Eastern Region of Ghana. He attended Pope John Senior High School and Minor Seminary for his senior high education and later proceeded to the Kwame Nkrumah University of Science and Technology for his Bachelor of Science in Agriculture degree. In 2013, he earned a Bachelor of Laws from the Ghana Institute of Management and Public Administration (GIMPA).

== Career ==
Osei-Adjei worked as a banker with Ghana's Agriculture Development Bank as Executive Head Parastatals and Institutional Banking before entering into mainstream politics.

== Politics ==
In January 2024, he contested and won the NPP parliamentary primaries for New Juaben North (Ghana parliament constituency) in the Eastern Region of Ghana. In December 2024, he contested the 2024 Ghanaian general election and won with 17,390 votes beating his closest contender,National Democratic Congress (Ghana)'s candidate, Samuel Adongo who polled 10,600 votes.
