= Panafest =

Ghanaian cultural event

The Pan African Historical Theatre Project now known as PANAFEST is a cultural event held in Ghana every two years for Africans and people of African descent. It was first held in 1992. The idea of this festival is to promote and enhance unity, Pan-Africanism, and the development of the continent of Africa itself. Activities that occur at this festival are performances and work in the areas of theatre, drama, music, and poetry, among other things. Also, there are viewing of the durbar of chiefs, and tours to various places of interest, such as slave castle dungeons.

== Impetus and objectives ==
PANAFEST was mooted by the late Efua Sutherland in the mid-1980s as a cultural vehicle for bringing Africans on the continent and in the diaspora together around the issues raised by slavery that remain suppressed. PANAFEST addresses the most traumatic interruption that ever occurred in the natural evolution of African societies, which among other traumas profoundly eroded the self-confidence and freedom for self-determination of a whole people. Ghana's coastline is dotted with now silent memorials to over 500 years of this most turbulent era in Africa's history, which the festival consciously makes a site for confronting the effects of enslavement, purging the pain of the diaspora, acknowledging the residual effects of the trade on the African continent and re-uniting to forge a positive future in the contemporary global environment.

Alongside the healing processes, PANAFEST celebrates the strengths and resilience of African culture and achievements of Africans in spite of the transatlantic slave trade and its aftermath. It is designed to help Africans to reconnect with their strengths and thus be inspired to eternal vigilance, rededicate themselves to fully assuming the reigns of their own destiny in recognition of the lessons of history. There are today urgent developments making this proudly Ghanaian initiative a vital and relevant platform that provides members of the African family with the opportunity to engage with each other in forthright communication. Among these are negatives such as human trafficking from the continent, the brain drain, marginalization of Africans in a global knowledge economy, the renewed surge of external pursuit of African natural resources and the slowness of African unification. There are also positive factors including enabling global conventions and coalitions and African initiatives to establish transnational businesses, add value to community initiatives, take advantage of technologies and mobilize the strength of Africans around the globe.

== PANAFEST and the Ghanaian State ==
PANAFEST is an international event that, as has happened since Independence in the mid-20th century, makes Ghana a motivational force for African peoples. Since 1992, the festival has attracted participation by official delegations, individuals and groups from African, Caribbean and South American countries, as well as groups and individuals from Europe and the United States. The government of Ghana considers this a major national initiative and appreciates the agencies, communities, civil society organizations and corporate bodies which have mobilized resources to complement government efforts over the years. The government of Ghana is also deeply appreciative of all sister governments for their participation and the African Union for lending its auspices to this unique cultural manifestation.
