= Tema East =

Constituency in Ghana

- constituency for the Parliament of Ghana
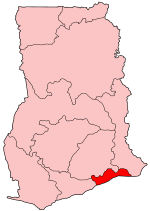
- District: Tema Municipal District
- Region: Greater Accra Region of Ghana

Current constituency
- Party: National Democratic Congress
- MP: Isaac Ashai Odamtten

Tema East is one of the constituencies represented in the Parliament of Ghana. It elects one Member of Parliament (MP) by the first past the post system of election. Isaac Ashai Odamtten is the member of parliament for the constituency. Tema East is located in the Tema Municipal District of the Greater Accra Region of Ghana.

== Boundaries ==
The constituency is located within the Accra Metropolis District of the Greater Accra Region of Ghana. It consists of Tema Newtown and Community one

== Members of Parliament ==
Election	Member	Party
1992	Erasmus Aruna Quao	National Convention Party
1996	Ishmael Ashietey	New Patriotic Party
2008	Samuel Evans Ashong Narh	New Patriotic Party
2016	Daniel Nii Kwartei Titus Glover	New Patriotic Party

== Elections ==
MPs elected in the Ghanaian parliamentary election, 2008:Tema East Source: Ghana Home Page
Party	Candidate	Votes	%	±%
New Patriotic Party	Samuel Evans Ashong Narh	40,444	49.4	—
National Democratic Congress	Robert Kenyes Ofosuware	33,011	40.3	—
Convention People's Party	Richster Nii Armah Armarfio	7,852	9.6	—
Independent	Nii Sai Annan	519	0.6	
Democratic People's Party	Stephen Ashitey Adjei	0	0.0	—
Majority		17,433	9.1	—
Turnout		—	—	—

2016 Ghanaian general election : Tema East Source:Peacefmonline
Party	Candidates	Votes	%
NPP	DANIEL NII KWARTEI TITUS-GLOVER	31,782	52.82
NDC	ROBERT KEMPES OFOSUWARE	27,757	46.13
IND	THEOPHILUS NII ANKAMAH DENSU-TETTEH	408	0.68
CPP	RICHMOND LAWER MENSAH	229	0.38

== See also ==
- List of Ghana Parliament constituencies
