= University of Cape Coast =

Public university in Ghana

- Arms of the University of Cape Coast
- Motto: Latin: Veritas Nobis Lumen
- Motto in English: "Truth, Our Guide"
- Type: Public
- Established: 1962; 64 years ago
- Affiliations: See below
- Chairman: William Atuguba
- Chancellor: Sam E. Jonah, ACSM, KBE
- Vice-Chancellor: Denis Worlanyo Aheto
- Undergraduates: Over 70,000 students national and internationally
- Postgraduates: Over 10,000
- Location: Cape Coast, Central Region, Ghana; 5.115788°N 1.290810°W
- Campus: Suburban area
- Colours: Cosmic Cobalt, White, Aureolin and Vermilion
- Nickname: Cape Vars
- Website: ucc.edu.gh
- Ranked by Times Higher Education as the Best University in Ghana.

The Great Casely Hayford Hall

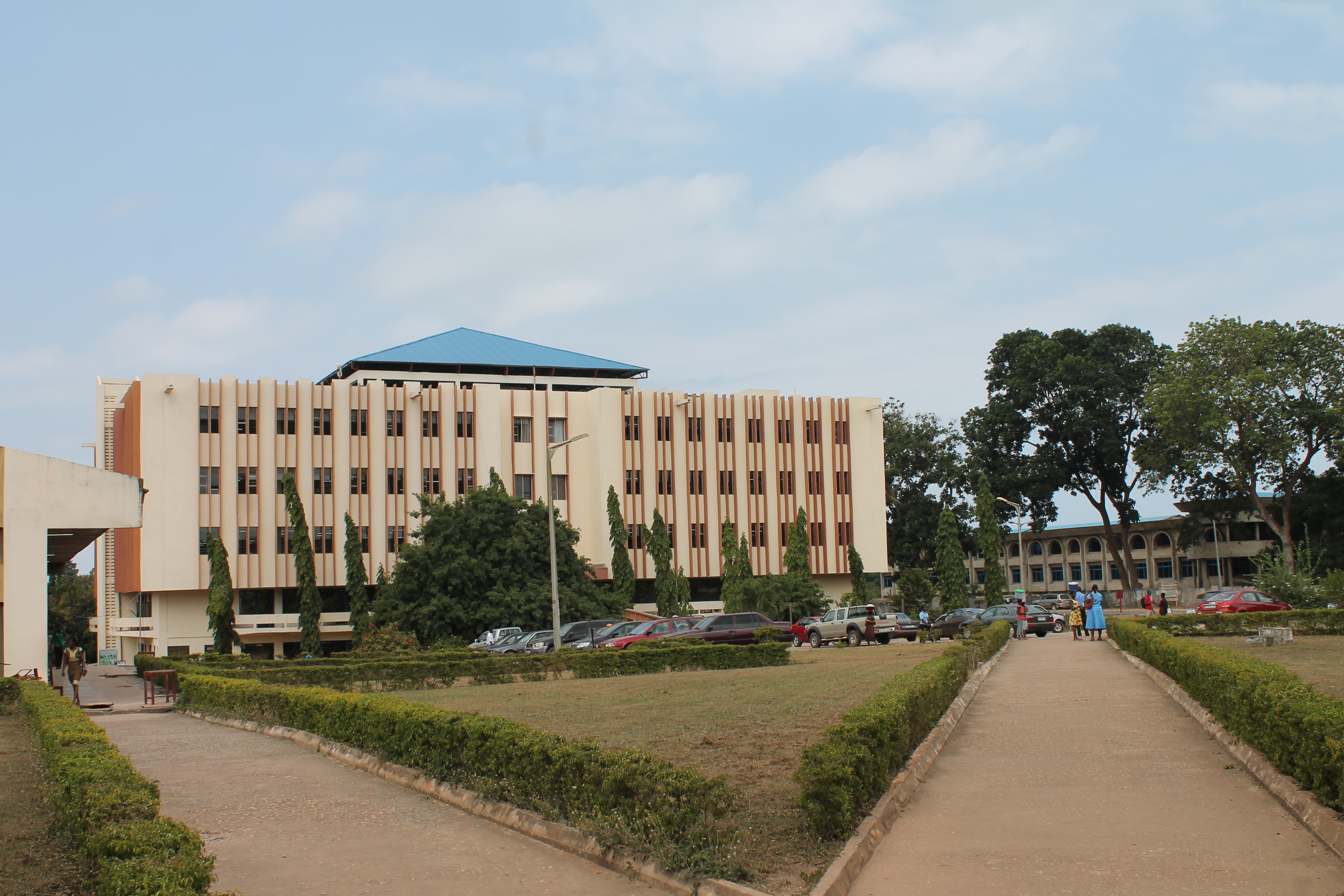
Sam Jonah Library

The University of Cape Coast (UCC) is a public collegiate university located in the historic town of Cape Coast in the central region of Ghana. The campus has a rare seafront view and sits on a hill overlooking the Atlantic Ocean. It operates on two campuses: the Southern Campus (Old Site) and the Northern Campus (New Site). Two of the most important historical sites in Ghana, Elmina and Cape Coast Castle, are a few kilometres away from its campus.

The University of Cape Coast was established in October 1962 as a university college in response to the country's dire need for highly qualified and skilled manpower in the education sector. Its original mandate was therefore to train graduate teachers for second cycle institutions, teacher training colleges and technical institutions, a mission that the two existing public universities at the time were unequipped to fulfil.

In 1972, the college attained the status of a full and independent university, with the authority to confer its own degrees, diplomas and certificates by an Act of Parliament. Today, with the expansion of some of its faculties/schools and the diversification of programmes, the university has the capacity to meet the manpower needs of other ministries and industries in the country, besides that of the Ministry of Education. The university has since added to its functions the training of doctors and health care professionals, business professionals, administrators, legal professionals, and agriculturalists such as agricultural extension agents. UCC graduates include Ministers of State, High Commissioners, CEOs, Members of Parliament, and Ghana's first female vice president.

== History ==
The University of Cape Coast was established in October 1962 as a university college and placed in a special relationship with the University of Ghana, Legon. On 1 October 1971, the college attained the status of a full and independent University, with the authority to confer its own degrees, diplomas and certificates by an Act of Parliament.

The university was established out of a dire need for highly qualified and skilled manpower in education. Its original mandate was, therefore, to train graduate professional teachers for Ghana's second cycle institutions and the Ministry of Education in order to meet the manpower needs of the country's accelerated education programme at the time.

Today, with the expansion of some of its Faculties/Schools and the diversification of programmes, the university has the capacity to meet the manpower needs of other ministries and industries in the country, besides that of the Ministry of Education. From an initial student enrollment of 155 in 1963, the University of Cape Coast now has a total student population of about 80,000.

The university started with two departments, namely: Arts and Science. These departments developed into Faculties in 1963. In order to achieve the set objectives, in 1964, the university created two more Faculties, namely: Education and Economics & Social Studies [now Faculty of Social Sciences]. The fifth faculty [School of Agriculture] was established in 1975. The Faculty of Science was split into the Schools of Physical and Biological Sciences during the 2002←/2003 academic year while the Department of Business Studies was also elevated to the School of Business with effect from the 2003/2004 academic year. The Medical School and faculty of Law among others have been added.

The university now trains doctors and health care professionals, as well as education planners, administrators, agriculturalists, Accountants, lawyers etc. The University of Cape Coast (UCC) graduates include Ministers of State, High Commissioners, CEO's, and Members of Parliament.

== Campuses ==
UCC has a satellite campus at Agona Nyakrom.

=== Old Site Campus ===
The Old Site Campus also known as the Southern Campus is located on high grounds, above the sea level, within the Apewosika and Kokoado communities in the Cape Coast metropolis. The strategic setting of the Old Site Campus within these two communities had increased socio-economic activities.

The Campus houses the university's Old Central Administration, the only female hall of residence, the Adehye Hall, the Atlantic Hall, Oguaa Hall, and University Hospital, which provides quality health service to the student population and the general public is located in here. The Department of Vocational and Technical Educational (VOTEC) is located at the old site campus.

=== New Site Campus ===
New Site Campus or Northern Campus, popularly known as "Science" is within a kilometer distance from Old Site is located near the Kwaprow and Amamoma communities. The Northern Campus came into being as a result of the growing number of students admitted into the university.

The Campus houses the only male hall of the university, Casley Hayford Hall. While other halls with both girls and boys include Kwame Nkrumah Hall, Valco Hall. there is also a Campus Broadcasting Center. It is the location of the Science Complex Building therefore the popular name "Science".

University Garden and the University Zoo are also located in the New Site Campus of the university.

== Student population ==
From an initial student enrolment of 155 in 1963, the University of Cape Coast now has a total student population of 74,720. The breakdown is as follows: 18,949 regular undergraduate students, 1445 sandwich undergraduate students, 1014 regular postgraduate students, 2773 sandwich postgraduate students, 48,989 distance undergraduate students, and 1540 postgraduate distance students. The university admitted a total of 24,723 students into its various programs for the 2016/2017 academic year.

From 2016/2017 academic year till date, the population of the university keeps on increasing each year. Currently, the school has a student population of 78,485 with 41,165 (52.40%) male and 37,320 (47.60%) female student population, which in total is exactly 2,765 more than what they had in the 2016/2017 academic year. The breakdown of the student population in the 2022/2023 academic year is as follows: there have 9 sandwich students who are the only ones offering certificate in their various programs with 2 of them being males and 7 females. 11,539 diploma offering students with 11,234 being distance students (5,271 males and 5,963 females) and 305 sandwich students (132 males and 173 females). 60,406 undergraduates which entails of 23,537 regular students (13,072 males and 10,465 females), 16,260 distance students (8,324 males and 7,936 females), 1,241 sandwich students (561 males and 686 females) and 19,362 IOE sandwich students (9,937 males and 9,425 females). The population consists of 578 PhD students who are all regular students, with 372 males and 206 females. 305 PGDE students consisting of 71 distance students (29 males and 42 females) and 234 sandwich students (148 males and 86 females). 5,648 students doing their masters currently with 1,148 students being regular students (709 males and 439 females), 2,239 distance students (1,287 males and 952 females) and 2,261 sandwich students (1,321 males and 940 females).

== Governance system ==
The University of Cape Coast is currently governed by a Council made of elected members from the university community and State appointees.

=== Members of Council ===
The governing body is known as the University Council and they consist of a Chairperson/Pro-Chancellor, Representative of Post-Graduate Students, Vice-Chancellor, three (3) Government Nominees, two (2) Representatives of Convocation, Representative of UTAG - UCC Branch, Representative of CHASS, Representative of TEWU of TUC, Representative of Alumni Association, Representative of Undergraduate Students, Representative of Post-Graduate Students, Representative of GTEC, Registrar, Pro-Vice Chancellor, Director of Finance and Council Secretariat, Office of the Registrar.

=== Principal officers ===
According to the statues of the university, principal officers of the university include the chancellor, pro-chancellor/chairperson, Vice-Chancellor, registrar and pro-vice-chancellor.

The list of past and current Principals/Vice-Chancellor of UCC
Name of Principal or Vice-Chancellor	Position	Duration of tenure
Dr C. A. Ackah	Principal	1962 to 1964
Dr N. G. Bakhoom	Principal	1964 to 1966
Dr C. A. Ackah	Principal	1966 to 1968
Prof. K. A. Nyarko	Acting Principal	1968 to 1969
Prof. E. A. Boateng	Principal	1969 to 1972
Prof. E. A. Boateng	Vice-Chancellor	1972 to 1973
Prof. Yanney-Ewusie	Vice-Chancellor	1973 to 1978
Prof. S. K. Odamtten	Acting Vice-Chancellor	1978 to 1980
Prof. K. B. Dickson	Vice-Chancellor	1980 to 1988
Prof. K. N. Eyeson	Acting Vice-Chancellor	1988 to 1989
Prof. K. B. Dickson	Vice-Chancellor	1989 to 1990
Prof. Austin Tetteh Prof. R. K. G. Assoku Prof. Martha Tamakloe	Interim Administrative Council	1990 to 1991
Rev. Prof. S. K. Adjepong	Vice-Chancellor	1991 to 2001
Rev. Prof. Emmanuel Addow-Obeng	Vice-Chancellor	2001 to 2008
Prof. Naana Jane Opoku-Agyemang	Vice-Chancellor	2008 to 2012
Prof. D. D. Kuupole	Vice-Chancellor	2012 to 2016
Rev. Prof. Joseph Ghartey-Ampiah	Vice-Chancellor	2016 to 2020
Prof. Johnson Nyarko Boampong	Vice-Chancellor	2020 to 2025
Prof. Denis Worlanyo Aheto	Vice-Chancellor	2025 to date

== Academics ==
The University of Cape Coast is today organized into six colleges. Each college has different faculties, schools and departments under them as elaborated below;

=== College of Agriculture & Natural Sciences ===
==== School of Physical Sciences ====
- Department of Physics
- Department of Mathematics
- Department of Statistics
- Department of Laboratory Technology
- Department of Computer Science & Information Technology
- Department of Chemistry
- Laser & Fibre Optics Centre
- Industrial Chemistry Programme

==== School of Biological Sciences ====
- Department of Molecular Biology and Biotechnology
- Department of Fisheries & Aquatic Sciences
- Department of Environmental Sciences
- Department of Entomology & Wildlife
- Department of Forensic Sciences
- Department of Biochemistry

==== School of Agriculture ====
- Department of Soil Science
- Department of Crop Science
- Department of Animal Science
- Department of Agricultural Engineering
- Department of Agricultural Economics and Extension
- Technology Village
- Supervise Enterprise Projects (SEPs)
- Meat Processing Unit (MPU)

=== College of Distance Education ===
- Department of Business studies
- Department of Education
- Department of Mathematics and Science

=== College of Education Studies ===
==== Faculty of Educational Foundations ====
- Centre for Child Development Research and Referral
- Counselling Centre
- Department of Basic Education
- Department of Education & Psychology
- Department of Guidance and Counseling

==== Faculty of Humanities & Social Sciences Education ====
- Department of Arts Education
- Department of Business and Social Sciences Education

==== Faculty of Science & Technology Education ====
- Department of Health Science Education
- Department of Health, Physical Education & Recreation
- Department of Mathematics & ICT Education
- Department of Science Education
- Department of Vocational & Technical Education

==== School of Educational Development & Outreach ====
- Centre for Educational Research, Evaluation and Development
- Centre for Teacher Professional Development
- Centre for Teaching Support
- Institute of Education

=== College of Humanities and Legal Studies ===
==== Faculty of Social Sciences ====
- Institute for Oil and Gas Studies
- School for Development Studies (IDS)
- Department of Sociology & Anthropology
- Department of Population & Health
- Department of Hospitality & Tourism Management
- Department of Geography & Regional Planning
- Department of Economics
- Centre for Gender, Research, Advocacy and Documentation (CEGRAD)
- Micro-finance Unit
- Centre for Data Archiving, Management, Analysis and Advocacy (C-DAMAA)

==== Faculty of Arts ====
- Information & Literacy Skills
- Department of Theatre & Film Studies
- Department of Religion and Human Values
- Department of Music & Dance
- Department of History
- Department of Ghanaian Languages & Linguistics
- Department of French
- Department of English
- Department of Communication Studies
- Department of Classics & Philosophy
- Centre for African and International Studies

==== Faculty of Law ====
- Department of Law
- Law Clinic & Department for Legal Extension
- Centre for Legal Research
- Law Library & Information Centre

==== School of Business ====
- Department of Management
- Department of Accounting
- Department of Finance
- Department of Marketing & Supply Chain Management
- Department of Human Resource Management
- Professional & Management Development Unit (PMDU)
- Centre for Entrepreneurship and Small Enterprise Development (CESED)

=== College of Health & Allied Sciences ===
School of Pharmacy and Pharmaceutical Sciences

• Department of Pharmaceutical Chemistry

• Department of microbiology

• Department of Pharmaceutics

• Department of Pharmacotherapeutics and Pharmacy Practice

• Department of Pharmacognosy and Herbal Medicine

==== School of Medical Sciences ====
- Department of Nurse Anaesthesia
- Department of Anaesthesia & Pain Management
- Department of Anatomy & Cell Biology
- Department of Medical Biochemistry & Molecular Biology
- Department of Obstetrics & Gynaecology & Fetal Medicine
- Department of Internal Medicine & Therapeutics
- Department of Chemical Pathology
- Department of Community Medicine
- Department of Internal Medicine & Therapeutics
- Department of Medical Education & Information Technology
- Department of Microbiology & Immunology
- Department of Pharmacology
- Department of Paediatrics
- Department of Morbid Anatomy & Histopathology
- Department of Surgery
- Department of Psychological Medicine & Mental Health
- Department of Physiology

==== School of Nursing & Midwifery ====
- Department of Adult Health
- Department of Mental Health
- Department of Maternal and Child Health
- Department of Public Health

==== School of Allied Health Sciences ====
- Department of Sports Science
- Department of Biomedical Sciences
- Department of Physician Assistant Studies
- Department of Nutrition and Dietetics
- Department of Medical Laboratory Technology
- Department of Medical Imaging
- Department of Health Information Management
- Department of Optometry

=== School of Graduate Studies and Research ===
The School of Graduate Studies (SGS) of the University of Cape Coast came into being on 1 August 2008. It began as a Committee on Higher Degrees, with a mandate to advise Senate on the university's graduate policy and recommend the award of scholarship for approval. In 1992, the Committee on Higher Degrees was transformed to a Board of Graduate Studies. This Board, a sub-committee of Academic Board was entrusted with responsibility for administering graduate education in the university, until its status was elevated to a school on 1 August 2008. The school has the mandate to co-ordinate graduate-level academic programmes for all colleges within the university. It also regulates and offers advice on graduate programmes of university colleges affiliated to the University of Cape Coast.

To achieve its vision and mission, the school has four-fold functions:

1. Draft regulations for all higher degrees with a view to ensuring that acceptable academic standards are maintained.
2. Receive reports and consider recommendations pertaining to higher degrees and graduate diplomas from Departmental and Faculty Committee of Graduate Studies.
3. Determine the results of higher degrees and graduate diplomas.
4. Make recommendations to the Academic Board for the award of higher degrees and graduate diplomas.

The university operates a two-semester system for its regular graduate programmes. The First Semester begins from August to December and Second Semester from January to May. The university awards Master of Arts (M.A.), Master of Science (MSc), Master of Education (MEd), Master of Business Administration (M.B.A.), Master of Philosophy (M.Phil.), Master of Commerce (M.Com.) and Doctor of Philosophy (PhD) degrees in the various disciplines.

M.A./MEd/MSc programmes will normally consist of two semesters of course work (nine months) followed by a project or dissertation (three months).

The Master of Philosophy (M.Phil.) programme will normally consist of two parts. Part I shall consist of two semesters of course work for full-time students and four semesters of course work for part-time students. Part II extends over 12 months and is for research and presentation of the thesis. The Doctor of Philosophy (PhD) programme is essentially by research. The duration is between 3 and 4 years for full-time students and 4 and 5 years for part-time students.

== Office of International Relations ==
The Office of International Relation (OIR), University of Cape Coast, formerly Center for International Education (CIE) was established to promote, support and coordinate all facets of international education activities in the university. These activities include international students and staff exchanges, research collaborations and publications, and information sharing, all aimed at enhancing the international image of the university.

Over the years, the centre had fostered links with institutions of higher learning from the US, China, UK, Sweden, Germany, Liberia, Nigeria and Senegal, among others.

The centre offers specialized support services for inbound and outbound exchange students and staff on issues including, but not exclusive to, orientation, admission, enrollment, accommodation, pastoral care, pre-departure briefings and post-return debriefings for inbound and outbound exchange students and staff.

FUNCTIONS

The centre:

1. Manages all matters and programmes relating to international education.
2. Serves as an advisory unit to all academic departments on exchanges and collaborations.
3. Serves as a service provider on campus to all international and visiting students, faculty members and staff.
4. Is responsible for the development of Memorandum of Understanding or partnership agreements with institutions in and outside Ghana.
5. Facilitates the exchange of staff, faculty and students of partner institutions and vice versa.
6. Organizes international workshops, seminars and conferences.

The University of Cape Coast runs an international student exchange programme with participants from Europe, North America, and other African countries. International students are fully integrated into student and campus life and receive full credit on successful completion of their studies at UCC.

== Affiliated institutions ==
All Colleges of Education in Ghana

- Pentecost University College
- Christian Service University College
- Palm Institute
- Synergies Institute-Ghana
- Fountainhead Christian College
- Institute for Development and Technology Management
- Institute for Security, Disaster and Emergency Studies (ISDES)
- Klintaps University College
- Nana Afia Kobi Serwaa Ampem II Nursing Training College
- Nduom School of Business and Technology
- College of Health and Well-Being
- College of Health, Yamfo

== Halls of Residence ==
- Oguaa Hall
- Atlantic Hall (ATL)
- Casely Hayford Hall (Casford)

The Great Casely Hayford Hall

- Adehye Hall
- Kwame Nkrumah Hall
- Valco Hall
- SRC Hall
- Supernuation hall
- Alumni Hall
- Valco Trust Hall (Graduate Hall)
- PSI Hall

== Rankings and reputation ==
University rankings

Global – Overall
- THE World: 601–800 (2024)

Regional – Overall
- THE Africa: =7 (2024)

National – Overall
- THE National: 1 (2024)

In September 2021, the University of Cape Coast was ranked by Times Higher Education 2022 World University Rankings as follows:

- The No. 1 University in Africa for research influence (Globally)
- The No. 1 University in Ghana
- The No. 1 University in West Africa
- Ranked amongst the top 5 Universities in Africa.

In October 2022, the university was again ranked the best in Ghana and West Africa. The 4th best in Africa and 24th in the world universities.

In July 2023, the university is still ranked as the best university in Ghana and 4th in Africa according to Times Higher Education Rankings.

== Notable alumni ==
- Edmund Abaka, photographer and professor of African history at the University of Miami
- Rosina Acheampong, Ghanaian educationist and former headmistress of Wesley Girls High School
- Alfred P. Addaquay, Ghanaian classical keyboardist, composer, arranger, conductor, choral director and singer
- Emmanuel Addow-Obeng, Ghanaian academic, administrator and cleric. He was the Vice-Chancellor of the University of Cape Coast and served as the Pro-Vice-Chancellor of the Central University of Ghana
- Mercy Catherine Adjabeng, author, magazine editor-in-chief and managing editor
- Mustapha Abdul-Hamid, Former CEO of the National Petroleum Authority
- Jane Naana Opoku Agyemang, former Minister of Education of the Republic of Ghana, first female Vice Chancellor of a public university in Ghana, first female vice presidential candidate for the National Democratic Congress, the largest opposition political party in Ghana
- Kofi Akpabli, Ghanaian journalist, writer, and publisher
- Kofi Totobi Quakyi, Minister for Information from 1985 - 1993
- Kwesi Ahwoi, Ghana's High Commissioner to South Africa and Ghana's former Minister of Interior
- Kwabena Mintah Akandoh, member of Parliament for the Juaboso Constituency in the Western North Region and the Minister of Health
- Aba Andam, Ghanaian particle physicist
- Samuel Kobina Annim, government statistician and former associate professor of economics
- Yaw Ansong Jnr, physician-scientist, inventor, and entrepreneur
- Juliet Asante, award-winning filmmaker, entrepreneur, activist, Huffington Post blogger, Aspen Global Leadership fellow, Legatum Institute fellow, alumnus of the Fortune 500/State Department Mentorship program, and Vital Voices Global leaders forum
- Kojo Armah, Ghanaian lawyer, diplomat, and former member of parliament
- Frank Albert Odoom, former Director General of Social Security and National Insurance Trust (SSNIT)
- George Aryee, former director general of the Ghana Broadcasting Corporation
- Kweku Asiamah, Minister of Transport
- Barbara Asher Ayisi, Ghanaian politician, educationist, and Deputy Minister of Education
- Michael Okyere Baafi, a Ghanaian politician, member of parliament, former Deputy Minister of Trade and Industry, and executive secretary of Ghana Free Zones Board
- Emmanuel Kwasi Bandua, Ghanaian lawyer, politician, and member of parliament
- Janepare Bartels-Kodwo, Justice of the Supreme Court of Ghana (2025–)
- Ama Afo Blay, former director-general of the Ghana Education Service
- Johnson Nyarko Boampong, Ghanaian pharmacist, biomedical scientist, and current vice chancellor of the University of Cape Coast
- Rosemond Aboagyewa Boohene, Ghanaian accountant, entrepreneurship scholar, and current pro vice chancellor of the University of Cape Coast
- Richard Damoah, Ghanaian physicist and research scientist at NASA's Goddard Space Flight Center
- Doris Dartey, former Ghanaian communication educator, consultant, and onetime member and chairperson of GJA Awards Committee
- Nana Amba Eyiaba I, Ghanaian traditional ruler (Queen-mother), educationist and former member of the Electoral Commission of Ghana
- Dora Francisca Edu-Buandoh, current pro vice-chancellor and professor of English at the University of Cape Coast
- Anthont Forson Jnr., Justice of the Supreme Court of Ghana (2026–)
- Nana Klutse, Ghanaian climate scientist
- Nii Kwartei Titus Glover, Member of Parliament for the Tema East constituency and the Deputy Minister of Transport in Ghana
- Millison Narh, Deputy Governor of the Bank of Ghana
- Abdul-Rashid Pelpuo, Member of Parliament and Minister of State for Private Public Partnership
- Yvonne Nduom, a Ghanaian public figure known chiefly as the wife of the leader of the Progressive People's Party and is currently the Executive Chairperson of Coconut Grove Hotels
- Kojo Oppong Nkrumah, a Ghanaian politician, lawyer, member of parliament and the Minister of Information in the administration of Nana Akufo-Addo
- Eric Oduro Osae, a Ghanaian local governance expert, lawyer and chartered accountant who serves as the Director General of the Internal Audit Agency of Ghana.
- William Quaitoo, a Ghanaian politician, and former Deputy Minister of Agriculture
- Kwabena Sarpong-Anane, acting Director General of the Ghana Broadcasting Corporation (2010–2011)
- Seth Terkper, former Minister of Finance, MOFEP (2012–2016)
- Joseph Whittal, a Ghanaian who has been the Commissioner of Human Rights and Administrative Justice of Ghana since December 2016
- Daniel A. Wubah, President, Millersville University of Pennsylvania, USA
- Malik Al-Hassan Yakubu, a former Speaker of Parliament, a former Minister of Interior and a former member of parliament
- Mohammed-Sani Abdulai, a Ghanaian educator and IT specialist

== Gallery ==
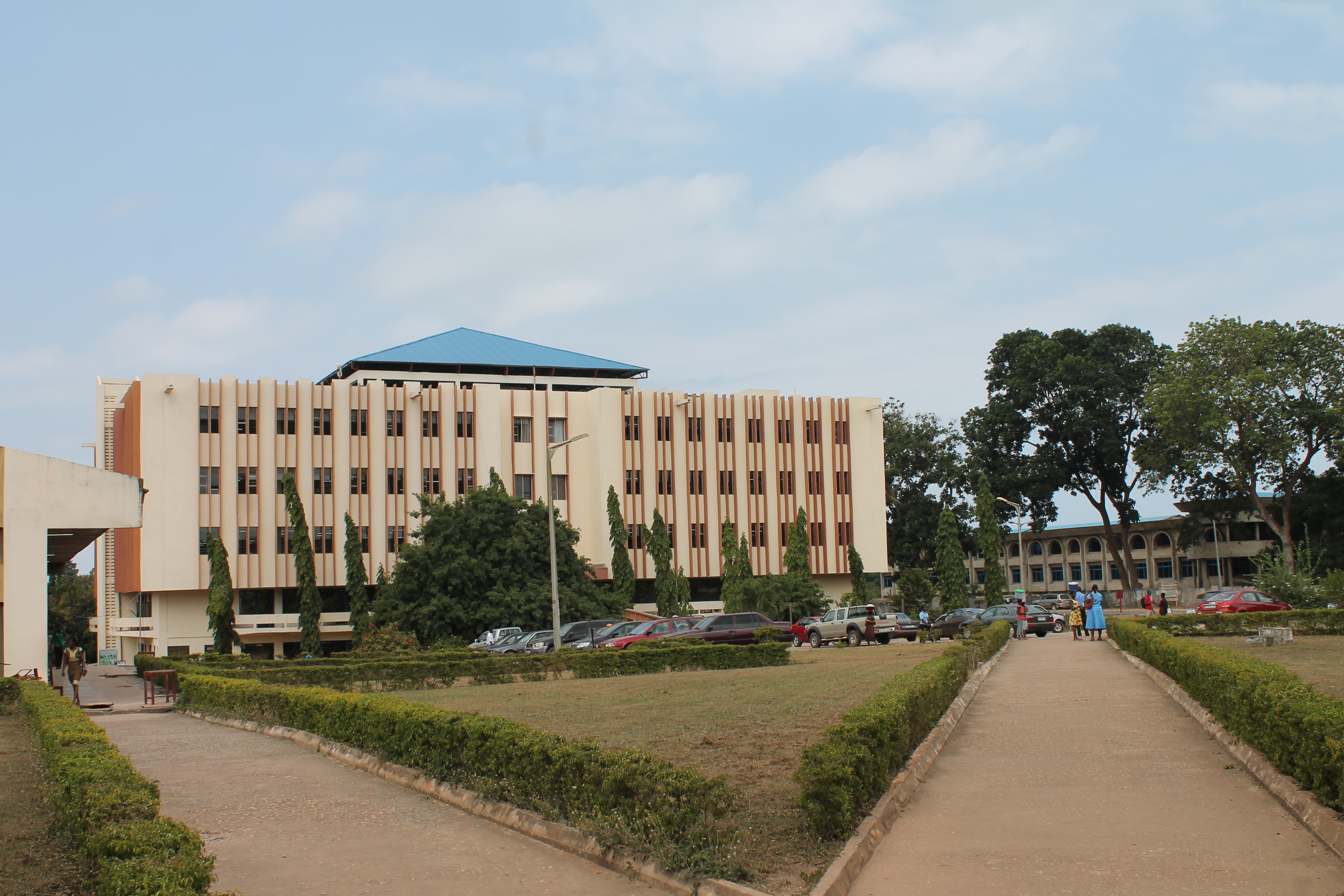
Sam Jonah Library

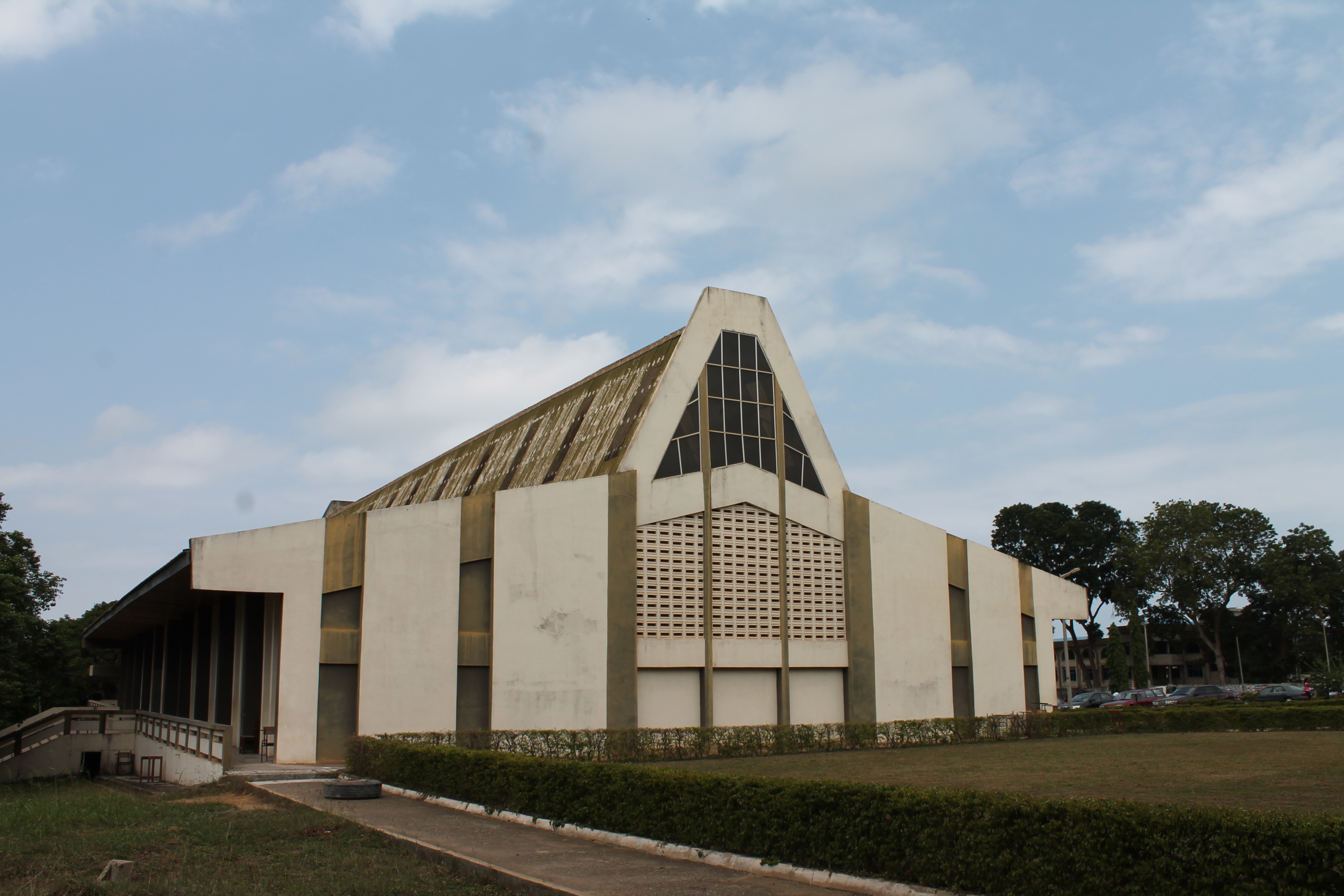
Large Lecture Theatre

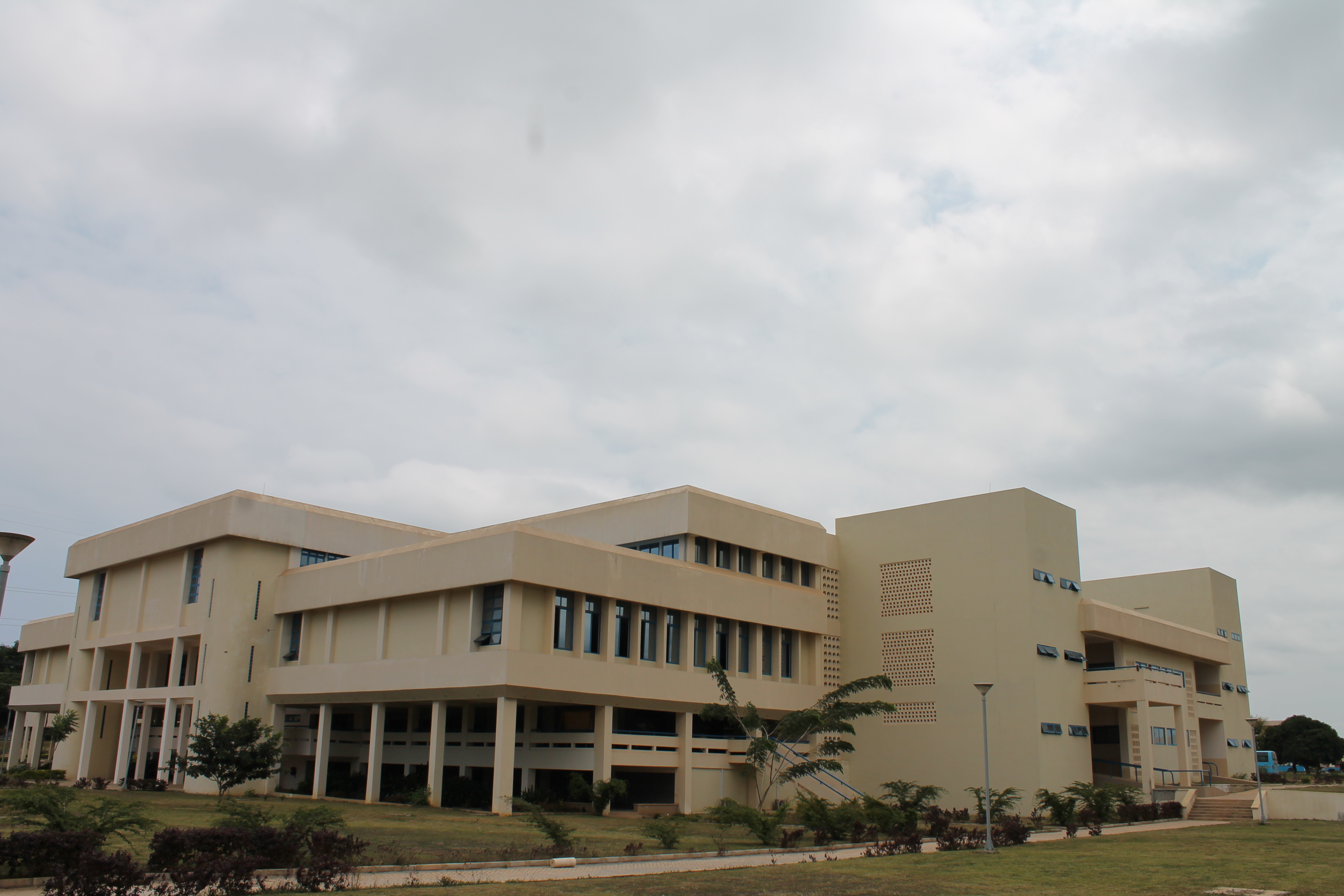
Faculty of Education Lecture Theatre

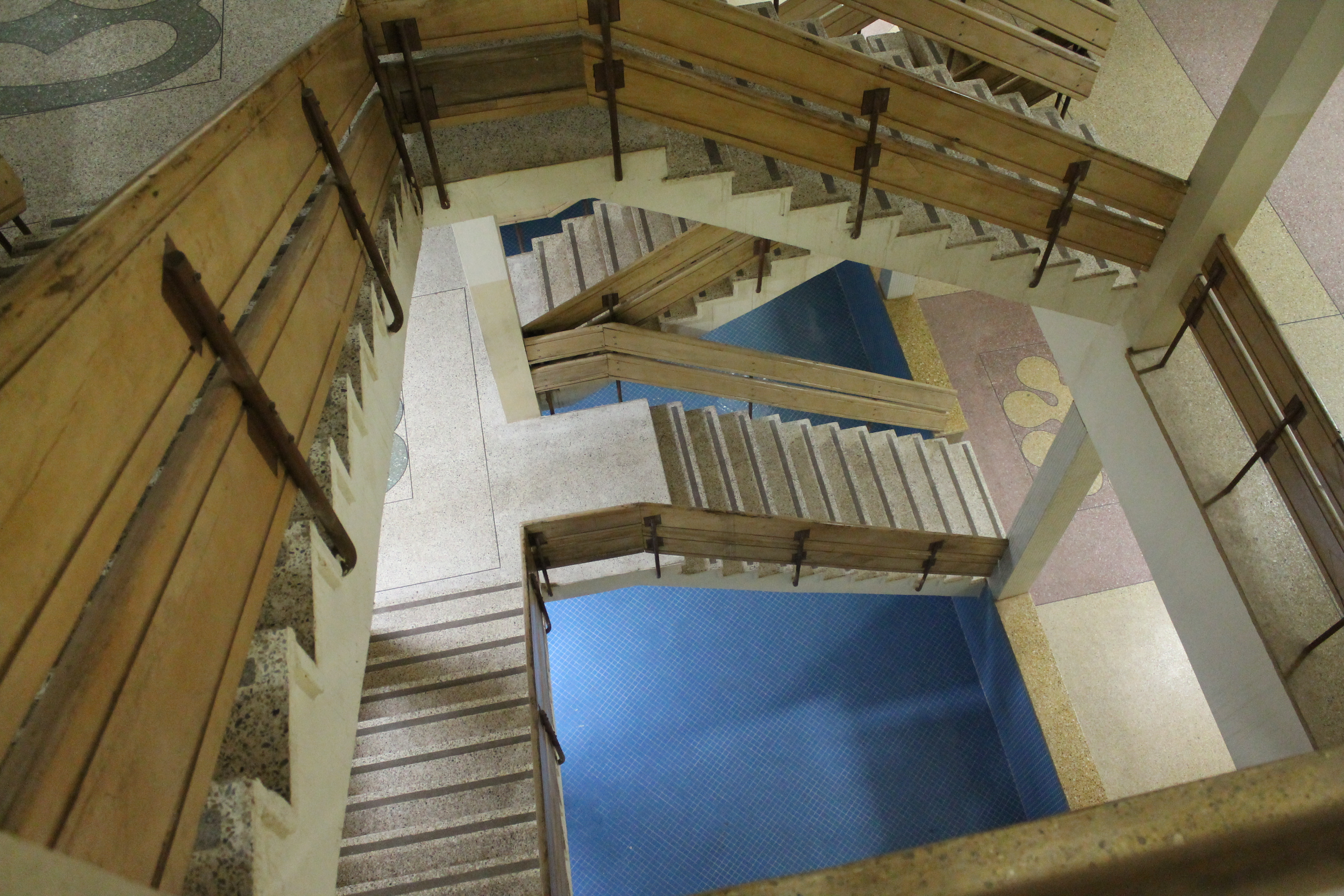
Faculty of Education Lecture Theatre

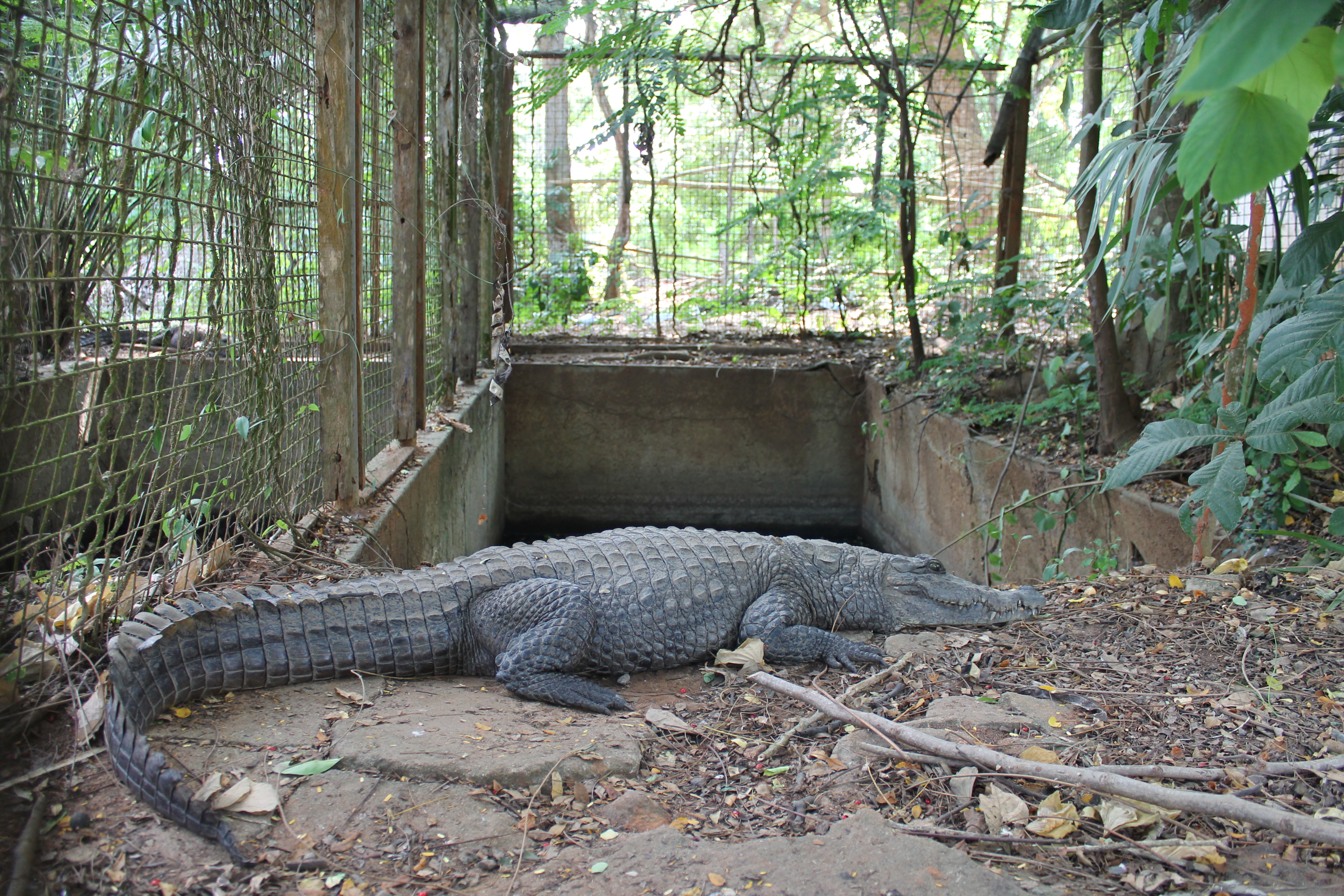
Crocodile at the Zoo

== See also ==
- List of universities in Ghana
- Sam E. Jonah, Chancellor of the university
- Prof. Johnson Nyarko Boampong, Vice-Chancellor of the university
- University of Education, Winneba.
