= LoveRealm =

- Website type: Social Networking
- Available in: English
- Headquarters: Accra, {{{location_country}}}
- Area served: Worldwide
- Founders: Yaw Ansong Sr.; Yaw Ansong Jr.
- Industry: Internet
- Website: www.loverealm.com
- Registration: Required
- Launched: January 9, 2016; 10 years ago
- Current status: Open Beta

LoveRealm is a Christian social networking platform. It was founded by two brothers and medical doctors Yaw Ansong Jr. and Yaw Ansong Sr. The company originates from Accra, Ghana, and has employees from Europe and the US. The social network entered beta in 2016.

The website has systems in place such as a mentorship system where users are assigned to mentors whose role is to guide and assist them in personal growth. Additionally, users can post their problems and share “prayer requests” to other members.

== History ==
LoveRealm was started by the brothers after Yaw Ansong Jr. came to believe there was a need for a Christian online network where individuals could support each other and share their beliefs in a protected space.

"I was at a point in my life where I was at my lowest, and I realized that I had struggles and weaknesses and all this started when I found myself in an environment outside my country where there were not many Christians. I thought, If Christians could connect to each other wherever they are and have a platform where they could encourage each other, then it could go a long way to help them," said Dr. Ansong to Deutsche Welle.

The pre-launch ceremony of the social network website was held at the Pentecost Convention Centre during the Pentecost Students Association (PENSA) conference on 9 January 2016. At the pre-launch ceremony, the founders collected feedback from randomly selected test users before releasing the website to the public. After the initial target of a few hundred test users, the website experienced technical difficulties as a result of unexpectedly high traffic. Later the issue was fixed by adding space for 2000 more initial users.

On 30 August 2016, the company launched a mobile version of their website for Android users on the Google Play Store.

Shortly after the mobile app launch, the platform reached over 20,000 users. Eight months after opening access to the public, the platform reached 50,000 users.

== Controversies ==
On 4 January 2016, BBC published a story explaining that Ghana was to get a sin-free alternative to Facebook. LoveRealm responded by saying that the network was providing a spiritual social network experience for Christians and not to build a salem of righteous people.

The platform censors users by removing content it deems "un-Christian", such as nudity or violence using its built-in monitoring algorithm.
