= Johnson Nyarko Boampong =

Ghanaian pharmacist

Johnson Nyarko Boampong is a Ghanaian pharmacist, biomedical Scientist, professor and was the Vice-Chancellor of the University of Cape Coast.

== Education ==
Prof. Boampong has a B.Pharm. degree from the Kwame Nkrumah University of Science and Technology (1997-2001) and, B.Sc. degree and Dip. Ed (1988-1992) from the University of Cape Coast. He also obtained his M.Phil. degree in zoology (Applied Parasitology) from the University of Ghana (1995-1999). He is a product of Tokyo Women's Medical University, Japan, where he obtained his PhD in Tropical Medicine (2004-2007) as a Japan International Corporation Agency (JICA) scholar. He did his post-doctorate research at the Postgraduate Institute of Medical Education and Research (PGIMER), Chandigarh, India as CV Raman Scholar (2011). He has taken many other professional courses abroad and has presented his research findings at different international conferences. He is a member of many international and local professional associations.

== Career ==
Prof. Johnson Nyarko Boampong is a pharmacist and biomedical Scientist. He became Provost of the College of Health and Allied Sciences after completing his three-year term as the Dean of School of Biological Sciences, all in the University of Cape Coast, Ghana. He headed the Department of Biomedical and Forensic Sciences for five years prior to becoming the Dean. He led the department to establish the following programmes; Certificate in Herbal Medicine, B.Sc. Biomedical Sciences, B.Sc. Forensic Sciences and, MPhil and PhD in Drug Discovery and Toxicology. He also promoted the establishment of functional Laboratory to advance research in the School of Biological Sciences. As Dean, he ensured the renovation and refurbishment of other laboratories, planting of new seedlings in the Botanic garden and enhanced International collaborations. As Provost, he championed the establishment of the School of Pharmacy and Pharmaceutical Sciences which runs a Doctor of Pharmacy (Pharm.D) Programme.

Prof. Boampong has taught parasitology, and supervised undergraduate and postgraduate (M.Phil. and PhD) students with diverse backgrounds. Some of the students he trained have been appointed as lecturers in universities in Ghana and elsewhere. He has mentored many lecturers. He is also an external examiner to other universities in Ghana.

As private pharmacy practitioner he established Biomeid Pharmacia, a community pharmacy that provides pharmaceutical services to the university community at the University of Cape Coast. He is the proprietor of Creative Academy situated at Mpeasem, a suburb of Cape Coast.

== Research ==
Prof Boampong's research interests cover multidisciplinary areas, a reflection of his diverse professional training in the area of Biomedical Sciences and Pharmacy. These include parasitic diseases, drug resistant parasites, drug discovery and targeted drug delivery. He has more than fifty publications in peer-reviewed Journals. He is a fellow and also a member of Academic Board of the Ghana College of Pharmacists.

== Personal life ==
He is married to Georgina Thompson with whom he has four children, two boys and two girls.

== Awards ==
Professor Johnson Nyarko Boampong has won numerous awards including the C.V Raman Fellowship for African Scientists, Postdoctoral Fellowship, he was awarded a Japan International Corporation Agency to pursue a PhD at Tokyo Women's Medical University, Japan in 2003. He was also the runner up for the Best Teacher Award in the Ashanti Region in 2001.
