= Dora Francisca Edu-Buandoh =

Ghanaian English professor

Francisca Dora Edu-Buandoh is a Ghanaian professor of English and the first female Pro Vice-Chancellor of the University of Cape Coast. Her appointment was made at the 99th Governing Council Meeting of UCC that was held on 23 November 2018. She took over from Prof. George K.T Oduro whose term of office expired on 13 December 2018. In October 2025, she was commissioned as Ghana's ambassador to Canada.

== Education ==
Professor Dora Edu-Buandoh holds a PhD from the University of Iowa, USA; MPhil and Bachelor's degrees in English from the University of Cape Coast and a Certificate in Teaching English to Speakers of Other Languages (TESOL) from the University of Wisconsin, Madison, USA. She is also a qualified teacher, having passed out with a Certificate 'A' from Komenda Training College, and a Diploma in Education from University of Cape Coast. She was a participant in a DAAD sponsored International Deans Course for Higher Education Management and has taken the Galilee International Management Institute Diploma in Higher Education Management programme.

== Career ==
She is currently the Pro Vice Chancellor of the University of Cape Coast. She was the Provost of the College of Humanities and Legal Studies from 2016 to 2018. Her administrative jurisdiction covered a third of the regular student population and 30% of the population of academic faculty of the University of Cape Coast. She established the first College-Industry Week activities and showcased the College to the Corporate world of Oil and Gas and Business. She facilitated the realization of the GNPC Research Chair of one Million United States Dollars for Petroleum Management. She initiated efforts to establish an Institute for Law and Governance at the University.

She was the Dean of the Faculty of Arts, the Head of Department of English and the Coordinator for the Communicative Skills program. As an academic, she has taught in her discipline at all levels in the University; she has also presented research papers at national and international conferences and published on Discourses in reputable journals and websites, both locally and internationally. She has supervised several post graduate thesis.

Prof. Edu-Buandoh has served either as Chair or member on several statutory and ad-hoc boards and committees at departmental, faculty and university levels, including the Academic Board, Finance Committee, Development Committee, Senior Members Disciplinary Committee. She also had the privilege of serving as the Chairman for the Presidential Committee on Emoluments of Article 71 Office Holders (2012-2016).

== Research ==
Professor Edu-Buandoh's specialization is in the area of English Linguistics, English Language, Literacy and her research interests cover Discourse Studies, Multilingualism, Language and Ideology as well as Literacy.

== Personal life ==
She has one biological son, three granddaughters and many adopted children.

== Awards ==
Professor Edu-Buandoh has won numerous awards including the T. Anne Cleary International Dissertation Award by the University of Iowa, Fulbright Award by the United States Government, Government of Ghana Scholarship, Graduate Fellowship by Ohio University, AILA Solidarity Award by the Association Internationale de Linguistique Appliquée (International Association of Applied Linguistics) and the Alpha Delta Kappa International Women Educators Award.

== Donation ==
She provided shopping vouchers, PPEs and some items to some students of UCC due to the impacts of COVID-19.
