= Intercity STC =

Intercity STC Coaches Limited, formerly known as STC (State Transport Corporation) and Vanef STC, is a Ghanaian joint state and privately owned transport company which operates, transport services, courier services, driver training as well as vehicle valuation, Vehicle testing, and maintenance.

== History ==
The idea of setting up a national bus carrier goes as far as 1909. The Government Transport Department was a governmental entity set up and tasked to look transportation solutions for the then Central Government which was the British colonial administration. On March 9, 1965, a legislative instrument was enacted and this body was mandated to manage commercial transportation services in Ghana. A haulage division was set up somewhere in 1968 and handed over to the STC to manage in addition to the passenger segment which they were already handling. In the year 1995 Intercity STC then State Transport became fully incorporated in Ghana to manage the state's transportation. In the year 2000 Intercity STC was taken by a private company Vanef after it had acquired majority shares in the Intercity STC .

== Ownership ==
Presently Intercity STC is owned by Social Security and National Insurance Trust (SSNIT) which has majority shares after taking over from VANEF and the Government of Ghana who is the minority shareholder.

== Routes ==
Intercity STC plies mostly regional capitals in Ghana including, Kumasi, Sunyani, Takoradi, Cape Coast, Bolgatanga and some few major towns or district capitals like Paga, Dormaa Ahenkro and Tarkwa. It also operates International services to some major cities in neighboring countries like Ouagadougou in Burkina Faso, Abidjan in Ivory Coast and Lomé in Togo. Plans were also in place to extend services to Niamey in Niger.
