= New Juaben North (Ghana parliament constituency) =

Ghana parliament constituency

New Juabeng North
- constituency for the Parliament of Ghana
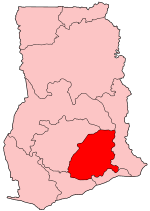
- District: New-Juaben Municipal District
- Region: Eastern Region of Ghana

Current constituency
- Party: New Patriotic Party
- MP: Nana Osei-Adjei

The New Juabeng North constituency is in the Eastern region of Ghana. The member of Parliament elected at the 2024 election is Nana Osei-Adjei. He was elected on the ticket of the New Patriotic Party (NPP) and won a majority of 17,390 of total votes to win the constituency election to become the MP.

== See also ==
- List of Ghana Parliament constituencies
