= Samuel Evans Ashong Narh =

Ghanaian politician

Member of Parliament for Team East

Mayor of Team East Metropolis

Personal details
- Born: 1943 3rd, May Ghana
- Education: Kwame Nkrumah University of Science and Technology; University of Poland
- Profession: Politician; Engineer

Samuel Evans Ashong Narh (born March 5, 1943) is a Ghanaian politician and an engineer. He is a former production manager at GHACEM and is a former member of parliament of the Tema East constituency of the Greater Accra Region of Ghana. Ashong Narh was also a former mayor of the Tema east Metropolis.

== Early life and education ==
Ashong Narh obtained a diploma in mechanical engineering at the Kwame Nkrumah University of Science and Technology in 1996. He then proceeded to the University of Poland where he obtained a Diploma in technology in 1968.

== Personal life ==
Ashong Narh comes from Tema, Manhean, in the Greater Accra Region. He is a Presbyterian.
