= Alexander Ansah Manu =

Ghanaian Public Health Expert

Professor Alexander Ansah Manu is a Ghanaian public health expert, medical statistician and epidemiologist. He is currently a Senior Lecturer at the University of Ghana School of Public Health, serves as the Director of the Institute of Health Research (IHR) at the University of Health and Allied Sciences and was appointed executive director of the Centre for Social Justice (CSJ).

== Education ==
Alexander Manu holds a Bachelor of Medicine and Bachelor of Surgery (MBChB), a Master of Science in Medical Statistics and a PhD in epidemiology.

He obtained his MSc and PhD from the London School of Hygiene and Tropical Medicine (LSHTM) and also holds a diploma of the London School of Hygiene and Tropical Medicine. He also completed his fellowship in Community Health at the West African College of Surgeons.

== Career ==
Alexander serves as a Senior Lecturer at the University of Ghana School of Public Health, where he focuses on epidemiology and disease control. His research interests include newborn, maternal, child and adolescent health, quality improvement, preterm birth and low birth weight and early childhood development.

He has long been involved in the implementation of maternal and perinatal death surveillance and response and quality improvement initiatives and has collaborated with international organizations such as UNICEF, WHO and UNFPA, as well as with funders including the Bill and Melinda Gates Foundation, USAID and Save the Children. He also is a member of technical working groups such as the Countdown to 2030 Child Survival Technical Working Group.

In January 2025, Manu was appointed executive director of the Centre for Social Justice in Ghana with responsibilities including promoting social equity and justice and leading the organization's advocacy, research and community engagement work.
