= Ajeezay =

Ghanaian Actor/Comedian

- Born: Nathaniel Mensah
- Other name: Nonfa King
- Education: University of Cape Coast
- Occupations: Comedian, Musician, Actor
- Awards: Comedian of the year, 2020

Nathaniel Mensah, known by the stage name Ajeezay, is a Ghanaian comedian, actor and musician. He is a one-liner comedian referred to as the Nonfa King or King of Nonfa, nonfa being Ghanaian jargon for ambiguity.

== Early life and career ==
Ajeezay, who is the last of six children, was born to Madam Christiana Fofo Allotey and Mr. Mensah, who was a lawyer. He took his Basic Education Certificate Examination (BESE) at JHS 1 where he passed and attended the Nsaba Presbyterian Senior High School. He graduated with First Class Honours in Bachelor of Science in Education and majored in Chemistry and Biology at the University of Cape Coast.

On 5 December 2020, Ajeezay released his first extended play titled Evolution, featuring names like Rhyme Sonny, Koo Ntakra, Kahpun, Amerado, Teflon Flexx, Ay Poyoo, Brella, Nii Funny, Teshieboi, Bortey and Kuuku Black.

== Discography ==
=== Album ===
- Evolution EP

=== Selected singles ===
- Nonfa King
- Open School
- Apor
- Saw Me
- Sugar Mummy
- Omo Ata
- App
- Nungua
- Jerusalem Soup
- M3kor
- Amanfour Bet
- Dr UN Wakasa
- Kokonte
- Sexual Sponsor
- I Love You Tui Tui.

== Videography ==
- Open School
- Apor
- Sugar Mummy
- Omo Ata
- App
- Nungua
- Jerusalem Soup
- M3kor
- Amanfour Bet
- Dr UN Wakasa
- Kokonte
- Sexual Sponsor
- I Love You Tui Tui

=== Video vixen ===
- Agbeshie - No Worries
- Ruff n Smooth - Shaba
- Shatta Wale - Bie Gya

== Filmography ==
=== Online Skits ===
- Area Boy
- Tit 4 Tat
- Problem Child
- Condom Wahala
- Running Mate
- The Interview
- Make Up Swimming Pool
- Turn Me On

== Awards and nominations ==
Year	Award	Ceremony	Result	Ref
2017	Best Comedy Skit	African Movie Academy Awards	Nominated	
2019	Best Viral Comedy Skit of the Year	COPO Awards	Nominated	
2020	Comedian of the Year	One Awards Ghana	Won	

== Controversies ==
Ajeezay was caught in a hot tug of war with Nigerian comedian Josh2Funny after Ajeezay accused Josh2Funny of copying and rebranding his #NonfaChallenge wordplay concept as the #DontLeaveMeChallenge.

== Philanthropy ==
Ajeezay, together with members of the ABLE Initiative on 3 March 2019, presented some gifts to bomb victim Elizabeth Asantewaa in Dansoman. Elizabeth Asantewaa is known to have saved Ghana's first president Kwame Nkrumah from a bomb attack during the 1964 Independence Day celebration.
