= Mark Assibey-Yeboah =

Ghanaian politician

Member of the Ghana Parliament for New Juaben South (Ghana parliament constituency)
- In office 7 January 2013 – 7 January 2021
- Preceded by: Beatrice Bernice Boateng
- Succeeded by: Michael Okyere Baafi

Personal details
- Born: March 2, 1974 (age 52)
- Party: New Patriotic Party

Mark Assibey-Yeboah (March 2, 1974) is a Ghanaian politician and member of the Sixth and Seventh Parliaments of the Fourth Republic of Ghana, representing the New Juaben South Constituency in the Eastern Region on the ticket of the New Patriotic Party (NPP).

He served as a member of the Finance and Youth and Sports Committees of the Sixth Parliament and as Chairman of the Finance Committee for the Seventh Parliament of the Fourth Republic of Ghana.

== Personal life ==
Assibey-Yeboah is a Christian. He is married with three children.

== Early life and education ==
Mark Assibey-Yeboah was born on March 2, 1974. He hails from Obo-Kwahu, a town in the Eastern Region of Ghana.

He is an old student of Presbyterian Boys' Senior High School Legon, Accra (GCE Ordinary Level) and Ghana Senior High School, Koforidua (GCE Advanced Level). He holds a BSc (Hons) Agricultural Economics degree from Kwame Nkrumah University of Science and Technology (KNUST), Ghana and an MS (Agricultural and Resource Economics) from the University of Delaware, USA. He also holds an MA and a Ph.D. both in Economics from the University of Tennessee, USA specializing in International Macroeconomics, Monetary Economics and Econometrics.

Mark Assibey-Yeboah has been published in reputable journals such as Economic Record, International Journal for Finance and Economics, Journal for International Trade and Economic Development, and The North American Journal of Economics and Finance.

== Employment ==
- Lecturer, University of Tennessee, USA
- Adjunct Faculty, Milligan College, Tennessee, USA
- Senior Economist, Bank of Ghana
- Lecturer, Ghana Telecom (Technology) University College, Accra, Ghana
- Lecturer, Ghana Institute of Management and Public Administration (GIMPA), Accra, Ghana
- Member of Parliament, Ghana (January 7, 2013 - January 6, 2017; 1st term)
- Member of Parliament, Ghana (January 7, 2017– January 6, 2021; 2nd term), chairman, Finance Committee
- Consultant.
- Board member, ADB Bank Ghana, August 2018 - 2021
- Member of American Economic Association
