= John Gyapong =

John Gyapong may refer to:

- John Owusu Gyapong, Ghanaian professor of epidemiology
- John Kwadwo Gyapong, Ghanaian politician and executive director
