= Elizabeth Amoaa =

Ghanaian female reproductive health advocate

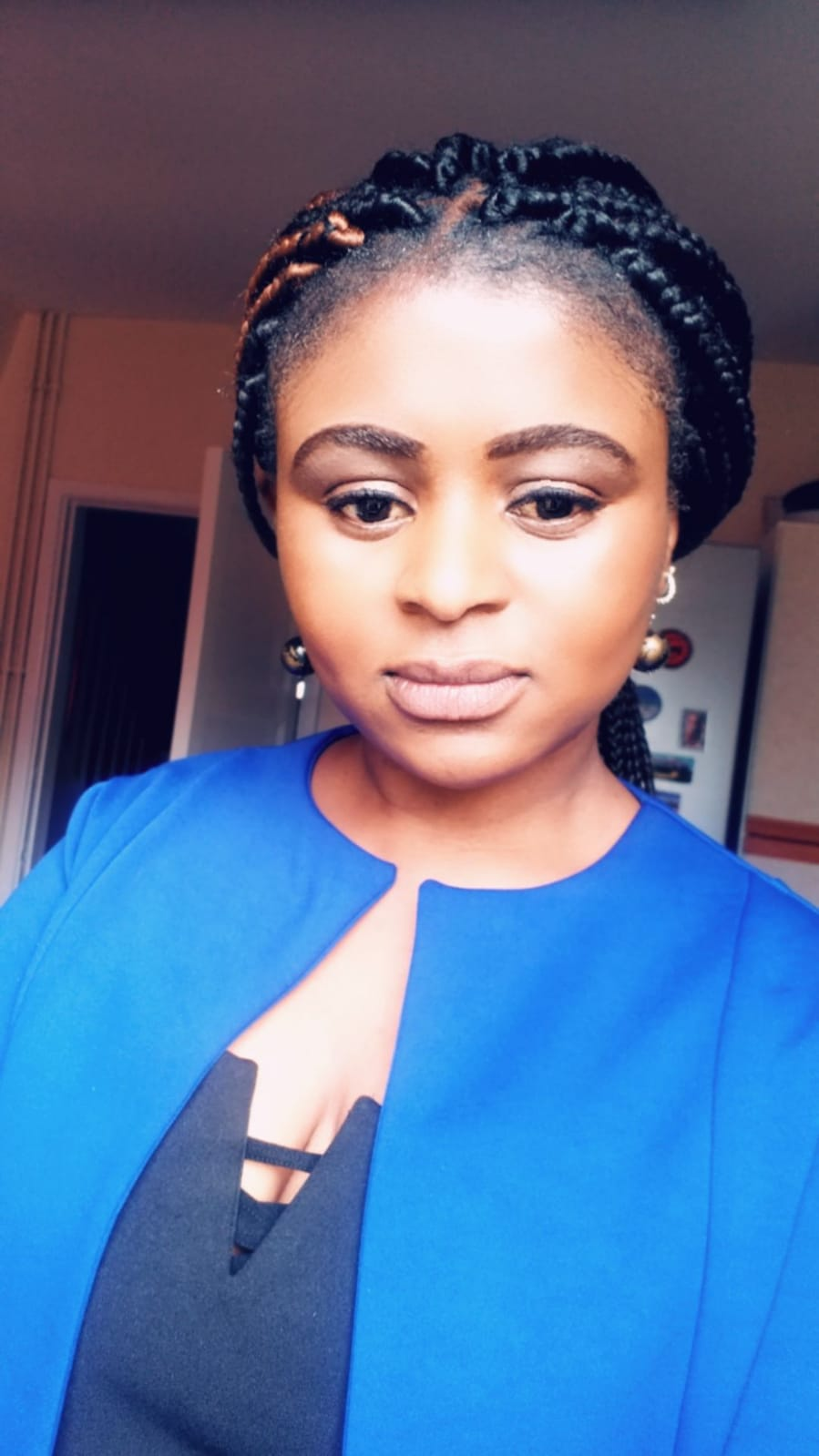
- Amoaa in 2020.
- Born: 16 August 1983 (age 43); Accra, Ghana
- Education: London Metropolitan University, University of Surrey, College Leonard De Vinci, College le Segrais
- Occupation: Reproductive health advocate

Elizabeth Amoaa (born 16 August 1983) is a Ghanaian reproductive health advocate.

== Early life and education ==
Elizabeth Amoaa was born on 16 August 1983 in Accra, Ghana. There, she attended Most Holy Heart Preparatory School in Dansoman. She later moved to France where she completed her secondary school at College le Segrais and college education at College Leonard De Vinci at Melun.

In 2003, she moved to London to pursue her higher education at London Metropolitan University and University of Surrey where she gained her LLB, and LLM, respectively.

== Career ==
She founded the Speciallady Awareness in 2017 with the aim of educating young women about gynecological conditions. She has authored a book entitled The Unspoken Identity. They made donations to organizations, schools, and hospitals in Ghana two years after the Speciallady Awareness was established. She made donations to 37 military hospitals in conjunction with the Speciallady Awareness and 3FM. The Unspoken Identity book is approved by The National Council for Curriculum and Assessment (NaCCA) in Ghana to be used as supplementary educational material in Senior High Schools. The Unspoken Identity book is in 500 libraries and universities worldwide.

== Humanitarian works ==
During the covid lockdown in Ghana in April 2020, Amoaa collaborated with Ghanaian media personality Abeiku Santana to feed thousands of people in Accra. Amoaa's charity Speciallady Awareness regularly carries out outreach projects and donates sanitary products to schools and communities in Ghana. Speciallady Awareness NGO has donated medical supplies valued at 120,000 to healthcare units and donated 25,000 sanitary pads to female students in various communities in Ghana.

== Personal life ==
Elizabeth currently lives in Andover, Hampshire, in the United Kingdom with her husband and has one child.

== Awards and nominations ==
Year	Award Ceremony	Award Presented	Nominated work / Recipient	Result	Ref.
2020	Ghana Outstanding Women Awards	Outstanding Woman in Social Community; Shero of the Year; Outstanding Woman in Health	Herself	Nominated	
2020	Women Of The Year Awards	Wellness Warrior	Herself	Nominated	
2020	Women Make Change Awards	Women Empowerment; Social Entrepreneur	Herself	Nominated	
