= Yaw Barimah =

Ghanaian politician

MP for New Juaben South
- In office 7 January 2001 – 6 January 2009
- President: John Agyekum Kufour

Personal details
- Born: 22 December 1949 (age 76) Kokoben Akropong, Ashanti Region Gold Coast (now Ghana)
- Party: New Patriotic Party
- Education: University of Ghana
- Occupation: Politician
- Profession: Civil servant

Yaw Barimah (born 22 December 1949) is a Ghanaian politician, a lawyer and a member of the Second, Third and Fourth Parliament of the Fourth Republic representing the New Juaben South Constituency formerly called Koforidua in the Eastern Region of Ghana.

== Early life and education ==
Barimah was born on 22 December 1949 at Kokoben Akropong in the Ashanti Region of Ghana. He attended the TI Ahmadiyya Secondary School, Kumasi in 1970.He also attended the University of Ghana and obtained a Degree in Bachelor of Arts. He attended the Ghana School of Law in 1974 where he studied law and became a lawyer.

== Politics ==
Barimah was first elected into Parliament on the ticket of the New Patriotic Party during the 1996 Ghanaian General Elections.

In the 2000 Ghanaian general elections, he stood for the Koforidua constituency and became a member of the third parliament of the fourth republic of Ghana with a total votes cast of 26,884 representing 59.60%. He again contested for the parliamentary seat in December 2004, during the 2004 Ghanaian General elections to the New Juaben South Constituency Formerly known as Koforidua in the Eastern Region of Ghana, where he won and became a member of the fourth parliament of the fourth republic of Ghana. He polled 32,467 votes out of the 54,036 valid votes cast representing 60.10%. He was defeated by Beatrice Bernice Boateng in the Party's Primaries in 2008.

Barimah was appointed as a cabinet minister for Manpower Development & Employment during the regime of His Excellency John Agyekum Kuffour, as at 31 March 2003 he was among the list of ministers. He was also appointed as a Regional Minister for the Eastern Region of Ghana from 2005 to 2007.

== Career ==
Barimah is a civil servant, lawyer and a member of Parliament to the New Juaben South Constituency in the Eastern Region Of Ghana. He was the Former Minister to Manpower Development and Employ, Republic of Ghana.

== Personal life ==
Barimah is a Christian.
