= Ghana Senior High School, Koforidua =

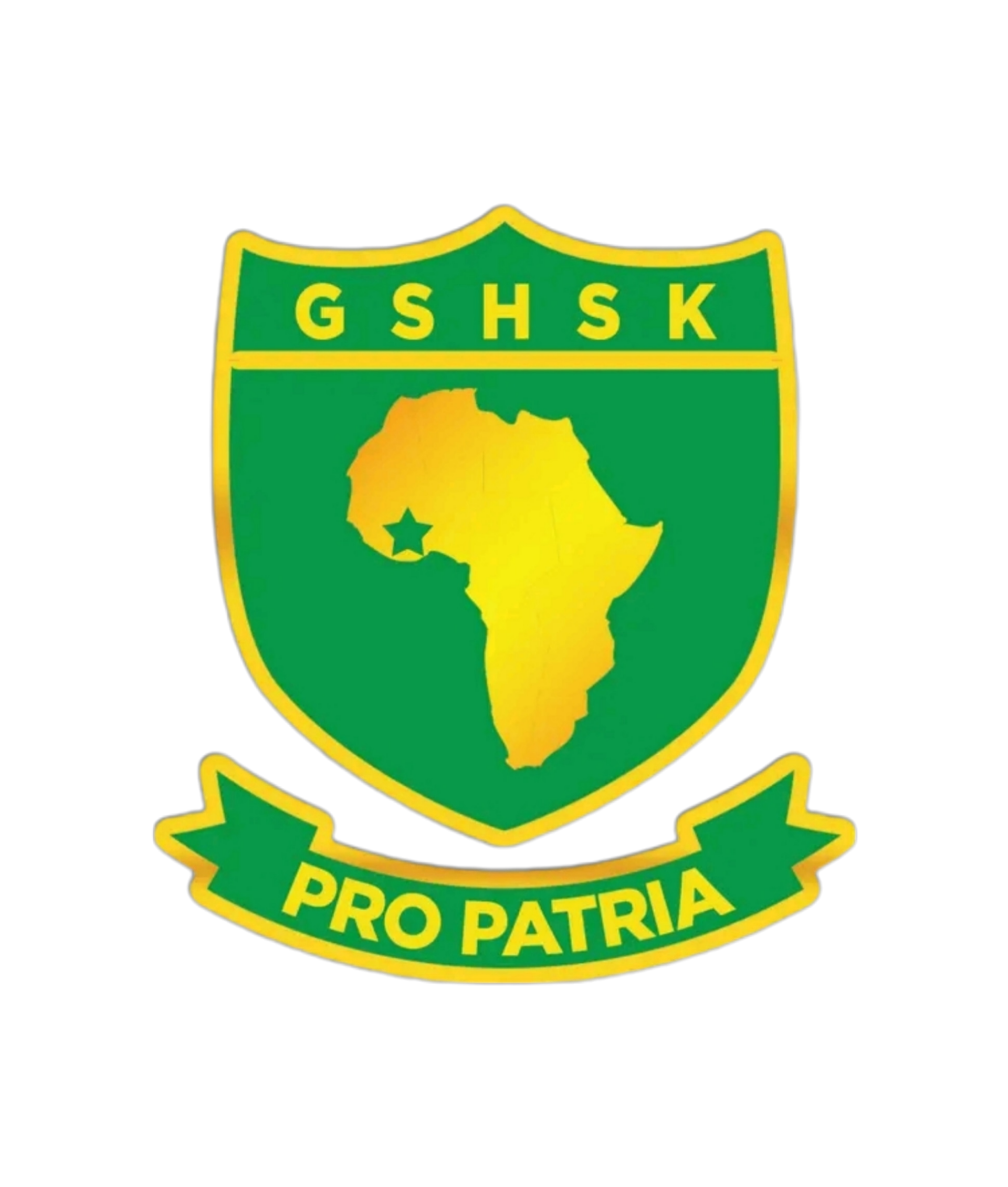
- Ghanass Crest

Location
- P.O. Box 129; Effiduase; Eastern Region; Koforidua; Ghana; 6.10634°N 0.2617°W

Information
- School type: High school Co-educational Boarding/ Residential
- Motto: Latin: Pro Patria (For Our Fatherland)
- Religious affiliation: Non-denominational Christian
- Established: 1943; 83 years ago
- Founder: Fred Addae; Francis Adjei-Tetebo
- Status: Active
- School board: Board of Governors
- School district: New Juaben Municipality
- Authority: Ministry of Education
- Oversight: Ghana Education Service
- Headmistress: Mrs. Diana Mintah
- Staff: 82 teachers, 137 other staff
- Grades: Forms 1–3 (10th – 12th grades)
- Gender: Co-ed
- Age range: 14 to 18 years
- Enrollment: c. 3,700
- Education system: Senior High School
- Language: English
- Campus: Ghanass Campus
- Campus size: 1,100 acres (450 ha)
- Campus type: Residential garden-style Setting
- Houses: Tetebo; Aggrey; Frempong Mposo; Kwaku Boateng; Nyaniba; Juaben Serwaa; Nightingale; Yaa Asantewaa
- Colours: Green and Yellow
- Slogan: Beacon ! Shine !
- Song: "We're the Beacon from the East of Ghana"
- Athletics: Track and Field; Volleyball; Football
- Nickname: GHANASS
- School fees: Covered for students by Free Education Policy
- Alumni: Ghanass Old Students Association (GOSA); Beacon
- Website: gosaglobal

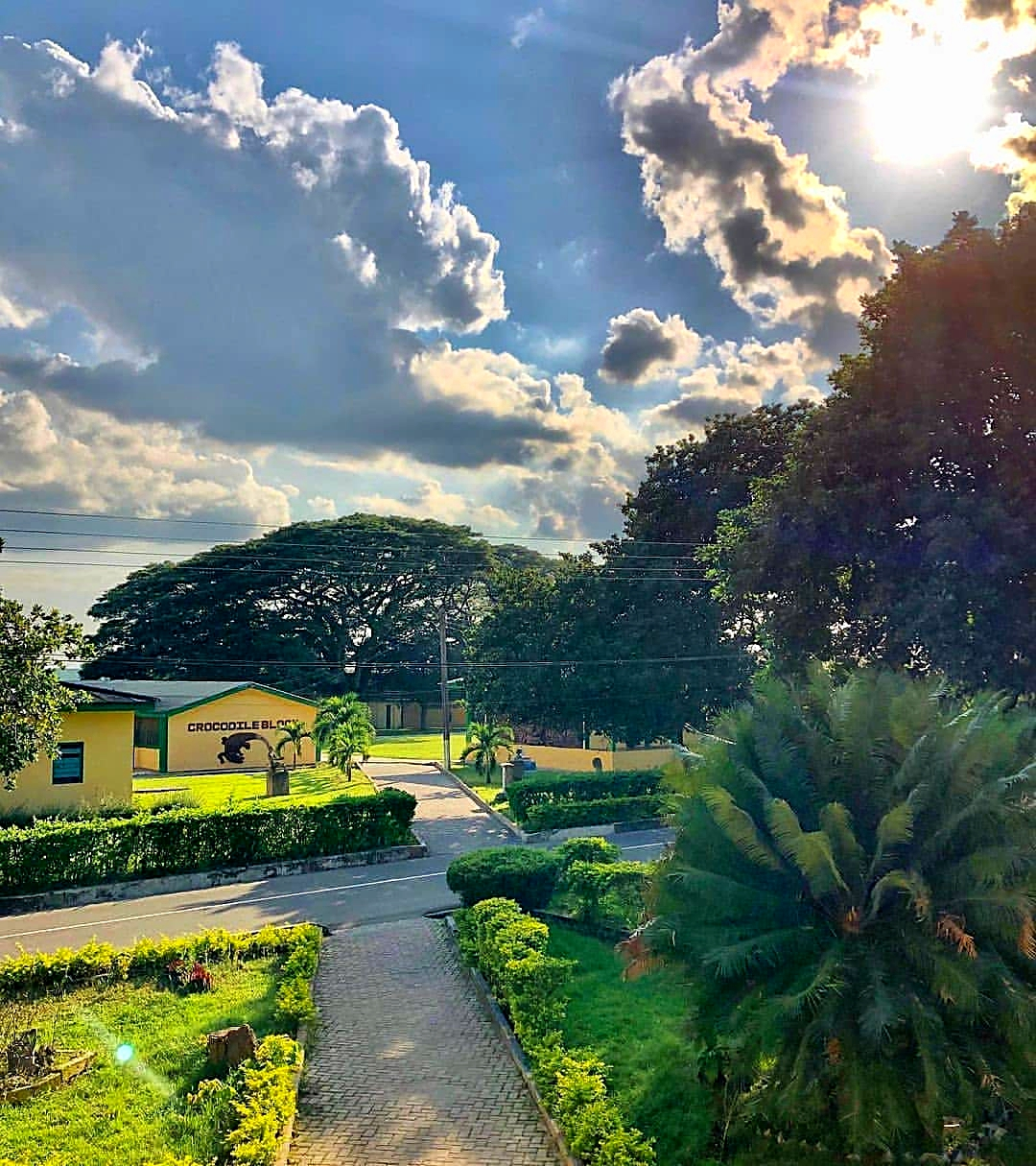
The main Campus "Green & Gold City"

Ghana Senior High School, Koforidua, popularly known as GHANASS (/ɡəˈnæsː/ guh-NAYS), is a co-educational high school in Koforidua, Ghana It was preceded by the establishment of two colleges that later merged to form what is now known as The Beacon of the East.

== History ==
The school, originally named Phoenix College, was founded in 1943 by Fred Addae and Francis Adjei Tetebo, beginning with just sixteen boys in a temporary private building. As enrollment increased, the school moved to a new site in 1950—now home to the Normal Technical Institute in Koforidua—and adopted the name Christ College.

To accommodate further growth, the institution relocated to Effiduase, occupying premises now used by the Effiduase Police Quarters in Koforidua. This move was made possible through the efforts of . Nimako, W. T. Wutor, and Nana Frempong Mposo II. During this time, Francis Adjei Tetebo served as principal following the death of co-founder Fred Addae

=== Later developments ===
In 1957, the year Ghana gained independence, Kwame Nkrumah visited Koforidua and requested that the school’s name be changed from Christ College to Ghana Secondary School. The change brought the institution in line with other government-established secondary schools such as Ghana National College in Cape Coast and Ghana Secondary Technical School in Takoradi.

That same year, the school became part of the public education system, and Daniel Ofori Dankwa, formerly a science teacher at Accra Academy, was appointed headmaster. The school held its first speech and prize-giving day in 1957, with an enrollment of 100 boys and six girls, supported by six teachers. Dankwa served until his promotion to Director of Education in 1974, when R. P. Nyarko succeeded him as headmaster.

As of 2015, the school has an enrollment of more than 2,300 students and employs about 80 teachers.

== Curriculum ==
- Business
- General Arts
- General Science
- Home Economics
- Visual Arts
- Agricultural Science

== Campus ==
Below are the facilities provided for the school

- Class Room
- ICT Lab
- Science Lab
- Library

== Notable alumni ==
The alumni association of the school, known as Ghanass Old Students Association (GOSA), have an established history of producing accomplished individuals who have made their mark in various fields. Some of the alumni include:

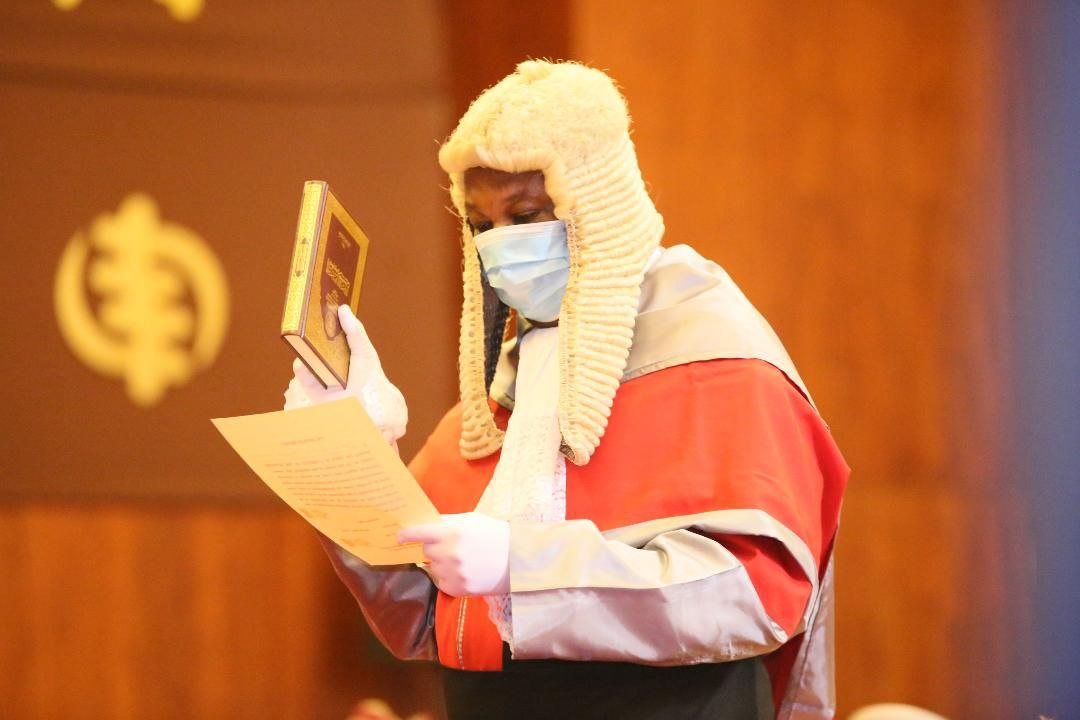
Justice Issifu Omoro Tanko Amadu, Justice of the Supreme Court of Ghana.

- Justice Issifu Omoro Tanko Amadu – Justice of the Supreme Court of Ghana
- Mark Assibey-Yeboah – Ghanaian politician and member of parliament
- Abeiku Santana – media personality and entrepreneur
- Rebekah Awuah – journalist and news anchor at Ghana Broadcasting Corporation
- Ama Serwah Nerquaye-Tetteh – Secretary-General of the Ghana Commission for UNESCO
- Gifty Oware-Mensah – deputy director of National Service Scheme
- Kurt Okraku – president of the Ghana Football Association
- King Tackie Teiko Tsuru II– Gã Mantse
- Kwabena Baah-Duodu – Ghanaian diplomat
- Frank Albert Odoom – Former Director General of Social Security and National Insurance Trust (SSNIT)
- Professor Lydia Aziato – former dean of nursing and midwifery at the University of Ghana and current vice chancellor of University of Health and Allied Sciences
- Michael Okyere Baafi – member of parliament and deputy minister for trade and industry
- Kwaku Ofori Asiamah – former Minister of transport
- Kwasi Boateng Adjei – member of parliament and former deputy minister for local government
- Gloria Sarfo – actress and media personality
- Ohemaa Mercy – gospel musician
- Angel Maxine – Ghanaian musician
- Okailey Verse – Ghanaian musician, singer and songwriter
- Raymond Owusu – Ghanaian professional footballer

== Former headteachers ==
Name	Tenure of Office
Daniel Ofori Dankwa	1957-1974
R. P. Nyarko	1974-1979
G. A. Frempong	1979-1983
R. T. Sackey	1983-1985
G. A. Agyepong	1985-1992
E. K. Darko	1992-1996
S. O. Amaning	1996-2002
Rosemond Bampoe	2002-2011
Abraham Osei-Donkor	2011-2018
Jacob Afful	2018-2021
Patience Naki Mensah	2021-2023
Diana Mintah	2023–present

== School Code ==
0020104
