= Juaben (disambiguation) =

Juaben may refer to

- Ejisu-Juaben District
- New-Juaben Municipal District

== Constituency ==
- New Juaben North Constituency (Ghana parliament constituency)
- New Juaben South Constituency (Ghana parliament constituency)

== Town ==
Juaben may also refer to: Juaben a town in the Ashanti Region
