= MTN Hitmaker =

- Genre: Reality; Talent contest
- Country of origin: Ghana
- Original language: English
- No. of seasons: 9

Original release
- Network: TV3

MTN Hitmaker is a television music competition created by MTN Ghana in 2011. The show is available to all amateur musicians living in Ghana or who are habitually residing in Ghana. Since its inception in 2012, the competition has fostered and injected several music talents into the public. Some of these artists include Kwame Eugene, Kidi, Fameye and Mr Drew.

== Format ==
=== Auditions ===
Every year's competition begins with a series of audition stages, the first of which, termed "Scouting," is guided by some of Ghana's beatmakers who are experienced in all music genre. This stage is open to all types of music performed by independent groups, and it chooses who will compete. The judges in charge of that year's event attend these, which are hosted in a public setting in selected cities across the country. Each participant who makes it to the next stage of the auditions is sent to a waiting room offstage from the main performance area and given a number that indicates when they will perform. Contestants are given two chances to perform for the panel before being judged solely on their delivery.

=== Live Rounds ===
After the format's inception and later alteration to match other reality shows, participants who pass their auditions and achieve a place in the live rounds of the competitions are allocated to beatmakers and compete against each other to secure a position in the live final of the competition. The competition's live episodes are staged in a specific location within the country, with live episodes for each season shown weekly on the TV3 network. The layout of the live rounds changes yearly by this stage of the competition, but it is more often organized as quarter-finals, semi-finals, and the final itself - earlier seasons differed, with the finals sometimes being separated into different rounds.

Those who advance to the season's final compete for the most public votes, with the number of finalists varying from season to season - later seasons allow each finalist to perform more than once, and also perform in groups. The winning artist with the most votes and the highest judges score is declared the winner and receives a monetary award together with a record deal.

== Judges and Hosts ==
Season	Hosts	Judges			
1	Bola Ray; Nana Aba Anamoah	Zapp Mallet	Bessa Simon		Ofie Kudjoe
2	Bola Ray	Zapp Mallet	Bessa Simon		Ofie Kudjoe
3	Bola Ray; Peace Hyde	Okyeame Kwame	Bessa Simon	Hammar	Ofie Kudjoe
4	Peace Hyde	Okyeame Kwame	Bessa Simon	Akwesi Aboagye	Ofie Kudjoe
5	Giovani Caleb; Peace Hyde	Okyeame Kwame	Eazzy	Mark Okraku-Mantey	
6	Berla Mundi	Kaywa	Eazzy		
7	Berla Mundi	Kaywa	Eazzy	Appietus	
8	Berla Mundi	Kaywa	Eazzy	Richie Mensah	
9	Sika Osei; Erskine Amo Whyte	Kaywa	Eazzy	Richie Mensah	

== Season synopses ==
Season	Year	Awards				Ref
Season	Year	Winners	Runner Ups			Ref
1	2012	Naterial	Chiki	Miriam	ATM (Atimbila)	
2	2013	Koo Ntakara	Cano Z	Kofi Korea	K Bee	
3	2014	Torgbe	Mac M	Naba	Snow B	
4	2015	KiDi	Abena	Yaw	Gunshot	
5	2016	Kurl Songx	F9	Kwame Eugene	Sir Tino	
6	2017	Freda Rhymz	Mr Drew	Yaw Berk	Xali	
7	2018	Okailey Verse	Awal	Erza Tamaa	Amakye	
8	2019	Lasmid	Alibaba	Kofi Pages	Nessa	
9	2020	Adepa	Kobby Tuesday	Gabi Nova	Achiaa	
