= Frank Albert Odoom =

Ghanaian insurance expect and academic

- Education: Ghana Secondary School, Koforidua; University of Cape Coast; Iowa State University; University of Manitoba (BSc, PhD, MSc)
- Occupations: Academic; Civil Servant
- Known for: Director General, Social Security and National Insurance Trust

Frank Albert Odoom is a Ghanaian public servant, an insurance expect, and an academic who was the Director General of Social Security and National Insurance Trust (SSNIT) from 2010 to 2013.

== Education ==
Frank Odoom had his secondary education at Ghana Secondary School, Koforidua. He proceeded to University of Cape Coast in Cape Coast, Ghana, where he obtained bachelor’s degree in science education and later proceeded to Iowa State University in the US where he obtained a Ph.D. He later obtained an MSc in Actuarial Science from the University of Manitoba in Canada.

== Career ==
Odoom has worked as a lecturer at various universities in Ghana, the United States, and Canada. He became Director General of Social Security and National Insurance Trust in 2010.
