= Kwasi Boateng Adjei =

Ghanaian politician (born 1954)

Hon. Kwasi Boateng Adjei
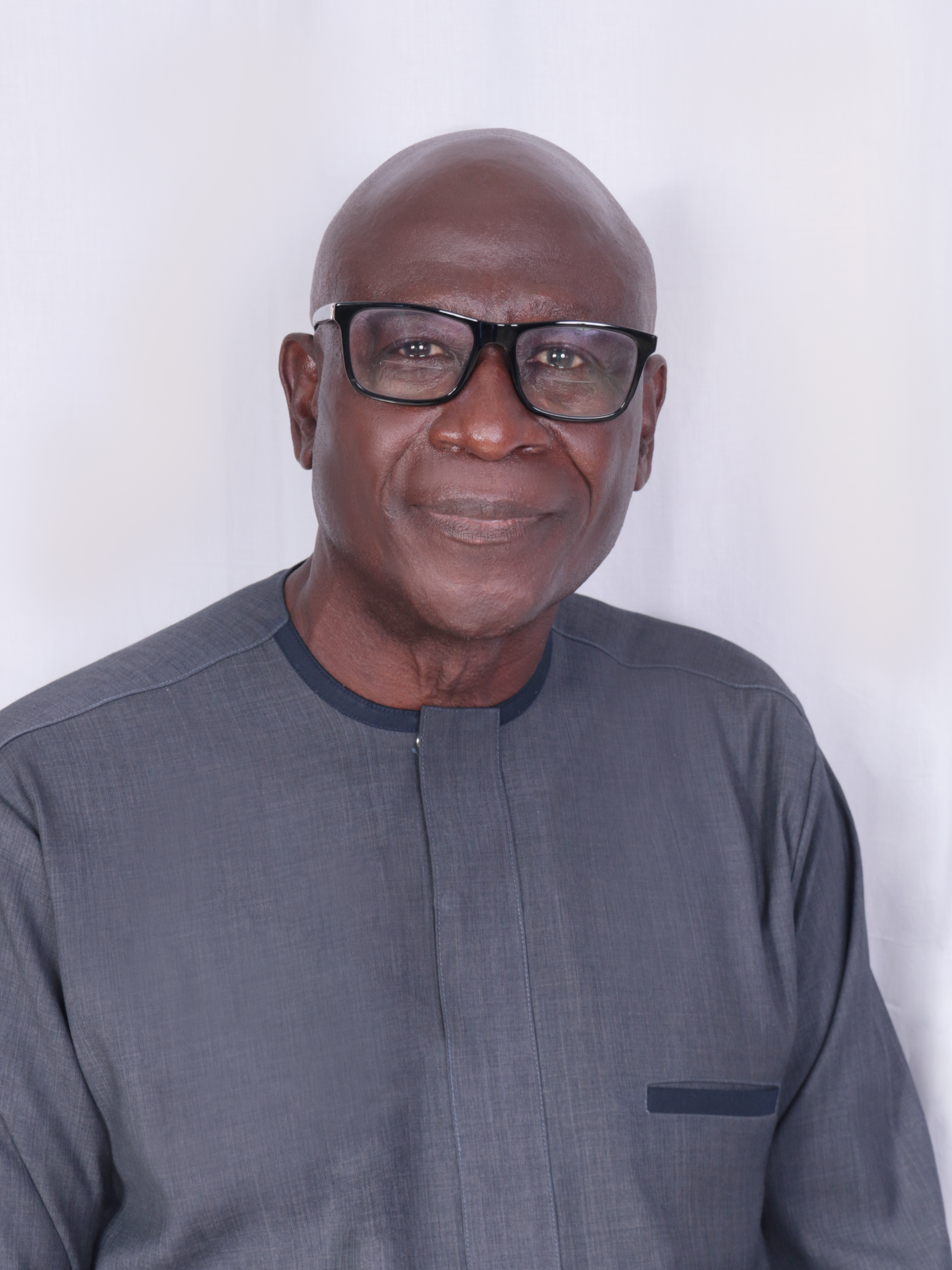
- Adjei in 2021

Member of Parliament for New Juaben North
- Incumbent
- Assumed office 7 January 2017
- Preceded by: Hackman Owusu-Agyeman

Deputy Minister for Local Government (Ghana)
- In office 2017–2021
- President: Nana Akufo-Addo

Personal details
- Born: Kwasi Boateng Adjei; 29 August 1954 (age 72) Koforidua, Ghana
- Party: New Patriotic Party
- Children: 3
- Education: Ghana Senior High School, Koforidua; University of Ghana
- Occupation: Administrator, Politician

Kwasi Boateng Adjei (born August 29, 1954) is a Ghanaian politician and member of the Seventh Parliament of the Fourth Republic of Ghana representing the New Juaben North Constituency in the Eastern Region on the ticket of the New Patriotic Party (NPP). A Deputy Minister for Local Government and Rural Development from 2017 to Date.

== Early life and education ==
Adjei was born on August 29, 1954. He hails from Asokore – New Juaben, a town in the Eastern Region of Ghana. He had his secondary education at Ghana Senior High School, Koforidua. He entered University of Ghana and obtained his Bachelor of Science degree in business administration in 1980.

== Politics ==
Adjei is a member of the New Patriotic Party (NPP). In 2012, he contested for the New Juaben North seat on the ticket of the NPP sixth parliament of the fourth republic and won.

== Employment ==
- MCE (May 2001–January 2009)
- Managing Head at New Juaben College of Commerce, Koforidua
- Manager, administrator, HR practitioner

== Personal life ==
Adjei is a Christian (Methodist). He is married, and has three children.
