= Ama Serwah Nerquaye-Tetteh =

Ghanaian policy analyst

- Born: Ghana
- Education: Ghana Secondary School
- Alma mater: Kwame Nkrumah University of Science and Technology; University of Ghana; University of Leeds; University of Bedfordshire
- Occupations: Educationist and Policy Analyst
- Employer: UNESCO

Ama Serwah Nerquaye-Tetteh is the Deputy Director-General in charge of the administration and general services at the Institute for Educational Planning and Administration and was the Secretary-General of the Ghana Commission for UNESCO.

== Education ==
Ama Serwah Nerquaye-Tetteh had her Secondary education at Ghana Secondary School in Koforidua. She holds a honours degree in English and French from the Kwame Nkrumah University of Science and Technology, an M.Phil and MA in Educational Leadership and Management from the University of Ghana, an MA in International Communications from the University of Leeds and a postgraduate Certificate in Education from the University of Bedfordshire.

== Career ==
Ama Serwah begun her career as a teacher, with teaching stints in both Ghana and the UK. She was appointed as the Secretary-General of the Ghana Commission for UNESCO from 2017 to 2024, and later in 2025, took on the role of Deputy Director-General, overseeing administration and general services at the Institute for Educational Planning and Management (IEPA). She also ventured into politics. During her tenure as Secretary-General, the commission reported activities across education, natural sciences, culture and communication, and coordinated Ghana's participation in several UNESCO-related programmes and meetings.

=== International engagements ===
As secretary-general, she represented Ghana on the executive board during its 216th session which was held in May 2023 in Paris. The session prepared the provisional agenda and organization of the 42nd session of the General conference. She was also a panelist in a 2022 consultation on the revision of the 1974 Recommendation concerning education for international understanding, co-operation and peace and education for human rights and fundamental freedoms. The Ghana Commission's 2024 performance report states that the Commission facilitated Ghana's participation in the 10th session of the General Assembly of the State Parties to the Convention for the Safeguarding of the Intangible Cultural Heritage at UNESCO Headquarters in Paris on 11-12 June 2024, and in the 26th session of the International Hydrological Programme Council at UNESCO Headquarters in Paris on 3-7 June 2024.

=== STEM and girls' education ===
In 2024, the Ghana Commission for UNESCO and the Technology Consultancy Centre / International Centre for Innovation, Manufacturing, Technology Transfer and Entrepreneurship (TCC-CIMET) at Kwame Nkrumah University of Science and Technology organized activities for World Engineering Day that included Internet of Things workshops, a STEM empowerment programme for senior high schools and a webinar.

The commission's performance report also records an official visit by Nerquaye-Tetteh to the Technology Consultancy Centre at KNUST on 6 February 2024. UNESCO's Open and Inclusive Science Hub describes the Women in STEM (WiSTEM) Ghana Girls' Camp, launched at KNUST in 2018, as a five-day camp bringing together girls from 20–30 senior high schools in the Ashanti, Bono and Western North regions for career development, coding, artificial intelligence exposure and mentorship. In a 2023 address at the 80th anniversary of Ghana Secondary School, Koforidua, she urged stakeholders to support inclusive education and encourage girls to pursue science, technology, engineering and mathematics pathways.

=== Biosphere reserves and natural heritage ===
Under her tenure, the Ghana Commission for UNESCO reported support for the National Man and the Biosphere Committee, Ghana's participation in the 36th session of the MAB Council, the 4th National Forum on Biosphere Reserves and Sustainable Development, and volunteer placements supporting work at the Songor Ramsar and UNESCO Biosphere Reserve and the Bia Biosphere Reserve. In 2021, Nerquaye-Tetteh helped launch a handbook intended to guide the mainstreaming of biosphere reserves into district planning and said biosphere-reserve concepts could help Ghana restore biodiversity while deriving sustainable ecosystem benefits. UNESCO's Man and the Biosphere Programme identifies Songor as a biosphere reserve in Ghana designated in 2011, while UNESCO reported that a green-economy project at Bia supported 235 direct beneficiaries, including 91 women, through training in livelihood alternatives such as mushroom production, beekeeping, snail rearing and palm-oil processing.

== Personal life ==
Ama Serwah is married and has 3 children.
