= Okailey Verse =

Ghanaian singer-songwriter

- Also known as: OV; Original Version
- Born: Barbara Naa Okailey Nyarko; 4 December 1998 (age 27); Accra, Ghana
- Genres: Afrobeats, Afro pop, Highlife, Dancehall
- Occupations: Singer, songwriter,
- Instruments: Piano, guitar
- Years active: 2018–present
- Label: Blakk Arm Label

Barbara Naa Okailey Nyarko (born on 4th of December 1998) known professionally with the stage name Okailey Verse, OV or Original Version is a Ghanaian musician, singer and songwriter. She was crowned winner of the MTN Hitmaker Season 7. She is best known for her viral song Want Me featuring Ghanaian dancehall artist Stonebwoy.

== Early life and education ==
OV had her secondary education at Ghana Senior High School, Koforidua. In an interview, she mentioned that she had always dreamed of attending law school and becoming a lawyer, but her parents disagreed with her decision.

== Music career ==
In 2018, OV won the MTN Hitmaker season 7 competition, for which she received a GH₵100,000 recording deal. Following the contest, Ghanaian dancehall artist Stonebwoy signed her to his record label, Burniton Music Group. She went on to collaborate with Stonebwoy and Kelvyn Boy, her label mate at the time.

== Controversies ==
In 2020, OV parted ways with Stonebwoy's record label, Burniton Music Group, to join forces with Blakk Cedi, who had previously managed Stonebwoy before their split. Stonebwoy later confirmed OV's departure from the label in an interview.

== Discography ==
- Kambu
- Ma Mind Dey ft Epixode
- Want Me ft Stonebwoy
- Zaddy ft Kelvyn Boy
- Forward
- Blessings & Lessons
