= Issifu Omoro Tanko Amadu =

Ghanaian judge (born 1957)

Justice Issifu Omoro Tanko Amadu
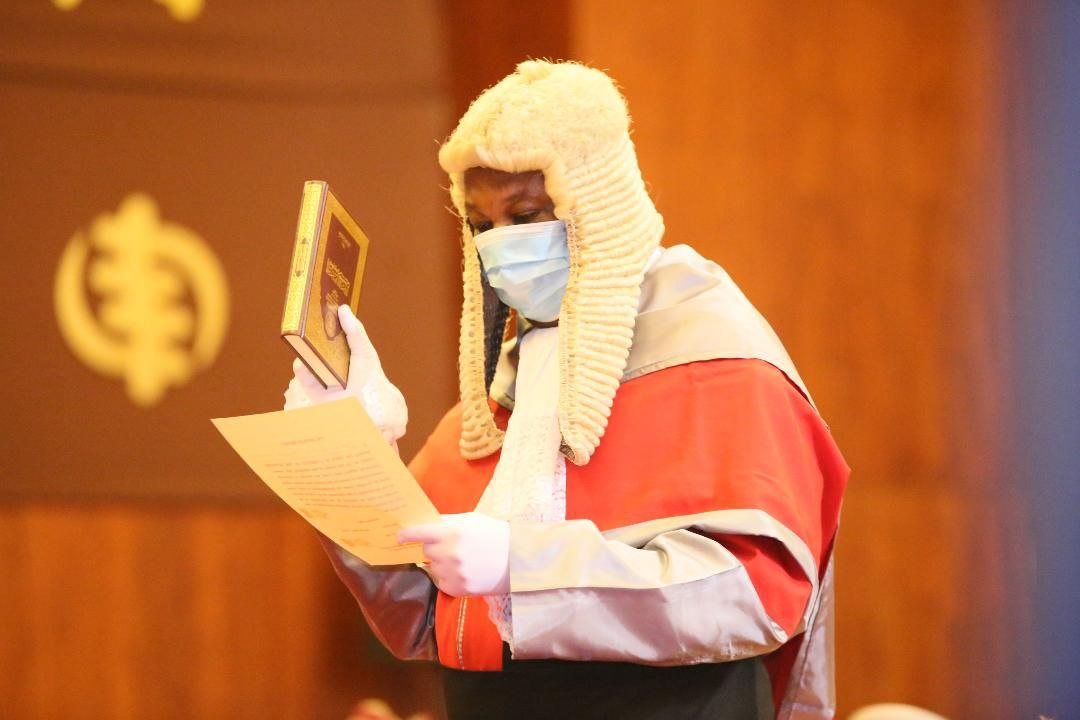

Justice of the Supreme Court of Ghana
- Incumbent
- Assumed office 2020
- Appointed by: Nana Akufo-Addo

Justice of the Appeal Court of Ghana
- In office 2012–2020
- Nominated by: John Mahama

Justice of the High Court of Ghana
- In office 2008–2012
- President: John Kufour

Personal details
- Born: 11 September 1957 (age 68) Dodowa, Ghana
- Education: Ghanata Senior High School; Ghana Senior High School
- Alma mater: University of Ghana; Ghana School of Law; Nigerian Law School
- Profession: Judge

Issifu Omoro Tanko Amadu (born 11 September 1957) is a Supreme Court judge of the Republic of Ghana.

He was a Justice of the High Court from 2008 till 2012. He became an Appeal court judge from 2012. He was nominated by President Nana Akufo-Addo. He is the first Muslim to serve on Ghana's Supreme Court.

== Personal life and education ==
Issifu Omoro Tanko Amadu was born on 11 September 1957 in Dodowa in the Greater Accra Region of Ghana.

He attended District Assembly Primary School and Methodist Middle School, both located in Dodowa, for his basic education. He later had his secondary education at Ghanata Senior High School and Ghana Senior High School situated in Koforidua. He obtained his LLB at the University of Ghana and moved on to the Ghana School of Law for his professional law course. He sojourned in Nigeria before obtaining a professional law course at a law school in that country.

== Career ==
After gaining some practical experience with Azinyo Chambers located in Accra, he worked with some Nigerian law firms such as A.C Mathews & Co. and later as an Associate Member of Alao Aka Bashorun & Co. both located in Lagos. He worked as a lawyer in Nigeria for nineteen years.

He founded his own firm and became the Principal of Amadu & Co. in 1997 and after the Senior Partner Amadu, Ansah-Obiri & Co. He was appointed to the High Court in 2008 and was promoted to the Court of Appeal in 2012.

== Nomination ==
He was sworn into office by the president Nana Akufo-Addo. It was done at a ceremony at the Jubilee House. His nomination was approved by the Parliament of Ghana with other three judges after they were vetted. The rest were Clemence Jackson Honyenuga, Henrietta Mensa-Bonsu, and Emmanuel Yonny Kulendi.

== Awards ==
He received a Humanity Award from the Humanity Magazine International for inspiring Zongo communities in the field of law.

== Later life ==
In May 2021, he joined Godfred Yeboah Dame to honor an invitation by Osman Nuhu Sharubutu to discuss some issues in Ghana and how to chart a way to resolve them amicably.

== See also ==
- Supreme Court of Ghana
- List of judges of the Supreme Court of Ghana
