= Erskine Amo Whyte =

Ghanaian radio and TV presenter (born 1992)

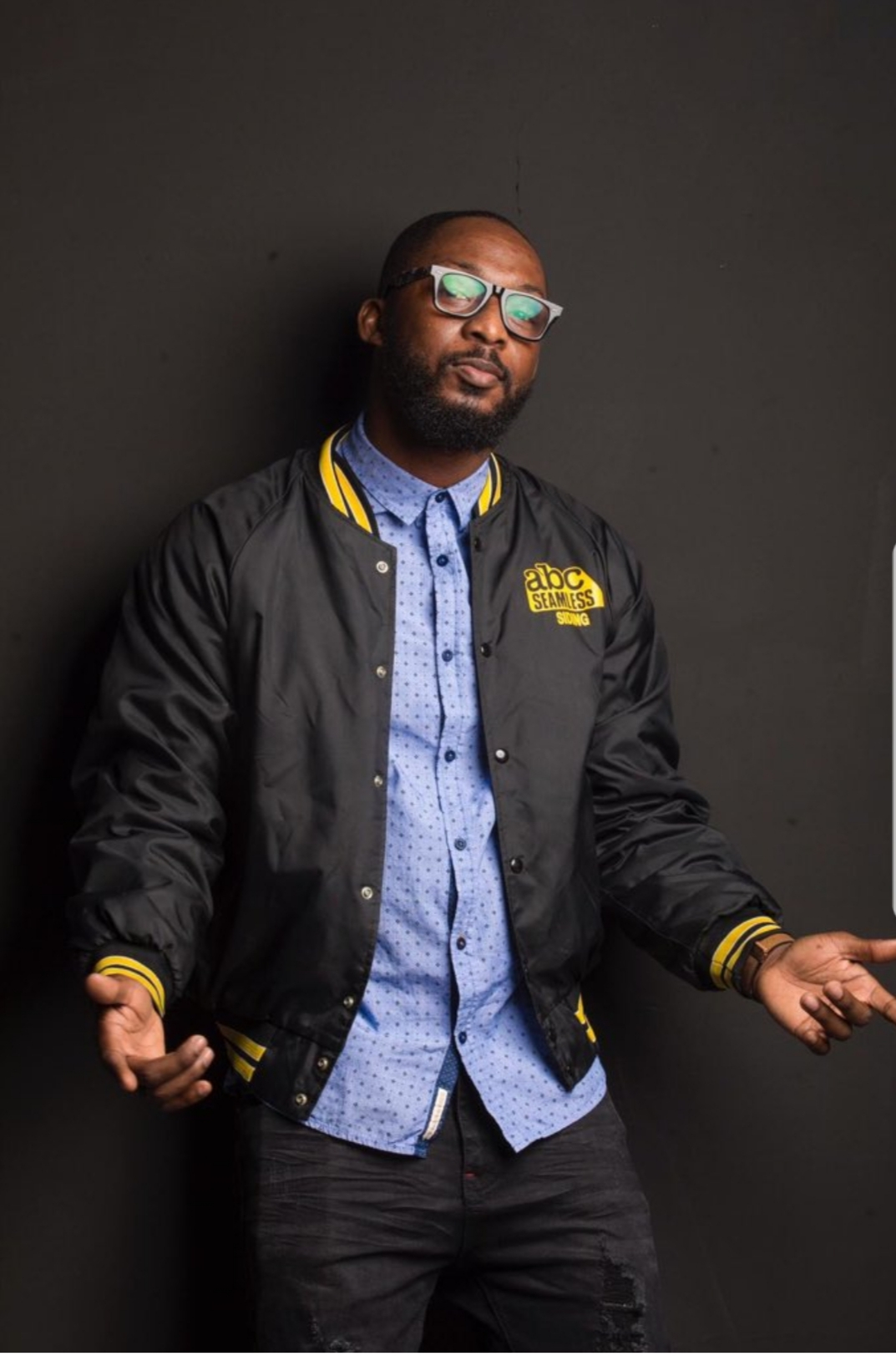
- Erskine Studio Shoot
- Born: Erskine Amo Whyte; April 21, 1992; Ashanti region, Ghana
- Spouse: Nancy Warlson Annan
- Career
- Show: YCampus Express Top20countdownOnY; Daily Entertainment News Update
- Station(s): YFM 4SyteTv

Erskine Amo Whyte, known professionally as Rev Erskine was born on April 21, 1992. is a Ghanaian radio and television presenter and event compere who was born and raised in Kumasi in the Ashanti region of Ghana. He was the host of the Y Campus Express on Y 107.9 fm, and the Official iTunes Chart show on 4SyteTV. Rev Erskine is now known as the host of YFM's MydMorning Radio Show and The YLeaderboard Series.

== Early life and education ==
Erskine Amo Whyte was born on Tuesday April 1, 1992 in Danyame a suburb of Kumasi in the Ashanti Region. Erskine had his secondary education at Anglican Senior High School in Kumasi and went on to the University of Ghana where he studied economics and political science.

== Radio and TV career ==
In 2013, Erskine joined the Y Campus Express radio show team as the assistant producer and reporter for the University of Ghana and eventually took over as the host for Y Campus Express in 2015. In February 2019, Rev became the host of the Myd Morning radio Show. He hosted the Top 20 countdown show and the voice behind the daily entertainment news update on 4syteTv.

He hosts a youth empowerment show called YleaderBoardSeries and has interviewed countless Ghanaian personalities including Hon. Kennedy Agyapong, Albert Ocran, Azumah Nelson and Shatta Wale.

Apart from radio and TV hosting, Erskine has also acted and was featured in Selfie, a Kobi Rana movie which also features Adjetey Annan, Mzbel, Kafui Danku and more.

On March 25, 2018, Rev Erskine launched his #RevPlugNPlay social media campaign to support upcoming artiste & music producers into getting the right connections as well as airplay on radio & TV. In 2020 amidst the COVID-19 pandemic, Rev Erskine was unveiled as the Host of Ghana's biggest Music reality show MTN Hitmaker.

== Achievements ==
In 2015, he was appointed as an MTN Pulse brand ambassador together with 7 other influential young people in Ghana and went on to star in a music video for MTN Pulse theme song "Just Be" and Television commercial for MTN Pulse daily mash up bundle. Rev was awarded the overall best and most influential Male Student Radio Presenter at the 2016 UMB Ghana Tertiary Awards ceremony. 3G Media in the US in 2019 honored Rev Erskine at the 3G media awards for His excellence in Ghana's media terrain.

== Nominations ==
Erskine was nominated in the 2016 Ghana Tertiary Awards as the Most Influential Student of the Year and Most Influential Student Radio Presenter male. The award ceremony took place in October 2016 in Accra. Rev Erskine was nominated as the Best Radio Personality (Male) in the 2018 and 2019 Ghana Entertainment Awards USA.

== Personal life ==
Rev Erskine is married to Nancy Warlson Annan, the two tied the knot on November 21, 2020.

The couple has been blessed with a beautiful baby boy in December 2021.
