= African Research Universities Alliance =

Background information on ARUA

The African Research Universities Alliance (ARUA) is an alliance of 23 research universities in Africa. Founded in March 2015 in Dakar, Senegal, ARUA seeks to enhance research and graduate training among its member universities through various avenues, including the establishment of Centers of Excellence (CoEs) across member institutions. The UK Government has provided significant funding to support the establishment of the ARUA CoEs.

ARUA's focus is on working together, and the alliance brings together peer African universities that are willing to collaborate by pooling their limited resources to generate a critical mass that can more effectively support their limited but growing numbers of researchers. ARUA's efforts are therefore centred on four main thrusts: collaborative research, training and support for doctoral students, capacity building for research management, and research advocacy.

== History ==
The alliance was launched in Dakar, Senegal by fifteen universities in March 2015. These universities included the Universities of Lagos, Ibadan and Obafemi Awolowo in Nigeria, the University of Ghana, Makerere University in Uganda, the University of Nairobi in Kenya, the University of Dar es Salaam in Tanzania, the National University of Rwanda, Université Cheikh Anta Diop in Senegal, and in South Africa the Universities of the Witwatersrand, Cape Town, Stellenbosch, Pretoria, KwaZulu-Natal and Rhodes. Five of these universities had participated in the Higher Education Research and Advocacy Network in Africa (HERANA) project and thus found commonalities that formed the basis for forming the ARUA network. The Carnegie Corporation of New York was instrumental in funding the initiative.

== Governance ==
The governance of ARUA is led by a Board which comprises the Vice Chancellors of all member universities. The functions of the Board and its authority are derived from the Alliance's constitution. The Board has a chair and a co-chair who are elected every three years. The Board is assisted in its work by the executive committee, which is a subset of the Board. The management of the Alliance is done through its Secretary-General.

The ARUA Board is currently chaired by Prof. Sizwe Mabizela and Prof. Nana Aba Appiah Amfo. The Secretariat is headed by Prof. John Owusu Gyapong, who took over from Prof. Ernest Aryeetey as Secretary-General in August 2024.

== Membership ==
ARUA's membership remains strictly by invitation from its Board. The Alliance currently has 20 member universities and three (3) associate members. The membership is as follows:

	Institution	Country
1	Addis Ababa University	Ethiopia
2	University of Lagos	Nigeria
3	University of Ibadan	Nigeria
4	Obafemi Awolowo University	Nigeria
5	University of Nigeria	Nigeria
6	University of Ghana	Ghana
7	Kwame Nkrumah University of Science and Technology	Ghana
8	University of Cape Coast	Ghana
9	University of Dar es Salaam	Tanzania
10	University of Nairobi	Kenya
11	Université Cheikh Anta Diop	Senegal
12	Makerere University	Uganda
13	University of Rwanda	Rwanda
14	University of Witwatersrand	South Africa
15	University of Pretoria	South Africa
16	Stellenbosch University	South Africa
17	Rhodes University	South Africa
18	University of Cape Town	South Africa
19	University of KwaZulu-Natal	South Africa
20	University Mohammed VI Polytechnic	Morocco
21	University of Mauritius	Mauritius
22	University of Kinshasa (Associate Member)	Democratic Republic of Congo
23	Eduardo Mondlane University (Associate Member)	Mozambique

== Partnerships and collaborations ==
Since its inception, ARUA has fostered a growing number of partnerships and collaborations with funding institutions such as the Andrew W. Mellon Foundation, the National Research Foundation, the UK Research and Innovation, Carnegie Corporation of New York, The Kresge Foundation, and Clarivate Analytics. The Alliance has signed MoUs with the Association of Commonwealth Universities (ACU), the University of Glasgow, The Guild of European Research-Intensive Universities (The Guild) and the Universitas 21 (U21).
