= Osman Nuhu Sharubutu =

Chief Imam of Ghana (born 1919/1923)

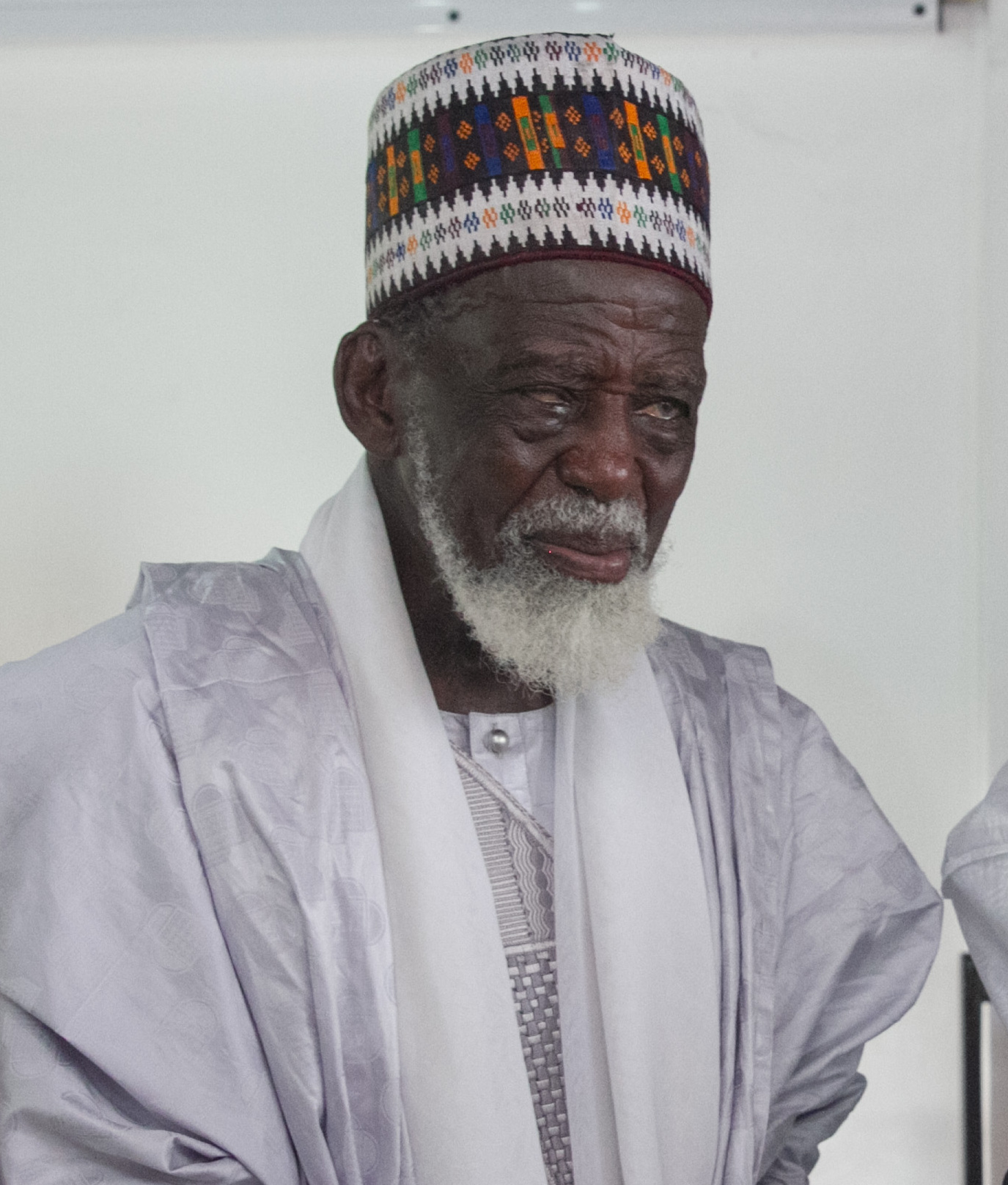
- Sheikh Sharubutu

Personal life
- Born: 23 April 1919 or 23 April 1923 (age 107 or 103) Old Zango, Greater Accra Region, British Gold Coast
- Region: West Africa
- Occupation: Imam; Islamic Instructor; Philanthropist
- Website: www.ipasecgh.org

Religious life
- Religion: Islam
- Denomination: Tijaniyyah

Osmanu Nuhu Sharubutu (born 23 April 1919 or 23 April 1923) is a Ghanaian Islamic cleric who currently serves as the Chief Imam of Ghana, as well as a member of the National Peace Council. He was first appointed as the Deputy Regional Chief Imam in 1974. During this period he deputized his cousin, Imam Muhammed Mukhtar Abbas, who succeeded his father. He is also the founder of the Dr. Sheikh Osmanu Nuhu Sharubutu Education Trust Fund (The SONSETFund) and the Islamic Peace and Security Council of Ghana (IPASEC).

== Early life ==
Osmanu Nuhu Sharubutu was born to Nuhu Sharubutu and Hajja Ayishatu Abbass at Accra cow-lane in April 1919. or April 1923.

Sharubutu started his education at home from his father during the day and with his mother at night. Osman was sent to a new learning environment by his father after seeing his devotion for books and knowledge. He was taken to Kumasi, where he was taught by Abdullah Dan Tano. There, he learned Arabic grammar, Arabic literature, Islamic jurisprudence and Hadiths.

After his studies in Kumasi, he devoted his time in teaching the Muslim youth who want to become Islamic thinkers and scholars. Osman continued the pursuit of knowledge even as a teacher himself.

== Appointment ==
In 1974, Sharubutu was appointed the Deputy Regional Chief Imam of Ghana after discussions were held among tribal chiefs, Islamic scholars, and religious personalities.

His appointment was done in consideration of his dedication to teaching Islam. He turned down the offer made to him but he was forced by some Muslim Chiefs to give it a thought.

In 1993, he was appointed the National Chief Imam of Ghana for the Muslim Communities in Ghana.

== Later life ==
Sharubutu reportedly turned 100 on April 23, 2019. On 3 March 2021, he received the COVID-19 vaccine at his residence at Fadama, a suburb in Accra.

In March 2021, Sharubutu praised the chief of Ejura for settling a dispute between the Imam of Ejura and the Zongo Chief. He urged the two groups to unite and advised them to be peaceful in the community.

In May 2021, Godfred Dame stated that Sharubutu plays an important role in ensuring the country is a beacon of human rights in Africa. He was together with Imoro Tanko, Akpene Ziwu and others. He urged the Chiefs and people of Akuapem to embrace peace and bury their differences.

On 16 July 2021, he led the first Jummah prayer in the Ghana National Mosque located in Kanda, a suburb of Accra.

== Awards and recognition ==
In November 2020, an ultra-modern sports complex that was built in his community New Fadama, was named after him. Former president Kufour claimed Osman deserved a Nobel Peace Prize for his contribution to the development of Ghana.

In December, he presented an award for being the 'Best Zongo Minister and Muslim Politician for the year 2019/2020 to Mustapha Hamid who was the Minister for Inner Cities and Zongo Development.

Since 2015, a football tournament for Zongo communities named the Ramadan Cup also the Sheikh Sharubutu Ramadan Cup is organized in his honor. It serves as a way of promoting peace and unity within the Zongo (Muslim) communities in Ghana as its tagline reads ‘Bringing the Zongo Community Together’.

== Personal life ==
Osman was married to Hajia Rahmatu Tahwee Sheikh Sharubutu who died on 27 March 2024.

== Philanthropy ==
In August 2022, Osman constructed and commissioned a mosque and an Islamic school at Ablekuma-Joma in the Greater Accra Region.

== See also ==
- Islam in Ghana
- Wahab Adam
- Afa Seidu
- Afa Ajura
- Native Officer Ali
