= Michael Okyere Baafi =

Ghanaian politician

Hon. Michael Okyere Baafi
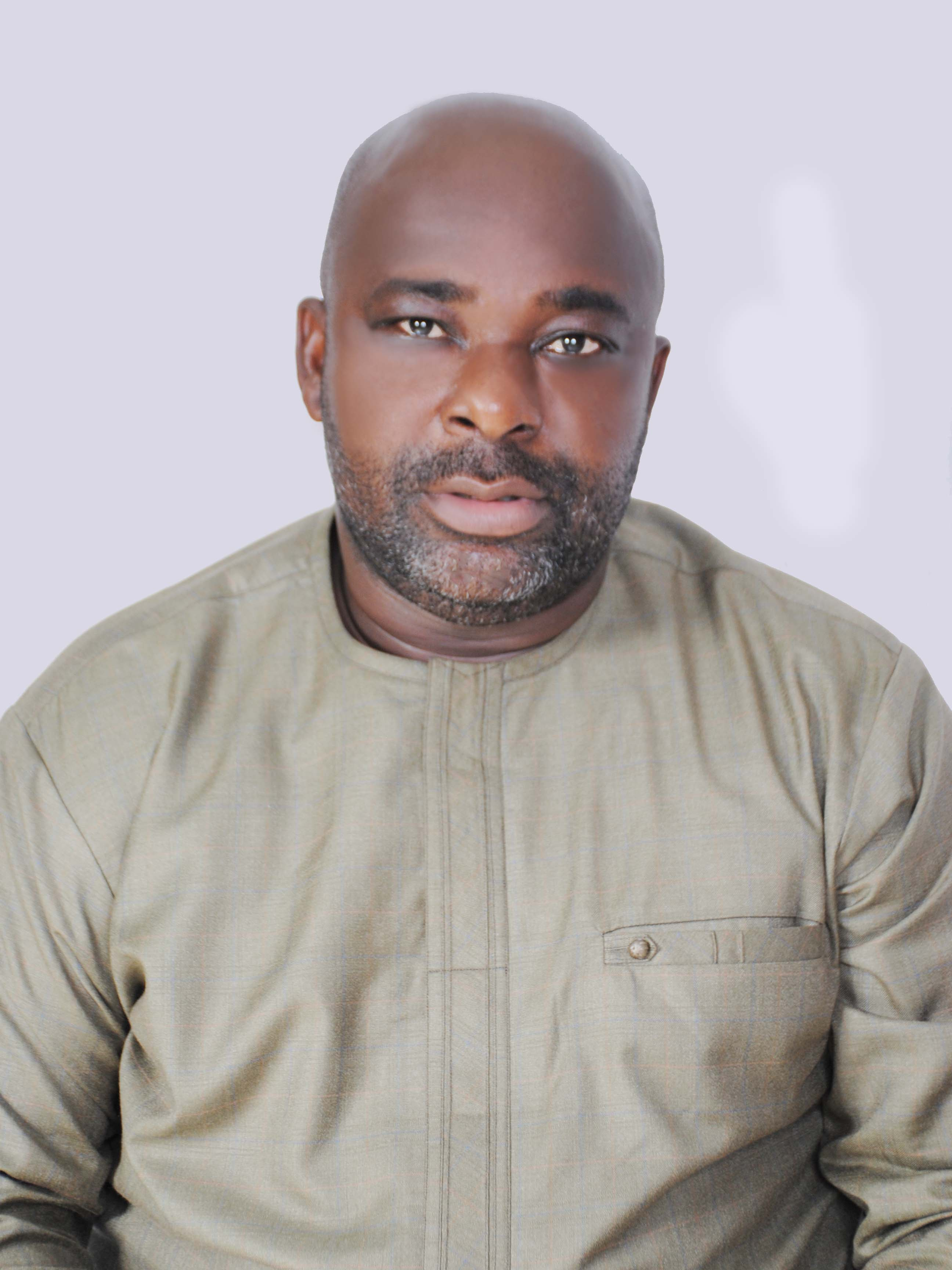

Member of Parliament for New Juaben South (Ghana parliament constituency)
- Incumbent
- Assumed office 7 January 2021
- Preceded by: Mark Assibey-Yeboah

Deputy Minister of Trade and Industry
- In office 2021–2024
- President: Nana Akufo-Addo

Personal details
- Party: New Patriotic Party
- Spouse: Lawyer Mrs. Ewura Esi Okyere Baafi
- Children: 1
- Education: Ghana Secondary School, Koforidua; University of Cape Coast; University of Ghana
- Occupation: Businessman, Politician

Michael Okyere Baafi is a Ghanaian politician and businessman who was appointed Executive Secretary of the Ghana Free Zones Board in 2017. and resigned in 2021 following his election as the Member of parliament for the New Juaben South (Ghana parliament constituency).

== Education ==
An alumnus of Ghana Senior High School, Koforidua, he holds MBA in Marketing and Corporate Strategy from the University of Ghana, and a Bachelor of Education (Honours) degree, University of Cape Coast.

== Work experience ==
Okyere Baafi was the Head of Sales and Marketing at the Phoenix Insurance. He is a member of the Chartered Institute of Marketing, UK and has over 10 years experience in insurance marketing.

== Politics ==
He is a member of the New Patriotic Party and is currently the Chairman of the Finance Committee of the National Youth Wing of the New Patriotic Party (NPP). He is also a member of the Trade and Industry sub-Committee of the Transition team and was the Vice Chairman of the New Juaben South constituency. He is currently the member of parliament for New Juaben South (Ghana parliament constituency) in the Eastern Region.

== Executive Secretary at Ghana Free Zones Board ==
Baafi's appointment took effect on 26 January 2017. Assuming office as the GFZB secretary, he has made a contribution to society by supporting the construction of a modern computer laboratory for the Wesley Methodist Basic School at Koforidua in the Eastern Region and promises serve in the interest of local investors during his term of office.

== Personal life ==
Michael Okyere Baafi hails from Koforidua in the Eastern Region. He is married to lawyer Mrs. Ewura Esi Okyere Baafi and they have a son. Michael Okyere Baafi is a Christian.
