= Rebekah Awuah =

Ghanaian journalist

Rebekah Adwoa Awuah
- Occupations: News anchor, voice actor, media personality
- Years active: 2006–present
- Employer: GBC
- Organization: GTV

Rebekah Adwoa Awuah is a Ghanaian journalist, who has worked as a news anchor on GTV.

== Education ==
Rebekah had her secondary education at Ghana Senior High School in koforidua. She holds a degree in Theater Arts from the University of Ghana, and has also studied law at the Ghana Institute of Management and Public Administration, and Public Management at the University of Wisconsin–Madison.

== Career ==
Rebekah began her career GBC in 2009 as a National Service Personnel, and subsequently became a pioneering anchor and documentary producer for GBC in 2010.

=== Rebekah Awuah Foundation ===
Awuah has established a charitable foundation called the Rebekah Awuah Foundation. The charity has provided hygiene and health products to individuals in need. Previous projects have included giving dental products to children, and COVID-19 PPE to seniors, street vendors, and rural citizens.

== Awards and recognitions ==
In 2013, Rebekah Awuah was nominated in the CNN Multichoice African Journalist Awards for her story "African Drumming & Dance".

Awuah won the Ghana Journalists Association – GJA Arts, Entertainment and Domestic Tourism Award in 2013, 2014 and 2015 and 2016. In 2017, she won the Best Business Tourism Award from the Institute of Financial and Economic Journalists (IFEJ). In 2017, she also won Journalist of the Year in the Women’s Choice Awards Africa.

She was nominated for Energy Reporter of the Year at the Ghana Energy Awards in 2021, and won the award in 2022. In December 2021, she was named a Fellow of the Media Capacity Building Initiative for Reporting on Disability (MCBIRD) for her work on the story "Cloak of Invisibility: PWD’s Making Strides Amid Challenges".

In January 2022, Awuah was elected secretary of the Arts & Tourism Writers Association of Ghana (ATWAG).
