= Ramadan Cup (Ghana) =

Association football cup in Ghana

The Ramadan Cup (also known as the Sheikh Sharubutu Ramadan Cup) is an annual football competition played between May and June depending on the Ramadan calendar of the year within the Muslim Ramadan season.

== History ==
The Ramadan Cup was started in 2015, with six teams competing in the inaugural competition. Ashaiman emerged as the maiden champions after defeating Nima Zongo by 7–6 in a penalty shootout after the match ended goalless in normal regulation time.

The tournament which is an initiative under the auspices of the Ghana National Chief Imam, Sheikh Osman Nuhu Sharubutu serves as a way of promoting peace and unity within the Zongo (Muslim) communities in Ghana as its tagline reads ‘Bringing the Zongo Community Together’.

The tournament saw the introduction of the Video Assistant Referee (VAR) in the 2021 final.

== Format ==
In 2021, the tournament was played between 24-Zongo communities across Ghana.

2021 Teams
Ashaiman	Shukura
Alajo	Tunga
Darkuman	Tudu
Fadama	Kasoa Zongo
Accra	Koforidua Zongo
Accra	Oda Zongo
Nima	Suhum Zongo
Nungua Zongo	Tema Zongo
Madina	Anyaa Zongo
Maamobi	Hohoe Zongo
Nsawam Zongo	Cowlane
Sabon Zongo	Abeka Zongo

== Venues ==
After the Fadama Astroturf also known as the Sheikh Sharubutu Sports Complex at New Fadama, Accra was completed, the field served as the venue for the 2021 tournament.

== Winners & finalists ==
Edition	Year	Winners	Result	Finalists	Notes	Ref
1.	2015	Ashaiman Zongo	0-0 penalties (7-6)^{TAB}	Nima Zongo		
2.	2016	Ashaiman Zongo	3-2	Sabon Zongo		
3.	2017	Madina Zongo	1-1 (3:2) penalties^{TAB}	Tudu Zongo		
4.	2018	Maamobi Zongo	2-1	Madina Zongo		
5.	2019	Nima Zongo	1-0	New Fadama Zongo		
-	2020	Cancelled due to COVID-19 pandemic				
6.	2021	Kasoa Zongo	1-0	Hohoe Zongo		

== Sponsorship ==
The Ramadan Cup was sponsored by Royal Bank from 2015 to 2017, with the bank serving as the tournament's headline sponsor. Since then, the tournament has attracted sponsors including Electroland Ghana Limited (Nasco Electronics), Ashfoam, Adonko Next Level Energy Drink and Holiday Inn Hotel, 5 Star Energy Drink and Afro Arab Group.

Over the years the tournament has been supported by government agencies including the Ministry of Zongo and Inner Cities Development and National Sports Authority.
