= Lydia Aziato =

Ghanaian academic administrator

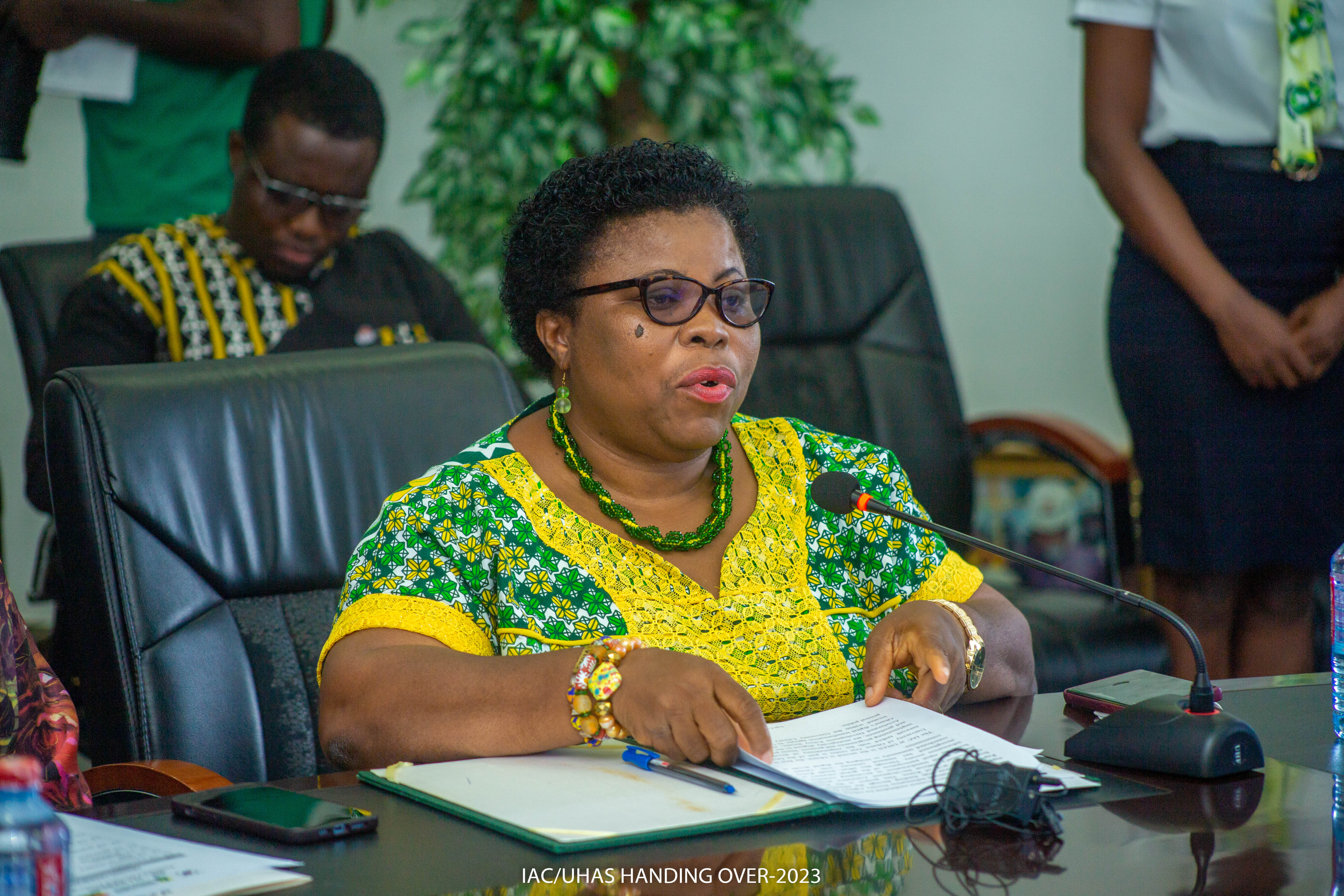
- Education: Ghana Senior High School, Koforidua, University of Ghana, University of the Western Cape, Cross Cancer Institute
- Occupation: Vice Chancellor
- Employer(s): University of Health and Allied Sciences, Ho

Professor Lydia Aziato is a Ghanaian administrator and Vice Chancellor of University of Health and Allied Sciences (UHAS). Professor Lydia Aziato was appointed as the third Vice Chancellor of UHAS, effective August 2022, thereby adding UHAS to the short list of Ghanaian universities with female vice chancellors - the fifth in Ghana.

== Education ==
She had her secondary education at Ghana Senior High School, Koforidua. In 2001 she had her first degree in nursing and psychology, In 2006 she graduated with an MPhil in Nursing from the University of Ghana, she holds a specialty certificate in Oncology Nursing from the Cross Cancer Institute in Edmonton, Canada and completed in 2006 and graduated with a PhD in Nursing from the University of the Western Cape, South Africa in 2013.

== Career ==
Aziato worked as a bedside nurse at the Mamprobi Polyclinic in Accra before joining the University of Ghana, Legon, in 2001 following her first degree. At the University of Ghana, she progressed from a Senior Nurse Technician (2001–2006) to Assistant Lecturer (2006–2008), Lecturer (2008–2014), Senior Lecturer (2014–2017), Associate Professor (2017–2020), and ultimately Professor in 2020.

She served as the Head of the Department for Adult Health at the University of Ghana School of Nursing and Midwifery from 2016 to 2018. She was subsequently appointed Acting Dean (2017–2019) and then Dean (2019–2022), making her the first substantive Dean of the school.

Aziato founded the Research Mentorship Alliance, a non-governmental organization focused on developing the research skills of young scientists in Ghana. She also serves as the President of the Chi Omicron Chapter of Sigma Theta Tau International (STTI), the second-largest nursing organization globally. Within STTI, she has held various roles, including reviewing awards and conference abstracts, and moderating conference presentations.

== Research ==
- Labour pain experiences and perceptions: a qualitative study among post-partum women in Ghana.
- Religious beliefs and practices in pregnancy and labour: an inductive qualitative study among post-partum women in Ghana.
- Facilitators and barriers of herbal medicine use in Accra, Ghana: an inductive exploratory study.
