= Elizabeth Asantewaa =

Ghanaian survivor of a 1960s bomb attack targeting Kwame Nkrumah (c. 1950–2021)

- Born: c. 1950; Gold Coast
- Died: 2 June 2021; Dansoman, Accra, Ghana
- Known for: Surviving a bomb attack directed at Kwame Nkrumah at the Accra Sports Stadium as a schoolgirl

Elizabeth Asantewaa (c. 1950 – 2 June 2021) was a Ghanaian woman who, as a schoolgirl of about 13, was severely injured by a bomb explosion at the Accra Sports Stadium during a public event attended by Ghana's first president, Kwame Nkrumah, and lost a leg as a result. By her own account the explosion took place during the Independence Day celebration on 6 March 1964.

In the decades after Nkrumah's overthrow in the 1966 Ghanaian coup d'état she repeatedly appealed to successive governments for support. Her case was raised on the floor of the Parliament of Ghana a week before her death.

== Background ==
Between 1962 and 1964 Nkrumah survived a series of attempts on his life. On 1 August 1962 a grenade or bomb was thrown at him at Kulungugu, near Bawku in the Upper East Region, as he stopped to receive a bouquet from a schoolchild; Nkrumah was injured and several people, including the child presenting the bouquet, were killed. Further bombs were thrown in Accra in September 1962, and on the evening of 8 January 1963 a bomb was thrown among people dispersing from a rally at the Accra Sports Stadium that Nkrumah had addressed, after the president had left. On 2 January 1964 a police constable fired at Nkrumah at Flagstaff House, killing a security officer.

== Asantewaa's account ==
In interviews given from 2015 onward, Asantewaa said that she was about 13 and had been selected to present a bouquet of flowers to Nkrumah at the Accra Sports Stadium during the Independence Day celebration on 6 March 1964, before a large crowd of students, workers, soldiers and police. She recalled that Nkrumah approached to take the flowers but withdrew from the platform without doing so, and that a series of explosions occurred at the spot where she was standing some minutes after he left. She said she could not tell whether the bomb had been concealed in the bouquet she was holding.

Asantewaa suffered burns and shrapnel wounds to her legs and head. She said that other students were killed in the blast, and that because an ambulance was not ready, soldiers took her to the 37 Military Hospital in a private vehicle.

== Treatment and Nkrumah's patronage ==
According to Asantewaa, she remained at the 37 Military Hospital for about two years before doctors concluded that her condition was beyond their capacity and she was flown to the United Kingdom for further treatment. She said Nkrumah sponsored her treatment in London, where she was fitted with a prosthetic leg.

She said that Nkrumah visited her frequently in hospital, sometimes with his wife Fathia Nkrumah, and wept at her bedside, and that he told her she had saved his life and promised that the state would provide for her needs for the rest of her life.

== Later life ==
After Nkrumah was overthrown in February 1966, the support she had received ended. According to her family, the only further assistance she received from the state was a replacement prosthetic leg provided under the government of General Ignatius Kutu Acheampong in the 1970s.

Asantewaa lived for many years in Dansoman, a suburb of Accra. She married and had two children; her husband and both children predeceased her. In her final years she was cared for by a nephew whom she had raised. By 2020 she had been bedridden for more than two years, was in a wheelchair with an amputated limb, and reported difficulty affording food and medication. Her rent had for a period been paid by the Dansoman branch of the Assemblies of God church she attended, and she faced eviction when that support lapsed.

== Public appeals ==
Asantewaa gave a number of media interviews over the last years of her life describing her circumstances and appealing for state support. In March 2015 MyJoyOnline reported that she was living with an amputated limb and a deteriorating remaining leg and was appealing to the president for help. In April 2015 she spoke to Accra-based Starr FM, saying she had received no help from any government since Nkrumah's fall. In March 2019 members of the ABLE Initiative, including the comedian Ajeezay, visited her at her home in Dansoman and presented her with gifts.

On 8 November 2020 she appeared on the Citi TV programme Upside Down, where she asked to meet President Nana Akufo-Addo and appealed for help with accommodation and medical bills. The interview circulated widely on social media. In January 2021 a group of alumni of Achimota School and other donors raised more than GH₵5,000 for her needs after seeing the interview.

On 26 May 2021 Rockson-Nelson Dafeamekpor, the Member of Parliament for South Dayi, made a statement on the floor of Parliament calling on the state to take responsibility for her care, describing her as living in severe pain and deprivation and neglected since Nkrumah's overthrow.

== Death ==
Asantewaa died on 2 June 2021, one week after the parliamentary statement. The civil-society campaigner Mensah Thompson called for the state to give her a state burial. On 22 June 2021 members of her family, accompanied by Dafeamekpor and the Assin South MP John Ntim Fordjour, called on the Speaker of Parliament, Alban Bagbin, to inform him of her death and of the burial arrangements.

== Conflicting accounts of the incident ==
Some reports, including a 2015 Graphic Online article and the May 2021 parliamentary statement, describe Asantewaa as a victim of the Kulungugu attack of 1962. Contemporary accounts of Kulungugu, including the memoir of Nkrumah's minister Tawia Adamafio, state that the child presenting the bouquet there was killed. Asantewaa's own account, and most reporting on her case, place her injury at the Accra Sports Stadium.
