= Kwabena Baah-Duodu =

Ghanaian diplomat (born 1949)

Permanent Representative of Ghana to the United Nation Offices in Geneva
- In office 2006–2009
- President: John Kufuor

Personal details
- Born: Kwabena Baah-Duodu; 26 February 1949 (age 77) Gold Coast
- Education: Ghana Senior High School, Koforidua
- Alma mater: University of Ghana (MPA); University of Nairobi (Dip.)
- Occupation: Diplomat; Civil Servant

Kwabena Baah-Duodu (born 26 February 1949) is a Ghanaian diplomat. He served as Ghana's Permanent Representative to United Nations Offices in Geneva from 2006 to 2009 and as Ghana's Ambassador to Switzerland and Austria from 2006 to 2008.

== Early life ==
Kwabena Baah Duodu was born on 26 February 1949 in Dwenase in the Eastern Region of Ghana. He was educated at Ghana Senior High School, Koforidua and proceeded to the University of Ghana where he received a B. A. in Sociology in 1974. He obtained a master's degree in Public Administration in 1977 from the University of Ghana. He received a Diploma in International Relations from the University of Nairobi in 1981 after a year's study.

== Career ==
Baah-Duodu was employed by the Ministry of Foreign Affairs in 1977. From 1977 to 1985, he served in various departments and offices of the ministry in Accra. In December 1985, Baah-Duodu was assigned to Ghana's Permanent Mission to the United Nations at Geneva. He served as First Secretary and later as Counsellor/Head of Chancery until 1989. He was a staff of Ghana's Diplomatic Mission in India from 1993 to 1997. In November 1998, Baah-Duodu opened the Ghana Embassy in the Republic of Korea and served as Chargé d'Affaires until August 2001. He was made Deputy High Commissioner to the United Kingdom from August 2001 to January 2005. He returned to the Ministry of Foreign Affairs in Accra where he took up post as Director of the Africa and African Union Bureau of the Ministry from January 2005 to March 2006. Baah-Duodu was then promoted to Supervising Director of Administration at the Ministry of Foreign Affairs before subsequently given an appointment as Ambassador of Ghana to Switzerland and Austria from 2006 and 2008 and Permanent Representative to the European Offices of the UN and other International Organizations in the two countries from 2006 to 2009.

In 2009, he retired from the Ghana Foreign Service and joined the United Nations Conference on Trade and Development (UNCTAD) as a Senior Adviser. He exited this role at the UNCTAD in 2011 and later returned to UNCTAD briefly to be Chef du Cabinet of the Secretary-General. In 2012, he took up a role at the University of Ghana as a Part-time Diplomat-in-Residence at the Legon Centre for International Affairs and Diplomacy from November 2012 to January 2016 and as full-time Diplomat-in-Residence from February 2016.
