= New Juaben South =

Constituency in Ghana

- constituency for the Parliament of Ghana
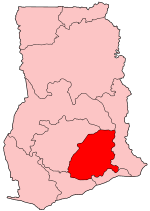
- District: New-Juaben Municipal District
- Region: Eastern Region of Ghana

Current constituency
- Created: 2004
- Party: New Patriotic Party
- MP: Michael Okyere Baafi

The New Juaben South constituency is in the Eastern region of Ghana. It was created prior to the 2004 Ghanaian general election. The current member of Parliament for the constituency is Michael Okyere Baafi of the New Patriotic Party. He was first elected in the 2020 Ghanaian general election.

== Members of Parliament ==
First elected	Member	Party
Created 2004
2004	Yaw Barimah	New Patriotic Party
2008	Beatrice Bernice Boateng	New Patriotic Party
2012	Mark Assibey-Yeboah	New Patriotic Party
2016	Mark Assibey-Yeboah	New Patriotic Party
2020	Michael Okyere Baafi	New Patriotic Party
2024	Michael Okyere Baafi	New Patriotic Party

Michael Okyere Baafi was elected on the ticket of the New Patriotic Party (NPP) in the 2020 Ghanaian general election where he won by a majority of 47,862. He succeeded Mark Assibey-Yeboah who had represented the constituency in the 4th Republican parliament on the ticket of the New Patriotic Party (NPP). He was the former head of Free Zone Ghana.

== See also ==
- List of Ghana Parliament constituencies
