= Koo Ntakra =

Ghanaian musician

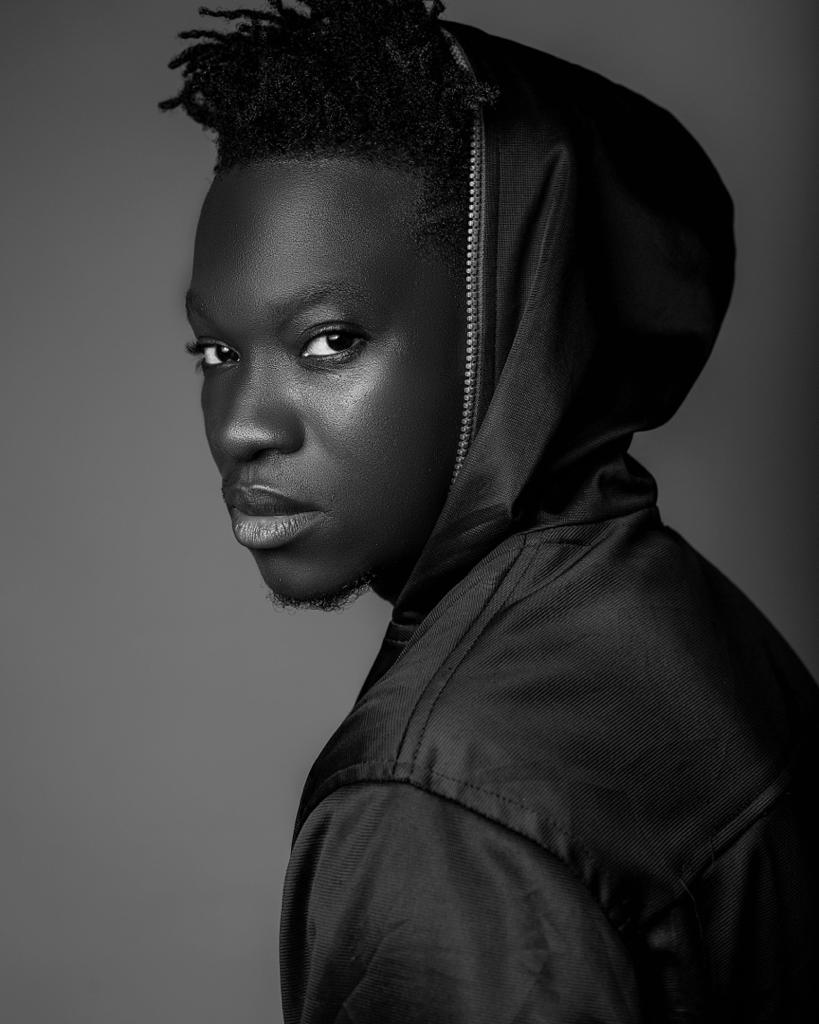

Background information
- Also known as: Koo Ntakra
- Born: Isaac Akuaba Kuma Akuffo; 21 February; Jumapo, Koforidua
- Genres: Rap; Hiplife
- Occupations: Rapper, Singer
- Years active: 2014 – present
- Label: KN Records

Isaac Akuffo (born 21 February 1992), who goes by the stage name Koo Ntakra, is a hiplife and hip hop artist from Ghana who raps in his native language of Akuapem. He was signed to Bullhaus Entertainment in 2014 but currently on his own label KN Records. He won MTN Hitmaker in 2013 and was also nominated at Unsung Category in the Ghana Music Awards. He also won Rap Act of the year and Artist of the Year at Eastern Music Awards 2017. He was featured on Sarkodie's Trumpet collaboration in 2017.

== Music career ==
Koo Ntakra was a contestant in the season 2 of the reality competition show MTN Hitmaker in Ghana in 2013, where he emerged as the overall winner. He was signed shortly afterwards to Bullhaus Entertainment and has gone on to release several singles.His First Single Banku was a Smash hit of his first album Akuaba He later released "Wurewurafuo" which he featured Pope Skinny which gained him more attention in Ghana in 2015. He released his first album - Akuaba Album in 2014 and the second studio album King of Kofcity was released in 2017. He has performed at Legends & Legacy ball, BBnZ Afrobeat Big Weekend, Ghana Meets Naija, Saminifest and others.

== Discography ==
=== Singles ===
- Wurewurafo
- Kondem
- Rap Lesson
- Oman Ghana
- Ohemaa ft Eno Barony
- Kill Me Shy ft Gachios
- Twa Di ft Mr Bergs
- Girls ft Yaa Pono
- Yeeba
- Gbelemi
- Bam
- Berma
- KofCity Boys
- Dream
- Banku
- Mmoborowa
- rap lessons

=== Albums ===
- Akuaba - 2014
- King of Kofcity (KOK) - 2017

== Awards and nominations ==
Year	Organization	Award	Nominated work	Result	Ref
2015	Vodafone Ghana Music Awards	Unsung Category	Himself	Nominated	
2015	Africa Youth Choice Awards	Most Promising Act	Himself	Nominated	
2017	Eastern Music Awards	Rap act of the Year	Himself	Won	
2017	Eastern Music Awards	Artist of the Year	Himself	Won	
