= Abeiku Santana =

Ghanaian media personality and entrepreneur

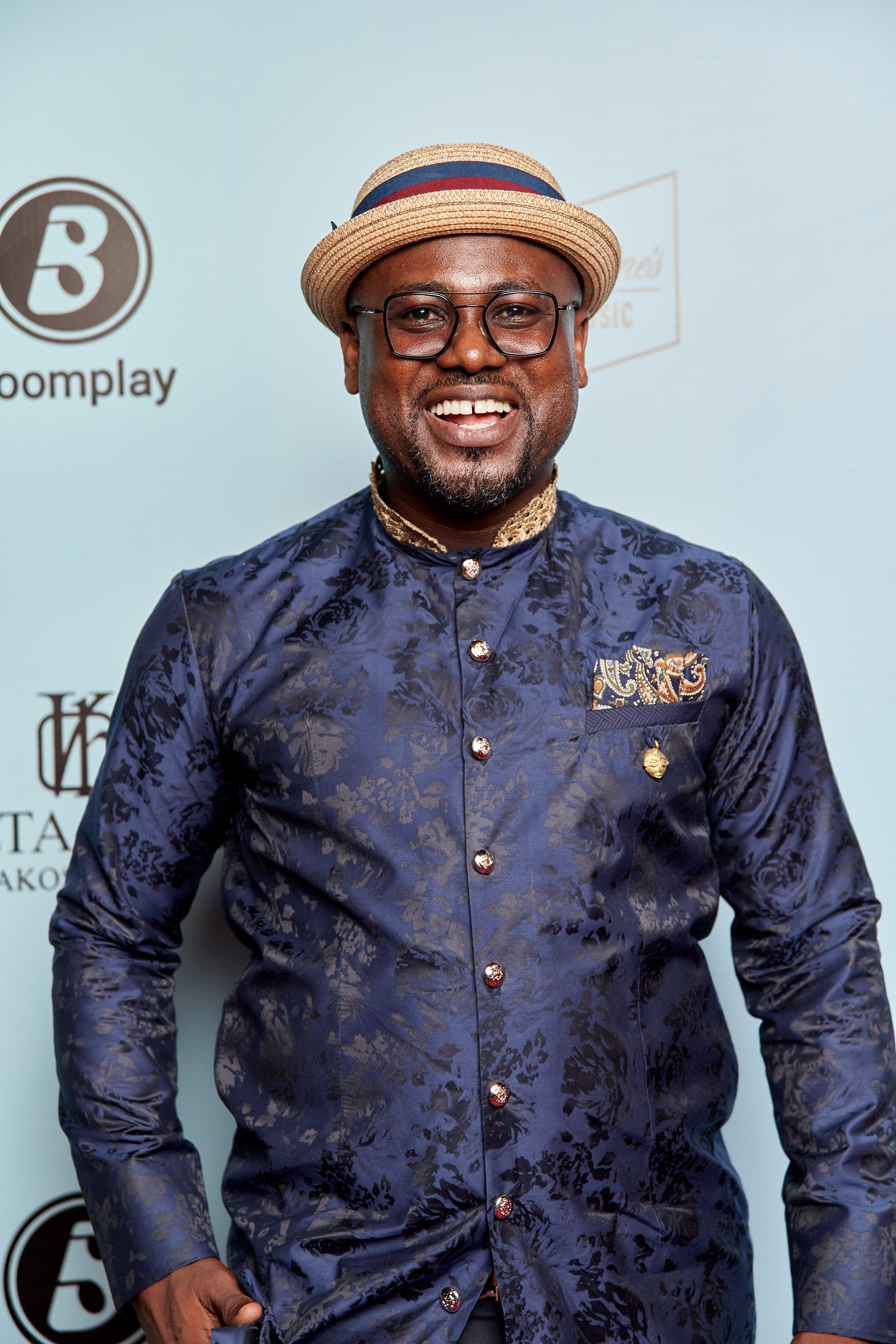
- Born: Gilbert Abeiku Aggrey Santana; 16 February 1977 (age 49)
- Education: Ghana National College; Ghana Senior High School, Koforidua; University of Ghana Business School; University of Cape Coast; Ghana Institute of Management and Public Administration; Ghana Institute of Journalism
- Occupations: Media personality Entrepreneur
- Years active: 1991
- Title: Chief Executive Officer (CEO) KAYA TOURS
- Spouse: Genevieve Benyiwah Aggrey
- Awards: Special Recognition Award for Tourism Marketing and Promotion - Exclusive Men of the Year Africa Awards (EMY Award) RTP Personality Of The Year at the 2021.

Gilbert Abeiku Aggrey Santana (born 16 February 1977), also known as Abeiku Santana, is a Ghanaian media personality, entrepreneur and politician. He is also the CEO of Kaya Tours Ghana Limited a Ghanaian travel company. President John Mahama appointed him Deputy Chief Executive Officer of the Ghana Tourism Authority late in February 2025.

== Early life and education ==
Santana was born in Koforidua in the Eastern Region of Ghana. He started his basic education in Koforidua at Nana Kwaku Boateng Experimental School and he later attended Ghana National College, Cape Coast, for his Ordinary Level certificate. He then attended Ghana Senior High School, Koforidua for his Advanced level Certificate.

He holds master's degree in Tourism Management from the University of Cape Coast, a Post Graduate in Public Administration from Ghana Institute of Management and Public Administration, Associate in Legal Studies and Litigation from New York Paralegal School, Advance Certificate in Public Relations and Advertising from Ghana Institute of Journalism. Santana is currently pursuing another master's degree at the University of Ghana Business School (UGBS).

== Career ==
Santana started his career in media as Assistant Programs Manager at Radio Z in Koforidua. He later moved to Radio Mercury where he worked as a Deputy Programs Manager from 1991 to 2001. From 2001 to 2002, he served as a radio drive time host for Ash FM 101.1 in Kumasi.

In 2002, he moved to the Multimedia Broadcasting Group as a Radio host for Adom fm' s drive time show(Ofie kwan so) and later rose to become Head of Music programs and Events Promotion Coordinator until he left in 2010 to join the Despite Media Group's Okay FM.

Santana was appointed as an ambassador for the COVID-19 National Trust Fund.

=== Tourism ===
Santana is the CEO and founder of Kaya Tours Ghana Limited where he was later named as a Tourism Ambassador for Ghana in 2017.

A number of African tourism conferences, including as the Africa Tourism Leadership Forum in Namibia and the 8th Swahili International Tourism Expo in Tanzania, have sent invitations to the savvy radio and television broadcaster to attend in 2024.

=== Politics ===
In 2015, Abeiku was poised to represent the National Democratic Congress (Ghana) in the 2016 Ghanaian general election as the parliamentary candidate for the Mfantseman in the Central Region (Ghana)

In 2025, he was appointed as acting deputy director of the Ghana Tourism Authority by John Mahama.

== Awards ==
- Abeiku Santana won the RTP Personality Of The Year at the 2021 Radio and Television Personality Awards.
- At the glitzy event held at the Eko Hotels Convention Center in Lagos, Nigeria, Abeiku Santana, the manager and director of Kaya Tours, received recognition for his tireless efforts to promote travel throughout the continent, not only in Ghana.
- He was nominated for the PAV Ansah Communicator Award in the 2019 EMY Awards in Ghana.
- He won Special Recognition Award for Tourism Marketing and Promotion at the EMY Awards in 2020 for his contribution to tourism in Ghana.

== Personal life ==
Abeiku Santana is married to Genevieve Benyiwah Aggrey after divorcing his first wife.
