= John Owusu Gyapong =

Ghanaian epidemiologist and academic administrator

Professor John Owusu Gyapong
- Education: London School of Hygiene and Tropical Medicine, University of London PhD, Epidemiology 1994 – 1997 London School of Hygiene and Tropical Medicine, University of London MSc, Public Health 1992 – 1993 Kwame Nkrumah' University of Science and Technology, Kumasi BSc.; MB ChB, Medicine 1980 – 1987
- Occupations: Vice Chancellor of the University of Health and Allied Sciences
- Spouse: Professor (Mrs) Margaret Gyapong

Professor John Owusu Gyapong is a Ghanaian Professor of Epidemiology. He was the Vice Chancellor of the University of Health and Allied Sciences, in Ho, Ghana, from 2016 to 2022. He is currently the Secretary-General of the African Research Universities Alliance (ARUA).

== Education ==
Gyapong obtained an MB ChB degree from Kwame Nkrumah University of Science and Technology in 1987. He undertook his postgraduate studies at the London School of Hygiene and Tropical Medicine, University of London, England where he earned an MSc in public health in developing countries in 1993, and later a Ph.D. in Epidemiology in 1997.

== Career ==
Before assuming the office of Secretary-General of the African Research Universities Alliance on 1 August 2024, he was for six years the Vice Chancellor of the University of Health and Allied Sciences (2016–2022). He had earlier served as the Pro-Vice-Chancellor for Research, Innovation and Development at the University of Ghana for five years (2011–2016). He also worked in various capacities at the Ghana Health Service and was chairman of the Food and Drugs Authority Clinical Trials Technical Committee. Outside the university, Gyapong has had a wide and varied international experience and exposure.

Gyapong has provided expertise as a technical advisor to several national and international organisations and institutions, some of which he has chaired. These include: The World Bank; World Health Organisation and the European and Developing Countries Clinical Trials Partnership (EDCTP).These several roles over the last two decades culminated in his appointment as a Commissioner to the Lancet-University of Oslo Commission on the Global Governance for Health, an independent academic research initiative managed in collaboration with the Harvard Global Health Institute.

== Research interests ==
Gyapong's main area of research is infectious disease epidemiology, especially lymphatic filariasis, malaria, and other neglected tropical diseases. He has been involved in several large scale epidemiological field trials in Ghana including the Ghana on Vitamin A Supplementation, Malaria intervention studies, and Social and economic impact of lymphatic filariasis. For over 10 years he was Director for Research and Development of the Ghana Health Service where he was responsible for health systems research. He has received at least 5 million dollars of research grants as of 2016.

Before assuming responsibility as Pro-Vice Chancellor he was the Vice-Dean and Professor in Epidemiology and Disease Control at the School of Public Health of the University of Ghana, and an adjunct professor of International Health at Georgetown University in Washington, D.C. He serves on several international research review committees and boards.

== Affiliations ==
- Fellow, Royal Society of Tropical Medicine and Hygiene
- Fellow, American Society of Tropical Medicine and Hygiene
- Fellow, Ghana College of Physicians and Surgeons
- Fellow, Ghana Academy of Arts and Sciences
- Fellow, Faculty of Public Health, Royal College of Physicians
