= Beatrice Boateng =

Ghanaian politician

Beatrice Bernice Boateng

Member of Parliament for New Juaben South
- In office 7 January 2009 – 6 January 2013

Personal details
- Born: Beatrice Bernice Boateng; 19 August 1951 (age 75) Koforidua, Eastern Region, Ghana
- Party: New Patriotic Party
- Children: 3
- Education: University of Edinburgh (MSc in Education, 2001)
- Occupation: Politician; Educationist
- Profession: Regional Manager, Presbyterian Schools

Beatrice Bernice Boateng is a Ghanaian politician and a member of the 5th parliament of the 4th republic of Ghana, as Member of Parliament for New Juaben South Constituency in the Eastern Region of Ghana.

== Early life and education ==
Boateng was born on 19 August 1951 in Koforidua in the Eastern Region of Ghana. She attended the University of Edinburgh, Scotland in 2001 and holds a Master of Science degree in education.

== Career ==
She is an educationist and has been the Regional Manager of the Presbyterian schools in the Greater Accra Region.

== Politics ==
She was first elected into parliament on the ticket of NPP during the December 2008 general elections as Member of Parliament for New Juaben South constituency. Beatrice obtained 34,409 votes representing 61.3% out of the 56,102 valid votes cast. She however lost her party's parliamentary primaries in 2012 and therefore could not represent the party in the 2012 election.

== Personal life ==
She is a widow with three children. She is a Presbyterian.
