= University of Health and Allied Sciences =

Public university in Ho, Ghana

Coordinates: 6.603266°N 0.475854°E

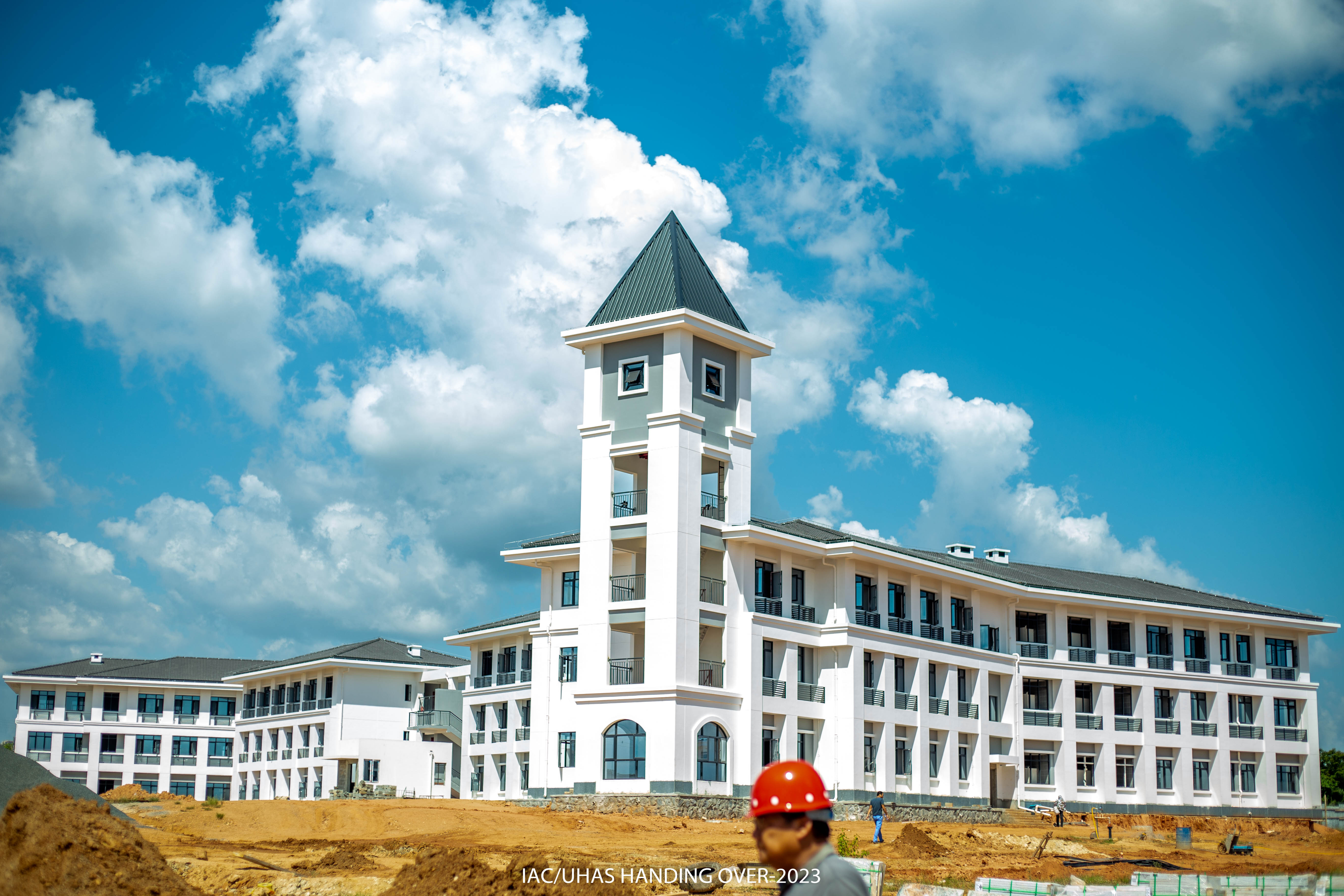
- Motto: Health for Development
- Type: Public
- Established: 2011; 15 years ago
- Chairman: Jones Victor Mawulorm Dotse
- Vice-Chancellor: Prof. Lydia Aziato
- Location: Ho, Volta Region, Ghana
- Campus: Ho and Hohoe
- Website: uhas.edu.gh

The University of Health and Allied Sciences (UHAS) is a public university located at Ho in the Volta Region of Ghana. UHAS is one of the youngest public universities in Ghana. Its operation started in September 2012, when the first batch of 154 students were admitted.

== History ==
The university was established by an Act of Parliament (Act 828), which received presidential approval in December 2011. It however, started admitting students in 2012. The university is devoted to teaching, research, and service in the health sciences.

The university was formed with an Interim University Council that governs the affairs of the school, chaired by professor Kofi Anyidoho. The Foundation Vice-Chancellor was Professor Fred Newton Binka, who served from March 2012 to July 2016. In August 2017, a new council was inaugurated with Justice Jones Victor Mawulorm Dotse as the chairman. Other members of the council are professor John Owusu Gyapong (Vice-Chancellor, UHAS); professor Victor Gadzekpo (Member), Sylvia Ayeley Deganus (Member), Nana Owusu-Afari (Member), Richard K. Adjei (Member), Mark Amexo (Member), Emmanuel Newman(NCTE), Courage Meteku (Representative of CHASS), professor Harry Kwami Tagbor (representative of Convocation-professorial), Yaa Amankwaa Opuni (representative of Convocation-professorial), Kwesi Aseredum Hagan (Representative of FUSSAG), Joshua Gadasu, (representative of TEWU), Francis Zotor (representative of UTAG), and Derrick Asare (representative of SRC).

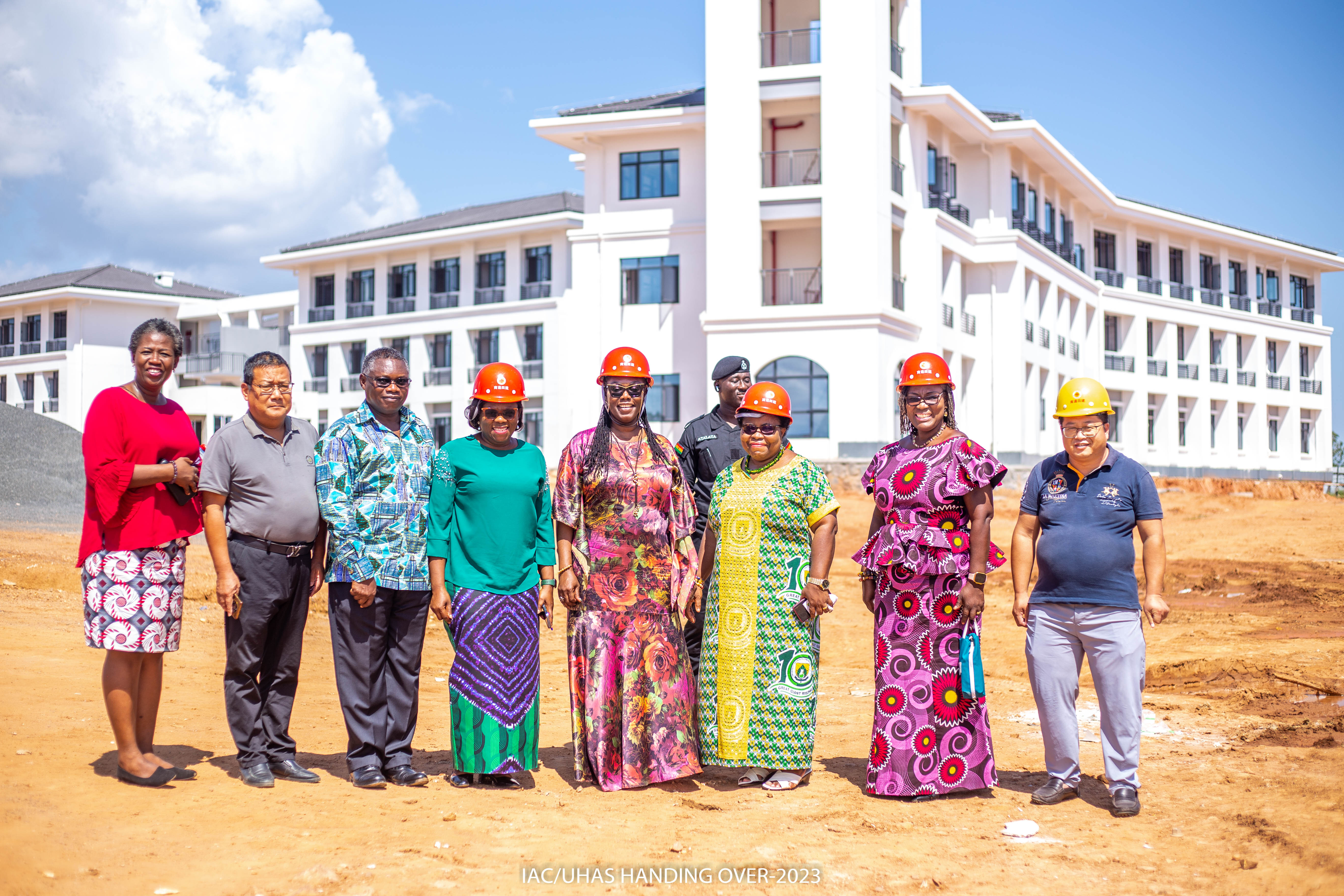
UHAS building project

== Campuses ==
The university has two main campuses:

- Ho campus - main and central administrative campus
1. Perm site: Phase 1 and Phase 2
2. Dave
3. Trafalgar
- Hohoe campus where the School of Public Health is located

== Office of the Vice-Chancellor ==
Professor Lydia Aziato is the current Vice-Chancellor of the University of Health and Allied Sciences. In a special meeting held on June 3, 2022, the Governing Council of the University of Health and Allied Sciences approved the appointment of Prof. Aziato as the new Vice-Chancellor. Effective August 1, 2022, Prof. Aziato assumes the prestigious position, becoming the first woman and a nurse to hold the role of Vice-Chancellor in the history of the University Health and Allied Sciences.

=== History of the Office ===
- Professor Lydia Aziato(2022–Present) Vice-Chancellor
- Professor John Owusu Gyapong (2016-2022) Vice-Chancellor
- Professor Fred Newton Binka (2012-2016), founding Vice-Chancellor

== Schools and institutes ==
The University of Health and Allied Sciences comprises nine Schools and three Institutes:

=== Schools ===
- School of Basic and Biomedical Sciences (SBBS).
- School of Allied Health Sciences (SAHS).
- School of Nursing and Midwifery (SONAM).
- Fred Newton Binka School of Public Health
- School of Pharmacy (SOP).
- School of Medicine. (SOM)
- School of Sports and Exercise Medicine (SEM).
- School of Graduate Studies
- UHAS Basic School.

=== Institutes ===
Institute of Health Research has the following centres:

- Centre for Health Policy and Implementation Research
- Centre for Non-Communicable Diseases Research
- Centre for Malaria Research
- Centre for Neglected Tropical Diseases Research

The Institute of Traditional and Alternative Medicine (ITAM), UHAS is composed of six departments, namely:

- Department of Traditional Medicine
- Department of Complementary & Alternative Medicines
- Department of Natural Products Sourcing
- Department of Education and Advocacy
- Clinical Department
- Drug Production Department

Institute Of Medical Education has the following centres:

- Center for Health Policy and Implementation Research (CHPIR)
- Center for Malaria Research (CMR)
- Center for Neglected Tropical Diseases Research (CNTDR)
- Center for Non-communicable Diseases Research (CNCDR)

Directorates

- Academic Affairs
- Finance
- Human Resources
- Information Communication Technology
- Internal Audit
- International Programmes
- Library
- Public Affairs
- Quality Assurance
- Works & Physical Development

== Research Ethics Committee ==
The university has a Research Ethics Committee (REC), that is responsible for the oversight of responsibilities with reviewing and approving all research planned to be conducted in the university's facilities and/or involve the staff or students of the university. The goal of the REC is to protect the rights and welfare of human participants in research studies.

The REC is made up of seven (7) Scientists/Academics and 8 Non-scientists; including A lawyer, Journalist, Religious Body Representing the larger Community, Sociologist, Educationist, Traditional leader, Public Health Expert and a Medical Doctor

The officers of the REC include the chair, Vice Chair and the Administrator.

CUT OFF POINTS

SCHOOL OF NURSING AND MIDWIFERY (SONAM)

Bachelor of Nursing	08*/10**
Bachelor of Midwifery	08*/10**
Bachelor of Public Health Nursing	10*/12**
Bachelor of Health Administration	**

SCHOOL OF MEDICINE (SOM)

Medical Degree (MBChB)	08
Bachelor of Physician Assistantship	09
Bachelor of Dental Surgery	08

SCHOOL OF PHARMACY (SOP)

Doctor of Pharmacy	08

SCHOOL OF ALLIED HEALTH SCIENCES

Doctor of Medical Laboratory Sciences	12
Bachelor of Dietetics	14
Bachelor of Physiotherapy	16
Bachelor of Diagnostic Imaging	14
Bachelor of Speech, Language and Hearing Sciences	16
Bachelor of Orthotics & Prosthetics	17

SCHOOL OF BASIC AND BIOMEDICAL SCIENCES (SBBS)

Bachelor of Biochemistry and Molecular Biology	18

SCHOOL OF PUBLIC HEALTH (SPH)

Bachelor of Public Health (Disease Control)	15
Bachelor of Public Health (Health Information)	17
Bachelor of Public Health (Health Promotion)	17
Bachelor of Public Health (Nutrition)	15
Bachelor of Public Health (Mental Health)	*
Public Health (Environmental Health)	*

SCHOOL OF SPORTS AND EXERCISE MEDICINE(SSEM)

Bachelor of Sports and Exercise Medical Sciences	22

Key: * Non – Science Students, ** Science Students

== Postgraduate studies ==
- Department Of Medical Laboratory Sciences Graduate Programmes

A. M.PHIL IN MEDICAL LABORATORY SCIENCES PROGRAMME with options in:

a. Chemical Pathology

b. Haematology and Transfusion Science

c. Histopathology and Cytopathology

d. Immunology/Vaccinology

e. Microbiology (Parasitology, Bacteriology, Virology, Mycology)

B. Ph.D IN MEDICAL LABORATORY SCIENCES PROGRAMME with options

a. Chemical Pathology

b. Histopathology

c. Microbiology

- SCHOOL OF BASIC AND BIOMEDICAL SCIENCES
1. Master Of Biomedical Science, Biomedical Science
2. MASTER OF PHILOSOPHY (MPHIL), BIOMEDICAL SCIENCE
3. DOCTOR OF PHILOSOPHY (PHD), BIOMEDICAL SCIENCE

C. SCHOOL OF PUBLIC HEALTH

1. MASTER OF PHILOSOPHY (M.Phil.) IN APPLIED EPIDEMIOLOGY (REGULAR) (Ghanaian and International)
2. MASTER OF PUBLIC HEALTH (MPH) (Ghanaian and International)
3. DOCTOR OF PHILOSOPHY (PHD IN PUBLIC HEALTH) – FULL-TIME (Ghanaian and International)

D. SCHOOL OF NURSING AND MIDWIFERY

1. MPhil Nursing Studies and MPhil Midwifery

D. SCHOOL OF PHARMACY

i) Doctor of Philosophy (Pharmacology)

ii) Doctor of Philosophy (Toxicology)

iii) Doctor of Philosophy (Pharmacognosy)

iv) Doctor of Philosophy (Pharmaceutical Chemistry)

Requirements

A Master's degree (with research) or its equivalent in Pharmacology, Toxicology, Pharmacognosy, Pharmaceutical Chemistry, Biochemistry, Biomedical Sciences, Molecular and Cell Biology, or any other relevant field of study.

i. Master of Philosophy (Pharmacology)

ii. Master of Philosophy (Toxicology)

iii. Master of Philosophy (Pharmacognosy)

iv. Master of Philosophy (Pharmaceutical Chemistry)

v. Master of Science (Pharmaceutical Chemistry)

Requirements

A first degree with a minimum of Second-Class Lower division or equivalent in Pharmacology, Biochemistry, Biomedical Sciences, Molecular and Cell Biology, Toxicology, Pharmacy (BPharm/PharmD) or any other relevant field of study.

== Ranks ==
The University of Health and Allied Sciences (UHAS) was ranked second in Ghana and 36th in Africa in the World Scientist and University Rankings 2021 by AD Scientific Index, beating out KNUST, UCC, and GIMPA, among other universities.

UHAS achieved the highest ranking among Ghanaian universities in the Times Higher Education Impact Rankings for the SDG-3 category, recognizing their outstanding efforts in promoting good health and well-being in the 2022.

== See also ==
- List of universities in Ghana
