= Bame, Ghana =

Bame
- Village
- Location within Ghana
- Coordinates: 06°40′18.7″N 0°21′14.2″E
- Country: Ghana
- Region: Volta Region
- Districts: Ho West District

Government
  - District Chief Executive: Ernest Victor Apau
  - Bame Fia (King of Bame): Togbe Atia Yao VIII
- Elevation: 252 m (827 ft)
- Time zone: GMT
  - Summer (DST): GMT
- Ghana Post GPS: VI-1186

Bame is a village in the Ho West District of the Volta Region of Ghana.

== Location ==
Bame is located just before the junction of one of the main roads running north to south in the region. After Bame, one branch goes left and over the Akwapim Togo mountain range to Kpeve where one could go south to the Peki Traditional Area or northwards towards Kpandu and Hohoe.

== Neighbours ==
Its nearest neighbour is Wegbe Kpalime which is about a kilometre south east of Bame. Other towns beyond Bame in a southwesterly direction are Avenui, Nkwanta, Anyirawasi and Tsito. Sokode-Etoe is 12.3 kilometres (7.6 mi) to the south east. To the east are Ho the Volta Regional capital, Matse, and Akoefe. Places towards the north east are Kpale, Hlefi, Anfoeta, Dzolokpuita, the district capital, about 16 kilometres (9.9 mi) away and Kpedze. The Akwapim Togo mountain range forms the immediate western border of Bame. Over on the other side of the mountains to the west are Kpeve, capital of the South Dayi District. Further to the west is the Volta Lake. Places to the north include Have Etoe, Anfoega and Kpandu.

== People ==
The indigenous people of Bame are the Ewe. Bame is one of the villages that make up the Awudome Traditional Area.

== Administration ==
The head of the Ho West District is the Chief Executive who is appointed by the President of Ghana. The current head since January 2017 is Ernest Victor Apau. The King (Fia) of Bame is currently Togbe Atia Yao VIII.

== External links and sources ==
- South Dayi District Official website
