= Kpale Kpalime =

- Village
- Location within Ghana
- Coordinates: 06°42′14″N 00°21′49″E
- Country: Ghana
- Region: Volta Region
- District: Ho West District
- Traditional Area: Kpalime Traditional Area

Government
  - District Chief Executive: Ernest Victor Apau
  - Kpalime Traditional Area: Togbega Asio XI
- Time zone: GMT
  - Summer (DST): GMT

Kpale is a village located in the Ho West District of the Volta Region of Ghana. It is one of the towns of the Kpalime Traditional Area.

== Location ==
Kpale is located to the north of Bame. To the north are Hlefi and Anfoeta Gbogame. Kpale lies on the eastern edge of the Akwapim-Togo mountains. Kpeve, the capital of the South Dayi District is to the southwest of Kpale but over on the west of the Akwapim Togo mountain range. It is the biggest town close to Kpale.

== History ==
The people of the Kpalime Traditional Area are believed to have migrated to their present locations from Notsie in Togo. This was to escape the tyranny of Togbe Agorkorli, the king of Notsie. One large group migrated to the coast. The second group includes the people of Wegbe, Kpeve and Klefe among others who settled in the Volta midlands.

== People ==
The indigenous population are the Ewe. To Kpalime is one of the villages in the Kpalime Traditional Area. They are related to the other Kpalime towns which include Wegbe Kpalime, To Kpalime, Todome, Tsatee, Hiama, Tongor Kaira and Kpalime Duga. Kpalime Duga is the main village of the Kpalime Traditional Area.

The inhabitants of Wegbe celebrate the annual Kpalikpakpaza or Kpalikpakpa festival around December each year. This is to commemorate the valour of their ancestors during their migration from Notsie in Togo. This festival was only instituted in 1997. The main celebration rotates between the various villages annually. The 17th festival in November 2012 was celebrated in Kaira. To Kpalime is ruled by its own chief. As it is in the Kpalime Traditional Area, it also comes under the paramount chief of the area, Togbega Atigbladza Agbi Yao VIII who is also the chief of Kpalime Duga.

== See also ==
- Kpalime Traditional Area
- Ho West District
- Ho West (Ghana parliament constituency)

== External links and sources ==
- South Dayi District Official website
- To Kpalime
