= Tongor Kaira =

Tongor Kaira (Tɔngɔ Kaira)
- Village
- Location within Ghana
- Coordinates: 06°33′42″N 00°15′06″E
- Country: Ghana
- Region: Volta Region
- District: South Dayi District

Government
  - District Chief Executive: Kafui Bekui (NDC)
  - Regent: Seth Otoo
  - Kpalime Traditional Area: Togbega Asio XI
- Elevation: 163 m (535 ft)
- Time zone: GMT
  - Summer (DST): GMT

Tongor Kaira is a village located in the South Dayi District of the Volta Region of Ghana.

== Location ==
Kaira is located to the east of the Volta lake. It is just to the west of the Akwapim-Togo mountains which extend from the south east of Ghana through the Volta Region into Togo. To the west are Kpalime Duga and To Kpalime and to the north, Tsate Kpalime and Tsibu. To the south are some of the Peki towns. Just over the Akwapim-Togo mountains to the east are Tsito and Anyirawase, all in the Volta Region of Ghana.

== History ==
The people of the Kpalime Traditional Area are believed to have migrated to their present locations from Notsie in Togo. This was to escape the tyranny of Togbe Agorkorli, the king of Notsie. One large group migrated to the coast. The second group includes the people of Wegbe, Kpeve and Klefe among others who settled in the Volta midlands.

== People ==
The indigenous population are the Ewe. Wegbe Kpalime is one of the main villages in the Kpalime Traditional Area. They are related to the other Kpalime towns which include Kpale, Todome, Tsatee, Hiama, Kaira, Toh and Duga. Duga is the main village of the Kpalime Traditional Area.

The inhabitants of Wegbe celebrate the annual Kpalikpakpaza or Kpalikpakpa festival around December each year. This is to commemorate the valour of their ancestors during their migration from Notsie in Togo. This festival was only instituted in 1997. The main celebration rotates between the various villages annually. The 17th festival in November 2012 was celebrated in Kaira.

== Administration ==
Kaira is ruled by a king or Fiaga. At present however, it is ruled by a regent, Seth Otoo. Kaira is within the South Dayi District with capital at Kpeve. The district administration which is based there is headed by a District Chief Executive. This is currently Kafui Bekui.

== See also ==
- Kpalime Traditional Area
- Kafui Bekui
- South Dayi District
- South Dayi (Ghana parliament constituency)
