= To Kpalime =

- Village
- Location within Ghana
- Coordinates: 06°35′32″N 00°11′57″E
- Country: Ghana
- Region: Volta Region
- District: South Dayi District
- Traditional Area: Kpalime Traditional Area

Government
  - District Chief Executive: Patrick Mallett
  - Kpalime Traditional Area: Togbega Asio XI
- Time zone: GMT
  - Summer (DST): GMT

To Kpalime or To is a village located in the South Dayi District of the Volta Region of Ghana. It is one of the towns of the Kpalime Traditional Area.

== Location ==
To is located about 4.5 kilometres east of the Volta lake. It is just to the west of the Akwapim-Togo mountains which extend from the south east of Ghana through the Volta Region into Togo. The nearest towns are Kpalime Duga to the southwest and Tongor Kaira and Tsate Kpalime to the northeast. To the west is Tongor Tsanakpe and the Volta Lake. About 9 kilometres to the east is Tsibu and beyond that, the Akwapim-Togo mountains and Tsito and Anyirawase, both in the Awudome Traditional Area of the Volta Region of Ghana.

== History ==
The people of the Kpalime Traditional Area are believed to have migrated to their present locations from Notsie in Togo. This was to escape the tyranny of Togbe Agorkorli, the king of Notsie. One large group migrated to the coast. The second group includes the people of Wegbe, Kpeve and Klefe among others who settled in the Volta midlands.

== People ==
The indigenous population are the Ewe. To Kpalime is one of the villages in the Kpalime Traditional Area. They are related to the other Kpalime towns which include Wegbe Kpalime, Kpale Kpalime, Todome, Tsatee, Hiama, Tongor Kaira and Kpalime Duga. Kpalime Duga is the main village of the Kpalime Traditional Area.

The inhabitants of Wegbe celebrate the annual Kpalikpakpaza or Kpalikpakpa festival around December each year. This is to commemorate the valour of their ancestors during their migration from Notsie in Togo. This festival was only instituted in 1997. The main celebration rotates between the various villages annually. The 17th festival in November 2012 was celebrated in Kaira. To Kpalime is ruled by its own chief. As it is in the Kpalime Traditional Area, it also comes under the paramount chief of the area, Togbega Atigbladza Agbi Yao VIII who is also the chief of Kpalime Duga.

== Administration ==
The South Dayi District has its capital at Kpeve. There is a District Administration under its current head, Patrick Mallett, the District Chief Executive. There is also a District Assembly with elected representatives also based at Kpeve. The South Dayi (Ghana parliament constituency) constituency also has an elected representative in the Parliament of Ghana.

== See also ==
- Kpalime Traditional Area
- South Dayi District
- South Dayi (Ghana parliament constituency)

== External links and sources ==
- South Dayi District Official website
- To Kpalime
