= Kpalime Traditional Area =

Area in the South Dayi district in the Volta Region of Ghana

- Traditional area
- Country: Ghana
- Region: Volta
- District: South Dayi

Government
  - Paramount Chief: Atigbladza Agbi Yao VIII

The Kpalime Traditional Area is located mainly in the South Dayi District of the Volta Region of Ghana. This area originally was located partly within the Kpando District of the Volta Region but with the creation of new districts in 2004, it now falls within the South Dayi District. Its capital is Kpalime Duga.

== People ==
This traditional area includes the inhabitants of Wegbe, Kpale Kpalime, Todome Kpalime, Tsatee Kpalime, Tongor Kaira, To Kpalime, Hiama Kpalime and Kpalime Duga villages. They all belong to the Ewe ethnic group of Ghana. The main village or capital in this group is Kpalime Duga. The head of the Kpalime Traditional Area is the king or Paramount Chief with the title of Togbega (meaning Paramount King in Ewe).

== Neighbours ==
One of the main neighbouring Traditional Areas include Peki with which it has close relations. Other neighbours of the Kpalime Traditional area include Anum which lies just inside the Eastern Region on the border with the Volta Region and Boso which is populated by the Guan people in the Asuogyaman District.

== Leaders ==
Currently the Paramount Chief of Kpalime Traditional Area is Emmanuel Mawuyram Osae whose official name is Togbega Atigbladza Agbi Yao VIII. He is also the Chief of Kpalime Duga. The position had been vacant for about five years until he was installed in April 2019 at Kpalime Duga. The Dufia of Wegbe Kpalime, Togbe Adza Wiah Kwesi II acted as paramount chief during that period.

== Kpalikpakpa zã ==
The inhabitants celebrate an annual Kpalikpakpa zã or Kpalikpakpa festival usually in December, commemorating the valour of their ancestors during their migration from Notsie in Togo. This festival was only instituted in 1997. The main celebration rotates between the various villages annually. The 19th edition was at Wegbe Kpalime in October 2016. The theme for the celebration was "Education, Key to Development". It also involved a pilgrimage to Kpalimé, Togo. The 23rd edition was celebrated at Duga in November 2019 under the theme "Accelerating development through peace and unity". During the festival, the Paramount chief highlighted the development challenges in the area to government.

== Girls empowerment ==
In 2016, the Kpalime Traditional Area set up a panel made up of seven eminent persons from the area to support the girls empowerment club, Unique Club after the withdrawal of Women in Law & Development in Africa due to financial reasons. They were Woyiram Boakye-Danquah, District Chief executive of the South Dayi District from 2005 to 2009, Kumah Asamoah based in the United States, an engineer and businessman, Felix Lartey, a Transport magnate, Bertha Ansah Djan, Felix Sedem Addae and Wellington Cofie, both engineers, and Jessie Jacintho, a banker.
