= Hlefi =

- Village
- Location of Hlefi
- Coordinates: 6°42′58″N 0°22′17″E
- Country: Ghana
- Region: Volta Region
- District: Ho West District
- District Capital: Dzolokpuita
- Time zone: GMT
  - Summer (DST): GMT

Hlefi is a village in the Ho West District of the Volta Region of Ghana.

It is located on the eastern side of the Akwapim Togo mountain range. It is between Anfoeta Gbogame to the south and Kpale Kpalime to the north. Dzolokpuita, the district capital is about 11 kilometres north east of Hlefi. Other places south of Hlefi include Bame, Ghana, Goviefe Todzi and Kpeve, the capital of the South Dayi District. To the west beyond the Akwapim Togo mountain range in a row going towards the north are Woadze, Agate and Have. To the north beyond Anfoeta Gbogame lie Anfoeta Tsebi and Saviefe. Matse is about 12 kilometres to the east.

The people of Hlefi are predominantly Ewe people who speak the Ewe language.

The Battle of Hlefi was fought between the alliance of people of Akwamu and the Anlo Ewe, then led by King Akoto the Akwamuhene against another alliance of Peki (Krepi) led by King Kwadzo Dei and King Howusu of Ho and other Ewes.
