= Danquah =

Danquah is a surname. Notable people with the surname include:

- Eric Yirenkyi Danquah, Ghana plant geneticist.
- Frank Wiafe Danquah (born 1989), Dutch footballer
- J. B. Danquah (1895–1965), Ghanaian politician, scholar and historian
- J. B. Danquah-Adu, Ghanaian politician
- Joseph Boateng Danquah (born 1947), Ghanaian general
- Kwasi Danquah III (born 1986), Ghanaian musician, better known by his stage name Tinchy Stryder
- Mabel Dove Danquah, Ghanaian journalist and political activist
- Melody Millicent Danquah, Ghana female pilot
- Michael Ebo Danquah, Ghanaian boxer of the 1980s and '90s
- Meri Nana-Ama Danquah (born 1967), Ghanaian-American writer, editor, journalist and public speaker
- Paul Danquah (born 1925), British actor and lawyer
- Woyiram Boakye-Danquah (1942–2007), Ghanaian politician and social worker
