= Rice Festival =

Rice Festival may refer to:

- The Akpafu Rice Festival, held in Ghana's Oti Region
- Aluth Sahal Mangallaya, the New Rice Festival held in Sri Lanka
- The Amu Festival, held in Ho West District of Ghana's Volta Region
- The International Rice Festival, held in Louisiana, U.S.
- Japanese agricultural festivals
- The Texas Rice Festival, held in Winnie, Texas, U.S.
