= Kpalime Duga =

- Town
- Kpalime Duga
- Nickname: Duga
- Location within Ghana
- Coordinates: 06°34′13.28″N 00°10′51.66″E
- Country: Ghana
- Region: Volta Region
- District: South Dayi District

Government
  - Dufia of Kpalime Duga: Togbega Atikpladza Agbi Yao VIII
- Elevation: 137 m (449 ft)
- Time zone: GMT
  - Summer (DST): GMT
- Postal code: 233

Kpalime Duga is a village located in the South Dayi District of the Volta Region of Ghana.

== Location ==
The nearest towns to Duga include To Kpalime to the north. This is also one of the towns in the Kpalime Traditional Area. To the east are the Peki villages of Blengo and Avetile, as well as Tongor-Kaira. To the north east is Tsate Kpalime. The southern neighbours of Duga are Peki Dzake and as well as the Asuogyaman District towns of Anum and Boso.

== History ==
The people of the Kpalime Traditional Area are believed to have migrated to their present locations from Notsie in Togo. This was to escape the tyranny of Togbe Agorkorli, the king of Notsie. One large group migrated to the coast. The second group includes the people of Wegbe, Kpeve and Klefe among others who settled in the Volta midlands.

== People ==
The people of Duga belong to the Ewe people of Ghana. Duga is the main town of the Kpalime Traditional Area. It is related to the other Kpalime villages which include Kpale, Todome, Tsatee, Hiama, Kaira, To and Wegbe Kpalime.

The inhabitants of Duga celebrate the annual Kpalikpakpaza or Kpalikpakpa festival around December each year. This is to commemorate the valour of their ancestors during their migration from Notsie in Togo. This festival was only instituted in 1997. The main celebration rotates between the various towns annually.

== Administration ==
Kpalime Duga is ruled by a king or Fiaga. Duga is within the South Dayi District with capital at Kpeve. The district administration which is based there is headed by a District Chief Executive.

== See also ==
- Kpalime Traditional Area
- Ernest Patrick Kojo Mallet
- South Dayi District
- South Dayi (Ghana parliament constituency)

== External links and sources ==
- South Dayi District Official website
- The Story of Kpalime Duga and Notsie
