= Akrofu =

Village in Ho Municipality, Volta Region, Ghana

Akrofu Akrɔfu
- Village
- Motto: Xe fo Nu Maɖe Gbe
- Location of Akrofu
- Coordinates: 6°38′N 0°23′E
- Country: Ghana
- Region: Volta Region
- District: Ho Municipal

Government
  - District Chief Executive: Ernest Victor Apau
- Time zone: GMT
  - Summer (DST): GMT

Akrofu is predominantly a farming community in the Ho Municipality of Volta Region, Ghana. It is noted for the production of rice, okro, cassava and garri.

== Geography ==
Akrofu is about 16 km from Ho, the Volta regional capital. It has Sokode to the south west, Klefe, Ziavi, and Hlefi to the south east, Wegbe Kpalime to the North West and Bame to the North East.

Akrofu is made up of two major communities; Xeviwofe and Agove, with Xeviwofe being the paramountcy Fiaga Stool (Paramount Stool). Volta Region, Ghana. There are other settler villages such as Dzebukope, Kpetorkope, etc. as part of Akrofu's traditional setup.

== History ==
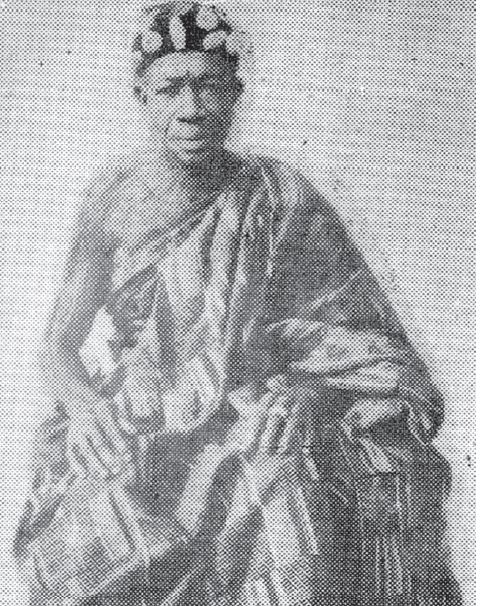
Togbe Kwami Foli VIII (1950 - 1984) is the recent past paramount chief of Akrofu traditional area.

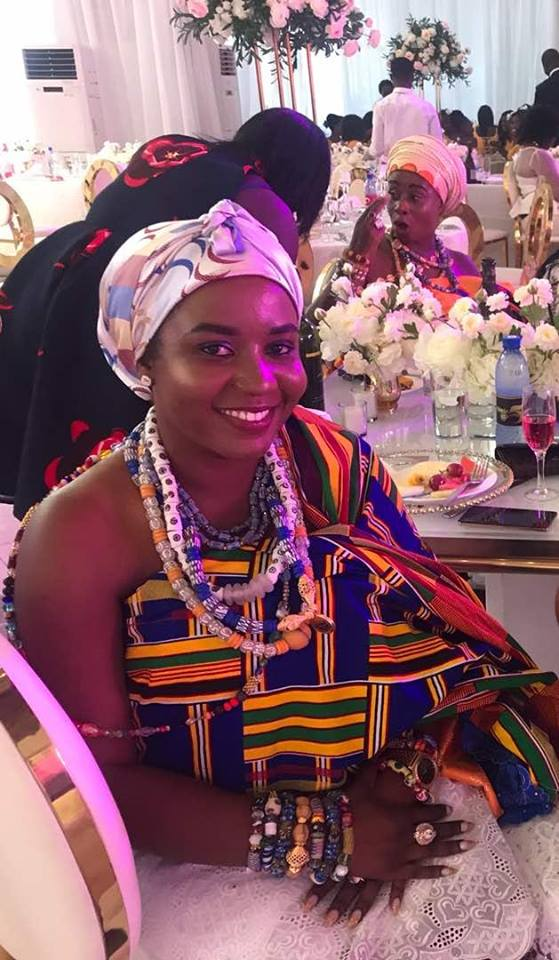
Mamaga Akua Sabea Nyabor VII, Queenmother of Akrofu Traditional Area and Secretary of the Queenmothers Association of the Volta Regional House of Chiefs.

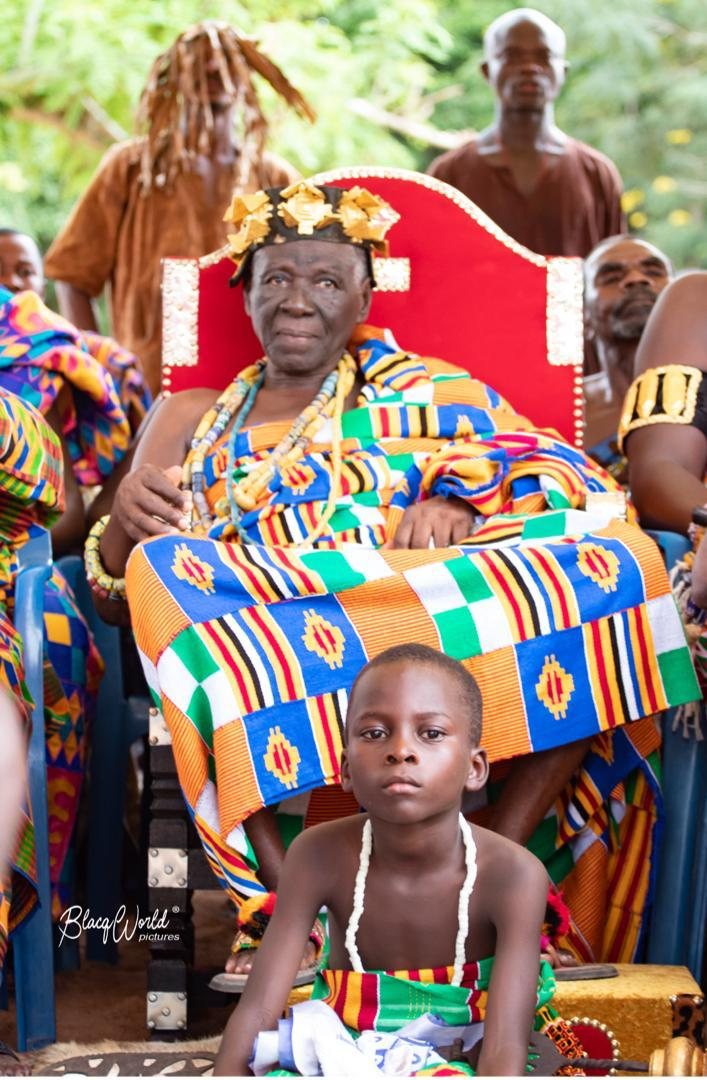
Togbe_Koku_Foli_IX (1985-2021)

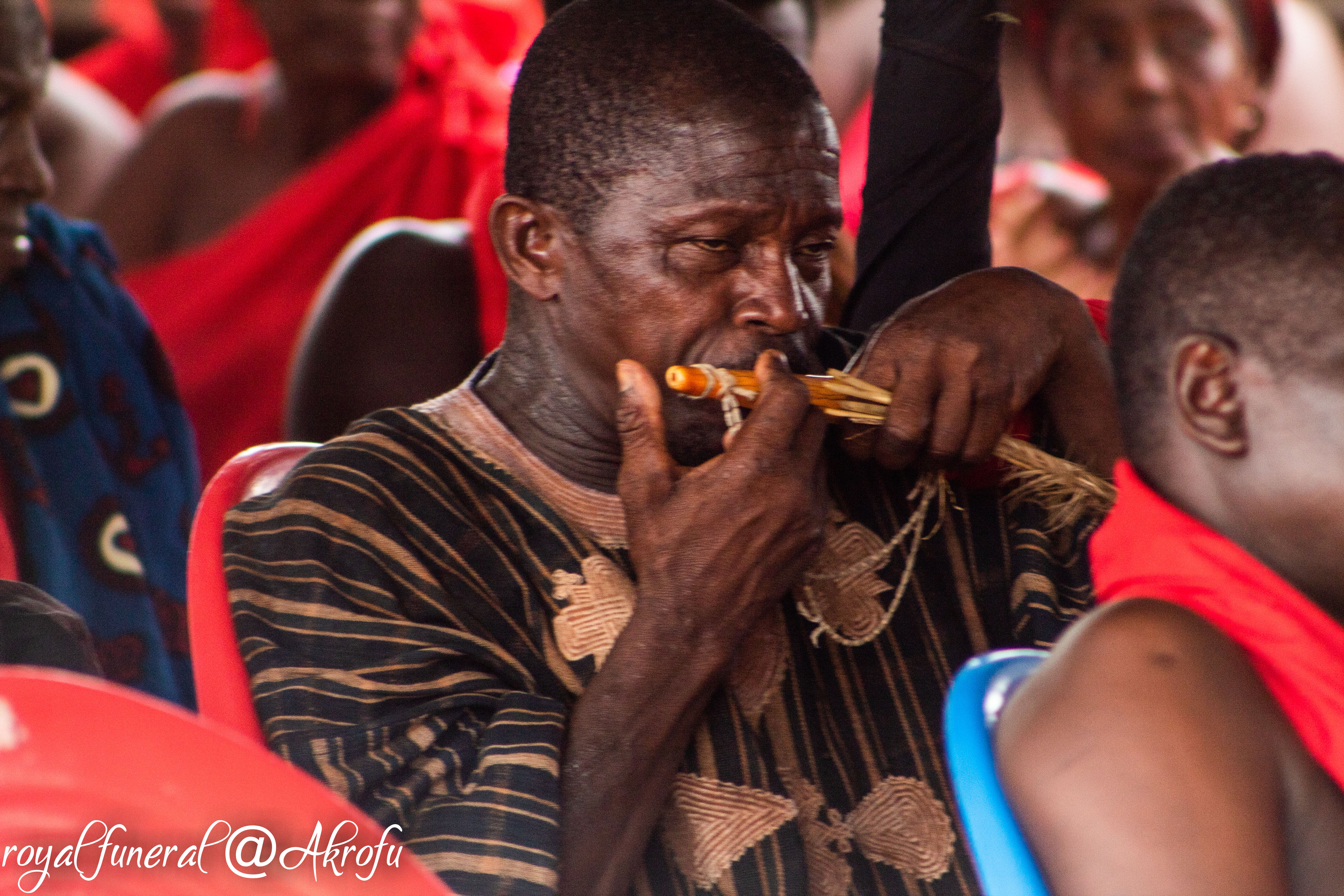
A royal paving the way for the chief to speak.

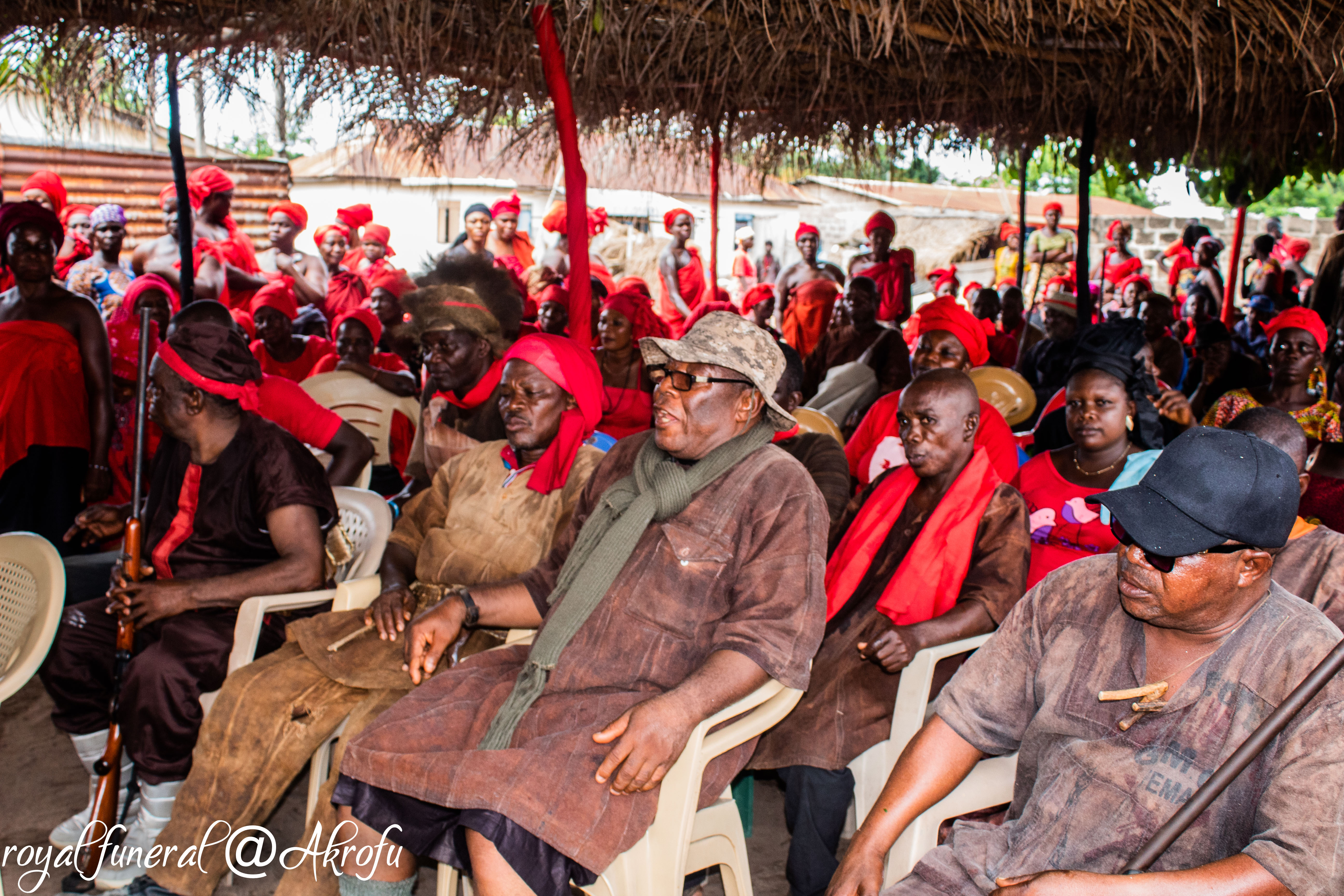
Joint Asafo group of Ziavi and Akrofu during the funeral of the late Queenmother of Akrofu traditional area, Mamaga Dorothia Akua Sarbia Nyabor VI.

The people of Akrofu migrated from Ìlé Ifẹ̀, a Yorùbá city in Nigeria with other Ewe groups, and later through Dahomey, Benin. This group finally disintegrated in Notsie in the Republic of Togo. They were led from Notsie by their leaders Amega Blema, Xortor, and Xe. Amega Xe died when they got to the current settlement of the people of Akrofu. Few people were selected to stay on that land in memory of their late leader Amega Xe. The others moved on to form Saviefe, Sovie, and Alavanyo communities. These four communities are collectively called Sakomeawó, and they celebrate the Sasadu Festival.

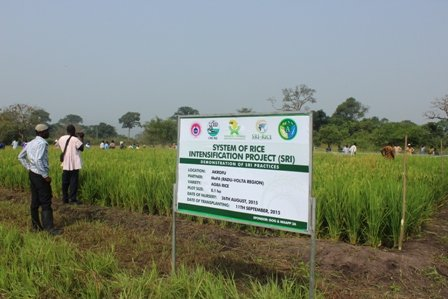
A demonstration rice farm in Akrofu.

== Bibliography ==
- Dzathor, Paul Kwami (1998). The Ewe Nation and SASADU: A Brief History. P.K. Dzathor. ISBN 9789988000257.
- "City (town) Akrofu: map, population, location". www.celysvet.cz.
