= Kodzo Ayeke =

Ghanaian politician, lawyer and journalist

Member of the Ghana Parliament for Ho West
- In office 1954–1960
- Preceded by: New Constituency
- Succeeded by: Hans Kofi Boni

Personal details
- Born: 22 May 1923 Taviefe
- Died: 20 May 1985 (aged 61) Hohoe, Ghana
- Cause of death: Illness
- Education: Accra Academy
- Alma mater: University of London; Gray’s Inn

Kodzo Afelete Ayeke (22 May 1923 – 20 May 1985) was a Ghanaian politician, teacher, journalist, lawyer, and author. He was a member of parliament for Ho West, elected in 1954 and again in 1956 as a Togoland Congress member, and joined the United Party when the Togoland Congress was banned in 1958. As a journalist, he founded the Togoland Vanguard, the first newspaper in what was then Trans-Volta Togoland. An ethnic Ewe, he published two novels in the Ewe language, Asitsu Atoawo and Hlobiabia.

== Early life and education ==
Kodzo Ayeke was born in Taviefe on 22 May 1923, the son of Augustus Ayeke and Ella Kafe Ayeke. His father, Augustus, was a carpenter and farmer at Taviefe. Kodzo Ayeke was the grandson of Bele Komla, a famed local priest of Taviefe.

Ayeke started schooling at Taviefe in 1931 before continuing at the middle school at Amedzofe, graduating in 1940. He entered the Accra Academy in 1942 as one of the first two people from his home town, Taviefe, to receive a secondary education. At the Accra Academy, he obtained the Cambridge School Certificate with exemption in 1946. In June 1959, he received the Inter LLB of the University of London after studying as a private candidate. In exile from Ghana, he continued his law studies in England and was called to the bar at Gray’s Inn in 1973, at the age of fifty. He graduated in law from the University of London in 1975.

== Civil service, teaching and journalism ==
After his secondary education, he joined the Gold Coast Civil Service in 1947. He was stationed at the Head Office of the Customs and Excise Department (now the Customs Excise and Preventive Service). In 1950, Ayeke left the civil service and joined an Ewe Christian minister at Ve-Koloenu. There, he became a teacher at a newly founded school, Togo Academy, and taught at the school until 1953.

In 1953, Ayeke founded and became editor of the Togoland Vanguard, a newspaper he operated from Hohoe. The Togoland Vanguard was the first newspaper in Trans-Volta Togoland, a UN trust territory under British trusteeship. Through his paper, he became an advocate of the Togoland Unification Movement, which sought to unite Trans-Volta with French Togoland.

== Member of Parliament and political life ==
In 1954, Ayeke stood for parliament in Ho West on the Togoland Congress ticket. He was elected Member of Parliament (MP) and was one of three Togoland Congress members to win a seat that year. In 1956, he was re-elected as MP for Ho West. This time, he was one of two members of the Togoland Congress to be elected to parliament.

In parliament, Ayeke continued his advocacy for the reunification of Trans-Volta with French Togoland. He led the Togoland Congress during the 1956 British Togoland status plebiscite to campaign for votes against unification with the Gold Coast. Ayeke also sought to have the Togoland Academy placed on the list of government-assisted schools. In 1959, Ayeke argued against the renaming of Trans-Volta/Togoland Region as Volta Region. He criticised Nkrumah’s spending on the creation of an office to advise on African Affairs and his appointment of George Padmore to that office.

In November 1957, Ayeke and S. G. Antor, the two Togoland Congress parliamentarians, were arrested and charged with riots in Alavanyo, a town in the then Trans-Volta Togoland. In March 1958, both men were sentenced to six years imprisonment by a High Court in Ho which ruled them guilty, but on a further hearing by the Court of Appeal in June 1958, they were released to re-join parliament.

In 1960, Ayeke resigned as member of parliament for the Ho West constituency and was succeeded by Hans Kofi Boni through a bye-election. In 1961, Ayeke left Ghana for Togo where he became a political refugee. In October 1965, he left Togo for West Germany and thereafter settled in England in 1966. There, Ayeke was chairman of the London branch of the Progress Party formed to contest elections in Ghana during Ghana's Second Republic from 1969 to 1972.

In Ghana's Third Republic, Ayeke was the chairman of the Volta Regional Branch of the Popular Front Party from 1979 to 1981. Following his legal studies in England, Ayeke returned to Ghana in 1979 to practise privately. He underwent pupillage with Alfred Kpodonu of Alfredo Chambers and subsequently set up his own private practice, Tomefa Chambers. He set up his practice in the offices that became the Volta Regional Branch of the Popular Front Party after the lifting of the ban on party politics in 1979. His private law firm, Tomefa Chambers, initially at Ho-Bakoe, was subsequently relocated to his hometown, Taviefe, with an annex at Hohoe. Ayeke was a member of the Volta Region branch of the Ghana Bar Association.

== Authorship ==
Ayeke authored and published two books in the Ewe language, Asitsu Atoawo (1998) and Hlobiabia (1998). He published a third book in English, a collection of his poems titled Blackman's Image. He also left behind two unpublished political manuscripts, Africa Looks Ahead and The Ugly Side, and an unpublished novel, The Divine Mission. The Five Rivals, his English rendition of his Ewe-written book Asitsu Atoawo, was also left behind to be published posthumously.

== Personal life and death ==
Ayeke died on 20 May 1985 after being on admission for fever for five days at the Hohoe Government Hospital. Ayeke was sixty-one years old at his death. He left behind seventeen children. His funeral was attended by Victor Owusu, who had been presidential candidate of the Popular Front Party in Ghana’s Third Republic.
