= Alexander Ransford Ababio =

Ghanaian politician (1927–2002)

- In office 7 January 1993 – 6 January 1997

Member of parliament for South Dayi Constituency
- In office 7 January 1997 – 6 January 2001
- President: John Jerry Rawlings
- Succeeded by: Daniel K. Ampofo

Personal details
- Born: 27 December 1927
- Died: November 2002 (aged 74) Washington D.C., U.S.
- Party: National Democratic Congress
- Education: Mission House College, University of Saarland
- Occupation: Politician
- Profession: Medical practitioner and a farmer

Alexander Ransford Ababio (27 December 1927 – November 2002) was a Ghanaian politician. He was a member of parliament for the South Dayi constituency in the Volta region of Ghana in the first and second parliament of the 4th republic of Ghana.

== Early life and education ==
Alexander Ransford Ababio was born on 27 December 1927 in the Volta Region. He studied medicine at the Mission House College where he obtained his Bachelor of Science and after went to the University of Saarland and obtained his Doctor of Medicine.

== Career ==
Ababio was a medical practitioner and a farmer by profession.

== Politics ==
Ababio was first elected into parliament in 1992 Ghanaian parliamentary election as member of the 1st parliament of the 4th republic of Ghana. He represented again the South Dayi constituency in the 2nd parliament of the 4th republic of Ghana in the 1996 Ghanaian general elections. He was elected on the ticket of the National Democratic Congress. He was the incumbent member of parliament who represented the constituency in the first parliament of the 4th republic of Ghana. Ababio lost his seat to Daniel K. Ampofo also of the National Democratic Congress in the subsequent elections of 2000.

== Elections ==
Ababio was elected with 12951 votes out of 17626 valid votes cast representing 73.48% of the total valid votes cast. He was elected over Winfred Manfred Asimah an independent who polled 2,397 votes representing 8.60% of the share, Barney Kodzo Agbo of the New Patriotic party (NPP) who polled 1,898 votes representing 6.80% of the share, and Akudeka Victor Kofi of the People's National Convention (PNC) who polled 380 votes representing 1.40% of the share.

== Personal life and death ==
Ababio was a Christian. He died in Washington D.C. in November 2002, at the age of 74.
