= Wegbe Kpalime =

Wegbe-Kpalime (Ʋegbe Kpalime)
- Village
- Nickname: Holy City
- Location within Ghana
- Coordinates: 06°39′00″N 00°20′28.3″E
- Country: Ghana
- Region: Volta Region
- District: South Dayi District

Government
  - District Chief Executive: Ernest Kojo Mallett
  - Fiaga of Wegbe: Togbe Wiah Kwasi II
  - Kpalime Traditional Area: Togbui Agbi Yao III
- Elevation: 248 m (814 ft)
- Time zone: GMT
  - Summer (DST): GMT
- Ghana Post GPS: VE
- Area code: 03620

Wegbe Kpalime is a village located in the South Dayi District of the Volta Region of Ghana.

== History ==
The people of the Kpalime Traditional Area are believed to have migrated to their present locations from Notsie in Togo. This was to escape the tyranny of Togbe Agorkorli, the king of Notsie. One large group migrated to the coast. The second group includes the people of Wegbe, Kpeve and Klefe among others who settled in the Volta midlands.

== People ==
The indigenous population are the Ewe. Wegbe Kpalime is one of the main villages in the Kpalime Traditional Area. They are related to the other Kpalime towns which include Kpale, Todome, Tsatee, Hiama, Kaira, To and Duga. Duga is the main village of the Kpalime Traditional Area.

The inhabitants of Wegbe celebrate the annual Kpalikpakpa zã or Kpalikpakpa festival around December each year. This is to commemorate the valour of their ancestors during their migration from Notsie in Togo. This festival was only instituted in 1997. The main celebration rotates between the various villages annually.

== Location ==
The nearest village to Wegbe is Bame, which is about 1.3 kilometres (0.81 mi) to the northeast. Akrofu is about 4.5 kilometres (2.8 mi) to the southeast and Avenui, 5.7 kilometres (3.5 mi) to the south. Ho, the regional capital, is about 15 kilometres (9.3 mi) southeast of Wegbe but about 25 kilometres (16 mi) by road. To the west and north-west lie part of the Akwapim-Togo mountain range and beyond that the Volta Lake. The highest peak in Ghana, Mount Afadja, known in Ewe as Afadzato lies in this range. The South Dayi District capital, Kpeve is located 2.7 kilometres (1.7 mi) to the north west or 6.8 kilometres (4.2 mi) by road.

== Administration ==
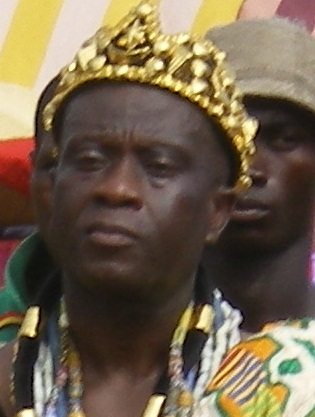
Togbe Wiah Kwasi II Paramount Chief of Wegbe Kpalime (2010 — 2022)

Wegbe Kpalime is ruled by a king or Fiaga. The current Fiaga is Silas Wiah. His official title is Togbe Wiah Kwasi II. His rule started in May 2010. Wegbe Kpalime is within the South Dayi District with capital at Kpeve. The district administration which is based there is headed by a District Chief Executive. This is currently Ernest Kojo Mallett. He succeeded Kafui Bekui, who hails from Wegbe Kpalime.

== Transportation ==
Road transport is the main local option at Wegbe Kpalime. The main road through the town runs from a south west in a north easterly direction. It starts as a branch of the N2 road at Asikuma in the Asuogyaman District of the Eastern Region and continues through Anyirawase Awudome where there is a branch toward Ho, capital of the Volta Region. Continuing north east from Wegbe, it passes through Bame then turns westward over the Akwapim Togo mountains to Kpeve. There is a branch at Bame going north through Anfoeta Gbogame to Kpedze. The nearest airport is the Gnassingbé Eyadéma International Airport which is about 61 nautical miles southeast in Lomé, Togo. The nearest airport within Ghana is the Accra International Airport in Accra. Construction has started on a closer airport, the Ho Airport at Ho which is about 15 kilometres (9.3 mi) to the southeast. There are no rail transport services in the Volta Region.

== See also ==
- Kpalime Traditional Area
- Kafui Bekui
- South Dayi District
- South Dayi (Ghana parliament constituency)

== External links and sources ==
- South Dayi District Official website
- Google maps
