= South Dayi =

South Dayi may refer to:

- South Dayi District, district of Ghana in the Volta Region
- South Dayi (Ghana parliament constituency), one of the constituencies represented in the Parliament of Ghana
