= Kpeve =

Kpeve Kpeve
- District Capital
- Location in Ghana
- Coordinates: 6°41′1″N 0°20′1″E
- Country: Ghana
- Region: Volta Region
- Districts: South Dayi District

Government
  - District Chief Executive: Ernest Kojo Mallett
- Elevation: 188 m (617 ft)
- Time zone: GMT
  - Summer (DST): GMT
- Ghana Post GPS: VE
- Area code: +233 36 20

Kpeve is a small town located in the Volta Region of Ghana and divided into Kpeve Old Town, which is part of the Afadjato South District and Kpeve New Town which is part of the South Dayi District, the administrative district capital of South Dayi district.

== Location ==
Kpeve is located at the northern end of the South Dayi District. It lies just to the west of the foot of the Akwapim Togo mountain range. Its nearest neighbour to the east is Goviefe Todzi, a village on the mountain. Just over to the east of the mountains is Bame, a junction town which leads north to Kpale Xorse and Kpale Kpalime. To the south east is Wegbe Kpalime. Directly south is Adzokoe, one of the Peki towns. Todome lies southwards between Adzokoe and Kpeve.

== See also ==
- South Dayi (Ghana parliament constituency)
