= Anum =

- Town
- Location within Ghana
- Coordinates: 6°29′41″N 0°09′04″E
- Country: Ghana
- Region: Eastern Region
- District: Asuogyaman District
- Elevation: 663 ft (202 m)

Population
  - Ethnicities: Guan people
- Time zone: GMT
  - Summer (DST): GMT

Anum is an Guan community in Asuogyaman District of the Eastern Region of Ghana, across from the Volta Lake. Asikuma is a town under the paramountcy of Anum the town is popularly known for the West African Fish ltd. Which is all about high quality fish, well-managed production and state of the art recirculation technology. The town has an L/A Junior high school.

== Location ==
Anum lies about a kilometre east of the Volta Lake. The nearest town to the north is Boso, Ghana, also in the Eastern Region. Further north across the border into the Volta Region lies Kpalime Duga in the South Dayi District. Peki Dzake and Peki Wudome are to the east in the Volta Region. To the south is Asikuma, also part of the Asuogyaman District. The district capital, Atimpoku is about 28 kilometres south of Anum.

== Note ==
Anum is a town without dogs.
