= Francis Aggrey Agbotse =

Ghanaian politician

Hon Francis Aggrey Agbotse

Member of Parliament for Ho West constituency
- In office 7 January 2005 – 6 January 2009
- President: John Agyekum Kufour
- Succeeded by: Emmanuel Kwasi Bedzrah

Member of parliament for Ho West constituency
- In office 7 January 2001 – 6 January 2005
- President: John Agyekum Kufour

Personal details
- Born: Francis Aggrey Agbotse; 10 October 1944 Afram Plain North
- Died: 2 January 2021 (aged 76)
- Resting place: Kpedze, Volta Region
- Party: National Democratic Congress
- Occupation: Politician
- Profession: Lawyer

Francis Aggrey Agbotse is a Ghanaian politician and a member of the National Democratic Congress. He was the Member of Parliament in the Volta Region for the Ho-West constituency in the fourth parliament of the fourth Republic of Ghana.

== Early life and education ==
He attained a bachelor's degree and an academic major in sociology.

== Career ==
Agbotse is a Ghanaian lawyer.

== Political career ==
Agboste is a member of National Democratic Congress. Agbotse catalogued some of his achievements as improving on basic school infrastructure in the area, including the provision of library books which was worth 60 million cedis each to seven Senior Secondary Schools and the Amedzofe Teacher Training from his MPs Common Fund and other sources.

He then further listed other projects as the provision of electricity to most communities in the Volta Region and the provision of boreholes to 75 Guinea worm endemic communities at a cost of 326,000 dollars with support from Rotary International and some road projects.

During the 1996 Ghanaian General Elections, He polled 34,581 votes out of the 36,156 valid votes cast representing 95.60% over Victoria Yaa Boahene of the Convention People's Party who polled 1,284 votes representing 3.55% and Seth Kofi Bonso of the People's National Congress who polled 291 votes representing 0.80%.

=== 2000 Elections ===
Agbotse was elected as the member of parliament for the Ho West constituency in the 2000 Ghanaian general elections. He won the elections on the ticket of the National Democratic Congress.

His constituency was a part of the 17 parliamentary seats out of 19 seats won by the National Democratic Congress in that election for the Volta Region. The National Democratic Congress won a minority total of 92 parliamentary seats out of 200 seats in the 3rd parliament of the 4th republic of Ghana.

He was elected with 22,991 votes out of 29,548 total valid votes cast. This was equivalent to 78.1% of the total valid votes cast. He was elected over E. Kafui Asem of the Convention People's Party, Grace Adinyira of the National Reformed Party and John Von Backustein of the New Patriotic Party. These obtained 4,377, 1,471 and 596 votes respectively out of the total valid votes cast. These were equivalent to 14.9%, 5.0% and 2.0% respectively of total valid votes cast.

=== 2004 Elections ===
He was elected as the Member of parliament for the Ho-West constituency in the Volta Region of Ghana for the first time in the 2004 Ghanaian general elections.

He won the election with 26,065 votes out of 31,602 total valid votes and became the member of parliament for the Ho-West constituency in the 4th parliament of the 4th republic of Ghana. He was elected over Elizabeth Akua Ohene of the New Patriotic Party and Ellah Nancy Sifa of the Every Ghanaian Living Everywhere party.

These obtained 5,346 votes and 191 votes out of the total valid votes cast. These were equivalent to 16.9% and 0.6% of the total valid votes cast. His constituency was a part of the 20 constituencies won by the National Democratic Congress in the Greater Accra region in that elections.

In all, the National Democratic Congress won a total 94 parliamentary seats in the 4th parliament of the 4th republic of Ghana.

== Personal life ==
He is a Christian.
