= Daniel Kwame Ampofo =

Ghanaian politician

Hon. Daniel Kwame Ampofo

Member of Ghana Parliament for South Dayi constituency
- In office 7 January 2001 – 6 January 2009
- Preceded by: Alexander R. Ababio
- Succeeded by: Simon Edem Asimah

Personal details
- Born: 6 May 1950 (age 76) Dayi, Volta Region Gold Coast (now Ghana)
- Party: National Democratic Congress
- Education: University of Ghana; University of Pennsylvania
- Occupation: Politician
- Profession: Chemical engineer

Daniel Kwame Ampofo (born 6 May 1950) is a Ghanaian politician and a member of the Fourth Parliament of the Fourth Republic of Ghana representing the South Dayi Constituency in the Volta Region of Ghana.

== Early life and education ==
Ampofo was born in Dayi in the Volta Region of Ghana on 6 May 1950. He attended the University of Ghana and obtained a Bachelor of Science degree. He then attended the University of Pennsylvania and obtained a Masters of Science.

== Career ==
Ampofo is a chemical engineer by profession.

== Politics ==
Ampofo is a member of the National Democratic Congress. He was the member of parliament for the South Dayi Constituency in the 3rd parliament of the 4th republic of Ghana after he won in the 2000 Ghanaian general elections.

=== 2000 Elections ===
Ampofo was elected as the member of parliament for the South Dayi constituency in the 2000 Ghanaian general elections. He won the elections on the ticket of the National Democratic Congress.

His constituency was a part of the 17 parliamentary seats out of 19 seats won by the National Democratic Congress in that election for the Volta Region. The National Democratic Congress won a minority total of 92 parliamentary seats out of 200 seats in the 3rd parliament of the 4th republic of Ghana.

He was elected with 10,392 votes out of 14,239 total valid votes cast. This was equivalent to 74.1% of the total valid votes cast. He was elected over Kofi Sabon Asare of the Convention People's Party, Agyepong D. Odoba of the New Patriotic Party and Yao Peter Nkrumah of the People's National Convention.

These obtained 2,662,920 and 49 votes respectively out of the total valid votes cast. These were equivalent to 19%, 6.6% and 0.3% respectively of total valid votes cast.

=== 2004 Elections ===
He was re-elected into Parliament on the ticket of the National Democratic Congress during the December 2004 Ghanaian General elections representing the South Dayi Constituency in the Volta Region of Ghana. He polled 3,168 votes out of the 6,305 valid votes cast representing 50.20%.

He was elected over Ernest Patrick Mallet of the New Patriotic Party and Bernard Duose an independent candidate. These obtained 2,284 votes and 853 votes respectively of the total valid votes cast. These were equivalent to 36.2% and 13.5% of the total valid votes cast.

His constituency was a part of the 20 constituencies won by the National Democratic Congress in the Greater Accra region in that elections. In all, the National Democratic Congress won a total 94 parliamentary seats in the 4th parliament of the 4th republic of Ghana.

== Personal life ==
Ampofo is a Christian.
