= Yirenkyi =

Yirenkyi is a surname. Notable people with the surname include:

- Asiedu Yirenkyi (1942–2018), Ghanaian playwright
- Caleb Yirenkyi (born 2006), Ghanaian footballer

== See also ==
- Eric Yirenkyi Danquah, Ghanaian plant geneticist
