= Rockson-Nelson Dafeamekpor =

Ghanaian politician

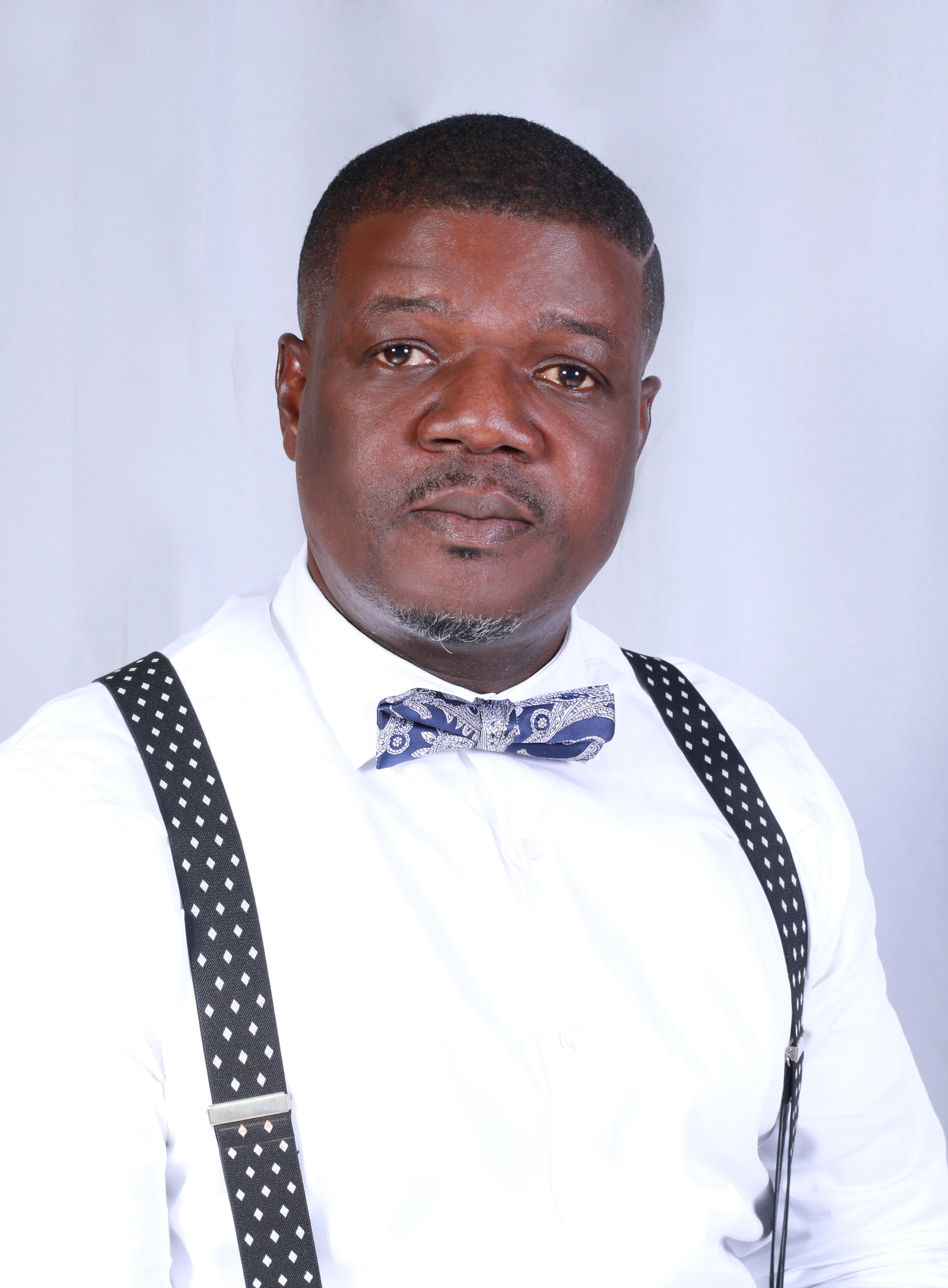

Member of the Ghana Parliament for South Dayi
- Incumbent
- Assumed office 7 January 2017
- Preceded by: Simon Edem Asimah

Personal details
- Born: 9 December 1976 (age 49)
- Party: National Democratic Congress
- Education: University of Ghana
- Occupation: Lawyer
- Member of Public Accounts; Standing Orders; Constitutional, Legal & Parliamentary Affairs committees

Rockson-Nelson Etse Kwami Dafeamekpor is a Ghanaian politician and the Member of Parliament representing the South Dayi constituency in the Volta Region. He is a member of the National Democratic Congress. He is member of the 7th and 8th parliament of the 4th republic.

== Early life and education ==
Dafeamekpor obtained a B.Sc. degree in tourism from the University of Cape Coast. He also completed the LL. B. and LLM at the University of Ghana. He proceeded to the Ghana School of Law where he qualified as a Barrister-at-Law. He attended Anlo Sec School, Anloga for his GCE Ordinary Level and later to Mawuli School, Ho, for his GCE Advanced Level. He obtained Advanced Certificate at International Law Institute, Georgetown University, Washington DC.

== Work ==
Prior to becoming an MP, Dafeamekpor was a Senior Associate at the Hayibor, Djarbeng and Company law firm based at Kokomlemle, a suburb of Accra.

== Politics ==
2016 General Elections

He first entered parliament following the 2016 Ghanaian general election where he won the seat with 71.44% of the votes. This gave him an eight percent majority.

2020 General Elections

In the 2020 general election, he retained his seat with a reduced majority of 1.26%, having won 72.7% of the total votes cast. He has served on the Public Accounts committee, the Standing Orders committee and the Constitutional, Legal and Parliamentary Affairs committee of parliament.

2024 General Elections

In the 2024 general election, he retained his seat with an increased majority of 7.54% having won 80.24% of the total votes cast. He is currently serving as a member under the Appointments committee, Business committee, Committee of Selection, Ways and Means committee, Special committee (Winnowing) and as the Chairperson for the House committee.

== Personal life ==
Dafeamekpor is a Christian and he is married to Ebi Bright, Mayor of Tema, with four children.…

== Accident ==
On 14 August 2021, it was reported he was involved in an accident on the Aveyime road in the Volta region. His vehicle was claimed to have somersaulted two times after a Kia truck crossed his envoy and crashed his vehicle. He was later released from the 37 Military Hospital after he receiving treatment.

== Controversy ==
In January 2025, Dafeamekpor was suspended by Alban Bagbin for 2 weeks after he was involved in chaos during the sitting of the Appointments Committee.

Parliament of Ghana
Preceded by Simon Edem Asimah	Member of Parliament for South Dayi; 2017–present	Incumbent
