= Kafui =

Kafui is a given name and a surname. Notable people include:

- Kafui Adjamagbo-Johnson (born 1958), Togolese politician, lawyer and human rights activist
- Kafui Bekui, Ghanaian civil servant
- Kenneth Kafui (1951–2020), Ghanaian composer
- Kafui Dzirasa, American engineer and psychologist
