= E.K.D. Anku-Tsede =

Ghanaian politician

Member of Parliament for the Ho west constituency
- In office 7 January 1993 – 7 January 1997
- President: Jerry John Rawlings
- Preceded by: Samuel Yao Dzebu
- Succeeded by: Francis Aggrey Agbotse

Personal details
- Born: 12 February 1934 (age 92)
- Party: National Democratic Congress
- Education: Kumasi College of Technology
- Occupation: Politician
- Profession: Educationist

Anku-Tsede (also Lt. Col E.K.D. Anku-Tsede) (born 12 February 1934) is a Ghanaian politician and an Educationist. He served as a member of parliament for the Ho west constituency in the Volta Region of Ghana, 7 January 1993 to 7 January 1997.

== Early life and education ==
Anku-Tsede was born on February 12, 1934. He attended Kumasi College of Technology where he obtained a Junior Staff Course Certificate.

== Politics ==
Anku-Tsede was first elected into parliament during the 1992 Ghanaian parliamentary election as member of the first parliament of the fourth republic of Ghana on the ticket of the National Democratic Congress. He was preceded by Samuel Yao Dzebu. He lost the seat to Francis Aggrey Agbotse of the National Democratic Congress who won the seat during the 1996 Ghanaian general election with 34,581 votes by defeating Victoria Yaa Boahene of the Convention People's Party (CPP) who obtained 1,284 votes and Seth Kofi Bonso of the People's National Convention (PNC) who obtained 291 votes.

On 30 June 1995, he talked about the drugs issues in the country and cautioned ''Otherwise, we will move up further to become an addicted country and finally arrive at the point of national disaster ''. It was in commemorate of International Drug Day

== Career ==
Anku-Tsede is an Educationist. He was also the chairman of the Committee on Defense and Interior.

== Personal life ==
He is a Christian.
