= Kpedze Senior High School =

High school in Kpedze, Ghana

- Kpedze, Volta Region; Ghana

Information
- Type: secondary/high school
- Established: 1962 (64 years ago)
- Grades: Forms [1-3]
- Nickname: KPESCO

Kpedze Senior High School (also known as KPESCO) is a second cycle institution in Kpedze in the Ho West District in the Volta Region of Ghana.

== History ==
The school was established on 12 November 1962 with an initial enrollment of ten boys and five girls.

== Governance ==
The school operates under the supervision of the Ghana Education Service within the Ministry of Education

== Awards and recognition ==
- Winner of the 2016 debate organized by the Evangelical Presbyterian University College.
- Winner of the 2022 Volta Regional Renewable Energy Challenge hosted by the Energy Commission.

== Notable alumni ==
- Dzifa Attivor, former politician and Deputy Minister for Transport.

== Former headteachers ==
- Gabriel Mawusi Aku (2011)
- Togbe Foe Tsali II (2019)
- Gadotor Yram (2020)
