= Felix Kwasi Adinyira =

Ghanaian politician (born 1925)

Hon. Felix Kwasi Adinyira

Member of Parliament for Ho West constituency
- In office 1 October 1969 – 13 January 1972

Personal details
- Born: 25 September 1925 (age 100)
- Party: National Alliance of Liberals
- Education: University of Wisconsin, University of Paris (Sorbonne), Alliance Francaise
- Occupation: Politician
- Profession: Lecturer

Felix Kwasi Adinyira (born 25 September 1925) was a Ghanaian politician who was a member of the first parliament of the second republic of Ghana representing Ho West constituency in the Volta Region of Ghana under the membership of the National Alliance Liberals (NAL).

== Early life and education ==
Adinyira was born on 25 September 1925. He attended University of Paris (Sorbonne), Alliance Francaise, Paris, University of Wisconsin where he obtained a Brevet D'Aptitude Professionelle and Master's degree in French and later worked as a Lecturer before going into Parliament.

== Politics ==
Adinyira began his political career in 1969 as the parliamentary candidate for the constituency of Ho West in the Volta Region of Ghana prior to the commencement of the 1969 Ghanaian parliamentary election.

Adinyira was sworn into the First Parliament of the Second Republic of Ghana on 1 October 1969, after being pronounced winner at the 1969 Ghanaian election held on 26 August 1969. and his tenure of office ended on 13 January 1972.

== Personal life ==
Adinyira was a Christian. He was a businessman and a lecturer.
