= Ve Golokwati =

- District Capital
- Location in Ghana
- Coordinates: 6°59′32.12″N 0°25′32.12″E
- Country: Ghana
- Region: Volta Region
- District: Afadzato South District
- Elevation: 60 m (200 ft)
- Time zone: GMT
  - Summer (DST): GMT

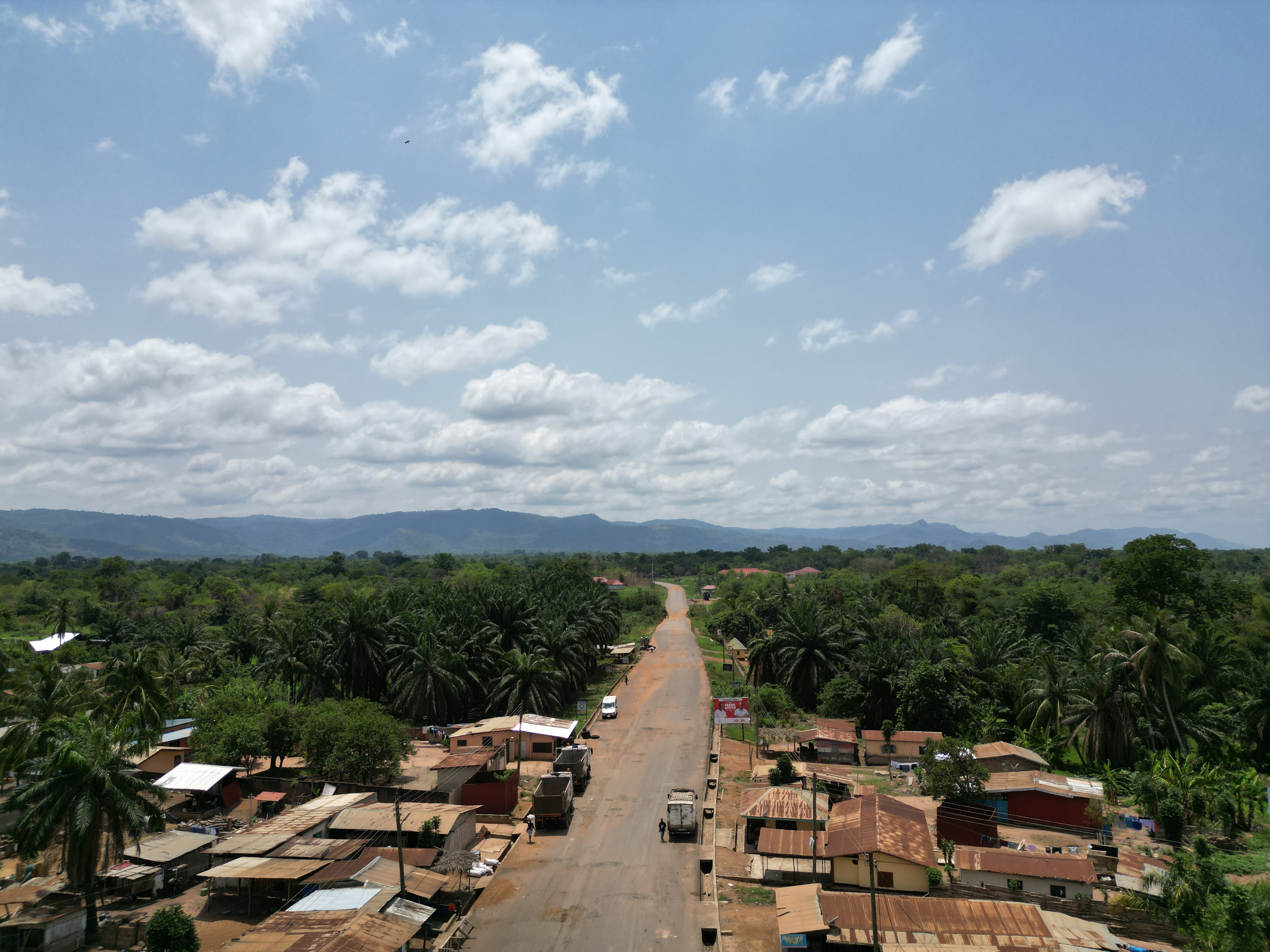
Ve-Golokuati Township

Ve-Golokuati is a small town and is the capital of the Afadzato South district, a district in the central Volta Region of Ghana.

== Geography ==
=== Location ===
Ve-Golokuati is located between Ve-Koloenu and Ve-Gbodome one of the oldest Municipal districts in Volta Region. It is located at a strategic point. Ve-Golokuati is linked with road network to Liati (Mountain Afadzato and Afadzato falls, one of the tourist destinations in Ghana, to the west Ve-Golokuati is Hohoe, to the east is Tafi Atome Monkey Sanctuary another tourist destinations where you can see nature at its best. To the South is Kpando, where one can see the Volta Lake. The republic of Togo is not far from Ve-Golokuati.
