= Vakpo =

Coordinates: 6°51.2′N 0°17′E

Vakpo VK City
- Town
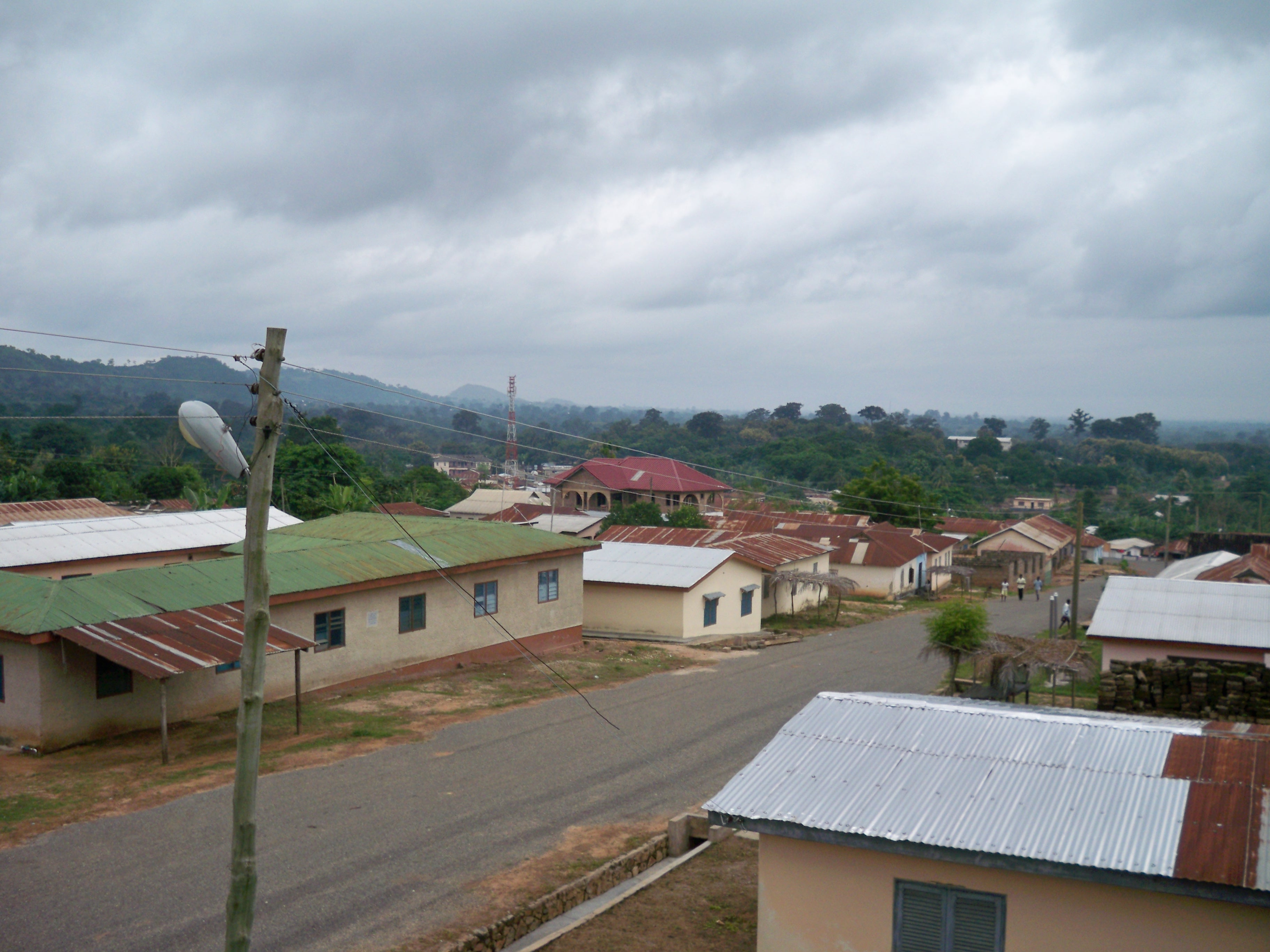
- Vakpo as seen from the E.P. chapel.
- Nickname: VK City
- Motto: Akple menya du nawó té lé vakpo
- Interactive map of Vakpo
- Country: Ghana
- Region: Volta Region
- District: North Dayi District

Government
  - Togbega Gbogbolulu v: Togbe Damankah
  - Togbe siffa: Togbe Akoni & Mama Dzomagbelatá
  - Togbe Dogbegá: Togbe Dobo & Mama Agoedza
- Elevation: 269 ft (82 m)
- Time zone: GMT
  - Summer (DST): GMT

Vakpo is a town in the North Dayi district, a district in the Volta Region of Ghana.Vakpo has about 14 suburbs namely Adomi,Tsorta,Gborxone,Dutanyigbe,Afeye,Dzogbati,Atsiame,Fodome,Dunyo,Todzi,New Adomi,Yordan,Fu and Konda is known for its beautiful landscape and fertile lands for farming over the years. Currently it holds one of the biggest mango plantations in Ghana and a fruit packaging factory located in New Adomi a suburb of Vakpo. The people of Vakpo celebrate Duawokpe festival in collaboration with other towns in recent days the youth initiated an annual Easter festival celebration which has attracted millions of visitors to witness the crowning of Miss Vakpo. Vakpo Senior High School (Vasec) and Vakpo Senior High Tech (Vastech) are currently the best in the district. The school is a second cycle institution.
