= Gbefi =

Gbefi Gbefi-Tornu
- Village
- Location of Nkonya Ahenkro
- Coordinates: 6°59′N 0°22′E
- Country: Ghana
- Region: Volta Region
- District: Kpando Municipal District
- Time zone: GMT
  - Summer (DST): GMT

Gbefi is a village in Kpando Municipal district, a district in the Volta Region of Ghana.

== See also ==
- Kpando Municipal District

== External links and sources ==
=== External links ===
- Kpando Municipal District on GhanaDistricts.com
