= Biakpa-Fume Electoral Area =

Electoral area in the Volta Region, Ghana

Biakpa-Fume is the largest electoral area in the Ho West District Assembly in the Volta Region of Ghana. This comprises five communities: Biakpa, Fume, Dzorkpe, Adahave and Tanve Bunya. The electoral area is within the Avatime Traditional Area

== Location ==
The Biakpa-Fume electoral area is bordered to the west by Nyangbo and Tafi, to the north by Logba Alakpeti.

== Assembly members ==
The current Assembly member for Biakpa-Fume is Gertrude Adzo Borklo.
