= North Dayi District =

North Dayi District Dayi-Nord
- District
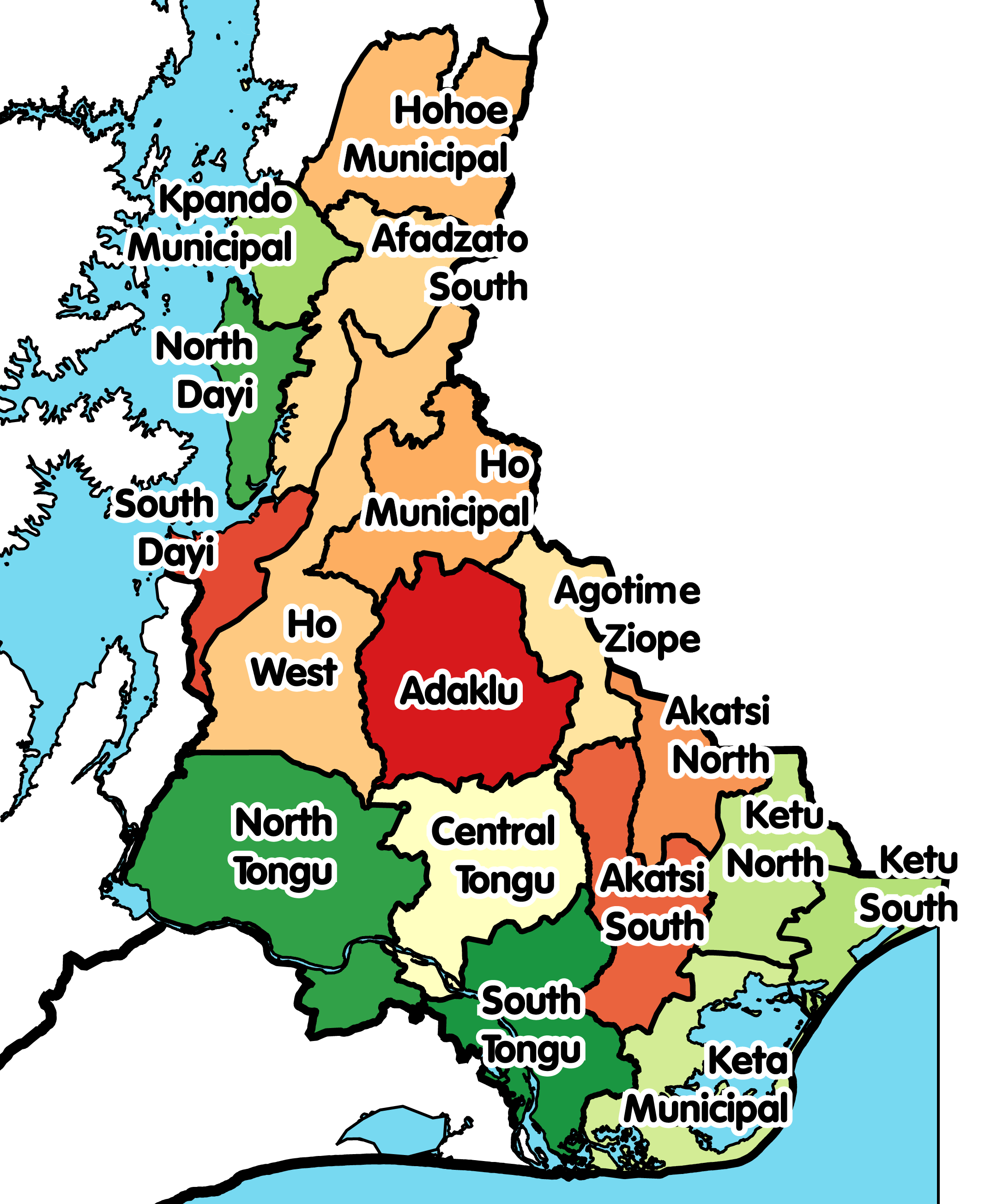
- Districts of Volta Region

- Location of North Dayi District within Volta
- Coordinates: 6°53′11″N 0°16′38.2″E
- Country: Ghana
- Region: Volta
- Capital: Anfoega

Government
  - District Executive: Hon. Edmund Kudjo Attah

Area
  - Total: 252 km^{2} (97 sq mi)

Population (2021)
  - Total: 39,268
  - Density: 156/km^{2} (404/sq mi)
- Time zone: UTC+0 (GMT)
- ISO 3166 code: GH-TV-ND

North Dayi District (a.k.a. Dayi Dzigbe or Dayi-Nord) is one of the eighteen districts in the Volta Region of Ghana. Originally it was part of the then-larger Kpando District until 10 March 1989. The southern part of the district was split off to create North Dayi District on 28 June,2012. Thus, the remaining part was elevated to municipal district assembly status to become Kpando Municipal District on the same year. The district assembly is located in the western part of Volta Region and has Anfoega as its capital town.

The North Dayi district has political and administrative structure.The North Dayi District, established in 2012 with its capital at Anfoega, is an administrative district in Ghana's Volta Region governed by the North Dayi District Assembly. It acts as the highest political and administrative authority, featuring a District Chief Executive (DCE), 23 elected members, 11 appointees, and 6 Area Councils to manage local development.

== List of settlements ==
The North Dayi District in the Volta Region of Ghana, with its capital at Anfoega, is characterized by a mix of highland and valley settlements along the Volta Lake. Key settlements include Anfoega, Vakpo, Wusuta, Botoku, Tsrukpe, Tsorxor, and Awate. The district is predominantly agrarian with many rural, mountainous communities.

=== Major settlements and areas ===
- Anfoega: District capital and major center.
- Vakpo: Key town and home to the District Health Directorate.
- Wusuta: Situated along the hilly terrain.
- Botoku: Known for its location near the Volta Lake.
- Tsrukpe: Located near the Volta Lake.
- Awate: Mountainous community.
- Tsorxor: Included within the District sub-structures.
- Aveme: Comprising areas like Aveme Beme and Tsyome-Sabadu.

=== Other rural communities ===
- Todzi
- Gborxome
- Fodome (Vakpo area)

The district is organized under six main Area Councils: Anfoega, Vakpo, Wusuta, Tsrukpe/Botoku/Tsorxor, Awate, and Aveme/Tsyome Sabadu.

== Towns ==
- Anfoega
- Vakpo
- Wusuta
- Tsrukpe
- Botoku
- Tsoxor
- Awate
- Aveme
- Tsyome Sabadu
