= Kpando =

- Town & District Capital
- Location in Ghana
- Coordinates: 7°0′N 0°18′E
- Country: Ghana
- Region: Volta Region
- District: Kpando Municipal District

Population (2012)
  - Total: 28,334
- Ranked 54th in Ghana
- Time zone: GMT
  - Summer (DST): GMT

Kpando is a town and capital of Kpando Municipal District in the northern Volta Region of Ghana. It is near the north eastern arm of Lake Volta and the Togo border. Kpando is the fifty-fourth most populous place in Ghana, in terms of population, with a population of 28,334 people. Kpando is connected by ferry and road to Gbefi, Hohoe, Ho and Dambai. It is about a 4-hour journey from Accra. The Kpando Municipality is a district in the Volta Region, and one of the oldest administrative districts in Ghana.

== History ==
The peoples of Kpando, also called the Akpini people, are Ewes believed to have been a part of the third wave of migrations from Notsé, while escaping from the rule of the tyrant Togbe Agorkoli about 450 years ago.
