= Abutia Kpota =

Farming community in Ghana

Abutia Kpota Abutia-Kpota
- Farming community
- Location in Ghana
- Coordinates: 6°33′24.1″N 0°25′38″E
- Country: Ghana
- Region: Volta Region
- District: Ho West District
- Time zone: GMT
  - Summer (DST): GMT

Abutia-Kpota is a farming community located at South-Western part of Ho, the capital town of Volta Region, Ghana. Abutia Kpota is one of the towns in the Ho West District. The town is near the Kalapa Re-source Reserve.

== History ==
Abutia Kpota is one of the numerous settler towns in the Abutia Traditional Area. The people of Abutia belong to the Eʋedome group of the Eʋes. Abutia has traditional towns which are Abutia Kloe, Abutia Kissifli and Abutia Teti.

As at 2025, the Chief of Abutia-Kpota is Togbe Tsali IV.

== Education ==
- Abutia-Kpota Evangelical Presbyterian Basic School or E.P Basic School

== Agriculture ==
The community produces cassava, maize, rice and vegetables such as okra. The Abutia Kpota farms which is an initiative of the National Service Scheme mainly deals in maize plantation.
