= Akpafu Rice Festival =

Festival in Ghana by the people of Akpafu

The Akpafu Rice Festival is an annual harvest festival celebrated by the chiefs and people of Akpafu in the Oti Region, formerly part of the Volta region of Ghana. It has been reported as variously being held in January, April and in June.

== Celebrations ==
During the festival, visitors are welcomed to share food and drinks. The people put on traditional clothes and there is durbar of chiefs. There is also dancing and drumming.
