= Abutia-Teti =

- Location in Ghana
- Coordinates: 6.5167°N 0.3667°E
- Country: Ghana
- Region: Volta Region

Abutia-Teti is a town in the Volta Region of Ghana. The town is known for the Abutia Secondary School.
