= Emmanuel Kwasi Bedzrah =

Ghanaian politician

Hon. Emmanuel Kwasi Bedzrah MP
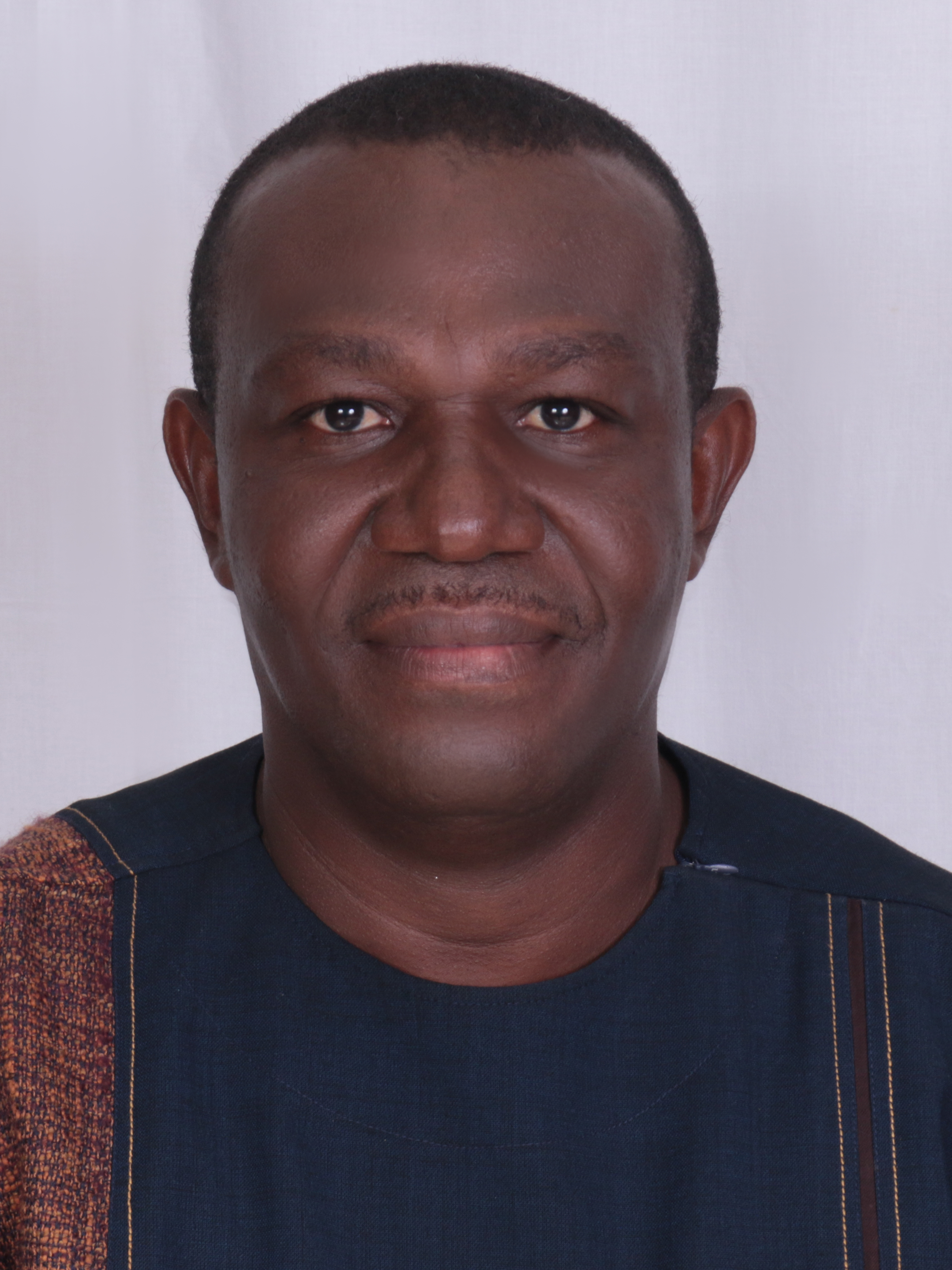

Member of the Ghana Parliament for Ho West Constituency
- Incumbent
- Assumed office 7 January 2009
- Preceded by: Francis Aggrey Agbotse

Personal details
- Born: 28 May 1967 (age 59) Ghana
- Party: National Democratic Congress
- Education: Takoradi Polytechnic; University of Ghana; Ghana Institute of Management and Public Administration

Emmanuel Kwasi Bedzrah is a Ghanaian politician and member of the Seventh Parliament of the Fourth Republic of Ghana representing the Ho West Constituency in the Volta Region on the ticket of the National Democratic Congress.

== Early life and education ==
Bedzrah was born on 28 May 1967. He hails from Tsito-Awudome, a town in the Volta Region of Ghana. He received his diploma as a Chartered Surveyor from the Ghana Institute of Surveyors. He also received his Construction Technicians Certificate I (CTC I) from the Takoradi Polytechnic and a Bachelor of Science degree in Administration from the University of Ghana. He holds a master's degree from Ghana Institute of Management and Public Administration (GIMPA).

== Career and politics ==
Prior to entering politics, Bedzrah was the chief executive officer of the Procurement and Project Management Consultancy.

He was elected to represent the Ho West constituency during the 2008 Ghanaian general election. He has been in parliament since 7 January 2009. In parliament, he has served on various committees, some of which include; Works and Housing Committee, and the Standing Orders Committee.

In 2021, Bedzrah together with Alexander Kwamena Afenyo-Markin, Abdul-Aziz Ayaba Musah, Johnson Kwaku Adu and Laadi Ayii Ayamba were sworn in during the Extraordinary Session 2021 of the Parliament of the ECOWAS which happened in Freetown in Sierra Leone.

== Personal life ==
Bedzrah is married with four children. He identifies as a Christian.
