= Akpafu-Todzi =

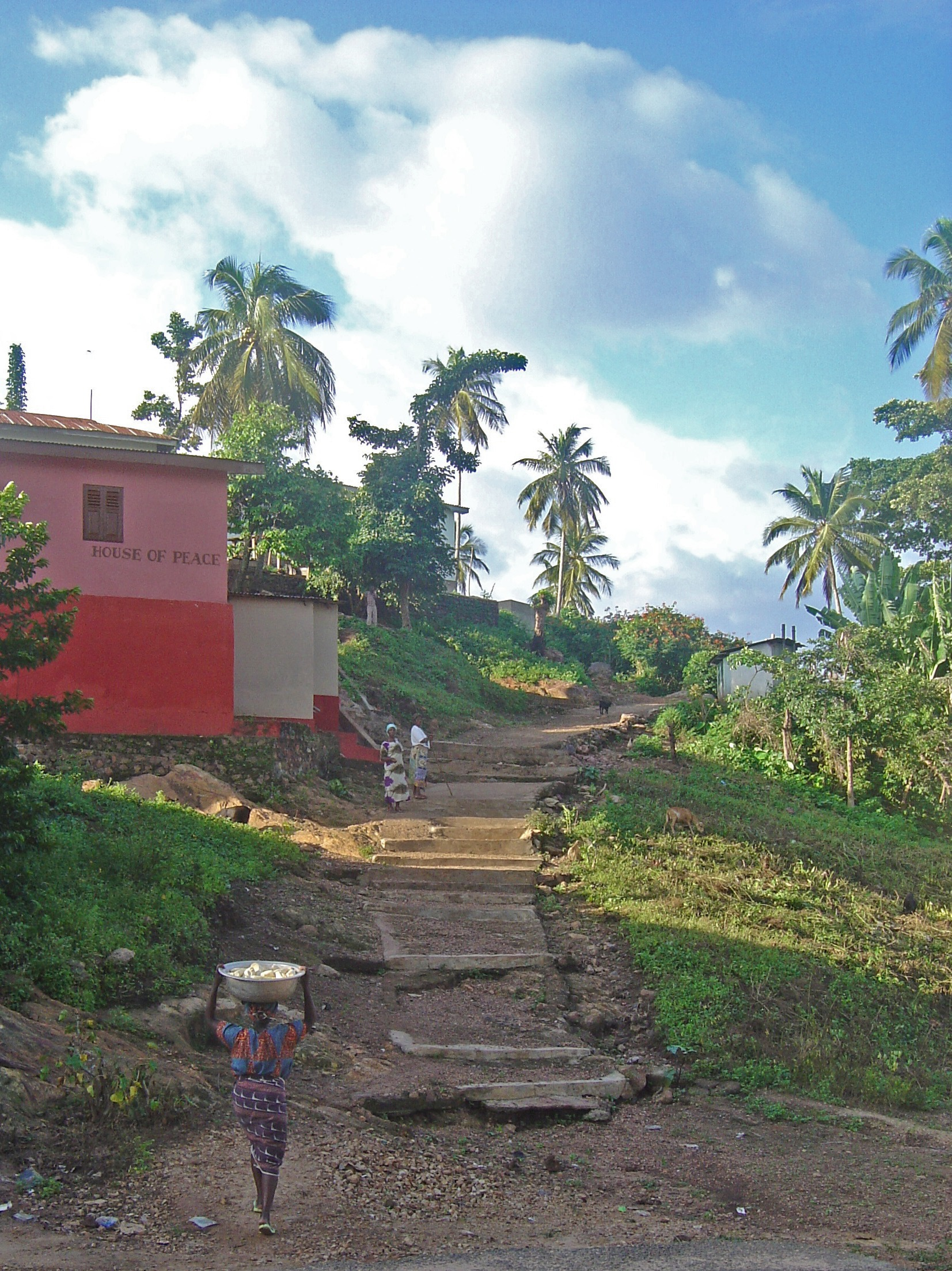
- View of the 'cemetery road' in Akpafu-Todzi

- Location in Ghana
- Coordinates: 7°15′18″N 0°29′28″E
- Country: Ghana
- Region: Oti Region
- District: Jasikan Municipality
- Elevation: 1,220 ft (372 m)
- Time zone: GMT

Akpafu-Todzi is a village in the Akpafu traditional area of the Jasikan Municipality District in the Oti Region of Ghana. The inhabitants of Todzi (around 600–700 in total) call themselves the Mawu and speak Siwu, a Kwa language that is quite distinct from the dominant regional languages Ewe and Twi. The Siwu name for the village is kaa i kato, or "home up high". The oldest of the five Akpafu villages, Todzi functions as the capital of the traditional area and its chief is the paramount chief of Akpafu.

In the past, Akpafu-Todzi was one of the sites of the traditional iron industry of the Akpafu people. Some ancient mines can still be visited in the vicinity of the village, but the iron industry collapsed in the late nineteenth century. Nowadays, the inhabitants of Todzi are mostly peasant farmers.

== External links and sources ==
- Jasikan District brochure See page 15
