= Sokode, Ghana =

Community in the Volta region of Ghana

Sokode
- Country: Ghana
- Region: Volta Region

Sokode is a community in the Ho municipality in the Volta region of Ghana. It is made up of five communities which include Sokode-Ando, Sokode-Etoe, Sokode-Bagble, Sokode-Gborgame and Sokode-Lokoe. The community has an estimated population of more than 40,000 people.

== Institution ==
The main campus of the University of Health and Allied Sciences (UHAS) is located in Sokode-Lokoe.
