= Ho West =

Constituency in Ghana

- constituency for the Parliament of Ghana
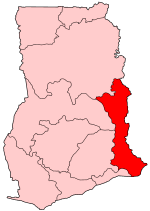
- District: Ho West District
- Region: Volta Region of Ghana

Current constituency
- Created: 2016
- Party: National Democratic Congress
- MP: Emmanuel Kwasi Bedzrah

Ho West is one of the constituencies represented in the Parliament of Ghana. It elects one Member of Parliament (MP) by the first past the post system of election. Ho West is located is in the Ho West District of the Volta Region of Ghana. Its capital is Dzolokpuita.

== Boundaries ==
The seat is located entirely within the Ho West District of the Volta Region of Ghana. It shade a common boundary with the Ho municipality to the south, the south Dayi to the north west and the Afadzato south to the north east. Ho West also stretches to its south eastern boundary with the Adaklu and the North Tongu district in there Volta region.

== Members of Parliament ==
First Republic
Ho West
First elected	Member	Party
1954	Kodzo Ayeke	Togoland Congress
1960	Hans Kofi Boni	Convention People's Party
Ho (Merger of Ho East and Ho West)
1965	Emmanuel Yaw Attigah	Convention People's Party
Second Republic
Ho West
1969	Felix Kwasi Adinyira	National Alliance of Liberals
Third Republic
1979	Samuel Yao Dzebu	People's National Party
Fourth Republic
1992	Lt. Col E.K.D. Anku-Tsede	National Democratic Congress
1996	Francis Aggrey Agbotse	National Democratic Congress
2008	Emmanuel Kwasi Bedzrah	National Democratic Congress

== Election results ==
2024 Ghanaian general election: Ho West
Party	Candidate	Votes	%	±%
NDC	Emmanuel Kwasi Bedzrah	28,110	83.90	+11.80
NPP	Eric Nick Yao Gonyuie	5,043	15.05	−10.45
NDP	Kukah Julius Jonathan	352	1.05	+0.85
Majority		23,067	68.85	+22.25
Turnout		33,775	—	—
Registered electors		—		

2020 Ghanaian general election: Ho West
Party	Candidate	Votes	%	±%
NDC	Emmanuel Kwasi Bedzrah	28,538	72.1	
NPP	David Togbe Kodjo Nfodjo	10,096	25.5	
Ghana Union Movement	Doris Ama Amewugah	692	1.8	
PPP	Joshua Kumah Akutey	116	0.3	
NDP	Julius Jonathan Kukah	79	0.2	
Great Consolidated Popular Party	Jackson Kwaku Tsevi	63	0.2	
Majority		18,442	46.6	
Turnout				—
Registered electors		51,360		

2016 Ghanaian general election: Ho West
Party	Candidate	Votes	%	±%
NDC	Emmanuel Kwasi Bedzrah	27,204	87.50	—
NPP	Isaac Kwame Adika	3,385	10.89	—
NDP	Johnson Melody Dedo	332	1.07	
CPP	Tetteh Edwin Harry	170	0.55	
PPP	Akutey Joshua Kumah	0	0.00	—
Majority		23,819	76.61	—
Turnout		—	—	—
Registered electors		—		

2012 Ghanaian general election: Ho West
Party	Candidate	Votes	%	±%
NDC	Emmanuel Kwasi Bedzrah	32,623	89.10	—
NPP	Ernest Yao Gaewu	3,014	8.23	—
NDP	Samuel Mawuli Apasu	789	2.15	—
CPP	Asigbey Eugene Herbert	187	0.51	—
Majority		29,609	80.87	—
Turnout		—	—	—
Registered electors		—		

2008 Ghanaian parliamentary election: Ho West
Party	Candidate	Votes	%	±%
NDC	Emmanuel Kwasi Bedzrah	24,677	87.46	—
NPP	Mawutor Goh	3,226	11.43	—
CPP	Foster Segbe	313	1.11	—
DFP	Deletsu Alfred	0	0.00	—
Majority				—
Turnout				—

2004 Ghanaian parliamentary election: Ho West
Party	Candidate	Votes	%	±%
NDC	Francis Aggrey Agbotse	26,065	82.5	4.4
NPP	Elizabeth Akua Ohene	5,346	16.9	14.9
EGLE	Ella Nancy Sifa	191	0.6	—
Majority		20,619	65.6	2.4
Turnout		31,740	87.9	—
Registered electors		36,120		

2000 Ghanaian parliamentary election: Ho West
Party	Candidate	Votes	%	±%
NDC	Francis Aggrey Agbotse	22,991	78.1	—
CPP	E. Kafui Asem	4,377	14.9	—
National Reform Party	Grace Adinyira	1,471	5.0	—
NPP	John Von Backustein	596	2.0	—
Majority		18,614	63.2	—
Registered electors		45,339		

== See also ==
- List of Ghana Parliament constituencies
