= Taviefe =

Taviefe Ohio City
- Country: Ghana
- Region: Volta Region

Taviefe is a town in the Volta Region of Ghana, approximately 15minutes east of Ho, the regional capital. It comprises eight major sub-towns: Dzafe, Tsetse, Aviefe, Avedome, Avenya, Dzefe, Sreme and Deme. The primary occupation of the residents is agriculture, leveraging the town's fertile land and natural water sources. Aviefe, situated on a hill, is colloquially known as "Ohio" due to its elevated location. Aviefe is also renowned for popularizing "borborbor" a traditional dance. Taviefe is home to Taviefe Secondary School, a second-cycle institution.
