= Ve-Koloenu =

Coordinates: 7°03′N 0°26′E

- Interactive map of Ve-Koloenu
- Country: Ghana
- Region: Volta Region

Ve-Koloenu is a town in the Volta Region of Ghana. The town is known for the Ve Commercial Secondary School. The school is a second cycle institution.
