= Eric Yirenkyi Danquah =

Ghanaian plant geneticist

- Awards: Distinguished Award for Meritorious Service from the University of Ghana (2013) World Agriculture Prize (2018) Outstanding Academic Leadership Award (2018) Africa Food Prize (2022) 100 Most Reputable Africans (2023)
- Scientific career
- Fields: Genetics, Crop Science, Biotechnology, Biosafety, Crop improvement, Plant Breeding, Food Security
- Institutions: University of Ghana, University of Cambridge, Long Ashton Research Station, Cornell University, Michigan State University

Eric Yirenkyi Danquah is a Ghanaian plant geneticist, professor, founding director of the West Africa Centre for Crop Improvement (WACCI) and former director of the Biotechnology Centre at the University of Ghana.

== Early life and education ==
Danquah attended Akosombo Experimental School (1964-1972), and the Presbyterian Boys Secondary School (PRESEC) in Legon (1972-1979). He graduated with a BSc in Agriculture (Crop Science) from the University of Ghana in 1984. He then worked as an intern at a dairy and cereals farm in Germany, before returning to Ghana to complete his national service with the Ghana Education Service. He completed an MPhil in plant breeding at the Department of Applied Biology at the University of Cambridge on a Cambridge Commonwealth Trust Shared Scholarship.

In November 1987, he returned to Ghana and worked for two years in the Department of Crop Science at the University of Ghana, before returning to the University of Cambridge in October 1989 as a Commonwealth Scholar for his PhD research in the laboratory of John Barrett in the Department of Genetics, which he completed in June 1993.

== Research ==
Following his PhD, Danquah worked as a research scientist at Plant Breeding International in Cambridge, where he researched maize-wheat intercrosses and contributed to the international barley genome mapping project.

In February 1994, he was appointed lecturer in the Department of Crop Science at the University of Ghana. He was promoted to senior lecturer in 2001, associate professor in 2004 and full professor in 2007. He held the positions of Head of the Department of Crop Science from 2005 to 2006, and Dean of International Programmes from 2006 to 2009.

Danquah’s research centres on genetic diversity in crop plants and their associated pests, with an emphasis on molecular genetics and biotechnology for crop improvement. He also focuses on farmer's knowledge and plant breeding, technologies for food security in Africa, and training the next generation of research scientists.

From 2000-2001, he developed Simple Sequence Repeats (Microsatellites) for Echinochloa species as a visiting scientist at the Long Ashton Research Station (UK). He was also a visiting scientist at Cornell University in May 2005 and May 2006, and partnered with them to set up the West Africa Centre for Crop Improvement in 2007.

His teaching has included Introductory Genetics, Principles of Biotechnology, Genetics and Plant Breeding, Molecular Genetics and Population Genetics in the College of Agriculture and Consumer Sciences. He has co-supervised more than 20 post-graduate and PhD students. In 2006, at Michigan State University, he developed a curriculum for Biosafety in Biotechnology, for training of students and scientists in West Africa.

=== West Africa Centre for Crop Improvement (WACCI) ===
In 2007, Danquah became the Founding Director of the West Africa Centre for Crop Improvement (WACCI) at the University of Ghana, with the "aim of training a new generation of plant breeders to develop improved varieties of staple crops in West and Central Africa". In its first ten years, WACCI attracted more than $30M US dollars of R&D funding, and trained more than 120 PhD and 49 MPhil students in Seed Science and Technology from 19 African countries. This led to more than 60 improved seed varieties, including superior maize hybrid varieties, which will help boost yield for farmers and contribute towards food and nutrition security.

== Awards and recognition ==
In 2020, he was selected to serve on the board of the Innovation Lab for Crop Improvement established by the United States Agency for International Development.

Danquah is the recipient of many awards, including the Distinguished Award for Meritorious Service from the University of Ghana in 2013, and the Global Confederation of Higher Education Associations for Agriculture and Life Sciences (GCHERA) World Agriculture Prize in 2018 for his "significant contribution to the mission of the University of Ghana through education, research and knowledge transfer for the benefit of society". In 2018, Danquah was awarded the Outstanding Academic Leadership Award in recognition of his contribution to the development of agribusiness in Africa by the Chamber of Agribusiness Ghana. In 2022, Danquah received the Africa Food Prize, which is awarded to institutions or individuals who play a leading role in changes to farming in Africa. In 2023, Danquah was named one of the "100 Most Reputable Africans" by the Reputation Poll International.

He has held many honorary and advisory positions, including:

- President of the African Plant Breeders Association
- Member of the Business and Executive, Finance and Estimates Committees, and Assessor for Sciences on the Appointments Board of the University of Ghana
- Member of the International Atomic Energy Agency (IAEA) Standing Advisory Group for Nuclear Applications (SAGNA)
- Africa’s representative on the Maize Genetics Executive Committee
- Member of the Centre of Specialisation Management Committee of the West Africa Agricultural Productivity Programme
- Advisor for the Science Council of the Consultative Group of International Agricultural Research (CGIAR), the Food and Agriculture Organization (FAO), the International Fund for Agricultural Development (IFAD), and the United States Agency for International Development (USAID)
- Chairperson of the Board of Advisory for Samira Empowerment and Humanitarian Projects (SEHP)
