= Ziavi =

Town in Volta Region, Ghana

- Town
- Location of Ziavi in Volta Region
- Coordinates: 06°37′2.998″N 00°12′55.841″E
- Country: Ghana
- Region: Volta Region
- District: Ho Municipal District
- Time zone: UTC0 (GMT)

Ziavi also known as the "Green Valley City" is a traditional area in the Ho Municipality in the Volta Region of Ghana. Ziavi has four (4) communities namely; Dzogbe, Lume, Adukope and Bamefedo. Dzogbe is the capital of the Ziavi Traditional area and is the seat of the paramount chief.

As at 2021, the Paramount Chief of Ziavi Traditional Area and President of Ziavi Traditional Council was the late Togbe Kwaku Ayim IV. The Traditional area is also known for the Ziavi Senior High Technical School. Farming is the primary occupation of the people of Ziavi and they are best known for the production of coffee. In the local Ewe dialect, powdered coffee is known as Ziavi-tutui (Ziavi-powder). Zigi; the popular Ewe music, was originated by Mr. E.N.K. Akorli and Mr. William Dake who were natives of Ziavi. The very first Zigi troupe was formed in Ziavi between the late 1970s and the early 1980s. The troupe will go on to capture the admiration of the entire country and also feature on international arts and literary works like the Cobra Verde movie.

== Institutions ==
- Ziavitutui Coffee and Beverage Company Limited
- Ziavi Health Centre
- Ziavi Senior High Technical School (ZISTECH)
