= Amu Festival =

Ghanan annual harvest festival

Amu or the Rice Festival is an annual harvest festival celebrated by the chiefs and people of Vane which is the traditional capital of the Avatime people. It is located in the Ho West District in the Volta Region of Ghana. It is usually celebrated in the last week in the month of November to December. Others also claim it is celebrated around September or October.

== Celebrations ==
There is drumming, dancing and singing during the festival.

== Significance ==
The festival is celebrated on the harvesting of brown rice as its name implies. The people claimed they migrated from the Ahanta areas in the Western region and fought for the place they are now occupy from the original people.
