= Afadzato South District =

District in Ghana

Afadzato South District Afadzato Sud
- District
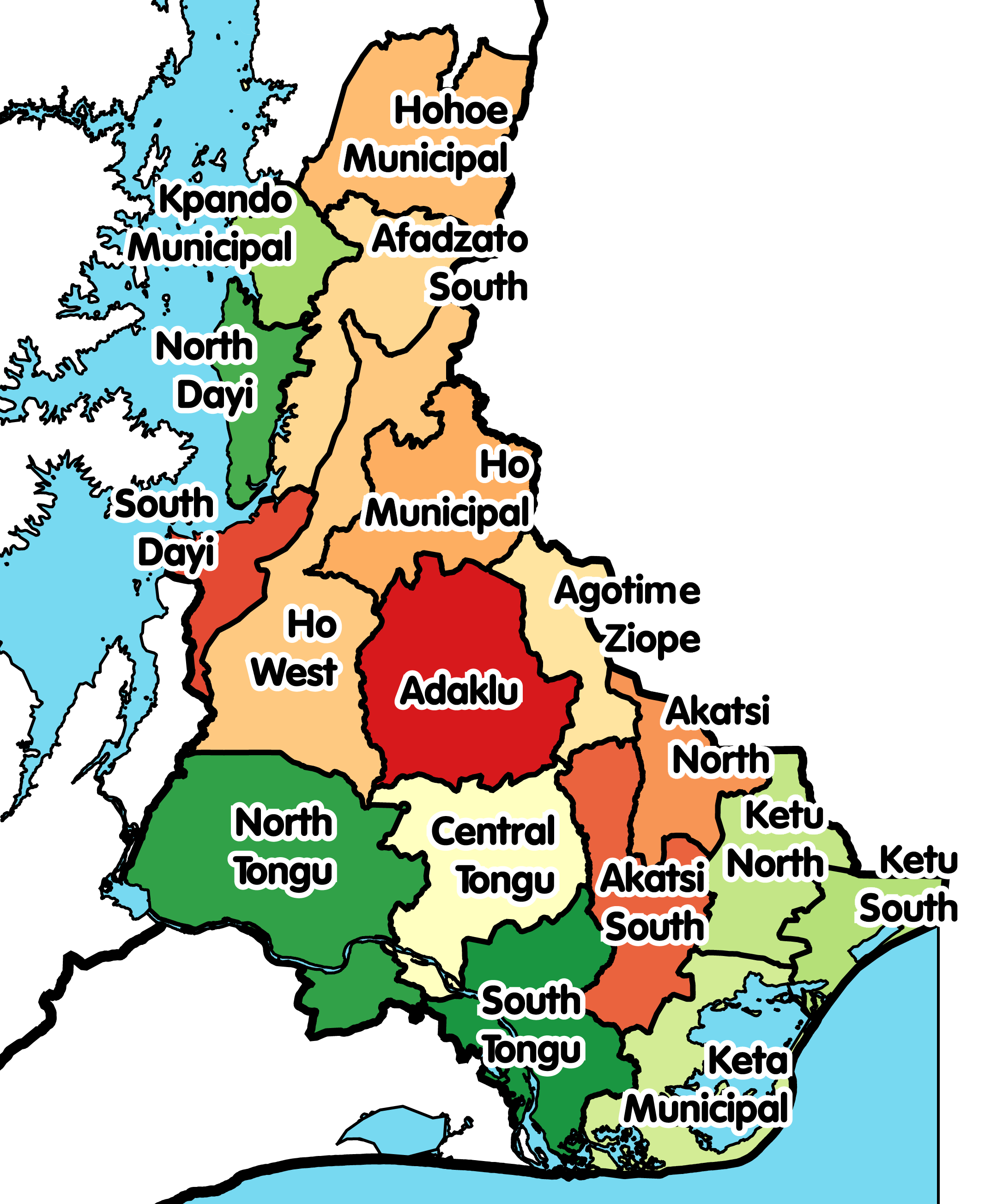
- Districts of Volta Region

- Location of Afadzato South District within Volta
- Coordinates: 6°59′32.12″N 0°25′32.12″E
- Country: Ghana
- Region: Volta
- Capital: Ve Golokwati

Government
  - District Executive: Hon. James Etornam Flolu

Population (2021)
  - Total: 73,146
- Time zone: UTC+0 (GMT)
- ISO 3166 code: GH-TV-AF
- Website: http://afadzatosouthdistrictgh.com/6/download-documents-from-afadjato-south-district-assembly

Afadzato South District (a.k.a. Afadzato Anyigbe) is one of the eighteen districts in Volta Region, Ghana. Originally it was formerly part of the then-larger Hohoe District on 10 March 1989, until the southern part of the district was split off to create Afadzato South District on 28 June 2012; thus the remaining portion has been retained as Hohoe Municipal District. The district assembly is located in the northern part of Volta Region and has Ve Golokwati as its capital town.

== Geography ==
The District shares boundaries with Hohoe Municipal District to the north, Kpando Municipal District to the west, to the east with the Togo and to the south with Ho West District and South Dayi District respectively.

== Villages ==
- Have
- Ve-Golokuati
- Ve-Kolenu
- Ve-Gbodome
- Ve-Hoeme
- Ve Deme
- Ve-Agbome
- Ve-Dafor
- Ve-Wudome
- Nyagbo-Agordome
- Nyagbo-Akofafanami
- Nyagbo-Anyigbe
- Nyagbo-Emli Israel
- Nyagbo-Fiafe
- Nyagbo-Gagbefe
- Nyagbo-Konda
- Nyagbo-Kume
- Nyagbo-Odumase
- Nyagbo-Sroe
- Leklebi-Agbesia
- Leklebi-Asortodzi
- Leklebi-Blemiado
- Leklebi-Dafor
- Leklebi-Duga
- Leklebi-Fiafe
- Leklebi-Heheme
- Leklebi Kame
- Leklebi-Liata
- Leklebi-Wobe
- Liati-Agbatiave
- Liati-Agboglidome
- Liati-Agbonyra
- Liati-Avetome
- Liati-Dafornu
- Liati-Dalekpedzi
- Liati-Datem
- Liati-Odumasi
- Liati-Peterkofe
- Liati-Sawali
- Liati Soba
- Liati-Tadzi
- Liati-Teikrom
- Liati-Torganu
- Liati-Wote
- Logba-Adiveme
- Logba-Adzakoe
- Logba-Akusame
- Logba-Alakpeti
- Logba-Andokope
- Logba-Dufie
- Logba-Klikpo
- Logba-Tota
- Logba-Vuinta
- Logba-Xorglikope
- Tafi-Abuipe
- Tafi-Agorme
- Tafi-Atome
- Tafi-Dekpokorfe
- Tafi-Mador
- Tafi-Xorglikorfe
- Kpeve-Old Town
- Kpeve-Tornu
- Adigbo-Tornu
- Goviefe-Todzi
- Goviefe-Korwu
- Goviefe-Agordome
- Woadze
- Woadze-Tornu
- Woadze-Kokomba Korfe
- Woadze Tsatoe
- Agate

Population and Distribution

The total population of the District according to the 2021 Population and Housing Census is about 73,146 with the male population numbering approximately 36,081 representing 49.3 percent and the female population numbering 37,065 constituting the remaining 50.7 percent. The population of the District forms 4.4 percent of the Regional population. The District has majority of its people in the rural areas (83.6%) compared to (16.4%) in the urban areas.

== Sources ==
- "Districts of Ghana". Statoids.
