= Kpeve New Town =

Kpeve Kpeve New Town
- District Capital
- Location in Ghana
- Coordinates: 6°41′1″N 0°20′1″E
- Country: Ghana
- Region: Volta Region
- District: South Dayi District
- Elevation: 188 m (617 ft)
- Time zone: GMT
  - Summer (DST): GMT
- Area code: +233 36 20

Kpeve New Town is a small town located in Kpeve, which is also the capital of South Dayi district, a district in the Volta Region of Ghana. Kpeve New Town became a district capital on the 24th of August 2004 during the inauguration of the South Dayi District.

== See also ==
- South Dayi (Ghana parliament constituency)
