= Simon Edem Asimah =

Ghanaian politician

MP for South Dayi
- In office 7 January 2009 – 7 January 2013
- President: John Evans Atta Mills

Personal details
- Born: 19 March 1955 (age 71) Peki Wudome, Volta Region Gold Coast (now Ghana)
- Party: National Democratic Congress
- Children: 5
- Education: The Hague Academy of International Law
- Occupation: Politician
- Profession: Architect

Simon Edem Asimah is a Development Planner and a politician of the Republic of Ghana. He was the member of Parliament for South Dayi in the Volta region of Ghana.

== Personal life ==
Simon is married with five children. He is a Christian (Evangelical Presbyterian).

== Early life and education ==
Simon Edem Asimah was born on 19 March 1955. He is an indegene of Peki-Wudome in the Volta region of Ghana.

He had a Master of Arts degree in Development Studies. He further studied ISS in the Hague in Netherlands in the year 1992.

== Politics ==
Simon is a member of the National Democratic Congress. He represented South Dayi Constituency in the 5th Parliament of the 4th Republic. In December 2012, He also emerged winner in the 2012 Ghanaian General Elections with a massive win of 87.5% of the total valid votes in his Constituency which became his second run as the MP for South Dayi. He was the Chairman of the Committee on Environment, Science and Technology.

== Employment ==
Reg. Director, Greater Accra Regional Office of Community Water and Sanitation Agency.

He is a Development Planner, an architect, and quantity surveyors.
