= Plant geneticist =

Scientist who studies the gentics of plants

A plant geneticist is a scientist involved with the study of genetics in botany. Typical work is done with genes in order to isolate and then develop certain plant traits. Once a certain trait, such as plant height, fruit sweetness, or tolerance to cold, is found, a plant geneticist works to improve breeding methods to ensure that future plant generations possess the desired traits.

Plant genetics played a key role in the modern-day theories of heredity, beginning with Gregor Mendel's study of pea plants in the 19th century. The occupation has since grown to encompass advancements in biotechnology that have led to greater understanding of plant breeding and hybridization. Commercially, plant geneticists are sometimes employed to develop methods of making produce more nutritious, or altering plant pigments to make the food more enticing to consumers.
