= Woyiram Boakye-Danquah =

Ghanaian politician

Woyram Boachie-Danquah

District Chief Executive South Dayi District
- In office 2005–2009
- President: John Kufuor
- Preceded by: Inaugural
- Succeeded by: Kafui Bekui
- Constituency: South Dayi

Personal details
- Born: Ghana
- Party: New Patriotic Party
- Education: University of Ghana
- Profession: Administrator

Woyram Boakye-Danquah is an Administrator and the former District Chief Executive of the South Dayi District in the Volta Region of Ghana.

Boakye-Danquah worked in various administrative roles prior to engaging in politics. She was nominated by President John Kufuor in 2005 for the position of District Chief Executive of the newly created South Dayi District. She remained in this position until the Kufuor government was replaced following the Ghanaian presidential election in December 2008. She was subsequently replaced with Kafui Bekui, a fish scientist, in 2009 by President Mills.

== See also ==
- South Dayi District

Political offices
New title	South Dayi District Chief Executive; 2005 – 2009	Succeeded by Kafui Bekui
