= Ho West District =

District in Volta Region, Ghana

Ho West District Ho Ouest
- District
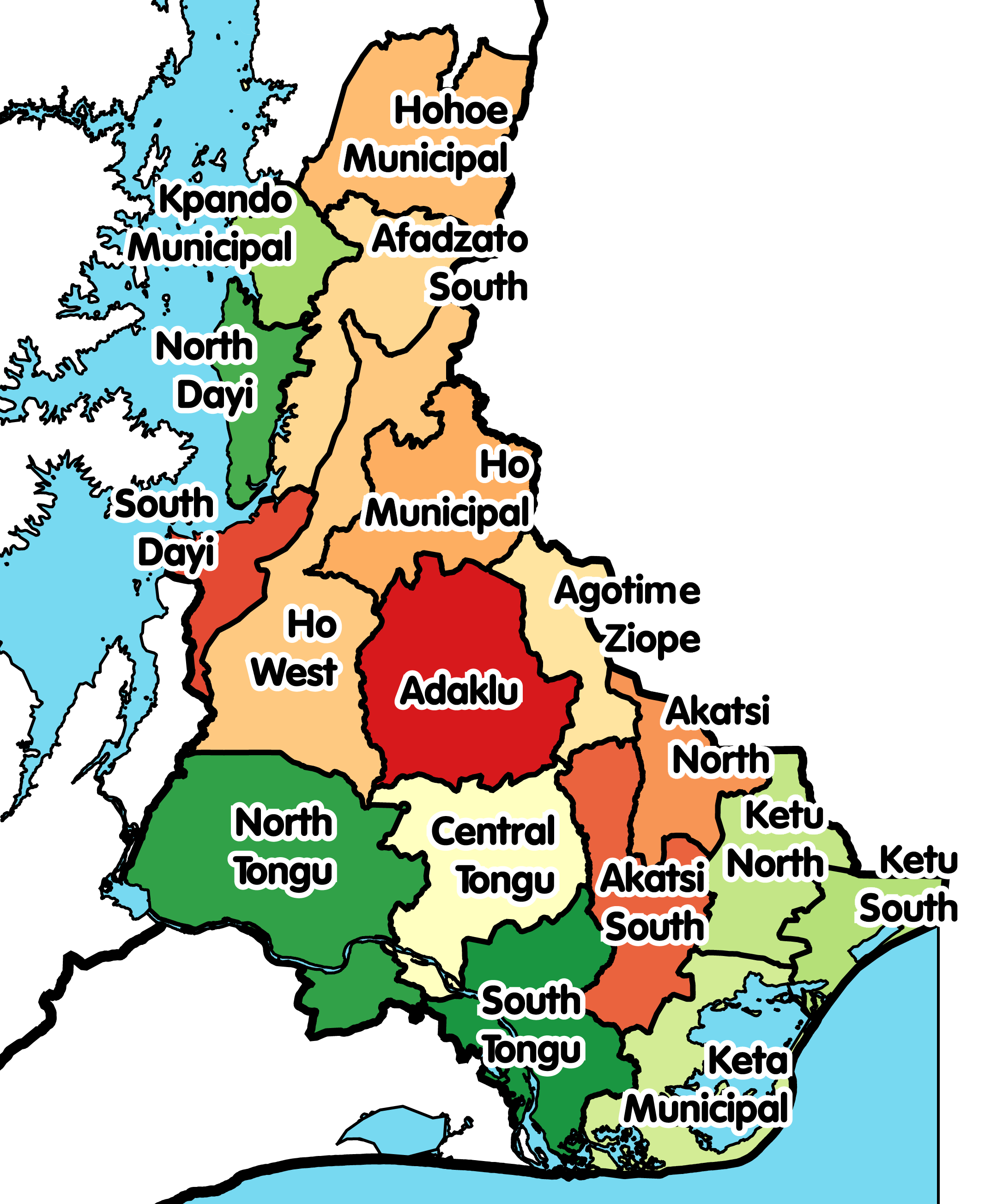
- Districts of Volta Region

- Location of Ho West District within Volta
- Coordinates: 6°47′10.2″N 0°26′37.5″E
- Country: Ghana
- Region: Volta
- Capital: Dzolokpuita

Government
  - District Executive: Hon. Ernest Apaw

Area
  - Total: 992 km^{2} (383 sq mi)

Population (2021)
  - Total: 82,886
  - Density: 83.6/km^{2} (216/sq mi)
- Time zone: UTC+0 (GMT)
- ISO 3166 code: GH-TV-HW

Ho West District is one of the eighteen districts in Volta Region, Ghana. It was formerly part of the then-larger Ho District, created on 10th March,1989. The Ho West District was created on the 28th of June 2012 when the western part of the Ho District was split off; thus the remaining part was elevated to municipal district assembly status, in that same year to become Ho Municipal District. The district assembly is located in the central part of Volta Region and has Dzolokpuita as its capital town.

Plans are already underway to split the Ho West District, due to slow development, large size and extreme length, stretching several kilometers from the north of the North Tongu District to the northern part of the Afadzato South District

== Administration ==
Ho West District covers the same area as the Ho West Constituency.

== Boundaries ==
The North Tongu District is to the south of the Ho West District and the Asuogyaman District to the south west. To the north is the Afadzato South District. The Ho Municipality, Adaklu District and the Republic of Togo are east of the district and the South Dayi District to the west.

== Towns and villages ==
The following is a list of towns and villages found in the district.

- Abutia Kissiflui
- Abutia Kloe
- Abutia Kpota
- Abutia-Teti
- Amedzofe
- Anfoeta Agorkpo
- Anfoeta Tsebi
- Anyirawase
- Ashanti Kpoeta
- Avenui
- Dededo
- Dzogbefeme
- Hlefi
- Bame
- Bakpe
- Dzolo Gbogame
- Dzolokpuita (capital)
- Kpedze
- Saviefe Agorkpo
- Saviefe Gbogame
- Tsawenu
- Tsibu
- Tsito
- Vane

== See also ==
- Biakpa-Fume Electoral Area
