= Kpando Municipal District =

Municipal District in Volta Region, Ghana

- Municipal District
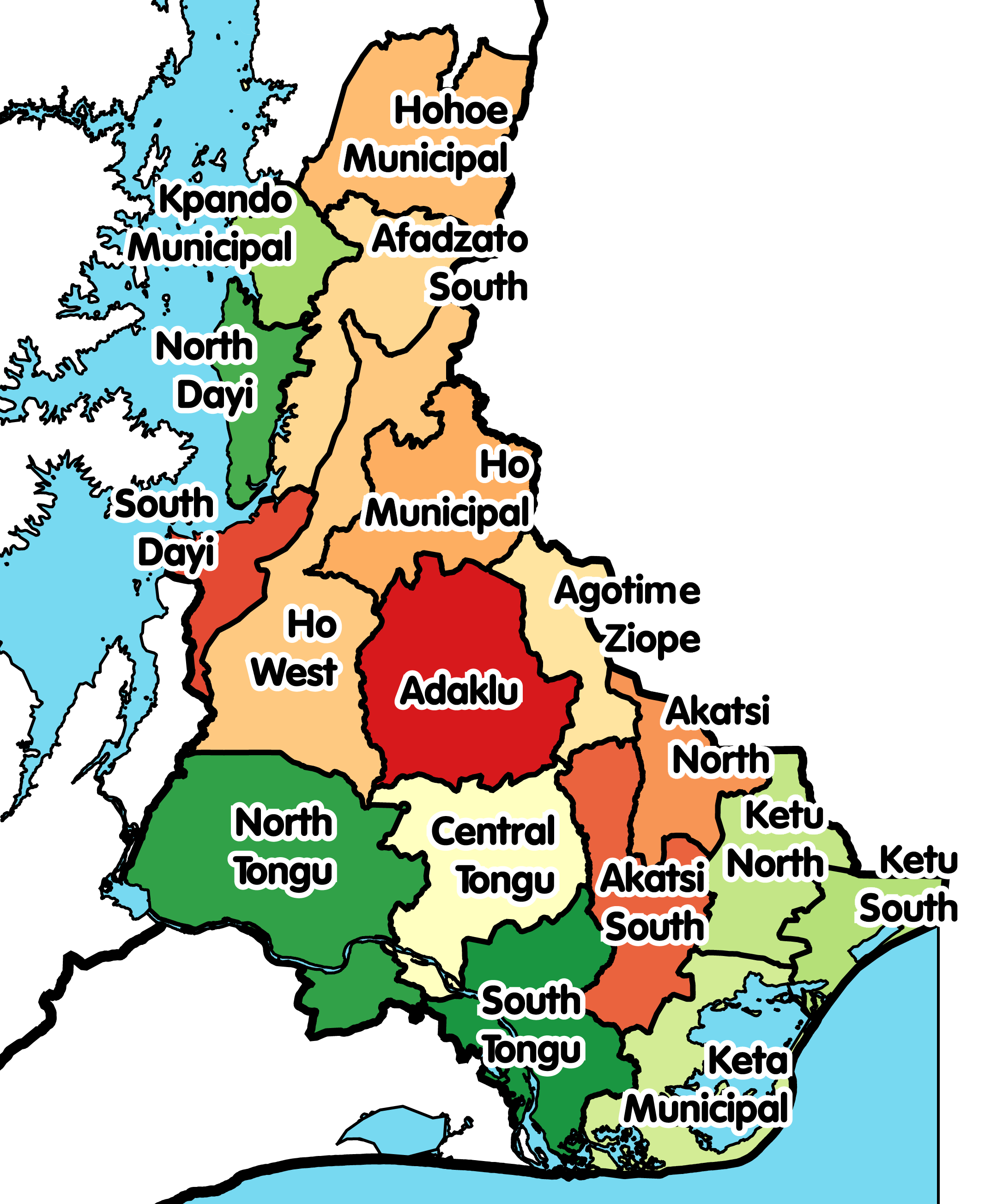
- Districts of Volta Region

- Location of Kpando Municipal District within Volta
- Coordinates: 6°59′31″N 0°17′42″E
- Country: Ghana
- Region: Volta
- Capital: Kpando

Government
  - Municipal Chief Executive: Hon. Geoffrey Kodso Badasu

Area
  - Total: 226 km^{2} (87 sq mi)

Population (2021)
  - Total: 58,552
  - Density: 259/km^{2} (671/sq mi)
- Time zone: UTC+0 (GMT)
- ISO 3166 code: GH-TV-KP

Kpando Municipal District is one of the eighteen districts in Volta Region, Ghana. Originally created as district assembly on 10 March 1989 when it was known as , the southern part of the district was split off by a decree of president John Agyekum Kufuor on 19 August 2004 to create South Dayi District; thus the remaining part has been retained as Kpando District. However on 28 June 2012, the southern part of the district was later split off to create North Dayi District on 28 June 2012; while the remaining part was elevated to municipal district assembly status on the same year to become Kpando Municipal District. The municipality is located in the western part of Volta Region and has Kpando as its capital town.

== Background ==
Kpando, the municipal district capital, is about 70 km from Ho, the regional capital. The location of the Municipality places it at a strategic position with potential for fast economic growth and development. The municipality lies within Latitudes 6° 20’ N and 7° 05’ N, and Longitude 0° 17’ E. The Volta Lake, which stretches over 80 km of the coastal line, demarcates the western boundary. The Kpando Municipality shares boundaries with Biakoye District in the north, Afajato South District to the East and North Dayi District in the south.

The population of the Municipality according to 2010 population and housing census stands at 53,736 with 25,904 males and 27,832 females. Kpando Municipal is one of the oldest districts in the Volta Region of Ghana which span into the current Oti Region. Kpando Tokor is a fishing community along the Lake Volta. It also serve as a point to crossing the Lake Volta to Afram plains and other nearby villages using outboard motor powered boats or the government operated pontoon.

== Boundaries ==
Kpando Municipal District is bounded by:

- the Lake Volta to the west,
- Afadzato South to the East,
- Biakoye District to the north, and
- North Dayi District to the south.

== Villages ==
In addition to Kpandu, the capital town and Administrative Centre made up of Kpando Gabi, Kpando Tsakpe and Kpando Aloyi, the Kpando Municipal District contains the following villages:

- Kpando Agbenoxoe
- Kpando Agudzi
- Kpando Aziave
- Kpando Bame
- Kpando Dafor
- Kpando Dzewoe
- Kpando Dzigbe
- Kpando Dzoanti
- Kpando Fesi
- Kpando Gadza
- Kpando Konda
- Avetikofe (Kpando)
- Tokor (Kpando)
- Gbefi Hoeme
- Gbefi Tonu
- Sovie
- Kudzra

== Tertiary Institutions ==
- Margaret Marquart Catholic Nursing Training College

== Senior High Schools ==
- Bishop Herman College
- Kpando Senior High School
- Kpando Technical School

== Hospitals ==
- Margaret Marquart Catholic Hospital
- St. Patrick's Hospital

== Sources ==
- "Districts of Ghana". Statoids.
- GhanaDistricts.com
