= Boso, Ghana =

Boso
- Village
- Location within Ghana
- Coordinates: 6°33′N 0°10′W
- Country: Ghana
- Region: Eastern Region
- District: Asuogyaman District
- Elevation: 974 ft (297 m)
- Time zone: GMT
  - Summer (DST): GMT

Boso is a small town in Asuogyaman District of the Eastern Region of Ghana, across from the Volta Lake.

The beautiful settlement lies between two mountains and is close to the volta lake. The inhabitants are mostly Guan speaking. The majority of the populace are Christians, with a small minority practicing traditional African religions.
