= Dzolokpuita =

- District Capital
- Location in Ghana
- Coordinates: 6°47′10.2″N 0°26′37.5″E
- Country: Ghana
- Region: Volta Region
- District: Ho West District

Area
  - Land: 700 sq mi (1,800 km^{2})

Population (2012)
  - Total: 100,000
- Time zone: GMT
  - Summer (DST): GMT

Dzolokpuita is the capital of the Ho West District. It is one of the districts of the Volta Region, Ghana.
