= Kafui Bekui =

Ghanaian politician

Semenu Kafui Bekui
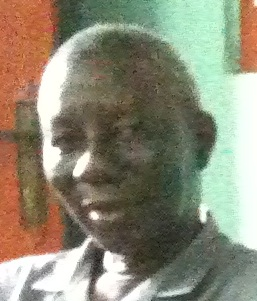

District Chief Executive South Dayi District
- In office July 2009 – November 2017
- President: John Atta Mills
- Preceded by: Woyiram Boakye-Danquah
- Succeeded by: Ernest Kojo Mallett

Personal details
- Born: Ghana
- Party: National Democratic Congress
- Profession: Fish scientist

Semenu Kafui Bekui is a Ghanaian civil servant, and a former district chief executive of the South Dayi District in the Volta Region of Ghana.

Kafui Bekui worked as a fish scientist with the Ministry of Food and Agriculture in Ghana before going into politics. He was based at the Volta Regional Agricultural Development Programme (VORADEP) at Ho. He was nominated for the position of District Chief Executive by President John Atta Mills after Mills' initial nominee, Perpetual Grace Annan, was rejected by the South Dayi District Assembly. Bekui was given his Instrument of Appointment formally at Ho in July 2009 by the regional minister, Joseph Amenowode. He was replaced as District Chief Executive by Ernest Kojo Mallett in November 2017.

Political offices
| Preceded by Woyiram Boakye-Danquah | District Chief Executive South Dayi District; 2009 - 2017 | Succeeded by Ernest Kojo Mallett |
