= Ghana Post GPS =

Smartphone app

GhanaPostGPS is a web and smartphone application, sponsored by the government of Ghana and developed by Vokacom, to provide a digital addresses and postal codes for every 5 squared meter location in Ghana. The digital address is a composite of the postcode (region, district & area code) plus a unique address.

GhanaPostGPS is the first digital addressing system created by the government of Ghana. GhanaPost GPS is a mandatory requirement for obtaining the National Identification Card and other services.

== See also ==
- Postal codes in Ghana
