= Tsito =

Coordinates: 6°32′N 0°17′E

Tsito Tsito main town is made up of seven clans. These are Tsanodza, Tsanodome, Tsanoanyigbe, Norni, Zorgbe, Awatey and Awalime
- Interactive map of Tsito
- Country: Ghana
- Region: Volta Region

Tsito is a town in the Volta Region of Ghana.

Tsito means 'by water' or 'by the river' In the Eʋe language. It is also a settlement discovered after a migratory exploit of its founders, when they were trying to erect a police post for the paramountcy of Awudome traditional area. Tsito has eight clans. They include Tsanoanyigbe, Tsanodza, Tsanodome, Avalime, Awate, Awakpe, Zorgbe and Norni. There are 2 secondary schools in Tsito.
