= Kpedze =

Town in Volta Region, Ghana

Coordinates: 6°50′N 0°30′E

- Interactive map of Kpedze
- Country: Ghana
- Region: Volta Region

Kpedze is a town in the western part of the Ho Municipality in the Volta Region of Ghana. The town is known for the Kpedze Secondary School. The school is a second cycle institution.

== Geography ==
It is located at an elevation of 228 meters above sea level and its population amounts to 26,909. Its coordinates are 6°49'60" N and 0°30'0" E in DMS (Degrees Minutes Seconds) or 6.83333 and 0.5 (in decimal degrees). Its UTM position is BH25 and its Joint Operation Graphics reference is NB31-05.

The place is about 7 km east of Amedzofe, at the foot of the mountain range. The name of the town originates from the word (kpe = bullet; dze = give way, Or step aside. "bullets gives away" : They are Warriors who Walks and forth through bullets during wars. "Aʋatukpedzea wo" ). In the Eʋe language. Kpedze is also known as The lemea wo. Kpedze has its sub communities known as Kpedze "Awlime", Kpedze "Sreme", Kpedze Todze and Kpedze Anoe. Kpedze town is predominantly known for the production of red palm oil and a lot of other cash crops.
