= Kpalikpakpa zã =

Festival in Ghana by the people of Kpalime

The Kpalikpakpa zã or Kpalikpakpa festival is an annual festival celebrated by the chiefs and people of the Kpalime Traditional Area located in the Volta Region of Ghana. The name of the festival is derived from an appellation in Ewe which is "Kpalikpakpa si tu makpata" which means "shooting without recording". The festival is meant to remind the Kpalime people of the valour of their ancestors during wars in the ancient days.

The festival was first held in November 1997 and has been held every year since then. The paramount chief of the area at the time was Togbega Asio XI of Kpale. The first festival was at Wegbe Kpalime. It has been rotated between the towns in the district since then. The eighth celebration was hosted at Kpale in November 2004. The 17th edition of the festival was celebrated in November 2012 at Kaira.

== External source ==
- Ghana Home Page
