= South Dayi District =

South Dayi District Dayi-Sud
- District
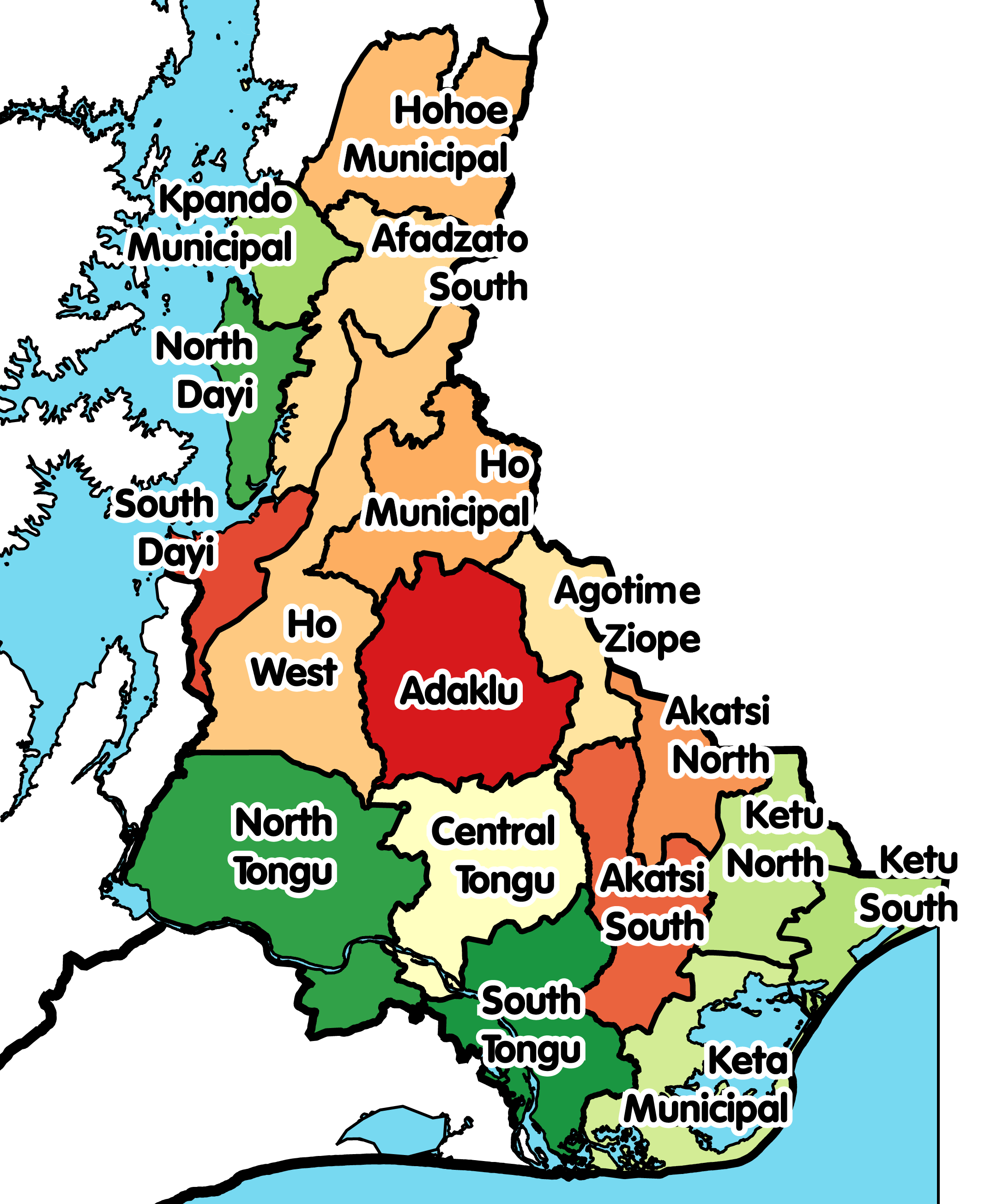
- Districts of Volta Region

- Location of South Dayi District within Volta
- Coordinates: 6°41′1″N 0°20′1″E
- Country: Ghana
- Region: Volta
- Capital: Kpeve

Government
  - District Executive: Courage Kwame Kokroko

Area
  - Total: 236 km^{2} (91 sq mi)

Population (2021)
  - Total: 57,526
  - Density: 244/km^{2} (631/sq mi)
- Time zone: UTC+0 (GMT)
- ISO 3166 code: GH-TV-SD
- Website: Official Website

South Dayi District is one of the eighteen districts in Volta Region, Ghana. Originally it was part of the then-larger Kpando District created on 10 March 1989, until the southern part of the district was split off by a decree of president John Agyekum Kufuor on 19 August 2004 to create South Dayi District; thus the remaining part has been retained as Kpando District (which it was elevated to municipal district assembly status on 28 June 2012 to become Kpando Municipal District). The district assembly is located in the western part of Volta Region and has Kpeve as its capital town.

== Background ==
The is one of the eighteen districts in the Volta Region of Ghana. They are made up of 6 municipal and 12 ordinary districts since the referendum and subsequent redemarcation of regions in December 2018.

== Boundaries ==
The district covers part of what was formerly the southern part of the old Kpando district, thus reducing the latter's size. The South Dayi district lies between latitude 3°20N and 3.5°05N. It is approximately on longitude 0°17 E. The district has a total area of 1,000 km² with the Volta Lake, the largest artificial lake in the world, covering about 20% of this.

The South Dayi District is bounded by:

- Afadjato South District, Volta Lake and Kpando Municipal District to the north;
- the Volta Lake to the west
- the Asuogyaman District in the Eastern Region to the south and
- Ho West District to the east.

== Climate and vegetation ==
The climate is tropical and is influenced largely by the southwest monsoons from across the South Atlantic Ocean which bring in the rain and the North Easterly Trade Winds blowing in the dry harmattan across the Sahara Desert. The major rainy season is between mid April and early July while the minor one is from September to November. The harmattan/dry season is between November and March.

There are two main types of vegetation. The guinea savanna woodlands covers the Dayi basin and consists of scattered trees including acacia, bamboos, and baobabs. In the region of Tsatee, Kpalime and Dzemeni are the semi-deciduous forests found on the slopes of the Akwapim-Togo-Atakora range.

== Topography ==
The Akwapim-Togo-Atakora range forms a large part of the eastern border of the district with the exception of Wegbe Kpalime which is just at the base of its eastern slope. The topography is an undulating one due to the large numbers of ridges and hills scattered throughout the district. Some of these hills are Tsatee, Akpato, Amekulotoe, Gleme and Abanyakoe.

== Population ==
The population from the 2021 census was estimated at 57,526 with a growth rate of 1.9%. The sex distribution is 50.1% female and 49.9% male. The young (0 – 14 years), make up 33.5% of the population while the 15 to 64 year old group are 60.2% and those 65 and over are 6.3%. Peki Avetile and Peki Dzake are the most populated towns in the district. Almost 50% of the total population is found in the Peki Traditional Area. The district also covers the Kpalime, Kpeve and Tongor traditional areas. The other main towns in this district include Kpeve (New Town) the capital, Peki Adzokoe, Peki Dzake, Peki-Dzogbati, Peki Sanga, Todome, Wegbe Kpalime and Dzemeni.

== Festivals ==
Festivals in South Dayi district include Gbi Dukorza celebrated by Peki and Hohoe, Kpalikpakpa zã celebrated by Kpalime and Tongor Traditional Areas, Yam festivals celebrated all over the district and the Glimetso zã (Glimetso festival) celebrated by Kpeve, Klefe, Klikor, Tsorxor and Tsibu.

== Settlements ==
In addition to Kpeve, the capital and administrative centre, South Dayi District contains the following towns:

- Tongor-Tsanakpe
- Tongor-Dzemeni
- Kpalime Duga
- Peki Adzokoe
- Peki Avetile
- Peki Blengo
- Peki Dzake
- Peki Sanga
- Peki Tsame
- Peki Wudome
- Todome
- To Kpalime
- Tongor Kaira
- Wegbe Kpalime

== Governance ==
=== District Assembly ===
South Dayi District Assembly was set up by Legislative Instrument No. 1753 of 2004. It is the highest political and administrative authority according to the Local Government Act of 1993. The jurisdiction of the local government involved the South Dayi Constituency, twelve electoral areas, two councils and two units. There are currently 21 electoral areas each of which elects a person onto the District Assembly. The District Assembly has twenty members. Seven of them are appointed. The district is headed by a District Executive who is appointed by the President of Ghana in consultation with the local District Assembly. There are an additional six members who are also appointed by government. The other thirteen members are elected representatives. They include the Member of Parliament (MP) for South Dayi who also represents the district in the national parliament and twelve additional elected members of the assembly. The MP is elected during national general elections. The other twelve members are elected through local district assembly elections. The Assembly elects a Presiding Member who holds the office for a two-year term. It also has an Executive Committee which is chaired by the District Chief Executive. There are five sub-committees mandated by section 24 (1) of the Local Government Act, 1993 (Act 462). These are the Development Planning, Finance and Administration, Justice and Security, Works and the Public Relations and Complaints sub-committees.

=== Electoral assembly members ===
The current elected members of the South Dayi assembly are as follows.

Electoral Area	Elected Representative	Comments
Avetile East	Bobi John Ransford	
Avetile West	Seyram Kafui Akude	
Dzemeni East	Thomas Avuwadah	
Dzemeni West	Lotsoo George Bada	
Kpalime Duga	Prosper Ofosu	
Kpeve New Town	David KwasiAkukumah	
Peki Adzokoe	Timothy Freeman Kotope	
Peki Agbate	Courage Otchi	
Peki Blengo	Ophilia Bediako – Nani	
Peki Dzake	Victor Amegbe	
Peki Dzogbati	Alexander Kwami Addo	
Peki Tsame	Mark Dzebu	
Peki Wudome	Wellington Elukpedzu	
Sanga	John Kwesi Ahiati	
To Kpalime	Christian Jerry Owusu	
Todome	Eric Senaya	
Tongor Kaira	Godwin Gaitu	
Tongor Tsanakpe	Blessed Vincent Dagbey	
Tsate	Daniel Ofori-Attor	
Tsiyinu	Christian Yao Dorvlo	
Wegbe Kpalime	Fred Nani	

=== District Chief Executives ===
The current District Chief Executive, Courage Kwame Kokroko was appointed by John Mahama. The past chief executives have been:

- Woyiram Boakye-Danquah - (2005 – 2009) and
- Kafui Bekui - (2009 to 2017)
- Ernest Patrick Kodzo Mallet

=== Sub districts ===
There are two sub-districts. These are the Peki Town Council and the Tongor Kaira Area Council. The Peki Town Council is urban in nature and has its headquarters at Peki Avetile. Peki has a lot of educational institutions including secondary and tertiary institutions. It also has a government hospital and good water and electricity supplies.

The Tongor Area Council consists of small communities and townships. It has a lively market at Dzemeni.

=== Traditional authority ===
The chieftaincy institution is an important part of the running of the district. The Peki Traditional Council is based at Peki-Blengo. Other important traditional authorities in the district include the Kpalime, Kpeve and Tongor.

== Health ==
The health facilities in the district include the following:

1. Adzokoe Health Centre
2. Dzemini E. P. Clinic
3. Kpalime Duga Health Centre
4. Peki Dzake Health Centre
5. Salem Maternity Home
6. Tongor Tsanekpe Health Centre
7. Tsate Community-Based Health Planning and Services (CHPS) Zone
8. Tsiyinu CHPS Zone
9. Wegbe Kpalime Health Centre

== Education ==
The Evangelical Presbyterian University College has one of its campuses, the Greenhill Campus, at Peki, where the Evangelical Presbyterian Church Seminary was located. It was established in 2008. The Peki College of Education is a long established teacher training college. Senior High Schools in the district include Kpeve Senior High School, Peki Senior High School, Peki Secondary Technical School and the Tongor Secondary Technical School at Tsanakpe.

== Transportation ==
=== Roads ===
The N2 Highway from Tema through Jasikan to Bawku and Kulungugu cuts through the district from south to north. It enters the district from Asikuma in the Asuogyaman District of the Eastern Region. It then runs through the Peki towns including Dzake, Blengo and Adzokoe. It continues through Todome and Kpeve, the capital to Have-Etoe where it intersects the R26 Regional Highway.

=== Volta Lake ===
There is a thriving market at Dzemeni on the eastern edge of the Volta Lake. The Dodi Island, a popular stop for ferry services is just west of Dzemeni.

=== Airports ===
There is no airport in the district. The nearest airport is the Ho Airport in the capital of the region. Its construction started in 2015. Due to financial reasons however, regular commercial flights to the airport have been suspended by the domestic airlines. The nearest airport with regular flights is the Accra International Airport in Accra.
