= South Dayi (Ghana parliament constituency) =

Constituency in Ghana

- constituency for the Parliament of Ghana
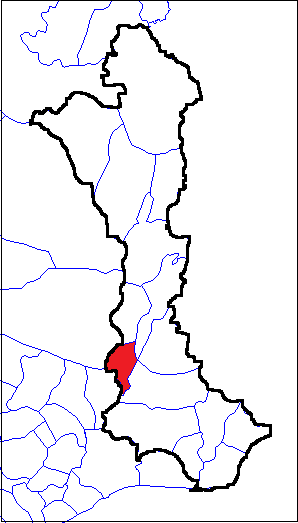
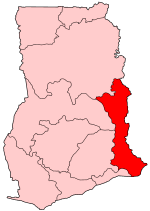
- District: South Dayi District
- Region: Volta Region of Ghana

Current constituency
- Created: 1992
- Party: National Democratic Congress
- MP: Rockson-Nelson Dafeamekpor

South Dayi is one of the constituencies represented in the Parliament of Ghana. It elects one Member of Parliament (MP) by the first past the post system of election. South Dayi is located in the South Dayi district of the Volta Region of Ghana.

== Boundaries ==
The constituency is located within the South Dayi District of the Volta Region of Ghana. It has the North Dayi constituency to the north, the Hohoe South constituency to the north-east, and the Ho West to the east and south. Its western neighbours are the Afram Plains South and the Asuogyaman constituencies, both in the Eastern Region of Ghana.

== Members of Parliament ==
First elected	Member	Party
Created 1992
1992	Alexander Ransford Ababio	National Democratic Congress
2000	Daniel Kwame Ampofo	National Democratic Congress
2008	Simon Edem Asimah	National Democratic Congress
2016	Rockson-Nelson Dafeamekpor	National Democratic Congress

== Election results ==
2024 Ghanaian general election: South Dayi
Party	Candidate	Votes	%	±%
NDC	Rockson-Nelson Este Kwami Dafeamekpor	16,031	80.04	+7.34
NPP	Godwin Kwame Dadzawa	3,853	19.24	+1.74
Liberal Party of Ghana	Rose Safo	94	0.47	—
Independent	David Awalime	51	0.25	—
Majority		12,178	60.80	+5.60
Turnout		20,168	60.01	—
Registered electors		33,609		

2020 Ghanaian general election: South Dayi:
Party	Candidate	Votes	%	±%
NDC	Rockson-Nelson Dafeamekpor	16,294	72.7	+1.26
PPP	Felix Lartey	3,933	17.5	−7.16
NPP	Ernest Mallet	2,201	9.8	+8.83
Majority		12,361	55.2	+29.46
Turnout				
Registered electors		30,441		

2016 Ghanaian general election: South Dayi
Party	Candidate	Votes	%	±%
NDC	Rockson-Nelson Dafeamekpor	12,369	71.44	+8.63
PPP	Felix Lartey	4,277	24.7	+8.76
NPP	Lovely David Davis	532	3.07	−2.45
Independent	Kenneth Kwaku Bonsu	137	0.79	—
Majority		8,092	46.74	−0.13
Turnout		17,465	59.5	−15.52
Registered electors		29,373		

2012 Ghanaian parliamentary election: South Dayi
Party	Candidate	Votes	%	±%
NDC	Simon Edem Asimah	12,309	62.81	−24.69
PPP	Felix Lartey	3,123	15.94	—
CPP	Sabon-Asare Kofi Clemence	3,082	15.73	—
NPP	Ameyibor Freeman	1,082	5.52	−3.28
Majority		9,186	46.87	−31.83
Turnout		19,984	75.02	+12.52
Registered electors		26,640		

2008 Ghanaian parliamentary election: South Dayi
Party	Candidate	Votes	%	±%
NDC	Simon Edem Asimah	13,664	87.5	+6.4
NPP	Bernard Douse	1,381	8.8	−4.9
DFP	Charles Opei-Boafo	570	3.7	—
Majority		12,283	78.7	+11.3
Turnout		15,753	62.5	+28.2
Registered electors		25,203		

2004 Ghanaian parliamentary election:South Dayi
Party	Candidate	Votes	%	±%
NDC	Daniel Kwame Ampofo	13,168	81.1	+7.0
NPP	Ernest Patrick Mallet	2,224	13.7	+7.1
Independent	Bernard Duose	853	5.3	—
Majority		10,944	67.4	+12.3
Turnout		6,491	34.3	87.1
Registered electors		18,929		

2000 Ghanaian parliamentary election:South Dayi
Party	Candidate	Votes	%	±%
NDC	Daniel Kwame Ampofo	10,392	74.1	+0.6
CPP	Kofi Sabon Asare	2,662	19.0	—
NPP	Agyepong D. Odoba	920	6.6	−4.2
People's National Convention	Yao Peter Nkrumah	49	0.3	−1.8
Majority		7,730	55.1	−1.8
Turnout		14,239	48.6	−15.5
Registered electors		29,315		

1996 Ghanaian parliamentary election:South Dayi
Party	Candidate	Votes	%	±%
NDC	Alexander Ransford Ababio	12,951	73.5	—
Independent	Winfred Manfred Asimah	2,397	13.6	—
NPP	Barney Kodzo Agbo	1,898	10.8	—
People's National Convention	Akudeka Victor Kofi	380	2.1	—
Majority		10,554	59.9	—
Turnout		17,893	64.1	+16.3
Registered electors				—

1992 Ghanaian parliamentary election:South Dayi
Party	Candidate	Votes	%	±%
NDC	Alexander Ransford Ababio	10,943		—
Majority				—
Turnout		11,062	47.8	—
Registered electors		23,131		—

== See also ==
- List of Ghana Parliament constituencies
