= List of MPs elected in the 1992 Ghanaian parliamentary election =

Colonial Era
1951 Assembly	(election)
1954 Assembly	(election)
1956 Assembly	(election)
First Republic
1957 Parliament	(election)
1965 Parliament	(election)
Second Republic
1969 Parliament	(election)
Third Republic
1979 Parliament	(election)
Fourth Republic
1st Parliament	(1992)
2nd Parliament	(1996)
3rd Parliament	(2000)
4th Parliament	(2004)
5th Parliament	(2008)
6th Parliament	(2012)
7th Parliament	(2016)
8th Parliament	(2020)
9th Parliament	(2024)

This is a list of members of Parliament (MPs) elected to the Parliament of Ghana for the First Parliament of the Fourth Republic of Ghana at the 1992 parliamentary election, held on December 29, 1992. The preceding presidential election was considered to have been conducted in a free and fair manner by international observers. The opposition parties however claimed the election was fraudulent and boycotted this parliamentary election.

The list is arranged by region and constituency. New MPs elected since the general election and changes in party allegiance are noted at the bottom of the page.

== Composition ==
Affiliation	Members
National Democratic Congress(NDC)	189
National Convention Party(NCP)	8
Independents	2
Every Ghanaian Living Everywhere (EGLE)	1
New Patriotic Party(NPP)	–
People's National Convention(PNC)	–
National Independence Party (NIP)	–
People's Heritage Party (PHP)	–
Speaker and Deputies	(3)
Total	200
Government Majority	178

The NPP, PNC, PHP and NIP all boycotted the parliamentary election and thus had no seats in parliament.

== List of MPs elected in the general election ==
The following table is a list of MPs elected on 7 December 1996, ordered by region and constituency. The previous MP and previous party column shows the MP and party holding the seat.

Table of contents:

Ashanti Region • Brong Ahafo Region • Central Region • Eastern Region • Greater Accra Region
Northern Region • Upper East Region • Upper West Region • Volta Region • Western Region
By-elections • Notes and References • See also • External links and sources

=== Ashanti Region - 33 seats ===
Constituency	Elected MP	Elected Party
Adansi Asokwa	John Kofi Gyasi	National Democratic Congress (NDC)
Afigya-Sekyere East	Pius M G Griffiths	NDC
Afigya-Sekyere West	Mrs. Beatrice Aboagye	NDC
Ahafo Ano North	Samuel Kwadwo Yamoah	NDC
Ahafo Ano South	Gabriel Barimah	NDC
Amansie West	Kofi Amankwaa Peasah	NDC
Asante Akim North	Collins Agyarko Nti	NDC
Asante Akim South	Samuel Ofosu-Mensah	NDC
Asokwa East	Mohammed Moro	NDC
Asokwa West	Osman Ahmed Boakye	NDC
Atwima/Kwanwoma	Sampson Adu Gyamfi	NDC
Atwima Mponua	Kwame Gyawu-Kyem	NDC
Atwima Nwabiagya	Yaw Bampoh	NDC
Bantama	Ofori Owusu Jibreel	NDC
Bekwai	Oduro Ofrikyi	NDC
Bosome-Freho	Johnson Frimpong	NDC
Bosomtwe	Josephine Afua Addae-Mensah	EGLE
Effiduase-Asokore	Samuel Adjei Asirifi	NDC
Ejisu/Juabeng	Mohammed Boakye-Agyemang	NDC
Ejura Sekyedumasi	Peter Boakye Ansah	NDC
Fomena	Nana Odame Kusi	NDC
Kumawu	Jargisu Ibrahim	NDC
Kwabre	Abena Takyiwa	NDC
Mampong	Dr. George Akosa	NDC
Manhyia	William Kwaku Asante	NDC
New Edubease	Mary Euginia Ghann^{a}	NDC
Nsuta/Kwamang	Samuel Brenyah	NDC
Obuasi	Peter Kenneth Owusu	NDC
Odotobri	George Adu-Mensah	NDC
Offinso North	Emmanuel Kwame Boakye	NDC
Offinso South	Kenneth Amponsah-Yiadom	NDC
Old Tafo Suame	Ibrahim Nuhu Chibsah	NDC
Subin	Joseph Alexander Tuffour Sarkodie	NDC
=== Brong Ahafo Region - 21 seats ===
Constituency	Elected MP	Elected Party
Asunafo North	David Kwasi Amankwaah	NDC
Asunafo South	Francis Adu-Poku	NDC
Asutifi North	Emmanuel Baah-Danquah	NDC
Asutifi South	Collins Dauda	NDC
Atebubu North	David Yaw Mensah	NDC
Atebubu South	Ali Amadu	NDC
Berekum	J. H. Owusu Acheampong (Majority Leader)	NDC
Dormaa East	Yaw Oppong Kyekyeku	NDC
Dormaa West	Thomas Kwame Yeboah	NDC
Jaman	Ruben Wisdom Wollie	NDC
Kintampo	Gladys Abena Nsoah	Independent
Nkoranza	Theresa Abena Nyarko-Fofie	NDC
Sene	Nana Yaw Atto	NDC
Sunyani East	Yaw Manu-Yeboah	NDC
Sunyani West	Joseph Gyamfi	NDC
Tano North	Dominic Yaw Amoako	NDC
Tano South	Samuel Amonoo Koto Asamoah^{c}	NDC
Techiman North	I.K. Adjei-Mensah	NDC
Techiman South	George Kwabena Owusu	NDC
Wenchi East	Emmanuel Obeng Mensah^{b}	NDC
Wenchi West	Johnson Asiedu Nketia	NDC
=== Central Region - 17 seats ===
Constituency	Elected MP	Elected Party
Abura/Asebu/Kwamankese	Cecilia Akua Edu	NDC
Agona East	Kojo Acquah Yankah	NDC
Agona West	John Oscar Bimpong	NDC
Ajumako/Enyan/Essiam	Dr. Joseph Kweku Enos	NDC
Asikuma/Odoben/Brakwa	Ebenezer Kobena Fosu	NDC
Assin North	Abraham Kwaku Fokuo	NDC
Assin South	Kobina Okyere	NDC
Awutu /Senya	Nkrumah James Eric	NDC
Cape Coast	John Ernest Ekuban	NDC
Effutu	R. Ebenezer Ato Ayirebi-Acquah	NDC
Gomoa East	Franis Kow Bortsie-Ansah	NDC
Gomoa West	Ama Benyiwa-Doe	NDC
Komenda/Edina/Eguafo/Abbrem	Dr. Ato Quarshie	NDC
Mfantsiman East	Mrs Comfort Owusu	NCP
Mfantsiman West	K. Abaka-Quansah	NDC
Twifo/Hemang/Lower/Denkyira	John Kweku Kumah	NDC
Upper Denkyira	Kwaku Addai-Gyambrah	NDC
=== Eastern Region - 26 seats ===
Constituency	Elected MP	Elected Party
Abetifi	Opoku Preko	NCP
Abuakwa	Owuraku Amofa	EGLE
Afram Plains North	Krosby Mensah	NDC
Afram Plains South	Kwakye Addo	NDC
Akim Oda	Nana Boaten-Abora	NDC
Akim Swedru	Paul Kofi Peprah	NDC
Akropong	Richie Agyemfra-Kumi	NDC
Akwapim South	Vida Amaadi Yeboah	NDC
Akwatia	Gilbert Kwasi Agyei	NDC
Asuogyaman	Jonathan Robert Owiredu	NDC
Atiwa	Dansoh Samuel Kwaku	NCP
Ayensuano	Amoaku Ogyadu Obuadabang Larbi	NDC
Birim North	Dr. Owusu Agyekum (Minority Leader)	NCP
Fanteakwa	Nicholas Darko Asomaning	NDC
Kade	John Darlington Brobbey	NDC
Koforidua	David Sarpong Boateng	NDC
Lower Manya Krobo	Major(Rtd) Emmanuel T. Tetteh	NDC
Lower West Akim	Akuamoah Ofosu-Boateng	NDC
Mpraeso	Gilman Appiah Kwaku	NDC
New Juabeng North	Samuel Nuamah Donkor	NCP
Nkawkaw	Abankwah George Kwabena	NCP
Okere	Dapaah Fuzzy Torbay	NDC
Suhum	Immanuel Obeng-Darko	NDC
Upper Manya Krobo	Emmanuel Ansah Nartey	NDC
Upper West Akim	Samuel Sallas Mensa	NDC
Yilo Krobo	Godwin John Quarshie	NDC
=== Greater Accra Region - 22 seats ===
Constituency	Elected MP	Elected Party
Ablekuma Central	Ismail Bawa	NDC
Ablekuma North	Adam Baako Nortey Yeboah	NDC
Ablekuma South	George Charles Quaynor-Mettle	NDC
Ada	Amos Lawerh Buertey	NDC
Ashaiman	Franklin Winfred K. Aheto	NDC
Ayawaso Central	Said Sinare	NDC
Ayawaso West-Wuogon	Kenneth Dzirasah (First Deputy Speaker)	NDC
Dade-Kotopon	Quaye MacGranaky Ben Mensa	NDC
Ayawaso East	Yahaya Seidu	NDC
Ga North	Nii Okai Parbey	NDC
Ga South	Victoria Adjetey	NDC
Klottey-Korle	Emmanuel Welbeck Nortey	NDC
Kpone-Katamanso	Joseph Teye Tetteh	NDC
Krowor	Jacob Aplerh Tawiah	NDC
Ledzokuku	Nii Adjei-Boye Sekan	NDC
Ningo-Prampram	Stanley Basil Bade Carboo	NDC
Odododiodoo	Ishmael Tetteh Aryeetey	NDC
Okaikwei North	Sheriff E Nii Oto Dodoo	NDC
Okaikwei South	Orlando Aryee	NDC
Shai-Osudoku	Michael Afedi Gizo	NDC
Tema East	Larbie Nii Adjei	NDC
Tema West	Gladys Boateng	NDC
=== Northern Region - 23 seats ===
Constituency	Elected MP	Elected Party
Bimbilla	Mohamed Ibn Chambas (First Deputy Speaker) 1993-1994	NDC
Bole	Mahama Jeduah	NDC
Bunkpurugu/Yunyoo	Joseph Yaani Labik	NDC
Chereponi	Innocent Mahamadu Yahaya	NDC
Chogu/Tishigu	Ahaji Mohammed Haroon	NDC
Damango/Daboya	Edward Aliedong Alhassan	NDC
Gukpegu/Sabongida	Alhaji. Basit Abdulai Fuseini	NDC
Gushiegu/Karaga	Issahaku Mahama	NDC
Kpandai	Likpalimor Kwajo Tawiah	NDC
Kumbungu	Alhassan Musah	NDC
Mion	Alhassan Ahmed Adams	NDC
Nalerigu	Isaac Kolibilla Batesimah	NDC
Nanton	Alhaji. Alhassan Yakubu	NDC
Saboba	Bukari Moses Mabengba	NDC
Salaga	Hamid Baba Braimah	NDC
Savelugu	Abubakar Alhassan MacNamara	NDC
Sawla/Kalba	Bayel Joseph Trumah	NDC
Tolon	Alhaji Abdullah Salifu	NDC
West Mamprusi (Walewale)	Ben Baluri Saibu	NDC
Wulensi	Amidu Seidu	NDC
Yapei/Kusawgu	Alhaji. Amadu Seidu	NDC
Yendi	Yusuf Iddrisu	NDC
Zabzugu/Tatale	Jagri John Kokpah	NDC
=== Upper East Region - 12 seats ===
Constituency	Elected MP	Elected Party
Bawku Central	Hawa Yakubu	Independent
Bawku West	Cletus Apul Avoka	NDC
Binduri	Fortunate Atubiga	NDC
Bolgatanga	Akake Patrick	NDC
Bongo	Gaaga Akayeri Azitariga	NDC
Builsa North	Sylvester Azantilow	NDC
Builsa South	Norbert Garko Awulley	NDC
Chiana / Paga	Dr. Stephen Ayidaya	NDC
Garu/Tempane	Dominic Azimbe Azumah	NDC
Nabdan	Paul Kpal Danzi	NDC
Navrongo Central	Godfrey Abulu ^{d}	NDC
Talensi	John Akologu Tia	NDC
=== Upper West Region - 8 seats ===
Constituency	Elected MP	Elected Party
Jirapa	Francis Gyafiiry Korbieh	NDC
Lambussie	Jacob Bawiine Boon	NDC
Lawra/Nandom	Ken Meyir Kunfah	NDC
Nadowli North	Alban Sumana Bagbin	NDC
Nadowli South	Emmanuel Zumakpeh	NDC
Sissala	Alhaji. Amidu Sulemana	NDC
Wa Central	Mumuni Abudu Seidu	NDC
Wa East	Issaku Saliah	NDC
=== Volta Region - 19 seats ===
Constituency	Elected MP	Elected Party
Akan	John Kwadwo Gyapong	NDC
Anlo	Cled Mawuko Kwasi Sowu	NDC
Avenor	Edward Korbly Doe Adjaho	NDC
Biakoye	Dr. Kwabena Adjei	NDC
Buem	Emil K. Bratuo	NDC
Ho Central	Kofi Attor	NDC
Ho East	Steve Senu Akorli	NDC
Ho West	Lt. Col E.K.D. Anku-Tsede (rtd.)	NDC
Hohoe North	Patience Pomary	NDC
Hohoe South	Kosi Kedem	NDC
Keta	Abodakpi Daniel Kwasi	NDC
Ketu North	Modestus Yawo Zebu Ahiable	NDC
Ketu South	Wisdom Tsidore Seyena-Susu	NDC
Krachi	Francis Kwadwo Gyefour	NDC
Nkwanta	Okpora Peter Kwadwo	NCP
North Dayi	Stephen George Obimpeh	NDC
North Tongu	Austin Gamey	NDC
South Dayi	Alexander Ransford Ababio	NDC
South Tongu	Emmanuel Oscar Ameyedowo	NDC
=== Western Region - 19 seats ===
Constituency	Elected MP	Elected Party
Ahanta West	Francis Fynn	NDC
Amenfi Central	Dr. John Frank Abu	NDC
Amenfi East	George Buadi	NDC
Amenfi West	Joseph King Amankpah	NDC
Aowin-Suaman	Dr. Arthur Sibieko Bullu	NDC
Bia	Christian Kwabena Asante	NDC
Bibiani	Kwame Darko	NDC
Effia/Kwesimintsim	Abdulai Mohammed Seidu	NDC
Ellembele	John Aitpillah	NDC
Evalue Gwira	James Ackah Cobbinah	NCP
Jomoro	Joseph Emmanuel Ackah	NDC
Juabeso	Kingsley Asoah-Apima	NDC
Mpohor-Wassa East	Mary Stella Ankomah	NCP
Prestea/Huni-Valley	Kwaku Acheampong Bonful	NDC
Sefwi-Wiawso	John Kweku Danso	NDC
Sekondi	Albert Bosomtwi-Sam	NDC
Shama	Richard Dornu Nartey	NDC
Takoradi	Tabitha Sybil Quaye	NDC
Tarkwa-Nsuaem	Mathew Kojo Kum	NDC

== By-elections ==
- ^aNew Edubiase constituency - 30 September 1993 - Theresa Joyce Boaffoe (NDC) beat Samuel Amoah (NPP) by a majority of 5,766.
- ^bWenchi East constituency - 24 January 1995 - Hayford Osei Kwadwo (NDC) won from a field of four with a majority of 3,144 to take the seat.
- ^c Tano South constituency - 7 February 1995 - Nana Koduah Kwarteng (NDC) beat Kofi Akrowiah (PCP) to second place with a majority of 3,867 from a field of four candidates.
- ^d Navrongo Central constituency - 4 July 1995 - John Setuni Achuliwor (Independent) won the seat with a majority of 196.
- Jirapa-Lambussie constituency - 26 May 1995 - Alice Teni Boon of the NDC won the seat with 6,671 votes. Her nearest opponent, Anthony Baloro of the NPP, had 1,787 votes. Thomas F. Ketting of the PNC was the final candidate with 669 votes.

== See also ==
- 1992 Ghanaian parliamentary election
- Parliament of Ghana
- Daniel Francis Annan - Speaker of the First Parliament of the Fourth Republic
