= Dansoh Samuel Kwaku =

Ghanaian politician

Hon. Dansoh Samuel Kwaku

Member of parliament for the Atiwa constituency
- In office 7 January 1993 – 7 January 1997
- President: Jerry John Rawlings
- Succeeded by: Yaw Baning-Darko

Personal details
- Party: National Convention Party
- Occupation: Politician

Dansoh Samuel Kwaku is a Ghanaian politician. He served as a member of the first parliament of the fourth republic of Ghana for Atiwa constituency in the Eastern region of Ghana from 7 January 1993 to 7 January 1997.

== Politics ==
Dansoh Samuel Kwaku was elected during the 1992 Ghanaian parliamentary election on the ticket of the National Convention Party(NCP) as member of the first parliament of the fourth republic of Ghana. During the 1996 Ghanaian general election, he lost the seat to Yaw Baning-Darko. He was elected into Parliament on the Ticket of the New Patriotic Party for the Atiwa constituency in the Eastern region in the December 1996 Ghanaian general election. He polled 19,735 votes out of the 31,731 valid votes cast representing 50.50% over his opponents Ben Ohene-Kwapong of the Convention People's Party who polled 10,480 votes representing 26.80% and Emmanuel Dakwa Adae of the People's National Congress who polled 1,516 votes representing 3.90%. He was defeated by Yaw Brempong Yeboah in his party's Parliamentary Primaries.

== Personal life ==
He is a Christian.
