= Akuamoa Ofosu-Boateng =

Ghanaian politician (born 1954)

Hon. Akuamoa Ofosu Boateng

MP for Lower West Akim
- In office 7 January 1997 – 6 January 2001
- President: Jerry Rawlings
- Succeeded by: Peter Kwaw
- In office 7 January 1993 – 7 January 1997

Personal details
- Born: 1 February 1954 (age 72)
- Party: National Democratic Congress
- Education: University of Ghana
- Occupation: Politician
- Profession: Public Servant

Akuamoa Ofosu-Boateng (born 1 February 1954) is a Ghanaian former politician and a member of the first and second parliament of the 4th republic of Ghana. He was a representative of the Lower west Akim Constituency in the Eastern Region and a member of the National Democratic Congress.

== Early life and education ==
Boateng was born on 1 February 1954 in the Eastern Region of Ghana, he studied political science at the University of Ghana where he obtained his Bachelor of Arts. He is a former public servant.

== Political career ==
Ofosu-Boateng was first elected during the 1992 Ghanaian parliamentary election on the ticket of the National Democratic Congress. He represented again Lower West Akim constituency in the 1996 Ghanaian general elections with a total of 17,830 making 42.40% of the total valid votes caste that year. He contested with Oworae Kwaku Harrison New Patriotic Party who had 16,257 representing 38.70% Christian Wilson Ofosu Kwarkye of the People's National Convention had 489 representing 1.20%, Evans Kofi Nyadua of the National Convention Party(NCP) polled 449 representing 1.10% and Akuamoa Ofosu-Boateng of the National Democratic Congress(NDC) polled 0 representing 0% in that election year. In the 2000 Ghanaian election, he lost the seat to Peter Kwaw of the New Patriotic Party who polled 18,103 votes representing 56.10% over Isaac Nti-Ababio Newton of the National Democratic Congress, Felix Atta-Owusu of the National Reformed Party, Mark Ayitey Kwablah of the Convention Peoples Party, Joseph Otoo-Essilfie of the United Ghana Movement and Hassan Al-Haji Salisu of the Peoples National Convention. These won 12,768, 623, 342, 234 and 183 votes out of the total valid votes cast respectively. These were equivalent to 39.60%, 1.90%,1.10%, 0.70% and 0.60% respectively of total valid votes.

== Personal life ==
He is a Christian.
