= Beatrice Aboagye =

Ghanaian politician

MP for Afigya-Sekyere West
- In office 7 January 1993 – 6 January 1997
- President: Jerry John Rawlings
- Preceded by: New
- Succeeded by: Albert Kan-Dapaah

Personal details
- Born: 21 February 1953 (age 73) Afigya-Sekyere West, Ashanti Region, Ghana
- Party: National Democratic Congress
- Education: Kumasi Nurses and Midwifery Training School; Ankaful Nurses Training College
- Occupation: Politician
- Profession: Nurse, Trader

Beatrice Aboagye (born 21 February 1953) is a Ghanaian politician and a member of the first Parliament of the fourth Republic representing the Afigya-Sekyere West constituency in the Ashanti region.

== Early life and education ==
Aboagye was born on 21 February 1953 at Afigya-sekyere in the Ashanti Region of Ghana. She attended the Kumasi Academy and completed with her GCE Ordinary Level certificate. She again attended the Nurses Training College, Kumasi, and obtained her Nursing Training Certificate. She continued at the Ankaful Nurses Training College and obtained her Registered Mental nurse Certificate in Nursing.

== Politics ==
Aboagye was first elected into Parliament on the ticket of the National Democratic Congress for the Afigya-sekyere Constituency in the Ashanti Region of Ghana during the 1992 Ghanaian parliamentary election. She polled 3,467 votes out of the total valid votes that were cast. She served for one term as a member of parliament and was defeated in the 1996 Ghanaian general elections by Albert Kan-Dapaah of the New Patriotic Party who polled 9,708 votes representing 58% out of the total valid votes cast against Beatrice Aboagye's 4,172 votes representing 24.50%, and Kwasi Karikari Achamfour's 123 votes which represented 0.70%.

She contested again in the 2000 Ghanaian general elections and was defeated once again by Albert Kan-Dapaah who polled 10,605 votes representing 72.2% of the total valid votes cast against Beatrice Aboagye's 3,806 votes which represented 25.9% of the total valid votes cast.

== Career ==
Aboagye is a nurse and trader by profession. She is the former member of Parliament for the Afigya-sekyere west constituency in the Ashanti Region of Ghana. on the ticket of the National Democratic Congress

She served for one term (four years) as a parliamentarian.

== Religion ==
Aboagye is a Christian.
