= Issahaku Mahama =

Ghanaian politician

Hon. Issahaku Mahama

Member of the Ghana Parliament for Gushiegu/Karaga
- In office 7 January 1993 – 6 January 1997
- President: Jerry John Rawlings
- Succeeded by: Iddrisu Huudu

Personal details
- Born: 1952 (age 73–74)
- Party: National Democratic Congress
- Education: Bawku Secondary School
- Occupation: Politician
- Profession: Farmer

Issahaku Mahama (also Alhaji Issahaku Mahama) is a Ghanaian politician, farmer and a member of the First Parliament of the Fourth Republic of Ghana. He is a former member of Parliament for the Gushiegu/Karaga constituency in the Northern Region and he represented the National Democratic Congress political party in Ghana.

== Early life and education ==
Mahama was born in the year 1952. He is an alumnus of the Bawku Secondary School. He obtained his General Certificate of Education (GCE) Ordinary Level at Bawku.

== Politics ==
Mahama was elected into parliament on the ticket of the National Democratic Congress for the Gushiegu/Karaga in the Northern Region of Ghana during the 1992 Ghanaian parliamentary Election. He was defeated by Iddrisu Huudu during the 1996 Ghanaian general election. Huudu defeated Rita Tani Iddi of the New Patriotic Party (NPP); Oliver Sigli Mahamudu of the National Convention Party(NCP) and Alhassan Musah Yahaya of the Convention People's Party (CPP).

Huudu represented again in the 2000 Ghanaian general election on the ticket of the National Democratic Congress. He was elected with 18,524 votes out of 37,264 total valid votes cast. This was equivalent to 50.9% of the total valid votes cast. This term, He was elected over Rita Tani Iddi of the New Patriotic Party, Alhasan M. Yahaya of the Convention People's Party, Moli Majeed of the People's National Convention, Hamidu S. Imoru of the National Reform Party and Tahidu Mahamudu of the United Ghana Movement. These obtained 12,686; 3,181; 1,537; 279 and 220 votes respectively out of the total valid votes cast. These were equivalent to 34.8%, 8.7%, 4.2%, 0.8 and 0.6% respectively of the total valid votes cast.

== Career ==
Mahama is a farmer by profession. He is the founder and CEO of Tiyumtaba Farms and Investments Limited. He currently works as a chairman of the Seed Producers Association of Ghana, Northern Region branch. He has had two awards as best Rice Seed Farmer and Best soybean farmer in 2000 and 2003 respectively. He was a Former member of Parliament for the Gushiegu/Karaga Constituency in the Northern Region of Ghana.

== Personal life ==
Mahama is a Muslim and belongs to the Islamic Religion.
