= Akake Patrick =

Ghanaian politician

MP for Bolgatanga
- In office 7 January 1993 – 6 January 1997
- President: Jerry John Rawlings
- Preceded by: Awulimbond Nicholas Adamboe
- Succeeded by: Simon Anyoa Abingya

Personal details
- Born: Bolgatanga, Upper East Region Gold Coast (now Ghana)
- Party: National Democratic Congress
- Occupation: Politician

Akake Patrick is a Ghanaian politician and a member of the First Parliament of the Fourth Republic who represented the Bolgatanga Constituency in the Upper East Region of Ghana. He was a member of the National Democratic Congress.

== Early life and education ==
Akake Patrick was born at Bolgatanga in the Upper East Region of Ghana.

== Politics ==
Patrick was elected into parliament on the ticket of the National Democratic Congress for the Bolgatanga Constituency in the Upper East Region of Ghana during the 1992 Ghanaian parliamentary election. He was replaced by Simon Anyoa Abingya to represent the National Democratic Congress in the 1996 Ghanaian general election. Simon Anyoa Abingya subsequently polled 26,816 votes out of the total valid votes cast representing 42.80% during the 1996 General Election over his opponents, David Apasara of the People's National Convention who polled 15,577 votes representing 24.90%, James Ben Kaba of the New Patriotic Party who polled 3,861 votes representing 6.20%, and Amiyinne Francis of the National Convention Party who polled 956 votes representing 1.50%.
