= Nkrumah James Eric =

Ghanaian politician (born 1936)

Nkrumah James Eric is a Ghanaian politician and member of the first parliament of the fourth republic of Ghana representing Awutu /Senya constituency under the membership of the National Democratic Congress (NDC)

== Early life and education ==
Nkrumah was born on 10 June 1936. He attended Kwame Nkrumah Ideological College where he pursue GCE Advance Level. He worked as a Teacher before going into parliament.

== Politics ==
He began his political career in 1992 when he became the parliamentary candidate for the National Democratic Congress (NDC) to represent his constituency in the Central Region of Ghana prior to the commencement of the 1992 Ghanaian parliamentary election.

He was sworn into the First Parliament of the Fourth Republic of Ghana on 7 January 1993 after being pronounced winner at the 1992 Ghanaian election held on 29 December 1992.

After serving his four years tenure in office, Nkrumah lost his candidacy to his fellow party comrade Babalami Abu-Sadat. He defeated Haruna Esseku of New Patriotic Party (NPP) who polled 11,722 votes representing 23.50% of the total valid votes cast, Clifford Okyne of the Convention People's Party who polled 7,234 votes representing 14.50% of the total valid votes cast, Haruna Atta-Husseyin of the who polled 493 votes representing 1.00% of the total valid votes cast and S. K. Romeo-Tetteh of National Convention Party (NCP) who polled 370 votes representing 0.70% of the total valid votes cast at the 1996 Ghanaian general elections. Babalami polled 20,347 votes which was equivalent to 40.80% of the total valid votes cast. He was thereafter elected on 7 January 1997.

== Personal life ==
Nkrumah James Eric is a Christian.
