= Emmanuel Welbeck Nortey =

Ghanaian politician (1926–2023)

Hon. Emmanuel Welbeck Nortey

Member of Parliament for the Klottey-Korley constituency
- In office 7 January 1993 – 7 January 1997
- President: Jerry John Rawlings
- Succeeded by: David Lamptey

Personal details
- Born: 8 August 1926
- Died: September 2023 (aged 97)
- Party: National Democratic Congress
- Education: Manchester College of Commerce and Manchester College of Science and Technology
- Occupation: Politician
- Profession: Industrial Consultant

Emmanuel Welbeck Nortey (8 August 1926 – September 2023) was a Ghanaian politician and an industrial consultant. He served as a member of Parliament for the Klottey-Korley Constituency in the Greater Accra Region of Ghana.

== Early life and education ==
Nortey was born on 8 August 1926. He attended Manchester College of Commerce and Manchester College of Science and Technology where he obtained respectively his Bachelor of Arts in Economics and his Diploma in Industrial Management.

== Politics ==
Emmanuel Welbeck Nortey was elected into the First Parliament of the Fourth Republic on 7 January 1993 during the 1992 Ghanaian parliamentary election held on 29 December 1992.

Nortey took seat on the ticket of the National Democratic Congress. David Lamptey took the seat in 1996 Ghanaian general election with 20,485 votes representing 26.20% of the total valid votes cast during the 1996 Ghanaian Parliamentary elections over his opponents Tei Okunor an Independent Candidate who polled 17,205 votes which also represent 22.00% of the total votes cast, Gilbert K.Quartey of the New Patriotic Party also polling 17,090 votes representing 21.90% of the total votes cast, Adolf Lutterodt of the Convention People's Party polled 4,897 votes representing 6.30% of the total votes cast, Kwame Nyarko Akuffo-Mensah an independent candidate also polled 2,173 votes which represent 2.80% of the total votes cast, Buniyamin Mohamed Buniyamin of the People's National Convention had no votes cast so as Ahmed Nii Kpakpo Oti Vanderpu an Independent Candidate.

== Career ==
Nortey was the member of the first parliament of the fourth republic of Ghana for Klottey-Korley constituency from 7 January 1993 to 7 January 1997. He was also a consultant.

== Personal life and death ==
Nortey was a Christian. He died in September 2023, at the age of 97.
