= Francis Gyafiiry Korbieh =

Ghanaian politician

Member of the Ghana Parliament for Jirapa
- In office 7 January 1993 – 6 January 2001
- Preceded by: Constituency merged
- Succeeded by: Edward Kojo Salia

Personal details
- Born: 20 December 1950 (age 75) Jirapa/Kunkyeni
- Education: Francis Xavier Minor Seminary school; St. Peter's Boys Senior High School
- Alma mater: University of Ghana; Ghana School of Law
- Occupation: Judge, Lawyer

Francis Gyafiiry Korbieh is a Ghanaian politician who served as a member of the 1st and 2nd parliaments of the 4th republic of Ghana representing Jirapa Constituency under the membership of the National Democratic Congress (NDC). He served as a member of parliament for the Jirapa Constituency from 7 January 1993 to 6 January 2001.

== Early life and education ==
Korbieh was born 20 December 1950 in Jirapa/Kunkyeni in the Upper West region of Ghana. He had his secondary education at Francis Xavier Minor Seminary school in Wa, and St. Peter's Secondary School in Kwahu. He obtained his Bachelor of Science degree in Law from University of Ghana, Legon. He then decided to further his studies at Ghana School of Law to become a Barrister at Law. He worked as a lawyer for years and later became a judge.

== Political career ==
Francis was elected into the first parliament of the fourth republic of Ghana on 29 December 1992, after he was pronounced winner at the 1992 Ghanaian parliamentary election. He assumed office as a member of parliament for the Jirapa Constituency on 7 January 1993.

He was thereafter re-elected to represent his constituency again at the 2nd parliament of the 4th republic after he emerged winner at the 1996 Ghanaian General Elections. He defeated Kumbal Columbus Tikure of the New Patriotic Party and Michael Zu of the People's National Convention. He obtained 59.60% of the total valid votes which is equivalent to 17,555 votes while his oppositions obtained 5.40% which is equivalent to 1,582 votes and 4.60% which is equivalent to 1,342 votes. His tenure in office as a member of parliament ended on 6 January 2001.

== Personal life ==
He is a Christian, and a member of the Catholic Church of Ghana.
