= Johnson Frimpong =

Ghanaian politician

Member of Parliament
- In office 7 January 1993 – 6 January 1997
- President: Jerry Rawlings
- Parliamentary group: National Democratic Congress
- Constituency: Bosome-Freho constituency

Personal details
- Born: 14 April 1957 (age 69)
- Education: Atebubu College of Education

Johnson Frimpong is a Ghanaian politician and member of the first parliament of the fourth republic of Ghana. He is also a member of the National Democratic Congress (NDC) representing Bosome-Freho constituency.

== Early life and education ==
Johnson was born on 14 April 1957. He attended Atebubu Training College now Atebubu College of Education in the Bono East region of Ghana where he obtained his Teachers' Training Certificate. After graduation, he began his teaching career and worked as a teacher before going into parliament.

== Politics ==
Johnson began his political career in 1992 when he became the parliamentary candidate for the National Democratic Congress (NDC) to represent Bosome-Freho constituency prior to the commencement of the 1992 Ghanaian parliamentary election. He was elected into the first parliament of the fourth republic of Ghana during the 1992 Ghanaian parliamentary election, after which he assumed office on 7 January 1993. He lost his seat to Gabriel Yaw Amoah of the New Patriotic Party in the 1996 Ghanaian general election.

== Personal life ==
He is a Christian and married.
