= Quaye MacGranaky Ben Mensa =

Ghanaian engineer and politician

Hon. Quaye MacGranaky Ben Mensa

Member of Parliament for Dade-Kotopon constituency
- In office 7 January 1993 – 6 January 1997
- President: Jerry John Rawlings
- Succeeded by: Sylvester A. Mensah

Personal details
- Born: 1939 (age 86–87)
- Party: National Democratic Congress
- Occupation: Politician
- Profession: Engineer

Quaye MacGranaky Ben Mensa is a Ghanaian engineer and politician. He served as a member of the First Parliament of the Fourth Republic of Ghana for Dade-Kotopon constituency in the Greater Accra region of Ghana.

== Early life and education ==
Mensa was born in 1939, He attended Technishe Hoschule where he obtained a Doctor of Philosophy in Engineering.

== Career ==
Mensa was the former member of the First Parliament of the Fourth Republic of Ghana from 7 January 1993 to 6 January 1997. He is an Engineer.

== Politics ==
Quaye MacGranaky Ben Mensa was first elected into parliament during the 1992 Ghanaian parliamentary election on the ticket of the National Democratic Congress as member of the First Parliament of the Fourth Republic of Ghana.

During the 1996 Ghanaian general election, Sylvester A. Mensah took the seat for the National Democratic Congress with 36,959 votes representing 41.50% of the share defeating Cecilia Eguakun of New Patriotic Party who had 30,484 votes, Mensa Mac Granaky Quaye an Independent at this time who had 3,919 votes which represented 4.40% of the total valid votes cast, Christian Randolph Lartey of the People's National Convention who had 1,703 votes which represented 1.90% of the total votes cast, Ivor Kobina Greenstreet of the Convention People's Party and Abdul Rashid Boi-Nai an Independent had no votes.

== Personal life ==
He is a Christian.
