= Darko Nicholas Asomaning =

Ghanaian politician

Hon. Darko Nicholas Asomaning

Member of parliament for Fanteakwa constituency
- In office 7 January 1993 – 7 January 1997
- President: Jerry John Rawlings
- Succeeded by: Samuel Ofosu Ampofo

Personal details
- Born: June 2, 1939 (age 87)
- Party: National Democratic Congress
- Education: Ealing Technical College
- Occupation: Politician
- Profession: Economist and Farmer

Darko Nicholas Asomaning (born 2 June 1939) is a Ghanaian politician, economist, and farmer. He served as member of the first parliament of the fourth republic of Ghana for the Fanteakwa constituency in the Eastern region of Ghana.

== Early life and education ==
Asomaning was born on 2 June 1939 in the Eastern Region of Ghana. He attended Ealing Technical College where he earned his Bachelor of Science in economics.

== Politics ==
Asomaning was elected during the 1992 Ghanaian parliamentary election as member of the first parliament of the fourth republic of Ghana on the ticket of the National Democratic Congress.

He lost the seat in 1996 Ghanaian general election to Samuel Ofosu-Ampofo of the National Democratic Congress. He won the seat with 21,284 votes which represented 46.90% of the share by defeating Robert Addo-Fening of the New Patriotic Party (NPP) who obtained 14,241 votes which represented 31.40% of the share, Reuben Gordon Ofosu of the National Democratic Congress who obtained 59 votes which represented 0.10%, Akrasi Joseph Romulus of the People's National Convention (PNC) and Beatrice Ayim Yeboah of the Every Ghanaian Living Everywhere (EGLE) who obtained no vote.

== Career ==
A Christian, Asomaning was M.P. for Fanteakwa from 7 January 1993 to 7 January 1997.
