= Joseph Teye Tetteh =

Ghanaian politician (born 1945)

Hon. Joseph Teye Tetteh

Member of parliament for Kpone-Katamanso constituency
- In office 7 January 1993 – 7 January 1997
- President: Jerry John Rawlings
- Succeeded by: Afieye Ashong

Personal details
- Born: 15 December 1945 (age 80)
- Party: National Democratic Congress
- Education: Tema Technical Institute and Cuttbus (GDR)
- Occupation: Politician
- Profession: Educator

Joseph Teye Tetteh is a Ghanaian politician and also a teacher. He served as a member of parliament for the Kpone-Katamanso constituency in the Greater Accra region of Ghana.

== Early life and education ==
Tetteh was born on 15 December 1945. He attended Tema Technical Institute where he obtained a certificate in City & Guild in tailoring, He also went to Cuttbus (GDR) where he obtained a Diploma in Social Science.

== Politics ==
Tetteh was elected during the 1992 Ghanaian parliamentary election as the first member of the fourth republic of Ghana on the ticket of the National Democratic Congress.

In 1996, Afieye Ashong of National Democratic Congress took the seat with 7,901 votes cast which representing 59.50% of the share by defeating George T. Noye of the New Patriotic Party who obtained 2,609 votes which represent 19.60% of the share; Emmanuel Kweku Sagoe of National Convention Party who obtained 562 votes which represent 4.20% of the share and Theophilus Tei Okunor of People's National Convention who obtained 138 votes which represent 1.00% of the share.

Ashong was again elected as a member of parliament for the Kpone Katamanso constituency in the 3rd parliament of the 4th Republic of Ghana in the 2000 Ghanaian general elections.

In March 2017, Tetteh was named as one of the ten deputy regional ministers who would form part of his government by then President Nana Akufo-Addo. In the same month, both the Parliament and the Appointment Committee of Ghana vetted Tetteh and he was later approved and his name was forwarded to the Speaker of Parliament for further approval.

== Career ==
Joseph Teye Tetteh was the former member of the First Parliament of the Fourth Republic of Ghana for Kpone-Katamanso from 7 January 1993 to 6 January 1997. He is a teacher.

== Personal life ==
He is a Christian
