= Emmanuel T. Tetteh =

Ghanaian politician (born 1938)

Hon. Emmanuel T. Tetteh

Member of Parliament for Lower Manya Krobo constituency
- In office 7 January 1993 – 7 January 1997
- President: Jerry John Rawlings
- Succeeded by: Michael Teye Nyaunu

Personal details
- Born: October 10, 1938 (age 87)
- Party: National Democratic Congress
- Education: St. Acquinas Secondary School
- Occupation: Politician
- Profession: Industrialist

Emmanuel T. Tetteh (born 10 October 1938) is a Ghanaian politician and an Industrialist. He served for Lower Manya Krobo constituency as member of the first parliament of the fourth republic of Ghana in the Eastern Region of Ghana.

== Early life and education ==
Tetteh was born on October 10, 1938, in the Eastern Region of Ghana. He attended St. Acquinas Secondary School where he obtained his General Certificate of Education (GCE) Ordinary Level Certificate.

== Politics ==
Tetteh was elected during the 1992 Ghanaian parliamentary election on the ticket of the National Democratic Congress as member of the first parliament of the fourth republic of Ghana.

He lost the seat in 1996 Ghanaian general election to Michael Teye Nyaunu of the National Democratic Congress who won with 24,763 votes out of the 30,963 valid votes cast representing 59.50% over his opponents Kodjiku Lawrence Kpabitey a New Patriotic Party (NPP) member, Robert Kwesi Nartey a People's National Convention (PNC) member, Samuel Terlabie a Convention People's Party (CPP) member and John Tetteh Akuerter an Every Ghanaian Living Everywhere (EGLE) member who polled 5,718 votes which represented 13.70% of the share, 482 votes which represented 1.20% of the share, 0 vote and 0 vote respectively.

== Career ==
Tetteh was M.P. from 7 January 1993 to 7 January 1997.

== Personal life ==
Tetteh is a Christian.
