= Gilman Appiah Kwaku =

Ghanaian politician

Hon. Gilman Appiah Kwaku

Member of parliament for Mpraeso constituency
- In office 7 January 1993 – 7 January 1997
- President: Jerry John Rawlings
- Succeeded by: Francis Osafo Mensah

Personal details
- Born: 7 July 1939 (age 87)
- Party: National Democratic Congress
- Education: Wesley College
- Occupation: Politician
- Profession: Educator

Gilman Appiah Kwaku (born 7 July 1939) is a Ghanaian politician and a teacher. He served as member of the first parliament of the fourth republic of Ghana for Mpraeso constituency in the Eastern Region of Ghana.

== Early life and education ==
Gilman Appiah Kwaku was born on July 7, 1939. He attended Wesley College and obtained his Geography Specialist Certificate in Geography.

== Politics ==
Kwaku was elected during the 1992 Ghanaian parliamentary election as member of the first parliament of the fourth republic of Ghana on the ticket of the National Democratic Congress. He lost the seat in 1996 Ghanaian general election to Francis Osafo Mensah of the New Patriotic Party who won with 14,906 votes making 41% of the total votes cast that year. He defeated Mike Kwabena Sakyi-Akyeampo of the National Democratic Congress who polled 11,574 votes representing 32.60% of the share, Joseph Mensah of the National Convention Party(NCP) who polled 702 votes representing 2.00% of the share and Samuel Osafo Asante of the Convention People's Party (CPP) who polled 542 votes representing 1.50% of the share.

== Career ==
Kwaku is a former member of parliament of Mpraeso constituency from 7 January 1993 to 7 January 1997.

== Personal life ==
He is a Christian.
