= Christian Kwabena Asante =

Ghanaian politician

Member of parliament for Bia constituency
- In office 7 January 1993 – 6 January 1997
- President: Jerry John Rawlings

Personal details
- Born: 23 October 1940 (age 85)
- Occupation: Teacher

Christian Kwabena Asante is a Ghanaian politician and a member of the first parliament of the fourth republic of Ghana representing Bia Constituency under the membership of the National Democratic Congress.

== Early life and education ==
Christian Kwabena Asante was born on 23 October 1940. He studied at Government Training College where he obtained his GCE Ordinary Level. He worked as a teacher before going to parliament.

== Politics ==
Asante began his political career in 1992 when he became the parliamentary candidate for the National Democratic Congress (NDC) to represent Asokwa East constituency prior to the commencement of the 1992 Ghanaian parliamentary election. He was elected into the first parliament of the fourth republic of Ghana on 7 January 1993 after being pronounced winner at the 1992 Ghanaian election held on 29 December 1992. Asante was re-elected into the 2nd parliament of the 4th republic of Ghana during the 1996 Ghanaian general election on the ticket of the National Democratic Congress. He defeated Benjamin Armah of the New Patriotic Party by obtaining 51.60% of the total valid votes which was equivalent to 37,250 votes.

He was succeeded by Michael Coffie Boampong of NDC.
