= Quaynor =

Ghanaian surname

Quaynor is a surname of Ghanaian origin.

Notable people with the surname include:

- Isaac Quaynor (born 2000), Australian rules footballer of Ghanaian descent
- Moustapha Quaynor (born 1995), Ghanaian association footballer
- Nii Quaynor (born 1949), Ghanaian scientist and engineer
- Nii Addo Quaynor (born 1982), Ghanaian rapper known professionally as Tinny

== See also ==
- George Charles Quaynor-Mettle (born 1995), Ghanaian politician
- Quay (disambiguation), including a list of people with the given name and surname
