= Lamptey =

Lamptey is a surname of Ghanaian origin. The name is given among the Ga tribe in the Greater Accra region of Ghana.

It may refer to:

- C. O. Lamptey, Ghanaian police officer
- Cynthia Lamptey, Ghanaian lawyer
- David Lamptey, Ghanaian businessman and politician
- George Lamptey, Ghanaian jurist and justice of the Supreme Court
- Jonathan Kwesi Lamptey, Ghanaian politician
- Joseph Lamptey, Ghanaian football referee
- Lauretta Lamptey, Ghanaian lawyer
- Nii Lamptey (b. 1974), Ghanaian footballer
- Odartey Lamptey, Ghanaian soldier and activist
- Peter Lamptey (1946–2025), Ghanaian footballer
- Richmond Lamptey (b. 1997), Ghanaian footballer
- Sampson Lamptey, Ghanaian footballer
- Tariq Lamptey (b. 2000), Ghanaian footballer
- Emmanuel Obetsebi-Lamptey (1902–1963), Ghanaian politician
- Jacob Otanka Obetsebi-Lamptey (1946–2016), Ghanaian politician
