= Abankwah George Kwabena =

Ghanaian politician

Member of Parliament for Nkawkaw Constituency
- In office July 1, 1993 – July 1, 1997
- President: Jerry John Rawlings

Personal details
- Born: January 7, 1948 (age 78)
- Occupation: Lawyer

Abankwah George Kwabena (born 7 July 1948) is a Ghanaian politician and a member of the first parliament of the 4th Republic of Ghana from 1993 to 1997. He represented the Nkawkaw constituency in the Eastern Region of Ghana.

== Early life and education ==
Abankwah was born on 7 July 1948. He is an alumnus of University of Ghana where he studied Law and had Bachelor of Laws degree. He worked as an accountant before going into the parliament.

== Politics ==
Mr. Kwabena served as member of parliament representing Nkawkaw constituency in the Eastern region of Ghana under the membership of the National Convention Party. He was elected into office in the December 1992 Ghanaian General Elections and assumed office on 7 January 1993 and ended his tenure on 7 January 1997 due to the dissolution of the Parliament. the party merged with People's convention party to form Convention People's Party in 1996. Kwabena lost the party primaries to Ebenezer Kese Antwi who contested in the 1996 parliamentary elections but lost the poll to William Bimpong Asante of the National Democratic congress.

== Personal life ==
Mr. Kwabena is a Christian.
