= John Oscar Bimpong =

Ghanaian politician (born 1946)

Member of Parliament for Agona West Constituency
- In office 7 January 1993 – 6 January 1997
- President: Jerry John Rawlings
- Parliamentary group: National Democratic Congress

Personal details
- Born: 23 April 1946 (age 80)
- Education: University of Cape Coast
- Occupation: Teacher

John Oscar Bimpong is a Ghanaian politician and member of the first parliament of the fourth republic of Ghana representing the Agona West constituency under the membership of the National Democratic Congress (NDC).

== Early life and education ==
John Oscar Bimpong was born on 23 April 1946. He attended the University of Cape Coast (UCC) where he obtained his Bachelor of Arts in Education. He worked as a Teacher before going into parliament.

== Politics ==
He began his political career in 1992 when he became the parliamentary candidate for the National Democratic Congress (NDC) to represent his constituency in the Central Region of Ghana prior to the commencement of the 1992 Ghanaian parliamentary election.

He was sworn into the First Parliament of the Fourth Republic of Ghana on 7 January 1993 after being a pronounced winner at the 1992 Ghanaian election held on 29 December 1992.

After serving his four years tenure in office, John lost his candidacy to his fellow party comrade Samuel Oppong. He defeated Paul Kofi Tawiah of the National Patriotic Party (NPP) who polled 14,831 votes which was equivalent to 29.90% of the total valid votes cast, John F. Edwin, Jnr of the Convention People's Party (CPP) who polled 3,362 votes which was equivalent to 6.80% of the total valid votes cast, Isaac Ebo Bartels of the National Convention Party (NCP) who polled 2,091 votes which was equivalent to 4.20% of the total valid votes cast, Baba Rockson of the People's National Convention (PNC) who polled 552 votes which was equivalent to 1.10% of the total valid votes cast and Mathew Caurie of the Convention People's Party (CPP) who polled 0 votes which was equivalent to 0.00% of the total valid votes cast at the 1996 Ghanaian general elections. Samuel polled 19,473 votes which was equivalent to 39.30% of the total valid votes cast. He was thereafter elected on 7 January 1997.
