= Peter Kwadwo Okpora =

Ghanaian politician

Hon. Peter Kwadwo Okpora

Member of Parliament for Nkwanta constituency
- In office 7 January 1993 – 7 January 1997
- President: Jerry John Rawlings
- Succeeded by: Gershon Kofi Gbediame

Personal details
- Born: 1954 (age 71–72)
- Party: National Convention Party
- Education: University of Cape Coast
- Occupation: Politician
- Profession: Educator

Peter Kwadwo Okpora (born 1954) is a Ghanaian politician and an Educator. He served as a member of parliament for the Nkwanta constituency in the Volta Region of Ghana.

== Early life and education ==
Peter Kwadwo Okpora was born in 1954. He attended the University of Cape Coast where he obtained a Bachelor of Arts in education.

== Career ==
Okpora is a former member of the first parliament of the fourth republic, he served from 7 January 1993 to 7 January 1997, He is a Teacher.

== Politics ==
Peter Kwadwo Okpora was first elected in the 1992 Ghanaian parliamentary election on the ticket of the National Convention Party(NCP) as first member of parliament for the fourth republic of Ghana. He lost the seat to Gershon Kofi Gbediame who won on the ticket of the National Democratic Congress with 29,344 votes which represented 53.70% of the share. he defeated Martin Bacheri Mawah an Independent who obtained 6,970 votes which represented 12.70% of the share; Abdulah Fuhlanba of the New Patriotic Party (NPP) who obtained 3,992 votes which represented 7.30% of the share; Peter Kwadwo Okpora of the Convention People's Party (CPP) who obtained 3,724 votes which represented 6.80% of the share and Gabriel Labein Bayi of the People's National Convention(PNC) who obtained 1,329 votes which represented 2.40% of the share.

== Personal life ==
He is a Christian.
