= Nii Okai Parbey =

Ghanaian politician (born 1953)

Hon. Nii Okai Parbey

Member of Parliament for Ga North constituency
- In office 7 January 1993 – 7 January 1997
- President: Jerry John Rawlings
- Succeeded by: Sampson Ottu Darkoh

Personal details
- Born: 10 February 1953 (age 73)
- Party: National Democratic Congress
- Education: University of Michigan
- Occupation: Politician
- Profession: Architect

Nii Okai Parbey is a Ghanaian architect and politician. He served as a member of parliament for the Ga North constituency in Greater Accra region of Ghana.

== Early life and education ==
Nii Okai Parbey was born on 10 February 1953. He attended the University of Michigan where he obtained a Bachelor of Science in architecture.

== Career ==
Parbey is an Architect and member of the first parliament of the fourth republic, he served only one term for the Ga North constituency from 7 January 1993 to 7 January 1997.

== Politics ==
Parbey was elected into parliament during the 1992 Ghanaian parliamentary election as the member of the first parliament of the fourth republic of Ghana for Ga North constituency on the ticket of the National Democratic Congress. He lost the seat in 1996 Ghanaian general election to Sampson Ottu Darkoh of the New patriotic Party who won the seat with 30,555 votes representing 36.00% of the share. He defeated Amadu Bukari Sorgho of the National Democratic Congress and Ibrahim Hollison of the National Independence Party, Francis Attakpah of the PNC, Thomas N. Ward-Brew of the DPP. He claimed 36.00% of the total votes cast while his opposition claimed 34.00% ,4.50%, 2.00% and 1.90% respectively.

== Personal life ==
He is a Christian.
