= Orlando Aryee =

Ghanaian politician

Hon. Orlando Aryee

Member of parliament for Okaikwei South constituency
- In office 7 January 1993 – 7 January 1997
- President: Jerry John Rawlings
- Succeeded by: Nana Akomea

Personal details
- Born: 8 June 1954 (age 72)
- Party: National Democratic Congress
- Education: Ebenezer Secondary School
- Occupation: Politician
- Profession: Stationery Supplier

Orlando Aryee is a Ghanaian politician and a Stationery Supplier. He served as a member of the first parliament of the fourth republic of Ghana for the Okaikwei South constituency in the Greater Accra region of Ghana.

== Early life and education ==
Orlando Aryee was born on 8 June 1954. he attended Ebenezer Secondary School where he obtained a GCE Ordinary Level.

== Career ==
Orlando Aryee was a former member of the first parliament of the fourth republic of Ghana for Okaikwei South constituency and a Stationery Supplier.

== Politics ==
Orlando Aryee was first elected during the 1992 Ghanaian parliamentary election as member of the first parliament of the fourth republic of Ghana on the ticket of the National Democratic Congress.

He lost the seat in 1996 Ghanaian general election to Nana Akomea of New Patriotic Party who defeated Agbemor Yeboah Ernest of National Democratic Congress, Ohene Georgina Ama Adumea of Convention People's Party (CPP) Kwaku Owiredu of People's National Congress (PNC) and Corley Clottey Benjamin of Nationalist Congress Party (NCP) to win the Okaikwei south constituency with 35,284 votes representing 44.70% of the share.

His opponents obtained respectively 22,928 votes representing 29.00% of the share; 1,723 votes representing 2.20% of the share; 1,474 votes representing 1.90% of the share and 1,066 votes representing 1.30% of the share.

== Personal life ==
He is a Christian.
