= Basil Bade Stanley Carboo =

Ghanaian politician

Hon. Basil Bade Stanley Carboo

Member of Parliament for Ningo-Prampram constituency
- In office 7 January 1993 – 7 January 1997
- President: Jerry John Rawlings
- Succeeded by: Enoch Teye Mensah
- Constituency: Ningo-Prampram

Personal details
- Born: December 3, 1937
- Died: January 22, 2026 (aged 88)
- Education: London School of Printing
- Occupation: Politician
- Profession: Printer

Basil Bade Stanley Carboo is a Ghanaian politician and also a printer. He was a member of parliament for the Ningo-Prampram constituency in Greater Accra Region of Ghana.

== Early life and education ==
Carboo was born on 3 December 1937 in Greater Accra Region of Ghana. He schooled in London at the London School of Printing (Currently London College of Communication), there he obtained a Diploma.

== Career ==
Carboo was a printer before entering the parliament in 1993 as a member of the first parliament of the fourth republic of Ghana.

== Politics ==
Carboo was a member of the first parliament of the fourth republic of Ghana. He took seat during the 1992 Ghanaian parliamentary election on the ticket of the National Democratic Congress. He was on seat from 7 January 1993 to 7 January 1997.

He did only one term for the Ningo-prampram constituency under Jerry John Rawlings Government. He was succeeded by Enoch Teye Mensah of the National Democratic Congress who won the seat during the 1996 Ghanaian general election with 15,677 votes representing 56.10% of the share defeating his opponents; Desmond Nene Quaynor who polled 1,569 which represent 5.60% of the total votes cast and Gwendolyn Sara Addo an Independent candidate who also polled 1,537 representing 5.50% under the membership of the National Democratic Congress. He hold the seat from January 1996 to January 2017.

== Personal life ==
Carboo is a Christian.
