= John Kweku Kumah =

Ghanaian politician (born 1938)

- Succeeded by: Constituency divided

Mp for Twifo / Hemang / Lower / Denkyira Constituency
- In office 7 January 1993 – 6 January 2001
- President: Jerry John Rawlings

Personal details
- Born: 30 March 1938 (age 88)
- Occupation: teacher

John Kweku Kumah (born 30 March 1938) is a Ghanaian politician and a member of the 1st and 2nd parliament of the 4th republic of Ghana representing Twifo / Hemang / Lower / Denkyira Constituency under the membership of the National Democratic Congress

== Early life ==
John was born in the Central Region of Ghana. He obtained his Bachelor of Arts degree from University of Ghana, Legon.

He then proceeded to Central Region to further his studies where he obtained his Post Graduate Certificate and Master of Arts degree from University of Cape Coast. He worked as a teacher before going into politics.

== Political career ==
John was sworn into the First Parliament of the Fourth Republic of Ghana on 7 January 1993 after he was pronounced winner at the 1992 Ghanaian parliamentary election held on 29 December 1992. He was sworn into the Second Parliament of the Fourth Republic on 7 January 1997 after emerging winner at the 1996 Ghanaian General Elections.

He was declared winner at the 1996 elections after defeating his party mate Kwaku Nyamaa-Akyeampong by obtaining 51.70% of the total valid votes cast which is equivalent to 25,777 votes while Kwaku obtained 34.80% which is equivalent to 17,358 votes.

In 2004 the Twifo / Hemang / Lower / Denkyira Constituency was divided into Hemang-Lower-Denkyira Constituency and Twifo-Atti Morkwaa Constituency. He was succeeded by Benjamin Bimpong Donkor and Elizabeth Amoah Tetteh.

== Personal life ==
He is a Christian
