= George Adu-Mensah =

Ghanaian politician

George Adu Mensah

MP for Odotobri
- In office 7 January 1993 – 6 January 1997
- President: Jerry John Rawlings
- Preceded by: New
- Succeeded by: Samuel Nkrumah Gyimah

Personal details
- Born: 20 December 1957 (age 68) Odotobri, Ashanti Region Gold Coast (now Ghana)
- Party: National Democratic Congress
- Education: University of Ghana
- Occupation: Politician
- Profession: Agriculturalist

George Adu-Mensah born (20 December 1957) is a Ghanaian politician and a member of the first Parliament of the fourth Republic representing the Odotobri constituency in the Ashanti region.

== Early life and education ==
Adu-Mensah was born on 20 December 1957 at Odotobri in the Ashanti Region of Ghana. He graduated at the University of Ghana and obtained his Bachelor of Science degree after he studied agriculture.

== Politics ==
Adu-Mensah was first elected into parliament on the ticket of the National Democratic Congress during the December 1992 Ghanaian parliamentary election for the Odotobri Constituency in the Ashanti Region of Ghana. He was defeated by Samuel Nkrumah Gyimah of the New Patriotic Party during the 1996 Ghanaian general elections who polled 70% out of the 100% valid votes cast whilst Adu-Mensah polled 30% out of the 100% valid votes cast. He served for one term as a member of parliament. Following his defeat to Gyimah in the 1996 general election, he was appointed the District Chief Executive of the Adansi West District (now a part of the Obuasi Municipal District). He served in this capacity from 1997 to 2001 when the New Patriotic Party took office as the political party in power.

== Career ==
Adu-Mensah is an Agriculturalist by profession and a former Deputy Ashanti Regional Minister in-charge of Agriculture. He also is the former member for parliament for the Odotobri constituency in the Ashanti Region. He is a Trader as well.

== Personal life ==
Adu-Mensah is a Christian.
