= Nana Boaten-Abora =

Ghanaian politician

Nana Boateng-Abora

Member of Parliament for Akyem Oda
- President: John Kufour
- Parliamentary group: National Democratic Congress

Personal details
- Born: 18 October 1954 (age 71)
- Education: Kwame Nkrumah University of Science and Technology
- Occupation: University Lecturer

Nana Boaten-Abora is a Ghanaian politician and member of the first parliament of the fourth republic of Ghana representing Akyem Oda constituency under the membership of the National Democratic Congress (NDC)

== Early life and education ==
Boaten-Abora was born on 18 October 1954. He attended the Kwame Nkrumah University of Science and Technology (KNUST) where he obtained his Bachelor of Arts in Industrial Arts. He worked as a University Lecturer before going into parliament.

== Personal life ==
Boaten-Abora is a B'ahai.

== Politics ==
He began his political career in 1992 when he became the parliamentary candidate for the National Democratic Congress (NDC) to represent his constituency in the Eastern Region of Ghana prior to the commencement of the 1992 Ghanaian parliamentary election.

He was sworn into the First Parliament of the Fourth Republic of Ghana on 7 January 1993 after being pronounced the winner at the 1992 Ghanaian election held on 29 December 1992.

After serving his four-year tenure in office, Boaten-Abora lost his seat to his counterpart in the New Patriotic Party (NPP), Yaw Osafo Maafo. He defeated of the Boaten-Abora National Democratic Congress (NDC) who polled 16,984 votes representing 31.10% of the total valid votes cast, Yaw Frempong Awuku of the People's National Convention (PNC) who polled 750 votes representing 1.40% of the total valid votes cast, Willie De-Graft Sakyi of the National Convention Party (NCP) who polled 375 votes representing 0.70% of the total valid votes cast and Samuel Daves-Adjepong of the Convention People's Party (CPP) who polled 0 votes representing 0.00% of the total valid votes cast at the 1996 Ghanaian general elections. Osafo polled 26,685 votes which was equivalent to 48.80% of the total valid votes cast. He was thereafter elected on 7 January 1997.

== Death ==
He died on September 15, 1999.
