= Nana Yaw Otto =

Ghanaian politician

Member of Parliament for Sene Constituency
- In office 7 January 1993 – 6 January 2001
- President: Jerry John Rawlings

Personal details
- Education: University of Mines and Technology
- Occupation: Engineer

Nana Yaw Otto is a Ghanaian politician and a member of the 2nd parliament of the 4th republic of Ghana representing Sene Constituency. He is a member of the National Democratic Congress.

== Early life ==
Nana was born on 22 November 1962 in the Brong Ahafo Region of Ghana. He obtained his Diploma degree in Automative and Industrial Engineering from University of Mines and Technology, Tarkwa. He worked as an engineer before going into politics.

== Political career ==
Nana was elected into the first parliament of the fourth republic of Ghana on 7 January 1993 after he was pronounced winner at the 1992 Ghanaian parliamentary election held on 29 December 1992.

He was therefore re-elected into the second parliament of the fourth republic of Ghana on 7 January 1997. He was declared winner at the 1996 Ghanaian General Elections having defeated K. S. Odi-Asempa Daanyansah of the Convention People's Party. He obtained 61.30% of the total votes cast whilst his opponent obtained 15.50%.
