= Sheriff E Nii Oto Dodoo =

Ghanaian politician

Hon. Sheriff E Nii Oto Dodoo

Member of parliament for Okaikwei North constituency
- In office 7 January 1993 – 7 January 1997
- President: Jerry John Rawlings
- Succeeded by: Joseph Darko Mensah

Personal details
- Born: 19 July 1954 (age 72)
- Party: National Democratic Congress
- Education: Soviet Institute of (Social Studies) Intelligence
- Occupation: Politician
- Profession: Intelligence and marketer

Sheriff E Nii Oto Dodoo is a Ghanaian politician and an Intelligence, Marketer. He served as a member of the first parliament of the fourth republic of Ghana for Okaikwei North constituency in Greater Accra region of Ghana.

== Early life and education ==
Sheriff E Nii Oto Dodoo was born on 19 July 1954. He attended Soviet Institute of (Social Studies) Intelligence where he obtained a GCE Ordinary Level and went after to Institute of International Relations where he obtained a Certificate in Marketing and Intelligence.

== Career ==
Dodoo was a former member of the first parliament of the fourth republic of Ghana, he served for one term from 7 January 1993 to 7 January 1997, he is an Intelligence Marketer. He is also the Municipal Chief Executive for the Ga South Assembly.

== Politics ==
Sheriff E Nii Oto Dodoo was first elected during the 1992 Ghanaian parliamentary election as a member of the first parliament of the fourth republic of Ghana on the ticket of the National Democratic Congress.

He lost the seat in 1996 Ghanaian general election to Joseph Darko Mensah of the New Patriotic Party who defeated Philip Kwame Agbeyome of the National Democratic Congress; Kwaku Oteng Anane of Convention People's Party; Abdullah Nii Armah of People's National Convention and Mohammed Saleh Sinare of the National Convention Party. He won the seat with 34,641 votes representing 35.20% of the share.

In 2010, Sheriff E Nii Oto Dodoo who had inaugurated the Weija Lake Protection Association (WLPA) pledged the assembly's commitment to effectively monitor the lake and save for mismanaged.

In 2011, he donated eight 4X4 Dongfeng Nissan pick-ups to boost the work and services of the assembly.

== Personal life ==
He is a Muslim.
