= Theresa Nyarko-Fofie =

Ghanaian politician

Theresa Abena Nyarko-Fofie

Member of Parliament for Nkoranza constituency
- In office 7 January 1993 – 6 January 2001
- President: Jerry John Rawlings
- Parliamentary group: National Democratic Congress

Personal details
- Born: 12 September 1950 (age 76)
- Education: University of Ghana
- Occupation: Teacher

Theresa Abena Nyarko-Fofie (born 1950) is a Ghanaian politician and was a member of the First Parliament of the Fourth Republic of Ghana from 1993 to 1997 representing NkoranzaConstituency under the membership of the National Democratic Congress, and member of the 2nd parliament representing Nkoranza Constituency under the same party.

== Early life ==
Nyarko-Fofie was born on 12 September 1950 in the Brong Ahafo Region of Ghana into a Christian family. She obtained her Diploma degree in education from University of Ghana. She worked as an educationist before going into politics.

== Political career ==
Nyarko-Fofie began her political career in 1992 when she became the parliamentary candidate for the National Democratic Congress (NDC) to represent her constituency in the Brong Ahafo region of Ghana prior to the commencement of the 1992 Ghanaian parliamentary election. She was sworn into the First Parliament of the Fourth Republic of Ghana on 7 January 1993 after being pronounced winner at the 1992 Ghanaian election held on 29 December 1992.

She was thereafter re-elected at the 1996 Ghanaian general elections after defeating Yaw Kudom of the New Patriotic Party who obtained 18.00% of the total valid votes cast which was equivalent to 11,408 votes and Owoahene Justice Acheampong of the People's National Convention who obtained 2.20% of the total valid votes which was equivalent to 1,416 votes. She was pronounced winner after obtaining 49.70% of the total valid votes which was equivalent to 31,528 votes. She was elected on 7 January 1997. Nyarko-Fofie was elected into parliament on 7 January 1997 after being declared winner at the 1996 Ghanaian General Elections. She defeated Yaw Kudom of the New Patriotic Party. Theresa obtained 49.70% of the total votes cast whilst Yaw Kudom obtained 18.00%. After serving her 4 years in office, she decided not to run for another term and that decision gave room for Hayford Francis Amoako who won at the 2000 Ghanaian General Elections and was elected into office on 7 January 2001.

== Personal life ==
Theresah is a Christian.
