= Larbie Nii Adjei =

Ghanaian politician

Hon. Larbie Nii Adjei

Member of parliament for Tema East constituency
- In office 7 January 1993 – 7 January 1997
- President: Jerry John Rawlings
- Preceded by: Seth Laryea Tetteh
- Succeeded by: Ishmael Ashitey

Personal details
- Born: 24 March 1952 (age 74)
- Party: National Democratic Congress
- Education: Tashkent Institute for Engineers of Irrigation and Agriculture
- Occupation: Politician
- Profession: Irrigation Engineer

Larbie Nii Adjei is a Ghanaian politician and also an Irrigation Engineer. He served for Tema East constituency as a Member of the First Parliament of the Fourth Republic of Ghana in the Greater Accra Region of Ghana.

== Early life and education ==
Adjei was born on 24 March 1952. He schooled at Tashkent Institute for Engineers of Irrigation and Agriculture where he obtained a Master of Science in Irrigation Engineering.

== Politics ==
Adjei was elected as a member of the 1st Parliament of the 4th Republic during the 1992 Ghanaian parliamentary election on the ticket of the National Democratic Congress. He was preceded by Seth Laryea Tetteh, who was a Member of Parliament for Tema in the 3rd Republic of Ghana.

However, he lost the seat to Ishmael Ashitey of New Patriotic Party in 1996 Ghanaian General election who won with 33,421 votes representing 35.80% of the total valid votes hence defeating his opponents; Nii Adjei Larbie of the National Democratic Congress who polled 29,915 votes representing 32.00% of the total valid votes cast, Seth Laryea Tetteh of the Convention People's Party polled 4,211 votes which represent 4.50% and Frank Sontim-Bour Yendork of the People's National Convention polled 1,803 votes which represent 1.90% of the total votes cast.

In the 3rd Parliament of the 4th Republic of Ghana in the 2000 Ghanaian general elections, Ashitey was elected as the member of parliament for the Tema East constituency.

== Career ==
Larbie Nii Adjei was the former member of the First Parliament of the Fourth Republic of Ghana for the Tema East constituency who served from 7 January 1993 to 6 January 1997, He is an Engineer in Irrigation.

== Personal life ==
He is a Muslim.
