= Alhassan Ahmed Adams =

Ghanaian politician

Alhassan Ahmed Adam

Member of parliament for Mion constituency
- President: Jerry John Rawlings
- Preceded by: Oliver Sigli Mahamudu
- Succeeded by: Alabira Ibrahim
- Parliamentary group: National Democratic Congress

Personal details
- Born: 21 April 1950 (age 76)
- Occupation: Teacher

Alhassan Ahmed Adams is a Ghanaian politician and member of the First Parliament of the Fourth Republic of Ghana representing Mion Constituency under the membership of the National Democratic Congress.

== Early life and education ==
Alhassan was born on 21 April 1950. He attended Nalerigu Teacher Training College where he obtained his GCE Ordinary Level. He worked as a teacher before going into politics and subsequently became a parliamentarian.

== Politics ==
Alhassan began his political career in 1992 when he became the parliamentary candidate for the National Democratic Congress (NDC) to represent his constituency in the Northern region of Ghana prior to the commencement of the 1992 Ghanaian parliamentary election.

He was elected into the First Parliament of the Fourth Republic of Ghana on 7 January 1993 after being pronounced winner at the 1992 Ghanaian election held on 29 December 1992. He succeeded Oliver Sigli Mahamudu who was a member of parliament for the Constituency in the 3rd Republic of Ghana.

He lost his candidacy to his fellow party comrade Abu E Musah who lost to Alabira Ibrahim of the Convention People's Party at the 1996 Ghanaian general elections. Abu E Musah polled 18.00% of the total valid votes cast which was equivalent to 5,220 votes while Alabira Ibrahim polled 32.70% of the total valid votes cast which was equivalent to 9,519 votes.
