= Yusuf Iddrisu =

Ghanaian politician

Hon. Yusuf Iddrisu

Member of Parliament of Yendi constituency
- In office 7 January 1993 – 7 January 1997

Personal details
- Born: June 15, 1964 (age 62)
- Party: National Democratic Congress
- Education: Kwame Nkrumah University of Science and Technology
- Occupation: Politician
- Profession: Educator

Yusuf Iddrisu (born 15 June 1964) is a Ghanaian politician and an educator. He served as member of the first parliament of the fourth republic of Ghana for the Yendi constituency in the Northern Region of Ghana.

== Early life and education ==
Yusuf Iddrisu was born on June 15, 1964, in the Northern Region of Ghana. He attended Kwame Nkrumah University of Science and Technology and obtained a Bachelor of Arts in Book Industry.

== Career ==
Yusuf Iddrisu served as a member of parliament in Yendi constituency from 7 January 1993 to 7 January 1997. He was a teacher that time.

== Politics ==
Yusuf Iddrisu was first elected as member of the first parliament of the fourth republic of Ghana in 1992 Ghanaian parliamentary election on the ticket of the National Democratic Congress. During the 1996 Ghanaian general election, he lost the seat to Malik Al-Hassan Yakubu of the New Patriotic Party (NPP) who won the seat with 13,743 votes which represented 47.60% of the share. He defeated Sulemana Ibn Iddrisu, Jnr. of the National Democratic Congress who obtained 7,107 votes which represented 24.60% of the share and Nalari Nyoja John of the People's National Convention (PNC) who obtained 2,150 votes which represented 7.50% of the share.

== Personal life ==
He is a Muslim.
