= Patience Pomary =

Ghanaian Politician

Hon. Patience Pomary

Member of parliament for Hohoe North constituency
- In office 7 January 1993 – 7 January 1997
- President: Jerry John Rawlings
- Succeeded by: Nathaniel Kwadzo Aduadjoe

Personal details
- Born: 14 July 1940 (age 86)
- Party: National Democratic Congress
- Education: Seddoh Business Commercial College
- Occupation: Politician
- Profession: Entrepreneur

Patience Pomary (born 14 July 1940) is a Ghanaian politician and an entrepreneur. She served as a member of parliament for the Hohoe North constituency in the Volta Region of Ghana and the only female member of Parliament from the Volta region.

== Early life and education ==
Patience Pomary was born on 14 July 1940. She attended Seddoh Business Commercial College where she obtained a Diploma in English, Shorthand and Typing.

== Career ==
In the 1970s, Pomary moved to Hohoe as an employee of the Ghana Cocoa Marketing Board. Pomary is a former member of the first parliament of the fourth republic of Ghana from January 1993 to January 1997, She is an Entrepreneur.

== Politics ==
Pomary engaged in active politics during the revolutionary days in Ghana, and was part of the constituent assembly that drafted the 1992 constitution of Ghana. As well as a member of the 31st December Women's Movement in Ghana. In 1991, during the National Democratic Congress primaries, she won against two male opponents to represent the Hohoe North constituency. Pomary was first elected during the 1992 Ghanaian parliamentary election on the ticket of the National Democratic Congress, She served for one term in Parliament. She lost the seat in the 1996 Ghanaian general election to Nathaniel Kwadzo Aduadjoe who won the seat for the National Democratic Congress with 39,008 votes which represented 62.80% of the share by defeating Stanley Tsaku Harker of People's National Convention (PNC) who obtained 4,264 votes which represented 6.90% of the share; Anthony Akoto-Ampaw of Convention People's Party (CPP) who obtained 3,740 votes which represented 6.00% of the share and Ray Kakrabah-Quarshie of New Patriotic Party (NPP) who obtained 2,752 votes which represented 4.40% of the share.

In 2019, Former President Jerry John Rawlings gives a brand new vehicle to madam Pomary, she expressed her gratitude to the former president for his support, stating that she was overwhelmed by the gesture. Former president said : << Madam Pomary's dedication and selfless commitment to her people was very commendable and expressed the hope that persons who dedicate their lives to the good of their communities and their country will be recognized by their own to inspire others.

== Personal life ==
She is a Christian.
