= William Kwaku Asante =

Ghanaian politician

MP for Manhyia
- In office 7 January 1993 – 6 January 1997
- President: Jerry John Rawlings
- Preceded by: Charles Amankwah
- Succeeded by: Kwame Addo-Kufuor

Personal details
- Born: 16 August 1955 (age 71) Sepe Wusuansa, Ashanti Region, Gold Coast (now Ghana)
- Party: National Democratic Congress
- Education: London School of Accountancy
- Occupation: Politician
- Profession: Banker

William Kwaku Asante (born 16 August 1955) is a Ghanaian politician and a member of the First Parliament of the Fourth Republic representing the Manhyia Constituency in the Ashanti Region of Ghana.

== Early life and education ==
Asante was born on 16 August 1955 at Sepe Wusuansa in Kumasi, Ashanti Region of Ghana. He attended the Garden City Commercial College, where he obtained his GCE Ordinary Level certificate. He also attended the London School of Accountancy where he studied Accounting and was awarded his R.S.A. Stage II Accounting Certificate.

== Politics ==
He was elected into parliament on the ticket of the National Democratic Congress for the Manhyia Constituency during the 1992 Ghanaian parliamentary election. He was replaced by Yaw Addai Boadu to represent the National Democratic Congress in the 1996 Ghanaian general election. Yaw Addai Boadu subsequently lost the seat to his opponent Dr. Kwame Addo Kufour of the New Patriotic Party who polled 59,227 votes out of the total valid votes cast representing 63.30%, Yaw Addai Boadu on the other hand who polled 13,562 votes representing 14.50% of the total valid votes cast.

== Career ==
He is a Banker and former member of Parliament for the Manhyia Constituency. He served one term as the member of parliament for the constituency.

== Personal life ==
He is a Christian.
