= Paul Kpal Danzi =

Ghanaian politician

Hon. Paul Kpal Danzi

Member of the Ghana Parliament for Nabdam
- In office 7 January 1993 – 6 January 1997
- President: Jerry John Rawlings
- Preceded by: New
- Succeeded by: Moses Aduku Asaga

Personal details
- Party: National Democratic Congress
- Education: Wa Teacher Training College
- Occupation: Teacher

Paul Kpal Danzi is a Ghanaian politician, teacher, and a member of the First Parliament of the Fourth Republic of Ghana. He is a former member of Parliament for the Nabdam constituency in the Upper East Region a member of the National Democratic Congress political party in Ghana.

== Early life and education ==
He was born in the year 1942. He is an alumnus of the Wa Teacher Training College and obtained his Teachers' Training Certificate (Certificate A).

== Politics ==
He was elected into parliament on the ticket of the National Democratic Congress for the Nabdam constituency in the Upper East Region of Ghana during the 1992 Ghanaian parliamentary Election. He was succeeded by Moses Aduku Asaga also a member of the National Democratic Congress. Moses polled 8,490 votes out of the total valid votes cast representing 56.30% during the 1996 general election over his opponents Nicholas Nayembil Nonlant of the People's National Congress who polled 2,108 votes representing 14.00% and Edward Babah Sampanah of the Convention People's Party who polled 750 votes representing 5.00%.

== Career ==
Ackah is a teacher by profession. He was a Senior Superintendent of the Ghana Education Service. He had been a staff of the Ghana Education Service for 23 years prior to entering politics.

== Personal life ==
Danzi is a Christian and a member of the Catholic Church. He is married and a father of four children.
