= Alhassan Musah =

Ghanaian politician

Member of parliament for Kumbungu constituency
- President: Jerry John Rawlings
- Succeeded by: Muhammed Mumuni
- Parliamentary group: National Democratic Congress

Personal details
- Born: 6 June 1953 (age 73)
- Occupation: Teacher

Alhassan Musah is a Ghanaian politician and member of the First Parliament of the Fourth Republic of Ghana representing Kumbungu Constituency under the membership of the National Democratic Congress.

== Early life and education ==
Alhassan was born on 6 June 1953. He attended Tamale Technical Institute where he obtained his City & Guilds Certificate. He worked as a teacher before going into politics and subsequently became a Member of Parliament for the Kumbungu Constituency in the First Parliament of the Fourth Republic of Ghana.

== Politics ==
Alhassan began his political career in 1992 when he became the parliamentary candidate for the National Democratic Congress (NDC) to represent the Kumbungu constituency in the Northern region of Ghana prior to the commencement of the 1992 Ghanaian parliamentary election.

He was sworn into the First Parliament of the Fourth Republic of Ghana on 7 January 1993 after being pronounced winner at the 1992 Ghanaian election held on 29 December 1992.

He lost his candidacy to his fellow party comrade Alhaji Muhammed Mumuni who succeeded him by defeating Saeed Ahmed Abdallah of the Convention People's Party at the 1996 Ghanaian general elections. Muhammed polled 48.60% of the total valid votes cast which was equivalent to 13,495 votes while Saeed polled 27.00% which was equivalent to 7,498 votes.
