= Chibsah =

Chibsah is a surname. Notable people with the surname include:

- Ibrahim Nuhu Chibsah (born 1952), Ghanaian politician
- Raman Chibsah (born 1993), Ghanaian footballer
- Yussif Chibsah (born 1983), Ghanaian footballer
