= Isaac Kolibilla Batesimah =

Ghanaian politician

Member of Parliament for Nalerigu Constituency
- In office 7 January 1997 – 6 January 2001
- President: John Jerry Rawlings

Personal details
- Born: Nalerigu, Northern Region, Ghana
- Party: National Democratic Congress
- Education: E.P Training College
- Occupation: Politician
- Profession: Teacher

Isaac Kolibilla Batesimah is a Ghanaian Politician and a Member of the Second Parliament of the Fourth Republic representing the Narerigu Constituency in the Northern Region of Ghana.

== Early life and education ==
Isaac was born at Nalerigu in the Northern Region of Ghana. He attended the E.P Training College and obtained his certificate in Teaching. He was a teacher before becoming a Member of the Second Parliament.

== Politics ==
Isaac was inaugurated into the first parliament of the fourth republic of Ghana on 7 January 1993 after he was pronounced winner at the 1992 Ghanaian parliamentary election held on 29 December 1992.

He was then re-elected into the second parliament of the fourth republic of Ghana on the ticket of the National Democratic Congress for the Narerigu Constituency in the Northern Region of Ghana after he emerged winner at the 1996 Ghanaian general elections. He polled 19,142 votes out of the 28,118 valid votes cast representing 51.00% over Assani Issahaku Emmanuel who polled 5,051 votes representing 13.50%, Hamidu Napoleon Dawuni who polled 2,019 votes representing 5.40% and John Wuni Grumah who polled 1,906 votes representing 5.10%. He lost to Dr.Tia Sugri Alfred in the 2000 Party's parliamentary Primaries.

== Personal life ==
Batesimah is a Christian.
