= Jagri John Kokpah =

Ghanaian politician (born 1956)

John Jagri Kokpahi
- Succeeded by: Mohammed Jagri

Member of parliament for Zabzugu/Tatale Constituency
- In office 7 January 1997 – 6 January 2001
- President: John Jerry Rawlings

Personal details
- Born: 6 May 1956 Zabzugu/Tatale, Northern Region, Ghana
- Party: National Democratic Congress
- Education: Tamale Nurses College
- Occupation: Politician
- Profession: General nurse

John Jagri Kokpahi (born 6 May 1956) is a Ghanaian politician and a member of the First Parliament of the Fourth Republic Representing the Zabzugu/Tatale constitiency in the Northern Region of Ghana.

== Early life and education ==
John was born on 6 May 1956 at Tatale in the Northern Region of Ghana. He attended the Tamale Nursing Training College and obtained his Certificate in General Nursing.

== Career ==
John is a general nurse by profession aside being a former Ghanaian politician.

== Politics ==
John was first elected into parliament on the ticket of the National Democratic Congress representing the Zabzugu/Tatale Constituency in the Northern Region of Ghana during the December 1992 Ghanaian general election. In the 1996 Ghanaian general election, he polled 15,717 votes out of the 24,112 valid votes cast representing 44.40% over his opponents Mohamed Dramani of the New Patriotic Party who polled 5,437 votes representing15.30% and Jacob Nasanpi Nwulu who polled 2,958 votes representing 8.40%. However, during the National Democratic Congress' primaries before the 2000 Ghanaian general election lost the ticket to compete in the election in the name of the National Democratic Congress to Mohammed Jagri who won the elections with 8,237 votes representing 35.80%.

He was succeeded by Mohammed Jagri who was the member of parliament for the Zabzugu/Tatale Constituency in the 2nd parliament of the 4th Republic of Ghana.
