= Basit Abdulai Fuseini =

Ghanaian educationist and a politician

Member of parliament for Gakpegu/Sabongida constituency
- President: Jerry John Rawlings
- Succeeded by: Mustapha Ali Iddris
- Parliamentary group: National Democratic Congress

Personal details
- Born: 14 December 1942 (age 83)
- Occupation: Teacher

Basit Abdulai Fuseini (born 14 December 1942) is a Ghanaian politician and was a member of the First Parliament of the Fourth Republic of Ghana from 1993 to 1997 representing Gakpegu/Sabongida Constituency under the membership of the National Democratic Congress.

== Early life and education ==
Fuseini was born on 14 December 1942. He attended University of Cape Coast and University of Ghana where he obtained his Bachelor of Science (Ed), Bachelor of Science and Master of Science respectively. He worked as a teacher before going into politics.

== Politics ==
Fuseini began his political career in 1992 when he became the parliamentary candidate for the National Democratic Congress (NDC) to represent his constituency in the Northern region of Ghana prior to the commencement of the 1992 Ghanaian parliamentary election.

He was sworn into the First Parliament of the Fourth Republic of Ghana on 7 January 1993 after being pronounced winner at the 1992 Ghanaian election held on 29 December 1992.

He lost his seat at the 1996 Ghanaian general elections to Mustapha Ali Iddris of the New Patriotic Party. Iddris polled 42.40% of the total valid votes cast which was equivalent to 31,964 votes while Fuseini polled 32.00% which was equivalent to 24,107 votes.
