= Abdulai Muhammad Seidu =

Ghanaian politician (born 1946)

Member of parliament for Effia/Kwesimintsim
- In office 7 January 1993 – 6 January 1997
- President: Jerry John Rawlings

Personal details
- Born: 1946 (age 79–80)
- Occupation: Teacher

Abdulai Muhammad Seidu is a Ghanaian politician and member of the first parliament of the fourth republic of Ghana representing Effia/Kwesimintsim Constituency under the membership of the National Democratic Congress.

== Early life and education ==
Abdulai was born in 1946. He attended University of Cape Coast where he obtained his Bachelor of Education. He worked as a teacher before going into parliament.

== Politics ==
Abdulai began his political career in 1992 when he became the parliamentary candidate for the National Democratic Congress (NDC) to represent Obuasi constituency in the Ashanti region of Ghana prior to the commencement of the 1992 Ghanaian parliamentary election. He was elected into the first parliament of the fourth republic of Ghana on 7 January 1993 after being pronounced winner at the 1992 Ghanaian election held on 29 December 1992. He lost his seat to his Convention Peoples Party counterpart Joseph Evans Kwesi Abekah who claimed 51.30% of the total valid votes cast which was equivalent to 34,958 votes while Abdulai obtained 25.20% which was 17,153 votes in equivalence.
