= George Charles Quaynor-Mettle =

Ghanaian politician (born 1955)

Hon. George Charles Quaynor-Mettle

Member of parliament for the Ablekuma South constituency
- In office 1993-01-07 – 1997-01-07
- President: Jerry John Rawlings
- Succeeded by: Theresa Amerley Tagoe

Personal details
- Born: 7 October 1955 (age 71)
- Party: National Democratic Congress
- Education: University of Ghana
- Occupation: Politician
- Profession: Tutor

George Charles Quaynor-Mettle is a Ghanaian politician and a Tutor. He served as a member of the First Parliament of the Fourth Republic of Ghana in the Ablekuma South constituency in the Greater Accra Region of Ghana.

== Early life and education ==
Quaynor-Mettle was born on 7 October 1955, he obtained a Bachelor of Arts at the University of Ghana.

== Politics ==
Quaynor-Mettle was elected during the 1992 Ghanaian parliamentary election on the ticket of the National Democratic Congress as a member of the First Parliament of the Fourth Republic of Ghana. He lost the seat during the 1996 Ghanaian general election to Theresa Amerley Tagoe on the ticket of the New Patriotic Party. She obtained 39.90% of the total votes cast which is equivalent to 47,644 votes by defeating Ebo Hawkson of the National Democratic Congress who obtained 35.70% which is equivalent to 42,568 votes; Isaac Ashong Okai of Convention People's Party who obtained 2,275 votes which is equivalent to 1.90%; Samuel Addo Benlee Brown of People's National Convention who obtained 1,278 votes which is equivalent to 1.10% and Seth Markwei Commodore of National Convention Party who obtained 1,220 votes which is equivalent to 1.00%.

He was a member of the commission that lead the National Commission for Civic Education (NCCE)

== Personal life ==
He is a Christian
