= Emmanuel Baah Danquah =

Ghanaian politician

Member of Parliament for Asutifi North Constituency
- In office 7 January 1993 – 6 January 2001
- President: Jerry John Rawlings

Personal details
- Education: University of Ghana
- Occupation: Educationist

Emmanuel Baah Danquah is a Ghanaian politician and member of the 2nd parliament of the 4th republic of Ghana representing Asutifi North Constituency under the membership of the National Democratic Congress.

== Early life ==
Danquah was born on 20 February 1961 in the Brong Ahafo Region of Ghana. He obtained his Bachelor of Arts degree in economics from University of Ghana. He worked as an educationist before going into politics.

== Politics ==
Danquah began his political Journey in 1993 after he was pronounced winner at the 1992 Ghanaian parliamentary election held on 29 December 1992. He was elected into the 2nd parliament of the 4th republic of Ghana after he emerged winner at the 1996 Ghanaian General Elections. He defeated Georges Nsiah-Afriyie of the New Patriotic Party and Michael K.Manu of the People's National Convention.

Danquah claimed 40.80% of the total votes cast while Georges and Michael both claimed 35.60% and 1.10% respectively. Danquah was defeated by Paul Okoh of the New Patriotic Party who claimed 49.10% of the total votes cast.
