= Osman Ahmed Boakye =

Ghanaian politician

Member of Parliament for Asokwa West
- In office 7 January 1993 – 6 January 1997
- President: Jerry John Rawlings
- Preceded by: Constituency merged
- Succeeded by: Edward Osei-Kwaku

Personal details
- Born: 24 November 1948 (age 77)
- Education: T.I. Ahmadiyya Senior High School; Kwame Nkrumah University of Science and Technology; University of Ghana
- Occupation: Researcher

Osman Ahmed Boakye (24 November 1948) is a Ghanaian politician and was a member of the first parliament of the fourth republic of Ghana, elected in 1992 to represent Asokwa west constituency, under the membership of the National Democratic Congress.

== Early life and education ==
Boakye was born on 24 November 1948 in the Ashanti Region. He attended T. I. Ahmadiyya Secondary School in Kumasi and the University of Science and Technology (now the Kwame Nkrumah University of Science and Technology) for a pre degree course prior to entering the University of Ghana in Greater Accra Region where he obtained a bachelor's degree in Administration. He worked as research officer before going into politics.

== Politics ==
Boakye began his political career in 1992 when he became the parliamentary candidate for the National Democratic Congress (NDC) to represent Asokwa west constituency prior to the commencement of the 1992 Ghanaian parliamentary election. He assumed office as a member of the first parliament of the fourth republic of Ghana on 7 January 1993 after being pronounced winner at the 1992 Ghanaian election.

== Personal life ==
He is a Muslim.
