= Kobina Ebenezer Fosu =

Ghanaian politician (born 1952)

Hon. Kobina Ebenezer Fosu

Member of the Ghana Parliament for Asikuma/Odoben/Brakwa
- In office 6 January 1993 – 7 January 1997
- President: Jerry John Rawlings

MP for Asikuma Odoben Brakwa Constituency
- In office 7 January 1993 – 6 January 2001

Personal details
- Born: 6 May 1952 (age 74)
- Party: National Democratic Congress

Kobina Ebenezer Fosu (born 6 May 1952) is a Ghanaian politician and a member of the 1st and 2nd Parliaments of the 4th republic of Ghana, representing the Asikuma Odoben Brakwa Constituency in the central region of Ghana under the membership of the National Democratic Congress

== Early life and education ==
Fosu was born on 6 May 1952 at Breman Jamra in the central region of Ghana. He obtained a degree from the University of Ghana, Legon. He worked as a Barrister before going into politics. He is a Christian.

== Career ==
Fosu is a lawyer by profession and a former member of Parliament for the Asikuma Odoben Brakwa constituency in the central region of Ghana.

== Political career ==
Fosu was first elected into parliament on 7 January 1993 after he emerged winner at the 1992 Ghanaian general election. In 1996, he won a second term in Parliament by defeating Paul Collins Appia-Ofori of the New Patriotic Party after he obtained 47.50% total valid votes cast which is equivalent to 19,523 votes while his opposition obtained 33.20% which is equivalent to 13,641 votes.

He lost his seat at the 2000 Ghanaian general election after being defeated by Paul C. Appiah Ofori who obtained 51.90% of the total valid votes cast which is equivalent to 16,225 votes while Ebenezer obtained 43.40% which is equivalent to 13,559 votes. He held some Ministerial portfolios such as Minister without Portfolio 1993-1994, Central Regional Minister (1994-1995) Minister for Works and Housing (1995-1997) He became the Board Chairman of the State Housing Company (2014-2016) During the same period he became a Board member of the Energy Commission where he served as the Chairman of its Renewable Sub-Committee.
