= Amidu Seidu =

Ghanaian politician

Member of parliament for Wulensi constituency
- President: Jerry John Rawlings
- Succeeded by: Iddi Saani
- Parliamentary group: National Democratic Congress

Personal details
- Born: 23 April 1958 (age 68)
- Occupation: Marketer

Amidu Seidu is a Ghanaian politician and member of the First Parliament of the Fourth Republic of Ghana representing Wulensi Constituency under the membership of the National Democratic Congress.

== Early life and education ==
Amidu was born on 23 April 1958. He attended Institute of Management Studies where he obtained his Diploma in Marketing. He worked as a marketer before going into politics and became a Member of Parliament for the Wulensi Constituency in the First Parliament of the Fourth Republic of Ghana.

== Politics ==
Amidu began his political career in 1992 when he became the parliamentary candidate for the National Democratic Congress (NDC) to represent his constituency in the Northern region of Ghana prior to the commencement of the 1992 Ghanaian parliamentary election.

He was sworn into the First Parliament of the Fourth Republic of Ghana on 7 January 1993 after being pronounced winner at the 1992 Ghanaian election held on 29 December 1992. He was succeeded by Iddi Saani of the New Patriotic Party in 1997 after he lost his seat at the 1996 Ghanaian general elections to him. Iddi polled 26.70% of the total valid votes cast which was equivalent to 6,636 votes while Amidu polled 18.70% which was equivalent to 4,644 votes.
