= Emmanuel Kwame Boakye =

Ghanaian politician

MP for Offinso North
- In office 7 January 1993 – 6 January 1997
- President: Jerry John Rawlings

Personal details
- Born: Nkenkaaso, Ashanti region Ghana)
- Party: National Democratic Congress
- Education: Gbewaa College of Education, Ghana
- Occupation: Politician
- Profession: Teacher

Emmanuel Kwame Boakye is a Ghanaian politician and a member of the first Parliament of the fourth Republic representing the Offinso North constituency in the Ashanti region. He served for one term as a member of parliament.

== Early life and education ==
Boakye was born on 15 December 1944 at Nkenkaaso in the Ashanti Region of Ghana. He attended the Government Training College in Pusiga (now known as the Gbewaa College of Education) where he obtained his Teachers' Training Certificate.

== Career ==
Boakye is a teacher by profession and a former member of Parliament for the Offinso North Constituency in the Ashanti Region of Ghana.

== Politics ==
Boakye was first elected into Parliament on the Ticket of the National Democratic Congress to represent the Offinso North Constituency in the Ashanti Region of Ghana. He won the seat during the 1992 Ghanaian parliamentary election. He contested again in 1996 as an independent candidate and lost the seat to Dr. Kofi K. Apraku who polled 10,456 votes representing 37.80% out of the total valid votes cast. Nana Oduro Baah of the National Democratic Congress polled 10,257 votes representing 37.10%, Nana Yaw Joseph of the People's National Convention polled 358 votes representing 1.30%, and Emmanuel Kwame Boakye also polled 357 votes representing 1.30%.

== Personal life ==
Boakye is a Christian.
