= Joseph King Amankrah =

Ghanaian politician

MP for Amenfi West
- In office 7 January 1993 – 6 January 1997
- President: Jerry John Rawlings

Personal details
- Born: Western Region, Ghana
- Party: National Democratic Congress
- Education: University of Cape Coast, University of Bordeaux
- Occupation: Politician
- Profession: Teacher

Joseph King Amankrah is a Ghanaian politician and a member of the first Parliament of the fourth Republic representing the Amenfi West constituency in the Western Region of Ghana.

== Early life and education ==
Amankrah was born in 1944 at Amenfi West in the Western Region of Ghana. He attended the University of Cape Coast and the University of Bordeaux and obtained his Bachelor of Arts.

== Politics ==
Amankrah was first elected into Parliament on the ticket of the National Democratic Congress during the 1992 Ghanaian parliamentary election for the Amenfi West constituency in the Western Region of Ghana. He was defeated by Abraham Kofi Ashante during the Parliamentary Primaries. Asante polled 16,085 votes representing 46.70% over his opposition Samuel Alberto Tekyi of the New Patriotic Party who polled 8,311 votes representing 24.10%.

== Career ==
Chibsah is a teacher by profession and a former member of parliament for the Amenfi West constituency in the Western Region.

== Personal life ==
He is a Christian.
