= Abubakar Alhassan MacNamara =

Ghanaian politician

Hon. Abubakar Alhassan MacNamara

Member of parliament for Savelugu constituency
- In office 7 January 1993 – 6 January 1997
- President: Jerry John Rawlings
- Preceded by: P. W. Iddrisu Ardani
- Succeeded by: Mary Salifu Boforo

Personal details
- Born: 1947 (age 78–79)
- Party: National Democratic Congress
- Education: Bagabaga Training College
- Occupation: Politician
- Profession: Teacher

Abubakar Alhassan MacNamara (born 1947) is a Ghanaian politician and also a teacher. He served for Savelugu constituency as a Member of Parliament in the Northern Region of Ghana.

== Early life and education ==
MacNamara was born in 1947. He attended Bagabaga Training College and obtained a Teachers' Training Certificate.

== Career ==
MacNamara is a former Member of the First Parliament of the Fourth Republic of Ghana for Savelugu constituency. He served from 7 January 1993 to 6 January 1997. He is a teacher.

== Politics ==
Abubakar Alhassan MacNamara was elected as member of the First Parliament of the Fourth Republic of Ghana during the 1992 Ghanaian parliamentary election on the ticket of the National Democratic Congress. He was preceded by P. W. Iddrisu Ardani.

During the 1996 Ghanaian general election, Mary Salifu Boforo took the seat from MacNamara. She won the seat for the National Democratic Congress by defeating Alhassan Abudulai Abubakari of the New Patriotic Party; Bawa Muhammed Baba of Convention People's Party and Baba Issah of People's National Convention by obtaining 50.90% of the total valid votes cast which is equivalent to 14,971 votes while her counterparts both shared 19.00%; 7.20% and 1.40% which is equivalent to 5,585 votes; 2,108 votes and 426 votes respectively.

== Personal life ==
Abubakar Alhassan MacNamara is a Muslim.
