= Samuel Brenyah =

Ghanaian politician

MP for Nsuta-Kwamang-Beposo
- In office 7 January 1993 – 6 January 1997
- President: Jerry John Rawlings
- Preceded by: New
- Succeeded by: Kwame Osei-Prempeh

Personal details
- Born: 27 January 1960 (age 66) Sekyere Kwamang, Ashanti Region, Ghana
- Party: National Democratic Congress
- Education: Opoku Ware School
- Alma mater: University of Ghana, University of Ouagadougou
- Occupation: Politician
- Profession: Linguist

Samuel Brenyah (born 27 January 1960) is a Ghanaian politician and a member of the First Parliament of the Fourth Republic representing the Nsuta-Kwamang-Beposo Constituency in the Ashanti Region of Ghana. He represented the constituency on the ticket of the National Democratic Congress.

== Early life and education ==
Samuel Brenyah was born on 27 January 1960 at Sekyere Kwamang in the Ashanti Region of Ghana. He attended Opoku Ware School and the University of Ghana where he obtained his Bachelor of Arts in linguistics. He also attended the University of Ouagadougou and obtained a Higher School Certificate.

== Politics ==
Samuel Brenyah was elected into parliament on the ticket of the National Democratic Congress for the Nsuta-Kwamang-Beposo Constituency in the Ashanti Region of Ghana during the 1992 Ghanaian parliamentary election.

== Career ==
He is a former member of parliament for the Nsuta-Kwamang-Beposo Constituency and a linguist by profession.

== Personal life ==
He is a Christian.
