= Ben Baluri Saibu =

Ghanaian politician

Member of parliament for West Mamprusi
- In office 7 January 1993 – 6 January 1997
- President: Jerry John Rawlings
- Parliamentary group: National Democratic Congress

Personal details
- Born: 1949 (age 76–77)
- Education: University of Ghana
- Occupation: Lawyer

Ben Baluri Saibu is a Ghanaian politician and member of the first parliament of the fourth republic of Ghana representing West Mamprusi constituency under the membership of the National Democratic Congress (NDC).

== Early life and education ==
Ben was born in 1949. He attended University of Ghana where he obtained his Bachelor of Arts and Bachelor of Laws in English and Law respectively. He worked as a legal practitioner before going into parliament.

== Politics ==
He began his political career in 1992 when he became the parliamentary candidate for the National Democratic Congress (NDC) to represent his constituency in the Northern region of Ghana prior to the commencement of the 1992 Ghanaian parliamentary election.

He was sworn into the First Parliament of the Fourth Republic of Ghana on 7 January 1993 after being pronounced winner at the 1992 Ghanaian election held on 29 December 1992.

After serving his four years tenure in office, Ben lost his candidacy to his fellow party comrade Susana Adam. She defeated Stephen Sumani Nayina of the Convention People's Party (CPP) who polled 8,761 votes which was equivalent to 17.70% of the total valid votes cast, Amadu Sulemana of the People's National Convention (PNC) who polled 3,833 votes which was equivalent to 7.70% of the total valid votes cast and Sulemana Wakaso Musah of the National Convention Party (NCP) who polled 938 votes which was equivalent to 1.90% of the total valid votes cast at the 1996 Ghanaian general elections. Susan polled 23,021 votes which was equivalent to 46.40% of the total valid votes cast. She was thereafter elected on 7 January 1997.
