= Sylvester A. Mensah =

Ghanaian politician

Hon. Sylvester A. Mensah

Member of Parliament for Dade-Kotopon Constituency
- In office 7 January 1997 – 6 January 2001

Personal details
- Born: Accra
- Party: National Democratic Congress
- Occupation: Chief executive officer of national health insurance authority, ghana
- Profession: Politician, banker, technocrat, lecturer and author

Sylvester A. Mensah is a Ghanaian politician, writer, lecturer, finance professional and a health insurance technocrat. He has also served as Member of Parliament for Dade-Kotopon constituency in Ghana.

== Early life and education ==
Mensah was born in Ghana and was raised around the world. He had his tertiary education at the University of Ghana where he obtained his Bachelor of Science and then his Masters in Business Administration(MBA) in Finance and Administration respectfully.

== Career ==
Mensah is an author (writer), a Financial Professional and a Health insurance Technocrat. He is also a Senior Lecturer at the University of Professional Studies, Accra Ghana. He was once the former chief executive officer of the National Health Insurance Authority.

== Politics ==
Mensah is a politician of the National Democratic Congress. He became the Member of Parliament for the Dade-Kotopon Constituency after contesting in the 1996 Ghanaian Parliamentary Elections, which he won with 36,959 making 41.50% of the total valid votes cast. This was against his opponents; Cecilia Eguakun of the New Patriotic Party who polled 30,484 representing 34.30% of the total valid vote cast, Mensa Mac Granaky Quaye an Independent Candidate who also polled 3,919 which represented 4.40% of the total valid votes cast, Christian Randolph Lartey of the People's National Convention who polled 1,703 which represented 1.90% of the total votes cast and Ivor Kobina Greenstreet of the Convention People's Party had no votes. In the year 2019 he was an aspirant for the Flagbearer of the National Democratic Congress but lost to John Dramani Mahama.
