= Joseph Kweku Enos =

Ghanaian politician

Joseph Kweku Enos (1941–2024) was a Ghanaian politician and member of the first parliament of the fourth republic of Ghana representing Ajumako/Enyan/Essiam constituency under the membership of the National Democratic Congress (NDC).

== Early life and education ==
Joseph was born on 2 July 1941. He attended University of Kiel where he studied Medical Specialist in Obstetrics and Gynaecology. He worked as a Medical Doctor before going into parliament. He also founded Dwenho Specialist Clinic at Agona Swedru in 1985.

== Politics ==
He began his political career in 1992 when he became one of the founding members and the parliamentary candidate for the National Democratic Congress (NDC) to represent his constituency in the Central Region of Ghana prior to the commencement of the 1992 Ghanaian parliamentary election.

He was sworn into the First Parliament of the Fourth Republic of Ghana on 7 January 1993 after being pronounced winner at the 1992 Ghanaian election held on 29 December 1992.

After serving his four years tenure in office, Joseph lost his seat to his counterpart in the New Patriotic Party (NPP), Isaac Eduasor Edumadze. He defeated Joseph K. Enos of the National Democratic Congress (NDC) who polled 14,839 votes which was equivalent to 30.40% of the total valid votes cast, Lawrence Yaw Awuah of the Convention People's Party (CPP) who polled 3,672 votes which was equivalent to 7.50% of the total valid votes cast and Joseph Mensah of the People's National Convention (PNC) who polled 782 votes which was equivalent to 1.60% of the total valid votes cast at the 1996 Ghanaian general elections. Isaac polled 15,660 votes which was equivalent to 32.10% of the total valid votes cast. He was thereafter elected on 7 January 1997.

== Personal life ==
He had a wife, 6 children, 14 grandchildren and 11 siblings. He was also a devout Christian. After his political career, he also volunteered at the SDA hospital at Agona Asaman and North Suntreso Hospital in Kumasi until his retirement in 2011.
