= Moses Mabengba Bukari =

Ghanaian politician (born 1956)

Hon. Moses Mabengba Bukari

Member of Parliament for Saboba Constituency
- In office 7 January 1993 – 6 January 1997
- President: Jerry John Rawlings
- In office 7 January 1997 – 6 January 2000
- President: Jerry John Rawlings

Personal details
- Born: 11 March 1956 (age 70)
- Party: National Democratic Congress
- Profession: Politician

Moses Mabengba Bukari (born 11 March 1956) is a Ghanaian politician. He was the member of Parliament that represented Saboba Constituency in the Northern Region of Ghana in the 1st and 2nd Parliament of the 4th Republic of Ghana.

== Early life and education ==
Moses was born on 11 March 1956 at Saboba in the Northern Region of Ghana. He is an alumnus of the Advanced Teacher's Training College where he obtained his Diploma in Mathematics.

== Politics ==
Moses was first elected into Parliament in December 1992 election which made him to be part of the first Parliament of 4th Republic under the presidency of Jerry John Rawlings. He was elected to represent Saboba constituency in the Northern Region of Ghana. He served from 7 January 1993 to 6 January 1996 which was the end of his first term.

He was later re-elected into Parliament of Ghana on the ticket of the National Democratic Congress during the December 1996 Ghanaian general election. He polled 12,744 votes out of the 15,933 valid votes cast representing 65.80% over Joshua Yakpir Jagri of the New Patriotic Party who polled 3,189 voes representing 16.50%. He was defeated by Nayon Bilijo in his Party's Parliamentary Primaries. He once served as a Northern Regional Minister. He also 2nd National Vice Chairman for the National Democratic Congress where he was sworn in on 6 August 2019. He served as District Chief Executive (DCE), Deputy Minister, Minister and an Ambassador spanning 21 years of his entire political career

== Career ==
Moses was a Teacher and the former Head of Mathematics Department of University of Education, Winneba. He was the Northern Regional Minister.

== Personal life ==
Moses is a Christian.
