= Adam Baako Nortey Yeboah =

Ghanaian politician (born 1950)

The Honourable Adam Baako Nortey Yeboah

Member of Parliament for the Ablekuma North constituency
- In office 7 January 1993 – 7 January 1997
- President: Jerry John Rawlings
- Succeeded by: Kwamena Bartels

Personal details
- Born: 11 May 1950 (age 76)
- Party: National Democratic Congress
- Education: International Correspondence Schools
- Occupation: Politician
- Profession: Manager

Adam Baako Nortey Yeboah (born 11 May 1950) is a Ghanaian politician and also a manager. He was a member of the 1st parliament of the 4th republic for the Ablekuma North constituency in the Greater Accra Region of Ghana.

== Early life and education ==
Yeboah was born on 11 May 1950. He attended International Correspondence Schools where he obtained a certificate as a storekeeper.

== Career ==
He was a member of the First Parliament of the Fourth Republic of Ghana in 1992 Ghanaian parliamentary election. He was a manager.

== Politics ==
Yeboah was elected as a member of the 1st Parliament of the 4th Republic of Ghana during the 1992 Ghanaian parliamentary election. He was sworn into office on 7 January 1993 on the ticket of the National Democratic Congress.

In the 1996 elections, Kwamena Bartels won the seat for the New Patriotic Party as a member of the second parliament of the fourth republic of Ghana with a majority votes of 35,747 representing 47.20% of the total valid votes beating his opponents: Denanyoh Ben Mensah of National Democratic Congress 20,214 votes with 26.70% of the share and Nathaniel Addo of NCP 2,559 votes representing 3.40% of the share.

He retained the Ablekuma North constituency seat as a member of parliament during the 2000 Ghanaian general elections .

== Personal life ==
He is Muslim.
