= Afieye Ashong =

Ghanaian politician

Hon. Afieye Ashong

Member of Parliament for Kpone Katamanso Constituency
- In office 7 January 1996 – 6 January 2001

Member of Parliament for Kpone-Katamanso Constituency
- In office 7 January 2001 – 6 January 2005

Personal details
- Party: National Democratic Congress
- Profession: Politician

Beatrice Love Naa-Afieye Ashong is a Ghanaian politician and a member of the 3rd Parliament of the 4th Republic of Ghana. She is also a founder of a non-governmental organization, 'Gods Love Society' and a former Member of Parliament for the kpone Katamanso constituency of the Greater Accra Region of Ghana.

== Early life and education ==
Ashong is from Kpone Katamanso in the Greater Accra region of Ghana.

== Politics ==
Ashong was a member of the 2nd and 3rd Parliaments of the 4th Republic of Ghana. Her political career began in 1996 when she contested as a parliamentary candidate in the 1996 Ghanaian general election as a representative for the Kpone Katamanso constituency on the ticket of the National Democratic Congress. She won her first seat with a total of 7,901 votes, being 59.50% of the total valid votes cast. She contested again in the 2000 Ghanaian general election and maintained her seat with 5,420 votes, 51.35% of the total votes cast. Her political career ended when she made a declaration not to contest in any elections again during her last term in office in January 2004.

== Elections ==
During the 1996 Ghanaian General Elections, Ashong won over her opponents with 7,901 votes casts representing 59.50% of the total votes cast to represent Kpone Katamansonas in the Second Parliament of the Fourth Republic of Ghana. Her opponents include George T. Noye of the New Patriotic Party who polled 2,609 votes which represent 19.60% of the total votes cast, Emmanuel Kweku Sagoe of the National Convention Party also polled 562 representing 4.20% of the total votes cast and Theophilus Tei Okunor of the People's National Convention who also polled 138 votes representing 1.00% of the total votes cast.

Ashong was again elected as member of parliament for the Kpone Katamanso constituency in the 3rd parliament of the 4th republic in the 2000 Ghanaian general elections. She was elected on the ticket of the National Democratic Congress. Her constituency was a part of the 6 parliamentary seats out of 22 seats won by the National Democratic Congress in that election for the Brong Ahafo Region. The National Democratic Congress won a minority total of 92 parliamentary seats out of 200 seats in the 3rd parliament of the 4th republic of Ghana. She was elected with 5420 votes out of 10,554 total valid votes cast. This was equivalent to 52.2% of the total valid votes cast. She was elected over Emmanuel Amprong Agbozo of the New Patriotic Party, Godfried Allan Lomotey of the Convention People's Party, Theophilus Tei Okunor of the People's National Convention and Isaac Newtown A. Tetteh of the National Reform Party. These obtained 3,066, 1,297, 418 and 177votes respectively out of the total valid votes cast. These were equivalent to 29.5%, 12.5%, 4.0% and 1.7% respectively of total valid votes cast.
