= Kwaku Addai-Gyambrah =

Ghanaian politician

Kwaku Addai-Gyambrah is a Ghanaian politician and member of the first parliament of the fourth republic of Ghana representing Upper Denkyira constituency under the membership of the National Democratic Congress (NDC).

== Early life and education ==
Kwaku was born on 21 August 1938. He attended Kwame Nkrumah University of Science and Technology (KNUST) where he obtained his Bachelor of Pharmacy in Pharmacy. He worked as a pharmacist before going into parliament.

== Politics ==
He began his political career in 1992 when he became the parliamentary candidate for the National Democratic Congress (NDC) to represent his constituency in the Central Region of Ghana prior to the commencement of the 1992 Ghanaian parliamentary election.

He was sworn into the First Parliament of the Fourth Republic of Ghana on 7 January 1993 after being pronounced winner at the 1992 Ghanaian election held on 29 December 1992.

After serving his four years tenure in office, Kwaku lost his seat to his counterpart in the New Patriotic Party (NPP), Clement Charles Omar Nyanor. He defeated Addai-Gyambrah of the National Democratic Congress (NDC) who polled 20,651 votes representing 36.70% of the total votes cast and Richard Anane Adabor of the Convention People`s Party who polled 0 votes representing 0.00% of the total votes cast at the 1996 Ghanaian general elections. Clement polled 24,981 votes which was equivalent to 44.30% of the total valid votes cast. He was thereafter elected on 7 January 1997.
