= Yaw Baning-Darko =

Ghanaian politician

Yaw Baning Darko

Member of parliament for Atiwa Constituency
- In office 7 January 1997 – 6 January 2001
- Preceded by: Jerry John Rawlings

Personal details
- Born: Atiwa, Eastern Region Ghana)
- Party: New Patriotic Party
- Occupation: Politician

Yaw Baning-Darko is a Ghanaian politician and a member of the Second Parliament of the Fourth Republic representing the Atiwa Constituency in the Eastern region of Ghana.

== Early life ==
He was born at Atiwa in the Eastern Region of Ghana.

== Politics ==
He was first elected into Parliament on the Ticket of the New Patriotic Party for the Atiwa constituency in the Eastern region in the December 1996 Ghanaian general election. He polled 19,735 votes out of the 31,731 valid votes cast representing 50.50% over his opponents Ben Ohene-Kwapong of the Convention People's Party who polled 10,480 votes representing 26.80% and Emmanuel Dakwa Adae of the People's National Congress who polled 1,516 votes representing 3.90%. He was defeated by Yaw Brempong Yeboah in his party's Parliamentary Primaries.
