= Peter Kwaw =

Ghanaian politician

MP forLower West Akim
- In office 7 January 2001 – 6 January 2005
- President: John Agyekum Kufour

Personal details
- Born: Lower West Akim, Eastern Region
- Party: New Patriotic Party
- Occupation: Politician

Peter Kwaw is a Ghanaian Politician and a member of the Third Parliament of the Fourth Republic of Ghana representing the Lower West Akim Constituency in the Eastern Region.

== Early life and education ==
Kwaw was born at Lower West Akim in the Eastern Region of Ghana.

== Politics ==
Kwaw was first elected into Parliament on the ticket of the New Patriotic Party during the December 2000 Ghanaian General Elections. He polled 18,103 votes out of 32,253 valid votes cast representing 56.10% of the total valid votes cast. His constituency was a part of the 18 parliamentary seats out of 26 seats won by the New Patriotic Party in that election for the Eastern Region. He was elected over Isaac Nti-Ababio Newton of the National Democratic Congress, Felix Atta-Owusu of the National Reformed Party, Mark Ayitey Kwablah of the Convention Peoples Party, Joseph Otoo-Essilfie of the United Ghana Movement and Hassan Al-Haji Salisu of the Peoples National Convention. These won 12,768, 623, 342, 234 and 183 votes out of the total valid votes cast respectively. These were equivalent to 39.60%, 1.90%,1.10%, 0.70% and 0.60% respectively of total valid votes.

== Career ==
Kwaw is a former member of parliament for the Lower West Akim Constituency in the Eastern Region of Ghana from 2001 to 2005.
