= Ibrahim Nuhu Chibsah =

Ghanaian politician

MP for Old Tafo-Suame
- In office 7 January 1993 – 6 January 1997
- President: Jerry John Rawlings
- Preceded by: New
- Succeeded by: Osei Kyei Mensah Bonsu

Personal details
- Born: 11 April 1952 (age 74) Ashanti Region, Ghana
- Party: National Democratic Congress
- Education: Adabie Commercial Institute
- Occupation: Politician
- Profession: Clerk

Ibrahim Nuhu Chibsah (born 11 April 1952) is a Ghanaian politician and a member of the first Parliament of the fourth Republic representing the Old Tafo Suame constituency in the Ashanti region.

== Early life and education ==
Ibrahim Nuhu Chibsah was born on 11 April 1952 at Old Tafo in the Ashanti region of Ghana. He attended the Adabie Commercial Institute in Kumasi and obtained his Road Safety Audit Stage 1 certificate after studying commerce.

== Politics ==
Chibsah was first elected into Parliament on the ticket of the National Democratic Congress during the 1992 Ghanaian parliamentary election for the Old Tafo Suame constituency in the Ashanti region. He lost to Paul Yeboah R. K in the 1996 Parliamentary primaries.

== Career ==
Chibsah is a clerk by profession and a former member of parliament for the Old Tafo Suame Constituency in the Ashanti Region of Ghana.

== Personal life ==
He is a Christian.
