= Yaw Manu-Yeboah =

Ghanaian Politician and former member of parliament for Sunyani East

Hon. Yaw Manu-Yeboah

Member of parliament for Sunyani East constituency
- In office 7 January 1993 – 7 January 1997
- President: Jerry John Rawlings
- Succeeded by: Joseph Henry Mensah

Personal details
- Born: 27 September 1951 (age 75)
- Party: National Democratic Congress
- Education: University of Cape Coast; University de Bordeaux III
- Occupation: Politician
- Profession: Educationist

Yaw Manu-Yeboah (born 27 September 1951) is a Ghanaian politician and educationist. He was a member of the First Parliament of the Fourth Republic of Ghana from 1993 to 1997. He was a member of parliament for Sunyani East Constituency in the Brong-Ahafo region of Ghana, under the membership of the National Democratic Congress.

== Early life and education ==
Manu- Yeboah was born 27 September 1951. He attended University of Cape Coast and University de Bordeaux III where he studied Education and French and obtained his Bachelor of Arts and Diploma degrees respectively. He worked as a teacher.

== Politics ==
Manu- Yeboah is the first member of parliament to represent Sunyani East constituency which was hither to Sunyani constituency. He contested the seat on the ticket of National Democratic Congress (NDC) and won. After the elections, the authenticity of the parliamentary results in the December 1992 electoral results of Sunyani East was contested in court by Joseph Henry Mensah of the New Patriotic Party (NPP), who claimed to be the winner of the Sunyani East seat. Manu- Yeboah served for just one term in parliament. He was succeeded by Joseph Henry Mensah in 1996.

The National Democratic Congress (NDC) led by Jerry John Rawlings won 80.95% of the votes in the presidential and parliamentary with 17 seats in Sunyani East, in the general elections in December 1992. This victory, coupled with other victories in other constituencies gave the NDC majority of in parliament. There were allegations of electoral rigging of some 200,000 ballot papers being thumb printed before the general elections. And cases of impersonation of electoral officers at Boahen-Korkor and Methodist middle 'B' in the Sunyani East constituency as well as Zongo in Techiman South.

Manu- Yeboah was sworn into the First Parliament of the Fourth Republic of Ghana on 7 January 1993 after being pronounced winner at the 1992 Ghanaian election held on 29 December 1992.

== Personal life ==
He is a Christian.
