= Fanteakwa (Ghana parliament constituency) =

Ghana parliament constituency

- constituency for the Parliament of Ghana
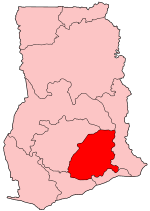
- District: Fanteakwa District
- Region: Eastern Region of Ghana

Current constituency
- Party: New Patriotic Party
- MP: Kwabena Amankwah Asiamah

The Fanteakwa constituency is in the Eastern region of Ghana. The current member of Parliament for the constituency is Kwabena Amankwah Asiamah. He was elected on the ticket of the New Patriotic Party (NPP) and won a majority of 5,246 votes more than candidate closest in the race, to win the constituency election to become the MP. He succeeded Kwadjo Agyei Addo who had represented the constituency in the 4th Republican parliament.

== See also ==
- List of Ghana Parliament constituencies
