= Kwaku Acheampong Bonful =

Ghanaian politician

Member of parliament for Prestea-Huni Valley Constituency
- In office 7 January 1997 – 6 January 2001
- President: John Jerry Rawlings

Personal details
- Born: 31 January 1947 Prestea-Huni Valley, Western Region, Ghana
- Died: 1 August 2002 (aged 55)
- Party: National Democratic Congress
- Education: University of Ghana
- Occupation: Politician
- Profession: Lawyer

Kwaku Acheampong Bonful (born January 31, 1947) was a Ghanaian politician and a member of the First and Second Parliament of the Fourth Republic representing the Prestea-Huni Valley constituency in the Western Region of Ghana.

== Early life and education ==
Bonful was born on 31 January 1947 at Prestea-Huni Valley in the Western Region of Ghana. He attended the Kalini Party of School, Germany, and obtained his certificate. He again attended the University of Ghana and the Ghana School of Law and obtained his LL.B and his Bachelor of Law after studying political science of law.

== Politics ==
Bonful was first elected into Parliament on the ticket of the National Democratic Congress for the Prestea-Huni Valley Constituency in the Western Region of Ghana during the 1992 Ghanaian General Elections. He was re-elected during the 1996 General Elections. He won with 19,433 votes out of the valid votes cast representing 32.90% over Akwasi Gyima-Bota, Benjamin Bekoe, Emmanuel Ewudzi, Joseph Imbiah-Tismark, Nana Nuako and Albert Kwaku Obbin who polled 18,498 votes, 2,234 votes, 1,618 votes, 1,350 votes, 0 vote and 0 vote respectively. He was defeated by Albert Kwaku Obbin of the New Patrriotic Party who polled 19,131 votes representing 48.40% against Bonful who was his nearest competitor and polled 12,240 votes representing 31.00% out of the 100% votes cast.

== Career ==
Bonful was a deputy minister of interior and a former member of Parliament for the Prestea-Huni Valley Constituency from 1993 to 2001. He was also a lawyer by profession.

== Death ==
Bonful died in a motor accident on Tarkwa-Bogoso road on Thursday. He died on 1 August 2002.
