= Mathew Kojo Kum =

Ghanaian politician

MP for Tarkwa -Nsuaem
- In office 7 January 1993 – 6 January 1997
- President: Jerry John Rawlings

Personal details
- Born: 31 August 1945 (age 80) Tarkwa -Nsuaem, Western Region Gold Coast (now Ghana)
- Party: National Democratic Congress
- Occupation: Politician
- Profession: Administrative manager

Mathew Kojo Kum (born 31 August 1945) is a Ghanaian politician and a member of the first Parliament of the fourth Republic representing the Tarkwa-Nsuaem constituency in the Western region of Ghana. He represented the National Democratic Congress.

== Early life and education ==
Kum was born on 31 August 1945 at Tarkwa-Nsuaem in the Western Region of Ghana. He attended the Advance Teacher Training College and obtained his Teachers' Training Certificate in Geography.

== Politics ==
Kum was first elected into Parliament on the ticket of the National Democratic Congress for the Tarkwa-Nsuaem Constituency in the Western Region of Ghana during the 1992 Ghanaian General Elections. He was defeated by Joseph Ghansah of the convention People's Party.

== Career ==
Kum is an administrative manager by profession and a former member of Parliament for the Tarkwa-Nsuaem Constituency in the Western Region of Ghana.

== Personal life ==
Kum is a Christian.
