= Kumasi Nurses and Midwifery Training School =

College in Ghana

Nursing and Midwifery Training College, Kumasi
- Other names: KNMTC
- Former names: Nurses' and Midwifery Training College, Kumasi
- Motto: Enter to learn, Go out to serve
- Type: Public Tertiary Health Institution
- Established: 1957
- Academic affiliations: Kwame Nkrumah University of Science and Technology
- Principal: Joana Owusu Danso
- Location: Kumasi, Ashanti Region, Ghana; 6.6921°N 1.6329°W
- Website: nmtcksi.edu.gh

The Kumasi Nurses' Training College, now Kumasi Nursing and Midwifery Training College is public tertiary health institution in Kumasi in the Ashanti Region of Ghana. The college is in the Kumasi Metropolitan Assembly. The school is located at the premises of the Komfo Anokye Teaching Hospital, Kumasi.

== Brief history ==
Kumasi Nursing and Midwifery Training College was founded in 1957 by the Medical Mission Sisters of the Kumasi Church. The school offers two Basic Diploma Programs, Nursing and midwifery. Affiliated to the second biggest health facility in the country, the college provides high standard theoretical and clinical coursework in all the aspects of diploma standard general nursing and midwifery. The activities of the institution is supervised by the Ministry of Health. The college now awards direct diploma Diploma in Nursing and Midwifery after students from the institution have successfully completed a three-year training programme. The institution is accredited by the National Accreditation Board. The Nurses and Midwifery Council (NMC) is the main body that regulates the activities, curriculum and examination of the school. The council's mandate Is enshrined under section 4(1) of N.R.C.D 117.

== Academic programmes ==
The programmes offered in this institution are divided into three:

- Basic programmes
- Post basic programmes
- Certificate programmes

=== Basic programmes ===
- Registered General nurse (RGN) Diploma
- Registered Mental Nurse (RMN) Diploma
- Registered Midwifery (RM) Diploma (females only)
- Registered Community Health Nurse (RCHN) Diploma
- Technical Officer Community Health, (Nutrition option) Diploma
- Technical Officer Community Health, (Disease control) Diploma
- Technical Officer Health Information, Diploma
- Technical Officer Medical Laboratory Technology, Diploma
- Technical Officer Environmental Health, Diploma
- Technical Officer Oral Health, Diploma
- Diploma in Community Medicine (Medical Assistants) Diploma
- Certificate in Community Health Nursing,(CHN)
- Certificate in Environmental Health (Environmental Health Assistants)
- Certificate in Community Health (Field Technicians)
- Certificate in Clinical Health Care (Health Assistants Clinical)
- Certificate in Clinical Health Care (Reproductive Health Option) females only
- Physiotherapy (Certificate)
- Certificate in Medical Laboratory

=== Post basic programmes ===
- Community (Medical Assistants) Kintampo
- Ophthalmic Nursing – Korle-bu
- Peri- Operative Nursing – Korle-bu
- ENT Nursing – Korle-bu
- Public Health Nursing – Korle-bu
- Critical Care Nursing – Korle-bu
- Nurse Anesthesiology – Kumasi
- Community Oral Health – Kintampo

=== Certificate programmes ===
- Certificate in Community Health Nursing ()
- Certificate in Environmental Health (Environmental Health Assistants)
- Certificate in Community Health (Field Technicians)
- Certificate in Clinical Health Care (Health Assistants)
