= Francis Fynn =

Ghanaian politician

MP for Ahanta West
- In office 7 January 1993 – 6 January 1997
- President: Jerry John Rawlings

Personal details
- Born: 13 July 1950 (age 76) Ahanta West, Western Region, Gold Coast (now Ghana)
- Party: National Democratic Congress
- Education: University of Cape Coast
- Occupation: Politician
- Profession: Teacher

Francis Fynn (born 13 July 1950) is a Ghanaian politician and a teacher. He is a member of the First Parliament of the Fourth Republic of Ghana representing the Ahanta West Constituency in the Western Region of Ghana.

== Early life and education ==
Francis Fynn was born on 13 July 1955, at Ahanta West in the Western Region of Ghana. He attended the University of Cape Coast and obtained his Bachelor of Science Education.

== Politics ==
He was first elected into Parliament on the ticket of the National Democratic Congress for the Ahanta West Constituency in the Western Region of Ghana. The 1992 Ghanaian general elections was the first elections held in the country after 11 years of military rule by Jerry John Rawlings. He served one term as a member of Parliament. He lost his seat to his opposition Samuel Kwofie of the New Patriotic Party during the 1996 Ghanaian General Elections.

== Career ==
He is a Teacher.

== Personal life ==
He is a Christian.
