= Atebubu College of Education =

Teachers training college in Ghana

- Established: October 1965
- Affiliations: Government of Ghana
- Principal: Mr. Wayo Zakariah
- Location: Atebubu, Atebubu Amanten District, BA00070, Ghana; 7.73314°N 0.99757°W
- Language: English
- Region Zone: Bono East; Bono/Ahafo/Bono East / Ashanti
- Website: http://www.atecoe.edu.gh/
- Source: An Atlas of The Forty Colleges of Education in Ghana.

Atebubu College of Education is a teacher education college in Atebubu (Atebubu Amanten District, Bono East Region, Ghana). The college is located in Ashanti / Brong Ahafo zone. It is one of the 46 Public Colleges of Education in Ghana. The college participated in the DFID-funded T-TEL programme. It was founded in October 1965. it was the premier second cycle institution and also the only teacher training college in the eastern corridor of the region.

== History ==
Atebubu College of Education was established in October 1965. Mr. Joseph Nketsia Ghansah was the first principal of the college. The Omanhene of Atebubu Traditional Area, Nana Kwaku Kwaah II, released land for the construction of permanent buildings for the College. The College was the first second cycle institution, and the only teacher training college in the eastern corridor of the then Brong-Ahafo Region, of which Bono, Bono East and Ahafo Regions were born. The College began with eighty male students. In the 1975/76 academic year, on admitting female students, the College became co-educational. It started with four-year Post Middle Teacher's Certificate ‘A’ course. Other programmes the College has gone through are 2-year Post Secondary, and 3-year Post Secondary. In September 2004, the first batch of students was admitted into the college to pursue a three-year course for Diploma in Basic education. The College was given accreditation by the National Accreditation Board (Ghana) to the tertiary level of education in September, 2007. The College now has a student population of 473, comprising 369 men and 104 women. It runs dual mode Open Distance Learning (ODL) for 587 untrained teachers, out which 219 are women. The College has over the years turned out over three thousand teachers.

Currently, the teaching staff strength is thirty-two and that of the non-teaching staff is fifty-two. Hardworking members of staff of the college have received awards from the Ghana Education Service at regional and national levels. In the year 1999, Mr. Alexander Oppong-Baah won the first position for the National Best Teacher Award (Teacher Training College Category). In the year 2000, Mr. Akolgo Atambire Emmanuel won the first position for the Second Cycle Science and Mathematics Category at the National Level. In the same year, Mr. Forson – Nkrumah I.C won the second position at the National Level for the Teacher Training College Category.

The College has distinguished herself in sports at Zonal and Regional levels. In the year 1971, Atebubu Training College was crowned the overall winner in the Zone ‘C’ of Brong Ahafo Region Inter-Schools and Colleges Sports and Games Competition held at Nkoranza Training College.The College was adjudged the best behaved institution at the competition. In the 1975 Zone ‘D’ Brong– Ahafo Schools and Colleges Sports and Games Competition held at Techiman Secondary School, the men placed second and the women were the overall winners in the Women's Division. In the year 1991, the College emerged winners in the Brong Ahafo Zonal Milo Competition. The College took the first position in the 2005 QUIZ Competition of the Teacher Trainees Association of Ghana (TTAG) Ashanti and Brong Ahafo Sector.

=== The College has been administered by six substantive principals to date. ===
Name	Years served
Mr. J. N. Ghansah	1965 – 1980
Mr. R. D. Ghettor	1980 – 1982
Mr. J. Ansah – Asarah	1983 – 1985
Mr. S.O. Okae	1985 – 1995
Mr. Tom Coffie	April 1996 – Dec. 1996
Mr. Gregory N. Bagbio	Dec. 1996 – Date
