= Ankaful Nurses Training College =

Ghanaian medical college

The Ankaful Nurses Training College is public tertiary health institution in the Ankaful in the Central Region of Ghana. The college is in the Cape Coast Metropolitan Assembly. The school is located at the Ankaful Psychiatric Hospital. The activities of the institution is supervised by the Ministry of Education. A Diploma in Nursing certificate is awarded students from the institution upon successfully completing a three-year nursing training programme. The Nurses and Midwifery Council (NMC) regulates the activities, curriculum and examination of the student nurses and midwives. The council's mandate is enshrined under section 4(1) of N.R.C.D 117. The college specializes in the training of psychiatric nurses.
