= James Ackah Cobbinah =

Ghanaian politician (born 1948)

MP for Evalue Gwira
- In office 7 January 1993 – 6 January 1997
- President: Jerry John Rawlings

Personal details
- Born: 22 September 1948 (age 77) Evalue Gwira, Western Region Gold Coast (now Ghana)
- Party: National Democratic Congress
- Education: University of Ghana
- Occupation: Politician
- Profession: Teacher

James Ackah Cobbinah (born 22 September 1948) is a Ghanaian politician and a member of the first Parliament of the fourth Republic representing the Evalue Gwira constituency in the Western Region of Ghana. He is a member of the National Democratic Congress.

== Early life and education ==
James Ackah Cobbinah was born on 22 September 1948 at Evalue Gwira in the Western Region of Ghana. He attended the University of Ghana where he obtained his Bachelor of Arts degree.

== Politics ==
He was first elected into Parliament on the Ticket of the National Democratic Congress for the Evalue Gwira Constituency in the Western Region of Ghana during the 1992 Ghanaian General Elections. He was defeated by Kojo Armah of the Convention People's Party who polled 9,791 votes out of the 100% valid votes cast representing 38.60% against his opposition James Ackah Cobbinah of the National Democratic Congress who polled 7,694 votes representing 30.30%.

== Career ==
He is a teacher by profession and a former member of Parliament for the Evalue Gwira Constituency in the Western Region of Ghana.

== Personal life ==
He is a Christian.
