= David Lamptey =

Ghanaian politician (1951–2012)

Hon. David Lamptey

Member of Parliament for Klottey-Korle Constituency
- In office 7 January 1997 – 6 January 2001

Personal details
- Born: 1951
- Died: 5 December 2012 (aged 60–61) Accra
- Party: National Democratic Congress
- Children: eight
- Occupation: Chief executive officer of sidalco group of companies and radio xyz
- Profession: Politician, businessman and philanthropist

David Lamptey was a Ghanaian businessman, philanthropist, politician and a member of parliament for the Klottey-Korley Constituency.

== Early life and education ==
Lamptey who was 61 years old as of December 2012 was a businessman, a philanthropist, politician, the owner and Chief Executive Officer (CEO) of Radio XYZ and Sidalco Group of Companies. He was the Member of Parliament (MP) for the Klottey-Korle Constituency, at Osu in the Greater Accra Region on the ticket of National Democratic Congress after decamping from the New Patriotic Party. Lamptey was credited for introducing new brands of liquid fertilizers to boost agricultural productivity in the country.

== Politics ==
Lamptey was a member of parliament of the Second Parliament of the Fourth Republic of Ghana for the Klottey-Korle Constituency in the Greater Accra Region of Ghana on the ticket of the National Democratic Congress during the 1996 Ghanaian general elections. He polled a total votes casts of 20,485 representing 26.20% during the 1996 Ghanaian Parliamentary elections over his opponents Tei Okunor an Independent Candidate who polled 17,205 votes which also represent 22.00% of the total votes cast, Gilbert K.Quartey of the New Patriotic Party also polling 17,090 votes representing 21.90% of the total votes cast, Adolf Lutterodt of the Convention People's Party polled 4,897 votes representing 6.30% of the total votes cast, Kwame Nyarko Akuffo-Mensah an independent candidate also polled 2,173 votes which represent 2.80% of the total votes cast, Buniyamin Mohamed Buniyamin of the People's National Convention had no votes cast so as Ahmed Nii Kpakpo Oti Vanderpu an Independent Candidate.

== Career ==
Lamptey was a businessman, philanthropist, a politician and chief executive officer of Sidalco group of companies and Radio XYZ.

== Personal life ==
He was married with eight children.

== Death ==
Lamptey died on 5 December 2012 and was buried on 9 February 2013.
