= Mohammed Jagri =

Ghanaian Politician

Hon. Mohammed Jagri

Member of parliament for the 4th parliament of Ghana
- In office 7 January 2005 – 6 January 2009
- President: Nana Akufo-Addo

Member of Parliament for Zabzugu-Tatale Constituency

Personal details
- Born: 12 June 1974 (age 52)
- Party: New Patriotic Party

Mohammed Jagri is a Ghanaian politician and a coordinator. He served as a member of parliament for the Zabzugu-Tatale constituency in the Northern Region.

== Early life and education ==
Mohammed Jagri was born on 12 May 1974. He obtained his certificate at the Yendi Senior High School.

== Politics ==
He is a member of the 4th parliament of the 4th republic. He took his seat in the 2004 Ghanaian general election on the ticket off the National Democratic Congress. He was elected with 16543 votes out of the total valid votes cast. This was equivalent to 50.9% of the total valid votes cast. He was elected over Jabaah John Bennam of the New Patriotic Party and Adam Kuperi Lagnaboon of the People's National Convention. These obtained 47.8% and 1.3% respectively of the total valid votes cast. The electorates in that constituency for that elections exhibited a 'skirt and blouse' voting as the presidential candidate who win for the constituency was John Kuffour from the major opposition party the New Patriotic Party.

== Personal life ==
He is a Muslim.
