= Every Ghanaian Living Everywhere =

- Chairman: Nana Yaw Boakye Ofori Atta
- General Secretary: David Arthur
- First Vice Chairman: Rahman Jamatutu
- Founder: Owuraku Amofah
- Founded: 1992
- Headquarters: Kokomlemle, Accra
- Ideology: Nkrumaism; Social democracy Democratic socialism
- Colours: Red, blue and white
- Slogan: Party of the people for the people by the people

Election symbol
- Coot landing in the colours of red, blue and white

Every Ghanaian Living Everywhere (EGLE) is an inactive political party in terms of elections in Ghana. It has not contested any elections since the 2004 Ghanaian general election. According to Ghanaian law, political parties must have a presence in all districts in order to remain registered, but due to lax enforcement, EGLE remains registered as a party as of 2019.

== Electoral performance ==
In the 7 December 2004 general elections, EGLE was part of the Grand Coalition which won 4 out of 230 seats. Edward Mahama, the Grand Coalition candidate, won 1.9% of the vote in the presidential elections.

=== 1992 elections ===
EGLE, led by Owuraku Amofa, contested the 1992 presidential election in an alliance with the National Democratic Congress (NDC) led by Jerry Rawlings. The Progressive Alliance, as it was called, put forward a single candidate for president, Rawlings, and a single vice presidential candidate, Kow Nkensen Arkaah, on 3 November 1992. They won 58.4% of the popular vote and became the first president and vice president of the Fourth Republic of Ghana.

In the 29 December 1992 parliamentary election, EGLE won 1 out of 200 constituencies, becoming the third-largest party in parliament.

=== 2020 elections ===
The party did not field any parliamentary nor presidential candidates for the 2020 Ghanaian general election due to financial constraints. It decided to back John Mahama of the National Democratic Congress instead for president. In November 2020, the Every Ghanaian Living Everywhere (EGLE) Party announced that it would not field candidates for the presidential and parliamentary elections due to financial constraints. After thorough consultations with the party founder, grassroots members, and the National Executive Committee, EGLE decided to mobilize its efforts toward supporting the National Democratic Congress (NDC) and its presidential candidate, John Dramani Mahama. The party highlighted that many of the issues it aimed to address coincided with the agenda set forth in the NDC's manifesto.

=== Parliamentary elections ===
Election	Number of EGLE votes	Share of votes	Seats	+/-	Position	Outcome of election
2004	16,097	0.18%	0 / 230	Steady	5th of 8	Not represented in parliament
2000	730	0.01%	0 / 200	Steady	7th of 7	Not represented in parliament
1996	7,315	0.1%	0 / 200	▼1	7th of 8	Not represented in parliament
1992	10,098	0.5%	1 / 200	—	3rd of 3	Formed majority government alliance

=== Presidential elections ===
Election	Candidate	Number of votes	Share of votes	Outcome of election
1992	Jerry Rawlings (Progressive Alliance)*	2,323,135	58.4%	Elected ✓
