= National Convention Party (Ghana) =

- Abbreviation: NCP
- Leader: Kow Nkensen Arkaah
- Founded: 1992
- Dissolved: 29 January 1996
- Merger of: National Convention Party with People's Convention Party
- Merged into: Convention People's Party
- Ideology: Nkrumaism; Progressivism

The National Convention Party (NCP) is a political party in Ghana that existed between 1992 and January 1996.

== Formation and Progressive Alliance ==
The party was formed in 1992 after the ban on political parties was lifted by the military Provisional National Defence Council (PNDC) government. Its first leader was Kow Nkensen Arkaah. Kojo Tsikata is reported to have been instrumental in getting the Kwame Nkrumah Youngsters Club and the Kwame Nkrumah Welfare Society to merge to form the National Convention Party. He was the patron of both clubs. He was also instrumental along with P. V. Obeng and Ebo Tawiah in forming the electoral alliance between the NCP and the National Democratic Congress (NDC).

== Electoral performance ==
=== 1992 elections ===
The NCP contested the 1992 presidential election in an alliance with the National Democratic Congress (NDC) led by Jerry Rawlings and Every Ghanaian Living Everywhere (EGLE) led by Owuraku Amofa. The alliance put forward a single candidate for president, Jerry Rawlings and a single vice president candidate, Ekow Arkaah on November 3, 1992. They won 58.4% of the popular vote and became the first President and Vice President of the Fourth Republic of Ghana.

In the 29 December 1992 Parliamentary election, the NCP won 8 out of 200 constituencies, becoming the second largest party in parliament.

=== Parliamentary elections ===
Election	Number of NCP votes	Share of votes	Seats	+/-	Position	Outcome of election
1996	65,540	0.9%	0	▼8	5th of 8	
1992	377,673	19.2%	8	—	2nd of 3	Formed majority government alliance

=== Presidential elections ===
Election	Candidate	Number of votes	Share of votes	Outcome of election
1992	Jerry Rawlings (Progressive Alliance)*	2,323,135	58.4%	Elected ✓

== Merger ==
The "Nkrumahist" parties decided to merge before contesting the 1996 elections. The People's Convention Party (PCP) and the NCP then announced the formation of the Convention People's Party on 29 January 1996. This signaled the end of the NCP as a standalone party.
