= 1996 Ghanaian general election =

← 1992	7 December 1996	2000 →
- Presidential election
- Turnout: 78.31%
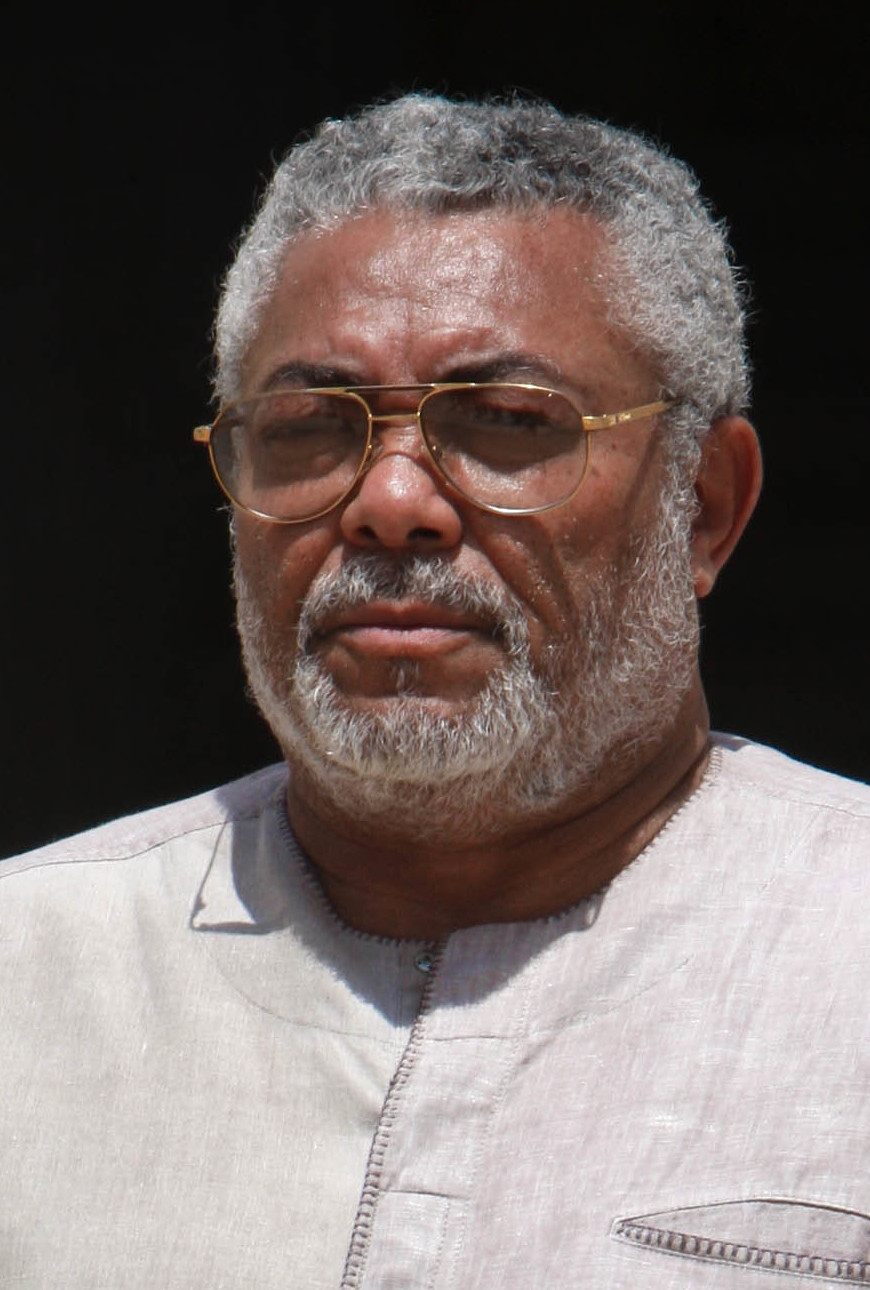

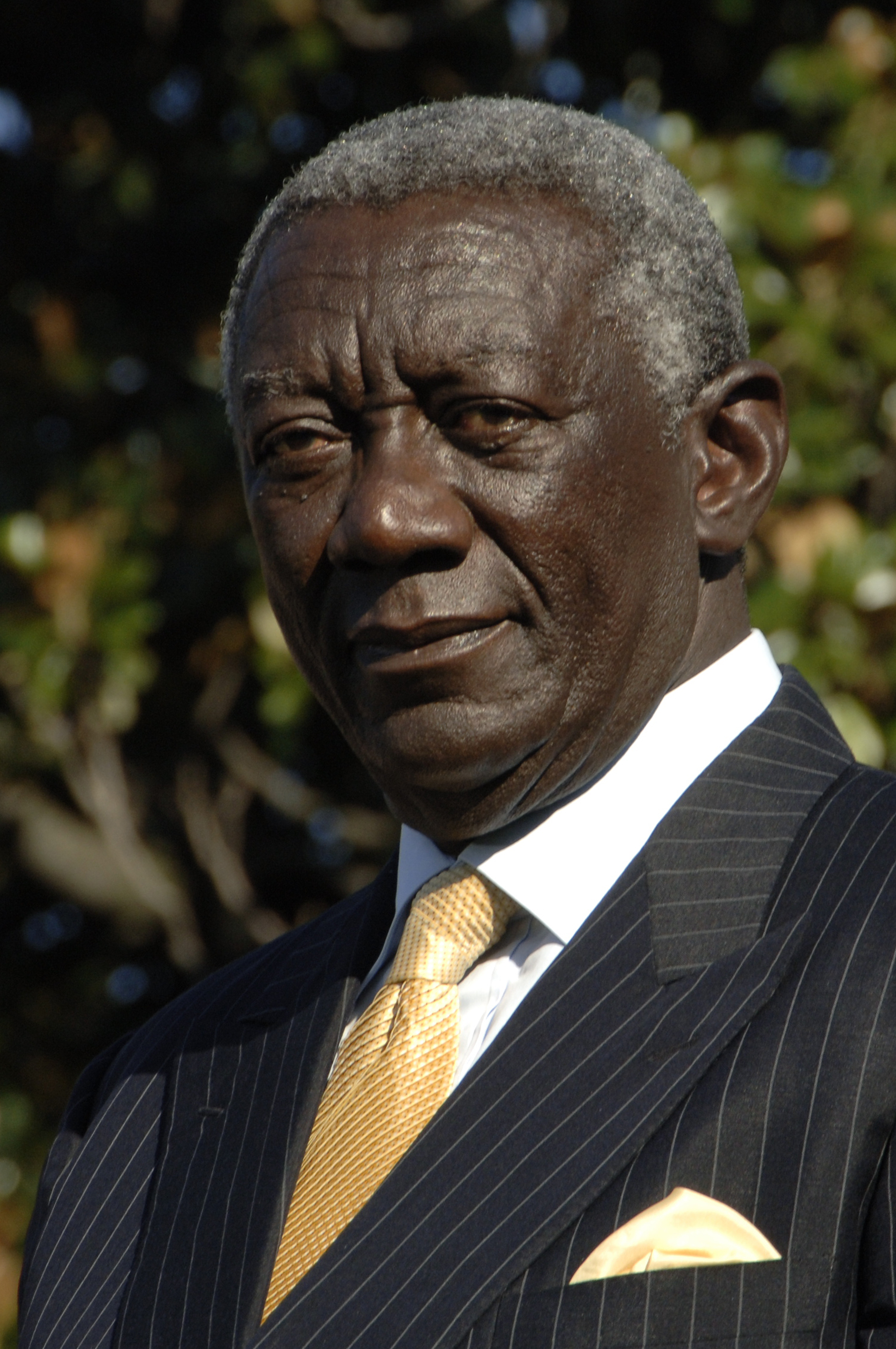
Nominee	Jerry Rawlings	John Kufuor
Party	NDC	NPP
Alliance	Progressive Alliance (NDC–EGLE–DPP)	Great Alliance (NPP–NCP)
Popular vote	4,099,758	2,834,878
Percentage	57.37%	39.67%
- Results by region
President before election
Jerry Rawlings
NDC
Elected President
Jerry Rawlings
NDC

General elections were held in Ghana on 7 December 1996. In the presidential elections, incumbent Jerry Rawlings of the National Democratic Congress (NDC) was re-elected in a single round, defeating John Kufuor of the Great Alliance (led by Kufuor's New Patriotic Party) with 57% of the vote. The NDC retained its majority in Parliament, winning 133 of the 200 seats.

In contrast to the 1992 general elections, these elections were not mired in controversy. In the aftermath of the contentious 1992 elections, several electoral reforms were made with the intent to increase the perceived fairness of the electoral process and put in place measures to prevent fraud.

== Results ==
=== President ===
Candidate	Running mate	Party	Votes	%
Jerry Rawlings	John Atta Mills	Progressive Alliance (NDC–EGLE–DPP)	4,099,758	57.37
John Kufuor	Kow Nkensen Arkaah	Great Alliance (NPP–NCP)	2,834,878	39.67
Edward Mahama	–	People's National Convention	211,136	2.95
Total			7,145,772	100.00
Valid votes			7,145,772	98.34
Invalid/blank votes			120,921	1.66
Total votes			7,266,693	100.00
Registered voters/turnout			9,279,605	78.31
Source: Nohlen et al.

=== Parliament ===
Party	Votes	%	Seats	+/–
National Democratic Congress	3,755,801	52.52	133	–56
New Patriotic Party	2,372,330	33.17	61	New
People's Convention Party	466,113	6.52	5	New
People's National Convention	254,062	3.55	1	New
National Convention Party	65,856	0.92	0	–8
Democratic People's Party	12,032	0.17	0	New
Every Ghanaian Living Everywhere	8,665	0.12	0	–1
Great Consolidated Popular Party	1,485	0.02	0	New
Independents	215,326	3.01	0	–2
Total	7,151,670	100.00	200	0
Valid votes	7,156,505	98.89		
Invalid/blank votes	79,970	1.11		
Total votes	7,236,475	100.00		
Registered voters/turnout	9,279,605	77.98		
Source: Electoral Commission

== See also ==
- List of MPs elected in the 1996 Ghanaian parliamentary election
