= 1992 Ghanaian parliamentary election =

- 29 December 1992

All 200 seats in Parliament 101 seats needed for a majority
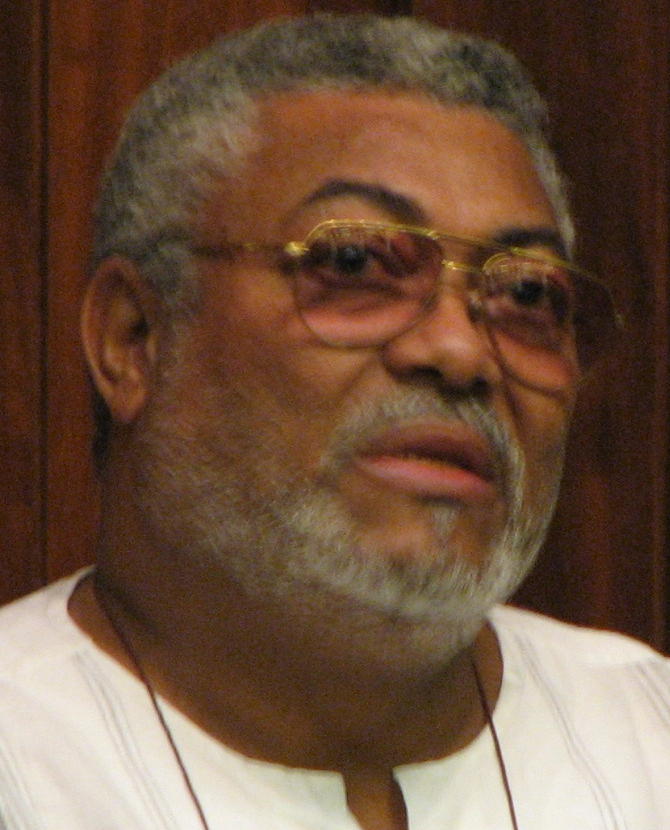
	First party	Second party
		NCP
Leader	Jerry Rawlings	Kow Nkensen Arkaah
Party	NDC	NCP
Seats won	189	8
Popular vote	1,521,629	377,673
Percentage	77.53%	19.24%

Parliamentary elections were held in Ghana on 29 December 1992, the first since 1979. Voter turnout was just 28.1% amidst a boycott by opposition parties, who had claimed the preceding presidential elections in November – won by former military ruler Jerry Rawlings with 58% of the vote – were fraudulent, with international observers considering them not to have been conducted in a free and fair manner.

The result was a victory for Rawlings's National Democratic Congress, which won 189 of the 200 seats.

== Results ==
A total of 8,229,902 voters were registered, but 893,056 were in the 23 constituencies that were uncontested.

Party	Votes	%	Seats
National Democratic Congress	1,521,629	77.53	189
National Convention Party	377,673	19.24	8
Every Ghanaian Living Everywhere	10,098	0.51	1
Independents	53,143	2.71	2
Total	1,962,543	100.00	200
Registered voters/turnout	7,336,846	–	
Source: African Elections Database

=== By region ===
Party	Ashanti	Brong Ahafo	Central	Eastern	Greater Accra	Northern	Upper East	Upper West	Volta	Western	Total Seats
National Democratic Congress	33	20	16	20	22	23	11	8	18	16	189
National Convention Party	0	0	1	3	0	0	0	0	1	3	8
Every Ghanaian Living Everywhere	0	0	0	1	0	0	0	0	0	0	1
Independents	0	1	0	0	0	0	1	0	0	0	2
National Total	33	21	17	24	22	23	12	8	19	19	200
Source: Nohlen et al.

== See also ==
- List of Ghana Parliament constituencies
- List of MPs elected in the 1992 Ghanaian parliamentary election

== External links and sources ==
- Elected Parliamentarians - 1992 Elections, Electoral Commission of Ghana, Archived from original on 12 January 2011
