= Kadjebi-Asato Senior High School =

Second-cycle institution in Oti Region, Ghana

Location
- Kadjebi, Oti Region; Kadjebi; Ghana; 7.53792°N 0.46199°E

Information
- Type: Public secondary/high school
- Motto: Consilio et Animis (Wisdom and Courage)
- Religious affiliation: Inter-denominational
- Established: 5 September 1959; 67 years ago
- School district: Kadjebi District
- Headmaster: Rev Fr Daniel K. Lenwah (SVD
- Gender: Mix
- Age: 14 to 18
- Houses: 6
- Slogan: Konsu Sakyi ... Nyansapor!
- Song: Kasec Anthem
- Nickname: Proudly Kasecan
- Alumni: KASEC Old Student's Union (KOSU)
- Website: www.kaseconline.org/index.html

Kadjebi-Asato Senior High School (KASEC) is a co-educational, boarding senior high school located on the border of two towns known as Kadjebi and Asato, which give the school its name. It is located in the Kadjebi District in the Oti Region of Ghana.

== Crest ==
The school crest is a combination of a book and an eagle, with a wisdom knot and the motto Consilio et Animis ("By Wisdom and Courage").

== History ==
The school is one of the trust schools established by Dr. Kwame Nkrumah on 5 September 1959 with the aim of providing second cycle education to children within the catchment area and beyond. It was established under the Ghana Education Trust Fund and funded by the Ghana Cocoa Board. The foundation stone was laid by Ferdinand Goka, the then Volta regional commissioner. The first classes began on 19 January 1960 for 66 boys.

The school celebrated its 60th anniversary in November 2019. The old Students Union - the Kasec Old Students Union (KOSU) - started in the early 1990s in the New York and New Jersey areas of the United States. During this period, initial members met informally at members’ residences to discuss matters of mutual interest and benefit and examine ways to offer support to their alma mater. In February 2009, a few alumni, located in the New York area, gathered together via telephone conferencing to rebuild the KOSU-Global organization.

== Headmasters ==
Ordinal	Name	Term start	Term end
1	A. D. Addo Yobo	1960	1965
2	S. K. Afari	1965	1972
3	J. B. Yegbe		AG
4	H. K. Owusu	1973	1981
5	E. K. Gawu	1981	1984
6	E. K. Kokorokoi	1984	1986
7	I. K. Cudjoe	1986	1996
8	Mr F.K Korwu	1996	2003
9	Mussah Yamba Issahaku	2003	2009
10	Thomas Fourdjour-Ababio	2009	2017
11	Gideon Tay	2017	2020
12	Daniel K. Lenwah (SVD)	2020	Incumbent

== Campus ==
Halls of residence are divided into six, each named after people who have contributed in diverse ways towards the progress of the school.

Akompi House was named after the late Nana Akompi Finam I, Omanhene of Kadjebi-Akan Traditional Area to recognize and appreciate the pioneering role he played in bringing the school to this location.

Konsu House Konsu is a stream between the school and Asato which empties itself into the Dai River and serves as a source of water to the school.

Addo-Yobo House was named in recognition of the dedicated service the first headmaster, Mr. Addo Yobo rendered.

Bonsu House was named after the late Nana Osei Bonsu III of Asato Traditional Area to recognize and appreciate the pioneering role he played in bringing the school to this location.

== Curriculum ==
The school provides a broad curriculum, including English, mathematics and sciences (either as integrated science or as separate disciplines of biology, chemistry and physics). In addition, the general arts curriculum offers courses in Christian religious studies, economics, English literature, geography, government, history and music. Language teaching includes French, Twi and Ewe.

- General Arts
- General Science
- Home Economics
- Visual Arts
- General Agriculture

== Extracurricular activities ==
The school has a long-standing cadet, male soccer team, female soccer team, basketball team, handball, volleyball team and hockey team. All of these have won medals from school competitions up to the Zonal levels. The school is known for its athletes' performance.

The school band trains students in their leisure time on how to play instruments such as the trumpet, drums, and trombone.

== Notable alumni ==
- Rashid Bawa, former member of parliament and currently Ghana's Ambassador to Nigeria
- John Kwadwo Gyapong, Ghanaian politician
- Clemence Jackson Honyenuga, Justice of the Supreme Court of Ghana (2020–2023) and Paramount Chief of Nyagbo Traditional Area
- Joseph Kwadwo Ofori, Ghanaian politician
