= Ahamansu Islamic Senior High School =

Public school in Ghana

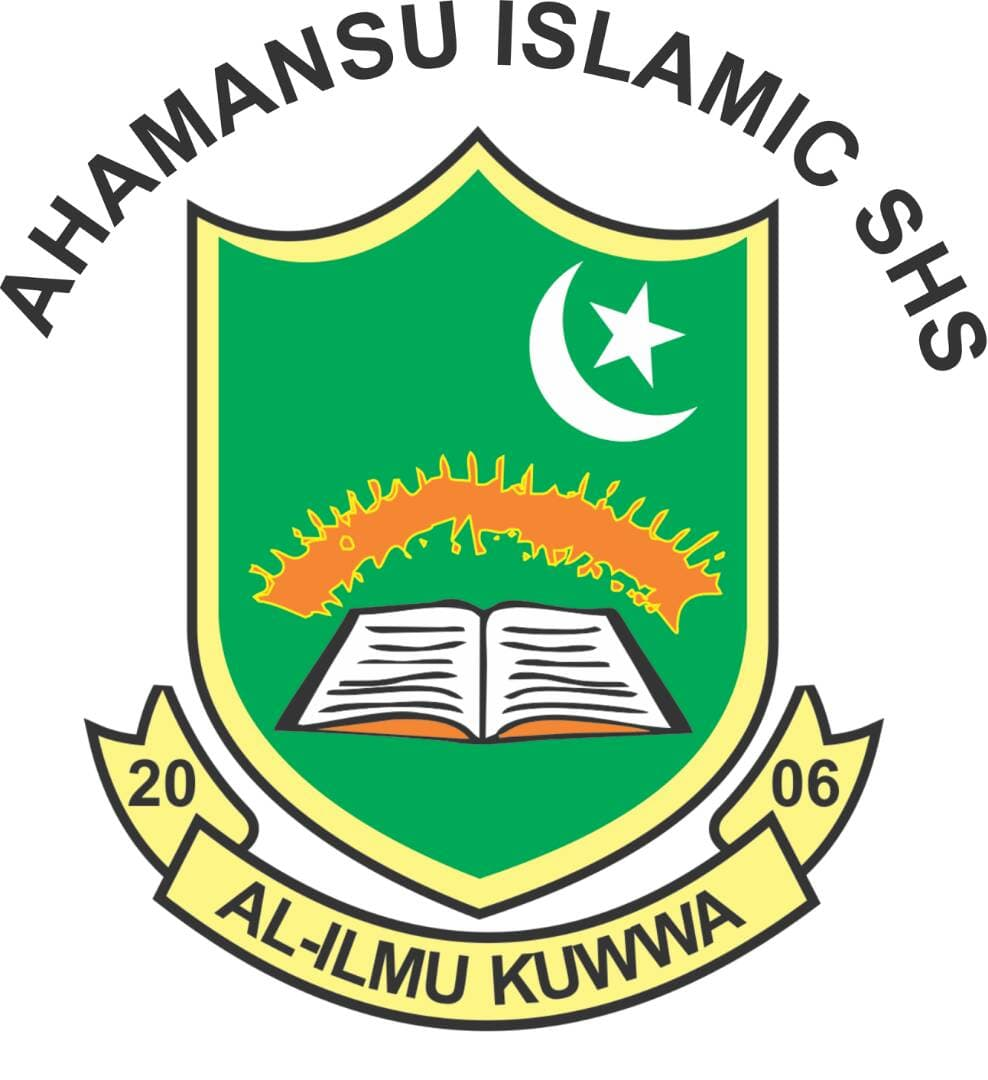
- Ahamansu Islamic Senior High School new logo

Location
- P. O. Box 30, Kadjebi; Ahamansu; Oti Region; Ghana; 7.7333219°N 0.550393°E

Information
- School type: Public High School, Boarding & Day
- Motto: Al-Ilmu Kuwwa (Knowledge is Power)
- Founded: 8 September 2006 (19 years ago)
- Status: Active: Absorbed into Public School System in 2012
- School district: Kadjebi District
- Authority: Ministry of Education (Ghana)
- Oversight: Ghana Education Service
- Head of school: Mr. Soulemana Moru
- Grades: Forms 1–3 (10th – 12th grades)
- Gender: Co-educational
- Age: 14 to 20
- Language: English
- Nickname: AHISHS
- Affiliation: West African Examinations Council

Ahamansu Islamic Senior High School is a public co-educational high school located in Ahamansu, Ghana. It was the first Islamic senior high school in the Volta Region and one of three second cycle institutions in the Kadjebi District which became part of the Oti Region in 2019.

== History ==
Ahamansu Islamic Senior High School started as private high school in 2006 by the Zongo community with funds from donor organisations. The Ahamansu Traditional Council offered large parcels of land to be used as campus for its establishment.

Eric Osei was the first headmaster of the school from 2006 to 2010. In 2010 Godfried Nyarko replaced Osei as headmaster. Nyarko advised for the necessary measures to be taken to ease the financial burdens of the school and to curtail the school's over-reliance on the National Service Scheme for teachers.

Nyarko initiated the requisite processes with the help of staff and National Service Personnel, which eventually culminated in the absorption of the school into the public system. In 2011, officers from the Ghana Education Service Headquarters inspected the schools facilities and recommended its absorption. The school became public in the year 2012. Charlotte Agboga took over from Nyarko and became the headmistress of the school.

== Academics ==
Ahamansu Islamic Senior High School follows the West African Examinations Council and the secondary cycle of the Ghana Education Service curriculum. Students are required to take four core subjects and three or four specialised elective subjects under the various programmes throughout the duration of study.

=== Core subjects ===
- English
- Core mathematics
- Integrated science
- Social studies

=== Electives ===
Students choose three or four electives from the following:

- Business studies
- General arts
- Agricultural science
- Home economics
- Visual arts

At the end of their studies, students sit the West African Senior School Certificate Examination, which qualifies them for further studies in tertiary institutions.

== Extracurricular and co-curricular activities ==
- Physical education
- Sports
- Basic Arabic education

== Head of school ==
Name	Tenure
Eric Osei	2006–2010
Godfried Nyarko	2010–2013
Mrs. Charlotte Agboga	2013–2017
Grace Lorlor Abla Bonuedi (acting)	2017 – December 2018
Soulemana Moru	December 2018 – current

== See also ==
- List of Senior High Schools in Ghana
- Education in Ghana
- Islamic Studies
- Islam in Ghana
