= Dodi Papase =

Coordinates: 7°44′N 0°30′E

- Interactive map of Dodi Papase
- Country: Ghana
- Region: Oti
- District: Kadjebi District

Population
  - Total: 5,254
- Time zone: UTC

Dodi Papase is a town in the Oti Region of Ghana. With a population of approximately 5,254, Dodi Papase is the second-most-populous city in Kadjebi District in the Oti Region of Ghana. It is located in Eastern Ghana on the banks of the Wawa River and is known for the Dodi Papase Community Secondary School, a second cycle institution (senior high school).

== Background ==
Dodi Papase is located in the Kadjebi district of Ghana's Oti Region. The road network from Kadjebi to Papase is well-functioning except for a section from Ahamansu Junction to Papase township.

Vegetation is rich and the town's inhabitants are predominantly cocoa farmers. The community is composed of Christians, Muslims, and traditionalists.

=== Education ===
The town has four public basic schools and one private basic school. The Dodi Papase Community Secondary School is one of two second-cycle schools in Kadjebi District. It teaches and houses students from various parts of the country. Students have performed well in the West African Senior School Certificate Examination.

=== Health care ===
The Saint Mary Theresa Hospital is located in the town along Papase–Amanfrom Road. It features a medical laboratory, dental and eye clinics, and departments for outpatients, obstetrics, gynaecology and paediatrics. On Tuesdays and Thursdays, the hospital area hosts a market (referred to as the 'Dzimpapa' market) where the locals sell foods such as plantains, cassava, bananas, coconuts, and oranges.

=== Tourism ===
The Wawa River is a recreational place for the people of Papase. Occasionally, young people organize recreational activities on its banks, which are locally referred to as "Wawa Beach". Tourist attractions include the Nyonku No. 1 Stone Pillar, which is 3 km (1.9 mi) northeast of Dodi Papase, and the Bakpa Stone cave, which is about 6.5 km (4.0 mi) west of Papase.

=== Telecommunications ===
Two telecommunication network providers currently operate in the town: MTN and Vodafone Ghana
