= Akan (Ghana parliament constituency) =

Ghana parliament constituency

- constituency for the Parliament of Ghana
- District: Kadjebi District
- Region: Oti Region of Ghana

Current constituency
- Party: National Democratic Congress
- MP: Yao Gomado

The Akan constituency is one of the constituencies represented in the Parliament of Ghana. It elects one Member of Parliament (MP) by the first past the post system of election. It is located in the Kadjebi district of the Oti Region of Ghana.

== Boundaries ==
The constituency is located within the Kadjebi district of the Oti Region of Ghana. To the north is the Nkwanta South constituency in the Nkwanta District, to the west, the Krachi East in the Krachi East District, to the south the Jasikan District and to the east, the Ghana - Togo border. The constituency was originally located within the Volta Region of Ghana until new Regions were created following the December 2018 referendum.

== Members of Parliament ==
First elected	Member	Party
1969	Stephen Kwadwo Osei-Nyame	National Alliance of Liberals
1979	Kojo Obed Amoako-Prempeh	People's National Party
1992	Seth Kwabena Akompi	National Convention Party
1996	John Kwadwo Gyapong	National Democratic Congress
2000	Rashid Bawa	Independent
2004	John Kwadwo Gyapong	National Democratic Congress
2008	Joseph Kwadwo Ofori	National Democratic Congress
2012	Joseph Kwadwo Ofori	Independent
2016	Abdul Aziz Amuniru	National Democratic Congress
2020	Yao Gomado	National Democratic Congress

== Elections ==
2016 Ghanaian general election: Akan Sources:GhanaWeb
Party	Candidate	Votes	%	±%
National Democratic Congress	Abdul Aziz Amuniru	13,941	51.05	+15.42
New Patriotic Party	Kofi Adjei Ntim	9,730	35.63	+14.49
Independent	Joseph Kwadwo Ofori	3,486	12.77	−18.14
Independent	Jonathan Tetteh	149	0.55	—
Majority		10,455		
Turnout		27,306		

2012 Ghanaian general election: Akan Sources:GhanaWeb
Party	Candidate	Votes	%	±%
Independent	Joseph Kwadwo Ofori	9,199	30.91	−27.69
National Democratic Congress	John Kwadwo Gyapong	8,396	28.21	−30.39
New Patriotic Party	Harry Afrim-Darko	6,293	21.14	−12.96
Independent	Ahmed Miniru	3,182	10.69	+2.61
Independent	Emmanuel Kofi Edzeame	1,223	4.11	
People's National Convention	Maxwell Gyambiby-Asong	127	3.79	+2.69
Convention People's Party	Rashid Alao	207	0.7	0.2
Independent	Solomon Okoree Kwadjo	135	0.45	+0.05
Majority		803		
Turnout		29,762		

2008 Ghanaian parliamentary election: Akan Sources:Electoral Commission of Ghana
Party	Candidate	Votes	%	±%
National Democratic Congress	Joseph Kwadwo Ofori	13,730	58.6	+2.7
New Patriotic Party	Kofi Adjei Ntim	7,989	34.1	−6.0
Independent	George Harrison	791	3.4	—
Independent	Ahmed Miniru	362	1.5	—
People's National Convention	Maxwel Gyambiby Ansong	263	1.1	−1.2
Convention People's Party	Rashid Alao	121	0.5	−1.2
Democratic Freedom Party	Justice Nkani	97	0.4	—
Independent	Solomon Okoree	85	0.4	—
Majority		5,741	24.5	+8.7
Turnout		23,863	64.1	−24.4

2004 Ghanaian parliamentary election: Akan Source:National Electoral Commission, Ghana
Party	Candidate	Votes	%	±%
National Democratic Congress	John Kwadwo Gyapong	13,716	55.9	1.0
New Patriotic Party	Rashid Bawa	9,843	40.1	37.7
People's National Convention	Maxwel Gyambiby Ansong	565	2.3	—
Convention People's Party	Pastor Gidson G. Akromah	425	1.7	0.8
Majority		3,873	15.8	2.8
Turnout		25,340	88.5	—

2000 Ghanaian parliamentary election: Akan Source:Adam Carr's Election Archives
Party	Candidate	Votes	%	±%
Independent	Rashid Bawa	12,306	54.9	+54.1
National Democratic Congress	John Kwadwo Gyapong	9,386	41.9	−21.5
New Patriotic Party	Kofi Asiedu-Mensah	536	2.4	—
Convention People's Party	Gibson-Godfried Akromah	196	0.9	—
Majority		2,920	13.0	−30.8

1996 Ghanaian parliamentary election: Akan Source:Electoral Commission of Ghana
Party	Candidate	Votes	%	±%
National Democratic Congress	John Kwadwo Gyapong	16,008	63.4	—
Independent	Fudu Kassim	4,942	19.6	—
People's Convention Party	James Yaw Fato	3,875	15.4	—
Independent	Seth Frank Alifui	213	0.8	—
National Convention Party	Joseph Yaw Baidoo	196	0.7	—
Majority		11,006	43.8	—

1992 Ghanaian parliamentary election: Akan Source:Electoral Commission of Ghana
Party	Candidate	Votes	%	±%
National Convention Party	Seth Kwabena Akompi			—
Majority				—
Turnout		13,286	46.3	—

== See also ==
- List of Ghana Parliament constituencies
