= Daniel Machator =

Ghanaian politician and journalist

Oti Regional Minister
- In office February 2024 – 6 January 2025
- President: Nana Akufo-Addo
- Preceded by: Joshua Makubu
- Succeeded by: John Kwadwo Gyapong

Personal details
- Party: New Patriotic Party
- Education: University of Ghana, University of Cape Coast
- Profession: Journalist

Daniel Machator is a Ghanaian journalist and politician. He is a former minister for Oti Region. He served in the New Patriotic Party government of Nana Akufo-Addo between 2024 and 2025.

== Early life and education ==
Machator hails from Bonakye in the Nkwanta South Municipal District of the Oti Region. He studied History and Linguistics at the University of Ghana at Legon where he graduated with the Bachelor of Arts degree. He went on to the University of Cape Coast where he obtained the Master of Arts in Communication.

== Professional career ==
Machator worked with Theovision International as the radio station manager for Radio Gaakii in Saboba in the Northern Region of Ghana. He published many articles online with various media houses.

Machator later joined the Ghana Prisons Service, where he served as the Central regional public relations officer. He later rose to become the deputy director of public affairs of the service. Prior to his appointment to political office, he was the head of public affairs at the Ghana Institute of Journalism, now the University of Media, Arts and Communication.

== Politics ==
In February 2024, following a cabinet reshuffle by President Akufo-Addo, he replaced Joshua Makubu as the Regional Minister for the Oti Region. He continued in this position until the end of the government's tenure on 6 January 2025.

Political offices
Preceded by Joshua Makubu	Oti Regional Minister; 2024 – 2025	Succeeded by John Kwadwo Gyapong
