= John Kwadwo Gyapong =

Ghanaian politician

Oti Regional Minister
- Incumbent
- Assumed office 30 January 2025
- President: John Mahama
- Preceded by: Daniel Machator

MP for Akan
- In office 7 January 2005 – 6 January 2009
- President: John Kufour
- Preceded by: Rashid Bawa
- Succeeded by: Joseph Kwadwo Ofori

MP for Akan
- In office 7 January 1997 – 6 January 2001
- President: Jerry John Rawlings
- Preceded by: Seth Kwabena Akompi
- Succeeded by: Rashid Bawa

Personal details
- Born: 22 December 1950 (age 75)
- Party: National Democratic Congress
- Education: University of Cape Coast
- Occupation: Politician, Chairman
- Profession: Executive Director, Farmer; Teacher

John Kwadwo Gyampong (born 22 December 1950) is a Ghanaian politician and executive director. He served as a member of the 2nd parliament and was taken over by Rashid Bawa. He later returned to serve as an MP of the 4th parliament of the 4th republic of Ghana for the Akan Constituency in the Volta Region. He represented the National Democratic Congress. He is the current Regional Minister for the Oti Region and was sworn into office on 30 January 2025 after his appointment by President John Dramani Mahama.

== Early life and education ==
Gyampong was born on 22 December 1950. He attended the Kadjebi-Asato Secondary School and obtained his GCE Ordinary Level and the Kpando Secondary School where he obtained his GCE Advanced Level. He obtained a Bachelor of Science in Education at the University of Cape Coast.

== Career ==
Kwadjo Gyampong is an executive director apart from being a politician, who represented the Akan Constituency in the second and fourth Parliament in the Volta Region of Ghana. He was also the Volta Regional Chairman of the National Democratic Congress (NDC) and currently the Oti Regional Chairman. He is a Teacher and also a Farmer.

== Politics ==
Gyampong is a member of the National Democratic Congress party. His political career as an MP begun in 1996 when he was voted into power to replace Seth Kwabena Akompi of the National Democratic Congress. He won the seat with 16,008 out of the 25,165 valid votes cast representing 73.40% over his opponents Fudu Kassim who polled 4,942 representing 14.80%, James Yaw Fato who polled 3,875 votes representing 11.605, seth Frank Alifui who polled 213 votes representing 0.60% and Joseph Yaw Biadoo who polled 127 votes representing 0.40%. However, he was also taken over by Rashid Bawa an Independent in the 2000 Ghanaian general elections by obtaining 12,306 votes which represented 54.90% of the share. He won the Akan seat again during the Ghana's 2004 general election with 13,716 votes out of the 24,917 valid votes cast, gaining 55.9% share out of 100%. He took the Seat from Bawa Rashid, a New Patriotic Party candidate. In 2008, Joseph Kwadwo Ofori instead of Gyampong represented the National Democratic Congress in the elections and won the Akan seat.

In 2019, he transitioned from his role as the Volta Regional Chairman of the National Democratic Congress to become the first Regional Chairman of the newly created Oti Region, where he secured most of his votes from.

In 2020, he said: “Peace is a major factor in any political organization, it is a factor in the development of any country we need everyone to be peaceful.

“Nobody should come and convince anyone to create confusion to disrupt the elections.”

The Oti Regional Chairman stressed his desire for peace heading towards the 2020 general elections and urged Ghanaians to vote for peace.
