= Michael Kofi Bansah =

Michael Kofi Bansah is a Ghanaian security expert and a former Director General of the Ghana Prisons Service.

== Director General of Ghana Prisons Service ==
In March 2010, the then President of Ghana, John Atta Mills, upon the advice of the Prisons Service Council, appointed her as Acting Director General of the Ghana Prisons Service. He retired in March 2013 and was replaced by Matilda Baffour Awuah.
