= Benjamin Kofi Quashie =

Ghanaian politician

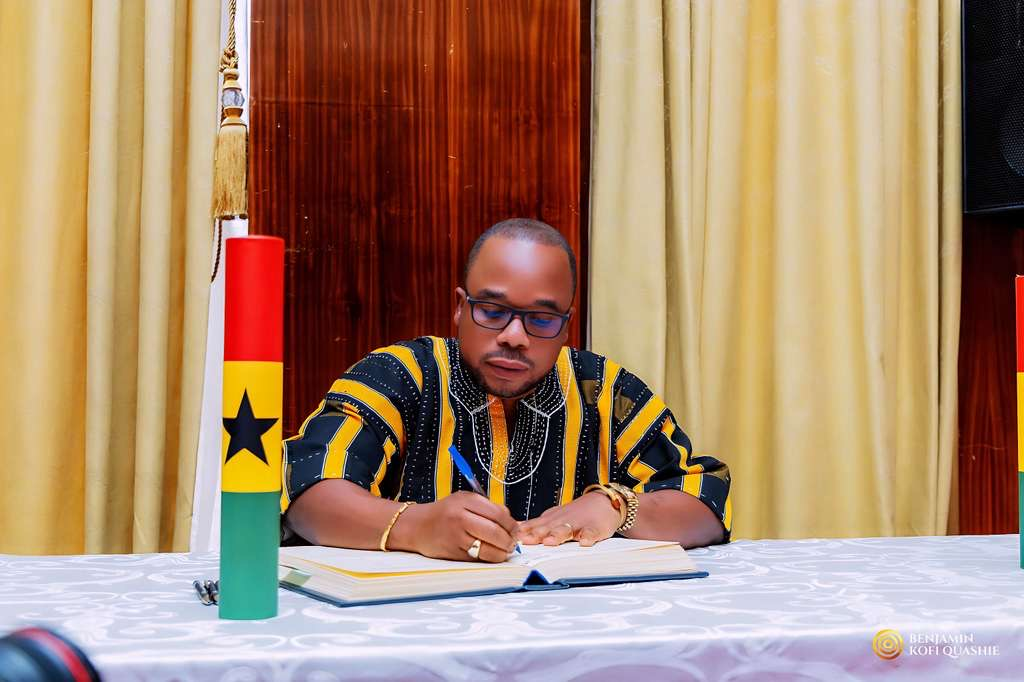
- Quashie signing to assume duty as Ghana's High Commissioner to South Africa

Personal details
- Born: May 1, 1982 (43 years)
- Party: NDC
- Education: Robert Kennedy College, University of Cumbria, London School of Economics and Political Science, Havard Business School, Online, Kpando Senior High School
- Profession: Politician, Diplomat, Business consultant, Philanthropist

Benjamin Kofi Quashie (born 1 May 1982) is Ghana's High Commissioner to South Africa. He was appointed and commissioned by President John Dramani Mahama on 2 October 2025. With his appointment, Benjamin has concurrent accreditation to Eswatini, Mauritius, Mozambique, Lesotho, and Seychelles.

== Family life ==
Ben is the last of four siblings.

== Politics ==
Benjamin served as the Council of Elders chair of the Ghanaian National Democratic Congress in South Africa. While the NDC was in opposition, he was a strong critic of the New Patriotic Party government led by President Nana Akufo-Addo, and following the NDC victory in the 2024 Ghanaian general election he has been a firm believer in the John Mahama administration. He has been particular about the previous government's fight against illegal mining, popularly known in Ghana as galamsey, which he has often described as a failed attempt. Benjamin believes that the current president has the fight against galamsey at heart and will do everything in his power to stop the canker.

In June 2025, he was appointed by President John Dramani Mahama as Ghana's High Commissioner to South Africa and later commissioned in October. Benjamin's appointment as High Commissioner to South Africa at age 43 is seen by many as the dawn of a new era in Ghanaian politics, with some describing it as a deliberate effort by President Mahama to introduce youthful personalities into Ghana's diplomatic missions.

== Philanthropy and business ==
Benjamin is the founder and executive chairman of the BKQ Foundation, which provides relief services to persons living in deprived communities in Ghana. Through the BKQ Foundation, Benjamin has embarked on several projects aimed at ameliorating the sufferings of deprived persons and communities in Ghana. These include, but not limited to, the Demonstration School for the Deaf at Mampong. The foundation also donated an electric wheel chair to Wonder Ahialome, a young boy who was born disabled and had to walk several kilometers to school with the aid of crutches.

He is also group chairman for Allied Consortiums.

== Education ==
He earned an MBA from the University of Cumbria's Robert Kennedy College and a Bachelor of Science degree from Harvard Business School in Boston, Massachusetts. He also studied at the London School of Economics.
