= Yao Gomado =

Ghanaian politician and electrical engineer

Hon. Ing. Yao Gomado MP
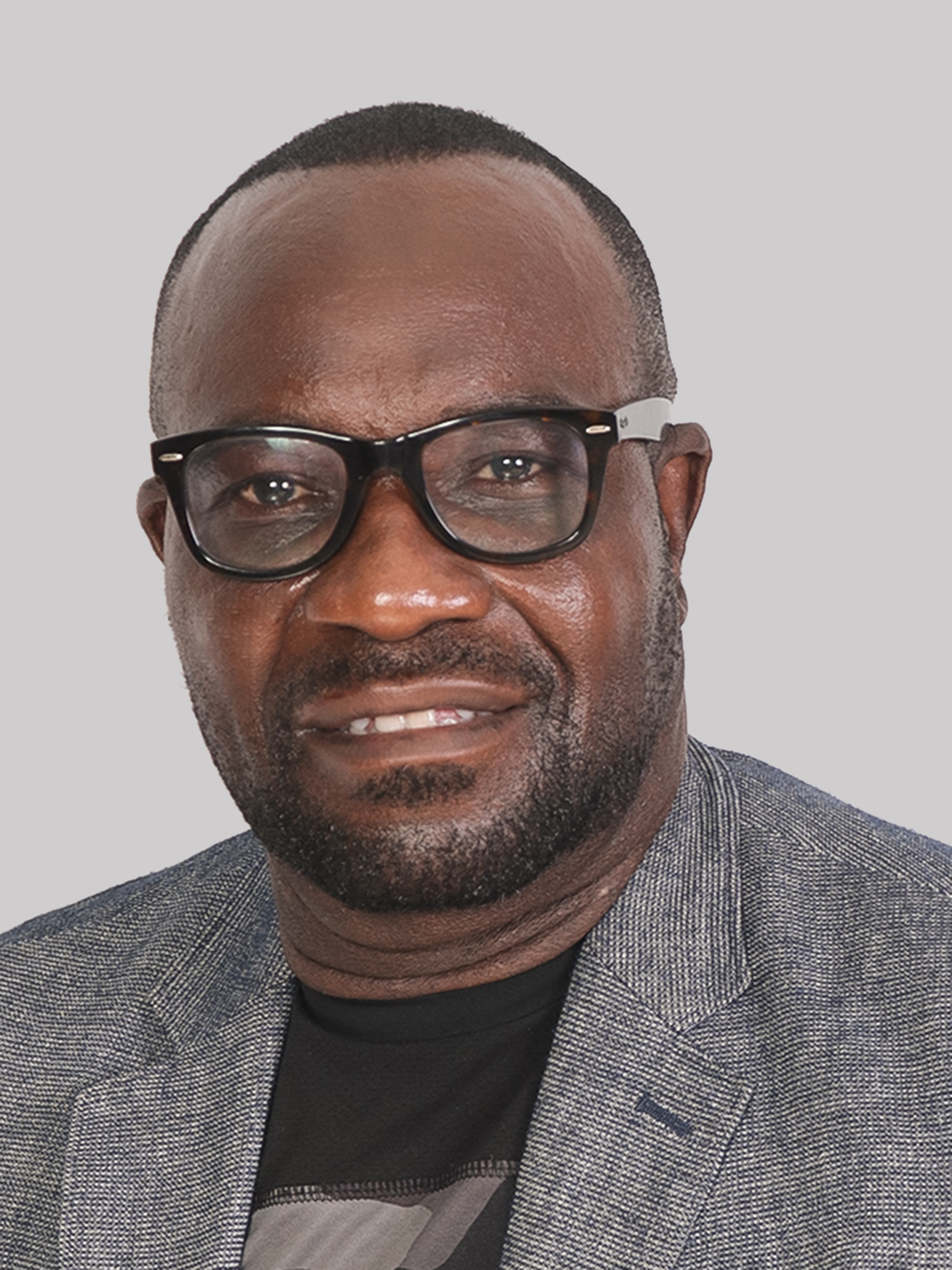

Member of Parliament for Akan Constituency
- Incumbent
- Assumed office 7 January 2021
- Preceded by: Kwaku Agyemang-Manu

Personal details
- Born: Yao Gomado; 20 October 1966 (age 59) Dodo-Dompa, Ghana
- Party: National Democratic Congress
- Occupation: Politician
- Profession: Electrical Engineer
- Committees: Judiciary Committee; Environment, Science and Technology Committee

Yao Gomado (born 20 October 1966) is a Ghanaian politician and member of the Ninth Parliament of the Fourth Republic of Ghana representing the Akan Constituency in the Oti Region on the ticket of the National Democratic Congress.

== Early life and education ==
Gomado was born and hails from Dodo-Dompa in the Oti Region of Ghana. Yao Gomado passed his Common Entrance Examination in 1978 which enabled him to obtain his Ordinary Level and Advanced Level. He then proceeded to have his Electrical Engineering Practice in 1982, C&G Institute London, Part Two Electricals (Electrical Engineering Technician) in 1983, Class Two Marine Electrical Engineer (Marine Electrical and Automation Engineering) in 1987, Class Three Marine Engineer (Shipboard Marine Engineering Practitioner) in 2012, Converteam A Series Maintenance (Dynamic Position Maintenance) in 2013, Dynamic Positioning (Ship Dynamic Positioning Maintenance) in 2013, Shipboard Dynamic Position (Dynamic Position Maintenance) in 2013, Professional Development Certificate (Project Management) in 2014, Marine Surveyor (Hull & Machinery) (Shipboard Marine Surveyor) in 2015, Mini-MBA (Corporate Governance) in 2015, Class One Electro Technical (Marine Electro-Technical Engineering) in 2016, Corporate Member (Engineering Practitioner) in 2017, Shipboard Internal Auditor (ISM-ISPS-MLC) in 2018 at Regional Maritime Academy and Post Graduate Diploma (Strategic Management) in 2019 at Regional Maritime University.

== Career ==
Gomado worked at Volta Lake Transport Company Limited, Akosombo, Ghana as the Assistant Electrical Engineer during his National Service period. He worked with Neptune Ship Management PTE Ltd in Singapore as a Junior Marine Electrical Engineer. He again served as the Marine Electrical Engineer of PSM Perkapalan SDN BHD in Malaysia. Yao Gomado also worked with the Paccship Management PTE in Singapore as the Marine Electrical Engineer. He finally worked with the Oceanwave Maritime & Engineering Consultancy Limited as their technical director.

== Political life ==
Gomado refused the use of the government assigned Toyota V8 to provide water for his constituency. He again mortgaged his four-year salary to get grader for road repairs in his Akan Constituency. Gomado also assured and promised to improve standard of education in his constituency.

=== 2020 election ===
Gomado contested and won the 2020 NDC parliamentary primaries for Akan Constituency in the Oti Region of Ghana. Gomado won in the 2020 Ghanaian general elections on the ticket of the National Democratic Congress with 19,317 votes (58.69%) against Alhaji Rashid Bawa of the New Patriotic Party who had 13,300 votes (40.41%) to join the 8th Parliament of the Fourth Republic of Ghana.

=== 2024 elections ===
Gomado contested and won the 2024 NDC parliamentary primaries for Akan Constituency in the Oti Region of Ghana. Gomado won in the 2024 Ghanaian general elections on the ticket of the National Democratic Congress with 18,228 votes (60.41%) against Tassah Mustapha Tassah of the New Patriotic Party who had 11,772 votes (39.01%) and Aforla Yawa Mary who had 175 votes (0.58%) to join the 9th Parliament of the Fourth Republic of Ghana.

=== Committees ===
Gomado is a member of the Judiciary Committee. He is also a member of the Environment, Science and Technology Committee of the Eighth (8th) Parliament of the Fourth Republic of Ghana.

== Personal life ==
Gomado is a Christian. He is fluent in speaking Ewe and English.
