= Emmanuel Yao Adzator =

Ghanaian security expert

Director General Ghana Prisons Service
- President: John Mahama
- Preceded by: Matilda Baffour Awuah
- Succeeded by: Patrick Darko Missah

Personal details
- Born: Ghana
- Education: Kpando Secondary School, University of Ghana
- Occupation: Prison Officer
- Profession: Psychologist

Emmanuel Yao Adzator is a Ghanaian security expert. He was appointed by President John Dramani Mahama as the director general of the Ghana Prisons Service. He was succeeded by Patrick Darko Missah in March 2017.

== Education ==
Emmanuel Adzator had his second cycle education at Kpando Secondary School. He was admitted to the University of Ghana and graduated with a degree in psychology. He holds a diploma in human resource management from the Ghana Institute of Management and Public Administration.

== Career ==
Emmanuel Adzator was enlisted into the Ghana Prisons Service in April 1989. While at the service, he had several training in the corrections system including Correctional Reforms, Re-Entry and Reintegration at Joyfields Training Institute in Las Vegas, Nevada and Advanced Prisons Management, from the Galilee Management Institute, Israel.

Adzator has headed several prisons in Ghana including Nsawam Medium Security Prisons and Obuasi Local Prisons. He became the Ashanti Regional Prisons Commander. He was the General Staff Officer as well as the Criminal Records Officer at the Prisons Headquarters.

== Director General of Ghana Prisons Service ==
In January 2015, he was promoted from a deputy director of Prisons to Director of Prisons along with other superior prison officers. In March 2016, then President of Ghana, John Mahama, upon the advice of the Prisons Service Council, appointed him as Acting Director General of the Ghana Prisons Service. Prior to his appointment, he was the Deputy Director General of Prisons in charge of Finance and Administration. He was succeeded by Patrick Missah in 2017.

Political offices
Preceded by Matilda Baffour Awuah	Director General Ghana Prisons Service; 2016–2017	Succeeded by Patrick Darko Missah
