= Kpando Senior High School =

Second cycle institution in Kpando, Ghana

- Kpando; Ghana

Information
- Other name: KPASEC
- Former name: Kpando Secondary School
- Motto: Lux et Veritas (Light and Truth)
- Religious affiliation: Non Denominational
- Established: 26 January 1953
- Grades: Grade 9 to Grade 12 (SHS 1 to 3)
- Language: English
- Campus size: ~2600
- Campus type: Mixed
- Colors: Blue, White
- Accreditation: Ghana Education Service, Second Cycle Institution

Kpando Senior High School formerly known as Kpando Secondary School is a second cycle Co-Ed institution in the Kpando Municipal District of the Volta Region of Ghana. One of the three second cycle schools in the Kpando township. It is a category "A" school, granted by her amazing performance at the past few WAEC's examinations.

It runs all the Senior High School Courses approved by the Ghana Education Service. These are:

- General Arts
- General Science
- Visual Arts
- Business
- Home Economics

Kpando Senior High School also known as KPASEC improves quality teaching and learning due to the availability of facilities ranging from furnished classroom blocks, art studio, science laboratory, well stocked library and staff. In 2016, she ranked at 38th position in the WAEC results rankings.

It has facilities for sports and other extracurricular activities.

== History ==
The school was founded on 26 January 1953 as a non-denominational secondary school operating out of the Kpando Community Centre with 9 students. At the time, it was called the 'Kpando Day Secondary School' because it was purely a day school. By 1954 there were 66 students, including 2 female students, and 4 members of staff. The staff consisted of Mr. F.S. Dzide, Mr. E.K. Asamoah, Mr. F.K. Gollo, and The first headmaster Mr. N.J.C Bowron. The first school building was a temporary structure with asbestos sheet walls completed in 1955 at a cost of £2,263. The first female graduate teacher to join the staff was Mrs. M.M.S Tetteh in 1958. In 1967, under the leadership of the then headmaster Mr. Purser, the school was granted full boarding status by the Ministry of Education and changed its name to Kpando Secondary School. In 2023, the Headmaster of the school is Mr. Charles Evans Apreku.

== Education ==
Kpando Senior High School popularly called 'KPASEC' on June 29, 2019, became the first senior high school from the Volta Region to make it to the quarter-finals stage of the 2019 National Science & Mathematics Quiz. They beat contenders Kumasi High School and Aburi Girls' Shs in the sixteenth One-Eighth contest.

== Achievements ==
On 10 July 2024, Kpando Senior High School won the NSMQ contest against Abutia SHS and Dzodze-Penyi SHS with a whooping 75 points to qualify for the national championship.

In October 2024, they sailed through zonals and regionals to win the Energy Commission's SHS Renewable Energy competition at the Accra International Conference Center, demonstrating a strong grasp of technical concepts.

Kpando Senior High School (KPASEC) won the Zone 3 Ethical Hacking Zonal Championship in February 2023, scoring 84.8 points. The competition was part of a series of zonal events aimed at creating awareness and equipping students with employable skills in cybersecurity. The school's victory qualified them to participate in the national event.

One of the best WASSCE performances in the country at whole, having less than 3% of students failing to have at least a pass (C6) in any given course. For instance, the 2023 results saw a remarkable 96% pass rate in English, 89% in Mathematics, 86% in Integrated Science, and 92% in Social Studies.

== Notable alumni ==
- Emmanuel Yao Adzator - former Director-General of the Ghana Prisons Service
- Joseph Amenowode, Ghanaian politician and academic
- Jones Dotse, Justice of the Supreme Court of Ghana (2008–2023)
- John Kwadwo Gyapong, Ghanaian politician
- Clemence Jackson Honyenuga, Justice of the Supreme Court of Ghana (2020–2023) and Paramount Chief of Nyagbo Traditional Area
- Eric Seddy Kutortse, Founder and Chairman of First Sky Group
- Fella Makafui, actress
- Paskal A. B. Rois, Honrorary Consul of Indonesia to Ghana.
- Gabriel Ayum Teye, Vice Chancellor of the University for Development Studies
