= Matilda Baffour Awuah =

Ghanaian female security expert

Director General Ghana Prisons Service
- President: John Atta Mills
- Preceded by: Michael Kofi Bansah
- Succeeded by: Emmanuel Yao Adzator

Personal details
- Born: Ghana
- Education: Aburi Girls, University of Ghana
- Occupation: Prison officer
- Profession: Administrator

Matilda Baffour Awuah is a Ghanaian female security expert and a former Director General of the Ghana Prisons Service.

== Education and working life ==
Matilda Awuah attended Aburi Girls Secondary School in the Eastern Region of Ghana. She proceeded to the University of Ghana and graduated with a Bachelor of Arts Degree in Modern History. She holds a master's degree in Public Administration from the School of Administration of the University of Ghana and a Post Graduate Diploma in Journalism and Public Relations from the School of Communication Studies. In 1981 she enlisted into the Ghana Prisons Service prior to graduating from the Military Academy and Training School in Teshie in June 1982. Her training in security resulted in her schooling at LBJ School of Public Affairs, University of Texas at Austin and at the International Management Training Centre, Worthing.

After years of service she was made the head of public relations at the Prisons Headquarters and then the Chief Welfare Officer. She headed several female prisons in Ghana including the Nsawam Female Prison and James Fort Female Prison. Part of her international assignment was with the United Nations Mission in South Sudan.

== Director General of Ghana Prisons Service ==
In March 2013, then President of Ghana, John Atta Mills, upon the advice of the Prisons Service Council, appointed her as Acting Director General of the Ghana Prisons Service. She replaced Michael Kofi Bansah who had retired and had been in charge of Finance and Administration of the Service. The acting position was made substantive in November 2018. She retired in January 2016 and was replaced by Emmanuel Yao Adzator.

Political offices
Preceded by Michael Kofi Bansah	Ghana; 2013-2016	Succeeded by Emmanuel Yao Adzator
