= Nyankpala =

Nyankpala Beyom Yili
- Town
- Location of Nyankpala in Northern region, Ghana
- Coordinates: 9°24′00″N 0°59′00″W
- Country: Ghana
- Region: Northern Region
- District: Tolon District
- Elevation: 560 ft (170 m)
- Time zone: GMT
  - Summer (DST): GMT
- Area code: 00233

Nyankpala, with the appelation Beyom Yili, is a town located about 10 miles south-west of Tamale, the capital of the Northern Region of Ghana. It is located under the Tolon constituency. The University for Development Studies (UDS) has its premier campus located in the town. This campus is the first of the university's campuses, the first to be established in northern Ghana.

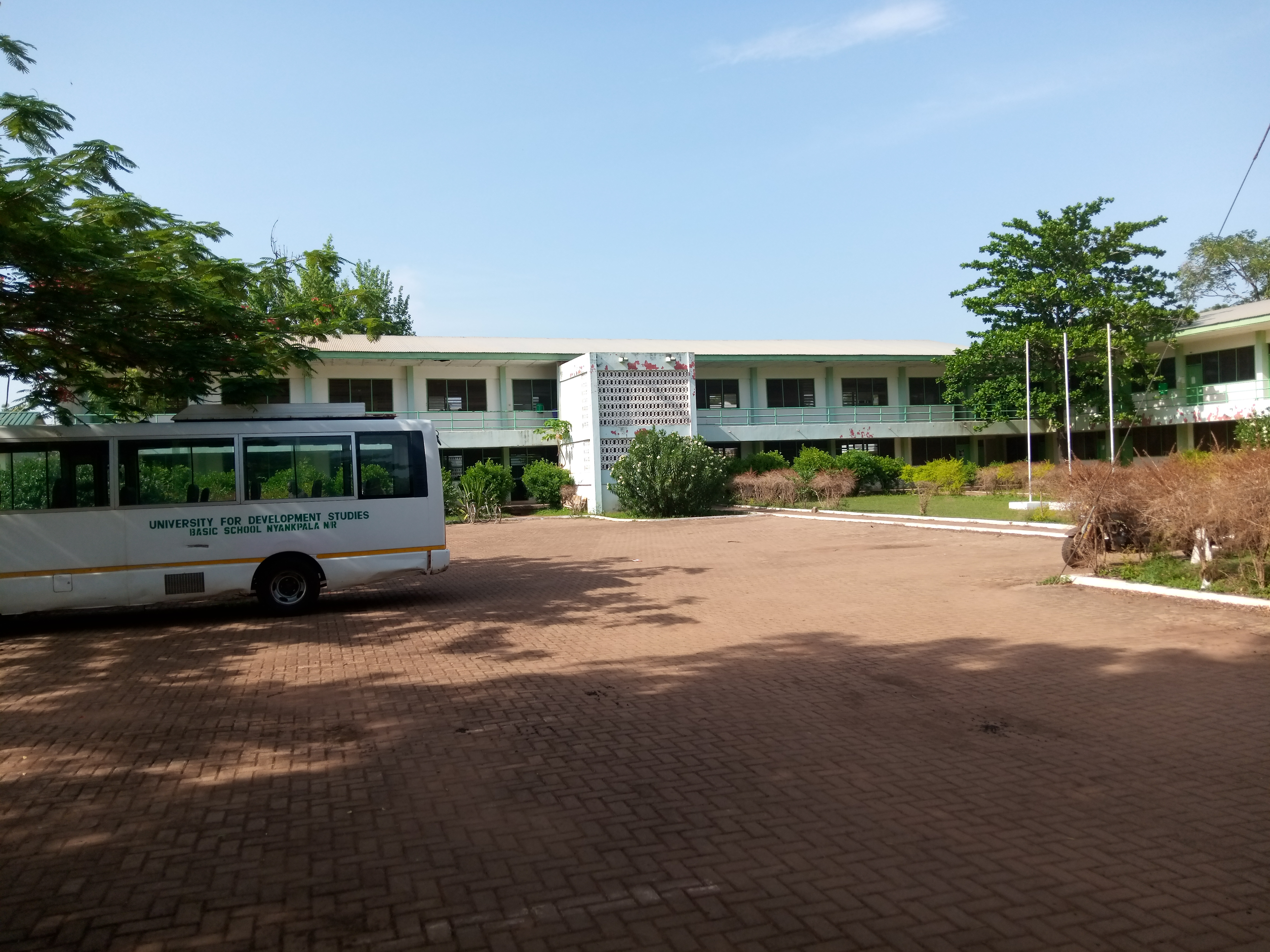
UDS Nyankpala Campus

Nyankpala is the hub for some important Government Institutions including the headquarters of Savanna Agricultural Research Institute (SARI) of the Council for Scientific and Industrial Research (CSIR), an on-farm station of the Animal Research Institute (ARI), on-farm station of the Soil Research Institute. Also, other institutions include the Avnash rice industry, which has a major rice factory located in the town, and the Golinga Irrigation Dam. These institutes have been the destination of students and academics on educational tours.

The main preoccupation of people in Nyankpala is farming.

== Etymology ==
Nyankpala derives its name from the Dagbanli language, where "Nya" translates to "see" and "Kpalim" translates to "stay" or "dwell". The name encapsulates the essence of people visiting the town and choosing to make it their permanent residence.

The official appellation of the town in Dagbon, 'Beyom Yili,' originates from the combination of the terms 'Beyom,' signifying 'Proximate,' and 'Yili,' which translates to 'House.' As a result, Nyankpala is also called Beyomyili or House of the Proximate.

== Education ==
Nyankpala is a home to both public and private schools, starting from crèche to university. The first public school that was established is the Nyankpala District Assembly (D/A) Junior High School.

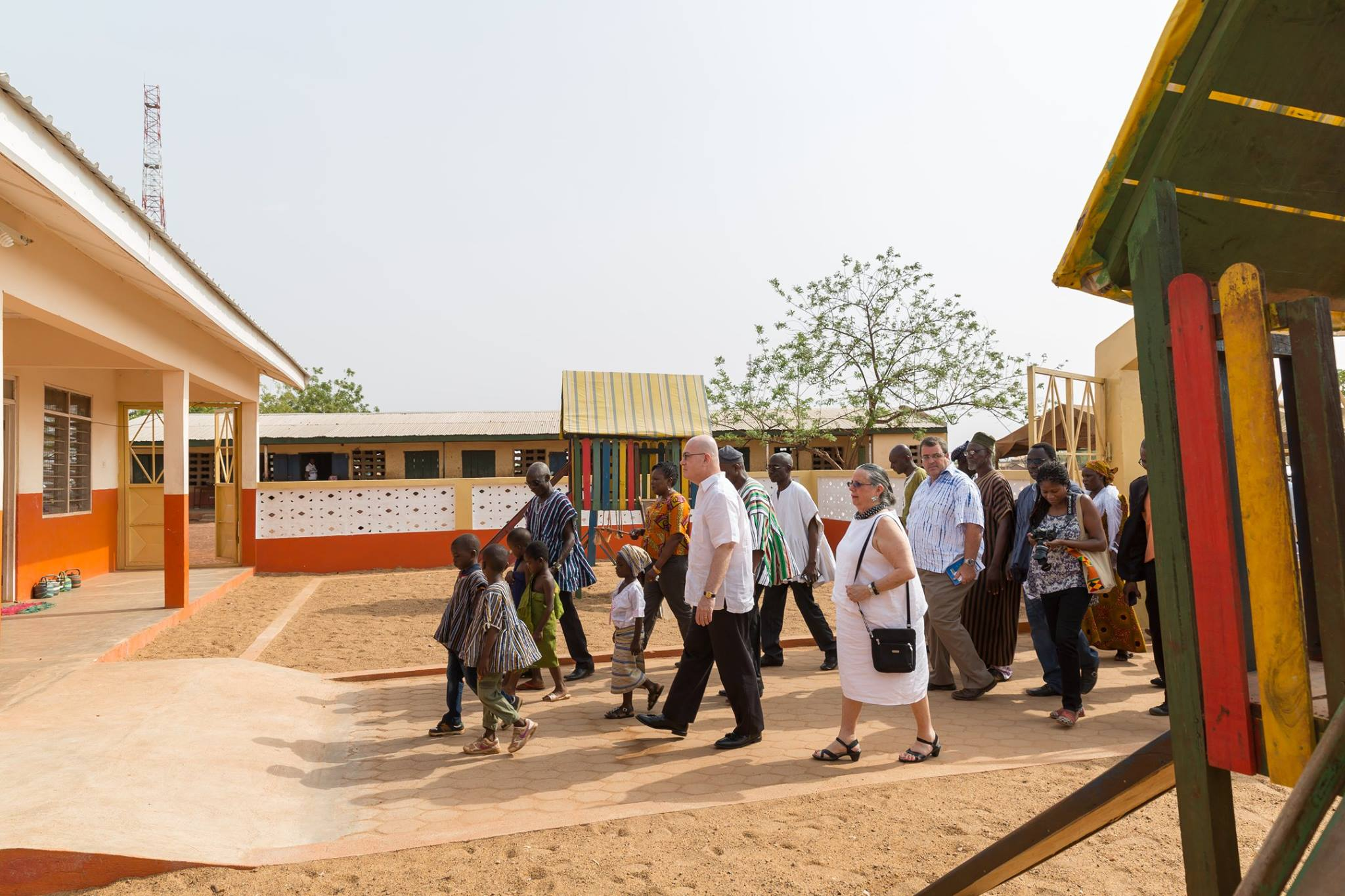
Nyankpala D/A School

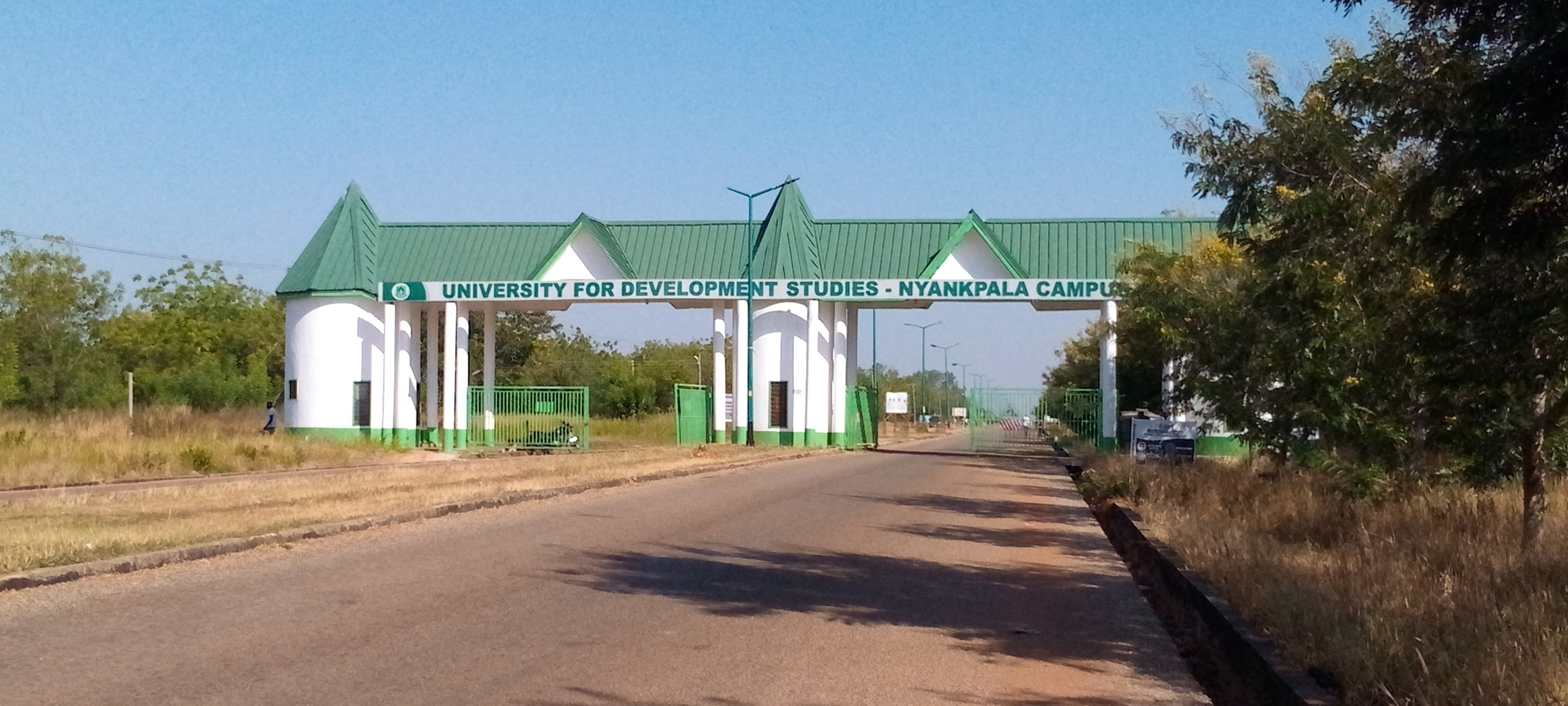
Entrance to UDS Nyankpala Campus.

Others Include: Nizamia English and Arabic (E/A) Junior High School, St. Monica's Roman Catholic (R/C) Junior High School, Islamia E/A Junior High School, the Nyankpala Model School, Da-awatul deen E/A primary school, and numerous Primary Schools and Kindergartens.It is under the Nyankpala circuit based on Tolon GES directorate.

One prominent private school in the town is Shepherd of the Hills Community School located adjacent the Church of Pentecost near the SARI premises.

The town is home to the premier campus of one of Ghana's most important public universities, the University for Development Studies.

== Commerce ==
Nyankpala has market days running every 6 days. During market days, traders, students, farmers and government workers troop to the market to purchase groceries and other items. Nyankpala is known across Dagbon as the hub for mango, rice farms and rice products. This apparently attracted Avnash rice Industries to set its mega rice processing plant in the community.

The advent of the University for Development Studies in Nyankpala has increased the prices of rent within the Nyankpala township.

== Governance ==
The town is governed by both traditional and government appointed authority. The chief of Nyankpala is the apex authority in the traditional leadership of the town. He is assisted by a council of elders known as Kpambalba (elders). The chief also has authority over several communities under the Nyankpala Traditional Area. The paramount chief of Nyankpala is enskinned by the Yaa Naa, the King of the Kingdom of Dagbon. The Nyankpala chiefdom has several villages and towns under it. These include: Kpalisoɣu, Kpana, Gawaɣu, Daasuyili, Tingoli, Nafariŋ, Tuunaayili, Gbulahagu, Gbinjari, Adubiliyili, Kukuonaayili, and Golinga, under its jurisdiction and which it enskins.

=== Elders of the Court of Chief of Nyankpala ===
- Wulana, deputy to Chief.
- Naa Zo, right-hand man of Chief.
- Kpana Lana, Chief of Spears.
- Kanbon Naa, commander of traditional forces.
- Lun Naa, leader of court historians (Lunsi).
- Zaachi, officer in charge of law and order.
- Nachin Naa, Chief of the youth.
- So Naa, Chief of the Blacksmiths.
- Nakoha Naa, Chief of the Butchers.
- Bilsi Naa, Chief of water wells.
- Gushee Naa
- Tuzhee Naa
- Kpihiga Naa
- Dohi Naa
- Silimboma Naa
- Limam, Chief Imam.
- Yari Naa
- Vawagri Naa
- Yimaha Naa
- Silimboma Naa

== Past and present chiefs ==
- Naa Kaleem Kpema (Builder of the Beyom Palace)
- Naa Damba
- Naa Kaleem Bila
- Naa Yibram Kpema
- Naa Abdulai Yakubu
- Naa Yibram Bila
- Naa Mahama( currently 2023)

== Neighbourhoods ==
- Zogbeli
- Dabokpaa
- Zoozuɣu
- Yaɣbila
- Gumbihini
- Nayilifong
- Nakohagufong
- Baatingli
- UDS
- Quarters
- Bungalows
- SARI

== Religion ==
The town is predominantly a Muslim community. The court of the chief acknowledges both African Traditional Religion and Islam. Christianity is more recent, but the population is active. Some of the schools in the town are run with religious influence. The St. Monica's R/C Schools are run by the Catholic Church, Nizamia E/A Schools, Islamia E/A Schools, and Nawaria E/A Schools are run by Muslim groups.

== Tourism in Nyankpala ==
=== Tourist sites ===
- Beyom Palace
- University for Development Studies
- Savanna Agricultural Research Institute
- Animal Research Institute
- Nakoha Tii Gbuni
- Avnash Rice Industry
- Wono yili (Shrine)
- Golinga irrigation Dam
- Zoɣu Dabari (Ruins of Zoɣu), ancient archaeological site, now used as farmlands.
- Baatingli big tree

== Water Resources ==
- Gbulaha Moɣli (Gbulahagu Lake)
- Moɣ palli or Naa Moɣli (New/Chief's Pond)
- Moɣ kurli (Old Pond)
- Palli bieng (Road Paddy Pond)
- Banker (Paddy Pond)
- Moɣ Pielli (White Pond)
- Moɣ Zheɣu (Red Pond)
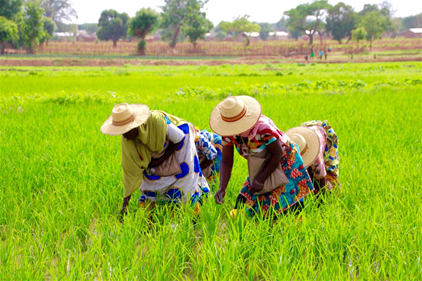
  Golinga Irrigation Site

== Football ==
- Shooting Stars
- Beyom Soccer Ambassadors

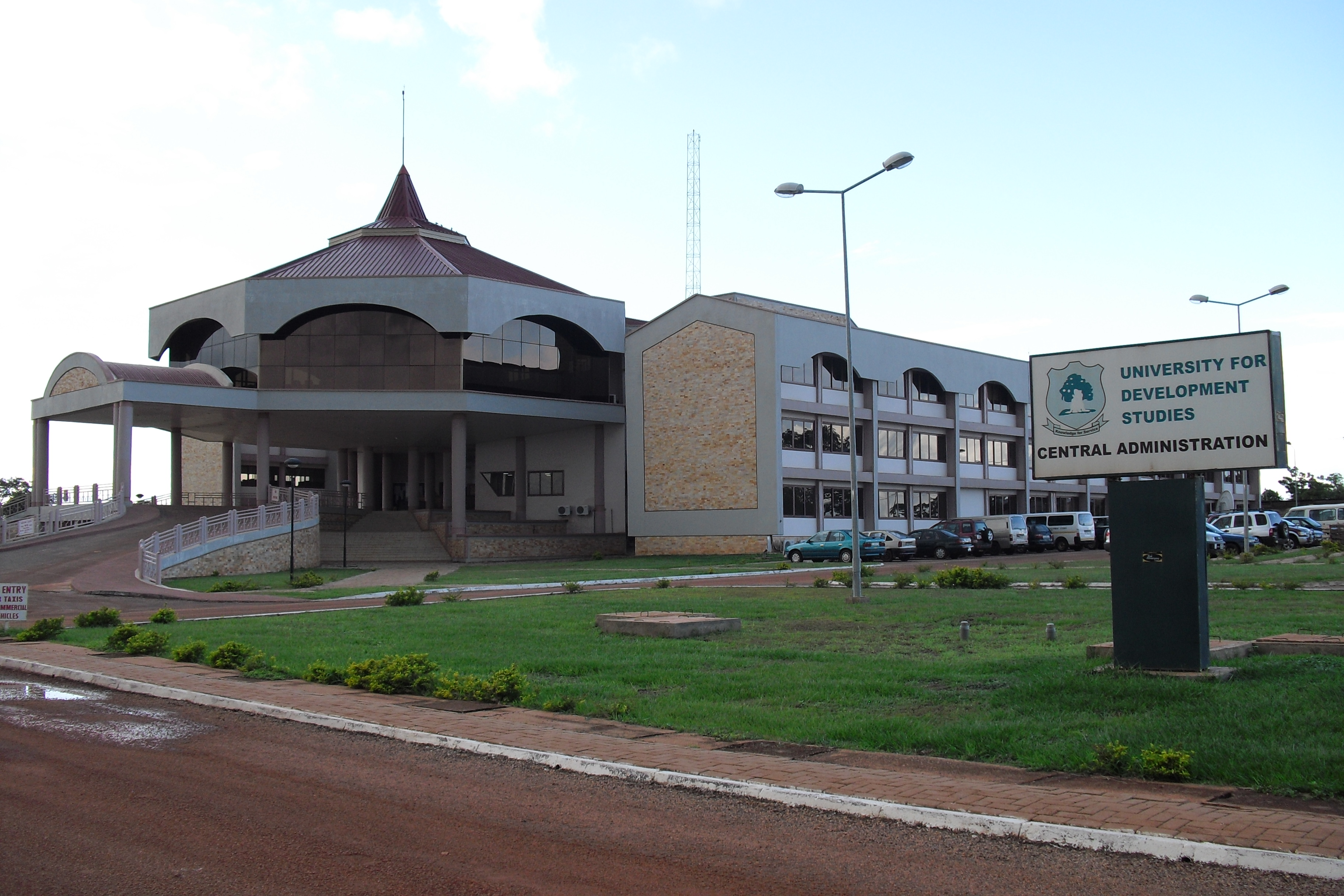
Central Administration, University for Development Studies.
