= Patrick Darko Missah =

Ghanaian agriculturalist

Director General of the Ghana Prisons Service
- President: Nana Akuffo-Addo

Personal details
- Born: Ghana
- Education: University of Ghana, GIMPA
- Occupation: Prison Officer
- Profession: Agriculturalist

Patrick Darko Missah is a Ghanaian agriculturalist and human resource person. He has been a prison officer since 1989 and was appointed in 2017 by President Nana Akuffo-Addo as the Director General of the Ghana Prisons Service.

== Early life and education ==
Missah had his secondary education at Suhum Secondary Technical School, where he obtained his O level certificate and proceeded to Ofori Panin Secondary School for his A level education. He holds a bachelor's and master's degree in agriculture from the University of Ghana. Darko Missah has diplomas in human resource management and agricultural administration from the Ghana Institute of Management and Public Administration.

== Working life ==
Patrick Missah joined the Ghana Prisons Service in 1989 as a superior corporal. Due to his background in agriculture, his first posting in the service was as the Officer-In-Charge of the Agriculture Unit at the Nsawam Medium Security Prison till 1991. In 2002, he was Chief Agriculture Officer of the service till 2006. He completed his Master of Philosophy in Agricultural Extension at the University of Ghana in 2009. He rose through the ranks from Assistant Superintendent of Prisons to a Deputy Controller. His years in the service resulted in him participating in various correctional and leadership training programmes including Emergency Management Response Training at the International Corrections Management Training Centre in Colorado. Patrick Missah has headed several medium to high security prisons in Ghana including James Camp Prisons in Accra and Sekondi Central Prisons. He was the Western Regional Commander of the Ghana Prisons Service before being made a Deputy Director of Prisons in charge of operations. As the deputy director in charge of operations, he brought the plight of the prisons service and inmate to national attention when he cited the levels of congestion in prisons. He made known that the Nsawam prison which was to house 717 inmates had 3,747 which was a 340 percentage increase. In 2015, John Dramani Mahama promoted him along with sixteen other superior officers to the level of Director of Prisons.

== Director of prisons ==
In March 2017, President Akuffo-Addo appointed Patrick Missah as the Acting Director General of the Ghana Prisons Service in pursuant of Ghana Prisons Act of the Constitution of Ghana. He replaced Emmanuel Yao Adzator was reassigned from the service. Patrick Missah's was made the substantive director general of the service in February 2018. During his induction service, he promised to improve the operations standards of the prisons service by increasing collaboration with both public and private institutions.

== Medals ==
- Medal for 50th Independence Anniversary of Ghana
- Long-service medal for Peace keeping Operations - UNAMID
- Good conduct - Ghana Prison Service

Political offices
Preceded by Emmanuel Yao Adzator	Ghana; 2017 -	Incumbent
