= Gabriel Ayum Teye =

Ghanaian educationist (born 1964)

Gabriel Ayum Teye (born January 1964) is a Ghanaian educationist who is a lecturer and currently acting as the vice dean of students of the University for Development Studies.

== Early life and education ==
Teye had his basic education at Abertiso Roman Catholic Primary School in 1969. He had his middle school education at the Korwhere Roman Catholic Middle School in the Upper Manya district, from 1975 to 1979. He then attained his secondary education at the Manya Krobo and Kpando Senior High School from 1979 to 1986 for his GCE 'O' level and GCE ‘A’ respectively. He graduated from Kwame Nkrumah University of Science And Technology with a Bsc degree in agriculture (Animal Science) in 1991 and in 1996, he obtained his Msc degree from the same university. He holds a PhD in Meat Science and Technology from the University of Bristol, UK and a diploma in Modern Management and Administration from Cambridge International College also in the UK.

== Career ==
Ayum career began in 1996 when he was appointed a lecturer at the university for development studies. He has since been with the university and became the head of the Animal Science Department from 2005 to 2008. He was Dean of the Faculty of Agriculture from 2008 to 2012 and became the Pro-Vice-Chancellor from 2012 until he was appointed the Vice Chancellor on October 1, 2015. Ayum is also a reviewer of the Ghana Journal of Animal Science, Journal of Food, Animal and Food Research, African Journal of Food, Agriculture, Nutrition and Development and the Ghana Journal of Agricultural Science.
