= Joshua Makubu =

Ghanaian politician

Hon Joshua Makubu

Minister of Oti Region
- In office 2021 – February 2024
- President: Nana Akufo-Addo
- Preceded by: Nana Kwasi Owusu-Yeboah
- Succeeded by: Daniel Machator

Personal details
- Born: 12 September 1980 (age 45) Ghana
- Party: New Patriotic Party
- Children: 1
- Occupation: Politician • Advocate

Joshua Gmayenaam Makubu (born 12 September 1980) is a Ghanaian politician. He was the Minister of Oti Region in Ghana between 2021 and 2024. President Nana Akufo-Addo nominated him for the position. He is the second person with a disability to be appointed as a Ghanaian minister. He was replaced by Daniel Machator in a cabinet reshuffle in February 2024.

== Background ==
He is from Nkwanta South district. He had one leg surgically amputated when he was either 8 or 9 years old. He attended EP Senior High School in Saboba, Northern Region, before enrolling at Kwame Nkrumah University of Science and Technology. He graduated with a BSc. in Actuarial Science. He later earned a MPhil in Business Administration at the University of Ghana. He is pursuing a PhD in Finance at University of Ghana Business School and also has a Higher National Diploma in statistics. He works as a teacher and an advocate.

== Politics ==
He is a member of the New Patriotic Party, for whom he began serving as regional secretary in 2018. His predecessor in office was Nana Kwasi Owusu-Yeboah, the former and first Oti Regional Minister.
