= Clemence Jackson Honyenuga =

Ghanaian lawyer & judge (born 1952)

Justice Clemence Jackson Honyenuga

Justice of the Supreme Court of Ghana
- In office 2020–2023
- Appointed by: Nana Akufo-Addo

Justice of the Court of Appeal
- In office 2008–2020
- Nominated by: John Kufuor

Justice of the High Court
- In office 2003–2008
- Nominated by: John Kufuor

Personal details
- Born: 4 September 1952 (age 73) Nyagbo-Gagbefe, Volta Region
- Education: Kadjebi-Asato Secondary School; Kpando Senior High School
- Alma mater: University of Ghana
- Profession: Judge

Clemence Jackson Honyenuga (born 4 September 1952) is a Ghanaian former judge, who served in the Supreme Court of Ghana from 22 May 2020 until 4 September 2022.

== Early life and education ==
Honyenuga was born on 4 September 1952 in Nyagbo-Gagbefe, a town in the Volta Region of Ghana. He received his primary education at R.C. Primary School in Tafi-Atome, and then continued at L/A Middle School in Tafi-Atome where he obtained his Middle School Leaving Certificate. Afterwards, he attended Kadjebi Secondary School where he received his Ordinary Level Certificate in 1967. From 1973 to 1975, he attended Kpando Secondary School (now Kpando Senior High School) where he obtained his GCE Advanced Level Certificate.

Honyenuga then pursued further studies at the University of Ghana in 1976, earning a B.A. degree in Law and Political Science in 1979. In 1979, he enrolled at the Ghana School of Law, and upon completion, he was admitted to the Ghana Bar in 1981.

== Career ==
Honyenuga started his career as an Executive Officer at the PWD Personnel Branch in Accra from January to September 1976. Later, from 1981 to 1982, he worked as an Assistant State Attorney in Ho. He entered Private Practice and worked at Amewu Chambers in Ho from 1983 until 2003.

His career at the bench begun when he gained appointment as the Judge Advocate of the Ghana Navy. He served as a justice of the High Court until 2008 when he was appointed a justice of the Appeal Court of Ghana. Between 2008 and 2016, he worked as an Additional High Court Judge, presiding over cases such as Civil, Narcotics, Robbery, and other Violent Crime Cases. In 2009 served as a judge at the Court-sitting of the Justice for all Programme and in 2014, he doubled as the Director of the Remand Prisoners Project.

Honyenuga held various positions within the Ghana Bar Association, including Assistant Secretary (Volta Region Branch) from 1983 to 1988, Welfare Officer from 1993 to 1996, Treasurer from 1996 to 2001, and Vice President from 2002 to 2003.

Additionally, he served as President of the Court of Appeal in Cape Coast from 2012 to 2017, and was appointed a judge responsible for Anti-Corruption in 2013. He served as the Chairman of the Medical Committee for Judges, Magistrates, and Directors of the Judicial Service in 2019, as well as the Supervisor of the Justice for all Programme (JAP) and the Prisons High Courts. He is a member of the Ghana Bar Association and the Association of Magistrates and Judges of Ghana.

As the paramount chief of the Nyagbo Traditional Area, Honyenuga has been a Permanent Member of the Volta Regional House of Chiefs, Ho, since 2012.

== Supreme Court appointment ==
=== Nomination ===
On 17 March 2020 the president, Nana Akufo-Addo informed the Speaker of Parliament, Mike Oquaye that consultations had been completed for the nomination of Justice Honyenuga and three other persons to be made justices of the Supreme Court of Ghana. The speaker of parliament announced his nomination together with the three others to parliament on 19 March 2020 for vetting and approval.

=== Vetting and endorsement allegations ===
Justice Honyenuga was vetted by parliament on Monday 11 May 2020.

During the vetting process, he was questioned on his alleged endorsement of the president and the ruling political party, the New Patriotic Party. This allegation was due to a statement he made in a durbar where he reportedly said; "with the vision of the President and the gains made in his first term, Ghanaians may consider giving him another four years." In his defence he said he, "did not endorse the presidency of Nana Addo Dankwa Akufo-Addo in his personal capacity but was a speech he was elected to read on behalf of the chiefs and people of Afadjato when the President visited the Volta region." He also apologised saying; "In reading that statement, we didn’t intend endorsing the president. Our understanding was that we were wishing him well… If out of political dissatisfaction some people are unhappy with whatever I am supposed to have said then I am sorry." The judge's statement made during the durbar was greeted with criticism and was widely condemned. The Ghanaian journalist and political analyst, Kweku Baako described the alleged endorsement as an "unwarranted sycophancy".

He added that the judge had stained his reputation through the alleged endorsement and also opined that if he had the opportunity to advise the president on the matter, he would have told the president to "drop him". The Volta Regional Chairman of the National Democratic Congress (NDC), Henry Kwadzo Ametefe concurred, saying the judge's alleged endorsement was a violation of the code of conduct of the judiciary and called on the Legal Council and the Chairman of the Judicial Council, the Chief Justice to take "appropriate action".

During his vetting on Monday 11 May 2020, he dismissed claims that the apex court was saddled with determining "political cases". He said the court is not a place for politics.

During the vetting process for Honyenuga's appointment, the minority on the Appointment committee walked out of the public hearing after the chairman of the Committee disallowed a question from North Tongu MP, Okudzeto Ablakwa. But they later returned.

=== Approval and swearing in ===
Following his vetting by parliament, Honyenuga was approved by parliament on Wednesday 20 May 2020 and sworn into office on Friday 22 May 2020 with the president particularly congratulating him for his conduct during his vetting by parliament amidst the endorsement allegations. He was sworn in together with Justice Issifu Omoro Tanko Amadu.

== See also ==
- List of judges of the Supreme Court of Ghana
- Supreme Court of Ghana
