= Paskal A. B. Rois =

Ghanaian entrepreneur and diplomat

Paskal Augustine Bronson Rois (29 August 1978) is a Ghanaian diplomat, entrepreneur and musician. He is the honorary consul of the Republic of Indonesia in Ghana and also the Founder and chief executive officer of Rois Group of companies Limited.

== Early life and education ==
Rois was born in Ho in the Volta Region to the Ben Cudjoe Buoh, a former SSNIT worker from Akrofu Xeviwofe near Ho, and Josephine Akosua Kassah, a retired educationist from Dzodze-Penyi in the Volta Region. He attended A.M.E Zion Primary in Penyi, Methodist Junior High School in Ho, and Kpando Senior High School in Kpando for his high school education. Rois obtained Higher National Diploma in Purchasing and Supply from the Accra Technical University. He furthered his education and obtained Bachelor of Science in Procurement from the Ghana Institute of Management and Public Administration (GIMPA).

== Career ==
Rois started work as an offshore materials administrator with Seadrill Ltd, an international oil drilling company in 2012. He was able to establish his own oil company Rig Oil International Services (ROIS) Ltd within a spate of one month after joining Seadrill Ltd. ROIS Ltd, a subsidiary of ROIS Group of Companies Ltd, is an upstream service provider in the oil and gas industry in Ghana and other countries in Africa. In 2013, he established Elolo Oil and Gas Ltd and Jokas Oil Fields Services (JOS) Ltd. He later established other companies in the mining, oil and gas, energy, aviation, media, agriculture, health and hospitality sectors.

In April 2021, he was appointed as the honorary consul of the Republic of Indonesia in Ghana under the Presidential Decree of the Republic of Indonesia by Joko Widodo. He was sworn into office on 26 May 2021 in attendance of Ambassador Dr Usra Hendra Harahap, Indonesian Ambassador to the Federal Republic of Nigeria. One of his key roles is to ensure the safety of the Indonesian community in Ghana and help build upon the existing bilateral relationship between Ghana and Indonesia.

== Personal life ==
Rois is a Christian. He is married to Gifty Etsa Rois who is also a share holder of ROIS Group Ltd. The couple have three children. He is a motivational speaker and identifies himself as a mentor for the youth on the African continent. He is an Ewe.

He began his music career in 1999–2000 under the stage name Togbe Afrika and had 4 albums to his credit. His songs such as 'Danye Sidzima', 'Menya be Awoenam', 'Kpedentor', 'Mawuneyrawo Togbe Afefe among others were popular in Ghana, Togo, and Benin in the early 2000s.
