= Jones Dotse =

Ghanaian judge

Justice of the Supreme Court of Ghana
- In office 11 June 2008 – 8 June 2023
- Appointed by: John Kufuor

Justice of the Court of Appeal
- In office 16 September 2003 – 11 June 2008
- Nominated by: John Kufuor

Justice of the High Court
- In office June 2002 – 16 September 2003
- Nominated by: John Kufuor

Personal details
- Born: 8 June 1953 (age 72) Volta Region, Ghana
- Education: Kpando Secondary School; Accra Academy
- Alma mater: University of Ghana; Ghana School of Law
- Profession: Lawyer; Judge

Jones Victor Mawulorm Dotse is a Ghanaian judge. He was a Supreme Court judge of Ghana and has also served on the Supreme Court of the Gambia. He was appointed a judge of both courts in 2008.

== Early life and education ==
Dotse was born on 8 June 1953 and hails from Kpando in the Volta Region. He attended Kpando Secondary School from 1966 to 1971 and was educated at Accra Academy from 1971 to 1973. He studied law at the University of Ghana, Legon, graduating in June 1976 and was called to the Ghanaian Bar in November 1978.

== Working life ==
Dotse worked as a State Attorney with the Attorney-General's Department from 1979 to 1981. After this stint, he went into private practice. He founded Mawulorm Chambers in Ho in the Volta Region. He served as president of the Volta Region Branch of the Ghana Bar Association. He handed over Mawulorm Chambers to Stephen Dzanku and Ernest Gaewu.

Dotse became a high court judge in June 2002 and became a judge in the Court of Appeal on 16 September 2003. He was sworn in as a Justice of the Supreme Court of the Gambia in February 2008 and in June of that same year became a Justice of the Supreme Court of Ghana.

He has attended and led courses and seminars in several countries including the United States, Canada, Nigeria, Liberia and Ghana. He also served as the Chairman of the Governing Board of the Judicial Training Institute in Accra.

Dotse has been chairman of the board of Ho Technical University. He is currently chairman of the university council of the University of Health and Allied Sciences in Ho. Dotse is also chairman of the board of governors of Accra Academy.

He worked 21 years on the bench in Ghana and served as Justice of the Supreme Court for 15 years.

== Acting Chief Justice ==
Following the retirement of Justice Kwasi Anin-Yeboah on 24 May 2023, Dotse became the acting Chief Justice. This is in accordance with article 144 (6) of the 1992 constitution that states that; in the event of the Chief Justice position being vacant or the Chief Justice not being able to administer his or her duties as Chief Justice, the most senior judge of the Supreme Court bench acts as the Chief Justice until a substantive Chief Justice is sworn into office.

== Retirement ==
Dotse announced during a Supreme Court sitting on 5 April 2023 that he would be retiring on 8 June 2023.

The Supreme Court of Ghana bid farewell to Dotse then Acting Chief Justice, who retired on Thursday, 8 June 2023, upon reaching the age of 70. A valedictory ceremony was held at the court premises in Accra on Tuesday, 6 June 2023, to honour Justice Dotse's career and contributions to the legal system of Ghana.

During the valedictory ceremony, Chief Justice nominee Gertrude Araba Torkornoo praised Dotse for his commitment to justice and fairness. She highlighted his strong stance against corruption and abuse of public office in landmark cases such as Board of Governance Achimota School vrs Ni Aku Nortey II, Platinium Equity Limited and Land Commission, and Martin Alamisi Amidu vrs The Attorney General, Waterville Holdings (BVI) Limited and Alfred Agbesi Woyome.

Attorney General and Minister of Justice, Godfred Yeboah Dame praised Dotse for his contributions to Ghana's judicial system, highlighting his humility, kindness, and professionalism during the event. Dame recounted their first encounter in 2004 and acknowledged Dotse's gravity, patience, and aversion to pompous behaviour. He further commended Dotse's sense of humanity and compassion in adjudicating cases. Dame shared a specific case where Dotse overturned rulings of lower courts, rectifying an unfair termination and establishing an important precedent on privacy rights. Although Dame was unable to receive the judgement personally.

Justice Yonny Kulendi also expressed his mixed emotions during the valedictory ceremony. He described himself as feeling orphaned without the guidance of Justice Dotse. He spoke of Justice Dotse as a fatherly figure on the bench and admired his unique way of providing guidance and mentorship. Justice Kulendi shared a personal anecdote about how Justice Dotse influenced his decision to become a Supreme Court judge, highlighting the significant impact he had on his life. He expressed his gratitude for Justice Dotse's guidance and revealed that he still addresses him as "Papa" in private conversations, emphasising the deep bond they share.

During his final speech as a Supreme Court judge, he promised to continue fighting for justice.

== Personal life ==
Dotse is married with three children.

== See also ==
- List of judges of the Supreme Court of Ghana
- Supreme Court of Ghana
