= Ahamansu =

- Town
- Location in Ghana
- Coordinates: 7°43′42.8″N 0°33′07.8″E
- Country: Ghana
- Region: Oti Region
- District: Kadjebi District

Population (2010)
  - Total: 2,880
- Time zone: GMT
  - Summer (DST): GMT

Ahamansu, also known as Ahamasu or Ahamanso, is a farming community in the Kadjebi District of the Oti Region, Ghana. Ahamansu is one of six towns and area councils in the district.

It has a police station, health centre, palmnut processing plant and a sawmill. Cocoa seedlings to help rejuvenate farming in the Kadjebi District and oil palm nurseries are established under the Presidential Special Initiative Scheme.

Ahamansu Islamic Senior High School (AHISHS) is the only second-cycle institution in the community serving students from the community and its environs.
