= Kojo Obed Amoako-Prempeh =

Ghanaian public servant and politician

Member of the Ghana Parliament for Akan
- In office 1979–1981
- Preceded by: Stephen Kwadwo Osei-Nyame
- Succeeded by: Dr. Seth Kwabena Akompi

Member of the Ghana Parliament for Akan Wawa
- In office 1965–1966
- Preceded by: New
- Succeeded by: Constituency abolished

Personal details
- Born: Kojo Obed Amoako-Prempeh Gold Coast
- Party: Convention People's Party; People's National Party; National Convention Party

Kojo Obed Amoako-Prempeh was a Ghanaian public servant and politician. He was the member of parliament for the Akan Wawa constituency from 9 June 1965 to February 1966 when the Nkrumah government was overthrown. At the inception of the third republic, he was elected as the member of parliament for the Akan constituency on the ticket of the People's National Party. He served in this capacity from 1979 to 1981. Prior to politics, he was the Volta Region regional loans officer for the Cocoa Marketing Board.

== See also ==
- List of MPs elected in the 1965 Ghanaian parliamentary election
