= Borstal Institute for Juveniles =

Prison for juveniles in Ghana

Borstal Institute for juveniles
- Senior Correctional Centre

Agency overview
- Formed: 1947
- Jurisdiction: Republic of Ghana
- Headquarters: Ghana
- Parent agency: Ghana Prisons Service
- Website: Official Website

The Borstal Institute for juveniles, officially known as the Senior Correctional Centre (SCC), Is Ghana's principal correctional institution for juvenile offenders. It is a juvenile detention and reformation facility located in Roman Ridge, Accra. It operates under Ghana Prisons Service (GPS) and is responsible for the safe custody, rehabilitation, education, and reintegration of juveniles committed by the courts. The Centre operates within Ghana's juvenile justice system, aiming to reform young offenders through education, vocational training, counselling, and behavioural development, rather than punishment.

The institution was established to provide separate correctional facility for juveniles and has evolved into rehabilitation-focused Centre operating under the provisions of the Juvenile Justice Act, 2003 (Act 653) and other relevate laws governing juvenile justice in Ghana.

The center is a correctional institution for persons under the age of 18 who have been convicted of criminal or civil offences. Its primary objective is to rehabilitate and reform juvenile offenders through education, vocational training, counselling, and other correctional programs, with the aim of facilitating their successful reintegration into society upon release. The period that a convict spends in the Centre is aimed at reforming him or her so they can fit into society easily after their stay at the Centre.

== History ==
The Borstal Institute was established on 19 May 1947 during the colonial era as Ghana Borstal Institute to provide a separate correctional facility for juvenile offenders. The institution was created to separate children in conflict with the law from adult offenders, in line with international standards on juvenile justice, and provide opportunities for education, discipline, and rehabilitation.

Initially administered by the Department of Social Welfare, responsibility for the institution was transferred to Ghana Prisons Service in 1958 to strengthen correctional management.

Following the enactment of the Juvenile Justice Act,2003(Act 653), the Borstal Institute was renamed the Senior Correctional Centre in 2007, following reforms within the Ghana Prisons Service. Despite the name change, many government documents and members of the public continue to refer to it as the Borstal Institute. The renaming reflected Ghana's shift towards a correctional approach that emphasizes rehabilitation, education and reintegration of young offenders.

== Legal Framework ==
- The Senior Correctional Centre operates under Ghana's legal and institutional framework governing juvenile justice. Its work is guided byThe Constitution of Ghana (1992)
- The Children's Act, 2003 (Act 560)
- The Juvenile Justice Act, 2003 (Act 653) Justice
- The Prisons Service Act and related regulations.
- International instruments such as:
- United Nations Standard Minimum Rules for the Administration of Juvenile(Beijing Rules)
- United Nations Rules for the Protection of Juveniles Deprived of their Liberty (Havana Rules)

These laws emphasize rehabilitation rather than punishment and require that juveniles be treated in a manner that promotes their dignity and development.

== Administration ==
The Senior Correctional Centre is administered by the Ghana Prisons Service, and agency under the Ministry for the Interior.

The institution is managed by correctional officers and professionals including:

- Correctional administrators
- Welfare Officers
- Counsellors
- Teacher
- Vocational instructors
- Healthcare Personnel
- Phycologist and social workers

These professionals work together to develop individualised rehabilitation programs for juvenile offenders.

== Juvenile Justice ==
The Senior Correctional Centre forms an important part of Ghana’s juvenile justice system.

Children who commit offences are processed through specialized juvenile courts, which consider factors such as age, welfare, and the best interests of the child before imposing custodial or non-custodial measures.

The center accommodates juveniles who require custodial sentences while ensuring access to education, healthcare, counselling, and rehabilitation.

== See also ==
- Ghana Prisons Service
- Juvenile justice
- Children's Act, (Act 560)
- Juvenile Justice Act, 2003 (Act 653)
