= Haruna Yakubu =

Vice-Chancellor of University for Development Studies
- Preceded by: John Kaburise

Personal details
- Born: Tamale, Ghana
- Education: Moldova State University

Haruna Yakubu (born 24 October 1955) is a Vice-Chancellor of University for Development Studies.

== Education ==
He obtained a Master of Science degree in Physics and Mathematics in 1984 and a Doctor of Philosophy degree in Semiconductor Physics in 1992, both at Moldova State University, Chișinău, Moldova (Moldavian SSR until 1991).

== Career ==
Previous appointments include Pro-Vice Chancellor of the University of Cape Coast, Chairman of the Governing Council of the Centre for Renewable Energy Studies (CRES), executive member – Ghana Solar Energy Society, fellow – Council for Advancement and Support for Education-UK, Associate Member – International Centre for Theoretical Physics (ICTP), and Member – Governing Council of the Foundation for Security and Development in Africa (FOSOA).
