= Joseph Kwadwo Ofori =

Ghanaian politician

Joseph Kwadwo Ofori (born 13 March 1967) is a former Ghanaian politician and member of the Sixth Parliament of the Fourth Republic of Ghana representing the Akan constituency in the Oti Region formerly Volta Region of Ghana as an independent.

== Personal life ==
Ofori is married with one child. He is a Christian (Evangelical Presbyterian).

== Early life and education ==
Ofori was born on 13 March 1967. He hails from Kadjebi, in the Oti Region of Ghana. He had his GCE 'O' Level at Kadjebi Asato Senior High School in 1990.

== Politics ==
Ofori is a member of the National Democratic Congress (NDC). He first became a member of Parliament in 2009 after winning his poll in the 2008 Ghanaian general election and represented the Akan constituency. Which resulted in him becoming a member of the Fifth Parliament of the Fourth Republic of Ghana. In 2012, He contested for re-election into the Akan seat on the ticket of the NDC in the 2012 Ghanaian general election and won.

He was a committee member of Employment, Social Welfare and State, Special Budget.

== Career ==
Ofori was a Member of Parliament from 2009 to 2012 for the Akan constituency in the Volta Region. He is a businessman.

He was the managing director of Wofa Paye Company Limited.

== Personal ==
Joseph is a Christian (Evangelical Presbyterian).
