= University for Development Studies =

Public University in Ghana

Coordinates: 9.3738°N 0.8843°W

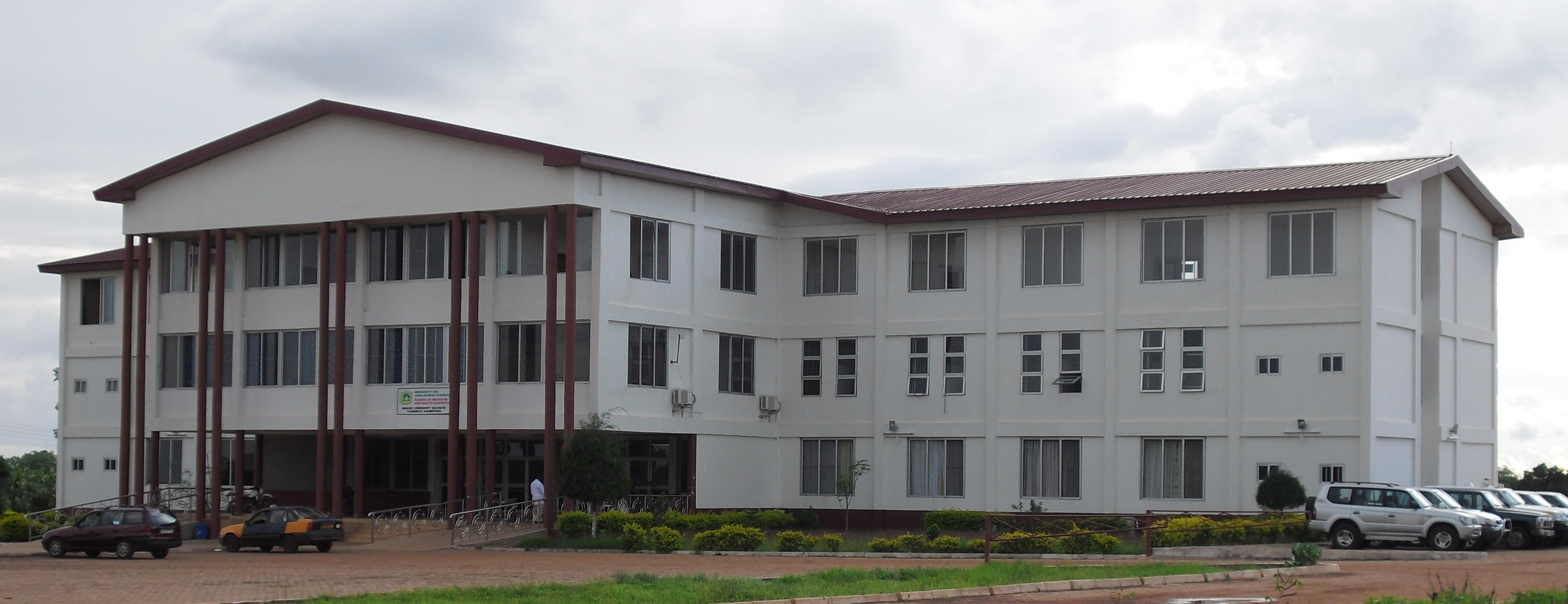
- The University for Development Studies
- Motto: Knowledge for Service
- Type: Public
- Established: 1992; 34 years ago
- Chairman: Professor Wayo Seini.
- Chancellor: Vacant
- Vice-Chancellor: Professor Seidu Al-hassan
- Location: Tamale, Northern Region, Ghana
- Campus: Urban area (Tamale, Nyankpala)
- Colours: Black, Mantis, Green and White
- Website: www.uds.edu.gh

The University for Development Studies, popularly known as UDS, was established in 1992 as a multi-campus higher education institution with its central administration at Tamale. It is the fifth public university to be established in Ghana. This deviates from the usual practice of having universities with central campuses and administrations. It was created with the four northern regions of the country in mind. These are the Brong Ahafo Region, Northern Region, Upper East Region and the Upper West Region. The Wa and Navrongo campuses were later converted into autonomous Universities.

== History ==
The University for Development Studies (UDS) is a public university located in Tamale, in the Northern Region of Ghana. It consistently ranks as one of the top four universities in the country. Established in 1992 by the Government of Ghana, its purpose is to accelerate the development of Ghana's north, and the broader nation. The legislative instrument that founded the university is PNDC Law 279, which was gazetted on May 15, 1992, but recently repealed to UDS Act, 2025(Act 1134). UDS is the fifth public university established by the Government of Ghana. The university has two main campuses: Nyankpala and Dungu in Tamale.

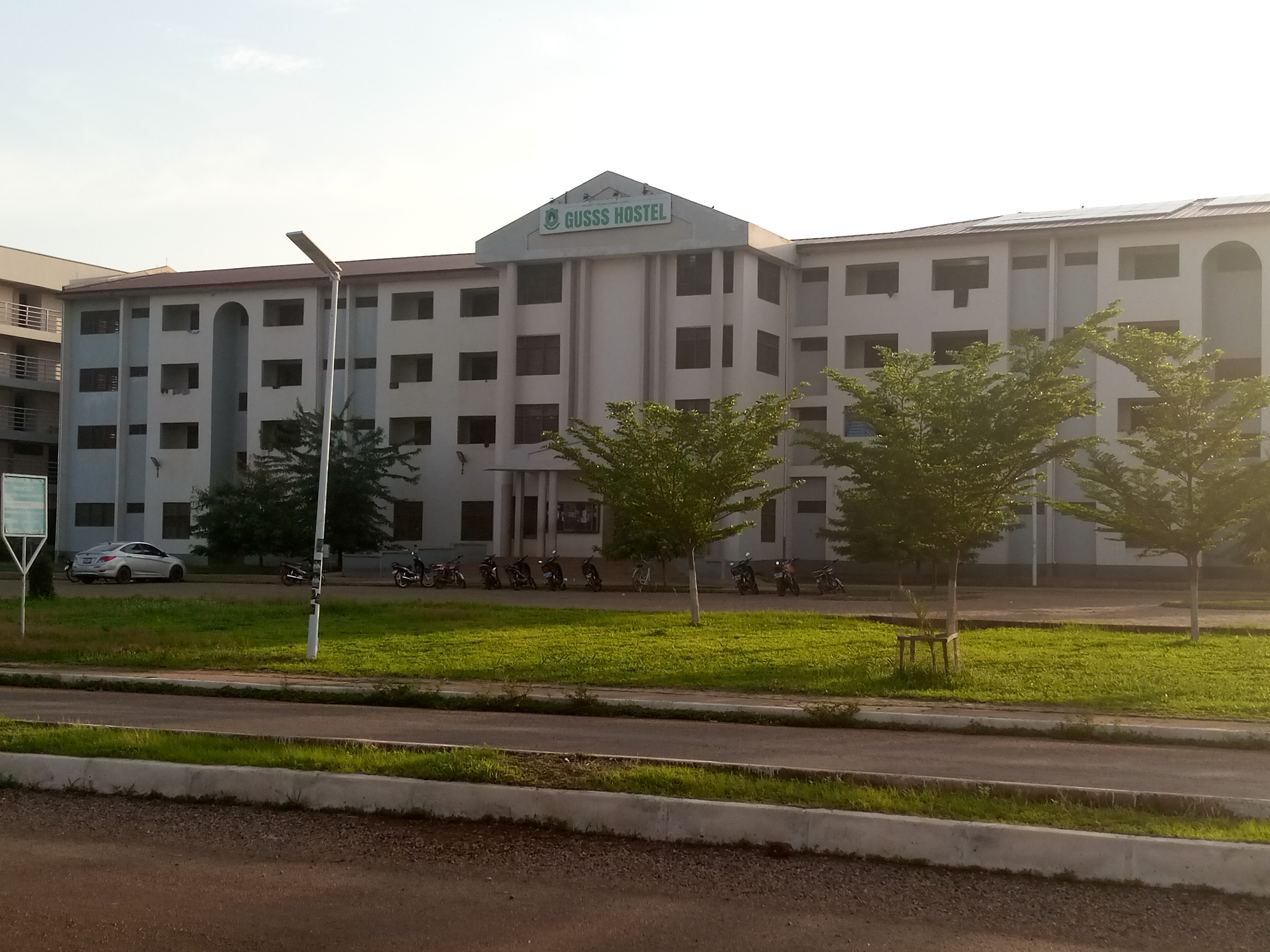
Yaa Naa Hall, formerly GUSS Hostel, Tamale.

The university incorporates the Third Trimester Field Practical Programme (TTFPP) into its curriculum for first and second-year students. This program provides students with practical exposure to real-world development challenges within communities, fostering problem-solving skills. UDS students annually spend about two months residing in communities, actively engaging in hands-on experiences that contribute to a nuanced understanding of applied knowledge and the development of innovative solutions. This aspect sets UDS apart within the Ghanaian academic landscape, promoting a distinctive approach to development studies. The University for Development Studies introduced bachelor's degree in Law which open for applicants for the 2025/26 academic year.

== Campuses ==
=== Tamale Campus ===
The campus houses the Central Administration, School of Medicine (SoM), School of Allied Health Sciences (SAHS), School of Nursing and Midwifery (SoNM), School of Public Health (SPH) and Faculty of Education (FoE) and Desert Research Institute (DRI).

=== Tamale City Campus ===
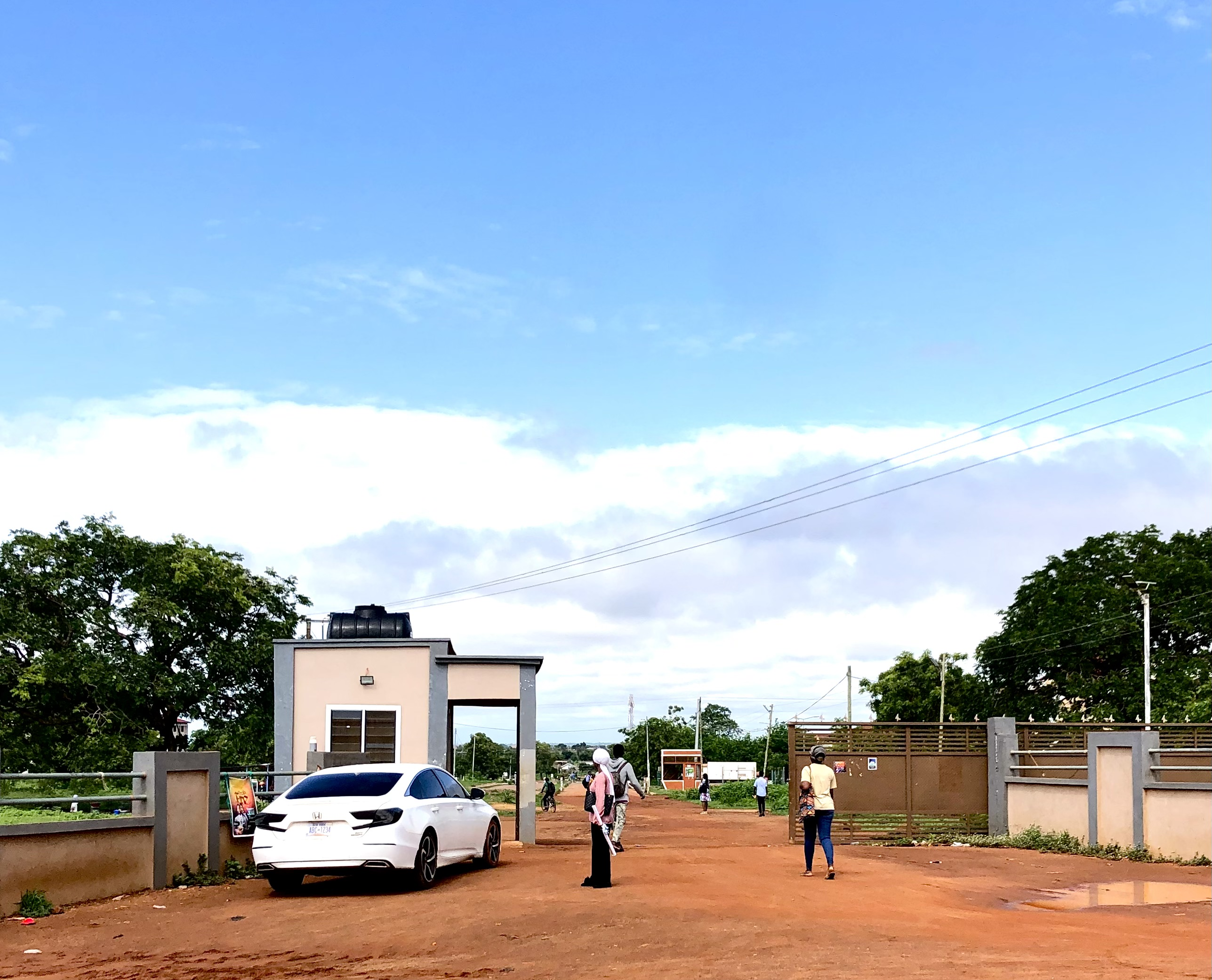
UDS second gate

Tamale City Campus is a centre for the following: School of Business, Graduate School, Institute of Interdisciplinary Research (IIR), Institute of Distance and Continuing Education (IDCE), Colleges of Education Affiliation and Business Innovation and Incubation Centre (BIIC).

=== Nyankpala Campus ===
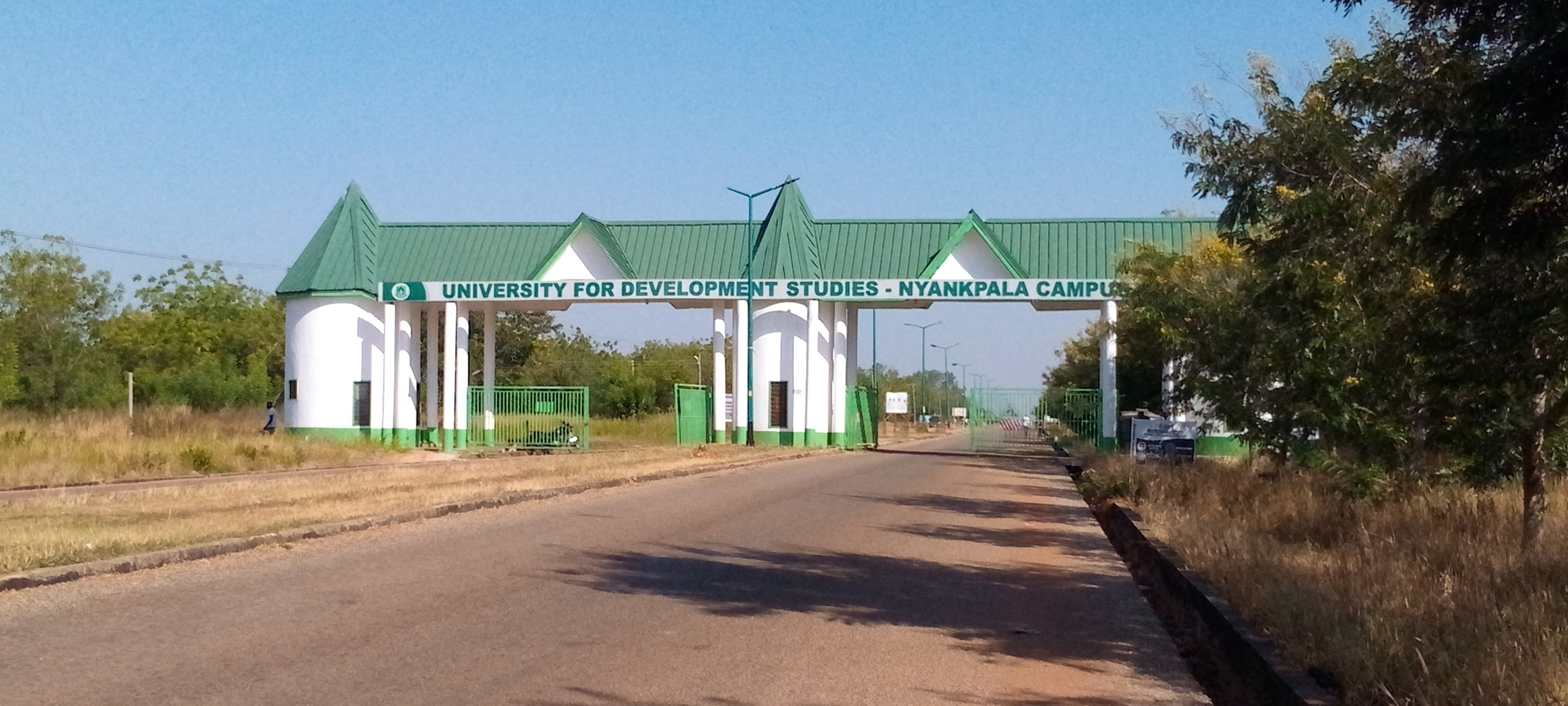
Entrance of UDS Nyankpala Campus.

The following are located at Nyankpala Campus: Faculty of Agriculture, Food and Consumer Sciences (FoAFCS), Faculty of Natural Resources and Environment (FNRE), Faculty of Biosciences (FoB), School of Engineering (SoE), Faculty of Physical Science (FOPS), Faculty of Communication and Media Studies (FCMS), Faculty of Social Sciences (FOSS), School Economics (SoEc), School of Veterinary Sciences (SoVS), West African Centre for Water, Irrigation and Sustainable Agriculture (WACWISA) and West African Centre for Sustainable Rural Transformation (WAC-SRT).

=== Tamale North Campus ===
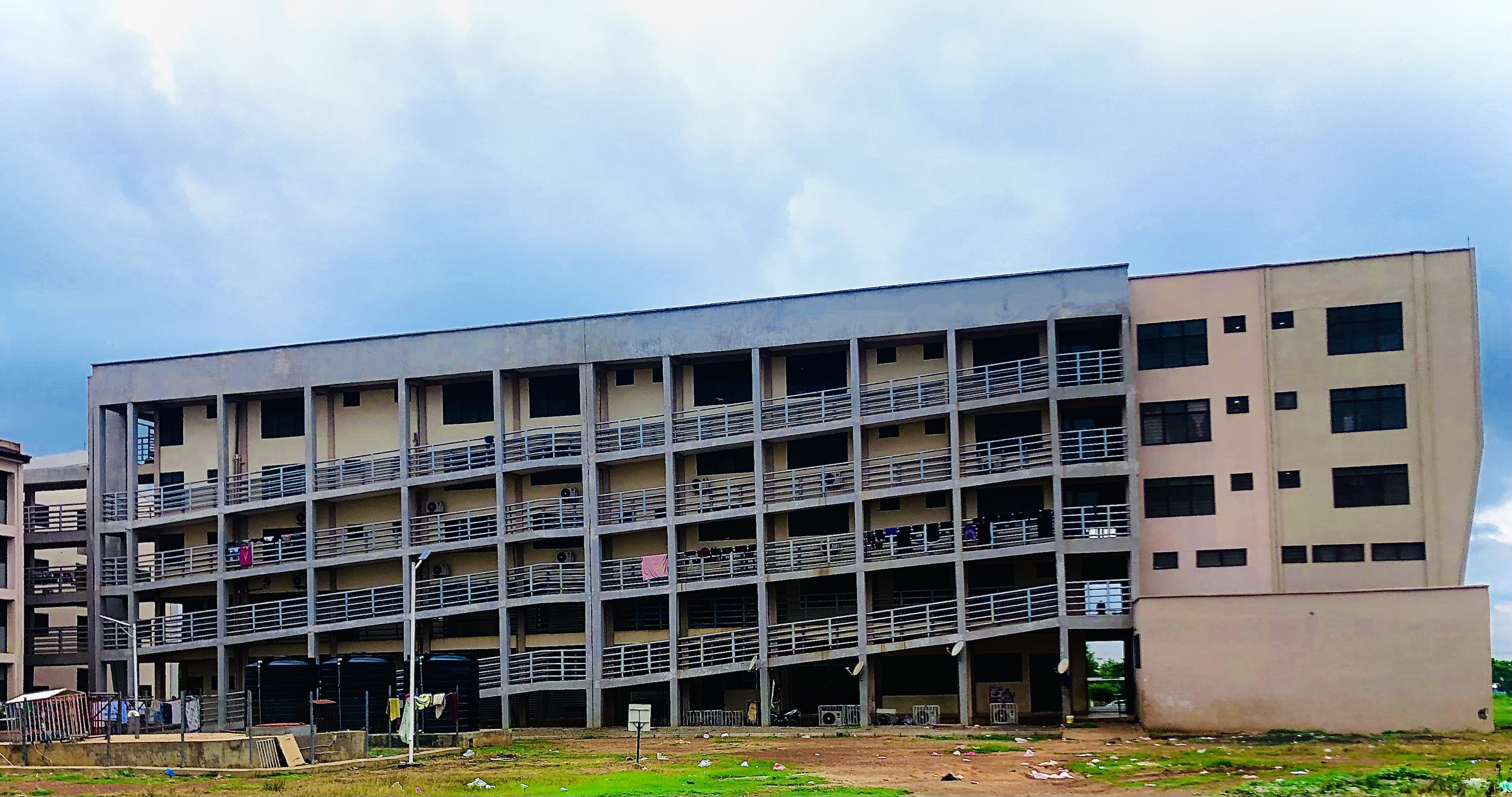

The Campus is site for School of Applied Economics and Management Sciences (SAEMS).

=== Eastern Campus, Yendi ===
Eastern Campus is a site for Faculty of Communication and Cultural Studies (FCCS) and Faculty of Sustainable Development Studies (FoSDS), Centre for Culture, Heritage and African Studies (CCHAS) and Centre for Peace and Security Studies (CePSS).

== Schools/Faculties ==
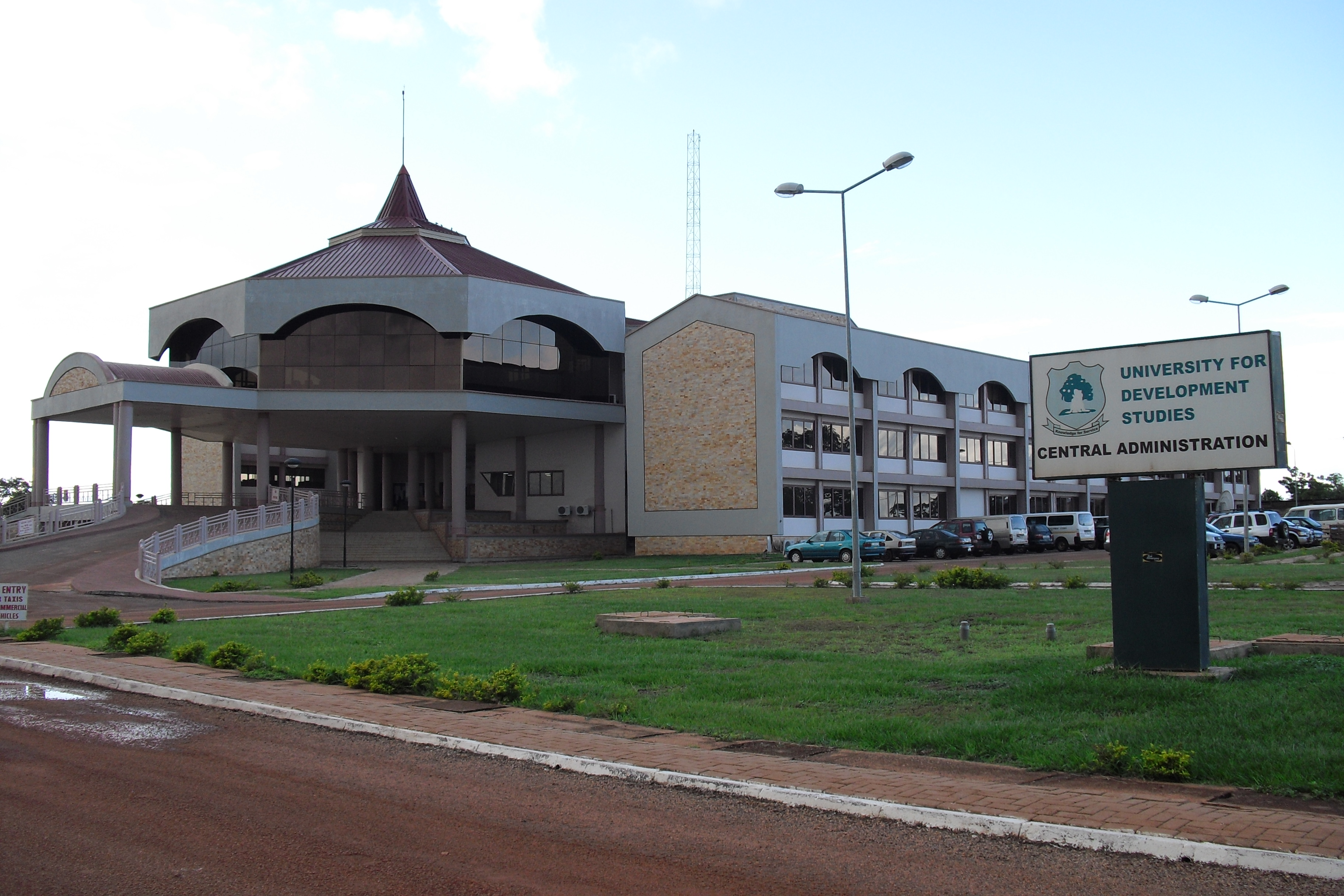
Entrance of the Central Administration block

== Faculty of Planning and Land Management ==
- Department of Community Development
- Department of Planning and Management
- Department of Real Estate and Land management

== Faculty of Physical Science ==
- Department of Computer Science
- Department of Mathematics
- Department of Statistics
- Department of Computing Mathematics

== Faculty of social science ==
- Sociology and social work Department
- Political science department
- History Department

== Faculty of Agriculture ==
- Department of Agricultural Mechanization and Irrigation Technology
- Department of Agricultural Extension and Farm Management
- Department of Agronomy
- Department of Animal Science
- Department of Biotechnology
- Department of Consumer Sciences & Agricultural Education
- Department of Horticulture

== Faculty of Natural Resources and Environment ==
- Department of Forestry and Forest Resources Management
- Department of Fisheries and Aquatic Resources Management
- Department of Biodiversity Conservation and Management
- Department of Environment and Sustainability
- Department of Ecotourism and Resort Management

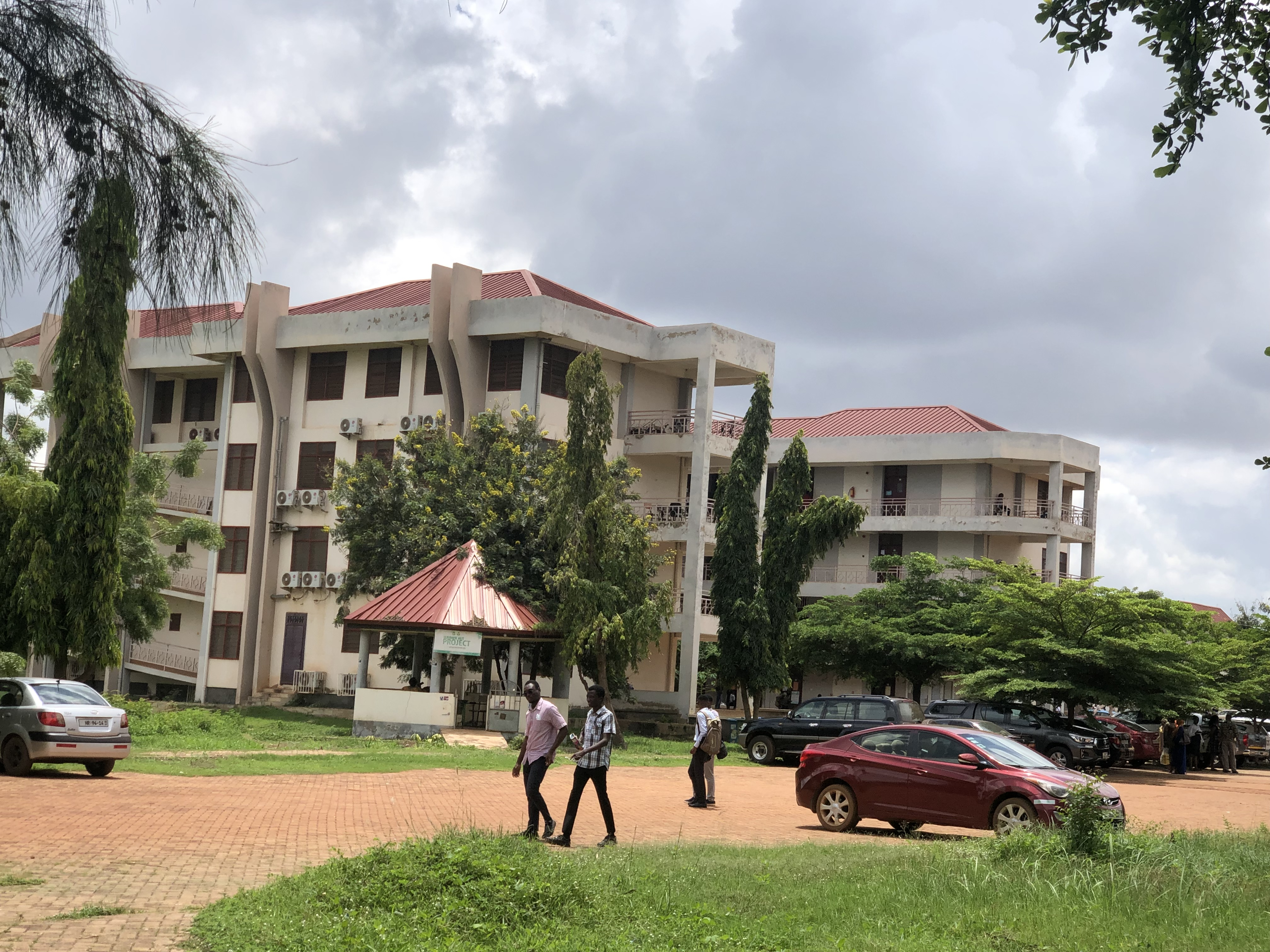

== School of Allied Health Sciences ==
- Department of Clinical Chemistry
- Department of Dietetics
- Department of Haematology
- Department of Histology and Histotechnology
- Department of Immunology and Immunodiagnostics
- Department of Infectious Diseases
- Department of Medical Physics and Imaging
- Department of Nutritional Sciences

=== The following Programmes are offered ===
- Undergraduate
  - 4-Year BSc (Community Nutrition)
  - 6-Year Doctor of Medical Laboratory Sciences (MLS.D) Sandwich Post-Graduate
  - 4-Year BSc Medical Imaging Technology
  - MSc./MPhil in Community Health and Development (Modular)
  - MSc./MPhil in Public Health Nutrition (Modular)

== School of Nursing and midwifery ==
=== Departments under the School ===
- Department of Advanced Nursing Practice
- Department of General Nursing
- Department of Mental Health Nursing
- Department of Midwifery and Women's Health
- Department of Paediatric Nursing
- Department of Preventive Health Nursing

=== Programmes offered ===
- 4-Year BSc (Nursing)
- 2-Year Top-up BSc (Nursing)
- 4-Year BSc (Midwifery)
- 2-Year Top-up BSc (Midwifery)
- 3-Year Matured Regular BSc (Nursing)
- 3-Year Matured BSc (Midwifery)
- 4-Year Access BSc (Midwifery)
- 3-Year Matured Sandwich BSc (Nursing)
- 3-Year BSc (Nurse Practitioner)

== Faculty of Applied Sciences ==
- Department of Applied Biology
- Department of Applied Chemistry & Biochemistry
- Department of Applied Physics

== Faculty of Mathematical Sciences ==
- Department of Mathematics
- Department of Computer Science
- Department of Statistics

== Faculty of Earth and Environmental Sciences ==
- Department of Earth and Geological Sciences
- Department of Environmental Science

== Faculty of Integrated Development ==
- Department of Economics & Entrepreneurship Development
- Department of Environmental & Resource Studies
- Department of Social, Political & Historical Studies
- Department of Planning, Land Economy and Rural Development
- Department of Communication studies
- Department of Business Studies

== School of Medicine and Health Sciences ==
The first batch of students were admitted in 1996

- Department of Biochemistry & Molecular Medicine
- Department of Community Nutrition
- Department of Microbiology
- Department of Pharmacology
- Department of Community Health and Family Medicine
- Department of Physiology & Surgery

== Faculty of Education ==
- Department of Development Education Studies
- Department of Basic Education Studies
- Department of Educational Foundation Studies
- Department of social and Business Studies
- Mathematics and ICT

== Faculty of Horticulture ==
To be established at the University for Development Studies

== Directorates ==
- Directorate of Finance
- Directorate of Academic Planning and Quality Assurance
- Directorate of International Relations and Advancement
- Directorate of Estates
- Directorate of ICT
- Directorate of Internal Audit
- Directorate of Works and Physical Development
- Directorate of Community Relations and Outreach Programmes (DCROP)
- Directorate of Procurement
- Directorate of Health Services
- Directorate of Sports
- Directorate of Colleges of Education Affiliation
- Direcrotate of Diagnostic Imaging and Research Center

== Campuses ==
- Nyankpala, Northern Region, Ghana – houses the Faculty of Agriculture, Faculty of Renewable Natural Resources, Faculty of Agribusiness and Communication Sciences, Faculty of Physical Science and the School of Engineering.
- Tamale City Campus is a centre for the following: Graduate School, Institute of Interdisciplinary Research (IIR), Institute of Distance and Continuing Education (IDCE), Colleges of Education Affiliation and Business Innovation and Incubation Centre (BIIC).
- Tamale Campus, Dungu, Northern Region, Ghana – houses the School of Medicine and Health Sciences, School of Allied Health Sciences, School of Public health and The Faculty of Education

== Third trimester field practical programme ==
For the Third Trimester Practical Programme (TTFPP) the whole of the third trimester is devoted to practical field work in the local communities. Students of a given year group identify a specific region, and in smaller groups live and interact with the people in the local communities during each third trimester for a period of three years. The programme began in 1993. It entails the combination of students from all the faculties: Agriculture, Integrated Development Studies; Applied Science, Engineering, Business, Economics, Medicine, Allied Health Sciences etc.

== Awards ==
Africa University Games FASU (All-Africa University Games): 2024, 2026

Universities Football World Cup: 2025

Award Winners At The 24th Congregation Ceremony

SWAG football personality of the year award (2025)

== List of vice chancellors ==
- Prof. R.B Bening Pioneer Vice Chancellor (1992–2001)
- Prof G.W.K Mensah (Acting Vice Chancellor) (2001–2002)
- Prof. John Bonaventure Kubongpwa Kaburise (April 8, 2002 – April 7, 2007)
- Prof. Nokoe (Acting Vice Chancellor) (April 2007 – 30 June 2010)
- Prof. Haruna Yakubu (June 1, 2010 – 2015)
- Prof. Gabriel Ayum Teye (October 1, 2015 – 2022)
- Prof. Seidu Al-hassan (September 1, 2022 –2026)
- Prof. Mohammed Muniru Iddrisu (June 27, 2026 – August 31, 2030)

== See also ==
- List of universities in Ghana

== Sources ==
- Universities of Ghana Overseas Office
- Ghanaweb.com
- Official UDS website
