= Ankaful =

Coordinates: 5°12′N 1°02′W

- Town
- Interactive map of Ankaful
- Country: Ghana
- Region: Central Region

Ankaful is the name of two towns in the Central Region of Ghana.

== Two towns ==
One is under the jurisdiction of the Cape Coast Metropolitan Assembly where the institutions listed below are located. The town is known for:

- The Ankaful Psychiatric Hospital
- The Ankaful Maximum Security Prison
- The Ankaful Leprosy General Hospital
- Ankaful Leprosy Camp

The other one can be found at Saltpond under the Mfanteman district Assembly.
