= Rashid Bawa =

Ghanaian politician and diplomat (1940–2024)

Former Amb. Rashid Bawa

Former Ambassador in Nigeria
- In office June 2017 – 14 March 2024
- President: Nana Akuffo-Addo
- Succeeded by: Baba Jamal

Member of Parliament for Akan Constituency
- In office January 2001 – January 2005
- President: John Agyekum Kufour
- Preceded by: John Kwadwo Gyapong
- Succeeded by: John Kwadjo Gyampong

Personal details
- Born: 2 April 1940 Gold Coast
- Died: 14 March 2024 (aged 83) Abuja, Nigeria
- Party: New Patriotic Party

Rashid Bawa (2 April 1940 – 14 March 2024) was a Ghanaian politician, diplomat and a member of the New Patriotic Party of Ghana. He was Ghana's ambassador to Nigeria until his death on 14 March 2024.

Bawa had previously served as Ghana's ambassador to Saudi Arabia. He was a former Member of Parliament.

Bawa was the member of parliament for Akan Constituency of the Republic of Ghana from 7 January 2001 to 6 January 2005, as an independent.

== Ambassadorial appointment ==
In June 2017, President Nana Akuffo-Addo named Rashid Bawa as Ghana's ambassador to Nigeria. He was among eight other distinguished Ghanaians who were named to head various diplomatic Ghanaian missions in the world.

== Personal life and death ==
Rashid Bawa was born on 2 April 1940. He was a lawyer and the first magistrate of Pokuase in Greater Accra.

Bawa died in Abuja, Nigeria on 14 March 2024, at the age of 83. His body was flown to Kadjebi in the Oti Region of Ghana for burial. He left behind a wife and three children.

== Politics ==
Bawa was an independent candidate in the 3rd Parliament of the 4th Parliament of the 4th Republic of Ghana. He was elected as the member of parliament for the Akan constituency in the Volta region in the 3rd parliament of the 4th republic of Ghana.

Bawa was elected as the member of parliament for the Akan constituency in the 2000 Ghanaian general elections. He was an independent candidate for the said elections.

His constituency was the second independent candidate to win the said election in the Volta Region. He was elected with 12,306 votes out of 22,533 total valid votes cast.

This was equivalent to 54.9% of the total valid votes cast. He was elected over John K. Gyapong of the National Democratic Congress, Kofi Asiedu-Mensah of the New Patriotic Party, Gibson-Godfried Akromah of the Convention People's Party and Peter K.E. Ansah of the National Reformed Party.

These obtained 9,386, 536, 196 and 0 votes respectively out of the total valid votes cast. These were equivalent to 41.9%, 2.4%, 0.9% and 0% respectively of total valid votes cast.

He was the Deputy Minister for Education. He was the Minister of State for Ministry of Education Science and Sports.
