= Kadjebi =

- District Capital
- Location in Ghana
- Coordinates: 7°31′39″N 0°28′33″E
- Country: Ghana
- Region: Oti Region
- District: Kadjebi District
- Elevation: 209 m (686 ft)
- Time zone: GMT
  - Summer (DST): GMT

Kadjebi is a prominent town and the administrative capital of the Kadjebi District, a district in the Oti Region of Ghana. It serves as an economic hub for the surrounding farming communities. The town is the seat of the Kadjebi-Akan Traditional Area, headed by Paramount Chief Nana Ogyeabour Akompi Finam II.

== History ==
The people of Kadjebi are of Akan descent. According to oral tradition, they migrated from the Ashanti Kingdom, specifically tracing their ancestral roots to Asante Mampong in the present-day Ashanti Region.

== Culture and festivals ==
Kadjebi maintain a rich culture heritage centered on Akan traditions through the observance of key festivals:

- Dawuro Kese Festival
- Akwasidae Festival
- Adae Kese Festival

== Location ==
Kadjebi is located in the middle part of the Oti Region and not far from the Ghana-Togo international border.
