= Ghana Prisons Service =

Ghanaian government agency

Official logo of the Ghana Prisons Service.

The Ghana Prisons Service (GPS) is a government security and correctional agency responsible for the safe custody, welfare, reformation, rehabilitation, and reintegration of persons lawfully committed into prison custody in Ghana. It operates under the jurisdiction of the Ministry of the Interior and forms of Ghana's criminal justice system.

== Administration ==
The Ghana Prisons Service is administered under the supervision of the Ministry of Interior. The service is governed by the Prisons Service Council, an advisory and supervisory body. Its functions include advising the President on "matters of policy in relation to the organization and maintenance of the prisons system in Ghana''.

The prison is headed by the Director-General of Prisons, who serves as the chief executive officer and who is responsible for the overall administration, strategic planning, operational management, and implementation of government policies relating to corrections and rehabilitation. The Director-General is supported by the Deputy Directors-General, the Directors of Prison, Regional Commanders, and other Senior Officers who oversee policy implementation, prison security, inmate welfare, rehabilitation programs, logistics, finance, training, and human resource management.

The Prisons Headquarters in the Greater Accra region houses the Director-General of Prisons and two Deputy Director-General of Prisons, Nine Directors of Prisons and other principal office holders. Since March 2025, the Director-General of the Ghana Prisons Service has been Patience Baffoe-Bonnie, who succeeded Isaac Kofi Egyir following her appointment by President John Dramani Mahama. She became the second woman to lead the Ghana Prisons Service. In July 2025, the Minister for Interior inaugurated a new Ghana Prisons Service Council to provide policy strategic policy direction and support institutional development aimed at strengthening correctional administration, staff welfare, and inmate rehabilitation.

== Legal Mandate ==
The Ghana Prisons Service derives its legal mandate from the 1992 constitution of Ghana, the Prisons Service Act, 1972(NRCD 46), and other legislation laws and regulations governing prison administration. Its mandate includes safe custody of prisoners, the protection of their welfare, their reformation and rehabilitation, and preparation of inmates for reintegration into society. Constitutional provisions relating to the rights of detained persons and judicial review of remand cases also influence prison administration and ongoing justice-sector reforms. Beyond maintaining secure custody, the service works to treat inmates humanely, in accordance with national legislation and internationally recognized human rights standards.

== Prisons ==
There are 49 prison establishments in Ghana, including twelve major male prisons. These male prisons are located in Akuse, Kumasi, Sekondi, Tamale, Nsawam, Ho, Sunyani, Navrongo, Wa, Tarkwa, Winneba, and Cape Coast. The country also has seven major female prisons, located in Akuse, Ho, Nsawam, Sekondi, Sunyani, Kumasi, and Tamale. In addition, there are local prisons sited throughout the country. The James Camp Prison near Accra, and Ankaful near Cape Coast, are both Open Camp Prisons. Ghana's prisons house between 11,000 and 14,000 inmates, with females forming approximately 2% of the prison population.

Prisons in Ghana are classified based on their level of security, and on the activities undertaken at the various establishments. Prison establishment in Ghana includes Central prison, local prisons, female prisons, juvenile correctional centers, and open Camp Prison. Open Camp Prisons such as the James Camp Prison and Ankaful Open Camp Prison are designed to facilitate rehabilitation of selected low-risk inmates through agricultural activities, vocational training and other productive work programs intended to prepare them for reintegration into society. The Ghana Prison Service also operate prison farms and prison industries as part of its rehabilitation and skills development initiatives.

1. In the Central Prisons, trade training facilities are provided to equip prisoners with employable skills for their effective reintegration into society. They take custody of long-sentenced prisoners. Central Prisons are the central points for all categories of prisoners, with the exception of condemned prisoners.
2. Local Prisons are mainly responsible for the safe custody and welfare of inmates, due to the lack of space for trade training activities. They usually take custody of short-sentenced prisoners.
3. Open Camp Prisons undertake agricultural activities to provide food and train inmates in modern agricultural practices. Prisoners who are about to be released are at times transferred to these facilities as transit to prepare them for their final release into society.
4. In Agricultural Settlement Camps, the level of security is quite relaxed; they are usually not fenced. The main objective is to train inmates in agricultural activities, and to produce enough food to supplement the feeding of inmates and generate some income for the Prisons Service.

== Staff ==
The Ghana Prisons Service has 6,200 officers and staff. Twenty percent of the staff are women. In 2017 the staff strength of the service was 5,898. In recent years, the Ghana Prisons Service has continued to strengthen its workforce through regular recruitment, professional training, and career development programs. The service has also encouraged greater gender inclusion and enhanced the capacity of prison officers through specialized training in correctional administration, human rights, inmate rehabilitation, and prison security.

== Prison conditions ==
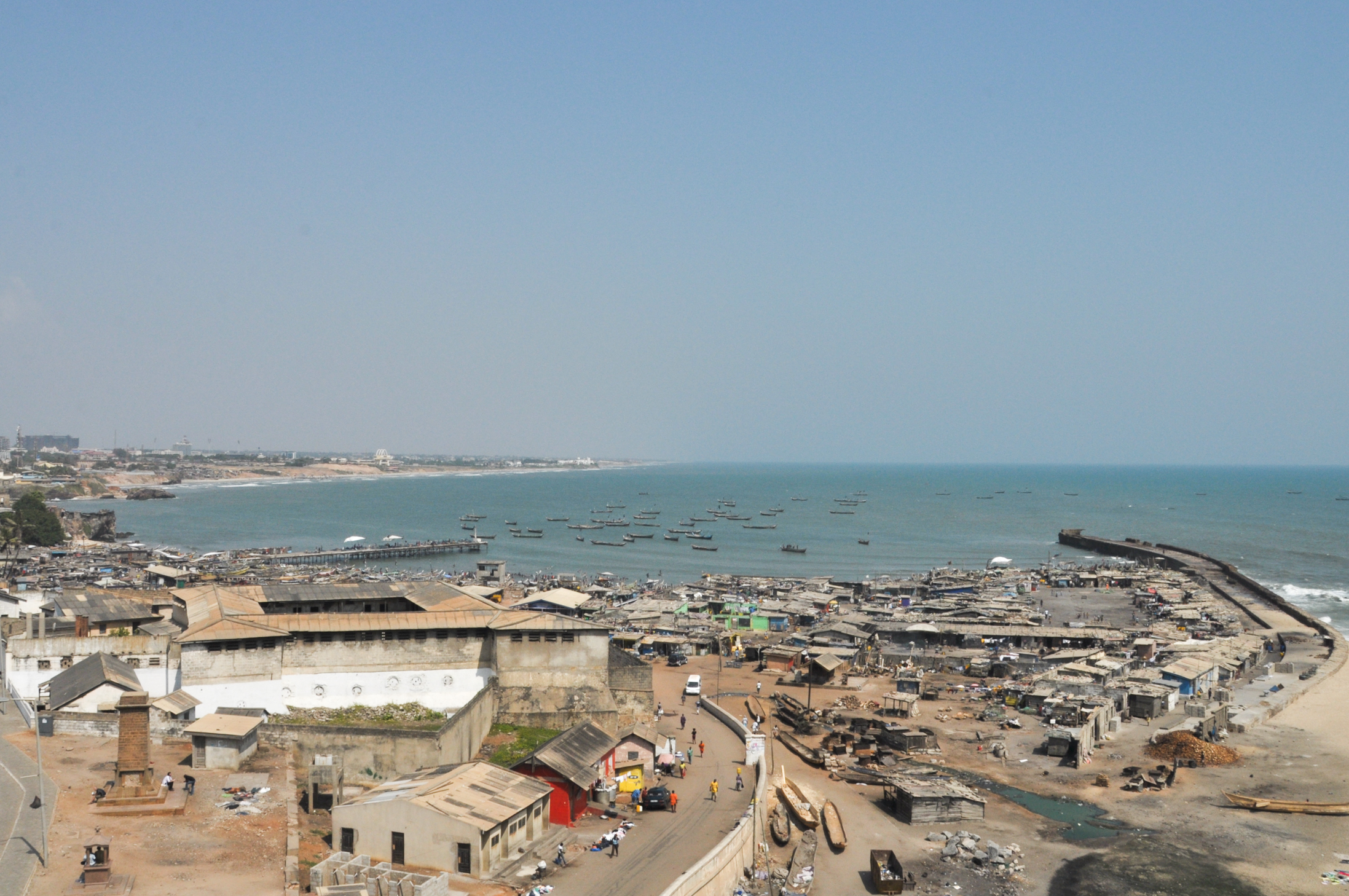
James Fort Prison, Accra (far left).

The main challenge that confronts the service is a persistent lack of funds. One effect of this, evident since 1972, is that the service is unable to ensure that convicts do not reoffend. Other challenges that face the service include prison overcrowding, lack of sanitation, and poor prison infrastructure. Some of the prisons are extremely outdated. For example, the almost 400 years old James Fort Prison in Accra was in use as a prison until 2008. It was originally built for 200 slaves, housed over 740 male and female prisoners.

1. Insufficient budget allocation for Reformation Programs – prisoners are generally unskilled and unmotivated as they enter prison. There are many deficiencies to be corrected, and funding is needed for the programs to be effective.
2. Poor accommodation structures – old and weak structures and poor architectural designs unsuitable for long detention of people. Overcrowding often leads to poor sanitation and health problems.
3. Stigmatization of prisoners – stigmatization of prisoners leads to dejection and reoffending which lead to recidivism and high crime rate undermines efforts of reformation and rehabilitation of prisons.
4. Lack of support from public to reform and reintegrate prisoners after their release.

Despite the ongoing reforms, overcrowding remains a challenge for the Ghana Prison Service. According to Ghanaian Times, Ghana's prison was holding approximately 4,972 more inmates than their certified capacity, placing significant pressure on accommodation, healthcare, sanitation and food services. Overcrowding has also affected the delivery of rehabilitation programs and prison management. The Ghana Prisons Service has continued to identify inadequate funding, ageing infrastructure and limited logistical resources as key challenges affecting prison administration. The world Prison Brief reported that Ghana's prison system had an official capacity of 10,265 but housed 14,133 inmates in 2025, representing an occupancy rate of approximately 138%.

The Ghana Prisons Service has continued to implement measures aimed at improving prison conditions through infrastructure rehabilitation, healthcare services, sanitation improvements, vocational training, and rehabilitation programs. The service works with the Government of Ghana, development partners, and civil society organizations to address prison overcrowding, improve inmate welfare, and promote rehabilitation and successful reintegration into society.

=== Healthcare and Nutrition ===
Healthcare and nutrition remain areas of concern within Ghana's prisons. Overcrowding has increased pressure on prison health services and sanitation facilities, while limited financial resources have affected the provision of adequate food and medical care. The Ghana Prisons Service continues to work with government institutions and developing partners to improve healthcare delivery, nutrition and inmates' welfare.

== Rehabilitation Programmes ==
The Ghana Prisons Service implements rehabilitation programs intended to prepare inmates for successful reintegration into society. These include vocational training in carpentry, tailoring, masonry, welding, mechanics, electric installation and agriculture. Educational programmes enable inmates to sit for national examinations, while agricultural settlement camps provide practical farming experience and contribute to food production for correctional facilities. The service also collaborates with government agencies and development partners to expand rehabilitation and skills-development initiatives. In 2025, the Director-General of the Ghana Prisons Service stated that prison agricultural projects provide approximately 40% of inmates' daily food requirements in 2025, while hundreds of inmates participate in academic and vocational training programs designed to improve their employability and support successful reintegration into society. These rehabilitation initiatives are intended to reduce recidivism, promote self-reliance, and facilitate the social and economic reintegration of former inmates after their release.

== Human rights issues ==
Squalid conditions, poor food and overcrowding in Ghana's prisons were called "cruel, inhuman and degrading treatment," by the UN in 2013. The extent of prison overcrowding is estimated to be higher than the government's official figures. Prison authorities use a system where inmates known as "black coats" whip other misbehaving prisoners with canes.

Human rights organizations and international bodies have continued to express concern about conditions in some prison facilities in Ghana. Key issues include overcrowding, inadequate infrastructure, and insufficient resources to meet the welfare needs of inmates. These conditions have been attributed in part to the high number of remand prisoners and ageing prison infrastructure.

In recent years, the Ghana Prisons Service has undertaken reforms aimed at improving prison conditions and protecting the rights of inmates. These include strengthening rehabilitation and reintegration programmes, improving healthcare services, expanding vocational and educational opportunities, and collaborating with international partners such as the United Nations Office on Drugs and Crime (UNODC) to promote prison management in line with the United Nations Standard Minimum Rules for the Treatment of Prisoners (the Nelson Madela Rules).

Despite these reforms, overcrowding remains a significant challenge in some prison establishments, and government agencies and development partners continue to support initiatives aimed at improving prison infrastructure, inmate welfare, and access to justice.

== Training ==
Training of prison officers is done at the Prisons Service Training School. The school was established as the Warders' Training Depot in September,1947. The purpose of the school is to train the Ghanaians to meet the administrative and operational needs of the Ghana Prisons Service. There are courses for recruits, officer cadet and special courses. The school admitted its first cadet officers 1974. In addition to the recruitment and cadet officer training, the Prisons Service Training School provides continuous professional development programs for serving officers. Training covers prison security, inmate management, correctional administration, human right, leadership, emergency response, rehabilitation practices and management of correctional facilities. The Ghana Prisons Service also collaborates with local and international organizations to strengthen staff capacity through specialized training and technical assistant programs.

== Statistics ==
As of 2015, Patrick Darko Missah the then Deputy Controller in charge of Finance and Administration of the Ghana Prisons Service, reported that there were 14, 585 inmates, comprising 11,581 convicted prisoners and 3,004 remand prisoners. At the time, the inmate's population exceeded the official prison capacity, and many prison facilities were operating in buildings originally constructed for the purpose-built prisons. This was due to the fact that apart from Nsawam Medium Security Prisons, Ankaful, and the Kete Krachi Prisons which were purpose built, all other prisons were makeshifts from warehouses, stores, and silos among others, meant to house goods.

As of 2 March 2026, the Ghana Prisons Service reported a total inmate population of 13,620, comprising 11,875 convicted prisoners (87.19%) and 1,745 remand prisoners (12.81%). The reduction in proportion of remand prisoners has been attributed to reforms implemented through the Justice for All Programme (JFAP), which has sought to reduce prolonged pre-trial detention through in-prison court sittings and improved collaboration among justice-sector institutions. According to Justice Afia Serwaa Asare Botwe, the remand population has declined from 30.57% in 2007 to 12.18% in 2026, reflecting sustained judicial and institutional reforms.

According to the World Prison Brief, women accounted for 221 inmates (1.6%) of Ghana's total prison population in 2025. The female prison population has remained a relatively small proportion of the overall prison population over the years, fluctuating between approximately 1% and 2% of all the inmates. The World Prison Brief also reported that Ghana's pre-trial (remand) population stood at 1,607 inmates, representing 11.4% of total prison population in 2025. This reflects a decline compared with earlier years, when remand prisoners accounted for significantly larger share of the prison population.

== United Nations support ==
The United Nations Development Programme (UNDP) is supporting the reorganization of the Ghana Prisons Service under a four-year project, focusing on human rights development. As part of the restructuring, the Borstal Institute for Juveniles is now called the Senior Correctional Centre.

The United Nations Development Programme (UNDP) and the United Nations Office on Drugs and Crime (UNODC) continue to support reforms within the Ghana Prisons Service through programs aimed at improving access to justice, prison management, rehabilitation, and compliance with the United Nation Standard Minimum Rules for Treatment of Prisoners (the Nelson Mandela Rule) . Recent initiatives have included training prison staff as paralegals to improve inmates' access to legal services within prisons, and technical assistance to strengthen prison management, inmate classification, healthcare, and rehabilitation programmes. The United Nations has also supported efforts to strengthen human rights protections, improve prison conditions, and promote rehabilitation and successful reintegration of inmates into society through collaboration with the Ghana Prisons Service and other justice-sector institutions.

== Leadership ==
Director-General	Years
Patrick Darko Missah	2017-2021
Isaac Kofi Egyir	2021-2025
Patience Baffoe-Bonnie	2025-current

== Recent Development ==
In 2026, the Ghana Prisons Service reported a continued decline in the proportion of remand prisoners following reforms implemented under the Justice for all programme. During an in-prison court sitting held at Koforidua Local Prison, judicial authorities reported that the remand population had fallen to 12.81% of the total prison population. The reforms have included expanded in-person court sittings, improved coordination among justice-sector institutions and greater emphasis on timely case management. The Judiciary has also introduced additional training for judges on bail and remand procedures to reduce prolonged pre-trial detention.

== See also ==
- Ministry of Interior (Ghana)
- Borstal Institute for Juveniles
