= Kadjebi District =

- District
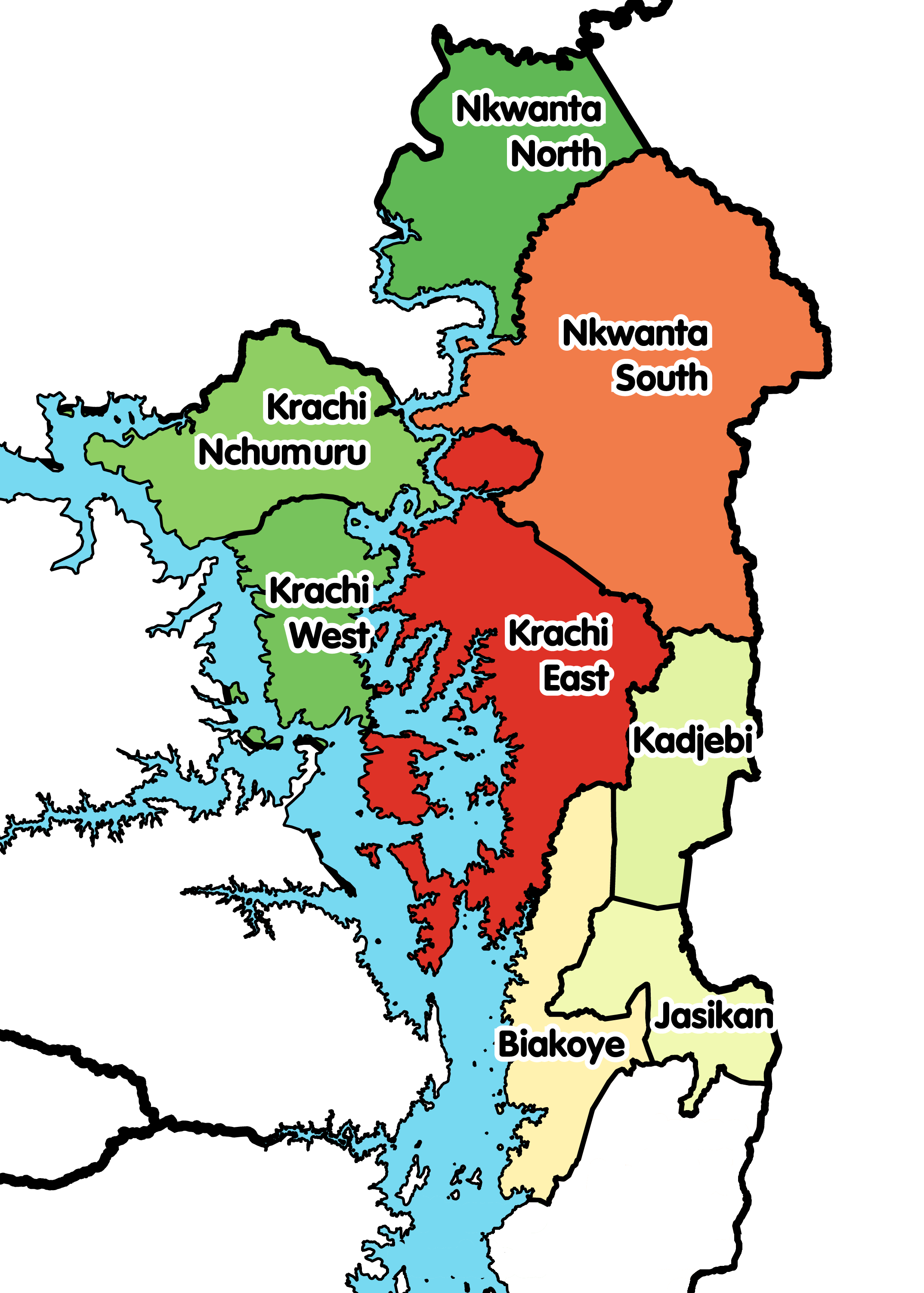
- Districts of Oti Region

- Location of Kadjebi District within Oti
- Coordinates: 7°31′39.36″N 0°28′32.16″E
- Country: Ghana
- Region: Oti
- Capital: Kadjebi

Government
  - District Executive: Hon. Wilson Kwami Agbanyo

Area
  - Total: 949 km^{2} (366 sq mi)

Population (2021)
  - Total: 73,959
- Time zone: UTC+0 (GMT)
- ISO 3166 code: GH-OT-KJ

Kadjebi District is one of the nine districts in Oti Region, Ghana. Originally created as an ordinary district assembly on 10 March 1989, which was created from the former Jasikan District Council, which it was established by Legislative Instrument (L.I.) 1465. The district assembly is located in the southern part of Oti Region and has Kadjebi as its capital town.
