= List of MPs elected in the 1996 Ghanaian parliamentary election =

Colonial Era
1951 Assembly	(election)
1954 Assembly	(election)
1956 Assembly	(election)
First Republic
1957 Parliament	(election)
1965 Parliament	(election)
Second Republic
1969 Parliament	(election)
Third Republic
1979 Parliament	(election)
Fourth Republic
1st Parliament	(1992)
2nd Parliament	(1996)
3rd Parliament	(2000)
4th Parliament	(2004)
5th Parliament	(2008)
6th Parliament	(2012)
7th Parliament	(2016)
8th Parliament	(2020)
9th Parliament	(2024)

This is a list of members of parliament (MPs) elected to the Parliament of Ghana for the Second Parliament of the Fourth Republic of Ghana at the 1996 parliamentary election, held on 7 December 1996.

The list is arranged by region and constituencies. New MPs elected since the general election and changes in party allegiance are noted at the bottom of the page.

== Composition ==
Affiliation	Members
National Democratic Congress (NDC)	131
New Patriotic Party (NPP)	63
People's Convention Party (PCP)	5
People's National Convention (PNC)	1
Speaker and Deputies	(3)
Total	200
Government Majority	62

== List of MPs elected in the general election ==
The following table is a list of MPs elected on 7 December 1996, ordered by region and constituency. The previous MP and previous party column shows the MP and party holding the seat.

=== Ashanti Region – 33 seats ===
Constituency	Elected MP	Elected Party	Majority	Previous MP	Previous Party
Adansi Asokwa	John Kofi Gyasi	NDC	2,188	John Kofi Gyasi	NDC
Afigya-Sekyere East	Kwesi Akomeah Kyeremateng	NPP	7,266	Pius M G Griffiths	NDC
Afigya-Sekyere West	Albert Kan-Dapaah	NPP	5,536	Mrs. Beatrice Aboagye	NDC
Ahafo Ano North	Baffour Annor	NDC	2,908	George Kwasi Adjei Annim	EGLE
Ahafo Ano South	Stephen Kwaku Balado Manu	NPP	566	Gabriel Barimah	NDC
Amansie West	Anthony Boakye-Yiadom	NPP	13,085	Kofi Amankwaa Peasah	NDC
Asante Akim North	Kwadwo Baah-Wiredu	NPP	16,738	Collins Agyarko Nti	NDC
Asante Akim South	Alex Kwaku Korankye	NPP	1,374		NDC
Asokwa East	Ahmed Musah	NDC	1,940	Othman Baba Yahya	NCP
Asokwa West	Edward Osei-Kwaku	NPP	24,400	Anthony K. Sarpong Kumankuma	NCP
Atwima/Kwanwoma	Matthew Kwaku Antwi	NPP	13,225	Sampson Adu Gyamfi	NDC
Atwima Mponua	Akwasi Dante Afriyie	NPP	3,114		NDC
Atwima Nwabiagya	James Edusei Sarkodie	NPP	20,490	Yaw Bampoh	NDC
Bantama	Richard Winfred Anane	NPP	64,449	Ofori Owusu Jibreel	NDC
Bekwai	Alexander Agyei-Acheampong	NPP	21,012	Oduro Ofrikyi	NDC
Bosome-Freho	Gabriel Yaw Amoah	NPP	2,541		NDC
Bosomtwe	Poku Adu-Gyamfi	NPP	4,267	Josephine Afua Addae-Mensah	EGLE
Effiduase-Asokore	Grace Coleman	NPP	7,231	Samuel Asirifi Adjei	NDC
Ejisu-Juabeng	Akwasi Osei-Adjei	NPP	24,418	Mohammed Boakye-Agyemang	NDC
Ejura Sekyedumasi	Peter Boakye-Ansah	NDC	8,354	Peter Boakye Ansah	NDC
Fomena	Akwasi Afrifa	NPP	8,262	Nana Odame Kusi	NDC
Kumawu	Reo Addai Basoah	NPP	5,698	Jargisu Ibrahim	NDC
Kwabre	Nana Asante Frempong	NPP	22,227	Abena Takyiwa	NDC
Mampong	Solomon Kwabena Sarfoh	NPP	12,981	George Akosa	NDC
Manhyia	Kwame Addo-Kufuor	NPP	45,665	William Kwaku Asante	NDC
New Edubease	Theresa Joyce Baffoe	NDC	11,908	Theresa Joyce Boaffoe	NDC
Nsuta-Kwamang	Kwame Osei-Prempeh	NPP	2,119	Samuel Brenyah	NDC
Obuasi	Anthony Bright Boadi-Mensah	NPP	18,737	Peter Keneth Owusu	NDC
Odotobri	Samuel Nkrumah Gyimah	NPP	10,063	Maxwell Mensah Ebenezer	NCP
Offinso North	Kofi Konadu Apraku	NPP	199	Emmanuel Kwame Boakye	NDC
Offinso South	Francis Kwasi Buor	NPP	7819	Kenneth Amponsah-Yiadom	NDC
Old Tafo Suame	Osei Kyei Mensah Bonsu	NPP	36,627	Nana Kwasi Afful Kingsley	EGLE
Subin	Sampson Kwaku Boafo (Minority Chief Whip)	NPP	27,132	Sarkodie Joseph A. Tuffour	NDC
=== Brong Ahafo Region – 21 seats ===
Constituency	Elected MP	Elected Party	Majority	Previous MP	Previous Party
Asunafo North	David Kwasi Amankwah	NDC	3,278	David Kwasi Amankwaah	NDC
Asunafo South	Francis Adu-Poku	NDC	6,713		
Asutifi North	Emmanuel Baah Danquah	NDC	1,123	Emmanuel Baah Danquah	NDC
Asutifi South	Collins Dauda	NDC	3,646	Collins Dauda	NDC
Atebubu North	David Yaw Mensah	NDC	15,413		
Atebubu South	Amadu Ali	NDC	9,502	Amadu Ali	NDC
Berekum	J. H. Owusu Acheampong	NDC	6,334	J. H. Owusu Acheampong^{(Majority Leader)}	NDC
Dormaa East	Nicholas K. Adjei-Kyeremeh	NDC	1,640	Yaw Oppong Kyekyeku	NCP
Dormaa West	Thomas Kwame Yeboah	NDC	7,363		
Jaman	Nicholas Appiah-Kubi	NDC	14,703		
Kintampo	Gladys Abena Nsoah	NDC	16,202	Kwasi Gyasi Manu	NDC
Nkoranza	Theresa Nyarko-Fofie	NDC	20,120	Thomas Owusu Ansah	NDC
Sene	Nana Yaw Otto	NDC	14,599	Mahama P. Azum	NDC
Sunyani East	Joseph Henry Mensah (Minority Leader)	NPP	6,698	Yaw Manu-Yeboah	NDC
Sunyani West	Kwadwo Adjei Darko	NPP	533	Joseph Gyamfi	NDC
Tano North	Joe Donkor	NPP	376	Dominic Yaw Amoako	NDC
Tano South	Grace Boachie	NDC	3,822	Nana Koduah Kwarteng	NDC
Techiman North	Isaac Kwadwo Adjei Mensah	NDC	6,408		
Techiman South	Kwadwo Mama Adams	NDC	8,630	George Kwabena Owusu	NDC
Wenchi East	Alhaji Moctar Musah Bambah	NPP	1,411	Hayford Osei Kwadwo	NDC
Wenchi West	Johnson Asiedu Nketiah	NDC	5,692	Johnson Asiedu Nketiah	NDC
=== Central Region – 17 seats ===
Constituency	Elected MP	Elected Party	Majority	Previous MP	Previous Party
Abura/Asebu/Kwamankese	J.E. Afful	NDC	7,174	Vincent K Turkson	NCP
Agona East	Kojo Acquah Yankah	NDC	4,731	Kojo Acquah Yankah	NDC
Agona West	Samuel Oppong	NDC	4,642	John Oscar Bimpong	NDC
Ajumako/Enyan/Essiam	Isaac Eduasar Edumadze	NPP	821	Joseph Kweku Enos	NDC
Asikuma-Odoben-Brakwa	Ebenezer Kobina Fosu	NDC	5,882	Jacob Emmanuel Oppong	NCP
Assin North	Florence Kumi	NDC	10,838	Francis K Edzii	NCP
Assin South	Kwaku Al-Hassan Dadzie	NDC	2,457	Kobina Okyere	NDC
Awutu – Senya	Babalami Abu-Sadat	NDC	8,625	Danny William Osardu	NCP
Cape Coast	Christine Churcher	NPP	4,564	Harry Hayford	NDC
Effutu	Mike Allen Hammah	NDC	2,254	R. E.A. Ayirebi-Acquah	NDC
Gomoa East	Thomas Kweku Aubyn	NDC	7,843	Franis Kow Bortsie-Ansah	NDC
Gomoa West	Ama Benyiwa-Doe	NDC	6,638	Mrs. Ama Benyiwa-Doe	NDC
Komenda/Edina/Eguafo/Abbrem	Ato Quarshie	NDC	12,588	Ato Quarshie	NDC
Mfantsiman East	Comfort Owusu (Deputy Majority Whip)	NDC	6,360	David Kwaku Ansah	NDC
Mfantsiman West	Jacob Scherrer Arthur	NDC	16,440	K Abaka-Quansah	NDC
Twifo/Hemang/Lower/Denkyira	John Kweku Kumah	NDC	8,419	John Kweku Kumah	NDC
Upper Denkyira	Clement Charles Omar Nyanor	NPP	4,240	Kwaku Addai-Gyambrah	NDC
=== Eastern Region – 26 seats ===
Constituency	Elected MP	Elected Party	Majority	Previous MP	Previous Party
Abetifi	Eugene Atta Agyepong	NPP	11,790	Opoku Preko	NCP
Abuakwa	Nana Addo Dankwa Akufo-Addo	NPP	8,353	Owraku Amofa	EGLE
Afram Plains North	Krosby Mensah	NDC	14,456	Akuamoah Boateng	NCP
Afram Plains South	Kwakye Addo	NDC	4,655	Akuamoah Asomani	NCP
Akim Oda	Yaw Osafo-Maafo	NPP	9,701	Nana Boaten-Abora	NDC
Akim Swedru	Felix Owusu Adjapong	NPP	3,476	Paul Kofi Peprah	NDC
Akropong	Agyare Koi Larbi	NPP	297	Richie Agyemfra-Kumi	NDC
Akwapim South	Vida Amaadi Yeboah	NDC	3,557	David Adu-Tutu	NCP
Akwatia	Mohammed Erzuah Siam	NDC	9,325	Gilbert Kwasi Agyei	NDC
Asuogyaman	Kwamena Dwamena-Aboagye	NDC	16,288	Jonathan Robert Owiredu	NDC
Atiwa	Yaw Baning-Darko	NPP	9,255	William Obeng Boateng	NCP
Ayensuano	Evans Kodjo Ahorsey	NDC	5,713	Elizabeth Kusi Aidoo	NCP
Birim North	Kweku Boateng-Lovinger	NDC	8,598	Dr Owusu Agyekum (Minority Leader)	NCP
Fanteakwa	Samuel Ofosu Ampofo	NDC	7,043	Darko Asomaning	NDC
Kade	Francis Kwame Nyarko	NPP	2,429	John Darlington Brobbey	NDC
Koforidua	Yaw Barima	NPP	7,377	Kwame Larbi Nyanteh	NCP
Lower Manya Krobo	Michael Teye Nyanua	NDC	19,045	Major(Rtd) Emmanuel T Tetteh	NDC
Lower West Akim	Akuamoa Ofosu-Boateng	NDC	1,573	Akuamoah Ofosu-Boateng	NDC
Mpraeso	Francis Osafo Mensah	NPP	3,332	Philip Kwabena Boamah	EGLE
New Juabeng North	Hackman Owusu-Agyeman	NPP	4,135	Samuel Nuamah Donkor	NCP
Nkawkaw	Kwabena Adusa Okerchiri	NPP	6,819	Dr Martin Maxwell Owusu-Ansah	NCP
Okere	Fuzzy Dapaah Torbay	NDC	3,243	Seth Atiemo Akuffo	NCP
Suhum	Solomon Kodjoe Akwetey	NDC	5,274	Emmanuel Obeng-Darko	NDC
Upper Manya Krobo	Solomon Tettey Terkper	NDC	10,563	Charles Tei Sawer	NDC
Upper West Akim	Samuel Sallas Mensa	NDC	6,050	Samuel Sallas Mensa	NDC
Yilo Krobo	Daniel Tekpertey	NDC	16,206	Priscilla Esther Korboe	EGLE
=== Greater Accra Region – 22 seats ===
Constituency	Elected MP	Elected Party	Majority	Previous MP	Previous Party
Ablekuma Central	Clement Samuel Crabbe^{a}	NPP	1,206	Victor Agadzi	NDC
Ablekuma North	Kwamena Bartels	NPP	15,533	Adam Baako Nortey Yeboah	NDC
Ablekuma South	Theresa Amerley Tagoe	NPP	5,076	Vincent Birch Freeman	NCP
Ada	Amos Lawerh Buertey	NDC	19,851	Amos Lawerh Buertey	NDC
Ashaiman	Franklin Winfred K. Aheto	NDC	17,131	Franklin Winfred K Aheto	NDC
Ayawaso Central	Sheikh Ibrahim Cudjoe Quaye (Deputy Minority Chief Whip)	NPP	675	Said Sinare	NCP
Ayawaso West-Wuogon	Rebecca Akweley Adotey	NDC	294	Francis Napoleon K Kumah	NDC
Dade-Kotopon	Sylvester A. Mensah	NDC	6,475	Lemuel Nii-Amon Kotei	NCP
Ayawaso East	Farouk Braimah	NDC	23,764	Yahaya Seidu	NDC
Ga North	Sampson Ottu Darkoh	NPP	1,686	Marian Lartele Lartey	EGLE
Ga South	Margaret Clarke Kwesie	NDC	30,578	Frederick Aryee Laryea	NCP
Klottey-Korle	David Lamptey	NDC	3,280	Nathan Tetteh Mensah	EGLE
Kpone-Katamanso	Afieye Ashong	NDC	5,292	Emmanuel Kweku Sagoe	NCP
Krowor	Joshua Alabi	NDC	1,931	Jacob Aplerh Tawiah	NDC
Ledzokuku	Nii Adjei-Boye Sekan (Deputy Majority Whip)	NDC	9,314	Seth Adjei Sow	NCP
Ningo-Prampram	Enoch Teye Mensah	NDC	14,108	Stanley Basil Bade Carboo	NDC
Odododiodoo	Nii Okaidja Adamafio	NDC	2,045	Emm Nii Korley Adu Tetteh	NCP
Okaikwei North	Joseph Darko Mensah	NPP	1,574	Sheriff E Nii Oto Dodoo	NDC
Okaikwei South	Nana Akomea	NPP	12,356	Samuel Wise Quarcoo	EGLE
Shai-Osudoku	Michael Afedi Gizo	NDC	12,495	Michael Afedi Gizo	NDC
Tema East	Ishmael Ashietey	NDC	3,506	Erasmus Aruna Quao	NCP
Tema West	Abraham Ossei-Aidooh	NPP	7,010	Gladys Boateng	NDC
=== Northern Region – 23 seats ===
Constituency	Elected MP	Elected Party	Majority	Previous MP	Previous Party
Bimbilla	George Mpambi Dagmanyi	PNC	4,329	Mohamed Ibn Chambas (First Deputy Speaker) 1993-1994	NDC
Bole	John Dramani Mahama	NDC	9,684	Mahama Jeduah	NDC
Bunkpurugu-Yunyoo	Joseph Yaani Labik	NDC	22,470	Joseph Yaani Labik	NDC
Chereponi	Innocent Mahamadu Yahaya	NDC	6,077	Innocent Mahama Du Yahaya	NDC
Chogu-Tishigu	Ibrahim Adam	NDC	1,561	Ahaji Mohammed Haroon	NDC
Damango-Daboya	Adam Mahama	NDC	859	Edward Aliedong Alhassan	NDC
Gukpegu-Sabongida	Mustapha Ali Iddris	NPP	7,857	Alhaji Basit Abdulai Fuseini	NDC
Gushiegu-Karaga	Iddrisu Huudu	NDC	930	Issahaku Mahama	NDC
Kpandai	Lipkalimor Kwajo Tawiah	NDC	8,969	Likpalior Kwajo Tawiah	NDC
Kumbungu	Muhammed Mumuni	NDC	5,997	Alhassan Musah	NDC
Mion	Alabira Ibrahim	PCP	3,321	Alhassan Ahmed Adams	NDC
Nalerigu	Isaac Kolibilla Batesimah	NDC	18,591	Isaac Kolibilla Batesimah	NDC
Nanton	Alhaji Alhassan Yakubu	NDC	3,493	Alhaji Alhassan Yakubu	NDC
Saboba	Moses Mabengba Bukari	NDC	9,555	Moses Mabengba Bukari	NDC
Salaga	Hamidu Baba Braimah	NDC	2,519	Hamid Baba Braimah	NDC
Savelugu	Mary Salifu Boforo	NDC	9,386	Ahame Shani Yakubu	NCP
Sawla-Kalba	Joseph Trumah Bayel	NDC	13,663	Denwuoh Kinglsey Nanmin Bown	NCP
Tolon	Alhaji Abdullah Salifu	NDC	4,083	Alhaji Abdullah Salifu	NDC
West Mamprusi (Walewale)	Susana Adam	NDC	14,260	Ben Baluri Saibu	NDC
Wulensi	Iddi Saani	NPP	190	Amidu Seidu	NDC
Yapei-Kusawgu	Alhaji Amadu Seidu	NDC	8,280	Wilson Salif Yaquob	EGLE
Yendi	Malik Al-Hassan Yakubu	NPP	6,636	Yusuf Iddrisu	NDC
Zabzugu-Tatale	John Jagri Kokpah	NDC	10,280	Jagri John Kokpah	NDC
=== Upper East Region – 12 seats ===
Constituency	Elected MP	Elected Party	Majority	Previous MP	Previous Party
Bawku Central	Fati Seidu	NDC	8,552	Hawa Yakubu	Independent
Bawku West	Cletus Apul Avoka	NDC	4,943	Cletus Apul Avoka	NDC
Binduri	Fortunate Atubiga	NDC	4,898	Fortunate Atubiga	NDC
Bolgatanga	Simon Anyoa Abingya	NDC	11,239	Akake Patrick	NDC
Bongo	Simon Alangde Asabo	NDC	18,286	Gaaga Akayeri Azitariga	NDC
Builsa North	Theodore Basil Anuka	NDC	9,354	Sylvester Azantilow	NDC
Builsa South	Norbert Garko Awulley	NDC	3,790	Norbert Garko Awullay	NDC
Chiana – Paga	Pele Abuga	NDC	13,737	Dr Stephen Ayidaya	NDC
Garu-Tempane	Dominic Azimbe Azumah	NDC	13,553	Dominic Azimbe Azumah	NDC
Nabdam	Moses Aduku Asaga	NDC	6,382	Danzi Paul Kpal	NDC
Navrongo Central	Clement Tumfuga Bugase	NDC	1,212	John Setuni Achuliwor	Independent
Talensi	John Akologu Tia	NDC	11,219	John Akologu Tia	NDC
=== Upper West Region – 8 seats ===
Constituency	Elected MP	Elected Party	Majority	Previous MP	Previous Party
Jirapa	Francis Gyafiiry Korbieh	NDC	15,973	Issah Alhassan	NCP
Lambussie	Luke Koo^{b}b	NDC	8,189	Alice Teni Boon	NDC
Lawra-Nandom	Anthony Koyiri Bondong	NDC	13,955	Ken Meyir Kunfah	NDC
Nadowli North	Alban Sumana Bagbin	NDC	10,392	Alban Sumana Bagbin	NDC
Nadowli South	Emmanuel Samba Zumakpeh	NDC	6,167	Emmanuel Samba Zumakpel	NDC
Sissala	Amidu Sulemana	NDC	4,099	Alhaji Amidu Sulemana	NDC
Wa Central	Mummuni Abudu Seidu (Deputy Majority Leader)	NDC	14,061	Mumuni Abudu Seidu	NDC
Wa East	Issahaku Salia	NDC	15,633	Issaku Saliah	NDC
=== Volta Region – 19 seats ===
Constituency	Elected MP	Elected Party	Majority	Previous MP	Previous Party
Akan	John Kwadwo Gyapong	NDC	11,066	Seth Kwabena Akompi (Dr)	NCP
Anlo	Cled Mawuko Kwasi Sowu	NDC	35,849	Cled Mawuko Kwasi Sowu	NDC
Avenor	Edward Korbly Doe Adjaho (Majority Chief Whip)	NDC	26,603	Edward Korbly Doe Adjaho	NDC
Biakoye	Kwabena Adjei (Majority Leader)	NDC	18,837	Dr Kwabena Adjei	NDC
Buem	Emil Kwadzo Brantuo	NDC	7,901	Emil Kwadzo Brantuo	NDC
Ho Central	Kofi Attor	NDC	47,085	Vicent Kofi Darkey-Mensah	NCP
Ho East	Steve Senu Akorli	NDC	22,612	Steve Senu Akorli	NDC
Ho West	Francis Aggrey Agbotse	NDC	33,297	Lt. Col E.K.D. Anku-Tsede (rtd.)	NDC
Hohoe North	Nathaniel Kwadzo Aduadjoe	NDC	34,744	Patience Pomary	NDC
Hohoe South	Kosi Kedem	NDC	23,519	Kosi Kedem	NDC
Keta	Dan Kwasi Abodakpi	NDC	31,186	Comdr Kwaku Tsidi Doulo(Rtd)	NCP
Ketu North	Modestus Yao Z. Ahiable	NDC	32,226	Prince R V K Ahiadzro	NCP
Ketu South	Charles Kofi Agbenaza	NDC	49,667	Wisdom Tsidore Seyena-Susu	NDC
Krachi	Sampson Kwadwo Apraku	NDC	23,133	Sampson Kwadwo Apraku	NCP
Nkwanta	Gershon Kofi Gbediame	NDC	22,374	Okpora Peter Kwadwo	NCP
North Dayi	Stephen George Obimpeh	NDC	36,811	Stephen George Obimpeh	NDC
North Tongu	Austin Akufo Gamey	NDC	24,251	Austin Akufo Gamey	NDC
South Dayi	Alexander Ransford Ababio	NDC	10,554	Alexander Ransford Ababio	NDC
South Tongu	Kenneth Dzirasah (First Deputy Speaker)	NDC	18,019	Kenneth Dzirasah (First Deputy Speaker)	NDC
=== Western Region – 19 seats ===
Constituency	Elected MP	Elected Party	Majority	Previous MP	Previous Party
Ahanta West	Samuel Kwofie	NPP	2,275	Francis Fynn	NDC
Amenfi Central	John Frank Abu	NDC	10,508	John Frank Abu	NDC
Amenfi East	George Buadi	NDC	4,252	George Buadi	NDC
Amenfi West	Abraham Kofi Asante	NDC	7,774	Joseph King Amankpah	NDC
Aowin-Suaman	John Kwekuchur Ackah	NDC	19,512	Arthur Sibieko Bullu	NDC
Bia	Christian Kwabena Asante	NDC	26,039	Christian Kwabena Asante	NDC
Bibiani	Seidu Paakuna Adamu	NDC	11,162	Kwame Darko	NDC
Effia-Kwesimintsim	Joseph E.K. Abekah	PCP	17,805	James Mike Abban	NCP
Ellembele	Freddie W.A. Blay (Second Deputy Speaker)	PCP	11	John Aitpillah	NDC
Evalue Gwira	Kojo Armah	PCP	2,097	Charles Henry Turpin	NDC
Jomoro	Joseph Emmanuel Ackah	NDC	9,480	Joseph Emmanuel Ackah	NDC
Juabeso	Anthony K Gyapong-Mensah	NDC	15,658	Kingsley Asoah-Apima	NDC
Mpohor-Wassa East	Samuel Kwame Amponsah	NDC	5,104	Mary Stella Ankomah	NCP
Prestea-Huni-Valley	Kwaku Acheampong Bonful	NDC	935	Kwaku Acheampong Bonful	NDC
Sefwi-Wiawso	Isaac Kobina Nyame-Ofori	NDC	31,113	John Kweku Danso	NDC
Sekondi	Papa Owusu-Ankomah	NPP	13,812	Albert Bosomtwi-Sam	NDC
Shama	Richard Dornu Nartey	NDC	6,822	Richard Dornu Nartey	NDC
Takoradi	Gladys Asmah (Deputy Minority Leader)	NPP	15,237	Tabitha Sybil Quaye	NDC
Tarkwa Nsuaem	Joseph Ghansah	PCP	9,706	Mathew Kojo Kum	NDC

== Ghana Parliament Regional Maps 1996 ==
Ashanti Region 1996

Ashanti Region

https://datawrapper.dwcdn.net/scTRg/3/

Greater Accra Parliamentary Map

Greater Accra Region

https://datawrapper.dwcdn.net/iuhus/1/

Seats won by NDC/NPP in 1996

Brong Ahafo Region

https://datawrapper.dwcdn.net/Hxx5g/2/

Central Region

https://datawrapper.dwcdn.net/Wi7Tn/3/

Eastern Region

https://datawrapper.dwcdn.net/Wi7Tn/3/

== By-elections ==
- ^aAblekuma Central constituency – 26 March 1999 – Victor Okuley Nortey (NPP) won the by-election with a majority of 4,808.
- ^b Lambussie constituency – 26 May 1999 – Following the death of Luke Koo the then MP of the Lambussie constituency, a by-election was held on 26 May 1999 – Alice Teni Boon (NDC) won the seat with a majority of 4,488.

== See also ==
- 1996 Ghanaian parliamentary election
- Parliament of Ghana
- Daniel Francis Annan – Speaker of the Second Parliament
