= Godfrey Abulu =

Ghanaian politician (1950–1995)

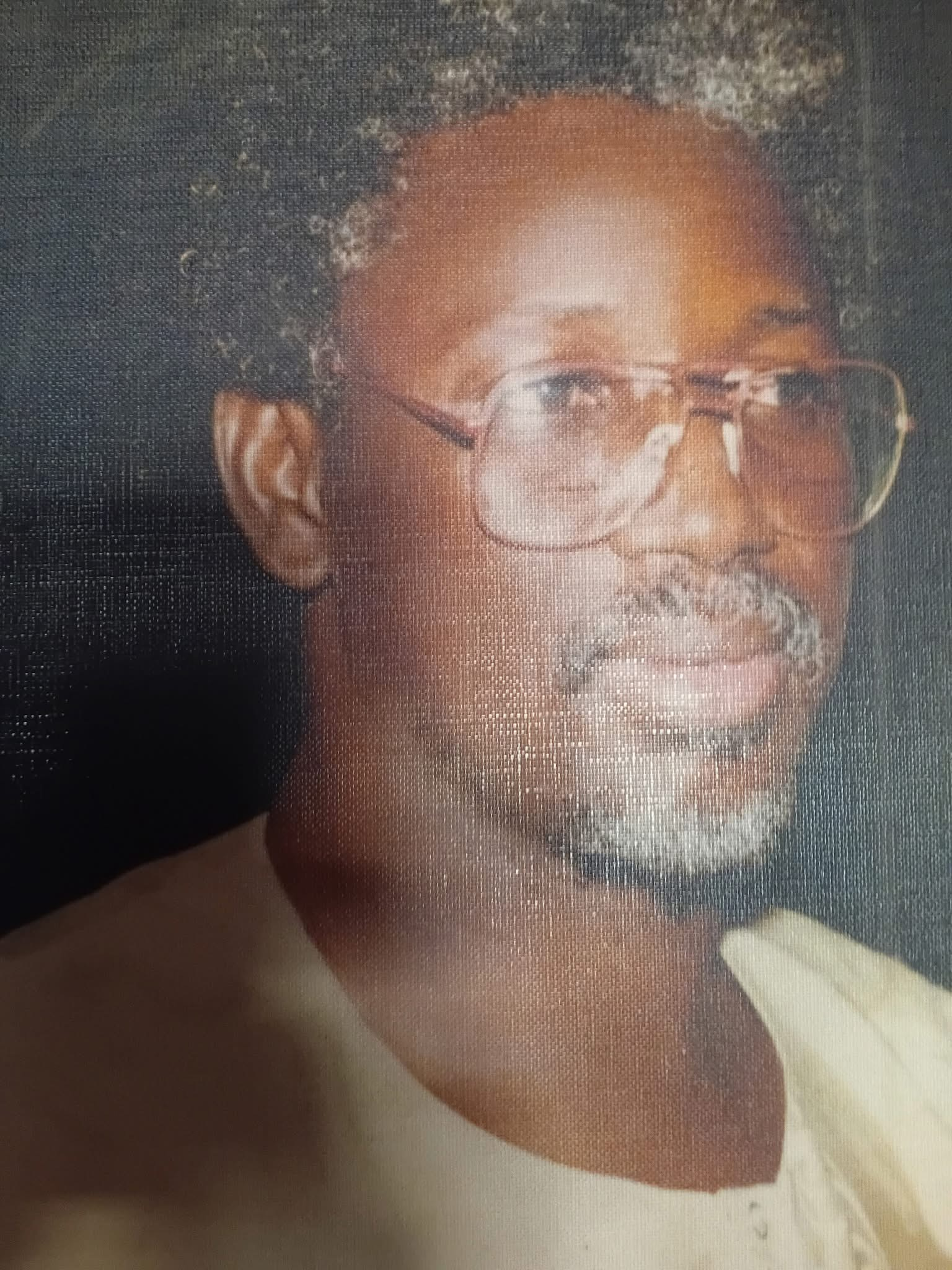

Member of Parliament for Navrongo Central
- In office 7 January 1993 – 1995
- President: Jerry John Rawlings
- Preceded by: Constituency merged
- Succeeded by: John Setuni Achuliwor

Personal details
- Born: Godfrey Abulu; 20 November 1950 Navrongo Central, Ghana
- Died: June 1995 (aged 44) London, England
- Party: National Democratic Congress
- Children: Sherri Abulu
- Occupation: Politician
- Profession: Politician

Godfrey Abulu (20 November 1950 – June 1995) was a Ghanaian politician who served as a member of the first Parliament of the fourth Republic representing the Navrongo Central constituency in the Upper East Region of Ghana.

== Early life and education ==
Godfrey Abulu was born at Navrongo Central in the Upper East Region of Ghana on 20 November 1950.

== Politics ==
Abulu was elected into parliament on the ticket of the National Democratic Congress during the 1992 Ghanaian parliamentary election to represent the Navrongo Central constituency in the Upper East Region of Ghana. John Setuni Achuliwor (then an independent candidate) took over his seat in a by-election on 4 July 1995 after his death. Clement Tumfuga Bugase succeeded Achuliwor after winning the 1996 election with 16,811 votes out of the total valid votes cast representing 41.1%. His opponent John Setuni Achuliwor polled 15,599 votes representing 38.1%.

== Career ==
Abulu was a member of parliament for the Navrongo Central Constituency in the Upper East Region of Ghana. He once served as deputy secretary (deputy Minister) for Agriculture and acting Regional Minister for the Upper East Region.

== Personal life and death ==
Abulu was a Christian. He died in London, England in June 1995, at the age of 44.
