= Oppong =

Oppong is an Akan surname. Notable people with the surname include:

== Politicians and public officials ==
- Abena Asuamah Oppong, Ghanaian judge
- Abena Oppong-Asare (born 1983), British Labour Party politician
- Akwasi Opong-Fosu (born 1958), Ghanaian politician
- David Oppong Kusi, Ghanaian politician
- Edward Oppong Marfo, Ghanaian journalist
- J. K. Oppong, Chief of Staff of the Ghanaian Navy from 1982 to 1985
- James Oppong-Boanuh (born 1958), Inspector General of the Ghana Police Service from 2019 to 2021
- Kojo Oppong Nkrumah (born 1982), Ghanaian politician and lawyer.
- Marietta Brew Appiah-Oppong, Attorney General of Ghana from 2013 to 2017
- Samuel Oppong, Ghanaian politician
- Thomas Oppong-Peprah, Chief of the Defence Staff of the Ghana Armed Forces from 2024 to 2025
- Vincent Oppong Asamoah (born 1966), Ghanaian politician
- Yaw Oppong Kyekyeku (born 1947), a Ghanaian politician

== Sportspeople ==
- Dominic Oppong (born 1986), Ghanaian-born Canadian former soccer player
- Elizabeth Oppong (born 2003), a Ghanaian football player
- Kojo Peprah Oppong (born 2004), Ghanaian football defender, playing for Fenerbahçe
- Oscar Naasei Oppong (born 2005), Ghanaian football defender, playing for Real Madrid Castilla
- Papa Oppong (born 1987), Canadian former professional basketball player
- Samuel Oppong (born 1998), Austrian football midfielder
- Samuel Oppong (born 2005), Ghanaian football striker
- Sion Oppong (born 2007), Swedish football winger

== Other ==
- Christine Oppong, British anthropologist
- Josephine Oppong-Yeboah (born 1979), Ghanaian journalist
- Moses Kweku Oppong, Ghanaian musician
- Samson Oppong (c. 1884 – c.1960 or 1965), Akan Christian preacher
- Samuel Kwesi Oppong (1946–2001), Ghanaian actor, musician and storyteller
