= Kofi Attor =

Ghanaian politician

Hon. Kofi Attor

Member of Parliament for Ho Central Constituency
- In office January 7th 1993 – January 6th 2005
- Preceded by: Vicent Kofi Darkey-Mensah
- Succeeded by: Capt (rtd.) George Kofi Nfodjoh

Personal details
- Party: National Democratic Congress

Kofi Attor (born 3 December 1954) is a politician and Ghana's Ambassador to Cuba. He was a member of the 4th Republic of Ghana, representing the Ho Central constituency in the Volta Region of Ghana.

== Education ==
Kofi attended the Institute of Social Studies and obtained a master's degree in art and development studies. He attended The Hague in the Netherlands and the University of Ghana, obtaining a bachelor's degree and a B.A in political science.

== Career ==
Kofi was an administrator, a lawyer and the former chief executive officer of Ghana Investment Fund for Electronic Communications (GIFEC).

== Political career ==
Kofi is a member of the National Democratic Congress. He was elected to the first Parliament of the fourth Republic of Ghana on 7 January 1993 following his victory at the 1992 Ghanaian parliamentary election (held on 29 December 1992). He was elected as the member of Parliament for the Ho central constituency in the 3rd Parliament of the 4th Republic. He currently serves as Ghana's Ambassador to Cuba. He was sworn in on February 9th 2026 by President John Mahama.

== Elections ==
During the 1996 Ghanaian general elections, he polled 49,999 votes out of the 58,282 valid votes cast, representing 74.10% over his opponents (Geoffery Quarshie Dzormeku polled 2,914 votes, John N. K. Akorli polled 1,342 votes, Alex Kyere Odikr polled 634 votes, and Salome Ofori-Owusu polled 393 votes).

Kofi was elected as the member of Parliament for the Ho Central constituency in the 2000 Ghanaian general elections. He won the elections. His constituency was a part of the 17 parliamentary seats out of 19 seats, won by the National Democratic Congress in that election for the Volta Region.

The National Democratic Congress won a minority total of 92 parliamentary seats out of 200 seats in the 3rd Parliament of the 4th Republic of Ghana. He was elected with 37,131 total valid votes cast. This was equivalent to 83.30% of the total valid votes cast.

He was elected over John N.K Akorli of the New Patriotic Party, Eli Kotoku Eliikem of the Convention People's Party, Cousin Doamekpor of the National Reform Party, Mathias Sinbad Adom of the United Ghana Movement, Alfa Anas Hamidu of the Peoples National Convention Party, and Stephen B. Ashun, an independent candidate. These opponents obtained 3,812, 2,228, 1,043, 238, 110 and 0 votes respectively. This is equivalent to 8.60%, 5.00%, 2.30%, 0.50%, 0.20% and 0.00% of the total valid votes cast.
