= Jargisu Ibrahim =

Ghanaian politician

MP for Kumawu
- In office 7 January 1993 – 6 January 1997
- President: Jerry John Rawlings
- Preceded by: New
- Succeeded by: Reo Addai Basoah

Personal details
- Born: 9 September 1949 (age 76) Kumawu, Ashanti Region Ghana)
- Party: National Democratic Congress
- Education: King Saud University
- Occupation: Politician
- Profession: Clerk

Jargisu Ibrahim born (9 September 1949) is a Ghanaian politician and a former member of Parliament for the Kumawu constituency in the Ashanti region. He represented his constituency in the first Parliament of the fourth Republic of Ghana.

== Early life and education ==
Ibrahim was born on 9 September 1949 at Peminase in the Ashanti Region of Ghana. He attended Tweneboah Kodua Secondary School and the King Saud University where he obtained his Bachelor of Arts in Linguistics.

== Politics ==
Ibrahim was first elected into Parliament on the Ticket of the National Democratic Congress during the December 1992 Ghanaian parliamentary election for the Kumawu Constituency in the Ashanti Region of Ghana. He polled 5,862 votes to win the seat. He was defeated by Reo Addai Basoah of the New Patriotic Party who polled 15,025 representing 49.60% votes out of the total valid votes cast over his opponents Jargisu Ibrahim who polled 9,354 votes representing 30.90%, and Ernest Boakye Yiadom of the People's National Convention who also polled 532 votes representing 1.80%.

== Career ==
Ibrahim is a clerk by profession and a former member of Parliament for the Kumawu Constituency in the Ashanti Region of Ghana.

== Personal life ==
Ibrahim is a Muslim (Islam).
