= Emmanuel Obeng Mensah =

Ghanaian politician (1934-?)

Member of Parliament for Wenchi East constituency
- In office 7 January 1993 – 6 January 1997
- President: Jerry John Rawlings
- Parliamentary group: National Democratic Congress

Personal details
- Born: 1 October 1934
- Died: 1996 or 1997
- Occupation: Teacher

Emmanuel Obeng Mensah (1 October 1934 – 1996 or 1997) was a Ghanaian politician and was a member of the First Parliament of the Fourth Republic of Ghana from 1993 to 1997 representing Wenchi East Constituency under the membership of the National Democratic Congress.

== Early life and education ==
Mensah was born on 1 July 1934. He attended University of Ghana, Legon. He worked as an educationist before going into parliament.

== Politics ==
Mensah began his political career in 1992 when he became the parliamentary candidate for the National Democratic Congress (NDC) to represent his constituency in the Brong Ahafo region of Ghana prior to the commencement of the 1992 Ghanaian parliamentary election.

He was sworn into the First Parliament of the Fourth Republic of Ghana on 7 January 1993 after being pronounced winner at the 1992 Ghanaian election held on 29 December 1992.

He lost his candidacy to his fellow party comrade Hayford Osei Kwadwo before the commencement of the 1996 Ghanaian general elections. Hayford thereafter lost the election to his counterpart Alhaji Moctar Musah Bambah of the New Patriotic Party who polled 37.30% of the total valid votes cast which was equivalent to 13,694 votes while Hayford polled 33.50% of the total valid votes cast as well which was equivalent to 12,283 votes.

== Death ==
Mensah died whilst in office, in 1996 or 1997.
