= Kodua =

Kodua (Georgian: კოდუა) is a Ghanaian and Georgian surname. Notable people with the surname include:

- Davit Kodua, Georgian politician
- Dayan Kodua (born 1980), German actress, author and model of Ghanaian descent
- Gideon Kodua (born 2004), English footballer
- Joel Kodua (born 1997), Ghanaian-born English boxer
- Tweneboa Kodua, 17th century Ghanaian monarch
- Tweneboa Kodua Fokuo (born 1977), Ghanaian politician and entrepreneur

== See also ==
- Koduah
