= Jonathan Robert Owiredu =

Ghanaian politician (born 1931)

Member of Parliament for Asuogyaman
- President: Jerry John Rawlings
- Parliamentary group: National Democratic Congress

Personal details
- Born: 14 March 1931
- Education: Hendon College of Technology
- Occupation: Business executive

Jonathan Robert Owiredu (born 14 March 1931) is a Ghanaian politician and member of the first parliament of the fourth republic of Ghana representing Asuogyaman constituency under the membership of the National Democratic Congress (NDC)

== Early life and education ==
Owiredu was born on 14 March 1931. He attended the Hendon College of Technology where he obtained his Post-Graduate Diploma in Management Studies. He worked as a Business Executive before going into parliament.

== Politics ==
Owiredu began his political career in 1992 when he became the parliamentary candidate for the National Democratic Congress (NDC) to represent his constituency in the Eastern Region of Ghana prior to the commencement of the 1992 Ghanaian parliamentary election.

Owiredu was sworn into the First Parliament of the Fourth Republic of Ghana on 7 January 1993 after being pronounced winner at the 1992 Ghanaian election held on 29 December 1992.

After serving his four years tenure in office, Owiredu lost his candidacy to his fellow party comrade Kwamena Dwamena-Aboagye. He defeated Ntow-Bediako Emmanuel Wellin of the New Patriotic Party (NPP) who polled 4,032 votes representing 10.20% of the total valid votes cast and John Arjarquah of the Convention People's Party (CPP) who polled 321 votes representing 0.80% of the total valid votes cast at the 1996 Ghanaian general elections. Kwamena polled 20,320 votes which was equivalent to 51.40% of the total valid votes cast. He was thereafter elected on 7 January 1997.
