= Gilbert Kwasi Agyei =

Ghanaian Politician

Hon. Gilbert Kwasi Agyei

Member of parliament for Akwatia constituency
- In office 7 January 1993 – 7 January 1997
- President: Jerry John Rawlings
- Preceded by: Lionel Kofi Ablordepey
- Succeeded by: Mohammed Erzuah Siam

Personal details
- Born: 10 January 1962 (age 64)
- Party: National Democratic Congress
- Education: Akwatia Technical Institute
- Occupation: Politician

Gilbert Kwasi Agyei (born 10 January 1962) is a Ghanaian politician and a Diamond Winner. He served for the Akwatia constituency as member of the first parliament of the fourth republic in the Eastern Region of Ghana.

== Early life and education ==
Gilbert Kwasi Agyei was born on January, 10th 1962 in the Eastern Region. He attended Akwatia Technical Institute where he had his General Certificate of Education (GCE) Ordinary Level.

== Politics ==
Gilbert Kwasi Agyei was elected as member of first parliament of the fourth republic during the 1992 Ghanaian parliamentary election on the ticket of the National Democratic Congress, succeeded Lionel Kofi Ablordepey of United National Convention(UNC) who took the seat in 1979 parliament . He lost the seat to Mohammed Erzuah Siam of the National Democratic Congress in the 1996 Ghanaian general election. He polled 22,140 votes out of the 38,701 valid votes cast which represented 52.90% over his opponents Francis A. Y. Agyare-Bray of New Patriotic Party (NPP) who polled 12,815 votes which represented 30.60%, Ernest Kwame Ampofo of People's National Convention (PNC) who polled 2,240 votes which represented 5.30% and Joseph Kofi Asiedu of National Convention Party(NCP) who polled 1,506 votes which represented 3.60% of the share.

== Career ==
He is a former member of parliament from 7 January 1993 to 7 January 1997.

== Personal life ==
He is a Christian.
