= Francis Kwadwo Gyefour =

Ghanaian politician (born 1945)

Hon. Francis Kwadwo Gyefour

Member of Parliament for Krachi constituency
- In office 7 January 1993 – 7 January 1997
- President: Jerry John Rawlings
- Succeeded by: Sampson Kwadwo Apraku

Personal details
- Born: 17 March 1945 (age 81)
- Party: National Democratic Congress
- Education: University of Bremen
- Occupation: Politician

Francis Kwadwo Gyefour (born 17 March 1945) is a Ghanaian politician. He served for the Krachi constituency as a member of parliament in the Volta Region of Ghana.

== Politics ==
Gyefour was first elected during the 1992 Ghanaian parliamentary election on the ticket of the National Democratic Congress as a member of the first parliament of the fourth republic. Sampson Kwadwo Apraku took the seat from him in the 1996 Ghanaian general election with 31,055 votes which represented 44.10% of the share by defeating Jilimah Patrick Charity of the Convention People's Party (CPP) who obtained 7,922 votes which represented 11.20% of the share; Francis Gyefour an Independen who obtained 7,896 votes which represented 11.20% of the share; Isaac K.Bruce-Mensah Phoyon an Independent who obtained 1,513 votes which represented 2.10% of the share and John Ajet-Nasam of the New Patriotic Party (NPP) who obtained no votes.
