= Samuel Oppong =

Samuel Oppong may refer to:

- Samuel Oppong (Ghanaian footballer)
- Samuel Oppong (Austrian footballer)
- Samuel Oppong (politician)
- Samuel Kwesi Oppong, Ghanaian actor, musician and storyteller
