= Kwarteng (surname) =

Kwarteng is a Ghanaian surname. It is of Asante origin. Notable people with the surname include:

- Abigail Kwarteng (born 1997), Ghanaian high jumper
- Hiram Kojo Kwarteng Boateng (born 1996), British footballer
- Kwasi Kwarteng (born 1975), British politician and historian
- Kwaku Kwarteng (born 1969), Ghanaian civil engineer, economist and politician
- Moritz Kwarteng (born 1998), German footballer
- Nana Koduah Kwarteng, Ghanaian politician

== See also ==
- Kwame Kwaten
