= Kumawu (Ghana parliament constituency) =

Constituency in the Ashanti Region of Ghana

- constituency for the Parliament of Ghana
- District: Sekyere Afram Plains District
- Region: Ashanti Region of Ghana

Current constituency
- Party: New Patriotic Party
- MP: Ernest Yaw Anim

Kumawu is one of the constituencies represented in the Parliament of Ghana. It elects one Member of Parliament (MP) by the first past the post system of election. Kumawu is located in the Sekyere Afram Plains District of the Ashanti Region of Ghana.

== Boundaries ==
The seat is located within the Sekyere Afram Plains District of the Ashanti Region of Ghana.

== Members of Parliament ==
First elected	Member	Party
Created 1992
1992	Jargisu Ibrahim	National Democratic Congress
1996	Reo Addai Basoah	New Patriotic Party
2004	Yaw Baah	New Patriotic Party
2012	Philip Basoah	New Patriotic Party
2023	Ernest Yaw Anim	New Patriotic Party

== Elections ==
2024 Ghanaian general election:Kumawu
Party	Candidate	Votes	%	±%
NPP	Ernest Yaw Anim	21,464	76.15	+5.24
NDC	Kwasi Amankwaa	6,723	23.85	+6.56
Majority		14,741	52.30	−0.34
Turnout		—	—	—
Registered electors		—		—

There was a by-election held in May 2023 by the Electoral Commission of Ghana. This was due to the sudden death of Philip Basoah, the sitting member, in March 2023. The New Patriotic Party (NPP) retained the seat. Both independent candidates in the election had the same name.

2023 By-election: Kumawu:
Party	Candidate	Votes	%	±%
NPP	Ernest Yaw Anim	15,264	70.91	—
NDC	Kwasi Amankwaa	3,723	17.29	—
Independent	Kwaku Duah	2,478	11.51	—
Independent	Kwaku Duah	62	0.29	—
Majority		11,541	53.62	−1.32
Turnout		20,375	44.89	
Registered electors		34,800		

2016 Ghanaian general election :Kumawu Source : Peacefmonline
Party	Candidate	Votes	%
NPP	PHILIP BASOAH	21,794	78.17
NDC	EMMANUEL WILLIAM AMOAKO	5,899	21.16
CPP	OPOKU KYEI CLIFFORD	188	0.67

Ghanaian parliamentary election, 2012:Kumawu Source : Peacefmonline
Party	Candidate	Votes	%
NPP	PHILIP BASOAH	18,858	68.96
NDC	ASIAMAH SAMUEL	4,142	15.15
IND	DOMINIC OTENG	3,991	14.59
PPP	COLLINS KUMI BOATENG	301	1.10
PNC	ASANTE ISAAC	53	0.19
NDP	YAW OPOKU MENSAH	0	0.00
PPP	JOHN AGYEMAN BADU	0	0.00

2008 Ghanaian general election :Kumawu Source :Peacefmonline
Party	Candidate	Votes	%
NPP	YAW BAAH	15,217	56.38
IND	DOMINIC OTENG	7,120	26.38
NDC	OHENE KWASI AGYEMANG	4,278	15.85
CPP	KOFI ADU POKU	199	0.74
DFP	YAW OPOKU MENSAH	174	0.64

Ghanaian parliamentary election, 2004: Kumawu Source :Peacefmonline
Party	Candidate	Votes	%
NPP	YAW BAAH	19,223	70.00
NDC	GEORGE AMANKWAA	5,680	20.70
CPP	KOFI ADU POKU	1,831	6.70
IND	PATRICK OSEI ABOAGYE	556	2.00
GCPP	YAW OPOKU MENSAHG	187	0.70

Ghanaian parliamentary election, 2000: Kumawu Source :Peacefmonline
Party	Candidate	Votes	%
NPP	Reo Addai Basoah	13,554	57.80
NDC	Opanin Kwame Adu	6,057	25.80
IND	Kingsford O. Boateng	3,129	13.40
NRP	Bannor B. Augustine	273	1.20
CPP	Okra Frempong	186	0.80
PNC	James Yaw Owusu	138	0.60
UGM	Osei Bonsu Thompson	100	0.40

Ghanaian parliamentary election, 1996 : Kumawu Source :Peacefmonline
Party	Candidate	Votes	%
NPP	Reo Addai Basoah	15,025	49.60
NDC	Jargisu Ibrahim	9,354	30.90
PNC	Ernest Boakye Yiadom	532	1.80

== See also ==
- List of Ghana Parliament constituencies
- List of political parties in Ghana
