= Ruben Wisdom Wollie =

Ghanaian Politician and former member of parliament for Jaman Constituency

Member of Parliament for Jaman constituency
- President: Jerry John Rawlings
- Parliamentary group: National Democratic Congress

Personal details
- Born: 8 August 1943 (age 83)
- Education: University of Cape Coast
- Occupation: Teacher

Ruben Wisdom Wollie is a Ghanaian politician and member of the first parliament of the fourth republic of Ghana representing Jaman Constituency under the membership of the National Democratic Congress.

== Early life and education ==
Ruben was born on 8 August 1943. He attended University of Cape Coast where he obtained his Bachelor of Education in Sociology. He worked as a teacher before going into parliament.

== Politics ==
Ruben began his political career in 1992 when he became the parliamentary candidate for the National Democratic Congress (NDC) to represent his constituency in the Brong-Ahafo region of Ghana prior to the commencement of the 1992 Ghanaian parliamentary election. He was elected into the first parliament of the fourth republic of Ghana on 7 January 1993 after being pronounced winner at the 1992 Ghanaian election held on 29 December 1992. He lost his candidacy to his fellow party comrade Nicholas Appiah-Kubi who defeated Rampson Stephen Ofori of the New Patriotic Party at the 1996 Ghanaian general elections. Nicholas Appiah-Kubi polled 34.70% of the total valid votes cast which was equivalent to 30,311 votes but his opponent polled 17.90% of the total valid votes cast which was equivalent to 15,608 votes.
