= Ernest Yaw Anim =

Ghanaian politician and accountant

Hon. Ernest Yaw Anim
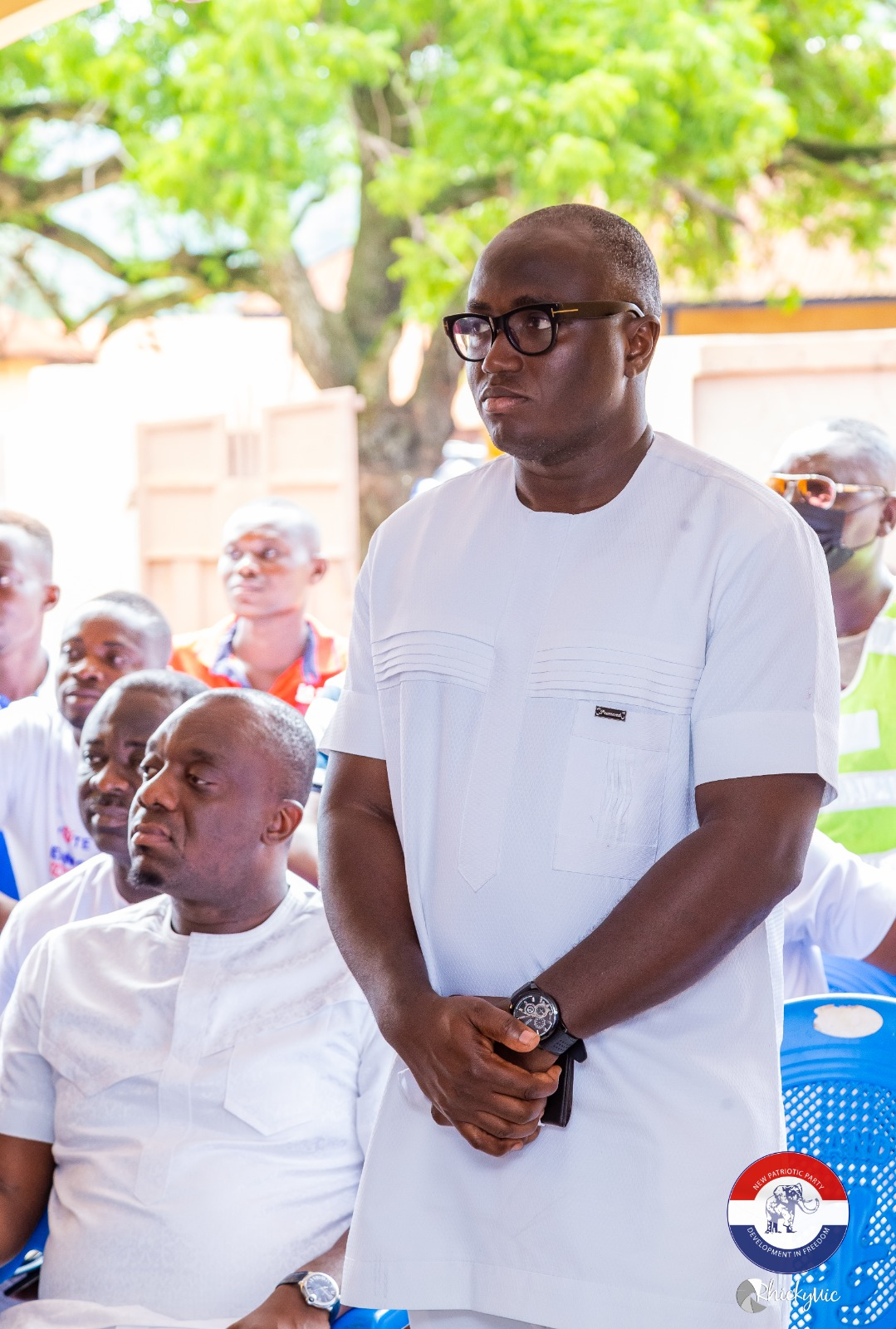

Member of Parliament for Kumawu
- Incumbent
- Assumed office 7 January 2017
- Incumbent
- Assumed office 2017
- President: Nana Akufo-Addo

Personal details
- Born: Ernest Yaw Anim
- Party: New Patriotic Party
- Occupation: Politician, accountant

Ernest Yaw Anim is a Ghanaian politician. He is a member of the Eight Parliament of the 4th Republic of Ghana representing Kumawu Constituency in the Ashanti Region of Ghana.

== Early life ==
Yaw Anim was born on January 31, 1985. He hails from Kumawu in the Ashanti Region of Ghana.

== Education ==
In 2004, he pursued a certificate in statistics from the University of Ghana. He then proceeded to the University of Cape Coast, where he studied commerce and graduated in 2009. He earned his Masters in Financial Economics at Ohio University in the United States.

== Career ==
Ernest Yaw Anim is a chartered accountant with experience in the financial sector. He served as a senior accountant at Vanguard Properties Development in Ghana, where he held various roles, including financial controller.

Before his tenure at Vanguard, he worked as an account officer at the Millennium Development Authority in Ghana.

== Politics ==
Ernest Yaw Anim is a member of the New Patriotic Party (NPP). He emerged the winner of the by-election on May 23, in the Kumawu Consutituency of the Ashanti Region. He had a total of 15264 out of the total valid votes casts making up 70.91% to retain the seat for the New Patriotic Party (NPP).
