= Prince Ofosu Sefah =

Ghanaian politician

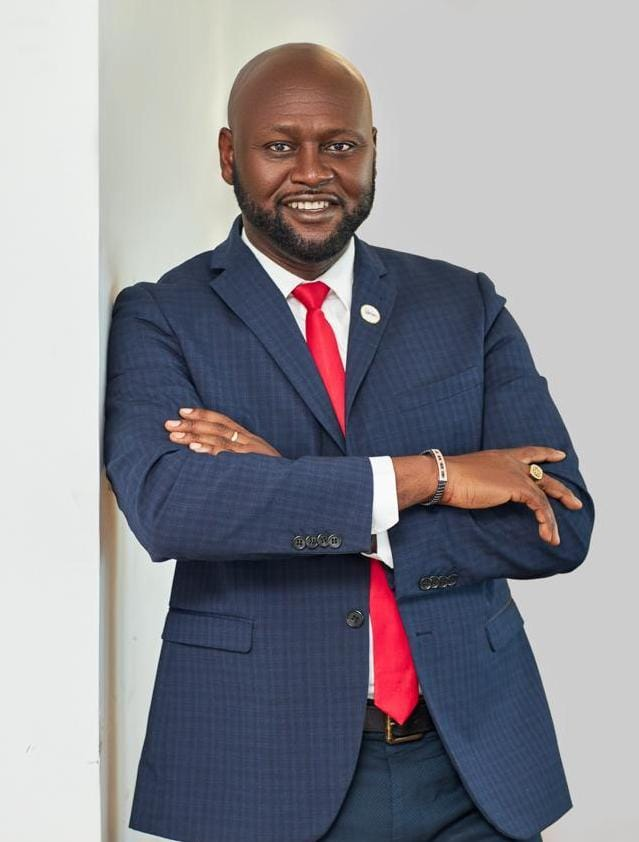

Personal details
- Born: Prince Ofosu Sefah
- Party: New Patriotic Party
- Education: Ryerson University; University of Ghana

Prince Ofosu Sefah is a Ghanaian politician with about 30 years of professional experience spanning manufacturing, banking, ICT, oil and gas, and telecommunications sectors, with work experience in both Central and Western Canada as well as Ghana. From August 2021 until May 6, 2024, he served as the administrator – chief executive officer (CEO) of Ghana Investment Fund for Electronic Communications (GIFEC), where he spearheaded the operations and management of the fund.

== Education ==
He attended St. Peters Senior High School. He has a Bachelor of Commerce in Information Technology Management from Ryerson University Toronto, Canada and a Masters in Business Administration from the University of Ghana, Legon. He is certified as a Senior Professional in Human Resources International (SPHRi)

== Public Service ==
He was the administrator for the Ghana Investment Fund for Electronic Communications (GIFEC), a board member of the Institute of ICT Professionals Ghana and a former board member of the Accra Digital Centre. From 2017 to 2021, Mr. Sefah served as the Deputy Director-General for the National Communication Authority (NCA) in charge of Operations, where he led NCA's decentralized Field & Regional Operations across the country as well as oversaw the critical Administration function . He was a board member of the Accra Digital Centre, where he chaired the Board's Technical & Operations Committee.

== Politics ==
Prince Sefah is an NPP Activist since 1992.

Has held the following Party positions:

- Organiser - NPP Toronto Chapter
- Secretary (2 Terms) - NPP Toronto Chapter
- Secretary - NPP Edmonton Chapter
- Secretary - NPP Canada Branch
- Chairman - Diaspora Patriots in Ghana (DPG) Foundation
- Member of the Council of Patrons - Eastern Region NPP
- Chairman of the Finance Committee - Eastern Region NPP

== Honours ==
In the year 2000 he received an economic book price; on the Economy of Developing Countries awarded by Ryerson University. He has achieved an Advanced Leader and Advanced Communicator designations from Toastmasters International.
