= Benjamin Komla Kpodo =

Ghanaian politician

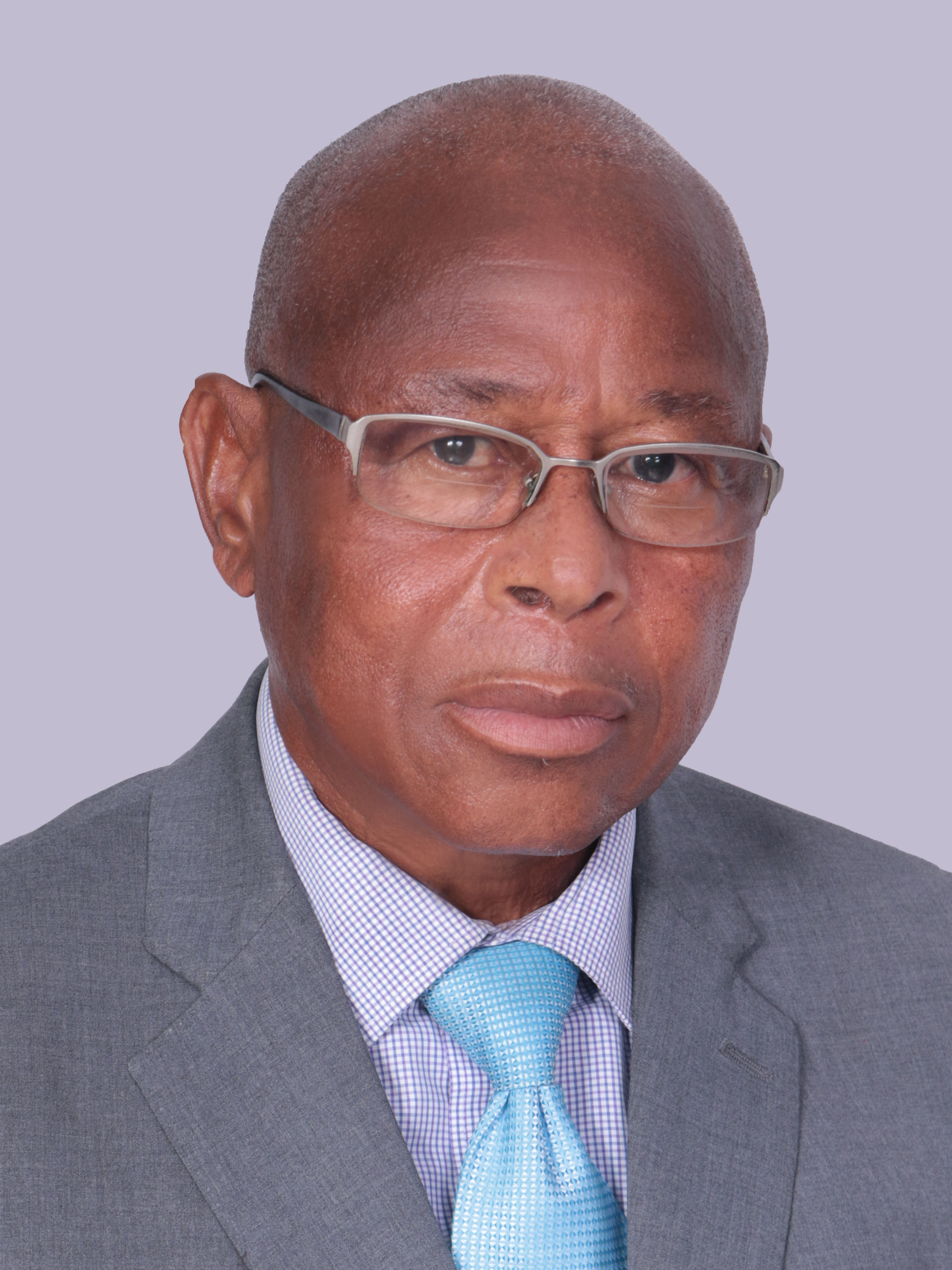

Member of the Ghana Parliament for Ho Central
- Incumbent
- Assumed office 7 January 2013
- Preceded by: George Kofi Nfodjoh
- Majority: 57,119

Personal details
- Born: 22 December 1953 (age 72)
- Party: National Democratic Congress

Benjamin Komla Kpodo is a Ghanaian politician and member of the Seventh Parliament of the Fourth Republic of Ghana representing the Ho Central Constituency in the Volta Region on the ticket of the National Democratic Congress.

== Early life and education ==
Kpodo was born on 22 December 1953. He hails from Tanyigbe, a town in the Volta Region of Ghana. He obtained his bachelor's degree in Administration-Accounting option from the University of Ghana in 1980. He obtained his master's of science in Accounting from the University of Lagos in 1991.

== Politics ==
Kpodo is a member of the National Democratic Congress (NDC). In 2012, he contested for the Ho Central seat on the ticket of the NDC sixth parliament of the fourth republic and won. He retained his seat in the 2016 Ghanaian general election, winning 79.5% of the votes. In the 2020 election, he won 85% of the votes to again retain his seat.

== Employment ==
- Finance Officer, University of Education, Winneba
- Member of Parliament (7 January 2013 – present; 2nd term)

== Personal life ==
He is a Christian (Evangelical Presbyterian). He is married, with seven children.

Parliament of Ghana
Preceded by George Kofi Nfodjoh	Member of Parliament for Ho Central; 2013–present	Incumbent
