= Hennric Yeboah =

Ghanaian politician and businessman (1957–2019)

Hon. Hennric Yeboah

Member of the Ghana Parliament for Afigya Sekyere East Constituency
- In office 7 January 2013 – 6 January 2017
- President: John Mahama
- Succeeded by: Mavis Nkansah Boadu

Member of Parliament for Afigya Sekyere East Constituency
- In office 7 January 2009 – 6 January 2013
- President: John Atta Mills; John Mahama

Member of Parliament for Afigya Sekyere East Constituency
- In office 7 January 2005 – 6 January 2009
- President: John Kufuor
- Preceded by: Kwesi Akomia Kyeremateng

Personal details
- Born: Hennric David Yeboah; 11 March 1957 Agona, Ghana
- Died: 1 March 2019 (aged 62) Kumasi, Ghana
- Party: New Patriotic Party
- Children: Five
- Education: Malcolm X College, Chicago, USA
- Profession: Businessman

Hennric David Yeboah (11 March 1957 – 1 March 2019) was a Ghanaian businessman and politician. He was the Member of Parliament representing the Afigya Sekyere East constituency of the Ashanti Region of Ghana in the 4th, 5th, and 6th Parliaments of the 4th Republic of Ghana. He was a member of the New Patriotic Party.

== Early life and education ==
Yeboah was born on 11 March 1957. He hailed from Agona, Ashanti Region of Ghana. He studied at Malcolm X College in Chicago, Illinois, where he received a diploma in 1986.

== Career ==
Yeboah was a businessman and was the CEO of Daphelia Enterprise Limited at Spintex Road, Accra, Ghana.

== Political career ==
Yeboah was a member of the New Patriotic Party. He first entered parliament in 2004 as the member of parliament for the Afigya Sekyere East Constituency in the Ashanti region of Ghana. He ran for two more terms in the 5th and 6th Parliament of the 4th Republic. In 2015, he lost the New Patriotic Party primaries to Mavis Nkansah Boadu.

== Elections ==
Yeboah was elected as the member of parliament for the Afigya Sekyere East constituency of the Ashanti Region of Ghana for the first time in the 2004 Ghanaian general elections. He won on the ticket of the New Patriotic Party. His constituency was a part of the 36 parliamentary seats out of 39 seats won by the New Patriotic Party in that election for the Ashanti Region. The New Patriotic Party won a majority total of 128 parliamentary seats out of 230 seats. He was elected with 32,143 votes out of 41,220 total valid votes cast equivalent to 78% of total valid votes cast. He was elected over Edward Kusi Ayarkwah of the National Democratic Congress, Adamu Alhassan of the Convention People's Party and Alhaji Amidu Adam of the Democratic People's Party. These obtained 20.5%, 1% and 0.60% respectively of total valid votes cast.

In 2008, he won the general elections on the ticket of the New Patriotic Party for the same constituency. His constituency was part of the 34 parliamentary seats out of 39 seats won by the New Patriotic Party in that election for the Ashanti Region. The New Patriotic Party won a minority total of 109 parliamentary seats out of 230 seats. He was elected with 33,080 votes out of 43,505 total valid votes cast equivalent to 76.04% of total valid votes cast. He was elected over Edward Ayarkwah of the National Democratic Congress, Osman Isshak of the People's National Convention, Amidu Alhaji Adam of the Democratic People's Party and Obeng Nyantakyi Clement of the Convention People's Party. These obtained 21.61%, 0.59%, 0.29% and 1.47% respectively of the total votes cast.

== Personal life ==
Yeboah was a Christian. He was a member of a Charismatic Christian Church. He was married with five children.

== Death ==
Yeboah died on 1 March 2019, at the age of 62, while receiving medical treatment at the Komfo Anokye Teaching Hospital in Kumasi.

== See also ==
- List of MPs elected in the 2004 Ghanaian parliamentary election
- List of MPs elected in the 2008 Ghanaian parliamentary election
- List of MPs elected in the 2012 Ghanaian parliamentary election
