= Ghana Investment Fund for Electronic Communications =

Ghanaian Company

The Ghana Investment Fund for Electronic Communications (GIFEC) was established as an implementing agency of the Ministry of Communications, in January 2004, with the formulation of the comprehensive ICT for Accelerated Development (ICT4AD) Policy, which seeks to engineer an ICT-led socio-economic development process with the potential to transform Ghana into a middle income, information-rich, knowledge-based and technology driven economy and society The legislation that strengthened the agency was promulgated in 2008 as the Electronic Communications Act 775, aimed at providing for electronic communications, broadcasting, and the use of the electro-magnetic spectrum and related facilities in Ghana. The promulgation of the Electronic Communications Act, 2008 (Act 775) gave legal backing to the organisation, thereby changing its name to Ghana Investment Fund for Electronic Communications (GIFEC), as well as giving it an expanded mandate and scope. It is the Government of Ghana agency established to facilitate the implementation of universal access to electronic communication and the provision of internet to under-served and un-served communities, facilitate capacity building programmes and promote ICT.

== Operation ==
The scope of operations of GIFEC as enshrined in section 32 of Act 775 mandates the organisation to facilitate the implementation of universal access to electronic communication and the provision of internet point of presence in underserved and unserved communities, facilitate capacity building programs and promote ICT inclusion in the unserved and underserved communities, facilitate capacity building programmes, promote ICT inclusion in unserved and underserved communities, the deployment of ICT equipment to educational, vocational and other training institutions.

== Board of Trustees ==
The Ghana Investment Fund for Electronic Communications is governed by a board of trustees comprising the following ministries/organizations, with the chairperson appointed by the President of the Republic of Ghana:

- Ministry of Communications and Digitalisation
- Parliamentary Select Committee on Communications
- National Communications Authority (NCA)
- Four (4) members from the Industry Forum
- Administrator of GIFEC

== Administrators (CEOs) OF GIFEC ==
Current Administrator (CEO)-Mrs. Eva Andoh-Poku

Former Administrator (CEO) August 2021-May 2024- Mr. Prince Ofosu Sefah

Former Administrator (CEO) February 2017-August 2021-Hon. Abraham Kofi Asante.

Former Administrator (CEO) July 2015- Jan. 2017-Mr. Kwabena Owusu Akyeampong.

Former Administrator (CEO) August 2009-June 2015-Hon. Kofi Attoh.

Former Administrator (CEO) 2004- May 2009-Hon. Kofi Asante.
