= George Kwabena Owusu =

Ghanaian politician

Member of parliament for Techiman South constituency
- In office 7 January 1993 – 6 January 1997
- President: Jerry John Rawlings
- Preceded by: new
- Succeeded by: Kwadwo Mama Adams

Personal details
- Born: 26 May 1940 (age 86)
- Party: National Democratic Congress
- Occupation: Accountant

George Kwabena Owusu (born 1940) is a Ghanaian politician and was a member of the First Parliament of the Fourth Republic of Ghana from 1993 to 1997 representing Techiman South Constituency under the membership of the National Democratic Congress.

== Early life and education ==
George was born 26 May 1940. He attended North East London Polytechnic where he studied Accounting and became a Chartered Certified Accountant . He worked as an accountant before going into parliament.

== Politics ==
George began his political career in 1992 when he became the parliamentary candidate for the National Democratic Congress (NDC) to represent his constituency in the Brong Ahafo region of Ghana prior to the commencement of the 1992 Ghanaian parliamentary election.

He was sworn into the First Parliament of the Fourth Republic of Ghana on 7 January 1993 after being pronounced winner at the 1992 Ghanaian election held on 29 December 1992.

He lost his candidacy to his fellow party comrade Kwadwo Mama Adams before the commencement of the 1996 Ghanaian general elections. Kwadwo thereafter defeated his counterpart Jarvis Reginald Agyeman-Badu of the New Patriotic Party who polled 29.80% of the total valid votes cast which was equivalent to 15,534 votes while Kwadwo polled 46.30% of the total valid votes cast as well which was equivalent to 24,164 votes.

== Personal life ==
He is a Christian.
