= Koduah =

Koduah is a Ghanaian surname. Notable people with the surname include:

- Justin Koduah (born 1982), Ghanaian lawyer and politician
- Kofi Koduah Sarpong, Ghanaian business executive
- Nana Koduah Kwarteng, Ghanaian politician

== See also ==
- Gideon Kodua (born 2004), Ghanaian footballer
