= John Setuni Achuliwor =

Ghanaian politician (died 2003)

John_Setuni_Achuliwor

MP for Navrongo central
- In office 7 January 2001 – 6 January 2005
- President: John Agyekum Kufour

Personal details
- Born: Navrongo Central, Upper East Region Gold Coast (now Ghana)
- Died: 29 January 2003 Manhyia, Ashanti Region, Ghana
- Party: New Patriotic Party
- Education: University of Cape Coast, Ghana
- Occupation: Politician
- Profession: Agronomist

John Setuni Achuliwor (died 29 January 2003) was a Ghanaian politician and a member of the Third Parliament of the Fourth Republic representing the Navrongo Central constituency in the Upper East Region.

== Early life and education ==
John was born in Navrongo Central in the Upper East Region of Ghana.

== Politics ==
John was first elected into Parliament on the Ticket of the New Patriotic Party during the December 2000 Ghanaian General elections. He Polled 11,246 votes out of the 27,114 valid votes cast representing 41.50%. His constituency was a part of the 7 parliamentary seats out of 12 seats won by the New Patriotic Party in that election in the Upper East Region.The New Patriotic Party won a majority total of 99 parliamentary seats out of 200 seats. He was elected over Clement T. Bugase of the National Democratic Congress, Pwoawuvi J.Weguri of the Peoples National Convention Party, Kaguah A. Castor of the National Reform Party, Frank Awepuga of the Great Consolidated Political Party, Jennifer Anema of the Convention Peoples Party and Margaret A.Pungase of the United Ghana Movement. These secured 11,103, 3,284,604,353, 310 and 214 votes out of the total valid votes cast respectively. These were corresponding to 40.90%,12.10%, 2.20%, 1.30%,1.10% and 0.80% respectively of total valid votes cast.

== Career ==
Achuliwor was a member of parliament (MP) for Navrongo Central and Deputy Minister of Communications and Technology. He worked at ActionAid, from 1993 to 1998, a non-governmental organisation in Ghana and The Gambia. He also was an Agronomist by profession.

== Personal life and death ==
Achuliwor was married to Bridget Ify Achuliwor, and together they had three children.

Achuliwor died from an automobile collision at Manhyia in the Ashanti Region, on 29 January 2003. He was buried at Navrongo on 15 March.
