= Yaw Oppong Kyekyeku =

Ghanaian politician and educationist

Hon. Yaw Oppong Kyekyeku

Member of parliament for Dormaa East constituency
- In office 7 January 1993 – 7 January 1997
- President: Jerry John Rawlings
- Succeeded by: Nicholas K. Adjei- Kyeremeh

Personal details
- Born: 1 September 1947 (age 79)
- Party: National Democratic Congress
- Education: Wesley College, Kumasi
- Occupation: Politician
- Profession: Educationist

Yaw Oppong Kyekyeku (born 1 September 1947) is a Ghanaian politician and educationist. He was a member of the first parliament of the Fourth Republic, and a member of parliament for Dormaa East in the Brong-Ahafo region of Ghana.

== Early life and education ==
Kyekyeku was born in 1947. He attended Wesley College, Kumasi, where he received a teacher training certificate in mathematics.

== Political career ==
He was a member of the National Democratic Congress (NDC). In April 1991 he was dismissed from the Provisional National Defense Council on the grounds of "mental exhaustion", but then returned in July, allowing him to contest the parliamentary primaries. He won these and contested the Dormaa East seat as an NDC candidate. Prior to winning the seat, he was a former district secretary in Afiagya Sekyere in the Ashanti region from 1986 to 1993. He served for one term in parliament, and was replaced by Nicholas K. Adjei-Kyeremeh of the National Democratic Congress who polled 9,103 votes representing 36.10% of the total votes cast. Adjei-Kyeremeh won the seat against Stephen Adoma-Yeboah of the New Patriotic Party (NPP) and Gyabaah Samuel of the People's National Convention whose votes represent 29.60% and 1.40% of the total votes respectively. In 2002 Kyekyeku resigned from the NDC to join the NPP claiming his decision is to make sure: "survival of the new political dispensation by carrying out my capacity building exercise for metropolitan, municipal and district assemblies."

== Personal life ==
Kyekyeku is a Christian.
