= Mavis Nkansah Boadu =

Ghanaian politician (born 1989)

Hon. Mavis Nkansah Boadu
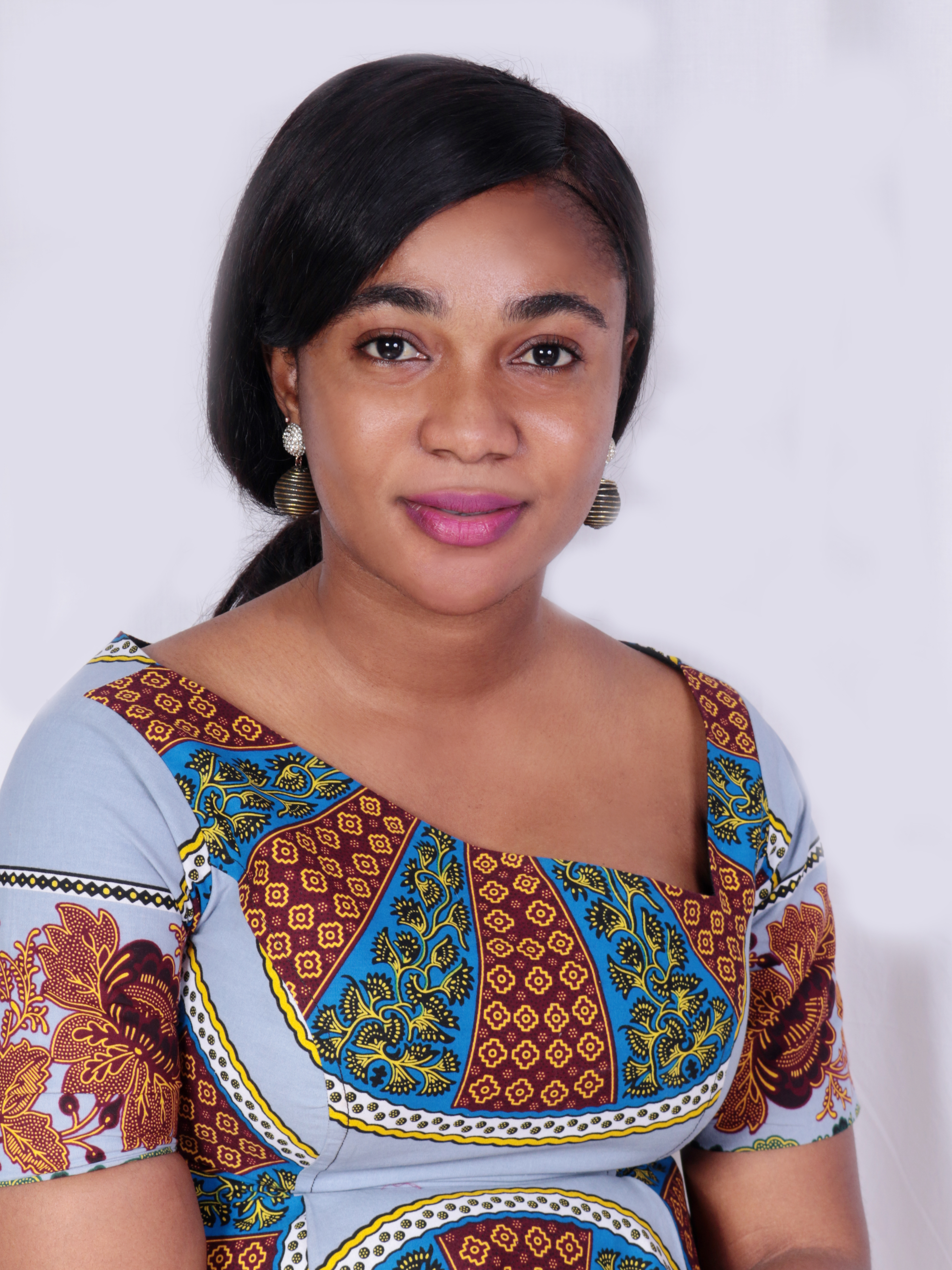

Member of Parliament for Afigya Sekyere East Constituency
- Incumbent
- Assumed office 7 January 2017
- President: Nana Akufo-Addo
- Preceded by: Hennric David Yeboah

Personal details
- Born: 17 May 1989 (age 37) Wiamoase, Ashanti Region
- Party: New Patriotic Party
- Education: Achimota School; DeVry University; University College of Management Studies
- Profession: Businesswoman

Mavis Nkansah Boadu (May 17, 1989) is a Ghanaian politician and the Member of parliament for Afigya Sekyere East constituency in the Ashanti Region in the 7th and 8th parliament of the 4th Republic of Ghana. She is a member of the New Patriotic Party.

== Early life and education ==
Boadu was born on 17 May 1989 in Wiamoase, Ashanti Region. She had her secondary school education at Achimota School. She holds an MBA in International Business from DeVry University (USA) and a master's degree in human resource management from University College of Management Studies.

== Career ==
Boadu was an international student ambassador for DeVry University (New York), from 2015 to 2016. She interned as a human resource assistant for Kinsadus Company LTD from 2012 to 2012.

== Political career ==
In July 2015, Boadu at the age of 26 won the New Patriotic Party's primaries by beating the then incumbent member of parliament the late Hennric David Yeboah who had been in parliament for two terms prior to his lose. She was elected as member of parliament Afigya Sekyere East constituency after obtaining 41,694 votes representing 80.44% against her closest contender Awudu Salim of the National Democratic Congress who obtained 10,141 votes representing 19.56%. She was re-elected in the 2020 General Election to represent in the 8th Parliament of the Fourth Republic of Ghana. In the 7th parliament of the 4th Republic of Ghana, she served on the Foreign Affairs committee and Public committee.

In February 2017, during parliamentary proceedings she demanded for a strict enforcement of road traffic regulations to end carnage on the roads. She added that although the National Road Safety Commission(NSRC) deserves commendation for taking measures to enforce road traffic laws, they need to do more.

== Personal life ==
Boadu is single and a Christian.

== Philanthropy ==
In August 2017, Boadu donated 340 bags of cement to communities in the Afigya Sekyere East Constituency.
