= Gladys Abena Nsoah =

Ghanaian politician

Member of Parliament for Kintampo Constituency
- In office 7 January 1997 – 6 January 2001
- President: Jerry John Rawlings
- Parliamentary group: National Democratic Congress

Personal details
- Born: 25 November 1956 (age 69)
- Occupation: Teacher

Gladys Abena Nsoah is a Ghanaian politician. She was a member of the second parliament of the Fourth Republic of Ghana representing Kintampo constituency. She is a member of the National Democratic Congress.

== Early life ==
Gladys was born on 25 November 1956 in the Brong Ahafo Region of Ghana. She attended Kintampo Milldle School, where she obtained her Middle School Leaving Certificate. She worked as a teacher before going into politics.

== Political career ==
Gladys was elected into the first parliament of the fourth republic of Ghana on 7 January 1993 after she was pronounced winner at the 1992 Ghanaian parliamentary election held on 29 December 1992.

She was re-elected into parliament on 7 January 1997 after she emerged winner at the 1996 Ghanaian General Elections. She defeated Owusu Debrah of the Convention People's Party, James Kwabena Bomfeh of the People's National Convention and Emmanuel Kofi Nsiah Dwomoh of the National Independence Party. Gladys obtained 37.10% of the total valid votes cast which is equivalent to 27,520 votes while her opposition obtained 15.20% which is equivalent to 11,318 votes and 5.50% which is equivalent to 4,067 votes respectively.
