= Philip Basoah =

Ghanaian politician (1969–2023)

Hon. Philip Atta Basoah
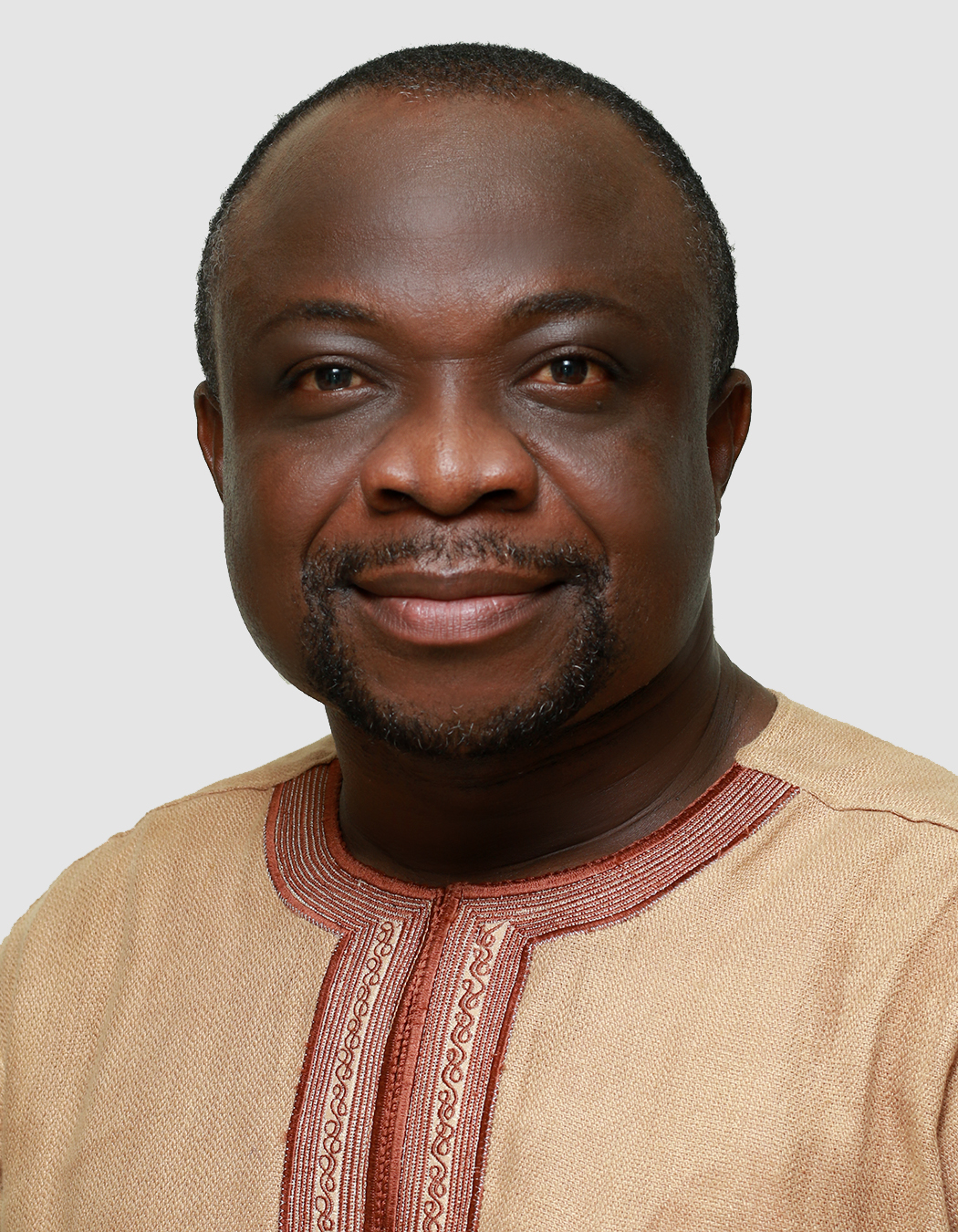

Member of Parliament for Kumawu Constituency
- In office 7 January 2021 – 27 March 2023

Personal details
- Born: Philip Atta Basoah; 18 November 1969 Kumawu, Ghana
- Died: 27 March 2023 (aged 53)
- Party: New Patriotic Party
- Occupation: Politician
- Profession: Tutor
- Committees: Employment, Social Welfare and State Enterprises Committee; Lands and Forestry Committee; Selection Committee

Philip Atta Basoah (18 November 1969 – 27 March 2023) was a Ghanaian politician and member of the Seventh Parliament of the Fourth Republic of Ghana representing the Kumawu Constituency in the Ashanti Region on the ticket of the New Patriotic Party.

== Early life ==
Philip was born on 18 November 1969, and died on Monday, 27 March 2023. He hails from Kumawu in the Ashanti region of Ghana.

== Education ==
He had master's degree at the Paris graduate school of management in 2012 and also had Bachelor of Arts at the University of Cape Coast, Ghana in 2000. He also had his GCE A level in 1994 and his GCE O level in 1991 and his MLSC in 1986.

== Career ==
He was the projects coordinator for Ghana Education Service in the Ashanti Region. He was also the District Chief Executive at the Ministry of Local Government for the Sekyere East District from June 2005 to January 2009. He was a tutor at the Agogo Senior High School.

== Political career ==
He was a member of NPP and the MP for the Kumawu Constituency in the Ashanti region. In the 2016 Ghana general elections, he won the parliamentary seat with 21,794 votes making 78.2% of the total votes cast whilst the NDC parliamentary aspirant Emmanuel William Amoako had 5,899 votes making 21.2% of the total votes cast while the CPP parliament aspirant Opoku Kyei Clifford had 188 votes making 0.7% of the total votes cast. In 2020 Ghana general elections, he won the parliamentary seat with 14,960 votes making 51.1% of the total votes cast whilst the NDC parliamentary aspirant Bernard Opoku Marfo had 2,439 votes making 8.3% of the total votes cast while the Independent parliament aspirant Duah Kwaku had 11,698 votes making 40% of the total votes cast and the GUM parliament aspirant Nana Amoako had 174 votes making 0.6% of the total votes cast.

=== Committees ===
He was the Chairperson for Employment, Social Welfare and State Enterprises Committee and also a member of Lands and Forestry Committee and also a member of the Selection Committee.

== Philanthropy ==
In April 2021, he presented training equipment to artisans in the Kumawu Constituency to aid the youth acquire employable skills.

== Personal life ==
He was a Christian.

== Death ==
Basoah died on 27 March 2023, at the age of 54.
