= Yaw Baah =

Ghanaian politician (born 1959)

Hon. Yaw Baah

Member of Parliament for Kumawu Constituency
- In office 7 January 2009 – 6 January 2013
- President: John Atta Mills; John Mahama

Member of Parliament for Kumawu Constituency
- In office 7 January 2005 – 6 January 2009
- President: John Kufuor

Personal details
- Born: 17 November 1959 (age 66)
- Party: New Patriotic Party
- Children: 2
- Education: University of Ghana, Lincoln's Inn
- Profession: Lawyer

Yaw Baah (born 17 November 1959) is a lawyer and Ghanaian politician of the Republic of Ghana. He was the Member of Parliament representing Kumawu constituency of the Ashanti Region of Ghana in the 4th and 5th Parliament of the 4th Republic of Ghana. He is a member of the New Patriotic Party.

== Early life and education ==
Baah was born on 17 November 1959. He hails from Kumawu, a town in the Ashanti Region of Ghana. He is a product of the University of Ghana (UG). He holds a Bachelor of Arts degree in Economics and Political Science from the university. He acquired the degree in 1986. He is also a product of Lincoln's Inn in London. From there, he acquired a Bachelor of Law in 1997.

== Career ==
Baah is a lawyer by profession. He was the director of Denwest Legal Consultancy Services in London.

== Political career ==
Baah is a member of the New Patriotic Party. He became a member of parliament from January 2005 after emerging winner in the General Election in December 2004. He run for a second term in office. He was the MP for Kumawu constituency in the Ashanti Region of Ghana. He was elected as the member of parliament for this constituency in the fourth and fifth parliament of the fourth Republic of Ghana.

== Elections ==
Baah was elected as the member of parliament for the Kumawu constituency of the Ashanti Region of Ghana for the first time in the 2004 Ghanaian general elections. He won on the ticket of the New Patriotic Party. His constituency was a part of the 36 parliamentary seats out of 39 seats won by the New Patriotic Party in that election for the Ashanti Region. The New Patriotic Party won a majority total of 128 parliamentary seats out of 230 seats. He was elected with 19,223 votes out of 27,477 total valid votes cast. This was equivalent to 70% of total valid votes cast. He was elected over George Amankwaa of the National Democratic Congress, Kofi Adu Poku of the Convention People's Party, Yaw Opoku Mensah of the Great Consolidated Popular Party and Patrick Osei Aboagye an independent candidate. These obtained 5,680, 1,831, 187 and 556 votes respectively out of total valid votes cast. These were equivalent to 20.7%, 6.7%, 0.7% and 2% respectively of total valid votes cast.

In 2008, he won the general elections on the ticket of the New Patriotic Party for the same constituency. His constituency was part of the 34 parliamentary seats out of 39 seats won by the New Patriotic Party in that election for the Ashanti Region. The New Patriotic Party won a minority total of 109 parliamentary seats out of 230 seats. He was elected with 15;217 votes out of 26;980 total valid votes cast. This was equivalent to 56.4% of total valid votes cast. He was elected over Ohene Kwasi Agyemang of the National Democratic Congress, Yaw Opoku Mensah of Democratic Freedom Party, Kofi Adu Poku of the Convention People's Party and Dominic Oteng an independent candidate. These obtained 4,278, 174, 191 and 7,120 votes of the total valid votes cast. These were equivalent to 15.86%,0.64%, 0.71 and 26.39% respectively of the total votes cast.

== Personal life ==
Baah is a Christian. He is a member of the Methodist Church. He is married with two children.

== See also ==
- List of MPs elected in the 2004 Ghanaian parliamentary election
- List of MPs elected in the 2008 Ghanaian parliamentary election
