= Joseph E.K. Abekah =

Ghanaian politician

Member of parliament for Effia-Kwesimintsim Constituency
- In office 7 January 1997 – 6 January 2001
- President: John Jerry Rawlings

Personal details
- Party: National Democratic Congress
- Occupation: Politician

Joseph E.K. Abekah is a Ghanaian politician who was the member of parliament for the Effia-Kwesimintsim constituency in the second Ghanaian parliament of the 4th republic of Ghana.

== Politics ==
Abekah was elected to represent Effia-Kwesimintsim in the 1996 Ghanaian general elections. on the ticket of the People's Convention Party. He took over from James Mike Abban of the National Convention Party. Mahama lost his seat to Joe Baidoo Ansah of the New Patriotic Party in the subsequent elections of 2000.

== Elections ==
Abekah was elected with 34,958 votes out of 56,701 valid votes cast representing 61.65% of the total valid votes cast. He was elected over Ebenezer Kofi Quansah of the New Patriotic Party, Abdulai Mohammed Seidu of the National Democratic Congress and S. A. B. Ackah of the People's National Convention. These obtained 0%, 30.25% and 8.1% respectively of the total valid votes cast.
