= Emil Kwadzo Brantuo =

Ghanaian politician

Hon. Emil Kwadzo Brantuo
- In office 7 January 1993 – 7 January 1997
- President: Jerry John Rawlings
- Preceded by: Monica P. Atenkah
- Succeeded by: Henry Ford Kamel
- In office 7 January 1997 – 7 January 2001

Member of Parliament for Buem Constituency
- In office 7 January 2001 – 6 January 2005
- President: John Kufuor

Personal details
- Born: 31 January 1938 (age 88)
- Party: National Democratic Congress
- Education: National Certificate of Agriculture College
- Occupation: Politician
- Profession: Agriculturist

Emil Kwadzo Brantuo was a Ghanaian politician and a member of the 1st, 2nd and 3rd parliament of the 4th republic of Ghana. He is a former member of Parliament for the Buem constituency in the Oti Region and a founding member of the National Democratic Congress political Party in Ghana.

== Early life and education ==
Emil Kwadzo Brantuo was born on 31 January 1938. He attended the National Certificate of Agriculture College and obtained a Certificate in Agriculture.

== Career ==
Emil Kwadzo Brantuo is an Agriculturist.

== Politics ==
Brantuo served from 1993 to 2005 thereby being a member in the 1st, 2nd and 3rd parliament of the 4th republic of Ghana. He was a member of the National Democratic Congress and a representative of the Buem constituency of the Volta Region of Ghana. His political career began when he contested in the 1992 Ghanaian parliamentary election, after in 1996 Ghanaian General elections and won on the ticket of the National Democratic Congress. He was preceded by Monica P. Atenkah.

During the 1996 Elections, he polled 15,623 votes out of the 24,744 valid votes cast representing 50.50% over his opponents Sosthenes Simon Sakyi of the IND who polled 7,722 representing 25.00%, Bani Nyarko Agyemang Charles of the NPP who polled 1,186 votes representing 3.80%, Nayo Rockson of the NCP who polled 114 votes representing 0.40% and Bobison Emmanuel Kwaku of the PNC who polled 99 representing 0.30%.

=== 2000 Elections ===
Brantuo was elected as the member of parliament for the Buem constituency in the 2000 Ghanaian general elections. He won the elections on the ticket of the National Democratic Congress. His constituency was a part of the 17 parliamentary seats out of 19 seats won by the National Democratic Congress in that election for the Volta Region.

The National Democratic Congress won a minority total of 92 parliamentary seats out of 200 seats in the 3rd parliament of the 4th republic of Ghana. He was elected with 9,610 votes out of 20,219 total valid votes cast. This was equivalent to 48.8% of the total valid votes cast.

He was elected over Adjei Richard Kwadwo an independent candidate, Ernest A. Yeboah of the National Reformed Party, Sosthenes S. Sakyi of the Convention People's Party, Sam Baidu Kelele of the New Patriotic Party, Nyame Manasseh Ebun of the United Ghana Movement and Donkor S. Kwamena of the People's National Convention.

These obtained 4,578, 2,356, 1,500, 1,386, 144 and 110 votes respectively out of the total valid votes cast. These were equivalent to 23.3%, 12%, 7.6%, 7%, 0.7% and 0.6% respectively of total valid votes cast.

In 2000 he was not present at the political forum organized by the Jasikan Amalgamated Civic Union Education Group to present his manifestos and issues of development.

== Personal life ==
He is a Christian.

== See also ==
- List of MPs elected in the 2000 Ghanaian parliamentary election
