= Margaret Clarke-Kwestie =

Ghanaian politician

Hon. Magaret Clarke-kwestie

Member of the Ghana Parliament for Ga South
- Incumbent
- Assumed office 7 January 1997

Minister of State

Deputy Minister for Health and Education
- President: Jerry Rawlings

Personal details
- Born: Ghana
- Party: National Democratic Congress
- Education: Wesley Grammar School
- Occupation: Former minister of state, member of parliament and diplomat

Margaret Clarke-Kwesie is a former Ghanaian politician and Deputy Minister of Health from 1993 to 2001 under the Rawlings government. In the 1996 General Elections held in Ghana, she won the seat as the Member of Parliament for Ga South Constituency under the flag of the National Democratic Congress with 52.20%.

== Early life and education ==
Clarke-Kwestie is a Ghanaian and was a Principal Economic Planning Officer at the Ministry of Finance & Economic Planning before entering into politics as a Member of Parliament for Ga South constituency, a former Deputy Minister of Health and Education and also Minister of State at the Office of the President who attended Wesley Grammar school. Clarke-Kwestie served on the boards of the Oil Research Institute, the Scientific Instrumentation Centre of CSIR and the GIHOC Cannery of Nsawam. She has been on the board of EIC since 1984. Clarke-Kwesie became Ghana's Ambassador to the Republic of South Korea in the year 2009. She was also the a Director of Enterprise Group and a Board of Enterprise Group Limited.

== Politics ==
Clarke-Kwestie was first elected as a member of parliament for the Ga South constituency in the Greater Accra region of Ghana during the 1996 Ghanaian general elections on the ticket of the National Democratic Congress hence making her a member of the second parliament of the fourth republic of Ghana. She was elected with a total valid vote cast of 49,758. This was equivalent to 52.20% of the total valid votes cast. She was elected over Eric Busby Quartey-Papafio of the National Democratic Congress, Jesse Nii Adu Commey Randol of the Convention People's Party, Daniel Addoquaye Pappoe of the People's National Convention and Amekah Kwadzo John of the Great Consolidated Popular Party. These Obtained 19,180, 3,092, 2,416 and 1,485 votes respectively out of the total valid votes cast. these were equivalent to 20.10%, 3.20%, 2.50% and 1.60% respectively of the total valid votes.
