= Navrongo Central (Ghana parliament constituency) =

Constituency in Ghana

- constituency for the Parliament of Ghana
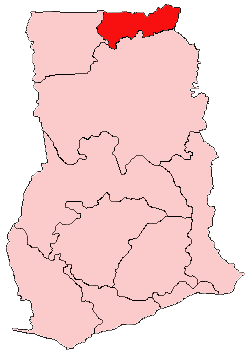
- District: Kassena/Nankana District
- Region: Upper East Region of Ghana

Current constituency
- Party: National Democratic Congress
- MP: Simon Akibange Aworigo

Navrongo Central is one of the constituencies represented in the Parliament of Ghana. It elects one Member of Parliament (MP) by the first past the post system of election. Simon Akibange Aworigo is the member of parliament for the constituency. Navrongo Central is located in the Kassena/Nankana district of the Upper East Region of Ghana.

== Boundaries ==
The seat is located entirely within the Kassena/Nankana district of the Upper East Region of Ghana.

== Members of Parliament ==
Election	Member	Party
1992	Godfrey Abullu	National Democratic Congress
1995	John Setuni Achuliwor	Independent
1996	Clement Tumfuga Bugase	National Democratic Congress
2000	John Setuni Achuliwor	New Patriotic Party
2003	Joseph Kofi Adda	New Patriotic Party
2012	Mark Owen Woyongo	National Democratic Congress
2016		
2020		
2024		

== Elections ==
2012 Ghanaian parliamentary election: Navrongo Central Source:Electoral Commission of Ghana
Party	Candidate	Votes	%	±%
National Democratic Congress	Mark Owen Woyongo	17,907	53.16	11.46
New Patriotic Party	Joseph Kofi Adda	15,443	45.84	+0.64
Progressive People's Party	Avankawa Awupuri Crispen	336	1.0	—
Majority		2,464	7.32	+3.82
Turnout		34,469	76.71	—

2008 Ghanaian parliamentary election: Navrongo Central Source:Ghana Home Page
Party	Candidate	Votes	%	±%
New Patriotic Party	Joseph Kofi Adda	14,354	45.2	+5.9
National Democratic Congress	Mark Owen Woyongo	13,224	41.7	+22.1
People's National Convention	Gabriel Pwamang	4,026	12.7	−7.9
Convention People's Party	Anuga Fortunate	133	0.4	0.0
Majority		1,130	3.5	−15.2
Turnout				

2004 Ghanaian parliamentary election: Navrongo Central Source:National Electoral Commission, Ghana
Party	Candidate	Votes	%	±%
New Patriotic Party	Joseph Kofi Adda	12,444	39.3	−18.6
People's National Convention	Gabriel Pwamang	6,512	20.6	+3.0
National Democratic Congress	Emmanuel Andema	6,201	19.6	−3.8
Independent	Abdallah Werseh Achuliwor	4,015	12.7	—
Independent	Donald Amoah	2,262	7.1	—
Convention People's Party	Jennifer Azantilow	140	0.4	—
Democratic People's Party	Grace Bagoniah	83	0.3	−0.8
Majority		5,932	18.7	−15.8
Turnout		32,778	84.3	+34.3

Joseph Kofi Adda (NPP) won the by-election held on 25 March 2003 by a majority of 7271, following the death of John Setuni Achuliwor (NPP) who died on 29 January 2003 after a road traffic accident on 25 January 2003.

Navrongo Central by-election, 2003 Source:Ghana Home Page
Party	Candidate	Votes	%	±%
New Patriotic Party	Joseph Kofi Adda	12,200	57.9	+16.4
National Democratic Congress	Clement Tumfugah Bugase	4,929	23.4	−17.5
People's National Convention	Gabriel Pwamang	3,705	17.6	+5.5
Democratic People's Party	Grace Bagoniah	241	1.1	—
Majority		7,271	34.5	+33.9
Turnout		21,933	50.0	

2000 Ghanaian parliamentary election: Navrongo Central Source:Adam Carr's Election Archives
Party	Candidate	Votes	%	±%
New Patriotic Party	John Setuni Achuliwor	11,246	41.5	−6.6
National Democratic Congress	Clement Tumfugah Bugase	11,103	40.9	−11.0
People's National Convention	Pwoawuvi J. Weguri	3,284	12.1	—
National Reform Party	Kaguah A. Castor	604	2.2	—
Great Consolidated Popular Party	Frank Awepuga	353	1.3	—
Convention People's Party	Jennifer Anemana	310	1.1	—
United Ghana Movement	Margaret A. Punguse	214	0.8	—
Majority		143	0.6	—

1996 Ghanaian parliamentary election: Navrongo Central Source:Electoral Commission of Ghana
Party	Candidate	Votes	%	±%
National Democratic Congress	Clement Tumfugah Bugase	16,811	51.9	+4.0
New Patriotic Party	John Setuni Achuliwor	15,599	48.1	—
Majority		1,212	3.8	—
Turnout		33,883	82.9	

Navrongo Central by-election, 1995 Source:Electoral Commission of Ghana
Party	Candidate	Votes	%	±%
Independent	John Setuni Achuliwor	6,995	49.3	
National Democratic Congress	Clement Tumfugah Bugase	6,799	47.9	
EGLE	Coleman E. Nambuisi	394	2.8	
Majority		196	1.4	

== See also ==
- List of Ghana Parliament constituencies
