= John Jagri Kokpahi =

Ghanaian politician

Member of parliament for Zabzugu/Tatale Constituency
- In office 7 January 1997 – 6 January 2001
- President: John Jerry Rawlings

Personal details
- Born: 6 May 1956 Zabzugu/Tatale, Northern Region, Ghana
- Party: National Democratic Congress
- Education: Tamale Nurses College
- Occupation: Politician
- Profession: General nurse

John Jagri Kokpahi (born 6 May 1956) is a Ghanaian politician and a member of the Second Parliament of the Fourth Republic Representing the Zabzugu/Tatale Constitiency in the Northern Region of Ghana.

== Early life and education ==
John was born on 6 May 1956 at Tatale in the Northern Region of Ghana. He attended the Tamale Nursing Training College and obtained his Certificate in General Nursing.

== Career ==
John is a general nurse by profession aside being a former Ghanaian politician.

== Politics ==
John was first elected into parliament on the ticket of the National Democratic Congress representing the Zabzugu/Tatale Constitiency in the Northern Region of Ghana during the December 1996 Ghanaian general elections. He polled 15,717 votes out of the 24,112 valid votes cast representing 44.40%, Mohamed Dramani of the New Patriotic Party who polled 5,437 votes representing15.30% and Jacob Nasanpi Nwulu who polled 2,958 votes representing 8.40%. He won in the 2000 Ghanaian General Elections with 8,237 votes representing 35.80%. He won again in 2004 with 16,543 votes representing 50.90 over Jabaah John Bennam who polled 15,555 representing 47.80% and Adam Kuperi Lagnaboon who polled 433 votes representing 1.30%.
