= Davit Kodua =

Georgian politician

- დავით კოდუა

Member of the Parliament of Georgia
- In office 2024 (11th convocation) – 29 October 2025
- Constituency: Zugdidi delegate

Mayor of Zugdidi
- Incumbent
- Assumed office October 2025

Personal details
- Born: 1985 (age 40–41) (approx.)
- Party: Georgian Dream

Davit Kodua (Georgian: დავით კოდუა) is a Georgian politician who served as a member of the Parliament of Georgia for the ruling Georgian Dream—Democratic Georgia party. His parliamentary term ended in October 2025 following his election as Mayor of Zugdidi.

== Career ==
Kodua was elected as a Member of Parliament in the 2024 parliamentary elections, representing Zugdidi as a delegate for the Georgian Dream party. He served in the 11th parliament until his mandate was terminated. In the partially boycotted local elections of October 2025, Kodua was elected Mayor of Zugdidi, securing 88.8% of the vote according to official results. Under parliamentary rules, holding the mayoral office is incompatible with a parliamentary mandate. On 29 October 2025, the Parliament of Georgia voted to approve the pre-term termination of his powers; 75 MPs supported the resolution. He was succeeded in parliament by Zurab Kadagidze of the People's Power party.

== Legal issues ==
In 2025, Kodua was arrested on charges of domestic violence. According to reports, the Ministry of Internal Affairs of Georgia launched an investigation under Article 126 of the criminal code following allegations that Kodua abused his wife and daughter.
