= Joseph Ghansah =

Ghanaian politician

Member of parliament for Tarkwa-Nsuaem Constituency
- In office 7 January 1997 – 6 January 2001
- President: John Jerry Rawlings
- Preceded by: Mathew Kojo Kum

Personal details
- Born: Tarkwa-Nsuaem, Western Region Ghana)
- Party: People's Convention Party
- Occupation: Politician

Joseph Ghansah is a Ghanaian politician and a Member of the Second Parliament of the Fourth Republic representing the Tarkwa-Nsuaem Constituency in the Western Region of Ghana.

== Early life ==
Ghansah was born at Tarkwa-Nsuaem in the Western Region of Ghana.

== Politics ==
Ghansah was first elected into Parliament on the ticket of the People's Convention Party for the Tarkwa-Nsuaem Constituency in the Western Region of Ghana during the December 1996 Ghanaian general elections. He contested and won the election with 24,718 of the total votes against Mr. John Aidoo of the National Convention Party who obtained 1,622 votes, Mr. Joe Arthur of the National Democratic Congress who obtained 15,012 votes and Rose Esi Amoah of the New Patriotic Party. On his attempt to secure a second term in office, He was defeated by Gifty Eugenia Kwofie of the New Patriotic Party in the 2000 Ghanaian general elections. He succeeded Mathew Kojo Kum of the National Democratic Congress in office and served only one term as a Parliamentarian.
