= George Kofi Nfodjoh =

Ghanaian politician

MP for Ho Central
- Incumbent
- Assumed office 7 January 2005
- President: John Dramani Mahama

Personal details
- Born: 21 September 1946 (age 80) Sokode, Volta Region Ghana)
- Party: National Democratic Congress
- Education: University of Ghana, Ghana
- Occupation: Politician
- Profession: Journalist

George Kofi Nfodjoh is a Ghanaian politician who served as the member of parliament for the 4th parliament of the 4th republic of Ghana. He represented the National Democratic Congress of the Ho Central Constituency.

== Early life and education ==
He was born on 21 September 1946. He hails from Sokode-Bagble a town in the Volta Region of Ghana. He obtained his PGD in Communication Studies from the University of Ghana in 1986.

== Career ==
He is a Journalist and an advertiser. He worked with AGC Limited in Obuasi from 1987 to 1997. He was the District Chief Executive of the Ho District from 1997 to 2001. He was a captain and worked with the Public Relations Department of the Ghana Armed Forces.

== Politics ==
He is a member of the National Democratic Congress. He was the member of parliament for Ho Central constituency in the Volta region of Ghana. He was elected as the National Democratic Congress Parliamentary Candidate on Friday 2004 for the Ho-Central constituency.

He had a total vote count of 49,463 in a percentage of 84.80% to defeat his opponents who were Seth Dickie Kpodo with 4,668 votes, Dede Kwesi Levi Michael with 3,593 votes, Asare Roberta with 275 and Tay Prosper with 302 votes.

== Personal life ==
He is married. He is a Christian and a member of the Catholic Church.
