= Tweneboa Kodua Senior High School =

Senior High School in Ghana

Tweneboa Kodua Senior High School, established by Ghana's first president, Osagyefo Dr. Kwame Nkrumah, is a second cycle institution found in the township of Kumawu in the Ashanti Region. The school is mixed-sex and was opened in 1959.

== History ==
Tweneboa Kodua Senior High School was established during the administration of Ghana's first president, Osagyefo Dr. Kwame Nkrumah as part of the Ghana Education Trust programme to expand secondary education in the country. The foundation stone for the school was laid on 20 August 1959 by Krobo Edusei, then minister of Transport and Communications. The school admitted its first cohort of 45 male students in January 1960 and became co-educational during 1969-70 academic year.

== School Motto ==
The motto of the school is "Knowledge and Sacrifice"

== Courses ==
- Agriculture
- Business
- Home Economics
- Visual Arts
- General Science

== School Facilities ==
Some school facilities include; Administration Block, Science Lab, Assembly Hall, Dormitory Block, Visual Arts Studio, Bungalows, Dining Hall and ICT Lab.

== Other School Details ==
University Acceptance Rate	19%
Category:	B
Type:	Public
Gender:	Mixed
Status:	Day/Boarding
Number of Programs:	6
Location:	Kumawu
School Code:	0051802
