= Kweku Boateng-Lovinger =

Ghanaian politician

Kweku Boateng Lovinger

Member of parliament for Brim North Constituency
- In office 7 January 1997 – 6 January 2001
- President: John Jerry Rawlings

Personal details
- Born: Brim North, Eastern Region, Ghana
- Party: National Democratic Congress
- Occupation: Politician

Kweku Boateng-Lovinger is a Ghanaian politician and member of the Second Parliament of the Fourth Republic representing the Brim North Constituency in the Eastern Region of Ghana.

== Early life ==
Kweku was born at Brim North in the Eastern Region of Ghana.

== Politics ==
Kweku was first elected into Parliament on the Ticket of the National Democratic Congress for the Brim North Constituency in the Eastern Region of Ghana during the December 1996 Ghanaian General Elections. He polled 20,737 votes out of the 44,630 valid votes cast representing 36.00% over his opponents Owusu Agyekum of the Convention people's Party who polled 12,139 votes representing 21.10%, Victor Biscoff Owusu Ahinkorah of the New Patriotic Party who polled 11,306 votes representing 19.60%, Agyenim Boateng who polled 448 votes representing 0.80% and Alex Oduro-Ampadu who polled 0 votes. He lost in his Party's Parliamentary Primaries to Grace Omaboe.
