= Abena Asuamah Oppong =

Ghanaian judge

Abena Asuamah Oppong is a Ghanaian judge. In 2025, she was sworn in a Justice of the Appeals Court by John Mahama along with 20 others.

== Biography ==
In December 2019, Oppong was sworn in as a High Court Judge by Nana Akuffo-Addo.

In August 2024, she was a Justice of High Court in Accra and spoke on the topic Land Acquisition in Ghana: The Processes and All You Need to Know during a legal outreach program in the Western Region of Ghana.

In January 2025, she administered the induction oath to students of the Ghana School of Law. In May 2025, she also sworn in council members of the Ministerial Advisory Board of the Ministry of Foreign Affairs.
