= Ahmed Musah =

Ghanaian politician

MP for Asokwa East
- In office 7 January 1997 – 6 January 2001
- President: John Jerry Rawlings

Personal details
- Born: Asokwa East, Ashanti Region, Ghana
- Party: National Democratic Congress
- Occupation: Politician

Ahmed Musah is a Ghanaian politician and a member of the Second Parliament of the Fourth Republic representing the Asokwa East constituency in the Ashanti Region of Ghana.

== Early life and education ==
Musah was born in Asokwa East in the Ashanti Region of Ghana.

== Politics ==
Musah was elected into Parliament on the Ticket of the National Democratic Congress during the December 2000 Ghanaian General Elections for the Asokwa East Constituency in the Ashanti Region of Ghana. He defeated Othman Baba Yahya, a National Congress Party member by 30,382 votes out of the 84,111 valid votes cast representing 26.70%. He was defeated by Dr. Edward Baffoe Bonne a New Patriotic Party member who polled 45,482 out of the 78,029 valid votes cast representing 58.30%. He served for only one term as a parliamentarian.

== Career ==
Musah is a Ghanaian politician who served as the Member of Parliament for the Asokwa East Constituency in the Ashanti Region of Ghana from 1997 to 2001.
