= Pius M. G. Griffiths =

Ghanaian politician (born 1945)

Member of the Ghana Parliament for Afigya Sekyere East
- In office 7 January 1993 – 6 January 1997
- President: Jerry John Rawlings
- Preceded by: New
- Succeeded by: Kwesi Akomia Kyeremateng

Personal details
- Born: 20 December 1945 (age 80) Kumasi, Ashanti Region
- Education: Opoku Ware School
- Alma mater: University of Poona
- Occupation: Politician

Pius M. G. Griffiths (born 20 December 1945) was a member of the parliament of Ghana.

Griffiths held the title of Deputy Minister of Communications in the Rawlings government with responsibility for information technology. In 2000 he was Deputy Minister of Trade and Industry. He was also MP for Afigya Sekyere East constituency from January 1993 to January 1997.

== Early life and education ==
Griffiths was born on 20 December 1945 in Kumasi. He attended Opoku Ware School and later obtained his Master of Science degree in Mechanical Engineering from the University of Poona.

== Politics ==
He assumed office as a member of the 1st parliament of the 4th republic on 7 January 1993 after he emerged winner at the 1992 Ghanaian parliamentary election held on 29 December 1992. While in office, he served as the deputy Minister for Communications responsible for Information Technology. In 2000, he was appointed deputy Minister for Trade and Industry.
