= Kwesi Akomia Kyeremateng =

Ghanaian politician

Member of the Ghana Parliament for Afigya Sekyere East
- In office 7 January 1997 – 6 January 2009
- Preceded by: Pius M. G. Griffiths
- Succeeded by: Hennric David Yeboah

Personal details
- Born: Ashanti Region Ghana)
- Party: New Patriotic Party
- Occupation: Politician

Kwesi Akomia Kyeremateng was a member of the Ghanaian parliament who represented Afigya-Sekyere East in the Ashanti Region of Ghana from the 1996 general election to the 2008 general election. He is a member of the New Patriotic Party who represented the 2nd, 3rd and 4th Parliament.

== Politics ==
Akomia was first elected into Parliament during the December 1996 Ghanaian General Elections on the Ticket of the New Patriotic Party representing the Afigya-Sekyere East Constituency in the Ashanti Region of Ghana. He polled 18,500 votes out of the 29,734 valid votes cast representing 46.30% against Pious Mercilus G. Griffiths an National Democratic Congress (NDC) member who polled 11,234 votes. He was re-elected into Parliament in 2000 with 26,162 votes out of the 36,276 valid votes cast representing 71.70% against Edward O. Aboagye an NDC member who polled 8,935 representing 24.50%, Dorothy Gifty Antwi a Convention People's Party (CPP) member who polled 451 votes representing 1.20%, Ernest A. Boadu a NRP member who polled 421 votes representing 1.20%, Emmanuel A. Gyasi a UGM member who polled 307 votes representing 0.80% and Kwakwa Amoah a PNC member who polled 213 votes representing 0.60%
