= Afigya Sekyere East (Ghana parliament constituency) =

Constituency in the Ashanti Region of Ghana

- constituency for the Parliament of Ghana
- District: Afigya-Sekyere District
- Region: Ashanti Region of Ghana

Current constituency
- Party: New Patriotic Party
- MP: Mavis Nkansah Boadu

Afigya Sekyere East is one of the constituencies represented in the Parliament of Ghana. It elects one Member of Parliament (MP) by the first past the post system of election. Afigya Sekyere East is located in the Afigya-Sekyere district of the Ashanti Region of Ghana.

== Boundaries ==
The seat is located within the Afigya-Sekyere District of the Ashanti Region of Ghana.

== Members of Parliament ==
| Election | Member | Party |
|---|---|---|
| 1992 | Pius M G Griffiths | National Democratic Congress |
| 1996 | Kwesi Akomia Kyeremateng | New Patriotic Party |
| 2004 | Hennric David Yeboah | New Patriotic Party |
| 2008 | Hennric David Yeboah | New Patriotic Party |
| 2012 | Hennric David Yeboah | New Patriotic Party |
| 2016 | Mavis Nkansah Boadu | New Patriotic Party |

== Elections ==
2008 Ghanaian parliamentary election: Afigya Sekyere East Source: Ghana Home Page
| Party | Candidate | Votes | % | ±% |
|---|---|---|---|---|
| New Patriotic Party | Hennric David Yeboah | 33,080 | 76.1 | |
| National Democratic Congress | Edward Ayarkwah | 9,401 | 21.6 | |
| Convention People's Party | Obeng Nyantakyi Clement | 620 | 1.4 | |
| People's National Convention | Osman Isshak | 257 | 0.6 | |
| Democratic People's Party | Amidu Alhaji Adam | 127 | 0.3 | |
| Majority | | 23,679 | 54.5 | |

== See also ==
- List of Ghana Parliament constituencies
