= Kwadwo Mama Adams =

Ghanaian politician

Alhaji Kwadwo Mahama Adams

Member of parliament for Techiman South Constituency
- In office 7 January 1997 – 6 January 2001
- President: John Jerry Rawlings
- Preceded by: George Kwabena Owusu

Personal details
- Born: Bamiri, Techiman South, Bono East Region Ghana)
- Died: suhum
- Party: National Democratic Congress
- Occupation: Politician
- Profession: Deputy minister
- Website: ayooghana.com

Alhaji Kwadwo Mahama Adams was a Ghanaian politician and a member of the Second Parliament of the Fourth Republic representing the Techiman South Constituency in the Brong Ahafo region of Ghana.

== Early life ==
Father: Alhaji Kofi Adam Mother: Memuna Yaa Amponsah Adams was born in Bamiri a suburb of Techiman South in the Brong Ahafo Region of Ghana.

== Politics ==
Adams was first elected into Parliament on the ticket of the National Democratic Congress during the December 1996 Ghanaian general election for the Techiman South Constituency. He polled 24,164 votes out of the 39,698 valid votes cast representing 46.30% over Jarvis Reginald Agyeman-Badu of the New Patriotic Party who polled 15,534 votes representing 29.80%.

== Career ==
Alhaji Kwadwo Mahama Adam was one of the founding fathers of the NDC. During the formation of the Party, The Akatamanso, the Umbrella which is the symbol of victory for the NDC is the Brainwork of Alhaji Kwadwo Mahama Adam. Aside being a former member of Parliament for the Techiman South Constituency. He was a Deputy Minister for Brong Ahafo Region. And later became the regional Chairman of the NDC in the Brong Ahafo Region

== Death ==
Adams was killed in a motor accident when the vehicle he was driving from Accra to Sunyani was involved in an accident with a tipper truck near Suhum. His body was taken to the Korle-Bu Teaching Hospital for autopsy. He died on 7 September 2002.
