= Ho Central =

Constituency in Ghana

- constituency for the Parliament of Ghana
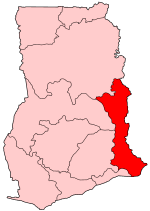
- District: Ho Municipal District
- Region: Volta Region of Ghana

Current constituency
- Party: National Democratic Congress
- MP: Richmond Edem Kofi Kpotosu

Ho Central is one of the constituencies represented in the Parliament of Ghana. It elects one Member of Parliament (MP) by the first past the post system of election. Richmond Edem Kofi Kpotosu. Ho Central is located in the Ho Municipal district of the Volta Region of Ghana.

== Boundaries ==
The seat is located entirely within the Ho Municipal district of the Volta Region of Ghana.more details here

== Members of Parliament ==
First elected	Member	Party
1992	Vincent Kofi Darkey-Mensah	National Convention Party
1996	Kofi Attor	National Democratic Congress
2004	George Kofi Nfodjoh	National Democratic Congress
2012	Benjamin Komla Kpodo	National Democratic Congress
2024	Edem Richmond Kofi Kpotosu	National Democratic Congress

== Elections ==
2024 Ghanaian general election: Ho Central
Party	Candidate	Votes	%	±%
NDC	Edem Richmond Kofi Kpotosu	61,138	91.71	+6.68
NPP	Bosson R.K Divine	5,530	8.29	−4.44
Independent	Mawulorm Kwame Klutse	0	0.00	—
NDP	Vide Nelson Kofi	0	0.00	−0.56
Majority		20,093	65.28	−7.02
Turnout		—	—	—
Registered electors		—		

List of MPs elected in the 2020 Ghanaian general election:Ho Central
Party	Candidate	Votes	%	±%
National Democratic Congress	Benjamin Komla Kpodo	67,180	85.03	+5.55
New Patriotic Party	Proper Kofi Pi-Bansa	10,061	12.73	+2.6
People's National Convention	Daniel Ferdinand Tettey	776	0.98	+0.66
Liberal Party of Ghana	Emmanuel Kwaku Azar	549	0.69	
National Democratic Party	Rejoice Makeba Aku Bribi	439	0.56	
Majority		57,119	72.3	+2.95
Turnout				
Registered electors		102,696		

MPs elected in the Ghanaian parliamentary election, 2016: Ho Central Source:GhanaWeb
Party	Candidate	Votes	%	±%
National Democratic Congress	Benjamin Komla Kpodo	47,330	79.48	−9.03
New Patriotic Party	Ernest Yao Gaewu	6,031	10.13	+0.18
Independent	Edwin Tukpeyi	5065	8.51	+8.1
Progressive People's Party	Adediah Confidence Korbla	673	1.13	+0.67
Convention People's Party	Tay Perry	259	0.43	−0.24
People's National Convention	Franklin Kordzo Amudzi	189	0.32	
Majority		41,299	69.35	
Turnout		59,547		

MPs elected in the Ghanaian parliamentary election, 2012: Ho Central Source:GhanaWeb
Party	Candidate	Votes	%	±%
National Democratic Congress	Benjamin Komla Kpodo	60,129	88.51	+1.51
New Patriotic Party	Archibald Yao Letsa	6,758	9.95	−1.55
Convention People's Party	Beauty Kwampah	452	0.67	−0.03
Progressive People's Party	Hugh Adzomani	312	0.46	
Independent	Godisgood Amegashie	280	0.41	
Majority		53,371		
Turnout		67,931		

MPs elected in the Ghanaian parliamentary election, 2008: Ho Central Source:GhanaWeb
Party	Candidate	Votes	%	±%
National Democratic Congress	Capt (Rtd) George Kofi Nfojoh	47,036	87	+2.2
New Patriotic Party	Archibald Yao Letsa	6,228	11.5	+3.5
People's National Convention	Diana Kafui Nana	404	0.7	
Convention People's Party	Osei Moses Ernest Kwasi	371	0.7	−5.5
Democratic Freedom Party	Manfred Nuku-Dei	0	0	
Majority		40,808		
Turnout				

2004 Ghanaian parliamentary election: Ho Central Source:National Electoral Commission, Ghana
Party	Candidate	Votes	%	±%
National Democratic Congress	Capt (rtd.) George Kofi Nfodjoh	49,463	84.8	1.5
New Patriotic Party	Seth Dickie Kpodo	4,660	8.0	−0.5
Convention People's Party	Michael Kwasi Levi Dedey	3,593	6.2	1.2
Every Ghanaian Living Everywhere	Ms Roberta Asasey	375	0.6	—
Great Consolidated Popular Party	Prosper Tay	302	0.5	—
Majority		44,803	76.8	2.0
Turnout		58,675	87.2	—

2000 Ghanaian parliamentary election: Ho Central Source:Adam Carr's Election Archives
Party	Candidate	Votes	%	±%
National Democratic Congress	Kofi Attor	37,131	83.3	−6.2
New Patriotic Party	John N. K. Akorli	3,812	8.5	6.1
Convention People's Party	Eli Kotoku Eliikem	2,228	5.0	—
National Reform Party	Cousin Doamekpor	1,043	2.3	—
United Ghana Movement	Mathias Sinbad Adom	238	0.5	—
People's National Convention	Alfa Anas Hamidu	110	0.2	−0.9
Majority		33,319	74.8	−10.4

1996 Ghanaian parliamentary election: Ho Central Source:Electoral Commission of Ghana
Party	Candidate	Votes	%	±%
National Democratic Congress	Kofi Attor	49,999	90.5	—
New Patriotic Party	Geoffrey Quarshie Dzormeku	2,914	5.3	—
National Convention Party	John N.K Akorli	1,342	2.4	—
People's Convention Party	Alex Kyere Odikro	634	1.1	—
People's National Convention	Salome Ofori-Owusu	393	0.7	—
Majority		47,085	85.2	—
Turnout		55,282	81.9	—

1992 Ghanaian parliamentary election: Ho Central Source:Electoral Commission of Ghana
Party	Candidate	Votes	%	±%
National Convention Party	Vincent Kofi Darkey-Mensah			—
Majority				—
Turnout		25,756	66.5	—

== See also ==
- List of Ghana Parliament constituencies
