= Nicholas Appiah-Kubi =

Ghanaian politician

Nicholas Appiah Kubi

Member of parliament for Jaman Constituency
- In office 7 January 1997 – 6 January 2001
- President: John Jerry Rawlings

Personal details
- Born: Jaman, Bono Region Ghana)
- Party: National Democratic Congress
- Occupation: Politician

Nicholas Appiah Kubi is a Ghanaian Politician and a member of the Second Parliament of the Fourth Republic representing theJaman Constituency in the Brong Ahafo Region of Ghana. He represented the Constituency for only one term.

== Early life ==
Appiah-Kubi was born in Jaman in the Bono Region of Ghana.

== Politics ==
Kubi was first elected into Parliament on the ticket of the National Democratic Congress during the 1996 Ghanaian general election. He polled 30,311 votes out of the 45,919 valid votes cast representing 34.70% over his opponents Rampson Stephen Ofori of the New Patriotic Party who polled 15,608 votes representing 17.90%.
