= Sampson Kwadwo Apraku =

Ghanaian politician

Member of parliament for Krachi Constituency
- In office 7 January 1997 – 6 January 2001
- President: John Jerry Rawlings

Personal details
- Born: Krachi, Volta Region, Ghana
- Party: National Democratic Congress
- Occupation: Politician

Sampson Kwadwo Apraku is a Ghanaian politician and a former member of the First and Second Parliament of the Fourth Republic, representing the Krachi Constituency in the Volta Region of Ghana.

== Early life ==
Apraku was born at Krachi in the Volta Region of Ghana.

== Politics ==
Apraku was first elected into parliament on the ticket of the Nationalist Congress Party(NCP) during the December 1992 Ghanaian elections for the Krachi Constituency in the Volta Region of Ghana. He was elected again in the 1996 Ghanaian general election on the ticket of the National Democratic Congress (NDC) party to serve his second term of office as the representative of the people of Krachi. He polled 31,055 votes out of the 48,386 valid votes cast representing 44.10% over Jilimah Patrick Charty of the Convention People's Party who polled 7,922 votes representing 11.20%, Francis Gyefour who polled 7,896 votes representing 11.20%, Isaac K. Bruce-Mensah Phoyon who polled 1,513 votes representing 2.10% and John Ajet-Nasam of the New Patriotic Party who polled 0 vote representing 0.00%.
