= Moctar Musah Bambah =

Ghanaian politician

Hon. Moctar Musah Bambah

Deputy Minister of Presidential Affairs
- In office 7 January 2001 – 6 January 2005
- President: John Kufuor

Member of Parliament for Wenchi East Constituency
- In office 7 January 1997 – 6 January 2005
- Preceded by: Hayford Osei Kwadwo
- Succeeded by: Constituency merged

Personal details
- Party: New Patriotic Party
- Profession: Politician

Alhaji Moctar Musah Bambah is a Ghanaian politician and was the member of parliament for the Wenchi East constituency in the Brong Ahafo region of Ghana. He was a member of parliament in the 3rd parliament of the 4th republic of Ghana. He was also a Deputy Minister of Presidential Affairs.

== Politics ==
Bambah is a member of the New Patriotic Party. He was elected as the member of parliament for the Wenchi East constituency in the Brong Ahafo region in the 3rd parliament of the 4th republic of Ghana. He was succeeded by Professor George Yaw Djan-Baffuor after the constituency was changed to Wenchi constituency in the 2004 Ghanaian General elections. He was initially elected into parliament on 7 January 1997 after being pronounced winner of the 1996 Ghanaian General Elections.

== Elections ==
Bambah was elected as the member of parliament for the Wenchi East constituency in the 2000 Ghanaian general elections. He was elected on the ticket of the New Patriotic Party. His constituency was a part of the 14 parliamentary seats out of 21 seats won by the New Patriotic Party in that election for the Brong Ahafo Region. The New Patriotic Party won a majority total of 100 parliamentary seats out of 200 seats in the third parliament of the fourth republic of Ghana. He polled 14,954 votes out of 27,536 total valid votes cast. This was equivalent to 55.9% of the total valid votes cast. He was elected over Frederick Osei-Dabankah of the National Democratic Congress, Kwaku Amoa-Tutu of the National Reform Party, Agyenim Boateng Agyei of the Convention People's Party and Takyi Kwame Anokye of the United Ghana Movement. These obtained 10,563, 533, 529 and 177 votes respectively out of the total valid votes cast. These were equivalent to 39.5%, 2.0%, 2.0% and 0.7% respectively of total valid votes cast.
