= Nicholas K. Adjei-Kyeremeh =

Ghanaian politician

Nicholas K. Adjei Kyeremeh

Member of parliament for Techiman South Constituency
- In office 7 January 1997 – 6 January 2001
- President: John Jerry Rawlings

Personal details
- Born: Dormaa East District, Bono Region Ghana)
- Party: National Democratic Congress
- Occupation: Politician

Nicholas K. Adjei Kyeremeh is a Ghanaian politician and a member of the Second Parliament of the Fourth Republic representing the Dormaa East Constituency in the Brong Ahafo Region of Ghana. He served one term as a Parliamentarian.

== Early life ==
Adjei was born in Dormaa East District in the Bono Region of Ghana.

== Politics ==
Adjei was first elected into Parliament on the ticket of the National Democratic Congress During the 1996 Ghanaian general elections for the Dorma East Constituency in the Brong Ahafo Region of Ghana. He polled 9,103 votes out of the 16,919 valid votes cast representing 36.10% over his opponents Stephen Adoma-Yeboah of the New New Patriotic Party who polled 7,463 votes representing 29.60% and Gyabah Samuel of the People's National Convention who polled 353 votes representing 1.40%.
