= Clement Tumfuga Bugase =

Ghanaian politician

- Incumbent
- Assumed office 7 January 1997

Member of Parliament for Navrongo Central Constituency
- President: Jerry John Rawlings

Clement Tumfuga Bugase is a Ghanaian politician and member of the second parliament of the fourth republic of Ghana representing Navrongo Central under the membership of the National Democratic Congress (NDC).

== Political career ==
He was elected on 7 January 1997 after emerging winner at the 1996 Ghanaian General Elections. He defeated John Setuni Achuliwor who was independent by obtaining 41.10% of the total valid votes which is equivalent to 16,811 votes while his opposition obtained 38.10% which is equivalent to 15,599 votes. After representing his constituency for four years, Bugase decided to run for a second term and was defeated by John Setuni Achuliwor who joined the New Patriotic Party prior to the election and won by obtaining 41.50% of the total valid votes which is equivalent to 11,246 votes while Bugase obtained 40.90% which is equivalent to 11,103 votes. He was defeated alongside Pwoawuvi J. Weguri of the People's National Convention, Kaguah A. Castor of the National Reform Party, Frank Awepuga of the Great Consolidated Popular Party, Jennifer Anemana of the Convention People's Party and Margaret A. Punguse of the United Ghana Movement.
