= Kwamena Dwamena-Aboagye =

Ghanaian politician and diplomat

Kwame Dwamena-Aboagye

Member of parliament for Asuogaman Constituency
- In office 7 January 1997 – 6 January 2001
- President: John Jerry Rawlings

Personal details
- Born: Kwame; 1959 (age 66–67) Asuogyaman, Eastern Region, Ghana
- Party: National Democratic Congress
- Occupation: UN Diplomat, Fmr. Politician

Kwame Dwamena-Aboagye is a Ghanaian politician and a Member of the Second Parliament of the Fourth Republic representing the Asuogyaman Constituency in the Eastern Region of Ghana.

== Early life ==
Dwamena-Aboagye was born at Asuogyaman in the Eastern Region of Ghana.

== Politics ==
Dwamena-Aboagye first served as the District Chief Executive (DCE) of Asuogyaman Constituency in the Eastern Region of Ghana from 1988 - 1997. He was later first elected into Parliament on the ticket of the National Democratic Congress for the Asuogyaman Constituency during the December 1996 Ghanaian General Elections. He polled 20,320 votes out of the 24,673 valid votes cast representing 51.40% over his opponents Ntow-Bediako Emmanuel of the New Patriotic Party who polled 4,032 representing 10.20% and John Arjarquah of the Convention People's Party who polled 321 votes representing 0.80%.

He then moved on to handle several consultancies and held several high-level positions in the United Nations (UN) and related missions for over 17 years. His experience encompasses various capacities as a consultant, lecturer, trainer and mediator with public and civil society organisations - focusing on community engagement and development, also in conflict and post-conflict settings.

== Education ==
Dwamena-Aboagye holds a master's degree in Conflictology from the University of Catalunya, Spain and a postgraduate diploma in Armed Conflicts and Crisis Management from the same university. Additionally, he holds a master's degree in Public Administration from GIMPA, and a bachelor's degree from the University of Sunderland, UK.
