= Nana Koduah Kwarteng =

Ghanaian politician

Hon. Nana Koduah Kwarteng

Member of parliament for Tano South constituency
- In office 14 February 1995 – 6 January 1997

Personal details
- Party: National Democratic Congress
- Occupation: Politician

Nana Koduah Kwarteng is a Ghanaian politician, he served for the Tano South constituency as member of the first parliament of the fourth republic of Ghana in the Brong Ahafo Region of Ghana.

== Politics ==
Nana Koduah Kwarteng was elected during the Tano South parliamentary byelection in February 1995 following the death of Samuel Amonoo Koto Asamoah on the ticket of the National Democratic Congress as member of the first parliament of the fourth republic of Ghana. Samuel Amonoo Koto Asamoah was a member of parliament form the 1992 parliament elections from 7 January 1993 until his demise on 2 January 1995. In 1996 Ghanaian general election Nana Koduah Kwarteng, he lost the seat to Grace Boachie of the National Democratic Congress. She polled 13,390 votes out of the 24,879 valid votes cast representing 39.50% over her opponents Rex Ofori-Agyeman of the New Patriotic Party (NPP) who polled 9,568 votes representing 28.20%, Godfred Kwaku Oppong of the Convention People's Party (CPP) who polled 1,267 votes representing 3.705, Osman Asante-Bonsu of the People's National Convention (PNC) who polled 330 votes representing 1.00% and Daniel Kofi Nti of the National Convention Party(NCP) who polled 324 votes representing 1.00%.

== Career ==
Nana Koduah Kwarteng is a former member of parliament representing Tano South constituency from 7 February 1995 to 7 January 1997 after a byelection following the demise of Samuel Amonoo Koto Asamoah. Samuel Amonoo Koto Asamoah was the first Member of Parliament for Tano South Constituency of the Fourth Republic from 7 January 1993 to 2 January 1995.

== Personal life ==
He is a Christian.
