= Hayford Osei Kwadwo =

Ghanaian politician

Member of parliament for Wenchi Constituency
- In office 7 January 1993 – 6 January 1997
- President: Jerry John Rawlings
- Parliamentary group: National Democratic Congress

Personal details
- Born: 1954 (age 71–72)
- Occupation: Teacher

Hayford Osei Kwadwo (born 1954) is a Ghanaian politician and was a member of the First Parliament of the Fourth Republic of Ghana from 1995 to 1997 representing Wenchi Constituency under the membership of the National Democratic Congress.

== Early life and education ==
Hayford was born in 1954. He attended Kwame Nkrumah University of Science and Technology where he studied Social Science and bagged his Bachelor of Arts degree . He worked as an accountant before going into parliament.

== Politics ==
Hayford began his political career in 1992 when he became the parliamentary candidate for the National Democratic Congress (NDC) to represent his constituency in the Brong Ahafo region of Ghana after a by-election was conducted in 1995.

He was sworn into the First Parliament of the Fourth Republic of Ghana on 1 January 1995 after being pronounced winner at the By-elections. He thereafter lost the election to his counterpart Alhaji Moctar Musah Bambah of the New Patriotic Party who polled 37.30% of the total valid votes cast which was equivalent to 13,694 votes while Hayford polled 33.50% of the total valid votes cast as well which was equivalent to 12,283 votes.
