= Grace Boachie =

Ghanaian politician

Member of parliament for Tano South Constituency
- In office 7 January 1997 – 6 January 2001
- President: John Jerry Rawlings

Personal details
- Born: Tano South, Brong Ahafo Region Ghana)
- Party: National Democratic Congress
- Occupation: Politician

Grace Boachie is a Ghanaian politician and a member of the second Parliament of the Fourth Republic representing the Tano South Constituency in the Brong Ahafo region of Ghana.

== Early life ==
Grace Boachie was born in Tano South in the Brong Ahafo region of Ghana.

== Politics ==
Boachie was first elected into the Parliament on the ticket of the National democratic congress for the Tano South Constituency in the Brong Ahafo Region of Ghana. She polled 13,390 votes out of the 24,879 valid votes cast representing 39.50% over her opponents Rex Ofori-Agyeman who polled 9,568 votes representing 28.20%, Godfred Kwaku Oppong who polled 1,267 votes representing 3.70%, Osman Asante-Bonsu who polled 330 votes representing 1.00% and Daniel Kofi Nti who polled 324 votes representing 1.00%.

== Career ==
Grace Boachie is a former member of Parliament for the Tano South Constituency in the Brong Ahafo Region of Ghana.
