= Abraham Kofi Asante =

Ghanaian politician

Hon. Abraham Kofi Asante
- Preceded by: Joseph King Amankpah
- Succeeded by: John Gyetuah

Member of Parliament for Amenfi West Constituency
- In office 7 January 2001 – 6 January 2005
- President: John Kufuor

Personal details
- Party: National Democratic Congress
- Education: Kwame Nkrumah University of Science and Technology, University of Ghana, Ghana Telecommunication University College
- Occupation: Administrator

Abraham Kofi Asante is a Ghanaian politician and a member of the 2nd and 3rd parliament of the 4th republic of Ghana. He is a former member of Parliament for the Amenfi West constituency in the Western Region a member of the National Democratic Congress political Party in Ghana. He resigned from the NDC to join the NPP. He contested the parliamentary seat for Amenfi West Constituency on the ticket of the NPP in the 2020 elections but lost to the NDC candidate

== Early life and education ==
Asante is a product of the Kwame Nkrumah University of Science and Technology. He acquired a Bachelor of Science degree in chemistry from the said university. He is also a product of the University of Ghana where he acquired a Master of Business Administration Degree. He later acquired a Master of Science Degree from the Ghana Telecom University College.

== Politics ==
Asante was a member of the 3rd parliament of the 4th republic of Ghana. He is a member of the National Democratic Congress and a representative of the Amenfi West constituency of the Western Region of Ghana. His political career began when he contested in the 1996 Ghanaian General elections and won on the ticket of the National Democratic Congress. He polled 16,085 votes out of the 24,396 valid votes cast representing 46.70% over his opponent Sanuel Alberto Tekyi who polled 8,311 votes.

=== 2000 Elections ===
Asante was elected as the member of parliament for the Amenfi West constituency in the 2000 Ghanaian general elections. He won the elections on the ticket of the National Democratic Congress. His constituency was a part of the 9 parliamentary seats out of 19 seats won by the National Democratic Congress in that election for the Western Region. The National Democratic Congress won a minority total of 92 parliamentary seats out of 200 seats in the 3rd parliament of the 4th republic of Ghana. He was elected with 10,848 votes out of 21,704 total valid votes cast. This was equivalent to 49.4% of the total valid votes cast. He was elected over Samuel Alberto Tekyi of the New Patriotic Party and Kwasi Dankama Quarm of the Convention People's Party. These obtained 9,493 and 937 votes respectively out of the total valid votes cast. These were equivalent to 44.6% and 4.4% respectively of total valid votes cast.

== See also ==
- List of MPs elected in the 2000 Ghanaian parliamentary election
