= Mohammed Erzuah Siam =

Ghanaian politician

Member of parliament for Akwatia Constituency
- In office 7 January 1997 – 6 January 2001
- President: John Jerry Rawlings

Personal details
- Born: Akwatia, Eastern Region, Ghana
- Party: National Democratic Congress
- Occupation: Politician

Mohammed Erzuah Siam is a Ghanaian politician and a member of the Second Parliament of the Fourth Republic representing the Akwatia Constituency in the Eastern Region of Ghana.

== Early life ==
Siam was born in the Eastern Region of Ghana, Akwatia.

== Career ==
Siam was a Senior Community Relations Officer of Volta River Authority. He is a former member of Parliament for the Akwatia Constituency in the Eastern Region of Ghana.

== Politics ==
Siam was first elected into Parliament on the ticket of the National Democratic Congress during the December 1996 Ghanaian General Election for the Akwatia Constituency in the Eastern Region of Ghana. He polled 22,140 votes out of the 38,701 valid votes cast 52.90% over his opponents Francis A. Y. Agyare-Bray who polled 30.60%, Ernest Kwame Ampofo who polled 2,240 votes and Joseph Kofi Asiedu who polled 1,506 votes.
