= Reo Addai Basoah =

Ghanaian politician (1936–2002)

Hon. Reo Addai Basoah
- In office 7 January 2001 – 30 July 2002

Member of Parliament for Kumawu Constituency
- President: John Kufuor

Personal details
- Born: 1936
- Died: 30 July 2002 (aged 65–66) Greater Accra Region, Ghana
- Party: New Patriotic Party
- Education: Cambridge Technical College, Yale University, King's College
- Profession: Lawyer, Economist

Reo Addai Basoah (1936 – 30 July 2002) was a Ghanaian politician who was a Member of Parliament for the Kumawu constituency of the Ashanti Region. He was a member of the second and third parliament of the 4th republic of Ghana. He was also the chairman of the Finance Committee of the Parliament of Ghana in 1997 until he became the member of parliament after winning in the 1996 general elections.

Basoah died at the Korle-Bu Teaching Hospital on 30 July 2002 after a short illness.

== Early life and education ==
Basoah was born in 1936. He studied at Cambridge Technical College in London. He also studied at Yale University before proceeding to King's College in Cambridge to pursue a course in Economics. In 1962 he became Barrister-at-Law in Lincoln's Inn. Basoah also worked as an economist at the Commonwealth Economic Committee in London and at the World Bank in Washington, D.C. from 1965 to 1972.

== Politics ==
His political career began in 1992 when he first entered Parliament as a commissioner for the state enterprise commission. He was later appointed as the chairman of the finance committee in 1997. He contested in the 1996 general elections as a representative of the Kumawu constituency on the ticket of the New Patriotic Party and won with a total of 15,025 of the total votes cast that year. He then contested again in the 2000 general elections and retained his seat for the second time with a total of 13,554 votes making 57.80% of the total votes cast. He died before the end of his parliamentary term.

== Death ==
Basoah died at the Korle-Bu Teaching Hospital in the Greater Accra Region, on 30 July 2002. He had been admitted three days earlier following a short illness.
