= Samuel Oppong (politician) =

Ghanaian politician

Member of Parliament for Effiduase Asokore Constituency
- In office 7 January 1997 – 6 January 2001
- President: John Jerry Rawlings

Personal details
- Born: Agona West, Central Region Ghana
- Party: National Democratic Congress
- Occupation: Politician

Samuel Oppong is a Ghanaian politician and a member of the Second Parliament of the Fourth Republic representing the Agona West Constituency in the Central Region of Ghana.

== Early life ==
Opoong was born in Agona Nyakrom in the Central Region of Ghana.

== Politics ==
Oppong was first elected into Parliament on the Ticket of the National Democratic Congress for the Agona East Constituency in the Central Region of Ghana.

Oppong of the National Democratic Congress polled 19,473 votes representing 39.30% out of the 40,309 valid votes cast to win the seat, while Mr. Kofi Tawiah of the New Patriotic Party secured 14,831 votes representing 29.90%, John F. Edwin, Jnr who polled 3,362 votes, Isaac Ebo Bartels who polled 2,091 votes, Baba Rockson who polled 552 votes and Mattew Caurie who polled 0 votes. He was defeated by Samuel K. Obodai of the New Patriotic Party who polled 21,443 votes representing 57.50%.

== Career ==
He is a Former member of Parliament for the Agona West Constituency. He is also a Former MCE of Agona West from 2012 to early 2017. He was also Government Appointee, Tema Municipal Assembly, Tema, 1992-1996. He was also District Chairman for Democratic Youth League of Ghana, (DYLG) -Tema, 1985-1991.He is currently a member of the RMSC Foundation accra.He is till date the Dean of the Caucus of former MMDCES(Central region).He was the former National Co-ordinator of the Computerized School Selection and Placement System
