= List of colleges of education in Ghana =

In 2017, there were 40+ colleges of education in Ghana, up from 38 in 2015. The colleges are responsible for teacher education. A further two private colleges are to be absorbed into the group of 41 public institutions, raising the number to 43. Currently there are 49 Public Colleges of Education in Ghana as at August 2026..

This is a list of the 40+ Colleges of Education in Ghana:

- Abetifi Presbyterian College of Education, Kwahu Abetifi
- Accra College of Education, Greater Accra
- Ada College of Education, Ada
- Agogo Presbyterian College of Education, Agogo
- Akatsi College of Education, Akatsi
- Akrokerri College of Education, Akrokerri
- Al-Faruq College of Education, Wenchi/Droboso
- Atebubu College of Education, Atebubu
- Bagabaga College of Education, Tamale
- Bia Lamplighter College of Education, Sefwi Debiso
- Berekum College of Education, Berekum
- Christ the Teacher College of Education, Kumasi
- Dambai College of Education, Dambai
- Enchi College of Education, Enchi
- Evangelical Presbyterian College of Education, Amedzofe
- Evangelical Presbyterian College of Education, Bimbilla
- Foso College of Education, Assin Foso
- Gambaga College of Education, Gambaga
- Gbewaa College of Education, Pusiga constituency, Bawku Municipal District
- Holy Child College of Education, Sekondi-Takoradi
- Jasikan College of Education, Jasikan
- Kibi Presbyterian College of Education, Kibi
- Komenda College of Education, Kommenda, Ghana
- Mampong Technical College of Education, Mampong
- Methodist College of Education (Ghana), Akim Oda
- Mount Mary College of Education, Somanya
- Nusrat Jahan Ahmadiyya College of Education, Wa
- Our Lady of Apostles (OLA) College of Education, Cape Coast
- Offinso College of Education, Offinso
- Peki College of Education, Peki
- Presbyterian Women's College of Education, Aburi
- Presbyterian College of Education, Akropong–Akuapem
- Seventh Day Adventist (SDA) College of Education, Asokore
- St. Ambrose College of Education, Dormaa Akwamu, Dormaa Municipal District
- St. Francis College of Education, Hohoe
- St. John Bosco’s College of Education, Navrongo
- St. Joseph’s College of Education, Bechem
- St. Louis College of Education, Kumasi
- St. Monica's College of Education, Mampong
- St. Teresa's College of Education, Hohoe
- Tamale College of Education, Tamale
- Tumu College of Education, Tumu
- Wesley College of Education, Kumasi
- Wiawso College of Education, Sefwi-Wiawso District (Municipal)
- St. Vincent College of Education, Yendi
- McCoy College of Education
- Agona SDA College of Education
- Ghana Muslim Mission College Of Education, Wenchi (newly absorbed college, 2026)
- Seventh Day Adventist (SDA) College of Education, Agona (newly absorbed college, 2026)

== See also ==
- List of universities in Ghana
- List of polytechnics in Ghana
- List of Nursing Training Colleges in Ghana
- Category:Colleges of Education in Ghana
