= Justina Owusu–Banahene =

Ghanaian politician

Justina Awo Owusu–Banahene, also called Awo Baatanpa, (born 2 April 1970) is a Ghanaian politician, educationist, and the former regional minister for the Bono Region.

== Early life and education ==
Justina Owusu-Banahene was born on April 2, 1970, in Atronie near Sunyani within the Sunyani Municipality, she is currently pursuing a Ph.D. in Religious Studies. She holds a Master of Philosophy in Religious Studies with a focus on the Ethics of Religion, as well as a Bachelor of Education (Arts), all of which she earned from the University of Cape Coast.

In 1995, she completed her studies at Atebubu Teacher Training College, with a Teacher's Certificate A (3-Year Post-Sec.). Additionally, Justina Owusu-Banahene accomplished her G.C.E. ‘A’ Level education at Acherensua Secondary School in 1992, following her completion of G.C.E. ‘O’ Level studies at Techiman Secondary School in 1989.

== Career ==
Prior to her appointment as the Bono Regional Minister she was the Municipal Chief Executive (MCE) for the Sunyani Municipal Assembly in May 2019, Hon. Justina Owusu-Banahene served as a lecturer at Berekum College of Education. Additionally, she held part-time lecturing roles at Jackson College of Education in Sunyani from 2010 to 2019 and at St. Ambrose College of Education from 2010 to 2016.

From 1995 to 2000, Owusu-Banahene dedicated her efforts to the Ghana Education Service, where she worked as a teacher at Addokpe Junior Secondary School. She also fulfilled her National Service obligations at Garrison Junior High School.

== Politics ==
Owusu-Banahene is a member of the New Patriotic Party (NPP). She was the National Deputy Women Organizer for the party from 2018 until her appointment as the MCE.

She previously served as the Regional Women's Organizer for the party in the then Brong Ahafo Region from 2008 to 2012. In 2018, she contested as a candidate for the position of 2nd Vice Chairperson in the Regional Executives Elections of which lost to Joseph Mensah. She was later appointed as the Deputy National Women Organizer for the NPP in that same year.

Owusu-Banahene served as a member of the Bono Regional Campaign Team for both the 2016 and 2020 general elections. Between 2001 and 2004, she actively participated as a member and Organizer of TESCON at the University of Cape Coast (UCC).

She held the position as the Vice President of the Danquah-Busia Club at Atebubu Training College in 1995 and later at Acheresua Secondary School in 1992.

== Personal life ==
Owusu–Banahene is single with one son.
