= Wli Falls Festival =

Festival in Ghana by the people of Wli

Wli Falls Festival is an annual festival celebrated by the chiefs and people of Wli Traditional Area in the Volta Region of Ghana. It comprises Todzi, Agoviefe and Afegame communities. It is usually celebrated in the month of September. Wli Falls is about 20 km from Hohoe.

== Celebrations ==
During the festival, there is pomp and pageantry. There is also thanksgiving by the chiefs and peoples of the communities.

== Significance ==
This festival is celebrated to thank God for being kind for providing them with a waterfall that is perennial and provide as a source of water in an arid area.
