= St. Francis College of Education =

Teacher education college in Hohoe

- Motto: PRO DEO ET PATRIA
- Affiliations: Government of Ghana
- Location: Hohoe, Hohoe Municipal District, VC0026, Ghana; 7.15794°N 0.49038°E
- Language: English
- Region Zone: Volta Region; Volta Zone
- Short name: Franco
- Source: An Atlas of The Forty Colleges of Education in Ghana.

St. Francis College of Education is a teacher education college in Hohoe (Hohoe Municipal District, Volta Region, Ghana). The college is located in Volta Zone. It is one of the about 40 public colleges of education in Ghana. The college participated in the DFID-funded T-TEL programme.

== History ==
The history of St. Francis College of Education Hohoe dates back to the early days of German Missionary activities when it first opened at Gbi Bla then part of the former German Territory of Togo Land. Since that time, the College has had a chequered existence.

St. Francis Training College of Catholic foundation was established by German Catholic Missionaries, but was closed down three years later and removed to Agbedrafo in Togo (now Republic of Togo). It was re-opened in 1912 and closed down again as a result of the First World War (1914 – 1918).

At a meeting of Heads of the Missionaries at Accra in August, 1929, the College was opened again at Gbi Bla as a rural training centre. In 1930, work on the transformation of the centre into a training college was begun. In January 1931, the college was opened with 18 students by the late i and renamed St. Francis Training College with Rev. Fr. J. G. Holland as the principal. In 1934, the college was again closed down, and removed to Amisano. The college then became a 2-year Certificate ‘B’ teacher training college when it was opened on 14 February 1947 due to the untiring efforts of the Bishop J. G. Holland. The first members of staff were four: two expatriates one of whom Mr. G. J. Finnegan, was the principal, Mr. Hugh O’ Kelly, Vice Principal; and two Africans, Mr. P. K. Akoto-Ampaw and Mr. V. K. Ayivor. The pioneer students numbered thirty.

In 1954, thirty women were admitted into the college, making the college a co-educational institution. The two-year certificate ‘B’ course ended in 1962, and a four-year certificate ‘A’ course was introduced. A two-year History Specialist course was offered between 1964 and 1967. This course was removed to the Advanced Teacher Training College at Winneba. In 1968, the four-year course students were joined by some seventy men and a woman for a two-year certificate ‘A’ post-secondary course. In September 1973, a two-year Science and Mathematics Specialist course was introduced.

St. Francis’ College was among the 38 teacher training colleges given accreditation by National Accreditation Board (Ghana) to tertiary institution in September, 2007 to offer Diploma in Basic Education programme.

FRANCO was ranked first among the colleges when the maiden final results of the Diploma in Basic Education was released by the Institute of Education University of Cape Coast. FRANCO saw the celebration of its centenary in November 2008.

List of Principals
Name	Years served
Mr. M.H. Coleman	1950-1961
Mr. P.K. Akoto-Ampaw	1961-1974
Mr. P.Y. Kojokumah	1974-1983
Mr. J.A. Lenwah	1983-1998
Mr. I.W.K. Dorleku	1998-2002
Ms. C.M.B. Agbettoh (Ag.)	2002-2003
Mr. M.K. Agbenuvor	2003-

== Notable alumni ==
Many of the products of the college have held very prominent positions in the country, for example,

- Yaw Asare, dramatist and playwright
- Prof. Amuzu Kpeglo
- Hon. Modestus Ahiable
- Prof. C. K. Fordunoo
- Mr. C. K. Dewornu former I.G.P.
- Mr. Kumedzro
- Prof. Alex
- Prof. Paschal Younge of Ohio University
- Dr. Addeah Koranteng.
