= Nathaniel Kwadzo Aduadjoe =

Ghanaian politician

Hon. Nathaniel Kwadzo Aduadjoe
- Preceded by: Patience Pomary
- Succeeded by: Prince Jacob Hayibor

Member of Parliament for Hohoe North Constituency
- In office 7 January 2001 – 6 January 2005
- President: John Kufuor

Personal details
- Party: National Democratic Congress
- Profession: Politician

Nathaniel Kwadzo Aduadjoe is a Ghanaian politician and was the member of parliament for the Hohoe North constituency in the Volta region of Ghana. He was a member of parliament in the 2nd and 3rd parliament of the 4th republic of Ghana.

== Career ==
Aduadjoe is a Ghanaian politician.

== Politics ==
Aduadjoe is a member of the National Democratic Congress. He was elected as the member of parliament for the Hohoe North constituency in the Volta region in the 2nd and 3rd parliament of the 4th republic of Ghana. He was succeeded by Prince Jacob Hayibor after in the 2004 Ghanaian General elections.

During the 1996 Ghanaian General Elections, he polled 39,008 votes out of the 49,764 valid votes cast representing 62.80% over Stanley Tsaku Harker of the People's National Convention who polled 4,264 votes, Anthony Akoto-Ampaw of the Convention people's Party who polled 3,740 votes and Ray Kakrabah-Quarshie of the New Patriotic Party who polled 2,752 votes.

Aduadjoe was elected as the member of parliament for the Hohoe North constituency in the 2000 Ghanaian general elections. He was elected on the ticket of the National Democratic Congress. His constituency was a part of the 17 parliamentary seats out of 19 seats won by the National Democratic Congress in that election for the Volta Region.

The National Democratic Congress won a minority total of 92 parliamentary seats out of 200 seats in the 3rd parliament of the 4th republic of Ghana. He was elected with 26,934 votes out of 38,405 total valid votes cast. This was equivalent to 71.3% of the total valid votes cast.

He was elected over George Boateng of the New Patriotic Party, Sylvester Tobo Ahorkui of the People's National Convention, Linus Victory K. Fianyo of the Convention People's Party, Puplapu W. Tetteh of the National Reformed Party and Delase K. Harmony of the United Ghana Movement.

These obtained 5,525, 2,431, 1,209, 1,161 and 518 votes respectively out of the total valid votes cast.These were equivalent to 14.6%, 6.4%, 3.2%, 3.1% and 1.4% respectively of total valid votes cast.
