= Alfred Badu Nkansah =

Ghanaian politician and teacher

Member of the Ghana Parliament for Asunafo
- In office 1 October 1969 – 13 January 1972
- Preceded by: New
- Succeeded by: Himself
- Parliamentary group: Progress Party
- In office 1979 – 31 December 1981
- Preceded by: Himself
- Succeeded by: Constituency split
- Parliamentary group: Popular Front Party

Personal details
- Born: 11 January 1936 (age 90) Gold Coast
- Education: Berekum College of Education; Peki College of Education; University of Ghana
- Occupation: Teacher; politician

Alfred Badu Nkansah is a Ghanaian politician and teacher. He was the member of parliament for the Asunafo constituency during the second republic of Ghana.

== Early life and education ==
Nkansah was born on 11 January 1936. He attended the Berekum Training College and the Peki Training College where he obtained his Teachers' Training Certificate. He later entered the University of Ghana where he was awarded his Bachelor of Arts degree in history.

== Career and politics ==
Nkansah's political career begun when he was nominated member of the constituent assembly for two constituencies Asunafo and Asutifi in a tripartite competition. Nkansah was sworn into office as a member of parliament on 1 October 1969, following his election during the 1969 Ghanaian parliamentary general election. He served as a member of parliament for the Asunafo Constituency on the ticket of the Progress Party from 1969 to 1972 when the Busia government was overthrown. In 1979, he was a member of the Legislative Assembly but was later expelled by the Privilege Committee of the assembly for being absent for five consecutive days without permission. That same year, he was elected member of parliament for the Asunafo Constituency on the ticket of the Popular Front Party. He served in this capacity from 1979 until the 31 December 1981 when the Limann government was overthrown.

== Religion ==
Nkansah is a Christian.
