= John Peter Amewu =

Ghanaian politician (born 1968)

Hon. John-Peter Amewu
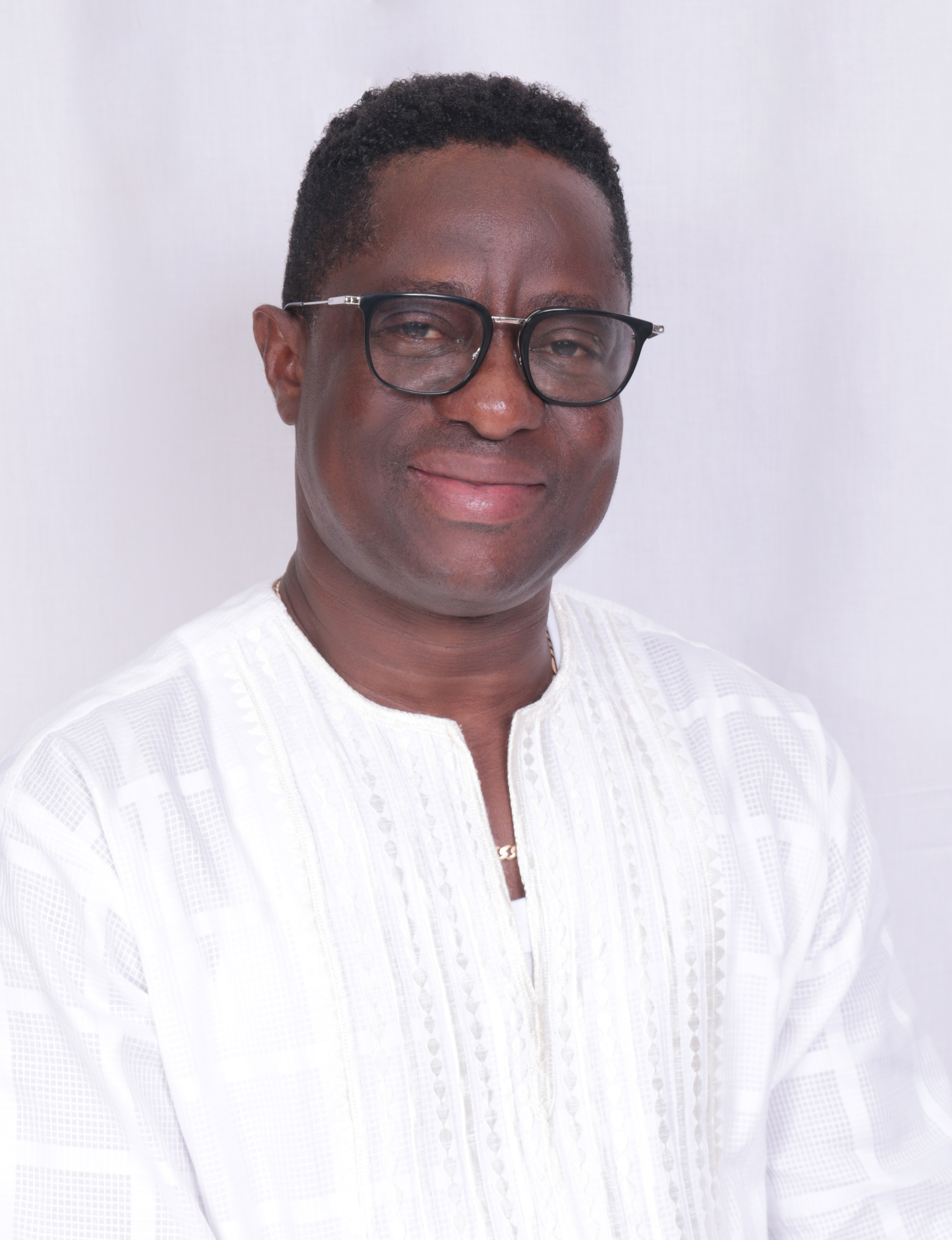

Member of the Ghana Parliament for Hohoe
- Incumbent
- Assumed office 7 January 2021
- Preceded by: Bernice Adiku Heloo
- Majority: 5,131

Minister for Energy
- In office August 2018 – 6 January 2021
- President: Nana Akufo-Addo
- Vice President: Mahamudu Bawumia
- Preceded by: Boakye Agyarko

Personal details
- Party: New Patriotic Party
- Occupation: Politician
- Website: amewu.com

John-Peter Amewu (born 16 March 1968) is a Ghanaian politician and current Minister for Railways Development and Member of Parliament (MP) for Hohoe Constituency in the Volta Region . He was Minister of Energy and Minister for Lands and Natural Resources.

== Early life and education ==
John-Peter Amewu was born in 1968 in Wli-Todzi in the Hohoe Municipality of the Volta Region. He attended Hohoe E. P. Senior High School, St. Mary's Seminary/Senior High School, Lolobi and Adisadel College, Cape Coast for his high school education. John-Peter Amewu obtained his bachelor's degree in Construction Technology from Kwame Nkrumah University of Science and Technology. He furthered his education and obtained an MBA in finance from University of Ghana, Legon, and proceeded to obtain a postgraduate degree in international energy industry management and a master's degree in petroleum law and policy from University of Dundee (UK).

== Career ==
He is a co-founder of Africa Centre for Energy Policy (ACEP), where he worked as the director of policy and research, and provided policy advice to support a variety of government and private sector projects.

== Politics ==
Amewu is a member of the New Patriotic Party (NPP). He was appointed by His Excellency John Agyekum Kufour as the municipal chief executive for Hohoe Municipal Assembly. He served as municipal chief executive for Hohoe from 2005 to 2009. He was the New Patriotic Party parliamentary candidate for the 2004, general elections and 2008 general elections to contest the then Hohoe North Constituency seat but lost to both to the National Democratic Congress parliamentary candidate Prince Jacob Hayibor.

=== Cabinet minister ===
In May 2017, Amewu was appointed to serve in the 19-Member Cabinet of Nana Akufo-Addo as the Minister for Lands and Natural Resources (Ghana).

In August 2018, following the sacking of Boakye Agyarko as Energy Minister, President Nana Addo-Danquah Akufo-Addo moved Amewu's to the Energy Ministry. He served as head of the Ministry until 2021 when he was reassigned to the Ministry of Railways Development.

=== Member of Parliament ===
After his victory in the 2020 Presidential and Parliamentary elections, Amewu became the first New Patriotic Party's candidate since 1992 to win a parliamentary election in the Hohoe Constituency. Amewu's victory was challenged in a petition laid before the High Court in Ho which claimed that some 17,000 voters in Santrofi, Akpofi, Likpe and Lolobi who should have voted in the Hohoe Constituency did not vote in the election and were thus left without representation. The Petitioners asked the court to nullify the results, but in a July 2024 ruling, the Ho High Court ruled that the case brought by the petitioners effectively questioned Constitutional Instrument 128, the legislation that governed the conduct of the 2020 Elections, a matter that the High Court did not have powers to decide. The Court therefore dismissed the petition and Amewu remained the MP for Hohoe

== Personal life ==
Amewu identifies as a Christian. He is married with four children.

Parliament of Ghana
Preceded by Bernice Adiku Heloo	Member of Parliament for Hohoe; 2021–present	Incumbent
Political offices
Preceded by Boakye Agyarko	Minister for Energy; 2018–present	Incumbent
