= St. Teresa's College of Education =

- Collège d'éducation Sainte-Thérèse
- Affiliations: Government of Ghana
- Location: Hohoe, Hohoe Municipal District, VC0002, Ghana; 7.15879°N 0.48193°E
- Language: French and English
- Region Zone: Volta Region; Volta Zone
- Short name: Teresco / Wotraco
- Source: An Atlas of The Forty Colleges of Education in Ghana.

St. Teresa's College of Education is a teacher education college in Hohoe (Hohoe Municipal District, Volta Region, Ghana). The college is located in Volta Zone zone. It is one of the about 40 public colleges of education in Ghana. The college participated in the DFID-funded T-TEL programme.

== History ==
St. Teresa's College of Education, a female institution, which was originally called Women's Training College (WOTRACO) was established on the 1st of November, 1961 with 35 pioneer students. The college was founded by His Lordship Rt. Rev. Anthony Konings who was the Bishop of Keta Diocese. The name of the College was changed to St. Teresa's Training College in 1964 when the institution was placed under the patronage of St. Teresa of the Child Jesus and adopted the motto “Live the Truth in Charity”. The college inherited the premises of a Sisters’ Convent which had two storey buildings and one bungalow. Between1963-1967 a number of structures for academic work and residence were built. A 6-unit classroom block and a Library were put in 2007 by the government.

In 1975, government converted the college into a Teachers’ Resource Centre against the wish of the Dioceses. The teacher training programme was re-introduced in 1977 with the admission of men in addition to female students. In the 1990/1991 academic year it was restored to its original status as a female institution. The College, at the time of its establishment offered the 2-year Teachers Certificate ‘B’ course. The first batch of Certificate ‘A’ 4-year trainees were admitted in the 1962/63 were admitted.

Principals of the college since 1961 are the following:
Name	Years served
Ms. Catherine Bagley	1961 – 1962
Ms. Eleanor Staunton	1962 – 1970
Mrs. Justine Adjah (Ag.)	1970 – 1973
Ms. Cecilia Y. Tibu	1973 – 1978
Mrs. Gladys B. Ahiabu	1978 – 1990
Mrs. Matilda Louisa Asamoah (Ag).	1990
Mrs. Benedicta A. N. Tiriku	1990 – 2001
Ms. Josephine Rita Yempew	2001 – 2008
