= Guan District =

District of Oti Region in Ghana

- District
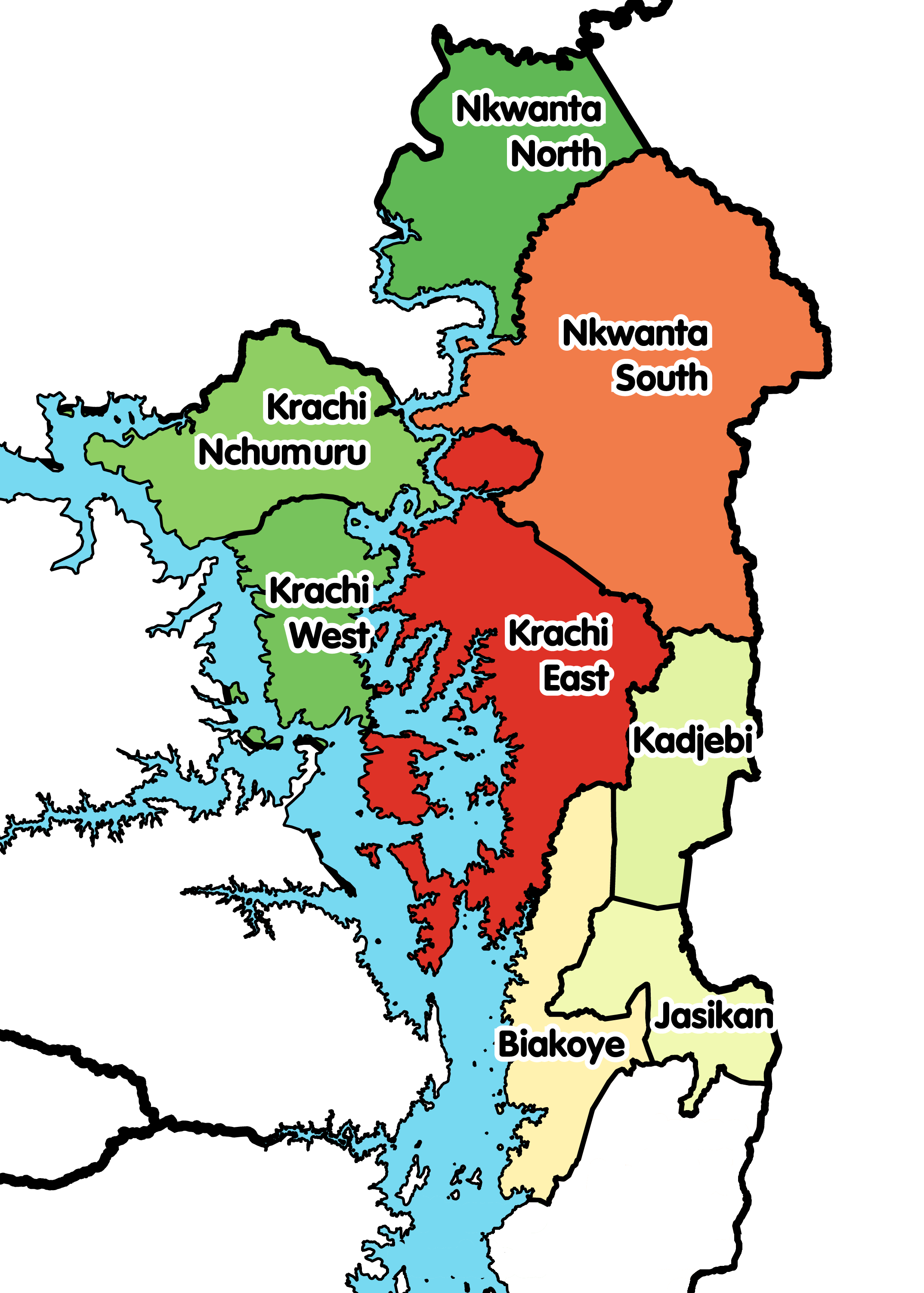
- Districts of Oti Region

- Location of Guan District within Oti
- Region: Oti
- Capital: Likpe-Mate

Area
  - Total: 343.0 km^{2} (132.4 sq mi)

Population (2021)
  - Total: 28,238
- Time zone: UTC+0 (GMT)
- ISO 3166 code: GH-OT-GU

Guan District is one of the nine districts in Oti Region, Ghana. Originally created as an ordinary district assembly in 1988 when it was known as Hohoe District (within Volta Region), until it was elevated to municipal district assembly status on 29 February 2008 to become Hohoe Municipal District (still within Volta Region). However on 8 October 2021, the northern part of the district was split off to create Guan District (while being moved to Oti Region); thus the remaining part has been retained as Hohoe Municipal District (still within Volta Region). The district is located in the southeastern part of Oti Region and has Likpe-Mate as its capital town.
