= Gabriel Osei =

Ghanaian politician

Hon. Gabriel Osei

Member of the Ghana Parliament for Tain Constituency
- In office 7 January 2017 – 6 January 2021
- Succeeded by: Adama Sulemana

Personal details
- Born: June 2, 1974 (age 52) Badu, Ghana
- Party: New Patriotic Party
- Education: Catholic University College, KNUST
- Occupation: Finance Officer

Gabriel Kweku Osei is a Ghanaian politician and member of the Seventh Parliament of the Fourth Republic of Ghana representing the Tain Constituency in the Brong-Ahafo Region on the ticket of the New Patriotic Party. Currently, he is the Business Development Officer for the National Service Scheme Head Office.

== Early life and education ==
Osei was born on 2 June 1974 and hails from Badu in the then Brong Ahafo Region, now Bono Region. He had his Bachelor of Science degree in economics at the Catholic University College in Fiapre in 2008. He also had his certificate in Executive Master of Business Administration (CEMBA) from KNUST.

== Career ==
Osei was the finance officer at St. Ambrose College of Education in Dormaa Akwamu.

== Politics ==
Osei is a member of the New Patriotic Party. He is the former MP for Tain Constituency in the Bono Region of Ghana. In the 2020 Ghanaian general elections, he lost his seat to Adama Sulemana. He had 18,346 votes making 40.87% of the total votes cast.

== Philanthropy ==
In October 2020, he presented about 150 bags of cement to help in the construction of the Brodi Senior High School and a Police Post in the constituency.

== Personal life ==
Osei is a Christian.
