= Yaw Asare =

Ghanaian academic, playwright and director (1954–2002)

- Born: 1954; Nkonya-Tayi, Oti Region, Gold Coast
- Died: 1 August 2002 (aged 48); Accra, Ghana
- Education: University of Ghana
- Occupations: Academic, playwright, dramatist and director

Yaw Asare (1954 – 1 August 2002) was a Ghanaian academic, playwright, dramatist and director.

== Early life and education ==
Asare was born in 1954 at Nkonya-Tayi, a town in the Oti Region. He had his primary school and middle school education at Nkonya Ahenkro, and his secondary education at Nkonya Secondary School where he obtained his Ordinary-Level certificate in 1971. Asare continued at St. Francis Teachers' Training College, Hohoe, where he was awarded the post secondary Teachers' Certificate A, and the University of Ghana, where he obtained a Diploma in Theatre Arts from the School of Performing Arts with Dance as a major subject. In 1982, Asare returned to the University of Ghana to pursue a bachelor's degree programme in English and Theatre Arts. He followed it up in 1990 by undertaking a Master of Philosophy in African Studies, specialising in African Oral Performance Arts. He graduated in 1993.

== Career ==
Following his teacher training at Hohoe, he taught for three years at Pedeku-Ada. After completing his diploma programme from the University of Ghana, Asare resumed teaching for another three years at Agogo Teachers' Training College, and Nkonya Secondary School. From 1988 to 1989, Asare taught at the University of Ghana School of Performing Arts and the National Commission on Culture. Later in 1994, Asare moved to the National Theater to work as the artistic director of the Abibigromma, a resident drama company.

In 1999, he returned to the University of Ghana, where he wrote for newspapers, radio, television, the stage and video. He founded Dawuro Africa, a campus-based experimental theatre company. Asare was planning to further his studies by pursuing a doctorate degree that was going to make use of his research into folklore and popular performance, and connect it with the productions he was putting on. He was due to leave for the United States of America on 18 August 2002 to begin his doctoral research at the University of California, Santa Barbara on a Fulbright scholarship.

== Death ==
Asare died in Accra aged 48 on 1 August 2002, after battling an illness.

== Works ==
- King Kokroko (1994)
- Bride of the Gods (1996)
- The Choice (1996)
- Ananse and the Price of Greed (TV 1996)
- Ananse in the Land of Idiots (unpublished)
