= Joseph Trumah Bayel =

Ghanaian politician (1954–2025)

Hon. Joseph Trumah Bayel

Member of Parliament for Sawla/Kalba Constituency
- In office 7 January 1993 – 6 January 1997
- President: Jerry John Rawlings
- In office 7 January 1997 – 6 January 2000
- President: Jerry John Rawlings

Member of Parliament for Sawla/Kalba Constituency
- In office 7 January 2000 – 6 January 2004
- President: John Agyekum Kufuor

Personal details
- Born: 20 June 1954
- Died: August 2025 (aged 71) Sawla, Ghana
- Party: National Democratic Congress
- Profession: Politician

Joseph Trumah Bayel (20 June 1954 – August 2025) was a Ghanaian politician who was a member of the 3rd parliament of the 4th Republic of Ghana and a member of parliament for Sawla/Kalba district of the Northern Region of Ghana.

== Early life and education ==
Bayel was born on 20 June 1954. He attended St John Bosco's Training College.

Bayel was a teacher by profession.

== Politics ==
Bayel was a member of the 1st, 2nd and 3rd parliament of the 4th republic of Ghana. His first appearance in parliament was in 1992 when he contested as a parliamentary candidate for the Sawla/Kalba constituency on the ticket of the National Democratic Congress. Even though, information about his 1992 victory is not scarce to get, he was again reelected into parliament in the 1996 election which he won with a total of 17,876 valid votes cast making 59.40%. He contested again in the 2000 Ghanaian general election and maintained the seat for the National Democratic Congress for the third term. He won with 10,286 votes making 57.50% of the total valid vote cast. His political ties with the National Democratic Congress ended but he resurfaced in 2012 on the ticket.

== Personal life ==
Bayel was a Christian. He graduated from St. John Bosco's College of Education. He died after a short illness in August 2025, at the age of 71.
