= Yikpa Falls =

Waterfall in Togo

- Yikpa Falls

- Location within Togo
- Location: Yikpa, Danyi Prefecture, Plateaux Region, Togo
- Coordinates: 7°06′21″N 0°36′31″E
- Type: Double
- Elevation: 800 m (2,600 ft)
- Total height: 70–100 m (230–330 ft)
- Watercourse: Agumatsa River

Yikpa Falls (French: Cascades de Yikpa) are a group of waterfalls in the canton of Yikpa, Danyi Prefecture, Plateaux Region, Togo, near the border with Ghana. Fed by the Agumatsa River, they are among the highest waterfalls in the country and an important natural and tourist site in south-western Togo.

== Location and description ==
The falls lie on the mountainous Danyi plateau, about 30 km (19 mi) north of Kpalimé. The site is reached on foot along forest trails through coffee and cocoa plantations. The area is characterised by steep terrain, dense vegetation and a humid climate favourable to tropical forest.

The site consists of a double waterfall with an estimated height of between 70 and more than 100 metres, according to local measurements. One fall is on the Togolese side, while the other continues into Ghana, where it is known as the Wli waterfalls. The falls form a natural pool suitable for swimming. The surrounding area hosts a varied fauna of birds, insects and primates.

== History and cultural significance ==
Local people regard Yikpa Falls as a sacred place, associated with traditional beliefs related to purification, prosperity and spiritual protection. Rituals and ceremonies were held there in the past. The canton of Yikpa has historically been inhabited by Ewe communities descended from the exodus from Notsé, a major episode in Ewe history. The present villages were settled gradually during the pre-colonial and colonial periods.

== Tourism and conservation ==
Today the falls are one of the main ecotourism sites of the Plateaux Region. Visits are usually led by local guides and overseen by a village management committee. Activities include hiking, swimming, discovering the local flora and viewing the mountain landscape. Tourism development aims to balance environmental protection with local economic benefit.

Because the site is fragile, community measures have been introduced to limit environmental impact, including access regulation, trail maintenance and raising visitors' awareness of the need to respect the natural environment.
