= Bernice Heloo =

Ghanaian politician (1954–2024)

Hon. Dr. Bernice Adiku Heloo

Member of the Ghana Parliament for Hohoe 2013.to 2016
- In office 7 January 2013 – 6 January 2017
- Succeeded by: John Peter Amewu

Former Deputy Minister for Environment, Science and Technology and Innovation
- In office 2013–2017
- President: John Dramani Mahama

Personal details
- Born: Bernice Adiku Heloo; 24 September 1954 Hohoe, British Togoland (now Ghana)
- Died: 25 December 2024 (aged 70)
- Party: National Democratic Congress
- Profession: Development expert
- Cabinet: Minister
- Committees: Appointments Committee

Bernice Adiku Heloo (24 September 1954 – 25 December 2024) was a Ghanaian politician who served as a Member of Parliament for the Hohoe Constituency.

== Early life and education ==
Heloo was born in Hohoe, Volta Region, Gold Coast on 24 September 1954, to Rev. E. T. Adiku and Comfort Adiku.

Heloo attended Mawuli School and OLA Girls' Secondary School, Ho. She obtained a BA in study of religions and an MPhil in adult education from the University of Ghana. She also obtained an M.Ed. in adult education, literacy for rural development from the University of Manchester. She obtained her doctorate degree in political economy from the Swiss Management Center University.

== Career ==
Heloo was the immediate past president of Society For Women and AIDS in Africa and founder of Prolink, an NGO in Ghana. She was later the member of Parliament for Hohoe constituency.

== Politics ==
=== Member of Parliament ===
Heloo was a minority member in the 6th and 7th parliaments of the 4th republic of Ghana. She was the member of parliament for Hohoe, Volta Region from January 7, 2013, to January 2021; this is her second term. As the parliamentary member for Hohoe Constituency, Heloo criticized the president of the Republic of Ghana Nana Addo Dankwa Akufo-Addo for not addressing the kidnapping of the Takoradi girls in the 2019 state of the nation address.

=== 2012 election ===
Hon. Heloo contested the Hohoe constituency parliamentary seat in the Volta Region on the ticket of National Democratic Congress during the 2012 Ghanaian general election and won the parliamentary seat with 40, 486 votes representing 81.58% of the total votes. He was elected over Obro- Adibo Janet Einefa of New Patriotic Party, Agbenorwosi Rich- Doh of Progressive People's Party (PPP), Cecil- Rhodes Dodge of PNC and Kutuadu Beauty of Convention People's Party. They obtained 6, 358 votes, 2, 462 votes, 193 votes and 129 votes respectively. These are equivalent to 12.81%, 4.96%, 0.39% and 0.26% of the total votes respectively.

==== 2016 election ====
Hon. Heloo was re- elected as a member of parliament for Hohoe (Ghana parliament constituency) in the Volta Region on the ticket of the National Democratic Congress during the 2016 Ghanaian general election with 35, 437 votes representing 82.09% of the total votes. He won the parliamentary seat over Marlon Praises Anipa of New Patriotic Party who pulled 6, 462 votes which is equivalent to 15.01%, parliamentary candidate for NDP Justine Kumordzi had 383 votes representing 0.9%, Ameckson Frank Sellasie of Progressive People's Party (PPP) had 269 votes which is equivalent to 0.6% and the parliamentary candidate for Convention People's Party Wisdom Kweku Adetor pulled 179 votes representing 0.4% of the total votes.

=== Deputy Minister ===
Heloo was appointed by President John Dramani Mahama in 2013 to serve as deputy Minister of Environment, Science and Technology and Innovation. She served in that role in the John Mahama administration from 2013 to 2017.

== Personal life and death ==
Heloo was a Christian and was married. She died on 25 December 2024, at the age of 70.
