= Sefwi Debiso =

- Town
- Location within Ghana
- Coordinates: 6.6615°N 3.093°W
- Country: Ghana
- Region: Western North Region
- District: Bia West District
- Time zone: GMT
  - Summer (DST): GMT

Sefwi Debiso is a town in the Bia West District in the Western North Region of Ghana. It is a central town located between three major towns: Essam, Sefwi Adabokrom and Adwuofua. Because of rapid expansion, Debiso has conurbated with the nearby Community Essam. Presently, Sefwi Debiso & Essam serve as co-capitals of the Bia West District. There are direct distant routes from Debiso to major towns such as Kumasi, Berekum, Mim Ahafo, Sefwi-Wiawso and republic of Ivory Coast. Debiso is known for producing cocoa and timber. Debiso is also noted for the Bia National Park.

== History ==
The settlement of Sefwi-Debiso was founded on hunting expedition. By 1890s, large number of people travelled to this area to hunt for bush meat (wild animals) as a commercial activity. The preserved meat were smoked and sent to places like Dunkwa-On-Offin, Mim Ahafo and Berekum for market. In the early 1900s, a new wave of migrants came to settle in Debiso not because of hunting and game (bush meat) activities but people who were in search of the then lucrative rubber tree (funtumia elastic) and the vine form of it (landolphia warensis). The forest region of Debiso was populated with the wild rubber trees. Influx of people from Fante, Akyem, Assin, Denkyira and as far as Sierra Leone came to occupy available lands to pursue the rubber plantation business where by the sap of the wild rubber tree were corrected and sent to the coastal areas to trade with the Europeans. From the 1920s, another wave of migrants began to settle in Debiso for the cultivation of cocoa. Among the migrants who came to engage in cocoa farming activities were the Asantes, Bonos, Kusasis and Ewes. Presently, Debiso host to more migrant farmers than the indigenous farmers.

== Economy ==
Agriculture: The fundamental occupation of residents of Debiso is farming, which is cultivation of cash crops and food crops. The predominant cash crops grown in this area is cocoa. In terms of employment and income generation, with about 80% of the working population engaged in this sector which constitutes the main source of household income. There are three (3) prominent types of farming activities in this area are livestock farming, food and cash crop farming. The most predominant amongst these cash crop productions is cocoa which constitute a greater percentage of the farmers in Debiso and surrounding communities.

== Tourism ==
Debiso has quite a number of potential tourist attractions including the Bia National Park, Monumental Stones, and the Yam Festival Alluolue Festival.

== Festival ==
The chiefs and people of Sefwi Debiso traditional area cerebrate the Alluolue Festival. This festival is celebrated to mark an event that took place in the past. The festival is claimed to bring together people for the planning of development and sew bonds of unity and friendship. During the festival, visitors are welcomed to share food and drinks. The people put on traditional clothes and there is durbar of chiefs. There is also dancing and drumming.

== Education ==
Notable educational institutions in Debiso are: Bia Senior High & Technical school and Bia Lamplighter College of Education.
