= Atronie =

Community in the Sunyani Municipality

Coordinates: 7°09′09″N 2°24′19″W

Atronie is a town in the Sunyani Municipal in the Bono Region of Ghana. Atonie has a population of 29,748. The native language of the Atronie people is the Bono Twi.

The current chief of the town is called Odiawisie Boamponsem Darko II. Most of the inhabitants are farmers who are into the cultivation of cocoa, cashew, mangoes, plantain and others.

== Notable people ==
- Justina Owusu - Banahene : The Bono Regional Minister
