= Transforming Teaching, Education & Learning =

Non-profit organisation

Transforming Teaching, Education & Learning (T-TEL)
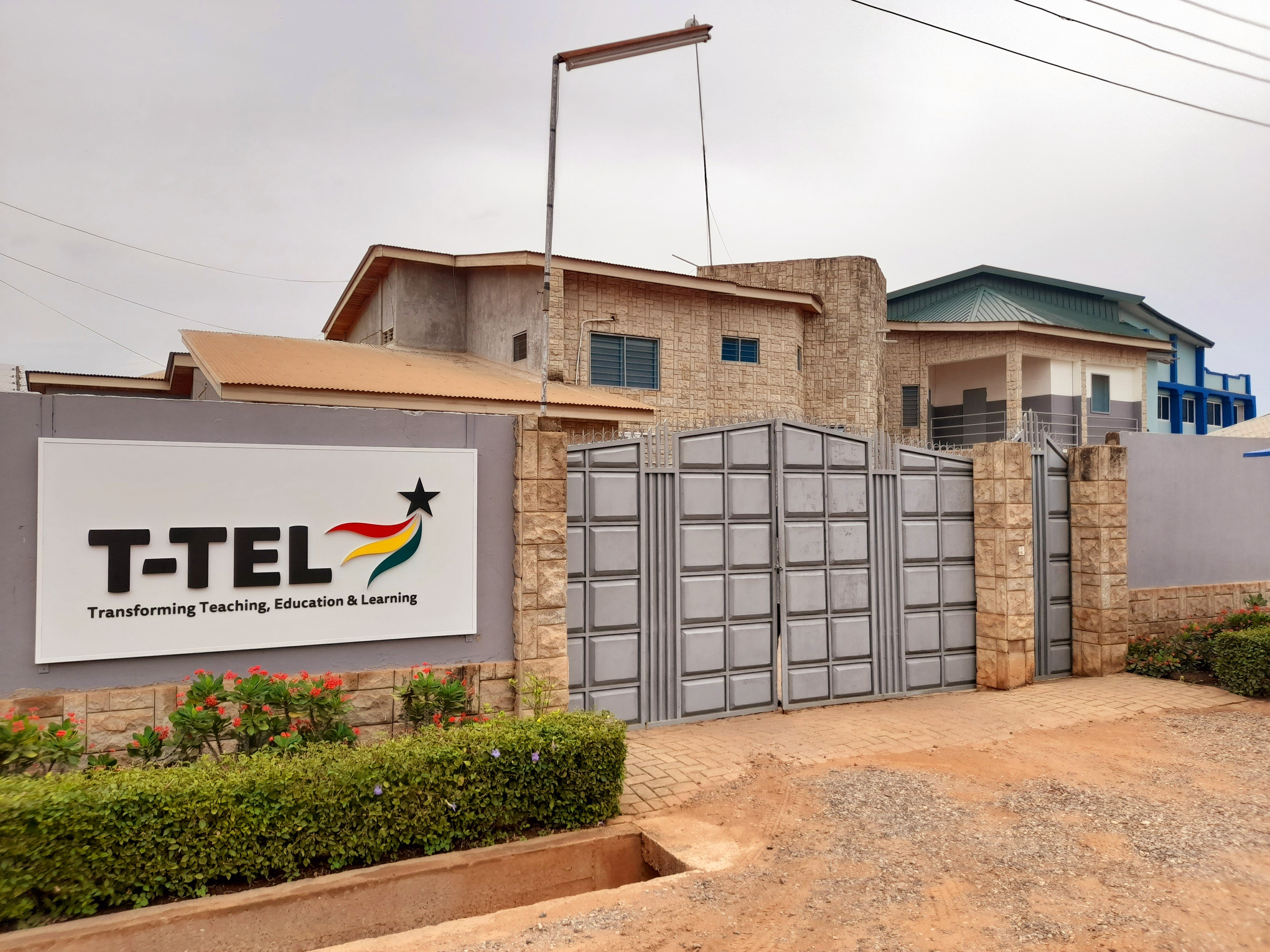
- T-TEL Head Office, Accra

Not-for-profit Organisation overview
- Formed: 2020
- Jurisdiction: Ghana
- Headquarters: East Legon, Accra
- Website: t-tel.org

Transforming Teaching, Education & Learning (T-TEL) is a Ghanaian not-for-profit organization that provides technical advice, project management, research and implementation support services using local expertise to advance Ghana's education system. T-TEL was established on 7 July 2020 as an independent Ghanaian not-for-profit organization by fifteen (15) subscribers. The subscribers are the legal custodians of the organization.

T-TEL's vision is "Transformed Education for Development".

== History ==
The Transforming Teacher Education and Learning programme started in November 2014 to support the 46 public colleges of education to improve teacher education. The late Vice President of Ghana, Paa Kwesi Amissah - Arthur launched the programme in December 2015. In December, 2018 the programme was extended for a further two years (December 2020) to support the transition period of the four-year Bachelors of Education (B.Ed.) degree, which replaced the Diploma in Basic Education (DBE) in October 2018.

Transforming Teaching, Education & Learning was established on 7 July 2020 after successful completion of the initial teacher education project so that T-TEL could continue supporting Ghana's education system.

== Activities ==
The Transforming Teacher Education and Learning programme was designed to address poor learning outcomes by improving tutoring in colleges of education so that newly qualified teachers move away from rote learning and become better prepared to use interactive methods and their subject knowledge in the classroom.

T-TEL is implementing the following projects.

Transforming Senior High School Education, Teaching and Learning (T-SHEL) project.

Transforming Senior High School Education, Teaching and Learning (T-SHEL) is a Government of Ghana programme implemented in partnership with Mastercard Foundation.

District Change Project: Managing for Learning

The District Managing for Learning Programme is a Government of Ghana initiative implemented by the Ministry of Education (MoE) and the Ghana Education Service (GES) and facilitated by T-TEL with funding from Jacobs Foundation. This collaboration will ensure adaptive learning ecosystems are developed within districts and communities to provide all children with the knowledge, skills, attitudes, tools and equitable opportunities to reach their full learning potential and thrive together.

DeliverEd

DeliverEd is a research project implemented by T-TEL in partnership with the University of Toronto and the University of Oxford.

EdTech Hub, COVID-19 Impact Assessment Study

The COVID-19 Impact Assessment study is implemented in partnership with EdTech Hub. The research seeks to establish a good understanding of the impact of Emergency Remote Teaching and Learning (ERTL) in the public Colleges of Education as a result of the COVID-19 pandemic.
