= Accra College of Education =

Teacher training college in Accra, Ghana

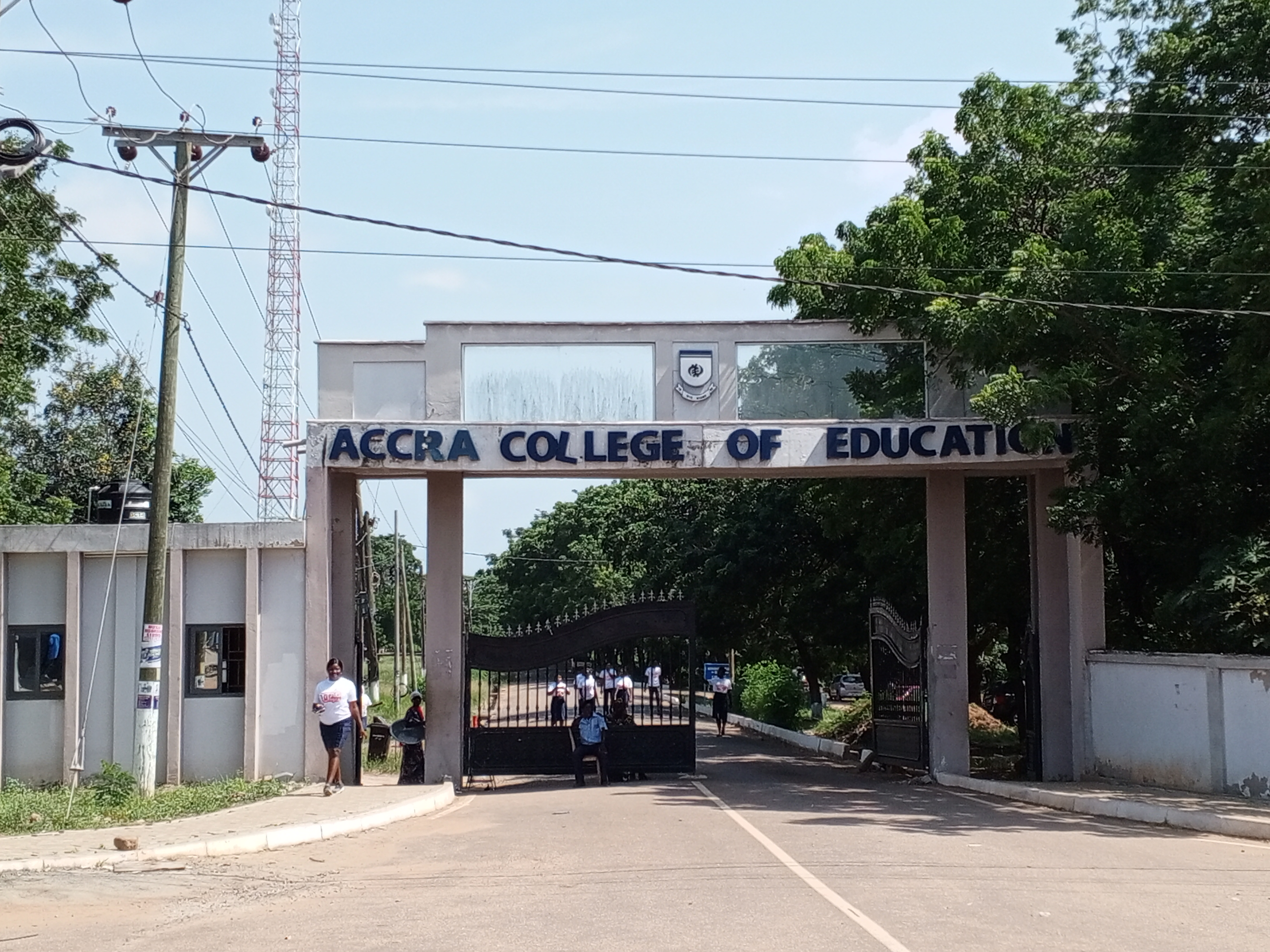
- Former name: Accra Teacher Training College
- Established: November 8, 1909
- Affiliations: Government of Ghana
- Head: Dr. Samuel Awinkene Atintono
- Location: Accra, Accra Metro, GA516, Ghana; 5.65719°N 0.16094°W
- Language: English
- Region Zone: Greater Accra; Eastern / Greater Accra
- Short name: ACCE
- Website: http://acce.edu.gh/
- Source: An Atlas of The Forty Colleges of Education in Ghana.

Accra College of Education is a teacher education college in Accra (Accra Metro, Greater Accra, Ghana). The college is located in the Greater Accra Region East Legon. It is one of the 46 Public Colleges of Education. The college participated in the DFID-funded T-TEL program.

As of May 2019, the college is affiliated with the University of Ghana. The college offers courses such as Junior High School, Primary Education and Early Childhood Education Studies.

Junior High School Education includes courses such as Mathematics, ICT, Science, Geography, Social Studies, and languages such as English Language, Twi, RME, Ewe', Fanti and Ga.

== Location ==
The college is situated at Legon-Madina in the Greater Accra Region.

== History ==
The Accra College of Education was formerly called Accra Teacher Training College (ATTRACO). It was formed on November 8, 1909. The college started with 24 students, and the first principal was Mr. W. H. Baker. Accra College of Education was opened on November 15, 1962 in a one-story building at Accra New Town as the Government Teacher Training College. The college was founded as a day training college with 19 students and eight members of staff, notable among whom were Messrs Kodjo Haizel and F.N. Gberbie, both of whom became principals of the college. The college was relocated at its present site at East Legon on 10 January, It became a boarding institution in 2001. By 2022, a clinic with a resident nurse had been added to the college's infrastructure.

The College has run the following programmes since its foundation:

- Certificate ‘A’ 4-year Post Middle
- Certificate ‘A’ 2-year Post Secondary
- 2-year Modular Post Middle for Pupil Teachers.
- Certificate ‘A’ 3- year Post Secondary (Group One)
- Certificate ‘A’ 3-year Post Secondary (Group Two)
- 3-year Diploma in Basic Education.
- Untrained Teachers 4-year Diploma in Basic Education.
- 4-years Bachelor of Education.

Although, the college remained the only day teacher training college in the country until 2001, it performed very well both academically and professionally. It has produced many graduates who have distinguished themselves in various spheres of national life. Several former students and tutors of the college have also received the best Teacher Awards. In 2007, the college won the Inter-Colleges Spelling ‘B’ Competition at the zonal level.

Accra Training College was honoured by a visit from the first lady of the President of the United States of America, Mrs. Laura Bush and the President of the Republic of Ghana, H.E. John Kufuor to launch a programme to produce reading materials for Basic Schools in 2006. Physical Education students of Accra Training College cation go through a programme called the ‘Right to Play’ which is an athlete-driven, international humanitarian organization that use play and sports for the development of children, and the youth in areas of the world affected by poverty, sickness and war. The Physical Education department took part in the ‘Nike Fine aside show down’ soccer tournament held at the Trade Fair Centre. The College team qualified to the final round of the competition. The college hosts all the Face-to-Face meetings of students and lecturers of the University of Education, Winneba for the Distance education programme. The current enrolment of students in 2007 was made up of 507 male 300 female students.

List of principals:
Name	Years served
Mr. I. B. Ama Hesse	1962–1972
Rev. Kodjo Haizel	1972–1977
Mr. Ferdinard Narh Gberbie	1978–1988
Mr. Emmanuel Kwahie Kassah	1988–1999
Mr. Abubakar Wallace	2000–2007
Mrs. Christina Bampo Henaku	2007–2018
Mr. Samuel Awinkini Atintono	2018 To Date

== Education ==
The college has six departments and offers various programmes.

=== Departments ===
1. Vocational Skills
2. Languages
3. Science
4. Education Studies
5. Mathematics & ICT
6. Social Sciences
7. Computer lap

=== Programmes offered. ===
1. B.Ed. Early Grade Education
2. B.Ed. Primary Education
3. B.Ed. JHS Education

== Prominent Alumni ==
1. Prof. Christopher Okpoti Adjei
2. Fred Kwesi Agbenyo - He is a Ghanaian Politician and communicator wwho obtained his Teacher Cert "A" at Accra College of Education.
