= Al-Faruq College of Education =

College in Wenchi, Ghana

- Wenchi, Brong Ahafo

Information
- Religious affiliation: Islam
- Established: 1991
- Principal: Mr. Wahab Sualihu
- Affiliation: University for Development Studies

Al-Faruq College of Education is a co-educational college of education in Wenchi, Brong-Ahafo Region, Ghana. It is one of 46 public colleges of education in Ghana and participated in the DFID-funded T-TEL programme. The current principal is Mr. Wahab Sualiha (Ag.). The college is affiliated with the University for Development Studies, Ghana.

== Education ==
The college offers programmes in General Basic Education, Early Childhood Education and Arabic Education.

== History ==
Al-Faruq is the first Islamic college of education in Ghana. It was set-up by the Iqra Foundation Education and Development in 1991. It became a public college in 2016.

The college signed an MOU with the University of Education, Winneba in 2016, which agreed that the university would support the college with mentoring and the capacity building of its staff.
