= Hohoe North (Ghana parliament constituency) =

Constituency in Ghana

- constituency for the Parliament of Ghana
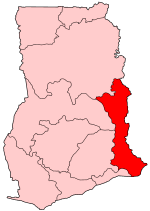
- District: Hohoe Municipal District
- Region: Volta Region of Ghana

Current constituency
- Party: National Democratic Congress
- MP: Prince Jacob Hayibor

Hohoe North is one of the constituencies represented in the Parliament of Ghana. It elects one Member of Parliament (MP) by the first past the post system of election. Hohoe North is located in the Hohoe Municipal district of the Volta Region of Ghana.

== Boundaries ==
The constituency is located within the Hohoe Municipal district of the Volta Region of Ghana. Its southern neighbour is the Hohoe South constituency.

== Members of Parliament ==
| Election | Member | Party |
|---|---|---|
| 1996 | Nathaniel Kwadzo Aduadjoe | National Democratic Congress |
| 2004 | Prince Jacob Hayibor | National Democratic Congress |

== Elections ==
2008 Ghanaian parliamentary election: Hohoe North Ghana Home Page
| Party | Candidate | Votes | % | ±% |
|---|---|---|---|---|
| National Democratic Congress | Prince Jacob Hayibor | 28,169 | 73.5 | −3.3 |
| New Patriotic Party | John Peter Amewu | 8,224 | 21.5 | 1.4 |
| Democratic Freedom Party | Mordzinu Benedictus Kwaku | 1,242 | 3.2 | — |
| Convention People's Party | Paul Robert Addo | 366 | 1.0 | 0.1 |
| People's National Convention | Victor Nyaxo | 314 | 0.8 | −0.4 |
| Majority | | 19,945 | 52.0 | −4.7 |
| Turnout | | | | — |

2004 Ghanaian parliamentary election: Hohoe North Source:National Electoral Commission, Ghana
| Party | Candidate | Votes | % | ±% |
|---|---|---|---|---|
| National Democratic Congress | Prince Jacob Hayibor | 36,400 | 76.8 | 5.5 |
| New Patriotic Party | John Peter Amewu | 9,061 | 20.1 | −5.5 |
| People's National Convention | Abusuasem Fortune Thomas | 534 | 1.2 | −5.2 |
| Independent | Philip Afeavo | 448 | 1.0 | — |
| Convention People's Party | Linus Victory Fianyo | 425 | 0.9 | −2.3 |
| Majority | | 27,339 | 56.7 | 11.0 |
| Turnout | | 45,080 | 86.6 | — |

2000 Ghanaian parliamentary election: Hohoe North Source:Adam Carr's Election Archives
| Party | Candidate | Votes | % | ±% |
|---|---|---|---|---|
| National Democratic Congress | Nathaniel Kwadzo Aduadjoe | 26,934 | 71.3 | — |
| New Patriotic Party | ? | 9,686 | 25.6 | — |
| People's National Convention | Sylvester Tobo Ahorklui | 2,431 | 6.4 | — |
| Convention People's Party | Linus Victory K Fianyo | 1,209 | 3.2 | — |
| United Ghana Movement | Delase K Harmony | 518 | 1.4 | — |
| Majority | | 17,248 | 45.7 | — |

== See also ==
- List of Ghana Parliament constituencies
