= Kibi Presbyterian College of Education =

Teacher training college in Eastern region, Ghana

- Motto: Anwemfo Mapa
- Motto in English: Real Weavers
- Established: October 1963
- Affiliations: Government of Ghana
- Academic affiliations: University of Cape Coast
- Principal: Rev. Charles Fosu-Ayarkwa
- Location: Kibi, East Akim Municipal District, EE0051, Ghana; 6.15412°N 0.56171°W
- Language: English
- Region Zone: Eastern; Eastern / Greater Accra
- Short name: KPCE (Kitco)
- Website: https://kpce.edu.gh
- Source: An Atlas of The Forty Colleges of Education in Ghana.

Kibi Presbyterian College of Education is a teacher education college in Kibi (East Akim Municipal District, Eastern Region, Ghana). The college is located in the Eastern or Greater Accra zone. It is one of about 40 public colleges of education in Ghana. The college participated in the DFID-funded T-TEL programme.

== History ==
The College was founded in October 1963. Miss Martha Baehler was the Principal of the college and had an initial staff of six. Eighty female students were admitted to pursue the four-year post middle course. In the early years, the staff and students had to contend with the problem of inadequate accommodation. An administration block was built for the college in 1966. Work on a dormitory block and a classroom block started in 1965. By the 1966/67 academic year the college had a total enrollment of about 200. The accommodation problem was still prevalent. Only 3 of the 16 staff were residents of the compound. The crowning moment of the early years of struggle for the establishment of a future great College came with the holding of a Commendation Service for the first batch of students to pass out at Kibi Presbyterian Church with the Moderator, Rt. Rev. G.K. Sintim Misa as the officiating minister.

Between 1970 and 1980, a number of staff bungalows, a five –unit classroom block, a two-storey dormitory block, and a Home Science block with a practice house were built. In 1972 some buildings at the premises of Kibi Men's Training College, which had been phased out a year earlier were given to the college. In 1976, the College became co-educational with the admission of sixteen male students. It was then renamed Kibi Presbyterian Training College. The courses pursued by students continued to be the four-year post-middle programme until 1988, when the four-year course was phased out countrywide and replaced with the three-year post secondary course.

The last batch of four-year students, and the first batch of three- year post secondary students passed out in 1991. The period from the second half of the 1990s to the present has been marked by considerable face-lift and upgrading. Classrooms, dormitories, a library and staff bungalows have been rehabilitated. The course offered was upgraded to Diploma in Basic Education in October 2004. On September 1, 2007 the college was granted accreditation as a tertiary institution. The vision of the founders has been fulfilled - the products permeate all walks of life and are making significant contributions to educational and general national development.

List of principals:
Name	Years served
Miss Martha Baehler	1963 – 1969
Mrs. Elizabeth Addo	1970 – 1980
Rev. Bruce K. Asare	1980 – 1988
Mr. E.O. Gyarteng	1988 –1995
Rev. E.Y. Omenako	1995 - 2013
Rev. Dr. B. N. Kyeremateng	2013 - 2017
Rev. Charles Fosu Ayarkwa	2017 -

== Education ==
The Kibi Presbyterian College of Education offers various Bachelor of Education programmes (B.Ed). The college also has counselling programs for its graduating teacher trainees.

=== Programmes offered ===
- B.Ed. Early Childhood Education
- B. Ed. Primary Education
- B.Ed. Science & Mathematics
- B. Ed I.C.T & Mathematics
- B. Ed Science & I.C.T
- B.Ed. Technical & Vocational
- B. Ed. Social Studies
- B.Ed. French
- B.Ed. General

== Facilities ==
The college has the following facilities on campus;

- An Ultra modern Auditorium, Various storey dormitories for males and female, the E. O. Gyarteng Library
- Ultra-modern J. O. Y. Mante 5 storey lecture hall with offices like modernize library and ICT lab.
- New Modern Nana Addo Dankwa Akufo-Addo Auditorium
- Lecturers bungalows
- Paved roads
- Etc.
