= St. Vincent College of Education =

Location
- Yendi, Northern Region

Information
- Established: 2016
- Affiliation: University for Development Studies, Government of Ghana

St. Vincent College of Education is a co-educational college of education in Yendi (Northern Zone, Ghana). It is one of 46 public colleges of education in Ghana and participated in the DFID-funded T-TEL programme. Dr. Erasmus Norviewu-Mortty is the current principal.

The college is affiliated to the University for Development Studies, Ghana.

== Education ==
In the 2017/18 academic year, the college admitted 153 students.

== History ==
In 2016, St. Vincent ran a trial semester and signed a memorandum of understanding (MOU) with the University of Education, Winneba agreeing mentoring support from the university to the college.
