= Tumu College of Education =

Public College in Ghana

- Affiliations: Government of Ghana
- Location: Tumu, Sissala East Municipal, XS00091, Ghana; 10.89266°N 1.98463°W
- Language: English
- Region Zone: Upper West; Northern Zone
- Short name: Tutco
- Source: An Atlas of The Forty Colleges of Education in Ghana.

Tumu College of Education is a teacher education college in Tumu (Sissala East District, Upper West Region, Ghana). The college is located in Northern Zone zone. It is one of the 46 public colleges of education in Ghana. The college participated in the DFID-funded T-TEL programme. The institution has awarded Diploma Certificates to 1,322 graduates for the sandwich courses in Early Childhood/Basic Education Certificates between 2013 and 2017.

== History ==
Tumu College of Education was established on 1 September 1984. However, the first batch of students, numbering 65 reported to college on 3 January 1985. The teaching staff was six. The College is on the premises of former Tumu Middle Boarding School.

The vision of the College is to become a distinguished College of Education and an eminent institution of learning in Ghana. Its mission is to train very hardworking, competent and dedicated basic school teachers who will like to teach in the rural areas of Ghana.

The structures that the college settled in were constructed in 1954. It was only in recent times that renovation works were carried on by the German Technical Cooperation (GTZ). The following structures have also been provided for the college by the GETFund. They are a 3-unit Lecture Hall, Modern Library and an Assembly Hall Complex. Another remarkable achievement since the establishment of the college is the provision of a Demonstration School by the Sissala East District Assembly in collaboration with the Luggard Trust, Action Aid Ghana, the Parent Teacher Association, and the European Union which attached an Early Childhood Care and Development centre to the Demonstration School. The Demonstration School has contributed immensely to teacher preparation in the college.

List of Principals
Name	Years served
Mr. Alhassan A. Jangu	1984 – 1992
Mr. C. K Gyang	1992 – 2008
Mr. Dramani Tampuori (Ag.)	2008

== Programmes ==
The programmes the college has run since its foundation are:

1. Certificate ‘A’ 4 year Post Middle

2. 3-year Certificate ‘A’ Post-Secondary

3. Diploma in Basic Education (DBE)

4. Untrained Teachers Diploma in Basic Education (UTDBE)

5. Certificate ‘A’ four-year by distance for untrained teachers.
