= Prince Jacob Hayibor =

Ghanaian politician

MP for Hohoe North
- In office 7 January 2005 – 6 January 2013
- Preceded by: Nathaniel Kwadzo Aduadjoe
- Succeeded by: Constituency merged

Personal details
- Born: 12 September 1962 Gbi-Wegbe, Volta Region Ghana)
- Died: 2016 (aged 53–54)
- Party: National Democratic Congress
- Education: University of Cape Coast, Ghana
- Occupation: Politician
- Profession: Educationist

Prince Jacob Hayibor (12 September 1962 – 2016) was a Ghanaian politician who served as the member of parliament for the Hohoe North Constituency in the Volta Region of Ghana.

== Early life and education ==
Hayibor was born on 12 September 1962 and hailed from Gbi-Wegbe, a town in the Volta Region of Ghana. He obtained his Master of Art in English from the University of Ghana in 1996. He further had his Post Graduate Diploma in Education from the University of Cape Coast in 2001. He also had his Executive Masters in Governance and Leadership from Ghana Institute of Management and Public Administration in 2008.

== Career ==
Hayibor was an Educationist. He was the Principal Superintendent and a tutor at Obuasi Secondary/Technical School.

== Politics ==
Hayibor was a member of National Democratic Congress. He was the member of parliament for Hohoe North Constituency in the Volta region of Ghana. He was the former Chairman of the Savannah Accelerated Development Authority. He won 28,169 out of 38,315 votes valid votes caste representing 73.5%. He won against John-Peter Amewu of the New Patriotic Party with 8,225 votes representing 21.5% of the votes Mordzinu Benedictus Kwaku of the Democratic Freedom Party with 1,242 votes representing 3.2%, Paul Robert Addo of the Convention Peoples Party with 366 votes representing 1% and Victor Nyaxo of the Peoples National Convention with 314 votes representing 0.8%.

== Personal life ==
Hayibor was married with four children. He was a Christian and a member of the Seventh Day Adventist Church.

== Death ==
Hayibor passed on in 2016, at the age of 54.
