= Hohoe (Ghana parliament constituency) =

Constituency in Ghana

- constituency for the Parliament of Ghana
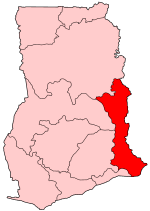
- District: Hohoe Municipal District
- Region: Volta Region of Ghana

Current constituency
- Party: National Democratic Congress
- MP: Thomas Worlanyo Tsekpo

Hohoe is one of the constituencies represented in the Parliament of Ghana. It elects one Member of Parliament (MP) by the first past the post system of election. Thomas Worlanyo Tsekpo is the member of parliament for the constituency. Hohoe is located in the Hohoe Municipal district of the Volta Region of Ghana.

== Boundaries ==
The constituency is located within the Hohoe Municipality in the Volta Region of Ghana.

== Members of Parliament ==
First elected	Member	Party
Hohoe South constituency
1992	Kosi Kedem	National Democratic Congress
2004	Joseph Zaphenat Amenowode	National Democratic Congress
2012	Hohoe constituency	
2012	Bernice Adiku Heloo	National Democratic Congress
2020	John Peter Amewu	New Patriotic Party
2024	Thomas Worlanyo Tsekpo	National Democratic Congress

== Election results ==
2024 Ghanaian general election: Hohoe
Party	Candidate	Votes	%	±%
NDC	Thomas Worlanyo Tsekpo	31,163	67.41	+22.66
NPP	John Peter Amewu	14,971	32.39	−22.87
NDP	Esther Amevor	55	0.12	+0.12
People's National Convention (Ghana)	Stephen Dzidefo Adzraku	39	0.08	—
Majority		16,192	35.02	—
Turnout		46,542	—	—
Registered electors		—		

2020 Ghanaian general election: Hohoe
Party	Candidate	Votes	%	±%
NPP	John Peter Amewu	26,952	55.26	
NDC	Margaret Kweku	21,821	44.74	
CPP	Oyie William	0	0.00	—
NDP	Bali Emmanuel	0	0.00	
Majority		—	—	—
Turnout		—	—	—
Registered electors		—		

2016 Ghanaian general election: Hohoe
Party	Candidate	Votes	%	±%
National Democratic Congress	Bernice Adiku Heloo	35,437	82.93	
New Patriotic Party	Marlon Praises Anipa	6,462	15.12	
Democratic People's Party	Justine Kumordzi	383	0.90	—
Progressive People's Party	Ameckson Frank Sellasie	269	0.63	—
Convention People's Party	Wisdom Kweku Adetor	179	0.42	—
Independent	David Kofi Ahose	0	0.00	—
Majority				
Turnout		42,730		—

2012 Ghanaian general election: Hohoe
Party	Candidate	Votes	%	±%
National Democratic Congress	Bernice Adiku Heloo	40,486	81.58	
New Patriotic Party	Janet Emefa Obro - Adibo	6,358	12.81	
Progressive People's Party	Agbenorwosi Rich - Doh	2,462	4.96	—
People's National Convention	Cecil - Rhodes Dogbe	193	0.39	—
Convention People's Party	Kutuadu Beauty	129	0.26	—
Majority				
Turnout		49,628		—

The Electoral Commission of Ghana changed constituency configurations prior to the 2008 elections with Hohoe North constituency changed and what was left of Hohoe South becoming Hohoe constituency.

2008 Ghanaian parliamentary election: Hohoe South
Party	Candidate	Votes	%	±%
National Democratic Congress	Joseph Zaphenat Amenowode	18,340	92.0	4.2
New Patriotic Party	Hayford Kugblenu	1,489	7.5	−4.7
Democratic People's Party	Keteku Prosper Mawuko Korsi	99	0.5	—
Democratic Freedom Party	Forster Kpordzih	0	0	—
Majority		17,851	84.5	8.9
Turnout				—

2004 Ghanaian parliamentary election: Hohoe South
Party	Candidate	Votes	%	±%
National Democratic Congress	Joseph Zaphenat Amenowode	20,579	87.8	40.5
New Patriotic Party	Delali Ndo	2,859	12.2	−20.0
Majority		17,720	75.6	60.5
Turnout		23,438	88.5	—

2000 Ghanaian parliamentary election: Hohoe South
Party	Candidate	Votes	%	±%
National Democratic Congress	Kosi Kedem	13,306	47.3	—
New Patriotic Party	Bennett K. Dokey	9,043	32.2	—
	Delali Ndo	4,489	16.0	—
Convention People's Party	James Flolu	834	3.0	—
National Reform Party	Brese R. Senyo	450	1.6	—
Majority		4,263	15.1	—

== See also ==
- List of Ghana Parliament constituencies
