= St. Louis College of Education =

- Established: 1962
- Affiliations: University of Education, Winneba
- Religious affiliation: Roman Catholic
- Principal: MONICA KONNIE MENSAH (MRS)
- Location: Kumasi, Kumasi Metro District, AK015, Ghana; 6.70723°N 1.62540°W
- Language: English
- Region Zone: Ashanti; Ashanti / Brong Ahafo
- Source: An Atlas of The Forty Colleges of Education in Ghana.

Introduction

St. Louis College of Education is a teacher education college in Kumasi (Kumasi Metro District, Ashanti Region, Ghana). The college is located in Ashanti / Brong Ahafo zone. It is one of the about 46 public colleges of education in Ghana. The college participated in the DFID-funded T-TEL programme. It was founded in September 1960 by the Kumasi Catholic Diocese and is affiliated to the University of Education, Winneba. It has always trained women but trained men for a brief period between 1974 and 1981.

== History ==
In September 1960, the Catholic Diocese of Kumasi established St. Louis College of Education. The first principal was Sr. Mary Consilli. She was assisted by Sr. Mary Vibiana and three other members of staff. The pioneer students were thirty-five with Miss Grace Owusu as the College prefect. Nana Otumfuo Osei Agyeman Prempeh II donated a vast expanse of land for the establishment of the college, but unfortunately the land has been encroached upon, making it impossible for the expansion of infrastructural facilities. The teething problem that faced the college in its early days was funding. In view of that, it was run with funds from the salaries of the Principal and her Vice, as well as support from the Catholic Diocese of Kumasi, funding agencies abroad and other local well-wishers. Since its establishment, the college has gone through the following programmes: 4-year Post Middle Certificate ‘A’, 2-year Post Secondary Certificate ‘A’, 3-year Post Secondary Certificate ‘A’, and it is now running 3-year Diploma in Basic Education. It has been accredited as a tertiary institution since September, 2007.

The College has always trained women except for a short period from 1974/75 to 1980/81 academic years when it trained men as well. In the 1997/98 academic year, the College became the first women's teacher training college in Ghana to run a Science course sponsored by the Rockefeller Foundation through Female education in Mathematics and Science Association which was introduced in the 2004/05 academic year. The College has total staff strength of 112, made up of 59 teaching staff and 53 non-teaching staff. The total regular students population for 2007/08 academic year stands at 906. The college runs Diploma in basic Education programme for 640 untrained teachers and 1,614 Certificate ‘A’ teachers on sandwich basis. The academic performance of students of the college has been encouraging over the years. The college came first in the Quiz Competition organized among the ten training colleges of Ashanti-Brong/Ahafo (ASHBA Zone). Again, it took the first position in the National Spelling ‘Bee’ Competition organized by the University of Cape Coast at the zonal level, and became the first Runner-up at the national level. In sports, St. Louis Training College has an enviable record at the ASHBA zonal level, and has contributed largely to the women's contingent for the zone at the National Teacher Training College Games.

Other remarkable achievements include the Ashanti Best teacher training College Golden Jubilee Independence March-past Award 2007, and also placing first in Ghana's Golden Jubilee Anniversary Singing Competition in Ashanti Region. The college has limited land for the expansion of infrastructural facilities. However, the following projects have been executed in recent times: 16 Unit-Classroom Block funded by the GETFund, ICT Centre, a modern Library and a Resource Centre all of which were executed with internally generated funds. The college has a Student Representative Council Office, and a Counseling Centre that serves not only the students, but also basic school pupils in the immediate catchment area. Despite the efforts to meet the challenges of the college, there is still more to be done in the areas of infrastructure and transportation.

The following are the principals who have served the college since its establishment,
Name	Years served
Sr. Mary Consilli	1960 – 1979
Mrs. Rosemond Asante-Frimpong	1979 – 1997
Ms. Georgina Darling Ofori	1997 – 2006
Mrs. Mary Anane Druyeh	2007 - 2013
Rev. Fr. Francis Ababio	2013 (Acting)
Dame (Mrs.) Mary Comfort Boakye Mensah	2013 to date
