= Godenu =

Gbi Godenu
- Ville
- Location of Gbi Godenu in Volta Region
- Coordinates: 7°6′13″N 0°27′5″E
- Country: Ghana
- Region: Volta Region
- District: Hohoe Traditional Area (GBI Dzigbe)
- Elevation: 535 m (1,755 ft)

Population (2017)
  - Total: 13.000
- Time zone: GMT
  - Summer (DST): GMT

Gbi-Godenu is a divisional chieftaincy of the traditional area of Hohoe recognized within of the Constitution of Ghana and legislation regulating the "Headquarters" in Ghanaian society. It is located in the Volta River region of Ghana.

The current traditional chief of Godenu is Togbe Osei III. He is owes allegiance to the Fiaga of Gbi.

Name Godenu means Be Steadfast with God.

The Gbi-Godenu area covers 18 square kilometers with approximately 13,000 inhabitants in four places near Hohoe.

== Talking River ==
A tourist attraction and enigmatic symbol of Godenu is the so-called "Talking River". According to tradition the river communicates with the ancients, the togbe (even those of the neighboring towns and cities) and other persons of "strong spirit" and in a sort of oracle points the way forward, including for the future of the town of Godenu itself . Another attraction of the river is its small islets, some with denser vegetation cover and others made of stones, which give the landscape its shape.

== Help Godenu ==
Help Godenu - Help for Godenu "is a non-profit association dedicated to the education, health and peaceful coexistence of religions in the Kingdom of Godenu.
