= Adama Sulemana =

Ghanaian politician

Hon. Adama Sulemana
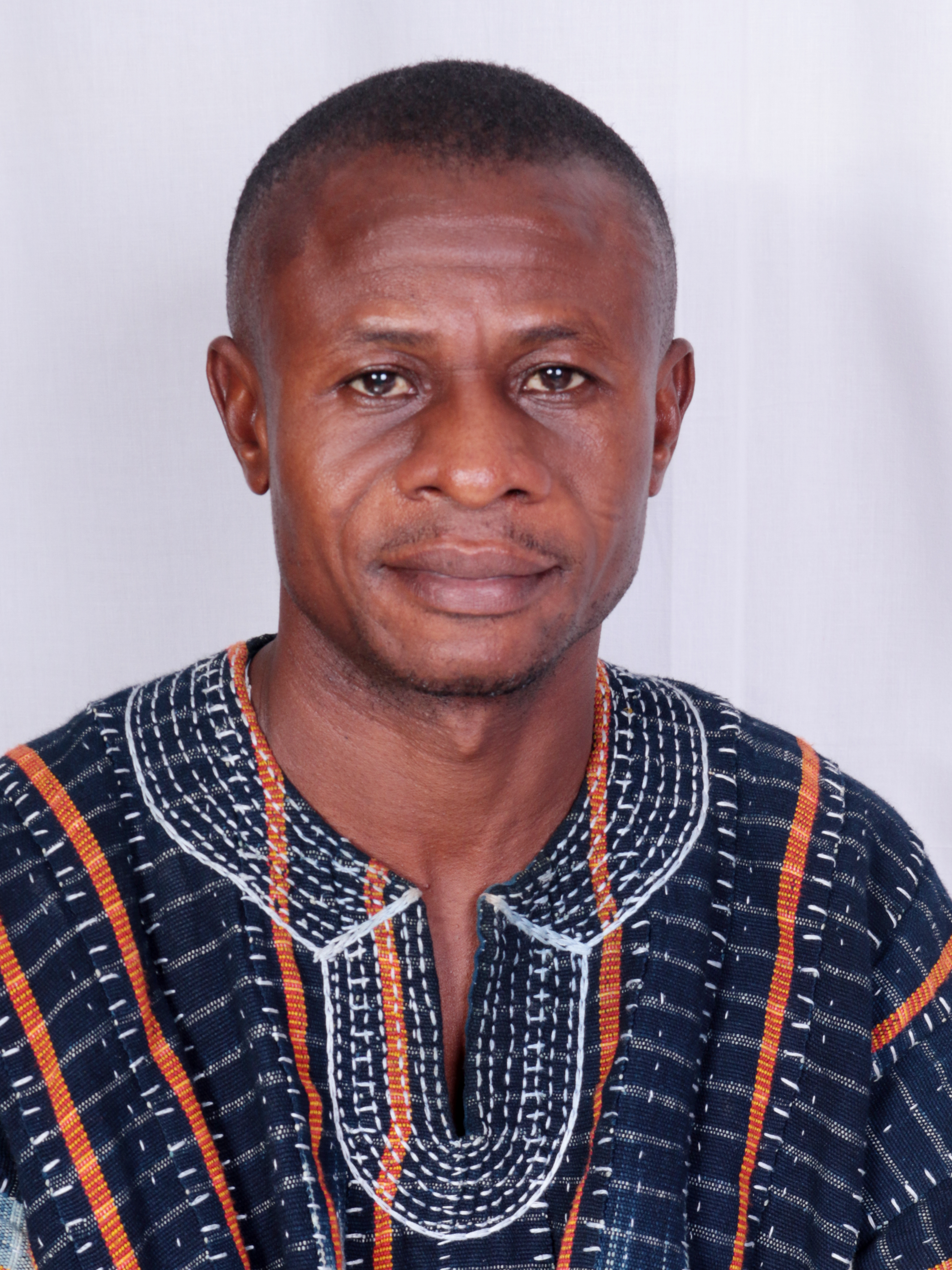

Member of Parliament for Tain Constituency
- Incumbent
- Assumed office 7 January 2021
- Preceded by: Gabriel Osei

Personal details
- Born: Adama Sulemana; 6 June 1978 (age 48) Nsawkaw, Ghana
- Party: National Democratic Congress
- Occupation: Politician
- Committees: Standing Orders Committee, Communications Committee

Adama Sulemana is a Ghanaian politician and member of parliament for the Tain constituency in the Bono region of Ghana.

== Early life and education ==
Adama was born on 6 March 1978 and hails from Nsawkaw in the Bono region of Ghana. He obtained his BECE in 1989 and also in 1992. He also received his SSSCE in 1995. He received his Bachelor of Education in Psychology in 2006 and his Masters in Philosophy in Psychology in 2009.

== Career ==
Adama was the DCE of Tain under the Ministry of Local Government and also a Health Teacher under the Ministry of Health.

=== Political career ===
Adama is a member of NDC and currently the MP for Tain Constituency. He won the parliamentary seat with 20,374 votes making 45.4% of the total votes cast whilst the NPP parliamentary aspirant Gabriel Osei had 18,346 votes making 40.9%.

=== Committees ===
Adama is a member of the Standing Orders Committee and also a member of the Communications Committee.

== Personal life ==
Adama is a Christian.
