= Offinso College of Education =

Teacher training college in Offinso, Ghana

- Established: 3 February 1955
- Affiliations: Government of Ghana
- Location: Offinso, Offinso South District, A70014, Ghana; 6.94795°N 1.68230°W
- Language: English
- Region Zone: Ashanti; Ashanti / Brong Ahafo
- Short name: Offinco
- Source: An Atlas of The Forty Colleges of Education in Ghana.

Offinso College of Education is a teacher education college in Offinso (Offinso Municipal, Ashanti Region, Ghana). The college is located in Ashanti / Brong Ahafo zone. It is one of the about 40 public colleges of education in Ghana. The college participated in the DFID-funded T-TEL programme. It was established in 1955 by the Gold Coast District of the Methodist Church as a teacher training college for women. It attained tertiary level status in September 2007 and is affiliated to the University of Cape Coast.

== History ==
In pursuance of its educational practices in the 1950s, the Gold Coast District of the Methodist Church established the Offinso College of Education – a two-year Teacher Training College for women. The college was established on 3 February 1955 with Miss M. Turnbull, serving as the first principal. The college started with 30 female students for the two year Teachers’ Certificate "B" and had as tutors, the Principal, Miss Dorothy M. Turnbull, Miss Rose Asiedu Awuah (Mrs. Rose Coker) and Miss Victoria Homiah. Mr. S. K. Arku was Clerk/Bursar. A two-storey building was provided by Opanin Kwadwo Krah. This building, for eleven year, provided the college with dormitories, staff accommodation, dining hall, Library and offices.

From the 1962/63 academic year, the two-year Certificate ‘B’ course was upgraded to four-year Certificate ‘A’ course. The college, in January 1966, moved to its permanent site. By 1971, student enrolment had increased from 60 to 300. In September 1971, the college was turned into a mixed institution with the enrolment of 70 first year male students. Seventy three male students from Aduman Training College were transferred to the college. In October 1972, Mr. Amofa Kwasi became the first male principal of the college. In 1974, the Post Secondary two-year Certificate ‘A’ course was introduced in the college. This course was replaced with the three-year Post Secondary course. It started a three-year Diploma in Basic Education programme in 2004. The college has been upgraded to the tertiary level of education since September 2007. The National Accreditation Board (Ghana) has presented a certificate to that effect. Although a Methodist affiliated institution, the Chaplaincy has given places of worship to students of all other denominations to promote religious freedom among staff and students.

Offinso College of Education after being given accreditation by the National Accreditation Board (NAB) of the Ministry of Education, it runs the following programmes:

- 3-year diploma in Basic Education for regular students (only general programme currently).
- 4-year Diploma in Basic Education (Distance programme for untrained teachers)
- 4-year Certificate A (distance programme for untrained Teachers)

Roll of Principals
Name	Years served
Ms. Dorothy M. Turnbull	Feb. 1955-Dec.1959
Ms. G.M. Ostler	Jan. 1960-Aug. 1963
Ms. Clara J. Amerin	Sept.1963-May 1964
Mrs. Susana Antwi-Nsiah	May 1964-Aug. 1971
Mrs. Hannah Martin Dolling	Sept.1971-Oct. 1972
Mr. Amos Kwasi Amofa	Oct. 1972- Dec.1973
Mr. Jacob A.K. Benson	Jan. 1974
Mr. Anthony Gaisei-Essilfie	Feb. 1974- Jan. 1981
Mrs. Lydia Afriyie Amoako	Feb. 1981- Aug. 1981
Mr. Kwabena Gyapon	Sept. 1981-Aug. 1990
Mr. Y.F. Okra	Oct. 1990-Jan. 1991
Mr. A.B. Rockson	Jan. 1991-Sept. 1996
Mr. Kwame Twumasi-Ankra	Sept. 1996-Oct. 2004
Ms. Christian Agyare Boateng	Nov. 2004-April, 2005
Nana P.K Opoku	April. 2005-2010
Very Rev. Dr. Joseph Asamoah Nkyi	2010-
