= Foso College of Education =

Teacher training college in Ghana

- Motto in English: Character, Wisdom, Knowledge
- Established: November 15, 1965
- Affiliations: University of Cape Coast, Government of Ghana
- Location: Foso, Assin North Municipal District, CR0074, Ghana; 5.68330°N 1.26489°W
- Language: English
- Region Zone: Central; Central / Western
- Short name: Fosco
- Website: https://www.fosco.edu.gh/
- Source: An Atlas of The Forty Colleges of Education in Ghana.

Foso College of Education is a co-educational teacher education college in Foso (Assin North Municipal District, Central Region, Ghana). The college is located in Central / Western zone. It is one of 46 public colleges of education in Ghana and participated in the DFID-funded T-TEL programme.

The principal is Dr. Anthony Baabereyir. Foso College of Education is affiliated to the University of Cape Coast.

== History ==
Dr. Kwame Nkrumah( first president of Ghana) established Foso College in 1965. Foso College of Education popularly known as FOSCO (which is often referred to as the University of Assin by the local people) was opened on 15 November 1965 at its present site with 240 students and 9 teaching staff. The students were made up of 120 Post Middle 4-Year and 120 Post ‘B’ 2-Year Certificate ‘A’ groups. It was opened under the headship of Mr. R. R. Essah. Situated between Assin Foso and Assin Atonsu on the Assin Foso–Cape Coast highway, the college has a land area of 1 square kilometre which was leased out to the Government for the purpose by the Aboabo Stool of Assin Nyankomasi. In line with its motto: “Character, Wisdom, and Knowledge”, this motto represents the importance of good behaviour, intellectual development, and the acquisition of knowledge. The mission statement of the school is "to train professional teachers for basic schools in Ghana". And the Vision statement is "to become a centre of excellence for training quality teachers with holistic development".

The college's catchment area extends beyond the Central Region (Ghana) into the Ashanti Region, Brong-Ahafo Region, Eastern Region (Ghana), Greater Accra Region, and Western Region (Ghana). Annual student enrolment levels are always appreciably high. The student population for the 2007/2008 academic year, for instance, was 938 made up of 638 males and 300 females. 766 pupil teachers are also on the Modular UTDBE programme. The students are handled by 51 teaching staff and 59 non-teaching staff. Since its establishment, Foso Training College has turned out over 5,600 teachers, most of whom hold very responsible positions in various spheres of national and international life.

The college has grown from 240 students and 9 teaching staff in its first year to over 1600 in 2015 - 725 of whom were studying for the Diploma in Basic Education. A governing council was inaugurated in March 2019 by the Minister of State for Tertiary Education, Professor Kwesi Yankah.

The College has been headed by the following Principals since its establishment:
Name	Years served
Mr. R. R. Essah	1965 - 1975
Mr. E. A. Graham	1975 – 1980
Mr. E. O. Gyarteng	1980 – 1988
Rev. Bruce Asare	1988 – 1991
Mr. M. A. Kwofie	1991 – 1996
Mr. J. S. Ocran	1996 – 1999
Mr. J. B. K. Mensah	1999 – 2010
Dr. Nana Kwaku Asiedu	2011 – 2018
Dr. Anthony Baabereyir	2018 –

== Education ==
Foso Training College has run every pre-tertiary teacher training programme in Ghana. The programmes include the following:

(i) 4-Year Post-Middle Certificate ‘A’

(ii) 2-Year Post-Middle Certificate ‘B’

(iii) 2-Year Post ‘B’ Certificate ‘A’

(iv) 2-Year Post-Secondary Certificate ‘A’

(v) 2-Year Post ‘A’ Specialist Course in Agricultural Science

(vi) 3-Year Post-Secondary Certificate ‘A’

(vii) 3-Year Post-Secondary Specialist Course in Mathematics, Science, Agricultural Science and

(viii) 2-Year Post-Middle Certificate ‘A’ (Modular)

Even though the college has been running a Diploma in Basic Education (DBE) programme for both regular students and serving pupil teachers since 2004 and 2005 respectively, it officially received accreditation to the tertiary status in September 2007. In 2007/2008 academic year the college was mandated, in addition to other 14 colleges, to train quasi specialist teachers in Science and Mathematics for basic schools in the country.

== Notable alumni ==
- Dr. E. Fletcher: Senior Lecturer, UCC
- Mr. J. K. Taylor: Senior Lecturer, UCC
- Rev. Albert Amoah: International Director of Church of Pentecost in USA and former General Secretary of the Church of Pentecost, Ghana.
- Mr. Sammy Otoo: Proprietor of Sammo High Schools in Cape Coast.
- Ms. Naana Biney: Deputy Director-General of Ghana Education Service
- Mr. F. K. Danquah: Headmaster, Assin North Secondary School
- Mr. Bashiru Hayford: Coach of Asante Kotoko Football Club
- Prophet Marithia Jona Jehu Appiah: Former Spiritual Head of the Mosama Disco Christo Church: (MDCC)
- Mr. Kwame Fosuh: Ministry of Trade: Industries and PSI
- Mr. Kwadwo B. Filscon of GIPC.
