= Gambaga College of Education =

- Established: 2013
- Affiliations: Government of Ghana
- Location: Gambaga, East Mamprusi District, NE0001, Ghana; 10.53137°N 0.43301°W
- Language: English
- Region Zone: North East Region; Northern Zone
- Short name: GACoE
- Source: An Atlas of The Forty Colleges of Education in Ghana.

Gambaga College of Education is a teacher education college in Gambaga (East Mamprusi District, North East Region, Ghana) established in 2013. The college is located in Northern Zone. It is one of the about 46 public colleges of education in Ghana. The college participated in the DFID-funded T-TEL programme. It is affiliated with the University of Development Studies.
