= Evangelical Presbyterian College of Education, Bimbilla =

Teacher training college in Bimbilla, Ghana

- Other names: E. P. College of Education, Bimbilla
- Established: 1962
- Affiliations: Government of Ghana
- Location: Bimbilla, Nanumba North District, NN0031, Ghana; 8.87150°N 0.04833°E
- Language: English
- Region Zone: Northern Region; Northern Zone
- Short name: Bimbico
- Source: An Atlas of The Forty Colleges of Education in Ghana.

Evangelical Presbyterian College of Education, Bimbilla is a teacher education college in Bimbilla (Nanumba North District, Northern Region, Ghana). The college is located in Northern Zone zone. It is one of the about 40 public colleges of education in Ghana. The college participated in the DFID-funded T-TEL programme. The college was established in 1962 with 35 male students. It was a single sex institution until 1975 when females were allowed admission into the school.

== History ==
The college was founded in 1962 by the Evangelical Presbyterian Church, Ghana, whose headquarters is at Ho in the Volta Region. It was opened on 2 October with 35 male students and remained a single sex institution until 1975 when female students were admitted. It is a Government assisted institution.

The list of names of principals in chronological order since its inception is as follows:
Name	Years served
Adolf G. K. Adzanku	1962 to 1972
E. K. Glante	1972 to 1975
F. K. Hehemeku	1975 to 1976
G. B. Senaya	1976 to 1977
B. K. Tsetse	1977 to 1979
Benjamin A. Agalga	1979 to 1991
Marshall A. Adam	1991 to 2002
Abdulai Abu-Wemah	2002

== Programmes ==
The College was established to train four – year Certificate ‘A’ post-middle teachers for basic level schools. It ran the modular course from 1988 to 1992. It turned three – year Certificate ‘A’ post-secondary in 1989. The College ran a three – year Diploma in Basic Education programme and it is one of the colleges selected to train Science and Mathematics teachers. Since April 2005, the College has taken on board the Untrained Teachers Diploma in Basic Education (UTDBE) programme by distance which is a four-year programme.
