= TESCON =

Student wing of the New Patriotic Party (NPP) of Ghana

Tertiary Students Confederacy
- Founded: 8 January 2000
- Headquarters: Accra
- Ideology: Liberal conservatism Conservatism
- Mother party: New Patriotic Party
- Website: newpatrioticparty.org

TESCON (Tertiary Students Confederacy) is the student wing of the New Patriotic Party (NPP) of Ghana founded on 8 January 2000.

It was inaugurated by the 2nd President of the 4th Republic of Ghana, John Agyekum Kufuor. Since its formation, TESCON has been one of the most important wings of the NPP's student and political activism and grass-root mobilisation.
