= Methodist College of Education (Ghana) =

Teacher training college

- Established: 2012
- Affiliations: Government of Ghana, University of Education, Winneba
- Location: Akim Oda, Eastern Region (Ghana), Akim Oda, Birim Central Municipal District, Ghana; 5.9249423°N 0.9826035°W
- Language: English

Methodist College of Education is a teacher training institute in Ghana located in Akim Oda of the Eastern Region.

== History ==
The Methodist College of Education started operations in 2012. The college began with six staff and one hundred and seventy three students. The school is affiliated to University of Education, Winneba (UEW).
