= St. John Bosco's College of Education =

- Established: 1946
- Affiliations: Government of Ghana
- Location: Navrongo, Kassena Nankana East District, UK0114, Ghana; 10.87306°N 1.07791°W
- Language: English
- Region Zone: Upper East; Northern Zone
- Short name: Bosco
- Source: An Atlas of The Forty Colleges of Education in Ghana.

St. John Bosco's College of Education is a teacher education college in Navrongo (Kassena Nankana East District, Upper East Region, Ghana) set up in 1946 with 10 male students. The college became a public tertiary institution, established by the Colleges of Education Act (847) 2012, accredited by the National Accreditation Board Ghana, and mandated to train standard teachers for Pre-tertiary Education in Ghana.

The college is specialised in training teachers in the broad areas of Social, Agriculture and Pure Sciences, as well as Computing, Mathematics, Technical and Vocational disciplines. It is one of the about 40 public colleges of education in Ghana. The college participated in the DFID-funded T-TEL programme.

== History ==
St. John Bosco's College of Education was established in January 1946 by the Catholic Mission. Ten male students were enrolled to pursue a 2-year post middle Teacher's Certificate ‘B’ course. Out of the ten students, seven completed the course. This course ended in 1961.

St. John Bosco's has recorded several successes in academia, sports and community or social work since its establishment. The college has never scored less than 80% in yearly examinations conducted by the Institute of Education, University of Cape Coast. Several of the graduates of the college are in prominent positions in the country. In sports, the college is the pacesetter among the colleges in Northern Ghana. Bosco's has played a leading role in the education against HIV/AIDS among students in particular, and the public in the Kassena-Nankana District in general.

Principals since the establishment of the college:
Name	Years served
Rev. Fr. Chartrand	Feb. 1946 – Jan. 1954
Rev. Fr. Lebel	Jan. 1954 – Jan. 1960
Rev. Fr. Pwamang	Jan. 1960 – Sept 1972
Rev. Fr. J.W. Apuri	Sept 1972 – Aug. 1979
Mr. Blay-Toffey	Aug. 1979 – Oct. 1980
Rev. Fr. Awiah	Nov. 1980 – Mar. 1981
Mr. E.D. Zormal	Mar 1981 – May 1981
Mr. B.K. Tsetse	May 1981 – Nov. 1985
Rev. Fr. Victor Phelen	Nov. 1985 – Dec. 1986
Mr. B.J.L. Kumasi	Dec. 1986 – Sept 1989
Mrs. Rosemary Weobong	Oct. 1989 – Sept 1998
Mr. Francis Agyeere	Oct. 1998 – Feb. 2000
Mr. Alfred A. Ndago	Feb. 2000 - Aug. 2014
Mr. William A. Atindana	Sept. 2014 - Aug. 2020
Prof. Joseph Amikuzunu	Sept. 2020 - Date

== Old Programmes ==
- Certificate ‘A’ 4-year (Post Middle) 1961-1969/ 1981-1995
- Certificate 'A' 2-year (Post- Secondary) 1970-1978
- Specialist Certificate in Art Education 1973-1978
- Certificate 'A' 3-year (Post- Secondary) General 1979-1988
- Certificate 'A' 3-year (Post-Secondary) Science 1989-1992
- Certificate 'A' 3-year Post Secondary Science and Arts 1990-2003
- 2-year Modular Course for untrained teachers 1983-1989
- Diploma in Basic Education (Regular programme) 2004
- Diploma in Basic Education (Sandwich) 2005
- Certificate 'A' 4-year (Sandwich) 2006.

== New (Current) Programmes ==
Bachelor of Education Degree, 4-year Junior High School (Level Specialism Programme), 2018

- B.Ed. Information Communication Technology
- B.Ed. Mathematics
- B.Ed. Science
- B.Ed. Agriculture Science
- B.Ed. Visual Arts
- B.Ed. Home Economics
- B.Ed. Technical Vocational Skills

Bachelor of Education Degree, 4-year Primary School Education
