= Alluolue Festival =

Festival in Ghana by the Sefwi people

Alluolue (Yam, Eluo) Festival is a Ghanaian annual festival celebrated by the chiefs and people of Sefwi Wiawso and Sefwi Bekwai in the Western North region, formerly Western region of Ghana. It is usually celebrated in the month of July. Others also claim it is celebrated in November/December.

== Celebrations ==
During the festival, visitors are welcomed to share food and drinks. The people put on traditional clothes and there is durbar of chiefs. There is also dancing and drumming.

== Significance ==
This festival is celebrated to mark an event that took place in the past. The festival is claimed to bring together people for the planning of development and sew bonds of unity and friendship.
