= Ada College of Education =

Teacher training college in Ada Foah, Ghana

- Former name: Ada Teacher Training College
- Motto: Awareness, Curiosity and Compassion
- Established: 1965
- Affiliations: Government of Ghana
- Location: Ada-Foah, Ada East, GY0294, Ghana; 5.78044°N 0.62001°E
- Language: English
- Region Zone: Greater Accra; Eastern / Greater Accra
- Short name: AdaCo
- Source: An Atlas of The Forty Colleges of Education in Ghana.

Ada College of Education is a teacher education college in Ada-Foah (Ada East District, Greater Accra, Ghana). The college is located in Eastern / Greater Accra zone. It is one of the 46 Public Colleges of Education. The college participated in the DFID-funded T-TEL programme.

The college has its accreditation from the University of Cape Coast.

== Location ==
Ada College of Education is located at Ada Foah in the Greater Accra Region of Ghana.

== History ==
The Ada College of Education( AdaCoE) was previously called Ada Teacher Training College. It was founded by Dr. Kwame Nkrumah(first president of Ghana) in 1965.

The first batch of students numbered 24 with Mr. J.M.T. Dosoo after whom the college Library has been named serving as the first principal and was supported by Messrs J.N. Dzeagu, E.A.K. Kuworno, J.T. Antonio, and S.E.K. Loh. Mr. Aaron Kitcher who was the Regional Education Officer then and Lawyer Narter Olaga contributed immensely in the pioneering days of the college.The college officially admitted its first batch of students on 26th November 1965.

The first intake consisted of 24 students,the number later increased to 80.It started as an all-male institution and later to both gender.

In 1974, the college replaced teacher trainees and started admitting students for vocational and secondary courses.

There are four halls serving the residential needs of the students: these are Same Hall, Lorlorvor Hall, Songor Hall,and Okor Hall. The college has ICT facilities. A Library, Science block and had a lot of classroom blocks constructed.

== Education ==
The college started as a four-year post middle institution. Since then, it has gone through the following programmes:

- 2-year Modular course for untrained teachers from 1985 to 1991
- 3-year post secondary
- 3-year Diploma in Basic Education which started in 2004
- 2-year sandwich course for Certificate ‘A’ teachers for the award of Diploma in Basic Education.

The college has six departments and offers various programmes.

=== Departments ===
1. Vocational Skills
2. Languages
3. Science
4. Education Studies
5. Mathematics & ICT
6. Social Sciences
7. Computer Science

=== Programmes offered ===
- General Specialisation in Primary and Junior High School
- Early Childhood Education Studies
- Mathematics/Science
- French
- Technical & Vocational
- Visually and Hearing Challenged
