= Bia Lamplighter College of Education =

Coordinates: 6.651°N 3.093°W

- Sefwi Essam Debiso; Western Region, Ghana

Information
- Established: circa 2004
- Affiliation: University of Education, Winneba, Government of Ghana
- Website: blce.edu.gh

Bia Lamplighter College of Education is a co-educational college of education in Sefwi Debsio (Bia West District, Western Region, Ghana). The college is located in the Central / Western zone. It is one of 46 public colleges of education in Ghana and is affiliated to the University of Education, Winneba. The college participated in the DFID-funded T-TEL programme. Dr. Samuel Agyeman is currently the principal of the college.

== Education ==
421 students matriculated in 2019.

== History ==
Augustine Tawiah, MP for Bia West Constituency established Bia Lamplighter as a private school around 2004. The college was inaugurated in March 2019.
