= Likpe-Mate =

Coordinates: 7°11′N 0°36′E

- Interactive map of Likpe-Mate
- Country: Ghana
- Region: Oti Region

Likpe-Mate is one of the nine towns in the Likpe traditional area (one of the Guan-speaking ethnic groups in the Oti Region) in the Sall constituency of Oti Region of Ghana. Likpe-Mate houses the seat of the paramount chief of the Likpe community. The town is known for the Likpe Secondary School. The major language spoken by the people of Likpe-Mate is Sekpele. Other languages spoken in the community include Ewe, Twi, and French. The majority of the people in the community engage in farming.
