= List of polytechnics in Ghana =

Location of Ghana

This is a list of polytechnics institutions in Ghana. These institutions are not accredited degree granting institutions. For a list of Universities and other degree granting institutions see List of universities in Ghana.

== Public polytechnics & Select polytechnics ==
Institution	Location(s)	Website
Public polytechnics
Tamale Polytechnic	Tamale, Northern Region	Website
Kumasi Polytechnic	Kumasi, Ashanti Region	Website
Accra Polytechnic	Accra, Greater Accra Region	Website
Cape Coast Polytechnic	Cape Coast, Central Region	Website
Koforidua Polytechnic	Koforidua, Eastern Region	Website
Ho Polytechnic	Ho, Volta Region	Website
Takoradi Polytechnic	Takoradi, Western Region	Website
Sunyani Polytechnic	Sunyani, Brong Ahafo Region	Website
Bolgatanga Polytechnic	Bolgatanga, Upper East Region	Website
Wa Polytechnic	Wa, Upper West Region	Website
Select polytechnics
Archbishop Porter's Polytechnic	Cape Coast, Central Region	—

== See also ==
- List of universities in Ghana
