= Peki College of Education =

Teacher Training College in Ghana

- Affiliations: Government of Ghana
- Location: Peki, South Dayi District, VE1103, Ghana; 6.51585°N 0.21549°E
- Language: English
- Region Zone: Volta Region; Volta Zone
- Short name: Govco
- Source: An Atlas of The Forty Colleges of Education in Ghana.

Peki College of Education is a teacher education college in Peki (South Dayi District, Volta Region, Ghana). The college is located in Volta Zone along Accra to Hohoe highway. It is one of the about 40 public colleges of education in Ghana. The college participated in the DFID-funded T-TEL programme.

As of May 2019, the college is affiliated to the University of Ghana.

== History ==
Peki College of Education, formerly known as Government Training College, GOVCO, Peki was established on the 12TH of February,1954 with 30 men. It remained a male institution until 1961 when 25 women were admitted. The first principal of the college was Mr. A.F. Neale. The motto of the college is ‘NIHIL SINNE LABORE’. which translates "success Comes by Hard Work"

The college started with a 2-year Certificate ‘A’ Post ‘B’ programme, and has gone through the following programmes since then: 2-year Certificate ‘A’ Post Secondary; 2-year Art Education and Geography Specialist programme; 3-year Certificate ‘A’ Post Secondary course, 4-year Certificate ‘A’ Post Middle; 2-year Modular programme for untrained teachers for a 2-year Post Modular Certificate ‘A’ course, and the following Diploma in Basic Education programmes, 3-year Post Secondary (Regular); 4-year Untrained Teachers; 2-year Post ‘A’ sandwich that were introduced in 2004, 2005, and 2006 respectively as well as a 4-year Certificate ‘A’ programme for untrained teachers.

Around 1995, the College fell on academic evil days and performed poorly in external examinations. Determined to change the status quo, the principal and staff put their shoulders to the wheel and worked tirelessly till the College scored 100% in 1998. Since then, the college has maintained an enviable academic standard and has placed herself firmly on an enviable pedestal among her peers.

List of principals since established:
Name	Years served
Mr. A. F. Neale	1954 - 55
Mr. D. G. Pitchford	1956 - 1959
H. A. Macwilliam	1959 - 1960
P. K. Owusu	1960 – 1961
G. F. Brown	1961 – 1962
J. L. Annang	1962 – 1964
A. F. Menka	1964 – 1967
R. K. A. Ata	1967 – 1969
G. K. K. Borccoh	1970 – 1978
M. K. Hamenu	1979 – 1979
J. M. Y. Agbenu	1979 – 1980
D. K. M. Fiafor	1981- 1982
S. G. K. Amankwa	1982 – 1991
E. K. Atieku	1991 – 1992
Mrs. J. M. K. Aidam	1992 – 1997
Mr. S. W. K. Tsadidey	1997 - 2007
J.N.M. Baako	2008-2017
S.K. Tettey (Rev).	2017-2019
E.A. Bonney	2020 - Date
