= Wli waterfalls =

Waterfall in Ghana

Wli
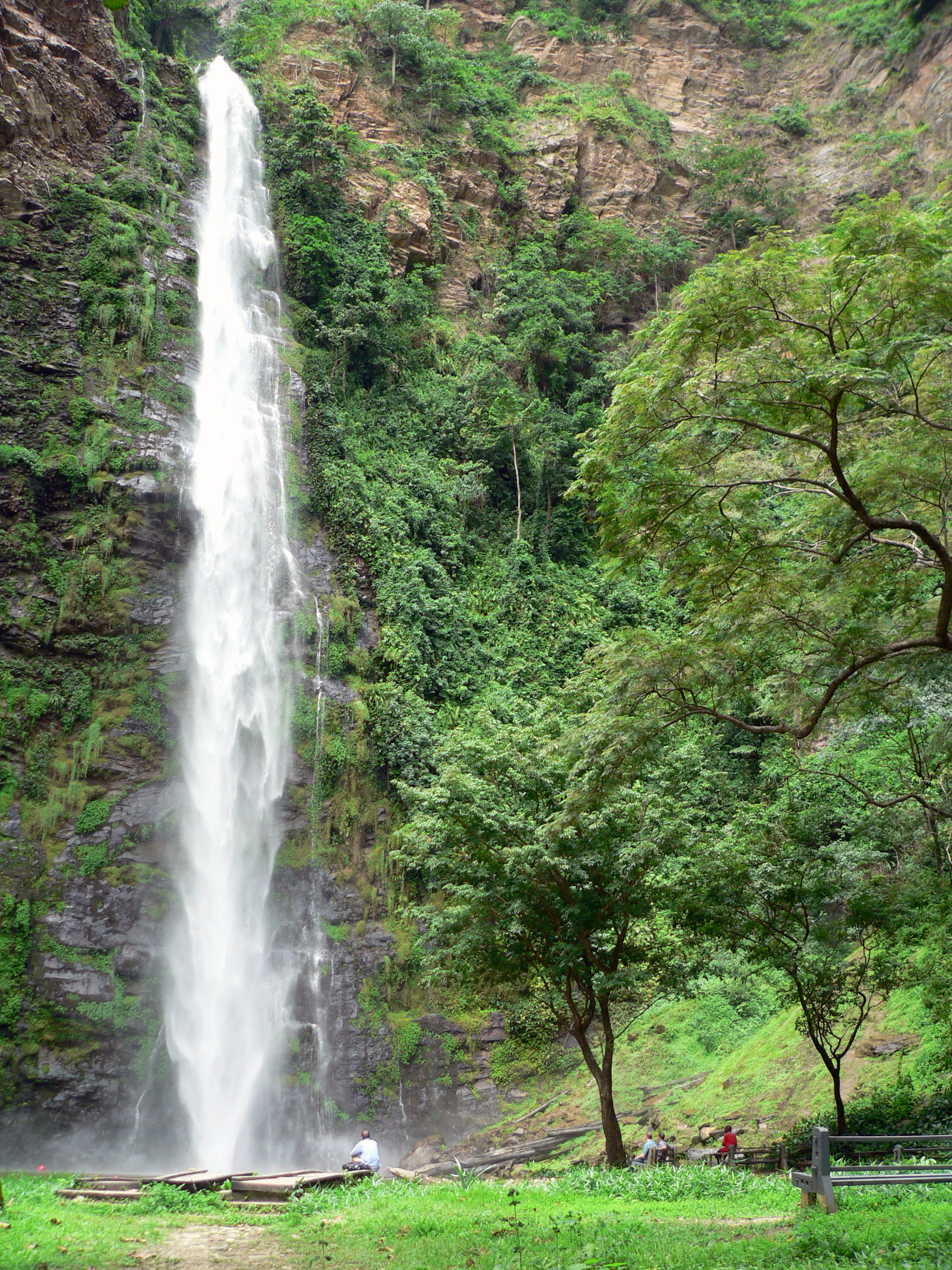
- Wli Lower Fall
- Location: Hohoe, Volta Region, Ghana
- Type: Chute
- Total height: 80 m (260 ft)

Wli Waterfalls is the highest waterfall in Ghana and the tallest in West Africa. It has a lower and an upper fall.

== Location ==
Wli Waterfalls is located 20 km from Hohoe in the Volta Region of Ghana.

Geography:

Wli Waterfalls consist of two main cascades: the upper fall, which drops approximately 80 metres, and the lower fall, with a Gedrop of about 65 metres. The falls are formed by the Agumatsa River, which flows over a cliff face composed of sandstone and shale formations belonging to the Akwapim‑Togo mountain range. The river's flow is seasonal, with peak water volume occurring during the rainy season from May to October, while the dry season (November to March) offers clearer water and easier access.

== Natural environment ==
=== Wildlife ===
A walk through the forest of the Agumatsa wildlife sanctuary offers a chance to see a large colony of fruit bats, butterflies, birds, monkeys and baboons.

=== Bats ===
A large colony of bats can be seen clinging to the cliffs and flying in the sky.

== History ==
The Wli waterfalls is the highest water fall in West Africa located in Ghana The falls is known locally as Agoomatsa waterfalls - meaning, "Allow Me to Flow." It is located in the Hohoe municipality of the Volta Region, the land of the Ewe culture. It is approximately 280 kilometers from the capital Accra. It was found by a group of hunters who presumed the sound of the falls was a talking drum sounding and ran towards the noise only to find that it was a waterfall.

== Gallery ==
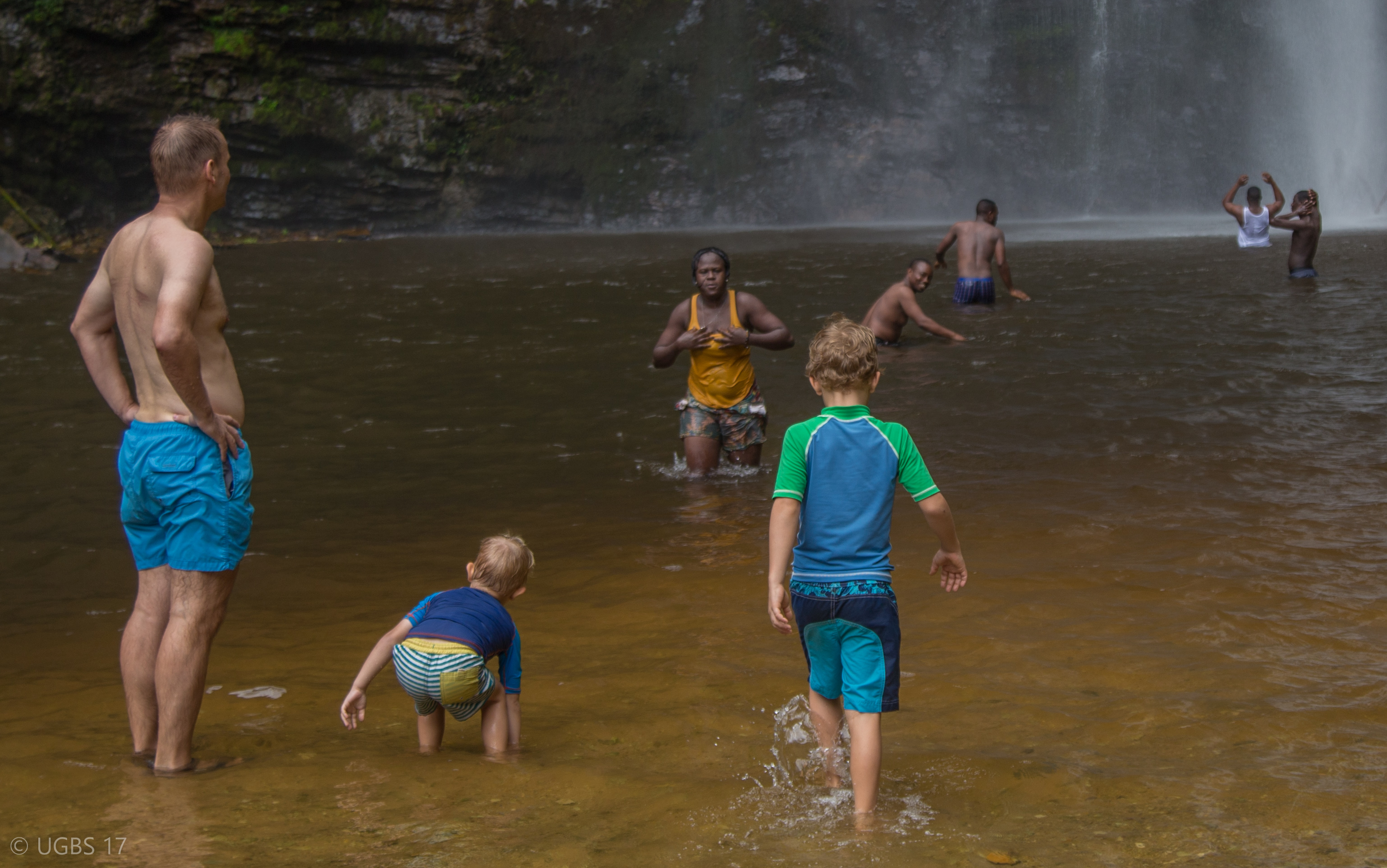
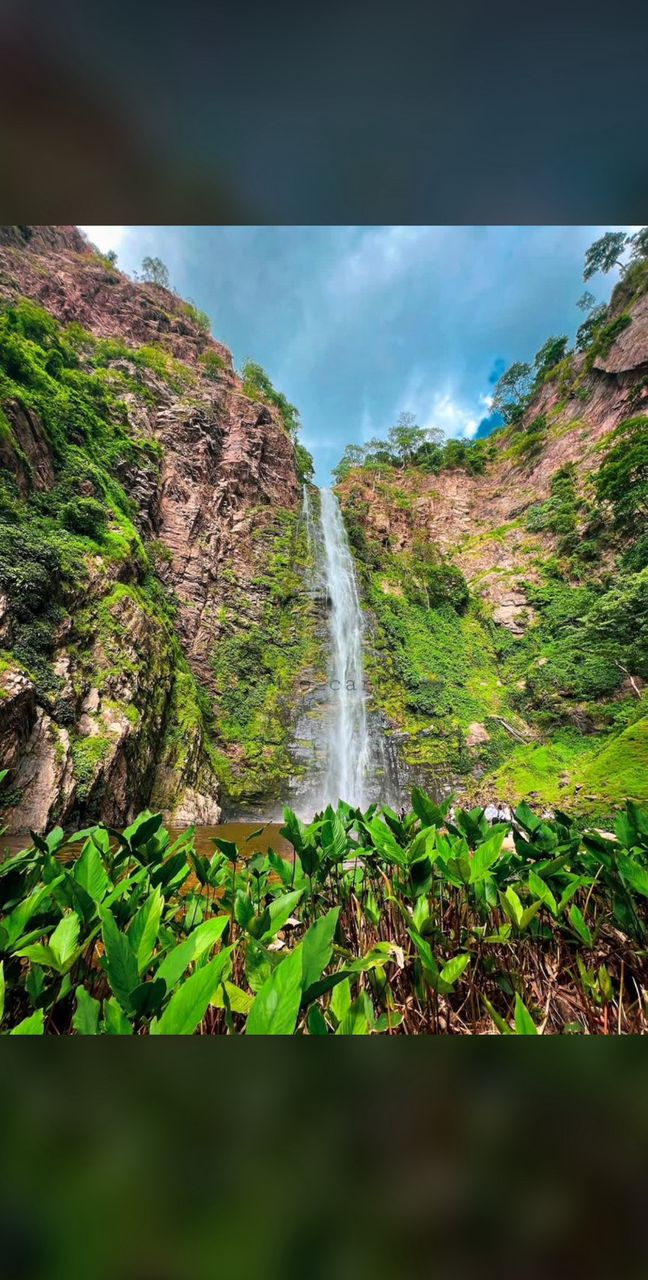
picture of the wli waterfalls
The falls attracts tourists from all over the world

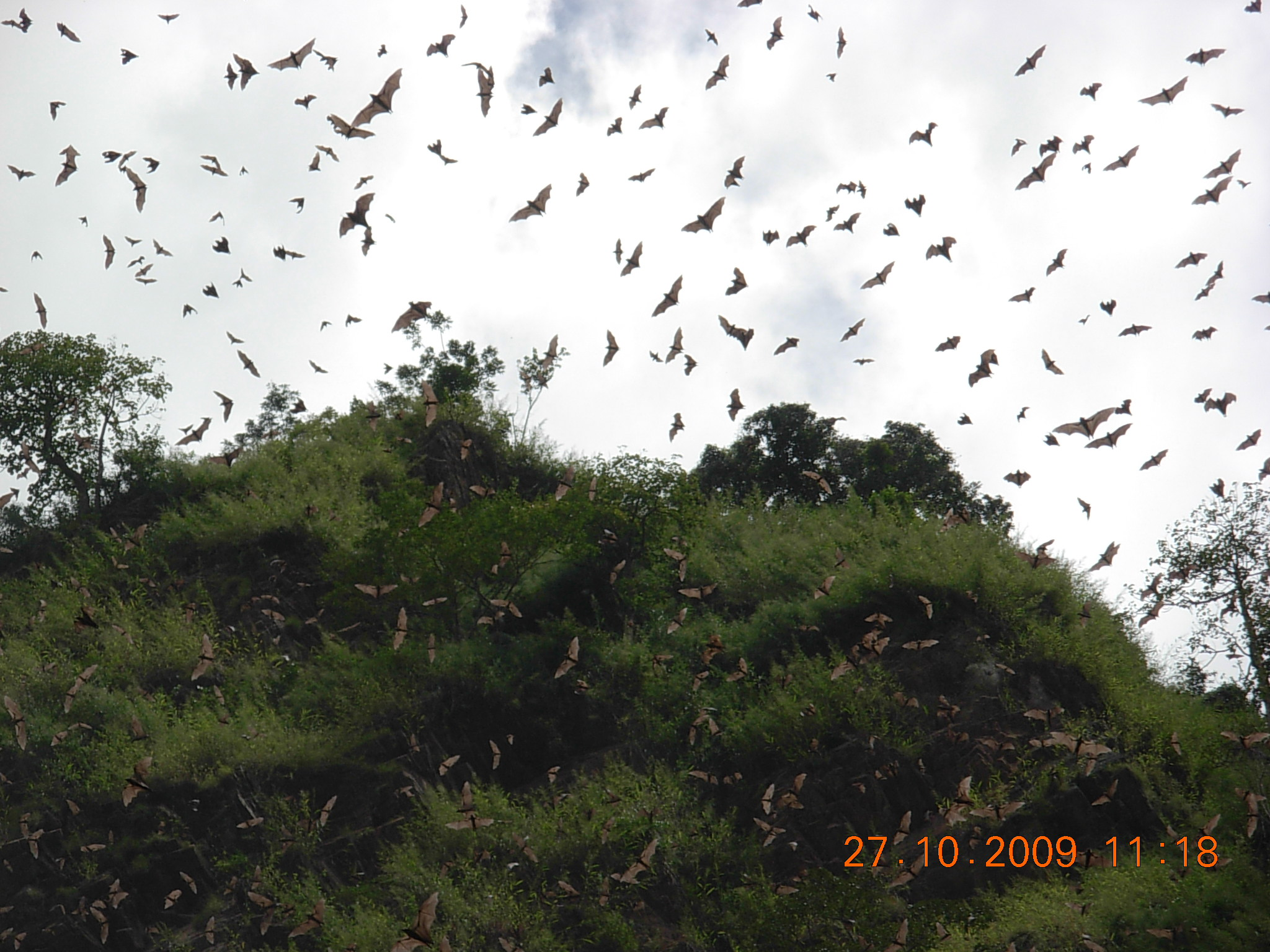
The Agumatsa wildlife sanctuary offers a chance to see a large colony of wild fruit bats

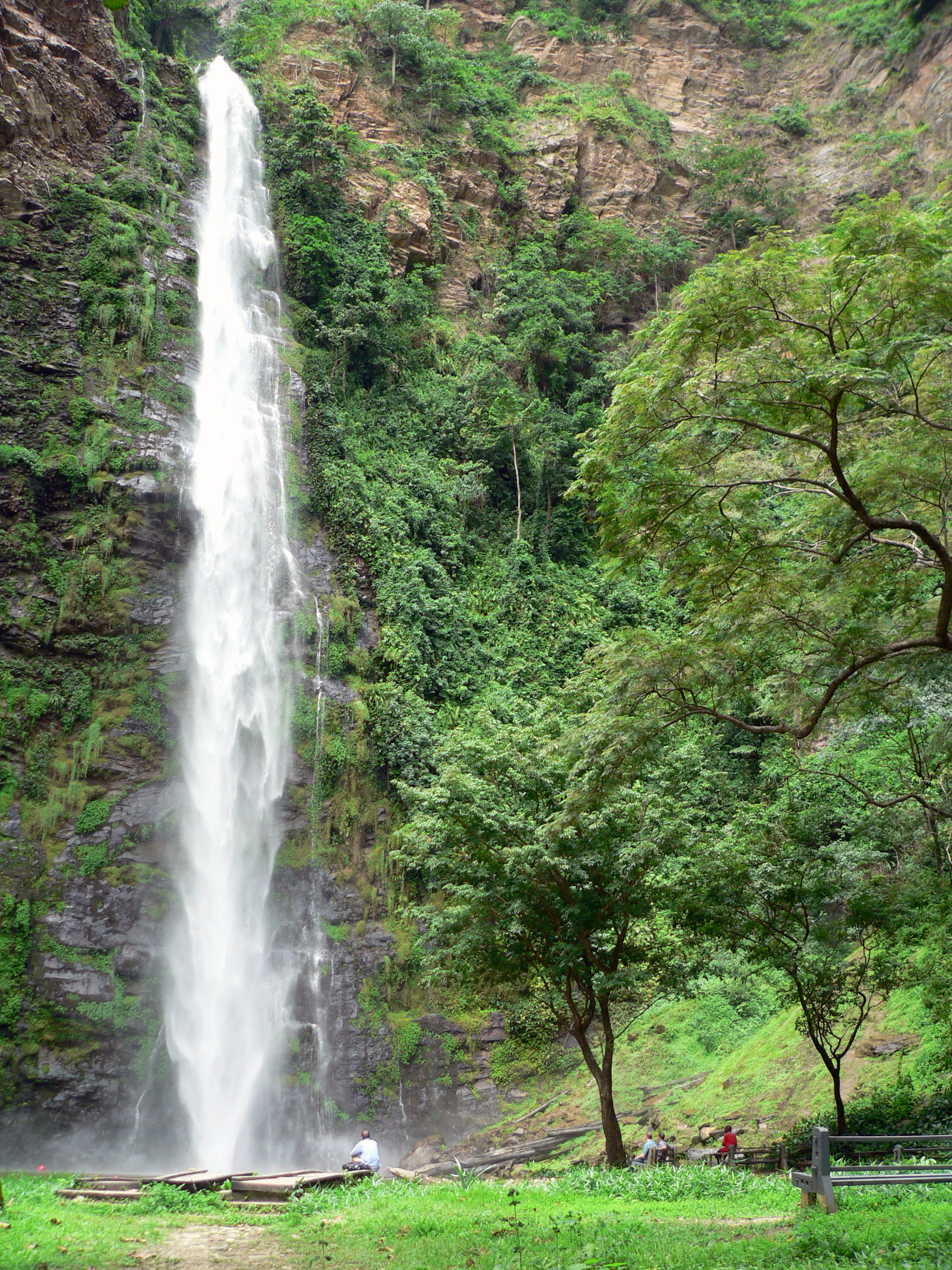
Lower waterfall

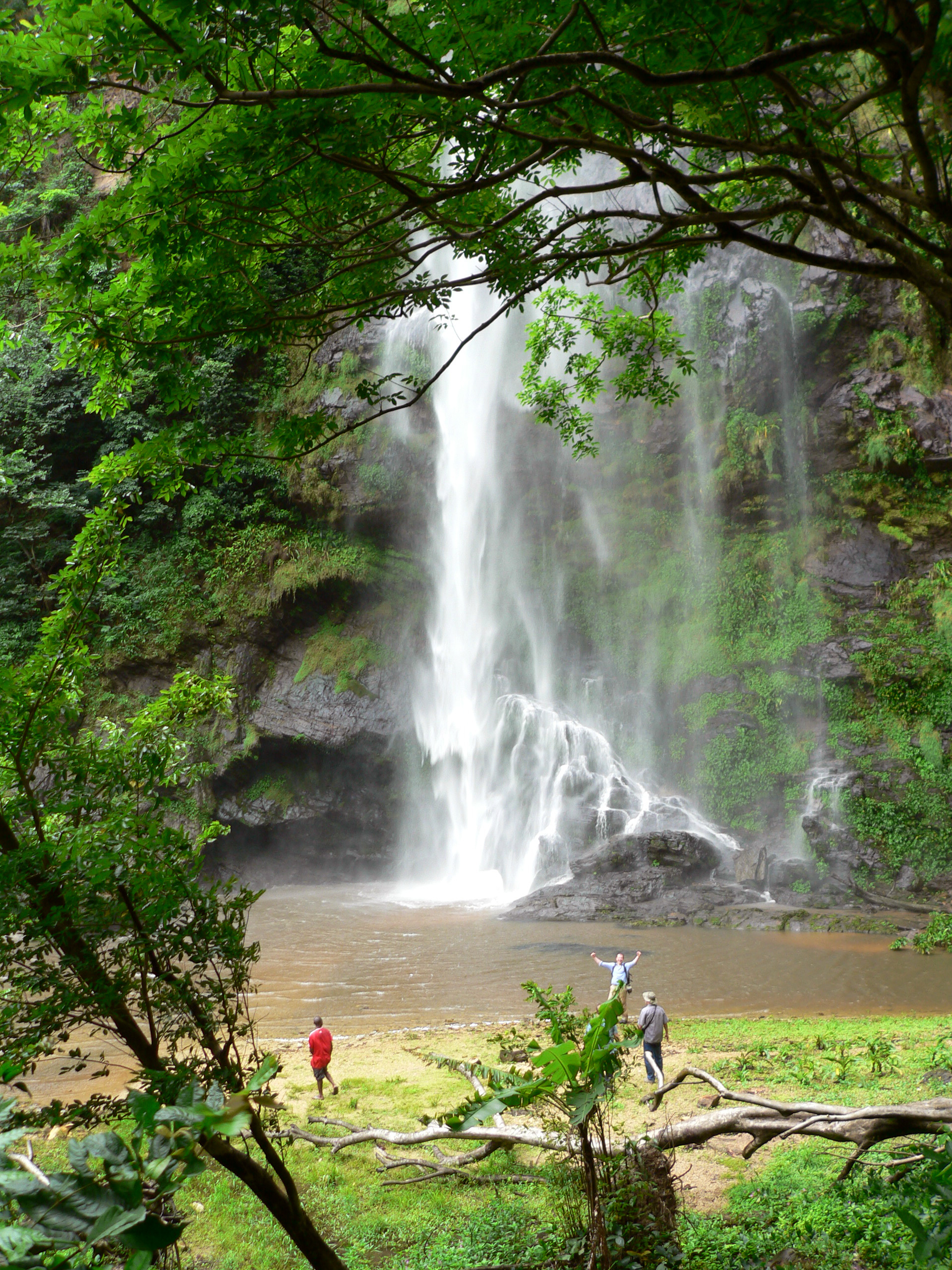
Upper waterfall

== See also ==
- List of waterfalls
