= St. Ambrose College of Education =

Teachers Training College in Dormaa, Ghana

- St. Ambrose
- Affiliations: Government of Ghana
- Location: Dormaa Akwamu, Dormaa East District, BE0255, Ghana; 7.30736°N 2.73869°W
- Language: English
- Region Zone: Brong-Ahafo; Ashanti / Brong Ahafo
- Short name: SACE
- Source: An Atlas of The Forty Colleges of Education in Ghana.

St. Ambrose College of Education is a teacher education college in Dormaa Akwamu (Dormaa East District, Brong Ahafo Region, Ghana). The college is located in Ashanti / Brong Ahafo zone. It is one of the about 40 public colleges of education in Ghana. The college participated in the DFID-funded T-TEL programme. It was established in November 2009 by the Catholic Diocese of Sunyani and officially commissioned in January 2011. In the 2016–2017 academic year it became a Public College of Education. It is affiliated to the University of Cape Coast. The idea of establishing a College of Education at Dormaa Akwamu was muted by the Dormaa Akwamuhene, Barima Oppong Kyeremeh Sikafo (a.k.a. Nana Kojo Danso-Mensah), a former Deputy Registrar in charge of Administration of the University of Cape Coast. He pursued this dream by imploring the Catholic Archdiocese of Sunyani to make it a reality which culminated in the establishment of St. Ambrose College of Education at Dormaa Akwamu.
