= Berekum College of Education =

Teacher training college in Berekum, Ghana

- Established: February 1953
- Affiliations: Government of Ghana
- Location: Berekum, Berekum Municipal District, BB0023, Ghana; 7.44510°N 2.57545°W
- Language: English
- Region Zone: Brong-Ahafo; Ashanti / Brong Ahafo
- Short name: Betco
- Source: An Atlas of The Forty Colleges of Education in Ghana

Berekum College of Education is a teacher education college in Berekum (Berekum Municipal District, Brong-Ahafo Region, Ghana). The college is located in Ashanti / Brong Ahafo zone. It is one of the about 40 public colleges of education in Ghana. The college participated in the DFID-funded T-TEL programme.

== History ==
Berekum College of Education is located in the south-eastern part of Berekum, on the Berekum-Sunyani road. The college was established in February 1953 as a Government institution, with the motto PER ARDUA AD ASTRA (Through Adversity to the Stars). Nana Yiadom Boakye Owusu II, the then Omanhene of Berekum traditional area, released 42 hectares (103.491 acres) of land and laid the foundation stone for the establishment of the college. In February 1953, sixty male students were enrolled. Mr. T.T. Buchanan was the College's first principal. Mr. Alex Godwin Kwakye was the first college prefect. Three dormitories were built and named after the first three principals – Buchanan House, Nicholas House, and Stewart House. Mr. I. E. Hayfron was the first Ghanaian principals of the college.

The college took off with a two-year certificate ‘B’ programme till 1961 when a four-year Certificate ‘A’ programme was introduced. The last batch of the two-year Certificate ‘B’ students left in 1963. In 1964, a two-year Specialist programme in Mathematics was also introduced. The programme was transferred to Winneba in 1966. The college became a co-educational institution when women were admitted in 1965. In 1968, a two-year Post-Secondary Certificate ‘A’ course was introduced to run alongside the four-year Certificate ‘A’ course which phased out in 1971. Berekum Girls Secondary school was established in 1972, and attached to the college, which became a female institution. Men were re-admitted into the college in 1974 which rendered the Girls Secondary School removed in 1975. In that year, a three-year Post-Secondary programme was introduced to run alongside the four-year Post Middle programme that was re-introduced in 1975. A Modular programme for uncertificated teachers was introduced in 1984. The Post Middle programme was finally phased out in 1992.

The vision of the college is An icon of excellence in teacher education. In September 2007 the college was given accreditation to offer Diploma programme. However, the first batch of Diploma graduates passed out in July 2007. Student enrolment as at October 2007 stood at 916, comprising 613 men and 303 women. The college runs a Sandwich programme in Diploma in Basic Education for 546 certificate ‘A’ teachers, and 586 untrained teachers. Two hundred and thirty-one (231) untrained teachers are also on a sandwich programme for certificate ‘A’. There are 43 teaching staff members, comprising 36 men and 7 women. The college has seen an impressive academic record over the years and has trained about eight thousand teachers, a good number of whom have served or are serving in other capacities as public servants, lawyers, accountants, lecturers, politicians, business executives, traditional rulers and media practitioners.

The college has a proud record in sports, for instance, in 1963, the college played the Government Secondary Technical School at Achimota School in the finals for the Presidential Trophy. The college emerged as the first runner-up. In 2007, the college emerged the overall champion in the Ashanti/Brong-Ahafo (ASHBA) Sports Competition. In 2008, it became the first runner-up in the ASHBA Sports Competition.

Berekum College places emphasis on discipline, maintenance of plants and structures, and environmental cleanliness. Most of the infrastructural facilities were built in the 1950s. Some extension works were undertaken in the 1970s. The Government of Ghana with assistance from Kreditantstallt FÜr Wiederaufbau (KfW) completed some major rehabilitation and constructional works in the college in July 2000. Within the same period, the Managing Director of Asuo Bomosadu Timbers and Sawmills (ABTS) in Berekum donated a 7,000-gallon-capacity water reservoir to the college to solve the acute water problem. Under the GETFund, the college has been provided with a modern one-storey Library Complex as well as a 12-unit Classroom Block.

The list of principals of the college since its inception include:
Name	Years served
Mr. J.R.T. Nicholas	February 1955 – October 1957
Mr. I.M. Stewart	October 1957 – August 1958
Mr. I.E. Hayfron	August 1958 – March 1961
Mr. H.C. Essilfie (Ag.)	March 1961 – September 1961
Mr. G.Y. Agyeman	September 1961 – June 1962
Mr. A.K.A Tinkorang	June 1962 – September 1963
Mr. E. Asiedu-Akrofi	September 1963 – September 1965
Mr. C.K.A.A. Quarshie (Ag.)	September 1965 – December 1965
Mr. A.I. Krampa	December 1965 – August 1968
Mr. I.K. Adjei	August 1968 - October 1970
Mr. A.G. Essilfie	December 1970 – January 1974
Ms. Margaret Amakye (Ag.)	January 1974 – September 1974
Mr. L.H. Osei Baffour	September 1974 – October 1978
Mr. V.P.K. Ametefe	February 1979 – September 1980
Mr. M.M. Tettey	September 1980 – September 1982
Mr. J.K. Tuah	September 1982 – January 1997
Mr. Tom Coffie	January 1997 – November 1997
Mr. Yaw Adjei-Sarkodie	November 1997
