= Hohoe Municipal District =

- Municipal District
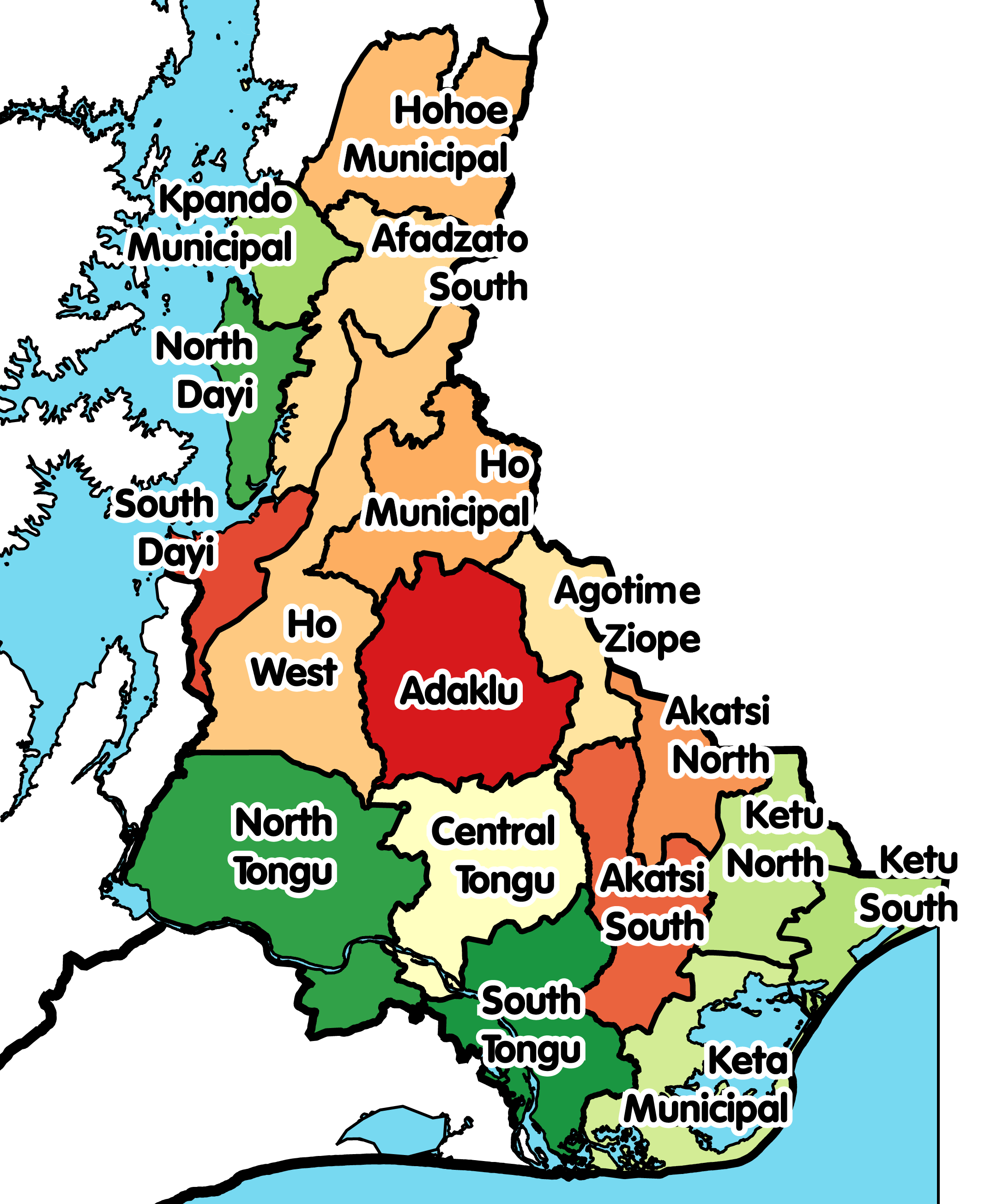
- Districts of Volta Region

- Location of Hohoe Municipal District within Volta
- Coordinates: 7°9′9″N 0°28′36″E
- Country: Ghana
- Region: Volta
- Capital: Hohoe

Government
  - Municipal Chief Executive: Francis Fiakpui

Area
  - Total: 357.8 km^{2} (138.1 sq mi)

Population (2021)
  - Total: 114,472
  - Density: 319.9/km^{2} (828.6/sq mi)
- Time zone: UTC+0 (GMT)
- ISO 3166 code: GH-TV-HH

Hohoe Municipal District is one of the eighteen districts in Volta Region, Ghana. Originally created as a district assembly in 1988 when it was known as Hohoe District, it was elevated to municipal district assembly status on 29 February 2008 to become Hohoe Municipal District. On 28 June 2012, the southern part of the district was split off to create Afadzato South District, while the remaining part was retained as Hohoe Municipal District. However, on 8 October 2021, the northern part of the district was split off to create Guan District, which moved to Oti Region, while the remaining part was retained as Hohoe Municipal District, thus staying within Volta Region. The municipality is located in the northern part of the Volta Region and has Hohoe as its capital town.

== List of Settlements ==
Settlements of Hohoe Municipal District
No.	Settlement	Population	Population year
1.	Hohoe	144,511	2000
2.	Hohoe	167,016	2010
3.	Hohoe	114,472	2021

== Sources ==
- "Districts of Ghana". Statoids.
- Hohoe Municipal on GhanaDistricts.com
