= Hohoe =

Town in Volta Region, Ghana

Hohoe Hohoé
- Town & District Capital
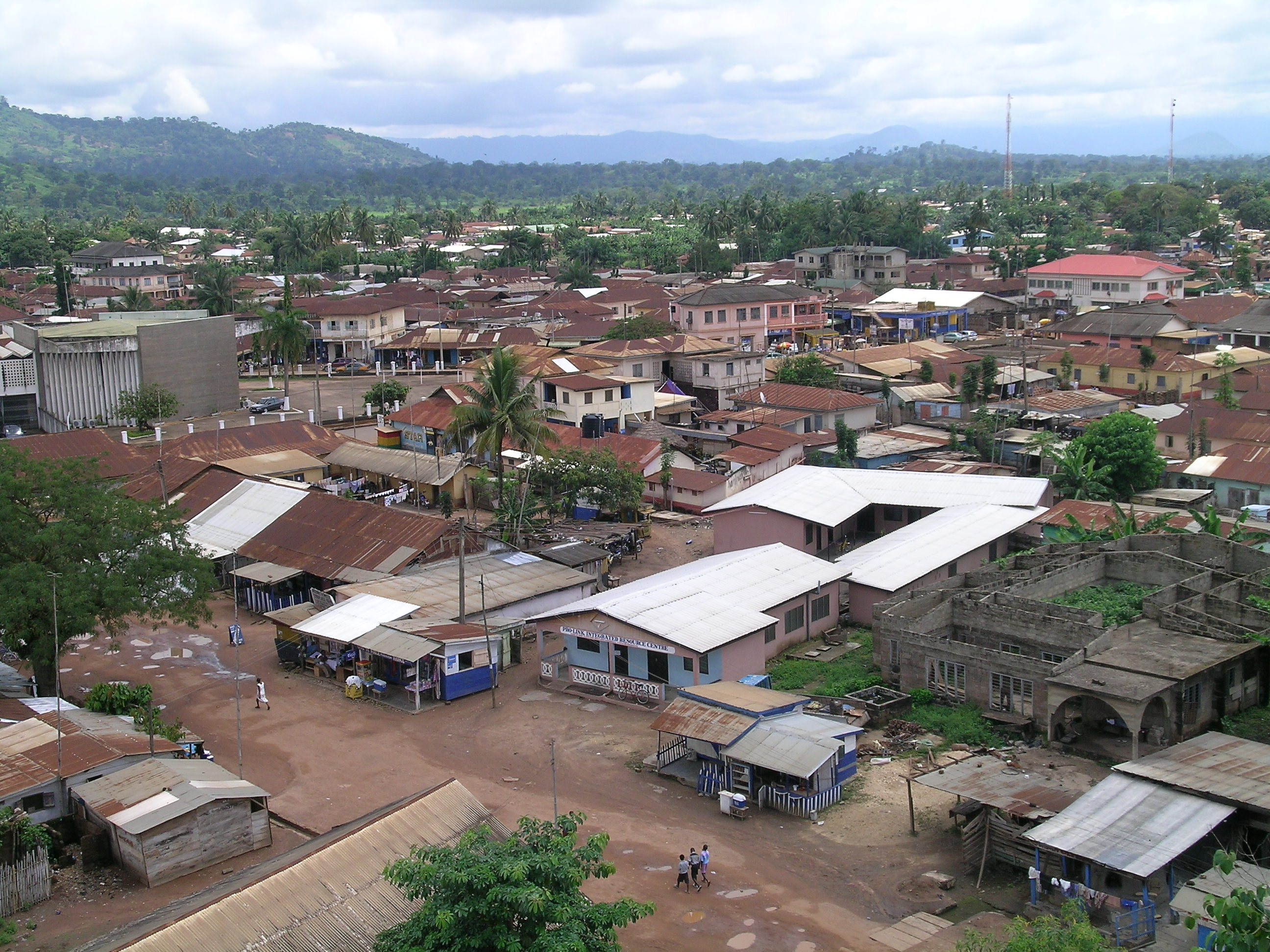
- Hohoe city center

- Location in Ghana
- Coordinates: 7°9′9″N 0°28′36″E
- Country: Ghana
- Region: Volta Region
- District: Hohoe Municipal District
- Elevation: 163 m (535 ft)

Population (2012)
  - Total: 56,202
- Ranked 35th in Ghana
- Time zone: GMT
  - Summer (DST): GMT

Hohoe is a town and the district capital of Hohoe Municipality located in the Volta Region of Ghana. It is about 78 km (48 mi) from Ho, the regional capital and 220 km (140 mi) from Accra, the national capital. The population of Hohoe Municipality, according to the 2010 Population and Housing Census, is 167,016 representing 7.9 per cent of the total population of the Volta Region. It comprises 52.1 per cent females and 47.9 percent males.

== Major areas ==
Alavanyo-Dzogbedze, Alavanyo-Deme, Alavanyo Agorme, Alavanyo-Kpeme, Alavanyo-Wudidi, Alavanyo-Agorxoe, Alavanyo-Abehenase, Gbi-Bla, Gbi-Kpeme, Gbi-Godenu Gbi-Abansi, Gbi-Wegbe, Kpoeta, Gbi-Atabu, Gbi-Kledzo, Gborxome, Blave, Kitikpa, Lowcost, Segbedeme, Ahado, Fodome, Tsevi, Wli, Paloma, Adabraka, Bangalow, Boondocks, Torkorni,Trevi.

== Education ==
There are many private and public basic schools in Hohoe. A list of educational institutions in Hohoe are as follows:

=== Tertiary institutions ===
- University of Health and Allied Sciences
- St. Theresa's Training College
- St. Francis College of Education
- Hohoe Midwifery Training College

=== Secondary education ===
- Hohoe EP Senior High School.
- Likpe Senior High School
- Alavanyo Senior High Technical School
- Akpafu Senior High Technical School
- Agate Senior High School
- Afadjato Senior High Technical School
- St. Mary's Seminary/Senior High School

== Tourism ==
The Hohoe Municipality is a home of tourism potential capable of transforming its economy, as well as its overall contribution to national income when fully harnessed. It has beautiful landscapes, numerous eco-tourism sites that make it one of the most important tourist areas in the country. The Hohoe Municipality has the following marked tourism features:

- The highest peak in Ghana Mount Afadja (Afadjato) located between Liati Wote and Gbledi communities
- The highest waterfall in West Africa – Wli Waterfall located at Wli.
- Tsatsadu Waterfall located at Alavanyo
- Tagbo Waterfall at Liati Wote
- Wadjakli Waterfall located at Likpe Todome
- The most wonderful ancient old iron mines at Akpafu Todzi .
- The four ancestral caves located at Likpe-Todome.

== Notable natives ==
- V. Kofi Agawu
- Millicent Ankude
