= List of hospitals in the Volta Region =

The following is a list of hospitals in the Volta Region of Ghana as well as Health Centres.

The Volta Region has a population of 1,955.371. The population density is 87 square kilometres with 30% of the population living in urban areas. It is divided into 18 administrative districts with Ho as the regional capital. There are a total of 2,752 communities in the region.

The region has a Regional Health Directorate which has oversight for the health facilities in the region. Under this are 18 municipal and district health directorates and a total of 84 health sub-districts.

== Districts ==
=== Adaklu District ===
- Adaklu Waya Health Centre, Adaklu Waya
- Hasu Community Polyclinic, Hasu

=== Agotime-Ziope District ===
- Agotime Kpetoe Clinic, Kpetoe

=== Akatsi South District ===
- Akatsi District Hospital, Akatsi
- Hoggar Clinic Ltd, Akatsi
- St. Paul's Hospital, Akatsi

=== Anloga District ===
- International Health and Development Network (IHDN) Mission Hospital, Agbozume

=== Central Tongu District ===
- Adidome Hospital, Adidome
- Mafi-Kumase Health Center, Mafi-Kumasi

=== Ho Municipal District ===
- Foresight Medical Centre, Ho
- Ho Municipal Hospital, Ho
- Ho Royal Hospital, Ho
- Ho Teaching Hospital, Ho (Regional Hospital and Teaching Hospital with the University of Health and Allied Sciences).

=== Ho West District ===
- Akrofu Xeviwofe Health Centre, Akrofu
- Abutia Health Center, Abutia
- Hlefi Health center, Hlefi
- Kpedze Hospital, Kpedze
- Nazareth Hospital, Vane
- St. Francis Catholic Hospital
- Tsito Health Centre, Tsito
- Anyirawase Health Center, Anyirawase

=== Hohoe Municipal District ===
- Cedar Medical Centre, Hohoe
- Cedarville Hospital, Hohoe
- Hohoe Municipal Hospital, Hohoe

=== Keta Municipal District ===
- Keta District Hospital, Keta
- Sacred Heart Hospital, Abor
- Wellspan Health, Abor

=== Ketu North Municipal District ===
- Ketu North Municipal Hospital, Weta
- Saint Anthony's Hospital, Dzodze

=== Ketu South Municipal District ===
- Central Aflao Hospital, Aflao
- Ketu South Municipal Hospital, Aflao
- King's Hand Hospital Tokor, Denu
- New Hope Clinic, Viepe, Aflao

=== Kpando Municipal District ===
- Margaret Marquart Catholic Hospital, Kpando
- St. Patrick Hospital, Kpando

=== North Dayi District ===
- Anfoega Catholic Hospital, Anfoega

=== North Tongu District ===
- Adidome Government Hospital, Adidome
- Catholic Hospital, Battor
- Evangelical Presbyterian Church Hospital, Adidome

=== South Dayi District ===
- Adzokoe Health Centre
- Dzemeni E. P. Clinic
- Kpalime Duga Health Centre
- Peki Dzake Health Centre, Peki
- Peki Government Hospital, Peki
- Salem Maternity Home
- Tongor Tsanekpe Health Centre
- Tsate Community-Based Health Planning and Services (CHPS) Zone
- Tsiyinu CHPS Zone
- Wegbe Kpalime Health Centre

=== South Tongu District ===
- Government Hospital, Sogakope
- Richard Novati Catholic Hospital, Sogakope

== See also ==
- Healthcare in Ghana
- List of hospitals in Ghana
- National Health Insurance Scheme (Ghana)
