= Adaklu-Anyigbe District =

- Former District
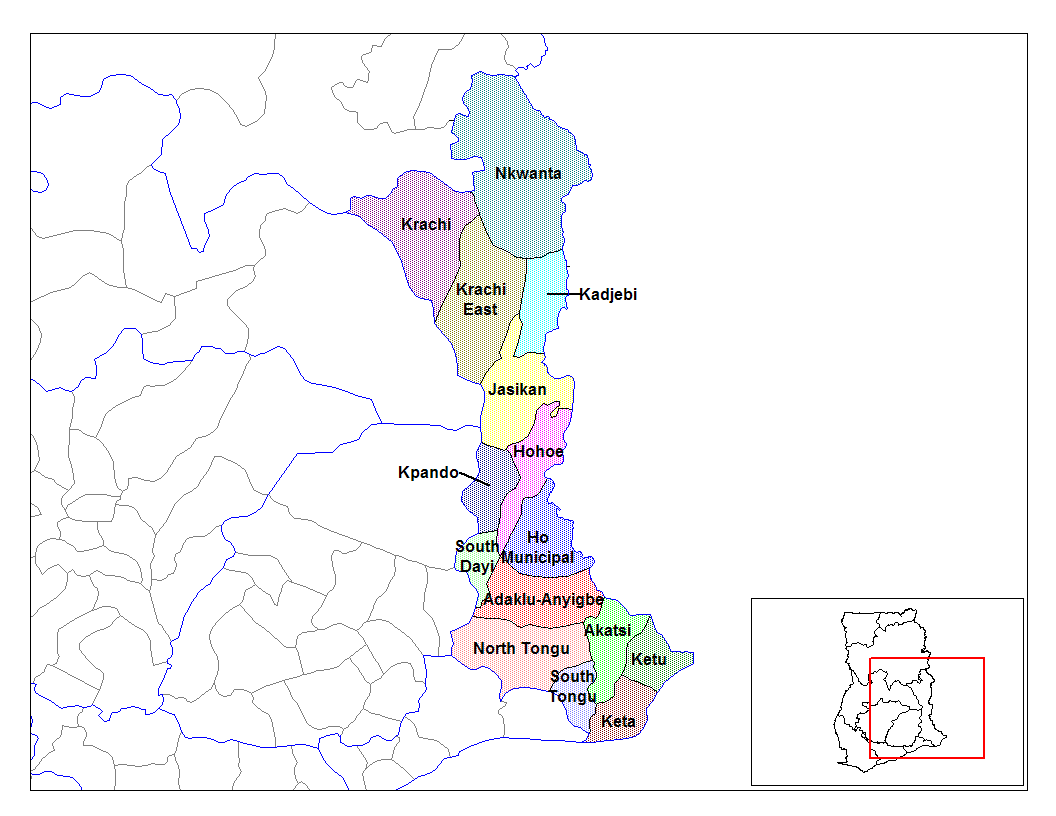
- Districts of Volta Region

- Location of Adaklu-Anyigbe District within Volta
- Coordinates: 6°32′59.28″N 0°41′42.36″E
- Country: Ghana
- Region: Volta
- Capital: Agortime-Kpetoe

Area
  - Total: 1,060.61 km^{2} (409.50 sq mi)
- Time zone: UTC+0 (GMT)
- ISO 3166 code: GH-TV-AA

Adaklu-Anyigbe District is a former district that was located in Volta Region, Ghana. Originally it was formerly part of the then-larger Ho District on 10 March 1989, until the southern part was split off to create Adaklu-Anyigbe District on 13 August 2004; thus the remaining part has been retained as Ho Municipal District. However, on 28 June 2012, it was split off into two new districts: Agotime-Ziope District (capital: Agortime-Kpetoe) and Adaklu District (capital: Adaklu Waya). The district assembly was located in the central part of Volta Region and had Agortime-Kpetoe as its capital town.

== Location and geography ==
=== Location ===
Adaklu-Anyigbe District was bordered on the north by the Ho Municipal District from which it was created. In the south, it was bordered by the North Tongu District and the Akatsi District, while its eastern neighbour was the Republic of Togo.

== Villages ==
In addition to Agortime-Kpetoe, the capital town and administrative centre, Adaklu-Anyigbe District contained the following villages:

- Abuadi
- Adaklu
- Adaklu Ablornu
- Adaklu Anfoe
- Adaklu Helekpe
- Adaklu Ahunda-Kpodzi
- Adaklu Hlihave
- Adaklu Torda
- Adaklu Tsriefe
- Adaklu Waya
- Adjonko
- Agortime Afegame
- Agortime-Kpetoe
- Ahunta
- Helekpe
- Kodzobi
- Kordiabe
- Kpetsu
- Tsrate
- Waga
- Waya
- Ziofe

== Sources ==
- Districts of Ghana on Statoids.com
- Agortime-Kpetoe on GhanaDistricts.com
