= Adidome Senior High School =

Public school in Volta Region, Ghana

Coordinates: 6.094°N 0.506°E

Adidome Senior High School is a mixed public high school located in Adidome, Central Tongu, in the Volta region of Ghana. As of 2022, the school had a student population of about 2340, with 113 teachers and 52 non-teaching staff. The school functions as a central hub for science education within the Central Tongu District. Since 2008, it has embraced inclusive education, successfully integrating visually impaired students alongside their sighted peers.

== History ==
The school was founded on October 1, 1985, by a group of former Adidome E. P. Schools pupils, led by the late Rev. E. K. Titiati, with 57 students and 7 teachers. Initially called Mafi Community Day Secondary School, it was located at the former Rockshell Work Camp near the Adidome-Sogakope Junction. The first headmaster, Mr. H. A. K. Nyikplorkpo, relocated the school to an abandoned State Farms Corporation building opposite the Adidome District Assembly.

Mr. Johnie Kulego, a Mafi native in Sweden, provided funding to convert the building into classrooms and offices. The school was registered as a private secondary school on August 7, 1987, and received Certificate “B” from the Ghana Education Service (GES). After a GES inspection in 1989, it was partially absorbed into the public system and became fully government-assisted in January 1991.

In the 2005/2006 academic year, the school's name was changed to Adidome Secondary School to reflect its location. It was also upgraded to Model School status, leading to expanded facilities, increased student enrollment, and more staff.

== Headmasters ==
Name	Tenure of Office
Mr H. A. K. Nyikplorkpo	

== Courses offered ==
- General Science
- Visual Arts
- Agriculture Science
- General Arts
- Home Economics
- Business

== Achievements ==
- Adisec won the best in sports in 2016/2017.
- Adisec was first in the National Science and Maths Quiz competition ( Regional Level).

== Notable alumni ==
- Mac Sarbah - Social Entrepreneur and Innovator, Diversity, Equity, and Inclusion (DEI) Leader within the Global Health Office of the President at the Bill and Melinda Gates Foundation.
