= North Tongu District =

North Tongu District Tongu-Nord
- District
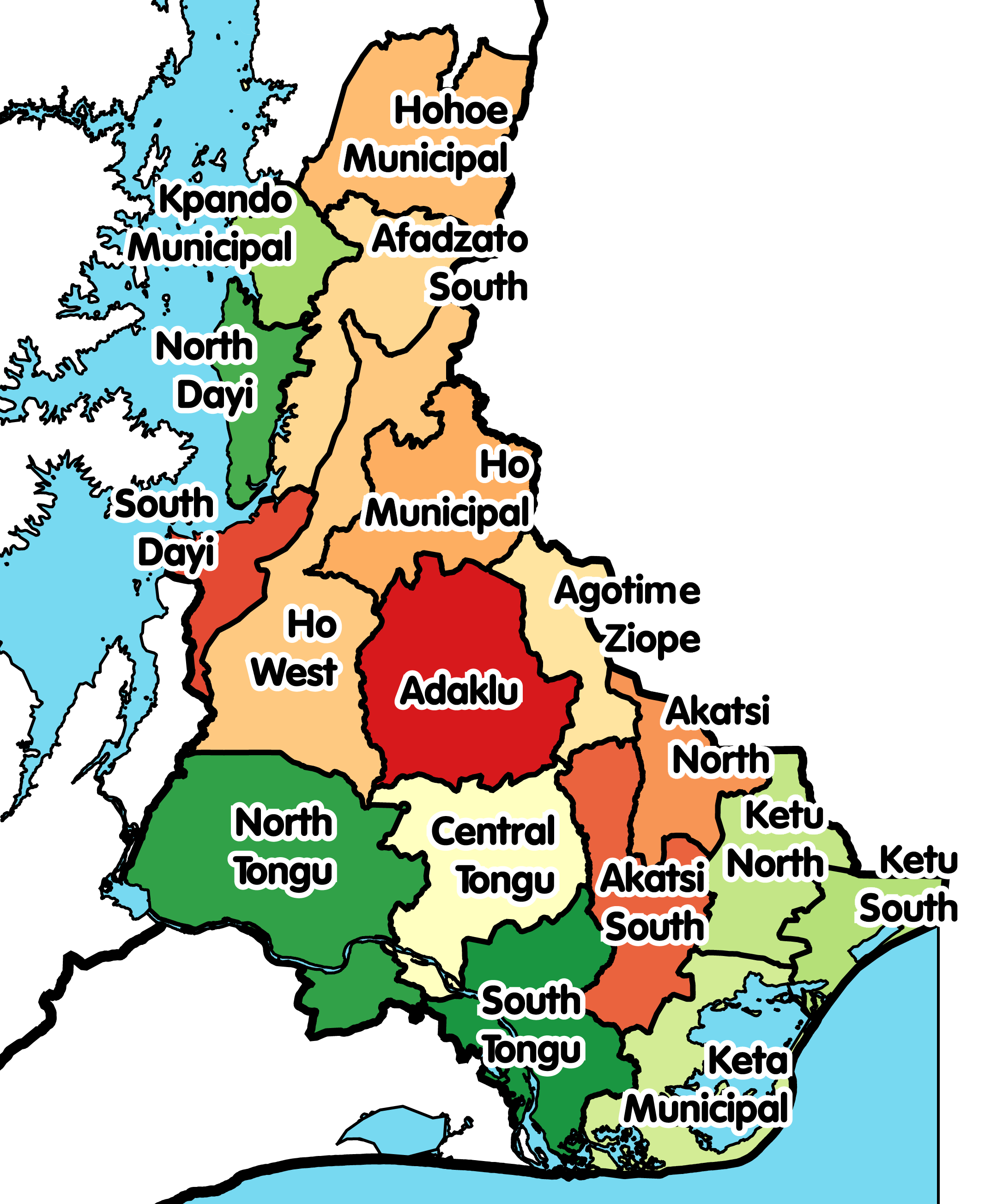
- Districts of Volta Region

- Location of North Tongu District within Volta
- Coordinates: 6°04′04.1″N 0°25′01.1″E
- Country: Ghana
- Region: Volta
- Capital: Battor Dugame

Government
  - District Executive: Hon. Arku Richard Collins

Area
  - Total: 1,117 km^{2} (431 sq mi)

Population (2021)
  - Total: 110,891
  - Density: 99.28/km^{2} (257.1/sq mi)
- Time zone: UTC+0 (GMT)
- ISO 3166 code: GH-TV-NT

North Tongu District is one of the eighteen districts in Volta Region, Ghana. Originally it was created as part of the then-larger North Tongu District on 10 March 1989, with Adidome as its capital town, which was created from the former Tongu District Council, until the western part of the district was split off to create a new North Tongu District on 28 June 2012, with Battor Dugame as its capital town, which was established by Legislative Instrument (L.I.) 2081; thus the remaining part has been renamed as Central Tongu District, with Adidome as its capital town, which was established by Legislative Instrument (L.I.) 2077.The district has a male population of 43,990(47.1%) and female population of 49,370 which constitutes (52.9%) The total population is 93,360. The Assembly has eleven(11) Departments and other units with Heads of Departments who all report directly to the District Coordinating Director(DCD) and ultimately to the District Chief Executive(DCE).The General Assembly meetings are presided over by the Presiding Member(PM). The district assembly is located in Addidome, near Adidome Senior High School (Adisec) the southwest part of Volta Region and has Battor Dugame as its capital town.

== Boundaries ==
North Tongu District is bounded by:

- the Lake Volta to the west,
- Ho Municipal District and the Akatsi South District to the east,
- South Tongu District to the south east, and
- Adaklu District to the north.

== Topography ==
The vegetation lies in the Tropical Savannah Grassland zone. The Volta River cuts the district into two halves from north to south.

== Villages ==
In addition to Battor Dugame, the capital and administrative centre, North Tongu District contains the following villages:

- Agoxor
- Akyemfo
- Avakpedome
- Aveyime-Battor
- Battor Dugame
- Kluma Dorfor
- Kpomkpo
- Dorfor Adidome
- Dove
- Juapong
- Kutime
- Kanuwlue
- Mepe
- New Fodzoku
- Podoe
- Sasekpe
- Torgorme
- Adexorkpodzi
- Volo
- Vome
- Vume Kpoviadzi
- Zomayi
- Nyatikpo
- Mafi-Kpevekor
- Gbetekpo-Azagonorkope

== See also ==
- North Tongu Constituency

== Sources ==
- "Districts of Ghana". Statoids.
- GhanaDistricts.com
