= Dagbamatey =

Town in Volta Region, Ghana

Dagbamatey Dakpamatey
- Town
- Location in Ghana
- Coordinates: 6°03′16″N 0°49′32″E
- Country: Ghana
- Region: Volta Region
- District: Akatsi South District
- Time zone: GMT
  - Summer (DST): GMT

Dagbamatey (also known as Dakpamatey) is a town located in Akatsi South District in the Volta Region of Ghana. The town is known for the Afetorku Gbordzi (which means Afetorku Shrine). The people of Dagbamatey celebrate the Apetorku Easter Festival.

== History ==
As at 2019, the Chief of Dagbamatey is Torgbui Klu Agudzeamegah ll and the queen mother of Dagbamatey is Mama Adzahlor lll.

== Institutions ==
- Dagbamatey Basic School

== Notable native ==
- Sergeant Michael Dotse Dzamesi
