= Tongu District =

- Former District Council
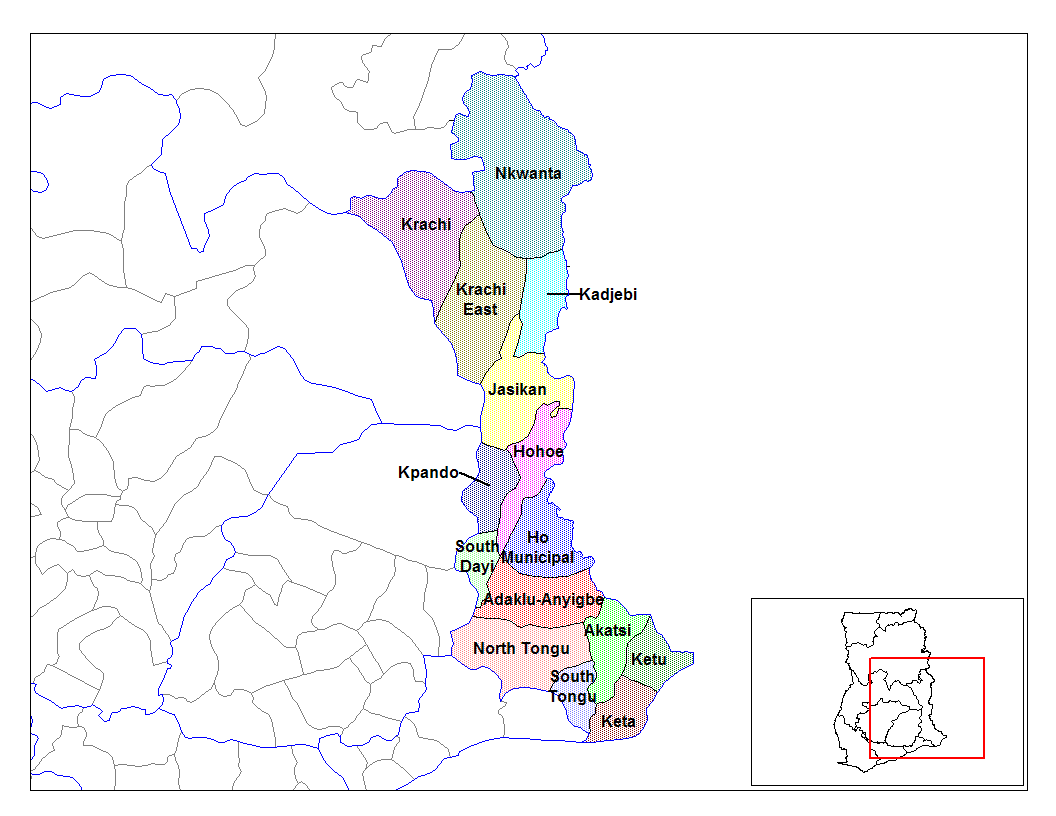
- Districts of Volta Region

- Location of Tongu District within Volta
- Coordinates: 6°0′0.36″N 0°35′56.76″E
- Country: Ghana
- Region: Volta
- Capital: Sogakope
- Time zone: UTC+0 (GMT)
- ISO 3166 code: GH-TV-__

Tongu District is a former district council that was located in Volta Region, Ghana. Originally created as an ordinary district assembly in 1975. However on 10 March 1989, it was split off into two new district assemblies: South Tongu District (capital: Sogakope) and the first North Tongu District (currently known as Central Tongu District; capital: Adidome). The district assembly was located in the southwest part of Volta Region and had Sogakope as its capital town.
