= Nyigbla Festival =

Festival in Ghana by the people of Afife in the Volta region

Nyigbla Festival is an annual festival celebrated by the chiefs and people of Afife near Akatsi in the Volta Region of Ghana. It is usually celebrated in the month of February.

== Celebrations ==
During the festival, visitors are welcomed to share food and drinks. The people put on traditional clothes and there is durbar of chiefs. There is also dancing and drumming. War dances, bonfires and songs climax the occasion.

== Significance ==
This festival is celebrated for thanksgiving and the commemoration of the Anlo-Ewe migration to their present area.
