= Three Town Senior High School =

School in Ghana

Coordinates: 6°05′45.9″N 1°08′21.9″E

Three Town Senior High School (TTSS) is a second cycle institution located in Hedzranawo-Denu in the Ketu South Municipal, Volta Region of Ghana.

== History ==
It was established in January 1991 as a day school, making it among the oldest schools in Southern Volta, until it was absorbed by the government. The name Threetown is as a result of the schools location in the heart of three towns; Denu, Hedzranawo and Adafienu. The school took part in the National Science and Maths Quiz at the regional level.

== Courses Offered ==
General Arts

Visual Arts

Home Economics

Business

Agricultural Science

General Science

== Facilities ==
Boarding

Science Lab

Computer Lab
