= Central Tongu District =

- District
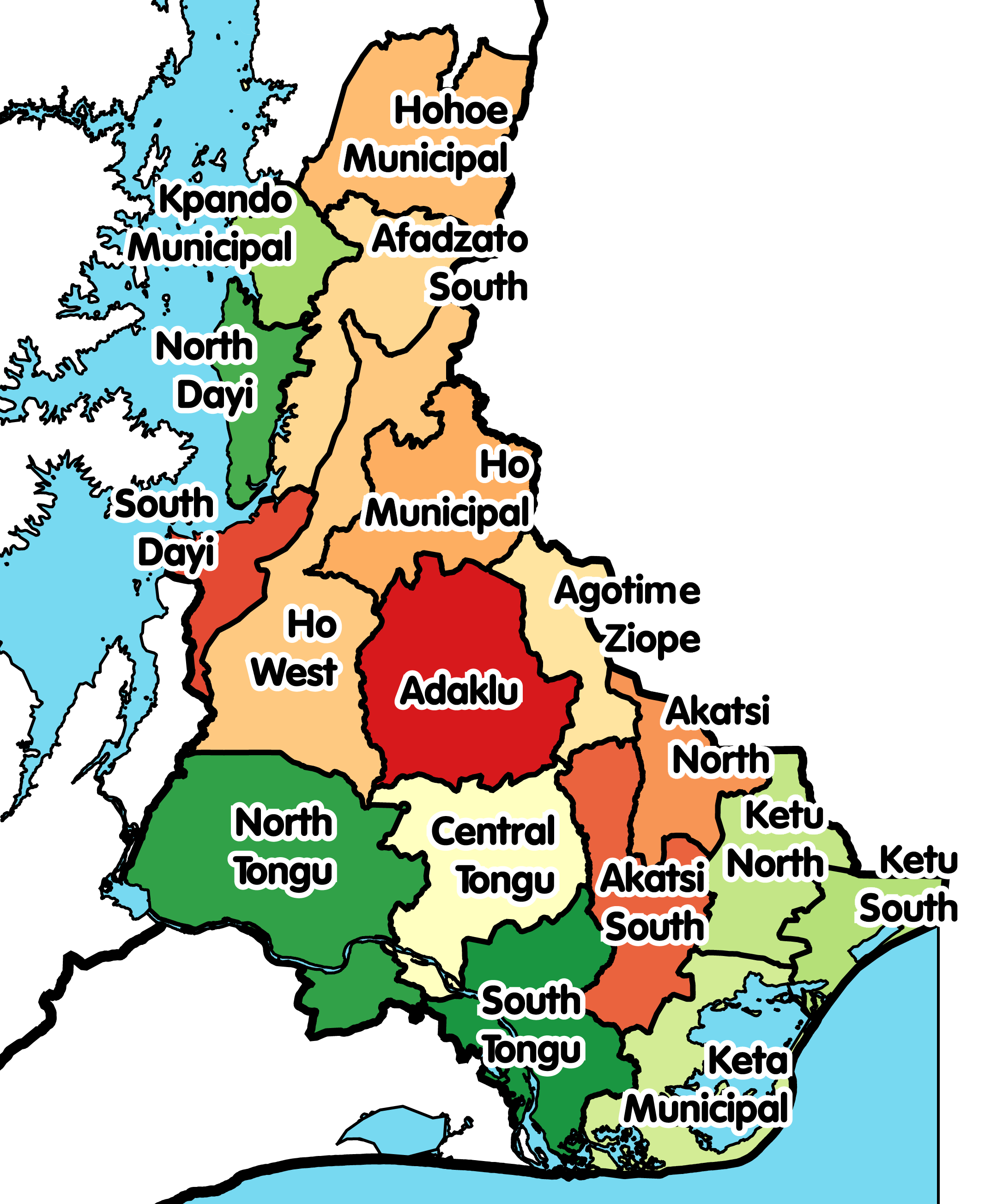
- Districts of Volta Region

- Location of South Tongu District within Volta
- Coordinates: 6°04′26.66″N 0°29′59.25″E
- Country: Ghana
- Region: Volta
- Capital: Adidome

Government
  - District Executive: Hon.

Area
  - Total: 677.4 km^{2} (261.5 sq mi)

Population (2021)
  - Total: 83,803
  - Density: 123.7/km^{2} (320.4/sq mi)
- Time zone: UTC+0 (GMT)
- ISO 3166 code: GH-TV-CT

Central Tongu District is one of the eighteen districts in Volta Region, Ghana. Originally created as an ordinary district assembly on 10 March 1989 when it was known as the first North Tongu District, with Adidome as its capital town, which was created from the former Tongu District Council, However on 28 June 2012, the western part of the district was split off to create a new North Tongu District, with Battor Dugame as its capital town, which was established by Legislative Instrument (L.I.) 2081; thus the remaining part has been renamed as Central Tongu District, with Adidome as its capital town, which was established by Legislative Instrument (L.I.) 2077. The district assembly is located in the southwest part of Volta Region and has Adidome as its capital town.

== History ==
Central Tongu District was first established in 1989 as Adidome District. The name was later changed into North Tongu District as the district's inhabitants pushed for a more unifying name for the district. The district's current member of parliament is Samuel Okudzeto Ablakwa, the former deputy minister for education in charge of tertiary.

== Geography ==
The district is bordered to the north by Adaklu District and Agotime Ziope District, to the east by Akatsi South District, to the south by South Tongu District, and to the west by North Tongu District and Ho West District. According to the 2010 census, the population of the district is 59,411, with 27,790 males and 31,621 females.
