= Fieve Kpor Legba Festival =

Festival in Ghana by the people of Fievie in the Volta region

Fievie Kpor Legba Festival is a bi-annual festival celebrated by the chiefs and people of Fievie-Dugame in the North Tongu district in the Volta Region of Ghana. It is usually celebrated in the month of March.

== Celebrations ==
During the festival, visitors are welcomed to share food and drinks. The people put on traditional clothes and there is durbar of chiefs. There is also dancing and drumming.

== Significance ==
This festival is celebrated to mark an event that took place in the past.
