= Aveyime-Battor =

- Village
- Location of Adidome in Ghana
- Coordinates: 06°04′07″N 00°24′06″E
- Country: Ghana
- Region: Volta Region
- District: North Tongu District
- Elevation: 6 m (20 ft)
- Time zone: GMT
  - Summer (DST): GMT
- Area code: +233 36 26

Aveyime-Battor is a village in the North Tongu District in the Volta Region of Ghana.

== Geography ==
The Volta River flows close to Aveyime-Battor on its way into the Atlantic Ocean.

== Education ==
Aveyime-Battor is known for the Aveyime Battor Secondary Technical School. The school is a second cycle institution.

== See also ==
- North Tongu (Ghana parliament constituency)

== External links and sources ==
- GhanaDistricts
