= Asikoe Festival =

Festival in Ghana by the Anfoega people

Asikoe Festival is an annual festival celebrated by the chiefs and people of Anfoega in the Volta Region of Ghana. It is usually celebrated in the month of March.

== Celebrations ==
During the festival, visitors are welcomed to share food and drinks. The people put on traditional clothes and there is durbar of chiefs. There is also dancing and drumming.

== Significance ==
This festival is celebrated to mark an event that took place in the past.
