= Tsriefe =

Community in Volta Region, Ghana

Adaklu-Tsriefe Tsrefe
- Town
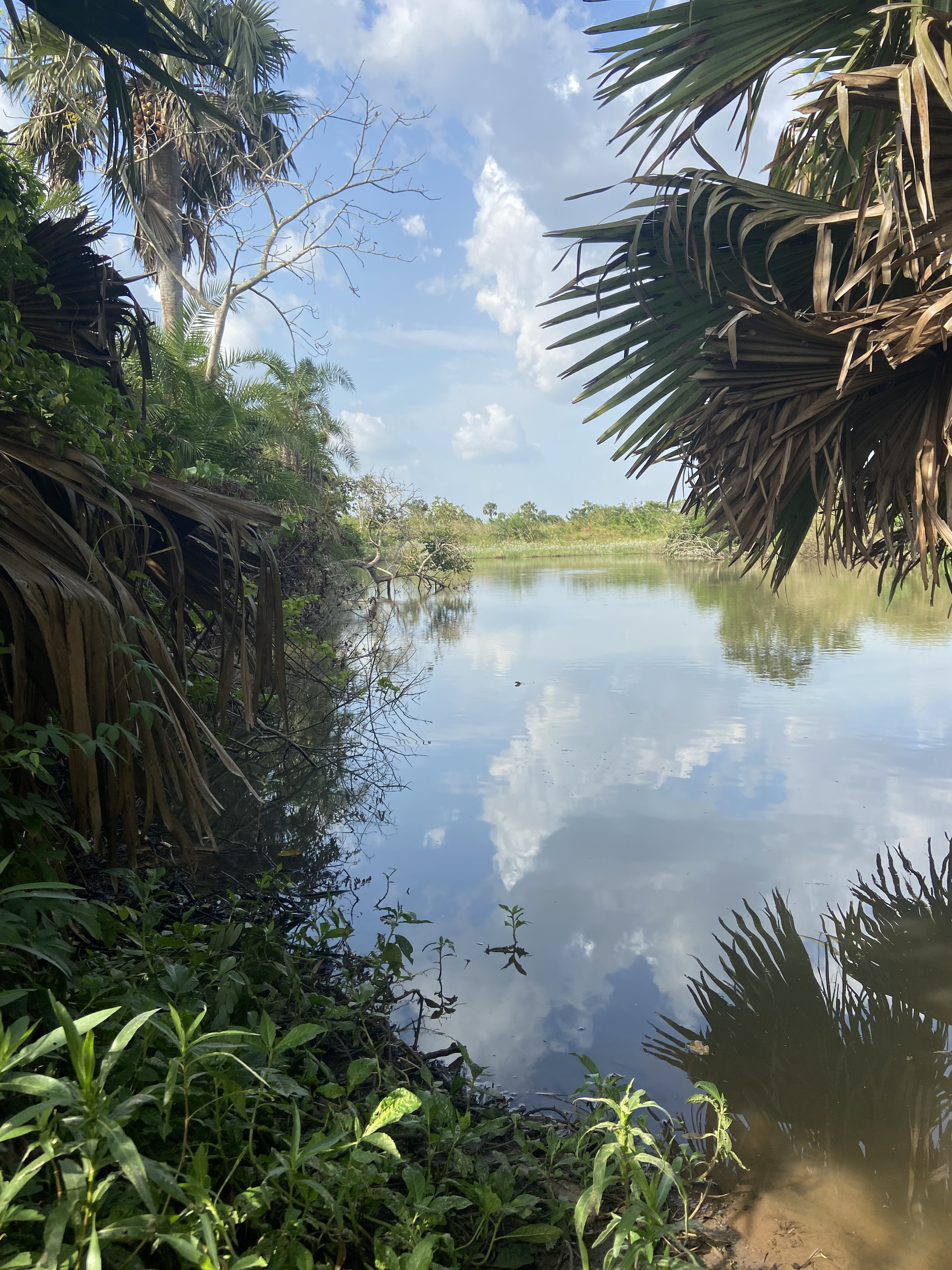
- Tsriefe water source

- Location of Adaklu-Tsriefe in Volta Region
- Coordinates: 06°30′36.70″N 00°29′19.55″E
- Country: Ghana
- Region: Volta Region
- District: Adaklu District
- Time zone: UTC0 (GMT)

Adaklu-Tsriefe (also spelt Tsrefe) is a community in the Adaklu District in the Volta Region of Ghana. As at 2026, the warlord (Etufia) of the town is Togbe Edem III. As at 2023, the population of the community was 450.

== Institutions ==
- Friends of Adaklu, an NGO
- Assemblies of God Church
- Good Life Centre
- Adaklu Tsriefe Basic School
