= Nyive =

Town in the Volta Region of Ghana

Nyive is a town in Ho Municipal in the Volta Region of Ghana. The town was named after an Elephant forest was found near River Tordzie (atiglinyi, nyi = elephant; ave = forest: Elephant Forest).

== Geography ==
The estimated terrain elevation above sea level is 30 metres. Latitude: 6°2'41.46" Longitude: 0°37'49.33". A little further northeast and lying on the left bank of River Tordzie is the region of Nyive, the 'Elephant Forest'.
