= Hedzranawo =

Coordinates: 6°05′N 1°08′E

Hedzranawo is a town located in the Volta Region of Ghana between Denu and Adafienu.
