= Kwasi Etu-Bonde =

Ghanaian politician

Member of the Ghana Parliament for Kintampo North Constituency
- In office 7 January 2017 – 6 January 2021
- Succeeded by: Joseph Kwame Kumah

Personal details
- Born: 13 October 1968 (age 57) Vume, Ghana
- Party: National Democratic Congress
- Children: 5
- Education: Ghana Institute of Management and Public Administration
- Occupation: Entrepreneur
- Profession: Politician

Kwasi Etu-Bonde is a Ghanaian politician and member of the Seventh Parliament of the Fourth Republic of Ghana representing the Kintampo North Constituency in the Bono East Region on the ticket of the National Democratic Congress. In 2019, he was ranked the 2nd Best Performing Member of Parliament in the Bono East Region.

== Early life ==
Kwasi Etu-Bonde born in Vume in the Volta Region of Ghana on October 13, 1968 is a Ghanaian politician and member of the Seventh Parliament of the Fourth Republic of Ghana representing the Kintampo North Constituency in the Brong-Ahafo Region on the ticket of the National Democratic Congress.

== Education ==
Etu-Bonde studied at the GIMPA (SME, Development and Management) where he received an EMBA in 2004.

== Career ==
Etu-Bonde is an entrepreneur and CEO of SKY-3 Investments Limited and Sustenance Agro Ventures located in Kintampo. He is a law maker and an agriculturist.

== Politics ==
In 2015 he contested and won the NDC parliamentary primaries for Kintampo North constituency in the Bono East Region of Ghana. He won this parliamentary seat during the 2016 Ghanaian general elections. He won with 22,407 votes making 53.89% of the total votes cast whilst the NPP parliamentary candidate Nkangmah Mateerl Charles had 17,610 votes making 42.36% of the total votes cast. He was succeeded by Joseph Kwame Kumah during the National Democratic Congress primaries in the Kintampo North Constituency after he declined to contest.

== Personal life ==
Etu-Bonde is married with five children.

== Religion ==
Etu-Bonde is a Christian.
