= Shia, Ghana =

Shia
- Town
- Nickname: Small London
- Location within Ghana
- Coordinates: 6°47′N 0°34′E
- Country: Ghana
- Region: Volta Region
- District: Ho Municipal
- Time zone: GMT
  - Summer (DST): GMT

Shia is a town in the Ho Municipal District, a district of the Volta Region of Ghana.

== Etymology ==
The name Shia originates from the activities of the Forebears of Shia who were particularly brave and so decided to carry out an act of knowing the content of an item and in the process tore open the item. The noise that emanated from the process was used to describe the people who had engaged in that act. The noise was shiiaaa and so the people were identified as the Shia people.

== Location ==
Shia is a town in Ghana within the Volta Region of Ghana. It is located about 16 Kilometers from Ho the regionals capital of the Volta region. It is to the east of Ho and is a border town between Ghana and Togo. It is within the Ho district and resides in the Shia-Ave constituency for electoral purposes. It is one of three border towns within the eastern Ho corridor.

== History ==
The Shia people were part of the original Ewe people who originated from Notsie in Nigeria and travelled all the way through Benin, Togo, through the Keta and Anlo areas and finally settled in Ho and surrounding areas. The Shia people in particular settled at Taviefe where they were for several years and only moved to their present location after some disagreement with colleagues about the content of product which resulted in them splitting the item into two which ultimately resulted in them being forced to vacate the community to their present-day place.

== Climate ==
The Climate of Shia is a forest area with rainfall patterns similar to that of Ho. It lies 153 millimeters above sea level. It has a tropical climate. The average annual temperature is 26.8 degrees Celsius. It has about three active seasons; Rainfall Season, Mix of autumn and spring season and Harmattan season.

== Administration ==
Shia is in the Ho District and has Ho as the district capital. Shia is also part of the Norvisi Traditional area made of 11 communities who decided to be together for purposes of unity and development.

== Demographics ==
The town has a population of about 2000 inhabitants. There are more women and children than men. The population split is guessed at 60/40 split in favour of women.

== Migration ==
There has been significant migration of the people of Shia to the cities. The main cities that have benefitted from the skills of the people of Shia are Accra, Kumasi and Ho. There has also been the migration of Shia people abroad. It is estimated there would be over 100 Shia person domiciled abroad.

== Housing ==
The community was communally developed. The houses are well spaced with cleared streets etc.

== Economy ==
The Economy is agrarian and some minimal commercial activities that are mainly driven by the activities at the Ghana Togo border.

=== Primary sector ===
The primary sector is Agriculture

== Education ==
There are a number of schools from Pre-schools through to Jss and Secondary school. There is however no tertiary school in the community.

== Healthcare ==
There is one active Health Clinic in the community that takes care of the people.

== Infrastructure ==
There is a motorable road to the community. The road is tarred and leads from Ho and ends at Shia.

=== Transportation ===
There are taxis and buses that ply the road to Shia. The private sector provides regular active transportation.

== Sport ==
Shia had an active football club called Shia mighty warriors. Unfortunately due to administrative challenges the club is not so active.

== Places of worship ==
There are a lot of active Orthodox, evangelical, Pentecostal and Charismatic churches

Churches include: Catholic Church, Evangelical Presbyterian church, Assemblies of God Church, Pentecost Church, Christ is the same Church, Light House Church and Global Evangelical Presbyterian church.

== Culture ==
The culture of the people is built on the general culture of the Ewe people of Ghana. The Shia people are humanist in nature. Their activities are communal in that they are each other's keepers. The family structures are built around the extended family.

Shia houses a Senior High and Technical School, a second cycle institution that was admitted by the Ghana Education Service in 2010.
