= Hatsukope =

- Country: Ghana
- Region: Volta Region

Hatsukope is a village in Aflao, Volta Region of Ghana. The town is known for the St. Paul’s Senior High School or St. Paul’s Boys College (SPACO). The school is a second cycle institution.
