= Mac Sarbah =

Ghanaian entrepreneur

MacLean Sarbah
- Born: Yeji, Brong Ahafo region
- Citizenship: Ghana
- Education: Harvard University, University of Cambridge, Columbia University, University of Ghana

MacLean Sarbah, MA, MPhil, MDes, is a Ghanaian philanthropist and Innovator. He is currently the Diversity, Equity, and Inclusion (DEI) Leader within the Global Health Office of the President at the Bill and Melinda Gates Foundation.

== Early life and education ==
Mac Sarbah was raised in Yeji, a rural town in Ghana’s Brong Ahafo Region, as one of eight children. His parents were immigrants from Mepe in the Volta Region. He attended Adidome Senior Secondary School in the Volta Region.

Mac attended the University of Ghana in 2002, earning a Bachelor of Arts in Social Sciences in 2006. He continued his studies at Columbia University, receiving a Master of Arts in Social-Organizational Psychology and a certificate in Cooperation and Conflict Resolution in 2012. The following year, he completed a Master of Philosophy in Innovation, Strategy, and Organization at the University of Cambridge. From 2017 to 2019, he studied at Harvard University, where he earned a master's degree in Risk and Resilience.

== Career ==
Mac Sarbah is the Diversity, Equity, and Inclusion Leader at the Bill and Melinda Gates Foundation Global Health Office of the President.

Previously, he founded and led EdAcme, an initiative focused on access to higher education and career opportunities for marginalized groups.

== Social Initiatives ==
Mac Sarbah is the founder of EdAcme, an initiative focused on youth entrepreneurship and education. He also serves as the president of the Sarbah Foundation, an organization that supports education, entrepreneurship, and social impact initiatives in Ghana and across Africa,.

== Personal life and family ==
Mac is one of eight children of John Kwame Mensah Sarbah. He was raised in Yeji, a town in Ghana's Brong-Ahafo Region. His mother left the family when he was less than two years old. His father, who had no formal education, oversaw his early academic development.

Mac has seven siblings born to their father, John Kwame Mensah Sarbah. He was raised in Yeji, a rural town in Ghana’s Brong-Ahafo region. His mother left home when he was less than two years old, but his father, who had no formal education and who was a disciplinarian, guided and shaped him academically in the early years

== Awards and recognition ==
During his early education, Sarbah received the Best Student Award in the North Tongu District, Ghana. While at the University of Ghana, he was given an academic excellence award in his second year.

In 2019, he was recognized by several institutions: ICEF listed him as a notable contributor to global education; the Harvard Gazette featured him as a "Stellar Harvardian"; and the University of North Texas at Dallas presented him with a Social Impact Leadership Award.

Also in 2019, the Bonsu Royal Educational Complex in Yeji named a school block the "Maclean Sarbah Block" in his honor.
