= Vume =

- Town
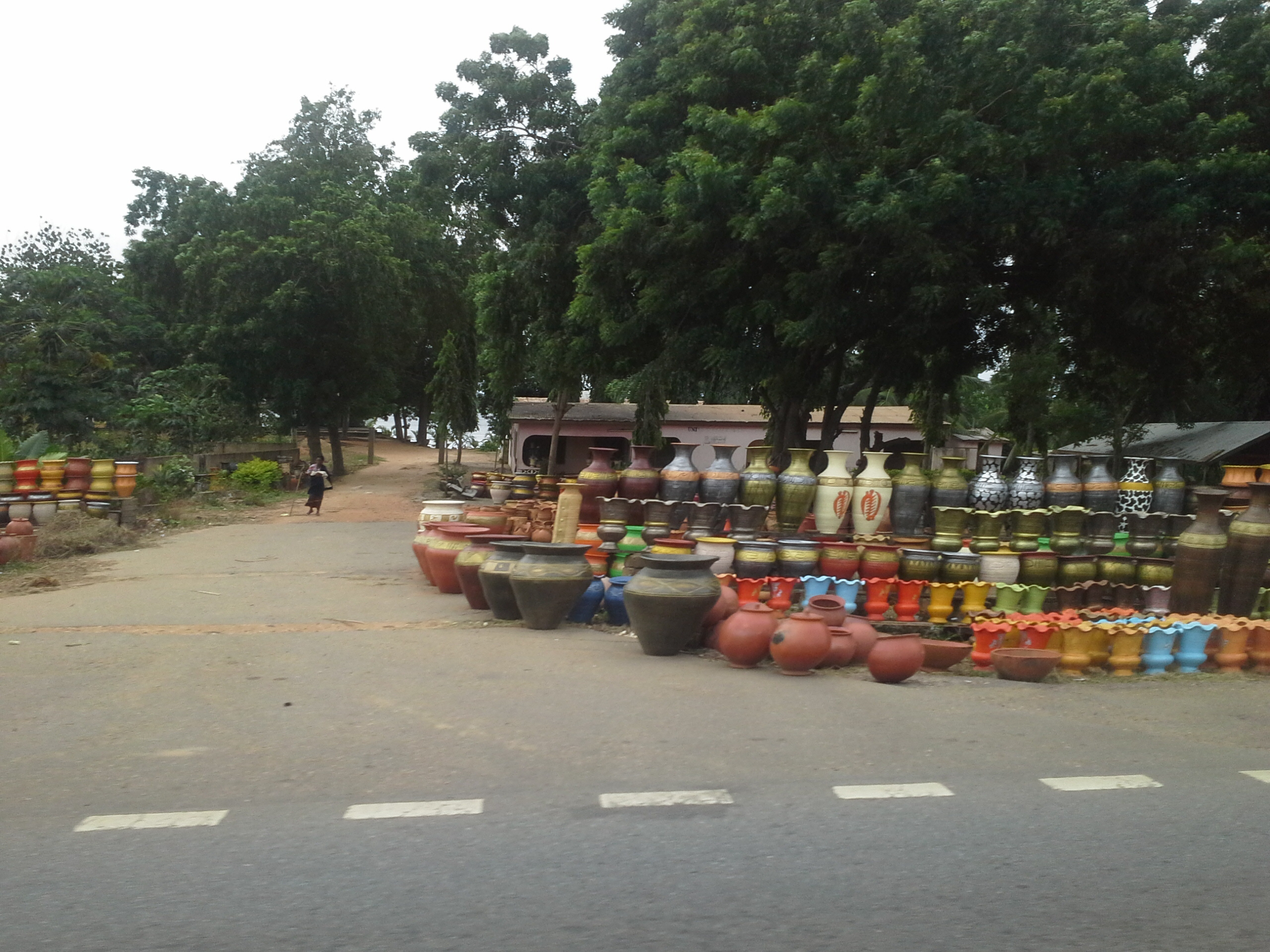
- Pots displayed along the Trans–West African Coastal Highway at Vume

- Location of Vume in Ghana
- Coordinates: 06°00′29″N 00°33′12″E
- Country: Ghana
- Region: Volta Region
- District: South Tongu District
- Time zone: GMT
  - Summer (DST): GMT

Vume is a small town in the South Tongu District of the Volta Region near Sogakope. The residents of Vume are well noted for the art of pottery.
