= Kpetoe =

Coordinates: 6°33′N 0°42′E

- Interactive map of Kpetoe
- Country: Ghana
- Region: Volta Region

Kpetoe is a town in the Agortime Ziope District in the Volta Region of Ghana. The town is known for the Agotime Secondary School. The school is a second cycle institution.
