= St. Paul's Senior High School =

Ghanaian high school

St. Paul's Senior High School or St. Paul's Boys College (SPACO), formerly St. Paul's Secondary, is a Ghanaian boys' senior high school located at Hatsukope-Denu in the Ketu South Municipal District of the Volta Region.

== History and operations ==
Established in 1958, it is a Catholic school that is part of the Roman Catholic Diocese of Keta–Akatsi and has a minor seminary attached to it.

The school has the nickname SPACO derived from its name and sometimes referred to as Border University, however, the alumni (the old students' union) call themselves Conquerors after the school motto, ('Do good and conquer evil Vince In Bono Malum'). In the year 2000 the school was made a mixed school to promote girl child education in the Volta Region. After the first batch completed the school was turned again to boys school and has till date remained a boys school.

== Facilities ==
- Boarding
- Hostel
- Science Lab
- I.T. Lab

== Programmes offered ==
- Business
- General arts
- General science
- Visual arts

== See also ==
- Education in Ghana
- List of senior high schools in Ghana
- Roman Catholicism in Ghana
