= Seth Anthony =

Ghanaian soldier and diplomat (1915–2008)

Major Seth Anthony MBE
- Born: 16 June 1915
- Died: 20 November 2008 (aged 93)
- Military career
- Allegiance: Ghana
- Branch: Royal West African Frontier Force; British Army
- Service years: 1939–1946
- Rank: Major
- Unit: 81st (West Africa) Division
- Commands: 5th Battalion, Gold Coast Regiment
- Conflicts: Second World War, *Burma Campaign
- Awards: MBE; Burma Star Badge
- Other work: Diplomatic Service

Major Seth Kobla Anthony, MBE (15 June 1915 – 20 November 2008) was a Ghanaian soldier and diplomat. He was the first black African-born soldier to be commissioned as an officer in the British Army.

== Early life and education ==
Seth Anthony was born at Adafienu in the Volta Region of Ghana. His parents were Timothy Agbetsiafa Anthony and Juliana Seakowuwo. Seth Anthony started his elementary education at the Bremen Mission School at Keta also in the Volta Region of Ghana in 1920. He completed in 1929. He proceeded to the Achimota School intending to train as a teacher. His admission was deferred for a year as he was thought to be too young. His progress was so impressive he was fast tracked to the secondary education section. One of his course mates at the time was Kofi Abrefa Busia. He was the head prefect in 1935.

== Career ==
Anthony joined the staff of the Achimota School to teach Latin, English and Mathematics in 1937. Later during the Second World War he enlisted as a private with the British Army. His unit was the Fifth Battalion of the Gold Coast Regiment. He enrolled at the Royal Military College at Sandhurst in England in 1941 and was commissioned as a Second Lieutenant in 1942. He served with the 81st Division of the Royal West African Frontier Force, where he became the first African commissioned officer in the history of the British Army.

Following the Second World War, Anthony served as an Assistant District Officer, a position held by only two other Africans at the time (one was Kofi Busia, who became Prime Minister of Ghana in 1969). Prior to Ghana's independence in March 1957, Anthony was in the infant diplomatic service and attached to the British embassy in Washington, D.C. He later opened Ghana's embassy there and was the first Chargé d'affaires of the new Ghanaian diplomatic mission in Washington, D.C. He was at the same time Ghana's Acting Representative to the United Nations and delivered the acceptance speech when Ghana was admitted into the UN. He was the Ghanaian High Commissioner to India between 1962 and 1966, after which he was the High Commissioner to the United Kingdom until 1970. He also served as High Commissioner to Canada until his retirement in 1973.

== Honours ==
Anthony was awarded the Order of the Star of Ghana, the highest national civilian award in Ghana in July 2006. He was also awarded an MBE after seeing action in Myohaung, Burma in 1945. The Ghana army's Jungle Warfare School at Akyem Achiase is named Seth Anthony Barracks after Major Anthony. Viscount Slim, son of Field Marshal William Slim and president of the Burma Star Association, awarded Major Anthony with the Burma Star Badge in 2008.

== Family ==
Seth Anthony was married to Adelaide Arajoah Anthony. He had three sons, John Kobla Anthony, Lucas Amegbe Anthony (deceased), and Samuel Kwashie Anthony, and five daughters, Mrs Selina Amayo Dankwa, Mrs Christiana Anokware Addae, Elizabeth Amewusika Anthony, Adelaide Emefa Anthony and Sophia Mawuena Anthony.
