= Ho Teaching Hospital =

- Ministry of Health

Geography
- Location: Ho, Volta, Ghana
- Coordinates: 6.60126°N 0.48404°E

Organisation
- Care system: Public - Ghana Health Service

Links
- Lists: Hospitals in Ghana

Ho Teaching Hospital formerly Volta Regional Hospital and popularly known as Trafalgar is the regional and teaching hospital in Ho in the Volta Region of Ghana. It was the main referral facility in the Volta Region until it was upgraded to a teaching hospital in 2019 to serve the University of Health and Allied Sciences. It was commissioned as a Teaching Hospital by the Minister of Health, Hon. Kwaku Agyemang Manu on 29 April 2019 after the Hospital went through strenuous accreditation process by all the Health Professional Regulatory Bodies and the Health Facilities Regulatory Authority in Ghana.

== Directorates ==
The facility has seven (7) directorates that help the facility achieve its vision of becoming "The Premium Hospital in Innovative Tertiary Health Care, Medical Education and Research"

- Medical Affairs
- Administration & Support Services
- Nursing Administration
- Human Resources
- Research, Innovation, Planning, Monitoring and Evaluation
- Finance
- Pharmacy

== Clinical departments ==
- Internal Medicine
- Surgical
- Obstetrics & Gynaecology
- Child Health
- Public health

== Governing Board ==
- Dr. Felix Gamesu Kwaku Anyah - Chairman
- Dr. Dr. John B.K Tampouri - Chief Executive Officer
- Prof Lydia Aziato - Member
- Mr. Kofi Ampofo Agyapong - Member
- Dr. Prince Sodoke Amuzu - Member
- Justice Ernest Gaewu - Member
- Dr. Dr. Emmanuel Kofi Amponsah - Member
- Dr. Audu Rauf - Member
- Mr. Felix Nyante - Member
- Dr. Sylvia Ayele Deganus - Member
- Mr. Victor Andy Danku - Member

== Donation ==
The company Latex Foam presented the Ho Teaching Hospital mattresses worth GH¢62,000, courtesy of Madam Gifty Ekeocha Appiah, to improve patient care and comfort.

== See also ==
- List of hospitals in the Volta Region
