= Akatsi College of Education =

Teacher training school in Ghana

Coordinates: 6.125585°N 0.8018025°E

- Collège d'éducation Akatsi; Akatsi Sukudede ƒe Kɔledzi
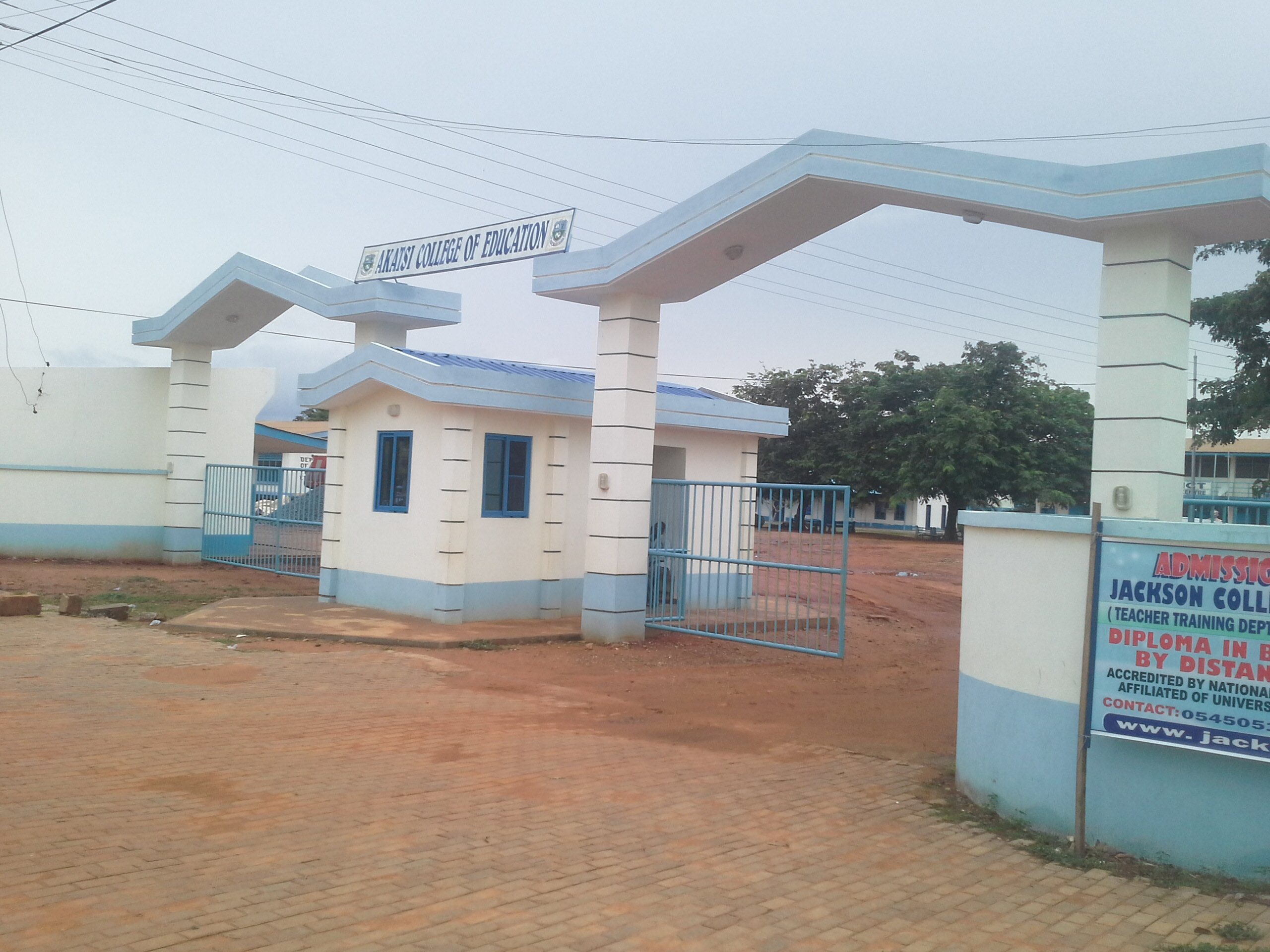
- Main entrance
- Other name: Akatsico
- Motto: Quality teacher education in a changing society (French: Une formation de qualité pour les enseignants dans une société en mutation; Ewe: Nufialawo ƒe hehenana nyui le hadomegbenɔnɔ si le tɔtrɔm me)
- Established: 1 October 1963
- Parent institution: Government of Ghana
- Location: Akatsi, Volta Region, Akatsi South District, Ghana
- Language: Ewe, French and English

Akatsi College of Education (French: Collège d'éducation Akatsi; Ewe: Akatsi Sukudede ƒe Kɔledzi; AKATSICO) is a teacher training college located at Akatsi in the Volta Region of Ghana. It was established on 1 October 1963. Its motto is "Quality teacher education in a changing society", and the college is home to more than 700 students.

== History ==
Akatsi College of Education was first established as Akatsi Training College on 1 October 1963. It was however officially opened on 25 October 1963 with 42 all male students and teaching staff of 4 including the principal.

Akatsi College of Education (AKATSICO) is in the Volta Region of Ghana and is along the main Accra-Aflao road, about thirty kilometers east of the lower Volta Bridge at Sogakofe.

The government of Ghana at the time had decided to open more teacher training colleges in order to train more teachers to augment the teacher population of the country. Some of these new colleges opened in the Volta Region at the time were at Dzodze, Ho, Anloga, Shia, Dabala and Akatsi.

Akatsi Training College was to be established in the deserted corrugated ted iron sheets structures of Taylor Woodrow Construction Firm. Taylor Woodrow Construction Firm was the construction firm that constructed the Akatsi - Denu section of the Accra – Aflao road. They left behind a road camp with uncompleted buildings.

Mr. Seth Kwabla Ahiable was appointed the first principal of the college. Other tutors were Mr. Cletus Avugla Akorli, senior housemaster; Mr.Michael Adodo Gaba; Mr. Leo Marues Adotey, and Mr. E.N Pomary. An effort by Mr. Ahiable to bring Mr. Rockman Damalie, who was then teaching at Kpando Secondary School could not work until the following year. However, he was with principal on the first day of opening and helped him with the initial effort to get the students settled. One Mrs. De Souza was employed as a cook and she cooked the first meal for the first batch of students who arrived on the first day.

The initial intake of students numbered 42 were admitted from Accra, most of them were staff of the workers Brigade who opted to be trained as teachers. Hence, many of them were from outside the Volta Region. By 28 October, the students' population had risen to 56. The college became coeducational in the 1967/68 academic year when 24 female students were admitted. The college has remained coeducational to date.

Two prominent people who fought for the establishment of the college were Mr. M.K Maglo, the then Member of Parliament for Avenor and Mr. John G. Bedzo, also the then District Commissioner for Avenor. Torgbui Letsa Korba released a parcel of land for the establishment of the college. The initial challenges the college faced were the non-availability of water and electricity. Students had to trek to dams outside the town to bring unwholesome water to the college for use. Staff therefore decided to harvest rain water. Taylor Woodrow had left strong concrete platforms which strengthened the base of water tanks constructed. The college also relied on water tankers for water.

Principals since 1963:
Name	Years served
Mr. S. K. Ahiable	Oct. 1963 – Sept 1973
Mr. B. E. K. Kpesese	Sept 1973 – Mar 1974
Mr. J. B. Yegbe	Mar. 1974 – Sept 1974
Mr. N. T. Nortey	Sept 1974 – Oct. 1982
Mr. P. K. Avornyo	Oct. 1982 – Oct. 1991
Mr. D. K. Novieto	Oct. 1991 – Aug. 1993
Mr. S. K. Zonyra	Aug. 1993 – Aug. 1995
Mr. M. A. Y. Aheto	Sept 1995 – Apr. 1999
Mr. S. K. Dewotor	Apr.1999 - May. 2001
Mr. J. K. Kpeglo	May 2001 – Apr. 2008

== Programs ==
Akatsi College of Education has run various programmes at various stages of her growth. It started with the Certificate "A" (4-year) Post Middle Programme. The first batch of students completed in 1967. This programme remained until 1974, when the first 2-year Agriculture Specialist Course was rolled out to run simultaneously with the 4-year certificate "A" course. The Specialist Programme was discontinued in 1975 to give way to the 3-year Post Secondary Programme, The first batch of students was admitted in October 1975. In December 1974, Mr. J.B Yegbe who had been acting principal left the college for another assignment. Mr. Nathaniel T. Nortey took over the administration of the college. Mr. N.T Nortey in his time fought for a lot of infrastructural development for the college. During his tenure of office, he was able to facilitate four staff bungalows, the round hall and the commencement of the Letsa Korba Hall.

The 4-year Programme was suspended in 1978 when the last batch of its students passed out. In October 1981, the 4-year course was re-introduced as Modular Programme consisting of 2 years of sandwich vacation courses and 2 years of regular college tuition for an "A"- 4 year certificate. Eventually, all programmes except the 3-year Post Secondary Programme were terminated. The college is one out of ten which offers Technical and Science courses to train teachers especially for Junior High Schools in the country. In 2006, the Post Secondary Programme was phased out. The college started the 3-year Diploma in Basic Education.

The college participated in the DFID-funded T-TEL programme.

== See also ==
- List of colleges of education in Ghana
