= James Gunu =

Ghanaian politician (born 1972)

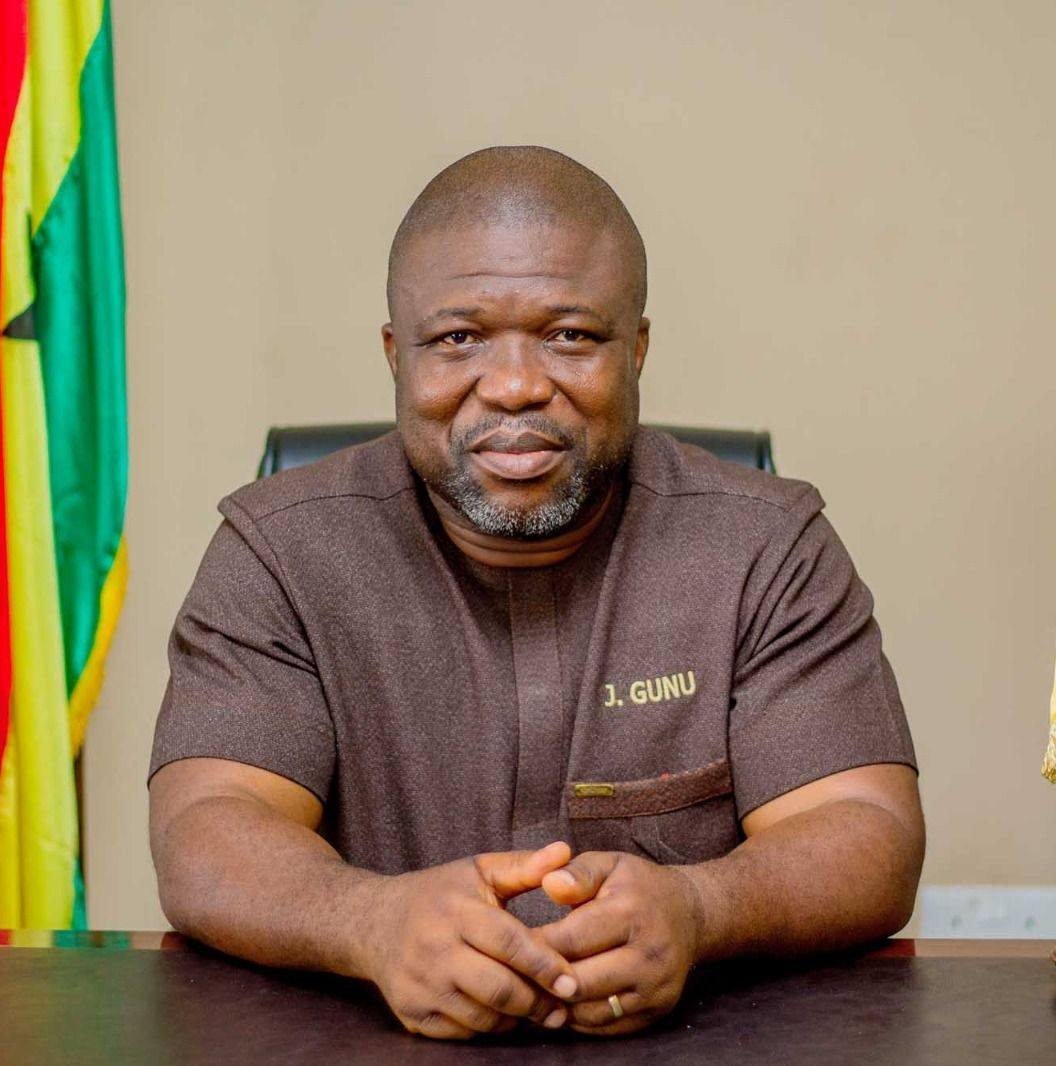

James Gunu (born 21 September 1972) is a Ghanaian politician, local governance specialist, and communication professional. He currently serves as the Volta Regional Minister, appointed in January 2025 by President John Dramani Mahama. He has been the Regional Secretary of the National Democratic Congress (NDC) in the Volta Region since 2018 and previously served as District Chief Executive for the Akatsi North District Assembly.

== Career ==
Gunu served as the first District Chief Executive for Akatsi North, where he chaired the District Security Council and supported district-level development and community engagement initiatives.

Before becoming Regional Minister, Gunu served as Regional Secretary of the NDC in the Volta Region. His work included coordinating regional party strategy, supporting communication efforts, and strengthening grassroots structures. He contributed to the party's electoral performance in the region during the 2024 elections.

Gunu was appointed Volta Regional Minister in January 2025 by President John Dramani Mahama. In this role, he oversees regional administration, development planning, inter-governmental coordination, and the implementation of national policy at the regional level.
