= Sokode Gbogame =

- Town
- Location within Ghana
- Coordinates: 6°34′N 0°24′E
- Country: Ghana
- Region: Volta Region
- District: Ho Municipal Assembly
- Time zone: GMT
  - Summer (DST): GMT

Sokode Gbogame is a town in the Ho Municipal Assembly of the Volta Region of Ghana.
