= Battor =

Battor Dugame
- District Capital
- Location in Ghana
- Coordinates: 6°04′04.1″N 0°25′01.1″E
- Country: Ghana
- Region: Volta Region
- District: Central Tongu District

Area
  - Land: 600 sq mi (1,600 km^{2})

Population (2012)
  - Total: 30,000
- Time zone: GMT
  - Summer (DST): GMT

Battor Dugame is the capital of the North Tongu District, which is one of the districts of the Volta Region, Ghana.

== District Change ==
Battor Dugame became part of Central Tongu District as it became an administrative capital in 2012.
