= Anfoega =

- Location in Ghana
- Coordinates: 6°53′11″N 0°16′38.2″E
- Country: Ghana
- Region: Volta Region
- Time zone: GMT
  - Summer (DST): GMT

Anfoega is a town in the Volta Region of Ghana. The town is known for the Anfoega Secondary School. The school is a second cycle institution.

== See also ==
- Asikoe Festival
