= Agortime-Kpetoe =

Agortime-Kpetoee Kpetoe
- town
- Location in Ghana
- Coordinates: 6°33′N 0°42′E
- Country: Ghana
- Region: Volta Region
- District: Agortime-Ziope District
- Major Towns: Ziope and Agortime-Kpetoe
- Elevation: 230 ft (70 m)
- Time zone: GMT
  - Summer (DST): GMT

Agortime-Kpetoe (also known simply as Kpetoe) is a small town and is the capital of Agortime Ziope District, a district in the Volta Region of Ghana. It is currently in the Agortime-Ziope District and the town is known for its cross-border trades and kente culture.

== Infrastructure ==
The town has a bridge called the Kpetoe Bridge and a river called River Tordze which gets its source from Hanyigbatodzi in Togo.

The town has a market called the Kpetoe Market.

== History ==
In 2017, the town had a sub-chief called Nene Akoto-Sai VII.

The Agortime Traditional Area had a Paramount Chief by name Nene Nuer Keteku who reigned for over 50 years.

In 2022, the Paramount Chief of Agortime-Kpetoe was Nene Nuer Keteku IV.

== Geography ==
=== Location ===
Agortime-Kpetoe lies about 23 kilometres south east of Ho, the regional capital.

== External links and sources ==
- Adaklu-Anyigbe District on GhanaDistricts.com
- Kpetoe demographics
