= Juapong =

Town in the Volta Region, Ghana

(Duampon)Juapong North Tongu
- Town
- Location within Ghana
- Coordinates: 6.25°N 0.14°E
- Country: Ghana
- Region: Eastern Region
- District: Asuogyaman District
- Time zone: GMT
  - Summer (DST): GMT

Juapong is a town within Dorfor jurisdictions in the Volta Region of Ghana. It was one of the biggest employer in the Volta Region.The MP for Juapong is Hon. Samuel Okudzeto Ablakwa.
