= Adafienu =

Coordinates: 6°04′N 1°07′E

- Town
- Interactive map of Adafienu
- Country: Ghana
- Region: Volta Region
- District: Ketu South Municipal

Adafienu is a coastal community located in the Volta Region of Ghana near Denu. Citizens of Adefienu are noted for fishing in the Atlantic Ocean, in May 2007 the fishermen caught a large fish measuring 4.2 metres long, 1.2 metres wide a meter high.

== Notable people ==
- Seth Anthony
