= Akatsi =

Akatsi Mornenu
- District capital
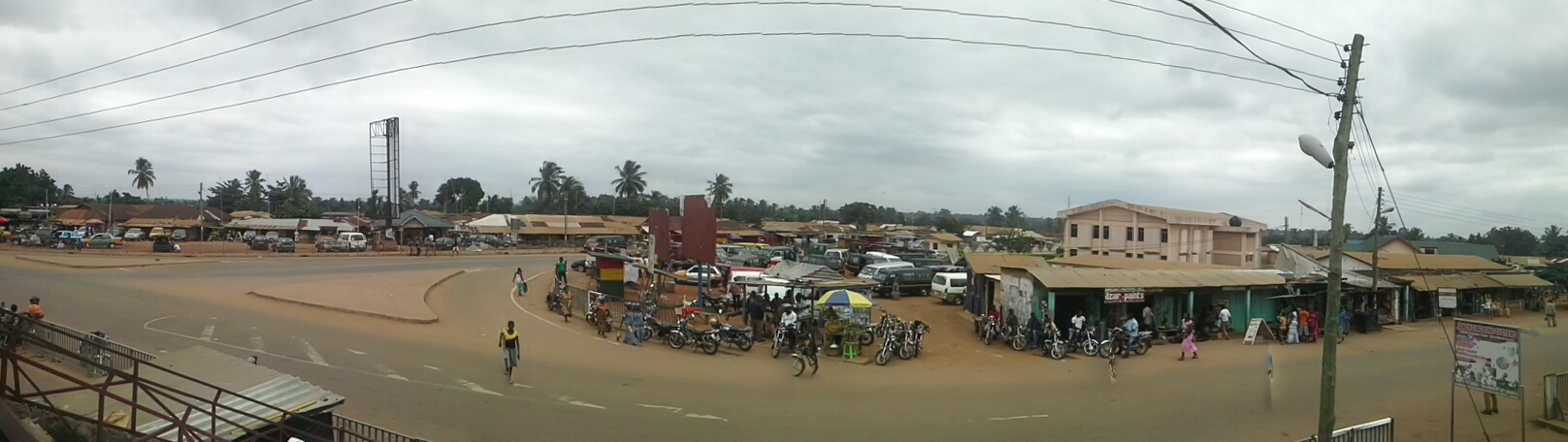
- Aerial view of roads leading to Accra, Dzodze and Aflao (from left)

- Location in Ghana
- Coordinates: 06°07′51.68″N 00°47′53.56″E
- Country: Ghana
- Region: Volta Region
- District: Akatsi South District
- Time zone: GMT
  - Summer (DST): GMT
- Area code: 0966

Akatsi is a small town and is the capital of Akatsi South Municipality, a municipality in the Volta Region of Ghana.

== Economy ==
Economic activities in Akatsi are mainly Subsistence agriculture coupled with vibrant buying and selling. Smuggling of clothing from Lomé in Togo through Aflao (the south-eastern border town of Ghana) to Accra. The trans-West Africa highway linking Lomé to Accra through Akatsi also aids an active male dominated transportation business in Akatsi.

== Demographic ==
The inhabitants of Akatsi are Avenor Ewes and the main languages of any social and economic interaction are Ewe and French. The Ewe settled in the area after the exodus of Ewe tribe from Notsie in Togo to this area in the seventeenth century.

== Education ==
Akatsi is home to the teacher training educational institution Akatsi College of Education, which includes over 700 students and has achieved a good reputation in the area for educating tutors.

== Climate ==
Climate data for Akatsi (1991–2020)
Month	Jan	Feb	Mar	Apr	May	Jun	Jul	Aug	Sep	Oct	Nov	Dec	Year
Record high °C (°F)	38.0 (100.4)	38.7 (101.7)	37.8 (100.0)	38.0 (100.4)	37.5 (99.5)	36.0 (96.8)	34.2 (93.6)	36.6 (97.9)	34.7 (94.5)	35.5 (95.9)	36.0 (96.8)	36.0 (96.8)	38.7 (101.7)
Mean daily maximum °C (°F)	34.0 (93.2)	35.0 (95.0)	34.4 (93.9)	33.7 (92.7)	32.5 (90.5)	30.5 (86.9)	29.4 (84.9)	29.5 (85.1)	30.8 (87.4)	31.9 (89.4)	33.0 (91.4)	33.5 (92.3)	32.4 (90.3)
Daily mean °C (°F)	28.7 (83.7)	29.9 (85.8)	29.7 (85.5)	29.3 (84.7)	28.4 (83.1)	27.0 (80.6)	26.2 (79.2)	26.1 (79.0)	27.0 (80.6)	27.7 (81.9)	28.4 (83.1)	28.7 (83.7)	28.1 (82.6)
Mean daily minimum °C (°F)	23.5 (74.3)	24.8 (76.6)	25.0 (77.0)	24.8 (76.6)	24.3 (75.7)	23.6 (74.5)	23.0 (73.4)	22.5 (72.5)	23.1 (73.6)	23.4 (74.1)	23.8 (74.8)	23.7 (74.7)	23.8 (74.8)
Record low °C (°F)	18.0 (64.4)	18.3 (64.9)	20.0 (68.0)	20.5 (68.9)	20.4 (68.7)	20.4 (68.7)	19.5 (67.1)	19.5 (67.1)	20.5 (68.9)	20.0 (68.0)	19.5 (67.1)	17.0 (62.6)	17.0 (62.6)
Average precipitation mm (inches)	13.5 (0.53)	25.6 (1.01)	83.7 (3.30)	94.2 (3.71)	176.2 (6.94)	153.5 (6.04)	56.2 (2.21)	31.6 (1.24)	91.0 (3.58)	120.2 (4.73)	73.4 (2.89)	28.8 (1.13)	947.9 (37.32)
Average precipitation days (≥ 1.0 mm)	1.0	2.2	4.8	5.3	9.5	9.5	4.8	3.3	7.3	8.8	6.5	2.3	65.3
Source: NOAA
