= Adaklu Waya =

Adaklu Waya Aɖaklu Waya
- District Capital
- Location in Ghana
- Coordinates: 6°26′41″N 0°37′43″E
- Country: Ghana
- Region: Volta Region
- Districts: Adaklu District

Government
  - District Chief Executive: Phanuel Donkor Kadey
- Elevation: 73 m (240 ft)
- Time zone: GMT
  - Summer (DST): GMT
- Area code: +233 36 20

Adaklu Waya is the capital of the Adaklu District. It is one of the districts of the Volta Region, Ghana.

== History ==
According to oral traditions and regional histories, the expansion of Adaklu territory involved prominent local figures and resistance against external influences. Local stories highlight the preservation of African cultural identity in the face of colonial or regional conflicts.

== Geography ==
The history of this town is based specifically on the African nature of power and settlement and of territories they acquired.

== Location ==
Adaklu Waya is located in the Volta Region and it's the main district to Adaklu towns.
