= South Tongu District =

South Tongu District Tongu Sud
- District
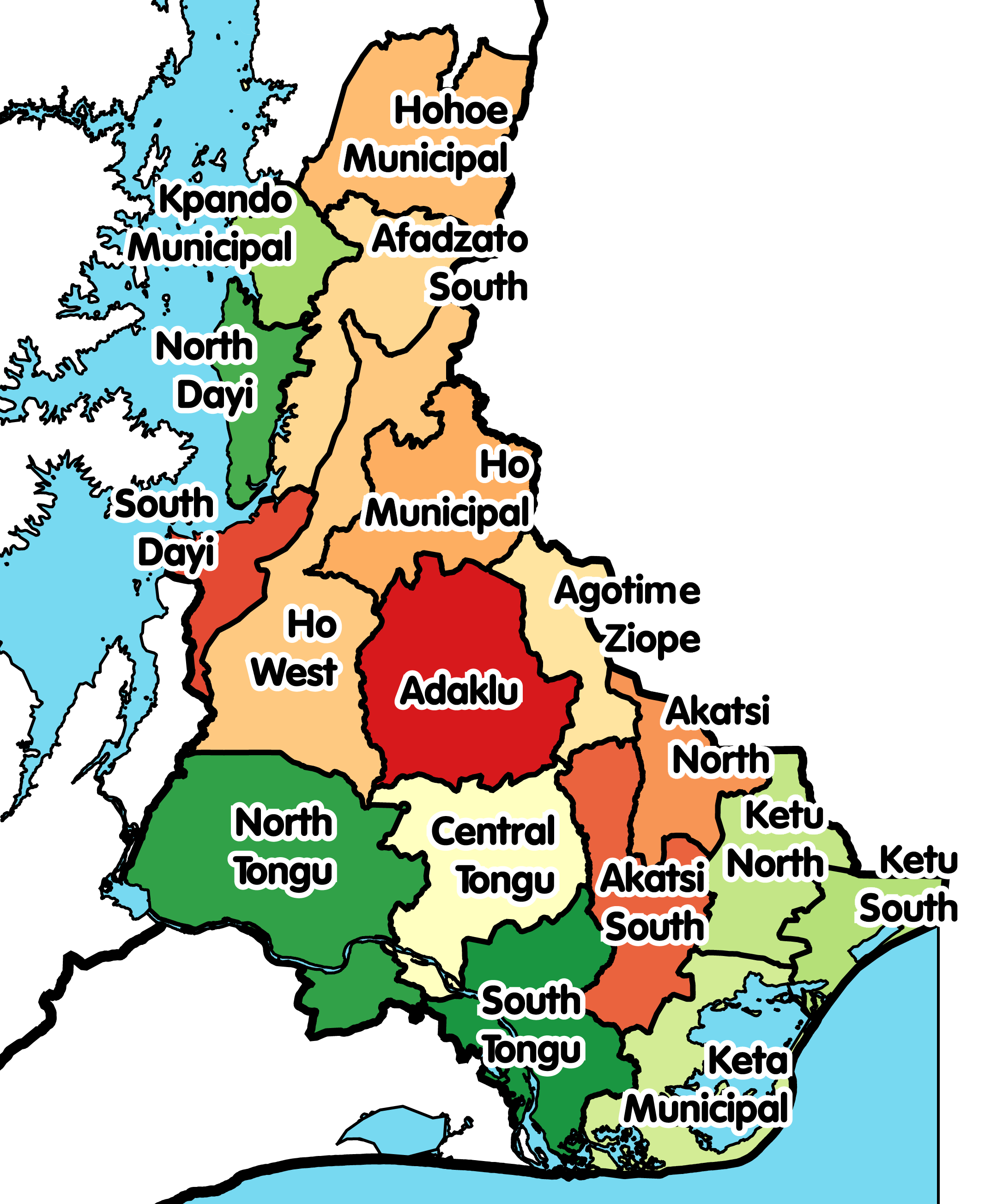
- Districts of Volta Region

- Location of South Tongu District within Volta
- Coordinates: 6°0′0.36″N 0°35′56.76″E
- Country: Ghana
- Region: Volta
- Capital: Sogakope

Government
  - District Executive: Hon. Emmanuel Louise Agamah

Area
  - Total: 623 km^{2} (241 sq mi)

Population (2021)
  - Total: 113,114
  - Density: 182/km^{2} (470/sq mi)
- Time zone: UTC+0 (GMT)
- ISO 3166 code: GH-TV-ST

South Tongu District is one of the eighteen districts in Volta Region, Ghana. Originally created as an ordinary district assembly on 10 March 1989, which was created from the former Tongu District Council, which was established by Legislative Instrument (L.I.) 1466. The district assembly is located in the southwest part of Volta Region and has Sogakope as its capital town.

== Geography ==
There are many streams in South Tongu District. The prominent ones are the Chinni and the Todzi. The Volta River runs to the west of this district.

== Boundaries ==
South Tongu District is bounded by:

- the Lake Volta to the west and south west,
- North Tongu District to the north-west,
- Akatsi South District to the north-east, and
- Keta District to the south.
