= Agotime-Ziope District =

District in Volta Region, Ghana

- District
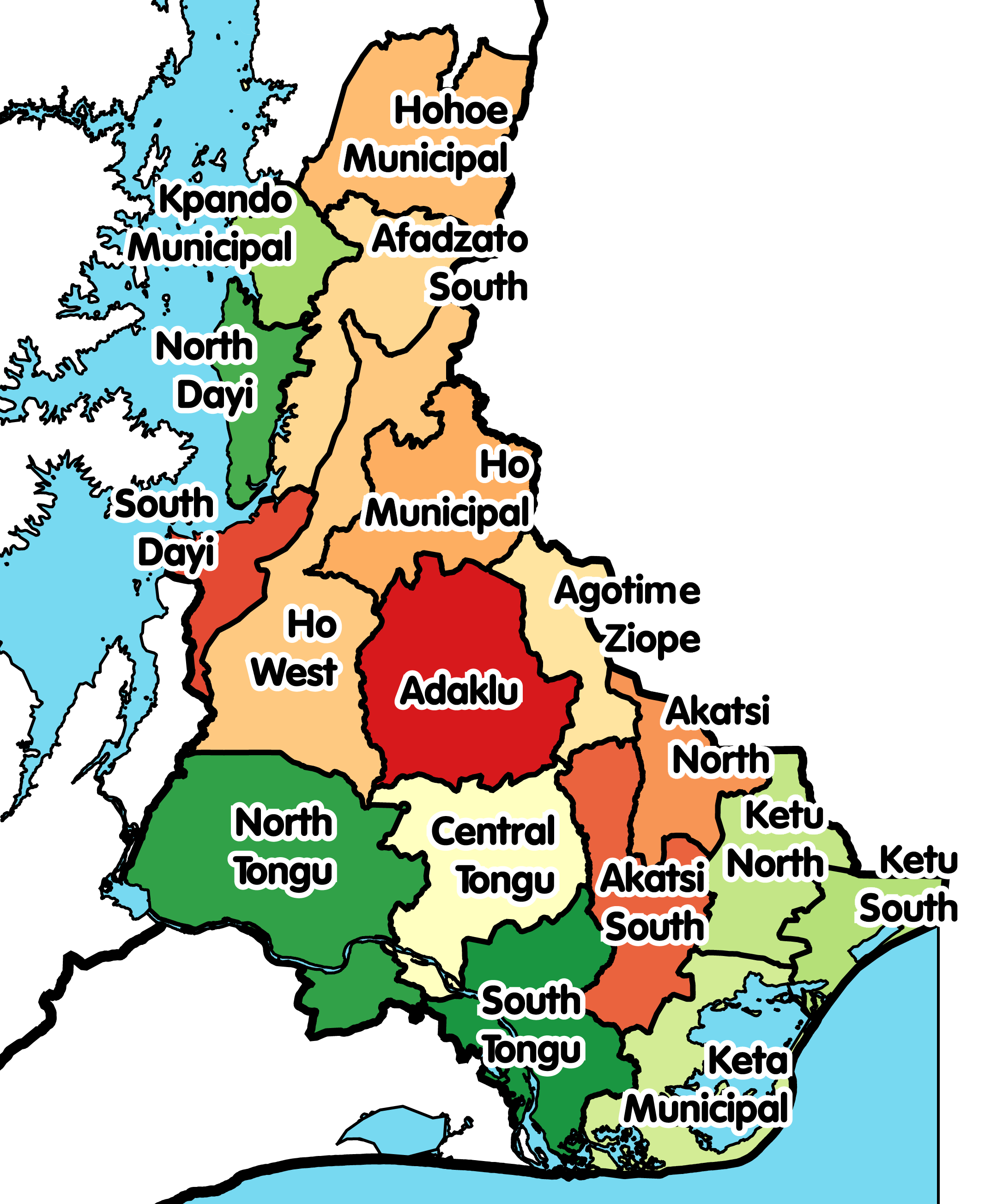
- Districts of Volta Region

- Location of Agotime-Ziope District within Volta
- Coordinates: 6°32′59.28″N 0°41′42.36″E
- Country: Ghana
- Region: Volta
- Capital: Agortime-Kpetoe

Government
  - District Executive: Hon. Ms Emilia Emefa Adzimah

Area
  - Total: 3,200 km^{2} (1,200 sq mi)

Population (2021)
  - Total: 39,553
  - Density: 12/km^{2} (32/sq mi)
- Time zone: UTC+0 (GMT)
- ISO 3166 code: GH-TV-AZ

Agotime-Ziope District is one of the eighteen districts in Volta Region, Ghana. Originally it was part of the then-larger Adaklu-Anyigbe District on 13 August 2004, until the western part of the district was split off to create Adaklu District on 28 June 2012; thus the remaining part has been renamed as Agotime-Ziope District (under the then-president John Atta Mills government). The district assembly is located in the central part of Volta Region and has Agortime-Kpetoe as its capital town.

== Political and administrative structure ==
The Agotime-Ziope District is governed by a District Assembly, which serves as the highest political and administrative authority in the district. The assembly is responsible for local governance, development planning, and service delivery. It is headed by a District Chief Executive, who is appointed by the President of Ghana, along with elected and appointed members representing various communities within the district.

== List of settlements ==
=== Some of the settlements in the district include: ===
| No | settlement | population | population year |
|---|---|---|---|
| 1 | sokode | 200,767 | 2012 |
| 2 | kpetoe | 309,789 | 2012 |
