= Ho Municipal Assembly =

Municipal Assembly in Ghana

Ho Municipal District
- Municipal in Volta Region of Ghana
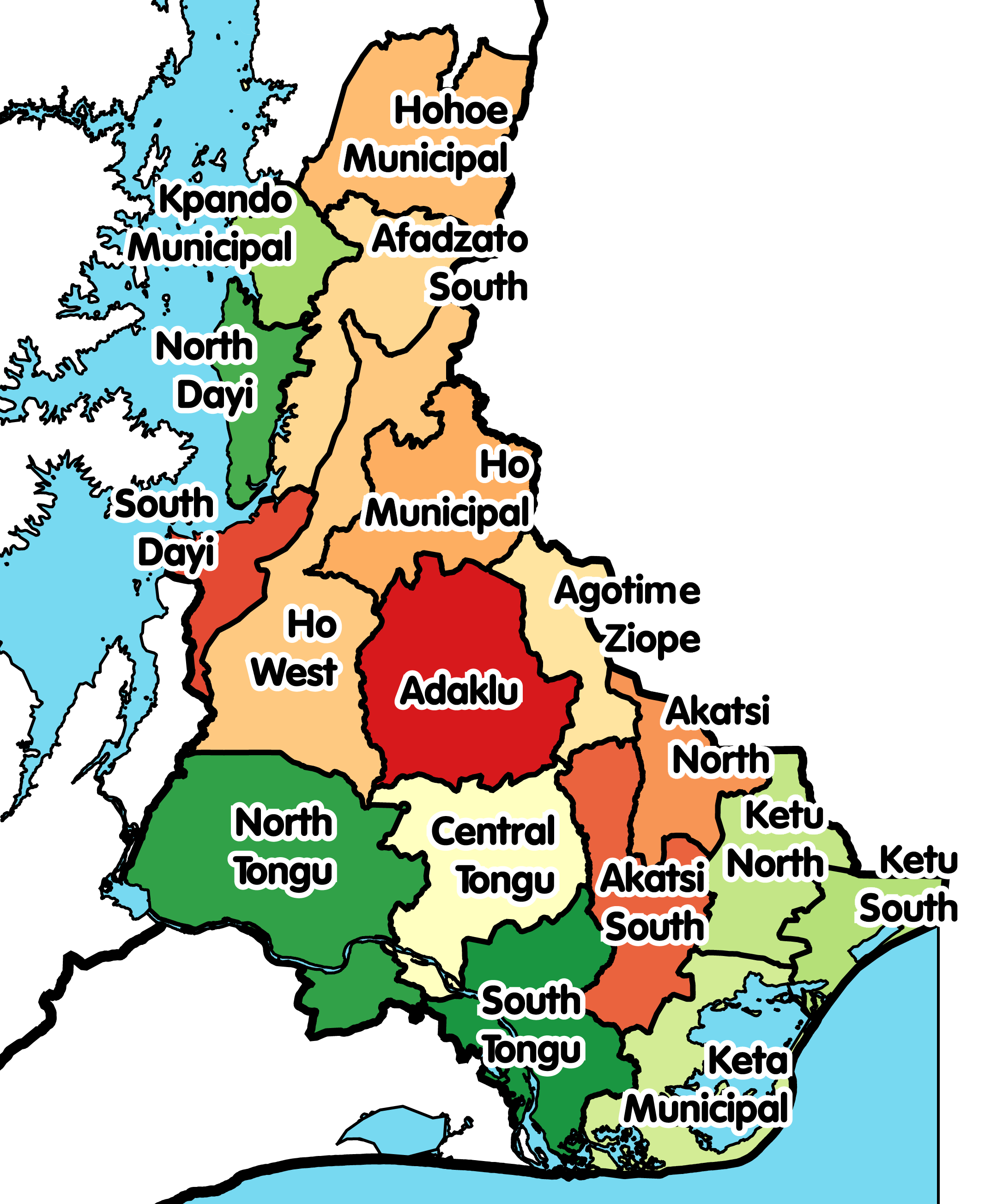
- Districts of Volta Region

- Location of Ho Municipal District within Volta
- Coordinates: 6°36′43″N 0°28′13″E
- Country: Ghana
- Region: Volta
- Capital: Ho

Government
  - Municipal Chief Executive: Hon. Prosper Pi Bansa

Area
  - Total: 573.2 km^{2} (221.3 sq mi)

Population (2021 census)
  - Total: 180,420
  - Density: 314.8/km^{2} (815.2/sq mi)
- Time zone: UTC+0 (GMT)
- ISO 3166 code: GH-TV-HO

Ho Municipal Assembly is one of the 25 administrative Districts in the Volta Region, Ghana. It is made up of total land size of 2,361 km2 and a total estimated population of 213,960 in 2017, 105,195 being males and 108,765 are females. Originally created as an ordinary district assembly on 10 March 1989 when it was known as Ho District, until the southern part of the district was split off by a decree of president John Agyekum Kufuor on 13 August 2004 to create Adaklu-Anyigbe District; thus the remaining part has been retained as Ho District. However on 28 June 2012, the western part of the district was later split off to create Ho West District; thus the remaining part was elevated to municipal district assembly status on that same year to become Ho Municipal Assembly, which was established by Legislative Instrument (L.I.) 2074. The municipality is located in the central part of Volta Region and has Ho as its capital town.

== Population ==
As of 2021, the population of Ho was 180, 420 with 84,843 males and 95,577 females.

Various buildings in Ho.

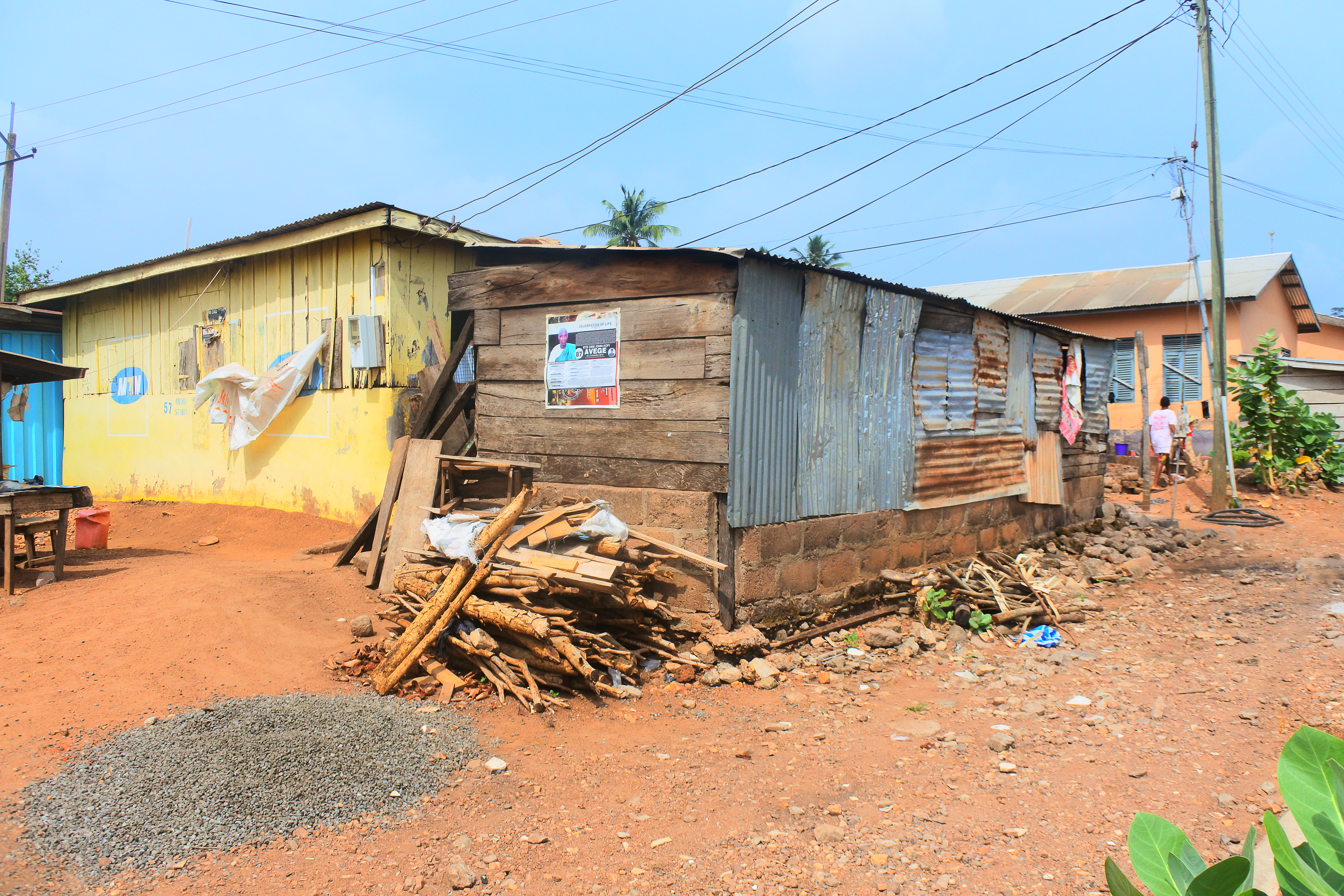

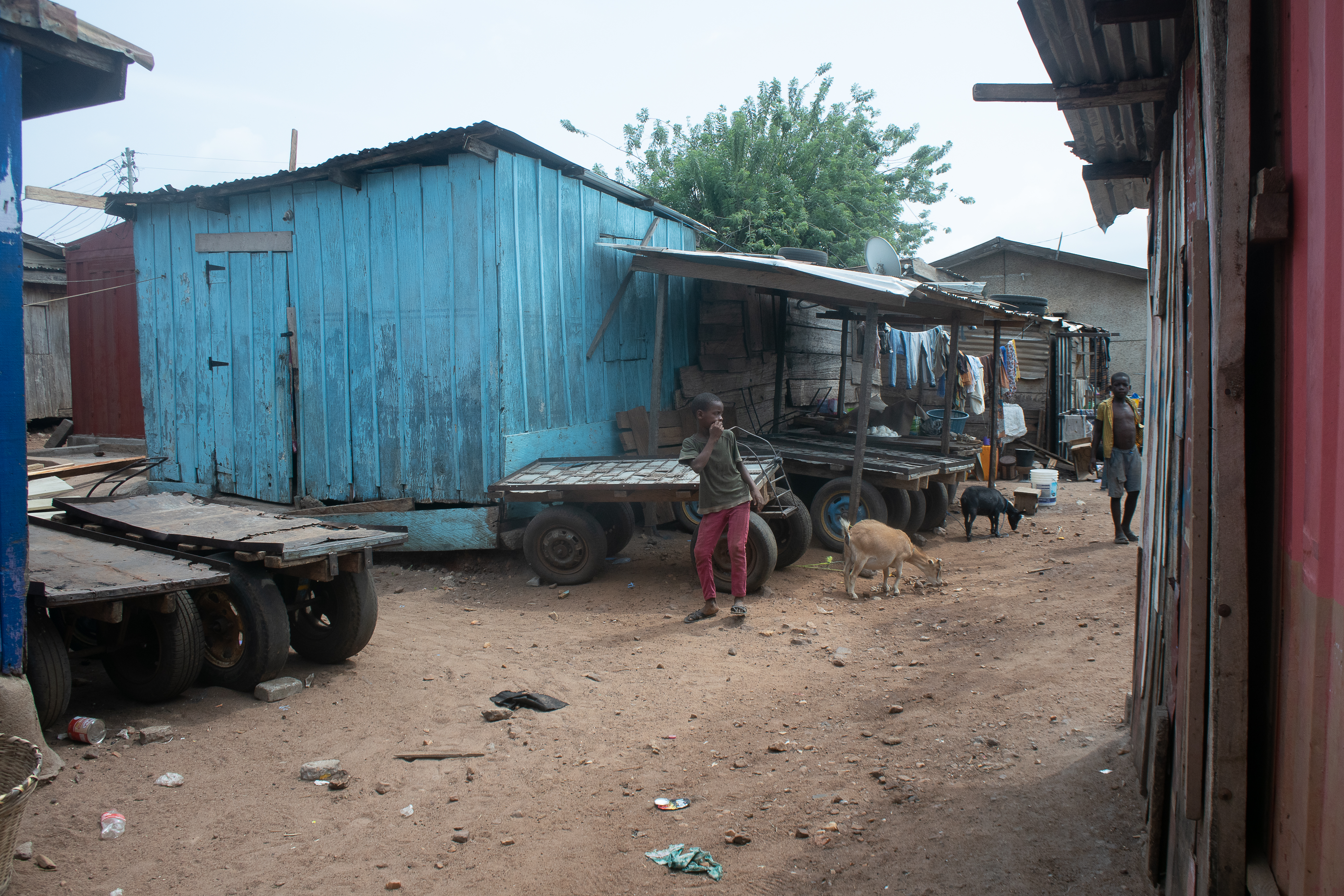

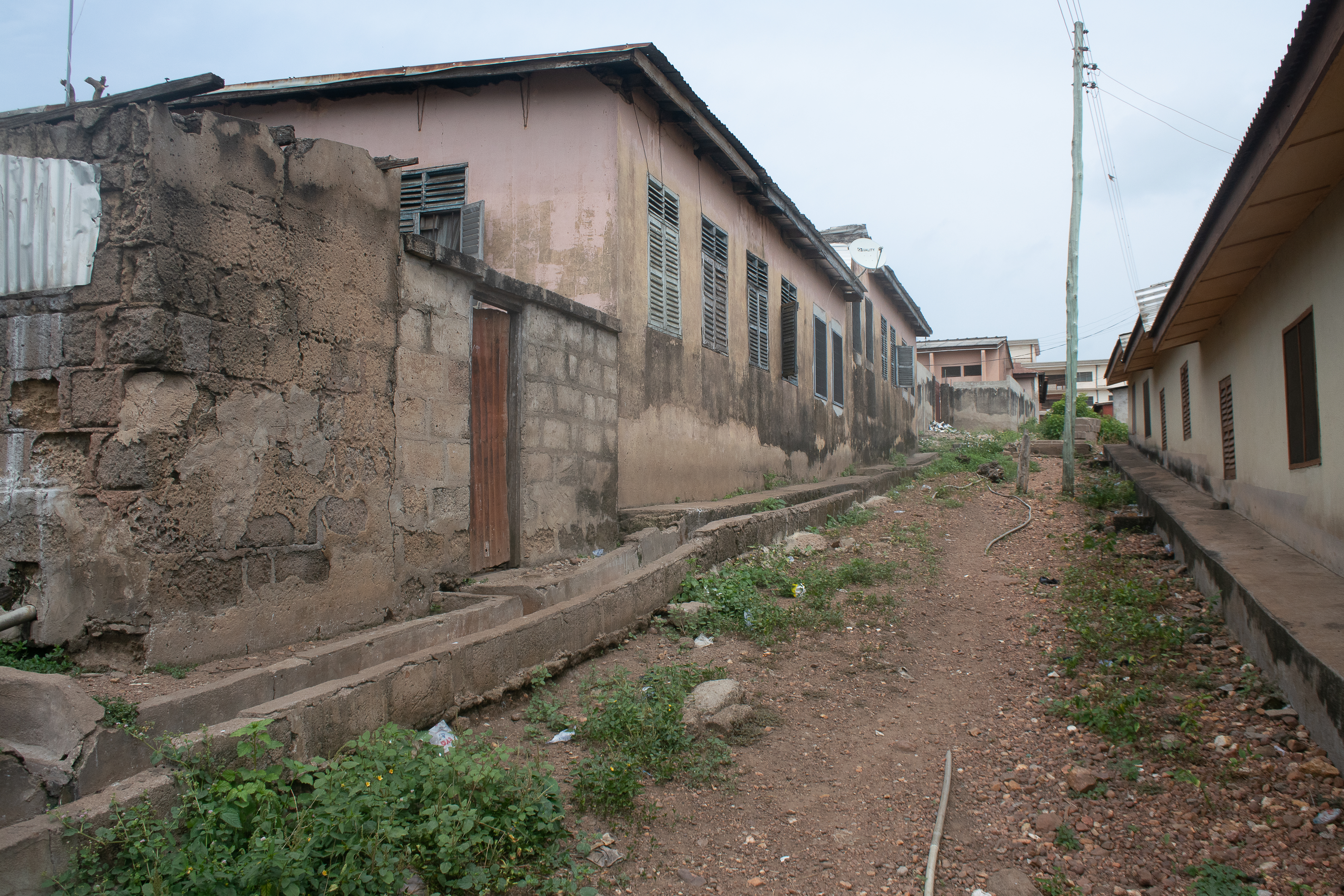

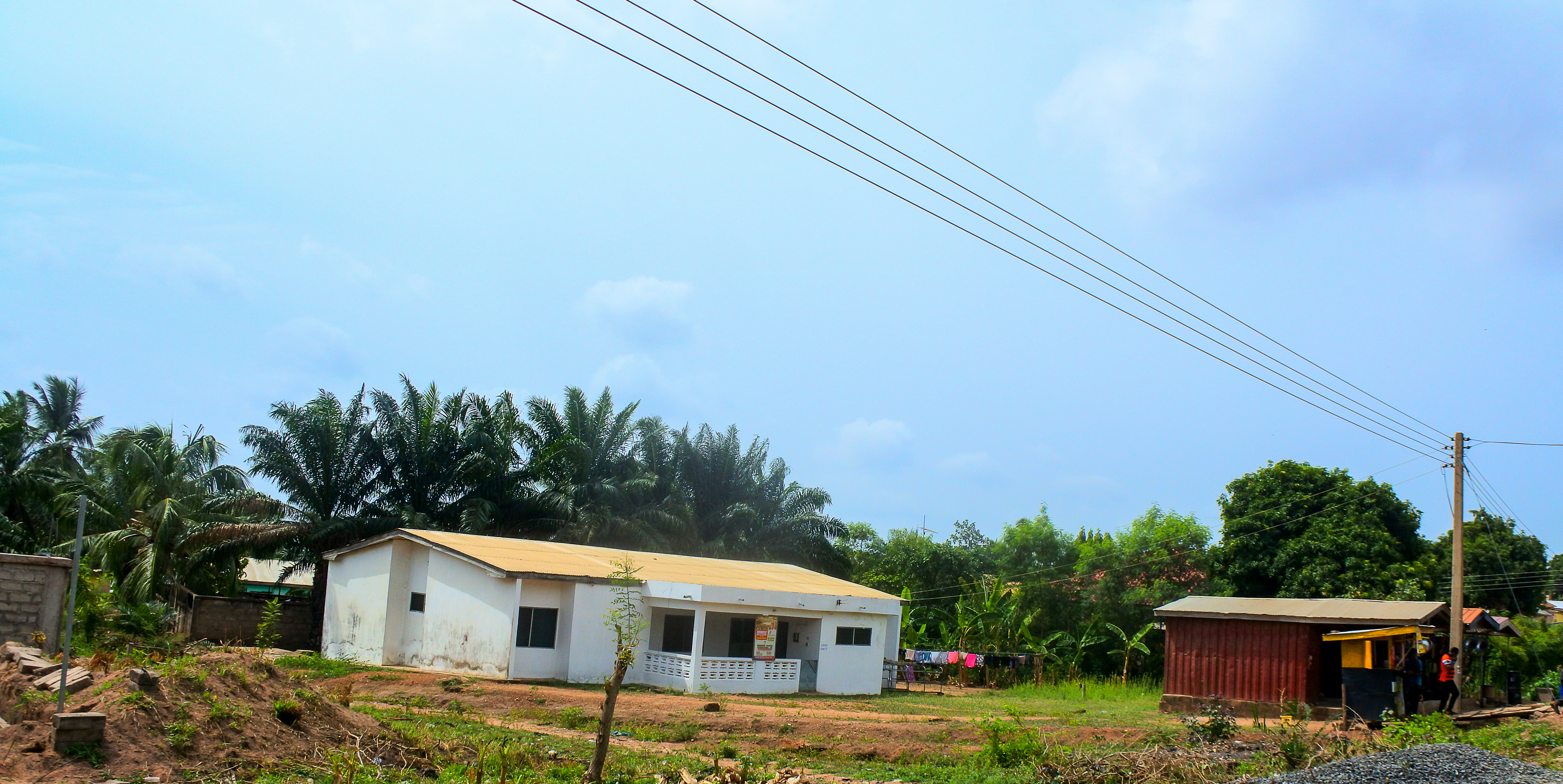

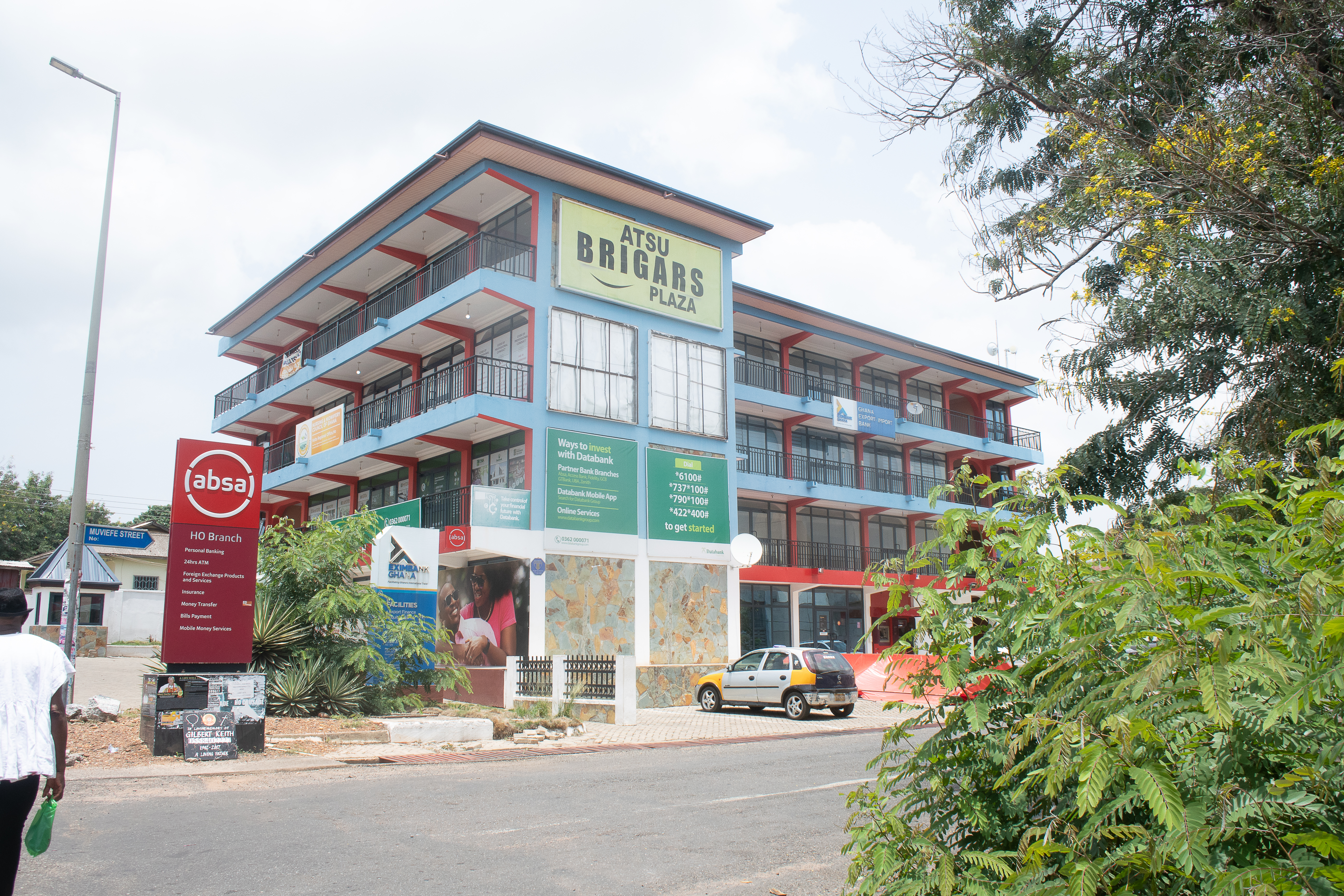

== History ==
The district's capital Ho arose initially from a union of two villages namely, Banakoe (today Bankoe) and Hegbe (today Heve).

== Universities in Ho ==
Ho boasts of two public universities namely:

- University of Health and Allied Sciences
- Ho Technical University Formerly known as Ho Poly.

There are several private universities also they include:

- Evangelical Presbyterian University College
- Ghana Communication Technology University

There are several Nurses Training College, Ho Nurses' Training College.

== Villages ==
In addition to Ho, the capital and administrative center, Ho Municipal Assembly contains the following villages:

- Abutia-Kloe
- Abutia-Teti
- Akoeƒe
- Amedzoƒe
- Anyirawase
- Asanti-Kpoeta
- Atikpui
- Dededo
- Dzolo-Gbogame
- Hovieƒe
- Kleƒe Achatime
- Kpenoe
- Shia
- Sokode Gbogame
- Sokode Etoe
- Sokode Bagble
- Sokode Ando
- Sokode Lokoe
- Takla Gbogame
- Tavieƒe
- Tanyigbe
- Tsibu
- Ziavi-Dzogbe
- Ziavi-Lume
- Ziavi-Adukofe
- Adaklu
