= Adidome =

- District Capital
- Location of Adidome in Ghana
- Coordinates: 06°04′26.66″N 00°29′59.25″E
- Country: Ghana
- Region: Volta Region
- District: Central Tongu District
- Elevation: 51 m (167 ft)

Population (2010)
  - Total: 7,587
- Time zone: GMT
  - Summer (DST): GMT
- Area code: +233 36 26

Adidome is a small town and is the capital of Central Tongu district, a district in the Volta Region of Ghana. According to the Ghana Statistical Service 2010 Population and Housing Census, the population of Adidome was 7,587. The distance from Adidome to Ghana's capital, Accra is approximately 144 km. The town has a Senior High School called Adidome Senior High School. Adidome is not only noted for its Senior High School but also the Adidome Farm Institute.

The new chief known as Togbe Kwasinyi Kakaklolo Agyeman V, was installed in June 2023

== Geography ==
The Volta River flows close to Adidome on its way into the Atlantic Ocean.

== See also ==
- North Tongu (Ghana parliament constituency)
- Akatsi College of Education (closest educational institution)
- Adidome Farm Institute
- Adidome Senior High Secondary School

== External links and sources ==
- GhanaDistricts
