= Adaklu District =

District in Volta Region, Ghana

- District
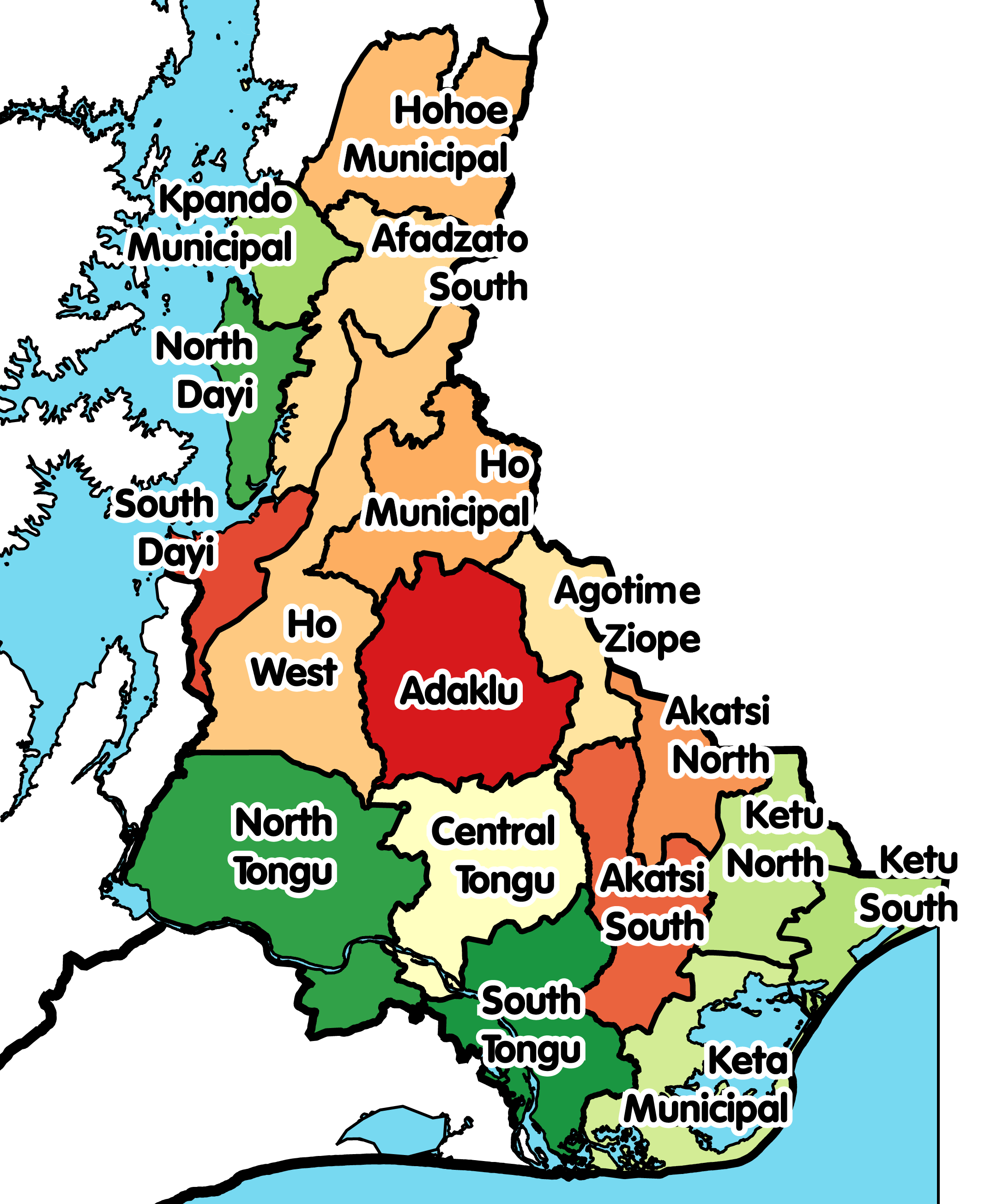
- Districts of Volta Region

- Location of Adaklu District within Volta
- Coordinates: 6°41′1″N 00°20′1″E
- Country: Ghana
- Region: Volta
- Capital: Adaklu Waya

Government
  - District Executive: Walter Wogbemase Zulu

Area
  - Total: 4,000 km^{2} (1,500 sq mi)

Population (2021)
  - Total: 38,649
  - Density: 9.7/km^{2} (25/sq mi)
- Time zone: UTC+0 (GMT)
- ISO 3166 code: GH-TV-AK

Adaklu District is one of the eighteen districts in Volta Region, Ghana. It was formerly part of the then-larger Adaklu-Anyigbe District since 13 August 2004. This was until the western part of the district was split off to create Adaklu District on 28 June 2012 with the other part of the old district renamed as Agotime-Ziope District (under the then-president John Atta Mills government). The district assembly is located in the central part of Volta Region and has Adaklu Waya as its capital town.

== Administration ==
The district is headed by a District Chief Executive appointed by the President of Ghana in consultation with the local District Assembly. The Assembly consists of elected representatives. The district is represented in the parliament of Ghana by the Member of Parliament for the Adaklu constituency whose boundaries coincide with that of the district.

== Education ==
The district is known for the Gbekor Senior High School at Adaklu-Abuadi and Adaklu Senior High School at Adaklu-Waya.
