= Akatsi South District =

Akatsi South Municipal Akatsi-Sud
- District
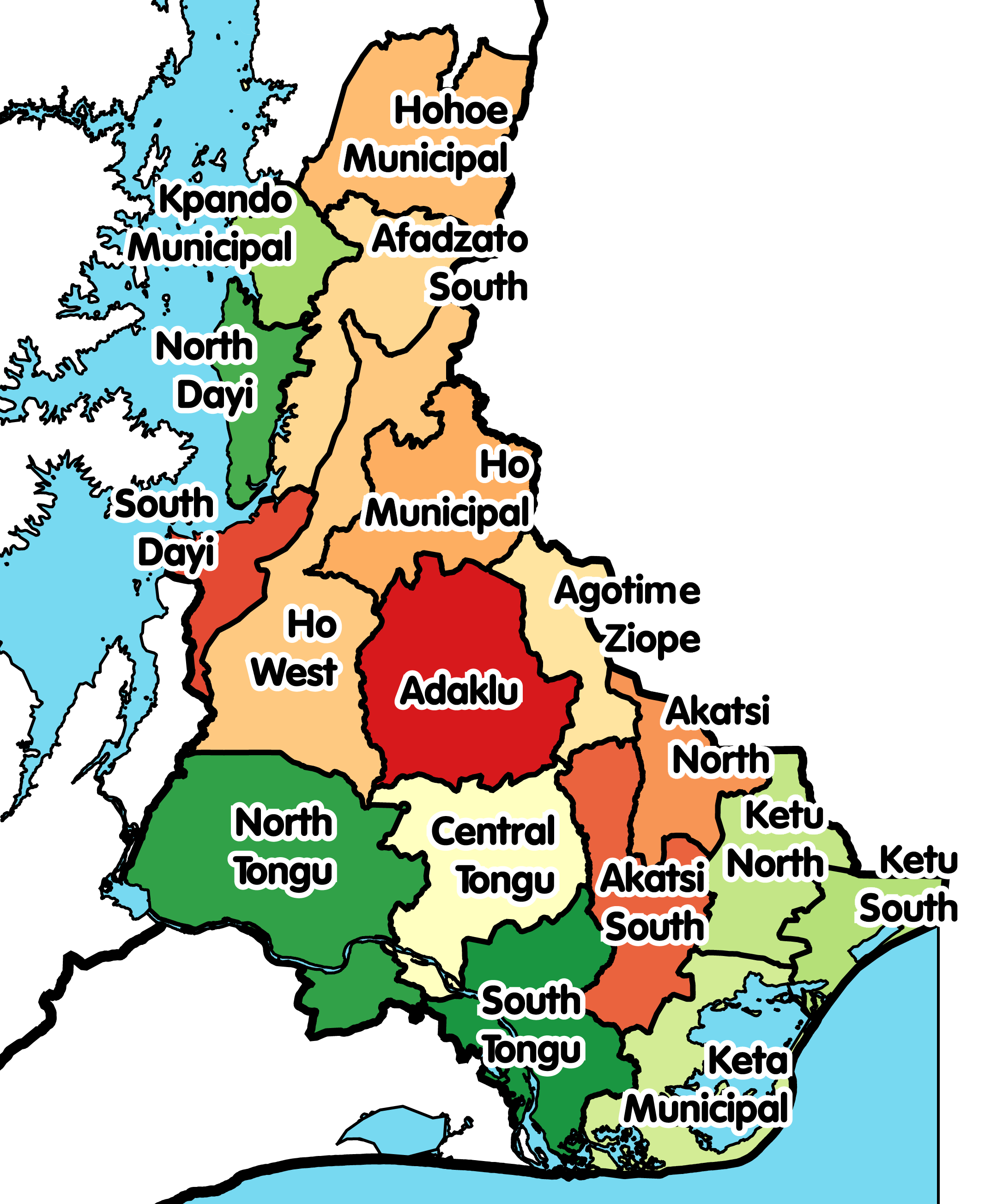
- Districts of Volta Region

- Location of Akatsi South Municipal within Volta
- Coordinates: 6°7′51.68″N 0°47′53.56″E
- Country: Ghana
- Region: Volta
- Capital: Akatsi

Government
  - District Executive: Hon.

Area
  - Total: 448 km^{2} (173 sq mi)

Population (2021)
  - Total: 92,494
- Time zone: UTC+0 (GMT)
- ISO 3166 code: GH-TV-AS

Akatsi South Municipal is one of eighteen districts in Volta Region, Ghana. Originally it was part of the then-larger Akatsi District created on 10th March, 1989. The Akatsi South Municipal was created from the former Anlo District Council, until the northern part of the district was split off to create Akatsi North District on 28 June 2012; under the government by then-president John Atta Mills. Thus the remaining part has been renamed as Akatsi South District.

The District shares boundaries with Keta and Anloga District to the South, Ketu North to the East, to the West by South and Central Tongu Districts and to the North by Akatsi North and Agortime-Ziope Districts. Its total land area is about 536 square kilometers. The District capital, Akatsi is approximately 80 km southeastern from the regional capital, Ho and about 140 km from the national capital, Accra.

== Elevation from District to a Municipal status ==
Akatsi South District was officially elevated to a municipality on October 5, 2020, when Legislative Instrument (LI) 2420 was passed by the Ghanaian parliament and signed into law by President Nana Akufo-Addo. The elevation was a result of the municipality's economic and social development, as well as its strategic location in the Volta Region.

The Akatsi South District has a political and administrative structure. The political structure consists of a General Assembly with a membership of forty (40) members, comprising twenty-eight (28) elected members and twelve (12) government appointees. There are three (3) Area Councils, a Town Council, and twenty-eight (28) Unit Committees.

The Councils are:

- Avenorpeme Area Council
- Wute Area Council
- Gefia Area Council
- Akatsi Town Council
