= Volta Region =

Region of Ghana

Coordinates: 7°00′N 0°30′E

Volta Region Région de la Volta Amuga Nutome
- Region
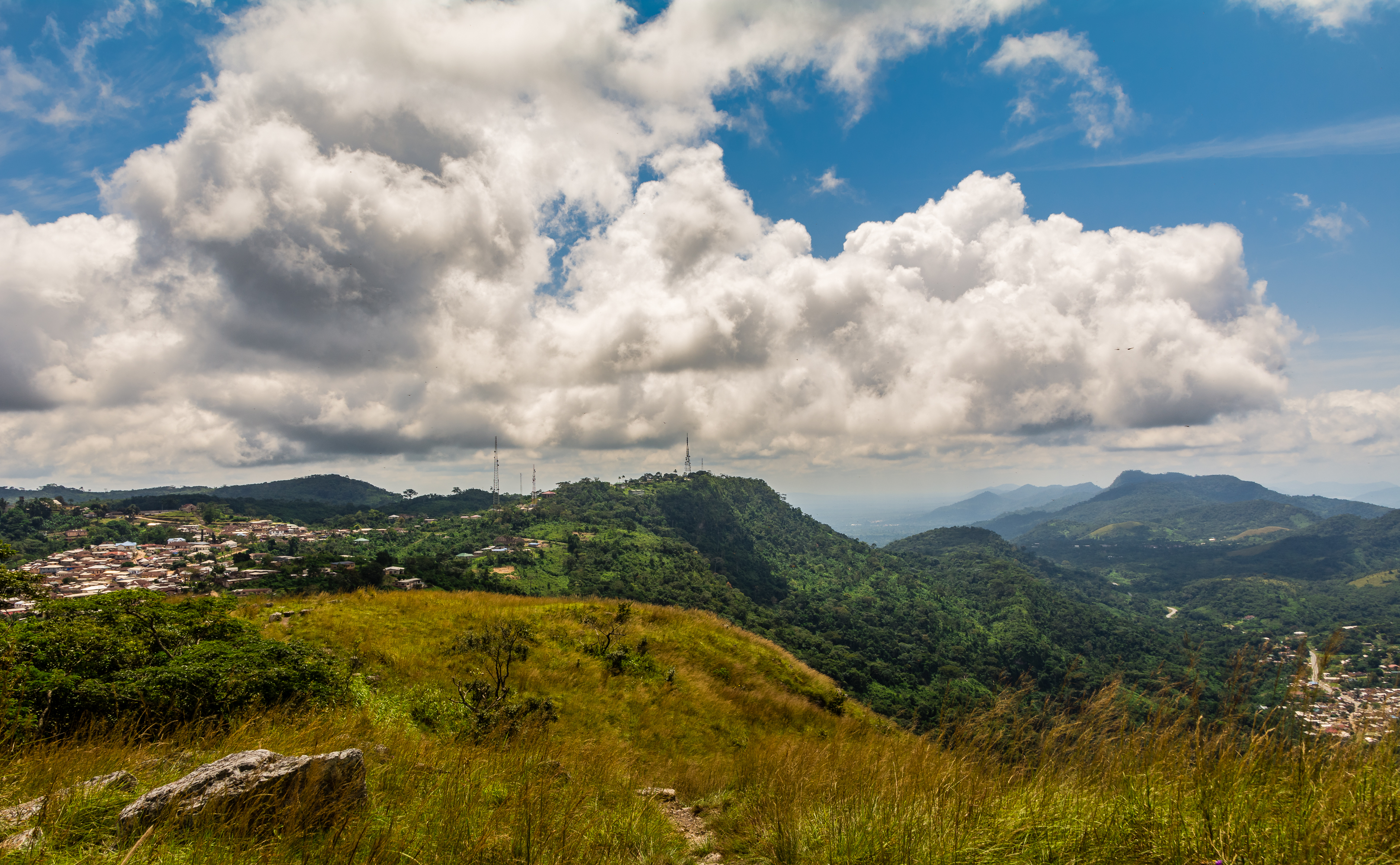

- Location of Volta in Ghana
- Country: Ghana
- Capital: Ho
- Districts: 18

Government
  - Regional Minister: James Gunu

Area
  - Total: 9,504 km^{2} (3,670 sq mi)
  - Rank: Ranked 12th

Population (2021 Census)
  - Total: 1,659,040
  - Rank: Ranked 7th
  - Density: 174.6/km^{2} (452.1/sq mi)

GDP (PPP)
  - Year: 2014
  - Per capita: $3,974

GDP (Nominal)
  - Year: 2014
  - Per capita: $1,902
- Time zone: GMT
- Area code: 036
- ISO 3166 code: GH-TV
- HDI (2022): 0.625 medium · 7th
- Website: voltaregion.gov.gh

Volta Region (or Volta) is one of Ghana's sixteen administrative regions, with Ho designated as its capital. Other major towns in the region include Anloga, Keta, Hohoe, Aflao, Sogakope, Akatsi, Juapong, Denu and many others. It is located in the eastern part of Republic of Ghana. Divided into 18 administrative districts, the region is multi-ethnic and multilingual, including groups such as the Ewe, the Guan, Ga-Adangme, Akan people, Hausa and other minority groups. The Guan peoples, prior to the creation of the Oti Region included the Lolobi, Likpe, Akpafu, Akyode, Buem, Nyagbo, Avatime (located in the Agortime-Ziope district, remains an integral part of the Volta Region) and Nkonya.

The people of the Volta Region are popularly known as Voltarians (French: Voltaiens). This group includes the Ewes, Guans and other minor tribes living in the Volta Region. The people of the Volta Region are popular known for their rich cultural display and music some of which include Agbadza, Borborbor and Zigi.

== Background ==
British Togoland in pale green (French Togoland in pale purple)

The Volta region was formed by the state union of the former British Togoland which had been part of the German protectorate of Togoland. It was administered as part of the Gold Coast by the British and later renamed Trans-Volta Togoland.

== Demographics ==
The native and largest ethnic group of the Volta Region are the Ewe people (68.5% of the population). They consist of several subgroups such as the Anlo Ewe, Tongu Ewe, Wedome Ewe, Ave Ewe and Avenor Ewe. Other ethnicities include the Guan people (forming 9.2% of the population), the Akan people (8.5%), and the Gurma people (6.5% of the population). The main languages of the region are Ewe and English.

== Administration ==
The Volta region is run by a Regional Coordinating Council (RCC) and a District Assembly. The RCC is made up of the Volta Regional Minister who is the political head and his deputy as well as representatives of the Regional House of Chiefs, the District Chief Executives of the Volta region, the Presiding Members of the 12 Districts Assemblies and representatives of the various decentralized Ministries, Departments and Agencies in the Volta region. Each district is run by a District Assembly.

=== Regional Commissioners and Ministers ===
The current Regional Minister, James Gunu was appointed in January 2025.

== Administrative divisions ==
Before the regional demarcation in December 2018, the region had 25 MMDA's (made up of 0 Metropolitan, 5 Municipal and 20 Ordinary Assemblies) with all the administrative changes as of December 2012. After the census, the Oti Region was carved out of it, reducing the size of the region and the number of administrative districts to 18.

The political administration of the region is through the local government system. Under this administration system, the region is divided into 18 MMDA's (made up of 0 Metropolitan, 6 Municipal and 12 Ordinary Assemblies). Each District, Municipal or Metropolitan Assembly, is administered by a Chief Executive, representing the central government but deriving authority from an Assembly headed by a presiding member elected from among the members themselves. The current list is as follows:

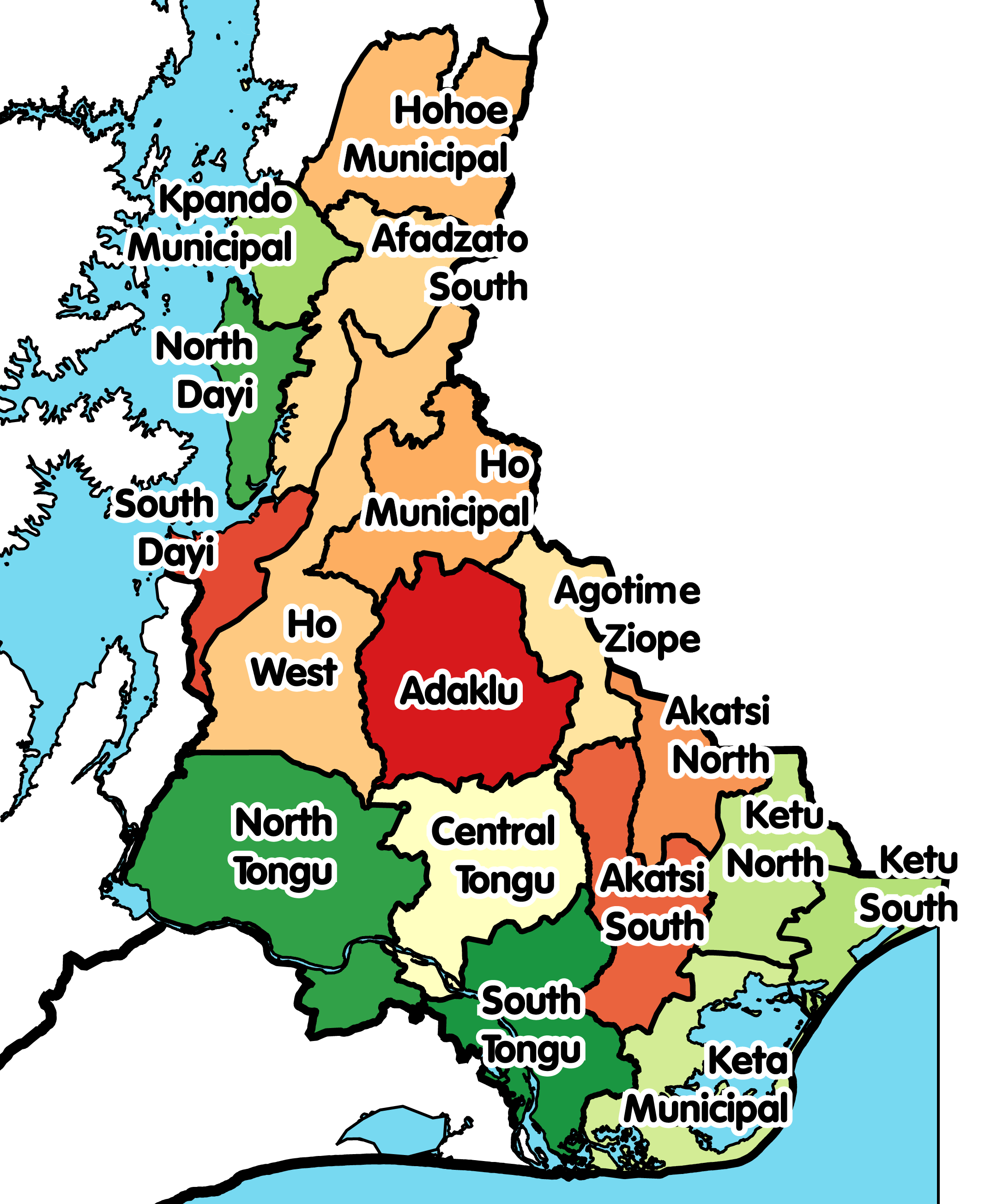
Districts of the Volta Region

Districts of the Volta Region
#	MMDA Name	Capital	MMDA Type	Chief Executive	Start date	Constituency	Member of Parliament	Party
1	Adaklu	Adaklu Waya	Ordinary	Jerry Yaw Ameko	2 April 2025	Adaklu	Kwame Governs Agbodza	NDC
2	Afadjato South	Ve Golokwati	Ordinary	Manfred Tawiah	4 April 2025	Afadjato South	Frank Afriyie	NDC
3	Agotime-Ziope	Kpetoe	Ordinary	Alfred Klu Odikro	2 April 2025	Agotime-Ziope	Charles Akwasi Agbeve	NDC
4	Akatsi North	Ave-Dakpa	Ordinary	Bless Kojo Katamani	2 April 2025	Akatsi North	Peter Kwasi Nortsu-Kotoe	NDC
5	Akatsi South	Akatsi	Ordinary	Daniel Dagba	1 June 2017	Akatsi South	Bernard Ahiafor	NDC
6	Anloga	Anloga	Municipal	Sandra Seyram Kpedor	15 May 2018	Anlo	Richard Kwami Sefe	NDC
7	Central Tongu	Adidome	Ordinary	Addison Dodzi Mornyuie	1 June 2017	Central Tongu	Alexander Roosevelt Hottordze	NDC
8	Ho	Ho	Municipal	Stephen Adom	1 June 2017	Ho Central	Richmond Edem Kofi Kpotosu	NDC
9	Ho West	Dzolokpuita	Ordinary	Prosper Francis Dussey	1 June 2017	Ho West	Emmanuel Kwasi Bedzrah	NDC
10	Hohoe	Hohoe	Municipal	Prosper Kumi	1 June 2017	Hohoe	Thomas Worlanyo Tsekpo	NDC
11	Keta	Keta	Municipal	Wisdom Bondieu Seade	1 June 2017	Keta	Kwame Dzudzorli Gakpey	NDC
12	Ketu North	Dzodze	Municipal	Martin Prince Korbla Amenaki	1 June 2017	Ketu North	Eric Edem Agbana	NDC
13	Ketu South	Denu	Municipal	Nicholas Kwabla Worclachie	1 June 2017	Ketu South	Dzifa Abla Gomashie	NDC
14	Kpando	Kpandu	Municipal	Killian Donkor	1 June 2017	Kpando	Sebastian Fred Deh	NDC
15	North Dayi	Anfoega	Ordinary	Ernest Adevor	1 June 2017	North Dayi	Joycelyn Tetteh	NDC
16	North Tongu	Battor Dugame	Ordinary	Victoria Amefadzi Yawa Doe	7 January 2017	North Tongu	Samuel Okudzeto Ablakwa	NDC
17	South Dayi	Kpeve New Town	Ordinary	Courage Kwame Kokroko	1 June 2017	South Dayi	Rockson-Nelson Kwami Dafeamekpor	NDC
18	South Tongu	Sogakope	Ordinary	Victoria Dzeklo	1 June 2017	South Tongu	Maxwell Kwame Lukutor	NDC

The following districts are now within the boundaries of the Oti Region which was formally created on 15 February 2019.

Districts of the Oti Region
#	MMDA Name	Capital	MMDA Type	Chief Executive
1	Biakoye	Nkonya Ahenkro	Ordinary	Comfort Attah
2	Jasikan	Jasikan	Ordinary	Lawrence Aziale
3	Kadjebi	Kadjebi	Ordinary	Michael Kofi Asiedu
4	Krachi East	Dambai	Municipal	Patrick Jilima
5	Krachi Nchumuru	Chinderi	Ordinary	Augustine Appiah
6	Krachi West	Kete Krachi	Ordinary	Douglas Osei-Nti
7	Nkwanta North	Kpassa	Ordinary	Jakayi Jackson
8	Nkwanta South	Nkwanta	Ordinary	John Tarsun

== Constituencies ==
There are 18 constituencies in the region after the Oti Region was carved out of it. Previously, Volta Region had 19 constituencies in the election in December 2000 and 24 constituencies in December 2004 parliamentary election. Four new constituencies were created by the Electoral Commission prior to the December 2012 parliamentary election, increasing the number of constituencies to 26.

== Education ==
=== Universities ===
- Ghana Telecom University College (Now Ghana Communication Technology University)
- University of Health and Allied Sciences
- Evangelical Presbyterian University College
- Ho Technical University
- Princefield University College
- Adonai University College

=== Nurses' Training and Colleges of Education ===
- Ho Nurses' Training College
- Keta Nursing and Midwifery Training College
- Hohoe Midwifery Training College
- Akatsi College of Education
- Peki College of Education
- Holy Spirit College of Education
- St. Francis College of Education
- St. Theresa's College of Education
- E.P College of Education, Amedzofe

=== Senior High Schools ===
- St. Paul's Senior High School (SPACO)
- Some Senior High School (SOSEC)
- Klikor Senior High Technical School (KLISTECH)
- Bishop Herman College (BIHECO)
- Kpando Senior High School
- Keta Senior High Technical School
- OLA Girls Senior High School (Ho)
- Mawuko Girls' Senior High School
- Mafi Kumase Senior High Technical School
- Adidome Senior High School
- Sogakofe Senior High School
- Keta Business College
- Wallahs Academy SHS (Ho)
- Adaklu Senior High School, (Adaklu Waya)
- Awudome Senior High School (AWUSCO), Tsito-Awudome
- Ave Senior High School (AVESCO), Ave Dakpa
- Ziope Senior High School
- Mawuli School (Ho)
- St Prosper's College (Ho)
- Ideal College
- Social Welfare Vocational Training Centre (SWEVCO), Ho
- Sonrise Christian High School
- Abor Senior High School
- Zion College
- Tanyigbe Senior High School
- Three Town Senior High School
- Hohoe E.P Senior High School (HEPSS)
- Vakpo Secondary School
- Vakpo Secondary Senior High Technical
- Kpedze Senior High School
- Peki Senior High School
- Shia Senior High School
- Peki Senior High Technical School (Pestech)
- Kpeve Senior High Technical School
- Have Technical Institute
- Anfoega Senior High School
- Taviefe Senior High School
- Agate Senior High School
- Atiavi Senior High Technical School (Atiavi)
- Alavanyo Senior High Technical School
- E.P. Tech/Voc. Institute (Alavanyo)
- Kpando Technical Institute
- Leklebi Senior High School
- Ve Community Senior High School (Ve Koloenu)
- Tsito Senior High Technical School
- Abutia Senior High Technical School
- Sokode Senior High Technical School
- St. Catherine Girls Senior High School
- Wovenu Senior High Technical School, Tadzewu
- Akatsi Senior High Technical School

== Health ==
The Volta Regional Hospital is located at Ho. It is popularly referred to as Trafalgar. The inception of the University of Health and Allied Sciences (UHAS) at Ho has led to it being redesignated as the Ho Teaching Hospital in 2019. Other government run health facilities in the capital are the Ho Municipal Hospital and the Ho Polyclinic. Hospitals in the region include:

List of major hospitals in the Volta Region
District	Location	Hospital
Akatsi South	Akatsi	Akatsi District Hospital
Akatsi South	Akatsi	St. Paul's Hospital
Ho Municipal	Ho	Ho Teaching Hospital
Ho Municipal	Ho	Ho Municipal Hospital
Ho Municipal	Ho	Ho Polyclinic
Hohoe Municipal	Hohoe	Hohoe Municipal Hospital
Keta Municipal	Abor	Sacred Heart Hospital
Keta Municipal	Keta	Keta Government Hospital
Ketu South Municipal	Aflao	Ketu South Municipal Hospital
Kpando Municipal	Kpando	Margaret Marquart Catholic Hospital
North Dayi	Anfoega	Anfoega Catholic Hospital
North Tongu	Adidome	Adidome Hospital
North Tongu	Battor	Catholic Hospital
South Dayi	Peki	Peki Government Hospital
South Tongu	Sogakope	Sogakope District Hospital

=== Togoland Congress ===
The Togoland Congress (TCP) was a political party formed in 1951 to campaign for the unification of the Ewe people in British Togoland and French Togoland as a separate Ewe state. The party was defeated in the May 1956 UN plebiscite in British Togoland, which resulted in the unification of British Trans-Volta Togoland with Gold Coast, which later became independent as Ghana.

On 9 May 1956, a vote was conducted to decide the future disposition of British Togoland and French Togoland. The native and dominant ethnic group, the Ewe people, were divided between the two Togos. British Togoland inhabitants voted in favor of state union with the Gold Coast, and the Togo Ewe state was incorporated with Gold Coast.

There was vocal opposition to the incorporation of Togoland into modern Ghana, from the Ewe people who voted (42%) against in British Togoland, as the Ewe wanted the unification of the Ewe people in British Togoland and French Togoland as a separate Ewe state (modern Togo).

Recently, a campaign for the cessation of some part of the Volta Region from Ghana to be known as "Western Togoland" is being led by a group calling itself Homeland Study Group Foundation. The group is led by Charles Kormi Kudzodzi.

== Tourism ==
Theora video of Tagbo Falls in Hohoe, Hohoe Municipal, Volta region.

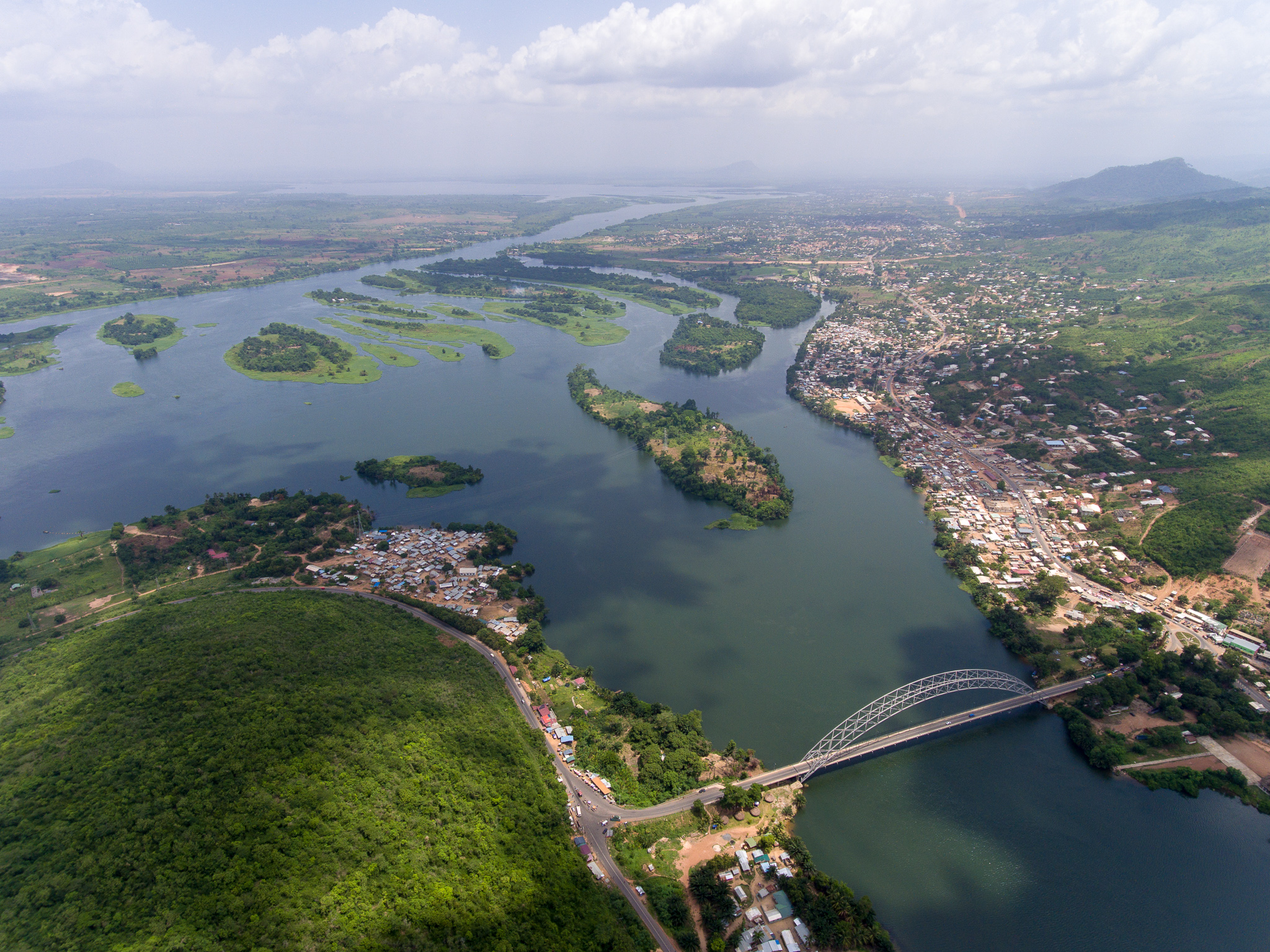
Aerial view from the north of the Adomi Bridge

=== Recreation areas ===
Museum

- Volta Regional Museum

=== Mountains ===
- Mount Afadja
- Mount Adaklu
- Mount Gemi

=== Other tourist attractions ===
Waterfalls

- Tafi Agome Caves
- Tafi Atome Monkey Sanctuary
- Wli Waterfalls
- Tagbo Falls
- Amedzofe Falls
- Biakpa Falls and Caves
- Kpoeta waterfalls (at Ho West District)
- Mount Afadja
- Mount Gemi
- Akpom Falls and limestone cave Logba Tota
- Snake Village Liate Wote
- Adidime waterfalls Klefe (at Ho Municipal)
- Ave Crocodile Resort (Ave Dakpa)

== Notable citizens ==
Notable native citizens of Volta
#	Citizen	Settlement
1	Erica Nego	Ho
2	Jerry Rawlings	Keta
3	Kofi Awoonor	Wheta
4	Peter Bossman	Ho
5	Prof. A.C. Kuma	Leklebi
6	Ave Kludze	Hohoe
7	Fiifi Fiavi Kwetey	Nogokpo
8	Dzifa Ativor	Abutia
9	Ephraim Amu	Abenase
10	Komla Dumor	Aflao
11	Togbe Afede XIV	Ho
12	Stonebwoy	Alakple
13	Mz Vee	Dzodze
14	John Dumelo	Hohoe
15	Philip Gbeho	Vodza
16	Kofi Adjorlolo	Klikor
17	Edem	Dzodze
18	John Peter Amewu	Hohoe
19	Esther Ocloo	Peki
20	Joseph Edward Michel	Atikpui
21	Emmanuel Kotoka	Fiaxor
22	Anthony Deku	
23	J. W. K. Harlley	Anyako
24	Courage Quashigah	Kedzi
25	Harry Dumashie	Dzelukope
26	Kojo Tsikata	Keta
27	Tsatsu Tsikata	Keta
28	Mac Sarbah	Mepe
29	Seth Anthony	Adafienu
30	Gilbert Ansre	Peki
