= Postal codes in Ghana =

Postal codes were adopted in Ghana on 18 October 2017, following the launch of the National Digital Address System. As a joint venture between Ghana Post (with support from the Government of Ghana]) and Vokacom Ltd as GhanaPost GPS, the Digital Address System assigned postal codes and unique addresses to every square in Ghana.

Ghana's postal codes are alphanumeric. The first two characters form the postcode district - the first letter represents the region, and the second character represents the district in which the address is located. The next three to five digits represent the postcode area and identify a more precise location within area.

Together, the postcode district and postcode area form the postal code. For example, the Kwame Nkrumah Memorial Park & Mausoleum in Accra is located in postal code GA184, where GA represents the postcode district - G for the Greater Accra Region and A for the Accra Metropolitan District - and 184 represents the postcode area.

Examples of postal codes are GA107, EO1070, and N503074.

== Format ==
The simplest address format, recognized by the national post, Ghana Post is: Recipient Name, Street Name, Digital Address, Area, Region. This is being implemented by Scuttle Box and Ghana Post which provide your address on your mailbox, to ensure there is consistency and accuracy in all deliveries and addressing. The postal codes are alphanumeric and are variable in length, ranging from five to seven characters. In general, five-digit postal codes denote metropolitan districts and major urban areas, six-digit postal codes denote municipal districts and peri-urban areas, and seven-digit postal codes denote ordinary districts and small towns.

Each postal code is divided into two parts: the postcode district and postcode area. The center of each postcode district falls within the district capital and is designated as postcode area "000". For example, postal code GA000 denotes the center of postcode district GA within Accra, the district capital of the Accra Metropolitan district, and corresponds to the 5 meter square area around the Jubilee House.

Postcode areas are numbered sequentially and spiral out anticlockwise from the center of the postcode district, with sequential postcode areas located 500 meters apart. For example, postal code GA008, which corresponds to the area of the 37 Military Hospital in Accra is 500 meters from GA009 and suggests proximity to the center of the district - proximity to postal code GA000.

Region	Postcode district	Postcode district name	Coverage
Ashanti Region	AA	Asante Akim South District	Juaso
Ashanti Region	AB	Bekwai Municipal District	Bekwai
Ashanti Region	AC	Asante Akim Central Municipal District	Konongo
Ashanti Region	AD	Kwabre East District	Mamponteng
Ashanti Region	AE	Ejisu Juaben Municipal District	Ejisu
Ashanti Region	AF	Afigya Kwabre District	Kodie
Ashanti Region	AG	Atwima Kwanwoma District	Atwima Foase
Ashanti Region	AH	Atwima Nwabiagya District	Nkawie
Ashanti Region	AI	Atwima Mponua District	Nyinahin
Ashanti Region	AJ	Ejura Sekyedumase Municipal District	Ejura
Ashanti Region	AK	Kumasi Metropolitan District	Kumasi
Ashanti Region	AM	Mampong Municipal District	Mampong
Ashanti Region	AN	Asante Akim North District	Agogo
Ashanti Region	AO	Obuasi Municipal District	Obuasi
Ashanti Region	AP	Sekyere Afram Plains District	Drobonso
Ashanti Region	AQ	Sekyere Central District	
Ashanti Region	AR	Sekyere East District	Effiduase
Ashanti Region	AS	Asokore Mampong Municipal District	
Ashanti Region	AT	Bosomtwe District	Kuntanase
Ashanti Region	AU	Kumawu District	Kumawu
Ashanti Region	AV	Amansie Central District	Jacobu
Ashanti Region	AW	Amansie West District	Manso Nkwanta
Ashanti Region	AX	Ahafo Ano North District	Tepa
Ashanti Region	AY	Ahafo Ano South District	Mankranso
Ashanti Region	AZ	Sekyere South District	Agona
Ashanti Region	A2	Adansi North District	Fomena
Ashanti Region	A3	Adansi South District	New Edubiase
Ashanti Region	A4, A9	Bosome Freho District	Asiwa
Ashanti Region	A6	Offinso North District	Akomadan
Ashanti Region	A7	Offinso South Municipal District	New Offinso
Bono East Region	BA	Atebubu-Amantin District	Atebubu
Bono Region	BB	Berekum Municipal District	Berekum
Bono Region	BC	Banda District	Banda Ahenkro
Bono Region	BD	Dormaa Municipal District	Dormaa-Ahenkro
Bono Region	BE	Dormaa East District	Wamfie
Bono Region	BF	Dormaa West District	Nkrankwanta
Bono East Region	BG	Sene East District	Kajaji
Bono East Region	BH	Sene West District	Kwame Danso
Bono Region	BI	Jaman South District	Drobo
Bono Region	BJ	Jaman North District	Sampa
Bono East Region	BK	Kintampo North Municipal District	Kintampo
Bono East Region	BL	Kintampo South District	Jema
Bono East Region	BN	Nkoranza North District	Busunya
Bono East Region	BO	Nkoranza South Municipal District	Nkoranza
Bono East Region	BP	Pru District	Yeji
Ahafo Region	BQ	Asutifi North District	Kenyasi
Ahafo Region	BR	Asutifi South District	Hwidiem
Bono Region	BS	Sunyani Municipal District	Sunyani
Bono East Region	BT	Techiman Municipal District	Techiman
Ahafo Region	BU	Asunafo North Municipal District	Goaso
Ahafo Region	BV	Asunafo South District	Kukuom
Bono Region	BW	Wenchi Municipal District	Wenchi
Bono East Region	BX	Techiman North District	Tuobodom
Bono Region	BY	Sunyan West District	Odomase
Bono Region	BZ	Tain District	Nsawkaw
Ahafo Region	B2	Tano North Municipal District	Duayaw-Nkwanta
Ahafo Region	B3	Tano South Municipal District	Bechem
Central Region	CA	Abura Asebu Kwamankese District	Dunkwa
Central Region	CB	Asikuma Odoben Brakwa District	Breman Asikuma
Central Region	CC	Cape Coast Metropolitan District	Cape Coast
Central Region	CE	Effutu Municipal District	Winneba
Central Region	CF	Ekumfi District	Essarkyir
Central Region	CG	Gomoa East District	Afransi
Central Region	CH	Twifo Heman Lower Denkyira District	Heman
Central Region	CI	Gomoa West District	Apam
Central Region	CJ	Ajumako Enyan Esiam District	Ajumako
Central Region	CK	Komenda Edina Eguafo Municipal District	Elmina
Central Region	CM	Mfantseman Municipal District	Saltpond
Central Region	CO	Agona West Municipal District	Swedru
Central Region	CP	Agona East District	Nsaba
Central Region	CR	Assin North Municipal District	Assin Fosu
Central Region	CS	Assin South District	Nsuaem-Kyekyewere
Central Region	CT	Twifo-Ati Morkwa District	Twifo Praso
Central Region	CU	Upper Denkyira East Municipal District	Dunkwa-on-Offin
Central Region	CV	Upper Denkyira West District	Diaso
Central Region	CW	Awutu Senya District	Awutu Breku
Central Region	CX	Awutu Senya East Municipal District	Kasoa
Eastern Region	EA	Asuogyaman District	Atimpoku
Eastern Region	EB	Birim Central Municipal District	Akim Oda
Eastern Region	ED	Denkyembour District	Akwatia
Eastern Region	EE	East Akim Municipal District	Kibi
Eastern Region	EF	Fanteakwa District	Begoro
Eastern Region	EG	Nsawam Adoagyiri Municipal District	Nsawam
Eastern Region	EH	Kwahu East District	Abetifi
Eastern Region	EI	Kwahu South District	Mpreaso
Eastern Region	EJ	Kwahu West Municipal District	Nkawkaw
Eastern Region	EK	Kwaebibirem District	Kade
Eastern Region	EL	Lower Manya Krobo Municipal District	Odumase
Eastern Region	EM	Akyemansa District	Ofoase
Eastern Region	EN	New Juaben Municipal District	Koforidua
Eastern Region	EO	Ayensuano District	Coaltar
Eastern Region	EP	Kwahu Afram Plains North District	Donkorkrom
Eastern Region	EQ	Kwahu Afram Plains South District	Tease
Eastern Region	ES	Suhum Municipal District	Suhum
Eastern Region	ET	Atiwa District	Kwabeng
Eastern Region	EU	Upper Manya Krobo District	Asesewa
Eastern Region	EV	Upper West Akim District	Adeiso
Eastern Region	EW	West Akim Municipal District	Asamankese
Eastern Region	EX	Birim North District	New Abirim
Eastern Region	EY	Yilo Krobo Municipal District	Somanya
Eastern Region	EZ	Birim South District	Akim Swedru
Eastern Region	E2	Akuapem North Municipal District	Akropong
Eastern Region	E3	Akuapem South District	Aburi
Greater Accra Region	GA	Accra Metropolitan District	North Ridge - GA015 - GA017, GA028 - GA031, GA052 - GA054, GA076, GA080 West Ridge - GA050, GA051, GA077, GA107; Gold Coast City - GA078, GA079, GA110, GA111; Osu - GA032, GA035, GA055, GA056, GA081, GA082, GA112 - GA115, GA146 - 148; Victoriaborg - GA143 - GA145, GA184 - GA186; Asylum Down - GA027, GA028, GA048, GA049, GA073; Adabraka - GA050, GA074 - GA076, GA100 - GA103; Tudu - GA105, GA106, GA141, GA142
Greater Accra Region	GB	Ashaiman Municipal District	Ashaiman, Tema communities 21 and 22
Greater Accra Region	GC	Ga Central Municipal District	Sowutuom
Greater Accra Region	GD	Adentan Municipal District	Adenta
Greater Accra Region	GE	Ga East Municipal District	Abokobi
Greater Accra Region	GK	Kpone Katamanso District	Kpone, Oyibi, Tema communities 24 and 25
Greater Accra Region	GL	La Dade Kotopon Municipal District	La, Labadi, Cantonments, Burma Camp, Airport City
Greater Accra Region	GM	La Nkwantanang Madina Municipal District	Madina
Greater Accra Region	GN	Ningo Prampram District	Prampram
Greater Accra Region	GO	Shai Osudoku District	Dodowa
Greater Accra Region	GS	Ga South Municipal District	Weija
Greater Accra Region	GT	Tema Metropolitan District	Tema communities 1 - 20, 23
Greater Accra Region	GW	Ga West Municipal District	Amasaman
Greater Accra Region	GX	Ada West District	Sege
Greater Accra Region	GZ	Ledzokuku-Krowor Municipal District	Teshie, Nungua, Baatsona
Northern Region	NA	Kpandai District	Kpandai
Savannah Region	NB	Bole District	Bole, Bamboi, Maluwe, Tinga, Tasilma, Mandari, Banda/Nkwanta
North East Region	NC	Chereponi District	Chereponi
North East Region	ND	West Mamprusi District	Walewale
North East Region	NE	East Mamprusi District	Gambaga
North East Region	NF	Tatale Sanguli District	Tatale
Northern Region	NG	Gushegu District	Gushegu
Northern Region	NI	Mion District	Sang
Northern Region	NK	Kumbugu District	Kumbugu
Northern Region	NL	Tolon District	Tolon
North East Region	NM	Mamprugu Moaduri District	Yagaba
Northern Region	NN	Nanumba North District	Bimbilla
Northern Region	NO	Nanumba South District	Wulensi
North East Region	NP	Bunkpurugu-Yunyoo District	Bunkpurugu
Northern Region	NR	Karaga District	Karaga
Northern Region	NS	Sagnerigu District	Sagnerigu
Northern Region	NT	Tamale Metropolitan District	Tamale
Northern Region	NU	Savelugu Nanton Municipal District	Savelugu
Savannah Region	NW	Sawla Tuna Kalba District	Sawla
Northern Region	NX	Saboba District	Saboba
Northern Region	NY	Yendi Municipal District	Yendi
Northern Region	NZ	Zabzugu District	Zabzugu
Savannah Region	N2	North Gonja District	Daboya
Savannah Region	N3	Central Gonja District	Buipe
Savannah Region	N4	East Gonja District	Salaga
Savannah Region	N5	West Gonja District	Damongo
Upper East Region	UA	Bawku Municipal District	Bawku
Upper East Region	UB	Bolgatanga Municipal District	Bolgatanga Municipal District
Upper East Region	UE	Bolgatanga East District	Bolgatanga East District
Upper East Region	UG	Garu Tempane District	Garu
Upper East Region	UK	Kassena Nankana Municipal District	Navrongo
Upper East Region	UL	Kassena Nankana West District	Paga
Upper East Region	UN	Nabdam District	Nangodi
Upper East Region	UO	Bongo District	Bongo
Upper East Region	UP	Pusiga District	Pusiga
Upper East Region	UR	Builsa North District	Sandema
Upper East Region	US	Builsa South District	Fumbisi
Upper East Region	UT	Talensi District	Tongo
Upper East Region	UU	Binduri District	Binduri
Upper East Region	UW	Bawku West District	Zebilla
Upper West Region	XD	Daffiama Bussie Issa District	Issa
Upper West Region	XJ	Jirapa District	Jirapa
Upper West Region	XK	Lambussi Karni District	Lambussi
Upper West Region	XL	Lawra District	Lawra
Upper West Region	XN	Nandom District	Nandom
Upper West Region	XO	Nadowli Kaleo District	Nadowli
Upper West Region	XS	Sissala East District	Tumu
Upper West Region	XT	Sissala West District	Gwollu
Upper West Region	XW	Wa Municipal District	Wa
Upper West Region	XX	Wa East District	Funsi
Upper West Region	XY	Wa West District	Wechiau
Volta Region	VA	Adaklu District	Adaklu Waya
Oti Region	VB	Biakoye District	Nkonya
Volta Region	VC	Hohoe Municipal District	Hohoe
Volta Region	VD	North Dayi Municipal District	Anfoega
Volta Region	VE	South Dayi District	Kpeve
Volta Region	VF	Afadzato South District	Ve Golokwati
Volta Region	VG	Agotime-Ziope District	Kpetoe
Volta Region	VH	Ho Municipal District	Ho
Volta Region	VI	Ho West District	Dzolokpuita
Oti Region	VJ	Jasikan District	Jasikan
Volta Region	VK	Keta Municipal District	Keta
Oti Region	VM	Kadjebi District	Kadjebi
Oti Region	VN	Nkwanta North District	Kpassa
Oti Region	VO	Nkwanta South Municipal District	Nkwanta
Volta Region	VP	Kpando Municipal District	Kpando
Oti Region	VQ	Krachi Nchumuru District	Chindiri
Oti Region	VR	Krachi East Municipal District	Dambai
Oti Region	VS	Krachi West District	Kete Krachi
Volta Region	VT	North Tongu District	Battor Dugame
Volta Region	VU	South Tongu District	Sogakope
Volta Region	VV	Central Tongu District	Adidome
Volta Region	VW	Akatsi North District	Ave Dakpa
Volta Region	VX	Akatsi South District	Akatsi
Volta Region	VY	Ketu North Municipal District	Dzodze
Volta Region	VZ	Ketu South Municipal District	Denu
Western North Region	WA	Aowin District	Enchi
Western North Region	WB	Bibiani/Anhwiaso/Bekwai District	Bibiani
Western North Region	WC	Bia East District	Adabokrom
Western North Region	WD	Bia West District	Essam
Western Region	WE	Ellembelle District	Nkroful
Western North Region	WF	Sefwi Akontombra District	Akontombra
Western North Region	WG	Sefwi Wiawso Municipal District	Wiawso
Western Region	WH	Ahanta West District	Agona Ahanta
Western Region	WJ	Jomoro District	Half Assini
Western Region	WM	Mpohor District	Mpohor
Western Region	WN	Nzema East Municipal District	Axim
Western North Region	WO	Bodi District	Bodi
Western Region	WP	Prestea Huni Valley District	Prestea
Western North Region	WQ	Juaboso District	Juaboso
Western Region	WR	Shama District	Shama
Western Region	WS	Sekondi-Takoradi Metropolitan District	Sekondi-Takoradi
Western Region	WT	Tarkwa Nsuaem Municipal District	Tarkwa
Western Region	WU	Suaman District	Dadieso
Western Region	WW	Amenfi Central District	Manso Amenfi
Western Region	WX	Amenfi East District	Wassa-Akropong
Western Region	WY	Amenfi West District	Asankrangwa
Western Region	WZ	Wassa East District	Daboase

== Availability of the algorithm ==
The list of frequently asked questions, as of December 2017, does not state if/where the algorithm for generating the postcodes is publicly available, or how the algorithm is licensed. It is also not stated if/how bulk conversion of coordinates into postcodes is possible. This suggests that, at least at present, the algorithm is likely proprietary. This is a feature also of other postcode systems, although open postcode systems are also available. Open postcode-like systems include the Open Location Code. An example for a proprietary system that was subsequently made available under an open license includes Postcodes in the United Kingdom.
