= Kete Krachi District =

- Former District Council
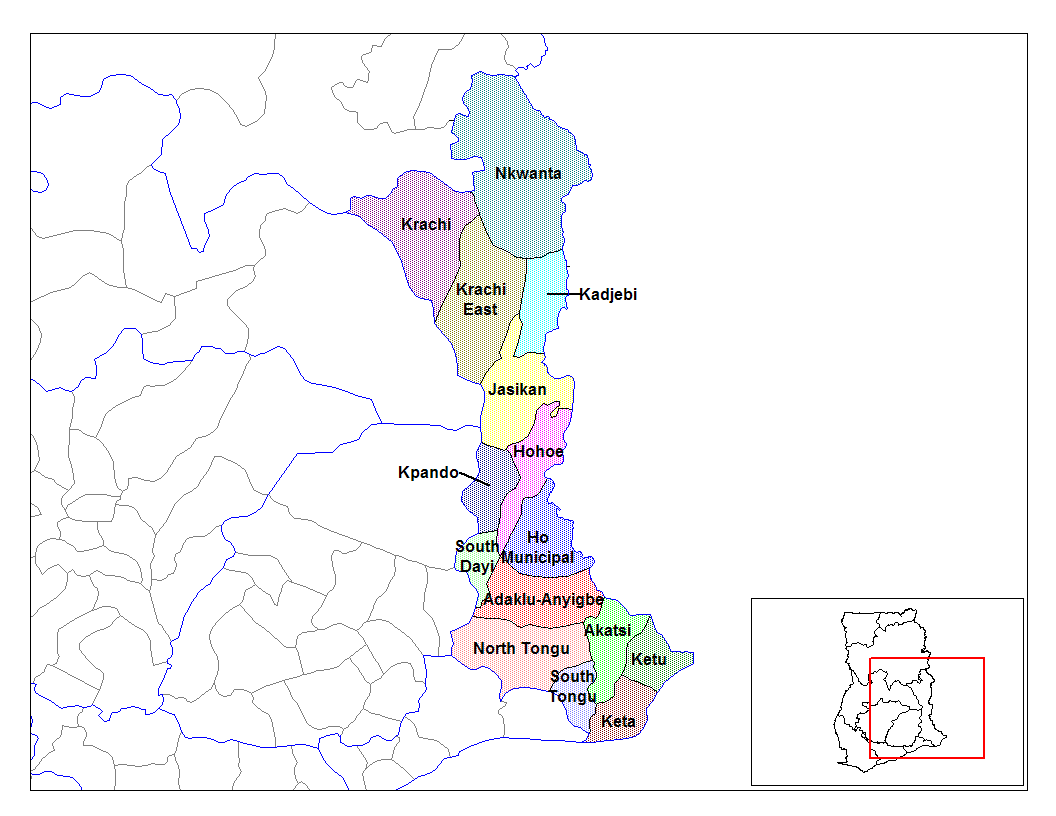
- Districts of Volta Region

- Location of Kete Krachi District within Volta
- Coordinates: 7°48′7.2″N 0°3′3.6″W
- Country: Ghana
- Region: Volta
- Capital: Kete Krachi
- Time zone: UTC+0 (GMT)
- ISO 3166 code: GH-TV-__

Kete Krachi District is a former district council that was located in Volta Region (now currently in Oti Region), Ghana. Originally created as an ordinary district assembly in 1975. However, on 1988, it was split off into two new district assemblies: Krachi District (capital: Kete Krachi) and Nkwanta District (capital: Nkwanta). The district assembly was located in the northern part of Volta Region and had Kete Krachi as its capital town.
