= Solomon Kuyon =

Ghanaian politician

Hon. Solomon Kuyon
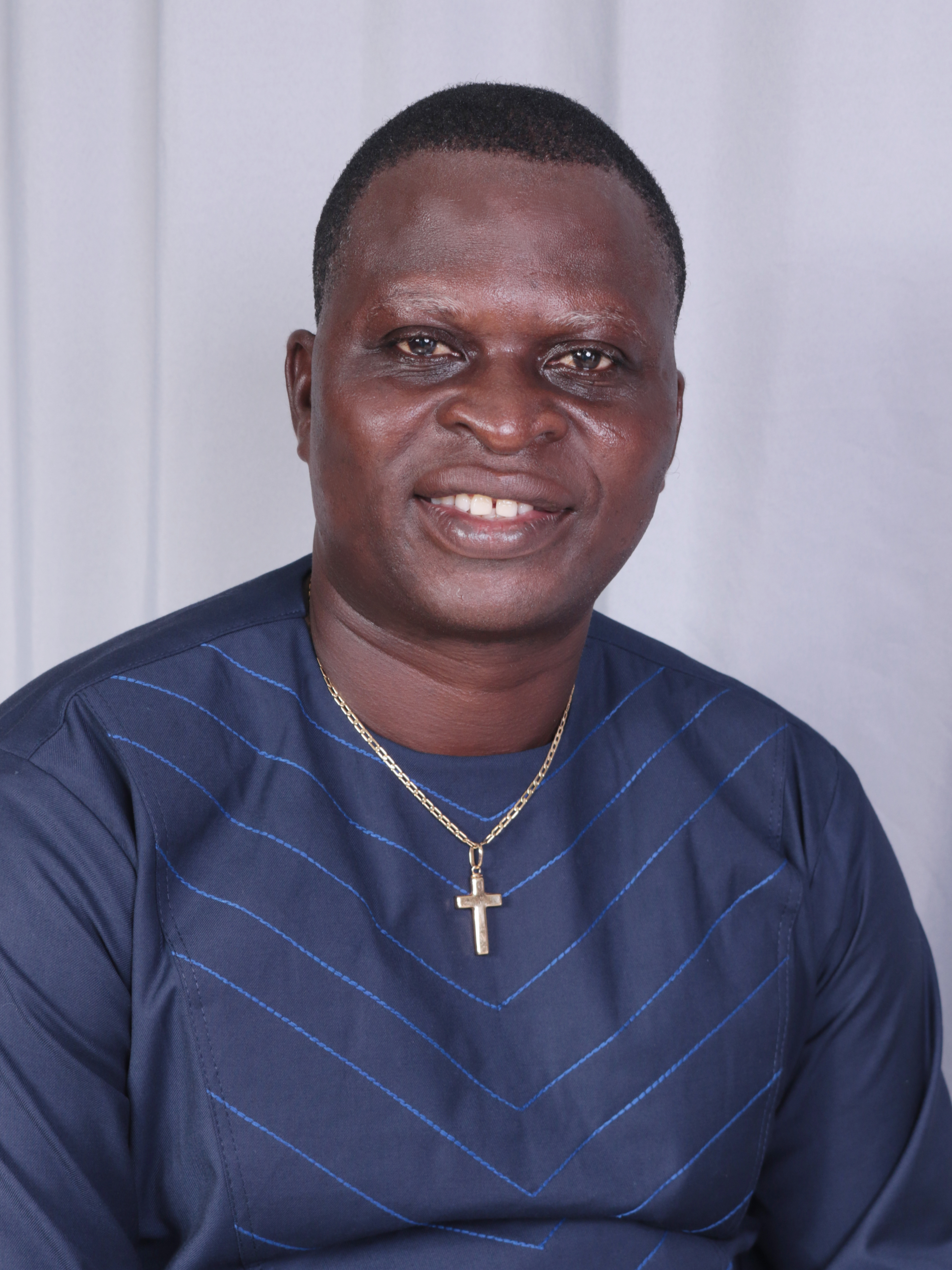

Member of Parliament for Krachi Nchumuru Constituency
- Incumbent
- Assumed office 7 January 2021
- Preceded by: John Majisi

Personal details
- Born: 28 August 1975 (age 50) Chinderi, Oti Region, Ghana
- Party: National Democratic Congress
- Occupation: Politician
- Committees: Members holding Office of Profit Committee ; Youth, Sports and Culture Committee

Solomon Kuyon (born 28 August 1975) is a Ghanaian politician. He is a member of the Eighth Parliament of the Fourth Republic of Ghana representing the Krachi Nchumuru Constituency in the Krachi Nchumuru District in the Oti Region of Ghana. He was a former Chief Executive Officer of Krachi Nchumuru district .

== Early life and career ==
Kuyon was born on 28 August 1975. He hails from Chinderi. He holds a master's degree in Democracy, Governance, Law and Development (2016), a Bachelor of Art Degree in Political Science and Adult Education (2014) and a Diploma in Youth in Development Work. He was a Stevedore Supervisor at Golden Gate Services.

== Politics ==
Kuyon is a member of the National Democratic Congress. In September 2012, he was nominated by President John Dramani Mahama and confirmed as the District chief executive for Krachi Nchumuru District Assemble. He was his party's candidate for the December 2020 election. He won the parliamentary election with 13,488 votes representing 44.3% of the total votes cast, beating his main opponent Kakateche Innocent Tache of the New patriotic Party who obtained 12,404 votes representing 40.8% of the total valid votes cast.

=== Committees ===
He serves as a member of Youth, Sports and Culture Committee and Members holding Office of Profit Committee respectively in the Eighth Parliament of the Fourth Republic of Ghana.

== Personal life ==
He is a Christian.
