= Nkwanta (disambiguation) =

Nkwanta is the capital of Nkwanta South district, in the Volta Region of Ghana.

Nkwanta may also refer to:

Districts

- Nkwanta North District
- Nkwanta South District

Constituencies

- Nkwanta South (Ghana parliament constituency)
- Nkwanta North (Ghana parliament constituency)

Towns

- Manso Nkwanta
- Duayaw Nkwanta
