= Nkwanta North (Ghana parliament constituency) =

Constituency in Ghana

- constituency for the Parliament of Ghana
- District: Nkwanta North District
- Region: Oti Region of Ghana

Current constituency
- Created: 2004
- Party: National Democratic Congress
- MP: John Oti Bless

Nkwanta North is one of the constituencies represented in the Parliament of Ghana. It elects one Member of Parliament (MP) by the first past the post system of election. Nkwanta North is located in the Nkwanta district of the Oti Region of Ghana.

== Boundaries ==
The seat is located within the Nkwanta North District of the Oti Region of Ghana. It is bounded to the south by the Nkwanta South District and to the east by the Republic of Togo. To the north is the Northern Region and to the west, the Northern Region and the Volta River.

== History ==
It was formed prior to the 2004 December presidential and parliamentary elections by the division of the old Nkwanta constituency into the new Nkwanta North and Nkwanta South constituencies.

== Members of Parliament ==
First elected	Member	Party
2004	New Constituency	
2004	Joseph Kwaku Nayan	New Patriotic Party
2012	John Oti Bless	National Democratic Congress

== Elections ==
2008 Ghanaian parliamentary election: Nkwanta North Source:Ghana Home Page
Party	Candidate	Votes	%	±%
New Patriotic Party	Joseph Kwaku Nayan	9,426	58.1	+28.1
National Democratic Congress	Dr. Joseph Kwabena Manboah-Rockson	3,241	20	−5.2
Independent	Solomon Kwame Bachabori	3,241	20	—
People's National Convention	Emmanuel Kwadjo Gmanab	308	1.9	—
Majority		6,185	38.1	+34.4
Turnout				—

2004 Ghanaian parliamentary election:Nkwanta North Source:Electoral Commission of Ghana
Party	Candidate	Votes	%	±%
New Patriotic Party	Joseph Kwaku Nayan	6,178	30.0	N/A
National Democratic Congress	Muftawu Iddrisu	5,424	26.3	N/A
Independent	Dr. J. Mamboah-Rockson	5,188	25.2	N/A
Independent	Abdulai Fulamba	3,678	17.9	N/A
Convention People's Party	Abdulai Aziz Tairu	123	0.6	N/A
Majority		754	3.7	N/A
Turnout		21,332	93.1	N/A

== See also ==
- List of Ghana Parliament constituencies
