= Krachi District =

- Former District
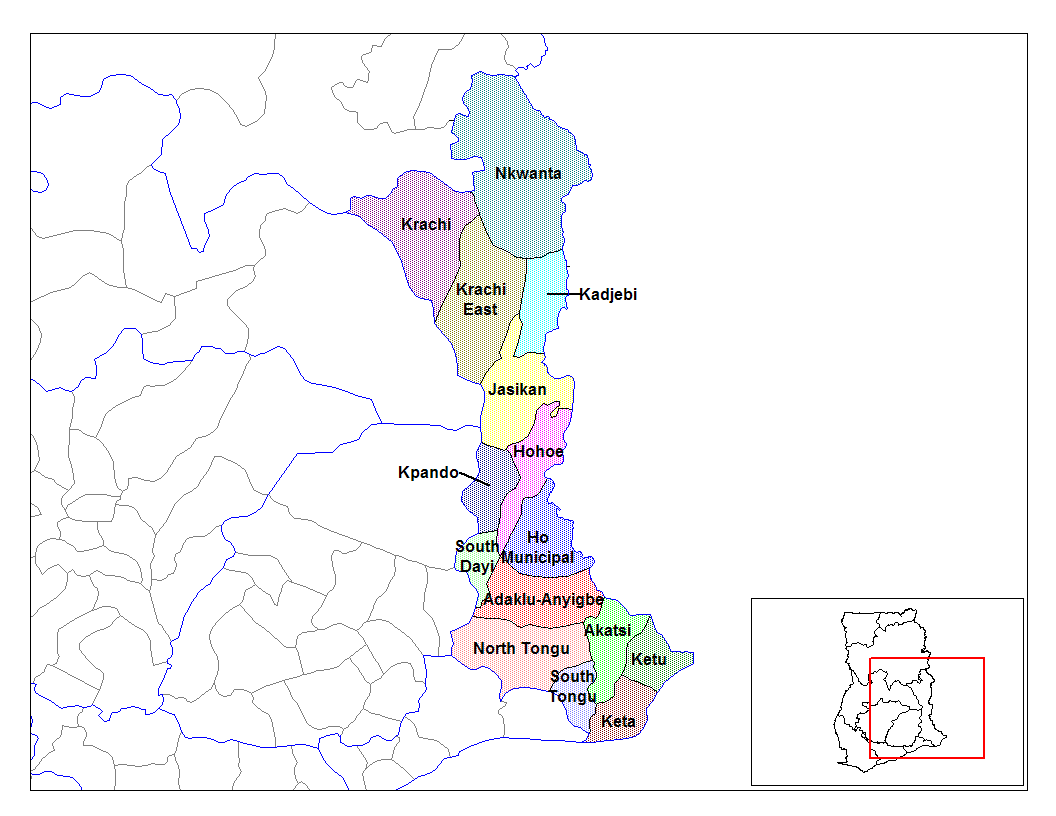
- Districts of Volta Region

- Location of Krachi District within Volta
- Coordinates: 7°48′7.2″N 0°3′3.6″W
- Country: Ghana
- Region: Volta
- Capital: Kete Krachi

Area
  - Total: 6,697 km^{2} (2,586 sq mi)
- Time zone: UTC+0 (GMT)
- ISO 3166 code: GH-TV-KR

Krachi District is a former district that was located in Volta Region (now currently in Oti Region), Ghana. Originally created as an ordinary district assembly on 10 March 1989. However, on 4 August 2004, it was split off into two new districts: Krachi West District (capital: Kete Krachi) and Krachi East District (which it was elevated to municipal district assembly status on 15 March 2018; capital: Dambai). The district assembly was located in the northern part of Volta Region and had Kete Krachi as its capital town.
