= Tapa Abotoase =

Coordinates: 7°25′N 0°19′E

Tapa Abotoase is one of the major towns in the Biakoye District of the Oti Region of Ghana. It is located around 7° 24' 0" North, 0° 18' 0" East geographical coordinates. Tapa Abotoase is the traditional capital of the Tapa Traditional Area. It is a fishing and farming community, with a periodic market. The indigenes of Tapa are Akans and therefore speak Twi.The 4 day periodic market observed in Tapa Abotoase attracts people from towns and villages across the Oti Region and Volta Region. A typical market day in Tapa Abotoase is not devoid of the buzzing noise from cars and hawkers. Some of the goods sold in the market include; fresh and smoked varies of fish, fruits, vegetables, cereals and legumes. Tapa Abotoase serves as the revenue basket for the Biakoye District. The people of Tapa Abotoase are known for celebrating the Frikoso Afahye (Festival).
