= Dambai College of Education =

Teacher training college in Dambai, Ghana

- Collège d'éducation de Dambai; Dambai Nikasemɔ Kɔlɛji lɛ
- Established: August 28, 1974
- Affiliations: Government of Ghana
- Location: Dambai, Krachi East District, VR00006, Ghana; 8.06568°N 0.17651°E
- Language: Guan, French, English
- Region Zone: Oti Region
- Short name: Dace
- Source: An Atlas of The Forty Colleges of Education in Ghana.

Dambai College of Education is a teacher education college in Dambai (Krachi East District, Oti Region, Ghana). The college is located in Volta Zone in the capital town of Oti region. It is one of the about 40 public colleges of education in Ghana. The college participated in the DFID-funded T-TEL programme.

== History ==
Dambai College of Education (DACE) was established on 28 August 1974 with the motto ‘SANKOFA’. The first principal was Mr. George Narh Bosumprah. The college opened with 31 students and 2 tutors. All the 31 students were males. Female students were admitted to the college in 1975. Mr. Ayensu, released his premises to house the first batch of students. A House in the college has been named after him.

The college was established to run a 4-year Teacher's Certificate ‘A’ Course. It remained a 4-year Certificate ‘A’ College till 1989 when the Teacher's Certificate ‘A’ 3-year post secondary course was introduced.

The college started the Diploma in Basic Education programme in October 2004. The first batch of the Diploma in Basic Education students came out in July 2007. The college continues to run general programme. In October, 2007 the college was given accreditation to tertiary level of education in Ghana. It offers sandwich programme for untrained teachers, for Diploma in Basic Education.

The college has four Halls of residence for students the school is located along the river volta. The Halls are Volta, Ayensu and Oti for the male students and Unity Hall for the female students.

List of Principals
Name	Years served
Bosompra G. N.	1974 -1980
Kwamuar S. Y.	1980 – 1982
Demuyakor C. K.	1982 – 1989
Dzomeku S. W. D. K.	1989 – 1990
Dedume S.F.K	1990 – 1994
Kokorokoh L. A. Y.	1994 – 2001
Amewotey J. S. K. (AG.)	2001 – 2002
Bobson D. P.	2002 – 2008
Rev. Agbeti E.K (AG.)	2008 - 2011
Y .I Musah	2011 - 2018
E. B Nomah (AG.)	2018 - 2019
Dr.(MRS) BENEDICTA AWUSI ATIKU	2019 - Date

In 2007, the Professional Board of the University of Cape Coast commended the college for improving its performance significantly in external examinations conducted by the Institute of Education. In the field of sports and games, Dambai College of Education has put u impressive performance over the years. In 2006/2007 academic year the college came first in soccer and cross-country competitions among the seven colleges in the Volta Region. The government has provided the college with a GETFund modern multi-purpose classroom block, a Library Complex, and an 8-unit 4 storey flats for tutors.
