= Mount Dzebobo =

Mountain in Ghana

- Location within Ghana

Highest point
- Elevation: 876 m (2,874 ft)
- Coordinates: 8°19′51″N 0°35′15″E

Geography
- Location: Nkwanta Municipal District, Oti Region, Ghana
- Parent range: Akwapim-Togo Range

Mount Dzebobo (French: Mont Dzebobo) is the second highest mountain in Ghana with a height of 876 meters. It is located in the Akwapim-Togo Range right on the border with Togo.

The mountain is located just a few kilometres south of Kyabobo National Park.

== See also ==
- List of national parks of Ghana
