= Kpassa =

- District Capital
- Location in Ghana
- Coordinates: 8°29′38″N 0°18′27″E
- Country: Ghana
- Region: Oti Region
- District: Nkwanta North District
- Elevation: 108 m (354 ft)
- Time zone: GMT
  - Summer (DST): GMT

Kpassa is the capital of Nkwanta North District, a district in the Oti Region of Ghana . The Oti Region was part of the Volta Region of Ghana until 2019. The indigenous inhabitants of Kpassa are mainly Konkombas. In the past, the inhabitants of Kpassa have mainly engaged in farming. This trend has changed during the past two decades. Younger inhabitants are actively pursuing education and small-scale business activities, while the older ones are into governance. As a result, Kpassa has undergone rapid expansion during these past two decades. The town is expected to expand further once the Eastern Corridor Road Project is completed. In terms of architecture, a returning visitor will easily notice that the town is rapidly shifting from mud buildings or atakpame to modern block buildings. In fact, most people in the town attach this shift to prestige and affluence in the society. At the current rate, one is expected to find fewer atakpame buildings a decade in the future. The economy of Kpassa is critical to the Volta Region, owing to its engagement in the production of valuable agricultural products such as corn, yam, cassava, millet, groundnuts, pepper, soya beans, and beans, among others.

== History and Demography ==
The present population of Kpassa is approximately 45,000. The entire Nkwanta North District has about 126,096 inhabitants, this is according to 2021 population and housing census.

== Education ==
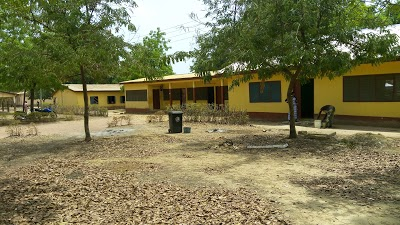
A building of the Kpassa Senior High School.

Kpassa is known for the Kpassa Senior High School. The school is a second cycle institution, which runs courses such as General Arts, Agricultural Science, and Technical Skills.

The town has a number of primary and junior high schools, including Kpassa L/A Primary and JSS A and B, ECG Primary and JHS, English/Arabic Primary and JHS, and Ago Primary and JHS. Although all these schools have contributed to the development of human capital in the town, most of the better known figures were educated in Kpassa L/A Primary and JHS B.

== Healthcare ==
Kpassa residents are served by two medical facilities, the Kpassa Health Centre and the Pentecost Clinic. Both facilities have experienced medical staff who are able to take care of common illnesses (cold, diarrhea, malaria etc.) and injuries (bruises, cuts, dislocated joints etc.). Severe illnesses and injuries are referred to Nkwanta and Dodi Papase hospitals. The Kpassa Health Centre is likely to be upgraded into a fully-fledged district hospital in the future, as residents continue to demand for it from the government.

== Economy ==
The economy of Kpassa contributes largely to overall business activities in the Volta Region. The town is known for its mass production of valuable agricultural products such as corn, yam, cassava, millet, groundnuts, pepper, soya beans, and beans, among others. Its physical market is the Kpassa Market, which is located closer to the Chief Palace. As in the case of other physical markets in Ghana, the market trades on every six days. That is, if today is the market day, the next will be in five days. There is, however, a smaller market day, which occurs a day before the main market day. On other days, the smaller market located at the Tinjase Junction alongside the main market carry the "everyday" regular transactions. On the market days, participants, both demand and supply sides, consist of residents and non-residents from Nkwanta, Kadjebi, Hohoe, Ho, Accra, among other places. The market undertakes modern day transactions involving cash exchanges, with a limited percentage involving barter trade. Kpassa's economy is a market economy with minor rules coordinated by the Chieftaincy.

== Administration ==
The administration of Kpassa – strategic initiatives, such as the urban transportation project, and local administration – is carried out by local government authorities, which are responsible for most local services, such as local planning, local roads and refuse collection within their area of jurisdiction. The local government, the Nkwanta North District government, was one of the 28 new districts inaugurated officially on 29 February 2008 by the then president of Ghana John Agyekum Kufuor.

== Social Activities ==
The popular social activities in Kpassa are sports and entertainment. The local schools regularly participate in an annual inter-school sports competitions. The town's main football team is the Kpassa Town Team also known as Kpassa Eleven Stoppers. The football team frequently engages in matches against rival teams from Bimbilla, Yendi, Nkwanta, Kadjebi, Papaase, Hohoe, among others. Some of the local footballing heroes are Yaw Nakiu, Akatapore, Awudu Issaka, and Yaw Kejinji. Locals are avid followers of popular Ghanaian football clubs such as Accra Hearts of Oak S.C., Heart of Lions F.C., and Asante Kotoko S.C. The town also boasts of followers of international football clubs such as Barcelona, Manchester United, Chelsea, A.C. Milan, among others.

== Administration ==
Christianity is the largest religion in Kpassa, like all parts of Ghana, with approximately 71.2% of Kpassa's population being member of various Christian denominations as of 2010 census. The religious composition of Kpassa in the first postindependence population census of 1960 was 25 percent Muslim, 23 percent traditionalist, 41 percent Christian, and the rest (about 9 percent) other. A breakdown of the 1960 population according to Christian sects showed that 25 percent were Protestant (non-Pentecostal); 13 percent, Roman Catholic; 2 percent, Protestant (Pentecostal); and 1 percent, Independent African Churches. The 1970 population census did not present figures on the religious composition of the nation.

Religious tolerance in Kpassa is very high. The major Christian celebrations of Christmas and Easter are recognized as national holidays. In the past, vacation periods have been planned around these occasions, thus permitting both Christians and others living away from home to visit friends and family in the rural areas. Ramadan Eid al-Fitr, the Islamic month of fasting, is observed by Muslims in Kpassa and all of parts of Ghana. This is then followed by Eid al-Adha also called the "Festival of the Sacrifice", which is the second of two Islamic holidays celebrated worldwide each year, and considered the holier of the two.

There is no significant link between ethnicity and religion in Kpassa, Ghana.

== Climate ==
Kpassa (Accra estimates)

Climate chart (precipitation, max. and min. temperature)
J	F	M	A	M	J	J	A	S	O	N	D
15 31 23	33 31 24	56 31 24	81 31 24	142 31 24	178 29 23	46 27 23	15 27 22	36 27 23	64 29 23	36 31 24	23 31 24
- █ Average max. and min. temperatures in °C
- █ Precipitation totals in mm
- Source: BBC Weather
Imperial conversion
J	F	M	A	M	J	J	A	S	O	N	D
0.6 87 73	1.3 88 75	2.2 88 76	3.2 88 76	5.6 87 75	7 84 74	1.8 81 74	0.6 80 71	1.4 81 73	2.5 85 74	1.4 87 75	0.9 88 75
- █ Average max. and min. temperatures in °F
- █ Precipitation totals in inches

Owing to its location in the Dahomey Gap, where the coast runs parallel to the prevailing moist monsoonal winds, Kpassa features a tropical savanna climate (Köppen climate classification Aw) that borders on a hot semi-arid climate (BSh). The average annual rainfall is about 730 mm, which falls primarily during Ghana's two rainy seasons. The chief rainy season begins in April and ends in mid-July, whilst a weaker second rainy season occurs in October. Rain usually falls in short intensive storms and causes local flooding in which drainage channels are obstructed.

Very little variation in temperature occurs throughout the year. The mean monthly temperature ranges from 25.9 °C (78.6 °F) in August (the coolest) to 29.6 °C (85.3 °F) in March (the hottest), with an annual average of 27.6 °C (81.7 °F). The "cooler" months tend to be more humid than the warmer months. As a result, during the warmer months and particularly during the windy harmattan season, the city experiences a breezy "dry heat" that feels less warm than the "cooler" but more humid rainy season.

As Kpassa is close to the equator, the daylight hours are practically uniform during the year. Relative humidity is generally high, varying from 65% in the mid-afternoon to 95% at night. The predominant wind direction in Kpassa is from the WSW to NNE sectors. Wind speeds normally range between 8 and 16 km/h. High wind gusts occur with thunderstorms, which generally pass in squalls along the coast.

The maximum wind speed record in Kpassa is 107.4 km/h (58 knots). Strong winds associated with thunderstorm activity often cause damage to property by removing roofing material. Several areas of Kpassa experience microclimatic effects. Low-profile drainage basins with a north–south orientation are not as well ventilated as those oriented east–west.

Climate data for Kpassa (based on Accra estimates, 1961–1990), extremes 1936–1997
Month	Jan	Feb	Mar	Apr	May	Jun	Jul	Aug	Sep	Oct	Nov	Dec	Year
Record high °C (°F)	35.8 (96.4)	37.1 (98.8)	36.2 (97.2)	35.0 (95.0)	34.6 (94.3)	31.5 (88.7)	32.3 (90.1)	32.8 (91.0)	33.9 (93.0)	33.6 (92.5)	38.0 (100.4)	36.0 (96.8)	38.0 (100.4)
Mean daily maximum °C (°F)	32.1 (89.8)	32.7 (90.9)	32.5 (90.5)	32.2 (90.0)	31.2 (88.2)	29.3 (84.7)	28.5 (83.3)	28.0 (82.4)	29.0 (84.2)	30.5 (86.9)	31.6 (88.9)	31.7 (89.1)	30.8 (87.4)
Daily mean °C (°F)	27.3 (81.1)	27.7 (81.9)	27.7 (81.9)	27.7 (81.9)	27.2 (81.0)	25.6 (78.1)	24.4 (75.9)	24.3 (75.7)	25.2 (77.4)	26.0 (78.8)	27.0 (80.6)	27.2 (81.0)	26.4 (79.5)
Mean daily minimum °C (°F)	23.4 (74.1)	24.1 (75.4)	24.1 (75.4)	24.2 (75.6)	23.9 (75.0)	23.1 (73.6)	22.5 (72.5)	22.2 (72.0)	22.4 (72.3)	23.9 (75.0)	23.5 (74.3)	23.4 (74.1)	23.4 (74.1)
Record low °C (°F)	15.0 (59.0)	16.7 (62.1)	18.9 (66.0)	19.4 (66.9)	18.6 (65.5)	17.8 (64.0)	17.8 (64.0)	17.2 (63.0)	18.3 (64.9)	19.4 (66.9)	17.8 (64.0)	16.7 (62.1)	15.0 (59.0)
Average precipitation mm (inches)	10.9 (0.43)	21.8 (0.86)	57.1 (2.25)	96.8 (3.81)	131.2 (5.17)	221.0 (8.70)	66.0 (2.60)	28.0 (1.10)	67.8 (2.67)	62.4 (2.46)	27.7 (1.09)	16.1 (0.63)	806.8 (31.76)
Average precipitation days	1	2	5	6	10	15	9	7	8	7	3	2	75
Average relative humidity (%)	77	78	79	80	81	85	84	83	81	82	80	80	81
Mean monthly sunshine hours	210.8	206.2	213.9	219.0	210.8	141.0	145.7	155.0	171.0	226.3	237.0	241.8	2,378.5
Mean daily sunshine hours	6.8	7.3	6.9	7.3	6.8	4.7	4.7	5.0	5.7	7.3	7.9	7.8	6.5
Source 1: World Meteorological Organization (average high, low and precipitation)
Source 2: Deutscher Wetterdienst (extremes, humidity 1952–1967, mean temperature 1941–1994, and sun)

== Geography and Popular Landmarks ==
Kpassa is located between Latitude 7°30’N and 8°45’N and Longitude 0°10’W and 045’E and serves as the district capital of Nkwanta North District. Kpassa is located 270 km to the south of Ho (the Regional Capital). The district has a surface area of approximately 1,1510 km^{2} thus making it one of the smallest districts in the Volta Region of Ghana. The district shares boundaries with the Nanumba South District to the North, Republic of Togo to the East, Kpandai District to the West, and Nkwanta District to the South.

== See also ==
- Nkwanta North (Ghana parliament constituency)
