= Krachi Nchumuru (Ghana parliament constituency) =

Constituency in Ghana

- constituency for the Parliament of Ghana
- District: Krachi Nchumuru
- Region: Oti Region of Ghana

Current constituency
- Created: 2012
- Party: National Democratic Congress
- MP: Solomon Kuyon

Krachi Nchumuru is one of the constituencies represented in the Parliament of Ghana. It elects one Member of Parliament (MP) by the first past the post system of election. Solomon Kuyon is the member of parliament for the constituency. Krachi Nchumuru is located in the Krachi Nchumuru district of the Oti Region of Ghana.

== Boundaries ==
The constituency was originally located within the Volta Region of Ghana until new Regions were created following the December 2018 referendum.

== Members of Parliament ==
First elected	Member	Party
2012	New Constituency	
2012	John Majisi	National Democratic Congress

== Elections ==
2016 Ghanaian parliamentary election: Krachi Nchumru Source:PeaceFM Online
Party	Candidate	Votes	%	±%
National Democratic Congress	John Majisi	11,833	50.75	−10.09
New Patriotic Party	Kakatechie Innocent Tache	10,856	46.56	+8.58
Independent	Mohammed Abdallah	491	2.11	—
Convention People's Party	John Kwasi Ogemekye	138	0.59	−0.15
Majority		977	4.19	−18.67
Turnout				—

2012 Ghanaian parliamentary election: Krachi Nchumuru Source:GhanaWeb
Party	Candidate	Votes	%	±%
National Democratic Congress	John Majisi	14,049	60.84	−—
New Patriotic Party	Kofi Tarkom Taylor	8,769	37.98	−—
Convention People's Party	John Kwasi Ogemekye	171	0.74	—
National Democratic Party	Adomako Quainoo Samuel	101	0.44	—
Majority		5,280	22.86	—
Turnout		23,090		—
