= Kyabobo National Park =

National park and tourist site in the Oti region of Ghana

- Parc national de Kyabobo
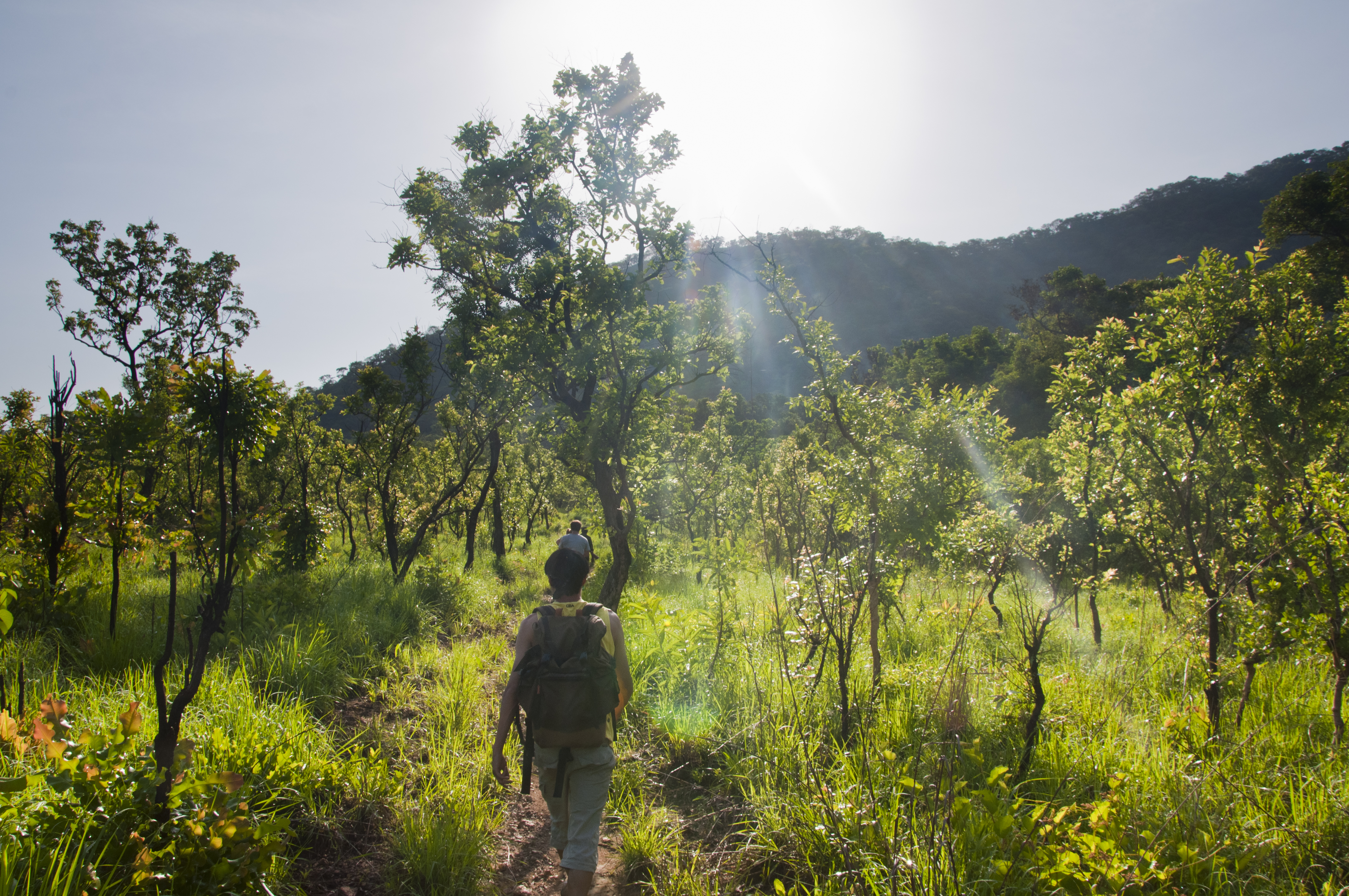

- Location within Ghana
- Location: Oti Region of Ghana
- Nearest city: Nkwanta
- Coordinates: 8°25′N 0°37′E
- Area: 360 km^{2} (140 sq mi)
- Established: 1993

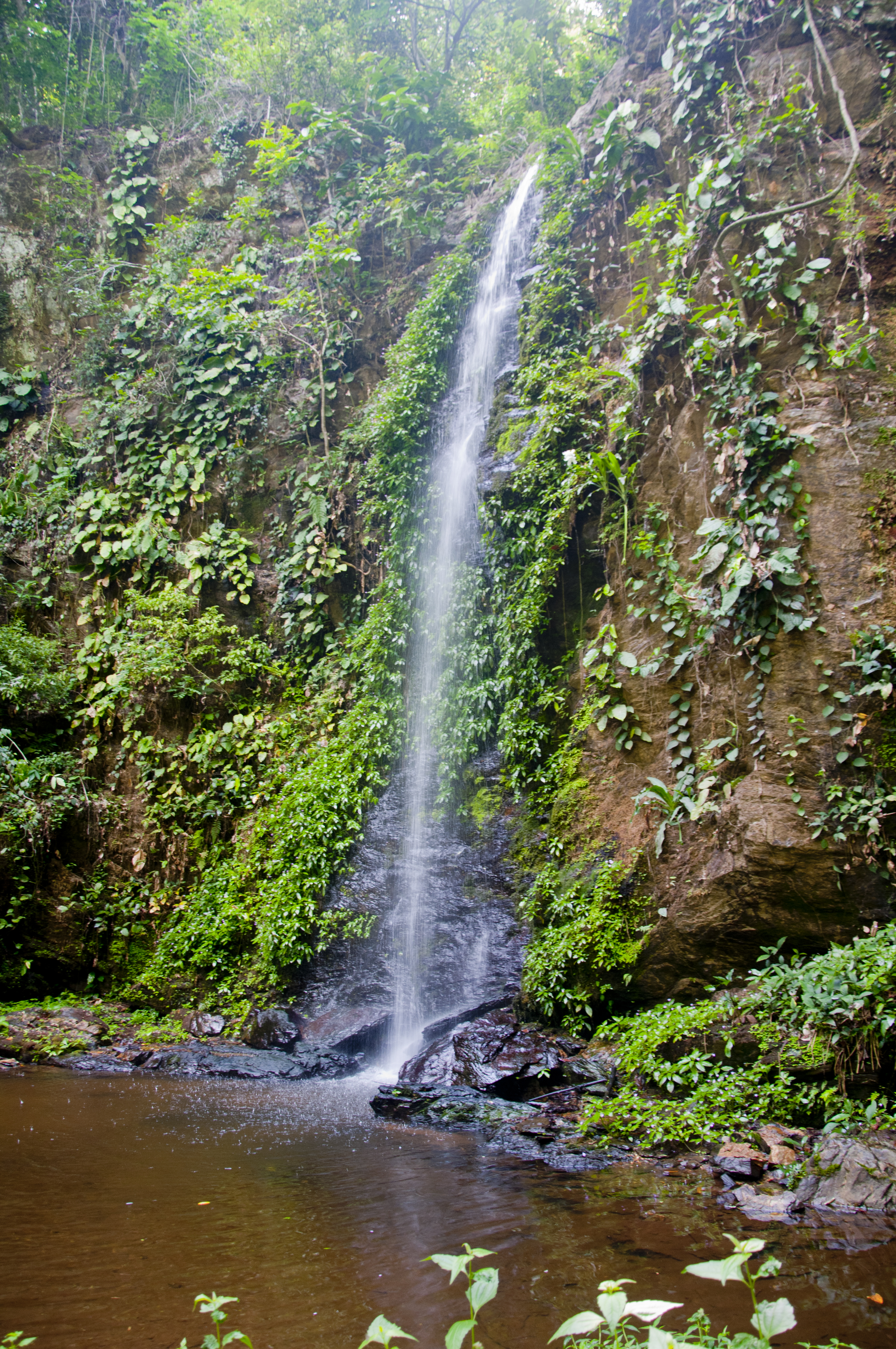
A small waterfall at Kyabobo National Park

Kyabobo National Park (pronounced CHA-bo-bo) is a 360 km^{2} (140 sq mi) national park in Ghana.

== History ==
The reserve was established in 1993 but its boundaries were adjusted several times until September 1999 when the current boundary was fixed.

== Geography ==
Kyabobo is located in the Oti Region on the border with Togo. The nearest town is Nkwanta. Ghana's second highest mountain, Mount Dzebobo, and the Breast Mountains are contained within the park and offer visitors an impressive view of Lake Volta. Dzebobo means "seen from afar" or "prominent" in the Ewe language.

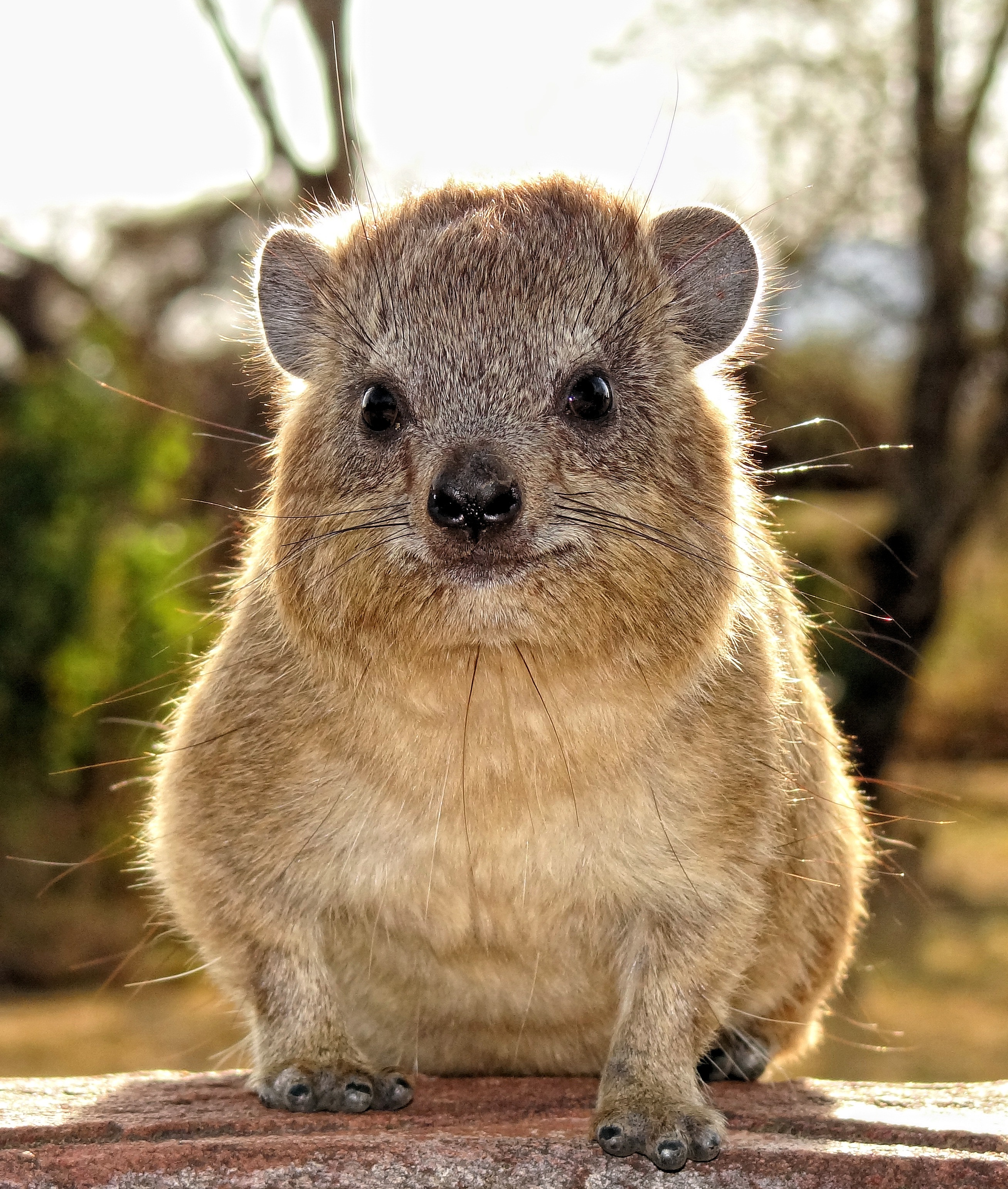
Rock hyrax

=== Environment ===
The park is located in a transition zone between tropical rain forest and tree savanna. The Park's wildlife includes African bush elephants, African leopards, African buffalo, waterbuck, several primate species, bushbuck, duikers and, a symbol for the park, the rock hyrax. A survey lists at least 500 species of butterflies and 235 birds. The park has been designated an Important Bird Area (IBA) by BirdLife International because it supports significant populations of many bird species.

== Facilities ==
The park has seven hiking trails and two mountain biking trails. The most popular hiking trail follows a ridge in the south-east corner of the park to a peak atop one of the Breast Mountains.

== Gallery ==
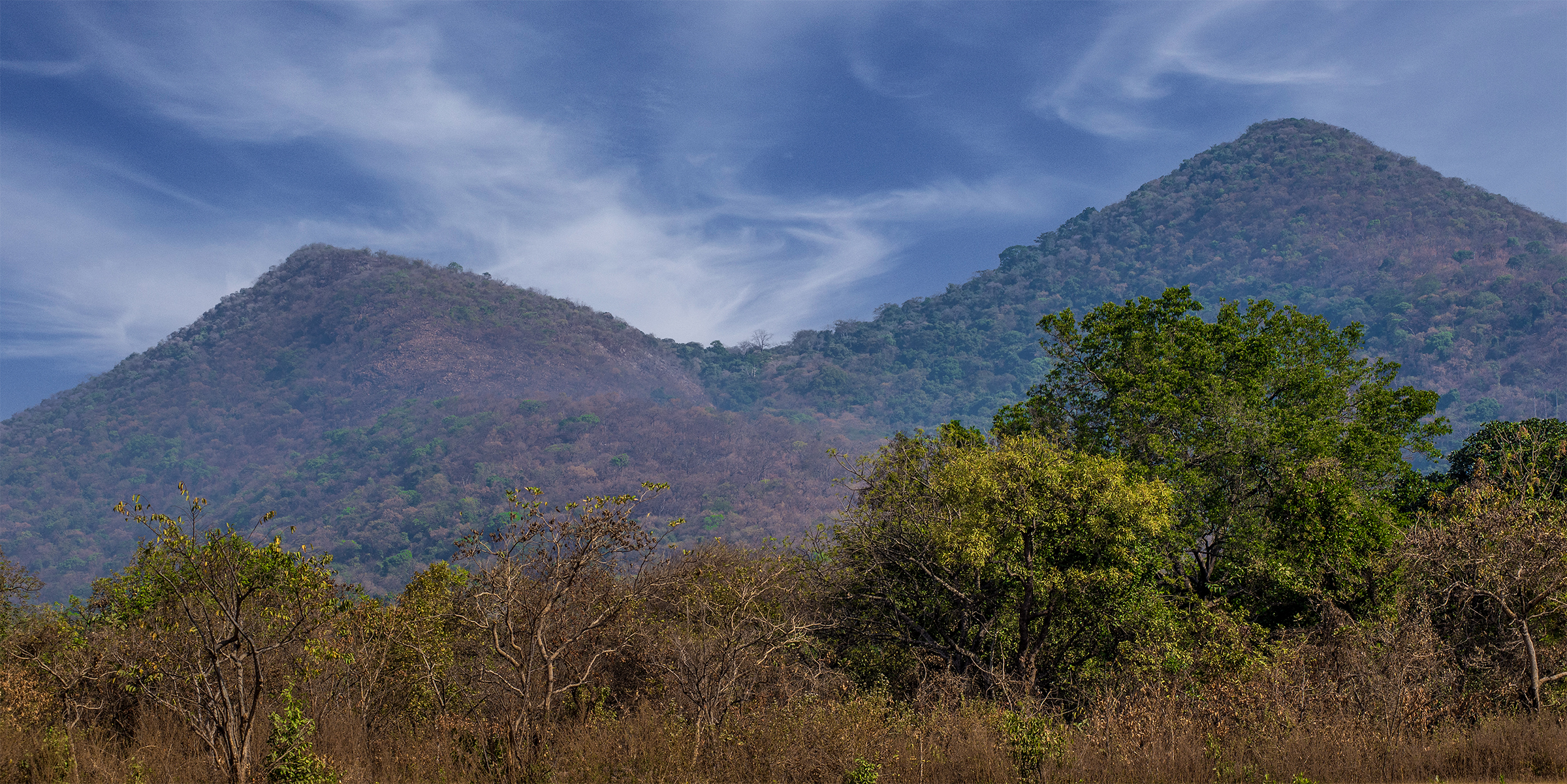
Breast mountain

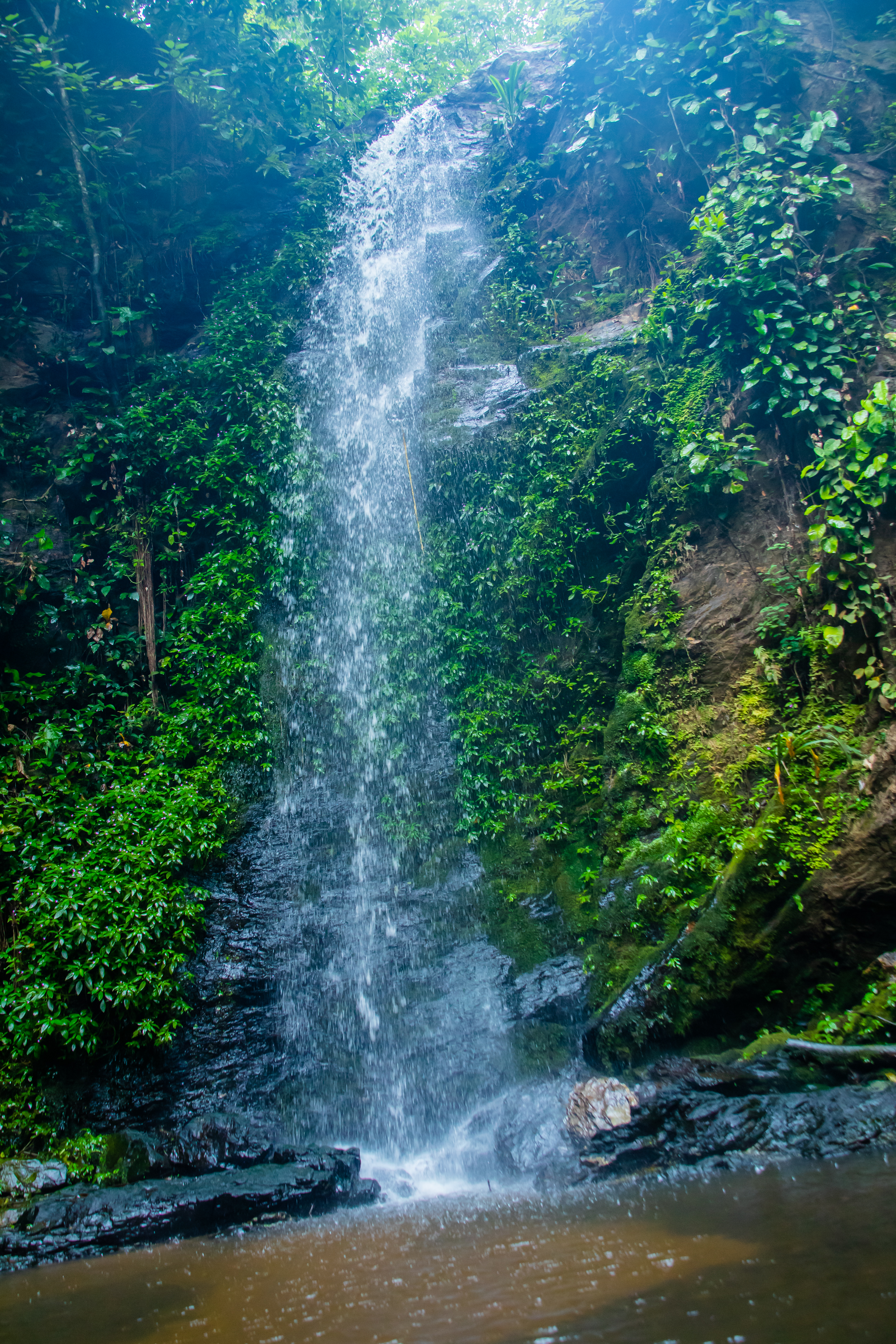
Kyabobo lower fall

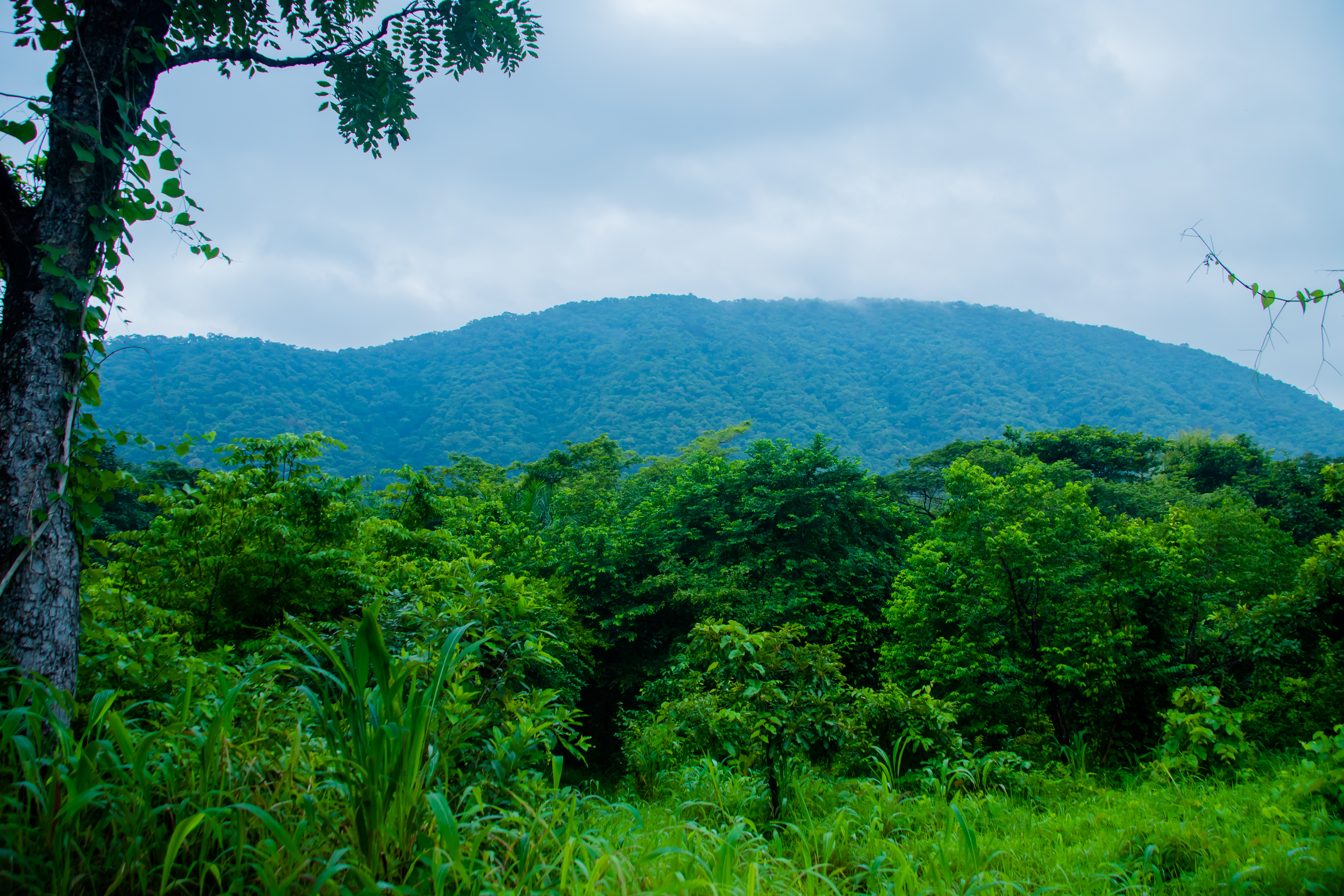
Mountainous view in the park
