= Dormabin =

Community in Oti Region, Ghana

- Location in Ghana
- Coordinates: 7°50′17″N 0°18′30″E
- Country: Ghana
- Region: Oti Region
- District: Krachi East Municipal

Dormabin is a farming community in the Krachi East Municipal in the Oti Region of Ghana. It was formerly in the Volta Region.

== Institution ==
- Dormabin Municipal Assembly Primary School
