= John Oti Bless =

Ghanaian politician

Hon. John Oti Bless MP
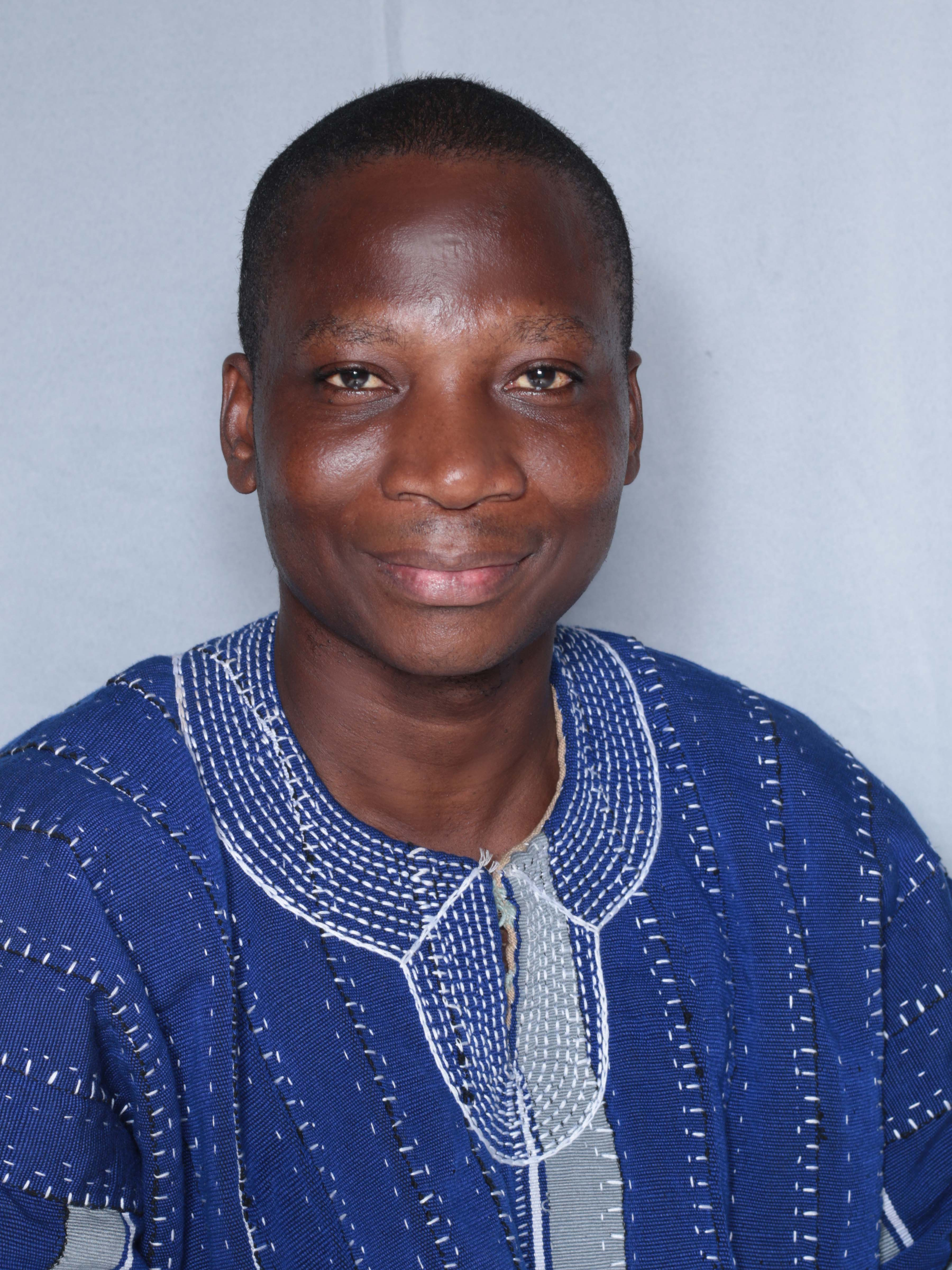

Member of the Ghana Parliament for Nkwanta North Constituency
- Incumbent
- Assumed office 2013

Deputy Local government and Rural development
- In office 2016–2017
- President: John Dramani Mahama

Personal details
- Born: John Oti Bless; 19 October 1979 (age 46) Ghana
- Party: National Democratic Congress
- Education: University of Ghana
- Committees: Government Assurance Committee Food, Agriculture and Cocoa Affairs Committee

John Oti Bless (born Friday, October 19, 1979) is a Ghanaian politician and member of the Seventh Parliament of the Fourth Republic of Ghana representing the Nkwanta North Constituency in the Oti Region on the ticket of the National Democratic Congress.

== Early life and education ==
He hails from Saboba, a town in the Northern Region of Ghana. He entered the University of Ghana and obtained his Diploma in Youth Development in 2002. He also holds an MA in Public Affairs (Public Affairs).

== Career ==
Bless is a member of the National Democratic Congress. In 2012, he contested for the Nkwanta North seat on the ticket of the NDC sixth parliament of the fourth republic and won.

=== Politics ===
- Deputy Minister for local government and rural development, October 27, 2016 – January 6, 2017
- Member of Parliament (January 7, 2013 – present; 3rd term)
- He is also a Ranking Member of the Government Assurance Committee in the Ghanaian Parliament.
- He also serves as a member of the Roads and Transport Committee in Parliament.

=== Other Employment ===
MD, Blessed Pharmacy/Blessed cleansing services, Accra.

== Personal life ==
He married his wife Sika in 2018 and has four children.
