= Krachi West District =

Krachi West Municipal District Krachi Ouest
- District
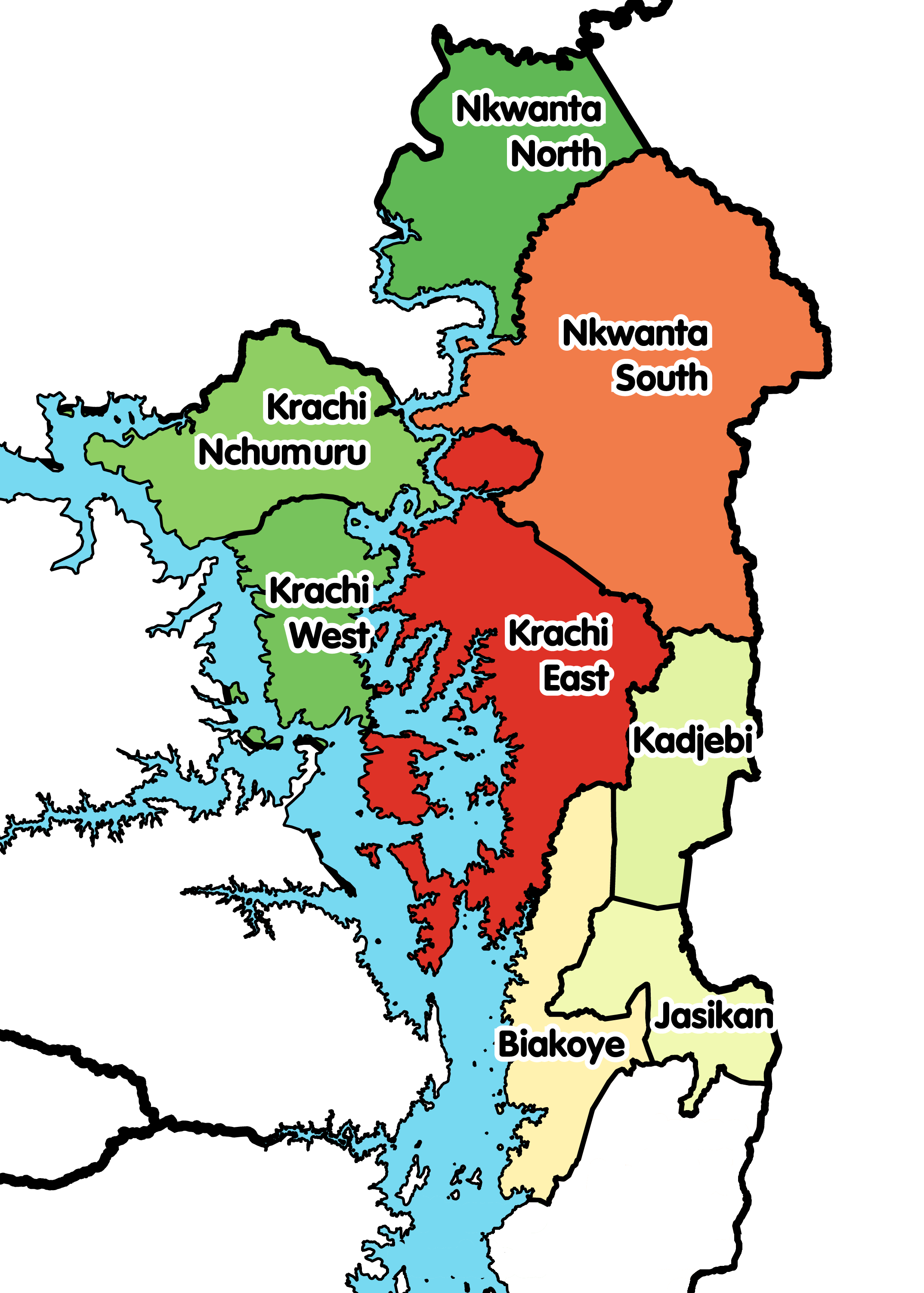
- Districts of Oti Region

- Location of Krachi West District within Oti
- Coordinates: 7°48′7.2″N 0°3′3.6″W
- Country: Ghana
- Region: Oti
- Capital: Kete Krachi

Government
  - District Executive: Kwame Ponye

Area
  - Total: 4,169 km^{2} (1,610 sq mi)

Population (2021)
  - Total: 61,128
- Time zone: UTC+0 (GMT)
- ISO 3166 code: GH-OT-KW

Krachi West Municipal District is one of the nine districts in Oti Region, Ghana. Originally it was formerly part of the then-larger Krachi District on 10 March 1989, which was established by Legislative Instrument (L.I.) 1501, until the eastern part of the district was split off to create Krachi East District on 4 August 2004 (which was layerelevated to municipal district assembly status to become Krachi East Municipal District on 14 November 2017 (effectively 15 March 2018); which was established by Legislative Instrument (L.I.) 2281), which was established by Legislative Instrument (L.I.) 1747; thus the remaining part has been renamed to become Krachi West District. However, on 28 June 2012, the northern part of the district was split off to create Krachi Nchumuru District, which was established by Legislative Instrument (L.I.) 2078; thus the remaining part has been retained as Krachi West District. It was elevated to municipal status on 11th May, 2021. The district assembly is located in the northern part of Oti Region and has Kete Krachi as its capital town.

== Location and geography ==
=== Location ===
Krachi West District is surrounded by Nkwanta North District to the east, Nkwanta South District is to the south, and Kadjebi District is to the west.

== Villages ==
In addition to Kete Krachi, the capital and administrative centre, Krachi West District contains the following villages:

- Akaniem
- Ayinamae
- Bajamse
- Banda
- Bidi
- Boafri
- Bommoden
- Borae No. 2
- Chayo
- Chinderi
- Dadekro
- Dadoto
- Ehiamankyene
- Grubi
- Osramani
- Zongo Marcheri
- Ntewusae (mainly kabyes and kaakyes)

== See also ==
- "Districts of Ghana". Statoids.
- Krachi West District at GhanaDistricts.com
