= Krachi East Municipal District =

- Municipal District
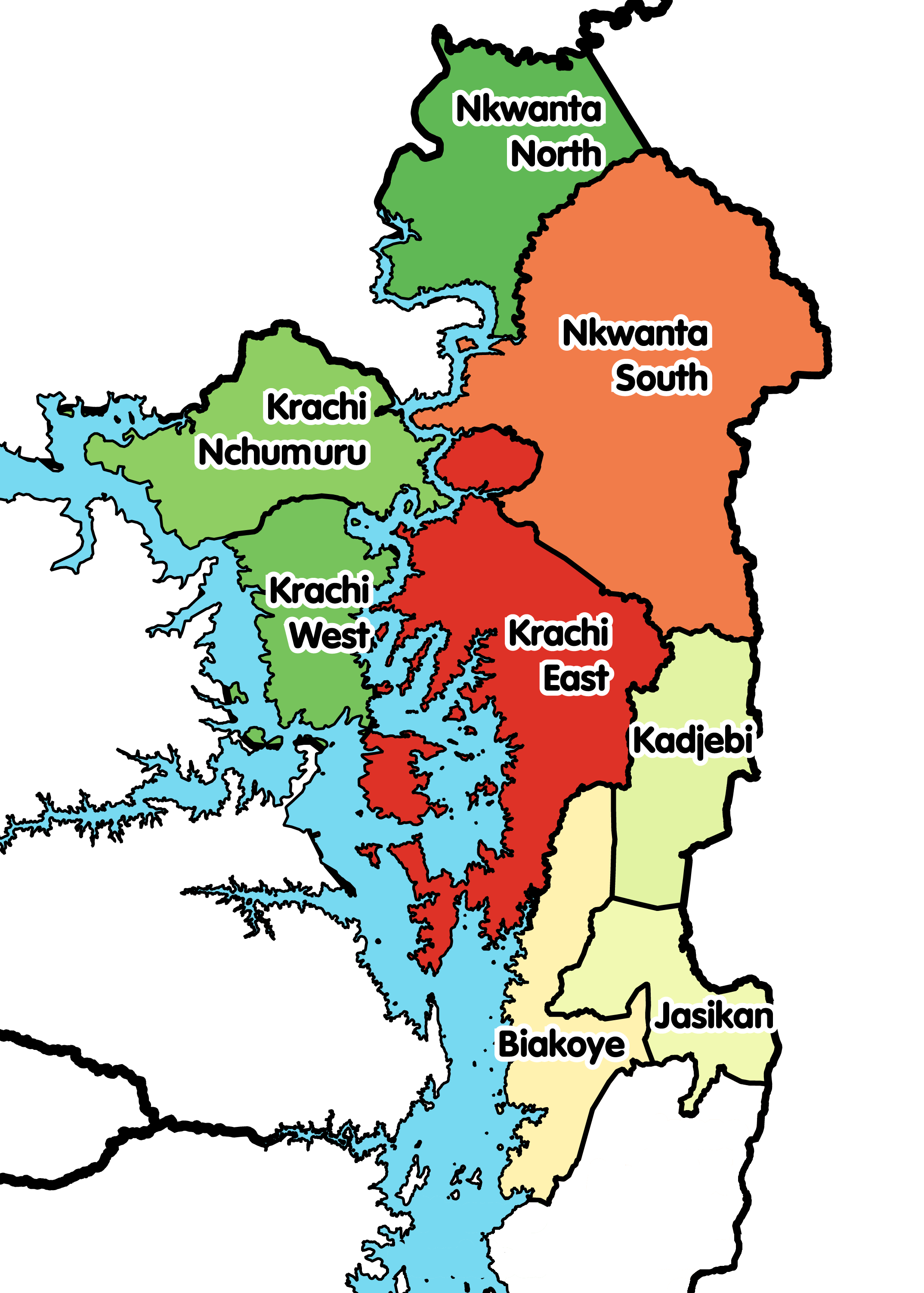
- Districts of Oti Region

- Location of Krachi East Municipal District within Oti
- Coordinates: 8°4′8.4″N 0°10′48″E
- Country: Ghana
- Region: Oti
- Capital: Dambai

Government
  - Municipal Chief Executive: Rapheal Kofi Ogyemoko

Area
  - Total: 2,528 km^{2} (976 sq mi)

Population (2021)
  - Total: 110,435
- Time zone: UTC+0 (GMT)
- ISO 3166 code: GH-OT-KE

Krachi East Municipal District is one of the nine districts in Oti Region, Ghana. Originally it was formerly part of the then-larger Krachi District on 1988, until the eastern part of the district was split off to create Krachi East District on 19 August 2004, which was established by Legislative Instrument (L.I.) 1755; thus the remaining part has been renamed to become Krachi West District. However, on 14 November 2017 (effectively 15 March 2018), it was later elevated to municipal district assembly status to become Krachi East Municipal District; which was established by Legislative Instrument (L.I.) 2281. The municipality is located in the northern part of Oti Region and has Dambai as its capital town.

== Location ==
Krachi East District is surrounded by the Nkwanta South District and Nkwanta North District to the north, the Kadjebi District to the east, the new Krachi District and the Volta Lake to the west and the Jasikan District to the south.

== Villages ==
In addition to Dambai, the capital and administrative centre, Krachi East District contains the following villages:

- Addo-Nkwanta
- Asukawkaw
- Dormabin
- Kparekpare
- Pai-katanga
- Tokuroano
Kpelema

Nantwi-akura

Njare

Ayeremu

== See also ==
- "Districts of Ghana". Statoids.
- GhanaDistricts.com
