= Kwadjokrom =

- Town
- Location of Kwadjokrom in Bono East region, Ghana
- Coordinates: 7°46′N 0°10′W
- Country: Ghana
- Region: Bono East region
- District: Sene District
- Time zone: GMT
  - Summer (DST): GMT

Kwadjokrom is a small town and is the capital of Sene District in the Bono Eat region of Ghana. Kwadjokrom is in the east of Bono East region, and is situated by Lake Volta. Kwadjokrom is connected by road highway to Ejura and Yeji. Kwadjokrom is connected by a ferry to the town of Kete Krachi.
