= Dafor, Ghana =

Dafor
- Village
- Location within Ghana
- Coordinates: 6°58′N 0°30′E
- Country: Ghana
- Region: Volta Region
- District: Biakoye District
- Time zone: GMT
  - Summer (DST): GMT

Dafor is a village in the Biakoye district of the Volta Region of Ghana.
