= Chinderi =

- District Capital
- Location of Chinderi
- Coordinates: 8°8′36.4″N 0°9′5.1″W
- Country: Ghana
- Region: Oti Region
- District: Krachi Nchumuru
- Elevation: 98 m (322 ft)
- Time zone: GMT
  - Summer (DST): GMT
- Area codes: for multiple area codes

Chinderi is the capital town of the Krachi Nchumuru district in the Oti Region of Ghana.

== Location ==
Chinderi is 6.5 nautical miles to the west of Borae and further still from Kwadjobri. To the south are Buafori and Bagjamse. Its western neighbours include Guibi and Kaniem. Towns to the north include Burai, Bachin Gulubi, Boral Wiae and Kpandai.

== See also ==
- Krachi Nchumuru (district)
- Krachi Nchumuru (Ghana parliament constituency)

== External links and sources ==
- Krachi Nchumuru District Official website
