= Nkonya Ahenkro =

- District Capital
- Location of Nkonya Ahenkro
- Coordinates: 07°06′59″N 00°19′27″E
- Country: Ghana
- Region: Oti Region
- District: Biakoye District
- Elevation: 153 m (502 ft)

Population (2019)
  - Total: 80,813
- Time zone: GMT
  - Summer (DST): GMT

Nkonya Ahenkro is a small town and is the capital of Biakoye district, a district in the Oti Region of Ghana. This name could be derived from African Brazilian or Haitian Brazilian due to slavery.

== Geography ==
=== Location ===
Nkonya Ahenkro is bounded to the east by the village of Hohoe and to the south by the village of Dafor. It has ten subdivided towns that begin with Asakyiri when entering the town from Kpando, then Ahondzo, Akloba, Owulibito, Ntsumru, kedjebi, Ntumda, Tayi, Tepo then finally Wurupong. The language spoken is [Nkonya] with farming and hunting as their main occupation.

== See also ==
- Biakoye District
- Biakoye (Ghana parliament constituency)

== External links and sources ==
- Biakoye District on GhanaDistricts.com
