= John Majisi =

Ghanaian politician (born 1956)

Member of the Ghana Parliament for Krachi Nchumuru Constituency

Personal details
- Born: 11 March 1956 (age 70)
- Party: National Democratic Congress

John Majisi (born 11 March 1956) is a Ghanaian politician and member of the Seventh Parliament of the Fourth Republic of Ghana representing the Krachi Nchumuru constituency in the Volta Region, on the ticket of the National Democratic Congress.

== Personal life ==
Majisi is a Christian (Seventh-day Adventist). He is married (with seven children).

== Early life and education ==
Majisi was born on 11 March 1956. He hails from Boafri, a town in the Volta Region of Ghana. He entered the University of Education, Winneba and obtained his MPhil in Special Education in 2007.

== Politics ==
Majisi is a member of the National Democratic Congress (NDC). In 2012, he contested for the Krachi Nchumuru seat on the ticket of the NDC sixth parliament of the fourth republic and won.

=== 2012 election ===
Majisi contested the Karich Nchumuru parliamentary seat on the ticket of the National Democratic Congress during the 2012 Ghanaian general election and won the election with 14,049 votes representing 60.85% of the total votes. He won the election over Kofi Tarkom Taylor of the New Patriotic Party who polled 8,769 votes which is equivalent to 37.98%, parliamentary candidate for the Convention People's Party Ogyemeaye John Kwasi had 168 votes representing 0.73% and Adomako Quainoo Samuel of NDP had 101 votes representing 0.44% of the total votes.

==== 2016 election ====
Majisi was re-elected as a member of parliament for Krachi Nchumuru constituency on the ticket of the National Democratic Congress during the 2016 Ghanaian general election. He won the election with 11,833 votes representing 50.75%. He was elected over Kakateche Innocent Tache of the New Patriotic Party, Mohammed Abdallah (IND) and John Kwasi Ogyemekye of the Convention People's Party. They obtained 10, 856 votes, 491votes and 138 votes respectively, equivalent to 46.56%, 2.11% and 0.59% of the total votes respectively.

== Employment ==
- Lecturer, University of Education, Winneba
- Member of Parliament (7 January 2013 – present; 2nd term)
