= Kete Krachi =

Town in Oti Region, Ghana

- District Capital
- Location of Kete Krachi in Oti Region
- Coordinates: 7°48′N 0°01′W
- Country: Ghana
- Region: Oti
- District: Krachi West District

Population (2013)
  - Total: 11,788
- Time zone: GMT
  - Summer (DST): GMT
- postal code: VS

Kete Krachi (formerly Kete Kratje) is a town and the capital of the Krachi West District in the Oti Region of Ghana, adjacent to Lake Volta. Kete-Krachi is connected by a ferry to the town of Kwadjokrom, and by road to Bimbila and Dambai. The town has a population of 11,788 people.

== History ==
The town (the known as Krachikrom) was historically a trading center in the region, selling primarily salt, slaves, and shea butter. Krachikrom combinated with a nearby zongo settlement to formed Kete-Krachi sometime in 1877. Under German rule, tensions between the Islamic and Krachi portions of town grew due to a imbalanced of power.

== Economy ==
The town is mostly dominated by agriculture, counted for about 70% of economic activity. Other economic sectors include commerce and tourism.

== Health ==
Kete-Krachi and the district as a whole is served by the Kete-Krachi district hospital. The facility provides curative care, preventive care and treatment options such as surgeries, laboratory and diagnostic techniques.

== Climate ==
The town has a tropical savanna climate (Köppen climate classification Aw), with a wet and dry season and is hot year-round. The daily mean temperature is 30 °C (86 °F) while the daily mean minimum is 25.5 °C (77.9 °F). The wet season occurs from April to October while the dry season starts in November and ends in March. The mean annual rainfall is 1,300 mm (51 in).

Climate data for Kete Krachi (1991-2020)
| Month | Jan | Feb | Mar | Apr | May | Jun | Jul | Aug | Sep | Oct | Nov | Dec | Year |
|---|---|---|---|---|---|---|---|---|---|---|---|---|---|
| Record high °C (°F) | 38.4 (101.1) | 40.0 (104.0) | 40.6 (105.1) | 38.9 (102.0) | 37.2 (99.0) | 37.2 (99.0) | 33.3 (91.9) | 35.0 (95.0) | 34.0 (93.2) | 35.6 (96.1) | 36.8 (98.2) | 38.5 (101.3) | 40.6 (105.1) |
| Mean daily maximum °C (°F) | 34.7 (94.5) | 36.4 (97.5) | 36.2 (97.2) | 34.5 (94.1) | 33.2 (91.8) | 31.3 (88.3) | 29.9 (85.8) | 29.6 (85.3) | 30.6 (87.1) | 32.3 (90.1) | 34.1 (93.4) | 34.1 (93.4) | 33.1 (91.6) |
| Daily mean °C (°F) | 27.7 (81.9) | 30.2 (86.4) | 31.0 (87.8) | 30.0 (86.0) | 29.1 (84.4) | 27.6 (81.7) | 26.7 (80.1) | 26.4 (79.5) | 26.8 (80.2) | 27.8 (82.0) | 28.6 (83.5) | 27.5 (81.5) | 28.3 (82.9) |
| Mean daily minimum °C (°F) | 20.7 (69.3) | 24.0 (75.2) | 25.8 (78.4) | 25.5 (77.9) | 24.9 (76.8) | 23.9 (75.0) | 23.4 (74.1) | 23.2 (73.8) | 23.1 (73.6) | 23.4 (74.1) | 23.1 (73.6) | 20.9 (69.6) | 23.5 (74.3) |
| Record low °C (°F) | 11.5 (52.7) | 14.5 (58.1) | 18.9 (66.0) | 20.4 (68.7) | 20.0 (68.0) | 19.5 (67.1) | 17.0 (62.6) | 18.5 (65.3) | 19.5 (67.1) | 19.0 (66.2) | 16.0 (60.8) | 10.0 (50.0) | 10.0 (50.0) |
| Average precipitation mm (inches) | 7.9 (0.31) | 14.7 (0.58) | 36.8 (1.45) | 105.2 (4.14) | 122.3 (4.81) | 196.3 (7.73) | 222.2 (8.75) | 206.3 (8.12) | 253.2 (9.97) | 155.1 (6.11) | 23.0 (0.91) | 6.9 (0.27) | 1,349.9 (53.15) |
| Average precipitation days (≥ 1.0 mm) | 0.5 | 1.0 | 2.9 | 5.8 | 7.9 | 11.1 | 11.2 | 11.6 | 14.4 | 9.9 | 1.9 | 0.6 | 78.8 |
| Average relative humidity (%) (at 15:00) | 33 | 31 | 43 | 51 | 58 | 67 | 70 | 68 | 69 | 62 | 52 | 41 | 54 |
| Mean monthly sunshine hours | 223.2 | 228.8 | 244.9 | 225.0 | 248.0 | 180.0 | 139.5 | 155.0 | 135.0 | 229.4 | 264.0 | 254.2 | 2,527 |
| Mean daily sunshine hours | 7.2 | 8.1 | 7.9 | 7.5 | 8.0 | 6.0 | 4.5 | 5.0 | 4.5 | 7.4 | 8.8 | 8.2 | 6.9 |
Source 1: NOAA
Source 2: Deutscher Wetterdienst (humidity 1953-1962, sun 1958-1962)

== Notable residents ==
- Joseph Kodzo, educationist and politician

== See also ==
- Salaga, Ghana
- Lake Volta
