= Kpeme =

Alavanyo Kpeme
- Village
- Location within Ghana
- Coordinates: 7°07′N 0°21′E
- Country: Ghana
- Region: Volta Region
- District: Hohoe
- Elevation: 696 ft (212 m)
- Time zone: GMT
  - Summer (DST): GMT

Alavanyo Kpeme is a village in the Hohoe District of the Volta Region of Ghana.
