= Nkwanta District =

- Former District
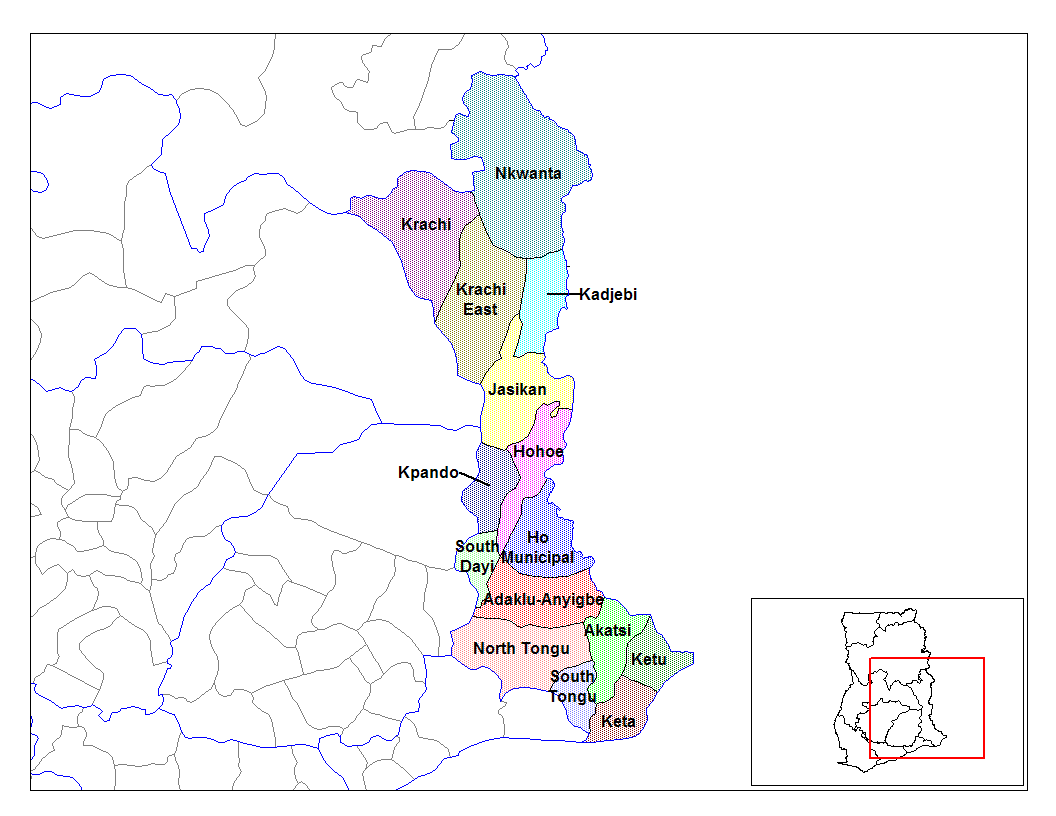
- Districts of Volta Region

- Location of Nkwanta District within Volta
- Coordinates: 8°15′25.92″N 0°31′6.96″E
- Country: Ghana
- Region: Volta
- Capital: Nkwanta
- Time zone: UTC+0 (GMT)
- ISO 3166 code: GH-TV-NK

Nkwanta District is a former district that was located in Volta Region (now part of Oti Region), Ghana. Nkwanta District was carved out of the former Kete-Krachi District in 1989 and was established under Legislative Instrument (L.I.) 1496. In 2007, following the passing of Legislative Instrument (L.I.) 1846, the Nkwanta District was split into Nkwanta North and Nkwanta South District was elevated to municipal district assembly status on 14 November 2017, effective 15 March 2018, becoming Nkwanta South Municipal District under L.I. 2283. capital: Nkwanta) and Nkwanta North District (capital: Kpassa). The district assembly was located in the northern part of Volta Region and had Nkwanta as its capital town.
