= Biakoye District =

- District
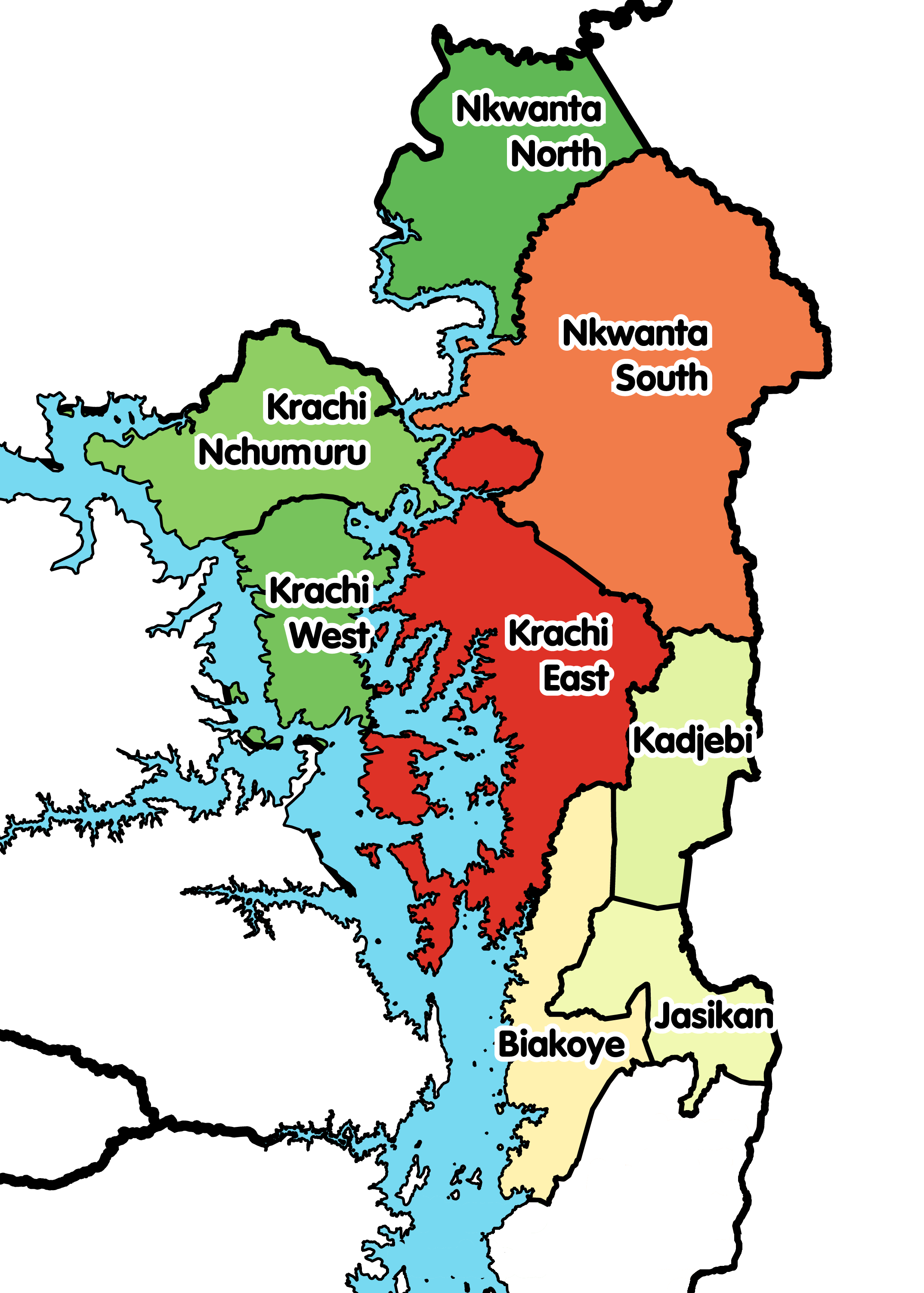
- Districts of Oti Region

- Location of Biakoye District within Oti
- Coordinates: 7°6′59″N 0°19′27″E
- Country: Ghana
- Region: Oti
- Capital: Nkonya Ahenkro

Government
  - MP: Hon. Jean Marie-Formadi

Population (2021)
  - Total: 71,827
- Time zone: UTC+0 (GMT)
- ISO 3166 code: GH-OT-BI

Biakoye District is one of the nine districts in the Oti Region, Ghana. Originally it was formerly part of the then-larger Jasikan District on 10 March 1989, which was created from the former Jasikan District Council, until the western part of the district was split off to create Biakoye District on 29 February 2008, which was established by Legislative Instrument (L.I.) 1910; thus the remaining part has been retained as Jasikan District. The district assembly is located in the southern part of the Oti Region and has Nkonya Ahenkro as its capital town.

Jean-Marie Formadi is the current member of parliament for the Biakoye constituency under the ticket of the National Democratic Congress (NDC). She polled 17,760 valid votes, representing 63.7 percent, as against 9,696 votes, representing 34.8 percent, secured by Dr. Frank Yirenkyi of the New Patriotic Party (NPP) during the 2024 Ghanaian general election.

- Apesokubi
- Tapa Abotoase
- Tapa Amanya
- Tapa Amanfrom
- Dedekrom
- Oyiran
- Bowiri Amanfrom
- Bowiri Kyirahin
- Takrabe
- Aboabo Abohire
- Takrabe
- Anlokodzi
- Bongo
- Odumase
- Bowiri Kofzi
- Bowiri New-Kwamekrom
- Nkonya Tepo
- Nkonya Ntumda
- Nkonya Kadjebi
- Nikonya Tayi
- Nkonya Ntsumuru
- Nkonya Ahenkro
- Nkonya Akloba
- Asakyiri
- Ahundwo
- Nkonya Bumbulla Adenkesu
- Nkonya
- Wurupong
- Awerekyekye
- Gyamerakrom
- Osoroasuom
- Kotomase
- Worawora

== Notable people ==
A notable citizen of the District is Ave K. Kludze, a NASA rocket scientist who was honoured at the village of Gbi Kpeme, near Nkonya Ahenkro, during a festival.
