= Dambai =

City in Oti Region, Ghana

- Regional Capital
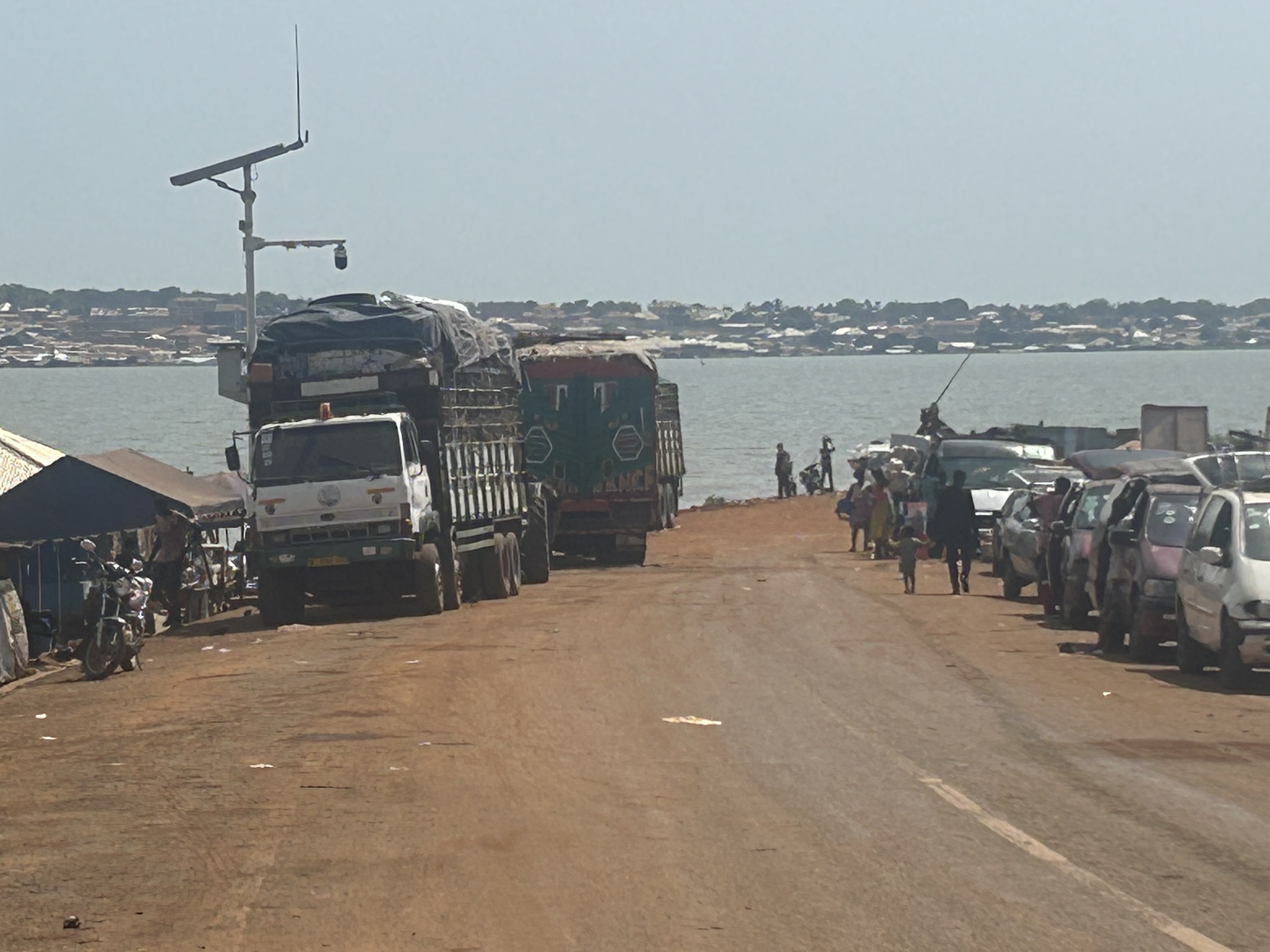
- Ferry terminal near Oti River at Dambai

- Location of Dambai in Oti Region
- Coordinates: 08°04′08″N 0°10′45″E
- Country: Ghana
- Region: Oti Region
- District: Krachi East District
- Elevation: 364 ft (111 m)
- Time zone: GMT
  - Summer (DST): GMT
- postal code: VR
- Area code: 036

Dambai is a city and the capital of the Oti Region of Ghana.

== Geography ==
=== Location ===
Dambai is the capital of the Oti Region. It is located on the eastern side of the Oti River, a tributary of the Volta Lake. It was declared the capital of the region which was carved out of the existing Volta Region. It was given the Legislative Instruments as capital by President Nana Akuffo Addo on 15 February 2019 after it was chosen to be the capital. It is located in the heart of the Savannah Accelerated Development Authority (SADA) area.

== Flora and fauna ==
The outskirts of Dambai contain wild animals such as lions and elephants, duikers, cobs, several marine and land snakes such as vipers, and pythons, and buffalo. Fish in the lake include tilapia, cat fish, Nile perch, electric fish, puff fish. There are several types of oysters and clams as well as several types of crocodiles including the Nile crocodile.

== Economy ==
The occupation of the inhabitants is farming and fishing on the River Oti with few inhabitants being employed by offices of the district assembly and teaching Education.

The town has a teachers' training school, Dambai College of Education, and several second cycle schools. In 2013, another teacher training school and a nursing school, Aim Professional Training College and Mon Reve Institute, were established.

The town has a number of senior high schools as well. They include Oti Senior High, Yabram Community Day Senior High and many others.

== Culture ==
Several tribes can be found in Dambai. The Nchumuru people are divided into 7 main clans: Kachenki, Susuro, Munkuri, Agyimbra, Abraman, Boyayi, and Wankanyaw. Other tribes are the Nawuri who can be identified into Njare, Kitare, Balai and Kabonwule clans and are mainly farmers and traders. The Kaachi, Addele, Akans, Ada, and Battor form other tribal groups in Dambai. The latter two groups monopolize the fishing industry on the Oti River. A litany of minor groups includes, the Kotokoli, Konkomba and the Basari who are farmers as well. Several Fulani pastoralist families are scatered in the Dambai-Njare wilderness.

The indigenous people observe the Kipor Day every 6 days. It is equivalent to the Jewish Sabbath: on this day no one is expected to go to farm or engage in activities deemed to be farming, and this is strictly enforced. Young people are placed on guard to arrest those who break this rule, who are made to pay fines of sheep or goat and liquor that are sacrificed to the ancestors.

There is also the Fofie day, which falls on Friday. There are a lot of sacrifices to ancestors.

The Dambai Nchumurus have one of the most elaborate dance forms. These are normally for funerals. Sukudai is a funeral dance for elders, particularly clan heads and famous hunters. There is also Mbofou for hunters when they kill big game. Nchuso, meaning water dance, is for the ordinary Nchumuru man or woman when they die. Atokoiatokoi is a dance for elderly women or headwomen of a clan.
