= Krachi Nchumuru (district) =

Krachi Nchumuru District
- District
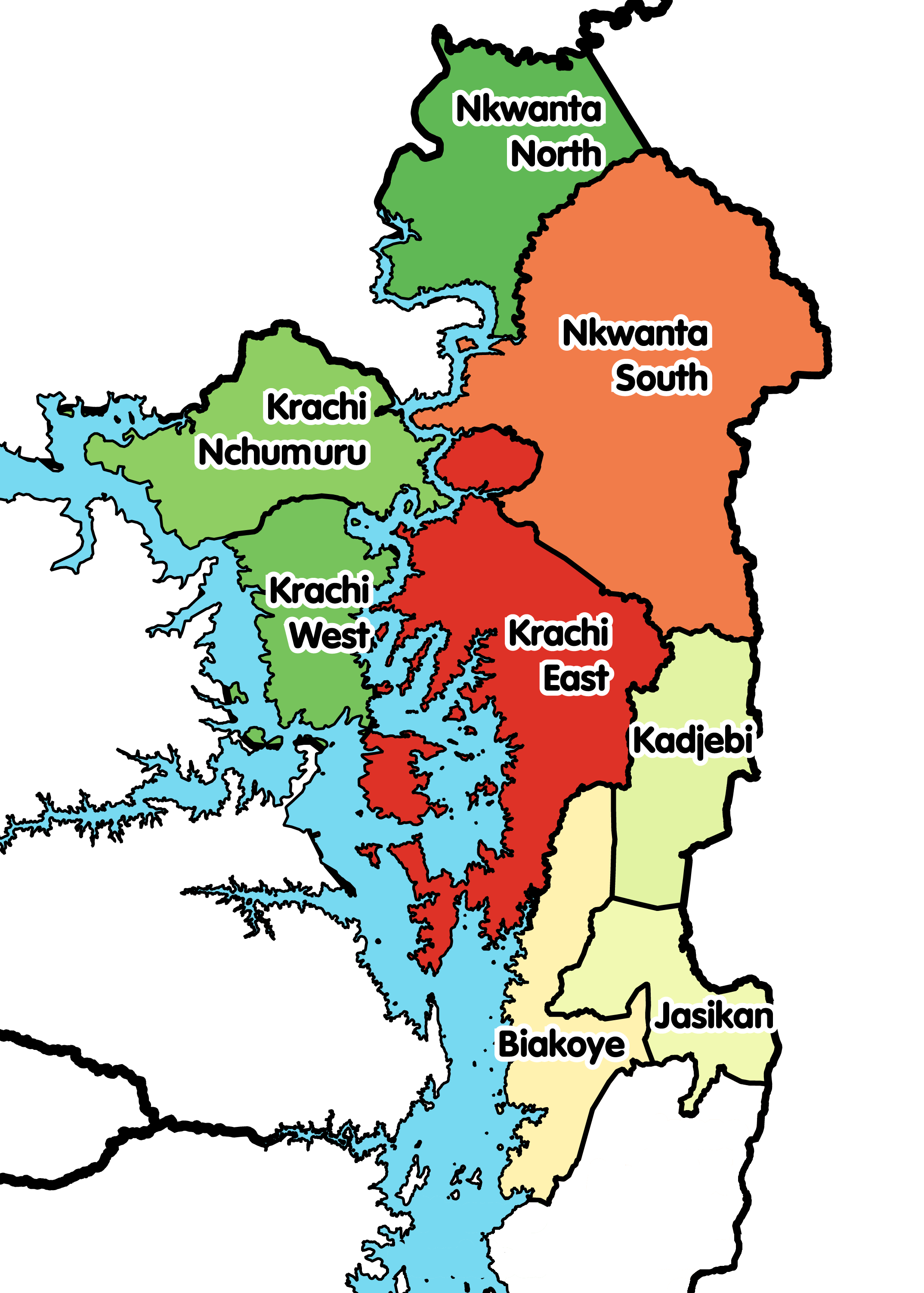
- Districts of Oti Region

- Location of Krachi Nchumuru District within Oti
- Coordinates: 8°8′0″N 0°9′0″W
- Country: Ghana
- Region: Oti
- Capital: Chinderi

Population (2021)
  - Total: 79,934
- Time zone: UTC+0 (GMT)
- ISO 3166 code: GH-OT-KN

Krachi Nchumuru District is one of the nine districts in Oti Region, Ghana. Originally it was formerly part of Krachi West District on 4 August 2004, which was established by Legislative Instrument (L.I.) 1747. until the northern part of the district was split off to create Krachi Nchumuru District on 28 June 2012, which was established by Legislative Instrument (L.I.) 2084; thus the remaining part has been retained as Krachi West District. The district assembly is located in the northern part of Oti Region and has Chinderi as its capital town.
