= Nkwanta South Municipal District =

Nkwanta South Municipal Assembly Assemblée municipale de Nkwanta Sud
- Municipal District
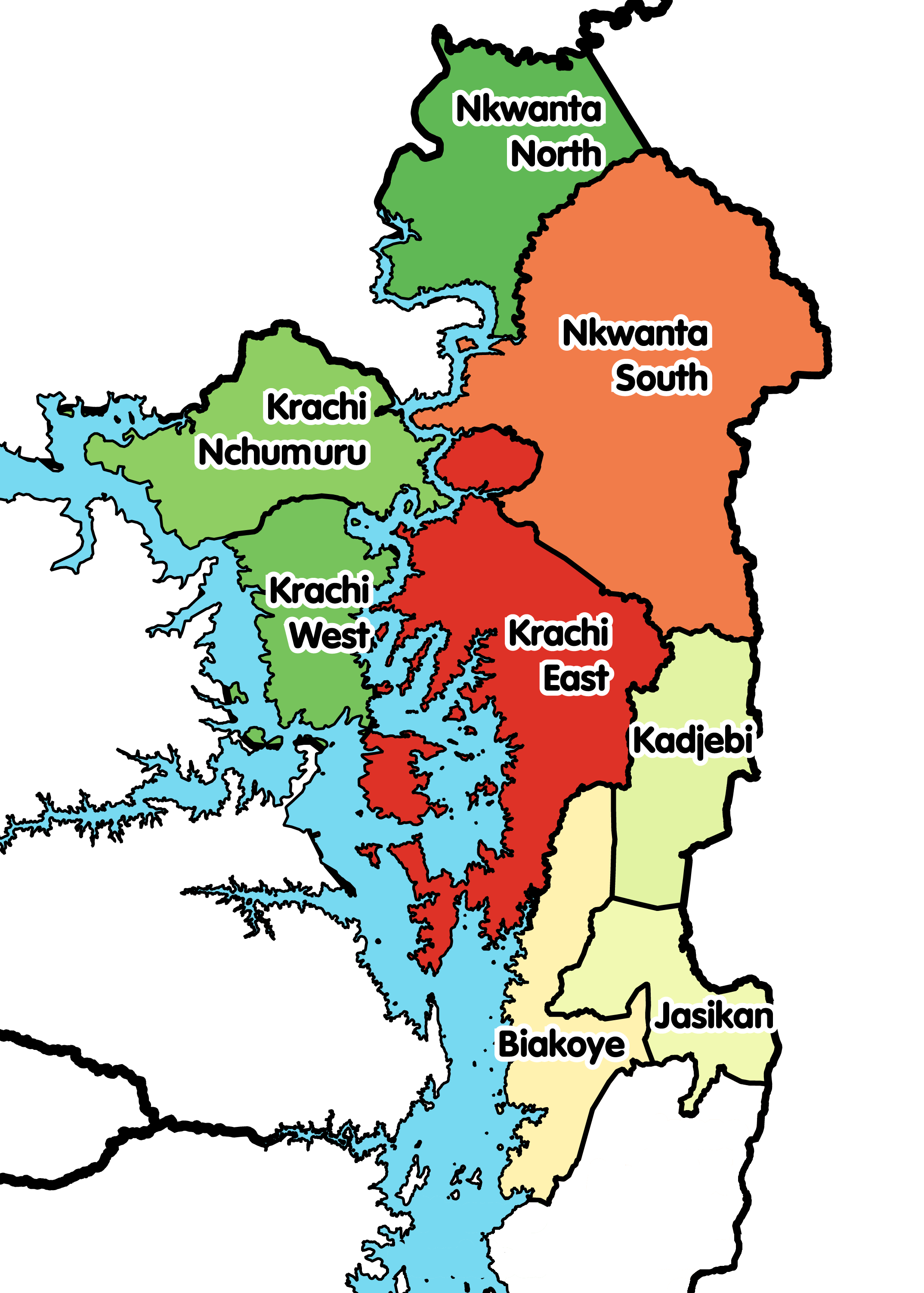
- Districts of Oti Region

- Location of Nkwanta South Municipal District within Oti
- Coordinates: 8°15′25.92″N 0°31′6.96″E
- Country: Ghana
- Region: Oti
- Capital: Nkwanta

Government
  - Municipal Chief Executive: Joseph Nyofam Ninkab

Population (2021)
  - Total: 135,936
- Time zone: UTC+0 (GMT)
- ISO 3166 code: GH-OT-NS

Nkwanta South Municipal Assembly (French: Nkwanta Sud) is one of the nine districts in Oti Region, Ghana. Originally it was formerly part of the then-larger Nkwanta District on 10 March 1989, which was established by Legislative Instrument (L.I.) 1496, until the northern part of the district was split off to create Nkwanta North District on 29 February 2008, which was established by Legislative Instrument (L.I.) 1892; thus the remaining part has been renamed to become Nkwanta South District. However, on 14 November 2017 (effectively 15 March 2018), it was later elevated to municipal district assembly status to become Nkwanta South Municipal District; which was established by Legislative Instrument (L.I.) 2283. The municipality is located in the northern part of Oti Region and has Nkwanta as its capital town.

== Villages ==
In addition to Nkwanta, the capital and administrative centre, Nkwanta South Municipality contains the following villages:

- Gekrong
- Bonakye
- lebon
- Siban
- Bontibor
- Akonsigewi
- Brewaniase
- Shiare
- Chillinga
- Kabre Akura
- Kecheibi
- Kanba
- Keri
- Odumasi
- Kromase
- Ofosu
- Abrewankor
- Pawa
- Kue
- Odomi
- Krachi – Akura
- Nabu
- New Agou
- Kenyintan
- Nsuogya (Asodja)
- Nyambong
- Bontibor
- Pusupu
- Kpabo Akura
- Sibi Central
- Anebogewi
- Sibi Hill Top
- Tinjase
- Okata
- Kabiti

== Sources ==
- "Districts of Ghana". Statoids.
- Nkwanta South Municipal District on GhanaDistricts.com
