= Nkwanta North District =

Nkwanta North District Nkwanta Nord
- District
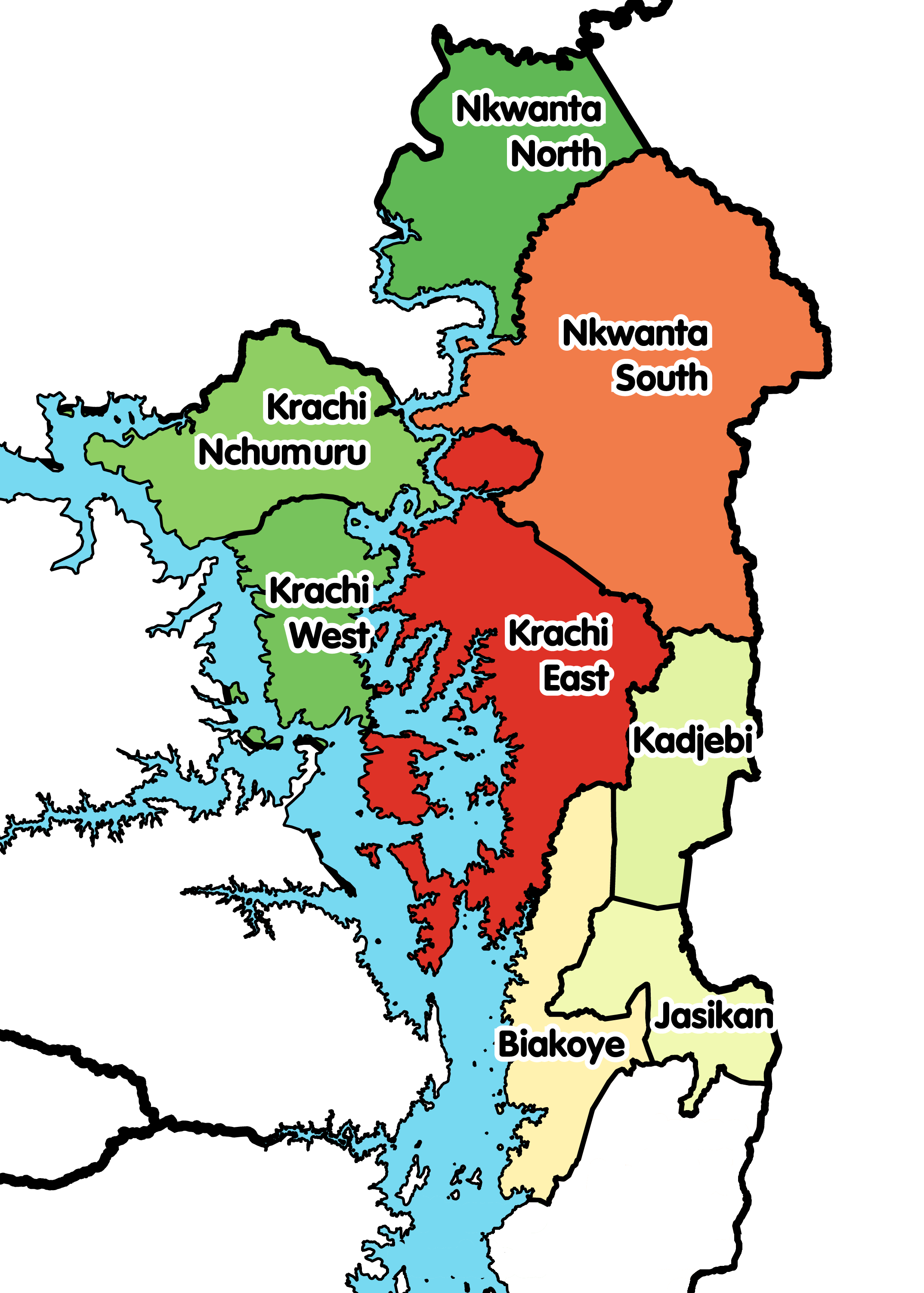
- Districts of Oti Region

- Location of Nkwanta North District within Oti
- Coordinates: 8°29′22.56″N 0°18′15.48″E
- Country: Ghana
- Region: Oti
- Capital: Kpassa

Government
  - District Executive: Paul Levin Gyato

Population (2021)
  - Total: 126,096
- Time zone: UTC+0 (GMT)
- ISO 3166 code: GH-OT-NN

Nkwanta North District (French: Nkwanta Nord) is one of the nine (9) districts in Oti Region, Ghana. Originally it was formerly part of the then-larger Nkwanta District on 10 March 1989, until the northern part of the district was split off to create Nkwanta North District on 29 February 2008, which was established by Legislative Instrument (L.I.) 1846; thus the remaining part has been renamed to become Nkwanta South District, which was later elevated to municipal district assembly status on 14 November 2017 (effectively 15 March 2018) to become Nkwanta South Municipal District; which was established by Legislative Instrument (L.I.) 2283. The district assembly is located in the northern part of Oti Region and has Kpassa as its capital town.

== See also ==
- "Districts of Ghana". Statoids.
- Nkwanta North District at GhanaDistricts.com
