= Nkwanta =

- District Capital
- Location of Nkwanta
- Coordinates: 8°16′N 0°31′E
- Country: Ghana
- Region: Oti Region
- District: Nkwanta South District
- Elevation: 200 m (660 ft)
- Time zone: GMT
  - Summer (DST): GMT

Nkwanta is a town and it’s the district capital of Nkwanta South Municipal District, a municipal in the Oti Region of Ghana.

== Education ==
Nkwanta is currently known for numerous basic schools and 4 major second-cycle institutions namely; Nkwanta Senior High School, Nkwanta Community Senior High Technical School, Kyabobo Girls' School and Mist Senior High Technical School.

== See also ==
- Nkwanta South District
- Nkwanta South (Ghana parliament constituency)

== External links and sources ==
- Nkwanta South District on GhanaDistricts.com
