= Oti Region =

Region of Ghana

Coordinates: 7°54′N 0°18′E

Oti Region Région d'Oti Oti Nutome
- Region
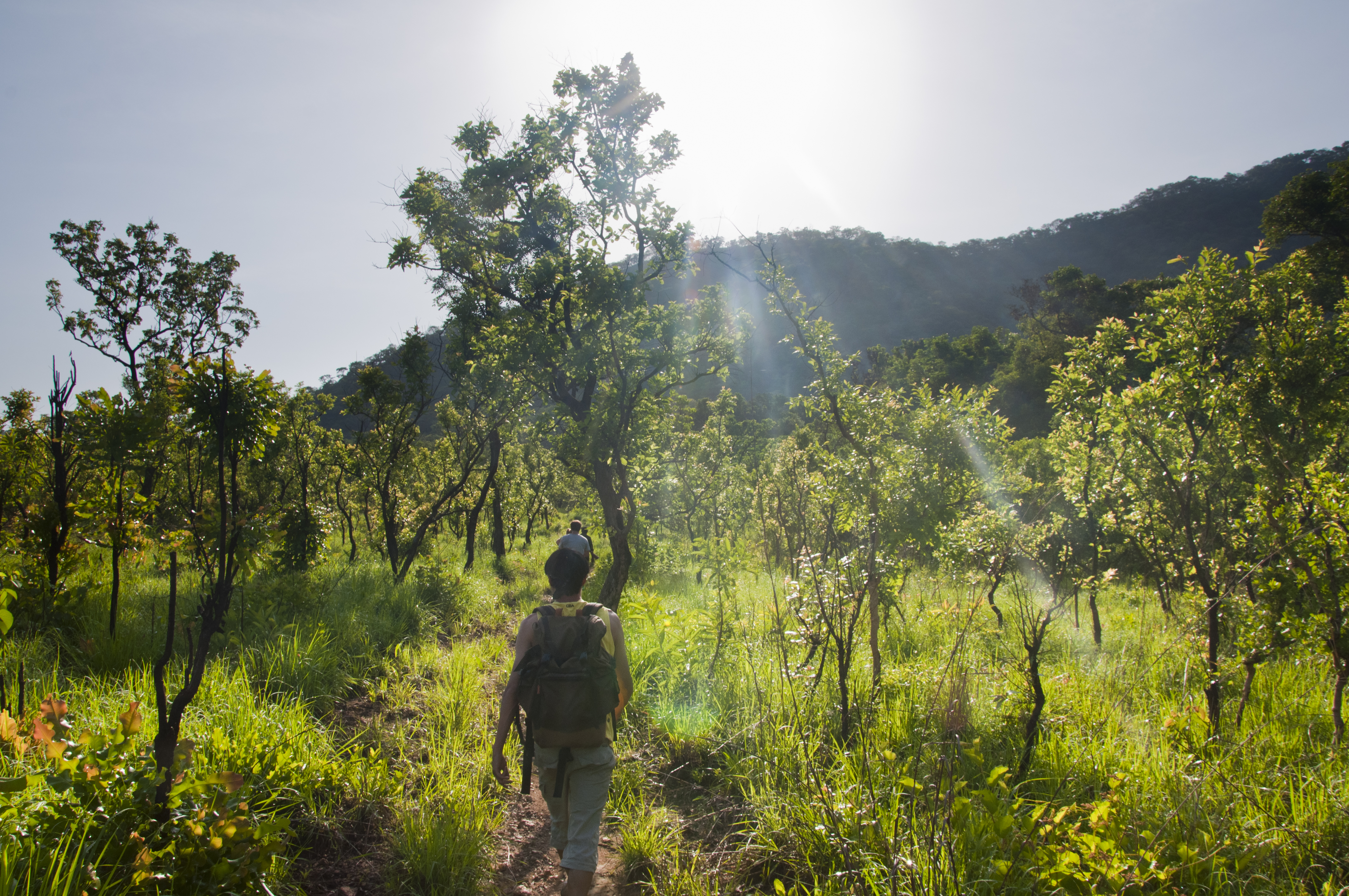
- Kyabobo National Park near the border with Togo

- Location of Oti Region in Ghana
- Country: Ghana
- Capital: Dambai
- Districts: 9

Government
  - Regional Minister: John Kwadwo Gyapong

Area
  - Total: 11,066 km^{2} (4,273 sq mi)

Population (2021)
  - Total: 747,248
  - Density: 67/km^{2} (170/sq mi)
- Time zone: GMT
- Area code: 031
- ISO 3166 code: GH-OT

The Oti Region is one of the six newly created regions of Ghana and was carved out of the Volta Region in December 2018. This followed the campaign promise of Nana Akufo-Addo to create new regions in order to bring governance closer to the people. The region was inaugurated on May 14, 2019 with Dambai as its capital.

== History ==
The execution of plans for the creation of the regions was ceded to the newly created Ministry of Regional Reorganization and Development which is under the leadership of Hon. Dan Botwe. Government of Ghana ministry charged with the responsibility of supervising the creation of new regions in Ghana. In March 2017, the ministry sent the blue print for the creation of the region along with others to the Council of State. The council met over 36 times from the time of submission to August 2017. The final stage for the creation of the region was decided through a referendum by the people within the catchment of the new region. A referendum on 27 December 2018 approved the creation of Oti Region. On election day, 323,708 out of 366,481 (88.33% voter turnout) registered voters cast their votes. A total of 319,296 (98.64 per cent) voted Yes and 2,878 voted No (0.89 per cent) while the number of rejected ballots was 951 (0.24 per cent).

== Languages ==
In the Oti Region of Ghana, the major languages spoken include French, English, Akposo, Guan, Twi (a dialect of Akan), and Ewe, with other languages like Dagbani, Dagaare, Konkomba, Kotokoli, Nawdm, Hausa and Kabre are also present.

French: A member of the Romance languages, all communities in this region spoke this language.

English: A member of the Germanic languages, it is the official language of Ghana.

Guan: The Guan-speaking tribes include Akposo, Nawuri,Krachi, Nchumuru/Chonke, Buem, Nkonya, Asante, Akyode, Adele, and Ntrubo.

Akposo or Ikposo: is the language of the Akposo people, and it's the indigenous language for all akposo communities in Ghana. It is considered as one of the Ghana–Togo Mountain languages.

Twi (Akan): It encompasses the Fante and Twi dialects, it is also believed to be spoken by a certain portion of the people who are settlers for purposes of farming, trade or resettlement back in the days within the Oti Region.

Ewe: Ewe is spoken by communities along the Volta Lake and also extends into Togo and Benin.

Dagbani: A member of the Oti-Volta language group, Dagbani is spoken in the Oti region.

Dagaare: Belongs to the northern branch of the Western Oti-Volta group of the Gur branch of the Niger-Congo language family.

Konkomba: Spoken by communities in the area of the Oti River, Konkomba is a Gur language with multiple dialects.

Dangme: A Kwa language spoken by the people of Ada, Yilo and Manya Klo, S1, Osudoku, Kpone (Kpomi), Gbugblaa (Prampram) and Nugo.

Kusaal: A member of the Niger-Congolese, Atlantico-Congolese, Voltaic-Congolese, North, Gur, Gur central, North, Oti-Volta, West, Southeast linguistic family.

Nawdm also known as Losso spoken by Nawdba people. Nawdm is a Gur language of Togo and Ghana. It belongs to the Niger-Congo language family

Kotokoli: also known as Tem, is a Gur language belonging to the Niger-Congo family, spoken in Togo, Ghana, Benin, and Burkina Faso.

Kabre: also known as Kabiye which is a Gur (Voltaic) language spoken primarily in Togo, Benin and Ghana.

Hausa: is a Chadic language spoken primarily in the northern parts of Nigeria, Ghana, Cameroon, Benin and Togo.

== Administrative divisions ==
The political administration of the region is through the local government system. Under this administration system, the region is divided into Nine (9) Municipal and District Assemblies (M/DAs) (made up of 4 Municipalities and 5 District Assemblies). Each Municipal and District Assembly, is administered by a Chief Executive, representing the central government but deriving authority from an Assembly headed by a presiding member elected from among the members themselves. The current list is as follows:

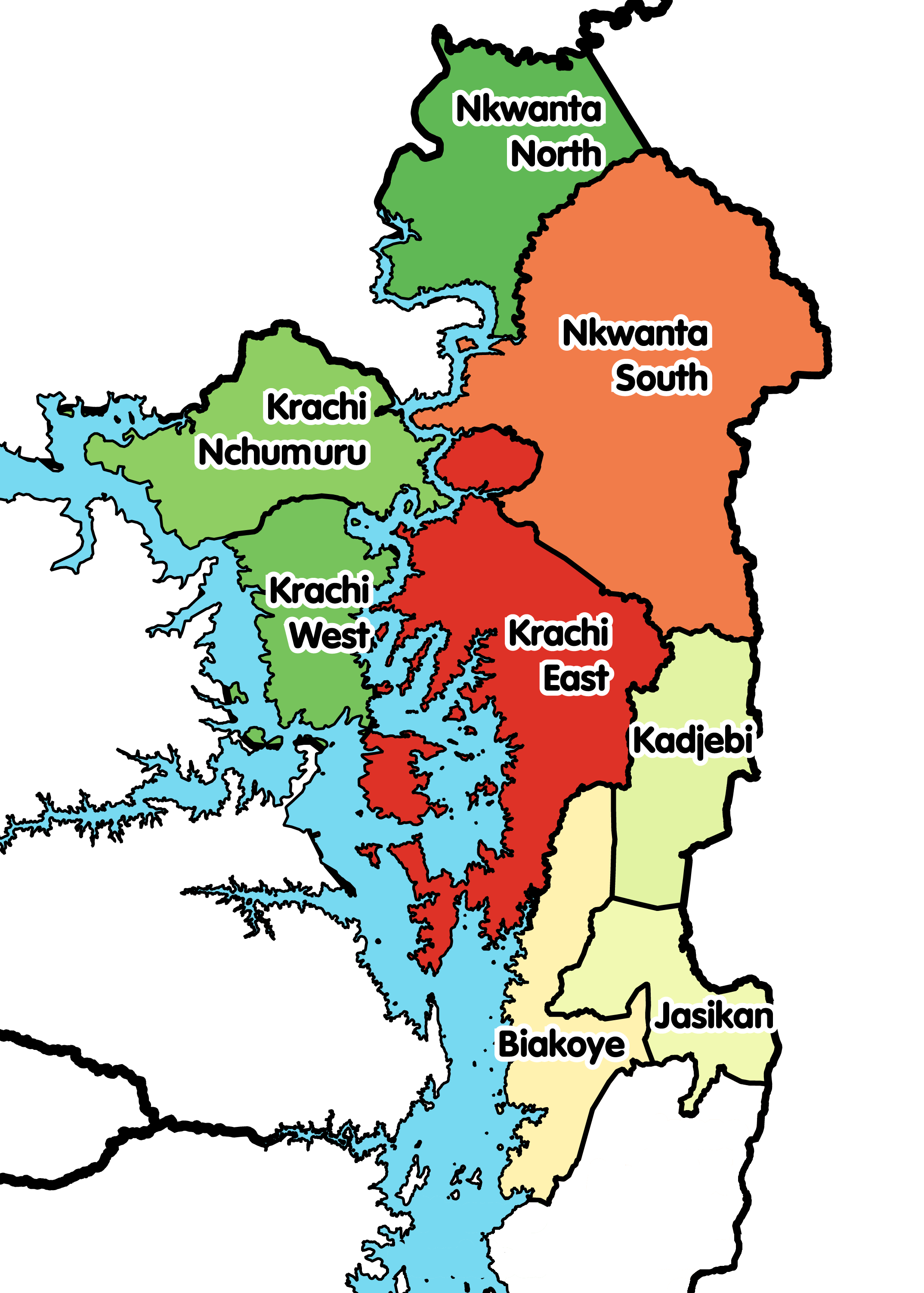

Districts of the Oti Region
#	MMDA Name	Capital	MMDA Type	Chief Executive
1	Biakoye	Nkonya Ahenkro	District	Hon. Eric Kwaku Opong
2	Jasikan	Jasikan	Municipal	Hon.
3	Kadjebi	Kadjebi	District	Hon. Dr. Sam Suraj Issaka
4	Krachi East	Dambai	Municipal	Hon. Sarfo Nketiah
5	Krachi Nchumuru	Chinderi	District	Hon. Martin Kofi Anato
6	Krachi West	Kete Krachi	Municipal	Hon. Prosper Addo
7	Nkwanta North	Kpassa	District	Hon. Isaiah Dordoe
8	Nkwanta South	Nkwanta	Municipal	Hon. Joseph Antwi
9	Guan	Likpe-Mate	District	Hon. Godfred Kofi

== Geography and climate ==
=== Location and size ===
The Oti Region is bordered on the north by the Northern region, to the south by the Volta Region, and to the west by the Volta Lake. It has 9 districts.

=== Climate and vegetation ===
The Oti Region is much drier than the rest of the southern areas of Ghana, due to its proximity to the north. The vegetation consist of mostly of grassland, especially savanna with clusters of drought-resistant trees such as baobabs or acacias. Between December and April is the dry season. The wet season is between about May and November with an average annual rainfall of 750 to 1050 mm (30 to 40 inches). The highest temperatures are reached at the end of the dry season, the lowest in December and January. However, the hot Harmattan wind from the Sahara blows frequently between December and the beginning of February. The temperatures can vary between 14 °C (59 °F) at night and 40 °C (104 °F) during the day.

=== Natural resource potential ===
The Ghana Geological Survey Authority has discovered large quantities of Iron ore deposits in Akokrowa, a farming community in the Oti Region of Ghana. The iron ore, according to the geological investigation, is 55.22 weight percent (Fe) and of a higher grade. It is anticipated that the exploration and the business of the Iron will create jobs and wealth for the people of Oti and the country in general.

== Tourism and parks ==
- Kyabobo National Park: The reserve is situated in Nkwanta, in the Nkwanta South District of the area, between the Savannah and tropical rain forest. The reserve was established in 1993 with the intention of safeguarding wildlife and other endangered animal species while also giving them a comfortable place to live away from danger and human activity. The boundaries of the park have, however, been altered numerous times since then.
- Lake Volta
- Breast Mountain, Chilinga
- Chaiso Forest Reserve
- Hanging Village, Shiare
