= Agotime-Ziope =

Constituency in Ghana

- constituency for the Parliament of Ghana
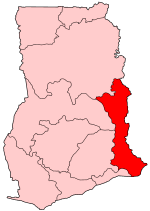
- District: Agotime Ziope District
- Region: Volta Region of Ghana

Current constituency
- Created: 2012
- Party: National Democratic Congress
- MP: Charles Agbeve

Agotime-Ziope is one of the constituencies represented in the Parliament of Ghana. It elects one Member of Parliament (MP) by the first past the post system of election. Agotime-Ziope is located in the newly created Agotime Ziope district of the Volta Region of Ghana. It was created in 2012 by the Electoral Commission of Ghana prior to the Ghanaian general election.

== Members of Parliament ==
Ho East
First elected	Member	Party
1954	Rev. Francis Richard Ametowobla	Independent
1960	Emmanuel Yaw Attigah	Convention People's Party
Ho (Merger of Ho East and Ho West)
1965	Emmanuel Yaw Attigah	Convention People's Party
Ho East
1969	Komla Dotse Akude	National Alliance of Liberals
1979	Togbe Zokah III	People's National Party
1992	Steve Senu Akorli	National Democratic Congress
2004	Juliana Jocelyn Azumah-Mensah	National Democratic Congress
Agotime-Ziope (New constituency created)
2012	Juliana Azumah-Mensah	National Democratic Congress
2016	Charles Agbeve	National Democratic Congress

The first ever election was held in December 2012 as part of the Ghanaian elections. The National Democratic Congress candidate won the seat with a 12,550 majority. This new constituency was partly carved out of the former Ho East so the first elected Member of Parliament was the sitting MP for Ho East. The National Democratic Party has held this seat since the creation of this constituency although there has been a change of MP.

== Elections ==
2024 Ghanaian general election: Agotime-Ziope
Party	Candidate	Votes	%	±%
NDC	Charles Akwesi Agbeve	16,500	85.29	−2.51
NPP	Kentle Seth Agbobli	2,608	13.48	+1.28
NDP	John Tepe	237	1.23	—
Majority		13,892	71.81	−3.79
Turnout		19,622		
Registered electors				

2020 Ghanaian general election
Party	Candidate	Votes	%	±%
NDC	Charles Agbeve	19,143	87.80	+18.18
NPP	John Kwaku Amenya	2,659	12.20	+9.14
Majority		16,484	75.6	+25.34
Turnout		21,802		
Registered electors		28,950		

2016 Ghanaian general election: Agotime Ziope
Party	Candidate	Votes	%	±%
NDC	Charles Agbeve	11,614	69.62	−9.18
Independent	Amenya Wisdom Elvis Ativoe	3,229	19.36	—
NDP	David Yaoga Sunu	1,329	7.97	−2.56
NPP	John Kwaku	510	3.06	+1.75
Majority		8,385	50.26	−18.09
Turnout		16,682		—

2012 Ghanaian parliamentary election: Agotime Ziope
Party	Candidate	Votes	%	±%
NDC	Juliana Azumah-Mensah	14,485	78.88	—
NDP	David Yaoga Sunu	1,935	10.53	—
NPP	David Dickson Dzorkpe	1,721	9.36	—
CPP	Sakpa Yao Kuma Donkor	241	1.31	—
Majority		12,550	68.35	—
Turnout		—	—	—

== See also ==
- List of Ghana Parliament constituencies
- Ho East
