= Akua Sena Dansua =

Ghanaian politician

HE. Akua Sena Dansua
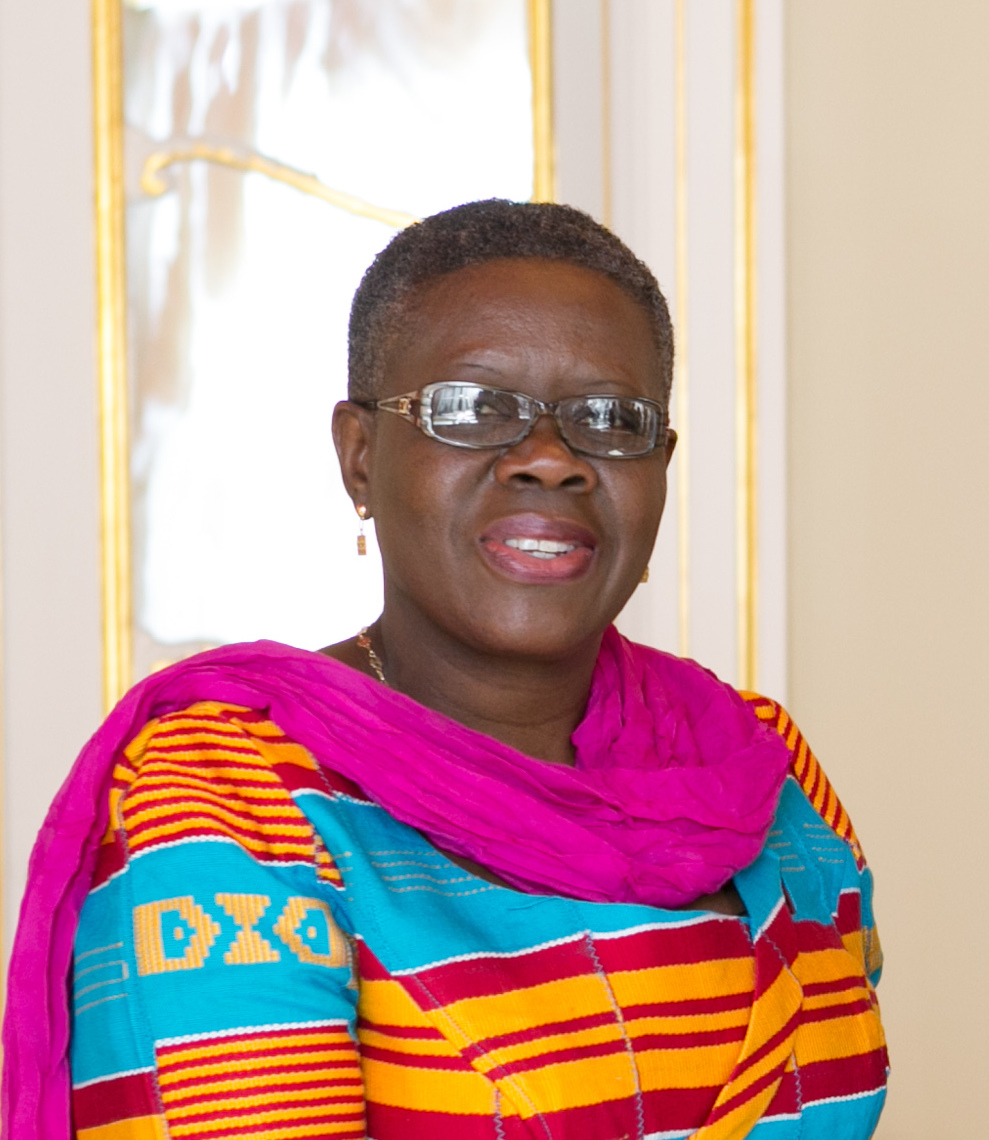

Member of the Ghana Parliament for North Dayi
- In office 7 January 2001 – 7 January 2013
- Preceded by: Stephen George Obimpeh
- Succeeded by: George Loh
- Majority: 27,108

Minister for Tourism
- In office January 2011 – January 2013
- President: John Atta Mills
- Preceded by: Zita Okaikoi

Minister for Youth and Sports
- In office January 2010 – January 2011
- President: John Atta Mills
- Preceded by: Abdul-Rashid Pelpuo
- Succeeded by: Clement Kofi Humado

Minister for Women and Children's Affairs
- In office February 2009 – January 2010
- President: John Atta Mills
- Preceded by: Hajia Alima Mahama
- Succeeded by: Juliana Azumah-Mensah

Personal details
- Born: 23 April 1958 (age 68) Hohoe, Ghana
- Party: National Democratic Congress
- Spouse: divorced
- Children: 3
- Education: Mawuli School
- Alma mater: University of Ghana, Legon; Ghana Institute of Management and Public Administration
- Occupation: Politician, Media and Communications Consultant, Gender Activist, Governance and Leadership Practitioner and Consultant
- Profession: Journalist

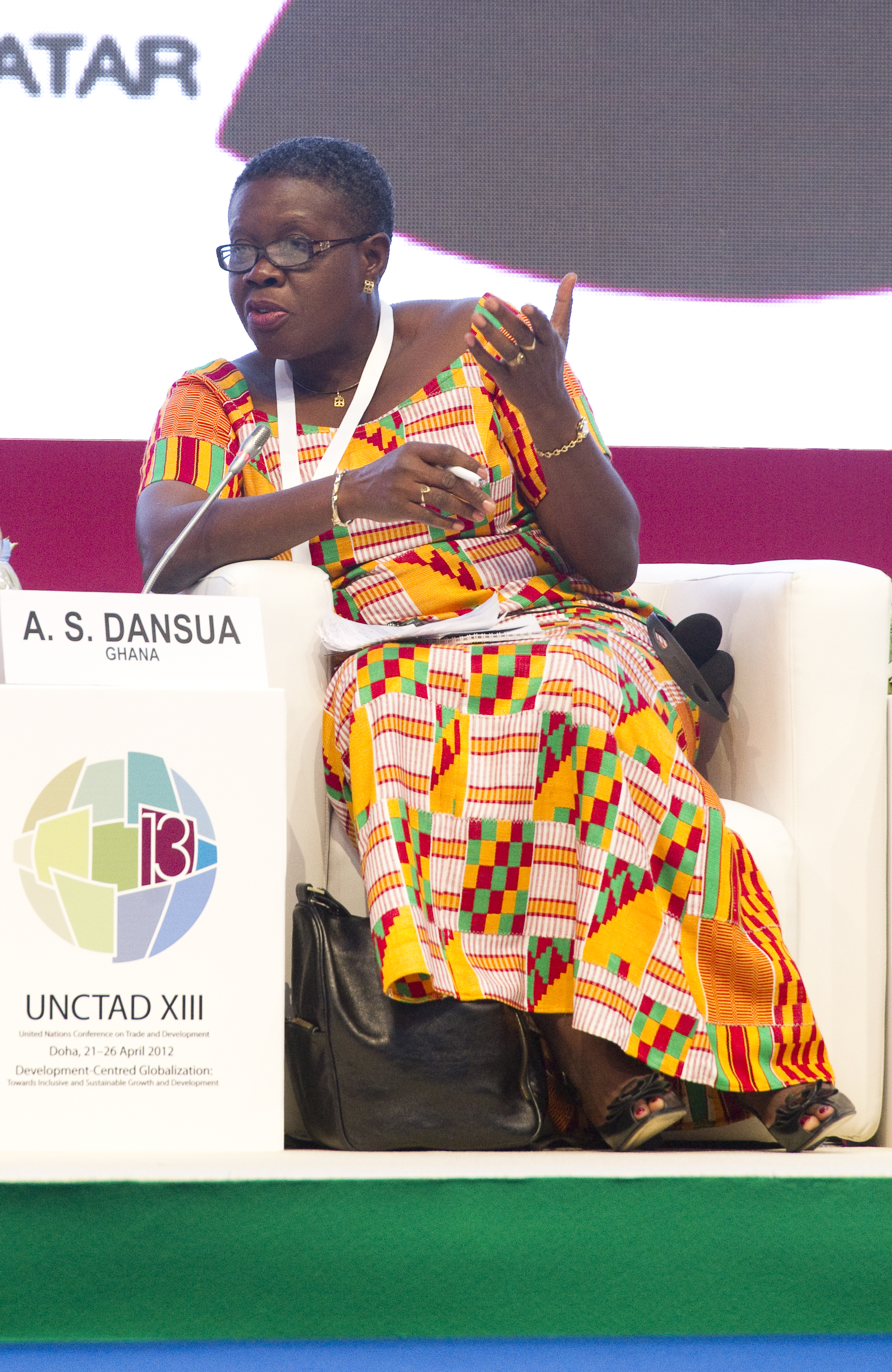
Sena Dansua speaking at a Women in Development session on Equality of opportunity versus equality of outcome on 23 April 2012 in Doha

Akua Sena Dansua (born 23 April 1958) is an experienced Ghanaian media and communications consultant, politician and governance and leadership practitioner. She was the Member of Parliament for North Dayi in Ghana and former ambassador to Germany.

== Early life and education ==
Dansua was born at Hohoe in the Hohoe Municipal District of the Volta Region on 23 April 1958. Her family hails from Botoku, also in the Volta Region. She started her primary education at the Kadjebi-Akan Local Authority Experimental Primary and Middle School. She then went on to have her secondary education at the Mawuli School at Ho, the capital of the Volta Region.

She trained as a journalist at the Ghana Institute of Journalism in Accra. Dansua was a postgraduate student of Communication Studies at the University of Ghana at Legon, completing in 1990. She also acquired a master's degree in Governance and Leadership from the Ghana Institute of Management and Public Administration.

== Career ==
Akua Dansua was Electoral Assistant at the Electoral Commission of Ghana between 1979 and 1980. From 1983 to 1987 she was the chief reporter of the Nigerian Reporter newspaper.

She worked with the Weekly Spectator newspaper in Accra, Ghana, as a journalist, eventually becoming the Features Editor of the paper.

She held this position until she moved into politics. She has also served as Technical Advisor to the National Council on Women and Development and as a Media Consultant to the United Nations Development Programme (UNDP).

She is the chairperson for Advocates for Gender and Development Initiatives-Ghana, which is an NGO at Kpando and a board member for Africa in Democracy and Good Governance (ADG) in The Gambia.

== Politics ==
Dansua is a member of the National Democratic Congress (NDC). She was appointed District Chief Executive for Kpando under the Provisional National Defence Council government of Jerry Rawlings. She first entered parliament in 2001 as the MP for the North Dayi constituency. She later rose to become Minister of Women and children's Affairs, Youth and Sports and later Tourism. She attributed her success to clamping down Visa racketeering processes during her tenure as Minister for Youth and sports.

=== Member of Parliament ===
Dansua served as member of parliament in 3rd, 4th and 5th parliaments of the 4th Republic of Ghana from January 2001 to January 2013. In her role as a parliamentarian, she also undertook special assignments as a member of the Commonwealth Observer Team to The Gambia Presidential election in 2006 and also as a member of Ghana's Parliamentary delegation to the 37th African conference of the Commonwealth Parliamentary Association, Abuja, Nigeria.

==== 2000 Elections ====
Dansua was elected as the member of parliament for the North Dayi constituency in the 2000 Ghanaian general elections. He won the elections on the ticket of the National Democratic Congress.

Her constituency was a part of the 17 parliamentary seats out of 19 seats won by the National Democratic Congress in that election for the Volta Region. The National Democratic Congress won a minority total of 92 parliamentary seats out of 200 seats in the 3rd parliament of the 4th republic of Ghana.

She was elected with 23,962 votes out of 32,785 total valid votes cast. This was equivalent to 73.8% of the total valid votes cast. She was elected over Thomas A.K.M. Ntumy of the Convention People's Party, Seth A. Akwensivie of the New Patriotic Party, Adolf Agbpdza of the United Ghana Movement and Augustine Yawo Adjei of the National Reformed Party.

These obtained 6,175, 1,161, 805 and 352 votes respectively out of the total valid votes cast. These were equivalent to 19%, 3.6%, 2.5 and 1.1% respectively of total valid votes cast.

=== Minister of state ===
She first became a minister of state in 2009 when she was appointed Minister for Women and Children's Affairs by President John Evans Atta Mills. She worked in that role for almost one year from February 2009 to January 2010.

She later became the first female minister for youth and sports after a cabinet reshuffle in January 2010 and Minister for Tourism on 4 January 2011. In January 2011, after serving for a year as Minister of Youth and Sports, she was appointed Minister for Tourism, replacing Zita Okaikoi.

=== Ambassador ===
Dansua was appointed by President John Dramani Mahama to serve as Ambassador of Ghana to Germany in May 2014. She worked in that role promoting the Ghanaian Tourism sector, seeking the welfare of Ghanaians in Germany and fostering a good relationship with the German government until January 2017. She was also the ambassador of Ghana to Latvia. She assumed her role as a non-resident Ambassador of the Republic of Ghana to Latvia whilst still working as Ambassador to Germany on 10 March 2015.

=== Judicial Council ===
Ms. Dansua is a member of the Judicial Council appointed in February 2025

=== Local Government Service Council ===
She was appointed the chairperson of the Local Government Service Council on 15 July 2025.

== Professional associations and boards ==
Dansua is a member of several civic, social and non-governmental agencies and organizations. She is a member of the African Women Development Fund (AWDF) and was the chairperson of the West Africa Media Network (WAMNET). Dansua also served as vice-president of the Association of Women in the Media (ASWIM) Ghana. Whilst working as a journalist she also served as an executive member of the Parliamentary Press Corps.

Dansua served as a member of the Evangelical Presbyterian (EP) University College Council in 2005.

She has joined UNITE Parliamentarian network which is a network headed by Ricardo Leite to further causes on global health.

== Awards and recognition ==
Dansua was recognised by the Women's Law and Human Rights Institute of the Art Foundation for her leadership role in the development of women and her role as women's activist in Ghana. Whilst Danusa was a full-time journalist she received a number of fellowship and scholarship awards, most notable amongst them was when she received the Dag Hammarskjold fellowship in 1991, awarded by the United Nations Correspondents Association for being the most promising journalist from Africa. She was given a rare opportunity to attend the 46th UN General Assembly session in New York in 1991 as her prize.

== Personal life ==
Dansua is divorced with three children. She is a Christian and worships as an Evangelical Presbyterian. During her leisure time she enjoys doing social work, listening to music, reading and having open discussions and browsing the internet.

== See also ==
- North Dayi
- Ministry of Women and Children's Affairs
- Ministry of Youth and Sports (Ghana)

Parliament of Ghana
Preceded by Stephen Obimpeh	Member of Parliament for North Dayi; 2001–13	Succeeded by George Loh
Political offices
Preceded by Hajia Alima Mahama	Minister for Women and Children's Affairs; 2009–10	Succeeded by Juliana Azumah-Mensah
Preceded by Abdul-Rashid Pelpuo	Minister for Youth and Sports; 2010–11	Succeeded by Clement Kofi Humado
Preceded by Zita Okaikoi	Minister for Tourism; 2011–2013	Succeeded by Elizabeth Ofosu-Agyare
