= Modestus Yao Z. Ahiable =

Ghanaian politician

H.E Modestus Yao Zebu Ahiable

Ambassador of Ghana to Benin
- In office October 2009 – January 2013

Member of Parliament for Ketu North Constituency
- In office 7 January 1993 – 6 January 2005
- Succeeded by: James Klutse Avedzi

Personal details
- Born: 10 October 1948 Dzodze, Gold Coast
- Died: 21 January 2024 (aged 75) Dzodze, Ghana
- Resting place: Dzodze, Ghana
- Party: National Democratic Congress
- Spouse: Celestine Afi Atiamon Ahiable
- Education: St. Francis Teacher Training College
- Occupation: Politician
- Profession: Teacher

Modestus Yawo Zebu Ahiable (10 October 1948- 21 January 2024) was a Ghanaian politician and a member of parliament for Ketu North of the Volta Region Of Ghana. He also served as Ghana's Ambassador to Benin from 2009 to 2013. He served as Volta Regional Minister from 1993 to 1997 during the Jerry Rawlings government.

== Early life and education ==
Ahiable was born on 10 October 1948 in the Volta Region of Ghana. He attended St Francis Teacher Training College where he practised as a teacher trainee.

== Politics ==
A Teacher by profession, He began his political career as member of the National Democratic Congress. He was elected into the first parliament of the fourth republic of Ghana on 7 January 1993 after he was pronounced winner at the 1992 Ghanaian parliamentary election held on 29 December 1992.

He was then re-elected as a member of parliament for Ketu North Constituency in the 2nd and 3rd parliament of the 4th republic of Ghana. During the 1996 Ghanaian General Elections, He polled 35,308 votes out of the 38,390 valid votes cast representing 74.30% over Samuel Kofi A. Dzamesi of the New Patriotic Party who polled 3,082 votes representing 6.50%.

He won his seat with a total of 16,252 votes making 57% of the total votes cast that year. His constituency was a part of the 19 constituencies won by the National Democratic Congress in the Volta region in that elections. In 1993, He was appointed by Jerry John Rawlings to serve as the Volta Regional Minister, serving from 1993 to 1997 during the Jerry Rawlings government.

=== Diplomatic career ===
In 2009, John Evans Atta Mills appointed him as Ghana's Ambassador to Benin. He served in that role from 2009 to 2013.

=== 2000 elections ===
Ahiable was elected as the member of parliament for the Ketu North constituency in the 2000 Ghanaian general elections. He won the elections on the ticket of the National Democratic Congress.

His constituency was a part of the 17 parliamentary seats out of 19 seats won by the National Democratic Congress in that election for the Volta Region.The National Democratic Congress won a minority total of 92 parliamentary seats out of 200 seats in the 3rd parliament of the 4th republic of Ghana.

He was elected with 16,252 votes out of 29,698 total valid votes cast. This was equivalent to 57% of the total valid votes cast.

He was elected over Conor C. K. Dzakpasua an independent candidate, Akagla Prosper an independent candidate, Albert Korbla Avinu of the New Patriotic Party, Oscar S.Y. Dzramedo of the Convention People's Party, J.K. Wotordzor of the National Reformed Party, Kpemli K.K Christian of the People's National Convention and Kponyoh C. Kwasi of the United Ghana Movement.

These obtained 5,696, 2,159, 1,802, 1,557, 716, 184 and 134 votes respectively out of the total valid votes cast. These were equivalent to 20%, 7.6%, 6.3%, 5.5%, 2.5%, 0.6% and 0.5% respectively of total valid votes cast.

== Personal life and Death ==
Ahiable was a Godian.

Ahiable died in 21 January 2024, aged 75.
