= Peter Nortsu-Kotoe =

Ghanaian politician

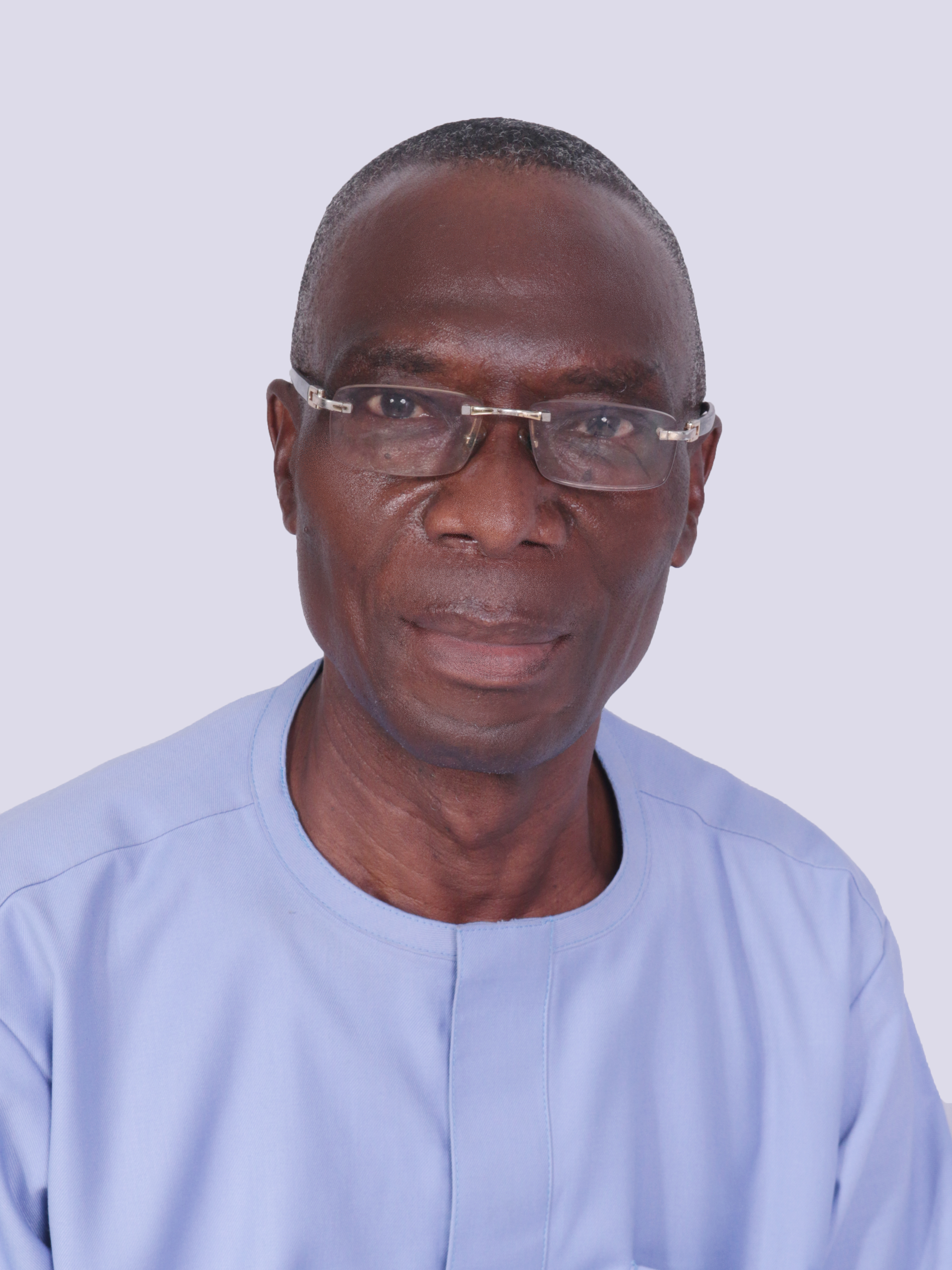

Member of the Ghana Parliament for Akatsi North
- Incumbent
- Assumed office 7 January 2013
- Preceded by: New Constituency
- Majority: 5,195

Personal details
- Born: Peter Kwasi Nortsu-Kotoe; 6 May 1956 (age 70)
- Party: National Democratic Congress

Peter Kwasi Nortsu-Kotoe (born 6 May 1956) is a Ghanaian politician and member of the Eighth Parliament of the Fourth Republic of Ghana representing the Akatsi North Constituency in the Volta Region on the ticket of the National Democratic Congress.

== Early life ==
Nortsu-Kotoe was born on 6 May 1956. He hails from Kpeduhoe in the Volta Region of Ghana.

== Education ==
Nortsu-Kotoe is a graduate of the University of Ghana with a bachelor of degree in English. He holds a master of development management from the Ghana Institute of Management and Public Administration.

== Career ==
Nortsu-Kotoe is an educationist by profession. He was a tutor at Accra Academy and an assistant director of the Ghana Education Service by rank.

== Employment ==
- Ghana Education Service (tutor, Accra Academy, Bubiashie-Accra / Assistant Director)
- District Chief Executive (Akatsi District / Akatsi South District), April, 2009 – January 6, 2013
- MP (January 7, 2013 – present; 4th term)

== Politics ==
Nortsu-Kotoe was the District Chief Executive of the Akatsi District and the Akatsi South District from April 2009 until entering parliament on 7 January 2013. He was elected to represent the Akatsi North Constituency on the ticket of the National Democratic Congress during the 2012 Ghanaian general election. In 2016, he was elected again to represent the constituency for the next four years in parliament. He retained his seat in the 2020 and 2024 elections.

== 2020 Elections ==
In the 2020 elections, Nortsu-Kotoe won the Akatsi North Constituency seat by garnering 9,770 votes, representing 68.11%, of the total votes cast in the constituency.

== 2024 Elections ==
Nortsu-Kotoe retained the Akatsi North Constituency seat in the 2024 elections. He won with 10,837 votes, representing 73.9%.

== Personal life ==
Nortsu-Kotoe is married with three children. He identifies as a Christian and a member of the Evangelical Presbyterian Church, Ghana.

Parliament of Ghana
New title	Member of Parliament for Agotime-Ziope; 2013–present	Incumbent
