= Ketu North (Ghana parliament constituency) =

Constituency in Ghana

- constituency for the Parliament of Ghana
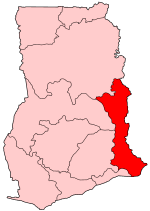
- District: Ketu District
- Region: Volta Region of Ghana

Current constituency
- Party: National Democratic Congress
- MP: Eric Edem Agbana

Ketu North is one of the constituencies represented in the Parliament of Ghana. It elects one Member of Parliament (MP) by the first past the post system of election. Ketu North is located in the Ketu district of the Volta Region of Ghana.

== Boundaries ==
The constituency is located within the Ketu district of the Volta Region of Ghana. Its northern border is shared with the Republic of Togo. Ketu South constituency is located to the south east. To the south west is the Keta District. The north western neighbour of this constituency is the Akatsi District, which shares the same boundaries with the Avenor-Ave constituency.

== Members of Parliament ==
First elected	Member	Party
1992	Modestus Yawo Zebu Ahiable	National Democratic Congress
1996	Modestus Yawo Zebu Ahiable	National Democratic Congress
2004	James Klutse Avedzi	National Democratic Congress
2024	Eric Edem Agbana	National Democratic Congress

== Election results ==
2024 Ghanaian general election: Ketu North
Party	Candidate	Votes	%	±%
NDC	Eric Edem Agbana	41,002	87.01	+33.37
NPP	Enoch Kwabla Amegbletor	5,902	12.52	−33.22
NDP	Hadzah Shelta Ziodofe Kwesi	128	0.27	+0.01
Liberal Party of Ghana	Pascaline Kassah	93	0.20	—
Majority		35,100	74.49	+66.59
Turnout		47,517	—	—
Registered electors		—		

2020 Ghanaian general election: Ketu North
Party	Candidate	Votes	%	±%
NDC	James Klutse Avedzi	28,041	53.64	
NPP	Samuel Kofi Ahiave Dzamesi	23,913	45.74	
APC	Kinnock Kedem Wovenu	192	0.37	—
NDP	Gilbert Kassah	135	0.26	
Majority		4,128	7.9	—
Turnout		—	—	—
Registered electors		63,987		

2016 Ghanaian general election: Ketu North
Party	Candidate	Votes	%	±%
National Democratic Congress	James Klutse Avedzi	25,260	61.45	—
Independent	Samuel Kofi Ahiave Dzamesi	15,596	37.94	—
Progressive People's Party	Gbedjeh Liberty Cynthia	176	0.43	—
Independent	Nyadey Dennis Sedinam	75	0.18	—
Majority				—
Turnout		41,107		—

2012 Ghanaian general election: Ketu North
Party	Candidate	Votes	%	±%
National Democratic Congress	James Klutse Avedzi	33,825	77.01	—
New Patriotic Party	Pius Enam Nadzide	8,153	18.56	—
Progressive People's Party	Atitsogbui Gregory	1,040	2.37	—
Convention People's Party	Amenyo Joseph Kwashie	553	1.26	—
National Democratic Party	Stephen Koame Soglo	211	0.48	—
People's National Convention	Nicholas Agbogli	140	0.32	—
Majority				—
Turnout		43,922		—

2008 Ghanaian general election: Ketu North
Party	Candidate	Votes	%	±%
National Democratic Congress	James Klutse Avedzi	24124	68.1	—
New Patriotic Party	Samuel Kofi Ahiave Dzamesi	10894	30.7	—
People's National Convention	Nicholas Agbogli	316	0.9	—
Democratic People's Party	Daniel Ablorh	101	0.3	—
Convention People's Party	Benedicta Yibor	0	0	—
Majority				—
Turnout				—

2004 Ghanaian parliamentary election: Ketu North
Party	Candidate	Votes	%	±%
National Democratic Congress	James Klutse Avedzi	28,403	73.3	16.3
New Patriotic Party	Samuel Kofi Ahiave Dzamesi	10,369	26.7	20.4
Majority		18,034	46.6	9.6
Turnout		39,689	91.5	—
Registered electors		43,374		

2000 Ghanaian parliamentary election: Ketu North
Party	Candidate	Votes	%	±%
National Democratic Congress	Modestus Yao Z. Ahiable	16,252	57.0	—
Independent	Conor C. K. Dzakpasu	5,696	20.0	—
Independent	Akagla Prosper	2,159	7.6	—
New Patriotic Party	Albert Korbla Avinu	1,802	6.3	—
Convention People's Party	Oscar S. Y. Dzramedo	1,557	5.5	—
National Reform Party	J. K. Wotordzor	716	2.5	—
People's National Convention	Kpemli K. K. Christian	184	0.6	—
United Ghana Movement	Kponyoh C. Kwasi	134	0.5	—
Majority		10,556	37.0	—

1996 Ghanaian general election: Ketu North
Party	Candidate	Votes	%	±%
NDC	Modestus Yao Z. Ahiable	35,308	—	—
NPP	Samuel Kofi Ahiave Dzamesi	3,082	—	—
Majority		32,226	—	—
Turnout		—	—	—
Registered electors		—		

== See also ==
- List of Ghana Parliament constituencies
