= Charles Agbeve =

Ghanaian politician

Hon. Charles Agbeve MP
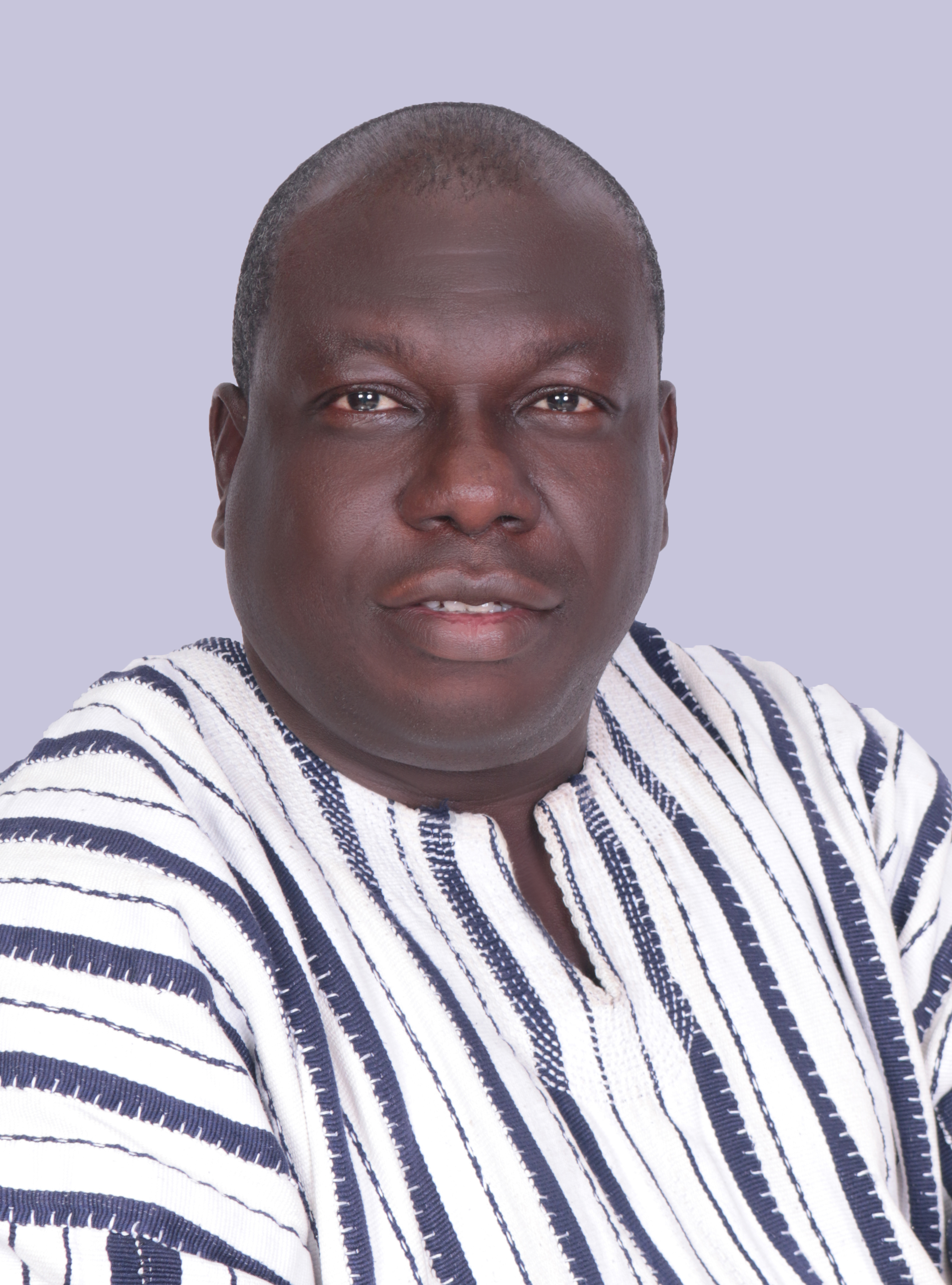

Member of the Ghana Parliament for Agotime-Ziope Constituency
- Incumbent
- Assumed office 7 January 2017
- Preceded by: Juliana Azumah-Mensah
- Majority: 16,484

Personal details
- Born: July 21, 1970 (age 56)
- Party: National Democratic Congress

Charles Akwesi Agbeve (born 21 July 1970) is a Ghanaian politician and member of the Eighth Parliament of the Fourth Republic of Ghana representing the Agotime-Ziope Constituency in the Volta Region on the ticket of the National Democratic Congress.

== Early life and education ==
Charles Agbeve was born in Ziope Honugo in the Volta Region of Ghana. Charles Agbeve passed his Common Entrance Examination in 1982 which enabled him to obtain his Ordinary Level in 1987 and Advanced Level in 1989. He then proceeded to have his Bachelor of Science(Bsc) and Maths Diploma In Education in 1995 from University of Cape Coast. Charles Agbeve continued to have his Master of Business Administration – Finance Option (Health Insurance) in 2002 from University of Ghana, Legon – Ghana. Charles Agbeve also obtained his Master of Arts (Economic Policy Management) from 2017–2018.

== Career ==
Charles Agbeve served as a Maths and Science Teacher at Ghanatta Senior High School. Charles Agbeve has also worked as the Commercial Manager for Ghana Alumnium Products Limited. He also worked as the District /Municipal Manager of National Health Insurance Authority, Ho Municipal Office from 2009 to 2016. Charles Agbeve is now working as the Member of Parliament (MP) for Agotime-Ziope Constituency from 2021 to 2025.

== Political life ==
In 2015, Charles Agbeve contested and won the NDC parliamentary primaries for Agotime-Ziope Constituency in the Volta Region of Ghana. Charles Agbeve also won the parliamentary seat in his constituency during the 2016 Ghanaian general elections on the ticket of the National Democratic Congress to join the Seventh (7th) Parliament of the Fourth Republic of Ghana. He won again with 19143 vote (87.80%) in the 2020 Ghanaian general elections on the ticket of the National Democratic Congress to join the Eighth (8th) Parliament which is the current Parliament now until 2025.

In 2019, he, with other members of Parliament, visited Tepa to tour the abandoned Kumawu Sekeyere District Hospital and the Fomena District Hospital concluding that the government should pay attention to the health center.

=== Committees ===
Charles Agbeve is a member of the Government Assurance Committee and Health Committee of the Eighth (8th) Parliament of the Fourth Republic of Ghana.

== Controversies and lawsuit ==
MP Charles Agbeve urged IGP George Dampare to investigate a suspected case of police brutality that led to the death of a man in his 30s. This comment was made after the family of the late Felix azibodzi says, he was arrested for allegedly being part of a car-snatching incident in Ho, after being lured into an investigative issues.

== Personal life ==
Charles Agbeve is a Christian.

Parliament of Ghana
Preceded by Juliana Azumah-Mensah	Member of Parliament for Agotime-Ziope; 2017–present	Incumbent
