= Ketu South Municipal District =

Municipal District in Volta Region, Ghana

Ketu South Municipal Assembly Ketu Sud
- Municipal District
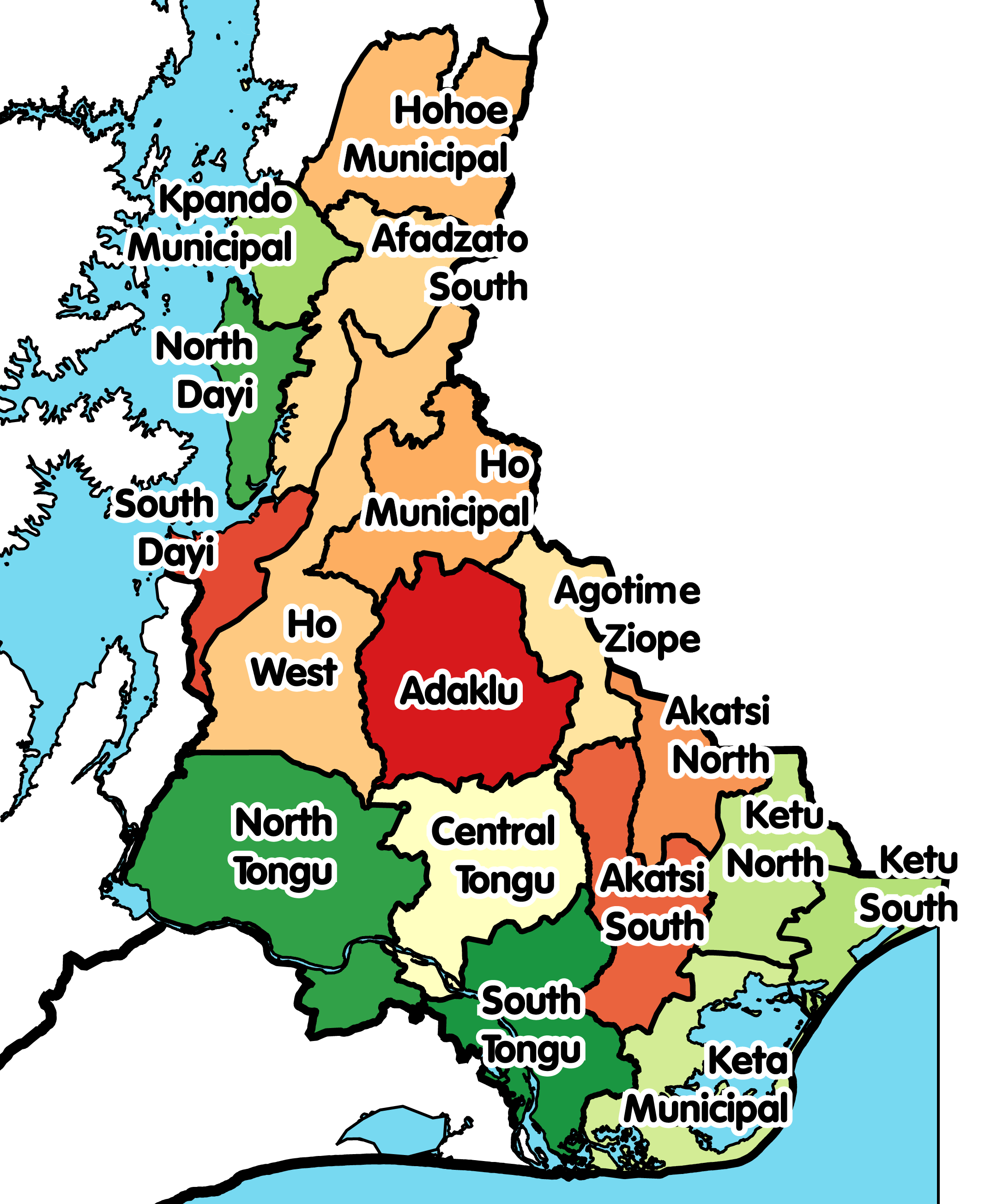
- Districts of Volta Region

- Location of Ketu South Municipal District within Volta
- Coordinates: 6°0′0.36″N 0°35′56.76″E
- Country: Ghana
- Region: Volta
- Capital: Denu

Government
  - Municipal Chief Executive: Hon. Pascal Lamptey

Area
  - Total: 254 km^{2} (98 sq mi)

Population (2021)
  - Total: 253,122
  - Density: 997/km^{2} (2,580/sq mi)
- Time zone: UTC+0 (GMT)
- ISO 3166 code: GH-TV-KS
- Website: www.ketusouth.gov.gh

Ketu South Municipal Assembly formerly Ketu South District, is an administrative unit in the Volta Region, Ghana.

== History ==
Originally it was formerly part of the then-larger Ketu District on 10 March 1989, which was created from the former Anlo District Council, until the northern part of the district was split off to create Ketu North District on 29 February 2008; thus the remaining part has been renamed as Ketu South District. It was later elevated to municipal district assembly status on 28 June 2012 to become Ketu South Municipal District. The municipality is located in the southeast corner of Volta Region, immediately adjacent to the city of Lomé in Togo to the east, and has Denu as its capital town.

== Geography ==
The district is bounded by Togo to the east, the Gulf of Guinea to the south, Keta Municipal District to the west and Ketu North District to the north.

== Settlements ==
The largest settlements in the district are Aflao, Avoeme, Klikor, Pernyi, and Agbozume. Other settlements include Salakope, Adina, Denu, Sonuto, Blekusu, Adafienu, Nogokpoe, Agavedzi, Sarakope and Amutsinu.

== Elections ==
In the 2016 general elections, this constituency has been listed as the topmost one by voter population with over 141,698 registered voters.
