= Tadzewu =

Coordinates: 6°11′N 0°54′E

- Interactive map of Tadzewu
- Country: Ghana
- Region: Volta Region

Tadzewu is a town located in the Ketu North Municipal District of the Volta Region in Ghana, situated between Akatsi and Dzodze.

== Education ==
Education

Tadzewu has a wide range of educational facilities; kindergartens, Primary Schools, Junior High Schools and one-second cycle institution called Wovenu Senior High Technical School.

== Religion ==
The people of Tadzewu are mostly Christians, and the town is popularly known because of a church called; The Apostles Revelation Church.

The town has Muslims and traditionalists.
