= Azumah =

Azumah may refer to:

- Azumah Nelson (born 1958), Ghanaian boxer
- Jerry Azumah (born 1977), American footballer

== See also ==
- Azumah-Mensah
