= Caroline Esinam Adzogble =

Ghanaian educationist

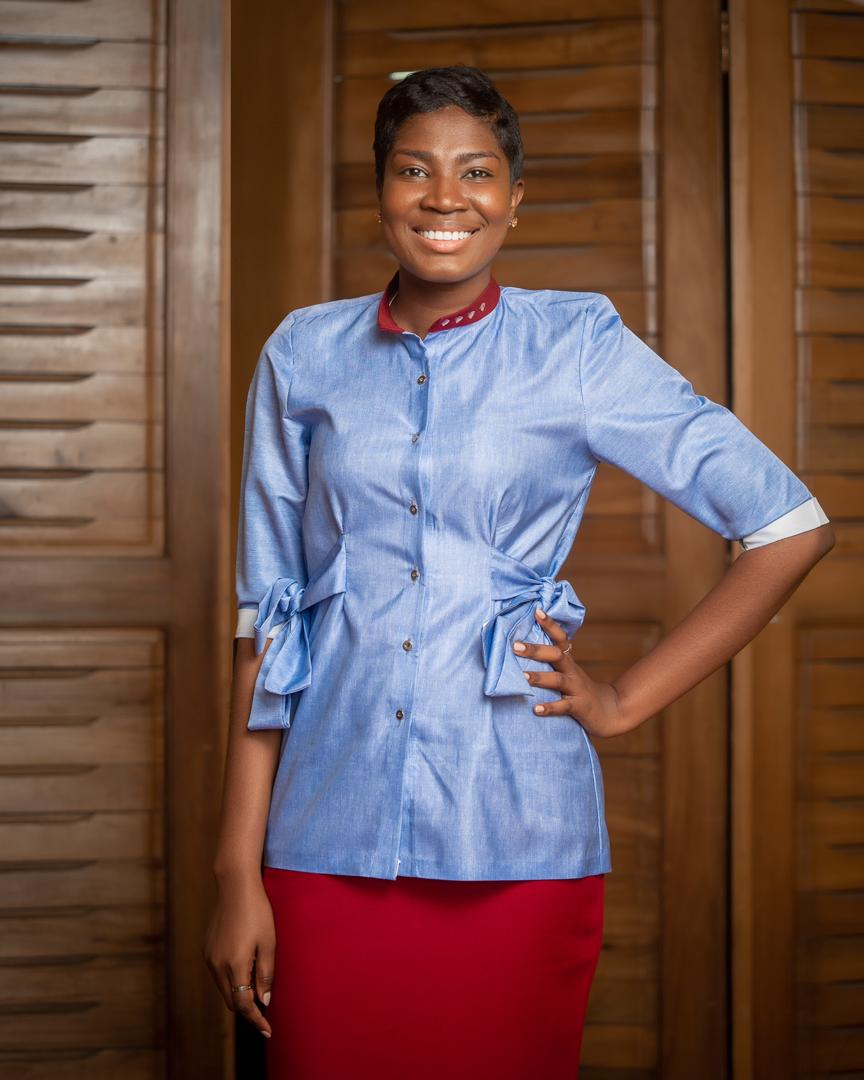
- Born: Caroline Esinam Adzogble; 13 January 1992 (age 34); Tema, Ghana
- Occupation: Education entrepreneur
- Years active: 2010 to present
- Title: Chief executive officer of Caroline Group
- Website: www.carolinegroup.com

Caroline Esinam Adzogble (born 13 January 1992) is a Ghanaian educationist, business coach, gender advocate and education entrepreneur. She is the founder and CEO of Caroline Group, an educational services business from Ghana, West Africa, with expanding business operations in several countries in Africa, Europe and North America. She is the youngest African and Ghanaian woman to own and run an accredited international college.

== Life and education ==
Adzogble was born and raised in Tema, Ghana, and comes from Dzodze in the Volta Region. She studied at Ideal College and proceeded to IPMC College of Technology to study information technology and then completed an online program in Business Studies from the University of Edinburgh.

== Career and entrepreneurial pursuits ==
At the age of 19, Adzogble started her first business, AITC (Ashley Hills IT Center), an IT training school started with a few computers and an office her father gave to her to start with at Tema. After a few years in operation, it rapidly expanded and incorporated other programs under its belt and was re-branded to Potters International College, now an online accredited career training college providing certification programs to students with gaps in their education and academic qualifications. She then co-founded Caroline University, a non-academic training institution delivering entrepreneurial accelerator programs to aspiring young entrepreneurs. She also owns and runs International University Services (IUS), International Boarding School Services (IBSS), Everyday Travels and Tours and Mercy Heart Foundation, a philanthropic organization providing Scholarships and laptops to brilliant but needy students.

== Philanthropy ==
In 2018, she initiated a $1 Million partial and full scholarship scheme for 100 African students through the Caroline Excellence Award Scheme followed by the 100 laptop giveaway project for students and young entrepreneur in 2019 through her Mercy Heart Foundation.

In 2019, Webster University Ghana announced to support the scholarship project with 20 slots for students, making the total number of scholarship slots for 120 African students.

== Recognition ==
On 15 December 2019, she was a recipient of the Millennium Excellence Foundation President's Excellence Youth Prize awarded by His Royal Majesty Otumfuo Nana Osei Tutu II, the Asantehene of the Ashanti Kingdom in recognition of her outstanding contributions to the educational sector.
