= Akatsi North =

Constituency in Ghana

- constituency for the Parliament of Ghana
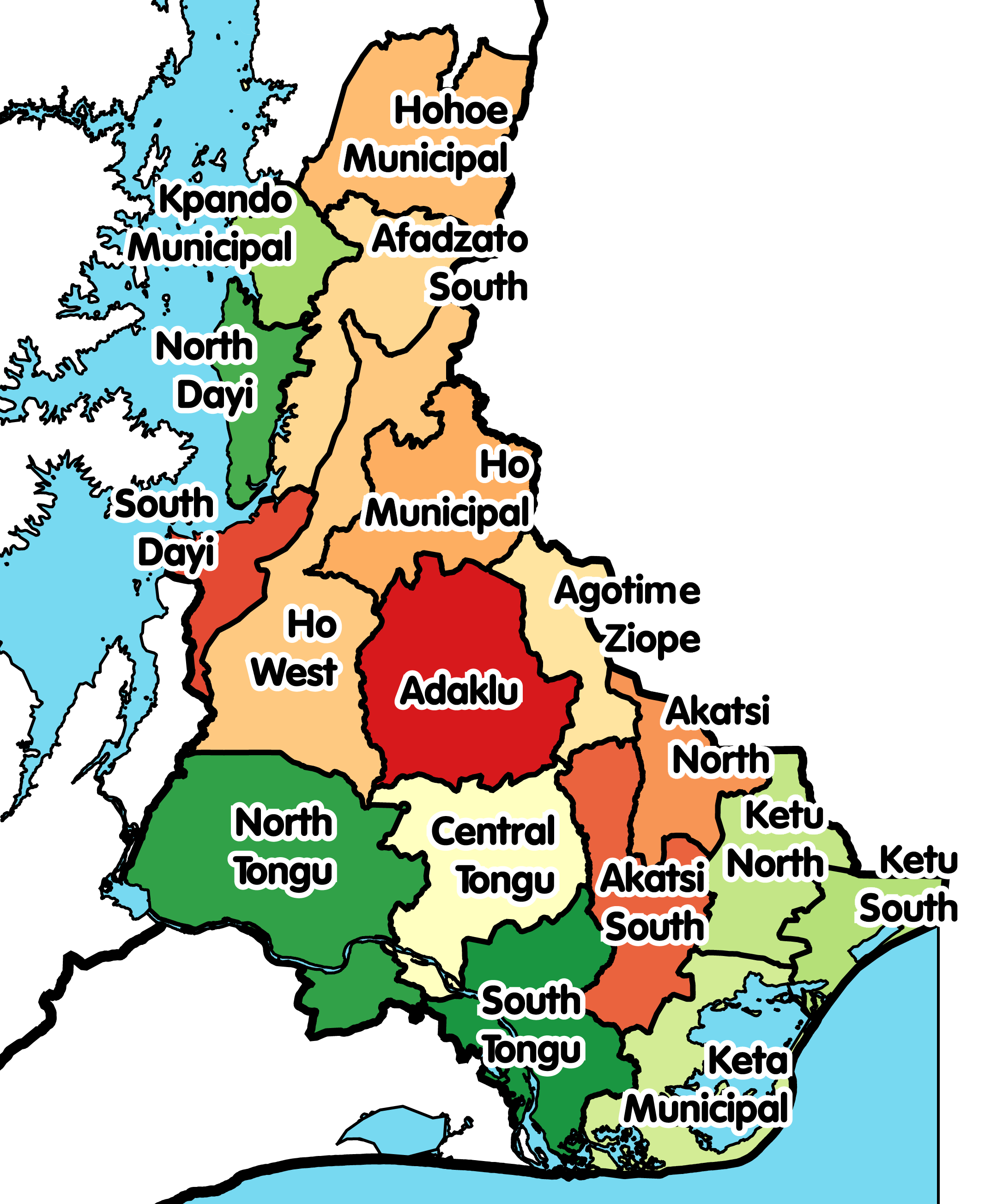
- District: Akatsi North District (shown south-east)
- Region: Volta Region of Ghana

Current constituency
- Created: 2012
- Party: National Democratic Congress
- MP: Peter Nortsu-Kotoe

Akatsi North is one of the constituencies represented in the Parliament of Ghana. It elects one Member of Parliament (MP) by the first past the post system of election. Akatsi North is located in the Akatsi North district of the Volta Region of Ghana. It was created in 2012 by the Electoral Commission of Ghana prior to the Ghanaian general election.

== Members of Parliament ==
First elected	Member	Party
2012	Constituency created	
2012	Peter Nortsu-Kotoe	National Democratic Congress

== Elections ==
The first ever election was held in December 2012 as part of the Ghanaian elections. The National Democratic Congress candidate won the seat with an 8,908 majority.

2024 Ghanaian general election: Akatsi North
Party	Candidate	Votes	%	±%
NDC	Peter Nortsu-Kotoe	10,837	76.93	+8.82
NPP	Simon Peter Kofi Ofosu	3,250	23.07	−8.82
Majority		7,587	53.86	+17.64
Turnout		14,274		
Registered electors				

2020 Ghanaian general election: Akatsi North
Party	Candidate	Votes	%	±%
NDC	Peter Nortsu-Kotoe	9,770	68.11	−21.17
NPP	Simon Peter Kofi Ofosu	4,575	31.89	+21.17
Majority		5,195	36.22	−42.34
Turnout				
Registered electors		17,573		

2016 Ghanaian general election: Akatsi North Source:GhanaWeb
Party	Candidate	Votes	%	±%
NDC	Peter Nortsu-Kotoe	11,482	89.28	+6.29
NPP	Prince Sodoke Amuzu	1,379	10.72	−4.32
Majority		10,103	78.56	+10.61
Turnout				

2012 Ghanaian parliamentary election: Akatsi North Source:Ghana Home Page
Party	Candidate	Votes	%	±%
NDC	Peter Nortsu-Kotoe	10,879	82.99	N/A
NPP	Prince Sodoke Amuzu	1,971	15.04	N/A
CPP	Vincent Kudzo Norgbedzi	259	1.98	N/A
Majority		8,908	67.95	N/A
Turnout		—	—	N/A

== See also ==
- List of Ghana Parliament constituencies
