= Ave-Dzalele =

- Interactive map of Ave-Dzalele
- Location within Ghana
- Coordinates: 6.414163°N 0.755997°E
- Country: Ghana
- Region: Volta Region
- District: Akatsi North District

Population (December 2021)
  - Total: 1,682
- Time zone: UTC±0:00 (GMT)

Ave-Dzalele is a rural town located in the Akatsi North District of the Volta Region in southeastern Ghana. As of December 2021, it has an estimated population of 1,682 people.
