= Joycelyn Tetteh =

Ghanaian politician (born 1988)

Hon. Joycelyn Tetteh MP
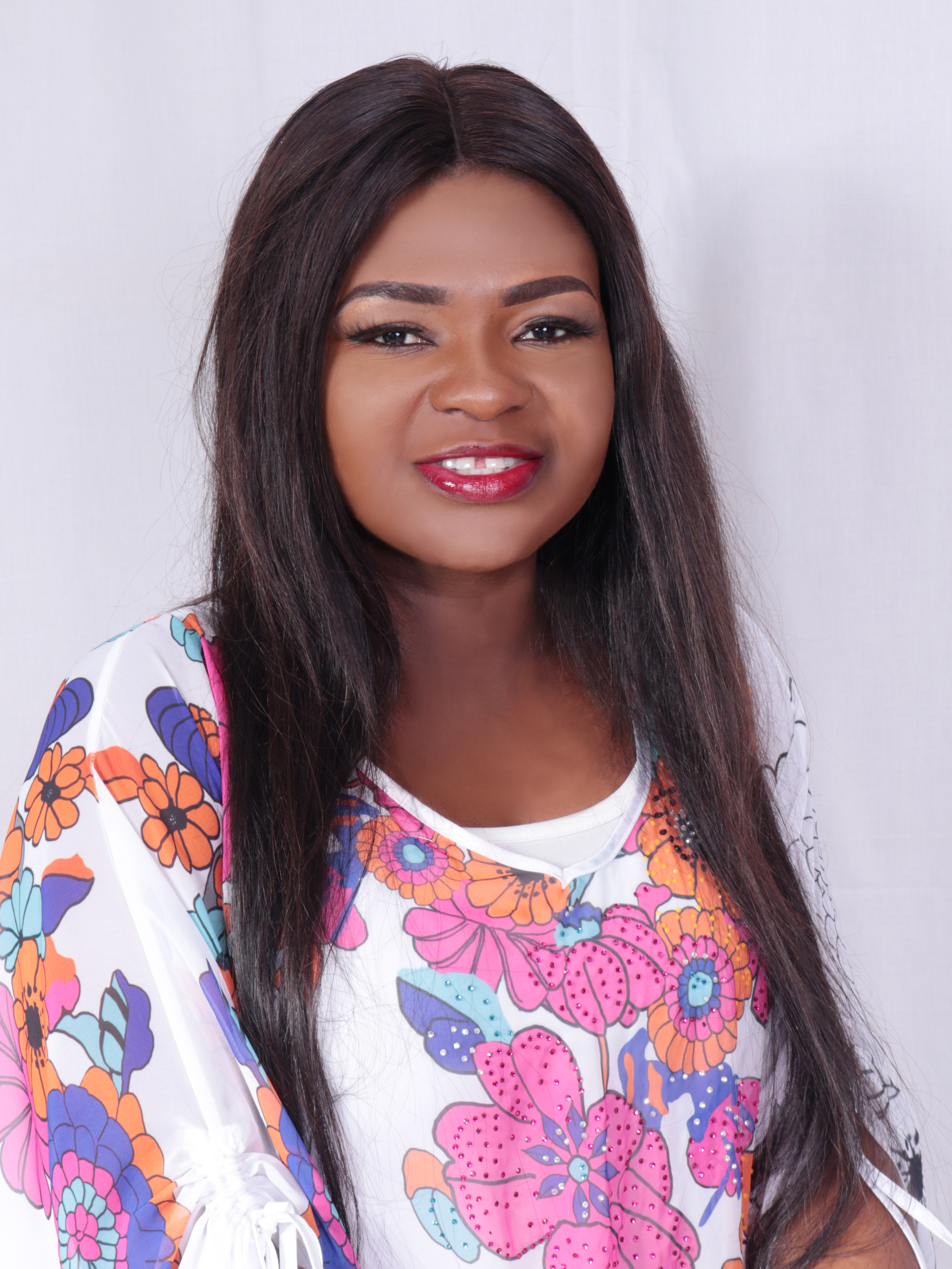

Member of the Ghana Parliament for North Dayi
- Incumbent
- Assumed office 7 January 2017
- President: Nana Akufo-Addo

Personal details
- Born: 10 January 1988 (age 38) Tsyome-Sabadu, Volta Region
- Party: National Democratic Congress
- Education: University of Cape Coast
- Occupation: Politician
- Profession: Administrator

Joycelyn Tetteh (born 10 January 1988) is a Member of Ninth Parliament of the Fourth Republic of Ghana representing the North Dayi in the Volta Region on the ticket of the National Democratic Congress. She was one of the 36 female parliamentarians of the seventh parliament of the fourth republic of Ghana. Tetteh is also currently the ambassador for human trafficking in Ghana. She claimed that government fertilisers meant for farmers were hoarded in the DCE's residence and distributed for vote-buying purposes.

== Early life and education ==
Tetteh was born in Tsyome-Sabadu, Volta Region. She studied Law and BEd in Management Studies at the University of Cape Coast.

== Politics ==
In 2016, she contested and won the NDC parliamentary seat for the North Dayi Constituency in the Volta Region.

=== 2016 election ===
Tetteh first contested the North Day constituency parliamentary seat on the ticket of the National Democratic Congress during the 2016 Ghanaian general election and won the election with 12,948 votes, representing 78.53% of the total votes. She was elected over Wogbe Kpikpitse of the IND, Samuel Kwesi Anomah of the New Patriotic Party, Christopher Wise Siale of the Convention People's Party and Christopher N.A Dotse of the NDP. They obtained 2,946 votes, 457 votes, 66 votes and 57 votes respectively, equivalent to 17.89%, 2.83%, 0.40% and 0.35% of the total votes respectively.

==== 2020 election ====
Tetteh was re-elected as a member of parliament for the North Dayi constituency in the Volta Region on the ticket of National Democratic Congress during the 2020 Ghanaian general election. She was elected with 14,424 votes representing 76.11% of the total votes. She won the election over Kudjoh Edmund Attah of New Patriotic Party who polled 4,455 votes which is equivalent to 23.51% and the parliamentary candidate for the LPG Atteh Kingsely had 72 votes, representing 0.38% of the total votes.

==== 2020 election ====
Tetteh was re-elected as the member of parliament for the North Dayi constituency in the 2024 election, securing 12,778 votes, representing 72.13% of the total valid votes cast, defeating her main opponent, Edmund Attah Kudjoh of the NPP

== Honour ==
She was honoured in August 2019 by the Chiefs and people of the North Dayi Constituency, who conferred on her the title: Mama Edzeame.

== Personal life ==
She is single and a Christian.
