= Akatsi District =

- Former District
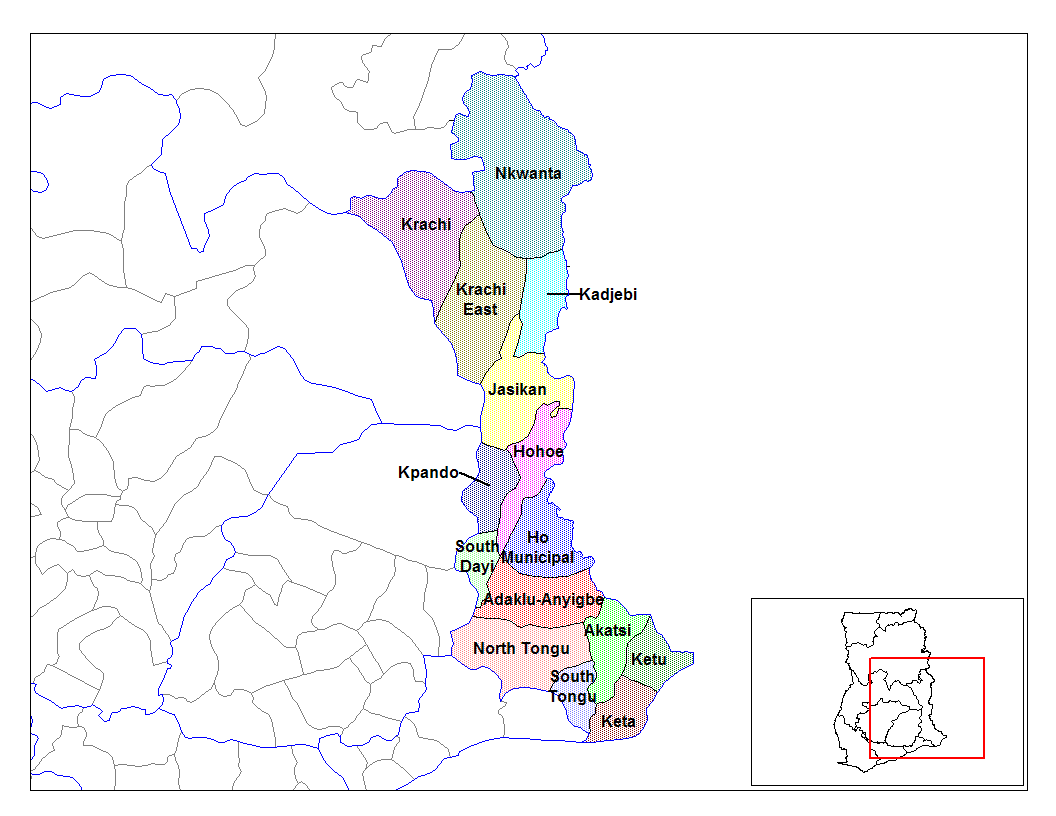
- Districts of Volta Region

- Location of Akatsi District within Volta
- Coordinates: 6°7′51.68″N 0°47′53.56″E
- Country: Ghana
- Region: Volta
- Capital: Akatsi

Area
  - Total: 1,077 km^{2} (416 sq mi)

Population (2021)
  - Total: 92,494
  - Density: 85.88/km^{2} (222.4/sq mi)
- Time zone: UTC+0 (GMT)
- ISO 3166 code: GH-TV-AK

Akatsi District is a former district that was located in Volta Region, Ghana. Originally created as an ordinary district assembly on 10 March 1989, which was created from the former Anlo District Council. However, on 28 June 2012, it was split off into two new districts: Akatsi South District (capital: Akatsi) and Akatsi North District (capital: Ave Dakpa). The district assembly was located in the southeast part of Volta Region and had Akatsi as its capital town.

== Location and geography ==
=== Location ===
Akatsi District was located in the south eastern part of the Volta region. To the south was the Keta Municipal District, to the east, the Ketu District, the North and South Tongu Districts to the west and Ho Municipal District and the Republic of Togo to the north.

== Sources ==
- "Districts of Ghana". Statoids.
- Akatsi District on GhanaDistricts.com
