= Salakope =

Community in Volta Region, Ghana

- Town
- Location of Salakope in Volta Region
- Country: Ghana
- Region: Volta Region
- District: Ketu South District

Population
  - Total: —
- Time zone: GMT
  - Summer (DST): GMT

Salakope is a community in the Ketu South District in the Volta Region of Ghana.
