= Ketu North Municipal District =

Municipal District in Volta Region, Ghana

Ketu North Municipal District Ketu Dzigbe Municipal District Ketu-Nord
- Municipal District
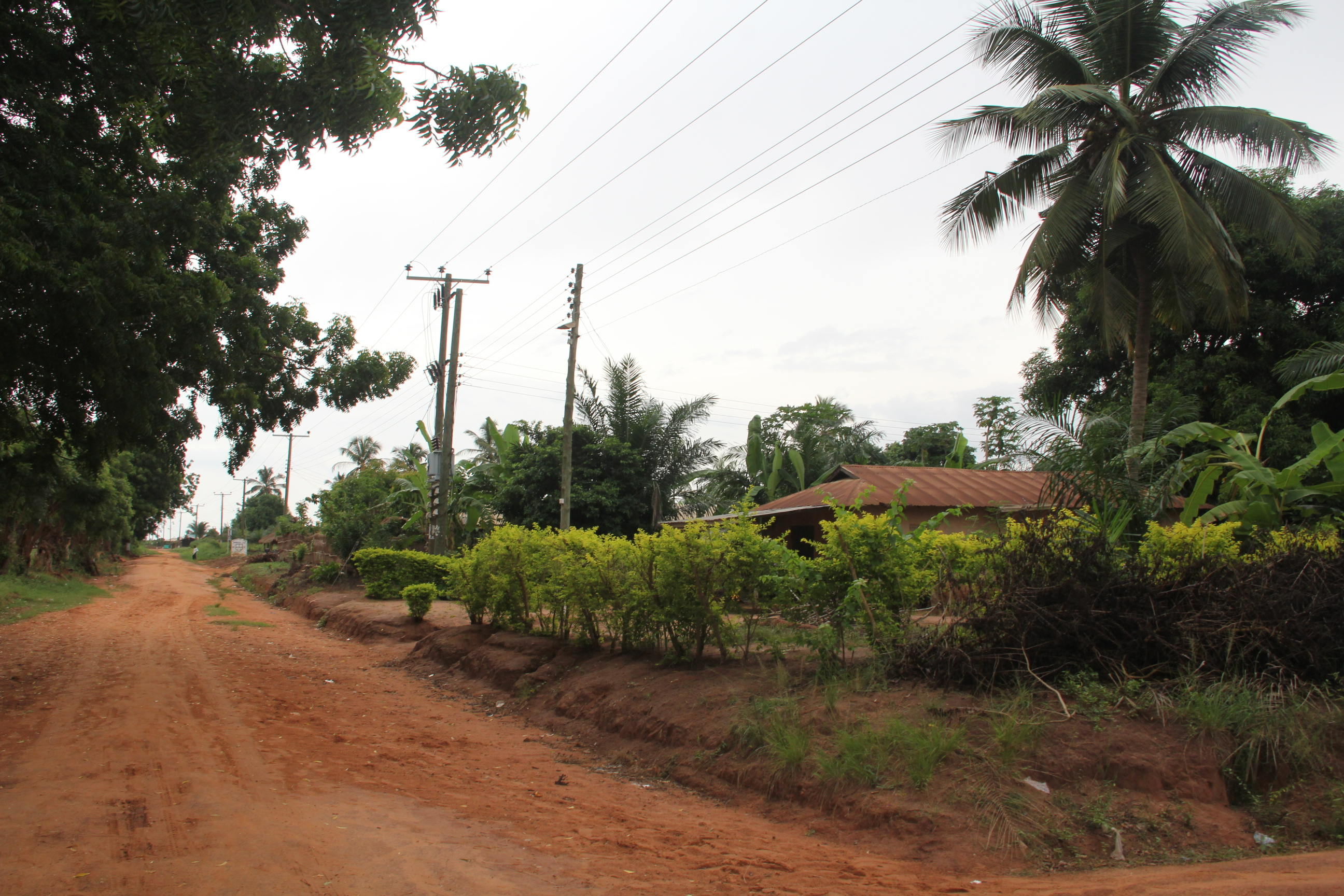
- Major road from Ohawu to Afife through Kporkuve, 2019

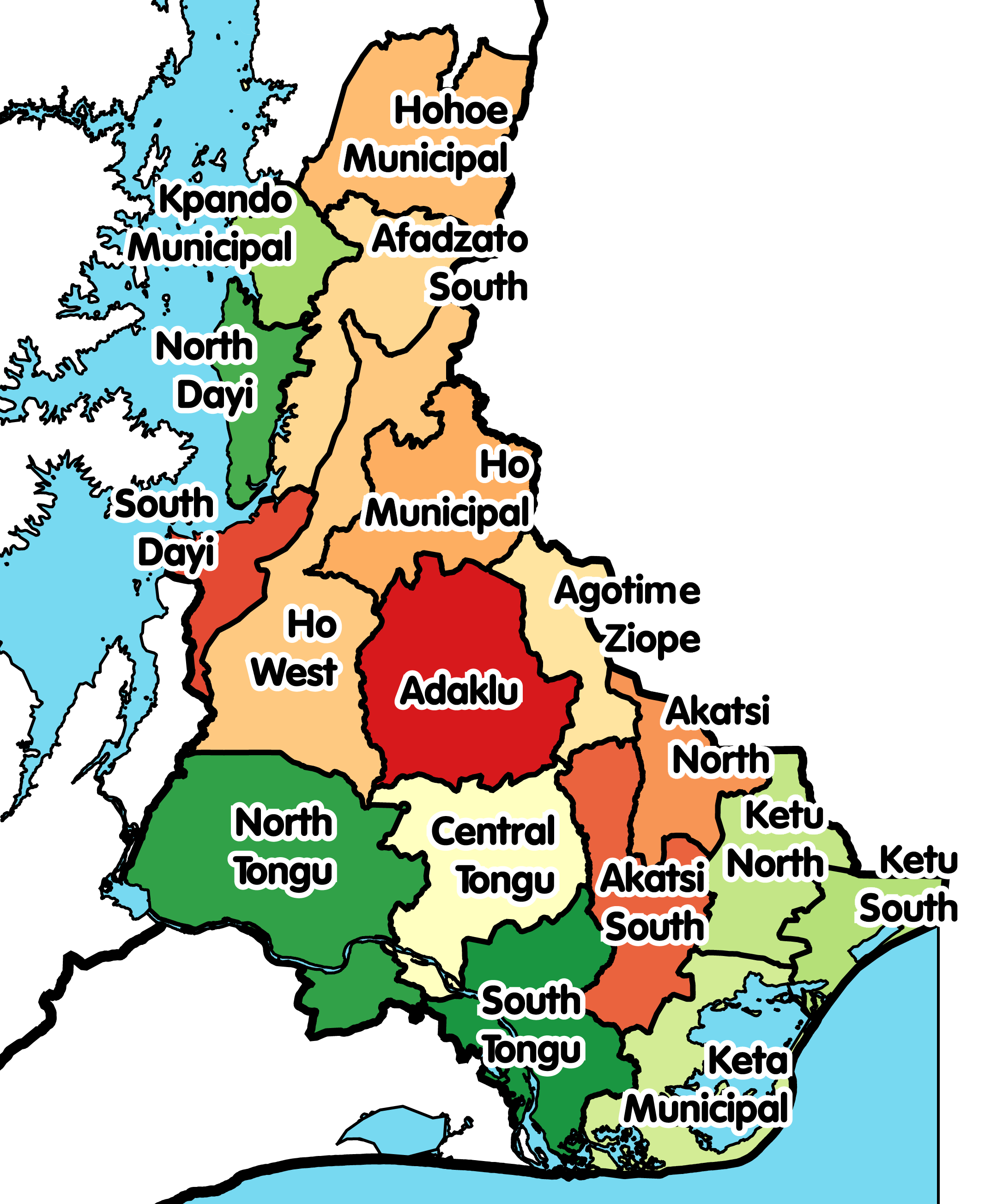
- Districts of Volta Region

- Location of Ketu North Municipal District within Volta
- Coordinates: 6°14′13.27″N 0°59′46.14″E
- Country: Ghana
- Region: Volta
- Capital: Dzodze

Government
  - Municipal Chief Executive: Hon. Anthony Komla Avorgbedor

Area
  - Total: 451 km^{2} (174 sq mi)

Population (2021)
  - Total: 114,846
  - Density: 255/km^{2} (660/sq mi)
- Time zone: UTC+0 (GMT)
- ISO 3166 code: GH-TV-KN

Ketu North Municipal District, also known as Ketu-Dzigbe Municipal District, is one of the eighteen districts in Volta Region, Ghana. Originally it was formerly part of the then-larger Ketu District on 10 March 1989, which was created from the former Anlo District Council, until the northern part of the district was split off to create Ketu North District on 29 February 2008; thus the remaining part has been renamed as Ketu South District. It was later elevated to municipal district assembly status on 15 March 2018 to become Ketu North Municipal District. The municipality is located in the southeast part of Volta Region and has Dzodze as its capital town.

== Towns ==
In addition to Dzodze, the capital and administrative centre, Ketu North Municipal District contains the following villages:

- Adrume
- Agowodome
- Afife
- Dekpor-Horme
- Dekpor Yia
- Devego
- Ehie
- Ehihorme
- Kasu
- Kave
- Kporkuve
- Ohawu
- Penyi
- Tadzewu
- Weta
- Xife
- Atiteti
- Avalavi
- Klenormad

== Sources ==
- "Districts of Ghana". Statoids.
- Ketu North at GhanaDistricts.com.
