= Sarakope =

Community in Volta Region, Ghana

Sarakope Agavedzi-Sarakope
- Town
- Location of Sarakope, Ghana in Volta Region
- Coordinates: 06°30′8.9503″N 00°43′8.1613″E
- Country: Ghana
- Region: Volta Region
- District: Ketu South Municipality
- Time zone: UTC0 (GMT)

Sarakope (also known as Agavedzi-Sarakope) is a community in the Ketu South Municipality in the Volta Region of Ghana. It was formerly in the Adaklu-Anyigbe District. In 2021, the community was affected by tidal waves. In 2025, it was again affected by the tidal waves.
