= Dzodze Penyi Senior High School =

Dzodze Penyi Senior High School is located in the Ketu North District of the Volta Region, Ghana. The school was established in 1963 as a college for teacher training. The high school has 44 permanent teachers, 35 non-teaching staff, one service person and one Peace-Corps volunteer. The motto of the School is 'Stoop to Conquer.' These words were taken from a comedy titled She Stoops to Conquer, which was written by Irish author Oliver Goldsmith.

== History ==
First principal S.S. Dogbe transferred from St. Francis Teacher Training College in Hohoe in the Volta Region. In 1972, the training college was changed into a secondary school. After the change, a new principal, Tordzro, was appointed. He was assisted by Dick Ametewee.

The Ministry of Education made the decision to reject some Teacher Training Colleges in Ghana in 1971 and Dzodze Training College was one of them. Students of the training college were transferred to the Akatsi Teacher Training College, and only the last batch of teachers were left. Admission of secondary school students began in the 1971–1972 academic year.

The school has a library, science resource center, computer laboratory, visual arts workshop, boarding facility, and a standard playing field. The school enrolls 970 students; 560 male and 410 female.

== Academic programs ==
Programs offered by the school include:

- General Arts
- General Science
- Agricultural Science
- Visual Arts
- Home Economics
- Business

== Facilities ==
Over the years, classrooms, an administration block, and a boys dormitory were built for the students. A 540-capacity girls’ dormitory for completed in 2009. The Ghana Education Trust Fund (GETFund) project, executed by John Mock Construction Works, is expected to address the major challenges that female students of the school go through in their search for good residential accommodation. Then Headmaster John F.Q. Agbadi, lamented the lack of staff bungalows, which was making supervision difficult in view of the increasing student population. The school has no gates and clean water.

== Headmasters ==
Name	Year	Term
S. S. Dogbey	1963–1972	9 years
Tordzro	1972–1979	7 years
Ametewee	1979–1986	7 years
Segbefia	1986–1993	6 years
Dorvlo	1993–1996	4 years
Ebenezer Atieku	1996–2007	11 years
Doga Jacob	4 July – 29 September 2007	8 weeks
S. K Senaye	2007–2009	1 year, 4 months
Doga Jacob	30 January – 23 February 2009	24 days
Tumaku	23 February – 6 October 2009	7 months, 13 days
John Agbadi	2009–2012	3 years
C.F. Q. Nyadudzi	2012–2017	5 years
Matthew Kudroha	2017–present	

== See also ==
- Education in Ghana
- List of senior secondary schools in Ghana
- She Stoops to Conquer
