= Ho East (Ghana parliament constituency) =

Ghana parliament constituency

- constituency for the Parliament of Ghana
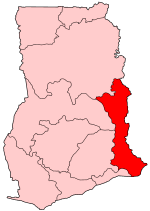
- District: Adaklu-Anyigbe District
- Region: Volta Region of Ghana

Current constituency
- Party: National Democratic Congress
- MP: Juliana Jocelyn Azumah-Mensah

Ho East is one of the constituencies represented in the Parliament of Ghana. It elects one Member of Parliament (MP) by the first past the post system of election. Ho East is located in the Adaklu-Anyigbe district of the Volta Region of Ghana.

== Boundaries ==
The seat is located entirely within the Adaklu-Anyigbe district of the Volta Region of Ghana.

== Members of Parliament ==
| First elected | Member | Party |
Ho East
| 1954 | Rev. Francis Richard Ametowobla | Independent |
| 1960 | Emmanuel Yaw Attigah | Convention People's Party |
Merger of Ho East and Ho West
Ho
| 1965 | Emmanuel Yaw Attigah | Convention People's Party |
Ho East
| 1969 | Komla Dotse Akude | National Alliance of Liberals |
| 1979 | Togbe Zokah III | People's National Party |
| 1992 | Steve Senu Akorli | National Democratic Congress |
| 2004 | Juliana Jocelyn Azumah-Mensah | National Democratic Congress |

== Elections ==
2008 Ghanaian parliamentary election: Ho East (Adaklu-Anyigbe) Source:Ghana Home Page
| Party | Candidate | Votes | % | ±% |
|---|---|---|---|---|
| National Democratic Congress | Juliana Jocelyn Azumah-Mensah | 13118 | 60.7 | 15.6 |
| Independent | Dr. Samuel Charles Kwasi Buame | 7262 | 33.6 | −9.4 |
| New Patriotic Party | Victus C. K. Avuwordah | 736 | 3.4 | −3.8 |
| Convention People's Party | Benedicta Datsomor | 241 | 1.1 | −3.1 |
| People's National Convention | Sarah Kporku | 137 | 0.6 | 0.3 |
| Democratic Freedom Party | Michael Yao Gamor | 135 | 0.6 | — |
| Majority | | 5,856 | 27.1 | — |
| Turnout | | | | — |

2004 Ghanaian parliamentary election: Ho East Source:Electoral Commission of Ghana
| Party | Candidate | Votes | % | ±% |
|---|---|---|---|---|
| National Democratic Congress | Juliana Jocelyn Azumah-Mensah | 11,348 | 45.1 | −40.5 |
| Independent | Dr. Samuel Charles Kwasi Buame | 10,812 | 43.0 | — |
| New Patriotic Party | Dzorkpe David Dickson | 1,804 | 7.2 | +3.7 |
| Convention People's Party | Gabriel Henry Kobla Gbedjoh | 1,058 | 4.2 | +3.2 |
| People's National Convention | Sarah Kporku | 79 | 0.3 | −5.2 |
| Every Ghanaian Living Everywhere | Alice Ami Gorni | 72 | 0.3 | — |
| Majority | | 536 | 2.1 | −78.0 |
| Turnout | | 25,672 | 90.7 | — |

2000 Ghanaian parliamentary election: Ho East Source:Adam Carr's Election Archives
| Party | Candidate | Votes | % | ±% |
|---|---|---|---|---|
| National Democratic Congress | Steve Senu Akorli | 20,985 | 85.6 | −5.9 |
| People's National Convention | Kathryn S. S. Akatey | 1,360 | 5.5 | 4.8 |
| National Reform Party | Bright K Kudiabor | 869 | 3.5 | — |
| New Patriotic Party | Francis Gymedzo | 866 | 3.5 | — |
| Convention People's Party | Sek Evans Donyo | 240 | 1.0 | — |
| United Ghana Movement | Gati Raymond Yao | 190 | 0.8 | — |
| Majority | | 19,625 | 80.1 | −6.9 |

1996 Ghanaian parliamentary election: Ho East Source:Electoral Commission of Ghana
| Party | Candidate | Votes | % | ±% |
|---|---|---|---|---|
| National Democratic Congress | Steve Senu Akorli | 23,791 | 91.5 | — |
| New Patriotic Party | Francis Gumedzo | 1,179 | 4.5 | — |
| People's Convention Party | Japhet Freeman Kwadzo Anku | 858 | 3.3 | — |
| People's National Convention | Issacha Humado | 179 | 0.7 | — |
| Majority | | 22,612 | 87.0 | — |
| Turnout | | 26,007 | 89.2 | 50.7 |

1992 Ghanaian parliamentary election: Ho East Source:Electoral Commission of Ghana
| Party | Candidate | Votes | % | ±% |
|---|---|---|---|---|
| National Democratic Congress | Steve Senu Akorli | | | — |
| Majority | | | | — |
| Turnout | | 16,013 | 38.5 | — |

== See also ==
- List of Ghana Parliament constituencies
