= Avoeme =

Community in Volta Region, Ghana

- Town
- Location of Avoeme in Volta Region
- Coordinates: 06°6′42.3″N 01°10′21.3″E
- Country: Ghana
- Region: Volta Region
- District: Ketu South District

Population (2010)
  - Total: 15,401
- Time zone: GMT
  - Summer (DST): GMT

Avoeme is a community in the Ketu South District in the Volta Region of Ghana.
