= Emmanuel Yaw Attigah =

Ghanaian politician

Member of the Ghana Parliament for Ho
- In office 1965–1966
- Preceded by: Constituency merged
- Succeeded by: Constituency split

Member of the Ghana Parliament for Ho East
- In office August 1960 – 1965
- Preceded by: Rev. F. R. Amewotobla
- Succeeded by: Komla Dotse Akude

Personal details
- Born: Emmanuel Yaw Attigah Gold Coast
- Party: Convention People's Party

Emmanuel Yaw Attigah was a Ghanaian politician in the first republic. He was the member of parliament for the Ho East constituency from 1960 to 1965. In 1965, he became the member of parliament for the Ho constituency, a constituency that was formed from the merging of the Ho East and Ho West constituencies.

Prior to Attigah entering parliament, the Ho East constituency was represented by Rev. F. R. Amewotobla. Rev. Amewotobla was wanted for detention under the Preventive Detention Act and consequently sought political asylum in Togo in March 1960. The Ho East seat was then declared vacant and Attigah was elected on the ticket of the Convention People's Party to occupy the seat. Attigah was sworn into office together with Hans Kofi Boni (then the new member for the Ho West constituency) on 11 August 1960.

== See also ==
- List of MLAs elected in the 1956 Gold Coast legislative election
- List of MPs elected in the 1965 Ghanaian parliamentary election
