= Agavedzi =

Community in Volta Region, Ghana

- Town
- Location of Agavedzi in Volta Region
- Coordinates: 5°59′26″N 1°02′05″E
- Country: Ghana
- Region: Volta Region
- District: Ketu South District

Population (2010)
  - Total: 2,394
- Time zone: GMT
  - Summer (DST): GMT

Agavedzi is a community in the Ketu South District in the Volta Region of Ghana.

== Institution ==
- Agavedzi Police Station
