= Akatsi North District =

District in Volta Region, Ghana

Akatsi North District Akatsi-Nord
- District
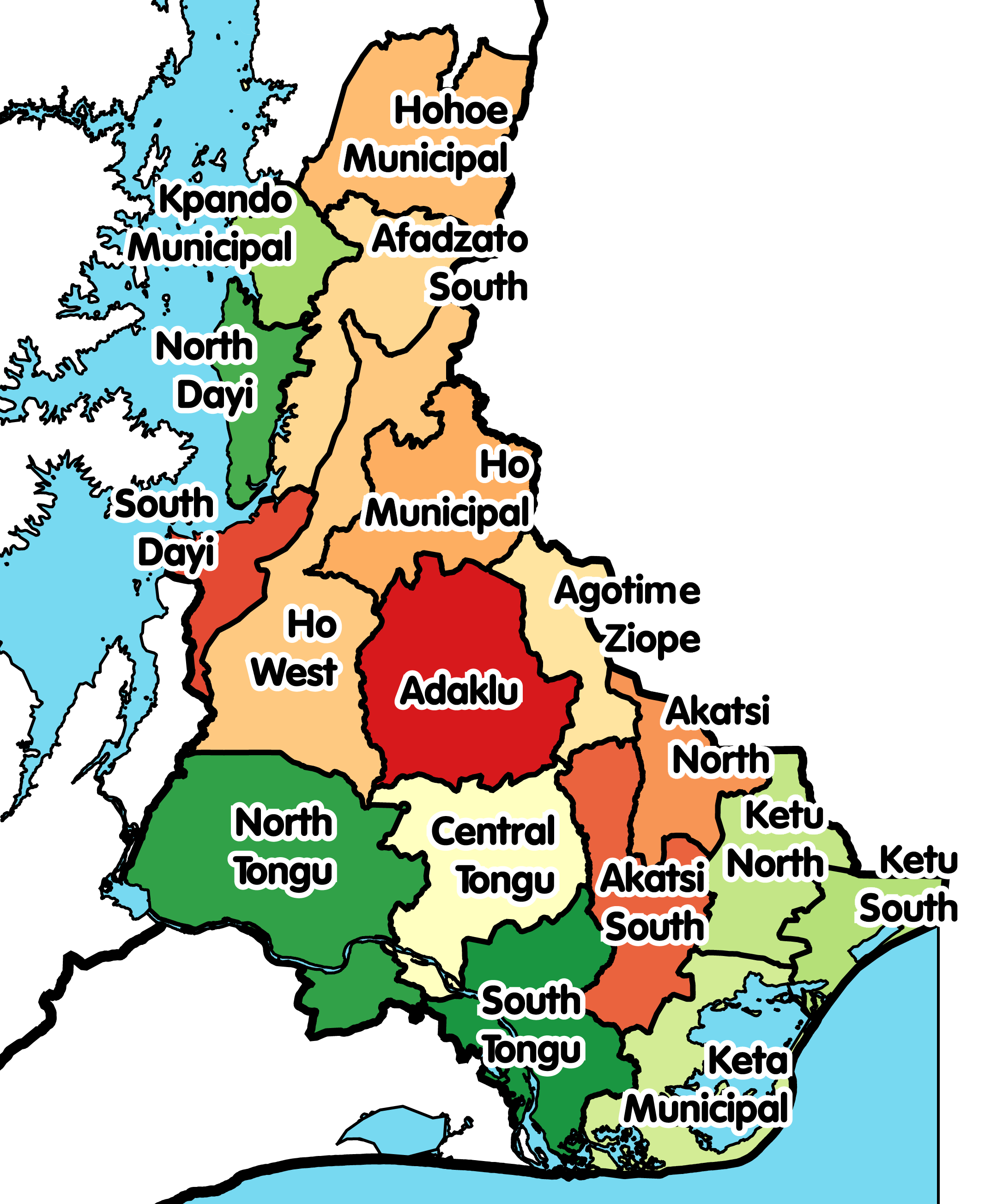
- Districts of Volta Region

- Location of Akatsi North District within Volta
- Coordinates: 6°21′45.6″N 0°51′45.3″E
- Country: Ghana
- Region: Volta
- Capital: Ave Dakpa

Government
  - District Executive: Hon. Prince Sodoke

Area
  - Total: 448 km^{2} (173 sq mi)

Population (2021)
  - Total: 32,541
  - Density: 72.6/km^{2} (188/sq mi)
- Time zone: UTC+00:00 (GMT)
- ISO 3166 code: GH-TV-AN

Akatsi North District is one of eighteen districts in Volta Region, Ghana. Originally it was formerly part of the then-larger Akatsi District on 10 March 1989, which was created from the former Anlo District Council, until the northern part of the district was split off to create Akatsi North District on 28 June 2012; under the government by then-president John Atta Mills. thus the remaining part has been renamed as Akatsi South District. The district assembly is located in the southeast part of Volta Region and has Ave Dakpa as its capital town.

== Villages ==
The following is an incomplete list of villages in the Akatsi North District.

- Ave-Amule
- Atiglime
- Ave-Afiadenyingba
- Ave-Dakpa
- Ave-Dzalele
- Avevi
- Bame
- Ave-Atanve
- Ave-Dzadzepe
- Dzrekofe
- Ave-Kpedome
- Etekofe
- Fiave
- Ave-Kpeduhoe
- Kpegbadza
- Ave-Posmonu
- Ave-Xevi
- Ave-Kpedome
- Ave-Dzayime
- Ave-Havi
- Ave-Metsrikasa
- Ave-Dzadzefe
- Agbondo
- Bame
- Hanyive
- Ave-Dzayime
- Avega
- Korve
- Kortey
- Sanyi
- Fiave
- Worta
- Kpota
- Adzigo
- Kpeta
- Adzahokorpe
- Kudzagbakorfe
- Logonkor-Glime
