= Ideal College Senior High School =

- P. O. Box L40, Legon, Accra; Greater Accra Region; Ghana

Information
- Type: Private high school
- Status: Active
- Authority: Ministry of Education
- Head teacher: Mr. Emmanuel Addo
- Grades: Forms 1–3
- Gender: Co-educational
- Classes offered: Home Economics, Science, General Arts, Business
- Language: English
- Affiliation: Seventh-day Adventist Church, Ghana
- Official website: https://idealcollegeonline.org/

Ideal College Senior High School is a co-educational second-cycle private institution in the Greater Accra Region of Ghana. The school is affiliated with the Seventh-day Adventist Church.

== Campuses ==
Ideal College operates multiple campuses across Ghana, with two main campuses located in Legon, Accra and Tema.

== Academics ==
The school offers programs in:

- Home Economics
- Science
- General Arts
- Business

The institution prepares students for the **West African Senior School Certificate Examination (WASSCE)** and emphasizes both academic excellence and moral development.

== Notable alumni ==
- Caroline Esinam Adzogble – educationist, education entrepreneur, and philanthropist

== See also ==
- Education in Ghana
- List of senior high schools in Ghana
- List of Seventh-day Adventist secondary schools
