= North Dayi =

Constituency in Ghana

- constituency for the Parliament of Ghana
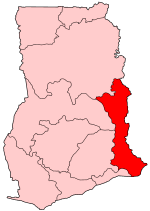
- District: Anfoega
- Region: Volta Region of Ghana

Current constituency
- Created: 2004
- Party: National Democratic Congress
- MP: Joycelyn Tetteh

North Dayi is one of the constituencies represented in the Parliament of Ghana. It elects one Member of Parliament (MP) by the first past the post system of election. North Dayi is located in the Anfoega district of the Volta Region of Ghana.

== Boundaries ==
The constituency is located within the former Kpando District of the Volta Region of Ghana. It has the South Dayi constituency to the south and the Hohoe South constituency to the east. The Hohoe North constituency is to the north-east and the Jasikan District to the north.

== Members of Parliament ==
Election	Member	Party
1992	Stephen G. Obimpeh	National Democratic Congress
2000	Akua Sena Dansua	National Democratic Congress
2012	George Loh	National Democratic Congress
2016	Joycelyn Tetteh	National Democratic Congress

== Elections ==
2024 Ghanaian general election: North Dayi
Party	Candidate	Votes	%	±%
NDC	Joycelyn Tetteh	12,778	72.46	−3.65
NPP	Edmund Attah Kudjoh	4,723	26.78	+3.27
Liberal Party of Ghana	Gloria Yayra Agbenorto	134	0.76	+0.38
Majority		8,055	45.68	−6.92
Turnout		—	—	—
Registered electors		—		

2020 Ghanaian general election: North Dayi
Party	Candidate	Votes	%	±%
NDC	Joycelyn Tetteh	14,424	76.11	−2.43
NPP	Edmund Attah Kudjoh	4,455	23.51	+20.68
Liberal Party of Ghana	Kingsley Atteh	72	0.38	—
Majority		9,969	52.60	−8.04
Turnout		—	—	—
Registered electors		—		

2016 Ghanaian general election: North Dayi
Party	Candidate	Votes	%	±%
NDC	Joycelyn Tetteh	12,948	78.53	+2.89
Independent	Wogbe Kpikpitse	2,949	17.89	
NPP	Samuel Kwesi Anomah	467	2.83	−13.65
CPP	Christopher Wise Sialeh	66	0.40	−7.48
NDP	Christopher N. A. Dotse	57	0.35	—
Majority		9,999	60.64	+1.48
Turnout		16,592	61.67	−14.46
Registered electors		26,904		

2012 Ghanaian general election: North Dayi
Party	Candidate	Votes	%	±%
NDC	George Loh	13,724	75.64	−1.06
NPP	Ken Anku	2,991	16.48	−1.42
CPP	Lorenz Jemima Exornam	1,430	7.88	+2.7
Majority		10,733	59.16	+0.36
Turnout		18,395	76.13	+11.04
Registered electors		24,162		

2008 Ghanaian parliamentary election: North Dayi
Party	Candidate	Votes	%	±%
NDC	Akua Sena Dansua	26,734	76.7	−4.0
NPP	Ken Stephen Anku	6,237	17.9	+7.0
CPP	Briku Nelson Yesutor	1,766	5.1	−4.3
DFP	Raphael Yao Menu	138	0.4	—
Majority		20,497	58.8	−11.0
Turnout		35,173	65.1	−22.7
Registered electors		54,034		

2004 Ghanaian parliamentary election:North Dayi
Party	Candidate	Votes	%	±%
NDC	Akua Sena Dansua	29,765	80.7	+6.9
NPP	Cephas Jones Donkor	4,011	10.9	+7.3
CPP	Thomas Aquinas Kwame M. Ntumy	3,118	9.4	−9.6
Majority		25,754	69.8	+15.0
Turnout		37,283	87.8	+31.0
Registered electors		42,482		

2000 Ghanaian parliamentary election:North Dayi
Party	Candidate	Votes	%	±%
NDC	Akua Sena Dansua	23,962	73.8	−17.9
CPP	Thomas Aquinas Kwame M. Ntumy	6,175	19.0	—
NPP	Seth A. Akwensivie	1,161	3.6	+1.4
United Ghana Movement	Adolf Agbodza	805	2.5	—
National Reform Party	Augustine Yawo Adjei	352	1.1	—
Majority		17,787	54.8	—
Turnout		32,785	56.8	—
Registered electors		57,744		

1996 Ghanaian parliamentary election:North Dayi
Party	Candidate	Votes	%	±%
NDC	Stephen George Obimpeh	39,445	91.7	—
People's Convention Party	Vincent Wilson Bulla	2,634	6.1	—
NPP	Augustine Yawo Adjei	944	2.2	—
Majority		36,811	85.6	—
Turnout		43,524	82.8	—
Registered electors		52,540		

1992 Ghanaian parliamentary election:North Dayi Source:
Party	Candidate	Votes	%	±%
NDC	Stephen G. Obimpeh	—	—	

== See also ==
- List of Ghana Parliament constituencies
