= James Klutse Avedzi =

Ghanaian politician

Hon Klutse Avedzi
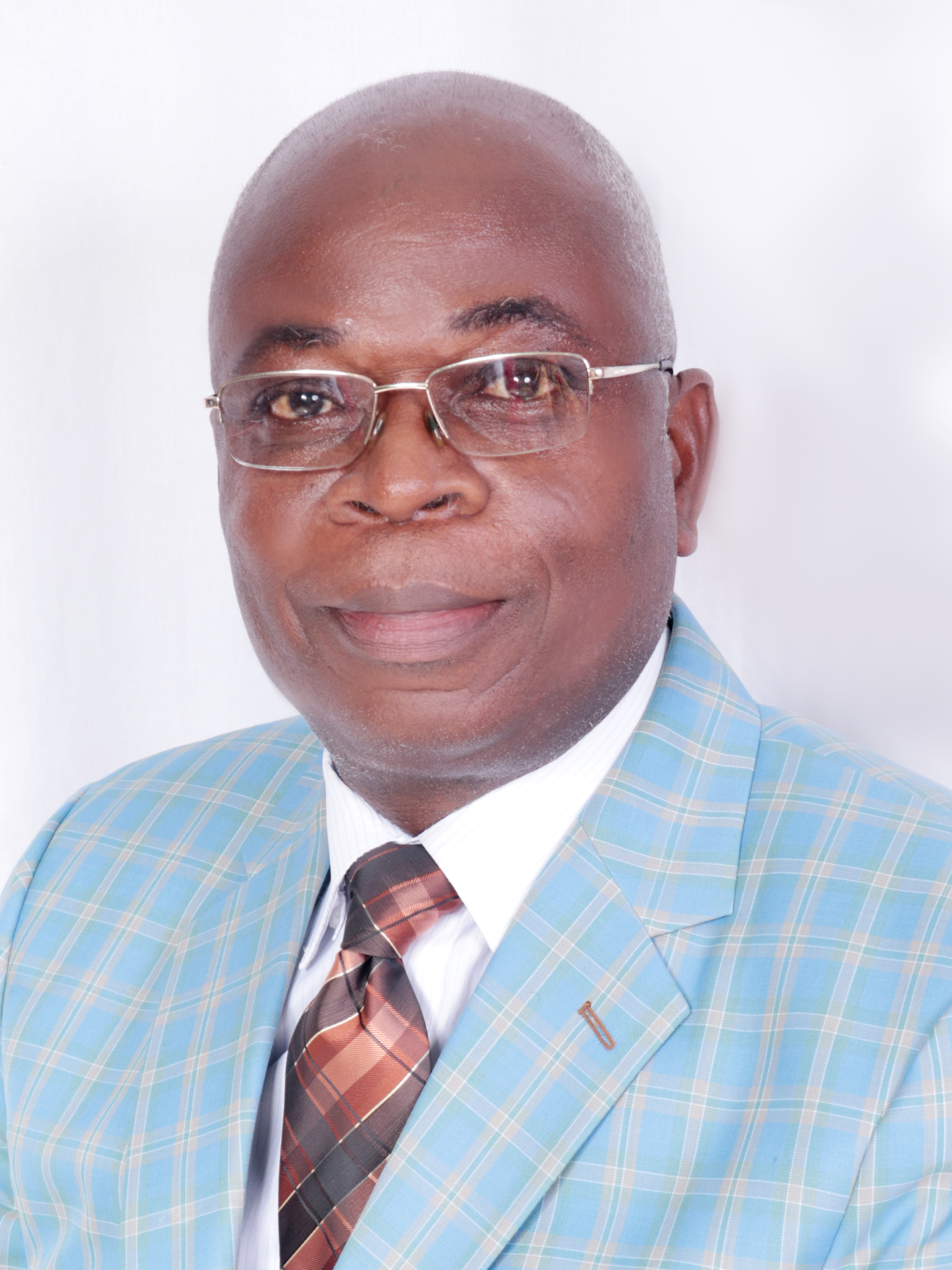

Member of the Ghana Parliament for Ketu North
- Incumbent
- Assumed office 7 January 2021

Personal details
- Born: Klutse Avedzi; 14 July 1964 (age 62) Xipe, Ghana
- Party: National Democratic Congress
- Occupation: Politician
- Committees: Public Accounts Committee, Business Committee, Trade, Industry and Tourism Committee, Committee of Selection Committee

James Klutse Avedzi (born 14 July 1964) is a Ghanaian politician and member of the Seventh Parliament of the Fourth Republic of Ghana representing the Ketu North Constituency in the Volta Region on the ticket of the National Democratic Congress.

== Early life and education ==
James Klutse Avedzi was born on 14 July 1964. He hails from Xipe in the Volta Region of Ghana. He attended University of Liverpool and graduated with a master's degree in Finance and Accounting in 2016. He further pursued a doctorate in International and Political Finance in Business at the university of Costa Rica. He also had his ICA-G from the Institute of Chartered Accountant in Ghana and also his MCIT from Ghana Chartered Institute of Taxation. He also had his Fcfia from the Chartered Institute of Financial and Investment Analysis in Ghana.

== Career ==
James Klutse Avedzi worked as the principal accountant at the Controller and Accountant Generals Department in Accra from 1995 before seeking political office in 2004. He was the former chairman of the Finance Committee in parliament of Ghana. He was also the chairman of the Public Accounts Committee of parliament. He was also the Deputy Minority Leader for the NDC in parliament.

== Political career ==
James is a member of the National Democratic congress (NDC), He contested and won the parliamentary seat for the Ketu North constituency in 2005. He has since then represented the Ketu North Constituency in the 5th, 6th and 7th Parliament of the 4th Republic of Ghana.

In 2023, he was removed from office as the Deputy Minority Leader for the NDC and was replaced by Kofi Armah Buah together with some other leaders. This decision caused tension and met some push back in the NDC leadership.

In a statement signed by NDC General Secretary, Fiifi Kwetey, Kwame Agbodza becomes the Chief Whip for the opposition side and will be deputised by Banda MP, Ahmed Ibrahim and Ada legislator, Comfort Doyo Ghansah respectively. The statement also added "the new leadership would be charged to recommend consequential changes in the Ranking membership to the Headquarters of the party for approval". But the change only annoyed the party's base across the country. In response, the party's leadership claimed the reshuffle was to engender regional balance in the party.

== Personal life ==
James is married with four children. He is a Christian who worships in the Global Evangelical Church His wife died on 30 January 2020 after being unwell for some time at the Ketu South District Hospital.

== Achievements ==
He constructed roads and gave scholarships to students in his constituency. He built schools and provided water to communities who had water problems. As the member of parliament, he connected about 150 villages to the national grid.
