= Ketu District =

- District
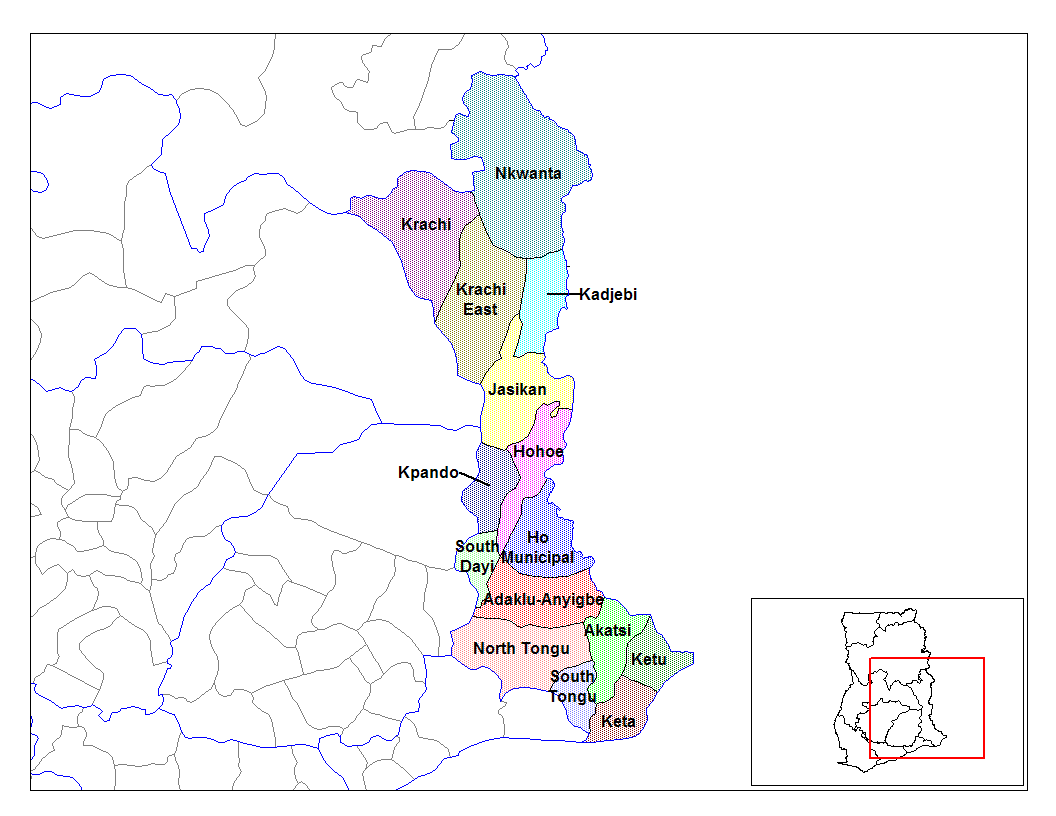
- Districts of Volta Region

- Location of Ketu District within Volta
- Coordinates: 6°06′04″N 1°08′52″E
- Country: Ghana
- Region: Volta
- Capital: Denu

Area
  - Total: 779 km^{2} (301 sq mi)

Population (2012)
  - Total: —
- Time zone: UTC+0 (GMT)
- ISO 3166 code: GH-TV-KU

Ketu District is a former district that was located in Volta Region, Ghana. Originally created as an ordinary district assembly on 10 March 1989, which was created from the former Anlo District Council. However on 29 February 2008, it was split off into two new districts: Ketu South District (which it was elevated to municipal district assembly status on 28 June 2012; capital: Denu) and Ketu North District (which it was also elevated to municipal district assembly status on 15 March 2018; capital: Dzodze). The district assembly was located in the southeast part of Volta Region and had Denu as its capital town.
