= Parliamentary Press Corps (Ghana) =

Association of Ghanaian journalists

Parliamentary Press Corps are an association of journalists who sit in the Press gallery and report proceedings of Parliament of Ghana to the media. Instituted in the fourth republic, the Parliamentary Press Corps is made up of a seven-member leadership headed by Abdulai Gariba as of 2003.
