= Steve Senu Akorli =

Ghanaian politician (1948–2019)

MP for Ho East, now Adaklu Constituency
- In office 7 January 1993 – 6 January 2005
- President: Jerry John Rawlings, John Kufuor
- Succeeded by: Juliana Azumah-Mensah

Personal details
- Born: 12 October 1948 Ho East, Volta Region Gold Coast (now Ghana)
- Died: 3 March 2019 (aged 70)
- Party: National Democratic Congress
- Occupation: Politician
- Profession: Minister

Steve Senu Akorli (12 October 1948 – 3 March 2019) was a Ghanaian politician. He was a member of the Third Parliament of the Fourth Republic representing the Ho East Constituency in the Volta Region of Ghana.

== Early life and education ==
Senu was born on 12 October 1948 at Adakpu Kpetsu in the Volta Region of Ghana.

== Politics ==
Senu was elected into the first parliament of the fourth republic of Ghana on 7 January 1993 after he was pronounced winner at the 1992 Ghanaian parliamentary election held on 29 December 1992 on the Ticket of the National Democratic Congress. He represented the Ho East Constituency in the First, Second and Third Parliament of the Fourth Republic.

== Career ==
Senu was the Minister of State for Transport during the Rawlings regime. He was also a former member of Parliament for the Ho East Constituency from 1992 to 2004 when he resigned his position.

== Death ==
Senu fell sick and died on 3 March 2019 after being admitted at the Volta Regional Hospital in Ho but was later taken by Flight to the Korle Bu Teaching Hospital where he died.

He was buried at Adakpu Kpetsu, his hometown on May 25, 2019.

== Personal life ==
Senu was married to Judith Victoria Akorli and had six children; Sitsofe, Selorm, Dela, Etornam, Jojjo and Sefakor.
