= Ave-Dakpa =

- Location in Ghana
- Coordinates: 6°21′45.6″N 0°51′45.3″E
- Country: Ghana
- Region: Volta Region
- District: Akatsi North District
- Time zone: GMT
  - Summer (DST): GMT

Ave-Dakpa is a town in the Volta Region of Ghana and the capital of the Akatsi North District. The town is known for the Ave Senior High school. The school is a second cycle institution. The town has a crocodile pond that attracts tourists from near and far.
