= George Loh =

Ghanaian politician

George Loh was the member of parliament for North Dayi in the Volta region of Ghana. He is currently the Volta Regional Vice-chairman of NDC.

== Personal life ==
Loh is married with one child. He is a Christian (Evangelical Presbyterian).

== Early life and education ==
Loh was born on 3 July 1972 in Anfoega in the Volta region. He earned LLB at the University of Ghana in 2005. He earned his BL at Ghana School of Law in 2007.

== Politics ==
Loh is a member of National Democratic Congress. He was a committee member of Constitution, Legal and Parliamentary, Public Accounts.

== Employment ==
He was a partner at Oak House and Wuuda in Accra as a barrister and solicitor from 2012. He was Associate of Hayibor, Djarbeng and Company from 2007 to 2012.
