= Sabah Zita Benson =

First female High Commissioner of Ghana to the UK and Ireland

Her Excellency Sabah Zita Benson
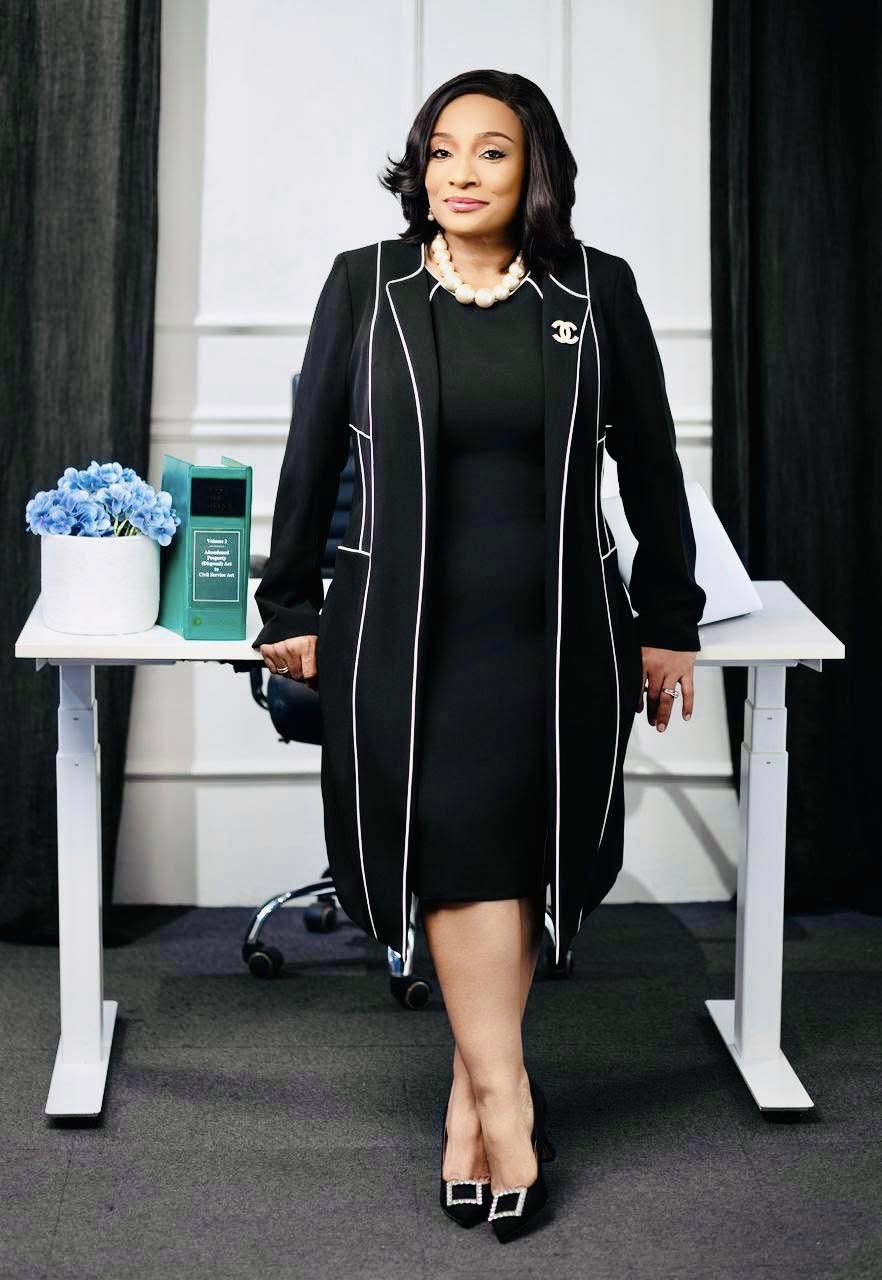

High Commissioner of Ghana to the United Kingdom and Northern Ireland
- Incumbent
- Assumed office 2025
- President: John Dramani Mahama

Former Ghana's Ambassador to the Czech Republic

Former Minister for Tourism

Former Minister for Information

Personal details
- Born: Sabah Zita Benson c. June 1975 (age 50)
- Occupation: Lawyer, diplomat, politician

Sabah Zita Benson (née Sabah Faddool) is a Ghanaian lawyer, diplomat, politician. She has been acting as Ghana's High Commissioner to the United Kingdom since 2025.

== Early life and education ==
Born Sabah Faddool to Mr. Joseph Faddool and Madam Rose Odonkor, she embraced the name “Zita” upon her confirmation into the Catholic Church at age 13 during her time at Archbishop Porter Girls’ Secondary School in Takoradi. Her roots in leadership and public performance were evident even then, as a member of the cadet corps, debate team, and a recurring Angel Gabriel in school plays.

Sabah Zita Benson holds a Bachelor of Arts in English and Law from the Kwame Nkrumah University of Science and Technology (1996–1999). She earned her LLB from the University of Ghana (2002–2004) and was called to the bar at the Ghana School of Law (2006). She later pursued a Master of Laws (LL.M.) in Oil and Gas at the University of Ghana (2012–2014).

== Career ==
=== Public service ===
In 2009, she was appointed Ghana's Minister of Information, where she focused on government communication reforms, including the production of the documentary 'The People Must Know'.

From 2010 to 2011, she became the youngest woman appointed as Minister of State in Ghana, serving as Minister of Information and later as Minister of Tourism under President John Evans Atta Mills. Under her leadership was passing of the Tourism Bill, oversaw the establishment of a hospitality training school, and facilitated the opening of tourism offices in New York and London.

She served as Ghana's ambassador to the Czech Republic from 2014 to 2016. Her tenure saw the signing of bilateral agreements with Hungary, including visa-free travel for diplomatic passport holders and the re-establishment of Hungary's embassy in Accra. She also served as Ghana's Ambassador to the Czech Republic, with concurrent accreditation to Slovakia, Hungary, Romania, and North Macedonia.

As of 2025, she was named Ghana's High Commissioner to the United Kingdom and Northern Ireland. Her nomination was formally confirmed in May 2025 and commissioned on 4 September 2025 by President John Mahama in Accra. Benson's appointment was the first time a woman was named as Ghana's High Commissioner to the United Kingdom and Northern Ireland.

== Political and civic engagement ==
Benson was the NDC Parliamentary Candidate for Dome-Kwabenya in the 2008 elections. She has held various leadership roles in political committees and campaigns, including as founder of the Finishing Hard NDC Campaign Team (2022–2024) and co-founder of the Boots on the Ground Campaign for Election 2024.

== Personal life ==
She is married to Bobby Benson, a pharmacist. Together, they have 3 children.

== See also ==
- List of ambassadors and high commissioners of Ghana
