= Juliana Azumah-Mensah =

Ghanaian politician and nurse

Hon. Juliana Jocelyn Azumah-Mensah

Member of the Ghana Parliament for Ho East
- In office Jan 2005 – 2012
- Preceded by: Steve Senu Akorli
- Majority: 5,856

Minister for Women and Children's Affairs
- In office January 2010 – 2012
- President: John Atta Mills
- Preceded by: Akua Sena Dansua

Personal details
- Born: 15 June 1950 (age 76) Koforidua, Ghana
- Party: National Democratic Congress
- Children: 2
- Education: Ola Secondary School; University of Birmingham
- Profession: Politician, Nurse

Juliana Jocelyn Azumah-Mensah (born 15 June 1950) is a Ghanaian politician and nurse. She was the Minister for Women and Children's Affairs. She is also the Member of Parliament for Ho East constituency.

== Early life and education ==
Juliana Azumah-Mensah was born at Koforidua, capital of the Eastern Region of Ghana. Between 1956 and 1964, she attended the Roman Catholic Primary and Local Authority Middle Schools at Agortime-Kpetoe in the Volta Region. She had her secondary education at OLA Girls Senior High School (Ho) at Ho, capital of the Volta Region, where she obtained the GCE Ordinary Level in 1969.

She proceeded to the United Kingdom where she trained at the Ipswich East Anglia School of Nursing at Ipswich, Suffolk. She qualified in August 1973 as a State Registered Nurse. A year later, she trained in Midwifery at Saint Peter's Hospital at Chertsey in Surrey, graduating in August 1975 as a State Certified Midwife.

She enrolled at the University of Birmingham for postgraduate studies, leading to her obtaining an MSc in Health Management and Administration in October 1997.

== Career ==
Azumah-Mensah started work as a clerical officer at the Ministry of Finance and Economic Planning in 1969. She left for further studies in the UK after a year. She then worked as a nurse and midwife at various hospitals in the UK.

She moved to Saudi Arabia, where she worked at the King Abdulaziz University Hospital between 1978 and 1984. She returned to the UK, working at the Mayday University Hospital between 1984 and 1987.

She returned to Ghana in 1988 and worked for two years as the Principal Nurse in the Ho Diocese. Between 2001 and 2005, she worked with the Catholic Health Services. She was stationed at Ho, where she served as the Executive Secretary/Director of Health Services of the Ho Diocese and the Regional Co-ordinating Director.

== Politics ==
Juliana Azumah-Mensah was first elected Member of Parliament for the Ho East Constituency on the ticket of the National Democratic Congress (NDC) in the 2004 parliamentary election and took her seat in January 2005. She retained her seat in the 2008 election.

She was first appointed by President John Atta Mills as Minister for Tourism in 2009. She was shifted to Minister for Women and Children's Affairs in January 2010, until 2012.

== Personal life ==
She is married with two children. She hails from Agortime-Kpetoe in the Volta Region of Ghana.

== See also ==
- List of Mills government ministers
- Ho East (Ghana parliament constituency)

Parliament of Ghana
Preceded by Steve Senu Akorli	Ho East; 2005–present	Incumbent
Political offices
Preceded by	Minister for Tourism; 2009–10	Succeeded by Zita Okaikoi
Preceded by Akua Dansua	Minister for Women and Children's Affairs; 2010–present	Incumbent
