= Dzodze =

- District Capital
- Location in Ghana
- Coordinates: 6°14′13.27″N 0°59′46.14″E
- Country: Ghana
- Region: Volta Region
- District: Ketu North Municipality
- Founder: Torgbui Adzofia
  - UZTAC: (Dzodze Urban Council)
- Elevation: 64 m (210 ft)
- Time zone: GMT
  - Summer (DST): GMT
- Website: Dzodze.org

Dzodze is a small town, the capital and administrative centre of Ketu North Municipal District in the south eastern corner of the Volta Region of Ghana. From the Exodus of the Ewe people, some of them arrived and stayed in Dzodze, in the Volta Region of Ghana after the fall of the wall of Notse. The natives speak Ewe (Eʋe) and English, the main languages in Dzodze. They are an Anlo-Ewe community. The traditional rhythm of this land is Agbadza, and Ageshe.

== Geography ==
=== Location ===
Dzodze is located near the border between Togo and Ghana, and lies 199 kilometers from the capital of Ghana, Accra through Tokor and 87 kilometers from Ho, the regional capital.

=== Suburbs or Electoral Areas ===
Ablorme, Adagbledu, Fiagbedu, Apeyeme, Apetepe, Afiadenyigba, Kpordoave, Kave/Awlikorpe, Kasu/Tsiaveme/Torfoe, Kpelikorpe/Heheme, Kuli/Dzogbefime, Dorwuime/Bokorgakorpe and Deme/Tornu

== Ablorme ==
Ablorme is among the suburbs that make up the Dzodze community. After residents had been in wait for many years, a new chief and queenmother were enstooled in 2022. They are currently Mr Angelis Dzakpasu and Madam Edo Nancy Amable under the stool names, Togbuiga Adisre VII (The official Paramount Chief of The Dzodze Traditional Council) and Mamaga Gbewodo II respectively.

== Demographics ==
The inhabitants of Dzodze are primarily Ghanaian nationals who settled down after the exodus of Ewe people from Notsie in Togo to the Southwest of Ghana sometime in the later part of the seventeenth century. The Ewe and French languages are the most widely spoken languages in the town.

== Meaning of Dzodze ==
Dzodze is in the Ewe language: Dzo = to fly. Dze = to land. Dzodze = flew and landed. According to the history, Torgbui Ashite managed to cross the Aka river and settled on the part of the forest. One day when he was working in his farm Adisre met him in his farm and questioned him as to how he got here and he replied 'De mie dzo va dze.' (we flew and landed). Hence the name Dzodze.

== Production ==
Dzodze is widely known for palm cultivation, which is further transformed into palm oil, palm wine, Akpteteshie (Local Gin).

Dzodze currently hosts four radio stations, namely Fafa FM, Denyigba radio and Dzigbordi Radio.

== Education ==
Dzodze has a wide range of educational facilities; kindergarten, Primary Schools, Junior High Schools and Dzodze Penyi Senior High School.

== Festival ==
Dzodze celebrates an annual festival called "Deza" which means "Palm Festival".
