= Anlo District =

- Former District Council
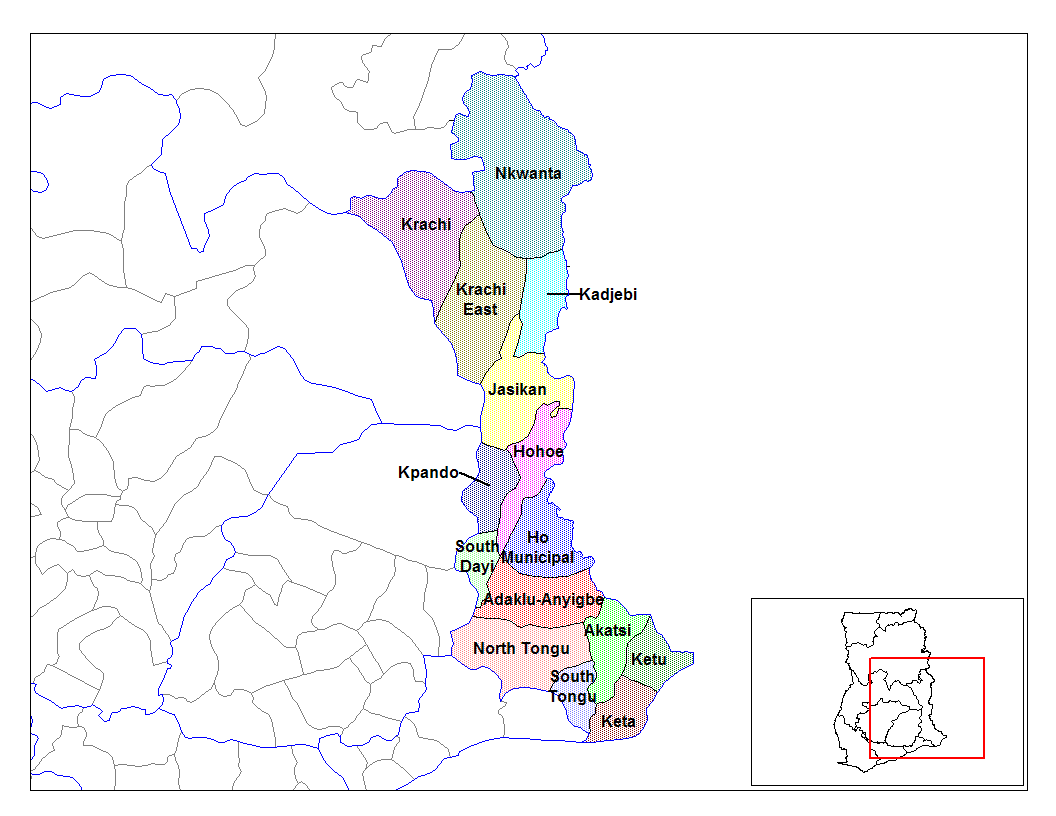
- Districts of Volta Region

- Location of Anlo District within Volta
- Coordinates: 5°54′11.16″N 0°59′12.48″E
- Country: Ghana
- Region: Volta
- Capital: Keta
- Time zone: UTC+0 (GMT)
- ISO 3166 code: GH-TV-__

Anlo District is a former district council that was located in Volta Region, Ghana. Originally created as an ordinary district assembly in 1975. However, on 10 March 1989, it was split off into three new district assemblies: Keta District (capital: Keta), Ketu District (capital: Denu) and Akatsi District (capital: Akatsi). The district assembly was located in the southern part of Volta Region and had Keta as its capital town.
