= Komla Dotse Akude =

Ghanaian politician

Member of the Ghana Parliament for Ho East
- In office 1969–1972
- Preceded by: Military government
- Succeeded by: Parliament dissolved

Personal details
- Born: 15 September 1936
- Citizenship: Ghana
- Education: University of Ghana; Presbyterian College of Education, Akropong
- Occupation: Teacher

Komla Dotse Akude is a Ghanaian politician and member of the first parliament of the second republic of Ghana representing Ho East Constituency under the membership of the National Alliance of Liberals (NAL).

== Education and early life ==
He was born 15 September 1936 in Volta Region of Ghana. He attended Presbyterian College of Education, Akropong where he obtained his Teachers' Training Certificate. He also obtained his Bachelor of Arts degree in Sociology from the University of Ghana, Legon.

== Politics ==
Akude began his political career in 1969 when he became the parliamentary candidate for the National Alliance of Liberals (NAL) to represent Ho East constituency prior to the commencement of the 1969 Ghanaian parliamentary election. He assumed office as a member of the first parliament of the second republic of Ghana on 1 October 1969 after being pronounced winner at the 1969 Ghanaian parliamentary election and was later suspended following the overthrow of the Busia government on 13 January 1972.

== Personal life ==
He is a Presbyterian. He is a Teacher.

== See also ==
- Busia government
- List of MPs elected in the 1969 Ghanaian parliamentary election
