= List of MPs elected in the 2000 Ghanaian parliamentary election =

Colonial Era
1951 Assembly	(election)
1954 Assembly	(election)
1956 Assembly	(election)
First Republic
1957 Parliament	(election)
1965 Parliament	(election)
Second Republic
1969 Parliament	(election)
Third Republic
1979 Parliament	(election)
Fourth Republic
1st Parliament	(1992)
2nd Parliament	(1996)
3rd Parliament	(2000)
4th Parliament	(2004)
5th Parliament	(2008)
6th Parliament	(2012)
7th Parliament	(2016)
8th Parliament	(2020)
9th Parliament	(2024)

This is a list of members of Parliament (MPs) elected to the Parliament of Ghana for the Third Parliament of the Fourth Republic of Ghana at the 2000 parliamentary election, held on 7 December 2000.

The list is arranged by region and constituency. New MPs elected since the general election and changes in party allegiance are noted at the bottom of the page.

== Composition after election ==
Affiliation	Members
New Patriotic Party (NPP)	100
National Democratic Congress (NDC)	92
People's National Convention (PNC)	3
Convention People's Party (CPP)	1
Independent	4
Speaker and Deputies	(3)
Total	200
Government Majority	0

== List of MPs elected in the general election ==
The following table is a list of MPs elected on 7 December 2000, ordered by region and constituency. The previous MP and previous party column shows the MP and party holding the seat.

Table of contents:

Ashanti Region • Brong Ahafo Region • Central Region • Eastern Region • Greater Accra Region
Northern Region • Upper East Region • Upper West Region • Volta Region • Western Region
Postponed poll • By-elections • Notes and References • See also • External links and sources

=== Ashanti Region - 33 seats ===
Constituency	Elected MP	Elected Party	Majority	Previous MP	Previous Party	
Adansi Asokwa	Kobina T. Hammond	NPP	3,076	John Gyasi	NDC	
Afigya-Sekyere East	Kwesi Akomia Kyeremateng	NPP	17,227	Kwesi Akomia Kyeremateng	NPP	
Afigya-Sekyere West	Albert Kan-Dapaah	NPP	6,799	Albert Kan-Dapaah	NPP	
Ahafo Ano North	Kwame Owusu Frimpong	NPP	1,648	Annor Baffour	NDC	
Ahafo Ano South	Stephen K. Balado Manu	NPP	4,963	Stephen K. Balado Manu	NPP	
Amansie West	Stephen Cobbinah B. Karikari	NPP	22,945	Anthony Boakye-Yiadom	NPP	
Asante Akim North	Kwadwo Baah-Wiredu	NPP	20,489	Kwadwo Baah-Wiredu	NPP	
Asante Akim South	Alex Kwaku Korankye	NPP	5,306	Alex Kwaku Korankye	NPP	
Asokwa East	Dr. Edward Baffoe Bonnie	NPP	31,982	Ahmed Musah	NDC	
Asokwa West	Edward Osei-Kwaku	NPP	35,238	Edward Osei-Kwaku	NPP	
Atwima/Kwanwoma	Dr. Matthew Kwaku Antwi	NPP	16,986	Dr. Matthew Kwaku Antwi	NPP	
Atwima Mponua	Akwasi Dante Afriyie	NPP	8,153	Akwasi Dante Afriyie	NPP	
Atwima Nwabiagya	James Edusei Sarkodie	NPP	31,079	James Edusei Sarkodie	NPP	
Bantama	Dr. Richard Winfred Anane	NPP	77,970^{i}	Dr. Richard Winfred Anane	NPP	
Bekwai	Ignatius K. Poku Edusei	NPP	26,551	Alexander Agyei-Acheampong	NPP	
Bosome-Freho	Gabriel Yaw Amoah	NPP	5,862	Gabriel Yaw Amoah	NPP	
Bosomtwe	Poku Adu-Gyamfi	NPP	7,799	Poku Adu-Gyamfi	NPP	
Effiduase-Asokore	Grace Coleman	NPP	9,546	Grace Coleman	NPP	
Ejisu-Juabeng	Akwasi Osei-Adjei	NPP	25,866	Akwasi Osei-Adjei	NPP	
Ejura Sekyedumasi	Sampson Atakora	NDC	2,781	Peter Boakye-Ansah	NPP	
Fomena	Akwasi Afrifa	NPP	6,602	Akwasi Afrifa	NPP	
Kumawu	Reo Addai Basoah	NPP	7,497	Reo Addai Basoah	NPP	
Kwabre	Nana Asante Frimpong	NPP	33,745	Nana Asante Frimpong	NPP	
Mampong	Solomon Kwabena Sarfoh	NPP	17,066	Solomon Kwabena Sarfoh	NPP	
Manhyia	Dr. Kwame Addo-Kufuor	NPP	51,823	Dr. Kwame Addo-Kufuor	NPP	
New Edubease	Theresa Joyce Baffoe	NDC	5,073	Theresa Joyce Baffoe	NDC	
Nsuta-Kwamang	Kwame Osei Prempeh	NPP	6,679	Kwame Osei Prempeh	NPP	
Obuasi	Anthony Bright Boadi-Mensah	NPP	28,776	Anthony Bright Boadi-Mensah	NPP	
Odotobri	Samuel Nkrumah Gyimah	NPP	14,816	Samuel Nkrumah Gyimah	NPP	
Offinso North	Kofi Konadu Apraku	NPP	4,982	Kofi Konadu Apraku	NPP	
Offinso South	Kwabena Sarfo	NPP	13,436	Francis Kwasi Buor	NPP	
Old Tafo Suame	Osei Kyei Mensah Bonsu	NPP	50,431	Osei Kyei Mensah Bonsu	NPP	
Subin	Sampson Kwaku Boafo	NPP	35,830	Sampson Kwaku Boafo	NPP	
=== Brong Ahafo Region - 21 seats ===
Constituency	Elected MP	Elected Party	Majority	Previous MP	Previous Party	
Asunafo North	Benjamin Osei Kuffour	NPP	6,458	David Kwasi Amankwah	NDC	
Asunafo South	George William Amponsah	NPP	1,976	Francis Adu-Poku	NDC	
Asutifi North	Paul Okoh	NPP	787	Emmanuel Baah Danquah	NDC	
Asutifi South	Cecilia Djan Amoah^{a}	NPP	550	Collins Dauda	NDC	
Atebubu North	David Yaw Mensah	NDC	9,104	David Yaw Mensah	NDC	
Atebubu South	Amadu Ali	NDC	3,645	Amadu Ali	NDC	
Berekum	Capt. Nkrabeah Effah Dartey	NPP	10,895	J.H. Owusu Acheampong	NDC	
Dormaa East	Stephen Adoma-Yeboah	NPP	4,183	Nicholas K. Adjei-Kyeremeh	NDC	
Dormaa West	Yaw Asiedu Mensah	NPP	2,713	Thomas Kwame Yeboah	NDC	
Jaman	Anna Nyamekye	NPP	913	Nicholas Appiah-Kubi	NDC	
Kintampo	Yaw Effah Baafi	NDC	1,095	Gladys Abena Nsoah	NDC	
Nkoranza	Hayford Francis Amoako	NDC	1,444	Theresa Nyarko-Fofie	NDC	
Sene	Felix Twumasi-Appiah	NDC	9,415	Yaw Nana Otto	NDC	
Sunyani East	Joseph Henry Mensah	NPP	16,206	Joseph Henry Mensah (Minority Leader)	NPP	
Sunyani West	Kwadwo Adjei-Darko	NPP	3,712	Kwadwo Adjei-Darko	NPP	
Tano North	Joe Donkor	NPP	4,047	Joe Donkor	NPP	
Tano South	Andrews Adjei-Yeboah	NPP	4,118	Grace Boachie	NDC	
Techiman North	Isaac Kwadwo Adjei Mensah	NDC	297	Isaac Kwadwo Adjei Mensah	NDC	
Techiman South	Prince Oduro-Mensah	NPP	414	Kwadwo Mama Adams	NDC	
Wenchi East	Alhaji Moctar Musah Bambah	NPP	4,391	Alhaji Moctar Musah Bambah	NPP	
Wenchi West	Johnson Asiedu Nketia	NDC	679	Johnson Asiedu Nketia	NDC	
=== Central Region - 17 seats ===
Constituency	Elected MP	Elected Party	Majority	Previous MP	Previous Party	
Abura-Asebu-Kwamankese	Harry Halifax-Hayford	NDC	1,120	J. E. Afful	NDC	
Agona East	Kwaku Adu Yeboah	NDC	325	Kojo Yankah	NDC	
Agona West	Samuel Kweku Obodai	NPP	7,659	Samuel Oppong	NDC	
Ajumako-Enyan-Essiam	Isaac Eduasar Edumadze	NPP	2,655	Isaac Eduasar Edumadze	NPP	
Asikuma-Odoben-Brakwa	Paul C. Appiah-Ofori	NPP	2666	Ebenezer Kobina Fosu	NDC	
Assin North	Kennedy Agyapong	NPP	5,995	Florence Kumi	NDC	
Assin South	Dominic Kwaku Fobih	NPP	6,109	Kwaku Al-Hassan Dadzie	NDC	
Awutu - Senya	Hanna Tetteh K. Kpodar	NDC	6,174	Babalami Abu-Sadat	NDC	
Cape Coast	Christine Churcher	NPP	8,023	Christine Churcher	NPP	
Effutu	Mike Allen Hammah	NDC	246	Mike Allen Hammah	NDC	
Gomoa East	Emmanuel Acheampong^{e}	NPP	568	Thomas Kweku Aubyn	NDC	
Gomoa West	Ama Benyiwa-Doe	NDC	1,747	Ama Benyiwa-Doe	NDC	
Komenda-Edina-Eguafo-Abbrem	Ato Quarshie	NDC	967	Ato Quarshie	NDC	
Mfantsiman East	Comfort Owusu (Deputy Majority Whip)	NDC	7,110	Comfort Owusu (Deputy Majority Whip)	NDC	
Mfantsiman West	Jacob Scherrer Arthur	NDC	2,190	Jacob Scherrer Arthur	NDC	
Twifo/Hemang-Lower-Denkyira	Abraham Owusu Baidoo	NDC	1,637	John Kweku Kumah	NDC	
Upper Denkyira	Charles Omar Nyanor^{g}	NPP	12,659	Clement Charles Omar Nyanor	NPP	
=== Eastern Region - 26 seats ===
Constituency	Elected MP	Elected Party	Majority	Previous MP	Previous Party	
Abetifi	Eugene Atta Agyepong	NPP	3,046	Eugene Atta Agyepong	NPP	
Abuakwa	Nana Addo Dankwa Akufo-Addo	NPP	14,147	Nana Addo Dankwa Akufo-Addo	NPP	
Afram Plains North	Joseph Tsatsu Agbenu	NDC	14,833	Krosby Mensah	NDC	
Afram Plains South	Kwakye Addo	NDC	2,351	Kwakye Addo	NDC	
Akim Oda	Yaw Osafo-Maafo	NPP	10,943	Yaw Osafo-Maafo	NPP	
Akim Swedru	Felix Owusu Adjapong	NPP	5,047	Felix Owusu Adjapong	NPP	
Akropong	Agyare Koi Larbi	NPP	34	Agyare Koi Larbi	NPP	
Akwapim South	Seth Dankwa Wiafe	NPP	6,429	Vida Amaadi Yeboah	NDC	
Akwatia	Kinston Akomeng Kissi	NPP	1,736	Mohammed Erzuah Siam	NDC	
Asuogyaman	Dwamena Bekoe	NDC	2,326	Kwamena Dwamena-Aboagye	NDC	
Atiwa	Yaw Brempong Yeboah	NPP	10,230	Yaw Baning-Darko	NPP	
Ayensuano	Godfred Otchere	NPP	2,418	Evans Kodjo Ahorsey	NDC	
Birim North	Dr. William Boakye Akoto	NPP	1,840	Kweku Boateng-Lovinger	NDC	
Fanteakwa	Samuel Ofosu Ampofo	NDC	1,378	Samuel Ofosu Ampofo	NDC	
Kade	Ofosu Asamoah	NPP	8950	Francis Kwame Nyarko	NPP	
Koforidua	Yaw Barima	NPP	10,848	Yaw Barima	NPP	
Lower Manya Krobo	Michael Teye Nyaunu	NDC	4,585	Michael Teye Nyanua	NDC	
Lower West Akim	Peter Kwaw	NPP	5,335	Akuamoa Ofosu-Boateng	NDC	
Mpraeso	Francis Osafo Mensah	NPP	2,762	Francis Osafo Mensah	NPP	
New Juabeng North	Hackman Owusu-Agyeman	NPP	10,213	Hackman Owusu-Agyeman	NPP	
Nkawkaw	Kwabena Adusa Okerchiri	NPP	11,907	Kwabena Adusa Okerchiri	NPP	
Okere	Brandford Kwame Daniel Adu	NPP	9^{h}	Fuzzy Dapaah Torbay	NDC	
Suhum	Ransford Agyapong	NPP	4,126	Solomon Kodjoe Akwetey	NDC	
Upper Manya Krobo	Stephen Amoanor Kwao	NDC	8,644	Solomon Tettey Terkper	NDC	
Upper West Akim	Samuel Sallas Mensa	NDC	3,167	Samuel Sallas Mensa	NDC	
Yilo Krobo	Daniel Tekpertey	NDC	4,696	Daniel Tekpertey	NDC	4696
=== Greater Accra Region - 22 seats ===
Constituency	Elected MP	Elected Party	Majority	Previous MP	Previous Party	
Ablekuma Central	Victor Okuley Nortey	NPP	8,175	Victor Okuley Nortey	NPP	
Ablekuma North	Kwamena Bartels	NPP	20,272	Kwamena Bartels	NPP	
Ablekuma South	Theresa Ameley Tagoe	NPP	14,622	Theresa Ameley Tagoe	NPP	
Ada	Amos Lawerh Buertey	NDC	3,629	Amos Lawerh Buertey	NDC	
Ashaiman	Emmanuel Kinsford Kwesi Teye	NPP	1,806	Franklin W.K. Aheto	NDC	
Ayawaso Central	Sheikh Ibrahim Cudjoe Quaye	NPP	10,240	Sheikh Ibrahim Cudjoe Quaye (Deputy Minority Chief Whip)	NPP	
Ayawaso West-Wuogon	George Isaac Amoo	NPP	6,167	Mrs Rebecca Akweley Adotey	NDC	
Dade-Kotopon	Godfried Ako-Nai	NPP	6,728	Sylvester A. Mensah	NDC	
Ayawaso East	Mustapha Ahmed	NDC	553	Farouk Braimah	NDC	
Ga North	Sampson Ottu Darkoh	NPP	15,438	Sampson Ottu Darkoh	NPP	
Ga South	Ernest Attoquaye Armah	NDC	11,320	Margaret Clarke Kwesie	NDC	
Klottey Korle	Nii Adu Daku Mantey	NPP	9,018	David Lamptey	NDC	
Kpone-Katamanso	Afieye Ashong	NDC	2,354	Afieye Ashong	NDC	
Krowor	Emmanuel Adjei Boye	NPP	1,302	Joshua Alabi	NDC	
Ledzokuku	Eddie Akita	NPP	6,101	Nii Adjei-Boye Sekan (Deputy Majority Whip)	NDC	
Ningo-Prampram	Enoch Teye Mensah	NDC	10,743	Enoch Teye Mensah	NDC	
Odododiodoo	Reginald Niibi Ayi-Bonte	NPP	4,089	Nii Okaidja Adamafio	NDC	
Okaikwei North	Joseph Darko Mensah	NPP	12,045	Joseph Darko Mensah	NPP	
Okaikwei South	Nana Akomea	NPP	17,719	Nana Akomea	NPP	
Shai-Osudoku	Michael Afedi Gizo	NDC	5,718	Michael Afedi Gizo	NDC	
Tema East	Ishmael Ashitey	NDC	18,609	Ishmael Ashitey	NDC	
Tema West	Abraham Ossei Aidooh	NPP	14,787	Abraham Ossei-Aidooh	NPP	
=== Northern Region - 23 seats ===
Constituency	Elected MP	Elected Party	Majority	Previous MP	Previous Party	
Bimbilla	Mohamed Ibn Chambas^{b}	NDC	9,494	George Mpambi Dagmanyi	PNC	
Bole	John Dramani Mahama	NDC	6,543	John Dramani Mahama	NDC	
Bunkpurugu/Yunyoo	Namburr Berrick	NDC	1,045	Joseph Yaani Labik	NDC	
Chereponi	Mohammed Seidu Abah	NDC	2,391	Alhaji Innocent Mahamadu Yahaya	NDC	
Chogu/Tishigu	Alhaji Abubakari Sumani	NDC	352	Ibrahim Adam	NDC	
Damango/Daboya	Alex Sofo	NPP	347	Adam Mahama	NDC	
Gukpegu/Sabongida	Mustapha Ali Iddris	NPP	2,564	Mustapha Ali Iddris	NPP	
Gushiegu/Karaga	Iddrisu Huudu	NDC	5,838	Iddrisu Huudu	NDC	
Kpandai	Lipkalimor Kwajo Tawiah	NDC	5,786	Lipkalimor Kwajo Tawiah	NDC	
Kumbungu	Muhammed Mumuni	NDC	8,778	Muhammad Mumuni	NDC	
Mion	Adams Ebenezer Mahama	NDC	547	Alabira Ibrahim	CPP	
Nalerigu	Dr. Tia Alfred Sugri	NDC	2,984	Isaac Kolibilla Batesimah	NDC	
Nanton	Alhaji Alhassan Yakubu	NDC	1,017	Alhaji Alhassan Yakubu	NDC	
Saboba	Nayon Bilijo	NDC	4,716	Moses Mabengba Bukari	NDC	
Salaga	Boniface Abubakar Saddique	Independent	1,821	Hamidu Baba Braimah	NDC	
Savelugu	Mary Salifu Boforo	NDC	7,696	Mary Salifu Boforo	NDC	
Sawla-Kalba	Joseph Trumah Bayel	NDC	6,263	Joseph Trumah Bayel	NDC	
Tolon	Alhaji Abdulai Salifu	NDC	3,039	Alhaji Abdulai Salifu		
West Mamprusi (Walewale)	Alhaji Issifu Azumah	PNC	6,172	Susana Adam	NDC	
Wulensi	Samuel Nyimakan^{c}	NDC	2,653	Iddi Saani	NPP	
Yapei/Kusawgu	Alhaji Amadu Seidu	NDC	5,095	Alhaji Amadu Seidu	NDC	
Yendi	Malik Al-Hassan Yakubu	NPP	2,092	Malik Al-Hassan Yakubu	NPP	
Zabzugu-Tatale	Jagri Mohammed	NDC	4,067	John Jagri Kokpah	NDC	
=== Upper East Region - 12 seats ===
Constituency	Elected MP	Elected Party	Majority	Previous MP	Previous Party	
Bawku Central	Hawa Yakubu	NPP	874	Fati Seidu	NDC	
Bawku West	Cletus Apul Avoka	NDC	4,129	Cletus Apul Avoka	NDC	
Binduri	Achidago B. Akugri	NDC	8,612	Fortunate Atubiga	NDC	
Bolgatanga	David Apasara	PNC	7,575	Simon Anyoa Abingya	NDC	
Bongo	Albert Abongo	NDC	8,598	Simon Alangde Asabo	NDC	
Builsa North	Theodore Basil Anuka	NDC	422	Theodore Basil Anuka	NDC	
Builsa South	Norbert Garko Awulley	NDC	1,223	Norbert Garko Awullay	NDC	
Chiana / Paga	Abuga Pele	NDC	10,704	Pele Abugu	NDC	
Garu/Tempane	Joseph Akudibilla	Independent	2,058	Dominic Azimbe Azumah	NDC	
Nabdam	Moses Aduku Asaga	NDC	2,144	Moses Aduku Asaga	NDC	
Navrongo Central	John Setuni Achuliwor^{d}	NPP	143	Clement Tumfugah Bugase	NDC	
Talensi	John Akologu Tia	NDC	2,048	John Akologu Tia	NDC	
=== Upper West Region - 8 seats ===
Constituency	Elected MP	Elected Party	Majority	Previous MP	Previous Party	
Jirapa	Edward Kojo Salia	NDC	15,066	Francis G. Korbieh	NDC	
Lambussie	Alice Teni Boon	NDC	4,604	Alice Teni Boon	NDC	
Lawra/Nandom	Benjamin Kumbuor	NDC	18,777	Anthony Bondong	NDC	
Nadowli North	Alban Sumana Bagbin	NDC	5,593	Alban Sumana Bagbin	NDC	
Nadowli South	Emmanuel Samba Zumakpeh	NDC	4,472	Emmanuel Samba Zumakpeh	NDC	
Sissala	Moses Dani Baah	PNC	3,963	Amidu Sulemana	NDC	
Wa Central	Mummuni Abudu Seidu	NDC	7,643	Mummuni Abudu Seidu (Deputy Majority Leader)	NDC	
Wa East	Alhaji Issahaku Salia	NDC	8,251	Alhaji Issahaku Salia	NDC	
=== Volta Region - 19 seats ===
Constituency	Elected MP	Elected Party	Majority	Previous MP	Previous Party	
Akan	Rashid Bawa	Independent	2,920	John Kwadwo Gyapong	NDC	
Anlo	James Victor Gbeho	Independent	14,860	Clend M Kwasi Sowu	NDC	
Avenor	Edward Korbly Doe Adjaho	NDC	18,316	Edward Korbly Doe Adjaho (Majority Chief Whip)	NDC	
Biakoye	Kwabena Adjei	NDC	10,928	Kwabena Adjei (Majority Leader)	NDC	
Buem	Emil Kwadzo Brantuo	NDC	5,032	Emil Kwadzo Brantuo	NDC	
Ho Central	Kofi Attor	NDC	33,319	Kofi Attor	NDC	
Ho East	Steve Senu Akorli	NDC	19,625	Steve Senu Akorli	NDC	
Ho West	Francis Aggrey Agbotse	NDC	18,614	Francis Aggrey Agbotse	NDC	
Hohoe North	Nathaniel Kwadzo Aduadjoe	NDC	17,248	Nathaniel Kwadzo Aduadjoe	NDC	
Hohoe South	Kosi Kedem	NDC	4,263	Kosi Kedem	NDC	
Keta	Dan Kwasi Abodakpi	NDC	24,192	Dan Kwasi Abodakpi	NDC	
Ketu North	Modestus Yao Z. Ahiable	NDC	14,450	Modestus Yao Z. Ahiable	NDC	
Ketu South	Charles Kofi Agbenaza	NDC	35,683	Charles Kofi Agbenaza	NDC	
Krachi	Francis Y. Osei Sarfo	NDC	24,489	Sampson Kwadwo Apraku	NDC	
Nkwanta	Gershon Kofi Gbediame	NDC	11,765	Gershon Kofi Gbediame	NDC	
North Dayi	Akua Sena Dansua	NDC	17,787	Stephen G. Obimpeh	NDC	
North Tongu	Joe Gidisu	NDC	32,220	Austin Akufo Gamey	NDC	
South Dayi	Daniel Kwame Ampofo	NDC	7,730	Alexander R. Ababio	NDC	
South Tongu	Kenneth Dzirasah (Second Deputy Speaker)	NDC	19,914	Kenneth Dzirasah (First Deputy Speaker)	NDC	
=== Western Region - 19 seats ===
Constituency	Elected MP	Elected Party	Majority	Previous MP	Previous Party	
Ahanta West	Samuel Johnfiah	NPP	8,371	Samuel Kwofie	NPP	
Amenfi Central	John Frank Abu	NDC	3,111	John Frank Abu	NDC	
Amenfi East	Joseph Boahen Aidoo	NPP	3,776	George Buadi	NDC	
Amenfi West	Abraham Kofi Asante^{f}	NDC	1,355	Abraham Kofi Asante	NDC	
Aowin-Suaman	John Kwekuchur Ackah	NDC	4,559	John Kwekuchur Ackah	NDC	
Bia	Michael Coffie Boampong	NDC	13,088	Christian Kwabena Asante	NDC	
Bibiani	Seidu Paakuna Adamu	NDC	3,082	Seidu Paakuna Adamu	NDC	
Effia/Kwesimintsim	Joe Baidoo-Ansah	NPP	20,869	Joseph E.K. Abekah	PCP	
Ellembele	Freddie W.A. Blay (First Deputy Speaker)	CPP	4,168	Freddie W.A. Blay (Second Deputy Speaker)	CPP/PCP	
Evalue Gwira	Edith Hazel	NDC	604	Kojo Armah	PCP	
Jomoro	Joseph Emmanuel Ackah	NDC	2,256	Joseph Emmanuel Ackah	NDC	
Juabeso	Anthony K. Gyapong-Mensah	NDC	13,454	Anthony K. Gyapong-Mensah	NDC	
Mpohor-Wassa East	Samuel Kwame Amponsah	NDC	1,220	Samuel Kwame Amponsah	NDC	
Prestea-Huni-Valley	Albert Kwaku Obbin	NPP	6,891	Kweku Acheampong Bonful	NDC	
Sefwi-Wiawso	Isaac Kobina Nyame-Ofori	NDC	14,216	Isaac Kobina Nyame-Ofori	NDC	
Sekondi	Papa Owusu-Ankomah	NPP	16,773	Papa Owusu-Ankomah	NPP	
Shama	Angelina Baiden-Amissah	NPP	1,286	Richard Dornu Nartey	NDC	
Takoradi	Gladys Asmah	NPP	19,578	Gladys Asmah (Deputy Minority Leader)	NPP	
Tarkwa -Nsuaem	Gifty Eugenia Kwofie	NPP	14,897	Joseph Ghansah	PCP	

== Postponed poll ==
- ^a - Asutifi South constituency - 3 January 2001 - Due to the death of Philip Kofi Adjapong Amoah, (NPP) candidate standing for parliament, the elections in this constituency were postponed. Cecilia Djan Amoah, the (NPP) replacement candidate and also the widow of the deceased, won the seat with a majority of 550.

== By-elections ==
- ^b - Bimbilla constituency - 14 March 2002 - Dominic Aduna Bingab Nitiwul (NPP) won with a majority of 7621, after Mohamed Ibn Chambas had vacated the seat to take up his new job as the Executive Secretary of the Economic Community of West African States.
- ^c - Wulensi constituency - 4 March 2003 - Kofi Karim Wumbei (NPP), a teacher, won with a majority of 894 following the disqualification of the incumbent MP, Samuel Nyimakan of the NDC by the Supreme Court of Ghana on 15 January 2003.
- ^d - Navrongo Central constituency - 25 March 2003 - Joseph Kofi Adda (NPP) won with a majority of 7271, following the death of John Setuni Achuliwor (NPP) who died on 29 January 2003 after a road traffic accident on [5 January 2003.
- ^e - Gomoa East constituency - 8 April 2003 - Richmond Sam Quarm (NPP) won with a majority of 6,024 following the death of Emmanuel Acheampong (NPP) in a road traffic accident on February 9, 2003.
- ^f - Amenfi West constituency - 24 April 2003 - Mrs Agnes Sonful (NPP), teacher, 52, won with a majority of 4,121 due to the resignation of Abraham Kofi Asante on 26 March 2003.
- ^g - Upper Denkyira constituency - 29 June 2004 - Benjamin Kofi Ayeh (NPP) won from a field of three candidates with a majority of 20,899.

== Notes ==
- ^h - Okere constituency: The smallest winning majority in the election was just 9 votes. Brandford Kwame Daniel Adu of the NPP had 7,322 votes while Fuzzy Torbay of the NDC had 7,313 votes.
- ^i - Bantama constituency: Richard Anane of NPP won the seat by 88,649 votes to 10,679 votes for Stephen K. Boateng of the NDC. This gave him the largest majority in this election, 77,970.

== See also ==
- 2000 Ghanaian parliamentary election
- Parliament of Ghana
- Peter Ala Adjetey - Speaker of the Third Parliament
