= Ernest Attuquaye Armah =

Ghanaian politician and architect

Member of parliament for Ga South constituency
- In office 7 January 2001 – 6 January 2005
- President: John Kuffour
- Preceded by: Margaret Clarke Kwesie
- Succeeded by: Constituency dissolved

MP for Trobu-Amasaman
- In office 7 January 2009 – 6 January 2013
- President: John Evans Atta Mills
- Preceded by: Samuel Nii-Aryeetey Attoh
- Succeeded by: Constituency divided

Personal details
- Born: 27 August 1957 (age 69)
- Party: National Democratic Congress
- Children: 4
- Education: Kiev Civil Engineering Institute in Ukraine
- Occupation: Politician
- Profession: Architect

Ernest Attuquaye Armah (born 27 August 1957) is a Development Planner, Architect and Quantity Surveyor. He was also a politician and a former member of parliament for the Trobu-Amasaman constituency in the Greater Accra region of Ghana.

== Early life and education ==
Armah was born in 1957 and comes from Afuaman (Manhean Electoral Area) in the Greater Accra Region of Ghana. He obtained a Master of Science degree in Architecture from the Kiev Civil Engineering Institute in Ukraine in 1988.

== Personal life and career ==
Armah is a Christian who worships with the Church of Pentecost. He is married with four children. He works as a Chief Engineer at the Ga District Assembly.

== Politics ==
Armah was elected as the member of parliament for the Ga South constituency in the 3rd parliament of the 4th republic in the 2000 Ghanaian general elections. He was elected on the ticket of the National Democratic Congress. His constituency was a part of the 6 parliamentary seats out of 22 seats won by the National Democratic Congress in that election for the Greater Accra Region.

The National Democratic Congress won a minority total of 92 parliamentary seats out of 200 seats in the 3rd parliament of the 4th republic of Ghana. He was elected with 41,745 votes out of 78,849 total valid votes cast. This was equivalent to 53.8% of the total valid votes cast.

He was elected over Samuel Nii-Aryeetey Attoh of the New Patriotic Party, Thelma Lantwei Lamptey of the Convention People's Party, Abraham Lartey Joe of the National Reform Party, Daniel Addoquaye Pappoe of the People's National Convention and Edward Osei Bonsu of the United Ghana Movement. These obtained 30,425, 2,510, 1,556, 1,035 and 335 votes respectively out of the total valid votes cast. These were equivalent to 39.2%, 3.2%, 2.0%, 1.3 and 0.4% respectively of total valid votes cast.

However, during the 2004 elections, after the Ga South constituency was dissolved, Armah represented the National Democratic Congress in the Amasaman constituency but lost to Samuel Nii-Aryeetey Attoh.

In 2008, he became a member of the Fifth Parliament of the Fourth Republic of Ghana. He won the Trobu-Amasaman constituency in 2008 on the ticket of the National Democratic Congress. He won the seat with a total number of 34,797 votes out of the 71,093 valid votes cast, getting 48.9% out of 100%. In the 2012 elections, his constituency was divide into two, now the Trobu constituency and the Amasaman constituency. However, he did not win any seat in these two constituencies.
