= Anthony K. Gyapong-Mensah =

Ghanaian politician

Hon. Anthony K. Gyapong Mensah
- Preceded by: Kingsley Asoah-Apima
- Succeeded by: Sampson Ahi

Member of Parliament for Juabeso Constituency
- In office 7 January 2001 – 6 January 2005
- President: John Kufuor

Personal details
- Party: National Democratic Congress

Anthony K. Gyapong-Mensah is a Ghanaian politician and a member of the 2nd and 3rd parliament of the 4th republic of Ghana. He is a former member of Parliament for the Juabeso constituency in the Western Region a member of the National Democratic Congress political party in Ghana.

== Politics ==
Gyapong-Mensah was a member of the 2nd and 3rd parliament of the 4th republic of Ghana. He was first elected during the 1996 Ghanaian general election with 38,539 votes out of the 46,427 votes cast representing 61.50% over Aborampah Aseidu-Mensah an NPP member who polled 7,888 votes and Ayuba Tank a PNC member who polled 0 Votes.

Kingsley Asoah-Apima was his predecessor and Sampson Ahi his successor. He is a member of the National Democratic Congress and a representative of the Juabeso constituency of the Western Region of Ghana. His political career began when he contested in the 2000 Ghanaian General elections and won on the ticket of the National Democratic Congress.

=== 2000 Elections ===
Gyapong-Mensah was elected as the member of parliament for the Juabeso constituency in the 2000 Ghanaian general elections. He won the elections on the ticket of the National Democratic Congress. His constituency was a part of the 9 parliamentary seats out of 19 seats won by the National Democratic Congress in that election for the Western Region. The National Democratic Congress won a minority total of 92 parliamentary seats out of 200 seats in the 3rd parliament of the 4th republic of Ghana. He was elected with 23,945 votes out of 37,901 total valid votes cast. This was equivalent to 63.6% of the total valid votes cast.

He was elected over Christopher Sakpaku of the New Patriotic Party, Andoh Tandoh Michael of the National Reformed Party, Samuel Alex A. Larbi of the Convention People's Party, Sharif Abubakar Nkrumah of the People's National Convention and Minnah Kenndey of the United Ghana Movement. These obtained 10,491, 1,745, 793, 511 and 172 votes respectively out of the total valid votes cast. These were equivalent to 27.9%, 4.6%, 2.1%, 1.4% and 0.5% respectively of total valid votes cast.

== See also ==
- List of MPs elected in the 2000 Ghanaian parliamentary election
