= Samuel Kwame Amponsah =

Ghanaian politician

Hon. Samuel Kwame Amponsah

Member of Parliament for Mpohor-Wassa East Constituency
- In office 7 January 2001 – 6 January 2005
- President: John Kufuor

Personal details
- Party: National Democratic Congress
- Education: Kwame Nkrumah University of Science and Technology
- Occupation: Soldier / Politician

Samuel Kwame Amponsah is a Ghanaian politician, farmer and a member of the 3rd parliament of the 4th republic of Ghana. He is a former member of Parliament for the Mpohor-Wassa East constituency in the Western Region a member of the National Democratic Congress political party in Ghana.

== Early life and education ==
Amponsah hails from the Western Region of Ghana. He studied Mathematics and had his PhD at the Kwame Nkrumah University of Science and Technology.

== Career ==
Amponsah is a soldier by profession.

== Politics ==
Amponsah was a member of the 2nd and 3rd parliament of the 4th republic of Ghana. He is a member of the National Democratic Congress and a representative of the Mpohor-Wassa East constituency of the Western Region of Ghana. His political career began when he contested in the 2000 Ghanaian General elections and won on the ticket of the National Democratic Congress. During the 1996 Ghanaian General Elections, he polled 20,352 votes out of the 38,121 valid votes cast representing 40.70% over his opponents Mary Stella Ankomah, Paul King Arthur and Alex Bessah Dogbeh who polled 15,288 votes, 1,612 votes and 909 votes respectively.

=== 2000 Elections ===
Amponsah was elected as the member of parliament for the Mpohor-Wassa East constituency in the 2000 Ghanaian general elections. He won the elections on the ticket of the National Democratic Congress. His constituency was a part of the 9 parliamentary seats out of 19 seats won by the National Democratic Congress in that election for the Western Region. The National Democratic Congress won a minority total of 92 parliamentary seats out of 200 seats in the 3rd parliament of the 4th republic of Ghana. He was elected with 11,674 votes out of 31,515 total valid votes cast. This was equivalent to 33.4% of the total valid votes cast. He was elected over Patrick Somiah Ehomah an independent candidate, Peter Nwanwaan of the New Patriotic Party, Abraham Yankson of the Convention People's Party, Stephen Blay of the National Reformed Party, Richard Aduko Raqib of the People's National Convention and Patrick Tandoh Williams of the United Ghana Movement. These obtained 10,454, 6,869, 1,263 and 300 votes respectively out of the total valid votes cast. These were equivalent to 34.2%, 22.5%, 4.1% and 1.0% respectively of total valid votes cast.

== See also ==
- List of MPs elected in the 2000 Ghanaian parliamentary election
