= Charles Omar Nyanor =

Ghanaian politician (1935–2004)

Hon. Charles Omar Nyanor

Deputy Minister of Finance
- In office 1969–1972
- Prime Minister: Dr. K.A. Busia

Member of Parliament for Upper Denkyira East Constituency
- In office 7 January 2001 – 6 January 2005
- President: John Kufuor

Personal details
- Born: 1 September 1935
- Died: 30 April 2004 (aged 68)
- Party: New Patriotic Party
- Education: University College of London, Institute of Bankers
- Occupation: Economist, political scientist, banker, industrialist
- Profession: lawyer

Charles Omar Nyanor (1 September 1935 – 30 April 2004) was a Ghanaian economist, political scientist, banker, lawyer, industrialist and politician who represented the Upper Denkyira constituency. He was a member of the 1st Parliament of the 2nd Republic of Ghana.

== Early life and education ==
Charles Omar Nyanor was born on 1 September 1935. He was from Dunkwa-on-Offin. He attended University College, London and Lincoln's Inn, London, where he attained a Bachelor of Science degree in economics in 1964. He also became an Associate of the Institute of Bankers (AIB), London in 1965. He became a Barrister-at-Law in 1966.

== Politics ==
Nyanor returned to Ghana in 1967, and worked as the Senior Project Officer in the Project Appraisal and Implementation and legal work associated with project implementation at the National Investment Bank. C.O. as affectionately called by his colleagues served as the deputy minister, Ministry of Finance and Economic Planning under the government of Dr. K.A. Busia from 1969 to 1972 (Progress Party). In the ministry of finance he was instrumental in the establishment of the Merchant Bank, the small business promotion scheme and the bank for housing and construction.

He was later elected into the Parliament of Ghana in 1996, as a member of the New Patriotic Party. Nyanor also served as minister of private sector development under President J.A. Kuffour and subsequently as minister of state in charge of Divestiture implementation committee.

During his lifetime, the late uncle, Nana Kwaku Ofori II, Dunkwahene, proposed C.O. Nyanor to succeed him after his reign. But his love for politics will not permit him. He offered the excuse as one of the main reasons why he refused acceding to the Dunkwa-hene throne.

He was also a member of the Third Parliament of the Fourth Republic of Ghana. He was elected during the 2000 Ghanaian General Elections where he polled 25,994 of votes cast which represents 63.90 of the total votes cast over his opponents; Kwaku Oduro-Bonsu of the National Democratic Congress who polled 13,335 votes representing 32.80% of the total votes cast, Beatrice Buadu of the Convention Peoples Party who obtained 891 votes representing 2.20% of the total votes cast, Apeko-Kow Anderson of the National Reform Party who also polled 289 representing 0.70% of the total votes cast and Kwasi Antoban Joseph of the United Ghana Movement polling 167 votes which represent 0.40% of the total votes cast for the Upper Denkyira constituency.

== Outside parliament ==
Nyanor worked as the Senior Investment development officer of the National Investment Bank, Accra. Private Legal Practitioner, chairman of the board of directors SPPC, Bibiani Metal Works (Shareholder and active partner), Kowus Motors, State Owned Institutions and other Privately held companies

== Personal life and death ==
Nyanor was a devout Methodist, and was married with children. He died after a short illness on 30 April 2004, at the age of 68.

== Sources ==
- Nyanor to be buried on June 26
- Ghana: Vacant Seat in Parliament
- MPs mourn Nyanor
- Government's policy on works and housing lacks focus
