= Hayford Francis Amoako =

Ghanaian politician

Hon. Hayford Francis Amoako

Member of Parliament for Nkoranza Constituency
- In office 7 January 2001 – 6 January 2005
- President: John Kufuor

Personal details
- Party: National Democratic Congress
- Profession: Politician

Hayford Francis Amoako is a Ghanaian politician and was a member of parliament for the Nkoranza constituency in the Brong Ahafo region of Ghana. He was a member of parliament in the 3rd parliament of the 4th republic of Ghana.

== Politics ==
Amoako is a member of the National Democratic Congress. He was elected as the member of parliament for the Nkoranza constituency in the Brong Ahafo region in the 3rd parliament of the 4th republic of Ghana. He was succeeded by Kwame Ampofo Twumasi after the constituency was changed to Nkoranza South constituency in the 2004 Ghanaian General elections. He was appointed as the Interim General Secretary of the National Democratic Party.

He was appointed as an interim secretary for the National Democratic Party in the year 2012 following the resignation of Dr. Joseph Mamboah-Rockson, hence, now making Him (Amoako) the party's general secretary.

== 2000 Elections ==
Amoako was elected as the member of parliament for the Nkoranza constituency in the 2000 Ghanaian general elections. He was elected on the ticket of the National Democratic Congress. His constituency was a part of the 7 parliamentary seats out of 21 seats won by the National Democratic Congress in that election for the Brong Ahafo Region. The National Democratic Congress won a minority total of 92 parliamentary seats out of 200 seats in the 3rd parliament of the 4th republic of Ghana. He was elected with 20,828 votes out of 43,098 total valid votes cast. This was equivalent to 46.2% of the total valid votes cast. He was elected over Kwame Amporfo Twumasi of the New Patriotic Party, Justice Owoahene Acheampong of the People's National Convention, Kwaku Poku-Boah of the Convention People's Party, James Opoku-Worae of the National Reform Party, Owusu Benjamin of the United Ghana Movement and Thomas Owusu-Ansah of the Every Ghanaian Everywhere party. These obtained 19,384, 735, 533, 383 and 111 and 0votes respectively out of the total valid votes cast. These were equivalent to 46.2%, 1.8%, 1.3%, 0.9%, 0.3% and 0% respectively of total valid votes cast.
