= Harry Halifax-Hayford =

Ghanaian politician and lawyer

Hon. Harry Halifax Hayford

Member of Parliament for Abura-Asebu-Kwamankese Constituency
- In office 7 January 2001 – 6 January 2005
- President: John Kufuor
- Succeeded by: Augustine Solomon Ekye

Personal details
- Party: National Democratic Congress
- Occupation: politician
- Profession: lawyer

Harry Halifax Hayford is Ghanaian politician and a lawyer. He was a member of the 3rd parliament of the 4th republic of Ghana and a member of parliament for the Abura- Asebu-Kwamankese constituency of the Central Region of Ghana.

== Early life and career ==
Hayford, who hails from the Central Region of Ghana is a Lawyer by profession. He became a politician and in the year 2000, he contested for the member of parliament seat in the Abura- Asebu-Kwamankese constituency of the Central Region of Ghana where he stood for the position during the 2000 Ghanaian general elections won.

== Politics ==
Hayford is a politician and a member of the National Democratic Congress. He became a member of the third parliament of the fourth republic of Ghana on the ticket of the National Democratic Congress where he was a representative of the Asebu-Kwamankese constituency of the Central Region of Ghana. His political career began when he contested in the 2000 Ghanaian general elections and won a seat for the National Democratic Congress with a total vote of 13,661 representing 44.90% of the total votes cast over his opponents Andrew Kingsford Mensah of the New Patriotic Party, Raymond Nonnatus Osei of the Convention People's Party who polled 2,570% which represent 8.40% of the total votes, Joshua Alfred Amuah of the National Reform Party who had 1,093 representing 3.60% of the total votes cast, Ametorwo Richard Korbla of the People's National Convention who also polled 321 votes representing 1.10% of the total votes cast and Yeboah Peter of the United Ghana Movement polling 263 representing 0.90% of the total votes cast. His term in office ended in 2004 when he lost to Augustine Solomon Ekye during the delegate election of the region.
