= John Kwekuchur Ackah =

Ghanaian politician

Hon. John Kwekuchur Ackah

Member of Parliament for Aowin Suaman Constituency
- In office 7 January 1997 – 6 January 2005
- Preceded by: Arthur Sibieko Bullu
- Succeeded by: Constituency divided

Personal details
- Party: National Democratic Congress
- Occupation: Politician

John Kwekuchur Ackah is a Ghanaian politician and a member of the 2nd and 3rd parliament of the 4th republic of Ghana. He is a former member of Parliament for the Aowin Suaman constituency in the Western Region a member of the National Democratic Congress political party in Ghana.

== Politics ==
Ackah was a member of the 3rd parliament of the 4th republic of Ghana. He is a member of the National Democratic Congress and a representative of the Aowin Suaman constituency of the Western Region of Ghana. His political career began when he contested in the 1996 Ghanaian General elections and won on the ticket of the National Democratic Congress. In the 2000 General Election, he contested again and won for the second term. In the 2004 elections, the Aowin Suaman constituency was divided into two forming the Aowin and Suaman constituencies respectively. Ackah contested for the Aowin seat on the ticket of the National Democratic Congress but lost to Samuel Adu Gyamfi of the New Patriotic Party.

=== 1996 Elections ===
Ackah contested as MP to represent Aowin Suaman Constituency in the 1996 Ghanaian general elections with the ticket of the National Democratic Congress. Other contestants were Kingsley Ofori Asante of the NPP, S.B.Ing Arthur of the NCP and Frank Ernest Prah of the IND. Ackah was declared winner after acquiring the highest vote count of 29,092 votes which equals 45.20% of the total votes

=== 2000 Elections ===
Ackah was elected as the member of parliament for the Aowin Suaman constituency in the 2000 Ghanaian general elections. He won the elections on the ticket of the National Democratic Congress. His constituency was a part of the 9 parliamentary seats out of 19 seats won by the National Democratic Congress in that election for the Western Region. The National Democratic Congress won a minority total of 92 parliamentary seats out of 200 seats in the 3rd parliament of the 4th republic of Ghana. He was elected with 17,430 votes out of 36,579 total valid votes cast. This was equivalent to 49.4% of the total valid votes cast. He was elected over Alfred Ackaah Essuman of the New Patriotic Party, Pauliv Assuah of the Convention People's Party, Peter Beng of the People's National Convention, Yaw Boakye of the United Ghana Movement. These obtained 12,871, 4,072, 591 and 349 votes respectively out of the total valid votes cast. These were equivalent to 36.4%, 11.5%, 1.7% and 1% respectively of total valid votes cast.

== See also ==
- List of MPs elected in the 2000 Ghanaian parliamentary election
- List of MPs elected in the 1996 Ghanaian parliamentary election
