= Nana Odame Kusi =

Ghanaian politician

MP for Fomena
- In office 7 January 1993 – 6 January 1997
- President: Jerry John Rawlings
- Preceded by: New
- Succeeded by: Akwasi Afrifa

Personal details
- Born: 11 June 1943 (age 83) Fomena, Ashanti Region Gold Coast (now Ghana)
- Party: National Democratic Congress
- Education: Takoradi Technical Institute
- Alma mater: George Grant University of Mines and Technology; School of Electrical and Mechanical Engineering
- Occupation: Politician
- Profession: Auctioneer, farmer

Nana Odame Kusi (born 11 June 1943) is a Ghanaian politician and a member of the first parliament of the fourth Republic representing the Fomena constituency in the Ashanti Region of Ghana. He was a member of the National Democratic Congress.

== Early life and education ==
Kusi was born on 11 June 1943 in the Ashanti Region of Ghana. He attended the Takoradi Technical Institute, where he received his GCE Ordinary Level Certificate, the Tarkwa School of Mines (now the George Grant University of Mines and Technology), where he obtained his Diploma in Electrical engineering, and the School of Electrical and Mechanical Engineering (now the Defence School of Electronic and Mechanical Engineering), where he qualified as a Practice Artificer equivalent to a Higher National Certificate.

== Politics ==
He was elected into parliament on the ticket of the National Democratic Congress for the Fomena Constituency in the Ashanti Region of Ghana during the 1992 Ghanaian parliamentary election. He polled 3,678 votes out of the total valid votes cast. He was succeeded by Akwasi Afrifa of the New Patriotic Party during the 1996 Ghanaian general elections.

== Career ==
He is an auctioneer and a farmer by profession and a former member of parliament for the Fomena Constituency in the Ashanti Region of Ghana.

== Personal life ==
He is a Christian.
