= Ajumako-Enyan-Essiam (Ghana parliament constituency) =

Constituency in the Central Region of Ghana

- constituency for the Parliament of Ghana
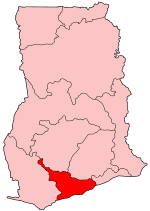
- District: Ajumako/Enyan/Essiam District
- Region: Central Region of Ghana

Current constituency
- Party: National Democratic Congress
- MP: Cassiel Ato Forson

Ajumako-Enyan-Essiam is one of the constituencies represented in the Parliament of Ghana. It elects one Member of Parliament (MP) by the first past the post system of election. Ajumako-Enyam-Essiam is located in the Ajumako/Enyan/Essiam district of the Central Region of Ghana.

== Boundaries ==
The seat is located entirely within the Ajumako/Enyan/Essiam district of the Central Region of Ghana.

== Members of Parliament ==
Election	Member	Party
1992	Joseph Kweku Enos	National Democratic Congress
1996	Isaac Edousar Edumadze	New Patriotic Party
2008	Cassiel Ato Forson	National Democratic Congress

== Elections ==
2008 Ghanaian parliamentary election: Ajumako-Enyan-Essiam Source:Electoral Commission of Ghana
Party	Candidate	Votes	%	±%
National Democratic Congress	Cassiel Ato Forson	18,593	51.7	12.9
New Patriotic Party	William Kow Arthur-Baiden	15,668	43.5	−14.3
Independent	Alex Arthur	1,040	2.9	2.9
Convention People's Party	Rexford Mensah	479	1.3	−2.1
Democratic Freedom Party	Evans Addo-Nkum	213	0.6	—
Majority		6,554	18.5	7.9
Turnout		36,855	71.2	−11.6

2004 Ghanaian parliamentary election: Ajumako-Enyan-Essiam Source:Electoral Commission of Ghana
Party	Candidate	Votes	%	±%
New Patriotic Party	Isaac Eduosar Edumadze	21,534	57.8	7.5
National Democratic Congress	Samuel Aggrey Forson	14,474	38.8	−2.8
Convention People's Party	Kwame Asoandze Edu-Ansah	1,276	3.4	1.0
Independent	James Appiah-Mensah	0.0	0.0	—
Majority		7,060	19.0	10.3
Turnout		37,284	82.8	—

2000 Ghanaian parliamentary election: Ajumako-Enyan-Essiam Source:Adam Carr's Election Archives
Party	Candidate	Votes	%	±%
New Patriotic Party	Isaac Eduosar Edumadze	15,336	50.3	5.5
National Democratic Congress	Mary Padmore Dadzie	12,681	41.6	−0.8
National Reform Party	Kwame Adomako-Mensah	1,314	4.3	—
Convention People's Party	Jonathan Suliman Otabil	747	2.4	—
United Ghana Movement	Kojo Banafo	115	0.4	—
People's National Convention	Robert Anthony Gyaisie	30	0.1	−2.1
Majority		2,655	8.7	6.3
Turnout		—	—	—

1996 Ghanaian parliamentary election: Ajumako-Enyan-Essiam Source:Electoral Commission of Ghana
Party	Candidate	Votes	%	±%
New Patriotic Party	Isaac Edousar Edumadze	15,660	44.8	—
National Democratic Congress	Joseph Kweku Enos	14,839	42.4	—
People's Convention Party	Lawrence Yaw Awuah	3,672	10.5	—
People's National Convention	Joseph Mensah	782	2.2	—
Majority		821	2.4	—
Turnout		35,792	73.3	40.9

1992 Ghanaian parliamentary election: Ajumako-Enyan-Essiam Source:Electoral Commission of Ghana
Party	Candidate	Votes	%	±%
National Democratic Congress	Joseph Kweku Enos	—	—	—
Majority		—	—	—
Turnout		15,733	32.4	—

== See also ==
- List of Ghana Parliament constituencies
- Ajumako/Enyan/Essiam District
