= Joseph Emmanuel Ackah =

Ghanaian politician (1934–2024)

Hon. Joseph Emmanuel Ackah

Member of Parliament for Jomoro Constituency
- In office 7 January 1993 – 6 January 1997
- Preceded by: James V. Leuven Mensah
- In office 7 January 1997 – 6 January 2001

Member of Parliament for Jomoro Constituency
- In office 7 January 2001 – 6 January 2005
- President: John Kufuor
- Succeeded by: Lee Ocran

Personal details
- Born: 31 August 1934
- Died: 17 April 2024 (aged 89)
- Party: National Democratic Congress
- Education: University of Ghana, University of Cape Coast
- Occupation: Politician
- Profession: Farmer

Joseph Emmanuel Ackah (31 August 1934 – 17 April 2024) was a Ghanaian politician, farmer and a member of the 1st, 2nd and 3rd parliament of the 4th republic of Ghana. He was a member of Parliament for the Jomoro constituency in the Western Region a member of the National Democratic Congress political party in Ghana.

== Early life and education ==
Ackah was born on 31 August 1934. He was a product of the University of Ghana. He acquired a Bachelor of Arts degree in history from the university. Ackah was also a product of University of Cape Coast. He acquired a Post-graduate Certificate in Education from the university. Ackah was a farmer by profession.

== Politics ==
Ackah was first elected during the 1992 Ghanaian parliamentary election as member of the 1st parliament of the 4th republic. He succeeded James V. Leuven Mensah of the People's National Party (PNP). He was also a member of the 2nd and 3rd parliament of the 4th republic of Ghana. He was a member of the National Democratic Congress and a representative of the Jomoro constituency of the Western Region of Ghana. His political career began when he contested in the 1992 and won on the ticket of the National Democratic Congress. After the term ended, he contested again in the 1996 Ghanaian general elections and in 2000 Ghanaian general election.

1996 Elections

Ackah contested in the 1996 Ghanaian General Elections with the ticket of the National Democratic Congress to be voted as member of Parliament to represent Jomoro Constituency and won the contest with 22,881 votes. Other contestants for the office were Anthony Kwofie Jabialu of the Convention Peoples Party who had 13,401 votes and Patrick Tandoh Williams of the National Convention Party who had 1,394 of the total valid votes.

=== 2000 Elections ===
Ackah was elected as the member of parliament for the Jomoro constituency in the 2000 Ghanaian general elections. He won the elections on the ticket of the National Democratic Congress. His constituency was a part of the 9 parliamentary seats out of 19 seats won by the National Democratic Congress in that election for the Western Region. The National Democratic Congress won a minority total of 92 parliamentary seats out of 200 seats in the 3rd parliament of the 4th republic of Ghana. He was elected with 10,427 votes out of 32,232 total valid votes cast. This was equivalent to 33.4% of the total valid votes cast. He was elected over Patrick Somiah Ehomah an independent candidate, Peter Nwanwaan of the New Patriotic Party, Abraham Yankson of the Convention People's Party, Stephen Blay of the National Reformed Party, Richard Aduko Raqib of the People's National Convention and Patrick Tandoh Williams of the United Ghana Movement. These obtained 8,171, 5,959, 4,762, 1,365, 389 and 131 votes respectively out of the total valid votes cast. These were equivalent to 26.2%, 19.1%, 15.3%, 4.4%, 1.2% and 0.4% respectively of total valid votes cast.

== Personal life and death ==
Ackah was a Christian. He died on 17 April 2024, at the age of 89.

== See also ==
- List of MPs elected in the 2000 Ghanaian parliamentary election
- List of MPs elected in the 1996 Ghanaian parliamentary election
