= Mary Stella Ankomah =

Ghanaian politician

MP for Mpohor-Wassa East
- In office 7 January 1993 – 6 January 1997
- President: Jerry John Rawlings

Personal details
- Born: 19 November 1957 (age 68) Mpohor-Wassa East (Ghana parliament constituency), Western Region Gold Coast (now Ghana)
- Party: Convention People's Party
- Occupation: Politician
- Profession: Teacher

Mary Stella Ankomah (born 19 November 1957) is a Ghanaian politician and a member of the first Parliament of the fourth Republic representing the Mpohor-Wassa East constituency in the Western Region of Ghana. She represented the Convention People's Party.

== Early life and education ==
Mary Stella Ankomah was born on 19 November 1957 at Mpohor-Wassa East in the Western region of Ghana. She obtained her Diploma in Social Studies, Education.

== Politics ==
Mary Stella Ankomah was first elected into Parliament on the ticket of the Convention People's Party for the Mpohor-Wassa East Constituency in the Western Region of Ghana during the 1992 Ghanaian general elections. She was defeated by Samuel Kwame Amponsah of the National Democratic Congress during the 1996 General Elections who polled 20,352 votes out of the 100% valid votes cast representing 40.70% whilst she had 15,248 votes representing 30.50%, Paul King Arthur who polled 1,612 votes representing 3.20%, Alex Bessah Dogbeh who polled 909 votes representing 1.80% and Samuel Branord Effah of the New Patriotic Party who polled 0 vote representing 0.00%.

== Career ==
Mary Stella Ankomah is a teacher by profession and a former member of Parliament for the Mpohor-Wassa East Constituency in the Western Region of Ghana.

== Personal life ==
Mary Stella Ankomah is a Christian.
