= Dwamena Bekoe =

Ghanaian politician

Hon. Dwamena Bekoe

Member of parliament for Asuogyaman constituency
- In office 07 January 2001 – 06 January 2005
- Preceded by: Kwamena Dwamena-Aboagye
- Succeeded by: Kofi Osei-Ameyaw

Personal details
- Party: National Democratic Congress
- Occupation: Politician

Dwamena Bekoe is a Ghanaian politician. He served as a member of parliament for the Asuogyaman constituency in the Eastern Region of Ghana.

== Early life, education and politics ==
Bekoe is a member of the 3rd parliament of the 4th republic of Ghana elected during the 2000 Ghanaian general election on the ticket of the National Democratic Congress with 14,905 votes. He lost in 2004 to Kofi Osei-Ameyaw of the New Patriotic Party.,

== Career ==
Mr. Bekoe is the chief executive officer of Dwabeks Enterprise Limited.

== Elections ==
Bekoe is a member of the 3rd parliament of the 4th republic of Ghana. His political career begun in the 2000 Ghanaian general elections when he contested as a member of parliament for the Asuogyaman constituency of the eastern region and won on the ticket of the national democratic congress by 52.90% which is equivalent to 14,905 of the total votes cast. The other competitors from various parties include; Dr. Godfried Kofi-Siaw of the New Patriotic Party, Joseph Emmanuel Addi of the National Reform Party, and David Dosoo of the People's National Convention. They obtained 12,579, 426, 253 votes respectively. These are equivalent to 44.70%, 1.50% and 0.90% of the total votes. The Functional Executive Committee (FEC) of the National Democratic Congress endorsed Mr. Dwamena Bekoe as the party's parliamentary candidate for the Asuogyaman constituency in the 2004 elections and he contested again but lost to Kofi Osei-Ameyaw of the New Patriotic party.
