= Stephen Kwaku Balado Manu =

Ghanaian politician (born 1958)

Hon. Stephen Kwaku Balado Manu

Member of Parliament for Ahafo Ano South Constituency
- In office 7 January 1997 – 6 January 2001
- President: Jerry John Rawlings

Member of Parliament for Ahafo Ano South Constituency
- In office 7 January 2009 – 6 January 2013
- President: John Atta Mills; John Mahama

Member of Parliament for Ahafo Ano South Constituency
- In office 7 January 2005 – 6 January 2009
- President: John Kufuor

Member of Parliament for Ahafo Ano South Constituency
- In office 7 January 2001 – 6 January 2005
- President: John Kufuor

Personal details
- Born: 23 August 1958 (age 68)
- Party: New Patriotic Party
- Children: Six
- Education: University of Cape Coast, Ghana Institute of Management and Public Administration
- Profession: Teacher

Stephen Kwaku Balado Manu (born 23 August 1958) is a teacher and Ghanaian politician of the Republic of Ghana. He was the Member of Parliament representing Ahafo Ano South constituency of the Ashanti Region of Ghana in the 2nd, 3rd, 4th and 5th Parliament of the 4th Republic of Ghana. He is a member of the New Patriotic Party.

== Early life and education ==
Stephen was born on 23 August 1958. He hails from Tatale, a town in the Northern Region of Ghana. He is a product of the University of Cape Coast. He holds a Bachelor of Arts degree in French and Sociology from the university. He acquired the degree in 1988. He furthered his studies at the same university in Education Planning and Administration. He acquired a Mphil. He later acquired an Executive Master of Governance and Leadership certificate from the Ghana Institute of Management and Public Administration in 2006.

== Career ==
Stephen was the assistant director of the Ghana education service.

== Political career ==
Stephen is a member of the New Patriotic Party. He became a member of parliament for the Ahafo Ano South Constituency from January 2005 after emerging winner in the General election in December 2004. He later run for the second time and won as the Member of Parliament for the same constituency in 2008.

== Elections ==
Stephen was first elected as Member of the parliament to represent Ahafo Ano South Constituency in the 1996 Ghanaian General elections where he contested and won with the ticket of the New Patriotic Party. He won the election with 17,015 vote count out of 33,464 valid votes cast at the constituency while his main opponent, Gabriel Barima of the National Democratic Congress had 16,449 votes.

In the year 2000, Manu won the general elections as the member of parliament for the Ahafo-Ano South constituency of the Ashanti Region of Ghana. He won on the ticket of the New Patriotic Party. His constituency was a part of the 31 parliamentary seats out of 33 seats won by the New Patriotic Party in that election for the Ashanti Region. The New Patriotic Party won a majority total of 99 parliamentary seats out of 200 seats. He was elected with 19,017 votes out of 33,599 total valid votes cast. This was equivalent to 56.6% of the total valid votes cast. He was elected over Osei Kuffour of the National Democratic Congress, Samuel K. Boateng of the Convention People's Party, Bernard K. Bekoe of the New Reformed Party and Ampratwu-Konadu of United Ghana Movement. These won 14,054, 209, 188 and 131 votes out of the total valid votes cast respectively. These were equivalent to 41.8%, 0.6%, 0.6% and 0.4% respectively of total valid votes cast.

Stephen was elected as the member of parliament for the Ahafo Ano South constituency of the Ashanti Region of Ghana for the second time in the 2004 Ghanaian general elections. He won on the ticket of the New Patriotic Party. His constituency was a part of the 36 parliamentary seats out of 39 seats won by the New Patriotic Party in that election for the Ashanti Region. The New Patriotic Party won a majority total of 128 parliamentary seats out of 230 seats. He was elected with 24,096 votes out of 37,273 total valid votes cast equivalent to 64.6% of total valid votes cast. He was elected over Bright Simon Osei of the National Democratic Congress. He obtained 35.4% of total valid votes cast.

In 2008, he won the general elections on the ticket of the New Patriotic Party for the same constituency. His constituency was part of the 34 parliamentary seats out of 39 seats won by the New Patriotic Party in that election for the Ashanti Region. The New Patriotic Party won a minority total of 109 parliamentary seats out of 230 seats. He was elected with 21,585 votes out of 37,936 total valid votes cast equivalent to 56.9% of total valid votes cast. He was elected over Nyamesem Wilson of the People's National Convention, Thomas Kwakwah of the National Democratic Congress, Acheampong J. Martin of the Convention People's Party, Yaw Agyemang and Andrew Kwasi Adjapong both independent candidates. These obtained 0.91%, 39.56%, 0.86%, 0.62% and 1.14% respectively of the total votes cast.

== Personal life ==
Stephen is a Catholic Christian. He is married with six children.

== See also ==
- List of MPs elected in the 2000 Ghanaian parliamentary election
- List of MPs elected in the 2004 Ghanaian parliamentary election
- List of MPs elected in the 2008 Ghanaian parliamentary election
