= Abraham Owusu Baidoo =

Ghanaian politician (born 1959)

MP for Twifo-Hemang-Lower-Denkyira
- In office 7 January 2000 – 6 January 2005
- President: John Kufour

Personal details
- Born: 17 April 1959 (age 67) Lower Denkyira, Central Region
- Party: National Democratic Congress
- Occupation: Politician

Abraham Owusu Baidoo is a Ghanaian politician who was a member of the Third Parliament of the Fourth Republic of Ghana representing the Twifo/Hemang/Lower/Denkyira constituency in the Central Region of Ghana.

== Early life and education ==
Owusu was born in Lower Denkira in the Central Region of Ghana.

== Politics ==
Baidoo became a member of the 3rd parliament of the 4th republic of Ghana during 2000 Ghanaian General Elections for the Twifo/Hemang/Lower/Denkyira constituency in the Central Region of Ghana on the ticket of the National Democratic Congress. During the 2000 Ghanaian general elections, he polled a total vote of 17,319 representing 49.20% of the total votes cast over his opponents Abraham Dwuma Odoom of the New Patriotic Party who had 15,682 votes cast representing 44.60%, Elizabeth Bimpong of the Convention Peoples Party who had 1,705 votes representing 4.80% of the total votes cast and Jonathan R. Adofo of the National Reform Party who also had a total vote of 488 which represent 1.40% of the total votes cast

== Career ==
Baidoo was a former member of the third Parliament of the fourth Republic of Ghana (from 2001 to 2005) during the 2000 Ghanaian general elections for the Twifo/Hemang/Lower/Denkyira constituency.
