= Gabriel Barima =

Farmer, politician, chief executive and former member of parliament

Hon. Gabriel Barima

Member of Parliament for Ahafo Ano South
- In office 7 January 1993 – 6 January 1997
- President: John Jerry Rawlings
- Preceded by: Constituency merged
- Succeeded by: Stephen Kwaku Balado Manu

Member of Parliament for Ahafo Ano South

Personal details
- Party: New Patriotic Party
- Occupation: Politician
- Profession: Farmer

Gabriel Barima (popularly known as "Tweaa DCE") is a Ghanaian politician and the former District Chief Executive of the Ahafo Ano South District in the Ashanti Region of Ghana. He is well known for making popular the Akan word "Tweaa", which has subsequently become slang. The "Tweaa" was said at the function which took place at Mankranso Hospital.

== Early life and education ==
Barima was born on March 12, 1953, at Biemso 1 in the Ashanti Region of Ghana. He attended the Opoku Ware School where he studied Agricultural.

== Politics ==
Barima was elected into the 1st parliament of the 4th Republic of Ghana on 7 January after he emerged as winner at the 1992 Ghanaian parliamentary election held on 29 December 1992 under the membership of the National Democratic Congress.

He stood once again for the Ahafo Ano South seat on the ticket of the National Democratic Congress but lost to Stephen K. Balado Manu. He polled 16,449 votes representing 40.5% of the total valid votes cast. Balado Manu on the hand polled 17,015 votes representing 41.90% of the total valid votes cast to win the seat for the New Patriotic Party.

== Career ==
Barima is a former member of parliament for the Ahafo Ano South Constituency in the Ashanti Region of Ghana. He is also a farmer by profession.

== Personal life ==
Barima is a Christian.

== Meaning of Tweaa ==
Tweaa, an Akan interjection used to express disapproval or contempt for a statement.

=== The Context of the "Tweaa" Comment ===
Barima was captured on video expressing anger at the audience, after an unknown individual allegedly said "Tweaa" during his speech, at an end-of-year event at the district directorate. The video went viral on social media leading to coverage by traditional media.

Quote from the video:

"Who made that 'tweaa' sound? Am I your size?...I have been given the platform to talk. You were not given the platform to talk. And so, what you are saying, nobody is listening except mine. "Am I your colleague? Do you think you're my colleague?...You sit somewhere and behave like you're talking to your co-equal. Am I your co-equal? If you're a hospital worker, who are you? Why do you have to behave in that manner? I've ended my speech. I'm not talking again. If you don't respect people ... I'm not talking again. Take your programme."

=== Trends and Public Usage ===
People began making their own meanings to the phrase other than its original or traditional meaning. A typical example is the spelling of the word in another way as "Tweeaa" to mean Traditional Way of Expressing Anger at Antagonism.

"Tweaa" also made its way to the Parliament of Ghana and its use was banned by Edward Adjaho, the speaker of parliament.

The former president of Ghana, President Mahama has also used the related phrase "Am I your co-equal?" which also featured in the viral video and "Tweaa" itself, whilst delivering the state of nation address in parliament.

The "Tweaa" expression has grown in such popularity that a Ghanaian developer has made an Android Application for it.
