= Nii Adu Daku Mantey =

Ghanaian politician

Hon. Nii Adu Daku Mantey

Member of Parliament for Klottey Korle Constituency
- In office 7 January 2005 – 6 January 2009
- President: John Kufuor

Member of Parliament for Klottey Korle Constituency
- In office 7 January 2001 – 6 January 2005
- President: John Kufuor

Personal details
- Party: New Patriotic Party
- Profession: Lawyer

Nii Adu Daku Mantey is a Ghanaian politician and a lawyer. He is a former member of parliament for the Klottey-Korle Constituency in the Greater Accra Region.

== Career ==
Daku Mantey is a lawyer by profession.

== Political career ==
Daku Mantey won his seat during the 2000 Ghanaian parliamentary election with a majority of 9018. He was a member of the 3rd parliament of the 4th republic and a member of the 4th parliament of the 4th republic representing the New Patriotic Party. He lost the seat in 2008 Ghanaian general election.

== Elections ==
Daku Mantey was elected as the member of parliament for the Klottey-Korle constituency of the Greater-Accra Region of Ghana for the first time in the 2000 Ghanaian general elections. He won on the ticket of the New Patriotic Party. His constituency was part of the 15 parliamentary seats out of 23 seats won by the New Patriotic Party. The New Patriotic Party won a majority total of 100 parliamentary seats out of 200 seats. He was elected with 29,240 votes out of total valid votes cast. This was equivalent to 51.70% of total valid votes cast. He was elected over David Lamptey of the National Democratic Congress, Nii Torgbor Coffie-Squire of the United Ghana Movement, Godwin Opare Addo of the Convention People's Party, Emmanuel C. Gustav-Lartey of the NRP and Alhaji U. Babamma Mohammed of the People's National Convention. These obtained 20,222, 2,1717, 2,298, 1,343 and 474 votes respectively of total valid votes cast. These were equivalent to 35.70%, 4.8%, 4.1%, 2.4% and 1.3% respectively of total valid votes cast.

In 2004, he contested for the Klottey-Korle parliamentary seat once more. He won on the ticket of the New Patriotic Party. His constituency was a part of the 16 parliamentary seats out of 27 seats won by the New Patriotic Party in that election for the Greater Accra Region. The New Patriotic Party won a majority total of 128 parliamentary seats out of 230 seats. He was elected with 32,263 votes out of 66,527 total valid votes cast. This was equivalent to 48.5% of total valid votes cast. He was elected over Richard Addo Buckman of the People's National Convention, Ashietey Nii Armah of the National Democratic Congress and Foli Emmanuel Wonder Kwadzo of the Convention People's Party. These obtained 910, 30,351 and 3,003 votes respectively of total valid votes cast. These were equivalent to 1.4%,48.5% and 4.5% respectively of total valid votes cast.
