= Abena Takyiwa =

Ghanaian politician

MP for Kwabre
- In office 7 January 1993 – 6 January 1997
- President: Jerry John Rawlings
- Preceded by: Constituency split
- Succeeded by: Nana Asante-Frimpong

Personal details
- Born: 25 December 1958 (age 67) Kwabre, Ashanti Region, Ghana)
- Party: National Democratic Congress
- Occupation: Politician
- Profession: Designer, printer

Abena Takyiwa (born 25 December 1958) is a Ghanaian politician and a member of the first Parliament of the fourth Republic representing the Kwabre constituency in the Ashanti Region.

== Early life and education ==
Abena was born on 25 December 1958 at Kwabre in the Ashanti Region of Ghana. She holds a Diploma in Fashion Design and Catering.

== Politics ==
Abena was first elected into Parliament on the ticket of the National Democratic Congress during the December 1992 Ghanaian General Election to represent the Kwabre Constituency of the Ashanti Region of Ghana. She served for one term as a member of parliament. She was succeeded by Nana Asante Frimpong of the New Patriotic Party during the 1996 Ghanaian general elections. He polled 33,035 votes representing 58.80% of the total valid votes cast against Oppong Kyekyeku Kwaku Kaaky of the National Democratic Congress who polled 10,808 votes representing 19.20%, Kwaku Dua-Twum of the National Congress Party also polled 1,499 votes representing 2.70%, and Abdullah Uthman of the People's National Congress polled 0 vote representing 0.00%.

== Career ==
Abena is a Printer and a Fashion designer by profession. She is the Former member of parliament for the Kwabre constituency in the Ashanti Region of Ghana.

== Personal life ==
Abena is a Christian.
