= Alhaji Issifu Azumah =

Ghanaian politician

Hon. Alhaji Issifu Azumah

Member of Parliament for West Mamprusi (Walewale) Constituency
- In office 7 January 2001 – 6 January 2005
- President: John Kufuor

Personal details
- Party: People's National Convention
- Profession: Politician

Alhaji Issifu Azumah is a Ghanaian politician and was the member of parliament for the West Mamprusi (Walewale) constituency in the Northern region of Ghana. He was a member of parliament in the 3rd parliament of the 4th republic of Ghana.

== Politics ==
Azumah is a member of the People's National Convention. He was elected as the member of parliament for the West Mamprusi (Walewale) constituency in the Northern region in the 3rd parliament of the 4th republic of Ghana. He was succeeded by Alidu Iddrisu Zakari after the constituency was renamed to Walewale(East) in the 2004 Ghanaian General elections.

Azumah was elected as the member of parliament for the West Mamprusi (Walewale) constituency in the 2000 Ghanaian general elections. He was elected on the ticket of the People's National Convention. His constituency was the only parliamentary seat out of 23 seats won by the People's National Convention in that election for the Northern Region. The People's National Convention won 3 parliamentary seat representation out of 200 seats in the 3rd parliament of the 4th republic of Ghana. He was elected with 18,907 votes out of 35,773 total valid votes cast. This was equivalent to 55.4% of the total valid votes cast. He was elected over Susanna Adam of the National Democratic Congress, Amadu Abdul-Karim of the New Patriotic Party, Shani Danladi of the Convention People's Party and Illiasu Yussif of the National Reform Party. These obtained 12,735, 1,509, 631 and 339 votes respectively out of the total valid votes cast. These were equivalent to 37.3%, 4.4%, 1.8% and 1.0% respectively of total valid votes cast.
