= Kwaku Adu Yeboah =

Ghanaian politician

MP for Agona East Constituency
- In office January 2001 – 2005
- President: John Agyekum Kuffuor
- Preceded by: Kojo Yankah
- Succeeded by: John Agyabeng
- Parliamentary group: National Democratic Congress
- Constituency: Agona East

Personal details
- Education: University of Cape Coast
- Occupation: Politician

Kwaku Adu Yeboah is a Ghanaian Politician and a member of the Third Parliament of the Fourth Republic representing the Agona East constituency in the Central Region of Ghana.

== Early life and education ==
Yeboah was born in Agona East, a town in the Central Region of Ghana. He studied at the University of Cape Coast.

== Politics ==
Kwaku Yeboah was first elected into Parliament on the ticket of the National Democratic Congress during the 2000 Ghanaian general election. He polled 10,989 votes out of the 23,936 votes valid votes cast, representing 45.9%. His opponents were John Agyabeng of the National Patriotic Party (NPP), Kofi Anane Adjei of the National Reform Party (NRP), Joseph Kodjo Duodu of the Convention People's Party (CPP) and Isaiah Kwame Asante of the People's National Convention (PNC). They had 44.60%, 7.60%, 1.10% and 0.80% of the total votes cast respectively. Kwaku took over from Kojo Yankah in 2000. He was defeated by John Agyabeng in the 2004 Ghanaian Parliamentary election.

== Career ==
Adu is a former member of Parliament for the Agona East Constituency in the Central Region of Ghana.
