= Edward Baffoe Bonnie =

Ghanaian politician

Hon. Edward Baffoe Bonnie

Member of parliament for Asokwa East constituency
- In office 7 January 2001 – 6 January 2005
- Preceded by: Ahmed Musah
- Parliamentary group: New Patriotic Party
- Constituency: Asokwa East

Personal details
- Occupation: Politician

Edward Baffoe Bonnie is a Ghanaian politician who served as a member of the Parliament of Ghana for the Asokwa East constituency in the Ashanti Region of Ghana.

== Career ==
Bonnie was elected during the 2000 Ghanaian general election on the ticket of the New Patriotic Party. He lost the seat in 2004 with the reconfiguration of the constituency. During his term, on 12 August 2003, he said that the government's decision to adopt the heavily indebted poor countries (HIPC) initiative was a prudent one that should be lauded by all Ghanaians rather than condemned; he stated that if Ghana had not joined the HIPC, the country would have faced worse economic hardships than "what we are experiencing presently." Flanked by Mr James Adusei-Sarkodie and Dr Edward Baffoe-Bonnie, Nana Asante Frempong, Former MP for Kwabre and Ashanti Regional Chairman of the Asante commended Nana Akufo-Addo for his efforts to re-mobilize members of Party who had served the Party but felt neglected due to the exigencies and certain circumstances. They encouraged him to do more to bring all members of the Party on board, especially, its foot soldiers and those who could support it to retain power next year.
