= Sampson Ottu Darkoh =

Ghanaian politician

Hon. Sampson Ottu Darkoh

Member of parliament for Ga North constituency
- In office 7 January 1997 – 6 January 2005
- Preceded by: Marian Lartele Lartey

Personal details
- Party: New Patriotic Party
- Occupation: Politician

Sampson Ottu Darkoh is a Ghanaian politician who served for the Ga North constituency in the Greater Accra Region of Ghana.

== Early life ==
Sampson Ottu Darkoh was born in Ga North in the Greater Accra Region of Ghana.

== Politics ==
Ottu began his political journey in 1997 after he was pronounced winner at the 1996 Ghanaian General Elections. He defeated Amadu Bukari Sorgho of the National Democratic Congress and Ibrahim Hollison of the National Independence Party with a close margin. He claimed 36.00% of the total votes cast while his opposition claimed 34.00% and 4.50% respectively. He was reelected during the 2000 Ghanaian general election as a member of the 3rd parliament of the 4th republic of Ghana with 40,327 votes on the ticket of the New Patriotic Party.
