= Augustus Obuadum Tanoh =

Ghanaian politician

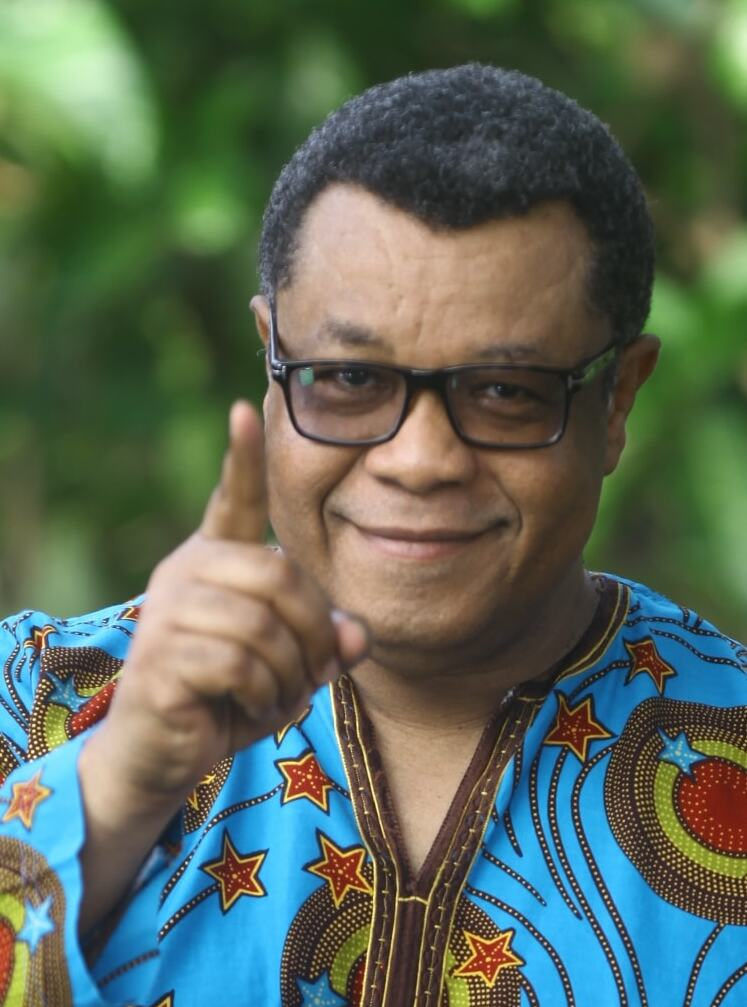
- Goosie Tanoh

Personal details
- Born: 7 February 1956 (age 70)
- Party: National Democratic Congress
- Other political affiliations: National Reform Party (1999–2007)
- Parent: Emmanuel Gyekye Tanoh (father)
- Education: Mfantsipim School University of Ghana; Northwestern University Law School
- Occupation: Politician; businessman
- Website: goosietanoh.org

Augustus "Goosie" Obuadum Tanoh (born 7 February 1956) is a Ghanaian politician and businessman. He was the leader of the National Reform Party, a breakaway group from the National Democratic Congress between 1999 and 2007 and represented this party in the 2000 presidential election, where he garnered 1.1% of the national vote. He returned to the National Democratic Congress with his colleagues from the National Reform Party at the behest and upon appeals made by President John Atta Mills in 2007/2008. Tanoh is originally a founding member of the National Democratic Congress.

== Education ==
Tanoh completed Mfantsipim school and holds a Bachelor of Law and Master of Law degrees from the University of Ghana and Northwestern University Law School in Chicago, Illinois, United States. He also holds a Certificate in Finance for Oil Industry Management (IHRDC) Washington DC, U.S.A.

== Career ==
Tanoh was a founding member of the National Democratic Congress party (NDC). He served on various finance and economic boards in Ghana, particularly as the executive director of Finance and Administration of the Ghana National Petroleum Corporation from 1989 to 1992.

He was a lecturer of law at the University of Ghana between 1982 and 1983. In 1983 he left the university to become the Special Assistant to the Chairman of the Provisional National Defence Council (PNDC) and Head of State of Ghana, Flight Lieutenant Jerry John Rawlings. Later in 1983 he was appointed as a Member of the National Defence Committee (the Principal Political Organ of the PNDC) and its Standing Committee. In this position, Mr. Tanoh was responsible for the Projects and Programs of a two million strong national, political and economic organization existing in all communities in Ghana responsible for primary health care, community shops and local infrastructure projects among the many developmental activities initiated during this period. In 1985 in addition to these duties, Mr. Tanoh was appointed to the Ghana Government Committee on Petroleum and Contract Negotiations responsible for restructuring the laws and structure of the Ghana Petroleum Industry and for the negotiation of Exploration and Production Sharing Agreements with International Oil Companies (IOCs). In 1986 with the election of Ghana to the United Nations Security Council, Mr. Tanoh was appointed by the Government of Ghana to serve as Advisor/ Counsellor and delegate of Ghana to the Security Council. In this role he was very active in formulating the positions of Ghana and the Non Aligned Group on major international issues such as ending the Iran/ Iraq War, the Nicaragua/ Contra standoff involving the United States, the security situation in Southern Africa (in particular the incursions of South African Defence forces in to the front line States in violation of International law) and many more of the complex issues facing the Council not least the question of peace and security in the Middle East. During this period he was also appointed a member of the Ghana Delegation to the United Nations General Assembly representing Ghana on the Special Political Committee, the Fourth and Sixth Committees of the General Assembly. He served in these capacities until July 1989. He served as a member of Ghana's diplomatic delegation to the UN from 1986 to 1989.

During his tenure at the United Nations, Mr. Tanoh was the Principal Negotiator for Ghana and the Spokesperson for the Group of 77 on the Mining Code for the Law of the Sea. He was elected Chairman of the Africa Group during the 1988/ 89 annual meeting of the Law of the Sea in Kingston, Jamaica.

He was also invited by the Aspen Institute in Colorado to participate in the Group of Experts Meeting preparatory to the World Environment Conference (Brazil) to prepare the initial indicative draft convention on Climate Change. He was appointed Rappoteur for a similar conference hosted by the Canadian Government in Ottawa in 1988/ 89.

Mr. Tanoh remained active in the setting up of Ghana's new institutions for the Petroleum Industry and acted as the North American Representative of the newly formed national oil company, Ghana National Petroleum Corporation (GNPC). In this position he initiated contacts with many North American companies who had shown an interest in doing business in Ghana. Some of these companies would eventually work and drill in Ghana.

On his return to Ghana, he took up the offer to become the executive director (Finance and Administration) of GNPC, Ghana's third largest company with an annual turn over at that time in excess of $300million. He served on its board of directors and Executive Management until 1992.

Mr. Tanoh played an important part in planning and executing the Government's strategy for its oil exploration activities as the Contract and Principal Tax negotiator for Petroleum Exploration Agreements with companies such as Amoco, Shell, Atlantic Richfield, Unocal and Diamond ShaMr.ock. Mr. Tanoh was also one of the principal authors of the Ghana Petroleum Income Tax Law and contributed to the drafting of The Petroleum Exploration and Production Law (PNDCL BF 84) and the GNPC Establishment Law (PNDCL 64).

During his stint at GNPC, Mr. Tanoh supervised the public corporations pioneering efforts to provide affordable public housing to its employees using local material inputs. The project in the order of $26million was successfully completed and to date, 95% of the 1200 units is now in the ownership of the corporation's employees.

Mr. Tanoh was also part of the team that negotiated Ghana's first syndicated loans: one for $75million in 1991 with Bankers Trust, and subsequently with ANZ Bank for $110million in 1992, with the proceeds of both loans going to GNPC. Since the pioneering role of GNPC in leveraging on Ghana's cocoa proceeds to enter the International Debt Market, several billion dollars have been raised in this fashion in a series of annual borrowings exceeding $1billion at a stretch.

Mr. Tanoh was a front-seat participant in the evolution of banking services in the West African region by virtue of his stint as a director of Ecobank Ghana Limited (1990–1992), a pioneering West African-owned bank and now authentically a continent wide African Bank.

He served in the assembly which wrote Ghana's 1992 constitution, as a representative of the grassroots based Committee for the Defence of the Revolution.

Mr. Tanoh after successfully assisting in the formation of the National Democratic Congress and working for its victory at the 1992 polls as Secretary of the Campaign Committee and one of its Principal Strategists, entered the private sector. Among his projects he pioneered non-traditional commodity exports from West Africa to the European Union in particular Cassava Chips, Groundnuts, Robusta Coffee, Hibiscus Flower, Red Sorghum, and Coarse Grain Cassava Flour (meal).Taking advantage of the free trade area established by ECOWAS he also established a trade in Palm Kernels exports from Ghana to Nigeria.

In 1999, he split from the ruling NDC party, citing issues of corruption and disorganization. He founded the National Reform Party (NRP) and ran the following year on the NRP ticket. He returned to NDC with his colleagues in the Reform Party at the behest and upon several appeals made by the late President John Atta Mills in 2007/2008. In 2012 when the position of vice-president came open, Tanoh was a leading candidate for the post.

In recent times, Mr. Tanoh has served as Director for Volta Aluminium Company, a two hundred thousand ton a year aluminium smelter in Tema-Ghana.

He also serves on the Board of Organic Potash Corporation (OPC), a listed Canadian Company using a unique patented technology to produce potassium carbonate (K_{2}CO_{3}) from cocoa husks free from heavy metals contamination. This product is used widely for alkalisation in the food and beverage industry, the pharmaceutical and related industries. He is a shareholder and Executive Vice President for OPC and country head for Ghana.

He has represented several international and local companies in negotiations with Government as Project Advisor/ Negotiator for Water Infrastructure, Solar Power Generation (155MW) and Software Development projects (Application to Government Accounting and Budgetary Operations).

Through one of his company's several important initiatives, projects have been incubated and are now the subject of joint ventures with internationally renowned companies. All are currently in development at various advanced stages of reaching Financial Close. These projects include the development and implementation of an offshore LNG Regasification Terminal, Electrical Power Project and Industrial Chemicals Plant.

He is currently Chairman of HML Marine, Power & Energy Limited (and its subsidiaries) an Energy Advisory, Infrastructure & Project Development Group.

== Sources ==
- "Goosie Obuadum Tanoh". Ghana Web.
