= Edward Osei-Kwaku =

Chartered accountant, politician, minister and member of parliament

Hon. Edward Osei-Kwaku

Member of Parliament for Asokwa West
- In office 7 January 1997 – 6 January 2005

Personal details
- Party: New Patriotic Party
- Spouse: Angelina Osei-Kwaku
- Children: Alison Osei-Kwaku, Eva Andoh-Poku, Irene Amankrah, Edward John Osei-Kwaku, Laydi Anis Antwi
- Occupation: Politician
- Profession: Lawyer

Edward Osei-Kwaku was a Ghanaian lawyer and politician. He served as the deputy Minister for Presidential Affairs, and Minister of Youth and Sports during the Kufuor administration. He also served as a member of parliament for the Asokwa West constituency from 7 January 1997 to 6 January 2005.

== Education ==
Osei-Kwaku was educated at Adisadel College (Cape Coast) and then at Prempeh College (Kumasi). From there, he obtained his Bachelor of Laws degree from the University of Ghana.

== Career ==
Prior to entering politics, Osei-Kwaku worked as a lawyer at his Law firm, Afriyie Chambers.

== Politics ==
Osei-Kwaku was a member of the New Patriotic Party, he served as the member of parliament for the Asokwa West constituency from 7 January 1997 to 6 January 2005. During the 1996 Ghanaian general election, he polled 42,734 votes which accounted for 52.7% of the total votes cast, and during the 2000 Ghanaian general election, he polled 48,738 votes which accounted for 74.5% of the total votes cast. During the Kufuor administration, he was appointed deputy Minister for Presidential Affairs and later Minister of Youth and Sports. During his tenure of office as the Minister of Youth and Sports, he helped initiate the bid for Ghana to host the CAN 2008 tournament. He also aided in the rehabilitation of Ghana's then major stadia, the Accra Sports Stadium and the Kumasi Sports Stadium (now Baba Yara Stadium).

== Personal life ==
Osei-Kwaku was a Christian and a member of the St Cyprian Anglican Church of Ghana. He died on Tuesday 13 September 2005.
