= Charles Wereko-Brobby =

Ghanaian engineer, politician, diplomat and businessman

Chief Executive Officer of Volta River Authority
- In office 24 August 2001 – 17 September 2003
- Preceded by: Gilbert Ohene Dokyi
- Succeeded by: Kweku Andoh Awotwi

Personal details
- Party: -
- Other political affiliations: New Patriotic Party; United Ghana Movement
- Education: St. Augustine's College University of Leeds; Middlesex University

Charles Wereko-Brobby popularly known as Tarzan (born 27 March 1953) is a Ghanaian engineer, politician, diplomat and businessman in Ghana. He was once the chief executive officer of Ghana's Volta River Authority, then the country's major power generator and distributor.

== Early life and education ==
Wereko-Brobby was born in Kumasi in March 1953. He attended St. Augustine's College and the prestigious Achimota School. He was then educated at the University of Leeds, Leeds, United Kingdom where he was awarded a Bachelor of Science degree in Fuel and Combustion Engineering and a PhD in Solar Energy Engineering. He was President of Leeds University Union from 1978 to 1979, the first African to be elected in that role. Wereko-Brobby also holds a Master of Business Administration degree from the University of Middlesex, Hendron, UK.

== Career ==
Prior to moving back to Ghana after studies, he worked at the Commonwealth Science Council, Commonwealth Secretariat, London as the Chief of the Energy and Environmental Planning Programme.

In 1988, Wereko-Brobby was appointed the Energy Policy Adviser to the PNDC and executive director of the National Energy Board. In 1995, he was also appointed the Consulting Energy Economist to the African Development Bank's (ADB) African Energy Programme.

In the mid-1990s, he established the Independent Media Corporation of Ghana and in turn founded Radio Eye, Ghana's first independent radio station, being an advocate of press freedom - after the government took the station off the air, he was approached by David Ampofo for an interview on the talkshow Time With David, which he agreed to.

He was appointed as chief executive officer of Ghana's Volta River Authority, by the John Agyekum Kufuor government on 24 August 2001 which at that time was Ghana's major power generator and distributor. Prior to being the CEO he was the presidential advisor on Energy and the chairman of the VRA board which was yet to be officially inaugurated. He subsequently resigned on 17 September 2003 after being in charge for two years.

He was the chief executive of the Ghana at 50 secretariat, responsible for planning Ghana's 50th Jubilee in 2007. After President John Evans Atta Mills won the elections in 2008, as Wereko-Brobby had to appear before numerous commission of inquiries and courts to answer for his stewardship of the commission.

== Political career ==
In the 1990s as a political activist, Wereko-Brobby played an key role in the Alliance For Change (AFC) movement, a political pressure group that organized demonstrations against the introduction of Value Added Tax (VAT) by the then ruling National Democratic Congress government of President Jerry John Rawlings in 1995.

He is a founding member of the New Patriotic Party. Wereko-Brobby ran for President of Ghana in the 2000 Ghanaian general election as leader of the United Ghana Movement (UGM). He formed the UGM in 1996 after leaving the New Patriotic Party (NPP). Wereko-Brobby came seventh with 0.3% of the popular vote. John Agyekum Kufor won the elections after a run off.

In February 2010, he stood for the Chairmanship position of the New Patriotic Party against and Jake Obetsebi-Lamptey, Stephen Ayensu Ntim, Sammy Crabbe and Felix Owusu Adjepong. He came fourth whilst Jake Otanka Obetsebi-Lamptey won and was declared winner

After the NPP lost power to the NDC in 2012, Wereko-Brobby came out strongly to advise the party to abandon its legal fight to overturn the Electoral Commission's verdict in the courts and rather concentrate on winning the 2016 elections. He was criticized by members of his party for making such comments statements against his own party and was subsequently suspended by the National Executive Committee of the party after describing the party's principal witness in the petition, who was also their vice presidential candidate in the 2012 General elections, Mahamadu Bawumia, as confused and clueless. He later rendered an apology to the party and Mahamadu Bawumia for the comments made.

== Personal life ==
He married Harriet Wilson after being divorced from Joyce Aryee, a former CEO of Ghana Chamber of Mines and former secretary of information for the PNDC. He is also the nephew of Victor Owusu a founding father of the NPP.

== Author and fellowship ==
Wereko-Brobby has authored several technical papers and reports on energy, development and environment along with two university level textbooks on energy and development. He is a Fellow of the Institute of Petroleum, UK and was a Research Fellow in Management Science at the Imperial College of Science and Technology, London.

== Awards and honours ==
Wereko-Brobby was awarded at the 2018 Ghana Energy Awards along with Tsatsu Tsikata with a Lifetime Achievement Award for their notable efforts regarding policy and other critical issues relating to the sector that formed the core mandates of the Energy Commission and energy sector in Ghana.
