= Fomena (Ghana parliament constituency) =

Constituency in the Ashanti Region of Ghana

- constituency for the Parliament of Ghana
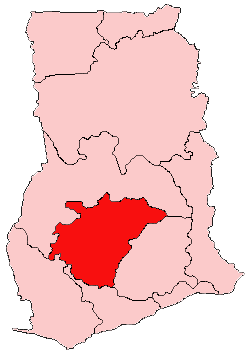
- District: Adansi North District
- Region: Ashanti Region of Ghana

Current constituency
- Created: 2021
- Party: Independent
- MP: Andrew Asiamah Amoako

Fomena is one of the constituencies represented in the Parliament of Ghana. It elects one Member of Parliament (MP) by the first past the post system of election. Fomena is located in the Adansi North District of the Ashanti Region of Ghana.

== Boundaries ==
The seat is located within the Adansi North district of the Ashanti Region of Ghana. This constituency has had five MPs since the beginning of the fourth republic.

== Members of Parliament ==
Election	Member	Party
1992	Nana Odame Kusi	National Democratic Congress
1996	Akwasi Afrifa	New Patriotic Party
2007	Nana Abu-Bonsra	New Patriotic Party
2012	Atta Boafo Daniel Kingsley	New Patriotic Party
2016	Andrew Amoako Asiamah	New Patriotic Party

== Elections ==
2016 Ghanaian general election : Fomena Source:GhanaWeb
Party	Candidate	Votes	%	±%
NPP	Andrew Amoako Asiamah	14,823	72.7	
NDC	William Adjei-Mensah	4,180	20.5	
PPP	Dawud Suleiman	1,093	5.36	
CPP	Kwadwo Osei	293	1.44	
Majority		10,643	52.2	
Turnout				

2012 Ghanaian general election : Fomena Source:GhanaWeb
Party	Candidate	Votes	%	±%
NPP	Atta Boafo Daniel Kingsley	13,812	67.76	
NDC	Jerry John Appiah	6,382	31.31	
Convention People's Party	Mercy Baffour-Dwumah	190	0.93	
Majority		7,430	36.45	
Turnout				

2008 Ghanaian general election : Fomena Source:GhanaWeb
Party	Candidate	Votes	%	±%
NPP	Nana Abu-Bonsra	11,787	70.8	
NDC	Samuel Pinkrah	3,430	20.6	
Convention People's Party	James Kobina Seotah	1,356	8.1	
Democratic People's Party	Augustine Kofi Tieku	77	0.5	
Majority		8,357	50.2	
Turnout				

Fomena by-election, 2007 Source:Ghana Home Page
Party	Candidate	Votes	%	±%
NPP	Nana Abu Bonsra	9,525	81.8	+28.9
NDC	Grace Ampofo	2,003	17.2	−9.2
Democratic People's Party	Augustina Kyei	110	0.9	N/A
Majority		7,522	64.6	+48.1
Turnout		11,785	69.0	

2004 Ghanaian parliamentary election: Fomena Source:Ghana Home Page
Party	Candidate	Votes	%	±%
NPP	Akwasi Afrifa	8,207	52.9	−18.7
Independent	George Kofi Tieku	4,096	26.4	N/A
NDC	John Toku	2,009	12.9	−8.4
Convention People's Party	Seota Kobina James	1,146	7.4	+4.7
Independent	Thomas Ampoma	70	0.5	N/A
Majority		4,111	16.5	−33.8

2000 Ghanaian parliamentary election: Fomena Source:Adam Carr's Election Archives
Party	Candidate	Votes	%	±%
NPP	Akwasi Afrifa	9,389	71.6	
NDC	William Kofi Donkor	2,787	21.3	
Convention People's Party	Samuel K. A. Agyin	361	2.7	
United Ghana Movement	Adansi Gyimah Ernest	214	1.6	
People's National Convention	Eric Kofi Owusu	186	1.4	
National Reform Party	Charles K Amponsaa	167	1.3	
Majority		6,602	50.3	
Turnout		13,104	72.7	

1996 Ghanaian parliamentary election: Fomena Source:Peace FM Online
Party	Candidate	Votes	%	±%
NPP	Akwasi Afrifa	8,262	50.9	
NDC	Joseph Kwasi Amoako	4,835	29.8	
Majority		1,660	21.1	
Turnout				

== See also ==
- List of Ghana Parliament constituencies
- List of political parties in Ghana
