= David Yaw Mensah =

Ghanaian politician

Hon. David Yaw Mensah

Member of Parliament for Atebubu North Constituency
- In office 7 January 1997 – 6 January 2001
- President: Jerry John Rawlings

Member of Parliament for Atebubu North Constituency
- In office 7 January 2001 – 6 January 2005
- President: John Kufuor

Personal details
- Party: National Democratic Congress
- Education: Presby Training College, Akropong
- Profession: Politician Teacher

David Yaw Mensah is a Ghanaian politician and was the member of parliament for the Atebubu North constituency in the Brong Ahafo region of Ghana. He was a member of parliament in the 2nd and 3rd parliament of the 4th republic of Ghana.

== Early life and education ==
Mensah was born in January 1943. He attended the Presby Training College in Akropong in the Eastern Region of Ghana. From there he obtained a teacher training certificate.

== Career ==
Mensah is a Teacher by profession. He is also a Ghanaian politician.

== Politics ==
Mensah is a member of the National Democratic Congress. He was elected as the member of parliament to represent the Atebubu North constituency in the Brong Ahafo region in the 2nd and 3rd parliament of the 4th republic of Ghana. He was succeeded by Emmanuel Owusu Mainu after the constituency was changed to Atebubu-Amantin constituency in the 2004 Ghanaian General elections.

=== Elections ===
Mensah was elected into the first parliament of the fourth republic of Ghana on 7 January 1993 after emerging winner at the 1992 Ghanaian parliamentary election held on 29 December 1992

He was elected as the member of parliament for the Atebubu North constituency in the 1996 Ghanaian general election. He won the poll with 22,140 votes which is equivalent to 47.40% of the total vote. He also contested for the same office in the 2000 Ghanaian general elections. He was elected on the ticket of the National Democratic Congress. His constituency was a part of the 7 parliamentary seats out of 21 seats won by the National Democratic Congress in that election for the Brong Ahafo Region. The National Democratic Congress won a minority total of 92 parliamentary seats out of 200 seats in the 3rd parliament of the 4th republic of Ghana. He was elected with 13,229 votes out of 29,893 total valid votes cast. This was equivalent to 44.6% of the total valid votes cast. He was elected over Joseph Kwabena Manu an independent candidate, Winston Samuel Binabiba of the National Reform Party, Mahama Ikunjoony. of the New Patriotic Party, Francis Kwabena Dorkoseh of the People's National Convention and Niekuu Bayor Franklin of the Convention People's Party These obtained 10,563, 533, 529 and 177votes respectively out of the total valid votes cast. These were equivalent to 39.5%, 2.0%, 2.0% and 0.7% respectively of total valid votes cast.

== Personal life ==
Mensah is a Christian.
