= Cassiel Ato Forson =

Ghanaian politician

Hon. Dr. Cassiel Ato Baah Forson MP
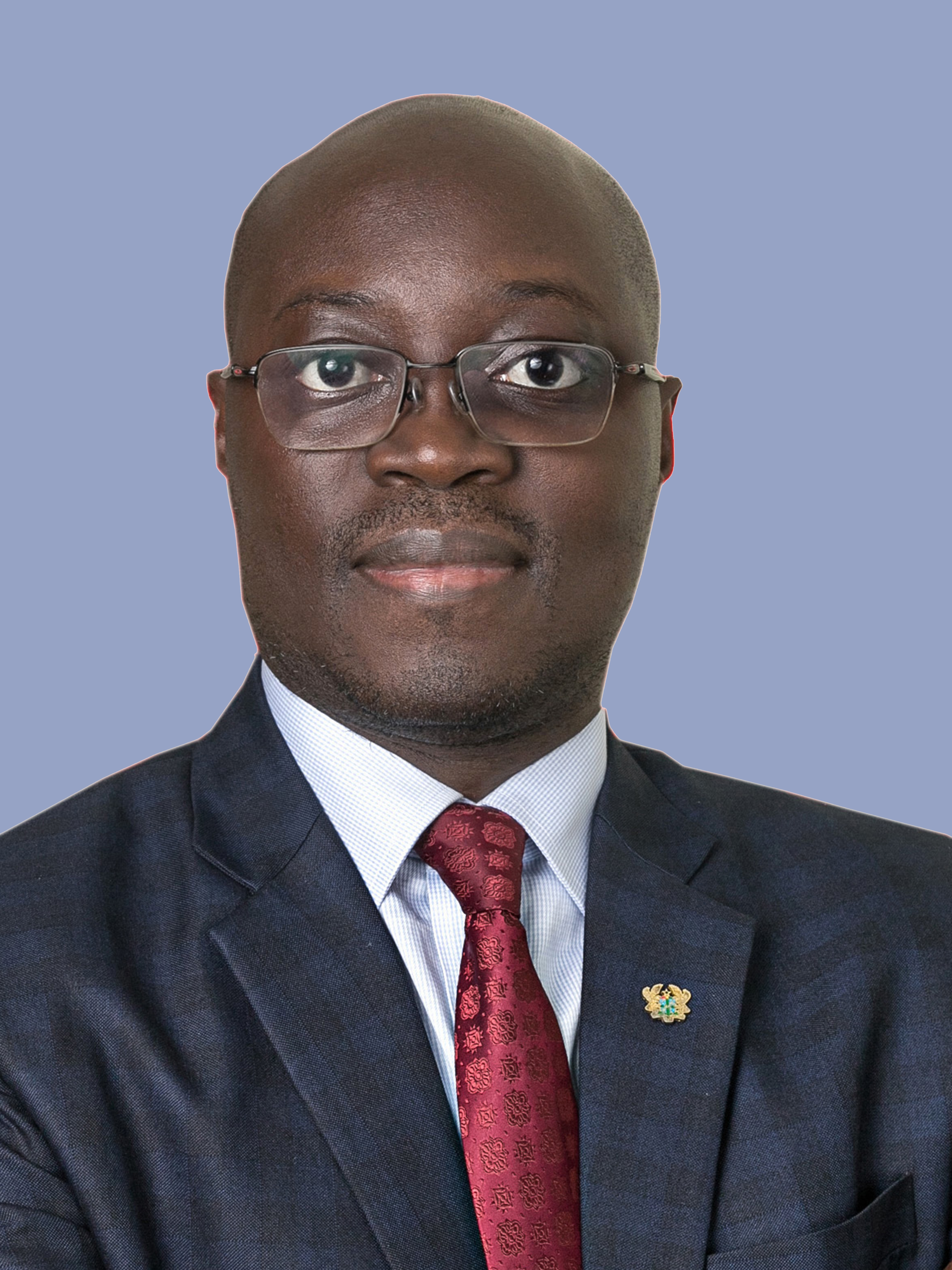

Member of Ghana Parliament for Ajumako-Enyan-Esiam
- Incumbent
- Assumed office 7 January 2009

Minister for Finance and Economic Planning
- Incumbent
- Assumed office 22 January 2025
- President: John Mahama
- Preceded by: Mohammed Amin Adam

Deputy Minister for Finance
- In office March 2013 – January 2017
- President: John Dramani Mahama
- Preceded by: Fiifi Kwetey
- Succeeded by: Charles Adu Boahen

Majority Leader in Parliament
- In office 7 January 2025 – 21 January 2025
- Preceded by: Afenyo-Markin (NPP)
- Succeeded by: Mahama Ayariga (NDC)

Minority Leader in Parliament
- In office January 2023 – January 2025
- Preceded by: Haruna Iddrisu (NDC)
- Succeeded by: Afenyo-Markin (NPP)

Personal details
- Born: 5 August 1978 (age 48) Ajumako Bisease, Ghana
- Party: National Democratic Congress
- Children: 2
- Education: University of Oxford, Kwame Nkrumah University of Science and Technology, South Bank University, Bisease Secondary School
- Occupation: Politician
- Profession: Accountant
- Committees: Finance Committee (Ranking Member): House Committee; Foreign Affairs Committee; Committee of Selection Committee
- Website: https://cassielatoforson.org/

Cassiel Ato Baah Forson (born 5 August 1978) is a Ghanaian politician and member of parliament from 2009 to date. Forson first joined the Fifth Parliament of the Fourth Republic of Ghana, before retaining his seat for the Sixth Parliament of the Fourth Republic of Ghana, Seventh Parliament of the Fourth Republic of Ghana and the Eighth Parliament of the Fourth Republic of Ghana representing the Ajumako-Enyan-Esiam Constituency in the Central Region on the ticket of the National Democratic Congress (NDC). In 2013 he served as the deputy minister for Finance. He was sworn in as Minister for Finance By President John Mahama in 2025

== Early life and education ==
Forson was born on 5 August 1978 and hails from Ajumako Bisease in the Central Region of Ghana. He had his basic education at Bethel Hill D/A Basic school at Ajumako Bisease where he passed a Common Entrance exams at Basic 6 to enter Secondary school. He attended Bisease Secondary School for his GCE O Levels. He obtained a PhD in Business and Management (finance option) in September 2020 from the Kwame Nkrumah University of Science and Technology (KNUST) in Ghana. Prior to getting the doctorate, the MP had two master's degrees: A master of Science in Taxation from the University of Oxford, UK and another Master of Science degree in economics from KNUST. He had his first degree in accounting at the South Bank University in London.

Forson is a member of the Institute of Chartered Accountants, Ghana and a fellow of Chartered Institute of Taxation.

== Career ==
Forson is a Ghanaian Legislator, Fiscal Economist, Chartered Accountant, Tax practitioner and Entrepreneur with professional experience spanning two decades in both private and public sectors. He was the managing director of Forson Contracts Limited in the United Kingdom. He also served as the chief executive officer for Omega Africa Holding Limited.

Throughout his career, Dr Cassiel Ato Forson has been a strong advocate of good governance, transparency and accountability. He is widely respected in the Central Region and across Ghana for his dedication to the service of his country and constituents. He was appointed acting minister of defence, following the death of the minister of defence Edward Omane Boamah in a helicopter crash.

== Politics ==
Forson is a member of the National Democratic Congress (NDC). He has been the NDC Member of Parliament for Ajumako-Enyan-Esiam constituency since 2009. Currently, he is the Minority Leader

=== 2008 elections ===
In 2008, he contested in the Ghanaian General Elections and won. He garnered 18, 593 votes which represents 51.66% of the total votes cast and hence defeated the other contestants including William Kow Arthur-Baiden, Alex Arthur, Rexford Mensah and Evans Addo-Nkum.

=== 2012 elections ===
Under the ticket of the National Democratic Congress again, he contested in the 2012 Ghanaian General Elections and won by obtaining 24,752 votes which represented 52.67% of the total votes cast.

=== 2016 elections ===
He contested again in the 2016 Ghanaian General Elections and won, giving him the chance to represent his constituency for the third term. In that election, he contested against Ransford Emmanuel Kwesi Nyarko, Jerry Henry Quansah, Sarah Mensah and Monica Daapong. He defeated them by obtaining 25,601 votes which represented 53.55% of the total votes cast.

=== 2020 elections ===
In the 2020 Ghanaian general elections, he again won the parliamentary seat with 39,229 votes making 58.1% of the total votes cast whiles the NPP parliamentary candidate Etuaful Rashid Kwesi had 28,229 votes making 41.8% of the total votes cast and the NDP parliamentary candidate Samuel Akombisa had 117 votes making 0.2% of the total votes cast.

=== 2024 elections ===
President John Dramani Mahama has named Dr Cassiel Ato Forson as Ghana's next Minister for Finance, a critical appointment in his newly released ministerial list.

Dr. Forson's nomination signals the government's intention to focus on stabilising the country's economy and implementing key fiscal reforms to drive growth and development.

Dr. Ato Forson is no stranger to the Finance Ministry, having previously served as a Deputy Minister for Finance under President Mahama's administration.

During his tenure, he was instrumental in managing Ghana's fiscal policies, negotiating key financial agreements, and supervising economic initiatives aimed at strengthening the country's financial health.

=== Deputy Minister for Finance ===
In 2009, he became a member of the Parliament of Ghana and served as the deputy minister for Finance in 2013. As deputy Minister he served as a member of Ghana's Economic Management Team. He has also served on several boards including that of the Bank of Ghana and Ghana Cocoa Board. He was also Ghana's Alternate Governor at the International Monetary Fund (IMF) and the World Bank. His expertise was also brought to light when he chaired the Committee that implemented the Ghana Integrated Financial Management Information System Reforms (GIFMIS).

=== Committees ===
Forson is a Ranking Member of the Finance Committee; a member of the House Committee; a member of the Foreign Affairs Committee and also a member of the Committee of Selection Committee; special budget committee; House committee.

=== Domestic Debt Exchange Programme (DDEP) ===
In July 2026, Dr. Forson announced that the government had begun saving towards a GH¢54 billion payment obligation under the Domestic Debt Exchange Programme (DDEP), due 2027. He stated that buffers have already been built to settle two major repayments of GH¢10 billion each in February and August 2026.

=== Economic Policy Transition ===
In July 2026, Dr. Forson stated that the government was preparing to transition Ghana's economic management strategy from strict fiscal consolidation to a growth-focused agenda. He explained that the country has undergone 18 months of fiscal adjustment measures, with six months remaining before a gradual shift towards policies prioritizing growth and employment.

== Personal life ==
Forson is a Christian. He is married and has two children.

== Controversy ==
Forson was alleged to have caused financial loss to Ghana in a procurement of 200 ambulances between 2014 and 2016.

Eventually, Forson and two others were sent to court to answer for charges including wilfully causing financial loss to the state. In court, Forson lawyers told the Court their client did not have a case to answer. However, in March 2023, the Accra High Court where the case was being heard ordered Ato Forson to open his defense. Forson and his lawyers did not take kindly to the decision and made an appeal at the Court of Appeal.

In July 2024, the Appeals Court did not only set aside the High Court's decision for Forson and the two others to open their defence, it also acquitted and discharged them of all the charges.
