= Samuel Nii-Aryeetey Attoh =

Ghanaian politician

Hon. Samuel Nii-Aryeetey Attoh

Member of Parliament for Trobu-Amasaman Constituency
- In office 7 January 2005 – 6 January 2009
- President: John Kufuor

Personal details
- Born: 26 June 1956 (age 70)
- Died: 6 February 2017
- Party: New Patriotic Party
- Education: University of Ghana
- Profession: Technical Officer

Samuel Nii-Aryeetey Attoh was a Ghanaian politician and technical officer. He served as a member of parliament for Trobu-Amasaman constituency.

== Early life and education ==
Samuel Nii-Aryeetey Attoh was born on 26 June 1956. He was a product of the University of Ghana. He obtained a Diploma in Education from the university.

== Career ==
Attoh was a technical officer by profession.

== Political career ==
Attoh was a member of the New Patriotic Party. He became a member of parliament from January 2005 after emerging winner in the General Election in December 2004. He was the MP for Trobu-Amasaman constituency.

== Elections ==
In 2004, he contested for the Trobu-Amasaman parliamentary seat. He won on the ticket of the New Patriotic Party. His constituency was a part of the 16 parliamentary seats out of 27 seats won by the New Patriotic Party in that election for the Greater Accra Region. The New Patriotic Party won a majority total of 128 parliamentary seats out of 230 seats. He was elected with 31,459 votes out of 69,090 total valid votes cast. This was equivalent to 45.5% of total valid votes cast. He was elected over Daniel Addoquaye Pappoe of the People's National Convention, Ernest Attuquaye Armah of the National Democratic Congress, Foli Emmanuel Wonder Kwadzo of the Convention People's Party and Lawrence Kessy an independent candidate. These obtained 1,044, 31,017, 4,013 and 1,557 votes respectively of total valid votes cast. These were equivalent to 1.5%,44,9%, 5.8% and 2.3% respectively of total valid votes cast.

== Personal life ==
Attoh was a Christian.

== Death ==
Attoh died on 6 February 2017.
