= Ahafo Ano South (Ghana parliament constituency) =

Ghana Parliament Constituency

- constituency for the Parliament of Ghana
- District: Ahafo Ano South District
- Region: Ashanti Region of Ghana

Current constituency
- Party: New Patriotic Party
- MP: Francis Manu Adabor (from 2013 to date)

Ahafo Ano South is one of the constituencies represented in the Parliament of Ghana. It elects one Member of Parliament (MP) by the first past the post system of election. Ahafo Ano South is located in the Ahafo Ano South district of the Ashanti Region of Ghana.

== Boundaries ==
The seat is located within the Ahafo Ano South District of the Ashanti Region of Ghana. Region, Ahafo Ano North Municipal in the north-west, Atwima Nwabiagya Municipal in the south, and the Offinso North District in the east are its neighbors.

== Members of Parliament ==
Election	Member	Party
1992	Gabriel Barimah	National Democratic Congress
2000	Stephen Kwaku Balado Manu	New Patriotic Party

== Elections ==
2008 Ghanaian parliamentary election: Ahafo Ano South Source: Ghana Home Page
Party	Candidate	Votes	%	±%
New Patriotic Party	Stephen Kwaku Balado Manu	21,585	55.4	
National Democratic Congress	Thomas Kwakwah	16,008	41.1	
Independent	Andrew Kwasi Adjapong	433	1.1	
People's National Convention	Nyamesem Wilson	347	0.9	
Convention People's Party	Acheampong J. Martin	327	0.8	
Independent	Yaw Agyemang	236	0.6	
Majority		5,577	14.3	

== See also ==
- List of Ghana Parliament constituencies
