= Isaac Eduasar Edumadzi =

Ghanaian politician (1957-2018)

Hon. Isaac Eduasar Edumadzi
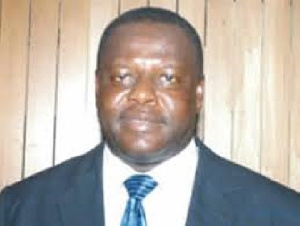

Member of Parliament for Ajumako-Enyan-Esiam Constituency
- In office 6 January 1997 – 6 January 2001
- President: Jerry John Rawlings

Member of the Ghana Parliament for Ajumako-Enyan-Esiam
- In office 7 January 2001 – 6 January 2005
- President: John Kufuor

Member of Parliament for Ajumako-Enyan-Esiam Constituency
- In office 7 January 2005 – 6 January 2009
- President: John Kufuor

Central Regional Minister
- In office 7 January 2001 – 6 January 2005
- President: John Kufuor

Personal details
- Born: 1 January 1957
- Died: 11 January 2018 (aged 61)
- Party: New Patriotic Party
- Profession: Politician

Isaac Eduasar Edumadzi (1 January 1957, Central Region — 11 January 2018, Cape Coast) was a Ghanaian politician and a member of the New Patriotic Party. He was the Member of Parliament for the Ejumako/Enyan/Essiam in the Central region. He served under the administration of the former president John Agyekum Kufour in the fourth parliament of the fourth Republic of Ghana.

== Political career ==
Isaac Edumadze was first elected into Parliament on the ticket of the New Patriotic Party during the General Elections for the Ejumako/Enyan/Essiam constituency in the Central Region of Ghana. He polled 15,660 votes out of the 34,953 valid votes cast representing 32.10% over his opponents Joseph K.Enos an NDC member who polled 14,839 votes, Lawrence Yaw Awuah a CPP member who polled 3,672 votes and Joseph Mensah a PNC member who polled 782 votes. He contested in 2000 and won with 15,336 votes out of the 30,500 valid votes cast representing 50.30% over his opponents Mary Padmore Dadzie an NDC member who polled 12,681 votes, Kwame Adomako-Mensah a NRP member who polled 1,314 votes, Jonathan Siliman Otabil a CPP member who polled 747 votes, Robert Anthony Gyaisie a PNC member who polled 307 votes and Kojo Banafo a UGM member who polled 115 votes.

He was a member of the New Patriotic Party. He was appointed the Central Regional Minister in February 2001 by J.A Kufour. He became a member of parliament from January 2005 after winning the General Election in December 2004 Ghanaian general election. He was elected as the member of parliament for the Ejumako/Enyan/Essiam constituency in the fourth parliament of the fourth Republic of Ghana under His excellency former J.A Kufour's administration. He obtain a total vote cast of 21,534 which represent 57.80% whiles his opponents candidates, Samuel Aggrey Forson of the National Democratic Congress pulled 14,474 representing 38.80% of the votes, Kwame Asoandze Edu-Ansah of the Convention People's Party obtained 1,276 also representing 3.40% of the vote cast while James Appiah-Mensah an independence candidate had no vote making him, Isaac Edumadze, emerge as the winner of the Ejumako/Enyan/Essiam constituency. Isaac also represented his constituency in the 2nd Parliament of the 4th Republic. He was elected after he was pronounced winner of the 1996 Ghanaian General Elections.

== Personal life ==
He was a well-known farmer in the Ajumako area in the central region and a devoted Christian as well.

== Death ==
He was reported to have died on 11 January 2018 in the Cape Coast Teaching Hospital in the afternoon. He had been known to be not in a good condition and was rushed to the hospital only to last a few minutes longer.
