= Samuel Nkrumah Gyimah =

Ghanaian politician

Hon. Samuel Nkrumah Gyimah

Member of Parliament for Odotobri Constituency
- In office 7 January 1997 – 6 January 2005
- President: John Kufuor

Personal details
- Party: New Patriotic Party
- Profession: Teacher

Samuel Nkrumah Gyimah is a Ghanaian politician and also a teacher. He served as a member of parliament for the Odotobri constituency in Ashanti region of Ghana in the 2nd and 3rd Parliament of the 4th Republic of Ghana.

== Politics ==
He is a member of the 3rd parliament of the 4th republic of Ghana who took seat during the 2000 Ghanaian general election. He represented in 1996 Ghanaian general election on the ticket of the New Patriotic Party. Unfortunately, he lost the seat in 2004 to Emmanuel Akwasi Gyamfi of New Patriotic Party. During his seat, Mr Samuel Nkrumah Gyimah has appealed to the government to construct and rehabilitate feeder roads and culverts in the rural areas.

== Elections ==
Gyimah was first elected into Parliament on the ticket of the New Patriotic Party during the December 1996 Ghanaian General Elections for the Odotobri Constituency in the Ashanti Region of Ghana. He 17,564 votes out of the 25,065 valid votes cast representing 58.30% against George Adu-Mensah an NDC member who polled7,501 votes and Veronica Rita Akosua Nsafoah an IDN member who poled 0 vote.

Gyimah was elected as the member of parliament for the Odotobri constituency of the Ashanti Region of Ghana in the 2000 Ghanaian general elections. He won on the ticket of the New Patriotic Party. His constituency was a part of the 31 parliamentary seats out of 33 seats won by the New Patriotic Party in that election for the Ashanti Region. The New Patriotic Party won a majority total of 100 parliamentary seats out of 200 seats. He was elected with 18,395 votes out of total valid votes cast. This was equivalent to 80% of total valid votes cast. He was elected over John A. Frimpong of the National Democratic Congress, Francis A.A. Minta of the Convention People's Party and Isaac Owusu of the People's National Convention. These obtained 3,579, 668 and 357 votes respectively of total valid votes cast. These were equivalent to 15.6%, 2.9% and 1.6% respectively of total valid votes cast.
