= Prince Oduro-Mensah =

Ghanaian politician

MP for Techiman South
- In office 7 January 2001 – 6 January 2005
- President: John Agyekum Kufour

Personal details
- Born: Techiman soiuth, Brong Ahafo Region
- Party: New Patriotic Party
- Education: Kwame Nkrumah University of Science and Technology
- Occupation: Politician

Prince Oduro-Mensah is a Ghanaian Politician and a member of the Third Parliament of the Fourth Republic Representing the Techiman South Constituency in the Brong Ahafo Region of Ghana.

== Early life and education ==
Mensah was born in 1958 at Techiman South, a town in the Brong Ahafo Region of Ghana. He attended the Kwame Nkrumah University of Science and Technology and obtained a Degree. He attended the University of Education, Winneba and obtained a Diploma in Social Science and English Education.

== Politics ==
Mensah was first elected into Parliament on the Ticket of the New Patriotic Party during the December 2000 Ghanaian General Elections for the Techiman South Constituency in the Brong Ahafo Region of Ghana.He polled 17,350 votes out of the 39,137 valid votes cast representing 44.30%. He won on the ticket of the New Patriotic Party and thus represented the Techiman South constituency in the 3rd parliament of the 4th republic of Ghana. Mensah's constituency was a part of the 14 parliamentary seats out of 21 seats won by the New Patriotic Party in that election for the Brong Ahafo Region. The New Patriotic Party won a majority total of 100 parliamentary seats out of 200 seats in the 3rd parliament of the 4th republic of Ghana. He was elected over Kwadwo Maama Adam of the National Democratic Congress, Joshua Kwame Owusu-Brempong an independent candidate, Moses Kofi Boakye of the Convention People's Party, Afrifa Okyere Benjamin of the United Ghana Movement Party and Kofi Boakye Saarah-Mensah of the National Reform Party. These obtained 16,936, 3,465, 990, 273 and 123 votes respectively out of the total valid votes cast. These were equivalent to 43.30%, 8.90%, 2.50%, 0.70% and 0.30% respectively of total valid votes cast.

== Career ==
Mensah is a former member of Parliament for the Techiman South Constituency in the Brong Ahafo Region of Ghana.
