= Stephen Adoma-Yeboah =

Ghanaian politician

Hon. Stephen Adoma-Yeboah

Member of Parliament for Dormaa East Constituency
- In office 7 January 2001 – 6 January 2005
- President: John Kufuor
- Preceded by: None

Personal details
- Born: Wednesday, June 1, 1951. Wamanafo), Bono-Ahafo Region, Ghana.
- Party: New Patriotic Party
- Children: Karen Adoma-Yeboah, David Adoma-Yeboah, Stephen Adoma-Yeboah JR., Blessing Adoma-Yeboah, Gabriel Adoma-Yeboah, and Prince Kelvin Adoma-Yeboah.
- Occupation: Lecturer/ Lawyer/ Politician
- Profession: Lecturer/ Lawyer/ Politician

Mr. Stephen Adoma-Yeboah is a Ghanaian politician and was the member of parliament for the Dormaa East constituency in the Brong Ahafo region of Ghana. He was a member of parliament in the 3rd parliament of the 4th republic of Ghana.

== Politics ==
Mr. Adoma-Yeboah is a member of the New Patriotic Party. He was elected as the member of parliament for the Dormaa East constituency in the Brong Ahafo region in the 3rd parliament of the 4th republic of Ghana. He was succeeded by Yaw Ntow Ababio in the 2004 Ghanaian General elections.

== Elections ==
Mr. Adoma-Yeboah was elected as the member of parliament for the Dormaa East constituency in the 2000 Ghanaian general elections. He was first to be elected on the ticket of the New Patriotic Party. His constituency was a part of the 14 parliamentary seats out of 21 seats won by the New Patriotic Party in that election for the Brong Ahafo Region. The New Patriotic Party won a majority total of 100 parliamentary seats out of 200 seats in the 3rd parliament of the 4th republic of Ghana. He was elected with 9,782 votes out of 16,138 total valid votes cast. This was equivalent to 60.9% of the total valid votes cast. He was elected over Nicholas Kwabena Agyei-Kyereme of the National Democratic Congress, Obeng Kwasi Emmanuel of the National Reform Party and Kyeremeh Addae Hinneh of the Convention People's Party. These obtained 5,599, 397 and 291votes respectively out of the total valid votes cast. These were equivalent to 34.8%, 2.5% and 1.8% respectively of total valid votes cast.
