= Akwasi Afrifa (Fomena politician) =

Ghanaian politician

Hon. Akwasi Afrifa
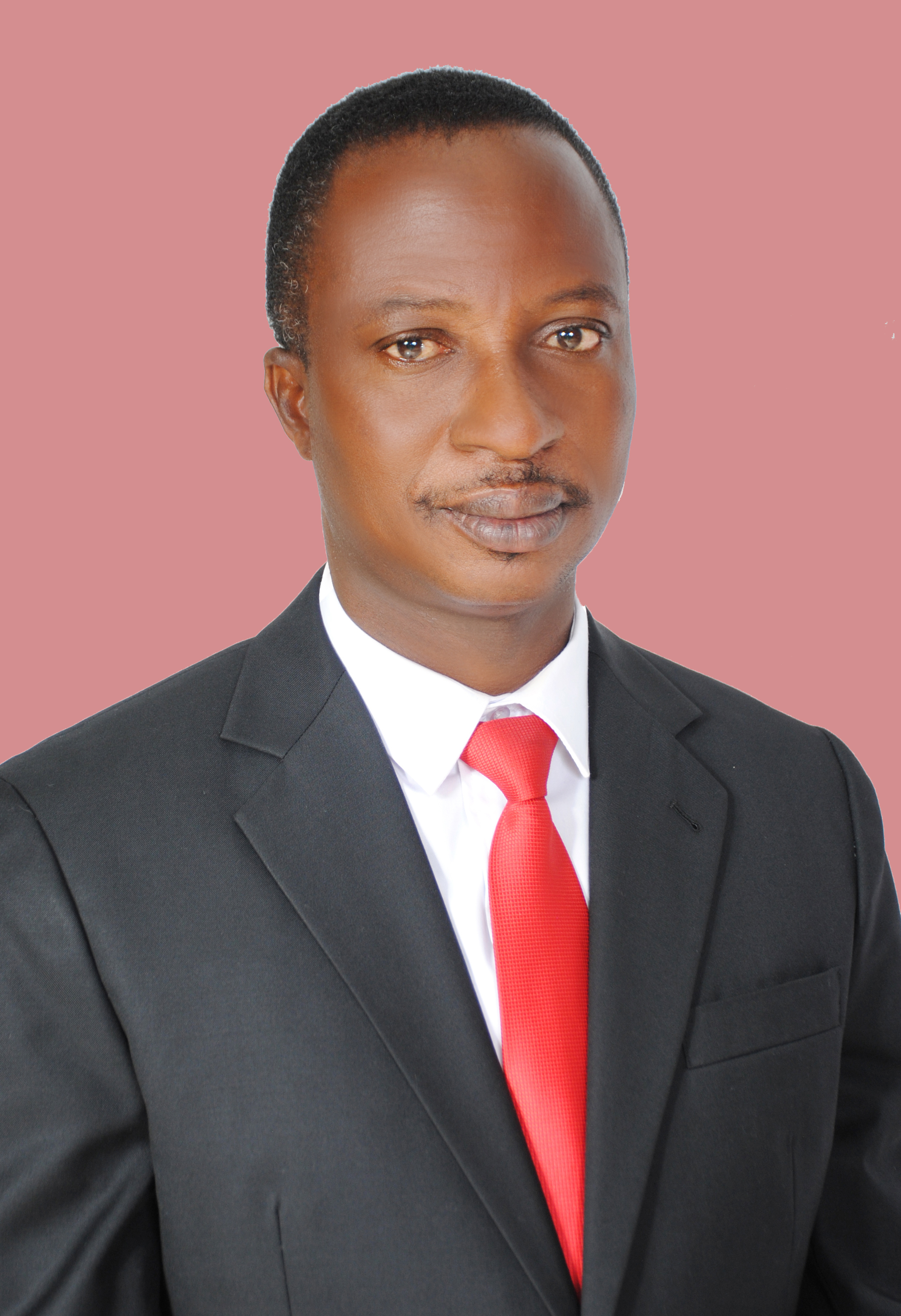
- Member of the 8th parliament of Ghana.

Member of Parliament for Fomena Constituency
- In office 7 January 1996 – 6 January 2009
- President: John Kufuor

Personal details
- Died: 30 November 2006
- Party: New Patriotic Party
- Education: University of Ghana, Kwame Nkrumah University of Science and Technology, Ghana School of Law
- Profession: Educationist

Akwasi Afrifa was a Ghanaian former politician of the Republic of Ghana. He was the Member of Parliament representing Fomena constituency of the Ashanti Region of Ghana in the 2nd, 3rd and 4th Parliament of the 4th Republic of Ghana. He is a member of the New Patriotic Party.

== Early life and education ==
Afrifa was born on September 22, 1958. He was from Kyeaboso-Dompoase in the Ashanti region. He was a product of the University of Ghana (UG). He held a Bachelor of Arts degree in history from the university in 1980. He was also a product of Kwame Nkrumah University of Science and Technology. From there, he acquired a Post Graduate Diploma in Industrial Management in 1989. He was also a graduate the Ghana School of Law, of where he studied law.

== Career ==
Afrifa was an educationist. He was an assistant director and a tutor at the Opoku Ware School

== Political career ==
Afrifa was a member of the New Patriotic Party. He became a member of parliament from January 1997 after emerging winner in the General Election in December 1996. He since then had a run of two more consecutive terms in office. He was the MP for Fomena constituency. He was elected as the member of parliament for this constituency in the second, third and fourth parliament of the fourth Republic of Ghana. He was the Chairman of parliament's committee on Communications from 2001.

== Elections ==
In the year 2000, Afrifa won the general elections as the member of parliament for the Fomena constituency of the Ashanti Region of Ghana. He won on the ticket of the New Patriotic Party. His constituency was a part of the 31 parliamentary seats out of 33 seats won by the New Patriotic Party in that election for the Ashanti Region. The New Patriotic Party won a majority total of 99 parliamentary seats out of 200 seats. Afrifa was elected with 9,389 votes out of 13,255 total valid votes cast. This was equivalent to 71.6% of the total valid votes cast. He was elected over William Kofi Donkor of the National Democratic Congress, Samuel K.A. Agyin of the Convention People's Party, Adansi Gyimah Ernest of the United Ghana Movement, Eric Kofi Owusu of the People's National Convention and Charles K. Amponsaa of the National Reformed Party. These won 2,787, 361, 214, 186 and 167 votes out of the total valid votes cast respectively. These were equivalent to 21.3%, 2.8%, 1.6%, 1.4% and 1.3% respectively of total valid votes cast.

Afrifa was elected as the member of parliament for the Fomena constituency of the Ashanti Region of Ghana for the third time in the 2004 Ghanaian general elections. He won on the ticket of the New Patriotic Party. His constituency was a part of the 36 parliamentary seats out of 39 seats won by the New Patriotic Party in that election for the Ashanti Region. The New Patriotic Party won a majority total of 128 parliamentary seats out of 230 seats. He was elected with 8,207 votes out of 15,528 total valid votes cast. This was equivalent to 52.9% of total valid votes cast. He was elected over John Toku of the National Democratic Congress, Seotah Kobina James of the Convention People's Party, George Kofi Tieku and Ampomah Thomas both independent candidates. These obtained 2,009, 1,146, 4,096 and 70 votes of the total valid votes cast. These were equivalent to 12.9%, 7.4%, 26.4% and 0.5% respectively of total valid votes cast.

== Personal life ==
He was married with 2 children.

== Death ==
He died after a short illness on Thursday, 30 November 2006 in the morning at the 37 Military Hospital in Accra.

== See also ==
- List of MPs elected in the 2004 Ghanaian parliamentary election
