= Samuel Nyimakan =

Ghanaian politician

MP for Wulensi
- In office 7 January 2001 – 6 January 2005
- President: John Agyekum Kufour

Personal details
- Born: Wulensi, Northern Region
- Party: National Democratic Congress
- Occupation: Politician

Samuel Nyimakan is a Ghanaian politician and a member of the Third Parliament of the Fourth representing the Wulensi Constituency in the Northern Region of Ghana.

== Early life and education ==
Samuel was born in Wulensi, a town in the Northern Region of Ghana.

== Politics ==
Samuel was first elected into Parliament on the ticket of the National Democratic Congress during the December 2000 Ghanaian General Elections representing the Wulensi Constituency in the Northern Region of Ghana. He polled 9,537 votes out of the 17,536 valid votes cast representing 54.40%. His constituency was a part of the 16 parliamentary seats out of 21 seats won by the National Democratic Congress in that election for the Northern Region. He was elected over Alhaji Saani Iddi of the New Patriotic Party, Binyam S.Jangboja of the National Reform Party and Ayi Abudu-Rahaman of the Convention Peoples Party. These candidates obtained 6,884, 837and 278 respectively. These were equivalent to 39.30%, 4.80% and 1.60% respectively of total valid votes cast.

Samuel was disqualified to stand as a candidate for election in the Wulensi Constituency in 2003.

== Career ==
Samuel is a former member of Parliament for the Wulensi Constituency in the Northern Region of Ghana from 2001 to 2005.
