= Seth Dankwa Wiafe =

Ghanaian politician

Seth Dankwa

MP for Akwapim South
- In office 7 January 2001 – 6 January 2005
- President: John Agyekum Kufour

Personal details
- Born: Akwapim South, Eastern Region, Ghana
- Party: New Patriotic Party(Ghana)
- Occupation: Politician and Lawyer

Seth Dankwa Wiafe is a Ghanaian Politician and a member of the Third Parliament of the Fourth Republic of Ghana.

== Early life and education ==
Wiafe was born at Akwapim South in the Eastern Region of Ghana. He is a lawyer and member of the General Council Ghana Bar Association.

== Politics ==
Wiafe was first elected into Parliament on the ticket of the National Democratic Congress during the 2000 Ghanaian General Elections representing the Akwapim South Constituency. He was a member of the 3rd parliament of the 4th republic of Ghana.He polled 22,328 votes out the 39,955 valid votes casting representing 55.9%. The National Democratic Congress won a minority total of 92 parliamentary seats out of 200 seats in the 3rd parliament of the 4th republic of Ghana. He was beaten in the 2004 election by Magnus Opare-Asamoah (NPP) 0.70% against 56%. During his political work, Wiafe and his District Chief Executive (DCE), Andrew Y. Nyarko-Adu, were at each other's throat over allegations of bribery and diversion of illegal chain saw timber.

== Career ==
Wiafe is a Former Member of Parliament for the Akwapim South Constituency in the Eastern Region of Ghana from 2001 to 2005.
