= Kingsley Asoah-Apima =

Ghanaian politician

MP for Juabeso
- In office 7 January 1993 – 6 January 1997
- President: Jerry John Rawlings

Personal details
- Born: 15 June 1950 (age 76) Juaboso, Western Region Gold Coast (now Ghana)
- Party: National Democratic Congress
- Education: School of Ghanaian Languages
- Occupation: Politician
- Profession: Teacher

Kingsley Asoah-Apima (born 15 June 1950) is a Ghanaian politician and a member of the first Parliament of the fourth Republic representing the Juabeso constituency in the Western Region of Ghana. He represented the National Democratic Congress.

== Early life and education ==
Asoah-Apima was born on 15 June 1950 at Juaboso in the Western Region of Ghana. He attended the Wiawso Training College and obtained his GCE Ordinary Level. He also attended the School of Ghanaian Languages and obtained his Diploma in Languages.

== Politics ==
He was first elected into Parliament on the Ticket of the National Democratic Congress for the Juaboso Constituency in the Western Region of Ghana during the 1992 Ghanaian General Elections.

== Career ==
He is a teacher by profession and a former member of Parliament for the Juabeso Constituency in the Western Region of Ghana.

== Personal life ==
He is a Christian.
