= Gabriel Yaw Amoah =

Ghanaian politician

Bosome-Freho Constituency
- In office 7 January 1997 – 6 January 2005
- President: John Agyekum Kufour

Personal details
- Born: Bosome Freho, Ashanti Region
- Party: New Patriotic Party
- Occupation: Politician
- Profession: Lawyer

Gabriel Yaw Amoah is a Ghanaian politician and a lawyer. He was a member of the 3rd parliament of the 4th republic of Ghana and a former member of parliament for the Bosome-Freho district as well as the district chief executive of the district.

== Early life and education ==
Amoah was born at Bosome Freho in the Ashanti Region of Ghana.

== Politics ==
Amoah was first elected into parliament on the ticket of the New Patriotic Party during the 1996 Ghanaian General Elections for the Bosome-Freho Constituency in the Ashanti Region of Ghana. He was a member of the 2nd and 3rd parliament of the 4th Republic of Ghana and a politician of the New Patriotic Party. His political career began in 1996 when he contested in the 1996 Ghanaian General Elections as a representative of the Bosome-Freho constituency. He won against the National Democratic Congress candidate, Owusu Pra Ababio with 9,431 making 40% of the total valid votes cast. He contested again in the 2000 Ghanaian General Elections after winning the delegates election and retained his seat with a total of 10,734 making 65% of the total valid votes cast. Gabriel participated again in the 2004 primaries elections but this time around, he lost to another member of the New Patriotic Party. He was appointed the as the district chief executive officer for the district.

== Career ==
Amoah was a lawyer and a former member of parliament for the Bosome-Freho Constituency in the Ashanti Region of Ghana.
