= William Boakye Akoto =

Ghanaian politician

MP for Birim North
- In office 7 January 2001 – 6 January 2005
- President: John Agyekum Kufour

Personal details
- Born: Birim North, Eastern Region
- Party: New Patriotic Party
- Occupation: Politician

William Boakye Akoto is a Ghanaian Politician and a member of the Third Parliament of the Fourth Republic of Ghana representing the Birim North Constituency in the Eastern Region.

== Early life and education ==
Akoto was born at Birim North in the Eastern Region of Ghana. He attended the University of Toronto and obtained his PhD.

== Politics ==
Akoto was first elected into Parliament on the Ticket of the New Patriotic Party during the December 2000 Ghanaian General Elections. He polled 20,577 votes out of the 40,255 valid votes cast representing 51.10%. He was beaten in the Parties primaries elections by Ms. Esther Obeng Dapaah.

== Career ==
Akoto was a former publisher of the African Connection Newspaper in Toronto. He is also a former member of Parliament for the Birim North Constituency in the Eastern Region of Ghana.
