= Nana Asante-Frimpong =

Ghanaian politician

Member of parliament for Kwabre East Constituency
- In office 7 January 2001 – 6 January 2005
- Preceded by: John Kufuor

Member of parliament for Kwabre East Constituency
- In office 7 January 1997 – 6 January 2001
- President: John Jerry Rawlings

Personal details
- Born: Kwabre East Constituency, Ashanti Region Ghana)
- Party: New Patriotic Party
- Occupation: Politician
- Profession: Businessman

Nana Asante Frimpong was a Ghanaian politician who served one term from 2001 to 2007. He was member of the Third parliament of the Fourth republic of Ghana and a former member of parliament for the Kwabre east constituency of the Ashanti Region of Ghana.

== Early life ==
Frimpong was born at Kware East in the Ashanti Region of Ghana.

== Politics ==
He began his political career in 1997 after emerging winner of the 1996 Ghanaian General Elections.. He polled 333,035 votes out of the 45,342 valid votes cast representing 58.80% against Oppong Kyekyeku Kwaku Kaaky an NDC member who polled 10,808 votes, Kwaku Dua-Twum a PNC member who polled 1,499 votes and Abdullah Uthman a PNC member who polled 0 votes.

Frimpong was reelected as a member of the Third parliament of the Fourth Republic of Ghana was elected as member of parliament for the Kwabre Constituency in the Ashanti Region during the 2000 Ghanaian General Election. He won on the ticket of the New Patriotic Party with 41,098 votes representing 80.90% of the total valid votes cast that year. He declared his intention to contest in the 2004 Ghanaian General Elections but he was defeated by Kofi Frimpong in the 2004 parties primary elections. He served only one term as a Parliamentarian.

== Career ==
Frimpong is a former member of Parliament for the Kwabre Constituency in the Ashanti Region of Ghana. He is also a Business Magnate.
