= Trobu-Amasaman =

Constituency in Ghana

- constituency for the Parliament of Ghana
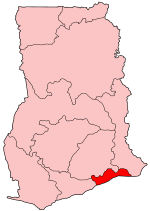
- District: Ga West District
- Region: Greater Accra Region of Ghana

Current constituency
- Created: 2004
- Party: National Democratic Congress
- MP: Ernest Attuquaye Armah

Trobu-Amasaman is one of the constituencies represented in the Parliament of Ghana. It elects one Member of Parliament (MP) by the first past the post system of election. Trobu-Amasaman is located in the Ga West District of the Greater Accra Region of Ghana.

== Members of Parliament ==
Election	Member	Party
2004	Samuel Nee-Aryeetey Attoh	National Democratic Congress
2008	Ernest Attuquaye Armah	National Democratic Congress

== Elections ==
MPs elected in the Ghanaian parliamentary election, 2008:Trobu-Amasaman Source: Ghana Home Page
Party	Candidate	Votes	%	±%
National Democratic Congress	Ernest Attuquaye Armah	34,797	48.8	—
New Patriotic Party	Moses Anim	31,945	44.8	—
Convention People's Party	Thelma Lamptey	3,751	5.3	—
People's National Convention	Lord Owusu Dwemoh	656	0.9	—
Democratic Freedom Party	Nickson Acquaye	124	0.2	—
Majority		3,852	4.0	—
Turnout		—	—	—

== See also ==
- List of Ghana Parliament constituencies
