= Mpohor-Wassa East (Ghana parliament constituency) =

Ghana parliament constituency

- constituency for the Parliament of Ghana
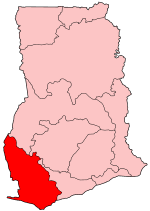
- District: Mpohor/Wassa East District
- Region: Western Region of Ghana

Current constituency
- Party: New Patriotic Party
- MP: Anthony Evans Amoah

Anthony Evans Amoah is the member of parliament for the constituency. He was elected on the ticket of the New Patriotic Party (NPP) won a majority of 1,511 votes to become the MP. He was also the incumbent MP during the 2008 parliamentary elections of Ghana.

== See also ==
- List of Ghana Parliament constituencies

Youth MP for Mpohor Wasa East constituency in United Nation Youth Association-Parliament is HON.EMMANUEL AMOAFUL.
