= National Reform Party (Ghana) =

Political party in Ghana

- Leader: Peter Kpordugbe
- Chairman: Peter Kpordugbe
- General Secretary: Kyeretwie Opoku
- 2000 Presidential Candidate: Goosie Tanoh
- Founded: 1999
- Split from: National Democratic Congress
- Headquarters: 31 Mango Tree Avenue; Asylum Down; Accra
- Motto: Ghana first
- 2004: 0

The National Reform Party is a political party in Ghana. It was founded in 1999 by a splinter group from the National Democratic Congress (NDC).

== Elections ==
The party contested the 2000 presidential and parliamentary elections on the 7 December 2000 but won no seats. Its presidential candidate Augustus Obuadum Tanoh ("Goosie" Tanoh) had 1.1% of the presidential vote. His running mate was Fetus Kosiba.

== Electoral performance ==
=== Parliamentary elections ===
Election	Number of APC votes	Share of votes	Seats	+/-	Position	Outcome of election
2004	11,364	0.13%	0	—	6th of 8	Not represented in parliament
2000	147,196	2.25%	0	—	5th of 6	Not represented in parliament

=== Presidential elections ===
Election	Candidate	Number of votes	Share of votes	Outcome of election
2004	Not contested	—	—	—
2000	Goosie Tanoh	78,629	1.21%	5th of 7

== Officials ==
The chairman and leader of the party is Peter Kpordugbe, former head of the National Service Secretariat and a former member of the NDC. The general secretary is Kyeretwie Opoku.

== Motto ==
The party's motto is "Ghana first".

== See also ==
- List of political parties in Ghana
