= United Ghana Movement =

Political party in Ghana

- Leader: Charles Wereko-Brobby
- Chairman: Nii Armah Tagoe
- General Secretary: Eric Dutenya Kwabla
- Vice-Chairman: Bashiru Alhassan Daballi
- Treasurer: Lawrence Adotey Addo
- Youth Coordinator: Damasus Tuurosong
- Women’s Coordinator: Linda Awuah
- Campaign Coordinator: Prince Aboagye
- Founder: Charles Wereko-Brobby
- Founded: 1992
- Registered: 10 January 1997
- Dissolved: 2007
- Split from: New Patriotic Party
- Headquarters: Accra
- Colours: Blue, white and green
- Slogan: Grooming People for Ghana’s Development

Election symbol
- A clenched fist of the hand with the index and middle fingers raised together

The United Ghana Movement is a political party in Ghana. The founder is Charles Wereko-Brobby, formerly a leading member of the New Patriotic Party.

== Registration ==
The party was officially registered with the Electoral Commission of Ghana as a political party in Ghana on 10 January 1997.

== Electoral performance ==
=== 2000 elections ===
The first general elections the party contested were the presidential and parliamentary elections of December 2000. Charles Wereko-Brobby stood for president on the party's ticket in December 2000 and came seventh with 0.3% of the popular vote. The party also contested the parliamentary elections in the same year but won no seats.

=== Parliamentary elections ===
| Election | Number of UGM votes | Share of votes | Seats | +/- | Position | Outcome of election |
|---|---|---|---|---|---|---|
| 2000 | 32,632 | 0.50% | 0 | — | 6th | Not represented in parliament |

=== Presidential elections ===
| Election | Candidate | Number of votes | Share of votes | Outcome of election |
|---|---|---|---|---|
| 2000 | Charles Wereko-Brobby | 22,123 | 0.34% | 7th of 7 |

== Party on vacation ==
In 2002, the leader of the party, Wereko-Brobby announced that the party is on vacation.

== Symbols ==
The party symbols are as follows:

- Motto - Growing people for Ghana's development.
- Symbol - A clenched fist of the hand with the index and middle fingers raised together.
- Colours - Blue, White and Green

== See also ==
- List of political parties in Ghana
