= 2000 Ghanaian general election =

- Presidential election
- 7 December 2000 (first round); 28 December 2000 (second round)
- Turnout: 61.74% (first round); 60.37% (second round)
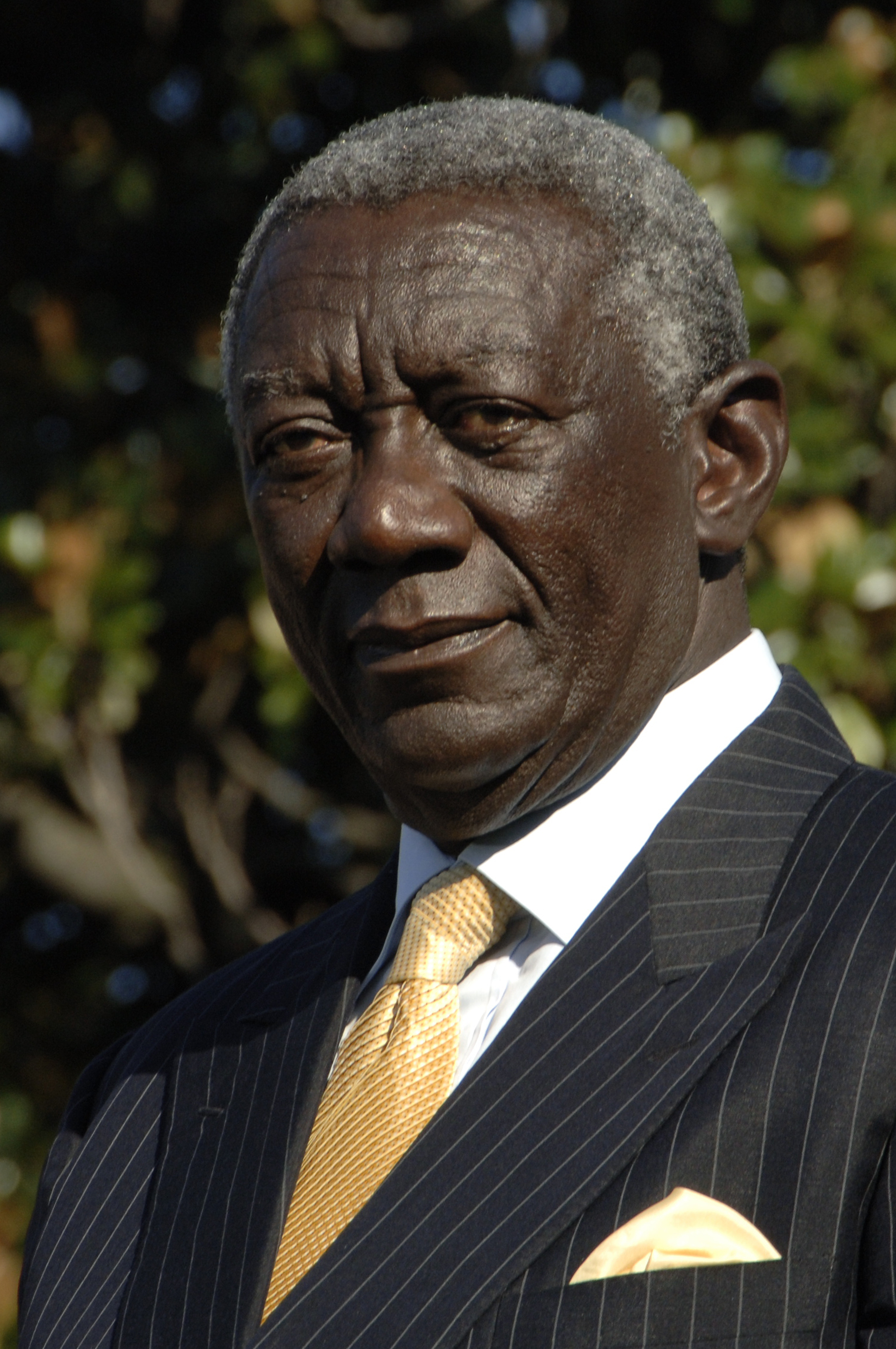

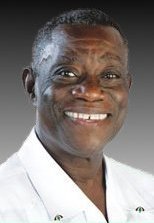
Nominee	John Kufuor	John Atta Mills
Party	NPP	NDC
Running mate	Aliu Mahama	Martin Amidu
Popular vote	3,631,263	2,750,124
Percentage	56.90%	43.10%
President before election
Jerry John Rawlings
NDC
President-elect
John Kufuor
NPP

General elections were held in Ghana on 7 December 2000, with a second round of the presidential election on 28 December.

In the presidential election, John Kufuor of the New Patriotic Party (NPP) led the field in the first round of voting, taking 48 percent of the vote. Vice President John Atta Mills of the National Democratic Congress (NDC) finished second, with 44 percent. Kufuor defeated Atta-Mills in the second round with 57 percent of the vote. The NPP also won the most seats in the parliamentary elections, ending eight years of NDC dominance. However, with 99 of the 200 seats, it was two seats short of a majority.

The elections marked the first peaceful transfer of power via the ballot box in the country's history.

== Results ==
=== President ===
Candidate	Running mate	Party	First round		Second round	
Candidate	Running mate	Party	Votes	%	Votes	%
John Kufuor	Aliu Mahama	New Patriotic Party	3,131,739	48.17	3,631,263	56.90
John Atta Mills	Martin Amidu	National Democratic Congress	2,895,575	44.54	2,750,124	43.10
Edward Mahama	Bannerman Baah Ntim	People's National Convention	189,659	2.92		
George Hagan	Alhaji Ibrahim Mahama	Convention People's Party	115,641	1.78		
Augustus Obuadum Tanoh	Joseph Cletus Korsiba	National Reform Party	78,629	1.21		
Dan Lartey	Ewart Ladzagla	Great Consolidated Popular Party	67,504	1.04		
Charles Wereko-Brobby	Larry Addotey Addo	United Ghana Movement	22,123	0.34		
Total			6,500,870	100.00	6,381,387	100.00
Valid votes			6,500,870	98.42	6,381,387	98.80
Invalid/blank votes			104,214	1.58	77,616	1.20
Total votes			6,605,084	100.00	6,459,003	100.00
Registered voters/turnout			10,698,652	61.74	10,698,652	60.37
Source: Electoral Commission, African Elections Database

=== Parliament ===
Party	Votes	%	Seats	+/–
New Patriotic Party	2,937,386	44.98	99	+38
National Democratic Congress	2,691,515	41.21	92	–41
Convention People's Party	285,643	4.37	1	–4
People's National Convention	224,657	3.44	3	+2
National Reform Party	147,196	2.25	0	New
United Ghana Movement	32,632	0.50	0	New
Every Ghanaian Living Everywhere	730	0.01	0	0
Independents	210,998	3.23	4	+4
Vacant			1	–
Total	6,530,757	100.00	200	0
Valid votes	6,530,757	98.45		
Invalid/blank votes	102,549	1.55		
Total votes	6,633,306	100.00		
Registered voters/turnout	10,698,652	62.00		
Source: Electoral Commission, African Elections Database, Election Passport

The vacant seat was filled by a by-election on 3 January 2001 and won by the NPP.

== See also ==
- List of Ghana Parliament constituencies
- List of MPs elected in the 2000 Ghanaian parliamentary election
