= List of MPs elected in the 2008 Ghanaian parliamentary election =

Colonial Era
1951 Assembly	(election)
1954 Assembly	(election)
1956 Assembly	(election)
First Republic
1957 Parliament	(election)
1965 Parliament	(election)
Second Republic
1969 Parliament	(election)
Third Republic
1979 Parliament	(election)
Fourth Republic
1st Parliament	(1992)
2nd Parliament	(1996)
3rd Parliament	(2000)
4th Parliament	(2004)
5th Parliament	(2008)
6th Parliament	(2012)
7th Parliament	(2016)
8th Parliament	(2020)
9th Parliament	(2024)

The election of Members of Parliament (MPs) to the 5th Parliament of the Fourth Republic was held on 7 December 2008. The Speaker is not an elected member of parliament. There are a total of 230 constituencies in Ghana.

== Current composition ==
Affiliation	Members
National Democratic Congress (NDC)	115
New Patriotic Party (NPP)	108
Independent	4
People's National Convention (PNC)	2
Convention People's Party (CPP)	1
Total	230
Government Majority	1

== List of MPs elected in the general election ==
The following table is a list of MPs elected on 7 December 2008, ordered by region and constituency. The previous MP and previous party column shows the MP and party holding the seat prior to the election.

Table of contents:

Ashanti Region • Brong Ahafo Region • Central Region • Eastern Region • Greater Accra Region
Northern Region • Upper East Region • Upper West Region • Volta Region • Western Region
Postponed polls • Changes • By-elections • Notes and References • See also • External links and sources

=== Ashanti Region - 39 seats ===
Constituency	Elected MP	Elected Party	Majority	Previous MP	Previous Party
Adansi-Asokwa	Kobina Tahir Hammond	NPP	4,440	Kobina Tahir Hammond	NPP
Afigya Sekyere East	Hennric David Yeboah	NPP	23,679	Hennric David Yeboah	NPP
Afigya Sekyere West	Albert Kan-Dapaah	NPP	23,679	Albert Kan-Dapaah	NPP
Ahafo Ano North	Richard Akuoko Adiyiah	NPP	1,388	Kwame Owusu Frimpong	NPP
Ahafo Ano South	Stephen Kwaku Balado Manu	NPP	5,577	Stephen Kwaku Balado Manu	NPP
Akrofuom	Kwabena Appiah-Pinkrah	NPP	4,246	Kwabena Appiah-Pinkrah	NPP
Amansie West	Grace Addo	NPP	28,487	Kofi Krah Mensah	NPP
Asante-Akim North	Kwame Anyimadu-Antwi	NPP	27,005	Kwadwo Baah-Wiredu	NPP
Asante-Akim South	Gifty Ohene-Konadu	NPP	9,995	Gifty Ohene Konadu	NPP
Asawase	Muntaka Mohammed Mabarak	NDC	9,116	Gibril Adamu Mohammed	NDC
Asokwa	Maxwell Kofi Jumah	NPP	21,136	Maxwell Kofi Jumah	NPP
Atwima-Kwanwoma	Kojo Appiah-Kubi	NPP	17,445	Matthew Kwaku Antwi	NPP
Atwima-Mponua	Isaac Kwame Asiamah	NPP	11,140	Isaac Kwame Asiamah	NPP
Atwima-Nwabiagya	Benito Owusu Bio	NPP	32,693	Benito Owusu Bio	NPP
Bantama	Cecilia Abena Dapaah	NPP	29,701	Cecilia Abena Dapaah	NPP
Bekwai	Joseph Osei-Owusu	Independent	26,140	Ignatius Kofi Poku Edusei	NPP
Bosome-Freho	Nana Yaw Edward Ofori-Kuragu	Independent	1,076	Nana Yaw Edward Ofori-Kuragu	NPP
Bosomtwe	Simon Osei Mensah	NPP	15,695	Simon Osei Mensah	NPP
Effiduase-Asokore	Frank Boakye Agyen	NPP	14,403	Grace Coleman	NPP
Ejisu-Juaben	Kwabena Owusu-Aduomi	NPP	46,643	Akwasi Osei-Adjei	NPP
Ejura-Sekyedumase	Issifu Pangabu Mohammed	NDC	2,726	Issifu Pangabu Mohammed	NDC
Fomena	Nana Abu Bonsra	NPP	8,357	Nana Abu Bonsra	NPP
Kumawu	Yaw Baah	NPP	8,097	Yaw Baah	NPP
Kwabre East	Kofi Frimpong	NPP	30,630	Kofi Frempong	NPP
Kwabre West	Emmanuel Asamoah Owusu-Ansah	NPP	23,717	Emmanuel Asamoa Owusu-Ansah	NPP
Kwadaso	Owusu Afriyie Akoto	NPP	39,264	Josephine Hilda Addoh	NPP
Mampong	Francis Addai-Nimoh	NPP	20,472	Peter Abum Sarkodie	NPP
Manhyia	Mathew Opoku Prempeh (Minority Leader)	NPP	48,651	Kwame Addo-Kufuor	NPP
New Edubease	Ernest Kofi Yakah	NDC	2,884	Ernest Kofi Yakah	NDC
Nhyiaeso	Richard Winfred Anane	NPP	27,144	Richard Winfred Anane	NPP
Nsuta-Kwamang-Beposo	Kwame Osei Prempeh	NPP	10,500	Kwame Osei Prempeh	NPP
Obuasi	Edward Michael Ennin	NPP	19,543	Edward Michael Ennin	NPP
Odotobri	Emmanuel Akwasi Gyamfi	NPP	19,768	Emmanuel Akwasi Gyamfi	NPP
Offinso North	Augustine Collins Ntim	NPP	3,014	Kofi Konadu Apraku	NPP
Offinso South	Ben Abdallah Banda	NPP	12,000	Owusu Achaw Duah	NPP
Oforikrom	Elizabeth Agyemang	NPP	19,132	Elizabeth Agyeman	NPP
Old Tafo	Anthony Akoto Osei	NPP	25,785	Anthony Akoto Osei	NPP
Suame	Osei Kyei Mensah Bonsu	NPP	35,493	Osei Kyei Mensah Bonsu	(NPP)
Subin	Isaac Osei	NPP	30,168	Sampson Kwaku Boafo	NPP
=== Brong Ahafo Region - 24 seats ===
Constituency	Elected MP	Elected Party	Majority	Previous MP	Previous Party
Asunafo North	Robert Sarfo-Mensah	NPP	3,093	Robert Sarfo-Mensah	NPP
Asunafo South	George Boakye	NPP	653	Eric Opoku	NDC
Asutifi North	Paul Okoh	NPP	1,327	Paul Okoh	NPP
Asutifi South	Collins Dauda	NDC		Collins Dauda	NDC
Atebubu-Amantin	Emmanuel Owusu-Mainu	NDC	3,395	Emmanuel Owusu Manu	NDC
Berekum	Kwaku Agyenim-Boateng	NPP	2,756	Nkrabeah Effah Dartey	NPP
Dormaa East	Yaw Ntow Ababio	NPP	4,898	Yaw Ntow Ababio	NPP
Dormaa West	Kwaku Agyemang-Manu	NPP	953	Yaw Asiedu-Mensah	NPP
Jaman North	Alexander Asum-Ahensah	NDC	2,983	Alexander Asum-Ahensah	NDC
Jaman South	Yaw Afful	NPP	6,506	Anna Nyamekye	NPP
Kintampo North	Stephen Kunsu	NDC	4,373	Stephen Kunsu	NDC
Kintampo South	Yaw Effah-Baafi	NDC	2,346	Yaw Effah-Baafi	NDC
Nkoranza North	Major. Derrick Oduro	NPP	1,069	Major Derek Oduro	NPP
Nkoranza South	Kwame Aporfo Twumasi	NPP	1,586	Kwame Aporfo Twumasi	NPP
Pru	Masoud Baba Abdul-Rahman	NDC	4,096	Masoud Baba Abdul-Rahman	NDC
Sene	Felix Twumasi-Appiah	NDC	3,598	Felix Twumasi-Appiah	NDC
Sunyani East	Kwasi Ameyaw-Cherimeh	NPP	14,935	Joseph Henry Mensah	NPP
Sunyani West	Ignatius Baffour Awuah	NPP	9,815	Kwadwo Adjei Darko	NPP
Tain	Ahmed Ibrahim	NDC	2,917	Joe Danquah	NPP
Tano North	Ernest Akobuor Debrah	NPP	5,923	Ernest Akobuor Debrah	NPP
Tano South	Andrews Adjei-Yeboah	NPP	2,622	Andrews Adjei-Yeboah	NPP
Techiman North	Christopher Ameyaw-Akumfi	NPP	2,139	Alex Kyeremeh	NDC
Techiman South	Simons Addai	NDC	1,757	Simons Addai	NDC
Wenchi	Prof. George Yaw Gyan-Baffuor	NPP	5,021	Prof. George Yaw Djan-Baffuor	NPP
=== Central Region - 19 seats ===
Constituency	Elected MP	Elected Party	Majority	Previous MP	Previous Party
Abura-Asebu-Kwamankese	Anthony Christian Dadzie	NDC	6,554	Andrew Kingsford Mensah	NPP
Agona East	John Agyabeng	NPP	34	John Agyabeng	NPP
Agona West	Samuel Kweku Obodai	NPP	6,338	Samuel Kweku Obodai	NPP
Ajumako-Enyan-Essiam	Cassiel Ato Forson	NDC	2,925	Isaac Eduasar Edumadze	NPP
Asikuma-Odoben-Brakwa	Paul Collins Appiah-Ofori	NPP	471	Paul Collins Appiah-Ofori	NPP
Assin North	Kennedy Agyapong	NPP	5,347	Ken Ohene Agyapong	NPP
Assin South	Dominic Kwaku Fobih	NPP	2,628	Dominic Kwaku Fobih	NPP
Awutu-Senya	David Nana Larbie	NDC	2,293	Oppey Abbey	NPP
Cape Coast	Ebo Barton-Odro	NDC	7,268	Christine Churcher	NPP
Effutu	Mike Allen Hammah	NDC	13,114	Samuel Owusu Agyei	NPP
Gomoa East	Ekow Panyin Okyere Eduamoah	NDC	5,608	Richard Sam Quarm	NPP
Gomoa West	Francis Kojo Arthur	NDC	3,474	Joe Kingsley Hackman	NPP
Hemang Lower Denkyria	Rev. Benjamin Bimpong Donkor	NPP	476	Rev. Benjamin Bimpong Donkor	NPP
Komenda-Edina-Eguafo-Abirem	Joseph Samuel Annan	NDC	3,458	Paa Kwesi Nduom	CPP
Mfanstsiman East	George Kuntu Blankson	NDC	1,734	George Kuntu Blankson	NDC
Mfantsiman West	Aquinas Tawiah Quansah	NDC	3,176	Stephen Asamoah Boateng	NPP
Twifo-Atti Morkwaa	Elizabeth Amoah Tetteh	NDC	1,415	Elizabeth Amoah Tetteh	NDC
Upper Denkyria East	Nana Amoakoh	NPP	11,422	Nana Amoako	NPP
Upper Denkyria West	Benjamin Kofi Ayeh	NPP	11,422	Benjamin Kofi Ayeh	NPP
=== Eastern Region - 28 seats ===
Constituency	Elected MP	Elected Party	Majority	Previous MP	Previous Party
Abetifi	Peter Wiafe Pepera	NPP	9,724	Eugene Atta Agyepong	NPP
Abirem	Esther Obeng Dapaah	NPP	5,889	Esther Obeng Dapaah	NPP
Aburi-Nsawam	Osei Bonsu Amoah	NPP	12,297	Magnus Opare-Asamoah	NPP
Afram Plains North	Emmanuel Aboagye Didieye	NDC	10,133	Joseph Tsatsu Agbenu	NDC
Afram Plains South	Raphael Kofi Ahaligah	NDC	5,453	Raphael Kofi Ahaligah	NDC
Akim Abuakwa North	Samuel Kwadwo Amoako	NPP	5,046	Joseph Boakye Danquah Adu	NPP
Akim Abuakwa South	Samuel Atta Akyea	NPP	5,066	Nana Addo Dankwa Akufo-Addo	(NPP)
Akim Oda	Yaw Owusu-Boateng	NPP	12,845	Yaw Osafo-Maafo	NPP
Akim Swedru	Joseph Ampomah Bosompem	NPP	8,469	Felix Owusu Adjapong (Majority Leader)	NPP
Akropong	William Ofori Boafo	NPP	9,721	William Ofori Boafo	NPP
Akwatia	Kofi Asare	NPP	2,040	Kiston Akomena Kissi	NPP
Asuogyaman	Joses Asare-Akoto	NDC	1,135	Kofi Osei-Ameyaw	NPP
Atiwa	Kwasi Annoh Ankama	NPP	18,572	Yaw Brempong-Yeboah	NPP
Ayensuano	Samuel Ayeh-Paye	NPP	3,892	Godfred Kwame Otchere	NPP
Fanteakwa	Kwabena Amankwah Asiamah	NPP	5,246	Kwadjo Agyei Addo	NPP
Kade	Ofosu Asamoah	NPP	11,852	Ofosu Asamoah	NPP
Lower Manya	Michael Teye Nyuanu	NDC	4,697	Michael Teye Nyuanu	NDC
Lower West Akim	Gifty Klenam	NPP	8,310	James Appietu-Ankrah	NPP
Mpraeso	Seth Kwame Acheampong	NPP	9,930	Francis Osafo-Mensah	NPP
New Juaben North	Hackman Owusu-Agyeman	NPP	8,819	Hackman Owusu-Agyeman	NPP
New Juaben South	Beatrice Bernice Boateng	NPP	13,561	Yaw Barimah	NPP
Nkawkaw	Seth Adjei Baah	Independent	5,821	Kwabena Adusa Okerchiri	NPP
Ofoase-Ayirebi	David Oppon-Kusi	NPP	6,222	David Oppon-Kusi	NPP
Okere	Dan Botwe	NPP	5,245	Brandford Kwame Daniel Adu	NPP
Suhum	Frederick Opare-Ansah	NPP	1,424	Frederick Opare-Ansah	NPP
Upper Manya	Stephen Amoanor Kwao	NDC	7,759	Stephen Amoanor Kwao	NDC
Upper West Akim	Joseph Sam Amankwanor	NDC	2,948	Samuel Sallas Mensah	NDC
Yilo Krobo	Raymond Tawiah	NDC	4,687	Raymond Tawiah	NDC
=== Greater Accra Region - 27 seats ===
Constituency	Elected MP	Elected Party	Majority	Previous MP	Previous Party
Ablekuma Central	Theophilus Tettey Chaie	NDC	4,074	Victor Okuley Nortey	NPP
Ablekuma North	Justice Joe Appiah	NPP	15,480	Kwamena Bartels	NPP
Ablekuma South	Fritz Baffour	NDC	5,283	Theresa Ameley Tagoe	NPP
Abokobi-Madina	Amadu Bukari Sorogho	NDC	6,705	Amadu Bukari Sorogho	NDC
Ada	Alex Narh Tettey-Enyo	NDC	12,695	Alex Narh Tettey-Enyo	NDC
Adenta	Kojo Adu Asare	NDC	3,584	Kwadjo Opare-Hammond	NPP
Ashaiman	Alfred Kwame Agbesi	NDC	18,943	Alfred Kwame Agbesi	NDC
Ayawaso Central	Sheikh Ibrahim Cudjoe Quaye	NPP	847	Sheikh Ibrahim Cudjoe Quaye	NPP
Ayawaso East	Mustapha Ahmed	NDC	42,053	Mustapha Ahmed	NDC
Ayawaso East Wuogon	Akosua Frema Osei-Opare	NPP	3,099	Akosua Frema Osei-Opare	NPP
Dade Kotopon	Nii Amasah Namoale	NDC	12,601	Nii Amasah Namoale	NDC
Dome Kwabenya	Aaron Michael Oquaye (Second Deputy Speaker)	NPP	11,158	Aaron Michael Oquaye	NPP
Domeabra-Obom	Daoud Anum Yemoh	NDC	7,966	Daoud Anum Yemoh	NDC
Korle Klottey	Nii Armah Ashietey	NDC	2,622	Nii Adu Daku Mante	NPP
Kpone-Katamanso	Joseph Nii Laryea Afotey Agbo	NDC	10,029	Joseph Nii Laryea Afotey Agbo	NDC
Krowor	Nii Oakley Quaye-Kumah	NDC	6,203	Abraham Laryea Odai	NPP
Ledzokuku	Nii Nortey Duah	NDC	11,465	Gladys Nortey Ashitey	NPP
Ningo-Prampram	Enoch Teye Mensah	NDC	12,143	Enoch Teye Mensah	NDC
Odododiodio	Jonathan Nii Tackie Komey	NDC	9,317	Jonathan Nii Tackie Komey	NDC
Okaikwei North	Elizabeth K. T. Sackey	NPP	2,832	Elizabeth Kwatsoe Tawiah Sackey	NPP
Okaikwei South	Nana Akomea	NPP	10,000	Nana Akomea	NPP
Sege	Alfred Wallace Gbordzor Abayateye	NDC	12,695	Alfred Wallace Gbordzor Abayateye	NDC
Shai-Osudoku	David Tetteh Assumeng	NDC	9,126	David Tetteh Assumeng	NDC
Tema East	Samuel Evans Ashong Narh	NPP	7,433	Ishmael Ashitey	NPP
Tema West	Irene Naa Torshie Addo	NPP	8,642	Abraham Osei-Aidooh	NPP
Trobu-Amasaman	Ernest Attuquaye Armah	NDC	2,852	Samuel Nee-Aryeetey Attoh	NPP
Weija	Shirley Ayorkor Botchway	NPP	11,410	Shirley Ayorkor Botchwey	NPP
=== Northern Region - 26 seats ===
Constituency	Elected MP	Elected Party	Majority	Previous MP	Previous Party
Bimbilla	Dominic Aduna Bingab Nitiwul	NPP	11,910	Mohammed Ibn Abass	NDC
Bole	Joseph Akati Saaka	NDC	5,668	John Dramani Mahama	NDC
Bunkpurugu-Yunyoo	Duut Emmanuel Kwame	NDC	2,405	Joseph Yaani Labik	Independent
Chereponi	Doris Asibi Seidu	NPP	1,540	Doris Asibi Seidu	NPP
Damango-Daboya	Sammy B. Wusah	NDC	2,454	Alex Seidu Sofo	NPP
Gushiegu	Thomas Kwesi Nasah	NDC	697	Rita Tani Iddi	NPP
Karaga	Iddrisu Dawuda	NDC	3,578	Iddrisu Dawuda	NDC
Kpandai	Lipkalimor Kwajo Tawiah	NDC	552	Lipkalimor Kwajo Tawiah	NDC
Kumbungu	Imoro Yakubu Kakpagu	NDC	12,059	Yakubu K. Imoro	NDC
Mion	Ahmed Alhassan Yakubu	NDC	85	Ahmed Alhassan Yakubu	NDC
Nalerigu	Tia Alfred Sugri	NDC	4,006	Hajia Alima Mahama	NPP
Nanton	Iddrisu Abdul-Kareem	NPP	691	Alhassan Yakubu	NDC
Saboba	Bukari Nikpe Joseph	NDC	1,387	Charles Binipom Bintin	NPP
Salaga	Ibrahim Dey Abubakari	NDC	3,046	Abubakar Boniface Siddique	NPP
Savelugu	Hajia. Mary Salifu Boforo	NDC	6,434	Hajia Mary Salifu Boforo	NDC
Sawla-Tuna-Kalba	Donald Dari Soditey	NDC	4,222	Donald Dari Saditey	NDC
Tamale Central	Inusah Fuseini	NDC	21,142	Inusah Fuseini	NDC
Tamale North	Abubakari Sumani	NDC	19,873	Abubakari Sumani	NDC
Tamale South	Haruna Iddrisu	NDC	32,976	Haruna Iddrisu	NDC
Tolon	Umar Abdul-Razak	NDC	654	Umar Abdul-Razak	NDC
Walewale (East) (formerly West Mamprusi)	Iddrisu Zakari Alidu	NDC	1,011	Iddrisu Zakari Alidu	NDC
Wulensi	Saani Iddi	Independent	1,636	Kofi Karim Wumbei	NPP
Yagaba-Kubori (Walewale West)	Abdul-Rauf Tanko Ibrahim	NDC	1,330	Abdul-Rauf Tanko Ibrahim	NDC
Yapei-Kusawgu	Amadu Seidu	NDC	145	Seidu Amadu	NDC
Yendi	Sulemana Ibun Iddrisu	NDC	617	Malik Al-Hassan Yakubu (Second Deputy Speaker)	NPP
Zabzugu-Tatale	Jabaah John Bennam	NPP	6,654	Mohammed Jagri	NDC
=== Upper East Region - 13 seats ===
Constituency	Elected MP	Elected Party	Majority	Previous MP	Previous Party
Bawku Central	Adamu Dramani	NPP	2,772	Mahama Ayariga	NDC
Binduri	Stephen Yakubu	NPP	746	Mark Anthony Awuni	NDC
Bolgatanga	Akolbire Emmanuel Opam-Brown	NDC	18,593	David Apasara	NDC
Bongo	Albert Abongo	NDC	7,256	Albert Abongo	NDC
Builsa North	Timothy Awotiirim Ataboadey	NDC	1,271	Agnes A. Chigabatia	NPP
Builsa South	Alhassan Azong	PNC	59	Abolimbisa Roger Akantagriwen	NDC
Chiana-Paga	Allowe Leo Kabah	NPP	943	Pele Tumbakura Abugu	NDC
Garu - Tempane	Dominic Azimbe Azumah	NDC	668	Dominic Azimbe Azumah	NDC
Nabdam	Moses Aduku Asaga	NDC	272	Moses Aduku Asaga	NDC
Navrongo Central	Joseph Kofi Adda	NPP	1,130	Joseph Kofi Adda	NPP
Pusiga	Simon Atingban Akunye	NDC	3,782	Simon Atingban Akunye	NDC
Talensi	John Akologu Tia	NDC	2,079	John Akologu Tia	NDC
Zebilla	Cletus Apul Avoka (Majority Leader)	NDC	2,504	John Akparibo Ndebugre	PNC
=== Upper West Region - 10 seats ===
Constituency	Elected MP	Elected Party	Majority	Previous MP	Previous Party
Jirapa	Edward Salia	NDC	12,636	Edward Salia	NDC
Lambussie	John Duoghr Baloroo	NPP	1,797	Alice Teni Boon	NDC
Lawra-Nandom	Ambrose P. Dery	NPP	1,540	Benjamin Bewa-Nyog Kunbuor	NDC
Nadowli East	Puozaa Mathias Asuma	NDC	4,113	Mathias Asoma Puozaa	NDC
Nadowli West	Alban Sumana Kingsford Bagbin (Majority Leader)	NDC	9,266	Alban Sumana Kingsford Bagbin (Minority Leader)	NDC
Sissala East	Alhassan Dubie Halutie	NDC	217	Moses Dani Baah	PNC
Sissala West	Haruna Bayirga	PNC	649	Haruna Bayirga	PNC
Wa Central	Abdul-Rashid Hassan Pelpuo	NDC	7,871	Abdul-Rashid Hassan Pelpuo	NDC
Wa East	Godfrey Tangu Bayon	NPP	1,010	Issahaku Salia	NDC
Wa West	Joseph Yieleh Chireh	NDC	4,927	Joseph Yieleh Chireh	NDC
=== Volta Region - 22 seats ===
Constituency	Elected MP	Elected Party	Majority	Previous MP	Previous Party
Akan	Joseph Kwadwo Ofori	NDC	5,741	John Kwadjo Gyampong	NDC
Anlo	Clement Kofi Humado	NDC	27,824	Clement Kofi Humado	NDC
Avenor-Ave	Edward Korbly Doe Adjaho (First Deputy Speaker)	NDC	16,867	Edward Korbly Doe Adjaho	NDC
Biakoye	Emmanuel Kwasi Bandua	NDC	7,947	Emmanuel Kwasi Bandua	NDC
Buem	Henry Ford Kamel	NDC	7,426	Henry Ford Kamel	NDC
Central Tongu	Joe Kwashie Gidisu	NDC	12,488	Joe Kwashie Gidisu	NDC
Ho Central	George Kofi Nfodjoh	NDC	40,808	George Kofi Nfodjoh	NDC
Ho East	Juliana Azumah-Mensah	NDC	3,856	Juliana Azumah-Mensah	NDC
Ho West	Emmanuel Kwasi Bedzrah	NDC	21,451	Francis Aggrey Agbotse	NDC
Hohoe North	Prince Jacob Hayibor	NDC	19,945	Prince Jacob Hayibor	NDC
Hohoe South	Joseph Zaphenat Amenowode	NDC	19,851	Joseph Zaphenat Amenowode	NDC
Keta	Richard Lassey Agbenyefia	NDC	25,672	Dan Kwasi Abodakpi	NDC
Ketu North	James Klutse Avedzi	NDC	13,230	James Klutse Avedzi	NDC
Ketu South	Albert Kwasi Zigah	NDC	51,274	Albert Kwasi Zigah	NDC
Krachi East	Wisdom Gidisu	NDC	4,177	Wisdom Gidisu	NDC
Krachi West	Francis Y. Osei Sarfo	NDC	3,792	Francis Y. Osei Sarfo	NDC
Nkwanta North	Joseph K. Nayan	NPP	746	Joseph K. Nayan	NPP
Nkwanta South	Gershon Kofi Bediako Gbediame	NDC	5,900	Gershon Kofi Bediako Gbediame	NDC
North Dayi	Akua Sena Dansua	NDC	27,108	Akua Sena Dansua	NDC
North Tongu	Charles Hodogbey	NDC	18,811	Charles Hodogbey	NDC
South Dayi	Simon Edem Asimah	NDC	12,283	Daniel Kwame Ampofo	NDC
South Tongu	Woyome Kobla Mensah	NDC	25,518	Kenneth Dzirasah	NDC
=== Western Region - 22 seats ===
Constituency	Elected MP	Elected Party	Majority	Previous MP	Previous Party
Ahanta West	Samuel Johnfiah	NPP	11,478	Samuel Johnfiah	NPP
Amenfi Central	George Kofi Arthur	NDC	1,751	George Kofi Arthur	NDC
Amenfi East	Joseph Baiden-Aidoo	NPP	2,333	Joseph Baiden-Aidoo	NPP
Amenfi West	John Gyetuah	NDC	5,313	John Gyetuah	NDC
Aowin	Mathias Kwame Ntow	NDC	3,898	Samuel Adu Gyamfi	NPP
Bia	Michael Coffie Boampong	NDC	14,605	Michael Coffie Boampong	NDC
Bibiani-Anhwiaso-Bekwai	Christopher Addae	NPP	2,227	Christopher Addae	NPP
Effia-Kwesimintsim	Joe Baidoo-Ansah	NPP	14,041	Joe Baidoo-Ansah	NPP
Ellembelle	Emmanuel Armah Kofi Buah	NDC	1,649	Frederick Worsemao Armah Blay (First Deputy Speaker)	CPP
Essikado-Ketan	Joe Ghartey	NPP	8,662	Joe Ghartey	NPP
Evalue Gwira	Catherine Afeku	NPP	11,671	Kojo Armah	CPP
Jomoro	Samia Nkrumah	CPP	16,571	Lee Ocran	NDC
Juabeso	Sampson Ahi	NDC	17,619	Sampson Ahi	NDC
Mpohor-Wassa East	Anthony Evans Amoah	NPP	1,511	Anthony Evans Amoah	NPP
Prestea-Huni Valley	Francis Adu-Blay Koffie	NDC	3,810	Albert Kwaku Obbin	NPP
Sefwi-Akontombra	Herod Cobbina	NDC	2,316	Herod Cobbina	NDC
Sefwi-Wiawso	Paul Evans Aidoo	NDC	750	Paul Evans Aidoo	NDC
Sekondi	Papa Owusu-Ankomah	NPP	3,427	Papa Owusu-Ankomah	NPP
Shama	Gabriel Kodwo Essilfie	NDC	806	Angelina Baiden-Amissah	NPP
Suaman	Stephen Michael Essuah Kofi Ackah	NDC	758	Stephen Michael Essuah Kofi Ackah	NDC
Takoradi	Kwabena Okyere Darko-Mensah	NPP	11,043	Gladys Asmah	NPP
Tarkwa-Nsuaem	Mrs. Gifty Eugenia Kusi	NPP	11,014	Gifty Eugenia Kusi	NPP

== Postponed polls ==
- Parliamentary elections in the Akwatia constituencies had problems and were therefore deferred. The Supreme Court of Ghana ordered that the election be re-run in six polling stations. Following this, the collated results made Kofi Asare of the NPP the duly elected MP for the constituency.
- Results for the Asutifi South were deferred but confirmed later with Collins Dauda being sworn in.

== Changes ==
- The MP for Kwabre West, Emmanuel Owusu-Ansah died on Friday 22 June 2012 after a short illness.
- The MP for Bawku Central, Adamu Dramani Sakande was jailed for 2 years by the Supreme Court of Ghana for forgery on 27 July 2012. This follows a case brought in the High court by Mr Sumaila Biebel, a cattle dealer in 2009 stating that Dramani did not qualify to be an MP as he held both a British and a Burkinabé passport.
- Henry Ford Kamel, MP for Buem and Minister for the Volta Region in the Mahama NDC government died on 25 December 2012 at the Military Hospital in Accra following complications related to diabetes.

== By-elections ==
- Jirapa constituency - 7 April 2009 - Edward Salia NDC died after a period of illness necessitating this by-election. Francis Bawaana Dakurah of the NDC won the seat with a majority of 9,337 (59.0%) beating the NPP candidate and immediate past District Chief Executive, Justin Bayelah Dakurah to second place.
- Chereponi constituency - 29 September 2009 - Doris Asibi Seidu died on 31 July 2009 after an illness. The Electoral Commission of Ghana organised a by-election for 29 September 2009. Samuel Abdulai Jabanyite (NDC) was declared the winner and duly elected MP.
- Atiwa constituency - 31 August 2010 - A by-election was scheduled for 31 August 2010 following the death of Kwasi Annoh Ankama, NPP MP for Atiwa. He died during a trip to London. Kwesi Amoako Atta also of the NPP, won the seat with a vote of 20,282 (75%). This gave him a majority of 14,092 (52.1%).
- Wulensi constituency - 31 July 2012 - Following the death of the independent MP Saani Iddi in early June, the Electoral Commission of Ghana set the above date for a by-election following registration of candidates on 3 July and 4 July 2012. All four contesting parties won an injunction in court to postpone the by-election as they wanted the Electoral Commission of Ghana to use the new voters' register which was being finalised rather than the old register used in previous elections.
- Kwabre West constituency - The by-election planned for 14 August 2012 was postponed following a court order.

== See also ==
- 2008 Ghanaian parliamentary election
- Parliament of Ghana
- Joyce Bamford-Addo - Speaker of the 5th parliament of the 4th Republic.
