= John Gyetuah =

Ghanaian politician (1959–2015)

- Succeeded by: Thomas Charlie Brown

MP for Amenfi West
- In office 7 January 2009 – 6 January 2013
- President: John Evans Atta Mills

Personal details
- Born: 1 October 1959 (age 67)
- Died: 13 October 2015 37 Military Hospital
- Party: National Democratic Congress
- Children: 7
- Education: University of Cape Coast, GIMPA
- Occupation: Politician
- Profession: Educationist

John Gyetuah was a Ghanaian politician who served as a member of parliament for Amenfi West constituency in the Western region of Ghana.

== Early life and education ==
John was born on 1 October 1959 in Asankran Breman in the Western region of Ghana. He obtained BA in Sociology from University of Cape Coast in 2004. He further graduated with EMGL from GIMPA in 2008.

== Career ==
He was an Educationist and was a Senior Superintendent of Ghana Education Service.

== Politics ==
He was a member of National Democratic Congress. He was the member of parliament for Amenfi West constituency for the 5th parliament of the 4th republic of Ghana. He was elected in the 2008 Ghanaian general elections with 18,383 votes out of the 31,858 valid votes cast = 57.7%. He was elected over Agnes Sonful of the New Patriotic Party and Anthony Kwame Annimil of the Convention People's Party. These obtained 41.03% and 1.27% respectively of total valid votes cast. In 2010 he was Minister of State in the John Atta Mills government. He was a member of the Committee on Members Holding Offices of Profit and Roads and Transport. He was the former Deputy Minister for Trade and Industry and later became a minister of State at the Prseidency during President Atta-Mills' tenure.

== Personal life ==
He was married to Veronica Gyetuah and they had seven children. He was a Christian and a member of Methodist church.

== Death ==
He died on 13 October 2015 while a Member of Parliament for the Amenfi West constituency in the 6th parliament of the 4th republic of Ghana.
