= Kwame Amporfo Twumasi =

Ghanaian politician

Hon. Kwame Amporfo Twumasi

Member of Parliament for Nkoranza South Constituency
- In office 7 January 2009 – 6 January 2013
- President: John Atta Mills; John Mahama
- Succeeded by: Emmanuel Kwadwo Agyekum

Member of Parliament for Nkoranza South Constituency
- In office 7 January 2005 – 6 January 2009
- President: John Kufuor
- Preceded by: Hayford Francis Amoako

Personal details
- Born: 10 December 1954 (age 71)
- Party: New Patriotic Party
- Children: 5
- Education: University of Cape Coast
- Profession: Educationist

Kwame Amporfo Twumasi (born 10 December 1954) is a Ghanaian educationist and politician. He was the member of parliament for the Nkoranza South Constituency in Brong Ahafo region in Ghana.

== Early life and education ==
Twumasi was born on 10 December 1954. His hometown is Nkwabeng in the formerly Brong Ahafo Region of Ghana. He had his BA in Geography and Economics from the University of Ghana in 1980. He further had his PGDE from University of Cape Coast in 1996.

== Career ==
Before his election into parliamentary position, he worked with the Ghana Education Service(GES) as a Principal Superintendent and Tutor first at Atebubu Secondary School and later at Nkoranza Secondary/Technical School. He also served as the Deputy Minister of Energy and served in a number of committees. He sojourned as a teacher from September 1981 to August 1987 with the Sokoto State Government in Nigeria under a contract.

== Politics ==
Ampofo was elected in the 2004 parliamentary election held on 7 December 2004, on the ticket of the New Patriotic Party, as the Member of Parliament for the Nkoranza South Constituency. He thus became part of the Members of Parliament elected for the Fourth Parliament of the Fourth Republic of Ghana.

Ampofo oust the then member of parliament from the largest opposition National Democratic Congress by his election in the 2004 Ghanaian general elections. He was elected with 17,655 votes out of 33,513 total valid votes cast. This was equivalent to 52.7% of total valid votes cast. He was elected over James Opoku-Worae, the new candidate from the camp of the National Democratic Congress for that election; and Victor Boah of the Democratic People's Party. These obtained 15,521 and 337 votes respectively. These were equivalent to 46.30% and 1.00% respectively of total valid votes cast. Ampofo was elected on the ticket of the New Patriotic Party. The electorates for the constituency in that elections exhibited a ‘skirt and blouse’ voting system as the winner for the presidential position from that constituency was on the ticket for the opposition National Democratic Congress. The New Patriotic Party however had 14 out of 24 parliamentary seats in that elections for the Brong Ahafo region. In all, the New Patriotic Party won a majority 128 parliamentary representation out of 230 seats in the 4th parliament of the 4th parliament of Ghana.

He maintained his seat for the Nkoranza South constituency for the 5th parliament of the 4th republic of Ghana after the 2008 Ghanaian general elections. He obtained 17,531votes of 33,766 total valid votes cast, equivalent to 51.92% of the total valid votes cast. He won against Emmanuel Kwadwo Agyekum of the National Democratic Congress, Yaw Adjei Donyina of the Democratic People's Party and Kwesi Appiah Bekoe of the Convention People's Party. These obtained 47.22%, 0.27% and 0.59% respectively of the total valid votes cast in the 2008 Ghanaian general elections.

== Personal life ==
Ampofo is married with five children. He is a Christian and fellowships with the Catholic Church.
