= Benjamin Bimpong Donkor =

Ghanaian politician (born 1959)

Hon. Benjamin Bimpong Donkor

Member of Parliament for Hemang Lower Denkyira Constituency
- In office 7 January 2009 – 6 January 2013
- President: John Atta Mills; John Mahama
- Succeeded by: Foster Joseph Andoh

Member of Parliament for Hemang Lower Denkyira Constituency
- In office 7 January 2005 – 6 January 2009
- President: John Kufuor
- Preceded by: New Constituency

Personal details
- Born: 7 July 1959 (age 67)
- Party: New Patriotic Party
- Children: 5
- Education: Heritage Bible Institute
- Profession: Pastor

Benjamin Bimpong Donkor (born 7 July 1959) is a Ghanaian politician and a reverend minister. He was a member of parliament for the Hemang Lower Denkyira constituency from 7 January 2005 to 6 January 2013.

== Early life and education ==
Donkor hails from Jukwa-Mfuom in the Central Region of Ghana. He was born on 7 July 1959. He obtained his Diploma in Biblical Studies from the Heritage Bible Institute in 1998.

== Career ==
Donkor is a reverend minister. He is the pastor for Springs of Life Chapel International.

== Politics ==
Donkor was a member of parliament for the Hemang Lower Denkyira constituency from 7 January 2005 to 6 January 2013 on the ticket of the New Patriotic Party. During the 2008 Ghanaian parliamentary election, he polled 7,067 votes out of a total of 20,024 valid votes cast.

=== 2004 Elections ===
Donkor was elected as the Member of parliament for the Hemang Lower Denkyira constituency in the 2004 Ghanaian General elections. Thus he represented the constituency for the first time in the 4th parliament of the 4th republic of Ghana. He was elected with 12,410votes out of 20,057total valid votes cast. This was equivalent to 61.9% of the total valid votes cast. He was elected over the only other candidate in that elections Peter Bright Amankrah of the National Democratic Congress. He obtained 38.1% of the total valid votes cast. Donkor was elected on the ticket of the New Patriotic Party. His constituency was a part of the 16 constituencies won by the New Patriotic Party in the Central region in that elections. In all, the New Patriotic Party won a total 128 parliamentary seats in the 4th parliament of the 4th republic of Ghana.

=== 2008 Elections ===
Donkor was re-elected as the Member of parliament for the Hemang Lower Denkyira constituency in the 2008 Ghanaian General elections. He thus represented the constituency for the second time in the 5th parliament of the 4th republic of Ghana. He was elected with 7,067votes out of 20,024 total valid votes cast. This was equivalent to 35.29% of the total valid votes cast. He was elected over Godfred Appiah of the People's National Convention, Foster Joseph Andoh of the National Democratic Congress, Osei Heyman of the Convention People's Party and Bright Wireko-Brobby an independent candidate. These obtained 1.17%, 28.46%, 2.16% and 32.92% of the total valid votes cast respectively. Donkor was re-elected on the ticket of the New Patriotic Party. His constituency was a part of 8constituencies won by the New Patriotic Party in the Central region in that elections. In all, the New Patriotic Party won a total 107 parliamentary seats in the 5th parliament of the 4th republic of Ghana.

== Personal life ==
Donkor is married with five children. He is a Christian and a member of the Springs of Life Chapel International.
