= Masoud Baba Abdul-Rahman =

Ghanaian politician

Hon. Masoud Baba Abdul-Rahman

Member of Parliament for Pru Constituency
- In office 7 January 2009 – 6 January 2013
- President: John Atta Mills; John Mahama

Member of Parliament for Pru Constituency
- In office 7 January 2005 – 6 January 2009
- President: John Kufuor

Personal details
- Born: 4 December 1952 (age 73)
- Party: National Democratic Congress
- Children: 5
- Education: University of Cape Coast
- Profession: Educationist

Masoud Baba Abdul-Rahman is a Ghanaian politician who served as the member of parliament for the Pru constituency.

== Early life and education ==
Abdul-Rahman was born on 4 December 1952. He hails from Yeji in the Brong Ahafo region of Ghana. He had his Bachelor of Science in Botany and Diploma in Education from the University of Cape Coast in 1979.

== Career ==
He is an educationist. He was the Deputy Director at Ruyan Consult and Future Leaders Academy.

== Politics ==
=== 2004 elections ===
Abdul-Rahman was first elected as the member of parliament for the Pru constituency in the 2004 Ghanaian general elections. He thus represented the constituency for the first time in the 4th parliament of the 4th republic of Ghana. He was elected with 22,080 votes out of 34,969 valid votes cast. This was equivalent to 63.10% of all total valid votes cast. He was elected over Amoah King David of the New Patriotic Party, Francis Dorkose Dawuda of the People's National Convention and Kingsley K. A. Abonkrah an independent candidate. These obtained 12,029, 555 and 305 votes respectively. These were equivalent to 34.40%, 1.6% and 0.9% of respectively of total valid votes cast. Abdul-Rahman was elected on the ticket of the National Democratic Congress. His constituency was a part of the 10 parliamentary seats out of a total 24 parliamentary seats won by the National Democratic Party for the Brong Ahafo Region. The National Democratic Congress won a minority of 94 parliamentary seats out of 230 seats in that election for the members of parliament for the 4th parliament of the 4th republic of Ghana.

Abdul-Rahman was re-elected on the ticket of the National Democratic Congress (NDC) and won a majority of 4,096 votes to become the MP. He was elected as the Member of parliament for the Pru constituency in the 5th parliament of the 4th republic of Ghana. He was elected with 13,090 votes out of the 31,063 valid votes cast, equivalent to 42.1% of total valid votes cast. He was elected over Alhaji Gariba Iddrisu of the New Patriotic Party, Bijabi Joses of the Democratic Freedom Party, Ponada Donkor George Evans of the Democratic People's Party, Ebenezer Agben of the Convention People's Party and Amoah King David an independent candidate. These obtained 28.95%, 0.82%, 1.03%, 0.45% and 26.61% respectively of the total valid votes cast. He was elected in the 2008 Ghanaian general elections.

== Personal life ==
Abdul-Rahman is married with five children. He is a Muslim.

== See also ==
- List of Ghana Parliament constituencies
