= Timothy Ataboadey Awotiirim =

Ghanaian politician

Timothy Ataboadey Awontirim (born July 1, 1970) is a Ghanaian politician and educationist. He also served as the Member of Parliament for the Builsa North constituency in the Upper East Region of Ghana.

== Early life and education ==
Awotiirim was born on July 1, 1970, in Wiaga, Upper East Region. He obtained a Bachelor of Arts degree in Geography and Resource Development at the University of Ghana in 2000.

== Politics ==
Awotiirim was a member of the Fifth Parliament of the Fourth Republic of Ghana elected on the ticket of the National Democratic Congress (NDC) during the December 2008 Ghanaian general election as the member of Parliament for the Builsa North (Ghana parliament constituency). He defeated Agnes A. Chigabatia of New Patriotic Party (NPP) and two others to win the Builsa North parliamentary seat. The one-term MP polled 8,259 votes out of the 19,165 valid votes cast = 43.1%. James Agalga defeated him on 2012 to take the Builsa North parliamentary seat. On General News of 8 December 2017 he stated "Educated people more corrupt than illiterates".

== Career ==
Prior to his appointment as Member of Parliament, He worked as an Investigator at the Commission on Human Rights and Administrative Justice (CHRAJ) from 1994 to 2004. He also worked as a tutor of Christ the King JSS, Chiana.

== Personal life ==
Awotiirim is a Catholic Christian. He is married with two children.
