= Raphael Kofi Ahaligah =

Ghanaian politician

Hon. Raphael Kofi Ahaligah

Member of Parliament for Afram Plains South Constituency
- In office 7 January 2009 – 6 January 2013
- President: John Atta Mills; John Mahama
- Succeeded by: Joseph Appiah Boateng

Member of Parliament for Afram Plains South Constituency
- In office 7 January 2005 – 6 January 2009
- President: John Kufuor
- Succeeded by: Kwakye Addo

Personal details
- Born: 1 January 1945 (age 81)
- Party: National Democratic Congress
- Education: Kadjebi L/A Middle School
- Profession: Farmer

Raphael Kofi Ahaligah (1 January 1945) is a Ghanaian politician. He was a member of the Fifth Parliament of the Fourth Republic of Ghana.

== Early life and education ==
Ahaligah was born on 1 January 1945. He hails from Nogokpo in the Volta Region of Ghana. He obtained a Middle School Leaver's Certificate in 1963. He attended Kadjebi L/A Middle School.

== Career ==
He is a farmer and Agriculturalist by profession.

== Political life ==
He is a member of the National Democratic Congress (NDC). He was a member of parliament for the Afram Plains South seat from 2004 to 2008. In December 2008 Ghanaian general Elections, he won the Afram Plains South seat by polling 12132 summing up to 63.7% out of a 100% votes cast. He was the Member of Parliament for the Afram Plains South constituency seat from 2008 to 2012.

=== 2004 Elections ===
Ahaligah was first elected as the member of parliament for the Afram Plains South constituency in the 2004 Ghanaian general elections. He thus represented the constituency in the fourth parliament of the fourth republic of Ghana. He was elected with 13,312 votes out of 22,385 total valid votes cast. This was equivalent to 60.8% of the total valid votes cast. He was elected over Anthony Adongo of the New Patriotic Party. He obtained 8,773 votes out of the total valid votes cast, equivalent to 39.2% of the total valid votes cast. Ahaligah was elected on the ticket of the National Democratic Congress. His constituency was a part of the 22 constituencies won by the National Democratic Congress in the Greater Accra region in that elections. In all, the National Democratic Congress won a total 94 parliamentary seats in the fourth parliament of the fourth republic of Ghana.

== Personal life ==
Ahaligah is married and has ten children. He is a Christian and a member of the catholic church.
