= Iddrisu Zakari Alidu =

Ghanaian politician and an MP

- Succeeded by: Sagre Bambangi

MP for Walewale
- In office 7 January 2009 – 7 January 2013
- President: John Evans Atta Mills

Personal details
- Born: 6 March 1956 (age 70) Janga, Northern Region (Ghana) Gold Coast (now Ghana)
- Party: National Democratic Congress
- Children: 9
- Education: University of Education, Winneba,
- Occupation: Politician
- Profession: Teacher

Iddrisu Zakari Alidu is a Ghanaian politician and an MP for Walewale. He is a member of the National Democratic Congress.(NDC).

== Early life and education ==
Zakari was born on 6 March 1956 in Janga his hometown in the Northern Region of Ghana. He attended the University of Education, Winneba where he graduated with his Bachelor of Education in Accounting and also attend Ghana Institute of Management and Public Administration (GIMPA) located at Achimota in Accra for his Executive Masters in Governance and Leadership(EMGL) in 2008.

== Career ==
Zakari is a teacher by profession.

== Political life ==
Zakari was elected on the ticket of the National Democratic Congress (NDC) to represent the Walewale constituency after winning with 11,355 votes during the 2004 Ghanaian general election. He had a total of 35.30% of all votes cast during the 2004 elections and won to represent the Walewale constituency. He contested again and won in the 2008 Ghanaian general election which gave him the opportunity to represent his constituency for the second time.

== Personal life ==
He is married with nine children and is a Muslim.
