= Reformed Patriotic Democrats =

Political party in Ghana

- Abbreviation: RPD
- Chairperson: Kwabena Adjei
- General Secretary: Kwame Manu Sarpong
- Founded: 2004; 21 years ago
- Registered: 2008; 17 years ago
- Split from: National Democratic Congress
- National affiliation: Ghana
- Colours: Green, White and Blue
- Slogan: Youth in Service for development

The Reformed Patriotic Democrats is a political party in Ghana. It was founded in 2004 and registered with the Electoral Commission of Ghana in 2008. Although it was not involved with the 2020 Ghanaian general election, it is still listed on the website of the commission as a registered party.

Kwabena Adjei was the interim chairman in 2007. He disclosed that the party has members supporting Ekwow Spio-Garbrah who had lost out on the race to be the presidential candidate for the National Democratic Congress for the 2008 election.

== See also ==
- List of political parties in Ghana
