= Simons Addai =

Ghanaian politician

Hon. Simons Addai

Member of the Ghanaian Parliament for Techiman South
- In office 7 January 2009 – 6 January 2013
- President: John Atta Mills; John Mahama

Member of Parliament for Techiman South Constituency
- In office 7 January 2005 – 6 January 2009
- President: John Kufuor

Personal details
- Born: 14 April 1954 (age 72)
- Party: National Democratic Congress
- Children: 3
- Education: University of Cape Coast
- Profession: Educationist; Politician

Simons Addai is a Ghanaian politician and educationist. He was a member of parliament for the Techiman South constituency from 7 January 2009 to 6 January 2013 on the ticket of the National Democratic Congress.

== Early life and education ==
Addai was born on 14 April 1954. He comes from Krobo-Techiman, Brong Ahafo Region of Ghana. He obtained his bachelor's degree (BEd) at the University of Cape Coast in the year 2003.

== Career ==
Addai is an educationist. He worked with the Ghana Education Service as a Principal Superintendent and teacher at Bamiri LA JSS.

== Politics ==
=== 2004 Elections ===
Addai was first elected as a member of the 4th Parliament of the 4th Republic of Ghana, which started from January 2005 to January 2009. He was elected to represent the constituency in the 2004 Ghanaian general elections. He was elected with 27,803votes out of a total 58,160total votes cast. This was equivalent to 47.80% of total valid votes cast. He was elected over Amadu Bermah Suleman of the People's National Convention, Prince Oduro-Mensah of the New Patriotic Party, Joshua Kwame Owusu Brempong of the Convention People's Party and Abdel Hamid Baba an independent candidate. These obtained 1,775votes, 24,416votes, 735votes and 3,431 votes respectively of the total valid votes cast. These were equivalent to 3.1%, 42.0%, 1.3% and 5.9% of total valid votes cast. Addai was elected on the ticket of the National Democratic Congress. His constituency was a part of 10 parliamentary seats out of a total 24 parliamentary seats for the Brong Ahafo region of Ghana. In all, the National Democratic Congress won a minority 94 parliamentary representation out of 230 seats in the 4th parliament of the 4th republic of Ghana.

=== 2008 Elections ===
Addai was a member of parliament for Techiman South constituency from 7 January 2009 to 6 January 2013 on the ticket of the National Democratic Congress. He thus represented the constituency in the 5th parliament of the 4th republic of Ghana. He was elected in the 2008 Ghanaian general elections. He polled 28,586 votes out of the 56,478 valid votes cast during the 2008 Ghanaian parliamentary elections. This was equivalent to 50.61% of total valid votes cast. He was elected over Prince Yaw Donyina of the New Patriotic Party, Amoah David Dumah of the People's National Convention, Lale David Den of the Democratic Freedom Party and Daniel Mensah of the Convention People's Party. These obtained 26,829votes, 633votes, 165votes and 265votes respectively of total valid votes cast. These were equivalent to 7.50%, 1.12%, 0.29% and 0.47% respectively. In that election, the National Democratic Congress won a majority 114 parliamentary seats out of a total 230 seats in the 5th parliament of the 4th republic of Ghana.

== Personal life ==
Addai is married with three children. He is a Christian, an Adventist to be precise.
