= Iddrisu Dawuda =

Ghanaian politician

Hon.Iddrisu Dawuda Iddrisu Dawuda

For karaga Member of parliament

Member of Parliament for Karaga constituency
- In office 7 January 2005 – 6 January 2013
- President: Late John Evans Attah Mills

Personal details
- Born: 22 May 1950 (age 76) Karaga
- Died: 21st January,2024
- Party: National Democratic Congress
- Domestic partner: Hajia Ayi
- Children: Dawuda Abubakari,Dawuda Abdul Wadud, Dawuda Karimatu and Dawuda lamnatu. And the other four
- Occupation: Educationist/Teacher

Iddrisu Dawuda (born May 22, 1950) is a Ghanaian politician and also an Educationist/Teacher. He also served as the Member of Parliament for the Karaga constituency in the Northern Region of Ghana.

== Early life and education ==
Dawuda was born on 22 May 1950 in Karaga, Northern Region of Ghana. He obtained a Teachers' cert. 'A' in 1972 from Kanton Teachers' Training College and a Diploma in Basic Education.

== Politics ==
Dawuda was a member of the Fifth Parliament of the Fourth Republic of Ghana elected on the ticket of the National Democratic Congress (NDC) during the December 2008 Ghanaian general election as the member of Parliament for the Karaga constituency. He defeated Baba Wahab of New Patriotic Party (NPP) and three others to win the Karaga parliamentary seat with 13,352 votes out of the 23,441 valid votes cast = 57.0%. He served from 2004 to 2012, Dawuda lost the seat in 2012 to Alhassan Sualihu Dandaawa (NDC).

== Career ==
He was a GES headteacher and an assistant director of Sakasaka Primary 'C School in Tamale, Northern Region. He has also served as a member of parliament for the Karaga constituency (Jan. 2005 to December 2012).

== Personal life ==
Dawuda is a Muslim, married with six children.
