= Abubakari Sumani =

Ghanaian politician (born 1946)

Abukari Sumani

Member of Parliament for the Tamale North Constituency
- In office 7 January 2005 – 6 January 2013
- Preceded by: New
- Succeeded by: Alhassan Dahamani

Member of Parliament for the Chogu/Tishigu Constituency
- In office 7 January 2000 – 6 January 2005
- Preceded by: Ibrahim Adam
- Succeeded by: Constituency abolished

Personal details
- Born: 28 April 1946 (age 80) Savelugu, Northern Region Gold Coast (now Ghana)
- Party: National Democratic Congress
- Education: University of Ghana, Ghana School of Law
- Occupation: Politician
- Profession: Lawyer

Abukari Sumani (born 28 April 1946) was a former Lawyer and an ambassador of Ghana to Saudi Arabia, Pakistan and the Gulf states. He was also a politician and a former Member of parliament for the Tamale North Constituency of the Northern Region of Ghana.

He died at the Korle-Bu Teaching Hospital on Saturday 12 August 2017.

== Early life and education ==
Sumani was born in 1946 at Savelugu in the Northern Region of Ghana. He studied an LLB in law at the University of Ghana in 1970 and later proceeded to the Ghana School of Law to obtain a BL in 1972. Sumani was a member of the Dagbon royal family and a former board chair of the Public Procurement Authority.

== Politics ==
Sumani was a member of the 5th parliament of the 4th republic of Ghana. His political career began in 2000 when he became a member of parliament for the Tishigu/Choggu constituency as a member of the National Democratic Congress. He contested again in the 2004 General Elections as a candidate for the Tamale North constituency and won with a total number of 37,854 votes making 73.2% of the total votes cast. He retained his seat for the third time in 2008 with a total of 31,127 votes making 51.60% of the total votes cast. He contested in the 2012 elections and lost to an independent Candidate Dahamani Alhassan.

== Personal life ==
Sumani was a Muslim and was married with ten children.
