= Kofi Bediako Gershon Gbediame =

Ghanaian politician

Hon. Gershon Kofi Bediako Gbediame

Member of Parliament
- In office January 2005 – 2008
- President: John Kufuor
- Constituency: Nkwanta South

Member of Parliament
- In office 7 January 2009 – 6 January 2013
- President: John Atta Mills
- Constituency: Nkwanta South
- Majority: NDC

Personal details
- Party: National Democratic Congress
- Children: 5
- Education: University of Cape Coast
- Occupation: Educationist

Kofi Bediako Gershon Gbediame is a Ghanaian politician and member of the Sixth Parliament of the Fourth Republic of Ghana representing the Nkwanta South Constituency in the Volta region of Ghana on the ticket of the National Democratic Congress.

== Early life and education ==
Gbediame was born in Pusupu Ntruo in the Volta region. He attended University of Cape Coast where he obtained a bachelor's degree in Physics and a diploma in Education in 1979.

== Career ==
Gbediame is an educationist. He was Senior Superintendent and tutor at Presbyterian Boys' Senior High at Legon. He became an MP in 1997. He was a Physics Teacher. He was the former Majority Chief Whip after replacing E. T. Mensah.

== Politics ==
Gbediame is a member of the National Democratic Congress. He is in the 5th term of being a Member of Parliament. He won his parliamentary elections in 1997 by obtaining 13, 870 out of 36,819 valid vote cast. This was equivalent to 37.67% of the total votes. He has been in parliament from 1997 to date.

Gbediame was elected as Member of parliament for the Nkwanta South constituency in the 5th parliament of the 4th republic.

He was elected on the ticket of the National Democratic Congress and obtained 18,171 votes out of 31,479 total valid votes cast, equivalent to 57.72% of total valid votes cast.

He was elected over Joseph Booker Yaw Denteh of the New Patriotic Party; and David Boamah Asomani, Oliver Ayivi and Okogye A K Joseph, three independent candidates.

== Personal life ==
Gbediame is married with five children. He is a Christian who fellowships at the Great Commission Church International.
