= Tamale North (Ghana parliament constituency) =

Ghana parliament constituency

- constituency for the Parliament of Ghana
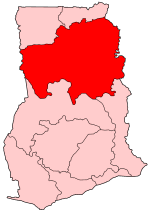
- District: Tamale Municipal District
- Region: Northern Region of Ghana

Current constituency
- Created: 2004
- Party: National Democratic Congress
- MP: Suhuyini Alhassan Sayibu

Tamale North is one of the constituencies represented in the Parliament of Ghana. It elects one Member of Parliament (MP) by the first past the post system of election. Suhuyini Alhassan Sayibu is the member of parliament for the constituency. Tamale North is located in the Tamale Municipal district of the Northern Region of Ghana.

This seat was created prior to the Ghanaian parliamentary election in 2004.

== Boundaries ==
The seat is located within the Tamale Municipal district of the Northern Region of Ghana.

== Members of Parliament ==
Election	Member	Party
2004	Constituency created	
2004	Alhaji Abubakari Sumani	National Democratic Congress
2008		
2012		
2016		
2020	Alhassan Sayibu Suhuyini	National Democratic Congress
2024	Alhassan Sayibu Suhuyini	National Democratic Congress

== Elections ==
2008 Ghanaian parliamentary election: Tamale South Source:Ghana Home Page
Party	Candidate	Votes	%	±%
National Democratic Congress	Alhaji Abubakari Sumani	31,127	56.7	−16.5
Independent	Alhassan Dahamani	11,254	20.5	20.2
New Patriotic Party	Abdel-Mejeed Haroun	11,170	20.4	0.3
Convention People's Party	Abu Alhassan Nyabto	610	1.1	−2.8
People's National Convention	Emelia Afua Awuni	505	0.9	−1.6
Democratic People's Party	Salifu Anass	204	0.4	—
Majority		19,873	36.2	−16.9
Turnout				

2004 Ghanaian parliamentary election: Tamale South Source:Electoral Commission of Ghana
Party	Candidate	Votes	%	±%
National Democratic Congress	Alhaji Abubakari Sumani	37,854	73.2	—
New Patriotic Party	Haroun Abdel-Majeed	10,418	20.1	—
Convention People's Party	Basharu Alhassan Daballi	1,993	3.9	—
People's National Convention	Emelia Afua Awuni	1,307	2.5	—
Independent	Issah Ahamed	154	0.3	—
Majority		27,436	53.1	—
Turnout		52,507	87.9	—

== See also ==
- List of Ghana Parliament constituencies
