= Stephen Kunsu =

Ghanaian politician

Hon. Stephen Kunsu

Member of the Ghana Parliament for Kintampo North
- In office 7 January 2013 – 6 January 2017
- President: John Mahama
- Succeeded by: Kwasi Etu-Bonde

Member of Parliament for Kintampo North Constituency
- In office 7 January 2009 – 6 January 2013
- President: John Atta Mills; John Mahama

Member of Parliament for Kintampo North Constituency
- In office 7 January 2005 – 6 January 2009
- President: John Kufuor

Personal details
- Born: 30 September 1949 (age 76)
- Party: National Democratic Congress
- Children: 6
- Profession: Educationist

Stephen Kunsu is a Ghanaian politician and member of the Fifth and Seventh Parliament of the Fourth Republic of Ghana representing Kintampo North in the Brong Ahafo region of Ghana.

== Early life and education ==
Kunsu was born on 30 September 1949. His hometown is Ahenakrom in the Brong Ahafo region. He qualified as a teacher by passing his Teacher's Certificate A in 1970.

== Employment ==
He was the District Chief Executive of Kintampo District from 1999 to 2000. He was also the assistant director and Circuit Supervisor of the Ghana Education Service and then a Member of Parliament from January 2005.

== Politics ==
Kunsu is a member of National Democratic Congress. He has served in the 4th, 5th and 6th parliaments of the 4th republic of Ghana.

=== 2004 Elections ===
He was first voted into Parliament in 2004 in the 2004 Ghanaian general elections. He was elected to represent the Kintampo North Constituency after it was newly created in 2004. Thus, he represented the constituency in the 4th parliament of the 4th republic of Ghana. Kunsu was elected with 18,922 votes out of 30,677 total valid votes cast, equivalent to 61.70% of total valid votes cast. He was elected over Isaac Kwabena Sarkodie Boahin of the New Patriotic Party, Kwaku Anane-Gyinde an independent candidate, Alhaji Osman Ahmed of the Convention People's Party and Anthony Mainooh of the Democratic People's Party. These obtained 33.00%, 3.30%, 1.10% and 0.80% respectively of total valid votes cast. In that election, the National Democratic Congress won 10 seats out of 24 parliamentary seats in the Brong Ahafo region. In all, the party won a minority 94 out of a total 230parliamentary seats in the 4th parliament of the 4th republic.

=== 2008 Elections ===
In 2008, he was re-elected as the Member of Parliament for the Kintampo North constituency in the Brong Ahafo region by obtaining 17,965 votes out of the 32,887 valid votes cast, equivalent to 54.6% to total valid votes cast. He was elected over Awudulai Razak of the New Patriotic Party, Yelebepuori A Rashid of the People's National Convention, Jayem B Francis of the Democratic Freedom Party, D D Boateng of the Convention People's Party, Huseein Abass and Jonas Osei Bonsu – two independent candidates. These obtained 41.10%, 0.66%, 0.33%, 0.99% and 2.29% of the total valid votes cast. Kunsu won on the ticket of the National Democratic Congress. His constituency formed a part of 8 parliamentary representations out of a total 24 seats won by the National Democratic Congress for the Brong Ahafo region. in the 5th parliament of the 4th republic. In the 2008 Ghanaian general elections, the National Democratic Congress won a majority total of 114 parliamentary representations out of 230parliamentary seats.

=== 2012 Elections ===
Kunsu was elected for the third time as the Member of Parliament to represent the Kintampo North constituency in the Brong Ahafo region in the 2012 Ghanaian general elections. He thus represented the constituency again in the 6th parliament of the 4th republic of Ghana. He was elected with 22,761 votes out of 42,119 total valid votes cast. This was equivalent to 54% of the total valid votes cast. He was elected over Razak Awudulai of the New Patriotic Party, James Kwabena Bomfeh(Jnr) of the Convention People's Party, Jonas Osei Bonsu of the Progressive People's Party and Ayimadu Kwadwo Matthew of the National Democratic Party. These obtained about 41%, 3%, 0.8% and 0.4% of total valid votes cast.

== Personal life ==
Kunsu is married with six children. He is a Christian (Presbyterian).
