= Nana Yaw Edward Ofori-Kuragu =

Ghanaian politician

Hon. Nana Yaw Edward Ofori-Kaguru

Member of Parliament for Bosome-Freho Constituency
- In office 7 January 2009 – 6 January 2013
- President: John Atta Mills; John Mahama

Member of Parliament for Bosome-Freho Constituency
- In office 7 January 2005 – 6 January 2009
- President: John Kufuor

Personal details
- Born: 19 December 1963 (age 62)
- Party: Independent Member
- Children: 2
- Education: University of East London
- Profession: Hotelier

Nana Yaw Edward Ofori-Kaguru (born 19 December 1963) is a hotelier and Ghanaian politician of the Republic of Ghana. He was the Member of Parliament representing Besome-Freho constituency of the Ashanti Region of Ghana in the 4th and 5th Parliament of the 4th Republic of Ghana. He was an independent member of the Parliament.

== Early life and education ==
Ofori-Kaguru was born on 19 December 1963. He hails from Tepaso, a town in the Ashanti Region of Ghana. He is a product of the University of East London, UK. He holds a Masters in Business Administration degree in Finance from the university. He acquired the degree in 1994.

== Career ==
Ofori-Kaguru is a hotelier and worked as the managing director of Cozy Lodge in Kumasi. He was also the managing director of Cozy Gardens and Restaurant in Kumasi.

== Political career ==
Ofori-Kaguru is an independent member in Ghanaian politics. He became a member of parliament from January 2005 after emerging winner in the General Election in December 2004. He run a second term and won. He was the MP for Besome-Freho constituency. He was elected as the member of parliament for this constituency in the fourth and fifth parliaments of the fourth Republic of Ghana. In 2012, He decided to contest for the office again under the membership of the New patriotic party but he lost the primaries to Kyei Frimpong, his opponent after which he decided to contest individually again but lost again in the General Elections gaining 4,767 votes which was not enough to beat Kyei Frimpong who polled 14,325 votes.

== Elections ==
Ofori-Kaguru was elected as the member of parliament for the Besome-Freho constituency of the Ashanti Region of Ghana for the first time in the 2004 Ghanaian general elections. He contested as an independent candidate. He was elected with 16,209 votes out of 19,796 total valid votes cast equivalent to 81.9% of total valid votes cast. He was elected over Kwame Adarkwa of the National Democratic Congress and Richmond Addai Agyare of the Convention People's Party. These obtained 17.3% and 0.8% respectively of total valid votes cast.

In 2008, he won the general elections for the same constituency. He was elected with 9,140 votes out of 19,462 total valid votes cast equivalent to 46.96% of total valid votes cast. He was elected over Kwadwo Kyei Frimpong of the National People’ Party, Asiedu Anthony Kennedy of the National Democratic Congress and Sebastian Sunnoma of the Democratic Freedom Party. These obtained 41.43%, 11.25% and 0.35% respectively of the total votes cast.

== Personal life ==
Ofori-Kaguru is a Catholic Christian. He is married with two children.

== See also ==
- List of MPs elected in the 2004 Ghanaian parliamentary election
- List of MPs elected in the 2008 Ghanaian parliamentary election
