= Rafatu Alhassan Dubie Halutie =

Ghanaian politician

Alhassan Dubie Halutie

MP for Sissala East
- In office 7 January 2009 – 6 January 2013
- President: John Evans Atta Mills

Personal details
- Born: 22 November 1947 (age 78) Kong, Upper West Region Gold Coast (now Ghana)
- Party: National Democratic Congress
- Education: Ghana Institute of Management and Public Administration
- Occupation: Politician
- Profession: Nurse

Alhassan Dubie Halutie is a Ghanaian politician and a nurse. She is a member of parliament for Sissala-East constituency in the Upper West Region of Ghana.

== Early life and education ==
Halutie was born on 22 November 1947 at Kong in the Upper West Region of Ghana and hails from Tumu in the Upper West Region. She attended the Bolgatanga Nursing Training School from 1964 to1967 and continued at Koforidua Midwifery Training School from 1968 to 1969.

She also the Kintampo Rural Training School and entered the Family Planning Training School in Tamale.

She undertook a course in Women in Management Supervisory at Ghana Institute of Management and Public Administration (GIMPA) and Community Interactive and Country Planning course in Tamale in the year 2000.

== Career ==
She was a nurse by profession. She was the Senior Medical Assistant of Tumu Hospital in 1997 and the Principal Medical Assistant of Tumu Hospital from 1996 to 2007.

== Political life ==
Halutie in 1994 was appointed an Assembly Member for the Sissala District Assembly. She later became the Presiding Member between 2000 and 2001.

She was the Parliamentary Candidate for the National Democratic Congress (NDC) in the Sissala East Constituency during the 2004 elections. In 2006, she became the First Deputy Regional Women's Organizer of the NDC in the Upper West Region, and was elected a member of parliament (NDC) for Sissala East Constituency.

== Personal life ==
She is a Muslim and is married with five children.
