= Amenfi West (Ghana parliament constituency) =

Constituency in Ghana

- constituency for the Parliament of Ghana
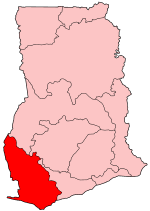
- District: Wasa Amenfi West District
- Region: Western Region of Ghana

Current constituency
- Party: National Democratic Congress
- MP: Eric Afful

Amenfi West is one of the constituencies represented in the Parliament of Ghana. It elects one Member of Parliament (MP) by the first past the post system of election. Amenfi West is located in the Wasa Amenfi West district of the Western Region of Ghana.

== Boundaries ==
The seat is located entirely within the Wasa Amenfi West district of the Western Region of Ghana.

== Members of Parliament ==
Election	Member	Party
1992		
1996	Abraham Kofi Asante	National Democratic Congress
2003	Agnes Sonful	New Patriotic Party
2004	John Gyetuah	National Democratic Congress
2015	Eric Afful	National Democratic Congress
2016	Eric Afful	National Democratic Congress
2020	Eric Afful	National Democratic Congress
2024	Eric Afful	National Democratic Congress

== Elections ==
Amenfi West by-election, 2015 Source:Electoral Commission of Ghana
Party	Candidate	Votes	%	±%
National Democratic Congress	Eric Afful	15,809	52.64	—
New Patriotic Party	Paul Dekyi	13,076	43.54	—
Progressive People's Party	Abraham Kojo Buadee	1,032	3.44	—
United Front Party	Adjei Elvis	113	0.38	—
Majority		2,733	9.1	—
Turnout		30,561	49.0	—

2012 Ghanaian parliamentary election: Amenfi West Source:Ghanaweb
Party	Candidate	Votes	%	±%
National Democratic Congress	John Gyetuah	26,435	—	—
New Patriotic Party	Paul Dekyi	16,829	—	—
Majority		—	—	—

2008 Ghanaian parliamentary election: Amenfi West
Party	Candidate	Votes	%	±%
National Democratic Congress	John Gyetuah	—	—	—
Majority		—	—	—

2004 Ghanaian parliamentary election: Amenfi West Source:National Electoral Commission, Ghana
Party	Candidate	Votes	%	±%
National Democratic Congress	John Gyetuah	15,233	52.1	+16.8
New Patriotic Party	Agnes Sonful	13,108	44.9	−19.0
Convention People's Party	Kofi Bayim Antwi	509	1.7	—
Great Consolidated Popular Party	Dizon Ble Abukwaw	360	1.2	—
Majority		4,121	28.6	0.0
Turnout		30,146	85.3	+47.5

Mrs. Agnes Sonful (NPP), a teacher, 52, won the by-election held on 24 April 2003with a majority of 4,121 due to the resignation of Abraham Kofi Asante on 26 March 2003.

Amenfi West by-election, 2003 Source:Ghana Home Page
Party	Candidate	Votes	%	±%
New Patriotic Party	Agnes Sonful	9,218	63.9	+19.3
National Democratic Congress	Gerald Danquah	5,097	35.3	−15.7
Democratic People's Party	Ebo Archer	121	0.8	—
Majority		4,121	28.6	+24.2
Turnout		14,746	37.8	—

2000 Ghanaian parliamentary election: Amenfi West Source:Adam Carr's Election Archives
Party	Candidate	Votes	%	±%
National Democratic Congress	Abraham Kofi Asante	10,848	51.0	—
New Patriotic Party	Samuel Alberto Tekyi	9,493	44.6	—
Convention People's Party	Kwasi Dankama Quarm	937	4.4	—
Majority		1,355	6.4	—

1996 Ghanaian parliamentary election: Amenfi West Source:Ghana Home Page
Party	Candidate	Votes	%	±%
National Democratic Congress	Abraham Kofi Asante	16,085	—	—
New Patriotic Party	Samuel Alberto Takyi	8,311	—	—
Majority		7,774	—	—

== See also ==
- List of Ghana Parliament constituencies
