= Sissala East (Ghana parliament constituency) =

Constituency in Ghana

- constituency for the Parliament of Ghana
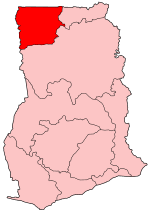
- District: Sissala East Municipal
- Region: Upper West Region of Ghana

Current constituency
- Party: National Democratic Congress
- MP: Mohammed Issah Bataglia

Sissala East is one of the constituencies represented in the Parliament of Ghana. It elects one Member of Parliament (MP) by the first past the post system of election. Mohammed Issah Bataglia is the member of parliament for the constituency. Sissala East is located in the Sissala East Municipal of the Upper West Region of Ghana.

This seat was created prior to the Ghanaian parliamentary election in 2004.

== Boundaries ==
The seat is located within the Sissala East District of the Upper West Region of Ghana. Its northern neighbour is Burkina Faso. To the north west is the Sissala West constituency and the Wa East is to the south west. From north to south along the eastern border lie the Chiana-Paga constituency in the Kassena/Nankana District and the Builsa North and Builsa South constituencies in the Builsa District, all within the Upper East Region.

== History ==
In 2004, the Sissala West was carved out of this constituency by the Electoral Commission of Ghana. The MPs and results listed here prior to 2004 are for the old Sissala constituency.

== Members of Parliament ==
| Election | Member | Party |
|---|---|---|
| 1992 | Alhaji Amidu Sulemana | National Democratic Congress |
| 2000 | Moses Dani Baah | People's National Convention |
| 2008 | Alhassan Dubie Halutie | National Democratic Congress |

== Elections ==
2008 Ghanaian parliamentary election:Sissala East Source:Ghana Home Page
| Party | Candidate | Votes | % | ±% |
|---|---|---|---|---|
| National Democratic Congress | Alhassan Dubie Halutie | 7,060 | 36.9 | — |
| People's National Convention | Moses Dani Baah PNC | 6,843 | 35.8 | — |
| New Patriotic Party | Issah Baworun Ahmed | 5,226 | 27.3 | — |
| Majority | | 217 | 1.1 | — |
| Turnout | | — | — | — |

== See also ==
- List of Ghana Parliament constituencies
