= Nana Abu Bonsra =

Ghanaian politician

Hon. Nana Abu Bonsra
- Constituency: Fomena

Member of Parliament
- In office 7 January 2009 – 6 January 2013
- President: John Atta Mills

Personal details
- Born: 3 September 1949 (age 76)
- Party: New Patriotic Party
- Occupation: Development Planners/Architects/Quantity Surveyors

Nana Abu Bonsra (born 17 march 1957) is a Ghanaian politician who served as the member of parliament for the Fomena Constituency.

== Early life and education ==
Nana was born on 17 March 1957. He hails from Dompoase a town in the Ashanti Region of Ghana. He obtained his BSc in design from the Kwame Nkrumah University of Science and Technology in 1981. He further had his Post graduate diploma in Architecture from the same university in 1985.

== Career ==
He is a development planner by profession. He is also an architect and a quantity surveyor.

== Politics ==
He is a member of New Patriotic Party. He was the member of parliament for Fomena Constituency in the Ashanti region of Ghana. This was for the 5th parliament of the 4th republic of Ghana. He obtained 11,787 votes out of the 16,650 valid votes cast equivalent to 70.8% of total votes cast. He won against Samuel Pinkrah of the National Democratic Congress, Augustine Kofi Tieku of the Democratic People's Party and James Kobina Seotah of the convention's People's Party. These obtained respectively 20.60%, 0.46% and 8.14% of total valid votes cast in the 2008 Ghana general elections for the Fomena Constituency.

== Personal life ==
Bonsra is a Christian and a member of the Methodist Church.
