= Democratic People's Party (Ghana) =

Political party in Ghana

- Chairman: Thomas Nuako Ward-Brew
- Secretary-General: Alhaji Muhammad Salisu Sulaimana
- Vice Chairman: G.M. Tettey
- Vice Chairman: Ekow Bentil
- Founded: 1992
- Headquarters: H/No. 698/4, Star Avenue, Kokomlemle, Accra
- Ideology: Nkrumaism; Pan-africanism; African socialism
- Colours: White and rainbow
- Slogan: God Is Great

Election symbol
- White Dove with an olive branch in its beak flying above the rainbow

The Democratic People's Party is a Ghanaian political party formed in 1992, after the ban on political party activity was lifted by the Provisional National Defence Council government of Ghana. The party claims to follow the Nkrumahist tradition along with the People's National Convention (PNC), Great Consolidated Popular Party (GCPP), National Reform Party (NRP) and the Convention People's Party (CPP).

== Progressive Alliance ==
The party formed the "Progressive Alliance" with the National Democratic Congress (NDC) and the Every Ghanaian Living Everywhere (EGLE) for the presidential election in December 1992. Their common presidential candidate was Jerry Rawlings of the NDC. This alliance continued through the 1996 elections with the party not fielding its own candidates. The party however started fielding its own presidential and parliamentary candidates since the December 2000 elections but has won no seats in parliament.

== 2004 presidential election ==
The presidential nominee of the party, Thomas N. Ward-Brew, a lawyer, was hours late submitting his nomination documents and was unable to contest the Ghanaian presidential election on 7 December 2004.

== Election performance ==
=== Parliamentary elections ===
Election	Number of DPP votes	Share of votes	Seats	+/-	Position	Outcome of election
2016	867	0.01%	0	Steady	▼10	Not represented in parliament
2012	3,052	0.0%	0	Steady	8	Not represented in parliament
2008	8,841	0.1%	0	Steady		Not represented in parliament
2004	9,955	0.12%	0	Steady	7	Not represented in parliament
1996	8,247	0.1%	0		7	Not represented in parliament

=== Presidential elections ===
Election	Candidate	Number of votes	Share of votes	Outcome of election
2008	Thomas Ward-Brew	8,653	0.10%	7th of 8
1996	—			Progressive Alliance backed Rawlings (NDC)

== Party symbols ==
The symbols of the party are as follow:

- Motto: God is Great
- Colours: The rainbow over a white background
- Symbol: White dove with an olive branch and leaves in its mouth all over a rainbow.

== See also ==
- List of political parties in Ghana
