= 2008 Ghanaian general election =

- Presidential election
- 7 December 2008 (first round); 28 December 2008 (second round)
- Turnout: 69.52% (first round); 72.91% (second round)
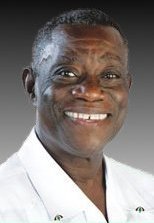

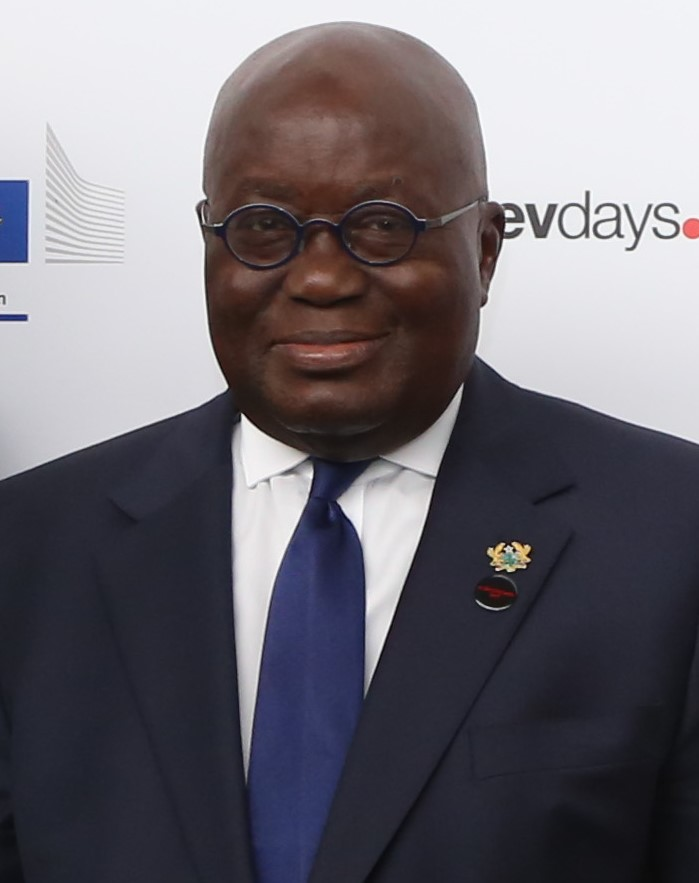
Nominee	John Atta Mills	Nana Akufo-Addo
Party	NDC	NPP
Running mate	John Mahama	Mahamudu Bawumia
Popular vote	4,521,032	4,480,446
Percentage	50.23%	49.77%
President before election
John Kufuor
NPP
President-elect
John Atta Mills
NDC

General elections were held in Ghana on 7 December 2008. Since no candidate received more than 50% of the votes, a run-off election was held on 28 December 2008 between the two candidates who received the most votes, Nana Akufo-Addo of the governing New Patriotic Party and John Atta Mills of the opposition National Democratic Congress. Mills was certified as the victor by a margin of less than one percent, winning the presidency on his third attempt. It is to date the closest election in Ghanaian history.

== Background ==
On 21 December 2006, former Vice-President John Atta Mills, who unsuccessfully ran as the National Democratic Congress (NDC) presidential candidate in 2000 and 2004, was overwhelmingly elected by NDC as its candidate for the 2008 presidential election.

Former Foreign Minister Nana Akufo-Addo was elected as the 2008 presidential candidate of the governing New Patriotic Party (NPP) at a party congress on 23 December 2007. Although he fell short of the required 50%, the second-place candidate, former Trade Minister John Alan Kyeremanten, conceded defeat and backed Akufo-Addo.

The stakes of the election were raised by the discovery of oil in Ghana and an expectation for incoming oil revenues to begin in 2010. Additionally, allegations of electoral fraud that resulted in violence following elections in Kenya and Zimbabwe and military coups d'état in Mauritania and Guinea caused international election monitors to hope the Ghanaian elections would refurbish the image of constitutional democracy in Africa.

== Presidential candidates ==
The following eight candidates formally registered with the Electoral Commission of Ghana.

- Kwabena Adjei – A managing director of a timber company representing the Reformed Patriotic Democrats
- Nana Akufo-Addo – The former Attorney General and Minister for Justice, Minister for Foreign Affairs, and a current member of Parliament representing the New Patriotic Party (NPP)
- Kwasi Amoafo-Yeboah – An independent candidate
- Emmanuel Ansah-Antwi – Representing the Democratic Freedom Party (DFP)
- Edward Nasigri Mahama – Representing the People's National Convention (PNC)
- John Atta Mills – The former Vice-President representing the National Democratic Congress (NDC)
- Paa Kwesi Nduom – The former Minister for Economic Planning & Regional Cooperation, Minister for Energy, Minister for Public Sector Reform, and a current member of Parliament representing the Convention People's Party (CPP)
- Thomas Nuako Ward-Brew – Representing the Democratic People's Party (DPP)

== Opinion polls ==
A poll conducted in April 2008 showed Mills slightly ahead of Akufo-Addo. The National Commission for Civic Education conducted the poll which sampled 5,327 people. The poll also predicted a high voter turnout of 96.9%. Respondents came from coastal, middle and northern areas of the country.

Another poll conducted in October 2008 by the Angus Reid Global Monitor saw Akufo-Addo leading. The poll was conducted by interviewing 3,000 adults in all the regions of the country.

Administered	Akufo-Addo (NPP)	Ansah-Antwi (DFP)	Mills (NDC)	Mahama (PNC)	Nduom (CPP)	Undecided	Source
Apr. 2008	42.6%	—	42.9%	1.1%	6.3%	7.1%	
Oct. 2008	50.5%	0.4%	35.6%	2.1%	7.0%	—	

== Results ==
Turnout on election day was very high. Since few votes were expected for other candidates than those of the two largest parties, a first-round victory for Akufo-Addo or Mills was seen as possible, but Nduom stated he wished to "surprise" the other parties by gaining enough votes to force a run-off between the two others. With 40% of the vote counted, Akufo-Addo was leading with 49.5% to Mills's 47.6%. While Mills pulled ahead afterwards, Akufo-Addo again led by a slim margin with over 70% of the votes counted.

The second round was rerun on 28 December 2008 but due to logistics problems, the Tain District alone had its run-off election on 2 January 2009 due to problems with distributing ballots. Following the voting on 28 December, Mills led by a slim margin, causing the Election Commission to state it would not announce Mills as the winner until after the election rerun in Tain. Prior to the announcement hundreds of NDC supporters converged on the election headquarters demanding that Mills be declared the victor, but were kept at bay by riot police and armed soldiers.

Fear of election day violence caused the NPP to file a lawsuit seeking to delay voting in Tain as it claimed that "the atmosphere in the rural district was not conducive to a free and fair election". The court denied the NPP's injunction request and said it would only hear the case on 5 January 2009. In response, the NPP called its supporters to boycott the vote, for which it was criticised by civil groups.

=== President ===
Candidate	Running mate	Party	First round		Second round	
Candidate	Running mate	Party	Votes	%	Votes	%
John Atta Mills	John Mahama	National Democratic Congress	4,056,634	47.92	4,521,032	50.23
Nana Akufo-Addo	Mahamudu Bawumia	New Patriotic Party	4,159,439	49.13	4,480,446	49.77
Paa Kwesi Nduom	Michael Abu Sakara Foster	Convention People's Party	113,494	1.34		
Edward Mahama	Petra Maria Amegashie	People's National Convention	73,494	0.87		
Emmanuel Ansah-Antwi	Patricia Ameku	Democratic Freedom Party	27,889	0.33		
Kwasi Amoafo-Yeboah	X-Shalom Yaw Gonu	Independent	19,342	0.23		
Thomas Ward-Brew	Peter Dwamena	Democratic People's Party	8,653	0.10		
Kwabena Adjei	Rosemond Abraham	Reformed Patriotic Democrats	6,889	0.08		
Total			8,465,834	100.00	9,001,478	100.00
Valid votes			8,465,834	97.63	9,001,478	98.98
Invalid/blank votes			205,438	2.37	92,886	1.02
Total votes			8,671,272	100.00	9,094,364	100.00
Registered voters/turnout			12,472,758	69.52	12,472,758	72.91
Source: African Elections Database

=== Parliament ===
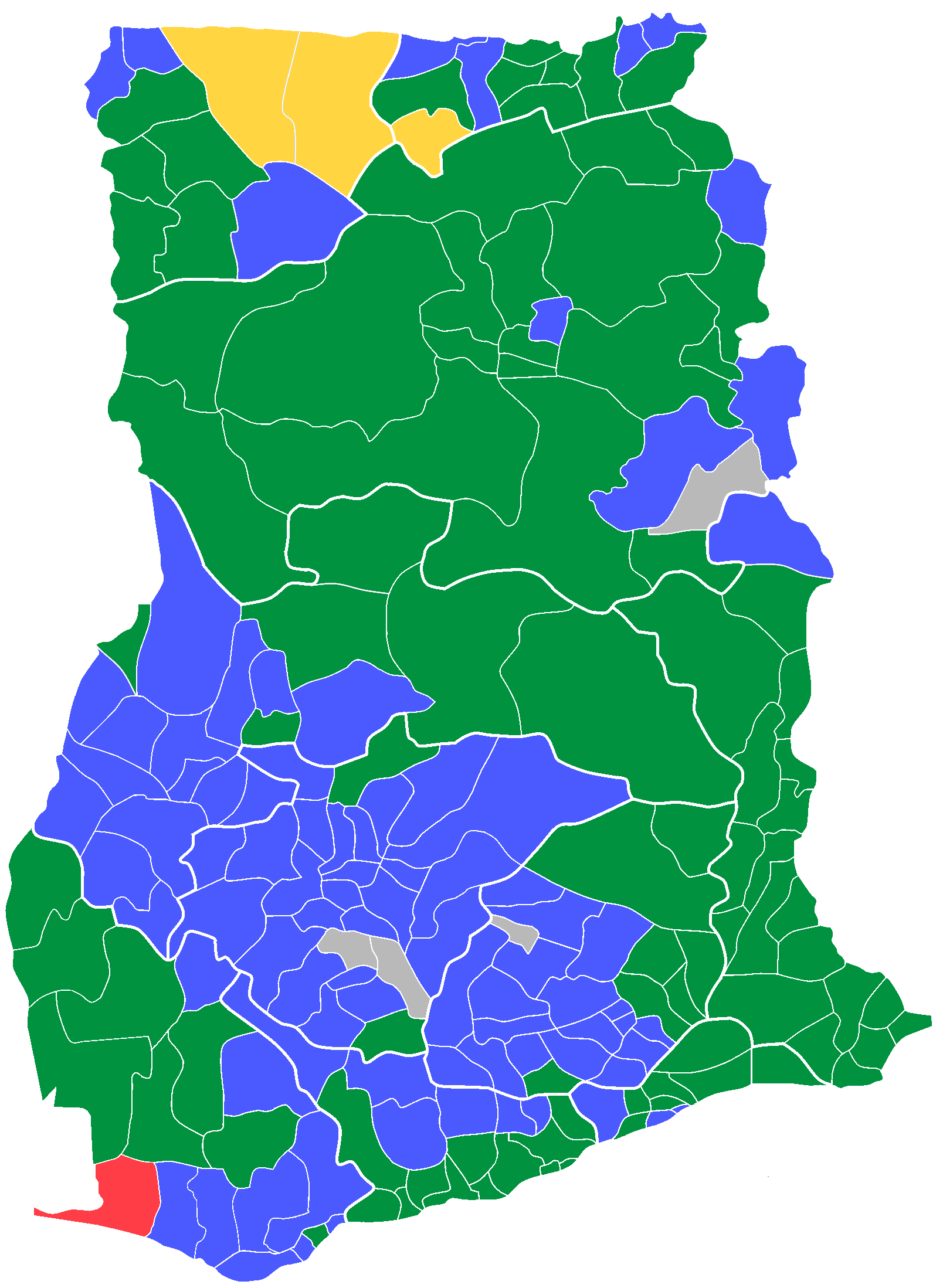
Map showing the party-political geography of Ghana after the 2008 parliamentary elections. Green: National Democratic Congress Blue: New Patriotic Party Yellow: People's National Convention Red: Convention People's Party Grey: Independent

Party	Votes	%	Seats	+/–
New Patriotic Party	4,032,692	47.18	108	–20
National Democratic Congress	3,765,629	44.06	115	+21
Convention People's Party	254,097	2.97	1	–2
People's National Convention	116,940	1.37	2	–2
Democratic Freedom Party	37,599	0.44	0	New
Democratic People's Party	9,356	0.11	0	0
Reformed Patriotic Democrats	3,536	0.04	0	New
New Vision Party	773	0.01	0	New
Great Consolidated Popular Party	245	0.00	0	0
Independents	326,613	3.82	4	+3
Total	8,547,480	100.00	230	0
Valid votes	8,550,493	98.33		
Invalid/blank votes	145,422	1.67		
Total votes	8,695,915	100.00		
Registered voters/turnout	12,371,124	70.29		
Source: Electoral Commission of Ghana

==== By region ====
Party	Ashanti	Brong Ahafo	Central	Eastern	Greater Accra	Northern	Upper East	Upper West	Volta	Western	Total
National Democratic Congress	3	9	11	7	18	21	8	6	21	11	115
New Patriotic Party	34	15	8	20	9	4	4	3	1	10	108
Independent	2	0	0	1	0	1	0	0	0	0	4
People's National Convention	0	0	0	0	0	0	1	1	0	0	2
Convention People's Party	0	0	0	0	0	0	0	0	0	1	1
Total	39	24	19	28	27	26	13	10	22	22	230
Source: Electoral Commission of Ghana

==== By constituency ====
Results by constituency
Region	Constituency	Party	Votes
Ashanti	New Edubiase	National Democratic Congress	14,732
		New Patriotic Party	11,848
		People's National Convention	246
		Convention People's Party	228
		Valid votes	27,054
		Rejected votes	769
		Votes cast	27,823
		Registered voters	36,930
Ashanti	Akrofrom	New Patriotic Party	8,976
		National Democratic Congress	4,730
		Convention People's Party	719
		Independent	181
		Valid votes	14,606
		Rejected votes	218
		Votes cast	14,824
		Registered voters	20,135
Ashanti	Fomena	New Patriotic Party	11,787
		National Democratic Congress	3,430
		Convention People's Party	1,356
		Democratic People's Party	77
		Valid votes	16,650
		Rejected votes	184
		Votes cast	16,834
		Registered voters	22,569
Ashanti	Adansi Asokwa	New Patriotic Party	13,659
		National Democratic Congress	9,219
		Democratic Freedom Party	1,332
		Convention People's Party	314
		Valid votes	24,524
		Rejected votes	452
		Votes cast	24,976
		Registered voters	34,100
Ashanti	Obuasi	New Patriotic Party	46,785
		National Democratic Congress	26,169
		Convention People's Party	1,501
		People's National Convention	331
		Reformed Patriotic Democrats	152
		Democratic Freedom Party	147
		Valid votes	75,085
		Rejected votes	807
		Votes cast	75,892
		Registered voters	104,850
Ashanti	Bekwai	Independent	34,700
		New Patriotic Party	8,560
		National Democratic Congress	1,731
		Convention People's Party	171
		People's National Convention	79
		Valid votes	45,241
		Rejected votes	774
		Votes cast	46,015
		Registered voters	57,380
Ashanti	Bosome-Freho	Independent	9,140
		New Patriotic Party	8,064
		National Democratic Congress	2,189
		Democratic Freedom Party	69
		Valid votes	19,462
		Rejected votes	519
		Votes cast	19,981
		Registered voters	25,026
Ashanti	Odotobri	New Patriotic Party	22,914
		National Democratic Congress	3,146
		Convention People's Party	1,410
		People's National Convention	230
		Valid votes	27,700
		Rejected votes	664
		Votes cast	28,364
		Registered voters	36,954
Ashanti	Amansie-West	New Patriotic Party	35,274
		National Democratic Congress	6,787
		Independent	5,818
		People's National Convention	378
		Valid votes	48,257
		Rejected votes	908
		Votes cast	49,165
		Registered voters	65,173
Ashanti	Atwima Nwabiagya	New Patriotic Party	46,605
		Independent	13,912
		National Democratic Congress	12,456
		Valid votes	72,973
		Rejected votes	661
		Votes cast	73,634
		Registered voters	99,101
Ashanti	Atwima Mponua	New Patriotic Party	25,350
		National Democratic Congress	14,390
		Independent	4,212
		Convention People's Party	502
		People's National Convention	306
		Democratic People's Party	188
		Valid votes	44,948
		Rejected votes	687
		Votes cast	45,635
		Registered voters	59,112
Ashanti	Bosomtwe	New Patriotic Party	25,988
		National Democratic Congress	10,293
		People's National Convention	543
		Convention People's Party	370
		Valid votes	37,194
		Rejected votes	389
		Votes cast	37,583
		Registered voters	48,222
Ashanti	Atwima-Kwanwoma	New Patriotic Party	32,367
		National Democratic Congress	5,922
		Reformed Patriotic Democrats	1,371
		Valid votes	39,660
		Rejected votes	630
		Votes cast	40,290
		Registered voters	51,995
Ashanti	Bantama	New Patriotic Party	36,708
		National Democratic Congress	7,007
		Convention People's Party	2,677
		Independent	1,641
		Reformed Patriotic Democrats	443
		Valid votes	48,476
		Rejected votes	300
		Votes cast	48,776
		Registered voters	69,215
Ashanti	Kwadaso	New Patriotic Party	43,238
		National Democratic Congress	7,974
		Convention People's Party	696
		People's National Convention	221
		Reformed Patriotic Democrats	132
		Valid votes	52,261
		Rejected votes	249
		Votes cast	52,510
		Registered voters	75,508
Ashanti	Nhyiaeso	New Patriotic Party	36,067
		National Democratic Congress	9,426
		Convention People's Party	1,055
		Independent	790
		Reformed Patriotic Democrats	197
		Valid votes	47,535
		Rejected votes	250
		Votes cast	47,785
		Registered voters	67,540
Ashanti	Manhyia	New Patriotic Party	65,978
		National Democratic Congress	17,327
		Convention People's Party	1,347
		People's National Convention	512
		Independent	332
		Valid votes	85,496
		Rejected votes	461
		Votes cast	85,957
		Registered voters	121,082
Ashanti	Old Tafo	New Patriotic Party	36,171
		National Democratic Congress	10,386
		People's National Convention	427
		Convention People's Party	375
		Reformed Patriotic Democrats	119
		Valid votes	47,478
		Rejected votes	271
		Votes cast	47,749
		Registered voters	66,676
Ashanti	Suame	New Patriotic Party	45,235
		National Democratic Congress	9,742
		Democratic People's Party	2,409
		Convention People's Party	379
		Valid votes	57,765
		Rejected votes	395
		Votes cast	58,160
		Registered voters	82,758
Ashanti	Subin	New Patriotic Party	45,058
		National Democratic Congress	14,890
		People's National Convention	641
		Convention People's Party	606
		Valid votes	61,195
		Rejected votes	245
		Votes cast	61,440
		Registered voters	87,451
Ashanti	Asokwa	New Patriotic Party	34,801
		Independent	13,365
		Convention People's Party	7,653
		Valid votes	55,819
		Rejected votes	788
		Votes cast	56,607
		Registered voters	79,931
Ashanti	Oforikrom	New Patriotic Party	40,704
		National Democratic Congress	21,572
		Convention People's Party	1,142
		People's National Convention	1,120
		Valid votes	64,538
		Rejected votes	555
		Votes cast	65,093
		Registered voters	99,753
Ashanti	Asawase	National Democratic Congress	36,557
		New Patriotic Party	27,168
		People's National Convention	371
		Convention People's Party	261
		Democratic Freedom Party	86
		Valid votes	64,443
		Rejected votes	500
		Votes cast	64,943
		Registered voters	94,023
Ashanti	Kwabre East	New Patriotic Party	41,454
		National Democratic Congress	10,824
		Convention People's Party	1,684
		Democratic Freedom Party	555
		Valid votes	54,517
		Rejected votes	480
		Votes cast	54,997
		Registered voters	73,222
Ashanti	Kwabre West	New Patriotic Party	27,460
		People's National Convention	3,329
		Independent	1,998
		Reformed Patriotic Democrats	729
		Valid votes	33,516
		Rejected votes	479
		Votes cast	33,995
		Registered voters	46,253
Ashanti	Ejisu Juaben	New Patriotic Party	57,278
		National Democratic Congress	10,635
		Convention People's Party	1,102
		People's National Convention	544
		Valid votes	69,559
		Rejected votes	619
		Votes cast	70,178
		Registered voters	90,796
Ashanti	Asante Akim South	New Patriotic Party	23,838
		National Democratic Congress	13,843
		Convention People's Party	1,063
		Valid votes	38,744
		Rejected votes	535
		Votes cast	39,279
		Registered voters	54,041
Ashanti	Asante Akim North	New Patriotic Party	36,809
		National Democratic Congress	9,804
		Independent	7,180
		Reformed Patriotic Democrats	232
		People's National Convention	219
		Convention People's Party	163
		Valid votes	54,407
		Rejected votes	733
		Votes cast	55,140
		Registered voters	74,926
Ashanti	Effiduasi/Asokore	New Patriotic Party	18,859
		National Democratic Congress	4,456
		People's National Convention	316
		Convention People's Party	168
		Valid votes	23,799
		Rejected votes	344
		Votes cast	24,143
		Registered voters	30,862
Ashanti	Kumawu	New Patriotic Party	15,217
		Independent	7,120
		National Democratic Congress	4,278
		Convention People's Party	191
		Democratic Freedom Party	174
		Valid votes	26,980
		Rejected votes	451
		Votes cast	27,431
		Registered voters	37,846
Ashanti	Mampong	New Patriotic Party	29,916
		National Democratic Congress	7,444
		Convention People's Party	229
		Valid votes	37,589
		Rejected votes	339
		Votes cast	37,928
		Registered voters	50,667
Ashanti	Nsuta/Kwamang	New Patriotic Party	12,586
		Independent	9,223
		National Democratic Congress	2,505
		Democratic Freedom Party	71
		Convention People's Party	59
		Valid votes	24,444
		Rejected votes	518
		Votes cast	24,962
		Registered voters	34,349
Ashanti	Ejura-Sekyedumase	National Democratic Congress	20,038
		New Patriotic Party	17,312
		Independent	538
		Convention People's Party	376
		People's National Convention	218
		Democratic Freedom Party	136
		Valid votes	38,618
		Rejected votes	687
		Votes cast	39,305
		Registered voters	54,500
Ashanti	Afigya-Sekyere East	New Patriotic Party	33,080
		National Democratic Congress	9,401
		Convention People's Party	640
		People's National Convention	257
		Democratic People's Party	127
		Valid votes	43,505
		Rejected votes	334
		Votes cast	43,839
		Registered voters	5,704
Ashanti	Afigya-Sekyere West	New Patriotic Party	13,824
		National Democratic Congress	4,325
		Convention People's Party	358
		People's National Convention	240
		Valid votes	18,747
		Rejected votes	314
		Votes cast	19,061
		Registered voters	24,371
Ashanti	Offinso-South	New Patriotic Party	24,898
		National Democratic Congress	12,898
		Democratic Freedom Party	103
		People's National Convention	87
		Reformed Patriotic Democrats	63
		Valid votes	38,049
		Rejected votes	443
		Votes cast	38,492
		Registered voters	52,386
Ashanti	Offinso-North	New Patriotic Party	13,478
		National Democratic Congress	10,464
		Independent	2,135
		People's National Convention	195
		Convention People's Party	118
		Reformed Patriotic Democrats	32
		Valid votes	26,422
		Rejected votes	495
		Votes cast	26,917
		Registered voters	39,154
Ashanti	Ahafo Ano South	New Patriotic Party	21,585
		National Democratic Congress	15,008
		Independent	433
		People's National Convention	347
		Convention People's Party	327
		Independent	236
		Valid votes	37,936
		Rejected votes	607
		Votes cast	38,543
		Registered voters	50,840
Ashanti	Ahafo Ano North	New Patriotic Party	16,080
		National Democratic Congress	14,665
		People's National Convention	342
		Convention People's Party	109
		Valid votes	31,196
		Rejected votes	380
		Votes cast	31,576
		Registered voters	40,949
Brong Ahafo	Asunafo North	New Patriotic Party	24,162
		National Democratic Congress	21,069
		Convention People's Party	272
		Democratic People's Party	139
		Valid votes	45,642
		Rejected votes	685
		Votes cast	46,327
		Registered voters	63,675
Brong Ahafo	Asunafo South	New Patriotic Party	16,574
		National Democratic Congress	15,921
		People's National Convention	317
		Democratic Freedom Party	141
		Valid votes	32,953
		Rejected votes	549
		Votes cast	33,502
		Registered voters	44,162
Brong Ahafo	Asutifi South	National Democratic Congress	10,984
		New Patriotic Party	10,970
		Democratic People's Party	78
		Valid votes	22,032
		Rejected votes	245
		Votes cast	22,277
		Registered voters	27,970
Brong Ahafo	Asutifi North	New Patriotic Party	10,028
		National Democratic Congress	8,701
		Independent	1,893
		Convention People's Party	133
		Democratic Freedom Party	119
		Democratic People's Party	43
		Valid votes	20,917
		Rejected votes	313
		Votes cast	21,230
		Registered voters	26,776
Brong Ahafo	Tano South	New Patriotic Party	15,242
		National Democratic Congress	12,536
		Convention People's Party	757
		People's National Convention	287
		Valid votes	28,822
		Rejected votes	541
		Votes cast	29,363
		Registered voters	41,525
Brong Ahafo	Tano North	New Patriotic Party	17,043
		National Democratic Congress	11,120
		Convention People's Party	363
		People's National Convention	214
		Democratic Freedom Party	144
		Democratic People's Party	101
		Valid votes	28,985
		Rejected votes	333
		Votes cast	29,318
		Registered voters	40,072
Brong Ahafo	Sunyani East	New Patriotic Party	33,765
		National Democratic Congress	18,830
		People's National Convention	673
		Convention People's Party	422
		Democratic Freedom Party	154
		Valid votes	53,844
		Rejected votes	44
		Votes cast	53,888
		Registered voters	79,656
Brong Ahafo	Sunyani West	New Patriotic Party	24,048
		National Democratic Congress	14,233
		Convention People's Party	250
		People's National Convention	189
		Democratic Freedom Party	72
		Democratic People's Party	49
		Valid votes	38,841
		Rejected votes	378
		Votes cast	39,219
		Registered voters	55,206
Brong Ahafo	Berekum	New Patriotic Party	24,449
		National Democratic Congress	21,693
		Convention People's Party	755
		Democratic Freedom Party	356
		Valid votes	47,253
		Rejected votes	369
		Votes cast	47,622
		Registered voters	71,957
Brong Ahafo	Dormaa East	New Patriotic Party	11,363
		National Democratic Congress	6,485
		Democratic Freedom Party	834
		Convention People's Party	476
		Democratic People's Party	30
		Valid votes	19,188
		Rejected votes	335
		Votes cast	19,523
		Registered voters	28,846
Brong Ahafo	Dormaa West	New Patriotic Party	23,991
		National Democratic Congress	23,038
		People's National Convention	238
		Democratic Freedom Party	203
		Convention People's Party	149
		Democratic People's Party	60
		Valid votes	47,679
		Rejected votes	729
		Votes cast	48,408
		Registered voters	69,416
Brong Ahafo	Jaman South	New Patriotic Party	16,878
		National Democratic Congress	10,372
		Independent	2,654
		People's National Convention	228
		Convention People's Party	134
		Valid votes	30,266
		Rejected votes	540
		Votes cast	30,806
		Registered voters	48,005
Brong Ahafo	Jaman North	National Democratic Congress	13,359
		New Patriotic Party	10,376
		People's National Convention	252
		Convention People's Party	179
		Valid votes	24,166
		Rejected votes	451
		Votes cast	24,617
		Registered voters	39,067
Brong Ahafo	Wenchi	New Patriotic Party	18,516
		National Democratic Congress	13,495
		Democratic Freedom Party	284
		Convention People's Party	278
		Valid votes	32,573
		Rejected votes	656
		Votes cast	33,229
		Registered voters	51,858
Brong Ahafo	Tain	National Democratic Congress	14,965
		New Patriotic Party	12,048
		Independent	3,927
		Democratic People's Party	163
		Convention People's Party	135
		Valid votes	31,238
		Rejected votes	598
		Votes cast	31,836
		Registered voters	53,880
Brong Ahafo	Techiman South	National Democratic Congress	28,586
		New Patriotic Party	26,829
		People's National Convention	633
		Convention People's Party	265
		Democratic Freedom Party	165
		Valid votes	56,478
		Rejected votes	606
		Votes cast	57,084
		Registered voters	85,730
Brong Ahafo	Techiman North	New Patriotic Party	14,307
		National Democratic Congress	12,168
		Convention People's Party	223
		Democratic People's Party	85
		Valid votes	26,783
		Rejected votes	687
		Votes cast	27,470
		Registered voters	36,285
Brong Ahafo	Nkoranza South	New Patriotic Party	17,531
		National Democratic Congress	15,945
		Convention People's Party	200
		Democratic People's Party	90
		Valid votes	33,766
		Rejected votes	571
		Votes cast	34,337
		Registered voters	46,428
Brong Ahafo	Nkoranza North	New Patriotic Party	9,301
		National Democratic Congress	8,176
		Convention People's Party	418
		Democratic People's Party	67
		Valid votes	17,962
		Rejected votes	361
		Votes cast	18,323
		Registered voters	28,301
Brong Ahafo	Kintampo North	National Democratic Congress	17,965
		New Patriotic Party	13,518
		Independent	752
		Convention People's Party	327
		People's National Convention	218
		Democratic Freedom Party	107
		Valid votes	32,887
		Rejected votes	808
		Votes cast	33,695
		Registered voters	46,516
Brong Ahafo	Kintampo South	National Democratic Congress	13,009
		New Patriotic Party	10,633
		People's National Convention	279
		Valid votes	23,921
		Rejected votes	501
		Votes cast	24,422
		Registered voters	35,987
Brong Ahafo	Atebubu/Amanting	National Democratic Congress	13,743
		New Patriotic Party	10,348
		Independent	3,463
		Valid votes	27,554
		Rejected votes	1,071
		Votes cast	28,625
		Registered voters	42,958
Brong Ahafo	Pru	National Democratic Congress	13,090
		New Patriotic Party	8,994
		Independent	8,265
		Democratic People's Party	319
		Democratic Freedom Party	254
		Convention People's Party	141
		Valid votes	31,063
		Rejected votes	1,148
		Votes cast	32,211
		Registered voters	56,404
Brong Ahafo	Sene	National Democratic Congress	14,166
		New Patriotic Party	10,568
		Convention People's Party	510
		People's National Convention	346
		Democratic People's Party	334
		Valid votes	25,924
		Rejected votes	889
		Votes cast	26,813
		Registered voters	43,485
Central	Keea	National Democratic Congress	22,746
		New Patriotic Party	19,288
		Convention People's Party	4,545
		Valid votes	46,579
		Rejected votes	864
		Votes cast	47,443
		Registered voters	66,847
Central	Cape Coast	National Democratic Congress	38,694
		New Patriotic Party	31,426
		Convention People's Party	947
		Democratic Freedom Party	219
		Independent	217
		Valid votes	71,503
		Rejected votes	550
		Votes cast	72,053
		Registered voters	103,727
Central	Abura/A/Kwamankese	National Democratic Congress	19,775
		New Patriotic Party	13,221
		Convention People's Party	2,050
		Democratic Freedom Party	241
		Valid votes	35,287
		Rejected votes	929
		Votes cast	36,216
		Registered voters	52,654
Central	Mfantseman West	National Democratic Congress	25,412
		New Patriotic Party	22,236
		Convention People's Party	1,105
		Valid votes	48,753
		Rejected votes	862
		Votes cast	49,615
		Registered voters	70,095
Central	Mfantseman East	National Democratic Congress	8,591
		New Patriotic Party	7,217
		Independent	1,733
		Convention People's Party	352
		Valid votes	17,893
		Rejected votes	670
		Votes cast	18,563
		Registered voters	25,536
Central	Ajumako/Enyan/Esiam	National Democratic Congress	18,593
		New Patriotic Party	15,668
		Independent	1,040
		Convention People's Party	479
		Democratic Freedom Party	213
		Valid votes	35,993
		Rejected votes	862
		Votes cast	36,855
		Registered voters	51,759
Central	Gomoa East	National Democratic Congress	18,908
		New Patriotic Party	13,300
		Convention People's Party	2,738
		Democratic Freedom Party	266
		Valid votes	35,212
		Rejected votes	693
		Votes cast	35,905
		Registered voters	55,536
Central	Gomoa West	National Democratic Congress	15,985
		New Patriotic Party	12,511
		Independent	3,989
		Convention People's Party	860
		Democratic Freedom Party	332
		Valid votes	33,677
		Rejected votes	1,108
		Votes cast	34,785
		Registered voters	54,146
Central	Effutu	National Democratic Congress	15,297
		New Patriotic Party	12,174
		Convention People's Party	584
		Valid votes	28,055
		Rejected votes	388
		Votes cast	28,443
		Registered voters	38,737
Central	Awutu-Senya	National Democratic Congress	25,666
		New Patriotic Party	23,329
		Independent	1,062
		Convention People's Party	985
		Democratic Freedom Party	689
		Valid votes	51,731
		Rejected votes	983
		Votes cast	52,714
		Registered voters	97,870
Central	Agona West	New Patriotic Party	18,951
		National Democratic Congress	12,613
		Independent	12,526
		Convention People's Party	702
		Democratic Freedom Party	171
		Democratic People's Party	170
		Valid votes	45,133
		Rejected votes	856
		Votes cast	45,989
		Registered voters	65,408
Central	Agona East	New Patriotic Party	15,125
		National Democratic Congress	15,091
		Democratic People's Party	266
		Valid votes	30,482
		Rejected votes	636
		Votes cast	31,118
		Registered voters	43,365
Central	Asikuma/Odoben/Brakwa	New Patriotic Party	18,095
		National Democratic Congress	17,724
		Convention People's Party	720
		Democratic Freedom Party	476
		Valid votes	37,015
		Rejected votes	977
		Votes cast	37,992
		Registered voters	52,915
Central	Assin North	New Patriotic Party	24,181
		National Democratic Congress	18,834
		Convention People's Party	577
		Democratic Freedom Party	336
		Valid votes	43,928
		Rejected votes	1,025
		Votes cast	44,953
		Registered voters	64,868
Central	Assin South	New Patriotic Party	16,963
		National Democratic Congress	14,335
		Convention People's Party	403
		Democratic Freedom Party	142
		Valid votes	31,843
		Rejected votes	516
		Votes cast	32,359
		Registered voters	44,717
Central	Twifo/Ati Morkwaa	National Democratic Congress	14,724
		New Patriotic Party	13,309
		Convention People's Party	599
		Valid votes	28,632
		Rejected votes	584
		Votes cast	29,216
		Registered voters	39,062
Central	Hemang Lower Denkyira	New Patriotic Party	7,067
		Independent	6,591
		National Democratic Congress	5,699
		Convention People's Party	432
		People's National Convention	235
		Valid votes	20,024
		Rejected votes	520
		Votes cast	20,544
		Registered voters	26,799
Central	Upper Denkyira East	New Patriotic Party	17,416
		Convention People's Party	5,994
		National Democratic Congress	5,721
		People's National Convention	215
		Democratic Freedom Party	89
		Valid votes	29,435
		Rejected votes	548
		Votes cast	29,983
		Registered voters	42,721
Central	Upper Denkyira West	New Patriotic Party	9,339
		National Democratic Congress	6,992
		Convention People's Party	1,769
		Democratic Freedom Party	83
		Valid votes	18,183
		Rejected votes	306
		Votes cast	18,489
		Registered voters	23,999
Eastern	Asuogyaman	National Democratic Congress	16,608
		New Patriotic Party	15,473
		Convention People's Party	185
		People's National Convention	106
		Valid votes	32,372
		Rejected votes	401
		Votes cast	32,773
		Registered voters	48,662
Eastern	Lower Manya	National Democratic Congress	19,593
		New Patriotic Party	14,992
		Convention People's Party	288
		People's National Convention	230
		Democratic Freedom Party	58
		Valid votes	35,161
		Rejected votes	458
		Votes cast	35,619
		Registered voters	51,242
Eastern	Upper Manya	National Democratic Congress	14,398
		New Patriotic Party	6,639
		People's National Convention	315
		Convention People's Party	178
		Valid votes	21,530
		Rejected votes	385
		Votes cast	21,915
		Registered voters	35,036
Eastern	Yilo Krobo	National Democratic Congress	18,348
		New Patriotic Party	13,658
		Convention People's Party	2,598
		People's National Convention	325
		Valid votes	34,929
		Rejected votes	572
		Votes cast	35,501
		Registered voters	53,160
Eastern	New Juaben South	New Patriotic Party	34,409
		National Democratic Congress	20,848
		People's National Convention	432
		Convention People's Party	413
		Valid votes	56,102
		Rejected votes	346
		Votes cast	56,448
		Registered voters	76,120
Eastern	New Juaben North	New Patriotic Party	13,711
		National Democratic Congress	4,892
		Independent	2,783
		Independent	2,037
		Convention People's Party	285
		Valid votes	23,708
		Rejected votes	242
		Votes cast	23,950
		Registered voters	34,429
Eastern	Akropong	New Patriotic Party	20,245
		National Democratic Congress	10,524
		Convention People's Party	2,320
		Independent	968
		People's National Convention	293
		Valid votes	34,350
		Rejected votes	514
		Votes cast	34,864
		Registered voters	49,256
Eastern	Okere	New Patriotic Party	11,974
		National Democratic Congress	6,729
		Convention People's Party	839
		People's National Convention	123
		Independent	19
		Valid votes	19,684
		Rejected votes	291
		Votes cast	19,975
		Registered voters	26,737
Eastern	Aburi/Nsawam	New Patriotic Party	32,491
		National Democratic Congress	20,194
		Independent	2,545
		Convention People's Party	481
		Democratic People's Party	203
		Valid votes	55,914
		Rejected votes	765
		Votes cast	56,679
		Registered voters	78,835
Eastern	Suhum	New Patriotic Party	17,461
		National Democratic Congress	15,824
		Independent	4,705
		Convention People's Party	297
		People's National Convention	290
		Valid votes	38,577
		Rejected votes	900
		Votes cast	39,477
		Registered voters	56,447
Eastern	Ayensuono	New Patriotic Party	16,467
		National Democratic Congress	12,572
		Convention People's Party	406
		Valid votes	29,445
		Rejected votes	525
		Votes cast	29,970
		Registered voters	43,483
Eastern	Lower West Akim	New Patriotic Party	21,912
		National Democratic Congress	12,882
		Convention People's Party	812
		People's National Convention	615
		Democratic People's Party	116
		Valid votes	36,337
		Rejected votes	587
		Votes cast	36,924
		Registered voters	53,234
Eastern	Upper West Akim	National Democratic Congress	15,308
		New Patriotic Party	12,360
		Convention People's Party	416
		People's National Convention	239
		Independent	194
		Valid votes	28,517
		Rejected votes	620
		Votes cast	29,137
		Registered voters	39,433
Eastern	Akim Oda	New Patriotic Party	30,438
		National Democratic Congress	17,593
		Convention People's Party	293
		People's National Convention	192
		Democratic Freedom Party	176
		Democratic People's Party	81
		Valid votes	48,773
		Rejected votes	577
		Votes cast	49,350
		Registered voters	69,619
Eastern	Akim Swedru	New Patriotic Party	19,314
		National Democratic Congress	10,845
		Convention People's Party	230
		Valid votes	30,389
		Rejected votes	506
		Votes cast	30,895
		Registered voters	41,356
Eastern	Ofoase/Ayirebi	New Patriotic Party	14,938
		National Democratic Congress	8,716
		Convention People's Party	3,649
		People's National Convention	311
		Valid votes	27,614
		Rejected votes	668
		Votes cast	28,282
		Registered voters	40,163
Eastern	Abirem	New Patriotic Party	13,319
		National Democratic Congress	7,430
		Convention People's Party	1,213
		Valid votes	21,962
		Rejected votes	350
		Votes cast	22,312
		Registered voters	30,405
Eastern	Kade	New Patriotic Party	22,081
		National Democratic Congress	10,229
		Convention People's Party	2,287
		People's National Convention	342
		Votes difference	3,013
		Valid votes	37,952
		Rejected votes	532
		Votes cast	38,484
Eastern	Akwatia	New Patriotic Party	17,900
		National Democratic Congress	15,860
		Independent	1,835
		Convention People's Party	109
		Independent	64
		Valid votes	35,768
		Rejected votes	339
		Votes cast	36,107
		Registered voters	49,203
Eastern	Akim Abuakwa South	New Patriotic Party	22,681
		National Democratic Congress	6,757
		Independent	671
		Valid votes	30,109
		Rejected votes	307
		Votes cast	30,416
		Registered voters	42,149
Eastern	Akim Abuakwa North	New Patriotic Party	14,820
		National Democratic Congress	9,750
		Convention People's Party	259
		People's National Convention	242
		Valid votes	25,071
		Rejected votes	285
		Votes cast	25,356
		Registered voters	36,824
Eastern	Atiwa	New Patriotic Party	26,423
		National Democratic Congress	7,851
		Convention People's Party	296
		Valid votes	34,570
		Rejected votes	361
		Votes cast	34,931
		Registered voters	47,107
Eastern	Fanteakwa	New Patriotic Party	19,935
		National Democratic Congress	14,689
		Convention People's Party	181
		Democratic Freedom Party	150
		Valid votes	34,955
		Rejected votes	469
		Votes cast	35,424
		Registered voters	50,183
Eastern	Mpraeso	New Patriotic Party	17,519
		National Democratic Congress	7,592
		Convention People's Party	357
		Valid votes	25,468
		Rejected votes	363
		Votes cast	25,831
		Registered voters	38,347
Eastern	Abetifi	New Patriotic Party	16,491
		National Democratic Congress	6,767
		Convention People's Party	436
		People's National Convention	246
		Valid votes	23,940
		Rejected votes	416
		Votes cast	24,356
		Registered voters	37,835
Eastern	Nkawkaw	Independent	21,640
		New Patriotic Party	15,796
		National Democratic Congress	2,158
		Convention People's Party	239
		People's National Convention	101
		Democratic Freedom Party	70
		Valid votes	40,004
		Rejected votes	619
		Votes cast	40,623
		Registered voters	57,916
Eastern	Afram Plains South	National Democratic Congress	12,132
		New Patriotic Party	6,679
		Convention People's Party	223
		Valid votes	19,034
		Rejected votes	358
		Votes cast	19,392
		Registered voters	30,426
Eastern	Afram Plains North	National Democratic Congress	14,722
		New Patriotic Party	4,589
		Convention People's Party	209
		Democratic Freedom Party	169
		Valid votes	19,689
		Rejected votes	444
		Votes cast	20,133
		Registered voters	32,893
Greater Accra	Trobu-Amasaman	National Democratic Congress	34,797
		New Patriotic Party	31,945
		Convention People's Party	3,571
		People's National Convention	656
		Democratic Freedom Party	124
		Valid votes	71,093
		Rejected votes	634
		Votes cast	71,727
		Registered voters	109,530
Greater Accra	Domeabra-Obom	National Democratic Congress	11,312
		New Patriotic Party	3,346
		Democratic Freedom Party	544
		Convention People's Party	301
		Valid votes	15,503
		Rejected votes	363
		Votes cast	15,866
		Registered voters	23,633
Greater Accra	Weija	New Patriotic Party	63,377
		National Democratic Congress	51,961
		Convention People's Party	2,105
		Democratic Freedom Party	358
		Democratic People's Party	113
		Valid votes	117,914
		Rejected votes	900
		Votes cast	118,814
		Registered voters	185,627
Greater Accra	Abokobi-Madina	National Democratic Congress	34,073
		New Patriotic Party	27,308
		Valid votes	61,381
		Rejected votes	386
		Votes cast	61,767
		Registered voters	92,014
Greater Accra	Dome-Kwabenya	New Patriotic Party	35,561
		National Democratic Congress	24,409
		Convention People's Party	1,292
		People's National Convention	439
		Democratic Freedom Party	81
		Democratic People's Party	52
		Valid votes	61,834
		Rejected votes	0
		Votes cast	61,834
		Registered voters	94,495
Greater Accra	Okaikwei South	New Patriotic Party	35,438
		National Democratic Congress	25,819
		Convention People's Party	3,428
		Democratic Freedom Party	231
		Valid votes	64,916
		Rejected votes	411
		Votes cast	65,327
		Registered voters	97,897
Greater Accra	Okaikwei North	New Patriotic Party	44,172
		National Democratic Congress	41,342
		Convention People's Party	2,052
		People's National Convention	895
		Democratic Freedom Party	499
		Valid votes	88,960
		Rejected votes	610
		Votes cast	89,570
		Registered voters	133,865
Greater Accra	Ablekuma North	New Patriotic Party	45,630
		National Democratic Congress	30,150
		Convention People's Party	1,512
		Independent	1,165
		People's National Convention	766
		Valid votes	79,223
		Rejected votes	569
		Votes cast	79,792
		Registered voters	121,281
Greater Accra	Ablekuma Central	National Democratic Congress	43,253
		New Patriotic Party	39,179
		People's National Convention	1,213
		Convention People's Party	999
		Democratic People's Party	141
		Valid votes	84,785
		Rejected votes	634
		Votes cast	85,419
		Registered voters	127,678
Greater Accra	Ablekuma South	National Democratic Congress	56,162
		New Patriotic Party	50,879
		People's National Convention	915
		Convention People's Party	837
		Democratic Freedom Party	314
		Independent	313
		Democratic People's Party	90
		Valid votes	109,510
		Rejected votes	1,034
		Votes cast	110,544
		Registered voters	161,436
Greater Accra	Odododiodo	National Democratic Congress	34,182
		New Patriotic Party	25,495
		Convention People's Party	703
		People's National Convention	595
		Democratic Freedom Party	309
		Democratic People's Party	113
		Valid votes	61,397
		Rejected votes	216
		Votes cast	61,613
		Registered voters	93,528
Greater Accra	Klottey Korle	National Democratic Congress	30,359
		New Patriotic Party	27,713
		Convention People's Party	1,807
		Valid votes	59,879
		Rejected votes	441
		Votes cast	60,320
		Registered voters	90,078
Greater Accra	Ayawaso East	National Democratic Congress	44,655
		New Patriotic Party	26,020
		Independent	3,652
		Convention People's Party	1,754
		People's National Convention	747
		Democratic Freedom Party	593
		New Vision Party	385
		Independent	314
		Valid votes	78,120
		Rejected votes	7,291
		Votes cast	85,411
		Registered voters	115,454
Greater Accra	Ayawaso West-Wuogon	New Patriotic Party	24,603
		National Democratic Congress	21,564
		Convention People's Party	7,910
		Independent	2,547
		People's National Convention	374
		Democratic Freedom Party	277
		Valid votes	57,275
		Rejected votes	321
		Votes cast	57,596
		Registered voters	79,746
Greater Accra	Ayawaso Central	New Patriotic Party	30,915
		National Democratic Congress	30,058
		Convention People's Party	1,160
		People's National Convention	622
		Democratic Freedom Party	205
		Valid votes	62,960
		Rejected votes	212
		Votes cast	63,172
		Registered voters	94,340
Greater Accra	Dade Kotopon	National Democratic Congress	42,678
		New Patriotic Party	30,077
		Convention People's Party	1,744
		Valid votes	74,499
		Rejected votes	382
		Votes cast	74,881
		Registered voters	108,555
Greater Accra	Ledzokuku	National Democratic Congress	42,087
		New Patriotic Party	30,262
		Convention People's Party	832
		Independent	612
		Democratic Freedom Party	110
		New Vision Party	86
		Valid votes	73,989
		Rejected votes	599
		Votes cast	74,588
		Registered voters	108,283
Greater Accra	Krowor	National Democratic Congress	27,339
		New Patriotic Party	21,136
		Convention People's Party	1,530
		Valid votes	50,005
		Rejected votes	332
		Votes cast	50,337
		Registered voters	78,565
Greater Accra	Tema East	New Patriotic Party	40,444
		National Democratic Congress	33,011
		Convention People's Party	7,852
		Independent	519
		Valid votes	81,826
		Rejected votes	798
		Votes cast	82,624
		Registered voters	122,586
Greater Accra	Tema West	New Patriotic Party	39,070
		National Democratic Congress	30,434
		Convention People's Party	1,382
		Valid votes	70,886
		Rejected votes	234
		Votes cast	71,120
		Registered voters	104,954
Greater Accra	Ashaiman	National Democratic Congress	51,556
		New Patriotic Party	32,613
		People's National Convention	558
		Convention People's Party	534
		Democratic Freedom Party	198
		Valid votes	85,459
		Rejected votes	741
		Votes cast	86,200
		Registered voters	133,054
Greater Accra	Adenta	National Democratic Congress	20,329
		New Patriotic Party	16,873
		Convention People's Party	703
		Valid votes	37,905
		Rejected votes	243
		Votes cast	38,148
		Registered voters	60,859
Greater Accra	Kpone-Katamansu	National Democratic Congress	20,709
		New Patriotic Party	10,680
		Convention People's Party	1,504
		Valid votes	32,893
		Rejected votes	227
		Votes cast	33,120
		Registered voters	50,383
Greater Accra	Shai Osudoku	National Democratic Congress	14,725
		New Patriotic Party	5,565
		Convention People's Party	1,876
		People's National Convention	280
		Valid votes	22,446
		Rejected votes	308
		Votes cast	22,754
		Registered voters	31,418
Greater Accra	Ningo-Prampram	National Democratic Congress	18,339
		New Patriotic Party	6,196
		Independent	639
		Convention People's Party	487
		Valid votes	25,661
		Rejected votes	367
		Votes cast	26,028
		Registered voters	38,138
Greater Accra	Ada	National Democratic Congress	16,538
		New Patriotic Party	3,843
		Convention People's Party	409
		Valid votes	20,790
		Rejected votes	257
		Votes cast	21,047
		Registered voters	30,526
Greater Accra	Sege	National Democratic Congress	12,451
		New Patriotic Party	6,269
		Convention People's Party	239
		People's National Convention	223
		Valid votes	19,182
		Rejected votes	450
		Votes cast	19,632
		Registered voters	26,816
Northern	Bole	National Democratic Congress	11,452
		New Patriotic Party	5,784
		Convention People's Party	189
		People's National Convention	160
		Independent	94
		Valid votes	17,679
		Rejected votes	552
		Votes cast	18,231
		Registered voters	27,119
Northern	Salwa-Tuna-Kalba	National Democratic Congress	12,290
		New Patriotic Party	8,068
		People's National Convention	313
		Convention People's Party	237
		Democratic Freedom Party	142
		Valid votes	21,050
		Rejected votes	1,301
		Votes cast	22,351
		Registered voters	36,851
Northern	Damongo/Daboya	National Democratic Congress	12,450
		New Patriotic Party	9,996
		Convention People's Party	2,071
		Democratic Freedom Party	395
		People's National Convention	289
		Democratic People's Party	163
		Valid votes	25,364
		Rejected votes	943
		Votes cast	26,307
		Registered voters	37,346
Northern	Yapei/Kusawgu	National Democratic Congress	12,517
		New Patriotic Party	12,372
		People's National Convention	318
		Democratic Freedom Party	288
		Convention People's Party	164
		Democratic People's Party	53
		Valid votes	25,712
		Rejected votes	857
		Votes cast	26,569
		Registered voters	39,753
Northern	Salaga	National Democratic Congress	19,714
		New Patriotic Party	16,837
		People's National Convention	219
		Democratic Freedom Party	150
		Convention People's Party	136
		Democratic People's Party	45
		Valid votes	37,101
		Rejected votes	704
		Votes cast	37,805
		Registered voters	50,032
Northern	Kpandai	National Democratic Congress	10,391
		New Patriotic Party	9,839
		Independent	2,922
		Independent	2,054
		Independent	1,685
		Independent	752
		Convention People's Party	262
		Valid votes	27,905
		Rejected votes	1,088
		Votes cast	28,993
		Registered voters	39,715
Northern	Bimbila	New Patriotic Party	27,195
		National Democratic Congress	16,005
		Democratic Freedom Party	391
		People's National Convention	292
		Democratic People's Party	123
		Valid votes	44,006
		Rejected votes	856
		Votes cast	44,862
		Registered voters	56,284
Northern	Wulensi	Independent	10,174
		New Patriotic Party	8,538
		National Democratic Congress	8,335
		Convention People's Party	196
		People's National Convention	171
		Valid votes	27,414
		Rejected votes	1,105
		Votes cast	28,519
		Registered voters	36,418
Northern	Zabzugu/Tatale	New Patriotic Party	18,760
		National Democratic Congress	11,218
		Convention People's Party	2,374
		People's National Convention	258
		Democratic Freedom Party	86
		Valid votes	32,696
		Rejected votes	1,161
		Votes cast	33,857
		Registered voters	43,552
Northern	Yendi	National Democratic Congress	11,299
		New Patriotic Party	10,539
		Independent	7,288
		Democratic Freedom Party	777
		Convention People's Party	164
		People's National Convention	123
		Independent	51
		Valid votes	30,241
		Rejected votes	580
		Votes cast	30,821
		Registered voters	39,236
Northern	Mion	National Democratic Congress	12,050
		New Patriotic Party	11,815
		Democratic Freedom Party	2,522
		Independent	1,027
		Convention People's Party	752
		Valid votes	28,166
		Rejected votes	884
		Votes cast	29,050
		Registered voters	39,956
Northern	Saboba	National Democratic Congress	10,331
		New Patriotic Party	8,944
		Convention People's Party	993
		Democratic Freedom Party	571
		Valid votes	20,839
		Rejected votes	640
		Votes cast	21,479
		Registered voters	26,423
Northern	Chereponi	New Patriotic Party	9,188
		National Democratic Congress	7,648
		Convention People's Party	437
		People's National Convention	286
		Valid votes	17,559
		Rejected votes	1,056
		Votes cast	18,615
		Registered voters	23,270
Northern	Gusheiegu	National Democratic Congress	14,732
		New Patriotic Party	14,035
		People's National Convention	194
		Democratic Freedom Party	135
		Convention People's Party	131
		Democratic People's Party	51
		Valid votes	29,278
		Rejected votes	1,180
		Votes cast	30,458
		Registered voters	37,958
Northern	Karaga	National Democratic Congress	13,352
		New Patriotic Party	9,333
		People's National Convention	301
		Democratic Freedom Party	264
		Democratic People's Party	105
		Convention People's Party	86
		Valid votes	23,441
		Rejected votes	695
		Votes cast	24,136
		Registered voters	32,050
Northern	Savelugu	National Democratic Congress	17,056
		New Patriotic Party	10,622
		Independent	852
		Convention People's Party	366
		People's National Convention	183
		Democratic Freedom Party	173
		New Vision Party	160
		Democratic People's Party	158
		Valid votes	29,570
		Rejected votes	710
		Votes cast	30,280
		Registered voters	38,520
Northern	Nanton	New Patriotic Party	6,868
		National Democratic Congress	6,177
		Convention People's Party	1,630
		Democratic Freedom Party	177
		People's National Convention	100
		Valid votes	14,952
		Rejected votes	476
		Votes cast	15,428
		Registered voters	18,825
Northern	Tamale South	National Democratic Congress	44,332
		New Patriotic Party	11,356
		Convention People's Party	717
		Democratic People's Party	213
		Valid votes	56,618
		Rejected votes	605
		Votes cast	57,223
		Registered voters	78,168
Northern	Tamale Central	National Democratic Congress	40,625
		New Patriotic Party	19,483
		Convention People's Party	918
		People's National Convention	408
		Democratic Freedom Party	248
		Reformed Patriotic Democrats	66
		Democratic People's Party	59
		New Vision Party	44
		Valid votes	61,851
		Rejected votes	441
		Votes cast	62,292
		Registered voters	84,346
Northern	Tamale North	National Democratic Congress	31,127
		Independent	11,254
		New Patriotic Party	11,171
		Convention People's Party	610
		People's National Convention	501
		Democratic Freedom Party	199
		New Vision Party	98
		Valid votes	54,960
		Rejected votes	712
		Votes cast	55,672
		Registered voters	75,276
Northern	Tolon	National Democratic Congress	16,993
		New Patriotic Party	16,499
		Democratic Freedom Party	580
		People's National Convention	373
		Valid votes	34,445
		Rejected votes	0
		Votes cast	34,445
		Registered voters	46,223
Northern	Kumbungu	National Democratic Congress	18,155
		New Patriotic Party	6,096
		Convention People's Party	2,512
		Valid votes	26,763
		Rejected votes	567
		Votes cast	27,330
		Registered voters	36,459
Northern	Walewale	National Democratic Congress	13,839
		New Patriotic Party	12,828
		People's National Convention	7,020
		Convention People's Party	265
		Democratic Freedom Party	161
		Valid votes	34,113
		Rejected votes	1,013
		Votes cast	35,126
		Registered voters	45,756
Northern	Yagaba/Kubori	National Democratic Congress	6,460
		New Patriotic Party	5,130
		Democratic Freedom Party	288
		People's National Convention	202
		Valid votes	12,080
		Rejected votes	223
		Votes cast	12,303
		Registered voters	16,261
Northern	Gambaga	National Democratic Congress	15,443
		New Patriotic Party	11,437
		People's National Convention	7,227
		Independent	406
		Democratic Freedom Party	188
		Valid votes	34,701
		Rejected votes	1,098
		Votes cast	35,799
		Registered voters	47,802
Northern	Bunkpurugu	National Democratic Congress	9,205
		New Patriotic Party	6,800
		Independent	6,395
		Independent	5,875
		People's National Convention	2,425
		Independent	915
		Democratic Freedom Party	301
		Convention People's Party	162
		Valid votes	32,078
		Rejected votes	1,037
		Votes cast	33,115
		Registered voters	43,998
Upper East	Builsa North	National Democratic Congress	8,259
		New Patriotic Party	6,988
		People's National Convention	3,361
		Convention People's Party	557
		Valid votes	19,165
		Rejected votes	688
		Votes cast	19,853
		Registered voters	26,249
Upper East	Builsa South	People's National Convention	4,047
		National Democratic Congress	3,988
		New Patriotic Party	2,938
		Convention People's Party	58
		Democratic Freedom Party	39
		Democratic People's Party	22
		Valid votes	11,092
		Rejected votes	487
		Votes cast	11,579
		Registered voters	15,664
Upper East	Chiana-Paga	New Patriotic Party	8,323
		National Democratic Congress	7,380
		Independent	6,567
		People's National Convention	5,464
		Convention People's Party	105
		Valid votes	27,839
		Rejected votes	884
		Votes cast	28,723
		Registered voters	43,917
Upper East	Navrongo Central	New Patriotic Party	14,354
		National Democratic Congress	13,224
		People's National Convention	4,026
		Convention People's Party	133
		Valid votes	31,737
		Rejected votes	870
		Votes cast	32,607
		Registered voters	43,917
Upper East	Bolgatanga	National Democratic Congress	28,656
		New Patriotic Party	10,063
		People's National Convention	10,009
		Convention People's Party	640
		Democratic Freedom Party	229
		Democratic People's Party	97
		Valid votes	49,694
		Rejected votes	1,172
		Votes cast	50,866
		Registered voters	73,299
Upper East	Bongo	National Democratic Congress	17,073
		New Patriotic Party	9,817
		People's National Convention	2,973
		Convention People's Party	286
		Valid votes	30,149
		Rejected votes	892
		Votes cast	31,041
		Registered voters	43,232
Upper East	Zebilla	National Democratic Congress	13,074
		New Patriotic Party	10,470
		Independent	6,701
		Independent	1,461
		Convention People's Party	273
		Democratic People's Party	236
		Valid votes	32,215
		Rejected votes	1,019
		Votes cast	33,234
		Registered voters	44,261
Upper East	Bawku Central	New Patriotic Party	20,157
		National Democratic Congress	17,385
		Democratic Freedom Party	71
		People's National Convention	54
		Convention People's Party	52
		Valid votes	37,719
		Rejected votes	50
		Votes cast	37,769
		Registered voters	56,996
Upper East	Pusiga	National Democratic Congress	8,803
		New Patriotic Party	5,021
		Convention People's Party	1,469
		People's National Convention	391
		Valid votes	15,684
		Rejected votes	816
		Votes cast	16,500
		Registered voters	27,555
Upper East	Binduri	New Patriotic Party	9,103
		National Democratic Congress	8,357
		People's National Convention	292
		Democratic Freedom Party	120
		Convention People's Party	103
		Democratic People's Party	75
		Valid votes	18,050
		Rejected votes	603
		Votes cast	18,653
		Registered voters	27,610
Upper East	Garu/Tempane	National Democratic Congress	16,318
		New Patriotic Party	15,650
		Democratic Freedom Party	1,241
		Convention People's Party	471
		People's National Convention	445
		Valid votes	34,125
		Rejected votes	1,235
		Votes cast	35,360
		Registered voters	51,624
Upper East	Talensi	National Democratic Congress	9,548
		New Patriotic Party	7,496
		People's National Convention	4,394
		Democratic Freedom Party	148
		Valid votes	21,586
		Rejected votes	872
		Votes cast	22,458
		Registered voters	31,993
Upper East	Nabdam	National Democratic Congress	5,369
		New Patriotic Party	5,097
		People's National Convention	715
		Convention People's Party	49
		Valid votes	11,230
		Rejected votes	258
		Votes cast	11,488
		Registered voters	15,611
Upper West	Wa Central	National Democratic Congress	25,428
		New Patriotic Party	17,309
		People's National Convention	806
		Convention People's Party	391
		Democratic Freedom Party	210
		Democratic People's Party	58
		Valid votes	44,202
		Rejected votes	892
		Votes cast	45,094
		Registered voters	62,896
Upper West	Wa West	National Democratic Congress	10,468
		Independent	5,541
		New Patriotic Party	4,455
		People's National Convention	243
		Convention People's Party	241
		Democratic People's Party	118
		Valid votes	21,066
		Rejected votes	1,146
		Votes cast	22,212
		Registered voters	33,611
Upper West	Wa East	New Patriotic Party	10,047
		National Democratic Congress	9,037
		Independent	1,319
		People's National Convention	371
		Convention People's Party	140
		Valid votes	20,914
		Rejected votes	1,023
		Votes cast	21,937
		Registered voters	32,298
Upper West	Nadowli West	National Democratic Congress	12,997
		New Patriotic Party	3,676
		Independent	2,931
		Democratic Freedom Party	844
		People's National Convention	471
		Convention People's Party	87
		Valid votes	21,006
		Rejected votes	615
		Votes cast	21,621
		Registered voters	32,956
Upper West	Nadowli East	National Democratic Congress	4,789
		New Patriotic Party	4,676
		Democratic Freedom Party	428
		People's National Convention	165
		Convention People's Party	66
		Valid votes	10,124
		Rejected votes	328
		Votes cast	10,452
		Registered voters	15,648
Upper West	Jirapa	National Democratic Congress	12,791
		New Patriotic Party	6,944
		People's National Convention	432
		Democratic People's Party	127
		Convention People's Party	119
		Valid votes	20,413
		Rejected votes	460
		Votes cast	20,873
		Registered voters	34,258
Upper West	Lambussie	New Patriotic Party	6,513
		National Democratic Congress	4,716
		People's National Convention	261
		Convention People's Party	141
		Democratic Freedom Party	124
		Valid votes	11,755
		Rejected votes	412
		Votes cast	12,167
		Registered voters	18,875
Upper West	Lawra	New Patriotic Party	14,742
		National Democratic Congress	13,783
		Democratic Freedom Party	1,428
		People's National Convention	566
		Democratic People's Party	507
		Convention People's Party	288
		Valid votes	31,314
		Rejected votes	1,340
		Votes cast	32,654
		Registered voters	48,036
Upper West	Sissala West	People's National Convention	6,001
		National Democratic Congress	5,527
		New Patriotic Party	4,555
		Convention People's Party	197
		Democratic Freedom Party	72
		Valid votes	16,352
		Rejected votes	666
		Votes cast	17,018
		Registered voters	23,151
Upper West	Sissala East	National Democratic Congress	7,050
		People's National Convention	6,798
		New Patriotic Party	5,126
		Valid votes	18,974
		Rejected votes	703
		Votes cast	19,677
		Registered voters	27,105
Volta	Keta	National Democratic Congress	27,247
		New Patriotic Party	1,406
		Convention People's Party	1,093
		People's National Convention	437
		Valid votes	30,183
		Rejected votes	288
		Votes cast	30,471
		Registered voters	42,303
Volta	Anlo	National Democratic Congress	29,185
		New Patriotic Party	1,361
		Convention People's Party	813
		People's National Convention	263
		Democratic Freedom Party	147
		Valid votes	31,769
		Rejected votes	389
		Votes cast	32,158
		Registered voters	46,653
Volta	Ketu South	National Democratic Congress	54,720
		New Patriotic Party	3,446
		Convention People's Party	1,287
		People's National Convention	1,142
		Democratic Freedom Party	416
		Valid votes	61,011
		Rejected votes	799
		Votes cast	61,810
		Registered voters	98,283
Volta	Ketu North	National Democratic Congress	24,124
		New Patriotic Party	10,894
		People's National Convention	316
		Democratic People's Party	102
		Convention People's Party	101
		Valid votes	35,537
		Rejected votes	570
		Votes cast	36,107
		Registered voters	53,159
Volta	Avenor-Ave	National Democratic Congress	23,419
		Independent	6,552
		New Patriotic Party	1,955
		Democratic Freedom Party	1,776
		Convention People's Party	619
		Democratic People's Party	70
		Valid votes	34,391
		Rejected votes	785
		Votes cast	35,176
		Registered voters	54,440
Volta	South Tongu	National Democratic Congress	28,193
		New Patriotic Party	2,675
		Independent	1,295
		Convention People's Party	413
		Democratic Freedom Party	169
		Valid votes	32,745
		Rejected votes	328
		Votes cast	33,073
		Registered voters	44,946
Volta	Central Tongu	National Democratic Congress	16,598
		New Patriotic Party	4,110
		Convention People's Party	1,998
		Democratic Freedom Party	155
		Valid votes	22,861
		Rejected votes	417
		Votes cast	23,278
		Registered voters	32,743
Volta	North Tongu	National Democratic Congress	22,876
		New Patriotic Party	4,065
		Convention People's Party	2,042
		Democratic Freedom Party	133
		Valid votes	29,116
		Rejected votes	369
		Votes cast	29,485
		Registered voters	41,352
Volta	Ho East	National Democratic Congress	13,118
		Independent	9,262
		New Patriotic Party	736
		Convention People's Party	241
		People's National Convention	137
		Democratic Freedom Party	135
		Valid votes	23,629
		Rejected votes	384
		Votes cast	24,013
		Registered voters	35,233
Volta	Ho Central	National Democratic Congress	47,036
		New Patriotic Party	6,228
		People's National Convention	404
		Convention People's Party	371
		Democratic Freedom Party	288
		Valid votes	54,327
		Rejected votes	407
		Votes cast	54,734
		Registered voters	82,031
Volta	Ho West	National Democratic Congress	24,677
		New Patriotic Party	3,226
		Convention People's Party	313
		Valid votes	28,216
		Rejected votes	303
		Votes cast	28,519
		Registered voters	44,155
Volta	South Dayi	National Democratic Congress	13,654
		New Patriotic Party	1,381
		Democratic Freedom Party	570
		Valid votes	15,605
		Rejected votes	148
		Votes cast	15,753
		Registered voters	25,203
Volta	North Dayi	National Democratic Congress	26,734
		New Patriotic Party	6,237
		Convention People's Party	1,766
		Democratic Freedom Party	138
		Valid votes	34,875
		Rejected votes	298
		Votes cast	35,173
		Registered voters	54,034
Volta	Hohoe North	National Democratic Congress	28,169
		New Patriotic Party	8,224
		Democratic Freedom Party	1,242
		Convention People's Party	366
		People's National Convention	314
		Valid votes	38,315
		Rejected votes	395
		Votes cast	38,710
		Registered voters	62,979
Volta	Hohoe South	National Democratic Congress	18,340
		New Patriotic Party	1,489
		Democratic Freedom Party	677
		Democratic People's Party	99
		Valid votes	20,605
		Rejected votes	152
		Votes cast	20,757
		Registered voters	31,498
Volta	Buem	National Democratic Congress	12,766
		New Patriotic Party	5,340
		Independent	755
		Democratic Freedom Party	353
		Convention People's Party	179
		Valid votes	19,393
		Rejected votes	203
		Votes cast	19,596
		Registered voters	30,067
Volta	Biakoye	National Democratic Congress	16,083
		New Patriotic Party	7,126
		Convention People's Party	666
		Democratic Freedom Party	275
		Democratic People's Party	57
		Valid votes	24,207
		Rejected votes	326
		Votes cast	24,533
		Registered voters	35,737
Volta	Akan	National Democratic Congress	13,730
		New Patriotic Party	7,989
		Independent	791
		Independent	362
		People's National Convention	263
		Convention People's Party	121
		Democratic Freedom Party	97
		Independent	85
		Valid votes	23,438
		Rejected votes	425
		Votes cast	23,863
		Registered voters	37,240
Volta	Krachi East	National Democratic Congress	12,340
		New Patriotic Party	8,263
		Convention People's Party	947
		Democratic Freedom Party	146
		Valid votes	21,696
		Rejected votes	431
		Votes cast	22,127
		Registered voters	33,268
Volta	Krachi West	National Democratic Congress	14,229
		New Patriotic Party	10,437
		Independent	7,953
		Convention People's Party	648
		Democratic People's Party	602
		Valid votes	33,869
		Rejected votes	988
		Votes cast	34,857
		Registered voters	51,528
Volta	Nkwanta North	New Patriotic Party	9,426
		People's National Convention	8,680
		National Democratic Congress	3,241
		Independent	308
		Valid votes	21,655
		Rejected votes	556
		Votes cast	22,211
		Registered voters	29,233
Volta	Nkwanta South	National Democratic Congress	18,171
		New Patriotic Party	12,271
		Independent	440
		Independent	358
		Independent	239
		Valid votes	31,479
		Rejected votes	624
		Votes cast	32,103
		Registered voters	46,037
Western	Jomoro	Convention People's Party	19,916
		National Democratic Congress	13,345
		New Patriotic Party	6,345
		People's National Convention	220
		Valid votes	39,826
		Rejected votes	490
		Votes cast	40,316
		Registered voters	66,369
Western	Evalue Gwira	New Patriotic Party	11,641
		National Democratic Congress	6,224
		Convention People's Party	2,314
		Valid votes	20,179
		Rejected votes	544
		Votes cast	20,723
		Registered voters	32,183
		National Democratic Congress	14,077
		Convention People's Party	12,428
		Independent	2,918
		Independent	168
		Independent	121
		Valid votes	29,712
		Rejected votes	5,590
		Votes cast	35,302
		Registered voters	48,426
Western	Ahanta West	New Patriotic Party	20,871
		National Democratic Congress	9,393
		Convention People's Party	6,745
		Democratic Freedom Party	1,789
		Valid votes	38,798
		Rejected votes	863
		Votes cast	39,661
		Registered voters	55,903
Western	Takoradi	New Patriotic Party	22,704
		National Democratic Congress	11,661
		Convention People's Party	3,851
		Independent	343
		Valid votes	38,559
		Rejected votes	272
		Votes cast	38,831
		Registered voters	56,576
Western	Effia Kwesimintim	New Patriotic Party	27,998
		National Democratic Congress	13,957
		Convention People's Party	12,996
		Independent	704
		People's National Convention	561
		Great Consolidated Popular Party	183
		Valid votes	56,399
		Rejected votes	725
		Votes cast	57,124
		Registered voters	89,427
Western	Sekondi	New Patriotic Party	13,005
		National Democratic Congress	9,578
		Convention People's Party	727
		People's National Convention	88
		Democratic Freedom Party	72
		Valid votes	23,470
		Rejected votes	202
		Votes cast	23,672
		Registered voters	37,589
Western	Esikadu/Ketan	New Patriotic Party	19,994
		National Democratic Congress	11,332
		Convention People's Party	1,314
		People's National Convention	272
		Valid votes	32,912
		Rejected votes	464
		Votes cast	33,376
		Registered voters	50,517
Western	Shama	National Democratic Congress	14,508
		New Patriotic Party	13,702
		Convention People's Party	1,126
		People's National Convention	254
		Great Consolidated Popular Party	62
		Valid votes	29,652
		Rejected votes	490
		Votes cast	30,142
		Registered voters	42,735
Western	Mpohor Wassa	New Patriotic Party	16,014
		National Democratic Congress	14,503
		Convention People's Party	7,419
		Valid votes	37,936
		Rejected votes	938
		Votes cast	38,874
		Registered voters	57,385
Western	Tarkwa-Nsuaem	New Patriotic Party	30,610
		National Democratic Congress	19,596
		Convention People's Party	2,903
		Valid votes	53,109
		Rejected votes	572
		Votes cast	53,681
		Registered voters	79,732
Western	Prestea/Huni-Valley	National Democratic Congress	21,887
		New Patriotic Party	18,077
		Convention People's Party	11,552
		Democratic Freedom Party	706
		Democratic People's Party	314
		Independent	279
		Valid votes	52,815
		Rejected votes	827
		Votes cast	53,642
		Registered voters	79,792
Western	Amenfi Central	National Democratic Congress	11,324
		New Patriotic Party	9,578
		Independent	7,701
		Convention People's Party	205
		Valid votes	28,808
		Rejected votes	755
		Votes cast	29,563
		Registered voters	41,609
Western	Amenfi West	National Democratic Congress	18,383
		New Patriotic Party	13,070
		Convention People's Party	405
		Valid votes	31,858
		Rejected votes	514
		Votes cast	32,372
		Registered voters	46,015
Western	Amenfi East	New Patriotic Party	18,576
		National Democratic Congress	16,243
		Convention People's Party	1,013
		Valid votes	35,832
		Rejected votes	566
		Votes cast	36,398
		Registered voters	50,915
Western	Aowin	National Democratic Congress	19,291
		New Patriotic Party	15,393
		People's National Convention	631
		Convention People's Party	347
		Valid votes	35,662
		Rejected votes	768
		Votes cast	36,430
		Registered voters	57,192
Western	Suaman	National Democratic Congress	5,193
		New Patriotic Party	4,435
		Convention People's Party	205
		People's National Convention	123
		Valid votes	9,956
		Rejected votes	162
		Votes cast	10,118
		Registered voters	16,953
Western	Bibiani-Anhwiaso-Bekwai	New Patriotic Party	24,241
		National Democratic Congress	22,014
		Democratic Freedom Party	1,289
		Convention People's Party	1,080
		Valid votes	48,624
		Rejected votes	651
		Votes cast	49,275
		Registered voters	61,244
Western	Sefwi Wiawso	National Democratic Congress	22,556
		New Patriotic Party	22,156
		Convention People's Party	517
		Valid votes	45,229
		Rejected votes	1,001
		Votes cast	46,230
		Registered voters	58,302
Western	Sefwi Akontombra	National Democratic Congress	12,786
		New Patriotic Party	10,470
		Democratic Freedom Party	236
		Valid votes	23,492
		Rejected votes	349
		Votes cast	23,841
		Registered voters	33,044
Western	Juaboso	National Democratic Congress	30,717
		New Patriotic Party	13,098
		Convention People's Party	1,629
		People's National Convention	679
		Valid votes	46,123
		Rejected votes	903
		Votes cast	47,026
		Registered voters	71,788
Western	Bia	National Democratic Congress	29,380
		New Patriotic Party	14,775
		Independent	1,427
		Convention People's Party	584
		Democratic Freedom Party	571
		Democratic People's Party	198
		Valid votes	46,935
		Rejected votes	1,397
		Votes cast	48,332
		Registered voters	80,432

== Aftermath ==
The effective management of the 2008 election by the Electoral Commission of Ghana, raised interest for African and international election reformers. In November 2009, a conference was held to analyze the 2008 election, and try to establish new standards and practices for African election commissions. Held in Accra, the conference was titled Colloquium on African Elections: Best Practices and Cross-Sectoral Collaboration. The conference was organized by a number of international election reform organizations including the National Democratic Institute, the Africa Center for Strategic Studies, the International Foundation for Electoral Systems, the Netherlands Institute for Multiparty Democracy, the Open Society Initiative for West Africa and UNDP. Conference participants agreed to a communique that makes recommendations directed at African governments, civil society organizations, election management bodies, political parties, election monitoring and observer groups, security services, and the media to improve the credibility of elections in Africa.

== See also ==
- List of MPs elected in the 2008 Ghanaian parliamentary election
