= List of MPs elected in the 2004 Ghanaian parliamentary election =

Colonial Era
1951 Assembly	(election)
1954 Assembly	(election)
1956 Assembly	(election)
First Republic
1957 Parliament	(election)
1965 Parliament	(election)
Second Republic
1969 Parliament	(election)
Third Republic
1979 Parliament	(election)
Fourth Republic
1st Parliament	(1992)
2nd Parliament	(1996)
3rd Parliament	(2000)
4th Parliament	(2004)
5th Parliament	(2008)
6th Parliament	(2012)
7th Parliament	(2016)
8th Parliament	(2020)
9th Parliament	(2024)

This is a list of members of Parliament (MPs) elected to the Parliament of Ghana for the Fourth Parliament of the Fourth Republic of Ghana at the 2004 parliamentary election, held on 7 December 2004.

The list is arranged by region and constituency. New MPs elected since the general election and changes in party allegiance are noted at the bottom of the page. Only eight MPs survived from the First Parliament of the Fourth Republic.

== Current composition ==
Affiliation	Members
New Patriotic Party (NPP)	128
National Democratic Congress (NDC)	94
People's National Convention (PNC)	4
Convention People's Party (CPP)	3
Independent	1
Speaker and Deputies	(3)
Total	230
Government Majority	26

== List of MPs elected in the general election ==
The following table is a list of MPs elected on 7 December 2004, ordered by region and constituency. The previous MP and previous party column shows the MP and party holding the seat prior to the election.

Table of contents:

Ashanti Region • Brong Ahafo Region • Central Region • Eastern Region • Greater Accra Region Northern Region • Upper East Region • Upper West Region • Volta Region • Western Region Changes • By-elections • Notes and References • See also • External links and sources

=== Ashanti Region - 39 seats ===
Constituency	Elected MP	Elected Party	Majority	Previous MP	Previous Party
Adansi Asokwa	Kobina Tahir Hammond	NPP	6,417	Kobina Tahir Hammond	NPP
Afigya-Sekyere East	Hennric David Yeboah	NPP	23,693	Kwesi Akomia Kyeremateng	NPP
Afigya-Sekyere West	Albert Kan-Dapaah	NPP	10,337	Albert Kan-Dapaah	NPP
Ahafo Ano North	Kwame Owusu Frimpong	NPP	2,256	Kwame Owusu Frimpong	NPP
Ahafo Ano South	Stephen Kwaku Balado Manu	NPP	10,919	Stephen Kwaku Balado Manu	NPP
Akrofuom (Note: New constituency created 2004.)	Kwabena Appiah-Pinkrah	NPP	6,273	New constituency	—
Amansie West	Kofi Krah Mensah	NPP	34,946	Stephen Cobbinah B. Karikari	NPP
Asante Akim North	Kwadwo Baah-Wiredu	NPP	29,035	Kwadwo Baah-Wiredu	NPP
Asante Akim South	Gifty Ohene Konadu	NPP	11,720	Alex Kwaku Korankye	NPP
Asawase	Gibril Adamu Mohammed	NDC	4,474	New constituency	—
Asokwa (Note: Constituency changed in 2004.)	Maxwell Kofi Jumah	NPP	33,787	Constituency reconfiguration	(NPP)
Atwima / Kwanwoma	Matthew Kwaku Antwi	NPP	24,340	Matthew Kwaku Antwi	NPP
Atwima Mponua	Isaac Kwame Asiamah	NPP	16,547	Akwasi D. Afriyie	NPP
Atwima Nwabiagya	Benito Owusu Bio	NPP	44,355	James Edusei Sarkodie	NPP
Bantama	Cecilia Abena Dapaah	NPP	33,776	Richard Winfred Anane	NPP
Bekwai	Ignatius Kofi Poku Edusei	NPP	30,614	Ignatius Kofi Poku Edusei	NPP
Bosome-Freho	Nana Yaw Edward Ofori-Kuragu	NPP	12,789	Gabriel Yaw Amoah	NPP
Bosomtwe	Simon Osei Mensah	NPP	23,162	Adu Gyamfi Poku	NPP
Effiduase-Asokore	Grace Coleman	NPP	6,975	Grace Coleman	NPP
Ejisu/Juabeng	Akwasi Osei-Adjei	NPP	39,338	Akwasi Osei-Adjei	NPP
Ejura Sekyedumasi	Issifu Pangabu Mohammed	NDC	3,450	Sampson Atakora	NDC
Fomena	Akwasi Afrifa (Fomena politician)	NPP	4,111	Akwasi Afrifa	NPP
Kumawu	Yaw Baah	NPP	13,543	Reo Addai Basoah	NPP
Kwabre East	Kofi Frempong	NPP	33,188	Nana Asante Frimpong	NPP
Kwabre West	Emmanuel Asamoa Owusu-Ansah	NPP	21,654	New constituency	—
Kwadaso<	Josephine Hilda Addoh	NPP	36,756	New constituency	—
Mampong	Peter Abum Sarkodie	NPP	22,076	Solomon Kwabena Sarfoh	NPP
Manhyia	Kwame Addo-Kufuor	NPP	55,506	Kwame Addo-Kufuor	NPP
New Edubease	Ernest Kofi Yakah	NDC	1,115	Augustine A Cudjoe	NDC
Nhyiaeso	Richard Winfred Anane	NPP	27,399	New constituency	—
Nsuta/Kwamang	Kwame Osei Prempeh	NPP	7,935	Kwame Osei Prempeh	NPP
Obuasi	Edward Michael Ennin	NPP	16,463	Anthony Bright B. Mensah	NPP
Odotobri	Emmanuel Akwasi Gyamfi	NPP	20,064	Samuel Nkrumah Gyimah	NPP
Offinso North	Kofi Konadu Apraku	NPP	390	Kofi Konadu Apraku	NPP
Offinso South	Kwabena Sarfo	NPP	8,057	Kwabena Sarfo	NPP
Oforikrom	Elizabeth Agyeman	NPP	26,332	New constituency	
Old Tafo	Anthony Akoto Osei	NPP	27,841	New constituency	—
Suame	Osei Kyei Mensah Bonsu	NPP	40,052	Osei Kyei Mensah Bonsu	NPP
Subin	Sampson Kwaku Boafo	NPP	31,614	Sampson Kwaku Boafo	NPP
=== Brong Ahafo Region - 24 seats ===
Constituency	Elected MP	Elected Party	Majority	Previous MP	Previous Party
Asunafo North	Robert Sarfo-Mensah	NPP	4,138	Benjamin Osei Kuffour	NPP
Asunafo South	Eric Opoku	NDC	1,216	George William Amponsah	NPP
Asutifi North	Paul Okoh	NPP	1,436	Paul Okoh	NPP
Asutifi South	Collins Dauda	NDC	905	Cecilia Djan Amoah	NPP
Atebubu-Amantin	Emmanuel Owusu Manu	NDC	3,176	New constituency	—
Berekum	Nkrabeah Effah Dartey	NPP	9,487	Nkrabeah Effah Dartey	NPP
Dormaa East	Yaw Ntow Ababio	NPP	3,994	Stephen Adoma-Yeboah	NPP
Dormaa West	Yaw Asiedu-Mensah	NPP	1,163	Yaw Asiedu-Mensah	NPP
Jaman North	Alexander Asum-Ahensah	NDC	1,603	New constituency	—
Jaman South (formerly Jaman)	Anna Nyamekye	NPP	15,757	Anna Nyamekye	NPP
Kintampo North	Stephen Kunsu	NDC	8,789	New constituency	—
Kintampo South (formerly Kintampo)	Yaw Effah-Baafi	NDC	4,565	Yaw Effah-Baafi	NDC
Nkoranza North	Eric Amoateng	NPP	3,742	New constituency	—
Nkoranza South	Kwame Ampofo Twumasi	NPP	2,134	Hayford Francis Amoako	NDC
Pru	Masoud Baba Abdul-Rahman	NDC	10,051	New constituency	—
Sene	Felix Twumasi-Appiah	NDC	12,135	Felix Twumasi-Appiah	NDC
Sunyani East	Joseph Henry Mensah	NPP	14,175	Joseph Henry Mensah	NPP
Sunyani West	Kwadwo Adjei Darko	NPP	7,514	Kwadwo Adjei Darko	NPP
Tain	Joe Danquah	NPP	918	New constituency	—
Tano North	Ernest Akobuor Debrah	NPP	5,615	Joe Donkor	NPP
Tano South	Andrews Adjei-Yeboah	NPP	14,741	Andrews Adjei-Yeboah	NPP
Techiman North	Alex Kyeremeh	NDC	1,430	Isaac Kwadwo Adjei Mensah	NDC
Techiman South	Simons Addai	NDC	3,387	Prince Oduro-Mensah	NPP
Wenchi	Prof. George Yaw Djan-Baffuor	NPP	10,514	New constituency	—
=== Central Region - 19 seats ===
Constituency	Elected MP	Elected Party	Majority	Previous MP	Previous Party
Abura/Asebu/Kwamankese	Andrew Kingsford Mensah	NPP	3,819	Harry Halifax-Hayford	NDC
Agona East	John Agyabeng	NPP	10,603	Kwaku Adu Yeboah	NDC
Agona West	Samuel Kweku Obodai	NPP	5,408	Samuel Kweku Obodai	NPP
Ajumako/Enyan/Essiam	Isaac Eduasar Edumadze	NPP	7,060	Isaac Eduasar Edumadze	NPP
Asikuma/Odoben/Brakwa	Paul Collins Appiah-Ofori	NPP	6,806	Paul Collins Appiah-Ofori	NPP
Assin North	Ken Ohene Agyapong	NPP	10,289	Ken Ohene Agyapong	NPP
Assin South	Dominic Kwaku Fobih	NPP	9,777	Dominic Kwaku Fobih	NPP
Awutu /Senya	Oppey Abbey	NPP	13,742	Hanna Tetteh K. Kpodar	NDC
Cape Coast	Christine Churcher	NPP	4,726	Christine Churcher	NPP
Effutu	Samuel Owusu Agyei	NPP	1,214	Mike Allen Hammah	NDC
Gomoa East	Richard Sam Quarm	NPP	5,180	Emmanuel Acheampong	NPP
Gomoa West	Joe Kingsley Hackman	NPP	11,498	Ama Benyiwa-Doe	NDC
Hemang-Lower-Denkyira	Benjamin Bimpong Donkor	NPP	4,763	New constituency	—
Komenda-Edina-Eguafo-Abbrem	Paa Kwesi Nduom	CPP	15,554	Ato Quarshie	NDC
Mfantsiman East	George Kuntu Blankson	NDC	1,612	Comfort Owusu	NDC
Mfantsiman West	Stephen Asamoah Boateng	NPP	7,529	Jacob Scherrer Arthur	NDC
Twifo-Atti Morkwaa	Elizabeth Amoah Tetteh	NDC	2,725	New constituency	—
Upper Denkyira East	Nana Amoakoh	NPP	15,007	New constituency	—
Upper Denkyira West	Benjamin Kofi Ayeh	NPP	6,732	New constituency	—
=== Eastern Region - 28 seats ===
Constituency	Elected MP	Elected Party	Majority	Previous MP	Previous Party
Abetifi	Eugene Atta Agyepong	NPP	9,446	Eugene Atta Agyepong	NPP
Abirem (Note: Birim North constituency in the Birim North District has been replaced by the Abirem constituency.) (formerly Birim North)	Esther Obeng Dapaah	NPP	6,065	William Boakye Akoto	NPP
Aburi-Nsawam	Magnus Opare-Asamoah	NPP	6,550	New constituency	—
Afram Plains North	Joseph Tsatsu Agbenu	NDC	13,822	Joseph Tsatsu Agbenu	NDC
Afram Plains South	Raphael Kofi Ahaligah	NDC	4,839	Kwakye Addo	NDC
Akim Abuakwa North (Note: There was a single Abuakwa constituency that was split into Akim Abuakwa North and Akim Abuakwa South.)	Joseph Boakye Danquah Adu	NPP	8,431	New constituency	—
Akim Abuakwa South	Nana Addo Dankwa Akufo-Addo	NPP	12,531	Nana Addo Dankwa Akufo-Addo	NPP
Akim Oda	Yaw Osafo-Maafo	NPP	23,461	Yaw Osafo-Maafo	NPP
Akim Swedru	Felix Owusu Adjapong (Majority Leader)	NPP	11,381	Felix Owusu Adjapong	NPP
Akropong	William Ofori Boafo	NPP	11,778	Agyare Koi Larbi	NPP
Akwatia	Kiston Akomena Kissi	NPP	1,902	Kiston Akomena Kissi	NPP
Asuogyaman	Kofi Osei-Ameyaw	NPP	1,933	Emmanuel Dwamena Bekoe	NDC
Atiwa	Yaw Brempong-Yeboah	NPP	18,155	Yaw Brempong-Yeboah	NPP
Ayensuano	Godfred Kwame Otchere	NPP	4,953	Godfred Kwame Otchere	NPP
Fanteakwa	Kwadjo Agyei Addo	NPP		Samuel Ofosu Ampofo	NDC
Kade	Ofosu Asamoah	NPP		Ofosu Asamoah	NPP
Lower Manya Krobo	Michael Teye Nyaunu	NDC		Michael Teye Nyaunu	NDC
Lower West Akim	James Appietu-Ankrah	NPP		Peter Kwaw	NPP
Mpraeso	Francis Osafo-Mensah	NPP		Francis Osafo-Mensah	NPP
New Juabeng North	Hackman Owusu-Agyeman	NPP		Hackman Owusu-Agyeman	NPP
New Juaben South formerly Koforidua	Yaw Barimah	NPP		Yaw Barimah	NPP
Nkawkaw	Kwabena Adusa Okerchiri	NPP		Kwabena Adusa Okerchiri	NPP
Ofoase-Ayirebi	David Oppon-Kusi	NPP		New constituency	—
Okere	Brandford Kwame Daniel Adu	NPP		Brandford Kwame Daniel Adu	NPP
Suhum	Frederick Opare-Ansah	NPP		Ransford Agyapong	NPP
Upper Manya Krobo	Stephen Amoanor Kwao	NDC		Stephen Amoanor Kwao	NDC
Upper West Akim	Samuel Sallas Mensah	NDC		Samuel Sallas Mensah	NDC
Yilo Krobo	Raymond Tawiah	NDC		Daniel Tekpertey	NDC
=== Greater Accra Region - 27 seats ===
Constituency	Elected MP	Elected Party	Majority	Previous MP	Previous Party
Ablekuma Central	Victor Okuley Nortey	NPP		Victor Okuley Nortey	NPP
Ablekuma North	Kwamena Bartels	NPP		Kwamena Bartels	NPP
Ablekuma South	Theresa Ameley Tagoe	NPP		Fritz Baffour	NDC
Abokobi-Madina	Amadu Bukari Sorogho	NDC		New constituency	—
Ada	Alex Narh Tettey-Enyo	NDC		Amos Lawerh Buertey	NDC
Adenta	Kwadjo Opare-Hammond	NPP		New constituency	
Ashaiman	Kwame Alfred Agbesi	NDC		Emmanuel Kinsford Kwesi Teye	NPP
Ayawaso Central	Sheikh Ibrahim Cudjoe Quaye	NPP		Sheikh Ibrahim Cudjoe Quaye	NPP
Ayawaso East	Mustapha Ahmed	NDC		Mustapha Ahmed	NDC
Ayawaso West-Wuogon	Akosua Frema Osei-Opare	NPP		George Isaac Amoo	NPP
Dade-Kotopon	Nii Amasah Namoale	NDC		Godfried Ako-Nai	NPP
Dome Kwabenya	Aaron Michael Oquaye	NPP		New constituency	—
Domeabra-Obom	Daoud Anum Yemoh	NPP		New constituency	—
Klottey-Korle	Nii Adu Daku Mante	NPP		Nii Adu Daku Mante	NPP
Kpone-Katamanso	Joseph Nii Laryea Afotey Agbo	NDC		Afieye Ashong	NDC
Krowor	Abraham Laryea Odai	NPP		Emmanuel Adjei Boye	NPP
Ledzokuku	Gladys Nortey Ashitey	NPP		Eddie Akita	NPP
Ningo-Prampram	Enoch Teye Mensah	NDC		Enoch Teye Mensah	NDC
Odododiodoo	Samuel Nii Ayi Mankattah (Note: Samuel Nii Ayi Mankattah died during his term in parliament and was replaced in a bye election on 30 August 2005.)	NDC		Reginald Niibi Ayi-Bonte	NPP
Okaikwei North	Elizabeth K. Tawiah Sackey	NPP		Joseph Darko Mensah	NPP
Okaikwei South	Nana Akomea	NPP		Nana Akomea	NPP
Sege	Alfred W. Gbordzor Abayateye	NDC		New constituency	—
Shai-Osudoku	David Tetteh Assumeng	NDC		Michael Afedi Gizo	NDC
Tema East	Ishmael Ashitey	NDC		Ishmael Ashitey	NDC
Tema West	Abraham Ossei Aidooh	NPP		Abraham Osei-Aidooh	NPP
Trobu-Amasaman	Samuel Nee-Aryeetey Attoh	NPP		New constituency	—
Weija	Shirley Ayorkor Botchwey	NPP		New constituency	—
=== Northern Region - 26 seats ===
Constituency	Elected MP	Elected Party	Majority	Previous MP	Previous Party
Bimbilla	Mohamed Ibn Chambas	NDC		Dominc Aduna Bingab Nitiwul	NPP
Bole	John Dramani Mahama	NDC		John Dramani Mahama	NDC
Bunkpurugu/Yunyoo	Joseph Yaani Labik	Independent		Namburr Berrick	NDC
Chereponi	Doris A. Seidu	NPP		Mohammed Seidu Abah	NDC
Damango-Daboya	Alex Seidu Sofo	NPP		Alex Seidu Sofo	NPP
Gushiegu	Rita Tani Iddi	NPP		Iddrisu Huudu	NDC
Karaga	Iddrisu Dawuda	NDC		New constituency	—
Kpandai	Lipkalimor Kwajo Tawiah	NDC		Lipkalimor Kwajo Tawiah	NDC
Kumbungu	Yakubu K. Imoro	NDC		Muhammed Mumuni	NDC
Mion	Ahmed Alhassan Yakubu	NDC		Adams Ebenezer Mahama	NDC
Nalerigu	Alima Mahama	NPP		Tia Alfred Sugri	NDC
Nanton	Alhassan Yakubu	NDC		Alhassan Yakubu	NDC
Saboba	Charles Binipom Bintin	NPP		Nayon Bilijo	NDC
Salaga	Boniface Abubakar Saddique	NPP		Boniface Abubakar Saddique	Independent
Savelugu	Mary Salifu Boforo	NDC		Mary Salifu Boforo	NDC
Sawla-Tuna-Kalba	Donald Dari Saditey	NDC		Joseph Trumah Bayel	NDC
Tamale Central	Alhassan Wayo Seini	NDC		New constituency	—
Tamale North	Abubakari Sumani	NDC		New constituency	—
Tamale South	Iddrisu Haruna	NDC		New constituency	—
Tolon	Umar Abdul-Razak	NDC		Abdulai Salifu	NDC
Walewale (East) (formerly West Mamprusi)	Alidu Iddrisu Zakari	NDC		Issifu Asumah	(PNC)
Wulensi	Kofi Karim Wumbei	NPP		Kofi Karim Wumbei	NPP
Yagaba-Kubori (Walewale West)	Abdul-Rauf Tanko Ibrahim	NDC		New constituency	—
Yapei-Kusawgu	Seidu Amadu	NDC		Seidu Amadu	NDC
Yendi	Malik Al-Hassan Yakubu (Second Deputy Speaker)	NPP		Malik Al-Hassan Yakubu	NPP
Zabzugu/Tatale	Mohammed Jagri	NDC		Mohammed Jagri	NDC
=== Upper East Region - 13 seats ===
Constituency	Elected MP	Elected Party	Majority	Previous MP	Previous Party
Bawku Central	Mahama Ayariga	NDC		Hawa Yakubu	NPP
Binduri	Mark Anthony Awuni	NDC		Achidago B. Akugri	NDC
Bolgatanga	David Apasara	PNC		David Apasara	PNC
Bongo	Albert Abongo	NDC		Albert Abongo	NDC
Builsa North	Agnes A. Chigabatia	NPP		Anuka Theodore Basil	NDC
Builsa South	Abolimbisa Roger Akantagriwen	NDC		Norbet Awulley	NDC
Chiana-Paga	Pele Tumbakura Abugu	NDC		Pele Tumbakura Abugu	NDC
Garu - Tempane	Dominic Azumah	NDC		Joseph Akudibilla	Independent
Nabdam	Moses Asaga	NDC		Moses Asaga	NDC
Navrongo Central	Joseph Kofi Adda	NPP		Joseph Kofi Adda	NPP
Pusiga	Simon Atingban Akunye	NDC		New constituency	—
Talensi	John Akologu Tia	NDC		John Akologu Tia	NDC
Zebilla (formerly Bawku West)	John Akparibo Ndebugre	PNC		Cletus Apul Avoka	NDC
=== Upper West Region - 10 seats ===
Constituency	Elected MP	Elected Party	Majority	Previous MP	Previous Party
Jirapa	Edward Kojo Salia	NDC		Edward Kojo Salia	NDC
Lambussie	Alice Teni Boon	NDC		Alice Teni Boon	NDC
Lawra-Nandom	Benjamin Bewa-Nyog Kunbuor	NDC		Benjamin Bewa-Nyog Kunbuor	NDC
Nadowli East (Note: Nadowli South constituency was renamed as Nadowli East; and Nadwoli North constituency was renamed into Nadowli West.)	Mathias Asoma Puozaa	NDC		Emmanuel Samba Zumakpeh	NDC
Nadowli West (Note: Nadowli North constituency was split into Nadowli East and Nadowli West, with the member of parliament for Nadowli North standing in Nadowli West.)	Alban Bagbin (Minority Leader)	NDC		Alban Bagbin	NDC
Sissala East (Note: Sissala split into Sissala East and Sissala West.) formerly Sissala	Moses Dani Baah	PNC		Moses Dani Baah	PNC
Sissala West	Haruna Bayirga	PNC		New constituency	—
Wa Central	Abdul-Rashid Hassan Pelpuo	NDC		Seidu Mummuni Abudu	NDC
Wa East	Bayon Godfrey Tangu	NPP		Alhaji Issahaku Salia	NDC
Wa West	Joseph Yieleh Chireh	NDC		New constituency	—
=== Volta Region - 22 seats ===
Constituency	Elected MP	Elected Party	Majority	Previous MP	Previous Party
Akan	John Kwadjo Gyampong	NDC	3,873	Bawa Rashid	Independent
Anlo	Clement Kofi Humado	NDC	3,669	James Victor Gbeho	Independent
Avenor-Ave	Edward Korbly Doe Adjaho	NDC	7,814	Edward Korbly Doe Adjaho	NDC
Biakoye	Emmanuel Kwasi Bandua	NDC	7,675	Kwabena Adjei	NDC
Buem	Henry Ford Kamel	NDC	10,488	Emil Kwadzo Brantuo	NDC
Central Tongu	Joe Kwashie Gidisu	NDC		New constituency	—
Ho Central	George Kofi Nfodjoh	NDC	44,803	Kofi Attor	NDC
Ho East	Juliana Azumah-Mensah	NDC	536	Steve Senu Akorli	NDC
Ho West	Francis Aggrey Agbotse	NDC	20,679	Francis Aggrey Agbotse	NDC
Hohoe North	Prince Jacob Hayibor	NDC	27,339	Nathaniel Kwadzo Aduadjoe	NDC
Hohoe South	Joseph Zaphenat Amenowode	NDC	17,720	Kosi Kedem	NDC
Keta	Dan Kwasi Abodakpi	NDC	24,827	Dan Kwasi Abodakpi	NDC
Ketu North	James Klutse Avedzi	NDC	18,034	Modestus Y.Z. Ahiable	NDC
Ketu South	Albert Kwasi Zigah	NDC	32,036	Charles Kofi Agbenaza	NDC
Krachi East	Wisdom Gidisu	NDC		New constituency	—
Krachi West	Francis Y. Osei Sarfo	NDC	6,826	Francis Y. Osei Sarfo	(NDC)
Nkwanta North	Joseph K. Nayan	NPP		New constituency	—
Nkwanta South	Gershon Kofi Gbediame	NDC	6,964	Gershon Kofi Gbediame	(NDC)
North Dayi	Akua Sena Dansua	NDC	25,754	Akua Sena Dansua	NDC
North Tongu	Charles Hodogbey	NDC	15,392	Joe Gidisu	NDC
South Dayi	Daniel Kwame Ampofo	NDC	10,944	Daniel Kwame Ampofo	NDC
South Tongu	Kenneth Dzirasah	NDC	23,730	Kenneth Dzirasah (Second Deputy Speaker)	NDC
=== Western Region - 22 seats ===
Constituency	Elected MP	Elected Party	Majority	Previous MP	Previous Party
Ahanta West	Samuel Johnfiah	NPP		Samuel Johnfiah	NPP
Amenfi Central	George Kofi Arthur	NDC		John Frank Abu	NDC
Amenfi East	Joseph Boahen Aidoo	NPP		Joseph Boahen Aidoo	NPP
Amenfi West	John Gyetuah	NDC		Mrs Agnes Sonful	NPP
Aowin	Samuel Adu Gyamfi	NPP		New constituency	—
Bia	Michael Coffie Boampong	NDC		Michael Coffie Boampong	NDC
Bibiani-Anhwiaso-Bekwai	Christopher Addae	NPP		Seidu Paakuna Adamu	NDC
Effia-Kwesimintsim	Joe Baidoo-Ansah	NPP		Joe Baidoo-Ansah	NPP
Ellembele	Frederick Worsemao Armah Blay (First Deputy Speaker)	CPP		Frederick Worsemao Armah Blay (First Deputy Speaker)	CPP
Essikado-Ketan	Joe Ghartey	NPP		New constituency	—
Evalue Gwira	Kojo Armah	CPP		Edith Hazel	NDC
Jomoro	Lee Ocran	NDC		Joseph Emmanuel Ackah	NDC
Juabeso	Sampson Ahi	NDC		Anthony K Gyapong-Mensah	NDC
Mpohor-Wassa East	Anthony Evans Amoah	NPP		Samuel Kwame Amponsah	NDC
Prestea-Huni Valley	Albert Kwaku Obbin	NPP		Albert Kwaku Obbin	NPP
Sefwi Akontombra	Herod Cobbina	NDC		New constituency	—
Sefwi-Wiawso	Paul Evans Aidoo	NDC		Isaac Kobina Nyame-Ofori	NDC
Sekondi	Papa Owusu-Ankomah	NPP		Papa Owusu-Ankomah	NPP
Shama	Angelina Baiden-Amissah	NPP		Angelina Baiden-Amissah	NPP
Suaman	Stephen Michael Essuah Kofi Ackah	NDC		John Kwekuchur Ackah	NDC
Takoradi	Gladys Asmah	NPP		Gladys Asmah	NPP
Tarkwa-Nsuaem	Gifty Eugenia Kusi	NPP		Gifty Eugenia Kusi	NPP

== Changes ==
- Alhassan Wayo Seini, MP for Tamale Central, left the NDC to join the NPP. He also resigned his seat in parliament.
- Dan Abodakpi, MP for Keta constituency, who was also Minister for Trade and Industry in the NDC Rawlings government, was jailed by a Fast Track Court in Ghana for fraud.
- Kwadwo Baah Wiredu, NPP MP for Asante Akim North constituency died in Pretoria, South Africa on 24 September 2008.

== By-elections ==
- Asawase constituency - 21 April 2005 - Alhaji Muntanka Mohammed Mubarak (NDC) won with a majority of 11,142 replacing the late Dr Gibrine also of the NDC who had won the seat in December 2004 with a majority of 4,474. The Ghana Center for Democratic Development deemed that this by-election was "fair and transparent, but not free from fear."
- Odododiodoo constituency - 30 August 2005 - Jonathan Nii Tackie Komey (NDC) won with a majority of 8377 to replace Samuel Nii Ayi Mankattah also of the NDC who had died earlier.
- Tamale Central constituency - 4 April 2006 - Alhassan Fuseini Inusah (NDC) won with a majority of 17502. This followed the resignation of Alhassan Wayo Seini (NDC), who resigned to join the (NPP) but lost the resultant by-election.
- Offinso South constituency - 24 October 2006 - Owusu Achaw Duah (NPP) won with a majority of 10097. He replaced Kwabena Sarfo also of the NPP.
- Fomena constituency - 23 January 2007 - Nana Abu Bonsra (NPP) won with a majority of 7522. This followed the death of Akwasi Afrifa (NPP).
- Nkoranza North constituency - 13 March 2007 - Major (rtd) Derek Oduro (NPP) won with a majority of 43631, after Eric Amoateng had vacated the seat while standing trial in the United States for drug trafficking.

== See also ==
- 2004 Ghanaian parliamentary election
- Parliament of Ghana
- Ebenezer Sekyi-Hughes - Speaker of the Fourth Parliament
