= Anthony Boakye-Yiadom =

Ghanaian politician

Member of Parliament for Amansie West Constituency
- In office 7 January 1996 – 6 January 2001
- President: Jerry John Rawlings
- Preceded by: Kofi Amankwaa Peasah
- Succeeded by: Stephen Cobbinah B. Karikari

Personal details
- Party: New Patriotic Party

Anthony Boakye-Yiadom is a Ghanaian politician. He is a member of parliament that represented Amansie West constituency in the Ashanti Region of Ghana in the 2nd Parliament of the 4th Republic of Ghana with the ticket of the New Patriotic Party.

== Politics ==
Anthony Boakye-Yiadom's political career began after he contested for the office of the member of the parliament to represent Amannsie West Constituency in the 1996 Ghanaian general election on the ticket of the New Patriotic Party. He took the seat from Mr. Kofi Amankwaa Peasah of National Democratic Congress after obtaining 24,874 votes to beat Mr Kwaku Aninkora Sie of the National Democratic Congress who had 11,789 votes, Mr. E.K.Berko of the People's National Convention who had 1,174 votes and Mr. John Nimoh of the National Convention Party who had 1,160 votes. He was succeeded in office by Stephen Cobbinah Buor-Karikari of the New Patriotic Party who won the 2000 Ghanaian general election.

== Personal life ==
Anthony Boakye-Yiadom is a Christian and a Church elder at the Church of Pentecost.
