= Amin Amidu Sulemana =

Ghanaian diplomat and politician (born 1955)

Ing Amin Amidu Sulemana Hon.

ECOWAS Commissioner for Infrastructure, Energy and Digitalization

Member of the Ghanaian Parliament for Sissala West
- In office 7 January 2013 – 6 January 2017
- President: John Dramani Mahama
- Preceded by: Haruna Bayirga
- Succeeded by: Patrick Al-Hassan Adamah
- Majority: 3,150
- Incumbent
- Assumed office 1 September 2026
- In office 30 January 2013 – 16 July 2014
- President: John Dramani Mahama
- Preceded by: Joe Gidisu
- Succeeded by: Inusah Fuseini

Ghana Ambassador to Egypt
- In office 13 July 2009 – 25 January 2012
- President: John Atta Mills
- Succeeded by: Said Sinare

Member of the Ghanaian Parliament for Sissala
- In office 7 January 1993 – 6 January 2001
- President: Jerry John Rawlings
- Preceded by: New
- Succeeded by: Moses Dani Baah

Personal details
- Born: 20 October 1957 (age 69) Jawia
- Party: National Democratic Congress
- Spouse: Jalia Yakubu
- Children: 8
- Occupation: Mechanical Engineer, Diplomat, Politician
- Website: https://www.ecowas.int/people/hon-amin-amidu-sulemani/

Hon. Ing. Amin Amidu Sulemana is a Ghanaian diplomat and politician. He was the Member of Parliament for the Sissala West constituency in Ghana. He was also the Minister for Roads and Highways in Ghana.

Ing. Aminu Amidu Sulemana was the Ghanaian ambassador to Egypt until he was appointed Upper West Regional Minister by President Mills in January 2012 following a cabinet reshuffle. He won the Sissala West constituency seat on the ticket of the National Democratic Congress in the December 2012 election and took his seat in the Parliament of Ghana on 7 January 2013. He was appointed Minister for Roads and Highways by President Mahama in January 2013.

== Early life ==
Amidu was born on 20 October 1957 in Gyawia in the Upper West Region of Ghana. He attended Nandom Senior High School (formerly Nandom Secondary School) in his region where he sat for his General Certificate Examination (GCE). He proceeded to further his studies at Kwame Nkrumah University of Science and Technology, Kumasi to pursue his Bachelor of Science degree in mechanical engineering. He worked as an engineer before going into politics in 1992.

== Political career ==
He was elected into the first parliament of the fourth republic of Ghana on 7 January 1993 after he was pronounced winner at the 1992 Ghanaian parliamentary election held on 29 December 1992.

Amidu was re-elected into the second parliament of the fourth republic on 7 January 1997 after he was declared winner at the 1996 Ghanaian General Election having defeated Moses Dani Baah of the People's National Convention and Solomon Salia Nmangu of the New Patriotic Party. He obtained 44.00% of the total valid votes which is equivalent to 16,688 votes while his oppositions claimed 33.20% which is equivalent to 12,589 votes and 3.00% which is equivalent to 1,150 votes respectively. His tenure ended on 6 January 2001.

=== 2012 election ===
After years of serving as the ambassador to Egypt, Amidu decided to go back into parliament and became the standard bearer for the National Democratic Congress once again to represent his newly formed constituency Sissala West constituency. He defeated Patrick Al-hassan Adamahof the New Patriotic Party, Bayirga Haruna of the People's National Convention and Abu Fatawu of the New Democratic Party. He obtained 50.29% of the total valid votes which is equivalent to 11,294 votes while his opponents claimed 36.26% which is equivalent to 8,144 votes, 13.10% which is equivalent to 2,943 votes and 0.34% which is equivalent to 77 votes respectively.

=== ECOWAS Commissioner 2026 ===
September 2026, Ing. Amin Amidu Sulemani was appointed as ECOWAS Commissioner for Infrastructure, Energy and Digitalization. Hon. Sulemani's leadership is expected to accelerate the implementation of ECOWAS's 25-year Regional Infrastructure Development Plan, which aims to facilitate integrated infrastructure projects across member states.

== See also ==
- Sissala West
- List of Mills government ministers
- National Democratic Congress

Parliament of Ghana
Preceded by Haruna Bayirga	MP for Sissala West; 2013 — present	Incumbent
Political offices
Preceded by Issaku Saliah	Upper West Regional Minister; 2012	Succeeded by Bede Anwataazumo Ziedeng
Preceded by Joe Gidisu	Minister for Road and Highways; 2013 — present	Succeeded by incumbent
Diplomatic posts
Preceded by ?	Ambassador to Egypt ? – 2012	Succeeded by Siad Sinare
