= Emmanuel Asamoah Owusu-Ansah =

Ghanaian politician

Hon. Emmanuel Asamoah Owusu-Ansah

Member of Parliament for Kwabre West
- In office 7 January 2005 – 6 January 2013
- Preceded by: Constituency split
- Succeeded by: constituency abolished

Personal details
- Born: 17 July 1939
- Died: 22 June 2012 (aged 72)
- Party: New Patriotic Party
- Children: 5
- Education: University of Ghana
- Profession: Lawyer

Emmanuel Asamoah Owusu-Ansah (17 July 1939 – 22 June 2012) was a lawyer and Ghanaian politician of the Republic of Ghana. He was the Member of Parliament representing the Kwabre West constituency of the Ashanti Region of Ghana in the 4th and 5th Parliament of the 4th Republic of Ghana. He was a member of the New Patriotic Party.

== Early life and education ==
Owusu-Ansah was born on 17 July 1939. He hailed from Bomso near Kodie a town in the Ashanti Region of Ghana. He was a product of the University of Ghana (UG). He held a Bachelor of Science degree in economics from the university. He acquired the degree in 1967. He was also a product of The Hague in the Netherlands. From there, he acquired a master's degree in Public Administration. This was in 1974. He was also a graduate of the Ghana School of Law. He acquired a Bachelor of Law degree from the school in 1986.

== Career ==
Owusu-Ansah was a lawyer by profession. He was the judicial secretary at the Judicial Service.

== Political career ==
Owusu-Ansah was a member of the New Patriotic Party. He became a member of parliament in January 2005 after emerging winner in the General Election in December 2004. He run for a second term in office. He was the MP for the Kwabre West constituency. He was elected as the member of parliament for this constituency in the fourth and fifth parliaments of the fourth Republic of Ghana.

== Elections ==
Owusu-Ansah was elected as the member of parliament for the Kwabre West constituency of the Ashanti Region of Ghana for the first time in the 2004 Ghanaian general elections. He won on the ticket of the New Patriotic Party. His constituency was a part of the 36 parliamentary seats out of 39 seats won by the New Patriotic Party in that election for the Ashanti Region. The New Patriotic Party won a majority total of 128 parliamentary seats out of 230 seats. He was elected with 26,700 votes out of 31,746 total valid votes cast. This was equivalent to 84.1% of the total valid votes cast. He was elected over Gabriel Amakye of the National Democratic Congress.6 Amakye obtained 5,046 votes of the total valid votes cast. This was equivalent to 15.9% of the total valid votes cast.

In 2008, he won the general elections on the ticket of the New Patriotic Party for the same constituency. His constituency was part of the 34 parliamentary seats out of 39 seats won by the New Patriotic Party in that election for the Ashanti Region. The New Patriotic Party won a minority total of 109 parliamentary seats out of 230 seats. He was elected with 27,460 votes out of 33,516 total valid votes cast. This was equivalent to 81.93% of the total valid votes cast. He was elected over Joseph Boache Danquah of the People's National Convention, Pius Opoku Boateng of the National Democratic Congress, Osei Kwadwo of the Reformed Patriotic Democrats and Akua Donkor an independent candidate. These obtained 3,329, 0, 729, 1998 votes respectively of the total valid cast. These were equivalent to 9.93%, 0%, 2.18% and 5.96% respectively of the total votes cast.

== Personal life ==
Owusu-Ansah was a Christian and fellowshipped as a Presbyterian. He was married with five children.

== Death ==
Owusu-Ansah died at the Korle-Bu Teaching Hospital after he collapsed on 22 June 2012.

== See also ==
- List of MPs elected in the 2004 Ghanaian parliamentary election
- List of MPs elected in the 2008 Ghanaian parliamentary election
