= Mfantseman East (Ghana parliament constituency) =

Ghana parliament constituency

Mfantsiman East
- constituency for the Parliament of Ghana
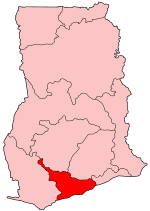
- District: Mfantsiman Municipal District
- Region: Central Region of Ghana

Current constituency
- Created: 1992 Defunct 2012
- Party: National Democratic Congress (NDC).
- MP: George Kuntu Blankson

George Kuntu Blankson is the member of parliament for the constituency. He was elected on the ticket of the National Democratic Congress (NDC) and won a majority of 1,734 votes to become the MP. He had represented the constituency in the 4th Republic parliament.

== Members of Parliament ==
First elected	Member	Party
Created 1992
1992	Comfort Owusu	National Convention Party
1996	Comfort Owusu	National Democratic Congress
2004	George Kuntu Blankson	National Democratic Congress
Defunct 2012

== See also ==
- List of Ghana Parliament constituencies
