= Kwame Darko =

Kwame Darko may refer to:

- Kwame Obeng Darko, Ghanaian footballer
- Kwame Darko (politician), Ghanaian politician and economist

== See also ==
- Kwame Awuah-Darko, Ghanaian politician, entrepreneur and banker
