= Achidago B. Akugri =

Ghanaian politician

Hon. Achidago B. Akugri

Member of Parliament for Binduri Constituency
- In office 7 January 2001 – 6 January 2005
- President: John Kufuor
- Preceded by: Fortunate Atubiga
- Succeeded by: Mark Anthony Awuni

Personal details
- Party: National Democratic Congress

Achidago B. Akugri is a Ghanaian politician and a member of the 3rd parliament of the 4th republic of Ghana. He is a former member of Parliament for the Binduri constituency in the Upper East Region and a member of the National Democratic Congress political party in Ghana.

== Politics ==
Akugri was a member of the 3rd parliament of the 4th republic of Ghana. He is a member of the National Democratic Congress. He represented the political party at the Binduri constituency of the Upper East Region of Ghana.

His political career began when he contested in the 2000 Ghanaian General elections and won on the ticket of the National Democratic Congress.

=== 2000 Elections ===
Akugri was elected as the member of parliament for the Binduri constituency in the 2000 Ghanaian general elections. He won the elections on the ticket of the National Democratic Congress. His constituency was a part of the 8 parliamentary seats out of 12 seats won by the National Democratic Congress in that election for the Western Region.

The National Democratic Congress won a minority total of 92 parliamentary seats out of 200 seats in the 3rd parliament of the 4th republic of Ghana. He was elected with 12,174 votes out of 19,927 total valid votes cast. This was equivalent to 64% of the total valid votes cast.

He was elected over Atubiga Mathias of the People's National Convention, James A. Anaba of the New Patriotic Party, and Benjamin A. Asatanga of the National Reformed Party. These obtained 3,562, 2,937 and 349 votes respectively out of the total valid votes cast. These were equivalent to 18.7%, 15.4% and 1.8% respectively of total valid votes cast.

== See also ==
- List of MPs elected in the 2000 Ghanaian parliamentary election
