= Haruna Bayirga =

Ghanaian politician

Hon. Haruna Bayirga

Member of Parliament for Sisala West Constituency
- In office 7 January 2009 – 6 January 2013
- President: John Atta Mills; John Mahama
- Succeeded by: Amin Amidu Sulemana

Member of Parliament for Sissala West Constituency
- In office 7 January 2005 – 6 January 2009
- President: John Kufuor

Personal details
- Born: 3 March 1956 (age 70)
- Party: People's National Convention
- Children: 5
- Education: Accra Polytechnic
- Profession: Architect, politician

Haruna Bayirga (born 18 August 1952) is a Ghanaian politician and a building technology engineer. He is also a former member of parliament for the Sissala West constituency of the Upper West Region of Ghana. Bayirga is the managing director of Buwah Limited.

He became the member of parliament for the Sissala West constituency in 2005 after contesting as an independent Candidate.

== Early life and education ==
Bayirga was born on 18 August at Zini in the upper west region of Ghana. He studied building technology at Accra Polytechnic in 1977 and then proceeded to Italy to obtain a diploma certificate in building technology.

== Career ==
In addition to being a politician, Bayirga is an architect by profession.

== Politics ==
His political life begun in 2004 where he contested as an independent candidate for the Sissala west constituency. He won with a total of 4,788 votes making a percentage of 30.60% of the total votes cast. In 2008, he contested again for the same seat as a member of the people's national convention party and won with a total of 5,950 votes. He contested again for the third time in 2012 during the party's delegate congress and was declared unopposed but he lost to Amin Amidu Suleman of the national democratic congress.

=== 2004 Elections ===
Bayirga was elected as the member of parliament for the Sissala West constituency in the 2004 Ghanaian general elections. He therefore represented the constituency in the 4th parliament of the 4th republic of Ghana. He was elected with 4,788votes out of 15,643 total valid votes cast. This was equivalent to 30.6% of the total valid votes cast. He was elected over Benson George Hikah of the New Patriotic Party, Amidu Sukemani of the National Democratic Congress and Kale Monetuo Peters an independent candidate. These obtained 4,419votes,4759 votes and 1,677votes respectively of the total valid votes cast. These were equivalent to 28.2%, 30.4% and 10.7% of the total valid votes cast. Bayirga was elected on the ticket of the People's National Convention. His constituency was a part of the only two constituencies won by the People's National Convention in the Upper West Region in the 2004 Ghanaian general elections. The People's National Convention won a total of 4 parliamentary representation out of a total 230 seats in the 4th parliament of the 4th republic of Ghana.

== Personal life ==
Bayirga is a Muslim and married with five children.
