= Albert Tetteh Nyakotey =

Ghanaian politician

Hon. Albert Tetteh Nyakotey
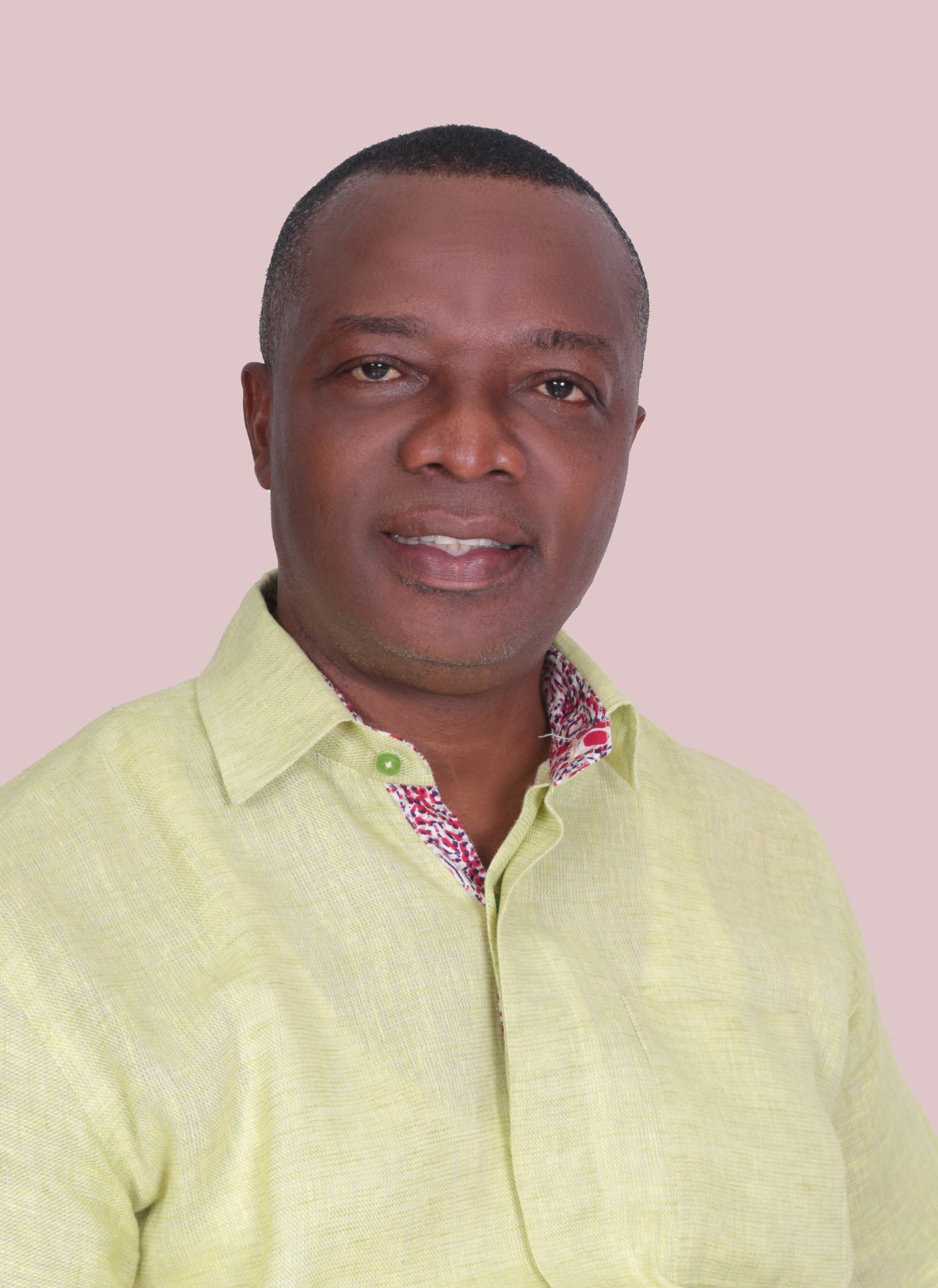

Member of Parliament for Yilo Krobo Constituency
- Incumbent
- Assumed office 7 January 2021
- Preceded by: Kofi Amoatey

Personal details
- Born: Albert Tetteh Nyakotey; 10 August 1965 (age 60) Somanya, Ghana
- Party: National Democratic Congress (Ghana)
- Occupation: Politician
- Committees: Poverty Reduction Strategy Committee, Foreign Affairs Committee

Albert Tetteh Nyakotey (born 10 August 1965) is a Ghanaian politician who is a member of the National Democratic Congress. He is the member of parliament for the Yilo Krobo constituency in the Eastern Region of Ghana.

== Early life and education ==
Tetteh hails from Somanya, a town in the Eastern Region. He holds a Commonwealth Executive MBA in Management.

He holds BA in Political Science and Sociology from the University of Ghana. He has Management Training Certificates from a number of universities in the United States and United Kingdom. He pursued his doctorate degree in Business Management from the Swiss Management Center.

== Philanthropy ==
He donated ten LED bulbs to the University of Environment and Sustainable Development to help the university's electrification project.

== Personal life ==
Albert Tetteh Nyakotey is a Christian.
