= Kwame Darko (politician) =

Ghanaian politician and economist

Hon. Kwame Darko

Member of Parliament for Bibiani/Anhwiaso constituency
- In office 7 January 1993 – 7 January 1997
- President: Jerry John Rawlings
- Preceded by: A. O. F. Tawiah
- Succeeded by: Seidu Paakuna Adamu

Personal details
- Born: 3 March 1955 (age 71)
- Party: National Democratic Congress
- Education: University of Cape Coast
- Occupation: Politician / Teacher
- Profession: Economist

Kwame Darko (born 1955) is a Ghanaian politician and an economist, who served as member of parliament for Bibiani/Anhwiaso constituency in the Western Region of Ghana.

== Early life and education ==
Kwame Darko was born in 1955 in the western Region of Ghana. He attended the University of Cape Coast where he obtained his Bachelor of Arts degree in Economics and Sociology.

== Personal life ==
He is a Christian.

== Politics ==
Kwame Darko was elected in the 1992 Ghanaian parliamentary election representing the National Democratic Congress party as member of the first parliament of the fourth republic of Ghana. He succeeded A. O. F. Tawiah of the People's National Party(PNP). He lost the seat during the 1996 Ghanaian general election to Seidu Paakuna Adamu of the National Democratic Congress, who won the seat with 24,437 votes out of the 37,712 valid votes cast representing 52.30% over his opponents Christopher Addae a New Patriotic Party (NPP) member and Moses Jasi-Addae an Every Ghanaian Living Everywhere (EGLE) member who polled 13,275 votes representing 28.40% of the share and 0 vote respectively.

== Career ==
Kwame Darko was a member of parliament for Bibiani from 7 January 1993 to 7 January 1997.
