= Fortunate Atubiga =

Ghanaian politician

Member of the Ghana Parliament for Binduri
- In office 7 January 1993 – 6 January 2001
- Preceded by: New
- Succeeded by: Achidago B. Akugri

Personal details
- Born: 27 July 1950 Binduri, Upper East Region, Ghana
- Party: National Democratic Congress
- Occupation: Politician

Fortunate Atubiga (born 27 July 1950) is a Ghanaian politician. He was member of the First and Second Parliament of the Fourth Republic of Ghana representing the Binduri Constituency in the Upper East Region of Ghana.

== Early life and education ==
Atubiga was born on 27 July 1950, in the Upper East Region of Ghana. He was educated to GCE Ordinary Level.

== Politics ==
Atubiga was first elected into parliament on the ticket of the National Democratic Congress on 7 January 1993 after he was pronounced winner at the 1992 Ghanaian parliamentary election held on 29 December 1992.

He then retained his seat in the 1996 Ghanaian general election, polling 10,704 votes out of the 20,373 valid votes cast representing 40.70% over Asaana Dunstan Ayaribilla who polled 5,806 votes representing 22.10%, Mustafa who polled 2,654 votes representing 10.10% and Francis Aboko Ayariga who polled 1,209 votes representing 4.60% of the total votes cast.

He was succeeded by Achidago Bernard Akugri of the National Democratic Congress in the 2000 Ghanaian general elections.

== Personal life ==
Atubiga is a Christian.
