= Samuel Owusu Agyei =

Ghanaian politician

Hon. Sammuel Owusu Agyei

Member of Parliament for Effutu
- In office 7 January 2005 – 6 January 2009
- President: John Kufuor
- Preceded by: Mike Allen Hammah
- Succeeded by: Mike Allen Hammah

Personal details
- Party: New Patriotic Party
- Education: University of Wales
- Profession: Politician

Samuel Owusu Agyei is a Ghanaian politician and was the member of parliament for the Effutu constituency in the Central region of Ghana in the fourth parliament of the fourth republic of Ghana and a former minister of state for public sector reform

== Education ==
Agyei attended the University of Wales, where he obtained a Master of Science degree in economics.

== Politics ==
Agyei entered politics after being elected as the member of parliament for the Effutu Constituency in the Central region of Ghana in the 2004 Ghanaian general elections on the ticket of the New Patriotic Party. He thus represented the constituency in the fourth parliament of the fourth republic of Ghana from 7 January 2005 to 6 January 2009. Agyei served for only a term as the member of parliament for the Effutu constituency. He was ousted in the subsequent elections, the 2008 Ghanaian general elections, by the previous member of parliament for the same constituency in the third parliament of the fourth republic of Ghana, Mike Allen Hammah, of the major opposition party – the National Democratic Congress, with Mike Allen Hammah polling a total valid votes count of 12,010 votes against Hammah's valid vote count of 15,124. Agyei is a member of the New Patriotic Party.

He was also the former Minister of State for Public sector reform during the Ex-President of Ghana His Excellency John Agyekum Kuffour's regime.

=== 2004 Elections ===
Agyei was elected as the member of parliament in the 2004 Ghanaian general elections with 13,651 votes out of 26,710 total valid votes cast. This was equivalent to 51.1% of the total valid votes cast. He was elected over the incumbent member of parliament for the same region, Hammah Mike Allen of the National Democratic Congress; and Sunu-Nuquaye Stephen of the Convention People's Party, Adelina Dennis of the Great Consolidated Popular Party and; Frank Ebo Sam and Isaac Arthur Aidoo – two independent candidates. These obtained 46.6%, 1.4%, 0.3%, 0.2% and 0.4%, respectively, the total valid votes cast. Agyei was elected on the ticket of the New Patriotic Party. His constituency was a part of the 16 constituencies won by the New Patriotic Party in the Central region in that elections. In all, the New Patriotic Party won a total 128 of parliamentary seats in the fourth parliament of the fourth republic of Ghana.

== Personal life ==
Agyei is a Christian.

== See also ==
- List of MPs elected in the 2004 Ghanaian parliamentary election
