= Alex Seidu Sofo =

Ghanaian politician (1950–2020)

Hon. Alex Seidu Sofo

Member of Parliament for Damango-Daboya Constituency
- In office 5 January 2000 – 6 January 2009

Assemblyman for Ngbaripe/Hangaline Electoral Area
- President: John Kufuor

Personal details
- Born: 2 February 1950
- Died: 9 January 2020 (aged 69) West Gonja District Hospital
- Party: New Patriotic Party
- Occupation: Politician
- Profession: Teacher
- Chief from the Busunu Traditional Area (Chief Mfrawura)

Alex Seidu Sofo (2 February 1950 – 9 January 2020) was a Ghanaian politician. He served as a member of parliament for the Damango-Daboya constituency.

== Early life and education ==
Sofo was born on February 2, 1950, and is a native from Busunu in the current Savannah Region. He obtained his Teachers' certificate A in Education.

== Career ==
Sofo was a teacher by profession. He was also a Chief from the Busunu Traditional Area (Chief Mfrawura).

== Political career ==
Sofo was the Assemblyman for Ngbaripe/Hangaline Electoral Area before winning the 2000 Ghanaian Parliamentary elections on the ticket of the New Patriotic Party (NPP). He was the third Member of Parliament for Damongo-Daboya Constituency having succeeded Hon Mahama Shakan. He became a member of the third parliament of the fourth republic of Ghana during the 2000 Ghanaian general elections for the then Damongo-Daboya Constituency and also a member of the fourth parliament of the fourth republic of Ghana during the 2004 Ghanaian General Election for the same constituency on the ticket of the New Patriotic Party.

He was also Former Deputy Minister of Roads and Highways under the erstwhile President John Agyekum Kufuor administration.

== Elections ==
Sofo was elected as a Member of Parliament for the then Damongo-Daboya Constituency in the Northern Region of Ghana during the 2000 Ghanaian general elections after serving as an Assemblyman for Ngbaripe/Hangaline Electoral Area with a total vote cast of 8,012 representing 45.90% over his opponents; Nelson Y. Yakubu of the National Democratic Congress who had 7,665 votes which represent 43.90% of the total votes cast, Abudulai Adams of the People's National Convention who also polled 703 representing 4.00% of the total votes cast, Alidu Mahama of the Convention People's Party who polled 549 which represent 3.10% of total votes cast, Ewuntomah C. Boreche of the National Reform Party who also had 377 representing 2.20% and Skido A. Ewuntomah of the United Ghana Movement who polled 143 which represent 0.80% of the total votes cast. He was again elected as the member of parliament for the Damango-Daboya constituency of the Northern Region of Ghana in the 2004 Ghanaian general elections. He won on the ticket of the New Patriotic Party. His constituency was a part of the 8 parliamentary seats out of 26 seats won by the New Patriotic Party in that election for the Northern Region. The New Patriotic Party won a majority total of 128 parliamentary seats out of 230 seats. He was elected with 11,975 votes out of 24,723 total valid votes cast equivalent to 48.4% of total valid votes cast. He was elected over Benedict Kpeno of the People's National Convention, Ykubu Nelson Nyiniefo of the National Democratic Congress, Alidu Mahama of the Convention People's Party and Skido Alhassan of the Every Ghanaian Living Everywhere party. These obtained 2.1%, 47.2%, 1.5% and 0.7% respectively of total valid votes cast.

== Personal life ==
He was a Christian.

== Death ==
He died on January 9, 2020, at West Gonja District Hospital where he was receiving treatment.
