= Quarshie Godwin John =

Ghanaian politician

MP for Yilo Krobo
- In office 7 January 1993 – 6 January 1997
- President: Jerry John Rawlings

Personal details
- Born: Yilo Krobo, Eastern Region, Ghana
- Party: National Democratic Congress
- Education: Overseas Political Training Course
- Occupation: Politician
- Profession: Teacher

Quarshie Godwin John is a Ghanaian politician and a member of the First Parliament of the fourth Republic representing the Yilo Krobo constituency in Eastern Region of Ghana.

== Early life and education ==
Quarshie was born at Yilo Krobo in the Eastern Region of Ghana. He attended the Overseas Political Training Course and obtained his Diploma in political science.

== Politics ==
Quarshie was first elected into Parliament on the ticket of the National Democratic Congress for the Yilo Krobo Constituency in the Eastern Region of Ghana during the 1992 Ghanaian parliamentary election. He was defeated in the 1996 Ghanaian general election by Daniel Tekpertey who polled 22,688 votes out of the 100% valid votes cast representing 49.40% over his opponents Priscilla Esther Mensa Nee Krob who polled 6,482 votes representing 14.10%, Abayah Vicor Kwabla who polled 5,894 votes representing 2.80% and Lovelace Emmanuel Odonkor who polled 0 votes representing 0.00%.

== Career ==
Quarshie is a teacher by profession. He was a former member of Parliament for the Akropong constituency in the Eastern Region of Ghana.
