= Amidu =

Amidu is a Ghanaian given name and surname. Notable people with the surname include:

- Amidu Salifu (born 1992), Ghanaian football midfielder
- Amin Amidu Sulemana (born 1955), Ghanaian diplomat and politician
- Martin Amidu, Ghanaian politician and lawyer
