= Yilo Krobo (Ghana parliament constituency) =

Eastern region of Ghana

- constituency for the Parliament of Ghana
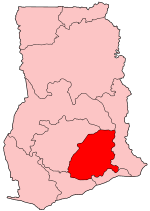
- District: Yilo Krobo District
- Region: Eastern Region of Ghana

Current constituency
- Party: National Democratic Congress (NDC)
- MP: Albert Tetteh Nyakotey

The Yilo Krobo constituency is in the Eastern region of Ghana. The current member of Parliament for the constituency is Albert Tetteh Nyakotey. He was elected on the ticket of the National Democratic Congress (NDC) and won a majority of 4,687 votes more than candidate closest in the race, to win the constituency election to become the MP. He had represented the constituency in the 4th Republican parliament.

On 21 January 2012, Raymond Tawiah lost the chance to represent the constituency for the third time. He was replaced by Kofi Amoatey who defeated the incumbent in the Primaries. On 7 December 2012 Kofi Amoatey standing on the ticket of the ruling National Democratic Congress, polled 26,581 votes representing 60.36% of valid votes cast to beat his closest rival Christian Kofi Tettey of the opposition New Patriotic Party who only managed 14,510 representing 32.95% despite having attempted to capture the seat in the last 5 parliamentary elections.

== Members of Parliament ==
First elected	Member	Party
First Republic - Yilo Krobo
1954	E. H. T. Korboe	Convention People's Party
Second Republic - Yilo-Osudoku
1969	George Tetteh Odonkor	National Alliance of Liberals
Third Republic - Yilo-Osudoku
1979	Emmanuel Kwadwo Obuadey	People's National Party
Fourth Republic - Yilo Krobo
1992	Priscilla Esther Korboe	Every Ghanaian Living Everywhere
1996	Daniel Tekpertey	National Democratic Congress
2004	Raymond Tawiah Abraham	National Democratic Congress
2012	Kofi Amoatey	National Democratic Congress
2020	Albert Tetteh Nyakotey	National Democratic Congress

== Election results ==
2024 Ghanaian general election: Yilo Krobo
Party	Candidate	Votes	%	±%
NDC	Albert Tetteh Nyakotey	25,625	56.74	+1.06
NPP	Richard Twum Barima Koranteng	19,122	42.34	−1.98
CPP	Aseni Ebenezer Tetteh	412		—
Majority		6,503	14.40	+3.04
Turnout		45,645		—
Registered electors				

2020 Ghanaian general election: Yilo Krobo
Party	Candidate	Votes	%	±%
NDC	Albert Tetteh Nyakotey	26,165	55.68	
NPP	Appertey Francis Djetse	20828	44.32	
Majority		5,337	11.36	
Turnout				—
Registered electors				

== See also ==
- List of Ghana Parliament constituencies
