= Kofi Amankwaa Peasah =

Ghanaian politician

MP for Amansie West
- In office 7 January 1993 – 6 January 1997
- President: Jerry John Rawlings
- Preceded by: Joseph Kofi Obeng
- Succeeded by: Anthony Boakye-Yiadom

Personal details
- Born: 18 February 1938 (age 88) Manso Nkwanta, Ashanti Region, Ghana
- Party: National Democratic Congress
- Education: University of Ghana
- Occupation: Politician
- Profession: Teacher

Kofi Amankwaa Peasah (born 18 February 1938) is a Ghanaian politician and a member of the first Parliament of the fourth Republic representing the Amansie West constituency in the Ashanti Region of Ghana. He represented the National Democratic Congress.

== Early life and education ==
Kofi Amankwaa Peasah was born on 18 February 1938 at Manso Nkwanta in the Ashanti Region of Ghana. He attended Mfantsipim School and the University of Ghana where he obtained his Bachelor of Arts degree in history.

== Politics ==
Peasah was elected into parliament on the ticket of the National democratic Congress for the Amansie West Constituency in the Ashanti Region of Ghana during the 1992 Ghanaian parliamentary election.

== Career ==
Peasah is a teacher by profession and a former member of parliament for the Amansie West Constituency in the Ashanti Region of Ghana. He is a fellow of the Historical Society of Ghana.

== Personal life ==
He is a Christian.
