= Nkrabeah Effah Dartey =

Ghanaian politician

Hon. Nkrabeah Effah Dartey

Member of Parliament for Berekum Constituency
- In office 7 January 2005 – 6 January 2009
- President: John Kufuor
- Succeeded by: Kwaku Agyenim-Boateng

Member of Parliament for Berekum Constituency
- In office 7 January 2001 – 6 January 2005
- President: John Kufuor
- Preceded by: J.H. Owusu Acheampong

Personal details
- Born: 21 June 1953 (age 73)
- Party: New Patriotic Party
- Children: 4
- Education: Achimota School
- Profession: Lawyer

Nkrabeah Effah Dartey is a Ghanaian politician and was the Member of parliament for the Berekum constituency in the 3rd and 4th parliaments of the 4th republic of Ghana.

== Early life and education ==
Effah Dartey obtained his early education at Achimota School. He also attended Dormaa Secondary School and obtained his GCE A Level certificate.

== Career ==
Effah Dartey is a lawyer by profession. He practices in his own private law firm. Effah Dartey is a retired military officer who served in the Ghanaian Army. He was promoted to the rank of captain on 27 April 1983. On 14 August 1983 he exited from the Armed Forces. Effah Dartey run a national secretariat for the Petroleum Retailers Association from 1987 to 2001.

== Politics ==
Effah Dartey was elected as the member of parliament twice to represent the Berekum constituency in the Brong Ahafo region in the 2000 and 2004 Ghanaian General Elections. He has also worked as a Deputy Minister of Interior.

=== 2000 Elections ===
Effah Dartey was first elected as a member of parliament for the Berekum constituency in the 2000 Ghanaian General Elections. He thus represented the Berekum constituency in the 3rd parliament of the 4th republic of Ghana. He was elected with 23,288 votes out of 36,288 total valid votes cast. This was equivalent to 64.20% of total valid votes cast. He was elected over J.H. Owusu-Acheampong of the National Democratic Congress, Kofi Kumi Atta-Frimpong of the Convention People's Party, Dickson Kofi Nuako of the National Reform Party and Andrews Hinneh of the United Ghana Movement. These obtained 12,393 votes, 262 votes, 251 votes and 94 votes respectively of the total valid votes cast. This was equivalent to 34.20%, 0.70%, 0.7% and 0.3% respectively of the total valid votes cast. Effah Dartey was elected on the ticket of the New Patriotic Party. His constituency was a part of 14 parliamentary seats out of a total 21 seats won by the New Patriotic Party in that elections in the Brong Ahafo Region of Ghana. In all, the New Patriotic Party won a majority total of 100 parliamentary representation out of 200 parliamentary seats in the 3rd parliament of the 4th republic of Ghana.

=== 2004 Elections ===
Effah Dartey was re-elected as a member of parliament for the Berekum constituency in the 2004 Ghanaian General Elections. He thus represented the constituency in the 4th parliament of the 4th republic of Ghana. He was elected with 28,561 votes out of 47,635 total valid votes cast. This was equivalent to 60.0% of total valid votes cast. He was elected over only one other candidate, Stephen Oppong of the National Democratic Congress. He obtained 19,074 votes of the total valid votes cast. This was equivalent to 40.0% of total valid votes cast. Effah Dartey was re-elected on the ticket of the New Patriotic Party. His constituency was a part of 14 parliamentary seats out of a total 24 seats won by the New Patriotic Party in the Brong Ahafo region of Ghana in that elections. In all, the New Patriotic Party won a majority total of 114 parliamentary representation out of a total 230 seats in the 4th parliament of the 4th republic of Ghana.

== Personal life ==
Effah-Dartey is married with four children. He is a Christian.
