= Francis Yaw Osei Sarfo =

Ghanaian politician

Hon. Francis Yaw Osei Sarfo

Member of Parliament for Krachi West Constituency
- In office 7 January 2009 – 6 January 2013
- President: John Atta Mills; John Mahama

Member of Parliament for Krachi West Constituency
- In office 7 January 2005 – 6 January 2009
- President: John Kufuor
- Preceded by: New Constituency

Personal details
- Born: 1 October 1955 (age 71)
- Party: National Democratic Congress
- Education: University of Ghana
- Profession: Administrator, Politician

Francis Yaw Osei Sarfo is a Ghanaian politician who served as the member of parliament for the Krachi West Constituency.

== Early life and education ==
Francis was born on 1 October 1955. He hails from Bejamse, a town in the Volta Region of Ghana. He obtained his BA in Political Science and Geography from the University of Ghana in 1981. He also had his PLC from the Ghana School of Law.

== Career ==
He is an administrator. He was the managing director of Akpabe Impex Limited. He was also the District Chief Executive from September 1996 to January 2001.

== Politics ==
He is a member of the National Democratic Congress. He was the member of parliament for Krachi West Constituency in the Volta region of Ghana.

=== 2004 Elections ===
Sarfo was elected as the member of parliament for the Krachi West constituency in the 2004 Ghanaian general elections. He was thus the member of parliament for the Krachi West constituency in the fourth parliament of the fourth republic of Ghana.

He was elected with 15,687 votes out of 34,952 total valid votes cast. This was equivalent to 44.9% of the total valid votes vast. He was elected over Kofi Tarkum of the People's National Convention, Kofi Mensah Demitia of the New Patriotic Party; and Alhaji Abu Safiano Baba, Owusu Michael Kwasi and Apraku Kwadwo Sampson- all independent candidates. These obtained 23%, 25.4%,5.1%, 0.3% and 1.3% respectively of the total valid votes cast.

Sarfo was elected on the ticket of the National Democratic Congress. His constituency was a part of the 21 constituencies won by the National Democratic Congress in the Greater Accra region in that elections.

In all, the National Democratic Congress won a total 94 parliamentary seats in the fourth parliament of the fourth republic of Ghana.

== Personal life ==
He is married with six children. He identifies as a Christian.
