= Stephen Cobbinah B. Karikari =

Ghanaian politician

Hon. Stephen Cobbinah B. Karikari

Member of parliament for Amansie West constituency
- In office 7 January 2001 – 6 January 2005
- Preceded by: Anthony Boakye-Yiadom
- Succeeded by: Kofi Krah Mensah

Personal details
- Party: New Patriotic Party
- Occupation: Politician

Stephen Cobbinah Buor-Karikari is a Ghanaian politician and a member of the Third Parliament of the Fourth Republic who served for the Amansie West constituency in the Ashanti Region of Ghana.

== Politics ==
Buor-Karikari was a member of the 3rd parliament of the 4th republic of Ghana. He was elected during the 2000 Ghanaian general election representing the New Patriotic Party. He polled 28,657 votes representing 77.82%. He lost the seat in 2004 to Kofi Krah Mensah of (NPP).

== Career ==
Buor-Karikari is a former member of Parliament for the Amansie West constituency in the Ashanti region of Ghana. Prior to entering politics, he was a lecturer at the University of Cape Coast.
