= Mohammed Adams Sukparu =

Ghanaian politician

Hon. Mohammed Adams Sukparu
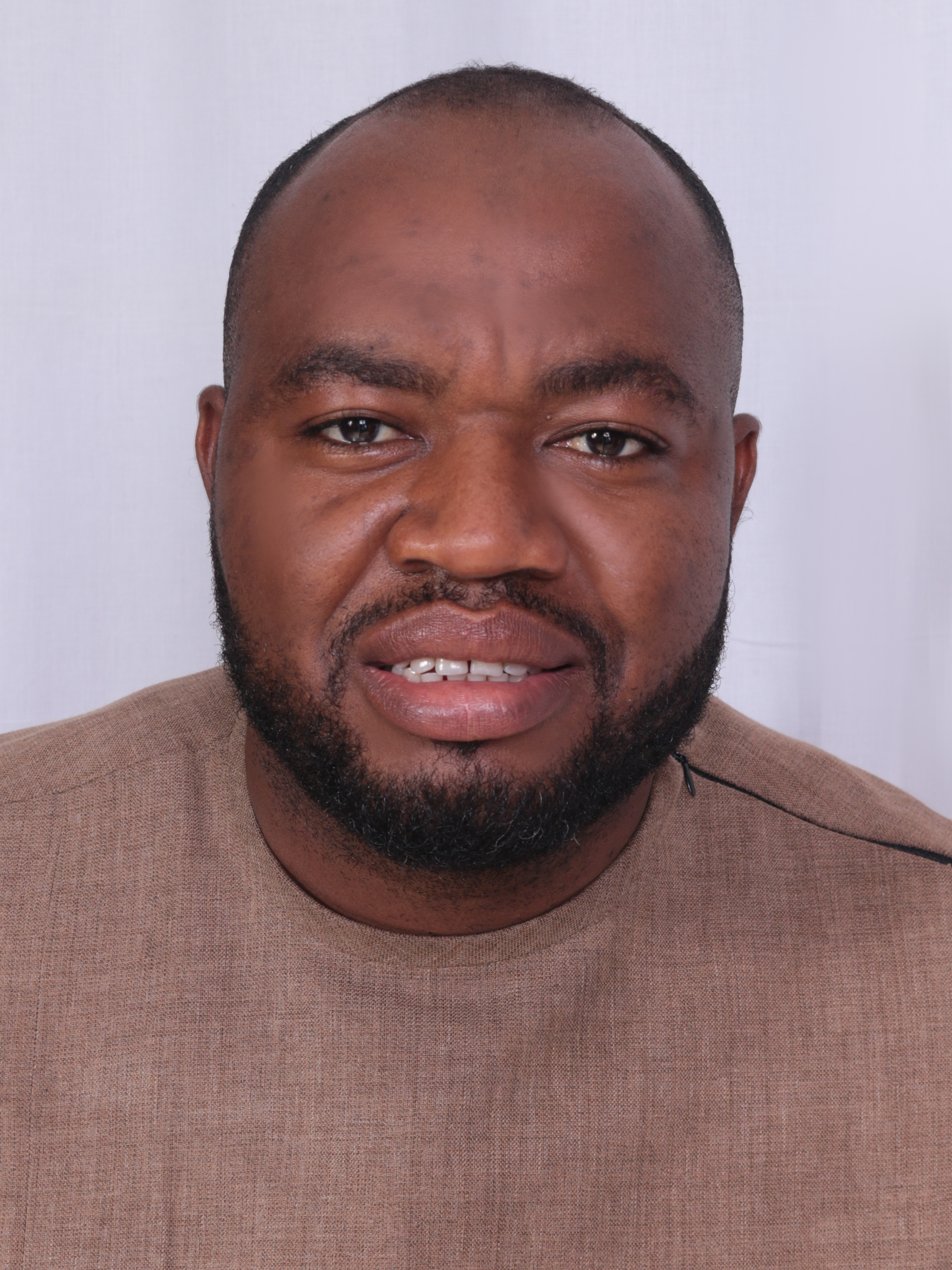

Member of Parliament for Sissala West Constituency
- Incumbent
- Assumed office 7 January 2021

Personal details
- Education: University of Professional Studies

Mohammed Adams Sukparu (born 6 January 1985) is a Ghanaian politician who is a member of the National Democratic Congress. He is the member of Parliament for the Sissala West Constituency in the Upper West Region.

== Early life and education ==
Sukparu was born on 6 January 1985, he hails from Bouti in the Sissala West District in the Upper West Region of Ghana. He attended the University of Professional Studies Accra (UPSA). He was a student leader and served as the president of the Private Universities Students' Association of Ghana (PUSAG). During his time as PUSAG President, he brought a lot of vibrancy and advocacy into the student front. He also served as Ghana's representative to the All-Africa Students Union (ASSU).

== Personal life ==
Mohammed Adams Sukparu is a muslim.

== Politics ==
=== Member of parliament ===
Sukparu entered the race for the parliamentary candidate in the NDC primaries in the Sissala West Constituency ahead of the 2020 elections. Sukparu won the parliamentary bid to represent the National Democratic Congress for the Constituency ahead of the 2020 elections in August 2019 after securing 345 votes to beat his two other opponents Mumuni Hakeem Duwiejuah and Mary Hagbana Abu who had 235 votes and 35 votes respectively.

In December 2020, Sukparu won the seat for Sissala West Constituency in the parliamentary elections after polling 17,731 votes representing 52.54% against his closest opponent, Naliwie Baluwie Salifu of the New Patriotic Party, a former District Chief Executive for the Sissala West District, who had 13,994 votes representing 43.87%.
