= Busunu =

Town in Savannah Region, Ghana

- Town
- Location of Busunu in Savannah Region
- Coordinates: 09°09′54″N 01°30′24″W
- Country: Ghana
- Region: Savannah Region
- District: West Gonja Municipality
- Time zone: UTC0 (GMT)

Busunu is a town in the West Gonja Municipality in the Savannah Region of Ghana. As at 2019, the Paramount Chief of the town was Chief Langateri-Wura Salifunu Sulimana II who passed on after 26 years reign. As at 2020, the Paramount Chief of the town was Busunuwura Monasa Jonokpowu II.

== Tourism ==
The Mole National Park inaugurated the 2024 close season observation in the town.

== Education ==
John Mahama in 2026 announced plans to establish a STEM school in the town. The St. Peter Canisius R/C Junior High School is located in the town.

== Health ==
Busunu Health Center is located in the town.

== Notable natives ==
- Yakubu Yussif Castro, Municipal Chief Executive for the West Gonja District
- Hajia Abiba Nneba, the mother of President John Dramani Mahama
- Alex Seidu Sofo, Ghanaian politician
- Alhaji Ibrahim Iddrisu, Chief Imam of the town
- Alhaji Amidu Braimah, Chief of Fulanis in the town.
- Dari Osman Thomas, Assemblyman of the town.
