= Nana Awuah Darko Ampem I =

Ghanaian financier and tribal chief

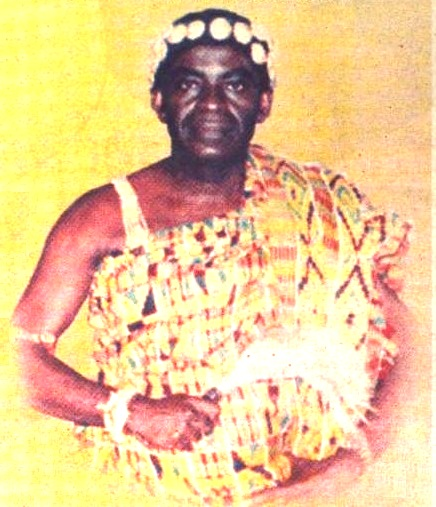
- Born: 1932
- Died: 2005 (aged 72–73)
- Occupations: Financier, Chief
- Known for: Founding Vanguard Assurance
- Spouse: Judith Ellen Awuah- Darko
- Children: Daniel Awuah-Darko; Harold Quarshie Awuah-Darko; Kingsley Kwame Awuah-Darko; David Awuah-Darko

Nana Awuah Darko Ampem (1932–2005) was a Ghanaian financier and chief. He founded Vanguard Assurance in October 1974 and was chairman of the company until his death in November 2005. He also held traditional office as Nkosuohene (progress chief) of Asante Juaben from 1985 until his death. He was a founding member of CAL Bank in 1990 and was a director of the bank’s board until his death.

== Early life ==
Nana Awuah Darko Ampem was born in 1932 as Daniel Quarshie Awuah Darko. He attended Accra Academy for secondary education, completing in 1951.

== Finance career ==
Nana Awuah Darko Ampem worked as an insurance broker with Lloyds in England. In 1969, he established Marine and General Insurance Brokers in Ghana. Marine and General Insurance Brokers was the first insurance brokering firm in Ghana. In 1972, he became the first president of the Chartered Institute of Insurance Ghana. A law passed in 1972 made it obligatory for all state institutions in Ghana to deal directly with State Insurance Company and not through a broker, bringing Awuah Darko's brokering business to a halt. Compelled by this law, Awuah-Darko started Vanguard Assurance in 1974. Vanguard Assurance is the first indigenous privately owned insurance company in Ghana.

Awuah Darko was a father-figure to many Ghanaian entrepreneurs who were to later come into the insurance industry. A notable example was Kwesi Essel-Koomson of KEK Insurance Brokers, for whom Awuah-Darko had suggested and encouraged to pursue an insurance career.

Nana Awuah-Darko Ampem was the Chairman of the Juaben Rural Bank from its inception in October 1984 until his death in December 2005. He was a co-founder and chairman of the Ghana Leasing Company Limited. In 1990, Awuah Darko was amongst the three founding directors of CAL Merchant Bank. He led the founding of City Investments Company Limited in 1995, a finance house which was later to be the parent company of Premium Bank after his death. He was a Council member of the Ghana Stock Exchange and a member of the Asanteman Finance Advisory Committee.

== Chieftaincy ==
In 1985, the Asantehene first made room for the enstoolment of an Nkosuohene (which means progress chief) in Asante. Following his overlord, the Asantehene's lead, the Juabenhene, Nana Otuo Siriboe selected Nana Awuah Darko Ampem to become the Nkosuohene of Asante Juaben. As a progress chief, he appropriately served as Chairman of the Juaben Rural Bank.

== Sports ==
Nana Awuah Darko Ampem was the first Ghanaian Captain of the Accra Polo Club. In later life, he became a member of the board of trustees of the Accra Polo Club. Nana was also a former Chairman and a life patron of the Ghana Squash Association.

== Personal life ==
Nana Awuah Darko Ampem was married to Judith Ellen Awuah-Darko. They had four children.

Awuah Darko died on Sunday 25 November 2005 at the 37 Military Hospital in Accra and was buried on 23 February 2006.
