= Mark Anthony Awuni =

Ghanaian politician (1940–2024)

Hon. Mark Anthony Awuni

Member of Parliament for Binduri Constituency
- In office 7 January 2005 – 6 January 2009
- President: John Kufuor

Personal details
- Born: 10 June 1940
- Died: 11 February 2024 (aged 83) Bawku, Ghana
- Party: National Democratic Congress
- Education: Claver House Institute, London
- Profession: Teacher

Mark Anthony Awuni (10 June 1940 – 11 February 2024) was a Ghanaian politician. He was the Member of Parliament representing Binduri constituency of the Upper East Region of Ghana in the 4th Parliament of the 4th Republic of Ghana. He was a member of the National Democratic Congress.

== Early life and education ==
Mark Anthony Awuni was born on 10 June 1940. He studied at Claver House Institute. He held a Diploma in Education from the institute.

== Career ==
Awuni was a teacher by profession.

== Political career ==
Awuni was a member of the National Democratic Congress. He became a member of parliament from January 2005 after emerging winner in the General Election in December 2004. He was elected as the member of parliament for the Binduri constituency in the fourth parliament of the fourth Republic of Ghana.

== Elections ==
Awuni was elected as the member of parliament for the Binduri constituency of the Upper East Region of Ghana for the first time in the 2004 Ghanaian general elections. He won on the ticket of the National Democratic Congress. His constituency was a part of the 9 parliamentary seats out of 13 seats won by the People's National Convention in that election for the Upper East Region. The National Democratic Congress won a minority total of 94 parliamentary seats out of 230 seats. He was elected with 9,797 votes out of 19,939 total valid votes cast. This was equivalent to 49.1% of total valid votes cast. He was elected over Yakubu Stephen of the New Patriotic Party, Barichie Tilata Yakubu of the Convention People's Party and Aboyella Charles an independent candidate. These obtained 6,216, 199 and 3727 votes respectively of total votes cast. These were equivalent to 31.2%, 1.0% and 18.7% respectively of total valid votes cast.

== Personal life and death ==
Awuni was a Christian. He died on 11 February 2024, at the age of 83.

== See also ==
- List of MPs elected in the 2004 Ghanaian parliamentary election
