= John Agyabeng =

Ghanaian politician

Hon. John Agyabeng
- Constituency: Agona East

Member of Parliament
- In office January 2009 – 2012
- President: John Atta Mills
- Constituency: Agona East

Personal details
- Born: 14 February 1965 (age 61)
- Party: New Patriotic Party
- Children: 5
- Occupation: Educationist

John Agyabeng (born February 14, 1965) is a Ghanaian, educationist and politician. He was the Member of Parliament for the Agona Dunkwa constituency in the 5th parliament of the 4th Republic of Ghana.

== Early life and education ==
Agyabeng was born on 14 February 1965. His hometown is Agona Dunkwa in the Central Region of Ghana. He obtained a Bachelor of Education and Diploma in Geography from University of Cape Coast in 1993. In 2008, he obtained an executive Masters of Governance and Leadership from Ghana Institute of Management and Public Administration.

== Career ==
Agyabeng was a tutor at the Nsaba Presbyterian School under the Ghana Education Service. He then worked from 2001 to 2005 as a District Chief Executive at the Agona East District in the Central Region of Ghana. He became a member of Parliament for the fourth parliament of the fourth republic of Ghana and a member of the fifth parliament for the fourth republic of Ghana.

Agyabeng was a District Chief Executive (DCE) for the then Agona District under Ex-President His Excellency John Agyekum Kufuor's regime.

He was a farmer and started his farming career in the year 1998. He was adjudged the overall District Farmer on the 1 December 2017 at the 33rd National Farmers’ Day celebration held at Agona Duotu in the Central region of Ghana.

== Politics ==
Agyabeng represented the Agona East constituency in the Central Region of Ghana as the Member of Parliament in the fifth parliament of the fourth Republic of Ghana during the 2008 Ghanaian general elections. He was elected on the ticket of the New Patriotic Party. He was elected with 15,125 votes equivalent to 49.62% of total votes cast. Theophilus F. Maranga of the National Democratic Congress and Magnus Idan of the Democratic Freedom Party lost to him in that election after obtaining 49.51% and 0.87% of total votes cast respectively. He retained his seat during the 2004 Ghanaian general election as a member of the fourth parliament of the fourth republic of Ghana. He obtained a total vote cast of 18,030 representing 57.60% over his other candidates, Theophilus Fuseini Maranga an independent candidate who pulled a total vote of 7,427 representing 23.70%, Kweku Adu Yeboah of the National Democratic Congress who obtained 5,515 votes cast representing 17.60% and Stephen Kwame of the Nkrumah People's National Convention also pulled a total vote of 339 representing 1.10% during the 2004 Ghanaian general elections.

== Personal life ==
Agyabeng is married with 5 children. He is a Christian.
