= Kosi Kedem =

Ghanaian politician

Member of Parliament for Hoheo South Constituency
- In office 7 January 1993 – 6 January 2005
- Succeeded by: Joseph Zaphenat Amenowode

Personal details
- Born: 15 April 1945 (age 81) Hoheo South
- Party: National Democratic Congress
- Education: University of Ghana; University of Cape Coast
- Occupation: Politician
- Profession: Librarian

Kosi Kedem (born 15 April 1945) is a Ghanaian politician and a member of the Second and Third Parliament of the Fourth Republic representing the Hohoe south Constituency in the Volta Region of Ghana.

== Early life and education ==
Kedem was born on 15 April 1945, at Hohoe south in the Volta Region of Ghana. He attended the University of Ghana where he obtained his Bachelor of Arts. He also attended the University of Cape Coast and studied Philosophy, Library and obtained his Master in Philosophy.

== Career ==
Kedem was a former member of Parliament for the Hohoe South Constituency in the Volta Region of Ghana. He is also a librarian.

== Politics ==
Kedem was elected into the first parliament of the fourth republic of Ghana on 7 January 1993 after he was pronounced winner at the 1992 Ghanaian parliamentary election held on 29 December 1992.

He was then re-elected into the second parliament of the fourth republic of Ghana on the ticket of the National Democratic Congress during the December 2000 Ghanaian General elections for the Hohoe South Constituency in the Volta Region of Ghana.

== Elections ==
Kedem was elected as the member of parliament for the Hohoe South constituency in the 2000 Ghanaian general elections. He was elected on the ticket of the National Democratic Congress.

His constituency was a part of the 17 parliamentary seats out of 19 seats won by the National Democratic Congress in that election for the Volta Region. The National Democratic Congress won a minority total of 92 parliamentary seats out of 200 seats in the 3rd parliament of the 4th republic of Ghana.

He was elected with 13,306 votes out of 29,033 total valid votes cast. This was equivalent to 47.3% of the total valid votes cast. He was elected over Bennett K. Dokey of the New Patriotic Party, Delali Ndo an independent candidate, James Flolu of the Convention People's Party and Brese R. Senyo of the National Reformed Party.

These obtained 9,043, 4,489, 834 and 450 votes respectively out of the total valid votes cast. These were equivalent to 32.2%, 16%, 3% and 1.6% respectively of total valid votes cast.

== Personal life ==
Kedem is a Christian.
