= George Aggudey =

Ghanaian politician

George Aggudey (born 13 April 1945) is a Ghanaian politician. He is a member of the Convention People's Party (CPP).

Running as the CPP presidential candidate in the 7 December 2004 presidential election, he finished last out of four candidates, winning 1.0% of the vote. His running mate was Bright Kwame Ameyaw.

Party political offices
Preceded by George Hagan	Convention People's Party Presidential Candidate; 2004	Succeeded by Paa Kwesi Nduom
