= Solomon Kwabena Sarfoh =

Ghanaian politician

Hon. Solomon Kwabena Sarfoh

Member of parliament for Mampong constituency
- In office 07 January 1997 – 06 January 2005
- Preceded by: George Akosa
- Succeeded by: Peter Abum Sarkodie

Personal details
- Party: New Patriotic Party
- Occupation: Politician

Solomon Kwabena Sarfoh is a Ghanaian politician and a former member of parliament for the Mampong constituency of the Ashanti Region of Ghana. He was a member of the 3rd parliament and a former chairman of the parliament select committee for roads and transport.

== Early life and Education ==
Sarfoh was born in Mampong, a town in the Ashanti Region of Ghana.

== Politics ==
Sarfoh was first elected into Parliament on the ticket of the New Patriotic Party during the December 2996 Ghanaian Elections. He polled 21,183 votes out of the 29,385 valid votes cast representing 59.50% against Elizabeth Nico a lNDC member who polled 8,202 votes representing 23.00%.

Sarfoh was a member of the 2nd and 3rd parliament of the 4th republic of Ghana and a politician of the New Patriotic Party. He was elected as a member of parliament for the mampong constituency during the 2000 Ghanaian general election with 21,183 votes. He retained his seat in the 2000 general elections with a total of 23,352 making 74.30% of the total valid votes cast that year.

He lost the seat in the 2004 delegate elections to Peter Abum Sarkodie of the same party. He was later appointed me as the chairman for the parliamentary select committee for road and transport.
