= Christopher Addae =

Ghanaian politician

- Preceded by: Seidu Paakuna Adamu
- Succeeded by: Kingsley Aboagye-Gyedu

MP for Bibiani-Anhwiaso-Bekwai
- In office 7 January 2005 – 6 January 2013

Personal details
- Born: 25 February 1963 (age 63)
- Party: New Patriotic Party
- Education: University of Ghana
- Occupation: Politician
- Profession: Administrator

Christopher Addae is an administrator and Ghanaian politician who served as the member of the Fifth parliament of the Fourth Republic representing the Bibiani-Anhwiaso-Bekwai Constituency of the Western Region of Ghana. After he emerged the winner of the poll in his constituency in the 2008 Ghanaian general elections.

== Early life and education ==
Addae was born on 25 February 1963. He hails from Nambro-Sefwi Anhwiaso in the Western Region of Ghana. He obtained his Master of Arts degree in international affairs from University of Ghana in 1992.

== Career ==
Addae worked as Manager and an Administrator. He was the District Chief Executive of Bibiani-Anhwiaso-Bekwai from 2001 to 2005.

== Politics ==
Addae was first elected into Parliament in December 2004 after the completion of the 2004 Ghanaian general elections. He also served as the member of parliament representing the Bibiani-Anhwiaso-Bekwai Constituency in the Western region under the umbrella of the New Patriotic Party, gaining 24,241 vote cast out of 48,624 valid votes in his Constituency.

== Personal life ==
Addae is married. He is a Christian and a member of the Seventh Day Adventist Church.
