= Damango-Daboya (Ghana parliament constituency) =

Ghana parliament constituency

- constituency for the Parliament of Ghana
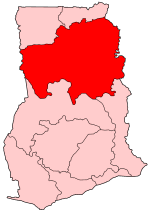
- District: West Gonja District
- Region: Northern Region of Ghana

Current constituency
- Party: National Democratic Congress
- MP: Sammy B. Wusah

Damango-Daboya is one of the constituencies represented in the Parliament of Ghana. It elects one Member of Parliament (MP) by the first past the post system of election. It is located in the Northern Region of Ghana. he current member of Parliament for the constituency is Sammy B. Wusah. He was elected on the ticket of the National Democratic Congress (NDC) and won a majority of 2,454 votes more than candidate closest in the race, to win the constituency election to become the MP. He succeeded Alex Seidu Sofo who had represented the constituency in the 4th Republican parliament on the ticket of the New Patriotic Party (NPP).

== See also ==
- List of Ghana Parliament constituencies

List of past and current MP's: 1993 - 1996 --> Hon. Edward Aliedong Alhassan; 1997 - 2000 --> Hon. Adam Mahama; 2001 - 2004 --> Hon. Alex Seidu Sofo; 2005 - 2008 --> Hon. Alex Seidu Sofo; 2009 - 2012 --> Hon. Sammy B. Wusah; 2013 - 2016 --> Hon. Adam Mutawakilu; 2017 - 2020 --> Hon. Adam Mutawakilu;
