= Kwame Awuah-Darko =

Ghanaian politician and banker

- Born: Kingsley Kwame Awuah-Darko; January 4, 1969 (age 57); Accra, Ghana
- Education: Kwame Nkrumah University of Science and Technology (Hons) (LLB); Henley Business School (Mba)
- Occupation: Politician
- Known for: Founder of Matrix Holdings International co-founder of Roman Ridge School
- Political party: National Democratic Congress
- Parent: Nana Awuah Darko Ampem I

Kwame Awuah-Darko (born January 4, 1969) is a Ghanaian politician, entrepreneur and a banker. He is the 3rd son of the late Nana Awuah-Darko Ampem I, who reigned as the Nkosuohene of Asante Juaben traditional area in the Ashanti Region of Ghana from June 1985 till his demise on November 25, 2005.

== Early life and education ==
Kwame Awuah-Darko was born in Accra on January 4, 1969. He is a native of the Ashanti kingdom and the Akyem Abuakwa State. Kwame Awuah-Darko is the third son of Nana Awuah-Darko Ampem I, the Nkosuohene of Asante Juaben traditional area in the Ashanti Region. He started his primary education at Christ the King International School, in Cantonments in Accra, where he sat for his common entrance examinations in June 1981 and gained admission to St. Peters School at Nkwatia, Kwahu, in the Eastern Region of Ghana in September 1981. Kwame subsequently left St Peter's in October 1985, to complete his Secondary Education at the Ghana International School in Accra, where he completed his (O'Levels) Ordinary Level education in June 1986.

Kwame Awuah-Darko the proceeded to the Achimota Secondary School Achimota School for his sixth form education, which he completed in June 1988.

After completing a year of mandatory National Service, teaching mathematics and English at the Pinanko Wassa Junior Secondary School in the Central Region of Ghana. He gained admission to the Social Sciences Faculty of the then University of Science and Technology (UST) in 1989.

Kwame Awuah-Darko graduated with a B.A. Law (Hons) Degree from the Kwame Nkrumah University of Science and Technology, Kumasi.

In 1998 Kwame Awuah-Darko gained admission to then Henley Management College, Henley Business School, Greenlands, Henley on Thames United Kingdom and graduated with a DBA in 1999.

== Personal life ==
Kwame Awuah-Darko is married to Nana Yaa Oteng and he has three sons. Kwame is brother to Daniel Awuah-Darko, Nana Awuah-Darko Ampem II (Formerly, Harold Quarshie Awuah-Darko) and David Awuah-Darko.

== Career ==
Kwame Awuah-Darko founded Money Systems International (MSI) in the year 1999, as managing director of MSI Ltd, he oversaw the company's growth from a modest U.K. to Ghana international money transfer business into a US$200 million business turnover, with operations in seven (7) European countries, win (9) States in the US and eighteen (18) African countries. Kwame Awuah-Darko is a co-founder of the Roman Ridge School in Accra, Ghana and has served on the board of directors since its inception in 2002 till date. He served as board member of State Insurance Company (SIC) Limited as well as board chairman of the SIC Financial Services Limited respectively from 2009 to 2012. In addition, Kwame served as Director and board member of City Investment Company Limited. He contributed to the establishment Commercial Bank, a financial institution in Ghana. Awuah-Darko currently serves on the board of the Roman Ridge School which he co-founded.

In the year 1999, aged 30, he founded Matrix International Holdings Limited, U.K. As managing director of Matrix International Holdings U.K. Ltd, he oversaw the company's growth and operations in seven (7) European Union countries and eighteen (18) African countries rolled-out in West, East and Southern Africa with an annual turnover in excess of US$200 Million. He managed Matrix Holdings concurrently with Marine and General Insurance Brokers.

== Politics ==
In 2012, Kwame was elected to run for parliament as the candidate representing the Ayawaso West Wuogon Constituency under the National Democratic Congress (NDC).

In October 2013, he was appointed by the Government of Ghana to serve as the managing director of Ghana's largest Petroleum Storage and Logistics Company, Bulk Oil Storage and Transportation Company Limited (BOST). He established a petroleum-trading department within the company, trading mainly petroleum products such as Gasoline, Gasoil, LPG and Crude Oil.

The government of Ghana in June 2015, appointed Kwame Awuah as the chief executive officer of Ghana's National Petroleum Refinery Asset, the Tema Oil Refinery (TOR).

Under his leadership, BOST and TOR expanded the trade of petroleum products across West Africa, including exports of gasoline and gasoil to Mali, Niger, Burkina Faso, Ivory Coast, Benin, Nigeria, and Liberia.

== Achievements ==
=== Strategic Petroleum Reserve Program ===
Awuah-Darko instituted the Strategic Petroleum Reserve Program and with his team managed to secure credit lines to import petroleum products from inception without any financial contribution from central Government. BOST started importing its own products for the Strategic Reserve Program from February 4, 2015, and by January 6, 2017, BOST had imported over 52 cargoes of refined petroleum products and 17 cargoes of LPG, making a trade turnover of $1.6 billion earning profit of up to $61 million, a feat never achieved in the company's 24 years of existence. Through this program BOST held Strategic Petroleum Reserve stock of up to 12 weeks of national petroleum consumption. Therefore, in case of an emergency Ghana had 12 weeks buffer of petroleum products.

=== GOIL Shares ===
Awuah-Darko led BOST in the acquisition of a strategic stake in the largest oil retail network across the country by acquiring 20% shares in GOIL to ensure the protection of the Ghanaian Taxpayer, making BOST the 3rd largest shareholder of GOIL.

=== TOR Revamping ===
On given the additional mandate of heading the Tema Oil Refinery, Awuah-Darko assisted in the revival of the Tema Oil Refinery after years of non-operability via BOST and imported up to 9 million barrels of crude oil stocks out of which 7 million barrels was refined by TOR during his tenure as CEO and leaving 2 million barrels in tank on his exit from TOR. He also initiated and purchased the first indigenous crude the refinery produced from Ghana's TEN fields. He ended his tenure at TOR in January 2017 leaving 205,279 metric tons of Petrol and Diesel as stock in-tank plus crude oil stock from then TEN fields.

=== Restoration of National Distribution Network ===
Under Awuah-Darko's leadership BOST was able to restore five (5) of its 6 (six) fuel depots from the state of non-operational and several years of delinquency, specifically the Accra Plains Depot (which was half-fit), Kumasi Depot, Buipe Depot, Akosombo Depot and the Bolgatanga Depot which was restored to begin product export into the Sahelian market such as Burkina Faso and Mali, a strategy which generated foreign exchange for the Country.

In addition, the longest pipeline in the BOST network of 271 km from Buipe to Bolgatanga was re-commissioned to enable swift, easy and low-cost transmission of BOST products across the country, from the Southern part to the Northern part.

=== Deregulation Policy ===
With the help of the Minister of Petroleum, Minister of Finance, National Petroleum Authority and other stake holders, they implemented a petroleum pricing deregulation policy.

=== Organizational Restructuring ===
Awuah-Darko implemented an organizational restructuring exercise at BOST to introduce efficiency and motivation among working staff. As a result of expansion in BOST's activities, he created jobs and grew the staff strength from 245 to 487. Subsequently, staff monthly payroll increased by 227%, from Ghs484,738 to Ghs2,135,240 between early 2014 to January 6, 2017.

=== BOST Office Building ===
Awuah-Darko commissioned a twin 10-storey office complex in Accra to curb the consistent overpriced office rent charges. The project was being financed by the Contractor who also owned the land, BOST was to take custody of the office complex upon completion and to be paid off from internal profits BOST was generating spread over a period.

=== Initiated Projects ===
On leaving both BOST and TOR on January 6, 2017, Awuah-Darko handed over strategic projects he initiated but were uncompleted, namely;

- The Tema to Akosombo pipeline which was partly completed
- BOST had started the process to automate all the depots across the country through an internally generated fund (IGF).
- Awuah-Darko had secured funding of up to $600 million and commenced feasibility studies on a 150,000 metric ton storage facility to be constructed at Pumpuni near Takoradi.

=== Honours and awards ===
In 2017 Awuah-Darko was awarded the Oil and Gas Leadership Awards 2017 in recognition of his exemplary and flawless track record as head of Ghana's Tema Oil Refinery (TOR) and Bulk Oil Storage and Transportation Company (BOST).

The Kwame Nkrumah University for Science and Technology recognizing Awuah-Darko's advocacy for the institutions cause named him Alumni of the Year in 2016.

The University of Ghana's Student Representative Council (UGSRC) in 2013 awarded Awuah-Darko with their prestigious "Emerging National Leader of the year award.
