= George Kuntu Blankson =

Ghanaian politician (born 1957)

Hon. George Kuntu Blankson
- Constituency: Mfantseman East

Member of Parliament
- In office 7 January 2009 – 6 January 2013
- President: John Atta Mills
- Constituency: Mfantseman East
- Majority: NDC

Personal details
- Born: 25 December 1957 (age 68)
- Party: National Democratic Congress
- Children: 6
- Occupation: Social Scientist/Businessman

George Kuntu Blankson (born 25 December 1957) is a Ghanaian politician. He is a former Member of Parliament for the Ekumfi constituency which was formerly part of Mfantseman East Constituency.

== Early years and education ==
Kuntu Blankson born on 25 December 1960 at Ekumfi-Otuam, Central Region. He holds a bachelor's degree from Nico Lopez University in Cuba, obtained in 1987. He also had certificate in Education at Las Aspin Centre of Education in Washington DC, USA, obtained in 1999.

== Career ==
Kuntu Blankson is a social scientist and also a business man. Prior to becoming a member of parliament in January 2005, he worked as a District Chief Executive for the Mfantseman District in 1997 to 2001 and also as the managing director of Jesus Cares Enterprises Ltd.

== Personal life ==
Kuntu Blankson is a Christian, a member of church of Pentecost. He is married with six children.

== Political life ==
Kuntu Blankson is a member of the National Democratic Congress. He was the Member of Parliament for Mfantseman East Constituency in the Fifth Parliament of the Fourth Republic of Ghana after he was elected in the 2008 Ghanaian general election. He obtained 8,591 votes, equivalent to 48.0%, of the 17,893 valid votes cast. Albert Alex Amoah of the Convention People's Party, Ekow Esirifie-Buckman an independent candidate and Kwamina Amoasi Andoh of the New Patriotic Party lost the seat to him in that elections after obtaining 1.9%, 9.5% and 39.5% of total votes cast respectively. He was also the member of parliament for Mfantseman/Ekumfi Constituency in the Fourth Parliament of the Fourth Republic of Ghana during the 2004 Ghanaian general elections and he obtained a total votes of 8,385 votes representing 46.30% over other candidates, Kwamina Amoasi-Andoh of the New Patriotic Party who pulled a total votes of 6,773 representing 37.40% and Charles Kojo Imbeah of the Convention People's Party with 2,938 votes counts representing 16.20%.
