= Sammy B. Wusah =

Ghanaian politician and educationist

dates Sammy B. Wusah (born 15 December 1957) is a Ghanaian politician and educationist. He also served as the Member of Parliament for the Damango-Daboya constituency in the Northern Region of Ghana.

== Early life and education ==
Wusah was born on 15 December 1957 in Lingbensi-Daboya, Northern Region. He obtained a Bachelor of Education degree (Agriculture Science) UEW in 1999.

== Politics ==
Wusah was a member of the Fifth Parliament of the Fourth Republic of Ghana elected on the ticket of the National Democratic Congress (NDC) during the December 2008 Ghanaian general election as the member of Parliament for the Damango-Daboya constituency. He took the seat during the December 2008 Ghanaian general election from Alex Seidu Sofo with 2,450 votes out of the 25,364 valid votes cast = 49.1% and had the majority of the parliamentary seat. He lost the seat in 2012.

== Career ==
Prior to his appointment as Member of Parliament, he worked as a budget officer at the Ghana Education Service in West Gonja District, Damango.

== Personal life ==
Wusah is a Christian who fellowships at the Assemblies of God Church. He is married with four children.
