= Sissala West (Ghana parliament constituency) =

- constituency for the Parliament of Ghana
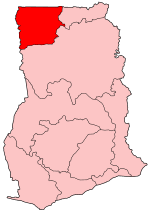
- District: Sissala West District
- Region: Upper West Region of Ghana

Current constituency
- Created: 2004
- Party: National Democratic Congress
- MP: Mohammed Adams Sukparu

Sissala West is one of the constituencies represented in the Parliament of Ghana. It elects one Member of Parliament (MP) by the first past the post system of election. Mohammed Adams Sukparu is the member of parliament for the constituency. Sissala West is located in the Sissala West district of the Upper West Region of Ghana.

This seat was created prior to the Ghanaian parliamentary election in 2004.

== Boundaries ==
The seat is located within the Sissala West District of the Upper West Region of Ghana. To the north is Burkina Faso. Its western neighbours are the Jirapa, Lambussie and Nadowli East constituencies. The Nadowli East constituency continues round the south and to the east is the Sissala East constituency.

== History ==
The constituency was first created in 2004 by the Electoral Commission of Ghana along with 29 other new ones, increasing the number of constituencies from 200 to 230. This was done by splitting the previous Sissala constituency into the Sissala East and Sissala West constituencies respectively.

== Members of Parliament ==
Election	Member	Party
2004	Haruna Bayirga	People's National Convention
2008	Haruna Bayirga	People's National Convention
2012	Amin Amidu Sulemana	National Democratic Congress
2016	Patrick Adama Al-Hassan	New Patriotic Party
2020	Mohammed Adam Sukparu	National Democratic Congress
2024	Mohammed Adam Sukparu	National Democratic Congress

== Elections ==
2008 Ghanaian parliamentary election:Sissala West Source:Ghana Home Page
Party	Candidate	Votes	%	±%
People's National Convention	Haruna Bayirga	5,950	37.1	—
National Democratic Congress	Robert Bakah Wavei	5,301	33.1	—
New Patriotic Party	George Hikah Benson	4,517	28.2	—
Convention People's Party	J.B. Adunah	197	1.2	—
Democratic Freedom Party	Ibrahim Lious	57	0.4	—
Majority		649	4.0	—
Turnout		—	—	—

== See also ==
- List of Ghana Parliament constituencies
