= Raymond Tawiah Abraham =

Ghanaian politician

Hon. Raymond Tawiah Abraham

Member of Ghana Parliament for Yilo Krobo constituency
- In office 7 January 2005 – 6 January 2013
- President: John Evans Atta Mills
- Preceded by: Daniel Tekpertey
- Succeeded by: Kofi Amoatey

Personal details
- Born: 10 January 1955 (age 71) Yilo Krobo, Eastern Region Gold Coast (now Ghana)
- Party: National Democratic Congress
- Children: 4
- Education: University of Ghana
- Occupation: Politician
- Profession: Executive director

Raymond Tawiah Abraham (born 10 January 1955) is a Ghanaian politician accountant who was a member of the fifth and fourth parliaments of the fourth Republic of Ghana, representing the Yilo Krobo constituency in Eastern Region.

== Early life and education ==
Abraham was born on 10 January 1955 in Yilo Krobo in the Eastern Region of Ghana. He comes from Somanya in the Eastern Region. He attended the University of Ghana and obtained a Diploma in Public administration. He obtained his MBA (Post Graduate School of Management, Paris, France) in 2006, acquired his BSc (Administration) UG in the year 2007 and had his EMGL (GIMPA) in the year 2008.

== Career ==
Abraham worked as the executive director of El Shaddai Medical Laboratory Limited. He is an accountant by profession and a former member of Parliament for the Yilo Krobo Constituency in the Eastern Region of Ghana.

== Politics ==
Abraham was elected into parliament on the ticket of the National Democratic Congress during the December 2004 Ghanaian General elections as a member of parliament of the fourth parliament of the Fourth Republic of Ghana for the Yilo Krobo Constituency in the Eastern Region of Ghana. He polled 20,685 votes out of the 36387 valid votes cast representing 56.80%. He contested again in the 2008 Ghanaian general elections and polled 18,345 votes out of the 34,896 valid votes cast representing 52.53% against his opponents, Christian Kofi Tettey of the New Patriotic Party who also obtained 13,658 votes count representing 39.11%, Francis Opai Tetteh of the Convention People's Party who polled a total vote count of 2,598 representing 7.44% and Terkpetey Fred Kwasi of the People's National Convention with a total vote count of 325 representing 0.93% making him retain his seat as a member of parliament for the Fifth Parliament of the Fourth Republic of Ghana for the Yilo Krobo Constituency in the Eastern Region of Ghana.

== Personal life ==
Abraham is a Christian and he a member of the Methodist church of Ghana. He is married with four children.
