= Samuel Kweku Obodai =

Ghanaian politician

Hon. Samuel Kweku Obodai
- Constituency: Agona West

Member of Parliament
- In office 7 January 2009 – 6 January 2013
- President: John Atta Mills

Personal details
- Born: 29 April 1960 (age 66)
- Party: New Patriotic Party
- Children: 4
- Education: University of Cape Coast
- Occupation: Chemist

Samuel Obodai is a chemist and Ghanaian politician. He was the Member of parliament for the Agona West constituency in the 5th parliament of the 4th republic of Ghana.

== Early life and education ==
Obodai was born on 29 April 1960. His hometown is Agona Nyakrom in the Central Region of Ghana. He graduated with a Bachelor of Science in Chemistry and a diploma in education from the University of Cape Coast in 1987. In 2008, he obtained a Master's of Arts in Democratic Governance and Leadership also from the University of Cape Coast.

== Career ==
Obodai is a chemist by profession. He has worked with Major & Co Manufacturing Company Limited.

== Politics ==
He represented the Agona West constituency as the Member of Parliament in the Fifth Parliament of the Fourth Republic of Ghana. In 2000, Mr. Obodai who stood for the Ghanaian general elections was chosen over Samuel Oppong of the National Democratic Congress, Kojo Anan of the National Reform Party, Mathew Caurie of the Convention People's Party, Abu Hamid Wanzam of the People's National Convention and Joseph Archibald Ankrah who also stood for the People's National Convention. Samuel emerged as winner with 21,233 votes which is equivalent to 57.50% of the votes. The NDC parliamentary candidate had 13,784 votes which represents 36.90%. Anan had 988 votes which is 2.60%. Mathew Caurie came 4th with 679 votes which is comparable to 1.80%. The two PNC parliamentary candidates Wanzam and Ankrah had 430 votes which is 1.20% and 0 votes respectively. Even though Obodai hopes to return to parliament, the NPP's National Vetting Committee has been petitioned to disqualify him. The Petitioner Samuel Krankye said in a letter to the committee that Obodai has not contributed to any program of the party.

== Personal life ==
Obodai is married with four children. He is a Christian and worships with the Church of Pentecost.
