= Joseph Kwaku Nayan =

Ghanaian politician

MP for Nkwanta North
- In office 7 January 2009 – 7 January 2013
- President: John Evans Atta Mills

Personal details
- Born: 22 May 1964 (age 62) Damanko, Volta Region Gold Coast (now Ghana)
- Party: New Patriotic Party
- Education: University of Education, Winneba
- Occupation: Politician
- Profession: Teacher

Joseph Kwaku Nayan is a teacher and Ghanaian politician who served as the member of parliament for the Nkwanta North Constituency in the 4th and 5th Parliament of the 4th Republic of Ghana.

== Early life and education ==
Joseph was born on 22 May 1964. He hails from Damanko a town in the Volta Region of Ghana. He obtained his Diploma in Education from the University of Education, Winneba in 2006. He further went to the University of Cape Coast where he is pursuing his master's degree in Governance and Leadership.

== Career ==
He is a Business man, an Educationist and a Public Servant. He was the Principal Superintendent and Headmaster of Damanko Junior High School. He was the former Deputy Volta Regional Minister. He was also the Deputy Chief Executive Officer in charge of support services at the Minerals Commission.

== Politics ==
He is a member of New Patriotic Party. He was elected into office as member of parliament to represent Nkwanta North Constituency in the Volta region of Ghana in January 2005. He contested for re-election into office for second term in the December 2012 elections and won with 9,426 votes out of 21,676 total valid votes in his Constituency

== Personal life ==
He is married with six children. He identifies as a Christian.
