= Joseph Zaphenat Amenowode =

Ghanaian politician and a lecturer

Joseph Zephinat Amenowode
- Born: Accra, Ghana
- Education: Kwame Nkrumah University of Science and Technology; Pratt Institute
- Occupations: Politician, Lecturer
- Office: Member of Parliament for Hohoe South
- Political party: National Democratic Congress
- Children: 7

Joseph Zephinat Amenowode is a Ghanaian politician and lecturer. He was a Member of Parliament for Hohoe South and was the Minister for the Volta Region of Ghana from January 2009 until his dismissal on 6 March 2012, he worked as a university lecturer prior to going into politics.

== Early life and education ==
Amenowode's family hails from Ve-Deme in the Hohoe Municipal District of the Volta Region, he was born in Accra, the capital of Ghana. He attended the Hohoe Evangelical Presbyterian Secondary School between 1966 and 1971 obtaining the General Certificate of Education (GCE) Ordinary Level, he proceeded to Kpando Secondary School for his sixth form education, completing the GCE Advanced Level in 1973. His undergraduate university education was at the Kwame Nkrumah University of Science and Technology where he obtained a Bachelor of Arts Honours degree in 1979, he continued for an extra year to complete a postgraduate diploma in 1980. In 1991, he obtained a master's degree from the same university, he attended the Pratt Institute in New York City where he completed a Master of Professional Studies degree in Art Therapy in 1997.

== Career ==
Amenowode was a lecturer at the University of Education Winneba in the Central Region of Ghana.He initially taught in the Ghana Education Service.

== Political career ==
Joseph Amenowode is a member of the National Democratic Congress, he first stood for the 2004 Ghanaian general election, winning with a majority of 17,720 (75.6%) and taking his seat in the Fourth parliament of the Fourth Republic of Ghana. He won by obtaining 89% of the cast votes (18,340 out of 20,605 valid votes cast). He retained his seat in the 2008 election. In 2009, he was appointed the Volta Regional Minister by the President of Ghana John Atta Mills, a position he held until he was dropped in a cabinet reshuffle by President Mills in early 2012.

== Personal life ==
He is a Christian member of the Global Evangelical Church. He is married with seven children.
