= Kwabre West (Ghana parliament constituency) =

Constituency in Ghana

- constituency for the Parliament of Ghana
- District: Kwabre District
- Region: Ashanti Region of Ghana

Current constituency
- Created: 2004
- Party: New Patriotic Party
- MP: Emmanuel Owusu-Ansah

Kwabre West is one of the constituencies represented in the Parliament of Ghana. It elects one Member of Parliament (MP) by the first past the post system of election. Kwabre West is located in the Kwabre district of the Ashanti Region of Ghana.

This seat was created prior to the Ghanaian parliamentary election in 2004.

== Boundaries ==
The seat is located within the Kwabre District of the Ashanti Region of Ghana.

== History ==
The constituency was first created in 2004 by the Electoral Commission of Ghana along with 29 other new constituencies, increasing the number from 200 to 230.

== Members of Parliament ==
Election	Member	Party
2004	Constituency created	
2004	Emmanuel Owusu-Ansah	New Patriotic Party

== Elections ==
2004 Ghanaian parliamentary election:Kwabre West Source:Ghana Home Page
Party	Candidate	Votes	%	±%
New Patriotic Party	Emmanuel Owusu-Ansah	26,700	84.1	N/A
National Democratic Congress	Gabriel Amakye	5,046	15.9	N/A
Majority		21,654	68.2	N/A

== See also ==
- List of Ghana Parliament constituencies
