= Berekum (Ghana parliament constituency) =

Ghana parliament constituency

- constituency for the Parliament of Ghana
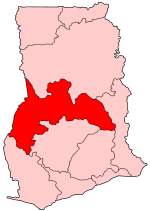
- District: Berekum District
- Region: Brong Ahafo Region of Ghana

Current constituency
- Party: New Patriotic Party
- MP: Kwaku Agyenim-Boateng

Berekum is one of the constituencies represented in the Parliament of Ghana. It elects one Member of Parliament (MP) by the first past the post system of election. Berekum is located in the Berekum district of the Brong Ahafo Region of Ghana. Brekum has been divided into Brekum East Municipal and Brekum West District.

== Boundaries ==
The seat is located within the Berekum District of the Brong Ahafo Region of Ghana.

== Members of Parliament ==
Election	Member	Party
1992	J.H. Owusu Acheampong	National Democratic Congress
2000	Nkrabeah Effah Dartey	New Patriotic Party
2008	Kwaku Agyenim-Boateng	New Patriotic Party

== Elections ==
2004 Ghanaian parliamentary election:Berekum Source:Ghana Home Page
Party	Candidate	Votes	%	±%
New Patriotic Party	Nkrabeah Effah Dartey	28,561	60.0	−4.2
National Democratic Congress	Stephen Oppong	19,047	40.0	+5.9
Majority		9,514	20.0	−10.1

2000 Ghanaian parliamentary election:Berekum Source:Adam Carr's Election Archives
Party	Candidate	Votes	%	±%
New Patriotic Party	Nkrabeah Effah Dartey	23,288	64.2	
National Democratic Congress	J.H. Owusu Acheampong	12,393	34.1	
Convention People's Party	Kofi Kumi Atta-Frimpong	262	0.7	
National Reform Party	Dickson Kofi Nuako	251	0.7	
United Ghana Movement	Andrews Hinneh	64	0.3	
Majority		10,895	30.1	
Turnout		36,288	59.1	

1996 Ghanaian parliamentary election:Berekum Source:
Party	Candidate	Votes	%	±%
National Democratic Congress	J.H. Owusu Acheampong			

1992 Ghanaian parliamentary election:Berekum Source:
Party	Candidate	Votes	%	±%
National Democratic Congress	J.H. Owusu Acheampong			

== See also ==
- List of Ghana Parliament constituencies
