= Comfort Owusu =

Ghanaian politician

MP for Mfantsiman East
- In office 7 January 1993 – 6 January 2005
- President: John Agyekum Kufour

Personal details
- Born: Mfantseman East, Central Region Gold Coast (now Ghana)
- Party: National Democratic Congress
- Occupation: Politician
- Profession: Beautician

Comfort Owusu (born 28 April 1940) is a Ghanaian politician and a member of the Third Parliament of the Fourth Republic representing the Mfantsiman East Constituency in the Central Region of Ghana.

== Early life and education ==
Owusu was born in 1940 in the Mfantsiman East in the Central region of Ghana. She attended Morris School of Hairdressing & Culture where she obtained her Diploma degree in Culture & Beauty.

== Politics ==
Owusu is a member of the 1st, 2nd and 3rd parliament of the 4th republic of Ghana. Her political career started in 1992 when she became a member of parliament for the Mfantsiman constituency of the central region on the Ticket of the National Convention party. She contested again in the 1996 and 2000 Ghanaian General elections representing the Mfantsiman East Constituency and retained her seat on the ticket of the National Democratic Congress. She has won the seat of the Member of Parliament for the Mfanstiman East constituency three consecutive times. In 2000, she polled a total votes of 7,110 votes in the Ghanaian general elections.

== Career ==
Owusu is a Beautician and a Former member of Parliament for the Mfantsiman East Constituency in the Central Region of Ghana.

== Personal life ==
Owusu is a Christian.
