= Magnus Opare-Asamoah =

Ghanaian politician

MP for Aburi-Nsawam
- In office 7 January 2005 – 6 January 2009
- President: John Agyekum Kufour

Personal details
- Born: 26 November 1948 (age 77) Nsawam, Eastern Region Gold Coast (now Ghana)
- Party: New Patriotic Party
- Education: Kwame Nkrumah University of Science and Technology
- Occupation: Politician
- Profession: Engineer

Magnus Opare-Asamoah (born 26 November 1948) is a Ghanaian politician and a member of the fourth parliament of the fourth Republic of Ghana representing the Aburi-Nsawam constituency in the Eastern Region.

== Early life and education ==
Opare-Asamoah was born in Nsawam on 26 November 1948 in the Eastern Region of Ghana. He attended the Kwame Nkrumah University of Science and Technology and Obtained a Degree in Bachelor of Science after he studied civil engineering.

== Politics ==
Opare-Asamoah was first elected to parliament on the ticket of the New Patriotic Party during the December 2004 Ghanaian General elections. He polled 25,940 votes out of the 46,359 valid votes cast representing 56.00%. He was defeated by Mr Osei Bonsu Amoah during the Party's Parliamentary Primary in 2008.

== Career ==
Opare-Asamoah is an engineer. He also is the Deputy minister of Transportation and a member of the Fourth Parliament of the Fourth Republic representing the Aburi-Nsawam Constituency.

== Personal life ==
Opare-Asamoah is a Christian.
