= Charles Hodogbey =

Ghanaian politician

MP for North Tongu
- Incumbent
- Assumed office 7 January 2005
- President: John Agyekum Kuffour

Personal details
- Born: 21 July 1948 (age 78) Dofor-Adidome, Volta Region Ghana)
- Party: National Democratic Congress
- Children: 4
- Education: University of Chicago, United States
- Occupation: Politician
- Profession: ICT Specialist

Charles Hodogbey (born July 21, 1948) is an ICT Specialist and politician of the Republic of Ghana. He was the member of parliament that represented North Tongu (Ghana parliament constituency) Volta Region under the ticket of the National Democratic Congress in the 5th Parliament of the 4th Republic of Ghana.

== Early life and education ==
Charles Hodogbey was born in Dofor-Adidome in the Volta Region of Ghana. He was educated in the U.S. He holds a master's degree in management information systems from the De Paul University of Chicago in 1985.

== Personal life ==
He is married (with four children) and is a Christian (Evangelical Presbyterian).

== Career ==
He worked with the Department of Public Health, City of Chicago, U.S., as a principal programmer/analyst before he became a member of parliament for North Tongu.

== Politics ==
Charles Hodogbey is a member of the National Democratic Congress. He was a member of Ghana's parliament for North Tongu Constituency from 2009 up till 2013. He won with 22,876 votes out of the 29,116 valid votes cast = 78.6%.
