= Kofi Karim Wumbei =

Ghanaian politician

Hon. Kobina Tahir Hammond

Member of Parliament for Wulensi Constituency
- In office 7 January 2005 – 6 January 2009
- President: John Kufuor

Personal details
- Born: 7 July 1955 (age 71)
- Party: New Patriotic Party
- Education: University of Cape Coast
- Profession: Teacher

Kofi Karim Wumbei (born 7 July 1955) is a Ghanaian politician and a teacher. He served as a member of parliament for the Wulensi Constituency in the Northern Region.

== Early life and education ==
Wumbei was born on 7 July 1955. He has a Master of Science in Education at the University of Cape Coast.

== Career ==
Wumbei is a teacher by profession.

== Politics ==
Wumbei is a member of the 4th parliament of the 4th republic on seat in the 2004 Ghanaian general election for the New Patriotic Party.

== Elections ==
Wumbei was elected as the member of parliament for the Wulensi constituency of the Northern Region of Ghana for the first time in the 2004 Ghanaian general elections. He won on the ticket of the New Patriotic Party. His constituency was a part of the 8 parliamentary seats out of 26 seats won by the New Patriotic Party in that election for the Northern Region. The New Patriotic Party won a majority total of 128 parliamentary seats out of 230 seats. He was elected with 10,476 votes out of 22,567 total valid votes cast equivalent to 46.4% of total valid votes cast. He was elected over Daniel Okpanul of the People's National Convention, Laliri George Maban of the National Democratic Congress, Alhaji Musah Ziblila Star Boy of the Convention People's Party, Dawuda Mumuni of the Democratic People's Party and Mohammed Iddrisu an independent candidate. These obtained 3.9%, 43.7%, 0.9%, 1.3% and 3.8% respectively of total valid votes cast.

== Personal life ==
Wumbei is a Muslim.
