= Kofi Krah Mensah =

Ghanaian politician

Hon. Kofi Krah Mensah

Member of Parliament for Amansie West Constituency
- In office 7 January 2005 – 6 January 2009
- President: John Kufuor

Personal details
- Born: 2 February 1942 (age 84)
- Party: New Patriotic Party
- Education: Ghana School of Law, University of Leeds

Kofi Krah Mensah is a Ghanaian politician and also a businessman. He served as a member of parliament for the Amansie West constituencies in the Ashanti Region.

== Personal life ==
Mensah was born on February 2, 1942. He holds a Master in Law degree at Ghana School of Law. He is also a product of the University of Leeds where he obtained a Master of Arts degree in Economic Development in UK.

Mensah is listed on the Ghana Parliamentary Register as a businessman and a Christian.

== Politics ==
Mensah was a member of the 4th Parliament of the 4th Republic of Ghana. He won the seat for the Amansie West constituency in 2004 Ghanaian parliamentary election. His constituency was a part of the 36 parliamentary seats out of 39 seats won by the New Patriotic Party in that election for the Ashanti Region. Mensah was elected with 84.2% of total valid votes cast.

Prior to the 2008 election, Mesah lost the primary for the New Patriotic Party to Grace Addo.
