= St. Peter's Mission Schools =

School in Ghana

St. Peter's Mission School is a day and boarding international school in Ghana. St. Peter's Mission School is an independent day and boarding school in Accra, Ghana providing an education from pre-K through senior high school. St Peters Mission School was founded in 1990 by Moses Adu Gyimah. There are two branches of SPMS, the St Peters and Archimedes Sites.

== Facilities in the School ==
There are about three ICT Labs and Libraries in St Peters Mission School. There is a playground for the lower primary students. There is also a basketball court, handball court and tennis ball court. The school has an Assembly Hall and there are two dormitories (Male and Female) for students who live far away from the school.
