= Moses Dani Baah =

Ghanaian politician

Hon. Moses Dani Baah

Member of Parliament for Sissala East Constituency
- In office 7 January 2005 – 6 January 2009
- President: John Kufuor
- Succeeded by: Alhassan Dubie Halutie

Member of Parliament for Sissala Constituency
- In office 7 January 2001 – 6 January 2005
- President: John Kufuor

Personal details
- Party: People's National Convention
- Education: Kwame Nkrumah University of Science and Technology
- Profession: Site Engineer

Moses Dani Baah is a Ghanaian politician and was the Member of Parliament for the Sissala East constituency in the Upper West Region of Ghana. He was a member of the People's National Convention.

== Early life and education ==
Baah was born in July, 1951. He attended the Kwame Nkrumah University of Science and Technology (KNUST). From KNUST he obtained a Diploma in Civil Engineering.

== Career ==
Baah is a Civil Engineer by profession.. He started his career with A Lang Limited and rose to the position of regional manager for the Upper East region before starting his own construction company, Danib Limited in 1986. This company managed the construction of several high profile projects such as the Zebilla District Hospital, the Ghana Registered Nurses Hostel, Catholic University College Classroom blocks, SSNIT Housing Units at Adenta, DVLA offices in Accra.

== Politics ==
Moses Dani Baah was a two time member of parliament from 2000 - 2008. He was first elected to parliament in 2000 as MP for the Sissala constituency and was again elected as the Member of parliament for the newly created Sissala East constituency, formerly Sissala constituency in the Upper West region of Ghana. He represented the constituency in the 4th parliament of the 4th republic of Ghana.

He Served as Deputy Minister of Health in the Kufuor Administration from 2000 - 2005 and as Deputy Minister for Presidential and Private Sector initiatives from 2005 - 2006.

He was elected Chairman of PNC in October 2020 after defeating Bernard Mornah in the contest for the Chairmanship position.

=== 2000 Elections ===
Baah was elected as the member of parliament for the constituency in the Upper West region of Ghana in the 2000 Ghanaian general elections. He therefore represented the constituency in the 4th parliament of the 4th republic of Ghana. He was elected with 16,009 votes out of the total votes cast.

This is equivalent to 55.40% of the total valid votes cast. He was elected over Amidu Sulemana of the National Democratic Congress Party, Lamini M. Dawudu of the New Patriotic Party and Issah Musah of the United Ghana Movement.

These obtained 12,046 votes, 632 votes and 219 votes respectively of the total valid votes cast. These were equivalent to 41.70%, 2.20% and 0.80% respectively of the total valid votes cast. Baah was elected on the ticket of the Peoples National Convention.

Baah was elected as the member of parliament for the Sissala East constituency in the 2004 Ghanaian general elections. He, therefore, represented the constituency in the 4th parliament of the 4th republic of Ghana from 7 January 2005 to 6 January 2009.

He was elected with 14,186 votes out of 19,129 total valid votes cast. He was elected over Alhassan Dubie Halutie of the National Democratic Congress. Baah was elected on the ticket of the People's National Convention.

His constituency was a part of the only two constituencies won by the People's National Convention in the Upper West region of Ghana in the 2004 Ghanaian General elections. The electorates in the Sissala East constituency voted in a 'skirt and blouse' manner in that elections as the presidential candidate who won for the same constituency was John Kuffour of the New Patriotic Party.

In all the party won just 4 parliamentary representation out of a total 230 seats in the 4th parliament of the 4th republic of Ghana.
