= Seidu Paakuna Adamu =

Ghanaian politician

Hon. Seidu Paakuna Adamu

Member of Parliament for Bibiani Constituency
- In office 7 January 2001 – 6 January 2005
- President: John Kufuor

Personal details
- Party: National Democratic Congress
- Occupation: Politician

Seidu Paakuna Adamu is a Ghanaian politician and was a member of the 2nd and 3rd parliament of the 4th republic of Ghana. He is a former member of Parliament for the Bibiani constituency in the Western Region a member of the National Democratic Congress political party in Ghana.

== Politics ==
Adamu was a member of the 3rd parliament of the 4th republic of Ghana. He is a member of the National Democratic Congress and a representative of the Bibiani constituency of the Western Region of Ghana. His political career began when he contested in the 1996 Ghanaian General elections and won on the ticket of the National Democratic Congress. He polled 24,437 votes out of the 37,712 valid votes cast representing 52.30% over his opponents Christopher Addae an NPP member and Moses Jasi-Addae an EGLE member who polled 13,275 votes and 0 vote respectively.

=== 2000 Elections ===
Adamu was elected as the member of parliament for the Bibiani constituency in the 2000 Ghanaian general elections. He won the elections on the ticket of the National Democratic Congress. His constituency was a part of the 9 parliamentary seats out of 19 seats won by the National Democratic Congress in that election for the Western Region. The National Democratic Congress won a minority total of 92 parliamentary seats out of 200 seats in the 3rd parliament of the 4th republic of Ghana. He was elected with 19,818 votes out of 38,378 total valid votes cast. This was equivalent to 53.7% of the total valid votes cast. He was elected over Christopher Addae of the New Patriotic Party, Anthony K. Gyasi of the Convention People's Party, Richard A. Donkor of the National Reformed Party and John Boakye Adae an independent candidate. These obtained 16,736 and 318 votes respectively with the last two candidates having no votes out of the total valid votes cast. These were equivalent to 45% and 0.9% respectively of total valid votes cast.

== See also ==
- List of MPs elected in the 2000 Ghanaian parliamentary election
