= Kiston Akomea Kissi =

Ghanaian politician

Hon. Kiston Akomea Kissi

Member of Parliament for Akwatia Constituency
- In office 7 January 2005 – 6 January 2009
- President: John Kufuor

Member of Parliament for Akwatia Constituency
- In office 7 January 2001 – 6 January 2005
- President: John Kufuor

Personal details
- Born: 4 July 1957 (age 68)
- Party: New Patriotic Party
- Profession: Farmer

Kiston Akomea Kissi (born 4 July 1957) is a Ghanaian politician and a member of the Fourth Parliament of the Fourth Republic representing the Akwatia Constituency in the Eastern Region of Ghana.

== Early life and education ==
Kissi was born on 4 July 1957, a few months after Ghana gained independence, in Akwatia in the Eastern Region of Ghana. He is a self-educated politician.

== Career ==
Kissi is a farmer.

== Politics ==
Kissi was first elected into Parliament on the ticket of the New Patriotic Party during the December 2000 Ghanaian General elections. He polled 13,805 votes out of the 28,229 valid votes cast, representing 48.90%. In the 2004 elections, he polled 19,386 votes out of the 37,135 valid votes cast, representing 52.20%. He served two terms as a Parliamentarian (2001–2009).

== Elections ==
Kissi was elected as the member of parliament for the Akwatia constituency of the Eastern Region of Ghana in the 2004 Ghanaian general elections. He won on the ticket of the New Patriotic Party. His constituency was a part of the 22 parliamentary seats out of 28 seats won by the New Patriotic Party in that election for the Eastern Region. The New Patriotic Party won a majority total of 128 parliamentary seats out of 230 seats. He was elected with 19,386 votes out of 37,135 total valid votes cast. This was equivalent to 52.2% of total valid votes cast. He was elected over Baba Jamal Mohammed Ahmed of the National Democratic Congress, Samuel Agyei of the Convention People's Party and Eric Totimeh Nomotey of the Every Ghanaian Living Everywhere party. These obtained 17,484, 185 and 80 votes respectively of total valid votes cast. These were equivalent to 47.1%, 0.5% and 0.2% respectively of total valid votes cast.

== Personal life ==
Kissi is a Christian.
