= Patrick Al-Hassan Adamah =

Ghanaian politician

Member of the Ghana Parliament for Sissala West Constituency

Personal details
- Born: 23 November 1948 (age 77)
- Party: New Patriotic Party

Patrick Al-Hassan Adamah (born 23 November 1948) is a Ghanaian politician and member of the Seventh Parliament of the Fourth Republic of Ghana representing the Sissala West Constituency in the Upper West Region on the ticket of the New Patriotic Party.

== Education ==
He earned an Associate degree from the University of London's Royal School of Mines and a BSC in English from Imperial College. From 1972 until 1988, Adamah worked for British Coal as a research mining engineer. From 1988 to 2007, he served as the regional manager of Kolon Limited, U.K. Africa.
