= Godfried Ako-Nai =

Ghanaian politician

MP for Dade-Kotopon
- In office 7 January 2001 – 6 January 2005
- President: John Agyekum Kufour

Personal details
- Born: 21 September 1954 (age 71) Dade Kotopon, Greater Accra Region Gold Coast (now Ghana)
- Party: New Patriotic Party
- Occupation: Politician
- Profession: Lawyer

Godfried Ako -Nai(born September 21, 1954) is a Ghanaian Politician and a member of the Third Parliament of the Fourth Republic representing the Dade-Kotopon Constituency in the Greater Accra Region of Ghana.

== Early life and education ==
Ako was born on 21 September 1954 in Dade-Kotopon in the Greater Accra Region of Ghana.

== Politics ==
Ako was first elected into Parliament on the Ticket of the New Patriotic Party during the December 2000 Ghanaian General Elections as a member of Parliament for the Dade-Kotopon Constituency in the Greater Accra Region of Ghana. He polled 32,637 votes out of the 61,824 valid votes cast representing 52.80%. He lost in the 2004 Parliamentary Primaries to Laryea Abednego.

== Career ==
Ako is a Lawyer and a Former Member of Parliament for the Dade-Kotopon Constituency in the Greater Accra region of Ghana from 2001 to 2005.
