= Peter Sarkodie =

Ghanaian politician (born 1961)

Hon. Peter Abum Sarkodie

Member of Parliament for Mampong Constituency
- In office 7 January 2005 – 6 January 2009
- President: John Kufuor

Personal details
- Party: New Patriotic Party
- Education: University of Cape Coast
- Occupation: Lecturer

Peter Abum Sarkodie is a Ghanaian politician of the Republic of Ghana. He was the Member of Parliament representing Mampong constituency of the Ashanti Region of Ghana in the 4th Parliament of the 4th Republic of Ghana. He is a member of the New Patriotic Party.

== Early life and education ==
Sarkodie was born on 12 December 1961. He is a product of the University of Cape Coast (UCC). He holds a Bachelor of Science degree in education from the university.

== Career ==
Sarkodie is lecturer.

== Political career ==
Sarkodie is a member of the New Patriotic Party. He became a member of parliament from January 2005 after emerging winner in the General Election in December 2004. He was elected as the member of parliament for the Mampong constituency in the fourth parliament of the fourth Republic of Ghana.

== Elections ==
Sarkodie was elected as the member of parliament for the Mampong constituency of the Ashanti Region of Ghana for the first time in the 2004 Ghanaian general elections. He won on the ticket of the New Patriotic Party. His constituency was a part of the 36 parliamentary seats out of 39 seats won by the New Patriotic Party in that election for the Ashanti Region. The New Patriotic Party won a majority total of 128 parliamentary seats out of 230 seats. He was elected with 28,997 votes out of 36,648 total valid votes cast. This was equivalent to 79.1% of total valid votes cast. He was elected over Mohammed Issahaku of the Peoples’ National Convention, Daniel Ohyeamang Appau of the National Democratic Congress, Kwaku Duah Agyemang of the Convention People's Party and Bashir Kassim of the Democratic People's Party. These obtained 226, 6,921, 374 and 130 votes respectively of total votes cast. These were equivalent to 0.6%, 18.9%, 1.0% and 0.4% respectively of total valid votes cast.

== Personal life ==
Sarkodie is a Christian.

== See also ==
- List of MPs elected in the 2004 Ghanaian parliamentary election
