= Bibiani-Anhwiaso-Bekwai (Ghana parliament constituency) =

Parliamentary constituency in Ghana

Bibiani/Anhwiaso/Bekwai
- constituency for the Parliament of Ghana
- District: Bibiani/Anhwiaso/Bekwai District
- Region: Western North Region of Ghana

Current constituency
- Party: New Patriotic Party
- MP: Christopher Addae

Christopher Addae is the member of parliament for the constituency. He was elected on the ticket of the New Patriotic Party (NPP) and won a majority of 2227 votes to become the MP. He was also the incumbent MP during the 2008 parliamentary elections of Ghana.

== See also ==
- List of Ghana Parliament constituencies
