= Kofi Amoatey =

Ghanaian politician

Magnus Kofi Amoatey (born 10 December 1948) is the MP-elect for the Yilo Krobo Constituency in the Eastern Region of Ghana. He will be a member of the sixth parliament of the fourth Republic of Ghana after the new parliament is sworn in on 7 January 2013 upon the dissolution of the fifth parliament at midnight on 6 January 2013. According to official results released by the Electoral Commission of Ghana, Amoatey won in all but 3 of the 124 polling stations of the Yilo Krobo constituency and polled a total of 26,584, representing 61.49% of valid votes cast.

== Personal life ==
Amoatey is a Christian of the Presbyterian denomination. He is married and has three children.

== Early life and education ==
Amoatey was born on 10 December 1948. He hails from Sra, a town in the Eastern Region of Ghana. He entered the University of Ghana and obtained his Bachelor of Art in Sociology in 1990. He also attended Ghana School of Law and obtained his bachelor's degree in law in 1995.

== Employment ==
- Director of Programmes, National Commission on Culture (retired)
- Junior partner, Yilo Chambers, Accra (Barristers and Solicitors)
- Lawyer
