= Binduri (Ghana parliament constituency) =

Ghana parliament constituency

- constituency for the Parliament of Ghana
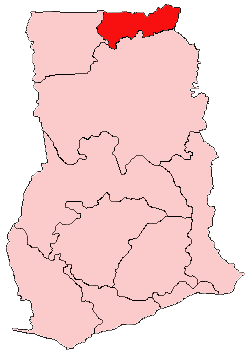
- District: Binduri
- Region: Upper East Region of Ghana

Current constituency
- Created: 2020
- Party: National Democratic Congress
- MP: Mahmoud Issifu

Binduri is a constituencies represented in the Parliament of Ghana. It elects one member of parliament (MP) by the first past the post system. Mahmoud Issifu is the member of parliament for the constituency. Binduri was part of in the Bawku Municipal District of the Upper East Region of Ghana but has since June 2012 become a full district.

== Boundaries ==
Binduri shares boundaries with Garu Tempane district to the east and south, Bawku municipality to the north and Bawku West district to the west in the Upper East region of Ghana.

== Members of parliament ==
Election	Member	Party
1992	Fortunate Atubiga	National Democratic Congress
2000	Achidago B. Akugri	National Democratic Congress
2004	Mark Anthony Awuni	National Democratic Congress
2008	Stephen Yakubu	New Patriotic Party
2012	Ben Azure Noah	National Democratic Congress

| 2016 | ROBERT KUGANAB-LEM | National Democratic Congress |}

== Elections ==
2008 Ghanaian parliamentary election: Binduri Source:Ghana Home Page
Party	Candidate	Votes	%	±%
New Patriotic Party	Stephen Yakubu	9,103	50.8	
National Democratic Congress	Mark Anthony Awini	8,357	46.6	
People's National Convention	Azure Cyrian Ayendago	292	1.6	
Convention People's Party	Barichie T. Yakubu	103	0.6	
Democratic Freedom Party	Elias Ayeebo	75	0.4	
Democratic People's Party	Ndezure Peter	0	0.0	
Majority				—
Turnout				—

== See also ==
- List of Ghana Parliament constituencies
