= Daniel Tekpertey =

Ghanaian politician

Hon. Daniel Tekpertey

Member of Parliament for Yilo Krobo Constituency
- In office 7 January 1997 – 6 January 2001
- President: Jerry John Rawlings

Member of Parliament for Yilo Krobo Constituency
- In office 7 January 2001 – 6 January 2005
- President: John Kufuor

Personal details
- Party: National Democratic Congress
- Profession: Politician

Daniel Tekpertey is a Ghanaian politician representing the National Democratic Congress as a member of the 3rd parliament of the 4th republic of Ghana for the Yilo Krobo in the Eastern Region of Ghana.

== Early life, education and politics ==
Tekpertey was born at Yilo Krobo in the Eastern Region of Ghana. He was on seat during the 1996 Ghanaian general election representing the Yilo Krobo Constituency. He held the seat till 2004 during which he lost the seat to Raymond Tawiah of National Democratic Congress.

== Elections ==
Daniel won the Yilo Krobo Constituency seat in the 2000 Ghanaian General Elections. He polled a total of 13,960 votes which is equivalent to 49.10% of the total votes cast. The total votes cast was 28,456. Mr. Tekpertey won on the ticket of the National Democratic Congress (NDC). He contested with five other political parties. Christian Kofi Tettey of the New Patriotic Party (NPP) had a total votes count of 9,264 which is equivalent to 32.60%.

Jonas Tetteh Numo of the National Reform Party (NRP) has 12.00% which is comparable to 3,425 votes. The Convention People's Party (CPP) had 1,112 votes which is equivalent to 3.90% of the total votes. Two other political parties contested for this seat. The parties are the People's National Convention (PNC) and the United Ghana Movement (UGM).
