= Amansie West (Ghana parliament constituency) =

Ghana parliament constituency

- constituency for the Parliament of Ghana
- District: Amansie West District
- Region: Ashanti Region of Ghana

Current constituency
- Party: New Patriotic Party
- MP: Grace Addo

Amansie West is one of the constituencies represented in the Parliament of Ghana. It elects one Member of Parliament (MP) by the first past the post system of election. Amansie West is located in the Amansie West district of the Ashanti Region of Ghana.

== Boundaries ==
The seat is located within the Amansie West District of the Ashanti Region of Ghana.

== Members of Parliament ==
Election	Member	Party
1992	Kofi Amankwaa Peasah	National Democratic Congress
1996	Anthony Boakye-Yiadom	New Patriotic Party
2000	Stephen Cobbinah Bour Karikari	New Patriotic Party
2004	Kofi Krah Mensah	New Patriotic Party
2008	Grace Addo	New Patriotic Party

== Elections ==
2008 Ghanaian parliamentary election: Ahafo Ano South Source: Ghana Home Page
Party	Candidate	Votes	%	±%
New Patriotic Party	Grace Addo	35,274	73.1	
Independent	Stephen Cobbina Bour Karikari	5,818	12.1	
National Democratic Congress	Kwaku Aninkora-Sie	6,787	14.1	
People's National Convention	Mary Agyeiwaa	378	0.8	
Convention People's Party	Acheampong J. Martin	327	0.8	
Independent	Yaw Agyemang	236	0.6	
Majority		29,456	61.0	

== See also ==
- List of Ghana Parliament constituencies
