= 2004 Ghanaian general election =

- 7 December 2004
- Presidential election
- Turnout: 85.12%
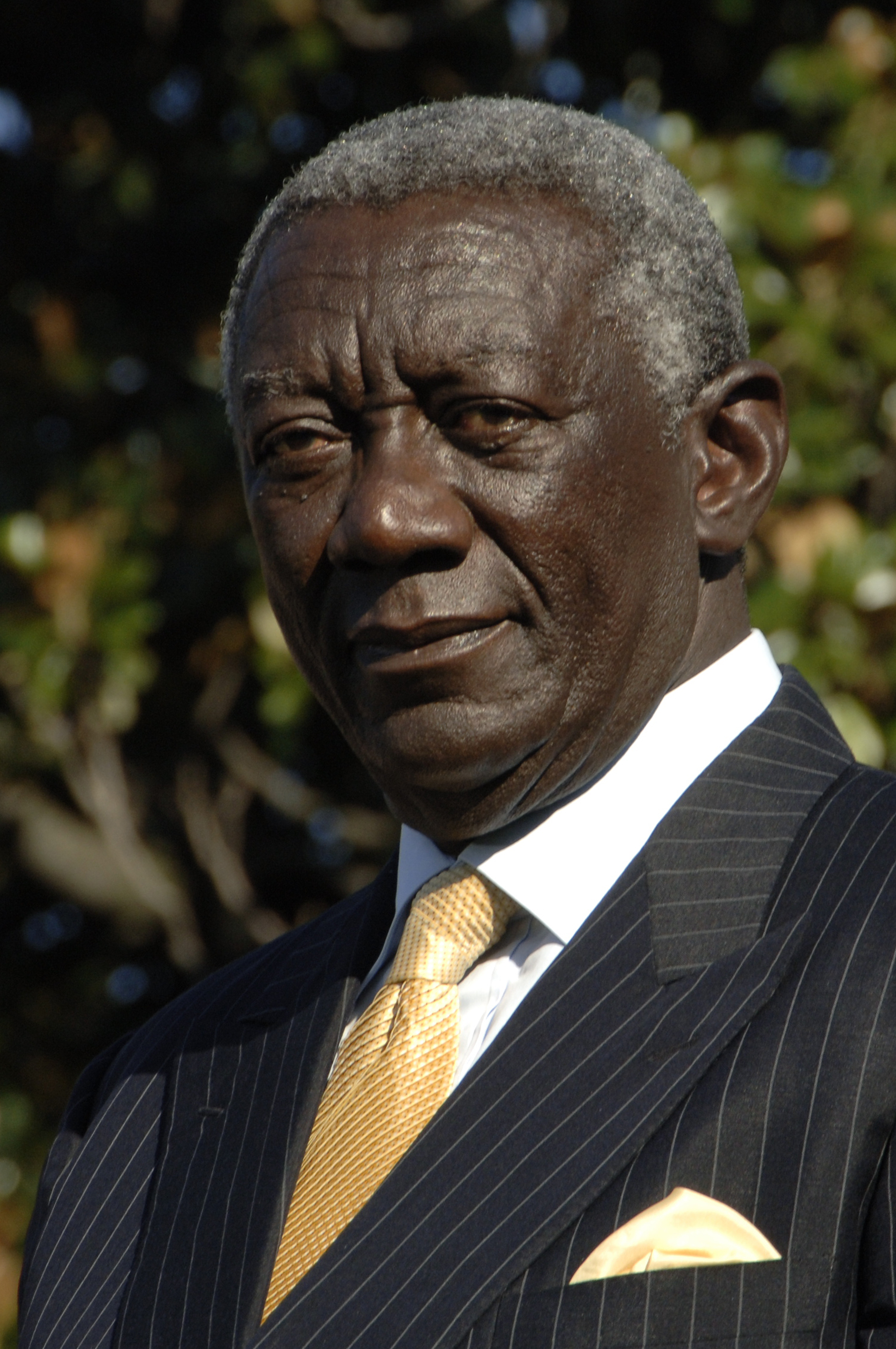

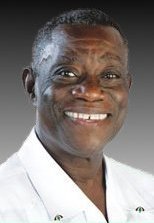
Nominee	John Kufuor	John Atta Mills
Party	NPP	NDC
Running mate	Aliu Mahama	Muhammad Mumuni
Popular vote	4,524,074	3,850,368
Percentage	52.45%	44.64%
President before election
John Kufuor
NPP
Elected President
John Kufuor
NPP

General elections were held in Ghana on 7 December 2004. The presidential elections resulted in a victory for incumbent John Kufuor of the New Patriotic Party (NPP), who defeated John Atta-Mills of the National Democratic Congress with 52 percent of the vote in the first round, enough to win without the need for a runoff. The parliamentary elections saw the NPP win 128 seats in the expanded 230-seat Parliament, an outright majority.

== Presidential election ==
There were four candidates:

- George Aggudey (Convention People's Party)
- John Kufuor (New Patriotic Party) - incumbent
- John Atta Mills (National Democratic Congress)
- Edward Mahama (Grand Coalition, an alliance of the People's National Convention, Every Ghanaian Living Everywhere, and Great Consolidated Popular Party)

== Results ==
=== President ===
Candidate	Running mate	Party	Votes	%
John Kufuor	Aliu Mahama	New Patriotic Party	4,524,074	52.45
John Atta Mills	Muhammad Mumuni	National Democratic Congress	3,850,368	44.64
Edward Mahama	Danny Ofori Atta	Grand Coalition	165,375	1.92
George Aggudey	Bright Kwame Ameyaw	Convention People's Party	85,968	1.00
Total			8,625,785	100.00
Valid votes			8,625,785	97.87
Invalid/blank votes			188,123	2.13
Total votes			8,813,908	100.00
Registered voters/turnout			10,354,970	85.12
Source: Electoral Commission of Ghana

=== Parliament ===
Party	Votes	%	Seats	+/–
New Patriotic Party	4,212,844	49.04	128	+28
National Democratic Congress	3,505,074	40.80	94	+2
Convention People's Party	247,753	2.88	3	+2
People's National Convention	183,134	2.13	4	+1
Every Ghanaian Living Everywhere	16,097	0.19	0	0
National Reform Party	11,364	0.13	0	0
Democratic People's Party	9,955	0.12	0	New
Great Consolidated Popular Party	4,690	0.05	0	New
Independents	398,981	4.64	1	–3
Total	8,589,892	100.00	230	+30
Valid votes	8,589,892	98.38		
Invalid/blank votes	141,177	1.62		
Total votes	8,731,069	100.00		
Registered voters/turnout	10,381,152	84.11		
Source: Electoral Commission of Ghana

== See also ==
- List of MPs elected in the 2004 Ghanaian parliamentary election
