= House of Ghartey =

Fante royal family in Ghana

- Parent house: Otuano Royal House
- Country: Gold Coast, Ghana; Fante Confederation; Effutu state (Winneba, formerly Simpa)
- Founded: c. 1300 (traditional)
- Founder: Kwamena Gyarteh Ayirebi-Gyan (traditional)
- Current head: Neenyi Ghartey VII (since 1996)
- Titles: Effutu Oma Odefe (Paramount Chief of Effutu); King of Winneba; King-President of the Fante Confederation
- Traditions: Methodism; Effutu stool rites and the Aboakyer festival
- Estates: Otuano stool house, Winneba

The House of Ghartey, also known as the Ghartey dynasty or Ghartey family (historically spelled Gyateh or Gyarteh), is a Ghanaian royal house and the ruling line of the Otuano Royal House of Winneba (Simpa), capital of the Effutu state in the Central Region. Its heads reign as Effutu Oma Odefe (paramount chief) under the stool name Ghartey. The present holder, Neenyi Ghartey VII, has reigned since 1996. In the 19th century the family led the Fante Confederation, one of the earliest African attempts to build a modern state on a written constitution, and its head became one of the leading African allies of the British on the Gold Coast. Twentieth- and twenty-first-century members include a chief executive of the Ghana Broadcasting Corporation, an Attorney-General of Ghana, and the chief executive of Duke Energy's Carolinas utility in the United States; by marriage, the family also includes the first woman to lead the Ghana Bar Association.

The family's most historically prominent member, King Ghartey IV, Robert Johnson Ghartey (born Kwamena Akyempong; c. 1820 – 30 July 1897), was a former ship's cooper who taught himself to read and built the trading house Ghartey Brothers into one of the best-known African firms on the coast. In 1868 he was elected the first King-President of the Fante Confederation, formed by the Fante and allied states at Mankessim after the Anglo-Dutch exchange of forts. He presided over its court, managed its treasury and paid part of its costs from his own firm, and the Fante came to call him the "Governor of the Gold Coast". The Confederation's constitution of 1871 provided for an elected executive, roads, schools for both boys and girls, and economic development; the education scholar Christel Adick describes it as a unique early African attempt to construct a modern nation-state.

From 1872 Ghartey reigned as King Ghartey IV of Winneba. He sided with Britain in the Anglo-Asante wars of 1873–74 and 1895–96, and his 1864 Guide to Coomassie, the first measured account of the route from the coast to the Asante capital, was used by Sir Garnet Wolseley's expedition to Kumasi. Queen Victoria awarded him a silver medal in 1897. He nonetheless opposed the transfer of Effutu land to the British Crown and resisted officials whose measures he considered harmful to Africans. He is also credited with introducing the kaba blouse, founding a temperance society at Anomabu, and shipping the first palm kernels exported from the Gold Coast.

His son, the Methodist minister Samuel Quamina Gyatekuma Ghartey (Ghartey V, enstooled 1946), had taught the future Asantehene Prempeh II and the future Prime Minister Kofi Abrefa Busia; later holders of the stool were the International Labour Organization engineer Kweku Atta Ghartey (Ghartey VI) and Daniel Kobina Bortse Ghartey (Ghartey VII), Chancellor of the University of Education, Winneba since 2023. The family's right to the stool has been contested by rival houses in the courts since the 1970s.

David Ghartey-Tagoe was the first person to read the news on Ghana Television (1965) and later headed the Ghana Broadcasting Corporation. His son, Kodwo Ghartey-Tagoe, became chief executive of Duke Energy Carolinas, part of one of the largest energy companies in the United States, in 2025. Joe Ghartey, a principal elder of the Otuano royal family, has served as Attorney-General, Second Deputy Speaker of the Parliament of Ghana and Minister for Railway Development. His wife, Efua Ghartey, became the first female President of the Ghana Bar Association in 2024. The family also includes the Ghanaian ambassador Peter Abbam (died 2024) and, more distantly, his cousin Alex Quaison-Sackey, the first African President of the United Nations General Assembly.

== Name ==
Ghartey is an anglicised spelling of Gyateh or Gyarteh, the principal name of the Otuano family. Other Otuano family names include Gyan, Gyansah, Bondze, Bortse, Donkoh, Bonney and Ayirebi.

The modern spelling dates from the career of Kwamena Akyempong, later Ghartey IV. While he worked for the Dutch trading firm of Stooves Brothers, its agent, Mynheer Stooves, gave him the name Robert Johnson Ghartey, the surname being an anglicised form of his father's name, Gyateh. The historian Raymond Dumett describes Ghartey as a corruption of Gyateh.

The name survives in compound family names such as Ghartey-Tagoe and Akyeampong-Ghartey (the latter recalling Ghartey IV's birth name, Akyempong). Anthony Ephirim-Donkor's study of the Effutu kingship includes chapters titled "Building the Lion's Kingdom" and "The Lion King".

== Origins and traditions ==
=== Founding of Simpa ===
According to Effutu oral tradition, the Guan ancestors of the Effutu (the Awutu-abe) migrated south from the region of Timbuktu, camped at Takyiman, and founded a settlement called Efutu near present-day Jukwaa, north of Cape Coast. Their leader, Kwamena Gyarteh Ayirebi-Gyan, is remembered as a warrior and the first priest-king. He kept the community's deities, including the chief deity Otu, and the ancestral black stool. Tradition holds that he vanished into the ground, and that his people shaped two clay cannon (tubu) from the earth at that spot and carried them on their travels.

Leadership passed to his eldest son, Gyarteh Sisi, while another son, Prince Edwey, remained at Dwomma, the place Europeans later called Mumford. A search party under Osimpam Bondze-abe found a salt lagoon and a freshwater river, the Ayensu, and landed at a rocky point called Penkye. The settlement that grew there took its founder's name, Simpa, and Europeans later called the bay and town Winneba. The anthropologist Eva Meyerowitz dated the founding of the town to about 1300.

=== Otuano and Penkye Otu ===
The deity Otu, first left at Dwomma, was later moved to Penkye and became known as Penkye Otu. The compound of Osimpam Bondze-abe, where the deity was housed, became known as Otuano, and its people as the Otuano-abe. The royal house takes its name from this compound. Descendants of Gyarteh Sisi still travel to Dwomma each year to collect red clay used to consecrate Otu before the Akomase and Aboakyer festivals. One of the two clay cannon was planted at the shrine; the other, called Akwa, was used for casting lots after the annual sacrifice.

The Otuano royal family takes part in the rites of the Aboakyer festival, an annual deer hunt by Winneba's two Asafo companies, the Tuafo (No. 1) and Dentsefo (No. 2), held in honour of Penkye Otu. Local tradition holds that the deity once required a royal sacrifice, which was abandoned for fear that it would wipe out the royal line; a wild cat captured alive was substituted, and after many hunters died in the attempt, a mature bushbuck. Ghartey VII has welcomed plans by the Ghana Tourism Authority to protect the sacred forest where the deer are hunted. Control of the festival's closing rituals has been contested during disputes over the stool.

=== Patrilineal succession ===
Although Winneba lies within the Fante-speaking coast and its people share much of Fante culture, the Effutu are Guan, not Fante. Like other Guan communities, they trace royal descent through the father, in contrast to the matrilineal system of their Akan neighbours such as the Fante. Ephirim-Donkor's The Making of an African King examines the conflict between patrilineal and matrilineal claims to the Winneba stool. He describes it as a case of the matrilineal political system of the Akan displacing the long-established patrilineal descent of the Guan people of Simpa. When Ghartey V was installed in 1946, his supporters described their aim in part as restoring the patrilineal line of succession.

== Early rulers ==
Some accounts name Nana Kwasi Gyan Ghartey I as an early Effutu king said to have reigned from 1666 to 1712. Published sources say little about Ghartey II.

Gyateh Kumah III was Odefe (king) of Winneba during the 1820s. He married Obaapanyin Ekua Kaadze, a princess of Senya Beraku, and was the father of Ghartey IV.

The stool did not pass continuously through the Ghartey line. Ghartey IV succeeded King Henry Acquah I (known as Kwesi Eguasi) in 1872, and after his death in 1897 no king bearing the Ghartey stool name reigned again until 1946.

=== Winneba and the British before 1872 ===
Relations between Winneba and the British were violent in the early 19th century. On 6 February 1812 Henry Meredith, commandant of the English fort at Winneba, was seized and killed by townspeople after a dispute over gold placed in the fort for safekeeping. A British force under Commodore Irby destroyed the fort and burned the town in July 1812, and the Effutu were made to pay an indemnity. Winneba has had no European fort since.

== Robert Johnson Ghartey (Ghartey IV) ==
=== Early life ===
Kwamena Akyempong was born in Winneba in about 1820, the son of Gyateh Kumah III and Ekua Kaadze. He had no formal schooling. As a young man he went to sea as a cooper on English, Portuguese and Dutch vessels along the West African coast, and left seafaring after one of his masters was murdered at Apam. He then worked as a cooper at the Stooves Brothers factory at Apam, where Mynheer Stooves lent him books and he taught himself to read and write English. The firm later moved him to Elmina and then to Shama, where it made soap and distilled rum near the Pra River. Contemporaries recorded that he spoke Fante, Effutu, Ga, English and Dutch, with some Portuguese.

=== Ghartey Brothers ===
After about fourteen years with Stooves Brothers, Ghartey opened his own business at Anomabu under the name Ghartey Brothers. When the last of the Stooves died, he bought the Dutch firm's business, which gave him the Apam establishment and a network of thirteen branch trading posts (factories) along the coast. Dumett ranks Ghartey Brothers, with the Sarbah firm of Cape Coast, among the best-known African mercantile houses of the Gold Coast in the second half of the 19th century.

The firm's wealth came chiefly from exporting palm oil from the Effutu, Fante, Agona and Gomoa states, and from gold dust and ivory traded from Asante. Ghartey is said to have been the first to ship palm kernels from the Gold Coast, using his branches at Achowa (Ajua) and Sekondi, and he experimented with machine crushing of kernels. In the late 1870s he joined a mechanised gold-mining venture in Wassa, and in the 1880s he helped open the forests of Assin and Denkyira to wild rubber tapping by African traders. He also tried to build a timber industry around Winneba: he cleared the Ayensu River at his own expense so that logs could be floated down to the coast, and in 1893, as king, he shipped the first consignment of mahogany logs from Winneba on the SS Tenerife through the merchant J. J. Fischer. In 1873 the British firm F. & A. Swanzy sent him a letter and gift in recognition of his commercial work.

Dumett, who interviewed Ghartey's son Ghartey V, presents the firm as an example of African innovation and risk-taking that set standards for its competitors.

=== Methodism, temperance and the kaba ===
Ghartey was a Wesleyan Methodist and read prayers at the Wesleyan chapel in Winneba. In 1861 he travelled to England on business with the Fante merchant F. C. Grant. During the visit he went to the grave of his son, Johannes G. Ghartey, who had been a pupil at Queen's College, Taunton.

In England he came into contact with the temperance movement at Sparkbrook, Birmingham, and on his return he founded a branch of the Temperance Society at Anomabu in 1861, with the support of the missionaries T. B. Freeman, J. A. Solomon and J. Fynn. For its members he dug a well at Anomabu at a cost of £150; it remained the town's only source of clean drinking water until the 1950s. He also formed a "Band of Hope" section of girls from the society and his household, who sang at church services and funerals.

From the same journey he introduced the kabasrotu, a shoulder-covering blouse modelled on English dress. His maidservants wore it first, followed by the girls of his temperance society; the style then spread through his district and gradually across the country. The garment is known today as the kaba.

According to Milestone Documents, Ghartey and Grant were respected members of the Methodist church, receiving instruction for the ministry, when the Confederation was formed.

=== Journey to Kumasi ===
In 1862 Ghartey accompanied William West, superintendent of the Wesleyan mission, and Prince John Owusu Ansa on a mission tour to Kumasi during the reign of Kwaku Dua I. He timed the march with his pocket watch and calculated the distance from the coast to Kumasi as about 120 miles (190 km). He published the results in 1864 as A Guide to Coomassie, which the Effutu stool's history describes as the first travel book on Asante. The British used it during Garnet Wolseley's expedition to Kumasi in the war of 1873–74 (the "Sagrenti War").

=== Fante Confederation ===
By 1867 Ghartey was a leading figure at Anomabu. King Kofi Afedzie of Anomabu appointed him treasurer and later magistrate of the town court.

The Anglo-Dutch exchange of forts, which transferred several Fante coastal towns to Dutch control without local consultation, is usually seen as the immediate cause of the movement. In response, Fante kings and educated merchants met at Mankessim and formed the Fante Confederation. The Effutu state's history names him, with George Blankson, Prince Brew of Dunkwa, the Rev. Joseph D. Hayford and James F. Amissah, among the founders, with Blankson as secretary. Other merchant members included John Sarbah, F. C. Grant, Jacob W. Sey, J. F. Amissah and W. F. Hutchison.

Ghartey was chosen as the Confederation's first King-President and served as Chief Magistrate of the Confederate court at Mankessim under the working constitution of 1868. Sources differ on his dates in office: the Encyclopaedia Africana presents him as president of the Confederation over its lifetime (1868–73), while chronologies of Fante rulers place his tenure from 1869 to 18 November 1871. He administered justice and finance from Mankessim and at times borrowed from his own firm to meet public expenses. Because of the breadth of his powers, and because a British withdrawal from the coast was then expected, the Fante came to call him the "Governor of the Gold Coast".

The Confederation raised an army of about 15,000 men, blocked a Dutch attempt to occupy the fort at Komenda in 1868, and besieged Elmina, but the campaign stalled and trade across Fante country collapsed. The Ghartey family's private funding could not cover the costs for long. Ghartey also faced criticism from within: some of the educated men behind the movement resented his power and accused him of financial irregularities, and the London-based African Times carried attacks on him. Under the revised constitution adopted in November 1871, the office of King-President passed jointly to the kings of Mankessim and Abura, and King Edu of Mankessim later held it alone.

The acting British administrator, Charles Spencer Salmon, treated the Confederation's leaders as conspirators and had several arrested in late 1871; they were released after pressure from the senior British administration in Sierra Leone. John Pope Hennessy, the administrator-in-chief of the West African Settlements, criticised Salmon's action in a despatch of 29 October 1872, but the movement had already broken down, and the Confederation had ceased to function by 1873. Ghartey's correspondence from this period, the Ghartey Papers, is held by the National Archives of Ghana in Accra and is one of the main African sources on the Confederation.

=== King of Winneba (1872–1897) ===
Ghartey was installed as King of Winneba in 1872 on the death of Henry Acquah I and took the stool name Ghartey IV. As king he invited European merchants and missions to establish themselves in Winneba, including F. & A. Swanzy, J. J. Fischer and the Basel Mission.

His reign included serious unrest in the town. In 1880, when the people of Winneba resisted British attempts to suppress customs they regarded as ancient, Ghartey supported the British authorities. In 1884–85 violent clashes between the Tuafo and Dentsefo Asafo companies led to the arrest of a number of Asafo men, who were executed in Accra on 5 February 1885. Ghartey petitioned the colonial government for clemency without success.

=== Relations with the British ===
Ghartey professed loyalty to Queen Victoria and assisted the British in the war of 1873–74 and again in 1895–96, when British forces occupied Kumasi. For his services in the 1895–96 Ashanti expedition he received a silver medal from the Queen, presented at Winneba on 12 June 1897 by the district commissioner, Dr Adrian L. Breen. When Governor Sir W. Brandford Griffith visited Winneba in July 1893, Ghartey arranged for him to preach in the Wesleyan chapel and acted as interpreter. On 31 October 1896 the Gold Coast Independent reprinted an interview with the British merchant W. A. Yates, who had traded with him, describing the king as one of the most intelligent and respected men of Winneba and as "a humanitarian, a diplomat, scholar and a gentleman".

Ghartey consistently opposed the transfer of his people's lands to the British Crown, and he resisted measures by local British officials that he considered harmful to Africans. Agbodeka notes that as an independent businessman he did not depend on government employment and could afford to disagree with officials. He explains Ghartey's apparent contradictions, such as backing British action against Winneba's townspeople in 1880, as a recognition of British imperial power and a wish to keep the peace needed for trade.

=== Death ===
Ghartey's health declined in July 1897, during the agitation against the colonial Lands Bill. On 27 and 28 July he wrote farewell letters to Governor Sir William Maxwell, to J. P. Brown of the Aborigines' Rights Protection Society, and to the ministers J. A. Solomon and A. W. Parker. In his last letter he asked the government to recognise and support a successor from among his children. Maxwell visited him on 28 July and promised to meet his requests.

He died on the morning of 30 July 1897. He lay in state for three days, attended by the Governor's son, colonial officials and the chiefs and elders of Winneba, while both Asafo companies fired musketry in his honour. He was buried in the royal mausoleum at Winneba.

== Twentieth century ==
=== Ghartey V (1946–1977) ===
Samuel Quamina Gyatekuma Ghartey (8 June 1889 – 1977) was the last son of Ghartey IV and Sarah Efuwa Betse Ghartey. He was baptised by the Rev. Jacob Anaman at Winneba in October 1889. Orphaned at about eight, he was raised by his uncle, the Rev. Markin. He attended the Wesleyan Mission School in Cape Coast and trained for the ministry at Richmond College, the forerunner of Mfantsipim School. As a young teacher at mission schools in Asante his pupils included the future Asantehene Prempeh II and the future Prime Minister Kofi Abrefa Busia.

He was ordained a Methodist minister on 24 January 1914 and served for over thirty years in circuits including Axim, Techiman, Dunkwa-on-Offin, Tarkwa, Agona Nyakrom and Elmina, building schools and opening new congregations. He also served as chaplain to the Joint Provincial Council of Chiefs.

In August 1946 a party from Winneba took him, against his wishes, to occupy his father's stool, and he was enstooled as Oma Odefe on 12 October 1946 after the elders accepted his conditions in writing. The Methodist Church released him from the ministry to serve the state. During his reign he secured the release of 45 people jailed after the 1941 Winneba riots, oversaw the building of bridges and public sanitation, and served on the governing board of the Specialist Training College in Winneba. Institutions founded or expanded in Winneba during his reign included Winneba Secondary School, the Kwame Nkrumah Ideological Institute (later the Advanced Teacher Training College) and the National Academy of Music. The Specialist Training College, the Advanced Teacher Training College and the National Academy of Music were later merged with other colleges to form the University of Education, Winneba in 1992.

He abdicated on 30 April 1952, saying his training and outlook did not suit the Effutu people, but was brought back and re-enstooled in 1953. In 1971 a faction declared him destooled in his absence, alleging that he favoured matrilineal inheritance and had failed to perform traditional rites. A dispute of about seven years followed, and on 19 April 1977, while the case was before the National House of Chiefs, the Ministry of Local Government withdrew recognition from him. He later submitted an instrument of abdication to the kingmakers. He died in 1977 aged 89, the oldest Odefe recorded in Effutu history; the stool's own account gives his death as both 2 September and 8 October 1977.

=== Ghartey VI (1993–1994) ===
Kweku Atta Ghartey (22 April 1920 – 8 February 1994) was the son of Opanyin Kojo Ghartey and Obaapanyin Ekua Ghanney of Winneba. He was educated at Winneba Methodist School and Mfantsipim School, took a degree in civil engineering in the United States in 1951, and later earned an MSc in civil engineering at the University of Birmingham.

After service in the Gold Coast civil service he was seconded in 1962 to the International Labour Organization in Geneva as an engineering management adviser, later working at its regional office in Addis Ababa and, from 1969 to 1979, as West African area officer in Lagos. He helped establish Ghana's Management Development and Productivity Institute and its National Vocational Institutes. He retired from the ILO in 1980.

He was enstooled as Effutu Oma Odefe on 11 December 1993 but fell ill soon afterwards and died on 8 February 1994, the shortest reign of any Otuano ruler.

=== Ghartey VII (from 1996) ===
Daniel Kobina Bortse Ghartey was born in Winneba on 3 April 1956 to Dolphin Kobina Ghartey and Ekua Esaaba; some sources give 1957. He was educated at Accra Academy and Winneba Secondary School and graduated in agriculture (animal science) from the University of Ghana in 1980. He later studied poultry nutrition in India on a Commonwealth scholarship (1988), farm management at the Ruppin Institute in Israel (1989), and development studies at the University of Cape Coast (MPhil, 2012). Before his accession he taught science and mathematics at Winneba Secondary School, Adisadel College and Wesley Girls' High School, and worked for the Ministry of Agriculture as a district officer at Tarkwa and Half Assini.

The elders and kingmakers of the Otuano Royal Stool House enstooled him on 20 January 1996 as the 16th king on the Otuano black stool, succeeding his uncle, Ghartey VI. He has been president of the Effutu Traditional Council, a member of the Central Regional House of Chiefs, and the Central Region's representative in the National House of Chiefs from 2004 to 2008. He served two terms on the governing council of the University of Education, Winneba (2017–2021) and was appointed its Chancellor in 2023.

Through the Effutu Youth Development Association he helped raise funds for the Winneba library, and he obtained support from the UNDP, UNOPS and a Norwegian fund for a fish-handling study whose 2000 report became the template for Winneba's safe landing beach. He also established sister-city links with Birmingham and Charlottesville in the United States. To mark his 25th anniversary in 2021 he commissioned a new statue honouring Winneba's Asafo companies at Winneba Senior High School. His 30th anniversary in January 2026 was attended by Effutu's member of parliament, Alexander Afenyo-Markin, and opened a fundraising campaign for a new palace.

Ghartey VII was 40 when he was enstooled. Besides his chieftaincy roles he has served on national committees on land, health and population, and he is Chief Patron of the Effutu Youth Development Association. The sister-city links with Birmingham and Charlottesville have brought educational, health and security facilities to Winneba, and the fish-handling study that he secured through the UNDP was carried out by the Norwegian research institute SINTEF Fisheries and Aquaculture; its report became the template for safe landing beaches in Winneba and elsewhere in Ghana. He has also donated equipment and supplies to institutions in the municipality and hosted a "Santa in the Library" event to encourage reading among local schoolchildren.

At the 2025 Aboakyer festival, held under the theme "Championing Our Ancestral Legacy", Ghartey VII received the live bushbuck brought in by the Tuafo company in the festival's central rite. The same festival saw the revival of the office of Osahen (chief warrior of the Effutu state), unfilled for more than 300 years, with the installation of Effutu's member of parliament, Alexander Afenyo-Markin. The Osahen leads the two Asafo companies and is the channel of communication between their leaders and the paramount chief.

In February 2026 Ghartey VII launched the 2026 Aboakyer festival, held from 25 April to 3 May under the theme "Advancing our cultural heritage for development". He linked the festival to his 30th anniversary and to a fundraising appeal for a new Chiefs' Palace for Winneba, which he described as a legacy for future generations. The Vice President of Ghana, Jane Naana Opoku-Agyemang, attended the festival's durbar on 2 May 2026 and praised his three decades of leadership.

His 70th birthday in April 2026 was marked by a ceremony chaired by Joe Ghartey, with a goodwill message from the University of Education, Winneba. In his address he recalled the opposition he had faced over his installation and credited prayer with carrying him through it.

== Succession disputes ==
The Winneba paramountcy has been the subject of repeated disputes between the Otuano Royal House and rival claimants, notably the family known variously as the Ayirebi Acquah house or the Tumpa Anona family.

- 1971–1977: A faction declared Ghartey V destooled in 1971, beginning a dispute that ended with the government's withdrawal of recognition in April 1977.
- 1977: The Judicial Committee of the Central Regional House of Chiefs, chaired by the Denkyirahene Boa Amponsem, ruled that only the Otuano Royal House could nominate, enstool and destool a paramount chief of Effutu.
- 1993–2011: Nana Ayirebi Acquah V was installed by a rival faction in 1993, the same year Ghartey VI was enstooled by the Otuano house. Ghartey VII's enstoolment in 1996 led to parallel claims to the stool. Tension between the two camps disrupted the Aboakyer festival for years; in 2002 the Central Regional Minister told the festival durbar that the government recognised Neenyi Ghartey because he was the only gazetted claimant.
- 2005: In December 2005 the head of the Otuano kingmakers, Ebusuapanyin Kweku Kyikyibi Gyan, with some elders and Asafo leaders, announced the destoolment of Ghartey VII, accusing him among other things of irregularities in his installation. Ghartey VII and a different group of elders in turn announced the removal of Kyikyibi Gyan.
- 2011: On 3 November 2011 the Court of Appeal set aside a High Court ruling of 1994 in a case brought on behalf of Ayirebi Acquah V; his supporters presented the judgment as confirming him as Omanhen.
- 2015: On 22 July 2015 the Supreme Court of Ghana unanimously dismissed an appeal by Nana Kow Mensah-King, head of the Tumpa Anona family, which had sought to set aside the 1977 Judicial Committee judgment; the court held that the question was a chieftaincy matter for the Houses of Chiefs.

Ephirim-Donkor records intermittent political violence in Winneba between 1976 and 2015, much of it in the months before the Aboakyer festival and aimed at preventing the king from performing the rites to the ancestors and to Penkye Otu.

As of 2026, Ghartey VII remains the recognised paramount chief and sits in the regional and national houses of chiefs; he celebrated thirty years on the stool in January 2026.

== Members ==
=== Rulers ===
Kings of Winneba from the Ghartey line
Stool name	Personal name	Born	Reign	Died	Notes
Ghartey I	Kwasi Gyan Ghartey	–	c. 1666–1712 (traditional)	–	Dates unverified
Gyateh Kumah III	–	–	fl. 1820s	–	Father of Ghartey IV
Ghartey IV	Kwamena Akyempong (Robert Johnson Ghartey)	c. 1820	1872–1897	30 July 1897	First King-President of the Fante Confederation
Ghartey V	Samuel Quamina Gyatekuma Ghartey	8 June 1889	1946–1952; 1953–1977	1977	Methodist minister; son of Ghartey IV
Ghartey VI	Kweku Atta Ghartey	22 April 1920	1993–1994	8 February 1994	Civil engineer; ILO official
Ghartey VII	Daniel Kobina Bortse Ghartey	3 April 1956	1996–present	–	16th king on the Otuano stool; Chancellor of UEW

=== Notable members and relatives ===
- Obaapanyin Ekua Kaadze, princess of Senya Beraku, wife of Gyateh Kumah III and mother of Ghartey IV.
- Sarah Efuwa Betse Ghartey, wife of Ghartey IV and mother of Ghartey V.
- Johannes G. Ghartey, son of Ghartey IV, a pupil at Queen's College, Taunton, who died in England before 1861.
- Jos. E. Ghartey, who signed Ghartey IV's final letters on his behalf in July 1897.
- The Rev. Markin, uncle of Ghartey V, who raised him after his father's death.
- Nana Akyeampong-Ghartey, grandson of Ghartey V and a commentator on Winneba history and chieftaincy.
- Joe Ghartey (born 1961), lawyer and New Patriotic Party politician. He co-founded the law firm Ghartey & Ghartey with his wife, Efua Ghartey, in 1994, and served as Attorney-General and Minister of Justice (2006–2009), member of parliament for Essikado-Ketan from 2005, Second Deputy Speaker of Parliament (2013–2017) and the first Minister for Railway Development (2017–2021). He sought the NPP presidential nomination in 2014, withdrawing after the super delegates' congress, and filed again for the 2023 contest. He was made a Companion of the Order of the Volta in March 2023 and chairman of the board of the Ghana Revenue Authority in 2024. He is from Shama, and news reports describe him as a principal elder of the Otuano royal family.
- Efua Ghartey (née Dickson), wife of Joe Ghartey and co-founder of Ghartey & Ghartey. A lawyer called to the bar in 1991 and a former chair of the Greater Accra branch of the Ghana Bar Association, she was elected the association's first female president on 11 September 2024 at its conference in Kumasi, at her third attempt, and remained in office in 2026.
- Kow Ghartey (also Kow Gyarteh), a principal elder of the Otuano royal family.
- David Kweku Ghartey-Tagoe (c. 1929 – 10 January 2016), broadcaster, of the Ghartey family of Winneba. He was educated at Mfantsipim School, Wesley College and the University of Cape Coast, and trained in broadcasting in Canada and the United States. He was the first Ghanaian to read the news on television, and in 1965 he became the first television newscaster in Ghana to use an autocue. He rose to be Director of Television, Deputy Director-General and later chief executive of the Ghana Broadcasting Corporation, and also taught at university. In retirement he founded Radio Peace in Winneba, one of Ghana's first community radio stations, which was named the country's best rural radio station in 2009. He was made a member of the Order of the Volta in 2011, was declared a distinguished son of the Effutu state, and wrote The Broadcaster's Companion (2010). He died at his home in Winneba and was survived by his wife, Jane Ghartey-Tagoe, and four children.
- Kodwo Ghartey-Tagoe, business executive, son of David Ghartey-Tagoe. He wrote the foreword to his father's biography. He left Ghana at the age of 19 to study economics in Canada, graduating from McGill University with joint honours in economics and finance, and took a Juris Doctor at Duke University School of Law in 1988. After becoming a partner at the law firm McGuireWoods in Richmond, Virginia, he joined Duke Energy in 2002 as chief regulatory counsel for Duke Power. He later served as senior vice president for state and federal regulatory legal support and as president of its electric utility in South Carolina, which serves about 800,000 customers. His appointment as executive vice president and chief legal officer was announced in August 2019 and took effect in October 2019; he added the post of corporate secretary in May 2020. In these roles he was the principal legal adviser to Duke Energy's board, led its legal, governance, internal audit and compliance functions, and oversaw human resources for its 28,000 employees. On 1 July 2025 he succeeded Julie Janson as executive vice president and chief executive officer of Duke Energy Carolinas and head of the company's natural gas business, including Piedmont Natural Gas, with responsibility for its regulated electric utilities in North and South Carolina. Duke Energy, a Fortune 150 company, supplies electricity to about 8.6 million customers. He holds an honorary doctorate from Francis Marion University, sits on the President's Advisory Board of Clemson University, and was named one of Savoy magazine's Most Influential Executives in Corporate America in 2024.
- Peter Kwamena Abbam (died 2024), diplomat. He was educated at Mfantsipim School and read Political Economy at St John's College, Oxford, then joined the Ghana Foreign Service, where he held ambassadorial rank. Ghana's Ministry of Foreign Affairs credited him with contributing to the establishment of many of Ghana's missions abroad, and the Effutu paramountcy honoured him as "a worthy son of the Effutu Stool".
- Alex Quaison-Sackey (9 August 1924 – 21 December 1992), diplomat and cousin of Peter Abbam. Born in Winneba and educated at Mfantsipim School, he was Ghana's Permanent Representative to the United Nations, the first African to serve as President of the United Nations General Assembly (1964–65), and Minister for Foreign Affairs under Kwame Nkrumah (1965–66). His memoirs, The Making of a Diplomatist, were published in 2022.
- Gisela Abbam OBE, Ghanaian-British healthcare executive. She was the first black chair of the British Science Association, succeeding Lord Willetts in January 2019, and was appointed chair of the General Pharmaceutical Council, the regulator for pharmacy in Great Britain, by the Privy Council in February 2022. She was named Black British Business Person of the Year in 2019 and appointed OBE in the 2026 King's Birthday Honours for services to the pharmacy professions and health. Through her mother's side she is descended from the barrister Frans Dove, father of the journalist and politician Mabel Dove Danquah and the singer Evelyn Dove.

=== Related families ===
==== Akyeampong-Ghartey ====
The compound name Akyeampong-Ghartey recalls Ghartey IV's birth name, Kwamena Akyempong. Nana Akyeampong-Ghartey, a grandson of Ghartey V who grew up in the palace during his grandfather's reign, has written on Winneba's history and the chieftaincy dispute.

==== Abbam family ====
The Abbam family of Winneba is related to the House of Ghartey. According to the Effutu state's account, members of the family founded Ateitu, one of the Simpa communities under the Effutu paramountcy: it was settled in the late 19th century by a hunter, Opanyin Kweku Abbam of Essuekyir, who had seventeen children by two wives, and a later head, Opanyin Kojo Abbam, swore the oath of allegiance to Ghartey V as the first substantive Odefe (chief) of Ateitu.

== Legacy and influence ==
=== Political ===
The Fante Confederation's constitution of 1871 set out a framework for Fante self-government, including state schooling for boys and girls; Adick presents this as an African contribution to the idea of a constitutional right to modern education. Ghartey IV was the Confederation's first King-President. Historians disagree about the movement. Nationalist historians such as Francis Agbodeka present it as a response to British colonial expansion, while Dennis Laumann argues that it was mainly a project of Western-educated coastal merchants (compradores) to secure political power alongside their commercial position, and that it failed because those merchants depended on the kings and chiefs to carry out their plans.

As King of Winneba, Ghartey IV served the British in two wars while opposing the alienation of Effutu land, and in the last week of his life he wrote to the Aborigines' Rights Protection Society during the agitation against the Lands Bill of 1897.

=== Economic ===
Through Ghartey Brothers the family took part in the expansion of the Gold Coast's export economy beyond palm oil into palm kernels, rubber, gold and timber. Dumett uses Ghartey's career to illustrate African commercial innovation and risk-taking in the period.

=== Religious and cultural ===
The family has been Methodist since Ghartey IV's time. Ghartey V served as a Methodist minister for over three decades, and several members of the family were educated at the Methodist Mfantsipim School, including Ghartey VI and Joe Ghartey. The thanksgiving service for Ghartey VII's 30th anniversary was held at Ebenezer Methodist Cathedral, Winneba. The kaba blouse attributed to Ghartey IV spread from his household at Anomabu to the rest of the country.

The Ghartey kings also remain custodians of Effutu stool rites tied to Penkye Otu, and the reigning Omanhen and his household have a central part in the Aboakyer festival.

=== Education ===
Ghartey V taught Prempeh II and Kofi Abrefa Busia early in his career and later sat on the board of the Specialist Training College, one of the institutions merged in 1992 to form the University of Education, Winneba. Ghartey VII became the university's Chancellor in 2023.

=== Historiography ===
The main published account of Ghartey IV's life is Magnus J. Sampson's chapter in Makers of Modern Ghana (1969). His career is also discussed in Francis Agbodeka's work on the Fante Confederation and British policy, in Raymond Dumett's studies of Gold Coast merchants, and in Lennart Limberg's 1974 thesis on the Confederation. Ephirim-Donkor's The Making of an African King (first published 2000) is the principal study of the Effutu kingship and its succession disputes.

== See also ==
- Fante Confederacy
- List of rulers of the Fante Confederation
- Efutu people
- Winneba
- Aboakyer festival
- Asafo
- Aborigines' Rights Protection Society
- Chieftaincy in Ghana
