= Ketan =

Ketan may refer to:

== People ==
- Ketan Anand
- Ketan Mehta
- Ketan Parekh
- Ketan Desai
- Ketan Karande
- Ketan Inamdar
- Ketan Mulmuley
- Ketan Garg
- Ketan Patel (investor)
- Ketan Patel
- Ketan Ramanlal Bulsara
- Ketan J. Patel
- Ketan Kadam
- Ketan Panchal
- Ketan Rahangdale
- Bijoy Ketan Mishra
- Sai Ketan Rao

== Other ==
- Bubur ketan hitam
- Ketan, Ghana
- Ketan Anand family
- Essikado-Ketan (Ghana parliament constituency)
- Joint Parliamentary committee Ketan Parekh share market scam (2001)
- Tapai ketan
