= Theresa Joyce Baffoe =

Ghanaian politician

Hon. Theresa Joyce Baffoe

Member of Parliament for the New Edubease Constituency
- In office October 1993 – 6 January 2005
- Preceded by: Mary Eugenia Ghann
- Succeeded by: Ernest Kofi Yakah

Personal details
- Born: 24 July 1954 (age 72) New Edubiase, Ashanti Region
- Party: National Democratic Congress
- Education: Holy Child College of Education
- Occupation: Politician
- Profession: Teacher

Theresa Joyce Baffoe (born 24 July 1954) is a Ghanaian politician and a former member of parliament for the New Edubease district of the Ashanti Region of Ghana. She was also a member of the Parliament Select Committee for Business.

== Early life and education ==
Baffoe was born on 24 July 1954 in New Edubiase, Ashanti Region. She attended Holy Child Training College where she trained as a teacher and obtained her Teachers' Training Certificate (Certificate A).

== Politics ==
Baffoe assumed office as a member of the 1st parliament of the 4th republic of Ghana in October 1993 after she emerged winner of the by-election that was held following the death of the then-occupant of the New Edubiase seat, Mary Eugenia Ghann.

Baffoe was once again elected into parliament on the ticket of the National Democratic Congress during the 1996 election. She polled 17,114 votes out of the 24,500 valid votes cast representing 55.50% against George Kwasi Boadu a member of the New Patriotic Party who polled 5,206 representing 16.90%, Sophia Afrakoma Owusu a CPP member, polled 1,678 votes representing 5.40%, and Kwasi Adei-Aboagye a PNC member, also polled 502 representing 1.60%.

Baffoe was also a member of the 3rd parliament of the 4th republic, after she was elected for the third consecutive time during the 2000 Ghanaian general election. She represented first on the ticket of the National Democratic Congress in 1992 and was elected after the completion of the 1996 Ghanaian General Elections where she obtained 11,908 votes of majority. She lost the seat in the 2004 Ghanaian general election. She decided to step down for another person, Ernest Kofi Yankah who polled 14,732 votes representing 54.45% to represent in 2008. she represented three times for the New Edubease constituency.

== Career ==
Baffoe is a teacher by profession. She had been teaching for twenty-eight years prior to entering politics. She had also served as a headmistress for fourteen years, and as principal superintendent of the Ghana Education Service.

== Personal life ==
Baffoe is a Christian, and a member of the Catholic Church of Ghana.
