= Grace Ayensu-Danquah =

Ghanaian politician

Hon. Grace Ayensu-Danquah MP

Member of Parliament for Essikado-Ketan
- Incumbent
- Assumed office 7 January 2025
- President: John Dramani Mahama
- Preceded by: Joe Ghartey

Personal details
- Born: May 10, 1967 (age 59) Essikado
- Party: National Democratic Congress
- Education: University of Southern California, University of Wisconsin–Madison, Johns Hopkins University
- Occupation: Gender Advocate, Humanitarian Surgeon, Educationist, Philanthropist, Politician

Grace Ayensu-Danquah (born 10 May 1967) is a Ghanaian gender advocate, humanitarian surgeon and a politician who is a member of the National Democratic Congress (NDC). She is the Member of Parliament for the Essikado-Ketan constituency. She operates a private surgical facility in Accra, Ghana, and is the founder of Healing Hands Organization, an NGO dedicated to providing medical and surgical care to underserved populations.

== Early life and education ==
Ayensu-Danquah was born on Wednesday, 10 May 1967 and grew up in Essikado in the Western Region of Ghana. Ayensu-Danquah had her O-level at Holy Child High School and A-level at Archbishop Porter Girls' Secondary School in May 1984 and May 1986 respectively.

She had her tertiary education at University of Southern California where she received her Bachelor's Degree in biology on 5 May 1995. She also has Doctorate of Medicine at University of Wisconsin May 2000. She further pursued her Masters in Public Health at Johns Hopkins University and completed in May 2001.

Ayensu-Danquah obtained her Humanitarian Assistance certificate from Johns Hopkins University School of Public Health in April 2001. She also obtained her Surgical Sub-Specialty certificate from University of California, San Diego in May 2008.

== Medical career ==
Ayensu-Danquah is a double board-certified surgeon specializing in general surgery, trauma, burns, and reconstructive surgery. She has practiced medicine in the United States, holding licenses in several states including California, Michigan, and Maryland. She is the founder of the Healing Hands Organization, a non-governmental organization that provides free medical and surgical care to underserved communities in Ghana, as well as medical equipment to rural health facilities.

In academia, she has served as a lecturer at the University of Cape Coast Medical School and as a faculty member affiliated with the Center for Global Surgery at the University of Utah.

She is also a fellow of several professional bodies, including the American College of Surgeons and the Ghana College of Physicians and Surgeons.

== Politics ==
In May 2023, she stood for the NDC primaries for Essikado-Ketan. She won the primaries accumulating 1,043 votes to win the contest ahead of Sebastian Spio-Garbrah and Henry Abbey-Hart who polled 85 and 18 votes respectively.

Ayensu-Danquah, in the 2024 General Elections, contested the Essikado-Ketan constituency against Charles Bissue, the candidate for the New Patriotic Party (NPP). She secured 26,166 votes (59.58%), narrowly defeating Charles Bissue, who garnered 17,754 votes (40.42%). This victory marked the first time in over a decade that the National Democratic Congress (NDC) captured the parliamentary seat in the constituency.

She was nominated and appointed Deputy Minister of Health in 2025, under the administration of John Dramani Mahama. As a legislator and health professional, she has focused on strengthening healthcare systems, improving access to medical services, and advocating for gender equality in leadership. She is currently a Secretariat Member of the African High-Level Ministerial Committee (AHLMC) helping to reform of the Africa's global health architecture.

== Personal life ==
Ayensu-Danquah is a Christian.

== See also ==
- Joe Ghartey
- John Dramani Mahama
