= Rahangdale =

Rahangdale is a surname. Notable people with the surname include:

- Ketan Rahangdale (born 1992), American entrepreneur
- Vijay Bharatlal Rahangdale, Indian politician
