= Adams Abdul Salam =

Ghanaian politician

Hon. Adams Abdul-Salam
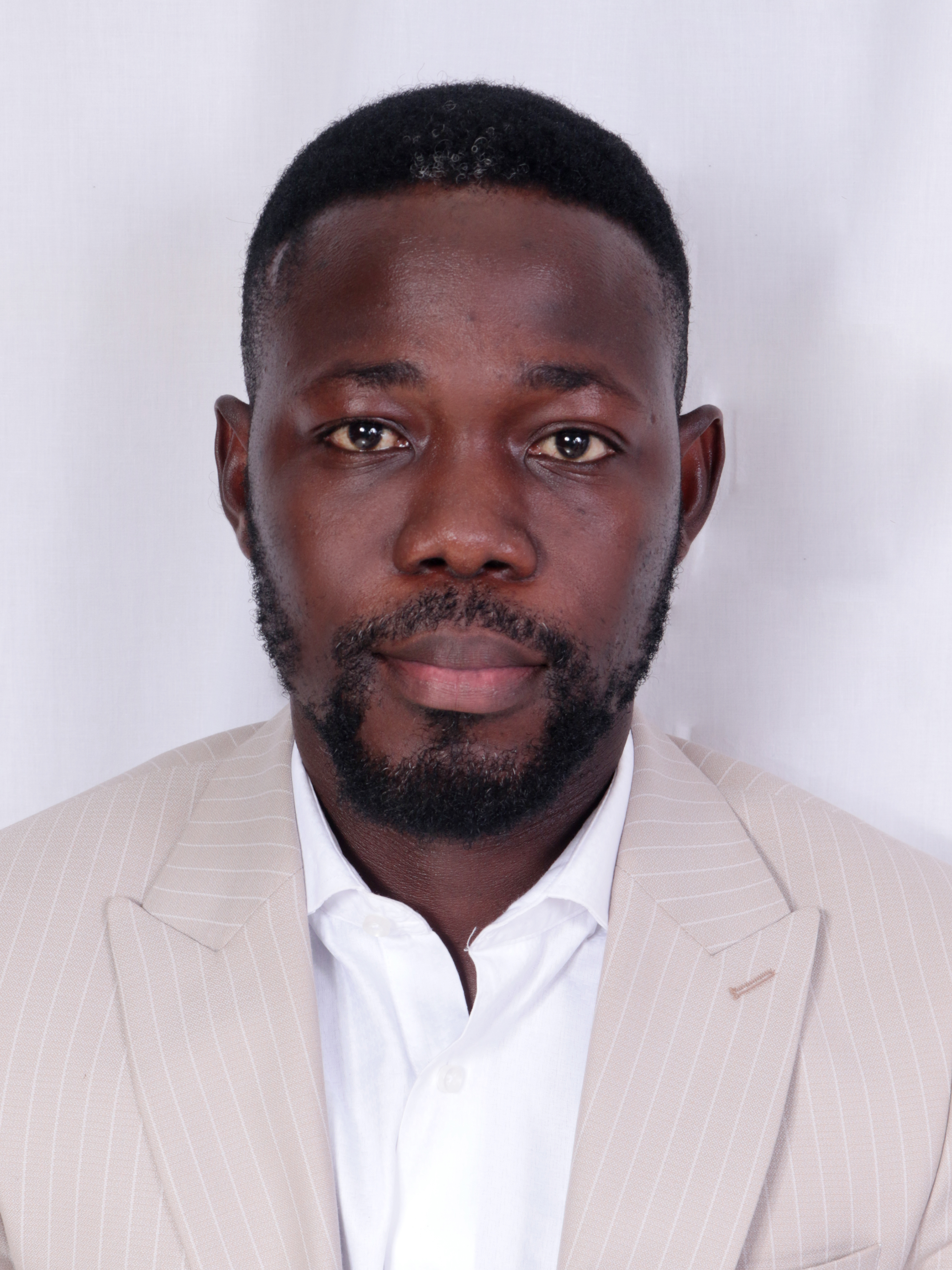

Member of Parliament for New Edubease Constituency
- Incumbent
- Assumed office 7 January 2021
- Preceded by: George Boahen Oduro

Personal details
- Born: Adams Abdul Salam; 16 December 1985 (age 40) New Edubiase, Ghana
- Party: National Democratic Congress
- Occupation: Politician
- Profession: Research Associate
- Committees: Subsidiary Legislation Committee; Local Government and Rural Development Committee

Adams Abdul-Salam (born on Monday, 16 December 1985) is a Ghanaian politician who is a member of the National Democratic Congress. He is the member of Parliament for the New Edubease Constituency in the Ashanti region.

== Early life and education ==
Adams Abdul-Salam was born in New Edubiase in Ashanti Region on 16 December 1985. He attended Kwame Nkrumah University of Science and Technology, Ghana where he completed with a Bachelor of Arts degree in political studies in 2009. Abdul-Salam holds a master's degree in Rural Development with emphasis on Rural Policy from Brandon University, Canada, completing in 2016. He is also an alumnus of Kumasi High School which he completed in 2003.

== Career ==
=== Early career ===
Abdul-Salam served as a Rural Policy Officer at the Rural Development Institute, Canada and later as a Research Associate Rural Community and Mental Health Lab, Brandon University Canada.

=== Football administration ===
He also served as an Administrative Officer at New Edubiase United Football Club. He currently serves as a board member of the club.

== Politics ==
=== Parliamentary bid ===
Abdul-Salam won the parliamentary bid to represent the National Democratic Congress for the New Edubease Constituency ahead of the 2020 elections in August 2019 after he went unopposed.

In December 2020, He won the New Edubease Constituency in the parliamentary elections. He won by polling 19,961 votes representing 52.4% against his closest opponent the incumbent member of parliament, George Boahen Oduro of the New Patriotic Party who obtained 17,913 votes representing 47.0% of the votes cast. The New Edubease seat was one of the seats that was taken away from the National Democratic Congress by the New Patriotic Party in the 2016 Parliamentary Elections but they couldn't retain it for an extra 4 years.

=== Member of Parliament ===
Abdul-Salam was sworn in as Member of Parliament representing the New Edubease Constituency in the 8th Parliament of the 4th Republic of Ghana on 7 January 2021.

==== Committees ====
He serves as a member on the Subsidiary Legislation Committee and the Local Government and Rural Development Committee of Parliament.

== Personal life ==
Abdul-Salam is a Muslim. His elder brother, Yakubu Abdul-Salam is the CEO, Founder and President of New Edubiase United Football Club. He is a Bissa by tribe.

== Philanthropy ==
In May 2022, he presented over 4,500 pieces of hand sanitizers to the people of New Edubiase Constituency during the COVID-19 pandemic in Ghana.
