= Ayikoi Otoo =

Ghanaian politician

Hon. Nii Ayikoi Otoo

18th Attorney General of Ghana
- In office 1 February 2005 – 2006
- President: John Agyekum Kufour
- Preceded by: Papa Owusu-Ankomah
- Succeeded by: Joe Ghartey

Personal details
- Born: Ghana
- Party: New Patriotic Party
- Education: Ebenezer Senior High School; Fijai Senior High School
- Alma mater: University of Ghana; Ghana School of Law
- Occupation: High Commissioner
- Profession: Lawyer

Nii Ayikoi Otoo is a Ghanaian lawyer and politician. He belongs to the New Patriotic Party. He served as attorney general and Minister of Justice of Ghana in the John Agyekum Kufour administration. He was Ghana's High Commissioner to Canada. He is the board chairman of Ghana Life Insurance Company(GLICO).

== Early life and education ==
Nii Ayikoi Otoo was born in Mamprobi, a town in the Greater Accra Region of Ghana, to E. K. A. Otoo and Emelia Otoo. He attended Ebenezer Secondary School in Accra and obtained his GCE Ordinary Level certificate. He had to move to Sekondi in the Western Region of Ghana so he could attend Fijai Secondary School. After obtaining his GCE Advanced Level certificate he was admitted to the University of Ghana in 1976 to pursue a degree in law. Upon completion in 1979, Nii Ayikoi Otoo enrolled at the Ghana School of Law. He was called to the Ghana Bar in 1981.

== Working life ==
Ayikoi Otoo did his one-year mandatory national service and then sojourned to Nigeria. When he returned to Ghana, he was employed by Adamafio & Associates, a law firm in Accra where he worked for over 20 years. In the early 2000s, he started his own chambers called Otoo & Associates Leo Chambers at Laterbiokorshie in Accra. He served as secretary and later as president of the Greater Accra Regional Bar Association for three consecutive terms, spanning between 1998 and 2001. He worked with his learned colleague Nana Akuffo-Addo on the National Council of the Ghana Bar Association. As a legal practitioner, Otoo handled a lot of high-profile cases which have been reported in the Ghana Law Reports and the Supreme Court of Ghana Law Reports. In the corporate, Otoo has served as a member of the Interim Management team of Sabat Motors, chairman of the board of directors of State Insurance Company (SIC). He is a fellow of the Ghana Institute of International Affairs. He was made the board chairman of GLICO Groupe in 2022.

== Political life ==
Ayikoi Otoo was appointed as the attorney general and minister of justice by President John Agyekum Kufour in 2005 to succeed Papa Owusu-Ankomah. He ended his term as the minister in April 2006 after a ministerial reshuffle. Hon. Joe Ghartey was named in his place. He was chairman of the Constitutional Committee of the New Patriotic Party in 2010 and was a member of the party's vetting committee that vetted the presidential hopefuls for the 2011 primary. In December 2011, Ga-Adangbe youth petitioned the leadership of the New Patriotic Party to consider making Ayikoi Otoo the running mate to the then Presidential candidate, Nana Addo Danquah Akuffo Addo. Nana Akuffo-Addo eventually settled on Mahamudu Bawumia as his running mate. In March 2017, President Nana Addo Dankwa Akufo-Addo appointed Ayikoi Otoo as Ghana's High Commissioner to Canada. He served in this position until 2021 when he was replaced by Anselm Ransford Sowah.

In April 2022, Otoo announced his decision to contest to be elected as national chairman of the New Patriotic Party. He vowed to whip up ministers and other appointees to attend to the needs of party faithful. He also promised to uphold and allow party rules governing internal elections to work. However, just days to the Party's National Delegates' Conference in July 2022, he announced his withdrawal from the race despite being cleared by the vetting committee for the contest.

== Personal life ==
Ayikoi Otoo is married to Patrica Otoo, with whom he has six children.
