= Anselm Ransford Sowah =

Anselm Ransford Adzetey Sowah is a Ghanaian banker, lawyer and diplomat. He is a former Managing Director of GCB Bank. He served as Ghana's High Commissioner to Canada from 2021 to 2025.

== Early life and education ==
Sowah attended Mfantsipim School in Cape Coast. He holds a Bachelor of Arts Degree in English and Philosophy from the University of Ghana. He is a barrister at law and solicitor of the Supreme Court of Ghana. He is a member of the British Bankers Association, Business Council for Africa and Association of Foreign Bank.

== Career ==
Sowah has been a banker for over three decades, during which he worked at Ghana Commercial bank Branch, Ghana International Bank and the Bank of Montreal Capital Markets, all in London, United Kingdom.At these Institutions and in the UK capital markets, he held senior management positions in Compliance, International Trade Finance, Retail Banking and Business Development. In 2017, he was appointed Managing Director of GCB Bank PLC. During his tenure, he led the Bank's digitisation drive, introducing the G-money platform which allowed clients to store and withdraw funds with their mobile devices. At its shareholder meeting in August 2020, it was announced that Sowah will leave the Bank. However, the Board agreed he stayed in acting position until September 30 when his replacement would have succeeded him.

== High Commissioner to Canada ==
In 2021, Sowah was appointed Ghana's High Commissioner to Canada by President Nana Akufo-Addo. He served in the role until 2025. He succeeded Ayikoi Otoo who served in that role from 2017 until 2021. As High Commissioner, he was on hand, in February 2022, to receive the symbolic key indicating Ghana's entry into the International Civil Aviation Organisation(ICAO). By this, Ghana's national identity card, known as the Ghana Card, was given approval as global E-passport, meaning travelers could use the card as a valid travelling document to board flights to Ghana at 44,000 airports around the world.
