= Holy Child College of Education =

Women's college of education in Ghana

- Established: 1946
- Affiliations: University of Cape Coast, Government of Ghana
- Location: Takoradi, Sekondi Takoradi Metro District, WS124, Ghana; 4.93675°N 1.74721°W
- Language: English
- Region Zone: Western; Central / Western
- Short name: Holico
- Website: https://holicoe.edu.gh/index.php
- Source: An Atlas of The Forty Colleges of Education in Ghana.

Holy Child College of Education is an all-female college of education in Takoradi (Sekondi Takoradi Metro District, Western Region, Ghana). The college is located in Central / Western zone. It is one of 46 public colleges of education in Ghana and is affiliated to the University of Cape Coast. The college participated in the DFID-funded T-TEL programme.

Dr Francis Hull Adams is principal of the college.

== Education ==
The college offers a general education programme and an early childhood programme. In 2016, 344 student teachers matriculated into the Diploma in Basic Education programme.

== History ==
Holy Child College of Education was originally opened in 1946 in Cape Coast before moving to its current site nine years later.

Holy Child College was originally established in 1946 in Cape Coast to offer the Post-Primary Certificate ‘A’ course. In 1950, A post-Secondary department was added to be followed in 1952 by the two-year Certificate ‘B’ course which was introduced as part of the Government's Accelerated Development Plan. On 18 February 1955 the college was moved to its present site on the top of Fijai Hill where it shares boundaries with Kweikuma, Archbishop Porter Girls Secondary School and Fijai Senior High School. At the time of relocation, the college was known as Adiembra Training College. The name was changed to Holy Child College derived from the Holy Child Community. The college was expanded to offer an additional course – the two-year post Certificate ‘B’, bringing the number of courses being offered at the time to four. In 1960, the Certificate ‘B’ course was stopped as a policy, thus allowing for substantial increases to be made in the enrolment figures for the other courses. In 1963, the college started a special Home Science bias four-year course aimed at producing teachers for Home Science Centres throughout the country. This course was stopped by a Government's decision in 1969 to be replaced by a two-year specialist course. In 1974, a two-year Vocational/Specialist course was introduced, which was also stopped as a government policy, in 1976. Following the recommendations made by the Dzobo Committee on Education reform, a 3-year Post Secondary Certificate ‘A’ course was started aimed at producing teachers for proposed Junior Secondary Schools. Various factors militated against the success of this course which was discontinued in August, 1979. A new Post-Secondary course structure was then drawn up to enable some kind of specialization, and this college was selected to offer Home Science. The Certificate ‘A’ 4-year Post-Middle course was re-introduced in September 1981. The college ran vacation classes under the modular teacher training programme. Holy Child College was under the headship of the Sisters of the Order of the Holy Child Jesus until 1982. The first substantive principal of the college was Mother Mary Joachim, who assumed duty in January, 1956. Mother Mary Edwin who acted as principal pending Mother Joachim's arrival became Vice Principal. At that time, the staff numbered nine. The college has produced a significant number of women teachers who are found functioning actively not only in the basic schools, but also in secondary and tertiary institutions. In other educational establishments some of them occupy high executive positions. Currently, the college runs a 3-year Diploma in Basic education (DBE) course for regular students. It also runs sandwich courses for untrained teachers and serving Certificate ‘A’ teachers, all leading to the award of Diploma in Basic Education.

Principals of the college since 1956 are:
Name	Years served
Mother Mary Joachim	1956 to 1961
Mother Mary Colum	1961 to 1967
Sister Kathleen Marine	1967 to 1973
Sister Mary Anita	1973 to 1981
Mrs. Lucy Peprah Tawiah	1982 to 1986
Mrs. Mabel A. Ephraim - Acting Principal	1986 to 1987
Miss Cecilia Pomary	1987 to1995
Mrs. Cecilia Harry Quaye	1995 to 2008
