= Ernest Kofi Yakah =

Ghanaian politician

Hon. Ernest Kofi Yakah

Member of the Ghana Parliament for New Edubease Constituency
- In office 7 January 2005 – 6 January 2017
- Preceded by: Theresa Joyce Baffoe
- Succeeded by: George Boahen Oduro

Personal details
- Born: 2 August 1959 (age 67)
- Party: National Democratic Congress
- Children: 6
- Education: University of Ghana
- Profession: Agriculturist

Ernest Kofi Yakah is a Ghanaian politician and member of the 6th Parliament of the 4th Republic of Ghana representing New Edubiase Constituency in the Ashanti Region of Ghana.

== Early life and education ==
Ernest Kofi Yakah was born on August 2, 1959. He hails from a town called Larve-Dabala in the Volta Region of Ghana. He had his Diploma Certificate in General Agriculture from University of Ghana, Legon.

== Career ==
Yakah is an agriculturist. He worked at National Disaster Management Organisation as a District Co-ordinator.

== Political career ==
Yakah was first elected into parliament in January 2005 after the 2004 Ghanaian General Elections where he represented the people of New Edubiase Constituency. In the 2008 Ghanaian general elections he maintained his seat on the ticket of the National Democratic Congress by obtaining 14,732 votes out of the 27,054 valid votes cast equivalent to 54.5% of total valid votes cast. He won against Kyei Baffour Degraft of the New Patriotic Party, Mariam Iddrisu of the People's National Convention and Joshua Appiah of the Convention People's Party. These obtained respectively 43.79%, 0.91% and 0.84% of total valid votes cast. Yakah therefore represented the New Edubiase constituency in the 5th parliament of the 4th republic of Ghana. He maintained his seat after being declared the winner in the 2012 Ghanaian General Elections under the flag of the National Democratic Congress. He was then defeated by his opposition in 2016.

== Elections ==
Yakah was elected as the member of parliament for the New Edubiase constituency of the Ashanti Region of Ghana in the 2004 Ghanaian general elections. He won on the ticket of the National Democratic Congress. His constituency was a part of the 3 parliamentary seats out of 39 seats won by the National Democratic Congress in that election for the Ashanti Region. The National Democratic Congress won a minority total of 94 parliamentary seats out of 230 seats. He was elected with 13,275 votes out of 26,440 total valid votes cast. This was equivalent to 50.2% of total valid votes cast. He was elected over Francis Dorpenydh of the New Patriotic Party and Sophia Afrakoma Owusu of the Convention People’s Party. These obtained 12,160 and 1,005 votes respectively of the total valid votes cast. These were equivalent to 46% and 3.8% respectively of total valid votes cast.

In 2008, he won the general elections on the ticket of the National Democratic Congress for the same constituency. His constituency was part of the 3 parliamentary seats out of 39 seats won by the National Democratic Congress in that election for the Ashanti Region. The National Democratic Congress won a majority total of 113 parliamentary seats out of 230 seats. He was elected with 14,732 votes out of 27,054 total valid votes cast equivalent to 54.45% of total valid votes cast. He was elected over Kyei Baffour-Degraft of the New Patriotic Party, Mariam Iddrisu of the People’s National Convention, and Joshua Appiah of the Convention People’s Party. These obtained 11,848, 246 and 228 votes respectively of the total valid votes cast. This was equivalent to 43.79%, 0.91% and 0.84% respectively of the total votes cast.

In 2012, he won the general elections once again for the same constituency. He was elected with 16,777 votes out of 32,388 total valid votes cast. This was equivalent to 51.80% of total valid votes cast. He was elected over Charles Mends Cann of the New Patriotic Party and Charles Cooker Anaman of the Progressive People's Party. These obtained 13,078 and 2,533 votes respectively of the total valid votes cast. These were equivalent to 40.38% and 7.82% respectively of the total votes cast.

== Personal life ==
Yakah is a Christian and married with six children.
