= Efua Ghartey =

Ghanaian lawyer

- Born: Ghana
- Occupation: Lawyer
- Known for: First female president of the Ghana Bar Association
- Spouse: Joe Ghartey

Efua Ghartey is a Ghanaian lawyer and current president of the Ghana Bar Association (GBA). She has more than 30 years of standing at the Bar and an extensive track record of service to the GBA. Ghartey made history by winning the Ghana Bar Association presidential elections held in Kumasi on Wednesday, 11 September 2024, becoming the first female president of the association.

Efua Ghartey was called to the bar on 4 October 1991 and has since established herself as an expert in various fields of law, including Corporate and Commercial Law, Intellectual Property Law, Trade and Investment Law, Alternative Dispute Resolution and Property Law. She has served as chairperson, member, secretary of several boards and organisations involved in various activities centred on children, export financing, aviation, media, education, and publishing since 1992

Early Life and Education

Efua attended Wesley Girls High School and continued to University of Ghana in 1989 where she graduated with B.A. (Hons). She further proceeded to Ghana School of Law and she was called to the bar in 1991.

Family Life

She is the wife of New Patriotic Party (NPP) Member of Parliament for Essikado-Ketan, Joe Ghartey. They have 5 Children together.
