= Ketan, Ghana =

Ketan
- Country: Ghana
- Region: Western Region (Ghana)

Ketan is a town in the Western region of Ghana. It is 15 kilometres from the centre Sekondi-Takoradi the Western regional capital. The serves as a dormitory town for workers who work in and around the Sekondi-Takoradi metropolis.

== Boundaries ==
The town is bordered on Kojokrom on the East, B.U on the West, Agric on the North and Baabakrom on the south.
