= Fijai Senior High School =

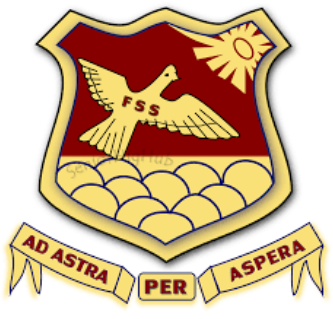

Location
- Sekondi-Takoradi; Western Region; Ghana
- Coordinates: 4.9296°N 1.7458°W

Information
- Type: Public, co-educational
- Motto: Ad Astra Per Aspera (To the stars through thick and thin)
- Established: 29 January 1952
- Status: Active
- Sister school: Mfantsipim School
- School district: Sekondi-Takoradi Metropolitan Assembly
- GES Category: A
- Headmaster: Mr Ken Abgomadze
- Faculty: 5
- Grades: 11th–20grade
- Gender: Male and female
- Enrolment: Yearly
- Language: English
- Campus: Aquiline Hills
- Campus type: Residential
- Houses: Anaisie House; Dadzie House; Quaye House; Tachie Menson House
- Colors: Blue-black, wine and white
- Athletics: Field and track Basketball; Volleyball
- Mascot: Aquilline Eagle
- Nickname: Young Souls
- Yearbook: The Aquila
- Alumni: Fijai Old Students Association (FOSA)
- Website: fijaishs.edu.gh

Fijai Senior High School, formerly Fijai Secondary School, is a co-educational senior high school located in the Western Region of Ghana. The name Fijai is from the native dialect "Afei Gyae Me", which literally means "Now, leave me alone".

== History ==
The school got under way in 1952 as Sekondi Day Secondary School, as part of the 1951 Accelerated Plan for Education of the then Gold Coast Government.

The school was commissioned by the Paramount Chief of Essikado, Nana Kobina Nketsiah IV on 29 January 1952 with 38 students (30 boys and eight girls). School was conducted in the buildings of the old Sekondi hospital.

The school moved to its current site in 1955 where it assumed its name Fijai Secondary School and recently changed to Fijai Senior High School.

== Emblem ==
The school emblem is an "Aquilline" eagle flying towards the sky and stars, through great storms and lightning as the school motto indicates Ad Astra Per Aspera, meaning "To the Stars Through Thick and Thin".

== Headmasters ==
Name	Tenure
Mr. Charles Quaye	1952–1965
Mr. A. R. Cudjoe	1965–1973
Mr. K. C. Mensah	1973–1982
Mr. J. E. Acquah	1983–1990
Mr. S. K. Folson	1990–1995
Mr. Isaac Blankson	1996–2002
Mr James H. Rhule	2002–2011
Mr. Joe Ocloo Nyamadi	2011–2017
Mr. Ken Abgomadze	2017 to present

== Notable alumni ==
- Sophia Ophilia Adjeibea Adinyira, justice of the Supreme Court of Ghana (2006—2019)
- Ayikoi Otoo, lawyer and politician
- General Emmanuel Alexander Erskine, soldier
- Joe Baidoo-Ansah, politician
- Papa Owusu-Ankomah, politician
- Nana Yaa Brefo, journalist, Angel FM 102.9
