= Sophia Adinyira =

Ghanaian Supreme Court judge

Justice Sophia Adinyira

Supreme Court Judge
- In office 2006–2019
- Appointed by: John Kufuor

Justice of the Appeal Court of Ghana
- In office 1999–2006
- Nominated by: Jerry Rawlings

Justice of the High Court of Ghana
- In office 1989–1999
- Nominated by: Jerry Rawlings

Personal details
- Born: Sophia Ophelia Adjeibea Adinyira; 1 September 1949 (age 77) Ghana
- Education: Fijai Senior High School; Wesley Girls' High School; University of Ghana; Ghana School of Law

Sophia Ophelia Adjeibea Adinyira (born 1 September 1949) is a Ghanaian retired Justice of the Supreme Court of Ghana and a member of the United Nations Appeal Tribunal.

== Early life and education ==
Adinyira was born in 1949 at Cape Coast in the Central Region of Ghana. She attended Fijai Senior High School from 1961 to 1966 for her 'O' Level certificate and Wesley Girls' High School from 1966 to 1968 for her 'A' Level certificate. She had her legal training at the University of Ghana and the Ghana School of Law, and was called to the Ghana Bar in 1973.

== Career ==
Adinyira worked at the Attorney General's Department in 1974 as an Assistant State Attorney. She served in that capacity until 1986 when she was elevated to the position of Principal State Attorney. In 1989 she was appointed to the High Court bench. She worked as a High Court judge for about a decade, and in 1999 was promoted to the Appeals Court bench. She was appointed to the Supreme Court on 15 March 2006. She also served as a Judge of the United Nations Appeals Tribunal from July 2009 to June 2016, sitting in New York and Geneva.

Adinyira is a member of the International Association of Women Judges and chairs the National Multisectoral Committee on Child Protection. She drafted a juvenile justice policy for Ghana supported by the Minister of Gender, Children and Social Protection and UNICEF. She is also a member of the General Legal Council, the body responsible for legal education in Ghana.

== Awards and recognition ==
Adinyira is a member of the Disciplinary Committee of the General Legal Council. She received a national award for her contribution towards "enhancing the destiny of the Ghanaian child" from the Minister of Women and Children on the twentieth anniversary of the UN Convention on the Rights of the Child.

== Personal life ==
Adinyira is a member of the Anglican Church and has been the Provincial Chancellor of the Church of the Province of West Africa since 1993. In 2019, she was appointed first female and lay Canon of the Cathedral Church of St Peter in the Anglican Diocese of Koforidua. She served as vice moderator of the World Council of Churches in Geneva and was a member of its Central Committee from 2006 to 2013. She is married with five children.

== See also ==
- List of judges of the Supreme Court of Ghana
- Supreme Court of Ghana
