= Kojokrom =

- Country: Ghana
- Region: Western Region (Ghana)

Kojokrom is a town in the Western region of Ghana. It is 12 kilometres from the centre Takoradi. It is about 2.7 kilometers from Sekondi, the Western regional capital. The town is used mainly as a dormitory town for various workers who work in the regional capital and its environs though quite a sizable number of residents also are engaged in the wood industry. Such residents either engage in trading of bulk planks of various woods or are carpenters.

== Boundaries ==
The town is bordered by other dormitory towns namely:

- Ketan
- Mpintisin
- Essikado
- Eshiem

== Notable places ==
A notable landmark in the town is the railway line that passes through the town. This also allows for a sizable amount of trading of wares along the railway lines.
