= Joe Ghartey =

Ghanaian lawyer and politician

Hon. Joe Ghartey
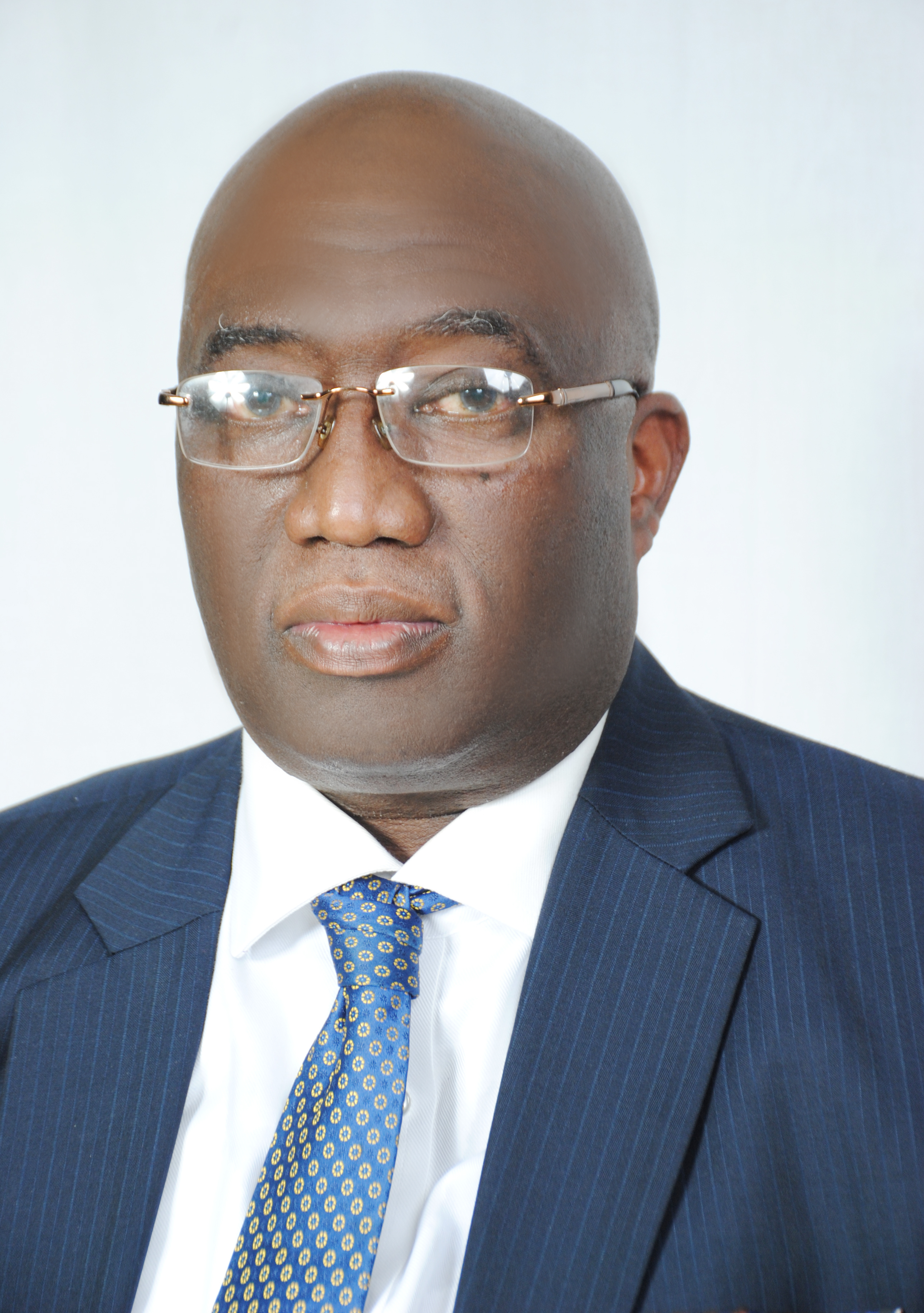

Minister for Railway Development
- In office 11 January 2017 – 6 January 2021
- President: Nana Akufo-Addo
- Preceded by: New position
- Succeeded by: John Peter Amewu

Second Deputy Speaker of Parliament
- In office 7 January 2013 – 6 January 2017
- Preceded by: Aaron Mike Oquaye
- Succeeded by: Alban Bagbin

Member of Parliament
- In office 7 January 2005 – 6 January 2025
- Preceded by: New constituency
- Succeeded by: Grace Ayensu-Danquah
- Constituency: Essikado-Ketan

19th Attorney-General and Minister of Justice
- In office 16 June 2006 – 6 January 2009
- President: John Kufuor
- Preceded by: Ayikoi Otoo
- Succeeded by: Betty Mould-Iddrisu

Personal details
- Born: 15 June 1961 (age 65) Accra
- Party: New Patriotic Party
- Spouse: Efua Ghartey
- Children: 5
- Education: Ridge Church School; Mfantsipim School
- Alma mater: University of Ghana; Ghana School of Law
- Occupation: Lawyer; Academic

Joe Ghartey (born 15 June 1961, in Accra) is a Ghanaian lawyer, politician and member of the New Patriotic Party. He is a former Attorney-General of Ghana (2006–2009), Second Deputy Speaker of Parliament (2013–2017) and Railways Development Minister (2017–2021). Joe Ghartey hails from Shama in the Western Region.

== Early life and education ==
Joe Ghartey was born in Accra, Ghana, to a teacher, Lauraine Ghartey (née Daniels), and a public servant, Joseph Ghartey, on 15 June 1961 and is a member of the House of Ghartey. He started his early education at the Ridge Church School in Accra and later moved to the secondary boarding school, Mfantsipim School, in Cape Coast.

After Mfantsipim, Ghartey enrolled to study law and obtained his LLB (Hons) degree in 1986 from the University of Ghana, and BL from the Ghana School of Law in 1988. In the same year he was called to the bar.

== Legal career and academia ==
Ghartey undertook his National Service duty as Legal Officer to the Komenda Eguafo Abirem District Assembly in the Central Region of the Republic of Ghana. He also took up a job as an Associate at the Chambers of Lawyer Gwira in Sekondi. Later, he would join the firm of Akufo-Addo, Prempeh & Co., a leading law firm in Ghana, which was co-founded by his future colleague parliamentarian and Cabinet Minister in the John Kufuor administration, Nana Akufo-Addo. Ghartey left this firm after seven years and in 1994 co-founded the law firm, Ghartey & Ghartey with his wife Efua Ghartey, who is also a lawyer. He is the senior partner of a Labone-based law firm.

Ghartey has provided legal services to several corporate entities and professional bodies, both nationally and internationally, ranging from the field of Taxation through to Labour law, Environmental and Company law.

He has supported human rights causes in Ghana. As a co-founder of the Ghana Committee on Human and Peoples Rights, Ghartey has provided education on Human Rights, Civil Rights and Obligations to various citizen groups. The committee was consequently given observer status at the African Commission on Human and Peoples’ Rights. He was chair of the Inter African Network of Human Rights Organizations based in Zambia.

Ghartey was an adjunct lecturer of Investment Law at the University of Ghana Business School. He has been a lecturer in Corporate Governance and Executive MBA at the Ghana Institute of Management and Public Administration (GIMPA). He was an instructor at the Ghana Stock Exchange. In 2004, he wrote Doing Business and Investing in Ghana – Legal and Institutional Framework. He also taught Company Law at the Ghana School of Law and Mountcrest University in Accra.

== Political career and governance ==
Ghartey is a member of the New Patriotic Party (NPP). He started off as a member of the Sekondi Campaign Team and became chairman of the Greater Accra Regional Disciplinary Committee of the Party. He was part of the team that wrote the "Stolen Verdict", in 1993, which was a detailed account of the widespread electoral malpractices that occurred during the 1992 general election in Ghana. He chaired the Session of the National Conference which amended the constitution of the NPP at the Trade Fair Center in Accra on 22 August 2009. This was when the Electoral College for the election of the presidential candidate was expanded from a few thousand delegates to more than one hundred thousand delegates. He was a member of the team of legal experts appointed by the National Council of the NPP to review the conduct of the election petition that was filed in the Supreme Court after the 2012 general elections and to provide recommendations going forward. The Committee submitted its report to the National Council. The report included proposals for reform of the electoral process in Ghana.

Along the coastal belt of Ghana, Ghartey has supported constituencies in the Western, Central, Greater Accra and Volta Regions, including Shama, Sekondi, Takoradi, Effie Kwasimintsim, Tarkwa, Prestea, Amenfi, Korle Klottey, La-Dade Kotopon and Hohoe. In 2000, he was part of the Western Regional Presidential Campaign Team of the NPP, travelling the region with the then candidate John Kufuor, who went on to win the general elections in December that year.

Ghartey is the NPP Member of Parliament for Essikado/Ketan Constituency in the Western Region of the Republic of Ghana. He was first elected to the seat in the December 2004 elections and was re-elected in the December 2008 and December 2012 elections. In all the three elections, he was not contested in the primaries of the NPP to choose the parliamentary candidate for the Constituency.

During the administration of President John Agyekum Kufuor, Ghartey was appointed Deputy Attorney General and Deputy Minister of Justice in March 2005. He was promoted and appointed as the substantive Attorney-General and Minister of Justice in June 2006, a position he held until January 2009 following the electoral loss of the NPP in the 2008 general elections. Ghartey was the longest-serving Attorney-General and Minister of Justice under the Kufuor administration. He was also a consultant to the Parliament of Sierra Leone and drafted a code of conduct for that parliament in May 2017.

=== Attorney-General and Minister of Justice ===
In June 2006, a Ministerial reshuffle by President Kufuor saw Ghartey being elevated from the position of Deputy Attorney-General and Minister of Justice to the Attorney-General and Minister of Justice. He was subsequently sworn into office by Kufuor on 16 June 2006 as the 20th Attorney-General and Minister of Justice of the Republic of Ghana.

As Attorney-General, Ghartey launched an Agenda for Change in the Ministry of Justice. The main aim was to improve the effectiveness of the office and justice delivery in Ghana. Its flagship programme was Justice for All which, among other things, aimed at providing access to the courts for people who had been in remand custody for long periods without prosecution. This programme saw the release of hundreds of incarcerated persons from custody who had not been prosecuted or convicted but were being held by the State.

As Attorney-General, he led his legal teams to court on several high-profile cases. His interest in investment law was evident in the development of the legal framework and infrastructure for the Oil and Gas Industry in Ghana. As a member of the Mines and Energy Committee of Parliament, he was instrumental in the decision to establish the Petroleum Commission of Ghana. As a cabinet minister, he represented the pre at several international fora on legal and investment matters.

=== Deputy Speakership ===
After the 2012 general elections, Ghartey was nominated by the NPP minority to the position of Second Deputy Speaker of Parliament. The position of the 2nd Deputy Speaker of Parliament by precedent goes to a minority party. However, following the NPP's challenge of the validity of the election of John Dramani Mahama as president of Ghana and their subsequent boycott of his inauguration, some members of the majority NDC were of the view that, "the NPP should not be rewarded with the position since it had decided to boycott the inauguration of John Mahama of the NDC as President in the same election it is challenging." The NDC, citing precedent by the NPP, who in the past had chosen to vote for Malik Alhassan Yakubu (an NPP candidate) against the NDC's Ken Dzirasah, wanted to sponsor a PNC newcomer to the position instead. However, Ghartey was eventually unanimously elected to the position by Members of Parliament on 7 January 2013.

Since assuming office, he has championed the formulation of rules to guard against conflict of interest among Ghana's legislators. Until his rise to the position of 2nd Deputy Speaker of Parliament, he was the Ranking member of the Constitutional and Legal Affairs Committee, member of the Government Assurances Committee and a member of the Mines and Energy Committee. He chairs the Committee of Members Holding Offices of Profit. He is a member of the Constitutional, Legal and Parliamentary Committee and the Standing Orders Committee.

=== Cabinet Minister ===
In May 2017, President Akufo-Addo created the Ministry of Railways Development as a cabinet position and named Ghartey as the sector Minister.

=== Campaign for NPP presidential candidate ===
Ghartey declared his intention to contest the position for presidential candidate of the New Patriotic Party before the 2016 general elections. He filed his nomination papers for the position on 7 July 2014, along with six other aspirants. There was a Special Delegates Congress on 31 August 2014 by the Party to trim the number of aspirants down to five, in accordance with the Constitution of the NPP. He was third but chose not to go for the second round and supported the winning candidate, Nana Addo Dankwa Akuffo-Addo, the president.

== Personal life ==
Joe Ghartey is married to Efua Ghartey, a lawyer and co-founder of the law firm, Ghartey & Ghartey. Efua Ghartey is the Chairperson of the Bible Society of Ghana and the Chairperson of the International Board of the United Bible Societies (UBS), which operates in more than 200 countries. She is the president of the Greater Accra Ghana Bar Association as well as a member of the Constitutional and Legal Committee of the New Patriotic Party. They have five children. Ghartey is a Christian.

Parliament of Ghana
Preceded by ?	Member of Parliament for Essikado Ketan^{1,2} 2005 – present	Succeeded by Present
Preceded by Mike Oquaye	2nd Deputy Speaker Parliament of Ghana^{1,2} 7 January 2013 – 7 January 2017	Succeeded by Alban Bagbin
Incumbent
Political offices
Preceded by	Deputy Attorney General and Minister of Justice; March 2005 – April 2006	Succeeded by
Preceded by Ayikoi Otoo	Attorney General and Minister of Justice^{1} April 2006 – January 2009	
Preceded by ?	Minister of Railroads; March 2017 – present	Incumbent
