= Mary Eugenia Ghann =

Ghanaian politician (died 1993)

MP for New Edubease
- In office 7 January 1993 – September 1993
- President: Jerry John Rawlings
- Preceded by: New
- Succeeded by: Theresa Joyce Baffoe

Personal details
- Born: Ghana
- Died: September 1993
- Party: National Democratic Congress
- Occupation: Politician

Mary Eugenia Ghann (died September 1993) was a Ghanaian politician and a member of the first Parliament of the fourth Republic representing the New Edubease constituency in the Ashanti region of Ghana. She represented the National Democratic Congress.

== Early life and education ==
Ghann was born at New Edubease in the Ashanti Region of Ghana.

== Politics ==
Ghann was elected into parliament on the ticket of the National Democratic Congress (NDC) to represent the New Edubease Constituency in the Ashanti Region of Ghana during the 1992 Ghanaian parliamentary election. She polled 7,939 votes out of the 100% valid votes cast. Following her death in September 1993, she was replaced by Theresa Joyce Baffoe who won the consequent by-election on the ticket of the NDC, she was sworn into office as a member of parliament for the New Edubiase constituency on 6 October 1993.

== Death ==
Ghann died in September 1993.
