= New Edubease (Ghana parliament constituency) =

Constituency in the Ashanti Region of Ghana

- constituency for the Parliament of Ghana
- District: Adansi South District
- Region: Ashanti Region of Ghana

Current constituency
- Party: National Democratic Congress
- MP: Adams Abdul Salam

New Edubease is one of the constituencies represented in the Parliament of Ghana. It elects one Member of Parliament (MP) by the first past the post system of election. New Edubease is located in the Adansi South district of the Ashanti Region of Ghana.

== Boundaries ==
The seat is located within the Adansi South District of the Ashanti Region of Ghana.

== Members of Parliament ==
Election	Member	Party
2016	GEORGE ODURO	NPP
1992	Mary Euginia Ghann	National Democratic Congress
1993	Theresa Joyce Boaffoe	National Democratic Congress
2004	Ernest Kofi Yakah	National Democratic Congress
2008	Ernest Kofi Yakah	National Democratic Congress
2012	Ernest Kofi Yakah	National Democratic Congress
2016	George Boahen Oduro	New Patriotic Party
2021	Adams Abdul Salam	National Democratic Congress

== Elections ==
2016 Ghanaian general election : New Edubease Source : Peacefmonline
Party	Candidate	Votes	%
NPP	George Boahen Oduro	18,477	56.47
NDC	Ernest Kofi Yakah	14,050	42.94
CPP	Solomon Boadu	191	0.58

2008 Ghanaian parliamentary election:New Edubease Source:Ghana Home Page
Party	Candidate	Votes	%	±%
National Democratic Congress	Ernest Kofi Yaka	14,732	54.5	—
New Patriotic Party	Kyei Baffour-Degraft	11,848	43.8	—
People's National Convention	Mariam Iddrisu	246	0.9	—
Convention People's Party	Joshua Appiah	228	0.8	—
Majority		2,884	10.7	—
Turnout		—	—	—

2000 Ghanaian parliamentary election:New Edubease Source:ThinkGhana.com
Party	Candidate	Votes	%	±%
National Democratic Congress	Theresa J.Baffoe	11,223	52.8	—
New Patriotic Party	Francis Dorpenyoh	6,150	28.9	—
People's National Convention	Memuna I. Ahmed	2,689	12.7	—
Convention People's Party	Sophia Afrakoma Owusu	711	3.3	—
Independent	Azameti C.F. Rafique	349	1.6	—
United Ghana Movement	Samuel Y.Obeng	132	0.6	—
Independent	Augustine A. Cudjoe	0	0	—
Majority		5,073	23.9	—
Turnout		—	—	—

== See also ==
- List of Ghana Parliament constituencies
