= Kwabotwe =

Kwabotwe is a hill in Ghana. It is the location of Mfantsipim, the oldest secondary schools in Ghana.
