= Laterbiokorshie =

Laterbiokorshie is a suburb of the city of Accra in the Greater Accra Region of Ghana.

== Famous places ==
- Radio Gold
- Presbyterian Vocational Institute
- Otoo & Associates Leo Chambers
