= Abura =

Abura may refer to:

- Abura, Iran, a village in Hamadan Province, Iran
- Achieng Abura (died 2016), Kenyan musician
- Mount Abura, Fukuoka, Japan
- Abura, ancient name of Khabur (Euphrates) a river of west Asia
- Abura-Dunkwa, the capital of Abura/Asebu/Kwamankese District, Central Region, Ghana
  - Abura/Asebu/Kwamankese District, Central Region, Ghana
