= Nana Kobina Nketsia V =

Ghanaian chief and academic

Nana Kobina Nketsia V (born Kojo Baffoe Maison) is a Ghanaian chief and academic. He completed his secondary education at Mfantsipim School in Cape Coast, Ghana. Nketsia obtained his first degree in Modern History from the University of Ghana, and later earned a Doctor of Philosophy in African History from the University of Calabar in Nigeria. His areas of interest include Pan-Africanism, African Culture and Religion, Governance, Law, and Philosophy.

== Career ==
Nana Kobina Nketsia V is the Paramount Chief (Omanhen) of the Essikado (British Sekondi) Traditional Area in the Western Region of Ghana and serves as the President of the Traditional Council. His tenure has been characterized by significant contributions to African culture and governance. He has authored a book titled African Culture in Governance and Development: The Ghana Paradigm, published by Ghana University Press.

In addition to his cultural and academic pursuits, Nana Nketsia has been actively involved in various leadership roles. He has chaired several important organizations and committees, including the Ghana Museums and Monuments Board, Ghana Broadcasting Corporation, and the Kwame Nkrumah Mausoleum Governing Board. He has also been involved with the National Festival of Arts and Culture (NAFAC), the Public Utilities and Regulatory Commission (PURC), and the African Regional Conference on Education for Cultural Heritage Development by UNESCO.

== Advocacy and social impact ==
Nana Nketsia is an advocate against illegal mining (galamsey) in Ghana. He has pledged his support to combat the environmental degradation caused by illegal mining activities in the Western Region and across the country. His stance emphasizes the need for collective action and the critical importance of safeguarding Ghana's land and natural resources.

== Honours and recognition ==
Nana Nketsia has received numerous accolades for his leadership and contributions to administration and management. These include the Western Region Personality of the Year, a Certificate of Appreciation from the PanAfrican Student Summit, an Honorary Fellowship from the Chartered Institute of Administration and Management Consultants, and the Traditional Ruler of the Year (2015) EXLA Award.

== Personal life ==
Nana Nketsia's personal interests include reading, writing, and games. He has been a lecturer by profession, contributing to the academic field through teaching and research. His work has had a significant impact on the understanding and preservation of African culture and heritage.
