= Ghartey VII =

Neenyi Ghartey VII is the Paramount Chief of the Effutu Traditional Area and traditional ruler of Winneba in Ghana.

== Early life and education ==
Ghartey VII was named at birth as Daniel Kobena Bortse Ghartey. He was born on April 3, 1957, in Winneba. Both of his parents were natives of Effutu Simpa. He attended Winneba Urban Council Primary School from 1967 to 1970, and continued his schooling at the Methodist Middle Boys' School. He proceeded to the Accra Academy where he had his secondary education. There, he obtained his GCE Ordinary Level Certificate in 1975. He later obtained his Advanced Level Certificate from Winneba Secondary School. He had his first degree from the University of Ghana, a Bachelor of Science from the Faculty of Agriculture with honours in Animal Science. Ghartey VII had a professional training at the Central Poultry Training Institute, Hessaraghatta in India.

== Chieftaincy ==
Neenyi Ghartey was installed as a chief on January 20, 1996, after the death of Neenyi Ghartey VI in 1994. He was confined for a year before his coronation. He then became a member of the National House of Chiefs from 2004 to 2008.

== Personal life ==
He is a religious man who loves religious and classical music.
