= Ketan Desai =

Ketan Desai may refer to:

- Ketan Desai (urologist), former president of Medical Council of India and President Elect (2016) of the World Medical Association
- Ketan Desai (director), Hindi film director, son of Manmohan Desai
