= Pra River =

Pra River may refer to:

- Pra River (Ghana)
- Pra (Russia), a tributary of the Oka
