= Ayvora =

Ayvora ايوراع
- Village
- Location within Iran
- Coordinates: 34°50′15″N 48°00′43″E
- Country: Iran
- Province: Hamadan
- County: Asadabad
- Bakhsh: Central
- Rural District: Chaharduli

Population (2006)
  - Total: 400
- Time zone: UTC+3:30 (IRST)
  - Summer (DST): UTC+4:30 (IRDT)

Ayvora (Persian: ايوراع, also Romanized as Ayvorā, Eyvarā‘, and Īvarā‘; also known as Abūrā‘) is a village in Chaharduli Rural District, in the Central District of Asadabad County, Hamadan Province, Iran. At the 2006 census, its population was 400, in 86 families.
