= Ketan Patel (investor) =

British strategist, author, and investor (born 1962)

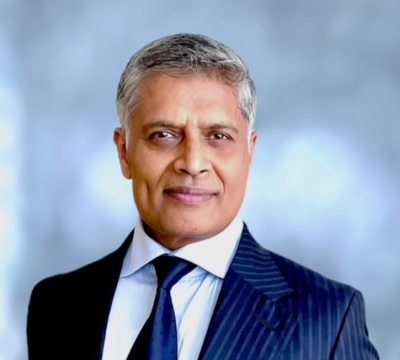
- Ketan Patel, Chairman, Force for Good; Co-Founder and CEO of Greater Pacific Capital.
- Born: February 1962 (age 64)
- Occupations: Strategist; investor; author
- Known for: Founder of the Strategic Group at Goldman Sachs; co-founder and CEO of Greater Pacific Capital
- Notable work: The Master Strategist

Ketan Patel (born February 1962) is a British strategist, investor and author. He is the co-founder and chief executive of the investment firm Greater Pacific Capital (GPC), and the founder and chairman of the Force for Good Initiative, which publishes research on investment, technology and sustainable development.

Patel previously served as a managing director at Goldman Sachs, where he founded and led the firm's Strategic Group. Earlier in his career, he was a partner at KPMG.

He is the author of The Master Strategist (2005).

== Early life and education ==
Patel was born in February 1962 and grew up in London. He graduated with a BSc in economics from the London School of Economics and completed an MBA at City University Business School. He holds the ACMA qualification from the Chartered Institute of Management Accountants and undertook postgraduate study in neuroscience at King's College London.

== Career ==
=== Goldman Sachs and KPMG ===
Patel worked at Hewlett-Packard before joining KPMG, where he became a partner. He later joined Goldman Sachs as a managing director in its investment banking division and founded the bank's Strategic Group. A 2003 profile in The Globe and Mail described him as Goldman Sachs' "chief futurologist".

=== Greater Pacific Capital ===
In 2005, Patel left Goldman Sachs and co-founded Greater Pacific Capital, a London-based investment firm. In 2007, the firm was reported to be bidding jointly with Torrent Pharmaceuticals for Merck's generics business in a transaction valued at approximately US$5 billion.

In 2018, GPC announced the first close of a US$700 million India-focused fund at US$300 million. The same year, the Overseas Private Investment Corporation committed US$125 million to one of the firm's funds.

=== Force for Good Initiative ===
Patel founded the Force for Good Initiative, which publishes research on investment, technology and sustainable development. Its publications include Capital as a Force for Good and The World Investment Plan (2025).

=== Institutional roles ===
Patel is an executive director and trustee of the World Academy of Art and Science. He has contributed to the Academy's journal, Cadmus.

== Ideas and writings ==
Patel's published work addresses geopolitics, capital allocation and systemic transitions in the international order.

In academic publications, he has examined historical patterns of great-power transition and their implications for contemporary strategic positioning. He has also argued that constraints on development progress relate more to allocation mechanisms and risk pricing than to aggregate capital scarcity.

His commentary has addressed sustainable development, climate transition pathways and digital public infrastructure in emerging markets.

== Reception ==
The Master Strategist was reviewed in Business Standard, which discussed Patel's emphasis on purpose and principle in strategic thinking. An endorsement quotation attributed to Nelson Mandela has appeared on editions of the book.

== Personal life ==
Patel lives in London and has cited meditation and long-distance running among his interests.

== Selected works ==
- The Master Strategist: Power, Purpose and Principle (Hutchinson, 2005).
- "American hegemony at a critical juncture" (with Christian Hansmeyer et al.), Frontiers in Political Science (2025).
- "Funding the Sustainable Development Goals is Not a Challenge of Sufficient Capital" (with co-authors), Cadmus (2025).
- The World Investment Plan (Force for Good, 2025).
