= Essikado =

- Country: Ghana
- Region: Western Region (Ghana)

Essikado is an Ahanta town in the Western region of Ghana. It is 12 kilometres from the centre Takoradi and 3 minutes drive from Sekondi.The Western region capital. It is used mainly as a dormitory town for various workers who work in the regional capital and its environs. The town is in the Essikado-Ketan constituency of Ghana. Grace Ayensu Danquah is the current member of parliament for Essikado Parliament of Ghana

== Boundaries ==
The town is bordered on Ngyiresia on the East, Ketan on the West, Kojokrom on the North and Gulf of Guinea and Sekondi on the south.

== Notable places ==
The Essikado Government Hospital is one of the major health centres in the Sekondi-Takoradi Metropolis. The health facility offers a wide range of medical services.
