= Ketan Patel =

Indian pharmacist

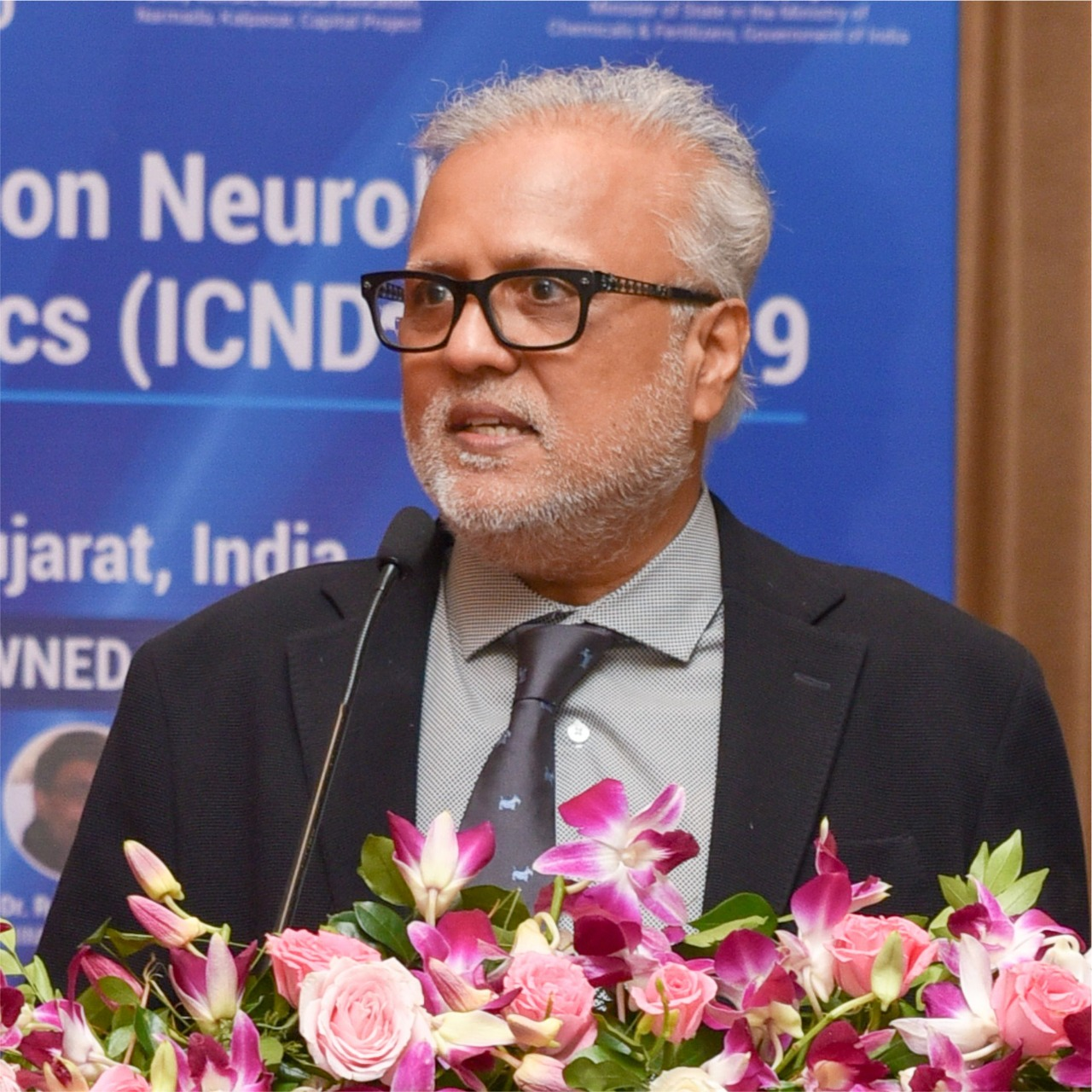
- Patel in 2019
- Born: Ketan Rajnibhai Patel; Ahmedabad, Gujarat, India
- Education: L. M. College of Pharmacy, GTU; Dharamsinh Desai University
- Occupations: Pharmacist, businessman

Ketan Patel is an Indian pharmacist, innovator, and serves as the chairman & managing director of Troikaa Pharmaceuticals, a pharmaceutical company headquartered in Gujarat, India.

Patel is the chairman of the Board of Governors at National Institute of Pharmaceutical Education & Research (NIPER), Gandhinagar.

== Education & career ==
Patel earned Gold Medals during both his Bachelor of Pharmacy and Master of Pharmacy programs from L. M. College of Pharmacy, Ahmedabad. He received a Ph.D. in Pharmaceutical Technology, which he obtained from Dharamsinh Desai University, Gujarat.

Patel established the "Rajnibhai.V. Patel Pharmlnnova Award" under the aegis of the Department of Science and Technology (India).

Details of his career are documented in the book titled 'THE INNOVATORS,' published by the Department of Science and Technology (India) Government of India.

== Invention ==
Patel is the primary inventor and patent holder of a painless diclofenac injection marketed under the brand name 'DYNAPAR-AQ' by Troikaa Pharmaceuticals Ltd. His innovation earned recognition from the Government of India’s Department of Science & Industrial Research, which honored him with the National Award in 2008.

In 2008, he invented a quick, powerful & long-lasting penetrating solution of Diclofenac designed for Topical administration known as “Dynapar QPS”, for which he was conferred with a National Award in 2015 from the Department of Science & Technology, Govt of India.

In 2019, he introduced a solution for Vitamin B12 deficiency. NasoB12, the world's first globally approved nasal drug delivery system, utilizes Methylcobalamin, the biologically active form of Vitamin B12, to effectively address Vitamin B12 deficiency, which has high prevalence in India and developing nations. NASO B12 was honored with the "India Star Award" for outstanding packaging design. This award was provided by the Indian Institute of Packaging, an autonomous body operating under the aegis of the Ministry of Commerce and Industry, Government of India.

In 2023, Xykaa IM, world’s first 500 mg Paracetamol/2ml injection was introduced by Ketan Patel and Milan Patel.

== Awards and honors ==
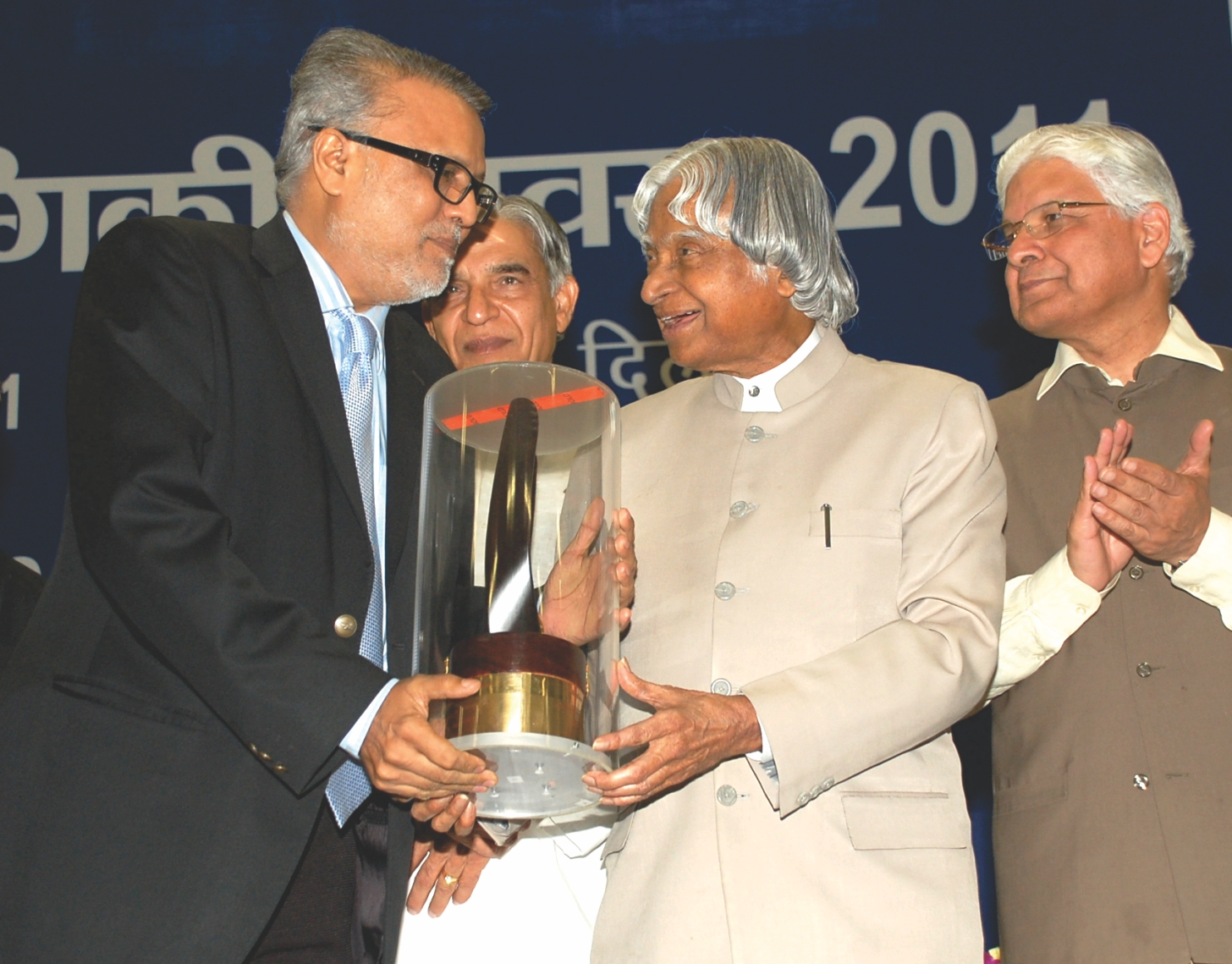
Ketan Patel receiving award from Dr. A.P.J.Abdul Kalam in 2011

- National Award by Department of Scientific & Industrial Research (DSIR) in 2011, facilitated by former President of India – A.P.J. Abdul Kalam for R&D efforts
