= Komenda =

Komenda may refer to:

- Komenda, Ghana, a town in the Central Region
  - Fort Komenda, a British fort on the Gold Coast
  - Komenda-Edina-Eguafo-Abirem (Ghana parliament constituency)
- Komenda, Slovenia, a town
  - Municipality of Komenda

== See also ==
- Komenda Wars, 17th-century wars involving Britain, the Netherlands and Eguafo along the Gold Coast
