= Ketan Rahangdale =

American businessman

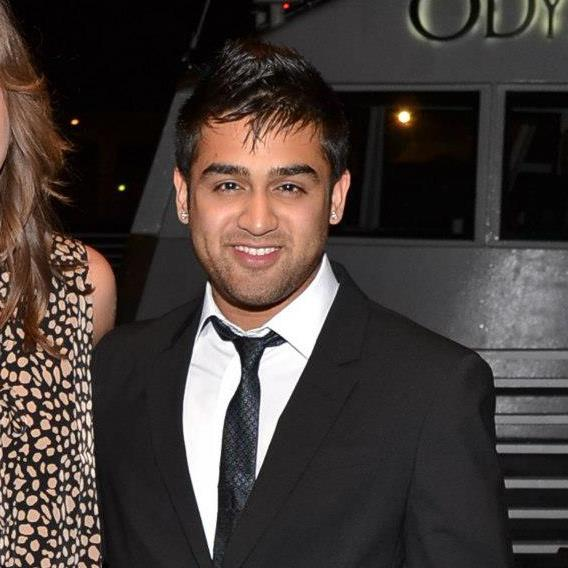
- Born: November 21, 1992 (age 33); Fayetteville, North Carolina
- Education: University of North Carolina
- Occupation: CEO of OTH Network
- Website: http://www.othnetwork.io/

Ketan Rahangdale is an American entrepreneur and the founder of OTH Network, Unitea, and EarTop Technologies. He is the youngest person on the Empact 100 list in 2012.

== Education ==
Ketan Rahangdale graduated from Lawton Chiles High School in Tallahassee, Florida in 2011, where he played tennis. He attended Babson College’s entrepreneurship program as a freshman, later transferring to University of Miami to be closer to his business partners. He is a member of the Launch Pad, the University of Miami’s entrepreneurship program.

Ketan completed his Master's in Business Administration from University of North Carolina at Chapel Hill with honors.

== Career ==
Rahangdale began DJing at parties and concerts at age 12. He decided to create wireless headphones and replace audio cables to make it easier for DJs to set up and maneuver. Rahangdale began pitching his idea at elevator and business pitch competitions: He was a semi-finalist at the Massachusetts Institute of Technology’s Elevator Pitch Competition and a 2012 ACC Startup Madness finalist.

Rahangdale raised $250,000 in angel funding and partnered with an engineering firm in Orlando, Florida to create the product. He and his business partners named the startup company “EarTop.” EarTop was started in Tallahassee, Florida in August 2011 and legally formed in January 2012.

After exiting EarTop at the age of 20, he co-founded JOOX Music as CEO, later known as Unitea, a Social Music Community. Ketan raised $7,000,000 in Seed funding for the Venture.

Consequently, Ketan advised the board of directors of Dirtybird on its sale to Empire in October, 2022.

He held a directorship position at Pennsylvania Transformer Technology Inc. from July 2011, until its sale to Quanta Services in November 2023.

Ketan's latest startup, "OTH Network" is a social currency based network connecting creators to businesses. Ketan serves as the Chairman of the Board of OTH.

== Awards ==
The Startup America Partnership and Empact named Ketan Rahangdale to their Empact 100 list, which is a group of entrepreneurs under the age of 30. Rahangdale was included in a White House ceremony for the Empact 100, and is the only CEO on the list under the age of 20.

Additionally, Rahangdale won the Kairos 50 award in 2012 & 2013, which recognizes business ventures by university students. He was also a finalist in the Technology Leaders of the Year Awards for 2012 in the Technology Student Entrepreneur category, an award given by the Greater Miami Chamber of Commerce.

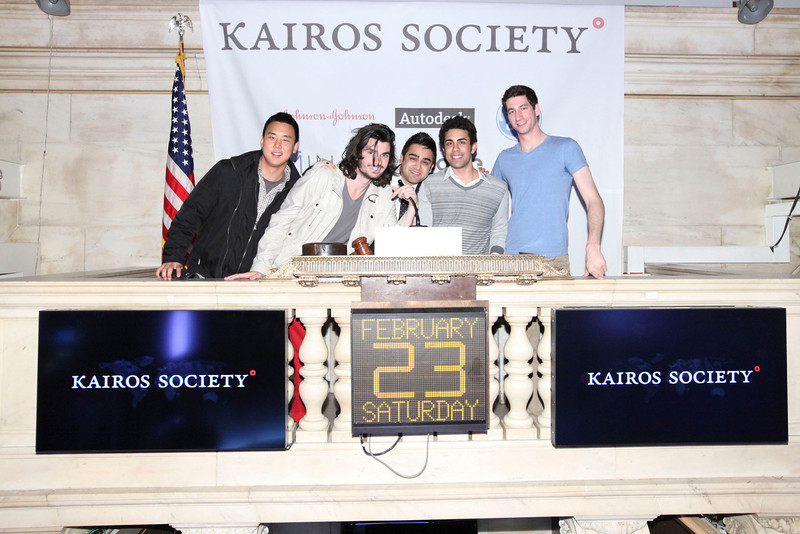
Ketan Rahangdale and other entpreneurs at the Kairos 2013 Global Summit

Ketan was awarded 2023's Poets and Quants "Best and Brightest" Top 50 MBA Graduates in the Nation.

== Memberships ==
Rahangdale is a member of the Kairos Society and President of the Southeast Region. He is also a member of the Young Entrepreneur Council of America.
