= George Oduro =

Ghanaian politician

Hon. George Boahen Oduro

Member of Parliament for New Edubease Constituency, Deputy Minister for Food and Agriculture
- In office 7 January 2017 – 6 January 2021

Personal details
- Born: George Boahen Oduro; 10 October 1965 (age 60) Atobiase, Ghana
- Party: New Patriotic Party
- Occupation: Politician
- Profession: Director

George Boahen Oduro is a Ghanaian politician and member of the Seventh Parliament of the Fourth Republic of Ghana representing the New Edubease Constituency in the Ashanti Region on the ticket of the New Patriotic Party. He was the Deputy Minister for Food and Agriculture.

== Early life and education ==
George Oduro was born on October 10, 1965, he hails from Atobiase in the Ashanti Region. He had his Bachelor of Science degree in Operations and Project Management from Ghana Institute of Management and Public Administration (GIMPA) in 2013. In 2015, he was awarded a Masters In Business Administrations(MBA) in International Trade from the Analt University.

== Personal life ==
Oduro is a Christian.

== Career ==
Oduro was the Director of Operations/Project of Cedar Seal Company Limited in Accra.

== Politics ==
He is a member of New Patriotic Party and was the former Member of Parliament (MP) for New Edubease Constituency.

== Philanthropy ==
In June 2019, he presented motorcycles to about 8 circuit supervisors of GES.

In December 2020, he donated sewing machines to about 40 apprentices in his constituency.
