= Essikado-Ketan (Ghana parliament constituency) =

Constituency in Ghana

- constituency for the Parliament of Ghana
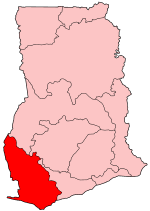
- District: Sekondi Takoradi Metropolitan Assembly
- Region: Western Region of Ghana

Current constituency
- Created: 2004
- Party: National Democratic Congress
- MP: Grace Ayensu-Danquah

Essikado-Ketan is one of the constituencies represented in the Parliament of Ghana. It is one of the most notable and popular constituencies in the western region. Essikado-Ketan is located in the Sekondi Takoradi Metropolitan Assembly of the Western Region of Ghana. The current Member of Parliament is Grace Ayensu Danquah

== Boundaries ==
The seat is located within STMA of the Western Region of Ghana. It was formed before the 2004 December presidential and parliamentary elections by the division of the old Sekondi constituency into the new Essikado-Ketan and Sekondi constituencies.

== Members of Parliament ==
Election	Member	Party
2004	Joe Ghartey	New Patriotic Party
2008	Joe Ghartey	New Patriotic Party
2012	Joe Ghartey	New Patriotic Party
2016	Joe Ghartey	New Patriotic Party
2020	Joe Ghartey	New Patriotic Party

== Elections ==
2004 Ghanaian parliamentary election:Essikado-Ketan Source:Electoral Commission of Ghana
Party	Candidate	Votes	%	±%
New Patriotic Party	[JOE GHARTEY]]	24,078	71.4	N/A
National Democratic Congress	David Mensah	8,976	26.6	N/A
Convention People's Party	Frank Noble Ankomah	652	1.9	N/A
Majority		15,102	44.8	N/A
Turnout		34,198	82.3	N/A

== See also ==
- List of Ghana Parliament constituencies
