= List of MPs elected in the 2024 Ghanaian general election =

MPs of the Fourth Republic of Ghana

Colonial Era
1951 Assembly	(election)
1954 Assembly	(election)
1956 Assembly	(election)
First Republic
1957 Parliament	(election)
1965 Parliament	(election)
Second Republic
1969 Parliament	(election)
Third Republic
1979 Parliament	(election)
Fourth Republic
1st Parliament	(1992)
2nd Parliament	(1996)
3rd Parliament	(2000)
4th Parliament	(2004)
5th Parliament	(2008)
6th Parliament	(2012)
7th Parliament	(2016)
8th Parliament	(2020)
9th Parliament	(2024)

The 2024 Ghanaian general election took place on 7 December 2024 to elect Members of Parliament (MPs) to the 9th Parliament of the Fourth Republic.

The Speaker is not an elected member of parliament though must be qualified to stand for election as such. There are a total of 276 constituencies in Ghana. The 9th Parliament first convened on 7 January 2025 to elect a Speaker and Deputy Speakers as well as for the administration of oaths to the Speaker and Members of Parliament.

One new constituency, Guan, was contested for the first time in this parliament. This brought the total number of constituencies up to 276. There were 801 candidates registered for the parliamentary election. These were from 12 political parties as well as a number of independent candidates. Interestingly, five entertainers are joining Dzifa Gomashie, a former actress in this parliament.

Results of the 2020 Ghanaian parliamentary election by constituency

Of the 275 seats declared so far, 128 of the parliamentarians are new entrants into parliament while 147 are returning members from the 8th parliament.

Results for a number of constituencies were disputed leading to some cases ending up in court. Most of these were sorted with the exception of Techiman South which was resolved by the Electoral Commission days before the inauguration of parliament. Results for the Ablekuma North constituency were not resolved prior to the inauguration. The Electoral Commission announced that there will be a re-run of the election in 19 of the polling stations in the Ablekuma North constituency on 11 July 2025 in order to decide the final result.

== Composition of parliament ==
Composition of parliament based on the 276 constituencies following the 7 December 2024 election.

Affiliation	Members
National Democratic Congress (NDC)	185
New Patriotic Party (NPP)	87
Independents	4
Total	276
Government Majority	91
Sources: ModernGhana; Ghanaweb; MyJoyOnline; MyInternetPeople

Composition following the Akwatia by-election on 2 September 2024. There is one seat still vacant following the death of the MP for Tamale Central on 6 August 2025.

Affiliation	Members
National Democratic Congress (NDC)	185
New Patriotic Party (NPP)	87
Independents	4
Vacant	1
Total	276
Government Majority	91
Sources:Graphic Online

== List of MPs elected in the general election ==
The election was keenly contested predominantly between the National Democratic Congress (NDC) and the New Patriotic Party (NPP).

Table of contents:

Ahafo Region • Ashanti Region • Bono Region • Bono East region • Central Region • Eastern Region • Greater Accra Region • Northern Region
North East Region • Oti Region • Savannah Region • Upper East Region • Upper West Region • Volta Region • Western Region • Western North Region
By-elections • Notes • Changes • See also • References • External links and sources

=== Ahafo Region - 6 seats ===
Constituency	Elected MP	Elected Party	Majority	Previous MP	Previous Party
Asunafo North	Mohammed Haruna	NDC		Evans Bobie Opoku	NPP
Asunafo South	Eric Opoku	NDC	900	Eric Opoku	NDC
Asutifi North	Ebenezer Kwaku Addo	NDC		Patrick Banor	NPP
Asutifi South	Collins Dauda	NDC		Collins Dauda	NDC
Tano North	Gideon Boako	NPP	3,420	Freda Prempeh	NPP
Tano South	Charles Asiedu	NDC	1,898	Benjamin Yeboah Sekyere	NPP
=== Ashanti Region - 47 seats ===
Constituency	Elected MP	Elected Party	Majority	Previous MP	Previous Party
Adansi-Akrofuom	Joseph Azumah	NDC		Alex Blankson	NPP
Adansi-Asokwa	Godwin Animli Dzogbazi-Dorani	NDC	954	Kobina Tahir Hammond	NPP
Afigya Kwabre North	Collins Adomako-Mensah	NPP		Collins Adomako-Mensah	NPP
Afigya Kwabre South	Damata Ama Appianimaa Salam	NPP		William Owuraku Aidoo	NPP
Afigya Sekyere East	Mavis Nkansah Boadu	NPP		Mavis Nkansah Boadu	NPP
Ahafo Ano North	Eric Nana Agyemang-Prempeh	NPP		Suleman Adamu Sanid	NPP
Ahafo Ano South East	Yakubu Mohammed	NDC		Francis Manu-Adabor	NPP
Ahafo Ano South West	Elvis Osei Mensah Dapaah	NPP		Johnson Kwaku Adu	NPP
Asante-Akim Central	Kwame Anyimadu - Antwi	NPP		Kwame Anyimadu - Antwi	NPP
Asante-Akim North	Ohene Kwame Frimpong	IND		Andy Kwame Appiah-Kubi	NPP
Asante-Akim South	Kwaku Asante - Boateng	NPP		Kwaku Asante - Boateng	NPP
Asawase	Mubarak Mohammed Muntaka	NDC		Mubarak Mohammed Muntaka	NDC
Asokwa	Patricia Appiagyei	NPP		Patricia Appiagyei	NPP
Atwima-Kwanwoma	Kofi Amankwa-Manu	NPP		Kofi Amankwa-Manu	NPP
Atwima-Mponua	Seth Osei-Akoto	NPP		Isaac Kwame Asiamah	NPP
Atwima-Nwabiagya North	Frank Yeboah	NPP		Benito Owusu Bio	NPP
Atwima-Nwabiagya South	Shirley Kyei	NPP		Emmanuel Adjei Anhwere	NPP
Bantama	Francis Asenso -Boakye	NPP		Francis Asenso -Boakye	NPP
Bekwai	Ralph Poku-Adusei	NPP		Joseph Osei-Owusu	NPP
Bosome-Freho	Nana Asafo-Adjei Ayeh	NPP		Akwasi Darko Boateng	NPP
Bosomtwe	Yaw Osei Adutwum	NPP		Yaw Osei Adutwum	NPP
Effiduase-Asokore	Nana Ayew Afriyie	NPP		Nana Ayew Afriyie	NPP
Ejisu	Kwabena Boateng	NPP		Kwabena Boateng	NPP
Ejura-Sekyedumase	Muhammad Bawah Braimah	NDC		Muhammad Bawah Braimah	NDC
Fomena (Adansi North)	Andrew Asiamah Amoako (Second Deputy Speaker)	NPP		Andrew Asiamah Amoako (Second Deputy Speaker)	IND
Juaben	Francis Kwabena B Owusu-Akyaw	NPP		Ama Pomaa Boateng	NPP
Kumawu	Ernest Yaw Anim	NPP		Ernest Yaw Anim	NPP
Kwabre East	Onyina-Acheampong Akwasi Gyamfi	NPP		Francisca Oteng Mensah	NPP
Kwadaso	Kingsley Nyarko	NPP		Kingsley Nyarko	NPP
Mampong	Kwaku Ampratwum-Sarpong	NPP		Kwaku Ampratwum-Sarpong	NPP
Manhyia North	Akwasi Konadu	NPP		Akwasi Konadu	NPP
Manhyia South	Nana Agyei Baffour Awuah	NPP		Matthew Opoku Prempeh	NPP
Manso Edubia	Frimpong Yaw Addo	NPP		Frimpong Yaw Addo	NPP
Manso Nkwanta	Tweneboa Kodua Fokuo	NPP		George Kwabena Obeng Takyi	NPP
New Edubease	Adams Abdul Salam	NDC		Adams Abdul Salam	NDC
Nhyiaeso	Stephen Amoah	NPP		Stephen Amoah	NPP
Nsuta-Kwamang-Beposo	Adelaide Ntim	NPP		Adelaide Ntim	NPP
Obuasi East	Patrick Boakye-Yiadom	NPP		Patrick Boakye-Yiadom	NPP
Obuasi West	Kwaku Agyemang Kwarteng	NPP		Kwaku Agyemang Kwarteng	NPP
Odotobri	Anthony Mmieh	NPP		Emmanuel Akwasi Gyamfi	NPP
Offinso North	Fred Kyei Asamoah	NPP		Augustine Collins Ntim	NPP
Offinso South	Isaac Yaw Opoku	NPP		Isaac Yaw Opoku	NPP
Oforikrom	Michael Kwasi Aidoo	NPP		Emmanuel Marfo	NPP
Old Tafo	Vincent Ekow Assafuah	NPP		Vincent Ekow Assafuah	NPP
Sekyere Afram Plains	Nasira Afrah Gyekye	NDC		Alex Adomako-Mensah	NDC
Suame	John Darko	NPP		Osei Kyei Mensah Bonsu	NPP
Subin	Kofi Obiri Yeboah	NPP		Eugene Boakye Antwi	NPP
=== Bono Region - 12 seats ===
Constituency	Elected MP	Elected Party	Majority	Previous MP	Previous Party
Banda Ahenkro	Ahmed Ibrahim	NDC		Ahmed Ibrahim	NDC
Berekum East	Simon Ampaabeng Kyeremeh	NDC		Nelson Kyeremeh	NPP
Berekum West	Dickson Kyere-Duah	NDC		Kwaku Agyenim-Boateng	NPP
Dormaa Central	John Kwame Adu Jack	NDC		Kwaku Agyeman-Manu	NPP
Dormaa East	Rachel Amma Owusuah	NDC		Paul Apreku Twum Barimah	NPP
Dormaa West	Vincent Oppong Asamoah	NDC		Vincent Oppong Asamoah	NDC
Jaman North	Frederick Yaw Ahenkwah	NDC		Frederick Yaw Ahenkwah	NDC
Jaman South	Kwadwo Damoah	NPP		Williams Okofo-Dateh	NDC
Sunyani East	Seid Mubarak	NDC		Kwasi Ameyaw Cheremeh	NPP
Sunyani West	Millicent Yeboah Amankwah	NDC		Ignatius Baffour Awuah	NPP
Tain	Adama Sulemana	NDC		Adama Sulemana	NDC
Wenchi	Haruna Seidu	NDC		Haruna Seidu	NDC
=== Bono East Region - 11 seats ===
Constituency	Elected MP	Elected Party	Majority	Previous MP	Previous Party.
Atebubu-Amantin	Sanja Nanja	NDC		Sanja Nanja	NDC
Kintampo North	Joseph Kwame Kumah	NDC		Joseph Kwame Kumah	NDC
Kintampo South	Felicia Adjei	NDC		Alexander Gyan	NPP
Nkoranza North	Joseph Kwasi Mensah	NDC		Joseph Kwasi Mensah	NDC
Nkoranza South	Emmanuel Kwadwo Agyekum	NDC		Emmanuel Kwadwo Agyekum	NDC
Pru East	Emmanuel Kwaku Boam	NDC		Kwabena Donkor	NDC
Pru West	Emmanuel Kofi Ntekuni	NDC		Stephen Jalulah	NPP
Sene East	Dominic Napare	NDC		Dominic Napare	NDC
Sene West	Kwame Twumasi Ampofo	NDC		Kwame Twumasi Ampofo	NDC
Techiman North	Elizabeth Ofosu-Adjare	NDC		Elizabeth Ofosu-Adjare	NDC
Techiman South	Martin Kwaku Adjei-Mensah Korsah	NPP		Martin Kwaku Adjei-Mensah Korsah	NPP
=== Central Region - 23 seats ===
Constituency	Elected MP	Elected Party	Majority	Previous MP	Previous Party
Abura-Asebu-Kwamankese	Felix Kwakye Ofosu	NDC		Elvis Morris Donkoh	NPP
Agona East	Queenstar Pokua Sawyerr	NDC		Queenstar Pokua Sawyerr	NDC
Agona West	Ernestina Ofori Dangbey	NDC		Cynthia Mamle Morrison	NPP
Ajumako-Enyan-Essiam	Cassiel Ato Baah Forson	NDC		Cassiel Ato Baah Forson	NDC
Asikuma-Odoben-Brakwa	Alhassan Kobina Ghansah	NDC		Alhassan Kobina Ghansah	NDC
Assin Central	Nurien Shaibu Migyimah	NDC		Kennedy Ohene Agyapong	NPP
Assin North	James Gyakye Quayson	NDC		James Gyakye Quayson	NDC
Assin South	John Ntim Fordjour	NPP		John Ntim Fordjour	NPP
Awutu-Senya East	Phillis Naa Koryoo Okunor	NDC		Mavis Hawa Koomson	NPP
Awutu-Senya West	Gizella Akushika Tetteh- Agbotui	NDC		Gizella Tetteh Agbotui	NDC
Cape Coast North	Kwamena Minta Nyarku	NDC		Kwamena Minta Nyarku	NDC
Cape Coast South	Kweku George Ricketts-Hagan (Deputy Majority Leader)	NDC		Kweku George Ricketts-Hagan	NDC
Effutu	Alexander Kwamina Afenyo-Markin (Minority Leader)	NPP		Alexander Afenyo-Markin	NPP
Ekumfi	Ekow Othniel Kwainoe	NDC		Abeiku Crentsil	NDC
Gomoa Central	Kwame Asare Obeng	IND		Naana Eyiah Quansah	NPP
Gomoa East	Desmond De-Graft Paitoo	NDC		Desmond De-Graft Paitoo	NDC
Gomoa West	Richard Gyan Mensah	NDC		Richard Gyan Mensah	NDC
Hemang Lower Denkyira	Lawrence Agyinsam	NPP		Bright Wireko Brobbey	NPP
Komenda-Edina-Eguafo-Abirem	Samuel Atta Mills	NDC		Samuel Atta Mills	NDC
Mfantseman	Ebenezer Prince Arhin	NDC		Ophelia Hayford	NPP
Twifo-Atii Morkwaa	David Theophilus Dominic Vondee	NDC		T.D. David Vondee	NDC
Upper Denkyira East	Emelia Ankomah	NDC		Festus Awuah Kwofie	NPP
Upper Denkyira West	Rudolf Amoako-Gyampah	NPP		Daniel Ohene Darko	NDC
=== Eastern Region - 33 seats === *** A court injunction has been placed on MP
Constituency	Elected MP	Elected Party	Majority	Previous MP	Previous Party
Abetifi	Bryan Acheampong	NPP		Bryan Acheampong	NPP
Abirem	Charles Asuako Owiredu	NPP		John Frimpong Osei	NPP
Abuakwa North	Nana Ampaw Kwame Addo Frempong	NPP		Gifty Twum Ampofo	NPP
Abuakwa South	Kingsley Agyemang	NPP		Samuel Atta Akyea	NPP
Achiase	Kofi Ahenkorah Marfo	NPP		Kofi Ahenkorah Marfo	NPP
Afram Plains North	Worlase Kpeli	IND		Betty Crosby Mensah	NDC
Afram Plains South	Joseph Appiah Boateng	NDC		Joseph Appiah Boateng	NDC
Akim Oda	Alexander Akwasi Acquah	NPP		Alexander Akwasi Acquah	NPP
Akim Swedru	Kennedy Osei Nyarko	NPP		Kennedy Osei Nyarko	NPP
Akropong	Sammi Awuku	NPP		Nana Ama Dokua Asiamah Adjei	NPP
Akwapim South	Lawrencia Dziwornu	NDC		Osei Bonsu Amoah	NPP
Akwatia		NPP		Ernest Kumi	NPP
Asene-Akroso-Manso	George Kwame Aboagye	NPP		George Kwame Aboagye	NPP
Asuogyaman	Thomas Nyarko Ampem	NDC		Thomas Nyarko Ampem	NDC
Atiwa East	Abena Osei Asare	NPP		Abena Osei Asare	NPP
Atiwa West	Laurette Korkor Asante	NPP		Kwesi Amoako Atta	NPP
Ayensuano	Ida Adjoa Asiedu	NPP		Teddy Safori Addi	NDC
Fanteakwa North	Kwame Appiah Kodua	NPP		Kwabena Amankwa Asiamah	NPP
Fanteakwa South	Duke Ofori-Atta	NPP		Kofi Okyere-Agyekum	NPP
Kade	Alexander Agyare	NPP		Alexander Agyare	NPP
Lower Manya Krobo	Ebenezer Okletey Terlabi	NDC		Ebenezer Okletey Terlabi	NDC
Lower West Akim	Owen Kwame Frimpong	NDC		Charles Acheampong	NPP
Mpraeso	Davis Ansah Opoku	NPP		Davis Ansah Opoku	NPP
New Juaben North	Nana Osei-Adjei	NPP		Kwasi Boateng Adjei	NPP
New Juaben South	Michael Okyere Baafi	NPP		Michael Okyere Baafi	NPP
Nkawkaw	Joseph Frempong	NPP		Joseph Frempong	NPP
Nsawam Adoagyiri	Frank Annoh Dompreh	NPP		Frank Annoh-Dompreh	NPP
Ofoase-Ayirebi	Kojo Oppong Nkrumah	NPP		Kojo Oppong-Nkrumah	NPP
Okere	Daniel Nana Addo Kenneth	NPP		Daniel Botwe	NPP
Suhum	Frank Asiedu Bekoe	NPP		Kwadjo Asante	NPP
Upper Manya Krobo	Bismark Tetteh Nyarko	NDC		Bismark Tetteh Nyarko	NDC
Upper West Akim	Emmanuel Drah	NDC		Frederick Obeng Adom	NPP
Yilo Krobo	Albert Tetteh Nyakotey	NDC		Albert Tetteh Nyakotey	NDC
=== Greater Accra Region - 34 seats ===
Constituency	Elected MP	Elected Party	Majority	Previous MP	Previous Party
Ablekuma Central	Dan Abdul-latif	NDC		Dan Abdul-latif	NDC
Ablekuma North	Ewurabena Aubynn	NDC		Sheila Bartels	NPP
Ablekuma South	Alfred Okoe Vanderpuije	NDC		Alfred Okoe Vanderpuije	NDC
Ablekuma West	Kweku Addo	NDC	5,291	Ursula G Owusu	NPP
Ada	Comfort Doyoe Cudjoe-Ghansah (First Deputy Majority Whip)	NDC		Comfort Doyoe Cudjoe-Ghansah	NDC
Adenta	Mohammed Adamu Ramadan	NDC		Mohammed Adamu Ramadan	NDC
Amasaman	Sedem Kweku Afenyo	NDC		Akwasi Owusu Afrifa-Mensa	NPP
Anyaa-Sowutuom	Emmanuel Tobin	NPP		Dickson Adomako Kissi	NPP
Ashaiman	Ernest Henry Norgbey	NDC		Ernest Henry Norgbey	NDC
Ayawaso Central	Abdul Rauf Tongym Tubazu	NDC	6,410	Henry Quartey	NPP
Ayawaso East	Naser Toure Mahama	NDC		Naser Toure Mahama	NDC
Ayawaso North	Yussif Issaka Jajah	NDC		Yussif Issaka Jajah	NDC
Ayawaso West Wuogon	John Dumelo	NDC		Lydia Alhassan	NPP
Bortianor-Ngleshie-Amanfro	Felix Akwetey Okle	NDC	9,813	Sylvester Tetteh	NPP
Dade Kotopon	Rita Naa Odoley Sowah	NDC	8,566	Rita Naa Odoley Sowah	NDC
Dome Kwabenya	Faustina Elikplim Akurugu	NDC		Sarah Adwoa Safo	NPP
Domeabra-Obom	Isaac Awuku Yibor	NDC		Sophia Karen Edem Ackuaku	NDC
Korle Klottey	Zanetor Agyeman-Rawlings	NDC		Zanetor Agyeman-Rawlings	NDC
Kpone-Katamanso	Joseph Akuerteh Tettey	NDC		Joseph Akuerteh Tettey	NDC
Krowor	Agnes Naa Momo Lartey	NDC		Agnes Naa Momo Lartey	NDC
Ledzokuku	Benjamin Narteh Ayiku	NDC		Benjamin Narteh Ayiku	NDC
Madina	Francis-Xavier Kojo Sosu	NDC		Francis-Xavier Kojo Sosu	NDC
Ningo-Prampram	Samuel George Nartey	NDC		Samuel George Nartey	NDC
Odododiodio	Alfred Nii Kotei Ashie	NDC	13,596	Nii Lantey Vanderpuye	NDC
Okaikwei Central	Patrick Yaw Boamah	NPP		Patrick Yaw Boamah	NPP
Okaikwei North	Theresa Lardi Awuni	NDC	7,736	Theresa Lardi Awuni	NDC
Okaikwei South	Ernest Adomako	NDC		Dakoa Newman	NPP
Sege	Daniel Keshi Bessey	NDC		Christian Corleytey Otuteye	NDC
Shai-Osudoku	Linda Obenewaa Akweley Ocloo	NDC		Linda Obenewaa Akweley Ocloo	NDC
Tema Central	Charles Forson	NPP		Yves Hanson-Nortey	NPP
Tema East	Isaac Ashai Odamtten	NDC		Isaac Ashai Odamtten	NDC
Tema West	James Enu	NDC		Carlos Kingsley Ahenkora	NPP
Trobu	Gloria Owusu	NPP		Moses Anim	NPP
Weija Gbawe	Jerry Ahmed Shaib	NPP		Tina Gifty Naa Ayeley Mensah	NPP
=== Northern Region - 18 seats ===
Constituency	Elected MP	Elected Party	Majority	Previous MP	Previous Party
Bimbilla	Dominc Aduna Bingab Nitiwul	NPP		Dominc Aduna Bingab Nitiwul	NPP
Gushegu	Alhassan S. Tampuli	NPP		Alhassan Tampuli Sulemana	NPP
Karaga	Mohammed Amin Adam	NPP		Mohammed Amin Adam	NPP
Kpandai	Matthew Nyindam	NPP		Daniel Nsala Wakpal	NDC
Kumbungu	Hamza Adam	NDC		Hamza Adam	NDC
Mion	Misbahu Mahama Adams	NDC		Musah Abdul-Aziz Ayaba	NPP
Nanton	Abdul-Khaliq Mohammed Sherif	NDC		Mohammed Hardi Tuferu	NPP
Saboba	Joseph Bukari Nikpe	NDC		Joseph Bukari Nikpe	NDC
Sagnarigu	Attah Issah	NDC		Alhassan Bashir Fuseini	NDC
Savelugu	Abdul Aziz Fatahiya	NPP		Jacob Iddriss Abdulai	NDC
Tamale Central	Ibrahim Murtala Muhammed	NDC		Ibrahim Murtala Muhammed	NDC
Tamale North	Suhuyini Alhassan Sayibu	NDC		Suhuyini Alhassan Sayibu	NDC
Tamale South	Haruna Iddrisu	NDC		Haruna Iddrisu	NDC
Tatale-Sanguli	Ntebe Ayo William	NDC		Thomas Mbomba	NPP
Tolon	Habib Iddrisu	NPP		Habib Iddrisu	NPP
Wulensi	Stanley Yaw Nandaya	IND		Abukari Dawuni	NPP
Yendi	Alhassan Abdul-Fatawu	NDC		Umar Farouk Aliu Mahama	NPP
Zabzugu	Alhassan Umar	NDC		John Bennam Jabaah	NPP
=== North East Region - 6 seats ===
Constituency	Elected MP	Elected Party	Majority	Previous MP	Previous Party
Bunkpurugu	Bandim Abed-Nego Azumah	NDC		Abed-nego Bandim	NDC
Chereponi	Seidu Alhassan Alajor	NDC		Abdul-Razak Tahidu	NPP
Nalerigu Gambaga	Nurideen Mumuni Muhammed	NPP		Issifu Seidu	NDC
Walewale	Mahama Tiah Abdul-Kabiru	NPP		Lariba Abudu	NPP
Yagaba-Kubori (Walewale West)	Mustapha Ussif	NPP		Mustapha Ussif	NPP
Yunyoo	Alhassan Sulemana	NDC		Oscar Liwaal	NPP
=== Oti Region - 9 seats ===
Constituency	Elected MP	Elected Party	Majority	Previous MP	Previous Party
Akan	Yao Gomado	NDC		Yao Gomado	NDC
Biakoye	Jean-Marie Formadi	NDC		Kwadwo Nyanpon Aboagye	NDC
Buem	Iddie Kofi Adams	NDC		Iddie Kofi Adams	NDC
Guan	Fred Kwesi Agbenyo	NDC		Vacant since creation	
Krachi East	Nelson Kofi Djabab	NDC		Wisdom Gidisu	NDC
Krachi Nchumuru	Solomon Kuyon	NDC		Solomon Kuyon	NDC
Krachi West	Helen Adjoa Ntoso	NDC		Helen Adjoa Ntoso	NDC
Nkwanta North	John Oti Bless	NDC	2,669	John Oti Kwabena Bless	NDC
Nkwanta South	Geoffrey Kini	NDC		Geoffrey Kini	NDC
=== Savannah Region - 7 seats ===
Constituency	Elected MP	Elected Party	Majority	Previous MP	Previous Party
Bole Bamboi	Yusif Sulemana	NDC		Yusif Sulemana	NDC
Daboya-Mankarigu	Shaibu Mahama	NDC		Mahama Asei Seini	NPP
Damango	Samuel Abu Jinapor	NPP		Samuel Abu Jinapor	NPP
Salaga North	Alhassan Mumuni	NDC		Alhassan Abdallah Ididi	NPP
Salaga South	Zuwera Mohammed Ibrahimah	NDC		Zuwera Mohammed Ibrahimah	NDC
Sawla-Tuna-Kalba	Andrew Dari Chiwetey	NDC		Andrew Dari Chiwetey	NDC
Yapei-Kusawgu	John Abdulai Jinapor	NDC		John Abdulai Jinapor	NDC
=== Upper East Region - 15 seats ===
Constituency	Elected MP	Elected Party	Majority	Previous MP	Previous Party
Bawku Central	Mahama Ayariga (Majority Leader)	NDC		Mahama Ayariga	NDC
Binduri	Mahmoud Issifu	NDC		Abdulai Abanga	NPP
Bolgatanga Central	Isaac Adongo	NDC		Isaac Adongo	NDC
Bolgatanga East	Dominic Akuritinga Ayine	NDC		Dominic Akuritinga Ayine	NDC
Bongo	Charles Bawaduah	NDC		Edward Abambire Bawa	NDC
Builsa North	James Agalga	NDC		James Agalga	NDC
Builsa South	Clement Apaak	NDC		Clement Apaak	NDC
Chiana-Paga	Nikyema Billa Alamzy	NDC		Thomas Adda Dalu	NDC
Garu	Anabah Thomas Winsum	NDC		Akuka Albert Alalzuuga	NDC
Nabdam	Mark Kurt Nawaane	NDC		Mark Kurt Nawaane	NDC
Navrongo Central	Simon Akibange Aworigo	NDC		Sampson Tangombu Chiragia	NDC
Pusiga	Laadi Ayii Ayamba	NDC		Laadi Ayii Ayamba	NDC
Talensi	Daniel Dung Mahama	NDC		Benson Tongo Baba	NDC
Tempane	Akanvariva Lydia Lamisi	NDC		Akanvariva Lydia Lamisi	NDC
Zebilla	Ebenezer Alumire Ndebilla	NDC		Cletus Apul Avoka	NDC
=== Upper West Region - 11 seats ===
Constituency	Elected MP	Elected Party	Majority	Previous MP	Previous Party
Daffiama-Bussie-Issa	Sebastian Ngmenenso Sandaare	NDC		Sebastian Sandaare	NDC
Jirapa	Cletus Seidu Dapilaah	NDC		Cletus Seidu Dapilaah	NDC
Lambussie	Titus Kofi Beyuo	NDC		Bakye Yelviel Baligi	NPP
Lawra	Bede A. Zeideng	NDC		Bede A. Zeideng	NDC
Nadowli Kaleo	Sumah Anthony Mwinikaara	NDC		Sumah Anthony Mwinikaara	NDC
Nandom	Richard Kuuire	NDC		Ambrose Dery	NPP
Sissala East	Mohammed Issah Bataglia	NDC		Issahaku Amidu Chinnia	NPP
Sissala West	Mohammed Adams Sukparu	NDC		Mohammed Adams Sukparu	NDC
Wa Central	Abdul-Rashid Hassan Pelpuo	NDC		Abdul-Rashid Hassan Pelpuo	NDC
Wa East	Godfred Seidu Jasaw	NDC		Godfred Seidu Jasaw	NDC
Wa West	Peter Lanchene Toobu	NDC		Peter Lanchene Toobu	NDC
=== Volta Region - 18 seats ===
Constituency	Elected MP	Elected Party	Majority	Previous MP	Previous Party
Adaklu	Kwame Governs Agbodza	NDC	12,053	Kwame Governs Agbodza	NDC
Afadjato South	Frank Afriyie	NDC	17,159	Angela Oforiwaa Alorwu-Tay	NDC
Agotime-Ziope	Charles Kwesi Agbeve	NDC	13,892	Charles Kwesi Agbeve	NDC
Akatsi North	Peter Kwasi Nortsu-Kotoe	NDC	7,587	Peter Kwasi Nortsu-Kotoe	NDC
Akatsi South	Bernard Ahiafor (First Deputy Speaker)	NDC	26,869	Bernard Ahiafor (First Deputy Speaker)	NDC
Anlo	Richard Kwame Sefe	NDC	32,288	Richard Kwame Sefe	NDC
Central Tongu	Alexander Roosevelt Hottordze	NDC	20,093	Alexander Roosevelt Hottordze	NDC
Ho Central	Richmond Edem Kofi Kpotosu	NDC	20,093	Benjamin Komla Kpodo	NDC
Ho West	Emmanuel Kwasi Bedzrah	NDC	23,067	Emmanuel Kwasi Bedzrah	NDC
Hohoe	Thomas Worlanyo Tsekpo	NDC	16,192	John Peter Amewu	NPP
Keta	Kwame Dzudzorli Gakpey	NDC	26,621	Kwame Dzudzorli Gakpey	NDC
Ketu North	Eric Edem Agbana	NDC	35,100	James Klutse Avedzi	NDC
Ketu South	Dzifa Abla Gomashie	NDC	72,869	Dzifa Gomashie	NDC
Kpando	Sebastian Fred Deh	NDC	13,412	Adjoa Della Sowah	NDC
North Dayi	Joycelyn Tetteh	NDC	8,055	Joycelyn Tetteh	NDC
North Tongu	Samuel Okudzeto Ablakwa	NDC	38,038	Samuel Okudzeto Ablakwa	NDC
South Dayi	Rockson-Nelson Dafeamekpor (Majority Chief Whip)	NDC	12,178	K. E. Rockson-Nelson Dafeamekpor	NDC
South Tongu	Maxwell Kwame Lukutor	NDC	40,261	Kobena Mensah Wisdom Woyome	NDC
=== Western Region - 17 seats ===
Constituency	Elected MP	Elected Party	Majority	Previous MP	Previous Party
Ahanta West	Mavis Kuukua Bissue	NDC		Ebenezer Kojo Kum	NPP
Amenfi Central	Joana Gyan Cudjoe	NDC		Peter Yaw Kwakye Ackah	NDC
Amenfi East	Nicholas Amankwah	NDC		Nicholas Amankwah	NDC
Amenfi West	Eric Afful	NDC		Eric Afful	NDC
Effia	Isaac Yaw Boamah-Nyarko	NPP		Joseph Cudjoe	NPP
Ellembelle	Emmanuel Armah-Kofi Buah	NDC		Emmanuel Armah-Kofi Buah	NDC
Essikado-Ketan	Grace Ayensu-Danquah	NDC		Joe Ghartey	NPP
Evalue-Ajomoro-Gwira	Kofi Arko Nokoe	NDC		Kofi Arko Nokoe	NDC
Jomoro	Dorcas Affo-Toffey	NDC		Dorcas Affo-Toffey	NDC
Kwesimintsim	Philip Fiifi Buckman	NDC		Prince Hamidu Armah	NPP
Mpohor	Bentil Godfred Henry	NDC		Kobina Abbam Aboah Sanie	NPP
Prestea-Huni Valley	Robert Wisdom Cudjoe	NDC		Robert Wisdom Cudjoe	NDC
Sekondi	Blay Nyameke Armah	NDC		Andrew Kofi Egyapa Mercer	NPP
Shama	Emelia Arthur	NDC		Samuel Erickson Abakah	NPP
Takoradi	Kwabena Okyere Darko-Mensah	NPP		Kwabena Okyere Darko-Mensah	NPP
Tarkwa-Nsuaem	Issa Salifu Taylor	NDC		George Mireku Duker	NPP
Wassa East	Isaac Adjei Mensah	NDC		Isaac Adjei Mensah	NDC
=== Western North Region - 9 seats ===
Constituency	Elected MP	Elected Party	Majority	Previous MP	Previous Party
Aowin	Oscar Ofori Larbi	NDC		Oscar Ofori Larbi	NDC
Bia East	Richard Acheampong (Second Deputy Majority Whip)	NDC		Richard Acheampong	NDC
Bia West	Mustapha Amadu Tanko	NDC		Augustine Tawiah	NDC
Bibiani-Anhwiaso-Bekwai	Bright Asamoah Brefo	NDC		Alfred Obeng Boateng	NPP
Bodi	Sampson Ahi	NDC		Sampson Ahi	NDC
Juabeso	Kwabena Mintah Akandoh	NDC		Kwabena Mintah Akandoh	NDC
Sefwi-Akontombra	Pious Kwame Nkuah	NDC		Alex Tetteh Djornobuah	NPP
Sefwi-Wiawso	Kofi Benteh Afful	NDC		Kwaku Afriyie	NPP
Suaman	Frederick Addy	NPP		Joseph Betino	NDC

== By-elections ==
- Akwatia - 2 September 2025 - A by-election was conducted following the death of the MP Ernest Kumi. Bernard Baidoo of the NDC won the seat with 18,199 votes, beating Solomon Asumadu of the NPP into second place with 15,235 votes. Third in the election was Patrick Owusu of the LPG with 82 votes. The total votes cast was 33,819. This result reduced the number of seats held by the NPP to 87. The NDC share of seats went up to 183.
- Tamale Central - 30 September 2025 - Following the death of Ibrahim Murtala Muhammed in a helicopter crash, a by-election was organised by the Electoral Commission. At the close of nominations, the main opposition party, the NPP did not present a candidate as it opted not to contest the election. Two opposition parties, the LPG and the PNC registered candidates and then withdrew them. Alidu Mahama Seidu was thus declared elected unopposed.
- Ayawaso East - 3 March 2026 - The Electoral Commission organised a by election due to the death of the MP, Naser Toure Mahama of the NDC. Baba Jamal, a former High Commissioner to Nigeria and also of the NDC won the by-election, beating Ibrahim Iddrisu of the Liberal Party of Ghana to second place and Yussif Baba Ali of the NPP to third.

== Notes ==
- On 7 January 2024, Alban Bagbin who was the Speaker in the previous parliament was elected to continue as Speaker of the 9th Parliament. He was nominated by the Majority Leader in Parliament, Cassiel Ato Forson of the National Democratic Congress (NDC). This was seconded by the Minority Leader Alexander Afenyo-Markin of the New Patriotic Party (NPP). There were no additional nominations so he was elected unopposed.
- Alban Bagbin has been involved with each of the 9 parliaments of the 9th republic. He was the elected MP for Nadowli Kaleo from the first parliament elected in the 1992 Ghanaian parliamentary election and retained his seat through every election until the 2016 Ghanaian general election for the seventh parliament. He was the elected speaker for the 8th parliament and re-elected to continue in the 9th parliament.
- Collins Dauda, MP for Asutifi South became the longest serving MP in the fourth republic as he was elected for his eighth term. He has been an MP in all the parliaments except the third between 2001 and 2005 when he lost his seat in the 2000 Ghanaian general election.
- Following the appointment of Cassiel Ato Forson, MP for Ajumako-Enyan-Essiam as Finance Minister, the role of Majority Leader in parliament was taken over by Mahama Ayariga, MP for Bawku Central. The MP for Cape Coast South, Kweku George Ricketts-Hagan, became Deputy Majority Leader in Parliament. Rockson-Nelson Dafeamekpor, MP for South Dayi became the Majority Chief Whip, replacing Kwame Governs Agbodza who was appointed Minister for Roads and Highways. Comfort Doyoe Cudjoe-Ghansah, MP for Ada was appointed as First Deputy Majority Whip and Second Deputy Majority Whip went to Richard Acheampong, MP for Bia East.

== Changes ==
The MP for Tamale Central, Ibrahim Murtala Muhammed died on 6 August 2025 in a helicopter crash alongside the Defence Minister and six other people on their way to Obuasi from Accra.

== See also ==
- 2024 Ghanaian general election
- Parliament of Ghana
- List of general elections in Ghana
