= Jean-Marie Formadi =

Ghanaian politician

Hon. Jean-Marie Formadi

Member of Parliament for Biakoye
- Incumbent
- Assumed office 2025

Personal details
- Born: May 4, 1977 (age 49) Ghana
- Party: National Democratic Congress

Jean-Marie Formadi (born 4 May 1977) is a Ghanaian politician and educationist who serves as the Member of Parliament for the Biakoye constituency in the Oti Region. She is a member of the National Democratic Congress (NDC).

== Early life and education ==
Formadi hails from Nkonya-Wurupong in the Oti Region of Ghana. She attended St. Francis Demonstration School, where she completed the Basic Education Certificate Examination (BECE) in 1992. She proceeded to Ola Senior Secondary School, where she obtained her Senior Secondary School Certificate Examination (SSSCE) in 1995.

She trained as a teacher at St. Theresa's Training College and earned a Teacher's Certificate 'A' in 1999. She later obtained a Bachelor of Science degree in Business Administration from the University of Ghana Business School in 2011. In 2020, she completed a Bachelor of Laws (LLB) degree at Mountcrest University College. She earned a master's degree from the Ghana Institute of Management and Public Administration (GIMPA) in December 2022.

== Career ==
Before entering politics, Formadi worked as a teacher, teaching at Englebert School and also serving under the Ghana Education Service (GES). Her professional background is rooted in education and public service. In the 2024 general elections, she contested and won the parliamentary seat for Biakoye on the ticket of the National Democratic Congress. She assumed office in January 2025, succeeding the previous representative for the constituency, and is currently serving in the 9th Parliament of the Fourth Republic of Ghana. In Parliament, she is a member of the Roads and Transportation Committee and the Committee of Selection.

== See also ==
- Parliament of Ghana
- National Democratic Congress (Ghana)
- Biakoye (Ghana parliament constituency)
