= Seidu Alhassan Alajor =

Ghanaian politician and Member of Parliament

Hon. Seidu Alhassan Alajor MP

Member of Parliament for Chereponi
- Incumbent
- Assumed office 7 January 2025

Personal details
- Born: May 15, 1979 (age 47) Kornu-Nansoni, Ghana
- Party: National Democratic Congress
- Education: Colorado State University; Colorado State University Global Campus; Tamale College of Education; Yendi Senior High School
- Occupation: Politician

Seidu Alhassan Alajor (born 15 May 1979) is a Ghanaian politician and Member of Parliament for the Chereponi Constituency in the North East Region of Ghana. He represents the National Democratic Congress (NDC) in the 9th Parliament of Ghana.

== Early life and education ==
Alajor hails from Kornu-Nansoni in Ghana. He attended Yendi Senior High School, completing in 2001. He proceeded to the Tamale College of Education and earned his Teacher's Certificate in 2005. He later studied at Colorado State University, graduating with a Bachelor of Arts in economics in 2016. In 2020, he earned an MBA in Finance from the Colorado State University Global Campus.

== Career ==
Before entering Parliament, Alajor worked as an educator and pursued further studies abroad. In the 2024 general elections, he contested and won the Chereponi parliamentary seat on the ticket of the National Democratic Congress and began his first term in January 2025. He currently serves on the Trade, Industry and Tourism Committee and the Backbenchers' Business Committee.

== Personal life ==
Alajor is a Muslim and resides in the North East Region.

== See also ==
- Parliament of Ghana
- List of MPs elected in the 2024 Ghanaian general election
- National Democratic Congress
