= Lariba Abudu =

Ghanaian politician

Hon. Lariba Abudu
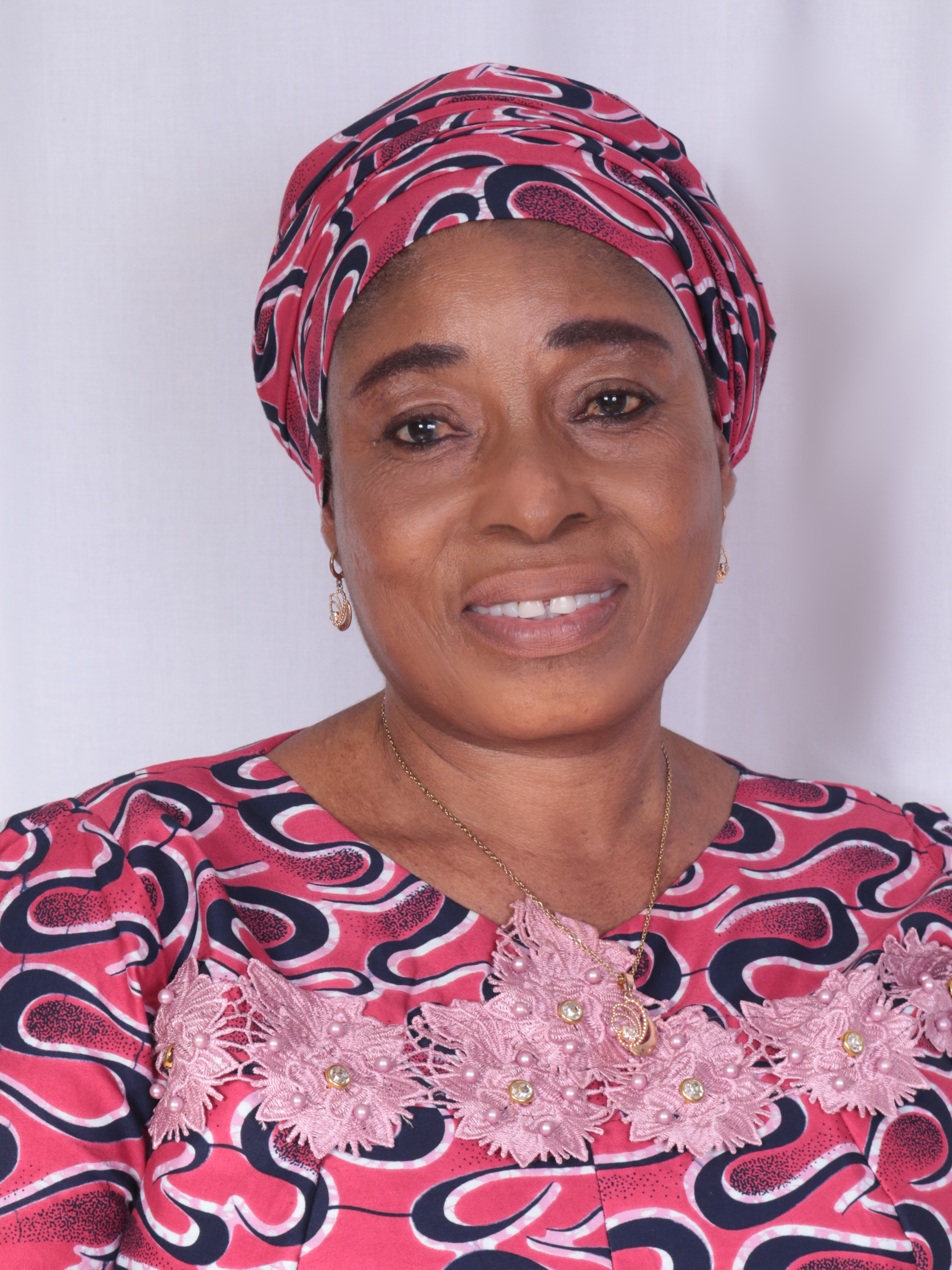

Member of Parliament for Walewale
- In office 7 January 2021 – 14 February 2024
- President: Nana Akuffo Addo
- Preceded by: Sagre Bambangi
- Succeeded by: Mahama Tiah Abdul-Kabiru

Minister for Ministry of Women and Children's Affairs
- In office May 2024 – January 2025
- Preceded by: Sarah Adwoa Safo
- Succeeded by: Agnes Naa Momo Lartey

Personal details
- Party: New Patriotic Party
- Relations: Mahamudu Bawumia
- Education: Masters in Leadership and Development – 2015 Degree (Special Education) – 2004 Certificate A – 1991
- Occupation: Educationists, politician
- Profession: Politician

Lariba Zuweira Abudu is a Ghanaian politician and former deputy chief executive officer of the Northern Development Authority since 2018. She became the member of parliament for Walewale constituency in the year 2020. Ghanaian General Elections. She was also a Minister for Children, Women, Gender and Social Protection.

== Early life ==
She obtained her first degree in special education in 2004 and her master's degree in leadership and development in 2015.

== Politics ==
Lariba Zuweira Abudu contested in the 2020 Ghanaian general election under the ticket of the New Patriotic Party and won. She polled 32,294 votes which represents 51.21% of the total votes cast. She was elected over Abdallah Abubakari of the National Democratic Congress and Ibrahim Mubarak of the National Democratic Party. These obtained 30,615 and 154 votes, respectively, out of the total valid votes cast. These were equivalent to 48.55% and 0.24% respectively, of total valid votes cast. She attained this victory after defeating the incumbent Member of Parliament for the NPP, who is also the Deputy Minister for Agriculture in charge of Crops, Dr. Sagre Bambangi in the party's parliamentary primaries in the Walewale Constituency. She emerged winner of the 2020 primaries election and represented the area in the 2020 parliamentary elections.

In August 2022, Nana Akuffo-Addo nominated Abudu as the Minister for Gender, Children and Social Protection and after undergoing vetting on 15 December 2022, she was approved by parliament on 22 December 2022. She was later relieved from office on 14 February 2024. On 27 January 2024, she lost her party's parliamentary primaries in the Walewale to Dr. Tia Kabiru Mahama, Technical Economic Advisor to Vice president Mahamudu Bawumia.
