= Richmond Edem Kofi Kpotosu =

Ghanaian politician

Hon. Richmond Edem Kofi Kpotosu

Member of Parliament for Ho Central Constituency
- Incumbent
- Assumed office 7 January 2025

Personal details
- Born: March 19, 1976 (age 50) Taviefe, Volta Region, Ghana
- Party: National Democratic Congress
- Education: University of Ghana (BFA); KNUST (MBA); University of Reading (Postgrad. Certificate); Mountcrest University College (LLB); University of Cambodia (MPhil)
- Profession: Politician, HR specialist
- Committees: Education Committee; Economy and Development Committee

Richmond Edem Kofi Kpotosu (born 19 March 1976) is a Ghanaian politician and Member of Parliament for the Ho Central Constituency in the Volta Region, representing the National Democratic Congress (NDC) in the Ninth Parliament of the Fourth Republic of Ghana.

== Early life and education ==
Kpotosu was born on 19 March 1976 and hails from Taviefe in Ho Central. He holds a BFA diploma (2005) and Diploma (2002) from the University of Ghana, a BA (Hons.) in Fine Arts (2005), an LLB (2017) from Mountcrest University College, an MBA (2010) from KNUST, and an MPhil (2024) from IIC, University of Cambodia.

== Career ==
Prior to politics, he served as Regional Human Resources Officer (Deputy Director) for the Ghana Education Service.

== Political career ==
In May 2023, Kpotosu was elected the NDC parliamentary candidate for Ho Central after winning the primaries.

He won the 7 December 2024 general election, receiving 62,325 votes (88.80%), defeating NPP's Divine Bosson and others.

After the election, Kpotosu stated that his leadership would focus on collaboration and inclusive development.

== Parliamentary roles ==
Kpotosu serves on the Education Committee and the Economy and Development Committee.
