= Charles Forson =

Ghanaian politician

Hon. Charles Forson MP

Member of Parliament for Tema Central
- Incumbent
- Assumed office 7 January 2025

Personal details
- Born: April 12, 1974 (age 52) Taido, Ghana
- Party: New Patriotic Party
- Occupation: Politician, Business Executive

Charles Forson (born 12 April 1974) is a Ghanaian politician and business executive. He is a member of the New Patriotic Party (NPP) and currently serves as the Member of Parliament for the Tema Central Constituency in the Parliament of Ghana.

== Early life and education ==
Forson hails from Taido in the Western Region of Ghana. He obtained a Certificate in Marketing from the Institute of Professional Studies in August 2007. He later completed a leadership programme at the Oxford University Department of Continuing Education in October 2019. In June 2021, he earned a Master's in Business Administration from Accra Business School, affiliated with the Kwame Nkrumah University of Science and Technology.

== Career ==
Forson has held marketing roles at Voting Technik Motors and Honda Place, where he worked as a marketing manager and consultant. He later served as managing director of Primeland Estates Limited and is the Executive Chairman of Prime Pharmacy Limited. In the 2024 general elections, he was elected to the Parliament of Ghana on the ticket of the New Patriotic Party to represent the Tema Central Constituency. In Parliament, he is a member of the Employment, Labour Relations and Pensions Committee and the Chairperson of the Backbenchers' Business Committee.
