= Isaac Opoku =

Isaac Opoku may refer to:

- Isaac Opoku (table tennis), Ghanaian table tennis player
- Isaac Yaw Opoku, Ghanaian politician

== See also ==
- Isaac Opoku Agyemang, Ghanaian footballer
