= Simon Akibange Aworigo =

Ghanaian politician

Hon. Simon Akibange Aworigo

Member of Parliament for Navrongo Central
- Incumbent
- Assumed office 7 January 2025
- Preceded by: Sampson Tangombu Chiragia

Personal details
- Born: October 19, 1974 (age 51) Navrongo, Upper East Region, Ghana
- Party: National Democratic Congress
- Education: University of Cape Coast (BSc); University of Leicester (MBA)
- Profession: Public servant, Politician
- Committees: Information and Communications Committee; Public Accounts Committee

Simon Akibange Aworigo (born 19 October 1974) is a Ghanaian politician and former public servant who currently represents the Navrongo Central Constituency in Parliament. A member of the National Democratic Congress (NDC), he was elected in the 2024 general elections to serve in the 9th Parliament of the Fourth Republic.

== Early life and education ==
Aworigo was born on 19 October 1974 in Navrongo in the Upper East Region of Ghana. He earned a Bachelor of Science degree from the University of Cape Coast in 2000, followed by a Master of Business Administration from the University of Leicester in the UK in 2014.

== Career ==
Before entering politics, Aworigo held various roles in the public sector, including serving as a vehicle auditor and supervisor with Keolis Amey Docklands in the United Kingdom. He was later selected as the NDC parliamentary candidate for Navrongo Central ahead of the 2024 general election, where he retained the seat by defeating NPP candidate Abdallah Otito Werseh Achuliwor with approximately 26,190 votes to 12,203. In Parliament, he serves on the Information and Communications Committee as well as the Public Accounts Committee.
