= Daniel Dung Mahama =

Ghanaian politician

Hon. Daniel Dung Mahama

Member of Parliament for Talensi
- Incumbent
- Assumed office 7 January 2025
- Preceded by: Benson Tongo Baba

Personal details
- Born: June 23, 1979 (age 47) Tongo, Upper East Region, Ghana
- Party: National Democratic Congress
- Education: Accra Polytechnic; Methodist University, Accra; KAIPTC
- Profession: Customs officer, Politician
- Committees: Trade, Industry and Tourism Committee; Standing Orders Committee

Daniel Dung Mahama (born 23 June 1979) is a Ghanaian politician, public administrator, and Member of Parliament for the Talensi Constituency in the Upper East Region, representing the National Democratic Congress (NDC) in the 9th Parliament of the Fourth Republic of Ghana.

== Early life and education ==
Mahama was born on 23 June 1979 in Tongo, the capital of the Talensi District in the Upper East Region of Ghana. He began his basic education at Nakpanduri Presby Primary School and later attended Bolgatanga Secondary School. He proceeded to Accra Polytechnic, where he obtained a Higher National Diploma (HND) in Accounting. Mahama continued his education at Methodist University Ghana, earning a Bachelor of Science degree in economics and an MBA in Finance. He also undertook professional training at the Kofi Annan International Peacekeeping Training Centre (KAIPTC), where he obtained a certificate in conflict resolution and governance.

== Career ==
Before entering politics, Mahama worked with the Ghana Revenue Authority (GRA)–Customs Division, where he rose to the rank of Senior Revenue Officer and served in various union and administrative roles. He contested and won the NDC parliamentary primaries in Talensi in May 2023, succeeding incumbent MP Benson Tongo Baba, who did not seek re-election. In the 2024 general election, he was elected as Member of Parliament for Talensi on the ticket of the National Democratic Congress and was sworn in on 7 January 2025 as part of the 9th Parliament of the Fourth Republic. In Parliament, Mahama serves on the Trade, Industry and Tourism Committee as well as the Standing Orders Committee.
