= Anabah Thomas Winsum =

Ghanaian anesthesiologist, academic, and politician

Hon. Thomas Winsum Anabah MP

Member of Parliament for Garu Constituency
- Incumbent
- Assumed office January 2025

Personal details
- Born: March 7, 1975 (age 51)
- Party: National Democratic Congress
- Education: ELAM (Cuba); University for Development Studies; GIMPA
- Profession: Anesthesiologist, Medical Educator, Politician

Thomas Winsum Anabah (born 7 March 1975) is a Ghanaian politician and anesthesiologist who currently serves as the Member of Parliament for the Garu Constituency in the Upper East Region. He was elected on the ticket of the National Democratic Congress (NDC) during the 2024 general elections.

== Early life and education ==
Anabah was born on 7 March 1975. He received his medical education in Cuba, earning his MD in 2001 and specializing in anesthesiology and resuscitation in 2007. In 2013, he underwent training in emergency medical simulation at the University of Miami. Between 2016 and 2018, he obtained diplomas in Health Management and Health Systems Planning from the Ghana Institute of Management and Public Administration (GIMPA). He also holds an MSc in Critical Care from an Italian university.

== Career ==
Anabah began his medical career at Korle-Bu Teaching Hospital and later served in leadership roles at Ridge Hospital and Tamale Teaching Hospital, where he led the anesthesia departments. He became the first medical director of Ridge Regional Hospital in Accra, overseeing its transition into a modern regional referral facility.

In academia, he is a Senior Lecturer and Head of the Department of Anesthesia at the University for Development Studies, and has supported the development of anesthesia training programs, including the establishment of a Bachelor of Science in Nurse Anesthesia program.

Politically, Anabah won the NDC parliamentary primaries for the Garu Constituency in 2024 and was subsequently elected as a Member of Parliament in the 2024 Ghana general elections. He currently serves on the Business Committee and the Health Committee in the 9th Parliament of the fourth Republic of Ghana.

== See also ==
- Garu (Ghana parliament constituency)
- Parliament of Ghana
