= Nukunu FC =

Ghanaian football club

- Full name: Nukunu Football Club
- Nickname: The Wonder Boys
- Founded: 2023
- Manager: Christian Chibueze
- League: Ghana Division One League
| Home colours colours | Away colours colours |

Nukunu Football Club, commonly known as Nukunu FC, is a Ghanaian football club based in the Ketu North Municipal District of the Volta Region, Ghana. The club was formerly known as Nukunu Sports Academy and is nicknamed "The Wonder Boys".

The club competes in the Ghana Division One League, the second tier of the Ghanaian football league system. Nukunu gained promotion to the Division One League after winning the 2026 Volta Regional Middle League.

== History ==
=== Formation and early development ===
Nukunu FC originated from the Nukunu Sports Academy, a football development project associated with founder Eric Edem Agbana. Sources identifying the club's history give 2023 as the year the football project was established.

The organisation initially operated primarily as a youth-oriented football academy, with an emphasis on identifying and developing young footballers from the Volta and Oti regions. The project subsequently progressed through the regional football structure of the Ghana Football Association.

In July 2024, Nukunu qualified for the Volta Regional Football Association Division Two League. The club entered the competition with the stated objective of progressing to the national Division One League.

=== 2025–26 season ===
In September 2025, Christian Chibueze was appointed head coach of Nukunu. Chibueze had previously worked with Home Stars FC and had experience in Ghana's regional football competitions.

Nukunu progressed through the 2025–26 Volta Regional Division Two competition and qualified for the regional Middle League. In April 2026, the club secured qualification for the Middle League after its performance in the Sub-Middle League competition.

The club received financial support during its promotion campaign. In April 2026, businessman Seth Dzamesi, through Sethport Company Limited, announced a support package valued at GH¢165,000 for the academy's participation in the regional competition.

=== Promotion to Division One ===
Nukunu reached the final of the 2026 Volta Regional Middle League, where it faced Yadzo Oti Warriors FC.

On 31 May 2026, Nukunu defeated Yadzo Oti Warriors 1–0 at the Ho Sports Stadium to win the competition and secure promotion to the Ghana Division One League.

The only goal of the match was scored by Esinu Harry following a rebound from a saved penalty. Yadzo Oti Warriors were subsequently reduced to ten players, and Nukunu held on to win the match.

The promotion represented Nukunu's first qualification for Ghana's national Division One League.

=== Rebranding ===
Following its promotion, the organisation changed its name from Nukunu Sports Academy to Nukunu Football Club. The rebranding was announced in 2026 ahead of the club's participation in the Division One League.

Club officials said the change reflected the organisation's transition from a primarily academy-based structure to a football club competing at national level, while retaining its youth-development objectives.

=== 2026–27 season ===
Nukunu began its first Division One League campaign in the 2026–27 season. The club was placed in Zone Three of the competition.

The club played its first Division One League match on 19 September 2026 against Nania FC at Nania Park. The match ended in a 0–0 draw, giving Nukunu its first point in the national second tier.

== Ownership and administration ==
Ghanaian politician Eric Edem Agbana is the founder and president of Nukunu FC.

== Coaching ==
Christian Chibueze was appointed head coach in September 2025. He subsequently guided the club during its successful 2025–26 regional campaign, which culminated in promotion to the Division One League.

== Youth development ==
Youth development has remained a central part of Nukunu's activities since its operation as Nukunu Sports Academy. Club officials have described the organisation as a platform for developing young footballers, particularly from the Volta and Oti regions.

In June 2026, the academy announced that it would support a young football enthusiast who was below its minimum recruitment age. The announced support included football equipment, school fees and learning materials until the child reached the academy's eligible age.

== Partnerships ==
In June 2026, Nukunu announced a partnership with The Hope Brand (THB). The partnership was presented as part of the club's efforts to promote football talent from the Volta Region and increase the club's visibility.

The partnership included the production of the club's home and away kits for the 2026–27 Division One League season.

In September 2026, the club also unveiled a new team bus ahead of its Division One campaign.

== Competitive record ==
| Competition | Season | Achievement |
|---|---|---|
| Volta Regional Division Two League | 2025–26 | Qualified for Middle League |
| Volta Regional Middle League | 2026 | Champions |
| Ghana Division One League | 2026–27 | Debut season |

== Honours ==
=== Regional competitions ===
Volta Regional Middle League

- Champions: 2026
