= Guan (Ghana parliament constituency) =

Constituency in Ghana

- constituency for the Parliament of Ghana
- District: Guan District
- Region: Oti Region of Ghana

Current constituency
- Created: 2020
- Party: National Democratic Congress
- MP: Fred Kwesi Agbenyo

Guan is one of the constituencies represented in the parliament of Ghana. It elects one member of parliament (MP) by the first past the post system of election. Fred Kwesi Agbenyo is the member of parliament for the constituency. Guan is located in the Oti Region of Ghana.

== Boundaries ==
The constituency is within the Guan District. To the north is the Buem in the Jasikan District. On the west of the constituency is the Biakoye constituency in the Biakoye District. The Hohoe constituency in the Volta Region is to the south. The eastern border is with Togo.

== History ==
The constituency was created in 2020 by the Electoral Commission of Ghana. It was dubbed the "Virgin Constituency" because it was without an MP. The first MP was elected in the 2024 Ghanaian general election. The constituency includes the people of Santrokofi, Akpafu, Likpe and Lolobi Traditional areas in the Oti Region.

First elected	Member	Party
Created in 2020
2024	Fred Kwesi Agbenyo	National Democratic Congress

== Elections ==
2024 Ghanaian general election: Guan
Party	Candidate	Votes	%	±%
NDC	Fred Kwesi Agbenyo	9,963	76.87	—
NPP	Michael Osibo	2,998	23.13	—
NDP	Sussie Sekor	0	0.00	—
Majority		6,965	53.74	—
Turnout		13,164		—
Registered electors				—
