= Samuel Adu Gyamfi =

Ghanaian politician and educationalist

Samuel Adu Gyamfi is a Ghanaian politician and an educationalist. He was a member of the 4th Parliament of the 4th Republic of Ghana for the Aowin Constituency in Western Region of Ghana.

== Early life and education ==
Samuel Adu Gyamfi was born on 24 November 1954. He obtained a master's degree in education at the University of Cape Coast and a Master of Arts in pedagogy at the same university.

== Politics ==
Samuel began his political career as a member of parliament in 2005 after he emerged winner at the 2004 Ghanaian General Elections. He was the first person to represent his constituency after it was established in 2004. He was elected into the 4th parliament of the 4th Republic of Ghana on 7 December 2004 on the ticket of the New Patriotic Party. He won with 22,059 representing 56.20% out of the total valid votes, he defeated John Kwekucher Ackah of the National Democratic Congress who gained 16,358 representing 41.70% of the total votes and Ebenezer Ebb Kwaku Bankwa of the People's National Convention with 854 votes representing 2.20% of the total votes. However, during the 2008 Ghanaian general elections he lost the seat to Mathias Kwame Ntow of the National Democratic Congress. In 2019, awards organised by the Pan- African Heroes of change in collaboration with the Bureau of Research on Governance Commerce and Administration (BORGCA), named Gyamfi as the best Municipal Chief Executive for the Aowin constituency.

== Personal life ==
He is a Christian.

== See also ==
- Aowin (Ghana Parliamentary Constituency)
- List of MPs elected in the 2004 Ghanaian Parliamentary elections
