= Mahama Tiah Abdul-Kabiru =

Ghanaian politician and Member of Parliament

Hon. Abdul Kabiru Tiah Mahama (PhD) MP

Member of Parliament for Walewale
- Incumbent
- Assumed office 7 January 2025

Personal details
- Born: September 1, 1988 (age 38) Janga, Ghana
- Party: New Patriotic Party
- Education: Hiroshima University; University for Development Studies; Mountcrest University College; American Academy of Financial Management; Nalerigu Secondary School
- Occupation: Economist, Politician

Abdul Kabiru Tiah Mahama (born 1 September 1988) is a Ghanaian politician and economist. He is the Member of Parliament for the Walewale Constituency in the North East Region of Ghana. He represents the New Patriotic Party (NPP) in the Parliament of Ghana.

== Early life and education ==
Mahama was born in Janga, Ghana. He completed his Senior Secondary School Certificate Examination (SSCE) at Nalerigu Secondary School in 2005. He holds a Bachelor of Arts degree in economics from the University for Development Studies (2010), a Master of Philosophy in Development Studies from the same university (2014), and a Doctor of Philosophy degree from Hiroshima University in Japan, completed in 2018. He also earned a Chartered Economist certificate from the American Academy of Financial Management in 2015, and a bachelor's degree in law (LLB) from Mountcrest University College in 2024.

== Career ==
Mahama has held several positions in both academia and public service. He served as a Program Education and Advocacy Officer at NORSAAC, a civil society organization, and later worked as a researcher at Hiroshima University. Upon returning to Ghana, he served as a Technical Economic Advisor and subsequently as Director of Economic Analysis for the Government of Ghana. In the 2024 general elections, he was elected to the Parliament of Ghana on the ticket of the New Patriotic Party to represent the Walewale Constituency. This is his first term in Parliament. He currently serves on the Information and Communications Committee and the Finance Committee.

== Personal life ==
He is a practicing Muslim.

== See also ==
- List of MPs elected in the 2024 Ghanaian general election
- New Patriotic Party
- Parliament of Ghana
