= Gloria Owusu =

Ghanaian politician

Hon. Gloria Owusu MP

Member of Parliament for Trobu Constituency
- Incumbent
- Assumed office 7 January 2025

Personal details
- Born: April 22, 1986 (age 40) Adwumakaase, Ghana
- Party: New Patriotic Party
- Occupation: Politician, Business Executive

Gloria Owusu (born 22 April 1986) is a Ghanaian politician and business executive. She is a member of the New Patriotic Party (NPP) and currently serves as the Member of Parliament for the Trobu Constituency in the 9th Parliament of Ghana.

== Early life and education ==
Gloria Owusu hails from Adwumakaase in the Ashanti Region of Ghana. She pursued her tertiary education at Charisma Bible College, where she obtained a diploma in April 2011.

== Career ==
Before entering politics, Gloria Owusu served as the managing director of Glotex Company Limited, a private enterprise. She was elected to the Parliament of Ghana in the 2024 general elections on the ticket of the New Patriotic Party and represents the Trobu Constituency in the Greater Accra Region. In Parliament, she is a member of the Information and Communications Committee, the Public Administration and State Interests Committee, and serves as the Vice Chairperson of the Backbenchers' Business Committee.
