= Haruna Seidu =

Ghanaian politician

Hon. Alhaji Haruna Seidu
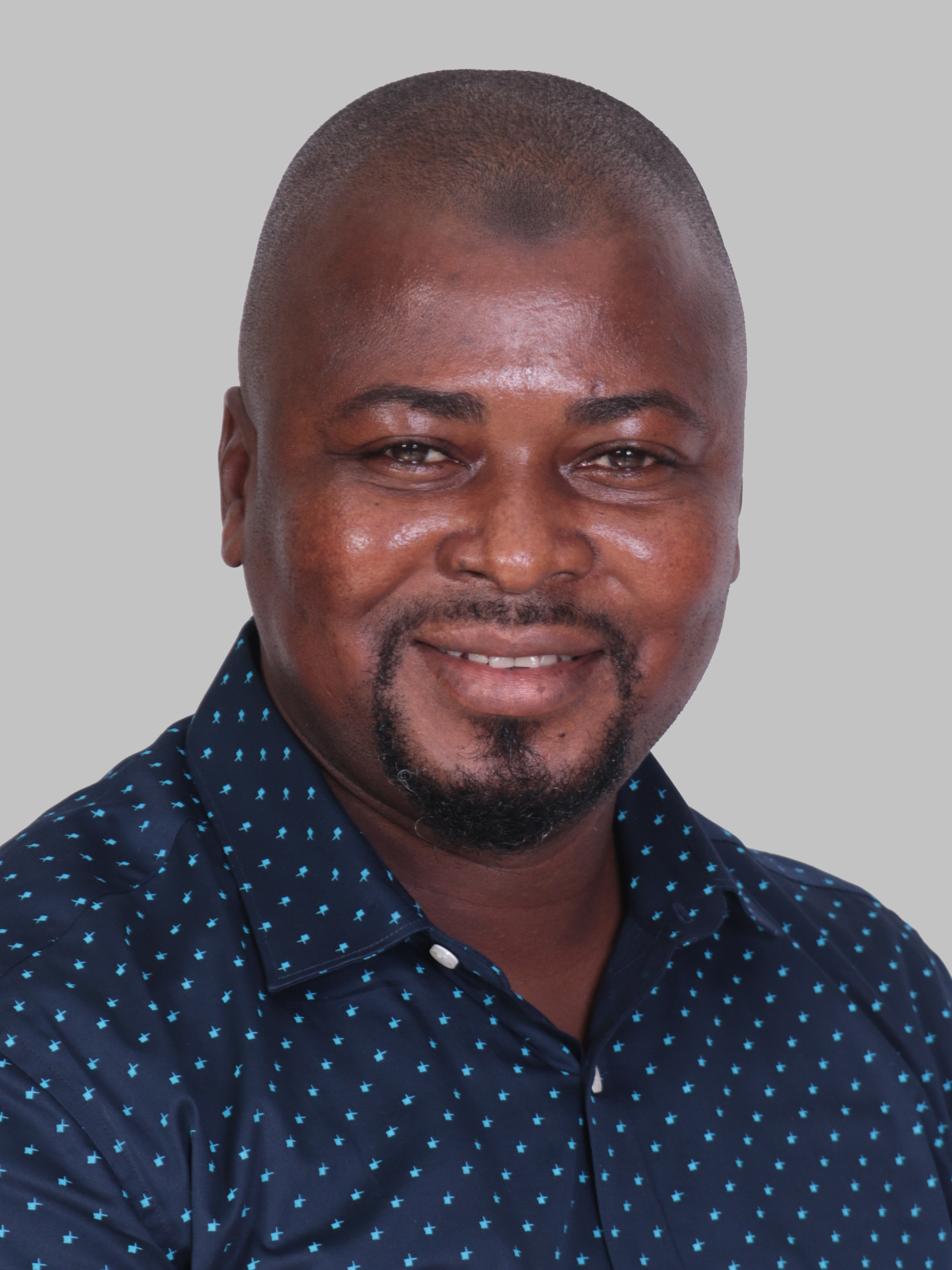

Member of Parliament for Wenchi Constituency
- Incumbent
- Assumed office 7 January 2021
- Preceded by: George Gyan-Baffour

Personal details
- Born: Haruna Seidu; 4 February 1974 (age 52) Wenchi, Ghana
- Party: National Democratic Congress (Ghana)
- Occupation: Politician
- Profession: Marketer/ Administrative manager
- Committees: Special Budget Committee

Alhaji Haruna Seidu is a Ghanaian politician and member of parliament for the Wenchi constituency in the Bono region of Ghana.

== Early life and education ==
Haruna was born on 4 February 1974 and hails from Wenchi in the Bono region of Ghana. He had his Masters in Business Administration in Marketing in 2015.

== Career ==
Haruna was the Marketing and Administrative Manager for Lamini Investment Ghana Limited. He is a farmer.

=== Political career ===
Haruna is a member of NDC and currently the MP for Wenchi Constituency. He won the parliamentary seat with 26,068 votes making 51.1% of the total vote whilst the NPP parliamentary candidate George Yaw Gyan-Baffuor had 23,102 votes making 45.3% of the total votes.

=== Committee ===
Haruna is a member of the Special Budget Committee.

== Personal life ==
Haruna is a Muslim.

== Philanthropy ==
In January 2022, he donated 36 new wheelchairs to some PWDs in the Wenchi Municipal.
