= George Gyan-Baffour =

Ghanaian politician (born 1951)

Hon. George Gyan-Baffour MP

Member of Parliament for Wenchi Constituency
- In office 7 January 2017 – 6 January 2021
- President: Nana Akufo-Addo
- In office 7 January 2013 – 6 January 2017
- President: John Mahama
- In office 7 January 2009 – 6 January 2013
- President: John Atta Mills; John Mahama
- In office 7 January 2005 – 6 January 2009
- President: John Kufuor

Personal details
- Born: George Yaw Gyan-Baffour; 27 March 1951 (age 75)
- Party: New Patriotic Party
- Children: 7
- Education: University of Ghana; Helsinki School of Economics; University of Wisconsin, Madison; Harvard University
- Profession: Economist; Banker; Insurer
- Committees: Special Budget Committee; Trade Industry and Tourism Committee; Standing Orders Committee

George Yaw Gyan-Baffour (born 27 March 1951) is a Ghanaian development economist and politician. He is a former Member of Parliament who represented Wenchi constituency from 2005 to 2021. He was a professor at Howard University in Washington, D.C., from 1993 to 2001. He is a member of the New Patriotic Party and the former Minister of Planning in Ghana.

== Early life and education ==
Gyan-Baffour was born in Wenchi in the Brong Ahafo Region of Ghana. He attended the University of Ghana where he graduated with a Bachelor of Arts degree in economics. He proceeded to Helsinki School of Economics in Finland where he obtained a Diploma in Economics. He later obtained his master's degree and Doctor of Philosophy degrees after enrolling at University of Wisconsin, Madison. He also has a post doctoral diploma from Harvard University.

== Working life ==
George Gyan-Baffour was a professor of management at Howard University from 1993 to 2001. Upon the election victory of the New Patriotic Party in Ghanaian general election in 2000, he returned to Ghana and was appointed by President John Kufour as the Director General of the National Development Planning Commission in 2002. It was during this time that he established the first system for overseeing and assessing the rate of national development. He oversaw the development of the Coordinated Program for the Economic and Social Development of Ghana.

== Political life ==
He resigned from the position in 2004 so he could pursue his political ambitions. That year, he contested the Wenchi constituency parliamentary election on the ticket of the New Patriotic Party. He won the election and went on to win the three subsequent elections in 2008, 2012 and 2016. He was appointed a Deputy Minister for Finance and Economic Planning from March 2005 to December 2008 by President Kufour.

In 2015, he publicly opposed the Mahama administration's plan to seek a government bailout from the International Monetary Fund. He believed that the solution to the then economic difficulty the country was going through could be resolved by accessing loans internally.

=== 2004 elections ===
Gyan-Baffour was first elected as the Member of Parliament for the Wenchi constituency after it was created from the then Wenchi East and Wenchi West constituencies. He was elected in the 2004 Ghanaian general elections. He thus represented the constituency in the 4th parliament of the 4th republic of Ghana. He was elected with 18,183 votes out of 33,806 total valid votes cast. This was equivalent to 53.8% of total valid votes cast. He was elected over Abdul-Latif Umar Abdullah of the Convention People's Party, Alhaji Alhassan Bene of the Every Ghanaian Living Everywhere Party and Osei Kwadwo Hayford an independent candidate. These obtained 1,286votes, 7,669votes and 6,668 votes respectively of the total valid votes cast. These were equivalent to 3.8%, 22.7% and 19.7% of total valid votes cast. Gyan-Baffour in that election won on the ticket of the New Patriotic Party. His constituency was a part of 14 parliamentary seats out of a total 24 seats won by the New Patriotic Party in the Brong Ahafo Region of Ghana. In all, the New Patriotic Party won a majority total of 128 parliamentary representation out of a total 230 seats in the 4th parliament of the 4th republic of Ghana.

=== 2008 elections ===
Gyan-Baffour was re-elected as the Member of Parliament for the Wenchi constituency in the 2008 Ghanaian general elections. He thus represented the constituency again in the 5th parliament of the 4th republic of Ghana. He was elected with 18,516votes out of 32,573total valid votes cast. This was equivalent to 56.84% of the total valid votes cast. He was elected over Yaw Osei Agyei of the National Democratic Congress, Akotia Kwaky Thompson of the Democratic Freedom Party and Abdul-Latif Omaru Abdullay of the Convention People's Party. These obtained 13,495votes, 284 votes and 278votes respectively of the total valid votes cast. This was equivalent to 41.43%, 0.87% and 0.85% of total valid votes cast. Gyan-Baffour was elected on the ticket of the New Patriotic Party. His constituency was a part of 16 parliamentary seats out of a total 24 seats won by the New Patriotic Party in that election in the Brong Ahafo Region of Ghana. In all the New Patriotic Party won a minority total of 107 parliamentary representation out of 230 seats in the 5th parliament of the 4th republic of Ghana.

=== 2012 elections ===
During the 2012 parliamentary elections, Gyan-Baffour obtained 50.83% of all valid votes by defeating Yaw Osei Agyei of the National Democratic Congress, Ebenezer Gyimah Koomson of the Progressive Peoples' Party and Jacob Steve Kojo Akasampah Gyan of the National Democratic Party.

=== Parliamentary committees ===
Being an economist, Gyan-Baffour has mainly sat on parliamentary committees that relate to his field. They include: Special Budget Committee; Trade, Industry and Tourism Committee; Education Committee; Poverty Reduction Committee; and acting chair of the Special Budget Committee.

== Ministerial appointment ==
On 12 January 2017, President Nana Akuffo-Addo nominated him as minister designate for planning. The President called him a "respected economist with the right expertise as former head of the National Development Planning Commission". He was charged with translating the New Patriotic Party's election manifesto into workable, achievable targets for national development.

=== Vetting and swearing in ===
He was vetted by the Appointments Committee of Parliament in February 2017. During his vetting, he told the committee that Ghana did not need a 40-year development plan as it promotes rigidity. In his view a plan that was less lengthy would be better and help avoid any restrictions that would be inimical to Ghana's development. He was approved by the committee after satisfying all requirements needed for a minister of state. He was sworn in by the President Akuffo-Addo on 11 February 2017.

== Memberships and affiliations ==
Gyan-Baffour is a fellow of the Institute of Chartered Economists of Ghana. He has been a board member of various Government of Ghana agencies including the Bank of Ghana, Council for Scientific and Industrial Research and the Ghana Institute of Management and Public Administration.

== Personal life ==
George Gyan-Baffour is married with seven children. He is a member of the Catholic Church in Ghana.
