= Mohammed Issah Bataglia =

Ghanaian politician, MP for Sissala East

Hon. Mohammed Issah Bataglia MP

Member of Parliament for Sissala East Constituency
- Incumbent
- Assumed office 7 January 2025
- Preceded by: Amidu Issahaku Chinnia

Personal details
- Born: Bugubelle, Sissala East, Upper West Region, Ghana
- Party: National Democratic Congress
- Profession: Politician, Community development advocate
- Committees: Trade, Industry and Tourism; Public Accounts

Mohammed Issah Bataglia (born 20 November 1978) is a Ghanaian politician and Member of Parliament for the Sissala East Constituency in the Upper West Region, representing the National Democratic Congress (NDC) in the Ninth Parliament of the Fourth Republic of Ghana.

== Early life and education ==
Bataglia was born on 20 November 1978 and hails from Bugubelle, a town in the Sissala East District of the Upper West Region of Ghana. He is a practicing Muslim.

He attended Tumu Secondary Technical School, completing his SSSCE in 1998, followed by teacher training at Tumu Teacher Training College, where he earned a Teacher's Certificate "A" in 2002.

He later obtained a Bachelor of Business Administration (BBA) from the Islamic University College, Accra in 2008 and pursued legal studies at the University of Professional Studies, Accra, where he completed a Bachelor of Laws (LLB) in 2020 and an MPhil in Leadership in 2015.

In 2024, he completed a Master of Laws (LLM) in Corporate and Commercial Law at the University of Ghana. He also received executive education in Making Data-Driven Decisions from the Massachusetts Institute of Technology (MIT) Schwarzman College of Computing in 2002.

== Career ==
Before entering Parliament, Bataglia held various roles across the public, private, and non-profit sectors. He served as an Administrative Liaison Officer at the Office of the President, Country Director of the Virtue Foundation, and Managing Director of SAS Capital Micro-Credit Ltd. He also worked as a classroom teacher with the Ghana Education Service and previously as a machine operator at Miniplast Ghana Ltd. In addition to these roles, he was involved in community development efforts, particularly in areas related to renewable energy and rural infrastructure.

=== Politics ===
Bataglia was elected as the NDC parliamentary candidate for Sissala East in May 2023. He contested the 2024 general election and won the seat with 21,621 votes, defeating incumbent MP Amidu Issahaku Chinnia of the New Patriotic Party (NPP), who received 10,789 votes. He was sworn into Parliament on 7 January 2025.

=== Parliamentary initiatives ===
Bataglia is a member of the following parliamentary committees:

- Trade, Industry and Tourism Committee
- Subsidiary Legislation Committee

In 2025, the Betway Tumu Cup, a football competition involving local youth, was held in the constituency, with Bataglia among those involved in its organization. He facilitated the donation of solar power equipment to the Komo CHPS compound.

He has described drug abuse among constituents as a ''national security threat,” urging traditional leaders and law enforcement to unite against its spread.

In February 2025, Bataglia stated that part of the District Assembly Common Fund would be directed toward upgrading laboratory facilities and improving health services in the municipality.

In 2025, Bataglia introduced Bataglia Educational Support Scheme (BESS). A drive founded by Hon. Issah Mohammed Bataglia, is seeking to promote educational opportunities and skills development through support for people pursuing education and vocational training.

The guiding principles for BESS are "Opportunity Through Education and Skills" the initiative seeks to place education and skills acquisition as important tools for personal development and improved livelihoods. within the Sissala East Municipality.
