= Moses Anim =

Ghanaian politician

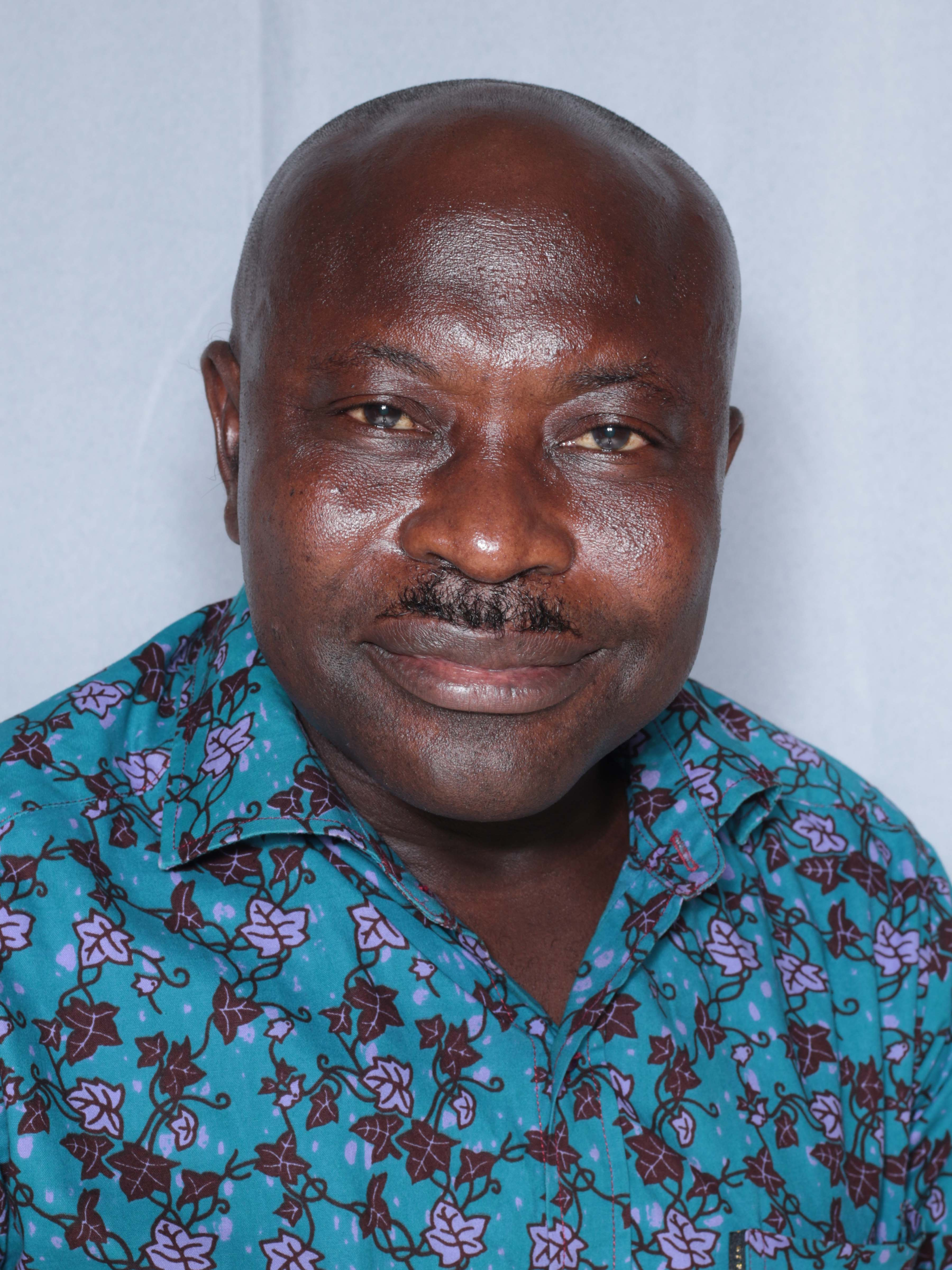

Member of the Ghana Parliament for Trobu Constituency
- Incumbent
- Assumed office 7 January 2013
- Preceded by: Constituency split

Personal details
- Born: April 25, 1965 (age 61)
- Party: New Patriotic Party
- Education: Nkawkaw Senior High School, University of Ghana

Moses Anim is a Ghanaian politician and member of the Seventh Parliament of the Fourth Republic of Ghana representing the Trobu Constituency in the Greater Accra Region on the ticket of the New Patriotic Party.

== Early life and education ==
Anim was born on 25 April 1965. He hails from Adukrom in the Eastern Region of Ghana. He studied at the University of Ghana where he obtained his Bachelor of Science degree Biochemistry and his Master of Business Administration degree in Project Management in 1991 and 2005 respectively.

== Career ==
Prior to entering politics, Anim was the Project Manager of Wilhelm Construction Company Limited in Accra.

== Politics ==
Anim entered parliament on 7 January 2013 on the ticket of the New Patriotic Party representing the Trobu Constituency. Out of the 76,782 valid votes cast, he polled 46,446 votes (58.96%) to win the seat. He was re-elected in 2016 to remain in parliament for another four (4)-year term.He was re-elected once again in 2020 after a tough battle when an independent candidate known as Vida Oppong challenged him for the seat. She is considered by the general public as his toughest opponent since the beginning of his tenure.

In the parliamentary primaries of 2024 for the NPP, he was defeated in his attempt to represent the party by Gloria Owusu. Gloria secured 698 votes, surpassing her opponent who received 641 votes out of the total valid votes cast.

== Personal life ==
He identifies as a Christian and a member of the Church of Pentecost.
