= Susana Adam =

Ghanaian politician

Hon. Susana Adam

Member of the Ghana Parliament for West Mamprusi
- In office 1997–2001
- Preceded by: Ben Baluri Saibu
- Succeeded by: Issifu Asumah

Personal details
- Born: Ghana
- Party: National Democratic Congress

Susana Adam is a Ghanaian politician who served as the member of parliament for the West Mamprusi constituency from 1997 to 2001.

She contested for the West Mamprusi seat on the ticket of the National Democratic Congress (NDC) during the 1996 parliamentary election and won polling 23,021 votes which represented 63% of the entire votes cast. During the 2000 parliamentary election, she lost the seat to Issifu Asumah of the People's National Convention (PNC). She polled 12,735 votes (37.3%) as against Asumah's 18,907 votes (55.4%). In 2004, even though she had gained considerable endorsement from the NDC party faithful prior to the general election, Alidu Iddrisu Zakari represented the party to contest for the then newly created Walewale East seat. Zakari consequently defeated Issifu Asumah for the seat in the 2004 parliamentary election.

== See also ==
- 1996 parliamentary election
- Walewale (Ghana parliament constituency)
