= Alex Tetteh Djornobuah =

Ghanaian politician (born 1972)

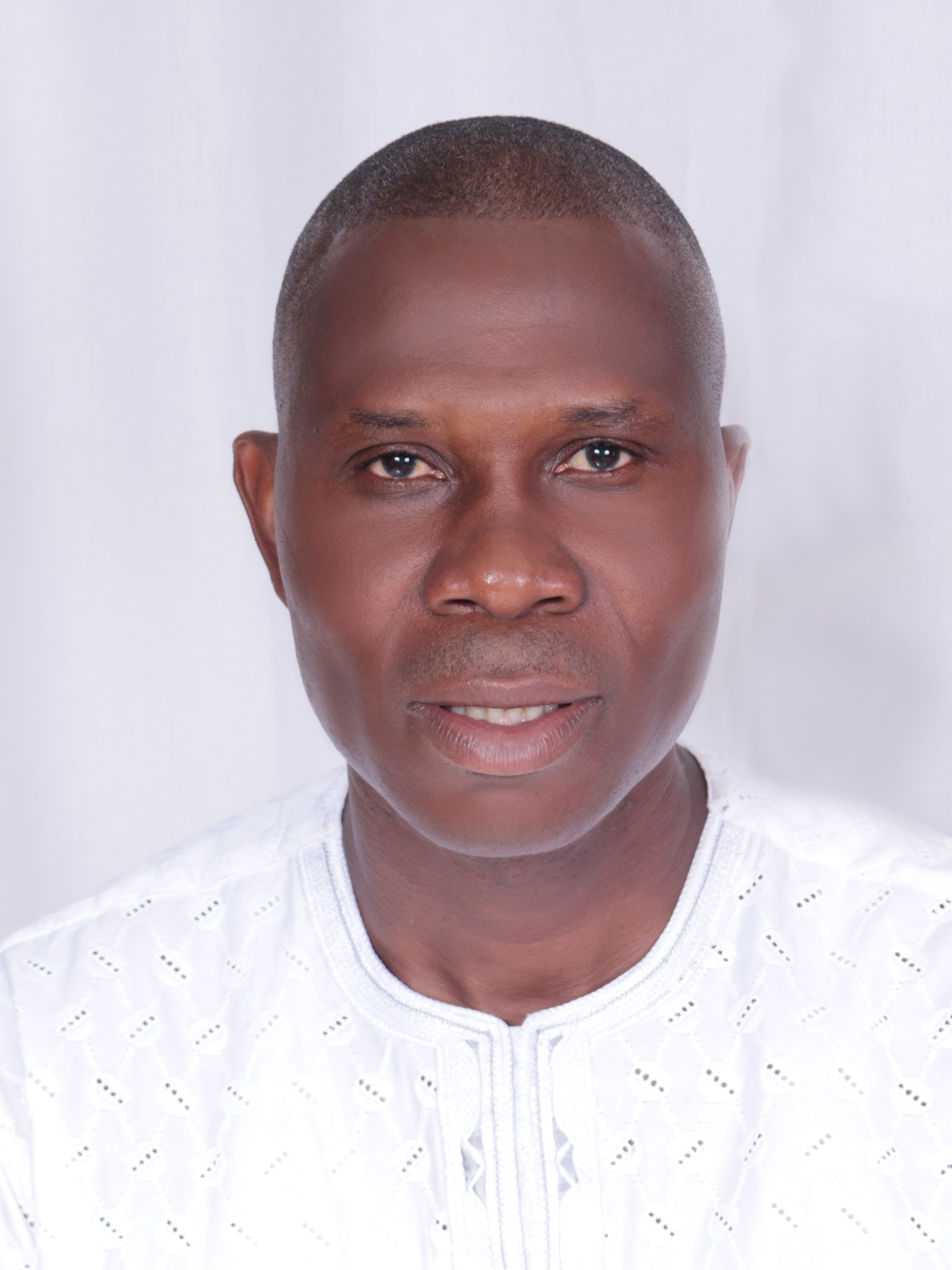

Member of the Ghana Parliament for Sefwi-Akontombra constituency

Personal details
- Born: 27 April 1972 (age 54)
- Party: New Patriotic Party

Alex Tetteh Djornobuah (born 27 April 1972) is a Ghanaian politician. He is a deputy minister for Western North and member of the Seventh Parliament of the Fourth Republic of Ghana representing the Sefwi-Akontombra Constituency in the Western North Region on the ticket of the New Patriotic Party.

He lobbied for the construction of the Wiawso-Akontombra road, which the previous government had abandoned.

== Politics ==
Alex Tetteh Djornobuah is a member of the New Patriotic Party, representing Sefwi-Akontombra constituency in the Seventh and Eighth Parliament of the Fourth Republic of Ghana.

=== 2016 election ===
Djornobuah contested the Sefwi-Akontombra constituency parliamentary seat on the ticket of the New Patriotic Party during the 2016 Ghanaian general election and won with 11,922 votes representing 42.98% of the total votes. He was elected over Kenneth Yeboah of the National Democratic Congress, who polled 11,626 votes, equivalent to 41.92% of the total, Independent parliamentary candidate Herod Cobbina had 4,108 votes, representing 14.81% of all votes polled, and the parliamentary candidate for the Convention People's Party Awini Salifu had 81 votes, representing 0.29% of the total votes.

==== 2020 election ====
Djornobuah was re-elected as a member of parliament for the Sefwi-Akontombra constituency on the ticket of New Patriotic Party during the 2020 Ghanaian general election with 17,976 votes representing 54.88% of the total votes over Issah Mumuni of the National Democratic Congress, who polled 14,553 votes which is equivalent to 44.43%, and the GUM parliamentary candidate Bright Ofori had 224 votes, representing 0.68% of the total votes.
