= Pious Kwame Nkuah =

Ghanaian politician

Hon. Pious Kwame Nkuah

Member of Parliament for Sefwi Akontombra Constituency
- Incumbent
- Assumed office 7 January 2025
- President: John Dramani Mahama

Personal details
- Born: November 21, 1976 (age 49) Sefwi Akontombra, Western North Region, Ghana
- Party: National Democratic Congress
- Education: Kumasi Technical University; Kwame Nkrumah University of Science and Technology
- Profession: Engineer, Politician
- Committees: Defence and Interior Committee; Backbenchers' Business Committee

Pious Kwame Nkuah (born 21 November 1976) is a Ghanaian politician and a member of the ninth Parliament of the Fourth Republic of Ghana, representing the Sefwi Akontombra Constituency in the Western North Region. He is affiliated with the National Democratic Congress (NDC).

== Early life and education ==
He was born on 21 November 1976 in Sefwi Akontombra, located in the Western North Region of Ghana. He completed his Senior Secondary School Certificate Examination (SSSCE) in 1996 at T.I. Ahmadiyya Senior High School in Kumasi. He obtained a Higher National Diploma (HND) in Mechanical Engineering from Kumasi Technical University in 2001. He later pursued further education at the Kwame Nkrumah University of Science and Technology (KNUST), earning a Bachelor’s degree in Materials Engineering in 2009 and a Master of Philosophy (MPhil) in Environmental Resources and Management in 2018.

== Career ==
Nkuah began his professional career as a metallurgist intern at Anglogold Bibiani Limited. He later worked as a teacher under the Ghana Education Service. He has also held various public sector roles, including District Director at the Youth Employment Agency and District Chief Executive for the Sefwi Akontombra District Assembly under the Ministry of Local Government and Rural Development. In addition, he served as an environmental and safety supervisor at Intermerc Ghana Limited.

=== Political career ===
Nkuah was elected as the Member of Parliament for the Sefwi Akontombra Constituency in the 2020 general election on the ticket of the National Democratic Congress (NDC). He currently serves in the 9th Parliament of the Fourth Republic of Ghana. In Parliament, he is a member of the Defence and Interior Committee and the Backbenchers' Business Committee. His areas of interest include rural development, youth employment, and environmental sustainability. As a representative of a predominantly rural constituency, he has been involved in efforts to improve access to education, healthcare, and infrastructure within the Western North Region.
