= Abdul Rauf Tubazu =

Ghanaian politician

Abdul Rauf Tongym Tubazu is a Ghanaian politician and the Member of Parliament-elect for the Ayawaso Central Constituency in the Greater Accra Region of Ghana.

== Political career ==
Tubazu is a member of the National Democratic Congress.

In the 2020 Ghanaian general election, he lost to Henry Quartey after securing 28,363 votes whiles Quartey had 33,003 votes of the total valid 62,284 votes cast.

In the 2024 National Democratic Congress Primaries, he won the bid to contest for the Ayawaso Central Constituency parliamentary seat by beating Sophia Karen Ackuaku. He secured 797 votes which represented 51.56% of the total votes cast. In the 2024 Ghanaian general election, he defeated Henry Quartey. He secured 29,755 votes whilst Quartey had 23,345; Charles Kwame Adams representing the National Democratic Party (NDP) had 163 votes out of the total 53,550 cast.

== Personal life ==
Tubazu is a Bissa by tribe.
