= Oscar Ofori Larbi =

Ghanaian politicians

Hon Oscar Ofori Larbi
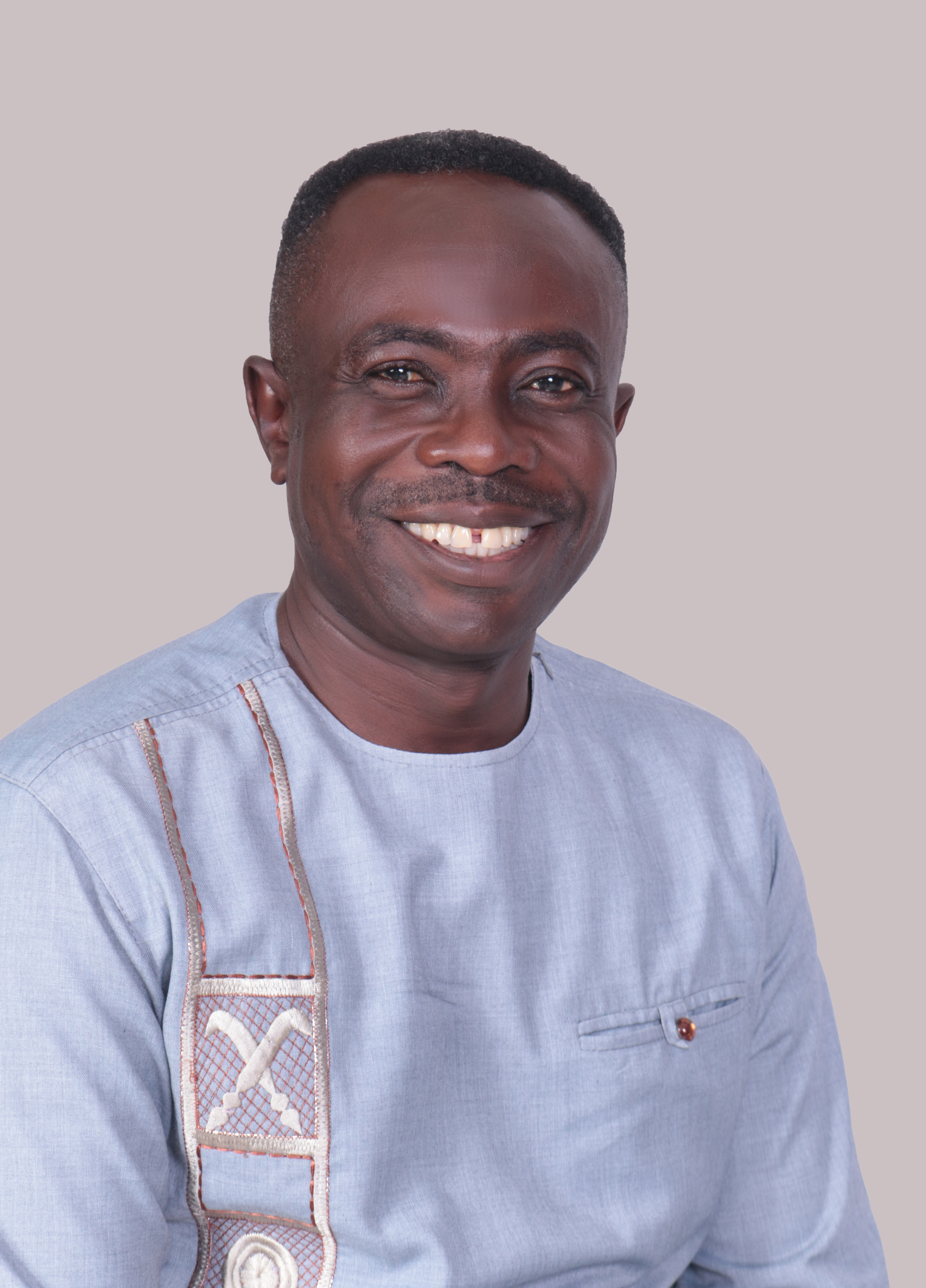

Member of the Ghana Parliament for Aowin Constituency
- Incumbent
- Assumed office 7 January 2021

Personal details
- Born: Oscar Ofori Larbi; 14 September 1966 (age 59) Adukrom
- Party: National Democratic Congress
- Occupation: Politician
- Committees: Members Holding Offices of Profit Committee, Food, Agriculture and Cocoa Affairs Committee

Oscar Ofori Larbi (born 14 September 1966) is a Ghanaian politician and member of the National Democratic Congress. He is the member of parliament for the Aowin Constituency, in the Western North Region of Ghana.

== Early life and education ==
Larbi hails from Adukrom. He holds a certificate in Public administration. He completed an advanced diploma at Cambridge International College in March 2012

== Personal life ==
Oscar Ofori Larbi is a christian.
