= Alhassan Abdul-Fatawu =

Ghanaian Politician

Hon. Abdul-Fatawu Alhassan

Member of Parliament for Yendi
- Incumbent
- Assumed office 7 January 2025
- President: John Dramani Mahama

Personal details
- Born: November 25, 1982 (age 43) Yendi, Ghana
- Party: National Democratic Congress (NDC)
- Education: University of Ghana; Ghana School of Law; Ghana Institute of Management and Public Administration; Yendi Senior High School
- Occupation: Politician, Lawyer

Abdul-Fatawu Alhassan (born 25 November 1982) is a Ghanaian lawyer and politician. He is the Member of Parliament for the Yendi Constituency in the Northern Region of Ghana. He was elected on the ticket of the National Democratic Congress (NDC) during the 2024 general elections and assumed office in January 2025.

== Early life and education ==
Alhassan was born in Yendi in the Northern Region of Ghana. He attended Yendi Senior High School and completed his Senior Secondary School Certificate Examination (SSSCE) in 2004. He pursued a Bachelor of Arts degree at the University of Ghana, graduating in 2009. He later obtained a Bachelor of Laws degree from the Ghana Institute of Management and Public Administration (GIMPA) in 2017 and an LL.B from the Ghana School of Law in 2019. He completed a Master of Laws (LL.M) degree at the University of Ghana, in 2024.

== Career ==
Before entering Parliament, Alhassan held various legal and administrative roles. He served as a Principal Administrative Assistant at the University for Development Studies and later became the Managing Partner at Fatawu Jofa @ Law. He also worked as a Regulatory Compliance Advisor at Scancom Plc. Alhassan contested and won the Yendi parliamentary seat in the 2024 general elections on the ticket of the National Democratic Congress and began his first term in Parliament in January 2025. He currently serves as a member of the Education Committee and the Backbenchers' Business Committee.
