= Ntebe Ayo William =

Ghanaian politician

Hon. Ntebe Ayo William

Member of Parliament for Tatale-Sanguli
- Incumbent
- Assumed office 7 January 2025
- President: John Mahama

Personal details
- Born: December 24, 1963 (age 62) Tatale, Ghana
- Party: National Democratic Congress (NDC)
- Education: Westchester Community College; Nyack College
- Occupation: Politician, Educator

Ntebe Ayo William (born 24 December 1963) is a Ghanaian politician and educator. He is the Member of Parliament for the Tatale-Sanguli Constituency in the Northern Region of Ghana. He was elected on the ticket of the National Democratic Congress (NDC) in the 2024 general elections and assumed office in January 2025.

== Early life and education ==
Ntebe Ayo William hails from Tatale in the Northern Region of Ghana. He completed his O Level education at St. Charles Minor Seminary in March 1987. He later pursued a diploma at Westchester Community College, completing it in March 2006, and earned a degree from Nyack College in April 2013.

== Career ==
Before entering Parliament, William worked as a pupil teacher in several schools, including Gukruli R.C Primary School, Paichado D.A Primary School, and Tatale JHS. He also served as the Secretary of the Zabzugu-Tatale Konkomba Youth Association and as Deputy Organizer for the Tatale Branch of the National Democratic Congress (NDC). Additionally, he worked as a Special Aide to John Jagri Kokpahi, the former Member of Parliament for Zabzugu-Tatale. During his time in the United States, William was employed as a Nursing Assistant at A&A Health Care Services and Westchester Medical Center, and also worked as a driver for Black Car Service. He later returned to Ghana and engaged in poultry farming as a self-employed entrepreneur. In the 2024 general elections, William contested and won the Tatale-Sanguli parliamentary seat on the ticket of the NDC and began his first term in Parliament in January 2025. He currently serves as a member of the Trade, Industry and Tourism Committee and the Committee of Selection.

== Personal life ==
William identifies with the Northern religious tradition.
