= Yves Hanson-Nortey =

Ghanaian politician

Hon. Yves Hanson-Nortey
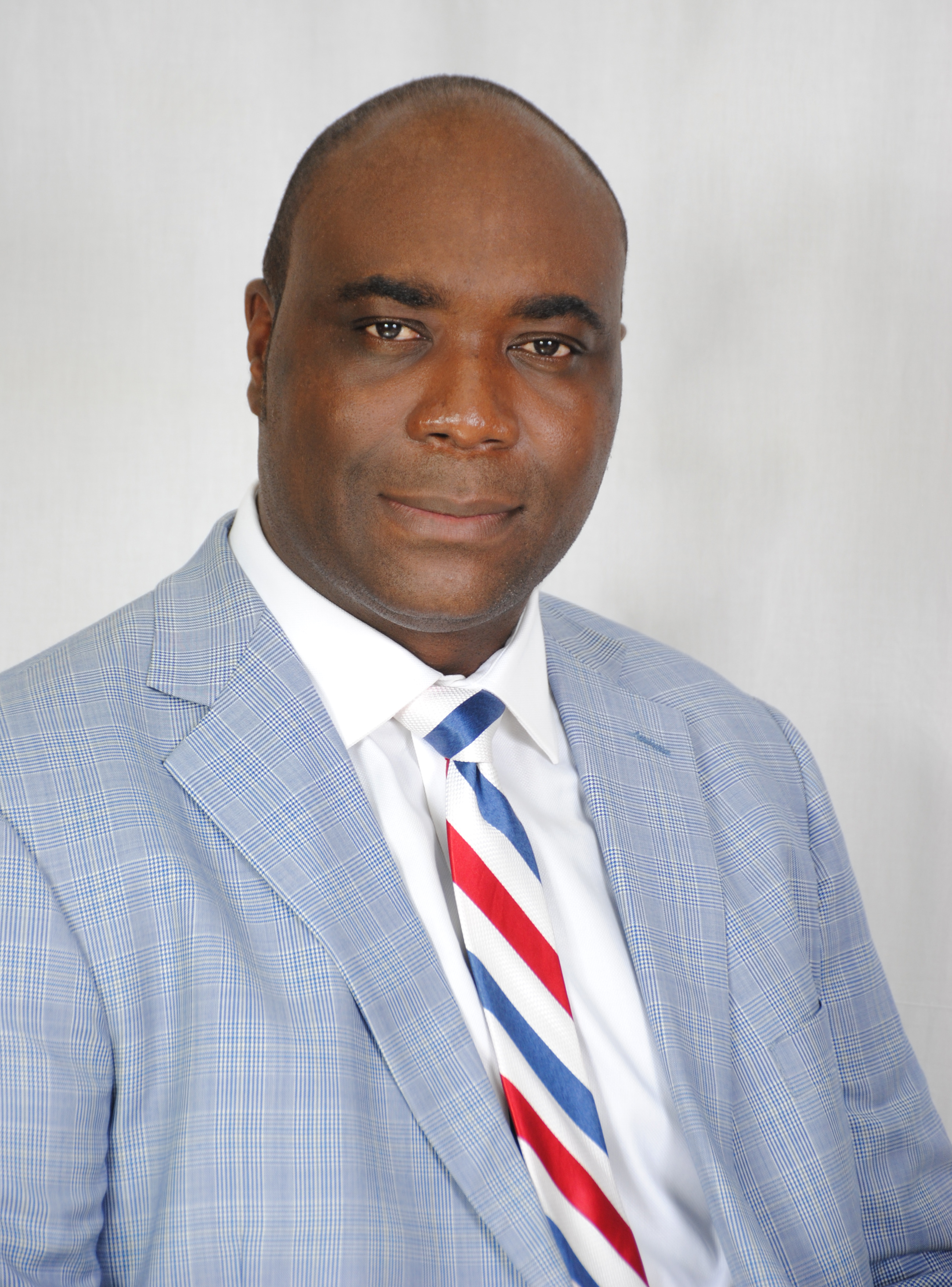

Member of Parliament for Tema Central constituency
- Incumbent
- Assumed office 7 January 2021

Personal details
- Party: New Patriotic Party

Yves Hanson-Nortey (born 20 April 1983) is a Ghanaian politician and member of the New Patriotic Party. He represents Tema Central Constituency in the 8th parliament of the 4th Republic in Ghana.

== Early life and education ==
Hanson-Nortey was born on 20 April 1983. He hails from Takoradi in the Western Region of Ghana. He obtained a Bachelor of Arts in Political Science in 2006.

== Career ==
He serves as the Managing director for Apex Petroleum Ghana.

== Political career ==
Hanson-Nortey was elected member of parliament for Tema Central constituency in the 2020 Ghanaian general elections. He won by pulling 31,121 votes, representing, 65.04% of total votes cast. He is the vice chairperson of the Environment, Science and Technology Committee at 8th parliament.

In the parliamentary primaries of 2024 for the NPP, he was defeated in his attempt to represent the party by Charles Forson. Forson secured 420 votes, surpassing his opponent who received 288 votes out of the total valid votes cast.

== Personal life ==
He is a Christian.
