= Sebastian Fred Deh =

Ghanaian politician

Hon. Sebastian Fred Deh MP

Member of Parliament for Kpando Constituency
- Incumbent
- Assumed office 7 January 2025
- Preceded by: Adjoa Della Sowah

Personal details
- Born: April 27, 1967 (age 59) Kpando Dzoanti, Volta Region, Ghana
- Party: National Democratic Congress
- Education: University of Ghana; University of Reading; Giordano Dell’ Institute, Italy
- Profession: Politician, Banker, Development expert

Sebastian Fred Deh (born 27 April 1967) is a Ghanaian politician and Member of Parliament for the Kpando Constituency in the Volta Region of Ghana. He represents the National Democratic Congress (NDC) in the 9th Parliament of the Fourth Republic of Ghana.

== Early life and education ==
Deh hails from Kpando Dzoanti in the Volta Region. He earned a BSc (Hons) in Agriculture from the University of Ghana in 1994, a Postgraduate Certificate in Micro-Enterprise Finance from the University of Reading in 1999, and a master's degree in Banking and Finance from Giordano Dell’ Institute in Italy in 2001.

== Career ==
Before entering politics, Deh worked in Ghana's education, banking, and development sectors. He served as executive director of the council for Technical and Vocational Education and Training (COTVET) under the Ministry of Education, Divisional Head at Energy Bank Ghana, and Head of Corporate Business at UBA Ghana. He was also Chief of Party at the U.S. African Development Foundation (USAIDF) and executive director at the Headhands Foundation. In June 2025, he was appointed Chairman of the Governing Council of the Ghana TVET Service.

== Political career ==
Deh contested and won the 2024 National Democratic Congress (NDC) parliamentary primaries in the Kpando Constituency, defeating incumbent MP Della Sowah. He was subsequently elected in the 2024 general election with 18,326 votes (73.56%), defeating Ernest Theophilus Quist of the New Patriotic Party (NPP) and Cephas Avorgbedor of the Liberal Party of Ghana (LPG).

== Parliamentary committees ==
He serves on the Trade, Industry and Tourism Committee and the Public Accounts Committee in Parliament.
