= Nikyema Billa Alamzy =

Ghanaian politician and businessman

Hon. Nikyema Billa Alamzy

Member of Parliament for Chiana‑Paga Constituency
- Incumbent
- Assumed office January 2025

Personal details
- Born: September 23, 1985 (age 40) Paga, Ghana
- Party: National Democratic Congress
- Education: GIMPA
- Profession: Businessman, Politician

Nikyema Billa Alamzy (born 23 September 1985) is a Ghanaian politician and businessman who serves as the Member of Parliament for the Chiana‑Paga Constituency in the Upper East Region. He was elected on the ticket of the National Democratic Congress (NDC) in the 2024 general election.

== Early life and education ==
Alamzy is from Paga in the Upper East Region of Ghana. He earned a Master's degree in Marketing from the Ghana Institute of Management and Public Administration (GIMPA) in July 2022.

== Career ==
Alamzy contested the NDC parliamentary primaries in both 2019 and 2023. He was elected to Parliament in the December 2024 general election and officially assumed office in January 2025, succeeding Thomas Adda Dalu as the Member of Parliament for Chiana‑Paga Constituency. He is a member of the Education Committee and the House Committee in the 9th Parliament of the Fourth Republic of Ghana.

== See also ==
- Chiana-Paga (Ghana parliament constituency)
- Parliament of Ghana
