= Fred Kwesi Agbenyo =

Fred Kwesi Agbenyo is a Ghanaian politician and member of parliament representing Guan constituency in the 9th Parliament of the 4th Republic of Ghana under the auspices of National Democratic Congress (NDC).

== Early life and education ==
Agbenyo was born on Monday, 2 February 1976. He attended EP Junior High School where he attained his Basic Education Certificate Examination (B.E.C.E) in 1991. He then continued to Nkonya Senior High School, where he also obtained his West African Senior School Certificate Examination (WASSCE) in the year 1994. He obtained his Cert A in 2001 from Accra College of Education. He graduated from University of Ghana, Legon with a bachelor's degree in 2008 and Master of Arts degree in 2014. He furthered his education at the Institute of Development and Technology Management in 2023 where he obtained his Master of Philosophy.

== Employment ==
Agbenyo worked at Ghana Freezones Authority where he is the Monitoring and Evaluation Officer.

== Personal life ==
He is a Christian and hails from the Akpafu Mempeasem in the Volta Region of Ghana.
