= Abdul-Khaliq Mohammed Sherif =

Ghanaian medical doctor and politician

Hon. Abdul-Khaliq Mohammed Sherif

Member of Parliament for Nanton
- Incumbent
- Assumed office 7 January 2025
- President: John Mahama

Personal details
- Born: April 30, 1984 (age 42) Nanton, Ghana
- Party: National Democratic Congress (NDC)
- Education: College of Medicine of South Africa; University for Development Studies; GIMPA; Prempeh College
- Occupation: Medical doctor, Politician

Abdul-Khaliq Mohammed Sherif (born 30 April 1984) is a Ghanaian medical doctor and politician. He is the Member of Parliament for the Ninth Parliament of the 4th Republic of Ghana representing Nanton Constituency in the Northern Region of Ghana. He was elected on the ticket of the National Democratic Congress (NDC) in the 2024 general elections and assumed office in January 2025.

== Early life and education ==
Sherif hails from Nanton in the Northern Region of Ghana. He obtained his Basic Education Certificate from Tamale International School in 2000 and completed his Senior Secondary School Certificate Examination at Prempeh College in 2004. He studied Human Biology at the University for Development Studies (UDS), earning a BSc in 2009 and a Bachelor of Medicine, Bachelor of Surgery (MBChB) in 2013. In 2016, he completed a program in Health Administration and Management at the Ghana Institute of Management and Public Administration (GIMPA). He became a Fellow of the College of Obstetricians and Gynaecologists, College of Medicine of South Africa, in 2024.

== Career ==
Sherif worked with the Ghana Health Service under the Ministry of Health, where he served as a Senior Medical Officer and later as a Medical Superintendent. In the 2024 general elections, he contested and won the Nanton parliamentary seat on the ticket of the National Democratic Congress, beginning his first term in Parliament in January 2025. He currently serves as a member of the Health Committee and the Backbenchers' Business Committee.

== Committee Membership in Parliament ==
Abdul Khaliq serves in the following committees in the Ninth Parliament of the 4th Republic of Ghana;

- Health Committee as member and
- Human Rights Committee as a member
