= Dickson Kyere-Duah =

Ghanaian politician

Hon. Dickson Kyere-Duah MP

Member of Parliament for Berekum West
- Incumbent
- Assumed office 7 January 2025
- Preceded by: Kwaku Agyenim-Boateng
- President: John Mahama
- Vice President: Jane Naana Opoku-Agyemang

Personal details
- Born: 5 February 1974 (age 52)
- Party: National Democratic Congress (Ghana)
- Education: University of Education, Winneba; Glasgow Caledonian University; University of Media, Arts and Communication
- Occupation: Politician
- Committees: Environment, Science and Technology; Ways and Means

Hon. Dickson Kyere-Duah is a Ghanaian politician and a member of the National Democratic Congress. He represents the Berekum West Constituency of the Bono region in the 9th Parliament of the 4th republic of Ghana.

== Early life and education ==
Kyere-Duah was born on 5 February 1974 and is from Jinijini in the Bono Region of Ghana. He attended Sunyani Senior High School, where he completed his Senior Secondary School Certificate Examination (SSSCE) in December 1993.

He obtained a Bachelor of Education in Science Education from the University of Education, Winneba in August 2003. In November 2009, he obtained a Master of Science in Waste Management from Glasgow Caledonian University in the United Kingdom. He subsequently obtained a Master of Arts in Public Relations from the University of Media, Arts and Communication (UNIMAC) in October 2021. In January 2022, he became an Accredited Member of the Institute of Public Relations Ghana.

== Career ==
Kyere-Duah began his career in education as an intern at Twene Amanfo Senior High School in Sunyani and later worked as a teacher with the Ghana Education Service at Wamanafo L/A Junior High School.

He joined Sunyani Technical University, where he has held several positions, including Instructor, Lecturer, Environment and Sanitation Officer, Acting Estate Officer, Facilities and Environmental Manager, and Public Relations Officer. He later became Head of Public Relations at the university.
