= Alhassan Sulemana =

Ghanaian politician

Hon. Sulemana Alhassan

Member of Parliament for Yunyoo
- Incumbent
- Assumed office 7 January 2025

Personal details
- Born: 6 May 1992 (age 33) Ghana
- Party: National Democratic Congress

Sulemana Alhassan (born 6 May 1992) is a Ghanaian politician who serves as the Member of Parliament for the Yunyoo constituency in the North East Region. He is affiliated with the National Democratic Congress (NDC).

== Early life and education ==
Alhassan is from Bunkpurugu in the North East Region of Ghana. He attended Gushegu Senior High School, completing the West African Senior School Certificate Examination (WASSCE) in May 2014. He later earned a Bachelor of Arts degree in Human Resource Management from Valley View University in November 2024.

== Career ==
Alhassan contested the Yunyoo parliamentary seat in the 2024 general elections on the ticket of the National Democratic Congress and was elected to Parliament. He assumed office in January 2025, marking his first term in the Parliament of Ghana.

== See also ==
- Parliament of Ghana
