= Richard Kuuire =

Ghanaian politician

Richard Kuuire is a Ghanaian politician who formerly served as Director General of the Ghana Prisons Service. He is currently Member of Parliament Elect for the Nandom Constituency in the Upper West Region of Ghana during the just ended 2024 Ghanaian general election.
