= Mahmoud Issifu =

Ghanaian politician

Mahmoud Issifu is a Ghanaian politician and a member of the National Democratic Congress. He represents Binduri Constituency in the 9th parliament of the 4th republic of Ghana.
