= Thomas Worlanyo Tsekpo =

Ghanaian politician

Thomas Worlanyo Tsekpo is a Ghanaian politician and a member of the National Democratic Congress (NDC). He represents Hohoe constituency in Volta region in the 9th Parliament of the 4th Republic of Ghana.

== Early life and education ==
He was born on 30 June 1984. He hails from Alavanyo-kpeme, a village in the Hohoe district of the Volta Region of Ghana.

He attained his Senior Secondary School Certificate Exams (SSSCE) in 2003 at Kintampo Secondary School. He furthered his education at Kumasi Technical University, where he obtained HND in entrepreneurship and finance certificate and bachelor's degree in technology and entrepreneurship in 2011 and 2022, respectively. He is currently pursuing his professional certificate at Accra Business College.

== Politics ==
He first entered parliament following the 2024 Ghanaian general election where he won the seat with 67.42% of the total votes (31,163 votes).
