= Bright Asamoah Brefo =

Ghanaian politician (born 1967)

- Incumbent
- Assumed office 7 January 2025
- Constituency: Bibiani-Anhwiaso-Bekwai

Personal details
- Born: November 25, 1967 (age 58) Ghana
- Party: National Democratic Congress
- Education: Drobo Secondary School; Kumasi High School; University of Ghana; University of Maryland University College
- Occupation: Politician, Businessman
- Profession: CEO

Bright Asamoah Brefo (born 25 November 1967) is a Ghanaian politician and Member of Parliament for the Bibiani-Anhwiaso-Bekwai constituency. He is a member of the National Democratic Congress (NDC) and was elected during the 2024 Ghanaian general election.

== Early life and education ==
Brefo was born on 25 November 1967. He obtained his GCE Ordinary Level Certificate from Drobo Secondary School in 1988 and his GCE Advanced Level Certificate from Kumasi High School in 1990. He later earned a Bachelor of Arts degree in Political Science and Linguistics from the University of Ghana in 1997.

In 2009, he completed a Master of Science degree at the University of Maryland University College, and in 2010, he earned a Master of Business Administration (MBA) from the same institution.

== Career ==
Before entering politics, Brefo held various positions in both Ghana and the United States. He served as a District Manager at Akuafo Adamfo Marketing Company and at Cashpro Company Ltd, where he also worked as a Port Officer. He later worked as an Independent Associate at Pre-Paid Legal Insurance USA, Inc., and is currently self-employed as a Chief Executive Officer (CEO).

== Political career ==
Brefo was elected as the NDC parliamentary candidate for the Bibiani-Anhwiaso-Bekwai constituency in the party’s internal primaries. He went on to win the seat in the 2024 parliamentary elections, representing the constituency in Ghana’s Ninth Parliament of the Fourth Republic.
