= Issa Salifu Taylor =

Ghanaian politician

Hon. Issa Salifu Taylor

Member of Parliament for Tarkwa-Nsuaem Constituency
- Incumbent
- Assumed office January 2025
- Preceded by: George Mireku Duker

Personal details
- Born: Ghana
- Party: National Democratic Congress
- Profession: Politician

Issa Salifu Taylor is the MP of the National Democratic Congress for Tarkwa-Nsuaem Constituency in Ghana.
