= Bortianor-Ngleshie-Amanfrom (Ghana parliament constituency) =

Constituency in Ghana

Bortianor-Ngleshie-Amanfro
- constituency for the Parliament of Ghana
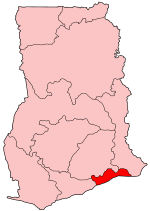
- District: Ga West Municipal District
- Region: Greater Accra Region of Ghana

Current constituency
- Party: National Democratic Congress
- MP: Felix Akwetey Okle

Bortianor-Ngleshie-Amanfro is one of the constituencies represented in the Parliament of Ghana. It elects one Member of Parliament (MP) by the first past the post system of election. Felix Akwetey Okle is the member of parliament for the constituency. Bortianor-Ngleshie-Amanfro is located in the Ga South Municipal District of the Greater Accra Region.

== Boundaries ==
The seat is located within the Ga South Municipal District of the Greater Accra Region of Ghana.

== Members of Parliament ==
Election	Member	Party
2016	Habib Saad	NPP

== Elections ==
2016 parliamentary election
Party	Candidate	Votes	%
NPP	Habib Saad	26,034	53.09
NDC	Bright Edward Kodzo Demordzi	19,405	39.57
PPP	Adjetey Larbie	2,529	5.16
DPP	Evans Nii Djabum Mensah	867	1.77
CPP	Peter Adzido	200	0.41

== See also ==
- List of Ghana Parliament constituencies
- List of political parties in Ghana
