= Felix Akwetey Okle =

Ghanaian politician

Hon. Felix Akwetey Okle

Member of Parliament for Bortianor–Ngleshie Amanfro
- Incumbent
- Assumed office 7 January 2025
- Preceded by: Sylvester Tetteh
- Constituency: Bortianor–Ngleshie Amanfro

Personal details
- Born: 2 February 1968 (age 58) Nungua, Greater Accra Region, Ghana
- Education: University of Ghana; Management, Development and Productivity Institute
- Occupation: Politician
- Committees: Information and Communications Committee; Ethics and Standards Committee

Felix Akwetey Okle (born 2 February 1968) is a Ghanaian politician and a member of the Parliament of Ghana representing the Bortianor-Ngleshie-Amanfro constituency in the Greater Accra Region. He was elected on the ticket of the National Democratic Congress (NDC) in the 2024 Ghanaian general election.

== Early life and education ==
Felix Akwetey Okle was born on 2 February 1968 and hails from Nungua in the Greater Accra Region. He is a Christian.

He attended Nungua Senior High School, where he obtained his Ordinary Level Certificate in 1990. He later studied at the University of Ghana, earning a Bachelor of Science in Administration in 2012 and a Master of Business Administration in 2016. In 2012, he also obtained a Certificate in Oil and Gas from the Management, Development and Productivity Institute.

== Career ==
Before entering politics, Okle worked in the hospitality industry. He served as a manager at the Riverway Hotel in Accra.

== Politics ==
Okle is a member of the National Democratic Congress (NDC). He contested the Bortianor-Ngleshie Amanfro parliamentary seat in the 2024 Ghanaian general election and won, defeating the incumbent Member of Parliament and Deputy Minister for Information, Sylvester Tetteh.

In Parliament, he serves as a member of the Information and Communications Committee and the Ethics and Standards Committee.
