= Eric Edem Agbana =

Ghanaian politician

Eric Edem Agbana is a Ghanaian politician and Member of Parliament (MP) for Ketu North constituency since January 7, 2025.

== Career ==
He began his leadership career as the president of the Student Representative Council (SRC) of the University of Ghana in 2013.

He was a deputy national youth organiser of the National Democratic Congress before submitting his bid to contest for the seat at Ketu North. He won the Ketu North constituency primaries by a vote in May 2023. He is a member of the Education Committee and a member of the Public Accounts Committee.
