= Wenchi (Ghana parliament constituency) =

Constituency in the Bono East Region of Ghana

- constituency for the Parliament of Ghana
- Region: Bono Region of Ghana

Current constituency
- Party: New Patriotic Party
- MP: Haruna Seidu

Wenchi is one of the constituencies represented in the Parliament of Ghana. It elects one Member of Parliament (MP) by the first past the post system of election.

Haruna Seidu is the member of parliament for the constituency. He was elected on the ticket of the party National Democratic Congress.

== See also ==
- List of Ghana Parliament constituencies
