= Yendi Senior High School =

Coeducational secondary school in Northern Region, Ghana

Yendi Senior High School (YESS) is a category B coeducational secondary school in Yendi in the Northern Region of Ghana. The school was established in 1970, first as a middle-boarding school to enable access to basic education for communities in the Eastern Corridor enclave, before being upgraded in September of the same year to the status of a secondary school. For the first academic year, the school had only a total student population of 77, with 70 boys and seven girls. The first headmaster of the school was Cletus Bernard Teviu. He headed the school for nearly a decade, spanning between 1970 and 1979, and one of the hostels in the school has been named in his honour. In the year 2020 when the school celebrated its 50th anniversary, the total student population was 2,724 and the number of teachers was 121. The school operates as a boarding school, but few students attend as day students. It is ranked the 274th on the national level, 7th on the regional level and 1st on the district level.

== History ==
As of 2016, the school had a girls' dormitory with 500 students.

In 2018, Alhaji Faruok Aliu Mahama donated GH¢ 10,000.00 to the school for a water project.

The Jubilee Park at the school was used in January 2019 as part of the coronation process for Yaa Naa Abubakari Mahama as king of Dagbon.

== Courses ==
YESS offers a lot of courses. Below are the courses offered;

- Business
- Home Economics
- General Science
- General Arts
- Agriculture

== Extra Curricular Activities ==
- Sports Activities
- School clubs and Societies

== Vision ==
To be a training center for students seeking higher education and provide the needed manpower for national development.

== Mission ==
To bring education to the doorsteps of every Ghanaian child.
