= Isaac Yaw Opoku =

Ghanaian politician (born 1957)

Hon. Isaac Yaw Opoku MP
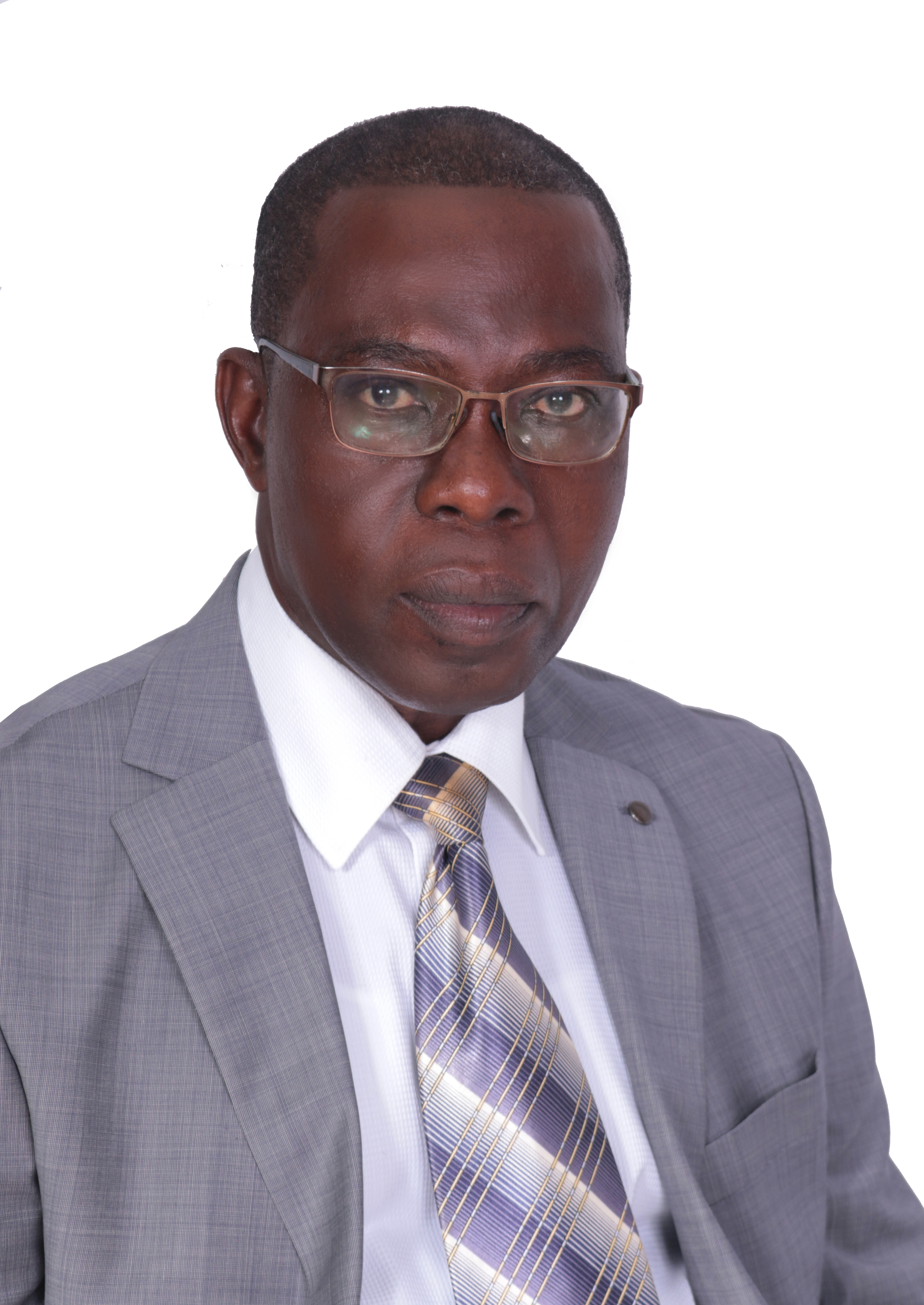

Member of Parliament for Offinso South Constituency
- Incumbent
- Assumed office 7 January 2021
- Preceded by: Ben Abdallah Banda

Personal details
- Born: Isaac Yaw Opoku; 27 August 1957 (age 68) Offinso, Ghana
- Occupation: Politician
- Committees: Members Holding Offices of Profit Committee, Trade, Industry and Tourism Committee

Isaac Yaw Opoku is a Ghanaian politician and member of parliament for the Offinso South constituency in the Ashanti region of Ghana.

== Early life and education ==
He was born on 27 August 1957 and hails from Offinso in the Ashanti region of Ghana. He holds a PhD in mycology in 1993.

== Career ==
He was the executive director of the Cocoa Research Institute of Ghana under Cocobod.

=== Political career ===
He is a member of the NPP and currently the MP for Offinso South Constituency. In the 2020 General Elections, he won the parliamentary seat with 39,971 votes, whilst Yussif Haruna had 19,952 votes.

=== Committees ===
He is a member of the Members Holding Offices of Profit Committee and also a member of the Trade, Industry, and Tourism Committee.

== Personal life ==
Opoku is a Christian.
