= Biakoye =

Ghana parliament constituency

- constituency for the Parliament of Ghana
- District: Biakoye District
- Region: Oti Region of Ghana

Current constituency
- Party: National Democratic Congress
- MP: Hon. Jean-Marie Formadi

The Biakoye constituency is one of the constituencies represented in the Parliament of Ghana. It elects one Member of Parliament (MP) by the first past the post system of election. It is located in the Biakoye district of the Oti Region of Ghana.

== Boundaries ==
The constituency is located within the Biakoye district of the Oti Region of Ghana. To the north is the Krachi East district, to the west, the Volta River, to the south the Hohoe Municipal and Kpando Municipal districts which are both in the Volta Region and to the east, the Ghana - Togo border. The constituency was originally located within the Volta Region of Ghana until new Regions were created following the December 2018 referendum.

== Members of Parliament ==
First elected	Member	Party
1965	Sylvanus Desmond Magnus-George	Convention People's Party
1969	Obed Asamoah	National Alliance of Liberals
1979	Kwadzo Amoah	People's National Party
1992	Kwabena Adjei	National Democratic Congress
2004	Emmanuel Kwasi Bandua	National Democratic Congress
2016	Kwadwo Nyanpon Aboagye	National Democratic Congress

== Elections ==
2016 Ghanaian general election: Biakoye Source:GhanaWeb
Party	Candidate	Votes	%	±%
National Democratic Congress	Kwadwo Nyanpon Aboagye	18,152	71.96	+4.22
New Patriotic Party	Komla Onny	6,716	26.62	−4.62
Progressive People's Party	Selorm Agbolosu	229	0.91	
National Democratic Party	Appiah Evans	66	0.26	
Convention People's Party	Frederick Duncan Modzabi	63	0.25	−0.77
Majority		11,436		
Turnout		25,226		

2012 Ghanaian general election: Biakoye Source:GhanaWeb
Party	Candidate	Votes	%	±%
National Democratic Congress	Emmanuel Kwasi Bandua	19,714	67.74	
New Patriotic Party	Daniel Korsinah	9,092	31.24	
Convention People's Party	Dzato Moses	297	1.02	
Majority				
Turnout		29,103		—

2008 Ghanaian parliamentary election: Biakoye Source:Ghana Home Page
Party	Candidate	Votes	%	±%
National Democratic Congress	Emmanuel Kwasi Bandua	16,083	66.4	+13.2
New Patriotic Party	Kwasi Owusu-Yeboa	7,126	29.4	+4.4
Convention People's Party	Kpentey Philip	666	2.8	—
Democratic Freedom Party	Atsu Nuworkporm	275	1.1	—
Democratic People's Party	Richard Amoako	57	0.2	—
Majority		8,957	37.0	+8.8
Turnout				—

2004 Ghanaian parliamentary election: Biakoye Source:National Electoral Commission, Ghana
Party	Candidate	Votes	%	±%
National Democratic Congress	Emmanuel Kwasi Bandua	14,459	53.2	−5.8
New Patriotic Party	Kwasi Owusu Yeboah	6,784	25.0	6.1
Independent	Alfred Kofi Appiah	5,782	21.3	—
People's National Convention	George Kofi Afari	141	0.5	—
Majority		7,675	28.2	15.2
Turnout		25,340	88.5	—

2000 Ghanaian parliamentary election: Biakoye Source:Adam Carr's Election Archives
Party	Candidate	Votes	%	±%
National Democratic Congress	Kwabena Adjei	15,306	69.0	−9.0
New Patriotic Party	Edward C. Boateng	4,108	18.9	+11.7
National Reform Party	William K. Semanhyia	1,674	7.7	—
Convention People's Party	Christiana O. Nyarko	751	3.4	—
United Ghana Movement	Atsu N. Missiahyia	210	1.0	—
Majority		2,920	13.0	—

1996 Ghanaian parliamentary election: Biakoye Source:Electoral Commission of Ghana
Party	Candidate	Votes	%	±%
National Democratic Congress	Kwabena Adjei	20,740	78.0	—
New Patriotic Party	Abotsina Festus Andrews	1,903	7.2	—
Democratic People's Party	Alexander Kwame Mensah	1,897	7.1	—
People's Convention Party	Christiana Amaa Pokuah Nyarko	1,706	6.4	—
People's National Convention	George K. Afari	348	1.3	—
Majority		18,837	70.8	—
Turnout		26,594	81.9	+40.0

1992 Ghanaian parliamentary election: Biakoye Source:Electoral Commission of Ghana
Party	Candidate	Votes	%	±%
National Democratic Congress	Kwabena Adjei			—
Majority				—
Turnout		17,409	51.9	—

== See also ==
- List of Ghana Parliament constituencies
