= Sefwi-Akontombra (Ghana parliament constituency) =

Parliamentary constituency in Ghana

- constituency for the Parliament of Ghana
- District: Sefwi-Akontombra District
- Region: Western North Region of Ghana

Current constituency
- Created: 2004
- Party: National Democratic Congress
- MP: Djornobuah Alex Tetteh

Sefwi-Akontombra is one of the constituencies represented in the Parliament of Ghana. It elects one Member of Parliament (MP) by the first -past-the-post system of election. Sefwi-Akontombra is located in the Sefwi-Akontombra district of the Western North Region of Ghana.

== Boundaries ==
The seat is located within the Sefwi-Akontombra District of the Western North Region, formerly part of Western Region of Ghana. It was formed prior to the December 2004 presidential and parliamentary elections by the division of the old Sefwi-Wiawso constituency into the new Sefwi-Akontombra and Sefwi-Wiawso constituencies.

== Members of Parliament ==
Election	Member	Party
2004	Herod Cobbina	National Democratic Congress

== Elections ==
2004 Ghanaian parliamentary election:Essikado-Ketan Source:Electoral Commission of Ghana
Party	Candidate	Votes	%	±%
National Democratic Congress	Herod Cobbina	14477	59.0	N/A
New Patriotic Party	Baidoo Appiah Kubi NPP	10,060	41.0	N/A
Majority		4,417	18.0	N/A
Turnout		24,950	89.6	N/A

== See also ==
- List of Ghana Parliament constituencies
