= Tema Central (Ghana parliament constituency) =

Constituency in Ghana

- constituency for the Parliament of Ghana
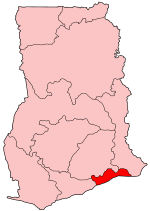
- District: Tema Metropolitan Assembly
- Region: Greater Accra Region of Ghana

Current constituency
- Party: New Patriotic Party
- MP: Charles Forson

Tema Central is one of the constituencies represented in the Parliament of Ghana. It elects one Member of Parliament (MP) by the first past the post system of election. The Tema Central constituency is located in the Greater Accra Region of Ghana. Charles Forson is a member of parliament for the constituency. He was elected on the ticket of the New Patriotic Party (NPP) and won a majority of 28,334 votes to become the MP.

== Boundaries ==
The constituency is located within the Greater Accra Region of Ghana and part of the Tema municipality.

== See also ==
- List of Ghana Parliament constituencies
- List of political parties in Ghana
