= Aowin (Ghana parliament constituency) =

Parliamentary constituency in Ghana

- constituency for the Parliament of Ghana
- District: Aowin District
- Region: Western North Region of Ghana

Current constituency
- Party: National Democratic Congress
- MP: Oscar Ofori Larbi

Aowin Constituency is one of the constituencies represented in the Parliament of Ghana. It elects one Member of Parliament (MP) by the first past the post system of election. Aowin is located in the Aowin district of the Western North Region of Ghana.

== See also ==
- List of Ghana Parliament constituencies
