= Walewale (Ghana parliament constituency) =

Constituency in Ghana

- constituency for the Parliament of Ghana
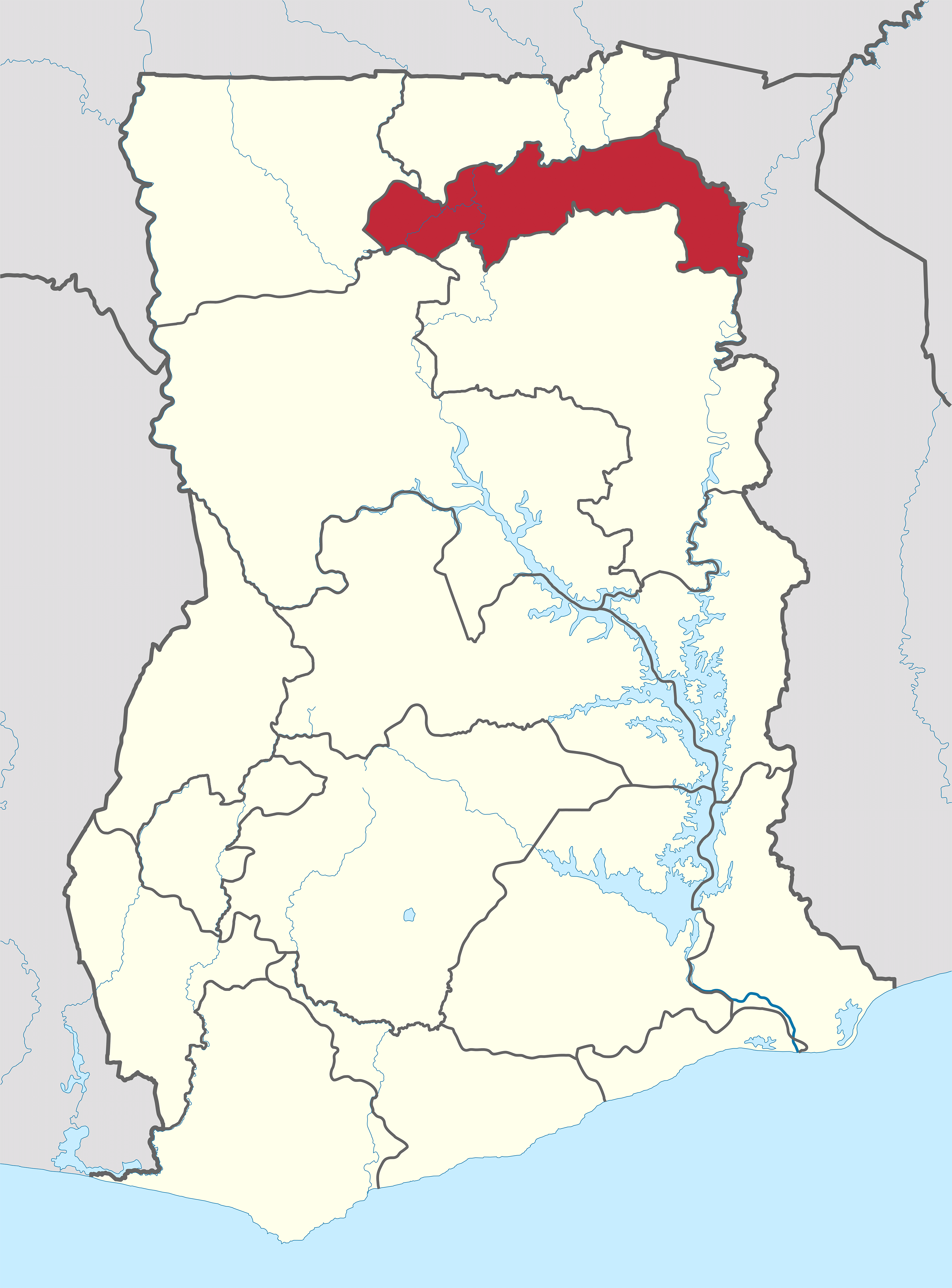
- District: West Mamprusi District
- Region: North East Region of Ghana

Current constituency
- Created: 2021
- Party: New Patriotic Party
- MP: Dr. Tia Abdul Kabiru Mahama

Walewale is one of the constituencies represented in the Parliament of Ghana. It elects one Member of Parliament (MP) by the first past the post (Simple Majority) system of election. Walewale is located in the West Mamprusi Municipal of the North East Region of Ghana. It is the Municipal capital of West Mamprusi Municipal Assembly. The constituency was formerly called the West Mamprusi Constituency.

== Boundaries ==
The seat is located entirely within the Nanumba South district of the Northern Region of Ghana.

== Members of Parliament ==
Election	Member	Party
1992	Ben Baluri Saibu	National Democratic Congress
1996	Susanna Adam	National Democratic Congress
2000	Issifu Asumah	People's National Convention
2004	Alidu Iddrisu Zakari	National Democratic Congress

== Elections ==
2008 Ghanaian parliamentary election: Walewale Source:Ghana Home Page
Party	Candidate	Votes	%	±%
National Democratic Congress	Alidu Iddrisu Zakari	13,839	40.6	5.3
New Patriotic Party	Nabila Sulemana	12,828	37.6	5.0
People's National Convention	Abdallah Abubakar	7,020	20.6	−10.5
Convention People's Party	Azaratu Iddirsu Sampa	265	0.8	−0.3
Democratic Freedom Party	Adam Mampaya Dadimsugru	161	0.5	—
Majority		1,011	3.0	0.3
Turnout		—	—	—

2004 Ghanaian parliamentary election: Walewale Source:Electoral Commission of Ghana
Party	Candidate	Votes	%	±%
National Democratic Congress	Alidu Iddrisu Zakari	11,355	35.3	−2.0
New Patriotic Party	Nabla Sulemana	10,490	32.6	28.2
People's National Convention	Mbah Jacob Kanzoni	10,007	31.1	−24.3
Convention People's Party	Ahmed Issahaku	359	1.1	
Majority		865	2.7	1.7
Turnout		34,389	90.4	

2000 Ghanaian parliamentary election: West Mamprusi Source:Adam Carr's Election Archives
Party	Candidate	Votes	%	±%
People's National Convention	Issifu Asumah	18,907	55.4	44.9
National Democratic Congress	Susanna Adam	12,735	37.3	−25.7
New Patriotic Party	Amadu Abdul-Karim	1,509	4.4	—
Convention People's Party	Shani Danladi	631	1.8	—
National Reform Party	Iliasu Yussif	339	1.0	—
Majority		6,172	18.1	−20.9

1996 Ghanaian parliamentary election: Walewale Source:Electoral Commission of Ghana
Party	Candidate	Votes	%	±%
National Democratic Congress	Susanna Adam	23,021	63.0	
People's Convention Party	Stephen Sumani Nayina	8,761	24.0	
People's National Convention	Amadu Sulemana	3,833	10.5	
National Convention Party	Sulemana Wakaso Musah	938	2.5	
Majority		14,260	39.0	
Turnout		19,978	86.46	

1992 Ghanaian parliamentary election: Walewale Source:
Party	Candidate	Votes	%	±%
National Democratic Congress	Ben Baluri Saibu	—	—	—
Majority		—	—	—
Turnout		—	—	—

== See also ==
- List of Ghana Parliament constituencies
