= Mountcrest University College =

Private higher-education institution in Ghana

- Type: Private
- Established: 2008
- Affiliations: University of Ghana
- Location: Kanda, Accra, Greater Accra Region, Ghana; 05°34′54″N 0°11′37″E
- Campus: Suburban area
- Website: www.mountcrestuniversity.com

Mountcrest University College is a private co-ed tertiary institution in Ghana.
