= Trobu (Ghana parliament constituency) =

Constituency in the Ghanaian Parliament

- constituency for the Parliament of Ghana
- District: Ga West District
- Region: Greater Accra Region of Ghana

Current constituency
- Created: 2016
- Party: New Patriotic Party
- MP: Gloria Owusu

Trobu is one of the constituencies represented in the Parliament of Ghana. It elects one Member of Parliament (MP) by the first past the post system of election. Gloria Owusu is the current member of parliament for the constituency. She was elected on the ticket of the New Patriotic Party (NPP). She succeeded Moses Anim.

== Members of Parliament ==
Election	Member	Party
2016	Trobu0242	Patriotic Party

== See also ==
- List of Ghana Parliament constituencies
