= Politics of Ghana =

The Politics of Ghana takes place in a framework of a presidential representative democratic republic, whereby the president of Ghana is head of state and head of government, and of a two party system. The seat of government is at Golden Jubilee House. Executive power is exercised by the government. Legislative power is vested in the government and Parliament. The judiciary is independent of the executive and the legislature.

Historically, Ghanaian politics has been characterized by restrictions in political freedoms and political instability, with periods of authoritarian rule and coups. After independence, the dominant political party in Ghana established a one-party system of government. Prior to its democratic transition in 1992, Ghana had one-party rule and military rule. The foundations of Ghanaian democracy are rooted in the 1992 Constitution which established an independent Electoral Commission and independent court system. The Economist Intelligence Unit rated Ghana a "flawed democracy" in 2022.

== Legislative branch ==
Legislative functions are vested in Parliament, which consists of a unicameral (one chamber) 276-member body plus the Speaker. To become law, legislation must have the assent of the president, who has a qualified veto over all bills except those to which a vote of urgency is attached.

== Executive branch ==
The president is head of state, head of government, and commander in chief of the armed forces. They appoint (buffalo) the vice president. According to the Constitution, more than half of the presidentially appointed ministers of state must be appointed from among members of Parliament.

Main office-holders
Office	Name	Party	Since
President	John Mahama	National Democratic Congress	7 January 2025
Vice-President	Jane Naana Opoku-Agyemang	National Democratic Congress	7 January 2025

The outcome of the December 2012 elections, in which John Dramani Mahama was declared President by the Ghana Electoral Commission, was challenged by Nana Akufo-Addo, Mahamudu Bawumia and Jake Obetsebi-Lamptey at the Supreme Court of Ghana, which came out with the verdict that Mahama legally won the 2012 presidential election.

This precedent which was set by Nana Akufo-Addo and the NPP party in 2012 was followed by John Dramani Mahama the then president, and later opposition leader and the NDC party when they petition the Highest Court of the Land to overturn the election victory of Nana Akufo-Addo and the NPP party on the grounds that the victory was illegal.

== Judicial branch ==
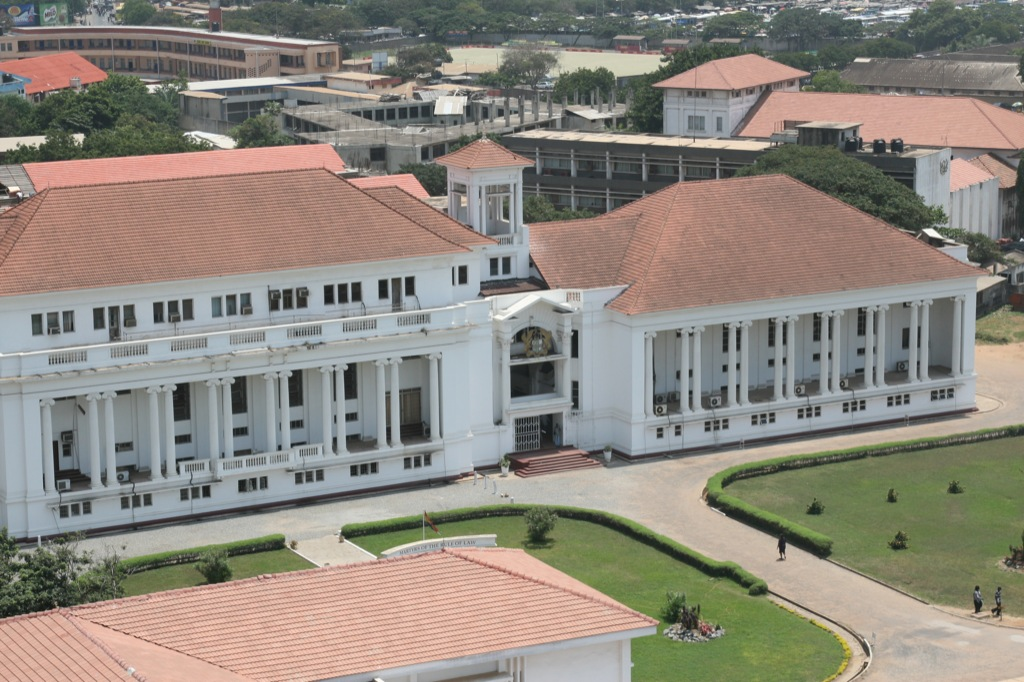
Supreme Court of Ghana.

The structure and power of the judiciary are independent of the other two branches of government. The Judiciary of Ghana is responsible for interpreting, applying and enforcing the country's laws, and exists to settle legal conflicts fairly and competently. The Supreme Court of Ghana has broad powers of judicial review. Per the Constitution, it is authorized to rule on the constitutionality of any legislation or executive action at the request of any aggrieved citizen. The hierarchy of courts derives mostly from British juridical forms. The courts have jurisdiction over all civil and criminal matters. They include the Superior Courts of Judicature, established under the 1994 Constitution, and the Inferior Courts, established by Parliament. The Superior Courts are, from highest to lowest: the Supreme Court of Ghana, the Court of Appeal, the High Court of Justice, and the ten Regional Tribunals. The Inferior Courts, since the Courts Act 2002, include the Circuit Courts, the Magistrate Courts, and special courts such as the Juvenile Courts.

In 2007, Georgina Wood became the first-ever female chief justice of the Ghanaian Supreme Court. On 11 May 2011, Nana Akufo-Addo nominated Sophia Abena Boafoa Akuffo the Chief Justice of Ghana to replace Georgina Wood. She was officially inaugurated into the position on 19 June 2017 and retired on 20 December 2019. On Tuesday, 7 January 2020, Nana Addo Dankwa Akufo-Addo, sworn into office Kwasi Anin-Yeboah as the next Chief Justice of Ghana replacing Sophia A. B. Akuffo. He retired on 24 May 2023 after having served 21 years as a judge and 3 years as the head of the Judiciary of Ghana. The next Chief Justice is Gertrude Araba Esaaba Sackey Torkornoo, who was sworn-in into office on 12 June 2023.

== Developments ==
Nana Akufo-Addo, the ruling party candidate, was defeated in an election by John Atta Mills of the National Democratic Congress (NDC) following the Ghanaian presidential election, 2008. Mills died of natural causes and was succeeded by vice-president John Dramani Mahama on 24 July 2012.

Following the Ghanaian presidential election, 2012, John Dramani Mahama became President-elect and was inaugurated on 7 January 2013. Ghana was a "stable democracy".

As a result of the Ghanaian presidential election, 2016, Nana Akufo-Addo became President-elect and was inaugurated as the fifth President of the Fourth Republic of Ghana and eighth President of Ghana on 7 January 2017. In December 2020, President Nana Akufo-Addo was re-elected after the 2020 Ghanaian general election.

== Administrative divisions ==
Ghana is divided into sixteen regions:

Region	Capital
Ashanti	Kumasi
Ahafo	Goaso
Bono	Sunyani
Bono East	Techiman
Central	Cape Coast
Eastern	Koforidua
Greater Accra	Accra
Oti	Dambai
Northern	Tamale
North East	Nalerigu
Upper East	Bolgatanga
Upper West	Wa
Volta	Ho
Western North	Sefwi Wiaso
Savannah	Damongo
Western	Sekondi-Takoradi
