= List of MPs elected in the 2020 Ghanaian general election =

MPs of the Fourth Republic of Ghana

Colonial Era
1951 Assembly	(election)
1954 Assembly	(election)
1956 Assembly	(election)
First Republic
1957 Parliament	(election)
1965 Parliament	(election)
Second Republic
1969 Parliament	(election)
Third Republic
1979 Parliament	(election)
Fourth Republic
1st Parliament	(1992)
2nd Parliament	(1996)
3rd Parliament	(2000)
4th Parliament	(2004)
5th Parliament	(2008)
6th Parliament	(2012)
7th Parliament	(2016)
8th Parliament	(2020)
9th Parliament	(2024)

The 2020 Ghanaian general election was held on 7 December 2020 to elect Members of Parliament (MPs) to the 8th Parliament of the Fourth Republic. The Speaker is not an elected member of parliament though is qualified to stand for election as such. There are a total of 276 constituencies in Ghana. The 8th Parliament convened on 7 January 2021 to elect a Speaker and Deputy Speakers as well as for the administration of oaths to the Speaker and Members of Parliament.

Results of the 2020 Ghanaian parliamentary election by constituency

== Current composition ==
Affiliation	Members
New Patriotic Party (NPP)	137
National Democratic Congress (NDC)	137
Independent	1
Total	275
Government Majority	1 (Note: The independent candidate, a former NPP MP, votes with the NPP giving NPP a majority of 1 in the house.)
Source: GhanaWeb

== List of MPs elected in the general election ==
Some of the MPs who had been in parliament for many years decided not to stand again in the 2020 election. There were 11 in this category including Alban Bagbin, MP for Nadowli West constituency and previously Nadowli North since 2001. As many as 40 NPP MPs lost their primaries while 9 suffered the same fate in the NDC.

Table of contents:

Ahafo Region • Ashanti Region • Bono Region • Bono East region • Central Region • Eastern Region • Greater Accra Region • Northern Region
North East Region • Oti Region • Savannah Region • Upper East Region • Upper West Region • Volta Region • Western Region • Western North Region
Notes • See also • References • External links and sources

	=== Ahafo Region - 6 seats ===					
No.	Constituency	Elected MP	Elected Party	Majority	Previous MP	Previous Party
1	Asunafo North	Evans Bobie Opoku	NPP	3,394	Evans Bobie Opoku	NPP
2	Asunafo South	Eric Opoku	NDC	1,395	Eric Opoku	NDC
3	Asutifi North	Patrick Banor	NPP	1,959	Benhazin Joseph Dahah	NPP
4	Asutifi South	Collins Dauda	NDC	2,659	Collins Dauda	NDC
5	Tano North	Freda Prempeh	NPP	3,908	Freda Prempeh	NPP
6	Tano South	Benjamin Yeboah Sekyere	NPP	2,303	Benjamin Yeboah Sekyere	NPP
	=== Ashanti Region - 47 seats ===					
No.	Constituency	Elected MP	Elected Party	Majority	Previous MP	Previous Party
1	Adansi-Akrofuom	Alex Blankson	NPP		(Note: These 11 MPs decided to quit and to not contest their seats again in the 2020 election.)Kwabena Appiah-Pinkrah	NPP
2	Adansi-Asokwa	Kobina Tahir Hammond	NPP		Kobina Tahir Hammond	NPP
3	Afigya Kwabre North	Collins Adomako-Mensah	NPP		Nana Amaniampong Marfo	NPP
4	Afigya Kwabre South	William Owuraku Aidoo	NPP		William Owuraku Aidoo	NPP
5	Afigya Sekyere East	Mavis Nkansah Boadu	NPP		Mavis Nkansah Boadu	NPP
6	Ahafo Ano North	Suleman Adamu Sanid	NPP		Suleman Adamu Sanid	NPP
7	Ahafo Ano South East	Francis Manu-Adabor	NPP		Francis Manu-Adabor	NPP
8	Ahafo Ano South West	Johnson Kwaku Adu	NPP		Johnson Kwaku Adu	NPP
9	Asante-Akim Central	Kwame Anyimadu - Antwi	NPP		Kwame Anyimadu - Antwi	NPP
10	Asante-Akim North	Andy Kwame Appiah-Kubi	NPP		Andy Kwame Appiah-Kubi	NPP
11	Asante-Akim South	Kwaku Asante-Boateng	NPP		Kwaku Asante - Boateng	NPP
12	Asawase	Mubarak Mohammed Muntaka	NDC		Muntaka Mohammed Mubarak (Minority Chief Whip)	NDC
13	Asokwa	Patricia Appiagyei	NPP		Patricia Appiagyei	NPP
14	Atwima-Kwanwoma	Kofi Amankwa-Manu	NPP		Kojo Appiah-Kubi	NPP
15	Atwima-Mponua	Isaac Kwame Asiamah	NPP		Isaac Kwame Asiamah	NPP
16	Atwima-Nwabiagya North	Benito Owusu Bio	NPP		Benito Owusu Bio	NPP
17	Atwima-Nwabiagya South	Emmanuel Adjei Anhwere	NPP		Emmanuel Adjei Anhwere	NPP
18	Bantama	Francis Asenso -Boakye	NPP		Daniel Okyem Aboagye	NPP
19	Bekwai	Joseph Osei-Owusu	NPP		Joseph Osei-Owusu (First Deputy Speaker)	NPP
20	Bosome-Freho	Akwasi Darko Boateng	NPP		Joyce Adwoa Akoh Dei	NPP
21	Bosomtwe	Yaw Osei Adutwum	NPP		Yaw Osei Adutwum	NPP
22	Effiduase-Asokore	Nana Ayew Afriyie	NPP		Nana Ayew Afriyie	NPP
23	Ejisu	John Ampotuah Kumah (Note: John Kumah died after a short illness leading to a by-election being scheduled for the Ejisu constituency.)	NPP		Kwabena Owusu Aduomi	NPP
24	Ejura-Sekyedumase	Muhammad Bawah Braimah	NDC		Muhammad Bawah Braimah	NDC
25	Fomena (Adansi North)	Andrew Asiamah Amoako (Second Deputy Speaker)	IND		(Note: Fomena - In October 2020, following the decision of the incumbent MP, Andrew Asiamah Amoako to stand as an independent candidate in the 2020 Ghanaian general election, the NPP, petitioned the Speaker of Parliament to expel him which he did.)vacant	
26	Juaben	Ama Pomaa Boateng	NPP		Ama Pomaa Boateng	NPP
27	Kumawu	(Note: Philip Basoah died on 28 March 2023, triggering a by-election.)Philip Basoah	NPP		Philip Basoah	NPP
28	Kwabre East	Francisca Oteng Mensah	NPP		Francisca Oteng Mensah	NPP
29	Kwadaso	Kingsley Nyarko	NPP		Samiu Kwadwo Nuamah	NPP
30	Mampong	Kwaku Ampratwum-Sarpong	NPP		Kwaku Ampratwum-Sarpong	NPP
31	Manhyia North	Akwasi Konadu	NPP		(Note: These MPs lost the primaries within their parties and therefore could not defend their seats in the 2020 election.)Collins Owusu Amankwah	NPP
32	Manhyia South	Matthew Opoku Prempeh	NPP		Matthew Opoku Prempeh	NPP
33	Manso Edubia	Frimpong Yaw Addo	NPP		Frimpong Yaw Addo	NPP
34	Manso Nkwanta	George Kwabena Obeng Takyi	NPP		Joseph Albert Quarm	NPP
35	New Edubease	Adams Abdul Salam	NDC		George Oduro	NPP
36	Nhyiaeso	Stephen Amoah	NPP		Kennedy Kwasi Kankam	NPP
37	Nsuta-Kwamang-Beposo	Adelaide Ntim	NPP		Kwame Asafu-Adjei	NPP
38	Obuasi East	Patrick Boakye-Yiadom	NPP		Patrick Boakye-Yiadom	NPP
39	Obuasi West	Kwaku Agyemang Kwarteng	NPP		Kwaku Agyemang Kwarteng	NPP
40	Odotobri	Emmanuel Akwasi Gyamfi	NPP		Emmanuel Akwasi Gyamfi	NPP
41	Offinso North	Augustine Collins Ntim	NPP		Augustine Collins Ntim	NPP
42	Offinso South	Isaac Yaw Opoku	NPP		Ben Abdallah Banda	NPP
43	Oforikrom	Emmanuel Marfo	NPP		Emmanuel Marfo	NPP
44	Old Tafo	Vincent Ekow Assafuah	NPP		Anthony Akoto Osei	NPP
45	Sekyere Afram Plains	Alex Adomako-Mensah	NDC		Alex Adomako-Mensah	NDC
46	Suame	Osei Kyei Mensah Bonsu	NPP		Osei Kyei Mensah Bonsu (Majority Leader)	NPP
47	Subin	Eugene Boakye Antwi	NPP		Eugene Boakye Antwi	NPP
	=== Bono Region - 12 seats ===					
No.	Constituency	Elected MP	Elected Party	Majority	Previous MP	Previous Party
1	Banda Ahenkro	Ahmed Ibrahim	NDC	82	Ahmed Ibrahim (First Deputy Minority Leader)	NDC
2	Berekum East	Nelson Kyeremeh	NPP	10,426	Kwabena Twum-Nuamah	NPP
3	Berekum West	Kwaku Agyenim-Boateng	NPP	949	Kwaku Agyenim-Boateng	NPP
4	Dormaa Central	Kwaku Agyeman-Manu	NPP	8,455	Kwaku Agyeman-Manu	NPP
5	Dormaa East	Paul Apreku Twum Barimah	NPP	5,296	William Kwasi Sabi	NPP
6	Dormaa West	Vincent Oppong Asamoah	NDC	1,606	Ali Maiga Halidu	NPP
7	Jaman North	Frederick Yaw Ahenkwah	NDC	4,169	Siaka Stevens	NPP
8	Jaman South	Williams Okofo-Dateh	NDC	1,903	Yaw Afful	NPP
9	Sunyani East	Kwasi Ameyaw Cheremeh	NPP	20,072	Kwasi Ameyaw Cheremeh (First Majoirity Chief Whip)	NPP
10	Sunyani West	Ignatius Baffour Awuah	NPP	3,408	Ignatius Baffour Awuah	NPP
11	Tain	Adama Sulemana	NDC	2,028	Gabriel Osei	NPP
12	Wenchi	Haruna Seidu	NDC	2,966	George Yaw Gyan-Baffuor	NPP
	=== Bono East Region - 11 seats ===					
No.	Constituency	Elected MP	Elected Party	Majority	Previous MP	Previous Party
1	Atebubu-Amantin	Sanja Nanja	NDC	9,991	Kofi Amoakohene	NPP
2	Kintampo North	Joseph Kwame Kumah	NDC	16,961	Kwasi Etu-Bonde	NDC
3	Kintampo South	Alexander Gyan	NPP	1,035	Felicia Adjei	NDC
4	Nkoranza North	Joseph Kwasi Mensah	NDC	4,146	Derrick Oduro	NPP
5	Nkoranza South	Emmanuel Kwadwo Agyekum	NDC	7,189	Charles Konadu-Yiadom	NPP
6	Pru East	Kwabena Donkor	NDC	9,021	Kwabena Donkor	NDC
7	Pru West	Stephen Jalulah	NPP	3,935	Masawud Mohammed	NDC
8	Sene East	Dominic Napare	NDC	5,977	Dominic Napare	NDC
9	Sene West	Kwame Twumasi Ampofo	NDC	16	Kwame Twumasi Ampofo	NDC
10	Techiman North	Elizabeth Ofosu-Adjare	NDC	2,244	Martin Oti Gyarko	NPP
11	Techiman South	Martin Kwaku Adjei-Mensah Korsah	NPP	477	Henry Yeboah Yiadom-Boachie	NPP
	=== Central Region - 23 seats ===					
No.	Constituency	Elected MP	Elected Party	Majority	Previous MP	Previous Party
1	Abura-Asebu-Kwamankese	Elvis Morris Donkoh	NPP	176	Elvis Morris Donkoh	NPP
2	Agona East	Queenstar Pokua Sawyerr	NDC	955	Queenstar Pokua Sawyerr	NDC
3	Agona West	Cynthia Mamle Morrison	NPP	2,840	Cynthia Mamle Morrison	NPP
4	Ajumako-Enyan-Essiam	Cassiel Ato Baah Forson	NDC	11,000	Cassiel Ato Baah Forson	NDC
5	Asikuma-Odoben-Brakwa	Alhassan Kobina Ghansah	NDC	2,721	Anthony Effah	NPP
6	Assin Central	Kennedy Ohene Agyapong	NPP	5,007	Kennedy Ohene Agyapong	NPP
7	Assin North	James Gyakye Quayson (Note: Quayson was ordered by the Supreme Court of Ghana to stop sitting as an MP on 13 April 2022. This follows him appealing a Cape Coast High Court decision nullifying his election and ordering a by-election.)	NDC	3,305	Abena Durowaa Mensah	NPP
8	Assin South	John Ntim Fordjour	NPP	1,320	John Ntim Fordjour	NPP
9	Awutu-Senya East	Mavis Hawa Koomson	NPP	5,553	Mavis Hawa Koomson	NPP
10	Awutu-Senya West	Gizella Tetteh Agbotui	NDC	2,876	George Nenyi Kojo Andah	NPP
11	Cape Coast North	Kwamena Minta Nyarku	NDC	1,329	Barbara Asher Ayisi	NPP
12	Cape Coast South	Kweku George Ricketts-Hagan	NDC	1,701	Kweku George Ricketts-Hagan	NDC
13	Effutu	Alexander Afenyo-Markin	NPP	14,743	Alexander Afenyo-Markin	NPP
14	Ekumfi	Abeiku Crentsil	NDC	2,569	Francis Kingsley Ato Codjoe	NPP
15	Gomoa Central	Naana Eyiah Quansah	NPP	5,959	Naana Eyiah Quansah	NPP
16	Gomoa East	Desmond De-Graft Paitoo	NDC	764	Kojo Asemanyi	NPP
17	Gomoa West	Richard Gyan Mensah	NDC	4,587	Alexander Kodwo Kom Abban	NPP
18	Hemang Lower Denkyira	Bright Wireko Brobbey	NPP	1,685	Bright Wireko Brobbey	NPP
19	Komenda-Edina-Eguafo-Abirem	Samuel Atta Mills	NDC	3,847	Samuel Atta Mills	NDC
20	Mfantseman	Ophelia Hayford	NPP	3,583	(Note: Mfantseman - 9 October 2020: The incumbent MP, Ekow Hayford of the NPP was murdered by armed robbers on the Nkusukum Mankessim-Abeadze Duadze Road on his way from a campaign trip. As his death is less than three months before the 2020 Ghanaian general election, Article 112 (5) of the 1992 Ghanaian Constitution stipulates that there should not be a by-election in the constituency.)vacant	
21	Twifo-Atii Morkwaa	T.D. David Vondee	NDC	1,822	Abraham Dwuma Oddom	NPP
22	Upper Denkyira East	Festus Awuah Kwofie	NPP	4,650	Nana Amoakoh	NPP
23	Upper Denkyira West	Daniel Ohene Darko	NDC	521	Samuel Nsowah-Djan	NPP
	=== Eastern Region - 33 seats ===					
No.	Constituency	Elected MP	Elected Party	Majority	Previous MP	Previous Party
1	Abetifi	Bryan Acheampong	NPP	15,499	Bryan Acheampong	NPP
2	Abirem	John Frimpong Osei	NPP	4,041	John Frimpong Osei	NPP
3	Abuakwa North	Gifty Twum Ampofo	NPP	2,102	Gifty Twum Ampofo	NPP
4	Abuakwa South	Samuel Atta Akyea	NPP	22,157	Samuel Atta Akyea	NPP
5	Achiase	Kofi Ahenkorah Marfo	NPP	5,642	Robert Kwasi Amoah	NPP
6	Afram Plains North	Betty Crosby Mensah	NDC	9,938	Betty Crosby Mensah	NDC
7	Afram Plains South	Joseph Appiah Boateng	NDC	8,946	Eric Owusu Osei	NDC
8	Akim Oda	Alexander Akwasi Acquah	NPP	19,118	William Agyapong Quaittoo	NPP
9	Akim Swedru	Kennedy Osei Nyarko	NPP	6,677	Kennedy Osei Nyarko	NPP
10	Akropong	Nana Ama Dokua Asiamah Adjei	NPP	16,141	Nana Ama Dokua Asiamah Adjei	NPP
11	Akwapim South	Osei Bonsu Amoah	NPP	10,010	Osei Bonsu Amoah	NPP
12	Akwatia	Henry Yiadom Boakye	NDC	1,157	Mercy Adu-Gyamfi	NPP
13	Asene-Akroso-Manso	George Kwame Aboagye	NPP	9,455	George Kwame Aboagye	NPP
14	Asuogyaman	Thomas Nyarko Ampem	NDC	1,238	Thomas Nyarko Ampem	NDC
15	Atiwa East	Abena Osei Asare	NPP	14,680	Abena Osei Asare	NPP
16	Atiwa West	Kwesi Amoako Atta	NPP	12,786	Kwesi Amoako Atta	NPP
17	Ayensuano	Teddy Safori Addi	NDC	241	Samuel Ayeh-Paye	NPP
18	Fanteakwa North	Kwabena Amankwa Asiamah	NPP	379	Kwabena Amankwa Asiamah	NPP
19	Fanteakwa South	Kofi Okyere-Agyekum	NPP	4,790	Kofi Okyere-Agyekum	NPP
20	Kade	Alexander Agyare	NPP	18,471	Kwabena Ohemeng-Tinyase	NPP
21	Lower Manya Krobo	Ebenezer Okletey Terlabi	NDC	4,962	Ebenezer Okletey Terlabi	NDC
22	Lower West Akim	Charles Acheampong	NPP	7,783	Eyiah Kyei Baffour	NPP
23	Mpraeso	Davis Ansah Opoku	NPP	16,054	Seth Kwame Acheampong	NPP
24	New Juaben North	Kwasi Boateng Adjei	NPP	12,382	Kwasi Boateng Adjei	NPP
25	New Juaben South	Michael Okyere Baafi	NPP	27,698	Mark Assibey-Yeboah	NPP
26	Nkawkaw	Joseph Frempong	NPP	29,795	Eric Kwakye Darfour	NPP
27	Nsawam Adoagyiri	Frank Annoh-Dompreh	NPP	3,242	Frank Annoh-Dompreh	NPP
28	Ofoase-Ayirebi	Kojo Oppong-Nkrumah	NPP	9,994	Kojo Oppong-Nkrumah	NPP
29	Okere	Daniel Botwe	NPP	9,852	Daniel Botwe	NPP
30	Suhum	Kwadjo Asante	NPP	14,857	Frederick Opare-Ansah	NPP
31	Upper Manya Krobo	Bismark Tetteh Nyarko	NDC	2,660	Joseph Tetteh	NPP
32	Upper West Akim	Frederick Obeng Adom	NPP	1,667	Ohene Assifo Derek Bekoe	NDC
33	Yilo Krobo	Albert Tetteh Nyakotey	NDC	5,337	Magnus Kofi Amoatey	NDC
	=== Greater Accra Region - 34 seats ===					
No.	Constituency	Elected MP	Elected Party	Majority	Previous MP	Previous Party
1	Ablekuma Central	Dan Abdul-latif	NDC	204	Ebenezer Gilbert Nii Narh Nartey	NPP
2	Ablekuma North	Sheila Bartels	NPP	24,840	Nana Akua Owusu Afriyie	NPP
3	Ablekuma South	Alfred Okoe Vanderpuije	NDC	13,698	Alfred Okoe Vanderpuije	NDC
4	Ablekuma West	Ursula G Owusu	NPP	6,630	Ursula G Owusu	NPP
5	Ada	Comfort Doyoe Cudjoe-Ghansah	NDC	22,330	Comfort Doyoe Cudjoe-Ghansah (Second Deputy Minority Whip)	NDC
6	Adenta	Mohammed Adamu Ramadan	NDC	14,181	Asamoa Yaw Buaben	NPP
7	Amasaman	Akwasi Owusu Afrifa-Mensa	NPP	3,119	Emmanuel Nii Okai Laryea	NDC
8	Anyaa-Sowutuom	Dickson Adomako Kissi	NPP	29,986	Shirley Ayorkor Botchwey	NPP
9	Ashaiman	Ernest Henry Norgbey	NDC	27,586	Ernest Henry Norgbey	NDC
10	Ayawaso Central	Henry Quartey	NPP	4,640	Henry Quartey	NPP
11	Ayawaso East	Naser Toure Mahama	NDC	8,617	Naser Toure Mahama	NDC
12	Ayawaso North	Yussif Issaka Jajah	NDC	11,397	Yussif Issaka Jajah	NDC
13	Ayawaso West Wuogon	Lydia Alhassan	NPP	2,373	Lydia Alhassan	NPP
14	Bortianor-Ngleshie-Amanfro	Sylvester Tetteh	NPP	5,304	Habib Saad	NPP
15	Dade Kotopon	Rita Naa Odoley Sowah	NDC	6,505	Vincent Sowah-Odote	NPP
16	Dome Kwabenya	Sarah Adwoa Safo	NPP	12,779	Sarah Adwoa Safo (Deputy Majority Leader)	NPP
17	Domeabra-Obom	Sophia Karen Edem Ackuaku	NDC	8,094	Sophia Karen Edem Ackuaku	NDC
18	Korle Klottey	Zanetor Agyeman-Rawlings	NDC	8,189	Zanetor Agyeman-Rawlings	NDC
19	Kpone-Katamanso	Joseph Akuerteh Tettey	NDC	12,209	Joseph Nii Laryea Afotey Agbo	NDC
20	Krowor	Agnes Naa Momo Lartey	NDC	9,246	Elizabeth Afoley Quaye	NPP
21	Ledzokuku	Benjamin Narteh Ayiku	NDC	1,866	Benard Oko-Boye	NPP
22	Madina	Francis-Xavier Kojo Sosu	NDC	15,142	Abubakar Boniface Siddique	NPP
23	Ningo-Prampram	Samuel George Nartey	NDC	28,750	Samuel George Nartey	NDC
24	Odododiodio	Edwin Nii Lante Vanderpuye	NDC	6,559	Nii Lantey Vanderpuye	NDC
25	Okaikwei Central	Patrick Yaw Boamah	NPP	9,013	Patrick Yaw Boamah	NPP
26	Okaikwei North	Theresa Lardi Awuni	NDC	2,039	Issah Fuseini	NPP
27	Okaikwei South	Dakoa Newman	NPP	14,374	Ahmed Arthur	NPP
28	Sege	Christian Corleytey Otuteye	NDC	1,794	Christian Corleytey Otuteye	NDC
29	Shai-Osudoku	Linda Obenewaa Akweley Ocloo	NDC	16,616	Linda Obenewaa Akweley Ocloo	NDC
30	Tema Central	Yves Hanson-Nortey	NPP	14,393	Kofi Brako	NPP
31	Tema East	Isaac Ashai Odamtten	NDC	9,348	Daniel Nii Kwartey Titus-Glover	NPP
32	Tema West	Carlos Kingsley Ahenkora	NPP	2,533	Carlos Kingsley Ahenkora	NPP
33	Trobu	Moses Anim	NPP	28,398	Moses Anim (Second Deputy Majority Whip)	NPP
34	Weija Gbawe	Tina Gifty Naa Ayeley Mensah	NPP	4,657	Tina Gifty Naa Ayeley Mensah	NPP
	=== Northern Region - 18 seats ===					
No.	Constituency	Elected MP	Elected Party	Majority	Previous MP	Previous Party
1	Bimbilla	Dominc Aduna Bingab Nitiwul	NPP	12,227	Dominc Aduna Bingab Nitiwul	NPP
2	Gushegu	Alhassan Tampuli Sulemana	NPP	2,346	Ziblim Iddi	NPP
3	Karaga	Mohammed Amin Adam	NPP	8,645	Alhassan Sualihu Dandaawa	NDC
4	Kpandai	Daniel Nsala Wakpal	NDC	2,072	Matthew Nyindam (First Deputy Majority Whip)	NPP
5	Kumbungu	Hamza Adam	NDC	6,035	Ras Mubarak	NDC
6	Mion	Musah Abdul-Aziz Ayaba	NDC	7,394	Mohammed Abdul Aziz	NDC
7	Nanton	Mohammed Hardi Tuferu	NPP	3,446	Mohammed Hardi Tuferu	NPP
8	Saboba	Joseph Bukari Nikpe	NDC	2,010	Charles Binipom Bintin	NPP
9	Sagnarigu	Alhassan Bashir Fuseini	NDC	8,555	Alhassan Bashir Fuseini	NDC
10	Savelugu	Jacob Iddriss Abdulai	NDC	99	Abdul-Samed Muhamed Gunu	NPP
11	Tamale Central	Ibrahim Murtala Muhammed	NDC	7,569	Alhassan Inusah Fuseini	NDC
12	Tamale North	Suhuyini Alhassan Sayibu	NDC	11,929	Suhuyini Alhassan Sayibu	NDC
13	Tamale South	Haruna Iddrisu	NDC	45,890	Haruna Iddrisu (Minority Leader)	NDC
14	Tatale-Sanguli	Thomas Mbomba	NPP	2,478	Simon Acheampong Tampi	NDC
15	Tolon	Habib Iddrisu	NPP	9,284	Wahab Wumbei Suhuyini	NPP
16	Wulensi	Abukari Dawuni	NPP	1,000	Thomas Donkor Ogajah	NPP
17	Yendi	Umar Farouk Aliu Mahama	NPP	15,869	Mohammad Habibu Tijani	NPP
18	Zabzugu	John Bennam Jabaah	NPP	2,949	Alhassan Umar	NDC
	=== North East Region - 6 seats ===					
No.	Constituency	Elected MP	Elected Party	Majority	Previous MP	Previous Party
1	Bunkpurugu	Abed-nego Bandim	NDC	1,334	Solomon Namliit Boar	NPP
2	Chereponi	Abdul-Razak Tahidu	NPP	6,941	Samuel Abdulai Jabanyite	NDC
3	Nalerigu Gambaga	Issifu Seidu	NDC	5,407	Alima Hajia Mahama	NPP
4	Walewale	Lariba Abudu	NPP	1,679	Sagre Bambangi	NPP
5	Yagaba-Kubori (Walewale West)	Mustapha Ussif	NPP	8,760	Abdul-Rauf Tanko Ibrahim	NDC
6	Yunyoo	Oscar Liwaal	NPP	2,926	Naabu Joseph Bipoba	NDC
	=== Oti Region - 8 seats ===					
No.	Constituency	Elected MP	Elected Party	Majority	Previous MP	Previous Party
1	Akan	Yao Gomado	NDC	6,017	Azuz Abdl Amuniru	NDC
2	Biakoye	Kwadwo Nyanpon Aboagye	NDC	8,268	Kwadwo Nyanpon Aboagye	NDC
3	Buem	Iddie Kofi Adams	NDC	11,685	Daniel Kwesi Ashiamah	NDC
4	Krachi East	Wisdom Gidisu	NDC	527	Michael Yaw Gyato	NPP
5	Krachi Nchumuru	Solomon Kuyon	NDC	1,084	John Majisi	NDC
6	Krachi West	Helen Adjoa Ntoso	NDC	496	Helen Adjoa Ntoso	NDC
7	Nkwanta North	John Kwabena Bless Oti	NDC	1,601	John Oti Kwabena Bless	NDC
8	Nkwanta South	Geoffrey Kini	NDC	8,917	Geoffrey Kini	NDC
	=== Savannah Region - 7 seats ===					
No.	Constituency	Elected MP	Elected Party	Majority	Previous MP	Previous Party
1	Bole Bamboi	Yusif Sulemana	NDC	13,765	Yusif Sulemana	NDC
2	Daboya-Mankarigu	Mahama Asei Seini	NPP	4,640	Shaibu Mahama Kalba	NDC
3	Damango	Samuel Abu Jinapor	NPP	2,711	Adam Mutawakilu	NDC
4	Salaga North	Alhassan Abdallah Ididi	NPP	954	Alhassan Mumuni	NDC
5	Salaga South	Zuwera Mohammed Ibrahimah	NDC	1,439	Salifu Adam Braimah	NPP
6	Sawla-Tuna-Kalba	Andrew Dari Chiwetey	NDC	10,602	Andrew Dari Chiwetey	NDC
7	Yapei-Kusawgu	John Abdulai Jinapor	NDC	8,660	John Abdulai Jinapor	NDC
	=== Upper East Region - 15 seats ===					
No.	Constituency	Elected MP	Elected Party	Majority	Previous MP	Previous Party
1	Bawku Central	Mahama Ayariga	NDC	2,324	Mahama Ayariga	NDC
2	Binduri	Abdulai Abanga	NPP	454	Robert Baba Kuganab-Lem	NDC
3	Bolgatanga Central	Isaac Adongo	NDC	16,599	Isaac Adongo	NDC
4	Bolgatanga East	Dominic Akuritinga Ayine	NDC	6,352	Dominic Akuritinga Ayine	NDC
5	Bongo	Edward Abambire Bawa	NDC	8,992	Edward Abambire Bawa	NDC
6	Builsa North	James Agalga	NDC	4,795	James Agalga	NDC
7	Builsa South	Clement Apaak	NDC	1,777	Clement Apaak	NDC
8	Chiana-Paga	Thomas Adda Dalu	NDC	6,414	Rudolph Nsowine Amenga-Etego	NDC
9	Garu	Akuka Albert Alalzuuga	NDC	3,063	Akuka Albert Alalzuuga	NDC
10	Nabdam	Mark Kurt Nawaane	NDC	2,918	Mark Kurt Nawaane	NDC
11	Navrongo Central	Sampson Tangombu Chiragia	NDC	11,126	Joseph Kofi Adda	NPP
12	Pusiga	Laadi Ayii Ayamba	NDC	63	Laadi Ayii Ayamba	NDC
13	Talensi	Benson Tongo Baba	NDC	3,618	Benson Tongo Baba	NDC
14	Tempane	Akanvariva Lydia Lamisi	NDC	4,477	Joseph Dindiok Kpemka	NPP
15	Zebilla	Cletus Apul Avoka	NDC	17,619	Frank Fuseini Adongo	NPP
	=== Upper West Region - 11 seats ===					
No.	Constituency	Elected MP	Elected Party	Majority	Previous MP	Previous Party
1	Daffiama-Bussie-Issa	Sebastian Sandaare	NDC	16,297	Issa Sebastian N. Sandaare	NDC
2	Jirapa	Cletus Seidu Dapilaah	NDC	15,809	Francis Bawaana Dakura	NDC
3	Lambussie	Bakye Yelviel Baligi	NPP	630	Edward Kaale-Ewola Dery	NDC
4	Lawra	Bede A. Zeideng	NDC	2,970	Anthony N-Yoh Abayifaa Karbo	NPP
5	Nadowli Kaleo	Sumah Anthony Mwinikaara	NDC	16,297	Alban Bagbin (Second Deputy Speaker)	NDC
6	Nandom	Ambrose Dery	NPP	4,127	Ambrose Dery	NPP
7	Sissala East	Issahaku Amidu Chinnia	NPP	870	Abbas Ridwan Dauda	NPP
8	Sissala West	Mohammed Adams Sukparu	NDC	3,737	Patrick Al-Hassan Adamah	NPP
9	Wa Central	Abdul-Rashid Hassan Pelpuo	NDC	6,202	Abdul-Rashid Hassan Pelpuo	NDC
10	Wa East	Godfred Seidu Jasaw	NDC	7,182	Godfrey Tangu Bayon	NPP
11	Wa West	Peter Lanchene Toobu	NDC	14,407	Joseph Yieleh Chireh	NDC
	=== Volta Region - 18 seats ===					
No.	Constituency	Elected MP	Elected Party	Majority	Previous MP	Previous Party
1	Adaklu	Kwame Governs Agbodza	NDC	10,902	Kwame Governs Agbodza	NDC
2	Afadjato South	Angela Oforiwaa Alorwu-Tay	NDC	11,901	Angela Oforiwaa Alorwu-Tay	NDC
3	Agotime-Ziope	Charles Akwesi Agbeve	NDC	16,484	Charles Kwesi Agbeve	NDC
4	Akatsi North	Peter Kwasi Nortsu-Kotoe	NDC	5,195	Peter Nortsu-Kotoe	NDC
5	Akatsi South	Bernard Ahiafor	NDC	26,070	Bernard Ahiafor	NDC
6	Anlo	Richard Kwame Sefe	NDC	32,920	Clement Kofi Humado	NDC
7	Central Tongu	Alexander Roosevelt Hottordze	NDC	24,874	Alexander R. Hottordze	NDC
8	Ho Central	Benjamin Komla Kpodo	NDC	57,119	Benjamin Komla Kpodo	NDC
9	Ho West	Emmanuel Kwasi Bedzrah	NDC	18,442	Emmanuel Kwasi Bedzrah	NDC
10	Hohoe	John Peter Amewu	NPP	5,131	Bernice Adiku Heloo	NDC
11	Keta	Kwame Dzudzorli Gakpey	NDC	26,433	Richard Quashigah	NDC
12	Ketu North	James Klutse Avedzi	NDC	4,128	James Klutse Avedzi (Deputy Minority Leader)	NDC
13	Ketu South	Dzifa Gomashie	NDC	69,760	Fifi Fiavi Franklin Kwetey	NDC
14	Kpando	Adjoa Della Sowah	NDC	5,361	Della Sowah	NDC
15	North Dayi	Joycelyn Tetteh	NDC	9,969	Joycelyn Tetteh	NDC
16	North Tongu	Samuel Okudzeto Ablakwa	NDC	37,699	Samuel Okudzeto Ablakwa	NDC
17	South Dayi	Rockson-Nelson Etse Dafeamekpor	NDC	12,361	K. E. Rockson-Nelson Dafeamekpor	NDC
18	South Tongu	Wisdom Kobena Mensah Woyome	NDC	38,737	Kobena Mensah Wisdom Woyome	NDC
	=== Western Region - 17 seats ===					
No.	Constituency	Elected MP	Elected Party	Majority	Previous MP	Previous Party
1	Ahanta West	Ebenezer Kojo Kum	NPP	3,989	Ebenezer Kojo Kum	NPP
2	Amenfi Central	Peter Yaw Kwakye Ackah	NDC	4,174	Peter Yaw Kwakye Ackah	NDC
3	Amenfi East	Nicholas Amankwah	NDC	6,261	Patrick Bogyako-Saim	NPP
4	Amenfi West	Eric Afful	NDC	2,547	Eric Afful	NDC
5	Effia	Joseph Cudjoe	NPP	6,043	Joseph Cudjoe	NPP
6	Ellembelle	Emmanuel Armah-Kofi Buah	NDC	8,184	Emmanuel Armah-Kofi Buah	NDC
7	Essikado-Ketan	Joe Ghartey	NPP	2,174	Joe Ghartey	NPP
8	Evalue-Ajomoro-Gwira	Kofi Arko Nokoe	NDC	2,533	Catherine Abelema Afeku	NPP
9	Jomoro	Dorcas Affo-Toffey	NDC	4,467	Paul Essien	NPP
10	Kwesimintsim	Prince Hamidu Armah	NPP	11,374	Joseph Mensah	NPP
11	Mpohor	Kobina Abbam Aboah Sanie	NPP	2,201	Alex Kofi Agyekum	NPP
12	Prestea-Huni Valley	Robert Wisdom Cudjoe	NDC	17,397	Barbara Oten-Gyasi	NPP
13	Sekondi	Andrew Kofi Egyapa Mercer	NPP	6,949	Andrew Kofi Egyapa Mercer	NPP
14	Shama	Samuel Erickson Abakah	NPP	3,100	Ato Panford	NPP
15	Takoradi	Kwabena Okyere Darko-Mensah	NPP	13,839	Kwabena Okyere Darko-Mensah	NPP
16	Tarkwa-Nsuaem	George Mireku Duker	NPP	101	George Mireku Duker	NPP
17	Wassa East	Isaac Adjei Mensah	NDC	2,785	Isaac Adjei Mensah	NDC
	=== Western North Region - 9 seats ===					
No.	Constituency	Elected MP	Elected Party	Majority	Previous MP	Previous Party
1	Aowin	Oscar Ofori Larbi	NDC	5,413	Mathias Kwame Ntow	NDC
2	Bia East	Richard Acheampong	NDC	2,291	Richard Acheampong	NDC
3	Bia West	Augustine Tawiah	NDC	8,119	Augustine Tawiah	NDC
4	Bibiani-Anhwiaso-Bekwai	Alfred Obeng Boateng	NPP	17,281	Kingsley Aboagye-Gyedu	NPP
5	Bodi	Sampson Ahi	NDC	2,614	Sampson Ahi	NDC
6	Juabeso	Kwabena Mintah Akandoh	NDC	8,119	Kwabena Mintah Akandoh	NDC
7	Sefwi-Akontombra	Alex Tetteh Djornobuah	NPP	3,423	Alex Tetteh Djornobuah	NPP
8	Sefwi-Wiawso	Kwaku Afriyie	NPP	72	Kwaku Afriyie	NPP
9	Suaman	Joseph Betino	NDC	414	Stephen Michael Essuah Kofi Ackah	NDC

== By-elections ==
- Kumawu - 23 May 2023 - A by-election was conducted by the Electoral Commission of Ghana. This followed the sudden death of Philip Basoah on 28 March 2023. There were two independent candidates bearing the same name. Ernest Yaw Anim of the New Patriotic Party (NPP) polled 15,264 votes (70.91%) while Kwasi Amankwaa of the National Democratic Congress (NDC) polled 3,723 votes (17.29%).
- Assin North - 27 June 2023. A by-election was conducted to replace James Gyakye Quayson who was removed after losing his appeal at the Cape Coast High Court. Quayson won the by-election to take back the seat he had lost in the courts in April 2022. He won 17,245 votes (57.56%) beating his closest rival from the NPP Charles Opoku who had 12,630 votes (42.15%). Quayson was thus re-elected.
- Ejisu - Following the death of John Kumah the incumbent MP, the Electoral Commission held a bye election in April 2024 that saw NPP's Kwabena Boateng clinch back the seat for his part with 55.8% of the total votes cast. His closest contender, a former MP for the constituency, Kwabena Aduomi secured 43.3% of the total votes cast.

== Speaker Declares Four Seats Vacant ==
The speaker of Parliament on 17 October 17 2024 declared four seats in Parliament vacant following the decision of current holders to go independent from the ticket of the political party on which they were initially elected. The affected seats were NDC's Peter Yaw Kwakye Ackah of Amenfi Central constituency in the Western Region, Andrew Amoakoh Asiamah of Fomena in the Ashanti Region, Kojo Asante, NPP MP for Suhum in the Eastern Region, and NPP's Cynthia Morrison of Agona West constituency.

== Notes ==
- Non-returning members (MPs) - 111 MPs in all will not return to Parliament when it opens on 7 January 2021 for varied reasons. For the NPP, 4 MPs decided to retire from Parliament while 41 lost in the NPP primaries. In the election itself, a further 33 lost their seats meaning 78 NPP MPs out of 169 from the previous parliament will not be present. For the NDC, 7 MPs chose to retire and 8 lost the primaries. The election resulted in another 18 losing their seats so 33 NDC MPs in all from the 7th Parliament will be absent. Those from the NPP who retired were Anthony Akoto Osei, MP for Tafo Pankrono, Kwabena Appiah-Pinkrah, MP for Akrofuom, Ziblim Iddi MP for Gushegu and Shirley Ayorkor Botchwey MP for Anyaa Sowutuom. The 7 from the NDC who retired were Alban Bagbin, MP for Nadowli, Richard Quashigah, MP for Keta, Inusah Fuseini, Tamale Central, Bernice Adiku Heloo, Hohoe, Magnus Kofi Amoatey, Yilo Krobo, Clement Kofi Humado, Anlo and Fiifi Kwetey for Ketu South.
- Fomena - In October 2020, Andrew Asiamah Amoako the incumbent MP, who was one of the 41 to lose the NPP primaries opted to stand as an independent candidate. This led to him being sacked by the party as by registering as an independent candidate, the party no longer recognised him as a member. The NPP then wrote to the Speaker of Parliament stating that he was no longer a member of the party and could not take his seat in parliament. The Speaker, Mike Oquaye subsequently declared the Fomena seat vacant in line with Article 97(1)(g) of the constitution. President Nana Akufo-Addo during the election campaign suggested to the people of Fomena that they would not benefit from having an independent MP and tried to woo him back. It is claimed Akufo-Addo cited Amoako's alleged disrespect for him as the reason why he could not work with him. Amoako however won his seat as an independent.
- Mfantseman - Following the murder of the incumbent MP by armed robbers during the election campaign, the seat was declared vacant due to there being less than three months before the election. Ophelia Hayford, widow of Ekow Hayford contested in place of her husband and won the seat.
- Assin North - On 13 April 2022, the Supreme Court of Ghana ruled by a 5-2 majority decision that James Gyakye Quayson could not continue to sit in the house as MP for Assin North. This was after he had appealed a Cape Coast High Court ruling that had nullified his election and ordered a by-election following a petition.
- Four first-time MPs were alleged to have continued receiving salaries from their previous jobs although they had taken their seats in parliament. Three of them, Stephen Jalulah of Pru West, Alhassan Iddi for Salaga North, and Alexander Gyan of Kintampo South have apparently returned the excess payments while Sylvester Tetteh of Bortianor-Ngleshie-Amanfro has denied that he has collected any double salary.
- Ejisu - The MP for Ejisu, John Kumah died on 7 March 2024 after a short illness. He was also the Deputy Minister for Finance in the NPP government of Nana Akufo-Addo.
- Motion for MPs representing political parties switching allegiance to stand as independents or for other parties to vacate their seats - Haruna Iddrisu (NDC), MP for Tamale South wrote to the Speaker of Parliament invoking Article 97 (1) (g) which requires the seat of a sitting MP to be declared vacant if they leave the party on whose ticket they were voted into parliament. The MPs in question are Peter Yaw Kwakye Ackah (NDC), Amenfi Central MP, Kwadjo Asante (NPP), Suhum MP, Cynthia Mamle Morrison (NPP), Agona West MP and Andrew Asiamah Amoako (Independent), Fomena MP and Second Deputy Speaker. Alexander Afenyo-Markin (NPP), majority leader and MP for Effutu indicated that he had filed an application at the Supreme Court of Ghana to settle the case. The concern is that the Independent candidate votes with NPP which gives the NPP a majority of 1. If all four MPs vacate their seats, the majority loses 3 votes while NDC loses 1 leaving the NDC with a majority of 1 in the house as the NPP and NDC have 137 members each. The Speaker, Alban Bagbin after listening to the debate in the house, asked to be given two days to come up with a ruling on the matter. The Speaker ruled on 17 October 2024 that the four MPs have vacated their seats by notification of polls to stand for different parties than they stand for currently, they were deemed to have vacated their seats in parliament. The Supreme Court of Ghana presided over by the Chief Justice Gertrude Torkornoo granted a stay of execution of the Speaker's ruling pending a full determination of the suit filed before it.

== See also ==
- 2020 Ghanaian general election
- Parliament of Ghana
- List of general elections in Ghana
- List of female members of the Eighth Parliament of the Fourth Republic of Ghana
