= Simon Acheampong Tampi =

Ghanaian politician (born 1975)

Member of the Ghana Parliament for Tatale-Sanguli Constituency

Personal details
- Born: 24 April 1975 (age 51)
- Party: National Democratic Congress

Simon Acheampong Tampi (born 14 April 1975) is a Ghanaian politician and a member of the Seventh Parliament of the Fourth Republic of Ghana representing the Tatale-Sanguli constituency in the Northern Region on the ticket of the National Democratic Congress.

== Career ==
He was born on 14 April 1975. Between 1996 and 2002, Tampi was a surveyor at Nulux Plantation Limited and also a teacher at Nakpalu-Borle Primary School between 2005 and 2016.

== Education ==
He has an advanced B.S. certificate from Sunyani Polytechnic, a certificate in vocational and technical education from the University of Education, Winneba and a B.S certificate in Construction Education.

== Politics ==
Tampi is a member of National Democratic Congress and represent Tatale-Sanguli in the Seventh Parliament of the Fourth Republic of Ghana.

=== 2016 election ===
Tampi contested the Tatale-Sanguli constituency parliamentary seat on the ticket of the National Democratic Congress during the 2016 Ghanaian general election and won with 9,371 votes representing 38.81% of the total votes. He was elected over Thomas Mbomba of the New Patriotic Party, James Cecil Yanwube (IND), Wumborapak Nkpebe Peter of the Progressive People's Party and Serchen Komba of the Convention People's Party. They obtained 7,027 votes, 6,477 votes, 791 votes and 482 votes respectively, equivalent to 29.10%, 26.82%, 3.28% and 2.00% of the total votes respectively.

==== 2020 election ====
Tampi again contested the Tatale- Sanguli (Ghana parliament constituency) parliamentary seat on the ticket of National Democratic Congress during the 2020 Ghanaian general election but lost the election to Thomas Mbomba of the New Patriotic Party.
