= Edward Abambire Bawa =

Ghanaian politician

Hon. Edward Abambire Bawa MP
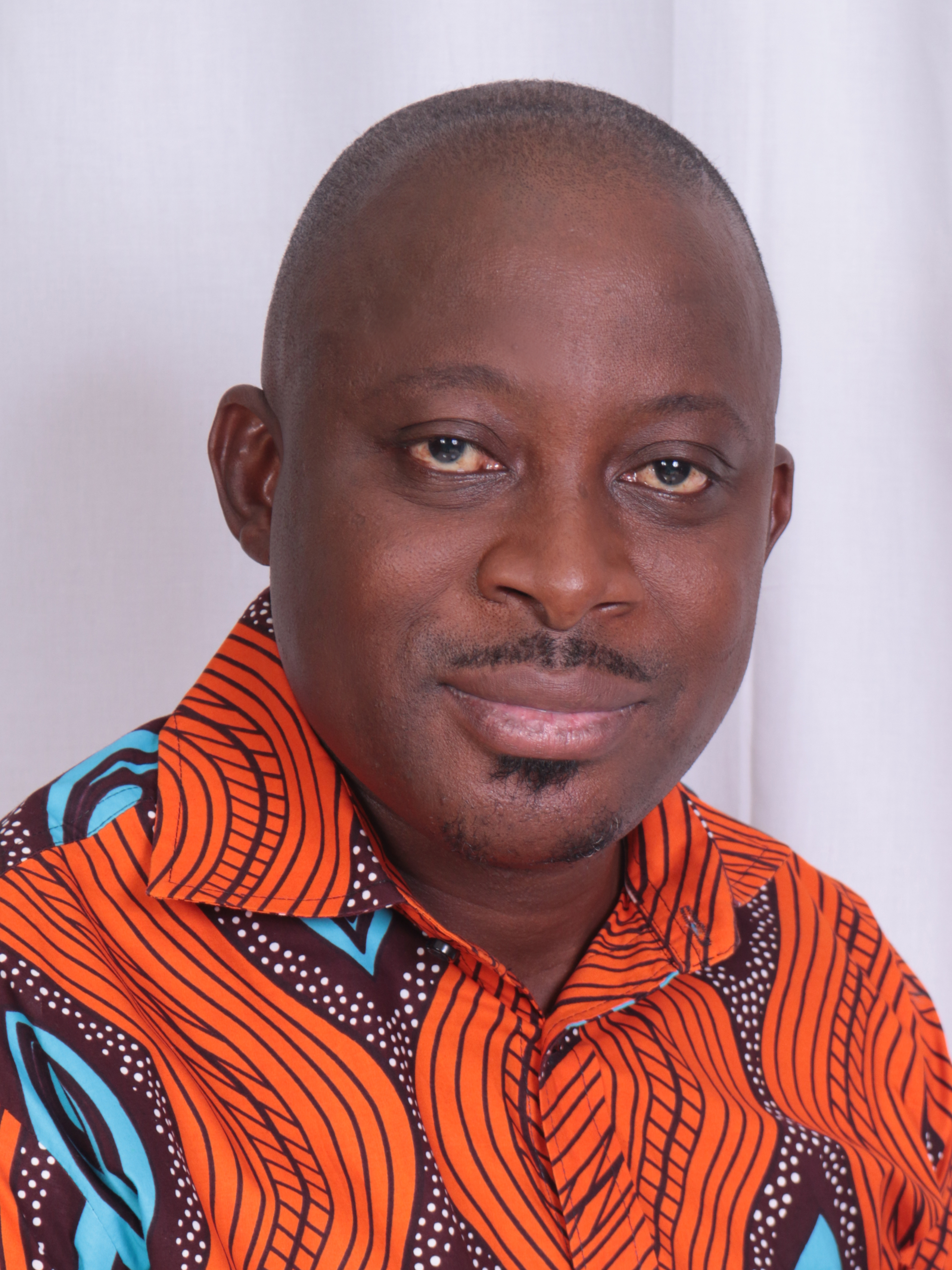

Member of the Ghana Parliament for Bongo Constituency
- In office 2017–2024

Personal details
- Born: 1 September 1973 (age 52) Bongo Lungu, Ghana
- Party: National Democratic Congress

Edward Abambire Bawa (born 1 September 1973) is a Ghanaian politician who was a member of the Seventh Parliament of the Fourth Republic of Ghana and served as a member of the Eighth Parliament of the Fourth Republic of Ghana representing the Bongo (Ghana parliament constituency) in the Upper East Region of Ghana on the ticket of the National Democratic Congress.

He is currently the Acting Chief Executive Director of theGhana national Petroleum Commission (GNPC).

== Early life and education ==
Edward Abambire Bawa was born and hails from Bongo-Lungu in the Upper East Region of Ghana. Edward Abambire Bawa passed his Common Entrance Examination in 1986 which enabled him obtain his Ordinary Level(O – Level) in 1991 and Advanced Level(A – Level) in 1993. Edward Abambire Bawa proceeded to have his Bachelor of Education in Chemistry from the University of Cape Coast, Ghana in the year 2002, Master of Business Administration in Business Finance from the University of Liverpool in the year 2007, Certificate in Development Communications in the year 2012, Certificate in Risk Communications in the year 2014. He again had a Postgraduate certificate from Harvard School of Public Health, a Postgraduate certificate from the University of Southern California and a Postgraduate certificate from the Setym International.

== Career ==
Edward Abambire Bawa is the Head of Communication for World Bank project (oil and gas capacity building project) of the Ministry of Petroleum in Accra, Ghana. Edward Abambire Bawa is now working as the Member of parliament (MP) for Bongo Constituency in the Upper East Region of Ghana on the ticket of the National Democratic Congress.

== Political life ==
Edward Abambire Bawa contested and won the 2016 NDC parliamentary primaries for Bongo Constituency in the Upper East Region of Ghana. Edward Abambire Bawa proceeded to win the parliamentary seat in his constituency (Bongo Constituency) in the Upper East Region of Ghana during the 2016 Ghanaian general elections on the ticket of the National Democratic Congress to join the Seventh (7th) Parliament of the Fourth Republic of Ghana with 18,442 votes (47.9%) against Gabriel Nsoh Ade Agana of the New Patriotic Party who had 6,800 votes (17.7%), Afari George A-Engbinge of the Progressive People's Party(PPP) who also had 12,932 votes (33.6%) and Awillum Ebenezer Awine of the Convention People's Party(CPP) who had 295 votes (0.8%).

Edward Abambire Bawa again contested and won the 2020 NDC parliamentary primaries for Bongo Constituency in the Upper East Region of Ghana with 590 votes against Dr. Rainer Akumperigya who had 291 votes. Edward Abambire Bawa again proceeded to win in the 2020 Ghanaian general elections on the ticket of the National Democratic Congress to join the Eighth (8th) Parliament of the Fourth Republic of Ghana with 26,268 votes (57.7%) against Ayinbisa Ayamga Peter of the New Patriotic Party who had 17,276 votes (37.9%), Afari George A-Engbinge of the Progressive People's Party(PPP) who had 1,548 votes (3.4%) and Akamah Richard of the Ghana Union Movement(GUM) who had 439 votes (1.0%).

Edward Abambire Bawa was booted out of parliament in the NDC Primaries and he was beaten by private legal practitioner Lawyer Charles Bawadua on Saturday, 13 May 2023 which made him lost his bid to be reelected to Parliament to represent the Bongo Constituency. Lawyer Charles Bawadua won with 535 votes, Edward Abambire Bawa polled 509 votes and Avea Ephram Nsoh also polled 75 votes.

=== Committees ===
Edward Abambire Bawa was a member of the Poverty Reduction strategy Committee. He was also a member of the Mines and Energy Committee of the Eighth (8th) Parliament of the Fourth Republic of Ghana.

== Personal life ==
Edward Abambire Bawa is a Christian.

== Philanthropy ==
Edward Abambire Bawa donated hand sanitizers, hand wash basins and nose masks to fight coronavirus(COVID-19) in his constituency (Bongo Constituency) in the Upper East Region of Ghana. Edward Abambire Bawa took the fight against Coronavirus in the country to a different level.
