= Achiase (Ghana parliament constituency) =

Ghana parliament constituency

- constituency for the Parliament of Ghana
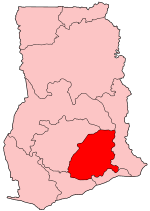
- District: Achiase District
- Region: Eastern Region of Ghana

Current constituency
- Party: New Patriotic Party
- MP: Kofi Ahenkorah Marfo

Achiase constituency was created in 2012 prior to the December elections. The parliamentary seat was contested in 2012 by Robert Kwasi Amoah (a teacher) of the NPP and Dr. Kwasi Akyem Apea-Kubi (a specialist gynaecologist) of the NDC and was won by Robert Kwasi Amoah. Kofi Ahenkorah Marfo is the member of parliament for the constituency.

The Constituency was born out of a re-demarcation of the Akim Swedru constituency, which became Achiase Constituency and Akim Swedru Constituency.

In the 2016 elections, the incumbent - Robert Kwasi Amoah - retained his seat in parliament after a challenge by S.Y Kwakye (an economist).

Heading into the 2020 general elections, Mr. Robert Amoah had lost his mandate to contest as the MP at the NPP's primaries to Kofi Ahenkorah Marfo (the NPP's former constituency chairman). Mr. Marfo won the general elections to become the Member of Parliament, having defeated Dr. Kwasi Akyem Apea-Kubi who was widely tipped to win given that it was his 4th time trying (2000, 2008, 2012 and 2020).

== List of MPs ==
Achiase Constituency
Year	MP Name	Political Party	Votes	President
2012	Robert Kwasi Amoah	New Patriotic Party	14,395	John Mahama
2016	Robert Kwasi Amoah	New Patriotic Party	14,695	Nana Akufo-Addo
2020	Kofi Ahenkorah Marfo	New Patriotic Party	14,796	Nana Akufo-Addo
2024	Kofi Ahenkorah Marfo	New Patriotic Party	12,076	John Mahama
