= Ogbodjo =

Ogbojo
- Town
- Country: Ghana
- Region: Greater Accra Region
- Municipality: Adentan Municipality

Government
  - Chief: Nii Torgbor Obodai II

Ogbojo is a town in the Adentan Municipality in the Greater Accra Region of Ghana. The town houses the Institute of Local Government Studies.

Nii Torgbor Obodai II is the chief of Ogbojo.
