= Institute of Local Government Studies =

Institution in Ogbojo, Ghana

The Institute of Local Government Studies (ILGS) is a Government of Ghana institution established in 1999 with the mandate to educate students in public management and development. The institution is backed by Act of Parliament, 647 of 2003. The institute is under the Ministry of Local Government and Rural Development. The institute is located in Ogbojo near Ashalley Botwe, Accra.

== Notable alumni ==
- Joseph Kwame Kumah
