= Masawud Mohammed =

Ghanaian politician

Member of the Ghana Parliament for Pru West
- In office 7 January 2017 – 6 January 2021
- Succeeded by: Stephen Jalulah

Personal details
- Born: 1 April 1971 (age 55) Prang, Ghana
- Party: National Democratic Congress
- Education: University of Cape Coast
- Occupation: Politician
- Profession: Teacher

Masawud Mohammed (born 1 April 1971) is a Ghanaian politician and was the member of the Seventh Parliament of the Fourth Republic of Ghana representing the Pru West Constituency in the Brong-Ahafo Region on the ticket of the National Democratic Congress.

== Early years and education ==
Mohammed was born on 1 April 1971 at Prang in the Brong-Ahafo Region. He attended the University of Cape Coast and graduated with a bachelor's degree and master's degree, both in Education.

== Career ==
Mohammed was the member of parliament for Pru West Constituency. Prior to this he worked as a teacher at Atebubu College of Education and served as the District Chief Executive of the Pru District.

== Politics ==
He first became a member of the parliament in 2013, representing the Pru West Constituency. In 2016, he contested for the seat again in the 2016 general elections and won. He garnered 10,740 votes which represents 49.66% of the total votes cast and therefore defeated the other contestants including Stephen Pambiin Jalulah, Eric Kwabena Asamoah and Akurugu Zakarai Atiah.

== Personal life ==
Mohammed is a Muslim. He is married with four children.
