= Akwasi Owusu Afrifa-Mensa =

Ghanaian politician

Hon. Akwasi Owusu Afrifa-Mensa
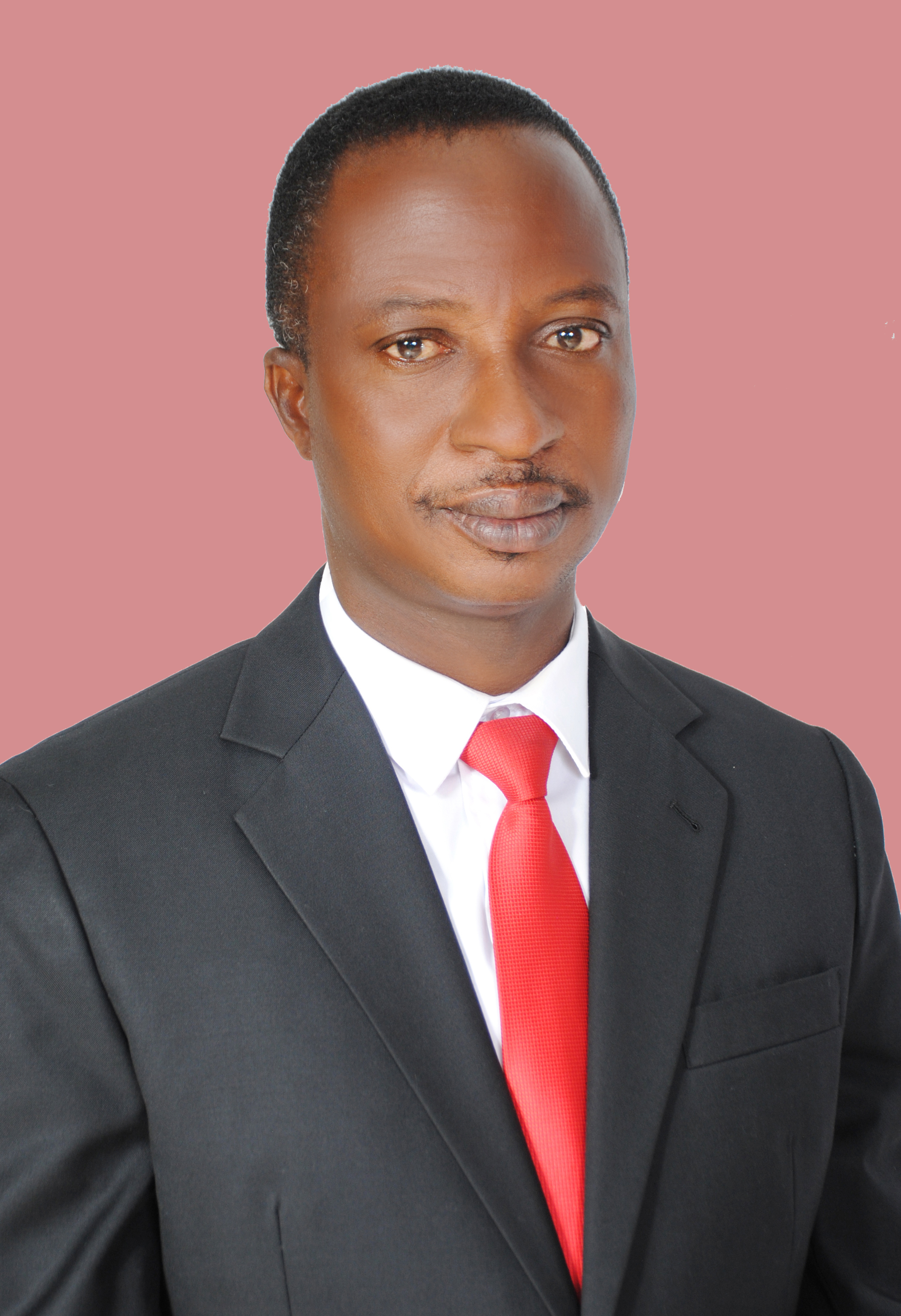

Member of Parliament for Amasaman Constituency
- Incumbent
- Assumed office 7 January 2021
- Preceded by: Emmanuel Nii Okai Laryea

Personal details
- Born: Akwasi Owusu Afrifa-Mensa; 4 March 1971 (age 55) Ghana
- Party: New Patriotic Party
- Occupation: Politician
- Committees: Privileges Committee, Employment, Social Welfare and State Enterprises Committee

Akwasi Owusu Afrifa-Mensa (born 4 March 1971) is a Ghanaian politician who is a member of the New Patriotic Party. He is the member of parliament for the Amasaman Constituency in the Greater Accra Region of Ghana

== Early life and education ==
Akwasi Owusu was born in Asaam in the Ashanti Region. He holds a Master of Business Administration (in Finance).

== Personal life ==
Owusu is a Christian.
