= Stephen Jalulah =

Ghanaian politician

Hon. Stephen Pambiin Jalulah
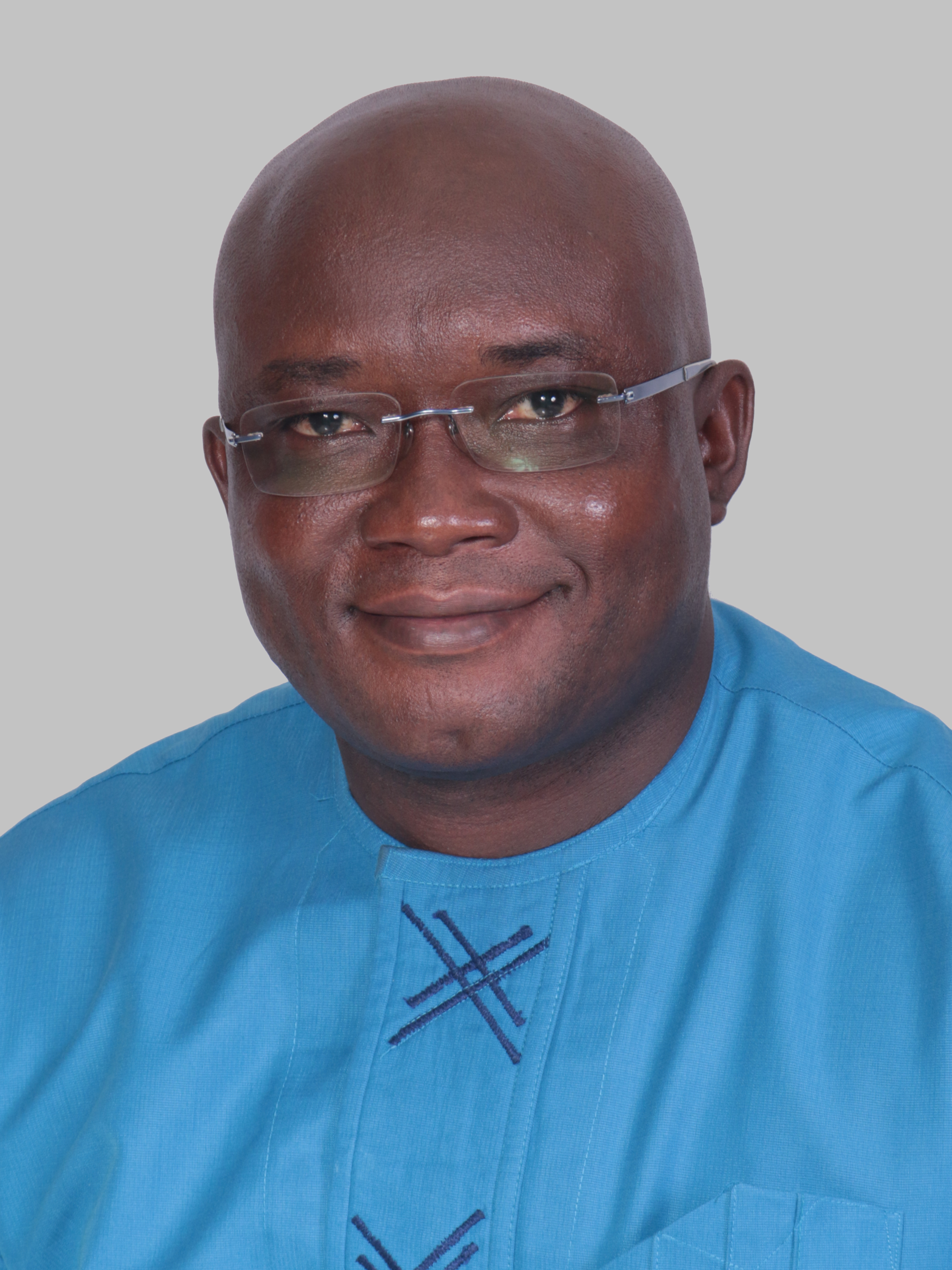

Member of Parliament for Pru West Constituency; Deputy Minister for Roads and Highways
- Incumbent
- Assumed office 7 January 2021
- Preceded by: Masawud Mohammed

Personal details
- Born: Stephen Pambiin Jalulah; 22 October 1974 (age 51) Saboba, Ghana
- Party: New Patriotic Party
- Occupation: Politician
- Committees: Members Holding Offices of Profit Committee, Works and Housing Committee

Stephen Pambiin Jalulah is a Ghanaian politician and was a member of parliament for the Pru West constituency in the Bono East region of Ghana. He was also the Deputy Minister for Roads and Highways after he was sworn in with thirty-nine others by His Excellency the former president Nana Akufo-Addo at the Jubilee House on 25 June 2021.

== Early life and education ==
Jalulah was born on 22 October 1974 and hails from Saboba in the Northern region of Ghana. He had his GCE Ordinary Level in General Science in 1992 and had his GCE Ordinary Level in Business in 1994. He also had his GCE Advance Level in Business in 1996. He further had his Degree in Finance and Banking in 2003 and also had his bachelor's degree in law in 2014. He also had his master's degree in marketing with E-Commerce in 2011.

== Career ==
Jalulah was the District Chief Executive at the Ministry of Local Government for the Pru West district and also the Pru District. He was also the District Manager for the National Health Insurance Authority.

=== Political career ===
Jalulah is a member of NPP and was the MP for Pru West Constituency. He won the parliamentary seat with 16,606 votes making 56.7% of the total votes whilst the incumbent Masawud Mohammed had 12,671 votes making 43.3% of the total votes. He was the Deputy Minister for Roads and Highways under the second tenure of Akuffo Addo's government. His parliamentary journey came to an end when he contested the 2024 elections with one Emmanuel Kofi Ntekuni who was the candidate for the National Democratic Congress. He won with 15,711 votes, representing 53.10% while Stephen Jalulah had 13,876 representing 46.90% .

=== Committees ===
Jalulah was a member of the Members Holding Offices of Profit Committee and also a member of the Works and Housing Committee.

== Personal life ==
Jalulah is a Christian.
