= Ayawaso North (Ghana parliament constituency) =

Parliamentary constituency in Greater Accra, Ghana

- constituency for the Parliament of Ghana
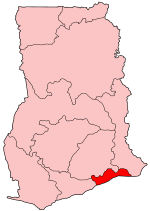
- District: Accra Metropolitan Area
- Region: Greater Accra Region of Ghana

Current constituency
- Party: National Democratic Congress
- MP: Yussif Issaka Jajah

Ayawaso North is one of the constituencies represented in the Parliament of Ghana. It elects one member of parliament (MP) by the first-past-the-post system of election. The Ayawaso North constituency is located in the Greater Accra Region of Ghana.

== Boundaries ==
The constituency is located within the Accra Metropolis District of the Greater Accra Region of Ghana.

== Members of Parliament ==
Election	Member	Party
2016	YUSSIF I. JAJAH	NDC

2016 Ghanaian general election : Ayawaso North Source:Peacefmonline
Party	Candidates	Votes	%
NDC	YUSSIF I. JAJAH	22,144	59.97
NPP	AMINU MOHAMMED ZAKARI	14,644	39.66
CPP	RICHARD HUDSON KOFI AHAMADZI	139	0.38

== See also ==
- List of Ghana Parliament constituencies
- List of political parties in Ghana
