= Abdul-Razak Tahidu =

Ghanaian politician

Hon. Abdul-Razak Tahidu
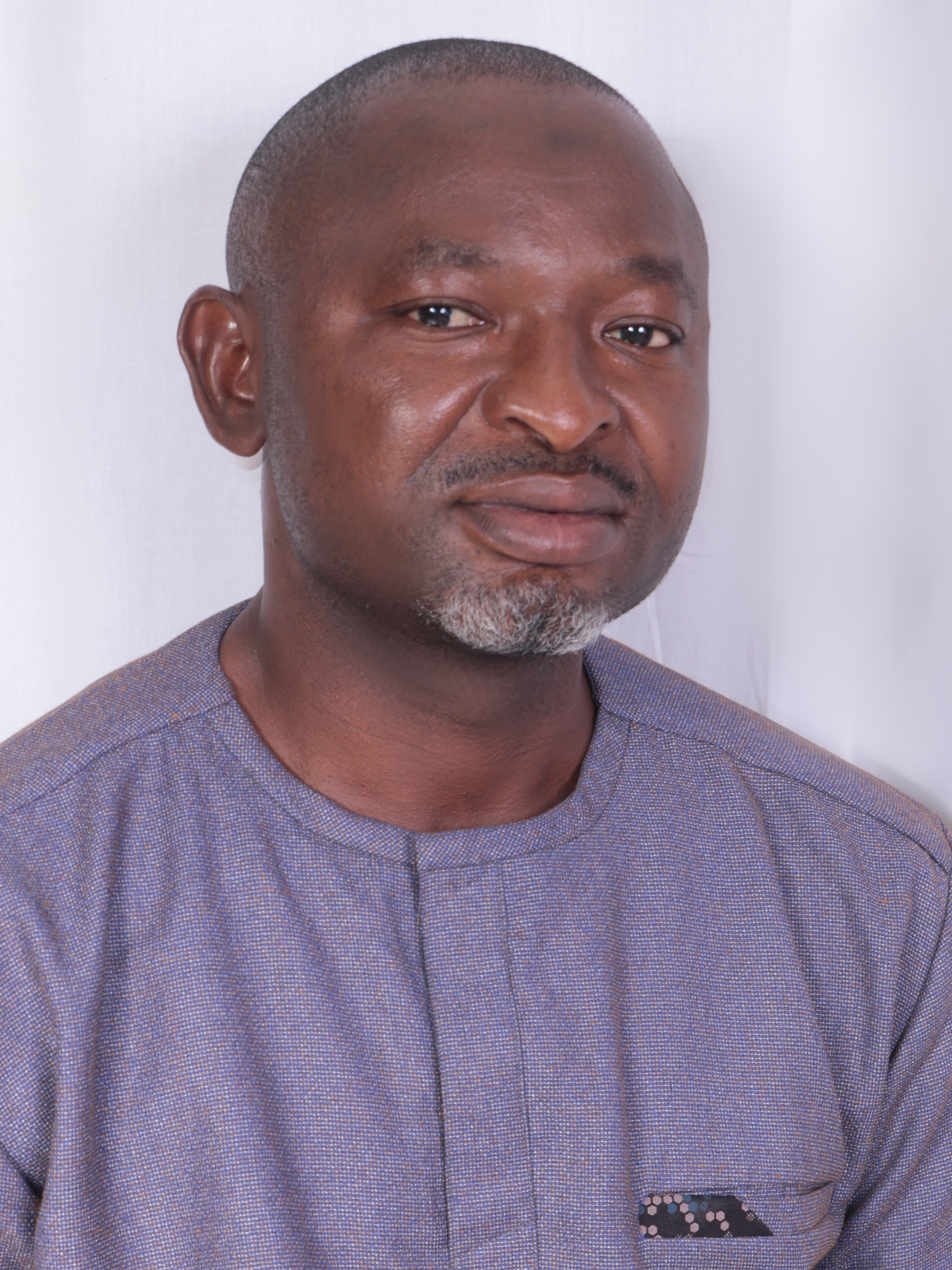

Board Member for Petroleum Commission, Member of Parliament for Chereponi Constituency
- Incumbent
- Assumed office 7 January 2021
- Preceded by: Samuel Abdulai Jabanyite

Personal details
- Born: Abdul-Razak Tahidu; 28 January 1977 (age 49) Chereponi, Ghana
- Party: New Patriotic Party
- Occupation: Politician
- Committees: Subsidiary Legislation Committee, Trade, Industry and Tourism Committee

Abdul-Razak Tahidu is a Ghanaian politician and member of parliament for the Chereponi constituency in the North East region of Ghana.

== Early life and education ==
He was born on 28 January 1977 and hails from Chereponi in the North East region of Ghana. He had his basic education in 1992 and had his SSSCE in 1995. He also had his Teacher certificate in 2000 and his Degree in Basic Education in 2007 and further had his master's degree in Leadership & Development in 2013.

== Career ==
He was the Budget and Examinations Officer at Ghana Education Service and later the District Chief Executive at the Ministry of Local Government for the Chereponi district.

=== Political career ===
He is a member of NPP and currently the MP for Chereponi Constituency. He won the parliamentary seat with 19,800 votes whilst the incumbent Samuel Abdulai Jabanyite had 12,859 votes. Currently, he is a board member for the Petroleum Commission.

=== Committees ===
He is a member of the Subsidiary Legislation Committee and also a member of the Trade, Industry and Tourism Committee.

== Personal life ==
Abdul-Razak is a Muslim.
