= Robert Kwasi Amoah =

Ghanaian politician

Member of the Ghana Parliament for Achiase Constituency

Personal details
- Born: November 17, 1948 (age 77)
- Party: New Patriotic Party

Robert Kwasi Amoah (born October 17, 1948) is a Ghanaian politician and member of the Seventh Parliament of the Fourth Republic of Ghana representing the Achiase Constituency in the Eastern Region on the ticket of the New Patriotic Party.

== Personal life ==
Amoah is a Christian. He is married with eight children.

== Early life and education ==
Amoah was born on October 17, 1948. He hails from Achiase, a town in the Eastern Region of Ghana. He attended Osei Tutu Training College where he had his Certificate A. He also had his Diploma in Agricultural education from St. Andrews College He attended the University of Education, Winneba and obtained his Bachelor of Education and Master of Philosophy degree in Guidance and Counselling.

== Politics ==
Amoah is a member of the New Patriotic Party (NPP). During the 2020 New Patriotic Party primaries, he lost to Kofi Ahenkorah Marfo.

=== 2012 election ===
In the 2012 Ghanaian general election, he won the Achiase Constituency parliamentary seat with 14,395 votes making 62.67% of the total votes cast whilst the NDC parliamentary candidate Dr. Kwasi Akyem Apea-kubi had 8,503 votes making 37.02% of the total votes cast and the NDP parliamentary candidate Charles Kwabena Kurankye had 73 votes making 0.32% of the total votes cast.

=== 2016 election ===
In the 2016 Ghanaian general election, he again won the Achiase Constituency parliamentary seat with 14,659 votes making 68.74% of the total votes cast whilst the NDC parliamentary candidate Yaw Sam-Korankye had 6,339 votes making 29.72% of the total votes cast and the CPP parliamentary candidate Botwe Ernest had 328 votes making 1.54% of the total votes.

=== Committee ===
In 2020, Amoah was the Acting Chairman of the Select Committee.

== Employment ==
Amoah was the Headteacher of LA JSS in Achiase

== Philanthropy ==
In May 2018, he constructed on oil palm factory in his constituency.

In February 2020, Amoah built a building to serve as the headquarters of the Achiase District Police. He also awarded scholarships to 10 students to continue their tertiary education. He also nursed and shared about 60,000 oil palm seedlings to farmers in his district.
