= Sawla-Tuna-Kalba (Ghana parliament constituency) =

Parliamentary constituency in Ghana

- constituency for the Parliament of Ghana
- District: Sawla-Tuna-Kalba District
- Region: Savannah Region of Ghana

Current constituency
- Party: National Democratic Congress
- MP: Andrew Dari Chiwitey

Sawla-Tuna-Kalba is one of the constituencies represented in the Parliament of Ghana. It elects one member of parliament (MP) by the first-past-the-post system of election. It is located in the Savannah Region of Ghana. The current member of Parliament for the constituency is Andrew Dari Chiwitey. He was elected on the ticket of the National Democratic Congress (NDC) and won a majority of 10,612 votes more than candidate closest in the race, to win the constituency election to become the MP.

== See also ==
- List of Ghana Parliament constituencies
