= Bright Wireko-Brobby =

Ghanaian politician (born 1972)

Hon Bright Wireko-Brobby
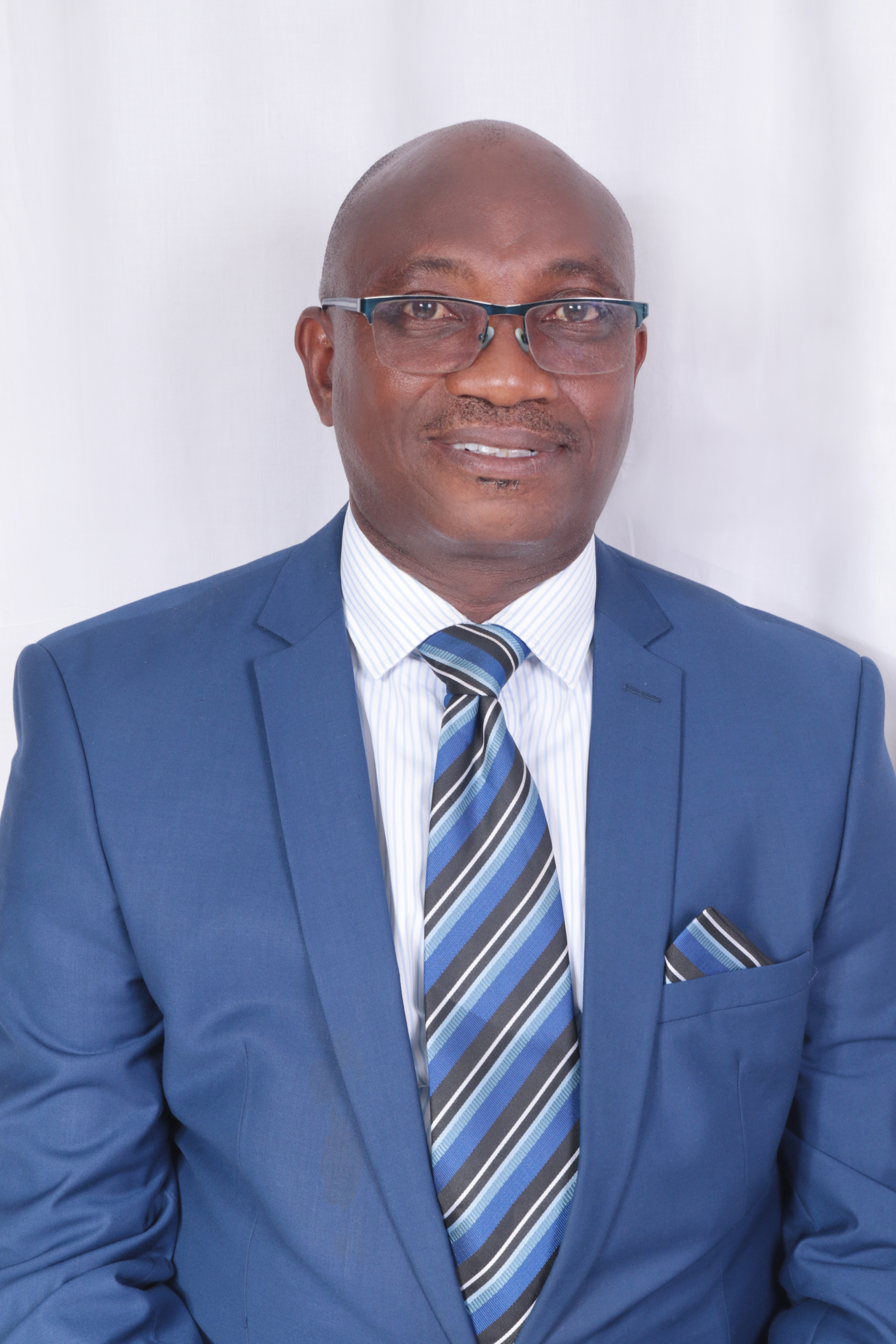

Member of the Ghana Parliament for Hemang Lower Denkyira
- Incumbent
- Assumed office 7 January 2017

Personal details
- Born: Bright Wireko-Brobby; 6 January 1972 (age 54) Twifo Hemang, Ghana
- Party: New Patriotic Party
- Education: Kwame Nkrumah University of Science and Technology, University of Dortmund
- Occupation: Politician
- Profession: Lawyer
- Committees: Trade, Industry and Tourism Committee, Local Government and Rural Development Committee

Bright Wireko-Brobby (born 6 January 1972) is a Ghanaian politician and member of the Eight Parliament of the Fourth Republic of Ghana representing the Hemang Lower Denkyira Constituency in the Central Region on the ticket of the New Patriotic Party. He is also the Deputy Minister for Employment and Labour Relations.

== Early life and education ==
Wireko-Brobby was born on 6 January 1972 and hails from Twifo Hemang in the Central Region of Ghana. He holds an M.S.C in Planning and L.L.B from the Faculty of Law from the Kwame Nkrumah University of Science and Technology. He continued to the University of Dortmund where he obtained a Postgraduate Diploma in Spatial Planning.

== Career ==
Wireko-Brobby has worked with organizations such as USAID, UNHCR and UNDP. He also worked with the Ghana Education Service. He was also the Executive Director for Community Empowerment Associates.

== Politics ==
Wireko-Brobby is a member of the New Patriotic Party. He is currently the Member of Parliament for Hemang Lower Denkyira Constituency in the Central Region.

=== 2016 election ===
In the 2016 Ghanaian general election, he won the Hemang Lower Denkyira Constituency parliamentary seat with 15,043 votes making 58.4% of the total votes cast whilst the NDC parliamentary candidate Foster Joseph Andoh had 10,338 votes making 40.1% of the total votes cast, the PPP parliamentary candidate Paul Kinsley Ambantem had 257 votes making 1.0% of the total votes cast and the CPP parliamentary candidate John Felix Krampah had 119 votes making 0.5% of the total votes cast.

=== 2020 election ===
In the 2020 Ghanaian general election, he again won the Hemang Lower Denkyira Constituency parliamentary seat with 14,791 votes making 52.9% of the total votes cast whilst the NDC parliamentary candidate Foster Joseph Andoh had 12,692 votes making 45.4% of the total votes cast and the GUM parliamentary candidate Appiah Kubi had 473 votes making 1.7% of the total votes cast.

=== Committees ===
Wireko-Brobby is a member of the Trade, Industry and Tourism Committee and also a member of the Local Government and Rural Development Committee.

== Personal life ==
Wireko-Brobby is a Christian
