= Kintampo North (Ghana parliament constituency) =

Constituency in the Bono East Region of Ghana

- constituency for the Parliament of Ghana
- Region: Bono East Region of Ghana

Current constituency
- Party: National Democratic Congress
- MP: Joseph Kwame Kumah

Kintampo North is one of the constituencies represented in the Parliament of Ghana. It elects one Member of Parliament (MP) by the first past the post system of election.

Joseph Kwame Kumah is the member of parliament for the constituency. He was elected on the ticket of the National Democratic Congress (NDC) .

== See also ==
- List of Ghana Parliament constituencies
