= Andrew Dari Chiwitey =

Ghanaian politician (born 1970)

Hon Andrew Dari Chiwitey
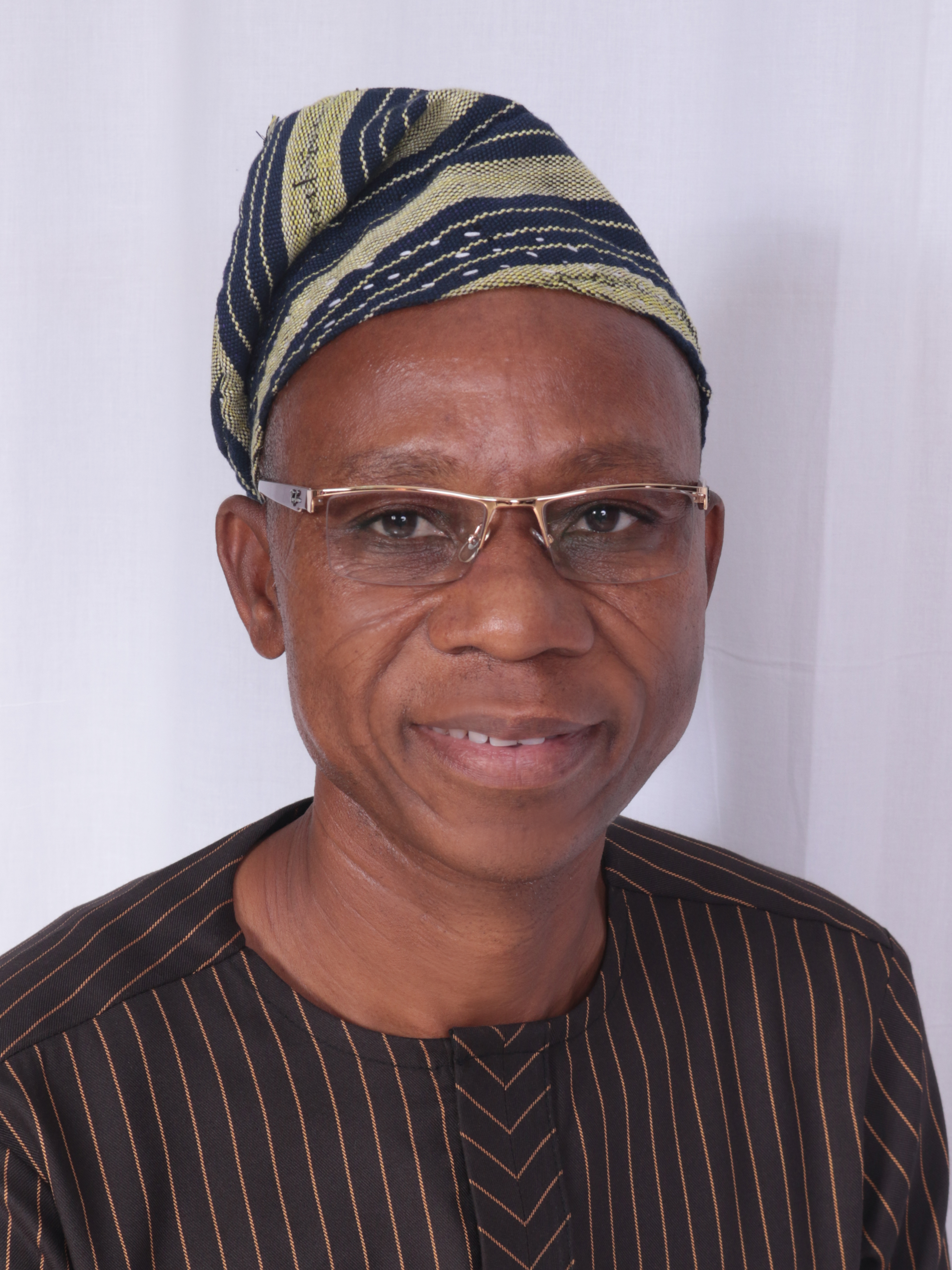

Member of the Ghana Parliament for Sawla-Tuna Kalba
- Incumbent
- Assumed office 7 January 2021

Personal details
- Born: Andrew Dari Chiwitey; 27 September 1970 (age 55) Nakoiyiri
- Party: National Democratic Congress
- Occupation: Politician
- Committees: Public Accounts Committee, Environment, Science and Technology Committee

Andrew Dari Chiwitey (born 27 September 1970) is a Ghanaian politician and member of the Seventh Parliament of the Fourth Republic of Ghana representing the Sawla-Tuna Kalba Constituency in the Northern Region on the ticket of the National Democratic Congress .

== Early life and education ==
Chiwitey hails from Nakoiyiri in the Northern Region of Ghana. He holds an HND in Sec/Management Studies from Tamale Polytechnic, Masters in Human Resource Development and a B.A, Master of Arts from the University of Cape Coast.

== Politics ==
Chiwitey is a member of the National Democratic Congress(Ghana).

=== 2016 election ===
He contested the 2016 Ghanaian general election on the ticket of the National Democratic Congress and won the Sawla-Tuba Kalba constituency Parliament seat. He won the election with 17,209 of the total votes, representing 66.68%. He won the parliamentary seat over the New Patriotic Party parliamentary candidate Jame Kpibo Suuyehzi who polled 8,301 votes representing 32.16%, Ibrahim Yakubu also contested the parliamentary seat on the ticket of the PPP and polled 202 votes representing 0.78%, and the parliamentary candidate for the Convention People's party Albert Iddisah had 98 votes which is equivalent to 0.38% of the total vote cast.

==== 2020 election ====
Chiwitey was re-elected as a member of parliament for Sawla-Tuba Kalba constituency during the 2020 Ghanaian general election on the ticket of the National Democratic Congress with 21,382 votes, equivalent to 65.9%. He won the election over the parliamentary candidate for the New Patriotic Party Banasco Seidu Nuhu who polled 10,780 votes representing 33.2% of the total vote, and Yakubu Ibrahim who was the parliamentary candidate for the NDP had 308 votes representing 1.0% of the total votes.

=== Committees ===
Chiwitey is a member of the Government assurance committee and the deputy ranking member on Parliament works and housing committee.

He is a vice chairperson for Road and Transportations committee

He is Independent Constitutional Bodies - Member

== Personal life ==
He is a Christian.
