= Amasaman (Ghana parliament constituency) =

Constituency in Ghana

- constituency for the Parliament of Ghana
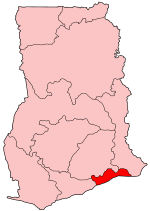
- District: Ga West District
- Region: Greater Accra Region of Ghana

Current constituency
- Created: 2012
- Party: National Democratic Congress
- MP: Sedem Kweku Afenyo

Amasaman is one of the constituencies represented in the Parliament of Ghana. It elects one Member of Parliament (MP) by the first past the post system of election. Sedem Kweku Afenyo is the member of parliament for the constituency. Amasaman is located in the Ga West District of the Greater Accra Region of Ghana.

== Boundaries ==
Amasaman is located in the Ga West District of the Greater Accra Region of Ghana.

== Members of Parliament ==
Election	Member	Party
2012	Emmanuel Nii Okai Laryea	National Democratic Congress
2016	Emmanuel Nii Okai Laryea	National Democratic Congress

== Hospitals ==
- Ga West Municipal Hospital.

== See also ==
- List of Ghana Parliament constituencies
