= Kofi Ahenkorah Marfo =

Ghanaian politician

Hon. Kofi Ahenkorah Marfo
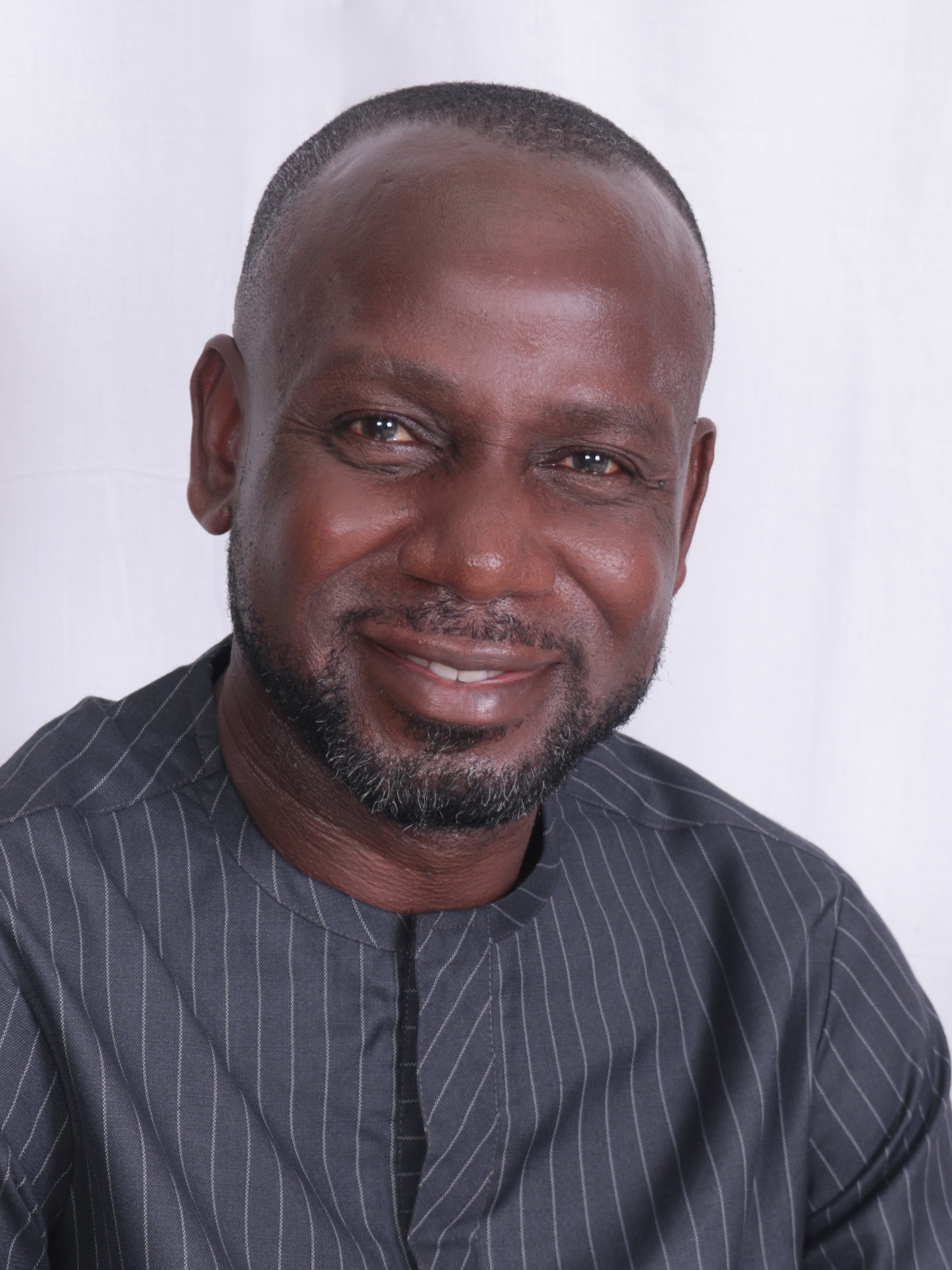

Member of Parliament for Achiase Constituency
- Incumbent
- Assumed office 7 January 2021

Personal details
- Born: Kofi Ahenkorah Marfo; 26 April 1968 (age 58) Akim Bieni, Ghana
- Party: New Patriotic Party
- Occupation: Politician
- Profession: Managing Director
- Committees: Privileges Committee; Roads and Transport Committee

Kofi Ahenkorah Marfo is a Ghanaian politician and member of the Eighth Parliament of the Fourth Republic of Ghana representing the Achiase Constituency in the Eastern Region on the ticket of the New Patriotic Party. He is currently the Board Chairman for the Metro Mass Transit Limited.

== Early life and education ==
Marfo was born on 26 April 1968 and hails from Akim Bieni in the Eastern region. He completed his Junior Secondary School Certificate in 1981 and his GCE O level in 1986. He later had his Proficiency Certificate in custom house agency in 2000 and his Executive certificate in 2013. He further had his Executive Masters in 2014.

== Career ==
Marfo was the Managing Director of KAM-G Services Limited and KAMPHA Logistics Limited.

=== Political career ===
Marfo is a member of NPP and currently the MP for the Achiase Constituency in the Eastern region. In the 2020 Ghana general elections, he won the parliamentary seat with 14,796 votes making 61.16% of the total votes cast whilst the NDC parliamentary aspirant Kwasi Akyem Apea-Kubi had 9,154 votes making 37.84% of the total votes cast and the GUM parliamentary candidate Christiana Yeboah had 243 votes making 1% of the total votes cast.

==== Committees ====
Marfo is a member of the Privileges committee and also a member of Roads and Transport Committee.

== Personal life ==
Marfo is a Christian.

== Philanthropy ==
Marfo presented 16 hair dryers, 2 new buses, 70 new sewing machines and an amount of 10,000 Ghana cedis as a form of scholarship to 20 students at the tertiary level in Achiase.
