= Emmanuel Nii Okai Laryea =

Ghanaian politician

Member of the Ghana Parliament for Amasaman Constituency

Personal details
- Born: 16 August 1983 (age 42)
- Party: National Democratic Congress

Emmanuel Nii Okai Laryea is a Ghanaian politician and member of the Seventh Parliament of the Fourth Republic of Ghana representing the Amasaman Constituency in the Greater Accra Region on the ticket of the National Democratic Congress.

== Personal life and education ==
Laryea was born on 16 August 1983 in a town called Gbese-Accra in his region. He is the grandson of Harry Dodoo.

He had his Bachelor of Arts degree in Political Science and Information Studies from the University of Ghana, Legon. Prior to his appointment into parliament, he was the chief executive officer at Commanex Investment Limited.

== Political career ==
He was first elected to parliament on 7 January 2013 after the completion of the 2012 Ghanaian General Elections. During that tenure, he was the youngest Legislator in Ghana.

He was then reelected on 7 January 2016 after the completion of the 2016 Ghanaian General Elections where he obtained 49.83% of the valid votes cast.

Mr Laryea is currently contesting in the Odododiodioo NDC primaries as Nii Lantey Vanderpuye announced his step down from contesting in the 2024 elections.

== Parliamentary Committee ==
- Employment, State Enterprises & Social Welfare Committee Member - 2013–2017
- Vice Chair of Gender and Social Protection (2013- 2017)
- Committee on Environment (2017–2021)
- House Committee Member (2017–2021)

== Personal life ==
He is married to a lawyer in Bronx, NY. He has 3 kids from two prior marriages.
