= Kwadwo Nyanpon Aboagye =

Ghanaian politician

Hon Kwadwo Nyanpon Aboagye
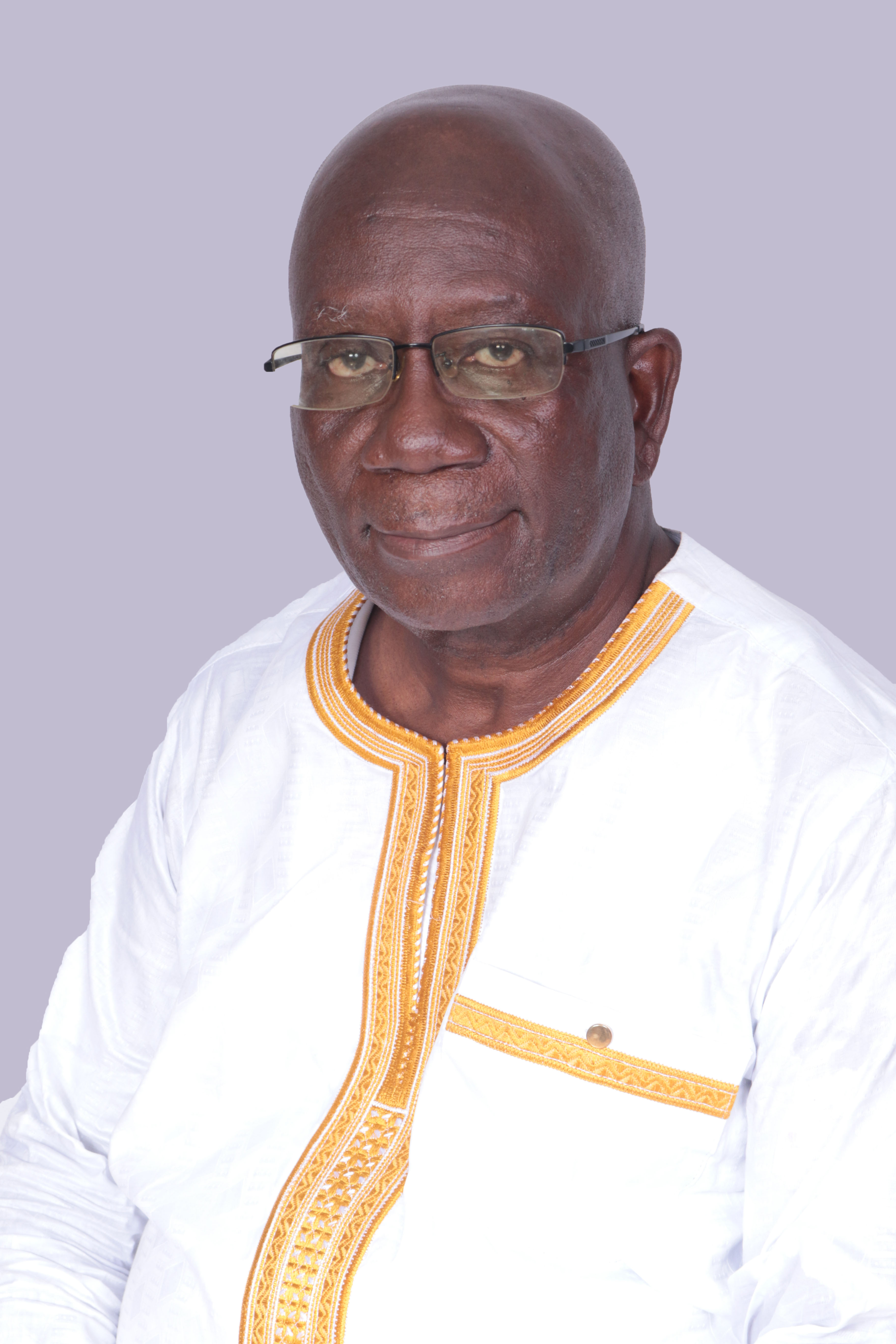

Member of the Ghana Parliament for Biakoye Constituency
- Incumbent
- Assumed office 7 January 2021

Personal details
- Born: Anthony Mwinkaara Sumah; 13 November 1950 (age 75) Apesokubi
- Party: National Democratic Congress
- Occupation: Politician
- Committees: Special Budget Committee, Roads and Transport Committee

Kwadwo Nyanpon Aboagye (born 13 November 1950) is a Ghanaian politician and a former member of the Seventh and Eighth Parliament of the Fourth Republic of Ghana. He represented the Biakoye Constituency in the Oti Region on the ticket of the National Democratic Congress. In April 2022, he organized a free eye screening and surgery for the residents of Biakoye.

== Early life and education ==
Aboagye hails from Apesokubi. He holds a B.S.C in Civil Engineering from the Kwame Nkrumah University of Science and Technology, a certificate in corporate governance from GIMPA. He is also a member of the Ghana Institute of Engineers and the Civil Institution of Engineers, U.K.
