= Sampson Tangombu Chiragia =

Ghanaian politician, Navongron MP IN upper East Region of Ghana

Hon Sampson Tangombu Chiragia
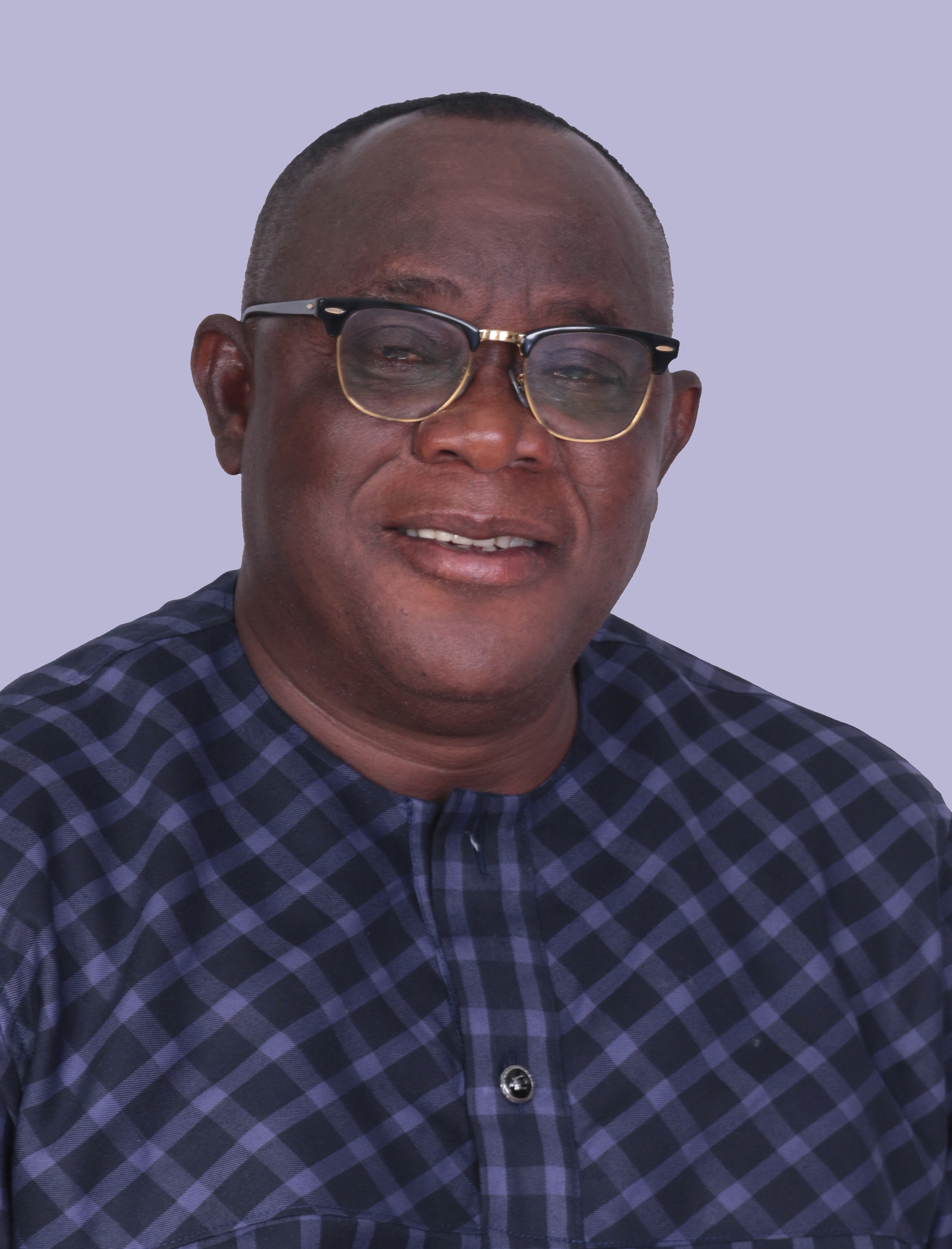

Member of the Ghana Parliament for Navrongo Central Constituency
- Incumbent
- Assumed office 7 January 2021

Personal details
- Born: Sampson Tangombu Chiragia; 24 October 1966 (age 59) Navrongo
- Party: National Democratic Congress
- Occupation: Politician
- Committees: Members Holding Offices of Profit Committee, Environment, Science and Technology CommitPublic Accounts Committee, Environment, Science and Technology Committee

Sampson Tangombu Chiragia (born 24 October 1966) is a Ghanaian politician and member of the National Democratic Congress. He is the member of parliament for the Navrongo Central Constituency in the Upper West Region of Ghana.

== Early life and education ==
Chiragia hails from Navrongo. He holds an MBA in Financial management.

== Personal life ==
Sampson Tangombu Chiragia is a christian.
