= Yussif Issaka Jajah =

Ghanaian politician (born 1979)

Hon Yussif Issaka Jajah
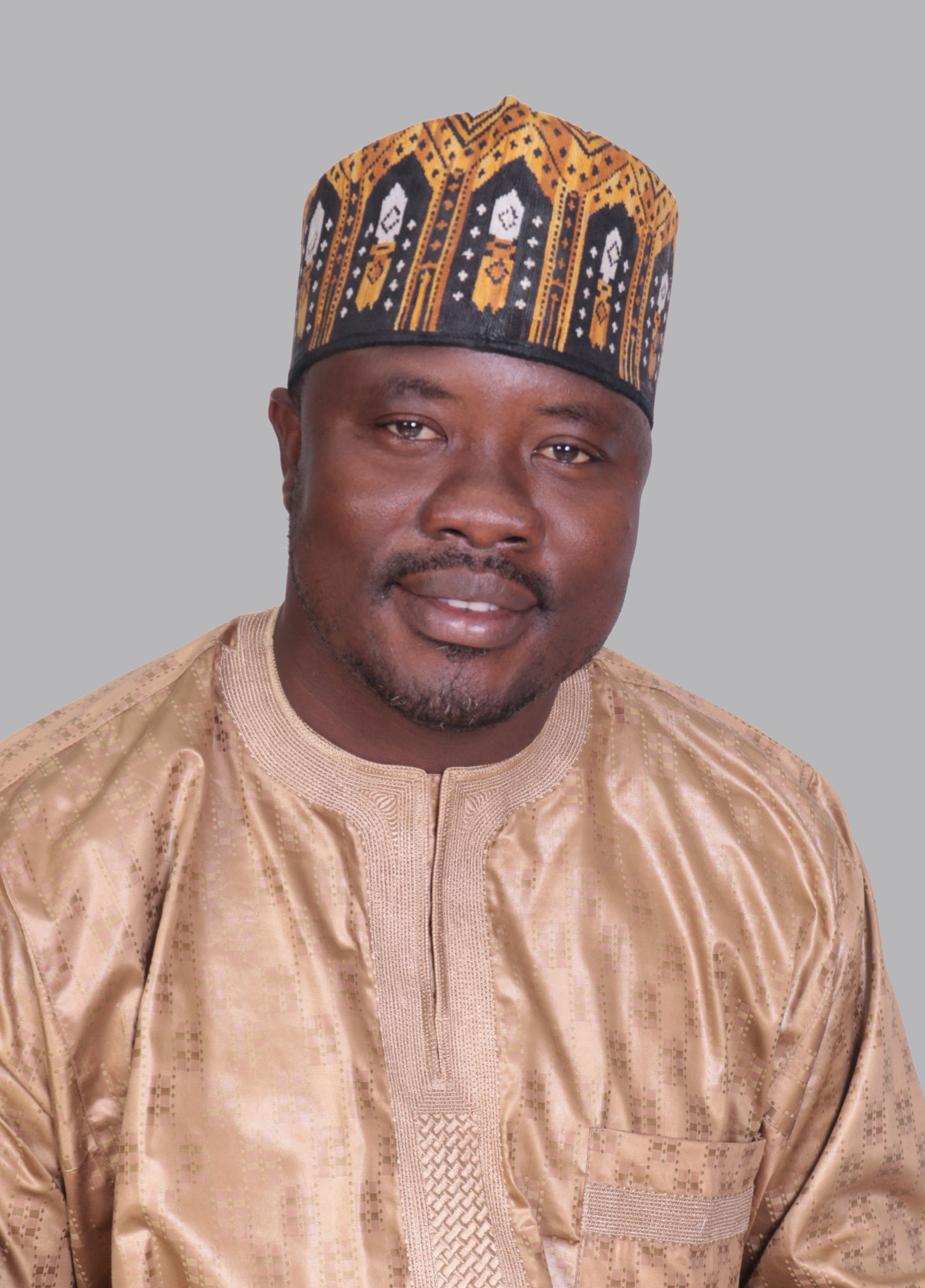

Member of the Ghana Parliament for Ayawaso North
- Incumbent
- Assumed office 7 January 2021

Personal details
- Born: Yussif Issaka Jajah; 21 October 1979 (age 46) Bole, Ghana
- Party: National Democratic Congress
- Education: University of Dundee; University of Professional Studies, Accra
- Occupation: Politician
- Committees: Finance Committee, Roads and Transport Committee

Yussif Issaka Jajah (born 21 October 1979) is a Ghanaian politician and member of the Ninth Parliament of the Fourth Republic of Ghana representing the Ayawaso North Constituency in the Greater Accra Region on the ticket of the National Democratic Congress.

== Career ==
He was a Research Fellow at the Inter-Ministerial Coordinating Committee on Decentralization in Accra from 2013 to 2016. He was also a Consultant of Oil and Gas from 2011 to 2012 and MDPI and Goodwill International.

== Early life and education ==
He was born on 21 October 1979 and hails from Bole in the Savannah region of Ghana. He earned his MBA in International Oil and Gas Management from the University of Dundee in Scotland, UK, in 2011, and a BSc in Accounting from the University of Professional Studies, Accra (UPSA), in 2009. He also graduated from the Institute of Chartered Accountants in Ghana. He also attended his JSS at Bethel '3' JSS and continued to secondary school at Accra High Senior Secondary. he also attained his MPHil in Development Finance and MSc Energy Economics from GIMPA.

== Politics ==
He is a member of the National Democratic Congress. He is the member of parliament for Ayawaso-North constituency in Greater Accra region. Jajah represented Ayawaso-North constituency in the Seventh and Eighth Parliament of the Fourth Republic of Ghana.

=== 2016 election ===
Jajah contested the Ayawaso-North constituency parliamentary seat on the ticket of the National Democratic Congress during the 2016 Ghanaian general election and won with 22,144 votes, representing 59.97% of the total votes polled. He was elected over Amidu Mohammed Zakari of the New Patriotic Party who polled 14,644 votes, equivalent to 39.66%, and the parliamentary candidate for the Convention People's Party Richard Hudson Kofi Ahamadzi had 139 votes, representing 0.38% of the total votes.

==== 2020 election ====
Jajah was re-elected as a member of parliament for the Ayawaso-North constituency on the ticket of the National Democratic Congress during the 2020 Ghanaian general election with 28,207 votes representing 62.66% over the parliamentary candidate for the New Patriotic Party Alhaji Mohammed Manaf Osumanu, who had 16, 810 votes, representing 37.34% of the total votes.

== Personal life ==
Jajah is a Muslim. He is married with two children.
