= Thomas Mbomba =

Ghanaian politician

Hon Thomas Mbomba
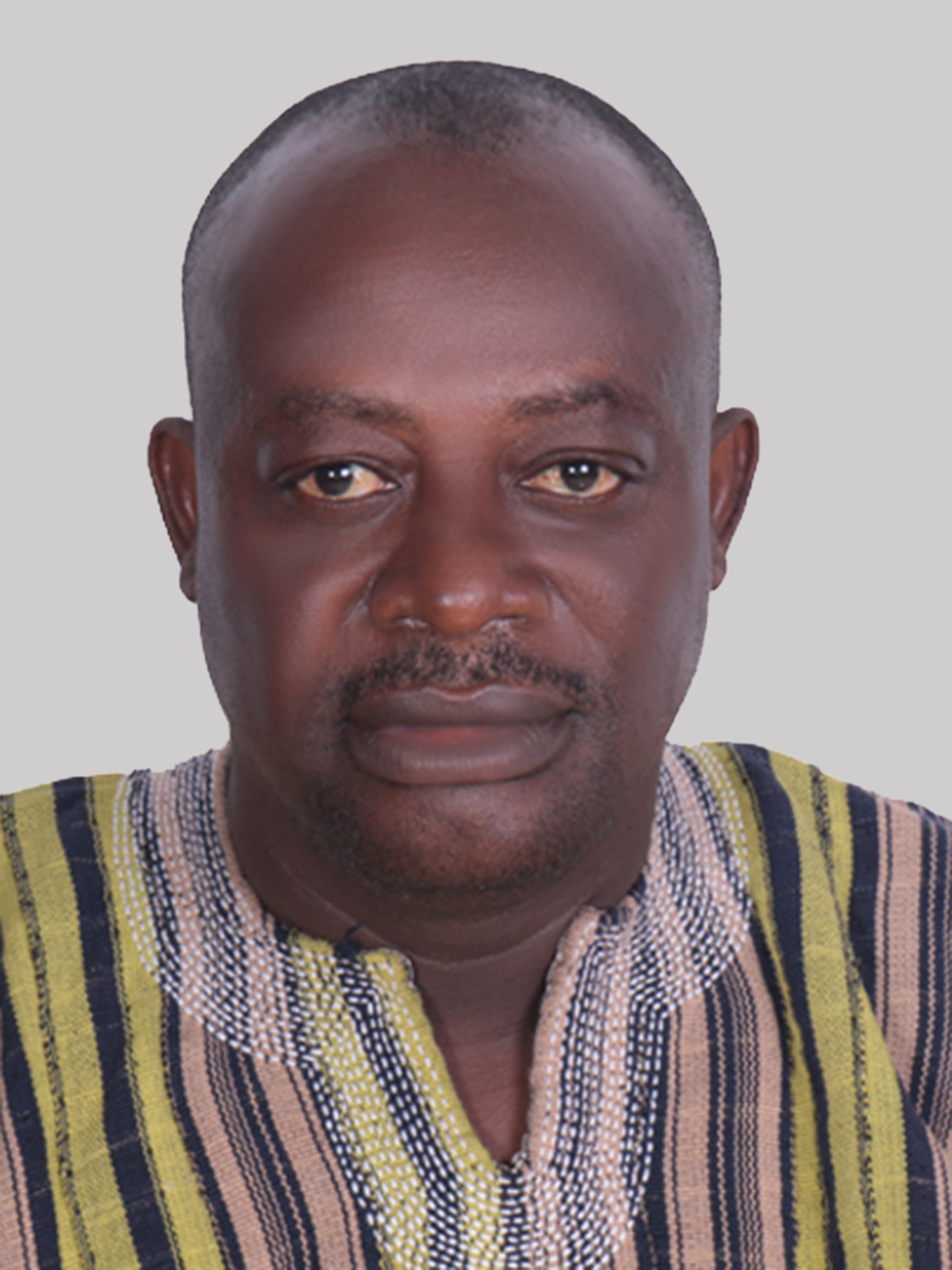

Member of the Ghana Parliament for Tatale/Sanguli constituency
- Incumbent
- Assumed office 7 January 2021

Personal details
- Born: Thomas Mbomba; 29 September 1976 (age 49) Nahuyili
- Party: New Patriotic Party
- Occupation: Politician
- Committees: Youth, Sports and Culture Committee, Members Holding Offices of Profit Committee, House Committee

Thomas Mbomba is a Ghanaian politician and member of the New Patriotic Party. He is the Member of Parliament for the Tatale/Sanguli constituency, a border constituency in the Northern Region of Ghana.

== Early life and education ==
Mbomba was born on 29 September 1976. In 1988, Mbomba obtained his middle school certificate. He earned his Ordinary Level and Advanced Level certificates in 1994 and 1996 respectively. Following his secondary education, Mbomba pursued a Bachelor of Arts Degree in Sociology and Political Science, which he received in 2009 from the University of Ghana. In 2012, he was awarded his Master's Degree in Human Resource Management.

== Career ==
Prior to entering parliament, he worked as the operations manager for Ghana Post. He also worked With the Ministry of Local Government and Rural Development as a District Chief Executive.

== Personal life ==
Mbomba is a Christian and is married with four children. He hails from Nahuyili.
