= Ato Panford =

Ghanaian politician

Member of the Ghana Parliament for Shama Constituency

Personal details
- Born: August 28, 1962 (age 63)
- Died: December 2, 2023 GPHA Hospital, Takoradi
- Party: New Patriotic Party

Ato Panford (born on 28 August 1962) was a Ghanaian politician and member of the Seventh Parliament of the Fourth Republic of Ghana who represented the Shama Constituency in the Western Region on the ticket of the New Patriotic Party.

== Education ==
He graduated from the University of Southampton with a B.Sc. in Engineering and an M.B.A.He graduated from the University of Southampton with a B.Sc. in Engineering and an M.B.A.

== Personal life ==
Ato Panford was a Christian.

== Career ==
At the National (AfCFTA) Coordinating Office, AfCFT Honorable Dr. Ato Panford served as Senior Advisor (Enterprise Support Specialist-Technical Audit). He began working as a lead consultant on October 1, 2021, and reports to the minister in charge of trade and industry through the chief director of that ministry and the national coordinator for the African Continental Trade Agreement (AfCFTA). He also made recommendations to the minister regarding the readiness of the private sector exporters and industries to be registered under AfCFTA protocols for strategic support through technical interventions to the Ghanaian exporters through technical audits of their operations.

He was an industrialist with more than 25 years of experience in the private and public sectors. His areas of expertise include the development of SMEs, technical industrial production and processing, technical engineering and installations, factory plant installations, and auditing systems and processes in the food processing and manufacturing sectors, particularly in the extrusion of expandable polystyrene (EPS, GPPS, HIPS, etc.) and thermoforming. Setting up global Integrated Quality Systems for certifications, coaching, and staffing key personnel and management.

As a private sector business promoter, he began his career as an industrial plant and marine engineer, founded his own firms (manufacturing, agro-processing, and farming), led the Western & Central Branches of the Association of Ghana Industries, and eventually attained the position of Vice-President of AGI (SMEs). Ato served as a member of the AGI Council, which created the Ghana Business Code, a voluntary system that runs parallel to the ILO's guidelines for business best practices in Ghana, and developed a SME sector for the association through policy and advocacy to support and dynamically position them with good corporate governance, strategic planning, business restructuring, business process outsourcing (BPO), business couching, and business process outsourcing (BPO). made significant contributions to the Ghana Industrialization Policy, which facilitated Ghana's industrialization.

The President of the Republic of Ghana highlighted the GEA Bill's passage into an Act of Parliament (Act 1043, 2020) on December 29, 2020, at which point he was appointed Board Chairman of the Ghana Enterprise Agency (GEA), formerly the National Board for Small Scale Industries (NBSSI) of Ghana. He oversaw the transformation process from the national Board with the Ministry of Trade & Industry under the Minister and with parliamentary guidance to the Ministry, the Board, and Management.

In addition to serving as the President's Representative at Takoradi Technical University, Ato Panford consults for the World Bank Group and oversees the implementation of government policies for technical universities in order to foster the growth and development of the institution. In addition, he served as a member of the Institute for Applied Science & Technologies (IAST) Advisory Board at the University of Ghana Legon in Accra, Ghana. IAST is a private sector organization that develops and enhances technologies for increased industry productivity and production.

== NPP Primaries ==
Building up to the 2020 parliamentary elections, the New Patriotic Party (NPP) organized its parliamentary primaries to elect a candidate to represent the party. Ato Panford participated but lost to his contender Lawyer Samuel Erickson Abakah who later won in the general elections.

== Committees ==
In addition to serving as the Western Region's Shama Constituency's representative in the 7th Parliament of the Republic of Ghana, Hon. Dr. Ato Panford was named Vice-Chairman of the Select Committee on Trade, Industry, and Tourism, which has oversight authority over the Ministry of Trade & Industry and the Ministry of Tourism, Arts, and Culture. Under his leadership, the Ghana Standards Authority (GSA) faced challenges from some of the Ministries mentioned above. He addressed these challenges with a statement on the floor of Parliament, which led to the introduction of the new GSA Bill 2021 before the House, as well as draft bills from the Ghana Free Zones Board (GFZB), Ghana Export Promotion Authority (GEPA), and Ghana International Trade Commission (GITC) Legislative Instrument LI, Ghana Ports & Harbours Authority (GPHA) paperless project, Ghana Tourism Authority (GTA) issues on the Kintampo Waterfall Disaster with an LI passed.

== Death ==
Ato Panford, a former member of parliament for Shama in the Western Region and member of the New Patriotic Party (NPP), died at the age of 61.

He was reported to have died on Sunday morning, February 12, 2023, at the Takoradi, Georgia, GPHA Hospital, where he had been sent for treatment following a brief illness.
