= Alfred Obeng-Boateng =

Ghanaian politician

Hon. Alfred Obeng-Boateng
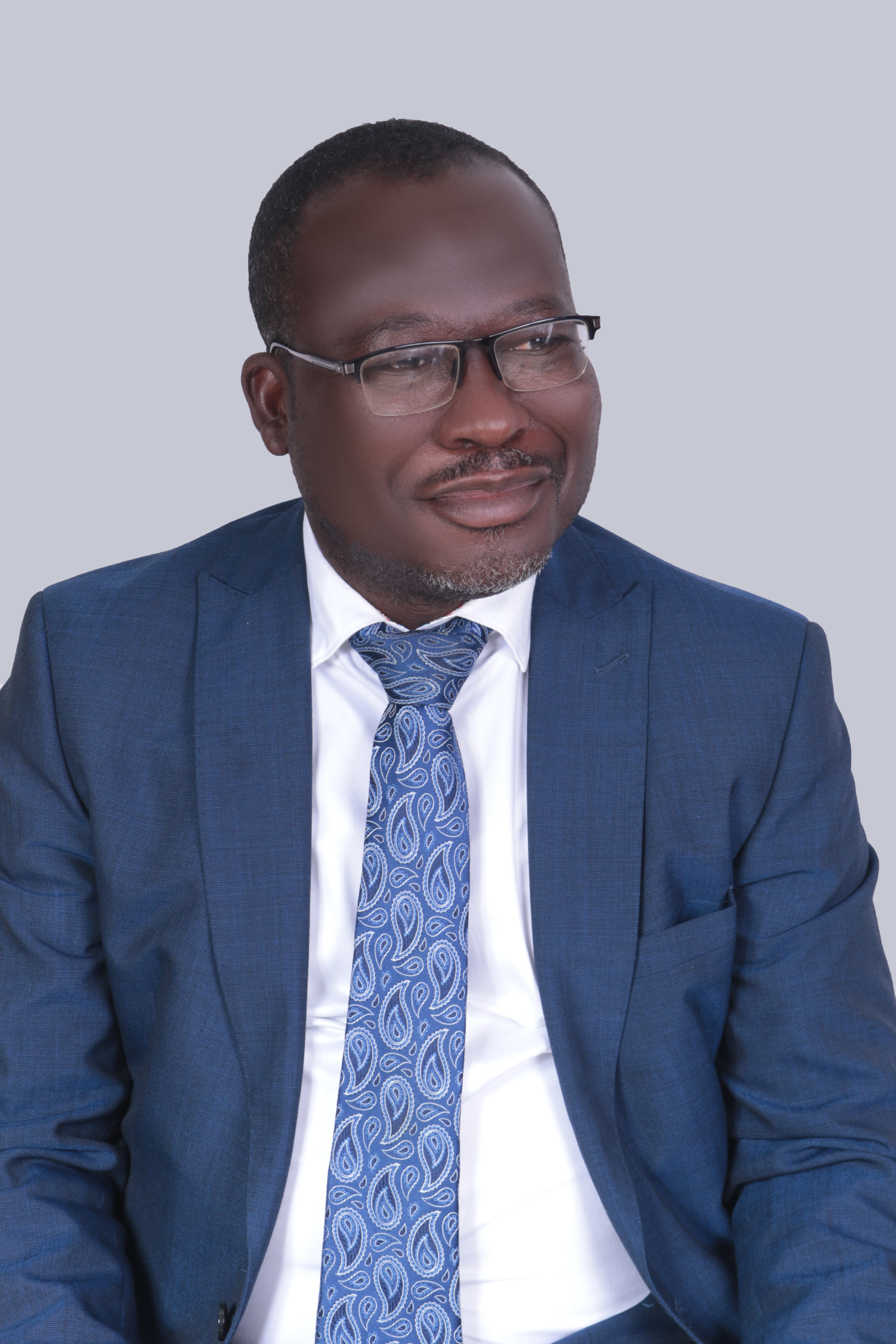

Member of Parliament for Bibiani-Anhwiaso-Bekwai constituency
- Incumbent
- Assumed office 7 January 2021

Personal details
- Born: Alfred Obeng-Boateng; 23 November 1973 (age 52) Subiri Nkwanta, Ghana
- Party: New Patriotic Party
- Occupation: Politician
- Committees: Constitutional, Legal and Parliamentary Affairs Committee, Mines and Energy Committee

Alfred Obeng-Boateng (born 23 November 1973) is a Ghanaian politician who is a member of the New Patriotic Party. He is the member of parliament for the Bibiani-Anhwiaso-Bekwai constituency in the Western North Region of Ghana.

== Early life and education ==
Obeng-Boateng hails from Subiri Nkwanta. A graduate of Kwame Nkrumah University of Science and Technology, he holds masters of law (Oil and Gas).

== Personal life ==
Obeng-Boateng is a christian.
