= Abdulai Abanga =

Ghanaian politician

Hon. Abdulai Abanga
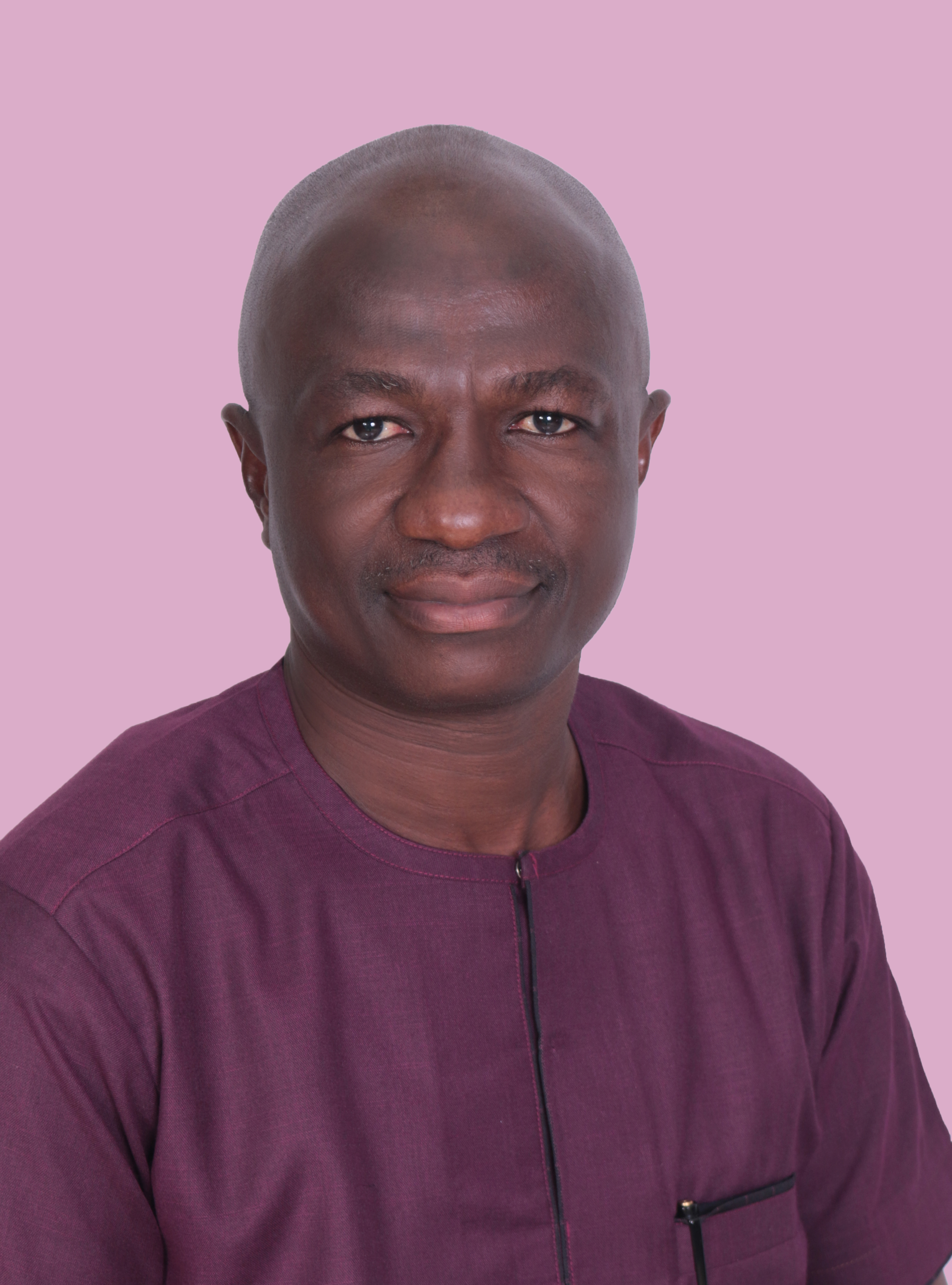

Member of Parliament for Binduri Constituency
- Incumbent
- Assumed office 7 January 2021
- Preceded by: Robert Baba Kuganab-Lem

Personal details
- Born: 25 May 1970 (age 56) Akwatia, Ghana
- Party: New Patriotic Party
- Occupation: Politician
- Committees: Government Assurance Committee

Abdulai Abanga (born 25 May 1970) is a Ghanaian politician who is a member of the New Patriotic Party. He is the member of parliament for the Binduri constituency in the Upper East Region. He is the current Deputy Minister for Ministry of Works and Housing and also serve on the Committee on Government Assurance as the Vice Chairman.

== Early life and education ==
Abanga was born in Akwatia a town in the Eastern Region of the Republic of Ghana on 25 May 1970 but he hails from Binduri/Bawku in the Upper East Region of the Republic of Ghana. He attended Akwatia L/A Primary School and later continued at Bansi Primary School in Binduri and had his High School at Bawku Junior High School, and later had his Senior High School education at the Ghana Secondary School (Ghanasco), in Tamale. From Tamale Polytechnic now Tamale Technical University, he obtained his Diploma certificate in Business Studies in Accounting. In 1998, he graduated from the University of Cape Coast with a Bachelor of Commerce (BCom) degree certificate. He also holds a master's degree in Development Finance, Professional Chartered Accountant Certificate in 2005 from the Institute of Chartered Accountants of Ghana.

== Personal life ==
Abanga is from Binduri/Bawku in the Upper East Region of the Republic of Ghana and a Muslim as well. In January 2001 – March 2007, he was appointed to serve as the Finance Officer for the National Governance Programme (NGP) and from 2007 -2008, served as the Management Accountant at the Millennium Challenge Account of the Ghana Programme. Abanga is Muslim.

== Political life ==
In 2020, on the ticket of the New Patriotic Party, Abanga took over the parliamentary seat from the National Democratic Party (NDC) aspirant Robert Baba Kuganab-Lem in the 2020 election. With about 454 votes more than his counterpart Robert Baba Kuganab-Lem of the NDC, Abanga won the Binduri constituency 2020 election to overtake the dominant NDC domination in the constituency.
