= Joseph Kwame Kumah =

Ghanaian politician

Hon. Joseph Kwame Kumah
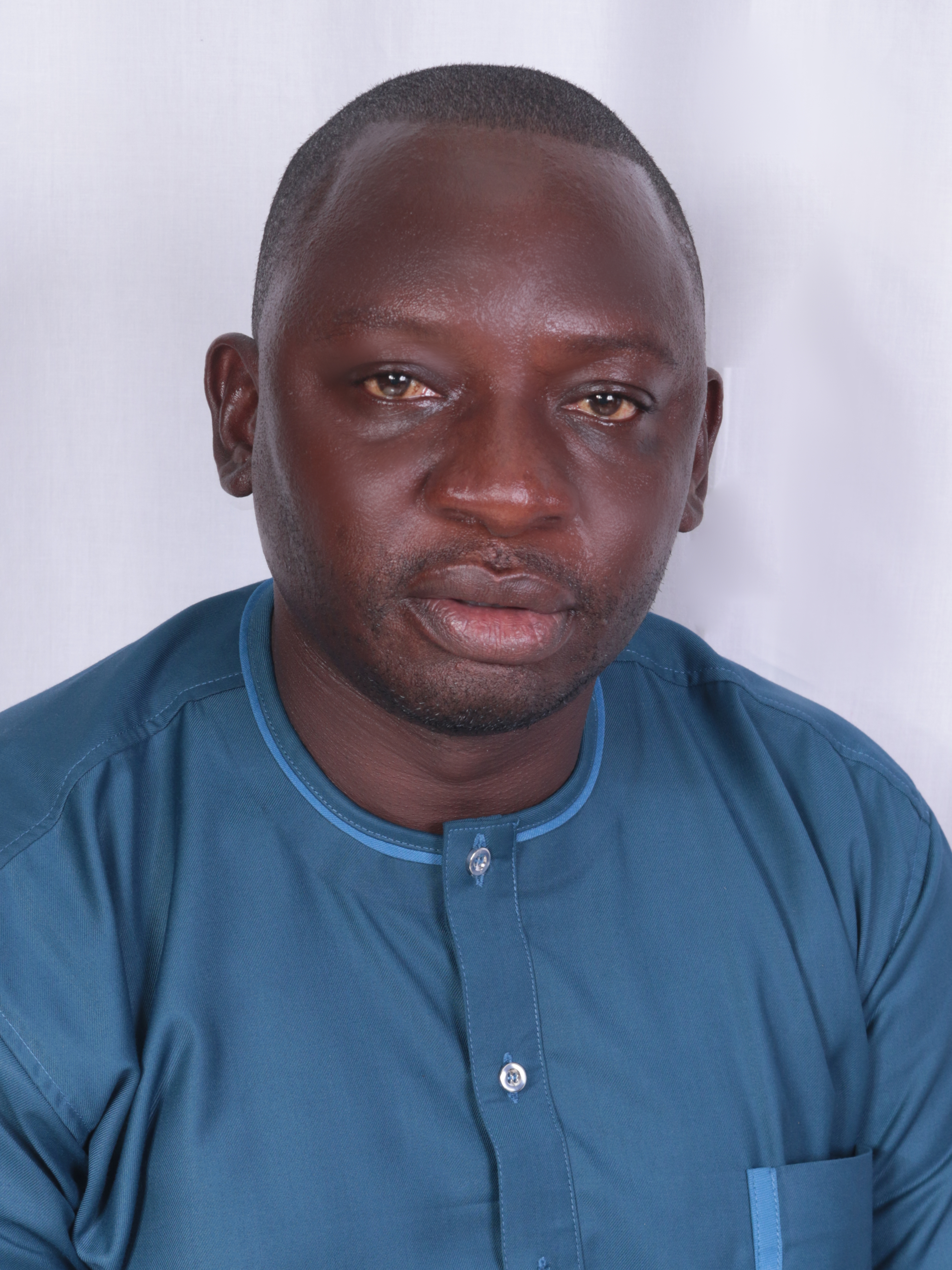
- Incumbent
- Assumed office 7 January 2017
- President: Nana Akufo-Addo

Member of the Ghana Parliament for Kintampo North Constituency

Personal details
- Born: 24 January 1974 (age 52) Sugliboi, Ghana
- Party: National Democratic Congress
- Profession: Educationist
- Committees: Judiciary Committee; Education Committee

Joseph Kwame Kumah (born 24 January 1974) is a Ghanaian politician who currently serves as the Member of the Parliament of Ghana for the Kintampo North constituency.

== Early life and education ==
Kumah was born on 24 January 1974 and is Sugliboi in the Bono East Region of Ghana. He achieved a bachelor's degree in education in 1999. In 2010, he graduated with a postgraduate certificate in Public Administration. He later received a Master of Arts degree in Local Government Administration and Organization from the Institute of Local Government Studies.

== Career ==
Kumah was a house master at the Ghana Education Service.

== Political career ==
Kumah is a member of the National Democratic Congress. He was elected as the Member of Parliament for Kintampo North in the 2020 Ghanaian general election. He won with 33,460 votes (62.98% of the votes cast). The NPP candidate, Micheal Sarkodie Baffoe, came second with 16,499 (31.05%).

=== Committees ===
Kumah is a member of the Judiciary Committee and also a member of the Education Committee.

== Personal life ==
Kumah is a Christian.
