= Robert Baba Kuganab-Lem =

Ghanaian politician

Member of the Ghana Parliament for Binduri Constituency
- In office 7 January 2009 – 7 January 2021
- Succeeded by: Abdulai Abanga

Personal details
- Born: 24 November 1966 (age 59)
- Party: National Democratic Congress

Robert Baba Kuganab-Lem is a Ghanaian politician and a former member of the Seventh Parliament of the Fourth Republic of Ghana representing the Binduri Constituency in the Upper East Region on the ticket of the National Democratic Congress.

== Early life and education ==
Between 1994 and 1996, he worked as a research assistant at Kintampo Health Research. From 1999 until 2016, he lectured at the University for Development Studies before being appointed deputy minister for local government.

Robert has a BA with honors from the University of Ghana, an MSC from Kwame Nkrumah University of Science and Technology, a Ph.D. from Keele University in the United Kingdom, an MPHE from Suez Canal University in Egypt, and an MSC from the University of Ghana.

== Personal life ==
Robert baba kaganab-Lem is a christian.
