= Hemang Lower Denkyira (Ghana parliament constituency) =

Constituency in the Central Region of Ghana

- constituency for the Parliament of Ghana
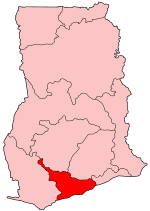
- District: Twifo/Heman/Lower Denkyira District
- Region: Central Region of Ghana

Current constituency
- Created: 2004
- Party: New Patriotic Party
- MP: Lawrence Agyinsam

Hemang Lower Denkyirais one of the constituencies represented in the Parliament of Ghana. It elects one member of parliament (MP) by the first past the post system of election. Lawrence Agyinsam is the member of parliament for the constituency. The Hemang Lower Denkyira constituency is located in the Twifo/Heman/Lower Denkyira district of the Central Region of Ghana.

== Boundaries ==
The seat is located entirely within the Twifo/Heman/Lower Denkyira district of the Central Region of Ghana.

== History ==
The constituency was first created in 2004 by the Electoral Commission of Ghana along with 29 other new ones, increasing the number of constituencies from 200 to 230.

== Members of Parliament ==
Election	Member	Party
2004	Benjamin Bimpong Donkor	New Patriotic Party

== Elections ==
Benjamin Bimpong Donkor, the current MP for the Assin South constituency was first elected in the constituency's first ever election in 2004. He retained his seat by a majority of 476 (2.4%) in the 2008 parliamentary election.

== See also ==
- List of Ghana Parliament constituencies
- Twifo/Heman/Lower Denkyira District
