= Samuel Erickson Abakah =

Ghanaian politician (born 1959)

Hon Samuel Erickson Abakah
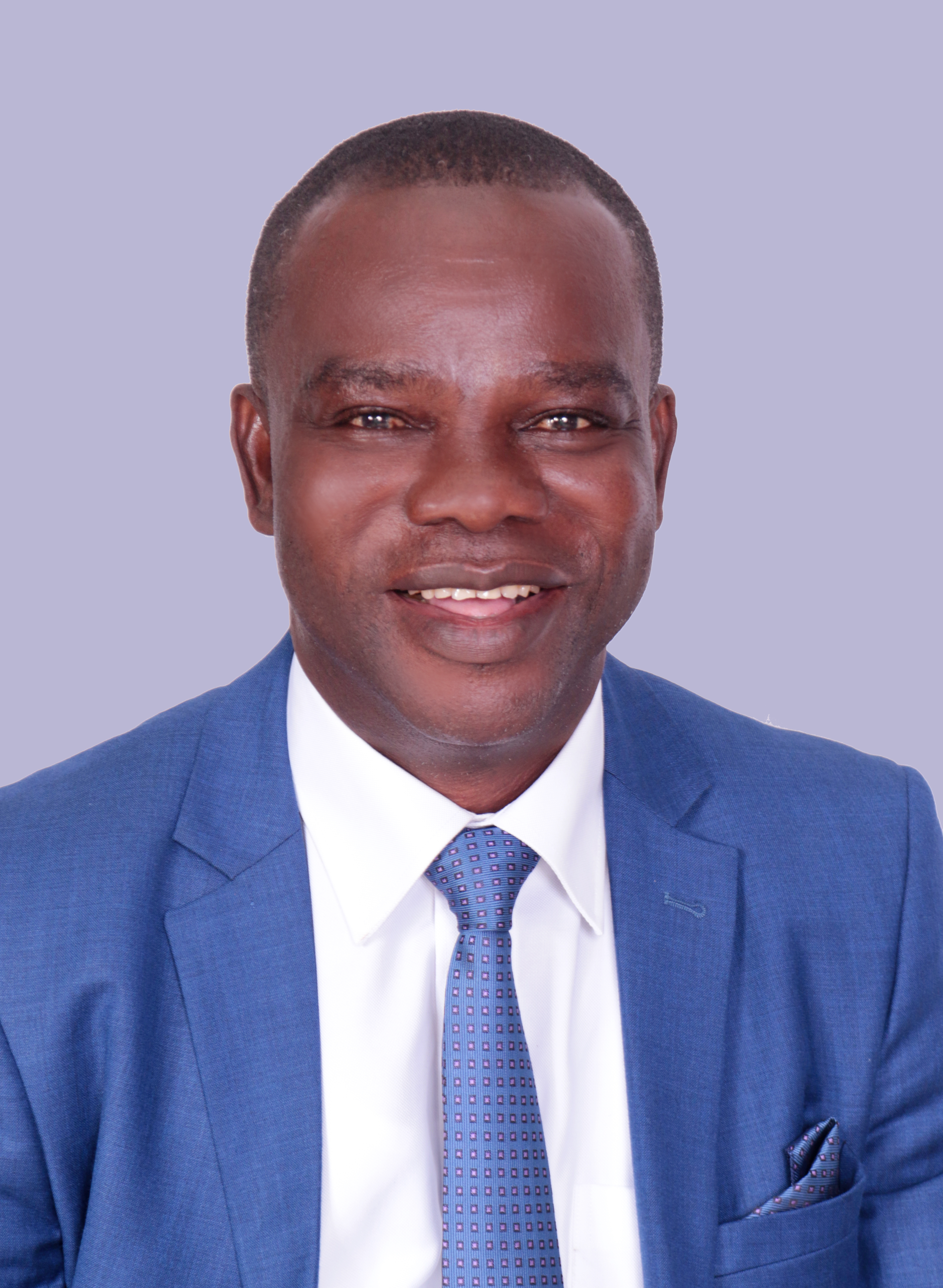

Member of the Ghana Parliament for Shama Constituency
- In office 7 January 2021 – 6 January 2025

Personal details
- Born: Samuel Erickson Abakah; 10 October 1959 (age 66) Abuesi
- Party: New Patriotic Party
- Occupation: Politician
- Committees: Employment, Social Welfare and State Enterprises Committee, Special Budget Committee

Samuel Erickson Abakah (born 10 October 1959) is a Ghanaian politician and member of the New Patriotic Party. He was the member of parliament for the Shama Constituency, in the Western Region of Ghana From 7 January 2021 to 6 January 2025.

== Early life and education ==
Abakah hails from Abuesi and is a barrister who qualified in 2000.

== Career ==
He was the Head of Chambers at Ogyefo Chambers.

=== Politics ===
He defeated Ato Panford in the National Patriotic Party 2020 primary elections and thereby became the flagbearer for the party in that constituency. He amassed 22,774 votes, which was 50.94% of the total votes cast.

== Personal life ==
He is a Christian.
