= Tatale-Sanguli (Ghana parliament constituency) =

Ghana parliament constituency

- constituency for the Parliament of Ghana
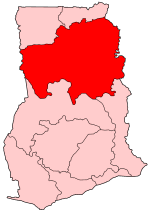
- District: Zabzugu/Tatale District
- Region: Northern Region of Ghana

Current constituency
- Party: NDC
- MP: Ntebe Ayo William

Tatale-Sanguli is one of the constituencies represented in the Parliament of Ghana. It elects one Member of Parliament (MP) by the first past the post system of election. Ntebe Ayo William is the member of parliament for the constituency. The Tatale-Sanguli constituency is located in the Zabzugu/Tatale District of the Northern Region of Ghana.

== Boundaries ==
The seat is located entirely within the Zabzugu/Tatale District of the Northern Region of Ghana.

== Members of Parliament ==
Election	Member	Party
2016	Tampi Acheampong Simon	NDC

Ghanaian parliamentary election, 2016 : Tatale-Sanguli Source:Peacefmonline
Party	Candidates	Votes	%
NDC	Tampi Acheampong Simon	9,371	38.81
NPP	Thomas Mbomba	7,027	29.10
IND	James Cecil Yanwube	6,477	26.82
PPP	Wumborapak Nkpebe Peter	791	3.28
CPP	Serchen Komba	482	2.00

== See also ==
- List of Ghana Parliament constituencies
- List of political parties in Ghana
