= Samuel Abdulai Jabanyite =

Ghanaian politician

Member of the Ghana Parliament for Chereponi Constituency

Personal details
- Born: 4 May 1972 (age 54)
- Party: National Democratic Congress

Samuel Abdulai Jabanyite is a Ghanaian politician and member of the Seventh Parliament of the Fourth Republic of Ghana representing the Chereponi Constituency in the Northern Region on the ticket of the National Democratic Congress.

== Early life ==
Abdulai obtained a B.Ed. (Social Studies) from the University of Cape Coast, a Master of Governance certificate from the School of Governance and Leadership, GIMPA, certificates from Cranfield University, Ghana Armed Forces and Staff Command College, the Management Development and Productivity Institute, the Institute of Local Government Studies, and Madison Pine, U.K.

== Political career ==
Some years ago, a video circulated online of Jabanyite breaking down after watching a JoyNews documentary on the protracted conflict in Ghana’s North-East region following another episode of political bloodshed. In 2026, he led a team from the Ghana Standards Authority to participate in a workshop organized by the Ministry of Trade, Agribusiness and Industry. He has been the MP for Chereponi since 2012, became the CEO of Satco Limited in 2013, and assumed the role of Board Chairman of the YEA in 2015.He is currently the Deputy Director-General in charge of General Services at the Ghana Standards Authority.
