= Pru West (Ghana parliament constituency) =

Constituency in the Bono East Region of Ghana

- constituency for the Parliament of Ghana
- District: Pru District
- Region: Bono East Region of Ghana

Current constituency
- Party: National Democratic Congress
- MP: Emmanuel Kofi Ntekuni

Pru West is one of the constituencies represented in the Parliament of Ghana. It elects one Member of Parliament (MP) by the first past the post system of election. Emmanuel Kofi Ntekuni is the member of parliament for the constituency. He succeeded Stephen Jalulah. Pru West is located in the Pru District of the Bono East Region.

== Boundaries ==
The seat is located within the Pru District of the Bono East Region of Ghana.

== Members of Parliament ==
Election	Member	Party
2016 2012	ALHAJI MASAWUD MOHAMMED	NDC

== Elections ==
Ghanaian parliamentary election, 2016 :Pru West Source : Peacefmonline
Party	Candidate	Votes	%
NDC	ALHAJI MASAWUD MOHAMMED	10,740	49.66
NPP	STEPHEN PAMBIIN JALULAH	10,698	49.47
PPP	ASAMOAH KWABENA ERIC	145	0.67
CPP	AKURUGU ZAKARIA ATIAH	43	0.20

Ghanaian parliamentary election, 2012 :Pru West Source : Peacefmonline
Party	Candidate	Votes	%
NDC	ALHAJI MASAWUD MOHAMMED	9,465	48.59
NPP	STEPHEN PAMBIIN JALULAH	8,278	42.50
IND	ABDULLAHI YAKUBU	1,082	5.55
IND	ADU SAMPSON	653	3.35

== See also ==
- List of Ghana Parliament constituencies
- List of political parties in Ghana
