= Bolgatanga (Ghana parliament constituency) =

Ghana parliament constituency

- constituency for the Parliament of Ghana
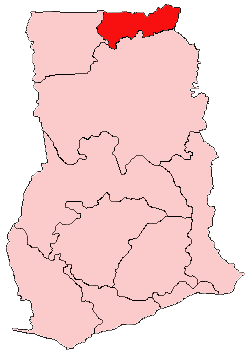
- District: Bolgatanga Municipal District
- Region: Upper East Region of Ghana

Current constituency
- Party: National Democratic Congress
- MP: Isaac Adongo

Bolgatanga is one of the constituencies represented in the Parliament of Ghana. It elects one Member of Parliament (MP) by the first past the post system of election. Isaac Adongo is the member of parliament for the constituency. Bolgatanga is located in the Bolgatanga Municipal district of the Upper East Region of Ghana.

== Boundaries ==
The seat is located within the Bolgatanga Municipal District in the Upper East Region of Ghana.

== Members of Parliament ==
Election	Member	Party
1992	Akake Patrick	National Democratic Congress
1996	Simon Anyoa Abingya	National Democratic Congress
2000	David Apasera	People's National Convention
2008	Emmanuel Opam-Brown Akolbire	National Democratic Congress
2012	Dominic Akuritinga Ayine	National Democratic Congress
2016	Dominic Akuritinga Ayine	National Democratic Congress
2020	Dominic Akuritinga Ayine	National Democratic Congress
2024	Isaac Adongo	National Democratic Congress

== Elections ==
2008 Ghanaian parliamentary election: Bolgatanga Source:Ghana Home Page
Party	Candidate	Votes	%	±%
National Democratic Congress	Emmanuel Opam-Brown Akolbire	28,656	57.7	+23.6
New Patriotic Party	Mercy Alima Musah A.	10,063	20.2	−3.3
People's National Convention	David Apasera	10,009	20.1	−18.4
Convention People's Party	Evelyn Lamisi Anabila	640	1.3	+0.2
Democratic Freedom Party	Anyema Robert Abiiro	229	0.5	—
Democratic People's Party	Awuni Atiah Solomon	97	0.2	−0.5
Majority		18,592	37.5	
Turnout				—

2004 Ghanaian parliamentary election: Bolgatanga Source:National Electoral Commission, Ghana
Party	Candidate	Votes	%	±%
People's National Convention	David Apasera	18,948	38.6	−12.3
National Democratic Congress	Emmanuel Opam-Brown Akolbire	16,743	34.1	+2.1
New Patriotic Party	Gheysika Adombire Agambila	11,547	23.5	+9.2
Independent	Amoshie Baba Julius	954	1.9	—
Convention People's Party	Evelyn Lamisi Anabila	564	1.1	+0.3
Democratic People's Party	Awuni Atiah Solomon	345	0.7	—
Majority		2,205	4.5	—
Turnout		50,427	81.3	—

2000 Ghanaian parliamentary election: Bolgatanga Source:Adam Carr's Election Archives
Party	Candidate	Votes	%	±%
People's National Convention	David Apasera	20,459	50.9	+29.7
National Democratic Congress	Simon Anyoa Abingya	12,884	32.0	−37.9
New Patriotic Party	Gheysika Adombire Agambila	5,770	14.3	+7.4
National Reform Party	Martin R M A Minstapm	511	1.3	—
Convention People's Party	Emmanuel A Ajusiyah	305	0.8	—
United Ghana Movement	Baba Mohammed	274	0.7	—
Majority				—

1996 Ghanaian parliamentary election: Bolgatanga Source:Electoral Commission of Ghana
Party	Candidate	Votes	%	±%
National Democratic Congress	Simon Anyoa Abingya	26,816	69.9	—
People's National Convention	David Apasera	15,577	21.2	—
New Patriotic Party	James Ben Kaba	3,861	6.9	—
National Convention Party	Amiyinne Francis	956	2.0	—
Majority		11,239	48.7	—
Turnout		25,077	81.3	—

== See also ==
- List of Ghana Parliament constituencies
