= David Apasera =

Ghanaian politician

People's National Convention candidate for President of Ghana
- Election date 7 December 2020
- Running mate: Divine Ayivor
- Opponents: Nana Akufo-Addo (NPP); John Mahama (NDC) and 9 others
- Incumbent: Nana Akufo-Addo (NPP)

Personal details
- Born: 25 April 1962 (age 64) Ghana
- Party: People's National Convention
- Children: 4
- Occupation: Politician
- Profession: Self-employed
- Known for: Leader of Forum for Former members of parliament

David Asibi Ayindenaba Apasera is a Ghanaian politician. He was the presidential candidate for the People's National Convention (PNC) in the 2020 Ghanaian general election. He was member of parliament for Bolgatanga in the Upper East Region of Ghana between 2001 and 2009.

== Early life and education ==
Apasera was born in Ghana and went through his basic education in the country.

== Career ==
Apasera is a self-employed Ghanaian politician.

== Parliamentary elections ==
Apasera first run for elections in the 1996 Ghanaian general election where he contested the Bolgatanga constituency seat on the People's National Convention's (PNC) ticket. He came second with about 21% of the vote. He however beat the incumbent MP, Simon Abingya of the National Democratic Congress (NDC) in the 2000 election for the same seat to become the Member of Parliament for Bolgatanga with 50.9% of the votes and with a majority of 7,575. Apasera retained his seat in the 2004 general election, winning 38.6% of the total votes cast but with a reduced majority of 2,205 votes. He was one of six MPs from the PNC and CPP together with an independent MP who went into alliance with the NPP in parliament in 2005. In the 2008 general election, he came third, behind Emmanuel Akolbire of the NDC and Mercy Alima Musah of the New Patriotic Party (NPP) with 20.1% of the total votes cast. This brought his tenure as member of parliament for Bolgatanga to an end of the fourth parliament of the Fourth Republic on 6 January 2009.

Before the 2012 election, the Bolgatanga constituency was reconfigured into the Bolgatanga Central and Bolgatanga East constituencies. Apasera beat Rockson Akugre by 100 votes to 83 for the PNC nomination to contest the Bolgatanga East seat. He however failed to win, coming third with 13.1% of the votes. Apasera contested the PNC primaries for the Bolgatanga East seat prior to the 2016 election. A dispute developed between him and Bernard Mornah, the PNC chairman at the time. He accused Mornah of deleting his name from the list submitted by the party to the Electoral Commission of Ghana. He ultimately did not make it onto the ballot box.

== Presidential election ==
In 2020 however, he managed to secure the nomination of the party to contest the 2020 Ghanaian general election as their presidential candidate. His running mate was Divine Ayivor. He is one of twelve candidates for the election.

== Forum for Former members of parliament ==
David Apasera was the leader of the Forum for Former members of parliament. He lobbied hard for a form of pension scheme and other emoluments for former MPs. He fought for the pension rights all the way to the Supreme Court of Ghana. Justice Gbadegbe, in his valedictory judgement declared as unconstitutional the Chinery Hesse report recommending the pensions which was the basis for his campaign.

== Personal life ==
Apasera is a Christian. He is married with four children.

== See also ==
- Bolgatanga constituency
- People's National Convention

Party political offices
Preceded by Edward Mahama	People's National Convention presidential candidate 2020	Most recent
Parliament of Ghana
Preceded by Simon Abingya	MP for Bolgatanga; 2001–2009	Succeeded by Emmanuel Akolbire
