= Gaaga Akayeri Azitariga =

Ghanaian politician

Member of the Ghana Parliament for Bongo
- In office 7 January 1993 – 6 January 1997
- President: Jerry John Rawlings
- Preceded by: Asoko Asampambila
- Succeeded by: Simon Alangde Asabo

Personal details
- Born: 14 February 1953 (age 73) Zorkor-Ganga, Upper East Region, Ghana (then Gold Coast)
- Party: National Democratic Congress
- Education: Navrongo Senior High School
- Alma mater: Bagabaga College of Education; St. Andrews College of Agriculture
- Occupation: Politician
- Profession: Teacher

Gaaga Akayeri Azitariga (born 11 February 1953) is a Ghanaian politician who served as a member of the First parliament of the Fourth Republic representing the Bongo constituency in the Upper East Region of Ghana.

== Early life and education ==
Azitariga was born on 11 February 1953 at Zorkor-Ganga in the Upper East Region. He attended Navrongo Secondary School and the Bagabaga Training College where he obtained his Teachers' Training Certificate. He continued at the St. Andrews College of Agriculture where he was awarded his Diploma in Agriculture, he also received a Bachelor of Education (B.ED) in Agricultural Education from the University of Education Winneba (UEW).

== Politics ==
Azitariga was first elected into Parliament on the ticket of the National Democratic Congress during the 1992 Ghanaian parliamentary election to represent the Bongo constituency in the Upper East Region of Ghana. He served for one term in parliament and was subsequently succeeded by Simon Alangde Asabo also of the National Democratic Congress. Asabo polled 22,695 votes out of the total valid votes cast representing 59.80% during the 1996 General election, his opponents, John Adobongo Atanga and Emmanuel Akobire Adosenaba polled 4,409 votes (representing 11.60% of the total valid votes cast) and 2,676 votes (representing 7.10% of the total valid votes cast) respectively.

== Career ==
Gaaga Akayeri Azitariga is a teacher by profession and a former member of parliament for the Bongo Constituency in the Upper East Region of Ghana.

== Personal life ==
He is a Christian.
