= David Apasara =

Ghanaian politician

Hon. David Apasara
- Preceded by: Simon Anyoa Abingya
- Succeeded by: Akolbire Emmanuel Opam-Brown

Member of Parliament for Bolgatanga Constituency
- In office 7 January 2005 – 6 January 2009
- President: John Kufuor

Personal details
- Born: 25 April 1962 (age 64)
- Party: National Democratic Congress
- Occupation: Self employed

David Apasera is a Ghanaian politician of the Republic of Ghana. He was the Member of Parliament representing Bolgatanga constituency of the Upper East Region of Ghana in the 4th Parliament of the 4th Republic of Ghana. He is a member of the People's National Convention.

== Early life and education ==
Apasera was born on April 25, 1962. He holds a GCE A Level certificate.

== Career ==
Apasera is a self-employed Ghanaian politician.

== Political career ==
Apasera was a member of the People's National Convention. He became a member of parliament from January 2001 after emerging winner in the General Election in December 2000. He was elected as the member of parliament for the Bolgatanga constituency in the fourth parliament of the fourth Republic of Ghana.

== Elections ==
Apasera was elected as the member of parliament for the Bolgatanga constituency of the Upper East Region of Ghana for the first time in the 2000 Ghanaian general elections. He won on the ticket of the People's National Convention. His constituency was a part of the 3 parliamentary seats out of 13 seats won by the National Democratic Congress in that election for the Upper East Region.

The People's National Convention won a minority total of 4 parliamentary seats out of 230 seats. He was elected with 18,948 votes out of 49,101 total valid votes cast. This was equivalent to 38.6% of total valid votes cast. He was elected over Gheysika Adombire Agambila of the New Patriotic Party, Akolbire Emmanuel Opam-Brown of the National Democratic Congress, Evelyn Lamisi Anabila of the Convention People's Party, Awuni Atiah Solomon of the Democratic People's Party and Amoshie Baba Julius an independent candidate.

These obtained 11,547, 16,743, 564, 345 and 954 votes respectively of total votes cast. These were equivalent to 23.5%, 43.1%, 0.8%, 0.3% and 3.7% respectively of total valid votes cast.

== Personal life ==
Apasera is a Christian. Apasera ia married with four children.

== See also ==
- List of MPs elected in the 2004 Ghanaian parliamentary election
