= Prince Kojo-Hilton =

Ghanaian art director

Amb Prince Kojo-Hilton
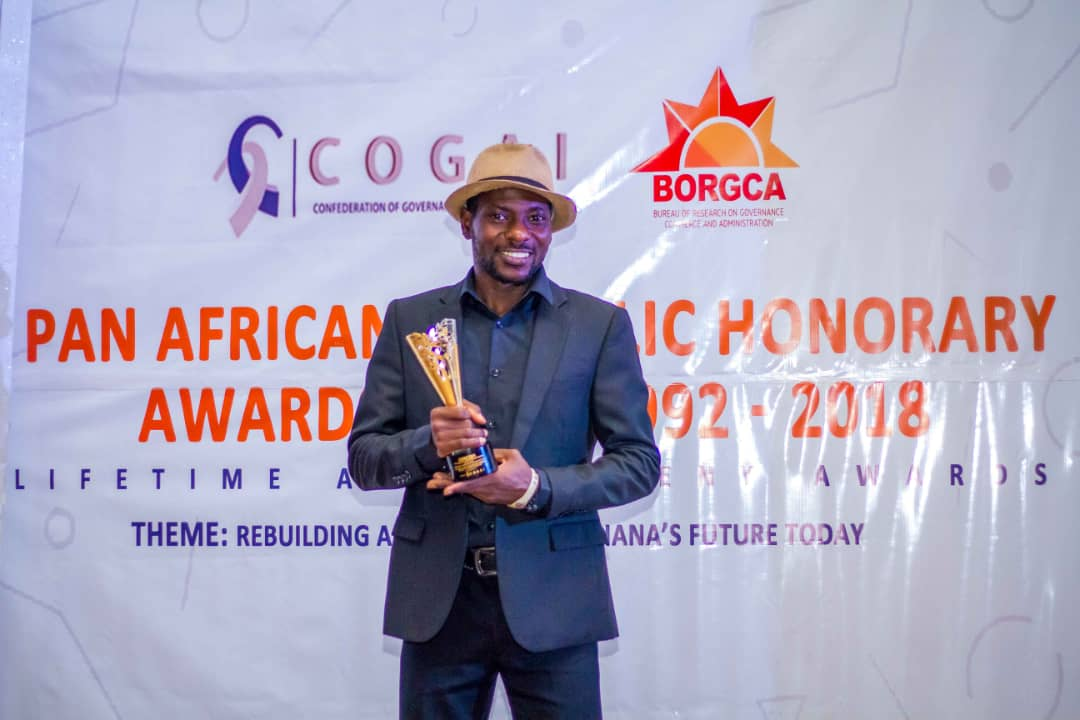
- Born: 7 December 1981 (age 44); Accra, Ghana
- Notable work: Beast of No Nation, Sense8, Black Earth Rising, Sink or Swim

Prince Kojo-Hilton (born 7 December 1981) is a Ghanaian art director known for his work in the Ghanaian visual art industry.

He is an ambassador to the United States Presidential Service Center and the chairperson for US Presidential Service Center International Film Festival. He worked as a scenic designer in Sense8 and Beast of No Nation and as an art director in Guldkyten, a 2015 movie about the Danish Gold Coast.

== Early life and education ==
Kojo-Hilton was born in Accra, Ghana, where he has lived for most of his life. His interest in art and design developed at a young age, and he graduated with a certificate in art direction and production design from the National Film and Television Institute in 2014.

== Career ==
Kojo-Hilton began his career in the industry working in the Technical Department of the National Theatre of Ghana. He joined Roverman Productions in 2008 and worked on makeup transformation for the stage play Unhappy Wives, Confused Husbands, written by Uncle Ebo Whyte. In 2013, he built the first man-made volcano for the Guinness Big Eruption Concert in Ghana, headlined by Akon who performed in a transparent giant ball and Big Sean, with guest performances by Wizkid, Shatta Wale and Samini.

He gained international recognition in 2014 working as a scenic painter for the science fiction drama series, Sense8, which was written and co-directed by creators of the Matrix trilogy, Andy Wachowski and Lana Wachowski.

In 2015, Kojo-Hilton worked as a scenic designer for Beast of No Nation, directed by Idris Elba and lead actor, Abraham Attah.

In 2023, Kojo-Hilton recreated scenic design for the stage play of The Dilemma of a Ghost, in memory of Ama Ata Aidoo.

== Awards and recognition ==
In 2016, Kojo-Hilton received the Osagyefo Pan African Eminence Art Director award. In 2017, he received an honorary doctorate from the University of Ghana School of Performing Arts, and was nominated for the Global Art Award in the category of the Ultimate Best Global Artist Award.

In 2018, two of his best stage design works were selected and displayed at the Prague Quadrennial of Performance Design and Space in the Czech Republic.

Then in 2019, Kojo-Hilton was honored with a Citation of Inspiration from the University of Yale and received an honorary doctorate from the International Forum for Creativity and Humanity in Morocco. Later in 2019, the Confederation of Governance Assessment Institute honored him as the ambassador for Pan African Art in Africa.

Prince also won the Theatre Arts Category at 40 under 40 awards in 2019.

In 2020, 2021 and 2022 Prince was the first Ghanaian to win the Visual Art category award three times in a row at the Extraordinary People Award

== Production credits ==
Production design credits for Kojo-Hilton:

Director	Role	Project	Year
Uncle Ebo Whyte	Makeup transformation	Unhappy Wives, Confused Husbands	2008
The Wachowskis	Scenic painter	Sense8	2014
	Production designer	Sink or Swim	2014
Idris Elba	Scenic designer	Beasts of No Nation	2015`
Haslund	Art director	Guldkyten	2015
Fiifi Coleman Production	Scenic designer	The Dilemma of A Ghost	2023
