= Simon Atingban Akunye =

Ghanaian politician

Hon. Simon Atingban Akunye

Member of Parliament for Pusiga Constituency
- In office 7 January 2009 – 6 January 2013
- President: John Atta Mills; John Mahama

Member of Parliament for Pusiga Constituency
- In office 7 January 2005 – 6 January 2009
- President: John Kufuor

Personal details
- Born: 2 February 1964 (age 62)
- Party: National Democratic Congress
- Education: Bawku Nursing College
- Profession: Nurse

Simon Atingban Akunye (born 2 February 1954) is a Ghanaian politician. He was a member of the Fifth Parliament of the Fourth Republic of Ghana, representing the Pusiga constituency in the Upper east region of Ghana.

== Early life and education ==
Akunye was born on February 2, 1954. He is a hails from Pusiga in the Upper East Region of Ghana. He is a registered general nurse. He obtained his nursing certificate in Nigeria. This was in 1984. He also holds an Executive master's degree in Governance and Leadership from the Ghana Institute of Management and Public Administration. He acquired the certificate in 2008.

== Career ==
Akunye is a senior nursing officer at Akunye Memorial Clinic.

== Politics ==
Akunye was first voted into parliament on the ticket of the National Democratic Congress during the 2004 Ghanaian general elections. He run for a second term in office in 2008 in which he won. However, he lost the National Democratic Congress primaries in 2016.Thereafter, he decided to go Independent during the 2016 Ghanaian parliamentary elections, but lost the Pusiga seat to Laadi Ayii Ayamba of the National Democratic Congress.

== Elections ==
Akunye was elected as the member of parliament for the Pusiga constituency of the Upper East Region of Ghana in the 2004 Ghanaian general elections. He won on the ticket of the National Democratic Congress. His constituency was a part of the 9 parliamentary seats out of 13 seats won by the National Democratic Congress in that election for the Upper East Region. The National Democratic Congress won a minority total of 94 parliamentary seats out of 230 seats. He was elected with 12,112 votes out of 18,700 total valid votes cast. This was equivalent to 64.8% of total valid votes cast. He was elected over Yahaya Seidu Awinaba of the New Patriotic Party. He obtained 6,588 votes of total votes cast. This was equivalent to 35.2% of total valid votes cast.

In 2008, he was elected as the member of parliament for the same constituency. He won on the ticket of the National Democratic Congress. He was elected with 8,803 votes out of 15,684 total valid votes cast. This was equivalent to 56.13% of total valid votes cast. He was elected over Azongo Peter Tasiri of the Peoples’ National Convention, Mohammed Imoro Asoko of the New Patriotic Party and Abugbila Daniel of the Convention People's Party. These obtained 391, 5,021 and 1,469 votes respectively of total votes cast. These were equivalent to 2.49%, 32.01% and 9.37% respectively of total valid votes cast.

== Personal life ==
He is a Catholic and married with eight children.

== See also ==
- Pusiga (Ghana parliamentary constituency)
