= Misbahu Mahama Adams =

Ghanaian chartered accountant and politician

Hon. Misbahu Mahama Adams

Member of Parliament for Mion
- Incumbent
- Assumed office 7 January 2025
- President: John Mahama

Personal details
- Born: September 15, 1980 (age 45) Sang, Ghana
- Party: National Democratic Congress (NDC)
- Education: Institute of Chartered Accountants, Ghana (ICAG); University of London; University of Ghana; GIMPA; Tamale Polytechnic; Navrongo Senior High School
- Occupation: Chartered Accountant, Politician

Misbahu Mahama Adams (born 15 September 1980) is a Ghanaian chartered accountant and politician. He is the Member of Parliament for the Mion Constituency in the Northern Region of Ghana. He was elected on the ticket of the National Democratic Congress (NDC) in the 2024 general elections and assumed office in January 2025.

== Early life and education ==
Adams hails from Sang in the Northern Region of Ghana. He attended Navrongo Senior High School, completing his Secondary School Certificate Examination in 1998. He obtained a Higher National Diploma (HND) from Tamale Polytechnic in 2002 and a bachelor's degree from the Ghana Institute of Management and Public Administration (GIMPA) in 2006.

He proceeded to the University of Ghana, where he earned an MSc in 2012, followed by an LLB from the University of London in 2018. Adams became a member of the Institute of Chartered Accountants, Ghana (ICAG) in 2010.

== Career ==
Before entering politics, Adams worked with the Controller and Accountant-General's Department, where he held key roles including Deputy Head of the National Treasury and Head of Research and Development.Minister counsellor/ treasurer officer at Ghana's emabsssy to Italy from 2016 to 2021. He contested and won the Mion parliamentary seat in the 2024 general elections on the ticket of the National Democratic Congress and assumed office in January 2025. In Parliament, he serves on the Information and Communications Committee and the Backbenchers' Business Committee.
