= Bernard Mornah =

Ghanaian politician

Flagbearer of the People's National Convention (PNC)
- Incumbent
- Assumed office September 2024
- Preceded by: David Apasera

National Chairman of the People's National Convention (PNC)

Personal details
- Born: Bernard Anbataayela Mornah
- Party: People's National Convention (PNC)
- Education: University of Cape Coast; Hochschule für Technik und Wirtschaft
- Website: Official website

Bernard Anbataayela Mornah is a Ghanaian politician and the flagbearer of the People's National Convention (PNC).

== Early life and education ==
Mornah had his bachelor's degree in Economics and Sociology from the University of Cape Coast in 2003. He further had his master's degree in International Development and Economics from the Hochschule für Technik und Wirtschaft (University of Applied Science) Berlin in Germany.

== Career ==
Mornah is the Chief Farming Officer (CFO) of Langdi Paradise Farms. He is also the President of Kalibi Sporting Club. Chairman of Yiriyela Enterprise. He is also the Secretary of the ECOWAS Interim steering committee of Forum of West African Political Parties (FOWAPP). He served as West Africa Coordinator of the Pan African Federalist Movement

== Political career ==
Mornah rose through the ranks to become the National Chairman of the People's National Convention. He served as the first elected General Secretary in 2007-2012 after serving as National Youth Organiser (PNC). Currently, he is the Presidential Candidate and Leader of the People's National Convention (PNC). Mornah won by 1,138 votes whiles David Apasera had 216 votes.

== Controversy ==
In September 2024, the Electoral Commission of Ghana disqualified Mornah and other 11 candidates from contesting in the 2024 presidential election for failing to meet the requirements. He sued the Electoral Commission over his disqualification from the presidential race.
