= Mion (Ghana parliament constituency) =

Ghana parliament constituency

- constituency for the Parliament of Ghana
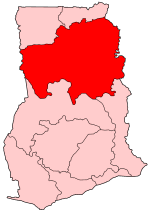
- District: Mion District
- Region: Northern Region of Ghana

Current constituency
- Party: National Democratic Congress
- MP: Misbahu Mahama Adams

Mion is one of the constituencies represented in the Parliament of Ghana. It elects one Member of Parliament (MP) by the first past the post system of election. It is located in the Northern Region of Ghana. Ahmed Alhassan Yakubu represent the constituency in the 4th, 5th and sixth Parliament of the Fourth Republic of Ghana. He was elected on the ticket of the National Democratic Congress (NDC) and won a majority of 85 votes more than candidate closest in the race, to win the constituency election to become the MP. He had also represented the constituency in the 4th Republican parliament on the ticket of the National Democratic Congress. Currently, Misbahu Adams Mahama is the member of parliament for the constituency.

== Members of Parliament ==
First elected	Member	Party
Created 1992
1996	Alabira Ibrahim	Convention People's Party
2000	Adams Ebenezer Mahama	National Democratic Congress
2004	Ahmed Alhassan Yakubu	National Democratic Congress
2008	Ahmed Alhassan Yakubu	National Democratic Congress
2012	Ahmed Alhassan Yakubu	National Democratic Congress
2016	Mohammed Abdul Aziz	National Democratic Congress
2020	Abdul-Aziz Ayaba Musah	New Patriotic Party
2024	Misbahu Mahama Adams	National Democratic Congress

== Elections ==
The following table shows the parliamentary election results for Mion constituency during the 1996 Ghanaian general election.

1996 Ghanaian parliamentary election: Mion Source:Ghana Home Page
Party	Candidate	Votes	%	±%
Convention People's Party	Alabira Ibrahim	9,519	32.70	—
People's National Convention	Iddisah Kojo Jacob	6,198	21.30	—
National Democratic Congress	Abu Musah	5, 220	18.00	—
New Patriotic Party	Fuseini Saaka Alidu	0	0.00	—
Majority		9, 519	32.70	—

The below table shows the parliamentary election results for Mion constituency in the 2000 Ghanaian general election.

2000 Ghanaian parliamentary election: Mion Source:Ghana Home Page
Party	Candidate	Votes	%	±%
National Democratic Congress	Adams Ebenezer Mahama	6,125	31.80	—
Convention People's Party	Alabira Ibrahim	5,578	29.00	—
People's National Convention	Iddisah Kojo Jacob	3,055	15.90	—
New Patriotic Party	Prince A. Baako	2,964	15.40	—
IND	Emmanuel B Lag	969	5.00	—
NRP	Stephen O. Yacham	559	2.90	—
Majority		6,125	31.80	—

The table below shows the parliamentary election results for Mion constituency during the 2004 Ghanaian general election.

2004 Ghanaian parliamentary election: Mion Source:Ghana Home Page
Party	Candidate	Votes	%	±%
National Democratic Congress	Ahmed Alhassan Yakubu	10,568	39.10	—
New Patriotic Party	Mahama Negin Kwas Samuel	10,307	38.10	—
Convention People's Party	Alabira Ibrahim	4,616	17.10	—
IND	Abu E. Musah	956	3.50	—
People's National Convention	Mabe Yarbey Gabriel	587	2.20	—
IND	Sulemana Abu	000	0.00	—
Majority		10,568	39.10	—

The following table shows the parliamentary election results for Mion constituency in the 2008 Ghanaian general election.

2008 Ghanaian parliamentary election: Mion Source:Ghana Home Page
Party	Candidate	Votes	%	±%
National Democratic Congress	Ahmed Alhassan Yakubu	11,977	44.17	—
New Patriotic Party	Mahama Negin Kwas Samuel	11,892	43.85	—
DFP	Iddisah Kojo Jacob	2,586	19.54	—
Convention People's Party	Yakubu Andani Iddrisu	663	2.44	—
IND	Sulemana Abu	000	0.00	—
Majority		11,977	44.17	—

The below table shows the parliamentary election results for Mion constituency during the 2012 Ghanaian general election.

2012 Ghanaian parliamentary election: Mion Source:Ghana Home Page
Party	Candidate	Votes	%	±%
National Democratic Congress	Ahmed Alhassan Yakubu	9,931	39.54	—
New Patriotic Party	Alhassan Shaibu	9,380	37.35	—
Progressive People's Party	Alhaji Alabira Ibrahim	4,062	16.17	—
Convention People's Party	Makamba Daniel Tamanja	913	3.64	—
IND	Jabab Daniel Ulenbi	717	2.85	—
NDP	Iddrisu Rashad Kpabiya	112	0.45	—
Majority		9,931	39.54	—

The following table shows the parliamentary election results for Mion constituency during the 2016 Ghanaian general election.

2016 Ghanaian parliamentary election: Mion Source:Ghana Home Page
Party	Candidate	Votes	%	±%
National Democratic Congress	Mohammed Abdul Aziz	15,954	58.48	—
New Patriotic Party	Mohammed Hashim Abdallah	10,127	37.12	—
Convention People's Party	Mbayun Philemon N- Naye	1, 222	4.11	—
People's National Convention	Sayibu Abdul Rauf	80	0.29	—
Majority		15, 954	58.48	—

The below table shows the parliamentary election results for Mion constituency in the 2020 Ghanaian general election.

2020 Ghanaian general election : Mion Source:Ghana Home Page
Party	Candidate	Votes	%	±%
New Patriotic Party	Abdul-Aziz Ayaba Musah	21,552	59.08	—
National Democratic Congress	Mohammed Abdul Aziz	14,158	38.81	—
IND	Waja Njaliku Elijah	609	1.67	—
People's National Convention	Sayibu Abdul- Rauf	161	0.44	—
Majority		21, 552	59.81	—

== See also ==
- List of Ghana Parliament constituencies
