= Alexander Afenyo-Markin =

Ghanaian politician

Hon Alexander Kwamina Afenyo-Markin
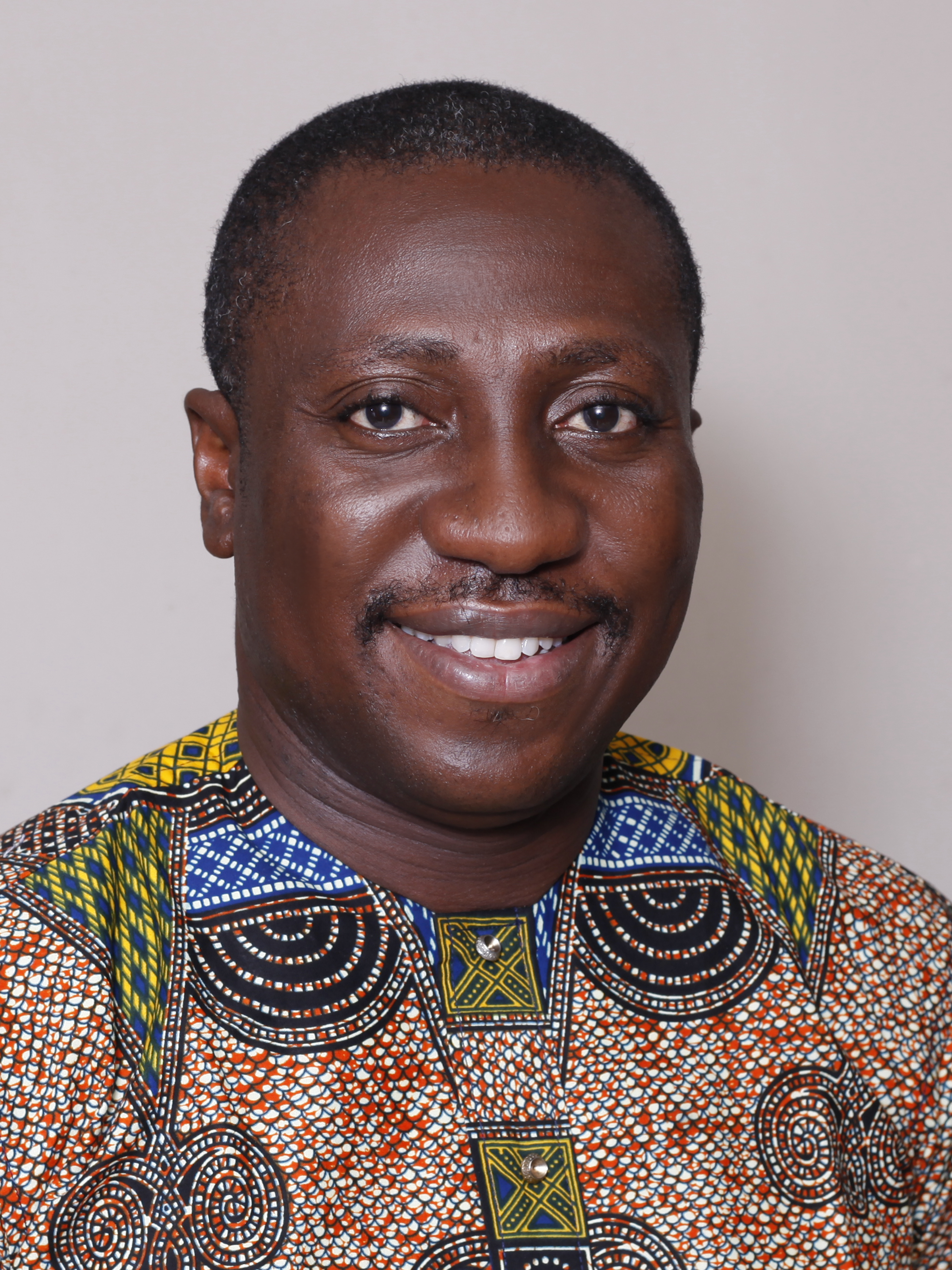

Member of the Ghana Parliament for Effutu
- Incumbent
- Assumed office 7 January 2021

Personal details
- Born: Alexander Kwamina Afenyo-Markin; 27 May 1978 (age 48) Winneba
- Party: New Patriotic Party
- Spouse: Dianne Markin
- Occupation: Politician
- Profession: Lawyer
- Committees: Appointments Committee, Business Committee, Finance Committee, Standing Orders Committee, Defence and Interior Committee, Committee of Selection

Alexander Kwamina Afenyo-Marlin (born 27 May 1978) is the Member of Parliament for the Effutu constituency, Central Region, Ghana. He serves on several committees, including the Committee on Defence and Interior.

He was the Deputy Majority Leader in the eighth Parliament of Ghana until February 2024, when he was promoted to Majority Leader as part of a reshuffle by President Nana Akufo-Addo and the leadership of the New Patriotic Party.

== Early life and education ==
He was born on 27 May 1978 and hails from Winneba in the Central Region of Ghana. He attended the STC Demonstration Prim. & JSS (1994) for his primary and junior high education. He attended St. Augustines College (1997) in Cape Coast for his senior high school education. He studied law at the University of Buckingham (LLB/MGT, 2003–2006) and the Ghana School of Law, where he received a Barrister at Law certification (2007–2009), and received an MA in international politics and security studies at the University of Bradford (2009–2011).

== Career ==
Between the years 1999 and 2003, the Effutu legislator worked as a Principal Postal Officer at the Ghana Post Company Limited. Also, he worked at the Excel Courier Ghana Limited as the Director between 2004 and 2011 and as an Associate at Dehenya Chambers from 2010 to 2016. He is also a managing partner at Afenyo-Markin, Okutu and Associates.

== Politics ==
In 2012, on the ticket of the NPP, Afenyo-Markin contested the NDC parliamentary candidate, Mike Allen Hammah and won.

He became the chairman of Ghana Water Company Ltd (GWCL) in 2017. He was alleged to have been involved in the near collapse of GWCL and other financial improprieties, over which he launched a defamation lawsuit in the court. He has been on the Committees of Defence, Interior and Finance in Ghana's Parliament respectively.

In 2021, Afenyo-Markin, together with Abdul-Aziz Ayaba Musah, Johnson Kwaku Adu, Laadi Ayii Ayamba and Emmanuel Kwasi Bedzrah, was sworn in during the Extraordinary Session 2021 of the Parliament of the ECOWAS, which happened in Freetown in Sierra Leone.

On 11 March 2024, during a debate on President Nana Addo Dankwah Akuffo-Addo's state of the nation address in parliament, he made a comment with regard to the running mate of former president John Mahama, Naana Jane Opoku Agyemang, which generated immediate controversy in parliament. The house was suspended for an hour, and he later retracted the statement.

In September 2022,following an investigative report by The Fourth Estate highlighting non-compliance among parliamentary leadership, Afenyo- Markin filed his asset and liabilities with Ghana Audit Service, explaining that his previous failure to file at the end of the 7th Parliament was due to a misunderstanding of the law.

== NPP Majority Leader ==
Afenyo-Markin, the Member of Parliament for Effutu, assumed the role of Majority Leader as of Friday, February 23, according to the confirmation of the New Patriotic Party's National Council. This shift in the leadership of the Majority Front Bench is in line with the Speaker's recent decision regarding the selection process and comes after a recent interpretation of parliamentary procedure.

At a meeting chaired by the General Secretary of the NPP, Justin Kodua Frimpong, on Friday, 23 February 2024, confirmed that the change in leadership in the Parliament of Ghana has the full support of the New Patriotic Party (NPP).

== Projects/Initiatives ==
=== One Teacher, One Laptop ===
The One Teacher, One Laptop initiative was launched on 13 October 2018, during the donation of 100 laptops to teachers within the Effutuman at the Ebenezer Methodist Church in Winneba.

In January 2021, 40 newly posted teachers received laptops to enhance teaching and learning. Through this initiative, about 1000 laptops have been donated to teachers of both private and public schools in the constituency.

=== The Effutu Dream ===
The Effutu Dream was initiated in February 2023 to promote the Effutuman culture, which will create a sense of belonging among the youth in its constituency. This also focused on capacity building of its constituents. The dream aimed at branding Effutu Constituency to attract tourists and investors.

This initiative was birthed at a conference under the theme "Actualising the Effutu Dream: The Role of Effutu Youth".

==== 14 Libraries Project ====
As part of delivering quality education in the constituency, 14 libraries have been constructed to enable a reading culture among young people. A total of 14 libraries have been constructed under this initiative.

==== Royal Palm Tree Project ====
On 7 March 2020, Afenyo-Markin planted Royal Palm trees in the Winneba capital.

== Personal life ==
Afenyo-Markin is married to Dianne Markin. He plays table tennis and golf. He is a Freemason. He is of the Ewe tribe from the Volta Region of Ghana and is a committed Catholic.

== Viewpoint and Controversies ==
In May 2026, Afenyo-Markin faced public criticism from the Ghana Bar Association (GBA) following comments he made about a Circuit Court judge presiding over a case involving NPP Bono Regional Chairman Kwame Baffoe (popularly known as Abronye DC). During a press briefing, he criticised the judge’s handling of the case, including decisions relating to bail, and questioned the judge’s competence and impartiality.

The GBA subsequently issued a statement describing the remarks as “unethical,” “unprofessional,” and “unbecoming” of a senior lawyer and political leader. The Association argued that concerns about judicial decisions should be pursued through established legal processes such as appeals rather than public criticism of judges.

He stated tribunals bill could return Ghana to ''tsoo boi, let the blood flow justice'' and cautioned against establishing a tribunal system that could avoid due process.
