= Henry Anthony Kwofie =

Ghanaian judge

Justice Henry Anthony Kwofie

Justice of the Supreme Court of Ghana
- Incumbent
- Assumed office 3 January 2024
- Nominated by: Nana Akufo-Addo

Justice of the Court of Appeal
- In office 28 January 2015 – 3 January 2024
- Nominated by: John Mahama

Justice of the High Court
- In office 14 May 2004 – 28 January 2015
- Nominated by: John Kufuor

Personal details
- Born: May 12, 1960 (age 65) Ghana
- Education: Half Assini Senior High School; Navrongo Senior High School
- Alma mater: University of Ghana; Ghana School of Law
- Profession: Judge

Henry Anthony Kwofie is a Ghanaian judge, an active justice of the Supreme Court of Ghana and president of the Association of Magistrates and Justices of Ghana.

== Early life and education ==
Kwofie was born on 12 May 1960. He hails from Ainyinase, in the Ellembele District of the Western Region. He had his early education at the Bibiani Catholic Boys' primary school at Bibiani in the Western North Region of Ghana and the Methodist Middle School in Ainyisane in the Ellembele District of the Western Region. He proceeded to Half Assini Senior High School where he obtained his Ordinary Level certificate (O-Level) and continued at Navrongo Senior High School, where he obtained his Advanced Level certificate (A-Level). He had his tertiary education at the University of Ghana, Legon where he studied law for his Bachelor of Laws degree and proceeded to the Ghana School of Law, where he was awarded his Barrister-at-Law certificate. Kwofie was consequently called the bar on 3 October 1986.

== Career ==
Following his education at the University of Ghana, Kwofie taught at Nungua Senior High School from October 1984 until September 1986. In February 1988, he entered private practice as an Associate Solicitor and Barrister at the Adansiman Chambers and Co. Legal Practitioners in Kumasi, and after ten years of working in that capacity, Kwofie joined the Office of Revenue Commissioners in Kumasi, where he worked as a Legal Officer and Revenue Commissioner. In November 1993, Kwofie was appointed Regional Director and Senior Legal Officer at the Commission of Human Rights and Administrative Justice. In October 1997 he was sent to Cape Coast, Central Region to work in the same capacity until August 1998, when he joined the Judicial Service of Ghana following his appointment as Circuit Judge. He was first stationed in Tepa, and after two years, he was transferred to Takoradi. On 14 March 2004, Kwofie was appointed Justice of the High Court of Ghana, and in 2005, he served as a Commercial Court judge in Accra. He served in this capacity until October 2010, when he was transferred to Koforidua to serve on the High Court bench in Koforidua. In January 2015, he was appointed Justice of the Appeal Court of Ghana. In 2016 Kwofie served on the article 146 Committee for the Impeachment of Justice Ringo Cass Azumah and in 2017, he served on the 146 Committees for the Impeachment Justice Charles Quist and Justice Ayisi Addo. On 29 September 2021 he became president of the Association of Magistrates and Justices of Ghana.

== Supreme Court appointment ==
=== Nomination ===
In July 2023, the president of Ghana, Nana Akufo-Addo was advised by the Judicial Council in consultation with the Council of State under article 144(2) of the constitution of Ghana to nominate Kwofie together with two other judges (Justice Yaw Darko Asare and Justice Richard Adjei-Frimpong) for the position of the Justice of the Supreme Court of Ghana. These nominated judges were to replace former Chief Justice, Justice Kwasi Anin-Yeboah, Justice Nene Abayateye Ofoe Amegatcher and Justice Jones Victor Mawulorm Dotse who had attained the ages for their mandatory retirement. A letter to that effect was sent to the Parliament of Ghana in November 2023 which was then referred to the Appointments Committee of Parliament for consideration and vetting of the nominees.

=== Vetting and approval ===
Kwofie was subsequently vetted on 20 December 2023 by Parliament. During the vetting process, Kwofie discussed a number of topics concerning the judiciary in Ghana. On the number of Supreme Court judges on the bench of the Supreme Court of Ghana, he defended against accusations of court packing, asserting that the current workload justifies the need for more justices. During his vetting by the Appointment Committee of Parliament, Kwofie emphasised that the 12 existing justices are spread across only two panels, and the additional three positions are necessary to address the workload.

Kwofie also argued that while the Constitution sets a minimum of nine Supreme Court judges, it does not specify a maximum limit. He countered comparisons to the United States, explaining that Ghana's 16 justices accommodate the high volume of cases resulting from the country's open-door policy in the judicial system.

Addressing concerns about unanimous verdicts in favour of the government, referred to as "unanimous FC," Kwofie dismissed them as perceptions, emphasising the difficulty of dealing with public perceptions.

On the issue of the need for the codification of contempt of court, Kwofie expressed the view that the country does not require a law on contempt similar to the United Kingdom. During his vetting by Parliament's Appointments Committee, he highlighted the infrequency of contempt cases brought before the courts nationwide, particularly the limited instances involving the media. Kwofie suggested that the perceived issue of contempt often revolves around media coverage and urged citizens to exercise emotional control, acknowledging that judges are also human beings. His stance contrasted with a query from Francis Xavier Sosu, an MP, regarding the necessity of a contempt Act to regulate the courts' discretion in holding individuals in contempt of court. Kwofie emphasised the rarity of contempt convictions during his years as a judge, supporting his belief that the country does not need specific legislation on contempt.

Regarding the discourse on artificial and contemporary approaches to adjudication, Kwofie assured Parliament's Appointment Committee that the judiciary is well-equipped to address challenges posed by Artificial Intelligence (AI) and emerging technologies in future prosecutions. During the committee hearing on December 20, 2023, Justice Kwofie highlighted the introduction of the E-Justice programme as a proactive measure to tackle technological concerns. Responding to a query about the 2023 WASSCE, where results were withheld due to AI-generated answers, he emphasised the judiciary's commitment to adapt to evolving laws and societal changes.

Concerning the perception of corruption in the judiciary, Kwofie asserted that the majority of Ghanaian judges are not corrupt, contrary to some public claims. He emphasised that many allegations against judges are often unfounded perceptions, and those proven to be involved in corruption have been appropriately dealt with under Ghanaian law. Kwofie also suggested the need for a restructuring of the judiciary's communication department to enhance public understanding of court proceedings nationwide.

Kwofie further maintained that there are no political judges. He emphasised the danger of labelling judges as political and stressed the importance of judges acting in accordance with their conscience and oath. In response to a question about the existence of political judges, he firmly stated that such judges do not exist, and consequently, there cannot be political judgements if judges uphold their commitment to impartiality.

He was subsequently approved by Parliament on 23 December 2023. Mr. Joseph Osei-Owusu, the First Deputy Speaker and Chairman of the Appointments Committee of Parliament, reported that, based on constitutional provisions and standing orders, the committee found Kwofie and the two other nominees qualified as Justices of the Supreme Court. Emphasising his demonstrated knowledge and expertise in the law, Osei-Owusu recommended, by consensus, the adoption of the committee's report for appointment approval. Mr. Governs Kwame Agbodza, the Minority Chief Whip, expressed satisfaction with the judges' approval, highlighting their competence and optimism for improvements in the justice delivery system.

=== Swearing-in ===
Kwofie was sworn into office together with the two other nominees by President Akufo-Addo on 3 January 2024. Concerning his swearing in, the president underscored the importance of their judgements in contributing to the nation's orderly development.

President Akufo-Addo administered the Oath of Allegiance, Judicial Oath, and Oath of Secrecy to him, presenting him with Warrants of Appointment. The ceremony included the Chief Justice, Justice Gertrude Araba Esaaba Sackey Torkornoo, members of the Judicial Council, and other dignitaries. The President urged him and the two other nominees to interpret the constitution with a broad and liberal spirit, considering it as a living organism capable of growth and development.

Kwofie, speaking on behalf of his colleagues, expressed gratitude for the screening, appointments, vetting, and swearing-in processes. He assured that he and his colleagues would fulfil their duties without fear or favour, acknowledging the significance of their role in the nation's development.

== Personal life ==
Kwofie is married with four children. He is a Christian and a member of the Methodist Church of Ghana. He is able to read, write and speak in English, Nzema, Twi and Fante. His hobbies include listening to Jazz music, reading and walking.
