= Adams Ebenezer Mahama =

Ghanaian politician

Hon. Adams Ebenezer Mahama

Member of Parliament for Mion Constituency
- In office 7 January 2001 – 6 January 2005
- President: John Kufuor

Personal details
- Born: Sang
- Died: Tamale
- Party: National Democratic Congress
- Education: Ghana Secondary School ( Ghanasco)
- Profession: Politician/Accountant

Adams Ebenezer Mahama is a Ghanaian politician and was the member of parliament for the Mion constituency in the Northern region of Ghana. He was a member of parliament in the 3rd parliament of the 4th republic of Ghana.He died on 10 August 2013

== Politics ==
Mahama is a member of the National Democratic Congress. He was elected as the member of parliament for the Mion constituency in the Northern region in the 3rd parliament of the 4th republic of Ghana. He was succeeded by Ahmed Alhassan Yakubu in the 2004 Ghanaian General elections.

Mahama was elected as the member of parliament for the Mion constituency in the 2000 Ghanaian general elections. He was elected on the ticket of the National Democratic Congress. His constituency was a part of the 18 parliamentary seats out of 23 seats won by the National Democratic Congress in that election for the Northern Region. The National Democratic Congress won a minority total of 92 parliamentary seats out of 200 seats in the 3rd parliament of the 4th republic of Ghana. He was elected with 6,125 votes out of 20,706 total valid votes cast. This was equivalent to 31.8% of the total valid votes cast. He was elected over Alabira Ibrahim of the Convention People's Party, Iddisah K. Jacob of the People's National Convention, Prince A. Baako of the New Patriotic Party, Emmanuel B. Lag an independent candidate and Stephen O. Yacham of the National Reform Party. These obtained 5,578, 3,055, 2,964, 969 and 559 votes respectively out of the total valid votes cast. These were equivalent to 29.0%, 15.9%, 15.4%, 5.0and 2.9% respectively of total valid votes cast.
