= Opam =

Opam or OPAM may refer to:

== Opam ==
- Emmanuel Opam-Brown Akolbire (born 1960), Ghanaian politician and member of Ghanaian Parliament

== OPAM ==
- OCaml Package Manager, for the Caml programming language implementation
- Ōita Prefectural Art Museum (OpAm), an art museum and community exhibition venue in Japan
- OPAM, a sculpture park by Lucien den Arend
