= Edward Aliedong Alhassan =

Ghanaian politician

Hon. Edward Aliedong Alhassan
- In office 7 January 1993 – 6 January 1997
- President: Jerry John Rawlings
- Succeeded by: Adam Mahama

MP for Damango Daboya

Personal details
- Born: 15 April 1940 (age 86)
- Party: National Democratic Congress
- Education: Damongo Middle Boarding School
- Occupation: Farmer

Hon. Edward Aliedong Alhassan (born 15 April 1940) was a member of 1st Parliament of the 4th Republic of Ghana for Damango-Daboya from 7 January 1993 to 6 January 1997. He was elected on the ticket of the National Democratic Congress in the 1992 Ghanaian general election.

== Early life and education ==
Edward Aliedong Alhassan was born on 15 April 1940. He had his education at Damongo Middle Boarding School and Govt. Secondary School. He graduated from the Tamale Senior High School. He obtained a diploma in Statistics.

== Career ==
Aliedong Alhassan is a farmer and a former member of Parliament for the Damango-Daboya constituency in the Northern Region of Ghana.

== Politics ==
Edward Aliedong Alhassan is a member of the National Democratic Congress. In 1992, he contested to represent the people of Damango and Daboya in the 1st parliament of the 4th Republic of Ghana. He was elected on the ticket of the National Democratic Congress and won the parliamentary seat with Eight Thousand Three Hundred and Fifty-Six votes which correspond to 35.80%. On 7 January 1997, he was succeeded by Hon. Adam Mahama, who became a member of the 2nd Parliament of the 4th Republic of Ghana after winning the parliamentary seat in the 1996 Ghanaian general election.

== Personal life ==
He is Muslim.
