= Mohammed Abdul Aziz =

Ghanaian politician

Mohammed Abdul Aziz is a Ghanaian politician who was the Member of Parliament for Mion constituency in the Northern Region of Ghana which he won in the 2016 Ghanaian parliamentary election.

== Politics ==
Aziz is a member of National Democratic Congress and was the member of parliament for Mion constituency in the seventh parliament of the fourth republic of Ghana.

Aziz contested the 2016 Ghanaian general election on the ticket of National Democratic Congress for Mion constituency in the Northern Region and won the election with 15, 954 votes representing 58.48% of the total votes. He won the parliamentary seat over Mohammed Hashim Abdallah of New Patriotic Party who polled 10, 127 votes representing 37.12%, parliamentary candidate for convention people's party Mbayun Philemon N-naye had 1,122 which is equivalent to 4.11% and parliamentary candidate for PNC Sayibu Abdul-Rauf polled 80 votes representing 0.29% of the total votes.

Aziz contested again in the 2020 Ghanaian general election on the ticket of National Democratic Congress but lost the election to Abdul-Aziz Ayaba Musah of New Patriotic Party.
