= Johnson Kwaku Adu =

Ghanaian politician

Hon. Johnson Kwaku Adu
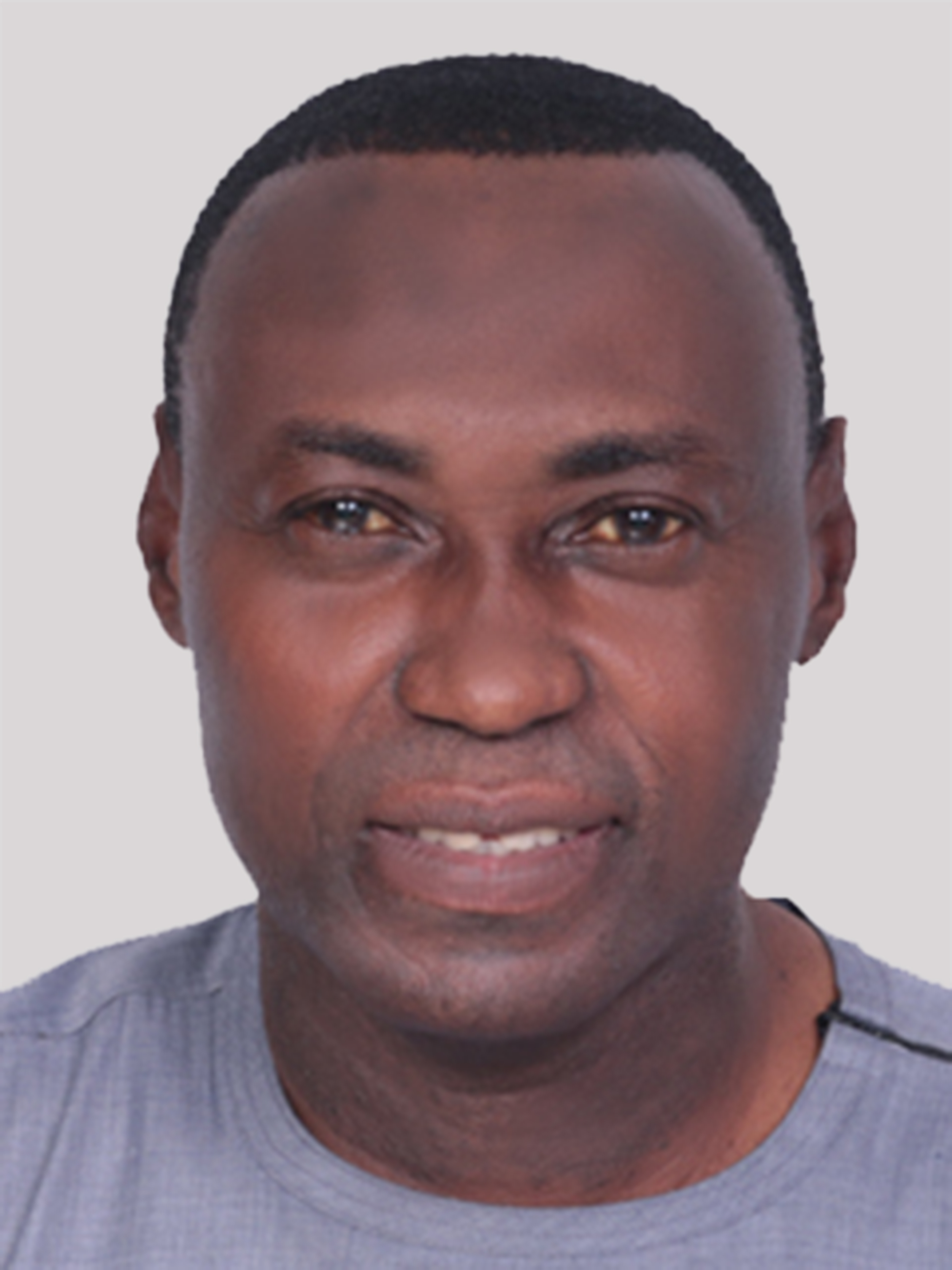

Member of Parliament for Ahafo Ano South West Constituency
- In office 7 January 2021 – 6 January 2025
- Succeeded by: Elvis Osei Mensah Dapaah

Personal details
- Born: Johnson Kwaku Adu; 10 August 1969 (age 56) Akrokerri, Ghana
- Party: New Patriotic Party
- Occupation: Politician
- Committees: Youth, Sports and Culture Committee, Health Committee

Johnson Kwaku Adu (born 10 August 1969) is a Ghanaian politician and member of the Seventh Parliament of the Fourth Republic of Ghana and the 8th Parliament of the Fourth Republic of Ghana. He represented the Ahafo Ano South West Constituency in the Ashanti Region on the ticket of the New Patriotic Party.

== Early life and education ==
Adu was born on 10 August 1969 in Akrokerri in the Ashanti Region. He had his Diploma in Chemistry/Biology in 2000. He earned his BEd (Science) at University of Education, Winneba in 2001.

== Personal life ==
Adu is a Christian and fellowships at Church of Pentecost. He is married with two children.

== Career ==
Adu was a NADMO District Coordinator for Ahafo Ano South District from 2002 to 2009, and Ghana Education Service (Circuit Supervisor) Ahafo Ano District Office from 2010 to 2012. He was also a Science tutor at Akrokeri College of Education.

== Political life ==
Adu is a member of NPP. He was a majority member of the 6th parliament of the 4th republic of Ghana. He was the Presiding Member of Ahafo Ano South District Assembly, Mankraso, from April 2009 to January 2011; and MP from January 2013 to date; it is his second term.

He contested in the 2020 Ghanaian general election on the ticket of the New Patriotic Party and won to represent in the 8th Parliament of the Fourth Republic of Ghana. He won with 15,761 votes making 54.51% of the total votes whiles the NDC parliamentary candidate Sadik Abubakar had 13,153 votes making 45.49% of the total votes and an Independent candidate Adom Douglas Kwakye had 11,052 votes.

In 2021, Adu together with Alexander Kwamena Afenyo-Markin, Abdul-Aziz Ayaba Musah, Laadi Ayii Ayamba and Emmanuel Kwasi Bedzrah were sworn in during the Extraordinary Session 2021 of the Parliament of the ECOWAS which happened in Freetown in Sierra Leone.

=== Committees ===
Adu is the Chairperson of the Youth, Sports and Culture Committee and a member of the Health Committee.

== Controversy ==
In April 2017, the British High Commission in Ghana allegedly accused Adu, George Boakye, Richard Acheampong, and Joseph Benhazin Dahah of helping their relatives enter the UK illegally using their diplomatic passports. Adu traveled to London with his spouse and daughter and was suspected to have left them behind in Britain.
