= Navrongo Senior High School =

- Navrongo, Upper East Region; Ghana

Information
- Former names: President's College; Navrongo School
- Motto: Lux Borealis (The Light of the North)
- Established: September 1960
- Founder: Kwame Nkrumah
- School district: Kassena-Nankana District
- Headmistress: Mercy Babachewe
- Head teacher: Mercy Babachewe
- Gender: co-educational

Navrongo Senior High School is a school in Navrongo which was established in September 1960 by Ghana's first president Osagyefo Dr. Kwame Nkrumah. It was named President's College. The president indicated his dream that this school will become a great centre of learning in the north and that he will watch its progress with keen interest. Later, it was simply called Navrongo School (NAVASCO). Its mascot is the horn, an important northern Ghanaian symbol of royalty, bravery, and leadership. The school's motto is "LUX BOREALIS" in Latin. It means "The Light of the North". Old students are known as NABIA, a local word meaning Citizen.

== Facilities ==
NAVASCO is one of few schools in northern Ghana with a wealth of physical infrastructure, a major reason for its ability to educate many people. It is the Upper East's oldest and arguably most prestigious public secondary school and among about six elite schools in northern Ghana. In the 1970s, it became known for its agricultural activities under Mr. MacDonald, a veteran British educator. The school has a dam for irrigation farming and an orchard some few metres from the chapel. The school is blessed with hectares of farmlands used for farming by teaching and non-teaching members of staff. There is the Kasadjan Sports Stadium for recreation. The famous MacDonald Hall serves assembly and entertainment purposes. The school library served the school and the community for years. The NAVASCO workshop also ensures that not much is bought from outside of school. Carpentry and metal works for all things on campus are carried out in this workshop. There were fourteen residential halls for students as of 2025. They are Kwegyir Aggrey, John F. Kennedy, Livingtone, Abatey, Ferguson, Garvey, Guggisberg, Nkrumah, Volta, and Abavana halls all for gentlemen. Slessor, Tono, Independence, and Luther King halls serve ladies. Recently, alumni and government completed a number of projects including storey block for classrooms, NAVASCO Clinic, and the Abavana ICT Centre.

== Academics ==
NAVASCO offers programmes in Agricultural Science, General Science, General Business, General Arts, Visual Arts and Home Economics. Students have numerous options to choose from in these general programmes. The campus offers a well-equipped Science Laboratory and a School Farm, both of which offer practical training to science students. The Debating Society is open to all students but is practically dominated by General Arts students who use it as a public speaking training ground; it has produced many of the notable politicians who have graduated from this school. Some great teachers taught at NAVASCO including the award-winning Maths teacher, Samuel Gaewu, and Ayi Kwei Armah, the famed novelist, who taught here in the mid-1960s.

== Students ==
NAVASCO is a highly selective school and remains a top choice for students both in the north and throughout the country. This is mainly attributable to the high academic standards, student culture and connections, pedigree, and discipline. Student enrollment has increased over the years. NAVASCO uses a unique numbering system called Folios. No two students have the same folio number. Old students identify themselves by their folio numbers. This folio system indicates who attended NAVASCO earlier due to the upward, progressive system of the numbering. The school has a strong old students presence in the UK, North America and East Asia.

== Leadership ==
The first headmaster was J.K Fiegbor. He was followed by Agyemang Dickson, Crawford, and then Mr. C.G MacDonald, probably the famous headmaster in the school's history. He used students to construct MacDonald Hall, the assembly place for students. Under him, the teaching of Mathematics so improved that it became a source of attraction for many talented students who wanted to better their Maths for progress into higher education. Mr. Adenze Kangah and Mr. Alosius Alexis Abem were also two well-known headmasters of the school in the 1980s before Madam Katumi assumed responsibility in the 1990s. She was instrumental in strengthening discipline and improving performance. Mr. Patrick Tangonyire took over in the 2000s. NAVASCO is today headed by Madam Mercy Babachuweh.

== Notable alumni ==
The school educated many of the north's elite. Others come from the southern parts of Ghana. Notable among its old students are

- Samson Lardy Anyenini
- Joseph Yieleh Chireh
- Hawa Yakubu
- Paul Afoko
- James Agalga
- Cletus Avoka
- John Ndebugre
- Gheysika Agambila
- Martin Amidu
- Haruna Iddrisu
- Ambrose Dery
- Issaku Salia
- Misbahu Mahama Adams
- Abdul-Rauf Tanko Ibrahim
- Adam Mahama
- Gaaga Akayeri Azitariga
- Henry Anthony Kwofie
- Gbiel Simon Suurbaareh
- Samuel Marful-Sau
- Michael Samson-Oje
- Henry Ford Kamel
- Roland Agambire
- Amin Alhassan
