= Samson Lardy Anyenini =

Ghanaian lawyer and journalist

- Education: Kwame Nkrumah University of Science and Technology; Ghana School of Law
- Occupations: Lawyer, journalist
- Known for: Newsfile
- Television: JoyNews
- Awards: GIJ Best Journalist 2019

Samson Lardy Anyenini is a Ghanaian legal practitioner and broadcast journalist with Multimedia Group Limited. In September 2020, he was crowned the 25th P.V. Ansah Journalist of the Year 2019 at the Ghana Journalists Association (GJA) Media Awards.

== Background ==
Samson Anyenini hails from humble beginnings in Gambibgo, Bolgatanga East District, Upper East Region. His parents, like many others, migrated to the Ashanti Region in search of better opportunities.

Anyenini's educational journey began at Navrongo Senior High School and continued at the University of Ghana, where he studied Philosophy and Classics. During his time there, he served as the Junior Common Room (JCR) President for Akuafo Hall.

After earning his Bachelor of Arts degree, Anyenini embarked on a media career, first with Luv FM in Kumasi and later with the BBC. In 2010, he qualified as a lawyer. He gained his LLM from University of Ghana and his LLB from the Kwame Nkrumah University of Science and Technology.

In 2013 he left his position as News Editor at the Multimedia Group to focus on legal practice. He now heads A-Partners @ Law, his own law firm. Anyenini maintains hosting the current affairs show, Newfile, on Joy FM and Joy News every Saturdays.

== Career ==
He was appointed to serve as the Chairman of the Ghana Football Association Normalization Disciplinary Committee . He was invited to join the illustrious Supreme Court Justices due to his sound knowledge of the law, and his interest in constitutional matters and legal advocacy. He has represented, assisted and advised numerous clients on legal matters including a delegation of a dozen MPs and leaders of Ghana's 6th Parliament, famous corporate entities such NTHC Properties Limited, Multimedia Group Limited and African Origin Travels. He also conducted the case that saw the removal from office of the head of the CHRAJ in 2015. Samson was previously with Osu-based Gaisie Zwennes Hughes & Co.

He holds a Master degree of Laws in Alternative Dispute Resolution, his practice focus on International Commercial and Investment Arbitration. He is an Associate of the Chartered Institute of Arbitrators. He has consulted for and delivered special papers for professional institutions and special organizations including the Judicial Service of Ghana and the local chapter of global watchdog Ghana Integrity Initiative and Ghana Anti-Corruption Coalition, Ghana Centre for Democratic Development. He was recently invited to serve on the Board of the International Lawyers Assisting Workers (ILAW) Network.

== Awards ==
Samson won GJA's P.V. Ansah Journalist of the Year 2019 Awards.
