= Issaku Salia =

Ghanaian politician

Issahaku Salia

Member of the Ghana Parliament for Wa East
- In office 7 January 1993 – 6 January 2005
- Preceded by: Sakara Adam Badoun
- Succeeded by: Godfrey Tangu Bayon

Personal details
- Born: 15 June 1952 (age 74) Manwe, Upper West Region
- Party: National Democratic Congress
- Education: Navrongo Senior High School
- Alma mater: University of Ghana; Ghana Institute of Management and Public Administration
- Occupation: Administrator and Politician

Issahaku Salia is a Ghanaian politician and administrator. He served as a member of parliament for the Wa East constituency in the Upper West from 7 January 1993 to 6 January 2005. He also once served as the Upper West Regional Minister.

== Early life and education ==
Issahaku Salia was born on 15 June 1952 in Manwe in the Upper West Region of Ghana. He attended the Green Hill University (now Ghana Institute of Management and Public Administration (GIMPA)), where he obtained his Diploma in Public Administration, and the University of Ghana where he obtained his bachelor of Science degree Political Science. Salia is still alive.

== Politics ==
He was a member of the 1st, 2nd and 3rd parliaments of the 4th republic of Ghana.

=== 1992 election ===
He was first elected into Parliament on the ticket of the National Democratic Congress to represent the Wa East Constituency in the Upper West Region of Ghana during the 1992 Ghanaian parliamentary election. He assumed office as a member of the first parliament of the fourth republic of Ghana on 7 January 1993.

=== 1996 election ===
He became a member of the 2nd parliament on 7 January 1997 after he was pronounced winner at the 1996 Ghanaian general election having defeated Boyela Insah of the New Patriotic Party. He obtained 56.70% of the total votes cast which is equivalent to 22,078 votes while his opposition claimed 16.60% which is equivalent to 6,445 votes.

=== 2000 election ===
He was elected into parliament of the ticket of the National Democratic congress during the 2000 Ghanaian General Election representing the Wa East constituency in the Upper West Region of Ghana.

He polled 14,278 votes out of 25,795 votes cast representing 55.40% He was defeated by Bayon Godfrey Tangu, a New Patriotic Party member during the 2004 General Elections.

He was introduced by the vice president on 1 August 2010 to the chiefs and people of the Region as the Upper West Regional minister.

== Career ==
Salia is a former member of parliament for the Wa East Constituency in the Upper West Region of Ghana. He is also an administrator.

== Personal life ==
Salia is a Muslim.
