= Presbyterian Senior High School, Osu =

Location
- P.O. Box M173, Accra; Osu - Accra, Ghana; Greater Accra Region; Accra, Ghana, Greater Accra Region, 23321; Ghana; 5.5549°N 0.1849°W

Information
- School type: Government funded, Day
- Motto: Virtute Omnia Inferiora
- Religious affiliation: Christianity
- Denomination: Presbyterian
- Established: 1956
- School district: Osu District
- Oversight: Ghana Education Service
- Staff: 93 teachers
- Grades: Forms' (1–3)
- Gender: Mixed
- Age range: 14-18
- Enrollment: c. 500
- Average class size: 50
- Language: English
- Campus: Osu
- Houses: 4
- Colours: white and blue
- Athletics: Track and Field
- Sports: Hockey, Soccer, Basketball
- Nickname: OPRE
- Affiliation: Presbyterian Church of Ghana
- Alumni: Osu Presec Old Students Association (OPOSA)
- Address: P.O. Box M173,Accra, Ghana
- Website: www.presecosu.com

The Presbyterian Secondary School, Osu also known as Osu PRESEC is a public secondary school in Accra.

== History ==
The school was established in 1956 in one of the Old Basel Missionary buildings at the foot of Kuku Hill of Osu. The school was established to offer presbyterian day secondary education to children in Osu whose parents could not afford the boarding fees at Presbyterian Boys Senior Secondary school and to have a secondary school at Osu, in compensation for lack of a boarding school. The church and some individual educators teamed up to establish the school, with Cleland Armah as the first Headmaster.

In 1963, the school was absorbed into the public system under a new headmaster, Mr. McCarthy. He renovated the Old Basel Mission building into a school building accommodating two streams of classrooms, a library, an administration office and science laboratories. The church offered the present site, known as the "New Site". At the moment, the school has a block with eighteen classrooms and a three storey science block accommodating the staff. Currently, the school has benefited from the GETFund and new classroom blocks are being put up to accommodate the students.

== Courses Offered ==
1. Business
2. Home economics
3. Visual Art
4. General Art
5. General Science

== Head Teachers ==
Name	Position	Tenure In Office
Barbara Buerkie Puplampu	Headmistress	2014 - 2019
Diana Dennis Oye Welbeck	Headmistress	2011 - 2014

== Achievements ==
=== 2018 Sprite Ball Champions ===
The Presbyterian High School-Osu won over Mfantsipim School to win the Sprite Ball Championship for the first time, after beating Mfantsipim 25-22.

Point guard Joel Kobayere was named the most valuable player of the tournament. Presec-Osu won the championship in their second appearance at the tournament.

2016 All-Accra Presec Schools Science and Maths Quiz

In 2016, Presbyterian Senior High School, Osu won the All-Accra Presec Schools Science and Maths Quiz, an academic competition involving Presbyterian Senior High Schools in the Greater Accra Region.

The competition brought together teams from PRESEC-Legon, PRESEC-Osu, PRESEC-Teshie, PRESEC-Tema and PRESEC-La. The participating schools competed in questions science and mathematics, with teams required to demonstrate accuracy, speed and teamwork.

PRESEC-Osu emerged as the overall winner after a competitive contest, securing the title ahead of the other participating PRESEC schools. The victory was regarded as one of the school’s notable academic achievements and contributed to its reputation for academic excellence.

The competition was distinct from the National Science and Maths Quiz (NSMQ), which is Ghana’s nationwide inter-schools science and mathematics competition.

== Notable alumni ==
- Uncle Ebo Whyte - Theatre Arts Producer

== See also ==
- PeaceJam Ghana
