= PeaceJam Ghana =

Annual conference in Ghana

PeaceJam Ghana is a youth leadership programme and annual conference in Ghana associated with the PeaceJam Foundation. The programme works with students from junior high and senior high schools through educational activities, mentoring, and youth led service projects focused on peace, social responsibility, leadership, and sustainable development.

== History ==
PeaceJam Ghana started in 2008 by its official chapter, the West Africa Center for Peace Foundation, Ghana (WACPF). PeaceJam Ghana has mentored and trained over 5000 students since its inception. PeaceJam Ghana has produced many scholars, some of whom have received the TPG Global Impact Youth Fellows scholarship to pursue higher degrees.

Wisdom Addo is the Founder and executive director of the West Africa Center for Peace Foundation, Ghana.

== Partner schools ==
- Osu Presby Senior High School
- Kaneshie Senior High Technical School- Accra
- Kraboa Coaltar Presby Senior High Technical School
- Half Assini Senior High School
- Annor Adjaye Senior High School
- Accra High Senior High School – Accra
- St Mary's Senior High School (Ghana)
- St. Stephen's R/C
- Prince of Peace
- Star of The Sea R/C
- Mataheko R/C -1936
- St. Kizito
- Bennett Caulley
