= Charles Bawaduah =

Ghanaian lawyer and politician

Hon. Charles Adongo Bawaduah

Member of Parliament for Bongo Constituency
- Incumbent
- Assumed office January 2025

Personal details
- Born: May 5, 1975 (age 51) Bongo‑Beo, Upper East Region, Ghana
- Party: National Democratic Congress
- Profession: Lawyer, Politician

Charles Bawaduah (born 5 May 1975) is a Ghanaian lawyer and politician. He has represented the Bongo Constituency in the Upper East Region as the member of Parliament since being elected in the 2024 general election.

== Early life and education ==
Bawaduah was born in Bongo‑Beo in the Upper East Region. He earned his secondary education (SSCE) at Notre Dame in December 1993, followed by a Bachelor of Arts in Law from the University of Ghana in June 1999. He completed professional legal training at the Ghana School of Law in June 2001.

== Career ==
Bawaduah began his legal career as a legal officer during his national service with the Commission on Human Rights and Administrative Justice (CHRAJ), later working in industrial relations roles at the Trade Union Congress. He later became executive secretary of the National Labour Commission and also practiced law with the Law Alert Group.

He entered politics with the National Democratic Congress (NDC), contesting the party's parliamentary primaries for the Bongo Constituency in 2011 and 2015. In 2023, he secured the nomination after defeating incumbent MP Edward Abambire Bawa. In the December 2024 general election, Bawaduah was elected as member of Parliament for Bongo with 30,114 votes (75.96%), defeating the New Patriotic Party (NPP) candidate.

In Parliament, Bawaduah serves as a member of the Sanitation and Water Resources Committee, and as vice chairperson of the Private Member's Bill and Private Member’s Motion Committee. He is also a member of the Special Committee (Winnowing).

== See also ==
- Bongo (Ghana parliament constituency)
- Parliament of Ghana
