= Pusiga (Ghana parliament constituency) =

Constituency in Ghana

- constituency for the Parliament of Ghana
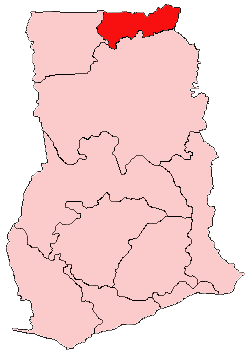
- District: Bawku Municipal District
- Region: Upper East Region of Ghana

Current constituency
- Created: 2004
- Party: National Democratic Congress
- MP: Laadi Ayii Ayamba

Pusiga is one of the constituencies represented in the Parliament of Ghana. It elects one Member of Parliament (MP) by the first past the post system of election. Pusiga is located in the Pusiga district of the Upper East Region of Ghana. Pusiga is part of the northern part of Ghana.

There was a Pusiga constituency during the First Republic. This became defunct following the military coup in 1966 which banned parliament. The Pusiga constituency was not existent in subsequent parliaments until its recreation in 2004 prior to the 2004 general election.

== Boundaries ==
The seat is located within the Pusiga district in the Upper East Region of Ghana.

== History ==
This is one of the new constituencies created by the Electoral Commission of Ghana prior to the Ghanaian parliamentary and presidential elections in 2004.

== Members of Parliament ==
| First elected | Member | Party |
First Republic
| 1965 | Cecelia Bukari-Yakubu | Convention People's Party |
Fourth Republic - Pusiga recreated
| 2004 | Simon Atingban Akunye | National Democratic Congress |
| 2012 | Laadi Ayii Ayamba | National Democratic Congress |

== Elections ==
The 2020 general election was won by a very thin margin of only 63 votes by the incumbent MP.

2020 Ghanaian general election: Pusiga
| Party | Candidate | Votes | % | ±% |
|---|---|---|---|---|
| National Democratic Congress | Laadi Ayii Ayamba | 14,929 | 42.3 | — |
| New Patriotic Party | Abdul-Karim Zanni Dubiure | 14,866 | 42.1 | — |
| Independent | Simon Akunye Atingban | 5,069 | 14.4 | — |
| All People's Congress | Moses Azuma Musa | 391 | 2.3 | |
| People's National Convention | John Aguri Akugri | 138 | 0.4 | |
| Majority | | 63 | 0.2 | — |
| Turnout | | 35,285 | | — |
| Registered electors | | 46,311 | | — |

2008 Ghanaian general election: Pusiga Source:Ghana Home Page
| Party | Candidate | Votes | % | ±% |
|---|---|---|---|---|
| National Democratic Congress | Simon Atingban Akunye | 8,803 | 52.8 | |
| New Patriotic Party | Mohammed Imoro Asoko | 6,021 | 36.1 | |
| Convention People's Party | Abugbila Daniel | 1,469 | 8.8 | |
| People's National Convention | Azongo Peter Tasiri | 391 | 2.3 | |
| Majority | | | | |
| Turnout | | | | — |
| Registered electors | | | | — |

== See also ==
- List of Ghana Parliament constituencies
