= Abdul-Aziz Ayaba Musah =

Ghanaian politician

Hon. Abdul-Aziz Ayaba Musah
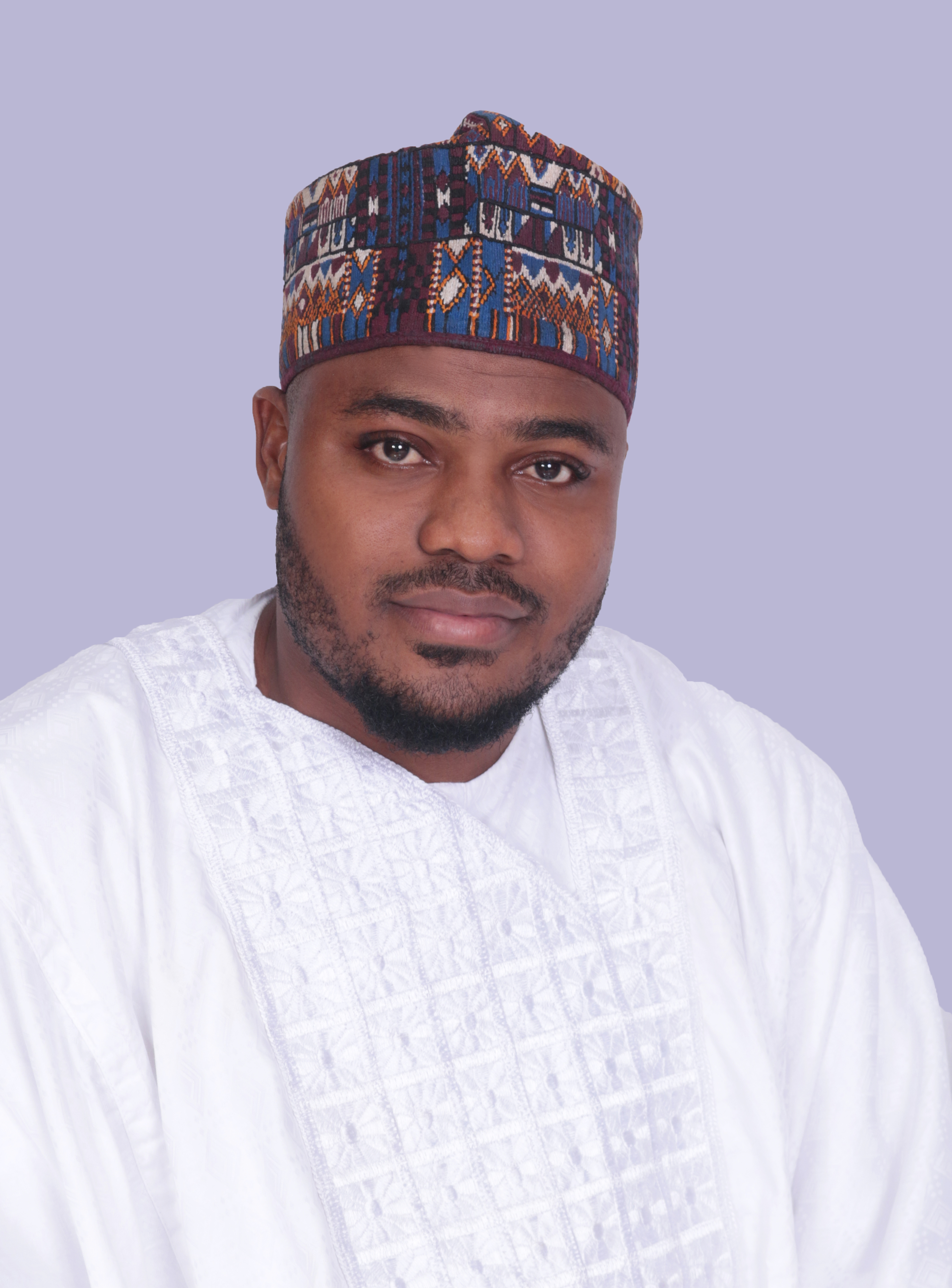

Member of Parliament for Mion Constituency
- Incumbent
- Assumed office 7 January 2021
- Preceded by: Mohammed Abdul Aziz

Personal details
- Born: 1 January 1986 (age 40) Sang, Ghana
- Party: New Patriotic Party
- Occupation: Politician
- Committees: Employment, Social Welfare and State Enterprises Committee, Special Budget Committee

Abdul-Aziz Ayaba Musah (born 1 January 1986) is a Ghanaian politician and a member of parliament for the Mion constituency in the Northern Region. He was elected during the 2020 presidential and parliamentary elections, becoming the first MP to win on the ticket of the New Patriotic Party with total votes count of 21552 (59.07%). In the 2024 general election in Ghana, Abdul-Aziz Ayaba Musah lost his seat to Misbahu Mahama Adams.

== Early life and education ==
He was born on January 1, 1986, and hails from Sang in the Northern Region of Ghana. He attended Yendi Senior High School and obtained his Senior Secondary Certificate Examination (SSSCE) in 2005. In his for further education, he proceeded to the University for Development Studied (UDS), where he obtained Bachelor of Arts (B.A) in Economics and Entrepreneurship in 2010. In 2017, he had his Post graduate certificate in Public Administration from the Ghana Institute of Management and Public Administration.

== Career ==
He was a national service personnel at the National Health Insurance Authority and later the administrator for the Local Government Service. He is the General Manager for Alhaj Musah Enterprise.

=== Political career ===
He is a member of NPP and currently the MP for Mion Constituency. He won the seat with 21,552 votes whilst Mohammed Abdul Aziz of the NDC had 14,158 votes. The capture of the seat by Abdul Aziz made history because it was the first time the NPP won the Mion Constituency in 28 years.

In 2021, Abdul-Aziz together with Alexander Kwamena Afenyo-Markin, Johnson Kwaku Adu, Laadi Ayii Ayamba and Emmanuel Kwasi Bedzrah were sworn in during the Extraordinary Session 2021 of the Parliament of the ECOWAS which happened in Freetown in Sierra Leone. In February 2024, Abdul Aziz was nominated by Nana AKufo-Addo for consideration by parliament as Deputy Minister for Fisheries and Aqua Culture. Parliament's Appointment Committee vetted and approved him and in May 2024, he was sworn into office.

=== Committees ===
In Parliament, he has served on various committees including the Special Budget and Employment, Social Welfare and State Enterprises Committees. He is currently a member of the Local Government and Rural Development Committee.

In March 2023, Abdul Aziz received the People's MP of the Year Award at the Northern Excellence Awards.

== Personal life ==
Abdul-Aziz Ayaba Musah is a Muslim. He is married with 3 children.

== Philanthropy ==
In 2020, he donated a motorcycle to the Chief of Jagrido in the Northern Region of Ghana. In 2022, as the Member of Parliament for the area, he commissioned two boreholes to two communities in the Mion District, namely, Sakpe and Tijo.

Again, in 2021 he donated school uniforms to the Bourido Primary School students in his constituency. The School's headmaster together with the Parents Teachers Association (PTA) received the uniforms numbering to 130.
