= Ahafo Ano South West (Ghana parliament constituency) =

Constituency in the Ashanti Region of Ghana

- constituency for the Parliament of Ghana
- District: Ahafo Ano South District
- Region: Ashanti Region of Ghana

Current constituency
- Created: 2016
- Party: New Patriotic Party
- MP: Elvis Osei Mensah Dapaah

Ahafo Ano South West is one of the constituencies represented in the Parliament of Ghana. It elects one Member of Parliament (MP) by the first past the post system of election. Elvis Osei Mensah Dapaa is the member of parliament for the constituency. Ahafo Ano South West is located in the Ahafo Ano South district of the Ashanti Region of Ghana.

== Boundaries ==
The seat is located within the Ahafo Ano South District of the Ashanti Region of Ghana.

== Members of Parliament ==
Election	Member	Party	Ref
2016	Johnson Kwaku Adu	New Patriotic Party	

== Elections ==
2016 Ghanaian parliamentary election: Ahafo Ano South West Source: [ ]
Party	Candidate	Votes	%	±%
New Patriotic Party	Johnson Kwaku Adu	14,949	57.33	
National Democratic Congress	Joseph Donkor	10,174	39.02	
Progressive People's Party	Paul Agyemang-Bioh	628	2.41	
United Front Party	Philemon Oppong	212	0.81	
Convention People's Party	Sarfo Adam	112	0.43	
Majority		4,775	18.31	

== See also ==
- List of Ghana Parliament constituencies
