= Elvis Osei Mensah Dapaah =

Ghanaian politician

Hon. Elvis Osei Mensah Dapaah MP

Member of Parliament for Ahafo Ano South West
- Incumbent
- Assumed office 7 January 2025
- Preceded by: Johnson Kwaku Adu
- President: John Mahama
- Vice President: Jane Naana Opoku-Agyemang

Personal details
- Born: 8 May 1992 (age 33) Abesewa
- Party: New Patriotic Party
- Occupation: Politician
- Committees: Local Government and Rural Development; Chieftaincy, Culture and Religious Affairs; Human Rights

Elvis Osei Mensah Dapaah (born May 8, 1992) is a Ghanaian politician and Member of Parliament for the Ahafo Ano South West constituency in the Ashanti Region. He represents the New Patriotic Party (NPP) in the Ninth Parliament of the Fourth Republic of Ghana.

== Early life and education ==
Dapaah hails from Kunsu in the Ahafo Ano South West District, Ashanti Region. He holds a BSc in Agriculture from the Kwame Nkrumah University of Science and Technology.

== Politics ==
Dapaah contested and won the Ahafo Ano South West seat in the December 7, 2024 general election, representing the New Patriotic Party (NPP). His victory was confirmed after a High Court-mandated re-collation on December 21, 2024, receiving 16,680 votes against National Democratic Congress’s Sedik Abubakar with 16,540 votes, a margin of 140.

He was sworn into office in January 2025 and serves on the Local Government & Rural Development Committee, the Chieftaincy, Culture & Religious Affairs Committee (as Vice Chair), and the Human Rights Committee in Parliament
