= Simon Alangde Asabo =

Ghanaian politician

Member of parliament for Bongo Constituency
- In office 7 January 1997 – 6 January 2001
- President: John Jerry Rawlings

Personal details
- Born: Bongo, Upper East Region Ghana)
- Party: National Democratic Congress
- Occupation: Politician

Simon Alangde Asabo is a Ghanaian politician and was the former member of parliament for the Bongo constituency in the Upper East region of Ghana in the second parliament of the 4th republic of Ghana.

== Early life ==
Asabo was born at Bongo in the Upper East Region of Ghana.

== Career ==
Alangde is an accountant by profession.

== Politics ==
Alangde was elected to represent the Bongo constituency in the 2nd parliament of the 4th republic of Ghana in the 1996 Ghanaian general elections. He was elected on the ticket of the National Democratic Congress. He took over from Gaaga Akayeri Azitariga also of the National Democratic Congress who represented the constituency in the first parliament of the 4th republic of Ghana. Alangde lost his seat to Albert Abongo in the subsequent elections of 2000.

== Elections ==
Alangde was elected with 22695 votes out of 30750 valid votes cast representing 73.8% of the total valid votes cast. He was elected over Emmanuel Akobire Adosenaba of the People's Convention party, Ayamga Joseph Leo of the National Convention Party and John Adobongo Atanga of the People's National Convention. These obtained 8.7%, 3.15% and 14.34% respectively of the total valid votes cast.
