= Adam Mahama =

Ghanaian politician

Member of parliament for Damango/Daboya Constituency
- In office 7 January 1997 – 6 January 2001
- President: John Jerry Rawlings

Personal details
- Party: National Democratic Congress
- Occupation: Politician

Adam Mahama is a Ghanaian politician and the former member of parliament for the Damango-Daboya constituency in the Northern region of Ghana in the second parliament of the 4th republic of Ghana.

== Early life and education ==
Mahama, also popularly known as Mahama Sakan, was born in Daboya. At a young age, he moved to Damongo with his elder brother, where he attended elementary school, Navrongo Secondary School, and Tamale Secondary School. He has 12 known children: Ishmael, Nafisha, Aisha, Nuhu, Yunus, Yussif, Abdul-Hamid, Yasir, Gias, Ibrahim, Henry and Aisha. He was the Northern and Upper East Regional Agricultural Officer and the lead for Global 2000 and many other polities. Mahama holds a BSc in Soil Science from University of Ghana, Legon as well as an MSc in Management and Implementation of Development Projects from UMIST and the Victoria University of Manchester. He holds a qualification in Methods and Techniques of Project Management for his experience in rural agricultural development as an agriculturist and a rural development practitioner.

== Politics ==
Mahama was elected to represent the Damango/Daboya constituency in the 2nd parliament of the 4th republic of Ghana in the 1996 Ghanaian general elections. He was elected on the ticket of the National Democratic Congress. He took over from Edward Aliedong Alhassan also of the National Democratic Congress who represented the constituency in the first parliament of the 4th republic of Ghana. Mahama lost his seat to Alex Seidu Sofo in the subsequent elections of 2000. Sofo had previously lost to Mahama in the election of 1996, the year Mahama was elected.

== Elections ==
Mahama was elected with 8,356 votes out of 17,604 valid votes cast representing 47.47% of the total valid votes cast. He was elected over Alex Seidu Sofo of the People's Convention party, Abdulai Adams of the People's National Convention, and Skido Alhassan Ewuntomah of the National Convention Party. These candidates obtained 42.59%, 7.90%, and 2.04%, respectively, of the total valid votes cast.
