= Effutu (Ghana parliament constituency) =

Constituency in the Central Region of Ghana

- constituency for the Parliament of Ghana
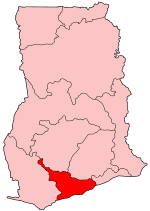
- District: Effutu Municipal District
- Region: Central Region of Ghana

Current constituency
- Party: New Patrotic Party (NPP).
- MP: Alexander Afenyo-Markin

Alex Afenyo Markin is the member of parliament of Effutu constituency, he is on the ticket of NPP. He took over from Mike Allen Hammah who was elected on the ticket of the National Democratic Congress (NDC) and won a majority of 13,114 votes to become the MP. He succeeded Samuel Owusu Agyei who had represented the constituency in the 4th Republic parliament on the ticket of the New Patriotic Party (NPP).

== See also ==
- List of Ghana Parliament constituencies
