= Dresden University of Applied Sciences =

University in Saxony, Germany

Coordinates: 51.0375°N 13.7352°E

HTW Dresden
- Hochschule für Technik und Wirtschaft Dresden
- Motto: Achieve more practically
- Type: Public
- Established: 16 July 1992
- President: Ingo Gestring
- Academic staff: 167 (2017)
- Administrative staff: 868 (2017)
- Students: 4,857 (2017)
- Location: Dresden, Saxony, Germany
- Campus: urban
- Affiliations: HAWtech
- Website: www.htw-dresden.de

The Hochschule für Technik und Wirtschaft Dresden – University of Applied Sciences (HTW Dresden for short) is a university of applied sciences and, after the Technical University Dresden, the second largest university of the city of Dresden (Saxony). It offers 36 study programmes at eight faculties: the Faculty of Civil Engineering/Architecture, the Faculty of Electrical Engineering, the Faculty of Spatial Information, the Faculty of Design, the Faculty of Informatics/Mathematics, the Faculty of Agriculture/Environment/Chemistry, the Faculty of Mechanical Engineering, and the Faculty of Business Administration.

== History ==
The HTW Dresden was founded on 16 July 1992 and was initially divided into 6 subject areas with a total of 15 study programmes. In the following year, the university's offering was expanded to include the Departments of Agriculture / Land Conservation (today: Agriculture / Environment / Chemistry) as well as Design. The latter was renamed the Faculty of Design as part of the implementation of new study programmes in 2018. The same year, the Language Centre and University Sports Department were established and the University Library was opened. As a founding member, the HTW Dresden has been one of the five universities in Germany that are members of the nationwide association ‘HochschulAllianz für Angewandte Wissenschaften’ HAWtech since 2009. In 2011 the slogan ‘Practically achieve more’ (praktisch mehr erreichen ) was established as the motto of the HTW Dresden, and the sponsor association ‘HTW Dresden e. V.’ was founded.

== Location ==
The HTW Dresden has two primary locations: the Friedrich-List-Platz campus near the main train station in Dresden and the Pillnitz campus in the Pillnitz district of Dresden, where parts of the Faculty of Agriculture / Environment / Chemistry are situated. Both locations have a library on site.

== Organisation ==
The organisation of the HTW Dresden consists of faculties, central institutions and elected committees.

=== Rectorate ===
The Rectorate of the HTW Dresden represents the university externally and bears responsibility for the direction of its scientific work. At present (as of April 2017) Roland Stenzel holds the position of rector, Knut Schmidtke as vice rector for research and development, Ralph Sonntag as vice rector for teaching and studies, and Monika Niehues as chancellor. The rector heads the university, executes the resolutions decreed by the central bodies in accordance with Section 80 SächsHSFG and ensures that the rules and regulations of the university are upheld. To date, the following rectors have officiated at the HTW Dresden: • Wolfgang Braun (founding rector 1992–1996) • Günther Otto (1996–2003) • Hannes Neumann (2003–2010) • Roland Stenzel (since 2010) The administrative function of the HTW Dresden, which is headed by the chancellor, consists of a total of five departments: • Department of Student Affairs • Department for Budget and Controlling • Department of Human Resources • Department of Technology • Department of Organisation and Documentation

=== Central Services ===
==== Library ====
The University Library of the HTW Dresden serves as a scientific library with a primary focus on studies, teaching and research at the HTW Dresden. However, it is also available to all citizens of Saxony for vocational and general training. In addition to the central library situated on the Friedrich-List-Platz campus, there is a branch library in Dresden-Pillnitz for the Faculty of Agriculture / Environment / Chemistry. The range of media is predominantly characterised by the subjects that are taught at the HTW Dresden.

==== IT Centre ====
As a key function of the HTW Dresden, the University IT Centre is responsible for managing the university's IT communication infrastructure, as well as operating the central servers and other services. As a service provider, the IT Centre also offers the faculties and facilities of the HTW Dresden additional services, including assistance with the procurement of computer systems.

==== Sports ====
The Sports Department of the HTW Dresden offers a whole host of sport disciplines under the motto – ‘Studying together – Playing sport together’. Different courses are available to students including gymnastics, fitness, ball sports, strength training, martial arts, cycling, water and fun sport.

==== Career Service ====
The Career Service offers students further courses in so-called key qualifications, counselling and coaching during times of personal upheaval and during their application process, as well as different ways of searching for internships, support during thesis work and entry-level positions.

==== Zentrum für fachübergreifende Bildung (ZfB) ====
The members of staff manage the interdisciplinary education of HTW students, in order to ensure their employability later on. On the one hand, this is facilitated by students participating in (and obtaining key qualifications from) the course offers available for their area of study, and by receiving training from the Language Centre. On the other hand, this is also supported by offers for teachers in the field of didactics and e-learning. The centre forms part of the Faculty of Business and Economics.

== Faculties and study programmes ==
=== Bachelor's study programmes ===
Faculty of Electrical Engineering

- Electrical Engineering and Information Technology (B. Eng.)
- Electrical Engineering (B. Eng.)

Faculty of Spatial Information

- Geomatics (B. Eng.)

Faculty of Design

- Design: Product and Communication (B.A.)

Faculty of Informatics / Mathematics

- Informatics (B. Sc.)
- Media Informatics (B. Sc.)
- Business Informatics (B. Sc.)

Faculty of Agriculture / Environment / Chemistry

- Agronomics (B. Sc.)
- Horticulture (B. Sc.)
- Environmental Monitoring (B. Sc.)
- Chemical Engineering (B. Sc.)

Faculty of Business Administration

- Business Administration (B. A.)
- International Business (B. A.)
- Business Administration and Engineering (B. Eng.)

=== Master study programmes ===
Faculty of Civil Engineering / Architecture

- Civil Engineering (M. Sc.)
- Environmental Engineering (M.Eng.)

Faculty of Electrical Engineering

- Electrical Engineering (M. Sc.)

Faculty of Spatial Information

- Spatial Information / Management (M. Eng.)

Faculty of Design

- Product Design (M. A.)

Faculty of Informatics / Mathematics

- Applied Information Technologies (M. Sc.)

Faculty of Agriculture/ Environment / Chemistry

- Production Management for Agronomics and Horticulture (M. Sc.)
- Landscape Development (M.Sc.)
- Chemical Engineering, M.Sc.

Faculty of Business Administration

- International Management (M. A.) from summer semester 2019 onwards
- Business Administration and Engineering (M. Eng.)
- Management of Small and Mid-sized Companies / Family Firms (M. A.)
- Human Resources Management[5] (M. B. A

=== Diploma study programmes ===
Faculty of Civil Engineering / Architecture

- Civil Engineering (Dipl. Ing. (FH))

Faculty of Electrical Engineering

- Electrical Engineering and Information Technology (Dipl. Ing. (FH))
- Correspondence Course Electrical Engineering / Communication Technology (Dipl. Ing. (FH))

Faculty of Spatial Information

- Correspondence Course Surveying (Dipl. Ing. (FH))

Faculty of Informatics / Mathematics

- Informatics (Dipl. Inf. (FH))
- Media Informatics (Dipl. Inf. (FH))
- Business Informatics (Dipl. Wirt. Inf. (FH))

Faculty of Mechanical Engineering

- General Mechanical Engineering (Dipl. Ing. (FH))
- Vehicle Engineering (Dipl. Ing. (FH))
- Production Engineering (Dipl. Ing. (FH))
- Building Systems Management (Dipl. Ing. (FH))

== Research and institutes ==
The following 4 profile lines represent the research areas of the HTW Dresden: Mobile Systems and Mechatronics

- Innovative Power Train Engineering
- Vehicle and Agricultural Engineering
- Construction and Manufacturing Technologies
- Applied Robotics
- Function Technologies
- Modelling and Simulation

Sustainable Livelihoods

- Building, City and Landscape Design, Environmental Monitoring
- Renewable Energies
- Geotechnics, Water Management, Traffic
- Construction and Materials Technologies
- Chemical and Biochemical Engineering
- Horticulture and Agriculture

Information Systems

- Media Technology
- Product Design
- Geographic Information Systems
- Web-based Systems
- Model-based Software Development
- Audio and Video Systems

Corporate Management and Incorporation

- Start-ups from universities
- Management of Medium-sized Companies
- Competence Management and Coaching for Business Succession

In addition, there are various research institutes at the HTW Dresden:
Zentrum für angewandte Forschung und Technologie (ZAFT) The ‘Zentrum für angewandte Forschung und Technologie e. V.’ (ZAFT) supports research activities in close cooperation with HTW Dresden, in particular with regard to interdisciplinary and cross-faculty projects. It was founded on 1 February 1998, and involves students and partners from both research and industry.
Forschungsinstitut Intelligente Interaktive Technische Systeme (FIITS) The ‘Forschungsinstitut Intelligente Interaktive Technische Systeme (FIITS)’ is a scientific institution at the Faculty of Informatics / Mathematics. Its primary objective is to support junior scientists as part of research and doctoral projects. The research institute also provides the faculty's sustainable research infrastructure.
Zentrum für Mittelstand (ZfM) The ‘Zentrum für Mittelstand (ZfM)’ is an association comprising professors and scientists from the Faculty of Economics as well as external specialists, who aim to support the success and development of medium-sized companies in Saxony. This includes the establishment of a dedicated professorship to the topic of medium-size company management, a mentoring program for students and an annual SME day.
Gründungsschmiede – Partner der Gründungsinitiative dresden | exists With its company founders’ association – the so-called ‘Gründungsschmiede’, the HTW Dresden offers a range of services for business start-ups. In addition to various qualification measures, those interested in founding companies and established young entrepreneurs are supported with consulting and coaching as well as the provision of infrastructure and offices.

== Student body ==
The constituent student body (Studierendenschaft) is a sub-body of Public law Self-governing bodies|public law with the right to self-governance, represented by the Student Council as provided by the Higher Education Act of the Land. The StuRa considers itself the central point of contact for all student matters.

Between 2013 and 2022, the student body was a member of the fzs (the federal umbrella organization of student unions in Germany). For more than half of this duration, the student body was also active in its internal structures, such as the Committee of Student Bodies.

Since late 2019, the subdivision into departmental student bodies has been discontinued; consequently, since 2020, independent departmental student councils no longer exist as separate entities.

== International matters ==
=== Partner universities ===
The HTW Dresden cooperates with roughly 145 universities worldwide within the framework of university agreements, or within the framework of the ‘Erasmus +’ EU programme. These contacts form the basis for scientific collaboration in teaching and research, as well as for the exchange of students and university lecturers.

=== Dual degree programme ===
Dual degree programmes enable students to obtain a degree from the HTW Dresden and the corresponding partner university at the same time, without extending the specified study period. This means that the study programme can be enhanced by way of integrated courses, and other linguistic, cultural and university environments can be discovered. The degrees awarded by the HTW Dresden are Diploma, Bachelor or Master, as well as the equivalent degree of a student's corresponding home university.

=== Faranto e.V. ===
Faranto e.V. is a student initiative for intercultural understanding at the HTW Dresden. It promotes, among other things, an international exchange, it supervises guest students at the HTW, and provides information on stays abroad.

== Regular events ==
Traditionally, the HTW Dresden holds an information day on the second Thursday in January and on a Saturday in April, during which students can obtain key information for their time at the university. One of the highlights of the year is the so-called ‘Dresden Researchers’ Night’, which provides all those interested with an insight into the scientific landscape. As at many other universities, a Dies Academicus is held annually at the HTW Dresden. There is also a research day once a year, which was first held in 2010. In addition, the Student Council at the HTW Dresden holds an introductory event for all new students at the beginning of the academic year. The event is intended to make it easier for students to start their studies, but also to enable them to get to know other first-semester students or those already studying. The individual faculties also regularly host their own specific events:

- The Faculty of Civil Engineering has hosted the annual ‘Saxon Radon Day’ since 2007, where topics of radon-proof construction and renovation are discussed.
- The Faculty of Electrical Engineering regularly offers scientific seminars to stimulate communication between students, scientists and industry experts.
- Together with the DVW Saxony, the Faculty of Spatial Information organises a winter lecture series in which the latest topics are discussed.
- At the Faculty of Design, a public presentation of semester papers takes place at the end of the winter semester.
- Once a month, the Faculty of Informatics / Mathematics offers a so-called ‘Database Regulars’ Table’.
- The Faculty of Agriculture / Environment / Chemistry hosts the Green Forum Pillnitz together with the Saxon State Office for the Environment, Agriculture and Geology, the Julius-Kühn-Institute and the Saxon State Enterprise ‘Palaces, Castles and Gardens of Saxony’. Shared presentations are held during which research results, education, teaching and joint events are in the spotlight.
- The Faculty of Mechanical Engineering has been organising the annual Dresden Commercial Vehicle Day since 2011, in order to stimulate interest among students and other interested parties for commercial vehicle technology, which is offered as part of the vehicle technology study programme.
- The Faculty of Business Administration holds "SME Day" annually in April; it deals with current business management issues in the context of a practice-oriented specialist conference. Company representatives, the managers and employees of associations as well as University professors present and discuss current information on SME topics.

== Awards/honours ==
- Germany's best university of applied sciences for business start-ups (Jan. 2009)
- Recognised as an ‘ÖKOPROFIT®’ business (June 17, 2013)
- Awarded the "family friendly university" certificate (June 17, 2014)
- HTW Dresden is the first Saxon university of applied sciences to receive the Seal of System Accreditation (22 December 2016)
