= Bongo (Ghana parliament constituency) =

Ghana parliament constituency

- constituency for the Parliament of Ghana
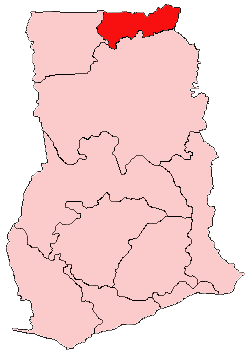
- District: Bongo District
- Region: Upper East Region of Ghana

Current constituency
- Party: National Democratic Congress
- MP: Charles Bawaduah

Bongo is one of the constituencies represented in the Parliament of Ghana. It elects one Member of Parliament (MP) by the first past the post system of election. Charles Bawaduah is the member of parliament for the constituency. Bongo is located in the Bongo district of the Upper East Region of Ghana.

== Boundaries ==
The seat is located within the Bongo District in the Upper East Region of Ghana.

== Members of Parliament ==
| Election | Member | Party | Term |
|---|---|---|---|
| 1954 | William Atia Amoro | Convention People's Party | 1954 – 1966 |
| 1969 | Azabiri Ayamga | Progress Party | 1969 – 1972 |
| 1979 | Asoko Asampambila | People's National Convention | 1979 – 1981 |
| 1992 | Gaaga Akayeri Azitariga | National Democratic Congress | 1992 – 1996 |
| 1996 | Simon Alangde Asabo | National Democratic Congress | 1996 – 2000 |
| 2000 | Albert Abongo | National Democratic Congress | 2000 – 2016 |
| 2016 | Edward Abambire Bawa | National Democratic Congress | 2016 – 2024 |
| 2024 | Charles Bawaduah | National Democratic Congress | 2024 – Present |

== Elections ==
2008 Ghanaian parliamentary election: Bongo Source:Ghana Home Page
| Party | Candidate | Votes | % | ±% |
|---|---|---|---|---|
| National Democratic Congress | Albert Abongo | 17,073 | 57.8 | — |
| New Patriotic Party | Asampana Akurigo Francis | 9,817 | 33.2 | — |
| People's National Convention | Jacob Kofi Nsoh | 2,373 | 8.0 | — |
| Convention People's Party | Benedict Aduko | 286 | 1.0 | — |
| Majority | | 8,256 | 24.6 | — |
| Turnout | | — | — | — |

== See also ==
- List of Ghana Parliament constituencies
