= Uncle Ebo Whyte =

Ghanaian playwright

- Born: James Ebo Whyte; South Suntreso, Kumasi, Ghana
- Education: South Suntreso L/A middle school, Kumasi; Osu Presbyterian Senior High School; University of Ghana
- Occupations: Ghanaian playwright, author, motivational speaker and artistic director
- Parent(s): James Whyte Sr. and Baaba Esama

Uncle Ebo Whyte (born James Ebo Whyte; 20 July 1954) is a Ghanaian playwright, author and motivational speaker. He is the artistic director and lead writer at Roverman Productions and has written and directed over 59 plays for stage since 2008. His plays include Not My Husband, The Day Dad Came, Unhappy Wives Confused Husbands, Dear God Comma, Rejected, Dora Why, Blackmail and many others. Ebo Whyte is also the author of the Rover Monthly Report, an inspirational magazine, and has two novels: The Deal and The Perfect Couple written by him.

As an acclaimed playwright he has contributed to the revival of theatre in Ghana after a long dormancy due to political upheavals.

== Early life and education ==
Uncle Ebo, a Fante, was born and raised in South Suntreso, Kumasi, in Ghana to a fishmonger mother, Baaba Esama, whom he described as 'fiesty', and ex-boxer father, Mr. Whyte. He grew up the first of five boys in a competitive household and one in which his parents did not hide which of their children they favored and he was his father's favorite. Ebo Whyte was always under the pressure of comparison with his younger brother who he describes as "more handsome, more adjusted, more intelligent". He confessed that he "had a difficult battle with an inferiority complex" and couldn't bring himself to answer a question in class. When he was 15, his father died, and his family lost everything to the large, extended family because those were the days before the Provisional National Defense Council (PNDC) law came into place, for when a man died interstate, which protects the widow and the children.

He was then moved to live with a maternal uncle in Accra to be able to continue onto Secondary School, and for three years he sold bread to supplement his upkeep.

He had his basic education in at South Suntreso L/A middle school, Kumasi and continued his secondary education in Accra at the Osu Presbyterian Senior High School for O' levels and self tutored for his A' levels. After that, he worked for six years to gather funds before continuing onto the University of Ghana, Legon to read statistics. He was a resident of and affiliated to the popular Commonwealth Hall, popularly called the Vandals. He later self tutored and sat for some of the professional examinations for Chartered accountants, ACCA and Professional Marketing Examinations, ICEM but decided last minute against accounting. He wanted a life of spinning stories into gold.

He worked as the head of marketing and finance in a bookselling company for a period of time before pursuing his passion as a playwright.

== Career ==
=== Pre-playwright career ===
He started his career post secondary school, he worked for six years with Ghana's SSNIT as a clerk, during and after his first degree he worked with Asempa Publishers and later as the head of marketing and finance with Challenge bookshop. He's also worked in the financial sector, pharmaceutical and automobile sectors of Ghana for a period of time before fully pursuing his passion as a playwright.

=== Early playwright career ===
His introduction to theatre in secondary school, was by accident . He recounts that whilst observing his school drama club rehearsing a play, he inadvertently memorized the lines and when the cast for the main character failed to turn up for rehearsals, he stepped in and got the role. From then on, his interest was piqued. Throughout the early years of his career, theatre was treated as a hobby. After graduating University, he served as the artistic director with a theatre group which performed in schools and churches in 1974, called J-Theatre. Between 1974 and 1992, he wrote 17 plays, the first play entitled Man Must Live. However, the biggest challenge for him was his transition to commercial theatre from 1989. Between 1989 and 1992, he ventured into commercial theatre with three plays and they all failed financially—The Devil's Wife, Mr President Your Move, and Wedding Behind Closed Doors.

=== Roverman Productions ===
In 2004, went full time into theatre, registered his company Roverman Productions and in 2008 he tried commercial theatre again with the play Unhappy Wives; Confused Husbands which was produced with a loan of 5000ghc from a friend. And this time he succeeded and since 2008 he has produced four new plays every quarter of every year until the COVID-19 pandemic disrupted activities. He and his company have since the pandemic, commenced virtual theatre, taking their works onto the internet at www.rovermanproductions.com.

He's acclaimed as Ghana's most successful playwright and is credited as the one who revived theatre after political upheavals.

He has also authored two novels, The Deal and The Perfect Couple both available on amazon. He published The Rover Report Monthly Magazine, a lifestyle magazine which run for 74 editions.

He is a social commentator and has for over 28 years, consistently, presented on his bi-weekly program dubbed "Food for Thought" on the radio station, Joy FM.

He also hosts a once a week live Facebook session on relationships, dubbed "Encore".

== Personal life ==
Uncle Ebo married his wife, Florence in 1983 and the couple do not have biological children of their own but have several adopted children.

== Produced plays ==
Number	Play Title	Year
1	Unhappy Wives; Confused Husbands	2008
2	Mr. President your move	2009
3	The Devil in the Mirror	2009
4	What Dad Left Behind	2009
5	Dad is Mom, Mom is Dad	2010
6	House of Secrets	2010
7	Terms of Divorce	2010
8	Caught in the Act	2010
9	Different Shades of Women	2011
10	He Loves me, He loves me not	2011
11	Life is Someway	2011
12	The Day Dad Came	2011
13	Sins of the Fathers	2012
14	Trials of the Ghanaian	2012
15	Don't Mess With A Woman	2012
16	Everyone Has a Secret	2012
17	Apartment N1	2013
18	What's My Name	2013
19	Men Run Women Cry	2013
20	The Last Flight	2013
21	Make me a woman Tonight	2014
22	Games Men Play	2014
23	Unforgiven	2014
24	Women on Fire	2014
25	The Smartest Man	2015
26	Forbidden	2015
27	Bananas and Groundnuts	2015
28	Puppeteers	2015
29	One Million Pounds	2016
30	Dear God Comma	2016
31	Sankofa	2016
32	Rejected	2016
33	Blackmail	2017
34	Damaged Goods	2017
35	The Comeback	2017
36	Nicholas!	2017
37	Special Delivery	2018
38	The Women in The Bathroom	2018
39	A Crazy Ride	2018
40	Sex Scandal	2018
41	Dora Why?	2019
42	I Want Your Wife	2019
43	Not My Husband	2019
44	God You're Fired	2019
45	Final Warning	2020
