= Half Assini Senior High School =

Location
- P. O. Box 60; Half Assini, Western Region; Ghana
- 5°03′00″N 2°53′00″W

Information
- School type: Public high school
- Motto: Only the best is good for Africa
- Established: 12 August 1960 (65 years ago)
- Founder: Kwame Nkrumah
- Status: Active
- School district: Jomoro Municipal
- Category: B
- Oversight: Ministry of Education
- Headmaster: Mr Patrick Adjei-Ampaw
- Gender: Co-educational
- Age: 12 to 18
- Classes offered: Business, general arts, general science, home economics, visual arts
- Houses: 4
- Colours: Blue, yellow and white
- Mascot: Porcupine
- Nickname: Osagyefo mba
- Accreditation: Ghana Education Service
- Alumni: Half Assini Secondary School Old Students Association (HASSOSA)
- Website: www.hascoedugh.webs.com

Half Assini Senior High School, popularly known as HASCO, is a coeducational senior high school located at Half Assini in the Western Region of Ghana.

== History ==
The school was one of the schools founded by the first president of Ghana, Dr. Kwame Nkrumah. He founded the school with sixty students and four teachers. The school was among the few early established schools in the country (Modern Ghana) and it attracted the best of brains across the continent. Most of the infrastructure in the school now was originally put up by Nkrumah, and sincerely it had one of the best science resource centers in the country at the time. The school offers several courses( General arts, General Science, Business, Visual Art, Home economics, Agriculture science). The school have four houses/halls. Mensah Sarbah( green), Amuhyia Kpanyinli(red), William Armoh ( yellow) and Aggrey( blue). HASCO have a very beautiful auditorium call The Tulow Hall. They also have two boys dormitories and two girls dormitories.

== Student body ==
The school has about 1,600 students.

== See also ==
- Education in Ghana
- List of senior high schools in Ghana
- PeaceJam Ghana
