= Simon Abingya =

Ghanaian politician

Member of Parliament for Bolgatanga Constituency
- In office 7 January 1997 – 6 January 2001
- President: Jerry John Rawlings
- Parliamentary group: National Democratic Party

Personal details
- Born: Simon Anyoa Abingya

Simon Anyoa Abingya is a Ghanaian politician and a member of the 2nd parliament of the 4th republic of Ghana representing Bolgatanga Constituency under the membership of the National Democratic Congress (NDC).

== Political career ==
Abingya began his political career in 1997. He was elected into parliament on 7 January 1997 after emerging winner at the 1996 Ghanaian General Election after defeating David Apasara of the People's National Convention, James Ben Kaba of the New Patriotic Party and Amiyinne Francis of the National Convention Party.

He obtained 42.80% of the total valid votes cast which is equivalent to 26,816 votes while his oppositions obtained 24.90% which is equivalent to 15,577 votes, 6.20% which is equivalent to 3,861 votes and 1.50% which is equivalent to 956 votes respectively.

After completing his first term in office, Abingya decided to run for the second time but was defeated alongside his other competitors by his previous opponent David Apasara who obtained 50.90% of the total valid votes which is equivalent to 20,459 votes while Abingya obtained 42.8% which is equivalent to 12,884 votes. His other competitors namely; G.A. Agambila of the New Patriotic Party obtained 14.40% which is equivalent to 5,770 votes, Martin R.M.A. Minstapm of the National Reform Party obtained 1.30% which is equivalent to 511 votes, Emmanuel A. Ajusiyah of the Convention People's Party obtained 0.80% which is equivalent to 305 votes and Baba Mohammed of the United Ghana Movement obtained 0.70% which is equivalent to 274 votes.
