= Mike Hammah =

Ghanaian politician

Hon. Mike Allen Hammah
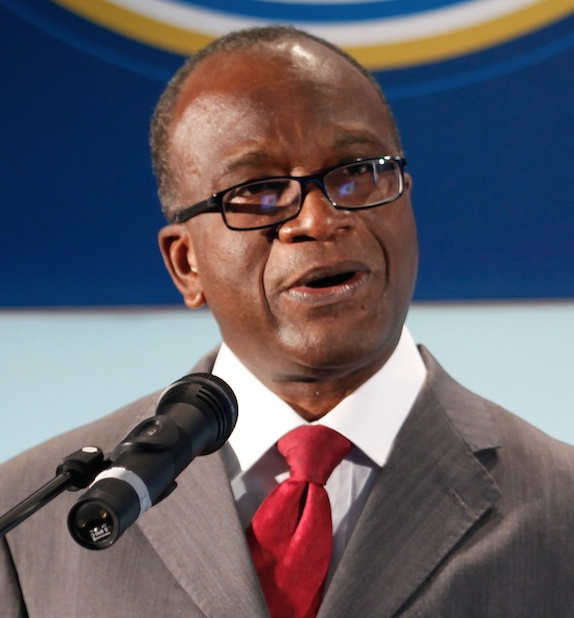
- Mike Hammah during the 5th EITI Global Conference (2011) in Paris, France

Member of the Ghana Parliament for Effutu
- In office 7 January 2009 – 6 January 2013
- Preceded by: Samuel Owusu Agyei
- Succeeded by: Alexander Afenyo-Markin

Member of Parliament for Effutu
- In office Jan 1997 – Jan 2005

Minister for Lands and Natural Resources
- In office Jan 2011 – Jan 2013
- President: John Atta Mills
- Preceded by: Collins Dauda
- Succeeded by: Inusah Fuseini

Minister for Transport
- In office Jan 2009 – Jan 2011
- President: John Atta Mills
- Preceded by: Godfred T. Bonyon
- Succeeded by: Collins Dauda

Personal details
- Born: 28 August 1955 (age 71) Winneba
- Party: National Democratic Congress
- Children: 3
- Education: Kwame Nkrumah University of Science and Technology Central University
- Profession: Development Planners/Architects/Quantity Surveyors

Mike Allen Hammah (was born 28 August 1955) is a politician and a former Minister for Lands and Natural Resources of Ghana. He had been the Minister for Transport until January 4, 2011, when he was moved after a cabinet reshuffle by President Mills. He was also the Member of Parliament for the Effutu Constituency in the Central Region of Ghana.

== Early life and education ==
Hammah was born on 28 August 1955. He hails from Winneba in the Central Region of Ghana. He attended Ghana Secondary Technical School, Takoradi for his Ordinary and Advanced level education between 1969 and 1976. He is also a graduate of Kwame Nkrumah University of Science and Technology where he obtained his first degree in Building technology in 1980. He continued his education in the Post-Graduate level at the Central University College where he obtained his Master of Business Administration degree in finance in 2008.

== Career ==
Hammah by profession is a Development Planner, Architect, and Quantity Surveyor.

== Political career ==
Hammah is a member of the National Democratic Congress. He served his first term in parliament between 1996 and 2000 as Member of Parliament representing Effutu Constituency and was appointed Deputy Minister of Roads and Transport during that time. He also served as a member of the parliamentary committee on Privileges. He was re-elected into office in 2001 and served as Deputy ranking member- Committee on Roads and Transport and Committee of Holding of Office of Profit. In February 2009, he was sworn in as Minister for Transport by John Atta Mills. He was appointed as Minister for Lands and Natural Resources in a re-shuffle by President Mills on 4 January 2011.

== Elections ==
Hammah was first elected into Parliament on the Ticket of the National Democratic Congress during the 1996 Ghanaian General Elections for the Efutu Constituency in the Central Region of Ghana. He polled 11,398 votes out of the valid votes cast representing 42.80% over his opponents Joseph Nunoo-Mensah an NPP member who polled 9,144 votes, Emma H.Tandoh a CPP member who polled 0 vote, and Kingsley Arko-Sam an IND member who also polled 0 vote. He won again in 2000 with 9,716 votes out of the 20,040 valid votes cast representing 48.10% over his opponents Oheneba A. Akyeampong an NPP member, Frank Ebo Sam an IND member, Kingsley Arko Sam a CPP member and Ebenezer Newman-Acquah a PNC member who polled 9,470 votes, 399 votes, 275 votes and 180 votes respectively.

He was elected as the Member of parliament in the 5th parliament of the 4th republic of Ghana for the Effutu constituency after winning the 2008 Ghanaian general elections on the ticket of the National Democratic Congress. In this elections he was elected after obtaining 15,297 votes out of the 28,055 total valid votes cast equivalent to 54.5% of total valid votes cast. He was elected over Samuel Owusu-Agyei of the New Patriotic Party and Henry Kweku Bortsie of the Convention People's Party. These obtained 43.39% and 2.08% respectively out of the total valid votes cast.

== Workshops and courses ==
He has also taken part in a number of domestic and international workshops and courses. Workshops and courses attended include the Public Investment Program in Ghana, which was organized by M. D. P. I., the Entrepreneur Development Program, which was organized by Empretech Ghana Limited, and the Exporting to Developed Countries program, which was organized by CBI, Holland in the Netherlands and the US Department of Transportation's Open Skies Policy African Perspective workshop were held in Chicago, USA, among other places.

== Personal life ==
Hammah is married with three children. He is a Christian (Methodist).

== See also ==
- List of Mills government ministers

Parliament of Ghana
Preceded by R. E. A. Ayirebi-Acquah	Effutu; 1997 – 2005	Succeeded by Samuel Owusu Agyei
Preceded by Samuel Owusu Agyei	Effutu; 2009 – present	Incumbent
Political offices
Preceded by Godfred T. Bonyon	Ministry for Transport; 2009 – 2011	Succeeded by Collins Dauda
Preceded by Collins Dauda	Ministry for Lands and Mineral Resources; 2011 – present	Incumbent
