= Tamale Technical University =

Public Technical University in Ghana

Coordinates: 9°25′50″N 0°52′02″W

- Former name: Tamale Polytechnic
- Motto: Bagsim mini nuuni tuma
- Type: Public Technical University
- Established: 1951; 75 years ago
- Chairman: Alhassan Emil Abdulai
- Vice-Chancellor: Prof. Bashir Ibrahim Imoro Saeed
- Location: Tamale, Northern Region, Ghana
- Campus: Urban area
- Website: www.tatu.edu.gh/index.php

Tamale Technical University (TaTU), initially called Tamale Polytechnic(T.poly), is located in the northern part of Ghana. The branches are the Tamale main and the Yendi branch.

== About Tamale Technical University ==
The university was founded in 1951 as a trades school and in 1963 as a technical institute. There are roughly 7,000 varied students enrolled at the university. The Commonwealth Association of Technical Universities and Polytechnics in Africa counts TaTU as one of its members. Additionally, it is a member of the Conference of Vice-Chancellors of Technical Universities and Rectors of Polytechnics in Ghana and the Association of Principals of Technical Institutes in Ghana.

The University would be hosting the 5th Applied Research Conference of Technical Universities of Ghana (ARCTUG 2028) in 2028 .

TaTU has over 30 practical-oriented programmes and 14,000 students and has recorded about 95 percent graduate success.

On Tuesday, September 6th 2025, students of the university staged a protest against school management against fees hikes and poor hostel facilities.

== Faculties and departments ==
=== Faculty of Applied Arts ===
- Languages and Liberal Studies
- Industrial Art
- Media & Communication Studies
- Fashion, Design & Textiles

=== Faculty of Applied Science & Technology ===
- Computer Science department
- Hospitality & Tourism Management (HTM)
- Statistical Sciences

=== Faculty of Business ===
- Accountancy
- Marketing
- Secretaryship and Management Studies

=== Faculty of Engineering ===
- Agricultural Engineering
- Automotive Engineering
- Electrical and Electronic Engineering
- Mechanical Engineering
- Tropical Agriculture
- Water and Sanitation Engineering
- Welding and Fabrication

=== Faculty of Built and Natural Environment ===
- Building Technology
- Civil Engineering
- Wood Technology

=== Faculty of Allied Health and Pharmaceutical Sciences ===
- BSc. in Nutrition and Lifestyle Medicine
- BTech in Health Information Management
- BTech in Medical Laboratory Technology
- Diploma in Nutrition 3 years

=== Faculty of Creative Arts and Technology ===
Source:

=== Faculty of Agriculture ===
Source:

== See also ==
- List of universities in Ghana
- Education in Ghana
