= Ahmed Alhassan Yakubu =

Ghanaian politician

Member of the Ghanaian Parliament for Mion
- In office 2004–2016

Personal details
- Born: 3 December 1957 (age 68)
- Party: National Democratic Congress
- Education: Imperial College London
- Occupation: farmer

Ahmed Alhassan Yakubu (born 3 December 1957) is a fine Agriculturist/Farmer and Ghanaian politician. He is also a member of the Sixth Parliament of the Fourth Republic who represents the Mion Constituency.

== Personal life ==
Yakubu is a Muslim, and is married with three children.

== Early life and education ==
Yakubu was born on 3 December 1957. He hails from Sang, a town in the Northern Region of Ghana. He graduated from Imperial College, University of London, and obtained his Doctor of Philosophy degree in agronomy in 2000.

== Politics ==
Yakubu is a member of the National Democratic Congress. He was first elected into parliament on the ticket of the National Democratic Congress during the December 2004 Ghanaian General Elections as a member of Parliament for the Mion constituency. He polled 10,568 votes out of the 27,034 valid votes cast representing 39.10%. He won his re-election bid in 2008 with 11,977 votes out of the 27,118 valid votes cast representing 44.17%. He contested again in 2012 and polled 9,931 votes out of the 25,115 valid votes cast representing 39.54%.

== Career ==
- Council for Scientific and Industrial Research - Savanna Agricultural Research Institute
- Member of Parliament (January 2005 – January 2017)
- Farmer/agriculturist
