= Bolgatanga Central (Ghana parliament constituency) =

Ghanaian parliamentary constituency

- constituency for the Parliament of Ghana
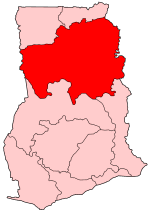
- District: Bolgatanga Municipal District
- Region: Upper East Region of Ghana

Current constituency
- Party: National Democratic Congress
- MP: Isaac Adongo

Bolgatanga Central is one of the constituencies represented in the Parliament of Ghana. It elects one Member of parliament by the first-past-the-post system of election. The Bolgatanga Central constituency is located in the Bolgatanga Municipal District of the Upper East Region of Ghana.

== Boundaries ==
The seat is located entirely within the Bolgatanga Municipal District of the Upper East Region of Ghana.

== Members of Parliament ==
| Election | Member | Party |
|---|---|---|
| 2016 | Isaac Adongo | NDC |

Ghanaian parliamentary election, 2016: Bolgatanga Central Source:Peacefmonline
| Party | Candidates | Votes | % |
|---|---|---|---|
| National Democratic Congress | Isaac Adongo | 25,042 | 51.41 |
| NPP | Rex Simeon Atareyella Asanga | 15,610 | 32.04 |
| PNC | Thomas Akurugu | 7,431 | 15.25 |
| PPP | Sampson Ayindongo Akolgo | 288 | 0.59 |
| CPP | Abdul-Rahman Latifa | 174 | 0.36 |
| APC | Richard Ayamga | 169 | 0.35 |

== See also ==
- List of Ghana Parliament constituencies
- List of political parties in Ghana
