= Laadi Ayii Ayamba =

Ghanaian politician

Hon. Laadi Ayii Ayamba MP
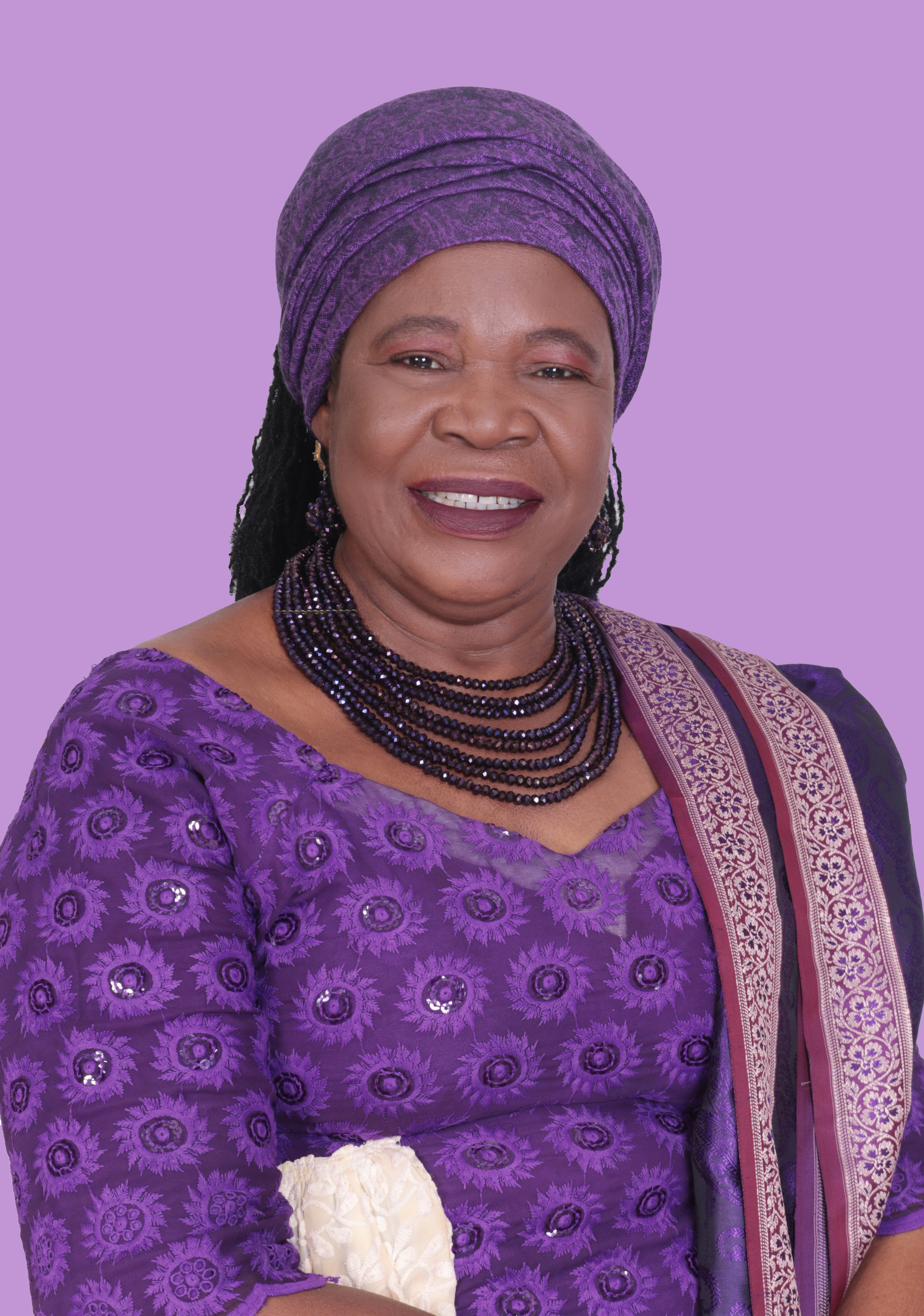

Member of the Ghana Parliament for Pusiga Constituency
- Incumbent
- Assumed office 7 January 2013

Personal details
- Born: 26 December 1961 (age 64) Pusiga, Ghana
- Party: National Democratic Congress
- Children: 5
- Education: University of Education, Winneba
- Occupation: Politician
- Profession: Teacher

Laadi Ayii Ayamba is a Ghanaian politician and member of the 8th parliament of the 4th Republic of Ghana representing the Pusiga Constituency in the Upper East Region on the ticket of the National Democratic Congress. She was also a member of the 6th,7th,8th and 9th parliament. She is a woman activist and mostly addresses issues relating to women on the floor of parliament. She served as the chairperson of the Committee on Gender and Children in the 6th parliament of the 4th Republic of Ghana from 2013 to 2017.

== Early life and education ==
Laadi Ayi Ayamba was born on 26 December 1961, she is a native of Pusiga in the Upper East Region. She attended middle school at the Pusiga Continuation Middle School. She furthered her education from that point at the Gbewaa Teacher Training College, where she graduated as a trained teacher. She later went to the University of Education, Winneba where she obtained a bachelor's degree in Basic Education.

== Career ==
Ayamba started her professional career as a teacher from 1981 to 1991. She was then a head-teacher until 2000, where she was reappointed as Officer in charge of Day Nursery Schools by the Ghana Education Service.

== Politics ==
=== Member of parliament ===
Ayamba is a member of the National Democratic Congress, and she took her seat in parliament as the Member of Parliament for the Pusiga Constituency, Upper East Region after being elected over her opponents Simon Akunye Atingban and Osman Aludiba Ayuba who were contesting for the same position. She won the election with a total of 15,847 votes out of the 29,592 valid votes, representing 46.78% of the total valid votes.

==== ECOWAS ====
In 2021, Laadi together with Alexander Kwamena Afenyo-Markin, Abdul-Aziz Ayaba Musah, Johnson Kwaku Adu and Emmanuel Kwasi Bedzrah were sworn in during the Extraordinary Session 2021 of the Parliament of the ECOWAS which happened in Freetown in Sierra Leone.

==== Chairperson on Committee on Gender and Children ====
She served as the Chairperson of the Parliamentary Committee on Gender and Children. She represented Ghana in Geneva, Switzerland at the 59th session of UN Convention on the Elimination of all forms of Discrimination against Women (CEDAW) to contribute to Ghana's efforts to ensuring the elimination of all forms of discrimination against women. In her role she stated that Ghana was making attempts to tackle outmoded harmful cultural practices through promulgation of laws to ban those practices. She also made mention of the country's policy of Livelihood Empowerment Against Poverty (LEAP) which had implemented and needed to be intensified in rural areas where young girls migrate to the cities and to help them stay within their communication and acquire the right skills to improve their societies. She also led the proposal of the gender committee as chairperson to increase sex education in schools to help curb high incidences of teenage pregnancy.

==== Affirmative Action Bill ====
She is a woman advocate who supported the Affirmative Action Bill and supported the bill's provision to ensure that 40 percent quota for political participation for women and also that women should be allowed to contest the ''safe seats'' of their parties to ensure a good representation of women.

==== 2020 elections ====
She retained her seat in the 2020 December elections after winning with a majority of 63 votes. She beat her closest opponent Abdul-Karim Zanni Dubiure of the NPP by getting 14,929 votes representing 42.31% against 14,866 representing 42.13%

== Personal life ==
Ayamba is a Muslim.
