= Isaac Adongo =

Ghanaian politician (born 1972)

The Right Honourable Isaac Adongo
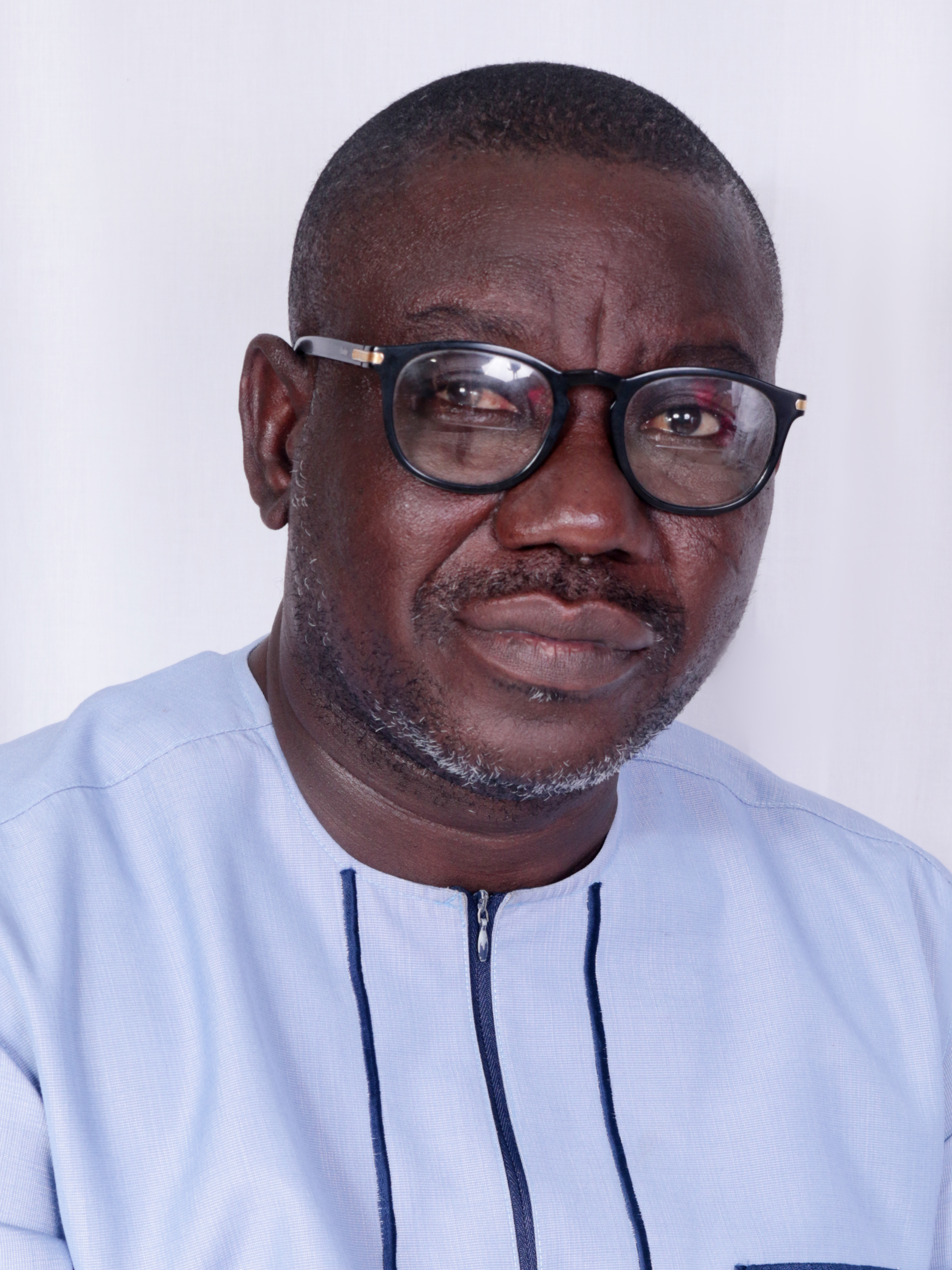

Member of the Ghana Parliament for Bolgatanga Central
- Incumbent
- Assumed office 7 January 2016

Personal details
- Born: 12 October 1972 (age 54) Bolgatanga, Ghana
- Party: National Democratic Congress.
- Children: Jael adongo
- Education: Institute of Chartered Accountants; University of Ghana
- Occupation: Politician
- Committees: Finance, Trade, Industry and Tourism Committee

Isaac Adongo (born 12 October 1972) is a Ghanaian politician and member of the 8th Ghanaian Parliament representing the Bolgatanga Central Constituency in the Upper East Region on the ticket of the National Democratic Congress.

== Early life and education ==
Adongo hails from Bolgatanga. He is a graduate of the Institute of Chartered Accountants and the University of Ghana.

== Career ==
Adongo was first elected in 2016, was re-elected in 2020 and 2024. He is a Ranking Member of Parliament’s Finance Committee.

He came to international attention in 2022 for his criticism of the Vice-President of Ghana, Mahamudu Bawumia, because of the way he used the Manchester United and England national team footballer Harry Maguire as an object of comparison in his speech to attack the economic record of the Vice-President, whom he called an "economic Maguire". He likened the Vice-President's attempts to restore the value of the Ghanaian currency, the Cedi, to Maguire's tendency to score own goals. He subsequently apologized in November 2023.

== Politics ==
Adongo is a member of the National Democratic Congress and a member of parliament for Bolgatanga central constituency in the Seventh and Eighth Parliament of the Fourth Republic of Ghana.

=== 2016 election ===
Adongo contested the Bolgatanga central constituency parliamentary seat on the ticket of the National Democratic Congress during the 2016 Ghanaian general election and won the election with 25,042 votes representing 51.41% of the total votes. He won the election over Asanga Rex Simeon Atareyella of the New Patriotic Party, Thomas Akurugu of the PNC, Sampson Ayindongo Akolgo of the PPP, Abdul-Rahman Latifa of the Convention People's Party and Ayamga Richard of the APC. They obtained 15,610 votes, 431 votes, 288 votes, 174 votes and 169 votes respectively, equivalent to 32.04%, 15.25%, 0.59%, 0.36% and.0.35% of the total votes respectively.

==== 2020 election ====
Adongo was re- elected as a member of parliament for Bolgatanga central (Ghana parliament constituency ) during the 2020 Ghanaian general election on the ticket of the National Democratic Congress. He was elected with 36,726 votes representing 64.45% of the total votes. He won the election over Rex Simeon Atareyella Asanga of the New Patriotic Party who polled 19,794 votes which is equivalent to 34.84%, parliamentary candidate for the LPG Francis Ayadogo had 237 votes representing 0.42% and the parliamentary candidate for the Convention People's Party Abdul-Rahman Latifa had 214 votes representing 0.38% of the total votes.

2024 Election

Adongo won the Bolgatanga central seat as its member of parliament in the 2024 general election.

== Personal life ==
Isaac Adongo identifies as a Christian. .
