= Alabira Ibrahim =

Ghanaian politician

Member of parliament for Mion Constituency
- In office 7 January 1997 – 6 January 2001
- President: John Jerry Rawlings

Personal details
- Born: Mion District, Northern Region, Ghana
- Party: Convention People's Party
- Occupation: Politician

Alabira Ibrahim is a Ghanaian politician and a member of the Second Parliament of the Fourth republic representing the Mion Constituency in the Northern Region of Ghana.

== Early life ==
Ibrahim was born at Mion in the Northern Region of Ghana. He studied mathematics at the University of Cape Coast, Ghana, and at the University of Bristol, United Kingdom.

== Career ==
Alabira is an Educationist and Proprietor of the Tamale-based Sawaba Computer Training School aside being a former member of Parliament for the Mion Constituency. He is also a Development Worker.

== Politics ==
Ibrahim was first elected into Parliament on the ticket of the Convention People's Party for the Mion Constituency in the Northern Region of Ghana during the December 1996 Ghanaian general elections. He polled 9,519 votes out of the 20,937 valid votes cast representing 32.70% over his opponents Iddisah Kojo Jacob who polled 6,198 votes, Abu E. Musah who polled 5,220 votes and Fuseini Saaka Alidu who polled 0 votes.
