= Albert Abongo =

Ghanaian politician and civil engineer

Hon. Albert Abongo

Member of the Ghana Parliament for Bongo
- Incumbent
- Assumed office January 2001
- Preceded by: Simon Alangde Asabo
- Majority: 8,256

Minister for Water Resources, Works and Housing
- Incumbent
- Assumed office February 2009
- President: John Atta Mills
- Preceded by: Boniface Abubakar Saddique

Member of Parliament for Bongo Constituency
- In office 7 January 2005 – 6 January 2009
- President: John Kufuor

Personal details
- Born: 15 September 1959 (age 66) Gowrie-Bongo; Upper East Region; Ghana
- Party: National Democratic Congress
- Children: 3
- Education: Kwame Nkrumah University of Science and Technology
- Occupation: Civil engineer

Albert Abongo (born September 15, 1959) is a Ghanaian politician and civil engineer. Abongo is from the Bongo District near the city of Bolgatanga, Upper East Region and is a member of the National Democratic Congress and the Member of Parliament for Bongo.

== Early life and education ==
Albert Abongo was born in 1959 at Gowrie-Bongo in the Upper East Region of Ghana. He holds a Bachelor of Science degree in civil engineering from the Kwame Nkrumah University of Science and Technology in 1986. He also attended University of Trondheim in Norway and studied Ports and Coastal Engineering in 1992. He worked as a civil engineer with the Ghana Ports and Harbours Authority prior to entering politics. He is a Christian and married with three children.

== Career ==
Abongo is an engineer by profession.

== Politics ==
Abongo is a member of the National Democratic Congress and was the Upper East Regional Minister. In February 2009, he was appointed Minister for Water Resources, Works and Housing by President Mills. He had a run of 4 terms in office as the member of the parliament representing the Bongo Constituency coming into office in January 2001. He was also a member of the committee on Health, House, Land and Forestry.

== Elections ==
Abongo was elected as the member of parliament for the Bongo constituency of the Upper East Region of Ghana for the first time in the 2004 Ghanaian general elections. He won on the ticket of the National Democratic Congress. His constituency was a part of the 9 parliamentary seats out of 13 seats won by the National Democratic Congress in that election for the Upper East Region. The National Democratic Congress won a minority total of 94 parliamentary seats out of 230 seats. He was elected with 17,397 votes out of 28,645 total valid votes cast. This was equivalent to 60.7% of total valid votes cast. He was elected over Abugre Felix of the Peoples’ National Convention, Andrews Awuni Aberibire of the New Patriotic Party and Amoro Mpuse of the Convention People's Party. These obtained 719, 10,311 and 218 votes respectively of total votes cast. These were equivalent to 2.5%, 36% and 0.8% respectively of total valid votes cast.

== Personal life ==
Abongo is a Christian.

Parliament of Ghana
| Preceded by Simon Alangde Asabo | Member of Parliament for Bongo; 2001 – present | Incumbent |
Political offices
| Preceded by Boniface Abubakar Saddique | Minister for Water Resources, Works and Housing; 2009 – present | Incumbent |
