= Gheysika Agambila =

Ghanaian politician and writer

Gheysika Adombire Agambila is a Ghanaian politician and a writer, who is from the town of Bolgatanga in the north-eastern province of Ghana. He is author of the novels Journey, Emigrant, and the children's book Solma, and the author of Nature's Tales. He also wrote three plays: Bolga the Madman, Neighbours, and Oh God, Give Me a New Life.

== Early life and education ==
Agambila was educated at Navrongo Senior High School and Achimota School. He continued his studies in the United States at Brandeis University (BA), the University of Rochester (MBA), and New York University (PhD). After several years working in the US, he returned to Ghana.

== Personal life ==
Agambila has been a Deputy Minister in the government of Ghana, serving in the Departments of Finance and Economic Planning, Ports and Railways, and Science and Environment. He was a lecturer at the University of Ghana School of Business and Senior Lecturer in Public Finance at the Ghana Institute of Management and Public Administration (GIMPA) and worked in economic consulting roles at Sierra Leone and the National Development Planning Commission of Ghana. He was a member of the Ghana Constitutional Review Board. He has also been the treasurer and vice president of the Ghana Writers Association (GAW).

== Career ==
During the presidency of John Agyekum Kufuor, Agambila was initially Deputy Minister of Finance between 2001 and April 2003, and from April 2003, Agambila became Deputy Minister of Ports, Harbours, and Railways. After Kufuor's re-election in 2004, Agambila was appointed Deputy Minister of Science and Environment in 2005.
