= Emmanuel Opam-Brown Akolbire =

Ghanaian politician (born 1960)

Hon. Emmanuel Opam-Brown Akolbire

Member of Parliament
- In office January 2005 – 2008
- President: John Kufuor
- Preceded by: David Apasara
- Constituency: Bolgatanga

Member of Parliament
- In office 7 January 2009 – 6 January 2013
- President: John Atta Mills
- Constituency: Bolgatanga
- Majority: NDC

Personal details
- Born: 15 November 1960 (age 65) Ghana
- Party: National Democratic Congress
- Children: 6
- Education: Vrije Universiteit Brussel
- Occupation: ICT Specialist

Emmanuel Opam-Brown Akolbire (born November 15, 1960) is a Ghanaian politician and former member of the Sixth Parliament of the Fourth Republic of Ghana who represented the Bolgatanga Central Constituency in the Upper East Region on the ticket of the National Democratic Congress.

== Early life and education ==
Akolbire was born on November 15, 1960. He hails from Daportindongo-Bolgatanga, a town in the Upper East Region of Ghana. He is a graduate of Vrije Universiteit Brussel and obtained his master's degree in Management Information System in 1998.

== Employment ==
Akolbire is ICT specialist by profession. He was an ICT Director of the Central Administration of the University of Development Studies in Tamale.

== Politics ==
Akolbire is a member of the National Democratic Congress (NDC). He was elected as member of the 5th Parliament of the 4th republic of Ghana to represent Bolgatanga Central Constituency in December 2008 and he assumed office in January 2009. He was elected with 28,656 votes out of 49,694 total valid votes cast, equivalent to 57.66% of total valid votes cast. He was elected over Mercy Alima Amusah A. of the New Patriotic Party, David Apasera of the People's National Convention, Anyema Robert Abiiro of Democratic People's Party, Awuni Atia Solomon of the Democratic People's Party and Evelyn Lamisi Anabila of the Convention People's Party. These obtained 20.25%, 20.14%, 0.46%, 0.20% and 1.29% respectively of total valid votes cast. In 2012, he contested for the re-election to become member of the sixth parliament of the fourth republic and won. He lost his polls in the 2016 General Elections and is staging a comeback in the December 2020 General Elections. He was member of committees on Employment, Social welfare and State and also Finance Committee.

== Personal life ==
Akolbire is a Christian (Catholic). He is married with six children.
