= Laliri George Maban =

Ghanaian politician

Hon. Laliri George Maban

Member of the Ghana Parliament for Wulensi Constituency
- In office 7 January 2013 – 6 January 2017
- Preceded by: Alhaji Saani Iddi
- Succeeded by: Thomas Donkor Ogajah

Personal details
- Born: 25 December 1954 (age 71) Ghana
- Party: National Democratic Congress
- Education: EP Training College, Bimbilla
- Occupation: Politician
- Profession: Teacher

Laliri George Maban (born 25 December 1954.) is a Ghanaian politician. He was the member of parliament for the Wulensi Constituency from 7 January 2013 to 6 January 2017.

== Early life and education ==
Maban was born on 25 December 1954. He hails from Wulensi in the Northern Region of Ghana. He studied at EP Training College, Bimbilla where he obtained his Teachers' Certificate 'A' in 1979.

== Career ==
Prior to entering politics, Maban was the District Co-ordinator of the Non-Formal Education Division (NFED) of the Ministry of Education in the Nanumba South District.

== Politics ==
Maban entered parliament on 7 January 2013 on the ticket of the National Democratic Congress. He represented the Wulensi Constituency from 2013 to 2017 after losing the seat to Thomas Donkor Ogajah of the New Patriotic Party during the 2016 Ghanaian general election. He polled 11,061 votes as against Ogajah's 14,950 votes.

In parliament, he has served on various committees, including the Standing Orders Committee and the Works and Housing Committee.

== Personal life ==
He is married with nine children. He identifies as a Christian and a member of the Catholic Church.

== Employment ==
- District Co-ordinating of NFED – Nanumba South District Wulensi
- Educationist
