= Boa Amponsem Senior High School =

Public co-educational senior high school in Dunkwa-on-Offin, Ghana

Location
- 5.96161°N 1.79222°W

Information
- School type: Senior high school
- Established: 1961; 65 years ago
- Gender: Mixed

Boa Amponsem Senior High School (formerly known as Dunkwa Secondary School) is a category B public co-educational senior high school located at Dunkwa-on-Offin in the Upper Denkyira East Municipality of the Central Region of Ghana.

== History ==
Boa Amponsem Senior High School (BOASS) was established in September 1961 by the Late Osagyefo Dr. Kwame Nkrumah, President of the First Republic of Ghana in appreciation to the Denkyira State as well as in support of his post-independence drive to expand access to secondary education through initiatives like the Ghana Education Trust, which funded the construction of numerous schools to promote national development and equity in education.

Later, in September 1976, the school was re-named Boa Amponsem Secondary School after Odeefoↄ Boa Amponsem III, one illustrious and famous Paramount Chief in the history of Denkyira.Following Ghana's 1987 educational reforms, which restructured the secondary education system into a three-year senior high school model, the institution was fully integrated into the national senior high school framework.

== School code ==
The Ghana Education Service has assigned the code 0031001 for administrative purposes, including student registrations, placements, and national examinations such as the West African Senior School Certificate Examination (WASSCE) to Boa Amponsem Senior High School.

== School motto ==
The official motto of Boa Amponsem Senior High School is Perseverance, Truth, Courage.

== Courses and extra-curricular activities ==
Boa Amponsem Senior High School functions within the standard three-year Senior High School (SHS) curriculum framework established by Ghana's National Council for Curriculum and Assessment (NaCCA). Currently, Boa Amponsem Senior High School runs sixprograms which include the following;

- General Science
- General Arts
- Agricultural Science
- Business
- Visual Arts
- Home Economics

Also, extra-curricular activities at BOASS include;

- Extracurricular Activities
- Sports
- Football
- Athletics
- Basketball
- Volleyball
- Cultural
- Dance Troupe
- Art Club
- School Choir
- Clubs
- Debating Club
- Science Club
- Drama Club
- Cadet Corps

== Facilities ==
Boa Amponsem Senior High School has the following facilities;

- Home Economics Laboratory
- Dining Hall
- Dormitories (Boys and Girls)
- Classrooms
- Science Laboratories
- Library
- ICT Lab
- Sports Field

== Achievements ==
Notable achievements of Boa Amponsem Senior High School include:

- National champions, Constitutional Games organized by the National Commission for Civic Education (NCCE) in 2003.
- 2005 Regional champions, Constitutional Games organized by the National Commission for Civic Education (NCCE)
- 2005 5th place, Constitutional Games organized by the National Commission for Civic Education (NCCE)
- Municipal champions in the 2014 Malaria Quiz Competition hosted by Perseus Mining Company Limited.
- Semi-finalist, 2020 Ghana National Science and Maths Quiz.
- 2020 Recipient of ‘Inner Strength’ award by Dano Milk.

== Notable alumni ==
Notable alumni of Boa Amponsem Senior High School include:

- Nana Amoakoh
- Hon. Emelia Ankomah Esq.
- Baba Jamal
