= Upper Denkyira West District =

- District
- Districts of Central Region

- Location of Upper Denkyira West District within Central
- Coordinates: 6°9′12.24″N 2°9′26.28″W
- Country: Ghana
- Region: Central
- Capital: Diaso

Government
  - District Chief Executive: Richmond Kodua
  - Member of Parliament: Rudolf Amoako-Gyamaah

Area
  - Total: 579.21 km^{2} (223.63 sq mi)

Population (2021)
  - Total: 91,025
- Time zone: UTC+0 (GMT)
- ISO 3166 code: GH-CP-UW
- Website: Official website

Upper Denkyira West District is one of the twenty-two districts in Central Region, Ghana. It was formerly part of the then larger Upper Denkyira District in 1988, which was created from the former Denkyira District Council, until the northwestern part of the district was split off to create Upper Denkyira West District on 29 February 2008; thus the remaining part was renamed as Upper Denkyira East District (which it was later elevated to municipal district assembly status on that same year to become Upper Denkyira East Municipal District). The district assembly is located in the northwestern part of Central Region and Diaso as its capital town.

== List of settlements ==
Settlements of Upper Denkyira West District (20 largest communities in the District and their population)
No.	Settlement	Population	Population year
1	Ayanfuri	4,660	2010
2	Diaso	4,492	2010
3	Dominase	2,993	2010
4	Nkotumso	2,955	2010
5	Ntom	2,891	2010
6	Maudaso	2203	2010
7	Bethlehem	1,999	2010
8	New Obuasi	1,546	2010
9	Nkronua Anaafo	1,531	2010
10	Akwaboso	1,455	2010
11	Afiefiso	1,397	2010
12	Besease	1,353	2010
13	Jameso Nkwanta	1,340	2010
14	Nyinawusu-Awiaso	1,334	2010
15	Ameyaw	1,214	2010
16	Ayanfuri-Gyaman	1,166	2010
17	Kwameprakrom	1,153	2010
18	Abora	1,078	2010
19	Treposo	1,069	2010
20	Bremang	995	2010

== Sources ==
- "Upper Denkyira West District". Statoids.
- District: Upper Denkyira West District
