= Samuel Nsowah-Djan =

Ghanaian politician (born 1961)

Hon. Samuel Nsowah-Djan MP

Member of the Ghana Parliament for Upper Denkyira West Constituency
- In office 7 January 2017 – 6 January 2021
- Preceded by: Hon. Benjamin Kofi Ayeh
- Succeeded by: Daniel Ohene Darko
- President: Nana Akuffo-Addo

Personal details
- Born: 26 June 1961 (age 65) Denkyira Breman, Ghana
- Party: New Patriotic Party
- Education: University of Ghana, University of Education, Winneba, University for Development Studies
- Occupation: Politician
- Profession: CEO, Tutor
- Committees: Privileges Committee

Samuel Nsowah-Djan is a Ghanaian politician and member of the Seventh Parliament of the Fourth Republic of Ghana representing the Upper Denkyira West Constituency in the Central Region on the ticket of the New Patriotic Party.

== Early life and education ==
Samuel was born on 26 June 1961. He hails from Denkyira Breman in the Central Region of Ghana. He graduated from the University of Ghana, Legon with a bachelor's degree in Sociology in 2005. He also holds a diploma from the University of Education, Winneba. He is currently undertaking an MPhil in Development Studies from the University for Development Studies.

== Career ==
Samuel was the headteacher at the Denkyira-Breman Anglican Basic School. He was also the CEO of Nsowah Mining Company Limited in Dunkwa-On-Offin.

== Politics ==
Samuel is a member of the New Patriotic Party. During the 2015 NPP parliamentary primaries, he contested and defeated the Incumbent Benjamin Kofi Ayeh.

=== 2016 election ===
During the 2016 Ghanaian general election, Samuel won the Upper Denkyira West Constituency parliamentary seat. He won with 16,881 votes making 61.3% of the total votes cast whilst the NDC parliamentary candidate Ambrose Amoah-Ashyiah had 10,655 votes making 38.7% of the total votes cast.

=== 2020 elections ===
Samuel lost the Upper Denkyira West Constituency parliamentary seat during the 2020 Ghanaian general election to the NDC parliamentary candidate Daniel Ohene Darko. He lost with 17,925 votes making 49.3% of the total votes cast whilst Daniel had 18,446 votes making 50.7% of the total votes cast.

=== Committee ===
Samuel was a member of the Privileges Committee.

== Personal life ==
Samuel is a Christian.

== Philanthropy ==
During the COVID-19 pandemic in Ghana, he presented items such as Veronica buckets, water basins, thermometer guns, hand sanitizers and other PPEs to the Upper Denkyira West District Health Directorate.

He built mechanized boreholes in Aburi, Gyaman and Kakyerenyansa.
