= Nanumba District =

- Former District
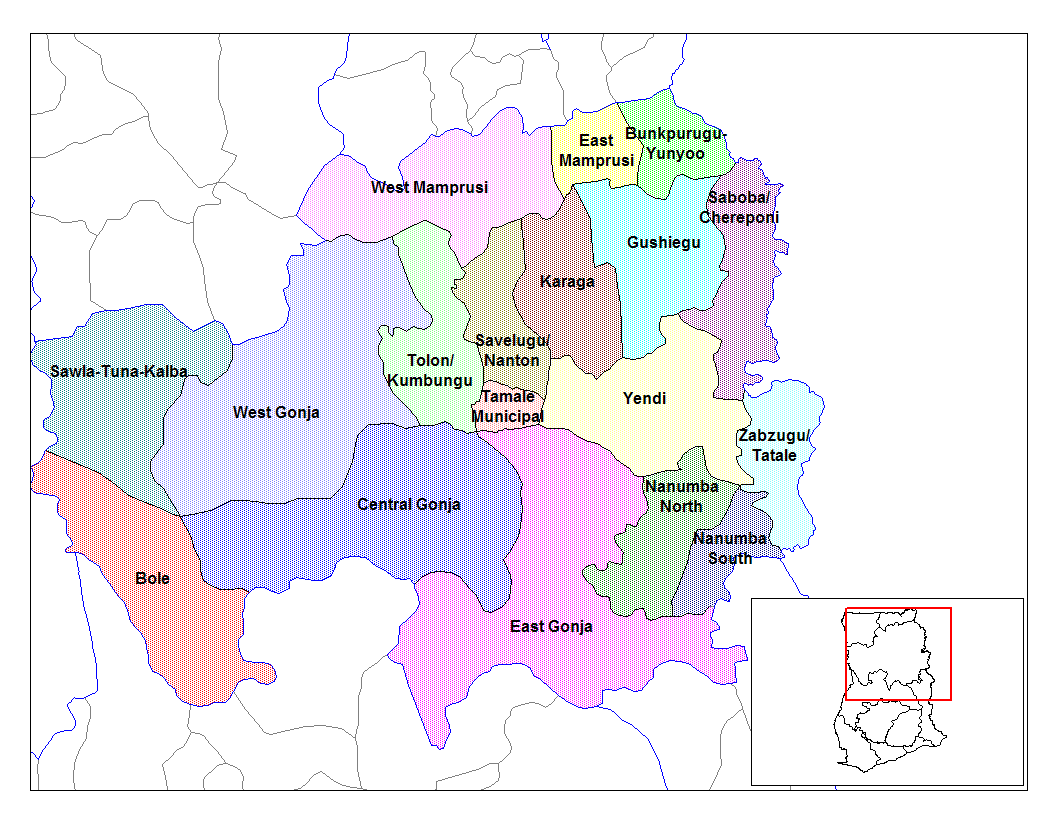
- Districts of Northern Region

- Location of Nanumba District within Northern
- Coordinates: 8°51′N 0°4′W
- Country: Ghana
- Region: Northern
- Capital: Bimbila

Population
  - Total: —
- Time zone: UTC+0 (GMT)
- ISO 3166 code: GH-NP-NM

Nanumba District is a former district that was located in Northern Region, Ghana. Originally created as an ordinary district assembly in 1988. However on 27 August 2004, it was split off into two new districts: Nanumba North District (which it was elevated to municipal district assembly status on 15 March 2018; capital: Bimbilla) and Nanumba South District (capital: Wulensi). The district assembly was located in the southern part of Northern Region and had Bimbilla as its capital town.

== See also ==
- "Districts of Ghana". Statoids.
