= Thomas Donkor Ogajah =

Ghanaian politician (born 1968)

Member of the Ghana Parliament for Wulensi Constituency

Personal details
- Born: 7 July 1968 (age 58) Nyakpayili, Ghana
- Party: New Patriotic Party
- Education: University of Education, Winneba

Thomas Donkor Ogajah (born 7 July 1968) is a Ghanaian politician and was a member of the Seventh Parliament of the Fourth Republic of Ghana representing the Wulensi constituency in the Northern Region on the ticket of the New Patriotic Party.

== Early life and education ==
Ogajah was born on 7 July 1968 at Nyakpayili, in the Wulensi district of Ghana. He is a product of University of Education, Winneba where he obtained a Diploma and a Bachelor of Education as well as a Teacher’s Cert A from E.P Teacher Training College, Bimbilla.

== Career ==
Before Ogajah was elected as a member of parliament, he was a headmaster at St Joseph J.H.S, Gumgumpa- Chamber in the Nanumba South District from 2005 to 2009.

== Politics ==
Ogajah is a member of the New Patriotic Party and a member of the Seventh Parliament of the Fourth Republic of Ghana representing the Wulensi constituency in the Northern Region of Ghana.

=== 2016 election ===
Ogajah contested the Wulensi constituency parliamentary seat on the ticket of the New Patriotic Party during the 2016 Ghanaian general election and won with 14,950 votes representing 48.84% of the total votes. He was elected over Laliri George Maban of the National Democratic Congress, Yakubu Limpu of the Progressive People's Party (PPP), Habib Tahid Damba (IND) and Mamani Wumbei Abdulai of the Convention People's Party. They obtained 11,061 votes, 4, 214 votes, 233 votes and 150 votes respectively, equivalent to 36.14%, 13.77%, 0.76 and 0.49% of the total votes respectively.

==== 2020 election ====
Ogajah again contested the Wulensi constituency parliamentary seat on the ticket of the New Patriotic Party during the 2020 Ghanaian general election but lost to Abukari Dawuni of the National Democratic Congress.
