= Festus Awuah Kwofie =

Ghanaian politician

Hon. Festus Awuah Kwofie Dr.
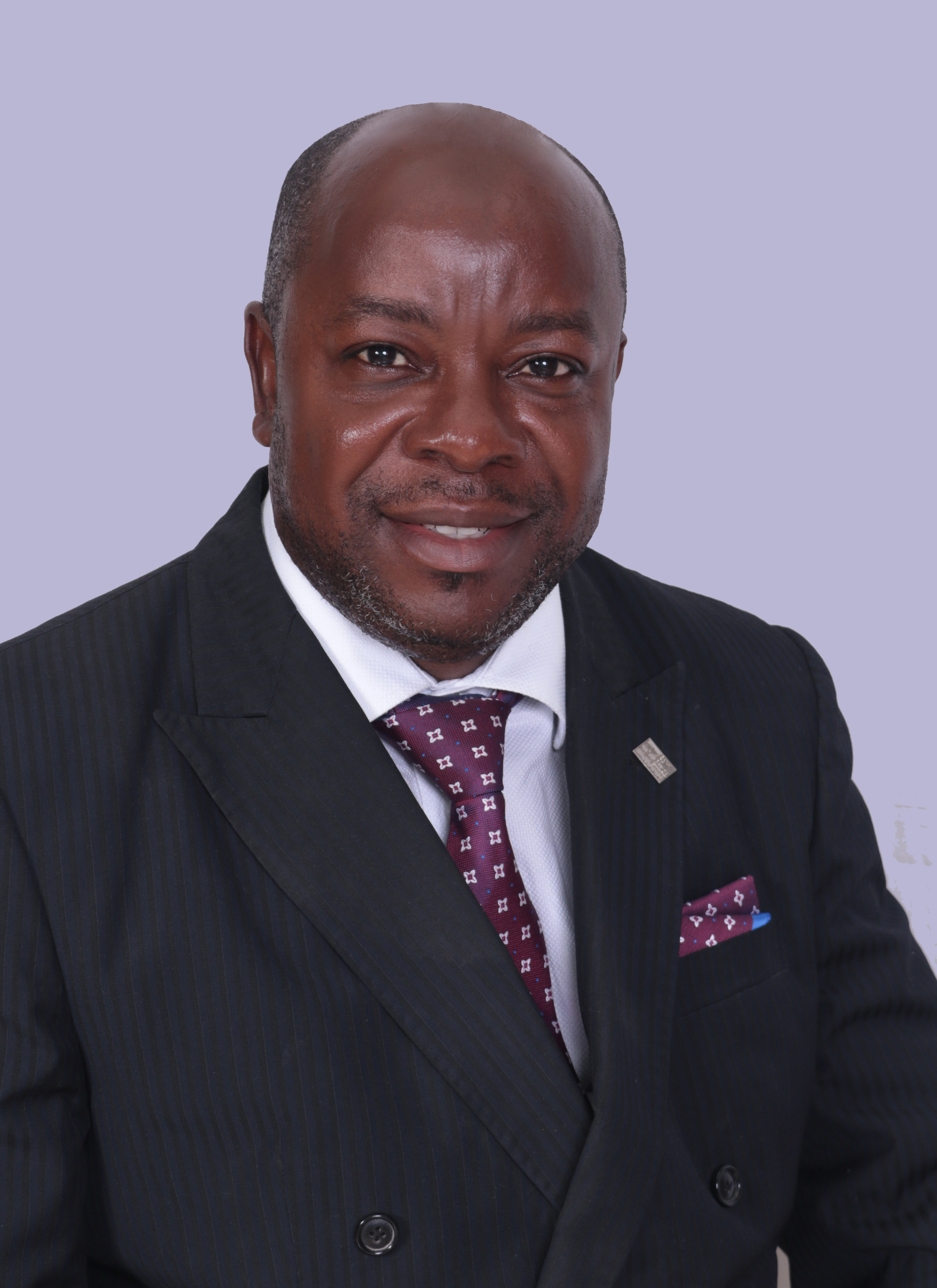

Member of the Ghana Parliament for Upper Denkyira East
- In office 7 January 2021 – 6 January 2025
- Preceded by: Nana Amoakoh
- Succeeded by: Emelia Ankomah

Personal details
- Born: Festus Awuah Kwofie; 8 January 1967 (age 59) Buabinso-Dunkwa-Offin, Ghana
- Party: New Patriotic Party
- Education: Fijai Secondary school, University of Ghana, University of Leicester, Swiss Business School
- Occupation: Politician
- Profession: CEO
- Committees: Gender and Children Committee (Vice Chairperson); Youth, Sports and Culture Committee

Dr. Festus Awuah Kwofie (born 8 January 1967) is a Ghanaian Politician. He was a member of the Eighth Parliament of the Fourth Republic of Ghana representing the Upper Denkyira East Constituency in the Central Region on the ticket of the New Patriotic Party(NPP).

== Early life and education ==
Festus was born on January 8, 1967. He hails from Buabinso-Dunkwa-Offin in the Central Region of Ghana. He had is secondary education at Tarkwa Secondary School and Fijai Secondary school in 1988. He is a graduate of University of Ghana and University of Leicester, where he obtained a Bachelor of Art Degree (Statistics, Economics AND Geography) in 1992 and a Masters in Business Administration) with Finance in 2003 respectively. He has Masters in Applied Business Research and post graduate certificate in Contemporary management in 2017 with the Swiss Business School in Zurich in Switzerland.

== Career ==
Festus was the CEO of Jeseque Company Limited. He was also the Director of Risk Management at the Bank of Africa, Ghana. He was also the Deputy Managing Director at Cocoa Merchant Limited. He was also the Chief Finance Officer at First African Group Limited.

== Politics ==
Festus is a member of the New Patriotic Party (NPP). In the June 2020 NPP parliamentary primaries, he contested and unseated the incumbent member of parliament Nana Amoako to represent the NPP in the 2020 Ghanaian general election. He currently a Board Member of the Ghana Shippers Authority.

=== 2020 elections ===
In the 2020 Ghanaian general elections, he won the Upper Denkyira East Constituency parliamentary seat with 26,771 votes making 54.76% of the total votes cast whilst the NDC parliamentary candidate Emelia Ankomah had 22,121 votes making 45.24% of the total votes cast, the GUM parliamentary candidate Christiana Asante had 337 votes making 0.7% of the total votes cast, the PNC parliamentary candidate Amaniampong Owusu Offin had 0 vote making 0.0% of the total votes cast and the PPP parliamentary candidate Fredrick Enchile had 0 vote making 0.0% of the total votes cast.

=== Committees ===
He served as the Vice Chairperson of the Gender and Children Committee and also a member of the Youth, Sports and Culture Committee respectively in the Eighth Parliament of the Fourth Republic of Ghana. He was also a member of the AD-HOC Committee that would appoint an Auditor to audit the Auditor-General.

== Personal life ==
Festus is a Christian.
