= Nana Amoakoh Gyampa =

Ghanaian politician (born 1958)

Hon. Nana Amoakoh Gyampa MP

Member of the Ghana Parliament for Upper Denkyira East Constituency
- In office 7 January 2005 – 6 January 2017
- Succeeded by: Festus Awuah Kwofie

Personal details
- Born: 15 March 1958 (age 68) Denkyira-Akropong, Ghana
- Party: New Patriotic Party
- Children: 3
- Education: Boa Amponsem Senior High School, York College
- Occupation: Politician
- Profession: Psychologist
- Committees: Parliamentary Select Committee on Works and Housing (Chairman)

Nana Amoakoh Gyampa (born March 15, 1958) is a Ghanaian politician and medical doctor. He is a member of the Seventh Parliament of the Fourth Republic of Ghana representing the Upper Denkyira East Constituency in the Central Region on the ticket of the New Patriotic Party.

== Early life and education ==
Amoakoh was born on 15 March 1958 and hails from Denkyira-Akropong in the Central Region of Ghana. He had his secondary education at the Boa Amponsem Senior High School. He attended the York College and graduated with a bachelor's degree in psychology.

== Career ==
Amoakoh is a Psychologist and a businessman. He became a member of the Parliament of Ghana in 2005.

== Politics ==
He is a member of the New Patriotic Party. In 2005, he became a member of the parliament of Ghana. In 2020 during the NPP primaries, he lost his bid to represent the Upper Denkyira East in parliament to Festus Awuah Kwofie in the 2020 general election.

=== 2004 elections ===
In the 2004 Ghanaian general election, he won the Upper Denkyira East Constituency parliamentary seat with 21,440 votes making 68.10% of the total votes cast whilst the NDC parliamentary candidate Kojo Adjepong Afrifah had 6,433 votes making 20.40% of the total votes cast, the CPP parliamentary candidate Beatrice Buadu had 304 votes making 1.00% of the total votes cast, the PNC parliamentary candidate Amaniampong Owusu Offin had 270 votes making 0.90% of the total votes cast and an Independent parliamentary candidate Carl Ebo Morgan had 3,047 votes making 9.70% of the total votes cast.

=== 2008 elections ===
In the 2008 Ghanaian general election, he again won the Upper Denkyira East Constituency parliamentary seat with 17,416 votes making 59.17% of the total votes cast whilst the NDC parliamentary candidate Peter Kofi Owusu-Ahia Jnr had 5,721 votes making 19.44% of the total votes cast, the CPP parliamentary candidate Yaw Asamoah had 5,994 votes making 20.36% of the total votes cast, the PNC parliamentary candidate Amaniampong Owusu Offin had 215 votes making 0.73% of the total votes cast and the DFP parliamentary candidate Augustina Ampong had 89 votes making 0.30% of the total votes cast.

=== 2012 elections ===
In the 2012 Ghanaian general election, he again won the Upper Denkyira East Constituency parliamentary seat with 21,020 votes making 53.98% of the total votes cast whilst the NDC parliamentary candidate Dr Mark Kurt Nawaane had 17,319 votes making 44.47% of the total votes cast, the PPP parliamentary candidate Alex Nkansah had 484 votes making 1.24% of the total votes cast, the PNC parliamentary candidate Amaniampong Owusu Offin had 88 votes making 0.23% of the total votes cast and the NDP parliamentary candidate Peter Oliver Seim had 31 votes making 0.08% of the total votes cast.

=== 2016 elections ===
In the 2016 Ghanaian general election, he again won the Upper Denkyira East Constituency parliamentary seat with 22,212 votes making 55.69% of the total votes cast whilst the NDC parliamentary candidate Emelia Ankomah had 16,297 votes making 40.9% of the total votes cast, the CPP parliamentary candidate Yaw Asamoah had 810 votes making 2.0% of the total votes cast, the PNC parliamentary candidate Amaniampong Owusu Offin had 61 votes making 0.2% of the total votes cast, an Independent parliamentary candidate Patrick Adu had 233 votes making 0.6% of the total votes cast and the PPP parliamentary candidate Fredrick Enchil had 275 votes making 0.7% of the total votes cast.

=== Committee ===
He is the former Chairman of the Parliamentary Select Committee on Works and Housing.

== Personal life ==
Amoakoh is a Christian. He is married with three children.

== Philanthropy ==
Amoakoh presented a corn mill, flour mix machine, roller, oven and a lester machine to Boa Amponsem Senior High School in the Central Region of Ghana.
