= Joseph Rockson =

Ghanaian politician

Joseph Manboah Rockson is a Ghanaian politician and a member of the National Democratic Congress of Ghana.

== Political life ==
Rockson twice contested the Nkwanta North constituency in northern part Volta Region but lost on both times. He contested the Member of Parliament (MP) for the Bimbilla constituency in the Northern Region of Ghana in 2016 and lost to the incumbent Dominic Nitiwul.
