= Daniel Ohene Darko =

Ghanaian politician

Hon. Daniel Ohene Darko MP
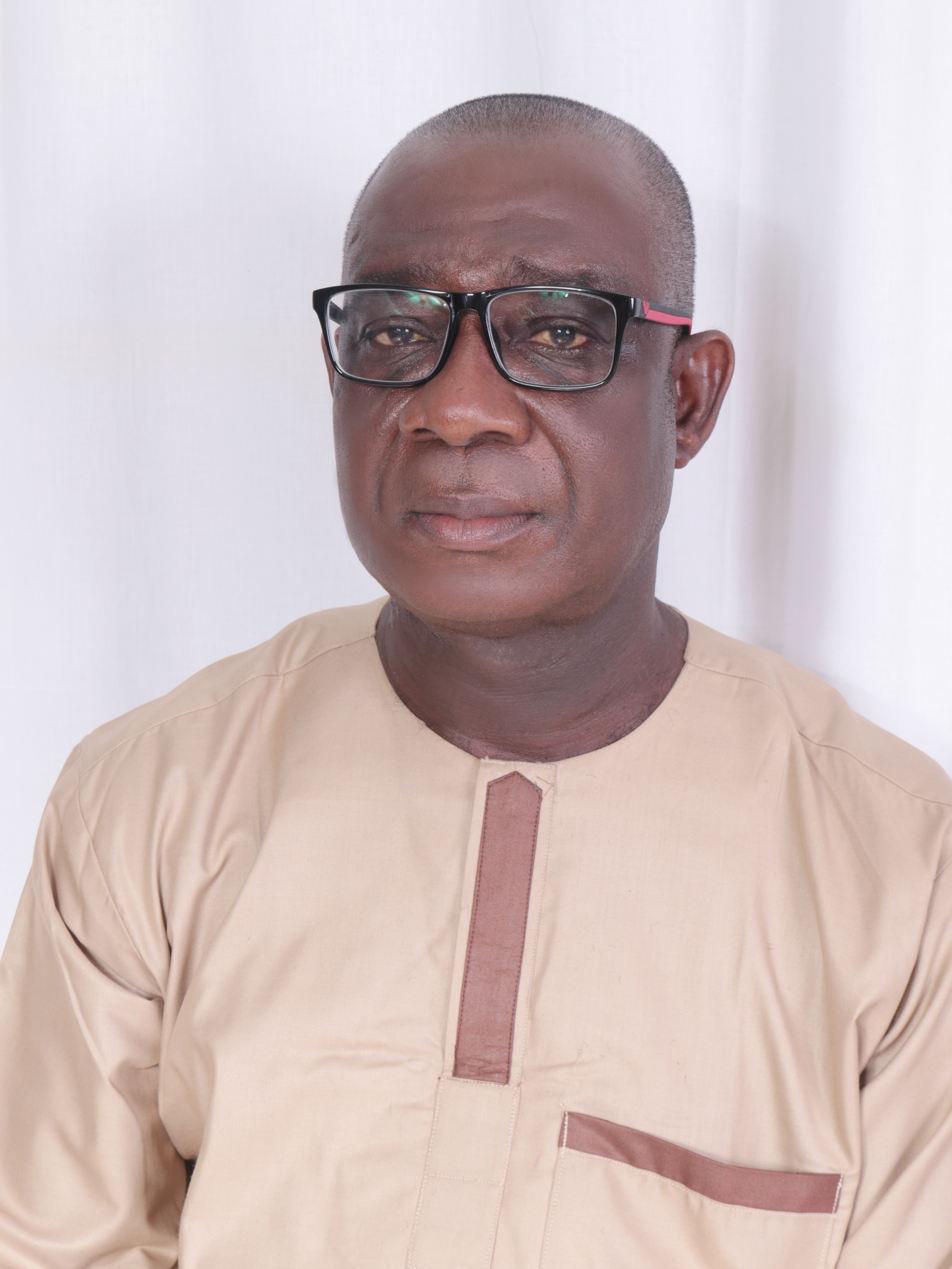

Member of Parliament for Upper Denkyira West Constituency
- Incumbent
- Assumed office 7 January 2021
- President: Nana Akuffo Addo
- Preceded by: Samuel Nsowa-Djan

Personal details
- Born: 18 June 1961 (age 65) Ayanfuri, Ghana
- Party: National Democratic Congress
- Occupation: Politician
- Profession: Lawyer
- Committees: Youth, Sports and Culture Committee; Poverty Reduction Strategy Committee

Daniel Ohene Darko (born 18 June 1961) is a Ghanaian politician who currently serves as the Member of Parliament for the Upper Denkyira West Constituency.

== Early life and education ==
Daniel Ohene Darko was born on 18 June 1961 and hails from Ayanfuri in the Central Region of Ghana. He obtained his Senior Secondary Certificate Examination (SSCE) in 1977. He also obtained his Ordinary Level in 1977 and Advanced Level in 1983. He proceeded in having his Bachelor of Laws (Law) from 2001 to 2003, Barrister of Law in 2003 and Executive Master of Business Administration(EMBA) – Marketing in 2011.

== Career ==
Daniel Ohene Darko worked as an Associate of a Law Firm "Kwasi Blay and Associates" in Ghana. He again worked at Amicus Legal Consult (Partner) in Ghana. He is the Managing Partner of Betta Law Consult. He is currently working as the Member of Parliament (MP) for Upper Denkyira West Constituency in the Central Region of Ghana on the ticket of the National Democratic Congress.

== Political life ==
Daniel Ohene Darko contested and won the NDC parliamentary primaries for Upper Denkyira West Constituency in the Central Region of Ghana. He won the Upper Denkyira West Constituency parliamentary seat in the 2020 Ghanaian general elections on the ticket of the National Democratic Congress with 18,446 votes making 50.7% of the total votes cast to join the Eighth (8th) Parliament of the Fourth Republic of Ghana against Samuel Nsowah-Djan of the New Patriotic Party who had 17,925 votes making 49.3% of the total votes cast.

=== Committees ===
Daniel Ohene Darko is a member of the Youth, Sports and Culture Committee and also a member of the Poverty Reduction Strategy Committee.

== Personal life ==
Daniel Ohene Darko is a Christian.
