= Bimbilla (Ghana parliament constituency) =

Ghana parliament constituency

- constituency for the Parliament of Ghana
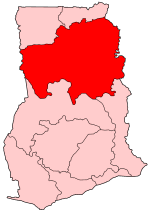
- District: Nanumba North District
- Region: Northern Region of Ghana

Current constituency
- Party: New Patriotic Party
- MP: Dominic Nitiwul

Bimbilla is one of the constituencies represented in the Parliament of Ghana. It elects one Member of Parliament (MP) by the first past the post system of election. Bimbilla is located in the Nanumba North district of the Northern Region of Ghana. Hon. Dominic Nitiwul represented the constituency in the 3rd, 5th, 6th, 7th, 8th and 9th Parliament of the Fourth Republic of Ghana.

== Boundaries ==
The seat is located entirely within the Nanumba North district of the Northern Region of Ghana.

== Members of Parliament ==
Election	Member	Party
1992	Mohamed Ibn Chambas	National Democratic Congress
1996	George Mpambi Dagmanyi	People's National Convention
2000	Mohamed Ibn Chambas	National Democratic Congress
2002	Dominc Aduna Bingab Nitiwul	New Patriotic Party
2004	Mohammed Ibn Abass	National Democratic Congress
2008	Dominc Aduna Bingab Nitiwul	New Patriotic Party
2016	Dominic Nitiwul	New Patriotic Party
2020	Dominic Nitiwul	New Patriotic Party

== Elections ==
The following table shows the parliamentary election results for Bimbilla constituency in the 1996 Ghanaian general election.

1996 Ghanaian parliamentary election: Bimbilla Source:National Electoral Commission, Ghana
Party	Candidate	Votes	%	±%
People's National Convention	George Mpambi Dagmanyi	13,796	32.10	—
Convention People's Party	Aliu Aduna Mahama	9,467	22.10	—
National Democratic Congress	Mohammed Ibn Chambas	7,488	17.40	—
NCP	Justice K Grundow	418	1.00	—
Majority		13,796	32.10	—

2000 Ghanaian parliamentary election: Bimbilla Source:Adam Carr's Election Archives
Party	Candidate	Votes	%	±%
National Democratic Congress	Mohamed Ibn Chambas	18,611	61.2	—
New Patriotic Party	Mohammed A. Wumbei	9,117	30.0	—
National Reform Party	Iddi Aziz Iddisah	1,840	6.1	—
Convention People's Party	Kinjas S Sulemana	363	1.2	—
People's National Convention	Nakugli Fusheini Mular	278	0.9	—
United Ghana Movement	Baba A Fusheini	175	0.6	—
Majority		9,494	31.2	—

Bimbilla by-election, 2002, (Note: Dominc Aduna Bingab Nitiwul (NPP) won the by-election on 14 March 2002, after Mohamed Ibn Chambas had vacated the seat to take up his new job as the Executive Secretary of the Economic Community of West African States.) Source:Ghana Home Page
Party	Candidate	Votes	%	±%
New Patriotic Party	Dominc Aduna Bingab Nitiwul	16,658	62.0	+32.0
National Democratic Congress	Mohammed Ibn Abass	9,037	33.6	−27.6
People's National Convention	Andrew Ngoma	605	2.3	+1.4
Independent	Iddi Aziz	269	1.0	—
Democratic People's Party	Ibn Aziz Abass (DPP)	154	0.6	—
Great Consolidated Popular Party	Abdulai Yusif	144	0.5	—
Majority		7,621	28.4	−2.8

2004 Ghanaian parliamentary election: Bimbilla Source:National Electoral Commission, Ghana
Party	Candidate	Votes	%	±%
National Democratic Congress	Mohammed Ibn Abass	19,577	51.9	+18.3
New Patriotic Party	Dominic Bingab Nitiwul	15,791	41.9	−20.1
People's National Convention	Andrew Nogma	1,564	4.1	+1.8
Convention People's Party	Ibn Aziz Abass	781	2.1	—
Majority		3,786	10.0	−18.4
Turnout		39,792	90.0	

The table below shows the parliamentary election results for Bimbilla constituency in the 2008 Ghanaian parliamentary election.

MPs elected in the Ghanaian parliamentary election, 2008, Source:Ghana Home Page
Party	Candidate	Votes	%	±%
New Patriotic Party	Dominic Nitiwul	27,195	61.80	—
National Democratic Congress	Mohammed Ibn Abass	16,005	36.37	—
Democratic People's Party	Mohammed Ibn Illiasu	391	0.89	—
People's National Convention	Wahab A Mohammed	292	0.66	—
DFP	David Beso	123	0.28	—
Majority		27,195	61.80	—

The below table shows the parliamentary results for Bimbilla constituency in the 2012 Ghanaian general election.

MPs elected in the Ghanaian parliamentary election, 2012, Source:Ghana Home Page
Party	Candidate	Votes	%	±%
New Patriotic Party	Dominic Nitiwul	30,521	58.69	—
National Democratic Congress	Mohammed Ibn Abass	17,034	32.75	—
Progressive People's Party	Iddisah Zaharatu	2,136	4.11	—
IND	Mohammed Sadick	1,982	3.81	—
Convention People's Party	Alhassan Somed Dasana	186	0.36	—
National Democratic Party	Abdul Hafiz Imoro	96	0.18	—
Progressive People's Party	Rashid Abdul Rahaman	52	0.10	—
Majority		30,521	58.69	—

The table below shows the parliamentary results for Bimbilla constituency in the 2016 Ghanaian general election.

2016 Ghanaian parliamentary election: Bimbilla Source:National Electoral Commission, Ghana
Party	Candidate	Votes	%	±%
New Patriotic Party	Dominic Nitiwul	29,827	57.73	&mdash
National Democratic Congress	Joseph Kwabena Manboah- Rockson	17,918	34.68	&mdash
Progressive People's Party	Iddisah Zaharatu	2,905	5.62	&mdash
Convention People's Party	Alhassan Somed Dasana	1, 013	1.96	—
Majority		29,827	57.73	&mdash

This table shows the parliamentary election results for Bimbilla constituency in the Northern region during the 2020 Ghanaian general election.

2020 Ghanaian general election: Bimbilla Source:National Electoral Commission, Ghana
Party	Candidate	Votes	%	±%
New Patriotic Party	Dominic Nitiwul	40,023	57.69	&mdash
National Democratic Congress	Mahamadu Attah Nantogmah	27,796	40.07	&mdash
Progressive People's Party	Zakaria Sulemana	663	0.96	&mdash
GUM	Daniel Ndagbalan Gmabi	517	0.75	—
Convention People's Party	Alhassan Somed Dasana	372	0.54	—
Majority		40,023	57.69	&mdash

== See also ==
- List of Ghana Parliament constituencies
