= Wulensi (Ghana parliament constituency) =

Constituency in Ghana

- constituency for the Parliament of Ghana
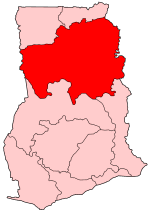
- District: Nanumba South District
- Region: Northern Region of Ghana

Current constituency
- Party: Independent
- MP: Nandaya Yaw Stanley

Wulensi is one of the constituencies represented in the Parliament of Ghana. It elects one member of parliament (MP) by the first-past-the-post system of election. Nandaya Yaw Stanley is the member of parliament for the constituency. Wulensi is located in the Nanumba South district of the Northern Region of Ghana.

== Boundaries ==
The seat is located entirely within the Nanumba South district of the Northern Region of Ghana.

== Members of Parliament ==
Election	Member	Party
1992		National Democratic Congress
1996	Alhaji Saani Iddi	New Patriotic Party
2000	Samuel Nyimakan	National Democratic Congress
2002	Wumbei Kofi Karim	New Patriotic Party
2008	Alhaji Saani Iddi	Independent
2012 Ghanaian general election	Thomas Donkor Ogajah	New Patriotic Party
2020 Ghanaian general election	Abukari Dawuni	National Democratic Congress

Following the death of the independent MP Alhaji Saani Iddi in early June 2012, the Electoral Commission of Ghana set 31 July 2012 as the date for a by-election following registration of candidates on 3 July and 4 July 2012.

== Elections ==
The below table is the parliamentary election results for the Wulensi constituency in the 2020 Ghanaian general election.

2020 Ghanaian general election: Wulensi Source:Adam Carr's Election Archives
Party	Candidate	Votes	%	±%
National Democratic Congress	Abukari Dawuni	20,148	50.77	—
New Patriotic Party	Thomas Donkor Ogajah	19,184	48.25	—
GUM	Moses Mukambe Nyilkajer	238	0.60	—
L.P.G	Zakaria Mohammed	150	0.38	—
Majority		20,148	50.77	—

The table below shows the parliamentary election results for Wulensi constituency during the 2016 Ghanaian general election.

2016 Ghanaian parliamentary election: Wulensi Source:Adam Carr's Election Archives
Party	Candidate	Votes	%	±%
New Patriotic Party	Thomas Donkor Ogajah	14,950	48.84	—
National Democratic Congress	Laliri George Maban	11,061	36.14	—
Progressive People's Party	Yakubu Lumpu	4,214	13.77	—
IND	Habib Tahid Damba	233	0.76	—
Convention People's Party	Mamani Wumbei Abdulai	150	0.49	—
Majority		14,950	48.84.1	—

2008 Ghanaian parliamentary election: Wulensi Source:Ghana Home Page
Party	Candidate	Votes	%	±%
Independent	Alhaji Saani Iddi	10,174	37.1	—
New Patriotic Party	Thomas Donkor Ogajah NPP	8,538	31.1	−15.3
National Democratic Congress	Laliri George Maban	8,335	30.4	−13.3
Convention People's Party	Musah Ziblim Star Boy	196	0.7	−0.2
People's National Convention	Thomas Muyabi	171	0.6	—
Majority		1,636	6.0	3.3
Turnout		—	—	—

2004 Ghanaian parliamentary election: Wulensi Source:National Electoral Commission, Ghana
Party	Candidate	Votes	%	±%
New Patriotic Party	Wumbei Kofi Karim	10,476	46.4	−4.1
National Democratic Congress	Laliri George Maban	9,864	43.7	−1.3
People's National Convention	Daniel Okpanul	881	3.9	+1.9
Democratic People's Party	Dawuda Mumuni	287	1.3	−0.1
Convention People's Party	Alhaji Musah Ziblila	207	0.9	—
Majority		612	2.7	−1.8
Turnout		23,754	89.0	+30.9

Wumbei Kofi Karim (NPP), a teacher, won the by-election held on 4 March 2002 with a majority of 894 following the disqualification of the incumbent MP, Samuel Nyimakan of the NDC by the Supreme Court of Ghana on 15 January 2003.

Wulensi by-election, 2002 Source:Ghana Home Page
Party	Candidate	Votes	%	±%
New Patriotic Party	Wumbei Kofi Karim	8,197	50.5	+11.2
National Democratic Congress	Sadani Njigur	7,303	45.0	−9.4
People's National Convention	Daniel Okpanul Niwubni	319	2.0	—
Democratic People's Party	Dawuda Mumuni	227	1.4	—
Independent	Alhaji Ziblila Musah	75	0.5	—
Every Ghanaian Living Everywhere	Inusah Natogmah	56	0.3	—
Independent	Peter Maagan Oggah	53	0.3	—
Majority		894	4.5	−10.6
Turnout		16,798	58.1	—

2000 Ghanaian parliamentary election: Wulensi Source:Adam Carr's Election Archives
Party	Candidate	Votes	%	±%
National Democratic Congress	Samuel Nyimakan	9,537	54.4	—
New Patriotic Party	Alhaji Saani Iddi	6,884	39.3	—
National Reform Party	Binyam S Jangboja	837	4.8	—
Convention People's Party	Ayi Abdu-Rahaman	278	1.6	—
Majority		2,653	15.1	—

== See also ==
- List of Ghana Parliament constituencies
