= Benjamin Kofi Ayeh =

Ghanaian politician (born 1962)

Hon. Benjamin Kofi Ayeh

Member of the Ghana Parliament for Upper Denkyira West
- In office 7 January 2013 – 6 January 2017
- President: John Mahama
- Succeeded by: Samuel Nsowah-Djan

Member of Parliament for Upper Denkyira West Constituency
- In office 7 January 2009 – 6 January 2013
- President: John Atta Mills; John Mahama

Member of Parliament for Upper Denkyira West Constituency
- In office 7 January 2005 – 6 January 2009
- President: John Kufuor

Personal details
- Born: 16 November 1962 (age 63)
- Party: New Patriotic Party
- Education: Ghana Institute of Management of Public Administration
- Profession: Accountant

Benjamin Kofi Ayeh (born 16 November 1962) is a businessman, a Ghanaian politician and an accountant. He was a member of parliament for the Sixth Parliament of the Fourth Republic of Ghana and the Fourth Parliament of the fourth Republic of Ghana. He represented the Upper Denkyira West in the Central region of Ghana.

== Early life and education ==
Benjamin Kofi Ayeh was born on 16 November 1962 in Ayanfuri in the Central region. He had his Charted Accountant (Ghana) Intermediate in the year 1986 and obtained his EMGL in the year 2008 from Ghana Institute of Management and Public Administration. He is also a qualified chartered accountant.

== Career ==
Benjamin Kofi Ayeh worked with Fambenycold Limited, Accra as the chief executive officer (CEO). He was a Member of Parliament for the Upper Denkyire West Constituency in the Central Region of Ghana on the ticket of the New Patriotic Party for the fourth parliament of the fourth republic of Ghana in the 2004 Ghanaian general elections. He is a businessperson, an accountant and a politician. He was also a former deputy minority chief whip.

== Politics ==
Benjamin Ayeh was a former deputy minority chief whip and a member of the New Patriotic Party. In 2004, he contested in the Ghanaian general elections under the ticket of the New Patriotic Party and won the seat for member of parliament of the Upper Denkyira West constituency, for the fourth parliament of the fourth republic of Ghana.

=== 2004 Elections ===
In the 2004 Ghanaian general elections, Ayeh obtained 12,177 votes outs of the 18,017 total valid votes cast. This represented 67.6% of the total votes cast. He was elected over Oduro-Bonsu Kwaku of the National Democratic Congress and Thomas Maxwell Aidoo of the Convention People's Party. These obtained 30.2% and 2.2% respectively of the total valid votes cast. Ayeh's constituency was a part of the 16 constituencies won by the New Patriotic Party in the Central region in that elections. In all, the New Patriotic Party won a total 128 parliamentary seats in the 4th parliament of the 4th republic of Ghana.

=== 2008 Elections ===
Ayeh was re-elected as the member of parliament in the 2008 Ghanaian general elections for the Upper Denkyira West constituency. He thus represented the constituency in the 5th parliament of the 4th republic of Ghana. He was elected with 9,339 votes out of 18,183 total valid votes cast. This was equivalent to 51.36% of the total valid votes cast. He was elected over Yankey M. Ackah of the National Democratic Congress, George Mensah of the Democratic Freedom Party and Dr. Thomas Maxwell Aidoo of the Convention People's Party. These obtained 38.45%, 0.46% and 9.73% of the total valid votes cast. Ayeh was re-elected on the ticket of the New Patriotic Party. His constituency was a part of 8 constituencies won by the New Patriotic Party in the Central region in that elections. In all, the New Patriotic Party won a total 107 parliamentary seats in the 5th parliament of the 4th republic of Ghana.

=== 2012 Elections ===
He contested in the 2012 Ghanaian general elections and was re-elected to serve his second term as the member of parliament for the sixth parliament of the fourth republic of Ghana for the Upper Denkyira West constituency.

== Personal life ==
Benjamin Kofi Ayeh is married. He is a Christian and he fellowships at the Church of Jesus Christ of Latter Day Saints.
