= Upper Denkyira East Municipal District =

- Municipal District
- Districts of Central Region

- Location of Upper Denkyira East Municipal within Central
- Coordinates: 5°58′0.12″N 1°46′59.88″W
- Country: Ghana
- Region: Central
- Capital: Dunkwa-On-Offin
- Established: 14 October 2021

Government
  - Municipal Chief Executive: Ebenezer Forson Appiah

Population (2021 census)
  - Total: 110,141
- Time zone: UTC+0 (GMT)
- ISO 3166 code: GH-CP-UE
- Website: udema.gov.gh

Upper Denkyira East Municipal District is one of the thirty-three districts in Central Region, Ghana. Originally it was formerly part of the then-larger Upper Denkyira District in 1988, which was created from the former Denkyira District Council, until the northwest part of the district was split off to create Upper Denkyira West District on 29 February 2008; thus the remaining part has been renamed as Upper Denkyira East District, which it was later elevated to municipal district assembly status on that same year to become Upper Denkyira East Municipal District. The municipality is located in the northwest part of Central Region and has Dunkwa-On-Offin as its capital town.

== List of settlements ==
Settlements of Upper Denkyira East Municipal Assembly
No.	Settlement	Population	Population year
1	Acquakrom		
2	Akropong		
3	Asikuma		
4	Abesewa		
5	Meretweso		
6	Buabin		
7	Buabinso		
8	Opponso		
9	Dunkwa-on-Offin	32,626	2012
10	Kyekyewere		
11	Mfuom		
12	Mmradan		
13	Babianiha		
14	Kubi		
15	Esaase		
16	Sobroso		
17	Amisah		
18	Kwameprakrom		
19	Pokukrom		

== Sources ==
- "Upper Denkyira East Municipal District". Statoids.
- District: Upper Denkyira East Municipal District
