= Dominic Nitiwul =

Ghanaian politician

Hon. Dominic Nitiwul MP
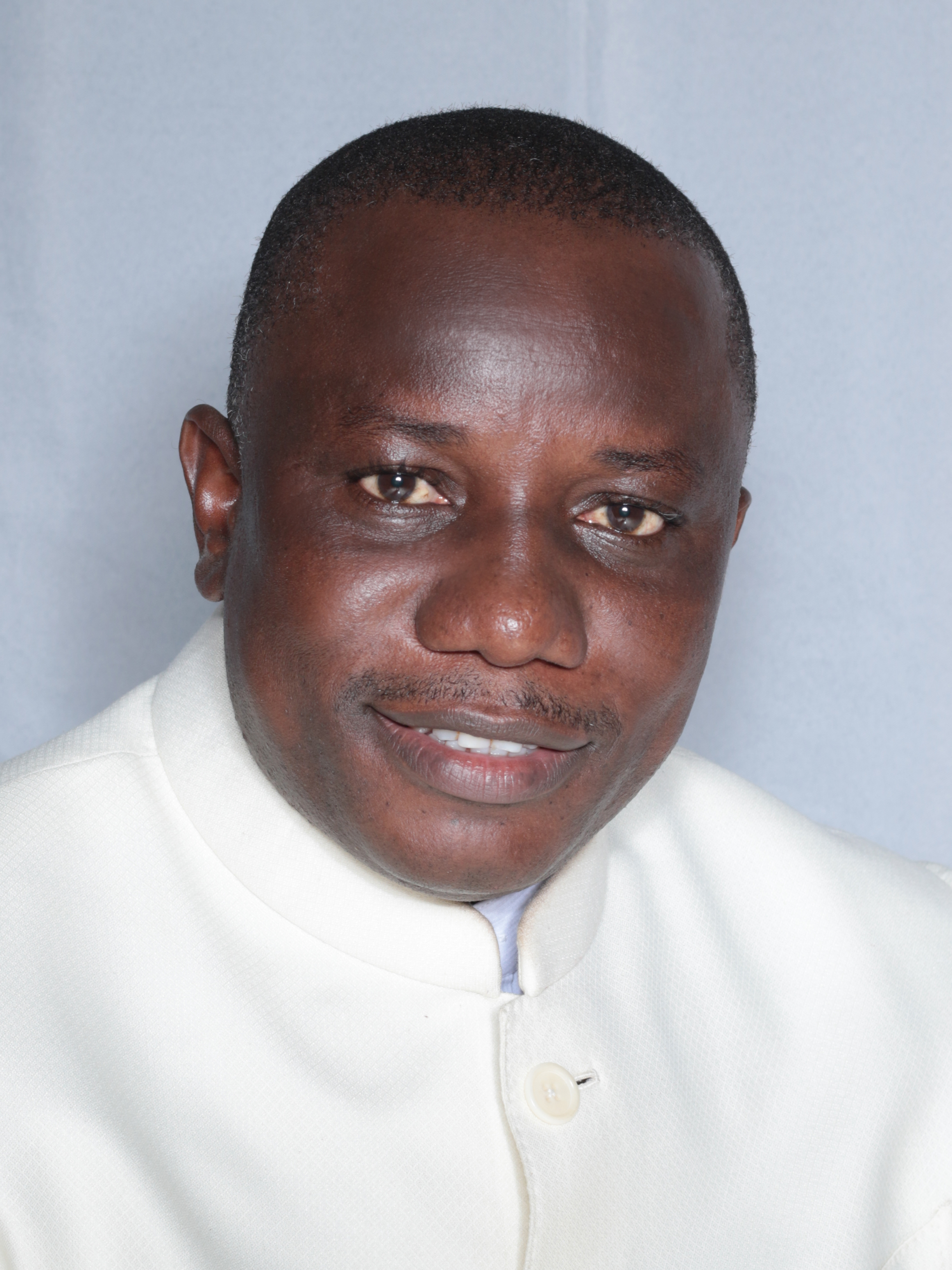
- Dominic Nitiwul in 2020

Minister of Defence
- In office February 2017 – January 2025
- President: Nana Akuffo-Addo
- Preceded by: Benjamin Kunbuor
- Succeeded by: Edward Omane Boamah

MP for Bimbilla
- Incumbent
- Assumed office February 2005
- President: Nana Akuffo-Addo

Personal details
- Born: Dominic Aduna Bingab Nitiwul; 4 November 1977 (age 48) Chamba Ghana
- Party: New Patriotic Party
- Children: 5
- Education: St Charles Secondary and Seminary School, University of South Wales, University of Westminster
- Occupation: Member of Parliament, Minister

Dominic Aduna Bingab Nitiwul (born 4 November 1977) is a Ghanaian politician and a Member of Parliament (MP) for the Bimbilla constituency in the Northern Region of Ghana. He has also served in the Pan-African Parliament. Nitiwul has held the office of Minister of Defence of Ghana from February 2017 to January 2025.

== Early life and education ==
Dominic Nitiwul studied in various educational institutions in Ghana, Germany, and the United Kingdom. Dominic completed his O level at St Charles Secondary and Seminary School in 1992. In Germany he earned certificates in conflict prevention (2003) and conflict management (2005) from the International Academy for Leadership. He obtained his Master of Business Administration in finance from the University of South Wales, and a Master of Laws in corporate finance from the University of Westminster.

== Politics ==
=== Member of Parliament ===
Nitiwul was elected to the parliament of Ghana in 2002 at the age of 25. In his victory speech, he alluded to the fact that he wanted to be graded on the level of peace he would bring to the constituency. This was due to the protracted tribal dispute between the Konkomba people and the Nanumba people. He has served on many committees in both the Ghanaian parliament and the Pan-African Parliament. These include: Finance Committee, Monetary and Financial Affairs Committee, Business Committee, Appointment Committee, Youth and Sports Committee, Roads and Transport Committee, and Education Committee. He was the Deputy Minority Leader of the Ghanaian Parliament from 2012 to 2016.

==== 2016 Parliamentary election ====
Nitiwul won the 2016 Parliamentary elections for his constituency by defeating the National Democratic Congress candidate Dr Joseph Mamboah Rockson. Prior to the elections Nitiwul had announced that he would win due to the fact that his opponent was not a native of the constituency and was not abreast with what was happening in the constituency; he also cited the numerous developmental projects he had undertaken. His opponent opined that Nitiwul had served for far too long and believed the constituents needed a new face.

==== Developmental projects ====
Nitiwul has embarked on developmental projects in Bimbilla to better the lot of his constituents. He had 69 boreholes drilled in various communities in his constituencies, and got the Northern Electricity Distribution Company to extend electricity to 16 communities. He built two clinics, twelve roads projects, and classroom blocks.

== Minister of Defence ==
On 13 January 2017, Nitiwul was part of the first group of ministers designate nominated by President Nana Akuffo-Addo. His nomination was for the Ministry of Defence. This was done after his party, the New Patriotic Party, had won power in the 2016 Ghanaian general election. Nitiwul was approved for the ministry by members of the Ghanaian parliament, along with eight others. His oath of office was administered by President Akuffo-Addo on 27 January 2017. on the list presented to parliament for approval on 21 January 2021, Mr. Nitiwul was nominated by the president to maintain his ministerial position as the minister of Defence.

=== Galamsey fight ===
Nitiwul has made the fight against illegal mining as one of his main objectives as Minister of Defence. Illegal operators mine for precious metals in various parts of Ghana with little or no regard for the environment. Several bodies of water in the country have dried up due to the environmental degradation caused by the mining, and drinking water has been polluted with harmful chemicals such as cyanide. Previous governments had tried and failed to curb the illegal mining due to a lack of concerted effort. Working with the military high command of the Ghana Armed Forces and the Ministry of Lands and Natural Resources, Nitiwul helped roll out measures to seize machinery, drive out the miners, and restore degraded lands in the country.

=== Mob justice fight ===
When Major Maxwell Mahama was lynched in May 2017, Nitiwul promised that a thorough investigation would be initiated to identify and arrest the culprits. Mahama had been mistaken for an armed robber and lynched by some inhabitants of Diaso.

=== Cabinet Minister ===
In May, 2017, President Nana Akufo-Addo named Dominic Nitiwul as part of nineteen ministers who would form his cabinet. The names of the 19 ministers were submitted the Parliament of Ghana and announced by the Speaker of the House, Rt. Hon. Prof. Mike Ocquaye. As a Cabinet minister, Nitiwul is part of the inner circle of the president and is to aid in key decision-making activities in the country.

== Personal life ==
Nitiwul is married with five children.

Political offices
Preceded by Benjamin Kunbuor	Minister of Defence; Ghana; 2017–2025	Succeeded by Edward Omane Boamah
