= Diaso Senior High School =

Location
- P. O. Box 13, Dunkwa-on-Offin; Diaso; Central Region; Diaso; Ghana
- Coordinates: 6.148586000000°N 2.147973000000°E

Information
- School type: Public High School coeducational
- Motto: Hardwork, perseverance and success
- Established: 1991
- Status: active
- Oversight: Ministry of Education
- School code: 1030011002
- Gender: Unisex
- Age: 14 to 20
- Classes offered: Home Economics, General Science, General Arts, Business, Agriculture

Diaso Senior High School is a co-educational day/ boarding second cycle school situated in Diaso in the Upper Denkyira district in Central Region of Ghana.

== Courses ==
The school offers courses in General Science, General Arts, Business, Home Economics and Agriculture.
