= Mohamed Ibn Chambas =

Ghanaian lawyer, politician and diplomat

His Excellency, Dr. Mohamed Ibn Chambas
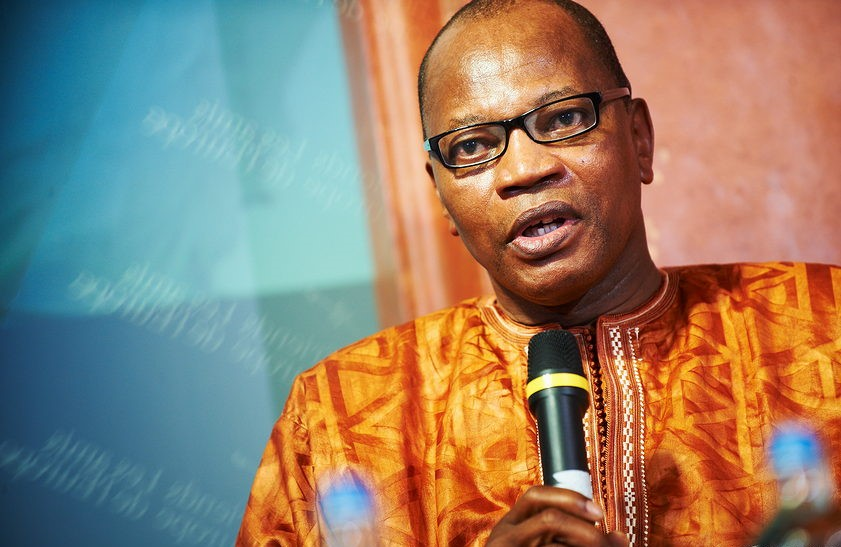
- Mohamed Ibn Chambas

UN Special Rep. of the Secretary-General for West Africa and the Sahel
- In office September 2014 – April 2021
- Preceded by: Said Djinnit
- Succeeded by: Mahamat Saleh Annadif

UN Special Rep. of the Secretary-General for Darfur & Head of the Joint United Nations-African Union Mission to Darfur
- In office December 2012 – September 2014
- Preceded by: Ibrahim Gambari

Secretary-General of the African, Caribbean and Pacific Group of States
- In office 1 March 2010 – December 2012
- Preceded by: Sir John Kaputin

1st President of the ECOWAS Commission
- In office January 2007 – February 2010
- Succeeded by: James Victor Gbeho

Personal details
- Born: 7 December 1950 (age 75)
- Party: National Democratic Congress
- Spouse: Khadija Ibn Chambas
- Children: 2 (daughter, son)
- Education: University of Ghana (B.A. 1973); Cornell University (M.A. 1977, PhD 1980); Case Western Reserve University (J. D. 1984)
- Occupation: Lawyer; lecturer; school administrator

Mohamed Ibn Chambas (born 7 December 1950 in Bimbilla, Ghana) is a Ghanaian lawyer, diplomat, politician and academic who has served as an international civil servant since 2006. He last served as the United Nations Special Representative of the Secretary-General for West Africa and the Sahel, and the former head of UNOWAS from April 2014 to April 2021. Previously, he served as the UN SRSG and Head of the Joint UN-AU Peacekeeping Mission in Darfur (2012-2014), the Secretary-General of the African, Caribbean and Pacific Group of States (2010-2012) and the president of the Economic Community of West African States (ECOWAS, 2006–2009).

== Early life and education ==
He attended Mfantsipim School, Cape Coast, and Government Secondary School, now Tamale Secondary School Tamale. He holds degrees in political science from University of Ghana, Legon (B.A. 1973) and Cornell University Ithaca, New York (M.A. 1977, PhD 1980). He has a Juris Doctor law degree from Case Western Reserve University, Cleveland, Ohio. He was admitted to practice law in Ghana and the State of Ohio.

== Career ==
His working in the United States includes teaching at Oberlin College, Ohio, and practising law with the Legal Aid Society of Cleveland and the Cleveland, Ohio, Law Office of Forbes, Forbes and Teamor. He returned to Ghana, where he became a school administrator.

== Politics ==
=== Deputy Foreign Secretary ===
Chambas first entered government in 1987 as Deputy Foreign Secretary of Ghana. He was a member of the Head of State's summit delegations to a number of countries, including the US, China, UK, France, Malaysia, Nigeria, and Zimbabwe. He led Ghana's delegation to the UN General Assembly, ministerial meetings of the OAU and the Economic Community of West African States (ECOWAS), the Non-Aligned Movement, and the Commonwealth.

=== MP 1993–1997 ===
He served as MP for Bimbilla from January 1993 to January 1997 on the ticket of the National Democratic Congress. He was First Deputy Speaker of the Ghanaian Parliament (1993–1994), and thereafter was appointed Deputy Foreign Minister. As First Deputy Speaker, he was Chairman of the Appointments and Privileges Committees of Parliament. In 1993–94, he chaired the Foreign Affairs Committee of Parliament with oversight responsibility for the Ministry of Foreign Affairs.

=== Civil War mediator ===
Chambas came to international importance as mediator between the parties of the First Liberian Civil War of the 1990s, and later the Ivorian Civil War in the early 2000s. Centrally involved in the ECOWAS mediation efforts in Liberia, he directly participated in negotiations leading to the agreements ending the Liberian civil war.

In the interim, Chambas lost his Parliamentary seat in 1996, and the then government of President Jerry Rawlings removed him from the foreign ministry and put him in charge of Ghana's primary education system.

=== Deputy Minister of Education ===
Between April 1997 and December 2000, Chambas was appointed the Deputy Minister of Education in charge of tertiary education. In that capacity, he had direct responsibility for the country's five universities, 10 polytechnics and agencies/institutions charged with formulation of policies on higher education, accreditation and maintenance of standards in tertiary institutions.

Chambas was involved in reform of tertiary education which included diversification of funding, cost sharing, the introduction of the Ghana Education Trust Fund, aimed to improve the quality and financial standing of tertiary institutions. He also led negotiations and conflict resolution processes during student protests and industrial disputes involving university and polytechnic teachers and other staff members. Chambas was at the time suggested in the Ghanaian press as a candidate for the New Patriotic Party (NPP).

Chambas greets US officials 2007

=== Return to parliament ===
Regaining his seat in 2000, he was also a member of the Commonwealth Ministerial Action Group, which worked to facilitate a transition to constitutional democratic governance in Nigeria, Sierra Leone and the Gambia.

He was reelected on 7 December 2000 on the ticket of the National Democratic Congress. Shortly thereafter, he was nominated to head ECOWAS by Ghanaian President John Kufuor. In 2002, he was the Ranking Member on the Parliamentary Select Committee on Foreign Affairs of the Minority National Democratic Congress. He was also a member of the Select Committee on Education and the Committee on Subsidiary legislation.

== Diplomatic career ==
=== ECOWAS ===
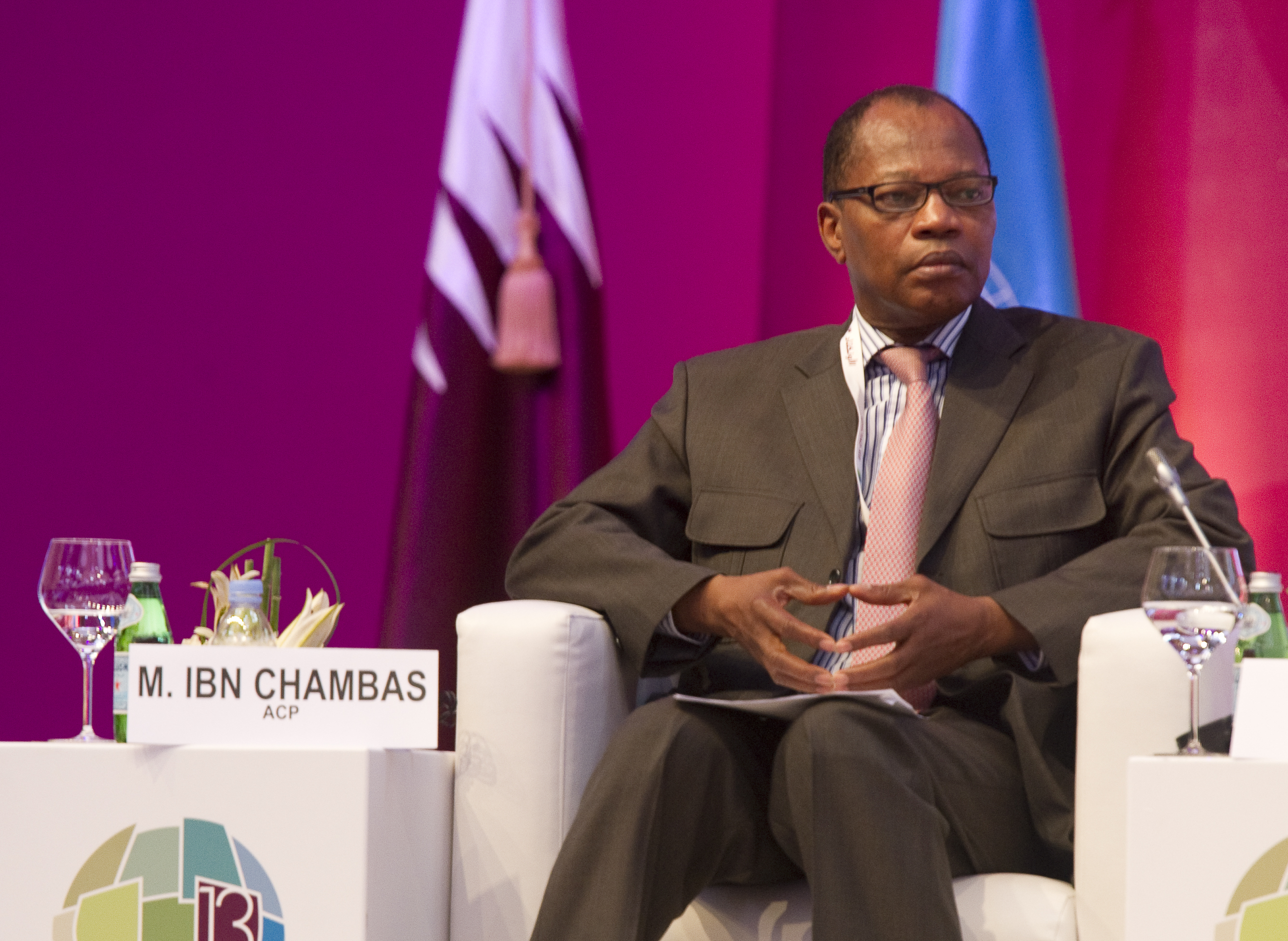
Chambas at UNCTAD XIII

In 2001, Chambas was elected as the Executive Secretary of the Economic Community of West African States (ECOWAS), and acceded to the office on 1 February 2002. As Executive Secretary of ECOWAS, he was chief executive of the 15-person Executive Secretariat of the international organisation from 2002 to 2006.

=== United Nations ===
On 20 December 2012, Chambas was appointed as Joint Special Representative for Darfur and Head of the United Nations–African Union Mission in Darfur (UNAMID) by the United Nations Secretary-General Ban Ki-moon and African Union Commission Chairperson Nkosazana Dlamini-Zuma. He succeeded Ibrahim Gambari of Nigeria.

On 12 September 2014, he was appointed Special Representative of the Secretary-General and Head of the United Nations Office for West Africa and the Sahel (UNOWA). He left office in April 2021, with Mahamat Saleh Annadif replacing him.

Parliament of Ghana
New title	Member of Parliament for Bimbilla; 1993–1997	Succeeded by Mpambi Dagmanyi
Preceded by Mpambi Dagmanyi	Member of Parliament for Bimbilla; 2001–2002	Succeeded by Dominc Aduna Bingab Nitiwul^{1}
Political offices
Preceded by Lansana Kouyaté	Executive Secretary of the Economic; Community of West African States; 2002–2006	Succeeded by Post ended
New title	President of the ECOWAS Commission; 2007–2010	Succeeded by James Victor Gbeho
Preceded by John Kaputin	Secretary-General of the ACP Group of States; 2010–2012	Succeeded by Muhammad Mumuni^{2}
Notes and references
1. NPP Wins Bimbilla Bye-Elections; 2. ECOWAS endorse Mumuni as General-Secretary of ACP
