= Abukari Dawuni =

Ghanaian politician

Hon. Abukari Dawuni
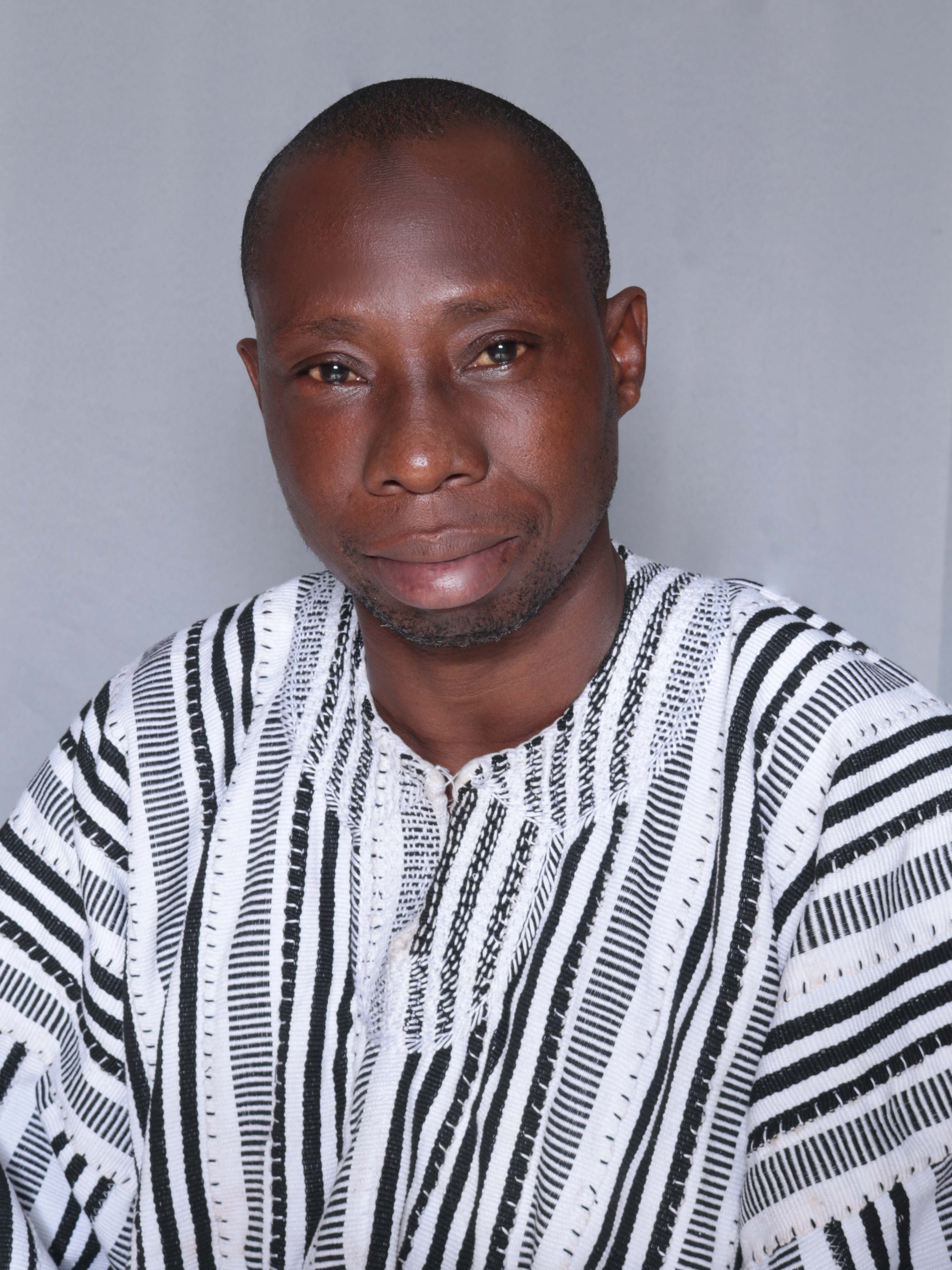

Member of Parliament for Wulensi Constituency
- Incumbent
- Assumed office 7 January 2021
- Preceded by: Alhaji Saani Iddi

Personal details
- Born: Abdulai Abanga; 27 January 1977 (age 49) Wulensi, Ghana
- Party: National Democratic Congress (Ghana)
- Occupation: Politician
- Committees: Youth, Sports and Culture Committee, Poverty Reduction Strategy Committee

Abukari Dawuni (born 27 January 1977) is a Ghanaian politician who is a member of the National Democratic Congress. He was the member of parliament for the Wulensi Constituency in the Northern Region of Ghana

== Early life and education ==
Dawuni was born in Wulensi, He holds a BA in Admin (Management Technology)

== Personal life ==
Dawuni is a muslim.
