= Bimbilla Senior High School =

High school in Ghana

Coordinates: 8.8628°N 0.0525°E

Bimbilla Senior High School is the only second cycle co-educational institution located in the Nanumba North Municipal District of the northern region of Ghana as of 2018.

== History ==
The school was established in 1981 through the request by the Bimbilla Community under the leadership of the former Member of Parliament (M.P) during the Liman’s regime for the Bimbilla Constituency and former Principal of the E.P College of Education, Bimbilla, Mr. Adam Marshall Adu. The school was sited in the premises of the then Bimbilla Central Junior Secondary School and also formerly, the Bimbilla Central Middle School in the nineteen sixties (1960s).lt is a category c school under the Ghana Education placement program.lt is also a mixed for both boys and girls.lt has a day and boarding school.

== Enrollment ==
As of 2025, Bimbilla Senior High School currently has a population of 1,614 students.

== Mission ==
The school states that its mission is to provide an environment that supports teaching and learning, and to prepare well-rounded graduates by having its teachers train students in discipline.

== Vision ==
The school's stated mission is to be a provider of senior high school education to BECE graduates who will be equipped with knowledge and competencies for life after school.

== Motto ==
Peace, Knowledge, Service

== Programs ==
1. General Arts
2. General Science
3. Business
4. Home Economics
5. Agriculture

== Student Houses ==
- Tingbani house
- Naa Abarika house
- Jilo naa Zakaria house

== Headmasters ==
- Mohammed Yakubu Mustapha
