= George Mpambi Dagmanyi =

Ghanaian politician

Member of parliament for Bimbila Constituency
- In office 7 January 1997 – 6 January 2001
- President: John Jerry Rawlings

Personal details
- Born: Bimbila, Northern Region, Ghana
- Party: People's National Convention
- Occupation: Politician

George Mpambi Dagmanyi is a Ghanaian politician and a member of the Second Parliament of the Fourth Republic representing the Bimbilla Constituency in the Northern Region of Ghana.

== Early life ==
He was born in Bimbilla in the Northern Region of Ghana.

== Politics ==
He was first elected into Parliament on the ticket of the People's National Convention for the Bimbilla Constituency in the Northern Region of Ghana in the December 1996 Ghanaian general election. He polled 13,796 votes out of the 31,169 valid votes cast representing 32.10% over Aliu Aduna Mahama of the Convention People's Party who polled 9,467 votes representing 22.10%, Mohammed Ibn Chambas of the National Democratic Congress who polled 7,488 votes representing 17.40% and Justice K. Grundow of the National Congress Party who polled 418 votes representing 1.00%.

He was defeated by Mohamed Ibn Chambas of the National Democratic Congress in the 2000 General Elections.
