= United Nations Office for West Africa and the Sahel =

- Abbreviation: UNOWAS
- Formation: 2016
- Type: UN Special Political Mission
- Parent organization: United Nations Department of Political and Peacebuilding Affairs
- Website: https://unowas.unmissions.org/en

The United Nations Office for West Africa and the Sahel (abbreviated as UNOWAS) is a United Nations political mission in Dakar, Senegal established in 2002 for preventive diplomacy, political mediation, and facilitation in West Africa and the Sahel. It is managed by the United Nations Department of Political and Peacebuilding Affairs

== Founding ==
In a letter to the UN Secretary-General on 28 January 2016, the Secretary Council requested the Office of the Special Envoy for the Sahel (OSES) and the United Nations Office for West Africa (UNOWA) to merge into a single entity, UNOWAS: the United Nations Office for West Africa and the Sahel. The merger intends to craft synergies to better engage with the countries of West Africa and the Sahel.

On 12 February 2016, Mohamed Ibn Chambas assumed the functions of Special Representative of the United Nations Secretary-General for West Africa and the Sahel (SRSG), while Ms. Hiroute Guebre Sellassie became Deputy Special Representative (DSRSG).

== Mission ==
UNOWAS has the responsibility for preventive diplomacy, good offices and political mediation and facilitation efforts in West Africa and the Sahel. UNOWAS also works to consolidate peace and democratic governance in countries emerging from conflict or political crises.

UNOWAS works closely with the African Union, ECOWAS, the Mano River Union, the Lake Chad Basin Commission, the Gulf of Guinea Commission, the G5 Sahel, as well as other regional partners to support regional solutions to cross-cutting threats to peace and security, such as terrorism and violent extremism, transnational organized crime, piracy and maritime insecurity.

UNOWAS assists regional institutions and member states to enhance their capacities to promote good governance and respect for the rule of law, human rights and the mainstreaming of gender in conflict prevention.

UNOWAS leads the implementation of the United Nations Integrated Strategy for the Sahel, endorsed by the Security Council in June 2013. The strategy includes a range of programs and initiatives in the areas of Governance, Security and Resilience.

== Bakassi dispute mediation ==
The Special Representative of the Secretary-General (SRSG) of UNOWAS chairs the Cameroon–Nigeria Mixed Commission (CNMC), which was established to facilitate the implementation of the 2002 ruling of the International Court of Justice (ICJ) on the Cameroon–Nigeria boundary dispute. The mandate of the Mixed Commission includes supporting the delimitation and demarcation of the 2,001 km-long land boundary and maritime boundary between the two countries, facilitating withdrawal and transfer of authority along the boundary, addressing the situation of the affected populations and supporting confidence-building measures. Resolutions and agreements on the four sections of the ICJ ruling have been reached, including the withdrawal and transfer of authority in the Lake Chad area (December 2003), along the land boundary (July 2004), and in the Bakassi peninsula (June 2006).

The peaceful completion of the transfer of authority in Bakassi from Nigeria to Cameroon, in August 2008, marked a critical milestone in the implementation of the ICJ ruling and the peaceful resolution of the boundary dispute between the two countries. Physical demarcation of the boundary has been hampered by the insecurity in border areas, in particular the violence related to the ongoing Boko Haram insurgency.

== Special Representative of the UN Secretary-General ==
Mohamed Ibn Chambas, April 2014 – April 2021

Mahamat Saleh Annadif, April 2021 –
