= Chamba (Ghana) =

Town in the Northern Region, Ghana

Coordinates: 8°42′N 0°08′W

Chamba is a town in the Northern Region of Ghana.

== Notable sons ==
- Dominic Nitiwul - Minister of Defence of Ghana.
