= Hiroute Guebre Sellassie =

Ethiopian diplomat and UN official

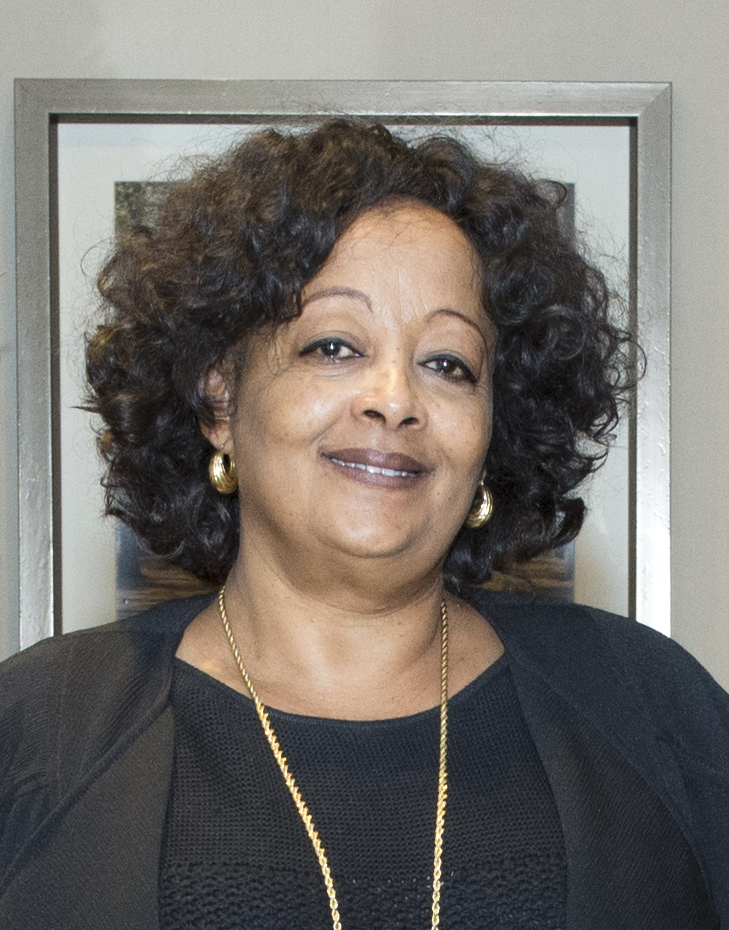
- Guebre Sellassie in 2015

Deputy Special Representative for West Africa and the Sahel
- In office 12 February 2016 – 6 August 2017
- Secretary-General: Ban Ki-moon; António Guterres
- Preceded by: Position established
- Succeeded by: Ruby Sandhu-Rojon

Special Envoy and Head of Office for the Sahel
- In office 1 May 2014 – 12 February 2016
- Secretary-General: Ban Ki-moon
- Preceded by: Romano Prodi
- Succeeded by: Position dissolved

Director of the Political Affairs Division and Head of the Goma Regional Office for the MONUSCO
- In office 2007–2014

Personal details
- Born: 1952 (age 73–74) Ethiopia
- Children: 3
- Occupation: Diplomat; lawyer; humanitarian

Hiroute Guebre Sellassie (born 1952) is an Ethiopian diplomat and human rights lawyer. She has held several senior portfolios in the United Nations, most recently serving as the Deputy Special Representative (DSRSG) for the Office for West Africa and the Sahel during 12 February 2016 to 6 August 2017. She was previously appointed the Special Envoy of the Secretary-General and Head of Office for the Sahel on 1 May 2014 by United Nations Secretary-General Ban Ki-moon, succeeding Romano Prodi of Italy, who completed his assignment on 31 January 2014.

== Early life and education ==
Guebre Sellassie attended a French-language secondary school in Addis Abbaba, Ethiopia. She completed a degree in law at the Sorbonne (Panthéon-Assas University).

== Career ==
Upon completing her studies in Paris, Guebre Sellassie returned to Addis Abbaba, where she had a distinguished career practicing law and held positions at the Ministry of Foreign Affairs within the Ethiopian government. Actively opposed the dictatorial regime of Mengistu Haile Mariam, she was imprisoned for five years, from age 25 to 30.

From 1998 to 2004, she held the position of Chief Executive Officer of the African Women Committee on Peace and Development, established jointly by the Economic Commission for Africa and the African Union to serve as an advisory organ on women's involvement in peace and security issues. She was then the Oxfam Regional Peace Building and Conflict Management Advisor for Horn, East and Central Africa.

=== MONUC/MONUSCO ===
In 2007, Guebre Sellassie was appointed Director of the Political Affairs Division and Head of the Goma Regional Office for the United Nations Mission in the Democratic Republic of Congo (MONUC), renamed United Nations Organization Stabilization Mission in the Democratic Republic of the Congo (MONUC) in 2010.

Following the Kiwanja Massacre in November 2008, Guebre Sellassie and Gen. Bipin Rawat, the recently appointed military head of the UN peacekeeping force in North Kivu, brought their commands together for evaluation. As a result, the MONUC civilian and military teams in North Kivu "implemented a number of reforms that drastically improved the performance of peacekeepers and were hailed as a model for other peacekeeping missions." Reforms included the creation of joint protection teams comprising military and police personnel and civil affairs, human rights, and child protection staff operating from the UN's forward bases; a mobile-phone based early warning system, in which community members were provided with devices to alert peacekeepers of unrest; community alert networks that allowed for bases to be contacted around the clock; Community Liaison Assistants (CLAs), an expanded role for Congolese translators to also act as community monitors and information gatherers; an emphasis on civilian outreach; increased foot patrols, including escorting women to their homes and workplaces and issuing security advisories in high-risk areas; and deployment of 30–35 troop standing combat units to areas deemed vulnerable.

=== OSES ===
Guebre Sellassie was appointed as Special Envoy of the Secretary-General (SESG) and Head of Office for the Sahel by Secretary-General Ban Ki-moon on 1 May 2014.

== Personal life ==
Guebre Sellassie is married and has three children.
