= Denkyira District =

Denkyira District Council
- Former District Council
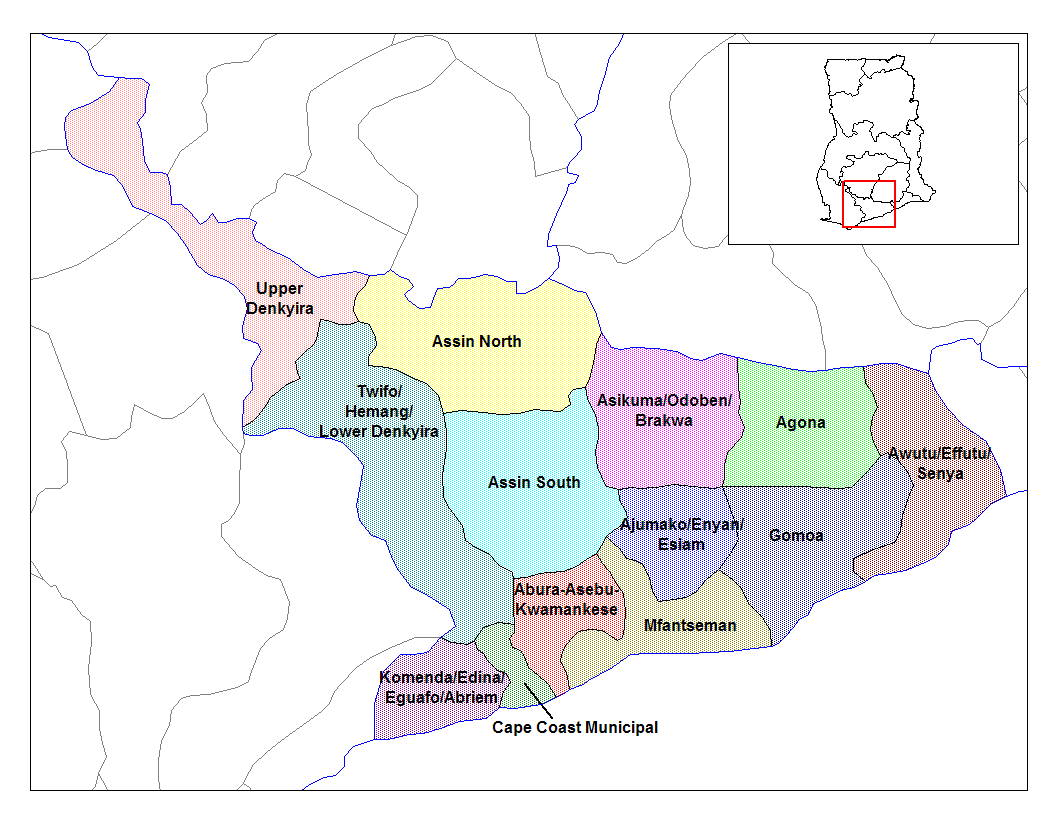
- Districts of Central Region

- Location of Denkyira District Council within Central
- Coordinates: 5°58′0.12″N 1°46′59.88″W
- Country: Ghana
- Region: Central
- Capital: Dunkwa-On-Offin
- Time zone: UTC+0 (GMT)
- ISO 3166 code: GH-CP-__

Denkyira District is a former district council that was located in Central Region, Ghana. Originally created as a district council in 1975, it was split off into two new district assemblies in 1988: Upper Denkyira District (capital: Dunkwa-On-Offin) and Twifo/Heman/Lower Denkyira District (capital: Twifo Praso). The district council was located in the northwest part of Central Region and had Dunkwa-On-Offin as its capital town.
