= Upper Denkyira District =

- Former District
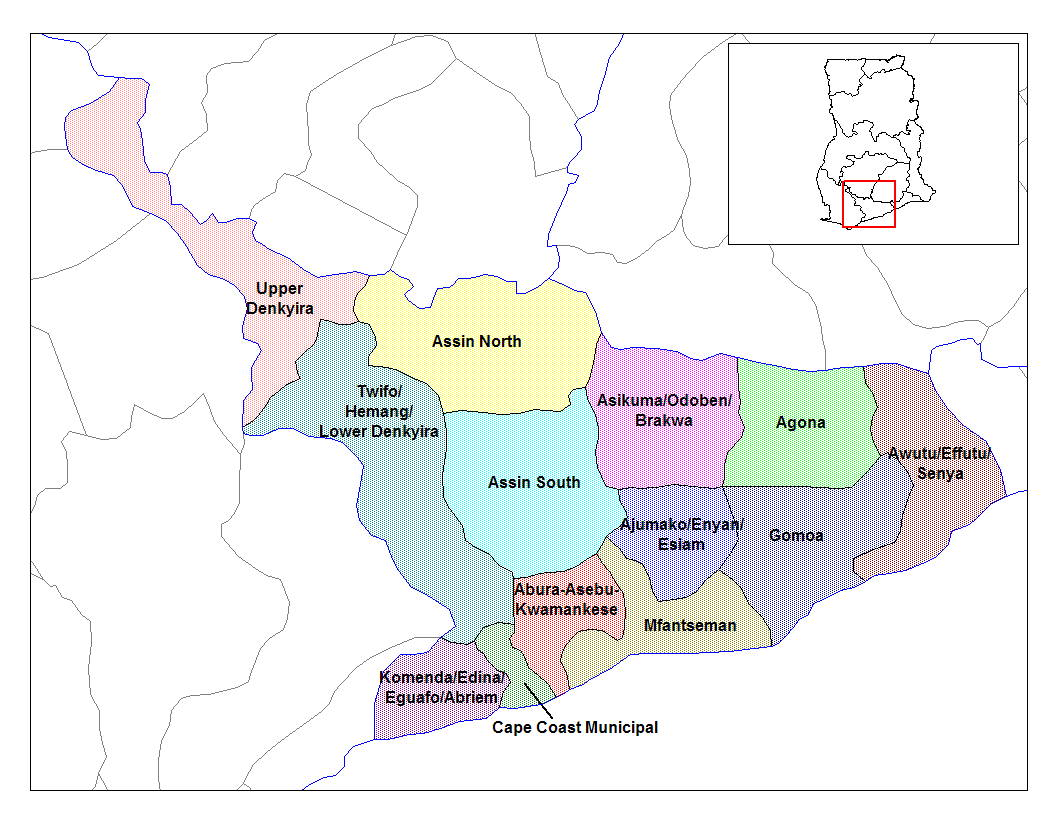
- Districts of Central Region

- Location of Upper Denkyira District within Central
- Coordinates: 5°58′0.12″N 1°46′59.88″W
- Country: Ghana
- Region: Central
- Capital: Dunkwa-On-Offin

Area
  - Total: 1,139 km^{2} (440 sq mi)

Population
  - Ethnicity: Akan people
- Time zone: UTC+0 (GMT)
- ISO 3166 code: GH-CP-UD

Upper Denkyira District is a former district that was located in Central Region, Ghana. Originally created as an ordinary district assembly in 1988, which was created from the former Denkyira District Council. However on 29 February 2008, it was split out into two new districts: Upper Denkyira East District (which it was elevated to municipal district assembly status on that same year; capital: Dunkwa-On-Offin) and Upper Denkyira West District (capital: Diaso). The district assembly was located in the northwest part of Central Region and had Dunkwa-On-Offin as its capital town.

== Background ==
It was named after the former kingdom of Denkyira. Its District Chief Executive was Richard Anane Adabor.
