= Bimbilla =

- District Capital
- Location in Ghana
- Coordinates: 8°51′26″N 0°03′24″W
- Country: Ghana
- Region: Northern Region
- District: Nanumba North District
- Elevation: 650 ft (198 m)

Bimbilla is the capital town of Nanumba North District, a district in the Northern Region of Ghana. It is located in the East of the region, and is near the Oti River. The location is situated within the range of 8.5° north to 9.25° north latitude, and between 0.57° east to 0.5° east longitude. It borders five municipalities: Yendi Municipal to the north, Mion Municipal to the northwest, East Gonja Municipal to the west and southwest, Nanumba South Municipal to the south and east, and Zabzugu Municipal to the north-northeast.

== History ==
Bimbilla was founded by Naa Ŋmantambo (son of Na Gbewa) in the mid-13th century as the capital of his newly established Nanung Kingdom. This was after moving south from his brother Sitobu, who founded the present-day Dagbon Kingdom. According to oral tradition, upon its founding, Bimbilla was named after the city in present-day Burkina Faso called Fada N'gourma. At its founding in the early 13th century, Fada N'gourma was called Bing (also spelt Bingo in French). Bimbilla was therefore named "Bing Billa," which literally translates as Small Bing in Dagbani. The choice of the name was influenced by the historic connection many followers of Naa Ŋmantambo have to Bing. Other major towns created along Bimbilla during the period include Nakpa, Bakpaba, Joanayili, Dokpam, Chamba, Gbingbalga, Darayili, and Wulensi Ghana. Salaga was a later addition, which was taken by the Gonja and turned into a commercial capital. Bimbilla was attacked and burnt down by the German colonial army on 29 November 1896 as a precursor to the great battle of Adibo against the Dagomba army. Today, Bimbillla is the capital of the Nanumba North Municipality.

== Population ==
The population of Bimbilla, along with all other rural settlements that form the Nanumba North Municipality, is 188,680 with 92,279 males and 96,401 females, according to the 2021 population and housing census by the Ghana Statistical Service (GSS).

== Education ==
Bimbilla has a Teachers' Training College, established by the Evangelical Presbyterian Church in 1962, called the E.P. College of Education, the only tertiary institution in the township. It also has one Senior High School (SHS) called Bimbilla Senior High School, which is a boarding school, and one Vocational training School which serves neighboring communities. At the lower-secondary level, the town can boast of several primary and Junior High Schools (JHS). Central Primary/JHS and Jilo Primary/JHS are the oldest schools. Naa Abdullah Day Nursery is the oldest kindergarten in Bimbilla.

== Health ==
The Bimbilla Hospital, also known as the Bimbilla Government Hospital, is a district hospital located in Bimbilla, the capital of the Nanumba North Municipality in the Northern Region of Ghana.

It is a secondary level hospital, and in 2022, it was recognized as the Best Performing Secondary Level Hospital in the Northern Region by the Ghana Health Service (GHS) Excellence Awards.

Also, it has other smaller health facilities within the township.

The Millennium Hospital Bimbilla - a level B2 health facility and Alaafee Medical Center also a level B2 health facility of which are all accredited to the National Health Insurance Authority (NHIA).

== Governance ==
Bimbilla serves as the headquarters of the Nanung Traditional Council, presided over by the paramount chief. The jurisdiction of the Nanung Traditional Area spans across the Nanumba North Municipality, Nanumba South Districts, and portions of the Nkwanta North District. The traditional council comprises ten paramount chiefs and thirty-two divisional chiefs.

== Transport ==
Bimbilla is connected by road to the towns of Salaga and Yendi. A road to Nkwanta is being funded $50 million by the European Union.

== Notable sons and daughters ==
- Mohamed Ibn Chambas, 1st President of the ECOWAS Commission
- Nantogma Atta, MP and deputy foreign minister under Ghana's first president, Kwame Nkrumah
- Mugeez (fullname: Rashid Abdul Mugeez), award-winning singer and songwriter
- Amosa Gbadamosi, former professional footballer
