= Upper Denkyira East (Ghana parliament constituency) =

Constituency in Ghana

- constituency for the Parliament of Ghana
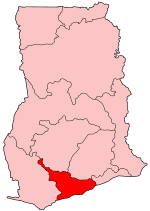
- District: Upper Denkyira District
- Region: Central Region of Ghana

Current constituency
- Party: National Democratic Congress
- MP: Emelia Ankomah

Upper Denkyira East is one of the constituencies represented in the Parliament of Ghana. It elects one member of parliament (MP) by the first past the post system of election. Emelia Ankomah is the member of parliament for the constituency. The Upper Denkyira East constituency is located in the Upper Denkyira district of the Central Region of Ghana.

== Boundaries ==
The seat is located entirely within the Upper Denkyira district of the Central Region of Ghana.

== History ==
The constituency was formerly the Upper Denkyira constituency. Prior to the Ghanaian parliamentary election in 2004, the Electoral Commission of Ghana created 29 new constituencies. One of these was Upper Denkyira West constituency which was carved out of the Upper Denkyira constituency leaving the now smaller Upper Denkyira East constituency.

== Members of Parliament ==
Upper Denkyira constituency
| Election | Member | Party |
| 1992 | Kwaku Addai-Gyambrah | National Democratic Congress |
| 1996 | Charles Omar Nyanor | New Patriotic Party |
| 2004 | Benjamin Kofi Ayeh | New Patriotic Party |
Upper Denkyira East constituency
| Election | Member | Party |
| 2004 | Benjamin Kofi Ayeh | New Patriotic Party |
| 2008 | Nana Amoako | New Patriotic Party |

== Elections ==
On 29 June 2004, Benjamin Kofi Ayeh of the New Patriotic Party (NPP) won from a field of three candidates with a majority of 20,899 to replace Charles Omar Nyanor also of the NPP. He went on to retain the seat in the 2004 parliamentary election after the boundaries were changed due to the carving out of the Upper Denkyira West constituency.

Nana Amoako, the current MP for the constituency was elected in the 2008 parliamentary election.

== See also ==
- List of Ghana Parliament constituencies
- Upper Denkyira District
