= Emelia Ankomah =

Ghanaian politician

Hon. Emelia Ankomah MP

Member of Parliament for Upper Denkyira East
- Incumbent
- Assumed office 7 January 2025
- Preceded by: Festus Awuah Kwofie

Personal details
- Party: National Democratic Congress

Emelia Ankomah is a Ghanaian politician who is a member of the National Democratic Congress (NDC). She is the member of parliament elect for the Upper Denkyira East parliament constituency.

== Politics ==
In May 2023, she stood for the National Democratic Congress primaries for Upper Denkyira East, winning the primaries unopposed.

In the 2024 General Elections, Ankomah contested the Upper Denkyira East constituency against Festus Awuah Kwofie, the candidate for the New Patriotic Party (NPP). She secured 24,426 votes (56.26%), narrowly defeating Festus Awuah Kwofie, who garnered 18,895 votes (43.52%).
