= Nanumba North Municipal District =

- Municipal District
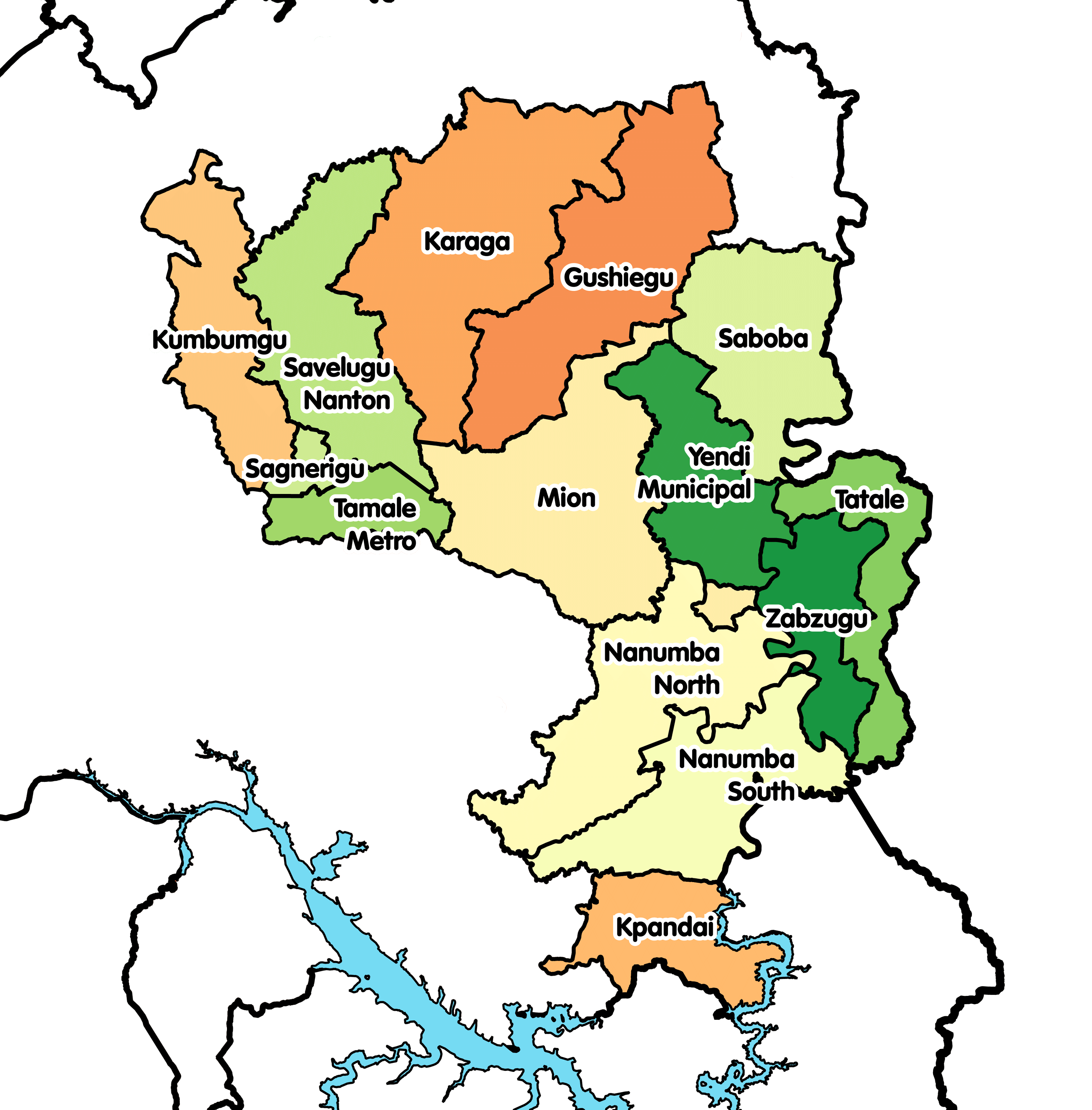
- Districts of Northern Region

- Location of Nanumba North Municipal District within Northern
- Coordinates: 8°51′N 0°4′W
- Country: Ghana
- Region: Northern
- Capital: Bimbilla

Government
  - Municipal Chief Executive: Abdullah Yaqob

Area
  - Total: 2,383 km^{2} (920 sq mi)

Population (2021)
  - Total: 188,680
  - Density: 79.18/km^{2} (205.1/sq mi)
- Time zone: UTC+0 (GMT)
- ISO 3166 code: GH-NP-NN

Nanumba North Municipal District is one of the sixteen districts in Northern Region, Ghana. Originally it was formerly part of the then-larger Nanumba District in 1988, until the southern part of the district was split off to create Nanumba South District on 27 August 2004; thus the remaining part has been renamed as Nanumba North District. However on 15 March 2018, it was later elevated to municipal district assembly status to become Nanumba North Municipal District. The municipality is located in the southern part of Northern Region and has Bimbilla as its capital town.

Unlike many urban centers with daily markets, Nanumba North operates on a traditional six-day rotating market system.

== Villages ==
- Afayili
- Bondando
- Bincharataga
- Chamba
- Sabunjida
- Nbondo
- Lifaldo
- Moanguase
- Gungumpa
- Sagon no1
- Sagon no2
- Nabagbndo
- Bonglobu
- Biyundo
- Nasungdo
- Nabagnado
- Nakpache

== See also ==
- "Districts of Ghana". Statoids.
