= Upper Denkyira West (Ghana parliament constituency) =

Constituency in Ghana

- constituency for the Parliament of Ghana
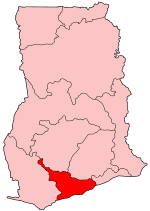
- District: Upper Denkyira District
- Region: Central Region of Ghana

Current constituency
- Created: 2004
- Party: New Patriotic Party
- MP: Rudolf Amoako-Gyampah

Upper Denkyira West is one of the constituencies represented in the Parliament of Ghana. It elects one member of parliament (MP) by the first past the post system of election. Rudolf Amoako-Gyampah is the member of parliament for the constituency. The Upper Denkyira West constituency is located in the Upper Denkyira district of the Central Region of Ghana.

== Boundaries ==
The seat is located entirely within the Upper Denkyira district of the Central Region of Ghana.

== History ==
The constituency was created when it was carved out of the Upper Denkyira constituency prior to the Ghanaian parliamentary election in 2004. This was when the Electoral Commission of Ghana created 29 new constituencies. What was left became the Upper Denkyira East constituency.

== Members of Parliament ==
Election	Member	Party
2004	Daniel Ohene Darko	National Democratic Congress

From 2016 to 2020 Samuel Nsowah Djan

== Elections ==
Daniel Ohene Darko, the current MP for the constituency was first elected in 2020.

== See also ==
- List of Ghana Parliament constituencies
- Upper Denkyira District
