= Diaso =

Coordinates: 6°09′N 2°09′W

- Town
- Interactive map of Diaso
- Country: Ghana
- Region: Central Region

Diaso is a town in the Central region of Ghana. The Diaso Senior High School is located in the town. The school is a second cycle institution.
