= Wulensi =

- District Capital
- Location of Wulensi in Northern region
- Coordinates: 8°39′N 0°01′W
- Country: Ghana
- Region: Northern Region
- District: Nanumba South District

Population (2013)
  - Total: —
- Time zone: GMT
  - Summer (DST): GMT

Wulensi is a town and is the capital of Nanumba South district, a district in the Northern Region of north Ghana.

- Gbungbaliga
- Boayili
- Banayi
- Agbodito 5. *Bassarekura* - hamlet near Agbodito 6. *Jimam* 7. *Jerba* 8. *Monyindo* - village near Jerba 9. *Takorodo* - hamlet near Jerba and Kpabudo 10. *Tampaya* 11. *Kanjo* - village near Tampaya 12. *Montanaya* 13. *Zonyohini* 14. *Salena* - hamlet near Zonyohini 15. *Salnayili Battor* 16. *Kotoya* 17. *Tinageria* - village near Kotoya 18. *Kpabudo* 19. *Tikayido* - village near Banayi 20. *Ubunja* 21. *Lemina* - hamlet near Ubunja 22. *Lancha* 23. *Chichagi* 24. *Puduya*
