= Nanumba South District =

- District
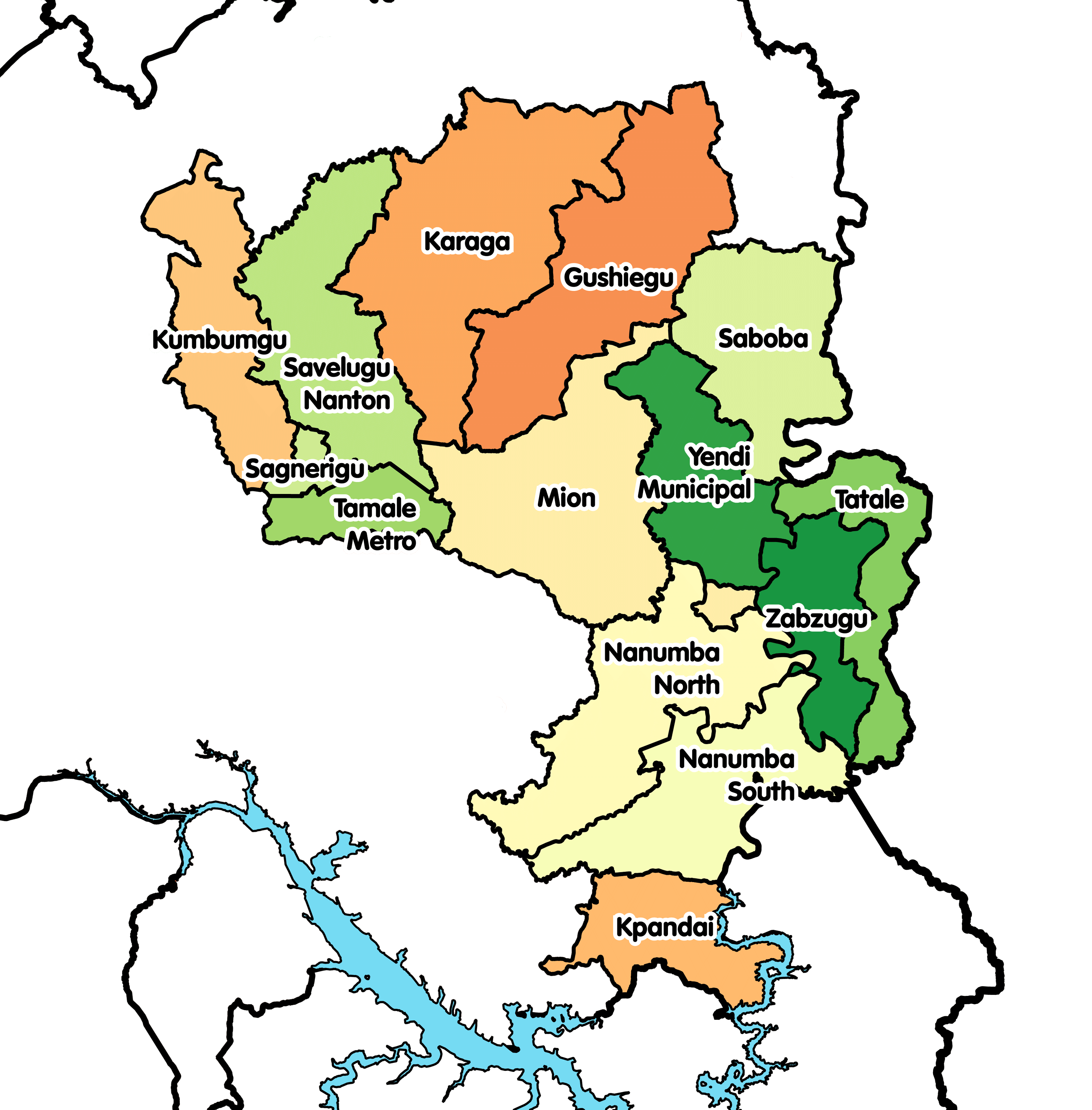
- Districts of Northern Region

- Location of Nanumba South District within Northern
- Coordinates: 8°39′N 0°1′W
- Country: Ghana
- Region: Northern
- Capital: Wulensi

Government
  - District Executive: Ibrahim Nantogmah Munkaila

Area
  - Total: 1,300 km^{2} (500 sq mi)

Population (2021)
  - Total: 106,374
- Time zone: UTC+0 (GMT)
- ISO 3166 code: GH-NP-NS

Nanumba South District is one of the sixteen districts in Northern Region, Ghana. Originally it was formerly part of the then-larger Nanumba District in 1988, until the southern part of the district was split to off to create Nanumba South District on 27 August 2004; thus the remaining part has been renamed as Nanumba North District (which it was later elevated to municipal district assembly status to become Nanumba North Municipal District on 15 March 2018). The district assembly is located in the eastern part of Eastern Region and has Wulensi as its capital town.

== Demographics ==
The district had a population of 106,374 as at the 2021 Ghana population Census.

== See also ==
- "Districts of Ghana". Statoids.
