= Dunkwa-on-Offin =

Dunkwa-on-Offin Dunkwa
- Town
- Location within Ghana
- Coordinates: 5°58′00″N 1°47′00″W
- Country: Ghana
- Region: Central Region
- District: Upper Denkyira East Municipal District
- Elevation: 117 m (384 ft)

Population (2013)
  - Total: 33,379
- Time zone: GMT
  - Summer (DST): GMT

Dunkwa-On-Offin or simply Dunkwa, is a town and the capital of the Upper Denkyira East Municipal District, a district in the Central Region of south Ghana. Dunkwa-On-Offin has a 2013 settlement population of 33,379 people.

== Geography ==
=== Topography ===
Dunkwa-On-Offin town is located along the Offin River. Dunkwa-On-Offin is low-lying with loose quaternary sands and the town rises up to 117 metres above sea level. The town is drained by a number of rivers and streams, including the Offin River and other small steams.

== Culture ==
The Dunkwah-On-Offin Lodge No. 89 is an Orange Lodge within the Orange Order. They are governed by the Grand Orange Lodge of Ghana. They focus on developing the town's youth, promoting Christianity and history of the Orange Order.

== See also ==
- Denkyira
- Gyimi River
